= 2021 Nürburgring Langstrecken-Serie =

Motorsport season

The 2021 Nürburgring Langstrecken-Serie was the 44th season of the German endurance series (formerly VLN) run at the Nürburgring Nordschleife, and second run as the Nürburgring Langstrecken-Serie (NLS). The season began on 27 March and ended on 9 October.

Philipp Leisen and Danny Brink won the drivers championship in a BMW 325i, driving for Adrenalin Motorsport.

== Calendar ==
| Rnd. | Race | Length | Circuit | Date |
|---|---|---|---|---|
| 1 | 66. ADAC Westfalenfahrt | 4 hours | (Germany) Nürburgring Nordschleife | 27 March |
| 2 | 45. DMV 4-Stunden-Rennen | 4 hours | (Germany) Nürburgring Nordschleife | 17 April |
| 3 | 62. ADAC ACAS Cup | 4 hours | (Germany) Nürburgring Nordschleife | 1 May |
| 4 | 52. Adenauer ADAC Rundstrecken-Trophy | 4 hours | (Germany) Nürburgring Nordschleife | 26 June |
| 5 | 61. ADAC Reinoldus-Langstreckenrennen | 4 hours | (Germany) Nürburgring Nordschleife | 10 July |
| 6 | 44. RCM DMV Grenzlandrennen | 4 hours | (Germany) Nürburgring Nordschleife | 11 July |
| 7 | ROWE 6 Stunden ADAC Ruhr-Pokal-Rennen | 6 hours | (Germany) Nürburgring Nordschleife | 11 September |
| 8 | 53. ADAC Barbarossapreis | 4 hours | (Germany) Nürburgring Nordschleife | 25 September |
| 9 | 45. DMV Münsterlandpokal | 4 hours | (Germany) Nürburgring Nordschleife | 9 October |

== Classes ==
Entries are split into multiple different classes. Current classes are:

| | Class |
NLS specials
| SP2T | Purpose-built racecars with a turbocharged-engine capacity between 1400 and 1749 cc and a turbocharger. |
| SP3 | Purpose-built racecars with an engine capacity between 1750 and 1999 cc. |
| SP3T | Purpose-built racecars with a turbocharged-engine capacity between 1750 and 1999 cc and a turbocharger. |
| SP4 | Purpose-built racecars with an engine capacity between 2000 and 2499 cc. |
| SP4T | Purpose-built racecars with a turbocharged-engine capacity between 2000 and 2599 cc and a turbocharger. |
| SP6 | Purpose-built racecars with an engine capacity between 3000 and 3499 cc. |
| SP7 | Purpose-built racecars with an engine capacity between 3500 and 3999 cc. |
| SP8 | Purpose-built racecars with an engine capacity over 4000 cc. |
| SP8T | Purpose-built racecars with a turbocharged-engine capacity between 2600 and 4000 cc. |
| SP9 | For FIA-homologated Group GT3 cars. GT3 sub-classes based on driver ranking system maintained by the FIA. |
| SP9 Pro, SP9 Pro-Am & SP9 Am | For FIA-homologated Group GT3 cars. GT3 sub-classes based on driver ranking system maintained by the FIA. |
| SP10 | For FIA and SRO-homologated Group GT4 cars. |
| SP-Pro | Prototype racecars with an engine capacity over 3000 cc. |
| SPX | 'Special vehicles' which do not fit into any other class. |
| AT(-G) | Vehicles using alternative fuel sources (e.g. electric, LPG, hydrogen, etc.) |
TCR touring cars
| TCR | FIA-homologated TCR Touring Cars. TCR sub-classes based on driver ranking system. |
| TCR Pro & TCR Am | FIA-homologated TCR Touring Cars. TCR sub-classes based on driver ranking system. |
NLS production cars
| V2 | Production cars with an engine capacity between 1600 and 1799 cc. |
| V4 | Production cars with an engine capacity between 2000 and 2499 cc. |
| V5 | Production cars with an engine capacity between 2500 and 2999 cc. |
| V6 | Production cars with an engine capacity over 3500 cc. |
| VT2 | Production cars with an engine capacity between 2000 and 2999 cc and a turbocharger. |
| VT3 | Production cars with an engine capacity over 3000cc and a turbocharger. |
Cup Class cars Cup classes are for single make identical or near identical specification cars
| Cup 2 | Porsche 911 GT3 Cup cars. |
| Cup 3 | Porsche Cayman GT4 Trophy cars. |
| Cup 5 | BMW M2 CS cars. |
| Cup X | KTM X-Bow Cup cars. |
| M240i | BMW M240i Racing Cup cars. |
| OPC | Opel Astra OPC cars. |
Gruppe H historic cars
| H2 | Pre-2008 production cars and purpose-built racecars with an engine capacity up to 1999 cc. |
| H4 | Pre-2008 production cars and purpose-built racecars with an engine capacity between 2000 and 6250 cc. |

== Entry Lists ==
=== SP9 ===
| Team | Car | No. | Drivers | Class | Rounds |
|---|---|---|---|---|---|
| (Germany) / Mercedes-AMG Team GetSpeed (Note: Car No. 2 entered as Mercedes-AMG Team GetSpeed, car No. 8 entered at round 1 as GetSpeed Performance and at round 3 as Mercedes-AMG Team GetSpeed and No. 9 and entered as GetSpeed Performance.); (Germany) / GetSpeed Performance | Mercedes-AMG GT3 Evo | 2 | (Germany) Maximilian Götz | P | 1, 3 |
| (Germany) / Mercedes-AMG Team GetSpeed; (Germany) / GetSpeed Performance | Mercedes-AMG GT3 Evo | 2 | (Spain) Daniel Juncadella | P | 1, 3 |
| (Germany) / Mercedes-AMG Team GetSpeed; (Germany) / GetSpeed Performance | Mercedes-AMG GT3 Evo | 2 | (Italy) Raffaele Marciello | P | 1, 3 |
| (Germany) / Mercedes-AMG Team GetSpeed; (Germany) / GetSpeed Performance | Mercedes-AMG GT3 Evo | 2 | (Germany) Fabian Schiller | P | 1 |
| (Germany) / Mercedes-AMG Team GetSpeed; (Germany) / GetSpeed Performance | Mercedes-AMG GT3 Evo | 2 | (Poland) Kuba Giermaziak | P | 4 |
| (Germany) / Mercedes-AMG Team GetSpeed; (Germany) / GetSpeed Performance | Mercedes-AMG GT3 Evo | 2 | (Germany) Frank Kechele | P | 4 |
| (Germany) / Mercedes-AMG Team GetSpeed; (Germany) / GetSpeed Performance | Mercedes-AMG GT3 Evo | 8 | (France) Emmanuel Collard | P | 1 |
| (Germany) / Mercedes-AMG Team GetSpeed; (Germany) / GetSpeed Performance | Mercedes-AMG GT3 Evo | 8 | (France) François Perrodo | P | 1 |
| (Germany) / Mercedes-AMG Team GetSpeed; (Germany) / GetSpeed Performance | Mercedes-AMG GT3 Evo | 8 | (France) Matthieu Vaxivière | P | 1 |
| (Germany) / Mercedes-AMG Team GetSpeed; (Germany) / GetSpeed Performance | Mercedes-AMG GT3 Evo | 8 | (France) Jules Gounon | P | 3 |
| (Germany) / Mercedes-AMG Team GetSpeed; (Germany) / GetSpeed Performance | Mercedes-AMG GT3 Evo | 8 | (Germany) Dirk Müller | P | 3 |
| (Germany) / Mercedes-AMG Team GetSpeed; (Germany) / GetSpeed Performance | Mercedes-AMG GT3 Evo | 8 | (Germany) Fabian Schiller | P | 3 |
| (Germany) / Mercedes-AMG Team GetSpeed; (Germany) / GetSpeed Performance | Mercedes-AMG GT3 Evo | 9 | (United States) Janine Shoffner | Am | 1–8 |
| (Germany) / Mercedes-AMG Team GetSpeed; (Germany) / GetSpeed Performance | Mercedes-AMG GT3 Evo | 9 | (Germany) Moritz Kranz | Am | 1–7 |
| (Germany) / Mercedes-AMG Team GetSpeed; (Germany) / GetSpeed Performance | Mercedes-AMG GT3 Evo | 9 | (United States) John Shoffner | Am | 1 |
| (Germany) Falken Motorsports | Porsche 911 GT3 R | 3 | (Germany) Sven Müller | P | 1 |
| (Germany) Falken Motorsports | Porsche 911 GT3 R | 3 | (Germany) Lance David Arnold | P | 1, 3 |
| (Germany) Falken Motorsports | Porsche 911 GT3 R | 3 | (Germany) Dirk Werner | P | 2–3 |
| (Germany) Falken Motorsports | Porsche 911 GT3 R | 3 | (Belgium) Alessio Picariello | P | 2, 6 |
| (Germany) Falken Motorsports | Porsche 911 GT3 R | 3 | (Norway) Dennis Olsen | P | 5–7, 9 |
| (Germany) Falken Motorsports | Porsche 911 GT3 R | 3 | (Germany) Tobias Müller | P | 5–7 |
| (Germany) Falken Motorsports | Porsche 911 GT3 R | 3 | (Germany) Lars Kern | P | 9 |
| (Germany) Falken Motorsports | Porsche 911 GT3 R | 4 | (Austria) Martin Ragginger | P | 1, 3, 5, 7, 9 |
| (Germany) Falken Motorsports | Porsche 911 GT3 R | 4 | (Austria) Klaus Bachler | P | 1, 3 |
| (Germany) Falken Motorsports | Porsche 911 GT3 R | 4 | (Germany) Sven Müller | P | 2, 9 |
| (Germany) Falken Motorsports | Porsche 911 GT3 R | 4 | (Austria) Thomas Preining | P | 2 |
| (Germany) Falken Motorsports | Porsche 911 GT3 R | 4 | (Belgium) Alessio Picariello | P | 5, 7 |
| (Germany) / Audi Sport Team Phoenix (Note: Car No. 5 and No. 11 entered as Phoenix Racing, car No. 15 and entered as Audi Sport Team Phoenix and car No. 22 entered as Wochenspiegel Team Monschau by Phoenix Racing.); (Germany) / Phoenix Racing; (Germany) / Wochenspiegel Team Monschau by Phoenix Racing | Audi R8 LMS Evo | 5 | (Germany) Vincent Kolb | P | All |
| (Germany) / Audi Sport Team Phoenix; (Germany) / Phoenix Racing; (Germany) / Wochenspiegel Team Monschau by Phoenix Racing | Audi R8 LMS Evo | 5 | (Germany) Frank Stippler | P | All |
| (Germany) / Audi Sport Team Phoenix; (Germany) / Phoenix Racing; (Germany) / Wochenspiegel Team Monschau by Phoenix Racing | Audi R8 LMS Evo | 5 | (Germany) Kim-Luis Schramm | P | 1 |
| (Germany) / Audi Sport Team Phoenix; (Germany) / Phoenix Racing; (Germany) / Wochenspiegel Team Monschau by Phoenix Racing | Audi R8 LMS Evo | 5 | (Italy) Michele Beretta | P | 3 |
| (Germany) / Audi Sport Team Phoenix; (Germany) / Phoenix Racing; (Germany) / Wochenspiegel Team Monschau by Phoenix Racing | Audi R8 LMS Evo | 5 | (South Africa) Kelvin van der Linde | P | 7 |
| (Germany) / Audi Sport Team Phoenix; (Germany) / Phoenix Racing; (Germany) / Wochenspiegel Team Monschau by Phoenix Racing | Audi R8 LMS Evo | 11 | (Italy) Michele Beretta | P | 2 |
| (Germany) / Audi Sport Team Phoenix; (Germany) / Phoenix Racing; (Germany) / Wochenspiegel Team Monschau by Phoenix Racing | Audi R8 LMS Evo | 11 | (Denmark) Nicki Thiim | P | 2 |
| (Germany) / Audi Sport Team Phoenix; (Germany) / Phoenix Racing; (Germany) / Wochenspiegel Team Monschau by Phoenix Racing | Audi R8 LMS Evo | 11 | (Germany) Kim-Luis Schramm | P | 9 |
| (Germany) / Audi Sport Team Phoenix; (Germany) / Phoenix Racing; (Germany) / Wochenspiegel Team Monschau by Phoenix Racing | Audi R8 LMS Evo | 11 | (Poland) Kuba Giermaziak | P | 9 |
| (Germany) / Audi Sport Team Phoenix; (Germany) / Phoenix Racing; (Germany) / Wochenspiegel Team Monschau by Phoenix Racing | Audi R8 LMS Evo | 15 | (Germany) Christer Jöns | P | 1 |
| (Germany) / Audi Sport Team Phoenix; (Germany) / Phoenix Racing; (Germany) / Wochenspiegel Team Monschau by Phoenix Racing | Audi R8 LMS Evo | 15 | (Germany) Dennis Marschall | P | 1 |
| (Germany) / Audi Sport Team Phoenix; (Germany) / Phoenix Racing; (Germany) / Wochenspiegel Team Monschau by Phoenix Racing | Audi R8 LMS Evo | 15 | (Germany) Frank Stippler | P | 3 |
| (Germany) / Audi Sport Team Phoenix; (Germany) / Phoenix Racing; (Germany) / Wochenspiegel Team Monschau by Phoenix Racing | Audi R8 LMS Evo | 15 | (Belgium) Dries Vanthoor | P | 3 |
| (Germany) / Audi Sport Team Phoenix; (Germany) / Phoenix Racing; (Germany) / Wochenspiegel Team Monschau by Phoenix Racing | Audi R8 LMS Evo | 15 | (Belgium) Frederic Vervisch | P | 3 |
| (Germany) / Audi Sport Team Phoenix; (Germany) / Phoenix Racing; (Germany) / Wochenspiegel Team Monschau by Phoenix Racing | Ferrari 488 GT3 | 22 | (Germany) Georg Weiss | P | 2–4, 6–7 |
| (Germany) / Audi Sport Team Phoenix; (Germany) / Phoenix Racing; (Germany) / Wochenspiegel Team Monschau by Phoenix Racing | Ferrari 488 GT3 | 22 | (Germany) Jochen Krumbach | P | 2–4, 6–7 |
| (Germany) / Audi Sport Team Phoenix; (Germany) / Phoenix Racing; (Germany) / Wochenspiegel Team Monschau by Phoenix Racing | Ferrari 488 GT3 | 22 | (Germany) Daniel Keilwitz | P | 2–3 |
| (Germany) / Audi Sport Team Phoenix; (Germany) / Phoenix Racing; (Germany) / Wochenspiegel Team Monschau by Phoenix Racing | Ferrari 488 GT3 | 22 | (Germany) Leonard Weiss | P | 3–4, 6–7 |
| (Germany) / Mercedes-AMG Team HRT (Note: Car No. 6 entered as Mercedes-AMG Team HRT and car No. 16 entered as Mercedes-AMG Team HRT Bilstein.); (Germany) / Mercedes-AMG Team HRT Bilstein | Mercedes-AMG GT3 Evo | 6 | (Germany) Hubert Haupt | P | 1, 5–8 |
| (Germany) / Mercedes-AMG Team HRT; (Germany) / Mercedes-AMG Team HRT Bilstein | Mercedes-AMG GT3 Evo | 6 | (Germany) Patrick Assenheimer | P | 1, 5–8 |
| (Germany) / Mercedes-AMG Team HRT; (Germany) / Mercedes-AMG Team HRT Bilstein | Mercedes-AMG GT3 Evo | 6 | (Germany) Nico Bastian | P | 1 |
| (Germany) / Mercedes-AMG Team HRT; (Germany) / Mercedes-AMG Team HRT Bilstein | Mercedes-AMG GT3 Evo | 6 | (Germany) Maro Engel | P | 1 |
| (Germany) / Mercedes-AMG Team HRT; (Germany) / Mercedes-AMG Team HRT Bilstein | Mercedes-AMG GT3 Evo | 6 | (United Kingdom) Adam Christodoulou | P | 5 |
| (Germany) / Mercedes-AMG Team HRT; (Germany) / Mercedes-AMG Team HRT Bilstein | Mercedes-AMG GT3 Evo | 6 | (Switzerland) Manuel Metzger | P | 6–8 |
| (Germany) / Mercedes-AMG Team HRT; (Germany) / Mercedes-AMG Team HRT Bilstein | Mercedes-AMG GT3 Evo | 16 | (United Kingdom) Adam Christodoulou | P | 1, 3 |
| (Germany) / Mercedes-AMG Team HRT; (Germany) / Mercedes-AMG Team HRT Bilstein | Mercedes-AMG GT3 Evo | 16 | (Germany) Luca Stolz | P | 1, 3 |
| (Germany) / Mercedes-AMG Team HRT; (Germany) / Mercedes-AMG Team HRT Bilstein | Mercedes-AMG GT3 Evo | 16 | (Switzerland) Manuel Metzger | P | 1 |
| (Germany) / Mercedes-AMG Team HRT; (Germany) / Mercedes-AMG Team HRT Bilstein | Mercedes-AMG GT3 Evo | 16 | (Germany) Maro Engel | P | 3 |
| (Germany) / Mercedes-AMG Team HRT; (Germany) / Mercedes-AMG Team HRT Bilstein | Mercedes-AMG GT3 Evo | 16 | (Germany) Hubert Haupt | P | 3 |
| (Austria) Konrad Motorsport | Lamborghini Huracán GT3 Evo | 7 | (Italy) Michele Di Martino | P | 1–2, 4–6 |
| (Austria) Konrad Motorsport | Lamborghini Huracán GT3 Evo | 7 | (Zimbabwe) Axcil Jefferies | P | 1–2, 4, 6–7, 9 |
| (Austria) Konrad Motorsport | Lamborghini Huracán GT3 Evo | 7 | (Switzerland) Alex Fontana | P | 1 |
| (Austria) Konrad Motorsport | Lamborghini Huracán GT3 Evo | 7 | (Poland) Kuba Giermaziak | P | 5–6 |
| (Austria) Konrad Motorsport | Lamborghini Huracán GT3 Evo | 7 | (Germany) Tim Zimmermann | P | 7 |
| (Austria) Konrad Motorsport | Lamborghini Huracán GT3 Evo | 7 | (South Africa) Jordan Pepper | P | 9 |
| (Italy) Dinamic Motorsport | Porsche 911 GT3 R | 12 | (Italy) Michele Beretta | P | 4 |
| (Italy) Dinamic Motorsport | Porsche 911 GT3 R | 12 | (Belgium) Adrien De Leener | P | 4 |
| (Italy) Dinamic Motorsport | Porsche 911 GT3 R | 38 | (Italy) Matteo Cairoli | P | 7, 9 |
| (Italy) Dinamic Motorsport | Porsche 911 GT3 R | 38 | (France) Romain Dumas | P | 7 |
| (Italy) Dinamic Motorsport | Porsche 911 GT3 R | 38 | (Italy) Michele Beretta | P | 9 |
| (Italy) Dinamic Motorsport | Porsche 911 GT3 R | 38 | (Belgium) Adrien De Leener | P | 9 |
| (Germany) RaceIng - Racing Engineers GmbH | Audi R8 LMS Evo | 14 | (Germany) Bernhard Henzel | PA | 4–6 |
| (Germany) RaceIng - Racing Engineers GmbH | Audi R8 LMS Evo | 14 | (Bulgaria) Pavel Lefterov | PA | 4–6 |
| (Hong Kong) KCMG | Porsche 911 GT3 R | 18 | (Italy) Edoardo Liberati | P | 1–2 |
| (Hong Kong) KCMG | Porsche 911 GT3 R | 18 | (Germany) Marco Holzer | P | 1–2 |
| (Hong Kong) KCMG | Porsche 911 GT3 R | 18 | (Switzerland) Alexandre Imperatori | P | 1 |
| (Hong Kong) KCMG | Porsche 911 GT3 R | 18 | (Australia) Josh Burdon | P | 1 |
| (Germany) Black Falcon Team IDENTICA | Porsche 911 GT3 R | 19 | (Germany) Noah Nagelsdiek | P | 8–9 |
| (Germany) Black Falcon Team IDENTICA | Porsche 911 GT3 R | 19 | (Germany) Hendrik Von Danwitz | P | 8–9 |
| (Germany) Black Falcon Team IDENTICA | Porsche 911 GT3 R | 19 | (Germany) Florian Naumann | P | 8 |
| (Germany) Black Falcon Team IDENTICA | Porsche 911 GT3 R | 19 | (Luxembourg) Carlos Rivas | P | 9 |
| (Germany) Schubert Motorsport | BMW M6 GT3 | 20 | (Netherlands) Stef Dusseldorp | P | 1, 3 |
| (Germany) Schubert Motorsport | BMW M6 GT3 | 20 | (Germany) Jens Klingmann | P | 1, 3 |
| (Germany) Schubert Motorsport | BMW M6 GT3 | 20 | (Finland) Jesse Krohn | P | 3 |
| (Germany) Schubert Motorsport | BMW M6 GT3 | 20 | (United Kingdom) Alexander Sims | P | 3 |
| (Germany) Aston Martin Racing | Aston Martin Vantage GT3 | 21 | (Denmark) Nicki Thiim | P | 8 |
| (Germany) Aston Martin Racing | Aston Martin Vantage GT3 | 21 | (Belgium) Maxime Martin | P | 8 |
| (Germany) / Audi Sport Team Car Collection (Note: Car No. 24 entered as Lionspeed by Car Collection Motorsport, cars No. 23 and No.32 entered as Audi Sport Team Car Collection and car No. 40 entered as Car Collection Motorsport); (Germany) / Lionspeed by Car Collection Motorsport; (Germany) / Car Collection Motorsport | Audi R8 LMS Evo | 23 | (Switzerland) Nico Müller | P | 3, 8 |
| (Germany) / Audi Sport Team Car Collection; (Germany) / Lionspeed by Car Collection Motorsport; (Germany) / Car Collection Motorsport | Audi R8 LMS Evo | 23 | (Germany) Christer Jöns | P | 3 |
| (Germany) / Audi Sport Team Car Collection; (Germany) / Lionspeed by Car Collection Motorsport; (Germany) / Car Collection Motorsport | Audi R8 LMS Evo | 23 | (South Africa) Kelvin van der Linde | P | 3 |
| (Germany) / Audi Sport Team Car Collection; (Germany) / Lionspeed by Car Collection Motorsport; (Germany) / Car Collection Motorsport | Audi R8 LMS Evo | 23 | (Germany) Patrick Kolb | P | 8 |
| (Germany) / Audi Sport Team Car Collection; (Germany) / Lionspeed by Car Collection Motorsport; (Germany) / Car Collection Motorsport | Audi R8 LMS Evo | 23 | (Switzerland) Patric Niederhauser | P | 8 |
| (Germany) / Audi Sport Team Car Collection; (Germany) / Lionspeed by Car Collection Motorsport; (Germany) / Car Collection Motorsport | Audi R8 LMS Evo | 24 | (Italy) Lorenzo Rocco di Torrepadula | PA | All |
| (Germany) / Audi Sport Team Car Collection; (Germany) / Lionspeed by Car Collection Motorsport; (Germany) / Car Collection Motorsport | Audi R8 LMS Evo | 24 | (Germany) Patrick Kolb | PA | All |
| (Germany) / Audi Sport Team Car Collection; (Germany) / Lionspeed by Car Collection Motorsport; (Germany) / Car Collection Motorsport | Audi R8 LMS Evo | 24 | (Switzerland) Patric Niederhauser | PA | 1–4, 9 |
| (Germany) / Audi Sport Team Car Collection; (Germany) / Lionspeed by Car Collection Motorsport; (Germany) / Car Collection Motorsport | Audi R8 LMS Evo | 24 | (Germany) Johannes Stengel | PA | 3 |
| (Germany) / Audi Sport Team Car Collection; (Germany) / Lionspeed by Car Collection Motorsport; (Germany) / Car Collection Motorsport | Audi R8 LMS Evo | 24 | (Netherlands) Milan Dontje | PA | 4–6, 8 |
| (Germany) / Audi Sport Team Car Collection; (Germany) / Lionspeed by Car Collection Motorsport; (Germany) / Car Collection Motorsport | Audi R8 LMS Evo | 24 | (Italy) Mattia Drudi | PA | 5–7 |
| (Germany) / Audi Sport Team Car Collection; (Germany) / Lionspeed by Car Collection Motorsport; (Germany) / Car Collection Motorsport | Audi R8 LMS Evo | 24 | (Germany) Jörg Viebahn | PA | 8–9 |
| (Germany) / Audi Sport Team Car Collection; (Germany) / Lionspeed by Car Collection Motorsport; (Germany) / Car Collection Motorsport | Audi R8 LMS Evo | 32 | (Germany) Markus Winkelhock | P | 1 |
| (Germany) / Audi Sport Team Car Collection; (Germany) / Lionspeed by Car Collection Motorsport; (Germany) / Car Collection Motorsport | Audi R8 LMS Evo | 32 | (Germany) Mike Rockenfeller | P | 1 |
| (Germany) / Audi Sport Team Car Collection; (Germany) / Lionspeed by Car Collection Motorsport; (Germany) / Car Collection Motorsport | Audi R8 LMS Evo | 32 | (Germany) Christopher Haase | P | 3 |
| (Germany) / Audi Sport Team Car Collection; (Germany) / Lionspeed by Car Collection Motorsport; (Germany) / Car Collection Motorsport | Audi R8 LMS Evo | 32 | (Germany) Dennis Marschall | P | 3 |
| (Germany) / Audi Sport Team Car Collection; (Germany) / Lionspeed by Car Collection Motorsport; (Germany) / Car Collection Motorsport | Audi R8 LMS Evo | 32 | (Switzerland) Patric Niederhauser | P | 3 |
| (Germany) / Audi Sport Team Car Collection; (Germany) / Lionspeed by Car Collection Motorsport; (Germany) / Car Collection Motorsport | Audi R8 LMS Evo | 40 | (Netherlands) Milan Dontje | PA | 3–7 |
| (Germany) / Audi Sport Team Car Collection; (Germany) / Lionspeed by Car Collection Motorsport; (Germany) / Car Collection Motorsport | Audi R8 LMS Evo | 40 | (Germany) Jörg Viebahn | PA | 3–7 |
| (Germany) / Audi Sport Team Car Collection; (Germany) / Lionspeed by Car Collection Motorsport; (Germany) / Car Collection Motorsport | Audi R8 LMS Evo | 40 | (Germany) Klaus Koch | PA | 3–4, 7 |
| (Germany) / Audi Sport Team Car Collection; (Germany) / Lionspeed by Car Collection Motorsport; (Germany) / Car Collection Motorsport | Audi R8 LMS Evo | 40 | (Germany) René Steurer | PA | 5 |
| (Germany) / Audi Sport Team Car Collection; (Germany) / Lionspeed by Car Collection Motorsport; (Germany) / Car Collection Motorsport | Audi R8 LMS Evo | 40 | (Germany) Peter Schmidt | PA | 7 |
| (Germany) Huber Motorsport | Porsche 911 GT3 R | 25 | (Germany) Nico Menzel | Am | 1 |
| (Germany) Huber Motorsport | Porsche 911 GT3 R | 25 | (Germany) Philipp Neuffer | Am | 1 |
| (Germany) Huber Motorsport | Porsche 911 GT3 R | 25 | (Germany) Nico Menzel | PA | 2–4, 8–9 |
| (Germany) Huber Motorsport | Porsche 911 GT3 R | 25 | (Germany) Stefan Aust | PA | 2–4 |
| (Germany) Huber Motorsport | Porsche 911 GT3 R | 25 | (Germany) Philipp Neuffer | PA | 2–3 |
| (Germany) Huber Motorsport | Porsche 911 GT3 R | 25 | (Switzerland) Alex Müller | PA | 3 |
| (Germany) Huber Motorsport | Porsche 911 GT3 R | 25 | (Germany) Johannes Stengel | PA | 4–6 |
| (Germany) Huber Motorsport | Porsche 911 GT3 R | 25 | (Germany) Joachim Thyssen | PA | 5–9 |
| (Germany) Huber Motorsport | Porsche 911 GT3 R | 25 | (Germany) Klaus Rader | PA | 5–7, 9 |
| (Germany) Huber Motorsport | Porsche 911 GT3 R | 25 | (Germany) Marco Seefried | PA | 5–6 |
| (Germany) Huber Motorsport | Porsche 911 GT3 R | 25 | (Germany) Alexander Mies | PA | 7 |
| (Switzerland) Octane126 | Ferrari 488 GT3 | 26 | (Germany) Björn Grossmann | P | 1–3 |
| (Switzerland) Octane126 | Ferrari 488 GT3 | 26 | (Switzerland) Jonathan Hirschi | P | 1–3 |
| (Switzerland) Octane126 | Ferrari 488 GT3 | 26 | (Germany) Luca Ludwig | P | 1–3 |
| (Switzerland) Octane126 | Ferrari 488 GT3 | 26 | (Switzerland) Simon Trummer | P | 1–2 |
| (Germany) HWA Team | Mercedes-AMG GT3 Evo | 27 | (Germany) Thomas Jäger | P | 8 |
| (Germany) HWA Team | Mercedes-AMG GT3 Evo | 27 | (Germany) Patrick Assenheimer | P | 8 |
| (Germany) HWA Team | Mercedes-AMG GT3 Evo | 27 | (Germany) Marcel Marchewicz | P | 8 |
| (Germany) Audi Sport Team Land | Audi R8 LMS Evo | 29 | (Germany) Christopher Mies | P | 3 |
| (Germany) Audi Sport Team Land | Audi R8 LMS Evo | 29 | (South Africa) Kelvin van der Linde | P | 3 |
| (Germany) Audi Sport Team Land | Audi R8 LMS Evo | 29 | (Italy) Mattia Drudi | P | 3 |
| (Germany) Frikadelli Racing Team | Porsche 911 GT3 R | 30 | (New Zealand) Earl Bamber | P | 1, 3 |
| (Germany) Frikadelli Racing Team | Porsche 911 GT3 R | 30 | (Australia) Matt Campbell | P | 1 |
| (Germany) Frikadelli Racing Team | Porsche 911 GT3 R | 30 | (United Kingdom) Nick Tandy | P | 2 |
| (Germany) Frikadelli Racing Team | Porsche 911 GT3 R | 30 | (Belgium) Maxime Martin | P | 2 |
| (Germany) Frikadelli Racing Team | Porsche 911 GT3 R | 30 | (France) Mathieu Jaminet | P | 3 |
| (Germany) Frikadelli Racing Team | Porsche 911 GT3 R | 30 | (Germany) Klaus Abbelen | PA | 4, 6–9 |
| (Germany) Frikadelli Racing Team | Porsche 911 GT3 R | 30 | (Germany) Tobias Müller | PA | 4, 9 |
| (Germany) Frikadelli Racing Team | Porsche 911 GT3 R | 30 | (Austria) Martin Ragginger | PA | 6 |
| (Germany) Frikadelli Racing Team | Porsche 911 GT3 R | 30 | (Germany) Felipe Fernandez Laser | PA | 7, 9 |
| (Germany) Frikadelli Racing Team | Porsche 911 GT3 R | 30 | (Zimbabwe) Axcil Jefferies | PA | 7 |
| (Germany) Frikadelli Racing Team | Porsche 911 GT3 R | 30 | (France) Julien Andlauer | PA | 8 |
| (Germany) Frikadelli Racing Team | Porsche 911 GT3 R | 31 | (Belgium) Maxime Martin | P | 1, 3 |
| (Germany) Frikadelli Racing Team | Porsche 911 GT3 R | 31 | (France) Patrick Pilet | P | 1, 3 |
| (Germany) Frikadelli Racing Team | Porsche 911 GT3 R | 31 | (France) Frédéric Makowiecki | P | 2 |
| (Germany) Frikadelli Racing Team | Porsche 911 GT3 R | 31 | (Norway) Dennis Olsen | P | 2 |
| (Germany) Rutronik Racing | Porsche 911 GT3 R | 33 | (Estonia) Tristan Viidas | P | 1–3 |
| (Germany) Rutronik Racing | Porsche 911 GT3 R | 33 | (Germany) Tobias Müller | P | 1–3 |
| (Germany) Rutronik Racing | Porsche 911 GT3 R | 33 | (France) Julien Andlauer | P | 1 |
| (Germany) Rutronik Racing | Porsche 911 GT3 R | 33 | (France) Romain Dumas | P | 3 |
| (Germany) Walkenhorst Motorsport | BMW M6 GT3 | 34 | (United Kingdom) David Pittard | P | 1, 3–8 |
| (Germany) Walkenhorst Motorsport | BMW M6 GT3 | 34 | (United Kingdom) Ben Tuck | P | 1, 3–8 |
| (Germany) Walkenhorst Motorsport | BMW M6 GT3 | 34 | (Norway) Christian Krognes | P | 3–8 |
| (Germany) Walkenhorst Motorsport | BMW M6 GT3 | 35 | (Germany) Jörg Müller | P | 1–8 |
| (Germany) Walkenhorst Motorsport | BMW M6 GT3 | 35 | (Germany) Mario von Bohlen und Halbach | P | 1–7 |
| (Germany) Walkenhorst Motorsport | BMW M6 GT3 | 35 | (Finland) Sami-Matti Trogen | P | 1–3 |
| (Germany) Walkenhorst Motorsport | BMW M6 GT3 | 35 | (France) Thomas Neubauer | P | 4–8 |
| (Germany) Walkenhorst Motorsport | BMW M6 GT3 | 35 | (Germany) Dennis Fetzer | P | 7–8 |
| (Germany) Walkenhorst Motorsport | BMW M6 GT3 | 36 | (Germany) Jörg Breuer | Am | 1–8 |
| (Germany) Walkenhorst Motorsport | BMW M6 GT3 | 36 | (Germany) Henry Walkenhorst | Am | 1–8 |
| (Germany) Walkenhorst Motorsport | BMW M6 GT3 | 36 | (Germany) Friedrich von Bohlen und Halbach | Am | 1–4, 8 |
| (Germany) Walkenhorst Motorsport | BMW M6 GT3 | 36 | (Finland) Sami-Matti Trogen | Am | 5–6 |
| (Germany) Walkenhorst Motorsport | BMW M6 GT3 | 36 | (Germany) Andreas Ziegler | Am | 7 |
| (Germany) Hella Pagid - racing one | Ferrari 488 GT3 | 39 | (Germany) Christian Kohlhaas | Am | 3, 5–6, 8 |
| (Germany) Hella Pagid - racing one | Ferrari 488 GT3 | 39 | (Germany) Mike Jäger | Am | 3, 5–6 |
| (Germany) Hella Pagid - racing one | Ferrari 488 GT3 | 39 | (Germany) Stephan Köhler | Am | 3 |
| (Germany) Hella Pagid - racing one | Ferrari 488 GT3 | 39 | (Germany) Carrie Schreiner | Am | 5–6 |
| (Germany) Hella Pagid - racing one | Ferrari 488 GT3 | 39 | (Netherlands) Jules Szymkowiak | Am | 8 |
| (Germany) Hella Pagid - racing one | Ferrari 488 GT3 | 39 | (Australia) Nick Foster | Am | 8 |
| (Germany) BMW Team RMG | BMW M6 GT3 | 44 | (United States) Neil Verhagen | P | All |
| (Germany) BMW Team RMG | BMW M6 GT3 | 44 | (United Kingdom) Daniel Harper | P | All |
| (Germany) BMW Team RMG | BMW M6 GT3 | 44 | (Germany) Max Hesse | P | All |
| (Germany) BMW Team RMG | BMW M6 GT3 | 44 | (Brazil) Augusto Farfus | P | 1–2 |
| (United States) CP Racing | Mercedes-AMG GT3 Evo | 45 | (United States) Charles Putman | PA | 2, 7 |
| (United States) CP Racing | Mercedes-AMG GT3 Evo | 45 | (United States) Joe Foster | PA | 2 |
| (United States) CP Racing | Mercedes-AMG GT3 Evo | 45 | (United Kingdom) Adam Christodoulou | PA | 2 |
| (United States) CP Racing | Mercedes-AMG GT3 Evo | 45 | (United States) Charles Espenlaub | PA | 3, 7 |
| (United States) CP Racing | Mercedes-AMG GT3 Evo | 45 | (United States) Shane Lewis | PA | 3, 7 |
| (United States) CP Racing | Mercedes-AMG GT3 Evo | 46 | (United States) Charles Putman | PA | 5–6 |
| (United States) CP Racing | Mercedes-AMG GT3 Evo | 46 | (United States) Charles Espenlaub | PA | 5–6 |
| (United States) CP Racing | Mercedes-AMG GT3 Evo | 46 | (United States) Joe Foster | PA | 5–6 |
| (United States) CP Racing | Mercedes-AMG GT3 Evo | 46 | (United States) Shane Lewis | PA | 5–6 |
| (Netherlands) Team Équipe-Vitesse | Audi R8 LMS Evo | 50 | (Germany) Michael Heimrich | Am | 1–4, 7–9 |
| (Netherlands) Team Équipe-Vitesse | Audi R8 LMS Evo | 50 | (Germany) Arno Klasen | Am | 1–4, 7–9 |
| (Netherlands) Team Équipe-Vitesse | Audi R8 LMS Evo | 50 | (Germany) Rudi Adams | Am | 1–4 |
| (Germany) Manthey Racing | Porsche 911 GT3 Cup | 51 | (Germany) Uwe Alzen | SPX | 8 |
| (Germany) Manthey Racing | Porsche 911 GT3 Cup | 51 | (Germany) Marco Holzer | SPX | 8 |
| (Germany) Manthey Racing | Porsche 911 GT3 R | 911 | (Germany) Lars Kern | P | 1–3 |
| (Germany) Manthey Racing | Porsche 911 GT3 R | 911 | (Denmark) Michael Christensen | P | 2–3, 7–8 |
| (Germany) Manthey Racing | Porsche 911 GT3 R | 911 | (France) Kévin Estre | P | 1–2, 7 |
| (Germany) Manthey Racing | Porsche 911 GT3 R | 911 | (Germany) Michael Ammermüller | P | 8 |
| | Porsche 911 GT3 Cup | 52 | (Turkey) Mustafa Mehmet Kaya | SPX | 9 |
| | Porsche 911 GT3 Cup | 52 | (Germany) Maik Rosenberg | SPX | 9 |
| | Porsche 911 GT3 Cup | 52 | (Germany) Mike Stursberg | SPX | 9 |
| (United States) Scuderia Cameron Glickenhaus | Scuderia Cameron Glickenhaus SCG 004c | 54 | (Germany) Thomas Mutsch | SPX | 3 |
| (United States) Scuderia Cameron Glickenhaus | Scuderia Cameron Glickenhaus SCG 004c | 54 | (Germany) Felipe Fernández Laser | SPX | 3 |
| (United States) Scuderia Cameron Glickenhaus | Scuderia Cameron Glickenhaus SCG 004c | 54 | (France) Franck Mailleux | SPX | 3 |
| (Germany) BMW Motorsport | BMW M4 GT3 | 55 | (Austria) Philipp Eng | SPX | 7–8 |
| (Germany) BMW Motorsport | BMW M4 GT3 | 55 | (Brazil) Augusto Farfus | SPX | 7–8 |
| (China) Hankook FFF Racing Team | Lamborghini Huracán GT3 Evo | 63 | (Italy) Marco Mapelli | P | 1, 3 |
| (China) Hankook FFF Racing Team | Lamborghini Huracán GT3 Evo | 63 | (Italy) Mirko Bortolotti | P | 1, 3 |
| (China) Hankook FFF Racing Team | Lamborghini Huracán GT3 Evo | 63 | (Italy) Andrea Caldarelli | P | 1 |
| (China) Hankook FFF Racing Team | Lamborghini Huracán GT3 Evo | 63 | (Italy) Giacomo Altoè | P | 1 |
| (China) Hankook FFF Racing Team | Lamborghini Huracán GT3 Evo | 63 | (France) Franck Perera | P | 3 |
| (Germany) MANN-FILTER Team Landgraf | Mercedes-AMG GT3 Evo | 70 | (Germany) Dirk Müller | P | 8–9 |
| (Germany) MANN-FILTER Team Landgraf | Mercedes-AMG GT3 Evo | 70 | (Germany) Luca-Sandro Trefz | P | 8–9 |
| (Germany) ROWE Racing | BMW M6 GT3 | 98 | (Germany) Marco Wittmann | P | 1, 3 |
| (Germany) ROWE Racing | BMW M6 GT3 | 98 | (United States) Connor De Phillippi | P | 1, 3 |
| (Germany) ROWE Racing | BMW M6 GT3 | 98 | (South Africa) Sheldon van der Linde | P | 1 |
| (Germany) ROWE Racing | BMW M6 GT3 | 98 | (Germany) Martin Tomczyk | P | 3 |
| (Germany) ROWE Racing | BMW M6 GT3 | 99 | (Netherlands) Nick Catsburg | P | 1, 3 |
| (Germany) ROWE Racing | BMW M6 GT3 | 99 | (United States) John Edwards | P | 1, 3 |
| (Germany) ROWE Racing | BMW M6 GT3 | 99 | (Austria) Philipp Eng | P | 1 |
| (Germany) ROWE Racing | BMW M6 GT3 | 99 | (United Kingdom) Nick Yelloly | P | 3 |
EntryLists:

| Icon | Class |
|---|---|
| P | Pro Cup |
| PA | Pro-Am Cup |
| Am | Am Cup |
| SPX | SPX |

=== SP7 ===
| Team | Car | No. | Drivers | Events |
|---|---|---|---|---|
| (Germany) Black Falcon Team TEXTAR | Porsche 991 GT3 Cup MR | 57 | (Netherlands) Paul Harkema | 1–3, 5 |
| (Germany) Black Falcon Team TEXTAR | Porsche 991 GT3 Cup MR | 57 | (Netherlands) Niels Langeveld | 1–3, 5 |
| (Germany) Black Falcon Team TEXTAR | Porsche 991 GT3 Cup MR | 57 | (Germany) Noah Nagelsdiek | 7 |
| (Germany) Black Falcon Team TEXTAR | Porsche 991 GT3 Cup MR | 57 | (Germany) Florian Naumann | 7 |
| (Germany) Black Falcon Team TEXTAR | Porsche 991 GT3 Cup MR | 57 | (Luxembourg) Carlos Rivas | 7 |
| (Germany) Black Falcon Team TEXTAR | Porsche 991 GT3 Cup MR | 57 | (Germany) Hendrik Von Danwitz | 7 |
| | Porsche 991 GT3 Cup | 58 | (United Kingdom) Bill Cameron | 7–9 |
| | Porsche 991 GT3 Cup | 58 | (Germany) Jim Cameron | 7–9 |
| (Germany) 9und11 Racing Team | Porsche 991 GT3 Cup MR | 60 | (Germany) Georg Goder | 5–9 |
| (Germany) 9und11 Racing Team | Porsche 991 GT3 Cup MR | 60 | (Germany) Martin Schlüter | 5–9 |
| (Germany) 9und11 Racing Team | Porsche 991 GT3 Cup MR | 60 | (Germany) Ralf Oehme | 6, 8–9 |
| | Porsche 991 GT3 Cup | 62 | (Germany) Peter Bonk | 4 |
| | Porsche 991 GT3 Cup | 62 | (United Kingdom) Bill Cameron | 4 |
| | Porsche 992 GT3 Cup | 66 | (Germany) Peter Bonk | 3–9 |
| | Porsche 992 GT3 Cup | 66 | (Netherlands) Marco Van Ramshorst | 3–9 |
| (Germany) clickversicherung.de Team | Porsche 991 GT3 Cup MR | 69 | (Germany) Robin Chrzanowski | 1–3, 5–9 |
| (Germany) clickversicherung.de Team | Porsche 991 GT3 Cup MR | 69 | (Germany) Kersten Jodexnis | 1–3, 5–9 |
| (Germany) clickversicherung.de Team | Porsche 991 GT3 Cup MR | 69 | (Germany) Edgar Salewsky | 3 |
| (Germany) clickversicherung.de Team | Porsche 991 GT3 Cup MR | 69 | (New Zealand) Peter Scharmach | 5, 7–9 |
| (Germany) clickversicherung.de Team | Porsche 991 GT3 Cup MR | 69 | (Germany) Maximilian Koch | 6 |
| (Germany) rent2drive-FAMILIA-racing | Porsche 991 GT3 Cup MR | 77 | (Germany) David Ackermann | 4 |
| (Germany) rent2drive-FAMILIA-racing | Porsche 991 GT3 Cup MR | 77 | (Russia) Dmitry Lukovnikov | 4 |
| (Germany) rent2drive-FAMILIA-racing | Porsche 991 GT3 Cup MR | 77 | (Hungary) Csaba Walter | 4 |
| (Germany) RPM Racing | Porsche 991 GT3 Cup | 78 | (United States) Tracy Krohn | 4–6, 8 |
| (Germany) RPM Racing | Porsche 991 GT3 Cup | 78 | (Sweden) Niclas Jönsson | 4–6, 8 |
| (Germany) RPM Racing | Porsche 991 GT3 Cup | 79 | (Czech Republic) Milan Kodidek | 3, 7–8 |
| (Germany) RPM Racing | Porsche 991 GT3 Cup | 79 | (Belgium) Kris Cools | 3, 7 |
| (Germany) RPM Racing | Porsche 991 GT3 Cup | 79 | (Luxembourg) Bob Wilwert | 3, 8 |
| (Germany) RPM Racing | Porsche 991 GT3 Cup | 79 | (Germany) Philip Hamprecht | 7 |
| (Germany) Huber Motorsport | Porsche 991 GT3 Cup | 80 | (Germany) Hans Wehrmann | 1–4, 7–9 |
| (Germany) Huber Motorsport | Porsche 991 GT3 Cup | 80 | (Germany) Joachim Thyssen | 1–4 |
| (Germany) Huber Motorsport | Porsche 991 GT3 Cup | 80 | (Germany) Klaus Rader | 1, 3–4 |
| (Germany) Huber Motorsport | Porsche 991 GT3 Cup | 80 | (Germany) 'Enzo' | 2 |
| (Germany) Huber Motorsport | Porsche 991 GT3 Cup | 80 | (Germany) Alexander Mies | 7–9 |
| (Germany) Huber Motorsport | Porsche 991 GT3 Cup | 80 | (Germany) Ulrich Berg | 7, 9 |
| (Germany) Huber Motorsport | Porsche 991 GT3 Cup | 90 | (United States) Jonathan Miller | 2 |
| (Germany) Huber Motorsport | Porsche 991 GT3 Cup | 90 | (United States) Ramana Lagemann | 2 |
| (Germany) Huber Motorsport | Porsche 991 GT3 Cup | 90 | (United States) Christopher Allen | 2 |
| (Germany) Huber Motorsport | Porsche 991 GT3 Cup | 90 | (Germany) Hans Wehrmann | 5–6 |
| (Germany) Huber Motorsport | Porsche 991 GT3 Cup | 90 | (Germany) Ulrich Berg | 5–6 |
| (Germany) Huber Motorsport | Porsche 991 GT3 Cup | 90 | (Germany) Alexander Mies | 5–6 |
| (Belgium) Pit Lane – AMC Sankt Vith | Porsche Cayman GT4 Clubsport MR | 100 | (Belgium) Kurt Dujardyn | 1–3, 7–8 |
| (Belgium) Pit Lane – AMC Sankt Vith | Porsche Cayman GT4 Clubsport MR | 100 | (Belgium) Olivier Muytjens | 1–3, 7–8 |
| (Belgium) Pit Lane – AMC Sankt Vith | Porsche Cayman GT4 Clubsport MR | 100 | (Switzerland) Jacques Castelein | 1–3, 8 |
EntryLists:

=== SP8 ===
| Team | Car | No. | Drivers | Events |
|---|---|---|---|---|
| (Germany) Giti Tire Motorsport By WS Racing | Audi R8 LMS GT4 Evo | 128 | (Germany) Carrie Schreiner | 1–2 |
| (Germany) Giti Tire Motorsport By WS Racing | Audi R8 LMS GT4 Evo | 128 | (France) Célia Martin | 1–2 |
| (Germany) AMR Performance Centre Nürburgring | Aston Martin V8 Vantage GT4 | 130 | (Germany) Walter Wilhelm Laschet | 1, 4 |
| (Germany) AMR Performance Centre Nürburgring | Aston Martin V8 Vantage GT4 | 130 | (Germany) Fabio Yannick Laschet | 1, 4 |
| (Germany) Novel Racing with Toyo tire by Ring Racing | Lexus RC-F | 135 | (Germany) Uwe Kleen | 3 |
| (Germany) Novel Racing with Toyo tire by Ring Racing | Lexus RC-F | 135 | (Germany) Klaus Völker | 3 |
| (Germany) Novel Racing with Toyo tire by Ring Racing | Lexus RC-F | 135 | (Germany) Michael Tischner | 5–6 |
| (Germany) Novel Racing with Toyo tire by Ring Racing | Lexus RC-F | 135 | (Germany) Heiko Tönges | 5–6 |
EntryLists:

=== SP8T ===
| Team | Car | No. | Drivers | Events |
|---|---|---|---|---|
| (Germany) Black Falcon Team TEXTAR | Mercedes-AMG GT4 | 140 | (Turkey) Mustafa Mehmet Kaya | 1–5, 7 |
| (Germany) Black Falcon Team TEXTAR | Mercedes-AMG GT4 | 140 | (Germany) Mike Stursberg | 1–5, 7 |
| (Germany) Black Falcon Team TEXTAR | Mercedes-AMG GT4 | 140 | (Italy) Gabriele Piana | 1–4, 7 |
| (Germany) Black Falcon Team TEXTAR | Mercedes-AMG GT4 | 140 | (Germany) Stephan Rösler | 5 |
| (Germany) Black Falcon Team TEXTAR | Mercedes-AMG GT4 | 140 | (Turkey) Ersin Yücesan | 5, 7 |
| (Germany) Black Falcon Team TEXTAR | Mercedes-AMG GT4 | 141 | (Turkey) Ersin Yücesan | 2–3, 6 |
| (Germany) Black Falcon Team TEXTAR | Mercedes-AMG GT4 | 141 | (Germany) Marco Müller | 2–3 |
| (Germany) Black Falcon Team TEXTAR | Mercedes-AMG GT4 | 141 | (Germany) Stephan Rösler | 2–3 |
| (Germany) Black Falcon Team TEXTAR | Mercedes-AMG GT4 | 141 | (Turkey) Mustafa Mehmet Kaya | 6 |
| (Germany) Black Falcon Team TEXTAR | Mercedes-AMG GT4 | 141 | (Germany) Mike Stursberg | 6 |
| (Germany) Walkenhorst Motorsport | BMW M240i Racing Cup | 149 | (United Kingdom) Matthew Greenwood | 5–6 |
| (Germany) Walkenhorst Motorsport | BMW M240i Racing Cup | 149 | (Denmark) Nicolai Kjærgaard | 5–6 |
| (Germany) Walkenhorst Motorsport | BMW M240i Racing Cup | 149 | (United Kingdom) William Tregurtha | 5 |
| (Germany) Schnitzelalm Racing | Mercedes-AMG GT4 | 150 | (Germany) Peter Posavac | 4–6, 8 |
| (Germany) Schnitzelalm Racing | Mercedes-AMG GT4 | 150 | (Germany) Reinhold Renger | 4–6, 8 |
| (Germany) Schnitzelalm Racing | Mercedes-AMG GT4 | 150 | (Germany) Luca-Sandro Trefz | 4 |
| (Germany) Schnitzelalm Racing | Mercedes-AMG GT4 | 150 | (Germany) Alexander Kolb | 5–6, 8 |
| (Germany) Yeeti Racing | BMW M4 GT4 | 159 | (Denmark) Christina Nielsen | 5–7 |
| (Germany) Yeeti Racing | BMW M4 GT4 | 159 | (Italy) Domenico Solombrino | 5–7 |
| (Germany) Yeeti Racing | BMW M4 GT4 | 159 | (France) Célia Martin | 5–6 |
| (Germany) Yeeti Racing | BMW M4 GT4 | 159 | (Germany) Phil Hill | 7 |
| (Germany) Adrenalin Motorsport Team Alzner Automotive | BMW M240i Racing Cup | 160 | (Germany) Andreas Winkler | 3 |
| (Germany) Adrenalin Motorsport Team Alzner Automotive | BMW M240i Racing Cup | 160 | (Germany) Marcel Fugel | 3 |
EntryLists:

=== SP10 ===
| Team | Car | No. | Drivers | Events |
|---|---|---|---|---|
| (Germany) Waldow Performance | Alpine A110 GT4 | 110 | (Luxembourg) Max Lamesch | 1–3, 5 |
| (Germany) Waldow Performance | Alpine A110 GT4 | 110 | (Germany) Andreas Patzelt | 1–3, 5 |
| (Germany) Waldow Performance | Alpine A110 GT4 | 110 | (Germany) Janis Waldow | 1–3, 5 |
| (Germany) Waldow Performance | Alpine A110 GT4 | 110 | (Luxembourg) Steve Jans | 2 |
| (Germany) Black Falcon Team TEXTAR | Porsche 718 Cayman GT4 Clubsport (982) | 161 | (Germany) 'Iceman' | 1–3 |
| (Germany) Black Falcon Team TEXTAR | Porsche 718 Cayman GT4 Clubsport (982) | 161 | (Germany) Tobias Wahl | 1–3 |
| (Germany) Black Falcon Team TEXTAR | Porsche 718 Cayman GT4 Clubsport (982) | 161 | (Germany) Carsten Palluth | 1–2 |
| (Germany) Black Falcon Team TEXTAR | Porsche 718 Cayman GT4 Clubsport (982) | 161 | (Russia) Alexander Akimenkov | 9 |
| (Germany) Black Falcon Team TEXTAR | Porsche 718 Cayman GT4 Clubsport (982) | 161 | (Germany) Martin Meenen | 9 |
| (Germany) Black Falcon Team TEXTAR | Porsche 718 Cayman GT4 Clubsport (982) | 161 | (Russia) Vasilii Selivanov | 9 |
| (Germany) Schnitzelalm Racing | Mercedes-AMG GT4 | 162 | (Germany) Fidel Leib | 1–3 |
| (Germany) Schnitzelalm Racing | Mercedes-AMG GT4 | 162 | (Germany) Marcel Marchewicz | 1–3 |
| (Germany) Schnitzelalm Racing | Mercedes-AMG GT4 | 162 | (Germany) Reinhold Renger | 1–2 |
| (Germany) Schnitzelalm Racing | Mercedes-AMG GT4 | 162 | (Germany) Marek Böckmann | 3 |
| (Germany) Schnitzelalm Racing | Mercedes-AMG GT4 | 165 | (Germany) Tim Neuser | 1–6, 8–9 |
| (Germany) Schnitzelalm Racing | Mercedes-AMG GT4 | 165 | (Germany) Marek Böckmann | 1–2, 4–9 |
| (Germany) Schnitzelalm Racing | Mercedes-AMG GT4 | 165 | (Germany) Roland Froese | 1–2 |
| (Germany) Schnitzelalm Racing | Mercedes-AMG GT4 | 165 | (Germany) Reinhold Renger | 3 |
| (Germany) Schnitzelalm Racing | Mercedes-AMG GT4 | 165 | (Germany) Alexander Kolb | 3 |
| (Germany) Schnitzelalm Racing | Mercedes-AMG GT4 | 165 | (Germany) Marcel Marchewicz | 4–9 |
| (Germany) Schnitzelalm Racing | Mercedes-AMG GT4 | 165 | (Germany) Reinhold Renger | 7, 9 |
| (Germany) Schnitzelalm Racing | Mercedes-AMG GT4 | 165 | (Germany) Alex Lambertz | 7 |
| (Germany) Novel Racing with Toyo tire by Ring Racing | Toyota GR Supra GT4 | 171 | (Germany) Andreas Gülden | 1–3 |
| (Germany) Novel Racing with Toyo tire by Ring Racing | Toyota GR Supra GT4 | 171 | (Germany) Michael Tischner | 1–3 |
| (Germany) Schmickler Performance powered by Ravenol | Porsche 718 Cayman GT4 Clubsport (982) | 175 | (Italy) Roberto Pampanini | 3 |
| (Germany) Schmickler Performance powered by Ravenol | Porsche 718 Cayman GT4 Clubsport (982) | 175 | (Switzerland) Mauro Calamia | 3 |
| (Germany) Schmickler Performance powered by Ravenol | Porsche 718 Cayman GT4 Clubsport (982) | 175 | (Switzerland) Ivan Jacoma | 3 |
| (Germany) PROsport Racing | Aston Martin Vantage AMR GT4 | 176 | (Belgium) Guido Dumarey | 1–7, 9 |
| (Germany) PROsport Racing | Aston Martin Vantage AMR GT4 | 176 | (Switzerland) Alexander Walker | 1–3, 7, 9 |
| (Germany) PROsport Racing | Aston Martin Vantage AMR GT4 | 176 | (Belgium) Maxime Dumarey | 4–6 |
| (Germany) PROsport Racing | Aston Martin Vantage AMR GT4 | 176 | (Belgium) Jean Glorieux | 5 |
| (Germany) PROsport Racing | Aston Martin Vantage AMR GT4 | 176 | (Belgium) Nico Verdonck | 6 |
| (Germany) PROsport Racing | Aston Martin Vantage AMR GT4 | 176 | (Germany) Michael Hess | 7 |
| (Germany) PROsport Racing | Aston Martin Vantage AMR GT4 | 177 | (Belgium) Maxime Dumarey | 7, 9 |
| (Germany) PROsport Racing | Aston Martin Vantage AMR GT4 | 177 | (Belgium) Jean Glorieux | 7, 9 |
| (Germany) PROsport Racing | Aston Martin Vantage AMR GT4 | 177 | (Belgium) Nico Verdonck | 7 |
| (Germany) PROsport Racing | Aston Martin Vantage AMR GT4 | 177 | (Belgium) Guillaume Dumarey | 9 |
| (Germany) Allied Racing | Porsche 718 Cayman GT4 Clubsport (982) | 178 | (Germany) Dennis Fetzer | 3 |
| (Germany) Allied Racing | Porsche 718 Cayman GT4 Clubsport (982) | 178 | (Denmark) Nicolaj Møller Madsen | 3 |
| (Germany) Team AVIA Sorg Rennsport | BMW M4 GT4 | 179 | (United Kingdom) Teofilo Masera | 7 |
| (Germany) Team AVIA Sorg Rennsport | BMW M4 GT4 | 179 | (Germany) Sebastian von Gartzen | 7 |
| (Germany) Team AVIA Sorg Rennsport | BMW M4 GT4 | 180 | (United Kingdom) Brett Lidsey | 2–4 |
| (Germany) Team AVIA Sorg Rennsport | BMW M4 GT4 | 180 | (Italy) Ivan Berets | 2–4 |
| (Germany) Team AVIA Sorg Rennsport | BMW M4 GT4 | 180 | (Germany) Björn Simon | 5–6 |
| (Germany) Team AVIA Sorg Rennsport | BMW M4 GT4 | 180 | (Germany) Stephan Epp | 5–6 |
| (Germany) Team AVIA Sorg Rennsport | BMW M4 GT4 | 180 | (Germany) Philip Schauerte | 5 |
| (Germany) Team AVIA Sorg Rennsport | BMW M4 GT4 | 180 | (Germany) Heiko Eichenberg | 6, 8–9 |
| (Germany) Team AVIA Sorg Rennsport | BMW M4 GT4 | 180 | (United States) James Clay | 7 |
| (Germany) Team AVIA Sorg Rennsport | BMW M4 GT4 | 180 | (United States) Charlie Postins | 7 |
| (Germany) Team AVIA Sorg Rennsport | BMW M4 GT4 | 180 | (Germany) Stefan Beyer | 8 |
| (Germany) Team AVIA Sorg Rennsport | BMW M4 GT4 | 180 | (Germany) Torsten Kratz | 8 |
| (Germany) Team AVIA Sorg Rennsport | BMW M4 GT4 | 180 | (Denmark) Nicolaj Møller Madsen | 9 |
| (Germany) Walkenhorst Motorsport | BMW M4 GT4 | 181 | (United States) Chandler Hull | 2, 4–9 |
| (Germany) Walkenhorst Motorsport | BMW M4 GT4 | 181 | (United States) Jonathan Miller | 2, 4–9 |
| (Switzerland) Hofor Racing by Bonk Motorsport | BMW M4 GT4 | 191 | (Austria) Michael Fischer | 3–4 |
| (Switzerland) Hofor Racing by Bonk Motorsport | BMW M4 GT4 | 191 | (Italy) Gabriele Piana | 3–4 |
| (Switzerland) Hofor Racing by Bonk Motorsport | BMW M4 GT4 | 191 | (Germany) Michael Schrey | 3–4 |
EntryLists:

=== TCR ===
| Team | Car | No. | Drivers | Class | Rounds |
|---|---|---|---|---|---|
| (Germany) MSC Sinzig | Audi RS3 LMS TCR | 801 | (Denmark) 'Peter Hansen' | Am | 5–6 |
| (Germany) MSC Sinzig | Audi RS3 LMS TCR | 801 | (Denmark) Lars-Erik Nielsen | Am | 5–6 |
| | Audi RS3 LMS TCR | 802 | (Denmark) 'Peter Hansen' | Am | 1–3 |
| | Audi RS3 LMS TCR | 802 | (Denmark) Lars-Erik Nielsen | Am | 1–3 |
| (Germany) mathilda racing | CUPRA León TCR | 804 | (Germany) Jürgen Nett | P | 7 |
| (Germany) mathilda racing | CUPRA León TCR | 804 | (Germany) Joachim Nett | P | 7 |
| (Germany) mathilda racing | CUPRA León TCR | 804 | (Germany) Heiko Hammel | P | 7 |
| (Germany) mathilda racing | CUPRA León TCR | 804 | (Germany) Michael Paatz | P | 7 |
| (Germany) mathilda racing | CUPRA León TCR | 806 | (Germany) Michael Paatz | Am | 1–3 |
| (Germany) mathilda racing | CUPRA León TCR | 806 | (Germany) Timo Hochwind | Am | 1 |
| (Germany) mathilda racing | CUPRA León TCR | 806 | (Germany) Jürgen Nett | Am | 2 |
| (Germany) mathilda racing | CUPRA León TCR | 806 | (Germany) Kai Jordan | Am | 2 |
| (Germany) mathilda racing | CUPRA León TCR | 806 | (Spain) Mikel Azcona | Am | 3 |
| | CUPRA León TCR | 808 | (Germany) Jens Wulf | Am | 1–4, 7–9 |
| | CUPRA León TCR | 808 | (Germany) Alexander Schmidt | Am | 1–4, 8–9 |
| | CUPRA León TCR | 808 | (Germany) Thomas Mennecke | Am | 1–3 |
| | CUPRA León TCR | 808 | (Germany) Volker Garrn | Am | 1 |
| | CUPRA León TCR | 808 | (Germany) Meik Utsch | Am | 4, 8–9 |
| | CUPRA León TCR | 808 | (Germany) Andreas Tasche | Am | 7 |
| | CUPRA León TCR | 808 | (Germany) Lucas Waltermann | Am | 7 |
| (Germany) Bonk Motorsport | CUPRA León Competición TCR | 810 | (Germany) Hermann Bock | Am | 1–5, 7–9 |
| (Germany) Bonk Motorsport | CUPRA León Competición TCR | 810 | (Germany) Max Partl | Am | 1–4, 7 |
| (Germany) Bonk Motorsport | CUPRA León Competición TCR | 810 | (Germany) Jürgen Nett | Am | 5 |
| (Germany) Bonk Motorsport | CUPRA León Competición TCR | 810 | (Switzerland) Alexander Prinz | Am | 7–9 |
| (Germany) Lubner Motorsport | Opel Astra TCR | 822 | (Switzerland) Roger Vögeli | Am | 3, 5 |
| (Germany) Lubner Motorsport | Opel Astra TCR | 822 | (Switzerland) Roland Schmid | Am | 3, 5 |
| (South Korea) Hyundai Motorsport N | Hyundai Elantra N TCR | 831 | (Germany) Marc Basseng | P | 3 |
| (South Korea) Hyundai Motorsport N | Hyundai Elantra N TCR | 831 | (Germany) Manuel Lauck | P | 3 |
EntryLists:

| Icon | Class |
|---|---|
| P | Pro Cup |
| Am | Am Cup |

=== Other classes ===
| Team | Car | No. | Drivers | Events |
CUP2
| (Germany) 9und11 Racing Team | Porsche 991 GT3 Cup | 120 | (Germany) Ralf Oehme | 1–5 |
| (Germany) 9und11 Racing Team | Porsche 991 GT3 Cup | 120 | (Germany) Georg Goder | 1–4 |
| (Germany) 9und11 Racing Team | Porsche 991 GT3 Cup | 120 | (Germany) Martin Schlüter | 1–4 |
| (Germany) 9und11 Racing Team | Porsche 991 GT3 Cup | 120 | (Germany) Niklas Oehme | 5 |
| (Germany) 9und11 Racing Team | Porsche 991 GT3 Cup | 120 | (Germany) Leonard Oehme | 5 |
SP6
| (Germany) Manheller Racing | BMW M3 E46 | 198 | (Germany) Stefan Manheller | 6 |
| (Germany) Manheller Racing | BMW M3 E46 | 198 | (Germany) Uwe Krumscheid | 6 |
| (Germany) Manheller Racing | BMW M3 E46 | 198 | (Germany) Frank Weishar | 6 |
| (Germany) Schmickler Performance powered by Ravenol | Porsche 911 | 202 | (Germany) Albert Egbert | 5, 7 |
| (Germany) Schmickler Performance powered by Ravenol | Porsche 911 | 202 | (Germany) Sascha Kloft | 5, 7 |
| (Switzerland) Hofor Racing | BMW M3 GTR | 210 | (Switzerland) Martin Kroll | 7 |
| (Switzerland) Hofor Racing | BMW M3 GTR | 210 | (Switzerland) Michael Kroll | 7 |
| (Switzerland) Hofor Racing | BMW M3 GTR | 210 | (Switzerland) Chantal Prinz | 7 |
| (Switzerland) Hofor Racing | BMW M3 GTR | 210 | (Switzerland) Alexander Prinz | 7 |
| (Switzerland) Hofor Racing | BMW M3 CSL | 211 | (Switzerland) Martin Kroll | 3, 5–6, 8 |
| (Switzerland) Hofor Racing | BMW M3 CSL | 211 | (Switzerland) Michael Kroll | 3, 5–6, 8 |
| (Switzerland) Hofor Racing | BMW M3 CSL | 211 | (Switzerland) Alexander Prinz | 3, 5–6, 8 |
| (Switzerland) Hofor Racing | BMW M3 CSL | 211 | (Switzerland) Chantal Prinz | 3, 5, 8 |
| (Germany) RPM Racing | Porsche 991 GT3 Cup | 215 | (Germany) Mathias Hüttenrauch | 4–6 |
| (Germany) RPM Racing | Porsche 991 GT3 Cup | 215 | (Germany) Michael Czyborra | 4–6 |
| (Germany) RPM Racing | Porsche 991 GT3 Cup | 215 | (Netherlands) Patrick Huisman | 4–6 |
SP5
| | Subaru BRZ Cup | 232 | (Germany) Lucian Gavris | 1–7 |
| | Subaru BRZ Cup | 232 | (Germany) Tim Schrick | 1–7 |
SP4
| | BMW 325i | 244 | (Germany) Axel Wiegner | 4, 6 |
| | BMW 325i | 244 | (Germany) Jonas Spölgen | 4, 6 |
| | BMW 325i | 247 | (Germany) Carsten Meurer | 2–3 |
| | BMW 325i | 247 | (Germany) Volker Schackmann | 2–3 |
| | BMW 325i | 250 | (Germany) Reiner Thomas | 2–3, 5–8 |
| | BMW 325i | 250 | (Germany) Manfred Schmitz | 2–3, 5–8 |
| | BMW 325i | 251 | (Germany) Manuel Dormagen | 1 |
| | BMW 325i | 251 | (Germany) Sven Oepen | 1 |
| | BMW 325i | 252 | (Germany) Jörg Schönfelder | 2, 7–9 |
| | BMW 325i | 252 | (Germany) Christian Schotte | 2, 7–9 |
| | BMW 325i | 252 | (Germany) Serge Van Vooren | 2, 7, 9 |
| | BMW 325i | 252 | (Germany) Katharina Lippka | 2 |
| | BMW 325i | 252 | (Germany) Jens Esser | 7–8 |
| (Germany) SFG Schönau e.V. im ADAC | BMW 325i | 253 | (Germany) Dominik Schöning | 4 |
| (Germany) SFG Schönau e.V. im ADAC | BMW 325i | 253 | (Germany) Roman Schiemenz | 4 |
| | BMW E46 | 254 | (Germany) Thorsten Köppert | 3, 7 |
| | BMW E46 | 254 | (Germany) Ingo Oepen | 3 |
| | BMW E46 | 254 | (Germany) Uwe Diekert | 7 |
| | BMW E46 | 254 | (Germany) Stefan Trost | 7 |
| | BMW 325i | 255 | (Germany) Marc Riebel | 7 |
| | BMW 325i | 255 | (Italy) Florian Haller | 7 |
| | BMW 325i | 255 | (Italy) Daniel Fink | 7 |
| | BMW 325i | 255 | (Germany) Daniel Jolk | 7 |
SP4T
| | Porsche 718 Cayman GT4 Clubsport | 263 | (Germany) Fabian Peitzmeier | All |
| | Porsche 718 Cayman GT4 Clubsport | 263 | (Germany) Jürgen Bretschneider | 1–4, 7, 9 |
| | Porsche 718 Cayman GT4 Clubsport | 263 | (Germany) Ralf Zensen | 1, 9 |
| | Porsche 718 Cayman GT4 Clubsport | 263 | (Germany) Roman Schiemenz | 1 |
| | Porsche 718 Cayman GT4 Clubsport | 263 | (Germany) Michael Küke | 2–3, 5–7, 9 |
| | Porsche 718 Cayman GT4 Clubsport | 263 | (Germany) Christian Dannesberger | 8 |
SP3
| | Toyota GT86 Cup | 269 | (Germany) Anton Bauer | 1, 3–4 |
| | Toyota GT86 Cup | 269 | (Germany) Sebastian Giesel | 1, 3–4 |
| (Belgium) Pit Lane – AMC Sankt Vith | Toyota GT86 Cup | 270 | (Belgium) 'Brody' | 1–8 |
| (Belgium) Pit Lane – AMC Sankt Vith | Toyota GT86 Cup | 270 | (Italy) Bruno Barbaro | 1–8 |
| (Belgium) Pit Lane – AMC Sankt Vith | Toyota GT86 Cup | 270 | (Belgium) Jacques Derenne | 1–8 |
| (Belgium) Pit Lane – AMC Sankt Vith | Toyota GT86 Cup | 270 | (Belgium) Nicolas Baert | 1–3 |
| (Belgium) Pit Lane – AMC Sankt Vith | Toyota GT86 Cup | 270 | (Belgium) Olivier Muytjens | 4–6 |
| (Germany) Automobilclub von Deutschland | Opel Manta (Flying Fox) GT | 271 | (Germany) Olaf Beckmann | 2, 5–6, 9 |
| (Germany) Automobilclub von Deutschland | Opel Manta (Flying Fox) GT | 271 | (Germany) Peter Hass | 2, 5–6, 9 |
| (Germany) Automobilclub von Deutschland | Opel Manta (Flying Fox) GT | 271 | (Germany) Volker Strycek | 2, 5–6, 9 |
| | Toyota GT86 Cup | 273 | (Germany) Ulli Packeisen | 7, 9 |
| | Toyota GT86 Cup | 273 | (Germany) Robert Keil | 7 |
| | Toyota GT86 Cup | 273 | (Germany) Benjamin Zerfeld | 7 |
| | Toyota GT86 Cup | 273 | (Netherlands) Duncan Huisman | 9 |
| (Germany) Ollis Garage | Dacia Logan | 280 | (Germany) Oliver Kriese | 1–3, 5–7, 9 |
| (Germany) Ollis Garage | Dacia Logan | 280 | (Germany) 'DOOM' | 1–3, 5, 7, 9 |
| (Germany) Ollis Garage | Dacia Logan | 280 | (Germany) Harry Ohs | 1–3 |
| (Germany) Ollis Garage | Dacia Logan | 280 | (Germany) Michael Lachmayer | 6, 9 |
| (Germany) Ollis Garage | Dacia Logan | 280 | (Germany) Yannik Lachmayer | 6, 9 |
| (Switzerland) Autorama AG | Toyota GT86 Cup | 281 | (Switzerland) Dario Stanco | 5, 7 |
| (Switzerland) Autorama AG | Toyota GT86 Cup | 281 | (Switzerland) Armando Stanco | 5, 7 |
| | Renault Clio Cup | 283 | (Germany) Harald Leppert | 7–9 |
| | Renault Clio Cup | 283 | (Germany) Ronny Leppert | 7–9 |
| | Renault Clio | 284 | (Germany) Dominic Senn | 4 |
| | Renault Clio | 284 | (Germany) Remo Jola | 4 |
| (Hungary) Car Competition Kft. | Toyota GT86 Cup | 286 | (Hungary) Adam Lengyel | 7, 9 |
| (Hungary) Car Competition Kft. | Toyota GT86 Cup | 286 | (Hungary) Bendeguz Molnar | 7, 9 |
SP3T
| (Germany) Max Kruse Racing | Volkswagen Golf GTI TCR | 10 | (Germany) Andreas Gülden | 1–8 |
| (Germany) Max Kruse Racing | Volkswagen Golf GTI TCR | 10 | (Germany) Matthias Wasel | 1–8 |
| (Germany) Max Kruse Racing | Volkswagen Golf GTI TCR | 10 | (Germany) Benjamin Leuchter | 1–3 |
| (Germany) Max Kruse Racing | Volkswagen Golf GTI TCR | 10 | (Switzerland) Frédéric Yerly | 4–8 |
| (Germany) Max Kruse Racing | Volkswagen Golf GTI TCR | 310 | (Germany) Marek Schaller | 5–8 |
| (Germany) Max Kruse Racing | Volkswagen Golf GTI TCR | 310 | (Germany) Marius Rauer | 5–8 |
| (Germany) Max Kruse Racing | Volkswagen Golf GTI TCR | 310 | (Denmark) 'Peter Hansen' | 9 |
| (Germany) Max Kruse Racing | Volkswagen Golf GTI TCR | 310 | (Denmark) Lars-Erik Nielsen | 9 |
| (Germany) Max Kruse Racing | Volkswagen Golf GTI TCR | 333 | (Netherlands) Tom Coronel | 1–3 |
| (Germany) Max Kruse Racing | Volkswagen Golf GTI TCR | 333 | (Switzerland) Frédéric Yerly | 1–3, 9 |
| (Germany) Max Kruse Racing | Volkswagen Golf GTI TCR | 333 | (Switzerland) Jasmin Preisig | 2–3, 8 |
| (Germany) Max Kruse Racing | Volkswagen Golf GTI TCR | 333 | (Turkey) Emir Asari | 6 |
| (Germany) Max Kruse Racing | Volkswagen Golf GTI TCR | 333 | (United States) Andrew Engelmann | 6 |
| (Germany) Max Kruse Racing | Volkswagen Golf GTI TCR | 333 | (Germany) Andreas Gülden | 6, 9 |
| (Germany) Max Kruse Racing | Volkswagen Golf GTI TCR | 333 | (Denmark) Lars-Erik Nielsen | 7–8 |
| (Germany) Max Kruse Racing | Volkswagen Golf GTI TCR | 333 | (Denmark) 'Peter Hansen' | 7 |
| (Germany) Max Kruse Racing | Volkswagen Golf GTI TCR | 333 | (Germany) Matthias Wasel | 9 |
| (Germany) Schmickler Performance powered by Ravenol | Porsche Cayman GT4 | 212 | (Germany) Markus Schmickler | 1, 3, 5–6, 8–9 |
| (Germany) Schmickler Performance powered by Ravenol | Porsche Cayman GT4 | 212 | (Germany) Achim Wawer | 1, 3, 5–6, 8–9 |
| (Germany) Schmickler Performance powered by Ravenol | Porsche Cayman GT4 | 212 | (Germany) Volker Wawer | 1 |
| (Germany) Schmickler Performance powered by Ravenol | Porsche Cayman GT4 | 212 | (Germany) Claudius Karch | 5–6 |
| (Germany) Schmickler Performance powered by Ravenol | Porsche Cayman GT4 | 212 | (Germany) Carsten Knechtges | 8–9 |
| (Germany) Carlsson Peninsula by Tomcat | Hyundai i30N Fastback | 300 | (Germany) Markus Löw | 9 |
| (Germany) Carlsson Peninsula by Tomcat | Hyundai i30N Fastback | 300 | (Germany) Ralf Goral | 9 |
| (Germany) Profi Car Team Halder | CUPRA León TCR | 307 | (Germany) Michelle Halder | All |
| (Germany) Profi Car Team Halder | CUPRA León TCR | 307 | (Germany) Mike Halder | All |
| (Germany) Profi Car Team Halder | CUPRA León TCR | 307 | (Germany) Meik Utsch | 5–7 |
| (Germany) Team Mathol Racing e.V. | Seat Leon Cup Racer | 311 | (Germany) Jörg Kittelmann | 9 |
| (Germany) Team Mathol Racing e.V. | Seat Leon Cup Racer | 311 | (Germany) Wolfgang Weber | 9 |
| (Germany) MSC Sinzig e.V. im ADAC | Audi RS3 LMS TCR | 313 | (Germany) Rudi Speich | 1–2, 7 |
| (Germany) MSC Sinzig e.V. im ADAC | Audi RS3 LMS TCR | 313 | (Germany) Roland Waschkau | 1–2, 7 |
| (Germany) MSC Sinzig e.V. im ADAC | Audi RS3 LMS TCR | 313 | (Germany) Peter Muggianu | 1, 7 |
| (Germany) MSC Sinzig e.V. im ADAC | Audi RS3 LMS TCR | 313 | (Germany) Arndt Hallmanns | 7 |
| (Germany) MSC Sinzig e.V. im ADAC | Volkswagen Golf GTI TCR | 321 | (Germany) Jens Wulf | 5 |
| (Germany) MSC Sinzig e.V. im ADAC | Volkswagen Golf GTI TCR | 321 | (Germany) Volker Garrn | 5 |
| (Germany) MSC Sinzig e.V. im ADAC | Volkswagen Golf GTI TCR | 321 | (Germany) Ulf Ehninger | 5 |
| (Germany) MSC Sinzig e.V. im ADAC | Volkswagen Golf GTI TCR | 321 | (Germany) Michael Holz | 6 |
| (Germany) MSC Sinzig e.V. im ADAC | Volkswagen Golf GTI TCR | 321 | (Luxembourg) Mike Schmit | 6 |
| (Germany) MSC Sinzig e.V. im ADAC | Volkswagen Golf GTI TCR | 321 | (Germany) Klaus Faßbender | 6 |
| (Germany) Manheller Racing | BMW F30 | 319 | (Germany) Harald Barth | 1 |
| (Germany) Manheller Racing | BMW F30 | 319 | (Germany) Kurt Strube | 1 |
| | BMW 125i | 322 | (Germany) Alexander Mohr | 6 |
| | BMW 125i | 322 | (Germany) Klaus Völker | 6 |
SPPRO
| (Germany) Black Falcon Team IDENTICA | Porsche 911 GT3 Cup MR | 350 | (Germany) Noah Nagelsdiek | 1–6 |
| (Germany) Black Falcon Team IDENTICA | Porsche 911 GT3 Cup MR | 350 | (Germany) Florian Naumann | 1–6 |
| (Germany) Black Falcon Team IDENTICA | Porsche 911 GT3 Cup MR | 350 | (Germany) Hendrik Von Danwitz | 1–6 |
| (Germany) Black Falcon Team IDENTICA | Porsche 911 GT3 Cup MR | 350 | (Netherlands) Paul Harkema | 7–9 |
| (Germany) Black Falcon Team IDENTICA | Porsche 911 GT3 Cup MR | 350 | (Netherlands) Niels Langeveld | 7 |
| (Germany) Black Falcon Team IDENTICA | Porsche 911 GT3 Cup MR | 350 | (Germany) Tobias Müller | 8 |
| (Germany) Black Falcon Team IDENTICA | Porsche 911 GT3 Cup MR | 350 | (Switzerland) Manuel Metzger | 9 |
V6
| (Germany) / Adrenalin Motorsport (Note: Entered as Adrenalin Motorsport at Round 1 and as Adrenalin Motorsport Team Alzner Automotive at Round 2.); (Germany) / Adrenalin Motorsport Team Alzner Automotive | Porsche Cayman S | 396 | (Germany) Christian Büllesbach | All |
| (Germany) / Adrenalin Motorsport; (Germany) / Adrenalin Motorsport Team Alzner Automotive | Porsche Cayman S | 396 | (Germany) Lutz Marc Rühl | All |
| (Germany) / Adrenalin Motorsport; (Germany) / Adrenalin Motorsport Team Alzner Automotive | Porsche Cayman S | 396 | (Germany) Daniel Zils | 1–7, 9 |
| (Germany) / Adrenalin Motorsport; (Germany) / Adrenalin Motorsport Team Alzner Automotive | Porsche Cayman S | 396 | (Germany) Andreas Schettler | 5–9 |
| (Germany) / Adrenalin Motorsport; (Germany) / Adrenalin Motorsport Team Alzner Automotive | Porsche Cayman S | 396 | (Germany) Danny Brink | 8 |
| (Germany) PROsport Racing | Porsche Cayman | 415 | (Belgium) Alexander Hommerson | 1, 3 |
| (Germany) PROsport Racing | Porsche Cayman | 415 | (Germany) Joel Sturm | 1, 3 |
| (Germany) PROsport Racing | Porsche Cayman | 415 | (Belgium) Maxime Dumarey | 2 |
| (Germany) PROsport Racing | Porsche Cayman | 415 | (Belgium) Jean Glorieux | 2 |
| (Germany) Team Mathol Racing | Porsche Cayman | 435 | (Germany) Jusuf Owega | 4, 8 |
| (Germany) Team Mathol Racing | Porsche Cayman | 435 | (Switzerland) Ricardo Feller | 4 |
| (Germany) Team Mathol Racing | Porsche Cayman | 435 | (Germany) Wolfgang Weber | 4 |
| (Germany) Team Mathol Racing | Porsche Cayman | 435 | (Sweden) Tommy Graberg | 5 |
| (Germany) Team Mathol Racing | Porsche Cayman | 435 | (Sweden) Hans Holmlund | 5 |
| (Germany) Team Mathol Racing | Porsche Cayman | 435 | (Poland) Franz Dziwok | 8–9 |
| (Germany) Team Mathol Racing | Porsche Cayman | 435 | (Germany) Donar Munding | 9 |
| (Germany) Team Mathol Racing | Porsche Cayman | 435 | (Germany) Erik Braun | 9 |
V5
| (Germany) PROsport Racing | Porsche Cayman | 437 | (Belgium) Jean Glorieux | 3–4 |
| (Germany) PROsport Racing | Porsche Cayman | 437 | (Belgium) Maxime Dumarey | 3 |
| (Germany) PROsport Racing | Porsche Cayman | 437 | (Belgium) Alexander Hommerson | 4 |
| (Germany) PROsport Racing | Porsche Cayman | 437 | (Belgium) Guillaume Dumarey | 4 |
| (Germany) 9und11 Racing Team | Porsche Cayman | 440 | (Germany) Leonard Oehme | 1–4 |
| (Germany) 9und11 Racing Team | Porsche Cayman | 440 | (Germany) Niklas Oehme | 1–4 |
| (Germany) 9und11 Racing Team | Porsche Cayman | 440 | (Germany) Moritz Oehme | 4 |
| (Germany) / Adrenalin Motorsport; (Germany) / Adrenalin Motorsport Team Alzner Automotive | Porsche Cayman | 444 | (Germany) Tobias Korn | 1–3, 5–9 |
| (Germany) / Adrenalin Motorsport; (Germany) / Adrenalin Motorsport Team Alzner Automotive | Porsche Cayman | 444 | (Germany) Ulrich Korn | 1–3, 5–9 |
| (Germany) / Adrenalin Motorsport; (Germany) / Adrenalin Motorsport Team Alzner Automotive | Porsche Cayman | 444 | (Germany) Daniel Korn | 1–3, 5–8 |
| (Germany) / Adrenalin Motorsport; (Germany) / Adrenalin Motorsport Team Alzner Automotive | Porsche Cayman | 444 | (Netherlands) Loek Hartog | 9 |
| (Germany) rent2drive-FAMILIA-racing | Porsche Cayman | 445 | (Germany) Holger Gachot | 1–2, 4, 7–9 |
| (Germany) rent2drive-FAMILIA-racing | Porsche Cayman | 445 | (Germany) Sophia Gachot | 1–2, 4, 7–8 |
| (Germany) rent2drive-FAMILIA-racing | Porsche Cayman | 445 | (Germany) Jörg Wiskirchen | 1, 9 |
| (Germany) rent2drive-FAMILIA-racing | Porsche Cayman | 445 | (Germany) David Ackermann | 2, 7 |
| (Germany) rent2drive-FAMILIA-racing | Porsche Cayman | 445 | (Germany) Karl Pflanz | 4 |
| (Germany) rent2drive-FAMILIA-racing | Porsche Cayman | 445 | (Germany) Michael Küchenmeister | 7 |
| (Germany) rent2drive-FAMILIA-racing | Porsche Cayman | 445 | (Germany) Philip Ade | 8 |
| (Germany) rent2drive-FAMILIA-racing | Porsche Cayman | 445 | (Germany) Raphael Klingmann | 9 |
| (Germany) / NEXEN TIRE Motorsports by KRS (Note: Entered as NEXEN TIRE Motorsports by KRS at Round 1 and as Team Young KRS Danes at Round 2.); (Germany) / Team Young KRS Danes | Porsche Cayman | 456 | (Germany) Jochen Krumbach | 1 |
| (Germany) / NEXEN TIRE Motorsports by KRS; (Germany) / Team Young KRS Danes | Porsche Cayman | 456 | (Denmark) Lucas Daugaard | 2–9 |
| (Germany) / NEXEN TIRE Motorsports by KRS; (Germany) / Team Young KRS Danes | Porsche Cayman | 456 | (Denmark) Kaj Schubert | 2–9 |
| (Germany) W&S Motorsport | Porsche Cayman | 460 | (Germany) Kevin Rembert | All |
| (Germany) W&S Motorsport | Porsche Cayman | 460 | (Germany) René Höber | 1–8 |
| (Germany) W&S Motorsport | Porsche Cayman | 460 | (France) Sébastian Perrot | 1–6 |
| (Germany) W&S Motorsport | Porsche Cayman | 460 | (Germany) Nicals Wiedmann | 7–9 |
| (Germany) W&S Motorsport | Porsche Cayman | 460 | (Switzerland) Urs Zünd | 7 |
| (Germany) W&S Motorsport | Porsche Cayman | 461 | (Germany) Michael Joos | 1–2 |
| (Germany) W&S Motorsport | Porsche Cayman | 461 | (Germany) Walter Schweikart | 1–2 |
| (Germany) W&S Motorsport | Porsche Cayman | 461 | (Germany) Dirk Biermann | 5–6, 9 |
| (Germany) W&S Motorsport | Porsche Cayman | 461 | (Germany) Nicals Wiedmann | 5–6 |
| (Germany) W&S Motorsport | Porsche Cayman | 461 | (Germany) Markus Brändle | 5–6 |
| (Germany) W&S Motorsport | Porsche Cayman | 461 | (Germany) René Höber | 9 |
VT3
| (Germany) PROsport Racing | Porsche Cayman | 471 | (Argentina) Nestor Girolami | 1–2 |
| (Germany) PROsport Racing | Porsche Cayman | 471 | (Poland) Robert Kubica | 1 |
| (Germany) PROsport Racing | Porsche Cayman | 471 | (Belgium) Alexander Hommerson | 2 |
| (Germany) PROsport Racing | Porsche Cayman | 471 | (Germany) Arno Klasen | 5–6 |
| (Germany) PROsport Racing | Porsche Cayman | 471 | (Sweden) Eric Ullström | 5–6 |
| (Germany) Team Mathol Racing e.V. | Porsche 718 Cayman GT4 Clubsport | 474 | (Germany) Alex Fielenbach | All |
| (Germany) Team Mathol Racing e.V. | Porsche 718 Cayman GT4 Clubsport | 474 | (Germany) Wolfgang Weber | All |
| (Germany) Team Mathol Racing e.V. | Porsche 718 Cayman GT4 Clubsport | 474 | (Switzerland) Ricardo Feller | 3–4 |
| (Germany) Team Mathol Racing e.V. | Porsche 718 Cayman GT4 Clubsport | 474 | (Germany) Oliver Louisoder | 5–6 |
| (Germany) Team Mathol Racing e.V. | Porsche 718 Cayman GT4 Clubsport | 474 | (Germany) Thorsten Held | 7 |
| (Germany) Team Mathol Racing e.V. | Porsche 718 Cayman GT4 Clubsport | 474 | (Germany) Jusuf Owega | 8 |
| (Germany) Team Mathol Racing e.V. | Porsche 718 Cayman GT4 Clubsport | 474 | (United States) Robb Holland | 9 |
| (Germany) Team Mathol Racing e.V. | Porsche 718 Cayman GT4 Clubsport | 474 | (Germany) Patrick Steinmetz | 9 |
VT2
| (Germany) / Adrenalin Motorsport; (Germany) / Adrenalin Motorsport Team Alzner Automotive | BMW 330i Racing (2020) | 481 | (Germany) Christopher Rink | All |
| (Germany) / Adrenalin Motorsport; (Germany) / Adrenalin Motorsport Team Alzner Automotive | BMW 330i Racing (2020) | 481 | (Germany) Philipp Stahlschmidt | All |
| (Germany) / Adrenalin Motorsport; (Germany) / Adrenalin Motorsport Team Alzner Automotive | BMW 330i Racing (2020) | 481 | (Germany) Daniel Zils | All |
| (Germany) / Adrenalin Motorsport; (Germany) / Adrenalin Motorsport Team Alzner Automotive | BMW 330i Racing (2020) | 482 | (Germany) Uwe Ebertz | All |
| (Germany) / Adrenalin Motorsport; (Germany) / Adrenalin Motorsport Team Alzner Automotive | BMW 330i Racing (2020) | 482 | (Germany) Jacob Erlbacher | All |
| (Germany) / Adrenalin Motorsport; (Germany) / Adrenalin Motorsport Team Alzner Automotive | BMW 330i Racing (2020) | 482 | (Liechtenstein) Fabienne Wohlwend | 1–3 |
| (Germany) / Adrenalin Motorsport; (Germany) / Adrenalin Motorsport Team Alzner Automotive | BMW 330i Racing (2020) | 482 | (Germany) Marvin Kobus | 4–6 |
| (Germany) / Adrenalin Motorsport; (Germany) / Adrenalin Motorsport Team Alzner Automotive | BMW 330i Racing (2020) | 482 | (Netherlands) Loek Hartog | 7 |
| (Germany) / Adrenalin Motorsport; (Germany) / Adrenalin Motorsport Team Alzner Automotive | BMW 330i Racing (2020) | 482 | (Norway) Sindre Setsaas | 7 |
| (Germany) / Adrenalin Motorsport; (Germany) / Adrenalin Motorsport Team Alzner Automotive | BMW 330i Racing (2020) | 482 | (Germany) Matthias Malmedie | 8 |
| (Germany) / Adrenalin Motorsport; (Germany) / Adrenalin Motorsport Team Alzner Automotive | BMW 330i Racing (2020) | 482 | (Austria) Markus Flasch | 9 |
| (Germany) JS Competition | BMW F12 125i | 483 | (Germany) Matthias Möller | All |
| (Germany) JS Competition | BMW F12 125i | 483 | (Germany) Fabian Pirrone | 1–7 |
| (Germany) JS Competition | BMW F12 125i | 483 | (Germany) Detlef Stelbrink | 4–6, 8–9 |
| (Germany) FK Performance Motorsport | BMW 330i Racing (2020) | 485 | (Switzerland) Ranko Mijatovic | All |
| (Germany) FK Performance Motorsport | BMW 330i Racing (2020) | 485 | (Germany) Alexander Müller | 1–2 |
| (Germany) FK Performance Motorsport | BMW 330i Racing (2020) | 485 | (Germany) Andreas Ott | 1 |
| (Germany) FK Performance Motorsport | BMW 330i Racing (2020) | 485 | (Germany) Christian Konnerth | 2–9 |
| (Germany) FK Performance Motorsport | BMW 330i Racing (2020) | 485 | (United Kingdom) Ben Green | 3, 7 |
| (Germany) FK Performance Motorsport | BMW 330i Racing (2020) | 485 | (Switzerland) Yann Zimmer | 4, 7 |
| (Germany) FK Performance Motorsport | BMW 330i Racing (2020) | 485 | (Germany) Jens Moetefindt | 5–6 |
| (Germany) Team AVIA Sorg Rennsport | BMW 330i Racing (2020) | 487 | (United Kingdom) Pippa Mann | 2–3 |
| (Germany) Team AVIA Sorg Rennsport | BMW 330i Racing (2020) | 487 | (Denmark) Christina Nielsen | 2–3 |
| (Germany) Team AVIA Sorg Rennsport | BMW 330i Racing (2020) | 487 | (United Kingdom) Matt Brookes | 3 |
| (Germany) Team AVIA Sorg Rennsport | BMW 330i Racing (2020) | 487 | (Italy) Alberto Carobbio | 5 |
| (Germany) Team AVIA Sorg Rennsport | BMW 330i Racing (2020) | 487 | (Italy) Ugo Vicenzi | 5 |
| (Germany) Team AVIA Sorg Rennsport | BMW 330i Racing (2020) | 487 | (Finland) Hannu Karesola | 5 |
| (Germany) Team AVIA Sorg Rennsport | BMW 330i Racing (2020) | 487 | (Turkey) Emir Asari | 6–9 |
| (Germany) Team AVIA Sorg Rennsport | BMW 330i Racing (2020) | 487 | (United Kingdom) Moran Gott | 6–9 |
| (Germany) Team AVIA Sorg Rennsport | BMW 330i Racing (2020) | 487 | (United Kingdom) Brett Lidsey | 7–9 |
| (Germany) Team AVIA Sorg Rennsport | BMW 330i Racing (2020) | 488 | (Denmark) Rasmus Helmich | 1–6, 8–9 |
| (Germany) Team AVIA Sorg Rennsport | BMW 330i Racing (2020) | 488 | (Austria) Martin Lechmann | 1–2 |
| (Germany) Team AVIA Sorg Rennsport | BMW 330i Racing (2020) | 488 | (United Kingdom) Pippa Mann | 1 |
| (Germany) Team AVIA Sorg Rennsport | BMW 330i Racing (2020) | 488 | (Germany) Philip Schauerte | 2–4, 6–8 |
| (Germany) Team AVIA Sorg Rennsport | BMW 330i Racing (2020) | 488 | (Italy) Francesco Bugane | 3, 5 |
| (Germany) Team AVIA Sorg Rennsport | BMW 330i Racing (2020) | 488 | (Finland) Philip Miemois | 4–7 |
| (Germany) Team AVIA Sorg Rennsport | BMW 330i Racing (2020) | 488 | (United States) Andrew Engelmann | 5, 7–8 |
| (Germany) Team AVIA Sorg Rennsport | BMW 330i Racing (2020) | 488 | (Ukraine) Dmytro Ryzhak | 7 |
| (Germany) Team AVIA Sorg Rennsport | BMW 330i Racing (2020) | 488 | (Denmark) Frederik Schandorff | 9 |
| (Germany) Team AVIA Sorg Rennsport | BMW 330i Racing (2020) | 488 | (United Kingdom) Casper Stevenson | 9 |
| (Germany) Team AVIA Sorg Rennsport | BMW 330i Racing (2020) | 504 | (Italy) Edorado Bugane | All |
| (Germany) Team AVIA Sorg Rennsport | BMW 330i Racing (2020) | 504 | (Germany) Stephan Epp | All |
| (Germany) Team AVIA Sorg Rennsport | BMW 330i Racing (2020) | 504 | (Germany) Björn Simon | All |
| (Germany) Giti Tire Motorsport By WS Racing | Volkswagen Golf VII GTI | 490 | (Germany) Axel Jahn | All |
| (Germany) Giti Tire Motorsport By WS Racing | Volkswagen Golf VII GTI | 490 | (Switzerland) Sean Fuster | 1–4, 7–8 |
| (Germany) Giti Tire Motorsport By WS Racing | Volkswagen Golf VII GTI | 490 | (Switzerland) Sven Friesecke | 1–3 |
| (Germany) Giti Tire Motorsport By WS Racing | Volkswagen Golf VII GTI | 490 | (Germany) Ulrich Schmidt | 4, 8–9 |
| (Germany) Giti Tire Motorsport By WS Racing | Volkswagen Golf VII GTI | 490 | (Germany) Lutz Wolzenburg | 4, 6–7 |
| (Germany) Giti Tire Motorsport By WS Racing | Volkswagen Golf VII GTI | 490 | (Germany) Max Kuhnhenn | 5–6 |
| (Germany) Giti Tire Motorsport By WS Racing | Volkswagen Golf VII GTI | 490 | (Germany) Mario Handrick | 5 |
| (Germany) Giti Tire Motorsport By WS Racing | Volkswagen Golf VII GTI | 490 | (Germany) Robert Hinzer | 9 |
| (Germany) Giti Tire Motorsport By WS Racing | BMW 328i Racing | 491 | (Germany) Niklas Kry | 1–6, 8–9 |
| (Germany) Giti Tire Motorsport By WS Racing | BMW 328i Racing | 491 | (Denmark) Nicolaj Kandborg | 1–6 |
| (Germany) Giti Tire Motorsport By WS Racing | BMW 328i Racing | 491 | (Germany) Tobias Wolf | 1–3 |
| (Germany) Giti Tire Motorsport By WS Racing | BMW 328i Racing | 491 | (Germany) Nils Steinberg | 4, 8–9 |
| (Germany) Giti Tire Motorsport By WS Racing | BMW 328i Racing | 491 | (Germany) Alesia Kreutzpointner | 5 |
| (Germany) Giti Tire Motorsport By WS Racing | BMW 328i Racing | 491 | (Germany) Jacqueline Kreutzpointner | 6 |
| (Germany) Giti Tire Motorsport By WS Racing | BMW 328i Racing | 491 | (Germany) Andrei Sidorenko | 8–9 |
| (Germany) Giti Tire Motorsport By WS Racing | BMW 328i Racing | 492 | (Germany) Nils Steinberg | 1–3 |
| (Germany) Giti Tire Motorsport By WS Racing | BMW 328i Racing | 492 | (Germany) Andrei Sidorenko | 1–3 |
| (Germany) Giti Tire Motorsport By WS Racing | BMW 328i Racing | 492 | (Denmark) Christina Nielsen | 1 |
| (Germany) Giti Tire Motorsport By WS Racing | BMW 328i Racing | 492 | (Germany) Ulrich Schmidt | 2–3 |
| (Germany) Waldow Performance | Renault Mégane III RS | 493 | (Germany) Carsten Erpenbach | 1–6 |
| (Germany) Waldow Performance | Renault Mégane III RS | 493 | (Germany) Ralf Wiesner | 1–6 |
| (Germany) rent2drive-FAMILIA-racing | Renault Mégane III RS | 494 | (Germany) David Ackermann | 1, 9 |
| (Germany) rent2drive-FAMILIA-racing | Renault Mégane III RS | 494 | (Austria) Constantin Schöll | 1 |
| (Germany) rent2drive-FAMILIA-racing | Renault Mégane III RS | 494 | (Italy) Aleardo Bertelli | 4, 8–9 |
| (Germany) rent2drive-FAMILIA-racing | Renault Mégane III RS | 494 | (Italy) Stefano Croci | 4, 8–9 |
| (Germany) rent2drive-FAMILIA-racing | Renault Mégane III RS | 494 | (Italy) Graziano Grazzini | 4, 8 |
| (Germany) Manheller Racing | BMW 328i Racing | 495 | (Argentina) Andres Bruno Josephsohn | 4–6 |
| (Germany) Manheller Racing | BMW 328i Racing | 495 | (Argentina) Carlos Federico Braga | 4 |
| (Germany) Manheller Racing | BMW 328i Racing | 495 | (Argentina) Alejandro Chahwan | 5–6 |
| (Germany) Manheller Racing | BMW 328i Racing | 495 | (Argentina) Facundo Chahwan | 5–6 |
| (Germany) Manheller Racing | BMW 328i Racing | 495 | (Germany) Marcel Manheller | 8–9 |
| (Germany) Manheller Racing | BMW 328i Racing | 495 | (Germany) Kurt Strube | 8–9 |
| (Germany) Manheller Racing | BMW 328i Racing | 495 | (Germany) Stefan Jöcker | 8 |
| (Germany) Manheller Racing | BMW 328i Racing | 495 | (Germany) Harald Barth | 9 |
| (Germany) Manheller Racing | BMW 328i Racing | 510 | (Germany) Carsten Knechtges | 1, 3–7 |
| (Germany) Manheller Racing | BMW 328i Racing | 510 | (Germany) Marcel Manheller | 1 |
| (Germany) Manheller Racing | BMW 328i Racing | 510 | (Germany) Josef Knechtges | 3 |
| (Germany) Manheller Racing | BMW 328i Racing | 510 | (Germany) Kurt Strube | 3–7 |
| (Germany) Manheller Racing | BMW 328i Racing | 510 | (Germany) Harald Barth | 4–7 |
| (Germany) WAGNER TUNING Team Mertens Motorsport | Hyundai i30 Fastback N | 496 | (Germany) Daniel Mertens | 1–5, 7–9 |
| (Germany) WAGNER TUNING Team Mertens Motorsport | Hyundai i30 Fastback N | 496 | (Germany) Achim Feinen | 5 |
| (Germany) WAGNER TUNING Team Mertens Motorsport | Hyundai i30 Fastback N | 496 | (United States) Jeffrey Robert Ricca | 7–8 |
| (Germany) MSC Wahlscheid Keeevin Sports & Racing | Renault Mégane III RS | 499 | (Germany) Christian Albinger | 2–4, 6–8 |
| (Germany) MSC Wahlscheid Keeevin Sports & Racing | Renault Mégane III RS | 499 | (Germany) Kevin Wolters | 2–4 |
| (Germany) MSC Wahlscheid Keeevin Sports & Racing | Renault Mégane III RS | 499 | (Germany) Andreas Tasche | 2–3, 6 |
| (Germany) MSC Wahlscheid Keeevin Sports & Racing | Renault Mégane III RS | 499 | (Germany) Thomas Mennecke | 6 |
| (Germany) MSC Wahlscheid Keeevin Sports & Racing | Renault Mégane III RS | 499 | (Germany) Olaf Hoppelshäuser | 7–9 |
| (Germany) MSC Wahlscheid Keeevin Sports & Racing | Renault Mégane III RS | 499 | (Germany) Christian Meurer | 7 |
| (Germany) MSC Wahlscheid Keeevin Sports & Racing | Renault Mégane III RS | 499 | (Germany) Thomas Plum | 7 |
| (Germany) MSC Wahlscheid Keeevin Sports & Racing | Renault Mégane III RS | 499 | (Germany) Uwe Stein | 9 |
| (Germany) MSC Wahlscheid Keeevin Sports & Racing | Renault Mégane III RS | 499 | (Germany) Dominik Lanz | 9 |
| (Germany) mathilda racing | Volkswagen Scirocco R N24 | 500 | (Germany) Timo Beuth | All |
| (Germany) mathilda racing | Volkswagen Scirocco R N24 | 500 | (Spain) Mikel Azcona | 2 |
| (Germany) mathilda racing | Volkswagen Scirocco R N24 | 500 | (Germany) Timo Hochwind | 3–7 |
| (Germany) mathilda racing | Volkswagen Scirocco R N24 | 500 | (Germany) Michael Paatz | 5–7 |
| (Germany) mathilda racing | Volkswagen Scirocco R N24 | 500 | (Germany) Carsten Erpenbach | 8 |
| (Germany) mathilda racing | Volkswagen Scirocco R N24 | 500 | (Germany) Ralf Wiesner | 8 |
| (Germany) mathilda racing | Volkswagen Scirocco R N24 | 500 | (Germany) Josef Kocsis | 9 |
| (Germany) MSC Adenau | Opel Astra OPC Cup | 501 | (Germany) Tobias Jung | 1–2, 4–5, 7, 9 |
| (Germany) MSC Adenau | Opel Astra OPC Cup | 501 | (Germany) Lars Füting | 1–2 |
| (Germany) MSC Adenau | Opel Astra OPC Cup | 501 | (Germany) Tim Robertz | 1–2 |
| (Germany) MSC Adenau | Opel Astra OPC Cup | 501 | (Germany) Markus Weinstock | 5 |
| (Germany) MSC Adenau | Opel Astra OPC Cup | 501 | (Germany) Michael Eichhorn | 7, 9 |
| (Germany) MSC Adenau | Opel Astra OPC Cup | 501 | (France) Jean-Marc Finot | 7 |
| (Germany) MSC Adenau | Opel Astra OPC Cup | 501 | (Germany) Andre Kern | 9 |
| (Germany) MSC Adenau | Opel Astra OPC Cup | 502 | (Germany) Lars Füting | 9 |
| (Germany) MSC Adenau | Opel Astra OPC Cup | 502 | (Switzerland) Herbert Schmidt | 9 |
| (Germany) MSC Adenau | Opel Astra OPC Cup | 502 | (Germany) Yannick Bieniek | 9 |
| (Germany) MSC Adenau | SEAT León | 511 | (Germany) Marcel Senn | 5, 9 |
| (Germany) MSC Adenau | SEAT León | 511 | (Germany) Oliver Füllgrabe | 5, 9 |
| (Germany) ROJA Motorsport by ASL Lichtblau | Hyundai i30 Fastback N | 502 | (Sweden) Jan Bäckman | 2–3 |
| (Germany) ROJA Motorsport by ASL Lichtblau | Hyundai i30 Fastback N | 502 | (Sweden) Jessica Bäckman | 2–3 |
| (Germany) ROJA Motorsport by ASL Lichtblau | Hyundai i30 Fastback N | 502 | (Germany) Olaf Jahr | 2 |
| (Germany) ROJA Motorsport by ASL Lichtblau | Hyundai i30 Fastback N | 503 | (Germany) Felix Schumann | 1–6 |
| (Germany) ROJA Motorsport by ASL Lichtblau | Hyundai i30 Fastback N | 503 | (France) Jean Karl Vernay | 1–3 |
| (Germany) ROJA Motorsport by ASL Lichtblau | Hyundai i30 Fastback N | 503 | (Germany) Luca Engstler | 1–2 |
| (Germany) ROJA Motorsport by ASL Lichtblau | Hyundai i30 Fastback N | 503 | (Germany) Olaf Jahr | 3 |
| (Germany) ROJA Motorsport by ASL Lichtblau | Hyundai i30 Fastback N | 503 | (Germany) Robin Jahr | 4–6 |
| | BMW 330i Racing (2020) | 505 | (Germany) Dr. Anton Hahnenkamm | 1–8 |
| | BMW 330i Racing (2020) | 505 | (Germany) Marcus Willhardt | 1–3, 7 |
| | BMW 330i Racing (2020) | 505 | (Germany) Stephan Köpple | 1–2, 4, 7 |
| | BMW 330i Racing (2020) | 505 | (Germany) Jerome Larbi | 3–4, 7 |
| | BMW 330i Racing (2020) | 505 | (Germany) Klaus Dieter Frommer | 5–6 |
| | BMW 330i Racing (2020) | 505 | (Germany) 'Moritz' | 5–6 |
| | BMW 330i Racing (2020) | 505 | (Germany) Florian Quante | 8–9 |
| | BMW 330i Racing (2020) | 505 | (Germany) Christian Knötschke | 9 |
| | BMW 330i Racing (2020) | 505 | (Switzerland) Roland Schmid | 9 |
| | Opel Astra OPC Cup | 506 | (Germany) Lars Füting | 3 |
| | Opel Astra OPC Cup | 506 | (Germany) Tim Robertz | 3 |
| | Opel Astra OPC Cup | 506 | (Switzerland) Herbert Schmidt | 3 |
| | Renault Mégane | 507 | (Luxembourg) John Marechal | 5–6 |
| | Renault Mégane | 507 | (Germany) Bernhard Sax | 5–6 |
| | Renault Mégane | 507 | (Luxembourg) Paul Marechal | 5 |
| | Renault Mégane | 507 | (Luxembourg) Max Lamesch | 6 |
| | BMW 330i Racing (2020) | 509 | (Luxembourg) Graham Wilson | 5–7 |
| | BMW 330i Racing (2020) | 509 | (Germany) Timothy Morley | 5–7 |
| | BMW 330i Racing (2020) | 509 | (United States) Robert Stretch | 5–6 |
| | BMW 330i Racing (2020) | 509 | (Germany) Andreas Ecker | 9 |
| | BMW 330i Racing (2020) | 509 | (Germany) Tassilo Zumpe | 9 |
| | Volkswagen Scirocco RMS | 515 | (Italy) Florian Haller | 6 |
| | Volkswagen Scirocco RMS | 515 | (Germany) Olaf Rost | 6 |
| | Volkswagen Scirocco RMS | 515 | (Germany) Kevin Olaf Rost | 6 |
| | Renault Mégane | 520 | (Finland) Mika Kitola | 4 |
H4
| | BMW M3 GTR | 600 | (Germany) Bernd Kleeschulte | 1 |
| | BMW M3 GTR | 600 | (Germany) Karl Pflanz | 1 |
| (Switzerland) Hofor Racing | BMW M3 CSL | 602 | (Switzerland) Martin Kroll | 9 |
| (Switzerland) Hofor Racing | BMW M3 CSL | 602 | (Switzerland) Michael Kroll | 9 |
| (Switzerland) Hofor Racing | BMW M3 CSL | 602 | (Switzerland) Chantal Prinz | 9 |
| (Switzerland) Hofor Racing | BMW M3 CSL | 602 | (Switzerland) Alexander Prinz | 9 |
| (Switzerland) Hofor Racing | BMW M3 GTR | 610 | (Switzerland) Michael Kroll | 4–6 |
| (Switzerland) Hofor Racing | BMW M3 GTR | 610 | (Switzerland) Alexander Prinz | 4–6 |
| (Switzerland) Hofor Racing | BMW M3 GTR | 610 | (Switzerland) Chantal Prinz | 4–5 |
| (Switzerland) Hofor Racing | BMW M3 GTR | 610 | (Switzerland) Martin Kroll | 5–6 |
| | Porsche 997 GT3 Cup | 606 | (Germany) Ralf Schall | 2 |
H2
| (Germany) Automobilclub von Deutschland | Opel Manta (Flying Fox) GT | 601 | (Germany) Olaf Beckmann | 1 |
| (Germany) Automobilclub von Deutschland | Opel Manta (Flying Fox) GT | 601 | (Germany) Peter Hass | 1 |
| (Germany) Automobilclub von Deutschland | Opel Manta (Flying Fox) GT | 601 | (Germany) Jürgen Schulten | 1 |
| (Germany) Automobilclub von Deutschland | Opel Manta (Flying Fox) GT | 601 | (Germany) Volker Strycek | 1 |
| | Honda Civic Type-R | 611 | (Germany) Timo Drössiger | 1–3, 5–7, 9 |
| | Honda Civic Type-R | 611 | (Germany) Mark Giesbrecht | 1–3, 5–7, 9 |
| | Honda Civic Type-R | 611 | (Germany) Frank Kuhlmann | 1–3, 5–7, 9 |
| (Belgium) Nationale Autoclub Excelsior | BMW 318i | 612 | (Belgium) Ludo Stessens | 6–7, 9 |
| (Belgium) Nationale Autoclub Excelsior | BMW 318i | 612 | (Belgium) Marc Stessens | 6–7, 9 |
| (Belgium) Nationale Autoclub Excelsior | BMW 318i | 612 | (Belgium) Ken Stessens | 6–7, 9 |
| | Renault Clio | 614 | (Germany) Daniel Overbeck | 1–4, 7–9 |
| | Renault Clio | 614 | (Germany) Tobias Overbeck | 1–4, 7–9 |
| (Germany) aufkleben.de – Motorsport | Renault Clio | 620 | (Germany) Michael Uelwer | 3–4, 7–9 |
| (Germany) aufkleben.de – Motorsport | Renault Clio | 620 | (Germany) Dr. Volker Kühn | 3–4, 7–9 |
| (Germany) aufkleben.de – Motorsport | Renault Clio | 620 | (Germany) Stephan Epp | 3–4, 7–9 |
| (Germany) aufkleben.de – Motorsport | Renault Clio | 620 | (Germany) Andreas Winterwerber | 3 |
| (Germany) aufkleben.de – Motorsport | Renault Clio | 620 | (Germany) Niklas Meisenzahl | 7 |
| (Germany) aufkleben.de – Motorsport | Renault Clio | 630 | (Germany) Dr. Volker Kühn | 1–2 |
| (Germany) aufkleben.de – Motorsport | Renault Clio | 630 | (Germany) Michael Uelwer | 1–2 |
| (Germany) aufkleben.de – Motorsport | Renault Clio | 630 | (Germany) Andreas Winterwerber | 1–2 |
| (Germany) MSC Sinzig e.V. im ADAC | Renault Clio | 621 | (France) Nathanaël Berthon | 1–3 |
| (Germany) MSC Sinzig e.V. im ADAC | Renault Clio | 621 | (Germany) Achim Ewenz | 1, 5 |
| (Germany) MSC Sinzig e.V. im ADAC | Renault Clio | 621 | (Germany) Kai Rabenschlag | 1 |
| (Germany) MSC Sinzig e.V. im ADAC | Renault Clio | 621 | (Germany) Marius Rauer | 2–4 |
| (Germany) MSC Sinzig e.V. im ADAC | Renault Clio | 621 | (Germany) Marek Schaller | 2–4 |
| (Germany) MSC Sinzig e.V. im ADAC | Renault Clio | 621 | (Sweden) Andreas Andersson | 4, 6 |
| (Germany) MSC Sinzig e.V. im ADAC | Renault Clio | 621 | (Germany) Christian Schier | 5–6 |
| (Germany) MSC Sinzig e.V. im ADAC | Renault Clio | 621 | (Germany) Ralph Liesenfeld | 5 |
| (Germany) MSC Sinzig e.V. im ADAC | Renault Clio | 621 | (Germany) Moritz Oehme | 7–8 |
| (Germany) MSC Sinzig e.V. im ADAC | Renault Clio | 621 | (Finland) Alec Arho Havren | 7 |
| (Germany) MSC Sinzig e.V. im ADAC | Renault Clio | 621 | (Italy) Simone Sama | 7 |
| (Germany) MSC Sinzig e.V. im ADAC | Renault Clio | 621 | (Germany) Andre Triesch | 7 |
| (Germany) MSC Sinzig e.V. im ADAC | Renault Clio | 621 | (Germany) David Novakowski | 8–9 |
| (Germany) MSC Sinzig e.V. im ADAC | Renault Clio | 621 | (France) Tommy Fortchantre | 9 |
| (Germany) MSC Sinzig e.V. im ADAC | Renault Clio | 621 | (Denmark) Mikkel Mac | 9 |
| (Germany) MSC Sinzig e.V. im ADAC | Volkswagen Golf 3 | 622 | (Germany) Ralph Liesenfeld | 7 |
| (Germany) MSC Sinzig e.V. im ADAC | Volkswagen Golf 3 | 622 | (Germany) Carsten Erpenbach | 7 |
| (Germany) MSC Sinzig e.V. im ADAC | Volkswagen Golf 3 | 622 | (Germany) Christian Schier | 7 |
| | BMW E36 | 623 | (Germany) Dr. Romeo Loewe | 7, 9 |
| | BMW E36 | 623 | (Germany) Dr. Anna Loewe | 7, 9 |
| | BMW M3 | 626 | (Germany) Konstantin Wolf | 2 |
| | BMW M3 | 626 | (Germany) Christian Hirsch | 2 |
| (Germany) MSC Adenau | Renault Clio | 685 | (Germany) Michael Bohrer | All |
| (Germany) MSC Adenau | Renault Clio | 685 | (Germany) Gerrit Holthaus | All |
| (Germany) MSC Adenau | Renault Clio | 685 | (Germany) Marc Wylach | All |
AT(-G)
| (Germany) Four Motors | Porsche 991 GT3 Cup Gen II | 320 | (Germany) 'Tom' | 3, 5–7 |
| (Germany) Four Motors | Porsche 991 GT3 Cup Gen II | 320 | (Germany) Thomas Kiefer | 3, 5–7 |
| (Germany) Four Motors | Porsche 991 GT3 Cup Gen II | 320 | (Luxembourg) Charles Kauffman | 3, 5–7 |
| (Germany) Four Motors | Porsche 991 GT3 Cup Gen II | 320 | (Germany) 'Smudo' | 3, 7 |
| (Germany) Four Motors | Porsche Cayman GT4 | 420 | (Germany) Matthias Beckwermert | 3, 5–8 |
| (Germany) Four Motors | Porsche Cayman GT4 | 420 | (Germany) Immanuel Vinke | 3, 5–8 |
| (Germany) Four Motors | Porsche Cayman GT4 | 420 | (Denmark) Henrik Bollerslev | 3, 5–7 |
| (Germany) Four Motors | Porsche Cayman GT4 | 420 | (Germany) Welf Hermann | 3 |
| (Germany) Four Motors | Porsche Cayman GT4 | 420 | (Germany) 'Smudo' | 8 |
| (Germany) Four Motors | Porsche Cayman GT4 | 633 | (Germany) Welf Hermann | 2, 5–6 |
| (Germany) Four Motors | Porsche Cayman GT4 | 633 | (Switzerland) Simona de Silvestro | 2, 8 |
| (Germany) Four Motors | Porsche Cayman GT4 | 633 | (Switzerland) Marco Timbal | 3, 7–8 |
| (Germany) Four Motors | Porsche Cayman GT4 | 633 | (Switzerland) Ivan Reggiani | 3, 7 |
| (Germany) Four Motors | Porsche Cayman GT4 | 633 | (Switzerland) Nicola Bravetti | 3, 7 |
| (Germany) Four Motors | Porsche Cayman GT4 | 633 | (Germany) Karl Pflanz | 5–6 |
| (Germany) Four Motors | Porsche Cayman GT4 | 633 | (New Zealand) Jaxon Evans | 8 |
| | Ford Mustang GT | 636 | (Germany) Oliver Sprungmann | 2, 5–6 |
| | Ford Mustang GT | 636 | (Germany) Ralph Caba | 2, 5–6 |
M240i
| (Germany) Adrenalin Motorsport Team Alzner Automotive | BMW M240i Racing | 650 | (Switzerland) Dominic Tranchet | 4 |
| (Germany) Adrenalin Motorsport Team Alzner Automotive | BMW M240i Racing | 650 | (Germany) Ulrich Korn | 4 |
| (Germany) Adrenalin Motorsport Team Alzner Automotive | BMW M240i Racing | 650 | (Germany) Tobias Korn | 4 |
| (Germany) Adrenalin Motorsport Team Alzner Automotive | BMW M240i Racing | 650 | (Germany) Lars Harbeck | 5–9 |
| (Germany) Adrenalin Motorsport Team Alzner Automotive | BMW M240i Racing | 650 | (Germany) Sven Markert | 5–9 |
| (Germany) Adrenalin Motorsport Team Alzner Automotive | BMW M240i Racing | 650 | (Germany) Andreas Winkler | 5–6 |
| (Germany) Adrenalin Motorsport Team Alzner Automotive | BMW M240i Racing | 650 | (Germany) Robin Reimer | 7–9 |
| (Germany) Adrenalin Motorsport Team Alzner Automotive | BMW M240i Racing | 650 | (Italy) Rudolfo Funaro | 7 |
| (Germany) Adrenalin Motorsport Team Alzner Automotive | BMW M240i Racing | 650 | (Switzerland) Michael Lüthi | 8 |
| (Germany) Adrenalin Motorsport Team Alzner Automotive | BMW M240i Racing | 652 | (Germany) Laura Luft | 5–6 |
| (Germany) Adrenalin Motorsport Team Alzner Automotive | BMW M240i Racing | 652 | (Germany) Herwarth Wartenberg | 5–6 |
| (Germany) Adrenalin Motorsport Team Alzner Automotive | BMW M240i Racing | 652 | (Germany) Sarah Ganser | 5 |
| (Germany) Adrenalin Motorsport Team Alzner Automotive | BMW M240i Racing | 652 | (United Kingdom) Jake Dennis | 7–8 |
| (Germany) Adrenalin Motorsport Team Alzner Automotive | BMW M240i Racing | 652 | (Germany) Niklas Krütten | 7–8 |
| (Germany) Adrenalin Motorsport Team Alzner Automotive | BMW M240i Racing | 652 | (Switzerland) Michael Lüthi | 9 |
| (Germany) Adrenalin Motorsport Team Alzner Automotive | BMW M240i Racing | 652 | (Italy) Rudolfo Funaro | 9 |
| (Germany) Adrenalin Motorsport Team Alzner Automotive | BMW M240i Racing | 652 | (Germany) 'Jacob Schell' | 9 |
| (Germany) Adrenalin Motorsport Team Alzner Automotive | BMW M240i Racing | 653 | (Germany) 'Jacob Schell' | 7–8 |
| (Germany) Adrenalin Motorsport Team Alzner Automotive | BMW M240i Racing | 653 | (Germany) 'Rodriguez Menzl' | 7–8 |
| (Germany) Adrenalin Motorsport Team Alzner Automotive | BMW M240i Racing | 653 | (Belgium) Guillaume Dumarey | 7 |
| (Germany) Adrenalin Motorsport Team Alzner Automotive | BMW M240i Racing | 653 | (Norway) Sindre Setsaas | 8 |
| (Germany) Adrenalin Motorsport Team Alzner Automotive | BMW M240i Racing | 653 | (Luxembourg) Max Lamesch | 9 |
| (Germany) Adrenalin Motorsport Team Alzner Automotive | BMW M240i Racing | 653 | (Switzerland) André Stutz | 9 |
| (Germany) Adrenalin Motorsport Team Alzner Automotive | BMW M240i Racing | 653 | (Switzerland) Roger Stutz | 9 |
| (Germany) Team AVIA Sorg Rennsport | BMW M240i Racing | 660 | (Italy) Ivan Berets | 1 |
| (Germany) Team AVIA Sorg Rennsport | BMW M240i Racing | 660 | (United Kingdom) Brett Lidsey | 1 |
| (Germany) Team AVIA Sorg Rennsport | BMW M240i Racing | 660 | (Germany) Paul Neumayer | 5 |
| (Germany) Team AVIA Sorg Rennsport | BMW M240i Racing | 660 | (Germany) Martin Brennecke | 5 |
| (Germany) Team AVIA Sorg Rennsport | BMW M240i Racing | 660 | (Germany) David Nohles | 5 |
| (Germany) Team AVIA Sorg Rennsport | BMW M240i Racing | 660 | (Austria) Fritz Trenker | 5 |
| (Germany) Team AVIA Sorg Rennsport | BMW M240i Racing | 660 | (Italy) Ugo Vicenzi | 6, 9 |
| (Germany) Team AVIA Sorg Rennsport | BMW M240i Racing | 660 | (Italy) Alberto Carobbio | 6 |
| (Germany) Team AVIA Sorg Rennsport | BMW M240i Racing | 660 | (Finland) Hannu Karesola | 6 |
| (Germany) Team AVIA Sorg Rennsport | BMW M240i Racing | 660 | (Germany) Harald Rettich | 7 |
| (Germany) Team AVIA Sorg Rennsport | BMW M240i Racing | 660 | (France) Fabrice Reicher | 7 |
| (Germany) Team AVIA Sorg Rennsport | BMW M240i Racing | 660 | (Mexico) Hector Escamilla | 7 |
| (Germany) Team AVIA Sorg Rennsport | BMW M240i Racing | 660 | (Mexico) Luis Ramirez | 7 |
| (Germany) Team AVIA Sorg Rennsport | BMW M240i Racing | 660 | (Ukraine) Dmytro Ryzhak | 8 |
| (Germany) Team AVIA Sorg Rennsport | BMW M240i Racing | 660 | (Finland) Philip Miemois | 8 |
| (Germany) Team AVIA Sorg Rennsport | BMW M240i Racing | 660 | (United Kingdom) Matt Brookes | 8 |
| (Germany) Team AVIA Sorg Rennsport | BMW M240i Racing | 660 | (Germany) Reinhard Schmiedel | 9 |
| (Germany) Team AVIA Sorg Rennsport | BMW M240i Racing | 660 | (Germany) Hans Joachim Theiß | 9 |
| (Germany) Schnitzelalm Racing | BMW M240i Racing | 666 | (Germany) Carl-Friedrich Kolb | 1–7 |
| (Germany) Schnitzelalm Racing | BMW M240i Racing | 666 | (Germany) Christopher Brück | 1–7 |
| (Germany) Schnitzelalm Racing | BMW M240i Racing | 666 | (Germany) Michael Bräutigam | 1–3 |
| (Germany) Schnitzelalm Racing | BMW M240i Racing | 666 | (Germany) Tim Neuser | 4 |
| (Germany) Schnitzelalm Racing | BMW M240i Racing | 666 | (Germany) Tom Leswal | 5–6 |
| (Germany) Schnitzelalm Racing | BMW M240i Racing | 666 | (Germany) Kevin Wambach | 7 |
| (Germany) Schnitzelalm Racing | BMW M240i Racing | 666 | (Switzerland) Julien Apotheloz | 7 |
| (Germany) Schnitzelalm Racing | BMW M240i Racing | 666 | (Luxembourg) Bob Wilwert | 9 |
| (Germany) Schnitzelalm Racing | BMW M240i Racing | 666 | (Germany) Anton Ruf | 9 |
| (Switzerland) Hofor Racing by Bonk Motorsport | BMW M240i Racing | 700 | (Austria) Michael Fischer | 1–2, 5–9 |
| (Switzerland) Hofor Racing by Bonk Motorsport | BMW M240i Racing | 700 | (Germany) Michael Schrey | 1–2, 7–8 |
| (Switzerland) Hofor Racing by Bonk Motorsport | BMW M240i Racing | 700 | (Italy) Gabriele Piana | 1–2, 7 |
| (Switzerland) Hofor Racing by Bonk Motorsport | BMW M240i Racing | 700 | (Austria) Markus Fischer | 5–6, 8–9 |
V4
| (Germany) / Adrenalin Motorsport; (Germany) / Adrenalin Motorsport Team Alzner Automotive | BMW 325i | 1 | (Germany) Danny Brink | All |
| (Germany) / Adrenalin Motorsport; (Germany) / Adrenalin Motorsport Team Alzner Automotive | BMW 325i | 1 | (Germany) Philipp Leisen | All |
| (Germany) / Adrenalin Motorsport; (Germany) / Adrenalin Motorsport Team Alzner Automotive | BMW 325i | 1 | (Germany) Christopher Rink | All |
| (Germany) MSC Adenau e. V. im ADAC | BMW M3 CSL | 477 | (Germany) Beat Schmitz | 7 |
| (Germany) MSC Adenau e. V. im ADAC | BMW M3 CSL | 477 | (Germany) Andre Sommerberg | 7 |
| (Germany) MSC Adenau e. V. im ADAC | BMW 325i | 744 | (Germany) Marvin Kobus | 1–3 |
| (Germany) MSC Adenau e. V. im ADAC | BMW 325i | 744 | (Germany) Maximilian Kurz | 1–3 |
| (Germany) MSC Adenau e. V. im ADAC | BMW 325i | 744 | (Germany) Marc Roitzheim | 1–3 |
| (Germany) Team AVIA Sorg Rennsport | BMW 325i | 705 | (Turkey) Emir Asari | 1–5 |
| (Germany) Team AVIA Sorg Rennsport | BMW 325i | 705 | (United Kingdom) Moran Gott | 1–5 |
| | BMW 325i | 707 | (Germany) Oliver Frisse | 1–7 |
| | BMW 325i | 707 | (Germany) Florian Quante | 1–7 |
| (Germany) Dr. Stein Tveten Motorsport | BMW 325i | 716 | (Germany) Stein Tveten | 1–2 |
| (Germany) Dr. Stein Tveten Motorsport | BMW 325i | 718 | (Germany) Stein Tveten | 3 |
| (Germany) Dr. Stein Tveten Motorsport | BMW 325i | 729 | (France) Gregoire Boutonnet | 1, 3–4 |
| (Germany) Dr. Stein Tveten Motorsport | BMW 325i | 729 | (France) Laurent Laparra | 1, 3–4 |
| (Germany) Dr. Stein Tveten Motorsport | BMW 325i | 729 | (Germany) Stein Tveten | 4 |
| | BMW 325i | 717 | (Germany) Lucas Lange | 1–3, 5–7 |
| | BMW 325i | 717 | (Germany) Sascha Lott | 1–3, 5–7 |
| (Belgium) Xwift Racing Events | BMW 325i | 721 | (Belgium) Pieter Denys | 1–3 |
| (Belgium) Xwift Racing Events | BMW 325i | 721 | (Belgium) Gregory Eyckmans | 1–3 |
| (Germany) KKrämer Racing | BMW 325i | 727 | (Germany) Daniel Erens | 5–6, 8 |
| (Germany) KKrämer Racing | BMW 325i | 727 | (Germany) Maximilian Kurz | 5–6 |
| (Germany) KKrämer Racing | BMW 325i | 727 | (Germany) Markus Unkhoff | 5 |
| (Germany) KKrämer Racing | BMW 325i | 727 | (Germany) Marc Roitzheim | 6 |
| (Germany) KKrämer Racing | BMW 325i | 727 | (Germany) Danny Lehner | 7–8 |
| (Germany) KKrämer Racing | BMW 325i | 727 | (Germany) Nils Dünwald | 7–8 |
| (Germany) KKrämer Racing | BMW 325i | 727 | (Germany) Jan-Boris Schmäing | 7 |
| (Germany) KKrämer Racing | BMW 325i | 727 | (Germany) Björn Koch | 7 |
| (Germany) EPS Rennsport | BMW 325i | 728 | (Germany) Georg Kiefer | 2 |
| (Germany) EPS Rennsport | BMW 325i | 728 | (Germany) Nils Koch | 2 |
| (Germany) EPS Rennsport | BMW 325i | 728 | (Germany) Klaus-Dieter Frommer | 2 |
| | BMW 325i | 730 | (Italy) Mirco Marini | 4 |
| | BMW 325i | 730 | (Italy) Lorenzo Medori | 4 |
| | BMW 325i | 730 | (Italy) Simone Sama | 4 |
| | BMW 325i | 734 | (Germany) Manuel Dormagen | 2, 4–5, 8–9 |
| | BMW 325i | 734 | (Germany) Sven Oepen | 2, 4–5, 8–9 |
| (Germany) TM-Racing by PLUSLINE AG | BMW 325i | 737 | (Netherlands) Jos Menten | 1, 4 |
| (Germany) TM-Racing by PLUSLINE AG | BMW 325i | 737 | (Netherlands) Matheus Heezen | 1 |
| (Germany) TM-Racing by PLUSLINE AG | BMW 325i | 737 | (Finland) Markus Palttala | 1 |
| (Germany) TM-Racing by PLUSLINE AG | BMW 325i | 737 | (Germany) Jens-Oliver Bauer | 4 |
| (Germany) TM-Racing by PLUSLINE AG | BMW 325i | 737 | (Germany) Richard Gresek | 5–6 |
| (Germany) TM-Racing by PLUSLINE AG | BMW 325i | 737 | (Germany) Phillip Gresek | 5–6 |
| (Germany) TM-Racing by PLUSLINE AG | BMW 325i | 737 | (Germany) Reiner Neuffer | 7–8 |
| (Germany) TM-Racing by PLUSLINE AG | BMW 325i | 737 | (Germany) Fabio Sacchi | 7–8 |
| (Germany) TM-Racing by PLUSLINE AG | BMW 325i | 737 | (Germany) Werner Gusenbauer | 7 |
| (Germany) TM-Racing by PLUSLINE AG | BMW 325i | 747 | (Germany) Richard Gresek | 1–2, 4, 7–8 |
| (Germany) TM-Racing by PLUSLINE AG | BMW 325i | 747 | (Germany) Phillip Gresek | 1–2, 7–8 |
| (Germany) MSC Wahlscheid Keeevin Sports & Racing | BMW 325i | 740 | (Sweden) Dan Berghult | All |
| (Germany) MSC Wahlscheid Keeevin Sports & Racing | BMW 325i | 740 | (Finland) Juha Miettinen | All |
| (Germany) MSC Wahlscheid Keeevin Sports & Racing | BMW 325i | 740 | (United States) Andrew Engelmann | 1, 3–4 |
| (Germany) SFG Schönau e.V. im ADAC | BMW 325i | 741 | (Germany) Dominik Schöning | 5–9 |
| (Germany) SFG Schönau e.V. im ADAC | BMW 325i | 741 | (Germany) Roman Schiemenz | 5–9 |
| (Switzerland) Hofor Racing | BMW 325i | 745 | (Germany) Rolf Derscheid | All |
| (Switzerland) Hofor Racing | BMW 325i | 745 | (Germany) Michael Flehmer | All |
| (Switzerland) Hofor Racing | BMW 325i | 745 | (Germany) Zoran Radulovic | All |
| | BMW 325i | 749 | (Germany) Christian Scherer | 1–4, 7–8 |
| | BMW 325i | 749 | (Germany) Andreas Schmidt | 1–4, 7–8 |
| | BMW 325i | 750 | (Germany) Jürgen Huber | 2–3 |
| | BMW 325i | 750 | (Germany) Simon Sagmeister | 2–3 |
| | BMW 325i | 757 | (Netherlands) Chris Rothoff | 2–3 |
| | BMW 325i | 757 | (Germany) Lukas Pickard | 2–3 |
OPC
| (Germany) MSC Adenau | Opel Astra OPC Cup | 851 | (France) Carlos Antunes Tavares | 3, 7 |
| (Germany) MSC Adenau | Opel Astra OPC Cup | 851 | (France) Francois Wales | 3, 7 |
| (Germany) MSC Adenau | Opel Astra OPC Cup | 851 | (France) Jean Philippe Imparato | 3 |
| (Germany) MSC Adenau | Opel Astra OPC Cup | 851 | (Germany) Tobias Jung | 3 |
| (Germany) MSC Adenau | Opel Astra OPC Cup | 851 | (Germany) Tim Robertz | 7 |
| (Germany) MSC Adenau | Opel Astra OPC Cup | 851 | (France) Jean-Marc Finot | 7 |
| (Germany) LUBNER Motorsport | Opel Astra OPC Cup | 855 | (Germany) Max Günther | 3, 5–6 |
| (Germany) LUBNER Motorsport | Opel Astra OPC Cup | 855 | (Italy) Andrea Sabbatini | 3, 5–6 |
| (Germany) LUBNER Motorsport | Opel Astra OPC Cup | 855 | (Germany) Philipp Walsdorf | 3 |
| (Germany) LUBNER Motorsport | Opel Astra OPC Cup | 855 | (Germany) Jens Wulf | 5 |
| (Germany) LUBNER Motorsport | Opel Astra OPC Cup | 855 | (Switzerland) Roger Vögeli | 6 |
| | Opel Astra J | 858 | (Germany) Joachim Schulz | 5–6, 9 |
| | Opel Astra J | 858 | (Germany) Benjamin Zerfeld | 5–6, 9 |
Cup5
| (Germany) Schubert Motorsport | BMW M2 ClubSport Racing | 850 | (Germany) Torsten Schubert | 2, 9 |
| (Germany) Schubert Motorsport | BMW M2 ClubSport Racing | 850 | (Germany) Marcel Lenerz | 2, 9 |
| (Germany) Schubert Motorsport | BMW M2 ClubSport Racing | 850 | (Germany) Michael Von Zabiensky | 2 |
| (Germany) Schubert Motorsport | BMW M2 ClubSport Racing | 850 | (Germany) Stefan Von Zabiensky | 9 |
| (Germany) Schubert Motorsport | BMW M2 ClubSport Racing | 890 | (Germany) Torsten Schubert | 1–3 |
| (Germany) Schubert Motorsport | BMW M2 ClubSport Racing | 890 | (Germany) Michael Von Zabiensky | 1–3 |
| (Germany) Schubert Motorsport | BMW M2 ClubSport Racing | 890 | (Germany) Stefan Von Zabiensky | 1–2 |
| (Germany) Schubert Motorsport | BMW M2 ClubSport Racing | 890 | (Germany) Marcel Lenerz | 3 |
| (Germany) / Adrenalin Motorsport; (Germany) / Adrenalin Motorsport Team Alzner Automotive | BMW M2 ClubSport Racing | 870 | (Germany) Yannick Fübrich | All |
| (Germany) / Adrenalin Motorsport; (Germany) / Adrenalin Motorsport Team Alzner Automotive | BMW M2 ClubSport Racing | 870 | (Austria) David Griessner | All |
| (Germany) / Adrenalin Motorsport; (Germany) / Adrenalin Motorsport Team Alzner Automotive | BMW M2 ClubSport Racing | 870 | (Italy) Francesco Merlini | All |
| (Germany) / Adrenalin Motorsport; (Germany) / Adrenalin Motorsport Team Alzner Automotive | BMW M2 ClubSport Racing | 871 | (Germany) Stefan Kruse | All |
| (Germany) / Adrenalin Motorsport; (Germany) / Adrenalin Motorsport Team Alzner Automotive | BMW M2 ClubSport Racing | 871 | (Luxembourg) Charles Oakes | All |
| (Germany) / Adrenalin Motorsport; (Germany) / Adrenalin Motorsport Team Alzner Automotive | BMW M2 ClubSport Racing | 871 | (Switzerland) Guido Wirtz | All |
| (Germany) / Adrenalin Motorsport; (Germany) / Adrenalin Motorsport Team Alzner Automotive | BMW M2 ClubSport Racing | 871 | (Norway) Einar Thorsen | 1–6, 8–9 |
| (Germany) / Adrenalin Motorsport; (Germany) / Adrenalin Motorsport Team Alzner Automotive | BMW M2 ClubSport Racing | 872 | (Austria) Markus Flasch | 2–3 |
| (Germany) / Adrenalin Motorsport; (Germany) / Adrenalin Motorsport Team Alzner Automotive | BMW M2 ClubSport Racing | 872 | (Germany) Matthias Malmedie | 2–3 |
| (Germany) / Adrenalin Motorsport; (Germany) / Adrenalin Motorsport Team Alzner Automotive | BMW M2 ClubSport Racing | 872 | (Germany) Jörg Weidinger | 2–3 |
| (Germany) FK Performance Motorsport | BMW M2 ClubSport Racing | 875 | (Germany) Marc Ehret | All |
| (Germany) FK Performance Motorsport | BMW M2 ClubSport Racing | 875 | (Germany) Moritz Oberheim | All |
| (Germany) FK Performance Motorsport | BMW M2 ClubSport Racing | 875 | (Germany) Nico Otto | All |
| (Germany) MSC Wahlscheid Keeevin Sports & Racing | BMW M2 ClubSport Racing | 880 | (Germany) Klaus Faßbender | 1–4 |
| (Germany) MSC Wahlscheid Keeevin Sports & Racing | BMW M2 ClubSport Racing | 880 | (Germany) Lars Harbeck | 1–4 |
| (Germany) MSC Wahlscheid Keeevin Sports & Racing | BMW M2 ClubSport Racing | 880 | (Germany) Sven Markert | 1–4 |
| (Germany) Hangar-Zero Racing | BMW M2 ClubSport Racing | 881 | (Poland) Kuba Giermaziak | 1–3 |
| (Germany) Hangar-Zero Racing | BMW M2 ClubSport Racing | 881 | (Germany) Frank Kechele | 1–3 |
| | BMW M2 ClubSport Racing | 883 | (Germany) Tobias Vazquez | All |
| | BMW M2 ClubSport Racing | 883 | (Germany) Michael Tischner | 7 |
| (Germany) Purple Dot Racing with Walkenhorst | BMW M2 ClubSport Racing | 888 | (Germany) Davide Dehren | All |
| (Germany) Purple Dot Racing with Walkenhorst | BMW M2 ClubSport Racing | 888 | (Germany) Florian Weber | All |
| (Germany) Purple Dot Racing with Walkenhorst | BMW M2 ClubSport Racing | 888 | (United Kingdom) Ben Tuck | 2 |
| (Germany) Purple Dot Racing with Walkenhorst | BMW M2 ClubSport Racing | 888 | (United Kingdom) Will Tregurtha | 3, 5–6 |
| (Germany) Purple Dot Racing with Walkenhorst | BMW M2 ClubSport Racing | 888 | (Germany) Dennis Fetzer | 4 |
| (Germany) Purple Dot Racing with Walkenhorst | BMW M2 ClubSport Racing | 888 | (Germany) Thomas D. Hetzer | 7–8 |
| (Germany) Purple Dot Racing with Walkenhorst | BMW M2 ClubSport Racing | 888 | (United Kingdom) Matthew Greenwood | 9 |
| (Germany) Purple Dot Racing with Walkenhorst | BMW M2 ClubSport Racing | 889 | (United Kingdom) Matthew Greenwood | 1–4, 7–8 |
| (Germany) Purple Dot Racing with Walkenhorst | BMW M2 ClubSport Racing | 889 | (United Kingdom) Will Tregurtha | 1–2, 4, 8 |
| (Germany) Purple Dot Racing with Walkenhorst | BMW M2 ClubSport Racing | 889 | (United Kingdom) Seb Morris | 2 |
| (Germany) Purple Dot Racing with Walkenhorst | BMW M2 ClubSport Racing | 889 | (France) Thomas Neubauer | 3 |
| (Germany) Purple Dot Racing with Walkenhorst | BMW M2 ClubSport Racing | 889 | (United Kingdom) Tom Wood | 3 |
| (Germany) Purple Dot Racing with Walkenhorst | BMW M2 ClubSport Racing | 889 | (Denmark) Nicolai Kjærgaard | 4, 7 |
| (Germany) Purple Dot Racing with Walkenhorst | BMW M2 ClubSport Racing | 889 | (United Kingdom) Steven Liquorish | 7 |
| (Germany) Purple Dot Racing with Walkenhorst | BMW M2 ClubSport Racing | 889 | (United Kingdom) Jordan Witt | 8 |
| (Switzerland) Hofor Racing by Bonk Motorsport | BMW M2 ClubSport Racing | 891 | (Germany) Rainer Partl | 1, 6 |
| (Switzerland) Hofor Racing by Bonk Motorsport | BMW M2 ClubSport Racing | 891 | (Germany) Michael Bonk | 1 |
| (Switzerland) Hofor Racing by Bonk Motorsport | BMW M2 ClubSport Racing | 891 | (Germany) Volker Piepmeyer | 1 |
| (Switzerland) Hofor Racing by Bonk Motorsport | BMW M2 ClubSport Racing | 891 | (Germany) Max Partl | 6–7 |
| (Switzerland) Hofor Racing by Bonk Motorsport | BMW M2 ClubSport Racing | 891 | (Germany) Felix Partl | 7 |
| (Switzerland) Hofor Racing by Bonk Motorsport | BMW M2 ClubSport Racing | 891 | (Germany) Michael Schrey | 7 |
| (Germany) Yeeti Racing | BMW M2 ClubSport Racing | 898 | (Denmark) Thomas Krebs | 8–9 |
| (Germany) Yeeti Racing | BMW M2 ClubSport Racing | 898 | (Italy) Domenico Solombrino | 8–9 |
| (Germany) Yeeti Racing | BMW M2 ClubSport Racing | 898 | (United States) Sabré Cook | 8 |
| (Germany) Yeeti Racing | BMW M2 ClubSport Racing | 898 | (Denmark) Christina Nielsen | 9 |
| (Germany) Yeeti Racing | BMW M2 ClubSport Racing | 898 | (Germany) Phil Hill | 9 |
| (Germany) LifeCar Racing | BMW M2 ClubSport Racing | 899 | (Germany) Thomas Leyherr | All |
| (Germany) LifeCar Racing | BMW M2 ClubSport Racing | 899 | (Germany) Lars Peucker | All |
Cup X
| (Germany) Teichmann Racing GT4 | KTM X-Bow GT4 | 94 | (Germany) Felix von der Laden | 3, 5–6 |
| (Germany) Teichmann Racing GT4 | KTM X-Bow GT4 | 94 | (Germany) Tamino Bergmeier | 3, 5–6 |
| (Germany) Teichmann Racing GT4 | KTM X-Bow GT4 | 94 | (Germany) Tim Sandtler | 3 |
| (Germany) Teichmann Racing GT4 | KTM X-Bow GT4 | 94 | (Netherlands) Jos Menten | 5–6 |
| (Germany) Teichmann Racing GT4 | KTM X-Bow GT4 | 912 | (Austria) Karl Heinz Teichmann | 1 |
| (Germany) Teichmann Racing GT4 | KTM X-Bow GT4 | 912 | (Austria) Florian Janits | 4 |
| (Germany) Teichmann Racing GT4 | KTM X-Bow GT4 | 912 | (Norway) Mads Siljehaug | 4 |
| (Germany) Teichmann Racing GT4 | KTM X-Bow GT4 | 912 | (Germany) Tamino Bergmeier | 4 |
| (Germany) Teichmann Racing GT4 | KTM X-Bow GT4 | 927 | (Germany) Stephen Brodmerkel | All |
| (Germany) Teichmann Racing GT4 | KTM X-Bow GT4 | 927 | (Germany) Michael Mönch | 1–7 |
| (Germany) Teichmann Racing GT4 | KTM X-Bow GT4 | 927 | (Germany) Ercan Kara Osman | 1, 3 |
| (Germany) Teichmann Racing GT4 | KTM X-Bow GT4 | 927 | (Austria) Karl Heinz Teichmann | 2, 5, 7–9 |
| (Germany) Teichmann Racing GT4 | KTM X-Bow GT4 | 927 | (Austria) Laura Kraihamer | 4, 6 |
| (Germany) Teichmann Racing GT4 | KTM X-Bow GT4 | 927 | (Germany) Tamino Bergmeier | 7–9 |
| (Germany) Teichmann Racing GT4 | KTM X-Bow GT4 | 929 | (Germany) Tamino Bergmeier | 1–2 |
| (Germany) Teichmann Racing GT4 | KTM X-Bow GT4 | 929 | (Germany) Felix von der Laden | 1–2 |
| (Germany) Teichmann Racing GT4 | KTM X-Bow GT4 | 929 | (Germany) Tim Sandtler | 1 |
| (Germany) Teichmann Racing GT4 | KTM X-Bow GT4 | 929 | (Norway) Mads Siljehaug | 2 |
| (Germany) Teichmann Racing GT4 | KTM X-Bow GT4 | 930 | (Germany) Georg Griesemann | All |
| (Germany) Teichmann Racing GT4 | KTM X-Bow GT4 | 930 | (Germany) Maik Rönnefarth | All |
| (Germany) Teichmann Racing GT4 | KTM X-Bow GT4 | 930 | (Germany) Yves Volte | All |
| (Germany) Teichmann Racing GT4 | KTM X-Bow GT4 | 930 | (Germany) Tim Sandtler | 7 |
| (Germany) Teichmann Racing GTX | KTM X-Bow GTX Concept | 910 | (Luxembourg) Daniel Bohr | 1–2, 8 |
| (Germany) Teichmann Racing GTX | KTM X-Bow GTX Concept | 910 | (Germany) Timo Moelig | 1–2, 8 |
| (Germany) Teichmann Racing GTX | KTM X-Bow GTX Concept | 910 | (Austria) Reinhard Kofler | 2, 8 |
| (Germany) Teichmann Racing GTX | KTM X-Bow GTX Concept | 910 | (Switzerland) Manuel Amweg | 9 |
| (Germany) Teichmann Racing GTX | KTM X-Bow GTX Concept | 910 | (Germany) Florian Wolf | 9 |
| (Germany) Teichmann Racing GTX | KTM X-Bow GTX Concept | 910 | (Germany) Felix von der Laden | 9 |
| (Germany) Teichmann Racing GTX | KTM X-Bow GTX Concept | 913 | (Luxembourg) Daniel Bohr | 3 |
| (Germany) Teichmann Racing GTX | KTM X-Bow GTX Concept | 913 | (Germany) Timo Moelig | 3 |
| (Germany) Teichmann Racing GTX | KTM X-Bow GTX Concept | 913 | (Austria) Reinhard Kofler | 3 |
| (Germany) Teichmann Racing GTX | KTM X-Bow GTX Concept | 920 | (Germany) Hendrik Still | 1, 3–4, 8–9 |
| (Germany) Teichmann Racing GTX | KTM X-Bow GTX Concept | 920 | (Germany) Peter Terting | 1 |
| (Germany) Teichmann Racing GTX | KTM X-Bow GTX Concept | 920 | (Austria) Laura Kraihamer | 1 |
| (Germany) Teichmann Racing GTX | KTM X-Bow GTX Concept | 920 | (Austria) Constantin Schöll | 3–4, 8–9 |
| (Germany) Teichmann Racing GTX | KTM X-Bow GTX Concept | 920 | (Austria) Max Hofer | 3 |
| (Germany) Teichmann Racing GTX | KTM X-Bow GTX Concept | 920 | (Austria) Reinhard Kofler | 4–7 |
| (Germany) Teichmann Racing GTX | KTM X-Bow GTX Concept | 920 | (Luxembourg) Daniel Bohr | 5–7 |
| (Germany) Teichmann Racing GTX | KTM X-Bow GTX Concept | 920 | (Germany) Timo Moelig | 5–7 |
| (Germany) Teichmann Racing GTX | KTM X-Bow GTX Concept | 920 | (Germany) Felix von der Laden | 7 |
| (Germany) Teichmann Racing GTX | KTM X-Bow GTX Concept | 920 | (Netherlands) Jeroen Bleekemolen | 8 |
| (Germany) Teichmann Racing GTX | KTM X-Bow GTX Concept | 920 | (Germany) Florian Naumann | 9 |
| (Germany) Team mcchip-dkr | KTM X-Bow GTX Concept | 921 | (Germany) Heiko Hammel | 1–2 |
| (Germany) Team mcchip-dkr | KTM X-Bow GTX Concept | 921 | (Germany) Tim Heinemann | 1–2 |
| (Germany) Team mcchip-dkr | KTM X-Bow GTX Concept | 921 | (Germany) 'Dieter Schmidtmann' | 1–2 |
| (Austria) KTM Sportscar | KTM X-Bow GTX Concept | 922 | (Austria) Reinhard Kofler | 1–2 |
| (Austria) KTM Sportscar | KTM X-Bow GTX Concept | 922 | (Germany) Christian Menzel | 1–2 |
| (Austria) True Racing | KTM X-Bow GTX Concept | 922 | (Germany) Ferdinand Stuck | 3 |
| (Austria) True Racing | KTM X-Bow GTX Concept | 922 | (Germany) Johannes Stuck | 3 |
| (Austria) True Racing | KTM X-Bow GTX Concept | 922 | (Austria) Reinhard Kofler | 3 |
| (Austria) True Racing | KTM X-Bow GTX Concept | 923 | (Germany) Jens Dralle | 3 |
| (Austria) True Racing | KTM X-Bow GTX Concept | 923 | (Germany) Markus Oestreich | 3 |
Cup 3
| (Germany) Schmickler Performance powered by Ravenol | Porsche 718 Cayman GT4 Clubsport | 75 | (Germany) Horst Baumann | All |
| (Germany) Schmickler Performance powered by Ravenol | Porsche 718 Cayman GT4 Clubsport | 75 | (Germany) Kai Riemer | All |
| (Germany) Schmickler Performance powered by Ravenol | Porsche 718 Cayman GT4 Clubsport | 75 | (Germany) Moritz Wiskirchen | 7–8 |
| (Germany) Schmickler Performance powered by Ravenol | Porsche 718 Cayman GT4 Clubsport | 75 | (Switzerland) Ivan Jacoma | 7 |
| (Germany) Schmickler Performance powered by Ravenol | Porsche 718 Cayman GT4 Clubsport | 975 | (Germany) Helmut Baumann | 7 |
| (Germany) Schmickler Performance powered by Ravenol | Porsche 718 Cayman GT4 Clubsport | 975 | (Germany) Klaus Niesen | 7 |
| (Germany) Schmickler Performance powered by Ravenol | Porsche 718 Cayman GT4 Clubsport | 975 | (Germany) Stefan Schmickler | 7 |
| (Germany) JS Competition | Porsche Cayman GT4 Clubsport MR | 940 | (Germany) Heinz Dolfen | 1–5, 7–9 |
| (Germany) JS Competition | Porsche Cayman GT4 Clubsport MR | 940 | (Germany) John Lee Schambony | 1–5, 7–9 |
| (Germany) JS Competition | Porsche Cayman GT4 Clubsport MR | 940 | (Germany) Kim Berwanger | 3 |
| (Germany) 9und11 Racing Team | Porsche Cayman GT4 Clubsport MR | 944 | (Germany) Niklas Oehme | 7–9 |
| (Germany) 9und11 Racing Team | Porsche Cayman GT4 Clubsport MR | 944 | (Germany) Leonard Oehme | 7–9 |
| (Germany) 9und11 Racing Team | Porsche Cayman GT4 Clubsport MR | 944 | (Germany) Ralf Oehme | 7 |
| (Germany) Team AVIA Sorg Rennsport | Porsche 718 Cayman GT4 Clubsport | 949 | (Germany) Stefan Beyer | 1–7, 9 |
| (Germany) Team AVIA Sorg Rennsport | Porsche 718 Cayman GT4 Clubsport | 949 | (Germany) Heiko Eichenberg | 1–7, 9 |
| (Germany) Team AVIA Sorg Rennsport | Porsche 718 Cayman GT4 Clubsport | 949 | (Germany) Torsten Kratz | 1, 3–4, 6–7, 9 |
| (Germany) Black Falcon Team TEXTAR | Porsche 718 Cayman GT4 Clubsport | 950 | (Germany) 'Iceman' | 4–7 |
| (Germany) Black Falcon Team TEXTAR | Porsche 718 Cayman GT4 Clubsport | 950 | (Germany) Martin Meenen | 4–7 |
| (Germany) Black Falcon Team TEXTAR | Porsche 718 Cayman GT4 Clubsport | 950 | (Germany) Carsten Palluth | 4 |
| (Germany) Black Falcon Team TEXTAR | Porsche 718 Cayman GT4 Clubsport | 950 | (Russia) Vasilii Selivanov | 7 |
| (Germany) Black Falcon Team TEXTAR | Porsche Cayman GT4 Clubsport MR | 970 | (Russia) Alexander Akimenkov | 8 |
| (Germany) Black Falcon Team TEXTAR | Porsche Cayman GT4 Clubsport MR | 970 | (Germany) 'Iceman' | 8 |
| (Germany) Black Falcon Team TEXTAR | Porsche Cayman GT4 Clubsport MR | 970 | (Russia) Vasilii Selivanov | 8 |
| (Germany) EPS Rennsport | Porsche 718 Cayman GT4 Clubsport | 951 | (Germany) Mark Wallenwein | 2–3 |
| (Germany) EPS Rennsport | Porsche 718 Cayman GT4 Clubsport | 951 | (Germany) Henning Deuster | 2–3 |
| (Germany) EPS Rennsport | Porsche 718 Cayman GT4 Clubsport | 951 | (Germany) Christian Rosen | 2–3 |
| (Germany) Team Mathol Racing e.V. | Porsche Cayman GT4 Clubsport MR | 954 | (Germany) Henning Cramer | 5–7 |
| (Germany) Team Mathol Racing e.V. | Porsche Cayman GT4 Clubsport MR | 954 | (United States) Andreas Gabler | 5–7 |
| (Germany) Team Mathol Racing e.V. | Porsche 718 Cayman GT4 Clubsport | 955 | (Germany) 'Montana' | All |
| (Germany) Team Mathol Racing e.V. | Porsche 718 Cayman GT4 Clubsport | 955 | (Switzerland) Rüdiger Schicht | All |
| (Germany) Team Mathol Racing e.V. | Porsche 718 Cayman GT4 Clubsport | 955 | (Germany) Arne Hoffmeister | 1, 3–7, 9 |
| (Germany) Team Mathol Racing e.V. | Porsche 718 Cayman GT4 Clubsport | 955 | (Germany) Alex Fielenbach | 2, 8 |
| (Germany) rent2drive-FAMILIA-racing | Porsche Cayman GT4 Clubsport MR | 956 | (Germany) Moritz Wiskirchen | 2–3 |
| (Germany) rent2drive-FAMILIA-racing | Porsche Cayman GT4 Clubsport MR | 956 | (Germany) Karl Pflanz | 2 |
| (Germany) rent2drive-FAMILIA-racing | Porsche Cayman GT4 Clubsport MR | 956 | (Austria) Constantin Schöll | 2 |
| (Germany) rent2drive-FAMILIA-racing | Porsche Cayman GT4 Clubsport MR | 956 | (Switzerland) Miklas Born | 3 |
| (Germany) rent2drive-FAMILIA-racing | Porsche Cayman GT4 Clubsport MR | 956 | (Germany) Phil Dörr | 3 |
| (Germany) rent2drive-FAMILIA-racing | Porsche Cayman GT4 Clubsport MR | 956 | (Germany) David Ackermann | 8 |
| (Germany) rent2drive-FAMILIA-racing | Porsche Cayman GT4 Clubsport MR | 956 | (Germany) Stefan Müller | 8 |
| (Germany) rent2drive-FAMILIA-racing | Porsche Cayman GT4 Clubsport MR | 956 | (Germany) Jörg Wiskirchen | 8 |
| (Germany) W&S Motorsport | Porsche 718 Cayman GT4 Clubsport | 959 | (Germany) Niklas Steinhaus | All |
| (Germany) W&S Motorsport | Porsche 718 Cayman GT4 Clubsport | 959 | (Germany) Jürgen Vöhringer | All |
| (Germany) W&S Motorsport | Porsche 718 Cayman GT4 Clubsport | 959 | (Luxembourg) Sébastien Carcone | 2–3 |
| (Germany) W&S Motorsport | Porsche 718 Cayman GT4 Clubsport | 959 | (France) Sébastian Perrot | 7–9 |
| (Germany) W&S Motorsport | Porsche 718 Cayman GT4 Clubsport | 959 | (Germany) Walter Schweikart | 7 |
| (Germany) W&S Motorsport | Porsche 718 Cayman GT4 Clubsport | 960 | (Germany) Daniel Blickle | All |
| (Germany) W&S Motorsport | Porsche 718 Cayman GT4 Clubsport | 960 | (Germany) Max Kronberg | All |
| (Germany) W&S Motorsport | Porsche 718 Cayman GT4 Clubsport | 960 | (Germany) Tim Scheerbarth | All |
| (Germany) Frikadelli Racing Team | Porsche 718 Cayman GT4 Clubsport | 962 | (Germany) 'JULES' | 1–7 |
| (Germany) Frikadelli Racing Team | Porsche 718 Cayman GT4 Clubsport | 962 | (Germany) Hendrik von Danwitz | 1–7 |
| (Germany) Aimpoint Racing | Porsche 718 Cayman GT4 Clubsport | 964 | (Germany) Axel Friedhoff | 1–5, 7–9 |
| (Germany) Aimpoint Racing | Porsche 718 Cayman GT4 Clubsport | 964 | (Germany) Max Friedhoff | 1–5, 7–9 |
| (Germany) Aimpoint Racing | Porsche 718 Cayman GT4 Clubsport | 964 | (Germany) Moritz Wiskirchen | 9 |
| (Germany) KKrämer Racing | Porsche 718 Cayman GT4 Clubsport | 966 | (Germany) Afschin Fatemi | 7–8 |
| (Germany) KKrämer Racing | Porsche 718 Cayman GT4 Clubsport | 966 | (Germany) Steffen Höber | 7 |
| (Germany) KKrämer Racing | Porsche 718 Cayman GT4 Clubsport | 966 | (United States) Jean-Francois Brunot | 7 |
| (Germany) KKrämer Racing | Porsche 718 Cayman GT4 Clubsport | 966 | (Germany) Marc Roitzheim | 7 |
| (Germany) KKrämer Racing | Porsche 718 Cayman GT4 Clubsport | 966 | (Germany) Karsten Krämer | 8 |
| (Germany) KKrämer Racing | Porsche 718 Cayman GT4 Clubsport | 966 | (Russia) Alexey Veremenko | 8 |
| (Germany) KKrämer Racing | Porsche 718 Cayman GT4 Clubsport | 977 | (Germany) Karsten Krämer | All |
| (Germany) KKrämer Racing | Porsche 718 Cayman GT4 Clubsport | 977 | (Russia) Alexey Veremenko | All |
| (Germany) KKrämer Racing | Porsche 718 Cayman GT4 Clubsport | 977 | (Germany) Heiko Tönges | 1–2 |
| (Germany) KKrämer Racing | Porsche 718 Cayman GT4 Clubsport | 977 | (Germany) Henning Cramer | 3 |
| (Germany) KKrämer Racing | Porsche 718 Cayman GT4 Clubsport | 977 | (Germany) Cristopher Bruck | 4, 7–9 |
| (Germany) KKrämer Racing | Porsche 718 Cayman GT4 Clubsport | 978 | (Ukraine) Yevgen Sokolovskiy | 1–3, 7 |
| (Germany) KKrämer Racing | Porsche 718 Cayman GT4 Clubsport | 978 | (Germany) Danny Lehner | 1–2 |
| (Germany) KKrämer Racing | Porsche 718 Cayman GT4 Clubsport | 978 | (Germany) Karsten Krämer | 1, 5 |
| (Germany) KKrämer Racing | Porsche 718 Cayman GT4 Clubsport | 978 | (Germany) Danny Hirschauer | 2, 6–7 |
| (Germany) KKrämer Racing | Porsche 718 Cayman GT4 Clubsport | 978 | (Germany) Steffen Höber | 3–4 |
| (Germany) KKrämer Racing | Porsche 718 Cayman GT4 Clubsport | 978 | (Germany) Afschin Fatemi | 3 |
| (Germany) KKrämer Racing | Porsche 718 Cayman GT4 Clubsport | 978 | (Germany) Marc Roitzheim | 4–5 |
| (Germany) KKrämer Racing | Porsche 718 Cayman GT4 Clubsport | 978 | (Germany) Maximillian Kurz | 4 |
| (Germany) KKrämer Racing | Porsche 718 Cayman GT4 Clubsport | 978 | (United States) Jean-Francois Brunot | 5–6 |
| (Germany) KKrämer Racing | Porsche 718 Cayman GT4 Clubsport | 978 | (Germany) Holger Schnautz | 6–8 |
| (Germany) KKrämer Racing | Porsche 718 Cayman GT4 Clubsport | 978 | (Germany) Jan Ullrich | 7–9 |
| (Germany) KKrämer Racing | Porsche 718 Cayman GT4 Clubsport | 978 | (Germany) Björn Koch | 8 |
| (Germany) KKrämer Racing | Porsche 718 Cayman GT4 Clubsport | 978 | (Germany) Moritz Oehme | 9 |
| (Germany) KKrämer Racing | Porsche 718 Cayman GT4 Clubsport | 978 | (Germany) Nils Dünwald | 9 |
| (Germany) KKrämer Racing | Porsche 718 Cayman GT4 Clubsport | 978 | (Germany) Alexander Kroker | 9 |
| (Belgium) Mühlner Motorsport | Porsche 718 Cayman GT4 Clubsport | 969 | (Germany) Thorsten Jung | All |
| (Belgium) Mühlner Motorsport | Porsche 718 Cayman GT4 Clubsport | 969 | (Norway) Oskar Sandberg | All |
| (Belgium) Mühlner Motorsport | Porsche 718 Cayman GT4 Clubsport | 969 | (Germany) Sebastian Von Gartzen | 4 |
| (Belgium) Mühlner Motorsport | Porsche 718 Cayman GT4 Clubsport | 969 | (Germany) Andreas Patzelt | 7 |
| (Belgium) Mühlner Motorsport | Porsche 718 Cayman GT4 Clubsport | 969 | (Germany) Torleif Nytroen | 9 |
| (Belgium) Mühlner Motorsport | Porsche 718 Cayman GT4 Clubsport | 979 | (Germany) Marcel Hoppe | All |
| (Belgium) Mühlner Motorsport | Porsche 718 Cayman GT4 Clubsport | 979 | (Germany) Michael Rebhan | 1–3 |
| (Belgium) Mühlner Motorsport | Porsche 718 Cayman GT4 Clubsport | 979 | (Germany) Sebastian Von Gartzen | 2–3 |
| (Belgium) Mühlner Motorsport | Porsche 718 Cayman GT4 Clubsport | 979 | (Germany) Andreas Patzelt | 4 |
| (Belgium) Mühlner Motorsport | Porsche 718 Cayman GT4 Clubsport | 979 | (Germany) Thorsten Wolter | 4–9 |
| (Belgium) Mühlner Motorsport | Porsche 718 Cayman GT4 Clubsport | 979 | (Germany) Philip Hamprecht | 5–6 |
| (Belgium) Mühlner Motorsport | Porsche 718 Cayman GT4 Clubsport | 979 | (Belgium) Aris Balanian | 7 |
| (Belgium) Mühlner Motorsport | Porsche 718 Cayman GT4 Clubsport | 979 | (Germany) Nick Salewsky | 8–9 |
| (Belgium) Mühlner Motorsport | Porsche Cayman GT4 Clubsport MR | 980 | (Belgium) Aris Balanian | 2, 4 |
| (Belgium) Mühlner Motorsport | Porsche Cayman GT4 Clubsport MR | 980 | (Germany) Philip Hamprecht | 2, 4 |
| (Belgium) Mühlner Motorsport | Porsche Cayman GT4 Clubsport MR | 980 | (Germany) Nick Salewsky | 5–6 |
| (Belgium) Mühlner Motorsport | Porsche Cayman GT4 Clubsport MR | 980 | (Switzerland) Michelangelo Comazzi | 5–6 |
| (Germany) / FK Performance Motorsport (Note: Cars No. 976 and No.981 entered as FK Performance Motorsport, Cars No.982 and No.983 entered at Round 1 as FK Performance Motorsport and at Round 2 as G-Tech Competition.); (Germany) / G-Tech Competition | Porsche 718 Cayman GT4 Clubsport | 976 | (Germany) Ben Bünnagel | All |
| (Germany) / FK Performance Motorsport; (Germany) / G-Tech Competition | Porsche 718 Cayman GT4 Clubsport | 976 | (Germany) Nico Otto | All |
| (Germany) / FK Performance Motorsport; (Germany) / G-Tech Competition | Porsche 718 Cayman GT4 Clubsport | 976 | (Germany) Nick Wüstenhagen | All |
| (Germany) / FK Performance Motorsport; (Germany) / G-Tech Competition | Porsche 718 Cayman GT4 Clubsport | 982 | (Germany) Fabio Grosse | 1–4, 7, 9 |
| (Germany) / FK Performance Motorsport; (Germany) / G-Tech Competition | Porsche 718 Cayman GT4 Clubsport | 982 | (Germany) Thorsten Wolter | 1–3 |
| (Germany) / FK Performance Motorsport; (Germany) / G-Tech Competition | Porsche 718 Cayman GT4 Clubsport | 982 | (Switzerland) Patrik Grütter | 1, 3–4, 7, 9 |
| (Germany) / FK Performance Motorsport; (Germany) / G-Tech Competition | Porsche 718 Cayman GT4 Clubsport | 982 | (Netherlands) Jan Jaap van Roon | 4 |
| (Germany) / FK Performance Motorsport; (Germany) / G-Tech Competition | Porsche 718 Cayman GT4 Clubsport | 983 | (Switzerland) Patrik Grütter | 1–2 |
| (Germany) / FK Performance Motorsport; (Germany) / G-Tech Competition | Porsche Cayman GT4 Clubsport MR | 981 | (Germany) Fabio Grosse | 1–3 |
| (Germany) / FK Performance Motorsport; (Germany) / G-Tech Competition | Porsche Cayman GT4 Clubsport MR | 981 | (Netherlands) Jan Jaap van Roon | 1–3 |
| (Germany) / FK Performance Motorsport; (Germany) / G-Tech Competition | Porsche Cayman GT4 Clubsport MR | 981 | (Germany) Jan Ullrich | 1–2 |
| (Germany) / FK Performance Motorsport; (Germany) / G-Tech Competition | Porsche Cayman GT4 Clubsport MR | 981 | (Switzerland) Patrik Grütter | 3 |
| (Germany) / FK Performance Motorsport; (Germany) / G-Tech Competition | Porsche Cayman GT4 Clubsport MR | 983 | (Netherlands) Jan Jaap van Roon | 5–8 |
| (Germany) / FK Performance Motorsport; (Germany) / G-Tech Competition | Porsche Cayman GT4 Clubsport MR | 983 | (Switzerland) Patrik Grütter | 5–8 |
| (Germany) / FK Performance Motorsport; (Germany) / G-Tech Competition | Porsche Cayman GT4 Clubsport MR | 983 | (Germany) Fabio Grosse | 5–8 |
| (Germany) / FK Performance Motorsport; (Germany) / G-Tech Competition | Porsche Cayman GT4 Clubsport MR | 983 | (Netherlands) Tom Coronel | 7 |
EntryLists:

== Results ==
Results indicates overall winner only in the whole race.

| Rnd | Circuit | Pole position | Overall winners |
|---|---|---|---|
| 1 | (Germany) Nürburgring Nordschleife | Race cancelled due to snowfall | |
| 2 | (Germany) Nürburgring Nordschleife | (Germany) No. 31 Frikadelli Racing Team | (Germany) No. 911 Manthey Racing |
| 2 | (Germany) Nürburgring Nordschleife | (France) Frédéric Makowiecki (Norway) Dennis Olsen | (Denmark) Michael Christensen (France) Kévin Estre (Germany) Lars Kern |
| 3 | (Germany) Nürburgring Nordschleife | (Germany) No. 20 Schubert Motorsport | (Germany) No. 30 Frikadelli Racing Team |
| 3 | (Germany) Nürburgring Nordschleife | (Germany) Jens Klingmann (Finland) Jesse Krohn (United Kingdom) Alexander Sims (Netherlands) Stef Dusseldorp | (New Zealand) Earl Bamber (France) Mathieu Jaminet |
| 4 | (Germany) Nürburgring Nordschleife | (Germany) No. 24 Lionspeed by Car Collection Motorsport | (Germany) No. 44 BMW Team RMG |
| 4 | (Germany) Nürburgring Nordschleife | (Italy) Lorenzo Rocco di Torrepadula (Germany) Patrick Kolb (Switzerland) Patric Niederhauser (Netherlands) Milan Dontje | (United States) Neil Verhagen (United Kingdom) Daniel Harper (Germany) Max Hesse |
| 5 | (Germany) Nürburgring Nordschleife | (Austria) No. 7 Konrad Motorsport | (Germany) No. 44 BMW Junior Team |
| 5 | (Germany) Nürburgring Nordschleife | (Italy) Michele Di Martino (Poland) Kuba Giermaziak | (United Kingdom) Daniel Harper (Germany) Max Hesse (United States) Neil Verhagen |
| 6 | (Germany) Nürburgring Nordschleife | (Germany) No. 34 Walkenhorst Motorsport | (Germany) No. 34 Walkenhorst Motorsport |
| 6 | (Germany) Nürburgring Nordschleife | (Norway) Christian Krognes (United Kingdom) David Pittard (United Kingdom) Ben Tuck | (Norway) Christian Krognes (United Kingdom) David Pittard (United Kingdom) Ben Tuck |
| 7 | (Germany) Nürburgring Nordschleife | (Germany) No. 4 Falken Motorsports | (Germany) No. 911 Manthey Racing |
| 7 | (Germany) Nürburgring Nordschleife | (Austria) Martin Ragginger (Belgium) Alessio Picariello | (Denmark) Michael Christensen (France) Kévin Estre |
| 8 | (Germany) Nürburgring Nordschleife | (Germany) No. 30 Frikadelli Racing Team | (United Kingdom) No. 21 Aston Martin Racing (Note: One-off entry with the car Aston Martin Vantage GT3, aiming the 2022 Nürburgring 24 Hours. A prerequisite for an entry in the Nürburgring 24 Hours is a full-time entry in the NLS.) |
| 8 | (Germany) Nürburgring Nordschleife | (Germany) Klaus Abbelen (France) Julien Andlauer | (Denmark) Nicki Thiim (Belgium) Maxime Martin |
| 9 | (Germany) Nürburgring Nordschleife | (Austria) No. 7 Konrad Motorsport | (Germany) No. 5 Phoenix Racing |
| 9 | (Germany) Nürburgring Nordschleife | (Zimbabwe) Axcil Jefferies (South Africa) Jordan Pepper | (Germany) Vincent Kolb (Germany) Frank Stippler |

== See also ==
- 2021 24 Hours of Nürburgring

== Bibliography ==
- Tim Upietz, Patrik Koziolek & Eugen Shkolnikov (5 December 2021). Nürburgring Langstrecken-Serie 2021. Gruppe C Motorsport Verlag. ISBN 978-3-948501-14-3.
