= 2022 Nürburgring Langstrecken-Serie =

45th season of the German endurance series

The 2022 Nürburgring Langstrecken-Serie is the 45th season of the German endurance series (formerly VLN) run at the Nürburgring Nordschleife, and third run as the Nürburgring Langstrecken-Serie (NLS). The season began on 26 March and ended on 5 November.

Daniel Zils, Oskar Sandberg and Sindre Setsaas won the drivers championship in a BMW 330i, driving for Adrenalin Motorsport. Scherer Sport Team Phoenix (Audi R8 LMS GT3 EVO II) won the overall teams championship (NLS Speed Trophy).

== Calendar ==
Rnd.	Race	Length	Circuit	Date
1	67. ADAC Westfalenfahrt	4 hours	(Germany) Nürburgring Nordschleife	26 March
2	53. Adenauer ADAC Rundstrecken-Trophy	4 hours	(Germany) Nürburgring Nordschleife	23 April
3	45. RCM DMV Grenzlandrennen	4 hours	(Germany) Nürburgring Nordschleife	25 June
4	ROWE 6 Stunden ADAC Ruhr-Pokal-Rennen	6 hours	(Germany) Nürburgring Nordschleife	9 July
5	12 Stunden Nürburgring	12 hours	(Germany) Nürburgring Nordschleife	9-11 September
6	54. ADAC Barbarossapreis	4 hours	(Germany) Nürburgring Nordschleife	8 October
7	PAGID Racing 46. DMV Münsterlandpokal	4 hours	(Germany) Nürburgring Nordschleife	22 October
8	46. NIMEX DMV 4-Stunden-Rennen	4 hours	(Germany) Nürburgring Nordschleife	5 November

== Classes ==
Entries are split into multiple different classes. Current classes are:

	Class
NLS specials
SP2	Purpose-built racecars with an engine capacity between 1400 and 1749 cc.
SP2T	Purpose-built racecars with a turbocharged-engine capacity between 1400 and 1749 cc and a turbocharger.
SP3	Purpose-built racecars with an engine capacity between 1750 and 1999 cc.
SP3T	Purpose-built racecars with a turbocharged-engine capacity between 1750 and 1999 cc and a turbocharger.
SP4	Purpose-built racecars with an engine capacity between 2000 and 2499 cc.
SP4T	Purpose-built racecars with a turbocharged-engine capacity between 2000 and 2499 cc and a turbocharger.
SP5	Purpose-built racecars with an engine capacity between 2500 and 2999 cc.
SP6	Purpose-built racecars with an engine capacity between 3000 and 3499 cc.
SP7	Purpose-built racecars with an engine capacity between 3500 and 3999 cc.
SP8	Purpose-built racecars with an engine capacity over 4000 cc.
SP8T	Purpose-built racecars with a turbocharged-engine capacity between 2600 and 4000 cc.
SP9	For FIA-homologated Group GT3 cars. GT3 sub-classes based on driver ranking system maintained by the FIA.
SP9 Pro, SP9 Pro-Am & SP9 Am	For FIA-homologated Group GT3 cars. GT3 sub-classes based on driver ranking system maintained by the FIA.
SP10	For FIA and SRO-homologated Group GT4 cars.
SP-Pro	Prototype racecars with an engine capacity over 3000 cc.
SPX	'Special vehicles' which do not fit into any other class.
AT(-G)	Vehicles using alternative fuel sources (e.g. electric, LPG, hydrogen, etc.)
TCR touring cars
TCR	FIA-homologated TCR Touring Cars. TCR sub-classes based on driver ranking system.
TCR Pro & TCR Am	FIA-homologated TCR Touring Cars. TCR sub-classes based on driver ranking system.
NLS production cars
V3	Production cars with an engine capacity between 1600 and 1999 cc.
V4	Production cars with an engine capacity between 2000 and 2499 cc.
V5	Production cars with an engine capacity between 2500 and 2999 cc.
V6	Production cars with an engine capacity over 3500 cc.
VT1	Production cars with an engine capacity between 1000 and 1999 cc and a turbocharger.
VT2	Production cars with an engine capacity between 2000 and 2999 cc and a turbocharger.
VT3	Production cars with an engine capacity over 3000cc and a turbocharger.
VT Hybrid	Production cars with a hybrid-engine.
VT Elektro	Production cars with an electro-engine.
Porsche Endurance Trophy Nürburgring Class cars Cup classes are for single make identical or near identical specification cars
Cup 2	Porsche 992 GT3 Cup cars.
Cup 3	Porsche Cayman GT4 Trophy cars.
Cup Class cars Cup classes are for single make identical or near identical specification cars
Cup 5	BMW M2 CS cars.
Cup X	KTM X-Bow Cup cars.
M240i	BMW M240i Racing Cup cars.
OPC	Opel Astra OPC cars.
Gruppe H historic cars
H2	Pre-2008 production cars and purpose-built racecars with an engine capacity up to 1999 cc.
H4	Pre-2008 production cars and purpose-built racecars with an engine capacity between 2000 and 6250 cc.

== Entry Lists ==
=== SP9 ===
Team	Car	No.	Drivers	Class	Rounds
(Germany) Schnitzelalm Racing	Mercedes-AMG GT3 Evo	2	(Germany) Marcel Marchewicz	P	1
(Germany) Schnitzelalm Racing	Mercedes-AMG GT3 Evo	2	(Germany) Marek Böckmann	P	1
(Germany) Schnitzelalm Racing	Mercedes-AMG GT3 Evo	2	(Germany) Kenneth Heyer	P	1
(Germany) Schnitzelalm Racing	Mercedes-AMG GT3 Evo	2	(Germany) Carrie Schreiner	P	3–7
(Germany) Schnitzelalm Racing	Mercedes-AMG GT3 Evo	2	(Germany) Peter Terting	P	3–7
(Germany) Schnitzelalm Racing	Mercedes-AMG GT3 Evo	2	(Switzerland) Miklas Born	P	5
(Germany) Schnitzelalm Racing	Mercedes-AMG GT3 Evo	11	(Germany) Marcel Marchewicz	P	3–5, 7
(Germany) Schnitzelalm Racing	Mercedes-AMG GT3 Evo	11	(Switzerland) Miklas Born	P	3–4
(Germany) Schnitzelalm Racing	Mercedes-AMG GT3 Evo	11	(Germany) Marek Böckmann	P	4–5, 7
(Germany) Schnitzelalm Racing	Mercedes-AMG GT3 Evo	11	(United Kingdom) Philip Ellis	P	4
(Germany) Schnitzelalm Racing	Mercedes-AMG GT3 Evo	11	(Germany) Kenneth Heyer	P	7
(Germany) Falken Motorsports	Porsche 911 GT3 R	3	(France) Patrick Pilet	P	1
(Germany) Falken Motorsports	Porsche 911 GT3 R	3	(Germany) Marco Seefried	P	1
(Germany) Falken Motorsports	Porsche 911 GT3 R	3	(New Zealand) Jaxon Evans	P	2, 5
(Germany) Falken Motorsports	Porsche 911 GT3 R	3	(Belgium) Alessio Picariello	P	2, 5
(Germany) Falken Motorsports	Porsche 911 GT3 R	3	(Sweden) Joel Eriksson	P	4–5
(Germany) Falken Motorsports	Porsche 911 GT3 R	3	(Germany) Sven Müller	P	4–5
(Germany) Falken Motorsports	Porsche 911 GT3 R	3	(Germany) Tim Heinemann	P	7
(Germany) Falken Motorsports	Porsche 911 GT3 R	3	(Austria) Martin Ragginger	P	7
(Germany) Falken Motorsports	Porsche 911 GT3 R	4	(Austria) Martin Ragginger	P	1–2, 5
(Germany) Falken Motorsports	Porsche 911 GT3 R	4	(Germany) Lars Kern	P	1–2
(Germany) Falken Motorsports	Porsche 911 GT3 R	4	(Germany) Tim Heinemann	P	4
(Germany) Falken Motorsports	Porsche 911 GT3 R	4	(Belgium) Alessio Picariello	P	4
(Germany) Falken Motorsports	Porsche 911 GT3 R	4	(Austria) Klaus Bachler	P	5
(Germany) Falken Motorsports	Porsche 911 GT3 R	4	(Turkey) Ayhancan Güven	P	5
(Germany) Falken Motorsports	Porsche 911 GT3 R	4	(France) Côme Ledogar	P	5
(Germany) Scherer Sport Team Phoenix	Audi R8 LMS Evo II	5	(Germany) Vincent Kolb	P	All
(Germany) Scherer Sport Team Phoenix	Audi R8 LMS Evo II	5	(Germany) Frank Stippler	P	All
(Germany) Scherer Sport Team Phoenix	Audi R8 LMS Evo II	15	(South Africa) Kelvin van der Linde	P	2
(Germany) Scherer Sport Team Phoenix	Audi R8 LMS Evo II	15	(Netherlands) Robin Frijns	P	2
(Germany) Scherer Sport Team Phoenix	Audi R8 LMS Evo II	16	(Poland) Jakub Giermaziak	P	All
(Germany) Scherer Sport Team Phoenix	Audi R8 LMS Evo II	16	(Germany) Kim-Luis Schramm	P	1, 4–6, 8
(Germany) Scherer Sport Team Phoenix	Audi R8 LMS Evo II	16	(Switzerland) Ricardo Feller	P	1
(Germany) Scherer Sport Team Phoenix	Audi R8 LMS Evo II	16	(Italy) Michele Beretta	P	2
(Germany) Scherer Sport Team Phoenix	Audi R8 LMS Evo II	16	(Germany) René Rast	P	3
(Germany) Scherer Sport Team Phoenix	Audi R8 LMS Evo II	16	(Germany) Luca Engstler	P	6
(Germany) Scherer Sport Team Phoenix	Audi R8 LMS Evo II	16	(South Africa) Kelvin van der Linde	P	7
(Germany) Haupt Racing Team	Mercedes-AMG GT3 Evo	6	(Germany) Hubert Haupt	P	1–3, 6
(Germany) Haupt Racing Team	Mercedes-AMG GT3 Evo	6	(Switzerland) Philip Ellis	P	1–2
(Germany) Haupt Racing Team	Mercedes-AMG GT3 Evo	6	(Germany) Nico Bastian	P	1–2
(Germany) Haupt Racing Team	Mercedes-AMG GT3 Evo	6	(Germany) Luca Stolz	P	3
(Germany) Haupt Racing Team	Mercedes-AMG GT3 Evo	6	(Australia) Jordan Love	P	4, 6–7
(Germany) Haupt Racing Team	Mercedes-AMG GT3 Evo	6	(Austria) Lucas Auer	P	4, 7
(Germany) Haupt Racing Team	Mercedes-AMG GT3 Evo	6	(India) Arjun Maini	P	4, 7
(Germany) Mercedes-AMG Team Bilstein	Mercedes-AMG GT3 Evo	12	(Germany) Luca Stolz	P	1–2
(Germany) Mercedes-AMG Team Bilstein	Mercedes-AMG GT3 Evo	12	(Germany) Manuel Metzger	P	1–2
(Germany) Mercedes-AMG Team Bilstein	Mercedes-AMG GT3 Evo	12	(Switzerland) Raffaele Marciello	P	1
(Austria) Konrad Motorsport	Lamborghini Huracán GT3 Evo	7	(Italy) Michele di Martino	P	1, 4
(Austria) Konrad Motorsport	Lamborghini Huracán GT3 Evo	7	(Zimbabwe) Axcil Jefferies	P	1
(Austria) Konrad Motorsport	Lamborghini Huracán GT3 Evo	7	(Netherlands) Yelmer Buurman	P	4
(Austria) Konrad Motorsport	Lamborghini Huracán GT3 Evo	7	(Germany) Maximilian Hackländer	P	4
(Germany) Mercedes-AMG Team GetSpeed	Mercedes-AMG GT3 Evo	8	(United Kingdom) Adam Christodoulou	P	2
(Germany) Mercedes-AMG Team GetSpeed	Mercedes-AMG GT3 Evo	8	(Germany) Maro Engel	P	2
(Germany) Mercedes-AMG Team GetSpeed	Mercedes-AMG GT3 Evo	8	(Germany) Maximilian Götz	P	2
(Germany) Team GetSpeed Performance	Mercedes-AMG GT3 Evo	9	(United States) Janine Shoffner	PA	3
(Germany) Team GetSpeed Performance	Mercedes-AMG GT3 Evo	9	(Germany) Moritz Kranz	PA	3
(Germany) RaceIng - Racing Engineers GmbH	Audi R8 LMS Evo	14	(Germany) Bernhard Henzel	PA	2–4, 6
(Germany) RaceIng - Racing Engineers GmbH	Audi R8 LMS Evo	14	(Germany) Nick Wüstenhagen	PA	2–4, 6
(Germany) PROsport Racing	Aston Martin Vantage AMR GT3	17	(Belgium) Maxime Dumarey	PA	1–5, 7–8
(Germany) PROsport Racing	Aston Martin Vantage AMR GT3	17	(Belgium) Nico Verdonck	PA	1, 3, 6
(Germany) PROsport Racing	Aston Martin Vantage AMR GT3	17	(Belgium) Jean Glorieux	PA	2–5, 8
(Germany) PROsport Racing	Aston Martin Vantage AMR GT3	17	(Germany) Christoph Breuer	PA	4–7
(Hong Kong) KCMG	Porsche 911 GT3 R	18	(Norway) Dennis Olsen	P	1–2
(Hong Kong) KCMG	Porsche 911 GT3 R	18	(Australia) Josh Burdon	P	1–2
(Hong Kong) KCMG	Porsche 911 GT3 R	18	(New Zealand) Earl Bamber	P	2
(Germany) Schubert Motorsport	BMW M4 GT3	20	(United Kingdom) Alexander Sims	P	1
(Germany) Schubert Motorsport	BMW M4 GT3	20	(Finland) Jesse Krohn	P	1
(Germany) Schubert Motorsport	BMW M4 GT3	20	(Germany) Niklas Krütten	P	1
(United Kingdom) TF Sport AMR	Aston Martin Vantage AMR GT3	21	(Denmark) Marco Sørensen	P	2
(United Kingdom) TF Sport AMR	Aston Martin Vantage AMR GT3	21	(United Kingdom) David Pittard	P	2
(United Kingdom) TF Sport AMR	Aston Martin Vantage AMR GT3	21	(Belgium) Maxime Martin	P	2
(Germany) Audi Sport Team Car Collection	Audi R8 LMS Evo II	22	(Germany) Christopher Haase	P	1
(Germany) Audi Sport Team Car Collection	Audi R8 LMS Evo II	22	(Switzerland) Nico Müller	P	1
(Germany) Car Collection Motorsport 1 (Germany) Lionspeed by Car Collection Motorsport 3-6	Audi R8 LMS Evo II	23	(Italy) Lorenzo Rocco di Torrepadula	PA	1, 3–4, 6
(Germany) Car Collection Motorsport 1 (Germany) Lionspeed by Car Collection Motorsport 3-6	Audi R8 LMS Evo II	23	(Germany) Jörg Viebahn	PA	1, 3, 5–6
(Germany) Car Collection Motorsport 1 (Germany) Lionspeed by Car Collection Motorsport 3-6	Audi R8 LMS Evo II	23	(Germany) Klaus Koch	PA	1, 4, 6
(Germany) Car Collection Motorsport 1 (Germany) Lionspeed by Car Collection Motorsport 3-6	Audi R8 LMS Evo II	23	(Germany) Leon Köhler	PA	3–5
(Germany) Car Collection Motorsport 1 (Germany) Lionspeed by Car Collection Motorsport 3-6	Audi R8 LMS Evo II	23	(Germany) Dennis Fetzer	PA	4
(Germany) Car Collection Motorsport 1 (Germany) Lionspeed by Car Collection Motorsport 3-6	Audi R8 LMS Evo II	23	(Austria) Simon Reicher	PA	5
(Germany) Car Collection Motorsport 1 (Germany) Lionspeed by Car Collection Motorsport 3-6	Audi R8 LMS Evo II	23	(Germany) Florian Spengler	PA	5
(Germany) Lionspeed by Car Collection	Audi R8 LMS Evo II	24	(Germany) Patrick Kolb	P	1, 3, 6
(Germany) Lionspeed by Car Collection	Audi R8 LMS Evo II	24	(Germany) Dennis Fetzer	P	1, 3, 6
(Germany) Lionspeed by Car Collection	Audi R8 LMS Evo II	24	(Switzerland) Patric Niederhauser	P	1, 6
(Germany) Lionspeed by Car Collection	Audi R8 LMS Evo II	24	(Italy) Mattia Drudi	P	1
(Germany) Lionspeed by Car Collection	Audi R8 LMS Evo II	24	(Germany) Christopher Mies	P	6
(Germany) Lionspeed by Car Collection	Audi R8 LMS Evo II	24	(Germany) Patrick Kolb	PA	5
(Germany) Lionspeed by Car Collection	Audi R8 LMS Evo II	24	(Netherlands) Milan Dontje	PA	5
(Germany) Lionspeed by Car Collection	Audi R8 LMS Evo II	24	(Germany) Dennis Fetzer	PA	5
(Germany) Lionspeed by Car Collection	Audi R8 LMS Evo II	24	(Switzerland) Patric Niederhauser	PA	5
(Germany) Lionspeed by Car Collection	Audi R8 LMS Evo II	24	(Italy) Lorenzo Rocco di Torrepadula	PA	5
(Germany) Huber Motorsport	Porsche 911 GT3 R	25	(Germany) Nico Menzel	PA	1–2, 4, 6
(Germany) Huber Motorsport	Porsche 911 GT3 R	25	(Germany) Joachim Thyssen	PA	1–2, 4
(Germany) Huber Motorsport	Porsche 911 GT3 R	25	(Germany) Klaus Rader('Enzo')	PA	1–2, 4, 6
(Germany) Huber Motorsport	Porsche 911 GT3 R	25	(Germany) 'Jacob Schell'	PA	6
(Germany) Huber Motorsport	Porsche 911 GT3 R	25	(Germany) Nico Menzel	P	8
(Germany) Huber Motorsport	Porsche 911 GT3 R	25	(Germany) Dennis Fetzer	P	8
(Switzerland) Octane126	Ferrari 488 GT3	26	(Germany) Björn Grossmann	P	2, 5
(Switzerland) Octane126	Ferrari 488 GT3	26	(Switzerland) Simon Trummer	P	2
(Switzerland) Octane126	Ferrari 488 GT3	26	(Switzerland) Jonathan Hirschi	P	2
(Switzerland) Octane126	Ferrari 488 GT3	26	(Germany) Luca Ludwig	P	5
(Germany) Toksport WRT	Porsche 911 GT3 R	27	(France) Julien Andlauer	P	2
(Germany) Toksport WRT	Porsche 911 GT3 R	27	(Australia) Matt Campbell	P	2
(Germany) Toksport WRT	Porsche 911 GT3 R	27	(France) Mathieu Jaminet	P	2
(Germany) Montaplast by Land Motorsport	Audi R8 LMS Evo II	29	(Germany) Christopher Mies	P	1
(Germany) Montaplast by Land Motorsport	Audi R8 LMS Evo II	29	(Germany) Jusuf Owega	P	1
(Italy) Dinamic Motorsport	Porsche 911 GT3 R	30	(Belgium) Alessio Picariello	P	7
(Italy) Dinamic Motorsport	Porsche 911 GT3 R	30	(Belgium) Adrien De Leener	P	7
(Italy) Dinamic Motorsport	Porsche 911 GT3 R	38	(Italy) Matteo Cairoli	P	2
(Italy) Dinamic Motorsport	Porsche 911 GT3 R	38	(Austria) Thomas Preining	P	2
(Italy) Dinamic Motorsport	Porsche 911 GT3 R	38	(Belgium) Adrien De Leener	P	2
(Germany) Walkenhorst Motorsport	BMW M4 GT3	34	(Norway) Christian Krognes	P	All
(Germany) Walkenhorst Motorsport	BMW M4 GT3	34	(Finland) Sami-Matti Trogen	P	1–3, 5, 8
(Germany) Walkenhorst Motorsport	BMW M4 GT3	34	(Spain) Andy Soucek	P	1–2, 4
(Germany) Walkenhorst Motorsport	BMW M4 GT3	34	(United Kingdom) Ben Tuck	P	4–6
(Germany) Walkenhorst Motorsport	BMW M4 GT3	34	(United Kingdom) Jake Dennis	P	7
(Germany) Walkenhorst Motorsport	BMW M4 GT3	35	(Germany) Jörg Müller	P	1–3
(Germany) Walkenhorst Motorsport	BMW M4 GT3	35	(Germany) Mario von Bohlen	P	1–3
(Germany) Walkenhorst Motorsport	BMW M4 GT3	35	(United Kingdom) Ben Tuck	P	1–3
(Germany) Walkenhorst Motorsport	BMW M4 GT3	35	(Germany) Jörg Müller	PA	8
(Germany) Walkenhorst Motorsport	BMW M4 GT3	35	(Germany) Mario von Bohlen	PA	8
(Germany) Walkenhorst Motorsport	BMW M4 GT3	35	(Norway) Anders Buchardt	PA	8
(Germany) Walkenhorst Motorsport	BMW M4 GT3	36	(Germany) Henry Walkenhorst	Am	1–3, 5, 8
(Germany) Walkenhorst Motorsport	BMW M4 GT3	36	(Germany) Jörg Breuer	Am	1–3
(Germany) Walkenhorst Motorsport	BMW M4 GT3	36	(Germany) Friedrich von Bohlen	Am	1–2, 5, 8
(Germany) Walkenhorst Motorsport	BMW M4 GT3	36	(Norway) Anders Buchardt	Am	5
(Germany) Walkenhorst Motorsport	BMW M4 GT3	36	(Germany) Jörn Schmidt-Staade	Am	5
(Germany) Walkenhorst Motorsport	BMW M4 GT3	36	(Switzerland) Alexander Prinz	Am	8
(Germany) Walkenhorst Motorsport	BMW M4 GT3	36	(Germany) Henry Walkenhorst	PA	4, 6
(Germany) Walkenhorst Motorsport	BMW M4 GT3	36	(Germany) Jörg Müller	PA	4, 6–7
(Germany) Walkenhorst Motorsport	BMW M4 GT3	36	(Germany) Friedrich von Bohlen	PA	4, 6
(Germany) Walkenhorst Motorsport	BMW M4 GT3	36	(Germany) Jörg Breuer	PA	4
(Germany) Walkenhorst Motorsport	BMW M4 GT3	36	(Norway) Anders Buchardt	PA	7
(Germany) Walkenhorst Motorsport	BMW M4 GT3	36	(Germany) Dennis Fetzer	PA	7
(Germany) racing one	Ferrari 488 GT3	39	(Germany) Christian Kohlhaas	Am	2
(Germany) racing one	Ferrari 488 GT3	39	(Netherlands) Jules Szymkowiak	Am	2
(Germany) racing one	Ferrari 488 GT3	39	(Germany) Christian Kohlhaas	PA	5–6
(Germany) racing one	Ferrari 488 GT3	39	(United Kingdom) Jody Fannin	PA	5–6
(Germany) racing one	Ferrari 488 GT3	39	(Austria) Constantin Schöll	PA	5
(Germany) racing one	Ferrari 488 GT3	39	(United Kingdom) Will Tregurtha	PA	5
(Germany) racing one	Ferrari 488 GT3	39	(Italy) Michele di Martino	PA	5
(Germany) BMW M Motorsport	BMW M4 GT3	43	(Germany) Jens Klingmann	P	3
(Germany) BMW M Motorsport	BMW M4 GT3	43	(South Africa) Sheldon van der Linde	P	3
(Germany) BMW Junior Team	BMW M4 GT3	44	(United Kingdom) Daniel Harper	P	1–2
(Germany) BMW Junior Team	BMW M4 GT3	44	(Germany) Max Hesse	P	1–2
(Germany) BMW Junior Team	BMW M4 GT3	44	(United States) Neil Verhagen	P	1–2
(United States) CP Racing	Mercedes-AMG GT3 Evo	45	(United States) Charles Espenlaub	PA	6
(United States) CP Racing	Mercedes-AMG GT3 Evo	45	(United States) Joe Foster	PA	6
(Netherlands) Twin Busch by équipe vitesse	Audi R8 LMS Evo	50	(Germany) Michael Heimrich	Am	4, 6
(Netherlands) Twin Busch by équipe vitesse	Audi R8 LMS Evo	50	(Germany) Arno Klasen	Am	4, 6
(Germany) Mercedes-AMG Landgraf Young Talents 1-2 (Germany) Landgraf Motorsport 3-6	Mercedes-AMG GT3 Evo	55	(Germany) Luca-Sandro Trefz	P	All
(Germany) Mercedes-AMG Landgraf Young Talents 1-2 (Germany) Landgraf Motorsport 3-6	Mercedes-AMG GT3 Evo	55	(Germany) Patrick Assenheimer	P	1–5, 7–8
(Germany) Mercedes-AMG Landgraf Young Talents 1-2 (Germany) Landgraf Motorsport 3-6	Mercedes-AMG GT3 Evo	55	(Switzerland) Julien Apotheloz	P	3–7
(Germany) Mercedes-AMG Landgraf Young Talents 1-2 (Germany) Landgraf Motorsport 3-6	Mercedes-AMG GT3 Evo	55	(United Kingdom) Casper Stevenson	P	6
(Germany) Manthey Racing	Porsche 911 GT3 R	74	(Italy) Matteo Cairoli	P	7
(Germany) Manthey Racing	Porsche 911 GT3 R	74	(Norway) Dennis Olsen	P	7
(Germany) Manthey Racing	Porsche 911 GT3 R	911	(France) Frédéric Makowiecki	P	1–2
(Germany) Manthey Racing	Porsche 911 GT3 R	911	(Belgium) Laurens Vanthoor	P	1–2
(Germany) Manthey Racing	Porsche 911 GT3 R	911	(Denmark) Michael Christensen	P	1
(Germany) Manthey Racing	Porsche 911 GT3 R	911	(France) Kévin Estre	P	2
(Germany) Manthey Racing	Porsche 911 GT3 R	911	(New Zealand) Jaxon Evans	P	7
(Germany) Manthey Racing	Porsche 911 GT3 R	911	(Austria) Thomas Preining	P	7
(Germany) ROWE Racing	BMW M4 GT3	98	(United States) John Edwards	P	2
(Germany) ROWE Racing	BMW M4 GT3	98	(South Africa) Sheldon van der Linde	P	2
(Germany) ROWE Racing	BMW M4 GT3	98	(Germany) Marco Wittmann	P	2
(Germany) ROWE Racing	BMW M4 GT3	99	(United States) Connor De Phillippi	P	2
(Germany) ROWE Racing	BMW M4 GT3	99	(Brazil) Augusto Farfus	P	2
Entrylists

Icon	Class
P	Pro Cup
PA	Pro-Am Cup
Am	Am Cup

=== SPX ===
Team	Car	No.	Drivers	Rounds
(Germany) Falken Motorsports	Porsche 911 GT3 R (992)	4	(France) Julien Andlauer	7
(Germany) Falken Motorsports	Porsche 911 GT3 R (992)	4	(Austria) Klaus Bachler	7
(Italy) Dinamic Motorsport	Porsche 911 GT3 R (992)	30	(Italy) Matteo Cairoli	8
(Italy) Dinamic Motorsport	Porsche 911 GT3 R (992)	30	(France) Julien Andlauer	8
(Austria) True Racing	KTM X-Bow GT2 Concept	52	(Germany) Ferdinand Stuck	1–2
(Austria) True Racing	KTM X-Bow GT2 Concept	52	(Germany) Johannes Stuck	1–2
(Austria) True Racing	KTM X-Bow GT2 Concept	52	(Finland) Markus Palttala	1
(Austria) True Racing	KTM X-Bow GT2 Concept	52	(Austria) Max Hofer	2
(Austria) True Racing	KTM X-Bow GT2 Concept	53	(Austria) Reinhard Kofler	1–2, 6–7
(Austria) True Racing	KTM X-Bow GT2 Concept	53	(Norway) Mads Siljehaug	1–2, 6
(Austria) True Racing	KTM X-Bow GT2 Concept	53	(Germany) Tim Heinemann	1–2
(Austria) True Racing	KTM X-Bow GT2 Concept	53	(Austria) Max Hofer	1, 7
(United States) Glickenhaus Racing LLC	Scuderia Cameron Glickenhaus SCG 004c	56	(Germany) Thomas Mutsch	2
(United States) Glickenhaus Racing LLC	Scuderia Cameron Glickenhaus SCG 004c	56	(Germany) Felipe Fernández Laser	2
(United States) Glickenhaus Racing LLC	Scuderia Cameron Glickenhaus SCG 004c	56	(France) Franck Mailleux	2
(Germany) Manthey Racing	Porsche 911 GT3 R (992)	911	(France) Julien Andlauer	6
(Germany) Manthey Racing	Porsche 911 GT3 R (992)	911	(France) Frédéric Makowiecki	6

=== SP10 ===
Team	Car	No.	Drivers	Events
(Germany) Waldow Performance	Alpine A110 GT4	110	(Germany) Janis Waldow	1
(Germany) Waldow Performance	Alpine A110 GT4	110	(Luxembourg) Max Lamesch	1
(Germany) Waldow Performance	Alpine A110 GT4	110	(Germany) Andreas Patzelt	1
(Germany) Waldow Performance	Mercedes-AMG GT4	177	(Germany) Janis Waldow	3–8
(Germany) Waldow Performance	Mercedes-AMG GT4	177	(Germany) Andreas Patzelt	3–8
(Germany) Waldow Performance	Mercedes-AMG GT4	177	(Luxembourg) Max Lamesch	3–5, 8
(Germany) Waldow Performance	Mercedes-AMG GT4	177	(Turkey) Ersin Yücesan	5–6
(Germany) Black Falcon Team TEXTAR	Porsche 718 Cayman GT4 RS Clubsport	161	(Germany) Carsten Palluth	1–7
(Germany) Black Falcon Team TEXTAR	Porsche 718 Cayman GT4 RS Clubsport	161	(Germany) Tobias Wahl	1–7
(Germany) Black Falcon Team TEXTAR	Porsche 718 Cayman GT4 RS Clubsport	161	(Germany) Marco Müller	1–2
(Germany) Black Falcon Team TEXTAR	Porsche 718 Cayman GT4 RS Clubsport	161	(Germany) Reinhold Renger	3–4, 7
(Germany) Black Falcon Team TEXTAR	Porsche 718 Cayman GT4 RS Clubsport	161	(United States) Cabell Fisher	5–6
(Germany) Black Falcon Team TEXTAR	Porsche 718 Cayman GT4 RS Clubsport	162	(Germany) Alexander Akimenkov	5
(Germany) Black Falcon Team TEXTAR	Porsche 718 Cayman GT4 RS Clubsport	162	(United States) Cabell Fisher	5
(Germany) Black Falcon Team TEXTAR	Porsche 718 Cayman GT4 RS Clubsport	162	(Germany) Martin Meenen	5
(Germany) Black Falcon Team TEXTAR	Porsche 718 Cayman GT4 RS Clubsport	162	(Germany) Vasilii Selivanov	5
(Germany) Novel Racing with Toyo tire by Ring Racing	Toyota GR Supra GT4	170	(Germany) Michael Tischner	1–2, 4–5, 7
(Germany) Novel Racing with Toyo tire by Ring Racing	Toyota GR Supra GT4	170	(Germany) Andreas Gülden	1–2, 4–5, 7
(Germany) Novel Racing with Toyo tire by Ring Racing	Toyota GR Supra GT4	170	(Germany) Heiko Tönges	1–2, 4–5, 7
(Germany) PROsport Racing	Aston Martin Vantage AMR GT4	175	(Belgium) Guillaume Dumarey	5
(Germany) PROsport Racing	Aston Martin Vantage AMR GT4	175	(France) Célia Martin	5
(Germany) PROsport Racing	Aston Martin Vantage AMR GT4	175	(Belgium) Nico Verdonck	5
(Germany) PROsport Racing	Aston Martin Vantage AMR GT4	176	(Belgium) Guido Dumarey	All
(Germany) PROsport Racing	Aston Martin Vantage AMR GT4	176	(Ukraine) Yevgen Sokolovskiy	1, 5, 8
(Germany) PROsport Racing	Aston Martin Vantage AMR GT4	176	(United Kingdom) Alexander Walker	2, 5
(Germany) PROsport Racing	Aston Martin Vantage AMR GT4	176	(Norway) Emil Heyerdahl	3–4
(Germany) PROsport Racing	Aston Martin Vantage AMR GT4	176	(Belgium) Simon Balcaen	4
(Germany) PROsport Racing	Aston Martin Vantage AMR GT4	176	(Belgium) Alexander Hommerson	6
(Germany) PROsport Racing	Aston Martin Vantage AMR GT4	176	(Germany) Michael Hess	7
(Germany) Schnitzelalm Racing	Mercedes-AMG GT4	179	(Germany) Alexander Kolb	6
(Germany) Schnitzelalm Racing	Mercedes-AMG GT4	179	(Germany) Carl-Friedrich Kolb	6
(Germany) Schnitzelalm Racing	Mercedes-AMG GT4	179	(Germany) Marcel Marchewicz	6
(Germany) Toyo Tires by Ring Racing	Toyota GR Supra GT4	180	(Japan) Takayuki Kinoshita	7
(Germany) Toyo Tires by Ring Racing	Toyota GR Supra GT4	180	(Germany) Uwe Kleen	7
(Germany) Teichmann Racing	Toyota GR Supra GT4	188	(Germany) Georg Griesemann	7–8
(Germany) Teichmann Racing	Toyota GR Supra GT4	188	(Germany) Maik Rönnefarth	7–8
(Germany) Teichmann Racing	Toyota GR Supra GT4	188	(Germany) Yves Volte	7–8
(Germany) Teichmann Racing	Toyota GR Supra GT4	188	(Germany) Felix von der Laden	7–8
(Japan) Toyota Gazoo Racing Europe	Toyota GR Supra GT4	190	(Germany) Adrian Brusius	2
(Japan) Toyota Gazoo Racing Europe	Toyota GR Supra GT4	190	(Germany) Finn Unteroberdörster	2
Entrylists:

=== Porsche Endurance Trophy Nürburgring ===
Team	Car	No.	Drivers	Events
CUP2
(United States) RPM Racing	Porsche 992 GT3 Cup	101	(United States) Tracy Krohn	1–7
(United States) RPM Racing	Porsche 992 GT3 Cup	101	(Sweden) Niclas Jönsson	1–7
(United States) RPM Racing	Porsche 992 GT3 Cup	101	(Germany) Marco Holzer	5
(Germany) Black Falcon Team IDENTICA	Porsche 992 GT3 Cup	102	(Germany) Tobias Müller	All
(Germany) Black Falcon Team IDENTICA	Porsche 992 GT3 Cup	102	(Netherlands) Paul Harkema	1–5, 7–8
(Germany) Black Falcon Team IDENTICA	Porsche 992 GT3 Cup	102	(Italy) Gabriele Piana	5
(Germany) Black Falcon Team IDENTICA	Porsche 992 GT3 Cup	102	(Germany) Hendrik Von Danwitz	6
(Germany) Black Falcon	Porsche 992 GT3 Cup	103	(Germany) Noah Nageldiek	All
(Germany) Black Falcon	Porsche 992 GT3 Cup	103	(Germany) Maik Rosenberg	All
(Germany) Black Falcon	Porsche 992 GT3 Cup	103	(Germany) Peter Ludwig	1–4, 6–8
(Germany) Black Falcon	Porsche 992 GT3 Cup	103	(Germany) Reinhold Renger	5
(Germany) Black Falcon	Porsche 992 GT3 Cup	104	(Turkey) Mustafa Mehmet Kaya	1–7
(Germany) Black Falcon	Porsche 992 GT3 Cup	104	(Germany) Mike Stursberg	1, 3–7
(Germany) Black Falcon	Porsche 992 GT3 Cup	104	(Italy) Gabriele Piana	1, 4–6
(Germany) Black Falcon	Porsche 992 GT3 Cup	104	(Germany) Ben Bünnagel	2
(Germany) Black Falcon	Porsche 992 GT3 Cup	104	(Luxembourg) Carlos Rivas	2
(Germany) Black Falcon	Porsche 992 GT3 Cup	104	(Germany) Jörg Bergmeister	3
(Germany) Black Falcon	Porsche 992 GT3 Cup	104	(Germany) Hendrik Von Danwitz	7
(Germany) Team Mathol Racing	Porsche 992 GT3 Cup	107	(Germany) Arne Hoffmeister	All
(Germany) Team Mathol Racing	Porsche 992 GT3 Cup	107	(Austria) Harald Proczyk	1–2, 4
(Germany) Team Mathol Racing	Porsche 992 GT3 Cup	107	(France) Dorian Boccolacci	1, 3, 6–8
(Germany) Team Mathol Racing	Porsche 992 GT3 Cup	107	(Germany) Hendrik Still	4–5, 8
(Germany) Team Mathol Racing	Porsche 992 GT3 Cup	107	(Austria) Reinhard Kofler	5
(Germany) Frikadelli Racing Team	Porsche 992 GT3 Cup	111	(Germany) Klaus Abbelen	All
(Germany) Frikadelli Racing Team	Porsche 992 GT3 Cup	111	(Germany) 'JULES'	All
(Germany) Frikadelli Racing Team	Porsche 992 GT3 Cup	111	(Germany) Felipe Fernández Laser	1–2, 4–8
(Germany) Frikadelli Racing Team	Porsche 992 GT3 Cup	111	(Germany) Leon Köhler	3
(Germany) KKrämer Racing	Porsche 992 GT3 Cup	112	(Germany) Karsten Krämer	All
(Germany) KKrämer Racing	Porsche 992 GT3 Cup	112	(Germany) Christopher Brück	All
(Germany) KKrämer Racing	Porsche 992 GT3 Cup	112	(Germany) Moritz Kranz	1–2, 6–8
(Germany) KKrämer Racing	Porsche 992 GT3 Cup	112	(Germany) Alexey Veremenko	3–5
(Germany) KKrämer Racing	Porsche 992 GT3 Cup	112	(Germany) Florian Naumann	4–5
(United Kingdom) Moore International Motorsport	Porsche 992 GT3 Cup	113	(United Kingdom) Bill Cameron	1–6
(United Kingdom) Moore International Motorsport	Porsche 992 GT3 Cup	113	(Germany) Jim Cameron	1–6
(Germany) FK Performance Motorsport	Porsche 992 GT3 Cup	114	(Germany) Ben Bünnagel	1–3, 5
(Germany) FK Performance Motorsport	Porsche 992 GT3 Cup	114	(Germany) Nico Otto	1–3, 5
(Germany) FK Performance Motorsport	Porsche 992 GT3 Cup	114	(Germany) Sebastian Asch	1–2, 5
(Germany) G-Tech Competition	Porsche 992 GT3 Cup	117	(Germany) Patrik Grütter	1–6
(Germany) G-Tech Competition	Porsche 992 GT3 Cup	117	(Germany) Fabio Grosse	1–2, 4–6
(Germany) G-Tech Competition	Porsche 992 GT3 Cup	117	(Germany) Herbert Lösch	3–4
(Germany) Clickversicherung.de Team	Porsche 992 GT3 Cup	119	(Germany) Robin Chrzanowski	2–7
(Germany) Clickversicherung.de Team	Porsche 992 GT3 Cup	119	(Germany) Kersten Jodexnis	2–7
(Germany) Clickversicherung.de Team	Porsche 992 GT3 Cup	119	(New Zealand) Peter Scharmach	2–7
(Germany) AVIA W&S Motorsport	Porsche 992 GT3 Cup	120	(Germany) Daniel Blickle	All
(Germany) AVIA W&S Motorsport	Porsche 992 GT3 Cup	120	(Germany) Tim Scheerbarth	1–6
(Germany) AVIA W&S Motorsport	Porsche 992 GT3 Cup	120	(Germany) Ralf Schall	1–2
(Germany) AVIA W&S Motorsport	Porsche 992 GT3 Cup	120	(Germany) David Jahn	3–8
(Belgium) Mühlner Motorsport	Porsche 992 GT3 Cup	123	(Germany) Marcel Hoppe	All
(Belgium) Mühlner Motorsport	Porsche 992 GT3 Cup	123	(Germany) Nick Salewsky	All
(Belgium) Mühlner Motorsport	Porsche 992 GT3 Cup	123	(Germany) Thorsten Jung	2–4
(Belgium) Mühlner Motorsport	Porsche 992 GT3 Cup	123	(Germany) Michael Rebhan	5
(Belgium) Mühlner Motorsport	Porsche 992 GT3 Cup	123	(Italy) Michele di Martino	6–8
(Germany) Huber Motorsport	Porsche 992 GT3 Cup	125	(Germany) Hans Wehrmann	1–6
(Germany) Huber Motorsport	Porsche 992 GT3 Cup	125	(Germany) 'Jacob Schell'	1–5
(Germany) Huber Motorsport	Porsche 992 GT3 Cup	125	(Germany) Stefan Aust	1, 5
(Germany) Huber Motorsport	Porsche 992 GT3 Cup	125	(Germany) Christian Bollrath	2
(Germany) Huber Motorsport	Porsche 992 GT3 Cup	125	(Germany) Joachim Thyssen	6
CUP3
	Porsche 718 Cayman GT4 Clubsport	940	(Germany) Heinz Dolfen	1
	Porsche 718 Cayman GT4 Clubsport	940	(Germany) John Lee Schambony	1
	Porsche 718 Cayman GT4 Clubsport	940	(Germany) Joachim Schulz	1
(Germany) 9und11 Racing	Porsche 718 Cayman GT4 Clubsport	944	(Germany) Leonard Oehme	All
(Germany) 9und11 Racing	Porsche 718 Cayman GT4 Clubsport	944	(Germany) Ralf Oehme	1
(Germany) 9und11 Racing	Porsche 718 Cayman GT4 Clubsport	944	(Germany) Niklas Oehme	2–8
(Germany) 9und11 Racing	Porsche 718 Cayman GT4 Clubsport	944	(Germany) Moritz Oehme	3–8
(Germany) Max Kruse Racing	Porsche 718 GT4 Clubsport	947	(Netherlands) Jan Jaap Van Roon	4–5
(Germany) Max Kruse Racing	Porsche 718 GT4 Clubsport	947	(Germany) Heiko Hammel	4
(Germany) Max Kruse Racing	Porsche 718 GT4 Clubsport	947	(Germany) Alexander Kroker	5
(Germany) Team Sorg Rennsport	Porsche 718 Cayman GT4 Clubsport	949	(Germany) Stefan Beyer	1–3, 5–8
(Germany) Team Sorg Rennsport	Porsche 718 Cayman GT4 Clubsport	949	(Germany) Heiko Eichenberg	1–3, 5–8
(Germany) Team Sorg Rennsport	Porsche 718 Cayman GT4 Clubsport	949	(Germany) Torsten Kratz	1, 3, 5–6, 8
(Germany) Team Sorg Rennsport	Porsche 718 Cayman GT4 Clubsport	959	(Germany) Fidel Leib	All
(Germany) Team Sorg Rennsport	Porsche 718 Cayman GT4 Clubsport	959	(Finland) Philip Miemois	All
(Germany) Team Sorg Rennsport	Porsche 718 Cayman GT4 Clubsport	959	(Germany) Moritz Wiskirchen	1, 4–5
(Germany) Team Sorg Rennsport	Porsche 718 Cayman GT4 Clubsport	959	(Ukraine) Dmytro Ryzhak	2–3
(Germany) Team Sorg Rennsport	Porsche 718 Cayman GT4 Clubsport	959	(Germany) Heiko Eichenberg	4
(Germany) Team Sorg Rennsport	Porsche 718 Cayman GT4 Clubsport	959	(Estonia) Martin Rump	5–8
(Germany) Schmickler Performance powered by Ravenol	Porsche 718 Cayman GT4 Clubsport	950	(Germany) Horst Baumann	2–4, 6–8
(Germany) Schmickler Performance powered by Ravenol	Porsche 718 Cayman GT4 Clubsport	950	(Germany) Stefan Schmickler	2–4, 6–8
(Germany) Schmickler Performance powered by Ravenol	Porsche 718 Cayman GT4 Clubsport	969	(Switzerland) Mauro Calamia	All
(Germany) Schmickler Performance powered by Ravenol	Porsche 718 Cayman GT4 Clubsport	969	(Switzerland) Ivan Jacoma	All
(Germany) Schmickler Performance powered by Ravenol	Porsche 718 Cayman GT4 Clubsport	969	(Germany) Kai Riemer	All
(Germany) Smyrlis Racing	Porsche 718 Cayman GT4 Clubsport	952	(Germany) Christopher Rink	3–8
(Germany) Smyrlis Racing	Porsche 718 Cayman GT4 Clubsport	952	(Italy) Francesco Merlini	3–8
(Germany) Smyrlis Racing	Porsche 718 Cayman GT4 Clubsport	952	(Germany) Philipp Stahlschmidt	3–7
(Germany) Smyrlis Racing	Porsche 718 Cayman GT4 Clubsport	953	(Germany) Christopher Rink	1–2
(Germany) Smyrlis Racing	Porsche 718 Cayman GT4 Clubsport	953	(Germany) Philipp Stahlschmidt	1–2
(Germany) Smyrlis Racing	Porsche 718 Cayman GT4 Clubsport	953	(Italy) Francesco Merlini	1–2
(Germany) Team Mathol Racing	Porsche 718 Cayman GT4 Clubsport	954	(Germany) Henning Cramer	3
(Germany) Team Mathol Racing	Porsche 718 Cayman GT4 Clubsport	955	(Germany) Rüdiger Schicht	1–2, 5–8
(Germany) Team Mathol Racing	Porsche 718 Cayman GT4 Clubsport	955	(Germany) 'Montana'	1–2, 5–8
(Germany) Team Mathol Racing	Porsche 718 Cayman GT4 Clubsport	955	(Germany) Alex Fielenbach	1–2, 5–8
(Germany) Team Mathol Racing	Porsche 718 Cayman GT4 Clubsport	955	(Germany) Arne Hoffmeister	1
(Germany) Team Mathol Racing	Porsche 718 Cayman GT4 Clubsport	956	(Germany) Rüdiger Schicht	3–4
(Germany) Team Mathol Racing	Porsche 718 Cayman GT4 Clubsport	956	(Germany) 'Montana'	3–4
(Germany) Team Mathol Racing	Porsche 718 Cayman GT4 Clubsport	956	(Germany) Alex Fielenbach	3–4
(Germany) Team Mathol Racing	Porsche 718 Cayman GT4 Clubsport	956	(Sweden) Gustav Bard	6
(Germany) Team Mathol Racing	Porsche 718 Cayman GT4 Clubsport	956	(Sweden) Patrik Skoog	6
(Germany) Team Mathol Racing	Porsche 718 Cayman GT4 Clubsport	956	(Germany) Sebastian Schäfer	6
(Germany) AVIA W&S Motorsport	Porsche 718 Cayman GT4 Clubsport	960	(France) 'SVITTEL'	1–6
(Germany) AVIA W&S Motorsport	Porsche 718 Cayman GT4 Clubsport	960	(Germany) Marius Rauer	1–6
(Germany) AVIA W&S Motorsport	Porsche 718 Cayman GT4 Clubsport	960	(Luxembourg) Daniel Bohr	1–6
(Germany) AVIA W&S Motorsport	Porsche 718 Cayman GT4 Clubsport	961	(Germany) Jürgen Vöhringer	1–3, 5–8
(Germany) AVIA W&S Motorsport	Porsche 718 Cayman GT4 Clubsport	961	(Germany) René Höber	1–3, 5–8
(Germany) AVIA W&S Motorsport	Porsche 718 Cayman GT4 Clubsport	961	(Luxembourg) Sébastien Carcone	2
(Germany) AVIA W&S Motorsport	Porsche 718 Cayman GT4 Clubsport	961	(Germany) Dirk Biermann	5–6
(Germany) AVIA W&S Motorsport	Porsche 718 Cayman GT4 Clubsport	962	(Germany) Jürgen Vöhringer	4
(Germany) AVIA W&S Motorsport	Porsche 718 Cayman GT4 Clubsport	962	(Germany) René Höber	4
(Germany) AVIA W&S Motorsport	Porsche 718 Cayman GT4 Clubsport	962	(France) 'SVITTEL'	7–8
(Germany) AVIA W&S Motorsport	Porsche 718 Cayman GT4 Clubsport	962	(Germany) Marius Rauer	7–8
(Germany) AVIA W&S Motorsport	Porsche 718 Cayman GT4 Clubsport	962	(Luxembourg) Daniel Bohr	7–8
(Germany) Huber Racing	Porsche 718 Cayman GT4 Clubsport	963	(Germany) David Kiefer	5–6
(Germany) Huber Racing	Porsche 718 Cayman GT4 Clubsport	963	(Germany) Marius Kiefer	5–6
(Germany) Huber Racing	Porsche 718 Cayman GT4 Clubsport	963	(Germany) Stefan Kiefer	5–6
(Germany) Huber Racing	Porsche 718 Cayman GT4 Clubsport	963	(Austria) Luca Rettenbacher	5–6
(Germany) Aimpoint Racing by Rothfuss Best Gabion	Porsche 718 Cayman GT4 Clubsport	964	(Germany) Axel Friedhoff	1–4
(Germany) Aimpoint Racing by Rothfuss Best Gabion	Porsche 718 Cayman GT4 Clubsport	964	(Germany) Max Friedhoff	1–4
(Germany) G-Tech Competition	Porsche 718 Cayman GT4 Clubsport	971	(Germany) Patrik Grütter	7–8
(Germany) G-Tech Competition	Porsche 718 Cayman GT4 Clubsport	971	(Germany) Fabio Grosse	7–8
(Germany) KKrämer Racing	Porsche 718 Cayman GT4 Clubsport	974	(United Kingdom) Oliver Allwood	2
(Germany) KKrämer Racing	Porsche 718 Cayman GT4 Clubsport	974	(Germany) Jan-Boris Schmäing	2
(Germany) KKrämer Racing	Porsche 718 Cayman GT4 Clubsport	974	(Germany) Olaf Baunack	2
(Germany) KKrämer Racing	Porsche 718 Cayman GT4 Clubsport	974	(Germany) Herbert Lösch	2
(Germany) KKrämer Racing	Porsche 718 Cayman GT4 Clubsport	974	(Germany) Alexey Veremenko	6, 8
(Germany) KKrämer Racing	Porsche 718 Cayman GT4 Clubsport	974	(Germany) Heinz Dolfen	8
(Germany) KKrämer Racing	Porsche 718 Cayman GT4 Clubsport	974	(Germany) Karl-Heinz Meyer	8
(Germany) KKrämer Racing	Porsche 718 Cayman GT4 Clubsport	974	(Germany) Matthias Beckwermert	8
(Germany) KKrämer Racing	Porsche 718 Cayman GT4 Clubsport	975	(United States) Andreas Gabler	2
(Germany) KKrämer Racing	Porsche 718 Cayman GT4 Clubsport	975	(Germany) Henning Cramer	2
(Germany) KKrämer Racing	Porsche 718 Cayman GT4 Clubsport	977	(Germany) Alexander Kroker	1–2
(Germany) KKrämer Racing	Porsche 718 Cayman GT4 Clubsport	977	(Germany) Florian Naumann	1–2
(Germany) KKrämer Racing	Porsche 718 Cayman GT4 Clubsport	977	(Germany) Matthias Beckwermert	1, 3
(Germany) KKrämer Racing	Porsche 718 Cayman GT4 Clubsport	977	(Germany) Alexey Veremenko	2
(Germany) KKrämer Racing	Porsche 718 Cayman GT4 Clubsport	977	(Luxembourg) Sébastien Carcone	3–5
(Germany) KKrämer Racing	Porsche 718 Cayman GT4 Clubsport	977	(Germany) Steffen Höber	3–4
(Germany) KKrämer Racing	Porsche 718 Cayman GT4 Clubsport	977	(Germany) Heinz Dolfen	4–6
(Germany) KKrämer Racing	Porsche 718 Cayman GT4 Clubsport	977	(Germany) Holger Schnautz	4
(Germany) KKrämer Racing	Porsche 718 Cayman GT4 Clubsport	977	(Germany) Kim Berwanger	5
(Germany) KKrämer Racing	Porsche 718 Cayman GT4 Clubsport	977	(United States) 'Ace Robey'	5
(Germany) KKrämer Racing	Porsche 718 Cayman GT4 Clubsport	977	(Germany) Lars Holtkamp	5
(Germany) KKrämer Racing	Porsche 718 Cayman GT4 Clubsport	977	(Germany) Herbert Lösch	6
(Germany) KKrämer Racing	Porsche 718 Cayman GT4 Clubsport	977	(Denmark) Henrik Bollerslev	6
(Germany) KKrämer Racing	Porsche 718 Cayman GT4 Clubsport	978	(Germany) Herbert Lösch	1–2
(Germany) KKrämer Racing	Porsche 718 Cayman GT4 Clubsport	978	(Germany) Olaf Baunack	1–2
(Germany) KKrämer Racing	Porsche 718 Cayman GT4 Clubsport	978	(Germany) Karl-Heinz Meyer	1, 3–4
(Germany) KKrämer Racing	Porsche 718 Cayman GT4 Clubsport	978	(Germany) Moritz Oehme	1
(Germany) KKrämer Racing	Porsche 718 Cayman GT4 Clubsport	978	(Germany) Danny Lehner	3, 6
(Germany) KKrämer Racing	Porsche 718 Cayman GT4 Clubsport	978	(Germany) Marc Roitzheim	3
(Germany) KKrämer Racing	Porsche 718 Cayman GT4 Clubsport	978	(Germany) Danny Hirschauer	4, 6
(Germany) KKrämer Racing	Porsche 718 Cayman GT4 Clubsport	978	(Germany) Jan-Boris Schmäing	4
(Germany) KKrämer Racing	Porsche 718 Cayman GT4 Clubsport	978	(United Kingdom) Oliver Allwood	4
(Germany) KKrämer Racing	Porsche 718 Cayman GT4 Clubsport	978	(Germany) Heinz Dolfen	7
(Germany) KKrämer Racing	Porsche 718 Cayman GT4 Clubsport	978	(United States) Andreas Gabler	7
(Germany) KKrämer Racing	Porsche 718 Cayman GT4 Clubsport	978	(Germany) Alexey Veremenko	7
(Germany) FK Performance Motorsport	Porsche 718 Cayman GT4 Clubsport	976	(Germany) Moritz Oberheim	All
(Germany) FK Performance Motorsport	Porsche 718 Cayman GT4 Clubsport	976	(Germany) Thorsten Wolter	All
(Germany) FK Performance Motorsport	Porsche 718 Cayman GT4 Clubsport	976	(Germany) Jens Moetefindt	1–5, 7–8
(Germany) FK Performance Motorsport	Porsche 718 Cayman GT4 Clubsport	976	(Germany) Christian Konnerth	4–5
(Germany) Black Falcon	Porsche 718 Cayman GT4 Clubsport	980	(United States) Cabell Fisher	4
(Germany) Black Falcon	Porsche 718 Cayman GT4 Clubsport	980	(Belgium) Didier Glorieux	4
(Germany) Black Falcon	Porsche 718 Cayman GT4 Clubsport	980	(Germany) Axel Sartingen	8
(Germany) Black Falcon	Porsche 718 Cayman GT4 Clubsport	980	(Germany) Daniel Schwerfeld	8
Entrylists:

=== TCR ===
Team	Car	No.	Drivers	Class	Rounds
(Norway) Møller Bil Motorsport	Audi RS 3 LMS TCR	801	(Norway) Håkon Schjærin	Am	2–3, 6–8
(Norway) Møller Bil Motorsport	Audi RS 3 LMS TCR	801	(Norway) Kenneth Østvold	Am	2–3, 6–8
(Norway) Møller Bil Motorsport	Audi RS 3 LMS TCR	801	(Norway) Anders Lindstad	Am	2, 6–7
(Norway) Møller Bil Motorsport	Audi RS 3 LMS TCR	801	(Norway) Atle Gulbrandsen	Am	3, 8
	Volkswagen Golf GTI TCR	803	(Germany) Sebastian Schemmann	Am	6
	Volkswagen Golf GTI TCR	803	(Italy) Florian Haller	Am	6
	Volkswagen Golf GTI TCR	803	(Italy) Daniel Fink	Am	6
(Germany) asBest Racing	Cupra León TCR	808	(Switzerland) Roger Vögeli	Am	1–2, 6
(Germany) asBest Racing	Cupra León TCR	808	(Germany) Jens Wulf	Am	1, 6
(Germany) asBest Racing	Cupra León TCR	808	(Switzerland) Roland Schmid	Am	2
(Germany) asBest Racing	Cupra León TCR	808	(Germany) Meik Utsch	Am	6–8
(Germany) asBest Racing	Cupra León TCR	808	(Germany) Sebastian Schemmann	Am	7–8
(Germany) asBest Racing	Cupra León TCR	808	(Germany) Thomas Ardelt	Am	8
(Germany) Bonk Motorsport	Cupra León TCR	810	(Germany) Max Partl	Am	2
(Germany) Bonk Motorsport	Cupra León TCR	810	(Switzerland) Alexander Prinz	Am	2
(Germany) Max Kruse Racing	Audi RS 3 LMS TCR	811	(Denmark) 'Peter Hansen'	Am	1–2, 4
(Germany) Max Kruse Racing	Audi RS 3 LMS TCR	811	(Denmark) 'Lars Nielsen'	Am	1–2, 4
(Germany) MSC Sinzig	Volkswagen Golf VII TCR	820	(Germany) Marco Knappmeier	Am	4
(Germany) MSC Sinzig	Volkswagen Golf VII TCR	820	(Germany) Dirk Groneck	Am	4
(Germany) Bonk Motorsport	Peugeot 308 Racing Cup TCR	821	(Germany) Jürgen Nett	Am	6
(Germany) Bonk Motorsport	Peugeot 308 Racing Cup TCR	821	(Germany) Joachim Nett	Am	6
(Germany) Lubner Motorsport	Opel Astra TCR	822	(Switzerland) Roger Vögeli	Am	3
(Germany) Lubner Motorsport	Opel Astra TCR	822	(Germany) Michael Brüggenkamp	Am	3
(Germany) Lubner Motorsport	Opel Astra TCR	822	(Germany) Lucas Waltermann	Am	3
(Germany) Scherer Sport	Audi RS 3 LMS TCR	830	(Switzerland) Matthias Schläppi	Am	8
(Germany) Scherer Sport	Audi RS 3 LMS TCR	830	(Germany) Christoph Breuer	Am	8
(Germany) Scherer Sport	Audi RS 3 LMS TCR	830	(Germany) Luca Engstler	Am	8
(Germany) Scherer Sport	Audi RS 3 LMS TCR	833	(Germany) Andreas Gülden	Am	3, 6
(Germany) Scherer Sport	Audi RS 3 LMS TCR	833	(Germany) Christoph Breuer	Am	3
(Germany) Scherer Sport	Audi RS 3 LMS TCR	833	(Germany) Benjamin Leuchter	Am	3
(Germany) Scherer Sport	Audi RS 3 LMS TCR	833	(Switzerland) Matthias Schläppi	Am	6
(Germany) Scherer Sport	Audi RS 3 LMS TCR	833	(Germany) Michael Bohrer	Am	6
Entrylists:

Icon	Class
P	Pro Cup
Am	Am Cup

=== Other classes ===
==== NLS specials ====
Team	Car	No.	Drivers	Events
SP8T
(Germany) BMW M Motorsport	BMW M4 GT4 Concept	51	(Netherlands) Stef Dusseldorp	2
(Germany) BMW M Motorsport	BMW M4 GT4 Concept	51	(Germany) Jörg Weidinger	2
(Germany) BMW M Motorsport	BMW M4 GT4 Concept	51	(Austria) Philipp Eng	2
(Germany) BMW M Motorsport	BMW M4 GT4 Concept	51	(Sweden) Erik Johansson	2
(Germany) BMW M Motorsport	BMW M4 GT4 Concept	54	(Austria) Philipp Eng	2
(Germany) BMW M Motorsport	BMW M4 GT4 Concept	54	(Sweden) Erik Johansson	2
(Germany) BMW M Motorsport	BMW M4 GT4 Concept	54	(Germany) Jörg Weidinger	2
(Germany) BMW M Motorsport	BMW M4 GT4 Concept	54	(United Kingdom) Daniel Harper	3
(Germany) BMW M Motorsport	BMW M4 GT4 Concept	54	(Germany) Max Hesse	3
(Germany) BMW M Motorsport	BMW M4 GT4 Concept	54	(United States) Neil Verhagen	3
(Germany) BMW M Motorsport	BMW M2 Competition	160	(Sweden) Erik Johansson	1
(Germany) BMW M Motorsport	BMW M2 Competition	160	(Germany) Jörg Weidinger	1
(Germany) Giti Tire Motorsport By WS Racing	BMW M4 GT4	150	(France) Célia Martin	2
(Germany) Giti Tire Motorsport By WS Racing	BMW M4 GT4	150	(Liechtenstein) Fabienne Wohlwend	2
(Japan) Toyota Gazoo Racing Europe	Toyota GR Supra GT4	155	(Germany) Adrian Brusius	1
(Japan) Toyota Gazoo Racing Europe	Toyota GR Supra GT4	155	(Germany) Finn Unteroberdörster	1
SP8
(Germany) Schnitzelalm Racing	Aston Martin Vantage GT4	132	(Germany) Walter Wilhelm Laschet	6
(Germany) Schnitzelalm Racing	Aston Martin Vantage GT4	132	(Germany) Fabio Laschet	6
SP7
(Germany) RPM Racing	Porsche 991 GT3 I Cup	57	(Czech Republic) Milan Kondidek	1–4
(Germany) RPM Racing	Porsche 991 GT3 I Cup	57	(Luxembourg) Bob Wilwert	1–4
(Germany) RPM Racing	Porsche 991 GT3 I Cup	57	(Belgium) Kris Cools	4
(Germany) RPM Racing	Porsche 991 GT3 I Cup	58	(Germany) Lukas Moesgen	3
(Germany) RPM Racing	Porsche 991 GT3 I Cup	58	(Germany) Christopher Gerhard	3
(Germany) RPM Racing	Porsche 991 GT3 I Cup	58	(South Korea) Jang Han Choi	3
(Germany) RPM Racing	Porsche 991 GT3 I Cup	58	(Germany) Philip Hamprecht	3
(Germany) RPM Racing	Porsche 991 GT3 I Cup	58	(Czech Republic) Milan Kondidek	6
(Germany) RPM Racing	Porsche 991 GT3 I Cup	58	(Belgium) Kris Cools	6
(Germany) 9und11 Racing	Porsche 991 GT3 Cup MR	60	(Germany) Georg Goder	4–5
(Germany) 9und11 Racing	Porsche 991 GT3 Cup MR	60	(Germany) Ralf Oehme	4–5
(Germany) 9und11 Racing	Porsche 991 GT3 Cup MR	60	(Germany) Martin Schlüter	4–5
(Germany) 9und11 Racing	Porsche 991 GT3 Cup MR	60	(Germany) Carl-Friedrich Kolb	4–5
(Germany) 9und11 Racing	Porsche 991 GT3 I Cup	65	(Germany) Georg Goder	1, 3, 6–7
(Germany) 9und11 Racing	Porsche 991 GT3 I Cup	65	(Germany) Martin Schlüter	1, 3, 6–7
(Germany) 9und11 Racing	Porsche 991 GT3 I Cup	65	(Germany) Ralf Oehme	3, 6–7
(Germany) PLUSLINE Racing Team	Porsche Cayman GT4 CS	62	(Germany) Reiner Neuffer	8
(Germany) PLUSLINE Racing Team	Porsche Cayman GT4 CS	62	(Germany) Fabio Sacchi	8
(Germany) Huber Motorsport	Porsche 991 GT3 I Cup	68	(Germany) 'Rodriguez Menzl'	3
(Germany) Huber Motorsport	Porsche 991 GT3 I Cup	68	(Germany) Alexander Mies	3
(Germany) Huber Motorsport	Porsche 991 GT3 I Cup	68	(Belgium) Aris Balanian	5–6
(Germany) Huber Motorsport	Porsche 991 GT3 I Cup	68	(United States) Ramana Lagemann	5
(Germany) Huber Motorsport	Porsche 991 GT3 I Cup	68	(Germany) Christian Bollrath	5
(Germany) Huber Motorsport	Porsche 991 GT3 I Cup	70	(Germany) 'Rodriguez Menzl'	2
(Germany) Huber Motorsport	Porsche 991 GT3 I Cup	70	(Germany) Stefan Aust	2
(Germany) Clickversicherung.de Team	Porsche 991 GT3 Cup MR	69	(Germany) Robin Chrzanowski	1
(Germany) Clickversicherung.de Team	Porsche 991 GT3 Cup MR	69	(Germany) Kersten Jodexnis	1
(Germany) Clickversicherung.de Team	Porsche 991 GT3 Cup MR	69	(New Zealand) Peter Scharmach	1
SP6
	BMW M3	196	(United Kingdom) 'Dave'	5
	BMW M3	196	(Australia) 'Ric'	5
	BMW M3	196	(United Kingdom) Adam Sharpe	5
SP5
SP4
(Japan) Toyota Gazoo Racing	Toyota GR 86	244	(Japan) Masahiro Sasaki	3, 5
(Japan) Toyota Gazoo Racing	Toyota GR 86	244	(Japan) Tatsuya Kataoka	3
(Japan) Toyota Gazoo Racing	Toyota GR 86	244	(Japan) Takamitsu Matsui	5
(Japan) Toyota Gazoo Racing	Toyota GR 86	244	(Japan) Hisashi Yabuki	5
(Germany) MSG Bayerischer Wald Hutthurm e.V. im ADAC	BMW M3 E90 325i	250	(Germany) Jörg Schönfelder	2–6, 8
(Germany) MSG Bayerischer Wald Hutthurm e.V. im ADAC	BMW M3 E90 325i	250	(Germany) Christian Schotte	2–5
(Germany) MSG Bayerischer Wald Hutthurm e.V. im ADAC	BMW M3 E90 325i	250	(Germany) Serge van Vooren	2, 4–6, 8
(Switzerland) Hofor - Racing	BMW E46	251	(Germany) Bernd Küpper	5
(Switzerland) Hofor - Racing	BMW E46	251	(Germany) Kevin Küpper	5
(Switzerland) Hofor - Racing	BMW E46	251	(Germany) Manuel Dormagen	5
(Switzerland) Hofor - Racing	BMW E46	251	(Germany) Sven Oepen	5
	BMW 346C	254	(Germany) Ingo Oepen	2–6
	BMW 346C	254	(Germany) Theodor Devolescu	2–5
	BMW 346C	254	(Germany) Henrik Launhardt	2, 5–6
	BMW 346C	254	(Germany) Klaus Müller	4
	BMW 346C	254	(Germany) Thorsten Köppert	5
	BMW 346C	254	(Germany) Uwe Diekert	6
SP4T
	Porsche 718 Cayman GT4 RS Clubsport	260	(Germany) Alexander Köppen	5
	Porsche 718 Cayman GT4 RS Clubsport	260	(Germany) Sebastian Rings	5
	Porsche 718 Cayman GT4 RS Clubsport	260	(Germany) Jacek Pydys	5
(Germany) Racing Group Eifel by NEXEN TIRE Motorsport	Porsche 718 Cayman GT4 RS Clubsport	263	(Germany) Norbert Fischer	All
(Germany) Racing Group Eifel by NEXEN TIRE Motorsport	Porsche 718 Cayman GT4 RS Clubsport	263	(Germany) Fabian Peitzmeier	All
(Germany) Racing Group Eifel by NEXEN TIRE Motorsport	Porsche 718 Cayman GT4 RS Clubsport	263	(Germany) Ralf Zensen	1–3, 5, 8
(Germany) Racing Group Eifel by NEXEN TIRE Motorsport	Porsche 718 Cayman GT4 RS Clubsport	263	(Germany) Christian Dannesberger	1, 4
(Germany) Racing Group Eifel by NEXEN TIRE Motorsport	Porsche 718 Cayman GT4 RS Clubsport	263	(Germany) Jürgen Bretschneider	4–8
(Germany) Racing Group Eifel by NEXEN TIRE Motorsport	Porsche 718 Cayman GT4 RS Clubsport	263	(Netherlands) Patrick Huisman	5
SP3
(Germany) Automobilclub von Deutschland	Opel Manta (Flying Fox) GT	269	(Germany) Hans-Olaf Beckmann	1
(Germany) Automobilclub von Deutschland	Opel Manta (Flying Fox) GT	269	(Germany) Peter Hass	1
(Germany) Automobilclub von Deutschland	Opel Manta (Flying Fox) GT	269	(Germany) Volker Strycek	1
(Belgium) Pit Lane - AMC Sankt Vith	Toyota GT86 Cup	270	(Belgium) 'Brody'	2–3, 5
(Belgium) Pit Lane - AMC Sankt Vith	Toyota GT86 Cup	270	(Belgium) Jacques Derenne	2–3, 5
(Belgium) Pit Lane - AMC Sankt Vith	Toyota GT86 Cup	270	(Italy) Bruno Barbaro	2–3, 5
(Belgium) Pit Lane - AMC Sankt Vith	Toyota GT86 Cup	270	(Belgium) Olivier Muytjens	3, 5
(Belgium) Pit Lane - AMC Sankt Vith	Toyota GT86 Cup	270	(Belgium) Vanina Ickx	5
(Belgium) Pit Lane - AMC Sankt Vith	Toyota GT86 Cup	271	(Belgium) Mathieu Castelein	1, 5
(Belgium) Pit Lane - AMC Sankt Vith	Toyota GT86 Cup	271	(Belgium) Pierre Castelein	1, 5
(Belgium) Pit Lane - AMC Sankt Vith	Toyota GT86 Cup	271	(Belgium) Olivier Muytjens	2, 4–5
(Belgium) Pit Lane - AMC Sankt Vith	Toyota GT86 Cup	271	(Switzerland) Jacques Castelein	2, 5
(Belgium) Pit Lane - AMC Sankt Vith	Toyota GT86 Cup	271	(Belgium) Kurt Dujardyn	2
(Belgium) Pit Lane - AMC Sankt Vith	Toyota GT86 Cup	271	(Italy) Bruno Barbaro	4
(Belgium) Pit Lane - AMC Sankt Vith	Toyota GT86 Cup	271	(Belgium) 'Brody'	4
(Belgium) Pit Lane - AMC Sankt Vith	Toyota GT86 Cup	271	(Belgium) Jacques Derenne	4
(Germany) MSG Sinzig e.V. im ADAC	Renault Clio Cup	276	(Germany) David Nowakowski	1, 6
(Germany) MSG Sinzig e.V. im ADAC	Renault Clio Cup	276	(Germany) Philipp Eis	1
(Germany) MSG Sinzig e.V. im ADAC	Renault Clio Cup	276	(Belgium) Gilles Magnus	4, 6
(Germany) MSG Sinzig e.V. im ADAC	Renault Clio Cup	276	(Denmark) Mikkel Mac	4
(Germany) MSG Sinzig e.V. im ADAC	Renault Clio Cup	276	(Germany) Ralph Liesenfeld	4
(Germany) MSG Sinzig e.V. im ADAC	Renault Clio Cup	276	(Germany) Bernd Strenge	6
(Germany) MSG Sinzig e.V. im ADAC	Renault Clio Cup	276	(Germany) Laurin Johlen	7
(Germany) MSG Sinzig e.V. im ADAC	Renault Clio Cup	276	(Germany) Joris Primke	7
(Germany) MSG Sinzig e.V. im ADAC	Renault Clio Cup	276	(Germany) Alexander Mohr	7
	Renault Clio Cup	280	(Germany) Maximilian Weissermel	2
	Renault Clio Cup	280	(Germany) Robert Neumann	2
(Germany) Ollis Garage	Dacia Logan	281	(Germany) Yannik Lachmayer	2, 5
(Germany) Ollis Garage	Dacia Logan	281	(Germany) Juergen Bussmann	2
(Germany) Ollis Garage	Dacia Logan	281	(Germany) Michael Lachmayer	2
(Germany) Ollis Garage	Dacia Logan	281	(Germany) Oliver Kriese	4–5, 7
(Germany) Ollis Garage	Dacia Logan	281	(Germany) Harry Ohs	4
(Germany) Ollis Garage	Dacia Logan	281	(Germany) Maximilian Weissermel	7
(Germany) Ollis Garage	Dacia Logan	281	(Germany) Robert Neumann	7
(Germany) Five Speed Racing	Renault Clio Cup	282	(Germany) Tobias Overbeck	1–2
(Germany) Five Speed Racing	Renault Clio Cup	282	(Germany) Daniel Overbeck	1–2
(Germany) MSC Adenau	Renault Clio Cup	283	(Germany) Stephan Epp	1–7
(Germany) MSC Adenau	Renault Clio Cup	283	(Germany) Michael Uelwer	1, 3–7
(Germany) MSC Adenau	Renault Clio Cup	283	(Germany) Niklas Meisenzahl	2–4
(Germany) MSC Adenau	Renault Clio Cup	283	(Germany) Timo Kaatz	4–6
(Germany) MSC Adenau	Renault Clio Cup	285	(Germany) Gerrit Holthaus	1–6, 8
(Germany) MSC Adenau	Renault Clio Cup	285	(Germany) Marc Wylach	1–6, 8
(Germany) MSC Adenau	Renault Clio Cup	285	(Germany) Michael Bohrer	1–6, 8
(Germany) Novel Racing	Toyota GT86	284	(Japan) Keita Tomomune	5
(Germany) Novel Racing	Toyota GT86	284	(Japan) Kouji Obara	5
(Germany) Novel Racing	Toyota GT86	284	(Japan) Masaaki Hatano	5
(Germany) Novel Racing	Toyota GT86	284	(Japan) Itoh Masashige	5
(Germany) Novel Racing	Toyota GT86	284	(Japan) Kazuki Nakajima	6
(Germany) Novel Racing	Toyota GT86	284	(Germany) Heiko Tönges	6
(Hungary) Car Competition Racing Team	Toyota GT86 Cup	286	(Hungary) Adam Lengyel	1–7
(Hungary) Car Competition Racing Team	Toyota GT86 Cup	286	(Hungary) Bendeguz Molnar	1–7
(Germany) keeevin-racing.de	Toyota GT86 Cup	288	(Germany) Sebastian Geisel	3
(Germany) keeevin-racing.de	Toyota GT86 Cup	288	(Germany) Anton Bauer	3
(Germany) MSC Adenau	Renault Clio Cup	290	(Germany) Holger Goedicke	6
(Germany) MSC Adenau	Renault Clio Cup	290	(Switzerland) Matthias Schläppi	6
SP3T
(Germany) Max Kruse Racing	Volkswagen Golf GTI TCR	10	(Turkey) Emir Asari	All
(Germany) Max Kruse Racing	Volkswagen Golf GTI TCR	10	(United States) Andrew Engelmann	All
(Germany) Max Kruse Racing	Volkswagen Golf GTI TCR	10	(Netherlands) Tom Coronel	1
(Germany) Max Kruse Racing	Volkswagen Golf GTI TCR	10	(Germany) Benjamin Leuchter	2–3, 5
(Germany) Max Kruse Racing	Volkswagen Golf GTI TCR	10	(Switzerland) Frédéric Yerly	6–8
(Germany) Max Kruse Racing	Volkswagen Golf GTI TCR	310	(Germany) Matthias Wasel	1–5, 8
(Germany) Max Kruse Racing	Volkswagen Golf GTI TCR	310	(Switzerland) Frédéric Yerly	1–5
(Germany) Max Kruse Racing	Volkswagen Golf GTI TCR	310	(Germany) Marek Schaller	1–3
(Germany) Max Kruse Racing	Volkswagen Golf GTI TCR	310	(Germany) Heiko Hammel	8
(Germany) Max Kruse Racing	Volkswagen Golf GTI TCR	310	(Switzerland) Gustavo Xavier	8
(Germany) Max Kruse Racing	Volkswagen Golf GTI TCR	333	(Denmark) 'Peter Hansen'	5–8
(Germany) Max Kruse Racing	Volkswagen Golf GTI TCR	333	(Denmark) 'Lars Nielsen'	5–8
(Germany) Schmickler Performance powered by Ravenol	Porsche 981 GT4	212	(Germany) Carsten Knechtges	2–5
(Germany) Schmickler Performance powered by Ravenol	Porsche 981 GT4	212	(Germany) Achim Wawer	2, 4
(Germany) Schmickler Performance powered by Ravenol	Porsche 981 GT4	212	(Germany) Claudius Karch	3–5
(Germany) Schmickler Performance powered by Ravenol	Porsche 981 GT4	212	(Germany) Volker Wawer	5
(Switzerland) Autorama AG	Seat León	305	(Switzerland) Dario Stanco	2
(Switzerland) Autorama AG	Seat León	305	(Switzerland) Armando Stanco	2
(Switzerland) Autorama AG	Seat León	305	(Switzerland) Luigi Stanco	2
(Germany) asBest Racing	Seat León Cup Racer	308	(Germany) Kim Berwanger	1, 4
(Germany) asBest Racing	Seat León Cup Racer	308	(United Arab Emirates) Nadir Zuhour	1, 6
(Germany) asBest Racing	Seat León Cup Racer	308	(Germany) Jens Wulf	3–4
(Germany) asBest Racing	Seat León Cup Racer	308	(Germany) Meik Utsch	3–4
(Germany) asBest Racing	Seat León Cup Racer	308	(Germany) Sebastian Rings	3
(Germany) asBest Racing	Seat León Cup Racer	308	(Germany) Thomas Ardelt	4
(Germany) asBest Racing	Seat León Cup Racer	308	(Switzerland) Roger Vögeli	6
(Germany) asBest Racing	Seat León Cup Racer	308	(Germany) Thomas Ehrhardt	7
(Germany) asBest Racing	Seat León Cup Racer	308	(Germany) Philipp Eis	7
(Germany) asBest Racing	Seat León Cup Racer	308	(Germany) Niklas Ehrhardt	7
(Germany) MSC Sinzig	Volkswagen Golf VII	321	(Germany) Jens Wulf	2, 7
(Germany) MSC Sinzig	Volkswagen Golf VII	321	(Germany) Kim Berwanger	2
(Germany) MSC Sinzig	Volkswagen Golf VII	321	(Germany) Volker Garrn	7
(Germany) MSC Sinzig	Audi TT	331	(Germany) Rudi Speich	2, 5
(Germany) MSC Sinzig	Audi TT	331	(Germany) Arndt Hallmanns	2
(Germany) MSC Sinzig	Audi TT	331	(Germany) Peter Muggianu	5
(Germany) MSC Sinzig	Audi TT	331	(Germany) Roland Waschkau	5
SP2
SP2T
(Switzerland) Team Rallye Top	Peugeot RCZ Cup	385	(Switzerland) Max Langenegger	3–4
(Switzerland) Team Rallye Top	Peugeot RCZ Cup	385	(Switzerland) Bernhard Badertscher	3–4
SPPRO
(Japan) Toyota Gazoo Racing	Lexus LC	345	(Japan) Hiroaki Ishiura	3, 5
(Japan) Toyota Gazoo Racing	Lexus LC	345	(Japan) Tatsuya Kataoka	3, 5
(Japan) Toyota Gazoo Racing	Lexus LC	345	(Japan) Takamitsu Matsui	3
(Japan) Toyota Gazoo Racing	Lexus LC	345	(Japan) Naoya Gamou	5
AT(-G)
(Germany) Four Motors Bioconcept-Car	Porsche 911 GT3 Cup	320	(Germany) Thomas Kiefer	2, 4–5
(Germany) Four Motors Bioconcept-Car	Porsche 911 GT3 Cup	320	(Luxembourg) Charles Kauffman	2, 4–5
(Germany) Four Motors Bioconcept-Car	Porsche 911 GT3 Cup	320	(Germany) 'SMUDO'	2
(Germany) Four Motors Bioconcept-Car	Porsche 911 GT3 Cup	320	(Germany) 'Tom'	4–5
(Germany) Four Motors Bioconcept-Car	Porsche 911 GT3 Cup	320	(Germany) Oliver Sprungmann	4
(Germany) Four Motors Bioconcept-Car	Porsche 911 GT3 Cup	320	(Denmark) Henrik Bollerslev	5
(Germany) Four Motors Bioconcept-Car	Porsche 911 GT3 Cup	320	(Germany) Fabio Sacchi	5
(Germany) Four Motors Bioconcept-Car	Porsche 718 Cayman GT4 Clubsport	420	(Turkey) Ayhancan Güven	1
(Germany) Four Motors Bioconcept-Car	Porsche 718 Cayman GT4 Clubsport	420	(Germany) Laurin Heinrich	1
(Germany) Four Motors Bioconcept-Car	Porsche 718 Cayman GT4 Clubsport	420	(Germany) Matthias Beckwermert	2, 4–5, 7
(Germany) Four Motors Bioconcept-Car	Porsche 718 Cayman GT4 Clubsport	420	(Germany) Christoph Hewer	2, 4–5
(Germany) Four Motors Bioconcept-Car	Porsche 718 Cayman GT4 Clubsport	420	(Denmark) Henrik Bollerslev	2, 4
(Germany) Four Motors Bioconcept-Car	Porsche 718 Cayman GT4 Clubsport	420	(Germany) Karl Pflanz	5, 7
(Germany) Four Motors Bioconcept-Car	Porsche 718 Cayman GT4 Clubsport	420	(Switzerland) Marco Timbal	5
(Germany) Four Motors Bioconcept-Car	Porsche 718 Cayman GT4 Clubsport	420	(Switzerland) Luca Veronelli	5
(Germany) Four Motors Bioconcept-Car	Porsche 718 Cayman GT4 Clubsport	420	(Germany) Oliver Sprungmann	7
(Germany) Four Motors Bioconcept-Car	Porsche 718 Cayman GT4 Clubsport	633	(Netherlands) Larry ten Voorde	1, 6
(Germany) Four Motors Bioconcept-Car	Porsche 718 Cayman GT4 Clubsport	633	(France) Côme Ledogar	1
(Germany) Four Motors Bioconcept-Car	Porsche 718 Cayman GT4 Clubsport	633	(Germany) Karl Pflanz	2, 4, 6
(Germany) Four Motors Bioconcept-Car	Porsche 718 Cayman GT4 Clubsport	633	(Switzerland) Marco Timbal	2, 4, 7
(Germany) Four Motors Bioconcept-Car	Porsche 718 Cayman GT4 Clubsport	633	(Switzerland) Nicola Bravetti	2
(Germany) Four Motors Bioconcept-Car	Porsche 718 Cayman GT4 Clubsport	633	(Switzerland) Ivan Reggiani	4
(Germany) Four Motors Bioconcept-Car	Porsche 718 Cayman GT4 Clubsport	633	(Germany) Georg Kiefer	6
(Germany) Four Motors Bioconcept-Car	Porsche 718 Cayman GT4 Clubsport	633	(Netherlands) Maxime Oosten	7
(Germany) Four Motors Bioconcept-Car	Porsche 718 Cayman GT4 Clubsport	633	(Switzerland) Daniele Dariz	7
(Germany) Four Motors Bioconcept-Car	Porsche 718 Cayman GT4 Clubsport	633	(Germany) Laurin Heinrich	8
(Germany) Four Motors Bioconcept-Car	Porsche 718 Cayman GT4 Clubsport	633	(Switzerland) Marc Schöni	8
(Germany) Four Motors Bioconcept-Car	Porsche 718 Cayman GT4 Clubsport	633	(Germany) David Beckmann	8
(Germany) Four Motors Bioconcept-Car	BMW M2 ClubSport Racing	632	(Netherlands) Maxime Oosten	8
(Germany) Four Motors Bioconcept-Car	BMW M2 ClubSport Racing	632	(Germany) Jacqueline Kreutzpointner	8
(Germany) Four Motors Bioconcept-Car	BMW M2 ClubSport Racing	632	(Germany) Alesia Kreutzpointner	8
	Subaru BRZ RR-AT	636	(Germany) Tim Schrick	2–3, 5–6
	Subaru BRZ RR-AT	636	(Germany) Lucian Gavris	2–3, 5–6
	Ford Mustang GT	640	(Germany) Oliver Sprungmann	2, 5
	Ford Mustang GT	640	(Germany) Ralph Caba	2, 5
	Ford Mustang GT	640	(Germany) Michael Mohr	5
Entrylists:

==== NLS production cars ====
Team	Car	No.	Drivers	Events
V6
(Germany) Adrenalin Motorsport	Porsche Cayman S	396	(Germany) Lutz Marc Rühl	All
(Germany) Adrenalin Motorsport	Porsche Cayman S	396	(Germany) Christian Büllesbach	All
(Germany) Adrenalin Motorsport	Porsche Cayman S	396	(Germany) Andreas Schettler	All
(Germany) Adrenalin Motorsport	Porsche Cayman S	396	(Germany) Daniel Zils	1–5, 7–8
(Germany) Adrenalin Motorsport	Porsche Cayman S	396	(South Africa) David Perel	6
(Germany) Schmickler Performance powered by Ravenol	Porsche 911	400	(Germany) Thomas Heuchemer	2–4, 6–7
(Germany) Schmickler Performance powered by Ravenol	Porsche 911	400	(Germany) Christian Heuchemer	2–4, 6–7
(Germany) Schmickler Performance powered by Ravenol	Porsche 911	400	(Germany) Albert Egbert	2–4, 6
(Germany) Schmickler Performance powered by Ravenol	Porsche 911	400	(Germany) Sascha Kloft	4
(Germany) Giti Tire Motorsport by WS Racing	Porsche Cayman S	410	(Germany) Nils Steinberg	1
(Germany) Giti Tire Motorsport by WS Racing	Porsche Cayman S	410	(Denmark) Nicolaj Kandborg	1
(Germany) Giti Tire Motorsport by WS Racing	Porsche Cayman S	410	(Germany) Jan Ullrich	1
(Germany) Giti Tire Motorsport by WS Racing	Porsche Cayman S	410	(New Zealand) Grant Woolford	3–4
(Germany) Giti Tire Motorsport by WS Racing	Porsche Cayman S	410	(New Zealand) Grant Dalton	3–4
(Germany) Giti Tire Motorsport by WS Racing	Porsche Cayman S	410	(United Kingdom) James Breakell	4
(Germany) Giti Tire Motorsport by WS Racing	Porsche Cayman S	410	(Austria) Max Malinowski	6
(Germany) Giti Tire Motorsport by WS Racing	Porsche Cayman S	410	(France) Laurent Laparra	6
(Germany) Giti Tire Motorsport by WS Racing	Porsche Cayman S	410	(France) Grégoire Boutonnet	6
	Porsche 911	411	(Germany) Sebastian Rings	2, 4
	Porsche 911	411	(Germany) Alexander Köppen	2, 4
	Porsche 911	411	(Germany) Jacek Pydys	2, 4
(Germany) Team Sorg Rennsport	Porsche Cayman S	414	(Monaco) Xavier Lamadrid	2
(Germany) Team Sorg Rennsport	Porsche Cayman S	414	(Sweden) Hans Lindbohm	2
(Germany) Team Sorg Rennsport	Porsche Cayman S	414	(France) Fabrice Reicher	2
(Germany) Team Sorg Rennsport	Porsche Cayman S	418	(Estonia) Martin Rump	1
(Germany) Team Sorg Rennsport	Porsche Cayman S	418	(Germany) Nicolas Griebner	1
(Germany) Team Sorg Rennsport	Porsche Cayman S	418	(Germany) Philipp Hagnauer	1
(Germany) Team Sorg Rennsport	Porsche Cayman S	418	(Germany) Cesar Mendieta	2, 6, 8
(Germany) Team Sorg Rennsport	Porsche Cayman S	418	(United States) Michael Kovac	2
(Germany) Team Sorg Rennsport	Porsche Cayman S	418	(Switzerland) Caryl Frisché	2
(Germany) Team Sorg Rennsport	Porsche Cayman S	418	(Denmark) Nicolaj Kandborg	3–4, 6
(Germany) Team Sorg Rennsport	Porsche Cayman S	418	(Denmark) Rasmus Helmich	3, 5
(Germany) Team Sorg Rennsport	Porsche Cayman S	418	(Germany) Michael Flehmer	3
(Germany) Team Sorg Rennsport	Porsche Cayman S	418	(Germany) Harald Rettich	4–5
(Germany) Team Sorg Rennsport	Porsche Cayman S	418	(Mexico) Hector Escamilla	4
(Germany) Team Sorg Rennsport	Porsche Cayman S	418	(Mexico) Luis Ramirez	4
(Germany) Team Sorg Rennsport	Porsche Cayman S	418	(Sweden) Andreas Andersson	5–6, 8
(Germany) Team Sorg Rennsport	Porsche Cayman S	418	(France) Fabrice Reicher	5
(Germany) Team Sorg Rennsport	Porsche Cayman S	418	(France) Loel le Bihan	5
(Germany) Team Sorg Rennsport	Porsche Cayman S	418	(Germany) Philip Schauerte	6
(Germany) Team Sorg Rennsport	Porsche Cayman S	418	(Germany) Hans Joachim Theiß	8
(Germany) Team Sorg Rennsport	Porsche Cayman S	418	(Italy) Ugo Vicenzi	8
	Porsche 991	415	(Germany) Anna Lena Binkowska	2
	Porsche 991	415	(Germany) David Binkowska	2
	Porsche 991	415	(Germany) Dietmar Binkowska	2
(Germany) Team Mathol Racing e.V.	Porsche Cayman R	434	(India) Arjun Maini	2
(Germany) Team Mathol Racing e.V.	Porsche Cayman R	434	(Poland) Franz Dziwok Blizyn	2
(Germany) Team Mathol Racing e.V.	Porsche Cayman R	434	(United Kingdom) Peter Cate	2
V5
(Germany) PROsport Racing	Porsche Cayman	437	(Norway) Emil Heyerdahl	1–2
(Germany) PROsport Racing	Porsche Cayman	437	(Germany) Ulf Schmidt	1
(Germany) PROsport Racing	Porsche Cayman	437	(Saudi Arabia) Reema Juffali	2
(Germany) PROsport Racing	Porsche Cayman	437	(Germany) Hugo Sasse	5–6, 8
(Germany) PROsport Racing	Porsche Cayman	437	(Ukraine) Ivan Peklin	5, 8
(Germany) PROsport Racing	Porsche Cayman	437	(Belgium) Alexander Hommerson	5
(Germany) PROsport Racing	Porsche Cayman	437	(Czech Republic) Gabriela Jílková	6, 8
(Germany) PROsport Racing	Porsche Cayman	437	(Belgium) Niek Hommerson	6
(Germany) QTQ-Raceperformance	Porsche Cayman	440	(Germany) Tassilo Zumpe	1–4, 6
(Germany) QTQ-Raceperformance	Porsche Cayman	440	(Germany) Andreas Eckert	1, 3–6, 8
(Germany) QTQ-Raceperformance	Porsche Cayman	440	(Germany) Jürgen Huber	1
(Germany) QTQ-Raceperformance	Porsche Cayman	440	(Sweden) Andreas Andersson	2–3
(Germany) QTQ-Raceperformance	Porsche Cayman	440	(Germany) Theodor Devolescu	5–6
(Germany) QTQ-Raceperformance	Porsche Cayman	440	(Germany) Maximilian Kurz	5, 8
(Germany) QTQ-Raceperformance	Porsche Cayman	440	(Germany) Florian Quante	8
(Germany) Adrenalin Motorsport	Porsche Cayman	444	(Germany) Ulrich Korn	All
(Germany) Adrenalin Motorsport	Porsche Cayman	444	(Germany) Tobias Korn	All
(Germany) Adrenalin Motorsport	Porsche Cayman	444	(Germany) Daniel Korn	All
(Germany) Adrenalin Motorsport	Porsche Cayman	444	(Spain) Carlos Arimón Solivellas	2, 4–5
(Germany) Adrenalin Motorsport	Porsche Cayman	444	(Germany) Nils Steinberg	7
(Germany) MSC Adenau	Porsche Cayman	445	(Germany) Holger Gachot	1–2, 5, 8
(Germany) MSC Adenau	Porsche Cayman	445	(Germany) Finn Albig	1–2
(Germany) MSC Adenau	Porsche Cayman	445	(Germany) Sophia Gachot	1, 3, 5
(Germany) MSC Adenau	Porsche Cayman	445	(Italy) Aleardo Bertelli	2, 4, 8
(Germany) MSC Adenau	Porsche Cayman	445	(Italy) Stefano Croci	2, 4, 8
(Germany) MSC Adenau	Porsche Cayman	445	(Germany) Jérôme Larbi	3–5
(Germany) MSC Adenau	Porsche Cayman	445	(Germany) Reiner Neuffer	3
(Germany) MSC Adenau	Porsche Cayman	445	(Italy) Graziano Grazzini	4
(Germany) MSC Adenau	Porsche Cayman	445	(Germany) Stefan Müller	5
	Porsche Cayman	454	(Germany) Christoph Ruhrmann	3
	Porsche Cayman	454	(Germany) Manfred Weber	3
	Porsche Cayman	454	(Germany) Frank Nikolaus	3
(Germany) KRS Motorsport	Porsche Cayman	455	(Switzerland) Daniele Dariz	6
(Germany) KRS Motorsport	Porsche Cayman	455	(Germany) Stefano Specht	6
(Germany) KRS Motorsport	Porsche Cayman	455	(Denmark) Kaj Schubert	7–8
(Germany) KRS Motorsport	Porsche Cayman	455	(Germany) Andreas Ecker	7
(Germany) KRS Motorsport	Porsche Cayman	455	(Germany) Levi O'Dey	8
(Germany) KRS Motorsport	Porsche Cayman	456	(Denmark) Kaj Schubert	All
(Germany) KRS Motorsport	Porsche Cayman	456	(Denmark) Lucas Daugaard	All
(Germany) W&S Motorsport	Porsche Cayman	460	(Germany) Kevin Rembert	All
(Germany) W&S Motorsport	Porsche Cayman	460	(Germany) Nicals Wiedmann	All
(Germany) W&S Motorsport	Porsche Cayman	460	(Germany) Dirk Biermann	1–4, 7
(Germany) W&S Motorsport	Porsche Cayman	460	(Germany) Finn Zulauf	5–6
V4
(Germany) Adrenalin Motorsport	BMW 325i	1	(Germany) Philipp Leisen	1–4, 6–7
(Germany) Adrenalin Motorsport	BMW 325i	1	(Germany) Oliver Frisse	1–4, 6–7
(Germany) Adrenalin Motorsport	BMW 325i	1	(Germany) Jacob Erlbacher	1–4, 6–7
(Germany) EiFelkind Racing	BMW 325i	701	(Germany) Dominic Kulpowicz	1–2, 4–5
(Germany) EiFelkind Racing	BMW 325i	701	(Germany) Kevin Wambach	1–2, 5
(Germany) EiFelkind Racing	BMW 325i	701	(Germany) Peter Elkmann	1–2
(Germany) EiFelkind Racing	BMW 325i	701	(Germany) Benno Zerlin	4–5, 7
(Germany) EiFelkind Racing	BMW 325i	701	(Germany) Frank Steinmeier	4
(Germany) EiFelkind Racing	BMW 325i	701	(Germany) Robin Falkenbach	5
	BMW 325i	702	(Germany) Reiner Thomas	1–2, 4, 6
	BMW 325i	702	(Germany) Manfred Schmitz	1–2, 4, 6
	BMW 325i	702	(Germany) Katja Thomas	4
(Germany) QTQ-Raceperformance	BMW 325i	703	(Germany) Jürgen Huber	4
(Germany) QTQ-Raceperformance	BMW 325i	703	(Germany) Stephan Köpple	4
(Germany) QTQ-Raceperformance	BMW 325i	703	(Germany) Simon Sagmeister	4
(Germany) Manheller Racing	BMW 325i	710	(Germany) Matthias Röss	4, 6
(Germany) Manheller Racing	BMW 325i	710	(Germany) Malte Tack	4, 6
(Germany) Manheller Racing	BMW 325i	710	(Germany) Manfred Röss	4
(Germany) MSG Bayerischer Wald Hutthurm e.V. im ADAC	BMW 325i	712	(Germany) Christian Schotte	8
(Germany) MSG Bayerischer Wald Hutthurm e.V. im ADAC	BMW 325i	712	(Germany) Laurin Johlen	8
	BMW 325i	725	(Germany) Marcel Geilen	2–4
	BMW 325i	725	(Germany) Thomas Geilen	2–4
	BMW 325i	729	(Germany) Markus Müller	6
	BMW 325i	729	(Germany) Kai Kording	6
	BMW 325i	729	(Germany) Nico Möller	6
(Germany) MSC Wahlscheid keevin-racing.de	BMW 325i	730	(Finland) Juha Miettinen	All
(Germany) MSC Wahlscheid keevin-racing.de	BMW 325i	730	(Sweden) Dan Berghult	All
(Germany) MSC Wahlscheid keevin-racing.de	BMW 325i	730	(Germany) Frank Blass	2
	BMW 325i	731	(Germany) Sebastian Rings	1
	BMW 325i	731	(Germany) Lukas Pickard	1
	BMW i390	732	(Finland) Konsta Lappalainen	1
	BMW i390	732	(United States) Jaden Conwright	1
(Germany) Dr. Dr. Stein Tveten Motorsport	BMW 325i	733	(Germany) Dr. Dr. Stein Tveten	1–4
(Germany) Dr. Dr. Stein Tveten Motorsport	BMW 325i	733	(France) Gregoire Boutonnet	1
(Germany) Dr. Dr. Stein Tveten Motorsport	BMW 325i	733	(France) Laurent Laparra	1
(Germany) Dr. Dr. Stein Tveten Motorsport	BMW 325i	733	(Germany) Maximilian von Görtz	4
	BMW 325i	735	(Germany) Manuel Dormagen	2, 4, 6
	BMW 325i	735	(Germany) Sven Oepen	2, 4, 6
	BMW 325i	750	(United Kingdom) Matt Hampson	3
	BMW 325i	750	(United Kingdom) Andy Schulz	3
	BMW 325i	750	(United Kingdom) Phil Cutts	3
	BMW E90	755	(Germany) Marc Riebel	2
	BMW E90	755	(Germany) Fabio Sacchi	2
	BMW E90	755	(Netherlands) Max de Bruijn	2
V3
	BMW E87	521	(United Kingdom) Matt Hampson	2
	BMW E87	521	(United Kingdom) Andy Schulz	2
	BMW E87	521	(United Kingdom) Phil Cutts	2
VT3
(Germany) PROsport Racing	Porsche Cayman	471	(Belgium) Simon Balcaen	1–2
(Germany) PROsport Racing	Porsche Cayman	471	(Belgium) Guillaume Dumarey	1
(Germany) PROsport Racing	Porsche Cayman	471	(Belgium) Didier Glorieux	2
(Germany) MSC Adenau	Porsche Cayman S	472	(Sweden) Eric Ullström	5
(Germany) MSC Adenau	Porsche Cayman S	472	(Germany) Arno Klasen	5
(Germany) Team Mathol Racing e.V.	Porsche 718 Cayman S	474	(Poland) Franz Dziwok	1–2
(Germany) Team Mathol Racing e.V.	Porsche 718 Cayman S	474	(Germany) Erik Braun	1, 3–5
(Germany) Team Mathol Racing e.V.	Porsche 718 Cayman S	474	(Germany) Jörg Kittelmann	1
(Germany) Team Mathol Racing e.V.	Porsche 718 Cayman S	474	(Argentina) Marcos Adolfo Vazquez	2, 5–8
(Germany) Team Mathol Racing e.V.	Porsche 718 Cayman S	474	(India) Arjun Maini	2
(Germany) Team Mathol Racing e.V.	Porsche 718 Cayman S	474	(Germany) Arvid Thal	3, 6
(Germany) Team Mathol Racing e.V.	Porsche 718 Cayman S	474	(Canada) Mikaël Grenier	4–5
(Germany) Team Mathol Racing e.V.	Porsche 718 Cayman S	474	(Germany) Jannes Fittje	4, 7
(Germany) Team Mathol Racing e.V.	Porsche 718 Cayman S	474	(Argentina) Roberto "Coco" Falcón	5, 8
(Germany) Team Mathol Racing e.V.	Porsche 718 Cayman S	474	(Germany) Matthias Trinius	5
(Germany) Team Mathol Racing e.V.	Porsche 718 Cayman S	474	(Argentina) Nicolás Varrone	6–8
VT2 FWD
	Hyundai i30N Performance	481	(United Kingdom) Alex Wright	7–8
	Hyundai i30N Performance	481	(Netherlands) Piet-Jan Ooms	7–8
	Hyundai i30N Performance	481	(Germany) Wolfgang Haugg	7
	Hyundai i30N Performance	481	(Germany) Lorenz Stegmann	8
	Hyundai i30N Performance	481	(Argentina) Nicolás Varrone	8
	Volkswagen Golf V GTI	483	(Germany) Thomas Ehrhardt	2–3
	Volkswagen Golf V GTI	483	(Germany) Niklas Ehrhardt	2–3
	Volkswagen Golf V GTI	483	(Germany) Peter Elkmann	2
	Volkswagen Golf V GTI	483	(Germany) Philipp Eis	3
	Volkswagen Golf V GTI	483	(Germany) Maximilian Weissermel	4, 8
	Volkswagen Golf V GTI	483	(Germany) Robert Neumann	4, 8
	Volkswagen Golf V GTI	483	(Germany) Christoph Kragenings	6–8
	Volkswagen Golf V GTI	483	(Germany) Dennis Leißing	6–7
(Germany) MSC Adenau	Renault Mégane III RS	484	(Germany) David Ackermann	1–4, 6, 8
(Germany) MSC Adenau	Renault Mégane III RS	484	(Italy) Aleardo Bertelli	1, 6
(Germany) MSC Adenau	Renault Mégane III RS	484	(Italy) Stefano Croci	1, 6
(Germany) MSC Adenau	Renault Mégane III RS	484	(Italy) Graziano Grazzini	1, 6
(Germany) MSC Adenau	Renault Mégane III RS	484	(Germany) Finn Albig	2
(Germany) MSC Adenau	Renault Mégane III RS	484	(Germany) Holger Gachot	3–4
(Germany) MSC Adenau	Renault Mégane III RS	484	(Germany) Philip Ade	3
(Germany) MSC Adenau	Renault Mégane III RS	484	(Germany) "Moritz"	4, 8
(Germany) MSC Adenau	Renault Mégane III RS	484	(Germany) Dirk Vleugels	4
(Germany) MSC Adenau	Renault Mégane III RS	484	(Germany) Oliver Greven	8
(Germany) AvD e.V.	Opel Astra J OPC	485	(Germany) Lena Strycek	5
(Germany) AvD e.V.	Opel Astra J OPC	485	(Germany) Robin Strycek	5
(Germany) AvD e.V.	Opel Astra J OPC	485	(Germany) Volker Strycek	5
(Germany) Team Sorg Rennsport	BMW 128ti	488	(South Africa) Jonathan Aberdein	1
(Germany) Team Sorg Rennsport	BMW 128ti	488	(Germany) Jannes Fittje	1
(Germany) Team Sorg Rennsport	BMW 128ti	488	(Finland) Elias Seppänen	1
(Germany) Team Sorg Rennsport	BMW 128ti	488	(Austria) Bernhard Wagner	2, 8
(Germany) Team Sorg Rennsport	BMW 128ti	488	(Germany) Leon Köhler	2
(Germany) Team Sorg Rennsport	BMW 128ti	488	(Germany) Florian Krüger	2
(Germany) Team Sorg Rennsport	BMW 128ti	488	(South Korea) Roelof Bruins	4, 6
(Germany) Team Sorg Rennsport	BMW 128ti	488	(Canada) Steven Cho	4, 6
(Germany) Team Sorg Rennsport	BMW 128ti	488	(South Korea) Jongkyum Kim	4, 6
(Germany) Team Sorg Rennsport	BMW 128ti	488	(Germany) Heiko Eichenberg	8
(Germany) Team Sorg Rennsport	BMW 128ti	488	(Germany) Björn Simon	8
(Germany) Team Sorg Rennsport	BMW 128ti	488	(Germany) Niklas Bendfeldt	8
(Germany) mathilda racing - Team LAVO Carwash	Volkswagen Scirocco R N24	489	(Germany) Felix Schumann	5–8
(Germany) mathilda racing - Team LAVO Carwash	Volkswagen Scirocco R N24	489	(Germany) Timo Hochwind	5
(Germany) mathilda racing - Team LAVO Carwash	Volkswagen Scirocco R N24	489	(Germany) Jan Marschalkowsk	5
(Germany) mathilda racing - Team LAVO Carwash	Volkswagen Scirocco R N24	489	(Germany) Michael Paatz	6–8
(Germany) mathilda racing - Team LAVO Carwash	Volkswagen Scirocco R N24	497	(Germany) Felix Schumann	1–3
(Germany) mathilda racing - Team LAVO Carwash	Volkswagen Scirocco R N24	497	(Germany) Michael Paatz	1–3
(Germany) mathilda racing - Team LAVO Carwash	Volkswagen Scirocco R N24	497	(Germany) Timo Hochwind	1–3
(Germany) mathilda racing - Team LAVO Carwash	Volkswagen Scirocco R N24	498	(Germany) Timo Beuth	All
(Germany) mathilda racing - Team LAVO Carwash	Volkswagen Scirocco R N24	498	(Italy) Benjamin Cartery	All
(Germany) mathilda racing - Team LAVO Carwash	Volkswagen Scirocco R N24	498	(Germany) Felix Schumann	4
(Germany) mathilda racing - Team LAVO Carwash	Volkswagen Scirocco R N24	498	(Germany) Timo Hochwind	4
(Germany) mathilda racing - Team LAVO Carwash	Volkswagen Scirocco R N24	498	(Germany) Jan Marschalkowsk	5
(Germany) Giti Tire Motorsport by WS Racing	Volkswagen Golf AU	490	(Germany) Axel Jahn	1–7
(Germany) Giti Tire Motorsport by WS Racing	Volkswagen Golf AU	490	(Germany) Robert Hinzer	1–5, 7
(Germany) Giti Tire Motorsport by WS Racing	Volkswagen Golf AU	490	(Germany) Andrei Sidorenko	1, 5–7
(Germany) Giti Tire Motorsport by WS Racing	Volkswagen Golf AU	490	(Germany) Ulrich Schmidt	2–4, 6, 8
(Germany) Giti Tire Motorsport by WS Racing	Volkswagen Golf AU	490	(Germany) Niklas Kry	4
(Germany) Giti Tire Motorsport by WS Racing	Volkswagen Golf AU	490	(Germany) Stephan Schroers	5
(Germany) Giti Tire Motorsport by WS Racing	Volkswagen Golf AU	490	(Germany) Matthias Lehnert	8
(Germany) Druckregelt & Wappler by Mertens Motorsport	Hyundai i30 N	491	(Germany) Daniel Mertens	3–8
(Germany) Druckregelt & Wappler by Mertens Motorsport	Hyundai i30 N	491	(Germany) Kurt Strube	3–6
(Germany) Druckregelt & Wappler by Mertens Motorsport	Hyundai i30 N	491	(United States) Jeffrey Robert Ricca	5
(Germany) Druckregelt & Wappler by Mertens Motorsport	Hyundai i30 Fastback N	496	(Germany) Daniel Mertens	1
(Germany) Druckregelt & Wappler by Mertens Motorsport	Hyundai i30 Fastback N	496	(Germany) Kurt Strube	1
(Germany) Druckregelt & Wappler by Mertens Motorsport	Hyundai i30 Fastback N	496	(United States) Jeffrey Robert Ricca	1
(Germany) Waldow Performance	Renault Mégane IV RS	492	(Luxembourg) John Marechal	1–4, 6
(Germany) Waldow Performance	Renault Mégane IV RS	492	(Germany) Bernhard Sax	1–2, 4
(Germany) Waldow Performance	Renault Mégane IV RS	492	(Luxembourg) Max Lamesch	1–2
(Germany) Waldow Performance	Renault Mégane IV RS	492	(Germany) Martin Brennecke	3
(Germany) Waldow Performance	Renault Mégane IV RS	492	(Germany) Joris Primke	6
(Germany) Waldow Performance	Renault Mégane III RS	493	(Germany) Ralf Wiesner	All
(Germany) Waldow Performance	Renault Mégane III RS	493	(Germany) Carsten Erpenbach	All
(Germany) Waldow Performance	Renault Mégane III RS	493	(Germany) Janis Waldow	1–2
(Germany) Waldow Performance	Renault Mégane III RS	493	(Luxembourg) John Marechal	5
(Germany) Waldow Performance	Renault Mégane III RS	493	(Germany) Bernhard Sax	5
(Germany) Jung Motorsport	Opel Astra OPC Cup	494	(Germany) Tobias Jung	1–7
(Germany) Jung Motorsport	Opel Astra OPC Cup	494	(Germany) Michael Eichhorn	1–2, 4–6
(Germany) Jung Motorsport	Opel Astra OPC Cup	494	(Germany) Andre Kern	2–3, 7
(Germany) Jung Motorsport	Opel Astra OPC Cup	494	(France) Jean-Marc Finot	2
(Germany) Jung Motorsport	Opel Astra OPC Cup	494	(United States) Tony Roma	4–5, 7
(Germany) Jung Motorsport	Opel Astra OPC Cup	494	(Germany) Andreas Winterwerber	4–5
(Germany) Jung Motorsport	Opel Astra OPC Cup	494	(Austria) Daniel Jenichen	5–6
(Germany) Jung Motorsport	Opel Astra OPC Cup	495	(France) Jean-Marc Finot	2
(Germany) Jung Motorsport	Opel Astra OPC Cup	495	(Germany) Tim Robertz	2
(Germany) Jung Motorsport	Opel Astra OPC Cup	495	(Germany) Volker Strycek	2
(Germany) Jung Motorsport	Opel Astra OPC Cup	495	(Germany) Tobias Jung	7
(Germany) Jung Motorsport	Opel Astra OPC Cup	495	(Germany) Lars Füting	7
(Germany) Jung Motorsport	Opel Astra OPC Cup	495	(United States) Tony Roma	7
(Germany) MSC Wahlscheid keeevin-racing.de	Renault Mégane III RS	499	(Germany) Olaf Hoppelshäuser	1–2
(Germany) MSC Wahlscheid keeevin-racing.de	Renault Mégane III RS	499	(Germany) Daniel Karl	1
(Germany) MSC Wahlscheid keeevin-racing.de	Renault Mégane III RS	499	(Germany) Christian Knaus	1
(Germany) MSC Wahlscheid keeevin-racing.de	Renault Mégane III RS	499	(United States) Cabell Fisher	2
(Germany) MSC Wahlscheid keeevin-racing.de	Renault Mégane III RS	499	(Germany) Christian Albinger	3
(Germany) MSC Wahlscheid keeevin-racing.de	Renault Mégane III RS	499	(Germany) Thomas Plum	3
VT2 R+4
(Germany) Adrenalin Motorsport	BMW 330i Racing (2020)	500	(Germany) Daniel Zils	All
(Germany) Adrenalin Motorsport	BMW 330i Racing (2020)	500	(Norway) Oskar Sandberg	All
(Germany) Adrenalin Motorsport	BMW 330i Racing (2020)	500	(Norway) Sindre Setsaas	All
(Germany) Adrenalin Motorsport	BMW 330i Racing (2020)	501	(Australia) Caitlin Wood	1–2
(Germany) Adrenalin Motorsport	BMW 330i Racing (2020)	501	(United Kingdom) Alex Toth-Jones	1, 3
(Germany) Adrenalin Motorsport	BMW 330i Racing (2020)	501	(Germany) Julian Hanses	1
(Germany) Adrenalin Motorsport	BMW 330i Racing (2020)	501	(Germany) Nils Steinberg	2–4
(Germany) Adrenalin Motorsport	BMW 330i Racing (2020)	501	(Germany) Moritz Oehme	2
(Germany) Adrenalin Motorsport	BMW 330i Racing (2020)	501	(Germany) Andreas Schmidt	3–4
(Germany) Adrenalin Motorsport	BMW 330i Racing (2020)	501	(Luxembourg) Charles Oakes	4
(Germany) Adrenalin Motorsport	BMW 330i Racing (2020)	501	(Germany) Julian Hanses	4
(Germany) Adrenalin Motorsport	BMW 330i Racing (2020)	501	(Germany) Philipp Leisen	5
(Germany) Adrenalin Motorsport	BMW 330i Racing (2020)	501	(Germany) Oliver Frisse	5
(Germany) Adrenalin Motorsport	BMW 330i Racing (2020)	501	(Germany) Jacob Erlbacher	5
(Germany) Adrenalin Motorsport	BMW 330i Racing (2020)	501	(Germany) Benjamin Goethe	6–8
(Germany) Adrenalin Motorsport	BMW 330i Racing (2020)	501	(Austria) Ferdinand Habsburg	6, 8
(Germany) Adrenalin Motorsport	BMW 330i Racing (2020)	501	(Belgium) Charles Weerts	7–8
(Germany) Adrenalin Motorsport	BMW 330i Racing (2020)	501	(Austria) Markus Flasch	7
(Germany) Adrenalin Motorsport	BMW 330i Racing (2020)	501	(France) Jean-Baptiste Simmenauer	8
(Germany) Giti Tire Motorsport by WS Racing	BMW 328i Racing	502	(Germany) Matthias Möller	1–5
(Germany) Giti Tire Motorsport by WS Racing	BMW 328i Racing	502	(Germany) Fabian Pirrone	1–5
(Germany) Giti Tire Motorsport by WS Racing	BMW 328i Racing	502	(Germany) Detlef Stelbrink	1–2, 5
(Germany) Giti Tire Motorsport by WS Racing	BMW 328i Racing	502	(Australia) Caitlin Wood	5
(Germany) Giti Tire Motorsport by WS Racing	BMW 125i	512	(Germany) Matthias Möller	8
(Germany) Giti Tire Motorsport by WS Racing	BMW 125i	512	(Germany) Fabian Pirrone	8
(Germany) Team Sorg Rennsport	BMW 330i Racing (2020)	504	(Germany) Björn Simon	All
(Germany) Team Sorg Rennsport	BMW 330i Racing (2020)	504	(Italy) Edoardo Bugane	All
(Germany) Team Sorg Rennsport	BMW 330i Racing (2020)	504	(United Kingdom) Moran Gott	All
(Germany) Team Sorg Rennsport	BMW 330i Racing (2020)	504	(New Zealand) Brendon Leitch	4
(Germany) Team Sorg Rennsport	BMW 330i Racing (2020)	504	(Italy) Francesco Bugane	5
(Germany) Team Sorg Rennsport	BMW 330i Racing (2020)	514	(Germany) Hans Joachim Theiß	All
(Germany) Team Sorg Rennsport	BMW 330i Racing (2020)	514	(United States) Robert Mau	1–5
(Germany) Team Sorg Rennsport	BMW 330i Racing (2020)	514	(United States) Christopher Allen	1–5
(Germany) Team Sorg Rennsport	BMW 330i Racing (2020)	514	(United States) Jonathan Miller	4
(Germany) Team Sorg Rennsport	BMW 330i Racing (2020)	514	(United States) Jason Griscavage	5
(Germany) Team Sorg Rennsport	BMW 330i Racing (2020)	514	(New Zealand) Brendon Leitch	6–7
(Germany) Team Sorg Rennsport	BMW 330i Racing (2020)	514	(United Kingdom) Sam Neary	6
(Germany) Team Sorg Rennsport	BMW 330i Racing (2020)	514	(Germany) Florian Krüger	8
(Germany) Team Sorg Rennsport	BMW 330i Racing (2020)	514	(Germany) Julius Meinhardt	8
(Germany) Team Sorg Rennsport	BMW 330i Racing (2020)	524	(United Kingdom) Casper Stevenson	1
(Germany) Team Sorg Rennsport	BMW 330i Racing (2020)	524	(Denmark) Frederik Schandorff	1
(Germany) Team Sorg Rennsport	BMW 330i Racing (2020)	524	(United States) Michael Dayton	2
(Germany) Team Sorg Rennsport	BMW 330i Racing (2020)	524	(United States) Robert Grace	2
(Germany) Team Sorg Rennsport	BMW 330i Racing (2020)	524	(United States) Jason Griscavage	2
(Germany) Team Sorg Rennsport	BMW 330i Racing (2020)	524	(United States) Simon Tibbett	3, 5
(Germany) Team Sorg Rennsport	BMW 330i Racing (2020)	524	(Austria) Bernhard Wagner	3, 5
(Germany) Team Sorg Rennsport	BMW 330i Racing (2020)	524	(Germany) Florian Krüger	3
(Germany) Team Sorg Rennsport	BMW 330i Racing (2020)	524	(United Kingdom) Frank Bird	4
(Germany) Team Sorg Rennsport	BMW 330i Racing (2020)	524	(Denmark) Nicolai Kjærgaard	4
(Germany) Team Sorg Rennsport	BMW 330i Racing (2020)	524	(Finland) Elias Seppänen	4
(Germany) Team Sorg Rennsport	BMW 330i Racing (2020)	524	(Germany) Sebastian Pokutta	4
(Germany) Team Sorg Rennsport	BMW 330i Racing (2020)	524	(Germany) Niklas Bendfeldt	5
(Germany) Team Sorg Rennsport	BMW 330i Racing (2020)	524	(Germany) Michael Flehmer	5
(Germany) Team Sorg Rennsport	BMW 330i Racing (2020)	524	(South Korea) Kichul Song	6
(Germany) Team Sorg Rennsport	BMW 330i Racing (2020)	524	(South Korea) Jeongmin An	6
(Germany) QTQ-Raceperformance	BMW 330i Racing (2020)	505	(Germany) Maximilian Kurz	1–4, 6
(Germany) QTQ-Raceperformance	BMW 330i Racing (2020)	505	(Germany) Florian Quante	1–3
(Germany) QTQ-Raceperformance	BMW 330i Racing (2020)	505	(Switzerland) Roland Schmid	1–2, 4
(Germany) QTQ-Raceperformance	BMW 330i Racing (2020)	505	(Germany) Philip Schauerte	2–3
(Germany) QTQ-Raceperformance	BMW 330i Racing (2020)	505	(Germany) Robert Haub	4
(Germany) QTQ-Raceperformance	BMW 330i Racing (2020)	505	(Czech Republic) Gabriela Jílková	4
(Germany) QTQ-Raceperformance	BMW 330i Racing (2020)	505	(Germany) Fritz Hebig	6
(Germany) QTQ-Raceperformance	BMW 330i Racing (2020)	505	(Germany) Anton Huber	6
(Germany) QTQ-Raceperformance	BMW 330i Racing (2020)	506	(Germany) Christian Knötschke	1–2, 4–5
(Germany) QTQ-Raceperformance	BMW 330i Racing (2020)	506	(Germany) Uwe Falkowski	1–2, 5
(Germany) QTQ-Raceperformance	BMW 330i Racing (2020)	506	(Germany) Phil Dörr	1
(Germany) QTQ-Raceperformance	BMW 330i Racing (2020)	506	(Germany) Reiner Neuffer	2, 4–5
(Germany) QTQ-Raceperformance	BMW 330i Racing (2020)	506	(Germany) Andreas Schmidt	5
	BMW 328i Racing	507	(Germany) Stefan Floeck	1
	BMW 328i Racing	507	(United States) Cabell Fisher	1
(Germany) MSC Adenau	BMW 3L	508	(Germany) Beat Schmitz	4, 6–8
(Germany) MSC Adenau	BMW 3L	508	(Germany) Andre Sommerberg	4, 6–8
(Germany) MSC Adenau	BMW 3L	508	(Germany) Marcel Manheller	4, 8
(Germany) Manheller Racing	BMW F30	510	(Germany) Harald Barth	3–4, 6
(Germany) Manheller Racing	BMW F30	510	(Germany) Marcel Manheller	3–4, 7–8
(Germany) Manheller Racing	BMW F30	510	(Germany) Marco Zabel	4
(Germany) Manheller Racing	BMW F30	510	(Argentina) Jorge Alberto Cersosimo	5
(Germany) Manheller Racing	BMW F30	510	(Argentina) Carlos Federico Braga	5
(Germany) Manheller Racing	BMW F30	510	(Argentina) Alejandro Walter Chahwan	5
(Germany) Manheller Racing	BMW F30	510	(Argentina) Andres Bruno Josephsohn	5
(Germany) Manheller Racing	BMW F30	510	(United Kingdom) Martin Owen	6
(Germany) Manheller Racing	BMW F30	510	(Japan) Yutaka Seki	7
(Germany) Manheller Racing	BMW F30	510	(Germany) Maximilian von Görtz	8
(Germany) FK Performance Motorsport	BMW 330i Racing (2020)	511	(Germany) Danny Brink	1–8
(Germany) FK Performance Motorsport	BMW 330i Racing (2020)	511	(Germany) Christian Konnerth	1–8
(Germany) FK Performance Motorsport	BMW 330i Racing (2020)	511	(Switzerland) Ranko Mijatovic	1–8
(Germany) FK Performance Motorsport	BMW 330i Racing (2020)	511	(Germany) Moritz Oberheim	5
(Germany) Toyo Tires with Ring Racing	Toyota Supra	519	(Japan) Kazuki Nakajima	8
(Germany) Toyo Tires with Ring Racing	Toyota Supra	519	(Germany) Uwe Kleen	8
(Germany) MSG Bayerischer Wald Hutthurm e.V. im ADAC	BMW F30	520	(Romania) Alexandru Vasilescu	5, 8
(Germany) MSG Bayerischer Wald Hutthurm e.V. im ADAC	BMW F30	520	(Romania) Mihnea Birisan	5, 8
(Germany) MSG Bayerischer Wald Hutthurm e.V. im ADAC	BMW F30	520	(Germany) Christian Schotte	5
(Germany) MSG Bayerischer Wald Hutthurm e.V. im ADAC	BMW F30	520	(United Kingdom) Martin Owen	5
(Germany) MSG Bayerischer Wald Hutthurm e.V. im ADAC	BMW F30	520	(Romania) Sergiu Nicolae	8
VT1
VT Hybrid
VT Elektro
Entrylists:

==== Gruppe H historic cars ====
Team	Car	No.	Drivers	Events
H4
	BMW M3 E92 GTR	600	(Germany) 'Moritz'	3, 5
	BMW M3 E92 GTR	600	(Germany) David Ackermann	3, 5
	BMW M3 E92 GTR	600	(Germany) Jörg Wiskirchen	5
	BMW M3 E92 GTR	600	(Germany) Dirk Vleugels	5
	BMW M3 E92 GTR II	601	(Germany) 'Moritz'	7
	BMW M3 E92 GTR II	601	(Germany) David Ackermann	7
(Switzerland) Hofor-Racing	BMW M3 E46 CSL	602	(Switzerland) Chantal Prinz	6–7
(Switzerland) Hofor-Racing	BMW M3 E46 CSL	602	(Switzerland) Alexander Prinz	6–7
(Switzerland) Hofor-Racing	BMW M3 E46 CSL	602	(Switzerland) Michael Kroll	7
(Switzerland) Hofor-Racing	BMW M3 E46 CSL	602	(Switzerland) Martin Kroll	7
(Switzerland) Hofor-Racing	BMW M3 E46 GTR	605	(Switzerland) Michael Kroll	2–4, 6–7
(Switzerland) Hofor-Racing	BMW M3 E46 GTR	605	(Switzerland) Alexander Prinz	2–4, 7
(Switzerland) Hofor-Racing	BMW M3 E46 GTR	605	(Switzerland) Chantal Prinz	2–3, 7
(Switzerland) Hofor-Racing	BMW M3 E46 GTR	605	(Switzerland) Martin Kroll	2, 4, 6–7
(Switzerland) Hofor-Racing	BMW M3 E46 GTR	605	(Germany) Thomas Mühlenz	4
	Porsche 997 GT3 Cup	606	(Germany) Ralf Schall	8
H2
Entrylists:

==== Cup Class cars ====
Team	Car	No.	Drivers	Events
CUPX
(Germany) Teichmann Racing	KTM X-Bow GT4	912	(Germany) Lukas Drost	1–2
(Germany) Teichmann Racing	KTM X-Bow GT4	912	(Germany) Andreas Simon	1–2
(Germany) Teichmann Racing	KTM X-Bow GT4	912	(Germany) Björn Griesemann	2
(Germany) Teichmann Racing	KTM X-Bow GT4	914	(Germany) Lukas Drost	6
(Germany) Teichmann Racing	KTM X-Bow GT4	914	(Germany) Andreas Simon	6
(Germany) Teichmann Racing	KTM X-Bow GT4	914	(Germany) Stephan Brodmerkel	7
(Germany) Teichmann Racing	KTM X-Bow GT4	914	(Germany) Michael Mönch	7
(Germany) Teichmann Racing	KTM X-Bow GTX Concept	920	(Germany) Felix von der Laden	1–6
(Germany) Teichmann Racing	KTM X-Bow GTX Concept	920	(Germany) Yves Volte	1–6
(Germany) Teichmann Racing	KTM X-Bow GTX Concept	920	(Germany) Maik Rönnefarth	1–5
(Germany) Teichmann Racing	KTM X-Bow GTX Concept	920	(Germany) Georg Griesemann	1–4, 6
(Germany) Teichmann Racing	KTM X-Bow GTX Concept	927	(Germany) Stephan Brodmerkel	1–6
(Germany) Teichmann Racing	KTM X-Bow GTX Concept	927	(Austria) Constantin Schöll	1–6
(Germany) Teichmann Racing	KTM X-Bow GTX Concept	927	(Germany) Hendrik Still	1, 4–6
(Germany) Teichmann Racing	KTM X-Bow GTX Concept	927	(Austria) Laura Kraihamer	2, 4–5
(Germany) Teichmann Racing	KTM X-Bow GTX Concept	927	(Austria) Reinhard Kofler	3
(Germany) Teichmann Racing	KTM X-Bow GTX Concept	927	(Germany) Michael Grassl	5
BMW M240i
(Germany) Adrenalin Motorsport Team Alzner Automotive	BMW M240i Racing	650	(Germany) Sven Markert	All
(Germany) Adrenalin Motorsport Team Alzner Automotive	BMW M240i Racing	650	(Germany) Robin Reimer	All
(Germany) Adrenalin Motorsport Team Alzner Automotive	BMW M240i Racing	650	(Germany) Nick Deißler	All
(Germany) Adrenalin Motorsport Team Alzner Automotive	BMW M240i Racing	650	(Netherlands) Daan Pijl	4
(Germany) Adrenalin Motorsport Team Alzner Automotive	BMW M240i Racing	651	(France) Yvan Muller	1
(Germany) Adrenalin Motorsport Team Alzner Automotive	BMW M240i Racing	651	(France) Yann Ehrlacher	1
(Germany) Adrenalin Motorsport Team Alzner Automotive	BMW M240i Racing	651	(Netherlands) Daan Pijl	2
(Germany) Adrenalin Motorsport Team Alzner Automotive	BMW M240i Racing	651	(Germany) Henning Deuster	2
(Germany) Adrenalin Motorsport Team Alzner Automotive	BMW M240i Racing	651	(United Kingdom) Alex Toth-Jones	4
(Germany) Adrenalin Motorsport Team Alzner Automotive	BMW M240i Racing	651	(United Kingdom) Sam Neary	4
(Germany) Adrenalin Motorsport Team Alzner Automotive	BMW M240i Racing	651	(Germany) Jens Bombosch	4
(Germany) Adrenalin Motorsport Team Alzner Automotive	BMW M240i Racing	651	(Mexico) Juan Carlos Carmona Chavez	4
(Germany) Adrenalin Motorsport Team Alzner Automotive	BMW M240i Racing	651	(Germany) Christian Kraus	5
(Germany) Adrenalin Motorsport Team Alzner Automotive	BMW M240i Racing	651	(United Kingdom) Simon Glenn	5
(Germany) Adrenalin Motorsport Team Alzner Automotive	BMW M240i Racing	651	(Germany) Nils Steinberg	5
(Germany) Adrenalin Motorsport Team Alzner Automotive	BMW M240i Racing	651	(Germany) Guido Heinrich	5
(Germany) Adrenalin Motorsport Team Alzner Automotive	BMW M240i Racing	651	(United Kingdom) Ross Gunn	6–7
(Germany) Adrenalin Motorsport Team Alzner Automotive	BMW M240i Racing	651	(Canada) Roman De Angelis	6–7
(Germany) Adrenalin Motorsport Team Alzner Automotive	BMW M240i Racing	651	(Germany) Philipp Leisen	8
(Germany) Adrenalin Motorsport Team Alzner Automotive	BMW M240i Racing	651	(Germany) Oliver Frisse	8
(Germany) Adrenalin Motorsport Team Alzner Automotive	BMW M240i Racing	651	(Germany) Jacob Erlbacher	8
(Germany) Adrenalin Motorsport Team Alzner Automotive	BMW M240i Racing	652	(Germany) Lars Harbeck	1–5, 7
(Germany) Adrenalin Motorsport Team Alzner Automotive	BMW M240i Racing	652	(France) Laurent Millara	1
(Germany) Adrenalin Motorsport Team Alzner Automotive	BMW M240i Racing	652	(Switzerland) Michelangelo Comazzi	2–5, 7–8
(Germany) Adrenalin Motorsport Team Alzner Automotive	BMW M240i Racing	652	(Germany) Sascha Radulovic	2
(Germany) Adrenalin Motorsport Team Alzner Automotive	BMW M240i Racing	652	(Switzerland) Michael Lüthi	3–5
(Germany) Adrenalin Motorsport Team Alzner Automotive	BMW M240i Racing	652	(Germany) Christian Kraus	4, 7–8
(Germany) Adrenalin Motorsport Team Alzner Automotive	BMW M240i Racing	652	(Luxembourg) Charles Oakes	5
(Germany) Adrenalin Motorsport Team Alzner Automotive	BMW M240i Racing	652	(Germany) Nils Steinberg	6
(Germany) Adrenalin Motorsport Team Alzner Automotive	BMW M240i Racing	652	(Belgium) Charles Weerts	6
(Germany) Adrenalin Motorsport Team Alzner Automotive	BMW M240i Racing	652	(France) Jean-Baptiste Simmenauer	6
(Germany) Team Mcchip-dkr	BMW M235i Racing	653	(Germany) Alexander Meixner	2–5, 8
(Germany) Team Mcchip-dkr	BMW M235i Racing	653	(Germany) Lucas Lange	2, 4–7
(Germany) Team Mcchip-dkr	BMW M235i Racing	653	(Germany) Sascha Lott	2, 4–7
(Germany) Team Mcchip-dkr	BMW M235i Racing	653	(Germany) Heiko Hammel	3
(Germany) Team Mcchip-dkr	BMW M235i Racing	653	(Germany) Markus Nölken	5, 8
	BMW AG M240i Racing	654	(Germany) Markus Nölken	4, 6
	BMW AG M240i Racing	654	(Germany) Nick Hancke	4, 7
	BMW AG M240i Racing	654	(Germany) Alexander Meixner	6–7
(Germany) Smyrlis Racing	BMW M240i Racing	660	(Germany) Anton Ruf	7–8
(Germany) Smyrlis Racing	BMW M240i Racing	660	(Germany) Patrick Schneider	7
(Germany) Smyrlis Racing	BMW M240i Racing	660	(Germany) Anton Paul Abee	7
(Germany) Smyrlis Racing	BMW M240i Racing	660	(Germany) Daniel Rexhausen	8
(Germany) Smyrlis Racing	BMW M240i Racing	660	(Germany) Jacob Riegel	8
(Germany) Schnitzelalm Racing	BMW M240i Racing	665	(Germany) Michael Sander	5
(Germany) Schnitzelalm Racing	BMW M240i Racing	665	(Germany) Jay Mo Härtling	5
(Germany) Schnitzelalm Racing	BMW M240i Racing	665	(Germany) Tim Neuser	5
(Germany) Schnitzelalm Racing	BMW M240i Racing	665	(Denmark) Dennis Lind	8
(Germany) Schnitzelalm Racing	BMW M240i Racing	665	(Netherlands) Colin Caresani	8
(Germany) Schnitzelalm Racing	BMW M240i Racing	665	(Germany) Dr. Anton Hahnenkamm	8
(Germany) Schnitzelalm Racing	BMW M240i Racing	666	(Germany) Dr. Anton Hahnenkamm	1–6
(Germany) Schnitzelalm Racing	BMW M240i Racing	666	(Germany) Marco Büsker	1–6
(Germany) Schnitzelalm Racing	BMW M240i Racing	666	(Germany) Carl-Friedrich Kolb	1–4
(Germany) Schnitzelalm Racing	BMW M240i Racing	666	(Germany) Carlo Scholl	5
(Germany) Schnitzelalm Racing	BMW M240i Racing	666	(Germany) Timo Kieslich	5
(Germany) Schnitzelalm Racing	BMW M240i Racing	666	(Finland) Elias Seppänen	6
(Germany) Schnitzelalm Racing	BMW M240i Racing	666	(United Kingdom) Sam Neary	7
(Germany) Schnitzelalm Racing	BMW M240i Racing	666	(Denmark) Dennis Lind	7
(Germany) Schnitzelalm Racing	BMW M240i Racing	666	(Netherlands) Colin Caresani	7
(Germany) Schnitzelalm Racing	BMW M240i Racing	666	(France) Yvan Muller	8
(Germany) Schnitzelalm Racing	BMW M240i Racing	666	(France) Yann Ehrlacher	8
(Germany) Schnitzelalm Racing	BMW M240i Racing	673	(Germany) Michael Sander	1–4
(Germany) Schnitzelalm Racing	BMW M240i Racing	673	(Germany) Jay Mo Härtling	1–4
(Germany) Schnitzelalm Racing	BMW M240i Racing	673	(Germany) Michael Bräutigam	1
(Germany) Schnitzelalm Racing	BMW M240i Racing	673	(Switzerland) Julien Apotheloz	2
(Germany) Schnitzelalm Racing	BMW M240i Racing	673	(Germany) Tim Neuser	3–4
(Germany) Schnitzelalm Racing	BMW M240i Racing	674	(Switzerland) Julien Apotheloz	1
(Germany) Schnitzelalm Racing	BMW M240i Racing	674	(Germany) Robin Falkenbach	1
(Germany) Schnitzelalm Racing	BMW M240i Racing	674	(Germany) Herbert Lösch	1
(Germany) Schnitzelalm Racing	BMW M240i Racing	674	(Italy) Simone Sama	3–4
(Germany) Schnitzelalm Racing	BMW M240i Racing	674	(Germany) Timo Kieslich	3–4
(Germany) Schnitzelalm Racing	BMW M240i Racing	674	(Germany) Lorenzo Medori	3
(Germany) Schnitzelalm Racing	BMW M240i Racing	674	(Finland) Juuso Puhakka	4–5
(Germany) Schnitzelalm Racing	BMW M240i Racing	674	(United States) David Thilenius	5
(Germany) Schnitzelalm Racing	BMW M240i Racing	674	(United States) Jaden Conwright	5
(Germany) Schnitzelalm Racing	BMW M240i Racing	674	(Finland) Konsta Lappalainen	5
(Germany) Schnitzelalm Racing	BMW M240i Racing	674	(Germany) Michael Sander	6–8
(Germany) Schnitzelalm Racing	BMW M240i Racing	674	(Germany) Jay Mo Härtling	6–8
(Germany) Schnitzelalm Racing	BMW M240i Racing	674	(Denmark) Dennis Lind	6, 8
(Germany) Schnitzelalm Racing	BMW M240i Racing	674	(Germany) Dr. Anton Hahnenkamm	7
(Germany) Schnitzelalm Racing	BMW M240i Racing	674	(Germany) Tim Neuser	8
(Germany) Monkeytown Racing	BMW M240i Racing	677	(Germany) Anton Ruf	1–6
(Germany) Monkeytown Racing	BMW M240i Racing	677	(Germany) Patrick Schneider	1–6
(Germany) Monkeytown Racing	BMW M240i Racing	677	(Germany) Alexander Rölleke	1–2
(Germany) Monkeytown Racing	BMW M240i Racing	677	(Germany) Achim Feinen	3–5
(Germany) Monkeytown Racing	BMW M240i Racing	677	(Germany) Anton Paul Abee	6
(Switzerland) Hofor Racing by BONK Motorsport	BMW M240i Racing	700	(Germany) Lando Graf von Wede	8
(Switzerland) Hofor Racing by BONK Motorsport	BMW M240i Racing	700	(Germany) Alexis Graf von Wede	8
BMW M2 CS
(Germany) Adrenalin Motorsport	BMW M2 ClubSport Racing	870	(Germany) Yannick Fübrich	1–4
(Germany) Adrenalin Motorsport	BMW M2 ClubSport Racing	870	(Austria) David Griessner	1–4
(Germany) Adrenalin Motorsport	BMW M2 ClubSport Racing	870	(United Kingdom) Brett Lidsey	2–4
(Germany) Adrenalin Motorsport	BMW M2 ClubSport Racing	870	(Germany) Lars Harbeck	6
(Germany) Adrenalin Motorsport	BMW M2 ClubSport Racing	870	(Switzerland) Michelangelo Comazzi	6
(Germany) Adrenalin Motorsport	BMW M2 ClubSport Racing	870	(Belgium) Charles Weerts	6
(Germany) Adrenalin Motorsport	BMW M2 ClubSport Racing	870	(Germany) Stefan Kruse	6
(Germany) Adrenalin Motorsport	BMW M2 ClubSport Racing	871	(Germany) Stefan Kruse	1–5, 7–8
(Germany) Adrenalin Motorsport	BMW M2 ClubSport Racing	871	(Switzerland) Guido Wirtz	1–5
(Germany) Adrenalin Motorsport	BMW M2 ClubSport Racing	871	(United Kingdom) Brett Lidsey	1, 5, 7–8
(Germany) Adrenalin Motorsport	BMW M2 ClubSport Racing	871	(Germany) Guido Heinrich	2
(Germany) Adrenalin Motorsport	BMW M2 ClubSport Racing	871	(Germany) Andreas Winkler	3
(Germany) Adrenalin Motorsport	BMW M2 ClubSport Racing	871	(Germany) Roland Froese	4
(Germany) Adrenalin Motorsport	BMW M2 ClubSport Racing	871	(Austria) David Griessner	5, 7–8
(Germany) Schubert Motorsport	BMW M2 ClubSport Racing	880	(Germany) Torsten Schubert	1
(Germany) Schubert Motorsport	BMW M2 ClubSport Racing	880	(Germany) Stefan von Zabiensky	1
(Germany) Schubert Motorsport	BMW M2 ClubSport Racing	880	(Germany) Michael von Zabiensky	1
	BMW M2 ClubSport Racing	883	(Germany) Tobias Vazquez-Garcia	All
	BMW M2 ClubSport Racing	883	(Germany) Michele Di Martino	2, 5
	BMW M2 ClubSport Racing	883	(Germany) Michael Tischner	4
(Germany) Fugel Sport	BMW M2 ClubSport Racing	885	(Germany) Dominik Fugel	1–4
(Germany) Fugel Sport	BMW M2 ClubSport Racing	885	(Germany) Marcel Fugel	1–4
(Germany) Walkenhorst Motorsport	BMW M2 ClubSport Racing	888	(Germany) Florian Weber	1–2
(Germany) Walkenhorst Motorsport	BMW M2 ClubSport Racing	888	(Belgium) Esteban Muth	1–2
(Germany) Walkenhorst Motorsport	BMW M2 ClubSport Racing	888	(United Kingdom) Sam Neary	2
	BMW M2 ClubSport Racing	890	(Sweden) Peter Larsen	5
	BMW M2 ClubSport Racing	890	(Sweden) Johan Rosèn	5
	BMW M2 ClubSport Racing	890	(Germany) Christian Albinger	5
(Switzerland) Hofor Racing by BONK Motorsport	BMW M2 ClubSport Racing	891	(Germany) Felix Partl	2
(Switzerland) Hofor Racing by BONK Motorsport	BMW M2 ClubSport Racing	891	(Germany) Michael Mayer	2
(Switzerland) Hofor Racing by BONK Motorsport	BMW M2 ClubSport Racing	891	(Germany) Max Partl	2
OPC
	Opel Astra OPC	850	(France) Jean-Philippe Imparato	2
	Opel Astra OPC	850	(France) Carlos Antunes Tavares	2
	Opel Astra OPC	850	(France) Francois Wales	2
	Opel Astra OPC	858	(Germany) 'Achim'	4, 6
	Opel Astra OPC	858	(Germany) Benjamin Zerfeld	4, 6
Entrylists:

== Results ==
Results indicates overall winner across all classes.

Rnd	Race	Pole position	Overall winners
1	67. ADAC Westfalenfahrt	(Austria) No. 7 Konrad Motorsport	(Germany) No. 911 Manthey Racing
1	67. ADAC Westfalenfahrt	(Zimbabwe) Axcil Jefferies (Italy) Michele di Martino	(Denmark) Michael Christensen (France) Frédéric Makowiecki (Belgium) Laurens Vanthoor
2	53. Adenauer ADAC Rundstrecken-Trophy	(Germany) No. 9 ROWE Racing	(Germany) No. 9 ROWE Racing
2	53. Adenauer ADAC Rundstrecken-Trophy	(United States) Connor De Phillippi (Brazil) Augusto Farfus	(United States) Connor De Phillippi (Brazil) Augusto Farfus
3	45. RCM DMV Grenzlandrennen	(Germany) No. 34 Walkenhorst Motorsport	(Germany) No. 16 Scherer Sport Team Phoenix
3	45. RCM DMV Grenzlandrennen	(Norway) Christian Krognes (Finland) Sami-Matti Trogen	(Poland) Jakub Giermaziak (Germany) René Rast
4	ROWE 6 Stunden ADAC Ruhr-Pokal-Rennen	(Germany) No. 34 Walkenhorst Motorsport	(Germany) No. 3 Falken Motorsports
4	ROWE 6 Stunden ADAC Ruhr-Pokal-Rennen	(Norway) Christian Krognes (Spain) Andy Soucek (United Kingdom) Ben Tuck	(Sweden) Joel Eriksson (Germany) Sven Müller
5	12 Stunden Nürburgring	(Germany) No. 16 Scherer Sport Team Phoenix	(Germany) No. 3 Falken Motorsports
5	12 Stunden Nürburgring	(Poland) Jakub Giermaziak (Germany) Kim-Luis Schramm	(Sweden) Joel Eriksson (New Zealand) Jaxon Evans (Germany) Sven Müller (Belgium) Alessio Picariello
6	54. ADAC Barbarossapreis	(Germany) No. 5 Scherer Sport Team Phoenix	(Germany) No. 16 Scherer Sport Team Phoenix
6	54. ADAC Barbarossapreis	(Germany) Vincent Kolb (Germany) Frank Stippler	(Poland) Jakub Giermaziak (Germany) Kim-Luis Schramm (Germany) Luca Engstler
7	PAGID Racing 46. DMV Münsterlandpokal	(Germany) No. 5 Scherer Sport Team Phoenix	(Germany) No. 16 Scherer Sport Team Phoenix
7	PAGID Racing 46. DMV Münsterlandpokal	(Germany) Vincent Kolb (Germany) Frank Stippler	(Poland) Jakub Giermaziak (South Africa) Kelvin van der Linde
8	46. NIMEX DMV 4-Stunden-Rennen	(Germany) No. 5 Scherer Sport Team Phoenix	(Germany) No. 16 Scherer Sport Team Phoenix
8	46. NIMEX DMV 4-Stunden-Rennen	(Germany) Vincent Kolb (Germany) Frank Stippler	(Poland) Jakub Giermaziak (Germany) Kim-Luis Schramm

== Championship standings ==
=== Points system ===
==== Drivers classification ====
For drivers classification, points are awarded based on race duration, position in class, and number of starters in class. At the end of the season, best 7 races will count for the championship and the rest will be dropped; however, disqualifications or race bans cannot be dropped.

In case of a driver entering for multiple cars in a race, they should nominate which car should they score points from; otherwise they automatically score from the car with the lowest start number.

4-hours race

Position in class	Starter cars in class						
Position in class	1	2	3	4	5	6	7+
1st	2	3	4	6	8	11	15
2nd	-	2	3	4	6	8	11
3rd	-	-	2	3	4	6	8
4th	-	-	-	2	3	4	6
5th	-	-	-	-	2	3	4
6th	-	-	-	-	-	2	3
7th	-	-	-	-	-	-	2
8th and below	-	-	-	-	-	-	1

6-hours race

Position in class	Starter cars in class						
Position in class	1	2	3	4	5	6	7+
1st	3	4	5	8	10	14	19
2nd	-	3	4	5	8	10	14
3rd	-	-	3	4	5	8	10
4th	-	-	-	3	4	5	8
5th	-	-	-	-	3	4	5
6th	-	-	-	-	-	3	4
7th	-	-	-	-	-	-	3
8th and below	-	-	-	-	-	-	1

12-hours race

Position in class	Starter cars in class						
Position in class	1	2	3	4	5	6	7+
1st	4	6	8	12	16	22	30
2nd	-	4	6	8	12	16	22
3rd	-	-	4	6	8	12	16
4th	-	-	-	4	6	8	12
5th	-	-	-	-	4	6	8
6th	-	-	-	-	-	4	6
7th	-	-	-	-	-	-	4
8th and below	-	-	-	-	-	-	2

==== Teams ====
For teams championships, points are awarded by finishing position regardless of race duration. Also, for overall teams classification only, bonus points are awarded for top 3 in qualifying.

Position	1st	2nd	3rd	4th	5th	6th	7th	8th	9th	10th	11th	12th	13th	14th	15th	16th	17th	18th	19th	20th
Qualifying	3	2	1																	
Race	35	28	25	22	20	18	16	14	12	11	10	9	8	7	6	5	4	3	2	1

=== Teams classification ===
==== NLS Speed-Trophäe (Overall) ====
Displaying entries that has achieved top 20 finish and/or top 3 qualifying in at least 1 round.

Pos.	Team	Class	NLS1	NLS3	NLS4	NLS5	NLS6	NLS7	NLS8	NLS2 (Note: The 46. NIMEX DMV 4-Stunden-Rennen was originally scheduled as the second event but got postponed to end of season.)	Points
1	(Germany) #16 Scherer Sport Team Phoenix	SP9 Pro	7^{3}	6	1	Ret	2^{1}	1^{3}	1^{3}	1^{2}	210
2	(Germany) #5 Scherer Sport Team Phoenix	SP9 Pro	8	13	3^{2}	2^{3}	3	2^{1}	2^{1}	2^{1}	196
3	(Germany) #34 Walkenhorst Motorsport	SP9 Pro	DNS	3^{3}	2^{1}	3^{1}	Ret^{2}	DNS	6	3	130
4	(Germany) #3 Falken Motorsports	SP9 Pro	Ret			1	1		7		86
5	(Germany) #120 AVIA W&S Motorsport	CUP2	18	18	25	9	11	7	8	5	78
6	(Germany) #2 Schnitzelalm Racing	SP9 Pro	Ret		6	Ret	10	4	4		73
7	(Germany) #112 KKrämer Racing	CUP2	15	16	13	12	13	6	27	16	59
8	(Germany) #35 Walkenhorst Motorsport	SP9 Pro	13	Ret	7					7	40
9	(Germany) #17 PROsport Racing	SP9 Pro-Am	16	Ret	19	Ret	9	5	Ret	Ret	39
10=	(Germany) #99 ROWE Racing	SP9 Pro		1^{1}							38
10=	(Germany) #107 Team Mathol Racing	CUP2	22	Ret	10	14	12	Ret	10	Ret	38
12=	(Germany) #23 (Lionspeed by) Car Collection Motorsport	SP9 Pro-Am	100		12	8	8	25			37
12=	(Germany) #25 Huber Motorsport	SP9 Pro-Am	14	41		10^{2}		8^{2}			37
12=	(Germany) #25 Huber Motorsport	SP9 Pro								Ret^{3}	37
14	(Germany) #911 Manthey Racing	SP9 Pro	1	Ret					Ret		35
14	(Germany) #911 Manthey Racing	SPX						3‡			35
15=	(Germany) #4 Falken Motorsports	SP9 Pro	Ret			7	6				34
15=	(Austria) #7 Konrad Motorsport	SP9 Pro	10^{1}			5					34
15=	(Germany) #36 Walkenhorst Motorsport	SP9 Am	34	67	20		18			6	34
15=	(Germany) #36 Walkenhorst Motorsport	SP9 Pro-Am				17		13	34		34
15=	(Germany) #102 Black Falcon Team IDENTICA	CUP2	17	15	9	Ret	Ret	9	Ret	Ret	34
19=	(Germany) #12 Mercedes-AMG Team Bilstein	SP9 Pro	4	10							33
19=	(Belgium) #123 Mühlner Motorsport	CUP2	19	Ret	Ret	18	15	11	9	Ret	33
21	(Hong Kong) #18 KCMG	SP9 Pro	3	17							29
22	(Germany) #111 Frikadelli Racing Team	CUP2	23	23	16	16	Ret	14	13	Ret	25
23	(Germany) #949 Team Sorg Rennsport	CUP3	38	52	32		Ret	16	14	11	22
24=	(Germany) #20 Schubert Motorsport	SP9 Pro	5								20
24=	(Germany) #98 ROWE Racing	SP9 Pro		5							20
26	(Germany) #6 Haupt Racing Team	SP9 Pro	49	Ret	Ret^{3}	6		Ret	DNS		19
27=	(Germany) #14 RaceIng - Racing Engineers GmbH	SP9 Pro-Am		19	15	11		Ret			18
27=	(Germany) #22 Audi Sport Team Car Collection	SP9 Pro	6								18
29=	(Germany) #44 BMW Junior Team	SP9 Pro	9^{2}	2^{2}‡							14
29=	(Germany) #959 Team Sorg Rennsport	CUP3	54	38	34	22	19	36	31	9	14
31=	(Germany) #24 Lionspeed by Car Collection Motorsport	SP9 Pro	11		Ret		39	Ret			10
31=	(Germany) #114 FK Performance Motorsport	CUP2	Ret	Ret	11		Ret				10
31=	(Germany) #955 Team Mathol Racing	CUP3	105	45			27	27	18	14	10
34	(Germany) #39 racing one	SP9 Am		DNQ							9
34	(Germany) #39 racing one	SP9 Pro-Am					Ret	12			9
35	(Germany) #125 Huber Motorsport	CUP2	28	28	18	20	38	17			8
36	(Netherlands) #50 Twin Busch by équipe vitesse	SP9 Am				15		23			6
37	(United States) #101 RPM Racing	CUP2	33	30	24	Ret	16	NC	Ret		5
38	(Germany) #944 9und11 Racing	CUP3	42	53	40	29	35	31	21	18	3
39=	(Norway) #801 Møller Bil Motorsport	TCR		49	50			28	22	19	2
39=	(Germany) #920 Teichmann Racing	CUPX	25	32	27	DNS	Ret	19			2
41=	(Germany) #212 Schmickler Performance powered by Ravenol	SP3T		34	30	Ret	20				1
41=	(Germany) #976 FK Performance Motorsport	CUP3	32	35	26	32	32	Ret	Ret	20	1
Entries ineligible for championship
-	(Germany) #29 Montaplast by Land Motorsport	SP9 Pro	2								-
-	(Germany) #11 Schnitzelalm Racing	SP9 Pro			5	Ret	5		3		-
-	(Germany) #55 Mercedes-AMG Landgraf Young Talents / Landgraf Motorsport	SP9 Pro	12	8	4	4	7	DSQ	Ret	Ret	-
-	(Italy) #30 Dinamic Motorsport	SP9 Pro							5		-
-	(Italy) #30 Dinamic Motorsport	SPX								4	-
-	(Switzerland) #26 Octane126	SP9 Pro		12			4				-
-	(Germany) #27 Toksport WRT	SP9 Pro		4							-
-	(United Kingdom) #21 TF Sport	SP9 Pro		7							-
-	(Germany) #969 Schmickler Performance powered by Ravenol	CUP3	30	31	33	23	17	18	17	8	-
-	(Germany) #9 Team GetSpeed Performance	SP9 Pro-Am		8							-
-	(Germany) #15 Audi Sport Team Phoenix	SP9 Pro		9							-
-	(Austria) #53 True Racing	SPX	Ret	Ret				10	11		-
-	(Germany) #952 Smyrlis Racing	CUP3			29	24	30	15	16	10	-
-	(Germany) #8 Mercedes-AMG Team GetSpeed	SP9 Pro		11							-
-	(Germany) #104 Black Falcon	CUP2	20	21	14	13	14^{3}	Ret	12		-
-	(Germany) #971 G-Tech Competition	CUP3							Ret	12	-
-	(Germany) #950 Schmickler Performance powered by Ravenol	CUP3		39	Ret	28		20	19	13	-
-	(United States) #56 Glickenhaus Racing LLC	SPX		14							-
-	(Germany) #177 Waldow Performance	SP10			35	25	26	24	15	15	-
-	(Germany) #103 Black Falcon	CUP2	21	20	17	19	23	Ret	Ret		-
-	(Germany) #830 Scherer Sport	TCR								17	-
-	(Germany) #962 AVIA W&S Motorsport	CUP3				36			20	Ret	-
-	(Germany) #74 Manthey Racing	SP9 Pro							Ret^{2}		-

‡: Result not counted for classification

Colour	Result
Gold	Winner
Silver	Second place
Bronze	Third place
Green	Points classification
Blue	Non-points classification
Blue	Non-classified finish (NC)
Purple	Retired, not classified (Ret)
Red	Did not qualify (DNQ)
Red	Did not pre-qualify (DNPQ)
Black	Disqualified (DSQ)
White	Did not start (DNS)
White	Withdrew (WD)
White	Race cancelled (C)
Blank	Did not practice (DNP)
Blank	Did not arrive (DNA)
Blank	Excluded (EX)

== See also ==
- 2022 24 Hours of Nürburgring

== Bibliography ==
- Tim Upietz & Patrik Koziolek (21 December 2022). Nürburgring Langstrecken-Serie 2022. Gruppe C Motorsport Verlag. ISBN 978-3-948501-20-4.
