= Tim Scheerbarth =

German racing driver (born 1989)

- Nationality: (Germany) German
- Born: 8 February 1989 (age 37) Dormagen, Germany
- Categorisation: FIA Silver

Championship titles
- 2025 2021 2019 2017, 2018 2016 2012 2011: Porsche Endurance Trophy Nürburgring – Cup 2 NLS – Cup 3 VLN Series – SP10; VLN Series – Cup 2 VLN Series – SP7; VLN Series – V6; VLN Series

Tim Franz Scheerbarth (born 8 February 1989) is a German racing driver who competes in the Porsche Endurance Trophy Nürburgring for Mühlner Motorsport. A Nürburgring specialist, Scheerbarth is the overall 2011 VLN Series champion and a four-time class winner of the Nürburgring 24 Hours.

== Personal life ==
Scheerbarth studied automotive engineering at the Cologne University of Applied Sciences. Alongside his racing career, Scheerbarth is a driving instructor at Scuderia Hanseat.

== Career ==
Scheerbarth began his racing career in 2007, competing in the Nürburgring-based VLN Series. In 2009, Scheerbarth joined the VLN Honda Junior Team, before switching to Team MK Motorsport for 2010. Moving to Black Falcon for 2011, Scheerbarth won the overall VLN Series title and the 24 Hours of Nürburgring in the V5 class. The following year, Scheerbarth clinched the VLN title in the V6 class and the 24 Hours of Nürburgring in V5. After stepping up to SP7 in 2013, Scheerbarth made his GT3 debut in the SP9 class the following year in a Mercedes-Benz SLS AMG GT3 for Black Falcon, as well as finishing second in the V6 class of the 24 Hours of Nürburgring.

A season split in four different categories then followed, headlined by a class win in the Cup category, before Scheerbarth won the SP7 title in 2016 for Black Falcon, two consecutive titles in Cup 2 for GetSpeed Performance and Mühlner Motorsport, as well as the SP10 title in 2019 on his return to Black Falcon. Returning to Porsche one-make classes for 2020, Scheerbarth was runner-up with 9und11 Racing Team in the Cup 2 standings, as well as finishing second in SP7 at the 24 Hours of Nürburgring for W&S Motorsport. Moving to W&S full-time for 2021, Scheerbarth won the Cup 3 title, as well as winning the 24 Hours of Nürburgring for Schaeffler's Space Drive Racing in a steer-by-wire 2017-spec Mercedes-AMG GT3.

In 2022, Scheerbarth continued with W&S Motorsport to compete in the newly-established Porsche Endurance Trophy Nürburgring in the Cup 2 class, taking two class wins en route to fourth in points. After another race-winning campaign in 2023, Scheerbarth bounced back to finish runner-up in 2024, as well as winning the 24 Hours of Nürburgring in Cup2 Pro with Black Falcon. Returning to Mühlner Motorsport for 2025, Scheerbarth dominated PETN by taking seven out of ten wins to clinch the Cup 2 title, before returning to the team the following year to compete in both PETN and the 24 Hours of Nürburgring.

== Racing record ==
=== Racing career summary ===
Season	Series	Team	Races	Wins	Poles	F/Laps	Podiums	Points	Position
2007	VLN Series								
2008	VLN Series								
2008	Rundstrecken-Challenge Nürburgring								
2009	VLN Series	VLN Honda Junior Team							
2009	24 Hours of Nürburgring – SP4T	MSC Adenau	1	0	0	0	0	—N/a	DNF
2010	VLN Series	MOTEC Wheels Team MK Motorsport							
2010	24 Hours of Nürburgring – V4		1	0	0	0	0	—N/a	DNF
2011	VLN Series	Black Falcon							1st
2011	24 Hours of Nürburgring – V5	Black Falcon Team TMD Friction	1	1	0	0	1	—N/a	1st
2012	VLN Series – V6								1st
2012	24 Hours of Nürburgring – V5	Black Falcon Team TMD Friction	1	1	0	0	1	—N/a	1st
2012	24 Hours of Nürburgring – V6	Black Falcon Team TMD Friction	1	0	0	0	0	—N/a	4th
2013	VLN Series – SP7			1					
2014	VLN Series – SP9 Pro	Black Falcon	1	0	0	0	0		
2014	24 Hours of Nürburgring – V6	Black Falcon Team TMD Friction	1	0	0	0	1	—N/a	2nd
2015	VLN Series – SP7		4	0	0	0	1		
2015	VLN Series – SP9 Pro		2	0	0	0	0		
2015	VLN Series – SP3T		1	0	0	0	1		
2015	VLN Series – Cup		1	1	0	0	1		
2015	24 Hours of Nürburgring – SP7	Black Falcon Team TMD Friction	1	0	0	0	0	—N/a	DNF
2015	GT4 European Series – Pro	Sofia Car Motorsport	0	0	0	0	0	0	NC
2016	VLN Series – SP7	Black Falcon							1st
2016	24 Hours of Nürburgring – SP7	9und11 Racing	1	0	0	0	0	—N/a	5th
2017	VLN Series – Cup 2	GetSpeed Performance							1st
2017	24 Hours of Nürburgring – SP7	Goder	1	0	0	0	0	—N/a	5th
2018	VLN Series – Cup 2	Mühlner Motorsport	9	6					1st
2018	24 Hours of Nürburgring – SP7	Team 9und11	1	0	0	0	1	—N/a	3rd
2019	VLN Series – SP10	Black Falcon	8	4	0	0	7	64.06	1st
2019	24 Hours of Nürburgring – SP7	Team 9und11 Racing	1	0	0	0	0	—N/a	4th
2019	VLN Series – SP9 Pro	HTP Motorsport	1	0	0	0	1	7.5	52nd
2020	Nürburgring Langstrecken-Serie – Cup 2	9und11 Racing Team	2	2	0	0	2	10	2nd
2020	Nürburgring Langstrecken-Serie – V5	9und11 Racing Team	2	0	0	0	1	7.86	16th
2020	24 Hours of Nürburgring – SP7	W&S Motorsport	1	0	0	0	0	—N/a	2nd
2021	Nürburgring Langstrecken-Serie – Cup 3	W&S Motorsport	7	4	0	0	6	66.04	1st
2021	24 Hours of Nürburgring – SP-X	Space Drive Racing	1	1	0	0	1	—N/a	1st
2021	24H GT Series – GTX	9und11 Racing	1	1	0	0	1	18	NC
2022	Porsche Endurance Trophy Nürburgring – Cup 2	AVIA W&S Motorsport	6	2	0	0	4	122	4th
2022	24 Hours of Nürburgring – Cup2	Black Falcon Team IDENTICA	1	0	0	0	0	—N/a	DNF
2023	Porsche Endurance Trophy Nürburgring – Cup 2	AVIA W&S Motorsport	7	1	1	2	3	78	13th
2023	Nürburgring Langstrecken-Serie – SP7	9und11 Racing	2	1	0	0	1	4	4th
2023	24H GT Series – GTX	9und11 Racing	1	0	0	0	0	28	NC
2024	Porsche Endurance Trophy Nürburgring – Cup 2	AVIA W&S Motorsport	8	2	4	1	6	122.5	2nd
2024	24H Series – GTX	9und11 Racing	2	1	0	0	2	72	3rd
2024	24 Hours of Nürburgring – Cup2 Pro	Black Falcon	1	1	0	0	1	—N/a	1st
2025	Porsche Endurance Trophy Nürburgring – Cup 2	Mühlner Motorsport	10	7	3	2	9	169	1st
2025	24 Hours of Nürburgring – Cup2 Pro	Black Falcon	1	0	0	0	1	—N/a	2nd
2025	24H Series – 992 Am	9und11 Racing	2	0	0	0	0	48	NC
2025	992 Endurance Cup – Am-Silver	9und11 Racing	1	0	0	0	0	—N/a	7th
2026	Porsche Endurance Trophy Nürburgring – Cup 2	Mühlner Motorsport						*	*
2026	24H Series – 992	Mühlner Motorsport	1	1	0	0	1	40	19th
2026	24 Hours of Nürburgring – Cup2 Pro	Mühlner Motorsport	1	0	0	0	0	—N/a	DNF

^{†} As Scheerbarth was a guest driver, he was ineligible to score points.

=== Complete 24 Hours of Nürburgring results ===
Year	Team	Co-Drivers	Car	Class	Laps	Pos.	Class Pos.
2009	(Germany) MSC Adenau	(Germany) Stephan Wölflich (Germany) Urs Bressan (Germany) Michael Klein	Ford Mondeo	SP4T	40	DNF	DNF
2010		(Germany) Matthias Unger (Germany) Daniel Zils (Germany) Guido Wirtz	BMW Z4	V4	56	DNF	DNF
2011	(Germany) Black Falcon Team TMD Friction	(Germany) Carsten Knechtges (Germany) Manuel Metzger (Germany) Philipp Leisen	BMW Z4	V5	135	31st	1st
2012	(Germany) Black Falcon Team TMD Friction	(Switzerland) Christian Raubach (Germany) Christian von Riff (Germany) Carsten Knechtges	BMW E92	V5	130	42nd	1st
2012	(Germany) Black Falcon Team TMD Friction	(Luxembourg) Steve Jans (Germany) Carsten Knechtges (Germany) David Jahn	BMW M3	V6	130	45th	4th
2014	(Germany) Black Falcon Team TMD Friction	(Netherlands) "Gerwin" (Netherlands) "Philip" (Switzerland) Manuel Metzger	Porsche 991 Cup	V6	138	30th	2nd
2015		(Germany) Georg Goder (Germany) Dirk Leßmeister (Germany) Martin Schlüter	Porsche 997 GT3 Cup	SP7	28	DNF	DNF
2016	(Germany) 9und11 Racing	(Germany) Georg Goder (Germany) Dirk Leßmeister (Germany) Martin Schlüter	Porsche 991 GT3 Cup	SP7	114	36th	5th
2017	(Germany) Goder	(Germany) Vincent Kolb (Germany) Georg Goder (Germany) Martin Schlüter	Porsche 991 GT3 Cup	SP7	130	61st	5th
2018	(Germany) Team 9und11 Racing	(Germany) Georg Goder (Germany) Ralf Oehme (Germany) Martin Schlüter	Porsche 911 GT3 Cup	SP7	122	30th	3rd
2019	(Germany) Team 9und11 Racing	(Germany) Georg Goder (Germany) Ralf Oehme (Germany) Martin Schlüter	Porsche 911 GT3 Cup	SP7	143	27th	4th
2020	(Germany) W&S Motorsport	(Germany) Marvin Dienst (Germany) Niklas Steinhaus (Germany) Kai Riemer	Porsche Cayman 718 GT4 MR	SP7	76	29th	2nd
2021	(Germany) Space Drive Racing	(United Kingdom) Philip Ellis (Germany) Dominik Farnbacher (United Kingdom) Darren Turner	Mercedes-AMG GT3 (2017)	SP-X	56	16th	1st
2022	(Germany) Black Falcon Team IDENTICA	(Netherlands) Paul Harkema (Germany) Noah Nagelsdiek (Germany) Tobias Müller	Porsche 911 GT3 Cup (992)	Cup2; Pro	97	DNF	DNF
2024	(Germany) Black Falcon	(Turkey) Mustafa Mehmet Kaya (Italy) Gabriele Piana (Germany) Mike Stursberg	Porsche 911 GT3 Cup (992)	Cup2; Pro	48	20th	1st
2025	(Belgium) Mühlner Motorsport	(Germany) Nick Salewsky (Estonia) Martin Rump	Porsche 911 GT3 Cup (992)	Cup2; Pro	134	14th	2nd
2026	(Belgium) Mühlner Motorsport	(Denmark) Michelle Gatting (Germany) Michael Rebhan (Germany) Nick Salewsky	Porsche 911 GT3 Cup (992.1)	Cup2; Pro	123	DNF	DNF
