= Moritz Kranz =

German racing driver (born 1987)

- Kranz in 2022
- Nationality: (Germany) German
- Born: 7 July 1987 (age 39) Linz am Rhein, Germany
- Categorisation: FIA Bronze (2015–2021); FIA Silver (2022–)

Championship titles
- 2023 2018–2019 2017–2018 2017: PETN – Cup 2 VLN Series – Cup 2 Cayman GT4 Trophy; VLN Series – Cup 3

Moritz Kranz (born 7 July 1987) is a German racing driver who last competed in the Nürburgring Langstrecken-Serie for Gamota Racing.

== Career ==
Kranz began karting in 1998, before stopping in 2008 on financial grounds, only to make his car racing debut four years later. Until 2015, Kranz competed in the Rundstrecken Challenge Nürburgring and the VLN Series on a part-time basis, culminating in his 24 Hours of Nürburgring debut. He undertook his first full VLN season in 2016, and made a cameo in the Mazda MX-5 Cup Global Invitational.

Moving to Porsche-fielding Mühlner Motorsport for 2017, Kranz won VLN's Cup 3 and Cayman GT4 titles with Hamza Owega and Alex Schula, while also making a one-off outing in the Continental Tire SportsCar Challenge with Gabriele Piana. Primarily continuing in the VLN Series in 2018, Kranz sealed the Cup 2 title on debut alongside Marcel Hoppe and Tim Scheerbarth, as well as securing his second Cayman GT4 title and winning the 24 Hours of Nürburgring in Cup 3. That year, Kranz also made select outings for Mühlner in the SprintX GT Championship Series and GT4 European Series, taking an Am class win at Spa in the latter. In 2019, Kranz clinched his second consecutive VLN Cup 2 title with Hoppe, finished third in Cup 3, and also won the 24 Hours of Nürburgring in SP7.

In 2020, Kranz entered the Le Mans Cup in LMP3 with Mühlner. Despite being a bronze-rated driver, he set the fastest lap at Le Castellet, and took a podium at the Portimão finale with Alex Kapadia to finish ninth in points. In parallel, Kranz also competed in the newly-renamed Nürburgring Langstrecken-Serie, finishing runner-up in SP7 and third in the Cup 3 standings. Moving stateside for 2021, Kranz won three of six IMSA Prototype Challenge races to secure runner-up honours — Daytona with Laurents Hörr, Mid-Ohio solo, and Road Atlanta with Ugo de Wilde. He also scored pole and third place in LMP3 at the 24 Hours of Daytona. Over in Europe, Kranz and De Wilde claimed pole and won race two of the Road to Le Mans for Mühlner. In NLS, Kranz reunited with GetSpeed Performance to drive a Mercedes-AMG GT3 Evo, guiding Janine Shoffner to the SP9 Am title on his GT3 debut with six class wins from six starts.

After an upgrade to silver for 2022, Kranz focused on GT3 competition, moving to the International GT Open to partner Janine Shoffner at GetSpeed in the Pro-Am class. After three class podiums and three overall top fives at the Hungaroring and Red Bull Ring, a crash for Shoffner at Monza brought the season to a premature end, with the Mercedes unable to be fixed in time for the Barcelona finale. That year, Kranz also won the 24 Hours of Nürburgring in the Cup 2 class for KKrämer Racing, and returned to Mühlner's LMP3 stable for the 24 Hours of Daytona.

In 2023, Kranz remained with KKrämer Racing to share a Porsche 911 GT3 Cup (992) with Christopher Brück in the new Porsche Endurance Trophy Nürburgring, securing three wins, two poles and seven podiums to clinch the Cup 2 title. Kranz also competed for AWA at the 24 Hours of Daytona in LMP3, and took class podiums at the 24 Hours of Nürburgring and 12 Hours of Kuwait for KKrämer. Kranz then returned to Mühlner Motorsport ahead of the 2024 PETN season, in which he took four podiums and was ninth in the Cup 2 standings.

After a shoulder injury in testing left him on the sidelines for 2025, Kranz began acting as an engineer for Mühlner's PETN programme, which won the Cup 2 title that year. In 2026, Kranz returned to racing, joining Gamota Racing to race a BMW M4 GT3 Evo in the SP9 Pro-Am class of the Nürburgring Langstrecken-Serie alongside David Jahn and Antal Zsigó. With the team, Kranz scored a lone class win at NLS3, as well as helping the team secure three pole positions to end the year fourth in points.

== Racing record ==
=== Racing career summary ===
Season	Series	Team	Races	Wins	Poles	F/Laps	Podiums	Points	Position
2015	24 Hours of Nürburgring – SP6	Prosport-Performance GmbH	1	0	0	0	0	—N/a	DNF
2016	VLN Series	StilGut Team GetSpeed							
2016	Mazda MX-5 Cup Global Invitational		2	0	0	0	0	98	4th
2017	VLN Series – Cup 3	Mühlner Motorsport							**1st**
2017	Cayman GT4 Trophy	Mühlner Motorsport							**1st**
2017	24 Hours of Nürburgring – SP10	Mühlner Motorsport	1	0	0	0	0	—N/a	DNF
2017	Continental Tire SportsCar Challenge – GS	Mühlner Motorsports America	1	0	0	0	0	22	30th
2018	VLN Series – Cup 2	Mühlner Motorsport							**1st**
2018	VLN Series – Cup 3	Mühlner Motorsport							**2nd**
2018	Cayman GT4 Trophy	Mühlner Motorsport							**1st**
2018	24 Hours of Nürburgring – Cup 3	Mühlner Motorsport	1	1	0	0	1	—N/a	**1st**
2018	SprintX GT Championship Series – GTS Pro-Am	Mühlner Motorsports America	4	0	0	0	0	28	30th
2018	SprintX GT Championship Series – GTS Am	Mühlner Motorsports America	2	0	0	0	0	44	19th
2018	GT4 European Series – Am	Mühlner Motorsport	2	1	1	1	2	43	12th
2019	VLN Series – Cup 2	Mühlner Motorsport	8	6	0	0	7	47.5	**1st**
2019	VLN Series – Cup 3	Mühlner Motorsport	8	5	0	0	6	55.26	**3rd**
2019	24 Hours of Nürburgring – SP7	Mühlner Motorsport	1	1	0	0	1	—N/a	**1st**
2019	24 Hours of Nürburgring – Cup 3	Mühlner Motorsport	1	0	0	0	0	—N/a	4th
2020	Nürburgring Langstrecken-Serie – SP7	Mühlner Motorsport	4	3	0	0	4	35.13	**2nd**
2020	Nürburgring Langstrecken-Serie – Cup 3	Mühlner Motorsport	4	3	0	0	4	36.84	**3rd**
2020	Le Mans Cup – LMP3	Mühlner Motorsport	7	0	0	1	1	34.5	9th
2020	Lamborghini Super Trofeo North America – Am	TPC Racing	2	0	1	0	2	23	**3rd**
2020	24H GT Series Europe – 991	Mühlner Motorsport	1	1	0	0	1	28	7th
2020	24H GT Series Europe – Cayman	Mühlner Motorsport	1	1	0	0	1	0	NC
2021	IMSA Prototype Challenge – LMP3-1	Mühlner Motorsports America	6	3	6	0	4	1840	**2nd**
2021	IMSA SportsCar Championship – LMP3	Mühlner Motorsports America	1	0	1	0	1	0	NC
2021	Nürburgring Langstrecken-Serie – SP9 Am	GetSpeed Performance	6	6	6	0	6	43.74	**2nd**
2021	24 Hours of Nürburgring – SP9 Pro-Am	GetSpeed Performance	1	0	0	0	0	—N/a	4th
2021	Le Mans Cup – LMP3	Mühlner Motorsport	2	1	1	0	1	16.5	18th
2021	GT4 European Series – Pro-Am	Selleslagh Racing Team	2	0	0	0	1	27	16th
2022	IMSA Prototype Challenge – LMP3	Mühlner Motorsports America	0	0	0	0	0	0	44th
2022	IMSA SportsCar Championship – LMP3	Mühlner Motorsports America	1	0	0	0	0	0	NC
2022	Porsche Endurance Trophy Nürburgring – Cup 2	KKrämer Racing	5	0	0	0	0	0	NC
2022	24 Hours of Nürburgring – Cup 2	KKrämer Racing	1	1	0	0	1	—N/a	**1st**
2022	Nürburgring Langstrecken-Serie – SP9 Pro-Am	Team GetSpeed Performance	1	0	0	0	0	0	NC
2022	International GT Open – Pro-Am	GetSpeed Performance	10	0	0	1	3	45	6th
2023	IMSA SportsCar Championship – LMP3	AWA	1	0	0	0	0	0	41st
2023	Porsche Endurance Trophy Nürburgring – Cup 2	KKrämer Racing	9	3	2	0	7	151.5	**1st**
2023	24 Hours of Nürburgring – Cup 2 Pro	KKrämer Racing	1	0	0	0	1	—N/a	**2nd**
2023–24	Middle East Trophy – 992	KKrämer Racing	1	0	0	0	1	32	NC
2024	Prototype Winter Series – Class 3	Mühlner Motorsport	1	0	0	0	0	2.14	20th
2024	Porsche Endurance Trophy Nürburgring – Cup 2	Mühlner Motorsport	7	0	0	0	4	69.5	9th
2024	24 Hours of Nürburgring – Cup 2 Pro	Mühlner Motorsport	1	0	0	0	0	—N/a	4th
2026	Nürburgring Langstrecken-Serie – SP9 Pro-Am	Gamota Racing	8	1	3	0	6	52	4th
2026	24 Hours of Nürburgring – Cup 2 Am	Mühlner Motorsport	1	0	0	0	1	—N/a	**2nd**
2026	24H Series – GT3	Gamota Racing	1	0	0	0	0	24	32nd

^{†} As Kranz was a guest driver, he was ineligible to score points.

=== Complete 24 Hours of Nürburgring results ===
Year	Team	Co-Drivers	Car	Class	Laps	Pos.	Class Pos.
2015	(Germany) Prosport-Performance GmbH	(Switzerland) Klaus Bauer (Australia) Richard Gartner (Germany) Andreas Patzelt	Porsche Cayman R	SP6	49	DNF	DNF
2017	(Belgium) Mühlner Motorsport	(United States) Peter Ludwig (Belgium) Bruno Beulen	Porsche Cayman GT4	SP10	51	DNF	DNF
2018	(Belgium) Mühlner Motorsport	(Germany) Tobias Müller (Germany) Timo Mölig (Germany) Michael Rebhan	Porsche Cayman GT4 Clubsport	Cup 3	122	28th	**1st**
2018	(Belgium) Mühlner Motorsport	(Germany) Marcel Hoppe (Germany) Jürgen von Gartzen (Germany) Sebastian von Gartzen	Porsche Cayman GT4 Clubsport	Cup 3	122	29th	**2nd**
2019	(Belgium) Mühlner Motorsport	(Germany) Marcel Hoppe (Canada) Mark J. Thomas (Germany) Sebastian von Gartzen	Porsche 911 GT3 Cup	SP7	149	14th	**1st**
2019	(Belgium) Mühlner Motorsport	(Germany) Thorsten Jung (Germany) Michael Rebhan (Germany) Alexander Schula	Porsche Cayman GT4 Clubsport MR	Cup 3	135	46th	4th
2021	(Germany) GetSpeed Performance	(Finland) Markus Palttala (United States) John Shoffner (Belgium) Maxime Soulet	Mercedes-AMG GT3 Evo	SP9; Pro-Am	58	14th	4th
2022	(Germany) KKrämer Racing	(Germany) Christopher Brück (Germany) Karsten Krämer (Germany) Alexey Vermenko	Porsche 911 GT3 Cup (992)	Cup 2	151	15th	**1st**
2023	(Germany) KKrämer Racing	(Germany) Michele Di Martino (Germany) Herbert Lösch (Germany) Noah Nagelsdiek	Porsche 911 GT3 Cup (992)	Cup2; Pro	149	22nd	**2nd**
2024	(Belgium) Mühlner Motorsport	(United Kingdom) Alex Brundle (Germany) Ben Bünnagel (Germany) Michael Rebhan	Porsche 911 GT3 Cup (992)	Cup2; Pro	48	23rd	4th
2024	(Belgium) Mühlner Motorsport	(United Kingdom) Alex Brundle (Germany) Peter Terting (Germany) Tobias Vazquez-Garcia	Porsche 911 GT3 Cup (992)	Cup2; Pro	1	DNF	DNF
2026	(Belgium) Mühlner Motorsport	(Hungary) Adam Benko (Hungary) Csaba Walter (Slovakia) Antal Zsigó	Porsche 911 GT3 Cup (992.1)	Cup2; Am	145	21st	**2nd**

=== Complete Le Mans Cup results ===
(key) (Races in bold indicate pole position; results in italics indicate fastest lap)

Year	Entrant	Class	Chassis	1	2	3	4	5	6	7	Rank	Points
2020	Mühlner Motorsport	LMP3	Duqueine M30 - D08	RIC; 4	SPA; 11	LEC; 11	LMS; 1; 7	LMS; 2; 12	MNZ; Ret	POR; 2	9th	34.5
2021	Mühlner Motorsport	LMP3	Duqueine M30 - D08	BAR	LEC	MNZ	LMS; 1; 18	**LMS**; **2**; 1	SPA	POR	18th	16.5

=== Complete WeatherTech SportsCar Championship results ===
(key) (Races in bold indicate pole position) (Races in italics indicate fastest lap)

Year	Team	Class	Make	Engine	1	2	3	4	5	6	7	Rank	Points
2021	Mühlner Motorsports America	LMP3	Duqueine D-08	Nissan VK56DE 5.6 L V8	**DAY**; 3	SEB	MOH	WGL	WGL	ELK	PET	NC	0
2022	Mühlner Motorsports America	LMP3	Duqueine D-08	Nissan VK56 V8 5.6L V8	DAY; 9	SEB	MOH	WGL	MOS	ELK	ATL	NC	0
2023	AWA	LMP3	Duqueine D-08	Nissan VK56 V8 5.6L V8	DAY; 4	SEB	WGL	MOS	ELK	IMS	ATL	41st	0

=== Complete International GT Open results ===
(key) (Races in bold indicate pole position) (Races in italics indicate fastest lap)

Year	Team	Car	Class	1	2	3	4	5	6	7	8	9	10	11	12	13	Pos.	Points
2022	GetSpeed Performance	Mercedes-AMG GT3 Evo	Pro-Am	EST; 1; 6	EST; 2; 4	LEC; 1; 8	LEC; 2; 4	SPA; 5	HUN; 1; 3	HUN; 2; 2	RBR; 1; 4	RBR; 2; 2	MNZ; 1; 5	MNZ; 2 WD	CAT; 1	CAT; 2	6th	45
