= Vincent Kolb =

German racing driver (born 1995)

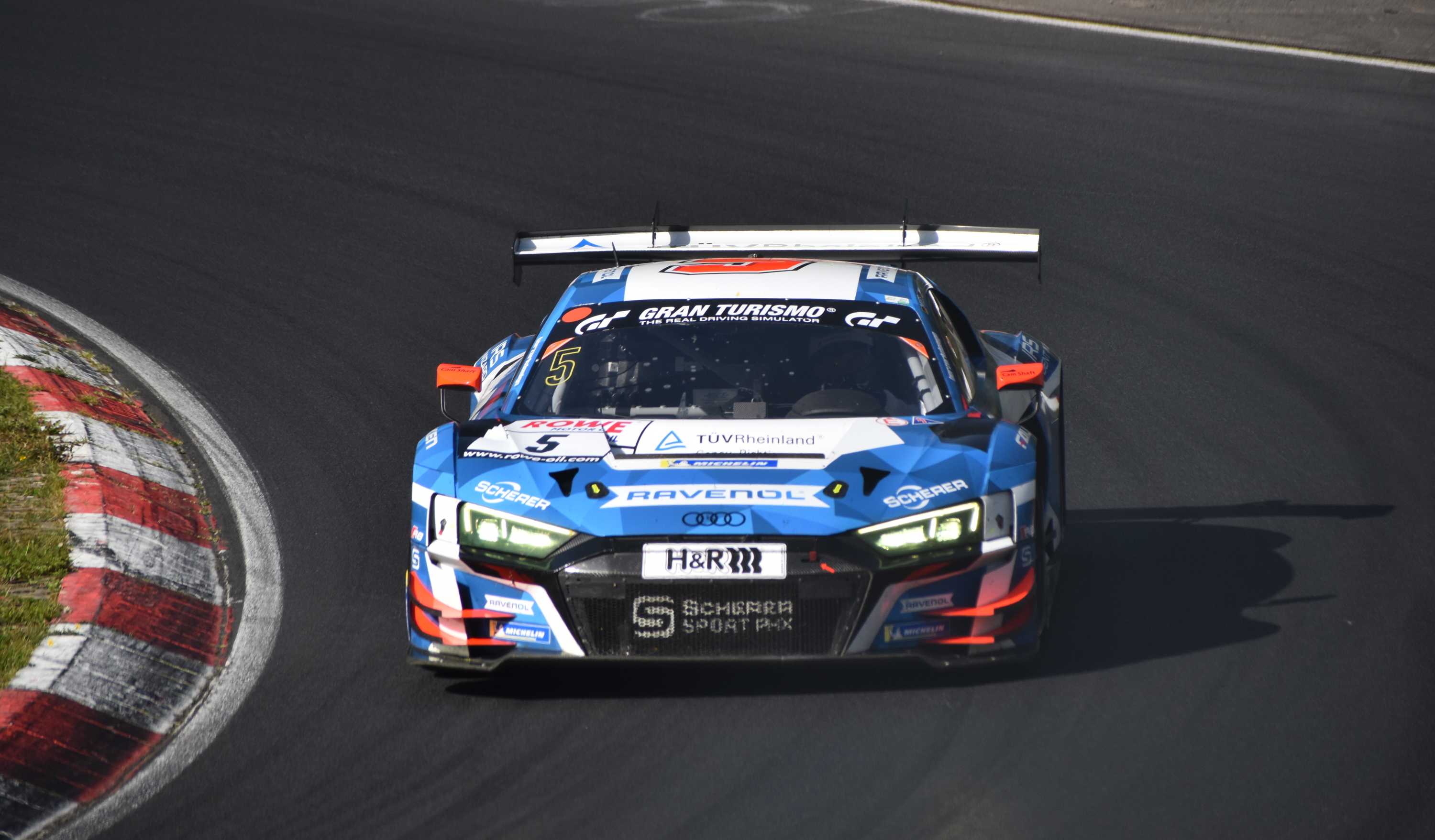
- Kolb's Scherer Sport PHX Audi in 2023
- Nationality: (Germany) German
- Born: 27 April 1995 (age 31) Frankfurt, Germany
- Categorisation: FIA Silver

Championship titles
- 2021: Nürburgring Langstrecken-Serie – SP9 Pro

Vincent A. Kolb (born 27 April 1995) is a German racing driver who last competed in the Nürburgring Langstrecken-Serie for HRT Ford Racing. In 2021, Kolb was crowned SP9 Pro champion for Phoenix Racing, sharing an Audi R8 LMS Evo with Frank Stippler.

Kolb is an ambassador for Recaro since 2021.

== Personal life ==
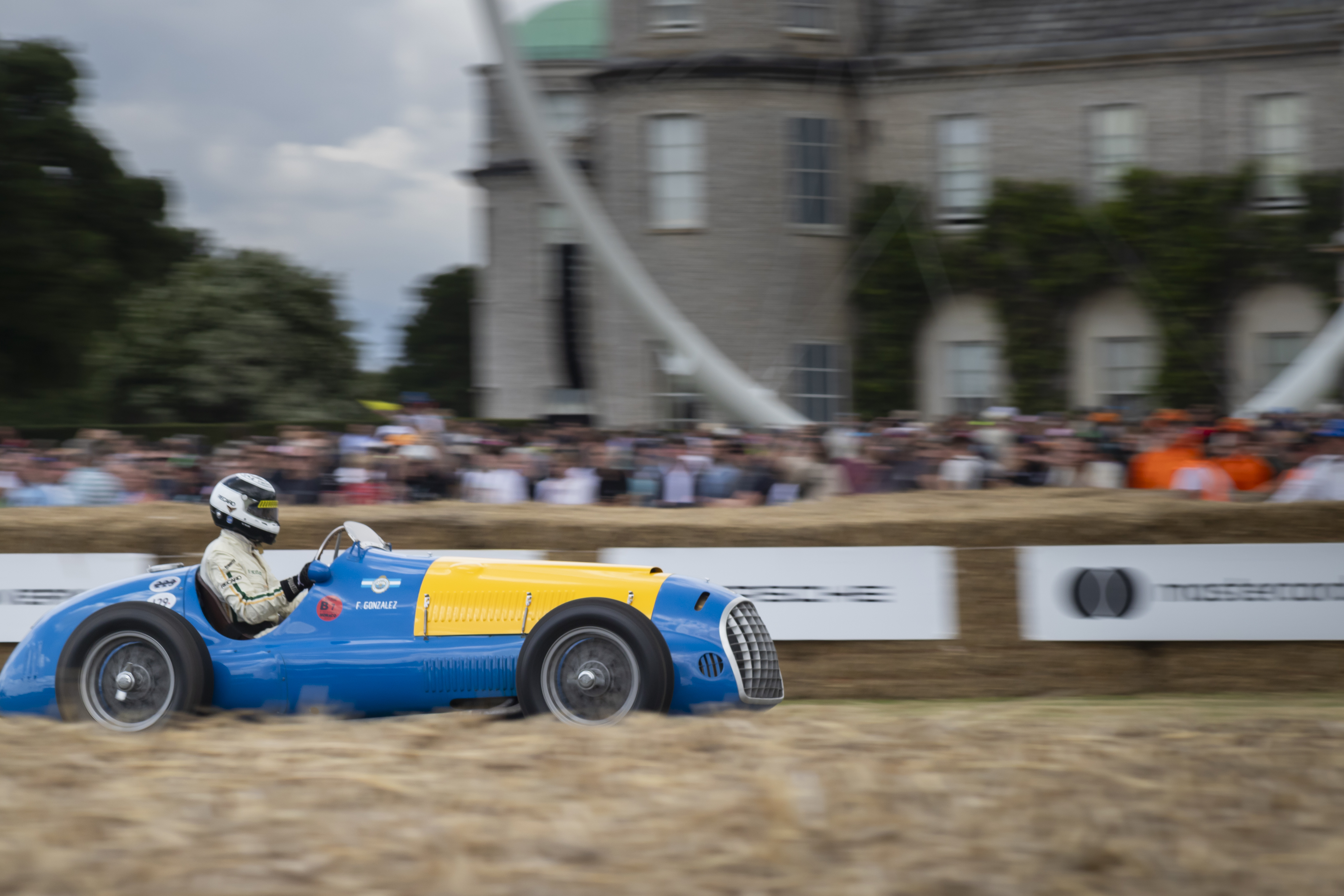
Kolb driving a Ferrari 166 FL at Goodwood in 2024.

Kolb is the son of German entrepreneur and former racing driver Alexander Kolb, who was a regular competitor in the Nürburgring Langstrecken-Serie. Kolb's brothers Julius-Ferdinand and Carl-Friedrich are also racing drivers who have competed in the NLS.

Alongside his racing career, Kolb studied Business Administration in Munich and London between 2014 and 2019.

== Career ==
Kolb started attending his father's races in the early 2000s, entered the Nürburgring Driving Academy at age 14, and began appearing in track days at 16, before eventually making his VLN Series debut in late 2013. Continuing in the lower classes of the VLN for the next four seasons, Kolb most notably took an SP7 class win in the second qualifying race for the 2014 24 Hours of Nürburgring.

In 2018, Kolb graduated to GT3 competition, driving an Audi R8 LMS Evo for Phoenix Racing in the top class of the VLN Series, as a member of the new Phoenix junior programme. In his rookie season, Kolb finished second outright at VLN3 alongside Audi factory driver Frank Stippler, before scoring an SP9 Pro podium and finishing fourth overall the following race. Continuing with Phoenix for 2019, Kolb scored two overall podiums with Stippler, an SP9 Pro-Am win with Steve Jans, and seventh place at the 24 Hours of Nürburgring with Jeroen Bleekemolen, Kim-Luis Schramm and Stippler. That year, Kolb also made a one-off appearance for Porsche-fielding Herberth Motorsport in the 24H GT Series, in which he won the 24 Hours of Barcelona in A6 Am.

Following a quiet season with Phoenix in 2020 in the newly-renamed Nürburgring Langstrecken-Serie, Kolb bounced back by taking five overall podiums and winning NLS9 alongside Stippler to clinch the SP9 Pro title in 2021. In his title-defending season with Phoenix in 2022, Kolb took six podiums to finish runner-up in SP9 Pro, before slipping to fifth in 2023 with two podiums to his name. Returning to Herberth to drive a Porsche 911 GT3 R (992) in 2024, Kolb primarily raced at the Nürburgring, but most notably won the 24 Hours of Portimão overall and in GT3 Pro-Am.

After racing with Herberth at the Dubai 24 Hour in early 2025, Kolb switched to HRT Ford Performance on his return to NLS. Racing for the majority of the season in SP9 Pro, Kolb took four podiums and won NLS8 alongside Stippler to give the Ford Mustang GT3 its first overall win in the series. At the beginning of 2026, Kolb competed in the UAE leg of the 24H Series Middle East for Herberth Motorsport, in which he won the 6 Hours of Abu Dhabi in GT3 Pro-Am en route to runner-up honours in class. For the rest of the year, Kolb returned to HRT Ford Racing to compete in the NLS, a season in which he scored a lone overall podium at NLS3.

== Racing record ==
=== Racing career summary ===
Season	Series	Team	Races	Wins	Poles	F/Laps	Podiums	Points	Position
2013	VLN Series – Cup 4								
2013	VLN Series – V5	Black Falcon Team TMD Friction							
2014	VLN Series – SP7								
2014	24 Hours of Nürburgring – V6	Black Falcon Team TMD Friction	1	0	0	0	0	—N/a	4th
2015	VLN Series – SP7		3	0	0	0	0		
2015	24 Hours of Nürburgring – SP7		1	0	0	0	0	—N/a	10th
2016	VLN Series – V5	Black Falcon							
2017	VLN Series – Cup 2								
2017	24 Hours of Nürburgring – SP7	Goder	1	0	0	0	0	—N/a	5th
2018	VLN Series – SP9 Pro	Phoenix Racing	5	0	0	0	2	13.69	17th
2018	Spa Six Hours Classic – GTS12		1	0	0	0	0	—N/a	12th
2019	VLN Series – SP9 Pro	Phoenix Racing	6	0	0	0	2	32.21	4th
2019	VLN Series – SP9 Pro-Am	Phoenix Racing	2	1	0	0	2	16	11th
2019	24 Hours of Nürburgring – SP9	Phoenix Racing	1	0	0	0	0	—N/a	7th
2019	24H GT Series – A6 Pro	Phoenix Racing	1	0	0	0	0	17	12th
2019	24H GT Series Continents – A6 Am	Herberth Motorsport	1	1	0	0	1	20	170th
2019	DMV Dunlop 60 – Class 1		2	0	0	0	2	15.09	15th
2020	Nürburgring Langstrecken-Serie – SP9 Pro	Phoenix Racing	4	0	0	0	0	11.24	46th
2020	24H GT Series Continents – GT3 Pro	Herberth Motorsport	1	0	0	0	0	7	NC
2020	Sixties Endurance Series		1	0	0	0	0	34	44th
2021	24H GT Series Continents – GT3 Pro	Herberth Motorsport	1	0	0	0	0	0	NC
2021	Nürburgring Langstrecken-Serie – SP9 Pro	Phoenix Racing	8	1	1	0	5	51.96	1st
2021	24 Hours of Nürburgring – SP9	Phoenix-IronForce Racing	1	0	0	0	0	—N/a	11th
2021	Spa Six Hours Classic – GTS12		1	0	0	0	0	—N/a	6th
2022	Nürburgring Langstrecken-Serie – SP9 Pro	Scherer Sport Team Phoenix	8	0	3	0	6	64	2nd
2022	24 Hours of Nürburgring – SP9 Pro	Scherer Sport Team Phoenix	1	0	0	0	0	—N/a	DNF
2023	Nürburgring Langstrecken-Serie – SP9 Pro	Scherer Sport PHX	7	0	0	0	2	10	5th
2023	24 Hours of Nürburgring – SP9 Pro	Scherer Sport PHX	1	0	0	0	0	—N/a	DNF
2024	Nürburgring Langstrecken-Serie – SP9 Pro	Herberth Motorsport	4	0	0	0	0	0	NC
2024	24 Hours of Nürburgring – SP9 Pro	Herberth Motorsport	1	0	0	0	0	—N/a	13th
2024	Intercontinental GT Challenge	Herberth Motorsport	1	0	0	0	0	0	NC
2024	24H Series – GT3 Pro-Am	Herberth Motorsport	1	1	0	0	1	60	6th
2025	Middle East Trophy – GT3 Am	Herberth Motorsport	1	0	0	0	0	24	NC
2025	Nürburgring Langstrecken-Serie – SP9 Pro	HRT Ford Performance	6	1	0	0	4	13	NC
2025	24 Hours of Nürburgring – SP9 Pro-Am	HRT Ford Performance	1	0	0	0	0	—N/a	DNF
2025	ADAC 1000 Km Rennen Nürburgring		1	0	0	0	1	—N/a	3rd
2025–26	24H Series Middle East – GT3 Pro-Am	Herberth Motorsport	2	1	0	0	2	94	2nd
2026	Nürburgring Langstrecken-Serie – SP9 Pro	HRT Ford Racing	5	0	0	0	2	17	NC
2026	24 Hours of Nürburgring – SP9 Pro-Am	HRT Ford Racing	1	0	0	0	0	—N/a	DNF
2026	Intercontinental GT Challenge	HRT Ford Racing	1	0	0	0	0	0	NC
2026	24H Series – GT3 Pro-Am	Herberth Motorsport	1	0	0	0	0	8	39th

^{†} As Kolb was a guest driver, he was ineligible to score points.

=== Complete 24 Hours of Nürburgring results ===
Year	Team	Co-Drivers	Car	Class	Laps	Pos.	Class Pos.
2014	(Germany) Black Falcon Team TMD Friction	(Germany) Alexander Kolb (Germany) Julius-Ferdinand Kolb (Germany) Helmut Weber	Porsche 991 Cup	V6	135	45th	4th
2015		(United Kingdom) Didier Denat (Germany) Thomas König (Switzerland) Lorenzo Rocco	Porsche 997 Cup	SP7	132	32nd	10th
2017	(Germany) Goder	(Germany) Tim Scheerbarth (Germany) Georg Goder (Germany) Martin Schluter	Porsche 991 GT3 Cup	SP7	130	61st	5th
2019	(Germany) Phoenix Racing	(Netherlands) Jeroen Bleekemolen (Germany) Kim-Luis Schramm (Germany) Frank Stippler	Audi R8 LMS Evo	SP9	154	7th	7th
2021	(Germany) Phoenix-IronForce Racing	(Austria) Max Hofer (Germany) Dennis Marschall (Germany) Jan-Erik Slooten	Audi R8 LMS Evo	SP9	58	11th	11th
2022	(Germany) Scherer Sport Team Phoenix	(Switzerland) Ricardo Feller (South Africa) Kelvin van der Linde (Netherlands) Renger van der Zande	Audi R8 LMS Evo II	SP9; Pro	57	DNF	DNF
2023	(Germany) Scherer Sport PHX	(United Kingdom) Alexander Sims (Germany) Frank Stippler (Netherlands) Renger van der Zande	Audi R8 LMS Evo II	SP9; Pro	80	DNF	DNF
2024	(Germany) Herberth Motorsport	(Australia) Matt Campbell (Norway) Dennis Olsen (Germany) Robert Renauer	Porsche 911 GT3 R (992)	SP9; Pro	49	16th	13th
2025	(Germany) HRT Ford Performance	(Germany) Hubert Haupt (Germany) Patrick Assenheimer (Germany) Dirk Müller	Ford Mustang GT3	SP9; Pro-Am	52	DNF	DNF
2026	(Germany) HRT Ford Racing	(Netherlands) Colin Caresani (Germany) Hubert Haupt (Germany) David Schumacher	Ford Mustang GT3 Evo	SP9 Pro-Am	60	DNF	DNF
