= Nürburgring Langstrecken-Serie =

Auto racing championship in Germany

- Country: Germany
- Inaugural season: 1977
- Official website: www.nuerburgring-langstrecken-serie.de

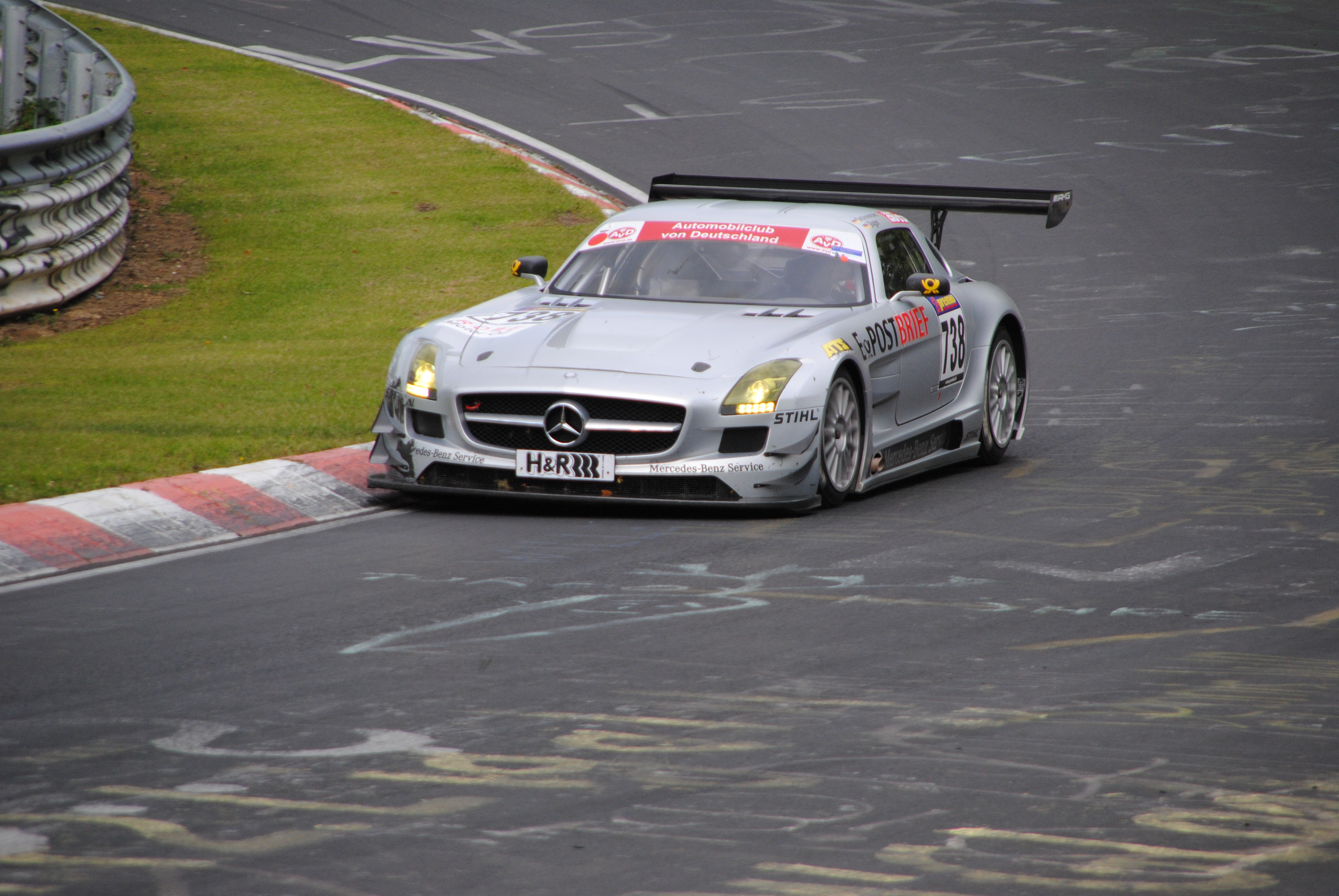
Mercedes-Benz SLS AMG GT3 on the Nürburgring

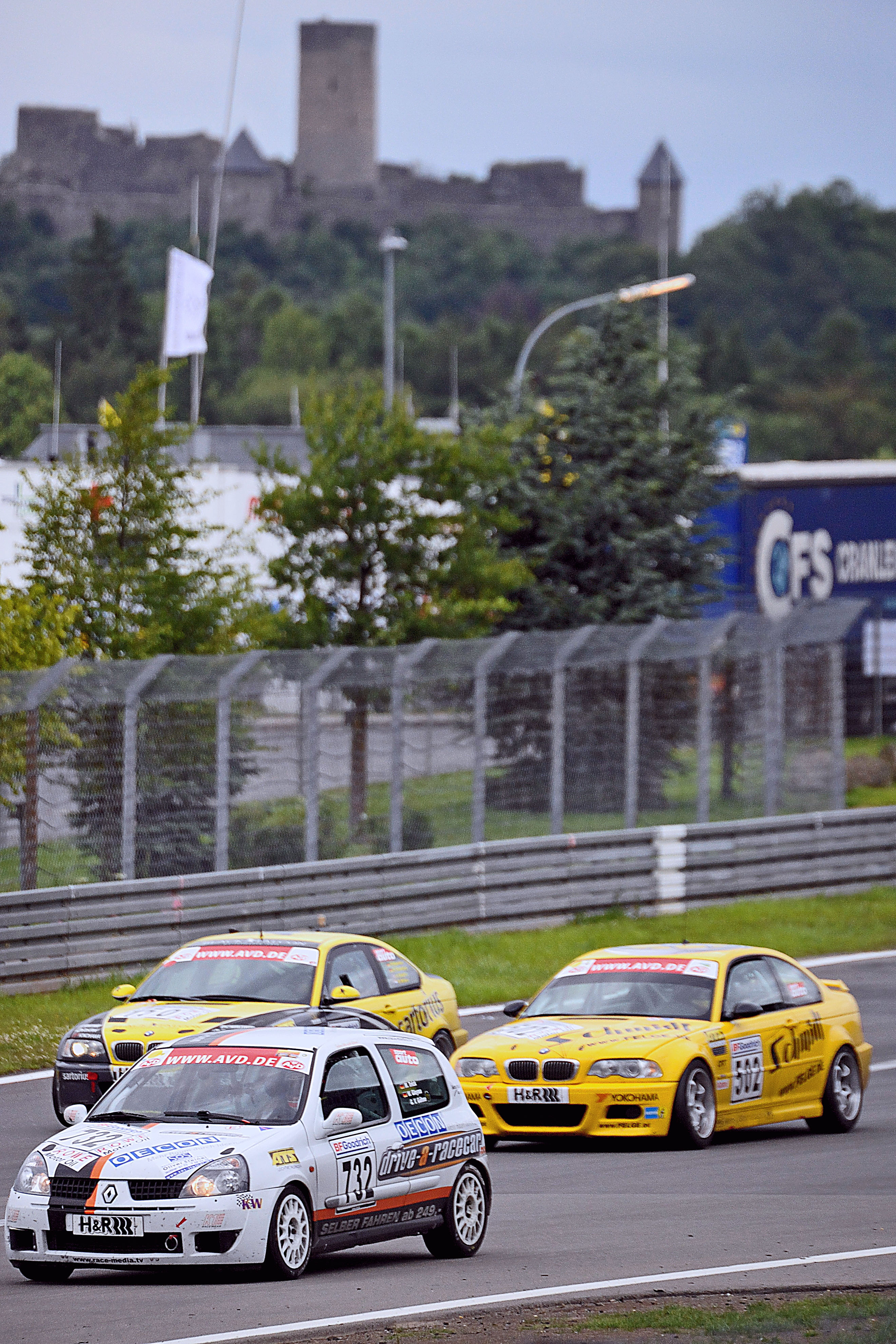
Touring cars passing in front of the Nürburg castle in 2009

The Nürburgring Langstrecken-Serie (NLS) is a motorsport series consisting of nine endurance races held on the Nürburgring Nordschleife, each hosted by a different ADAC club. Until 2020, it was known as the VLN Series.

Participants of NLS races range from amateurs in small road-legal cars with rollcages and harnesses to professional factory teams racing Group GT3 cars. The NLS series is closely associated with the Nürburgring 24 Hours, as for the most part it has similar rules, and mainly the same participants. In the calendar, several weeks around the 24h date in May/June are taken off to allow teams to prepare for the 24h, and to fix their cars afterwards. However, the 24h is no longer a part of the championship.

The championship is known for its large quantity of cars as well as its variety, with an average of 113 cars starting per race in 2023.

== Name ==
The series was formed as "Valvoline Langstreckenpokal Nürburgring" from 1977 until the end of 1980. For 1981 until the end of the 2000 season "Veedol Langstreckenpokal Nürburgring" was chosen.

It was known as "BFGoodrich Langstreckenmeisterschaft (BFGLM)" from 2001 to 2009, and VLN (German: Veranstaltergemeinschaft Langstreckenpokal Nürburgring, "Association of Nürburgring Endurance Cup Organisers") from 2009 until 2020.

In 2020, the series was rebranded as NLS ("Nürburgring Langstrecken-Serie").

== History ==
The VLN was founded in 1977 by several motorsport clubs, which are members of ADAC or Deutscher Motorsport Verband (DMV), in order to join forces. Previously, each club had run its own touring car racing event on the Nürburgring, lasting for 3.5 to 6 hours, with about 150 cars and 400 drivers taking part. The rules were unified and the races were made part of a series.

The winners of the series were awarded a Cup (German: Pokal), sponsored by Valvoline and later Veedol lubrication products. Due to this, both organisation and races were simply informally called "Veedol-Cup" for many years. Since the change of sponsorship and the official recognition by Deutscher Motor Sport Bund (DMSB) as the German endurance championship (German: Meisterschaft) in 2001, the former Veedol Langstreckenpokal Nürburgring was the BFGoodrich Langstreckenmeisterschaft Nürburgring. The championship was renamed the NLS in 2020, however the name of the VLN organisation stays the same.

Apart from the 24 Hours, the Rundstrecken Challenge Nürburgring (RCN/CHC) and GLP are related smaller events dedicated to non-professionals.

In late 2023, the series' rightholders and the Nürburgring operator began a legal battle over race dates for 2024, and the AvD planned to launch a rival Nürburgring-based series. The 2024 season spanned eight races over six weekends, including the 24h qualifying races. The 2025 season features ten races over eight weekends, including the 24h qualifying races and a new NLS Light race.

== Races ==
Each NLS race is held as a "one-day event" on Saturdays only, in order to limit costs. The mandatory drivers briefing is at 07:30, qualifying is from 08:30 to 10:00. Following a warm-up lap behind safety cars, the first of three groups starts the race at 12:00, followed by the other two a few minutes later, in time before the fastest cars complete their first lap in just over 8 minutes. After parc fermé is opened and the winners are honoured, the teams can travel home on race day. At some events, the schedule also accommodates additional sprint races of visiting other series, mainly classic cars and youngtimers.

The "Nürburgring 6 Hours" is considered the season highlight – in 1998, even Sir Jack Brabham took part, at age 72. Here, 2 to 4 drivers per cars are entered, while in all others races, a single driver can drive all alone for 4 hours, or up to 3 can form a team. There are two other standout races – the NLS-6 "Barbarossapreis", in which Michael Schumacher's success with Scuderia Ferrari in Formula One is honoured with all podium placegetters receiving red wigs; and the NLS-9 "Münsterlandpokal" or "Schinkenrennen" (ham race), where large pieces of ham from the Münsterland area are presented to class winners.

Most of the fans watch the race on the Nordschleife. To get to the favourite viewing points it is often necessary to take a walk. Several sections, including "Adenauer Forst", "Karussell", and "Wippermann", are up to a kilometre away from the nearest main road. Easy to reach and always well attended are sections such as "Breidscheid", "Brünnchen", and "Pflanzgarten". Around most of the Nordschleife no entrance fee is raised. A ticket for the price of €20 is needed for access to the paddock and grid walk, the grandstands on the Grand Prix circuit of the Nürburgring, and two spectator areas at the Nordschleife.

== Car classes ==
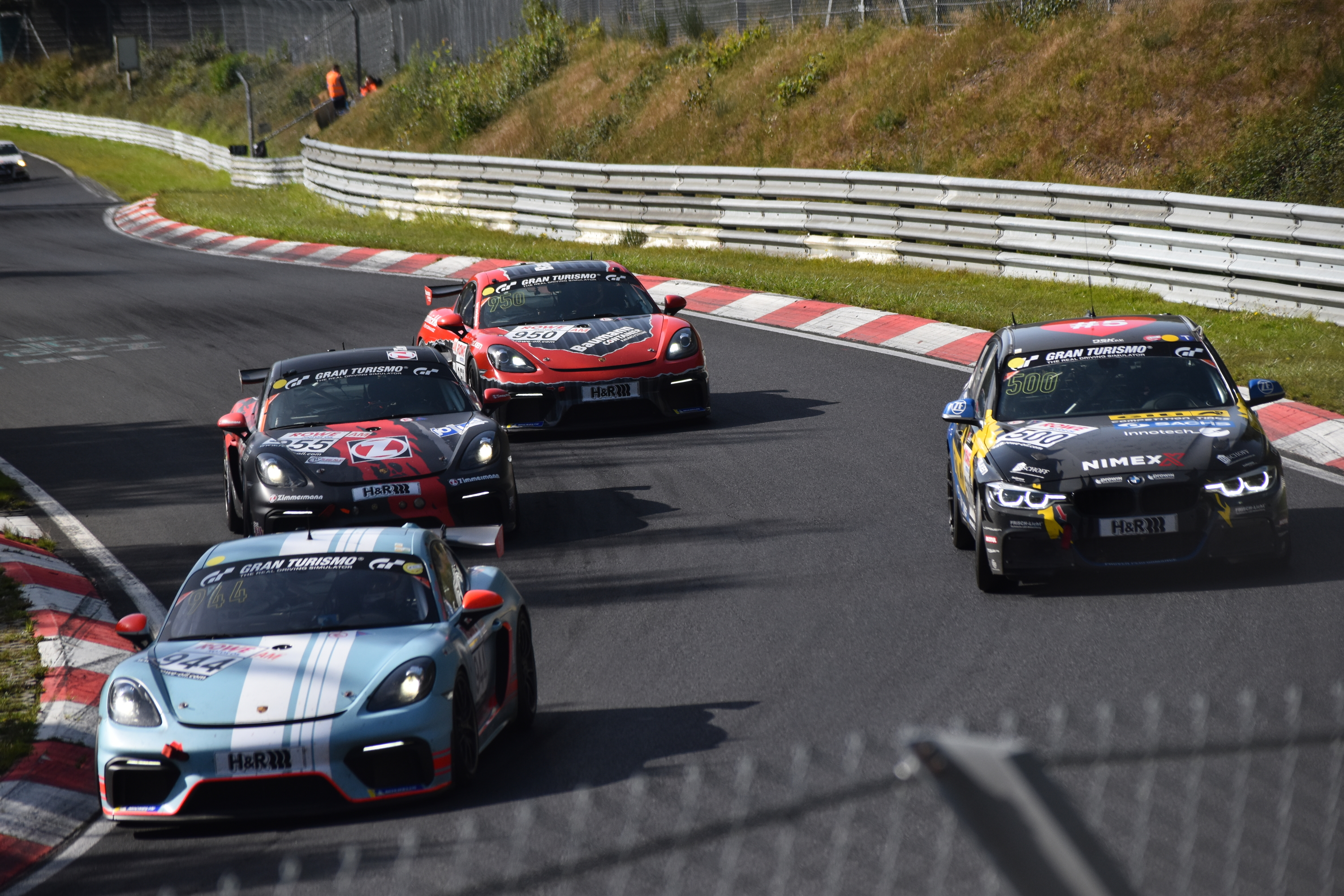
Three Porsche Cayman GT4 Clubsport overtaking a VT2 BMW 328i

A variety of cars compete at the same time during each race. In the 2023 season, cars in 22 classes competed in at least one race. Most of them can be classified in the following groups:

- The VLN production cars group is intended to allow relatively low cost racing with near-series cars. It consists of several classes of normally-aspirated cars (V3 to V6), several classes of turbo-charged cars (VT1 to VT3, with separate classes for front-wheel drive cars), plus one class for hybrids (VT Hybrid) and one class for electric cars (VT Elektro).
- The 24h-Special group consists of pure race cars that may compete in other race series. It consists of the classes SP1 to SP8 differentiated by engine displacement with an optional suffix T for turbo charged engines, the SP9 class for FIA GT3 cars, the SP10 class for SRO GT4 cars, plus the SP-Pro class for prototype racecars over 3000cc, SP-X for "special vehicles" and AT (-G) for vehicles using alternative fuel sources.
- The H (historic) group consists of cars made in 2008 and before. It consists of the classes H2 (up to 1999cc) and H4 (2000 to 6250cc).

A large portion of the field is made of TCR and Cup classes (BMW M240i, BMW M2 CS, Porsche 911 GT3 Cup, Porsche Cayman GT4 Clubsport) that do not fit in specific groups.

== Safety ==
A Code 60 flag

Due to the length of the track and championship's format, the NLS has unusual safety procedures compared to other modern professional racing series. Safety cars are not used, double yellow flags indicate a local speed limit of 120 km/h, and code 60 flags, used locally for conditions warranting a safety car on shorter tracks, limit the speed to 60 km/h. It is common for course cars and vehicle recovery trucks to travel around the course under local double yellow flags.

Closing speeds between the fastest and slowest car classes is a common concern, as the track has many blind crests and corners.

=== Fatalities ===
Five drivers have died in accidents while racing in the NLS: Wolfgang Offermann in 1986, Wolfgang Scholz in 1998, Carola Biehler in 2000, Leo Löwenstein in 2010, and Juha Miettinen in 2026. Two drivers have died of heart attacks at the wheel, Stefan Eickelmann in 1998 and two-time champion Wolf Silvester in 2013. One marshal and one spectator have died after being hit by a car in 1977 and 2015 respectively.

== Championship standings and trophies ==
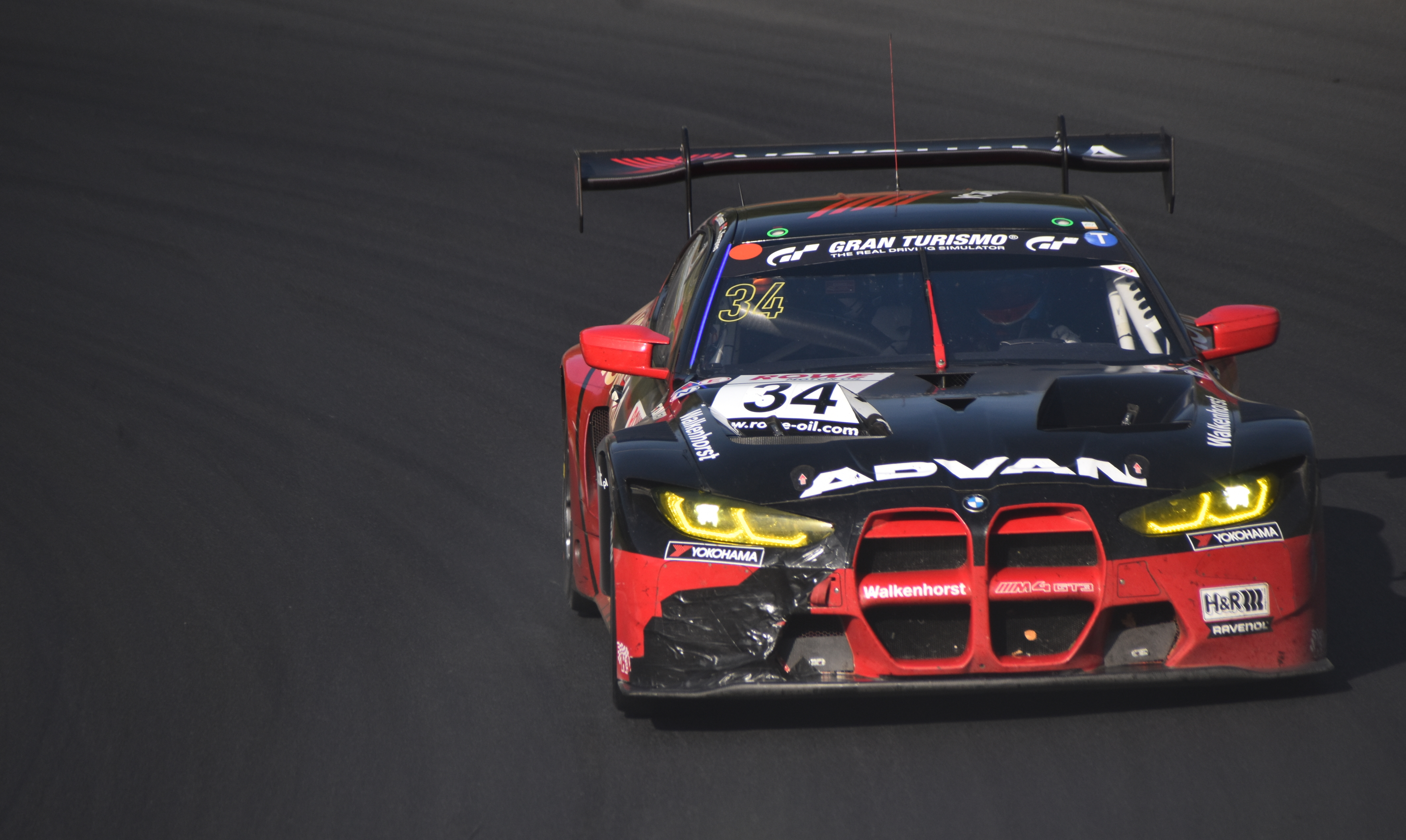
Current teams champions, #34 Walkenhorst Motorsport

The NLS has the particularity of awarding its main championship, the drivers championship, based on group positions rather than overall positions. This means that championship contenders very often do not contend for overall wins or podiums, and do not race directly against each other. As of 2023, the last four drivers championships were won by entries in the slower production cars group, while drivers piloting entry level hatchbacks such as the Renault Clio, Opel Corsa or Suzuki Swift have won the championship in the past.

There is however an overall teams' championship, named NLS Speed-Trophy, based on overall results only, meaning that it is contested by the faster SP9 (GT3), or Cup 2 (Porsche 992 GT3) classes. Other trophies such as the Junior or Ladies trophy follow the same format as the drivers championship, while each class has its own individual drivers and teams championship.

== Member organisations ==
- ADAC-Westfalen e.V.
- Renngemeinschaft Düren e.V. DMV
- AC Altkreis Schwelm e.V. im ADAC
- MSC Adenau e.V. im ADAC
- Dortmunder MC e.V. im ADAC
- Rheydter Club für Motorsport e.V. DMV
- MSC Ruhr-Blitz Bochum e.V. im ADAC
- MSC Sinzig e.V. im ADAC
- AC Monheim e.V. DMV
- MSC Münster e.V. DMV

== Champions ==
=== Drivers' Classifications ===
==== Gesamtwertung (Overall) ====
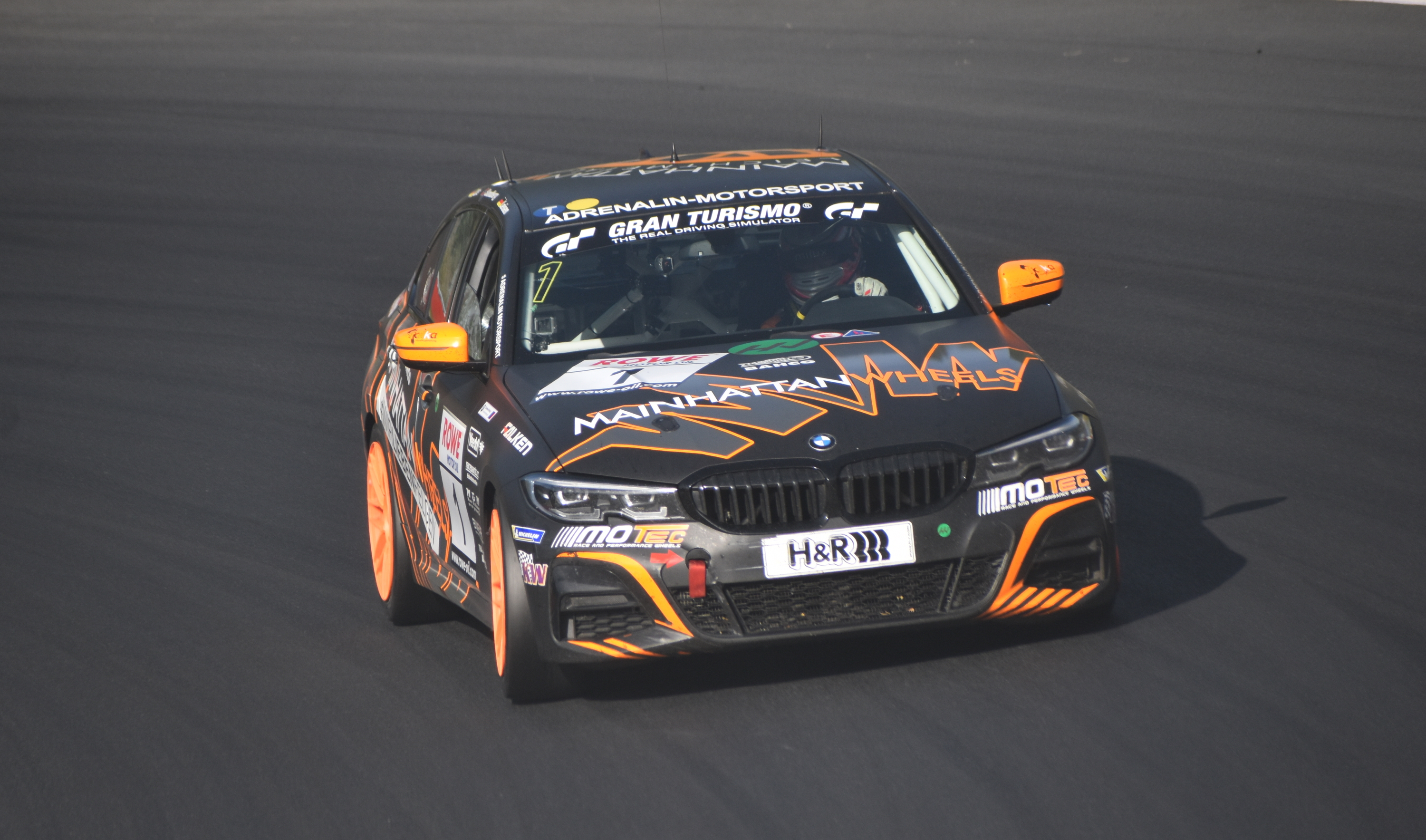
2023 drivers champions, Philipp Leisen, Oskar Sandberg and Daniel Zils (#1 Adrenalin Motorsport Team Motec)

Year	Driver(s)	Car	Team	Manufacturer
1977	(West Germany) Ernst Thierfelder	Simca Rallye	(West Germany) ETH Tuning (1)	(France) Simca
1978	(West Germany) Hans Weisgerber	BMW 2002 (1)	(West Germany) MSTC Erbach	(West Germany) BMW
1979	(West Germany) Wolfgang Kudrass (West Germany) Norbert Schiffbauer	Audi 50	(West Germany) Veytal Tuning	(West Germany) Audi
1980	(West Germany) Johannes Scheid	Autobianchi A112	(West Germany) Scheid-Motorsport (1)	(Italy) Autobianchi
1981	(West Germany) Johannes Scheid (2) (West Germany) Reinhold Köster	Fiat 127 Sport	(West Germany) Scheid-Motorsport (2)	(Italy) Fiat
1982	(West Germany) Arno Wester (West Germany) Walter Jirak	Volkswagen Golf GTi (1)	(West Germany) Tannenkamp Motorsport	(West Germany) Volkswagen
1983	(West Germany) Karl-Heinz Schäfer	Opel Kadett GT/E (1)	(West Germany) Mich Tuning (1)	(West Germany) Opel
1984	(West Germany) Heinrich Sprungmann (West Germany) Dierk Meyer	Volkswagen Golf GTi (2)	(West Germany) VAG Sprungmann Essen	(West Germany) Volkswagen
1985	(West Germany) Karl-Heinz Kuhlendahl	Volkswagen Scirocco (3)	(West Germany) Nothelle Motorsport	(West Germany) Volkswagen
1986	(West Germany) Herbert Kummle	Ford Escort RS2000	(West Germany) Pontus Racing	(United States) Ford
1987	(West Germany) Ludwig Nett (West Germany) Jürgen Nett	Peugeot 205 GTi	(West Germany) Nett Tuning (2)	(France) Peugeot
1988	(West Germany) Wolfgang Schrey (West Germany) Günter Schrey	Mercedes-Benz 190E 2.3-16	(West Germany) Team Matter Sicherheit	(West Germany) Mercedes-Benz
1989	(West Germany) Lutz-Wilhelm Höhl	Volkswagen Polo Coupé (4)	(West Germany) Veytal Tuning	(West Germany) Volkswagen
1990	(Germany) Heinz-Otto Fritzsche(1) (Germany) Jürgen Fritzsche (1)	Opel Kadett GSi 16V (2)	(Germany) Mantzel Tuning (1)	(Germany) Opel
1991	(Germany) Heinz-Otto Fritzsche(2) (Germany) Jürgen Fritzsche (2)	Opel Kadett GSi 16V (3)	(Germany) Mantzel Tuning (2)	(Germany) Opel
1992	(Germany) Dirk Adorf (Germany) Guido Thierfelder	Citroën AX Sport	(Germany) ETH Tuning (2)	(France) Citroën
1993	(Germany) Heinz-Otto Fritzsche(3) (Germany) Roland Senge	Opel Astra GSi 16V (4)	(Germany) Kissling Motorsport (1)	(Germany) Opel
1994	(Germany) Johannes Scheid (3) (Germany) Hans Widmann	BMW M3 (2)	(Germany) Scheid-Motorsport (1)	(Germany) BMW
1995	(Germany) Johannes Scheid (5) (Germany) Hans Widmann (2)	BMW M3 (3)	(Germany) Scheid-Motorsport (2)	(Germany) BMW
1996	(Germany) Dirk Adorf (Germany) Thomas Winkelhock	Opel Astra GSi 16V (5)	(Germany) Günther Müller Sports	(Germany) Opel
1997	(Germany) Dirk Adorf (2) (Germany) Heinz-Josef "Juppi" Bermes	Opel Astra GSi 16V (6)	(Belgium) Mühlner Motorsport	(Germany) Opel
1998	(Germany) Johannes Scheid (6) (Germany) Sabine Reck	BMW M3 (4)	(Germany) Scheid-Motorsport (3)	(Germany) BMW
1999	(Germany) Peter Zakowski (Germany) Hans-Jürgen Tiemann	Chrysler Viper	(Germany) Zakspeed Racing	(United States) Dodge
2000	(Germany) Jens Lührsen (Germany) Uwe Unteroberdörster	Suzuki Swift	(Germany) Fleper-Motorsport	(Japan) Suzuki
2001	(Germany) Klaus-Peter Thaler (Germany) Heinz Remmen	Opel Astra GSi 16V (7)	(Germany) Kissling Motorsport (2)	(Germany) Opel
2002	(Germany) Mario Merten	BMW 318iS (5)	(Germany) Bonk Motorsport	(Germany) BMW
2003	(Germany) Heinz-Otto Fritzsche (4) (Germany) Jürgen Fritzsche (3)	Opel Corsa C (8)	(Germany) Kissling Motorsport (3)	(Germany) Opel
2004	(Germany) Arnd Meier (Germany) René Wolff	BMW 318iS (6)	(Germany) SAX Racing	(Germany) BMW
2005	(Germany) Claudia Hürtgen	BMW 320 (7)	(Germany) Schubert Motorsport	(Germany) BMW
2006	(Germany) Mario Merten (Germany) "Wolf Silvester" (Wolfgang Dess)	BMW 318iS (8)	(Germany) Bonk Motorsport (1)	(Germany) BMW
2007	(Germany) Heinz-Otto Fritzsche (5) (Germany) Jürgen Fritzsche (4) (Germany) Marco Wolf	Opel Astra (9)	(Germany) Kissling Motorsport (4)	(Germany) Opel
2008	(Germany) Alexander Böhm (1) (Germany) Matthias Unger	BMW 325i (9)	(Germany) Black Falcon (1)	(Germany) BMW
2009	(Germany) Alexander Böhm (2) (Republic of Ireland) Seán Paul Breslin (Germany) Christer Jöns	BMW 325i (10)	(Germany) Black Falcon (2)	(Germany) BMW
2010	(Germany) Mario Merten (Germany) "Wolf Silvester" (Wolfgang Dess)	BMW Z4 (11)	(Germany) Bonk Motorsport (2)	(Germany) BMW
2011	(Germany) Carsten Knechtges (Germany) Manuel Metzger (Germany) Tim Scheerbarth	BMW Z4 (12)	(Germany) Black Falcon (3)	(Germany) BMW
2012	(Germany) Ulrich Andree (Germany) Dominik Brinkmann (Norway) Christian Krognes	Volkswagen Scirocco GT24 (5)	(Germany) LMS Engineering	(Germany) Volkswagen
2013	(Germany) Dirk Groneck (1) (Germany) Tim Groneck (1)	Renault Clio (1)	(Germany) Groneck Motorsport (1)	(France) Renault
2014	(Germany) Rolf Derscheid (Germany) Michael Flehmer	BMW 325i (13)	(Germany) Derscheid Motorsport	(Germany) BMW
2015	(Germany) Dirk Groneck (2) (Germany) Tim Groneck (2)	Renault Clio (2)	(Germany) Groneck Motorsport (2)	(France) Renault
2016	(Germany) Alexander Mies (Germany) Michael Schrey (1)	BMW M325i Racing Cup (14)	(Germany) Bonk Motorsport (3)	(Germany) BMW
2017	(Germany) Michael Schrey (2)	BMW M325i Racing Cup (15)	(Germany) Bonk Motorsport (4)	(Germany) BMW
2018	(Germany) Philipp Leisen (1) (Germany) Christopher Rink (1) (Germany) Danny Brink (1)	BMW 325i (16)	(Germany) Adrenalin Motorsport	(Germany) BMW
2019	(Germany) Yannick Fübrich (1) (Austria) David Griessner	BMW M240i Racing Cup (17)	(Germany) Adrenalin Motorsport (2)	(Germany) BMW
2020	(Germany) Philipp Leisen (2) (Germany) Christopher Rink (2) (Germany) Danny Brink (2)	BMW 325i (18)	(Germany) Adrenalin Motorsport (3)	(Germany) BMW
2021	(Germany) Philipp Leisen (3) (Germany) Danny Brink (3)	BMW 325i (19)	(Germany) Adrenalin Motorsport (4)	(Germany) BMW
2022	(Germany) Daniel Zils (Norway) Oskar Sandberg (Norway) Sindre Setsaas	BMW 330i (20)	(Germany) Adrenalin Motorsport (5)	(Germany) BMW
2023	(Germany) Daniel Zils (2) (Norway) Oskar Sandberg (2) (Germany) Philipp Leisen (4)	BMW 330i (21)	(Germany) Adrenalin Motorsport (6)	(Germany) BMW
2024	(United Kingdom) Toby Goodman (Germany) Sven Markert (1) (Switzerland) Ranko Mijatovic	BMW M240i Racing (22)	(Germany) Adrenalin Motorsport (7)	(Germany) BMW
2025	(Switzerland) Ranko Mijatovic (2) (Germany) Nick Wüstenhagen	BMW M4 GT4 (23)	(Germany) FK Performance Motorsport	(Germany) BMW
2026	(Italy) Edoardo Bugane (Germany) Yannick Fübrich (2) (Germany) Sven Markert (2)	BMW M240i Racing Cup (24)	(Germany) Adrenalin Motorsport (8)	(Germany) BMW

==== Klassensieger-Trophäe (Class) ====
Year	SP9 Pro	SP9 Premium	SP9 Masters	SP10	TCR	Cup2	Cup3
2018	(Germany) Frank Stippler	(Germany) Oliver Kainz (Germany) Jochen Krumbach (Germany) Georg Weiss	(Germany) Rudi Adams (Germany) Henry Walkenhorst (Germany) Andreas Ziegler	(Germany) Heiko Eichenberg (Switzerland) Yannick Mettler	(Germany) Andreas Gülden	(Germany) Marcel Hoppe (Germany) Moritz Kranz (Germany) Tim Scheerbarth	(Germany) 'Jens' (Germany) 'Max'
Year	SP9 Pro	SP9 Pro-Am	SP9 Am	SP10	TCR	Cup2	Cup3
2019	(Germany) Patrick Assenheimer	(Luxembourg) Steve Jans	(Germany) Michael Heimrich	(Germany) Tobias Müller (Germany) Tim Scheerbarth (Estonia) Tristan Viidas	(Germany) Matthias Wasel (Switzerland) Frédéric Yerly	(Germany) Marcel Hoppe (Germany) Moritz Kranz	(Germany) Marc Keilwerth (Argentina) Marcos Adolfo Vázquez
2020	(United Kingdom) David Pittard	(Germany) Marco Holzer (Germany) Patrick Kolb (Italy) Lorenzo Rocco Di Torrepadula	(Germany) Christian Kohlhaas	(Germany) Yannick Fübrich (Austria) David Griessner (Germany) Florian Naumann	(Germany) Heiko Hammel (Germany) Matthias Wasel	(Germany) Georg Goder (Germany) Martin Schlüter	(Germany) Thorsten Jung
2021	(Germany) Vincent Kolb	(Germany) Patrick Kolb (Italy) Lorenzo Rocco Di Torrepadula	(United Kingdom) Janine Shoffner	(Germany) Marcel Marchewicz	—N/a	(Germany) Ralf Oehme	(Germany) Daniel Blickle (Germany) Max Kronberg (Germany) Tim Scheerbarth
2022	(Poland) Kuba Giermaziak	(Italy) Lorenzo Rocco Di Torrepadula	(Germany) Friedrich von Bohlen	(Germany) Janis Waldow	(Denmark) Lars-Erik Nielsen (Denmark) Peter Hansen	(Germany) Daniel Blickle	(Switzerland) Mauro Calamia (Switzerland) Ivan Jacoma (Germany) Kai Riemer
2023	(Germany) Marcel Marchewicz	(Belgium) Maxime Dumarey	(Germany) Michael Heimrich (Italy) Lorenzo Rocco Di Torrepadula	(Germany) Thorsten Wolter (Germany) Nick Wüstenhagen	(Germany) Mike Halder (Switzerland) Roger Vögeli	(Germany) Christopher Brück (Germany) Moritz Kranz	(Germany) Heiko Eichenberg (Germany) Fabio Grosse (Switzerland) Patrik Grütter
2024	—N/a	(Germany) Michael Heimrich (Germany) Arno Klasen	(Germany) Michael Heimrich (Germany) Arno Klasen	(Germany) Tim Sandtler	(Norway) Håkon Schjærin	(Germany) Tobias Müller	(France) Joshua Bednarski (Denmark) Lucas Daugaard (Germany) Moritz Oberheim
2025	(Germany) Frank Stippler	(Kyrgyzstan) "Selv" (Germany) Alexey Veremenko	(Germany) 'Dieter Schmidtmann' (Germany) Christoph Breuer (Thailand) Kiki Sak Nana	(United Kingdom) Toby Goodman (Finland) Philip Miemois (Germany) Moritz Oberheim	(Germany) Danny Brink (Armenia) Artur Goroyan	(Germany) Arne Hoffmeister (Germany) Tim Scheerbarth	(Germany) Heiko Eichenberg (United Kingdom) Harley Haughton
2026	(Germany) Frank Stippler	(Germany) Patrick Assenheimer (Germany) Tobias Müller (Luxembourg) Dylan Pereira	(Turkey) Mustafa Mehmet Kaya (Germany) Mike Stursberg	(Romania) Alexandru Vasilescu	(Norway) Håkon Schjærin	(Germany) Alexander Hardt (Chile) Benjamín Hites (Germany) Benjamin Koslowski	(Germany) Alexander Fielenbach (Norway) Oskar Sandberg

=== Teams' Classifications ===
==== NLS Speed-Trophäe (Overall) ====
Year	Team	Car	Drivers
2013	(Germany) #30 MSC Adenau e.V. im ADAC	Porsche 911 GT3 R (997)	**Patrick Huisman** (9 races), Klaus Abbelen, Sabine Schmitz (8), Patrick Pilet (3), Henri Moser (2)
2014	(Germany) #30 Frikadelli Racing Team	Porsche 911 GT3 R (997)	**Klaus Abbelen**, **Patrick Huisman**, **Sabine Schmitz** (10 races), Frank Stippler (4), Patrick Pilet (2)
2015	(Germany) #36 Walkenhorst Motorsport	BMW Z4 GT3	Michela Cerruti, Felipe Fernández Laser (8 races), Jesse Krohn (5), Victor Bouveng (3), John Edwards (2), David Jahn (1)
2016	(Germany) #28 Montaplast by Land-Motorsport	Audi R8 LMS	**Connor De Phillippi** (7 races), Christopher Mies (5), Marc Basseng, Mike Rockenfeller, Timo Scheider (2)
2017	(Germany) #911 Manthey Racing	Porsche 911 GT3 R (991)	Romain Dumas (4 races), Kévin Estre, Frédéric Makowiecki (3), Richard Lietz, Patrick Pilet (2), Matteo Cairoli, Michael Christensen, Mathieu Jaminet, Lars Kern (1)
2018	(Germany) #4 Falken Motorsports	Porsche 911 GT3 R (991)	Klaus Bachler (5 races), Martin Ragginger (3), Sven Müller, Dirk Werner (2)
2019	(Germany) #6 Black Falcon	Mercedes-AMG GT3	**Patrick Assenheimer** (7 races), Manuel Metzger (3), Yelmer Buurman, Maro Engel (2), Nico Bastian, Gabriele Piana (1)
2020	(Germany) #34 Walkenhorst Motorsport	BMW M6 GT3	**David Pittard** (5 races), Mikkel Jensen, Christian Krognes (3), Jordan Pepper (1)
2021	(Germany) #5 Phoenix Racing	Audi R8 LMS Evo	**Vincent Kolb**, **Frank Stippler** (9 races), Michele Beretta, Kim-Luis Schramm, Kelvin van der Linde (1)
2022	(Germany) #16 Scherer Sport Team Phoenix	Audi R8 LMS Evo II	**Kuba Giermaziak** (8 races), Kim-Luis Schramm (5), Michele Beretta, Luca Engstler, Ricardo Feller, René Rast, Kelvin van der Linde (1)
2023	(Germany) #34 Walkenhorst Motorsport	BMW M4 GT3	**Kuba Giermaziak** (9 races), Christian Krognes (6), Jesse Krohn (2), Andy Soucek (1)
2024	(Germany) #4 Falken Motorsports	Porsche 911 GT3 R (992)	Tim Heinemann (4 races), Joel Eriksson, Nico Menzel (3), Martin Ragginger (2), Timo Glock, Sven Müller (1)
2025	(Germany) #3 Falken Motorsports	Porsche 911 GT3 R (992)	Julien Andlauer (4 races), Sven Müller, Alessio Picariello, Joel Sturm (3), Morris Schuring (2), Klaus Bachler, Dorian Boccolacci, Nico Menzel (1)
2026	(Germany) #77 Schubert Motorsport	BMW M4 GT3 Evo	Ugo de Wilde (6 races), Jens Klingmann (5), Robin Frijns, Jordan Pepper, Charles Weerts (3), Philipp Eng, Tim Tramnitz, Marco Wittmann (2)

Bold indicates the driver entered all races for the team.

=== Porsche Endurance Trophy Nürburgring ===
Year	Cup2		Cup3	
Year	Drivers	Teams	Drivers	Teams
2022	(Germany) Daniel Blickle	(Germany) #120 AVIA W&S Motorsport	(Switzerland) Mauro Calamia (Switzerland) Ivan Jacoma (Germany) Kai Riemer	(Germany) #969 Schmickler Performance
2023	(Germany) Christopher Brück (Germany) Moritz Kranz	(Germany) #121 KKrämer Racing	(Germany) Heiko Eichenberg (Germany) Fabio Grosse (Switzerland) Patrik Grütter	(Germany) #959 SRS Team Sorg Rennsport
2024	(Germany) Tobias Müller	(Germany) #148 Black Falcon Team 48 LOSCH	(France) Joshua Bednarski (Denmark) Lucas Daugaard (Germany) Moritz Oberheim	(Germany) #962 AVIA W&S Motorsport
2025	(Germany) Arne Hoffmeister (Germany) David Jahn (Germany) Tim Scheerbarth	(Belgium) #921 Mühlner Motorsport	(France) Joshua Bednarski (Germany) Lorenz Stegmann	(Germany) #962 W&S Motorsport
2026	(Germany) Nico Bastian	(Belgium) #904 Mühlner Motorsport	(Germany) Alexander Fielenbach (Norway) Oskar Sandberg	(Germany) #953 Smyrlis Racing

== Most overall race victories ==
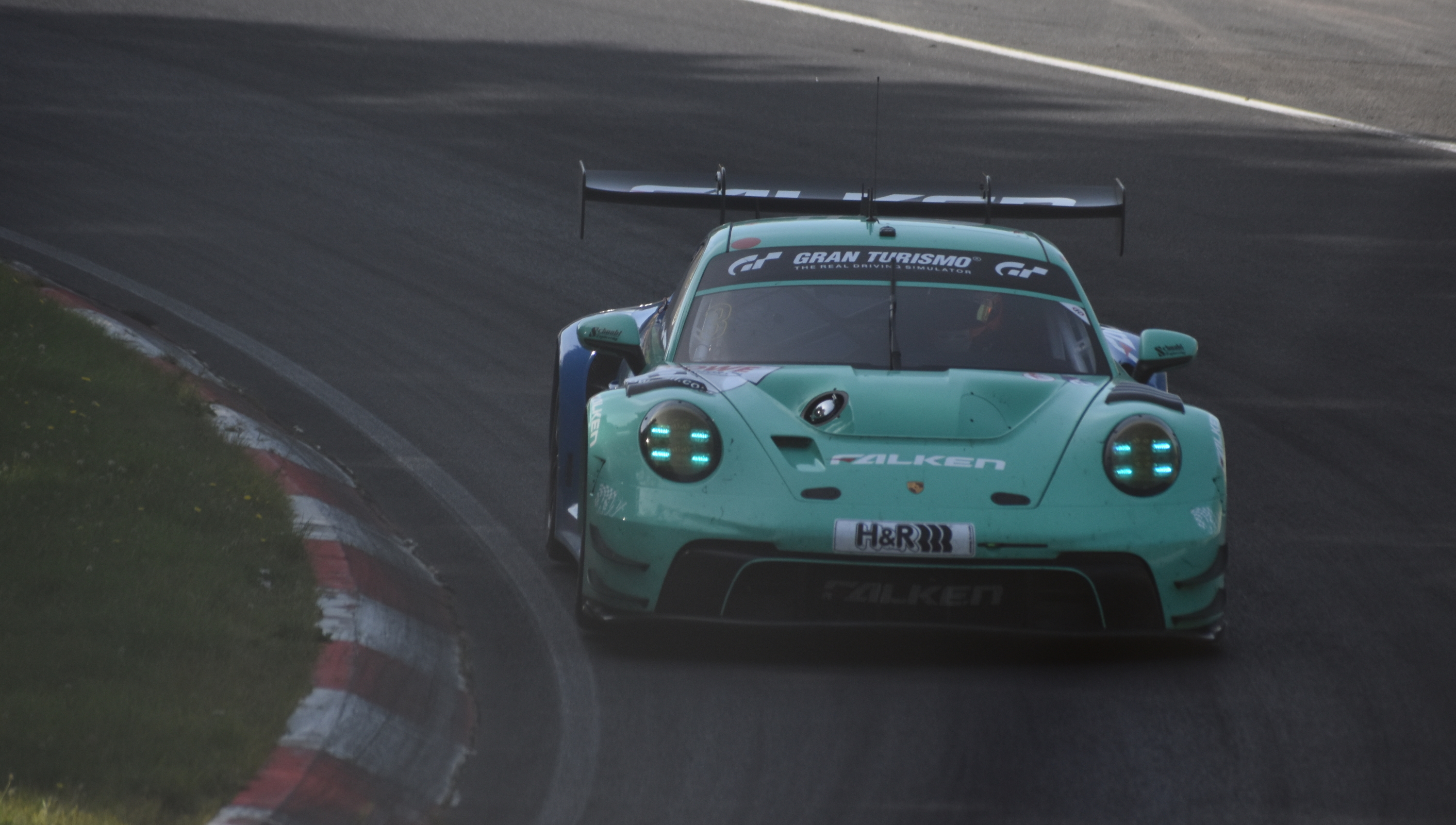
#3 Falken Motorsports, Porsche's latest overall race winners

Last updated 11 October 2026, listing drivers with 10+ victories only.

	Driver	Overall wins		Manufacturer	Overall wins
1	Olaf Manthey	30	1	Porsche	241
2	Jürgen Alzen	29	2	Mercedes-Benz	65
3	Ullrich Richter	28	3	BMW	57
4	Marc Basseng	26	4	Ford	31
4	Arno Klasen	26	5	Audi	30
6	Edgar Dören	24	6	Opel	21
7	Peter Zakowski	22	7	Chrysler	17
8	Hans-Jürgen Tiemann	21	8	Alfa Romeo	3
9	Marcel Tiemann	19	9	Ferrari	3
10	Frank Stippler	16	10	V8Star-Jaguar	3
11	Uwe Alzen	13	11	Aston Martin	1
11	Marc Lieb	13	12	Lexus	1
13	Otto Altenbach	12	13	Toyota	1
13	Jürgen Lässig	12			
13	Jürgen Oppermann	12			
16	Axel Felder	11			
17	Timo Bernhard	10			
17	Lucas Luhr	10			
17	Franz-Josef Bröhling sr.	10			

== Most group victories ==
Last updated 22 February 2026, listing top 10 drivers and manufacturers only.

	Driver	Group wins		Manufacturer	Group wins
1	Ralf Schall	67	1	Porsche	733
2	Edgar Dören	53	2	BMW	506
3	Jürgen Alzen	48	3	Ford	139
3	Olaf Manthey	48	4	Opel	120
5	Andreas Schall	45	5	Mercedes-Benz	108
6	Ulrich Richter	41	6	Audi	46
6	Johannes Scheid	41	7	Honda	43
8	Volker Strycek	40	8	Alfa Romeo	24
9	Arno Klasen	39	9	Renault	19
10	Paul Hulverscheid	35	10	Volkswagen	16
10	Sabine Schmitz	35			

== Most class victories ==
Last updated 11 October 2026, listing top 10 drivers and manufacturers only.

	Driver	Class wins		Manufacturer	Class wins
1	Volker Strycek	136	1	BMW	2349
2	Johannes Scheid	134	2	Porsche	1719
3	Daniel Zils	131	3	Opel	884
4	Ralf Schall	107	4	Volkswagen	793
5	Jürgen Nett	100	5	Audi	516
6	Andreas Schall	98	6	Ford	513
7	Peter Hass	97	7	Honda	456
8	Heinz-Otto Fritzsche	89	8	Renault	281
9	Wolfgang Weber	77	9	Mercedes-Benz	278
10	Paul Hulverscheid	76	10	Peugeot	256

== See also ==
- Manthey Racing

== Bibliography ==
- Hildebrand, Jörg; Kahnt, Erich; Scheuer, Luki (2001). 25 Jahre in der grünen Hölle: Das große Buch zum Langstreckenpokal Nürburgring. Die Fahrer, die Autos, die Fans [25 years in the Green Hell: The big book on the Nürburgring Endurance Cup. The drivers, the cars, the fans] (in German). Hackethal Verlag. ISBN 3-00-007028-1.
