= 2011 VLN Series =

Motorsport season

Seasons
- ← 2010 2012 →

The 2011 VLN Series was the 34th season of the VLN.

The drivers championship was won by Carsten Knechtges, Manuel Metzger and Tim Scheerbarth, driving a BMW Z4 for Black Falcon.

== Calendar ==
Rnd.	Race	Length	Circuit	Date
1	58. ADAC Westfalenfahrt	4 hours	(Germany) Nürburgring Nordschleife	April 2
2	36. DMV 4-Stunden-Rennen	4 hours	(Germany) Nürburgring Nordschleife	April 30
3	42. Adenauer ADAC Rundstrecken-Trophy	6 hours	(Germany) Nürburgring Nordschleife	May 14
4	53. ADAC ACAS H&R-Cup	4 hours	(Germany) Nürburgring Nordschleife	May 28
5	51. ADAC Reinoldus-Langstreckenrennen	4 hours (Note: The race was stopped after 3 hours 48 minutes due to rain and hail.)	(Germany) Nürburgring Nordschleife	June 11
6	34. RCM DMV Grenzlandrennen	4 hours (Note: The red flag was brought out twice during the race, both times due to accidents. No drivers were seriously injured. Since 162 minutes of racing had been completed by the time of the second red flag, above the minimum 160 minutes for a full points-paying race, it was not restarted.)	(Germany) Nürburgring Nordschleife	July 30
7	6h ADAC Ruhr-Pokal-Rennen	6 hours (Note: The race was stopped after 5 hours 53 minutes due to heavy rain.)	(Germany) Nürburgring Nordschleife	August 27
8	43. ADAC Barbarossapreis	4 hours	(Germany) Nürburgring Nordschleife	September 24
9	35. DMV 250-Meilen-Rennen	4 hours (Note: The race was red-flagged after 1 hour 10 minutes due to multiple separate incidents putting all track safety vehicles in use. The red flag period lasted for 1 hour 45 minutes before the race was resumed with a 2 hour 20 minute time limit, resulting in 3 hours 30 minutes total green flag time.)	(Germany) Nürburgring Nordschleife	October 15
10	36. DMV Münsterlandpokal	4 hours	(Germany) Nürburgring Nordschleife	October 29

== Race results ==
Results indicate overall winners only.

Rnd	Circuit	Pole position	Winners
1	(Germany) Nürburgring Nordschleife	No. 43 (Germany) BMW Motorsport	No. 42 (Germany) BMW Motorsport
1	(Germany) Nürburgring Nordschleife	(United Kingdom) Andy Priaulx (Germany) Dirk Müller (Germany) Dirk Werner	(Germany) Jörg Müller (Brazil) Augusto Farfus (Germany) Uwe Alzen
2	(Germany) Nürburgring Nordschleife	No. 7 (Germany) Mamerow / Rowe Racing	No. 7 (Germany) Mamerow / Rowe Racing
2	(Germany) Nürburgring Nordschleife	(Germany) Christian Mamerow (Germany) Armin Hahne	(Germany) Christian Mamerow (Germany) Armin Hahne
3	(Germany) Nürburgring Nordschleife	No. 15 (Germany) Rowe Racing	No. 123 (Germany) Team Farnbacher
3	(Germany) Nürburgring Nordschleife	(Germany) Alexander Roloff (Germany) Thomas Jäger (Germany) Roland Rehfeld	(Germany) Marco Seefried (Brazil) Jaime Melo Jr.
4	(Germany) Nürburgring Nordschleife	No. 14 (Austria) Pinta Racing	No. 36 (Germany) Team Manthey
4	(Germany) Nürburgring Nordschleife	(Germany) Michael Illbruck (Germany) Manuel Lauck	(Germany) Marco Holzer (United States) Patrick Long (Austria) Richard Lietz
5	(Germany) Nürburgring Nordschleife	No. 30 (Germany) MSC Adenau e.V. im ADAC	No. 24 (Germany) Phoenix Racing
5	(Germany) Nürburgring Nordschleife	(Germany) Klaus Abbelen (Germany) Sabine Schmitz	(Sweden) Mattias Ekström (Germany) Timo Scheider (Germany) Frank Stippler
6	(Germany) Nürburgring Nordschleife	No. 7 (Germany) Mamerow / Rowe Racing	No. 13 (Germany) Rowe Racing
6	(Germany) Nürburgring Nordschleife	(Germany) Christian Mamerow (Germany) Armin Hahne	(Germany) Michael Zehe (Germany) Alexander Roloff (Germany) Roland Rehfeld
7	(Germany) Nürburgring Nordschleife	No. 225 (Germany) Raeder Motorsport	No. 225 (Germany) Raeder Motorsport
7	(Germany) Nürburgring Nordschleife	(Germany) Frank Biela (Germany) Christian Hohenadel (Germany) Michael Ammermüller	(Germany) Frank Biela (Germany) Christian Hohenadel (Germany) Michael Ammermüller
8	(Germany) Nürburgring Nordschleife	No. 27 (Germany) Phoenix Racing	No. 11 (Germany) Manthey Racing
8	(Germany) Nürburgring Nordschleife	(Germany) Christopher Haase (Germany) Frank Stippler	(Germany) Lucas Luhr (Germany) Arno Klasen
9	(Germany) Nürburgring Nordschleife	No. 7 (Germany) Mamerow / Rowe Racing	No. 11 (Germany) Manthey Racing
9	(Germany) Nürburgring Nordschleife	(Germany) Christian Mamerow (Germany) Armin Hahne	(Germany) Lucas Luhr (Germany) Arno Klasen
10	(Germany) Nürburgring Nordschleife	No. 11 (Germany) Manthey Racing	No. 28 (Germany) Phoenix Racing
10	(Germany) Nürburgring Nordschleife	(Germany) Lucas Luhr (Switzerland) Marc Lieb	(Germany) Marc Basseng (Germany) Christopher Mies (Germany) Michael Ammermüller

== See also ==
- 2011 24 Hours of Nürburgring

== Bibliography ==
- Jörg Hildebrand & Hasso Jacoby. Grüne Hölle 2011: Die Langstreckenrennen auf dem Nürburgring (in German). Hackethal Verlag. ISBN 978-3-936285-37-6.
