= 2012 VLN Series =

Motorsport season

Seasons
- ← 2011 2013 →

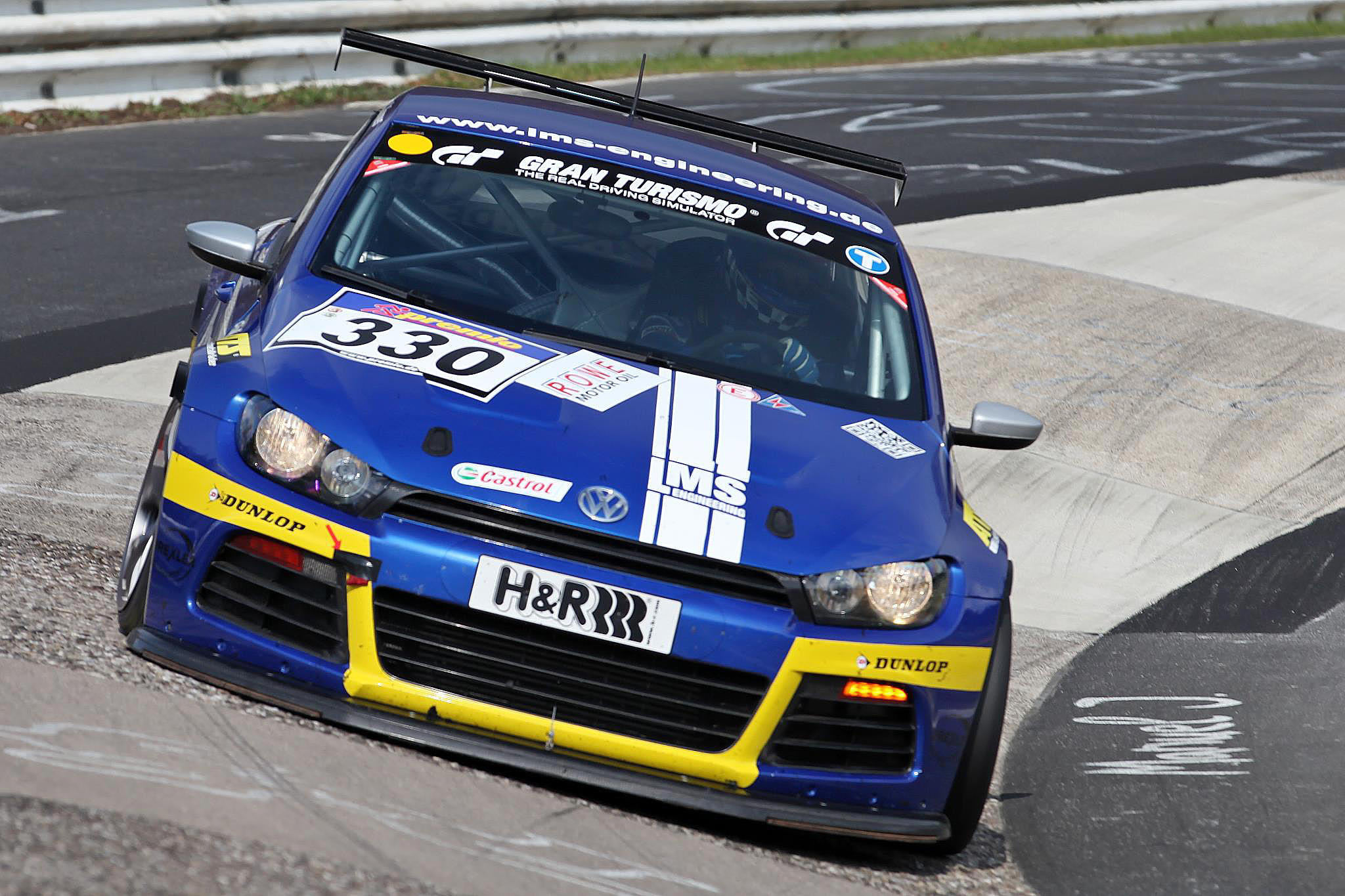
Volkswagen Scirocco GT24 of 2012 drivers champions Ulrich Andree, Dominik Brinkmann and Christian Krognes

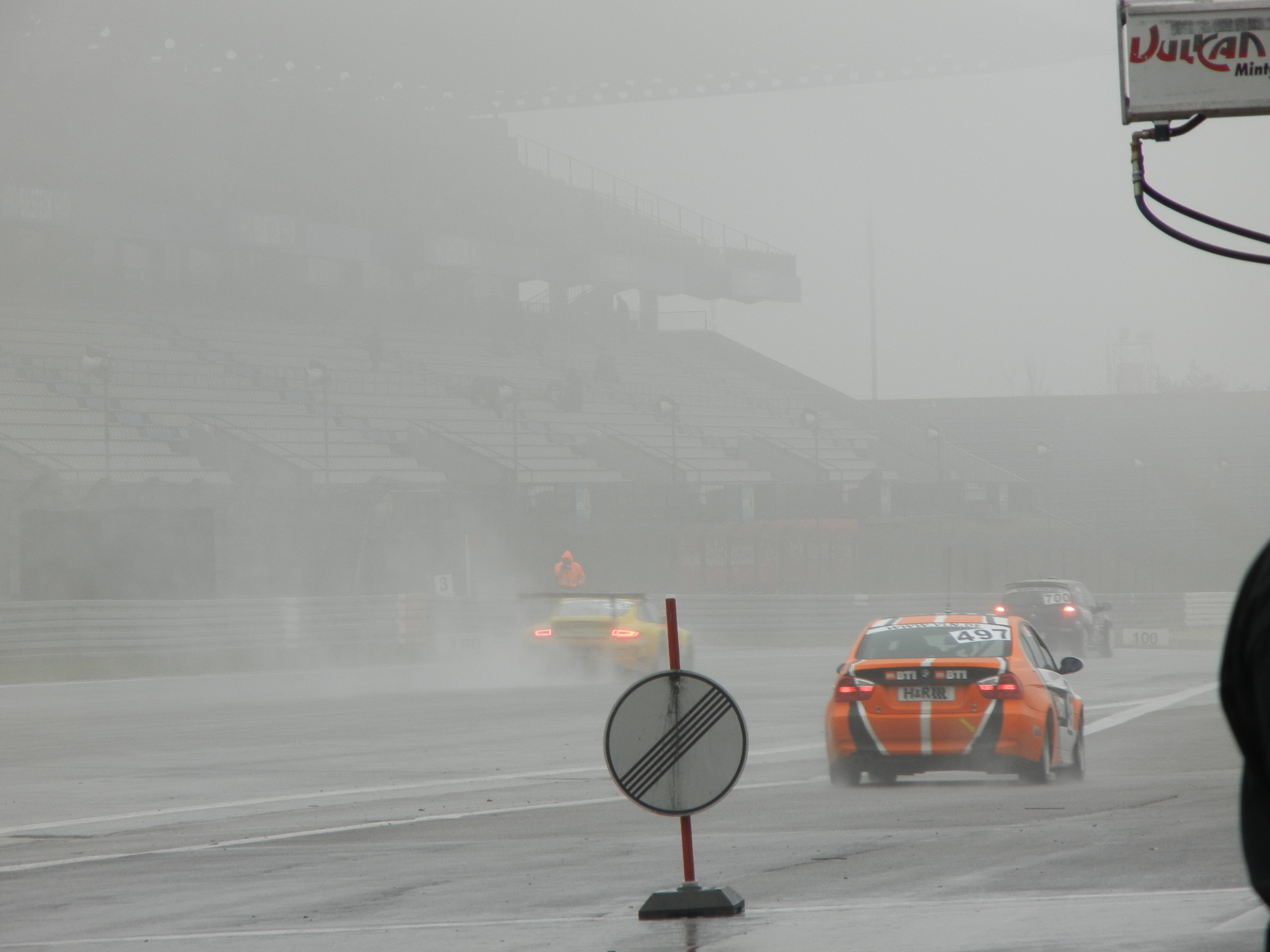
Heavy rain and fog caused a race stoppage in race 1.

The 2012 VLN Series was the 35th season of the VLN.

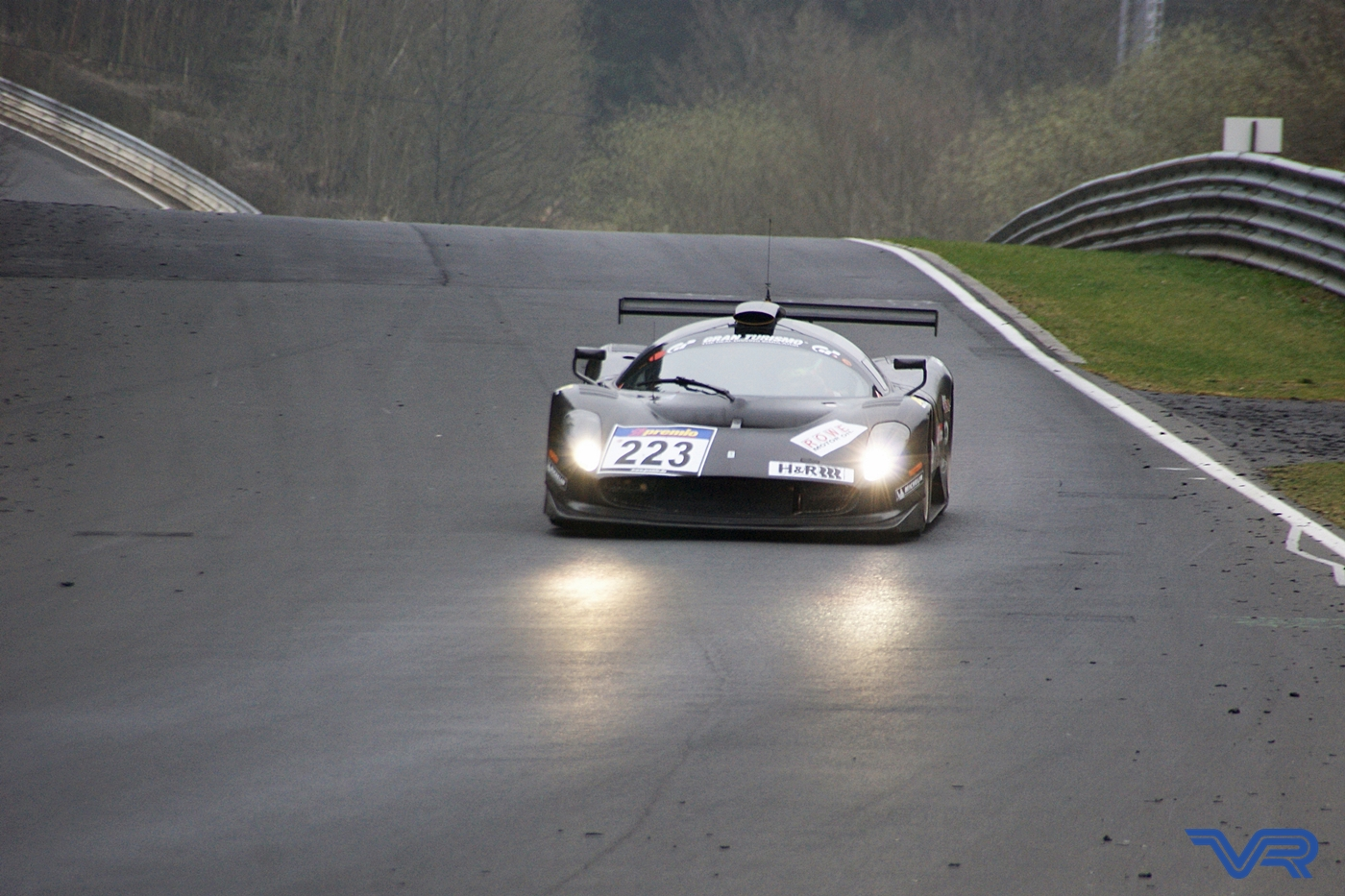
#223 Glickenhaus P4/5 Competizione

The drivers championship was won by Ulrich Andree, Dominik Brinkmann and Christian Krognes, driving a Volkswagen Scirocco GT24 for LMS Engineering.

== Calendar ==
Rnd.	Race	Length	Circuit	Date
1	59. ADAC Westfalenfahrt	4 hours (Note: The race was red-flagged after 2 hours 43 minutes due to heavy fog. The weather showed no signs of improving, so the race was not restarted.)	(Germany) Nürburgring Nordschleife	March 31
2	37. DMV 4-Stunden-Rennen	4 hours (Note: The race was stopped after 3 hours 47 minutes due to the onset of hail.)	(Germany) Nürburgring Nordschleife	April 14
3	54. ADAC ACAS H&R-Cup	4 hours (Note: The race was stopped after 3 hours 55 minutes when the No. 19 BMW Z4 of Dirk Müller collided with the No. 198 Ginetta G50 of Clive Richards. Neither driver was injured.)	(Germany) Nürburgring Nordschleife	April 28
4	43. Adenauer ADAC Rundstrecken-Trophy	4 hours	(Germany) Nürburgring Nordschleife	June 23
5	52. ADAC Reinoldus-Langstreckenrennen	4 hours	(Germany) Nürburgring Nordschleife	July 7
6	35. RCM DMV Grenzlandrennen	4 hours	(Germany) Nürburgring Nordschleife	July 21
7	6h ADAC Ruhr-Pokal-Rennen	6 hours	(Germany) Nürburgring Nordschleife	August 4
8	44. ADAC Barbarossapreis	4 hours	(Germany) Nürburgring Nordschleife	August 25
9	ROWE 250-Meilen-Rennen	4 hours	(Germany) Nürburgring Nordschleife	September 29
10	37. DMV Münsterlandpokal	4 hours	(Germany) Nürburgring Nordschleife	October 27

== Race results ==
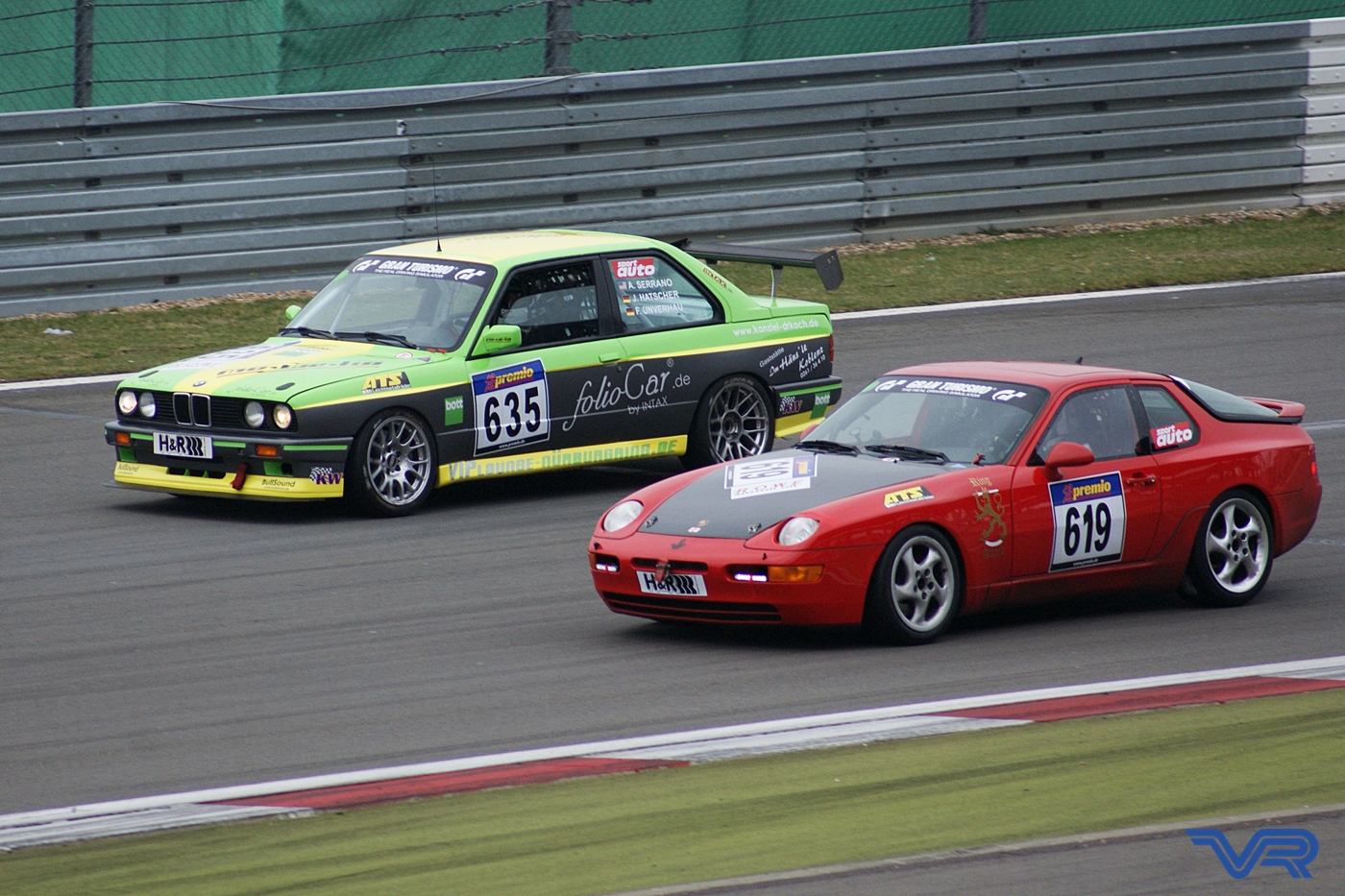
Porsche 968 CS and BMW M3

Results indicate overall winners only.

Rnd	Circuit	Pole position	Winners
1	(Germany) Nürburgring Nordschleife	No. 27 (Germany) Falken Motorsports	No. 19 (Germany) Team Schubert
1	(Germany) Nürburgring Nordschleife	(United Kingdom) Peter Dumbreck (Germany) Wolf Henzler	(Germany) Dirk Adorf (Germany) Dirk Müller (Germany) Jörg Müller
2	(Germany) Nürburgring Nordschleife	No. 18 (Germany) Team Vita4One	No. 10 (Germany) Manthey Racing
2	(Germany) Nürburgring Nordschleife	(Germany) Marco Wittmann (Germany) Jens Klingmann (Netherlands) Ricardo van der Ende (Austria) Mathias Lauda	(Germany) Jochen Krumbach (Germany) Marc Lieb
3	(Germany) Nürburgring Nordschleife	No. 19 (Germany) Team Schubert	No. 10 (Germany) Manthey Racing
3	(Germany) Nürburgring Nordschleife	(Germany) Jörg Müller (Germany) Dirk Müller (Germany) Uwe Alzen	(Germany) Jochen Krumbach (Germany) Marc Lieb
4	(Germany) Nürburgring Nordschleife	No. 15 (Germany) Team Phoenix	No. 15 (Germany) Team Phoenix
4	(Germany) Nürburgring Nordschleife	(Germany) Frank Stippler (Germany) Marc Basseng	(Germany) Frank Stippler (Germany) Marc Basseng
5	(Germany) Nürburgring Nordschleife	No. 10 (Germany) Manthey Racing	No. 7 (Germany) Rowe Racing
5	(Germany) Nürburgring Nordschleife	(Germany) Jochen Krumbach (Germany) Marc Lieb	(Germany) Alexander Roloff (Germany) Jan Seyffarth
6	(Germany) Nürburgring Nordschleife	No. 7 (Germany) Rowe Racing	No. 15 (Germany) Team Phoenix
6	(Germany) Nürburgring Nordschleife	(Germany) Thomas Jäger (Germany) Alexander Roloff (Germany) Jan Seyffarth	(Germany) Frank Stippler (Germany) Marc Basseng
7	(Germany) Nürburgring Nordschleife	No. 7 (Germany) Rowe Racing	No. 7 (Germany) Rowe Racing
7	(Germany) Nürburgring Nordschleife	(Germany) Thomas Jäger (Germany) Alexander Roloff (Germany) Jan Seyffarth	(Germany) Thomas Jäger (Germany) Alexander Roloff (Germany) Jan Seyffarth
8	(Germany) Nürburgring Nordschleife	No. 10 (Germany) Manthey Racing	No. 44 (Germany) Raeder Motorsport
8	(Germany) Nürburgring Nordschleife	(Germany) Jochen Krumbach (Germany) Timo Bernhard (France) Patrick Pilet	(Germany) Frank Biela (Germany) Christian Hohenadel (Germany) Thomas Mutsch
9	(Germany) Nürburgring Nordschleife	No. 45 (Germany) Timbuli Racing	No. 2 (Germany) Black Falcon
9	(Germany) Nürburgring Nordschleife	(Austria) Norbert Siedler (Germany) Marco Seefried (Germany) Marc Hennerici	(Germany) Bernd Schneider (Netherlands) Jeroen Bleekemolen
10	(Germany) Nürburgring Nordschleife	Event cancelled due to ice on the track.	

== See also ==
- 2012 24 Hours of Nürburgring

== Bibliography ==
- Jörg Hildebrand & Hasso Jacoby. Grüne Hölle 2012: Die Langstreckenrennen auf dem Nürburgring (in German). Hackethal Verlag. ISBN 978-3-936285-38-3.
