= 2010 VLN Series =

Motorsport season

Seasons
- ← 2009 2011 →

The 2010 VLN Series was the 33rd season of the VLN.

The drivers championship was won by Mario Merten and Wolf Silvester, driving a BMW Z4 for Bonk Motorsport.

The third race was overshadowed by the fatal accident of Leo Löwenstein. With around 40 minutes to go, Löwenstein, driving the No. 83 Aston Martin Vantage, came upon two backmarkers, the No. 137 Lexus IS F and the No. 511 BMW 130i, who were themselves fighting for position. Löwenstein attempted to pass between the two cars near Bergwerk, but connected with one of them, took off and rolled several times. The car hit the barriers with an impact that ruptured its fuel cell, landing upside down and ablaze. Marshals arrived on the scene within seconds but neither they nor Löwenstein himself were able to extricate him from the wreckage. He succumbed to smoke inhalation.

== Calendar ==
Rnd.	Race	Length	Circuit	Date
1	57. ADAC Westfalenfahrt	4 hours	(Germany) Nürburgring Nordschleife	March 27
2	35. DMV 4-Stunden-Rennen	4 hours	(Germany) Nürburgring Nordschleife	April 10
3	52. ADAC ACAS H&R-Cup	4 hours (Note: The race was stopped after around 3 hours 30 minutes due to the fatal accident of Leo Löwenstein.)	(Germany) Nürburgring Nordschleife	April 24
4	41. Adenauer ADAC Rundstrecken-Trophy	4 hours	(Germany) Nürburgring Nordschleife	June 12
5	50. ADAC Reinoldus-Langstreckenrennen	4 hours (Note: The race was stopped after 3 hours 51 minutes, when Hans-Joachim Stuck encountered rain near Aremberg and crashed. He escaped with a concussion. The race was not restarted.)	(Germany) Nürburgring Nordschleife	July 3
6	33. RCM DMV Grenzlandrennen	4 hours	(Germany) Nürburgring Nordschleife	July 17
7	6h ADAC Ruhr-Pokal-Rennen	6 hours	(Germany) Nürburgring Nordschleife	July 31
8	42. ADAC Barbarossapreis	4 hours (Note: The race was stopped after 3 hours 8 minutes for safety reasons, due to guard rail damage from a number of separate incidents near Hatzenbach, Aremberg and Fuchsröhre. No drivers were injured.)	(Germany) Nürburgring Nordschleife	September 25
9	34. DMV 250-Meilen-Rennen	4 hours (Note: The race was stopped after 3 hours 48 minutes due to sleet.)	(Germany) Nürburgring Nordschleife	October 16
10	35. DMV Münsterlandpokal	4 hours	(Germany) Nürburgring Nordschleife	October 30

== Race results ==
Results indicate overall winners only.

Rnd	Circuit	Pole position	Winners
1	(Germany) Nürburgring Nordschleife	No. 1 (Germany) Black Falcon	No. 114 (Germany) Manthey Racing
1	(Germany) Nürburgring Nordschleife	(Germany) Christer Jöns (Republic of Ireland) Seán Paul Breslin (Germany) Johannes Stuck	(Germany) Marcel Tiemann (Germany) Marc Lieb (Germany) Timo Bernhard
2	(Germany) Nürburgring Nordschleife	No. 99 (Germany) Phoenix Racing	No. 114 (Germany) Manthey Racing
2	(Germany) Nürburgring Nordschleife	(Germany) Frank Stippler (Switzerland) Marcel Fässler (Germany) Mike Rockenfeller	(Germany) Marcel Tiemann (Germany) Timo Bernhard (France) Romain Dumas
3	(Germany) Nürburgring Nordschleife	No. 99 (Germany) Phoenix Racing	No. 93 (Germany) Mamerow Racing
3	(Germany) Nürburgring Nordschleife	(Germany) Frank Stippler (Germany) Hans-Joachim Stuck (Germany) Marc Hennerici	(Germany) Christian Mamerow (Germany) Wolf Henzler
4	(Germany) Nürburgring Nordschleife	No. 93 (Germany) Mamerow Racing	No. 93 (Germany) Mamerow Racing
4	(Germany) Nürburgring Nordschleife	(Germany) Christian Mamerow (Germany) Marc Basseng	(Germany) Christian Mamerow (Germany) Marc Basseng
5	(Germany) Nürburgring Nordschleife	No. 114 (Germany) Manthey Racing	No. 114 (Germany) Manthey Racing
5	(Germany) Nürburgring Nordschleife	(Germany) Marc Lieb (Germany) Arno Klasen	(Germany) Marc Lieb (Germany) Arno Klasen
6	(Germany) Nürburgring Nordschleife	No. 114 (Germany) Manthey Racing	No. 88 (Germany) Manthey Racing
6	(Germany) Nürburgring Nordschleife	(France) Romain Dumas (Germany) Arno Klasen	(Germany) Lance David Arnold (Germany) Christian Menzel
7	(Germany) Nürburgring Nordschleife	No. 88 (Germany) Manthey Racing	No. 88 (Germany) Manthey Racing
7	(Germany) Nürburgring Nordschleife	(Germany) Lance David Arnold (Germany) Christian Menzel	(Germany) Lance David Arnold (Germany) Christian Menzel
8	(Germany) Nürburgring Nordschleife	No. 86	No. 88 (Germany) Manthey Racing
8	(Germany) Nürburgring Nordschleife	(Germany) Christian Hohenadel (Germany) Lance David Arnold	(Germany) Lucas Luhr (United Kingdom) Richard Westbrook
9	(Germany) Nürburgring Nordschleife	No. 739 (Germany) Mamerow Racing	No. 738 (Germany) Black Falcon
9	(Germany) Nürburgring Nordschleife	(Germany) Bernd Schneider (Germany) Christian Mamerow	(Germany) Thomas Jäger (Germany) Christopher Haase
10	(Germany) Nürburgring Nordschleife	No. 114 (Germany) Manthey Racing	No. 114 (Germany) Manthey Racing
10	(Germany) Nürburgring Nordschleife	(Germany) Marc Lieb (Germany) Arno Klasen (Germany) Lucas Luhr	(Germany) Marc Lieb (Germany) Arno Klasen (Germany) Lucas Luhr

== See also ==
- 2010 24 Hours of Nürburgring

== Bibliography ==
- Jörg Hildebrand, Hasso Jacoby & Wolfgang Sievernich. Grüne Hölle 2010: Die Langstreckenrennen auf dem Nürburgring (in German). Hackethal Verlag. ISBN 978-3936285369.
