= Manuel Metzger =

German racing driver (born 1986)

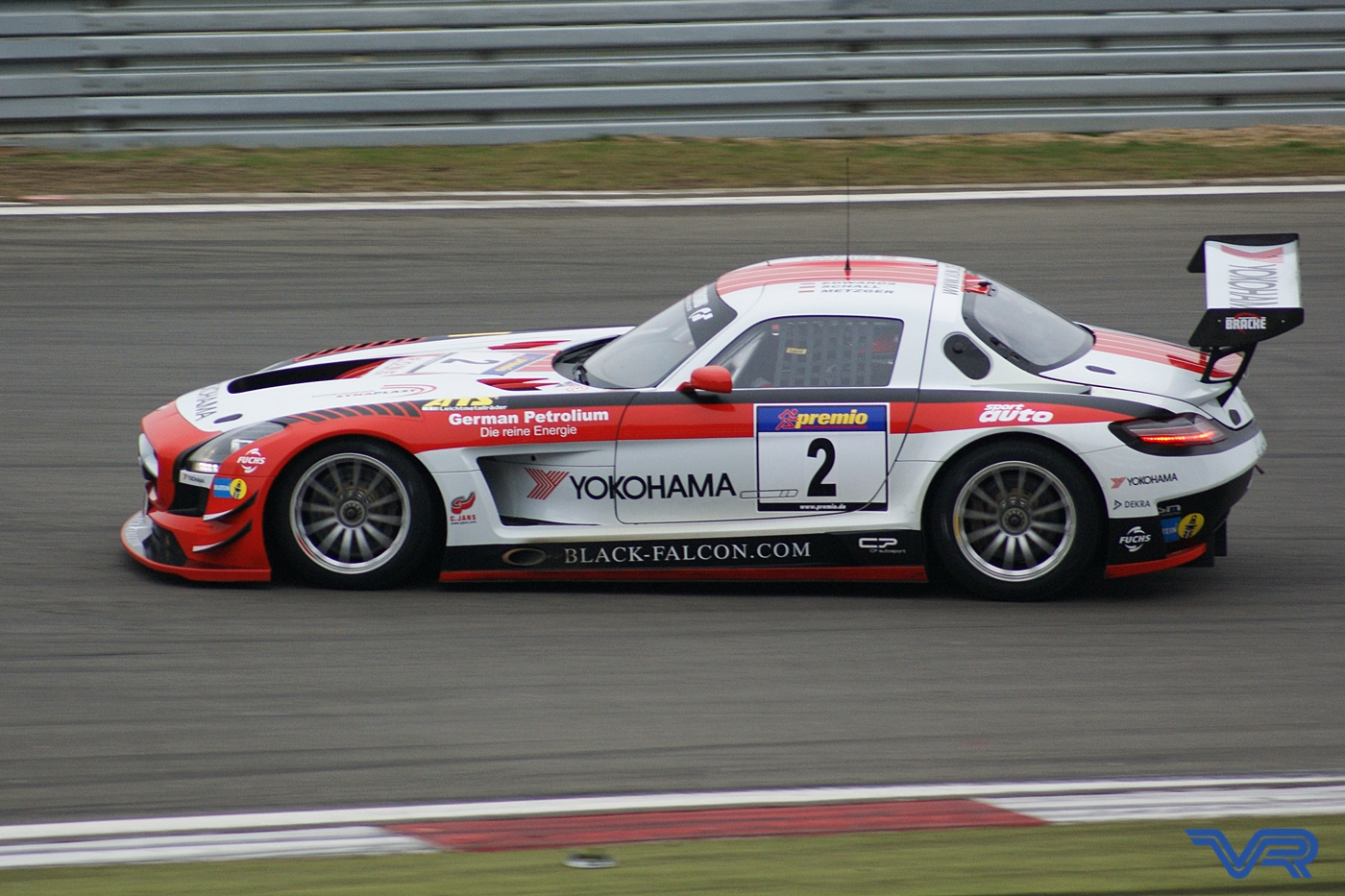
- Metzger in 2012
- Born: Manuel Metzger; 9 February 1986 (age 40); Bad Säckingen, Germany
- Nationality: (Germany) German
- Categorisation: FIA Silver

Championship titles
- 2026 2011: Nürburgring Langstrecken-Serie – AT 2 VLN Series

Manuel "Manny" Metzger (born 9 February 1986) is a German racing driver who last competed for Black Falcon Team Fanatec in the AT2 class of the Nürburgring Langstrecken-Serie alongside the YouTube trio Jimmy Broadbent, Steve Alvarez Brown and Misha Charoudin.

A Nürburgring Nordschleife specialist, he won the 2016 24 Hours of Nürburgring overall for Mercedes-AMG Team Black Falcon. He is also the 2011 VLN Series champion.

== Career ==
Metzger began indoor karting at the age of ten, but had to wait until 2008 to make his car racing debut, doing so for Steibel Motorsport in Renault Clio Cup Belgium, in which he raced in for two years. Metzger then went back to indoor karting for 2010, winning the 24 Hours of Cologne for R&S Mobile Köln, before returning to car racing the following year, winning the 24 Hours of Nürburgring in the V5 class and the VLN Series overall title for Black Falcon.

Remaining with Black Falcon for 2012, Metzger finished second in the SP3 class in the Dubai 24 Hour, and also made his Blancpain Endurance Series debut at Le Castellet. Racing at Le Castellet and the 24 Hours of Spa in the Pro-Am class, Metzger scored a best result of 10th overall on debut and fifth in class, helping him to end the year 30th in the Pro-Am standings.

Following a V6 class podium in the 2014 24 Hours of Nürburgring, Metzger returned to Black Falcon to race in the following year's Dubai 24 Hour as part of the team's four-car line-up. Racing in the 997 class, Metzger finished third in class at his second appearance at the event. For the rest of the year, Metzger returned to Black Falcon to race in the VLN Series, in which he took four class wins in SP7, with one of those being an overall win at the NLS10, and also won the NLS9 overall while racing in the SP9 class. Also that year, Metzger raced in the 24 Hours of Nürburgring for the same team, winning in the SP7 class at his fourth appearance in the race.

Staying with Black Falcon for 2016, Metzger opened up the year by finishing third in the 991 class at the Dubai 24 Hour, before taking the overall win at the 24 Hours of Nürburgring alongside Maro Engel, Adam Christodoulou and Bernd Schneider. The following year, Metzger remained with Black Falcon as he once again raced in the Dubai 24 Hour and Nürburgring-based events with them, whilst also making a brief return in the Blancpain GT Series Endurance Cup.

Continuing with Black Falcon through 2018, Metzger finished second overall in the 24 Hours of Nürburgring, before scoring two overall wins in the VLN Series and making a cameo appearance at the 24 Hours of Spa. At the end of 2018, Metzger made a one-off appearance in the Blancpain GT Series Asia season-finale at Ningbo for Indigo Racing. In his first weekend in Asia, Metzger finished third overall in both races and ended the year 14th in the Silver Cup standings.

Metzger then continued with Black Falcon in 2019, taking two overall VLN Series wins and an SP7 class win as he ended the year third in the SP9 standings. During 2019, Metzger also returned to the Blancpain GT World Challenge Asia, in which he raced for Solite Indigo Racing alongside Roelof Bruins. Racing in all but four rounds, Metzger took his maiden series win at Buriram, before taking further wins at Fuji and Yeongam to end the year fifth as Bruins won the title. Across the following three years, Metzger mainly raced with Haupt Racing Team as they mainly competed in Nürburgring-based races and partook in the Dubai 24 Hours twice, most notably winning it overall in 2020 for Black Falcon.

Following a one-year hiatus from racing after departing the Mercedes stable, Metzger returned to the NLS in 2024, driving for Black Falcon alongside Jimmy Broadbent, Steve Alvarez Brown and Misha Charoudin in the SP8T class. After taking three class wins and finishing second in the SP8T class at the 24 Hours of Nürburgring in his first season driving a BMW M4 GT4 Evo, Metzger remained with them for 2025. In his second season in the SP8T class, Metzger won the NLS1 in class and was runner-up in both the season's standings and the 24 Hours of Nürburgring.

In 2026, Metzger continued with Black Falcon as he and the trio stepped up to the AT 2 class, winning six out of the seven races he started to clinch his first NLS class title.

== Karting record ==
=== Karting career summary ===
Season	Series	Team	Position
2010	24 Hours of Leipzig	DAX Bierbörse/Media Bomb/Scharmüller	3rd
2010	24 Hours of Cologne	R&S Mobile	1st
2011	24 Hours of Cologne	Mr-T-Shirt.de	2nd
2012	24 Hours of Cologne	Wirtz & Hintzen Lackierer	2nd

== Racing record ==
=== Racing career summary ===
Season	Series	Team	Races	Wins	Poles	F/Laps	Podiums	Points	Position
2009	Renault Clio Cup Belgium	Steibel Motorsport	10	0	0	0	0	40	9th
2011	VLN Endurance								**1st**
2011	24 Hours of Nürburgring – V5	Black Falcon Team TMD Friction	1	1	0	0	1	—N/a	**1st**
2012	Dubai 24 Hour – SP3	Black Falcon	1	0	0	0	1	—N/a	**2nd**
2012	Blancpain Endurance Series – Pro-Am	Black Falcon	2	0	0	0	0	10	30th
2012	24 Hours of Nürburgring – SP9	Black Falcon	1	0	0	0	0	—N/a	DNF
2013	24 Hours of Nürburgring – SP7		0	0	0	0	0	—N/a	DNS
2014	24 Hours of Nürburgring – V6	Black Falcon	1	0	0	0	1	—N/a	**2nd**
2015	Dubai 24 Hour – 997	Black Falcon	1	0	0	0	1	—N/a	**3rd**
2015	24H Series – 997	Black Falcon	1	0	0	0	0	0	NC
2015	VLN Series – SP9 Pro	Black Falcon	2	1	1	0	0	0	NC
2015	VLN Series – SP7	Black Falcon	5	4	0	2	5	0	NC
2015	24 Hours of Nürburgring – SP7	Black Falcon	1	1	0	0	1	—N/a	**1st**
2016	Dubai 24 Hour – 991	Black Falcon Team TMD Friction	1	0	0	0	1	—N/a	**3rd**
2016	24H Series – 991	Black Falcon Team TMD Friction	1	0	0	0	1	0	NC
2016	VLN Series – SP9 Pro	AMG-Team Black Falcon	3	0	1	0	2	0	NC
2016	24 Hours of Nürburgring – SP9	AMG-Team Black Falcon	1	1	0	0	1	—N/a	**1st**
2017	Dubai 24 Hour – A6-Pro	Black Falcon	1	0	0	0	0	—N/a	DNF
2017	24H Series – A6-Pro	Black Falcon	1	0	0	0	0	0	NC
2017	24H Series – SP2	Black Falcon	1	0	0	0	0	0	NC
2017	VLN Series – SP9	Black Falcon	4	0	0	0	0	0	NC
2017	VLN Series – SPX	Black Falcon	1	0	0	0	0	0	NC
2017	24 Hours of Nürburgring – SP9	Black Falcon	1	0	0	0	0	—N/a	5th
2017	Blancpain GT Series Endurance Cup – Pro-Am	Black Falcon	2	0	0	0	0	6	41st
2018	Dubai 24 Hour – A6-Pro	Black Falcon	1	0	0	0	0	—N/a	DNF
2018	24H GT Series – A6-Pro	Black Falcon	1	0	0	0	0	0	NC
2018	VLN Series – SP9 Pro	Black Falcon	3	2	0	0	3	18.67	**3rd**
2018	24 Hours of Nürburgring – SP9	Black Falcon	1	0	0	0	1	—N/a	**2nd**
2018	Blancpain GT Series Endurance Cup – Silver	Black Falcon	1	0	0	0	1	28	13th
2018	Blancpain GT Series Asia – GT3 Silver	Indigo Racing	2	0	0	0	2	33	14th
2019	Dubai 24 Hour – A6-Pro	Abu Dhabi Racing Black Falcon	1	0	0	0	0	—N/a	10th
2019	24H GT Series – A6-Pro	Abu Dhabi Racing Black Falcon	1	0	0	0	0	0	NC
2019	VLN Series – SP9 Pro	Black Falcon	4	2	0	0	4	34.47	**3rd**
2019	VLN Series – SP7	Black Falcon	4	1	0	0	3	23.67	11th
2019	24 Hours of Nürburgring – SP9	Black Falcon	1	0	0	0	0	—N/a	DNF
2019	Blancpain GT World Challenge Asia – GT3 Silver	Solite Indigo Racing	8	3	2	0	5	148	5th
2020	Dubai 24 Hour – GT3 Pro	Black Falcon	1	1	0	0	1	—N/a	**1st**
2020	24H GT Series – GT3-Pro	Black Falcon	1	1	1	0	1	0	NC
2020	Nürburgring Langstrecken-Serie – SP9 Pro	Mercedes-AMG Team HRT	3	2	1	0	2	19.49	19th
2020	24 Hours of Nürburgring – SP9	Mercedes-AMG Team HRT	1	0	0	0	0	—N/a	DNF
2021	Nürburgring Langstrecken-Serie – SP9 Pro	Mercedes-AMG Team HRT	3	0	0	0	0	0	NC
2021	Nürburgring Langstrecken-Serie – SP9 Pro	Mercedes-AMG Team HRT Bilstein	1	0	0	0	0	0	NC
2021	24 Hours of Nürburgring – SP9 Pro	Mercedes-AMG Team HRT Bilstein	1	0	0	0	0	—N/a	DNF
2021	Nürburgring Langstrecken-Serie – SPPRO	Black Falcon Team IDENTICA	1	1	1	1	1	0	NC
2022	Dubai 24 Hour – GT3 Pro	Mercedes-AMG Team HRT Bilstein	1	0	0	0	0	—N/a	4th
2022	24H GT Series – GT3-Pro	Mercedes-AMG Team HRT Bilstein	1	0	0	0	0	0	NC
2022	Nürburgring Langstrecken-Serie – SP9	Mercedes-AMG Team Bilstein	2	0	0	0	0	0	NC
2024	Nürburgring Langstrecken-Serie – SP8T	Team Bilstein by Black Falcon	7	3	0	0	4	0	NC
2024	24 Hours of Nürburgring – SP8T	Team Bilstein by Black Falcon	1	0	0	0	1	—N/a	**2nd**
2025	Nürburgring Langstrecken-Serie – SP8T	Team Bilstein by Black Falcon	7	1	0	0	7	84	**3rd**
2025	24 Hours of Nürburgring – SP8T	Team Bilstein by Black Falcon	1	0	0	0	1	—N/a	**2nd**
2025-26	24H Series Middle East - GT3 Am	HOFOR Racing	1	0	0	0	1	52	NC
2026	Nürburgring Langstrecken-Serie – AT 2	Black Falcon Team Fanatec	7	6	0	0	6	15	**1st**
2026	24 Hours of Nürburgring – AT 2	Black Falcon Team Fanatec	1	0	0	0	0	—N/a	DNF
2026	Porsche Endurance Trophy Nürburgring Cup – Cup2	AV Racing by Black Falcon							
2026	Nürburgring Langstrecken-Serie – SP10 Am	AV Racing by Black Falcon	2	1	0	0	2	26	NC

=== Complete GT World Challenge results ===
==== GT World Challenge Europe Endurance Cup ====
(Races in bold indicate pole position) (Races in italics indicate fastest lap)

Year	Team	Car	Class	1	2	3	4	5	6	7	8	Pos.	Points
2012	Black Falcon	Mercedes-Benz SLS AMG GT3	Pro-Am	MNZ	SIL	LEC; 10	SPA; 6H ?	SPA; 12H ?	SPA; 24H; 19	NÜR	NAV	30th	10
2017	Black Falcon	Mercedes-AMG GT3	Pro-Am	MON; 19	SIL; Ret	LEC	SPA; 6H	SPA; 12H	SPA; 24H	CAT		41st	6
2018	Black Falcon	Mercedes-AMG GT3	Silver	MON	SIL	LEC	SPA; 6H; 33	SPA; 12H; 29	SPA; 24H; 23	CAT		13th	28

^{†} Did not finish, but was classified as he had completed more than 90% of the race distance.

=== Complete GT World Challenge Asia results ===
(key) (Races in bold indicate pole position) (Races in italics indicate fastest lap)

Year	Team	Car	Class	1	2	3	4	5	6	7	8	9	10	11	12	DC	Points
2018	Indigo Racing	Mercedes-AMG GT3	Silver	SEP; 1	SEP; 2	CHA; 1	CHA; 2	SUZ; 1	SUZ; 2	FSW; 1	FSW; 2	SIC; 1	SIC; 2	NIC; 1; 3	NIC; 2; 3	14th	33
2019	Solite Indigo Racing	Mercedes-AMG GT3	Silver	SEP; 1	SEP; 2	CHA; 1; 1	CHA; 2; 5	SUZ; 1	SUZ; 2	FSW; 1; 1	FSW; 2; 8	**KOR**; **1**; 1	**KOR**; **2**; 4	SIC; 1; 4	SIC; 2; 5	5th	148

^{†} As Metzger was a guest driver, he was ineligible for championship points.
