= 2018 VLN Series =

Motorsport season

The 2018 VLN Series was the 41st season of the VLN.

The drivers championship was won by Philipp Leisen, Christopher Rink and Danny Brink, driving a BMW 325i for Adrenalin Motorsport.

== Calendar ==
Rnd.	Race	Length	Circuit	Date
1	64. ADAC Westfalenfahrt	4 hours	(Germany) Nürburgring Nordschleife	March 24
2	43. DMV 4-Stunden-Rennen	4 hours	(Germany) Nürburgring Nordschleife	April 7
3	60. ADAC ACAS H&R-Cup	4 hours	(Germany) Nürburgring Nordschleife	June 23
4	49. Adenauer ADAC Rundstrecken-Trophy	4 hours	(Germany) Nürburgring Nordschleife	July 7
5	ROWE 6 Stunden ADAC Ruhr-Pokal-Rennen	6 hours	(Germany) Nürburgring Nordschleife	August 18
6	41. RCM DMV Grenzlandrennen	4 hours	(Germany) Nürburgring Nordschleife	September 1
7	58. ADAC Reinoldus-Langstreckenrennen	4 hours	(Germany) Nürburgring Nordschleife	September 22
8	50. ADAC Barbarossapreis	4 hours	(Germany) Nürburgring Nordschleife	October 6
9	43. DMV Münsterlandpokal	4 hours	(Germany) Nürburgring Nordschleife	October 20

== Race results ==
Results indicate overall winners only.

Rnd	Circuit	Pole position	Winners
1	(Germany) Nürburgring Nordschleife	No. 911 (Germany) Manthey Racing	No. 911 (Germany) Manthey Racing
1	(Germany) Nürburgring Nordschleife	(France) Kévin Estre (New Zealand) Earl Bamber (Belgium) Laurens Vanthoor	(France) Kévin Estre (New Zealand) Earl Bamber (Belgium) Laurens Vanthoor
2	(Germany) Nürburgring Nordschleife	No. 911 (Germany) Manthey Racing	No. 99 (Germany) Rowe Racing
2	(Germany) Nürburgring Nordschleife	(France) Romain Dumas (Belgium) Laurens Vanthoor (New Zealand) Earl Bamber	(Finland) Jesse Krohn (United States) Connor De Phillippi
3	(Germany) Nürburgring Nordschleife	No. 11 (Germany) Team Monschau	No. 31 (Germany) Frikadelli Racing Team
3	(Germany) Nürburgring Nordschleife	(Germany) Leonard Weiss (Germany) Christian Menzel	(Germany) Lance David Arnold (Germany) Felipe Fernández Laser
4	(Germany) Nürburgring Nordschleife	No. 31 (Germany) Frikadelli Racing Team	No. 31 (Germany) Frikadelli Racing Team
4	(Germany) Nürburgring Nordschleife	(Austria) Norbert Siedler (Germany) Lance David Arnold	(Austria) Norbert Siedler (Germany) Lance David Arnold
5	(Germany) Nürburgring Nordschleife	No. 6 (Germany) Black Falcon	No. 6 (Germany) Black Falcon
5	(Germany) Nürburgring Nordschleife	(Germany) Hubert Haupt (United Kingdom) Adam Christodoulou (Switzerland) Manuel Metzger (Italy) Gabriele Piana	(Germany) Hubert Haupt (United Kingdom) Adam Christodoulou (Switzerland) Manuel Metzger (Italy) Gabriele Piana
6	(Germany) Nürburgring Nordschleife	No. 36 (Germany) Walkenhorst Motorsport	No. 4 (Germany) Falken Motorsports
6	(Germany) Nürburgring Nordschleife	(United Kingdom) David Pittard (Germany) Andreas Ziegler (Germany) Rudi Adams	(Austria) Klaus Bachler (Austria) Martin Ragginger
7	(Germany) Nürburgring Nordschleife	No. 35 (Germany) Walkenhorst Motorsport	No. 6 (Germany) Black Falcon
7	(Germany) Nürburgring Nordschleife	(France) Jordan Tresson (Germany) Rudi Adams (United Kingdom) Hunter Abbott	(Germany) Hubert Haupt (Germany) Maro Engel (Switzerland) Manuel Metzger
8	(Germany) Nürburgring Nordschleife	No. 56 (United Kingdom) Aston Martin Racing	No. 13 (Germany) AutoArena Motorsport
8	(Germany) Nürburgring Nordschleife	(Belgium) Maxime Martin (United Kingdom) Darren Turner	(Germany) Patrick Assenheimer (Austria) Dominik Baumann
9	(Germany) Nürburgring Nordschleife	No. 34 (Germany) Walkenhorst Motorsport	No. 4 (Germany) Falken Motorsports
9	(Germany) Nürburgring Nordschleife	(Norway) Christian Krognes (United Kingdom) David Pittard (Germany) Rudi Adams	(Austria) Klaus Bachler (Austria) Martin Ragginger

== See also ==
- 2018 24 Hours of Nürburgring

== Bibliography ==
- Hasso Jacoby, Patrik Koziolek & Egon Zeimers. Grüne Hölle 2018-2019: Die Langstreckenrennen auf dem Nürburgring (in German). Deutscher Sportfahrer Kreis Service und Betriebs GmbH.
