= 2016 24 Hours of Nürburgring =

Endurance motor race in Germany

2016 ADAC 24 Hours of Nürburgring

Seasons
- ← 2015 2017 →

Nürburgring 24h track (Nordschleife+GP Circuit without Mercedes-Arena)

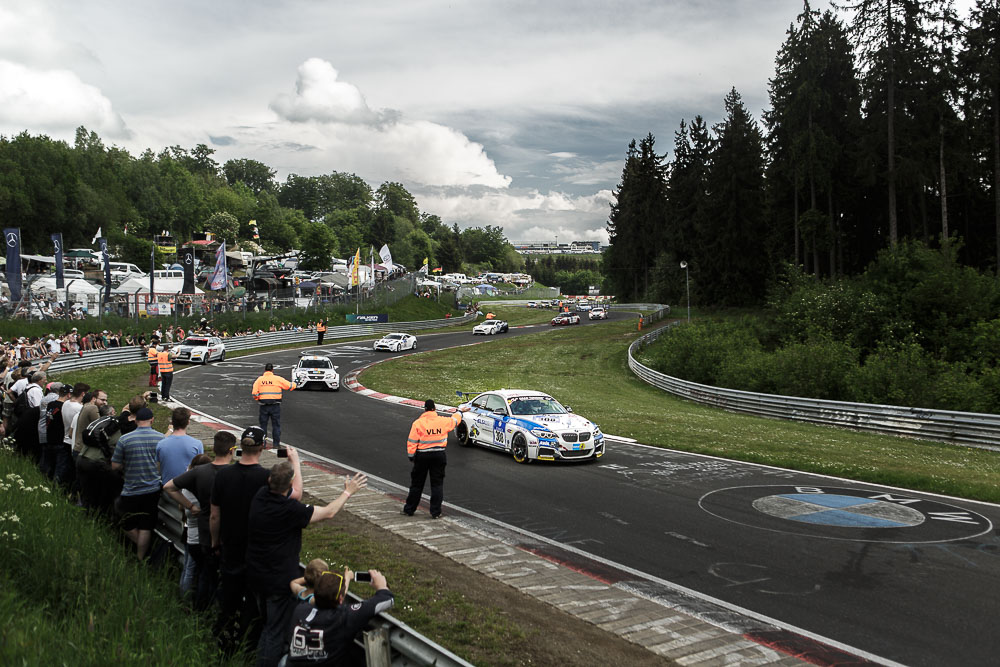
2016 24h race formation lap

The 2016 ADAC Zurich 24 Hours of Nürburgring was the 44th running of the 24 Hours of Nürburgring. It took place over 26–29 May 2016.

The #4 AMG-Team Black Falcon won the race in a Mercedes-AMG GT3 top four lockout, as Maro Engel overtook Christian Hohenadel on the final lap.

The race was red-flagged for 4 hours on Saturday afternoon due to an unusual hailstorm storm that caused a series of crashes.

== Race results ==
Class winners in bold.

Pos	Class	No.	Team	Drivers	Vehicle	Laps
1	**SP9**	**4**	**(Germany) AMG-Team Black Falcon**	**(United Kingdom) Adam Christodoulou (Germany) Maro Engel (Germany) Manuel Metzger (Germany) Bernd Schneider**	**Mercedes-AMG GT3**	**134**
2	SP9	29	(Germany) AMG-Team HTP Motorsport	(Germany) Christian Vietoris (Germany) Marco Seefried (Netherlands) Renger van der Zande (Germany) Christian Hohenadel	Mercedes-AMG GT3	134
3	SP9	88	(Germany) Haribo Racing Team-AMG	(Germany) Uwe Alzen (Germany) Lance David Arnold (Germany) Maximilian Götz (Germany) Jan Seyffarth	Mercedes-AMG GT3	133
4	SP9	9	(Germany) AMG-Team Black Falcon	(Netherlands) Yelmer Buurman (Germany) Maro Engel (Germany) Hubert Haupt (Germany) Dirk Müller	Mercedes-AMG GT3	133
5	SP9	23	(Germany) Rowe Racing	(Austria) Philipp Eng (Belgium) Maxime Martin (United Kingdom) Alexander Sims (Germany) Dirk Werner	BMW M6 GT3	133
6	SP9	75	(Germany) Mann Filter Team Zakspeed	(Germany) Sebastian Asch (Germany) Kenneth Heyer (Germany) Daniel Keilwitz (Germany) Luca Ludwig	Mercedes-AMG GT3	131
7	SP9	38	(Germany) Bentley Abt	(Germany) Christopher Brück (Austria) Fabian Hamprecht (Germany) Christian Menzel (United Kingdom) Guy Smith	Bentley Continental GT3	131
8	SP9	2	(Belgium) Audi Sport Team WRT	(Netherlands) Robin Frijns (United Kingdom) Stuart Leonard (Sweden) Edward Sandström (Belgium) Frédéric Vervisch	Audi R8 LMS	130
9	SP9	44	(Germany) Falken Motorsports	(United Kingdom) Peter Dumbreck (Germany) Wolf Henzler (Austria) Martin Ragginger (Switzerland) Alexandre Imperatori	Porsche 991 GT3 R	130
10	SP9	16	(Germany) Twin Busch Motorsport GmbH	(Germany) Dennis Busch (Germany) Marc Busch (Germany) Christian Mamerow (Germany) René Rast	Audi R8 LMS	130
11	SP9	35	(United Kingdom) Nissan GT Academy Team RJN	(United Kingdom) Alex Buncombe (Japan) Kazuki Hoshino (Germany) Michael Krumm (Spain) Lucas Ordonez	Nissan GT-R Nismo GT3	129
12	SP9	999	(Germany) Walkenhorst Motorsport	(United Kingdom) Tom Blomqvist (Sweden) Victor Bouveng (Germany) Michele Di Martino (Norway) Christian Krognes	BMW M6 GT3	129
13	SP9	21	(Germany) Wochenspiegel Team Manthey	(Germany) Oliver Kainz (Germany) Jochen Krumbach (Germany) Mike Stursberg (Germany) Georg Weiss	Porsche 991 GT3 R	128
14	SP9	11	(Hong Kong) Audi race experience	(Germany) Mike Ohlsson (Germany) Christian Bollrath (Germany) Ralf Oeverhaus (Germany) Maximilian Hackländer	Audi R8 LMS	125
15	**SP7**	**64**	**(Germany) Black Falcon Team TMD Friction**	**(Switzerland) Arturo Devigus (Germany) Mario Farnbacher (Spain) Alexander Toril (Germany) Andreas Weishaupt**	**Porsche 991 GT3 Cup**	**124**
16	SP9	12	(Germany) Manthey Racing	(Germany) Otto Klohs (Germany) "Dieter Schmidtmann" (Germany) Jens Richter (Germany) Robert Renauer	Porsche 991 GT3 R	123
17	SP9	37	(Germany) Bentley Abt	(Germany) Christopher Brück (Germany) Marco Holzer (Germany) Christer Jöns (United Kingdom) Steven Kane	Bentley Continental GT3	123
18	SP9	33	(Germany) Car Collection Motorsport	(Germany) "G. Tonic" (Germany) Ronnie Saurenmann (Germany) Peter Schmidt (Germany) Andreas Ziegler	Audi R8 LMS	123
19	SP7	56	(Germany) Frikadelli Racing Team	(United States) John Shoffner (United States) Janine Hill (Germany) Arno Klasen (Netherlands) Duncan Huisman	Porsche 991 GT3 Cup	122
20	**SP3T**	**106**	**(Japan) Subaru Tecnica International**	**(Germany) Marcel Lasée (Germany) Tim Schrick (Netherlands) Carlo van Dam (Japan) Hideki Yamauchi**	**Subaru WRX STi**	**121**
21	SP7	57	(Germany) Kremer Racing	(Germany) Eberhard Baunach (France) Philippe Haezebrouck (Germany) Wolfgang Kaufmann (Germany) Edgar Salewsky	Porsche 997 KR	121
22	SP9	101	(Germany) Walkenhorst Motorsport	(Finland) Mathias Henkola (New Zealand) Tony Richardson (Germany) Max Sandritter (Japan) Kazunori Yamauchi	BMW M6 GT3	121
23	**SP-X**	**170**	**(Germany) Manthey Racing**	**(Germany) Christoph Breuer (Germany) Christian Gebhardt (Germany) Lars Kern**	**Porsche Cayman GT4**	**121**
24	**SP-Pro**	**36**	**(Japan) Toyota Gazoo Racing with Tom's**	**(Japan) Takuto Iguchi (Japan) Tatsuya Kataoka (Japan) Kazuya Oshima (Japan) Takeshi Tsuchiya**	**Lexus RC F**	**121**
25	**Cup 5**	**305**	**(Germany) Bonk Motorsport**	**(Germany) Emin Akata (Germany) Christopher Mies (Germany) Michael Schrey (Belgium) Dries Vanthoor**	**BMW M235i Racing Cup**	**120**
26	SP-X	702	(United States) Scuderia Cameron Glickenhaus	(Germany) Felipe Fernández Laser (Germany) Thomas Mutsch (Sweden) Andreas Simonsen (United States) Jeff Westphal	SCG SCG003C	119
27	Cup 5	310	(Austria) Scheid Honert Motorsport	(Germany) Rudi Adams (Austria) Thomas Jäger (Germany) Max Partl	BMW M235i Racing Cup	118
28	**Cup 3**	**354**	**(Germany) raceunion Teichmann Racing**	**(Sweden) Tommy Gråberg (Germany) Moritz Gusenbauer (Sweden) Hans Holmlund (United Kingdom) Scott Marshall**	**Porsche Cayman GT4 CS**	**118**
29	SP7	68	(Germany) HRT Performance	(Germany) Michael Czyborra (Germany) Stefan Kenntemich (Germany) Kim Hauschild (Italy) Sergio Negroni	Porsche 991 GT3	117
30	Cup 5	303	(Germany) Pixum Team Adrenalin Motorsport	(Germany) Uwe Ebertz (Germany) Norbert Fischer (Germany) Daniel Zils	BMW M235i Racing Cup	117
31	**V6**	**140**	**(Germany) Black Falcon Team TMD Friction**	**(Germany) Aurel Schoeller (Germany) Andre Kuhn (Germany) "Philip" (Spain) Miguel Toril**	**Porsche 991**	**116**
32	SP3T	105	(Germany) MSC Sinzig e.V.	(Germany) Rudi Speich (Germany) Roland Waschkau (Germany) Dirk Vleugels (Germany) Nils Jung	Audi TT	116
33	**TCR**	**201**	**(Germany) mathilda racing — Team pistenkids**	**(Germany) Georg Niederberger (Germany) Jürgen Wohlfahrt (Germany) Andreas Gulden (Spain) Jordi Gené**	**SEAT León TCR**	**116**
34	V6	137	(Germany) Team Mathol Racing e.V.	(Switzerland) Ivan Jacoma (Germany) Claudius Karch (Germany) Timo Molig (Germany) Marc Hennerici	Porsche Cayman S	116
35	**SP6**	**83**	**(Germany) rent2drive racing**	**(Germany) David Ackermann (Germany) Carsten Welschar (Germany) Jorg Wiskirchen (Hungary) Csaba Walter**	**Porsche GT3 Cup**	**114**
36	SP7	58	(Germany) 9und11 Racing	(Germany) Georg Goder (Germany) Dirk Leßmeister (Germany) Martin Schluter (Germany) Tim Scheerbarth	Porsche 991 GT3 Cup	114
37	Cup 5	318	(Germany) FK Performance	(Germany) Patrick Hinte (Germany) Alex Lambertz (Switzerland) Yannick Mettler (Germany) Thorsten Wolter	BMW M235i Racing Cup	113
38	Cup 3	353	(Germany) Team Mathol Racing e.V.	(Germany) Marc Keilwerth (Germany) Volker Wawer (Germany) Rob Thomson (Germany) Winfried Assmann	Porsche Cayman GT4 CS	113
39	**Cup 1**	**251**	**(Germany) Lubner Motorsport**	**(Germany) Michael Bruggenkamp (Germany) Schroder (Germany) Johann Wanger (Germany) Stefan Tribelhorn**	**Opel Astra OPC Cup**	**112**
40	Cup 5	316	(Germany) FK Performance	(Germany) Fabian Finck (Germany) Michael Mohr (Luxembourg) Yann Munhowen (Germany) Andreas Schaflitzl	BMW M235i Racing Cup	111
41	Cup 1	252	(Germany) Lubner Motorsport	(Germany) Marcel Hartl (Switzerland) Roger Vögeli (Germany) Jens Wulf (Finland) Ilkka Kariste	Opel Astra OPC Cup	111
42	**V4**	**141**	**(Germany) Pixum Team Adrenalin Motorsport**	**(Germany) Christopher Rink (Germany) Danny Brink (Italy) Gabriele Piana (Germany) Niklas Steinhaus**	**BMW E90**	**111**
43	Cup 5	308	(Germany) Team Securtal Sorg Rennsport	(Germany) Heiko Eichenberg (Germany) Kevin Warum (Germany) Joachim Gunther (Germany) Moritz Oberheim	BMW M235i Racing Cup	111
44	V4	161	(Germany) Team AutoArenA Motorsport	(Germany) Patrick Assenheimer (Germany) Marc Marbach (Germany) Moritz Gusenbauer	Mercedes-Benz C230	110
45	SP8	45	(Germany) TC-R & Vetter Motorsport	(Germany) Philipp Goschel (Germany) Dirk Heldmann (Germany) Scheibner (Germany) Frank Weishar	BMW M3 E92	110
46	Cup 5	320	(Germany) Walkenhorst Motorsport	(Germany) Thomas D. Hetzer (Germany) Stephan Kruse (Germany) Karsten Kramer (Germany) Wolfgang Weber	BMW M235i Racing Cup	110
47	SP9	1	(Belgium) Audi Sport Team WRT	(Belgium) Laurens Vanthoor (Germany) Christopher Mies (Switzerland) Nico Müller (Germany) Pierre Kaffer	Audi R8 LMS	109
48	Cup 5	301	(Germany) Pixum Team Adrenalin Motorsport	(Jordan) Nadir Zuhour (United Arab Emirates) Mohammed Al-Owais (United Arab Emirates) Bashar Mardini (Norway) Einar Thorsen	BMW M235i Racing Cup	109
49	**V5**	**156**	**(Germany) Schmickler Performance**	**(Germany) Albert Egbert (Germany) Maik Rönnefarth (Germany) Michael Hollerweger**	**BMW 330i**	**108**
50	**V2T**	**176**	**(Germany) rent2Drive-racing**	**(Germany) Axel Jahn (Germany) Andrei Sidorenko (Germany) Florian Quante (Germany) Bernd Kleeschulte**	**Renault Mégane RS**	**108**
51	SP6	85	(Switzerland) Hofor-Racing	(Switzerland) Chantal Kroll (Germany) Martin Kroll (Germany) Bernd Kupper (Germany) Lars Juergen Zander	BMW M3 CSL	108
52	**SP8T**	**47**	**(Germany) TC-R & Vetter Motorsport**	**(Germany) Hans-Martin Gass (Germany) Heiko Hahn (Germany) Roland Konrad (Germany) Kristian Vetter**	**BMW E82**	**108**
53	**AT**	**111**	**(United Kingdom) Saxon Motorsport**	**(United Kingdom) Nick Barrow (United Kingdom) Dave Cox (Australia) Ric Shaw (United States) Jamie Morrow**	**BMW 135D GTR**	**108**
54	SP8T	51	(Germany) Team Securtal Sorg Rennsport	(Denmark) Niels Borum (Germany) Degnbol Moller (New Zealand) Michael Eden (New Zealand) Wayne Moore	BMW 335i	108
55	V5	154	(Switzerland) Hofor Racing	(United Kingdom) Simon Glenn (United Kingdom) Jody Halse (United Kingdom) Marcos Burnett (United Kingdom) Cemal Osman	BMW E36 M3	106
56	SP8	65	(United Kingdom) Aston Martin Test Centre	(Germany) Heinz-Jürgen Kroner (Germany) Wolfgang Schuhbauer (Germany) Ulrich Bez (Germany) Tobias Neuser	Aston Martin Vantage V12	106
57	SP3T	103	(Germany) Team Mathol Racing e.V.	(Germany) Jörg Kittelmann (Germany) Klaus Müller (Germany) Thomas Heinrich	Seat Leon Supercopa	106
58	Cup 1	253	(Germany) Team WS Racing	(Germany) Bernhard Henzel (Germany) Stephan Kuhs (Belgium) Jean-Luc Behets (Germany) Ralf Lammering	Opel Astra OPC Cup	105
59	SP8	43	(Switzerland) AF Racing AG / R Motorsport	(Switzerland) Andreas Banziger (Australia) Peter Leemhuis (Austria) Florian Kamelger (Australia) Rose Mal	Aston Martin V8 Vantage	105
60	AT	113		(Germany) Thomas Hanisch (Germany) Michael Eichhorn (Finland) Markku Honkanen (Germany) Bastian Goercke	Audi A4 quattro	105
61	V2T	177		(Germany) Volker Strycek (Germany) Lena Strycek (Germany) Robin Strycek	Opel Astra J OPC	105
62	V4	157	(Germany) Manheller Racing	(Japan) Yutaka Seki (United States) David Quinlan (Germany) Hajo Müller (Germany) Jens Noeske	BMW E90	105
63	**SP3**	**118**		**(Japan) Junichi Umemoto (Germany) Lutz Rühl (Japan) Kouichi Okumura (Japan) Teruhiko Hamano**	**Renault Clio Cup**	**105**
64	SP8	53	(Germany) Ring Racing	(Switzerland) Christoph Wüest (Liechtenstein) Thomas Lampert (Switzerland) Manuel Amweg (Germany) Marc-Remo Kündig	Lexus ISF CCS-R	105
65	**SP2T**	**134**	**(South Korea) Hyundai Motor Deutschland GmbH**	**(Germany) Joachim Kiesch (Germany) Jürgen Nett (Germany) Timo Schupp (Germany) Alexander Köppen**	**Hyundai Veloster 1,6T**	**104**
66	SP8	50		(Germany) Stephan Wolflick (Switzerland) Urs Bressan (Germany) Jurgen Gagstatter (Germany) Tim Neuser	Ford Mustang	104
67	SP3	126	(Germany) Kgl. AMC Sankt Vi	(Germany) "Brody" (Poland) Maciej Dreszer (Belgium) Olivier Muytjens (Italy) Bruno Barbaro	Toyota GT86	104
68	V6	138	(Germany) Team Mathol Racing e.V.	(Germany) Christian Eichner (Switzerland) Rudiger Schicht (Germany) Sebastian Schäfer (Germany) Herbert von Danwitz	Porsche Cayman S	104
69	SP8	46	(Germany) TC-R & Vetter Motorsport	(Germany) Thomas Ahles (Germany) Dierk Möller (Germany) Tom Moran (Germany) Rudi Adams	BMW E82	103
70	V5	152	(Germany) Pixum Team Adrenalin Motorsport	(Germany) Andreas Winkler (Germany) Michael Klotz (Germany) Holger Kroth (Germany) Urs Zünd	BMW Z4 E86	103
71	**SP4T**	**110**	**(Germany) AC 1927 Mayen e.V.**	**(Germany) Dr. Stefan Lohn (Germany) Andre Benninghofen (Germany) Maik Kraske (Germany) Marc Jaussi**	**Volkswagen Golf 5 R-Line GTI**	**103**
7	SP8	52	(Germany) Ring Racing	(Germany) Uwe Kleen (Japan) Masashige Itou (Germany) Klaus Völker (Germany) Horst Baumann	Lexus ISF CCS-R	103
73	SP3	123	Toyota Team Thailand	(Thailand) Arto Smittachartch (Thailand) Nattavude Charoensukawattana (Thailand) Kulapalanont Manat (Thailand) Hortongkum Nattapong	Toyota Corolla Altis	102
74	V4	162	(Germany) MSC Adenau e.V. im ADAC	(Germany) Michael Monch (Germany) Jan von Kiedrowski (South Korea) Choi Jang (Netherlands) Marco van Ramshorst	BMW 325i E90	101
75	Cup 5	302	(Germany) Pixum Team Adrenalin Motorsport	(Romania) Bogdan Capusan (Italy) Alessandro Cremascoli (Germany) Ralph-Peter Rink (Germany) Michael Hofmann	BMW M235i Racing Cup	101
76	Cup 1	250	(Germany) Lubner Motorsport	(Switzerland) Sandro Rothenberger (Germany) Norbert Mehling (Germany) Rogerio Carvalhais (United States) Matthew McFadden	Opel Astra OPC Cup	100
77	V2T	178	(Germany) Pro handicap. Ev.	(Germany) Wolfgang Müller (Germany) Felix Horn (Germany) Markus Horn	Volkswagen Scirocco Cup R	100
78	SP3	150	(Germany) AC 1927 Mayen e.V. i. ADAC	(Germany) Ralph Liesenfeld (Germany) Sebastian Durik (Germany) Ralf Wiesner (Germany) Carsten Erpenbach	Volkswagen Golf 3 16V	99
79	**V3**	**169**	**(Belgium) KGL. Auto-Moto-Club St.Vi**	**(Belgium) Jacques Derenne (Belgium) Kurt Dujardyn (Belgium) Olivier Muytjens (Belgium) "Brody"**	**Toyota GT86**	**99**
80	Cup 3	355	(Belgium) Mühlner Motorsport	(Luxembourg) Daniel Bohr (Germany) Frank Schmickler (Germany) Pierre Humbert	Porsche Cayman GT4 CS	99
81	SP2T	132		(Germany) Ralf Zensen (Germany) Jurgen Bretschneider (Germany) Steven Fursch (Germany) Ralph Beck	BMW Mini	99
82	V2T	175	(Germany) mathilda racing — Team pistenkids	(Germany) Michael Paatz (Germany) Knut Kluge (Germany) Josef Kocsis (Germany) Joerg Chmiela	Volkswagen Scirocco GT-RS	98
83	SP3	124	Toyota Team Thailand	(Thailand) Grant Supaphongs (Thailand) Hortongkum Nattapong (Thailand) Ruengsomboon Arthit (Taiwan) Chen Jian Hong	Toyota Corolla Altis	97
84	SP2T	326	(Japan) Toyota Gazoo Racing	(Japan) Masahiko Kageyama (Japan) Tomoyuki Katayama (Germany) Herwig Daenens	Toyota C-HR Racing	97
85	V4	142	(Germany) Pixum Team Adrenalin Motorsport	(Germany) Ioannis Smyrlis (Germany) Klaus-Dieter Frommer (Germany) Uwe Mallwitz (South Korea) Hui Byung	BMW E90	96
86	V6	139	(Germany) Team Securtal Sorg Rennsport	(Germany) Peter Haener (United Kingdom) Paul Follet (Italy) Ugo Vicenzi (Italy) Alberto Carobbio	Porsche Cayman S	95
87	SP3	119		(Germany) Daniel Overbeck (Germany) Tobias Overbeck (Germany) Thomas Overbeck (Germany) Cassandra Reichie	Renault Clio 3 RS	95
88	V6	145	(Argentina) Speedworxx Racing	(Argentina) Jose Visir (Argentina) Jorge Cersosimo (Argentina) Alejandro Chawan (Argentina) Marcos Vazquez	Porsche 911	93
89	Cup 1	254	(Germany) Team WS Racing	(Austria) Friedrich Rabensteiner (Germany) Uwe Stein (Germany) Tatjana Hanser (Germany) Christoph Hewer	Opel Astra OPC Cup	93
90	SP3T	102	(South Korea) Hyundai Motor Deutschland GmbH	(Luxembourg) Daniel Bohrer (Finland) Rory Penttinen (Belgium) Bruno Beulen (Germany) Alexander K-n	Hyundai i30 2.0T	91
91	Cup 5	304	(Germany) Bonk Motorsport	(Germany) Axel Burghardt (Germany) Peter Bonk (Germany) Jens Moetefindt (Germany) Andreas Montmann	BMW M235i Racing Cup	91
92	AT	115		(Germany) Christian Gatterer (Norway) Johan Sandberg	BMW E34	91
93	TCR	204	(Germany) racing one GmbH	(Germany) Benjamin Leuchter (Germany) Fabian Danz (Germany) Tim Zimmermann (Germany) Dennis Wüsthoff	Volkswagen Golf GTI TCR	91
93	SP5	93	(Germany) Leutheuser Racing & Events	(Austria) Richard Purtscher (Germany) Harald Rettich (France) Fabrice Reicher (France) Dominique Nury	BMW 1M-Coupe	74
94	SP6	84	(Switzerland) Hofor-Racing	(Switzerland) Chantal Kroll (Switzerland) Martin Kroll (Switzerland) Michael Kroll (Switzerland) Roland Eggimann	BMW M3 GTR	90
95	SP3	130	(Germany) MSC Adenau e.V. im ADAC	(Germany) Tobias Jung (Germany) Marcel Müller (France) Patrick Boidron (Germany) Andreas Kunert	Opel Calibra	85
96	SP2T	136	(Germany) Manheller Racing	(United Kingdom) Dale Lomas (Germany) Lucian Gavris (United Kingdom) Bradley Philpot (United Kingdom) Anthony Gaylard	Ford Fiesta ST	85
97	SP2T	133	(South Korea) Hyundai Motor Deutschland GmbH	(Germany) Tim Schrick (Germany) Peter Schumann (Germany) Guido Naumann (Germany) Heiko Hammel	Hyundai i30 1.6T	82
98	**SP10 GT4**	**77**	**(Australia) STADAvita Racing Team**	**(Switzerland) Jean Hertenstein (United Kingdom) Scott Preacher (Switzerland) "Takis" (Germany) Markus Lungstrass**	**Aston Martin V8 Vantage**	**79**
99	AT	114	(Germany) OVR Racing	(Germany) Ralph Caba (Germany) Klaus Volker Lange (Germany) Oliver Sprungmann	Ford Focus RS	75
100	**V3T**	**171**	**(Germany) Race-House Motorsport**	**(Germany) Dag von Garrel (Germany) Carsten Ohlinger (United Kingdom) Meyrick Cox**	**BMW M 235i**	**73**
101	Cup 5	317	(Germany) FK Performance	(Luxembourg) Alain Pier (Germany) Thomas Muller (Germany) Udo Schauland (Germany) Andreas Ott	BMW M235i Racing Cup	71
NC	Cup 5	309	(Germany) Team Mathol Racing e.V.	(Germany) Christian Volz (Germany) Andre Duve (Germany) Raphael Hundeborn (Germany) Oliver Louisoder	BMW M235i Racing Cup	64
NC	SP9	18	(Germany) Schubert Motorsport	(Brazil) Augusto Farfus (Finland) Jesse Krohn (Germany) Jörg Müller (Germany) Marco Wittmann	BMW M6 GT3	60
NC	SP3	127	(Germany) aufkleben.de — Motorsport	(Germany) Stephan Epp (Germany) Michael Uelwer (Germany) Dr. Volker Carsten (Germany) Gerrit Holthaus	Renault Clio RS Cup	33
DNF	SP9	5	(Germany) Phoenix Racing	(Germany) Frank Stippler (Denmark) Anders Fjordbach (Italy) Edoardo Mortara (Austria) Nikolaus Mayr-Melnhof	Audi R8 LMS	117
DNF	SP9	25	(Austria) Konrad Motorsport GmbH	(Germany) Christopher Zöchling (Austria) Franz Konrad (Germany) Dominik Farnbacher (Germany) Luca Stolz	Lamborghini Huracán GT3	111
DNF	SP9	912	(Germany) Manthey Racing	(Austria) Richard Lietz (Germany) Jörg Bergmeister (Denmark) Michael Christensen (France) Frédéric Makowiecki	Porsche 991 GT3 R	100
DNF	SP3T	104	(Finland) LMS Engineering	(United States) Christopher Tiger (Armenia) Artur Goroyan (Germany) Ulrich Andree (Germany) Philipp Leisen	Audi TT RS2	99
DNF	SP-X	701	(United States) Scuderia Cameron Glickenhaus	(Germany) Manuel Lauck (France) Franck Mailleux (Netherlands) Jeroen Bleekemolen (Germany) Felipe Fernández Laser	SCG SCG003C	98
DNF	SP8	42	(United Kingdom) Aston Martin Test Centre	(United Kingdom) Peter Cate (Austria) Florian Kamelger (United Kingdom) Darren Turner (Germany) Andreas Gulden	Aston Martin Vantage GT8	96
DNF	SP9	100	(Germany) Schubert Motorsport	(United States) John Edwards (Germany) Jens Klingmann (Germany) Lucas Luhr (Germany) Martin Tomczyk	BMW M6 GT3	93
DNF	SP7	67		(Germany) Oleg Kvitka (Germany) Florian Scholze (Germany) Fabian Schiller (Germany) Guido Wirtz	Porsche 991 GT3 MR	85
DNF	SP7	62	(Germany) GetSpeed Performance	(Germany) Adam Osieka (Thailand) Kiki Nana (Germany) "Andy Sammers" (Luxembourg) Steve Jans	Porsche 991 GT3 Cup	82
DNF	V5	151	(Germany) Pixum Team Adrenalin Motorsport	(Germany) Christian Bullesbach (Germany) Andreas Schettler (United States) Jim Briody (Spain) Carlos Arimon	Porsche Cayman	78
DNF	SP7	69	(Germany) Clickvers.de Team	(Germany) Robin Chrzanowski (Germany) Kersten Jodexnis (Germany) Marco Schelp (New Zealand) Peter Scharmach	Porsche 997 GT3	77
DNF	SP9	6	(Germany) Audi Sport Team Phoenix	(Germany) Christopher Haase (Germany) René Rast (Germany) Markus Winkelhock (Germany) Frank Stippler	Audi R8 LMS	67
DNF	SP9	28	(Germany) Montaplast By Land-Motorsport	(Germany) Marc Basseng (United States) Connor De Phillippi (Germany) Mike Rockenfeller (Germany) Timo Scheider	Audi R8 LMS	67
DNF	SP3T	107		(Germany) Patrick Prill (Germany) Marcelger Willert (Germany) Jens Ludmann (Germany) Steffen Schlichenmeier	Ford Focus ST	67
DNF	AT	112	(Germany) Care for Climate	(Germany) "Smudo" (Germany) Thomas von Löwis of Menar (Germany) Daniel Schellhaas (Germany) Axel Duffner	Porsche Cayman GT4	63
DNF	SP9	14	(Germany) Black Falcon	(Saudi Arabia) Abdulaziz Bin Turki Al Faisal (Germany) "Gerwin" (Netherlands) Indy Dontje (United Kingdom) Robert Huff	Mercedes-AMG GT3	57
DNF	SP9	22	(Germany) Rowe Racing	(Germany) Klaus Graf (United Kingdom) Richard Westbrook (Netherlands) Nicky Catsburg (Finland) Markus Palttala	BMW M6 GT3	57
DNF	SP7	63	(Germany) GetSpeed Performance	(Germany) Ulrich Berg (Liechtenstein) Patrik Kaiser (United States) Dennis Trebing (Germany) Danny Brinkmann	Porsche 991 GT3 Cup	55
DNF	SP7	54	(Germany) raceunion Teichmann Racing	(Germany) "Airgee" (Germany) "Alex Autumn" (Czech Republic) Milan Kodidek (Italy) Andrea Perlini	Porsche 997 GT3 Cup	53
DNF	AT	13	(Austria) skate aid e.V.	(Germany) Titus Dittmann (Germany) Bernd Albrecht (Germany) Reinhard Schall (Germany) Michael Lachmayer	Chrysler (Dodge) Viper	53
DNF	SP9	3	(Germany) Frikadelli Racing Team	(Germany) Klaus Abbelen (Germany) Sabine Schmitz (Netherlands) Patrick Huisman (Austria) Norbert Siedler	Porsche 991 GT3 R	50
DNF	V5	155	(United States) Rotek Racing	(United States) Robb Holland (United States) David Thilenius (United States) Jonathan Miller	BMW Z4	49
DNF	SP9	24	(Germany) Team Zakspeed	(Germany) Hans-Martin Gassner (Germany) Florian Strauss (Netherlands) Tom Coronel	Nissan GT-R Nismo GT3	46
DNF	SP10 GT4	078	(Germany) Team Securtal Sorg Rennsport	(Germany) Oliver Bender (Germany) Stefan Beyer (Germany) Torsten Kratz (Germany) Friedhelm Mihm	BMW M3 GT4	45
DNF	V6	158	(Germany) aesthetic racing	(Germany) Dr. Stein Tveten (Norway) Oskar Sandberg (Germany) Yannick Fubrich	Porsche 911/991	43
DNF	V3	168		(Germany) Jens Richter (Germany) Armin Schwarz (Germany) Oliver Bender (Germany) Victor Smolski	Subaru BRZ	43
DNF	SP9	30	(Germany) AMG-Team HTP Motorsport	(Germany) Dominik Baumann (Germany) Stefan Mücke (Germany) Maximilian Buhk	Mercedes-AMG GT3	42
DNF	Cup 5	319	(Germany) Walkenhorst Motorsport	(United Kingdom) Chris Mealin (United Kingdom) Guy Riall (United Kingdom) Stephen Liquorish (Germany) Marc Ehret	BMW M235i Racing Cup	38
DNF	SP3T	188	(Japan) Toyota Gazoo Racing	(Japan) Takayuki Kinoshita (Japan) Takamitsu Matsui (Japan) Naoya Gamou (Japan) "Morizo"	Lexus RC	38
DNF	SP10 GT4	79	(Germany) Prosport Performance GmbH	(Denmark) Nicolaj Møller Madsen (Germany) Michael Rebhan (Germany) Jorg Viebahn (Germany) Michael Hess	Porsche Cayman Pro4	36
DNF	V6	146	(Argentina) Speedworxx Racing	(Argentina) Alessandro Salerno (Argentina) Alfredo Tricarichi (Argentina) Alessandro Salerno (Argentina) Roberto Falcon	Porsche Cayman S	36
DNF	SP7	59	(Germany) Manthey Racing	(Austria) Harald Proczyk (Germany) Reinhold Renger (Germany) Nils Reimer (United Kingdom) Guy Smith	Porsche 991 GT3 Cup MR	35
DNF	SP9	99	(Germany) Walkenhorst Motorsport	(Germany) Henry Walkenhorst (Germany) Peter Posavac (Germany) Daniela Schmid (Netherlands) Jaap van Lagen	BMW Z4 GT3	35
DNF	SP7	55		(Australia) Wayne Moore (United Kingdom) Bill Cameron (Germany) Peter Bonk	Porsche 991 Carrera Cup	33
DNF	SP9	007	(United Kingdom) Aston Martin Racing	(Portugal) Pedro Lamy (Denmark) Marco Sørensen (Denmark) Nicki Thiim (United Kingdom) Darren Turner	Aston Martin V12 Vantage GT3	32
DNF	SP10 GT4	76	(Germany) Team Mathol Racing e.V.	(Germany) Wolfgang Weber (Germany) Norbert Bermes (Germany) Marc Hennerici	Aston Martin V8 Vantage	31
DNF	SP9	10	(Hong Kong) Audi race experience	(Hong Kong) Marchy Lee (Hong Kong) Shaun Thong (China) Franky Cheng (Malaysia) Alex Yoong	Audi R8 LMS	30
DNF	Cup 3	351	(Germany) Black Falcon Team TMD Friction	(Norway) Christian Bjorn-Hansen (Norway) Runar Vatne (Germany) "Sugar Mountain" (Germany) Stefan Karg	Porsche Cayman GT4 CS	27
DNF	SP3	117		(Germany) Jürgen Peter (Sweden) Claus Gronning (Germany) "Rennsemmel"	Renault Clio	27
DNF	TCR	202	(Germany) mathilda racing — Team pistenkids	(Germany) Michael Paatz (Germany) Klaus Niedzwiedz (Germany) Axel Friedhoff (Germany) Max Friedhoff	SEAT León TCR	25
DNF	V4	160	(Germany) Team Securtal Sorg Rennsport	(Estonia) Erki Koldits (Estonia) Roul Liideman (Germany) Ulf Wickop (Germany) Ralf Goral	BMW 325i	25
DNF	SP9	8	(Germany) Haribo Racing Team-AMG	(Germany) Uwe Alzen (Germany) Lance David Arnold (Germany) Maximilian Götz (Germany) Jan Seyffarth	Mercedes-AMG GT3	23
DNF	SP8T	48	(Germany) Schulze Motorsport	(Germany) Michael Schulze (Germany) Tobias Schulze (France) Jordan Tresson (Russia) Mark Shulzhitskiy	Nissan GT-R	18
DNF	SP4T	96	(Germany) Team S. Pace-Racing	(Germany) Markus Löhnert (Germany) Matthias Wasel (Germany) Christian Schmitz (Germany) Mike Jäger	Audi TT RS	18
DNF	SP9	27	(United Kingdom) Aston Martin Racing	(United Kingdom) Jonathan Adam (Brazil) Fernando Rees (Austria) Mathias Lauda (New Zealand) Richie Stanaway	Aston Martin V12 Vantage GT3	17
DNF	SP3	120	(Germany) Schlaug Motorsport	(Mexico) Xavier Lamadrid Jr. (Mexico) Xavier Lamadrid (United Kingdom) Massimiliano Girardo (Spain) Nicolas Abril	Renault Clio RS Cup	7
DNF	SP6	82	(Germany) Prosport-Performance GmbH	(Germany) Fidel Leib (Sweden) Jonas Carlsson (South Africa) Kelvin van der Linde (Germany) Thomas Bolz	Porsche Cayman Pro4	4
DNF	SP6	350	(Germany) Prosport-Performance GmbH	(United States) Charles Putman (United States) Charles Espenlaub (Belgium) Nico Verdonck (Netherlands) Xavier Maassen	Porsche Cayman GT4 CS	4
DNF	SP3	122	(Germany) Kissling Motorsport	(Germany) Olaf Beckmann (Germany) Volker Strycek (Germany) Peter Hass (Germany) Jürgen Schulten	Opel Manta (Flying Fox) GT	3
DNF	SP9	911	(Germany) Manthey Racing	(United Kingdom) Nick Tandy (France) Kévin Estre (New Zealand) Earl Bamber (France) Patrick Pilet	Porsche 991 GT3 R	1
DNF	SP8	135	(Japan) Toyota Gazoo Racing	(Japan) Yoshinobu Katsumata (Japan) Masahiko Kageyama (Japan) Kazuya Oshima	Lexus ISF CCS-R	1
DNS	SP7	70	(Germany) Huber Motorsport	(Germany) Michael Hagen (Germany) Reinhard Huber (Germany) Philipp Neuffer (Germany) Chris Rendlen	Porsche 911 GT3 Cup	0
DNS	SP9	998	(Germany) Walkenhorst Motorsport	(Sweden) Victor Bouveng (United Kingdom) Tom Blomqvist (Norway) Christian Krognes (Germany) Michele Di Martino	BMW M6 GT3	0
DNS	E1-XP	703	(United States) Scuderia Cameron Glickenhaus	(United Kingdom) Jethro Bovington (Germany) Manuel Lauck (United Kingdom) Chris Harris (Germany) Patrick Bernhardt	SCG P4/5 Competizione M16	0
DNS	SP9	31	(Germany) AMG-Team HTP Motorsport	(Germany) Maximilian Buhk (Germany) Stefan Mücke (Netherlands) Renger van der Zande (Germany) Christian Hohenadel	Mercedes-AMG GT3	0

== Bibliography ==
- Jörg-Richard Ufer & Tim Upietz. 24 Stunden Nürburgring Nordschleife 2016. Gruppe C Motorsport Verlag. ISBN 978-3-928540-84-1.
