= 2014 24 Hours of Nürburgring =

Endurance motor race in Germany

Nürburgring 24h track (Nordschleife+GP Circuit without Mercedes-Arena)

The 2014 ADAC Zurich 24 Hours of Nürburgring was the 42nd running of the 24 Hours of Nürburgring. It took place over June 19–22, 2014. The race set a new record for the total distance driven during a Nürburgring 24-hour race with 4,035 km (159 laps) driven by the top two cars.

The #4 Phoenix Racing team won the race on an Audi R8 LMS Ultra.

== Race results ==
Class winners in bold.

| Pos | Class | No | Team | Drivers | Vehicle | Laps |
|---|---|---|---|---|---|---|
| 1 | **SP9 GT3** | **4** | **(Germany) Phoenix Racing** | **(Germany) Christopher Haase (Germany) Christian Mamerow (Germany) René Rast (Germany) Markus Winkelhock** | **Audi R8 LMS Ultra** | **159** |
| 2 | SP9 GT3 | 1 | (Germany) Black Falcon Team Reissdorf Alkoholfrei | (Netherlands) Jeroen Bleekemolen (Sweden) Andreas Simonsen (Germany) Christian Menzel (Germany) Lance David Arnold | Mercedes-Benz SLS AMG GT3 | 159 |
| 3 | SP9 GT3 | 22 | (Germany) Rowe Racing | (Germany) Michael Zehe (Germany) Christian Hohenadel (Germany) Nico Bastian (Germany) Maro Engel | Mercedes-Benz SLS AMG GT3 | 157 |
| 4 | SP9 GT3 | 44 | (Germany) Falken Motorsports | (Germany) Wolf Henzler (United Kingdom) Peter Dumbreck (Austria) Martin Ragginger (Switzerland) Alexandre Imperatori | Porsche 911 GT3 R 997 | 157 |
| 5 | SP9 GT3 | 7 | (United Kingdom) Aston Martin Racing | (Germany) Stefan Mücke (United Kingdom) Darren Turner (Portugal) Pedro Lamy | Aston Martin V12 Vantage GT3 | 157 |
| 6 | SP9 GT3 | 20 | (Germany) BMW Sports Trophy Team Schubert | (Germany) Jens Klingmann (Austria) Dominik Baumann (Germany) Claudia Hürtgen (Germany) Martin Tomczyk | BMW Z4 GT3 | 157 |
| 7 | SP9 GT3 | 15 | (Germany) HTP Motorsport GmbH | (Switzerland) Harold Primat (Germany) Maximilian Götz (Germany) Kenneth Heyer (Germany) Roland Rehfeld | Mercedes-Benz SLS AMG GT3 | 156 |
| 8 | SP9 GT3 | 28 | (Germany) Walkenhorst Motorsport powered by Dunlop | (Germany) Ferdinand Stuck (Germany) Maximilian Sandritter (Germany) Christopher Brück (Germany) Dennis Rostek | BMW Z4 GT3 | 154 |
| 9 | SP9 GT3 | 502 | (Hong Kong) Audi race experience | (Austria) Felix Baumgartner (Germany) Marco Werner (Germany) Frank Biela (Germany) Pierre Kaffer | Audi R8 LMS ultra | 153 |
| 10 | SP9 GT3 | 16 | (Germany) Busch, Dennis | (Germany) Dennis Busch (Germany) Marc Busch (Germany) Manuel Lauck (Austria) Stefan Landmann | Audi R8 LMS ultra | 152 |
| 11 | **SP-PRO** | **53** | **(Japan) Gazoo Racing** | **(Japan) Akira Iida (Japan) Juichi Wakisaka (Japan) Takuto Iguchi** | **Lexus LFA Code X** | **151** |
| 12 | **SP7** | **56** | **(Germany) Black Falcon Team Reissdorf Alkoholfrei** | **(Germany) Andreas Weishaupt (Germany) Maik Rosenberg (Germany) Hannes Plesse (Germany) David Jahn** | **Porsche 911 GT3 Cup** | **150** |
| 13 | **SP8** | **48** | **(Japan) Gazoo Racing** | **(Japan) Takayuki Kinoshita (Japan) Hiroaki Ishiura (Japan) Kazuya Oshima (Japan) Akio Toyoda ("Morizo")** | **Lexus LFA** | **148** |
| 14 | SP9 GT3 | 24 | (Germany) Schulze Motorsport | (Japan) Kazunori Yamauchi (Germany) Tobias Schulze (Germany) Michael Schulze (France) Jordan Tresson | Nissan GT-R Nismo GT3 (2014) | 147 |
| 15 | SP7 | 67 | (Germany) raceunion Teichmann Racing | (Germany) Marc Hennerici (Germany) Florian Scholze (Belgium) Stef van Campenhoudt (United States) Dennis Trebing | Porsche 911 GT3 Cup | 146 |
| 16 | SP7 | 40 | (Germany) Manthey Racing | (Switzerland) Steve Smith (Germany) Nils Reimer (Germany) Reinhold Renger (Switzerland) Hari Proczyk | Porsche 911 GT3 Cup | 146 |
| 17 | SP7 | 59 | (United Kingdom) Moore, Willie | (United Kingdom) Willie Moore (United Kingdom) Bill Cameron (Germany) Peter Bonk | Porsche 997 GT3 Cup | 146 |
| 18 | SP7 | 58 | (Germany) Black Falcon Team TMD Friction | (Germany) "Friedrichs Willi" (Germany) Burkard Kaiser (Germany) Andreas Ziegler (Germany) Carsten Knechtges | Porsche 911 GT3 Cup | 145 |
| 19 | SP7 | 60 | (Germany) GetSpeed Performance | (France) Pascal Bour (France) Phlippe Haezebrouck (France) Patrick Henry | Porsche 997 GT3 Cup | 145 |
| 20 | **SP3T** | **111** | **(Germany) Raeder Motorsport** | **(Germany) Elmar Deegener (Germany) Jürgen Wohlfarth (Germany) Christoph Breuer (Germany) Dieter Schmidtmann** | **Audi TT RS 2.0** | **145** |
| 21 | SP3T | 120 | (Finland) LMS Engineering | (Germany) Daniela Schmid (United States) "Tiger Christopher" (Germany) Roland Botor (Austria) Constantin Kletzer | Audi TT RS | 144 |
| 22 | SP9 GT3 | 18 | (Hong Kong) Audi race experience | (Switzerland) Rahel Frey (Netherlands) Christiaan Frankenhout (United States) Dominique Bastien (Germany) Christian Bollrath | Audi R8 LMS ultra | 144 |
| 23 | **SP4T** | **110** | **(Switzerland) Besaplast Racing Team** | **(Croatia) Franjo Kovac (Germany) Martin Tschornia (Sweden) Fredrik Lestrup (Denmark) Kurt Thiim** | **Audi TT RS** | **144** |
| 24 | SP9 GT3 | 80 | (United Kingdom) Nissan GT Academy Team RJN | (Germany) Nick Heidfeld (United Kingdom) Alex Buncombe (Spain) Lucas Ordóñez (Germany) Florian Strauss | Nissan GT-R Nismo GT3 (2014) | 140 |
| 25 | SP7 | 61 | (Germany) GetSpeed Performance | (Germany) Adam Osieka (Luxembourg) Steve Jans (Germany) Dieter Schornstein (Germany) Andy Sammers | Porsche 997 GT3 Cup | 140 |
| 26 | SP7 | 63 | (Germany) Goder, Georg | (Germany) Georg Goder (Germany) Martin Schlüter (Germany) Dirk Leßmeister (Germany) Ralf Oehme | Porsche 997 GT3 | 140 |
| 27 | **SP10 GT4** | **91** | **(Germany) Prosport-Performance GmbH** | **(Germany) Heinz-Josef Bermes (Germany) Dominik Schöning (Argentina) Juan Manuel Silva (Germany) Thomas Koll** | **Audi TT RS** | **139** |
| 28 | **V6** | **167** | **(Germany) aesthetic racing** | **(Germany) Tveten Stein (Finland) Niko Nurminen (Germany) Yannick Fübrich** | **Porsche 911** | **139** |
| 29 | **Cup2** | **308** | **(Germany) Adrenalin-Motorsport** | **(Germany) Daniel Zils (Germany) Norbert Fischer (Germany) Uwe Ebertz (Germany) Timo Schupp** | **BMW M235i Racing** | **138** |
| 30 | V6 | 161 | (Germany) Black Falcon Team TMD Friction | (Netherlands) "Gerwin" (Netherlands) "Philip" (Switzerland) Manuel Metzger (Germany) Tim Scheerbarth | Porsche Carrera | 138 |
| 31 | SP3T | 123 | (Germany) Scuderia Colonia e.V. | (Germany) Matthias Wasel (Germany) Thomas Wasel (Germany) Marcus Löhnert (Germany) Roman Löhnert | Audi TT RS | 138 |
| 32 | SP3T | 118 | (Japan) Subaru Tecnica International | (Japan) Toshihiro Yoshida (Japan) Kota Sasaki (Germany) Marcel Lasée (Netherlands) Carlo van Dam | Subaru WRX STI | 138 |
| 33 | SP9 GT3 | 10 | (Germany) Prosperia C. Abt Racing GmbH | (Germany) Christopher Mies (Germany) Christer Jöns (Germany) Niclas Kentenich (Germany) Dominik Schwager | Audi R8 LMS ultra | 138 |
| 34 | V6 | 172 | (Germany) Team Mathol Racing e.V. | (Germany) Claudius Karch (Germany) Kai Riemer (United States) Jim Briody (United Kingdom) Scott Marshall | Porsche Cayman S | 138 |
| 35 | SP9 GT3 | 12 | (Germany) Manthey Racing | (Germany) Otto Klohs (Switzerland) Philipp Frommenwiler (Germany) Harald Schlotter (Germany) Jens Richter | Porsche 911 GT3 R | 138 |
| 36 | Cup2 | 313 | (Germany) Walkenhorst Motorsport powered by Dunlop | (Germany) Michael Schrey (Germany) Emin Akata (Germany) Mario Merten | BMW M235i Racing | 137 |
| 37 | **Cup1** | **250** | **(Germany) Kissling Motorsport** | **(Germany) Tim Schrick (Germany) Hannu Luostarinen (Germany) Volker Strycek (Switzerland) Peter Wyss** | **Opel Astra OPC Cup** | **137** |
| 38 | SP7 | 72 | (Germany) Car Collection Motorsport | (Germany) Klaus Koch (Germany) "Don Stephano" (Switzerland) Ronnie Saurenmann (Slovakia) Miroslav Konopka | Porsche 997 GT3 Cup | 137 |
| 39 | SP10 GT4 | 100 | (United Kingdom) Aston Martin Test Centre | (United Kingdom) Chris Harris (United Kingdom) Richard Meaden (Germany) Oliver Mathai (Germany) Andreas Gülden | Aston Martin Vantage V8 | 137 |
| 40 | **SP6** | **76** | **(Germany) Hedemann, Heiko** | **(Germany) Heiko Hedemann (Germany) Kevin Warum (Germany) Guido Schuchert (Germany) Dirk Vleugels** | **BMW Z4M** | **136** |
| 41 | Cup2 | 301 | (Germany) Team Scheid-Partl Motorsport | (Germany) Max Partl (Germany) Jörg Weidinger (Germany) Michael Rebhan | BMW M235i Racing | 136 |
| 42 | SP7 | 57 | (Germany) Krumbach, André | (Germany) André Krumbach (Germany) Andreas Riedl (Switzerland) Ivan Reggiani (Germany) Uwe Legermann | Porsche 997 Cup | 136 |
| 43 | SP8 | 55 | (United Kingdom) Aston Martin Test Centre | (Switzerland) Egon Allgäuer (United Kingdom) Marcus Mahy (Australia) Liam Talbot (United Kingdom) Peter Cate | Aston Martin Vantage V12 | 136 |
| 44 | Cup2 | 312 | (Germany) Wiskirchen, Jörg | (Germany) Jörg Wiskirchen (Germany) Carsten Welschar (Germany) David Ackermann (Austria) David Griessner | BMW M235i Racing | 135 |
| 45 | V6 | 159 | (Germany) Black Falcon Team TMD Friction | (Germany) Alexander Kolb (Germany) Julius-Ferdinand Kolb (Germany) Vincent Kolb (Germany) Helmut Weber | Porsche Carrera | 135 |
| 46 | SP6 | 83 | (Germany) Prosport-Performance GmbH | (Austria) Fabian Hamprecht (Germany) Tomas Moran (Switzerland) Klaus Bauer (Australia) Richard Gartner | Porsche Cayman | 135 |
| 47 | SP7 | 65 | (San Marino) GDL Racing.net | (Switzerland) Kurt Thiel (Italy) Dario Paletto (Italy) Roberto Feccio | Porsche 997 | 135 |
| 48 | V6 | 164 | (Germany) Scuderia Augustusburg Brühl e.V. i. ADAC | (Germany) Dieter Weidenbrück (Germany) Markus Schmickler (Germany) Klaus Landgraf (Germany) Maik Rönnefahrt | Porsche 991 | 135 |
| 49 | SP7 | 62 | (Germany) raceunion Teichmann Racing | (Germany) Alex Autumn (Switzerland) Jochen Schäfer (Germany) Marcel Belka (Germany) Dominik Brinkmann | Porsche 911 GT3 Cup | 135 |
| 50 | SP6 | 79 | (Switzerland) Hofor-Racing | (Switzerland) Martin Kroll (Switzerland) Chantal Kroll (Switzerland) Bruno Widmer (Switzerland) Ronny Tobler | BMW M3 CSL | 135 |
| 51 | Cup2 | 306 | (Germany) Team Ring Police | (Germany) Jan-Erik Slooten (Germany) Thomas Mühlenz (Sweden) Jonas Carlsson (Sweden) Anders Carlsson | BMW M235i Racing | 134 |
| 52 | Cup2 | 310 | (Germany) Piepenbrink, Stephan | (Germany) Stephan Piepenbrink (Germany) Andreas Schaflitzl (Luxembourg) Yann Munhowen (Germany) David Prusa | BMW M235i Racing | 134 |
| 53 | **SP8T** | **235** | **(Germany) BMW Motorsport** | **(Germany) Marcus Schurig (Switzerland) Alex Hofmann (United Kingdom) Jethro Bovingdon (Germany) Alexander Mies** | **BMW M235i Racing** | **134** |
| 54 | **SP3** | **86** | **(Japan) Gazoo Racing** | **(Japan) Masahiko Kageyama (Japan) Kumi Sato (Japan) Naoya Gamou** | **Toyota 86** | **133** |
| 55 | Cup1 | 252 | (Germany) Bonk Motorsport | (Germany) Mario Merten (Germany) Jürgen Nett (Germany) Daniela Schmid (Germany) Marc Legel | Opel Astra OPC Cup | 132 |
| 56 | Cup1 | 254 | (Germany) dmsj Youngster-Racing-Team | (Germany) Robin Strycek (Germany) Christoph Wohlfart (Germany) Sandro Marsani (Germany) Dominik Busch | Opel Astra OPC Cup | 132 |
| 57 | Cup2 | 305 | (Austria) Medilikke Motorsport | (Austria) Michael Hollerweger (Austria) Gerald Fischer (Austria) Michael Fischer (Austria) Marco Stezelow | BMW M235i Racing | 132 |
| 58 | SP7 | 54 | (Germany) Hauschild, Kim | (Germany) Kim André Hauschild (Austria) Dieter Svepes (Australia) Ric Shaw (Australia) Stephen Borness | Porsche 997 Cup | 132 |
| 59 | SP7 | 64 | (San Marino) GDL Racing.net | (Switzerland) Nicola Bravetti (Australia) Rob Thomson (United States) Jim Michaelian (Italy) Sergio Negroni | Porsche 997 | 132 |
| 60 | **V5** | **181** | **(Germany) Adrenalin-Motorsport** | **(Germany) Christian Büllesbach (Austria) Christian Drauch (Germany) Werner Gusenbauer (Germany) Josef Stengel** | **BMW Z4 3.0si** | **131** |
| 61 | Cup1 | 258 | (Germany) Lubner Event & Motorsport | (Germany) Thomas Frank (Germany) Herbert von Danwitz (Germany) Juha Karjalainen (Germany) Sepo Hunt | Opel Astra OPC Cup | 131 |
| 62 | Cup1 | 255 | (Germany) Bliss Autosport | (Germany) Lars Holtkamp (Germany) Olaf Schley (Germany) Oliver Bliss (Germany) Axel Duffner | Opel Astra OPC Cup | 131 |
| 63 | **V4** | **186** | **(Germany) Team AutoArena Motorsport** | **(Germany) Patrick Assenheimer (Germany) Marc Marbach (Germany) Hannes Pfledderer** | **Mercedes-Benz C 230** | **130** |
| 64 | V4 | 184 | (Germany) Adrenalin-Motorsport | (Germany) Matthias Unger (Germany) Christian Konnerth (Germany) Andreas Schettler (Germany) Jens Bombosch | BMW E90 325i | 130 |
| 65 | V6 | 170 | (Germany) Team Mathol Racing e.V. | (Sweden) Dag Wohlen (Sweden) Tommy Graberg (Sweden) Hans Holmlund (Germany) Gerhard Ludwig | Porsche Cayman R | 130 |
| 66 | SP6 | 84 | (Germany) Hoffmann, Kornelius | (Germany) Kornelius Hoffmann (Switzerland) Friedrich Obermeier (Germany) Max Pfeffer (Germany) Steffen Roth | BMW M3 | 130 |
| 67 | Cup2 | 311 | (Germany) Di Martino, Michele | (Germany) Michele Di Martino (Germany) Jannik Olivo (Germany) Markus Maier (Germany) Michael Hess | BMW M235i Racing | 130 |
| 68 | Cup2 | 315 | (Germany) Team Mathol Racing e.V. | (United States) Andres Serrano (Germany) Volker Wawer (Germany) Thomas Heinrich (Australia) Angus Chapel | BMW M235i Racing | 129 |
| 69 | SP3 | 150 | (United Arab Emirates) Roadrunner Racing | (Germany) Lutz Marc Rühl (Germany) Thomas D. Hetzer (Switzerland) Boris Hrubesch (United Arab Emirates) Nadir Nabih Zuhour | Renault Clio Cup | 129 |
| 70 | **SP5** | **103** | **(Germany) MSC-Rhön e.V. i. ADAC** | **(Germany) Harald Rettich (Austria) Richard Purtscher (France) Fabrice Reicher (France) Dominque Nury** | **BMW M3** | **128** |
| 71 | **SP2T** | **131** | **(South Korea) Hyundai Motor Deutschland** | **(Germany) Markus Schrick (Germany) Michael Bohrer (Finland) Rory Penttinen (Germany) Guido Naumann** | **Hyundai Veloster** | **128** |
| 72 | SP6 | 78 | (Switzerland) Hofor-Racing | (Switzerland) Martin Kroll (Switzerland) Chantal Kroll (Switzerland) Michael Kroll (Switzerland) Roland Eggimann | BMW M3 GTR | 128 |
| 73 | Cup1 | 257 | (Austria) DMC Dürener Motorsport e.V. | (Germany) Benjamin Weidner (Germany) Dietmar Henke (Germany) Stefan Michels (Germany) Uwe Stein | Opel Astra OPC Cup | 126 |
| 74 | V6 | 165 | (Hungary) Walter, Csaba | (Hungary) Csaba Walter (Hungary) Adrienn Walterné Dancsó (Hungary) Tamás Kovács (Hungary) Frederic Ledoux | BMW M3 | 126 |
| 75 | **V3** | **191** | **(Switzerland) Toyota Swiss Racing Team** | **(Switzerland) Roland Schmid (Switzerland) Roger Vögeli (Switzerland) Olivier Burri (Switzerland) Werner Schmid** | **Toyota GT86** | **126** |
| 76 | SP3 | 144 | (Germany) Kissling Motorsport | (Germany) Olaf Beckmann (Germany) Volker Strycek (Germany) Peter Hass (Germany) Jürgen Schulten | Opel Manta (Flying Fox) GT | 126 |
| 77 | Cup2 | 309 | (Germany) Adrenalin-Motorsport | (Germany) Guido Wirtz (Germany) Christopher Rink (Germany) Oleg Kvitka (Germany) Thorsten Wolter | BMW M235i Racing | 125 |
| 78 | SP10 GT4 | 89 | (Russia) Lukovnikov, Dmitriy | (Russia) Dmitriy Lukovnikov (Germany) Andrei Sidorenko (Germany) Michael Czyborra (Germany) Michael Heimrich | Aston Martin Vantage V8 GT4 | 125 |
| 79 | V3 | 192 | (Switzerland) Toyota Swiss Racing Team | (Switzerland) Christoph Wüest (Switzerland) René Lüthi (Switzerland) Christoph Lötscher (Switzerland) Mark Benz | Toyota GT86 | 124 |
| 80 | SP3 | 147 | (Germany) MSC Sinzig e.V. im ADAC | (Germany) Rolf Weißenfels (Germany) Dietmar Hanitzsch (Germany) Stephan Reuter | Renault Clio 3 | 124 |
| 81 | V3 | 189 | (Germany) Giesbrecht, Mark | (Germany) Mark Giesbrecht (Germany) Frank Kuhlmann (Germany) Frank Neugebauer (Germany) Michael Eichhorn | Honda Civic Type R | 124 |
| 82 | V4 | 190 | (Germany) Sorg Rennsport | (Estonia) Peep Pihotalo (Estonia) Erki Koldits (Estonia) Roul Liidemann | BMW 325 | 123 |
| 83 | V3 | 208 | (Germany) Dörr Motorsport GmbH | (Germany) Philipp Göschel (Germany) Rolf Scheibner (Germany) Frank Weishar | Toyota TMG GT86 Cup | 122 |
| 84 | **AT** | **158** | **(Netherlands) Red Camel - Jordans.nl** | **(Netherlands) Ivo Breukers (Netherlands) Henk Thijssen (Netherlands) Sjaco Griffioen** | **Seat Leon** | **122** |
| 85 | SP2T | 133 | (Germany) Zensen, Ralf | (Germany) Ralf Zensen (Germany) Lothar Wilms (Germany) Jürgen Bretschneider (Germany) Christopher Peters | BMW Mini JCW | 122 |
| 86 | V3 | 199 | (Germany) Dörr Motorsport GmbH | (Poland) Maciej Dreszer (Germany) Arne Hoffmeister (Germany) Florian Wolf (Germany) Fabian Wrabetz | Toyota TMG GT86 Cup | 122 |
| 87 | V4 | 180 | (Germany) "NexD e.K." | (Germany) "NexD e.K." (Germany) Matthias Trinius (Germany) Petra Baecker (Germany) Alexander Huber | BMW 325i E90 | 121 |
| 88 | V5 | 182 | (Germany) Adrenalin-Motorsport | (Germany) Raphael Klingmann (Germany) Jens Dahl (United States) James Chambers (Denmark) Claus Grønning | BMW Z4 3.0si | 120 |
| 89 | Cup1 | 253 | (Germany) Hackländer, Max | (Germany) Max Hackländer (Germany) Christian Gebhardt (Luxembourg) Daniel Bohr (Germany) Pierre Humbert | Opel Astra OPC Cup | 120 |
| 90 | V3 | 202 | (Belgium) Royal Auto-Moto-Club Sankt Vith | (Belgium) Olivier Muytjens (Belgium) "Brody" (Italy) Bruno Barbaro (Belgium) Kurt Dujardyn | Toyota GT86 | 119 |
| 91 | AT | 211 | (Germany) Hanisch, Thomas | (Germany) Thomas Hanisch (Germany) Michael Kühne (Germany) Michael Eichhorn (Germany) Ralph-Peter Rink | Audi A4 quattro | 119 |
| 92 | V4 | 187 | (Germany) Bonk Motorsport | (Japan) Ryu Seya (Japan) Yosuke Shimojima (New Zealand) Guy Stewart (Germany) Jürgen Meyer | BMW 325i | 119 |
| 93 | V3 | 207 | (Germany) Dörr Motorsport GmbH | (Italy) Francesco Fanari (Germany) Dirk Heldmann (Germany) Stefan Kenntemich (Germany) Thomas Kroher | Toyota TMG GT86 Cup | 117 |
| 94 | SP8 | 70 | (United Kingdom) Aston Martin Test Centre | (United Kingdom) Ulrich Bez (Germany) Wolfgang Schuhbauer (Australia) Mal Rose (Australia) Peter Leemhuis | Aston Martin Vantage V8 | 117 |
| 95 | SP7 | 68 | (Sweden) Dunkhols, Christian | (Sweden) Christian Dunkhols (Sweden) Kjell Dunkhols (Sweden) Peter Dunkhols (Sweden) Patrik Skoog | Porsche 997 Cup | 116 |
| 96 | SP7 | 71 | (Germany) Kremer Racing | (Germany) Eberhard Baunach (Germany) Wolfgang Kaufmann (Germany) Edgar Salewsky (Germany) David Schiwietz | Porsche 997 GT3 KR | 115 |
| 97 | V4 | 188 | (Germany) MSC Konz e.V. i. ADAC | (Germany) Alexander Herrmann (Germany) Achim Herrmann (Germany) Victor Smolski (Germany) Thomas Dräger | BMW B46 L | 115 |
| 98 | Cup1 | 256 | (Germany) Team Mathol Racing e.V. | (Germany) Raphael Hundeborn (Germany) Stephan Kuhs (Russia) Artur Goroyan (Germany) Bernhard Henzel | Opel Astra OPC Cup | 115 |
| 99 | V6 | 171 | (Germany) Team Mathol Racing e.V. | (Switzerland) Sebastian Schäfer (Switzerland) Rüdiger Schicht (Germany) Christian Eichner (Switzerland) Michael Imholz | Porsche Cayman R | 115 |
| 100 | **V2T** | **206** | **(Germany) Lammering, Ralf** | **(Germany) Ralf Lammering (Germany) Thomas Rehlinger (Germany) Michael Lachmayer (Germany) Robert Schröder** | **Opel Astra OPC** | **113** |
| 101 | SP3 | 146 | (Germany) AC 1927 Mayen e.V. i. ADAC | (Germany) Jürgen Freiburg (Germany) Sebastian Durik (Germany) André Benninghofen (Switzerland) Marc Jaussi | Volkswagen Golf 3 GTI | 113 |
| 102 | V3 | 198 | (Germany) Lennackers, Thomas | (Germany) Thomas Lennackers (Germany) Christoph Brune (Switzerland) Amanda Hennessy (Switzerland) Robert Dubler | Opel Astra OPC | 111 |
| 103 | SP6 | 82 | (Argentina) Balbiani, Jose Manuel | (Argentina) Jose Manuel Balbiani (Argentina) Stefano Cambria (Argentina) Juan Angel Cusano (United States) David Quinlan | BMW M3 E46 | 110 |
| 104 | V3 | 196 | (Germany) Kratz, Torsten | (Germany) Torsten Kratz (United Kingdom) Meyrick Cox (Netherlands) Einar Thorsen (Germany) Danny Brink | Renault Clio 3 RS | 109 |
| 105 | V6 | 160 | (Germany) Black Falcon Team TMD Friction | (Germany) Markus Enzinger (Germany) Christian Reiter (Germany) Jean-Louis Hertenstein (Germany) Panagiotis Spiliopoulos | Porsche Cayman S | 108 |
| 106 | SP3 | 145 | (Mexico) Lamadrid Jr., Xavier | (Mexico) Xavier Lamadrid Jr. (Mexico) Xavier Lamadrid Sr. (United Kingdom) Massimiliano Girardo (Switzerland) Nicolas Abril | Renault Clio RS | 107 |
| 107 | SP4T | 109 | (Germany) Wölflick, Stephan | (Germany) Stephan Wölflick (Germany) Jürgen Gagstatter (Germany) Urs Bressan | Ford Focus | 102 |
| 108 | Cup1 | 251 | (Germany) Lubner Event & Motorsport | (Germany) Axel Jahn (Germany) Marcel Hartl (Luxembourg) Alainf Pier (United States) Matthew McFadden | Opel Astra OPC Cup | 100 |
| 109 | SP3 | 194 | Toyota Team Thailand | (Thailand) Suttipong Smittachartch (Thailand) Nattavude Charoensukhawatana (Thailand) Nattapong Hortongkam (Thailand) Sak Nana | Toyota Corolla Altis | 99 |
| 110 | SP2T | 132 | (Switzerland) Lanza Motorsport S.c.r.l. | (Switzerland) Simone Barin (Switzerland) Roberto Barin (Italy) Mauro Simoncini | Ford Fiesta ST | 94 |
| NC | SP9 GT3 | 23 | (Germany) Rowe Racing | (Germany) Klaus Graf (Germany) Jan Seyffarth (Germany) Thomas Jäger (Sweden) Richard Göransson | Mercedes-Benz SLS AMG GT3 | 147 |
| NC | SP10 GT4 | 94 | (Germany) Team Mathol Racing e.V. | (Germany) Wolfgang Weber (Germany) Norbert Bermes (Germany) Uwe Nittel (Australia) Robert Thomson | Aston Martin Vantage V8 GT4 | 124 |
| NC | SP3 | 153 | (United Arab Emirates) Roadrunner Racing | (Japan) Junichi Umemoto (Japan) Kouichi Okumura (Germany) Jürgen Peter (Hong Kong) Angus William Thomas Kirkwood | Renault Clio Cup | 122 |
| NC | SP9 GT3 | 8 | (Germany) Haribo Racing Team | (Austria) Norbert Siedler (Germany) Jörg Bergmeister (Germany) Mike Stursberg (Germany) Hans Guido Riegel | Porsche 911 GT3 R | 117 |
| NC | V5 | 183 | (Germany) Adrenalin-Motorsport | (Denmark) Niels Borum (New Zealand) Maurice O'Reilly (New Zealand) Michael Eden | BMW E36 M3 | 117 |
| NC | SP9 GT3 | 9 | (Germany) Prosperia C. Abt Racing GmbH | (Denmark) Nicki Thiim (Germany) Marco Seefried (United Kingdom) Richard Westbrook (Netherlands) Alex Müller | Audi R8 LMS ultra | 114 |
| NC | SP9 GT3 | 27 | (Germany) Walkenhorst Motorsport powered by Dunlop | (Germany) Ralf Oeverhaus (Germany) Henry Walkenhorst (Germany) Stefan Aust (Germany) Peter Posavac | BMW Z4 GT3 | 113 |
| NC | SP9 GT3 | 17 | (Russia) G-Drive Racing | (Russia) Roman Rusinov (Monaco) Stéphane Ortelli (Sweden) Edward Sandström (Switzerland) Nico Müller | Audi R8 LMS ultra | 113 |
| NC | V3 | 197 | (Germany) Richter, Lutz | (Germany) Lutz Richter (Austria) Armin Schwarz (Germany) Rainer Bastuck (Germany) Ingo Bender | Subaru BRZ | 112 |
| NC | SP10 GT4 | 95 | (Australia) STADAvita Racing Team | (Germany) Scott Preacher (Germany) Hendrik Still (Germany) Oliver Louisoder (Germany) Markus Lungstrass | Aston Martin Vantage V8 GT4 | 96 |
| NC | SP-PRO | 11 | (Germany) Wochenspiegel Team Manthey | (Germany) Georg Weiss (Germany) Oliver Kainz (Germany) Michael Jacobs (Germany) Jochen Krumbach | Porsche 911 GT3 RSR | 92 |
| NC | SP3T | 116 | (Germany) MSC Sinzig e.V.i. ADAC | (Germany) Rudi Speich (Germany) Roland Waschkau (Germany) Klaus Hormes | Audi TT | 88 |
| NC | SP9 GT3 | 29 | (Germany) GT Corse by Rinaldi | (Germany) Alexander Mattschull (France) Andrea Barlesi (Germany) Pierre Ehret (Germany) Mike Jäger | Ferrari F458 Italia GT3 | 86 |
| NC | V4 | 185 | (Germany) Mönch, Michael | (Germany) Michael Mönch (Germany) Oliver Frisse (Belgium) Bruno Beulen (South Korea) Jang Han Choi | BMW 325i E90 | 85 |
| NC | SP3 | 148 | Transit Engineering Japan | (Japan) Yamashita Junichiro (Japan) Seki Yutaka (Japan) Oi Takashi | Honda S2000 | 84 |
| NC | SP8 | 50 | (South Korea) Hyundai Motor Deutschland | (Germany) Peter Schumann (Germany) Joachim Kiesch (Germany) Alexander Köppen (Luxembourg) Brice Bosi | Hyundai Genesis V6 | 83 |
| NC | SP3T | 121 | (France) Salini, Philippe | (France) Philippe Salini (France) Stephane Salini (France) Tristan Gommendy | Seat Leon Supercopa | 79 |
| NC | SP4T | 108 | (United States) Rotek Racing GmbH | (United Kingdom) Rob Huff (United States) Robb Holland (Hong Kong) Darryl O'Young (United States) Kevin Gleason | Audi TT RS | 72 |
| NC | SP9 GT3 | 14 | (Germany) Black Falcon | (Saudi Arabia) Abdulaziz Bin Turki Al Faisal (Germany) Hubert Haupt (United Kingdom) Adam Christodoulou (Netherlands) Yelmer Buurman | Mercedes-Benz SLS AMG GT3 | 72 |
| NC | SP10 GT4 | 90 | (Germany) Team Securtal Sorg Rennsport | (United Kingdom) Paul Follett (Germany) Thomas Müller (Germany) Philipp Leisen (Denmark) Anders Fjordbach | BMW M3 GT4 | 71 |
| NC | SP3T | 205 | (Germany) mathilda racing - Team pistenkids | (Germany) Michael Paatz (Germany) Klaus Niedzwiedz (Germany) Jörg Viebahn (Germany) Wolfgang Haugg | Volkswagen Scirocco GT-24 | 70 |
| NC | V6 | 162 | (Germany) Prosport-Performance GmbH | (United Kingdom) Georg Richardson (United States) Charlie Putman (United States) Charles Espenlaub (United States) Shelby Blackstock | Porsche 991 | 70 |
| NC | SP3T | 122 | (Germany) Prill, Patrick | (Germany) Patrick Prill (Germany) Jens Ludmann (Germany) Roland Christoph (Germany) Thorsten Held | Ford Focus | 67 |
| NC | SP9 GT3 | 69 | (Germany) Dörr Motorsport GmbH | (Germany) Rudi Adams (Germany) Sebastian Asch (Portugal) Álvaro Parente (Germany) Arno Klasen | McLaren MP4-12C GT3 | 64 |
| NC | SP7 | 33 | (Germany) Kurt Ecke Motorsport | (Germany) Peter König (Germany) Andreas Sczepansky (Germany) Steffen Schlichenmeier (Germany) Kurt Ecke | Porsche 997 GT3 Cup | 63 |
| NC | SP9 GT3 | 25 | (Belgium) BMW Sports Trophy Team Marc VDS | (Belgium) Maxime Martin (Germany) Jörg Müller (Germany) Uwe Alzen (Germany) Marco Wittmann | BMW Z4 GT3 | 60 |
| NC | SP9 GT3 | 26 | (Belgium) BMW Sports Trophy Team Marc VDS | (Belgium) Bas Leinders (Finland) Markus Palttala (Netherlands) Nick Catsburg (Germany) Dirk Adorf | BMW Z4 GT3 | 60 |
| NC | SP4T | 112 | (Germany) pro handicap e.V. | (Germany) Wolfgang Müller (Germany) Walter Nawotka (Monaco) Jutta Kleinschmidt (Spain) Carlos Arimon | Audi TTS | 59 |
| NC | V3 | 201 | (Germany) MSC-Rhön e.V. i. ADAC | (Germany) Reiner Bardenheuer (Germany) Markus Horn (Germany) Felix Horn (Germany) Stephan Epp | Toyota GT86 Cup | 55 |
| NC | Cup2 | 314 | (Germany) Team Securtal Sorg Rennsport | (Germany) Friedhelm Mihm (Germany) Heiko Eichenberg (Germany) René Steurer (Austria) Thomas Jäger | BMW M235i Racing | 54 |
| NC | SP8 | 51 | (Switzerland) Toyota Swiss Racing Team | (Germany) Helmut Baumann (Germany) Horst Baumann (Switzerland) Lorenz Frey (Switzerland) Fredy Barth | Lexus ISF CCS-R | 53 |
| NC | SP9 GT3 | 30 | (United Kingdom) Nissan GT Academy Team RJN | (Germany) Michael Krumm (Japan) Tetsuya Tanaka (Japan) Kazuki Hoshino (Japan) Katsumasa Chiyo | Nissan GT-R GT3 | 51 |
| NC | SP9 GT3 | 66 | (Germany) Dörr Motorsport GmbH | (France) Kévin Estre (Netherlands) Peter Kox (United Kingdom) Tim Mullen (Germany) Sascha Bert | McLaren MP4-12C GT3 | 48 |
| NC | SP7 | 41 | (Germany) Manthey Racing | (Germany) Marco Schelp (Monaco) Marc Gindorf (New Zealand) Peter Scharmach (Germany) Frank Kräling | Porsche 911 GT3 Cup S | 48 |
| NC | SP7 | 74 | (San Marino) GDL Racing | (United States) Vic Rice (United States) Shane Lewis (United Kingdom) Colin White (Russia) Alexey Veremenko | Porsche 991 | 47 |
| NC | SP10 GT4 | 87 | (Germany) Bonk Motorsport | (Germany) Axel Burghardt (Germany) Bernd Kleeschulte (Germany) Jens Moetefindt (Germany) Andreas Möntmann | BMW M3 GT4 | 42 |
| NC | SP9 GT3 | 6 | (Germany) Frikadelli Racing Team | (Germany) Klaus Abbelen (Germany) Sabine Schmitz (Netherlands) Patrick Huisman (France) Patrick Pilet | Porsche GT3-R | 41 |
| NC | AT | 209 | (Germany) Caba, Ralph | (Germany) Ralph Caba (Germany) Oliver Sprungmann (Germany) Volker Lange (Germany) Henning Cramer | Ford Focus RS | 39 |
| NC | V3 | 195 | (United Kingdom) Mazda Motorsports Team Jota | (Japan) Teruaki Kato (Sweden) Stefan Johansson (United Kingdom) Owen Mildenhall (Germany) Wolfgang Kaufmann | Mazda MX-5 | 37 |
| NC | SP3T | 114 | (Germany) AC 1927 Mayen e.V. i. ADAC | (Argentina) Jose Visir (Argentina) Ruben Salerno (Argentina) Jorge Alberto Cersosimo (Argentina) Alejandro Walter Chahwan | Volkswagen Golf 5 GTI | 34 |
| NC | V3 | 200 | (Germany) Dörr Motorsport GmbH | (Germany) Hans-Martin Gass (Germany) Heiko Hahn (Germany) Roland Konrad (Germany) Kristian Vetter | Toyota TMG GT86 Cup | 32 |
| NC | SP6 | 81 | (Germany) MSC-Rhön e.V. i. ADAC | (France) Daniel Dupont (France) Alain Giavedoni (France) Patrick Ancelet | BMW M3 | 32 |
| NC | SP3T | 124 | (Germany) Prof. Wellnitz, Jörg | (Germany) Jörg Wellnitz (Germany) Manfred jun. Krammer (Germany) Johann Wanger (Germany) Thomas Mühlenz | Audi TT KM | 31 |
| NC | SP7 | 75 | (Germany) Clickvers.de Team | (Germany) Kersten Jodexnis (Germany) Wolfgang Destreé (Germany) Eddy Althoff (Germany) Norbert Pauels | Porsche 997 GT3 | 31 |
| NC | SP9 GT3 | 19 | (Germany) BMW Sports Trophy Team Schubert | (Germany) Dirk Werner (Germany) Dirk Müller (Germany) Lucas Luhr (United Kingdom) Alexander Sims | BMW Z4 GT3 | 20 |
| NC | SP7 | 73 | (Germany) Car Collection Motorsport | (Germany) Johannes Kirchhoff (Germany) Wolfgang Kemper (Germany) Gustav Edelhoff (Germany) Elmar Grimm | Porsche 997 GT3 Cup | 13 |
| NC | SP8 | 52 | (Japan) Gazoo Racing | (Japan) Yoshinobu Katsumata (Japan) Minoru Takaki | Lexus IS F | 11 |
| NC | SP9 GT3 | 3 | (Germany) Phoenix Racing | (Germany) Marc Basseng (Switzerland) Marcel Fässler (Germany) Frank Stippler (Belgium) Laurens Vanthoor | Audi R8 LMS ultra | 8 |
| NC | Cup2 | 302 | (Germany) Team Scheid-Partl Motorsport | (Germany) Harald Grohs (Germany) Jörg Weidinger (Germany) Maximilian Partl | BMW M235i Racing | 8 |
| NC | SP5 | 107 | (Germany) Rehs, Patrick | (Germany) Patrick Rehs (Germany) Sascha Rehs (Germany) Konstantin Wolf (Germany) Jörg Kurowski | BMW 130i GTR | 7 |
| NC | SP3 | 152 | (United Arab Emirates) Roadrunner Racing | (Germany) Volker Kühn (Germany) Joachim Steidel (United Kingdom) Hugh Buckley (Italy) Ugo Vicenzi | Renault Clio Cup | 7 |
| NC | SP9 GT3 | 31 | (Germany) Car Collection Motorsport | (Germany) Peter Schmidt (Germany) Christian Bracke (Germany) Heinz Schmersal (Austria) Horst Felbermayr Jr. | Mercedes-Benz SLS AMG GT3 | 3 |
| NC | SP2T | 134 | (Switzerland) Besaplast Racing Team | (Croatia) Franjo Kovac (Germany) Henry Littig (Germany) Thomas Tekaat (Germany) Kai Jordan | Mini Cooper S | 3 |
| NC | AT | 210 | (Germany) Dittmann, Titus | (Germany) Titus Dittmann (Germany) Bernd Albrecht (Germany) Reinhard Schall (Germany) Oliver Dutt | Chrysler (Dodge) Viper | 3 |
| NC | Cup2 | 303 | (Finland) Österlund, Henri | (Finland) Henri Österlund (Finland) Markku Honkanen (Finland) Christer Lybäck (Finland) Matias Henkola | BMW M235i Racing | 3 |

== Bibliography ==
- Jörg-Richard Ufer & Tim Upietz. 24 Stunden Nürburgring Nordschleife 2014. Gruppe C Motorsport Verlag. ISBN 978-3-928540-75-9.
