= Rory Penttinen =

Finnish racing driver (born 1979)

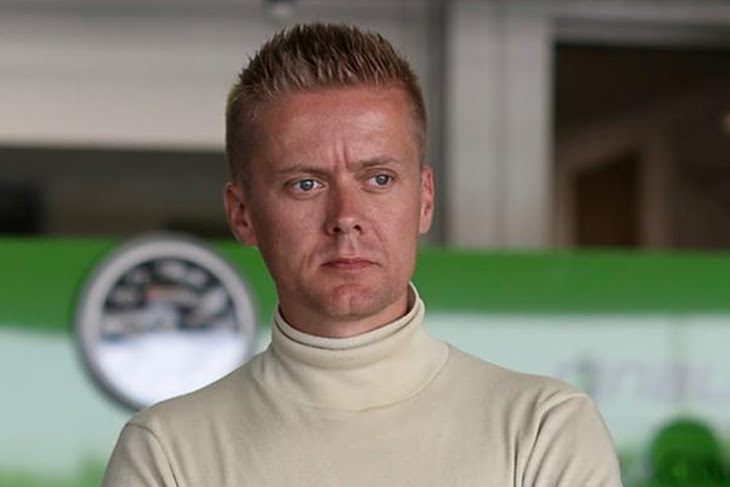
- Nationality: (Finland) Finnish
- Born: Rory Sebastian Penttinen; 30 October 1979 (age 47) Nykarleby, Finland

Le Mans Prototype career
- Current team: Graff Racing
- Categorisation: FIA Bronze (2017–2021, 2027–); FIA Silver (2022–2026)
- Car number: 9
- Former teams: GDL-racing; Hunday Germany; Rinaldi Racing; Kessel Racing; United Autosports
- Starts: 88
- Wins: 5
- Best finish: 1st in 2007 - 2021

Previous series
- GT3 Series

Rory Sebastian Penttinen (born 30 October 1979) is a Finnish racing driver born in Nykarleby, Finland who in 2021 drives in the Asian Le Mans Series with United Autosports and European Le Mans Series with Graff Racing.

== Racing career ==
Penttinen's international career started in 2007 when he won the world championship in the Legends series finals in California USA. Since that he has raced different car types in several different series. Among other highlights in his career is the victory at the Nurburgring 24H race 2014 with Hyundai Germany and the Dubai 24H victory in 2017 in a Lamborghini Huracan with GDL-racing.

Penttinen is known for being a fast and reliable endurance driver, he has the ability to learn new cars and tracks in a short time and performs best when he is put under pressure. When Penttinen in June 2017 applied for a FIA bronze license, and made a debut in the Blancpain GT SERIES in a Ferrari 488 GT3 with Rinaldi racing, he finished third in class in the race.

From 2017 to 2019, Penttinen mainly raced GT3 cars (Ferrari 488 GT) with Rinaldi Racing and Kessel Racing but also did some other endurance races such as 25H VW FunCup in a Beetle and N24 with GDL Motorsport.

=== Racing highlights ===
Year	Place	Series / Race
2021	1st	Asian Le Mans Series - LMP3
2015	3rd	ADAC Zurich 24 Hours of Nürburgring SP2T class
2007	2nd	Legends Trophy Finland
2007	1st	Legends Car World Finals - Pro

=== Season 2020 ===
In 2020, Penttinen raced for Graff Racing in the Michelin Le Mans Cup. His teammate was Matthias Kaiser.

In the seasons first race at Paul Ricard, in July, Penttinen and Kaiser finished 3rd.

In the second race, at Spa-Francorchamps, car #26 finished 5th.

In the third round, that was moved from Spain to France (due to COVID-19) and held the 29th of August at Paul Ricard the Graff duo Penttinen and Kaiser did a phenomenal job. In the qualification, Penttinen took the podium and he also led the race for 26 laps. Their final results from Paul Ricard was second and after the race they are now second in the series.

Before the final race in Portimao, the duo was in fourth place in the fight for the championship. In theory it was possible to end the season on the podium and in the race both drivers did a great job behind the wheel and they crossed the finish line as P1, unfortunately they got a time penalty and the final result was P7. Despite this mistake they were P3 overall.

=== Season 2021 ===
Started in February 2021, Penttinen was then racing in the Asian Le Mans Series in Dubai and Abu Dhabi for the British team United Autosports. Driving the LMP3 car #23 together with Wayne Boyd and Manuel Maldonado.

Also in 2021 Penttinen is driving for the French team Graff Racing in the full 6 races European Le Mans Series together with Matthias Kaiser in LMP3 car #9.

== Racing Record ==
=== Career Summary ===
Year	Series	Team	Races	Wins	Poles	Podiums	Points	Position
2004	Legends Trophy Finland	N/A	?	?	?	?	106	9th
2005	Legends Trophy Finland	N/A	?	?	?	?	423	8th
2006	Legends Trophy Finland	N/A	14	?	?	?	1207	5th
2007	Legends Trophy Finland	N/A	?	?	?	?	?	2nd
2007	Legends Car World Finals - Pro (USA)	N/A	1	1	0	1	N/A	1st
2008	Radical Sweden - RM	JFG Motorsport	12	0	0	3	34	7th
2009	Radical Sweden - RM	N/A	2	0	0	0	N/A	22nd
2010	Legends Trophy Finland	N/A	13	0	1	1	968	10th
2011	Legends Trophy Finland - Pro	N/A	2	0	0	0	88	23rd
2011	Radical Sweden - RM	JFG Motorsport	7	0	0	0	79	13th
2012	Radical Sweden - RM	JFG Motorsport	6	0	1	3	103	1st
2014	24 Hours of Nürburgring - SP2T	Hyundai Motor Deutschland	1	1	?	1	N/A	1st
2015	24 Hours of Nürburgring - SP2T	Hyundai Motor Deutschland	1	0	0	1	N/A	3rd
2016	Touring Car Endurance Series - A3	Brunswick						
2016	24H Series - A3	Brunswick						
2016	24H Series - 991	GDL Racing						
2016	24H Series - SP2	GDL Racing						
2016	24 Hours of Nürburgring - SP3T	Hyundai Motor Deutschland	1	0	0	0	N/A	4th
2017	Blancpain GT Series Endurance Cup - Am	Rinaldi Racing	1	0	0	1	20	14th
2017	24H Series - SPX	GDL Racing Middle East	1	1	0	1	29	NC
2018	Blancpain GT Series Endurance Cup - Am	Rinaldi Racing	5	0	0	1	59	9th
2018	24H GT Series - SPX	GDL Racing Middle East	1	0	0	0	0	NC
2019	The Hankook 25 Hours VW Fun Cup	GDL Team Spain	1	0	0	0	0	89th
2019	Intercontinental GT Challenge	Rinaldi Racing	1	0	0	0	0	NC
2019	Blancpain GT Series Endurance Cup - Am	Rinaldi Racing	2	0	0	0	31	15th
2019	24H GT Series - A6	Rinaldi Racing	2	0	0	0	16	20th
2019	24H TCE Series - TCR	GDL Racing	2	0	0	0	8	NC
2019	TCR Spa 500	GDL Team Australia	1	0	0	0	N/A	11th
2019	24 Hours of Nürburgring - V4	JJ Motorsport	1	0	0	0	N/A	4th
2019-20	Asian Le Mans Series - LMP3	Graff Racing	1	0	0	0	6	13th
2020	Le Mans Cup - LMP3	Graff Racing	7	0	1	3	70.5	4th
2021	Asian Le Mans Series - LMP3	United Autosports	4	3	3	3	77	1st
2021	European Le Mans Series - LMP3	Graff Racing	6	0	0	1	24.5	14th
2021	Le Mans Cup - GT3	Iron Lynx	2	1	1	2	25	12th
2022	Asian Le Mans Series - GT	Bilstein Haupt Racing Team	4	0	0	0	16	9th
2022	Prototype Cup Germany	MRS GT-Racing	2	0	0	2	0	NC
