= 2015 24 Hours of Nürburgring =

Endurance motor race in Germany

Nürburgring 24h track (Nordschleife+GP Circuit without Mercedes-Arena)

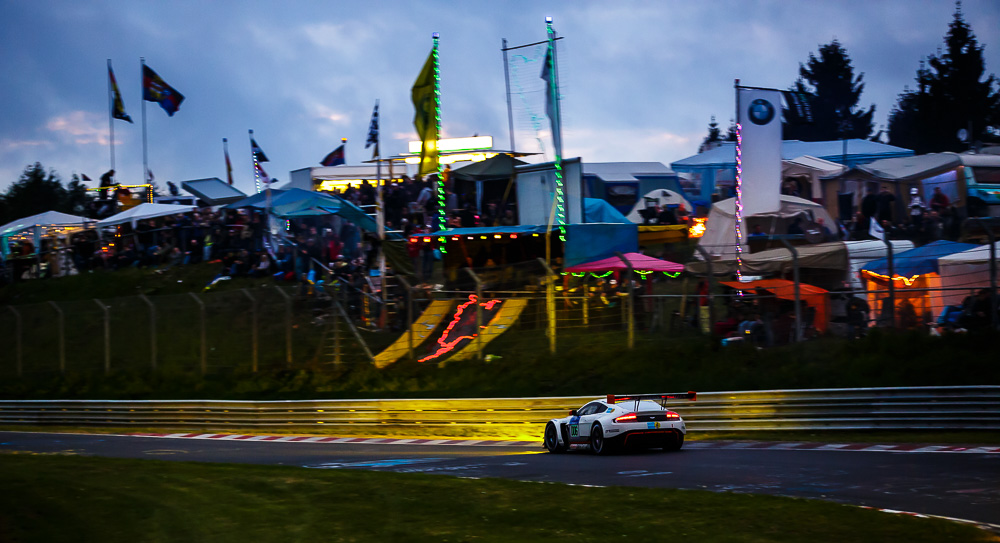
Racing at night at Hatzenbach/Hocheichen

The 2015 ADAC Zurich 24 Hours of Nürburgring was the 43rd running of the 24 Hours of Nürburgring. It took place over 14–17 May 2015.

The #28 Audi Sport Team WRT won the race on an Audi R8 LMS.

== Race results ==
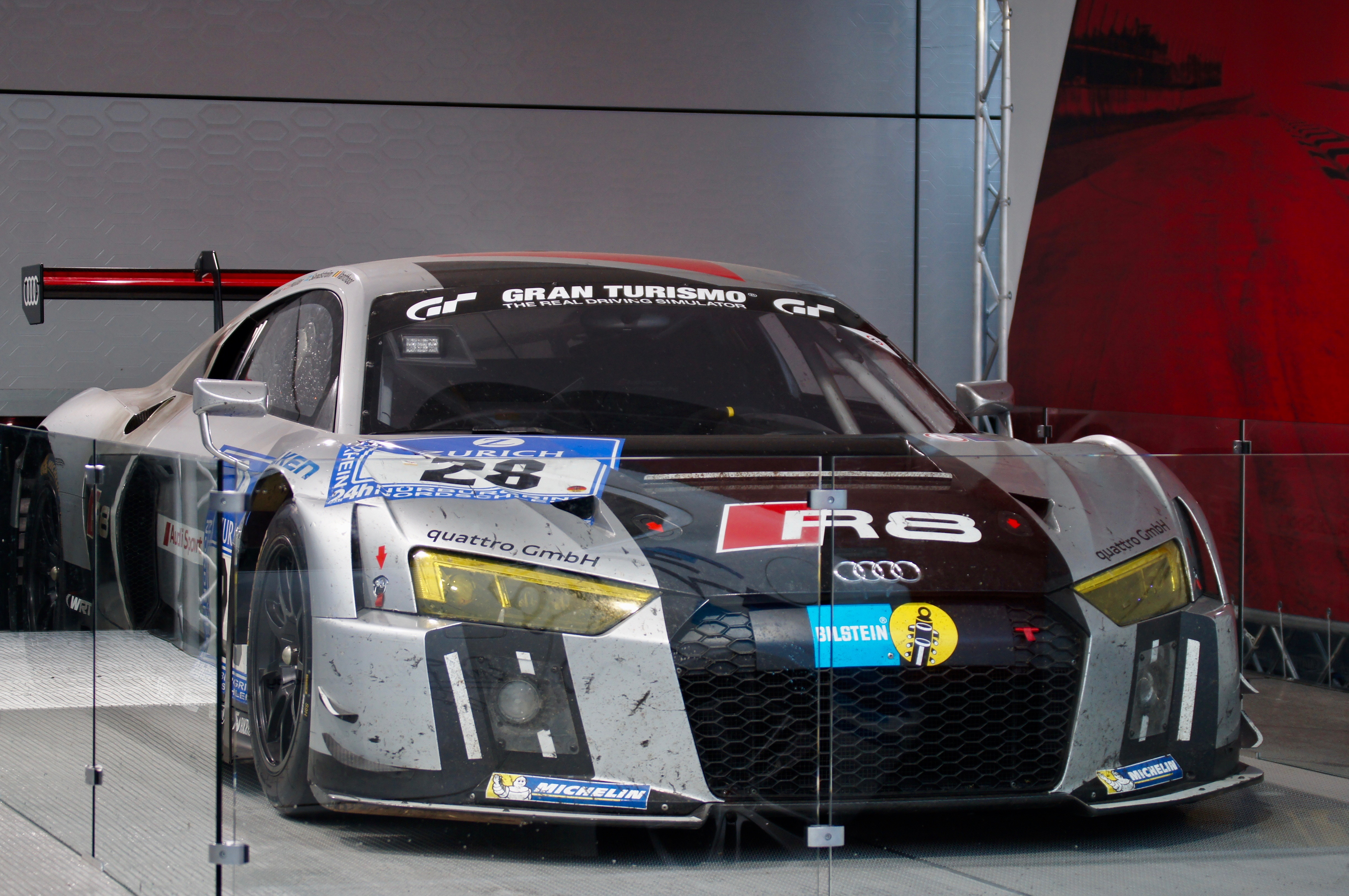
The race winning #28 Audi R8 LMS from Audi Sport Team WRT.

Class winners in bold.

Pos	Class	No.	Team	Drivers	Vehicle	Laps
1	**SP9 GT3**	**28**	**(Belgium) Audi Sport Team WRT**	**(Germany) Christopher Mies (Sweden) Edward Sandström (Switzerland) Nico Müller (Belgium) Laurens Vanthoor**	**Audi R8 LMS**	**156**
2	SP9 GT3	25	(Belgium) BMW Sports Trophy Team Marc VDS	(Belgium) Maxime Martin (Germany) Lucas Luhr (Finland) Markus Palttala (United Kingdom) Richard Westbrook	BMW Z4 GT3	156
3	SP9 GT3	44	(Germany) Falken Motorsports	(United Kingdom) Peter Dumbreck (Germany) Wolf Henzler (Austria) Martin Ragginger (Switzerland) Alexandre Imperatori	Porsche 997 GT3 R	155
4	SP9 GT3	26	(Belgium) BMW Sports Trophy Team Marc VDS	(Brazil) Augusto Farfus (Germany) Jörg Müller (Netherlands) Nick Catsburg (Germany) Dirk Adorf	BMW Z4 GT3	155
5	SP9 GT3	5	(Germany) Black Falcon	(Saudi Arabia) Abdulaziz Bin Turki Al Faisal (Germany) Hubert Haupt (Netherlands) Yelmer Buurman (Netherlands) Jaap van Lagen	Mercedes-Benz SLS AMG GT3	155
6	SP9 GT3	17	(Germany) Walkenhorst Motorsport	(Germany) Felipe Fernández Laser (Italy) Michela Cerruti (United States) John Edwards (Germany) Daniel Keilwitz	BMW Z4 GT3	153
7	SP9 GT3	29	(Belgium) Audi Sport Team WRT	(Denmark) Nicki Thiim (Germany) Christer Jöns (Germany) Pierre Kaffer (Belgium) Laurens Vanthoor	Audi R8 LMS	153
8	SP9 GT3	11	(Germany) Bentley Team HTP	(Switzerland) Harold Primat (Germany) Christopher Brück (Austria) Clemens Schmid (Germany) Marco Seefried	Bentley Continental GT3	151
9	SP9 GT3	35	(United Kingdom) Nissan GT Academy Team RJN	(United Kingdom) Alex Buncombe (Japan) Kazuki Hoshino (Germany) Michael Krumm (Spain) Lucas Ordonez	Nissan GT-R GT3	151
10	SP9 GT3	33	(Germany) Team Premio	(Germany) Kenneth Heyer (Switzerland) Philipp Frommenwiler (United Kingdom) Robert Huff (Norway) Christian Krognes	Mercedes-Benz SLS AMG GT3	151
11	SP9 GT3	16	(Germany) Twin Busch Motorsport GmbH	(Germany) Dennis Busch (Germany) Marc Busch (Netherlands) Christiaan Frankenhout	Audi R8 LMS ultra	149
12	SP9 GT3	15	(Hong Kong) Audi race experience	(Malaysia) Alex Yoong (China) Franky Cheng (Hong Kong) Marchy Lee (Hong Kong) Shaun Thong	Audi R8 LMS ultra	148
13	**SP7**	**61**	**(Germany) Black Falcon Team TMD Friction**	**(Germany) "Gerwin" (Germany) Manuel Metzger (Austria) Philipp Eng (Germany) Hannes Plesse**	**Porsche 911 GT3 Cup**	**148**
14	**SP-Pro**	**53**	**(Japan) Team Toyota Gazoo Racing**	**(Japan) Masahiko Kageyama (Japan) Hiroaki Ishiura (Japan) Kazuya Oshima (Japan) Takato Iguchi**	**Lexus LFA Code X**	**147**
15	SP9 GT3	18	(Germany) Walkenhorst Motorsport	(Germany) Henry Walkenhorst (Germany) Ralf Oeverhaus (Germany) Christian Bollrath (Germany) Stefan Aust	BMW Z4 GT3	146
16	SP9 GT3	007	(United Kingdom) Aston Martin Racing	(Germany) Stefan Mücke (United Kingdom) Darren Turner (Portugal) Pedro Lamy (New Zealand) Richie Stanaway	Aston Martin V12 Vantage GT3	146
17	SP9 GT3	12	(Germany) Manthey Racing	(Germany) Otto Klohs (Germany) Robert Renauer (Germany) Harald Schlotter (Germany) Jens Richter	Porsche 991 GT3 R	145
18	**SP3T**	**114**	**(Japan) Subaru Tecnica International**	**(Netherlands) Carlo van Dam (Germany) Marcel Lasée (Germany) Tim Schrick (Japan) Hideki Yamauchi**	**Subaru WRX STi**	**143**
19	SP7	68	(Germany) Frikadelli Racing Team	(Germany) Frank Kräling (Monaco) Marc Gindorf (United States) Connor De Phillippi (Germany) Klaus Abbelen	Porsche GT Cup America	143
20	SP7	70	(Germany) raceunion Teichmann Racing	(Germany) "Autumn" (Germany) Marc Hennerici (Germany) Danny Brinkmann (Germany) "Don Stephano"	Porsche 997 GT3 Cup	142
21	SP7	75	(Germany) GetSpeed Performance	(Germany) Adam Osieka (Germany) Dieter Schornstein (Germany) "Andy Sammers" (United States) Dennis Trebing	Porsche 991 GT3 Cup	141
22	SP7	57		(United Kingdom) Willie Moore (United Kingdom) Bill Cameron (Germany) Peter Bonk	Porsche 991 Carrera Cup	141
23	SP7	91	(Germany) Manthey Racing	(Germany) "Dieter Schmidtmann" (Germany) Andreas Ziegler (Germany) Marco Schelp (New Zealand) Peter Scharmach	Porsche 911 GT3 Cup MR	140
24	SP7	64		(Germany) Reinhard Huber (Italy) Gianvito Rossi (Liechtenstein) Michael Hagen (Germany) Christoph Rendlen	Porsche 997 Cup	138
25	**Cup 5**	**301**	**(Germany) Team Securtal Sorg Rennsport**	**(Germany) Michele Di Martino (Germany) Moritz Oberheim (Germany) Kevin Warum (Germany) Torsten Kratz**	**BMW M235i Racing**	**136**
26	**V6**	**162**	**(Germany) Black Falcon Team TMD Friction**	**(Netherlands) "Philip" (Germany) Andre Kuhn (Germany) Christian Schmitz (Germany) Helmut Weber**	**Porsche 911 Carrera**	**136**
27	SP7	74	(Germany) GetSpeed Performance	(Germany) Ulrich Berg (Liechtenstein) Patrik Kaiser (France) Maxence Maurice (Argentina) Camilo Echevararria	Porsche 997 GT3 Cup	135
28	**SP6**	**81**		**(Germany) Felix Horn (Germany) Markus Horn (Switzerland) Jean Hertenstein (Switzerland) "Takis"**	**Porsche 991**	**135**
29	SP6	80	(Germany) Prosport-Performance GmbH	(Germany) Michael Rebhan (Germany) Dominik Schoning (Argentina) Juan Manuel Silva (Germany) Frank Schmickler	Porsche Cayman	134
30	SP7	66	(Germany) Kurt Ecke Motorsport	(Germany) Sebastian Glaser (Germany) Andreas Sczepansky (Germany) Steffen Schlichenmeier (Germany) Kurt Ecke	Porsche 997 GT3 Cup	134
31	**Cup 1**	**250**	**(Germany) Team Schirmer**	**(Germany) Markus Oestreich (Germany) Moritz Oestreich (Germany) Robin Strycek (Germany) Volker Strycek**	**Opel Astra OPC Cup**	**132**
32	SP7	65		(Germany) Vincent Kolb (United Kingdom) Didier Denat (Germany) Thomas König (Switzerland) Lorenzo Rocco	Porsche 997 Cup	132
33	Cup 5	308	(Germany) Walkenhorst Motorsport	(Germany) Thomas D. Hetzer (Germany) "Thyson" (Finland) Mathias Henkola (Germany) Henning Cramer	BMW M235i Racing	132
34	Cup 5	306	(Germany) Bonk Motorsport	(Germany) Peter Bonk (Thailand) Nana Sak (Germany) Christopher Mies (Switzerland) Roger Kurzen	BMW M235i Racing	132
35	**SP-X**	**9**	**(United States) Scuderia Cameron Glickenhaus**	**(Germany) Manuel Lauck (United Kingdom) Marino Franchitti (Germany) David Jahn (France) Franck Mailleux**	**SCG 003C**	**132**
36	SP3T	116	(Germany) MSC Sinzig e.V. im ADAC	(Germany) Rudi Speich (Germany) Roland Waschkau (Germany) Dirk Vleugels (Germany) Nils Jung	Audi TT	131
37	SP3T	117	(Germany) Scuderia Colonia e.V.	(Germany) Matthias Wasel (Germany) Matthias Wasel (Germany) Marcus Löhnert (Germany) Elmar Deegener	Audi TT RS	131
38	V6	167	(Germany) aesthetic racing	(Germany) Stein Tveten (Germany) Yannick Fubrich (Finland) Niko Nurminen	Porsche 991	131
39	SP3T	187	(Japan) Team Toyota Gazoo Racing	(Japan) Takayuki Kinoshita (Japan) Takamitsu Matsui (Japan) Naoya Gamou (Japan) Kensuke Sato	Lexus RC	131
40	SP7	62	(San Marino) GDL Racing	(Australia) Rob Thomson (Italy) Andrea Perlini (Switzerland) Nicola Bravetti (Germany) Peter Fuchs	Porsche 911 GT3 Cup	131
41	**SP10 GT4**	**87**	**(Germany) Team Mathol Racing e.V.**	**(Germany) Wolfgang Weber (Germany) Norbert Bermes (United Kingdom) Scott Preacher (Germany) Hendrik Still**	**Aston Martin Vantage V8-GT4**	**130**
42	**SP8T**	**235**	**(Germany) Walkenhorst Motorsport**	**(Germany) Bernd Ostmann (Germany) Christian Gebhardt (Sweden) Victor Bouveng (Germany) Harald Grohs**	**BMW M235i Racing**	**130**
43	SP10 GT4	88	(Australia) STADAvita Racing Team	(United Kingdom) Scott Preacher (Australia) Rob Thomson (Australia) Garth Duffy (Germany) Markus Lungstrass	Aston Martin Vantage V8-GT4	129
44	SP-Pro	39	(Germany) Kremer Racing	(Germany) Eberhard Baunach (Germany) Wolfgang Kaufmann (Germany) Maik Rönnefarth (France) Philippe Haezebrouck	Porsche 911 GT3 KR	129
45	**V4**	**185**	**(Germany) Team AutoArenA Motorsport**	**(Germany) Patrick Assenheimer (Germany) Marc Marbach (Germany) Werner Gusenbauer**	**Mercedes-Benz C230**	**128**
46	Cup 1	253	(Germany) Lubner Motorsport	(Luxembourg) Daniel Bohr (Germany) Michael Bruggenkamp (Germany) Schroder (Switzerland) Roger Vogeli	Opel Astra OPC Cup	128
47	Cup 5	310	(Germany) Pixum Team Adrenalin Motorsport	(Norway) Einar Thorsen (Germany) Carsten Ohlinger (United States) Hai Prewitt (Belgium) Andrea Barlesi	BMW M235i Racing	128
48	SP10 GT4	86	(Germany) Team Securtal Sorg Rennsport	(Germany) Frank Elsässer (Germany) Oliver Bender (Germany) Stefan Beyer (United Kingdom) Paul Follett	BMW M3 GT4	128
49	**V5**	**175**	**(Germany) Pixum Team Adrenalin Motorsport**	**(Germany) Christian Bullesbach (Germany) Andreas Schettler (Germany) Timo Hilgert (Germany) Moritz Gusenbauer**	**BMW Z4 3.0si**	**127**
50	V4	188	(Germany) Pixum Team Adrenalin Motorsport	(Germany) Danny Brink (Germany) Stephan Reuter (Germany) Christopher Rink (Germany) Ralph-Peter Rink	BMW E90 325i	127
51	Cup 5	309	(Germany) Pixum Team Adrenalin Motorsport	(Germany) Norbert Fischer (Germany) Christian Konnerth (Germany) Thorsten Wolter (Germany) Christopher Rink	BMW M235i Racing	126
52	**SP3**	**146**	**(Germany) Kissling Motorsport**	**(Germany) Olaf Beckmann (Germany) Volker Strycek (Germany) Peter Hass (Germany) Jürgen Schulten**	**Opel Manta (Flying Fox) GT**	**126**
53	SP3T	118	(Germany) Team Mathol Racing e.V.	(Germany) Jörg Kittelmann (Germany) Klaus-Dieter Müller (Germany) Thomas Heinrich (Armenia) Artur Goroyan	Seat Leon Supercopa	126
54	Cup 1	251		(Germany) Stephan Kuhs (Germany) Bernhard Henzel (Belgium) Jean-Luc Behets (Germany) Ralf Lammering	Opel Astra OPC Cup	125
55	SP3	154		(Japan) Kouichi Okumura (Japan) Teruhiko Hamano (Jordan) Nadir Zuhour (United Arab Emirates) Mohammed Al-Owais	Renault Clio Cup	125
56	**SP8**	**49**	**(United Kingdom) Aston Martin Test Centre**	**(Germany) Ulrich Bez (Switzerland) Andreas Banziger (Australia) Mai Rose (Australia) Peter Leemhuis**	**Aston Martin Vantage V8**	**123**
57	V5	176	(Germany) Team Securtal Sorg Rennsport	(Germany) Lars Jürgen Zander (Germany) René Steurer (Germany) Christian Titze (Germany) Peter Haener	BMW 330i Coupe	122
58	V4	183	(Argentina) Speedworxx Racing	(Argentina) Alessandro Salerno (Argentina) Roberto Falcon (Argentina) Marcos Vazquez (Argentina) Alfredo Tricarichi	BMW 325i	122
59	SP8	54	(Japan) Lexus Racing	(Germany) Helmut Baumann (Germany) Horst Baumann (Switzerland) Lorenz Frey (Switzerland) Fredy Barth	Lexus ISF CCS-R	122
60	V4	184	(Germany) Team Securtal Sorg Rennsport	(Germany) Sascha Friedrich (Germany) Daniel Engl (Germany) Joachim Gunther (Germany) Niklas Meisenzahl	BMW 325i	122
61	Cup 1	254	(Germany) Team Flying Horse	(Germany) Raphael Hundeborn (Germany) Ronja Assmann (Germany) Winfried Assmann (Germany) Kai Riemer	Opel Astra OPC Cup	121
62	V4	190	(Germany) aesthetic racing	(Germany) Heinz-Jürgen Kroner (Germany) Kevin Hönscheid (Germany) Wolfgang Hönscheid (Austria) Michael Fischer	BMW E90 325i	121
63	V4	191		(Germany) Michael Monch (Germany) Jan von Kiedrowski (South Korea) Jang Han Choi (Netherlands) Marco van Ramshorst	BMW E90 325i	121
64	**SP4T**	**112**	**(Germany) Pro handicap. Ev.**	**(Germany) Wolfgang Müller (Germany) Jutta Kleinschmidt (Germany) Sabine Podzus**	**Audi TT**	**121**
65	V5	174	(Germany) Pixum Team Adrenalin Motorsport	(Germany) Anthony Toll (Spain) Carlos Solivellas (Germany) Richard Moers (Bahrain) Jaber Al-Khalifa	BMW Z4 3.0si	120
66	SP4T	110	(Germany) AC 1927 Mayen e.V. im ADAC	(Germany) Stefan Lohn (Germany) Michael Klotz (Argentina) Jose Visir (Germany) Andre Benninghofen	VW Golf 5 R-Line	120
67	SP8T	51	(Germany) Pixum Team Adrenalin Motorsport	(Denmark) Niels Borum (New Zealand) Maurice O'Reilly (New Zealand) Michael Eden (New Zealand) Wayne Moore	BMW E92 335i	120
68	SP3	144		(Mexico) Xavier Lamadrid Jr. (Mexico) Xavier Lamadrid (United Kingdom) Massimiliano Girardo (Spain) Nicolas Abril	Renault Clio RS	119
69	V5	177	(Switzerland) Hofor Racing	(United Kingdom) Simon Glenn (United Kingdom) Jody Halse (United Kingdom) Marcos Burnett	BMW E36 M3	119
70	SP3	150	(Germany) AC 1927 Mayen e.V. im ADAC	(Germany) Benjamin Decius (Germany) Thomas Juhlen (Germany) Sebastian Durik (Germany) Ralph Liesenfeld	VW Golf 3 16V	119
71	**SP2T**	**131**	**(South Korea) Hyundai Motor Deutschland GmbH**	**(Germany) Markus Schrick (Germany) Peter Schumann (Germany) Guido Naumann (Luxembourg) Daniel Bohrer**	**Hyundai i30 Coupe Turbo**	**119**
72	SP9 GT3	85	(United Kingdom) Bentley Motors Ltd.	(United Kingdom) Andy Meyrick (United Kingdom) Guy Smith (United Kingdom) Steven Kane (Germany) Lance David Arnold	Bentley Continental GT3	119
73	V5	182		(United Kingdom) Dale Lomas (Germany) Lucian Gavris (United Kingdom) Bradley Philpot (Norway) Oskar Sandberg	BMW 330i	117
74	SP6	83	(Switzerland) Hofor Racing	(Germany) Bernd Kupper (Switzerland) Martin Kroll (Switzerland) Michael Kroll (Switzerland) Ronny Tobler	BMW M3 CSL	117
75	SP7	73	(Germany) raceunion Teichmann Racing	(Germany) Torleif Nytroen (Norway) Morten Skyer (Finland) Antti Buri (Finland) Kari-Pekka Laaksonen	Porsche 997 Cup	117
76	Cup 5	311	(Germany) Team Mathol Racing e.V.	(Germany) Andre Duve (Ecuador) Andreas Serrano (Germany) Daniel Schwerfeld (Germany) Petra Baecker	BMW M235i Racing	116
77	**AT**	**207**		**(Germany) Thomas Hanisch (Germany) Michael Eichhorn (Finland) Markku Honkanen (Germany) Michael Kühne**	**Audi A4 quattro**	**114**
78	SP3	143	(Germany) MSC Sinzig e.V. im ADAC	(Germany) Rolf Weißenfels (Germany) Dietmar Hanitzsch (Germany) "Engel" (Germany) "Bengel"	Renault Clio	113
79	Cup 5	303	(Austria) Team Scheid-Honert Motorsport	(Germany) Michael Schrey (Germany) Max Partl (Germany) Uwe Ebertz (Germany) Jörg Weidinger	BMW M235i Racing	113
80	SP3T	119		(Germany) Patrick Prill (Germany) Marcelger Willert (Germany) Jens Ludmann (Germany) Daniel Weckop	Ford Focus	113
81	AT	13		(Germany) Titus Dittmann (Germany) Bernd Albrecht (Germany) Michael Lachmayer (Germany) Reinhard Schall	Dodge Viper	111
82	SP3	149	Toyota Team Thailand	(Thailand) Arto Smittachartch (Thailand) Nattavude Charoensukawattana (Thailand) Kantasak Kusiri (Thailand) Nattapong Hortongkum	Toyota Corolla Altis	111
83	Cup 5	312	(Germany) Bonk Motorsport	(Japan) Ryu Seya (Japan) Yousuke Shimojima (New Zealand) Guy Stewart (Germany) Jurgen Meyer	BMW M235i Racing	111
84	V4	186		(United States) Bruce Ledoux (United States) David Quinlan (Argentina) Rafael Moro (Germany) Hajo Müller	BMW E90 325i	109
85	Cup 5	313		(Germany) Martin Kaemena (Germany) Andreas Ott (Germany) Andreas Rappold (Germany) Thomas Müller	BMW M235i Racing	109
86	SP2T	133		(Germany) Ralf Zensen (Germany) Lothar Wilms (Germany) "Tony Stark" (Germany) "Steve Rogers"	BMW Mini JCW	109
87	SP3	155	Toyota Team Thailand	(Thailand) Grant Supaphongs (Taiwan) Chen Jian Hong (Thailand) Kulapalanon Manat (Thailand) Arthit Ruengsomboon	Toyota Corolla Altis	109
88	AT	208		(United Kingdom) Nick Barrow (United Kingdom) Richard Corbett (United States) Jamie Morrow (United Kingdom) Dave Cox	BMW 135D GTR	108
89	SP6	82	(Switzerland) Hofor Racing	(Switzerland) Chantal Kroll (Switzerland) Martin Kroll (Switzerland) Michael Kroll (Switzerland) Roland Eggimann	BMW M3 GTR	107
90	AT	209		(Germany) Ralph Caba (Germany) Klaus Volker Lange (Germany) Oliver Sprungmann	Ford Focus RS	106
91	SP4T	108		(Germany) Stephan Wolflick (Germany) Jurgen Gagstatter (Switzerland) Urs Bressan	Ford Focus	106
92	V5	181	(Argentina) Speedworxx Racing	(Argentina) Alessandro Salerno (Argentina) Jorgé Cersosimo (Argentina) Henry Martin (Argentina) Alejandro Chawan	BMW Z4	105
93	SP3	152	(Germany) Frikadelli Racing Team	(United States) John Shoffner (United States) Janine Hill (Germany) Thomas Leyherr (Germany) Herbert von Danwitz	Renault Clio	103
94	**V2T**	**203**		**(Austria) Fritz Rabensteiner (Austria) Manuel Scheriau (Germany) Uwe Stein (Germany) Martin Kautenburger**	**Opel Astra GTC/OPC**	**101**
95	Cup 1	252	(Denmark) Bliss Autosport	(Denmark) Roland Poulsen (Germany) Axel Duffner (Germany) Oliver Bliss (Germany) "Sepo Hunt"	Opel Astra OPC Cup	99
96	SP3	147		(Germany) Tobias Jung (Germany) Jessica Schüngel (Germany) Ulrich Schüngel (Germany) Jörg Morth	Opel Astra Gsi	95
97	Cup 5	314		(Germany) Fabian Finck (Germany) Patrick Hinte (Germany) Michael Mohr (Luxembourg) Yann Munhowen	BMW M235i Racing	94
98	SP2T	132	(South Korea) Hyundai Motor Deutschland GmbH	(Germany) Alexander Köppen (Finland) Rory Penttinen (Germany) Heiko Hammel (Germany) Thomas Kroher	Hyundai Veloster	92
99	Cup 5	315	(Germany) Race-House Motorsport	(Germany) Dag von Garrel (Germany) Olivier Fourcade (United Kingdom) Meyrick Cox (United Kingdom) Colin White	BMW M235i Racing	90
100	**SP5**	**107**		**(Germany) Patrick Rehs (Germany) Konstantin Wolf (Germany) Dieter Weidenbrück (Germany) Dietmar Henke**	**BMW 130i GTR**	**89**
101	SP6	77	(Germany) MSC-Rhon e.V. i. ADAC	(Germany) Michael Hess (Germany) "Hans Wilden" (Germany) Christian Leitheuser	BMW M3 GTR	89
102	**V3**	**196**	**(Switzerland) Toyota Swiss Racing Team**	**(Switzerland) Herbie Schmidt (Switzerland) Benjiamin Albertalli (Liechtenstein) Thomas Lampert (Switzerland) Manuel Amweg**	**Toyota GT86**	**86**
DNF	SP9 GT3	23	(Germany) Rowe Racing	(Germany) Klaus Graf (Germany) Christian Hohenadel (Germany) Nico Bastian (Germany) Thomas Jäger	Mercedes-Benz SLS AMG GT3	145
DNF	SP9 GT3	21	(Germany) Schulze Motorsport	(Germany) Michael Schulze (Germany) Tobias Schulze (Germany) Florian Strauss (France) Jordan Tresson	Nissan GT-R GT3	142
DNF	SP8	48	(United Kingdom) Aston Martin Test Centre	(Australia) Liam Talbot (Switzerland) Florian Kamelger (Japan) Shinichi Katsura (Germany) Wolfgang Schuhbauer	Aston Martin GT12	95
DNF	SP9 GT3	006	(United Kingdom) Aston Martin Racing	(United Kingdom) Jonathan Adam (New Zealand) Richie Stanaway (Austria) Mathias Lauda (Germany) Stefan Mücke	Aston Martin V12 Vantage GT3	94
DNF	SP8	50	(United Kingdom) Aston Martin Test Centre	(United Kingdom) Chris Harris (Germany) Oliver Mathai (United Kingdom) Peter Cate (Germany) Andreas Gülden	Aston Martin GT12	87
DNF	SP7	60	(Germany) Prosport-Performance GmbH	(United States) Charles Putman (United States) Charles Espenlaub (Norway) Oskar Sandberg (Germany) Christian Engelhart	Porsche 997 Cup	85
DNF	SP3	142	(Germany) Schlappi Race-Tec	(Germany) Holger Goedicke (Switzerland) Fabian Danz (Germany) Axel Friedhoff (Germany) Max Friedhoff	Renault Clio SRT	76
DNF	SP7	71	(Germany) raceunion Teichmann Racing	(Germany) Jens Esser (Germany) Osman Kara (United Kingdom) Henry Fletcher (Slovakia) Miro Konôpka	Porsche 997 GT3 Cup	75
DNF	SP5	106	(Germany) MSC-Rhon e.V. i. ADAC	(Germany) Harald Rettich (France) Fabrice Reicher (France) Dominique Nury (Austria) Richard Purtscher	BMW 1M-Coupe	75
DNF	SP6	161	(Germany) Black Falcon Team TMD Friction	(Germany) Sören Spreng (Germany) Aurel Schoeller (Germany) Christian Raubach (Germany) Jürgen Bleul	Porsche 911 Carrera	74
DNF	V6	164	(Germany) Team Mathol Racing e.V.	(Germany) Claudius Karch (Switzerland) Ivan Jacoma (Germany) Jorg Viebahn (United States) Jim Briody	Porsche Cayman S	62
DNF	SP9 GT3	22	(Germany) Rowe Racing	(Germany) Maro Engel (Netherlands) Renger van der Zande (Germany) Jan Seyffarth (Germany) Thomas Jäger	Mercedes-Benz SLS AMG GT3	61
DNF	SP9 GT3	1	(Germany) Audi Sport Team Phoenix	(Germany) Christopher Haase (Germany) Christian Mamerow (Germany) René Rast (Germany) Markus Winkelhock	Audi R8 LMS	59
DNF	V4	189		(Germany) Kornelius Hoffmann (Switzerland) Friedrich Obermeier (Germany) Rolf Derscheid (Germany) Jens Dahl	BMW 325i	59
DNF	SP7	67		(Germany) Andreas Weiland (Germany) Guido Wirtz (Germany) Oleg Kvitka (Russia) Aleksey Veremenko	Porsche 997 GT3	56
DNF	SP9 GT3	4	(Germany) Audi Sport Team Phoenix	(Germany) Marc Basseng (Switzerland) Marcel Fässler (Germany) Mike Rockenfeller (Germany) Frank Stippler	Audi R8 LMS	55
DNF	SP7	69	(Germany) Click vers.de Team	(Germany) Wolfgang Destree (Germany) Kersten Jodexnis (Germany) Edgar Salewsky (Germany) Robin Chrzanowski	Porsche 997 GT3 Cup	54
DNF	V3	193	(Germany) Pit Lane -AMC Sankt Vi	(Belgium) Olivier Muytjens (Germany) "Brody" (Italy) Bruno Barbaro (Belgium) Jacques Derenne	Toyota GT86	53
DNF	SP9 GT3	84	(United Kingdom) Bentley Motors Ltd.	(Netherlands) Jeroen Bleekemolen (Germany) Lance David Arnold (Germany) Christian Menzel (Germany) Christopher Brück	Bentley Continental GT3	52
DNF	SP8	45	(Germany) TeamCoach-Racing	(Germany) Philipp Göschel (Germany) Dirk Heldmann (Germany) Rolf Scheibner (Germany) Frank Weishar	BMW E92 M3	52
DNF	V2T	201	(Germany) mathilda racing - Team pistenkids	(Germany) Michael Paatz (Germany) Knut Kluge (Germany) Josef Kocsis (Germany) Lutz Rühl	VW Scirocco GT RS	52
DNF	SP6	79	(Germany) Prosport-Performance GmbH	(Switzerland) Klaus Bauer (Australia) Richard Gartner (Germany) Moritz Kranz (Germany) Andreas Patzelt	Porsche Cayman R	49
DNF	SP6	78	(Argentina) Speedworxx Racing	(Argentina) Juan Angel Cusano (Argentina) Stefano Cambria (Argentina) Sergio Yazbik (Argentina) Jose Manuel Balbiani	BMW E46 M3	48
DNF	Cup 5	302	(Germany) Team Securtal Sorg Rennsport	(Denmark) Anders Fjordbach (Germany) Philipp Leisen (Germany) Thomas Jäger (Germany) Heiko Eichenberg	BMW M235i Racing	48
DNF	SP9 GT3	19	(Germany) BMW Sports Trophy Team Schubert	(Germany) Alex Müller (United Kingdom) Alexander Sims (Germany) Dirk Werner (Germany) Marco Wittmann	BMW Z4 GT3	47
DNF	SP3	148		(Switzerland) Boris Hrubesch (Japan) Junichi Umemoto (Germany) Jürgen Peter (Denmark) Claus Gronning	Renault Clio Cup	47
DNF	SP9 GT3	30	(Germany) Frikadelli Racing Team	(Germany) Sabine Schmitz (Netherlands) Patrick Huisman (France) Patrick Pilet (Germany) Jörg Bergmeister	Porsche GT3 R	45
DNF	SP7	92	(Germany) Manthey Racing	(Germany) Christoph Breuer (Italy) Matteo Cairoli (Germany) Sven Müller (Germany) Mike Stursberg	Porsche 911 GT3 Cup MR	44
DNF	SP9 GT3	31	(Germany) Car Collection Motorsport	(Germany) Peter Schmidt (Germany) Alexander Mattschull (Germany) Pierre Ehret (United States) Vic Rice	Mercedes-Benz SLS AMG GT3	41
DNF	Cup 5	307	(Germany) Bonk Motorsport	(Germany) Alexander Mies (Germany) Jürgen Nett (Germany) Emin Akata	BMW M235i Racing	39
DNF	SP10 GT4	89		(Russia) Dmitry Lukovnikov (Germany) Axel Jahn (Germany) Michael Heimrich (Germany) Bernd Kleeschulte	Aston Martin Vantage V8 GT4	38
DNF	SP9 GT3	14	(Hong Kong) Audi race experience	(Austria) Nikolaus Mayr-Melnhof (Australia) Rod Salmon (Sweden) Micke Ohlsson (Switzerland) Ronnie Saurenmann	Audi R8 RMS ultra	37
DNF	SP8T	47	(Germany) TeamCoach-Racing	(Germany) Hans-Martin Gass (Germany) Heiko Hahn (Germany) Roland Konrad (Germany) Kristian Vetter	BMW E82	37
DNF	SP7	90	(Germany) Manthey Racing	(United Kingdom) Guy Smith (Germany) Nils Reimer (Germany) Reinhold Renger (Austria) Harald Proczyk	Porsche 911 GT3 Cup MR	36
DNF	AT	211	(Germany) Care for Climate	(Germany) Thomas von Löwis of Menar (Germany) "Smudo" (Germany) Daniel Schellhaas (Germany) Sascha Friedrich	VW Scirocco 2.0 TDI	35
DNF	SP9 GT3	8	(Germany) Haribo Racing Team	(Germany) Uwe Alzen (Germany) Marco Holzer (Austria) Norbert Siedler (Germany) Maximilian Götz	Mercedes-Benz SLS AMG GT3	34
DNF	SP4T	109	(United States) Rotek Racing	(United States) Robb Holland (New Zealand) Tony Richards (United States) David Thilenius (United Kingdom) Tom Chilton	Audi TT RS	33
DNF	Cup 5	304		(Germany) David Ackermann (Germany) Jörg Wiskirchen (Germany) Andrei Sidorenko (Hungary) Csaba Walter	BMW M235i Racing	33
DNF	SP8	46	(Germany) TeamCoach-Racing	(Germany) Rudi Adams (Germany) Dierk Moller Sonntag (Germany) Tom Moran (Germany) Arno Klasen	BMW E92 M3	33
DNF	SP9 GT3	2	(Germany) Black Falcon	(Germany) Bernd Schneider (Netherlands) Yelmer Buurman (Sweden) Andreas Simonsen (United Kingdom) Adam Christodoulou	Mercedes-Benz SLS AMG GT3	31
DNF	AT	210	(Germany) Heico Sportiv GmbH & Co KG	(Germany) Patrick Brenndörfer (Germany) Martin Müller (Germany) Franl Eickholt	Volvo V40 D5	30
DNF	SP7	56		(Germany) Georg Goder (Germany) Martin Schlüte (Germany) Dirk Leßmeister (Germany) Tim Scheerbarth	Porsche 997 GT3 Cup	28
DNF	V6	168	(Japan) Transit engineering	(Japan) Oi Takashi (Japan) Yamashita Junichiro (Japan) Seki Yutaka (Japan) Kato Teruaki	BMW E46 M3	24
DNF	SP9 GT3	20	(Germany) BMW Sports Trophy Team Schubert	(Austria) Dominik Baumann (Germany) Claudia Hürtgen (Germany) Jens Klingmann (Germany) Martin Tomczyk	BMW Z4 GT3	23
DNF	SP-Pro	10	(Germany) Wochenspiegel Team Manthey	(Germany) Georg Weiss (Germany) Oliver Kainz (Germany) Jochen Krumbach (Denmark) Michael Christensen	Porsche 911 GT3 RSR	23
DNF	V6	166	(Germany) Team Mathol Racing e.V.	(Switzerland) Rüdiger Schicht (Germany) Thorsten Held (Germany) Thomas Herbst (Germany) Uwe Nittel	Porsche Cayman S	20
DNF	SP9 GT3	27	(Germany) Team Zakspeed	(Germany) Sebastian Asch (Netherlands) Tom Coronel (Germany) Luca Ludwig (Germany) Christian Vietoris	Mercedes-Benz SLS AMG GT3	9
DNF	V5	178	(Germany) Black Falcon Team TMD Friction	(Germany) Sören Spreng (Germany) Aurel Schoeller (Switzerland) Christian Raubach (Germany) Jürgen Bleul	Porsche Cayman	9
DNF	V6	165	(Germany) Team Mathol Racing e.V.	(Germany) Wolfgang Weber (Germany) Norbert Bermes (Germany) Klaus Müller (Germany) Volker Wawer	Porsche Cayman R	5
DNS	SP-X	40	(United States) Scuderia Glickenhaus	(United States) Ken Dobson (United States) Jeff Westphal (Germany) Thomas Mutsch (France) Franck Mailleux	SCG 003C	0

== Bibliography ==
- Jörg-Richard Ufer & Tim Upietz. 24 Stunden Nürburgring Nordschleife 2015. Gruppe C Motorsport Verlag. ISBN 978-3-928540-78-0.
