= Tim Schrick =

German racing driver and television presenter (born 1976)

Tim Schrick (born January 20, 1976, in Wermelskirchen) is a German racecar driver and television presenter. He is the son of Peter Schrick, founder of engine manufacturing company Dr. Schrick GmbH now known as AVL-Schrick GmbH.

Schrick has made a number of starts in the 24 Hours Nürburgring endurance event as well as several other car racing championships such as the ADAC Volkswagen Polo Cup.

From September 2006 until end of 2008, along with Sabine Schmitz and Carsten van Ryssen, he has hosted a motoring program on German television channel DMAX known as D Motor, similar to the BBC's Top Gear.

Tim Schrick prepared an Aston Martin V8 Vantage which he entered in the 2009 24 Hours Nürburgring endurance race, ex-DTM driver Jörg van Ommen has been named as one of the drivers. The project is featured on the DMAX Channel. Sponsors include Sachs Race-Engineering, Eibach Springs, 3D-Flowtec, Schrick Camshafts and DMAX. The car suffered problems during qualifying and started from the pit lane for the race itself. Further problems were encountered in the first lap and the car could not make it back to the pit lane, prematurely ending the teams participation.

Schrick and his team have stated that they will continue their project, having received widespread support from the general public and the general motorsport community.

In 2010, Schrick, Ralf Goral, Patrick Bernhard and Wolfgang Weber tried again and finished (inoffical) 146 after 75 completed turns. Schrick left the team after the race (and some internal trouble), stating he has achieved his goal. "Team Schrick" will continue racing in 2011, otherwise as stated before even as "Team Schrick", but without Schrick.

From October 2010, Schrick hosts a motoring program on German television channel Sport1 called "Turbo", along with Sabine Schmitz and, from April 2011, Smudo, a German rapper.)

Schrick is among drivers who have been discussed in connection to BBC Top Gear anonymous driver 'The Stig'. However he raced against The Stig in the final episode of series 11 of Top Gear and lost, despite having a four-second head-start.

== AVL Schrick ==
In 1982, the German company Dr. Schrick GmbH, later renamed AVL Schrick, developed a double overhead camshaft (DOHC) multi-valve cylinder head for the Ford 1.6 L CVH engine block .
