= Hyundai Motor Europe =

Car manufacturer

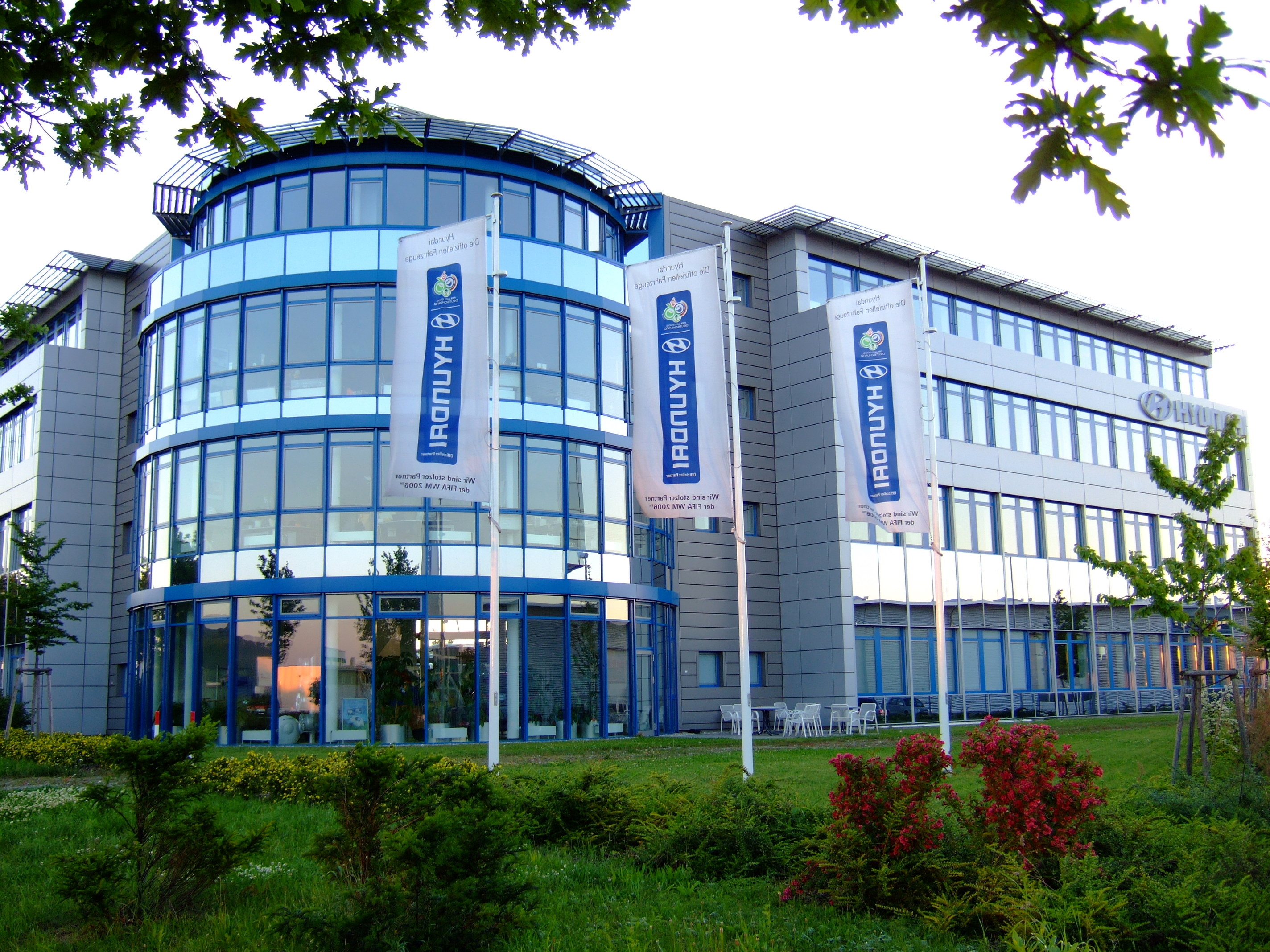
- Type: Subsidiary
- Industry: Automotive
- Founded: 2000; 26 years ago
- Headquarters: Offenbach am Main, Germany
- Key people: Michael Cole (President & CEO)
- Parent: Hyundai Motor Company
- Website: www.hyundai.com/eu/en/Main/index.html

Hyundai Motor Europe GmbH is the European division of South Korean automaker Hyundai Motor Company, its headquarters are in Offenbach am Main, Germany. It has a R&D center in Frankfurt and three manufacturing plants: one in Nošovice, Czech Republic; one in Saint Petersburg, Russia; and one in Turkey.

Three models (Hyundai Accent, Hyundai Elantra, and Hyundai Santa Fe) were produced at the TagAZ's plant in Taganrog. Its slogan for the European Market was "New Thinking, New Possibilities".

== History in Europe ==
Hyundai first imported passenger cars to Europe in 1978 with the launch of its Hyundai Pony on several left-hand drive markets, with the right-hand drive version launching the brand on the British market in 1982.

By 1984, Hyundai had launched a second model on the European market – the Stellar, a large rear-wheel drive family saloon based loosely on the Ford Cortina chassis. It was even advertised on the UK market as the spiritual successor to the Cortina. By 1990, with sales steadily rising across the continent, Hyundai was now a four-model brand in Europe, having launched the flagship Sonata saloon and Scoupe sports model onto the European market.

The 1980s Hyundai models were duly replaced during the 1990s, with the 1996 Hyundai Coupe being well received by the European motoring press.

Growing demand for MPVs and SUVs by the turn of the 21st century saw Hyundai venture into these new or expanding market sectors. By 2018, it was importing nine passenger vehicle ranges (some with two or more bodystyles) and two commercial vehicles ranges in Europe.

Hyundai has been particularly successful on the UK market since launching there in 1982. Its millionth UK market model was sold in 2015. Sales peaked at more than 93,000 units in 2017.

== Germany ==
In 1991, Hyundai Motor Deutschland GmbH was founded, formally based in Neckarsulm. The European headquarters have been in Offenbach since 2005. In 1991, Hyundai was also the first Korean car manufacturer in Germany at the International Motor Show in Frankfurt am Main. The company entered the German market by offering four model series (Pony, S-Coupé, Lantra and Sonata), thereby achieving around 2,886 new registrations. In the first full financial year in 1992, around 28,000 new registrations were achieved and in 1993 a total of 33,362 new registrations were achieved.

Hyundai has been operating an R&D centre in Frankfurt, Germany since 1994, that has been responsible for monitoring technology developments in Europe and designing and engineering new cars for the European market. In September 2003, the company opened its new European headquarters in Rüsselsheim, after an investment worth 50 million euro. The site became the new location for the R&D centre and for the world rally team of the company. Its R&D centre is also operated together with Kia.

== Czech Republic ==
In November 2008, Hyundai opened its European plant, Hyundai Motor Manufacturing Czech s r.o. (HMMC) in Nošovice, Czech Republic, following an investment of over 1 billion euros and over two years of construction. The plant, which mainly manufactures the i30, ix20, ix35 for the European market, has an annual capacity of 300,000 cars. The new Hyundai plant is 90 kilometres north of Kia Motors' Žilina Plant in Slovakia.

== Russia ==
In Russia, the production of the Hyundai Accent, Sonata, Elantra and Santa Fe models was done at the TagAZ plant from 2001 to 2014 in the form of complete knock-down kits assembly. In 2006, the factory also started assembling the Hyundai Porter, County, Aero Town and the HD 500 commercial vehicles.

In June 2008, Hyundai started the construction of a new manufacturing plant in Saint Petersburg with a planned yearly capacity of 100,000 cars, that will eventually be increased to 200,000 units. It started mass production in January 2011, with two models: the Hyundai Solaris and the Kia Rio.
