= Atle Gulbrandsen =

Norwegian racing driver

- Nationality: (Norway) Norwegian
- Born: 15 September 1979 (age 47) Hamar

VLN career
- Debut season: 2005
- Current team: Møller Bil Motorsport
- Starts: 82
- Wins: 17
- Poles: 8
- Fastest laps: 5
- Best finish: 1st in 2022 (TCR)

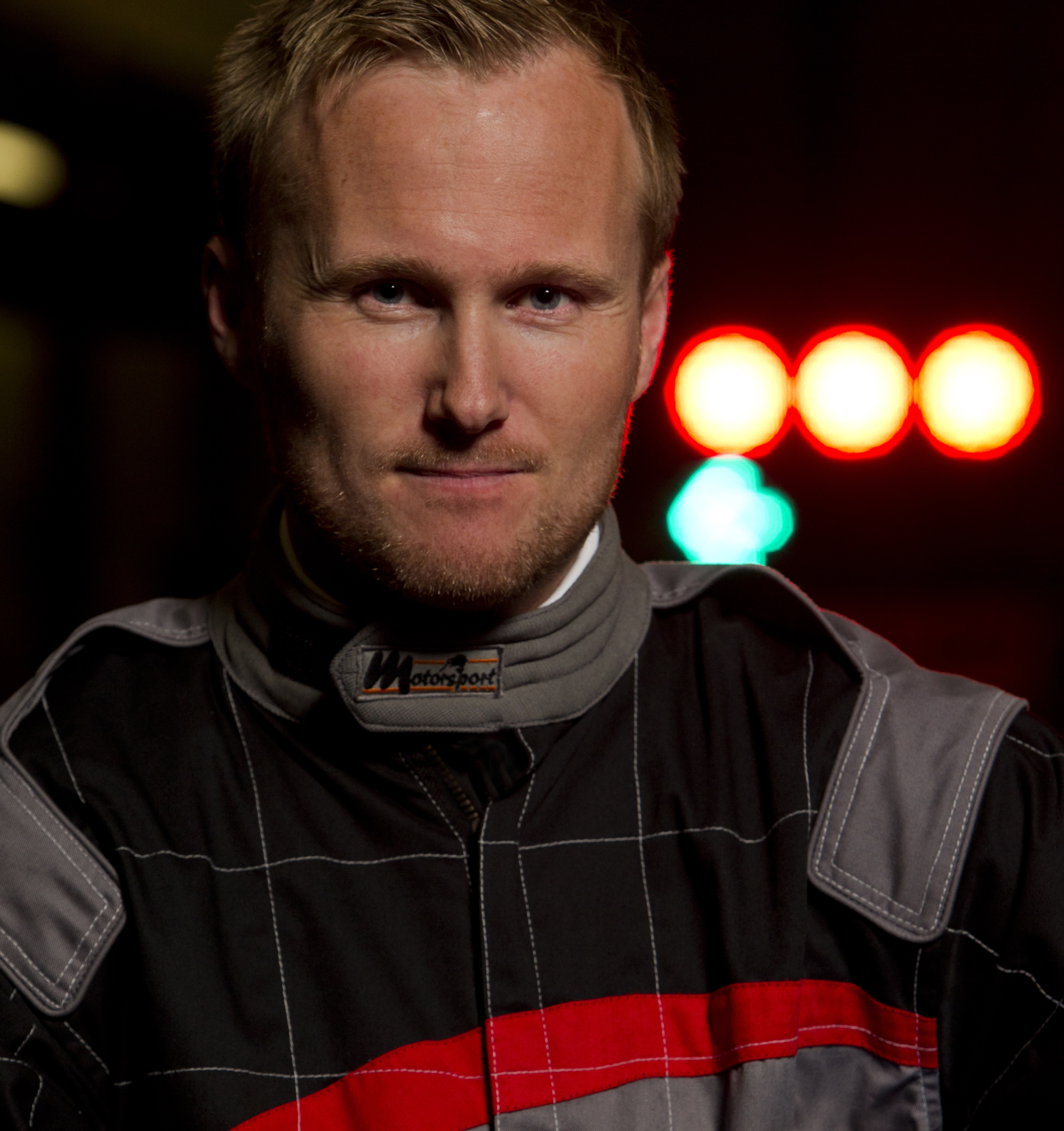
Gulbrandsen in 2011

Atle Gulbrandsen (born 15 September 1979 in Hamar, Norway) is a racing driver and television announcer.

== Racing career ==
Gulbrandsen started with karting in Norway in 1992, and drove some other junior series before he did the Skip Barber Southern Series in the USA in 2003/2004, finishing fourth.

Since 2005, Gulbrandsen has participated in the German VLN Endurance Series at the Nürburgring Nordschleife, with several victories for the Norwegian Audi Dealer Team. In 2022 and 2023, Gulbrandsen and his team won the TCR-class in the championship.

In 2007, Gulbrandsen also became the Norwegian Seven Racing Champion, and in 2021 he did a race in the Norwegian GT Championship with a Lamborghini GT3.

== Television career ==
In 1997, Gulbrandsen became the world's youngest Formula 1 commentator at 17, when he did the announcing for Canal+ Norway. He has since commentated Formula 1 for NRK, TV2, TV3, Viasat Motor and Viaplay, and been a host for several TV shows about Formula 1, WRC and other motor sports.

Gulbrandsen has also worked as a motoring journalist, consultant and sporting director for the Norwegian ASN. In 2010 he wrote the book "Grand Prix" together with Morten Malmø, and in 2022 the book "Formel 1" together with Thomas Karlsen. He is the Norwegian voice of "Darrell Cartrip" in the Norwegian version of the Pixar movie Cars.

Gulbrandsen has tested a Formula E-car, an electric rallycross Supercar and a Porsche Mission R, and holds talks about how new technology developed in motorsports can cut the emissions from the transport sector.

== Racing record ==
=== Career summary ===
Season	Series	Team Name	Races	Wins	Poles	Points	Position
1995	Renault 5 Junior Sweden	Atle Gulbrandsen Racing	10	0	0	?	6th
1996	Opel Corsa Junior Norway	Pro Drive	8	0	0	?	4th
2001	Roadsport Norway	Atle Gulbrandsen Racing	6	5	5	?	2nd
2002	Roadsport Norway	Atle Gulbrandsen Racing	4	4	4	?	2nd
2003	Roadsport Norway	Atle Gulbrandsen Racing	3	2	2	?	2nd
2004	Skip Barber Southern Series USA	Skip Barber Racing	12	3	4	?	4th
2005	VLN Series	Olrud Mobil 1 Racing	4	0	0	?	?
2006	VLN Series	Olrud Mobil 1 Racing	6	0	0	?	?
2006	24 Hours of Nürburgring - SP3	MSC Ruhr-Blitz Bochum e.V. im ADAC	1	0	0	N/A	12th
2007	VLN Series	Olrud Mobil 1 Racing	6	1	1	?	?
2007	Seven Racing Norway	Roger Moen Motorsport	10	3	3	?	1st
2007	24 Hours of Nürburgring - SP3		1	0	0	N/A	3rd
2008	VLN Series	Møller Bil Motorsport	5	1	1	?	?
2009	VLN Series	Møller Bil Motorsport	5	0	0	?	?
2009	24 Hours of Nürburgring - SP3T	Team Hakon Schjaerin	1	0	0	N/A	DNF
2010	VLN Series	Møller Bil Motorsport	6	1	0	?	?
2011	VLN Series	Møller Bil Motorsport	6	1	0	?	?
2011	24 Hours of Nürburgring - SP3T		1	0	0	N/A	DNF
2012	VLN Series	Møller Bil Motorsport	6	0	0	?	?
2013	VLN Series	Møller Bil Motorsport	6	1	1	?	?
2014	VLN Series	Møller Bil Motorsport	6	2	0	?	?
2015	VLN Series	Møller Bil Motorsport	6	2	2	?	?
2016	VLN Series	Møller Bil Motorsport	5	2	2	?	?
2016	Audi Sport TT Cup	Audi Sport	1	0	0	0	NC†
2017	VLN Series	Møller Bil Motorsport	5	1	1	?	2nd
2018	VLN Series - TCR	Møller Bil Motorsport	4	3	2	?	2nd
2019	VLN Series - TCR	Møller Bil Motorsport	4	1	1	?	2nd
2021	Norwegian GT Championship	Team Autosport	1	0	0	?	2nd
2022	Nürburgring Langstrecken-Serie - TCR	Møller Bil Motorsport	2	0	0	?	1st
2023	Nürburgring Langstrecken-Serie - TCR	Møller Bil Motorsport	1	1	0	?	1st
2024	Nürburgring Langstrecken-Serie - TCR	Møller Bil Motorsport					
2025	Nürburgring Langstrecken-Serie - TCR	Møller Bil Motorsport					
2026	Nürburgring Langstrecken-Serie - TCR	Møller Bil Motorsport					
