= 2005 VLN Series =

Motorsport season

Seasons
- ← 2004 2006 →

The 2005 BFGoodrich Langstreckenmeisterschaft (BFGLM) season was the 28th season of the VLN.

The drivers championship was won by Claudia Hürtgen, driving a BMW 320 for Schubert Motorsport.

== Calendar ==
Rnd.	Race	Length	Circuit	Date
1	54. ADAC-Westfalenfahrt	4 hours	(Germany) Nürburgring Nordschleife	March 19
2	47. ADAC-ACAS-H&R-Cup	4 hours	(Germany) Nürburgring Nordschleife	April 23
3	36. Adenauer ADAC Rundstrecken-Trophy	4 hours	(Germany) Nürburgring Nordschleife	June 11
4	45. ADAC-Reinoldus Langstreckenrennen	4 hours	(Germany) Nürburgring Nordschleife	July 2
5	28. RCM-DMV-Grenzlandrennen	4 hours	(Germany) Nürburgring Nordschleife	July 16
6	6h ADAC Ruhr-Pokal-Rennen	6 hours	(Germany) Nürburgring Nordschleife	August 27
7	37. ADAC-Barbarossapreis	4 hours	(Germany) Nürburgring Nordschleife	September 24
8	29. DMV-250 Meilen Rennen	4 hours	(Germany) Nürburgring Nordschleife	October 8
9	30. DMV-Münsterlandpokal	4 hours	(Germany) Nürburgring Nordschleife	October 22
10	30. DMV-4-Stunden Rennen	4 hours	(Germany) Nürburgring Nordschleife	November 5 (Note: The 30. DMV-4-Stunden Rennen was originally scheduled for April 9, the second event on the calendar. However, it was cancelled due to snowfall and rescheduled for November 5.)

== Race results ==
Results indicate overall winners only.

Rnd	Circuit	Pole position	Winners
1	(Germany) Nürburgring Nordschleife	No. 77 H&R-Spezialfedern	Cancelled due to fog (Note: The opening race was cancelled after 56 minutes due to worsening fog, and was not restarted. Since less than the minimum 80 minutes of green-flag running took place, no official race classification was given.)
1	(Germany) Nürburgring Nordschleife	(Germany) Jürgen Alzen (Germany) Uwe Alzen	Cancelled due to fog
2	(Germany) Nürburgring Nordschleife	No. 111 Manthey Racing	No. 96 Land-Motorsport
2	(Germany) Nürburgring Nordschleife	(Germany) Lucas Luhr (Germany) Timo Bernhard (France) Emmanuel Collard	(Germany) Marc Basseng (Germany) Marc Lieb (Germany) Mike Rockenfeller
3	(Germany) Nürburgring Nordschleife	No. 77 H&R-Spezialfedern	No. 96 Land-Motorsport
3	(Germany) Nürburgring Nordschleife	(Germany) Jürgen Alzen (Germany) Uwe Alzen	(Germany) Marc Basseng (Germany) Mike Rockenfeller
4	(Germany) Nürburgring Nordschleife	No. 348 Rheydter Club für Motorsport	No. 111 Manthey Racing
4	(Germany) Nürburgring Nordschleife	(Germany) Hermann Tilke (Germany) Dirk Adorf	(Germany) Lucas Luhr (Germany) Michael Jacobs
5	(Germany) Nürburgring Nordschleife	No. 77 H&R-Spezialfedern	No. 111 Manthey Racing
5	(Germany) Nürburgring Nordschleife	(Germany) Jürgen Alzen (Germany) Uwe Alzen	(Germany) Arno Klasen (Germany) Michael Jacobs
6	(Germany) Nürburgring Nordschleife	No. 111 Manthey Racing	No. 77 H&R-Spezialfedern
6	(Germany) Nürburgring Nordschleife	(Germany) Lucas Luhr (Germany) Arno Klasen (Germany) Wilhelm Kern	(Germany) Jürgen Alzen (Germany) Uwe Alzen
7	(Germany) Nürburgring Nordschleife	No. 77 H&R-Spezialfedern	No. 77 H&R-Spezialfedern
7	(Germany) Nürburgring Nordschleife	(Germany) Jürgen Alzen (Germany) Uwe Alzen	(Germany) Jürgen Alzen (Germany) Uwe Alzen
8	(Germany) Nürburgring Nordschleife	No. 77 H&R-Spezialfedern	No. 111 Manthey Racing
8	(Germany) Nürburgring Nordschleife	(Germany) Jürgen Alzen (Germany) Uwe Alzen	(Germany) Timo Bernhard (Germany) Olaf Manthey
9	(Germany) Nürburgring Nordschleife	No. 111 Manthey Racing	No. 96 Land-Motorsport
9	(Germany) Nürburgring Nordschleife	(Germany) Timo Bernhard	(Germany) Marc Basseng (Germany) Patrick Simon
10	(Germany) Nürburgring Nordschleife	No. 66 Zakspeed Racing	No. 96 Land-Motorsport
10	(Germany) Nürburgring Nordschleife	(Germany) Dr. Hans-Peter Huppert-Nieder (Germany) Sascha Bert (Germany) Peter Zakowski	(Germany) Marc Basseng (Germany) Patrick Simon

== Bibliography ==
- Jörg Hildebrand, Hasso Jacoby & Wolfgang Sievernich. Grüne Hölle 2005: Die Langstreckenrennen auf dem Nürburgring (in German). Hackethal Verlag. ISBN 978-3936285185.
