= 2007 VLN Series =

Motorsport season

Seasons
- ← 2006 2008 →

The 2007 BFGoodrich Langstreckenmeisterschaft (BFGLM) season was the 30th season of the VLN.

The drivers championship was won by Heinz-Otto Fritzsche, Jürgen Fritzsche and Marco Wolf, driving an Opel Astra for Kissling Motorsport.

== Calendar ==
| Rnd. | Race | Length | Circuit | Date |
|---|---|---|---|---|
| 1 | 55. ADAC Westfalenfahrt | 4 hours | (Germany) Nürburgring Nordschleife | March 31 |
| 2 | 32. DMV 4-Stunden-Rennen | 4 hours | (Germany) Nürburgring Nordschleife | April 14 |
| 3 | 49. ADAC ACAS H&R-Cup | 4 hours | (Germany) Nürburgring Nordschleife | April 28 |
| 4 | 38. Adenauer ADAC Rundstrecken-Trophy | 4 hours | (Germany) Nürburgring Nordschleife | May 12 |
| 5 | 47. ADAC Reinoldus-Langstreckenrennen | 4 hours | (Germany) Nürburgring Nordschleife | May 26 |
| 6 | 30. RCM DMV Grenzlandrennen | 4 hours | (Germany) Nürburgring Nordschleife | August 18 |
| 7 | 6h ADAC Ruhr-Pokal-Rennen | 6 hours | (Germany) Nürburgring Nordschleife | September 15 |
| 8 | 39. ADAC Barbarossapreis | 4 hours | (Germany) Nürburgring Nordschleife | September 29 |
| 9 | 31. DMV 250-Meilen-Rennen | 4 hours | (Germany) Nürburgring Nordschleife | October 13 |
| 10 | 32. DMV Münsterlandpokal | 4 hours | (Germany) Nürburgring Nordschleife | October 27 |

== Race results ==
Results indicate overall winners only.

| Rnd | Circuit | Pole position | Winners |
|---|---|---|---|
| 1 | (Germany) Nürburgring Nordschleife | No. 440 Schall Motorsport | No. 123 Mamerow Racing |
| 1 | (Germany) Nürburgring Nordschleife | (Germany) Andreas Schall (Germany) Ralf Schall (Germany) Volker Strycek | (Germany) Peter Mamerow (Germany) Christian Mamerow |
| 2 | (Germany) Nürburgring Nordschleife | No. 123 Mamerow Racing | No. 108 Land-Motorsport |
| 2 | (Germany) Nürburgring Nordschleife | (Germany) Peter Mamerow (Germany) Christian Mamerow | (Germany) Marc Basseng (Germany) Marc Hennerici (Germany) Dirk Adorf |
| 3 | (Germany) Nürburgring Nordschleife | No. 108 Land-Motorsport | No. 108 Land-Motorsport |
| 3 | (Germany) Nürburgring Nordschleife | (Germany) Marc Basseng (Germany) Marc Hennerici (Germany) Dirk Adorf | (Germany) Marc Basseng (Germany) Marc Hennerici (Germany) Dirk Adorf |
| 4 | (Germany) Nürburgring Nordschleife | No. 108 Land-Motorsport | No. 108 Land-Motorsport |
| 4 | (Germany) Nürburgring Nordschleife | (Germany) Marc Basseng (Germany) Marc Hennerici (Germany) Dirk Adorf | (Germany) Marc Basseng (Germany) Marc Hennerici (Germany) Dirk Adorf |
| 5 | (Germany) Nürburgring Nordschleife | No. 111 Manthey Racing | No. 111 Manthey Racing |
| 5 | (Germany) Nürburgring Nordschleife | (Germany) Timo Bernhard (France) Romain Dumas | (Germany) Timo Bernhard (France) Romain Dumas |
| 6 | (Germany) Nürburgring Nordschleife | No. 108 Land-Motorsport | No. 108 Land-Motorsport |
| 6 | (Germany) Nürburgring Nordschleife | (Germany) Marc Basseng (Germany) Marc Hennerici | (Germany) Marc Basseng (Germany) Marc Hennerici |
| 7 | (Germany) Nürburgring Nordschleife | No. 111 Manthey Racing | No. 111 Manthey Racing |
| 7 | (Germany) Nürburgring Nordschleife | (Germany) Marcel Tiemann (France) Romain Dumas (Germany) Arno Klasen | (Germany) Marcel Tiemann (France) Romain Dumas (Germany) Arno Klasen |
| 8 | (Germany) Nürburgring Nordschleife | No. 111 Manthey Racing | No. 111 Manthey Racing |
| 8 | (Germany) Nürburgring Nordschleife | (Germany) Marcel Tiemann (Germany) Marc Lieb (Germany) Arno Klasen | (Germany) Marcel Tiemann (Germany) Marc Lieb (Germany) Arno Klasen |
| 9 | (Germany) Nürburgring Nordschleife | No. 111 Manthey Racing | No. 111 Manthey Racing |
| 9 | (Germany) Nürburgring Nordschleife | (Germany) Marcel Tiemann (Germany) Marc Lieb (Germany) Arno Klasen | (Germany) Marcel Tiemann (Germany) Marc Lieb (Germany) Arno Klasen |
| 10 | (Germany) Nürburgring Nordschleife | No. 109 Hankook / H&R-Spezialfedern | No. 108 Land-Motorsport |
| 10 | (Germany) Nürburgring Nordschleife | (Germany) Jürgen Alzen (Germany) Uwe Alzen | (Germany) Marc Basseng (Germany) Marc Hennerici |

== See also ==
- 2007 24 Hours of Nürburgring

== Bibliography ==
- Jörg Hildebrand, Hasso Jacoby & Wolfgang Sievernich. Grüne Hölle 2007: Die Langstreckenrennen auf dem Nürburgring (in German). Hackethal Verlag. ISBN 978-3-936285-22-2.
