= 2008 VLN Series =

Motorsport season

Seasons
- ← 2007 2009 →

The 2008 BFGoodrich Langstreckenmeisterschaft (BFGLM) season was the 31st season of the VLN.

The drivers championship was won by Alexander Böhm and Matthias Unger, driving a BMW 325i for Black Falcon.

== Calendar ==
Rnd.	Race	Length	Circuit	Date
1	56. ADAC Westfalenfahrt	4 hours	(Germany) Nürburgring Nordschleife	March 29
2	33. DMV 4-Stunden-Rennen	4 hours	(Germany) Nürburgring Nordschleife	April 12
3	50. ADAC ACAS H&R-Cup	4 hours	(Germany) Nürburgring Nordschleife	April 26
4	39. Adenauer ADAC Rundstrecken-Trophy	4 hours	(Germany) Nürburgring Nordschleife	May 10
5	48. ADAC Reinoldus-Langstreckenrennen	4 hours	(Germany) Nürburgring Nordschleife	June 21
6	31. DMV Grenzlandrennen	4 hours	(Germany) Nürburgring Nordschleife	July 5
7	6h ADAC Ruhr-Pokal-Rennen	6 hours	(Germany) Nürburgring Nordschleife	July 19
8	40. ADAC Barbarossapreis	4 hours	(Germany) Nürburgring Nordschleife	September 13
9	32. DMV 250-Meilen-Rennen	4 hours	(Germany) Nürburgring Nordschleife	October 11
10	33. DMV Münsterlandpokal	4 hours	(Germany) Nürburgring Nordschleife	October 25
11	BFGoodrich Trophy	4 hours	(Germany) Nürburgring Nordschleife	November 9

== Race results ==
Results indicate overall winners only.

Rnd	Circuit	Pole position	Winners
1	(Germany) Nürburgring Nordschleife	Cancelled due to snow	
2	(Germany) Nürburgring Nordschleife	No. 111 Manthey Racing	No. 111 Manthey Racing
2	(Germany) Nürburgring Nordschleife	(Germany) Marc Lieb (Germany) Marcel Tiemann	(Germany) Marc Lieb (Germany) Marcel Tiemann
3	(Germany) Nürburgring Nordschleife	No. 87 Zakspeed Racing	No. 131 HISAQ Competition
3	(Germany) Nürburgring Nordschleife	(Netherlands) Tom Coronel (Netherlands) Duncan Huisman (Germany) Sascha Bert	(United Kingdom) Marino Franchitti (Germany) Frank Stippler
4	(Germany) Nürburgring Nordschleife	No. 170 Schubert Motorsport	No. 120 Team mb Autotechnik
4	(Germany) Nürburgring Nordschleife	(Norway) Stian Sørlie (Germany) Claudia Hürtgen (Sweden) Richard Göransson	(Germany) Michael Bäder (Germany) Tobias Hagenmeyer
5	(Germany) Nürburgring Nordschleife	No. 108 Land-Motorsport	No. 108 Land-Motorsport
5	(Germany) Nürburgring Nordschleife	(Germany) Marc Basseng (Germany) Johannes Stuck	(Germany) Marc Basseng (Germany) Johannes Stuck
6	(Germany) Nürburgring Nordschleife	No. 111 Manthey Racing	No. 111 Manthey Racing
6	(Germany) Nürburgring Nordschleife	(France) Romain Dumas (Germany) Marcel Tiemann (Germany) Arno Klasen	(France) Romain Dumas (Germany) Marcel Tiemann (Germany) Arno Klasen
7	(Germany) Nürburgring Nordschleife	No. 111 Manthey Racing	No. 111 Manthey Racing
7	(Germany) Nürburgring Nordschleife	(Germany) Marc Lieb (Germany) Marcel Tiemann (Germany) Arno Klasen	(Germany) Marc Lieb (Germany) Marcel Tiemann (Germany) Arno Klasen
8	(Germany) Nürburgring Nordschleife	Cancelled due to diesel on the circuit	
9	(Germany) Nürburgring Nordschleife	No. 88 Hankook / H&R-Spezialfedern	No. 111 Manthey Racing
9	(Germany) Nürburgring Nordschleife	(Germany) Jürgen Alzen (Germany) Uwe Alzen	(Germany) Marcel Tiemann (Germany) Arno Klasen
10	(Germany) Nürburgring Nordschleife	No. 108 Land-Motorsport	No. 111 Manthey Racing
10	(Germany) Nürburgring Nordschleife	(Germany) Marc Basseng (Germany) Dirk Werner	(Germany) Marcel Tiemann (Germany) Arno Klasen
11	(Germany) Nürburgring Nordschleife	No. 88 Hankook / H&R-Spezialfedern	No. 108 Land-Motorsport
11	(Germany) Nürburgring Nordschleife	(Germany) Jürgen Alzen (Germany) Uwe Alzen	(Germany) Marc Basseng (Germany) Dirk Werner

== See also ==
- 2008 24 Hours of Nürburgring

== Bibliography ==
- Jörg Hildebrand, Hasso Jacoby & Wolfgang Sievernich. Grüne Hölle 2008: Die Langstreckenrennen auf dem Nürburgring (in German). Hackethal Verlag. ISBN 978-3936285284.
