= 2006 VLN Series =

Motorsport season

Seasons
- ← 2005 2007 →

The 2006 BFGoodrich Langstreckenmeisterschaft (BFGLM) season was the 29th season of the VLN.

The drivers championship was won by Mario Merten and Wolf Silvester, driving a BMW 318iS for Bonk Motorsport.

== Calendar ==
| Rnd. | Race | Length | Circuit | Date |
|---|---|---|---|---|
| 1 | 55. ADAC-Westfalenfahrt | 4 hours | (Germany) Nürburgring Nordschleife | March 25 |
| 2 | 31. DMV-4-Stunden Rennen | 4 hours | (Germany) Nürburgring Nordschleife | April 8 |
| 3 | 48. ADAC-ACAS-H&R-Cup | 4 hours | (Germany) Nürburgring Nordschleife | April 22 |
| 4 | 37. Adenauer ADAC Rundstrecken-Trophy | 4 hours | (Germany) Nürburgring Nordschleife | May 20 |
| 5 | 46. ADAC-Reinoldus Langstreckenrennen | 4 hours | (Germany) Nürburgring Nordschleife | July 8 |
| 6 | 29. RCM-DMV-Grenzlandrennen | 4 hours | (Germany) Nürburgring Nordschleife | July 29 |
| 7 | 6h ADAC Ruhr-Pokal-Rennen | 6 hours | (Germany) Nürburgring Nordschleife | August 26 |
| 8 | 38. ADAC-Barbarossapreis | 4 hours | (Germany) Nürburgring Nordschleife | September 30 |
| 9 | 30. DMV-250 Meilen Rennen | 4 hours | (Germany) Nürburgring Nordschleife | October 14 |
| 10 | 31. DMV-Münsterlandpokal | 4 hours | (Germany) Nürburgring Nordschleife | October 28 |

== Race results ==
Results indicate overall winners only.

| Rnd | Circuit | Pole position | Winners |
|---|---|---|---|
| 1 | (Germany) Nürburgring Nordschleife | Cancelled due to weather | |
| 2 | (Germany) Nürburgring Nordschleife | No. 111 Manthey Racing | No. 111 Manthey Racing |
| 2 | (Germany) Nürburgring Nordschleife | (Germany) Lucas Luhr (Germany) Timo Bernhard (Germany) Marcel Tiemann | (Germany) Lucas Luhr (Germany) Timo Bernhard (Germany) Marcel Tiemann |
| 3 | (Germany) Nürburgring Nordschleife | No. 111 Manthey Racing | No. 111 Manthey Racing |
| 3 | (Germany) Nürburgring Nordschleife | (Germany) Lucas Luhr (Germany) Timo Bernhard (Germany) Marcel Tiemann | (Germany) Lucas Luhr (Germany) Timo Bernhard (Germany) Marcel Tiemann |
| 4 | (Germany) Nürburgring Nordschleife | No. 96 Land-Motorsport | No. 96 Land-Motorsport |
| 4 | (Germany) Nürburgring Nordschleife | (Germany) Marc Basseng (Germany) Patrick Simon | (Germany) Marc Basseng (Germany) Patrick Simon |
| 5 | (Germany) Nürburgring Nordschleife | No. 109 H&R-Spezialfedern | No. 109 H&R-Spezialfedern |
| 5 | (Germany) Nürburgring Nordschleife | (Germany) Jürgen Alzen (Germany) Uwe Alzen | (Germany) Jürgen Alzen (Germany) Uwe Alzen |
| 6 | (Germany) Nürburgring Nordschleife | No. 96 Land-Motorsport | No. 96 Land-Motorsport |
| 6 | (Germany) Nürburgring Nordschleife | (Germany) Marc Basseng (Germany) Patrick Simon | (Germany) Marc Basseng (Germany) Patrick Simon |
| 7 | (Germany) Nürburgring Nordschleife | No. 111 Manthey Racing | No. 100 |
| 7 | (Germany) Nürburgring Nordschleife | (Germany) Michael Jacobs (Germany) Arno Klasen (Germany) Marcel Tiemann | (Germany) Michael Bäder (Germany) Tobias Hagenmeyer (Germany) Markus Gedlich |
| 8 | (Germany) Nürburgring Nordschleife | No. 96 Land-Motorsport | No. 96 Land-Motorsport |
| 8 | (Germany) Nürburgring Nordschleife | (Germany) Marc Basseng (Germany) Patrick Simon | (Germany) Marc Basseng (Germany) Patrick Simon |
| 9 | (Germany) Nürburgring Nordschleife | No. 96 Land-Motorsport | No. 96 Land-Motorsport |
| 9 | (Germany) Nürburgring Nordschleife | (Germany) Marc Basseng (Germany) Patrick Simon | (Germany) Marc Basseng (Germany) Patrick Simon |
| 10 | (Germany) Nürburgring Nordschleife | No. 96 Land-Motorsport | No. 96 Land-Motorsport |
| 10 | (Germany) Nürburgring Nordschleife | (Germany) Marc Basseng (Germany) Patrick Simon | (Germany) Marc Basseng (Germany) Patrick Simon |

== See also ==
- 2006 24 Hours of Nürburgring

== Bibliography ==
- Jörg Hildebrand, Hasso Jacoby & Wolfgang Sievernich. Grüne Hölle 2006: Die Langstreckenrennen auf dem Nürburgring (in German). Hackethal Verlag. ISBN 978-3-936285-20-8.
