= Klaus Abbelen =

German race car driver (born 1960)

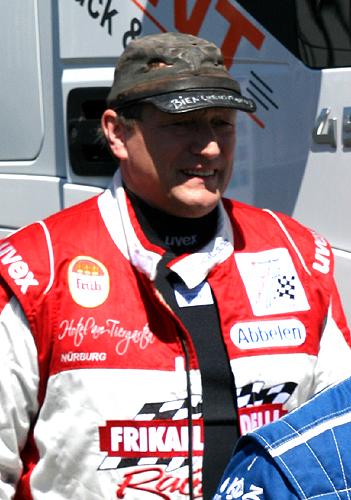
- Abbelen in 2009
- Nationality: (Germany) German
- Born: 15 September 1960 (age 66) Tönisvorst, West Germany
- Relatives: Sabine Schmitz (spouse)

Nürburgring Langstrecken-Serie
- Categorisation: FIA Bronze
- Years active: 2006–25
- Teams: Frikadelli Racing
- Starts: 82
- Wins: 10
- Poles: 8
- Fastest laps: 12
- Best finish: 2nd in 2014

Previous series
- 1999; 2001–02; 2003–04; 2003, 2005–06; 2021–23; 2022–24: Ferrari Porsche Challenge; Euro GT Series; FIA GT Championship; Porsche Supercup; Le Mans Cup; Prototype Cup Germany

Championship titles
- 2001: Euro GT Series

Klaus Abbelen (born 15 September 1960) is a German racing driver and businessman.

Abbelen was a regular participant in races sanctioned at the Nürburgring, including the Nürburgring Langstrecken-Serie and the Nürburgring 24 Hours. He finished on the overall podium of the 2008 24 Hours of Nürburgring and, as the team principal of Frikadelli Racing, won the 2023 24 Hours of Nürburgring. He retired from racing at the Nürburgring in September 2025 and currently competes only in historic racing events.

Abbelen owned his family's business Abbelen GmbH, a German Frikadelle manufacturer, until 2017. Abbelen was also married to German racing driver Sabine Schmitz before her death in 2021.

== Racing career ==
=== Early career ===
Abbelen's career began in motorcycle racing, rather than cars, in the late 1970s and early 1980s. He switched to cars towards the turn of the century and participated in the 1999 Ferrari Porsche challenge, finishing second in his class.

In 2002, Abbelen attempted to run the 24 Hours of Nürburgring, but failed to get in. In 2022, Abbelen placing third overall in the Euro GT Series, and the following year made one appearance in the same series, one in the 2003 Porsche Supercup, and one in the FFSA GT Championship, driving a Porsche 911 for Chateau Sport for two races along with racer Stéphane Ortelli. The pair would fail to reach podium and would settle for a 41st in the final standings. In 2004, Abbelen ran in the Le Mans Endurance Series, driving a Saleen S7-R for Konrad Motorsport in one race.

=== Nürburgring competition ===
Abbelen was a frequent participant of races at the Nürburgring. He took his first win in the series in 2013 in the fourth round of the VLN Series. In 2008, he finished on the overall podium at the 24 Hours of Nürburgring for the first time.

Abbelen's trips to the Nürburgring extended outside of NLS and the 24 hour race. In 2019, he entered the Nürburgring round of ADAC GT Masters. In 2024, he competed in the Nürburgring round of the GT World Challenge Europe Endurance Cup, his first GTWC start.

Abbelen announced his retirement ahead of the NLS8 round in the 2025 Nürburgring Langstrecken-Serie. After suffering an early end to his race with a gearbox issue, he momentarily postponed his retirement to compete in the next round in NLS9. By finishing the race, he became the first GT3 driver to complete an NLS race solo, and finished second in the SP9 Am class.

=== Other ventures ===
Abbelen competed in the 24 Hours of Daytona for the first time in 2016, racing alongside Patrick Huisman, Sven Müller, Frank Stippler, and his wife Sabine Schmitz. On race day, the crew finished 12th in the GTD class.

In 2024, Abbelen competed in the full Prototype Cup Germany season, having competed in the Nürburgring rounds in both 2022 and 2023, finishing on the podium in the former. He drove a Ligier JS P320 alongside Felipe Fernández Laser. In the final race at the Hockenheimring, Abbelen took his first and only win in the series.

Abbelen competed in some historic racing events in a Porsche 962 in 2025 and 2026.

== Frikadelli Racing ==
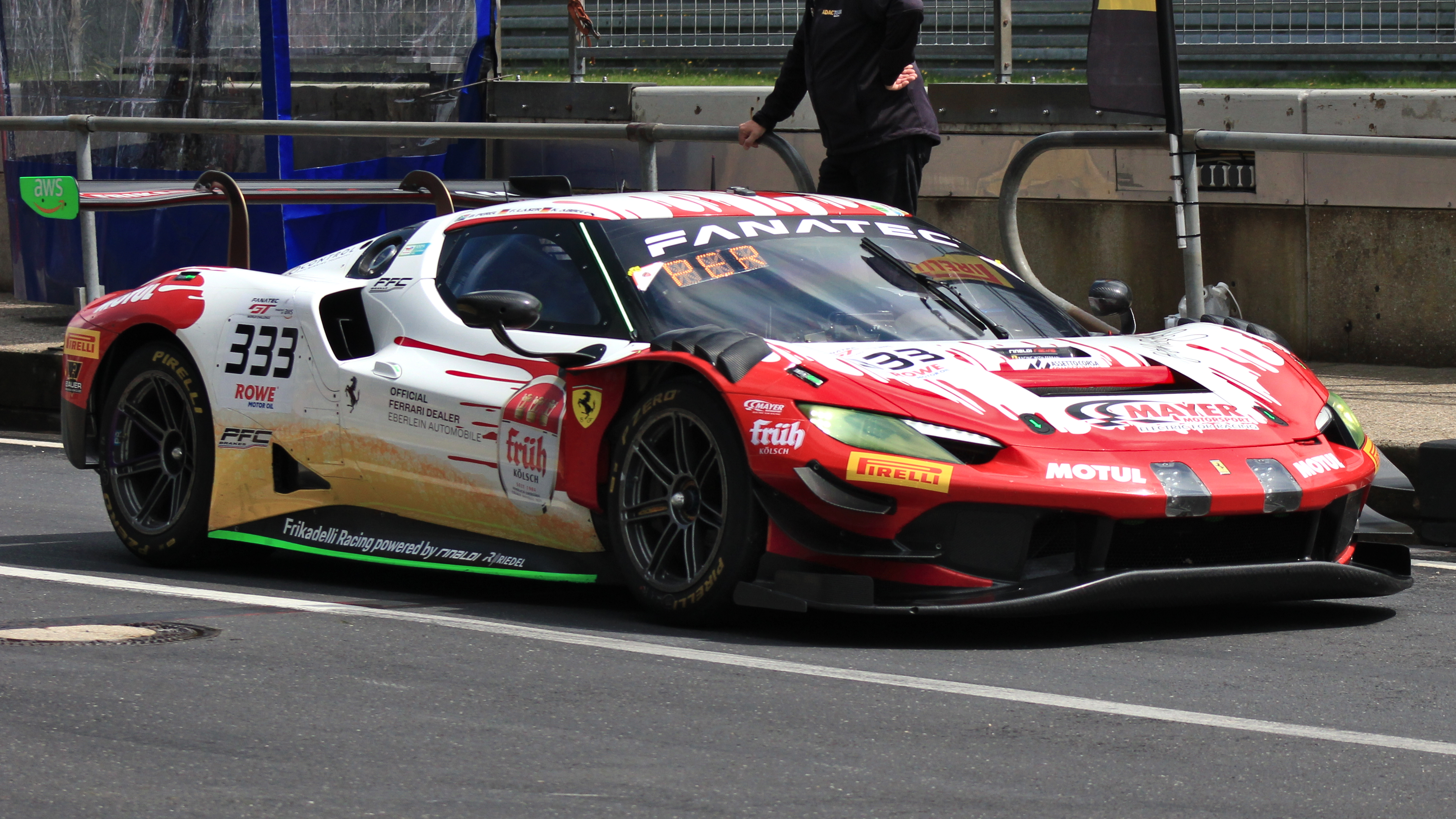
Frikadelli Racing's Ferrari 296 GT3 at the Nürburgring in 2024.

Abbelen owns and is the co-founder of Eifel-based sports car racing team Frikadelli Racing. He and his wife Sabine Schmitz founded the team together in 2005 and were partners in the operation until Schmitz's death in 2021.

One of Frikadelli Racing's most notable achievements came in 2023, when the team scored a breakthrough victory at the 2023 24 Hours of Nürburgring with a Ferrari 296 GT3, driven by Earl Bamber, Nicky Catsburg, Felipe Fernández Laser, and David Pittard. It was the first victory in the event for Ferrari, and the first for a non-German manufacturer since 2002, when Zakspeed won the event with a Chrysler Viper GTS-R.

The team occasionally competes outside of the Nürburgring. They competed in the 2020 24 Hours of Spa, and planned to participate again in 2021 but withdrew because of the 2021 European floods.

== Career summary ==
=== Complete 24 Hours of Nürburgring results ===
| Year | Team | Co-Drivers | Car | Class | Laps | Pos. | Class Pos. |
|---|---|---|---|---|---|---|---|
| 2002 | | (Germany) Edgar Dören (Germany) Karl-Christian Lück (Germany) Ernst-Paul Wawer | Porsche 996 | A7 | 128 | DNF | DNF |
| 2002 | Besaplast Gate Keeper | (Croatia) Franjo Kovac (Denmark) Kurt Thiim (United States) Bobby Carradine | Porsche 996 | A7 | 35 | DNF | DNF |
| 2005 | | (Germany) Wolfgang Destrée (Germany) Kersten Jodexnis (Germany) Marco Merten | Porsche 996 | A7 | 33 | DNF | DNF |
| 2005 | | (Germany) Uwe Reich (Germany) Michael Prym (Germany) Karl-Christian Lück | Porsche 996 | A7 | 25 | DNF | DNF |
| 2006 | | (Germany) Sabine Schmitz (Germany) Andy Bovensiepen (Germany) Heinz Dieter Schornstein | Porsche 911 GT3 R | SP7 | 87 | DNF | DNF |
| 2007 | (Germany) Manthey Racing | (Germany) Sabine Schmitz (Germany) Edgar Althoff | Porsche 911 GT3 R | SP7 | 47 | DNF | DNF |
| 2008 | | (Germany) Sabine Schmitz (Germany) Edgar Viersen (Germany) Kenneth Heyer | Porsche 911 GT3 R | SP7 | 145 | **3rd** | **3rd** |
| 2009 | (Germany) Frikadelli Racing Team | (Germany) Sabine Schmitz (Germany) Edgar Althoff (Germany) Kenneth Heyer | Porsche 911 GT3 R | SP7 | 149 | 6th | **2nd** |
| 2010 | (Germany) Frikadelli Racing Team | (Germany) Sabine Schmitz (Germany) Edgar Althoff (Germany) Dieter Schornstein Jr. | Porsche 911 GT3 R | SP7 | 122 | DNF | DNF |
| 2011 | | (Germany) Sabine Schmitz (Germany) Tim Bergmeister (Germany) Niclas Kentenich | Porsche 911 GT3 R | SP9 GT3 | 152 | 9th | 6th |
| 2012 | | (Germany) Sabine Schmitz (Netherlands) Patrick Huisman (Germany) Christopher Brück | Porsche 911 GT3 R | SP9 GT3 | 151 | 6th | 6th |
| 2013 | | (Germany) Sabine Schmitz (Netherlands) Patrick Huisman (France) Patrick Pilet | Porsche 911 GT3 R | SP9 GT3 | 84 | 16th | 12th |
| 2014 | (Germany) Frikadelli Racing Team | (Germany) Sabine Schmitz (Netherlands) Patrick Huisman (France) Patrick Pilet | Porsche 911 GT3 R | SP9 GT3 | 41 | NC | NC |
| 2015 | (Germany) Frikadelli Racing Team | (Germany) Frank Kräling (Monaco) Marc Gindorf (United States) Connor De Phillippi | Porsche GT Cup America | SP7 | 143 | 19th | **2nd** |
| 2016 | (Germany) Frikadelli Racing Team | (Germany) Sabine Schmitz (Netherlands) Patrick Huisman (Austria) Norbert Siedler | Porsche 911 GT3 R | SP9 | 50 | DNF | DNF |
| 2017 | (Germany) Frikadelli Racing Team | (Germany) Sabine Schmitz (Germany) Andreas Ziegler (Germany) Alex Müller | Porsche 911 GT3 R | SP9 | 152 | 16th | 15th |
| 2019 | (Germany) Frikadelli Racing Team | (Germany) Alex Müller (Germany) Robert Renauer (Austria) Thomas Preining | Porsche 911 GT3 R | SP9 Pro-Am | 135 | DNF | DNF |
| 2020 | (Germany) Frikadelli Racing Team | (Germany) Alex Müller (Germany) Robert Renauer (Austria) Norbert Siedler | Porsche 911 GT3 R | SP9 Pro-Am | 81 | NC | NC |
| 2022 | (Germany) Frikadelli Racing Team | (Germany) Hendrik von Danwitz (Turkey) Ayhancan Güven (United Kingdom) Julian Harrison | Porsche 992 GT3 Cup | Cup2 | 62 | DNF | DNF |

=== Complete FIA GT Series results ===
(key) (Races in bold indicate pole position) (Races in italics indicate fastest lap)

| Year | Team | 1 | 2 | 3 | 4 | 5 | 6 | 7 | 8 | 9 | 10 | 11 | 12 | 13 | Pos | Points |
|---|---|---|---|---|---|---|---|---|---|---|---|---|---|---|---|---|
| 2003 | Zwaan's Racing | BAR; 7 | MAG; Ret | PER; 8 | BRN; 10 | DON; DSQ | SPA6; Ret | SPA12; Ret | SPA24; Ret | AND; 6 | OSC; 5 | EST; 5 | MON; Ret | | 19th | 14 |
| 2004 | Zwaans GTR Racing Team | MON; Ret | VAL; 19 | MAG; 11 | HOC; Ret | BRN; Ret | DON | SPA6 | SPA12 | SPA24 | IMO | OSC | DUB | ZHU | NC | 0 |

=== Complete 24 Hours of Spa results ===
| Year | Team | Co-Drivers | Car | Class | Laps | Pos. | Class Pos. |
|---|---|---|---|---|---|---|---|
| 2003 | Zwaan's Racing | (Netherlands) Arjan van der Zwaan (Netherlands) Rob van der Zwaan (Belgium) Marc Goossens | Chrysler Viper GTS-R | GT | 17 | DNF | DNF |

=== Complete Porsche Supercup results ===
(key) (Races in bold indicate pole position) (Races in italics indicate fastest lap)

| Year | Team | 1 | 2 | 3 | 4 | 5 | 6 | 7 | 8 | 9 | 10 | 11 | 12 | 13 | Pos | Points |
|---|---|---|---|---|---|---|---|---|---|---|---|---|---|---|---|---|
| 2003 | DeWalt Racing/PZRO-JAM | IMO | CAT | A1R | MON; Ret | NÜR | MAG | SIL | HOC | HUN | MZA | IND1 | IND2 | | NC | 0 |
| 2005 | Konrad Motorsport | BHR | IMO | CAT | MON | NÜR | IND1; 10 | IND2; 10 | MAG; Ret | SIL; 15 | HOC; 12 | HUN; 13 | MZA; 15 | SPA; 18 | 13th | 43 |
| 2006 | Harders Plaza Racing | BHR | IMO | NÜR | CAT | MON | SIL | IND1 | IND2 | MAG | HOC | HUN; Ret | MZA | | NC | 0 |

=== Complete 24 Hours of Daytona results ===
| Year | Team | Co-Drivers | Car | Class | Laps | Pos. | Class Pos. |
|---|---|---|---|---|---|---|---|
| 2016 | (Germany) Frikadelli Racing Team | (Netherlands) Patrick Huisman (Germany) Frank Stippler (Germany) Sabine Schmitz (Germany) Sven Müller | Porsche 911 GT3 R | GTD | 698 | 27th | 12th |

=== Complete Le Mans Cup results ===
(key) (Races in bold indicate pole position) (Races in italics indicate fastest lap)

| Year | Team | 1 | 2 | 3 | 4 | 5 | 6 | 7 | Pos | Points |
|---|---|---|---|---|---|---|---|---|---|---|
| 2021 | Frikadelli Racing Team | BAR | LEC | MNZ; Ret | LMS1; 13 | LMS2; 17 | SPA; 15 | POR | 35th | 1.5 |
| 2022 | Frikadelli Racing Team | LEC; 23 | IMO; Ret | LMS1; 23 | LMS2; Ret | MNZ; 10 | SPA | POR; 11 | 37th | 1 |
| 2023 | Frikadelli Racing Team | BAR; 8 | LMS1; 12 | LMS2; 26 | LEC; Ret | ARA; 16 | SPA | POR | 23rd | 4 |

=== Complete Prototype Cup Germany results ===
(key) (Races in bold indicate pole position) (Races in italics indicate fastest lap)

| Year | Team | 1 | 2 | 3 | 4 | 5 | 6 | 7 | 8 | 9 | 10 | 11 | 12 | 13 | 14 | Pos | Points |
|---|---|---|---|---|---|---|---|---|---|---|---|---|---|---|---|---|---|
| 2022 | Frikadelli Racing Team | SPA; 1 | SPA; 2 | NUR; 1; 3 | NUR; 2; 7 | LAU; 1 | LAU; 2 | HOC; 1 | HOC; 2 | | | | | | | NC | 0 |
| 2023 | Frikadelli Racing Team | HOC; 1 | HOC; 1 | OSC; 1 | OSC; 2 | ZAN; 1 | ZAN; 2 | NOR; 1 | NOR; 2 | ASS; 1 | ASS; 2 | NUR; 1; 11 | NUR; 2; 6 | | | NC | 0 |
| 2024 | Frikadelli Racing Team | SPA; 1 C | SPA; 2 C | LAU; 1; 6 | LAU; 2; 5 | LAU; 3; 4 | ZAN; 1; 8 | ZAN; 2; 2 | HOC; 1; 4 | HOC; 2; 6 | HOC; 3; 1 | NUR; 1; 5 | NUR; 2; 9 | SAC; 1 Ret | SAC; 2; 4 | 5th | 149 |

=== VLN / Nürburgring Langstrecken-Serie results summary ===
| Season | Series | Team | Races | Wins | Poles | F/Laps | Podiums | Points | Position |
|---|---|---|---|---|---|---|---|---|---|
| 2006 | VLN Series | | 8 | 0 | 0 | 0 | 0 | ? | ? |
| 2009 | VLN Series | | 10 | 0 | 0 | 0 | 0 | ? | ? |
| 2013 | VLN Series — SP9 | | 8 | 1 | 1 | 1 | 5 | ? | ? |
| 2014 | VLN Series — SP9 | Frikadelli Racing Team | 9 | 3 | 1 | 2 | 5 | 53.43 | **2nd** |
| 2015 | VLN Series — SP9 | Frikadelli Racing Team | 9 | 1 | 1 | 3 | 4 | 14.76 | ? |
| 2016 | VLN Series — SP9 | Frikadelli Racing Team | 6 | 0 | 0 | 0 | 0 | ? | ? |
| 2017 | VLN Series — SP9 Pro-Am / SP9 GT3 | Frikadelli Racing Team | 9 | 1 | 1 | 1 | 6 | ? | ? |
| 2018 | VLN Series — SP9 Pro / SP9 Pre | Frikadelli Racing Team | 7 | 1 | 1 | 2 | 2 | 9.25 | 38th |
| 2019 | VLN Series — SP9 Pro | Frikadelli Racing Team | 2 | 0 | 0 | 0 | 0 | 9.32 | 37th |
| 2020 | Nürburgring Langstrecken-Serie — SP9 Pro-Am | Frikadelli Racing Team | 4 | 2 | 1 | 2 | 3 | 19.58 | 4th |
| 2021 | Nürburgring Langstrecken-Serie — SP9 Pro-Am | Frikadelli Racing Team | 5 | 1 | 2 | 1 | 4 | 28.01 | **3rd** |
| 2023 | Nürburgring Langstrecken-Serie — SP9 Pro-Am | Frikadelli Racing Team | 2 | 0 | 0 | 0 | 0 | 0 | NC |
| 2025 | Nürburgring Langstrecken-Serie — SP9 Am | Frikadelli Racing Team | 3 | 0 | 0 | 0 | 1 | 0 | NC |

=== Other racing results summary ===
| Season | Series | Team | Races | Wins | Poles | F/Laps | Podiums | Points | Position |
|---|---|---|---|---|---|---|---|---|---|
| 1999 | Ferrari Porsche Challenge | | ? | ? | ? | ? | ? | 192 | **2nd** |
| 2001 | Euro GT Series | | 15 | 5 | 4 | 0 | 7 | ? | **1st** |
| 2002 | Euro GT Series | | 14 | 2 | 0 | 0 | 6 | 138 | **3rd** |
| 2003 | French GT Championship | | 2 | 0 | 0 | 0 | 0 | 9 | 41st |
| 2003 | Euro GT Series | | 2 | 0 | 0 | 0 | 0 | 0 | NC |
| 2004 | Le Mans Endurance Series | Konrad Motorsport | 1 | 0 | 0 | 0 | 0 | 0 | NC |
| 2011 | Porsche Carrera Cup Germany | Konrad Motorsport | 1 | 0 | 0 | 0 | 0 | 0 | NC |
| 2015 | Porsche Carrera Cup Germany — Class B | Konrad Motorsport | 2 | 0 | 0 | 0 | 1 | 16 | 5th |
| 2016 | IMSA SportsCar Championship — GTD | Frikadelli Racing Team | 1 | 0 | 0 | 0 | 0 | 1 | 65th |
| 2019 | 24H GT Series — A6 Pro | Frikadelli Racing Team | 1 | 0 | 0 | 0 | 0 | 0 | NC |
| 2019 | ADAC GT Masters | Frikadelli Racing Team | 2 | 0 | 0 | 0 | 0 | 0 | NC |
| 2019 | International GT Open | Frikadelli Racing Team | 2 | 0 | 0 | 0 | 0 | 0 | NC |
| 2021 | GT Winter Series | Frikadelli Racing Team | 3 | 2 | 0 | 3 | 3 | 44 | 14th |
| 2023 | Porsche Endurance Trophy Nürburgring — CUP2 | Frikadelli Racing Team | 7 | 0 | 3 | 0 | 0 | 81.5 | 12th |
| 2024 | GT World Challenge Europe Endurance Cup — Bronze Cup | Frikadelli Racing Team | 1 | 0 | 0 | 0 | 0 | 4 | 38th |
