= 2014 VLN Series =

Motorsport season

Seasons
- ← 2013 2015 →

The 2014 VLN Series was the 37th season of the VLN.

The drivers championship was won by Rolf Derscheid and Michael Flehmer, driving a BMW 325i for Derscheid Motorsport.

== Calendar ==
Rnd.	Race	Length	Circuit	Date
1	60. ADAC Westfalenfahrt	4 hours	(Germany) Nürburgring Nordschleife	March 29
2	39. DMV 4-Stunden-Rennen	4 hours	(Germany) Nürburgring Nordschleife	April 12
3	56. ADAC ACAS H&R-Cup	4 hours	(Germany) Nürburgring Nordschleife	April 26
4	45. Adenauer ADAC Simfy Trophy	4 hours (Note: The race was scheduled to last four hours, but was red-flagged after 181 minutes following an accident along the Döttinger Höhe. Due to a large amount of debris, it was not restarted.)	(Germany) Nürburgring Nordschleife	May 17
5	54. ADAC Reinoldus-Langstreckenrennen	4 hours (Note: The race was scheduled to last four hours, but numerous speeding penalties had to be dealt with after timed pracitice. This pushed back the start of the race by two hours, and it was flagged after 165 minutes.)	(Germany) Nürburgring Nordschleife	July 5
6	37. RCM DMV Grenzlandrennen	4 hours	(Germany) Nürburgring Nordschleife	August 2
7	Opel 6h ADAC Ruhr-Pokal-Rennen	6 hours	(Germany) Nürburgring Nordschleife	August 23
8	46. ADAC Barbarossapreis	4 hours	(Germany) Nürburgring Nordschleife	September 13
9	ROWE DMV 250-Meilen-Rennen	4 hours	(Germany) Nürburgring Nordschleife	October 11
10	39. DMV Münsterlandpokal	4 hours (Note: The race was red-flagged after 24 minutes due to fog. It was restarted after the fog cleared, leading to 190 minutes total race time.)	(Germany) Nürburgring Nordschleife	October 25

== Race results ==
Results indicate overall winners only.

Rnd	Circuit	Pole position	Winners
1	(Germany) Nürburgring Nordschleife	No. 5 (Germany) Phoenix Racing	No. 5 (Germany) Phoenix Racing
1	(Germany) Nürburgring Nordschleife	(Germany) Marc Basseng (Germany) Frank Stippler (Belgium) Laurens Vanthoor	(Germany) Marc Basseng (Germany) Frank Stippler (Belgium) Laurens Vanthoor
2	(Germany) Nürburgring Nordschleife	No. 7 (Germany) Rowe Racing	No. 30 (Germany) Frikadelli Racing
2	(Germany) Nürburgring Nordschleife	(Germany) Michael Zehe (Germany) Christian Hohenadel (Germany) Nico Bastian	(Germany) Klaus Abbelen (Germany) Sabine Schmitz (Netherlands) Patrick Huisman (France) Patrick Pilet
3	(Germany) Nürburgring Nordschleife	No. 23 (United Kingdom) Nissan GT Academy Team RJN	No. 26 (Belgium) Team Marc VDS
3	(Germany) Nürburgring Nordschleife	(United Kingdom) Alex Buncombe (Spain) Lucas Ordóñez (Germany) Florian Strauss	(Netherlands) Nicky Catsburg (Germany) Dirk Adorf
4	(Germany) Nürburgring Nordschleife	No. 3. (Germany) Black Falcon	No. 3. (Germany) Black Falcon
4	(Germany) Nürburgring Nordschleife	(Germany) Lance David Arnold (Sweden) Andreas Simonsen (Germany) Christian Menzel	(Germany) Lance David Arnold (Sweden) Andreas Simonsen (Germany) Christian Menzel
5	(Germany) Nürburgring Nordschleife	No. 777 (Germany) H&R Spezialfedern	No. 30 (Germany) Frikadelli Racing
5	(Germany) Nürburgring Nordschleife	(Germany) Jürgen Alzen (Germany) Dominik Schwager	(Germany) Klaus Abbelen (Germany) Sabine Schmitz (Netherlands) Patrick Huisman (Germany) Frank Stippler
6	(Germany) Nürburgring Nordschleife	No. 20 (Germany) Team Schubert	No. 30 (Germany) Frikadelli Racing
6	(Germany) Nürburgring Nordschleife	(Germany) Max Sandritter (Germany) Thomas Jäger (Austria) Dominik Baumann (Germany) Jens Klingmann	(Germany) Klaus Abbelen (Germany) Sabine Schmitz (Netherlands) Patrick Huisman
7	(Germany) Nürburgring Nordschleife	No. 4 (Germany) Falken Motorsports	No. 6 (Germany) Rowe Racing
7	(Germany) Nürburgring Nordschleife	(United Kingdom) Peter Dumbreck (Switzerland) Alexandre Imperatori	(Germany) Thomas Jäger (Germany) Jan Seyffarth
8	(Germany) Nürburgring Nordschleife	No. 30 (Germany) Frikadelli Racing	Cancelled due to heavy fog
8	(Germany) Nürburgring Nordschleife	(Germany) Klaus Abbelen (Germany) Sabine Schmitz (Netherlands) Patrick Huisman (France) Patrick Pilet	Cancelled due to heavy fog
9	(Germany) Nürburgring Nordschleife	No. 5 (Germany) Phoenix Racing	No. 6 (Germany) Rowe Racing
9	(Germany) Nürburgring Nordschleife	(Germany) Marc Basseng (Germany) Frank Stippler	(Germany) Christian Hohenadel (Germany) Maro Engel
10	(Germany) Nürburgring Nordschleife	No. 117	No. 777 (Germany) H&R Spezialfedern
10	(Germany) Nürburgring Nordschleife	(Finland) Antti Buri (Finland) Kari-Pekka Laaksonen	(Germany) Jürgen Alzen (Germany) Dominik Schwager

== See also ==
- 2014 24 Hours of Nürburgring

== Bibliography ==
- Jörg Hildebrand & Hasso Jacoby. Grüne Hölle 2014: Die Langstreckenrennen auf dem Nürburgring (in German). Hackethal Verlag. ISBN 978-3-936285-42-0.
