= 2009 VLN Series =

Motorsport season

Seasons
- ← 2008 2010 →

The 2009 BFGoodrich Langstreckenmeisterschaft (BFGLM) season was the 32nd season of the VLN.

The drivers championship was won by Alexander Böhm, Sean Paul Breslin and Christer Jöns, driving a BMW 325i for Black Falcon.

== Calendar ==
Rnd.	Race	Length	Circuit	Date
1	56. ADAC Westfalenfahrt	4 hours	(Germany) Nürburgring Nordschleife	April 4
2	34. DMV 4-Stunden-Rennen	4 hours	(Germany) Nürburgring Nordschleife	April 18
3	51. ADAC ACAS H&R-Cup	4 hours	(Germany) Nürburgring Nordschleife	May 2
4	40. Adenauer ADAC Rundstrecken-Trophy	4 hours	(Germany) Nürburgring Nordschleife	June 13
5	49. ADAC Reinoldus-Langstreckenrennen	4 hours	(Germany) Nürburgring Nordschleife	June 27
6	6h ADAC Ruhr-Pokal-Rennen	6 hours	(Germany) Nürburgring Nordschleife	July 18
7	32. RCM DMV Grenzlandrennen	4 hours	(Germany) Nürburgring Nordschleife	August 29
8	41. ADAC Barbarossapreis	4 hours	(Germany) Nürburgring Nordschleife	October 3
9	33. DMV 250-Meilen-Rennen	4 hours	(Germany) Nürburgring Nordschleife	October 17
10	34. DMV Münsterlandpokal	4 hours	(Germany) Nürburgring Nordschleife	October 31

== Race results ==
Results indicate overall winners only.

Rnd	Circuit	Pole position	Winners
1	(Germany) Nürburgring Nordschleife	No. 122 Land Motorsport	No. 117 Manthey Racing
1	(Germany) Nürburgring Nordschleife	(Germany) Toto Wolff (Sweden) Mattias Ekström (Germany) Marc Basseng	(Germany) Marcel Tiemann (Germany) Timo Bernhard
2	(Germany) Nürburgring Nordschleife	No. 76 Mamerow Racing	No. 76 Mamerow Racing
2	(Germany) Nürburgring Nordschleife	(Germany) Christian Mamerow (Germany) Lance David Arnold	(Germany) Christian Mamerow (Germany) Lance David Arnold
3	(Germany) Nürburgring Nordschleife	No. 117 Manthey Racing	No. 117 Manthey Racing
3	(Germany) Nürburgring Nordschleife	(Germany) Marcel Tiemann (Germany) Marc Lieb	(Germany) Marcel Tiemann (Germany) Marc Lieb
4	(Germany) Nürburgring Nordschleife	No. 73 Mühlner Motorsport	No. 117 Manthey Racing
4	(Germany) Nürburgring Nordschleife	(Germany) Oliver Kainz (Germany) Marc Basseng	(Germany) Marcel Tiemann (Germany) Arno Klasen
5	(Germany) Nürburgring Nordschleife	No. 85 Raeder Automotive	No. 80 Phoenix Racing
5	(Germany) Nürburgring Nordschleife	(Germany) Hermann Tilke (Germany) Dirk Adorf	(Germany) Hans-Joachim Stuck (Germany) Marc Basseng (Germany) Frank Biela
6	(Germany) Nürburgring Nordschleife	No. 85 Raeder Automotive	No. 117 Manthey Racing
6	(Germany) Nürburgring Nordschleife	(Germany) Hermann Tilke (Germany) Dirk Adorf (Germany) Thomas Mutsch	(Germany) Marcel Tiemann (Germany) Marc Lieb (Germany) Arno Klasen
7	(Germany) Nürburgring Nordschleife	No. 76 Mamerow Racing	No. 117 Manthey Racing
7	(Germany) Nürburgring Nordschleife	(Germany) Christian Mamerow	(Germany) Marcel Tiemann (Germany) Marc Lieb (Germany) Arno Klasen
8	(Germany) Nürburgring Nordschleife	No. 116 Team Manthey	No. 76 Mamerow Racing
8	(Germany) Nürburgring Nordschleife	(Germany) Georg Weiss (Germany) Michael Jacobs (Germany) Marcel Tiemann	(Germany) Christian Mamerow (Germany) Dirk Werner
9	(Germany) Nürburgring Nordschleife	No. 85 Raeder Automotive	No. 76 Mamerow Racing
9	(Germany) Nürburgring Nordschleife	(Germany) Hermann Tilke (Germany) Dirk Adorf	(Germany) Christian Mamerow (Germany) Dirk Werner
10	(Germany) Nürburgring Nordschleife	No. 76 Mamerow Racing	No. 76 Mamerow Racing
10	(Germany) Nürburgring Nordschleife	(Germany) Christian Mamerow (Germany) Dirk Werner	(Germany) Christian Mamerow (Germany) Dirk Werner

== See also ==
- 2009 24 Hours of Nürburgring

== Bibliography ==
- Jörg Hildebrand, Hasso Jacoby & Wolfgang Sievernich. Grüne Hölle 2009: Die Langstreckenrennen auf dem Nürburgring (in German). Hackethal Verlag. ISBN 978-3936285345.
