= H&R =

H&R may refer to:

- H&R Block, a tax preparation company
- H&R Firearms, a firearm manufacturer
- H&R (company), a German automotive suspension manufacturer
- H&R REIT, a Canadian real estate investment trust
