= 2015 VLN Series =

Motorsport season

Seasons
- ← 2014 2016 →

The 2015 VLN Series was the 38th season of the VLN.

The drivers championship was won by Dirk Groneck and Tim Groneck, driving a Renault Clio for Groneck Motorsport.

A fatal accident occurred during the opening round of the season, claiming the life of 49-year-old Dutch spectator Andy Gehrmann and injuring nine other spectators. The No. 23 Nissan GT-R Nismo GT3 of Jann Mardenborough unexpectedly took off at the Flugplatz, hit the barrier and bounced over the catch fencing, into the crowd.

== Calendar ==
Rnd.	Race	Length	Circuit	Date
1	61. ADAC Westfalenfahrt	4 hours (Note: The race was red-flagged after 48 minutes following the accident that ultimately claimed the life of Andy Gehrmann. It was not restarted.)	(Germany) Nürburgring Nordschleife	March 28
2	40. DMV 4-Stunden-Rennen	4 hours	(Germany) Nürburgring Nordschleife	April 25
3	57. ADAC ACAS H&R-Cup	4 hours	(Germany) Nürburgring Nordschleife	June 20
4	46. Adenauer ADAC Worldpeace Trophy	4 hours	(Germany) Nürburgring Nordschleife	July 4
5	47. ADAC Barbarossapreis	4 hours	(Germany) Nürburgring Nordschleife	August 1
6	38. RCM DMV Grenzlandrennen	4 hours	(Germany) Nürburgring Nordschleife	August 22
7	Opel 6h ADAC Ruhr-Pokal-Rennen	6 hours	(Germany) Nürburgring Nordschleife	September 5
8	55. ADAC Reinoldus-Langstreckenrennen	4 hours	(Germany) Nürburgring Nordschleife	October 3
9	ROWE DMV 250-Meilen-Rennen	4 hours	(Germany) Nürburgring Nordschleife	October 17
10	40. DMV Münsterlandpokal	4 hours (Note: The start of the race was delayed due to heavy fog. Once the fog cleared, the race began at 1:50 pm with a three-hour time limit. However, the fog worsened 11 minutes before the end and the race was stopped early.)	(Germany) Nürburgring Nordschleife	October 31

== Race results ==
Results indicate overall winners only.

Rnd	Circuit	Pole position	Winners
1	(Germany) Nürburgring Nordschleife	No. 6 (Germany) Rowe Racing	No. 6 (Germany) Rowe Racing
1	(Germany) Nürburgring Nordschleife	(Germany) Maro Engel (Germany) Jan Seyffarth (Netherlands) Renger van der Zande	(Germany) Maro Engel (Germany) Jan Seyffarth (Netherlands) Renger van der Zande
2	(Germany) Nürburgring Nordschleife	No. 28 (United Kingdom) Bentley Motorsport	No. 10 (Belgium) Audi Sport Team WRT
2	(Germany) Nürburgring Nordschleife	(Germany) Lance David Arnold (Germany) Christian Menzel (United Kingdom) Guy Smith	(Germany) Christopher Mies (Switzerland) Nico Müller
3	(Germany) Nürburgring Nordschleife	No. 30 (Germany) Frikadelli Racing Team	No. 30 (Germany) Frikadelli Racing Team
3	(Germany) Nürburgring Nordschleife	(Germany) Klaus Abbelen (Netherlands) Patrick Huisman (Germany) Sabine Schmitz	(Germany) Klaus Abbelen (Netherlands) Patrick Huisman (Germany) Sabine Schmitz
4	(Germany) Nürburgring Nordschleife	No. 16 (Germany) Mercedes-AMG Test Team	No. 36 (Germany) Walkenhorst Motorsport
4	(Germany) Nürburgring Nordschleife	(Germany) Bernd Schneider (Germany) Thomas Jäger (Germany) Jan Seyffarth	(Italy) Michela Cerruti (Germany) Felipe Fernández Laser (Finland) Jesse Krohn
5	(Germany) Nürburgring Nordschleife	No. 777 (Germany) H&R Spezialfedern	No. 777 (Germany) H&R Spezialfedern
5	(Germany) Nürburgring Nordschleife	(Germany) Uwe Alzen (Germany) Dominik Schwager	(Germany) Uwe Alzen (Germany) Dominik Schwager
6	(Germany) Nürburgring Nordschleife	No. 7 (Germany) Rowe Racing	No. 7 (Germany) Rowe Racing
6	(Germany) Nürburgring Nordschleife	(Germany) Klaus Graf (Germany) Christian Hohenadel	(Germany) Klaus Graf (Germany) Christian Hohenadel
7	(Germany) Nürburgring Nordschleife	No. 55 (Germany) Farnbacher Racing	No. 2 (Germany) Black Falcon
7	(Germany) Nürburgring Nordschleife	(Germany) Dominik Farnbacher (Germany) Mario Farnbacher (Japan) Hiroki Yoshimoto	(Germany) Hubert Haupt (Saudi Arabia) Abdulaziz bin Turki Al Saud (United Kingdom) Adam Christodoulou (Netherlands) Yelmer Buurman
8	(Germany) Nürburgring Nordschleife	No. 16 (Germany) Mercedes-AMG Test Team	No. 44 (Germany) Twin Busch Motorsport
8	(Germany) Nürburgring Nordschleife	(Germany) Thomas Jäger (Germany) Jan Seyffarth (Netherlands) Yelmer Buurman	(Germany) Marc Busch (Germany) Dennis Busch
9	(Germany) Nürburgring Nordschleife	No. 2 (Germany) Black Falcon	No. 2 (Germany) Black Falcon
9	(Germany) Nürburgring Nordschleife	(Germany) Hubert Haupt (Switzerland) Manuel Metzger (Netherlands) Yelmer Buurman (United Kingdom) Adam Christodoulou	(Germany) Hubert Haupt (Switzerland) Manuel Metzger (Netherlands) Yelmer Buurman (United Kingdom) Adam Christodoulou
10	(Germany) Nürburgring Nordschleife	No. 36 (Germany) Walkenhorst Motorsport	No. 56 (Germany) Black Falcon
10	(Germany) Nürburgring Nordschleife	(Finland) Jesse Krohn (Sweden) Victor Bouveng	(Netherlands) "Gerwin" (Switzerland) Manuel Metzger (Austria) Philipp Eng

== See also ==
- 2015 24 Hours of Nürburgring

== Bibliography ==
- Jörg Hildebrand & Hasso Jacoby. Grüne Hölle 2015: Die Langstreckenrennen auf dem Nürburgring (in German). Weiss Verlag. ISBN 978-3-923632-21-3.
