= Hermann Tilke =

German engineer, racing driver and F1 circuit designer

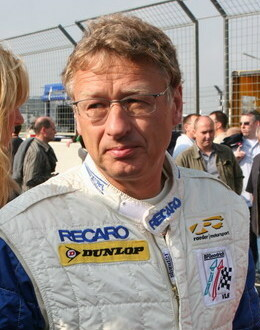
- Tilke in 2009
- Born: Hermann Hugo Tilke; 31 December 1954 (age 71); Olpe, Germany
- Occupations: Engineer; racing driver; circuit designer
- Children: Carsten Tilke
- Website: tilke.de

Hermann Hugo Tilke (born 31 December 1954) is a German engineer, racing driver and circuit designer, who has designed numerous Formula One and MotoGP circuits.

== Racing ==
During the 1980s, Tilke competed in touring car racing, mainly on the old Nürburgring Nordschleife circuit. He also competed in VLN endurance racing and the 24 Hours Nürburgring. He and Dirk Adorf won some VLN races with a V8Star Series in 2003 and 2004.

Tilke also raced in the 2002 and 2003 Bathurst 24 Hour races at the famous Mount Panorama Circuit in Australia. He placed 14th outright and third in Class 9 driving a Honda S2000 for the races promotor Ross Palmer alongside Peter Hansen and Australian female racer Melinda Price. Tilke returned to The Mountain in 2003 with British GT team Cirtek Motorsport in a Porsche 996 GT3-RS alongside Melinda Price and British drivers Tim Harvey and Jonathan Rowland, but their race ended with engine failure just before dawn on the Sunday morning (the race started on Saturday at 2 PM local time) after completing 325 laps of the 6.213 km (3.861 mi) road circuit (the race winning Holden Monaro 427C covered 527 laps).

== Civil engineering ==
After completing his civil engineering degree with specialization in transport and traffic management at Fachhochschule Aachen, Tilke established Tilke Engineering in 1984, combining skills in architecture, civil engineering and electronic engineering to provide complete solutions for motor racing and waste disposal projects.

=== Formula One ===
Tilke is one of four designers recognised by the FIA but has, with the exception of the Silverstone redesign in 2010, been the only designer to be commissioned to design Formula One tracks. One of his first minor tasks was to design and build a short access road at the Nürburgring, earned due to contacts made by his racing efforts there. His first major job was the transformation of the fast Österreichring to the much shorter A1-Ring in the 1990s.

Tilke was involved in the radical overhauls of European circuits such as the Hockenheimring, Circuit de Catalunya and Nürburgring, as well as Fuji Speedway in Japan.

Tilke secured the contracts to design many high-profile new circuits from scratch, mainly in Asia but also in eastern Europe. He designed Sepang International Circuit, Bahrain International Circuit, Shanghai International Circuit, Istanbul Park Racing Circuit, Valencia Street Circuit, Marina Bay Street Circuit, Yas Marina Circuit, Korea International Circuit and the Buddh International Circuit. Tilke also designed the new Circuit of the Americas in Austin, Texas, where F1 made its return to the United States in 2012. Tilke's latest designs include Sochi Autodrom which hosted its first race in 2014 with the debut of Russia in F1, Kuwait Motor Town which opened officially in 2019, and the Hanoi Street Circuit which was set for an inaugural race in April 2020 but was cancelled due to COVID-19.

Tilke has designed each track with several other engineers from Tilke Engineering, as well as F1's former commercial rights holder Bernie Ecclestone. After viewing the track site and "once factors such as topography, wind direction, infrastructure and soil quality are known" the design work can begin. Tilke focuses on "conceiving dramatic architecture that reflects the host country, like Sepang's lotus-leaf grandstands in Malaysia", while also aiming for spectator comfort and clear viewing. He "build[s] corners that promise a fast and interesting race but avoid pulling the field apart".

In 2025, IFEMA appointed companies in the Tilke group to continue the Madring project after terminating a contract with Dromo Circuit Design, which concerned construction support. In 2026, the Cologne Regional Court granted Dromo interim relief limited to Germany, prohibiting Tilke GmbH & Co. KG and Tilke Verwaltung GmbH from reproducing, in whole or in part, Dromo's protected Madring circuit design or from having third parties carry out those acts. The court recorded that a court-appointed expert had found corresponding Dromo documents stored on the respondents' computer systems as early as February 2025, with later copies including modified versions. It also noted that the separate licence agreement had not been expressly terminated and held, for the purposes of the German interim proceedings, that termination of the contract did not authorise the reproductions at issue. The order was preliminary, applied only in Germany and did not settle the wider contractual dispute in Spain.

== Criticism ==
Tilke's track designs have been the subject of criticism. A 2009 profile in The Guardian noted that Tilke "has been accused of penning boring tracks and, even worse, of butchering legendary ones like Hockenheim." Russian Formula One commentator Alexey Popov coined the term "Tilkedrome" to emphasize the characteristic ennui of tracks designed by Tilke.

Former driver and team owner Jackie Stewart was critical of Tilke in a 2011 piece in The Daily Telegraph, blaming his designs for the lack of overtaking and excitement at many Formula One races, saying they "are largely carbon copies of each other". Stewart, while praising the vast improvement the designs have brought to the sport's safety as well as "bringing fantastic amenities and luxuries to the sport", argued that the tracks have "gone too far the other way" in terms of safety. His primary complaint was that the large tarmac run-off areas fail to "penalise mistakes"; he cited the 2010 Abu Dhabi Grand Prix, where Mark Webber was unable to pass Fernando Alonso, despite the latter running wide on four occasions, because the track's run-off areas did not impede him. Stewart suggested that the run-offs be made of a substance that slowed the cars down and thus punished drivers' mistakes. Webber echoed Stewart's views, stating that he was "spot on". 1980 world champion Alan Jones described Tilke's designs as "just one constant-radius corner after another" and "boring".

Others have defended him. Driver and commentator Anthony Davidson said that Tilke "understands the demands of the modern cars...he gives us run-off areas and it's all well thought out. They are enjoyable to race on because they suit modern F1 cars. At a track like Silverstone you do not get as much overtaking because it was designed for cars that were slower and did not depend on downforce for speed. But the circuits designed in recent years have a long straight and bigger braking zone." He particularly praised Turn Eight of Istanbul Park.

== List of circuits ==
Tilke has secured contracts to design many new circuits.

Key
Highlighting
Colour	Meaning
Blue	Circuit was not developed
Pink	Circuit renovated
Grey	Circuit abandoned

Year	Circuit	Location
1996	(Austria) A1 Ring	Spielberg, Styria, Austria
1999	(Malaysia) Sepang International Circuit	Sepang District, Selangor, Malaysia
2001	(Germany) Sachsenring	Hohenstein-Ernstthal, Saxony, Germany
2002	(Germany) Nürburgring	Nürburg, Rhineland-Palatinate, Germany
2002	(Germany) Hockenheimring	Hockenheim, Baden-Württemberg, Germany
2004	Bahrain International Circuit	Sakhir, Southern Governorate, Bahrain
2004	(Qatar) Lusail International Circuit	Lusail, Al Daayen, Qatar
2004	(China) Shanghai International Circuit	Jiading District, Shanghai, China
2005	(Japan) Fuji Speedway	Oyama, Suntō District, Shizuoka Prefecture, Japan
2005	(Turkey) Istanbul Park	Tuzla, Istanbul, Marmara region, Turkey
2006	(Mexico) Cancún	Cancún, Quintana Roo, Mexico
2006	(China) Jingkai Street Circuit	Yizhuang, Beijing, China
2007	(Spain) Circuit de Barcelona-Catalunya	Montmeló, Catalonia, Spain
2007	(Romania) Bucharest Ring	Bucharest, Romania
2007	(United States) Colorado Motorsports Country Club Circuit	Colorado, United States
2008	(Singapore) Marina Bay Street Circuit	Marina Bay, Singapore
2008	(Latvia) Kandavas Kartodroms	Kandava, Latvia
2008	(Spain) Valencia Street Circuit	Valencia, Spain
2009	(Indonesia) Lippo Village International Formula Circuit	Lippo Karawaci, Tangerang, Banten, Indonesia
2009	(United Arab Emirates) Yas Marina Circuit	Yas Island, Abu Dhabi, United Arab Emirates
2009	(Spain) Ciudad del Motor de Aragón	Alcañiz, Aragon, Spain
2010	(Ukraine) Kyiv Race Track	Kalynivka, Kyiv Oblast, Ukraine
2010	(Republic of Ireland) Dublin Street Circuit	Dublin, Ireland
2010	(South Korea) Korea International Circuit	Yeongam, South Jeolla Province, Honam, South Korea
2010	Kazakhstan Motorcity	Kazakhstan
2010	(United States) Atlanta Motorsports Park	Dawson County, Georgia, United States
2010	(Norway) Oslofjord Panoramic Racepark	Oslofjord, Oslo, Eastern Norway, Norway
2011	(Norway) Rudskogen Motorpark	Rakkestad, Østfold, Norway
2011	(India) Buddh International Circuit	Greater Noida, Uttar Pradesh, India
2012	(Russia) Moscow Raceway	Volokolamsk, Moscow Oblast, Russia
2012	(United States) Circuit of the Americas	Austin, Texas, United States
2012	(Russia) Sibirian Ring	Novosibirsk, Novosibirsk Oblast, Russia
2013	(Ukraine) Crimea Grand Prix Circuit	Suvorovske, Crimea, Ukraine
2013	(United States) Port Imperial Street Circuit	New Jersey, United States
2013	(Chile) Autódromo y Centro Cultural Motorpark	Santiago, Chile
2013	(Germany) Bilster Berg	Bad Driburg, North Rhine-Westphalia, Germany
2014	(Russia) Sochi Autodrom	Sochi, Krasnodar Krai, Russia
2014	(Croatia) Osijek - Tvrđa	Osijek and Tvrđa, Croatia
2014	(Croatia) Bistra - Zagreb	Bistra and Zagreb, Croatia
2014	(Thailand) Chang International Circuit	Buriram, Thailand
2015	(Germany) Mercedes-Benz Arena Temporary Track	Stuttgart, Baden-Württemberg, Germany
2015	(Mexico) Autódromo Hermanos Rodríguez	Mexico City, Mexico
2016	(Canada) Vancouver Island Motorsport Circuit	Duncan, British Columbia, Canada
2016	(Morocco) Circuit International Automobile Moulay El Hassan	Marrakesh, Marrakesh-Safi, Morocco
2016	(Azerbaijan) Baku City Circuit	Azadliq Square, Baku, Azerbaijan
2017	(Indonesia) Jakabaring International Circuit	Palembang, South Sumatra, Indonesia
2017	(Indonesia) Sentul International Circuit	Bogor, West Java, Indonesia
2018	(Philippines) Pradera Verde Racing Circuit	Lubao, Pampanga, Central Luzon, Philippines
2018	(China) V1 Auto World Tianjin	Tianjin, China
2019	Kuwait Motor Town	Ali Sabah Al Salem, Ahmadi Governorate, Kuwait
2019	(Russia) Igora Drive	Priozersk, Leningrad Oblast, Russia
2020	(Vietnam) Hanoi Street Circuit	Nam Từ Liêm, Hanoi, Vietnam
2020	(Indonesia) Jakarta Monument Street Circuit	Jakarta, Indonesia
2021	(Saudi Arabia) Jeddah Corniche Circuit	Jeddah Corniche, Jeddah, Saudi Arabia
2023	(Kazakhstan) Sokol International Racetrack	Sokol, Almaty, Kazakhstan
2023	(United States) Las Vegas Strip Circuit	Las Vegas, Nevada, United States
