= Dirk Adorf =

German race car driver

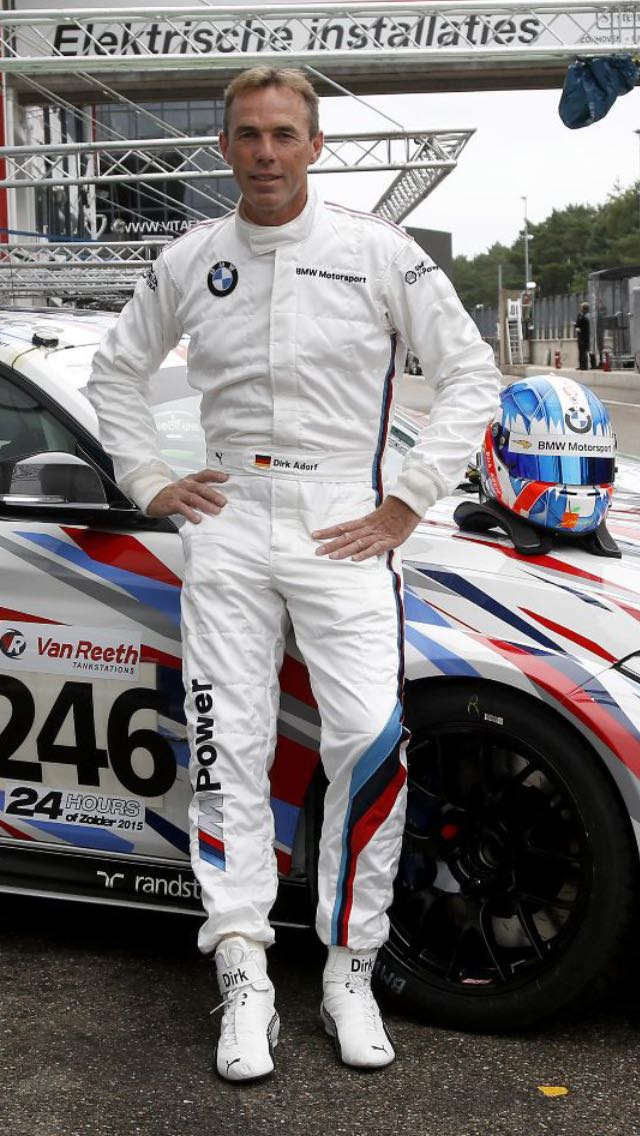
- Adorf in 2016
- Nationality: (Germany) German
- Born: 10 July 1969 (age 57) Altenkirchen, Rhineland-Palatinate, Germany
- Categorisation: FIA Gold (until 2017); FIA Silver (2018–2021); FIA Bronze (2022–)

Dirk Adorf (born 10 July 1969 in Altenkirchen, Rhineland-Palatinate) is a German racing driver. A Nürburgring Nordschleife specialist, he has served as a factory driver for Opel and BMW.

Starting with small cars, Adorf won the Nürburgring VLN German Endurance Trophy in 1992, 1996 and 1997. This earned him drives in the German Super Tourenwagen Cup (STW) during 1995.

Adorf would return to the STW in 1999, this time with Opel. After three seasons in the 2000cc touring car series, he moved to V8Star Series in 2002. His last competition there was in 2003, when he drove two races in V8Star. After the series folded, his team took the big Jaguar-bodied V8Star to the Nürburgring VLN endurance series, and after successfully adopting the car, they won a race in 2003, together with Hermann Tilke.

For 2004, Adorf moved to the Raeder team, winning some more races. Later, he decided to enter a Lamborghini Gallardo, but with little success as the car remained unreliable. The team then acquired a FIA GT3–spec Ford GT from Matech, with which Adorf surprisingly set pole for the 2009 24 Hours of Nürburgring against strong competition.

In 2010, Adorf joined the Schnitzer Motorsport–run BMW works team and looked set for a win on debut at the 2010 24 Hours of Spa, leading by over a lap when a track rod broke and sent Dirk Werner into the barrier in the last hour. The trio eventually salvaged third place.

Adorf continued to race the M3, Z4 and M4 iterations of BMW race cars at the Nürburgring 24 Hours until 2018. He currently serves as a BMW development driver, academy mentor and TV expert.

== Racing record ==
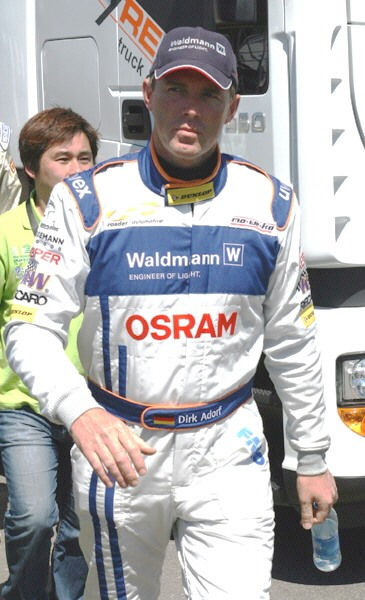
Adorf in 2009, the year he won pole for the Nürburgring 24 Hours.

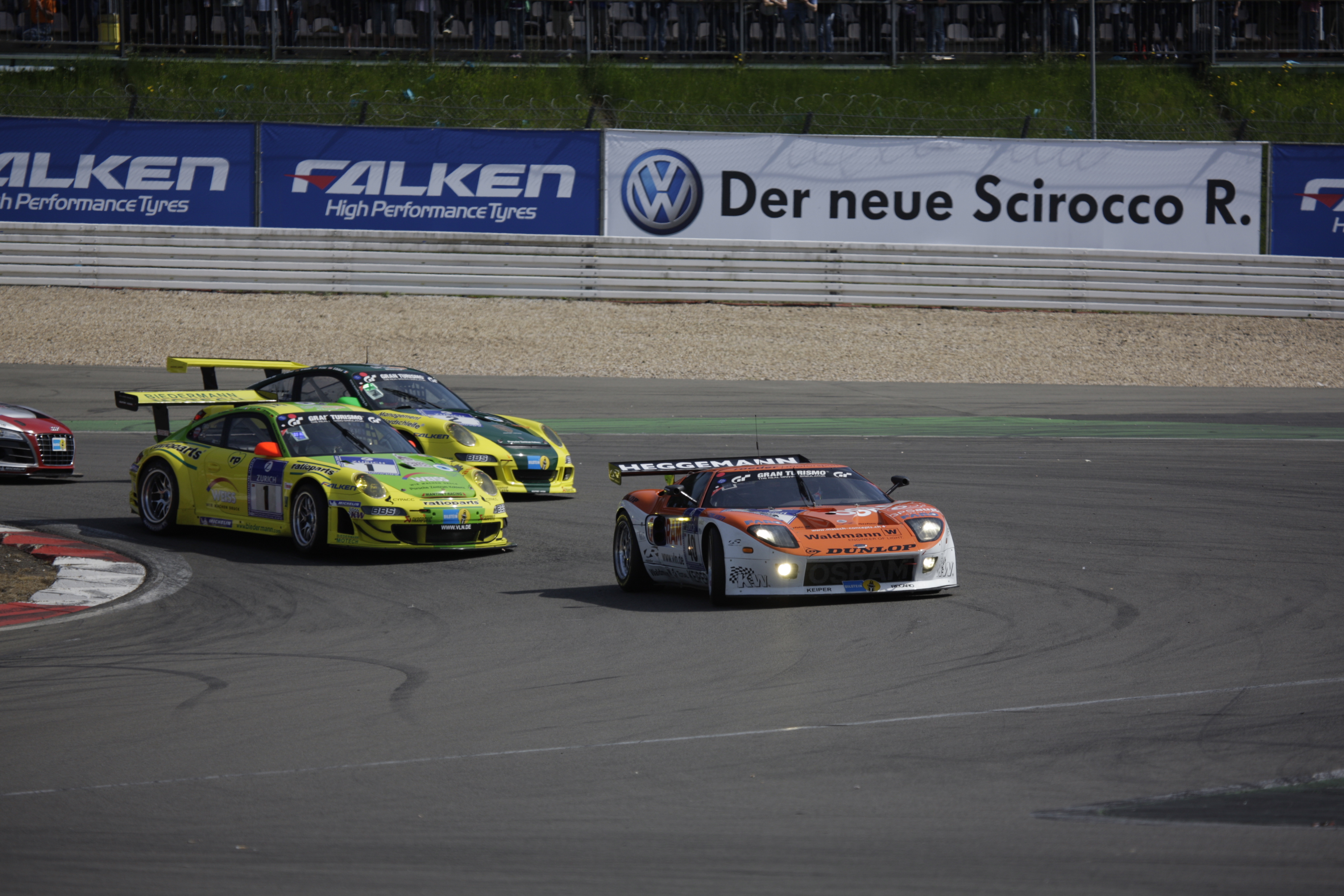
Adorf leading the field from pole position in his Ford GT in 2009.

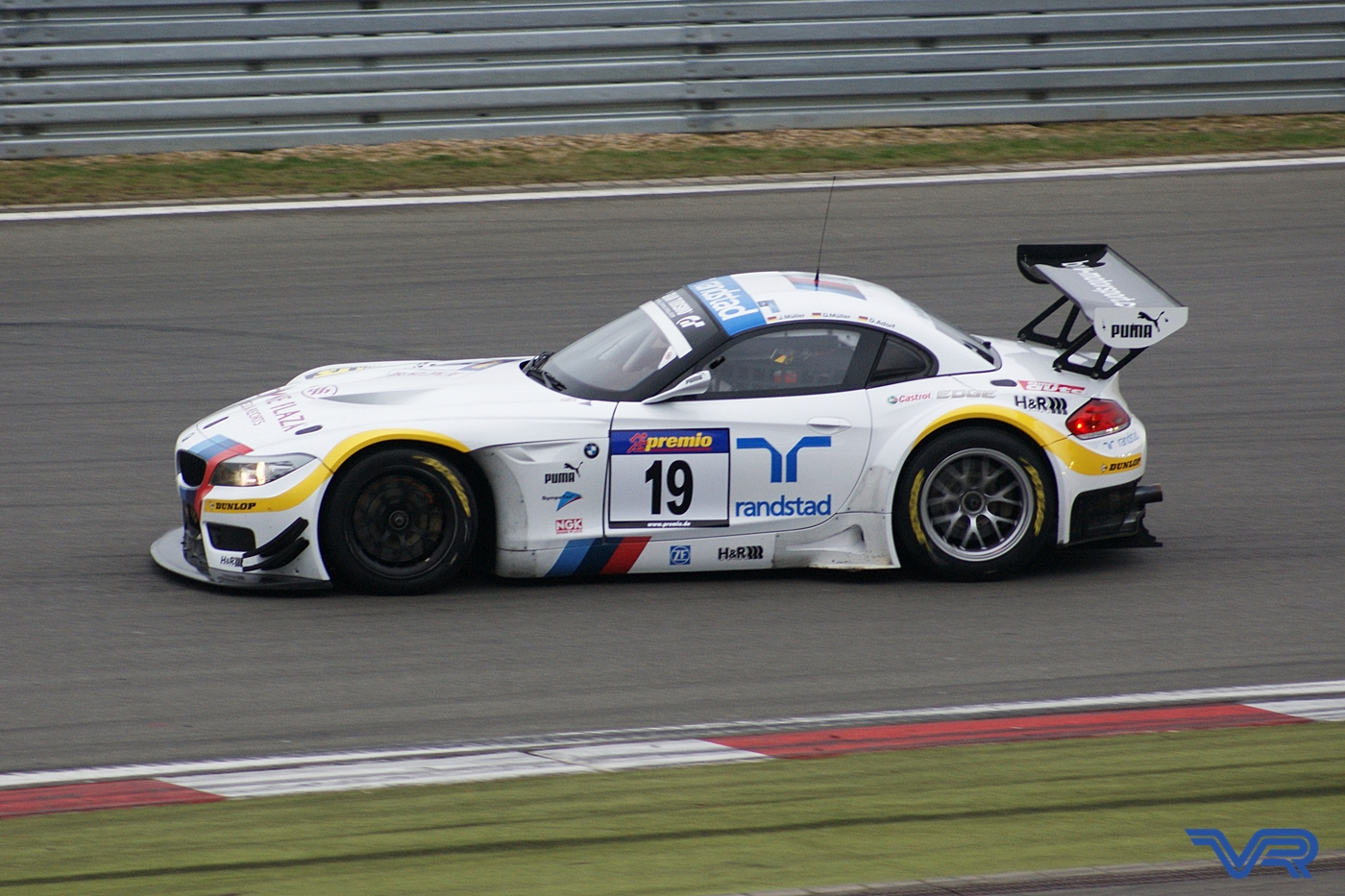
Adorf racing for BMW Team Schubert in the 2012 VLN Series.

=== 24 Hours of Nürburgring ===
Year	Team	Co-Drivers	Car	Class	Laps	Pos.	Class Pos.
1992	(Germany) Renngemeinschaft Sieglar	(Germany) Klaus-Dieter Häckel (Germany) Guido Thierfelder	Citroën AX	Class 17	63	66th	2nd
1993	(Germany) Team Matter Sicherheit	(Austria) Raimund Baumschlager (Germany) Edgar Dören (Germany) Hermann Tilke	Porsche 911 Carrera	Class 1	28	DNF	DNF
1993	(Germany) Renngemeinschaft Sieglar	(Germany) Peter Kröber (Germany) Michael Tanzberger (Germany) Guido Thierfelder	Citroën AX Sport	Class 10	104	97th	7th
1994	(Germany) FINA Tankstellen Team Schneider	(Germany) Markus Gedlich (Germany) Andy Middendorf (Germany) Sabine Schmitz	BMW 325i	Class 3	100	18th	3rd
1995	(Germany) Mühlner Motorsport	(Germany) Marco Munding (Germany) Wolfgang Savelsbergh	Opel Astra GSi	Class 4	117	7th	1st
1996	(Germany) Kissling Motorsport	(Germany) Günther Schmidt (Germany) Volker Strycek (Germany) Klaus-Peter Thaler	Opel Astra	Class 1	94	84th	1st
1996	(Germany) ITT Automotive Europe	(Germany) Marco Werner (Germany) Thomas Winkelhock	Opel Astra GSi	Class 3	126	9th	1st
1997	(Germany) Mühlner Motorsport	(Belgium) Eric Nève (Germany) Peter Oberndorfer (Germany) Volker Strycek	Opel Astra	Class 1	64	DNF	DNF
1999	(Germany) Mühlner Motorsport	(Germany) Heinz-Josef Bermes (Germany) Karl Mauer (Germany) Wolfgang Savelsbergh	Opel Astra G	A3	72	DNF	DNF
1999	(Germany) Mühlner Motorsport	(Germany) Wolfgang Leufgen (Belgium) Eric Nève (Germany) Wolfgang Savelsbergh	Opel Astra G	A3	78	DNF	DNF
2000	(Germany) Mühlner Motorsport	(Germany) Heinz-Josef Bermes (Germany) Christian Menzel (Switzerland) Peter Wyss	Opel Astra	A3	10	DNF	DNF
2000	(Germany) Mühlner Motorsport	(Germany) Rudi Adams (Belgium) Eric Nève (Germany) Manfred Theisen	Opel Astra	A3	10	DNF	DNF
2003	(Germany) Wiechers-Sport	(Germany) Ulrich Gallade (Germany) Thomas Mutsch (Germany) Hermann Tilke	V8Star Jaguar	E1	39	DNF	DNF
2004	(Germany) Recaro - Raeder Motorsport	(Germany) Ulrich Gallade (Germany) Hermann Tilke	V8Star Jaguar	E1	51	DNF	DNF
2005	(private entrant)	(Germany) Patrick Simon (Germany) Hermann Tilke	V8Star Jaguar	E1	7	DNF	DNF
2006	(Germany) Raeder Motorsport	(Germany) Peter Oberndorfer (Germany) Hermann Tilke	Lamborghini Gallardo	SP8	1	DNF	DNF
2007	(Germany) Land-Motorsport	(Germany) Marc Basseng (Germany) Marc Hennerici (Germany) Frank Stippler	Porsche 996 GT3-RSR	SP7	111	3rd	2nd
2007	(private entrant)	(Germany) Markus Grossmann (Germany) Peter Oberndorfer (Germany) Hermann Tilke	Lamborghini Gallardo	SP8	41	DNF	DNF
2008	(Germany) Raeder Motorsport	(Germany) Marc Hennerici (Germany) Ralf Schall (Germany) Hermann Tilke	Lamborghini Gallardo	SP8	111	106th	6th
2009	(Germany) Raeder Automotive	(Germany) Marc Hennerici (Germany) Thomas Mutsch (Germany) Hermann Tilke	Ford GT GT3	SP9; GT3	82	DNF	DNF
2010	(Germany) BMW Motorsport	(Germany) Dirk Müller (United Kingdom) Andy Priaulx (Germany) Dirk Werner	BMW M3 GT2	E1-XP2	150	7th	2nd
2011	(Germany) BMW Motorsport	(Portugal) Pedro Lamy (Germany) Dirk Müller (Germany) Dirk Werner	BMW M3 GT2	E1-XP2	139	DNF	DNF
2012	(Germany) BMW Team Schubert	(Germany) Uwe Alzen (Germany) Dirk Müller (Germany) Jörg Müller	BMW Z4 GT3	SP9; GT3	150	7th	7th
2012	(Germany) BMW Team Schubert	(Germany) Nico Bastian (Germany) Claudia Hürtgen (Germany) Dominik Schwager	BMW Z4 GT3	SP9; GT3	150	8th	8th
2013	(Germany) BMW Team Schubert	(Germany) Claudia Hürtgen (Germany) Jens Klingmann (Germany) Martin Tomczyk	BMW Z4 GT3	SP9; GT3	87	6th	6th
2014	(Germany) BMW Sports Trophy Team Marc VDS	(Netherlands) Nicky Catsburg (Belgium) Bas Leinders (Finland) Markus Palttala	BMW Z4 GT3	SP9; GT3	60	DNF	DNF
2015	(Germany) BMW Sports Trophy Team Marc VDS	(Netherlands) Nicky Catsburg (Brazil) Augusto Farfus (Germany) Jörg Müller	BMW Z4 GT3	SP9; GT3	155	4th	4th
2017	(Germany) Securtal Sorg Rennsport	(United Kingdom) Jethro Bovingdon (United Kingdom) Ricky Collard (Germany) Jörg Weidinger	BMW M4 GT4	SP8T	140	36th	1st
2018	(Germany) Securtal Sorg Rennsport	(Netherlands) Tom Coronel (Germany) Nico Menzel (Netherlands) Beitske Visser	BMW M4 GT4	SP8T	92	102nd	6th
2020	(Germany) Adrenalin Motorsport	(Netherlands) Tom Coronel (Germany) Christian Gebhardt (Germany) Niki Schelle	BMW M2 CS Racing	BMW M2	65	NC	NC
2021	(Germany) Teichmann Racing GT4	(Luxembourg) Daniel Bohr (Germany) Timo Mölig (Germany) Felix von der Laden	KTM X-Bow GT4	Cup-X	47	69th	5th
2022	(Germany) Teichmann Racing GTX	(Switzerland) Manuel Amweg (Germany) Tim Sandtler (Germany) Florian Wolf	KTM X-Bow GTX	Cup-X	91	DNF	DNF
2023	(Germany) Griesemann Gruppe by TR Team	(Germany) Björn Griesemann (Germany) Georg Griesemann (Germany) Felix von der Laden	Toyota GR Supra GT4 Evo	AT	138	46th	3rd
2024	(Germany) eFuel Team Griesemann	(Germany) Björn Griesemann (Germany) Georg Griesemann (Germany) Yves Volte	Toyota GR Supra GT4 Evo	AT3	44	48th	3rd
2025	(Germany) Manthey Team eFuel Griesemann	(Germany) Björn Griesemann (Germany) Georg Griesemann (Germany) Yves Volte	Porsche 718 Cayman GT4	AT2	130	20th	2nd

=== 24 Hours of Spa ===
Year	Team	Co-Drivers	Car	Class	Laps	Pos.	Class Pos.
2010	(Germany) BMW Motorsport	(Germany) Dirk Müller (Germany) Dirk Werner	BMW M3 GT2	GTN	540	3rd	1st

=== 24 Hours of Zolder ===
Year	Team	Co-Drivers	Car	Class	Laps	Pos.	Class Pos.
2015	(Germany) Walkenhorst Motorsport	(Sweden) Victor Bouveng (Switzerland) Louis Delétraz (United States) Trent Hindman	BMW M235i Racing Cup	T7	710	15th	9th
