= Marcel Tiemann =

German racing driver (born 1974)

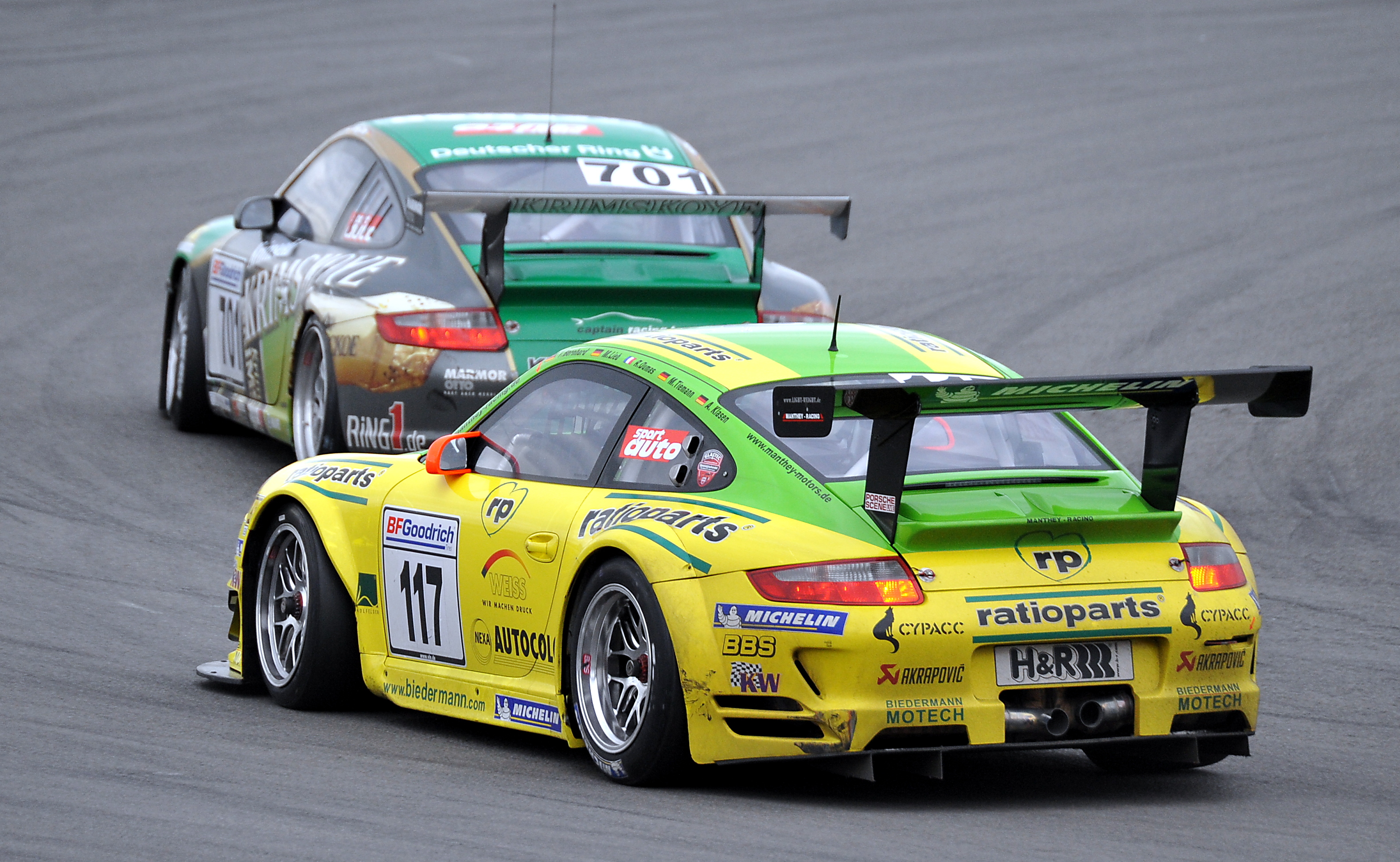
- Tiemann's Manthey Porsche at the 2009 VLN Series
- Nationality: Germany
- Born: Marcel Gerard Tiemann; March 19, 1974 (age 52) Hamburg, Germany
- Relatives: Hans-Jürgen Tiemann (father)
- Categorisation: FIA Platinum (until 2011); FIA Gold (2012–2014)

Previous series
- 2010 2003-2009 2009 2005-2008 2006 2005-2006 2005 2002 2000-2002 2001 1996-1997 1995-1996 1993-1994 1992: International GT Open; 24 Hours Nürburgring; Speedcar Series; Rolex Sports Car Series; FIA GT Championship; American Le Mans Series; Le Mans Series; Porsche Supercup; DTM; V8Star Germany; FIA GT1 World Championship; Formula 3 Germany; Formula Renault Germany; Formula König

Championship titles
- 2009 2008 2007 2006 2003 1994: 24 Hours Nürburgring; 24 Hours Nürburgring; 24 Hours Nürburgring; 24 Hours Nürburgring; 24 Hours Nürburgring; Formula Renault Germany

Marcel Gerard Tiemann (born 19 March 1974) is a German former racing driver. He is best known for being a five-time winner of the 24 Hours Nürburgring race with Opel and Porsche.

== Career ==
=== Early series ===
Tiemann started his career in Formula König before moving to Formula Renault Germany. In 1994, he won the championship, and graduated to Formula 3. In 1996, Tiemann won the Formula 3 Monaco Grand Prix driving for Opel.

=== Sportscars ===
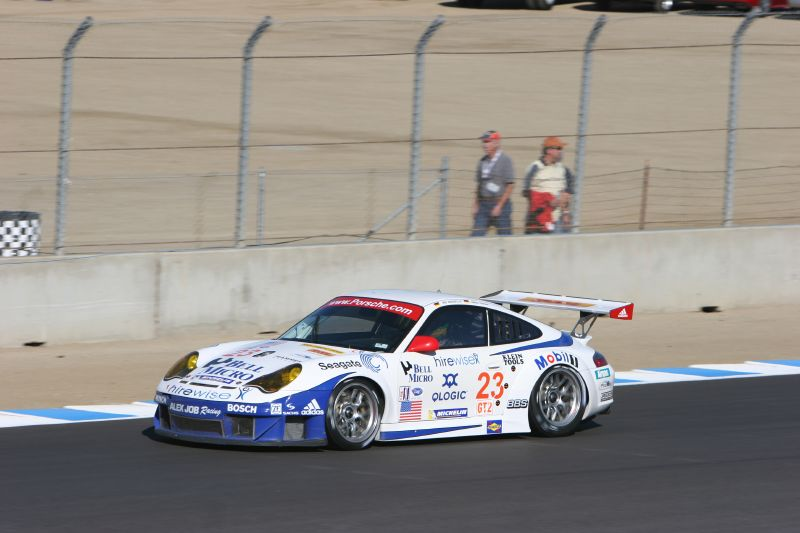
Marcel Tiemann driving in ALMS

In 1997, Tiemann switched from single seaters to sportscars, and competed in the FIA GT1 Championship season for AMG. He won the round in Suzuka, and secured podiums at four other races. Returning for 1998, his best result was second at Oschersleben.

In 1999, Tiemann was entered to race at the Le Mans 24h endurance race. However, the Mercedes-Benz CLR he was driving was involved in two high-profile accidents with Mark Webber driving, and the car was pulled out of the race.

In 2001, Tiemann drove for Zakspeed in V8Star Series finishing second in the championship with two wins.

Tiemann began racing in America in 2005, where he joined the American Le Mans Series and Grand American Rolex Series. In 2008, he scored his best finish in GrandAm at Watkins Glen driving for GM.

Tiemann made regular appearances in the Nürburgring Endurance Series during his career, taking 19 overall victories in total.

=== DTM ===
In 2000, Tiemann joined the Deutsche Tourenwagen Masters series with Team Persson driving a Mercedes CLK in Original-Teile livery. Over 16 races, Tiemann scored 53 points and finished tenth in the Championship. In 2001, he switched to Manthey Racing, still driving a Mercedes, and over three races, he scored his best finish in the series with third at the Norisring. In 2002, Tiemann returned for one race at Hockenheim, finishing 15th.

=== 24 Hours Nürburgring ===
Tiemann's greatest successes have come in the 24 Hours Nürburgring. He won his first in 2003 in the E1-XP class with OPC Team Phoenix's Opel Astra V8. He returned with the same team in 2004 and finished in tenth, before switching to the A7 class with Manthey Racing in their Porsche for 2005. He would pilot the car to victory in 2006, the first of four back to back victories at the race; driving exclusively Manthey Porsche's.

=== Accident at Imola ===
In 2010, Tiemann joined the International GT Open driving an Audi R8. However, during the race at Imola on May 23, Tiemann collided with another car at the rolling start and was forced into a retaining wall at high speed. He sustained brain trauma, a fractured vertebra and broken ribs in the impact, and was placed in a medically induced coma to assist his recovery. He was moved to Germany, and later regained consciousness and mostly recovered, but has been unable to race due to the resulting neurological damage and other problems from the accident.

== Personal life ==
Tiemann lives in Mallorca, Spain with his wife and two children. He previously lived in Monaco. Following retirement from racing, he became a brand ambassador for Mercedes-Benz and also runs a construction company building nursing homes in Germany. Tiemann's father is Hans-Jürgen Tiemann who won the 1997 and 1999 24 Hours of Nürburgring races, the latter with Sabine Schmitz.

== Racing record ==
=== Career Summary ===
Season	Series	Team	Races	Wins	Poles	F/Laps	Podiums	Points	Position
1992	Formula König		?	?	?	?	?	46	10th
1993	Formula Renault Germany	Elf Team Formel Renault	8	0	0	1	2	177	10th
1994	Formula Renault Germany	Elf Team Formel Renault	8	2	1	2	7	351	**1st**
1995	German Formula 3 Championship	Elf Zakspeed	16	0	0	0	0	24	13th
1996	German Formula 3 Championship	Opel Team BSR	15	1	0	1	6	115	4th
1996	Monaco Grand Prix Formula 3	Opel Team BSR	1	1	0	0	1	N/A	**1st**
1996	Masters of Formula 3	Opel Team BSR	1	0	0	0	0	N/A	DNF
1997	FIA GT Championship - GT1	AMG-Mercedes	9	1	0	0	5	34	5th
1998	FIA GT Championship - GT1	Team Persson Motorsport	9	0	0	0	1	19	9th
1999	24 Hours of Le Mans - LMGTP	AMG-Mercedes	1	0	0	0	0	N/A	DNF
2000	Deutsche Tourenwagen Masters	Persson Motorsport	16	0	0	0	0	53	10th
2001	Deutsche Tourenwagen Masters	Manthey Racing	3	0	0	0	1	26	12th
2001	V8Star Series	Zakspeed Motorsport	9	2	2	2	5	203	**2nd**
2002	Deutsche Tourenwagen Masters	Manthey Racing	1	0	0	0	0	0	25th
2002	Porsche Supercup	Software AG-Manthey Racing	12	0	0	0	0	100	9th
2003	24 Hours of Nürburgring - E1-XP	OPC Team Phoenix	1	1	?	?	1	N/A	**1st**
2004	24 Hours of Nürburgring	Team Phoenix	1	0	0	?	0	N/A	10th
2005	24 Hours of Nürburgring - A7	Manthey Racing	1	0	?	?	0	N/A	6th
2005	Rolex Sports Car Series - DP	Orbit Racing	1	0	0	0	0	23	70th
2005	Le Mans Endurance Series - GT1	A-Level Engineering	3	0	0	0	1	9	11th
2005	American Le Mans Series - GT2	Alex Job Racing	1	0	0	0	1	22	17th
2006	Rolex Sports Car Series - DP	Alex Job Racing	1	0	0	0	0	12	102nd
2006	American Le Mans Series - GT2	Alex Job Racing	4	0	0	0	2	41	16th
2006	FIA GT Championship - GT2	Manthey Racing	1	0	0	0	0	0	NC
2006	24 Hours Nürburgring - SP7	Manthey Racing	1	1	?	?	1	N/A	**1st**
2007	24 Hours of Nürburgring - SP7	Manthey Racing	1	1	0	?	1	N/A	**1st**
2008	Rolex Sports Car Series - DP	Bob Stallings/Riley-Matthews	1	0	0	0	0	18	55th
2008	24 Hours of Nürburgring - SP7	Manthey Racing	1	1	0	0	1	N/A	**1st**
2008-09	Speedcar Series	Continental Circus	1	0	0	0	0	0	NC
2009	24 Hours of Nürburgring - SP7	Manthey Racing	1	1	?	?	1	N/A	**1st**
2010	International GT Open	Phoenix Racing	6	0	0	0	0	22	27th

=== Complete Deutsche Tourenwagen Masters results ===
(key) (Races in bold indicate pole position) (Races in italics indicate fastest lap)

Year	Team	Car	1	2	3	4	5	6	7	8	9	10	11	12	13	14	15	16	17	18	19	20	Pos.	Pts
2000	Persson Motorsport	AMG Mercedes CLK-DTM	HOC; 1; 6	HOC; 2; 12	OSC; 1; 10	OSC; 2; 6	NOR; 1; 6	NOR; 2 Ret	SAC; 1; 5	SAC; 2; 5	NÜR; 1; 13	NÜR; 2; 6	LAU; 1 C	LAU; 2 C	OSC; 1 NC	OSC; 2; 7	NÜR; 1; 8	NÜR; 2; 12	HOC; 1; 15	HOC; 2; 5			10th	53
2001	Manthey-Eschmann Racing	AMG Mercedes CLK-DTM	HOC; QR	HOC; CR	NÜR; QR	NÜR; CR	OSC; QR; 12	OSC; CR; 8	SAC; QR; 7	SAC; CR; 4	NOR; QR; 3	NOR; CR; 3	LAU; QR	LAU; CR	NÜR; QR	NÜR; CR	A1R; QR	A1R; CR	ZAN; QR	ZAN; CR	HOC; QR	HOC; CR	12th	26
2002	Manthey Racing	AMG Mercedes CLK-DTM 2001	HOC; QR; 15	HOC; CR; 15	ZOL; QR	ZOL; CR	DON; QR	DON; CR	SAC; QR	SAC; CR	NOR; QR	NOR; CR	LAU; QR	LAU; CR	NÜR; QR	NÜR; CR	A1R; QR	A1R; CR	ZAN; QR	ZAN; CR	HOC; QR	HOC; CR	25th	0

- † — Retired, but was classified as he completed 90% of the winner's race distance.

=== Complete 24 Hours of Nürburgring results ===
Year	Team	Co-Drivers	Car	Class	Laps	Pos.	Class Pos.
1994	(Germany) Dürener Motorsportclub	(Austria) Philipp Peter (Switzerland) Peter Wyss	Rover 220 GSi	4	81	93rd	20th
2003	(Germany) OPC Team Phoenix	(Germany) Manuel Reuter (Germany) Timo Scheider (Germany) Volker Strycek	Opel Astra V8 Coupé	E1	143	1st	1st
2004	(Germany) OPC Team Phoenix	(Germany) Manuel Reuter (Germany) Timo Scheider (Germany) Volker Strycek	Opel Astra V8 Coupé	E1	129	10th	5th
2005	(Germany) Manthey Racing	(Germany) Timo Bernhard (France) Emmanuel Collard (Germany) Lucas Luhr	Porsche 996 GT3-MR	A7	127	9th	6th
2006	(Germany) Manthey Racing	(Germany) Timo Bernhard (Germany) Lucas Luhr (Germany) Mike Rockenfeller	Porsche 996 GT3-MR	SP7	151	1st	1st
2007	(Germany) Manthey Racing	(Germany) Timo Bernhard (France) Romain Dumas (Germany) Marc Lieb	Porsche 997 GT3-RSR	SP7	112	1st	1st
2008	(Germany) Manthey Racing	(Germany) Timo Bernhard (France) Romain Dumas (Germany) Marc Lieb	Porsche 997 GT3-RSR	SP7	148	1st	1st
2009	(Germany) Manthey Racing	(Germany) Timo Bernhard (France) Romain Dumas (Germany) Marc Lieb	Porsche 997 GT3-RSR	SP7	155	1st	1st
2010	(Germany) Manthey Racing	(Germany) Timo Bernhard (France) Romain Dumas (Germany) Marc Lieb	Porsche 997 GT3-R	SP9 GT3	47	DNF	DNF

=== 24 Hours of Le Mans results ===
Year	Team	Co-Drivers	Car	Class	Laps	Pos.	Class Pos.
1999	(Germany) AMG-Mercedes	(Australia) Mark Webber (France) Jean-Marc Gounon	Mercedes-Benz CLR	LMGTP	0	DNS	DNS

=== 24 Hours of Spa results ===
Year	Team	Co-Drivers	Car	Class	Laps	Pos.	Class Pos.
2006	(Germany) Manthey Racing	(Germany) Lucas Luhr (Germany) Sascha Maassen	Porsche 997 GT3-RSR	G2	518	14th	1st

Sporting positions
Preceded by Arnd Meier	German Formula Renault champion 1994	Succeeded by Ralf Druckenmüller
Preceded by Gianantonio Pacchioni	Monaco Formula Three Support; Race Winner; 1996	Succeeded by Nick Heidfeld
