= Arno Klasen =

German racecar driver (born 1967)

Arno Klasen (born 1967 in Karlshausen, Germany) is a German racecar driver best known for his long career in VLN endurance racing series on the Nürburgring. He has collected 26 overall wins in the category, ranking fourth after Jürgen Alzen, Olaf Manthey and Ullrich Richter.

Klasen started his career in karting. He entered VLN in 1994, scoring 26 overall wins, mainly on Jürgen Alzen Porsche.

Klasen was also on the Seikel Motorsport roster for the 2004 Le Mans Series season, but he never raced.

He entered for the 2006 24 Hours of Le Mans.
