= Uwe Alzen =

German racing driver (born 1967)

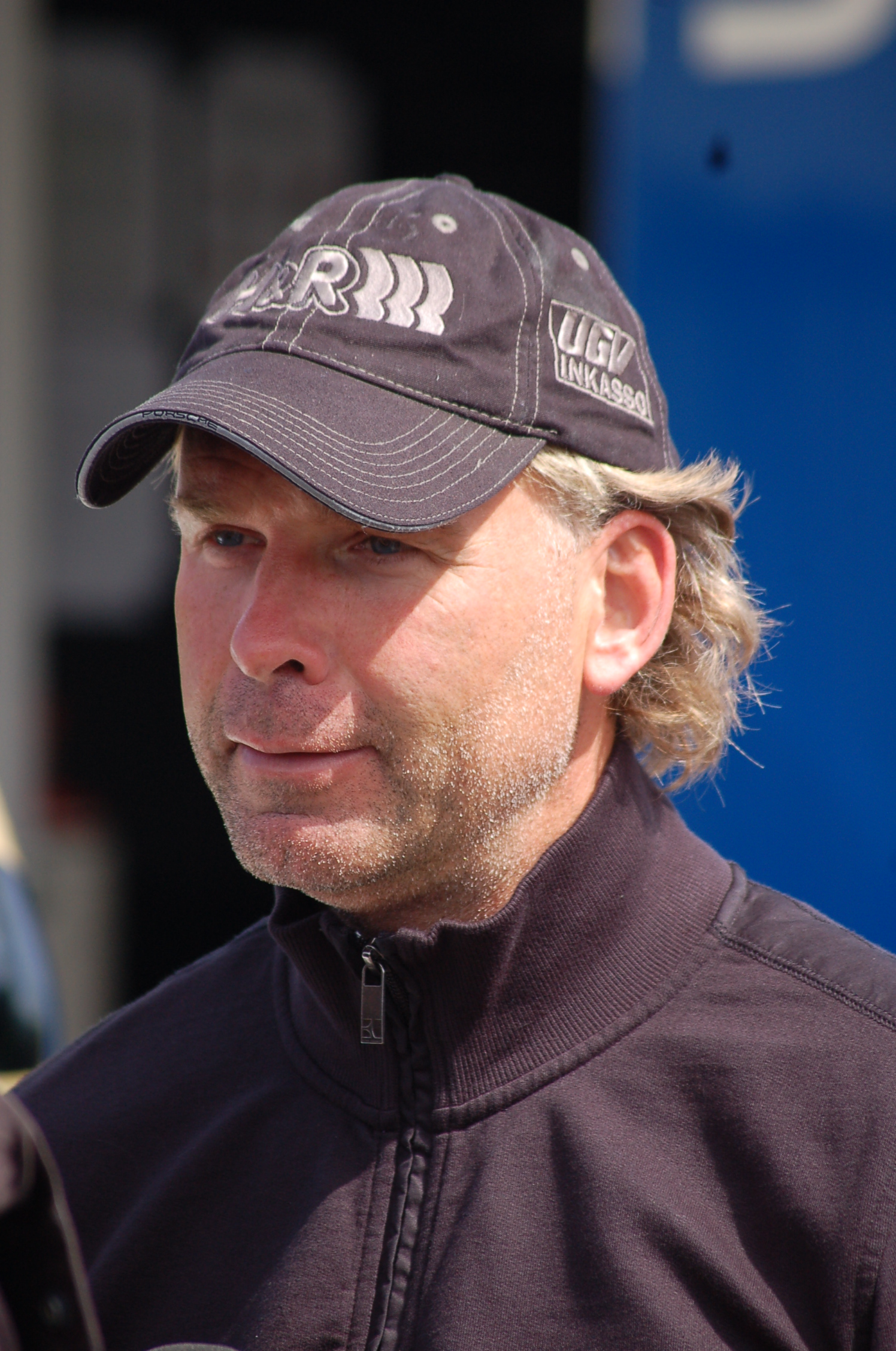
- Alzen in 2011
- Nationality: German
- Born: 18 August 1967 (age 59) Kirchen, West Germany
- Relatives: Jürgen Alzen (brother)
- Categorisation: FIA Gold (until 2022); FIA Silver (2023–)

24 Hours of Le Mans career
- Years: 1998–1999, 2010
- Teams: Porsche AG; Manthey Racing; BMW Motorsport
- Best finish: 2nd (1998)
- Class wins: 1 (1999)

Uwe Alzen (born 18 August 1967) is a German racing driver specialised in touring car racing and sports car racing. He is a two-time Nürburgring 24 Hours winner, for Porsche in 2000 and for BMW in 2010.

== Biography ==
Alzen won the 1992 Porsche Carrera Cup Deutschland, the 1993 24 Hours of Spa, the 1994 Porsche Supercup and the 1995 Deutsche Tourenwagen Meisterschaft privateer B-Class championship.

In 1996, Alzen raced in the full Deutsche Tourenwagen Meisterschaft International Touring Car Championship, driving an Opel Calibra V6. When this series was discontinued, he raced for Opel in the German Super Tourenwagen Cup. Alzen celebrated an apparent championship win in 1999 for Opel under controversial circumstances after a last corner incident involving his teammate Roland Asch and his main rival for the championship Christian Abt. Alzen, who was leading the race at the time, barely limped to second place after crashing with Abt's teammate Kris Nissen, whom he was trying to lap seconds earlier at the chicane. Weeks later though, his Championship win was stripped and was given to his rival, Christian Abt, after an amateur video proved that Asch had deliberately crashed into Abt.

Alzen continued with Opel in 2000 in the new Deutsche Tourenwagen Masters, but was released after colliding with his teammate Manuel Reuter. He left the AMG-Mercedes team in 2003 under similar circumstances.

Alzen won the GT1 category of the 1998 24 Hours of Daytona in a Rohr Motorsport Porsche 911 GT1 Evo. Alzen was also a competitor in the 1998 FIA GT Championship season and 1998 24 Hours of Le Mans race in a Porsche 911 GT1, finishing second overall. In 2004, he also competed in FIA GT, with Michael Bartels on a Vitaphone-sponsored Saleen S7.

In 2000, Alzen won the Nürburgring 24 Hours overall for Porsche Zentrum Koblenz (Phoenix Racing), with Michael Bartels, Altfrid Heger and Bernd Mayländer.

Alzen and his elder brother Jürgen were also driving at the Nürburgring Nordschleife VLN Endurance racing series and 24 Hours Nürburgring in their privately built Porsche 996 GT2 Turbo 4WD from 2003 to 2005. Uwe Alzen set the lap record there with this Turbo at 8:09, about ten seconds faster than the factory cars of Opel and Audi from the DTM, as well as the BMW M3 V8 GTR of Schnitzer Motorsport. He also beat them to Nürburgring 24 Hours pole positions, yet his car failed at the start of the 2005 wet race due to electronic problems, prompting another very emotional interview.

In 2003, Alzen finished 4th in the 24 Hours of Bathurst, 1st in class, and in 2004 Nürburgring Fans voted Alzen Driver of the Year 2004.

Due to rule changes for 2006, the Alzen brothers discontinued their use of a turbo engine in favor of a normally aspirated Porsche 997 GT3. But they chose to run a standard H pattern manual gearbox in the 2006 24 Hours of Nürburgring race, convinced that the Porsche sequential gearbox would not last. They finished in second place, after the Manthey Porsche which has a sequential gearbox that saves several seconds per lap. Uwe was quite upset with the disadvantages of having a manual gearbox during the post race press conference.

In 2008, Alzen entered the Speedcar International Series, racing for Phoenix Racing, winning two races and finishing third overall.

In 2010, Alzen became a BMW Motorsport factory driver. He won the 24 Hours of Nürburgring overall, sharing an experimental BMW M3 GT2 with Augusto Farfus, Pedro Lamy and Jörg Müller, and also returned to the 24 Hours of Le Mans. In 2012, Alzen entered the first and last race of the American Le Mans Series for BMW Team RLL. He also drove a BMW Z4 GT3 in the 24 Hours of Nürburgring (pole-sitter in 2012), VLN Series and ADAC GT Masters until 2015. In 2016, Alzen came third at the 24 Hours of Nürburgring in a Haribo Racing Team Mercedes-AMG GT3.

== Racing record ==
=== Complete 24 Hours of Le Mans results ===
Year	Team	Co-Drivers	Car	Class	Laps	Pos.	Class Pos.
1998	(Germany) Porsche AG	(Germany) Jörg Müller (France) Bob Wollek	Porsche 911 GT1-98	GT1	350	**2nd**	**2nd**
1999	(Germany) Manthey Racing	(Netherlands) Patrick Huisman (Italy) Luca Riccitelli	Porsche 911 GT3-R	GT	317	13th	**1st**
2010	(Germany) BMW Motorsport	(Germany) Jörg Müller (Brazil) Augusto Farfus	BMW M3 GT2	GT2	320	19th	6th

=== Complete Deutsche Tourenwagen Meisterschaft/Masters results ===
(key) (Races in bold indicate pole position) (Races in italics indicate fastest lap)

Year	Team	Car	1	2	3	4	5	6	7	8	9	10	11	12	13	14	15	16	17	18	19	20	21	22	23	24	Pos.	Pts
1993	Persson Motorsport	Mercedes 190E 2.5-16 Evo2	ZOL; 1 Ret	ZOL; 2; 11	HOC; 1; 5	HOC; 2; 9	NÜR; 1 Ret	NÜR; 2 DNS	WUN; 1; 9	WUN; 2; 9	NÜR; 1; 23	NÜR; 2; 12	NOR; 1; 7	NOR; 2; 7	DON; 1; 9	DON; 2; 7	DIE; 1; 8	DIE; 2; 7	ALE; 1	ALE; 2	AVU; 1; 7	AVU; 2; 7	HOC; 1; 8	HOC; 2 Ret			11th	40
1994	Persson Motorsport	Mercedes 190E Class 1	ZOL; 1; 11	ZOL; 2; 11	HOC; 1; 13	HOC; 2; 13	NÜR; 1; 11	NÜR; 2; 13	MUG; 1; 15	MUG; 2; 11	NÜR; 1; 13	NÜR; 2; 11	NOR; 1 Ret	NOR; 2 Ret	DON; 1; 12	DON; 2; 6	DIE; 1; 13	DIE; 2; 12	NÜR; 1; 14	NÜR; 2; 11	AVU; 1; 12	AVU; 2; 10	ALE; 1; 12	ALE; 2; 8	HOC; 1; 14	HOC; 2; 11	18th	4
1995	Persson Motorsport	Mercedes C-Class V6	HOC; 1; 11	HOC; 2 Ret	AVU; 1 Ret	AVU; 2; 12	NOR; 1; 15	NOR; 2 Ret	DIE; 1 Ret	DIE; 2 Ret	NÜR; 1; 9	NÜR; 2; 8	ALE; 1; 12	ALE; 2; 9	HOC; 1; 3	HOC; 2; 2											14th	34
2000	OPC Team Holzer	Opel Astra V8 Coupé	HOC; 1 Ret	HOC; 2 DNS	OSC; 1 Ret	OSC; 2; 9	NOR; 1; 8	NOR; 2; 6	SAC; 1 Ret	SAC; 2 Ret	NÜR; 1; 10	NÜR; 2; 13	OSC; 1; 1	**OSC**; **2**; 4	NÜR; 1; 3	NÜR; 2; 6	HOC; 1; 1	**HOC**; **2**; 1									6th	100
2001	Team Warsteiner AMG	AMG-Mercedes CLK-DTM	HOC; QR; 5	HOC; CR; 4	NÜR; QR; 7	NÜR; CR; 19	OSC; QR; 4	OSC; CR; 3	SAC; QR; 11	SAC; CR; Ret	NOR; QR; 2	NOR; CR; 1	**LAU**; **QR**; 1	**LAU**; **CR**; Ret	NÜR; QR; 2	NÜR; CR; 2	A1R; QR; 3	A1R; CR; 3	ZAN; QR; 7	ZAN; CR; 1	HOC; QR; 7	HOC; CR; 7					**2nd**	**101**
2002	HWA Team	AMG-Mercedes CLK-DTM	HOC; QR; 9	HOC; CR; 11	ZOL; QR; 8	ZOL; CR; 7	DON; QR; Ret	DON; CR; DNS	SAC; QR; 11	SAC; CR; 9	NOR; QR; 2	NOR; CR; 5	LAU; QR; 9	LAU; CR; Ret	**NÜR**; **QR**; 1	**NÜR**; **CR**; 1	A1R; QR; 5	A1R; CR; 4	ZAN; QR; 7	ZAN; CR; 17	HOC; QR; 8	HOC; CR; 3					6th	24

=== Complete International Touring Car Championship results ===
(key) (Races in bold indicate pole position) (Races in italics indicate fastest lap)

Year	Team	Car	1	2	3	4	5	6	7	8	9	10	11	12	13	14	15	16	17	18	19	20	21	22	23	24	25	26	Pos.	Pts
1995	Persson Motorsport	Mercedes C-Class V6	MUG; 1; 14	MUG; 2; 9	HEL; 1 NC	HEL; 2; 4	DON; 1; 7	DON; 2; 7	EST; 1; 13	EST; 2; 12	MAG; 1; 9	MAG; 2; 7																	12th	26
1996	Opel Team Zakspeed	Opel Calibra V6 4x4	HOC; 1; 8	HOC; 2; 6	NÜR; 1; 18	NÜR; 2; 4	EST; 1; 5	EST; 2; 2	HEL; 1; 13	HEL; 2 Ret	**NOR**; **1**; 2	NOR; 2; 2	DIE; 1; 11	DIE; 2; 10	SIL; 1; 13	SIL; 2 Ret	NÜR; 1; 12	NÜR; 2; 6	MAG; 1; 4	MAG; 2; 13	MUG; 1; 7	MUG; 2; 3	HOC; 1; 3	HOC; 2 Ret	INT; 1 Ret	INT; 2 DNS	SUZ; 1; 9	SUZ; 2; 12	8th	119

=== Partial Porsche Supercup results ===
(key) (Races in bold indicate pole position) (Races in italics indicate fastest lap)

Year	Team	Car	1	2	3	4	5	6	7	8	9	10	11	12	Pos.	Pts
2003	Porsche AG	Porsche 996 GT3	ITA	ESP	AUT	MON	GER; 12	FRA	GBR	GER	HUN	ITA	USA	USA	NC‡	0‡
2005	Konrad Motorsport	Porsche 997 GT3	ITA	ESP	MON	GER	USA; 14	USA; 4	FRA; 2	GBR; 4	GER; 6	HUN; Ret	ITA; 20†	BEL; 3	10th	87
2006	PZ Koblenz	Porsche 997 GT3	BHR; 1	ITA; Ret	GER; 7	ESP; 4	MON; 4	**GBR**; 1	USA; 9	USA; 9	**FRA**; 1	GER; 2	HUN; 5	ITA; 1	**2nd**	**166**
2007	SPS Automotive	Porsche 997 GT3	**BHR**; 2	BHR; 1	ESP; Ret	MON; 4	**FRA**; 1	GBR; 6	GER; 10	HUN; 18	TUR; 3	ITA; 3	BEL; 13		**3rd**	**128**
2008	SPS Automotive	Porsche 997 GT3	BHR; 8	BHR; 4	ESP; 10	TUR; 4	MON; 4	FRA; 6	GBR	GER	HUN	ESP	BEL	ITA	13th	67

† — Did not finish the race, but was classified as he completed over 90% of the race distance.

‡ — Not eligible for points.

Sporting positions
Preceded by Roland Asch	Porsche Carrera Cup Germany champion 1992	Succeeded by Wolfgang Land
Preceded by Altfrid Heger	Porsche Supercup champion 1994	Succeeded by Jean-Pierre Malcher
Preceded by Dirk Werner	Porsche Carrera Cup Germany champion 2007	Succeeded by René Rast
