= Jürgen Alzen =

German car racer

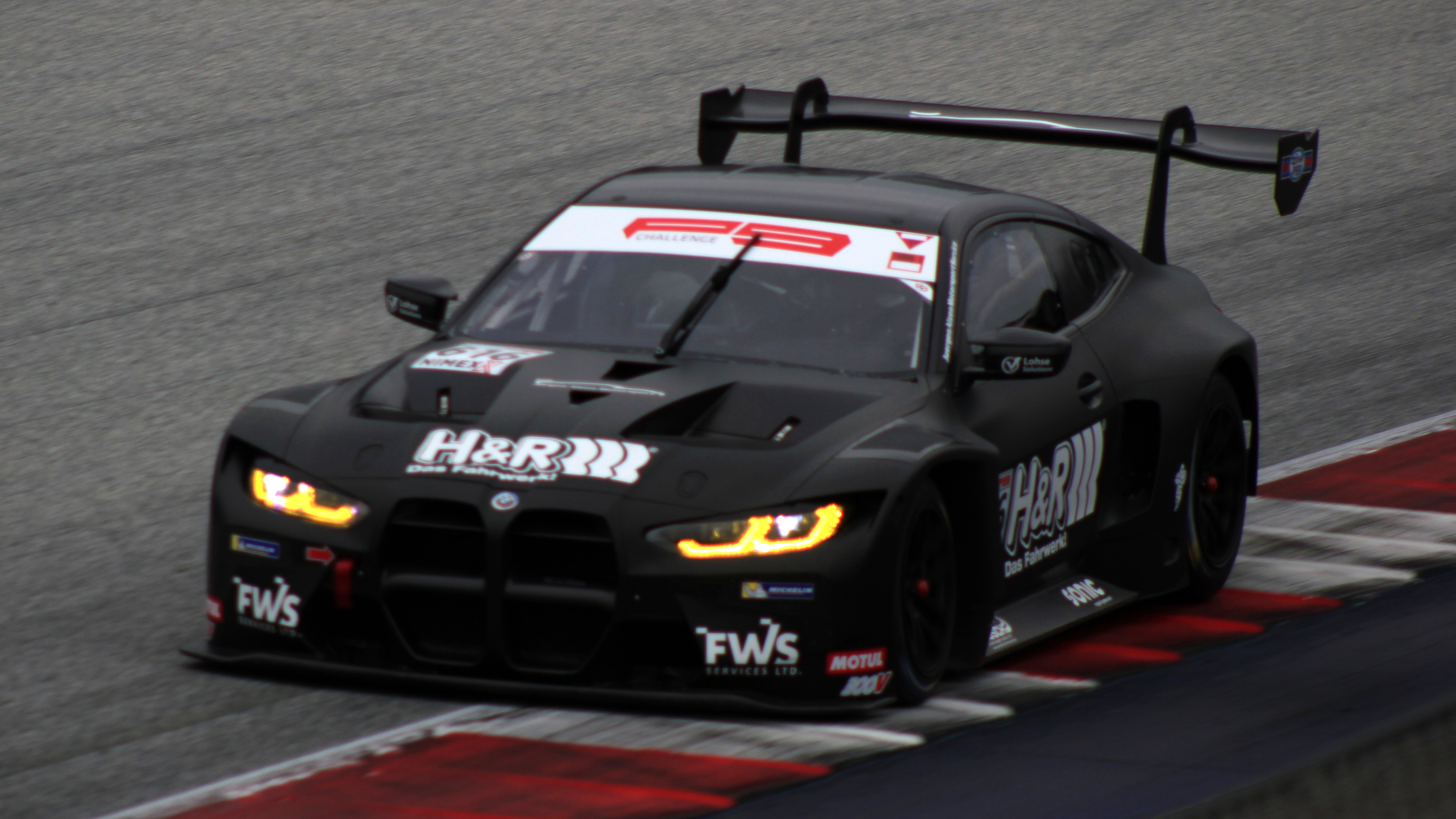
- Nationality: (Germany) German
- Born: 26 November 1962 (age 63) Kirchen, West Germany
- Relatives: Uwe Alzen (brother)

Championship titles
- 2010: Rundstrecken-Challenge Nürburgring (RCN)

Jürgen Alzen (born 26 November 1962 in Kirchen, Rhineland-Palatinate) is a race car driver from Germany.

He drove one race in both the FIA GT Championship and the American Le Mans Series of 2001 for his own Alzen Porsche team. He has also raced in Australia appearing in both the 2002 and 2003 Bathurst 24 Hour races held at the Mount Panorama Circuit. Alzen finished the 2003 race in 4th outright and 1st in Class B driving a Porsche 996 GT3 S Cup.

Jürgen Alzen and his younger brother Uwe Alzen were driving also at the Nürburgring Nordschleife VLN Endurance racing series and 24 Hours Nürburgring, in 2003 to 2005 in their privately built Porsche 996. Per regulations the car was entered as "911 Turbo", which permitted all wheel drive and turbocharging, but little was left of the road car. The engine had more in common with the mid engine 911 GT1 variants. In the following years this topic off highly modified Porsches 'harassing the works effort' was kept up with a turbo variant of the 911 997 and later a privately build race version of the then new Cayman, equipped with the 997 GT3 race engine. The success of that car in particular resulted in dispute between Porsche and Alzen Motorsport (Porsche saw its new 997 GT3 works effort put into bad light), and lastly caused team Alzen to abandon the Porsche brand in favour of running a GT3 variant of the Ford GT.

Jürgen has won 29 Nürburgring Endurance Series (formerly VLN) races in his career, just one fewer than current record holder Olaf Manthey.
