= H&R (company) =

German automobile suspension manufacturing company

H&R Special Springs, LP
- Native name: H&R Spezialfedern GmbH & Co KG
- Company type: Private
- Industry: Automotive
- Founded: 1980; 46 years ago
- Founder: Werner Heine; Heinz Remmen
- Headquarters: Lennestadt, North Rhine-Westphalia, Germany
- Products: Automotive parts
- Website: https://h-r.com

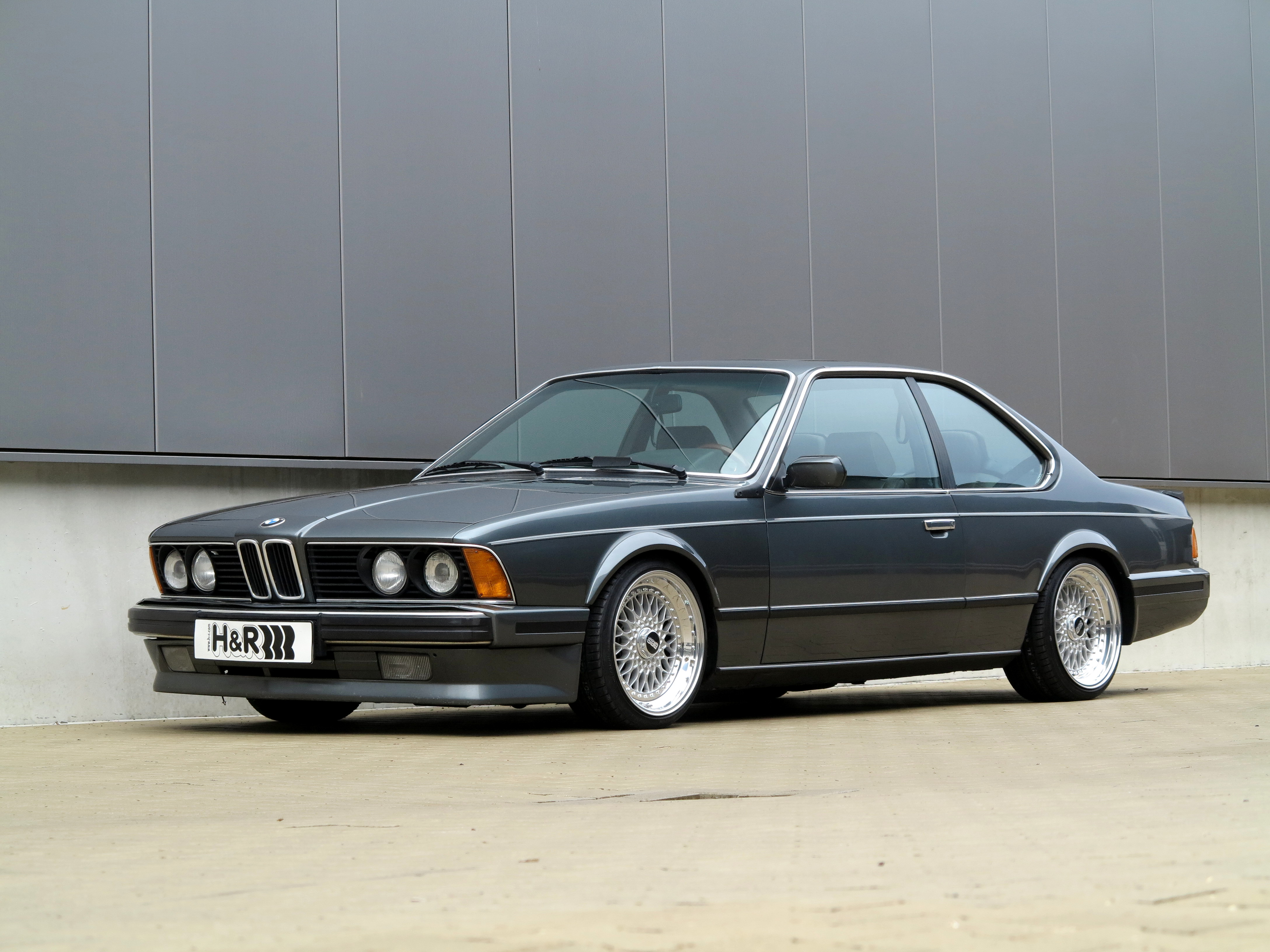
BMW E24 635CSi with H&R suspension

H&R Spezialfedern GmbH & Co KG (English: H&R Special Springs, LP) is a German company that specializes in the development and production of suspension and chassis systems for the automotive industry and for motorsport applications.

== History ==
The company was founded in 1980 by Werner Heine and Heinrich Remmen with the purpose of making aftermarket suspension for lowering road cars. The family-owned business began designing, manufacturing, and producing springs that would effectively lower a car and give it enhanced performance, handling, and aesthetics.

H&R was the first manufacturer to submit a lowering spring to the Technischer Überwachungsverein certification body, and helped pioneer the aftermarket spring industry in Europe. The early effort by the company led to gaining a TÜV certification for its products, which it continues to meet. With this spearheading approach of H&R springs, the viability of aftermarket lowering springs in Germany was proven, thus launching a new market for Germany and Europe. H&R later also achieved the Allgemeine Betriebs Erlaubnis (ABE) certification in 1993.

Since the beginning, H&R products are wholly designed and manufactured in Germany. The company focuses on exceeding ISO quality assurance standards in production.

== Company ==
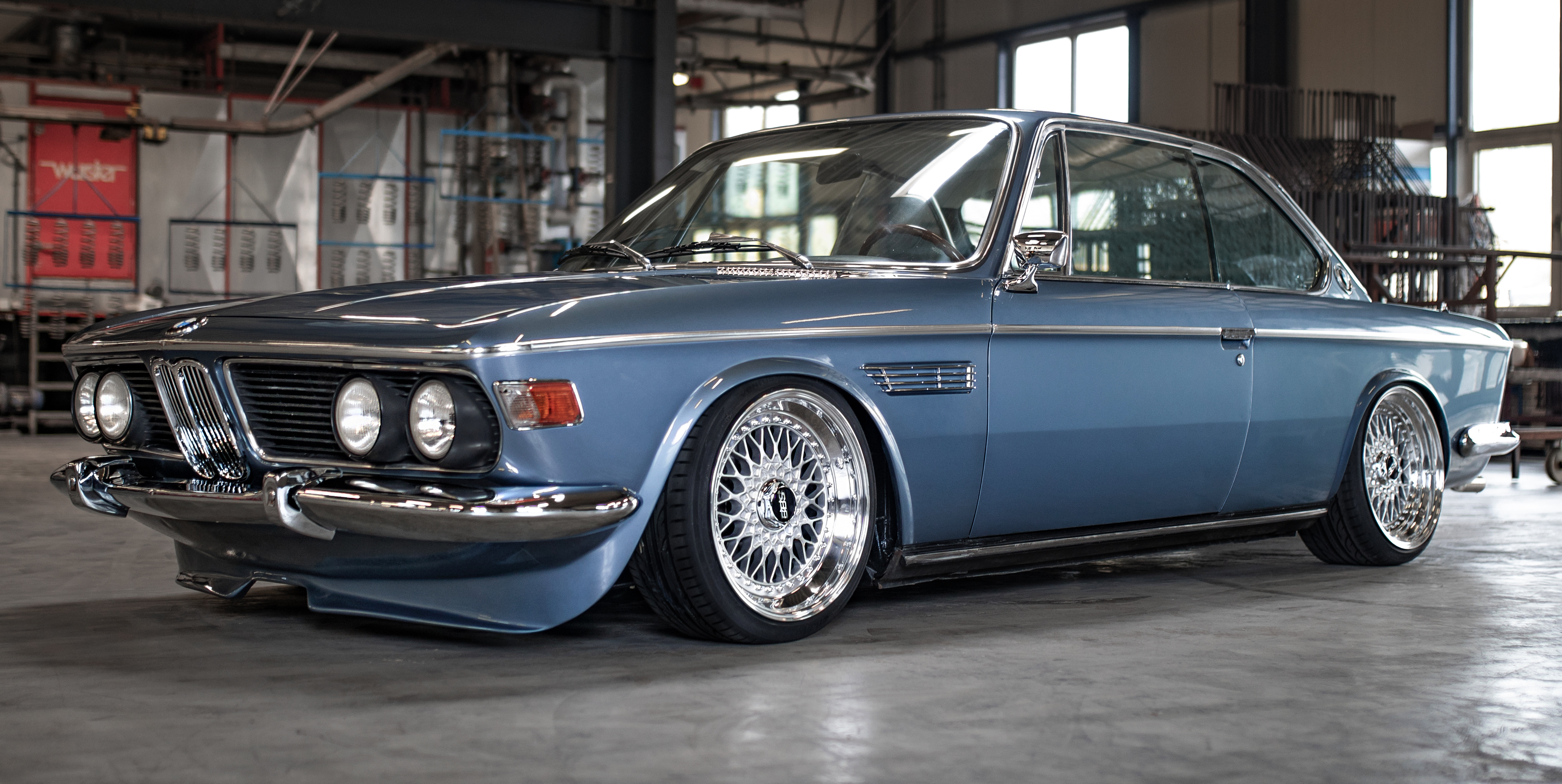
BMW E9 3.0 CSi with H&R coilover suspension

In the present day, H&R produces multiple spring lines, cup kits, coilovers, ETS electronic lowering modules, VTF adjustable lowering springs, race springs, sport sway bars, and various accessories. H&R also has the largest wheel spacer and adapter program in the industry. The company currently produces over 48,500 products for over 4,000 vehicles from over 60 brands.

The company has officially partnered with car manufacturers such as Volkswagen and Ford to produce specially modified demo vehicles for motor shows such as the Essen Motor Show and SEMA Show.

H&R has also partnered in original equipment applications, such as by partnering with Volkswagen to produce the springs for all Golf R32 models.

== Motorsport ==
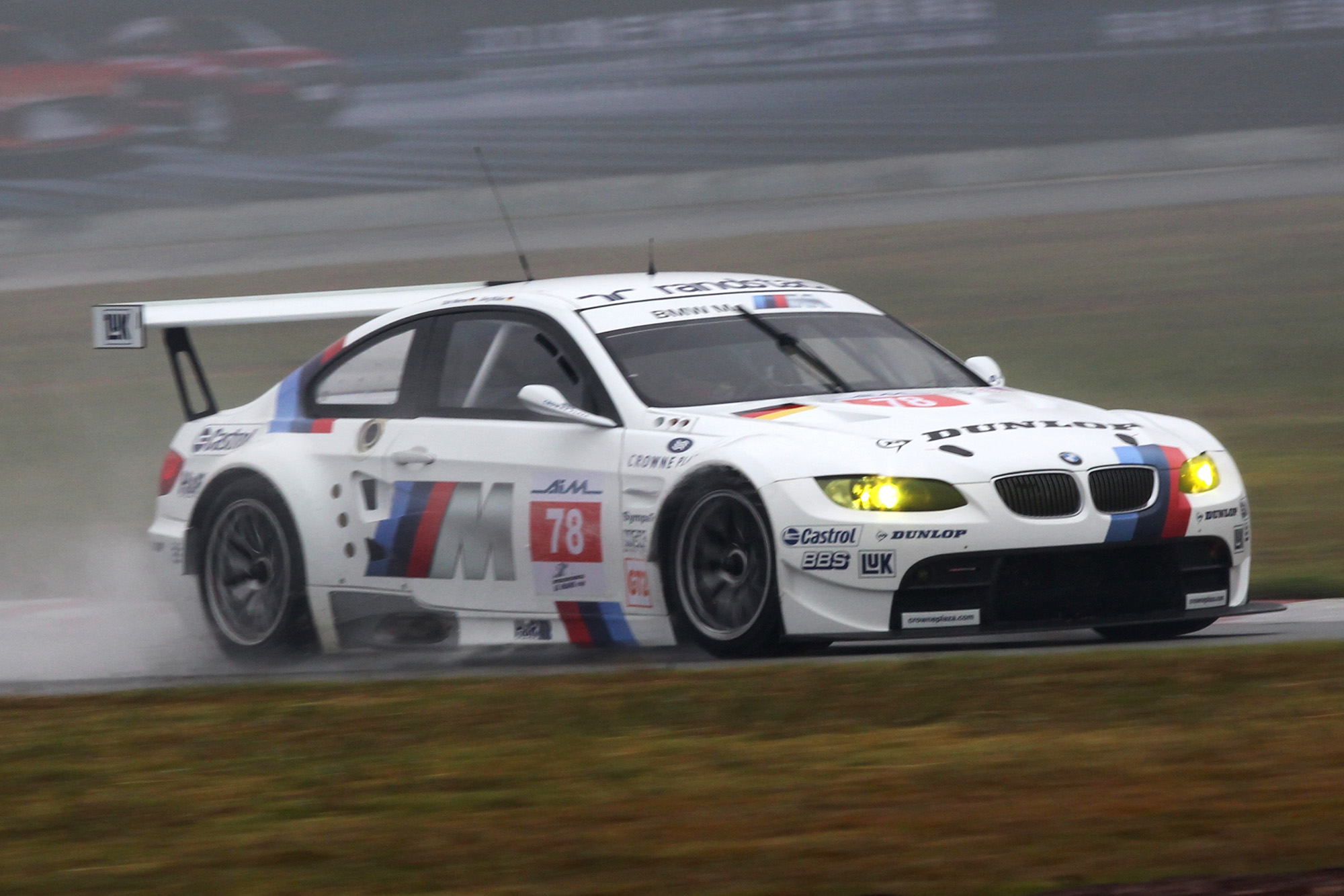
BMW M3 GT2 racecar with H&R suspension at the 2010 1000 km of Zhuhai

H&R also has extensive research and development through motorsport usage, with its products being used in various forms of sports car racing and touring car racing. The company has produced suspension and chassis components for race applications on manufacturers such as Porsche, BMW, and Duqueine. H&R has both sponsored teams and entered their own works teams in the IMSA SportsCar Championship, IMSA Prototype Challenge, Nürburgring Endurance Series, and 24 Hours of Daytona.
