= 2002 Porsche Supercup =

10th Porsche Supercup season

Seasons
- ← 2001 2003 →

The 2002 Porsche Michelin Supercup season was the 10th Porsche Supercup season. The races were all supporting races in the 2002 Formula One season. It travelled to 10 circuits across Europe and a double-header at Indianapolis, USA. The 2002 season was the first season that cars did not run on Pirelli tyres, instead running on Michelin tyres in the first year of an eternal control-tyre deal.

== Teams and drivers ==
Team	No.	Drivers	Rounds
(Germany) Porsche AG	1	(Italy) Luigi Moccia	1
(Germany) Porsche AG	1	(Spain) Emilio de Villota	2
(Germany) Porsche AG	1	(Austria) Heinz Kinigadner	3
(Germany) Porsche AG	1	(France) Luc Alphand	4
(Germany) Porsche AG	1	(Germany) Katja Poensgen	5
(Germany) Porsche AG	1	(Republic of Ireland) Damien Faulkner	6
(Germany) Porsche AG	1	(Germany) Christoph Langen	7
(Germany) Porsche AG	1	(France) Michel Neugarten	8
(Germany) Porsche AG	1	(Netherlands) Patrick Huisman	9
(Germany) Porsche AG	1	(United States) Bill Adam	11
(Germany) Porsche AG	2	(Italy) Luca Riccitelli	1
(Germany) Porsche AG	2	(Spain) Jesus Diez de Villarroel	2
(Germany) Porsche AG	2	(Austria) Gustl Auinger	3
(Germany) Porsche AG	2	(Japan) Ryo Fukuda	4
(Germany) Porsche AG	2	(Germany) Mark Warnecke	5
(Germany) Porsche AG	2	(United Kingdom) Darren Manning	6
(Germany) Porsche AG	2	(Switzerland) Peter Wyss	7
(Germany) Porsche AG	2	(Hungary) Attila Barta	8
(Germany) Porsche AG	2	(Belgium) Marc Duez	9
(Germany) Porsche AG	2	(Italy) Daniele Massaro	10
(Germany) Porsche AG	2	(United States) Antonio Sabato Jr.	11
(Germany) UPS Porsche-Junior Team	28	(Germany) Marc Lieb	1, 5, 7–8
(Germany) UPS Porsche-Junior Team	29	(Germany) Mike Rockenfeller	1, 5, 7–8
(Germany) Software AG-Manthey Racing	3/58	(Australia) Alex Davison	All
(Germany) Software AG-Manthey Racing	3	(Germany) Sascha Maassen	9
(Germany) Software AG-Manthey Racing	4	(Germany) Marcel Tiemann	All
(Germany) Infineon-Team Farnbacher PZN	5	(Germany) Marco Werner	All
(Germany) Infineon-Team Farnbacher PZN	6	(Austria) Philipp Peter	All
(Germany) Infineon-Team Farnbacher PZN	25	(Austria) Toto Wolff	3
(Germany) Infineon-Team Farnbacher PZN	26	(Netherlands) Roeland Voermann	4
(France) Larbre Compétition Chéreau	7	(France) Christophe Bouchut	All
(France) Larbre Compétition Chéreau	8	(France) Jean-Luc Chéreau	1, 4, 7, 9
(France) Larbre Compétition Chéreau	8	(France) Jack Leconte	2–3, 5–6, 8, 10–11
(France) Larbre Compétition Chéreau	9	(France) Roger Berville	All
(France) Larbre Compétition Chéreau	10	(France) Michel Mora	1–4, 6–7, 9–11
(France) Larbre Compétition Chéreau	10	(France) Alain Muraour	5, 8
(Germany) Kadach Tuning + Service	11	(Austria) Hubert Neuper	3
(Germany) Kadach Tuning + Service	12	(Germany) Wolf Henzler	All
(Germany) Kadach Tuning + Service	14	(Germany) Marco Seefried	All
(Germany) Kadach Tuning + Service	15	(United Kingdom) Richard Westbrook	1–8
(Germany) Kadach Tuning + Service	15	(Argentina) Martín Basso	10
(Germany) Kadach Tuning + Service	15	(United States) Will Langhorne	11
(Germany) Kadach Tuning + Service	16	(Austria) Thomas Bleiner	1–3, 5–11
(Germany) Kadach Tuning + Service	16	(France) Michel Neugarten	4
(Germany) Kadach Tuning + Service	17	(Monaco) Stéphane Ortelli	All
(Switzerland) Kwikpower XS Racing	18	(France) Emmanuel Collard	1–2, 4–7, 9–11
(Switzerland) Kwikpower XS Racing	18	(France) Xavier Pompidou	3
(Switzerland) Kwikpower XS Racing	18	(Germany) Christian Menzel	8
(Switzerland) Kwikpower XS Racing	19	(France) Cyrille Sauvage	All
(Germany) PZ Rhein-Oberberg/Jürgen Alzen	20	(Germany) Timo Bernhard	1–5, 7, 9–11
(Germany) PZ Rhein-Oberberg/Jürgen Alzen	20	(Germany) Marc Lieb	6
(Germany) PZ Rhein-Oberberg/Jürgen Alzen	20	(Romania) Dan Alexandrescu	8
(Germany) PZ Rhein-Oberberg/Jürgen Alzen	21	(Italy) Alessandro Zampedri	All
(Hungary) Bovi Motorsport	23	(Hungary) Istvan Racz	1–5, 7–10
(Hungary) Bovi Motorsport	24	(Hungary) Kálmán Bódis	1–5, 7–11
(Belgium) PSI Experience	25	(Finland) Markus Palttala	9
(Belgium) PSI Experience	26	(Belgium) Nicolas Kropp	9
(Germany) Tolimit Motorsport	25	(Germany) Christian Menzel	5
(United Kingdom) Team BCR	25	(United Kingdom) Mark Cole	6
(Germany) Carsport Supercup Team Swiss	25	(Switzerland) Benjamin Leuenberger	7
(Germany) Carsport Supercup Team Swiss	25	(United States) Wayne Jackson	7
(Germany) Carsport Supercup Team Swiss	26	(Switzerland) Bruno Staub	7, 10–11
(Germany) PZM - Team Valier	25	(Germany) Marc Gindorf	4
(United Kingdom) Redline Racing	26	(United Kingdom) Andrew Shelley	6
(Germany) Team HP-Phoenix - PZK	27	(Germany) Pierre Kaffer	5

== Race calendar and results ==
Round		Circuit	Country	Date	Pole position	Fastest lap	Winning driver	Winning team
1	R	(Italy) Autodromo Enzo e Dino Ferrari	Italy	14 April	(France) Emmanuel Collard	(Italy) Luca Riccitelli	(Italy) Luca Riccitelli	(Germany) Porsche AG
2	R	(Spain) Circuit de Catalunya	Spain	28 April	(Monaco) Stéphane Ortelli	(Monaco) Stéphane Ortelli	(Monaco) Stéphane Ortelli	(Germany) Kadach Tuning + Service
3	R	(Austria) A1 Ring	Austria	12 May	(Austria) Philipp Peter	(Austria) Philipp Peter	(Germany) Marco Werner	(Germany) Infineon-Team Farnbacher PZN
4	R	Circuit de Monaco	Monaco	26 May	(Austria) Philipp Peter	(France) Christophe Bouchut	(Austria) Philipp Peter	(Germany) Infineon-Team Farnbacher PZN
5	R	(Germany) Nürburgring	Germany	23 June	(Germany) Marco Werner	(Austria) Philipp Peter	(Austria) Philipp Peter	(Germany) Infineon-Team Farnbacher PZN
6	R	(United Kingdom) Silverstone Circuit	United Kingdom	7 July	(Monaco) Stéphane Ortelli	(Germany) Wolf Henzler	(Germany) Wolf Henzler	(Germany) Kadach Tuning + Service
7	R	(Germany) Hockenheimring	Germany	28 July	(Monaco) Stéphane Ortelli	(Germany) Marc Lieb	(Monaco) Stéphane Ortelli	(Germany) Kadach Tuning + Service
8	R	(Hungary) Hungaroring	Hungary	18 August	(Germany) Marco Werner	(Germany) Marco Werner	(Germany) Marco Werner	(Germany) Infineon-Team Farnbacher PZN
9^{1}	R	(Belgium) Circuit de Spa-Francorchamps	Belgium	1 September	(Monaco) Stéphane Ortelli	(Germany) Marc Lieb^{2}	(Monaco) Stéphane Ortelli	(Germany) Kadach Tuning + Service
10	R	(Italy) Autodromo Nazionale Monza	Italy	15 September	(Germany) Marco Werner	(France) Emmanuel Collard	(Germany) Marco Werner	(Germany) Infineon-Team Farnbacher PZN
11	R1	(United States) Indianapolis Motor Speedway	United States	28 September	(Australia) Alex Davison	(Australia) Alex Davison	(Australia) Alex Davison	(Germany) Software AG-Manthey Racing
11	R2	(United States) Indianapolis Motor Speedway	United States	29 September	(Germany) Wolf Henzler	(Australia) Alex Davison	(Germany) Wolf Henzler	(Germany) Kadach Tuning + Service

^{1} – Race was combined with Supercup and German Porsche Carrera Cup drivers.

^{2} – Marc Lieb recorded the overall fastest lap of the race but drove for the German series.

== Championship standings ==
Position	1st	2nd	3rd	4th	5th	6th	7th	8th	9th	10th	11th	12th	13th	14th	15th	Ref
Points	20	18	16	14	12	10	9	8	7	6	5	4	3	2	1	

Pos	Driver	IMO (Italy)	CAT (Spain)	A1R (Austria)	MON (Monaco)	NÜR (Germany)	SIL (United Kingdom)	HOC (Germany)	HUN (Hungary)	SPA (Belgium)	MNZ (Italy)	IND (United States)		Points
1	(Monaco) Stéphane Ortelli	7	**1**	3	Ret	7	**5**	**1**	3	**1**	6	3	8	164
2	(Germany) Marco Werner	11	6	1	3	**DNS**	10	Ret	**1**	5	**1**	4	5	142
3	(Germany) Timo Bernhard	5	9	2	Ret	4		3		Ret	4	2	2	127
4	(Germany) Wolf Henzler	6	3	Ret	2	DNS	1	Ret	7	8	9	8	**1**	121
5	(France) Christophe Bouchut	2	Ret	Ret	7	9	2	6	10	9	3	7	6	119
6	(Australia) Alex Davison	19	DNS	Ret	9	Ret	7	4	2	6	2	**1**	3	117
7	(Italy) Alessandro Zampedri	4	2	9	4	8	8	Ret	5	11	8	Ret	11	109
8	(Austria) Philipp Peter	Ret	4	**16**	**1**	1	Ret	Ret	4	10	18	5	4	105
9	(Germany) Marcel Tiemann	Ret	5	4	5	5	6	Ret	12	7	Ret	6	9	100
10	(France) Emmanuel Collard	**Ret**	8		6	6	4	5		4	5	Ret	7	99
11	(France) Cyrille Sauvage	12	Ret	5	11	10	12	Ret	6	2	7	10	10	90
12	(Germany) Marco Seefried	13	7	10	8	11	Ret	10	15	Ret	10	Ret	Ret	57
13	(Austria) Thomas Bleiner	14	11	11		Ret	15	Ret	17	14	12	12	19	44
14	(France) Roger Berville	16	Ret	13	16	14	16	14	20	17	14	13	15	43
15	(United Kingdom) Richard Westbrook	8	Ret	6	14	Ret	Ret	8	14					40
16	(Hungary) Istvan Racz	9	Ret	Ret	Ret	Ret		11	13	12	11			33
17	(Hungary) Kálmán Bódis	17	13	15	18	17		16	19	NC	17	14	21	30
18	(France) Michel Mora	15	Ret	Ret	17		17	13		15	16	17	20	37
19	(France) Jean-Luc Chéreau	18			15			15		16				12
guest drivers ineligible for championship points
	(Italy) Luca Riccitelli	1												0
	(Germany) Marc Lieb	3				2	3	2	9					0
	(Germany) Christian Menzel					3			11					0
	(Germany) Sascha Maassen									3				0
	(France) Xavier Pompidou			7										0
	(Switzerland) Benjamin Leuenberger							7						0
	(Germany) Mike Rockenfeller	10				12		Ret	8					0
	(Austria) Toto Wolff			8										0
	(Switzerland) Bruno Staub							9			Ret	9	14	0
	(United Kingdom) Darren Manning						9							0
	(Spain) Emilio de Villota		10											0
	(Japan) Ryo Fukuda				10									0
	(Republic of Ireland) Damien Faulkner						11							0
	(United States) Bill Adam											11	13	0
	(France) Jack Leconte		12	12		15	18		18		15	18	16	0
	(France) Luc Alphand				12									0
	(Switzerland) Peter Wyss							12						0
	(United States) Will Langhorne											Ret	12	0
	(Germany) Marc Gindorf				13									0
	(Germany) Mark Warnecke					13								0
	(United Kingdom) Mark Cole						13							0
	(Belgium) Nicolas Kropp									13				0
	(Italy) Daniele Massaro										13			0
	(Austria) Hubert Neuper			14										0
	(United Kingdom) Andrew Shelley						14							0
	(United States) Wayne Jackson											15	17	0
	(France) Alain Muraour					16			21					0
	(Hungary) Attila Barta								16					0
	(United States) Antonio Sabato Jr.											16	18	0
	(Germany) Katja Poensgen					18								0
	(Romania) Dan Alexandrescu								22					0
	(France) Michel Neugarten				DNS				Ret					0
	(Austria) Gustl Auinger			Ret										0
	(Austria) Heinz Kinigadner			Ret										0
	(Netherlands) Roeland Voermann				Ret									0
	(Germany) Pierre Kaffer					Ret								0
	(Germany) Christoph Langen							Ret						0
	(Belgium) Marc Duez									Ret				0
	(Netherlands) Patrick Huisman									Ret				0
	(Finland) Markus Palttala									Ret				0
	(Argentina) Martín Basso										Ret			0
	(Italy) Luigi Moccia	DNS												0
	(Spain) Jesus Diez de Villarroel		DNS											0
Pos	Driver	IMO (Italy)	CAT (Spain)	A1R (Austria)	MON (Monaco)	NÜR (Germany)	SIL (United Kingdom)	HOC (Germany)	HUN (Hungary)	SPA (Belgium)	MNZ (Italy)	IND (United States)		Points

Colour	Result
Gold	Winner
Silver	Second place
Bronze	Third place
Green	Points classification
Blue	Non-points classification
Blue	Non-classified finish (NC)
Purple	Retired, not classified (Ret)
Red	Did not qualify (DNQ)
Red	Did not pre-qualify (DNPQ)
Black	Disqualified (DSQ)
White	Did not start (DNS)
White	Withdrew (WD)
White	Race cancelled (C)
Blank	Did not practice (DNP)
Blank	Did not arrive (DNA)
Blank	Excluded (EX)

**Bold** – Pole
Italics – Fastest Lap
