= 2003 Porsche Supercup =

11th Porsche Supercup season

Seasons
- ← 2002 2004 →

The 2003 Porsche Michelin Supercup season was the 11th Porsche Supercup season. The races were all supporting races in the 2003 Formula One season. It travelled to ten circuits across Europe and a double-header at Indianapolis, USA.

== Teams and drivers ==
Team	No.	Drivers	Rounds
(Germany) Porsche AG	1	(Italy) Ivan Capelli	1
(Germany) Porsche AG	1	(Venezuela) Milka Duno	2
(Germany) Porsche AG	1	(Austria) Thomas Muster	3
(Germany) Porsche AG	1	(Brazil) Ricardo Zonta	4
(Germany) Porsche AG	1	(Germany) Uwe Alzen	5
(Germany) Porsche AG	1	(France) Sebastien Dumez	6
(Germany) Porsche AG	1	(New Zealand) Aaron Slight	7
(Germany) Porsche AG	1	(Germany) Katja Poensgen	8
(Germany) Porsche AG	1	(Hungary) Istvan Racz	9
(Germany) Porsche AG	1	(Italy) Rinaldo Capello	10
(Germany) Porsche AG	1	(United States) Travis Pastrana	11
(Germany) Porsche AG	2	(Italy) Luigi Moccia	1
(Germany) Porsche AG	2	(Spain) Sito Pons	2
(Germany) Porsche AG	2	(Austria) Hans Knauß	3
(Germany) Porsche AG	2	(France) David Hallyday	4
(Germany) Porsche AG	2	(Germany) Christoph Langen	5
(Germany) Porsche AG	2	(France) Romain Dumas	6
(Germany) Porsche AG	2	(United Kingdom) Robbie Kerr	7
(Germany) Porsche AG	2	(Germany) Richy Müller	8
(Germany) Porsche AG	2	(Hungary) Gábor Wéber	9
(Germany) Porsche AG	2	(Germany) Sascha Maassen	10
(Germany) Porsche AG	2	(United States) Kim Wolfkill	11
(Germany) UPS Porsche-Junior Team	28	(Germany) Mike Rockenfeller	4-5, 7-8, 10
(Germany) UPS Porsche-Junior Team	29	(United States) Patrick Long	4-5, 7-8, 10
(Germany) Aqua Nova Racing Team Kadach	3	(Germany) Wolf Henzler	All
(Germany) Aqua Nova Racing Team Kadach	4	(Germany) Marco Seefried	2-7
(Germany) Aqua Nova Racing Team Kadach	4	(Romania) Janos Kirko	8
(Germany) Aqua Nova Racing Team Kadach	4	(United States) Antonio Sabato Jr.	11
(Germany) Aqua Nova Racing Team Kadach	26	(Italy) Steffano Buttiero	4
(Germany) Aqua Nova Racing Team Kadach	46	(Germany) Ellen Lohr	All
(Germany) Infineon Team Farnbacher PZM	5	(Germany) Frank Stippler	All
(Germany) Infineon Team Farnbacher PZM	6	(Germany) Pierre Kaffer	All
(Germany) Infineon Team Farnbacher PZM	7	(Germany) Tim Bergmeister	3-10
(Germany) Infineon Team Farnbacher PZM	7	(Australia) Marcus Marshall	11
(Netherlands) Team Bleekemolen	8	(Netherlands) Michael Bleekemolen	All
(Netherlands) Team Bleekemolen	9	(Netherlands) Sebastiaan Bleekemolen	3-8, 11
(Netherlands) Team Bleekemolen	9	(Netherlands) Roeland Voermann	10
(Netherlands) Team Bleekemolen	9	(Netherlands) Pim Van Riet	9
(Netherlands) Team Bleekemolen	10	(Netherlands) Pim Van Riet	11
(Italy) Conrero Squadra Corse	11	(Italy) Luca Riccitelli	1-4
(Italy) Conrero Squadra Corse	11	(Italy) Felice Tedeschi	5-7
(Italy) Conrero Squadra Corse	11	(Italy) Gabriele Lancieri	8
(Italy) Conrero Squadra Corse	11	(France) Emmanuel Collard	9-10
(Italy) Conrero Squadra Corse	11	(France) Cyrille Sauvage	11
(Italy) Conrero Squadra Corse	12	(Italy) Angelo Lancelotti	1-10
(Italy) Conrero Squadra Corse	12	(France) Xavier Pompidou	11
Team Slovakia	15	(Slovakia) Miro Konôpka	1-4, 6-9, 11
Team Slovakia	16	(Slovakia) Andrej Studenic	All
(Austria) Walter Lechner Racing School Team	17	(Austria) Walter Lechner Jr.	All
(Austria) Walter Lechner Racing School Team	18	(Austria) Toto Wolff	1, 3
(Austria) Walter Lechner Racing School Team	18	(Australia) Alex Davison	2
(Austria) Walter Lechner Racing School Team	18	(Monaco) Stéphane Ortelli	4, 6-10
(Austria) Walter Lechner Racing School Team	18	(Germany) Roland Asch	5
(Austria) Walter Lechner Racing School Team	18	(Germany) Klaus Graf	11
(Germany) DeWalt Racing/PZRO-JAM	19	(Austria) Thomas Bleiner	1-3, 5-7, 9-10
(Germany) DeWalt Racing/PZRO-JAM	19	(Germany) Klaus Abbelen	4
(Germany) DeWalt Racing/PZRO-JAM	20	(Netherlands) Patrick Huisman	All
(Germany) DeWalt Racing/PZRO-JAM	21	(Italy) Alessandro Zampedri	All
(Germany) Tolimit Motorsport	22	(Germany) Klaus Graf	2-5, 8, 10
(Germany) Tolimit Motorsport	24	(Germany) Sascha Maassen	4
(Germany) Tolimit Motorsport	24	(Germany) Maik Heupel	5, 7-8
(Germany) Tolimit Motorsport	24	(Germany) Christian Menzel	3
(Germany) Tolimit Motorsport	25	(Germany) Christian Menzel	5, 8, 10?
(Germany) Tolimit Motorsport	25	(United Kingdom) Paula Cook	4, 7
(Germany) Arkenau Motorsport	23	(Germany) Oliver Freymuth	2-4, 6, 8, 10-11
(Germany) Land-Motorsport PZ Siegen	25	(Germany) Peter Scharmach	11
(Germany) Land-Motorsport PZ Siegen	26	(Germany) Albert Daffner	11
(United Kingdom) Porsche Cars Great Britain	30	(United Kingdom) Andy Britnell	5, 7
(United Kingdom) Porsche Cars Great Britain	31	(United Kingdom) Gary Britnell	5, 7
(United Kingdom) Porsche Cars Great Britain	32	(United Kingdom) Barry Horne	5, 7
(United Kingdom) Porsche Cars Great Britain	33	(United Kingdom) Jonathan Cocker	7
(United Kingdom) Porsche Cars Great Britain	34	(United Kingdom) David Pinkney	7
(United Kingdom) Porsche Cars Great Britain	35	(United Kingdom) Richard Westbrook	7
(Hungary) Bovi Motorsport	3x	(Hungary) Kálmán Bódis	9

== Race calendar and results ==
Round		Circuit	Country	Date	Pole position	Fastest lap	Winning driver	Winning team
1	R	(Italy) Autodromo Enzo e Dino Ferrari	Italy	19 April	(Germany) Frank Stippler	(Italy) Luca Riccitelli	(Germany) Pierre Kaffer	(Germany) Infineon Team Farnbacher PZM
2	R	(Spain) Circuit de Catalunya	Spain	4 May	(Germany) Pierre Kaffer	(Germany) Pierre Kaffer	(Germany) Pierre Kaffer	(Germany) Infineon Team Farnbacher PZM
3	R	(Austria) A1 Ring	Austria	18 May	(Germany) Frank Stippler	(Germany) Frank Stippler	(Germany) Frank Stippler	(Germany) Infineon Team Farnbacher PZM
4	R	Circuit de Monaco	Monaco	1 June	(Germany) Frank Stippler	(Germany) Frank Stippler	(Germany) Wolf Henzler	(Germany) Aqua Nova Racing Team Kadach
5	R	(Germany) Nürburgring	Germany	29 June	(United States) Patrick Long	(Germany) Roland Asch	(Germany) Mike Rockenfeller	(Germany) Porsche AG
6	R	(France) Circuit de Nevers Magny-Cours	France	6 July	(Germany) Wolf Henzler	(Germany) Pierre Kaffer	(Germany) Wolf Henzler	(Germany) Infineon Team Farnbacher PZM
7	R	(United Kingdom) Silverstone Circuit	United Kingdom	20 July	(Netherlands) Patrick Huisman	(Germany) Frank Stippler	(Germany) Frank Stippler	(Germany) Infineon Team Farnbacher PZM
8	R	(Germany) Hockenheimring	Germany	3 August	(Germany) Frank Stippler	(Germany) Frank Stippler	(Germany) Frank Stippler	(Germany) Infineon Team Farnbacher PZM
9	R	(Hungary) Hungaroring	Hungary	24 August	(Germany) Frank Stippler	(Netherlands) Patrick Huisman	(Germany) Frank Stippler	(Germany) Infineon Team Farnbacher PZM
10	R	(Italy) Autodromo Nazionale Monza	Italy	14 September	(Germany) Mike Rockenfeller	(United States) Patrick Long	(Germany) Frank Stippler	(Germany) Infineon Team Farnbacher PZM
11	R1	(United States) Indianapolis Motor Speedway	United States	27 September	(Netherlands) Patrick Huisman	(Netherlands) Sebastiaan Bleekemolen	(Netherlands) Patrick Huisman	(Germany) DeWalt Racing/PZRO-JAM
11	R2	(United States) Indianapolis Motor Speedway	United States	28 September	(Germany) Wolf Henzler	(Austria) Walter Lechner Jr.	(Germany) Wolf Henzler	(Germany) Infineon Team Farnbacher PZM

== Championship standings ==
Position	1st	2nd	3rd	4th	5th	6th	7th	8th	9th	10th	11th	12th	13th	14th	15th	Ref
Points	20	18	16	14	12	10	9	8	7	6	5	4	3	2	1	

Pos	Driver	IMO (Italy)	CAT (Spain)	A1R (Austria)	MON (Monaco)	NÜR (Germany)	MAG (France)	SIL (United Kingdom)	HOC (Germany)	HUN (Hungary)	MZA (Italy)	IND (United States)		Points
1	(Germany) Frank Stippler	**Ret**	2	**1**	**13**	3	6	1	**1**	**1**	1	DSQ	2	172
2	(Germany) Wolf Henzler	8	3	4	1	4	**1**	6	6	5	DSQ	Ret	**1**	156
3	(Germany) Pierre Kaffer	1	**1**	2	Ret	5	4	5	4	2	2	Ret	DSQ	154
4	(Netherlands) Patrick Huisman	3	19	7	4	8	3	**Ret**	3	4	DSQ	**1**	3	138
5	(Austria) Walter Lechner Jr.	5	7	3	8	11	9	7	18†	6	5	Ret	5	119
6	(Italy) Alessandro Zampedri	Ret	8	8	Ret	16	7	8	9	3	Ret	2	4	99
7	(Slovakia) Andrej Studenic	14	12	15	7	15	10	16	11	13	9	8	17†	80
8	(Germany) Klaus Graf		4	6	14†	7			2		Ret	Ret	8	73
9	(Netherlands) Sebastiaan Bleekemolen	6	9	11	Ret	13	14	11	8			6	Ret	70
10	(Netherlands) Michael Bleekemolen	11	14	18	9	17	12	13	12	11	Ret	7	11	68
11	(Germany) Ellen Lohr	13	13	13	Ret	Ret	11	15	Ret	12	8	14	9	63
12	(Germany) Tim Bergmeister			9	Ret	9	5	10	7	10	Ret			60
13	(Italy) Angelo Lancelotti	10	11	12	Ret	20	13	Ret	10	9	Ret			45
14	(Germany) Oliver Freymuth		Ret	21	12		16		13		12	13	13	38
15	(Netherlands) Evert Kroon	15	18	20	11	23	18	22		15	10			33
16	(Slovakia) Miro Konôpka	16	17	19	Ret		17	21	15	16		16	16	29
17	(Austria) Thomas Bleiner	12	15	16		18	Ret	23		Ret	Ret			19
drivers removed from standings due to entering less than six races
	(Monaco) Stéphane Ortelli				2		2	3	20†	7	Ret			46
	(Italy) Luca Riccitelli	2	5	10	Ret									37
	(Germany) Marco Seefried		10	Ret	6	22	19	12						27
	(Italy) Steffano Buttiero				5									16
	(Austria) Toto Wolff	9		14										12
	(Italy) Felice Tedeschi					19	15	19						8
guest drivers ineligible for championship points
	(Germany) Mike Rockenfeller				Ret	1		2	5		**Ret**			0
	(United States) Patrick Long				3	**2**		4	Ret		7			0
	(Germany) Sascha Maassen				Ret						3			0
	(France) Cyrille Sauvage											3	7	0
	(Italy) Luigi Moccia	4												0
	(Italy) Rinaldo Capello										4			0
	(France) Xavier Pompidou											4	Ret	0
	(Germany) Christian Menzel			5		21			Ret		6			0
	(Australia) Marcus Marshall											5	6	0
	(Australia) Alex Davison		6											0
	(Germany) Roland Asch					6								0
	(Italy) Ivan Capelli	7												0
	(France) Sébastien Dumez						8							0
	(Hungary) Istvan Racz									8				0
	(United Kingdom) Richard Westbrook							9						0
	(Netherlands) Pim van Riet									14		9	10	0
	(France) David Hallyday				10									0
	(Germany) Maik Heupel					10		Ret	Ret					0
	(United States) Kim Wolfkill											10	15	0
	(Netherlands) Roeland Voerman										11			0
	(Germany) Albert Daffner											11	14	0
	(Germany) Uwe Alzen					12								0
	(Germany) Peter Scharmach											12	12	0
	(United Kingdom) Barry Horne					14		14						0
	(Italy) Gabriele Lancieri								14					0
	(United States) Travis Pastrana											15	Ret	0
	(Venezuela) Milka Duno		16											0
	(Germany) Richy Müller								16					0
	(Austria) Hans Knauß			17										0
	(United Kingdom) David Pinkney							17						0
	(Germany) Katja Poensgen								17					0
	(Hungary) Kálmán Bódis									17				0
	(New Zealand) Aaron Slight							18						0
	(Romania) Janos Kurko								19					0
	(United Kingdom) Andy Britnell					Ret		20						0
	(Germany) Christoph Langen					24								0
	(United Kingdom) Paula Cook				Ret			24†						0
	(United Kingdom) Gary Britnell					25		Ret						0
	(United Kingdom) Robbie Kerr							25						0
	(France) Emmanuel Collard									Ret	Ret			0
	(Spain) Sito Pons		Ret											0
	(Austria) Thomas Muster			Ret										0
	(Germany) Klaus Abbelen				Ret									0
	(Brazil) Ricardo Zonta				Ret									0
	(France) Romain Dumas						Ret							0
	(United Kingdom) Jonathan Cocker							Ret						0
	(Hungary) Gábor Wéber									Ret				0
	(United States) Antonio Sabato Jr.											DNS	DNS	0
Pos	Driver	IMO (Italy)	CAT (Spain)	A1R (Austria)	MON (Monaco)	NÜR (Germany)	MAG (France)	SIL (United Kingdom)	HOC (Germany)	HUN (Hungary)	MZA (Italy)	IND (United States)		Points

Colour	Result
Gold	Winner
Silver	Second place
Bronze	Third place
Green	Points classification
Blue	Non-points classification
Blue	Non-classified finish (NC)
Purple	Retired, not classified (Ret)
Red	Did not qualify (DNQ)
Red	Did not pre-qualify (DNPQ)
Black	Disqualified (DSQ)
White	Did not start (DNS)
White	Withdrew (WD)
White	Race cancelled (C)
Blank	Did not practice (DNP)
Blank	Did not arrive (DNA)
Blank	Excluded (EX)

**Bold** – Pole
Italics – Fastest Lap

† — Drivers did not finish the race, but were classified as they completed over 90% of the race distance.
