= Stéphane Ortelli =

Monégasque-French racing driver

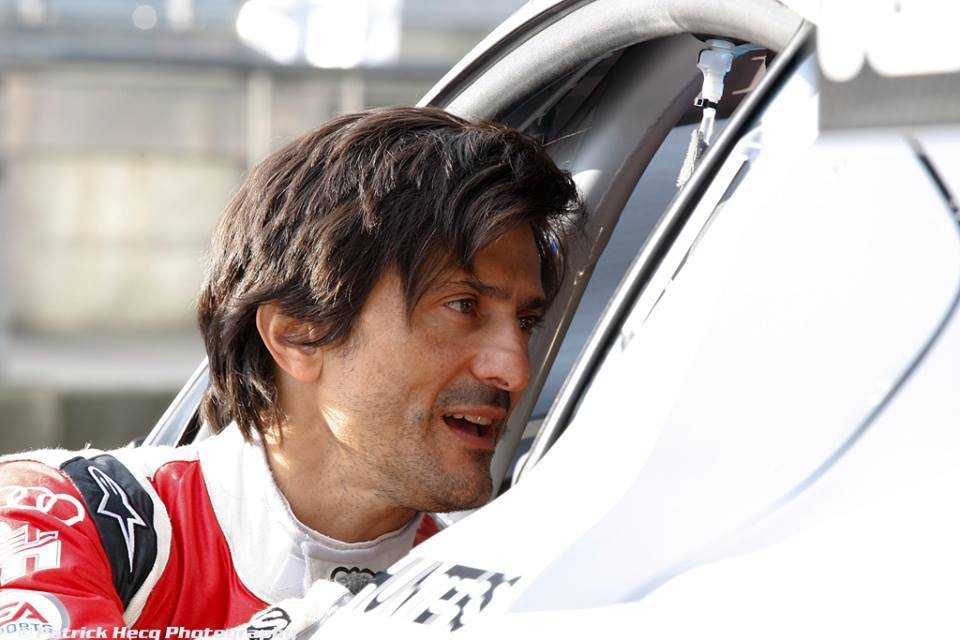
- Nationality: (Monaco) Monégasque (France) French
- Born: 30 March 1970 (age 56) Hyères, Var, France
- Categorisation: FIA Platinum (until 2019); FIA Gold (2020–)

24 Hours of Le Mans career
- Years: 1995 – 2002, 2004 – 2007, 2009 - 2011
- Teams: Larbre Compétition; New Hardware Racing/Parr Motorsport; Roock Racing; Porsche AG; Audi Sport UK; Audi Sport Team Joest; Team Bentley; Pescarolo Sport; Freisinger Motorsport; Audi PlayStation Team Oreca; Aston Martin Racing; Team Oreca Matmut; AF Corse; Luxury Racing
- Best finish: 1st (1998)
- Class wins: 1 (1998)

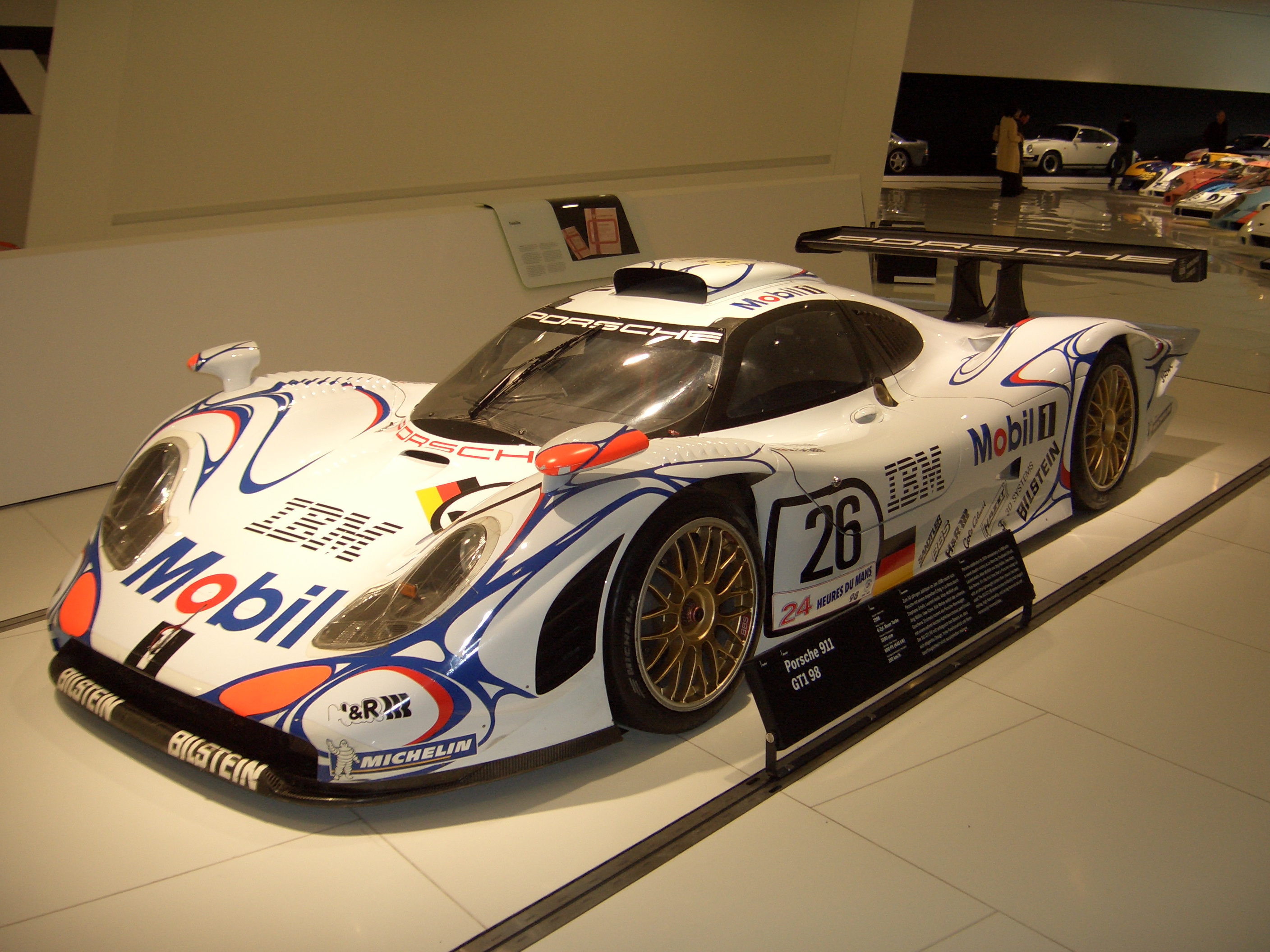
Winning Porsche 911 GT1 #26 of the 24h of Le Mans 1998 in display at the Porsche Museum, Stuttgart.

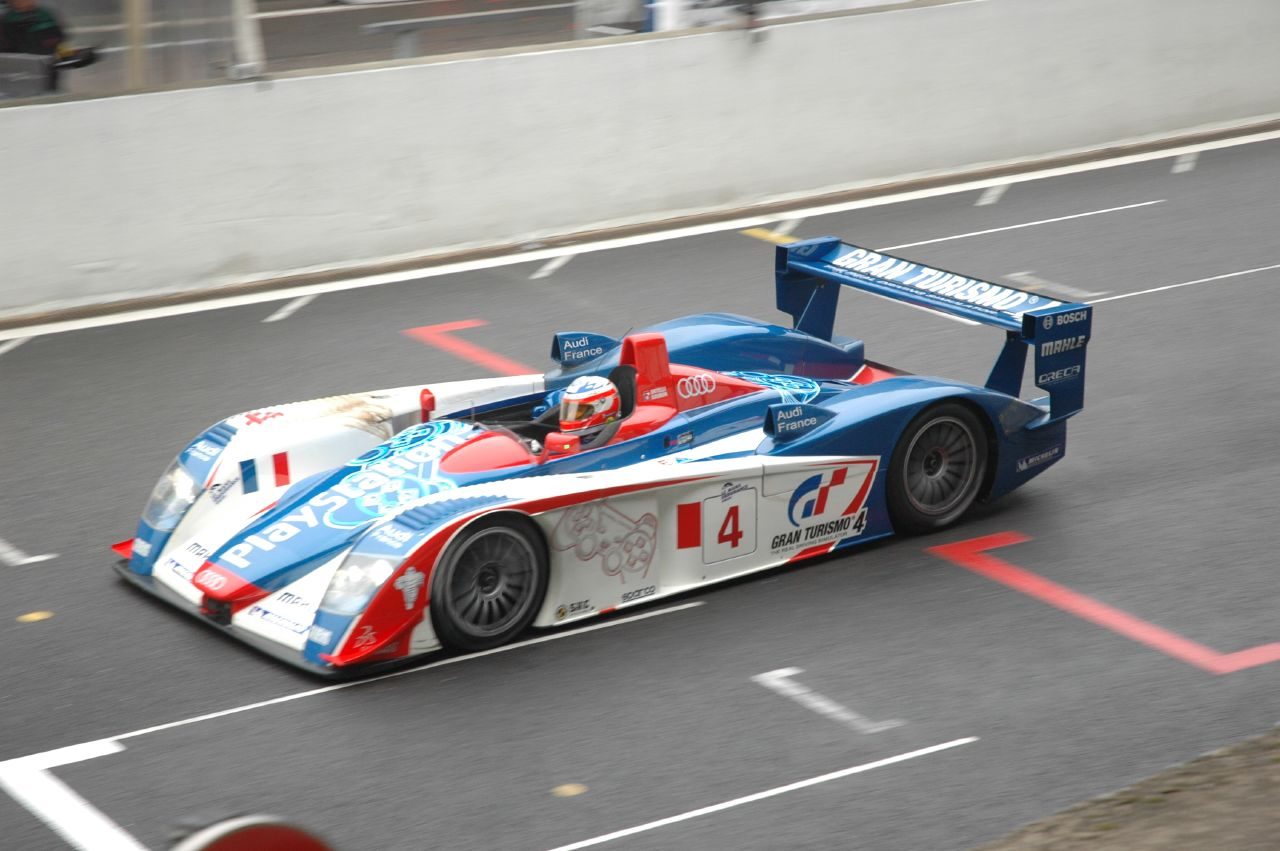
The Audi R8 Oreca #4 at Spa in 2005

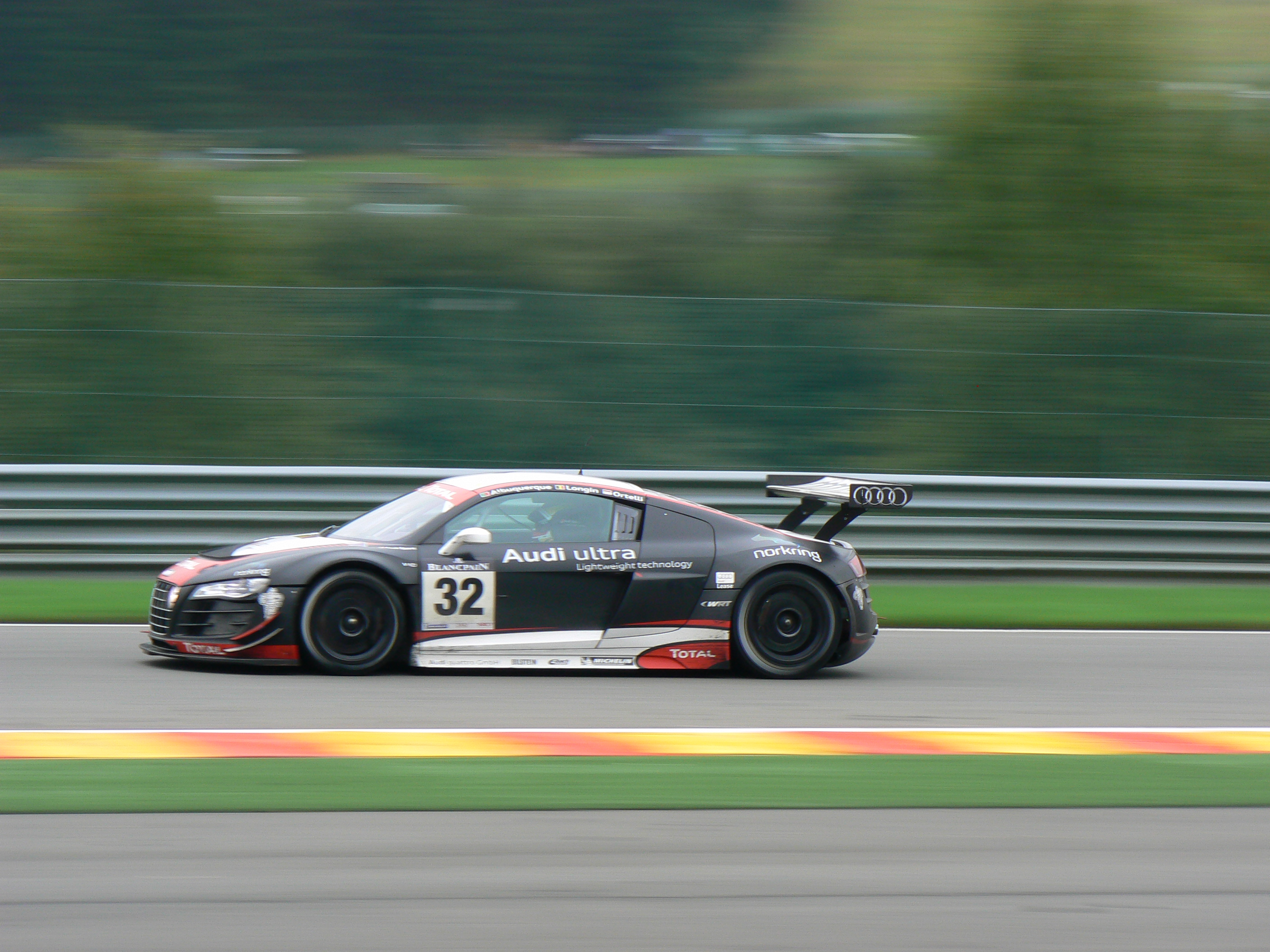
The Audi R8 #32 at Spa in 2011

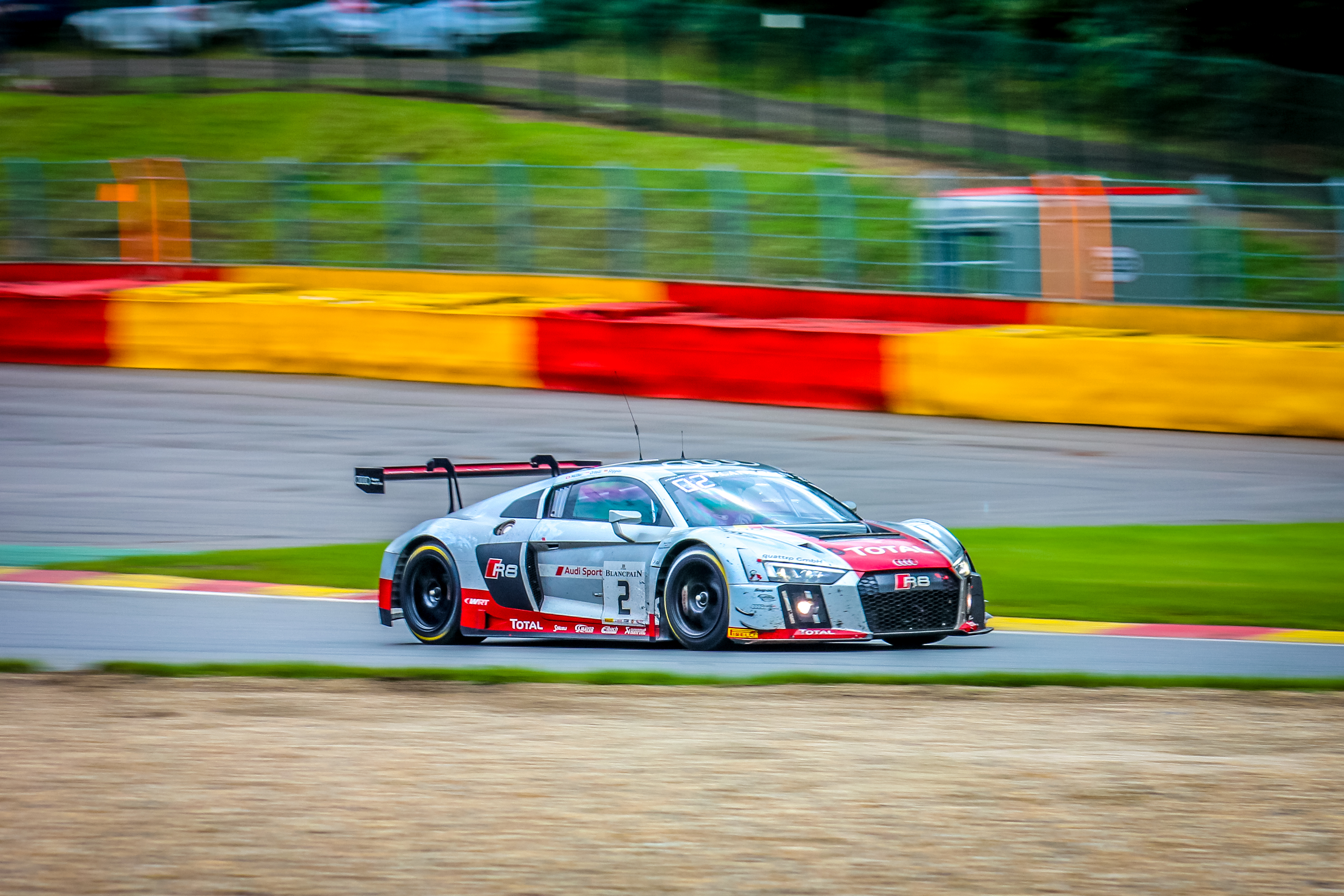
Audi R8 LMS #2 at Spa in 2015

Stéphane Ortelli (born 30 March 1970) is a Monégasque and French professional racing driver.

As a Porsche driver, Ortelli won the 24 Hours of Le Mans race in 1998 with Allan McNish and Laurent Aïello, and the Spa 24 Hours in 2003 with Romain Dumas and Marc Lieb. He also won Porsche Supercup in 2002, the FIA GT Championship's N-GT class in 2002 and 2003, and the Porsche Cup, an annual award presented by Porsche AG to recognise the world's most successful privateer Porsche driver, in 2004. Ortelli later won the GT1 class of the 12 Hours of Sebring in 2005 (in an Aston Martin DBR9) and the Le Mans Series in 2007 (in a Saleen S7-R).

As an Audi driver, Ortelli drove for both the factory Audi Sport Team Joest and the privateer Audi PlayStation Team Oreca in LMP1, placing 2nd and 4th at Le Mans in 2000 and 2005 respectively. He also won the Blancpain Endurance Series in 2012 with Christopher Mies and Christopher Haase, and the FIA GT Series in 2013 with Laurens Vanthoor. Ortelli spent the last few seasons of his career at Emil Frey Racing, with Jaguar and Lexus.

== Career ==
- 1995: Winner of Supertouring Criterium BMW/Oreca / 5 victories
- 1998: Winner of 24 Hours of Le Mans, Porsche 911 GT1-98
- 2002: Winner of Porsche Supercup 3 victories & 4 podiums
- 2002: Winner of FIA GT World Championship N-GT class Porsche 911 GT3-RS / 7 victories & 1 podium
- 2003: Winner of FIA GT World Championship N-GT class Porsche 911 GT3-RS / 3 victories & 3 podiums
- 2003: Winner of Spa 24 Hours Porsche 911 GT3-RS
- 2004: Winner of Porsche Cup / 5 victories & 7 podiums
- 2005: Winner of 12 Hours of Sebring in GT1 Class with Prodrive Aston Martin DBR9.
- 2005: World Touring Car Championship with Team Oreca (SEAT Toledo)
- 2005: Le Mans Series with Audi PlayStation Team Oreca (Audi R8) / 1 Win
- 2005: 24 Hours of Le Mans with Audi PlayStation Team ORECA (Audi R8) / 4th Overall
- 2006: Le Mans Series with Team Oreca (Saleen S7R) / 2 Victories
- 2007: Winner of Le Mans Series with Team Oreca (Saleen S7R)
- 2007: FIA GT Championship GT2 class with AF Corse (Ferrari F430)
- 2012: Winner of Blancpain Endurance Series with Belgian Audi Club Team WRT (Audi R8 LMS ultra)
- 2013: Winner of Blancpain Sprint Series/2013 FIA GT Series season with Belgian Audi Club Team WRT (Audi R8 LMS ultra)
- 2014: 3rd overall of Blancpain Endurance Series with Saintéloc Racing (Audi R8 LMS ultra)
- 2015: 3rd overall of Blancpain Endurance Series with Belgian Audi Club Team WRT (Audi R8 LMS ultra)
- 2015: Winner of the Sepang 12 Hours with Belgian Audi Club Team WRT (Audi R8 LMS)

=== Monza Le Mans Series 2008 crash ===
On 27 April 2008, during a Le Mans Series race at the Monza circuit, a mechanic issue caused Ortelli's Courage car to slide and spin onto the grass. This in turn instigated a cartwheeling motion upon the vehicle, which resulted in most of the car's bodywork and all but one wheel being torn off before it came to rest on the opposite side of the track. It narrowly missed the tail of Allan McNish's Audi R10 which was in front. Ortelli sustained a broken ankle as a result.

== Career results ==
=== 24 Hours of Le Mans results ===
Year	Team	Co-Drivers	Car	Class	Laps	Pos.	Class Pos.
1995	(France) Larbre Compétition	(France) Dominique Dupuy (France) Emmanuel Collard	Porsche 911 GT2 Evo	GT1	82	DNF	DNF
1996	(New Zealand) New Hardware Racing (United Kingdom) Parr Motorsport	(United States) Andy Pilgrim (New Zealand) Andrew Bagnall	Porsche 911 GT2	GT2	299	17th	4th
1997	(Germany) Roock Racing	(United Kingdom) Allan McNish (Austria) Karl Wendlinger	Porsche 911 GT1	GT1	8	DNF	DNF
1998	(Germany) Porsche AG	(France) Laurent Aïello (United Kingdom) Allan McNish	Porsche 911 GT1-98	GT1	351	**1st**	**1st**
1999	(United Kingdom) Audi Sport UK Ltd.	(Sweden) Stefan Johansson (Germany) Christian Abt	Audi R8C	LMGTP	55	DNF	DNF
2000	(Germany) Audi Sport Team Joest	(France) Laurent Aïello (United Kingdom) Allan McNish	Audi R8	LMP900	367	**2nd**	**2nd**
2001	(United Kingdom) Team Bentley	(United Kingdom) Martin Brundle (United Kingdom) Guy Smith	Bentley EXP Speed 8	LMGTP	56	DNF	DNF
2002	(France) Pescarolo Sport	(France) Éric Hélary (Japan) Ukyo Katayama	Courage C60-Peugeot	LMP900	144	DNF	DNF
2004	(Germany) Freisinger Motorsport	(Germany) Ralf Kelleners (France) Romain Dumas	Porsche 911 GT3-RSR	GT	321	13th	**3rd**
2005	(France) Audi PlayStation Team Oreca	(France) Franck Montagny (France) Jean-Marc Gounon	Audi R8	LMP1	362	4th	4th
2006	(United Kingdom) Aston Martin Racing	(Portugal) Pedro Lamy (France) Stéphane Sarrazin	Aston Martin DBR9	GT1	342	10th	5th
2007	(France) Team Oreca	(France) Soheil Ayari (France) Nicolas Lapierre	Saleen S7-R	GT1	318	16th	9th
2009	(France) Team Oreca-Matmut AIM	(Brazil) Bruno Senna (Portugal) Tiago Monteiro	Oreca 01-AIM	LMP1	219	DNF	DNF
2011	(France) Luxury Racing	(France) Frédéric Makowiecki (Brazil) Jaime Melo	Ferrari 458 Italia GTC	GTE; Pro	183	DNF	DNF

=== Partial Porsche Supercup results ===
(key) (Races in bold indicate pole position) (Races in italics indicate fastest lap)

Year	Team	Car	1	2	3	4	5	6	7	8	9	10	11	12	DC	Points
2002	Kadach Tuning + Service	Porsche 996 GT3	ITA; 7	**ESP**; 1	AUT; 3	MON; Ret	GER; 7	**GBR**; 5	**GER**; 1	HUN; 3	**BEL**; 1	ITA; 6	USA; 3	USA; 8	**1st**	**164**
2003	Walter Lechner Racing School Team	Porsche 996 GT3	ITA	ESP	AUT	MON; 2	GER	FRA; 2	GBR; 3	GER; 20†	HUN; 7	ITA; Ret	USA	USA	NC‡	0‡
2005	Porsche AG	Porsche 997 GT3	ITA	ESP	MON; 2	GER	USA	USA	FRA	GBR	GER	HUN	ITA	BEL	NC‡	0‡

† — Did not finish the race, but was classified as he completed over 90% of the race distance.

‡ — Not eligible for points.

=== Complete World Touring Car Championship results ===
(key) (Races in bold indicate pole position) (Races in italics indicate fastest lap)

Year	Team	Car	1	2	3	4	5	6	7	8	9	10	11	12	13	14	15	16	17	18	19	20	DC	Points
2005	Team Oreca PlayStation	SEAT Toledo Cupra	ITA; 1	ITA; 2	FRA; 1	FRA; 2	GBR; 1	GBR; 2	SMR; 1	SMR; 2	MEX; 1	MEX; 2	BEL; 1	BEL; 2	GER; 1; 6	GER; 2; 15	TUR; 1 Ret	TUR; 2 Ret	ESP; 1; 9	ESP; 2; 22	MAC; 1	MAC; 2	20th	3

=== FIA GT competition results ===
==== Complete GT1 World Championship results ====
Year	Team	Car	1	2	3	4	5	6	7	8	9	10	11	12	13	14	15	16	17	18	Pos	Points
2012	Belgian Audi Club Team WRT	Audi	NOG; QR; 1	NOG; CR; 1	ZOL; QR; 12	ZOL; CR; 6	NAV; QR; 9	NAV; QR; 10	SVK; QR; 11	SVK; CR; 6	ALG; QR; 10	ALG; CR; 6	SVK; QR; 5	SVK; CR; 5	MOS; QR; 1	MOS; CR; 4	NUR; QR; 2	NUR; CR; 6	DON; QR	DON; CR	5th	104

=== Complete FIA GT Series results ===
Year	Team	Car	Class	1	2	3	4	5	6	7	8	9	10	11	12	Pos.	Points
2013	Belgian Audi Club Team WRT	Audi R8 LMS ultra	Pro	NOG; QR; 16	NOG; CR; 2	ZOL; QR; 1	**ZOL**; **CR**; 2	ZAN; QR; 1	**ZAN**; **CR**; 2	SVK; QR; 2	SVK; CR; 3	NAV; QR; 7	NAV; CR; 15	BAK; QR; 2	BAK; CR; 1	**1st**	**132**

=== Complete Blancpain GT World Challenge Europe results ===
(key) (Races in bold indicate pole position) (Races in italics indicate fastest lap)

Year	Team	Car	Class	1	2	3	4	5	6	7	8	9	10	11	12	13	14	Pos.	Points
2014	G-Drive Racing	Audi R8 LMS ultra	Pro	NOG; QR; 4	NOG; CR; 2	BRH; QR; Ret	BRH; CR; 13	ZAN; QR; 9	ZAN; CR; Ret									7th	54
2014	Belgian Audi Club Team WRT	Audi R8 LMS ultra	Pro							SVK; QR; 12	SVK; CR; Ret	ALG; QR; 17	ALG; CR; 3	ZOL; QR; 23	ZOL; CR; 10	**BAK**; **QR**; 3	BAK; CR; 4	7th	54
2015	Belgian Audi Club Team WRT	Audi R8 LMS ultra	Pro	**NOG**; **QR**; 1	NOG; CR; 2	BRH; QR; 11	BRH; CR; 7	ZOL; QR; Ret	ZOL; CR; 10	MOS; QR; 9	MOS; CR; 4	ALG; QR; 15	ALG; CR; 5	MIS; QR; 5	MIS; CR; 7	ZAN; QR; 5	ZAN; CR; 5	6th	76
2017	Emil Frey Lexus Racing	Lexus RC F GT3	Pro	MIS; QR	MIS; CR	BRH; QR	BRH; CR	ZOL; QR	ZOL; CR	HUN; QR	HUN; CR	NÜR; QR; 22	NÜR; CR; 21					NC	0
2018	Emil Frey Lexus Racing	Lexus RC F GT3	Pro	ZOL; 1; 14	ZOL; 2; 13	BRH; 1; 9	BRH; 2; 9	MIS; 1; 5	MIS; 2; 8	HUN; 1	HUN; 2	NÜR; 1	NÜR; 2					19th	10
2019	Saintéloc Racing	Audi R8 LMS	Pro-Am	BRH; 1 DNS	BRH; 2 DNS	**MIS**; **1**; 13	MIS; 2; 19	**ZAN**; **1**; 21	ZAN; 2; 21									7th	40.5
2019	Saintéloc Racing	Audi R8 LMS	Pro							NÜR; 1; 16	NÜR; 2; 11	HUN; 1; 15	HUN; 2; 17					NC	0

Sporting positions
Preceded by Michele Alboreto; Stefan Johansson; Tom Kristensen	Winner of the 24 Hours of Le Mans; 1998; With: Laurent Aïello & Allan McNish	Succeeded by Pierluigi Martini; Yannick Dalmas; Joachim Winkelhock
Preceded by Jörg Bergmeister	Porsche Supercup; Champion; 2002	Succeeded by Frank Stippler
Preceded by Greg Franchi	Blancpain Endurance Series; Champion; 2012; With: Christopher Mies & Christopher Haase	Succeeded by Maximilian Buhk
Preceded by None	FIA GT Series; 2013; With: Laurens Vanthoor	Succeeded by Maximilian Götz (Blancpain Sprint Series)
