= Pierre Kaffer =

German racing driver (born 1976)

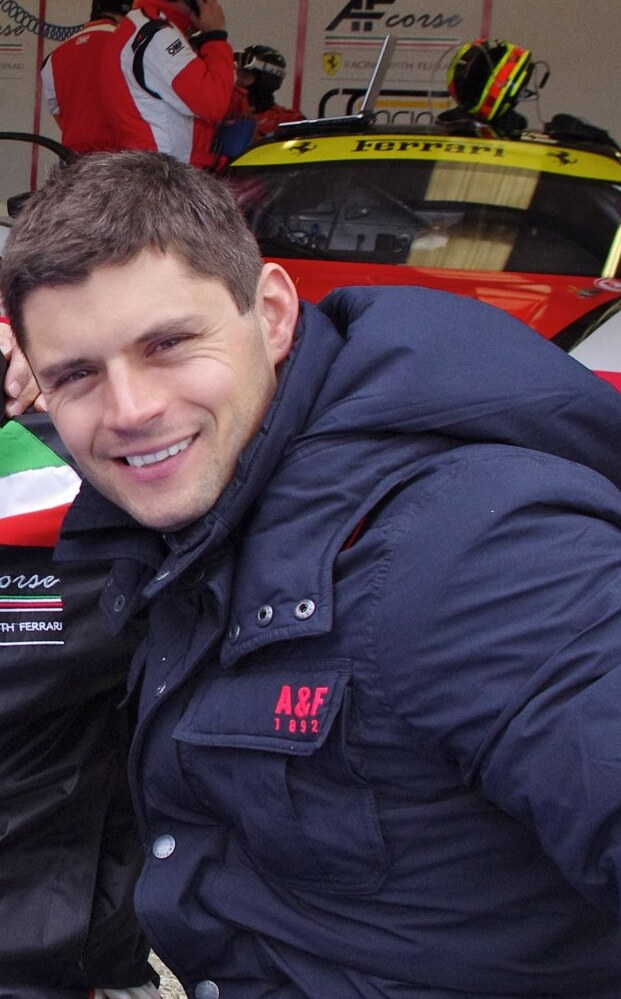
- Kaffer during the 2014 4 Hours of Silverstone
- Nationality: (Germany) German
- Born: 7 November 1976 (age 50) Bad Neuenahr-Ahrweiler, West Germany
- Categorisation: FIA Platinum (until 2014, 2016–2018); FIA Gold (2015, 2019–2026); FIA Silver (2027–)

24 Hours of Le Mans career
- Years: 2004, 2008–2017
- Teams: Audi Sport UK Team Veloqx, Farnbacher Racing, Risi Competizione, PeCom Racing
- Best finish: 5th (2004)
- Class wins: 1 (2009)

Pierre Kaffer (born 7 November 1976 in Bad Neuenahr-Ahrweiler, Rhineland-Palatinate) is a race car driver from Germany, currently living in Switzerland. Kaffer won the 2009 24 Hours of Le Mans in the GT2 class for Risi Competizione alongside Jaime Melo and Mika Salo.

== Career ==
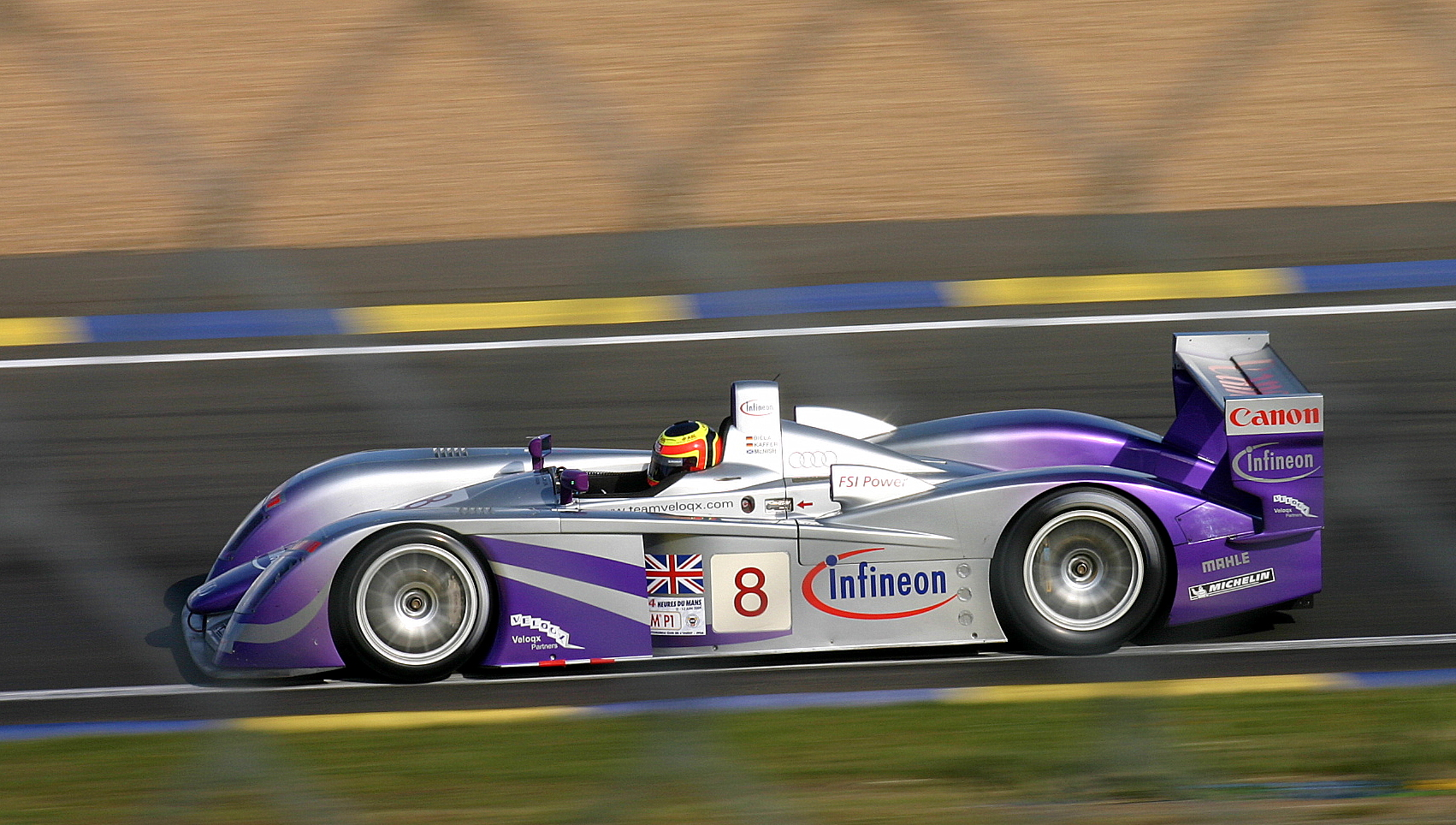
Kaffer won the 2004 12 Hours of Sebring on his LMP1 debut for Audi.

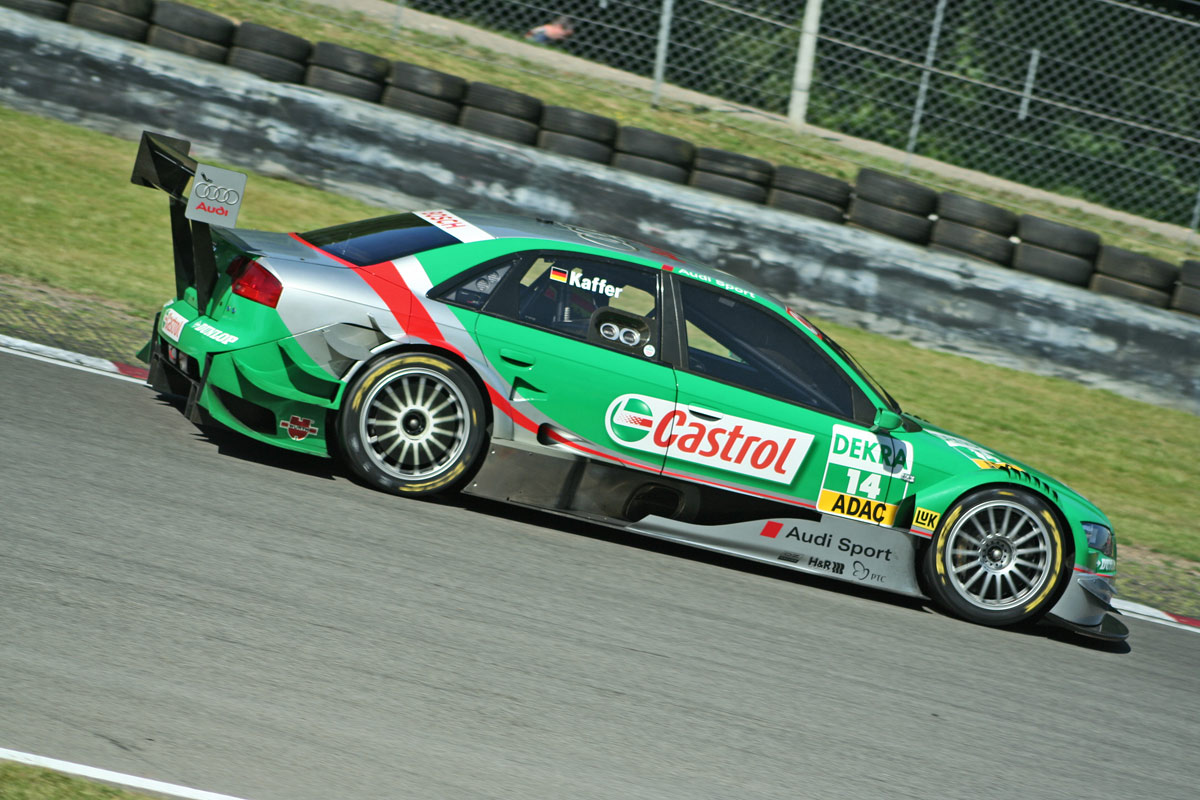
Kaffer driving for Audi (Team Phoenix) in the 2006 DTM season.

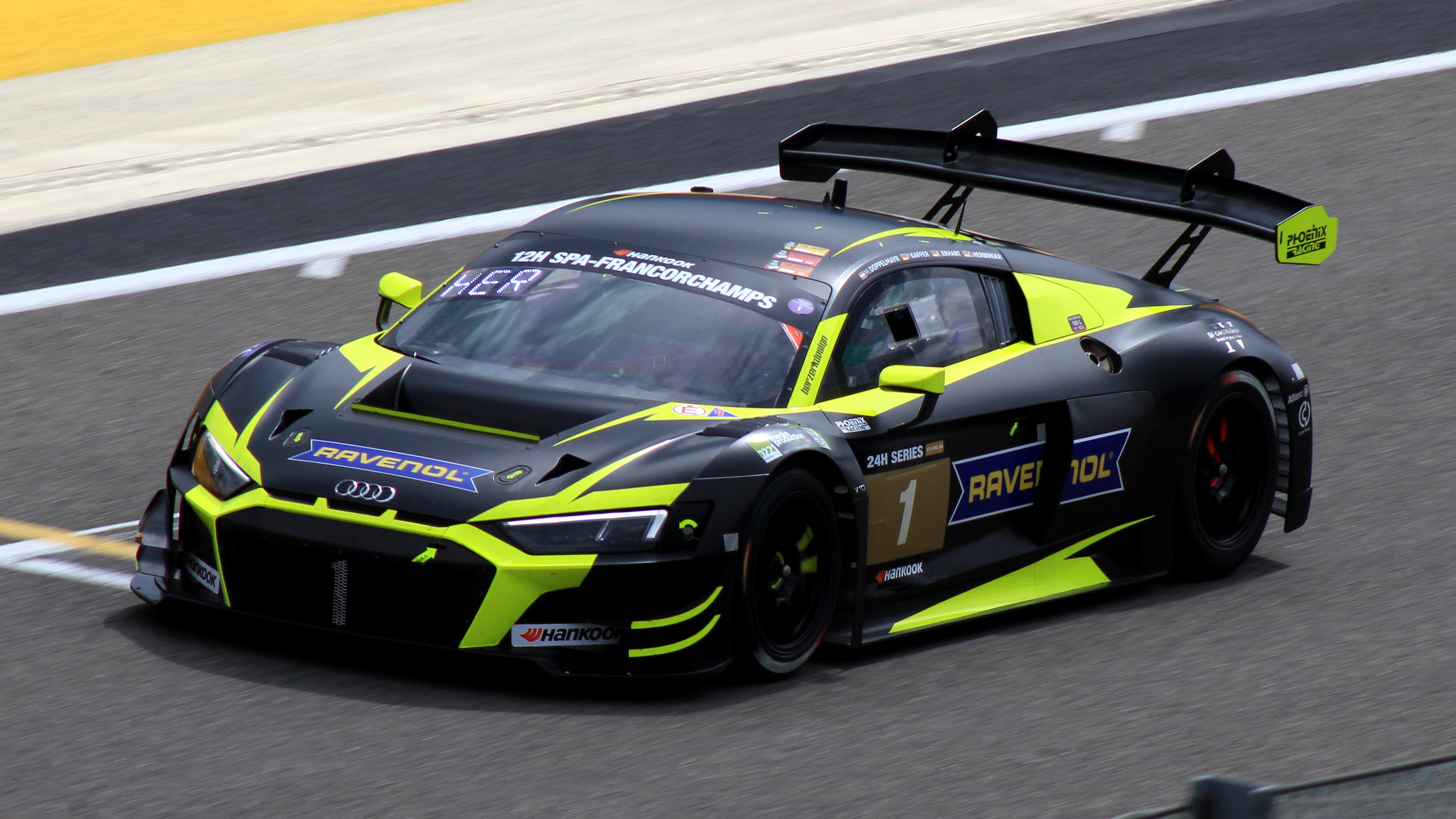
Kaffer driving for Audi (Scherer Sport PHX) in the 2023 24H Series season.

In 1990, Kaffer started in Karting, moving in 1994 to Formula Ford, later Formula Opel and then from 1997 to 2001 in the German Formula 3 Championship.

Kaffer's biggest success was in 2004, winning the 12 Hours of Sebring in an Audi R8.

For 2005 and 2006, Kaffer competed for Audi Sport Team Joest in the DTM series.

In 2009, Kaffer piloted a Ferrari F430GT for Risi Competizione in the American Le Mans Series.

For 2012, Kaffer competed in the FIA World Endurance Championship and European Le Mans Series in a Pecom Racing Oreca 03-Nissan.

== Racing record ==
=== 24 Hours of Le Mans results ===
Year	Team	Co-Drivers	Car	Class	Laps	Pos.	Class Pos.
2004	(United Kingdom) Audi Sport UK Team Veloqx	(United Kingdom) Allan McNish (Germany) Frank Biela	Audi R8	LMP1	350	5th	5th
2008	(Germany) Farnbacher Racing	(Germany) Pierre Ehret (Denmark) Lars-Erik Nielsen	Ferrari F430 GT2	GT2	317	23rd	**3rd**
2009	(United States) Risi Competizione	(Brazil) Jaime Melo (Finland) Mika Salo	Ferrari F430 GT2	GT2	329	18th	**1st**
2010	(United States) Risi Competizione	(Brazil) Jaime Melo (Italy) Gianmaria Bruni	Ferrari F430 GT2	GT2	116	DNF	DNF
2011	(Argentina) PeCom Racing	(Argentina) Luís Pérez Companc (Argentina) Matías Russo	Lola B11/40-Judd	LMP2	139	DNF	DNF
2012	(Argentina) PeCom Racing	(Argentina) Luís Pérez Companc (France) Soheil Ayari	Oreca 03-Nissan	LMP2	352	9th	**3rd**
2013	(Argentina) PeCom Racing	(Argentina) Luís Pérez Companc (France) Nicolas Minassian	Oreca 03-Nissan	LMP2	325	10th	4th
2014	(Italy) AF Corse	(Italy) Davide Rigon (Monaco) Olivier Beretta	Ferrari 458 Italia GTC	GTE; Pro	28	DNF	DNF
2015	(Austria) Team ByKolles	(Switzerland) Simon Trummer (Portugal) Tiago Monteiro	CLM P1/01-AER	LMP1	260	EX	EX
2016	(Austria) Team ByKolles	(Switzerland) Simon Trummer (United Kingdom) Oliver Webb	CLM P1/01-AER	LMP1	206	DNF	DNF
2017	(United States) Risi Competizione	(Finland) Toni Vilander (Italy) Giancarlo Fisichella	Ferrari 488 GTE	GTE; Pro	72	DNF	DNF

=== Complete Porsche Supercup results ===
(key) (Races in bold indicate pole position) (Races in italics indicate fastest lap)

Year	Team	Car	1	2	3	4	5	6	7	8	9	10	11	12	DC	Pts
2002	Team HP-Phoenix - PZK	Porsche 996 GT3	ITA	ESP	AUT	MON	GER; Ret	GBR	GER	HUN	BEL	ITA	USA	USA	NC‡	0‡
2003	Infineon Team Farnbacher PZM	Porsche 996 GT3	ITA; 1	**ESP**; 1	AUT; 2	MON; Ret	GER; 5	FRA; 4	GBR; 5	GER; 4	HUN; 2	ITA; 2	USA; Ret	USA; DSQ	**3rd**	**154**

‡ Not eligible for points for being a guest driver.

=== Complete European Le Mans Series results ===
(key) (Races in bold indicate pole position; races in italics indicate fastest lap)

Year	Entrant	Class	Car	Engine	1	2	3	4	5	Pos.	Pts
2004	Audi Sport UK Team Veloqx	LMP1	Audi R8	Audi 3.6L Turbo V8	MNZ; 2	NÜR; 1	SIL; 1	SPA; Ret		2nd	28
2008	Farnbacher Racing	GT2	Ferrari F430GT	Ferrari 4.0 L V8	CAT; 4	MNZ; 2	SPA; Ret	**NÜR**; 10	SIL; 3	4th	19
2009	Hankook Farnbacher Racing	GT2	Ferrari F430 GT2	Ferrari 4.0 L V8	CAT	SPA; Ret	ALG; 5	**NÜR**; 4	SIL; 5	7th	14
2010	CRS Racing	GT2	Ferrari F430 GT2	Ferrari 4.0 L V8	LEC; 4	SPA; 15	ALG; 11	HUN	SIL; 13	13th	30
2011	Pecom Racing	LMP2	Lola B11/40	Judd-BMW HK 3.6 L V8	LEC; 2	SPA; Ret	IMO; 4	SIL; Ret	EST; Ret	10th	22
2012	Pecom Racing	LMP2	Oreca 03	Nissan VK45DE 4.5 L V8	LEC; 7	DON; 5	PET			9th	16
2014	AT Racing	GTE	Ferrari F458 Italia	Ferrari 4.5 L V8	SIL; 4	IMO; 4	RBR; 4	LEC; 2	EST; 6	5th	62

=== Complete Deutsche Tourenwagen Masters results ===
(key) (Races in bold indicate pole position) (Races in italics indicate fastest lap)

Year	Team	Car	1	2	3	4	5	6	7	8	9	10	11	Pos.	Pts
2005	Audi Sport Team Joest	Audi A4 DTM 2004	HOC; 13†	LAU; 5	SPA; 14	BRN; 12	OSC; 17	NOR; 8	NÜR; 18	ZAN; 11	LAU; Ret	IST; Ret	HOC; 10	15th	5
2006	Audi Sport Team Phoenix	Audi A4 DTM 2005	HOC; Ret	LAU; 10	OSC; 10	BRH; 9	NOR; 8	NÜR; 14	ZAN; 9	CAT; Ret	BUG; 12	HOC; NC		16th	1
Sources:

- † — Retired, but was classified as he completed 90% of the winner's race distance.

=== Complete Porsche Carrera Cup Germany results ===
(key)

Year	Team	Car	1	2	3	4	5	6	7	8	9	DC	Pts
2007	Schnabl Engineering	Porsche 997 GT3	HOC; 12	OSC; 11	LAU; 1; 12	LAU; 2; 9	NOR; Ret	ZAN; 20	NÜR; 5	CAT; 9	HOC; 10	12th	48

=== Complete FIA World Endurance Championship results ===
(key) (Races in bold indicate pole position; races in italics indicate fastest lap)

Year	Entrant	Class	Car	Engine	1	2	3	4	5	6	7	8	9	Pos.	Pts
2012	PeCom Racing	LMP2	Oreca 03	Nissan VK45DE 4.5 V8	SEB; 3	SPA; 6	LMS; 2	SIL; 3	SÃO; 2	BHR; 1	FUJ; 4	SHA; 4		16th	34.5
2013	PeCom Racing	LMP2	Oreca 03	Nissan VK45DE 4.5 V8	SIL; 3	**SPA**; 1	LMS; 4	SÃO; 3	COA; 2	FUJ; 5	SHA; Ret	**BHR**; 7		4th	110
2014	Lotus	LMP1	CLM P1/01	AER P60 V6t	SIL	SPA	LMS	COA	FUJ; Ret	SHA; 14	BHR; Ret	SÃO; Ret		26th	0.5
2015	Team ByKolles	LMP1	CLM P1/01	AER P60 2.4 V6t	SIL	SPA	LMS; EX	NÜR; 15	COA; 8	FUJ; 8	SHA; 8	BHR; 12		15th	13
2016	ByKolles Racing Team	LMP1	CLM P1/01	AER P60 2.4 V6t	SIL	SPA	LMS; Ret	NÜR; Ret	MEX; 14	COA	FUJ; Ret	SHA; 7	BHR; 8	22nd	10.5

=== Complete IMSA SportsCar Championship results ===
(key) (Races in bold indicate pole position; results in italics indicate fastest lap)

Year	Team	Class	Make	Engine	1	2	3	4	5	6	7	8	9	10	11	12	Pos.	Points	Ref
2014	Starworks Motorsport	PC	Oreca FLM09	Chevrolet LS3 6.2 L V8	DAY; 6	SEB; 17											38th	26	
2014	Risi Competizione	GTLM	Ferrari 458 Italia GT2	Ferrari 4.5L V8			LBH	LGA; 3	WGL; 7	MOS; 10	IMS; 2	ROA; 1	VIR; 1	COA; 4	PET; 11		14th	233	
2015	Risi Competizione	GTLM	Ferrari 458 Italia GT2	Ferrari 4.5L V8	DAY; 9	SEB; 2	LBH; 2	LGA; 4	WGL; 5	MOS; 6	ROA; 3	VIR; 3	COA; 2	PET; 5			4th	293	
2016	Flying Lizard Motorsports	GTD	Audi R8 LMS ultra	Audi 5.2 V10	DAY; 19†	SEB; 15	LAG	DET	WGL	MOS	LIM	ROA	VIR	COA	PET		57th	18	
2017	Alex Job Racing	GTD	Audi R8 LMS	Audi 5.2L V10	DAY; 6	SEB	LBH	COT	DET	WGL	MOS	LIM	ELK	VIR	LGA	PET	60th	25	
2020	Team Hardpoint	GTD	Audi R8 LMS Evo	Audi 5.2 L V10	DAY	DAY	SEB	ELK	VIR	ATL	MDO	CLT	PET	LGA	SEB; 5		44th	26	

^{†} Kaffer did not complete sufficient laps in order to score full points.

=== Complete Blancpain GT Series Sprint Cup results ===
(key) (Races in bold indicate pole position; races in italics indicate fastest lap)

Year	Team	Car	Class	1	2	3	4	5	6	7	8	9	10	Pos.	Pts
2018	Attempto Racing	Audi R8 LMS	Pro	ZOL; 1 Ret	ZOL; 2; 14	BRH; 1; 6	BRH; 2; 12	MIS; 1 Ret	MIS; 2; 12	HUN; 1; 12	HUN; 2; 17	NÜR; 1; 8	NÜR; 2; 12	21st	6.5

=== Complete Le Mans Cup results ===
(key) (Races in bold indicate pole position; results in italics indicate fastest lap)

Year	Entrant	Class	Chassis	1	2	3	4	5	6	7	Rank	Points
2024	Racing Spirit of Léman	LMP3	Ligier JS P320	CAT	LEC	LMS; 1; 34	LMS; 2; 31	SPA	MUG	ALG	NC†	0†
2025	M Racing	LMP3 Pro-Am	Ligier JS P325	CAT; 10	LEC; 13	LMS; 1; 18	LMS; 2; 15	SPA; 10	SIL; 12	ALG	27th*	3*

^{†} As Kaffer was a guest driver, he was ineligible to score championship points.
^{*} Season still in progress.

Sporting positions
Preceded by Joël Camathias; Marcel Fässler	International GT Open champion 2010 with Álvaro Barba	Succeeded by Soheil Ayari
