= Porsche Supercup =

International one-make racing series

- The official logo of Porsche Mobil 1 Supercup
- Category: One-make production GT3 stock car racing by Porsche
- Country: International
- Inaugural season: 1993
- Drivers: 24
- Teams: 9
- Constructors: Porsche
- Engine suppliers: Porsche
- Tyre suppliers: Michelin
- Drivers' champion: (Netherlands) Flynt Schuring
- Teams' champion: (France) Schumacher CLRT
- Official website: porsche.com/international

The Porsche Supercup (officially known as Porsche Mobil 1 Supercup for sponsorship reasons, known as Porsche Michelin Supercup prior to 2007 and often abbreviated as PSC) is an international one-make production stock car racing series supporting the FIA Formula One World Championship organized by Porsche Motorsport GmbH.

Porsche Supercup drivers compete in identical Porsche 911 GT3 Cup cars. On average, 24 race cars take part in each race. Most circuits visited by the series are European, although circuits in Bahrain, United Arab Emirates, the United States and Mexico have been included in the calendar as well.

== Naming and history ==
The Porsche Supercup naming carrying the "-cup" suffix nomenclature since 1993 which is also used by NASCAR Cup Series since 1971.

Since 1993 the Porsche Michelin Supercup has run as support to the FIA Formula 1 World Championship. The number of races has grown from the original nine to total 13 in 2006, although decreasing to 11 in 2017 and eight in 2020. Prior to 1993, the series was known as the Porsche Carrera Cup.

== Regulations ==
Two sets of slick tyres may be used per car each weekend. The number of wet tyres is unlimited. The tyres are identical for all competitors and are not permitted to be pre-warmed or chemically treated.

In-race pit stops are not mandatory and no refueling is allowed during the race, but pit stops are allowed when necessary (e.g., in case of tyre puncture, body damage, changes in weather conditions, etc.).

=== Racing flags ===
These are the racing flags that usually used in every Porsche Mobil 1 Supercup race weekends:

Flag	Names	Meaning
	SC Board (Safety Car)	Shown in conjunction with a yellow flag to indicate that the Safety Car is on track. Full course yellow flag applies. Drivers must hold position and slow down.
	VSC Board (Virtual Safety Car)	Shown in conjunction with a yellow flag to indicate that the virtual safety car is in use. During this time, the drivers are given maximum sector times that they must stay below. Full course double yellow flag applies.
	Green	Normal racing conditions apply. This is usually shown following a yellow flag to indicate that the hazard has been passed. A green flag is shown at all stations for the lap following the end of a full-course yellow (or safety car). A green flag is also shown at the start of every race sessions (free practice, qualifying and race).
	Yellow	Indicates a hazard on or near the track (waved yellows indicate a hazard on the track, frozen yellows indicate a hazard near the track). Double waved yellows inform drivers that they must slow down as marshals are working on or near to the track and drivers should be prepared to stop.
	Yellow and red striped	Slippery track, due to oil, water or loose debris. Can be seen 'rocked' from side-to-side (not waved) to indicate a small animal on track.
	Blue	A blue flag indicates that the driver in front must let faster cars behind him pass because he is being lapped. If flag is missed 3 times the driver could be penalised.
	White	Indicates that there is a slow car ahead. Often waved at the end of the pit lane when a car is about to leave the pits.
	Black and orange circle	Car is damaged or has a mechanical problem, must return to the pit lane immediately. Will be accompanied by driver's number
	Half black half white	Warns a driver for poor sportsmanship or dangerous behaviour. Can be followed by a Black flag upon further infringement. Accompanied by the driver's number.
	Black	Driver is disqualified. Will be accompanied by the driver's number. This can be issued after a Half Black Half White flag.
	Red	A red flag immediately halts a race or session when conditions become too dangerous to continue.
	Chequered flag	End of the practice, qualifying or racing session.

== Racing cars ==
=== Chassis ===
Porsche Supercup cars adhere to a rear-engined rear-wheel-drive design. A roll cage serves as a carbon-fibre space frame chassis and is covered by a multiple-gauge sheet metal body. They have a closed cockpit, fenders, a rear wing, and an aerodynamic splitter. Each team may purchase cars and engines from other teams.

The car has a front MacPherson strut suspension, and a rear Multi-link suspension. Brake discs must be made of steel and may not exceed 380 mm (15 in) diameter. The only aerodynamic components on the vehicles are the front splitter, rear wing, solid polycarbonate glass window in the windows only, and side skirts. The use of rear diffusers, vortex generators, canards, wheel well vents, hood vents, and undertrays are prohibited.

Porsche Supercup cars are required to have at least 1 working windshield wiper installed on the car for all tracks as a part of the road racing rules package.

=== Evolution of Porsche Supercup cars ===
==== 911 Cup (Type 964) ====
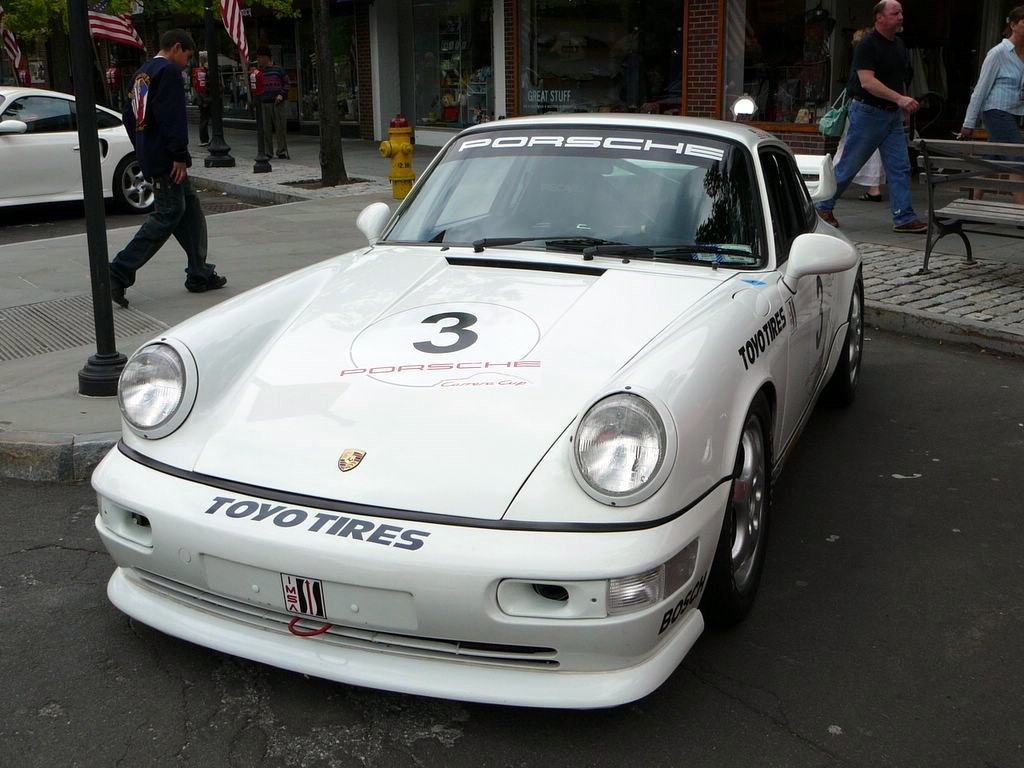
Porsche 911 Cup (964)

For the inaugural 1993 Porsche Supercup season the 964 Cup (used in Carrera Cup from 1992) based on the 964 Carrera RS (itself based on the earlier 1990 964 Carrera Cup) was the vehicle of choice. Compared to the road car the Cup race car features a similarly stripped-out interior and retains the catalytic converter, 18 inch magnesium wheels and ABS but was lowered by 20mm, featured a full roll cage and no passenger seat.

==== 911 Cup 3.8 (Type 993) ====
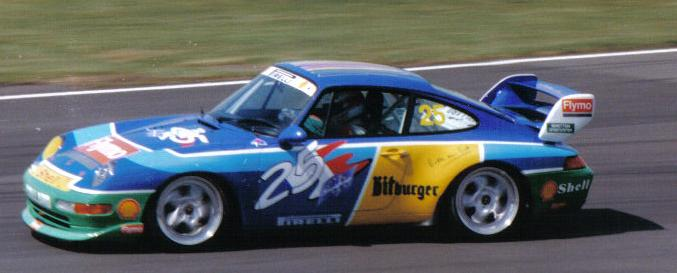
Porsche 911 Cup (993)

Based on the 993 Carrera 2 and used in the Porsche Supercup for seasons 1994–1997. Updated in 1995 with aero parts from the new Carrera RS, followed by a five-horsepower increase to 315 PS (232 kW; 311 hp) at 6,200 rpm in 1996. 216 units were produced in total.

==== 911 GT3 Cup (Type 996) ====
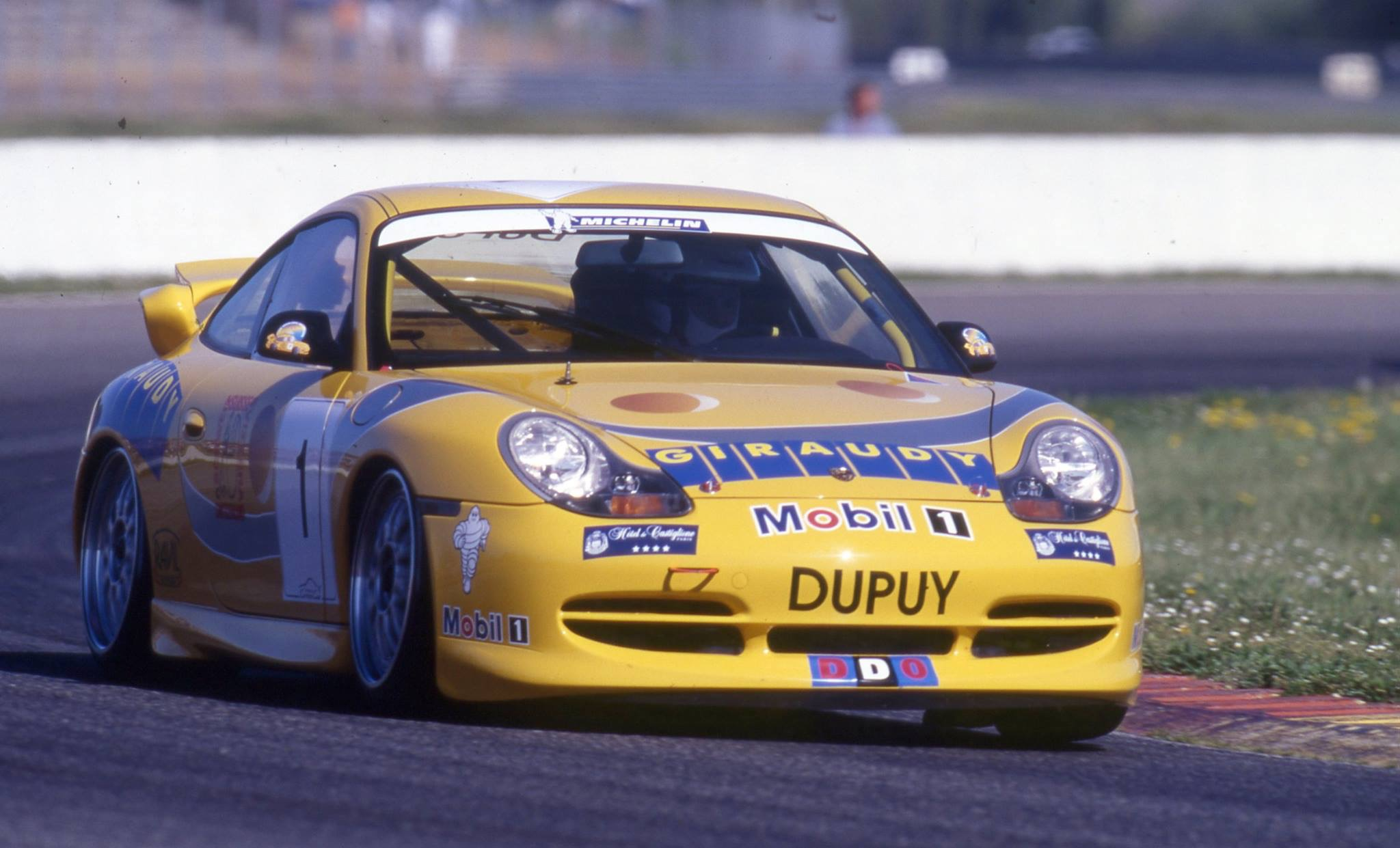
Porsche 911 GT3 Cup (996) front (Pictured racing in Carrera Cup France)

Raced in the Porsche Supercup seasons 1998–2001. Basis for the upcoming 996 GT3 road car, featuring a 3.6 litre boxer engine on basis of the GT1 block. For the 1999 season the engine output was increased to 272 kW (370 PS; 365 bhp) and 370 N⋅m (273 lbf⋅ft) at 6,250 rpm. The car managed the 0-100 km/h (62 mph) sprint in four seconds, with a top speed of 286 km/h (178 mph). For the 2001 season the GT3 Cup received modified aerodynamics including an enlarged rear wing and improved cooling.

==== 911 GT3 Cup (Type 996 II) ====
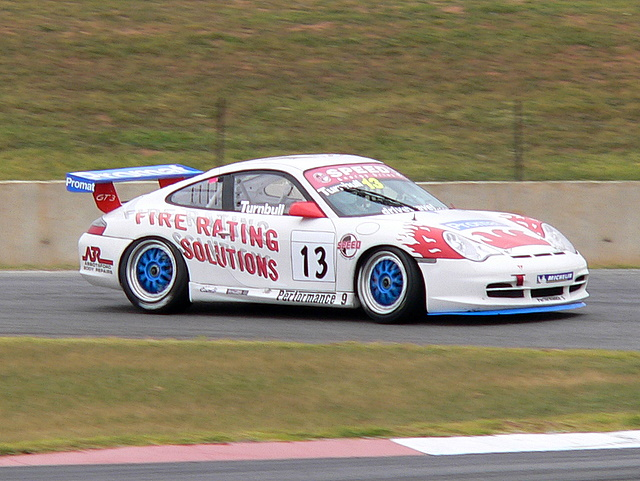
Porsche 911 GT3 Cup (996 II) front

Raced in the Porsche Supercup seasons 2002–2004. For 2002 the GT3 Cup received several changes based on the 996.2 Carrera and Turbo models, including Turbo-style headlights. The new body significantly improves aerodynamics and cooling. Engine output is increased to 280 kW (381 PS; 375 bhp) and 380 N⋅m (280 lbf⋅ft), further changes include improved transmission cooling, a lightened exhaust system and other light-weighing measures across the car. For the 2004 season the car received further upgrades. Engine output is once again increased slightly, to 287 kW (390 PS; 385 bhp) at 7,200 rpm and 390 N⋅m (288 lbf⋅ft) at 6,500 rpm. Gear ratios of fourth, fifth and sixth gears have been shortened. An 89-litre fuel tank improves endurance racing capabilities. In the interior changes are made to enable the use of the HANS device.

==== 911 GT3 Cup (Type 997) ====
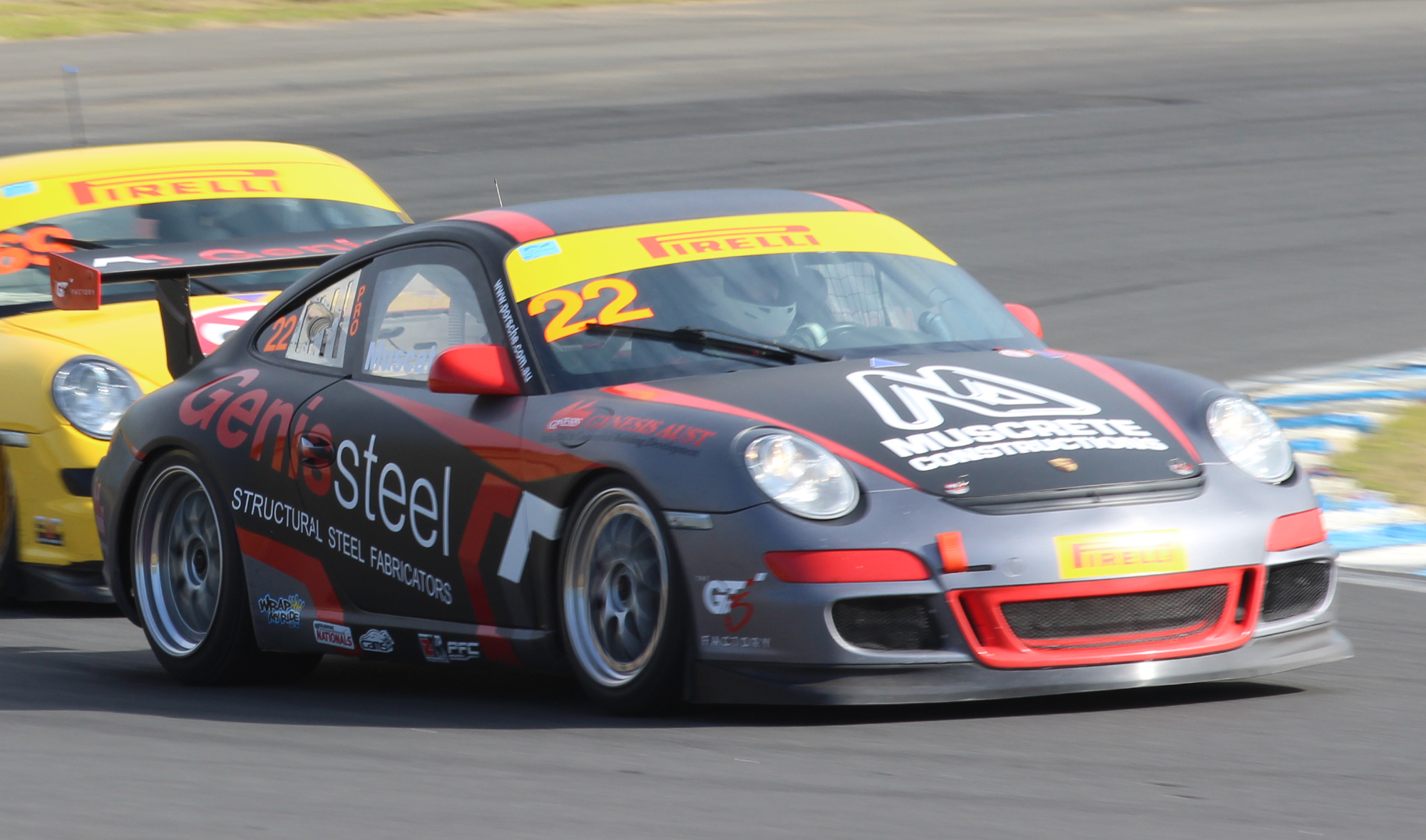
Porsche 911 GT3 Cup (997) front

Raced in the Porsche Supercup seasons 2005–2009. The 997-based Cup car features significantly improved aerodynamics and lightweight CFRP parts, including doors, rear body panels, engine deck lid and rear wing. Parts of the suspension are adopted from the GT3 RSR.

==== 911 GT3 Cup 3.8 (Type 997 II) ====
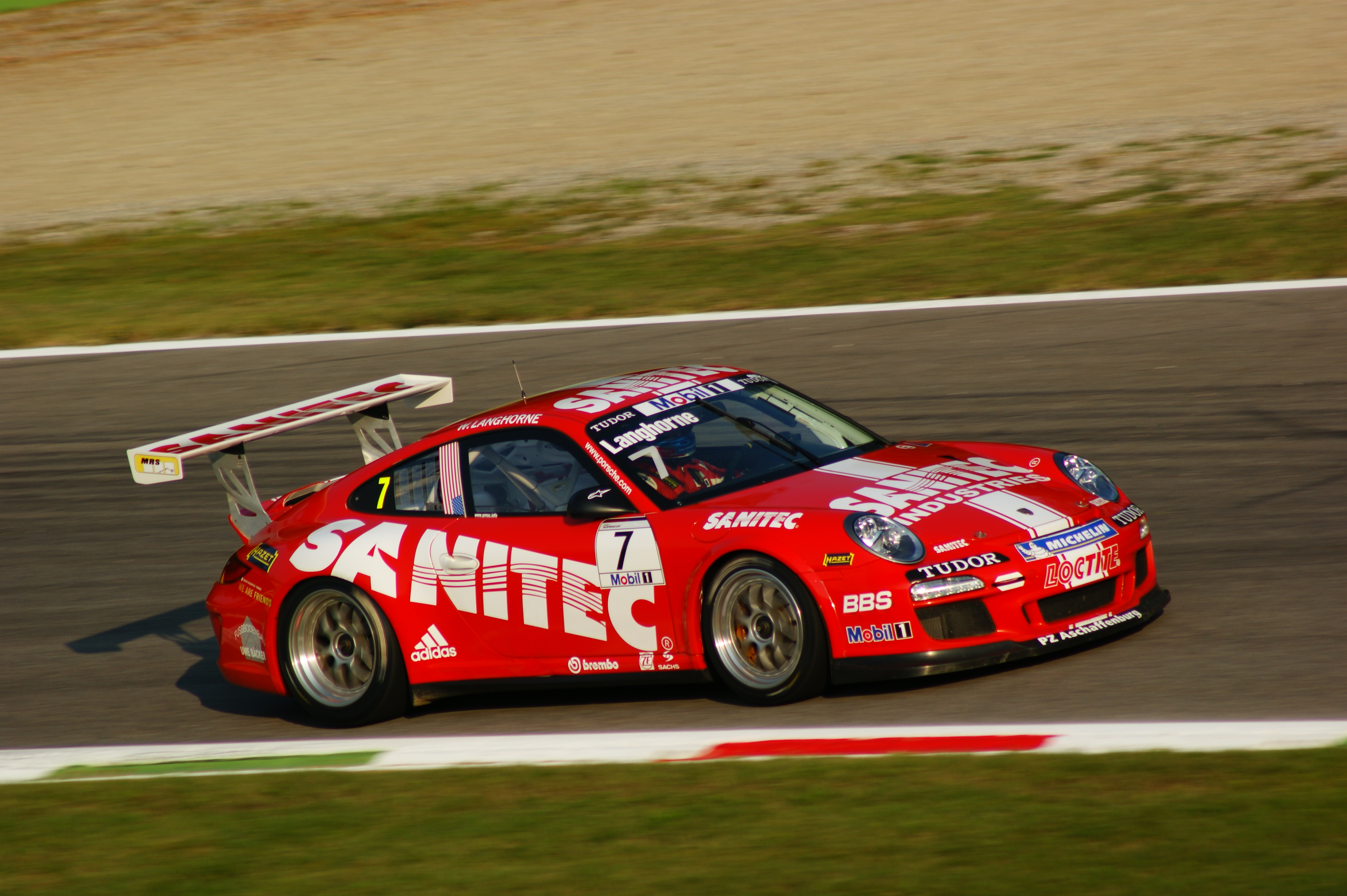
Porsche 911 GT3 Cup (997 II) front

Raced in the Porsche Supercup seasons 2010–2012. Based on 997.2 GT3 RS, the car features a new 3.8 litre engine, an enlarged rear wing adopted from 911 GT3 Cup S measuring 1.70 m (67 in), additional Unibal joints on the track control arms and front and rear sword-shaped anti-roll bars with seven position settings each and a steering wheel mounted Info Display with 6 switches. The vehicle was unveiled at the 2009 Frankfurt Motor Show and deliveries began in the same year. The base MSRP of the European model was €149,850 (before tax).

==== 911 GT3 Cup (Type 991) ====
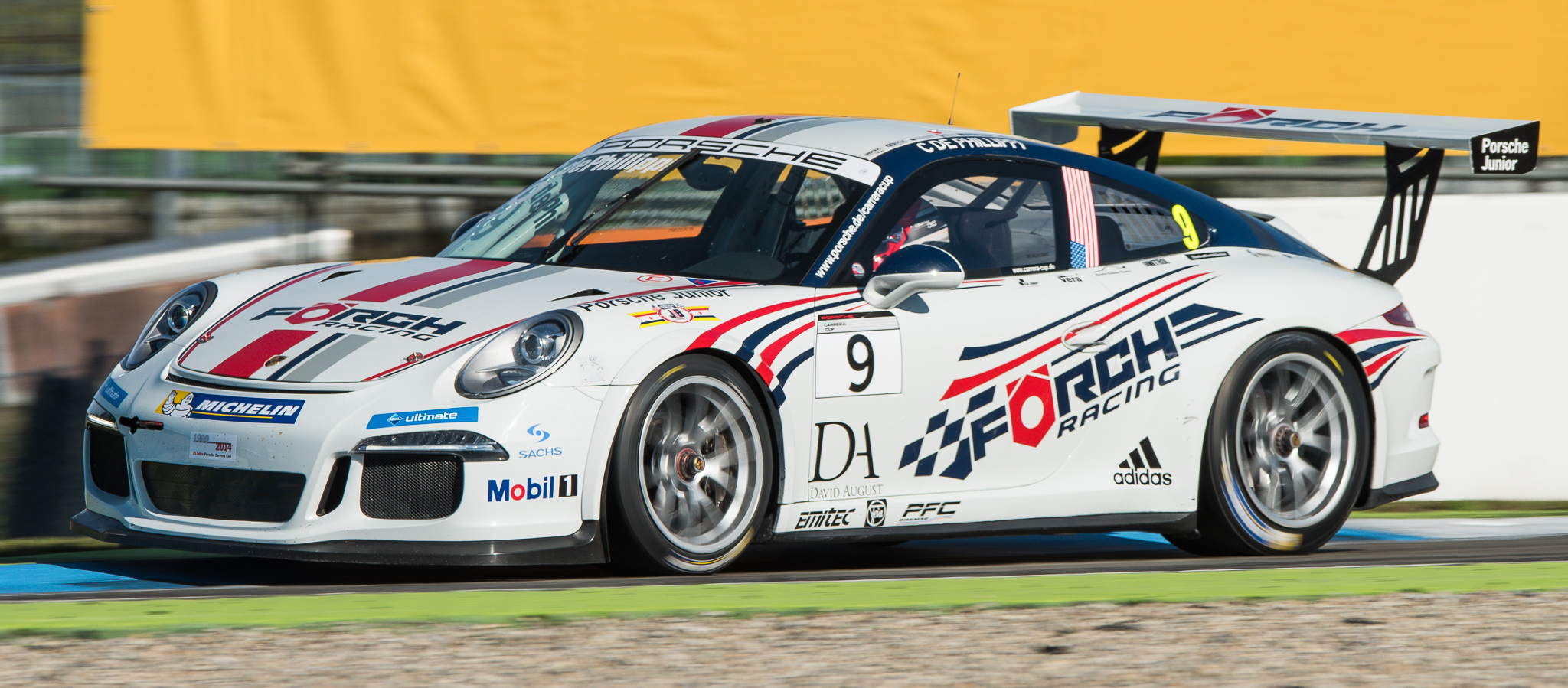
2014 Porsche 911 GT3 Cup (991) front

Based on the Porsche 911 GT3 type 991, this 911 GT3 Cup was used in the Porsche Supercup for the seasons 2013–2016. The Porsche 911 GT3 Cup Type 991 features the new gearbox paddle-shifters for the first time.

==== 911 GT3 Cup (Type 991 II) ====
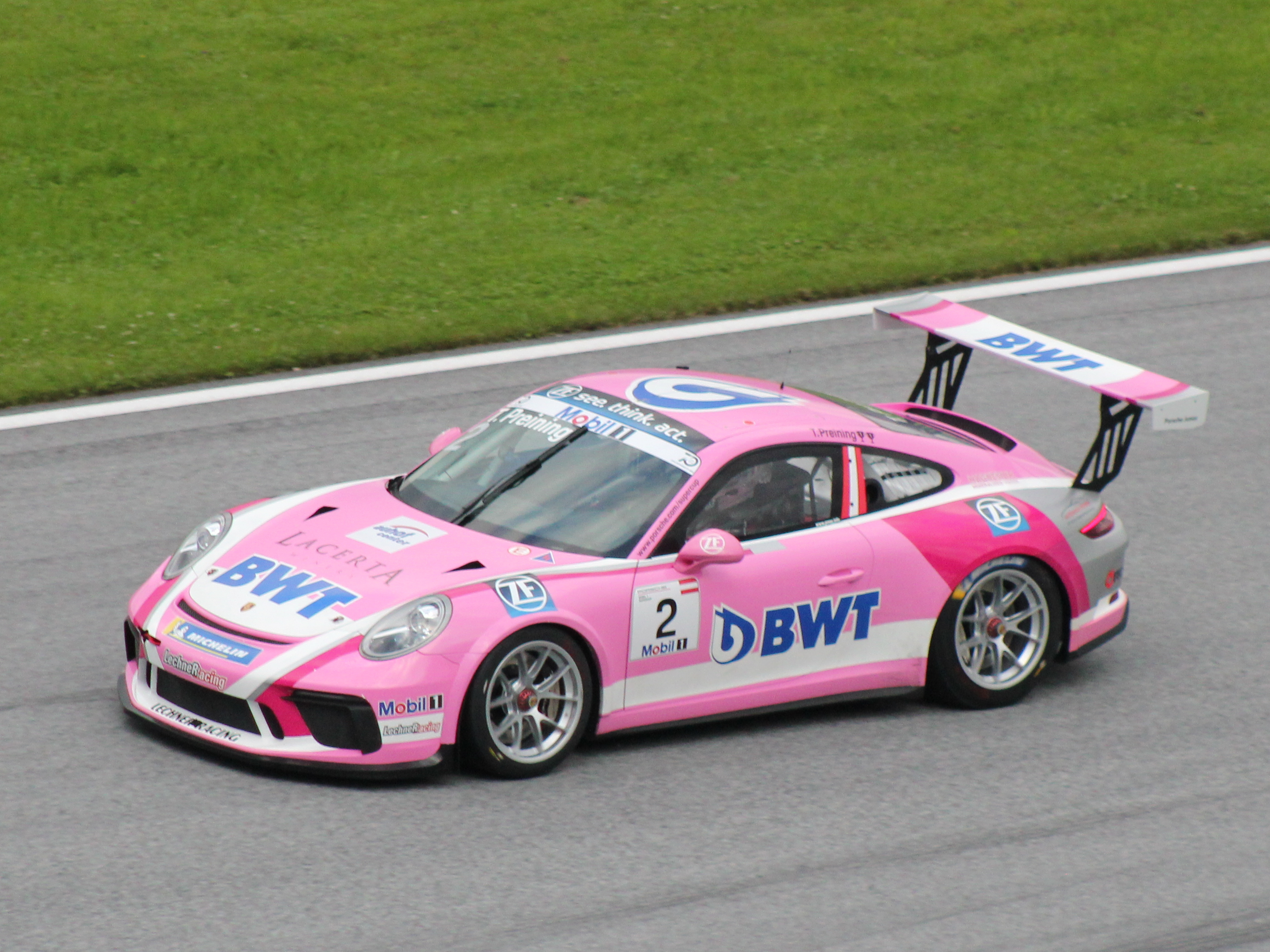
The Austrian Thomas Preining in the Porsche 911 GT3 Cup (991 II) used from 2017 to 2020

Raced in the Porsche Supercup from the 2017 season until the end of the 2020 season. Based on the latest 911 GT3 road car it features a larger 4.0-litre flat-six boxer engine, improved aerodynamics and an enlarged escape-hatch in the roof and is priced at €189,900 excluding taxes.

==== 911 GT3 Cup (Type 992) ====
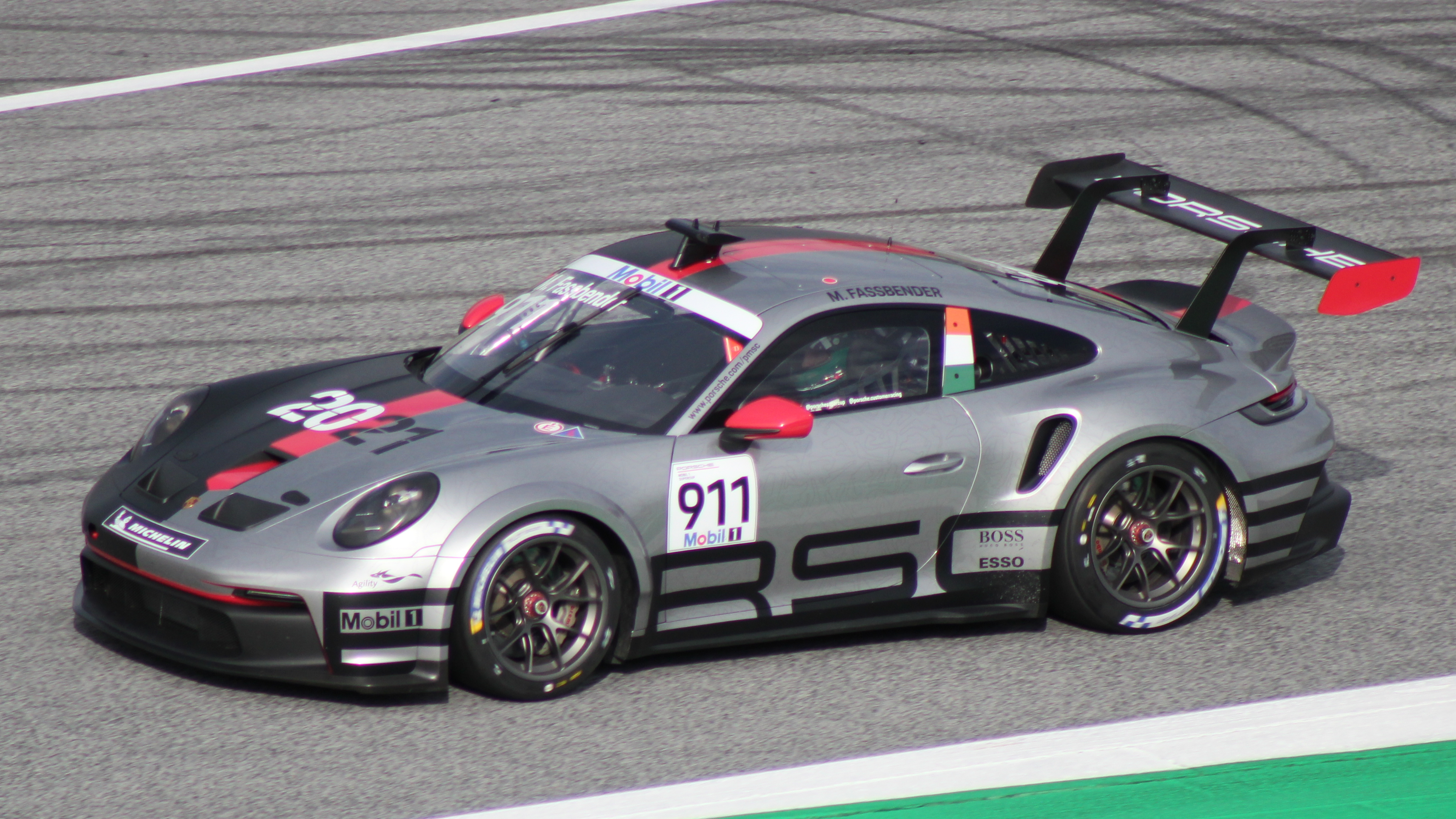
The Irish-German actor Michael Fassbender in the Porsche 911 GT3 Cup (992)

The standard Porsche 911 GT3 Cup (Type 992) raced in the Porsche Supercup starting for the first time in the 2021 season and is expected to race for the next few seasons. Based on the latest 911 GT3 road car, the 911 GT3 Cup Type 992 engines will remain the same as the 911 GT3 Cup (Type 991 II) but the power output will increase slightly from 485 to 510 bhp (362 to 380 kW; 492 to 517 PS).

==== 911 Cup (Type 992.2) ====
The standard Porsche 911 Cup (Type 992.2) will race in the Porsche Supercup starting for the first time in the 2026 season and is expected to race for the next few seasons. Based on the latest 911 GT3 road car, the 911 Cup Type 992.2 engines will remain the same as the 911 GT3 Cup (Type 992) but the power output will increase slightly from 510 to 520 bhp (380 to 388 kW; 517 to 527 PS). For the Type 992.2 Cup car Porsche has eliminated GT3 from the name to avoid confusion with FIA Group GT3.

=== Tyres ===
Pirelli was official first sole tyre partner and supplier for the series from 1993 until 2001 seasons. Later in 2002 Michelin became the second sole official tyre partner and supplier for the series since 2002 season until present.

=== Transmission, gearbox and clutches ===
For the transmission gearboxes, all Porsche Mobil 1 Supercup cars currently utilize a semi-automatic transmission with a 6-speed gearbox (including reverse gear) operated by paddle shifters and supplied by in-house Porsche since the 2013 season. From 1993 to 2012, all Porsche Mobil 1 Supercup cars used sequential manual transmission with a 6-speed gearbox operated by a conventional sequential shifter. The clutch of all Porsche Mobil 1 Supercup cars is a sintered metal-plate clutch operated by foot-pedal and provided by ZF Sachs. The mechanical limited-slip differential is also allowed and constant velocity joint tripod driveshafts are also used. All Porsche Mobil 1 Supercup cars drivetrain is currently rear-engine with rear-wheel-drive layout.

=== Cockpit and safety components ===
A typical of Porsche 911 GT3 Cup type 991 II cockpit.

For the safety equipment, all Porsche Mobil 1 Supercup cars seating utilizes racing bucket driver's seat with 6-point seat belts. The steering wheel of all Porsche Mobil 1 Supercup cars are made exclusively in-house by Porsche Motorsport GmbH. All Porsche Mobil 1 Supercup cars are also equipped with Cosworth Omega Intelligent Colour Display units since 2013 until 2020 season until it was replaced by all-new larger Cosworth CDU 10.3 display unit from 2021 season onwards. The fire extinguisher of all Porsche Mobil 1 Supercup cars are included in the bottom right-hand side underneath. The interior rear-view mirror is still currently used since 1993 until present.

The cockpit of all Porsche Mobil 1 Supercup cars are fully protected by doors, windshields and roofs (shielded by polycarbonate glass for windscreen, side windows and rear windows including also windshield wipers for rain weather only in the windscreen) because of current coupé-type car.

Since 2006, HANS device was introduced to all Porsche Supercup drivers to reduce risk of head and neck injuries.

=== Specifications ===
==== 1993 ====
- Engine displacement: 3,600 cc (220 cu in) naturally-aspirated flat-six
- Power output: 275 PS (202 kW; 271 hp) @6,100 rpm, 314 N⋅m (232 lbf⋅ft) @4,800 rpm
- Transmission: 5-speed manual transmission
- Weight: 1,120 kg (2,469 lb)
- Fuel: Shell unleaded

==== 1994–1997 ====
- Engine displacement: 3,746 cc (229 cu in) naturally-aspirated flat-six
- Power output: 310 PS (228 kW; 306 hp) at 6,100 rpm, 360 N⋅m (266 lbf⋅ft) at 5,500 rpm
- Transmission: 6-speed manual transmission
- Weight: 1,100 kg (2,425 lb)
- Fuel: Shell (1994–1995) later Panta (1996–1997) unleaded

==== 1998–2001 ====
- Engine displacement: 3,600 cc (220 cu in) naturally-aspirated flat-six
- Bore × stroke: 100 mm × 76.4 mm
- Power output: 265 kW (360 PS; 355 bhp) at 7,200 rpm, 360 N⋅m (266 lbf⋅ft) at 6,250 rpm
- Redline: 8,000 rpm
- Transmission: 6-speed manual transmission
- Tyres: Pirelli slick; "245/645-18" front, "305/645-18" rear
- Brakes: 330 mm brake disks front/rear, ABS standard
- Fuel tank capacity: 64 L (14 imp gal; 17 US gal)
- Weight: 1,140 kg (2,513 lb)
- Fuel: Panta unleaded

==== 2002–2004 ====
- Engine displacement: 3,600 cc (220 cu in) naturally-aspirated flat-six
- Bore × stroke: 100mm × 76.4mm
- Power output: 280 kW (381 PS; 375 bhp) at 7,200 rpm, 380 N⋅m (280 lbf⋅ft) at 6,250 rpm
- Transmission: 6-speed manual transmission
- Tyres: Michelin slick; "24/64-18" front, "27/68-18" rear
- Brakes: 350 mm brake disks front/330 mm rear, ABS standard
- Fuel tank capacity: 64 L (14 imp gal; 17 US gal)
- Weight: 1,140 kg (2,513 lb)
- Fuel: Panta unleaded

==== 2005–2009 ====
- Engine displacement: 3,598 cc (220 cu in) naturally-aspirated flat-six
- Power output: 294 kW (400 PS; 394 bhp) at 7,000 rpm, 400 N⋅m (295 lbf⋅ft) at 6,500 rpm
- Bore × stroke: 100 mm × 76.4 mm
- Redline: 8,200 rpm
- Transmission: 6-speed sequential manual transmission
- Tyres: Michelin slick; "24/64-18" front, "27/68-18" rear
- Brakes: 380 mm front/350 mm rear brake disks
- Wheelbase: 2,355 mm (93 in)
- Track (front/rear): 1,515 mm (60 in)/1,780 mm (70 in)
- Weight: 1,120 kg (2,469 lb)
- Fuel: Panta unleaded

==== 2010–2012 ====
- Engine displacement: 3,797 cc (232 cu in) naturally-aspirated flat-six
- Power output: 331 kW (450 PS; 444 bhp) at 7,500 rpm
- Redline: 8,500 rpm
- Transmission: 6-speed sequential manual transmission
- Wheels & tyres: Michelin slick; "24/64-18" on 9.5Jx18 front, "27/68-18" on 12Jx18 rear
- Brakes: 380 mm front/350 mm rear brake disks
- Weight: 1,160 kg (2,557 lb)
- Fuel: Panta High Performance unleaded
- Steering: Power steering with electro-hydraulic pressure feed, rack and pinion

==== 2013–2016 ====
- Chassis: Lightweight body featuring intelligent aluminum-steel composite design
- Engine: Porsche Motorsport MA1.75/MDG.GA
- Displacement: 3,800 cc (232 cu in) naturally-aspirated flat-six box
- Bore × stroke: 102.7 mm × 76.4 mm
- Power output: 338 kW (460 PS; 453 bhp) at 7,500 rpm
- Redline: 8,500 rpm
- Fuel: Panta NS 102 RON unleaded
- Transmission: 6-speed paddle-shift sequential semi-automatic transmission dog-type gearbox with reverse
- Wheels & tyres: Michelin Porsche Cup N2 dry slick and treaded rain; "24/64-R18" on 9Jx18 ET28 front, "27/68-R18" on 11Jx18 ET53 rear
- Brakes: 380 mm front/rear brake disks, no ABS (can be retrofitted)
- Fuel tank capacity: 100 litres (22 imperial gallons; 26 US gallons) FIA FT3
- Length: 4,547 mm (179 in)
- Width: 1,851 mm (73 in)
- Height: 1,280 mm (50 in)
- Wheelbase: 2,458 mm (97 in)
- Weight: 1,200 kg (2,646 lb)
- Steering: Electro-hydraulic power steering with external control function, rack and pinion
- Safety equipment: Schroth 6-point seat-belt + HANS device + racing bucket seat with fore/aft adjustment + windshield wipers

==== 2017–2020 ====
- Chassis: Lightweight body featuring intelligent aluminum-steel composite design
- Engine: Porsche Motorsport MA1.76/MDG.G
- Displacement: 3,996 cc (244 cu in) flat-six boxer 4-stroke cycle
- Bore × stroke: 102 mm × 81.5 mm (4.02 in × 3.21 in)
- Power output: 357 kW (485 PS; 479 bhp) @ 7,500 rpm
- Torque: 480 N⋅m (354 lbf⋅ft) @ 6,250 rpm
- Redline: 9,000 rpm
- Compression ratio: 13.2:1
- Fuel: Panta NS 102 RON unleaded
- Lubricants: Mobil 1 ESP X3 0W-40 fully-synthetic motor oil
- Fuel delivery: Gasoline direct injection
- Fuel injection type: Bosch HDEV 6
- ECU provider: Bosch MS 6.6
- Transmission: In-house Porsche G91/70 6-speed paddle-shift sequential semi-automatic transmission dog-type gearbox with reverse
- Wheels & tyres: Michelin Porsche Cup N2 dry slick and treaded rain; 27/65-R18 on 10.5J × 18 App-Tech ET28 front, 31/71-R18 on 12J x 18 App-Tech ET53 rear
- Brakes: 380 mm front/rear brake disks, no ABS (can be retrofitted)
- Fuel tank capacity: 100 litres (26 US gallons) FIA FT3
- Aspiration: Naturally-aspirated
- Length: 4,564 mm (179.69 in)
- Width: 1,980 mm (78 in) incl. mirrors
- Height: 1,246 mm (49 in)
- Wheelbase: 2,456 mm (97 in)
- Weight: 1,200 kg (2,646 lb) including driver and fuel
- Steering: Electro-hydraulic power steering with external control function, rack and pinion
- Engine management: Cosworth IPS32 Mk. II
- Safety equipment: Schroth 6-point seat-belt + HANS device + racing bucket seat with fore/aft adjustment + windshield wipers

==== 2021–2025 ====
- Chassis: Lightweight body featuring intelligent aluminum-steel composite design
- Engine: Porsche Motorsport MA2.75
- Displacement: 3,996 cc (244 cu in) flat-six boxer 4-stroke cycle
- Bore × stroke: 102 mm × 81.5 mm (4.02 in × 3.21 in)
- Power output: 375 kW (510 PS; 503 bhp) @ 8,400 rpm
- Torque: 470 N⋅m (347 lbf⋅ft) @ 6,150 rpm
- Redline: 9,000 rpm
- Compression ratio: 13.3:1
- Fuel: Esso Synergy™ Renewable Racing Fuel 100% E100 Ethanol blend (2021-2023) later upgraded to Esso Synergy™ Renewable Racing (2024) later HIF Haru Oni e-Fuel (2025)
- Lubricants: Mobil 1 ESP X3 0W-40 fully-synthetic motor oil
- Fuel delivery: DFI gasoline direct injection
- Fuel injection type: Bosch HDEV 6
- ECU provider: Bosch MS 6.6
- Transmission: In-house Porsche 6-speed paddle-shift sequential semi-automatic transmission dog-type gearbox with reverse
- Wheels & tyres: Michelin Pilot Sport Porsche Cup N3 dry slick and treaded rain; 30/65-R18 on 12J × 18 App-Tech ET28 front, 31/71-R18 on 13J × 18 App-Tech ET53 rear
- Brakes: 380 mm front/rear brake disks, no ABS (can be retrofitted)
- Fuel tank capacity: 110 litres (29 US gallons) FIA FT3
- Aspiration: Naturally-aspirated
- Length: 4,585 mm (180.51 in)
- Width: 1,920 mm (76 in) on front axle; 1,902 mm (75 in) on rear axle
- Height: 1,246 mm (49 in)
- Wheelbase: 2,459 mm (97 in)
- Weight: 1,260 kg (2,778 lb) including driver and fuel
- Steering: Electro-hydraulic power steering with external control function, rack and pinion
- Safety equipment: Schroth 6-point seat-belt + HANS device + racing bucket seat with fore/aft adjustment + windshield wipers

==== 2026–present ====
- Chassis: Lightweight body featuring intelligent aluminum-steel composite design
- Engine: Porsche Motorsport MA2.75
- Displacement: 3,996 cc (244 cu in) flat-six boxer 4-stroke cycle
- Bore × stroke: 102 mm × 81.5 mm (4.02 in × 3.21 in)
- Power output: 382 kW (519 PS; 512 bhp) @ 8,400 rpm
- Torque: 470 N⋅m (347 lb⋅ft) @ 6,150 rpm
- Redline: 8,750 rpm
- Compression ratio: 13.3:1
- Fuel: HIF Haru Oni e-Fuel
- Lubricants: Mobil 1 ESP X3 0W-40 fully-synthetic motor oil
- Fuel delivery: DFI gasoline direct injection
- Fuel injection type: Bosch HDEV 6
- ECU provider: Bosch MS 6.6
- Transmission: In-house Porsche 6-speed paddle-shift sequential semi-automatic transmission dog-type gearbox with reverse
- Wheels & tyres: Michelin Pilot Sport Porsche Cup N3 dry slick and treaded rain with quality improvement; 30/65-R18 on 12J × 18 App-Tech ET28 front, 31/71-R18 on 13J × 18 App-Tech ET53 rear
- Brakes: 380 mm front/rear brake disks, now with ABS (can be retrofitted)
- Fuel tank capacity: 110 litres (29 US gallons) FIA FT3
- Aspiration: Naturally-aspirated
- Length: 4,599 mm (181.06 in)
- Width: 1,920 mm (76 in) on front axle; 1,902 mm (75 in) on rear axle
- Height: 1,246 mm (49 in)
- Wheelbase: 2,468 mm (97 in)
- Weight: 1,288 kg (2,840 lb) including driver and fuel
- Steering: Electro-hydraulic power steering with external control function, rack and pinion
- Safety equipment: Schroth 6-point seat-belt + HANS device + racing bucket seat with fore/aft adjustment + windshield wipers

== Championships ==
=== Driver championship ===
Points are assigned to the first 15 finishers of each race and all races count towards the championship. To receive points, a driver must compete in multiple races per season. Since 2008, there have been two bonus points awarded for the driver who secures pole position in qualifying.

Position	1st	2nd	3rd	4th	5th	6th	7th	8th	9th	10th	11th	12th	13th	14th	15th	Pole
Points	25	20	17	14	12	10	9	8	7	6	5	4	3	2	1	2

In the case of a tie, Porsche Supercup will determine the champion based on the most first-place finishes. If there is still a tie, Porsche Supercup will determine the champion by the most second-place finishes, then the most third-place finishes, etc., until a champion is determined. Porsche Supercup will apply the same system to other ties in the rankings at the close of the season and at any other time during the season.

=== Team championship ===
The points of the two best drivers of each team are added up. At the end of the season Porsche rewards the three best placed teams with prize money.

=== Prize money ===
In 2006 and 2007, Porsche AG pays around 820,000 euros to drivers and teams. Per race the winner receives 9,000 euros, the runner-up 7,500 euros and the third placed driver 6,500 euros. For a 15th place 1,400 euros are paid. Additionally, the 2006 or 2007 champion receives a Porsche road car. The driver with the fastest laps will be given a premium watch from Porsche Design.

In 2015, Porsche says it pays "more than 730,000 Euros in prize money to drivers and teams. In addition, the overall winner receives a special prize. The winner of the rookie classification receives an additional prize of 30,000 Euros providing he/she reregisters for the following year’s Porsche Mobil 1 Supercup."

== Champions ==
Dutch driver Patrick Huisman is the most successful driver in the championship, having won four straight titles between 1997 and 2000. Huisman's record is followed by Larry ten Voorde, René Rast and Michael Ammermüller with three titles, then Jeroen Bleekemolen and Richard Westbrook with two titles each. The reigning champion is Dutch driver Flynt Schuring.

As of 2026, Lechner Racing remains the most-successful team with 12 team championship titles to date.

Season	Champion	Team Champion	Car Model
1993	(Germany) Altfrid Heger	(Germany) Porsche Zentrum Koblenz	Porsche 911 (964) Cup
1994	(Germany) Uwe Alzen	(Germany) Porsche Zentrum Koblenz	Porsche 911 (993) GT3 Cup 3.8
1995	(France) Jean-Pierre Malcher	(France) JMB Competition	Porsche 911 (993) GT3 Cup 3.8
1996	(France) Emmanuel Collard	(Germany) Oberbayern Motorsport	Porsche 911 (993) GT3 Cup 3.8
1997	(Netherlands) Patrick Huisman	(Germany) Olaf Manthey Racing	Porsche 911 (993) GT3 Cup 3.8
1998	(Netherlands) Patrick Huisman (2x)	(Germany) Olaf Manthey Racing	Porsche 911 (996 I) GT3 Cup (1998–2001)
1999	(Netherlands) Patrick Huisman (3x)	(Germany) Olaf Manthey Racing	Porsche 911 (996 I) GT3 Cup (1998–2001)
2000	(Netherlands) Patrick Huisman (4x)	(Germany) Olaf Manthey Racing	Porsche 911 (996 I) GT3 Cup (1998–2001)
2001	(Germany) Jörg Bergmeister	(Germany) Farnbacher Racing	Porsche 911 (996 I) GT3 Cup (1998–2001)
2002	(Monaco) Stéphane Ortelli	(Germany) Kadach Tuning	Porsche 911 (996 II) GT3 Cup
2003	(Germany) Frank Stippler	(Germany) Farnbacher Racing	Porsche 911 (996 II) GT3 Cup
2004	(Germany) Wolf Henzler	(Germany) Farnbacher Racing	Porsche 911 (996 II) GT3 Cup
2005	(Italy) Alessandro Zampedri	(Austria) Walter Lechner Racing	Porsche 911 (997 I) GT3 Cup
2006	(United Kingdom) Richard Westbrook	(Germany) Jetstream Motorsport	Porsche 911 (997 I) GT3 Cup
2007	(United Kingdom) Richard Westbrook (2x)	(Germany) HISAQ Competition	Porsche 911 (997 I) GT3 Cup
2008	(Netherlands) Jeroen Bleekemolen	(Netherlands) Jetstream Motorsport	Porsche 911 (997 I) GT3 Cup
2009	(Netherlands) Jeroen Bleekemolen (2x)	(Austria) Konrad Motorsport	Porsche 911 (997 I) GT3 Cup
2010	(Germany) René Rast	(Austria) Al Faisal Lechner Racing	Porsche 911 (997 II) GT3 Cup
2011	(Germany) René Rast (2x)	(Austria) Veltins Lechner Racing	Porsche 911 (997 II) GT3 Cup
2012	(Germany) René Rast (3x)	(Austria) Lechner Racing	Porsche 911 (997 II) GT3 Cup
2013	(Denmark) Nicki Thiim	(Germany) Attempto Racing	Porsche 911 (991 I) GT3 Cup
2014	(New Zealand) Earl Bamber	(Austria) VERVA Lechner Racing Team	Porsche 911 (991 I) GT3 Cup
2015	(Austria) Philipp Eng	(Austria) Lechner Racing Middle East	Porsche 911 (991 I) GT3 Cup
2016	(Germany) Sven Müller	(Austria) Lechner MSG Racing Team	Porsche 911 (991 I) GT3 Cup
2017	(Germany) Michael Ammermüller	(Austria) Lechner MSG Racing Team	Porsche 911 (991 II) GT3 Cup
2018	(Germany) Michael Ammermüller (2x)	(Austria) BWT Lechner Racing	Porsche 911 (991 II) GT3 Cup
2019	(Germany) Michael Ammermüller (3x)	(Austria) BWT Lechner Racing	Porsche 911 (991 II) GT3 Cup
2020	(Netherlands) Larry ten Voorde	(Netherlands) Team GP Elite	Porsche 911 (991 II) GT3 Cup
2021	(Netherlands) Larry ten Voorde (2x)	(Netherlands) Team GP Elite	Porsche 911 (992) GT3 Cup
2022	(Luxembourg) Dylan Pereira	(Austria) BWT Lechner Racing	Porsche 911 (992) GT3 Cup
2023	(Denmark) Bastian Buus	(Austria) BWT Lechner Racing	Porsche 911 (992) GT3 Cup
2024	(Netherlands) Larry ten Voorde (3x)	(France) Schumacher CLRT	Porsche 911 (992) GT3 Cup
2025	(France) Alessandro Ghiretti	(France) Schumacher CLRT	Porsche 911 (992) GT3 Cup
2026	(Netherlands) Flynt Schuring	(France) Schumacher CLRT	Porsche 911 (992.2) GT3 Cup

== Circuits ==
- (Australia) Albert Park Circuit (1999)
- (Portugal) Algarve International Circuit (2027)
- (Mexico) Autódromo Hermanos Rodríguez (2017–2019)
- Bahrain International Circuit (2006–2010, 2012)
- (Spain) Circuit de Barcelona-Catalunya (1993–1995, 1999–2011, 2013–2020, 2025–2026)
- Circuit de Monaco (1993–2019, 2021–present)
- (France) Circuit de Nevers Magny-Cours (1993–1997, 2000, 2003–2008)
- (Belgium) Circuit de Spa-Francorchamps (1993–1999, 2001–2002, 2004–2005, 2007–present)
- (United States) Circuit of the Americas (2014–2016)
- (Netherlands) Circuit Zandvoort (2021–2026)
- (France) Circuit Paul Ricard (2022)
- (Portugal) Circuito do Estoril (1994, 1996)
- (Germany) Hockenheimring (1993–2006, 2008, 2010, 2012, 2014, 2016, 2018–2019)
- (Hungary) Hungaroring (1993–2021, 2023–present)
- (Italy) Imola Circuit (1993–2006, 2022, 2024–2025)
- (United States) Indianapolis Motor Speedway (2000–2006)
- (Turkey) Istanbul Park (2007–2009, 2011, 2027)
- (Spain) Madring (2027)
- (Italy) Monza Circuit (1998, 2001–present)
- (Germany) Norisring (1993)
- (Germany) Nürburgring (1995–2007, 2009, 2011, 2013)
- (Germany) Nürburgring Nordschleife (2011)
- (Austria) Red Bull Ring (1997–2003, 2014–present)
- (United Kingdom) Silverstone Circuit (1994–2020, 2022–2024)
- (Spain) Valencia Street Circuit (2008–2010, 2012)
- (United Arab Emirates) Yas Marina Circuit (2009, 2011, 2013)

== Popularity ==
At the Grand Prix circuits during 2006 an average of 125,000 spectators witnessed the action from the grandstands at each round. According to Porsche AG races attracted 22 million TV viewers worldwide, most of them in Europe where Eurosport provided regular coverage.

== Porsche Carrera Cup ==
Porsche also runs many regional and national one-make production racing series around the globe.

- Porsche Carrera Cup Asia
- Porsche Carrera Cup Australia
- Porsche Carrera Cup Benelux
- Porsche Carrera Cup Brasil
- Porsche Carrera Cup France
- Porsche Carrera Cup Germany
- Porsche Carrera Cup Great Britain
- Porsche Carrera Cup Italy
- Porsche Carrera Cup Japan
- Porsche Carrera Cup North America
- Porsche Carrera Cup Scandinavia
- Porsche Carrera Cup Middle East

== See also ==
- Audi R8 LMS Cup
- Ferrari Challenge
- Lamborghini Super Trofeo
- Audi Sport TT Cup
