= István Rácz =

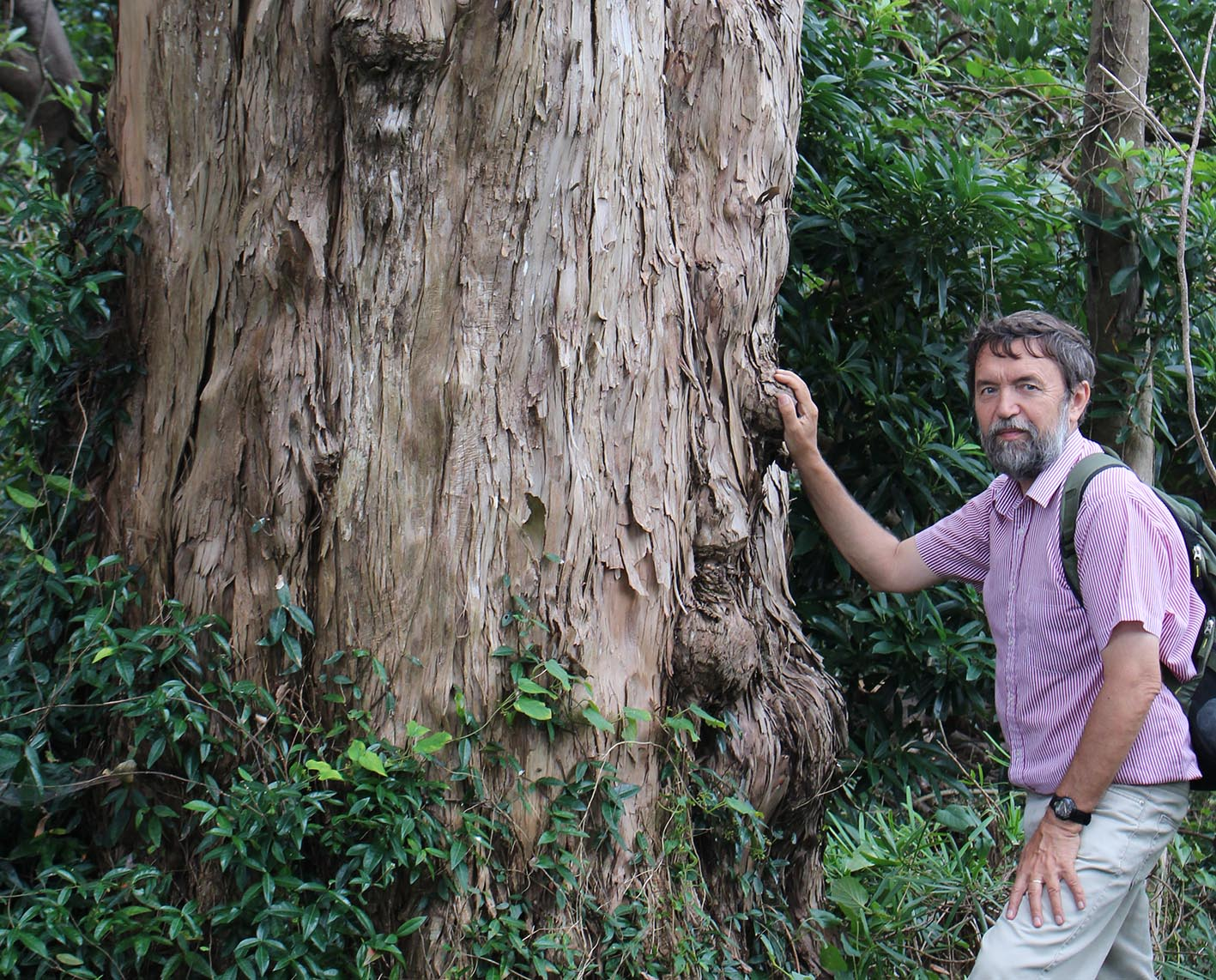
- Born: 1952 (age 73–74)
- Occupations: Dendrologist, curator, museologist

Rácz István (born 1952) is a Hungarian dendrologist, curator, and museologist.

== Research fields ==
Woody plant (primarily conifer) taxonomy, ecology, conservation, and herbarium development.

== Biography ==
Received his diploma from the University of Horticulture, Budapest in 1976. From that year Istvan Racz has worked at the Botanical Department of the Hungarian Natural History Museum as a member of the Dendrological Documentation project. Received doctorate and then Ph.D from the University of Silviculture in Sopron, Hungary in 1984 and 1997, respectively. As part of the dendrological documentation team led by Zsolt Debreczy research botanist, he had worked in many leading institutes worldwide, including the Arnold Arboretum of Harvard University, also in other major herbaria, arboreta and botanical gardens in the U.S., England, Scotland, Ireland, Germany, and Poland. Istvan Racz also participated in large-scale botanical expeditions led to various parts of the temperate and adjacent zones, including northern North America, Mexico, China, Chile, Japan, Taiwan, New Zealand and Tasmania. Co-author or author of numerous books and scientific articles.

== Selected publications ==
=== Scientific journal articles ===
- Debreczy, Zs.; Rácz, I. (1995). "New species and varieties of conifers from Mexico". Phytologia. 78 (4): 217–243. doi:10.5962/bhl.part.11916.
- Rácz, I., – Huyen, D. D. (2007): Study of a low-elevation occurrence of Pinus dalatensis Ferré (Pinaceae) in Gia Lai Province, Vietnam. Studia bot. hung. 38: 133–142.

=== Books ===
- Vajda, L. – Rácz, I. Flora Photographica Hungarica. (text with: Zs. Debreczy & F. Németh) Képzőművészeti Kiadó, Budapest. 180 p. 1984 (in Hungarian). ISBN 963-336-324-1
- Debreczy, Zs. & Rácz, I.: Fenyők a Föld Körül (Conifers Around the Earth). in Hungarian with English summary. Dendrological Foundation, Budapest, 2000. pp. 552. ISBN 963-00-5898-7
- Debreczy, Zs. – Rácz, I. (2011): Conifers Around the World. DendroPress Ltd., Budapest. pp. 1089. ISBN 978-963-219-061-7

== Awards ==
- Award of Excellence, Ministry of Education and Culture, Hungary. 1979
- Honorary Professor, Budapest Corvinus University (2013)

== Fellowships ==
- Mercer Fellowship, Arnold Arboretum of Harvard University, United States (1988–1990)
- Synthesys Project (EU), Royal Botanic Garden, Edinburgh, Scotland (2011)
- Visiting Scientist, Kyoto University, Japan (2013)
