= 2006 Porsche Carrera Cup Germany =

Motor racing competition

Seasons
- ← 2005 2007 →

The 2006 Porsche Carrera Cup Deutschland season was the 21st German Porsche Carrera Cup season. It began on 9 April at Hockenheim and finished on 29 October at the same circuit, after nine rounds. It ran as a support championship for the 2006 DTM season. Dirk Werner won the championship beating Uwe Alzen by 11 points.

== Teams and drivers ==
| Team | No. | Drivers | Rounds |
|---|---|---|---|
| (Germany) UPS Porsche Junior Team | 1 | (Germany) Jan Seyffarth | All |
| (Germany) UPS Porsche Junior Team | 2 | (Germany) Lance David Arnold | All |
| (Germany) EUC Buchbinder ARAXA Racing | 3 | (France) Nicolas Armindo | 1–4 |
| (Germany) EUC Buchbinder ARAXA Racing | 3 | (United Kingdom) Richard Westbrook | 5–9 |
| (Germany) EUC Buchbinder ARAXA Racing | 27 | (Germany) Bernd Maylander | 1, 5 |
| (Germany) EUC Buchbinder ARAXA Racing | 27 | (Germany) Christoph Langen | 2–4, 7 |
| (Germany) EUC Buchbinder ARAXA Racing | 27 | (Germany) Marc Basseng | 6 |
| (Germany) EUC Buchbinder ARAXA Racing | 27 | (Switzerland) Michel Frey | 8 |
| (Germany) EUC Buchbinder ARAXA Racing | 27 | (Brazil) Bruno Senna | 9 |
| (Germany) Farnbacher PZN-PÜ-ER | 5 | (Germany) Dirk Werner | All |
| (Germany) Farnbacher PZN-PÜ-ER | 6 | (United States) Ian Baas | All |
| (Germany) Car Salon Ahlden | 7 | (Germany) Manfred Ahlden | All |
| (Germany) Car Salon Ahlden | 8 | (Germany) Timm Sandmayer | All |
| (Germany) Land Motorsport PZ Koblenz | 9 | (Czech Republic) Jiří Janák | 1–3, 5–9 |
| (Germany) Land Motorsport PZ Koblenz | 9 | (Germany) Dominik Farnbacher | 4 |
| (Germany) Land Motorsport PZ Koblenz | 10 | (Germany) Philipp Wlazik | All |
| (Germany) HP Team Herberth | 11 | (Germany) Uwe Alzen | All |
| (Germany) HP Team Herberth | 12 | (Germany) Dominik Schwager | All |
| (Germany) MRS PC-Service Team PZM | 14 | (Netherlands) Menno Kuus | 1, 6 |
| (Germany) MRS PC-Service Team PZM | 14 | (Germany) Georg Braun | 2 |
| (Germany) MRS PC-Service Team PZM | 14 | (Germany) Tim Bergmeister | 3 |
| (Germany) MRS PC-Service Team PZM | 14 | (Austria) Norbert Schratter | 4, 9 |
| (Germany) MRS PC-Service Team PZM | 14 | (Sweden) Jimmy Jacobsson | 5 |
| (Germany) MRS PC-Service Team PZM | 14 | (Germany) Ralf Kalaschek | 7 |
| (Germany) MRS PC-Service Team PZM | 14 | (Netherlands) Patrick Huisman | 8 |
| (Germany) MRS PC-Service Team PZM | 15 | (Netherlands) Duncan Huisman | 1–3 |
| (Germany) MRS PC-Service Team PZM | 15 | (United Kingdom) Kelvin Burt | 4–8 |
| (Germany) MRS PC-Service Team PZM | 15 | (Netherlands) Patrick Huisman | 9 |
| (Germany) MRS PC-Service Team PZM | 35 | (Germany) Michael Raja | 9 |
| (Germany) Vertu-Racing PZ-Hofheim | 16 | (Germany) Oliver Mayer | All |
| (Germany) Vertu-Racing PZ-Hofheim | 17 | (Germany) Matthias Weiland | All |
| (Germany) Schnabel Engineering PZ Siegen | 18 | (Germany) Jörg Hardt | All |
| (Germany) Schnabel Engineering PZ Siegen | 19 | (Germany) Thomas Messer | All |
| (Germany) Mamerow Racing PZ-Essen | 20 | (Germany) Alaxander Roloff | 1–7 |
| (Germany) Mamerow Racing PZ-Essen | 21 | (Germany) Christian Mamerow | All |
| (Austria) B.E.M. Brückl Motorsport Team | 24 | (Austria) Martin Brückl | All |
| (Austria) B.E.M. Brückl Motorsport Team | 25 | (Germany) Thomas Riethmüller | All |
| (Poland) Fuchs-Star-Moto Racing | 28 | (Poland) Maciej Stanco | All |
| (Poland) Fuchs-Star-Moto Racing | 29 | (Italy) Andrea Mancin | 1 |
| (Poland) Fuchs-Star-Moto Racing | 29 | (Poland) Maciej Marcinkiewicz | 2 |
| (Poland) Fuchs-Star-Moto Racing | 29 | (Czech Republic) Adam Lacko | 3–5, 7–8 |
| (Poland) Fuchs-Star-Moto Racing | 29 | (Poland) Robert Lukas | 6 |
| (Poland) Fuchs-Star-Moto Racing | 29 | (Austria) Norbert Walchhofer | 9 |
| (Netherlands) Harders Plaza Racing | 30 | (Netherlands) Robert van den Berg | 1, 6 |
| (Netherlands) Harders Plaza Racing | 31 | (Netherlands) Patrick Huisman | 6 |
| (Netherlands) Team Bleekemolen | 32 | (Netherlands) Michael Bleekemolen | 6 |
| (Netherlands) Team Bleekemolen | 33 | (Netherlands) Jeroen Bleekemolen | 6 |
| (France) Pilotage Passion | 34 | (France) Henry Hassid | 8 |
| (Germany) tolimit motorsport | 43 | (France) Nicolas Armindo | 5–9 |
| (Germany) tolimit motorsport | 44 | (Germany) Christian Menzel | All |
| (Germany) tolimit motorsport | 45 | (Germany) Hannes Plesse | 1–5, 9 |
| (Germany) tolimit motorsport | 46 | (Austria) Richard Lietz | All |
| (Turkey) Attempto Racing | 77 | (Germany) Dietmar Haggenmüller | 1–3 |
| (Turkey) Attempto Racing | 77 | (Austria) Josef Strobl | 4–6 |
| (Turkey) Attempto Racing | 77 | (Germany) Jan-Erik Slooten | 7, 9 |
| (Turkey) Attempto Racing | 99 | (Turkey) Arkin Aka | All |

== Race calendar and results ==
| Round | Circuit | Date | Pole position | Fastest lap | Winning driver | Winning team |
|---|---|---|---|---|---|---|
| 1 | (Germany) Hockenheimring | 9 April | (Germany) Dirk Werner | (Germany) Uwe Alzen | (Germany) Uwe Alzen | (Germany) HP Team Herberth |
| 2 | (Germany) EuroSpeedway Lausitz | 30 April | (Germany) Jörg Hardt | (Austria) Richard Lietz | (Germany) Jörg Hardt | (Germany) Schnabel Engineering PZ Siegen |
| 3 | (Germany) Oschersleben | 21 May | (Germany) Uwe Alzen | (Austria) Richard Lietz | (Germany) Uwe Alzen | (Germany) HP Team Herberth |
| 4 | (Germany) Norisring | 23 July | (Germany) Uwe Alzen | (Germany) Uwe Alzen | (Germany) Dirk Werner | (Germany) Farnbacher PZN-PÜ-ER |
| 5 | (Germany) Nürburgring Short | 20 August | (Germany) Dirk Werner | (Germany) Uwe Alzen | (Germany) Dirk Werner | (Germany) Farnbacher PZN-PÜ-ER |
| 6 | (Netherlands) Zandvoort | 3 September | (Austria) Richard Lietz | (Netherlands) Patrick Huisman | (United Kingdom) Richard Westbrook | (Germany) EUC Buchbinder ARAXA Racing |
| 7 | (Spain) Circuit de Catalunya National | 24 September | (Germany) Dirk Werner | (United Kingdom) Richard Westbrook | (Austria) Richard Lietz | (Germany) tolimit motorsport |
| 8 | (France) Bugatti Circuit | 15 October | (Germany) Uwe Alzen | (United Kingdom) Richard Westbrook | (Germany) Uwe Alzen | (Germany) HP Team Herberth |
| 9 | (Germany) Hockenheimring | 29 October | (Germany) Uwe Alzen | (Germany) Uwe Alzen | (Germany) Uwe Alzen | (Germany) HP Team Herberth |

== Championship standings ==
Points system
| **1st** | **2nd** | **3rd** | **4th** | **5th** | **6th** | **7th** | **8th** | **9th** | **10th** | **11th** | **12th** | **13th** | **14th** | **15th** |
| 20 | 18 | 16 | 14 | 12 | 10 | 9 | 8 | 7 | 6 | 5 | 4 | 3 | 2 | 1 |

=== Drivers' championship ===
| Pos | Driver | HOC (Germany) | LAU (Germany) | OSC (Germany) | NOR (Germany) | NÜR (Germany) | ZAN (Netherlands) | CAT (Spain) | BUG (France) | HOC (Germany) | Pts |
|---|---|---|---|---|---|---|---|---|---|---|---|
| 1 | (Germany) Dirk Werner | **2** | 2 | 3 | 1 | **1** | 5 | **Ret** | 3 | 2 | 144 |
| 2 | (Germany) Uwe Alzen | 1 | Ret | **1** | **14** | 2 | 3 | 6 | **1** | **1** | 133 |
| 3 | (Germany) Jörg Hardt | Ret | **1** | 5 | 6 | Ret | 6 | 2 | 5 | 5 | 104 |
| 4 | (Austria) Richard Lietz | 4 | 9 | 2 | 2 | 23 | **8** | 1 | 23 | 11 | 95 |
| 5 | (Germany) Christian Mamerow | 9 | 5 | 8 | 3 | 4 | 4 | Ret | 4 | 24† | 93 |
| 6 | (France) Nicolas Armindo | 3 | 4 | 6 | Ret | 7 | 11 | Ret | 7 | 4 | 84 |
| 7 | (Germany) Lance David Arnold | 7 | Ret | 4 | 5 | 11 | 14 | 3 | Ret | 6 | 77 |
| 8 | (Germany) Dominik Schwager | 14 | 6 | 10 | 7 | 5 | 13 | 7 | Ret | DNS | 60 |
| 9 | (Germany) Christian Menzel | 8 | 8 | 23 | Ret | 22† | 9 | 4 | 10 | 7 | 58 |
| 10 | (Germany) Jan Seyffarth | 5 | Ret | 13 | 11 | 6 | 12 | 24† | 9 | 20 | 49 |
| 11 | (Germany) Alexander Roloff | 11 | 7 | 9 | 8 | Ret | 16 | 9 | | | 43 |
| 12 | (United Kingdom) Kelvin Burt | | | | Ret | 9 | 10 | 8 | 6 | | 38 |
| 13 | (Netherlands) Duncan Huisman | 6 | 3 | 7 | | | | | | | 35 |
| 14 | (Germany) Thomas Riethmüller | Ret | 10 | Ret | Ret | 8 | 17 | 23† | 11 | 8 | 34 |
| 15 | (Germany) Philipp Wlazik | 13 | Ret | 21 | 10 | 14 | 18 | 11 | 13 | Ret | 30 |
| 16 | (Czech Republic) Jiří Janák | 15 | Ret | 12 | | 12 | 19 | 10 | Ret | 9 | 29 |
| 17 | (United States) Ian Baas | Ret | 11 | 11 | 9 | Ret | 32 | 25† | 24 | 10 | 25 |
| 18 | (Germany) Oliver Mayer | 16 | Ret | 17 | 13 | 20 | 25 | 13 | 17 | 14 | 17 |
| 19 | (Czech Republic) Adam Lacko | | | 14 | 12 | 15 | | 18 | 14 | | 15 |
| 20 | (Austria) Martin Brückl | 25 | 14 | 18 | 19 | 13 | 24 | 12 | 25 | 16 | 14 |
| 21 | (Germany) Thomas Messer | 18 | 12 | 24 | Ret | 19 | 20 | 14 | Ret | 13 | 13 |
| 22 | (Poland) Maciej Stanco | 21 | 13 | Ret | Ret | 16 | 23 | 17 | 15 | Ret | 10 |
| 23 | (Germany) Manfred Ahlden | 22 | 19 | 15 | Ret | 21 | 27 | 20 | 18 | 15 | 6 |
| 24 | (Germany) Matthias Weiland | 24 | 16 | 19 | Ret | 18 | 31 | 16 | 20 | 17 | 4 |
| 25 | (Turkey) Arkin Aka | 20 | 15 | 20 | 16 | 25 | 30 | 21 | 21 | 18 | 3 |
| 26 | (Germany) Hannes Plesse | 27 | 18 | 16 | 17 | 17 | | | | DNS | 2 |
| | (Germany) Timm Sandmayer | 26 | 23 | Ret | 18 | 24 | 29 | 19 | 22† | 21 | 0 |
guest drivers ineligible for championship points
| | (United Kingdom) Richard Westbrook | | | | | 3 | 1 | 5 | 2 | 3 | 0 |
| | (Netherlands) Jeroen Bleekemolen | | | | | | 2 | | | | 0 |
| | (Germany) Dominik Farnbacher | | | | 4 | | | | | | 0 |
| | (Netherlands) Patrick Huisman | | | | | | 7 | | 8 | 22† | 0 |
| | (Germany) Bernd Mayländer | 10 | | | | 10 | | | | | 0 |
| | (Germany) Jan-Erik Slooten | | | | | | | 15 | | 12 | 0 |
| | (Netherlands) Robert van den Berg | 12 | | | | | Ret | | | | 0 |
| | (Switzerland) Michel Frey | | | | | | | | 12 | | 0 |
| | (Germany) Christoph Langen | | 20 | Ret | 15 | | | 22 | | | 0 |
| | (Germany) Marc Basseng | | | | | | 15 | | | | 0 |
| | (France) Henry Hassid | | | | | | | | 16 | | 0 |
| | (Netherlands) Menno Kuus | 17 | | | | | 21 | | | | 0 |
| | (Germany) Georg Braun | | 17 | | | | | | | | 0 |
| | (Italy) Andrea Mancin | 19 | | | | | | | | | 0 |
| | (Germany) Michael Raja | | | | | | | | | 19 | 0 |
| | (Austria) Josef Strobl | | | | 20 | Ret | 26 | | | | 0 |
| | (Germany) Dietmar Haggenmüller | 23 | 21 | 22 | | | | | | | 0 |
| | (Poland) Maciej Marcinkiewicz | | 22 | | | | | | | | 0 |
| | (Netherlands) Michael Bleekemolen | | | | | | 22 | | | | 0 |
| | (Brazil) Bruno Senna | | | | | | | | | 23† | 0 |
| | (Poland) Robert Lukas | | | | | | 28 | | | | 0 |
| | (Austria) Norbert Schratter | | | | Ret | | | | | Ret | 0 |
| | (Germany) Tim Bergmeister | | | Ret | | | | | | | 0 |
| | (Sweden) Jimmy Jacobsson | | | | | Ret | | | | | 0 |
| | (Austria) Norbert Walchhofer | | | | | | | | | Ret | 0 |
| | (Germany) Ralf Kalaschek | | | | | | | DNS | | | 0 |
| Pos | Driver | HOC (Germany) | LAU (Germany) | OSC (Germany) | NOR (Germany) | NÜR (Germany) | ZAN (Netherlands) | CAT (Spain) | BUG (France) | HOC (Germany) | Pts |

| Colour | Result |
|---|---|
| Gold | Winner |
| Silver | Second place |
| Bronze | Third place |
| Green | Points classification |
| Blue | Non-points classification |
| Blue | Non-classified finish (NC) |
| Purple | Retired, not classified (Ret) |
| Red | Did not qualify (DNQ) |
| Red | Did not pre-qualify (DNPQ) |
| Black | Disqualified (DSQ) |
| White | Did not start (DNS) |
| White | Withdrew (WD) |
| White | Race cancelled (C) |
| Blank | Did not practice (DNP) |
| Blank | Did not arrive (DNA) |
| Blank | Excluded (EX) |

**Bold** – Pole
Italics – Fastest Lap

† — Drivers did not finish the race, but were classified as they completed over 90% of the race distance.
