= 2005 Porsche Carrera Cup Germany =

Seasons
- ← 2004 2006 →

The 2005 Porsche Carrera Cup Deutschland season was the 20th German Porsche Carrera Cup season. It began on 17 April at Hockenheim and finished on 23 October at the same circuit, after seven rounds. It ran as a support championship for the 2005 DTM season. Christian Menzel won the championship by 12 points and finishing on the podium in all seven races. This season was also the last season along with quite a few of the other domestic championships that the 996 model was raced. It was replaced with the 997 model for the 2006 season after it was first introduced in the Porsche Supercup in the same year.

== Teams and drivers ==
| Team | No. | Drivers | Rounds |
|---|---|---|---|
| (Germany) UPS Porsche Junior Team | 1 | (Germany) Jan Seyffarth | All |
| (Germany) UPS Porsche Junior Team | 2 | (Germany) Lance David Arnold | All |
| (Germany) EMC ARAXA Racing | 3 | (France) Nicolas Armindo | All |
| (Germany) EMC ARAXA Racing | 27 | (Germany) Sven Heidfeld | 1 |
| (Germany) EMC ARAXA Racing | 27 | (France) Anthony Beltoise | 2, 7 |
| (Germany) EMC ARAXA Racing | 27 | (United Kingdom) Peter Dumbreck | 3 |
| (Germany) EMC ARAXA Racing | 27 | (Belgium) Vanina Ickx | 4 |
| (Germany) EMC ARAXA Racing | 27 | (Germany) Mark Warnecke | 5 |
| (Germany) Eichin Racing | 5 | (Germany) Alexander Roloff | All |
| (Germany) Eichin Racing | 6 | (Germany) Dominik Farnbacher | All |
| (Germany) Eichin Racing | 37 | (Switzerland) Boris Hrubesch | 6–7 |
| (Germany) MRS PC-Service Team | 7 | (Germany) Thomas Riethmüller | All |
| (Germany) MRS PC-Service Team | 8 | (Germany) Roland Asch | 1, 3, 5, 7 |
| (Germany) MRS PC-Service Team | 8 | (Germany) Dirk Werner | 2, 4 |
| (Germany) MRS PC-Service Team | 8 | (Netherlands) Duncan Huisman | 6 |
| (Germany) Land Motorsport | 9 | (Germany) Frank Schmickler | 1 |
| (Germany) Land Motorsport | 9 | (Germany) Kersten Jodexnis | 3 |
| (Germany) Land Motorsport | 10 | (Lithuania) Aivaras Pyragius | 2 |
| (Germany) Land Motorsport | 10 | (Russia) Oleg Kesselman | 3–4, 6–7 |
| (Germany) Land Motorsport | 10 | (New Zealand) Peter Scharmach | 5 |
| (Germany) Land Motorsport | 10 | (Sweden) Alx Danielsson | 7 |
| (Germany) Land Motorsport | 35 | (Germany) Florian Albrecht | 5, 7 |
| (Germany) Herberth Motorsport | 11 | (Germany) Alfred Renauer | 4–7 |
| (Germany) Herberth Motorsport | 12 | (Germany) Robert Renauer | 1–5, 7 |
| (Austria) B/E/M Brückl Motorsport | 14 | (Austria) Marco Schärf | All |
| (Germany) Barthlomeyczik Motorsport | 16 | (Germany) Marco Barthlomeyczik | 1–4, 6–7 |
| (Germany) Barthlomeyczik Motorsport | 16 | (Germany) Bertram Hornung | 5 |
| (Germany) Barthlomeyczik Motorsport | 41 | (Germany) Bertram Hornung | 7 |
| (Germany) Schnabl Engineering | 17 | (Germany) Christopher Brück | 2–5, 7 |
| (Netherlands) Harders Plaza Racing | 19 | (Netherlands) Robert van den Berg | All |
| (Germany) Mamerow Racing | 21 | (Germany) Christian Mamerow | All |
| (Germany) Rotpunkt Sport | 23 | (Germany) Albert Daffner | 1–2 |
| (Germany) Rotpunkt Sport | 24 | (Germany) Dietmar Haggenmüller | 1–2, 4–7 |
| (Germany) GM Sports | 25 | (Germany) Gerhard Mannsperger | 7 |
| (Germany) GM Sports | 42 | (Germany) Dieter Dürr | 7 |
| (Germany) GM Sports | 43 | (Germany) Jürgen Bender | 7 |
| Podium MS Sweden | 31 | (Sweden) Fredrik Ros | 1, 7 |
| Podium MS Sweden | 32 | (Sweden) Hakan Ricknäs | 1 |
| Podium MS Sweden | 38 | (Sweden) Jan Nilsson | 7 |
| (Austria) Schratter Racing Team | 33 | (Austria) Norbert Schratter | 4–5, 7 |
| (Germany) AKF Motorsport | 34 | (Germany) Oliver Freymuth | 3–7 |
| (Germany) AKF Motorsport | 47 | (Germany) Martin Dechent | 7 |
| (Germany) tolimit Motorsport | 39 | (Germany) Christian Menzel | All |
| (Germany) tolimit Motorsport | 46 | (Austria) Richard Lietz | All |
| (Germany) MRP Motorsport | 44 | (Germany) Michael Raja | All |
| (Germany) Farnbacher Racing | 50 | (Germany) Marco Seefried | 4, 6–7 |
| (Germany) Farnbacher Racing | 55 | (Germany) Jörg Hardt | 1–5 |
| (Germany) Farnbacher Racing | 60 | (Germany) Hermann Speck | 4 |
| (Germany) Farnbacher Racing | 66 | (Germany) Sebastian Zollhöfer | 1 |
| (Germany) Farnbacher Racing | 66 | (Austria) Dieter Svepes | 2–7 |
| (Turkey) Attempto Racing | 36 | (Turkey) Arda Aka | 6 |
| (Turkey) Attempto Racing | 45 | (Germany) Kai Phister | 7 |
| (Turkey) Attempto Racing | 99 | (Turkey) Arkin Aka | All |

== Race calendar and results ==
| Round | Circuit | Date | Pole position | Fastest lap | Winning driver | Winning team |
|---|---|---|---|---|---|---|
| 1 | (Germany) Hockenheimring | 17 April | (Germany) Christian Menzel | (Germany) Jörg Hardt | (Germany) Christian Menzel | (Germany) tolimit Motorsport |
| 2 | (Germany) EuroSpeedway Lausitz | 1 May | (Germany) Christian Menzel | (Germany) Christian Menzel | (Germany) Christian Menzel | (Germany) tolimit Motorsport |
| 3 | (Germany) Oschersleben | 26 June | (France) Nicolas Armindo | (Germany) Jörg Hardt | (France) Nicolas Armindo | (Germany) EMC ARAXA Racing |
| 4 | (Germany) Norisring | 17 July | (Germany) Jörg Hardt | (Germany) Christian Menzel | (Germany) Jörg Hardt | (Germany) Farnbacher Racing |
| 5 | (Germany) Nürburgring Short | 7 August | (Germany) Christian Menzel | (Germany) Nicolas Armindo | (Germany) Christian Menzel | (Germany) tolimit Motorsport |
| 6 | (Turkey) Istanbul Park | 2 October | (Germany) Christian Menzel | (Germany) Christian Menzel | (Germany) Christian Menzel | (Germany) tolimit Motorsport |
| 7 | (Germany) Hockenheimring | 23 October | (France) Nicolas Armindo | (Austria) Richard Lietz | (France) Nicolas Armindo | (Germany) EMC ARAXA Racing |

== Championship standings ==
Points system
| **1st** | **2nd** | **3rd** | **4th** | **5th** | **6th** | **7th** | **8th** | **9th** | **10th** | **11th** | **12th** | **13th** | **14th** | **15th** |
| 20 | 18 | 16 | 14 | 12 | 10 | 9 | 8 | 7 | 6 | 5 | 4 | 3 | 2 | 1 |

=== Drivers' championship ===
| Pos | Driver | HOC (Germany) | LAU (Germany) | OSC (Germany) | NOR (Germany) | NÜR (Germany) | IST (Turkey) | HOC (Germany) | Pts |
|---|---|---|---|---|---|---|---|---|---|
| 1 | (Germany) Christian Menzel | **1** | **1** | 3 | 2 | **1** | **1** | 2 | 132 |
| 2 | (France) Nicolas Armindo | 4 | 4 | **1** | 3 | 2 | 2 | **1** | 120 |
| 3 | (Austria) Richard Lietz | 3 | 3 | 4 | 5 | 3 | 5 | 4 | 100 |
| 4 | (Germany) Dominik Farnbacher | 7 | 7 | 2 | 4 | 7 | 11 | 3 | 82 |
| 5 | (Germany) Jörg Hardt | 2 | 2 | Ret | **1** | 4 | | | 70 |
| 6 | (Germany) Lance David Arnold | 8 | 12 | 12 | Ret | 10 | 3 | 7 | 49 |
| 7 | (Germany) Christopher Brück | | 5 | 7 | 7 | 6 | | 10 | 47 |
| 8 | (Germany) Christian Mamerow | 5 | 6 | 8 | 6 | DNS | Ret | 27† | 41 |
| 9 | (Germany) Robert Renauer | 10 | 10 | 5 | 11 | 9 | | 30† | 39 |
| 10 | (Germany) Jan Seyffarth | Ret | 9 | 17† | Ret | 8 | 4 | 9 | 38 |
| 11 | (Austria) Marco Schärf | 13 | Ret | 11 | 9 | 11 | 7 | Ret | 33 |
| 12 | (Germany) Thomas Riethmüller | 6 | Ret | 20† | Ret | Ret | 10 | 5 | 30 |
| 13 | (Austria) Dieter Svepes | | 15 | 14 | 10 | 14 | 8 | 11 | 29 |
| 14 | (Germany) Alexander Roloff | 19 | 11 | 9 | Ret | DNS | 12 | 8 | 28 |
| 15 | (Germany) Roland Asch | Ret | | 13 | | 5 | | 6 | 26 |
| 16 | (Netherlands) Robert van den Berg | 16 | 16 | 10 | 13 | 12 | 19† | 17 | 24 |
| 17 | (Germany) Dietmar Haggenmüller | 14 | 18 | | 16 | 16 | 13 | 18 | 16 |
| 18 | (Germany) Michael Raja | 18 | 14 | Ret | 15 | DNS | 14 | 19 | 13 |
| 19 | (Germany) Albert Daffner | 11 | 17 | | | | | | 6 |
| 20 | (Turkey) Arkin Aka | 17 | 19 | 16 | 19 | 19 | DNS | 20 | 6 |
| 21 | (Germany) Frank Schmickler | 12 | | | | | | | 5 |
| 22 | (Germany) Dirk Werner | | 13 | | Ret | | | | 4 |
| 23 | (Germany) Sebastian Zollhöfer | 15 | | | | | | | 2 |
| 24 | (Germany) Marco Barthlomeyczik | 21† | 21 | Ret | 17 | | Ret | 21 | 2 |
guest drivers ineligible for championship points
| | (United Kingdom) Peter Dumbreck | | | 6 | | | | | 0 |
| | (Germany) Marco Seefried | | | | Ret | | 6 | DNS | 0 |
| | (Germany) Alfred Renauer | | | | 8 | 21† | 9 | 28 | 0 |
| | (Sweden) Fredrik Ros | 9 | | | | | | Ret | 0 |
| | (France) Anthony Beltoise | | 8 | | | | | 29† | 0 |
| | (Belgium) Vanina Ickx | | | | 12 | | | | 0 |
| | (Sweden) Jan Nilsson | | | | | | | 12 | 0 |
| | (New Zealand) Peter Scharmach | | | | | 13 | | | 0 |
| | (Germany) Gerhard Mannsperger | | | | | | | 13 | 0 |
| | (Germany) Oliver Freymuth | | | 15 | 14 | 15 | 16 | 22 | 0 |
| | (Germany) Martin Dechent | | | | | | | 14 | 0 |
| | (Switzerland) Boris Hrubesch | | | | | | 15 | Ret | 0 |
| | (Germany) Jürgen Bender | | | | | | | 15 | 0 |
| | (Germany) Florian Albrecht | | | | | 20 | | 16 | 0 |
| | (Russia) Oleg Kesselman | | | 18 | 18 | | 17 | 24 | 0 |
| | (Germany) Mark Warnecke | | | | | 17 | | | 0 |
| | (Germany) Bertram Hornung | | | | | 18 | | 23 | 0 |
| | (Turkey) Arda Aka | | | | | | 18† | | 0 |
| | (Germany) Kersten Jodexnis | | | 19 | | | | | 0 |
| | (Sweden) Håkan Ricknäs | 20 | | | | | | | 0 |
| | (Lithuania) Aivaras Pyragius | | 20 | | | | | | 0 |
| | (Germany) Hermann Speck | | | | 20 | | | | 0 |
| | (Austria) Norbert Schratter | | | | 21 | 22 | | 25 | 0 |
| | (Germany) Kai Pfister | | | | | | | 26 | 0 |
| | (Germany) Sven Heidfeld | Ret | | | | | | | 0 |
| | (Netherlands) Duncan Huisman | | | | | | Ret | | 0 |
| | (Germany) Dieter Dürr | | | | | | | Ret | 0 |
| | (Sweden) Alx Danielsson | | | | | | | Ret | 0 |
| Pos | Driver | HOC (Germany) | LAU (Germany) | OSC (Germany) | NOR (Germany) | NÜR (Germany) | IST (Turkey) | HOC (Germany) | Pts |

| Colour | Result |
|---|---|
| Gold | Winner |
| Silver | Second place |
| Bronze | Third place |
| Green | Points classification |
| Blue | Non-points classification |
| Blue | Non-classified finish (NC) |
| Purple | Retired, not classified (Ret) |
| Red | Did not qualify (DNQ) |
| Red | Did not pre-qualify (DNPQ) |
| Black | Disqualified (DSQ) |
| White | Did not start (DNS) |
| White | Withdrew (WD) |
| White | Race cancelled (C) |
| Blank | Did not practice (DNP) |
| Blank | Did not arrive (DNA) |
| Blank | Excluded (EX) |

**Bold** – Pole
Italics – Fastest Lap

† — Drivers did not finish the race, but were classified as they completed over 90% of the race distance.

=== Teams' Championship ===
| Pos | Team | HOC (Germany) | LAU (Germany) | OSC (Germany) | NOR (Germany) | NÜR (Germany) | IST (Turkey) | HOC (Germany) | Points |
|---|---|---|---|---|---|---|---|---|---|
| 1 | (Germany) Tolimit Motorsport | 1 | 1 | 3 | 2 | 1 | 1 | 2 | 236 |
| 1 | (Germany) Tolimit Motorsport | 3 | 3 | 4 | 5 | 3 | 5 | 4 | 236 |
| 2 | (Germany) Farnbacher Racing PZN | 2 | 2 | 14 | 1 | 4 | 6 | 11 | 121 |
| 2 | (Germany) Farnbacher Racing PZN | 15 | 15 | Ret | 10 | 14 | 9 | DNS | 121 |
| 3 | (Germany) EMC ARAXA Racing | 4 | 4 | 1 | 3 | 2 | 2 | 1 | 120 |
| 4 | (Germany) Eichin Racing PZ Freiberg | 7 | 7 | 2 | 4 | 7 | 11 | 3 | 112 |
| 4 | (Germany) Eichin Racing PZ Freiberg | 19 | 11 | 9 | Ret | DNS | 12 | 8 | 112 |
| 5 | (Germany) MRS PC-Service Team | 6 | 13 | 13 | Ret | 5 | 10 | 5 | 62 |
| 5 | (Germany) MRS PC-Service Team | Ret | Ret | 20† | Ret | Ret | Ret | 6 | 62 |
| 6 | (Germany) Schnabel Engineering PZ Siegen | | 5 | 7 | 7 | 6 | | 10 | 48 |
| 7 | (Germany) Robert Renauer | 10 | 10 | 5 | 11 | 9 | | 30† | 41 |
| 8 | (Germany) Mamerow Racing PZ Essen | 5 | 6 | 8 | 6 | DNS | Ret | 27† | 40 |
| 9 | (Austria) B.E.M Brückl Motorsport Team | 13 | Ret | 11 | 9 | 11 | 7 | Ret | 37 |
| 10 | (Netherlands) Harders' Plaza Racing | 16 | 16 | 10 | 13 | 12 | 19† | 17 | 27 |
| 11 | (Germany) ARAXA BUCHBINDER RACING | Ret | 8 | 6 | 12 | 17 | | 29† | 25 |
| 11 | (Germany) Land Motorsport | 12 | 20 | 18 | 18 | 13 | 17 | 24 | 17 |
| 11 | (Germany) Land Motorsport | | | 19 | | 20 | | | 17 |
| 13 | (Germany) Michael Raja | 18 | 14 | Ret | 15 | DNS | 14 | 19 | 17 |
| 14 | (Germany) Dietmar Haggenmüller | | | | 16 | 16 | 13 | 18 | 16 |
| 15 | (Germany) Rotpunkt Sport | 11 | 17 | | | | | | 12 |
| 15 | (Germany) Rotpunkt Sport | 14 | 18 | | | | | | 12 |
| 16 | (Turkey) Attempto Racing | 17 | 19 | 16 | 19 | 19 | DNS | 20 | 7 |
| 17 | (Germany) Marco Barthlomeyczik | 21† | 21 | Ret | 17 | | Ret | 21 | 3 |
| 8 | (Germany) Bertram Hornung | | | | | 18 | | 23 | 1 |
teams ineligible for championship points
| | (Germany) UPS Porsche Junior Team | 8 | 9 | 12 | Ret | 8 | 3 | 7 | 0 |
| | (Germany) UPS Porsche Junior Team | Ret | 12 | 17† | Ret | 10 | 4 | 9 | 0 |
| | Podium MS Sweden | 9 | | | | | | 12 | 0 |
| | Podium MS Sweden | 20 | | | | | | Ret | 0 |
| | (Germany) GM Sports | | | | | | | 13 | 0 |
| | (Germany) GM Sports | | | | | | | 15 | 0 |
| | (Germany) AKF Motorsport | | | 15 | 14 | 15 | 16 | 14 | 0 |
| | (Germany) AKF Motorsport | | | | | | | 22 | 0 |
| | (Austria) Schratter Racing Team | | | | 21 | 22 | | 25 | 0 |
| Pos | Team | HOC (Germany) | LAU (Germany) | OSC (Germany) | NOR (Germany) | NÜR (Germany) | IST (Turkey) | HOC (Germany) | Points |
