= Manthey Racing =

German auto racing team

(Germany) Manthey Racing
- Founded: 1996
- Base: Meuspath, Rhineland-Palatinate, Germany
- Team principal(s): Nicolas Raeder
- Founder(s): Olaf Manthey
- Current series: Asian Le Mans Series; Deutsche Tourenwagen Masters; FIA World Endurance Championship; IMSA SportsCar Championship; Nürburgring Langstrecken-Serie
- Former series: 24H Series; ADAC GT Masters; American Le Mans Series; Blancpain GT Series Endurance Cup; GT2 European Series; International GT Open; Porsche Carrera Cup Germany; Porsche Supercup
- Noted drivers: (Germany) Timo Bernhard (Italy) Matteo Cairoli (Denmark) Michael Christensen (France) Romain Dumas (France) Kévin Estre (Netherlands) Patrick Huisman (Germany) Marc Lieb (Austria) Richard Lietz (Germany) Lucas Luhr (France) Frédéric Makowiecki (Italy) Riccardo Pera (Germany) Mike Rockenfeller (United Kingdom) Nick Tandy (Germany) Marcel Tiemann (Belgium) Laurens Vanthoor (Turkey) Ayhancan Güven (Austria) Thomas Preining
- Teams' Championships: 1997, 1998, 1999, 2000 Porsche Supercup, 2015 FIA WEC LMGTE Pro, 2023, 2025, 2026 DTM, 2024, 2025 FIA WEC LMGT3, 2024–25 ALMS
- Drivers' Championships: 1997, 1998, 1999, 2000 Porsche Supercup, 2015 FIA WEC LMGTE Pro, 2023, 2025, 2026 DTM, 2024, 2025 FIA WEC LMGT3, 2024–25 ALMS
- Website: https://www.manthey-racing.de/en/home

Manthey Racing GmbH is a German auto racing team and tuning company established in 1996 by former race car driver Olaf Manthey. Most notable for their participation at the Nürburgring 24 Hours, they also compete in the Asian Le Mans Series, Deutsche Tourenwagen Masters, and IMSA SportsCar Championship, and are also responsible for Porsche's factory LMGT3 efforts in the FIA World Endurance Championship. Working with Porsche sports cars for most of their history, the team has been strongly linked with the German manufacturer as a certified Porsche partner, with Porsche also owning a 67% majority stake in the team.

== Background ==
Retiring after the 1993 season of the original DTM series, Olaf Manthey began working for Persson Motorsport in 1994, which ran Mercedes-Benz race cars. After the Deutsche Tourenwagen Meisterschaft series folded in 1996, Olaf Manthey established his own racing team, Olaf Manthey Racing, in the municipality of Rheinbreitbach. On 1 April 2000, Manthey Racing moved to their current location in the municipality of Meuspath.

On 15 December 2013, German racing outfit Raeder Motorsport was merged into Manthey Racing, at which time Porsche acquired a 51% majority stake in the team. Hartmut Kristen, Vice President of Porsche Motorsport, stated that Olaf Manthey approached Porsche on the opportunity to keep the team operational, as his son had died in a car accident in 2007 and had since also learned that his daughter had no interest in taking over ownership of the team. Raeder Motorsport's founders and brothers Nicolas and Martin Raeder assumed management roles, each acquiring a 20% minority stake in the team, while Olaf Manthey retained a 9% minority share. In 2021, Manthey Racing became a certified Porsche partner. Porsche purchased a further 16% share of the company in 2026, increasing their majority stake to 67%.

Since 2023, Manthey Racing has worked collaboratively with Australian racing team EMA Motorsport in a majority of their races and series. In their first year together as a collaborative effort, they competed in the Bathurst 12 Hour, Deutsche Tourenwagen Masters, Nürburgring 24 Hours, Nürburgring Langstrecken-Serie, and Spa 24 Hours with considerable levels of success.

== Racing history ==
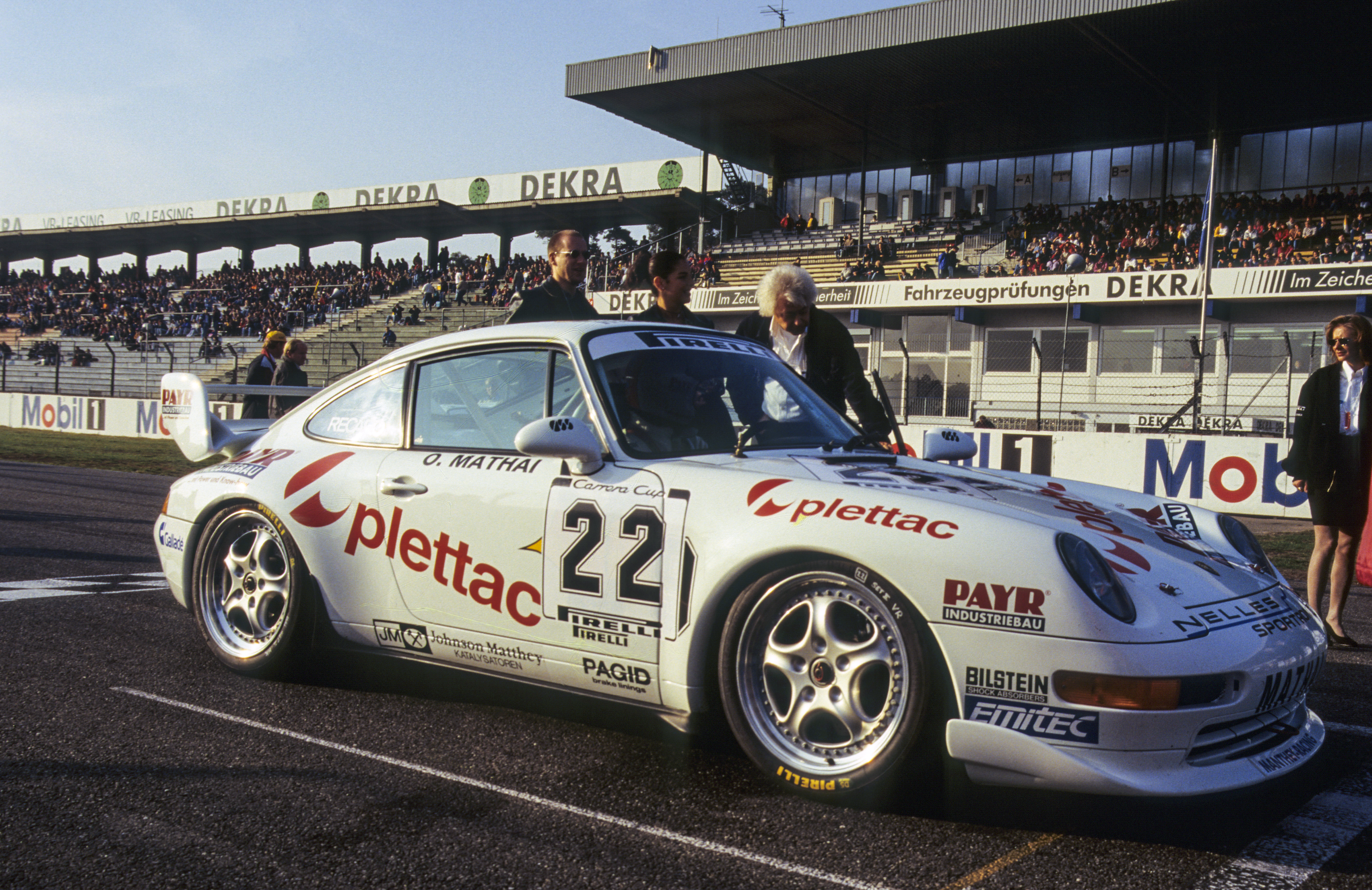
Manthey Racing's Porsche 911 (993) GT3 Cup 3.8 driven by Oliver Mathai in the Porsche Supercup.

The team's motorsport debut came in the Porsche Supercup in 1996, finishing 4th in the teams' standings with 158 points. The next four seasons between 1997 and 2000 saw high levels of success for the team, securing four consecutive teams' and drivers' championships for Manthey Racing and Dutch driver Patrick Huisman, whose four titles remains the most won by any driver in the Porsche Supercup. Manthey Racing also made their first competitive appearances in the Nürburgring in 1998 and the Circuit de la Sarthe in 1999, two locations that Manthey would later become regular competitors at as works entries with Porsche.

Manthey Racing competed in German touring car racing with Mercedes-Benz machinery in 1992, 2001, and 2002, with a best finish of 3rd in the DTM teams' standings in 2001 with Huisman, Bernd Mayländer, and Marcel Tiemann. After a period of 21 years, the team returned to DTM circles in the 2023 Deutsche Tourenwagen Masters, where they won both drivers' and teams' championships with Dennis Olsen and series champion Thomas Preining. After a down year in the 2024 Deutsche Tourenwagen Masters, Manthey bounced back to win both titles in the 2025 Deutsche Tourenwagen Masters, with Ayhancan Güven ending the season as champion.

Manthey Racing raced in the Bathurst 12 Hour for the first time at the 2023 Bathurst 12 Hour, where the team of Preining, Matt Campbell, Mathieu Jaminet scored a 2nd-place finish overall on their first attempt, less than a second behind overall winners SunEnergy1 Racing. On Manthey's second attempt, they won the 2024 Bathurst 12 Hour, winning outright with #912 driven by Campbell, Ayhancan Güven, and Laurens Vanthoor, and in Pro-Am with #911 driven by Yasser Shahin, Alessio Picariello, and Harry King. The team also competed in the Asian Le Mans Series for the first time in 2024–25 and won in dominant fashion, occupying the top two spots in the GT class standings and winning the title with #92 driven by Antares Au, Klaus Bachler, and Joel Sturm, receiving an invite to the 2025 24 Hours of Le Mans in the process. In 2026, Manthey Racing entered the 2026 IMSA SportsCar Championship, committing to a Michelin Endurance Cup campaign.

=== 24 Hours of Nürburgring ===
Manthey Racing's first run at the Nürburgring in any competitive capacity came in 1998, winning a VLN race outright with a Porsche 911 GT2 after 3 hours and 25 minutes of racing. Since then, Manthey Racing has been a regular competitor at the Nürburgring, most notably in the 24 Hours of Nürburgring endurance event, in which they've participated annually since 2006, with 2012 being their only absence as Olaf Manthey opted to enter the International GT Open instead. They are the most successful team in the event, with a record-setting seven overall victories, tied by Scherer Sport PHX in 2024.

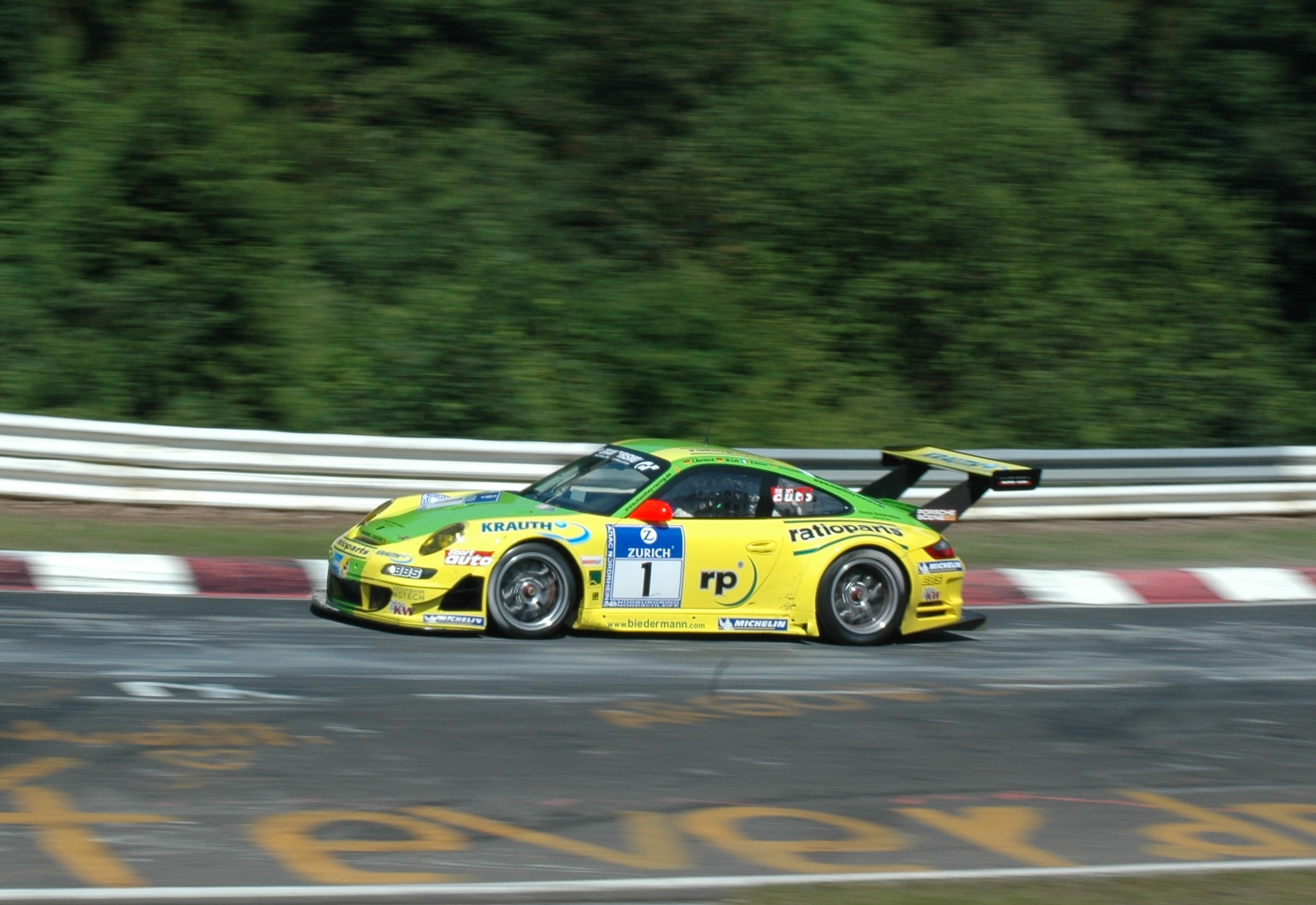
The 2007 24 Hours of Nürburgring race-winning #1 Manthey Racing 997 GT3 RSR in the team's signature "Grello" livery.

The team's first of several appearances at the 24 Hours of Nürburgring came in 2006, entering with additional factory driver support from Porsche, running a 996-generation 911 GT3. Lucas Luhr, Timo Bernhard, Mike Rockenfeller, and Marcel Tiemann took victory for Manthey Racing in the event, and due to favorable conditions and stiff competition from rival cars, also achieved what was then a new overall distance record (3,832 km (2,381 mi) in 151 laps). Manthey would secure three further overall victories in the next three years (2007, 2008, 2009) while also retaining the same lineup of four drivers. After an unsuccessful campaign in 2010 which saw all but one Manthey car retire, the team returned to winning form in 2011. Manthey did not participate in 2012 as Olaf Manthey opted to compete in the International GT Open, but returned in 2013, finishing 7th overall with Bernhard, Dumas, Lieb, and Lucas Luhr and winning the SP7 class. The class win also marked Porsche's 500th group victory at the Nürburgring.

After a seven-year drought, Manthey took their sixth overall victory at the 2018 24 Hours of Nürburgring. In 2021, Manthey secured a record-setting seventh victory at the 2021 24 Hours of Nürburgring after just nine hours of racing. In 2025, Manthey took pole position and the win on the road, however, they suffered a 100-second penalty following Kévin Estre's collision with Dörr Motorsport's Aston Martin Vantage AMR GT4, and fell to 2nd.

=== FIA World Endurance Championship ===
Before joining the FIA World Endurance Championship and competing in the 24 Hours of Le Mans under Porsche's works programme, Manthey Racing made its Le Mans debut as a privateer in the 1999 24 Hours of Le Mans, entering a Porsche 996 GT3 R. The team won on their first attempt in the LMGT class with Huisman, Uwe Alzen, and Luca Riccitelli. Manthey Racing has supported Porsche's works programme in the series since 2013.

Porsche and Manthey entered their first season together in 2013 in the FIA World Endurance Championship with the newly-unveiled Porsche 911 RSR. The team selected Jörg Bergmeister, Patrick Pilet, Timo Bernhard, Marc Lieb, Richard Lietz, and Romain Dumas for the lineups. The team scored six podiums throughout the season, including a 1-2 victory at the 24 Hours of Le Mans. They would finish 3rd and 4th in the LM GTE Pro teams' standings.

For the 2014 FIA World Endurance Championship, Porsche and Manthey would finish 2nd and 4th with their #92 and #91 entries respectively, taking two wins and eight podiums, including a 3rd place finish in the LM GTE Pro class at the 2014 24 Hours of Le Mans. Bernhard, Dumas, and Lieb were replaced with Frédéric Makowiecki, Nick Tandy, and Marco Holzer, as the former three would drive for Porsche's Le Mans Prototype team. Building on their progress the following year, Porsche and Manthey were able to secure the FIA Endurance Trophy for the LM GTE Pro class in the 2015 FIA World Endurance Championship. Lietz also won the LM GTE drivers' championship that year, known as the 'World Endurance Cup for GT Drivers'. From 2016 to 2023, the Manthey name was removed from the entry lists, though the team continued to help support Porsche's LM GTE efforts. In 2022, Porsche, with Manthey Racing's help, prepped two Porsche 911 Turbo S sports cars to be used as safety cars for the FIA World Endurance Championship.

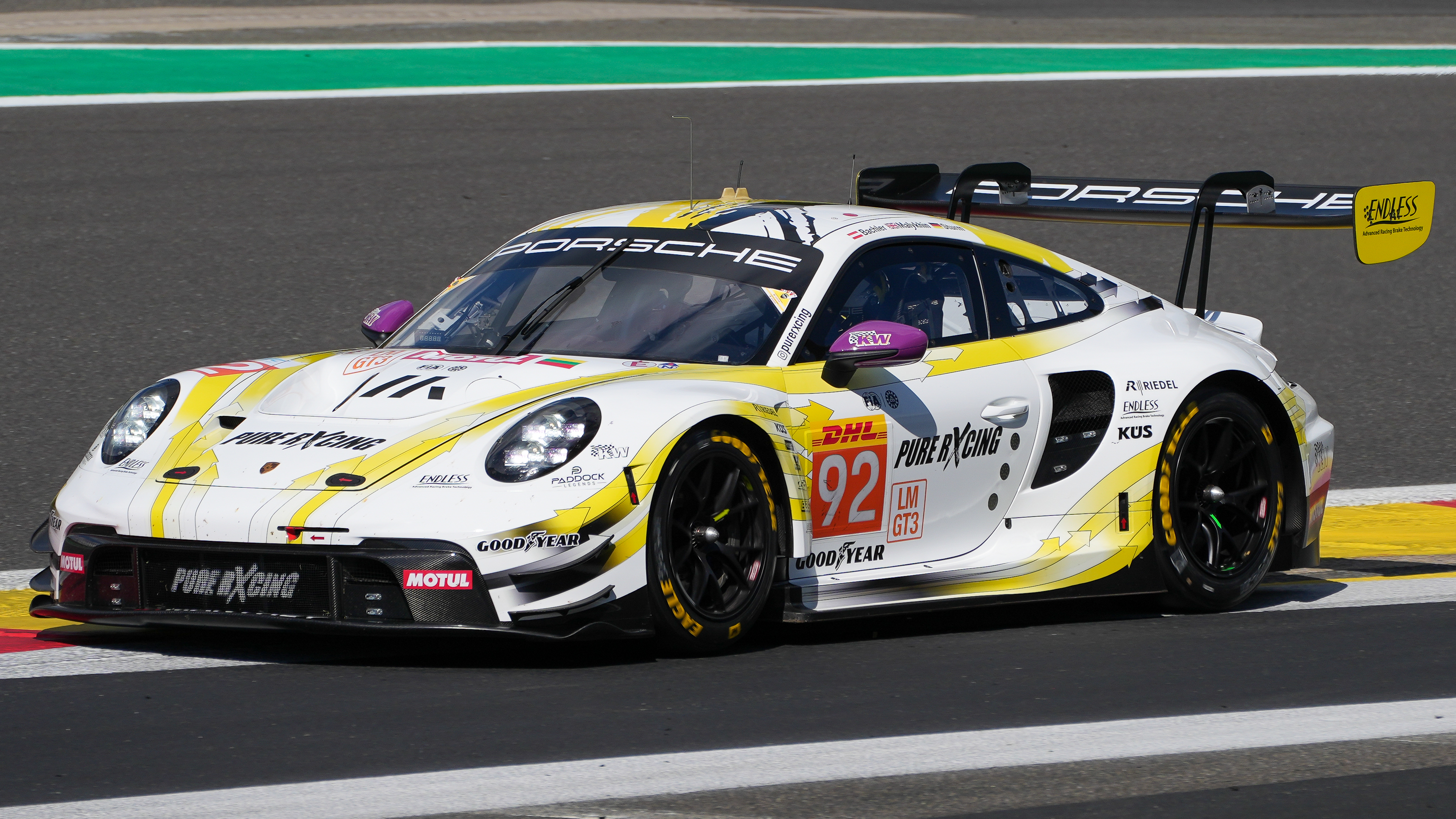
Manthey's 2024 FIA WEC title-winning Porsche 992 GT3 R at Spa-Francorchamps.

With the series transitioning to Group GT3 ahead of the 2024 FIA World Endurance Championship following the retirement of the LM GTE class, Manthey Racing was selected once again by Porsche to help operate its LMGT3 team. The team's name returned to the entry lists that season and participated with cars #91 with EMA Motorsport driven by Lietz, Yasser Shahin, and Morris Schuring, and #92 with PureRxcing driven by Klaus Bachler, Alex Malykhin, and Joel Sturm. Both entries took home two wins each, including a class win at the 2024 24 Hours of Le Mans with the #91 car. With a round to spare, the #92 car clinched the drivers' and teams' titles at the 2024 6 Hours of Fuji, and the #91 car's 5th-place finish in the following race at the 2024 8 Hours of Bahrain secured the team and Porsche a 1-2 in the LMGT3 teams' standings.

Weeks after the conclusion of the season, Manthey Racing announced that they would be campaigning the 2025 FIA World Endurance Championship with cars backed by 1st Phorm and Iron Dames respectively. Iron Dames, alongside Iron Lynx, had previously used Porsche machinery in the series in 2023 to varying levels of success before switching to the Lamborghini Huracán GT3 EVO2 in 2024. Among the lineups, Lietz was retained for another season, racing alongside Riccardo Pera and Ryan Hardwick in car #92. Rahel Frey, Michelle Gatting, and Célia Martin were set to drive the sister #85 car. Heading into the 2025 24 Hours of Le Mans, Manthey were granted a third entry after they had secured the 2024–25 Asian Le Mans Series championship with Bachler, Sturm, and Antares Au earlier that year. The ALMS title-winning third car was used as part of a promotional campaign for the F1 film starring Brad Pitt, wearing the livery of the fictional Chip Hart Racing team from the film. Manthey secured back-to-back Le Mans wins and championships each with the #92 crew.

== Auto tuning ==
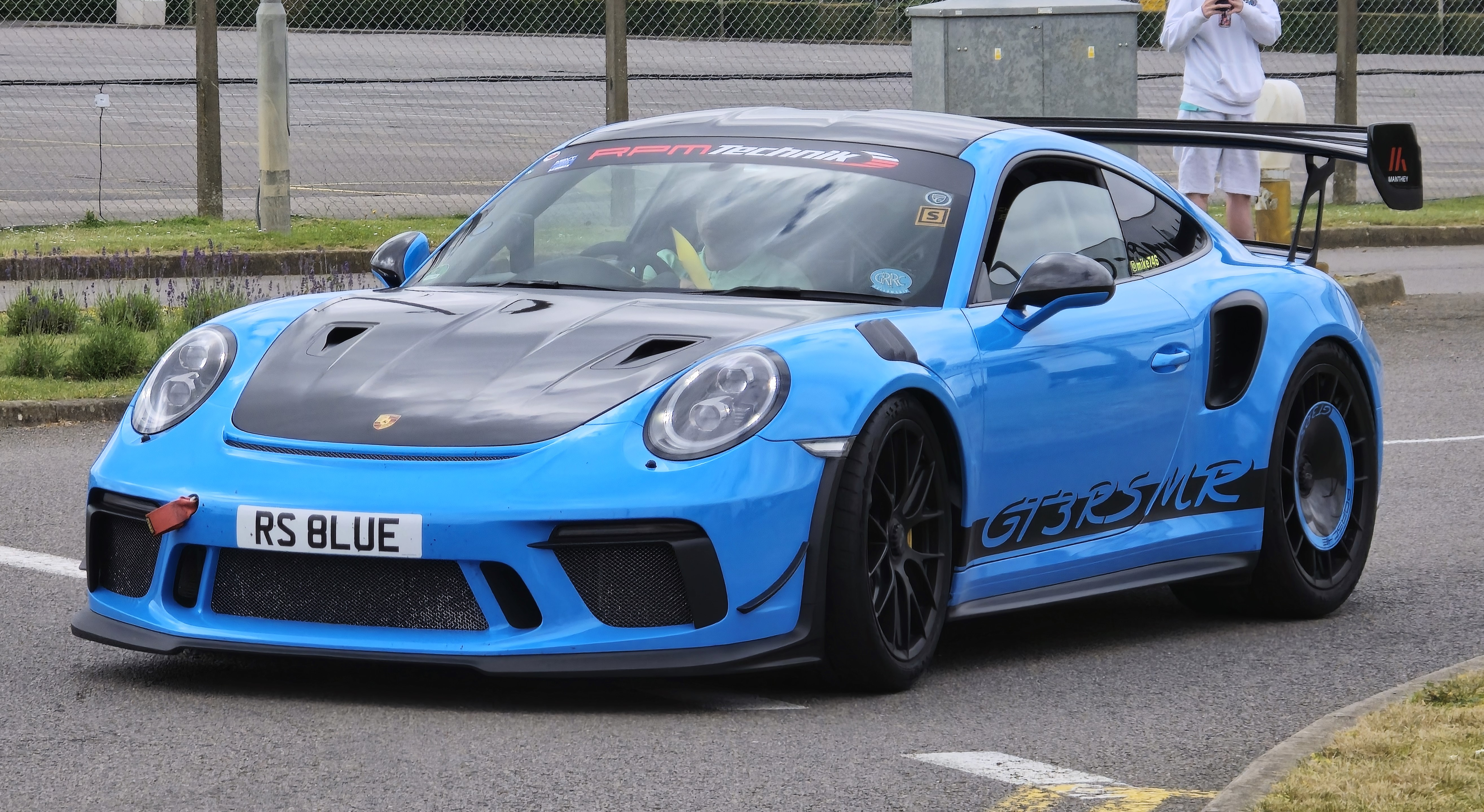
A Porsche 991.2 GT3 RS MR at the 2024 SCD Secret Meet.

Alongside their motor racing ventures, Manthey also operates a specialized tuning department that focuses on enhancing the performance and handling characteristics of Porsche road cars, particularly on the 911 and Cayman models. The department works closely with Porsche, and many of its products and upgrades are developed in cooperation with the manufacturer, often carrying Porsche-approved OEM status.

Sports cars tuned by Manthey typically carry an 'MR' suffix, which stands for 'Manthey Racing'.

Porsche have previously conducted official lap record attempts at the Nürburgring Nordschleife with Manthey packages. In 2021, Porsche development driver Lars Kern set the production car lap record at the Nordschleife, setting a time of 6:43.300 with a Porsche 911 GT2 RS with a 'Manthey Performance Kit' installed. The production car record was held for three years until Mercedes-AMG beat the lap time in 2024 with their One sports car.

== Race results ==
=== Deutsche Tourenwagen Masters ===
Year	Car	Drivers	Races	Wins	Poles	F/Laps	Podiums	Points	D.C.	T.C.
1992	Mercedes 190E 2.5-16 Evo2	(Germany) Olaf Manthey	4	0	0	0	0	0	NC	NC
2001	AMG-Mercedes CLK-DTM 2001	(Netherlands) Patrick Huisman	20	1	0	1	3	63	6th	3rd
2001	AMG-Mercedes CLK-DTM 2001	(Germany) Bernd Mayländer	13	1	0	1	2	28	11th	3rd
2001	AMG-Mercedes CLK-DTM 2001	(Germany) Marcel Tiemann	6	0	0	0	2	26	12th	3rd
2002	AMG-Mercedes CLK-DTM 2001	(Netherlands) Patrick Huisman	20	0	0	0	0	0	16th	10th
2002	AMG-Mercedes CLK-DTM 2001	(Germany) Bernd Mayländer	18	0	0	0	0	0	19th	10th
2002	AMG-Mercedes CLK-DTM 2001	(Germany) Marcel Tiemann	2	0	0	0	0	0	25th	10th
2023	Porsche 911 GT3 R (992)	(Austria) Thomas Preining	16	3	3	2	8	246	1st	1st
2023	Porsche 911 GT3 R (992)	(Norway) Dennis Olsen	16	0	0	0	2	129	7th	1st
2024	Porsche 911 GT3 R (992)	(Austria) Thomas Preining	16	1	1	1	3	158	5th	6th
2024	Porsche 911 GT3 R (992)	(Turkey) Ayhancan Güven	16	0	0	1	1	69	16th	6th
2025	Porsche 911 GT3 R (992)	(Turkey) Ayhancan Güven	16	5	0	2	5	192	1st	1st
2025	Porsche 911 GT3 R (992)	(Austria) Thomas Preining	16	2	0	4	5	182	4th	1st
2025	Porsche 911 GT3 R (992)	(Netherlands) Morris Schuring	16	1	0	0	1	58	16th	1st
2026	Porsche 911 GT3 R (992.2)	(Austria) Thomas Preining	16	2	2	1	8	225	1st	1st
2026	Porsche 911 GT3 R (992.2)	(Switzerland) Ricardo Feller	16	0	0	1	3	121	9th	1st

=== Bathurst 12 Hour ===
Year	Entrant	No.	Car	Drivers	Class	Laps	Pos.	Class Pos.
2023	(Germany) Manthey EMA Motorsport	912	Porsche 911 GT3 R (991.2)	(Australia) Matt Campbell (France) Mathieu Jaminet (Austria) Thomas Preining	Pro	323	2nd	2nd
2024	(Australia) The Bend Manthey EMA	911	Porsche 911 GT3 R (991.2)	(United Kingdom) Harry King (Belgium) Alessio Picariello (Australia) Yasser Shahin	Pro-Am	274	9th	1st
2024	(Germany) Manthey EMA Motorsport	912	Porsche 911 GT3 R (992)	(Australia) Matt Campbell (Turkey) Ayhancan Güven (Belgium) Laurens Vanthoor	Pro	275	1st	1st
2025	(Australia) The Bend Manthey EMA	91	Porsche 911 GT3 R (992)	(Germany) Laurin Heinrich (Netherlands) Morris Schuring (Australia) Sam Shahin (Australia) Yasser Shahin	Pro-Am	303	10th	2nd

=== 12 Hours of Sebring ===
Year	Entrant	No.	Car	Drivers	Class	Laps	Pos.	Class Pos.
2026	(Germany) Manthey	911	Porsche 911 GT3 R (992.2)	(Austria) Klaus Bachler (Switzerland) Ricardo Feller (Austria) Thomas Preining	GTD Pro	321	22nd	1st
2026	(Germany) Manthey 1st Phorm	912	Porsche 911 GT3 R (992.2)	(United States) Ryan Hardwick (Italy) Riccardo Pera (Netherlands) Morris Schuring	GTD	302	Ret	Ret

=== 24 Hours of Daytona ===
Year	Entrant	No.	Car	Drivers	Class	Laps	Pos.	Class Pos.
2017	(Germany) Manthey Racing	59	Porsche 911 GT3 R (991)	(Italy) Matteo Cairoli (Germany) Sven Müller (Austria) Harald Proczyk (Germany) Reinhold Renger (Switzerland) Steve Smith	GTD	61	Ret	Ret
2018	(Germany) Manthey Racing	59	Porsche 911 GT3 R (991)	(Italy) Matteo Cairoli (Germany) Sven Müller (Austria) Harald Proczyk (Germany) Steve Smith (Germany) Randy Walls	GTD	637	Ret	Ret
2026	(Germany) Manthey Racing	911	Porsche 911 GT3 R (992.2)	(Austria) Klaus Bachler (Switzerland) Ricardo Feller (Turkey) Ayhancan Güven (Austria) Thomas Preining	GTD Pro	662	23rd	5th
2026	(Germany) Manthey 1st Phorm	912	Porsche 911 GT3 R (992.2)	(United States) Ryan Hardwick (Austria) Richard Lietz (Italy) Riccardo Pera (Netherlands) Morris Schuring	GTD	660	40th	12th

=== 24 Hours of Spa ===
Year	Entrant	No.	Car	Drivers	Class	Laps	Pos.	Class Pos.
2006	(Germany) Manthey Racing (Germany) Porsche AG	197	Porsche 911 GT3 RSR (997)	(Germany) Lucas Luhr (Germany) Sascha Maassen (Germany) Marcel Tiemann	G2	518	14th	1st
2006	(Germany) Manthey Racing (Germany) Porsche AG	111	Porsche 911 GT3 RSR (997)	(Germany) Timo Bernhard (Germany) Marc Lieb (Portugal) Pedro Lamy	G2	512	15th	2nd
2011	(Germany) Haribo Team Manthey	888	Porsche 911 GT3 R (997)	(United Kingdom) Richard Westbrook (Germany) Christian Menzel (Germany) Mike Stursberg (Germany) Hans Guido Riegel	Pro-Am	485	Ret	Ret
2013	(Germany) Manthey Racing	150	Porsche 911 GT3 R (997)	(Germany) Marc Lieb (Austria) Richard Lietz (France) Patrick Pilet	Pro	563	2nd	2nd
2014	(Germany) Wochenspiegel Team Manthey	150	Porsche 911 GT3 R (997)	(Germany) Georg Weiss (Germany) Oliver Kainz (Germany) Jochen Krumbach (Germany) Christian Menzel	Pro-Am	13	Ret	Ret
2018	(Germany) Manthey Racing	911	Porsche 911 GT3 R (991)	(France) Romain Dumas (France) Frédéric Makowiecki (Germany) Dirk Werner	Pro	493	29th	19th
2023	(Germany) Manthey EMA	92	Porsche 911 GT3 R (992)	(France) Julien Andlauer (France) Kévin Estre (Belgium) Laurens Vanthoor	Pro	537	4th	4th

=== 24 Hours of Le Mans ===
Year	Entrant	No.	Car	Drivers	Class	Laps	Pos.	Class Pos.
1999	(Germany) Manthey Racing GmbH	81	Porsche 911 GT3 R (996)	(Germany) Uwe Alzen (Netherlands) Patrick Huisman (Italy) Luca Riccitelli	LMGT	317	13th	1st
2000	(Germany) Manthey Racing	75	Porsche 911 GT3 R (996)	(United States) Michael Brockman (United States) Gunnar Jeannette (United States) Mike Lauer	LMGT	261	27th	6th
2013	(Germany) Porsche AG Team Manthey	91	Porsche 911 RSR	(Germany) Jörg Bergmeister (Germany) Timo Bernhard (France) Patrick Pilet	LMGTE Pro	315	16th	2nd
2013	(Germany) Porsche AG Team Manthey	92	Porsche 911 RSR	(France) Romain Dumas (Germany) Marc Lieb (Austria) Richard Lietz	LMGTE Pro	315	15th	1st
2014	(Germany) Porsche Team Manthey	91	Porsche 911 RSR	(Germany) Jörg Bergmeister (France) Patrick Pilet (United Kingdom) Nick Tandy	LMGTE Pro	309	36th	7th
2014	(Germany) Porsche Team Manthey	92	Porsche 911 RSR	(Germany) Marco Holzer (Austria) Richard Lietz (France) Frédéric Makowiecki	LMGTE Pro	337	17th	3rd
2015	(Germany) Porsche Team Manthey	91	Porsche 911 RSR	(Germany) Jörg Bergmeister (Denmark) Michael Christensen (Austria) Richard Lietz	LMGTE Pro	327	30th	5th
2015	(Germany) Porsche Team Manthey	92	Porsche 911 RSR	(Germany) Wolf Henzler (France) Frédéric Makowiecki (France) Patrick Pilet	LMGTE Pro	14	Ret	Ret
2016	(Germany) Porsche Motorsport	91	Porsche 911 RSR	(France) Kévin Estre (France) Patrick Pilet (United Kingdom) Nick Tandy	LMGTE Pro	135	Ret	Ret
2016	(Germany) Porsche Motorsport	92	Porsche 911 RSR	(New Zealand) Earl Bamber (Germany) Jörg Bergmeister (France) Frédéric Makowiecki	LMGTE Pro	140	Ret	Ret
2017	(Germany) Porsche GT Team	91	Porsche 911 RSR	(Austria) Richard Lietz (France) Frédéric Makowiecki (France) Patrick Pilet	LMGTE Pro	339	20th	4th
2017	(Germany) Porsche GT Team	92	Porsche 911 RSR	(Denmark) Michael Christensen (France) Kévin Estre (Germany) Dirk Werner	LMGTE Pro	179	Ret	Ret
2018	(Germany) Porsche GT Team	91	Porsche 911 RSR	(Italy) Gianmaria Bruni (Austria) Richard Lietz (France) Frédéric Makowiecki	LMGTE Pro	343	16th	2nd
2018	(Germany) Porsche GT Team	92	Porsche 911 RSR	(Denmark) Michael Christensen (France) Kévin Estre (Belgium) Laurens Vanthoor	LMGTE Pro	344	15th	1st
2019	(Germany) Porsche GT Team	91	Porsche 911 RSR	(Italy) Gianmaria Bruni (Austria) Richard Lietz (France) Frédéric Makowiecki	LMGTE Pro	342	21st	2nd
2019	(Germany) Porsche GT Team	92	Porsche 911 RSR	(Denmark) Michael Christensen (France) Kévin Estre (Belgium) Laurens Vanthoor	LMGTE Pro	337	29th	9th
2020	(Germany) Porsche GT Team	91	Porsche 911 RSR-19	(Italy) Gianmaria Bruni (Austria) Richard Lietz (France) Frédéric Makowiecki	LMGTE Pro	335	31st	5th
2020	(Germany) Porsche GT Team	92	Porsche 911 RSR-19	(Denmark) Michael Christensen (France) Kévin Estre (Belgium) Laurens Vanthoor	LMGTE Pro	331	35th	6th
2021	(Germany) Porsche GT Team	91	Porsche 911 RSR-19	(Italy) Gianmaria Bruni (Austria) Richard Lietz (France) Frédéric Makowiecki	LMGTE Pro	343	23rd	4th
2021	(Germany) Porsche GT Team	92	Porsche 911 RSR-19	(Denmark) Michael Christensen (France) Kévin Estre (Switzerland) Neel Jani	LMGTE Pro	344	22nd	3rd
2022	(Germany) Porsche GT Team	91	Porsche 911 RSR-19	(Italy) Gianmaria Bruni (Austria) Richard Lietz (France) Frédéric Makowiecki	LMGTE Pro	350	28th	1st
2022	(Germany) Porsche GT Team	92	Porsche 911 RSR-19	(Denmark) Michael Christensen (France) Kévin Estre (Belgium) Laurens Vanthoor	LMGTE Pro	348	31st	4th
2024	(Germany) Manthey EMA	91	Porsche 911 GT3 R (992)	(Austria) Richard Lietz (Netherlands) Morris Schuring (Australia) Yasser Shahin	LMGT3	281	27th	1st
2024	(Lithuania) Manthey PureRxcing	92	Porsche 911 GT3 R (992)	(Austria) Klaus Bachler (Saint Kitts and Nevis) Alex Malykhin (Germany) Joel Sturm	LMGT3	273	41st	14th
2025	(Italy) Iron Dames	85	Porsche 911 GT3 R (992)	(Belgium) Sarah Bovy (Switzerland) Rahel Frey (France) Célia Martin	LMGT3	334	48th	16th
2025	(Germany) Manthey	90	Porsche 911 GT3 R (992)	(Hong Kong) Antares Au (Austria) Klaus Bachler (Netherlands) Loek Hartog	LMGT3	340	38th	6th
2025	(Germany) Manthey 1st Phorm	92	Porsche 911 GT3 R (992)	(United States) Ryan Hardwick (Austria) Richard Lietz (Italy) Riccardo Pera	LMGT3	341	33rd	1st
2026	(Germany) Manthey DK Engineering	91	Porsche 911 GT3 R (992.2)	Timur Boguslavskiy (United Kingdom) James Cottingham (Turkey) Ayhancan Güven	LMGT3	254	DNF	DNF
2026	(Germany) The Bend Manthey	92	Porsche 911 GT3 R (992.2)	(Austria) Richard Lietz (Italy) Riccardo Pera (Australia) Yasser Shahin	LMGT3	330	45th	13th

=== 24 Hours of Nürburgring ===
Year	Entrant	No.	Car	Drivers	Class	Laps	Pos.	Class Pos.
2006	(Germany) Manthey Racing	28	Porsche 911 GT3-MR (996)	(Germany) Timo Bernhard (Germany) Lucas Luhr (Germany) Mike Rockenfeller (Germany) Marcel Tiemann	SP7	151	1st	1st
2007	(Germany) Manthey Racing	1	Porsche 911 GT3 RSR (997)	(Germany) Timo Bernhard (France) Romain Dumas (Germany) Marc Lieb (Germany) Marcel Tiemann	SP7	112	1st	1st
2008	(Germany) Manthey Racing	1	Porsche 911 GT3 RSR (997)	(Germany) Timo Bernhard (France) Romain Dumas (Germany) Marc Lieb (Germany) Marcel Tiemann	SP7	148	1st	1st
2008	(Germany) Manthey Racing	23	Porsche 911 GT3-MR (996)	(Germany) Pierre Kaffer (Germany) Armin Hahne (Germany) Christian Haarmann (Germany) Jochen Krumbach	SP7	147	2nd	2nd
2008	(Germany) Manthey Racing	25	Porsche 911 GT3 Cup (997)	(Germany) Lance David Arnold (Belgium) Jean-François Hemroulle (Belgium) Bert Lambrecht	SP7	141	8th	7th
2008	(Germany) Manthey Racing	26	Porsche 911 GT3 (997)	(Germany) Frank Kräling (Germany) Marc Gindorf (Germany) Peter Scharmach (Austria) Martin Gagginger	SP7	144	5th	4th
2008	(Germany) Manthey Racing	27	Porsche 911 GT3 Cup (997)	(Germany) Gary Williams (United Kingdom) Daniel Cooke (United Kingdom) Julian Perry (United Kingdom) Trevor Reeves	SP7	137	12th	10th
2009	(Germany) Manthey Racing	1	Porsche 911 GT3 RSR (997)	(Germany) Timo Bernhard (France) Romain Dumas (Germany) Marc Lieb (Germany) Marcel Tiemann	SP7	155	1st	1st
2009	(Germany) Manthey Racing	2	Porsche 911 GT3 Cup S (997)	(France) Emmanuel Collard (Germany) Wolf Henzler (Austria) Richard Lietz (Germany) Dirk Werner	SP9 GT3	152	3rd	2nd
2009	(Germany) Manthey Racing	4	Porsche 911 GT3 (997)	(Germany) Frank Kräling (Germany) Marc Gindorf (New Zealand) Peter Scharmach (Germany) Marco Holzer	SP9 GT3	149	7th	5th
2010	(Germany) Manthey Racing	1	Porsche 911 GT3 R (997)	(Germany) Timo Bernhard (France) Romain Dumas (Germany) Marc Lieb (Germany) Marcel Tiemann	SP9 GT3		Ret	Ret
2010	(Germany) Manthey Racing	3	Porsche 911 GT3 R (997)	(Germany) Oliver Kainz (Germany) Georg Weiss (United States) Michael Jacobs (Germany) Peter-Paul Pietsch	SP9 GT3		Ret	Ret
2010	(Germany) Manthey Racing	8	Porsche 911 GT3 R (997)	(Greece) Alexandros Margaritis (Germany) Lance David Arnold (Germany) Christian Menzel (United Kingdom) Richard Westbrook	SP9 GT3		Ret	Ret
2010	(Germany) Manthey Racing	9	Porsche 911 GT3 R Hybrid (997)	(Germany) Jörg Bergmeister (Austria) Richard Lietz (Germany) Marco Holzer (Germany) Martin Ragginger	E1-XP		Ret	Ret
2010	(Germany) Manthey Racing	88	Porsche 911 GT3 Cup S (997)	(Germany) Georg Berlandy (Germany) Wolfgang Köhler (Germany) Mike Stursberg (Germany) Hans-Guido Riegel	SP9 GT3			10th
2011	(Germany) Haribo Team Manthey	8	Porsche 911 GT3 R (997)	(Germany) Mike Stursberg (Germany) Hans-Guido Riegel (Germany) Christian Menzel (United Kingdom) Richard Westbrook	SP9 GT3	149	13th	9th
2011	(Germany) Porsche Team Manthey	9	Porsche 911 GT3 R Hybrid (997)	(Germany) Jörg Bergmeister (Austria) Richard Lietz (Germany) Marco Holzer (United States) Patrick Long	E1-XP Hybrid	139	27th	1st
2011	(Germany) Wochenspiegel Team Manthey	12	Porsche 911 GT3-MR (997)	(Germany) Oliver Kainz (Germany) Georg Weiss (United States) Michael Jacobs (Germany) Jochen Krumbach	SP7	151	10th	2nd
2011	(Germany) Manthey Racing	10	Porsche 911 GT3 R (997)	(Germany) Wolfgang Kohler (Germany) Marc Gindorf (New Zealand) Peter Scharmach (Germany) Philipp Wlazik	SP9 GT3	142	22nd	14th
2011	(Germany) Manthey Racing	18	Porsche 911 GT3 RSR (997)	(Germany) Timo Bernhard (France) Romain Dumas (Germany) Marc Lieb (Germany) Lucas Luhr	SP7	156	1st	1st
2011	(Germany) Manthey Racing	19	Porsche 911 GT3 Cup (997)	(Germany) Rainer Holte (Germany) H.-P. Lieb (Germany) Arne Hoffmeister (United Kingdom) Daniel Cooke	SP7	51	Ret	Ret
2013	(Germany) Wochenspiegel Team Manthey	12	Porsche 911 GT3 RSR (997)	(Germany) Oliver Kainz (Germany) Georg Weiss (United States) Michael Jacobs (Germany) Jochen Krumbach	SP7	84	13th	2nd
2013	(Germany) Manthey Racing	18	Porsche 911 GT3 RSR (997)	(Germany) Timo Bernhard (France) Romain Dumas (Germany) Marc Lieb (Germany) Lucas Luhr	SP7	86	7th	1st
2013	(Germany) Manthey Racing	28	Porsche 911 GT3 R (997)	(Germany) Otto Klohs (Germany) Jens Richter (Germany) Marco Schelp (Germany) Harald Schlotter	SP9	73	62nd	20th
2013	(Germany) Manthey Racing	50	Porsche 911 GT3 R (997)	(Germany) Jörg Bergmeister (Germany) Marco Holzer (Austria) Richard Lietz (United Kingdom) Nick Tandy	SP9	85	11th	10th
2013	(Germany) Pinta Team Manthey	40	Porsche 911 GT3 R (997)	(Austria) Klaus Bachler (Denmark) Michael Christensen (Germany) Michael Illbruck (Germany) Robert Renauer	SP9	75	DNF	DNF
2014	(Germany) Wochenspiegel Team Manthey	11	Porsche 911 GT3 RSR (997)	(Germany) Oliver Kainz (Germany) Georg Weiss (United States) Michael Jacobs (Germany) Jochen Krumbach	SP-Pro	92	Ret	Ret
2014	(Germany) Manthey Racing	12	Porsche 911 GT3 R (997)	(Germany) Otto Klohs (Switzerland) Philipp Frommenwiler (Germany) Harald Schlotter (Germany) Jens Richter	SP9 GT3	138	35th	15th
2014	(Germany) Manthey Racing	40	Porsche 911 GT3 Cup (997)	(Switzerland) Steve Smith (Germany) Nils Reimer (Germany) Reinhold Renger (Switzerland) Harald Proczyk	SP7	146	16th	3rd
2014	(Germany) Manthey Racing	41	Porsche 911 GT3 Cup S (997)	(Germany) Marco Schelp (Monaco) Marc Gindorf (New Zealand) Peter Scharmach (Germany) Frank Kräling	SP7	48	Ret	Ret
2015	(Germany) Wochenspiegel Team Manthey	10	Porsche 911 GT3 RSR (997)	(Germany) Oliver Kainz (Germany) Georg Weiss (Denmark) Michael Christensen (Germany) Jochen Krumbach	SP-Pro	23	Ret	Ret
2015	(Germany) Manthey Racing	12	Porsche 911 GT3 R (991)	(Germany) Otto Klohs (Germany) Robert Renauer (Germany) Harald Schlotter (Germany) Jens Richter	SP9 GT3	145	17th	15th
2015	(Germany) Manthey Racing	90	Porsche 911 GT3 Cup MR (991)	(United Kingdom) Guy Smith (Germany) Nils Reimer (Germany) Reinhold Renger (Austria) Harald Proczyk	SP7	36	Ret	Ret
2015	(Germany) Manthey Racing	91	Porsche 911 GT3 Cup MR (991)	(Germany) Marco Schelp (Germany) Andreas Ziegler (New Zealand) Peter Scharmach (Germany) "Dieter Schmidtmann"	SP7	140	23rd	6th
2015	(Germany) Manthey Racing	92	Porsche 911 GT3 Cup MR (991)	(Germany) Christoph Breuer (Italy) Matteo Cairoli (Germany) Sven Müller (Germany) Mike Stursberg	SP7	44	Ret	Ret
2016	(Germany) Wochenspiegel Team Manthey	21	Porsche 911 GT3 R (991)	(Germany) Oliver Kainz (Germany) Georg Weiss (Germany) Mike Stursberg (Germany) Jochen Krumbach	SP9	128	13th	13th
2016	(Germany) Manthey Racing	12	Porsche 911 GT3 R (991)	(Germany) Otto Klohs (Germany) Robert Renauer (Germany) "Dieter Schmidtmann" (Germany) Jens Richter	SP9	123	16th	15th
2016	(Germany) Manthey Racing	59	Porsche 911 GT3 Cup MR (991)	(United Kingdom) Guy Smith (Germany) Nils Reimer (Germany) Reinhold Renger (Austria) Harald Proczyk	SP7	35	Ret	Ret
2016	(Germany) Manthey Racing	170	Porsche Cayman GT4 Clubsport (981)	(Germany) Christoph Breuer (Germany) Christian Gebhardt (Germany) Lars Kern	SP-X	121	23rd	1st
2016	(Germany) Manthey Racing	911	Porsche 911 GT3 R (991)	(United Kingdom) Nick Tandy (France) Kévin Estre (New Zealand) Earl Bamber (France) Patrick Pilet	SP9	1	Ret	Ret
2016	(Germany) Manthey Racing	912	Porsche 911 GT3 R (991)	(Germany) Jörg Bergmeister (Austria) Richard Lietz (Denmark) Michael Christensen (France) Frédéric Makowiecki	SP9	100	Ret	Ret
2017	(Germany) Manthey Racing	12	Porsche 911 GT3 R (991)	(Germany) Otto Klohs (Germany) Robert Renauer (France) Mathieu Jaminet (Italy) Matteo Cairoli	SP9	26	Ret	Ret
2017	(Germany) Manthey Racing	59	Porsche 911 GT3 R (991)	(Switzerland) Steve Smith (Germany) "Randy Walls" (Germany) Sven Müller (Switzerland) Harald Proczyk	SP9	103	Ret	Ret
2017	(Germany) Manthey Racing	66	Porsche 911 GT3 Cup MR (991)	(Germany) Stefan Aust (Germany) Christian Bollrath (Germany) Ralf Overhaus	SP7	146	22nd	1st
2017	(Germany) Manthey Racing	150	Porsche Cayman GT4 Clubsport (981)	(Germany) Christoph Breuer (Germany) Moritz Oberheim (Germany) Lars Kern (Germany) Marc Hennerici	SP-X	144	27th	2nd
2017	(Germany) Manthey Racing	911	Porsche 911 GT3 R (991)	(Austria) Richard Lietz (France) Romain Dumas (France) Frédéric Makowiecki (France) Patrick Pilet	SP9	27	Ret	Ret
2018	(Germany) Manthey Racing	12	Porsche 911 GT3 R (991)	(Germany) Lars Kern (Switzerland) Philipp Frommenwiler (Germany) Otto Klohs (Norway) Dennis Olsen	SP9	129	18th	17th
2018	(Germany) Manthey Racing	911	Porsche 911 GT3 R (991)	(Belgium) Laurens Vanthoor (France) Kévin Estre (New Zealand) Earl Bamber (France) Romain Dumas	SP9	66	Ret	Ret
2018	(Germany) Manthey Racing	912	Porsche 911 GT3 R (991)	(Austria) Richard Lietz (United Kingdom) Nick Tandy (France) Frédéric Makowiecki (France) Patrick Pilet	SP9	135	1st	1st
2019	(Germany) Manthey Racing	1	Porsche 911 GT3 R (991.2)	(Austria) Richard Lietz (United Kingdom) Nick Tandy (France) Frédéric Makowiecki (France) Patrick Pilet	SP9 Pro	61	Ret	Ret
2019	(Germany) Manthey Racing	12	Porsche 911 GT3 R (991)	(Germany) Otto Klohs (Germany) Lars Kern (Norway) Dennis Olsen (Italy) Matteo Cairoli	SP9	155	4th	4th
2019	(Germany) Manthey Racing	911	Porsche 911 GT3 R (991.2)	(Belgium) Laurens Vanthoor (France) Kévin Estre (New Zealand) Earl Bamber (Denmark) Michael Christensen	SP9 Pro	156 (Note: Manthey Racing #911 was disqualified after the car was found to have exceeded the 494 hp limit stipulated in the Balance of Performance. The car finished second prior to the disqualification.)	DSQ	DSQ
2020	(Germany) Manthey Racing	911	Porsche 911 GT3 R (991.2)	(France) Mathieu Jaminet (France) Julien Andlauer (Australia) Matt Campbell (Germany) Lars Kern	SP9	(Note: Porsche withdrew the Manthey Racing team from the event following that year's 24 Hours of Le Mans. The Manthey team ran the Porsche entry there and following concerns over COVID-19 Porsche decided not to enter. A number of drivers for other teams were affected as Porsche withdrew all members who were at Le Mans.)	WD	WD
2021	(Germany) Manthey Racing	911	Porsche 911 GT3 R (991.2)	(France) Kévin Estre (Italy) Matteo Cairoli (Denmark) Michael Christensen	SP9	59	1st	1st
2022	(Germany) Manthey Racing	911	Porsche 911 GT3 R (991.2)	(Belgium) Laurens Vanthoor (France) Kévin Estre (France) Frédéric Makowiecki (Denmark) Michael Christensen	SP9 Pro	22	Ret	Ret
2023	(Germany) Manthey EMA	911	Porsche 911 GT3 R (992)	(Denmark) Michael Christensen (France) Kévin Estre (France) Frédéric Makowiecki (Austria) Thomas Preining	SP9 Pro	62	Ret	Ret
2024	(Germany) Manthey EMA	911	Porsche 911 GT3 R (992)	(France) Kévin Estre (Turkey) Ayhancan Güven (Austria) Thomas Preining (Belgium) Laurens Vanthoor	SP9 Pro	50	2nd	2nd
2025	(Germany) Manthey Team eFuel Griesemann	718	Porsche 718 Cayman GT4 RS Clubsport M	(Germany) Björn Griesemann (Germany) Georg Griesemann	AT2	130	20th	2nd
2025	(Germany) Manthey EMA	911	Porsche 911 GT3 R (992)	(France) Kévin Estre (Turkey) Ayhancan Güven (Austria) Thomas Preining	SP9 Pro	141	2nd	2nd
2026	(Germany) Manthey Team eFuel Griesemann	992	Porsche 992 GT3 Cup MR	(Germany) Dirk Adorf (Germany) Björn Griesemann (Germany) Georg Griesemann (Germany) Marco Holzer	SP-Pro	128	55th	1st
2026	(Germany) Manthey Racing	911	Porsche 911 GT3 R (992.2)	(Australia) Matt Campbell (France) Kévin Estre (Turkey) Ayhancan Güven (Austria) Thomas Preining	SP9 Pro	24	Ret	Ret

== See also ==
- Olaf Manthey
- Porsche in motorsport

== Bibliography ==
- Thomas Voigt & Tim Upietz (12 May 2026). 30 Years Manthey – Three Decades, One Legacy, Endless Passion – 1996–2026. Gruppe C Motorsport Verlag. ISBN 978-3-948501 90-7.
