= Olaf Manthey =

German racing driver, founder of Manthey Racing (born 1955)

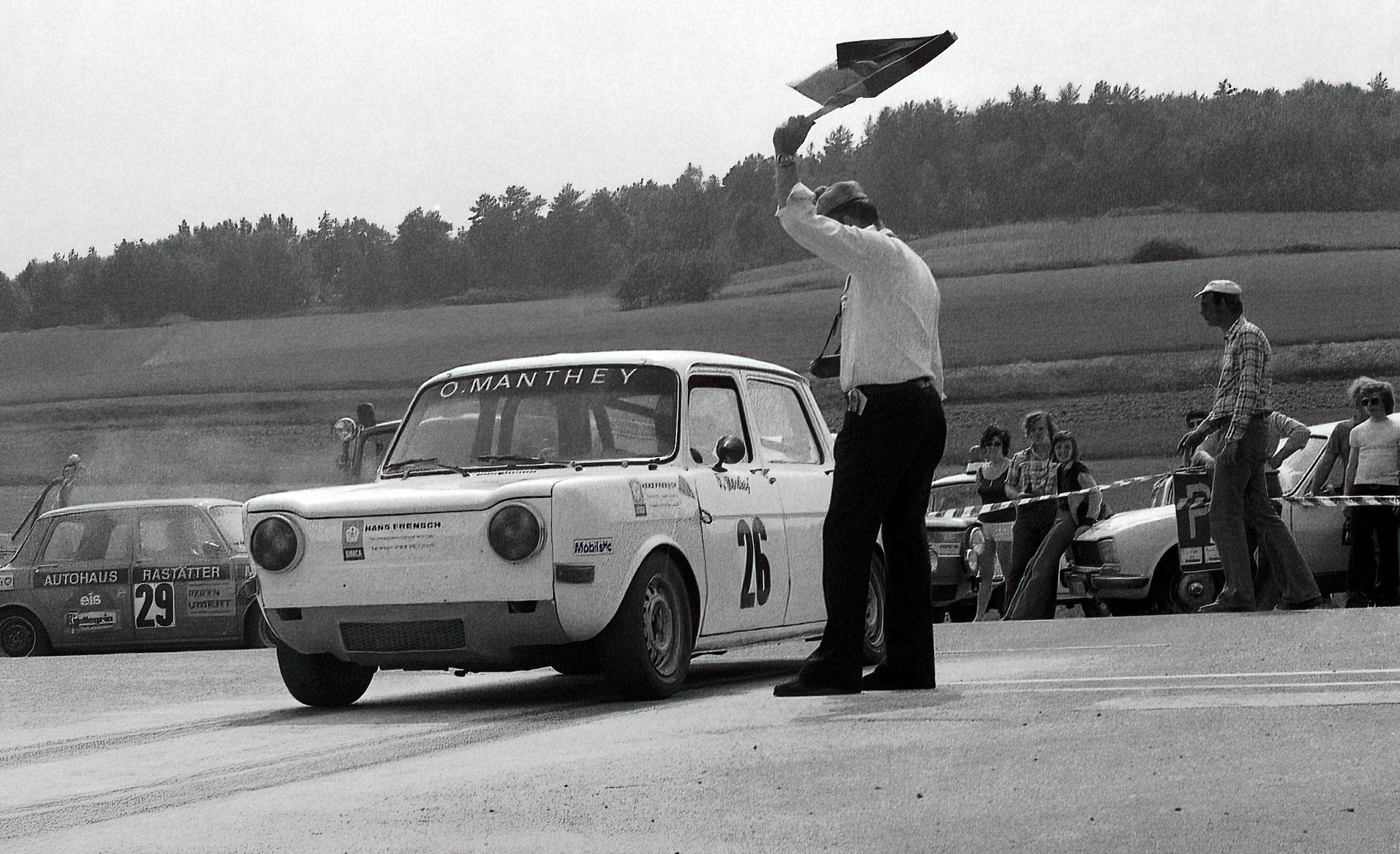
- Manthey with a Simca Rallye 2 in 1976
- Nationality: (Germany) German
- Born: 21 February 1955 (age 71) Bonn, West Germany

Championship titles
- 1990: Porsche Carrera Cup Deutschland

Olaf Manthey (German pronunciation: [ˈoːlaf ˈmantaɪ], born 21 April 1955 in Bonn) is a German former racing driver and team owner.

Primarily competing in touring cars in Germany, Manthey later founded eponymous racing team Manthey Racing in Rheinbreitbach, which also included a tuning department for Porsche road cars. As both driver and team owner, Manthey's team has accumulated numerous wins and championships, most notably accruing seven overall victories at the Nürburgring 24 Hours. He currently holds a 9% minority stake in Manthey Racing.

== Career ==
Manthey's career as a driver began in 1974. In the 1980s, he won two races of the Deutsche Tourenwagen Meisterschaft. Retiring as DTM racer after 1993, since 1994 he worked for Persson Motorsport in Deutsche Tourenwagen Meisterschaft, which ran Mercedes cars.

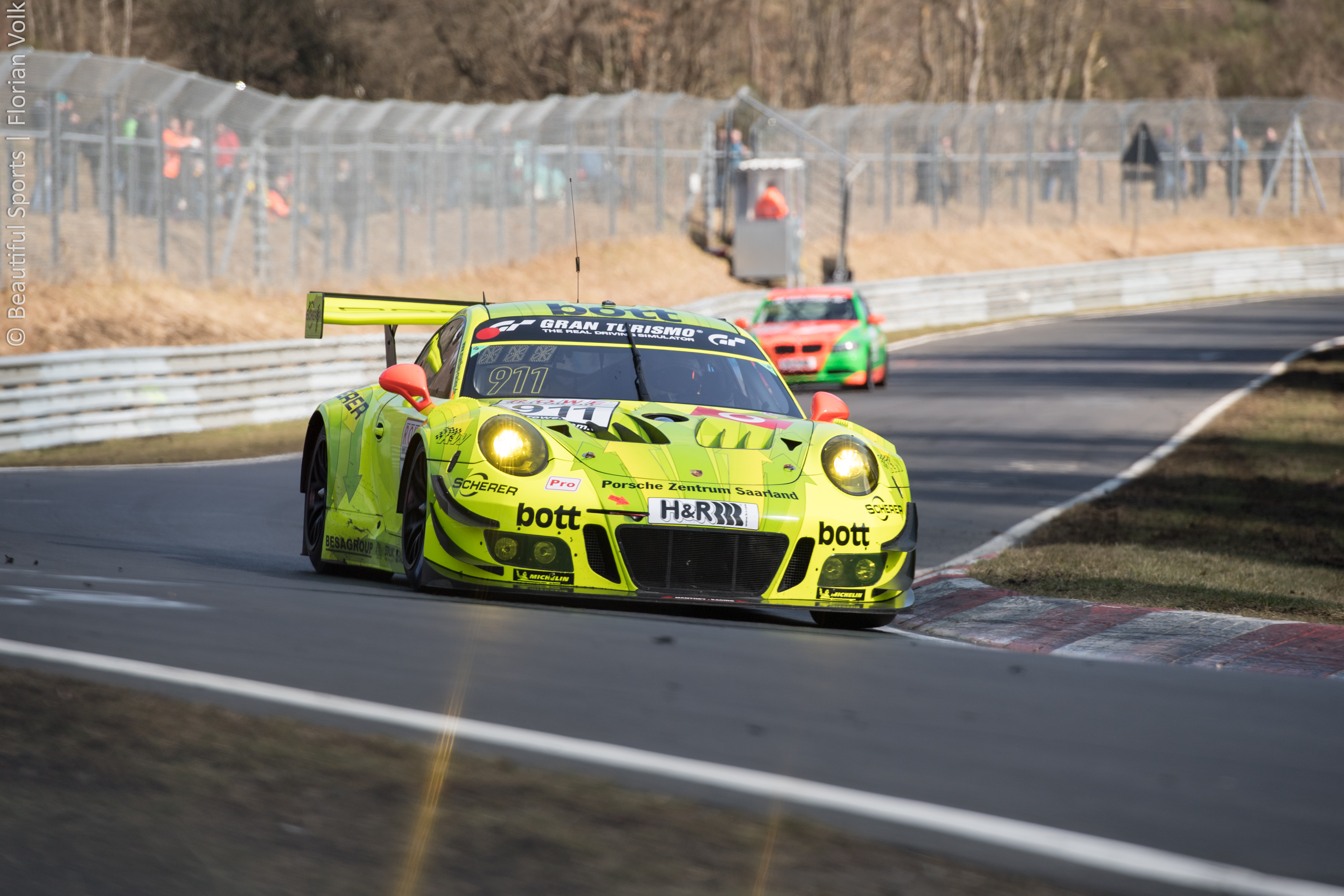
Manthey's eponymously named team has become notable for its Nürburgring ventures in Porsches, such as with this 997 GT3 R wearing their signature "Grello" livery.

After the DTM faltered in late 1996, he set up his own business near the Nürburgring, focusing on Porsche road cars and his team Manthey Racing in the German Porsche Carrera Cup, which he as driver had won in 1990, and in the Porsche Supercup. He continued racing on the long Nürburgring, mostly in the 1990s with DTM-based Mercedes 190, later with Porsche 911 GT3. Since 1999, his team receives a various degree of factory support from Porsche, or acts as factory team, or with factory-paid drivers.

In 2012, Manthey decided to leave the VLN series and enter the International GT Open instead. However, the team still ran a car at the 24 Hours of Nurburgring that year.

Manthey has taken 30 overall victories at the Nürburgring Endurance Series (formerly VLN) in his career, more than any other driver.

== Personal life ==
Manthey married his wife Renate in 1982. Together, they have two children, a son and daughter. His son died in a car accident in 2007.

== Results ==
=== Driver ===
- 1982 1st Ford Sport cup, Ford Escort RS 2000
- 1983 1st Ford Sport cup
- 1984 2nd DTM, Rover Vitesse
- 1985 2nd DTM, Rover Vitesse
- 1988 High speed record, Audi 200 Turbo
- 1990 1st Porsche Carrera Cup Deutschland, Porsche 911 Carrera
- 1992 – 1995: 22 VLN wins, Mercedes 190 EVO II

=== Team ===
- 1996 4th ranked Team in Porsche Supercup
- 1997 1st & 2nd Driver, 1st Team, Porsche Supercup
- 1998 1st & 2nd Driver, 1st Team, Porsche Supercup
- 1999 1st GT class 1999 24 Hours of Le Mans, Porsche 911 GT3-R
- 1999 1st Driver & Team, Porsche Supercup
- 2000 1st Driver & Team, Porsche Supercup
- 2001 3rd Team, DTM, Mercedes
- 2001 3rd Team Porsche Supercup
- 2002 4th Team Porsche Supercup
- 2003 3rd 24 Hours Nürburgring
- 2004 3rd 24h Nürburgring
- 2005 9th 24h Nürburgring
- 2006 1st 24h Nürburgring
- 2007 1st 24h Nürburgring
- 2008 1st, 2nd, 5th, 8th and 12th 24h Nürburgring
- 2009 1st, 3rd and 7th 24h Nürburgring
- 2011 1st, 10th and 13th 24h Nürburgring
- 2013 1st GT class 2013 24 Hours of Le Mans, Porsche 911 RSR (with factory support)

Sporting positions
Preceded by Roland Asch	Porsche Carrera Cup Germany champion 1990	Succeeded by Roland Asch
