= Lance David Arnold =

German racing driver (born 1986)

- Nationality: (Germany) German
- Born: 8 June 1986 (age 40) Duisburg (Germany)

Porsche Supercup career
- Debut season: 2005
- Categorisation: FIA Silver (until 2013, 2015–); FIA Gold (2014)
- Former teams: Porsche Junior Team; SPS Automotive; Motopark Academy
- Starts: 31
- Wins: 0
- Poles: 0
- Fastest laps: 0
- Best finish: 13th in 2009

Lance David Arnold (born 8 June 1986 in Duisburg) is a German racing driver. He has competed in such series as the Rolex Sports Car Series and Porsche Supercup, as well as the 2009 24 Hours of Nürburgring.

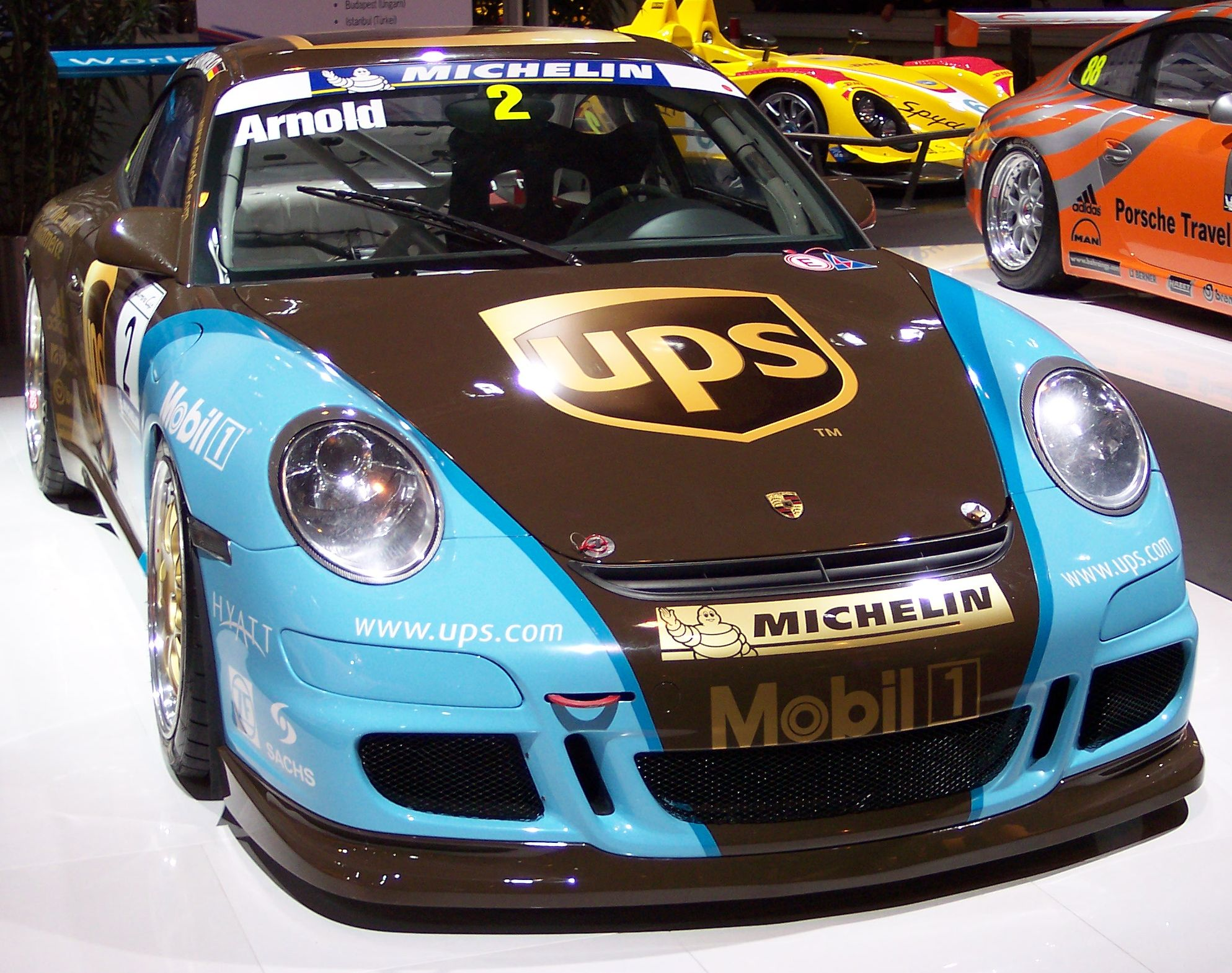
A Porsche GT3 RS of Lance David Arnold

In November 2011, Arnold partnered with 1998 and 1999 F1 World Champion Mika Häkkinen and Cheng Congfu to drive a Mercedes-Benz SLS AMG at the 2011 6 Hours of Zhuhai race, a round of the 2011 Intercontinental Le Mans Cup.

== Racing record ==
=== Complete Porsche Supercup results ===
(key) (Races in bold indicate pole position) (Races in italics indicate fastest lap)

Year	Team	Car	1	2	3	4	5	6	7	8	9	10	11	12	13	DC	Points
2005	UPS Porsche Junior Team	Porsche 997 GT3	ITA	ESP; 14	MON	GER	USA	USA	FRA	GBR; 13	GER; 4	HUN; 5	ITA; 10	BEL		NC	0‡
2006	UPS Porsche Junior Team	Porsche 997 GT3	BHR; 10	ITA	GER	ESP; 6	MON; 8	GBR; 9	USA	USA	FRA	GER; 5	HUN; 7	ITA; 9		NC	0‡
2007	UPS Porsche Junior Team	Porsche 997 GT3	BHR	BHR	ESP; 7	MON	FRA; 19	GBR; 8	GER; 15	HUN; 10	TUR	ITA; 6	BEL; 10			NC	0‡
2008	SPS Automotive	Porsche 997 GT3	BHR	BHR	ESP	TUR	MON	FRA	GBR	GER; 13	HUN; 7	ESP; 14	BEL; Ret	ITA; 7		22nd	16
2009	SPS Automotive	Porsche 997 GT3	BHR	BHR	ESP	MON	TUR	GBR; 6	GER; 9	HUN; Ret	ESP; 3	BEL; 8	ITA; 7	UAE	UAE	13th	55
2011	Motopark	Porsche 997 GT3	TUR	ESP	MON	NNS; 3	GBR	NÜR	HUN	BEL	ITA	UAE	UAE			NC	0‡

‡ Guest Driver — Ineligible for points

=== Complete 24 Hours of Nürburgring results ===
Year	Team	Co-Drivers	Car	Class	Laps	Ovr. Pos.	Class Pos.
2008	(Germany) Manthey Racing	(Belgium) Jean-François Hemroulle (Belgium) Bert Lambrecht	Porsche 911 GT3	SP7	141	8th	7th
2009	(Germany) Uwe Alzen Automotive	(Germany) Uwe Alzen (Germany) Sascha Bert (Germany) Christopher Mies	Porsche 997 GT3 Cup	SP9	150	4th	**3rd**
2011	(Germany) Heico Motorsport	(Germany) Alexandros Margaritis (Germany) Christopher Brück (Netherlands) Christiaan Frankenhout	Mercedes-Benz SLS AMG GT3	SP9	153	7th	5th
2012	(Germany) Hankook Team Heico	(Sweden) Andreas Simonsen (Germany) Pierre Kaffer (Netherlands) Christiaan Frankenhout	Mercedes-Benz SLS AMG GT3	SP9	155	**3rd**	**3rd**
2013	(Germany) Rowe Racing	(Germany) Thomas Jäger (Germany) Jan Seyffarth (Germany) Alexander Roloff	Mercedes-Benz SLS AMG GT3	SP9	87	4th	4th
2014	(Germany) Black Falcon Team Reissdorf Alkoholfrei	(Netherlands) Jeroen Bleekemolen (Sweden) Andreas Simonsen (Germany) Christian Menzel	Mercedes-Benz SLS AMG GT3	SP9 GT3	159	**2nd**	**2nd**
2015	(United Kingdom) Bentley Motors Ltd.	(Netherlands) Jeroen Bleekemolen (Germany) Christopher Brück (Germany) Christian Menzel	Bentley Continental GT3	SP9 GT3	52	DNF	DNF
2015	(United Kingdom) Bentley Motors Ltd.	(United Kingdom) Steven Kane (United Kingdom) Andy Meyrick (United Kingdom) Guy Smith	Bentley Continental GT3	SP9 GT3	119	72nd	16th
2016	(Germany) Haribo Racing Team-AMG	(Germany) Uwe Alzen (Germany) Maximilian Götz (Germany) Jan Seyffarth	Mercedes-AMG GT3	SP 9	23	DNF	DNF
2016	(Germany) Haribo Racing Team-AMG	(Germany) Uwe Alzen (Germany) Maximilian Götz (Germany) Jan Seyffarth	Mercedes-AMG GT3	SP 9	133	**3rd**	**3rd**
2017	(Germany) Haribo Racing Team Mercedes-AMG	(Netherlands) Renger van der Zande (Germany) Maximilian Götz	Mercedes-AMG GT3	SP 9	157	9th	9th
2018	(Germany) Frikadelli Racing Team	(Australia) Matt Campbell (Germany) Wolf Henzler (Germany) Alex Müller	Porsche 911 GT3 R	SP9	132	11th	10th
2019	(Germany) Mercedes-AMG Team Mann Filter	(Germany) Christian Hohenadel (Italy) Raffaele Marciello (Germany) Maximilian Götz	Mercedes-AMG GT3	SP 9	120	DNF	DNF
2020	(Germany) Frikadelli Racing Team	(France) Mathieu Jaminet (Germany) Lars Kern (Belgium) Maxime Martin	Porsche 911 GT3 R	SP 9	85	7th	7th
2021	(Germany) Falken Motorsports	(Austria) Klaus Bachler (Austria) Thomas Preining (Germany) Dirk Werner	Porsche 911 GT3 R	SP 9	59	9th	9th
2022	(Germany) Toyo Tire with TGR Ring Racing	(Germany) Tobias Vazquez-Garcia (Germany) Janis Waldow	Toyota GR Supra GT4	SP 10	79	93rd	6th
2023	(Germany) Toyo Tire with Ring Racing	(Germany) Andreas Gülden (Japan) Takayuki Kinoshita (Germany) Michael Tischner	Toyota GR Supra GT4	SP 10	146	27th	5th
2024	(Germany) Glickenhaus Racing LLC	(France) Côme Ledogar (France) Franck Mailleux (Germany) Thomas Mutsch	Glickenhaus SCG 004c	SP X Pro	41	66th	**1st**
2026	(Germany) HWA Engineering Speed	(United States) Adam Adelson (United Kingdom) Jamie Green (Netherlands) Renger van der Zande	Mercedes-Benz 190E HWA EVO.R	SP X Pro	131	47th	**2nd**

=== Complete 24 Hours of Le Mans results ===
Year	Team	Co-Drivers	Car	Class	Laps	Pos.	Class Pos.
2021	(Germany) Dempsey-Proton Racing	(France) Julien Andlauer (United States) Dominique Bastien	Porsche 911 RSR-19	GTE; Am	327	42nd	13th
