= Project 1 Motorsport =

German motorsport team

(Germany) Project 1 Motorsport
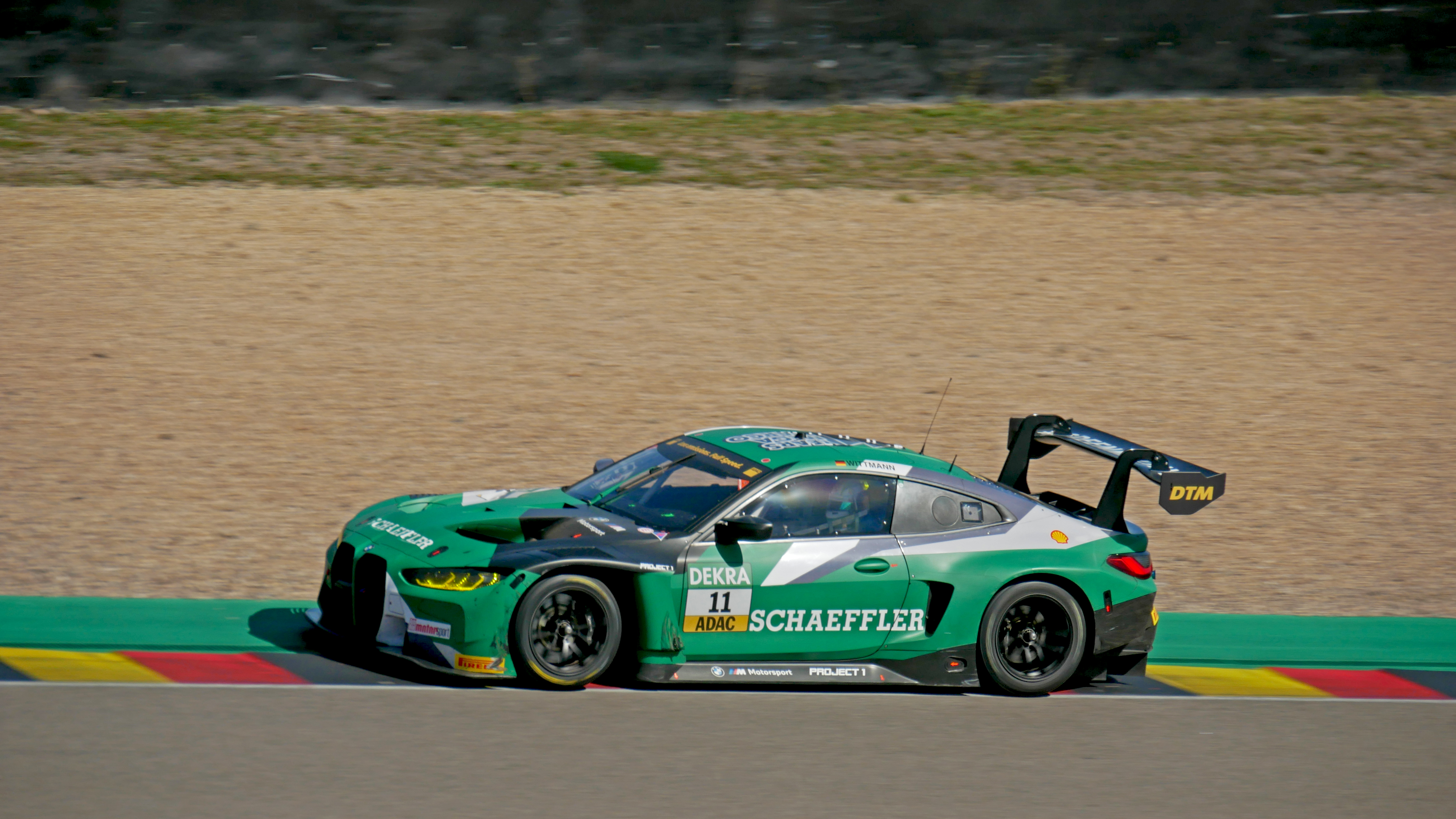
- Founded: 1993
- Founder(s): Hans-Bernd Kamps; Jörg Michaels
- Folded: 2024
- Former names: tolimit Motorsport
- Base: Lohne, Germany
- Team principal(s): Marcel Jürgens-Wichmann; Axel Funke
- Former series: 24H Series; DTM Trophy; FIA World Endurance Championship; Deutsche Tourenwagen Masters; BMW M2 Cup
- Current drivers: (Italy) Matteo Cairoli (United States) P. J. Hyett (United States) Gunnar Jeannette (Portugal) Guilherme Oliveira (Portugal) Miguel Ramos (Dominican Republic) Efrin Castro (Germany) Marco Wittmann (Germany) Sandro Holzem
- Teams' Championships: Carrera Cup Germany: 2005, 2011, 2012, 2015; FIA WEC: 2018–19 GTE-Am
- Drivers' Championships: Carrera Cup Germany: 2005: Christian Menzel; 2012: René Rast; 2014: Philipp Eng; 2015: Philipp Eng; Porsche Supercup: 2015: Philipp Eng; FIA WEC: 2018–19 GTE-Am
- Website: www.project-1.de

Project 1 Motorsport, formerly known as tolimit Motorsport, was a German auto racing team founded by Hans-Bernd Kamps and Jörg Michaels in 1993 to compete in the Porsche Carrera Cup Germany and later the Porsche Supercup. Based in Lohne, the team has won eighteen championships in the two Porsche series, and has expanded in 2018 to the FIA World Endurance Championship. The team changed their name from tolimit Motorsport to Project 1 in 2013. Deutsche Post has sponsored the team since 1998.

Former Carrera Cup Germany champions for the team include Christian Menzel, René Rast, and Philipp Eng, while Eng also won Project 1's sole Supercup title in 2015.

The team filed for bankruptcy in early 2024.

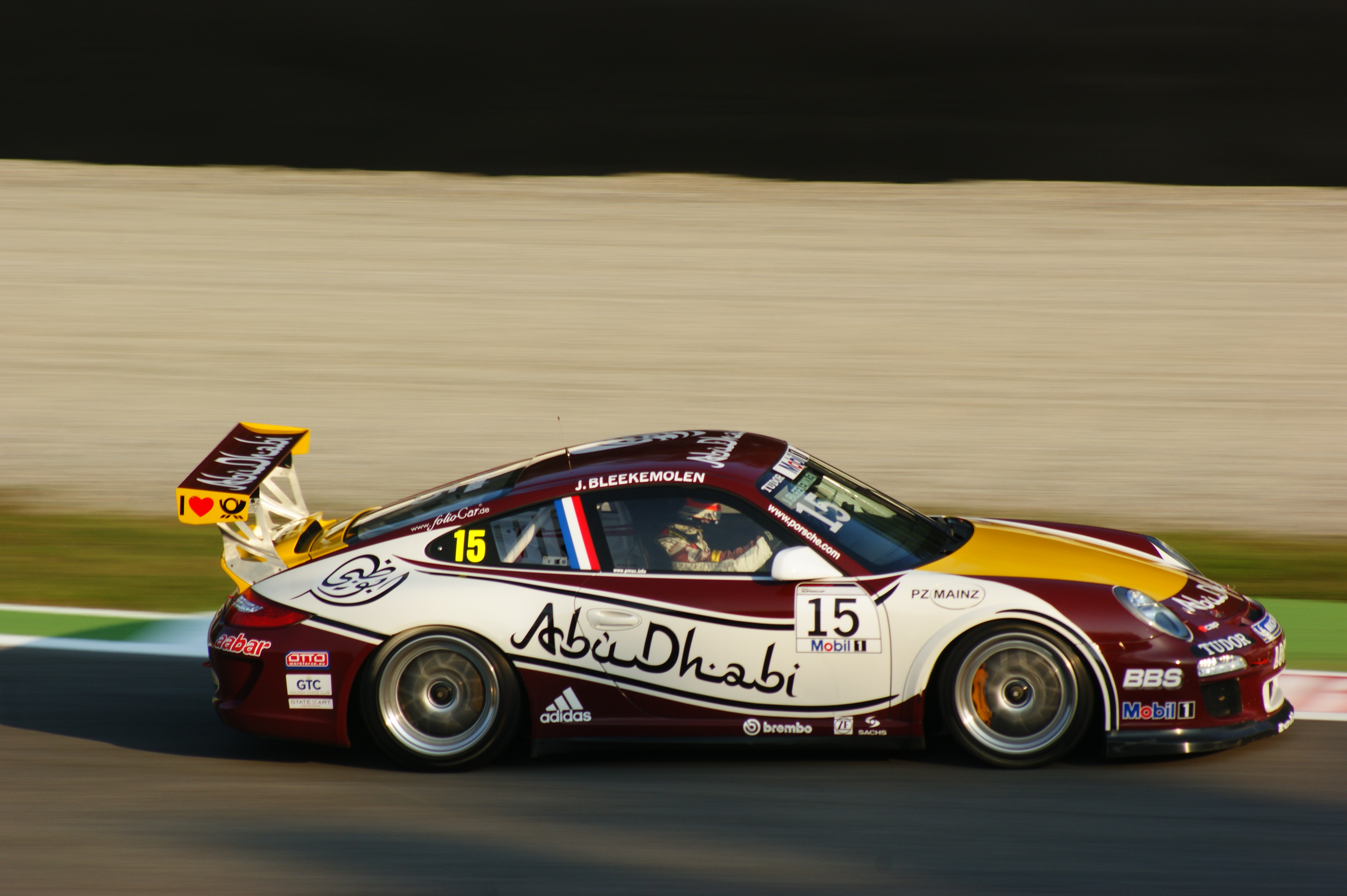
Jeroen Bleekemolen competing for tolimit Motorsport in the 2011 Porsche Supercup

== Racing record ==
=== 24 Hours of Le Mans ===
Year	Entrant	No.	Car	Drivers	Class	Laps	Pos.	Class Pos.
2018	(Germany) Team Project 1	56	Porsche 911 RSR	(Germany) Jörg Bergmeister (United States) Patrick Lindsey (Norway) Egidio Perfetti	LMGTE Am	332	34th	7th
2019	(Germany) Team Project 1	56	Porsche 911 RSR	(Germany) Jörg Bergmeister (United States) Patrick Lindsey (Norway) Egidio Perfetti	LMGTE Am	334	31st	1st
2020	(Germany) Team Project 1	56	Porsche 911 RSR	(Italy) Matteo Cairoli (Norway) Egidio Perfetti (Netherlands) Larry ten Voorde	LMGTE Am	339	27th	4th
2020	(Germany) Team Project 1	57	Porsche 911 RSR	(Netherlands) Jeroen Bleekemolen (Brazil) Felipe Fraga (United States) Ben Keating	LMGTE Am	326	40th	14th
2020	(Germany) Team Project 1	89	Porsche 911 RSR	(France) "Steve Brooks" (Greece) Andreas Laskaratos (France) Julien Piguet	LMGTE Am	313	43rd	16th
2021	(Chinese Taipei) HubAuto Racing	72	Porsche 911 RSR-19	(Belgium) Maxime Martin (Portugal) Álvaro Parente (Belgium) Dries Vanthoor	LMGTE Pro	227	DNF	DNF
2021	(Germany) Team Project 1	46	Porsche 911 RSR-19	(Norway) Anders Buchardt (United States) Robby Foley (Norway) Dennis Olsen	LMGTE Am	138	DNF	DNF
2021	(Germany) Team Project 1	56	Porsche 911 RSR-19	(Italy) Matteo Cairoli (Italy) Riccardo Pera (Norway) Egidio Perfetti	LMGTE Am	84	DNF	DNF
2022	(Germany) Team Project 1	46	Porsche 911 RSR-19	(Italy) Matteo Cairoli (Switzerland) Nicolas Leutwiler (Denmark) Mikkel O. Pedersen	LMGTE Am	77	DNF	DNF
2022	(Germany) Team Project 1	56	Porsche 911 RSR-19	(United Kingdom) Ben Barnicoat (United States) Brendan Iribe (United Kingdom) Ollie Millroy	LMGTE Am	241	DNF	DNF
2023	(Germany) Project 1 – AO	56	Porsche 911 RSR-19	(Italy) Matteo Cairoli (United States) P. J. Hyett (United States) Gunnar Jeannette	LMGTE Am	309	35th	7th

=== Deutsche Tourenwagen Masters ===
Year	Car	Drivers	Races	Wins	Poles	F/Laps	Podiums	Points	D.C.	T.C.
2023	BMW M4 GT3	(Germany) Marco Wittmann	16	0	0	1	0	91	13th	11th
2023	BMW M4 GT3	(Germany) Sandro Holzem	10	0	0	0	0	0	30th	11th

=== DTM Trophy ===
Year	Car	Drivers	Races	Wins	Poles	F/Laps	Podiums	Points	D.C.	T.C.
2022	BMW M4 GT4	(Netherlands) Colin Caresani	14	4	1	4	7	188	2nd	1st
2022	BMW M4 GT4	(Germany) Louis Henkefend	14	1	0	0	1	91	7th	1st
