= Peter Scharmach =

German-New Zealand racing driver

Peter Scharmach (born 31 May 1964 in Remscheid) is an auto racing driver who is of both German and New Zealand nationality, who lives in Christchurch.

== Career ==
Scharmach started his career in the rally sport during the 80s. During the 1990s, Scharmach raced in a number of touring car racing series in Germany and New Zealand, such as the Deutsche Tourenwagen Challenge.

Between 2000 and 2005, Scharmach competed in selected races of series such as the Renault Eurocup, Porsche Supercup and SEAT Leon Supercopa Germany. In 2005, he raced at the season-ending round of the World Touring Car Championship at Macau for Engstler Motorsport.

Scharmach finished third in the New Zealand Mini Challenge in 2006-07 and has also raced in the German equivalent. He finished fourth at the 2007 24 Hours Nürburgring. He raced in the Peugeot THP Spider Cup in 2008, and in ADAC GT Masters in 2009.

== Racing record ==
=== Complete Porsche Supercup results ===
(key) (Races in bold indicate pole position) (Races in italics indicate fastest lap)

Year	Team	1	2	3	4	5	6	7	8	9	10	11	12	DC	Points
2003	Land-Motorsport PZ Siegen	ITA	ESP	AUT	MON	GER1	FRA	GBR	GER2	HUN	ITA	USA; 12	USA; 12	NC†	0
2005	Konrad Motorsport	ITA	ESP	MON	GER	USA	USA	FRA	GBR	GER	HUN	ITA	BEL; 11	NC†	0
2010	Konrad Motorsport	BHR	BHR	ESP	MON	ESP	GBR	GER	HUN	BEL; 19	ITA			NC†	0
2011	MRS GT-Racing Lechner Racing Team	TUR	ESP	MON	GER	GBR	GER	HUN	BEL; 17	ITA	UAE	UAE		NC†	0
2015	MRS GT-Racing	ESP	MON	AUT	GBR	HUN	BEL; 30	BEL; 22	ITA	ITA	USA	USA		NC†	0
