= Dirk Werner =

German Porsche factory racing driver

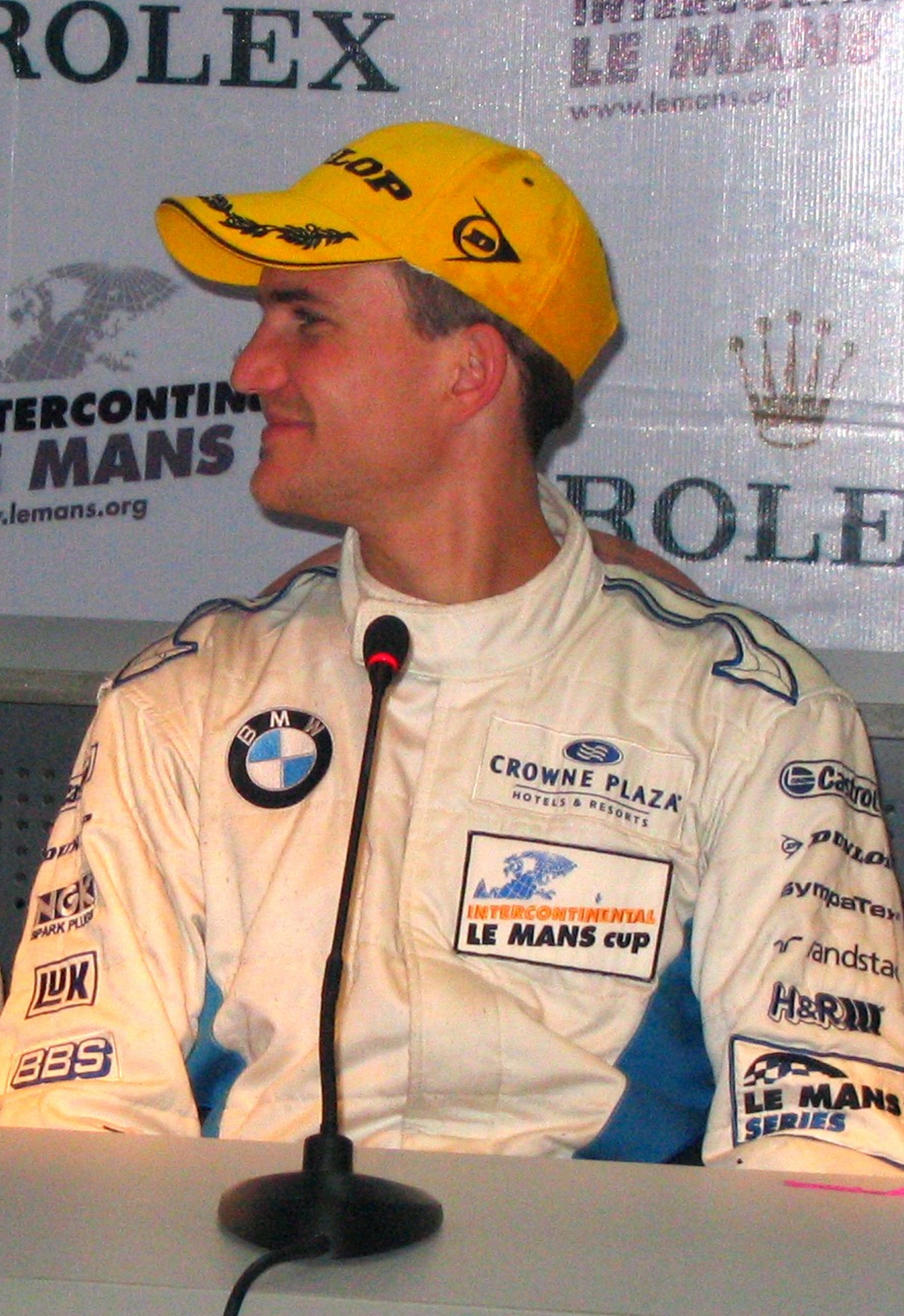
- Werner at the 1000 km of Zhuhai of the 2010 Intercontinental Le Mans Cup
- Nationality: (Germany) German
- Born: 25 May 1981 (age 45) Hannover, Lower Saxony, West Germany
- Debut season: 2004–present
- Current team: Porsche GT Team
- Categorisation: FIA Platinum
- Engine: Porsche 4.0 L Flat-6

Dirk Werner (born 25 May 1981 in Hannover, Lower Saxony) is a German racing driver.

Born in Hannover, Werner was 2007 and 2009 Grand-Am Rolex Sports Car Series champion for Farnbacher-Loles Racing driving a Porsche 911 and finished third in the GT Class in the 2011 American Le Mans Series season. Werner has scored podiums various high level endurance races, including the 24 Hours of Daytona, 24 Hours of Spa, 24 Hours of Nürburgring, 12 Hours of Sebring and Petit Le Mans.

Werner won the Porsche Cup, an annual award presented by Porsche AG to recognize the world's most successful privateer racing driver competing with Porsche machinery in a customer racing team, in 2009.

Since 2010, Werner is a BMW works driver, and has competed at the 24 Hours of Le Mans, the Le Mans Series and the Intercontinental Le Mans Cup in addition to the American Le Mans Series.

In 2012, Werner would become one of the six BMW drivers in its return to the Deutsche Tourenwagen Masters after two decades of absence.

== Racing record ==
=== Complete Porsche Supercup results ===
(key) (Races in bold indicate pole position) (Races in italics indicate fastest lap)

Year	Team	Car	1	2	3	4	5	6	7	8	9	10	11	12	DC	Points
2004	Farnbacher Racing	Porsche 996 GT3	ITA; 7	ESP; 4	MON; 3	GER; Ret	USA; 3	USA; 2	FRA; 5	GBR; 3	GER; 15	HUN; 2	BEL; 19†	ITA; 5	**3rd**	**194**
2005	MRS Racing	Porsche 997 GT3	ITA	ESP	MON	GER; 9	USA	USA	FRA	GBR					NC‡	0‡
2005	Farnbacher Racing	Porsche 997 GT3									**GER**; 18†	HUN	ITA; 5	**BEL**; 1	NC‡	0‡
2006	Farnbacher Racing	Porsche 997 GT3	BHR; 6	ITA; 6	GER	ESP	MON	GBR	USA	USA	FRA	GER	HUN	ITA	20th	10

† — Did not finish the race but was classified as he completed over 90% of the race distance.

‡ Not eligible for points

=== 24 Hours of Daytona results ===
Year	Team	Co-drivers	Car	Class	Laps	Pos.	Class Pos.
2006	(United States) Farnbacher/Loles Racing	(Austria) Dieter Quester (Austria) Philipp Peter (Italy) Luca Riccitelli	Porsche 997 GT3 Cup	GT	683	12th	**3rd**
2007	(United States) Farnbacher Loles Motorsports	(United States) Leh Keen (Germany) Pierre Ehret (Germany) Jörg Hardt	Porsche 997 GT3 Cup	GT	579	31st DNF	14th DNF
2008	(United States) Farnbacher Loles Racing	(Germany) Dominik Farnbacher (Germany) Pierre Ehret (Germany) Timo Bernhard	Porsche 997 GT3 Cup	GT	646	18th	8th
2009	(United States) Farnbacher Loles Racing	(United States) Leh Keen (Germany) Wolf Henzler (United Kingdom) Richard Westbrook	Porsche 997 GT3 Cup	GT	676	16th	8th
2012	(United States) Turner Motorsport	(United States) Bill Auberlen (Canada) Paul Dalla Lana (United States) Michael Marsal (Germany) Dirk Müller	BMW M3	GT	691	27th	16th
2014	(United States) BMW Team RLL	(United States) Graham Rahal (United States) John Edwards (Germany) Dirk Müller	BMW Z4 GTE	GTLM	668	14th	4th
2015	(United States) BMW Team RLL	(United States) Bill Auberlen (Brazil) Augusto Farfus (Canada) Bruno Spengler	BMW Z4 GTE	GTLM	725	5th	**2nd**
2016	(United States) BMW Team RLL	(United States) Bill Auberlen (Brazil) Augusto Farfus (Canada) Bruno Spengler	BMW M6 GTLM	GTLM	721	11th	5th

=== Britcar 24 Hour results ===
Year	Team	Co-Drivers	Car	Car No.	Class	Laps	Pos.	Class Pos.
2007	(Austria) Duller Motorsport	(United Kingdom) Jamie Campbell-Walter (Austria) Dieter Quester (Austria) Johannes Stuck	BMW Z4 M Coupé	1	GT3	596	**1st**	**1st**

=== 24 Hours of Le Mans results ===
Year	Team	Co-Drivers	Car	Class	Laps	Pos.	Class Pos.
2010	(Germany) BMW Motorsport	(United Kingdom) Andy Priaulx (Germany) Dirk Müller	BMW M3 GT2	GT2	53	DNF	DNF
2011	(Germany) BMW Motorsport	(Brazil) Augusto Farfus (Germany) Jörg Müller	BMW M3 GT2	GTE; Pro	276	DNF	DNF
2017	(Germany) Porsche GT Team	(Denmark) Michael Christensen (France) Kévin Estre	Porsche 911 RSR	GTE; Pro	179	DNF	DNF

=== Complete DTM results ===
(key) (Races in bold indicate pole position) (Races in italics indicate fastest lap)

Year	Team	Car	1	2	3	4	5	6	7	8	9	10	Pos	Points
2012	BMW Team Schnitzer	BMW M3 DTM	HOC; 17	LAU; 19	BRH; 16	SPL; Ret	NOR; 10	NÜR; 12	ZAN; 8	OSC; 4	VAL; 9	HOC; 5	9th	29
2013	BMW Team Schnitzer	BMW M3 DTM	HOC; 2	BRH; 12	SPL; 8	LAU; 13	NOR; 11	MSC; 8	NÜR; 15	OSC; 13	ZAN; 21†	HOC; 8	13th	30

=== Complete FIA World Endurance Championship results ===
Year	Entrant	Class	Chassis	Engine	1	2	3	4	5	6	7	8	9	Rank	Points
2017	Porsche GT Team	LMGTE Pro	Porsche 911 RSR	Porsche 4.0 L Flat-6	SIL	SPA	LMS; Ret	NÜR	MEX	COA	FUJ	SHA	BHR	NC	0

==== Complete WeatherTech SportsCar Championship results ====
(key) (Races in bold indicate pole position; results in italics indicate fastest lap)

Year	Team	Class	Make	Engine	1	2	3	4	5	6	7	8	9	10	11	12	Pos.	Points
2014	BMW Team RLL	GTLM	BMW Z4 GTE	BMW 4.4 L V8	DAY; 4	SEB; 10	LBH	LAG	WGI	MOS	IND	ROA	VIR	AUS	PET; 7		22nd	76
2015	BMW Team RLL	GTLM	BMW Z4 GTE	BMW 4.4 L V8	DAY; 2	SEB; 8	LBH; 1	**LGA**; **2**	WGL; 3	MOS; 4	ELK; 5	VIR; 5	AUS; 1	PET; 4			2nd	305
2016	BMW Team RLL	GTLM	BMW M6 GTLM	BMW S63 4.4 L Twin Turbo V8	DAY; 5	SEB; 2	LBH; 5	LGA; 9	WGL; 3	MOS; 4	LIM; 7	ELK; 8	VIR; 5	AUS; 4	PET; 9		7th	298
2017	Porsche GT Team	GTLM	Porsche 911 RSR	Porsche 4.0 L Flat-6	DAY; 2	SEB; 7	LBH; 6	AUS; 4	WGL; 7	**MOS**; **7**	LIM; 1	ELK; 8	VIR; 8	LGA; 3	PET; 6		5th	295
2019	Black Swan Racing	GTD	Porsche 911 GT3 R	Porsche 4.0L Flat-6	DAY; 14	SEB	MDO	DET	WGL; 10	MOS	LIM	ELK	VIR	LGA	PET		41st	38

Sporting positions
Preceded by Christian Menzel	Porsche Carrera Cup Germany champion 2006	Succeeded by Uwe Alzen
Preceded by Robin Frijns; Stuart Leonard; Dries Vanthoor	Winner of the Bathurst 12 Hour; 2019; With: Matt Campbell & Dennis Olsen	Succeeded by Jules Gounon; Jordan Pepper; Maxime Soulet
