= Christian Menzel =

German racing driver (born 1971)

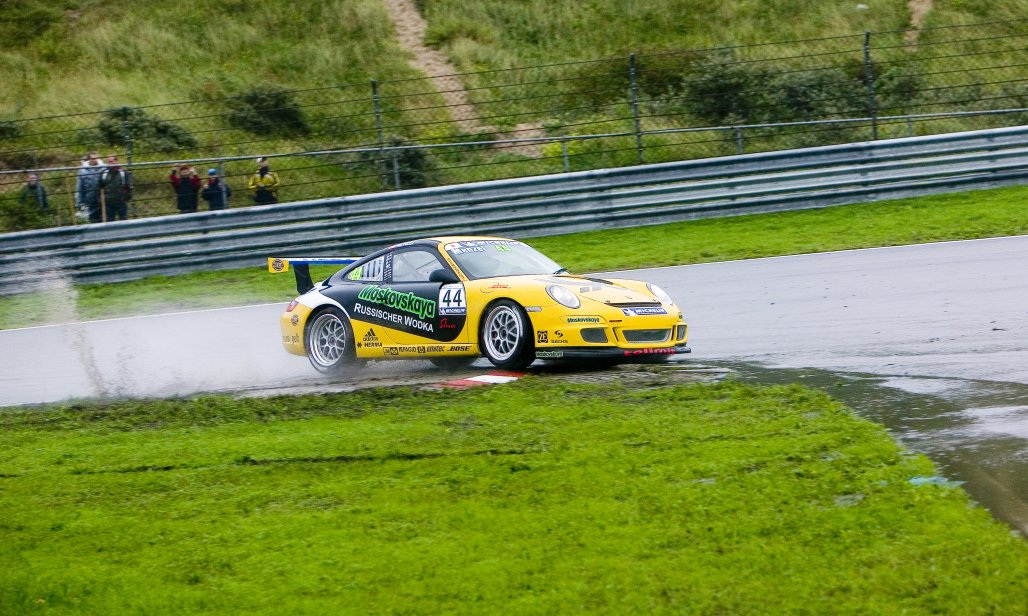
- Menzel in 2006
- Nationality: (Germany) German
- Born: 22 June 1971 (age 55) Langenfeld, Rhineland, Germany
- Relatives: Nico Menzel (son)
- Categorisation: FIA Gold (until 2019); FIA Silver (2022–)

Christian Menzel (born 22 June 1971 in Langenfeld, Rhineland) is a German racing driver.

Menzel's career started in 1981 in karts. Since 1991, he competed in ADAC BMW Formula Junior, later Formula Renault, and from 1994 to 1996, Formula 3.

In 1998, Menzel won the 24 Hours of Nürburgring together with Hans-Joachim Stuck and Marc Duez in a BMW 320 Diesel.

In 2000, Menzel was active in the Deutsche Tourenwagen Masters (DTM) for Opel. The main activity of Menzel then became racing in the Porsche Carrera Cup (winner 2005) and Porsche Supercup, alongside the VLN Series.

Since 2020, Menzel has been a brand ambassador for Rowe.

== Racing record ==
=== Complete Deutsche Tourenwagen Masters results ===
(key) (Races in bold indicate pole position) (Races in italics indicate fastest lap)

Year	Team	Car	1	2	3	4	5	6	7	8	9	10	11	12	13	14	15	16	DC	Pts
2000	Team HP-PZ Koblenz	Opel Astra V8 Coupé	HOC; 1; 14	HOC; 2; 11	OSC; 1; 14	OSC; 2 Ret	NOR; 1; 16	NOR; 2 Ret	SAC; 1; 9	SAC; 2; 13	NÜR; 1; 17	NÜR; 2; 9	OSC; 1 Ret	OSC; 2 Ret	NÜR; 1; 17	NÜR; 2; 10	HOC; 1 Ret	HOC; 2 DNS	17th	5

=== Complete Porsche Supercup results ===
(key) (Races in bold indicate pole position) (Races in italics indicate fastest lap)

Year	Team	Car	1	2	3	4	5	6	7	8	9	10	11	12	DC	Points
2002	Tolimit Motorsport	Porsche 996 GT3	ITA	ESP	AUT	MON	GER; 3	GBR	GER						NC‡	0‡
2002	Kwikpower XS Racing	Porsche 996 GT3								HUN; 11	BEL	ITA	USA	USA	NC‡	0‡
2003	Tolimit Motorsport	Porsche 996 GT3	ITA	ESP	AUT; 5	MON	GER; 21	FRA	GBR	GER; Ret	HUN	ITA; 6	USA	USA	NC‡	0‡
2004	Team HP-PZ Koblenz	Porsche 996 GT3	ITA; 2	ESP; 8	MON; 12	GER; 5	USA; 4	USA; 3	FRA; 2	GBR; 8	GER; 6	HUN; 21	BEL; 4	ITA; 2	**2nd**	**162**
2005	Tolimit Motorsport	Porsche 997 GT3	ITA; 5	ESP; 6	MON; 8	**GER**; 1	USA; 4	USA; 9	FRA; 4	GBR; 3	GER; Ret	HUN; 8	ITA; 14	BEL; 5	4th	139
2006	Tolimit Motorsport	Porsche 997 GT3	BHR; 7	ITA; 2	GER; 6	ESP; Ret	MON; 5	GBR; 4	USA; Ret	USA; Ret	FRA; 7	GER; 6	HUN; 2	ITA; 6	6th	114
2007	Tolimit Motorsport	Porsche 997 GT3	BHR; 7	BHR; 7	ESP; 3	MON; Ret	FRA; 20	GBR; 3	GER; 2	HUN; 6	TUR; 6	ITA; 5	BEL; 14		5th	104
2011	Haribo Racing Team	Porsche 997 GT3	TUR	ESP	MON	GER	GBR	GER; 9	HUN	BEL	ITA	UAE; 11	UAE; 11		NC‡	0‡

‡ Not eligible for points

Sporting positions
Preceded by Mike Rockenfeller	Porsche Carrera Cup Germany champion 2005	Succeeded by Dirk Werner
Preceded by Darryl O'Young	Porsche Carrera Cup Asia; Champion; 2009-2010	Succeeded by Keita Sawa
