= EBF =

EBF may refer to:

- EBF conference, an electronic procurement conference
- Encyclopædia Britannica Films
- English Border Front, the Shrewsbury Town hooligan firm.
- Epic Battle Fantasy, flash game series
- European Balloon Festival
- European Banking Federation
- European Baptist Federation
- European Bioanalysis Forum
- European Boxing Federation
