= 2009 24 Hours of Nürburgring =

Endurance motor race in Germany

2009 ADAC 24 Hours of Nürburgring

Seasons
- ← 2008 2010 →

Nürburgring 24h track (Nordschleife+GP Circuit without Mercedes-Arena)

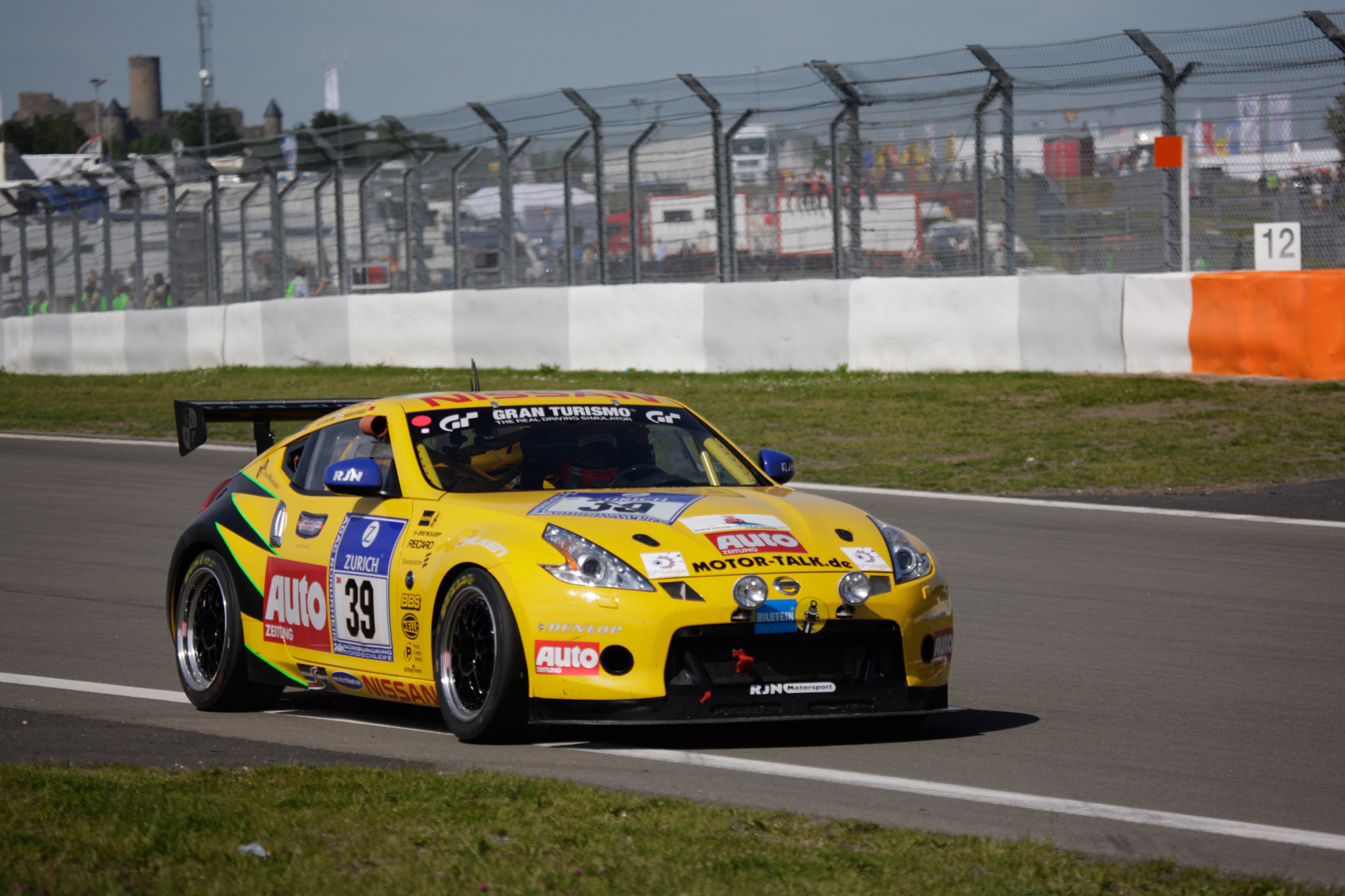
A Nissan 370Z during the 2009 24 Hours of Nürburgring

The 2009 ADAC Zurich 24 Hours of Nürburgring is the 37th running of the 24 Hours of Nürburgring. It took place over May 23–24, 2009. Manthey Racing's #1 Porsche claimed honours in the SP7 class and was the overall victor, completing 155 laps over the 24 hours. Team Abt Sportsline and their #97 Audi claimed second overall and finished as top runner in the SP9 GT3 class. 118 of the 170 starters were classified.

== Intro ==
For 2009, the organizers announced that they wanted to reduce the gap in speeds, by not accepting small capacity cars any more, and by slowing down the fastest classes, SP7 and SP8. Also, the new FIA GT3 and SRO GT4 classes were adopted, called SP9 and SP10. Some of the new rules are controversial, especially the fact that instead of the regular fuel pumps as used in any public station, the top teams have to use expensive equipment designed to equal the times needed to refill, meaning that an economic car is punished compared to a thirsty car. Due to the various rule changes, some teams have declined to take part, namely Zakspeed with their Viper.

Probably also due to the economic crisis, the number of entries is much lower than in previous years, with only 170 cars starting the race. Surprisingly, the pole was set by a Ford GT, followed closely by the four factory-entered Audi R8 LMS and two Porsche GT3 of the Manthey team. They have decided to enter their well-known RSR, which is basically a GT2 car, but now has about 70 hp less due to new air restrictors, and also a 997 GT3 Cup S, the version Porsche homologated for FIA GT3. For the first 19 hours, two of the Audis and the two Manthey Porsche battled for the lead within a lap, the pace likely to result in a new distance record. The Manthey #1 had been punished for approaching an accident site too quickly and had to wait 3 minutes in the box, but the decision was reverted later based on data logging evidence, with the lost time deducted from the results. Around 11:30, the #99 Audi which had a narrow lead was stopped by suspension problems. Following repairs this car finished in 5th position. This left the #97 Audi in second, and with the win in its class, 5 minutes behind the overall winner.

== Race results ==
Class winners in bold.

37. ADAC Zurich 24h Rennen
Pos	Class	No	Team	Drivers	Chassis	Tyre	Laps
Pos	Class	No	Team	Drivers	Engine	Tyre	Laps
1	**SP7**	**1**	**(Germany) Manthey Racing**	**(Germany) Timo Bernhard (Germany) Marc Lieb (France) Romain Dumas (Germany) Marcel Tiemann**	**Porsche 997 GT3-RSR**	**M**	**155**
1	**SP7**	**1**	**(Germany) Manthey Racing**	**(Germany) Timo Bernhard (Germany) Marc Lieb (France) Romain Dumas (Germany) Marcel Tiemann**	Porsche 4.0L Flat-6	**M**	**155**
2	**SP9; GT3**	**97**	**(Germany) Team Abt Sportsline**	**(Germany) Christian Abt (Belgium) Jean-Francois Hemroulle (Germany) Pierre Kaffer (Germany) Lucas Luhr**	**Audi R8 LMS**	**M**	**154**
2	**SP9; GT3**	**97**	**(Germany) Team Abt Sportsline**	**(Germany) Christian Abt (Belgium) Jean-Francois Hemroulle (Germany) Pierre Kaffer (Germany) Lucas Luhr**	Audi 5.2L V10	**M**	**154**
3	SP9; GT3	2	(Germany) Manthey Racing	(France) Emmanuel Collard (Germany) Wolf Henzler (Austria) Richard Lietz (Germany) Dirk Werner	Porsche 997 GT3 Cup S	**M**	152
3	SP9; GT3	2	(Germany) Manthey Racing	(France) Emmanuel Collard (Germany) Wolf Henzler (Austria) Richard Lietz (Germany) Dirk Werner	Porsche 3.6L Flat-6	**M**	152
4	SP9; GT3	18	(Germany) Uwe Alzen Automotive	(Germany) Uwe Alzen (Germany) Sascha Bert (Germany) Lance David Arnold (Germany) Christopher Mies	Porsche 997 GT3 Cup	**M**	150
4	SP9; GT3	18	(Germany) Uwe Alzen Automotive	(Germany) Uwe Alzen (Germany) Sascha Bert (Germany) Lance David Arnold (Germany) Christopher Mies	Porsche 3.6L Flat-6	**M**	150
5	SP9; GT3	99	(Germany) Phoenix Racing	(Germany) Marc Basseng (Switzerland) Marcel Fässler (Germany) Mike Rockenfeller (Germany) Frank Stippler	Audi R8 LMS	**M**	149
5	SP9; GT3	99	(Germany) Phoenix Racing	(Germany) Marc Basseng (Switzerland) Marcel Fässler (Germany) Mike Rockenfeller (Germany) Frank Stippler	Audi 5.2L V10	**M**	149
6	SP7	3	(Germany) Frikadelli Racing Team	(Germany) Sabine Schmitz (Germany) Klaus Abbelen (Germany) Dr. Edgar Althoff (Germany) Kenneth Heyer	Porsche 997 GT3-RSR	**Y**	149
6	SP7	3	(Germany) Frikadelli Racing Team	(Germany) Sabine Schmitz (Germany) Klaus Abbelen (Germany) Dr. Edgar Althoff (Germany) Kenneth Heyer	Porsche 4.0L Flat-6	**Y**	149
7	SP9; GT3	4	(Germany) Manthey Racing	(Germany) Frank Kräling (Germany) Marc Gindorf (New Zealand) Peter Scharmach (Germany) Marco Holzer	Porsche 997 GT3	**M**	149
7	SP9; GT3	4	(Germany) Manthey Racing	(Germany) Frank Kräling (Germany) Marc Gindorf (New Zealand) Peter Scharmach (Germany) Marco Holzer	Porsche 3.6L Flat-6	**M**	149
8	SP9; GT3	123	(Germany) Mühlner Motorsport	(Germany) Heinz-Josef Bermes (Germany) Oliver Kainz (Germany) Frank Schmickler (Germany) Jörg Bergmeister	Porsche 997 GT3 Cup S	**M**	148
8	SP9; GT3	123	(Germany) Mühlner Motorsport	(Germany) Heinz-Josef Bermes (Germany) Oliver Kainz (Germany) Frank Schmickler (Germany) Jörg Bergmeister	Porsche 3.6L Flat-6	**M**	148
9	SP7	29	VIP Petfoods Australia	(United Kingdom) Tony Quinn (Australia) Klark Quinn (New Zealand) Craig Baird (Australia) Grant Denyer	Porsche 997 RSR	**M**	146
9	SP7	29	VIP Petfoods Australia	(United Kingdom) Tony Quinn (Australia) Klark Quinn (New Zealand) Craig Baird (Australia) Grant Denyer	Porsche 3.8L Flat-6	**M**	146
10	**SP6**	**69**	**(Germany) Dörr Motorsport**	**(Germany) Rudi Adams (Germany) Luca Ludwig (Germany) Arnd Meier (Germany) Markus Grossmann**	**BMW Z4 M Coupe**	**P**	**145**
10	**SP6**	**69**	**(Germany) Dörr Motorsport**	**(Germany) Rudi Adams (Germany) Luca Ludwig (Germany) Arnd Meier (Germany) Markus Grossmann**	BMW S50 3.2L I6	**P**	**145**
11	SP7	28	(Japan) Falken Motorsport	(United Kingdom) Peter Dumbreck (Japan) Tetsuya Tanaka (Japan) Kazuki Hoshino (Germany) Dirk Schoysman	Nissan Z33	**F**	144
11	SP7	28	(Japan) Falken Motorsport	(United Kingdom) Peter Dumbreck (Japan) Tetsuya Tanaka (Japan) Kazuki Hoshino (Germany) Dirk Schoysman	Nissan 3.8L V6	**F**	144
12	SP9; GT3	98	(Germany) Phoenix Racing	(Germany) Hans-Joachim Stuck (Germany) Frank Biela (Italy) Emanuele Pirro (Switzerland) Marcel Fässler	Audi R8 LMS	**M**	144
12	SP9; GT3	98	(Germany) Phoenix Racing	(Germany) Hans-Joachim Stuck (Germany) Frank Biela (Italy) Emanuele Pirro (Switzerland) Marcel Fässler	Audi 5.2L V10	**M**	144
13	SP9; GT3	24	(Germany) steam-racing	(Germany) Michael Schratz (Germany) Jochen Herbst (Netherlands) Nick de Bruijn (Russia) Evgeny Tsarev	Porsche 997 GT3 Cup	**H**	143
13	SP9; GT3	24	(Germany) steam-racing	(Germany) Michael Schratz (Germany) Jochen Herbst (Netherlands) Nick de Bruijn (Russia) Evgeny Tsarev	Porsche 3.6L Flat-6	**H**	143
14	SP9; GT3	122	(Germany) CC Car Collection	(Germany) Peter Schmidt (Germany) Mirco Schultis (Slovakia) Miro Konôpka (Germany) Hannes Plesse	Porsche 997 GT3 Cup	?	143
14	SP9; GT3	122	(Germany) CC Car Collection	(Germany) Peter Schmidt (Germany) Mirco Schultis (Slovakia) Miro Konôpka (Germany) Hannes Plesse	Porsche 3.6L Flat-6	?	143
15	**SP3T**	**118**	**(Germany) Volkswagen Motorsport**	**(Sweden) Jimmy Johansson (Germany) Florian Gruber (Germany) Nicki Thiim (Austria) Martin Karlhofer**	**Volkswagen Scirocco GT24**	**M**	**142**
15	**SP3T**	**118**	**(Germany) Volkswagen Motorsport**	**(Sweden) Jimmy Johansson (Germany) Florian Gruber (Germany) Nicki Thiim (Austria) Martin Karlhofer**	Volkswagen TSI 2.0L Turbo I4	**M**	**142**
16	SP9; GT3	38	(Germany) RDM-Cargraphic-Logwin-Racing	(Germany) "Peter König" (Germany) Steffen Schlichenmeier (Germany) Jacques Meyer (Germany) Kurt Ecke	Porsche 997 GT3 Cup	?	141
16	SP9; GT3	38	(Germany) RDM-Cargraphic-Logwin-Racing	(Germany) "Peter König" (Germany) Steffen Schlichenmeier (Germany) Jacques Meyer (Germany) Kurt Ecke	Porsche 3.6L Flat-6	?	141
17	**AT**	**115**	**(Germany) Volkswagen Motorsport**	**(Belgium) Vanina Ickx (Germany) Thomas Klenke (Germany) Peter Terting (Germany) Klaus Niedzwiedz**	**Volkswagen Scirocco GT24-CNG**	**M**	**140**
17	**AT**	**115**	**(Germany) Volkswagen Motorsport**	**(Belgium) Vanina Ickx (Germany) Thomas Klenke (Germany) Peter Terting (Germany) Klaus Niedzwiedz**	Volkswagen TSI 2.0L Turbo I4	**M**	**140**
18	SP9; GT3	34	(Germany) Team DMV	(Germany) André Krumbach (Switzerland) Ivan Jacoma (Germany) Harald Schlotter (Germany) Holger Fuchs	Porsche 997 GT3	?	140
18	SP9; GT3	34	(Germany) Team DMV	(Germany) André Krumbach (Switzerland) Ivan Jacoma (Germany) Harald Schlotter (Germany) Holger Fuchs	Porsche 3.6L Flat-6	?	140
19	SP3T	107	(Germany) Raeder Automotive	(Germany) Elmar Deegner (Germany) Jürgen Wohlfart (Germany) Christoph Breuer (Germany) Hans Martin Gass	Audi S3	**D**	139
19	SP3T	107	(Germany) Raeder Automotive	(Germany) Elmar Deegner (Germany) Jürgen Wohlfart (Germany) Christoph Breuer (Germany) Hans Martin Gass	Audi FSI 2.0L Turbo I4	**D**	139
20	SP3T	116	(Germany) Volkswagen Motorsport	(Germany) Altfrid Heger (Netherlands) Carlo van Dam (China) Cheng Congfu (France) Franck Mailleux	Volkswagen Scirocco GT24	**M**	139
20	SP3T	116	(Germany) Volkswagen Motorsport	(Germany) Altfrid Heger (Netherlands) Carlo van Dam (China) Cheng Congfu (France) Franck Mailleux	Volkswagen TSI 2.0L Turbo I4	**M**	139
21	**SP8**	**7**	**(Germany) Team Dr. Ulrich Bez**	**(Germany) Dr. Ulrich Bez (United Kingdom) Chris Poritt (United Kingdom) Richard Meaden (Germany) Oliver Mathai**	**Aston Martin V12 Vantage RS**	**P**	**139**
21	**SP8**	**7**	**(Germany) Team Dr. Ulrich Bez**	**(Germany) Dr. Ulrich Bez (United Kingdom) Chris Poritt (United Kingdom) Richard Meaden (Germany) Oliver Mathai**	Aston Martin 6.0L V12	**P**	**139**
22	SP9; GT3	23	(United Kingdom) Team Willie Moore	(United Kingdom) Willie Moore (United Kingdom) Bill Cameron (United Kingdom) Calum Lockie	Porsche 997 GT3 Cup	?	138
22	SP9; GT3	23	(United Kingdom) Team Willie Moore	(United Kingdom) Willie Moore (United Kingdom) Bill Cameron (United Kingdom) Calum Lockie	Porsche 3.6L Flat-6	?	138
23	SP9; GT3	100	(Germany) Team Abt Sportsline	(Germany) Timo Scheider (Germany) Marco Werner (Sweden) Mattias Ekström (Germany) Lucas Luhr	Audi R8 LMS	**M**	137
23	SP9; GT3	100	(Germany) Team Abt Sportsline	(Germany) Timo Scheider (Germany) Marco Werner (Sweden) Mattias Ekström (Germany) Lucas Luhr	Audi 5.2L V10	**M**	137
24	**SP5**	**54**	**(Germany) MSC Rhön AvD**	**(Germany) Hubert Nacken (Germany) Christian Leutheuser (Germany) Benedikt Frey (Germany) Christopher Haase**	**BMW M3 E46**	**A**	**136**
24	**SP5**	**54**	**(Germany) MSC Rhön AvD**	**(Germany) Hubert Nacken (Germany) Christian Leutheuser (Germany) Benedikt Frey (Germany) Christopher Haase**	BMW 3.5L I6	**A**	**136**
25	**D1T**	**140**	**(Germany) Motorsport Arena Oschersleben**	**(Norway) Anders Buchardt (Norway) Nils Tronrud (United States) Michael Aurienma (United States) John Mayes**	**BMW 320d E90**	**D**	**136**
25	**D1T**	**140**	**(Germany) Motorsport Arena Oschersleben**	**(Norway) Anders Buchardt (Norway) Nils Tronrud (United States) Michael Aurienma (United States) John Mayes**	BMW 2.0L Turbo I4 (Diesel)	**D**	**136**
26	SP9; GT3	93	(Germany) Scuderia Offenbach	(Germany) Matthias Weiland (Lithuania) Andžėj Dzikėvič (Germany) Dr. Michael Klein (Luxembourg) Antonine Feidt	Porsche 997 GT3 Cup	?	136
26	SP9; GT3	93	(Germany) Scuderia Offenbach	(Germany) Matthias Weiland (Lithuania) Andžėj Dzikėvič (Germany) Dr. Michael Klein (Luxembourg) Antonine Feidt	Porsche 3.6L Flat-6	?	136
27	SP9; GT3	26	(Germany) Alpina	(Germany) Andreas Bovensiepen (Germany) Andreas Wirth (Germany) Franz Engstler (Germany) Patrick Bernhardt	BMW Alpina B6 GT3	**M**	135
27	SP9; GT3	26	(Germany) Alpina	(Germany) Andreas Bovensiepen (Germany) Andreas Wirth (Germany) Franz Engstler (Germany) Patrick Bernhardt	BMW N62 4.4L S/C V8	**M**	135
28	D1T	138	(Germany) Motorsport Arena Oschersleben	(Germany) Emin Akata (Germany) Jürgen Dinstühler (Germany) Andread Winkler (Germany) Torsten Schubert	BMW 320d E90	**D**	135
28	D1T	138	(Germany) Motorsport Arena Oschersleben	(Germany) Emin Akata (Germany) Jürgen Dinstühler (Germany) Andread Winkler (Germany) Torsten Schubert	BMW 2.0L Turbo I4 (Diesel)	**D**	135
29	D1T	137	(Germany) GRC Racing	(United Kingdom) Jacob Thomsen (Norway) Harald Nordeng (Germany) Dirk Hemmersbach (Denmark) Michael Outzen	BMW 120d	?	135
29	D1T	137	(Germany) GRC Racing	(United Kingdom) Jacob Thomsen (Norway) Harald Nordeng (Germany) Dirk Hemmersbach (Denmark) Michael Outzen	BMW M87 2.0L Turbo I4 (Diesel)	?	135
30	SP6	53	(Germany) MSC Rhön AvD	(France) Pierre de Thoisy (France) Thierry Depoix (France) Philippe Haezebrouck	BMW M3 E46	?	134
30	SP6	53	(Germany) MSC Rhön AvD	(France) Pierre de Thoisy (France) Thierry Depoix (France) Philippe Haezebrouck	BMW 3.3L I6	?	134
31	**SP10; GT4**	**9**	**(Germany) Team Dr. Alexander Kolb**	**(Germany) Dr. Alexander Kolb (Switzerland) Richard Karner (Germany) Maximlian Werndl (Germany) Dr. Olaf Hoppelshäuser**	**Aston Martin V8 Vantage N24**	?	**134**
31	**SP10; GT4**	**9**	**(Germany) Team Dr. Alexander Kolb**	**(Germany) Dr. Alexander Kolb (Switzerland) Richard Karner (Germany) Maximlian Werndl (Germany) Dr. Olaf Hoppelshäuser**	Aston Martin 4.3L V8	?	**134**
32	SP3T	89	(Germany) TIC Racing	(Germany) Karsten Quadder (Germany) Uwe Nittel (Germany) Takao Matsui (Germany) Tobias Hagenmeyer	Mitsubishi Lancer Evolution X	**D**	133
32	SP3T	89	(Germany) TIC Racing	(Germany) Karsten Quadder (Germany) Uwe Nittel (Germany) Takao Matsui (Germany) Tobias Hagenmeyer	Mitsubishi 4B11T 2.0L Turbo I4	**D**	133
33	SP3T	86	(Japan) Subaru Tecnica International	(Japan) Kazuo Shimizu (Japan) Toshihiro Yoshida (Japan) Naoki Hattori (Japan) Koji Matsuda	Subaru Impreza WRX STi GRB	**D**	133
33	SP3T	86	(Japan) Subaru Tecnica International	(Japan) Kazuo Shimizu (Japan) Toshihiro Yoshida (Japan) Naoki Hattori (Japan) Koji Matsuda	Subaru EJ207 2.0L Turbo Flat-4	**D**	133
34	**V5**	**173**	**(Germany) Dolate Motorsport**	**(Germany) Mathias Unger (Germany) Daniel Zils (Germany) Uwe Ebertz (Germany) Timo Schupp**	**BMW Z4 Coupe**	**Y**	**132**
34	**V5**	**173**	**(Germany) Dolate Motorsport**	**(Germany) Mathias Unger (Germany) Daniel Zils (Germany) Uwe Ebertz (Germany) Timo Schupp**	BMW N52 3.0L I6	**Y**	**132**
35	V5	178	(Germany) Bonk Motorsport	(Germany) Oliver Rövenlich (Germany) Peter Bonk (Germany) Wolf Silvester (Germany) Stefan Aust	BMW M3 E36	**Y**	132
35	V5	178	(Germany) Bonk Motorsport	(Germany) Oliver Rövenlich (Germany) Peter Bonk (Germany) Wolf Silvester (Germany) Stefan Aust	BMW S50 3.0L I6	**Y**	132
36	SP10; GT4	8	(Germany) Team Wolfgang Schuhbauer	(Germany) Wolfgang Schuhbauer (Japan) Shinichi Katsura (Germany) Horst von Saruma-Jeltsch (Germany) Dr. Ulrich Bez	Aston Martin V8 Vantage N24	**P**	132
36	SP10; GT4	8	(Germany) Team Wolfgang Schuhbauer	(Germany) Wolfgang Schuhbauer (Japan) Shinichi Katsura (Germany) Horst von Saruma-Jeltsch (Germany) Dr. Ulrich Bez	Aston Martin 4.3L V8	**P**	132
37	SP7	33	(Germany) Porsche Center Boras	(Germany) Christer Pernvall (Germany) Cleas Lund (Sweden) Hans Andreasson	Porsche 996 GT3 Cup	**M**	132
37	SP7	33	(Germany) Porsche Center Boras	(Germany) Christer Pernvall (Germany) Cleas Lund (Sweden) Hans Andreasson	Porsche 3.6L Flat-6	**M**	132
38	**SP8T**	**96**	**(Germany) Dörr Motorsport**	**(Germany) Dierk Möller-Sonntag (Germany) Guido Naumann (Germany) Rolf Scheibner (Germany) Markus Grossmann**	**BMW 135i**	**P**	**132**
38	**SP8T**	**96**	**(Germany) Dörr Motorsport**	**(Germany) Dierk Möller-Sonntag (Germany) Guido Naumann (Germany) Rolf Scheibner (Germany) Markus Grossmann**	BMW N54 3.0L Turbo I6	**P**	**132**
39	SP5	81	(Germany) live-strip.com Racing	(Austria) Ulrich Neuser (Germany) Nicky Nufer (Germany) Fabian Plentz (Germany) Dennis Nägele	BMW Compact GTR	**A**	131
39	SP5	81	(Germany) live-strip.com Racing	(Austria) Ulrich Neuser (Germany) Nicky Nufer (Germany) Fabian Plentz (Germany) Dennis Nägele	BMW 3.0L I6	**A**	131
40	**V6**	**188**	**(Germany) Sartorius Team Black Falcon**	**(United Kingdom) Ralf Willems (Germany) Maik Rosenberg (United Kingdom) Andrew Baughan (United Kingdom) Sean Paul Breslin**	**BMW M3 E46**	**Y**	**131**
40	**V6**	**188**	**(Germany) Sartorius Team Black Falcon**	**(United Kingdom) Ralf Willems (Germany) Maik Rosenberg (United Kingdom) Andrew Baughan (United Kingdom) Sean Paul Breslin**	BMW M54 3.2L I6	**Y**	**131**
41	V5	171	(Germany) Team Werner Gusenbauer	(Germany) Werner Gusenbauer (Germany) Andreas Herwerth (Germany) Rainer Kathan (Germany) Alexander Schula	BMW M3 E36	**Y**	130
41	V5	171	(Germany) Team Werner Gusenbauer	(Germany) Werner Gusenbauer (Germany) Andreas Herwerth (Germany) Rainer Kathan (Germany) Alexander Schula	BMW S50 3.0L I6	**Y**	130
42	V5	169	Ukraine Racing Team	(Ukraine) Alex Mochanov (Ukraine) Andrij Kruglik (Ukraine) Oleksandr Gayday (Ukraine) Aleksey Basov	BMW M3 E36	?	130
42	V5	169	Ukraine Racing Team	(Ukraine) Alex Mochanov (Ukraine) Andrij Kruglik (Ukraine) Oleksandr Gayday (Ukraine) Aleksey Basov	BMW S50 3.0L I6	?	130
43	SP5	176	(Germany) Sartorius Team Black Falcon	(Germany) Daniel Schwerfeldt (Netherlands) Eric Peter Weijers (Netherlands) Ron Swart (Switzerland) Marc Colell	BMW Z4 Coupe	**Y**	130
43	SP5	176	(Germany) Sartorius Team Black Falcon	(Germany) Daniel Schwerfeldt (Netherlands) Eric Peter Weijers (Netherlands) Ron Swart (Switzerland) Marc Colell	BMW N52 3.0L I6	**Y**	130
44	**D3T**	**149**	**(Germany) RG Berg Gladbach**	**(Germany) Thomas Haider (Germany) Rainer Kutsch (Germany) Ralf Kraus (Germany) Christian Jacobsen**	**BMW 330d E46**	**M**	**130**
44	**D3T**	**149**	**(Germany) RG Berg Gladbach**	**(Germany) Thomas Haider (Germany) Rainer Kutsch (Germany) Ralf Kraus (Germany) Christian Jacobsen**	BMW M57 2.9L Turbo I6 (Diesel)	**M**	**130**
45	V6	184	(Germany) MS Racing	(Switzerland) Harald Böttner (Germany) Hans Stukenbrock (Switzerland) Marco Poltera	Porsche 996	**M**	130
45	V6	184	(Germany) MS Racing	(Switzerland) Harald Böttner (Germany) Hans Stukenbrock (Switzerland) Marco Poltera	Porsche 3.4L Flat-6	**M**	130
46	SP3T	83	(Germany) König Komfort	(Germany) Roland Wachskau (Germany) Rudi Speich (Germany) Klaus Hormes	Audi A3 1.8T	**D**	129
46	SP3T	83	(Germany) König Komfort	(Germany) Roland Wachskau (Germany) Rudi Speich (Germany) Klaus Hormes	Audi TFSI 1.8L Turbo I4	**D**	129
47	SP10; GT4	60	(Germany) Motorsport Arena Oschersleben	(Germany) Jörg Müller (United Kingdom) Andy Priaulx (Germany) Jochen Übler (Germany) Marcus Schurig	BMW M3 GT4	**D**	129
47	SP10; GT4	60	(Germany) Motorsport Arena Oschersleben	(Germany) Jörg Müller (United Kingdom) Andy Priaulx (Germany) Jochen Übler (Germany) Marcus Schurig	BMW S65 4.0L V8	**D**	129
48	SP9; GT3	124	(Germany) Mühlner Motorsport	(Germany) Dieter Schornstien (Sweden) Ulf Karlsson (United Kingdom) Mark J. Thomas (Germany) Oliver Kainz	Porsche 997 GT3 Cup S	**M**	129
48	SP9; GT3	124	(Germany) Mühlner Motorsport	(Germany) Dieter Schornstien (Sweden) Ulf Karlsson (United Kingdom) Mark J. Thomas (Germany) Oliver Kainz	Porsche 3.6L Flat-6	**M**	129
49	D3T	148	(Germany) Team Henning Meyersrenken	(Germany) Henning Meyersrenken (Germany) Thomas Haider (Germany) Reinhard Schall (Germany) Günter Beckers	BMW 335d E46 GTR	**M**	128
49	D3T	148	(Germany) Team Henning Meyersrenken	(Germany) Henning Meyersrenken (Germany) Thomas Haider (Germany) Reinhard Schall (Germany) Günter Beckers	BMW 3.0L Turbo I6 (Diesel)	**M**	128
50	V5	175	(Germany) Team Christoph Rendlen	(Germany) Reinhard Huber (Germany) Matthias Pahlke (Germany) Christoph Rendlen (Germany) Peter Rubatto	BMW Z4 Coupe	**D**	128
50	V5	175	(Germany) Team Christoph Rendlen	(Germany) Reinhard Huber (Germany) Matthias Pahlke (Germany) Christoph Rendlen (Germany) Peter Rubatto	BMW N52 3.0L I6	**D**	128
51	SP3T	119	(Germany) Team Klaus Werner	(Germany) Klaus Werner (Germany) Michael Budde (Germany) Martin Kinzler (Germany) Franz Borkowsky	SEAT León Supercopa	**M**	128
51	SP3T	119	(Germany) Team Klaus Werner	(Germany) Klaus Werner (Germany) Michael Budde (Germany) Martin Kinzler (Germany) Franz Borkowsky	SEAT TFSI 2.0L Turbo I4	**M**	128
52	**V4**	**164**	**(Germany) MSC Ruhr-Bilz**	**(Germany) Michael Eichhorn (Germany) Roland Botor (Germany) Frank Aust**	**BMW 325i E46**	**D**	**127**
52	**V4**	**164**	**(Germany) MSC Ruhr-Bilz**	**(Germany) Michael Eichhorn (Germany) Roland Botor (Germany) Frank Aust**	BMW M54 2.5L I6	**D**	**127**
53	D1T	136	(Germany) Team Eberhard Rattunde	(Germany) Eberhard Rattunde (New Zealand) Maurice O'Reilly (New Zealand) Wayne Moore (Germany) Heinrich Immig	Volkswagen Golf Mk 5 TDI	**D**	127
53	D1T	136	(Germany) Team Eberhard Rattunde	(Germany) Eberhard Rattunde (New Zealand) Maurice O'Reilly (New Zealand) Wayne Moore (Germany) Heinrich Immig	Volkswagen TDI 2.0L Turbo I4 (Diesel)	**D**	127
54	SP10; GT4	20	Aston Martin Belgium	(Belgium) Arnold Herreman (Belgium) Kurt Dujardyn (Belgium) Anton Gohnissen (Belgium) Jean-Paul Herreman	Aston Martin V8 Vantage N24	?	127
54	SP10; GT4	20	Aston Martin Belgium	(Belgium) Arnold Herreman (Belgium) Kurt Dujardyn (Belgium) Anton Gohnissen (Belgium) Jean-Paul Herreman	Aston Martin 4.3L V8	?	127
55	D1T	142	BMW Team Hungary	(Hungary) László Palik (Hungary) János Vida (Hungary) Csaba Walter (Hungary) Gábor Wéber	BMW 120d	**D**	126
55	D1T	142	BMW Team Hungary	(Hungary) László Palik (Hungary) János Vida (Hungary) Csaba Walter (Hungary) Gábor Wéber	BMW M47 2.0L Turbo I4 (Diesel)	**D**	126
56	SP6	48	(United Kingdom) Team Guy Povey	(United Kingdom) Guy Povey (United Kingdom) Graham Coomes (Australia) Dennis Cribbin (Australia) Alan Sheperd	BMW M3 E46	**D**	126
56	SP6	48	(United Kingdom) Team Guy Povey	(United Kingdom) Guy Povey (United Kingdom) Graham Coomes (Australia) Dennis Cribbin (Australia) Alan Sheperd	BMW S54 3.2L I6	**D**	126
57	V5	180	(Germany) MSC Rhön	(Germany) Ulli Packeisen (Italy) Maurizio Cavallari (Austria) Richard Purtscher	BMW M3 E36 GT	?	125
57	V5	180	(Germany) MSC Rhön	(Germany) Ulli Packeisen (Italy) Maurizio Cavallari (Austria) Richard Purtscher	BMW S50 3.0L I6	?	125
58	SP5	63	(Germany) Team Michael Tischner	(Germany) Michael Tischner (Germany) Ulrich Becker (Germany) Klaus Völker (Germany) Matthias Tischner	BMW M3 E46	?	125
58	SP5	63	(Germany) Team Michael Tischner	(Germany) Michael Tischner (Germany) Ulrich Becker (Germany) Klaus Völker (Germany) Matthias Tischner	BMW 3.0L I6	?	125
59	**V3**	**157**	**(Germany) MSC Wahlscheid**	**(Germany) Michael Jestädt (Germany) Rolf Derscheid (Germany) Michael Flehmer (Germany) Werner Schlehecker**	**BMW 318is**	**M**	**125**
59	**V3**	**157**	**(Germany) MSC Wahlscheid**	**(Germany) Michael Jestädt (Germany) Rolf Derscheid (Germany) Michael Flehmer (Germany) Werner Schlehecker**	BMW M44 1.9L I4	**M**	**125**
60	V4	160	(Germany) Team Frank Hempel	(Germany) Frank Hempel (Germany) Hannes Pfledder (Germany) Gunther Stecher	Mercedes Benz 190 E 2.5 16V	**Y**	124
60	V4	160	(Germany) Team Frank Hempel	(Germany) Frank Hempel (Germany) Hannes Pfledder (Germany) Gunther Stecher	Mercedes-Benz (Cosworth) M102 2.5L I4	**Y**	124
61	V4	163	(Germany) Dolate Motorsport	(Germany) Jürgen Meyer (Germany) Uwe Frey (Germany) Titus Dittmann (Germany) Julius Dittmann	BMW 325i E46	?	124
61	V4	163	(Germany) Dolate Motorsport	(Germany) Jürgen Meyer (Germany) Uwe Frey (Germany) Titus Dittmann (Germany) Julius Dittmann	BMW M54 2.5L I6	?	124
62	**SP4T**	**76**	**(Germany) MSC Adenau**	**(Germany) Dr. Jens Luddmann (Germany) Jürgen Gagstatter (Germany) Guido Bühler (Germany) Stephan Wölflick**	**Ford Mondeo**	**M**	**123**
62	**SP4T**	**76**	**(Germany) MSC Adenau**	**(Germany) Dr. Jens Luddmann (Germany) Jürgen Gagstatter (Germany) Guido Bühler (Germany) Stephan Wölflick**	Ford 2.5L Turbo I5	**M**	**123**
63	SP5	57	(Germany) Team Friedhelm Obermeier	(Germany) Reiner Bardenheuer (Germany) Friedrich Obermeier (Germany) Friedhelm Obermeier (Germany) Hans Schütt	BMW M3 E36	**M**	123
63	SP5	57	(Germany) Team Friedhelm Obermeier	(Germany) Reiner Bardenheuer (Germany) Friedrich Obermeier (Germany) Friedhelm Obermeier (Germany) Hans Schütt	BMW S50 3.0L I6	**M**	123
64	SP8T	95	(Germany) Dörr Motorsport	(Germany) Otto Hofmayer (Germany) Thomas Kroher (Germany) Christian Gebhardt (Germany) Philipp Leisen	BMW 135i	**P**	123
64	SP8T	95	(Germany) Dörr Motorsport	(Germany) Otto Hofmayer (Germany) Thomas Kroher (Germany) Christian Gebhardt (Germany) Philipp Leisen	BMW N54 3.0L Turbo I6	**P**	123
65	**SP3**	**121**	**(Germany) Kissling Motorsport**	**(Germany) Marco Wolf (Germany) Otto Fritzsche (Germany) Jürgen Fritzsche (Germany) Stefan Kissling**	**Opel Astra GTC**	**M**	**122**
65	**SP3**	**121**	**(Germany) Kissling Motorsport**	**(Germany) Marco Wolf (Germany) Otto Fritzsche (Germany) Jürgen Fritzsche (Germany) Stefan Kissling**	Opel 2.0L I4	**M**	**122**
66	V3	154	(Germany) Team Thomas Simon	(Germany) Thomas Simon (Germany) Ronald Rumm (Germany) Karl-Heinz Willmann (Germany) Kornelius Hoffmann	BMW 318is E36	**M**	122
66	V3	154	(Germany) Team Thomas Simon	(Germany) Thomas Simon (Germany) Ronald Rumm (Germany) Karl-Heinz Willmann (Germany) Kornelius Hoffmann	BMW M44 1.9L I4	**M**	122
67	SP6	52	(Germany) Team ROWE Motorsport	(Germany) Marco Schelp (Germany) Thoomas Kappeler (Netherlands) Donald Molenaar (France) Arnaud Peyroles	BMW M3 E46 WTC	**D**	122
67	SP6	52	(Germany) Team ROWE Motorsport	(Germany) Marco Schelp (Germany) Thoomas Kappeler (Netherlands) Donald Molenaar (France) Arnaud Peyroles	BMW 3.5L I6	**D**	122
68	SP5	64	(Italy) Superchallenge	(Italy) Roberto Ragazzi (Italy) Beppe Arlotti (Italy) Bruno Barbaro (Italy) Fabrizio Gini	BMW M3 E36	?	122
68	SP5	64	(Italy) Superchallenge	(Italy) Roberto Ragazzi (Italy) Beppe Arlotti (Italy) Bruno Barbaro (Italy) Fabrizio Gini	BMW S50 3.0L I6	?	122
69	V4	162	(Germany) Sartorius Team Black Falcon	(Germany) Alexander Böhm (Ukraine) Andrii Lebed (Germany) Kai Riebetz (Germany) Sebastian Kamps	BMW 325i E90	**Y**	121
69	V4	162	(Germany) Sartorius Team Black Falcon	(Germany) Alexander Böhm (Ukraine) Andrii Lebed (Germany) Kai Riebetz (Germany) Sebastian Kamps	BMW 2.5L I6	**Y**	121
70	V3	152	(Germany) Team Günter Memminger	(Germany) Günter Memminger (Germany) Stefan Memminger (Germany) Christoph Unterhuber	BMW 318is E36	**M**	121
70	V3	152	(Germany) Team Günter Memminger	(Germany) Günter Memminger (Germany) Stefan Memminger (Germany) Christoph Unterhuber	BMW M44 1.9L I4	**M**	121
71	**N2**	**190**	**(Germany) Team Frank Kuhlmann**	**(Germany) Frank Kuhlmann (Germany) Sascha Gies (Germany) Frank Janetzky (Germany) Thomas Heitmann**	**Honda Civic Type R**	?	**121**
71	**N2**	**190**	**(Germany) Team Frank Kuhlmann**	**(Germany) Frank Kuhlmann (Germany) Sascha Gies (Germany) Frank Janetzky (Germany) Thomas Heitmann**	Honda K20A 2.0L I4	?	**121**
72	V4	161	(Germany) Team Josef Knechtges	(Germany) Josef Knechtges (Germany) Carsten Knechtges (Germany) Mirko Keller (Germany) Sven Esch	BMW 325i E90	?	120
72	V4	161	(Germany) Team Josef Knechtges	(Germany) Josef Knechtges (Germany) Carsten Knechtges (Germany) Mirko Keller (Germany) Sven Esch	BMW 2.5L I6	?	120
73	D1T	131	(Netherlands) Marcos Racing International	(United States) Hal Prewitt (United States) Jim Briody (El Salvador) Toto Lassally (Netherlands) Cor Euser	BMW 120d	**D**	120
73	D1T	131	(Netherlands) Marcos Racing International	(United States) Hal Prewitt (United States) Jim Briody (El Salvador) Toto Lassally (Netherlands) Cor Euser	BMW M47 2.0L Turbo I4 (Diesel)	**D**	120
74	V5	181	(Germany) MSC Rhön	(Germany) Gerd Niemeier (Austria) Dr. Armin Zumtobel (Austria) Erich Trinkl (Austria) Hannes Neuhauser	BMW M3 E36 GT	?	120
74	V5	181	(Germany) MSC Rhön	(Germany) Gerd Niemeier (Austria) Dr. Armin Zumtobel (Austria) Erich Trinkl (Austria) Hannes Neuhauser	BMW S50 3.0L I6	?	120
75	SP5	61	(Australia) Brunswick Automotive	(Australia) Ric Shaw (Australia) Steve Borness (Australia) Anthony Robson (Australia) Robert Rubis	BMW 130i	**D**	120
75	SP5	61	(Australia) Brunswick Automotive	(Australia) Ric Shaw (Australia) Steve Borness (Australia) Anthony Robson (Australia) Robert Rubis	BMW N52 3.0L I6	**D**	120
76	SP6	49	(Germany) Team Tschornia Motorsport	(Japan) Kenichi Maejima (Japan) Izumi Yoshida (Japan) Hiroyuki Kishimoto (Germany) Jürgen Bussmann	BMW M3 E46	**Y**	120
76	SP6	49	(Germany) Team Tschornia Motorsport	(Japan) Kenichi Maejima (Japan) Izumi Yoshida (Japan) Hiroyuki Kishimoto (Germany) Jürgen Bussmann	BMW S54 3.2L I6	**Y**	120
77	N2	193	(New Zealand) Team Mark Corbett	(New Zealand) Mark Corbett (New Zealand) Brent Greer (New Zealand) Rod Hicks (New Zealand) Dean Cockerton	Honda Civic Type R	?	119
77	N2	193	(New Zealand) Team Mark Corbett	(New Zealand) Mark Corbett (New Zealand) Brent Greer (New Zealand) Rod Hicks (New Zealand) Dean Cockerton	Honda K20A 2.0L I4	?	119
78	V6	187	(Germany) Team Eugen Sing	(Germany) Eugen Sing (Germany) Friedhelm (Germany) Thomas Heinrich	Mercedes-Benz SLK 350	**D**	119
78	V6	187	(Germany) Team Eugen Sing	(Germany) Eugen Sing (Germany) Friedhelm (Germany) Thomas Heinrich	Mercedes-Benz 3.5L V6	**D**	119
79	V3	151	(Germany) Bonk Motorsport	(Germany) Lutz Kögel (Germany) Axel Burghardt (Germany) Aldo Hovenjürgen (Germany) Andreas Möntmann	BMW 318ti	**Y**	118
79	V3	151	(Germany) Bonk Motorsport	(Germany) Lutz Kögel (Germany) Axel Burghardt (Germany) Aldo Hovenjürgen (Germany) Andreas Möntmann	BMW M42 1.8L I4	**Y**	118
80	SP8	11	(New Zealand) Kiwi Team Nürburgring	(New Zealand) Andy Booth (New Zealand) Timothy Martin (New Zealand) Stuart Owers (New Zealand) Lewis Scott	Audi RS4	**D**	118
80	SP8	11	(New Zealand) Kiwi Team Nürburgring	(New Zealand) Andy Booth (New Zealand) Timothy Martin (New Zealand) Stuart Owers (New Zealand) Lewis Scott	Audi 4.2L V8	**D**	118
81	SP8	16	(Japan) Gazoo Racing	(Japan) Akio Toyoda ("Morizo") (Japan) Hiromu Naruse (Japan) Minoru Takaki (Japan) Yoshinobu Katsumata	Lexus IS F	**B**	117
81	SP8	16	(Japan) Gazoo Racing	(Japan) Akio Toyoda ("Morizo") (Japan) Hiromu Naruse (Japan) Minoru Takaki (Japan) Yoshinobu Katsumata	Lexus 2UR-GSE 5.0L V8	**B**	117
82	SP3	103	(Germany) Mathol Racing	(Germany) Wolfgang Weber (Switzerland) Mario Meier (Germany) Heinz-Josef Bermes (Germany) Alexander Plenagel	Honda Civic Type R	**BF**	116
82	SP3	103	(Germany) Mathol Racing	(Germany) Wolfgang Weber (Switzerland) Mario Meier (Germany) Heinz-Josef Bermes (Germany) Alexander Plenagel	Honda K20Z4 2.0L I4	**BF**	116
83	N2	156	(Belgium) East Belgian Racing Team	(Belgium) Jacky Delvaux (Belgium) Rene Marin (Belgium) Bruno Beulen (Germany) Wolfgang Haugg	Renault Clio RS	?	116
83	N2	156	(Belgium) East Belgian Racing Team	(Belgium) Jacky Delvaux (Belgium) Rene Marin (Belgium) Bruno Beulen (Germany) Wolfgang Haugg	Renault 2.0L I4	?	116
84	SP3	102	(Germany) Mathol Racing	(Switzerland) Sebastien Schäfer (Germany) Christian Eichner (Germany) Michael Imholz (Germany) Dirk Cohausz	Honda Civic Type R	**BF**	114
84	SP3	102	(Germany) Mathol Racing	(Switzerland) Sebastien Schäfer (Germany) Christian Eichner (Germany) Michael Imholz (Germany) Dirk Cohausz	Honda K20Z4 2.0L I4	**BF**	114
85	N2	192	(New Zealand) Team Brian McGovern	(New Zealand) Brian McGovern (New Zealand) Jeffray Lowery (New Zealand) Alistair Taylor (New Zealand) Dr. Gregory Taylor	Honda Civic Type R	?	114
85	N2	192	(New Zealand) Team Brian McGovern	(New Zealand) Brian McGovern (New Zealand) Jeffray Lowery (New Zealand) Alistair Taylor (New Zealand) Dr. Gregory Taylor	Honda K20A 2.0L I4	?	114
86	V3	153	(Germany) Team Sebastien Krell	(Germany) Sebastien Krell (Germany) Marco Keller (Germany) Jörg Krell (Germany) Jörg Kurowski	BMW 318is E36	**Y**	114
86	V3	153	(Germany) Team Sebastien Krell	(Germany) Sebastien Krell (Germany) Marco Keller (Germany) Jörg Krell (Germany) Jörg Kurowski	BMW M42 1.8L I4	**Y**	114
87	SP8	14	(Japan) Gazoo Racing	(Japan) "Morizo" (Costa Rica) Javier Quiros (Japan) Takayuki Kinoshita (Japan) Akira Iida	Lexus LF-A	**B**	114
87	SP8	14	(Japan) Gazoo Racing	(Japan) "Morizo" (Costa Rica) Javier Quiros (Japan) Takayuki Kinoshita (Japan) Akira Iida	Lexus 4.8L V10	**B**	114
88	SP9; GT3	27	(Germany) Horn Motorsport	(Germany) David Horn (Germany) Michael Illbruck (Germany) Hans-Georg Horn (Germany) Christian Ried	Porsche 997 GT3 Cup	**H**	114
88	SP9; GT3	27	(Germany) Horn Motorsport	(Germany) David Horn (Germany) Michael Illbruck (Germany) Hans-Georg Horn (Germany) Christian Ried	Porsche 3.6L Flat-6	**H**	114
89	V6	186	(Germany) Team Ralf Schnitzler	(Germany) Uwe Reich (Germany) Ralf Schnitzler (Germany) Christian Caron (Germany) Herbert von Dornwitz	BMW M3 E46	**H**	113
89	V6	186	(Germany) Team Ralf Schnitzler	(Germany) Uwe Reich (Germany) Ralf Schnitzler (Germany) Christian Caron (Germany) Herbert von Dornwitz	BMW S54 3.2L I6	**H**	113
90	V5	170	(Australia) Team Richard Gartner	(Australia) Richard Gartner (Australia) Ray Stubber (Australia) Paul Stubber	BMW M3 E36	**Y**	113
90	V5	170	(Australia) Team Richard Gartner	(Australia) Richard Gartner (Australia) Ray Stubber (Australia) Paul Stubber	BMW S50 3.0L I6	**Y**	113
91	**D2T**	**134**	**(Germany) pro-handicap**	**(Germany) Wolfgang Müller (Germany) Oliver Rudolph**	**Opel Astra Caravan OPC**	?	**111**
91	**D2T**	**134**	**(Germany) pro-handicap**	**(Germany) Wolfgang Müller (Germany) Oliver Rudolph**	Opel CDTi 1.9L Turbo I4 (Diesel)	?	**111**
92	SP5	172	(Germany) Team Dieter Weidenbrück	(Germany) Dieter Weidenbrück (Germany) Dr. Guido Wegner (Germany) Markus Schmickler (Germany) Friedhelm Tang	BMW Z4 Coupe	**Y**	111
92	SP5	172	(Germany) Team Dieter Weidenbrück	(Germany) Dieter Weidenbrück (Germany) Dr. Guido Wegner (Germany) Markus Schmickler (Germany) Friedhelm Tang	BMW N52 3.0L I6	**Y**	111
93	SP7	36	(Germany) Sartorius Team Black Falcon	(Germany) Bona Ventura (Netherlands) Dillon Koster (Italy) Diego Romanini (Germany) Christer Jöns	BMW M3 E92	**Y**	110
93	SP7	36	(Germany) Sartorius Team Black Falcon	(Germany) Bona Ventura (Netherlands) Dillon Koster (Italy) Diego Romanini (Germany) Christer Jöns	BMW S65 4.0L V8	**Y**	110
94	D2T	253	(Belgium) TES Racing	(Belgium) Herwig Daenens (Belgium) Bruno Miguel (Belgium) Michael Cieters (Belgium) Jean-Luc Behets	Toyota Auris	**D**	110
94	D2T	253	(Belgium) TES Racing	(Belgium) Herwig Daenens (Belgium) Bruno Miguel (Belgium) Michael Cieters (Belgium) Jean-Luc Behets	Toyota 2AD-FHV 2.2L Turbo I4 (Diesel)	**D**	110
95	SP8	45	(Germany) Derichs Rennwagen	(United Kingdom) Keith Ahlers (Germany) Christian Bock (Germany) Erwin Derichs (Germany) Hans Georg Dornhege	Audi V8 D11	?	110
95	SP8	45	(Germany) Derichs Rennwagen	(United Kingdom) Keith Ahlers (Germany) Christian Bock (Germany) Erwin Derichs (Germany) Hans Georg Dornhege	Audi 4.2L V8	?	110
96	D3T	146	(Germany) Team RWTH Aachen University	(Germany) Thomas Hanisch (Germany) Stefan Gies (Germany) Klaus Leinfelder (Germany) Hans Keutmann	Audi A4 quattro	**D**	109
96	D3T	146	(Germany) Team RWTH Aachen University	(Germany) Thomas Hanisch (Germany) Stefan Gies (Germany) Klaus Leinfelder (Germany) Hans Keutmann	Audi TDI 3.0L Turbo V6 (Diesel)	**D**	109
97	SP4T	79	(Germany) HEICO SPORTIV	(Germany) Patrick Brenndörfer (Germany) Martin Müller (Germany) Frank Eickholt (Germany) Ulli Andree	Volvo C30 T5	**P**	109
97	SP4T	79	(Germany) HEICO SPORTIV	(Germany) Patrick Brenndörfer (Germany) Martin Müller (Germany) Frank Eickholt (Germany) Ulli Andree	Volvo T5 2.5L Turbo I5	**P**	109
98	V3	158	(Germany) Team Michael Auert	(Germany) Michael Auert (Germany) Dr. Joachim Steidel (Panama) Mike Juul (Germany) Thomas Lennackers	Opel Astra OPC	**H**	106
98	V3	158	(Germany) Team Michael Auert	(Germany) Michael Auert (Germany) Dr. Joachim Steidel (Panama) Mike Juul (Germany) Thomas Lennackers	Opel 2.0L Turbo I4	**H**	106
99	N2	191	(Norway) Team Ola Setsaas	(Norway) Ola Setsaas (Norway) Jörgen Pettersen (Norway) Mikjel Svae (Norway) Roger Sandberg	Honda Civic Type R	**D**	106
99	N2	191	(Norway) Team Ola Setsaas	(Norway) Ola Setsaas (Norway) Jörgen Pettersen (Norway) Mikjel Svae (Norway) Roger Sandberg	Honda K20A 2.0L I4	**D**	106
100	SP4T	78	(Germany) Team DMV	(Germany) Ebse Schneider (Germany) Bernd Albrecht (France) Corentine Quiniou (Germany) Michael Lachmayer	Ford Focus ST	?	105
100	SP4T	78	(Germany) Team DMV	(Germany) Ebse Schneider (Germany) Bernd Albrecht (France) Corentine Quiniou (Germany) Michael Lachmayer	Volvo T5 2.5L Turbo I5	?	105
101	AT	114	(Germany) Volkswagen Motorsport	(Germany) Dr. Ulrich Hackenberg (Germany) Bernd Ostmann (Switzerland) Peter Wyss (United Kingdom) John Barker	Volkswagen Scirocco GT24-CNG	**M**	104
101	AT	114	(Germany) Volkswagen Motorsport	(Germany) Dr. Ulrich Hackenberg (Germany) Bernd Ostmann (Switzerland) Peter Wyss (United Kingdom) John Barker	Volkswagen TSI 2.0L Turbo I4	**M**	104
102	V5	168	(Germany) RD Motorsport	(Norway) Einar Thorsen (United Kingdom) Meyrick Cox (Germany) David Ackermann (Germany) Oliver Luisoder	BMW M3 E36	?	103
102	V5	168	(Germany) RD Motorsport	(Norway) Einar Thorsen (United Kingdom) Meyrick Cox (Germany) David Ackermann (Germany) Oliver Luisoder	BMW S50 3.0L I6	?	103
103	V4	166	(Germany) Greenhell Racing Team	(Germany) Stefan Manheller (Argentina) Jose Manuel Balbiani (Argentina) Jose Visir (Germany) Franz-Hajo Müller	BMW E36	**K**	103
103	V4	166	(Germany) Greenhell Racing Team	(Germany) Stefan Manheller (Argentina) Jose Manuel Balbiani (Argentina) Jose Visir (Germany) Franz-Hajo Müller	BMW 2.5L I6	**K**	103
104	SP3	104	(Germany) Mathol Racing	(Germany) Wolfgang Weber (Germany) Norbert Bermes (Germany) Matthias Holle (Germany) Uwe Nittel	Honda S2000 GT	**BF**	102
104	SP3	104	(Germany) Mathol Racing	(Germany) Wolfgang Weber (Germany) Norbert Bermes (Germany) Matthias Holle (Germany) Uwe Nittel	Honda F22C1 2.0L I4	**BF**	102
105	SP3	13	(Australia) Osborne Motorsport	(Australia) Colin Osborne (Australia) Stuart Jones	Toyota Corolla E120	**Y**	102
105	SP3	13	(Australia) Osborne Motorsport	(Australia) Colin Osborne (Australia) Stuart Jones	Toyota 2ZZ-GE 1.8L I4	**Y**	102
106	SP9; GT3	25	(Germany) Alpina	(Austria) Johannes Stuck (Germany) Michael Rebhan (Germany) Ralf Schall (Germany) Marcel Engels	BMW Alpina B6 GT3	**M**	102
106	SP9; GT3	25	(Germany) Alpina	(Austria) Johannes Stuck (Germany) Michael Rebhan (Germany) Ralf Schall (Germany) Marcel Engels	BMW N62 4.4L S/C V8	**M**	102
107	SP3	101	(Germany) Mathol Racing	(Switzerland) Rüdiger Schicht (Japan) Hisanao Kurata (Bahrain) Sheik Ali bin Jaber al Khalifa (Germany) Michael Prym	Honda Civic Type R	**BF**	102
107	SP3	101	(Germany) Mathol Racing	(Switzerland) Rüdiger Schicht (Japan) Hisanao Kurata (Bahrain) Sheik Ali bin Jaber al Khalifa (Germany) Michael Prym	Honda K20Z4 2.0L I4	**BF**	102
108	SP3	105	(Germany) Automobilclub von Deutschland	(Germany) Daniela Schmidt (Germany) Anja Wassertheurer (Germany) Nicole Müllenmeister (Germany) Stefan Schlesack	Honda Civic Type R	**BF**	101
108	SP3	105	(Germany) Automobilclub von Deutschland	(Germany) Daniela Schmidt (Germany) Anja Wassertheurer (Germany) Nicole Müllenmeister (Germany) Stefan Schlesack	Honda K20Z4 2.0L I4	**BF**	101
109	SP5	68	(Germany) Dörr Motorsport	(Germany) Michael Holz (Germany) Tom Robson (Germany) Simon Englerth (Germany) Christian Wack	BMW 130i	**P**	99
109	SP5	68	(Germany) Dörr Motorsport	(Germany) Michael Holz (Germany) Tom Robson (Germany) Simon Englerth (Germany) Christian Wack	BMW N52 3.0L I6	**P**	99
110	D3T	145	(Germany) Team Andre Ibron	(Germany) Andre Ibron (Germany) Thomas Laudage (Germany) Zoran Radulovic (Greece) Athanasios Karageorgos	BMW 135d Coupe	**D**	95
110	D3T	145	(Germany) Team Andre Ibron	(Germany) Andre Ibron (Germany) Thomas Laudage (Germany) Zoran Radulovic (Greece) Athanasios Karageorgos	BMW M57 3.0L Turbo I6 (Diesel)	**D**	95
111	SP7	41	(France) Team Segolen	(France) "Segolen" (France) Gerard Tremblay (France) Eric van de Vyver	Porsche 993 Cup	**M**	94
111	SP7	41	(France) Team Segolen	(France) "Segolen" (France) Gerard Tremblay (France) Eric van de Vyver	Porsche 3.8L Flat-6	**M**	94
112	SP5	70	(Germany) Team Frank Nöhring	(Germany) Frank Nöhring (United Kingdom) Colin White (Germany) Lasse Osterild	BMW M3 E46	?	90
112	SP5	70	(Germany) Team Frank Nöhring	(Germany) Frank Nöhring (United Kingdom) Colin White (Germany) Lasse Osterild	BMW 3.0L I6	?	90
113	SP6	39	(United Kingdom) RJN Motorsport	(Germany) Holger Eckhardt (Denmark) Kurt Thiim (United Kingdom) Alex Buncombe (Germany) Matthias Malmedie	Nissan 370Z	**D**	89
113	SP6	39	(United Kingdom) RJN Motorsport	(Germany) Holger Eckhardt (Denmark) Kurt Thiim (United Kingdom) Alex Buncombe (Germany) Matthias Malmedie	Nissan VQ35HR 3.5L V6	**D**	89
114	SP10; GT4	73	(Italy) Lanza Motorsport	(Italy) Arturo Merzario (Italy) Mauro Simoncini (Italy) Dr. Sergio Negroni (Italy) Alexander Bolognesi	Nissan 350Z	?	89
114	SP10; GT4	73	(Italy) Lanza Motorsport	(Italy) Arturo Merzario (Italy) Mauro Simoncini (Italy) Dr. Sergio Negroni (Italy) Alexander Bolognesi	Nissan VQ35HR 3.5L V6	?	89
115	SP3	126	(Germany) Team DMV	(Germany) Hans-Christoph Schäfer (Germany) Ralf Udo Blöding (Germany) Daniel Weckop (Germany) Dr. Michael Albertz	SEAT Ibiza 6K	?	88
115	SP3	126	(Germany) Team DMV	(Germany) Hans-Christoph Schäfer (Germany) Ralf Udo Blöding (Germany) Daniel Weckop (Germany) Dr. Michael Albertz	SEAT 1.8L I4	?	88
116	D1T	132	(Germany) Team Bernd Kleeschulte	(Germany) Bernd Kleeschulte (Germany) Gustav Edelhoff (Germany) Uwe Bergstermann (Germany) Alexander Streit	BMW 320d Raps	?	87
116	D1T	132	(Germany) Team Bernd Kleeschulte	(Germany) Bernd Kleeschulte (Germany) Gustav Edelhoff (Germany) Uwe Bergstermann (Germany) Alexander Streit	BMW M47 2.0L Turbo I4 (Diesel)	?	87
117	SP3T	112	(Germany) Power Racing	(Germany) Christian Bollrath (Germany) Jens Richter (Liechtenstein) Johann Wanger (Germany) Timo Leto	SEAT León Supercopa	?	82
117	SP3T	112	(Germany) Power Racing	(Germany) Christian Bollrath (Germany) Jens Richter (Liechtenstein) Johann Wanger (Germany) Timo Leto	SEAT (Volkswagen) TFSI 2.0L Turbo I4	?	82
118	D1T	135	(Germany) Dörr Motorsport	(Germany) Heiko Hahn (Germany) Kristian Vetter (Germany) Frank Weishar (Germany) Tom Moran	BMW 120d	**P**	81
118	D1T	135	(Germany) Dörr Motorsport	(Germany) Heiko Hahn (Germany) Kristian Vetter (Germany) Frank Weishar (Germany) Tom Moran	BMW M47 2.0L Turbo I4 (Diesel)	**P**	81
DNF	SP9; GT3	19	(Germany) Mamerow Racing	(Germany) Christian Mamerow (Germany) Jörg Bergmeister (United Kingdom) Marino Franchitti (Germany) Peter Mamerow	Porsche 997 GT3 Cup S	**Y**	131
DNF	SP9; GT3	19	(Germany) Mamerow Racing	(Germany) Christian Mamerow (Germany) Jörg Bergmeister (United Kingdom) Marino Franchitti (Germany) Peter Mamerow	Porsche 3.8 L Flat-6	**Y**	131
DNF	SP9; GT3	21	(Germany) Vulkan Racing-Team Mingten Motorsport	(Germany) Dirk Riebensahm (Germany) Christian Kohlhaas (Germany) Christopher Gerhard	Dodge Viper Competition Coupe	**M**	114
DNF	SP9; GT3	21	(Germany) Vulkan Racing-Team Mingten Motorsport	(Germany) Dirk Riebensahm (Germany) Christian Kohlhaas (Germany) Christopher Gerhard	Dodge 8.3L V10	**M**	114
DNF	SP7	22	(Germany) Scuderia Colonia	(Germany) Andreas Sczepansky (Germany) Georges Kuhn (Germany) Matthias Wasel (Germany) Thomas Wasel	Porsche 964 RS	?	108
DNF	SP7	22	(Germany) Scuderia Colonia	(Germany) Andreas Sczepansky (Germany) Georges Kuhn (Germany) Matthias Wasel (Germany) Thomas Wasel	Porsche 3.6L Flat-6	?	108
DNF	SP8	15	(Japan) Gazoo Racing	(Germany) Armin Hahne (Germany) Jochen Krumbach (Germany) André Lotterer (Japan) Hiromu Naruse	Lexus LF-A	**B**	106
DNF	SP8	15	(Japan) Gazoo Racing	(Germany) Armin Hahne (Germany) Jochen Krumbach (Germany) André Lotterer (Japan) Hiromu Naruse	Lexus 4.8L V10	**B**	106
DNF	V4	165	(Germany) Dürener Motorsport	(Germany) Bernd Küpper (Germany) Benjamin Weidner (Germany) Jochen Hudelmaier (Germany) "Rennsemmel"	BMW 325	**Y**	101
DNF	V4	165	(Germany) Dürener Motorsport	(Germany) Bernd Küpper (Germany) Benjamin Weidner (Germany) Jochen Hudelmaier (Germany) "Rennsemmel"	BMW M50 2.5L I6	**Y**	101
DNF	SP3T	117	(Germany) Volkswagen Motorsport	(Spain) Carlos Sainz (Germany) Patrick Simon (Germany) Dieter Depping (Germany) Wolfgang Kaufmann	Volkswagen Scirocco GT24	**M**	100
DNF	SP3T	117	(Germany) Volkswagen Motorsport	(Spain) Carlos Sainz (Germany) Patrick Simon (Germany) Dieter Depping (Germany) Wolfgang Kaufmann	Volkswagen TSI 2.0L Turbo I4	**M**	100
DNF	SP7	6	(Germany) Hankook-H&R Spezialfedern	(Germany) Jürgen Alzen (Germany) Christian Menzel (Germany) Dominik Schwager (Germany) Florian Fricke	Porsche 997 GT3	**H**	98
DNF	SP7	6	(Germany) Hankook-H&R Spezialfedern	(Germany) Jürgen Alzen (Germany) Christian Menzel (Germany) Dominik Schwager (Germany) Florian Fricke	Porsche 3.6L Flat-6	**H**	98
DNF	SP6	55	(Germany) Brückner Motorsport (Germany) Carlsson Motorsport	(Germany) Wolfgang Kudrass (Japan) Yasushi Kikushi (United Kingdom) Peter Cate (United Kingdom) Peter Venn	Carlsson CK35 RS	**D**	95
DNF	SP6	55	(Germany) Brückner Motorsport (Germany) Carlsson Motorsport	(Germany) Wolfgang Kudrass (Japan) Yasushi Kikushi (United Kingdom) Peter Cate (United Kingdom) Peter Venn	Mercedes-Benz M272 3.5L V6	**D**	95
DNF	V6	183	(Germany) Besaplast Team	(Germany) Jörg Wiskirchen (Germany) Carsten Welschar (Germany) Klaus Koch (Germany) Jens Riemer	BMW M3 E46	**Y**	94
DNF	V6	183	(Germany) Besaplast Team	(Germany) Jörg Wiskirchen (Germany) Carsten Welschar (Germany) Klaus Koch (Germany) Jens Riemer	BMW S54 3.2L I6	**Y**	94
DNF	SP5	80	(Germany) Live-Strip.com Racing	(Germany) Rudi Seher (Germany) Karlheinz Grüner (Germany) Jens Strack (Germany) Kristian Nägele	BMW 330i	**A**	92
DNF	SP5	80	(Germany) Live-Strip.com Racing	(Germany) Rudi Seher (Germany) Karlheinz Grüner (Germany) Jens Strack (Germany) Kristian Nägele	BMW N54 3.0L I6	**A**	92
DNF	SP5	56	(France) GPE	(France) Daniel Dupont (France) Alain Giavedoni (France) Patrick Ancelet	Porsche 968	**M**	92
DNF	SP5	56	(France) GPE	(France) Daniel Dupont (France) Alain Giavedoni (France) Patrick Ancelet	Porsche 3.0L I4	**M**	92
DNF	SP5	59	(Germany) Team Hans-Rolf Salzer	(Germany) Hans-Rolf Salzer (Germany) Sascha Salzer (Germany) Tjark Schäfer	BMW M3 E36	**D**	89
DNF	SP5	59	(Germany) Team Hans-Rolf Salzer	(Germany) Hans-Rolf Salzer (Germany) Sascha Salzer (Germany) Tjark Schäfer	BMW S50 3.0L I6	**D**	89
DNF	SP9; GT3	40	(Germany) Raeder Automotive	(Germany) Hermann Tilke (Germany) Dirk Adorf (Germany) Marc Hennerici (Germany) Thomas Mutsch	Ford GT GT3	**D**	82
DNF	SP9; GT3	40	(Germany) Raeder Automotive	(Germany) Hermann Tilke (Germany) Dirk Adorf (Germany) Marc Hennerici (Germany) Thomas Mutsch	Ford 5.4L S/C V8	**D**	82
DNF	SP7	10	(Germany) MSC Adenau	(Germany) Jörg Viebahn (Australia) Rodney Forbes (Netherlands) Duncan Huisman (Germany) Marko Hartung	BMW E46 M3 GTS	**Y**	77
DNF	SP7	10	(Germany) MSC Adenau	(Germany) Jörg Viebahn (Australia) Rodney Forbes (Netherlands) Duncan Huisman (Germany) Marko Hartung	BMW 4.0L V8	**Y**	77
DNF	SP8	12	(Germany) Kissling Motorsport	(Germany) Reinhold Renger (Germany) Roland Rehfeld (Germany) Stefan Kissling (Germany) Volker Strycek	Chevrolet Corvette C6	**BF**	77
DNF	SP8	12	(Germany) Kissling Motorsport	(Germany) Reinhold Renger (Germany) Roland Rehfeld (Germany) Stefan Kissling (Germany) Volker Strycek	Chevrolet LS3 6.2L V8	**BF**	77
DNF	SP3T	92	(Germany) Pro Sport Racing	(Sweden) Andres Carlsson (Germany) Oliver Pelz (Andorra) Ed Nicelife	SEAT León Mk1	**Y**	74
DNF	SP3T	92	(Germany) Pro Sport Racing	(Sweden) Andres Carlsson (Germany) Oliver Pelz (Andorra) Ed Nicelife	SEAT (Volkswagen) 1.8L Turbo I4	**Y**	74
NC	SP3T	87	(Italy) Costa Ovest Promotorsport	(Italy) Umberto Nacamuli (Italy) Piero Limonta (Italy) Gianni Checcoli (Italy) Riccardo Meloni	SEAT León	**D**	74
NC	SP3T	87	(Italy) Costa Ovest Promotorsport	(Italy) Umberto Nacamuli (Italy) Piero Limonta (Italy) Gianni Checcoli (Italy) Riccardo Meloni	SEAT (Volkswagen) TFSI 2.0L Turbo I4	**D**	74
DNF	D1T	141	(Netherlands) Team Ivo Breukers	(Netherlands) Ivo Breukers (Netherlands) Henk Thijssen (Netherlands) Bernd van Berkel	SEAT León TDI	**T**	72
DNF	D1T	141	(Netherlands) Team Ivo Breukers	(Netherlands) Ivo Breukers (Netherlands) Henk Thijssen (Netherlands) Bernd van Berkel	SEAT (Volkswagen) TDI 2.0L Turbo I4 (Diesel)	**T**	72
NC	SP3	110	(Norway) Team Bjarne Nordal	(Norway) Bjarne Nordal (Norway) Inge Mauseth (Norway) Bjorn Vidar Brynildsen	Peugeot 206	?	72
NC	SP3	110	(Norway) Team Bjarne Nordal	(Norway) Bjarne Nordal (Norway) Inge Mauseth (Norway) Bjorn Vidar Brynildsen	Peugeot 2.0L I4	?	72
NC	SP3	109	(Germany) MSC Langenfeld	(Germany) Karl Pflanz (Germany) Torsten Platz (Germany) Steffen Wethmar (Luxembourg) Charles Kauffmann	Honda S2000	**M**	71
NC	SP3	109	(Germany) MSC Langenfeld	(Germany) Karl Pflanz (Germany) Torsten Platz (Germany) Steffen Wethmar (Luxembourg) Charles Kauffmann	Honda F20C 2.0L I4	**M**	71
DNF	SP9; GT3	35	(Germany) Besaplast Racing Team	(Germany) Martin Tschornia (Germany) Franjo Kovac (Germany) Sebastian Asch (Germany) Arno Klasen	Porsche 997 GT3 Cup	?	70
DNF	SP9; GT3	35	(Germany) Besaplast Racing Team	(Germany) Martin Tschornia (Germany) Franjo Kovac (Germany) Sebastian Asch (Germany) Arno Klasen	Porsche 3.6L Flat-6	?	70
DNF	SP3	106	(Germany) Team Andreas Dingert	(Germany) Andreas Dingert (Germany) Eric Freichels (Germany) Sven Kurtenbach (Germany) Franz Hasenstab	Volkswagen Golf Mk3	**H**	68
DNF	SP3	106	(Germany) Team Andreas Dingert	(Germany) Andreas Dingert (Germany) Eric Freichels (Germany) Sven Kurtenbach (Germany) Franz Hasenstab	Volkswagen 2.0L I4	**H**	68
DNF	SP3T	90	(Germany) Pro Sport Racing	(Germany) Thomas Koll (Germany) Bora Bölck (Germany) Stefan Michels (Germany) Marc Viebahn	Audi TT	**Y**	66
DNF	SP3T	90	(Germany) Pro Sport Racing	(Germany) Thomas Koll (Germany) Bora Bölck (Germany) Stefan Michels (Germany) Marc Viebahn	Audi 1.8L Turbo I4	**Y**	66
DNF	SP9; GT3	94	(Germany) Scuderia Offenbach	(Germany) Andreas Weiland (Germany) Guido Wirtz (Indonesia) Algadri Maher (Germany) Leonhard Schiller	Porsche 997	**M**	64
DNF	SP9; GT3	94	(Germany) Scuderia Offenbach	(Germany) Andreas Weiland (Germany) Guido Wirtz (Indonesia) Algadri Maher (Germany) Leonhard Schiller	Porsche 3.6L Flat-6	**M**	64
NC	SP8	44	(Australia) Team Mal Rose	(Australia) Mal Rose (Australia) Peter Leenhuis (Australia) Tony Alford	Holden VY Commodore	**M**	64
NC	SP8	44	(Australia) Team Mal Rose	(Australia) Mal Rose (Australia) Peter Leenhuis (Australia) Tony Alford	Holden 5.0L V8	**M**	64
DNF	SP3T	84	(Germany) ADAC Nordbaden	(Germany) Rudolf Brandl (Germany) Torsten Kratz (Germany) Bela Molnar (Germany) Wolf-Dieter Ihle	Audi TTS	**Y**	59
DNF	SP3T	84	(Germany) ADAC Nordbaden	(Germany) Rudolf Brandl (Germany) Torsten Kratz (Germany) Bela Molnar (Germany) Wolf-Dieter Ihle	Audi TFSI 2.0L Turbo I4	**Y**	59
DNF	SP3T	88	(Norway) Team Hakon Schjaerin	(Norway) Hakon Schjaerin (Norway) Atle Gulbrandsen (Germany) Peter Oberndorfer	Audi TT	**C**	59
DNF	SP3T	88	(Norway) Team Hakon Schjaerin	(Norway) Hakon Schjaerin (Norway) Atle Gulbrandsen (Germany) Peter Oberndorfer	Audi TFSI 2.0L Turbo I4	**C**	59
DNF	V6	185	(Germany) MSC Odenkirchen	(Germany) Alex Duffner (Germany) Manuel Paßberger (Germany) Jochen Vollmer (Germany) Frank Genbrock	BMW M3 E46	**D**	59
DNF	V6	185	(Germany) MSC Odenkirchen	(Germany) Alex Duffner (Germany) Manuel Paßberger (Germany) Jochen Vollmer (Germany) Frank Genbrock	BMW S54 3.2L I6	**D**	59
DNF	D3T	147	(Germany) AC Bergisch-Land	(Switzerland) Jan Ullrich (Germany) Dr. Thomas Stoltz (Germany) Mike Kluge (Germany) Harald Becker	BMW 335d GTR	?	55
DNF	D3T	147	(Germany) AC Bergisch-Land	(Switzerland) Jan Ullrich (Germany) Dr. Thomas Stoltz (Germany) Mike Kluge (Germany) Harald Becker	BMW 3.0L Turbo I6 (Diesel)	?	55
DNF	SP7	5	(Germany) Wochenspiegel Team Manthey	(Germany) Georg Weiss (Germany) Peter-Paul Pietsch (Germany) Michael Jacobs (Austria) Martin Ragginger	Porsche 997 GT3	**M**	55
DNF	SP7	5	(Germany) Wochenspiegel Team Manthey	(Germany) Georg Weiss (Germany) Peter-Paul Pietsch (Germany) Michael Jacobs (Austria) Martin Ragginger	Porsche 3.6L Flat-6	**M**	55
DNF	D1T	139	(Germany) Motorsport Arena Oschersleben	(Germany) Peter Posavac (Sweden) Lars Stugemo (Germany) Marko Hartung (United Kingdom) Paul Spooner	BMW E90 320d	**D**	53
DNF	D1T	139	(Germany) Motorsport Arena Oschersleben	(Germany) Peter Posavac (Sweden) Lars Stugemo (Germany) Marko Hartung (United Kingdom) Paul Spooner	BMW 2.0L Turbo I4 (Diesel)	**D**	53
DNF	SP7	31	(Germany) MSPEED	(Germany) Dr. Stefan Beil (Germany) Norbert Fischer (Germany) Marco Seefried (Netherlands) Tom Coronel	Porsche 997	**Y**	52
DNF	SP7	31	(Germany) MSPEED	(Germany) Dr. Stefan Beil (Germany) Norbert Fischer (Germany) Marco Seefried (Netherlands) Tom Coronel	Porsche 3.6L Flat-6	**Y**	52
DNF	SP4T	62	(Germany) Herrmann Racing	(Germany) Björn Herrmann (Germany) Christian Steffens (Germany) Frank Döring (Germany) Marcus Kroll	Ford Focus	**Y**	51
DNF	SP4T	62	(Germany) Herrmann Racing	(Germany) Björn Herrmann (Germany) Christian Steffens (Germany) Frank Döring (Germany) Marcus Kroll	Ford 2.4L Turbo I5	**Y**	51
DNF	SP3	108	(Germany) MSC Langenfeld	(Luxembourg) Joe Schmitz (Germany) Walter Nawotka (Germany) Gerd Grundmann (Switzerland) Dieter Svepes	Honda S2000	**M**	50
DNF	SP3	108	(Germany) MSC Langenfeld	(Luxembourg) Joe Schmitz (Germany) Walter Nawotka (Germany) Gerd Grundmann (Switzerland) Dieter Svepes	Honda F20C 2.0L I4	**M**	50
DNF	SP7	32	(Sweden) Hankook-Levin Racing Team	(Sweden) Anders Levin (Sweden) Martin Morin (Sweden) Carl Rydquist (Sweden) Peter Thelin	Porsche 996 RSR	**H**	48
DNF	SP7	32	(Sweden) Hankook-Levin Racing Team	(Sweden) Anders Levin (Sweden) Martin Morin (Sweden) Carl Rydquist (Sweden) Peter Thelin	Porsche 3.8L Flat-6	**H**	48
DNF	SP5	67	(Ukraine) Team Oleksiy Kikireshko	(Ukraine) Oleksiy Kikireshko (Ukraine) Andrii Onistrat (Germany) Ralf Wagner (Ukraine) Valeriy Gorban	BMW E46 M3	?	47
DNF	SP5	67	(Ukraine) Team Oleksiy Kikireshko	(Ukraine) Oleksiy Kikireshko (Ukraine) Andrii Onistrat (Germany) Ralf Wagner (Ukraine) Valeriy Gorban	BMW 3.0L I6	?	47
DNF	SP4T	75	(Germany) MSC Adenau	(Germany) Stephan Wölflich (Germany) Urs Bressan (Germany) Michael Klein (Germany) Tim Scheerbarth	Ford Mondeo	**M**	40
DNF	SP4T	75	(Germany) MSC Adenau	(Germany) Stephan Wölflich (Germany) Urs Bressan (Germany) Michael Klein (Germany) Tim Scheerbarth	Ford 2.5L Turbo I5	**M**	40
DNF	SP6	77	(Germany) Motorsport Arena Oschersleben	(Germany) Claudia Hürtgen (Brazil) Augusto Farfus (Norway) Stian Sorlie (Germany) Dirk Müller	BMW Z4 M Coupe	**D**	38
DNF	SP6	77	(Germany) Motorsport Arena Oschersleben	(Germany) Claudia Hürtgen (Brazil) Augusto Farfus (Norway) Stian Sorlie (Germany) Dirk Müller	BMW S54 3.2L I6	**D**	38
DNF	SP10; GT4	72	(Switzerland) Gentle Swiss Racing	(Switzerland) Fredy Barth (Germany) Manuel Lauck (Germany) Adam Osieka (Germany) Nicole Lüttecke	Aston Martin V8 Vantage N24	**P**	38
DNF	SP10; GT4	72	(Switzerland) Gentle Swiss Racing	(Switzerland) Fredy Barth (Germany) Manuel Lauck (Germany) Adam Osieka (Germany) Nicole Lüttecke	Aston Martin 4.3L V8	**P**	38
DNF	SP4	74	(Germany) Team Thorsten Stadler	(Germany) Thorsten Stadler (Germany) Sebastian Sauerbrei (Germany) Ernst Sinowzik	Mercedes-Benz 190E 2.5–16 Evo II	?	34
DNF	SP4	74	(Germany) Team Thorsten Stadler	(Germany) Thorsten Stadler (Germany) Sebastian Sauerbrei (Germany) Ernst Sinowzik	Mercedes-Benz (Cosworth) M102 2.5L I4	?	34
DNF	D1T	133	(Germany) Bergischer Motor-Club	(Germany) Frank Hiersekorn (Germany) Ralf Bettendorf (Germany) Stefan Schlünder (United Kingdom) Lloyd Allard	Volkswagen Golf Mk4 TDI	?	33
DNF	D1T	133	(Germany) Bergischer Motor-Club	(Germany) Frank Hiersekorn (Germany) Ralf Bettendorf (Germany) Stefan Schlünder (United Kingdom) Lloyd Allard	Volkswagen TDI 1.9L Turbo I4 (Diesel)	?	33
DNF	SP3	111	(Germany) Hengel Competition	(France) Fabrice Reicher (France) René Wolff (Switzerland) Pascal Engel (Germany) Harald Rettich	Peugeot 206 RCC	?	31
DNF	SP3	111	(Germany) Hengel Competition	(France) Fabrice Reicher (France) René Wolff (Switzerland) Pascal Engel (Germany) Harald Rettich	Peugeot EW10J4 2.0L I4	?	31
DNF	SP3T	85	(Germany) Team ROWE Motorsport	(Germany) Franz Rohr (Germany) Michael Zehe (Germany) Werner Kather (Germany) Gerhard Ludwig	Audi TT	**D**	29
DNF	SP3T	85	(Germany) Team ROWE Motorsport	(Germany) Franz Rohr (Germany) Michael Zehe (Germany) Werner Kather (Germany) Gerhard Ludwig	Audi TFSI 2.0L Turbo I4	**D**	29
DNF	SP6	47	(Germany) Team Heinz Schmersal	(Germany) Heinz Schmersal (Germany) Christoph Koslowski (Germany) Stephan Rösler (Germany) Mike Stursberg	BMW Z4 M Coupe	**D**	23
DNF	SP6	47	(Germany) Team Heinz Schmersal	(Germany) Heinz Schmersal (Germany) Christoph Koslowski (Germany) Stephan Rösler (Germany) Mike Stursberg	BMW S54 3.2L I6	**D**	23
DNF	SP6	51	(Germany) Bonk Motorsport	(Germany) Wolf Silvester (Germany) Michael Bonk (Switzerland) Fabian Sigward (Hong Kong) Matthew Marsh	Porsche 996 GT3 Cup	**Y**	18
DNF	SP6	51	(Germany) Bonk Motorsport	(Germany) Wolf Silvester (Germany) Michael Bonk (Switzerland) Fabian Sigward (Hong Kong) Matthew Marsh	Porsche 3.5L Flat-6	**Y**	18
DNF	SP7	50	(Germany) Team Heribert Steiner	(Germany) Heribert Steiner (Australia) Damian Flack (Germany) Valentin Hummel (Germany) Michael Funke	BMW E92 BMW M3 GTR	**P**	16
DNF	SP7	50	(Germany) Team Heribert Steiner	(Germany) Heribert Steiner (Australia) Damian Flack (Germany) Valentin Hummel (Germany) Michael Funke	BMW 4.0L V8	**P**	16
DNF	SP3	120	(Germany) Kissling Motorsport	(Germany) Hans-Olaf Beckmann (Germany) Volker Strycek (Germany) Peter Hass (Germany) Ralf Schall	Opel Manta	**Y**	15
DNF	SP3	120	(Germany) Kissling Motorsport	(Germany) Hans-Olaf Beckmann (Germany) Volker Strycek (Germany) Peter Hass (Germany) Ralf Schall	Opel 2.0L I4	**Y**	15
DNF	SP6	46	(Germany) Team Tobias Schulze	(Germany) Tobias Schulze (Germany) Michael Schulze (Germany) Martin Scheel (Germany) Meik Utsch	Nissan 350Z	**M**	11
DNF	SP6	46	(Germany) Team Tobias Schulze	(Germany) Tobias Schulze (Germany) Michael Schulze (Germany) Martin Scheel (Germany) Meik Utsch	Nissan VQ35HR 3.5L V6	**M**	11
DNF	SP7	30	(Germany) Team Kersten Jodexnis	(Germany) Kersten Jodexnis (Germany) Wolfgang Destdrée (Germany) Kai Riemer (Germany) Nils Bartels	Porsche 997 RSR	?	9
DNF	SP7	30	(Germany) Team Kersten Jodexnis	(Germany) Kersten Jodexnis (Germany) Wolfgang Destdrée (Germany) Kai Riemer (Germany) Nils Bartels	Porsche 3.8L Flat-6	?	9
DNF	V5	174	(Germany) ADAC Ostwestfalen-Lippe	(Germany) Dominik Thiemann (Sweden) Allan Runnegard (Germany) Kim Berwanger (Germany) Thomas Frank	BMW E36 M3 GT	?	5
DNF	V5	174	(Germany) ADAC Ostwestfalen-Lippe	(Germany) Dominik Thiemann (Sweden) Allan Runnegard (Germany) Kim Berwanger (Germany) Thomas Frank	BMW 3.0L I6	?	5
DNF	SP5	66	(Germany) Team-Schrick.com	(Germany) Tim Schrick (Germany) Jörg van Ommen (Germany) Jan-Erik Slooten (Liechtenstein) Ruben Zeltner	Aston Martin V8 Vantage	?	0
DNF	SP5	66	(Germany) Team-Schrick.com	(Germany) Tim Schrick (Germany) Jörg van Ommen (Germany) Jan-Erik Slooten (Liechtenstein) Ruben Zeltner	Aston Martin 3.0L V8	?	0
DNF	SP3T	128	(Germany) Schirra-Motoring	(Germany) Friederich Halbach von Bohlen (Germany) Markus Oestreich (Germany) Harald Grohs (Germany) Michael Hess	Mini Cooper	**D**	0
DNF	SP3T	128	(Germany) Schirra-Motoring	(Germany) Friederich Halbach von Bohlen (Germany) Markus Oestreich (Germany) Harald Grohs (Germany) Michael Hess	BMW 1.6L S/C I4	**D**	0

== Bibliography ==
- Jörg-Richard Ufer & Tim Upietz. 24 Stunden Nürburgring Nordschleife 2009 (in German). Gruppe C Motorsport Verlag. ISBN 978-3-928540-58-2.
