= Sartorius AG =

German laboratory equipment company

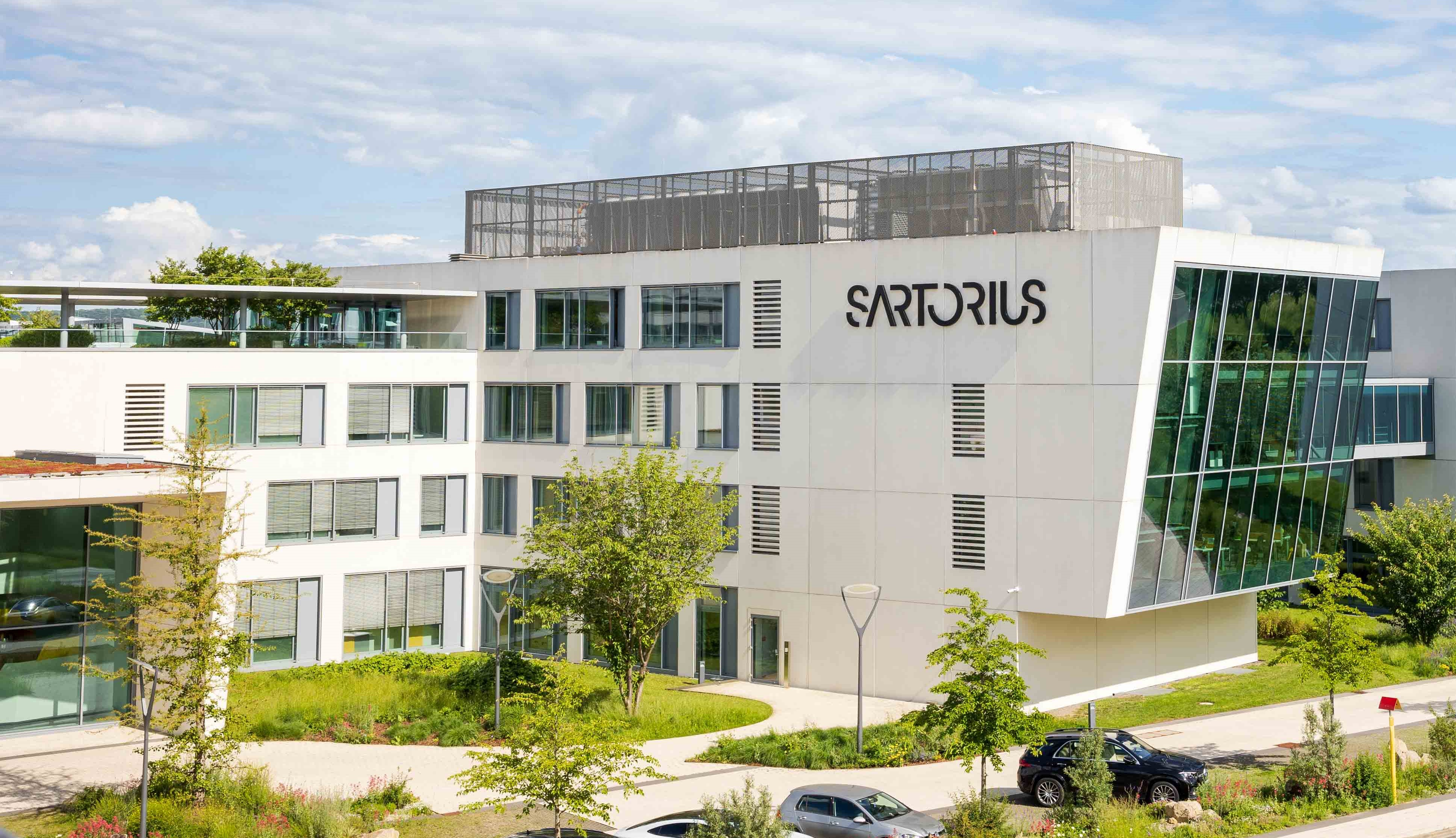
- Sartorius Campus, headquarters in Göttingen
- Type: Aktiengesellschaft
- Traded as: FWB: SRT; FWB: SRT3; FWB: SRT0 (ADR); FWB: SRT4 (ADR); Euronext Paris: DIM; OTCID Basic Current: SARTF; OTCID Basic Current: SUVPF; OTCID Basic Limited: SSSGY (ADR); OTCID Basic Limited: SOAGY (ADR); LSE: 0NIQ; LSE: 0NIR; DAX component (SRT3); CAC Next 20 component (DIM)
- ISIN: DE0007165607; DE0007165631; FR0013154002; US80385Q2084; US80385Q1094
- Industry: Pharmaceutical and Laboratory Equipment
- Founded: 1870; 156 years ago Göttingen, Germany
- Founder: Florenz Sartorius
- Headquarters: Göttingen, Germany
- Area served: Worldwide
- Key people: Michael Grosse (CEO & Executive Board Chair); René Fáber (Executive Board Member); Alexandra Gatzemeyer (Executive Board Member); Florian Funck (CFO)
- Revenue: ▲€3.5381 billion (2025)
- Number of employees: ▲14,042 (2025)

Sartorius AG is an international supplier of pharmaceutical and laboratory equipment. Founded in 1870, the company is headquartered in Göttingen, Germany. It provides tools and services for the biopharmaceutical industry. The company operates through two divisions: Bioprocess Solutions and Lab Products & Services.

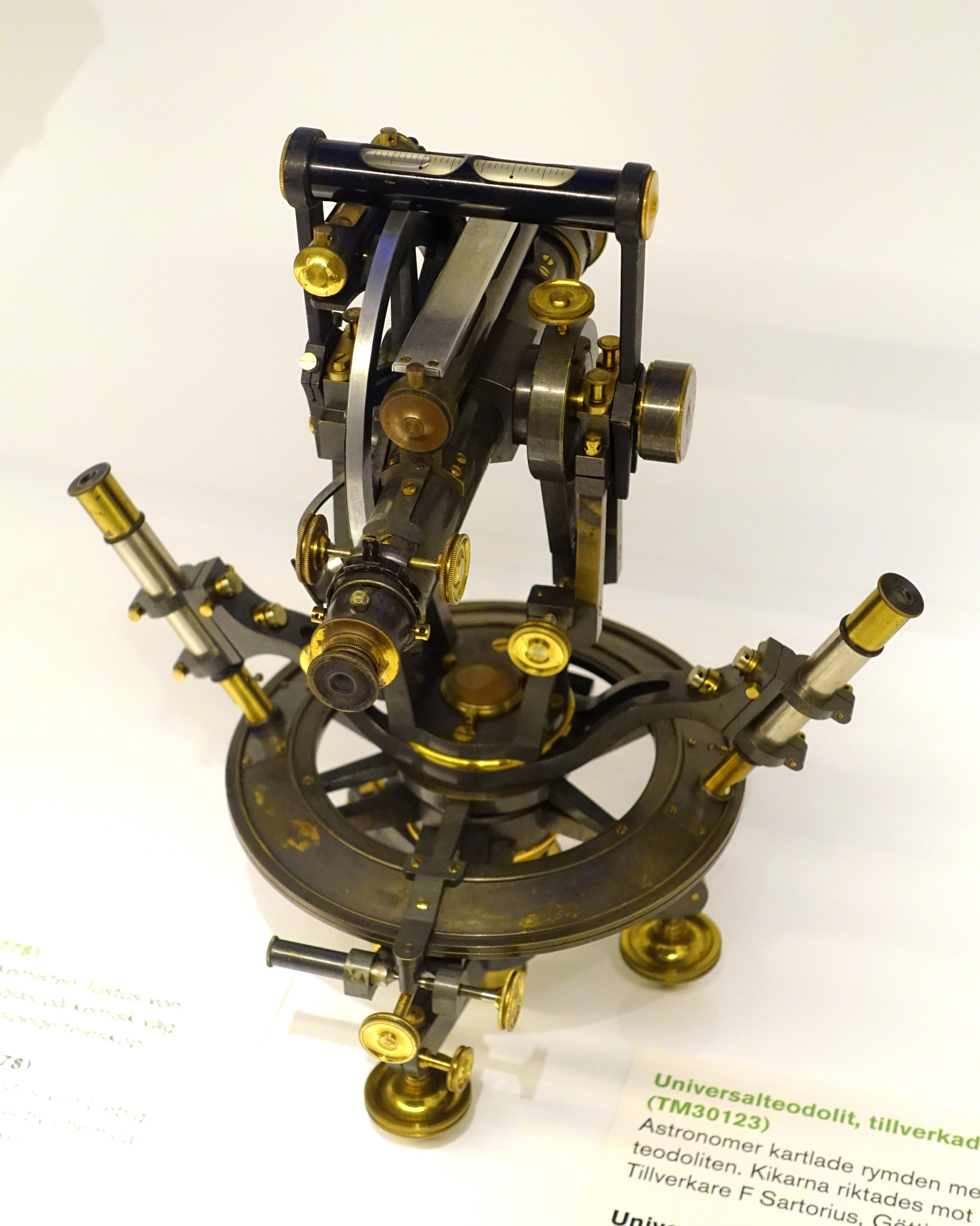
Universal theodolite made by Florenz Sartorius, c. 1910

== History ==
In 1870, Florenz Sartorius founded the Feinmechanische Werkstatt F. Sartorius in Göttingen at the age of 24, following the development of a short-beam analytical balance. The invention gained international recognition, and the 3,000th balance was produced in 1895. Over time, the mechanical workshop developed into a medium-sized company.

In 1906, Sartorius expanded its product portfolio through the acquisition of August Becker (Göttingen) and Ludwig Tesdorpf (Stuttgart). These companies manufactured microtomes, as well as astronomical, geodetic, and physical instruments.

In 1969, Sartorius equipment was used to test lunar samples collected during the Apollo 11 mission.

== Recent history (since 2000) ==
In 2000, Sartorius acquired B. Braun Biotech International (BBI) from B. Braun Melsungen AG. At the time, BBI was a leading manufacturer of fermenters (bioreactors) and cell culture systems. The company was integrated into the Sartorius Group as Sartorius Stedim Systems GmbH (formerly Sartorius BBI Systems GmbH), a subsidiary of Sartorius Stedim Biotech GmbH.

Sartorius AG subsequently acquired the remaining shares in Viva Science, becoming the sole owner of the company.

In 2005, Sartorius acquired 100 percent of the shares of Omnimark Instrument Corporation, based in Arizona, United States. Omnimark manufactures moisture analyzers.

In 2007, Sartorius merged its biotechnology division with the French biotechnology company Stedim S.A. The resulting entity, Sartorius Stedim Biotech (SSB), is listed on the Paris Stock Exchange.

That same year, Sartorius acquired Toha Plast GmbH, which now operates under the name Sartorius Stedim Plastics.

In 2008, through its subgroup Sartorius Stedim Biotech, the company acquired Swiss-based Wave Biotech AG, a provider of single-use bioreactors.

In 2011, Sartorius acquired the liquid handling business of the Finnish laboratory equipment manufacturer Biohit. This acquisition expanded the company's portfolio of laboratory instruments.

In 2013, a new production building for injection moulding of plastic parts was opened in Göttingen. In the same year, Sartorius inaugurated its Asia sales centre in Shanghai, coordinating sales and marketing activities for China and the wider Asia region.

In 2015, Sartorius acquired the cell line and process development company Cellca. By 2017, the subsidiary Sartorius Stedim Cellca was operating from a rented facility in Laupheim. A new facility in Ulm-Eselsberg was planned and later occupied in 2019.

In 2016, Sartorius acquired two North American flow cytometry companies: IntelliCyt for US$90 million and ViroCyt for US$16 million.

In July 2017, Sartorius Stedim Biotech acquired kSep Systems, a company specialising in preparative centrifugation for recombinant proteins, vaccines, and cell therapy products.

In November 2017, Sartorius Stedim Biotech opened a new bioanalytical and biosafety testing facility in Boston.

Later in 2017, Sartorius acquired the cell-based assay and instrumentation company Essen BioScience from private equity firm SFW Capital Partners for US$320 million.

In the same period, Sartorius' Cellca subsidiary entered a co-development agreement with Synpromics to test customised synthetic promoters on Cellca's CHO expression platform, and another agreement with Nova Biomedical to develop a system for large-scale testing of diverse cell culture conditions.

In 2019, Sartorius acquired the Israeli cell culture media developer and manufacturer Biological Industries.

In 2020, the company acquired selected assets from Danaher Corporation, including products for the research and development of cell therapies.

In 2021, Sartorius acquired the German cell culture media manufacturer Xell AG, the cell and gene therapy raw materials supplier CellGenix GmbH, and the bioanalytical company ALS Automated Lab Solutions GmbH.

In 2025, Sartorius partnered with Tulip Interfaces to integrate Tulip's platform with the Sartorius Biobrain automation suite.

== Products and services ==
=== Sartorius Stedim Biotech ===
Sartorius Stedim Biotech develops and supplies equipment and technologies for biopharmaceutical manufacturing, including:

- Automated cell banking systems for cryovial handling
- Single-use bioreactors
- Scaled-down bioreactor systems for process development
- Membrane chromatography devices (membrane adsorbers)
- Manufacturing process platforms and modular manufacturing facility components

=== Sartorius Stedim BioOutsource ===
Sartorius Stedim BioOutsource is a subsidiary of Sartorius Stedim Biotech and provides analytical services for biopharmaceutical development and manufacturing.

- Chemistry testing services focused on the analysis of therapeutic monoclonal antibodies, including assessment of physicochemical and structural properties

=== Sartorius Stedim Cellca ===
Sartorius Stedim Cellca develops cell line and expression technologies for biopharmaceutical production, including:

- A CHO expression platform used in the production of biological agents

== See also ==
- Laboratory equipment
