= EBF conference =

The eBF conference is a three-day event that takes place every year in Ostrava, Czech Republic. It is the largest European conference focusing on the e-enabling of the procurement process and Eauctions. It is structured as an international meeting of procurement professionals from both the public and corporate sectors who, through seminars, workshops, and presentations, share experience, information, and knowledge from the worlds of eProcurement and Esourcing.

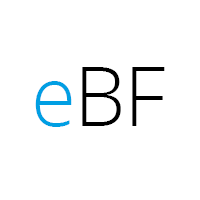
eBF conference logo

The conference first took place in Ostrava in 2005 when it was a one-day single-topic event. Over the years it has developed and offers participants dozens of programme topics. In 2015 it took place for the 11th time and attracted approximately 400 participants. It features a number of presentation and workshop spaces with specialists from public organisations and the corporate sector, and also experts from several European universities. All of the presenters offer a comparison of trends in procurement using eAuctions and other electronic procurement tools that are used in both the public and private sector throughout the EU.

== Points of interest ==
For several years the conference has been held under the auspices of the Mayor of Ostrava and organised by the Ostrava company NAR marketing. The conference is attended by procurement managers, procurement specialists, financial managers, medical equipment suppliers, representatives from cities, municipalities and authorities who are responsible for public procurement, and many more. One of the biggest attractions of eBF is the participation of foreign guests from multinationals such as RWE, Google, and Siemens. The conference organisers are rebranding it as a festival of the e-enabling of public and corporate procurement, which means that the programme takes place in five spaces concurrently and includes more than 75 speakers. The conference opens with an exhibition where works of art created by the organisers, speakers, and other participants are exhibited. The conference also features the announcement of the winners of the international Esourcing FSA (Fair Sourcing Awards) competition. Prizes are awarded to representatives of municipalities and companies, and to individuals who have contributed to the development of eAuctions.
