= Bioanalysis =

Sub-discipline of analytical chemistry

Bioanalysis is a sub-discipline of analytical chemistry covering the quantitative measurement of xenobiotics (drugs and their metabolites, and biological molecules in unnatural locations or concentrations) and biotics (macromolecules, proteins, DNA, large molecule drugs, metabolites) in biological systems.

== Modern bioanalytical chemistry ==
Many scientific endeavors are dependent upon accurate quantification of drugs and endogenous substances in biological samples; the focus of bioanalysis in the pharmaceutical industry is to provide a quantitative measure of the active drug and/or its metabolite(s) for the purpose of pharmacokinetics, toxicokinetics, bioequivalence and exposure–response (pharmacokinetics/pharmacodynamics studies). Bioanalysis also applies to drugs used for illicit purposes, forensic investigations, anti-doping testing in sports, and environmental concerns.

Bioanalysis was traditionally thought of in terms of measuring small molecule drugs. However, the past twenty years has seen an increase in biopharmaceuticals (e.g. proteins and peptides), which have been developed to address many of the same diseases as small molecules. These larger biomolecules have presented their own unique challenges to quantification.

== History ==
The first studies measuring drugs in biological fluids were carried out to determine possible overdosing as part of the new science of forensic medicine/toxicology.

Initially, nonspecific assays were applied to measuring drugs in biological fluids. These were unable to discriminate between the drug and its metabolites; for example, aspirin (c. 1900) and sulfonamides (developed in the 1930s) were quantified by the use of colorimetric assays. Antibiotics were quantified by their ability to inhibit bacterial growth. The 1930s also saw the rise of pharmacokinetics, and as such the desire for more specific assays. Modern drugs are more potent, which has required more sensitive bioanalytical assays to accurately and reliably determine these drugs at lower concentrations. This has driven improvements in technology and analytical methods.

== Bioanalytical techniques ==
Some techniques commonly used in bioanalytical studies include:

- Hyphenated techniques
  - LC–MS (liquid chromatography–mass spectrometry)
  - GC–MS (gas chromatography–mass spectrometry)
  - LC–DAD (liquid chromatography–diode array detection)
  - CE–MS (capillary electrophoresis–mass spectrometry)
- Chromatographic methods
  - HPLC (high performance liquid chromatography)
  - GC (gas chromatography)
  - UPLC (ultra performance liquid chromatography)
  - Supercritical fluid chromatography
- Electrophoresis
  - Preparative native polyacrylamide gel electrophoresis
- Ligand binding assays
  - Dual polarisation interferometry
  - ELISA (Enzyme-linked immunosorbent assay)
  - MIA (magnetic immunoassay)
  - RIA (radioimmunoassay)
- Mass spectrometry
- Nuclear magnetic resonance

The most frequently used techniques are: liquid chromatography coupled with tandem mass spectrometry (LC–MS/MS) for 'small' molecules and enzyme-linked immunosorbent assay (ELISA) for macromolecules.

== Sample preparation and extraction ==
The bioanalyst deals with complex biological samples containing the analyte alongside a diverse range of chemicals that can have an adverse impact on the accurate and precise quantification of the analyte. As such, a wide range of techniques are applied to extract the analyte from its matrix. These include:

- Protein precipitation
- Liquid–liquid extraction
- Solid phase extraction

Bioanalytical laboratories often deal with large numbers of samples, for example resulting from clinical trials. As such, automated sample preparation methods and liquid-handling robots are commonly employed to increase efficiency and reduce costs.

== Bioanalytical organisations ==
There are several national and international bioanalytical organisations active throughout the world. Often they are part of a bigger organisation, e.g. Bioanalytical Focus Group and Ligand Binding Assay Bioanalytical Focus Group, which are both within the American Association of Pharmaceutical Scientists (AAPS) and FABIAN, a working group of the Analytical Chemistry Section of the Royal Netherlands Chemical Society. The European Bioanalysis Forum (EBF), on the other hand, is independent of any larger society or association.
