= European Bioanalysis Forum =

Bioanalytical organization

The European Bioanalysis Forum (EBF) is an organisation comprising bioanalytical scientists working within the pharmaceutical industry R&D. Scope of the EBF is on bioanalysis of small and large molecules with bioanalysis being defined as:

- Quantification of drugs and metabolites in body fluids and tissues
- Quantification of PD and safety biomarkers amenable to conventional bioanalytical techniques
- Bioanalytical characterization of NBEs

Members discuss on regulatory issues and aspects (new guidelines, interpretation of existing guidelines) and present their joint opinion towards regulatory bodies and their peers. Further, they share common practices on procedures, science, Laboratory Information Management Systems (LIMS), validation, quality (GLP) and discuss new developments in industry.

== History ==
The EBF was founded in the fall of 2006 at the initiative of twelve pharmaceutical companies, all of them having bioanalytical laboratory activities in Europe. The goal of bringing these companies together was to implement a platform for discussions of science and regulatory issues. Views and recommendations following from these discussions are either published in scientific journals, like for example on the controversial and much debated topic of incurred sample reproducibility or presented at international meetings. As of May 2010 the EBF consists of 28 member companies.

== Meetings ==
The EBF intends to stimulate further harmonization of industry practices in bioanalysis, to bring a common understanding of the interpretation of regulatory issues and more clarity to the implementation of procedures in order to achieve best practices in the world of bioanalysis. The forum currently hosts two types of meetings:

=== Closed meetings ===
Twice a year the EBF brings together representatives all member companies to discuss subjects well prepared in advance. The topics range from procedural to regulatory often resulting in internal benchmarking or surveys. Next to these 'general' meetings, topic specific specialists meetings are also organized. All member companies assign one representative to these closed meetings.

=== Open meetings ===
The EBF organizes annual symposia to involve the bioanalytical community: pharmaceutical industry, academia, CRO, instrument providers and regulatory agencies. It is the intention of the organisation to inform their business partners and peers about the discussion held and agreements achieved and to open the forum for challenging procedures or techniques as well as for new regulatory requirements.

The EBF has also reached out to participate in international scientific meetings representing the bioanalytical voice of the European pharmaceutical industry. Selective examples are: American Association of Pharmaceutical Scientists meetings, The Boston Society Applied Pharmaceutical Analysis meetings, and Canadian Validation Group meeting.

== Organisation ==
=== Steering Committee ===
The organization is led by a steering committee elected from its members. The steering committee represents the EBF in international forums and sets the agenda for the closed and open meetings.

=== Interest groups ===
An Interest Group Macromolecules (EBF-IGM) was founded in 2008 to provide a platform for scientific exchange and harmonization of specific aspects for the bioanalysis of macromolecules: drugs and biomarkers as well as immunogenicity testing.

=== Sub groups ===
In 2008 the EBF started a subgroup that focuses on issues related to LIMS.
