= Single-use bioreactor =

Bioreactor with a disposable bag instead of a culture vessel

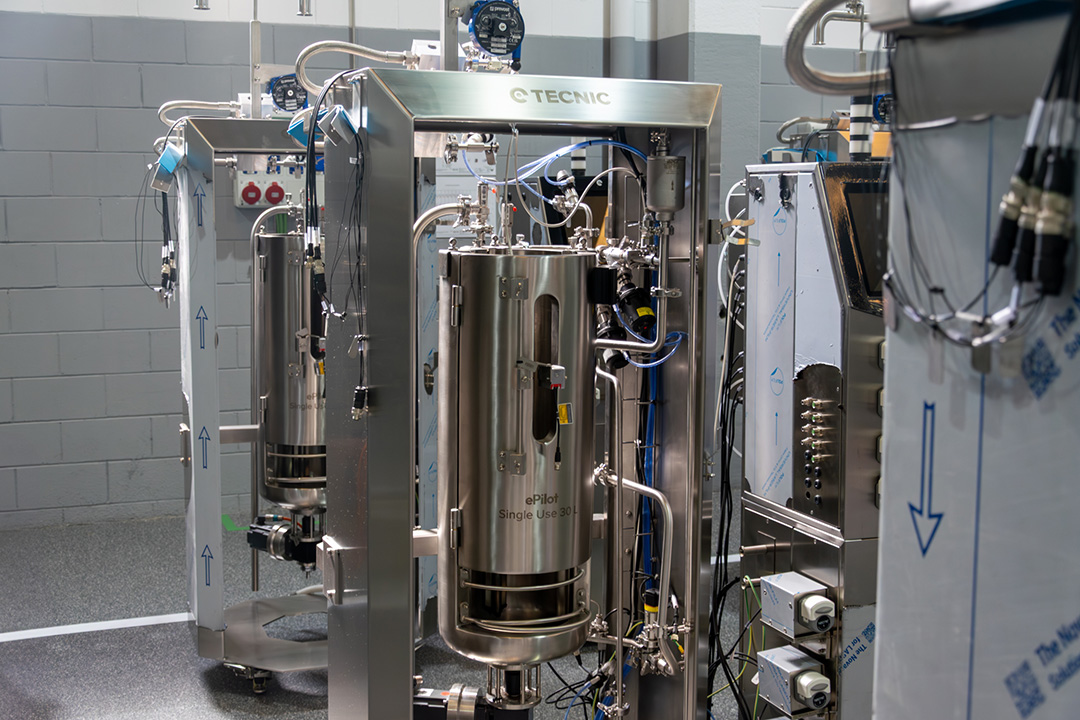
A single-use bioreactor system undergoing Factory Acceptance Testing

A single-use bioreactor or disposable bioreactor is a bioreactor with a disposable bag instead of a culture vessel. Typically, this refers to a bioreactor in which the lining in contact with the cell culture will be plastic, and this lining is encased within a more permanent structure (typically, either a rocker or a cuboid or cylindrical steel support). Commercial single-use bioreactors have been available since the end of the 1990s and are now made by several well-known producers (See below) .

== Single-use at bioreactors ==
Instead of a culture vessel made from stainless steel or glass, a single-use bioreactor is equipped with a disposable bag. The disposable bag is usually made of a three-layer plastic foil. One layer is made from Polyethylene terephthalate or LDPE to provide mechanical stability. A second layer made using PVA or PVC acts as a gas barrier. Finally, a contact layer is made from PVA or PP. For medical applications the single-use materials that contact the product must be certified by the European Medicines Agency or similar authorities responsible for other regions.

=== Types of single-use bioreactors ===
In general there are two different approaches for constructing single-use bioreactors, differing in the means used to agitate the culture medium.

Some single-use bioreactors use stirrers like conventional bioreactors, but with stirrers that are integrated into the plastic bag. The closed bag and the stirrer are pre-sterilized. In use the bag is mounted in the bioreactor and the stirrer is connected to a driver mechanically or magnetically.

Other single-use bioreactors are agitated by a rocking motion. This type of bioreactor does not need any mechanical agitators inside the single-use bag.,.

Stirred single-use bioreactors are available up to 5,000 Liters, and rocking motion bioreactors are available up to 2,500.

Several variations on these two methods exist. The Kuhner Shaker, was originally designed for media preparation, but is also useful for cell cultivation. The PBS Biotech Air Wheel technology uses buoyancy from the air feed to provide rotational power to a stirrer.

=== Measurement and control ===
Measurement and control of a cell culture process using a single-use bioreactor is challenging, as the bag in which the cultivation will be performed is a closed and pre-sterilized system. Sensors for measuring the temperature, conductivity, glucose, oxygen, or pressure must be built into the bag during the manufacturing prior to sterilization. The sensors can’t be installed prior to use of the bioreactor as in the conventional case. Consequently, some challenges must be taken into consideration. The bag is assembled, delivered and stored dry, with the consequence that the usual pH-electrodes can not be used. Calibration or additional assembly is not possible. These constraints have led to the development of preconfigured bags with new types of analytical probes. The pH value can be measured using a patch that is just a few millimeters in size. This patch consists of a protecting membrane with a pH-sensitive dye behind it. Changing pH in the culture medium changes the pH, and the color, of the dye. The color change can be detected with a laser external to the bag. This and other methods of non-invasive measurement have been developed for single-use bioreactors.

Volume/weight-control of single-use bioreactors present additional challenges due to demands of accommodating mechanical forces and movement while meeting hygienic design requirements. Mounting brackets and mechanical overload protection can introduce crevices or potential contamination traps, while mechanical stress and sideloads may affect the calibration. Instead of strain gauge load cells, capacitive load cells are frequently used for measurement and control of single-use bioreactors as they are more resistant to overloads and sideloads, and can be integrated without separate mounting kits or mechanical overload protection.

== Single-use bioprocessing ==
Decreasing product contact with parts/systems decreases qualification and validation times when changing from one drug process to another. Since the biopharmaceutical manufacturing process includes many steps other than just the use of bioreactors, single-use technologies are utilized throughout the manufacturing process due to its advantages. Single-use bioprocessing (SUS) (Note: SUS is an acronym for Single-Use Bioprocessing/System) steps available are: media and buffer preparation, cell harvesting, filtration, purification and virus inactivation. The major innovation of single-use technologies in this area of processing has been in the construction of 2D/3D bags and tubing wielding- reducing the contact of product to non-single-use parts/systems.

== Advantages and disadvantages ==
Compared with conventional bioreactor systems, the single-use solution has some advantages. Application of single-use technologies reduces cleaning and sterilization demands. Some estimates show cost savings of more than 60% with single use systems compared to fixed asset stainless steel bioreactors. In pharmaceutical production, complex qualification and validation procedures can be made easier, and will finally lead to significant cost reductions. The application of single-use bioreactors reduces the risk of cross contamination and enhances the biological and process safety. Single-use applications are especially suitable for any kind of biopharmaceutical product.

A major reason single-use bioprocessing (SUS) is popular with pharmaceutical companies and contract manufacturing organizations (CMOs) is because a process area/facility can quickly change from one process (drug product) to another. This is due to, as stated previously, reduced qualification and validation procedures. This increases productivity and costs due to less resources and time being required for changing from one process to another. Since drugs in the clinical and R&D stage (pre-commercialized drugs) are not needed on the same scale of most commercial drugs, they are often produced in single-use suites so the same area/facility can quickly switch from one drug to another. Often when drug becomes commercialized the advantages of SUSs decrease since one area/facility can be dedicated to one product- essentially eliminating the need for flexibility which is the major advantage of SUSs. It is estimated that ≥85% of pre-commercial drug product production utilizes single-use systems-based manufacturing. Stainless steel reusable systems become more advantageous as the demand for the drug product and batch size increases- often a result of the commercialization of a drug. This is not always the case, as commercialized drugs can be found being produced in single-use suits/facilities.

SUSs contain fewer parts compared with conventional biopharmaceutical manufacturing systems, so the initial and maintenance costs are reduced.

Limiting factor for the use of some single-use bioreactors is the achievable oxygen transfer, represented by the specific mass transfer coefficient (k_{L}) for the specific phase area (a), resulting in the volumetric oxygen mass transfer coefficient (k_{L}a). Theoretically this can be influenced by a higher energy input (increasing the stirrer speed or the rocking frequency). However, since single-use bioreactors are mainly used for cell culturing, the energy input is limited by the delicate nature of cells. Higher energy input leads to higher shear forces causing the risk of cell damages. Single-use bioreactors are currently available with up to a volume of about 1000 L; that’s why scale up is limited compared to conventional bioreactors. However, a handful of suppliers are now delivering units at the 2,000 liter scale and some suppliers (Sartorius, Xcellerex, Thermo Scientific HyClone and PBS Biotech) are providing a family of single-use bioreactors from bench-top to full-scale production. Three challenges exist for faster and greater single use bioreactor adoption 1) higher quality and lower cost disposable bags and containers, 2) more reusable and disposable sensors and probes that can provide high quality analytics including real-time cell culture level data points, and 3) a family of bioreactors from lab to production that has full scale-up of the bioprocess. Suppliers are working to improve plastic bag materials and performance and also to develop a broader range of sensors and probes that provide scientists greater insight to cell density, quality and other metrics needed to improve yields and product efficacy. New perfusion devices are also becoming popular for certain cell culture applications.

=== Environmental aspects ===
Environmental aspects for single-use bioreactors are important to consider due to the amount of disposable material used compared with conventional bioreactors. A complete life cycle assessment comparing single-use bioreactors and conventional bioreactors does not exist, but many ecological reasons are supporting the concept of single-use bioreactors. For a complete life cycle assessment not only the manufacturing, but also the repeated use need to be considered. Even the main part of a single-use bioreactor is not a disposable, but will be continuously reused. The plastic bag that is used instead of a culture vessel is a disposable, as well as all the integrated sub-assemblies like sensors, tubing, and stirrers. The bag and all its parts are mainly made from plastics that are derived from petroleum. Current recycling concepts are mainly focused on incineration, to recover the energy originated from the petroleum as heat and electricity. Most of the petroleum would be burned anyway in power plants or automobiles (citation required). Burning of the single use components of bioreactors creates a detour through biochemical engineering during their life cycle that does not have a big influence. The making of conventional culture vessels form stainless steel or glass requires more energy than making plastic bags. Using conventional bioreactors the culture vessel need to be cleaned and sterilized after each fermentation. Cleaning requires large amounts of water, in addition to acids, alkali and detergents. Sterilization with steam at 121 degrees C and 1 bar pressure requires large quantities of energy and large amounts of distilled water. This distilled water (often called "water for injection" in pharmaceutical nomenclature) must be prepared by expending a large amount of energy as well. A comparison of the life cycle assessment of conventional and single-use bioreactors looks much more favorable for the single-use bioreactors as expected before. According to a report of A. Sinclair et al. Single-use bioreactors will help to save 30% of electrical energy for operation, 62% of the energy input for the production of the system, 87% of water and finally 95% of detergents, all compared to conventional bioreactors.
