= Epic Battle Fantasy =

Video game series

- Genre: Role-playing video game
- Developer: Matt Roszak
- Publisher: Matt Roszak
- Platforms: Browser game Windows iOS; Android
- First release: Epic Battle Fantasy; May 1, 2009
- Latest release: Epic Battle Fantasy 5 Nov 30, 2018

Epic Battle Fantasy (often officially shortened to EBF) is a fantasy turn-based indie Action Japanese role-playing video game series created by web animator and game developer Matt Roszak. The series was inspired by the Final Fantasy series and contains many pop-culture references. Originally developed as a browser game using Adobe Flash, the games have since been ported to desktop platforms, and later, mobile platforms. In 2022, Epic Battle Fantasy 5 marks the first game in the series to be released on iOS and Android.

== Characters ==
There are five playable main characters in the Epic Battle Fantasy series.

- Matt - the warrior sword of the team, present since the first game.
- Natalie - the red mage of the team and has been present since the first game. She is the most responsible member of the team, and a frequent source of "fan service".
- Lance - a human soldier that has appeared in each game since Epic Battle Fantasy 2. While he initially serves as the villain, a fascist attempting to conquer the world, in Epic Battle Fantasy 2, he joins the party in all games afterwards. He appears as a regular character in 3 and 4, before becoming a villain and fascist once more in 5 and again rejoining the party.
- Anna - a ranger from Greenwood Village. Though she debuts in the side game called Bullet Heaven, her first appearance in a main series game occurs in Epic Battle Fantasy 4, in which she seeks out Matt, Natalie, and Lance, the prime suspects in the theft of the village's sacred jewel, and leads them into battle with the world's creator, Godcat.
- NoLegs - a blue limbless cat that accompanies the party. He fights with a sword and shield (Called "Cat Toys" in Epic Battle Fantasy 5), though like the other characters, he can wield other weapons and random objects in a similar manner. Despite first appearing in Epic Battle Fantasy as the first boss and assisting the party since Epic Battle Fantasy 2, NoLegs did not become playable until Epic Battle Fantasy 5.

== Games ==
- Epic Battle Fantasy - released on May 1, 2009, on Newgrounds. Released in Epic Battle Fantasy Collection on Steam on May 30, 2022.
- Epic Battle Fantasy 2 - released on August 20, 2009, on Newgrounds. Released in Epic Battle Fantasy Collection on Steam on May 30, 2022.
- Epic Battle Fantasy 3 - released on September 1, 2010, on Steam and two weeks later, on September 12, on Newgrounds.
- Epic Battle Fantasy 4 - released on February 24, 2013 on Steam and on March 10 the same year on Newgrounds. The game was also included in the "Overwhelmingly Positive" Humble Bundle released in January 2017.
- Epic Battle Fantasy 5 - released on Steam on November 30, 2018, then on January 21, 2020, on Newgrounds. This game was the first in the series released in both English and Japanese. It was additionally released in French, German, Polish, Russian, traditional and simplified Chinese, and Vietnamese. In late 2022, Epic Battle Fantasy 5 was released on iOS and Android.

There are several spinoff games.

- Bullet Heaven - released on April 2, 2011, on Newgrounds. Its name is a play of the name of its genre, Bullet Hell.
- Adventure Story - released on December 29, 2011, on Newgrounds. It is a platformer game.
- Bullet Heaven 2 - released on November 15, 2015, on Newgrounds, and on December 7, 2015, on Steam.
- Bullet Heaven 3 - a prototype game developed for the Flash Forward Jam hosted by Newgrounds in 2021 using the Ruffle emulator for Flash. It was ranked 3rd place in the games category.
- Epic Battle Fantasy Collection - released on May 30, 2022 on Steam and often shortened to "EBF Collection", it is a spinoff compilation of Matt Roszak's older works. It contains a variety of his older games, each of which have not been previously released on Steam, and most of which have received significant improvements and revisions. In addition, it also has some prototypes, concept art and more old, forgotten or insignificant flash-based materials.

== Reception ==
On Destructoid, writer Nior called the series "charming as hell" with a "frankly staggering amount of content on offer."

The third installment received a B score from Japanese gaming site Gekikarareview.com.

Hikaru Nomura of IGN Japan called the fifth installment of the series "an otaku JRPG, made by a JRPG otaku" and gave it an 8/10 in an in-depth review and later included the game on place 3 on his personal 2019 Game of the Year list. It was listed as the best free game of February 2020 on the Italian site ICrewPlay.com.
