= Patrick Assenheimer =

German racing driver (born 1992)

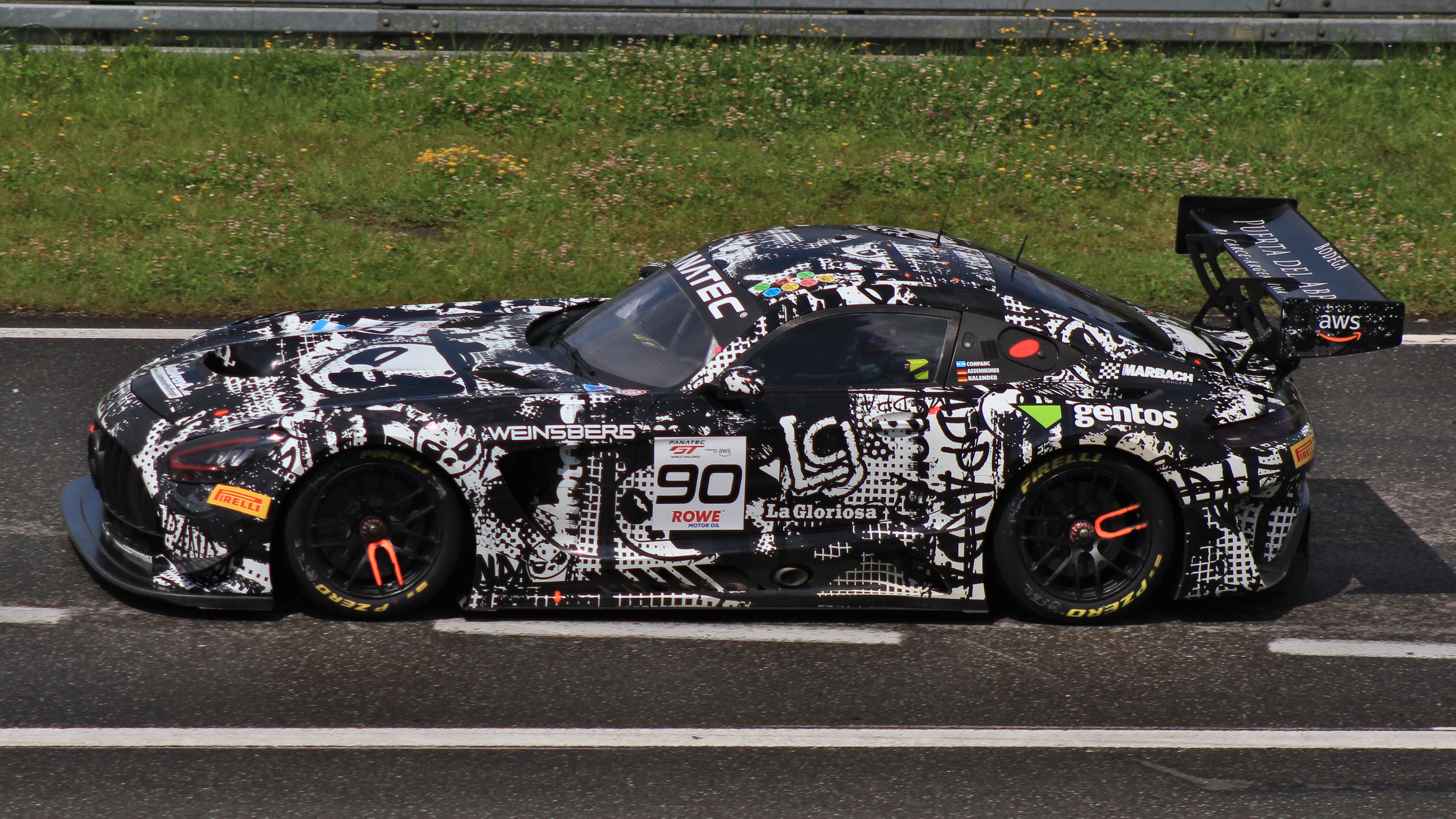
- Assenheimer in 2024
- Nationality: (Germany) German
- Born: 28 April 1992 (age 34) Heilbronn, Germany
- Categorisation: FIA Silver

Championship titles
- 2026 2019: NLS – SP9 Pro-Am; VLN Series – SP9 Pro

Patrick Assenheimer (born 28 April 1992) is a German racing driver who last competed in the Nürburgring Langstrecken-Serie for 48LOSCH Motorsport by Black Falcon.

Assenheimer competed primarily in the ADAC GT Masters and GT World Challenge Europe, first for Callaway from 2014 to 2016 and then for Mercedes-AMG from 2017 to 2024. He was VLN Series champion in 2019 and is a five-time Nürburgring 24 Hours class winner.

== Career ==
Born in Heilbronn to a family that ran a local Mercedes-Benz dealership, Assenheimer began racing in 2011, competing in the VLN Series for Team AutoArenA Motorsport. After winning the V4 class at the 24 Hours of Nürburgring twice in three seasons, Assenheimer joined Corvette-fielding Callaway Competition to compete in ADAC GT Masters alongside Diego Alessi in 2014. In his rookie season in the series, Assenheimer scored a best result of fourth at Slovakia Ring to end the year 27th in points. Returning for 2015, Assenheimer matched his best result of fourth at the Red Bull Ring and Sachsenring en route to 23rd overall. Partnering Dominik Schwager in 2016, Assenheimer scored a double podium at the Lausitzring in the new Corvette C7 GT3-R to improve to tenth in the standings.

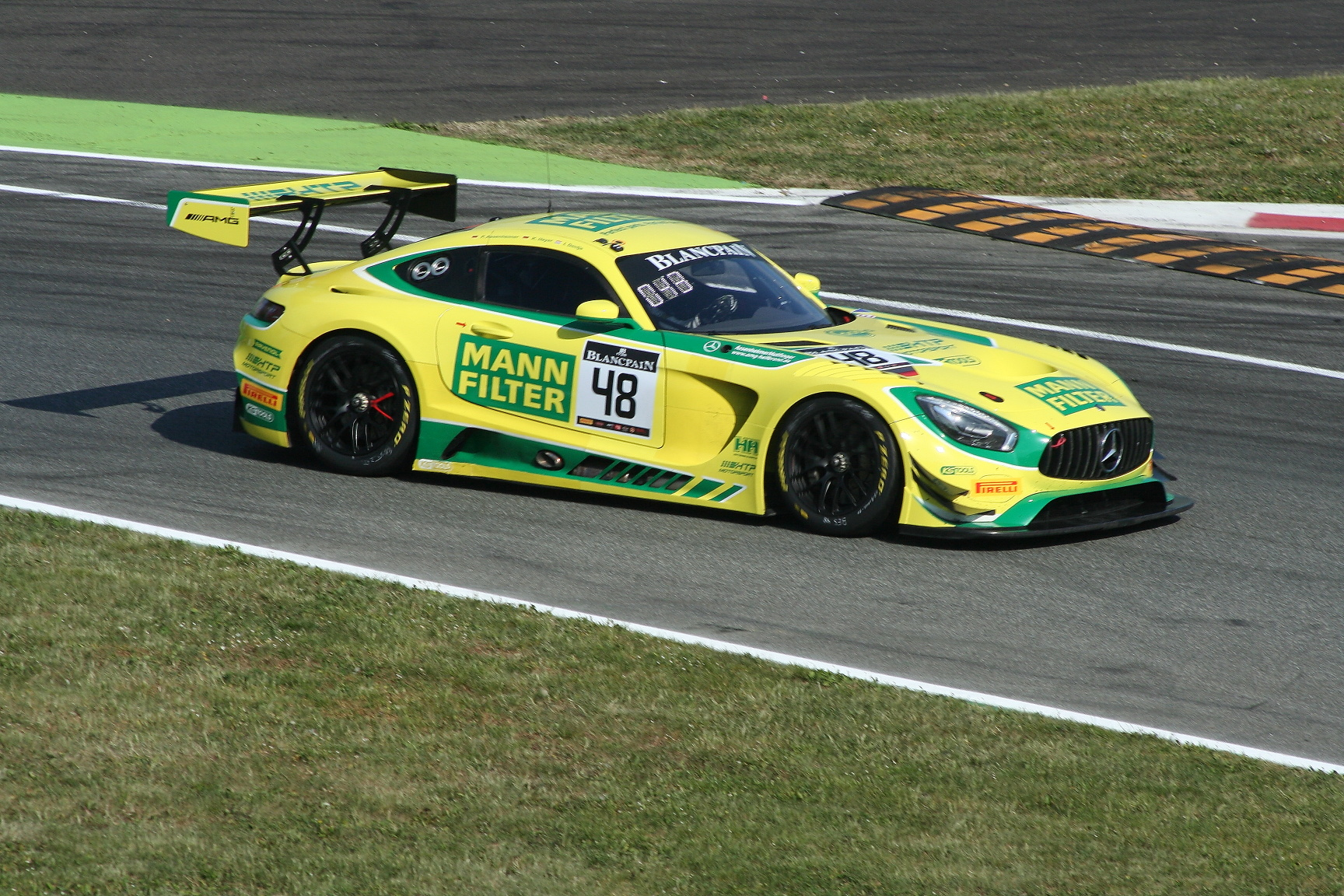
Assenheimer driving his HTP Motorsport Mercedes, nicknamed Mann-Filter Mamba, at Monza in 2017.

Assenheimer switched to Mercedes-AMG for 2017, joining HTP Motorsport for a dual campaign in the Blancpain GT Series Endurance Cup and the ADAC GT Masters, as well as an SP9 class debut at the 24 Hours of Nürburgring. Driving the Mann-Filter Mamba in the Pro class with Indy Dontje and Kenneth Heyer, Assenheimer went pointless in Blancpain. Meanwhile, Assenheimer and Maximilian Götz were 16th in GT Masters with a second place at the Sachsenring. Continuing in ADAC GT Masters for 2018, Assenheimer drove a Mercedes-AMG GT3 for HTP–run AutoArena Motorsport alongside a rotating cast of drivers, taking a lone podium at Zandvoort with Raffaele Marciello to end the season 25th in points. Assenheimer also won once in VLN with Dominik Baumann to claim runner-up in SP9 Pro points.

Moving to Black Falcon for 2019, Assenheimer won four times in the VLN Series, twice each with Manuel Metzger and Maro Engel, for a breakthrough SP9 Pro class title. In parallel, Assenheimer entered the Silver Cup of the Blancpain GT Series Endurance Cup, where he scored a podium in all but one race to secure runner-up honours alongside Hubert Haupt, a result he reprised at the IGTC's Kyalami 9 Hours. Assenheimer then returned to Black Falcon for the following year's Bathurst 12 Hour, before joining Madpanda Motorsport in the GT World Challenge Europe Endurance Cup, where he and team owner Ezequiel Pérez Companc placed fifth in Silver Cup with a class podium at the Nürburgring. During 2020, Assenheimer also finished eighth overall at the 24 Hours of Nürburgring for Mercedes-AMG Team HRT, alongside factory drivers Baumann, Engel and Dirk Müller.

At the beginning of 2021, Assenheimer pulled double duty at the Dubai 24 Hour for Haupt Racing Team, taking third overall and a win in GT3 Am, before going on to finish 25th in the Silver Cup of the GT World Challenge Europe Endurance Cup. In 2022, Assenheimer made his IMSA SportsCar Championship debut for Proton USA, taking fifth in GTD Pro at the 24 Hours of Daytona, before joining Landgraf for a campaign in the SP9 class of the NLS and the 24 Hours of Nürburgring. That year, Assenheimer also made GT World Challenge Europe Endurance Cup cameos for GetSpeed and Madpanda, as well as racing the Indianapolis 8 Hours with DXDT Racing.

After a quiet year in the GTWCE Endurance Cup's Bronze Cup with GetSpeed in 2023, Assenheimer reverted back to Madpanda and the Silver Cup for 2024. A podium at the season opener at Le Castellet helped Assenheimer to tenth in the standings, despite the team departing the series mid-season. Assenheimer ventured away from Mercedes for the first time in eight years when he drove for Aston Martin–affiliated Walkenhorst Motorsport at that year's N24. After a brief spell at HRT Ford Performance in 2025, which yielded an SP9 Pro-Am win in NLS, Assenheimer joined 48LOSCH Motorsport by Black Falcon for the 2026 Nürburgring Langstrecken-Serie. Sharing a Porsche 911 GT3 R (992.2) with Daan Arrow, Tobias Müller and Dylan Pereira, Assenheimer won the 24 Hours of Nürburgring in the SP9 Pro-Am class. The trio then followed that up with six class wins in the NLS to secure the SP9 Pro-Am title with a race to spare.

== Racing record ==
=== Racing career summary ===
| Season | Series | Team | Races | Wins | Poles | F/Laps | Podiums | Points | Position |
|---|---|---|---|---|---|---|---|---|---|
| 2011 | VLN Series – V4 | Team AutoArenA Motorsport | | | | | | | |
| 2011 | 24 Hours of Nürburgring – V4 | Team AutoArenA Motorsport | 1 | 1 | 0 | 0 | 1 | —N/a | **1st** |
| 2012 | VLN Series – V4 | Team AutoArenA Motorsport | | | | | | | |
| 2012 | 24 Hours of Nürburgring – V4 | Team AutoArenA Motorsport | 1 | 1 | 0 | 0 | 1 | —N/a | **1st** |
| 2013 | VLN Series – V4 | Team AutoArenA Motorsport | | | | | | | |
| 2013 | 24 Hours of Nürburgring – V4 | Team AutoArenA Motorsport | 1 | 0 | 0 | 0 | 1 | —N/a | **2nd** |
| 2014 | ADAC GT Masters | Callaway Competition | 16 | 0 | 0 | 0 | 0 | 32 | 27th |
| 2014 | VLN Series – V4 | Team AutoArenA Motorsport | | | | | | | |
| 2014 | 24 Hours of Nürburgring – V4 | Team AutoArenA Motorsport | 1 | 1 | 0 | 0 | 1 | —N/a | **1st** |
| 2015 | 24H Series – A6 | SPS automotive-performance | 1 | 0 | 0 | 0 | 0 | 0 | NC |
| 2015 | ADAC GT Masters | Callaway Competition | 15 | 0 | 0 | 0 | 0 | 32 | 23rd |
| 2015 | 24H Series – SP2 | RWT Racing Team | 1 | 0 | 0 | 0 | 0 | 0 | NC |
| 2015 | VLN Series – V4 | Team AutoArenA Motorsport | | | | | | | |
| 2015 | 24 Hours of Nürburgring – V4 | Team AutoArenA Motorsport | 1 | 1 | 0 | 0 | 1 | —N/a | **1st** |
| 2016 | 24H Series – 991 | RWT Racing Team | 1 | 0 | 0 | 0 | 0 | 0 | NC |
| 2016 | ADAC GT Masters | Callaway Competition | 14 | 0 | 1 | 0 | 2 | 54 | 10th |
| 2016 | VLN Series – V4 | Team AutoArenA Motorsport | | | | | | | |
| 2016 | 24 Hours of Nürburgring – V4 | Team AutoArenA Motorsport | 1 | 0 | 0 | 0 | 1 | —N/a | **2nd** |
| 2017 | 24H Series – A6-Pro | Black Falcon | 1 | 0 | 0 | 0 | 0 | 0 | NC |
| 2017 | Blancpain GT Series Endurance Cup | MANN-FILTER Team HTP Motorsport | 5 | 0 | 0 | 0 | 0 | 0 | NC |
| 2017 | Intercontinental GT Challenge | MANN-FILTER Team HTP Motorsport | 1 | 0 | 0 | 0 | 0 | 0 | NC |
| 2017 | ADAC GT Masters | Mercedes-AMG Team HTP Motorsport | 14 | 0 | 0 | 0 | 1 | 60 | 16th |
| 2017 | VLN Series – SP9 | Mann-Filter Team HTP Motorsport | 2 | 0 | 0 | 0 | 0 | | |
| 2017 | 24 Hours of Nürburgring – SP9 | Mann-Filter Team HTP Motorsport | 1 | 0 | 0 | 0 | 0 | —N/a | 14th |
| 2017 | British GT Championship – GT3 | Kornely Motorsport | 2 | 0 | 0 | 0 | 0 | 10 | 16th |
| 2018 | ADAC GT Masters | AutoArena Motorsport | 14 | 0 | 0 | 0 | 1 | 19 | 25th |
| 2018 | VLN Series – SP9 Pro | AutoArena Motorsport | 6 | 1 | 0 | 0 | 2 | 37.90 | **2nd** |
| 2018 | 24 Hours of Nürburgring – SP9 | AutoArena Motorsport | 1 | 0 | 0 | 0 | 0 | —N/a | DNF |
| 2019 | VLN Series – SP9 Pro | Black Falcon | 6 | 4 | 0 | 0 | 5 | 51.41 | **1st** |
| 2019 | 24 Hours of Nürburgring – SP9 Pro | Black Falcon | 1 | 0 | 0 | 0 | 0 | —N/a | DNF |
| 2019 | Blancpain GT Series Endurance Cup | Black Falcon | 5 | 0 | 0 | 0 | 0 | 16 | 16th |
| 2019 | Blancpain GT Series Endurance Cup – Silver | Black Falcon | 5 | 0 | 0 | 0 | 4 | 87 | **2nd** |
| 2019 | Intercontinental GT Challenge | Black Falcon | 1 | 0 | 0 | 0 | 0 | 0 | NC |
| 2020 | 24H GT Series – GT3 Pro | Toksport WRT | 1 | 0 | 0 | 0 | 0 | 12 | NC |
| 2020 | Bathurst 12 Hour – Silver | Black Falcon | 1 | 0 | 0 | 0 | 1 | —N/a | **3rd** |
| 2020 | Nürburgring Langstrecken-Serie – SP9 Pro | Mercedes-AMG Team HRT | 5 | 0 | 1 | 0 | 0 | 23.11 | 13th |
| 2020 | 24 Hours of Nürburgring – SP9 | Mercedes-AMG Team HRT AutoArena | 1 | 0 | 0 | 0 | 0 | —N/a | 8th |
| 2020 | GT World Challenge Europe Endurance Cup | Madpanda Motorsport | 5 | 0 | 0 | 0 | 0 | 0 | NC |
| 2020 | GT World Challenge Europe Endurance Cup – Silver | Madpanda Motorsport | 5 | 0 | 1 | 0 | 1 | 50 | 5th |
| 2021 | 24H GT Series – GT3 Pro | Mercedes-AMG Team HRT Bilstein | 1 | 0 | 0 | 0 | 1 | 24 | NC |
| 2021 | 24H GT Series – GT3 Am | Mercedes-AMG Team HRT Abu Dhabi Racing | 1 | 1 | 0 | 0 | 1 | 0 | NC |
| 2021 | Nürburgring Langstrecken-Serie – SP9 Pro | Mercedes-AMG Team HRT | 3 | 0 | 0 | 0 | 0 | | |
| 2021 | Nürburgring Langstrecken-Serie – SP9 Pro | HWA Team | 1 | 0 | 0 | 0 | 0 | | |
| 2021 | 24 Hours of Nürburgring – SP9 Pro | Mercedes-AMG Team HRT | 1 | 0 | 0 | 0 | 0 | —N/a | DNF |
| 2021 | GT World Challenge Europe Endurance Cup | Haupt Racing Team | 5 | 0 | 0 | 0 | 0 | 0 | NC |
| 2021 | GT World Challenge Europe Endurance Cup – Silver | Haupt Racing Team | 5 | 0 | 0 | 0 | 0 | 16 | 25th |
| 2022 | IMSA SportsCar Championship – GTD Pro | Proton USA | 1 | 0 | 0 | 0 | 0 | 290 | 27th |
| 2022 | Nürburgring Langstrecken-Serie – SP9 Pro | Mercedes-AMG Landgraf Young Talents | 2 | 0 | 0 | 0 | 0 | | |
| 2022 | Nürburgring Langstrecken-Serie – SP9 Pro | Landgraf Motorsport | 5 | 0 | 0 | 0 | 0 | | |
| 2022 | 24 Hours of Nürburgring – SP9 Pro-Am | Mercedes-AMG Mann-Filter Team Landgraf | 1 | 0 | 0 | 0 | 0 | —N/a | DNF |
| 2022 | GT World Challenge Europe Endurance Cup | GetSpeed Performance | 1 | 0 | 0 | 0 | 0 | 0 | NC |
| 2022 | GT World Challenge Europe Endurance Cup | Madpanda Motorsport | 1 | 0 | 0 | 0 | 0 | 0 | NC |
| 2022 | GT World Challenge Europe Endurance Cup – Gold | GetSpeed Performance | 1 | 0 | 0 | 0 | 0 | 11 | 22nd |
| 2022 | GT World Challenge Europe Endurance Cup – Silver | Madpanda Motorsport | 1 | 0 | 0 | 0 | 0 | 0 | NC |
| 2022 | GT World Challenge America – Pro | USALCO / DXDT Racing | 1 | 0 | 0 | 0 | 0 | 0 | NC† |
| 2023 | Nürburgring Langstrecken-Serie – SP9 Pro | Schnitzelalm Racing | 4 | 0 | 0 | 0 | 1 | 0 | NC |
| 2023 | 24 Hours of Nürburgring – SP9 Pro-Am | Schnitzelalm Racing | 1 | 0 | 0 | 0 | 0 | —N/a | DNF |
| 2023 | GT World Challenge Europe Endurance Cup | GetSpeed | 5 | 0 | 0 | 0 | 0 | 0 | NC |
| 2023 | GT World Challenge Europe Endurance Cup – Bronze | GetSpeed | 5 | 0 | 0 | 0 | 0 | 2 | 34th |
| 2024 | GT World Challenge Europe Endurance Cup | Madpanda Motorsport | 3 | 0 | 0 | 0 | 0 | 0 | NC |
| 2024 | GT World Challenge Europe Endurance Cup – Silver | Madpanda Motorsport | 3 | 0 | 0 | 0 | 1 | 49 | 10th |
| 2024 | Intercontinental GT Challenge | Madpanda Motorsport | 1 | 0 | 0 | 0 | 0 | 0 | NC |
| 2024 | Nürburgring Langstrecken-Serie – SP9 Pro-Am | Walkenhorst Motorsport | 2 | 0 | 0 | 0 | 0 | 0 | NC |
| 2024 | 24 Hours of Nürburgring – SP9 Pro-Am | Walkenhorst Motorsport | 1 | 0 | 0 | 0 | 0 | —N/a | 6th |
| 2025 | Nürburgring Langstrecken-Serie – SP9 Pro | HRT Ford Performance | 2 | 0 | 0 | 0 | 1 | 4 | NC |
| 2025 | Nürburgring Langstrecken-Serie – SP9 Pro-Am | HRT Ford Performance | 2 | 1 | 1 | 0 | 2 | 12 | NC |
| 2025 | 24 Hours of Nürburgring – SP9 Pro-Am | HRT Ford Performance | 1 | 0 | 0 | 0 | 0 | —N/a | DNF |
| 2026 | Nürburgring Langstrecken-Serie – SP9 Pro-Am | 48LOSCH Motorsport by Black Falcon | 7 | 6 | 0 | 0 | 6 | 87 | **1st** |
| 2026 | 24 Hours of Nürburgring – SP9 Pro-Am | 48LOSCH Motorsport by Black Falcon | 1 | 1 | 0 | 0 | 1 | —N/a | **1st** |
| 2026 | Intercontinental GT Challenge | 48LOSCH Motorsport by Black Falcon | 1 | 0 | 0 | 0 | 0 | 6 | 27th |

* Season still in progress.

^{†} As Assenheimer was a guest driver, he was ineligible for points.

=== Complete 24 Hours of Nürburgring results ===
| Year | Team | Co-Drivers | Car | Class | Laps | Pos. | Class Pos. |
|---|---|---|---|---|---|---|---|
| 2011 | (Germany) Team AutoArenA Motorsport | (Germany) Marc Marbach (Germany) Hannes Pfledderer | Mercedes-Benz C230 | V4 | 126 | 66th | **1st** |
| 2012 | (Germany) Team AutoArenA Motorsport | (Germany) Marc Marbach (Germany) Hannes Pfledderer | Mercedes-Benz C230 | V4 | 128 | 50th | **1st** |
| 2013 | (Germany) Team AutoArenA Motorsport | (Germany) Marc Marbach (Germany) Hannes Pfledderer | Mercedes-Benz C230 | V4 | 74 | 53rd | **2nd** |
| 2014 | (Germany) Team AutoArenA Motorsport | (Germany) Marc Marbach (Germany) Hannes Pfledderer | Mercedes-Benz C230 | V4 | 130 | 63rd | **1st** |
| 2015 | (Germany) Team AutoArenA Motorsport | (Germany) Marc Marbach (Germany) Werner Gusenbauer | Mercedes-Benz C230 | V4 | 128 | 45th | **1st** |
| 2016 | (Germany) Team AutoArenA Motorsport | (Germany) Marc Marbach (Germany) Moritz Gusenbauer | Mercedes-Benz C230 | V4 | 110 | 44th | **2nd** |
| 2017 | (Germany) Mann-Filter Team HTP Motorsport | (Germany) Kenneth Heyer (Germany) Bernd Schneider (Netherlands) Indy Dontje | Mercedes-AMG GT3 | SP9 | 155 | 14th | 14th |
| 2018 | (Germany) AutoArena Motorsport | (Netherlands) Jeroen Bleekemolen (Italy) Raffaele Marciello (Austria) Clemens Schmid | Mercedes-AMG GT3 | SP9 | 61 | DNF | DNF |
| 2019 | (Germany) Mercedes-AMG Team Black Falcon | (Germany) Nico Bastian (Netherlands) Yelmer Buurman (Italy) Gabriele Piana | Mercedes-AMG GT3 | SP9 Pro | 138 | DNF | DNF |
| 2020 | (Germany) Mercedes-AMG Team HRT AutoArena | (Austria) Dominik Baumann (Germany) Maro Engel (Germany) Dirk Müller | Mercedes-AMG GT3 Evo | SP9 | 85 | 8th | 8th |
| 2021 | (Germany) Mercedes-AMG Team HRT | (Germany) Nico Bastian (Germany) Maro Engel (Germany) Hubert Haupt | Mercedes-AMG GT3 Evo | SP9 | 46 | DNF | DNF |
| 2022 | (Germany) Mercedes-AMG Mann-Filter Team Landgraf | (Switzerland) Julien Apothéloz (Austria) Dominik Baumann (Germany) Luca-Sandro Trefz | Mercedes-AMG GT3 Evo | SP9; Pro-Am | 143 | DNF | DNF |
| 2023 | (Germany) Schnitzelalm Racing | (Germany) Marcel Marchewicz (Germany) Marek Böckmann (Netherlands) Colin Caresani | Mercedes-AMG GT3 Evo | SP9; Pro-Am | 75 | DNF | DNF |
| 2024 | (Germany) Walkenhorst Motorsport | (United States) Chandler Hull (Germany) Benjamin Mazatis (Germany) Mike David Ortmann | Aston Martin Vantage AMR GT3 Evo | SP9; Pro-Am | 48 | 19th | 6th |
| 2025 | (Germany) HRT Ford Performance | (Germany) Hubert Haupt (Germany) Vincent Kolb (Germany) Dirk Müller | Ford Mustang GT3 | SP9; Pro-Am | 52 | DNF | DNF |
| 2026 | (Germany) 48LOSCH Motorsport by Black Falcon | (Netherlands) Daan Arrow (Germany) Tobias Müller (Luxembourg) Dylan Pereira | Porsche 911 GT3 R (992.2) | SP9; Pro-Am | 154 | 9th | **1st** |

=== Complete ADAC GT Masters results ===
(key) (Races in bold indicate pole position) (Races in italics indicate fastest lap)

| Year | Team | Car | 1 | 2 | 3 | 4 | 5 | 6 | 7 | 8 | 9 | 10 | 11 | 12 | 13 | 14 | 15 | 16 | DC | Points |
|---|---|---|---|---|---|---|---|---|---|---|---|---|---|---|---|---|---|---|---|---|
| 2014 | Callaway Competition | Corvette Z06.R GT3 | OSC; 1; 14 | OSC; 2; 6 | ZAN; 1; 22 | ZAN; 2 Ret | LAU; 1 Ret | LAU; 2; 11 | RBR; 1; 14 | RBR; 2; 8 | SLO; 1; 10 | SLO; 2; 4 | NÜR; 1; 11 | NÜR; 2; 10 | SAC; 1 Ret | SAC; 2; 15 | HOC; 1; 13 | HOC; 2; 7 | 27th | 32 |
| 2015 | Callaway Competition | Corvette Z06.R GT3 | OSC; 1 Ret | OSC; 2; 13 | RBR; 1; 4 | RBR; 2; 15 | SPA; 1; 9 | SPA; 2; 14 | LAU; 1 Ret | LAU; 2 Ret | NÜR; 1; 7 | NÜR; 2; 12 | SAC; 1; 4 | SAC; 2; 15 | ZAN; 1 Ret | ZAN; 2 DNS | HOC; 1; 12 | HOC; 2 Ret | 23rd | 32 |
| 2016 | Callaway Competition | Corvette C7 GT3-R | OSC; 1; 11 | OSC; 2; 9 | SAC; 1; 19 | SAC; 2; 13 | LAU; 1; 3 | **LAU**; **2**; 2 | RBR; 1; 4 | RBR; 2 Ret | NÜR; 1; 10 | NÜR; 2; 27 | ZAN; 1 Ret | ZAN; 2; 12 | HOC; 1; 11 | HOC; 2; 7 | | | 10th | 54 |
| 2017 | Mercedes-AMG Team HTP Motorsport | Mercedes-AMG GT3 | OSC; 1; 16 | OSC; 2; 20 | LAU; 1; 19 | LAU; 2; 6 | RBR; 1; 6 | RBR; 2; 4 | ZAN; 1; 9 | ZAN; 2 Ret | NÜR; 1; 7 | NÜR; 2 Ret | SAC; 1; 7 | SAC; 2; 2 | HOC; 1 Ret | HOC; 2 Ret | | | 16th | 60 |
| 2018 | AutoArenA Motorsport | Mercedes-AMG GT3 | OSC; 1; 17 | OSC; 2; 13 | MST; 1 Ret | MST; 2; 21 | RBR; 1; 23 | RBR; 2; 20 | NÜR; 1 Ret | NÜR; 2; 21 | ZAN; 1; 13 | ZAN; 2; 2 | SAC; 1; 15 | SAC; 2; 13 | HOC; 1; 10 | HOC; 2; 25 | | | 25th | 19 |

=== Complete GT World Challenge Europe results ===
==== GT World Challenge Europe Endurance Cup ====
(key) (Races in bold indicate pole position) (Races in italics indicate fastest lap)

| Year | Team | Car | Class | 1 | 2 | 3 | 4 | 5 | 6 | 7 | Pos. | Points |
|---|---|---|---|---|---|---|---|---|---|---|---|---|
| 2017 | HTP Motorsport | Mercedes-AMG GT3 | Pro | MNZ; 14 | SIL; Ret | LEC; 18 | SPA; 6H; 47 | SPA; 12H; 51 | SPA; 24H; Ret | CAT; 40 | NC | 0 |
| 2019 | Black Falcon | Mercedes-AMG GT3 | Silver | MNZ; 5 | SIL; 20 | LEC; 14 | SPA; 6H; 21 | SPA; 12H; 40 | SPA; 24H; 24 | CAT; 7 | 2nd | 87 |
| 2020 | Madpanda Motorsport | Mercedes-AMG GT3 Evo | Silver | IMO; 22 | NÜR; 17 | SPA; 6H; 41 | SPA; 12H; 34 | SPA; 24H; 26 | LEC; 25 | | 5th | 50 |
| 2021 | Haupt Racing Team | Mercedes-AMG GT3 Evo | Silver | MNZ; 22 | LEC; 23 | SPA; 6H; Ret | SPA; 12H; Ret | SPA; 24H; Ret | NÜR; 14 | CAT; 42 | 25th | 16 |
| 2022 | GetSpeed Performance | Mercedes-AMG GT3 Evo | Gold | IMO | LEC | SPA; 6H; 48 | SPA; 12H; 41 | SPA; 24H; 31 | | | 22nd | 11 |
| 2022 | Madpanda Motorsport | Mercedes-AMG GT3 Evo | Silver | | | | | | HOC; Ret | CAT | NC | 0 |
| 2023 | GetSpeed | Mercedes-AMG GT3 Evo | Bronze | MNZ; Ret | LEC; Ret | SPA; 6H; 54 | SPA; 12H; 40 | SPA; 24H; 32 | NÜR; 50† | CAT; 45† | 34th | 2 |
| 2024 | Madpanda Motorsport | Mercedes-AMG GT3 Evo | Silver | LEC; 22 | SPA; 6H; 19 | SPA; 12H; 43 | SPA; 24H; 31 | NÜR; 32 | MNZ | JED | 10th | 49 |

=== Complete British GT Championship results ===
(key) (Races in bold indicate pole position in class) (Races in italics indicate fastest lap in class)

| Year | Entrant | Chassis | Class | 1 | 2 | 3 | 4 | 5 | 6 | 7 | 8 | 9 | 10 | DC | Pts |
|---|---|---|---|---|---|---|---|---|---|---|---|---|---|---|---|
| 2017 | Kornely Motorsport | Mercedes-AMG GT3 | GT3 | OUL; 1 | OUL; 2 | ROC | SNE; 1 | SNE; 2 | SIL | SPA; 1; 12 | SPA; 2; 5 | BRH | DON | 16th | 10 |

=== Complete IMSA SportsCar Championship results ===
(key) (Races in bold indicate pole position; races in italics indicate fastest lap)

| Year | Team | Class | Make | Engine | 1 | 2 | 3 | 4 | 5 | 6 | 7 | 8 | 9 | 10 | Rank | Points |
|---|---|---|---|---|---|---|---|---|---|---|---|---|---|---|---|---|
| 2022 | Proton USA | GTD Pro | Mercedes-AMG GT3 Evo | Mercedes-AMG M159 6.2 L V8 | DAY; 5 | SEB | LBH | LGA | WGL | MOS | LIM | ELK | VIR | PET | 27th | 290 |
