= 2014 ADAC GT Masters =

Motorsport season

The 2014 ADAC GT Masters season was the eighth season of the ADAC GT Masters, the grand tourer-style sports car racing founded by the German automobile club ADAC. The season started on 26 April at Motorsport Arena Oschersleben and ended on 5 October at Hockenheim after eight double-header meetings.

The drivers' championship was won by Prosperia C. Abt Racing pairing René Rast and Kelvin van der Linde, finishing 26 points of their nearest rival, Jaap van Lagen of GW IT Racing Team Schütz Motorsport. A further four points behind in third place was Callaway Competition's Daniel Keilwitz, the defending series champion. Keilwitz won the most races during the season with six victories; winning four with Andreas Wirth and two with Oliver Gavin, who split the season alongside Keilwitz. Rast and van der Linde won three races during the season, while van Lagen won two with Kévin Estre. HTP Motorsport and Pixum Team Schubert also won two races, with their respective pairings of Maximilian Buhk and Maximilian Götz, and Dominik Baumann and Claudia Hürtgen, while the other race victory was taken by the RWT RacingTeam, with Sven Barth and David Jahn prevailing at the Nürburgring.

The teams' championship was also won by Prosperia C. Abt Racing, with two other entries also scoring points towards the championship besides the car of Rast and van der Linde. The team finished four points clear of Callaway Competition, who had entered four cars, with Pixum Team Schubert finishing a further four points behind. Herbert Handlos was the winner of the Gentlemen Drivers' Cup, finishing 72.5 points clear of his nearest rival, Dominic Jöst.

== Entry list ==
Team	Car	No.	Driver	Rounds
(Germany) Callaway Competition	Corvette Z06.R GT3	1	(Germany) Daniel Keilwitz	All
(Germany) Callaway Competition	Corvette Z06.R GT3	1	(United Kingdom) Oliver Gavin	1, 3–4
(Germany) Callaway Competition	Corvette Z06.R GT3	1	(Germany) Andreas Wirth	2, 5–8
(Germany) Callaway Competition	Corvette Z06.R GT3	2	(Germany) Patrick Assenheimer	All
(Germany) Callaway Competition	Corvette Z06.R GT3	2	(Italy) Diego Alessi	All
(Germany) Callaway Competition	Corvette Z06.R GT3	17	(Switzerland) Remo Lips	All
(Germany) Callaway Competition	Corvette Z06.R GT3	17	(Germany) Lennart Marioneck	All
(Germany) Callaway Competition	Corvette Z06.R GT3	18	(Switzerland) Toni Seiler	All
(Germany) Callaway Competition	Corvette Z06.R GT3	18	(Netherlands) Jeroen Bleekemolen	1–4, 6
(Germany) Callaway Competition	Corvette Z06.R GT3	18	(Sweden) Andreas Simonsen	5, 8
(Germany) Callaway Competition	Corvette Z06.R GT3	18	(Netherlands) Sebastiaan Bleekemolen	7
(Germany) GW IT Racing Team Schütz Motorsport	Porsche 911 GT3 R	3	(Netherlands) Jaap van Lagen	All
(Germany) GW IT Racing Team Schütz Motorsport	Porsche 911 GT3 R	3	(Germany) Christian Engelhart	1, 4–8
(Germany) GW IT Racing Team Schütz Motorsport	Porsche 911 GT3 R	3	(France) Kévin Estre	2
(Germany) GW IT Racing Team Schütz Motorsport	Porsche 911 GT3 R	3	(Austria) Martin Ragginger	3
(Germany) GW IT Racing Team Schütz Motorsport	Porsche 911 GT3 R	4	(Greece) Antonios Wossos	All
(Germany) GW IT Racing Team Schütz Motorsport	Porsche 911 GT3 R	4	(Netherlands) Wolf Nathan	All
(Germany) Farnbacher Racing	Porsche 911 GT3 R	5	(Australia) Nathan Morcom	All
(Germany) Farnbacher Racing	Porsche 911 GT3 R	5	(Germany) Mario Farnbacher	1–4, 6
(Germany) Farnbacher Racing	Porsche 911 GT3 R	5	(Spain) Alex Riberas	5
(Germany) Farnbacher Racing	Porsche 911 GT3 R	5	(Poland) Robert Lukas	7–8
(Germany) Farnbacher Racing	Porsche 911 GT3 R	6	(Germany) Sebastian Asch	All
(Germany) Farnbacher Racing	Porsche 911 GT3 R	6	(Switzerland) Philipp Frommenwiler	All
(Germany) Tonino Team Herberth	Porsche 911 GT3 R	7	(Germany) Alfred Renauer	All
(Germany) Tonino Team Herberth	Porsche 911 GT3 R	7	(Austria) Herbert Handlos	All
(Germany) Tonino Team Herberth	Porsche 911 GT3 R	8	(Germany) Robert Renauer	All
(Germany) Tonino Team Herberth	Porsche 911 GT3 R	8	(Austria) Norbert Siedler	1–6
(Germany) Tonino Team Herberth	Porsche 911 GT3 R	8	(Germany) Dominik Schwager	7
(Germany) Tonino Team Herberth	Porsche 911 GT3 R	8	(Austria) Martin Ragginger	8
(Germany) Tonino Team Herberth	Porsche 911 GT3 R	9	(Germany) Dominik Jöst	All
(Germany) Tonino Team Herberth	Porsche 911 GT3 R	9	(Germany) Florian Scholze	1–3, 5–8
(Germany) Tonino Team Herberth	Porsche 911 GT3 R	9	(Germany) Stefan Wackerbauer	4
(Germany) Prosperia C. Abt Racing	Audi R8 LMS ultra	10	(South Africa) Kelvin van der Linde	All
(Germany) Prosperia C. Abt Racing	Audi R8 LMS ultra	10	(Germany) René Rast	All
(Germany) Prosperia C. Abt Racing	Audi R8 LMS ultra	11	(Germany) Fabian Hamprecht	All
(Germany) Prosperia C. Abt Racing	Audi R8 LMS ultra	11	(Denmark) Nicki Thiim	All
(Germany) Prosperia C. Abt Racing	Audi R8 LMS ultra	12	(Germany) Markus Winkelhock	1–3, 5–6
(Germany) Prosperia C. Abt Racing	Audi R8 LMS ultra	12	(Germany) Stefan Wackerbauer	1
(Germany) Prosperia C. Abt Racing	Audi R8 LMS ultra	12	(Germany) Christer Jöns	2, 6
(Germany) Prosperia C. Abt Racing	Audi R8 LMS ultra	12	(France) Sébastien Ogier	3
(Germany) Prosperia C. Abt Racing	Audi R8 LMS ultra	12	(Austria) Nikolaus Mayr-Melnhof	5
(Germany) RWT Racing	Corvette Z06.R GT3	13	(Germany) Sven Barth	All
(Germany) RWT Racing	Corvette Z06.R GT3	13	(Germany) David Jahn	All
(Germany) MRS GT-Racing	McLaren MP4-12C GT3	14	(Germany) Florian Spengler	All
(Germany) MRS GT-Racing	McLaren MP4-12C GT3	14	(United Kingdom) Ryan Sharp	1
(Germany) MRS GT-Racing	McLaren MP4-12C GT3	14	(Estonia) Marko Asmer	2–6
(Germany) MRS GT-Racing	McLaren MP4-12C GT3	14	(Germany) Christopher Brück	7
(Germany) MRS GT-Racing	McLaren MP4-12C GT3	14	(Portugal) Álvaro Parente	8
(Germany) Yaco Racing	Audi R8 LMS ultra	16	(Germany) Philip Geipel	All
(Germany) Yaco Racing	Audi R8 LMS ultra	16	(Switzerland) Rahel Frey	1–6, 8
(Germany) Yaco Racing	Audi R8 LMS ultra	16	(Germany) Markus Winkelhock	7
(Germany) PIXUM Team Schubert	BMW Z4 GT3	19	(Germany) Claudia Hürtgen	All
(Germany) PIXUM Team Schubert	BMW Z4 GT3	19	(Austria) Dominik Baumann	All
(Germany) PIXUM Team Schubert	BMW Z4 GT3	20	(Germany) Max Sandritter	All
(Germany) PIXUM Team Schubert	BMW Z4 GT3	20	(Germany) Jens Klingmann	All
(Germany) BKK Mobil Oil Racing Team Zakspeed	Mercedes-Benz SLS AMG GT3	21	(Germany) Luca Ludwig	All
(Germany) BKK Mobil Oil Racing Team Zakspeed	Mercedes-Benz SLS AMG GT3	21	(Israel) Alon Day	1–7
(Germany) BKK Mobil Oil Racing Team Zakspeed	Mercedes-Benz SLS AMG GT3	21	(Latvia) Harald Schlegelmilch	8
(Germany) Rowe Racing	Mercedes-Benz SLS AMG GT3	22	(Spain) Jaime Alguersuari	3–8
(Germany) Rowe Racing	Mercedes-Benz SLS AMG GT3	22	(Germany) Nico Bastian	3–8
(Germany) Rowe Racing	Mercedes-Benz SLS AMG GT3	23	(Germany) Jan Seyffarth	All
(Germany) Rowe Racing	Mercedes-Benz SLS AMG GT3	23	(Germany) Maro Engel	All
(Germany) Reiter Engineering	Chevrolet Camaro GT3	24	(Germany) Albert von Thurn und Taxis	All
(Germany) Reiter Engineering	Chevrolet Camaro GT3	24	(Czech Republic) Tomáš Enge	1, 3–8
(Germany) Reiter Engineering	Chevrolet Camaro GT3	24	(Netherlands) Peter Kox	2
(Switzerland) Blancpain Racing	Lamborghini Gallardo FL2	25	(Switzerland) Marc A. Hayek	1
(Switzerland) Blancpain Racing	Lamborghini Gallardo FL2	25	(Netherlands) Peter Kox	1
(Germany) HTP Motorsport	Mercedes-Benz SLS AMG GT3	26	(Germany) Maximilian Götz	1–6
(Germany) HTP Motorsport	Mercedes-Benz SLS AMG GT3	26	(Germany) Maximilian Buhk	1–5
(Germany) HTP Motorsport	Mercedes-Benz SLS AMG GT3	26	(Netherlands) Renger van der Zande	6
(Germany) HTP Motorsport	Mercedes-Benz SLS AMG GT3	27	(Germany) Luca Stolz	All
(Germany) HTP Motorsport	Mercedes-Benz SLS AMG GT3	27	(Germany) Heinz-Harald Frentzen	1–4
(Germany) HTP Motorsport	Mercedes-Benz SLS AMG GT3	27	(Austria) Mathias Lauda	5–6
(Germany) HTP Motorsport	Mercedes-Benz SLS AMG GT3	27	(Germany) Maximilian Götz	7–8
(Austria) GRT Grasser Racing Team	Lamborghini Gallardo FL2	31	(Austria) Sandro Bickel	4
(Austria) GRT Grasser Racing Team	Lamborghini Gallardo FL2	31	(Austria) Sascha Halek	4
(Austria) GRT Grasser Racing Team	Lamborghini Gallardo FL2	32	(Austria) Gerhard Tweraser	4–5
(Austria) GRT Grasser Racing Team	Lamborghini Gallardo FL2	32	(Austria) Harald Proczyk	4
(Austria) GRT Grasser Racing Team	Lamborghini Gallardo FL2	32	(Czech Republic) Tomas Pivoda	5
(Germany) Dupré Engineering Motorsport	Audi R8 LMS ultra	33	(Germany) Christoph Dupré	8
(Germany) Dupré Engineering Motorsport	Audi R8 LMS ultra	33	(Germany) Thomas Schöffler	8
(Germany) kfzteile24 APR Motorsport	Audi R8 LMS ultra	100	(Austria) Daniel Dobitsch	All
(Germany) kfzteile24 APR Motorsport	Audi R8 LMS ultra	100	(Germany) Florian Stoll	All

== Race calendar and results ==
The eight-event calendar for the 2014 season was announced on 25 November 2013.

Round		Circuit	Date	Pole position	Race winner
1	R1	(Germany) Motorsport Arena Oschersleben	26 April	No. 10 Prosperia C. Abt Racing	No. 26 HTP Motorsport
1	R1	(Germany) Motorsport Arena Oschersleben	26 April	(Germany) René Rast (South Africa) Kelvin van der Linde	(Germany) Maximilian Buhk (Germany) Maximilian Götz
1	R2	(Germany) Motorsport Arena Oschersleben	27 April	No. 10 Prosperia C. Abt Racing	No. 10 Prosperia C. Abt Racing
1	R2	(Germany) Motorsport Arena Oschersleben	27 April	(Germany) René Rast (South Africa) Kelvin van der Linde	(Germany) René Rast (South Africa) Kelvin van der Linde
2	R1	(Netherlands) Circuit Park Zandvoort	10 May	No. 8 Tonino Team Herberth	No. 3 GW IT Racing Team Schütz Motorsport
2	R1	(Netherlands) Circuit Park Zandvoort	10 May	(Germany) Robert Renauer (Austria) Norbert Siedler	(Netherlands) Jaap van Lagen (France) Kévin Estre
2	R2	(Netherlands) Circuit Park Zandvoort	11 May	No. 10 Prosperia C. Abt Racing	No. 3 GW IT Racing Team Schütz Motorsport
2	R2	(Netherlands) Circuit Park Zandvoort	11 May	(Germany) René Rast (South Africa) Kelvin van der Linde	(Netherlands) Jaap van Lagen (France) Kévin Estre
3	R1	(Germany) Lausitzring	24 May	No. 1 Callaway Competition	No. 26 HTP Motorsport
3	R1	(Germany) Lausitzring	24 May	(Germany) Daniel Keilwitz (United Kingdom) Oliver Gavin	(Germany) Maximilian Buhk (Germany) Maximilian Götz
3	R2	(Germany) Lausitzring	25 May	No. 19 PIXUM Team Schubert	No. 19 PIXUM Team Schubert
3	R2	(Germany) Lausitzring	25 May	(Germany) Claudia Hürtgen (Austria) Dominik Baumann	(Germany) Claudia Hürtgen (Austria) Dominik Baumann
4	R1	(Austria) Red Bull Ring	7 June	No. 1 Callaway Competition	No. 1 Callaway Competition
4	R1	(Austria) Red Bull Ring	7 June	(Germany) Daniel Keilwitz (United Kingdom) Oliver Gavin	(Germany) Daniel Keilwitz (United Kingdom) Oliver Gavin
4	R2	(Austria) Red Bull Ring	8 June	No. 1 Callaway Competition	No. 1 Callaway Competition
4	R2	(Austria) Red Bull Ring	8 June	(Germany) Daniel Keilwitz (United Kingdom) Oliver Gavin	Drivers' championship (United Kingdom) Oliver Gavin
5	R1	Automotodróm Slovakia Ring	9 August	No. 20 PIXUM Team Schubert	No. 19 PIXUM Team Schubert
5	R1	Automotodróm Slovakia Ring	9 August	(Germany) Max Sandritter (Germany) Jens Klingmann	(Germany) Claudia Hürtgen (Austria) Dominik Baumann
5	R2	Automotodróm Slovakia Ring	10 August	No. 20 PIXUM Team Schubert	No. 1 Callaway Competition
5	R2	Automotodróm Slovakia Ring	10 August	(Germany) Max Sandritter (Germany) Jens Klingmann	(Germany) Daniel Keilwitz (Germany) Andreas Wirth
6	R1	(Germany) Nürburgring	30 August	No. 21 BKK Mobil Oil Racing Team Zakspeed	No. 13 RWT RacingTeam
6	R1	(Germany) Nürburgring	30 August	(Germany) Luca Ludwig (Israel) Alon Day	(Germany) Sven Barth (Germany) David Jahn
6	R2	(Germany) Nürburgring	31 August	No. 11 Prosperia C. Abt Racing	No. 1 Callaway Competition
6	R2	(Germany) Nürburgring	31 August	(Germany) Fabian Hamprecht (Denmark) Nicki Thiim	(Germany) Daniel Keilwitz (Germany) Andreas Wirth
7	R1	(Germany) Sachsenring	20 September	No. 10 Prosperia C. Abt Racing	No. 10 Prosperia C. Abt Racing
7	R1	(Germany) Sachsenring	20 September	(Germany) René Rast (South Africa) Kelvin van der Linde	(Germany) René Rast (South Africa) Kelvin van der Linde
7	R2	(Germany) Sachsenring	21 September	No. 11 Prosperia C. Abt Racing	No. 10 Prosperia C. Abt Racing
7	R2	(Germany) Sachsenring	21 September	(Germany) Fabian Hamprecht (Denmark) Nicki Thiim	(Germany) René Rast (South Africa) Kelvin van der Linde
8	R1	(Germany) Hockenheimring	4 October	No.21 BKK Mobil Oil Racing Team Zakspeed	No. 1 Callaway Competition
8	R1	(Germany) Hockenheimring	4 October	(Germany) Luca Ludwig (Latvia) Harald Schlegelmilch	(Germany) Daniel Keilwitz (Germany) Andreas Wirth
8	R2	(Germany) Hockenheimring	5 October	No. 1 Callaway Competition	No. 1 Callaway Competition
8	R2	(Germany) Hockenheimring	5 October	(Germany) Daniel Keilwitz (Germany) Andreas Wirth	(Germany) Daniel Keilwitz (Germany) Andreas Wirth

== Championship standings ==
=== Scoring system ===
Championship points were awarded for the first ten positions in each race.

Position	1st	2nd	3rd	4th	5th	6th	7th	8th	9th	10th
Points	25	18	15	12	10	8	6	4	2	1

=== Drivers' championship ===
Pos.	Driver	OSC (Germany)		ZAN (Netherlands)		LAU (Germany)		RBR (Austria)		SLO (Slovakia)		NÜR (Germany)		SAC (Germany)		HOC (Germany)		Points
1	(South Africa) Kelvin van der Linde	2	1	3	2	7	2	10	2	6	10	6	2	1	1	10	6	214
1	(Germany) René Rast	2	1	3	2	7	2	10	2	6	10	6	2	1	1	10	6	214
2	(Netherlands) Jaap van Lagen	3	2	1	1	6	3	9	11	5	5	5	4	2	17	11	2	188
3	(Germany) Daniel Keilwitz	Ret	Ret	8	9	3	9	1	1	4	1	Ret	1	Ret	13	1	1	184
4	(Germany) Claudia Hürtgen	6	3	4	5	4	1	20	4	1	3	9	15	3	6	6	5	177
4	(Austria) Dominik Baumann	6	3	4	5	4	1	20	4	1	3	9	15	3	6	6	5	177
5	(Germany) Maximilian Götz	1	DNF	9	6	1	16	3	3	21	DSQ	7	3	7	11	8	3	136
6	(Germany) Andreas Wirth			8	9					4	1	Ret	1	Ret	13	1	1	118
7	(Germany) Robert Renauer	7	4	12	12	2	Ret	6	7	18	15	3	7	19	2	3	4	118
8	(Germany) Christian Engelhart	3	2					9	11	5	5	5	4	2	17	11	2	115
9	(Germany) Jens Klingmann	20	Ret	7	7	Ret	6	5	5	2	17	12	5	Ret	5	4	17	92
9	(Germany) Max Sandritter	20	Ret	7	7	Ret	6	5	5	2	17	12	5	Ret	5	4	17	92
10	(Germany) Maximilian Buhk	1	Ret	9	6	1	16	3	3	21	DSQ							90
11	(Germany) Luca Ludwig	11	8	24	?	5	21	7	6	9	7	2	8	Ret	18	2	9	80
12	(Germany) Jan Seyffarth	5	13	19	10	9	5	13	13	7	6	4	6	6	8	5	Ret	79
12	(Germany) Maro Engel	5	13	19	10	9	5	13	13	7	6	4	6	6	8	5	Ret	79
13	(Austria) Norbert Siedler	7	4	12	12	2	Ret	6	7			3	7					73
14	(United Kingdom) Oliver Gavin	Ret	Ret			3	9	1	1									66
15	(Israel) Alon Day	11	8	24	?	5	21	7	6	9	7	2	8	Ret	18			60
16	(Germany) Markus Winkelhock	Ret	Ret	2	4	13	8			14	13	8	18	5	4			58
17	(Germany) Sven Barth	8	Ret	17	15			8	Ret	3	19	1	DNS	8	14	12	Ret	54
17	(Germany) David Jahn	8	Ret	17	15			8	Ret	3	19	1	DNS	8	14	12	Ret	54
18	(France) Kévin Estre			1	1													50
19	(Austria) Martin Ragginger					6	3									3	4	50
20	(Germany) Albert von Thurn und Taxis	16	Ret	21	Ret	10	14	2	Ret	8	2	Ret	11	15	Ret	25	8	49
21	(Czech Republic) Tomáš Enge	16	Ret			10	14	2	Ret	8	2	Ret	11	15	Ret	25	8	49
22	(Denmark) Nicki Thiim	Ret	Ret	5	3	20	22	19	16	20	Ret	DSQ	DSQ	9	3	15	14	42
23	(Germany) Fabian Hamprecht	Ret	Ret	5	3	20	22	19	16	20	Ret	DSQ	DSQ	9	3			42
24	(Germany) Luca Stolz	21	7	14	Ret	Ret	13	22	12	19	9	10	9	7	11	8	3	36
25	(Germany) Sebastian Asch	13	11	10	8	Ret	4	12	21	13	Ret	Ret	Ret	4	21	7	DSQ	35
25	(Switzerland) Philipp Frommenwiler	13	11	10	8	Ret	4	12	21	13	Ret	Ret	Ret	4	21	7	DSQ	35
26	(Germany) Christer Jöns			2	4							8	18			15	14	34
27	(Italy) Diego Alessi	14	6	22	Ret	Ret	11	14	8	10	4	11	10	Ret	15	13	7	32
27	(Germany) Patrick Assenheimer	14	6	22	Ret	Ret	11	14	8	10	4	11	10	Ret	15	13	7	32
28	(Germany) Philip Geipel	9	9	13	Ret	14	18	24	18	11	Ret	14	14	5	4	14	Ret	26
29	(Germany) Nico Bastian					8	7	11	10	Ret	8	Ret	Ret	11	7	9	Ret	24
29	(Spain) Jaime Alguersuari					8	7	11	10	Ret	8	Ret	Ret	11	7	9	Ret	24
30	(Netherlands) Renger van der Zande											7	3					21
31	(Latvia) Harald Schlegelmilch															2	9	20
32	(Austria) Daniel Dobitsch	4	DNF	6	?	15	10	23	Ret	17	Ret	20	19	Ret	Ret	16	12	20
32	(Germany) Florian Stoll	4	DNF	6	?	15	10	23	Ret	17	Ret	20	19	Ret	Ret	16	12	20
33	(Germany) Dominik Schwager													19	2			18
34	(Austria) Herbert Handlos	15	5	15	14	12	12	27	14	18	15	17	13	10	10	19	11	12
35	(Germany) Alfred Renauer	15	5	15	14	12	12	27	14			17	13	10	10	19	11	12
36	(Germany) Heinz-Harald Frentzen	21	7	14	Ret	Ret	13	22	12									6
37	(Australia) Nathan Morcom	Ret	10	11	13	11	23	17	9	15	Ret	15	12	13	9	20	Ret	5
38	(Austria) Mathias Lauda									19	9	10	9					5
39	(Switzerland) Rahel Frey	9	9	13	Ret	14	18	24	18	11	Ret	14	14			14	Ret	4
40	(Germany) Mario Farnbacher	Ret	10	11	13	11	23	17	9			15	12					3
41	(Poland) Robert Lukas													13	9	20	Ret	2
42	(France) Sébastien Ogier					13	8											2
43	(Switzerland) Remo Lips	22	16	Ret	18	18	17	16	22	16	11	16	20	16	16	21	10	1
43	(Germany) Lennart Marioneck	22	16	Ret	18	18	17	16	22	16	11	16	20	16	16	21	10	1
44	(Switzerland) Toni Seiler	10	Ret	23	Ret	16	15	15	17	Ret	Ret	13	Ret	18	22	24	18	1
45	(Netherlands) Jeroen Bleekemolen	10	Ret	23	Ret	16	15	15	17			13	Ret					1
46	(Netherlands) Peter Kox	12	Ret	21	Ret													0
46	(Germany) Dominic Jöst	17	12	16	16	Ret	DNS	21	19	23	18	19	16	12	12	18	19	0
46	(Germany) Florian Scholze	17	12	16	16	Ret	DNS			23	18	19	16	12	12	18	19	0
46	(Switzerland) Marc A. Hayek	12	Ret															0
46	(Austria) Nikolaus Mayr-Melnhof									14	13							0
46	(Greece) Antonios Wossos	18	15	18	20	19	19	26	20	DNS	16	21	17	17	20	23	13	0
46	(Netherlands) Wolf Nathan	18	15	18	20	19	19	26	20	DNS	16	21	17	17	20	23	13	0
46	(Germany) Florian Spengler	19	14	20	19	17	20	25	15	22	14	18	Ret	14	19	17	16	0
46	(Estonia) Marko Asmer			20	19	17	20	25	15	22	14	18	Ret					0
46	(United Kingdom) Ryan Sharp	19	14															0
46	(Germany) Christopher Brück													14	19			0
46	(Spain) Alex Riberas									15	Ret							0
46	(Portugal) Álvaro Parente															17	16	0
46	(Netherlands) Sebastiaan Bleekemolen													18	22			0
46	(Sweden) Andreas Simonsen									Ret	Ret					24	18	0
46	(Germany) Stefan Wackerbauer	Ret	Ret					21	19									0
guest drivers ineligible to score points
	(Austria) Gerhard Tweraser							4	Ret	12	12							
	(Austria) Harald Proczyk							4	Ret									
	(Czech Republic) Tomáš Pivoda									12	12							
	(Germany) Christoph Dupré															22	15	
	(Germany) Thomas Schöffler															22	15	
	(Austria) Sandro Bickel							18	DNS									
	(Austria) Sascha Halek							18	DNS									
Pos.	Driver	OSC (Germany)		ZAN (Netherlands)		LAU (Germany)		RBR (Austria)		SLO (Slovakia)		NÜR (Germany)		SAC (Germany)		HOC (Germany)		Points

=== Teams' championship ===
Pos.	Driver	Points
1	(Germany) Prosperia C. Abt Racing	225
2	(Germany) Callaway Competition	221
3	(Germany) PIXUM Team Schubert	217
4	(Germany) GW IT Racing Team Schütz Motorsport	197
5	(Germany) HTP Motorsport	169
6	(Germany) Tonino Team Herberth	131
7	(Germany) Rowe Racing	102
8	(Germany) BKK Mobil Oil Racing Team Zakspeed	90
9	(Germany) Farnbacher Racing	67
10	(Germany) RWT Racing	62
11	(Germany) Reiter Engineering	60
12	(Germany) Yaco Racing	36
13	(Germany) kfzteile24 APR Motorsport	30
14	(Germany) MRS GT-Racing	5
15	(Switzerland) Blancpain Racing	0
guest teams ineligible to score points
	(Austria) GRT Grasser Racing Team	0
	(Germany) Dupré Engineering Motorsport	0
Pos.	Driver	Points
