= 2015 ADAC GT Masters =

Motorsport season

The 2015 ADAC GT Masters season was the ninth season of the ADAC GT Masters, the grand tourer-style sports car racing founded by the German automobile club ADAC. The season started on 25 April at Motorsport Arena Oschersleben and ended on 4 October at Hockenheim after eight double-header meetings. René Rast and Kelvin van der Linde entered the season as the defending Drivers' Champions. Prosperia C. Abt Racing entered the season as the defending Teams' Champion.

The series changed tyre supplier from Yokohama to Pirelli.

== Entry list ==
Team	Car	No.	Driver	Rounds
(Germany) C. Abt Racing	Audi R8 LMS ultra	1	(South Africa) Kelvin van der Linde	All
(Germany) C. Abt Racing	Audi R8 LMS ultra	1	(Germany) Stefan Wackerbauer	All
(Germany) C. Abt Racing	Audi R8 LMS ultra	2	(South Africa) Jordan Pepper	All
(Germany) C. Abt Racing	Audi R8 LMS ultra	2	(Denmark) Nicki Thiim	All
(Germany) C. Abt Racing	Audi R8 LMS ultra	3	(Germany) Christer Jöns	All
(Germany) C. Abt Racing	Audi R8 LMS ultra	3	(Germany) Andreas Weishaupt	All
(Germany) Bentley Team HTP	Bentley Continental GT3	7	(Germany) Luca Stolz	All
(Germany) Bentley Team HTP	Bentley Continental GT3	7	(Netherlands) Jeroen Bleekemolen	1–4
(Germany) Bentley Team HTP	Bentley Continental GT3	7	(France) Vincent Abril	5
(Germany) Bentley Team HTP	Bentley Continental GT3	7	(Germany) Maximilian Buhk	6
(Germany) Bentley Team HTP	Bentley Continental GT3	7	(France) Tom Dillmann	7–8
(Germany) Bentley Team HTP	Bentley Continental GT3	8	(Germany) Fabian Hamprecht	All
(Germany) Bentley Team HTP	Bentley Continental GT3	8	(Austria) Clemens Schmid	All
(Czech Republic) Šenkýř Motorsport	BMW Z4 GT3	12	(Germany) Lennart Marioneck	1–6, 8
(Czech Republic) Šenkýř Motorsport	BMW Z4 GT3	12	(Czech Republic) Jakub Knoll	1–2, 4–5
(Czech Republic) Šenkýř Motorsport	BMW Z4 GT3	12	(Slovakia) Samuel Sladecka	3
(Czech Republic) Šenkýř Motorsport	BMW Z4 GT3	12	(Finland) Markus Palttala	6
(Czech Republic) Šenkýř Motorsport	BMW Z4 GT3	12	(Austria) Michael Joos	8
(Germany) RWT Racing Team	Corvette Z06.R GT3	13	(Germany) Sven Barth	1–5, 7–8
(Germany) RWT Racing Team	Corvette Z06.R GT3	13	(Switzerland) Remo Lips	1–5, 7–8
(Germany) Lambda Performance	Ford GT GT3	14	(Germany) Frank Kechele	8
(Germany) Lambda Performance	Ford GT GT3	14	(Belgium) Nico Verdonck	8
(Germany) YACO Racing	Audi R8 LMS ultra	16	(Switzerland) Rahel Frey	All
(Germany) YACO Racing	Audi R8 LMS ultra	16	(Germany) Philip Geipel	All
(Germany) BMW Sports Trophy Team Schubert	BMW Z4 GT3	19	(Germany) Claudia Hürtgen	All
(Germany) BMW Sports Trophy Team Schubert	BMW Z4 GT3	19	(Finland) Jesse Krohn	1
(Germany) BMW Sports Trophy Team Schubert	BMW Z4 GT3	19	(Germany) Uwe Alzen	2–7
(Germany) BMW Sports Trophy Team Schubert	BMW Z4 GT3	19	(Germany) Niklas Mackschin	8
(Germany) BMW Sports Trophy Team Schubert	BMW Z4 GT3	80	(Austria) Dominik Baumann	All
(Germany) BMW Sports Trophy Team Schubert	BMW Z4 GT3	80	(Germany) Jens Klingmann	1–7
(Germany) BMW Sports Trophy Team Schubert	BMW Z4 GT3	80	(Canada) Bruno Spengler	8
(Germany) Team Zakspeed	Mercedes-Benz SLS AMG GT3	21	(Germany) Sebastian Asch	All
(Germany) Team Zakspeed	Mercedes-Benz SLS AMG GT3	21	(Germany) Luca Ludwig	All
(Germany) MRS GT-Racing	Nissan GT-R GT3	22	(Germany) Dominic Jöst	All
(Germany) MRS GT-Racing	Nissan GT-R GT3	22	(Germany) Florian Scholze	All
(Germany) MRS GT-Racing	Nissan GT-R GT3	23	(Germany) Marc Gassner	All
(Germany) MRS GT-Racing	Nissan GT-R GT3	23	(Germany) Florian Strauss	All
(Germany) kfzteile24 MS Racing	Audi R8 LMS ultra	24	(Germany) Marc Basseng	All
(Germany) kfzteile24 MS Racing	Audi R8 LMS ultra	24	(Germany) Florian Stoll	All
(Germany) kfzteile24 MS Racing	Audi R8 LMS ultra	100	(Austria) Daniel Dobitsch	All
(Germany) kfzteile24 MS Racing	Audi R8 LMS ultra	100	(Sweden) Edward Sandström	All
(Germany) Reiter Engineering	Chevrolet Camaro GT3	25	(United Kingdom) Oliver Gavin	1
(Germany) Reiter Engineering	Chevrolet Camaro GT3	25	(Czech Republic) Tomáš Enge	1
(Germany) Reiter Engineering	Lamborghini Gallardo R-EX	25	(Czech Republic) Tomáš Enge	2, 6–7
(Germany) Reiter Engineering	Lamborghini Gallardo R-EX	25	(Australia) David Russell	2–3
(Germany) Reiter Engineering	Lamborghini Gallardo R-EX	25	(Australia) Steve Owen	3
(Germany) Reiter Engineering	Lamborghini Gallardo R-EX	25	(Germany) Albert von Thurn und Taxis	6
(Germany) Reiter Engineering	Lamborghini Gallardo R-EX	25	(Netherlands) Jaap van Lagen	7
(Germany) Reiter Engineering	Lamborghini Gallardo R-EX	88	(Netherlands) Nick Catsburg	7
(Germany) Reiter Engineering	Lamborghini Gallardo R-EX	88	(Germany) Albert von Thurn und Taxis	7
(Germany) Car Collection Motorsport	Mercedes-Benz SLS AMG GT3	33	(Germany) Alexander Mattschull	5
(Germany) Car Collection Motorsport	Mercedes-Benz SLS AMG GT3	33	(Netherlands) Renger van der Zande	5
(Germany) GW IT Racing Team Schütz Motorsport	Porsche 911 GT3 R	36	(Austria) Klaus Bachler	All
(Germany) GW IT Racing Team Schütz Motorsport	Porsche 911 GT3 R	36	(Germany) Christian Engelhart	1, 8
(Germany) GW IT Racing Team Schütz Motorsport	Porsche 911 GT3 R	36	(Austria) Philipp Eng	2
(Germany) GW IT Racing Team Schütz Motorsport	Porsche 911 GT3 R	36	(Austria) Martin Ragginger	3–7
(Switzerland) HP Racing	Mercedes-Benz SLS AMG GT3	42	(Austria) Harald Proczyk	All
(Switzerland) HP Racing	Mercedes-Benz SLS AMG GT3	42	(Sweden) Andreas Simonsen	1–2, 4, 6
(Switzerland) HP Racing	Mercedes-Benz SLS AMG GT3	42	(Germany) Bernd Schneider	3, 5, 7–8
(Austria) Grasser Racing Team	Lamborghini Huracán GT3	63	(Italy) Mirko Bortolotti	2
(Austria) Grasser Racing Team	Lamborghini Huracán GT3	63	(South Africa) Adrian Zaugg	2
(Germany) Callaway Competition	Corvette Z06.R GT3	66	(Germany) Daniel Keilwitz	All
(Germany) Callaway Competition	Corvette Z06.R GT3	66	(Germany) Andreas Wirth	All
(Germany) Callaway Competition	Corvette Z06.R GT3	69	(Germany) Patrick Assenheimer	All
(Germany) Callaway Competition	Corvette Z06.R GT3	69	(Italy) Diego Alessi	1–7
(Germany) Callaway Competition	Corvette Z06.R GT3	69	(Sweden) Andreas Simonsen	8
(Germany) Tonino Team Herberth	Porsche 911 GT3 R	99	(Germany) René Bourdeaux	3
(Germany) Tonino Team Herberth	Porsche 911 GT3 R	99	(Germany) Alfred Renauer	3
(Germany) Rowe Racing	Mercedes-Benz SLS AMG GT3	99	(Germany) Nico Bastian	5
(Germany) Rowe Racing	Mercedes-Benz SLS AMG GT3	99	(Netherlands) Stef Dusseldorp	5

== Race calendar and results ==
The eight-event calendar for the 2015 season was announced on 21 November 2014.

Round		Circuit	Date	Pole position	Race winner
1	R1	(Germany) Motorsport Arena Oschersleben	25 April	(Germany) No. 7 Bentley Team HTP	(Germany) No. 36 GW IT Racing Team Schütz Motorsport
1	R1	(Germany) Motorsport Arena Oschersleben	25 April	(Netherlands) Jeroen Bleekemolen (Germany) Luca Stolz	(Austria) Klaus Bachler (Germany) Christian Engelhart
1	R2	(Germany) Motorsport Arena Oschersleben	26 April	(Germany) No. 7 Bentley Team HTP	(Germany) No. 7 Bentley Team HTP
1	R2	(Germany) Motorsport Arena Oschersleben	26 April	(Netherlands) Jeroen Bleekemolen (Germany) Luca Stolz	(Netherlands) Jeroen Bleekemolen (Germany) Luca Stolz
2	R1	(Austria) Red Bull Ring	6 June	(Germany) No. 36 GW IT Racing Team Schütz Motorsport	(Germany) No. 25 Reiter Engineering
2	R1	(Austria) Red Bull Ring	6 June	(Austria) Klaus Bachler (Austria) Philipp Eng	(Czech Republic) Tomáš Enge (Australia) David Russell
2	R2	(Austria) Red Bull Ring	7 June	(Germany) No. 25 Reiter Engineering	(Austria) No. 63 Grasser Racing Team
2	R2	(Austria) Red Bull Ring	7 June	(Czech Republic) Tomáš Enge (Australia) David Russell	(Italy) Mirko Bortolotti (South Africa) Adrian Zaugg
3	R1	(Belgium) Circuit de Spa-Francorchamps	20 June	(Germany) No. 21 Team Zakspeed	(Germany) No. 80 BMW Sports Trophy Team Schubert
3	R1	(Belgium) Circuit de Spa-Francorchamps	20 June	(Germany) Sebastian Asch (Germany) Luca Ludwig	(Austria) Dominik Baumann (Germany) Jens Klingmann
3	R2	(Belgium) Circuit de Spa-Francorchamps	21 June	(Switzerland) No. 42 HP Racing	(Germany) No. 21 Team Zakspeed
3	R2	(Belgium) Circuit de Spa-Francorchamps	21 June	(Austria) Harald Proczyk (Germany) Bernd Schneider	(Germany) Sebastian Asch (Germany) Luca Ludwig
4	R1	(Germany) Lausitzring	4 July	(Germany) No. 36 GW IT Racing Team Schütz Motorsport	(Germany) No. 80 BMW Sports Trophy Team Schubert
4	R1	(Germany) Lausitzring	4 July	(Austria) Klaus Bachler (Austria) Martin Ragginger	(Austria) Dominik Baumann (Germany) Jens Klingmann
4	R2	(Germany) Lausitzring	5 July	(Germany) No. 21 Team Zakspeed	(Germany) No. 21 Team Zakspeed
4	R2	(Germany) Lausitzring	5 July	(Germany) Sebastian Asch (Germany) Luca Ludwig	(Germany) Sebastian Asch (Germany) Luca Ludwig
5	R1	(Germany) Nürburgring	15 August	(Germany) No. 36 GW IT Racing Team Schütz Motorsport	(Germany) No. 100 kfzteile24 MS Racing
5	R1	(Germany) Nürburgring	15 August	(Austria) Klaus Bachler (Austria) Martin Ragginger	(Austria) Daniel Dobitsch (Sweden) Edward Sandström
5	R2	(Germany) Nürburgring	16 August	(Germany) No. 36 GW IT Racing Team Schütz Motorsport	(Germany) No. 24 kfzteile24 MS Racing
5	R2	(Germany) Nürburgring	16 August	(Austria) Klaus Bachler (Austria) Martin Ragginger	(Germany) Marc Basseng (Germany) Florian Stoll
6	R1	(Germany) Sachsenring	29 August	(Germany) No. 19 BMW Sports Trophy Team Schubert	(Germany) No. 80 BMW Sports Trophy Team Schubert
6	R1	(Germany) Sachsenring	29 August	(Germany) Uwe Alzen (Germany) Claudia Hürtgen	(Austria) Dominik Baumann (Germany) Jens Klingmann
6	R2	(Germany) Sachsenring	30 August	(Germany) No. 36 GW IT Racing Team Schütz Motorsport	(Germany) No. 1 C. Abt Racing
6	R2	(Germany) Sachsenring	30 August	(Austria) Klaus Bachler (Austria) Martin Ragginger	(South Africa) Kelvin van der Linde (Germany) Stefan Wackerbauer
7	R1	(Netherlands) Circuit Park Zandvoort	19 September	(Germany) No. 36 GW IT Racing Team Schütz Motorsport	(Germany) No. 21 Team Zakspeed
7	R1	(Netherlands) Circuit Park Zandvoort	19 September	(Austria) Klaus Bachler (Austria) Martin Ragginger	(Germany) Sebastian Asch (Germany) Luca Ludwig
7	R2	(Netherlands) Circuit Park Zandvoort	20 September	(Germany) No. 80 BMW Sports Trophy Team Schubert	(Germany) No. 80 BMW Sports Trophy Team Schubert
7	R2	(Netherlands) Circuit Park Zandvoort	20 September	(Austria) Dominik Baumann (Germany) Jens Klingmann	(Austria) Dominik Baumann (Germany) Jens Klingmann
8	R1	(Germany) Hockenheimring	3 October	(Germany) No. 7 Bentley Team HTP	(Germany) No. 16 YACO Racing
8	R1	(Germany) Hockenheimring	3 October	(Germany) Luca Stolz (France) Tom Dillmann	(Switzerland) Rahel Frey (Germany) Philip Geipel
8	R2	(Germany) Hockenheimring	4 October	(Germany) No. 14 Lambda Performance	(Germany) No. 2 C. Abt Racing
8	R2	(Germany) Hockenheimring	4 October	(Germany) Frank Kechele (Belgium) Nico Verdonck	(South Africa) Jordan Pepper (Denmark) Nicki Thiim

== Championship standings ==
Scoring system

Championship points were awarded for the first ten positions in each race. Entries were required to complete 75% of the winning car's race distance in order to be classified and earn points. Individual drivers were required to participate for a minimum of 25 minutes in order to earn championship points in any race.

Position	**1st**	**2nd**	**3rd**	**4th**	**5th**	**6th**	**7th**	**8th**	**9th**	**10th**
Points	25	18	15	12	10	8	6	4	2	1

=== Drivers' championship ===
Pos.	Driver	Team	OSC (Germany)		RBR (Austria)		SPA (Belgium)		LAU (Germany)		NÜR (Germany)		SAC (Germany)		ZAN (Netherlands)		HOC (Germany)		Total
1	(Germany) Sebastian Asch (Germany) Luca Ludwig	(Germany) Team Zakspeed	2	2	3	4	**2**	1	4	**1**	9	10	5	17	1	11	Ret	5	199
2	(Austria) Dominik Baumann	(Germany) BMW Sports Trophy Team Schubert	5	7	Ret	Ret	1	5	1	4	12	4	1	8	10	**1**	4	3	186
3	(Germany) Jens Klingmann	(Germany) BMW Sports Trophy Team Schubert	5	7	Ret	Ret	1	5	1	4	12	4	1	8	10	**1**			156
4	(Austria) Klaus Bachler	(Germany) GW IT Racing Team Schütz Motorsport	1	4	**5**	3	4	8	**5**	3	**Ret**	**3**	9	**3**	**11**	5	Ret	Ret	150
5	(Austria) Harald Proczyk	(Switzerland) HP Racing	3	3	Ret	Ret	7	**10**	2	Ret	4	5	6	5	6	8	Ret	13	109
6	(Germany) Marc Basseng (Germany) Florian Stoll	(Germany) kfzteile24 MS Racing	12	11	9	16	8	3	8	6	16	1	Ret	6	2	4	Ret	8	107
7	(Germany) Daniel Keilwitz (Germany) Andreas Wirth	(Germany) Callaway Competition	4	14	2	12	12	2	9	2	19	Ret	3	10	7	Ret	5	9	104
8	(Austria) Daniel Dobitsch (Sweden) Edward Sandström	(Germany) kfzteile24 MS Racing	Ret	9	Ret	10	6	16	Ret	5	1	2	14	Ret	8	6	6	4	102
9	(Germany) Luca Stolz	(Germany) Bentley Team HTP	**11**	**1**	13	5	3	15	6	7	13	7	Ret	4	4	9	**Ret**	11	101
10	(Switzerland) Rahel Frey (Germany) Philip Geipel	(Germany) YACO Racing	7	Ret	11	11	16	7	10	10	2	11	Ret	7	3	10	1	6	92
11	(Germany) Claudia Hürtgen	(Germany) BMW Sports Trophy Team Schubert	6	5	8	9	5	6	3	8	6	Ret	**2**	14	13	Ret	Ret	DNS	91
12	(South Africa) Jordan Pepper (Denmark) Nicki Thiim	(Germany) C. Abt Racing	8	15	12	13	11	4	11	14	5	Ret	Ret	9	5	3	8	1	87
13	(Austria) Martin Ragginger	(Germany) GW IT Racing Team Schütz Motorsport					4	8	**5**	3	**Ret**	**3**	9	**3**	**11**	5			85
14	(South Africa) Kelvin van der Linde (Germany) Stefan Wackerbauer	(Germany) C. Abt Racing	17	6	10	17	Ret	11	Ret	12	3	Ret	Ret	1	Ret	7	3	7	81
15	(Germany) Uwe Alzen	(Germany) BMW Sports Trophy Team Schubert			8	9	5	6	3	8	6	Ret	**2**	14	13	Ret			73
16	(Netherlands) Jeroen Bleekemolen	(Germany) Bentley Team HTP	**11**	**1**	13	5	3	15	6	7									66
17	(Sweden) Andreas Simonsen	(Switzerland) HP Racing	3	3	Ret	Ret			2	Ret			6	5					66
17	(Sweden) Andreas Simonsen	(Germany) Callaway Competition															12	Ret	66
18	(Czech Republic) Tomáš Enge	(Germany) Reiter Engineering	10	Ret	1	**2**							8	16	DSQ	13			55
19	(Germany) Fabian Hamprecht (Austria) Clemens Schmid	(Germany) Bentley Team HTP	16	DNS	Ret	8	14	17	7	9	14	9	13	2	Ret	12	2	Ret	52
20	(Australia) David Russell	(Germany) Reiter Engineering			1	**2**	DNS	DNS											50
21	(Germany) Bernd Schneider	(Switzerland) HP Racing					7	**10**			4	5			6	8	Ret	13	43
22	(Germany) Christian Engelhart	(Germany) GW IT Racing Team Schütz Motorsport	1	4													Ret	Ret	37
23	(Germany) Patrick Assenheimer	(Germany) Callaway Competition	Ret	13	4	15	9	14	Ret	Ret	7	12	4	15	Ret	DNS	12	Ret	32
24	(Italy) Diego Alessi	(Germany) Callaway Competition	Ret	13	4	15	9	14	Ret	Ret	7	12	4	15	Ret	DNS			32
25	(Canada) Bruno Spengler	(Germany) BMW Sports Trophy Team Schubert															4	3	30
26	(Austria) Philipp Eng	(Germany) GW IT Racing Team Schütz Motorsport			**5**	3													28
27	(Germany) Sven Barth (Switzerland) Remo Lips	(Germany) RWT Racing Team	15	10	7	7	10	12	13	11	Ret	14			12	15	13	10	20
28	(Germany) Christer Jöns (Germany) Andreas Weishaupt	(Germany) C. Abt Racing	18	12	14	Ret	13	9	14	Ret	17	6	7	Ret	9	14	10	12	20
29	(Finland) Jesse Krohn	(Germany) BMW Sports Trophy Team Schubert	6	5															18
30	(France) Tom Dillmann	(Germany) Bentley Team HTP													4	9	**Ret**	11	17
31	(Germany) Dominic Jöst (Germany) Florian Scholze	(Germany) MRS GT-Racing	13	8	Ret	6	17	13	WD	WD	18	15	10	12	WD	WD	WD	WD	15
32	(Germany) Maximilian Buhk	(Germany) Bentley Team HTP											Ret	4					12
33	(Germany) Marc Gassner (Germany) Florian Strauss	(Germany) MRS GT-Racing	9	Ret	Ret	18	18	DNS	WD	WD	10	8	11	13	15	Ret	9	Ret	12
34	(France) Vincent Abril	(Germany) Bentley Team HTP									13	7							6
35	(Germany) Albert von Thurn und Taxis	(Germany) Reiter Engineering											8	16	14^{1}	2^{1}			4
36	(United Kingdom) Oliver Gavin	(Germany) Reiter Engineering	10	Ret															1
37	(Germany) Lennart Marioneck	(Czech Republic) Šenkýř Motorsport	14	Ret	Ret	14	15	18	12	13	15	17	12	11			11	Ret	1
38	(Austria) Michael Joos	(Czech Republic) Šenkýř Motorsport															11	Ret	1
	(Finland) Markus Palttala	(Czech Republic) Šenkýř Motorsport											12	11					0
	(Czech Republic) Jakub Knoll	(Czech Republic) Šenkýř Motorsport	14	Ret	Ret	14			12	13	15	17							0
	(Slovakia) Samuel Sladecka	(Czech Republic) Šenkýř Motorsport					15	18											0
	(Germany) René Bourdeaux (Germany) Alfred Renauer	(Germany) Tonino Team Herberth					19	19											0
	(Germany) Niklas Mackschin	(Germany) BMW Sports Trophy Team Schubert															Ret	DNS	0
	(Australia) Steve Owen	(Germany) Reiter Engineering					DNS	DNS											0
Guest drivers ineligible for points
	(Italy) Mirko Bortolotti (South Africa) Adrian Zaugg	(Austria) Grasser Racing Team			6	1													
	(Germany) Frank Kechele (Belgium) Nico Verdonck	(Germany) Lambda Performance															7	**2**	
	(Netherlands) Nick Catsburg	(Germany) Reiter Engineering													14	2			
	(Germany) Alexander Mattschull (Netherlands) Renger van der Zande	(Germany) Car Collection Motorsport									8	16							
	(Germany) Nico Bastian (Netherlands) Stef Dusseldorp	(Germany) Rowe Racing									11	13							
	(Netherlands) Jaap van Lagen	(Germany) Reiter Engineering													DSQ	13			

Key
Colour	Result
Gold	Race winner
Silver	2nd place
Bronze	3rd place
Green	Points finish
Blue	Non-points finish
Blue	Non-classified finish (NC)
Purple	Did not finish (Ret)
Black	Disqualified (DSQ)
Black	Excluded (EX)
White	Did not start (DNS)
White	Race cancelled (C)
White	Withdrew (WD)
Blank	Did not participate

**Bold** – Pole

Notes

- ^{1} – Albert von Thurn und Taxis was a guest driver at Zandvoort and therefore ineligible to score championship points.

=== Teams' championship ===
Pos.	Team	Manufacturer	OSC (Germany)		RBR (Austria)		SPA (Belgium)		LAU (Germany)		NÜR (Germany)		SAC (Germany)		ZAN (Netherlands)		HOC (Germany)		Total
1	(Germany) BMW Sports Trophy Team Schubert	BMW	5	5	8	9	1	5	1	4	6	4	**1**	8	10	**1**	4	3	221
2	(Germany) Team Zakspeed	Mercedes-Benz	2	2	3	4	**2**	1	4	**1**	9	10	5	17	1	11	Ret	5	215
3	(Germany) kfzteile24 MS Racing	Audi	12	9	9	10	6	3	8	5	1	1	14	6	2	4	6	4	173
4	(Germany) GW IT Racing Team Schütz Motorsport	Porsche	1	4	**5**	3	4	8	**5**	3	**Ret**	**3**	9	**3**	**11**	5	Ret	Ret	165
5	(Germany) C. Abt Racing	Audi	8	6	10	13	11	4	11	12	3	6	7	1	5	3	3	1	164
6	(Germany) Bentley Team HTP	Bentley	**11**	**1**	13	5	3	15	6	7	13	7	13	2	4	9	**2**	11	143
7	(Germany) Callaway Competition	Chevrolet	4	13	2	12	9	2	9	2	7	12	3	10	7	Ret	5	9	135
8	(Switzerland) HP Racing	Mercedes-Benz	3	3	Ret	Ret	7	**10**	2	Ret	4	5	6	5	6	8	Ret	13	128
9	(Germany) YACO Racing	Audi	7	Ret	11	11	16	7	10	10	2	11	Ret	7	3	10	1	6	114
10	(Germany) Reiter Engineering	Chevrolet	10	Ret															62
10	(Germany) Reiter Engineering	Lamborghini			1	**2**	DNS	DNS					8	16	DSQ	13			62
11	(Germany) MRS GT-Racing	Nissan	9	8	Ret	6	17	13	WD	WD	10	8	10	12	15	Ret	9	Ret	42
12	(Germany) RWT Racing Team	Chevrolet	15	10	7	7	10	12	13	11	Ret	14			12	15	13	10	40
13	(Czech Republic) Šenkýř Motorsport	BMW	14	Ret	Ret	14	15	18	12	13	15	17	12	11			11	Ret	12
	(Germany) Tonino Team Herberth	Porsche					19	19											0
Guest teams ineligible for points
	(Austria) Grasser Racing Team	Lamborghini			6	1													
	(Germany) Lambda Performance	Ford															7	**2**	
	(Germany) Car Collection Motorsport	Mercedes-Benz									8	16							
	(Germany) Rowe Racing	Mercedes-Benz									11	13							

Key
Colour	Result
Gold	Race winner
Silver	2nd place
Bronze	3rd place
Green	Points finish
Blue	Non-points finish
Blue	Non-classified finish (NC)
Purple	Did not finish (Ret)
Black	Disqualified (DSQ)
Black	Excluded (EX)
White	Did not start (DNS)
White	Race cancelled (C)
White	Withdrew (WD)
Blank	Did not participate

**Bold** – Pole
