= Sebastian Asch =

German racing driver (born 1986)

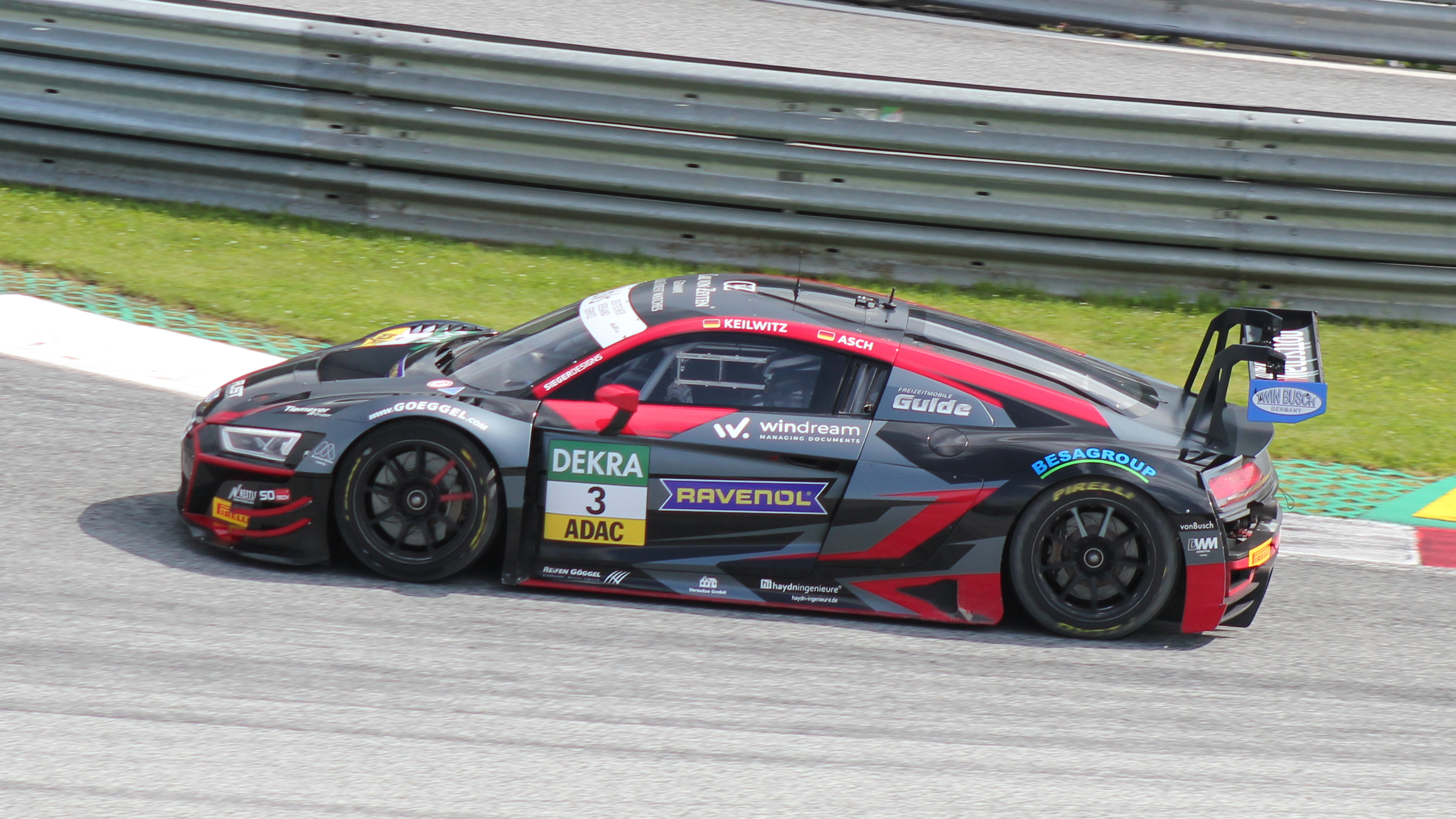
- Asch in 2021
- Nationality: (Germany) German
- Born: 4 June 1986 (age 40) Tübingen, Baden-Württemberg, Germany
- Relatives: Roland Asch (father)
- Categorisation: FIA Silver (until 2015); FIA Gold (2016–)

Sebastian Asch (born 4 June 1986) is a German race car driver. He is a double ADAC GT Masters champion, and the son of Roland Asch.

Starting his career in slalom and karting, Asch drove in the 2004 German Ford Fiesta Cup, driving the No. 8 car. Asch raced in the German SEAT León Cup from 2005 to 2007, then making a debut in the ADAC GT Masters in 2008. He was twice ADAC GT Masters champion, in 2012 with Maximilian Götz and in 2015 with Luca Ludwig, both times driving a Mercedes-Benz SLS AMG GT3.

== Racing record ==
=== Complete ADAC GT Masters results ===
(key) (Races in bold indicate pole position) (Races in italics indicate fastest lap)

Year	Team	Car	1	2	3	4	5	6	7	8	9	10	11	12	13	14	15	16	DC	Points
2008	Argo Racing	Lamborghini Gallardo GT3	OSC; 1; 5	OSC; 2; 7	**NÜR1**; **1**; 2	NÜR1; 2 Ret	NOR; 1; 9	NOR; 2; 11	ASS; 1; 8	ASS; 2; 4	NÜR2; 1; 5	NÜR2; 2; 3	LAU; 1; 4	LAU; 2; 3	**SAC**; **1** Ret	SAC; 2; 14			4th	44
2010	a-workx/Wieth Racing	Porsche 997 GT3-R	OSC1; 1; 1	OSC1; 2; 3	SAC; 1; 15	SAC; 2; 15	**HOC**; **1**; 4	HOC; 2 Ret	ASS; 1; 5	ASS; 2; 8	LAU; 1; 9	LAU; 2; 5	NÜR; 1; 3	NÜR; 2; 2	OSC2; 1 DNS	OSC2; 2 DSQ			7th	44
2011	a-workx Akrapovič	Porsche 911 GT3 R	OSC; 1; 11	OSC; 2 Ret	SAC; 1; 3	SAC; 2; 8	ZOL; 1; 10	ZOL; 2; 27	NÜR; 1; 4	NÜR; 2; 10	RBR; 1; 7	RBR; 2 Ret	LAU; 1; 1	LAU; 2 Ret	ASS; 1; 16	ASS; 2; 21	HOC; 1 Ret	HOC; 2; 11	16th	64
2012	kfzteile24 MS Racing Team	Mercedes-Benz SLS AMG GT3	OSC; 1; 9	OSC; 2; 7	ZAN; 1; 2	ZAN; 2; 3	SAC; 1; 3	SAC; 2; 14	**NÜR**; **1**; 7	**NÜR**; **2**; 2	RBR; 1; 9	RBR; 2; 11	LAU; 1; 2	LAU; 2; 4	NÜR; 1; 3	NÜR; 2; 3	HOC; 1; 26	HOC; 2; 1	1st	167
2013	MS Racing	Audi R8 LMS ultra	OSC; 1; 20	OSC; 2; 12	SPA; 1; 11	SPA; 2; 20	SAC; 1; 7	SAC; 2; 8	NÜR; 1; 14	NÜR; 2; 8	RBR; 1; 14	RBR; 2; 12	LAU; 1; 9	LAU; 2 Ret	SVK; 1; 15	SVK; 2 Ret	HOC; 1; 8	HOC; 2; 5	18th	30
2014	Farnbacher Racing	Porsche 911 GT3 R	OSC; 1; 13	OSC; 2; 11	ZAN; 1; 10	ZAN; 2; 8	LAU; 1 Ret	LAU; 2; 4	RBR; 1; 12	RBR; 2; 21	SLO; 1; 13	SLO; 2 Ret	NÜR; 1 Ret	NÜR; 2 Ret	SAC; 1; 4	SAC; 2; 21	HOC; 1; 7	HOC; 2 DSQ	25th	35
2015	Team Zakspeed	Mercedes-Benz SLS AMG GT3	OSC; 1; 2	OSC; 2; 2	RBR; 1; 3	RBR; 2; 4	**SPA**; **1**; 2	SPA; 2; 1	LAU; 1; 4	**LAU**; **2**; 1	NÜR; 1; 9	NÜR; 2; 10	SAC; 1; 5	SAC; 2; 17	ZAN; 1; 1	ZAN; 2; 11	HOC; 1 Ret	HOC; 2; 5	1st	199
2016	AMG - Team Zakspeed	Mercedes-AMG GT3	OSC; 1; 1	**OSC**; **2**; 22	SAC; 1; 1	**SAC**; **2**; 8	LAU; 1; 32	LAU; 2; 24	RBR; 1; 5	RBR; 2; 3	NÜR; 1; 17	NÜR; 2; 5	ZAN; 1 Ret	ZAN; 2; 3	HOC; 1; 7	HOC; 2; 12			6th	110
2017	BWT Mücke Motorsport	Mercedes-AMG GT3	OSC; 1; 6	OSC; 2; 11	LAU; 1; 8	LAU; 2; 12	RBR; 1; 4	RBR; 2; 2	ZAN; 1; 4	ZAN; 2; 15	NÜR; 1; 1	NÜR; 2; 13	SAC; 1; 12	SAC; 2; 1	HOC; 1; 19	HOC; 2 Ret			6th	104
2018	Team Zakspeed BKK Mobil Oil Racing	Mercedes-AMG GT3	OSC; 1; 4	OSC; 2; 17	MST; 1; 7	MST; 2 Ret	RBR; 1; 13	RBR; 2; 5	NÜR; 1; 4	NÜR; 2; 9	ZAN; 1; 14	ZAN; 2 Ret	SAC; 1; 18	SAC; 2; 26	HOC; 1; 27	HOC; 2; 16			15th	42
2019	HB Racing	Ferrari 488 GT3	OSC; 1; 10	OSC; 2; 15	MST; 1; 11	MST; 2; 8	RBR; 1; 10	RBR; 2 Ret	ZAN; 1; 16	ZAN; 2; 12	NÜR; 1; 7	NÜR; 2; 4	HOC; 1; 21	HOC; 2; 18	SAC; 1; 15	SAC; 2; 7			15th	67
2020	Precote Herberth Motorsport	Porsche 911 GT3 R	LAU1; 1; 10	LAU1; 2; 18	NÜR; 1; 13	NÜR; 2; 13	HOC; 1 Ret	HOC; 2 Ret	SAC; 1; 13	SAC; 2 Ret	RBR; 1; 23	RBR; 2; 19	LAU2; 1; 12	LAU2; 2; 3	OSC; 1; 9	OSC; 2 Ret			21st	43
2021	Aust Motorsport	Audi R8 LMS Evo	OSC; 1; 16	OSC; 2; 17	RBR; 1; 22	RBR; 2; 19	ZAN; 1 Ret	ZAN; 2; 17	LAU; 1; 12	LAU; 2; 10	SAC; 1 Ret	SAC; 2 DNS	HOC; 1; 16	HOC; 2; 11	NÜR; 1; 21	NÜR; 2; 17			34th	15

Sporting positions
Preceded by Dino Lunardi; Alexandros Margaritis	ADAC GT Masters Champion; 2012 with: Maximilian Götz	Succeeded by Diego Alessi; Daniel Keilwitz
Preceded by René Rast; Kelvin van der Linde	ADAC GT Masters Champion; 2015 with: Luca Ludwig	Succeeded by Christopher Mies; Connor De Phillippi
