= Stefan Wackerbauer =

German racing driver (born 1995)

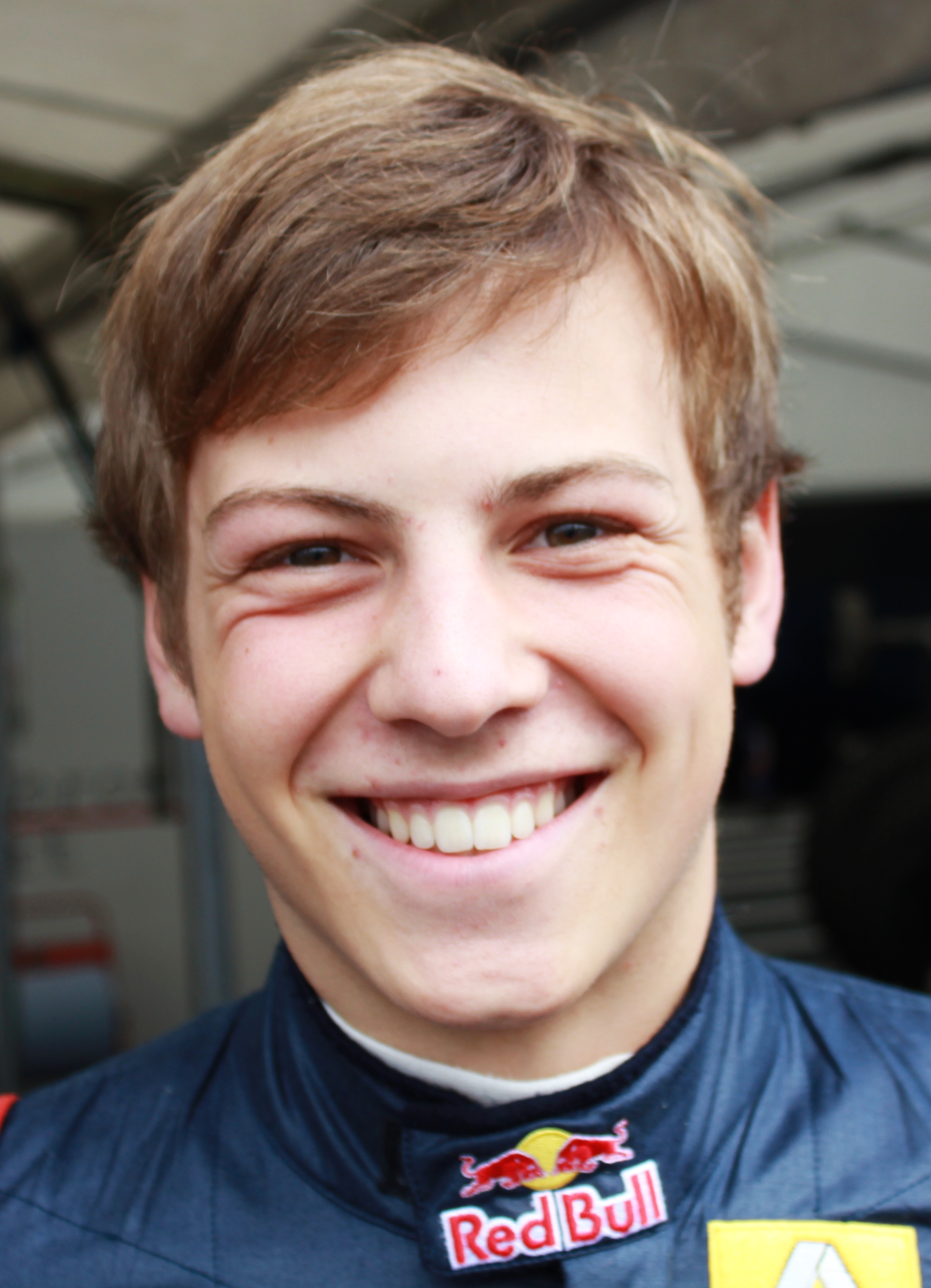
- Wackerbauer in 2012
- Born: 2 November 1995 (age 30) Gundihausen, Bavaria, Germany

Stefan Wackerbauer (born 2 November 1995) is a German former racing driver who competed in junior open-wheel racing and later transitioned to sports car racing. He is known for his dominance in the Formula BMW Talent Cup in 2011, his membership in the Red Bull Junior Team from 2012, and his participation in the ADAC GT Masters, where he secured a race win in 2015.

== Racing career ==
=== Early life and karting ===
Wackerbauer was born on 2 November 1995 in Gundihausen, Bavaria, Germany. He began his motorsport career in karting, but did not compete at the highest international levels.

=== Junior Formula career ===
In 2011, Wackerbauer transitioned to single-seater racing by winning the Formula BMW Talent Cup, a shootout series organized by BMW Motorsport. He dominated the season, securing victories in nearly every qualifying and race heat.

Wackerbauer's success led to his inclusion in the Red Bull Junior Team in 2012.

As part of the program, Wackerbauer competed in the Formula Renault 2.0 Eurocup with Koiranen Motorsport.

Wackerbauer later moved to German Formula 3.

=== Sports car racing ===
In 2014, Wackerbauer shifted from open-wheel racing to sports cars, joining the ADAC GT Masters series. He partnered with former Formula 1 driver Markus Winkelhock in an Audi R8 LMS ultra for Team C. Abt Racing.

The following year, in 2015, Wackerbauer teamed up with South African driver Kelvin van der Linde in the same series and car. The duo achieved a maiden victory at the Sachsenring, starting from fourth position and clinching the win in race two.

Wackerbauer finished the season with 81 points, placing 14th in the championship standings.

== Racing record ==
=== Racing career summary ===
Season	Series	Team	Races	Wins	Poles	F/Laps	Podiums	Points	Position
2011	Formula BMW Talent Cup	BMW Motorsport	13	13	2	0	13	?	1st
2011	Protyre Formula Renault UK Finals Series	Koiranen Motorsport	6	0	0	0	0	37	19th
2012	Eurocup Formula Renault 2.0	Koiranen Motorsport	14	0	0	0	0	32	11th
2012	Formula Renault 2.0 Alps Series	Koiranen Motorsport	14	0	0	0	1	41	12th
2013	Eurocup Formula Renault 2.0	Interwetten Racing	4	0	0	0	0	4	21st
2014	ADAC GT Masters	Prosperia C. Abt Racing	2	0	0	0	0	0	NC
2014	ADAC GT Masters	Tonino Team Herberth	2	0	0	0	0	0	NC
2015	ADAC GT Masters	C. Abt Racing	16	1	0	0	3	81	14th

=== Complete Eurocup Formula Renault 2.0 results ===
(key) (Races in bold indicate pole position) (Races in italics indicate fastest lap)

Year	Entrant	1	2	3	4	5	6	7	8	9	10	11	12	13	14	Pos	Points
2012	Koiranen Motorsport	ALC; 1; 11	ALC; 2; 28	SPA; 1; 9	SPA; 2 Ret	NÜR; 1 Ret	NÜR; 2 Ret	MSC; 1; 4	MSC; 2; 6	HUN; 1; 14	HUN; 2; 9	LEC; 1; 6	LEC; 2; 11	CAT; 1; 16	CAT; 2; 13	11th	32
2013	Interwetten Racing	ALC; 1; 13	ALC; 2; 18	SPA; 1; 9	SPA; 2 Ret	MSC; 1	MSC; 2	RBR; 1	RBR; 2	HUN; 1	HUN; 2	LEC; 1	LEC; 2	CAT; 1	CAT; 2	21st	4

=== Complete Formula Renault 2.0 Alps Series results ===
(key) (Races in bold indicate pole position; races in italics indicate fastest lap)

Year	Team	1	2	3	4	5	6	7	8	9	10	11	12	13	14	Pos	Points
2012	Koiranen Motorsport	MNZ; 1; 15	MNZ; 2; 25	PAU; 1; 8	PAU; 2; 24	IMO; 1 Ret	IMO; 2; 3	SPA; 1; 9	SPA; 2; 6	RBR; 1; 7	RBR; 2; 14	MUG; 1; 7	MUG; 2; 14	CAT; 1 Ret	CAT; 2; 20	12th	41

=== Complete ADAC GT Masters results ===
(key) (Races in bold indicate pole position) (Races in italics indicate fastest lap)

Year	Team	Car	1	2	3	4	5	6	7	8	9	10	11	12	13	14	15	16	DC	Points
2015	C. Abt Racing	Audi R8 LMS Ultra	OSC; 1; 17	OSC; 2; 6	RBR; 1; 10	RBR; 2; 17	SPA; 1 Ret	SPA; 2; 11	LAU; 1 Ret	LAU; 2; 12	NÜR; 1; 3	NÜR; 2 Ret	SAC; 1 Ret	SAC; 2; 1	ZAN; 1 Ret	ZAN; 2; 7	HOC; 1; 3	HOC; 2; 7	14th	81
