= 2011 Formula BMW Talent Cup =

Seasons
- ← none 2012 →

The 2011 Formula BMW Talent Cup was the first Formula BMW Talent Cup season. The series champion will receive a fully paid entry to the 2012 German Formula Three Championship.

== Drivers ==
| No | Driver | Rounds |
|---|---|---|
| 2 | (Germany) Stefan Wackerbauer | All |
| 3 | (South Africa) Liam Petrus Venter | All |
| 4 | (Finland) Lassi Halminen | All |
| 5 | (Switzerland) Prinz Max Walter zu Schaumburg-Lippe | All |
| 6 | (Germany) Max Edelhoff | All |
| 7 | (Germany) Maximilian Günther | All |
| 8 | (Germany) Lukas Schreier | All |
| 9 | (Switzerland) Kevin Jörg | All |
| 11 | (Lithuania) Airidas Siaurys | All |
| 14 | (France) Alice Brasseur | All |
| 15 | (Switzerland) Darius Oskiou | All |
| 16 | (Spain) Alexander Carbonell | All |
| 17 | (Germany) Felix Schindler | All |

== Race calendar ==
- The five-round calendar for the 2011 season was announced on 29 December 2010. The Oschersleben round was later converted to a single-race "Grand Final" on the support package of the DTM.

| Round | | Circuit | Date | Race winner |
|---|---|---|---|---|
| 1 | R1 | (Sweden) Sturup Raceway, Svedala | 18 June | (Germany) Stefan Wackerbauer |
| 1 | R2 | (Sweden) Sturup Raceway, Svedala | 18 June | (Germany) Stefan Wackerbauer |
| 1 | R3 | (Sweden) Sturup Raceway, Svedala | 19 June | (Germany) Stefan Wackerbauer |
| 1 | R4 | (Sweden) Sturup Raceway, Svedala | 19 June | (Germany) Stefan Wackerbauer |
| 2 | R1 | (France) Circuit de Nevers Magny-Cours | 26 July | (Germany) Stefan Wackerbauer |
| 2 | R2 | (France) Circuit de Nevers Magny-Cours | 26 July | (Germany) Stefan Wackerbauer |
| 3 | R1 | (Spain) Circuito Monteblanco, Huelva | 6 August | (Germany) Maximilian Günther |
| 3 | R2 | (Spain) Circuito Monteblanco, Huelva | 6 August | (Germany) Stefan Wackerbauer |
| 3 | R3 | (Spain) Circuito Monteblanco, Huelva | 7 August | (Germany) Stefan Wackerbauer |
| 3 | R4 | (Spain) Circuito Monteblanco, Huelva | 7 August | (Germany) Stefan Wackerbauer |
| 4 | R1 | (Portugal) Autódromo Internacional do Algarve, Portimão | 27 August | (Germany) Stefan Wackerbauer |
| 4 | R2 | (Portugal) Autódromo Internacional do Algarve, Portimão | 27 August | (Germany) Stefan Wackerbauer |
| 4 | R3 | (Portugal) Autódromo Internacional do Algarve, Portimão | 28 August | (Germany) Stefan Wackerbauer |
| 4 | R4 | (Portugal) Autódromo Internacional do Algarve, Portimão | 28 August | (Germany) Maximilian Günther |
| 4 | R5 | (Portugal) Autódromo Internacional do Algarve, Portimão | 28 August | (Germany) Stefan Wackerbauer |
Grand Final
| 5 | | (Germany) Motorsport Arena Oschersleben | 18 September | (Germany) Stefan Wackerbauer |
