= Daniel Keilwitz =

German racing driver (born 1989)

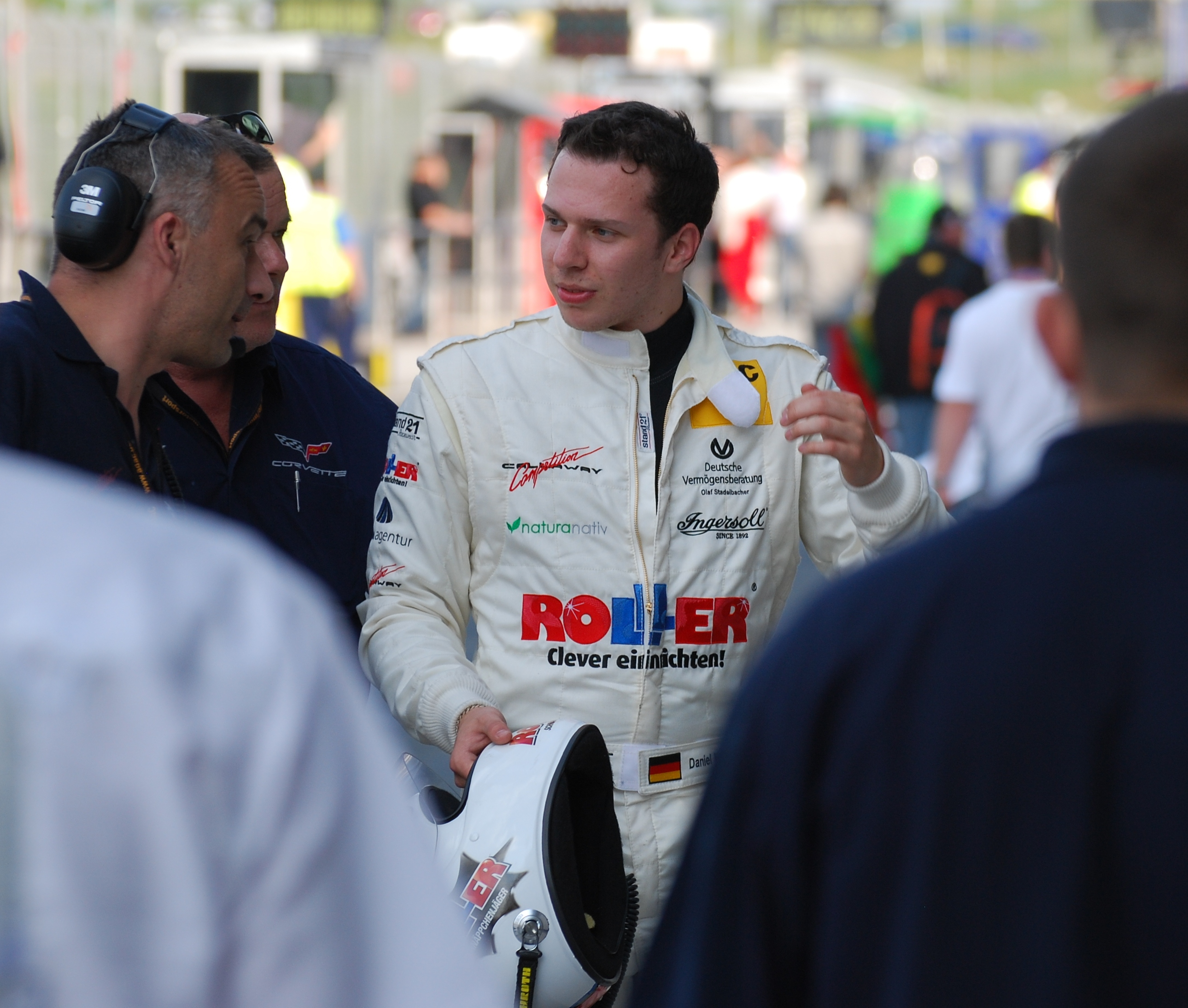
- Keilwitz in 2011
- Nationality: (Germany) German
- Born: 3 August 1989 (age 37) Villingen-Schwenningen, Germany
- Categorisation: FIA Gold

Championship titles
- 2013 2010: ADAC GT Masters; FIA GT3 European Championship

Daniel Keilwitz (born 3 August 1989) is a German racing driver. A veteran of the GT3 scene, Keilwitz's most notable accolades include the 2010 FIA GT3 European Championship and 2013 ADAC GT Masters, as well as being the lap record holder at the Nürburgring 24 Hours. He has also won the 2017 Blancpain GT Series Sprint Cup in the Pro-Am class.

Having followed a runner-up finish in the ADAC Procar series in 2006 up with three race-winning seasons in the Mini Challenge Germany, Keilwitz entered the ADAC GT Masters in 2009 with Leipert Motorsport. He went on to win the FIA GT3 European Championship in 2010 for Callaway Competition alongside Christian Hohenadel. Keilwitz and Callaway migrated to GT Masters from 2011 onward, finishing runner-up in 2012 before triumphing overall in 2013 with Diego Alessi. Keilwitz competed in the series until 2021, finishing third thrice and helping Jules Gounon to the 2017 title despite injury.

From 2022 to 2024, Keilwitz drove for Rinaldi Racing in the LMP3 class of the Michelin Le Mans Cup.

During his career, Keilwitz has taken part in the Nürburgring 24 Hours on a number of occasions. Aside from his record lap in 2023, Keilwitz finished second in the SP8 class in 2011 and won the 2023 contest in the SP9 Pro-Am category in a Ferrari 296 GT3 fielded by WTM by Rinaldi Racing.

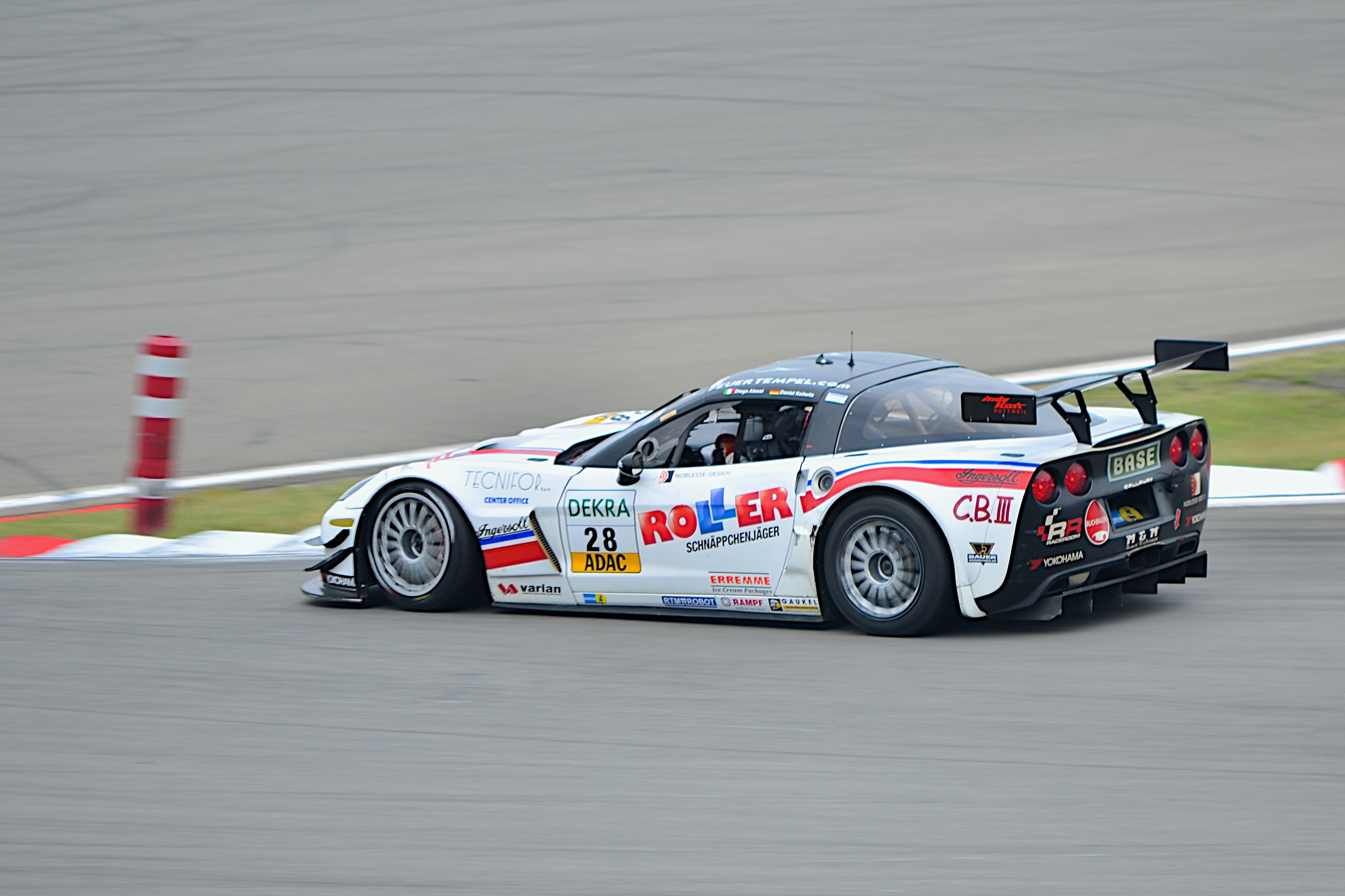
Keilwitz's Callaway Competition Corvette Z06.R GT3 in 2012.

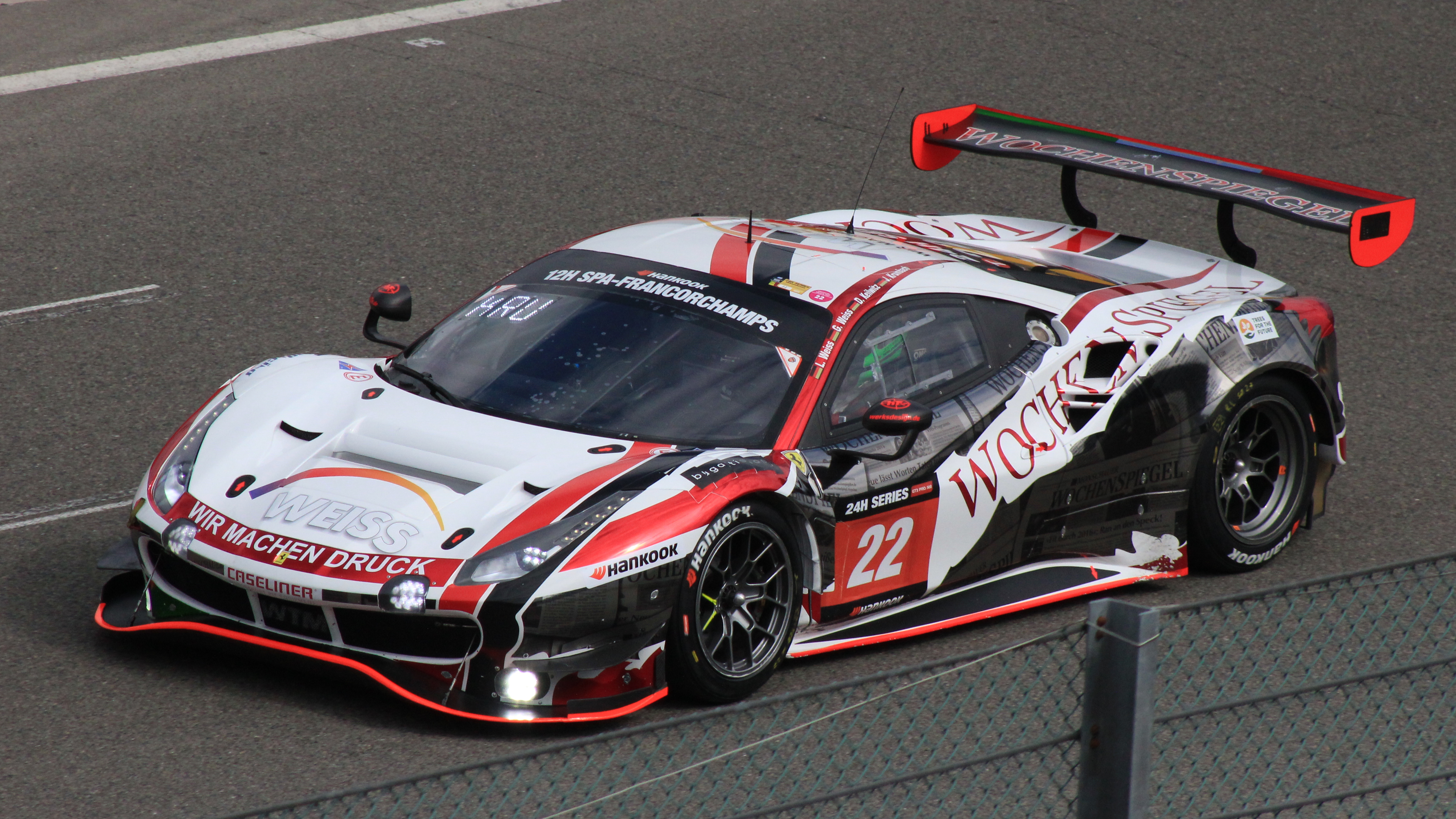
Keilwitz's WTM by Rinaldi Racing Ferrari 488 GT3 in 2022.

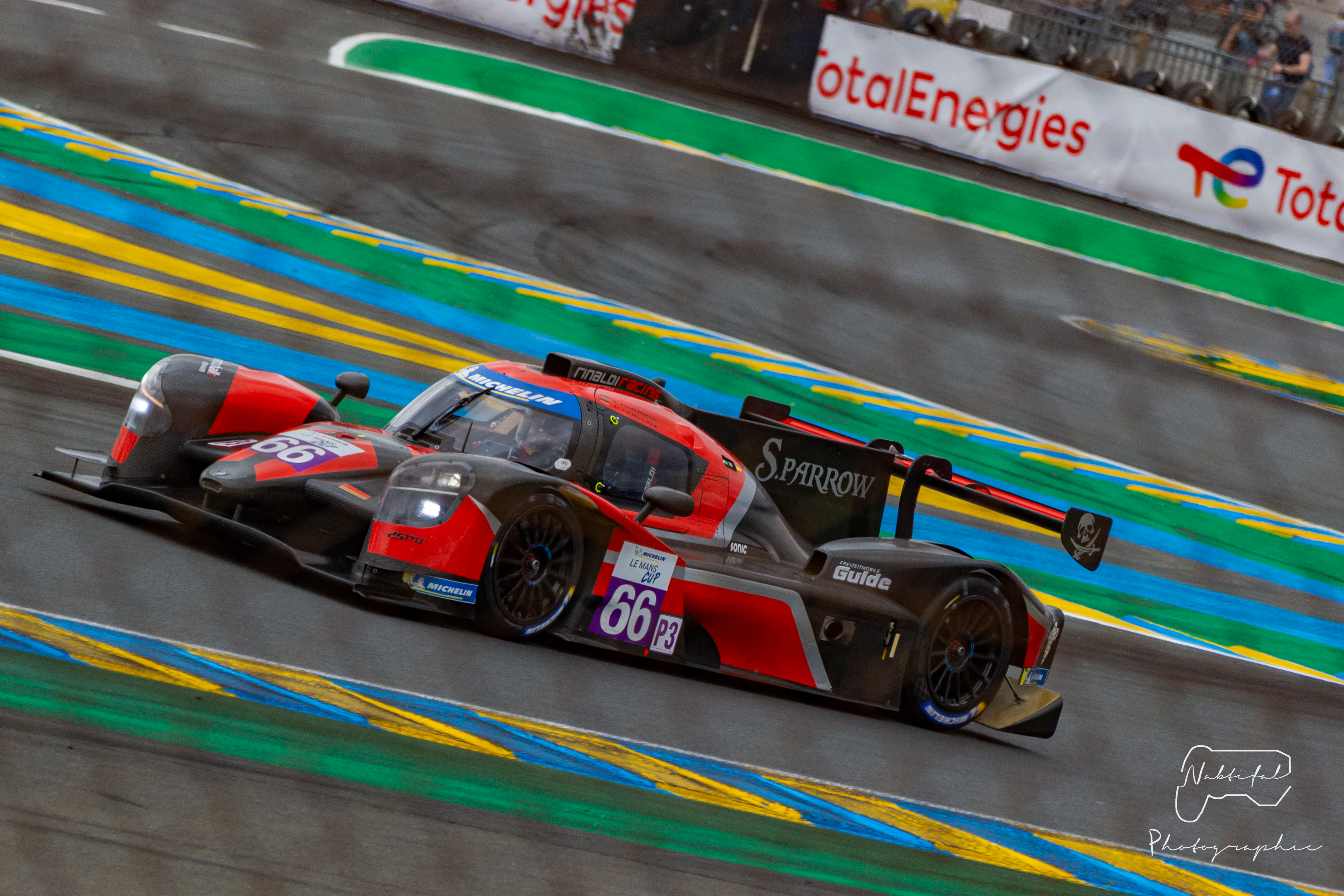
Keilwitz's Rinaldi Racing Duqueine D08 in 2022.

== Racing record ==
=== Career summary ===
Season	Series	Team	Races	Wins	Poles	F/Laps	Podiums	Points	Position
2005	German Production Car Championship - Diesel	N/A	4	0	0	0	0	15	10th
2006	ADAC Procar - Division III	N/A	13	4	3	?	8	80	**2nd**
2007	Mini Challenge Germany	Schubert Motorsport	13	1	0	2	1	127	11th
2008	Mini Challenge Germany	Schubert Motorsport	15	2	2	0	3	209	5th
2009	Mini Challenge Germany	ORMS Racing	15	2	1	1	5	242	5th
2009	ADAC GT Masters	Rhino's Leipert Motorsport 1	8	0	0	0	1	12	17th
2010	FIA GT3 European Championship	Callaway Competition	12	4	2	0	8	183	**1st**
2010	VLN Series	N/A	?	?	?	?	?	39.6	135th
2011	ADAC GT Masters	Callaway Competition	16	0	1	4	2	64	17th
2011	24 Hours of Nürburgring - SP8	Team Tobias Guttroff	1	0	0	0	1	N/A	**2nd**
2012	ADAC GT Masters	Callaway Competition	16	3	1	1	6	153	**2nd**
2012	24 Hours of Nürburgring - SP9	Haribo Racing Team	1	0	0	0	0	N/A	DNF
2013	ADAC GT Masters	Callaway Competition	16	5	0	2	5	179	**1st**
2013	24 Hours of Nürburgring - SP9	Black Falcon	1	0	0	0	0	N/A	15th
2013	FIA GT Series	Dörr Motorsport	2	0	0	0	0	1	21st
2013	FIA GT Series	Callaway Competition	0	0	0	0	0	1	21st
2014	ADAC GT Masters	Callaway Competition	16	6	3	1	7	184	**3rd**
2014	International GT Open - GT3 Pro-Am	V8 Racing	4	0	0	1	1	6	24th
2014	Porsche Supercup	Fach Auto Tech	1	0	0	0	0	0	NC†
2014	Blancpain GT Sprint Series	Callaway – RWT	2	0	0	0	0	0	NC
2015	ADAC GT Masters	Callaway Competition	16	0	0	1	4	104	7th
2015	24 Hours of Nürburgring - SP9	Walkenhorst Motorsport powered by Dunlop	1	0	0	0	0	N/A	6th
2015	Italian GT Championship - GT3	Solaris Motorsport	2	0	0	0	1	18	27th
2016	ADAC GT Masters	Callaway Competition	14	3	0	0	4	152	**3rd**
2016	VLN Langstrecken Serie - SP9	Mann Filter Team Zakspeed	1	0	0	0	0	0	NC†
2016	24 Hours of Nürburgring - SP9	Mann Filter Team Zakspeed	1	0	0	0	0	N/A	6th
2016	Blancpain GT Series Sprint Cup	Black Pearl Racing	2	0	0	0	0	0	NC
2016	Porsche Carrera Cup Germany - Class A	Wiesmann Motorsport	2	0	0	0	0	0	NC†
2017	ADAC GT Masters	Callaway Competition	8	2	0	0	5	123	**2nd**
2017	Blancpain GT Series Sprint Cup	Rinaldi Racing	10	0	0	0	0	0	NC
2017	Blancpain GT Series Sprint Cup - Pro-Am	Rinaldi Racing	10	7	1	3	8	144	**1st**
2017	Blancpain GT Series Endurance Cup	Rinaldi Racing	3	0	0	0	0	0	NC
2017	Blancpain GT Series Endurance Cup - Pro-Am	Rinaldi Racing	3	0	0	1	1	30	16th
2017	VLN Langstrecken Serie - SP9	Frikadelli Racing Team	1	0	0	0	0	0	NC†
2017	24 Hours of Nürburgring - SP9	Wochenspiegel Team Monschau	1	0	0	0	0	N/A	7th
2017	DMV Gran Turismo TCC - Class 1	N/A	2	0	0	0	0	0	NC†
2018	ADAC GT Masters	Callaway Competition	14	3	1	0	5	123	**3rd**
2018	Blancpain GT Series Endurance Cup	Rinaldi Racing	3	0	0	0	0	0	NC
2018	Blancpain GT Series Endurance Cup - Pro-Am	Rinaldi Racing	3	1	1	1	1	60	4th
2018	International GT Open - Pro-Am	Rinaldi Racing	4	0	0	0	1	6	16th
2018	24H GT Series - Continents' - A6	Lambda Performance	1	0	0	0	0	0	NC
2018	VLN Langstrecken Serie - SP9	Wochenspiegel Team Monschau	1	0	0	0	0	0	NC†
2018	Pirelli World Challenge	Callaway Competition USA	3	0	0	1	1	48	26th
2019	ADAC GT Masters	PROpeak Performance	8	0	0	0	0	66	17th
2019	ADAC GT Masters	Team Zakspeed BKK Mobil Oil Racing	4	0	0	0	1	66	17th
2019	VLN Langstrecken Serie - SP9	Team Zakspeed	1	0	0	0	0	0	NC†
2019	24 Hours of Nürburgring - SP9	Wochenspiegel Team Monschau	1	0	0	0	0	N/A	10th
2019	24H GT Series - Europe - A6	Wochenspiegel Team Monschau	2	0	0	0	0	12	24th
2019	NASCAR Whelen Euro Series - Elite 1	Mishumotors	1	0	0	0	0	58	35th
2020	ADAC GT Masters	Team Zakspeed BKK Mobil Oil Racing	8	0	0	0	0	17	31st
2020	GT World Challenge Europe Endurance Cup	Rinaldi Racing	5	0	0	0	0	0	NC
2020	GT World Challenge Europe Endurance Cup - Pro-Am	Rinaldi Racing	5	0	0	0	0	36	11th
2020	Intercontinental GT Challenge	Rinaldi Racing	1	0	0	0	0	0	NC
2020	Le Mans Cup - LMP3	Rinaldi Racing	2	0	0	0	0	2	30th
2021	ADAC GT Masters	Aust Motorsport	12	0	0	0	0	15	34th
2021	Nürburgring Langstrecken-Serie - SP9 Pro-Am	WTM Powered by Phoenix	2	0	0	0	0	0	NC†
2021	24 Hours of Nürburgring - SP9 Pro-Am	WTM Powered by Phoenix	1	0	0	0	1	N/A	**3rd**
2021	24H GT Series - GT3	WTM Powered by Phoenix	1	0	1	0	0	0	NC
2022	Le Mans Cup - LMP3	Rinaldi Racing	7	0	0	1	0	12	19th
2022	24H GT Series - GT3	WTM Racing	4	1	0	1	3	0	NC†
2022	Lamborghini Super Trofeo Europe - Pro	Lamborghini Stuttgart by Target	2	0	0	0	2	0	NC†
2023	Le Mans Cup - LMP3	Rinaldi Racing	7	0	0	0	0	14	15th
2023	Nürburgring Langstrecken-Serie - SP9	WTM by Rinaldi Racing	2	0	0	0	0	0	NC†
2023	24 Hours of Nürburgring - SP9 Pro-Am	WTM by Rinaldi Racing	1	1	0	1	1	N/A	**1st**
2024	Prototype Winter Series - LMP3	Rinaldi Racing	7	0	1	1	3	25.935	4th
2024	Le Mans Cup - LMP3	Rinaldi Racing	5	0	0	1	0	7	24th
2024	Nürburgring Langstrecken-Serie - SP9	Frikadelli Racing Team	1	0	0	0	0	*	*
2024	24 Hours of Nürburgring - SP9	Frikadelli Racing Team	1	0	0	0	0	N/A	12th

^{†} As Keilwitz was a guest driver, he was ineligible for championship points.
^{*} Season still in progress.

=== 24 Hours of Nürburgring results ===
Year	Team	Co-Drivers	Car	Class	Laps	Pos.	Class Pos.
2008	(Germany) MSC Rhön e.V. im AvD	(Switzerland) Benedikt Frei (Germany) Wolfgang Kudrass (Germany) Christian Leitheuser	BMW M3	V5	76	DNF	DNF
2010	(Germany) MSC Rhön e.V. im AvD	(Germany) Wolfgang Kudrass (Germany) Christian Leitheuser (Germany) Alexander Schula	BMW M3	SP5	16	DNF	DNF
2011	(private entrant)	(Germany) Yannick Fübrich (Germany) Tobias Guttroff (Germany) Joachim Kiesch	Chevrolet Corvette C6 GT4	SP8	140	23rd	**2nd**
2012	(Germany) Haribo Racing Team	(Denmark) Jan Magnussen (United States) Tommy Milner (United Kingdom) Richard Westbrook	Corvette Z06.R GT3	SP9	114	DNF	DNF
2013	(Germany) Black Falcon	(United Arab Emirates) Khaled Al Qubaisi (Germany) Christian Bracke (India) Vimal Mehta	Mercedes-Benz SLS AMG GT3	SP9	82	19th	15th
2015	(Germany) Walkenhorst Motorsport	(Italy) Michela Cerruti (United States) John Edwards (Germany) Felipe Fernández Laser	BMW Z4 GT3	SP9	153	6th	6th
2016	(Germany) Mann-Filter Team Zakspeed	(Germany) Sebastian Asch (Germany) Kenneth Heyer (Germany) Luca Ludwig	Mercedes-AMG GT3	SP9	131	6th	6th
2017	(Germany) Wochenspiegel Team Monschau	(Germany) Oliver Kainz (Germany) Jochen Krumbach (Germany) Georg Weiss	Ferrari 488 GT3	SP9	157	7th	7th
2019	(Germany) Wochenspiegel Team Monschau	(Germany) Oliver Kainz (Germany) Jochen Krumbach (Germany) Alexander Mattschull	Ferrari 488 GT3	SP9	153	10th	10th
2021	(Germany) WTM powered by Phoenix	(Netherlands) Indy Dontje (Germany) Jochen Krumbach (Germany) Georg Weiss	Ferrari 488 GT3	SP9	58	13th	13th
2023	(Germany) WTM by Rinaldi Racing	(Netherlands) Indy Dontje (Germany) Jochen Krumbach (Germany) Georg Weiss	Ferrari 296 GT3	SP9; Pro-Am	161	7th	**1st**
2024	(Germany) Frikadelli Racing	(Germany) Felipe Fernández Laser (Germany) Luca Ludwig (Argentina) Nicolás Varrone	Ferrari 296 GT3	SP9; Pro	50	12th	11th

=== Complete ADAC GT Masters results ===
(key) (Races in bold indicate pole position) (Races in italics indicate fastest lap)

Year	Team	Car	1	2	3	4	5	6	7	8	9	10	11	12	13	14	15	16	DC	Points
2009	Rhino's Leipert Motorsport 1	Ascari KZ1R GT3	OSC1; 1	OSC1; 2	ASS; 1	ASS; 2	HOC; 1	HOC; 2	LAU; 1; 6	LAU; 2; 3	NÜR; 1; 12	NÜR; 2; 10	SAC; 1; 6	SAC; 2 Ret	OSC2; 1 Ret	OSC2; 2; 19			17th	12
2011	Callaway Competition	Corvette Z06.R GT3	OSC; 1; 2	OSC; 2; 4	SAC; 1 Ret	SAC; 2 Ret	ZOL; 1 Ret	ZOL; 2 Ret	NÜR; 1 Ret	NÜR; 2; 6	RBR; 1 Ret	RBR; 2; 19	LAU; 1; 2	**LAU**; **2** Ret	ASS; 1; 21	ASS; 2 Ret	HOC; 1; 18	HOC; 2; 6	17th	64
2012	Callaway Competition	Corvette Z06.R GT3	OSC; 1 Ret	OSC; 2; 3	**ZAN**; **1**; 1	ZAN; 2; 6	**SAC**; **1**; 1	**SAC**; **2**; 4	NÜR1; 1; 33	NÜR1; 2 Ret	RBR; 1; 6	RBR; 2; 26	LAU; 1; 26	LAU; 2; 3	**NÜR2**; **1**; 2	NÜR2; 2; 1	HOC; 1 Ret	HOC; 2; 9	2nd	153
2013	Callaway Competition	Corvette Z06.R GT3	OSC; 1; 14	OSC; 2; 1	SPA; 1; 8	SPA; 2; 14	SAC; 1; 15	SAC; 2; 13	**NÜR**; **1**; 4	NÜR; 2; 5	**RBR**; **1**; 1	RBR; 2; 1	LAU; 1; 1	LAU; 2; 5	SVK; 1; 14	SVK; 2; 1	HOC; 1; 5	HOC; 2; 6	1st	179
2014	Callaway Competition	Corvette Z06.R GT3	OSC; 1 Ret	OSC; 2 Ret	ZAN; 1; 8	ZAN; 2; 9	**LAU**; **1**; 3	LAU; 2; 9	**RBR**; **1**; 1	**RBR**; **2**; 1	SLO; 1; 4	SLO; 2; 1	NÜR; 1 Ret	NÜR; 2; 1	SAC; 1 Ret	SAC; 2; 13	HOC; 1; 1	**HOC**; **2**; 1	3rd	184
2015	Callaway Competition	Corvette Z06.R GT3	OSC; 1; 4	OSC; 2; 14	RBR; 1; 2	RBR; 2; 12	SPA; 1; 12	SPA; 2; 2	LAU; 1; 9	LAU; 2; 2	NÜR; 1; 19	NÜR; 2 Ret	SAC; 1; 3	SAC; 2; 10	ZAN; 1; 7	ZAN; 2 Ret	HOC; 1; 5	HOC; 2; 9	7th	104
2016	Callaway Competition	Corvette C7 GT3-R	OSC; 1; 7	OSC; 2 Ret	SAC; 1; 4	SAC; 2; 1	LAU; 1; 4	LAU; 2; 1	RBR; 1; 3	**RBR**; **2**; 1	NÜR; 1; 5	NÜR; 2 Ret	ZAN; 1; 8	ZAN; 2; 5	HOC; 1; 6	HOC; 2 Ret			3rd	152
2017	Callaway Competition	Corvette C7 GT3-R	OSC; 1 Ret	OSC; 2; 2	LAU; 1; 5	LAU; 2; 4	**RBR**; **1**; 1	RBR; 2; 3	ZAN; 1	ZAN; 2	NÜR; 1	NÜR; 2	SAC; 1	SAC; 2	**HOC**; **1**; 1	HOC; 2; 2			2nd	123
2018	Callaway Competition	Corvette C7 GT3-R	OSC; 1; 19	OSC; 2; 18	MST; 1; 2	MST; 2; 2	**RBR**; **1**; 1	**RBR**; **2**; 1	NÜR; 1 Ret	NÜR; 2 Ret	ZAN; 1; 17	ZAN; 2; 13	SAC; 1 Ret	SAC; 2; 7	HOC; 1; 1	HOC; 2; 7			3rd	123
2019	PROpeak Performance	Aston Martin Vantage AMR GT3	OSC; 1 DSQ	OSC; 2 DSQ	MST; 1; 10	MST; 2; 19	RBR; 1; 23	RBR; 2; 9	ZAN; 1; 21	ZAN; 2; 29	NÜR; 1	NÜR; 2							17th	66
2019	Team Zakspeed BKK Mobil Oil Racing	Mercedes-AMG GT3											HOC; 1; 4	HOC; 2; 9	SAC; 1; 4	SAC; 2; 2			17th	66
2020	Team Zakspeed BKK Mobil Oil Racing	Mercedes-AMG GT3 Evo	LAU1; 1; 25	LAU1; 2; 9	NÜR; 1; 11	NÜR; 2; 32	HOC; 1; 16	HOC; 2; 14	SAC; 1; 14	SAC; 2 Ret	RBR; 1 WD	RBR; 2 WD	LAU2; 1	LAU2; 2	OSC; 1	OSC; 2			31st	160
2021	Aust Motorsport	Audi R8 LMS Evo	OSC; 1; 16	OSC; 2; 17	RBR; 1; 22	RBR; 2; 19	ZAN; 1 Ret	ZAN; 2; 17	LAU; 1; 12	LAU; 2; 10	SAC; 1 Ret	SAC; 2 DNS	HOC; 1; 16	HOC; 2; 11	NÜR; 1; 21	NÜR; 2; 17			34th	15

=== Complete Le Mans Cup results ===
(key) (Races in bold indicate pole position; results in italics indicate fastest lap)

Year	Entrant	Class	Chassis	1	2	3	4	5	6	7	Rank	Points
2020	Rinaldi Racing	LMP3	Duqueine M30 - D08	RIC; 10	SPA	LEC; 10	LMS; 1	LMS; 2	MNZ	POR	30th	2
2022	Rinaldi Racing	LMP3	Duqueine M30 - D08	LEC; 28	IMO; 4	LMS; 1; 12	LMS; 2; 29	MNZ; 18	SPA; 26	POR; 16	19th	12
2023	Rinaldi Racing	LMP3	Ligier JS P320	CAT; Ret	LMS; 1; 19	LMS; 2; 24	LEC; 10	ARA; 10	SPA; 4	POR; 15	15th	14
2024	Rinaldi Racing	LMP3	Ligier JS P320	CAT; 7	LEC; 21	LMS; 1; 11	LMS; 2; 12	SPA; Ret	MUG	POR	24th	7

Sporting positions
Preceded by Christopher Haase; Christopher Mies	FIA GT3 European Champion; 2010 with: Christian Hohenadel	Succeeded by Federico Leo; Francesco Castellacci
Preceded by Sebastian Asch; Maximilian Götz	ADAC GT Masters Champion; 2013 with: Diego Alessi	Succeeded by René Rast; Kelvin van der Linde
