= Diego Alessi =

Italian race car driver

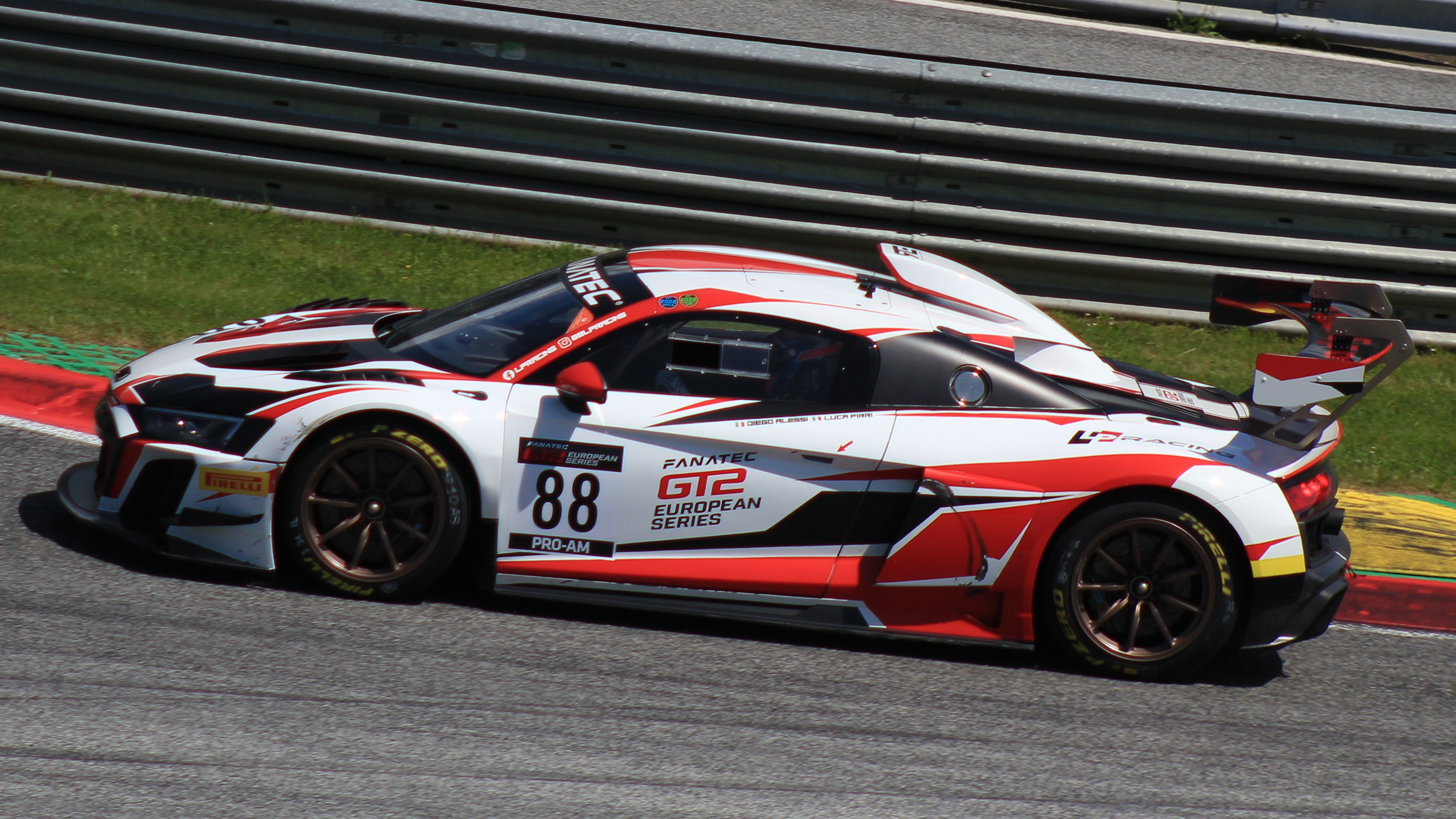
- Nationality: (Italy) Italian
- Born: 3 November 1971 (age 55) Rome, Italy
- Debut season: 1994
- Categorisation: FIA Silver (until 2013, 2015–2021); FIA Gold (2014); FIA Bronze (2022–)
- Wins: 35

Awards
- 1998: BMW Sport Pokal

Diego Alessi (born 3 November 1971 in Rome) is an Italian race car driver. He competed in the Italian Touring Car Championship from 1996–1999 and 2001–2002 - obtaining 12 poles and 12 wins - then moved to the Trofeo Maserati Europe - with 19 poles and three wins between 2003 and 2006 - as well as making three starts in FIA GT for Autorlando Porsche. From 2006 to 2010, he competed in FIA GT3 Championship at the wheel of Maserati Grand Sport, Aston Martin DBRS9, Corvette Z06 and Ferrari 430 Scuderia, obtaining one pole, two wins and the third final overall place on 2007 championship.

In 2008, Alessi participated in the Rolex Sports Car Series, driving a Pontiac GTO.R with young Californian Ryan Phinny, for Matt Connolly Motorsports P1 Groupe. Team drove in the 24 Hours of Daytona with Hal Prewitt, Karl Reindler, Vic Rice and Spencer Trenery. On this season, he earned three podium finishes (Mid-Ohio, Montreal and New Jersey).

From 2011 to 2015, Alessi contest the ADAC GT Masters Series on the Callaway Corvette Z06, gaining five poles, eight wins, one second final championship place (2012) and the overall championship 2013 win.

During his career, Alessi also drove some of majors world endurance races - four Spa-Francorchamps 24 hours, three Daytona 24 hours, two Interlagos Thousandmiles, two 24 Hours of Sicily and one Dubai 24 hours - getting four podium finish globally.

Sporting positions
| Preceded by Sebastian Asch; Maximilian Götz | ADAC GT Masters Champion; 2013 with: Daniel Keilwitz | Succeeded by René Rast; Kelvin van der Linde |
