= 2006 ADAC Procar Series =

Super 2000 motorcar races in Germany

Seasons
- ← 2005 2007 →

The 2006 ADAC Procar Series season was the twelfth season of the ADAC Procar Series, the German championship for Super 2000 cars. The season consisted of eight separate race weekends with two races each, spread over five different tracks. The championship was won by ex-BTCC driver Vincent Radermecker from Belgium.

== Teams and drivers ==
Team	Car	No.	Drivers	Rounds
(Germany) TFS Yaco Racing	Toyota Corolla T-Sport	1	(Switzerland) Mathias Schläppi	All
(Germany) TFS Yaco Racing	Toyota Corolla T-Sport	2	(Germany) Philip Geipel	All
(Germany) Schubert Motors	BMW 320i	3	(Germany) Marc Hennerici	1–2
(Germany) Schubert Motors	BMW 320i	4	(Germany) Claudia Hürtgen	1–2
(Germany) BMW Team Engstler	BMW 320i	5	(Russia) Rustem Teregulov	1–8, 13–16
(Germany) BMW Team Engstler	BMW 320i	14	(Germany) Franz Engstler	9–16
(Germany) TW Racing	Ford Focus ST	8	(Austria) Wolfgang Treml	13–16
(Switzerland) Maurer Motorsport	Chevrolet Lacetti	10	(Belgium) Vincent Radermecker	All
(Switzerland) Maurer Motorsport	Chevrolet Lacetti	11	(Germany) Rainer Bastuck	All
(Switzerland) Rikli Motorsport	Honda Accord	12	(Switzerland) Peter Rikli	All
(Germany) Kissling Motorsport	Opel Astra GTC	15	(Germany) Stefan Kissling	7
(Germany) Vogel Motorsport	Opel Astra OPC	16	(Germany) Sandro Vogel	15–16
(Germany) Fleper Motorsport	Honda Civic Type-R	20	(Germany) Norbert Bermes	3–8, 13–16
(Germany) Frensch Power Motorsport	Peugeot 206 GTI	22	(Germany) Karsten Frensch	5–8, 13–16
(Germany) Frensch Power Motorsport	Peugeot 206 GTI	23	(Germany) Colin Roloff	5–10, 13–16

== Race calendar and results ==
Round	Circuit	Date	Winning driver	Winning team
1 2	(Germany) Oschersleben	23 April	Vincent Radermecker; Mathias Schläppi	Maurer Motorsport; TFS Yaco Racing
3 4	(Germany) EuroSpeedway	14 May	Vincent Radermecker; Vincent Radermecker	Maurer Motorsport; Maurer Motorsport
5 6	(Germany) Nürburgring	28 May	Vincent Radermecker; Vincent Radermecker	Maurer Motorsport; Maurer Motorsport
7 8	(Germany) Oschersleben	4 June	Philip Geipel; Philip Geipel	TFS Yaco Racing; TFS Yaco Racing
9 10	(Germany) Nürburgring (24 Hours)	17 June	Franz Engstler	BMW Team Engstler
11 12	(Netherlands) Circuit Assen	16 July	Franz Engstler; Franz Engstler	BMW Team Engstler; BMW Team Engstler
13 14	(Austria) Salzburgring	17 September	Vincent Radermecker; Vincent Radermecker	Maurer Motorsport; Maurer Motorsport
15 16	(Germany) Oschersleben	1 October	Vincent Radermecker; Franz Engstler	Maurer Motorsport; BMW Team Engstler

== Championship standings ==
Driver's championship
Position	Driver	Points
1	Vincent Radermecker	120
2	Mathias Schläppi	90
3	Rainer Bastuck	73
4	Philip Geipel	67
5	Rustem Teregulov	54
6	Peter Rikli	49
7	Franz Engstler	48
8	Norbert Bermes	20
9	Wolfgang Treml	10
10	Colin Roloff	7
11	Karsten Frensch	6
12	Sandro Vogel	2

Team's Championship
Position	Team	Points
1	Maurer Motorsport	193
2	TFS Yaco Racing	157
3	BMW Team Engstler	102
4	Rikli Motorsport	49
5	Fleper Motorsport	20
6	Frensch Power Motorsport	13
7	TW Racing	10
8	Vogel Motorsport	2
