= 2007 ADAC Procar Series =

Super 2000 motorcar races in German

Seasons
- ← 2006 2008 →

The 2007 ADAC Procar Series season was the thirteenth season of the ADAC Procar Series, the German championship for Super 2000 cars. The season consisted of eight separate race weekends with two races each (except for the first round at Nürburgring which was one double-distance race), spread over five different tracks. The championship was won by touring car veteran Franz Engstler for the second time.

== Teams and drivers ==
| Team | Car | No. | Drivers | Rounds |
|---|---|---|---|---|
| (Switzerland) Maurer Motorsport | Chevrolet Lacetti | 2 | (Spain) María de Villota | All |
| (Germany) TFS Yaco Racing | Toyota Corolla | 3 | (Germany) Philip Geipel | 1–2, 4–15 |
| (Germany) TFS Yaco Racing | Toyota Corolla | 4 | (Germany) Sebastian Stahl | 3, 10–11 |
| (Germany) Engstler Motorsport Team 1 | BMW 320i | 5 | (Germany) Franz Engstler | All |
| (Germany) Engstler Motorsport Team 1 | BMW 320i | 6 | (Russia) Andrei Romanov | All |
| (Germany) Engstler Motorsport Team 2 | BMW 320i | 7 | (Russia) Rustem Teregulov | 8–11, 14–15 |
| (Germany) Engstler Motorsport Team 2 | BMW 320i | 8 | (Russia) Oleg Petrishin | 1–7, 10–15 |
| (Germany) Kissling Motorsport | Opel Astra GTC | 10 | (Germany) Nicole Müllenmeister | 4–5 |
| (Germany) Kissling Motorsport | Opel Astra GTC | 11 | (Germany) Rainer Bastuck | All |
| (Switzerland) Rikli Motorsport | Honda Accord | 12 | (Switzerland) Peter Rikli | All |
| (Switzerland) Rikli Motorsport | Honda Civic Type-R | 22 | (Switzerland) Stephan Zbinden | 10–11 |
| (Germany) GENA Motorsport | Ford Focus ST | 14 | (Luxembourg) Gilles Bruckner | 3 |
| (Germany) TW Racing | Ford Focus ST | 15 | (Austria) Wolfgang Treml | 8–9, 14–15 |
| (Germany) Vogel Motorsport | Opel Astra OPC | 16 | (Germany) Sandro Vogel | 4–5, 14–15 |
| (Russia) Avtodom Racing-BMW Russland | BMW 320i | 17 | (Russia) Vladimir Labazov | 1–2, 4–15 |
| (Russia) Avtodom Racing-BMW Russland | BMW 320i | 18 | (Russia) Illya Burenko | 3 |
| (Germany) ALL-INK.COM Racing | Ford Focus ST | 20 | (Germany) René Münnich | 8–9 |
| (Czech Republic) CSMS Racing | Alfa Romeo 156 | 21 | (Czech Republic) Michal Matějovský | 12–15 |

== Race calendar and results ==
| Round | Circuit | Date | Winning driver | Winning team |
|---|---|---|---|---|
| 1 2 | (Germany) Oschersleben | 13 May | Franz Engstler; Franz Engstler | Engstler Motorsport; Engstler Motorsport |
| 3 | (Germany) Nürburgring | 9 June | Franz Engstler | Engstler Motorsport |
| 4 5 | (Germany) Oschersleben | 8 July | Franz Engstler; Vladimir Labazov | Engstler Motorsport; Avtodom Racing-BMW Russland |
| 6 7 | (Netherlands) TT Circuit Assen | 22 July | Franz Engstler; Franz Engstler | Engstler Motorsport; Engstler Motorsport |
| 8 9 | (Germany) EuroSpeedway | 5 August | Franz Engstler; Franz Engstler | Engstler Motorsport; Engstler Motorsport |
| 10 11 | (Germany) Nürburgring | 26 August | Franz Engstler; María de Villota | Engstler Motorsport; Maurer Motorsport |
| 12 13 | (Germany) Sachsenring | 16 September | Franz Engstler; Franz Engstler | Engstler Motorsport; Engstler Motorsport |
| 14 15 | (Germany) Oschersleben | 30 September | Franz Engstler; Vladimir Labazov | Engstler Motorsport; Avtodom Racing-BMW Russland |

== Championship standings ==
Driver's championship
| Position | Driver | Points |
|---|---|---|
| 1 | Franz Engstler | 134 |
| 2 | Andrei Romanov | 74 |
| 3 | María de Villota | 72 |
| 4 | Vladimir Labazov | 70 |
| 5 | Philip Geipel | 59 |
| 6 | Rainer Bastuck | 53 |
| 7 | Peter Rikli | 49 |
| 8 | Oleg Petrishin | 24 |
| 9 | Sebastian Stahl | 19 |
| 10 | Rustem Teregulov | 15 |
| 11 | Illya Burenko | 5 |
| 12 | Gilles Bruckner | 4 |
| 13 | Nicole Müllenmeister | 3 |

Team's Championship
| Position | Team | Points |
|---|---|---|
| 1 | Engstler Motorsport Team 1 | 208 |
| 2 | Avtodom Racing-BMW Russland | 74 |
| 3 | Maurer Motorsport | 72 |
| 4 | TFS Yaco Racing | 69 |
| 5 | Kissling Motorsport | 56 |
| 6 | Rikli Motorsport | 49 |
| 7 | Engstler Motorsport Team 2 | 39 |
| 8 | GENA Motorsport | 4 |
