= 2005 ADAC Procar Series =

Super 2000 motorcar races in German

Seasons
- ← 2004 2006 →

The 2005 ADAC Procar Series season was the eleventh season of the ADAC Procar Series, the German championship for Super 2000 cars. The season consisted of eight separate race weekends with two races each, spread over six different tracks. The championship was won by Mathias Schläppi in a very dominant way, winning 12 out of 16 races.

== Teams and drivers ==
Team	Car	No.	Drivers	Rounds
(Germany) Schubert Motors	BMW 320i	2	(Germany) Reinhard Huber	1–4
(Germany) Schubert Motors	BMW 320i	3	(Russia) Rustem Teregulov	11–16
(Germany) TW Racing Team 2	Ford Focus ST	6	(Austria) Hermann Speck	13–14
(Germany) RS Line Stiefel	Ford Focus ST	7	(Austria) Sascha Plöderl	5–6, 9–16
(Germany) TW Racing Team 1	Ford Focus ST	8	(Austria) Wolfgang Treml	All
(Germany) TW Racing Team 1	Ford Focus ST	9	(Austria) Karl-Heinz Matzinger	1–10
(Switzerland) Maurer Motorsport	MG ZS	10	(Switzerland) Mathias Schläppi	All
(Switzerland) Maurer Motorsport	MG ZS	11	(Germany) Rainer Bastuck	1–6, 9–16
(Germany) BMW Team Engstler	BMW 320i	14	(Germany) Franz Engstler *	15–16
(Germany) BMW Team Engstler	BMW 320i	15	(Malaysia) Fariqe Hairuman *	15–16
(Germany) Vogel Motorsport	Opel Astra	16	(Germany) Sandro Vogel	5–8, 11–16

* Guest driver, no points awarded.

== Championship standings ==
Driver's championship
Position	Driver	Points
1	Mathias Schläppi	132
2	Wolfgang Treml	77
3	Sascha Plöderl	67
4	Rainer Bastuck	67
5	Karl-Heinz Matzinger	38
6	Rustem Teregulov	36
7	Sandro Vogel	25
8	Reinhard Huber	19
9	Hermann Speck	2

Team's Championship
Position	Team	Points
1	Maurer Motorsport	199
2	TW Racing Team 1	115
3	RS Line Stiefel	67
4	Schubert Motors	55
5	Vogel Motorsport	25
6	TW Racing Team 2	2
