= 2012 ADAC Procar Series =

Motor racing competition in Germany

Seasons
- ← 2011 2013 →

The 2012 ADAC Procar Series season was the eighteenth season of the ADAC Procar Series, the German championship for Super 2000 touring cars. The season consisted of eight separate race weekends with two races each, spread over seven different tracks.

== Teams and drivers ==
Team	Car	No.	Drivers	Rounds
Division 1
(Germany) Thate Motorsport	BMW 320si E90	1	(Germany) Johannes Leidinger	7–8
(Germany) Thate Motorsport	BMW 320si E90	2	(Germany) Jens Guido Weimann	All
(Germany) Liqui Moly Team Engstler	BMW 320si E90	4	(Germany) Paul Green	All
(Germany) KM Racing	BMW 320si E90	6	(Germany) Michael Meyer	3–4
(Germany) K&K Motorsport	Audi A4 Super 2000	7	(Germany) Andreas Kast	1–3
(Switzerland) Vukovic Motorsport	BMW 320si E90	8	(Switzerland) Milenko Vukovic	2–4, 7
(Switzerland) Huggler Motorsport	BMW 320i E46	9	(Switzerland) Markus Huggler	6–8
(Switzerland) Rikli Motorsport	Honda Civic FD	12	(Switzerland) Peter Rikli	7–8
Division 2
(Germany) Mierschke Motorsport	Ford Fiesta ST	31	(Germany) Nils Mierschke	All
(Germany) Liqui Moly Team Engstler	Ford Fiesta 1.6 16V	33	(Germany) Julia Trampert	All
(Germany) Liqui Moly Team Engstler	Ford Fiesta 1.6 16V	34	(Germany) Lennart Marioneck	All
(Switzerland) Maurer Motorsport	Ford Fiesta 1.6 16V	35	(Argentina) Wilson Borgnino	2
(Switzerland) Maurer Motorsport	Chevrolet Aveo	35	(Argentina) Wilson Borgnino	3–8
(Switzerland) Maurer Motorsport	Chevrolet Aveo	36	(Russia) Vadim Meshcheriakov	2–3
(Switzerland) Maurer Motorsport	Chevrolet Aveo	37	(Russia) Alexander Frolov	2–3
(Switzerland) Maurer Motorsport	Chevrolet Aveo	53	(Germany) Bodo Cordes	4
(Germany) ETH Tuning	Peugeot 207 Sport	38	(Germany) Guido Thierfelder	All
(Germany) ETH Tuning	Peugeot 207 Sport	39	(Germany) Norbert Heinz	7–8
(Germany) ETH Tuning	Citroën Saxo VTS	58	(Germany) Andreas Rinke	7–8
(Germany) Ravenol Team	Ford Fiesta 1.6 16V	40	(Belarus) Yury Krauchuk	1–6
(Germany) Ravenol Team	Ford Fiesta 1.6 16V	57	(Germany) René Freisberg	8
(Germany) Glatzel Racing	Ford Fiesta ST	41	(Germany) Ingo Wirtz	3, 5
(Germany) Glatzel Racing	Ford Fiesta ST	43	(Austria) David Griessner	5–7
(Germany) Glatzel Racing	Ford Fiesta ST	56	(Austria) Michael Zeilinger	8
(Germany) Glatzel Racing	Ford Fiesta VCT Sport	42	(Germany) Ralf Glatzel	All
(Croatia) Gena Autosport	Ford Fiesta 1.6 16V	45	(Germany) Erwin Lukas	7
(Croatia) Gena Autosport	Ford Fiesta TI-VCT	46	(Germany) Kevin Krammes	1–2, 8
(Germany) NK Racing	Ford Fiesta ST	47	(Germany) Ronny Reinsberger	3
(Germany) NK Racing	Ford Fiesta ST	48	(Germany) René Keyselt	3
(Germany) Lafia Motorsport	Citroën C2 VTS	49	(Germany) Felix Janning	1–3
(Germany) Lafia Motorsport	Citroën C2 VTS	52	(Germany) Alf Ahrens	4
(Germany) RSK-Motorsport	Ford Fiesta ST	51	(Germany) Patrick Rahn	4

== Race calendar and results ==
Round		Circuit	Date	Pole position	Fastest lap	Winning driver	Winning team
1	R1	(Germany) Motorsport Arena Oschersleben	1 April	(Germany) Jens Guido Weimann	(Germany) Jens Guido Weimann	(Germany) Jens Guido Weimann	(Germany) Thate Motorsport
1	R2	(Germany) Motorsport Arena Oschersleben	1 April		(Germany) Jens Guido Weimann	(Germany) Jens Guido Weimann	(Germany) Thate Motorsport
2	R1	(Netherlands) Circuit Park Zandvoort	6 May	(Germany) Jens Guido Weimann	(Germany) Jens Guido Weimann	(Germany) Jens Guido Weimann	(Germany) Thate Motorsport
2	R2	(Netherlands) Circuit Park Zandvoort	6 May		(Germany) Jens Guido Weimann	(Germany) Jens Guido Weimann	(Germany) Thate Motorsport
3	R1	(Germany) Sachsenring	10 June	(Germany) Jens Guido Weimann	(Switzerland) Milenko Vukovic	(Germany) Jens Guido Weimann	(Germany) Thate Motorsport
3	R2	(Germany) Sachsenring	10 June		(Germany) Jens Guido Weimann	(Germany) Jens Guido Weimann	(Germany) Thate Motorsport
4	R1	(Germany) Motorsport Arena Oschersleben	8 July	(Germany) Jens Guido Weimann	(Germany) Jens Guido Weimann	(Germany) Jens Guido Weimann	(Germany) Thate Motorsport
4	R2	(Germany) Motorsport Arena Oschersleben	8 July		(Germany) Jens Guido Weimann	(Germany) Jens Guido Weimann	(Germany) Thate Motorsport
5	R1	(Austria) Red Bull Ring	12 August	(Germany) Jens Guido Weimann	(Germany) Jens Guido Weimann	(Germany) Jens Guido Weimann	(Germany) Thate Motorsport
5	R2	(Austria) Red Bull Ring	12 August		(Germany) Jens Guido Weimann	(Germany) Jens Guido Weimann	(Germany) Thate Motorsport
6	R1	(Germany) Lausitzring	26 August	(Germany) Jens Guido Weimann	(Germany) Jens Guido Weimann	(Germany) Jens Guido Weimann	(Germany) Thate Motorsport
6	R2	(Germany) Lausitzring	26 August		(Germany) Jens Guido Weimann	(Germany) Jens Guido Weimann	(Germany) Thate Motorsport
7	R1	(Germany) Nürburgring	16 September	(Germany) Jens Guido Weimann	(Germany) Johannes Leidinger	(Switzerland) Peter Rikli	(Switzerland) Rikli Motorsport
7	R2	(Germany) Nürburgring	16 September		(Germany) Johannes Leidinger	(Germany) Johannes Leidinger	(Germany) Thate Motorsport
8	R1	(Germany) Hockenheimring	30 September	(Germany) Jens Guido Weimann	(Germany) Johannes Leidinger	(Germany) Jens Guido Weimann	(Germany) Thate Motorsport
8	R2	(Germany) Hockenheimring	30 September		(Germany) Johannes Leidinger	(Germany) Jens Guido Weimann	(Germany) Thate Motorsport

== Championship standings ==
=== Drivers' Championship ===
Pos	Driver	OSC (Germany)		ZAN (Netherlands)		SAC (Germany)		OSC (Germany)		RBR (Austria)		LAU (Germany)		NÜR (Germany)		HOC (Germany)		Points
Division 1
1	(Germany) Jens Guido Weimann	**1**	1	**1**	1	**1**	1	**1**	1	**1**	1	**1**	1	**3**	DNS	**1**	1	146
2	(Germany) Paul Green	3	Ret	2	2	3	2	11	3	2	2	2	2	5	2	Ret	DNS	91
3	(Germany) Johannes Leidinger													2	1	2	2	34
4	(Switzerland) Markus Huggler											3	3	4	4	4	3	33
5	(Switzerland) Peter Rikli													1	3	3	4	27
6	(Switzerland) Milenko Vukovic			Ret	Ret	2	DNS	2	2					DNS	DNS			24
7	(Germany) Michael Meyer					4	3	3	4									22
8	(Germany) Andreas Kast	2	DNS	DNS	DNS	DNS	DNS											8
Division 2
1	(Germany) Guido Thierfelder	**4**	2	3	3	5	4	6	5	3	3	7	7	6	5	5	12	137
2	(Germany) Lennart Marioneck	9	Ret	**4**	4	10	8	4	6	6	Ret	4	4	Ret	9	9	5	87
3	(Germany) Ralf Glatzel	6	4	7	5	6	6	8	8	5	5	5	10	7	7	7	Ret	87
4	(Germany) Nils Mierschke	5	3	5	6	**8**	5	7	7	**4**	4	**Ret**	5	9	8	**12**	Ret	86
5	(Belarus) Yury Krauchuk	8	6	6	Ret	7	7	**5**	9	9	DNS	9	8					45
6	(Germany) Julia Trampert	11	7	8	8	11	9	9	11	8	7	10	9	10	12	14	10	40
7	(Argentina) Wilson Borgnino			9	7	Ret	Ret	DNS	Ret	Ret	DNS	8	Ret	8	6	10	7	33
8	(Austria) David Griessner									7	6	6	6	Ret	11			24
9	(Germany) Andreas Rinke													13	10	6	6	20
10	(Germany) Kevin Krammes	7	5	DNS	DNS											8	8	20
11	(Germany) René Freisberg															11	9	6
12	(Germany) Patrick Rahn							10	10									5
13	(Germany) Ronny Reinsberger					9	Ret											4
14	(Germany) Felix Janning	10	8	DNS	DNS	DNS	DNS											4
15	(Germany) Ingo Wirtz					DNS	DNS			10	9							4
16	(Germany) Norbert Heinz													11	13	13	13	3
17	(Germany) René Keyselt					12	10											3
18	(Germany) Erwin Lukas													12	14			2
19	(Austria) Michael Zeilinger															15	11	2
20	(Germany) Alf Ahrens							12	DNS									1
	(Germany) Bodo Cordes							Ret	DNS									0
	(Russia) Alexander Frolov			Ret	DNS	DNS	DNS											0
	(Russia) Vadim Meshcheriakov			DNS	DNS	DNS	DNS											0
Pos	Driver	OSC (Germany)		ZAN (Netherlands)		SAC (Germany)		OSC (Germany)		RBR (Austria)		LAU (Germany)		NÜR (Germany)		HOC (Germany)		Points

Colour	Result
Gold	Winner
Silver	Second place
Bronze	Third place
Green	Points classification
Blue	Non-points classification
Blue	Non-classified finish (NC)
Purple	Retired, not classified (Ret)
Red	Did not qualify (DNQ)
Red	Did not pre-qualify (DNPQ)
Black	Disqualified (DSQ)
White	Did not start (DNS)
White	Withdrew (WD)
White	Race cancelled (C)
Blank	Did not practice (DNP)
Blank	Did not arrive (DNA)
Blank	Excluded (EX)

**Bold** – Pole
Italics – Fastest lap

=== Teams' Championship ===
Pos	Team	OSC (Germany)		ZAN (Netherlands)		SAC (Germany)		OSC (Germany)		RBR (Austria)		LAU (Germany)		NÜR (Germany)		HOC (Germany)		Points
Division 1
1	(Germany) Thate Motorsport	1	1	1	1	1	1	1	1	1	1	1	1	2	1	1	1	158
2	(Germany) Liqui Moly Team Engstler	3	Ret	2	2	3	2	11	3	2	2	2	2	5	2	Ret	DNS	91
3	(Switzerland) Huggler Motorsport											3	3	4	4	4	3	33
4	(Switzerland) Rikli Motorsport													1	3	3	4	27
5	(Switzerland) Vukovic Motorsport			Ret	Ret	2	DNS	2	2					DNS	DNS			24
6	(Germany) KM Racing					4	3	3	4									22
7	(Germany) K&K Motorsport	2	DNS	DNS	DNS	DNS	DNS											8
Division 2
1	(Germany) ETH Tuning 1	4	2	3	3	5	4	6	5	3	3	7	7	6	5	5	6	144
2	(Germany) Liqui Moly Team Engstler	9	7	4	4	10	8	4	6	6	7	4	4	10	9	9	5	98
3	(Germany) Glatzel Racing 1	6	4	7	5	6	6	8	8	5	5	5	6	7	7	7	Ret	91
4	(Germany) Mierschke Motorsport	5	3	5	6	8	5	7	7	4	4	Ret	5	9	8	12	Ret	86
5	(Germany) Ravenol Team	8	6	6	Ret	7	7	5	9	9	DNS	9	8			11	9	51
6	(Switzerland) Maurer Motorsport 2			9	7	Ret	Ret	Ret	Ret	Ret	DNS	8	Ret	8	6	10	7	33
7	(Croatia) Gena Autosport	7	5	DNS	DNS									12	14	8	8	22
8	(Germany) Glatzel Racing 2					DNS	DNS			10	9					15	11	6
9	(Germany) NK Racing Team					9	10											6
10	(Germany) RSK-Motorsport							10	10									5
11	(Germany) Lafia Motorsport	10	8	DNS	DNS	DNS	DNS	12	DNS									5
12	(Germany) ETH Tuning 2													11	13	13	13	3
	(Switzerland) Maurer Motorsport 1			Ret	DNS	DNS	DNS											0
Pos	Team	OSC (Germany)		ZAN (Netherlands)		SAC (Germany)		OSC (Germany)		RBR (Austria)		LAU (Germany)		NÜR (Germany)		HOC (Germany)		Points

Colour	Result
Gold	Winner
Silver	Second place
Bronze	Third place
Green	Points classification
Blue	Non-points classification
Blue	Non-classified finish (NC)
Purple	Retired, not classified (Ret)
Red	Did not qualify (DNQ)
Red	Did not pre-qualify (DNPQ)
Black	Disqualified (DSQ)
White	Did not start (DNS)
White	Withdrew (WD)
White	Race cancelled (C)
Blank	Did not practice (DNP)
Blank	Did not arrive (DNA)
Blank	Excluded (EX)

**Bold** – Pole
Italics – Fastest lap

Position	1st	2nd	3rd	4th	5th	6th	7th	8th
Points	10	8	6	5	4	3	2	1
