= Edward Sandström =

Swedish racing driver (born 1979)

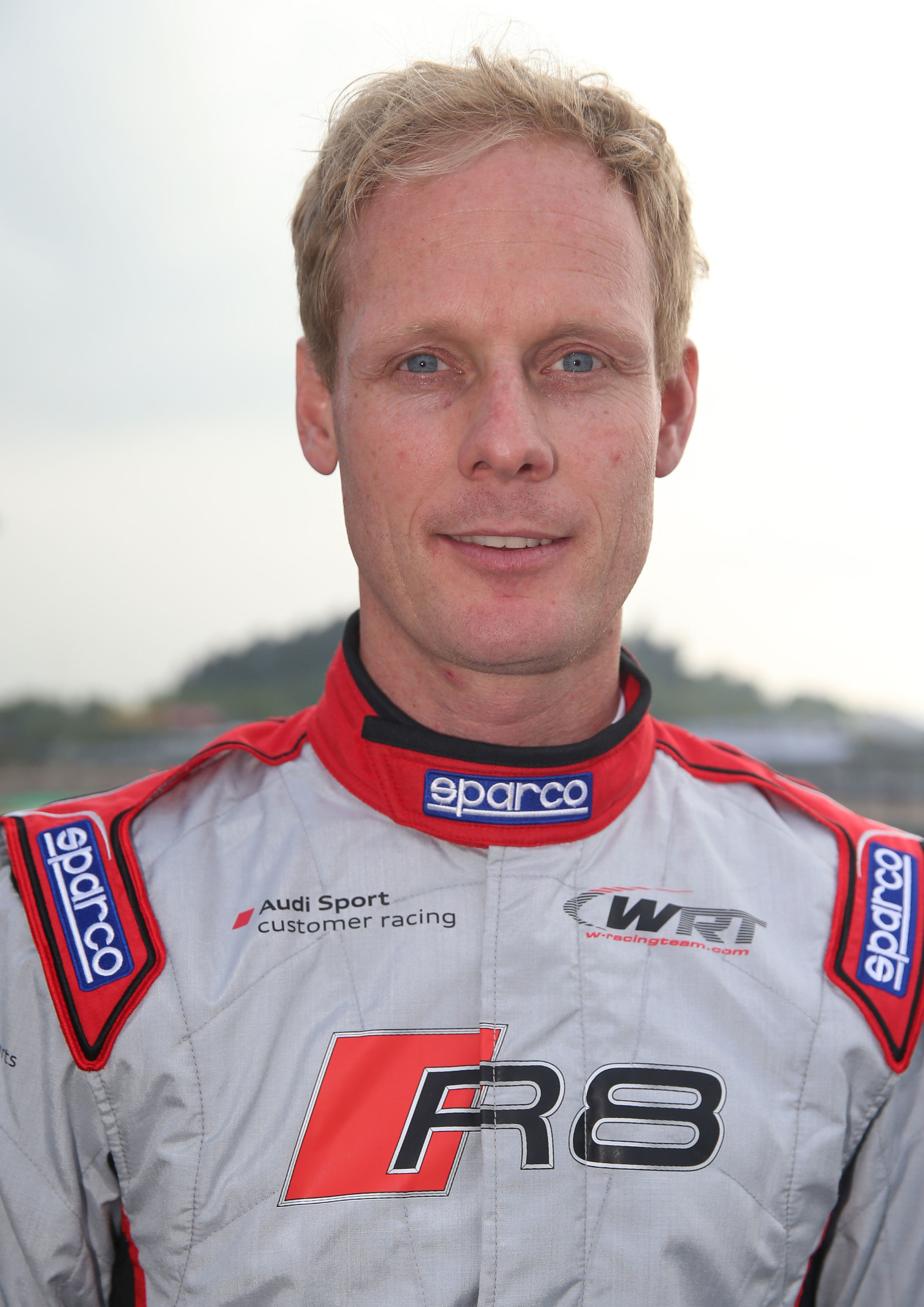
- Sandström in May 2016
- Nationality: (Sweden) Swedish
- Born: Edward Göran Carl Christian Sandström; 4 January 1979 (age 47) Örebro, Sweden
- Categorisation: FIA Silver (until 2013); FIA Gold (2014–)

Championship titles
- 2000 2007 2015: Volvo S40 Junior Touring Car Cup; Porsche Carrera Cup Scandinavia; Nürburgring 24 Hours

Edward Göran Carl Christian Sandström (born 4 January 1979) is a Swedish racing driver. He has competed in a variety of disciplines including rallycross, sports cars and touring cars.

== Career ==
=== Early career ===
Sandström raced karts in the early 1990s. In 1999 and 2000, he competed in the Volvo S40 Junior Touring Car Cup and won the championship title in his second year. He then competed in formula racing series from 2001 to 2004. In 2001, he drove in the Zetec class of Swedish Formula Ford and was runner-up. In 2003 and 2004, he competed in the Formula Renault V6 Eurocup and in the first year achieved his best overall placement in the series with 17th place. In 2002, 2005 and 2006, he drove in the Swedish Touring Car Championship and finished in fourth place overall in 2002 and 2005.

=== GT Motorsport ===
From 2006 to 2010, Sandström competed in Porsche Carrera Cup Scandinavia. In 2007 he won the championship title and achieved his greatest success in this brand championship.

In 2010 and 2011, Sandström drove for the Schubert Motorsport team with a BMW Z4 GT3 in the FIA GT3 European Championship. There, he finished sixth overall in 2010 together with Patrick Söderlund.

In 2010, 2012, 2015 and 2016, Sandström competed in the ADAC GT Masters. In the first year he was a guest starter with the Need for Speed by Schubert Motorsport team. In 2012, he competed for Prosperia uhc speed and in 2015 for the kfzteile24 MS Racing team with an Audi R8 LMS ultra, where in the latter, he finished eighth overall and achieved his best result in the racing series. In the 2016 season, he drove an Audi R8 LMS GT3 for kfzteile24 APR Motorsport.

From 2011 to 2015, Sandström competed with various racing teams in the GT3 Pro Cup classification of the Blancpain Endurance Series. He achieved his greatest success in the series, a third place in the overall standings, in 2014 for the French team Saintéloc Racing with an Audi R8 LMS ultra. He then drove in the Blancpain GT Series Sprint Cup in 2016 and the Blancpain GT Series Endurance Cup in 2017.

In 2013, Sandström drove with the Belgian Audi Club Team WRT together with Frank Stippler for one season in the Pro classification of the FIA GT Series and won the runner-up title. In parallel to the Blancpain racing series, he started in some races of other racing series, such as 2011 in the American Le Mans Series, 2012 and 2015 in the Swedish GT Series, 2014 and 2015 in the French GT Championship and 2017 in the Intercontinental GT Challenge. In 2018, he drove a Chevrolet Camaro in two V8 Thunder Cars Sweden races and finished 13th overall.

=== Endurance racing ===
Sandström took part in 24-hour endurance races several times in his motorsport career. From 2010 to 2018, he competed in the Nürburgring 24 Hours. There, he achieved second place in the SP9 GT3 classification for Schubert Motorsport in 2010 in a BMW Z4 GT3. In 2015, the result improved and won the SP9 class victory in an Audi R8 LMS for Audi Sport Team WRT.

Sandström competed in some races in the 24H Series in 2011 and 2012. At the Dubai 24 Hours in 2011, he won the race together with Augusto Farfus, Claudia Hürtgen and Tommy Milner in a BMW Z4 GT3 for the Schubert Motorsport team. In the same year, he also achieved victory for Schubert Motorsport with Michael Outzen, Lars Stugemo and Peter Posavac. In 2012, he competed for the W Racing Team in an Audi R8 LMS at the 24 Hours of Zolder and became the overall winner.

=== Rallycross ===
In the 2015 season, Sandström competed for the EKS RX team in a race in the FIA World Rallycross Championship (WRX) and finished 28th in the overall standings.
