= 2015 ADAC Procar Series =

Motor racing competition in Germany

The 2015 ADAC Procar Series is the twenty-first season of the ADAC Procar Series, the German championship for touring cars. For this season Super 2000 cars were banned. The season consisted of eight separate race weekends with two races each, spread over eight different tracks.

== Teams and drivers ==
Team	Car	No.	Drivers	Rounds
Division 1
(Germany) Wolf Racing	Ford Fiesta ST	1	(Germany) Heiko Hammel	All
(Switzerland) Vukovic Motorsport	Renault Clio IV RS	4	(Switzerland) Milenko Vukovic	1, 3–7
(Germany) LB-Racing	Ford Fiesta ST	7	(Germany) Johannes Leidinger	All
(Germany) H&R Team Dombek (Germany) Besapalast Team Dombek	Mini John Cooper Works	8	(Germany) Kai Jordan	1–6, 8
(Germany) H&R Team Dombek (Germany) Besapalast Team Dombek	Mini John Cooper Works	9	(Sweden) Fredrik Lestrup	All
(Germany) H&R Team Dombek (Germany) Besapalast Team Dombek	Mini John Cooper Works	10	(Croatia) Franjo Kovac	All
(Germany) Caisley AEG ID	Mini John Cooper Works	17	(Germany) Reinhard Nehls	All
Division 2
(Germany) ETH Tuning	Citroën Saxo VTS	86	(Germany) Andreas Rinke	1–2, 4–8
(Germany) ETH Tuning	Peugeot 207 Sport	68	(Germany) Michael Krings	1
(Germany) ETH Tuning	Peugeot 207 Sport	77	(Germany) Kevin Hilgenhövel	2–8
(Germany) ETH Tuning	Peugeot 207 Sport	81	(Germany) Matthias Meyer	2–4
(Germany) ETH Tuning	Ford Fiesta ST	81	(Germany) Matthias Meyer	5
(Germany) Glatzel Racing	Ford Fiesta ST	81	(Germany) Matthias Meyer	1
(Germany) Glatzel Racing	Ford Fiesta ST	82	(Germany) Steffen Schwan	3–4, 6–7
(Germany) Glatzel Racing	Ford Fiesta ST	85	(Germany) Arno Dahm	8
(Germany) Glatzel Racing	Ford Fiesta ST	88	(Germany) Dominique Schaak	All
(Germany) Glatzel Racing	Ford Fiesta 1.6 16V	79	(Germany) Ronny Reinsberger	1–6
(Germany) Glatzel Racing	Ford Fiesta 1.6 16V	83	(Germany) Ralf Glatzel	All
Division 3
(Germany) Heide Motorsport	Mini John Cooper Works	31	(Germany) Michael Heide	1–2, 5, 7–8
(Germany) Heide Motorsport	Mini John Cooper Works	32	(Germany) Ingo Kampmann	2, 5, 7–8
(Germany) Heide Motorsport	Mini John Cooper Works	45	(Germany) Nils Ballerstein	1–2, 5
(Germany) IMC Motorsport	Mini John Cooper Works	33	(Germany) Victoria Froß	All
(Germany) IMC Motorsport	Mini John Cooper Works	50	(Germany) Jeremy Krüger	All
(Germany) Frensch Power Motorsport	Mini John Cooper Works	37	(Germany) Martin Heidrich	7
(Germany) Frensch Power Motorsport	Mini John Cooper Works	41	(Germany) Steve Kirsch	All
(Germany) Frensch Power Motorsport	Mini John Cooper Works	55	(Austria) Bernhard Wagner	All
(Germany) Team Steve Kirsch Motorsport	Mini John Cooper Works	42	(Germany) René Münnich	6
(Germany) Team Steve Kirsch Motorsport	Mini John Cooper Works	49	(Germany) Niki Schelle	5
(Germany) Mini Racing Team	Mini John Cooper Works	44	(Germany) Dirk Lauth	All

== Race calendar and results ==
Round		Circuit	Date	Pole position	Fastest lap	Winning driver	Winning team
1	R1	(Germany) Motorsport Arena Oschersleben	27 April	(Sweden) Fredrik Lestrup	(Sweden) Fredrik Lestrup	(Sweden) Fredrik Lestrup	(Germany) Besapalast Team Dombek
1	R2	(Germany) Motorsport Arena Oschersleben	27 April		(Germany) Heiko Hammel	(Sweden) Fredrik Lestrup	(Germany) Besapalast Team Dombek
2	R1	(Belgium) Circuit Zolder	7 June	(Sweden) Fredrik Lestrup	(Sweden) Fredrik Lestrup	(Sweden) Fredrik Lestrup	(Germany) Besapalast Team Dombek
2	R2	(Belgium) Circuit Zolder	7 June		(Sweden) Fredrik Lestrup	(Sweden) Fredrik Lestrup	(Germany) Besapalast Team Dombek
3	R1	(Germany) Lausitzring	5 July	(Sweden) Fredrik Lestrup	(Switzerland) Milenko Vukovic	(Sweden) Fredrik Lestrup	(Germany) Besapalast Team Dombek
3	R2	(Germany) Lausitzring	5 July		(Switzerland) Milenko Vukovic	(Germany) Heiko Hammel	(Germany) Wolf Racing
4	R1	(Austria) Salzburgring	26 July	(Sweden) Fredrik Lestrup	(Sweden) Fredrik Lestrup	(Sweden) Fredrik Lestrup	(Germany) Besapalast Team Dombek
4	R2	(Austria) Salzburgring	26 July		(Sweden) Fredrik Lestrup	(Switzerland) Milenko Vukovic	(Switzerland) Vukovic Motorsport
5	R1	(Germany) Nürburgring	16 August	(Sweden) Fredrik Lestrup	(Sweden) Fredrik Lestrup	(Sweden) Fredrik Lestrup	(Germany) Besapalast Team Dombek
5	R2	(Germany) Nürburgring	16 August		(Sweden) Fredrik Lestrup	(Germany) Kai Jordan	(Germany) H&R Team Dombek
6	R1	(Germany) Sachsenring	30 August	(Sweden) Fredrik Lestrup	(Sweden) Fredrik Lestrup	(Sweden) Fredrik Lestrup	(Germany) Besapalast Team Dombek
6	R2	(Germany) Sachsenring	30 August		(Sweden) Fredrik Lestrup	(Sweden) Fredrik Lestrup	(Germany) Besapalast Team Dombek
7	R1	(Netherlands) Circuit Park Zandvoort	20 September	(Germany) Heiko Hammel	(Sweden) Fredrik Lestrup	(Sweden) Fredrik Lestrup	(Germany) Besapalast Team Dombek
7	R2	(Netherlands) Circuit Park Zandvoort	20 September		(Sweden) Fredrik Lestrup	(Sweden) Fredrik Lestrup	(Germany) Besapalast Team Dombek
8	R1	(Belgium) Circuit de Spa-Francorchamps	4 October	(Germany) Heiko Hammel	(Germany) Heiko Hammel	(Sweden) Fredrik Lestrup	(Germany) Besapalast Team Dombek
8	R2	(Belgium) Circuit de Spa-Francorchamps	4 October		(Germany) Heiko Hammel	(Germany) Heiko Hammel	(Germany) Wolf Racing

== Championship standings ==
=== Drivers' Championship ===
Pos	Driver	OSC (Germany)		ZOL (Belgium)		LAU (Germany)		SAL (Austria)		NÜR (Germany)		SAC (Germany)		ZAN (Netherlands)		SPA (Belgium)		Points
Division 1
1	(Sweden) Fredrik Lestrup	1	1	1	1	1	DNS	1	4	1	3	1	1	1	1	1	Ret	154
2	(Germany) Heiko Hammel	2	2	3	5	2	1	6	2	3	DNS	7	4	NC	2	6	1	96
3	(Germany) Johannes Leidinger	3	3	4	3	5	4	4	5	6	2	3	2	3	4	2	3	91
4	(Croatia) Franjo Kovac	5	4	5	4	4	2	3	3	5	4	6	5	4	3	3	5	80
5	(Germany) Kai Jordan	DNS	DNS	2	2	6	3	5	DNS	4	1	4	DNS			5	2	61
6	(Germany) Reinhard Nehls	4	5	6	Ret	DNS	DNS	DNS	Ret	7	5	5	3	2	5	4	4	50
7	(Switzerland) Milenko Vukovic	DNS	DNS			3	5	2	1	2	Ret	2	DNS	DNS	DNS			46
Division 2
1	(Germany) Ralf Glatzel	5	Ret	1	1	1	1	2	2	2	1	2	1	2	2	1	1	140
2	(Germany) Andreas Rinke	2	1	2	DNS			1	1	1	5	1	3	1	1	Ret	DNS	116
3	(Germany) Dominique Schaak	3	4	5	3	2	2	5	4	4	4	Ret	Ret	3	3	3	3	80
4	(Germany) Kevin Hilgenhövel			4	4	3	4	4	Ret	5	3	3	4	4	Ret	2	2	69
5	(Germany) Matthias Meyer	1	2	Ret	2	5	3	3	3	3	2							65
6	(Germany) Ronny Reinsberger	Ret	Ret	3	5	4	Ret	6	5	Ret	DNS	4	2					35
7	(Germany) Michael Krings	4	3															11
8	(Germany) Steffen Schwan					Ret	5	DNS	6			Ret	DNS	DNS	DNS			7
9	(Germany) Arno Dahm															Ret	4	5
Division 3
1	(Germany) Steve Kirsch	1	1	1	1	1	1	1	1	1	1	1	1	1	1	1	1	191
2	(Germany) Dirk Lauth	5	2	2	4	3	3	2	3	4	3	2	2	2	2	2	4	108
3	(Austria) Bernhard Wagner	3	4	4	2	2	2	4	2	2	4	3	3	3	3	3	2	104
4	(Germany) Jeremy Krüger	7	6	8	6	4	4	3	Ret	6	9	5	5	6	6	7	4	49
5	(Germany) Victoria Froß	6	Ret	6	7	5	5	5	4	8	7	6	6	7	7	6	3	47
6	(Germany) Nils Ballerstein	2	3	3	3					3	2							40
7	(Germany) Michael Heide	4	5	5	5					7	8			5	5	5	5	36
8	(Germany) Ingo Kampmann			7	DNS					9	6			8	8	7	6	12
9	(Germany) René Münnich											4	4					10
10	(Germany) Martin Heidrich													4	4			10
11	(Germany) Niki Schelle									5	5							8
Pos	Driver	OSC (Germany)		ZOL (Belgium)		LAU (Germany)		SAL (Austria)		NÜR (Germany)		SAC (Germany)		ZAN (Netherlands)		SPA (Belgium)		Points

Colour	Result
Gold	Winner
Silver	Second place
Bronze	Third place
Green	Points finish
Blue	Non-points finish
Blue	Non-classified finish (NC)
Purple	Retired (Ret)
Red	Did not qualify (DNQ)
Red	Did not pre-qualify (DNPQ)
Black	Disqualified (DSQ)
White	Did not start (DNS)
White	Withdrew (WD)
White	Race cancelled (C)
Blank	Did not practice (DNP)
Blank	Did not arrive (DNA)
Blank	Excluded (EX)

Position	1st	2nd	3rd	4th	5th	6th	7th	8th
Points	10	8	6	5	4	3	2	1
