= Deutscher Tourenwagen Cup =

- Category: Touring cars
- Country: Germany
- Inaugural season: 1995
- Folded: 2017
- Last Drivers' champion: (Sweden) Fredrik Lestrup
- Last Teams' champion: (Germany) Besapalast Team Dombek
- Official website: dtc-series.de

The Deutsche Tourenwagen Cup (DTC, formerly known as ADAC Procar Series) was a yearly motorsport series in Germany and some surrounding countries. The series began in 1995 and folded in 2017.

== Current status ==
The DTC was the highest level of German motorsport that ran cars to the Super 2000 regulations used in World Touring Car Championship (WTCC). To fill up the grid, and to promote new, young drivers the few Super 2000 cars were joined by the less advanced Division 2 and 3 series (the Super 2000 cars being called Division 1), bringing up the total number of starting drivers to around 20 to 25. Division 1 also allowed cars of BTCC-spec – the 2005 champion Mathias Schläppi won in a BTCC-built MG ZS.

As of 2016 there are 3 different classes in the DTC

- Superproduction - 1.6 L, turbocharged cars up to 300 Bhp
- Production 1 - 1.6 L, turbocharged cars up to 230 Bhp
- Production 2 - 2.0 L, turbocharged cars up to 260 Bhp

== History ==
The DTC began 1995 as a championship for Super Production cars under the name DTC (Deutsche Tourenwagen Challenge). Ford and Hotfiel Sport had an important presence in the early and middle parts of the history of the series with Thomas Klenke winning the championship in 2002. The series was called the DMSB Produktionswagen Meisterschaft in 2004 and raced in two rounds of the European Touring Car Championship.

The 2005 season saw the introduction of Super 2000 rules for Division 1 and the series changed its name to the DMSB Produktionswagen Meisterschaft. Mathias Schläppi in a MG ZS for Maurer Motorsport was the undisputed champion, winning 12 out of 16 races. 2006 saw Maurer Motorsport swapping their MG's for Chevrolet's and Mathias Schläppi for ex-BTCC driver Vincent Radermecker. Schläppi instead drove for the new TFS-Yaco team running Toyota Corollas. Vincent Radermecker would win Maurer's second title while Schläppi was second in the championship.

While the DTC features some drivers and teams—such as Radermecker, Schläppi, and Maurer Motorsport—it remains a minor series compared to the more popular DTM.

== Scoring system ==
- Below is the scoring system used for the results of each race during the 2010 season:

Position	1st	2nd	3rd	4th	5th	6th	7th	8th
Points	10	8	6	5	4	3	2	1

== Champions ==
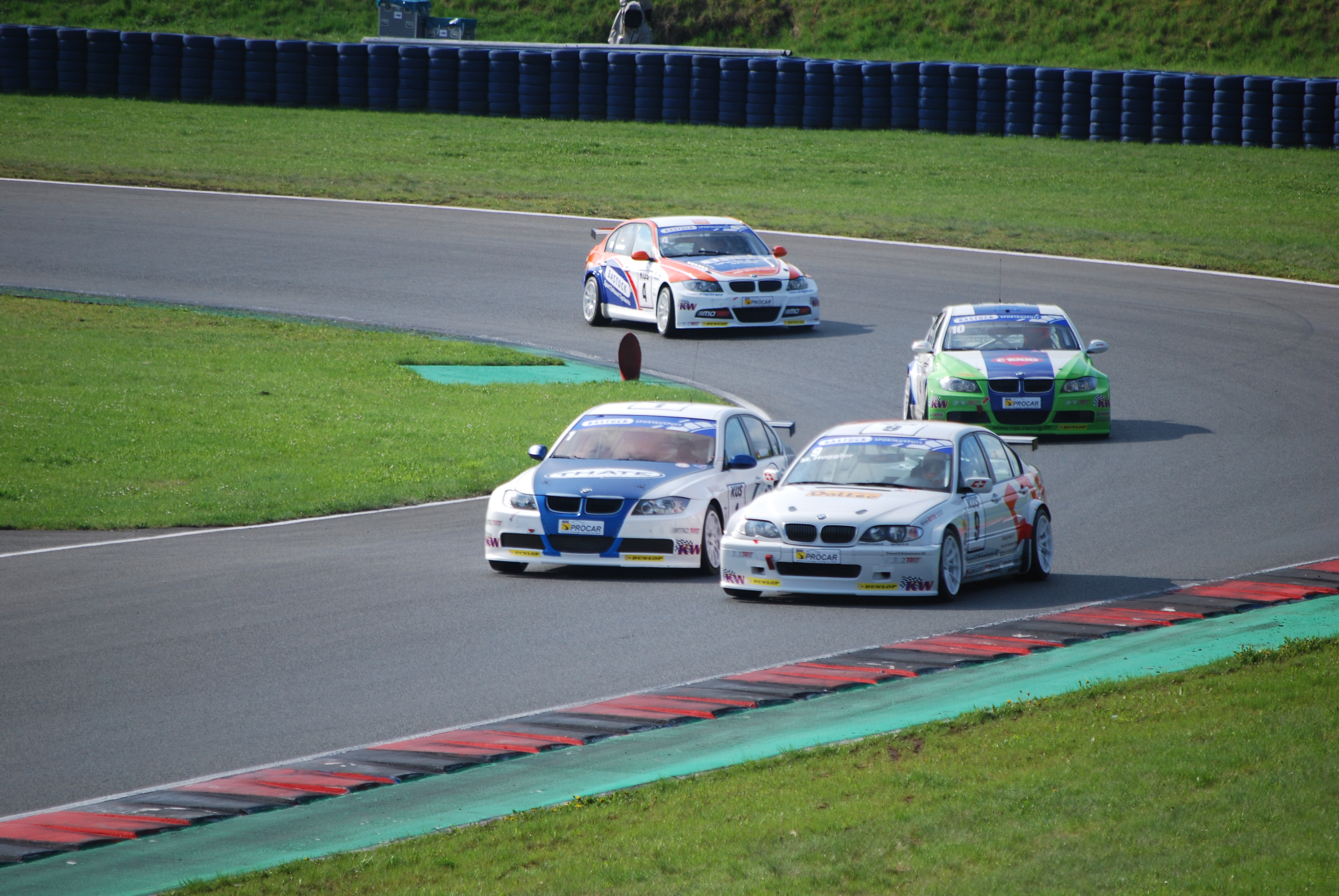
Division 1 2013

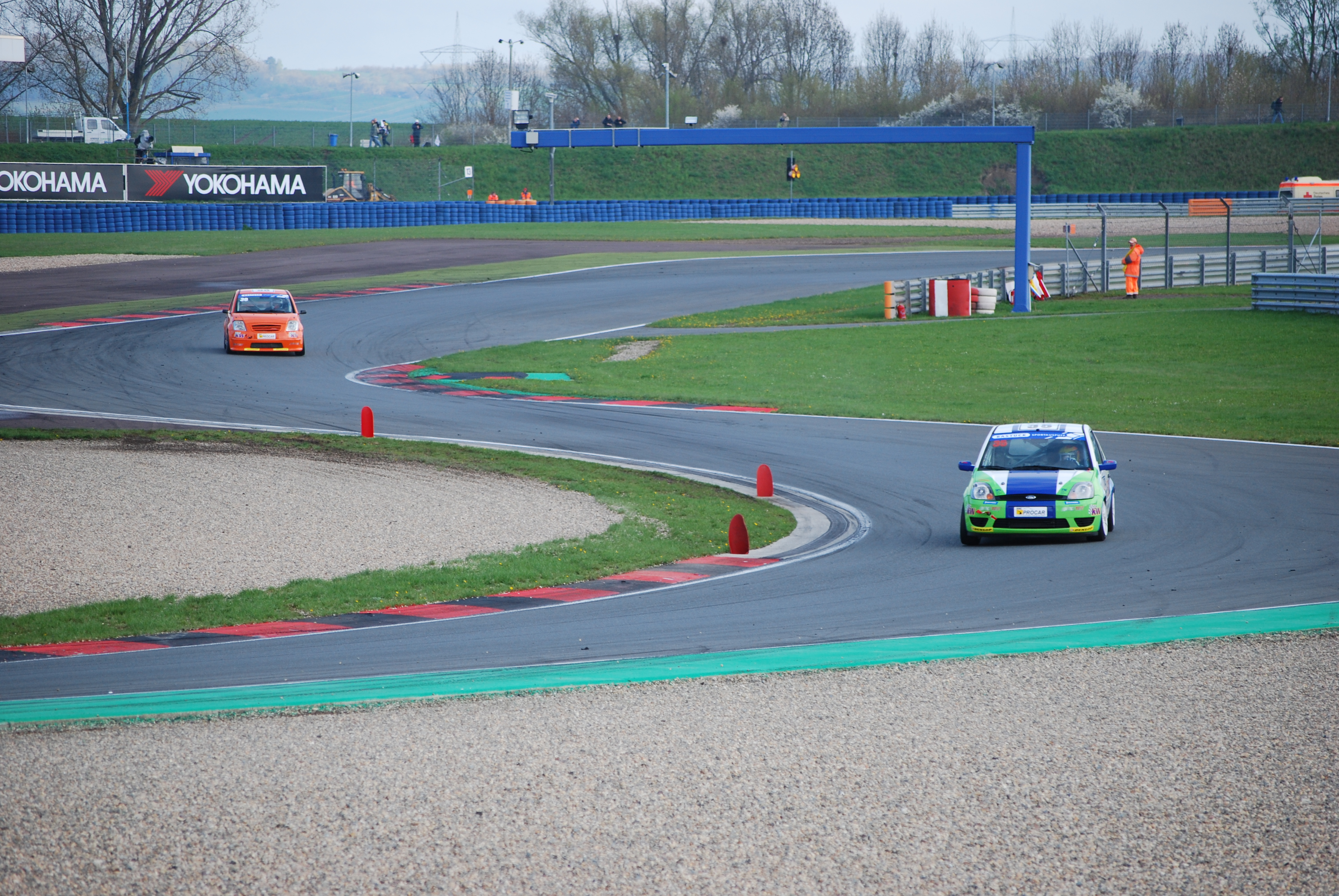
Division 2 2013

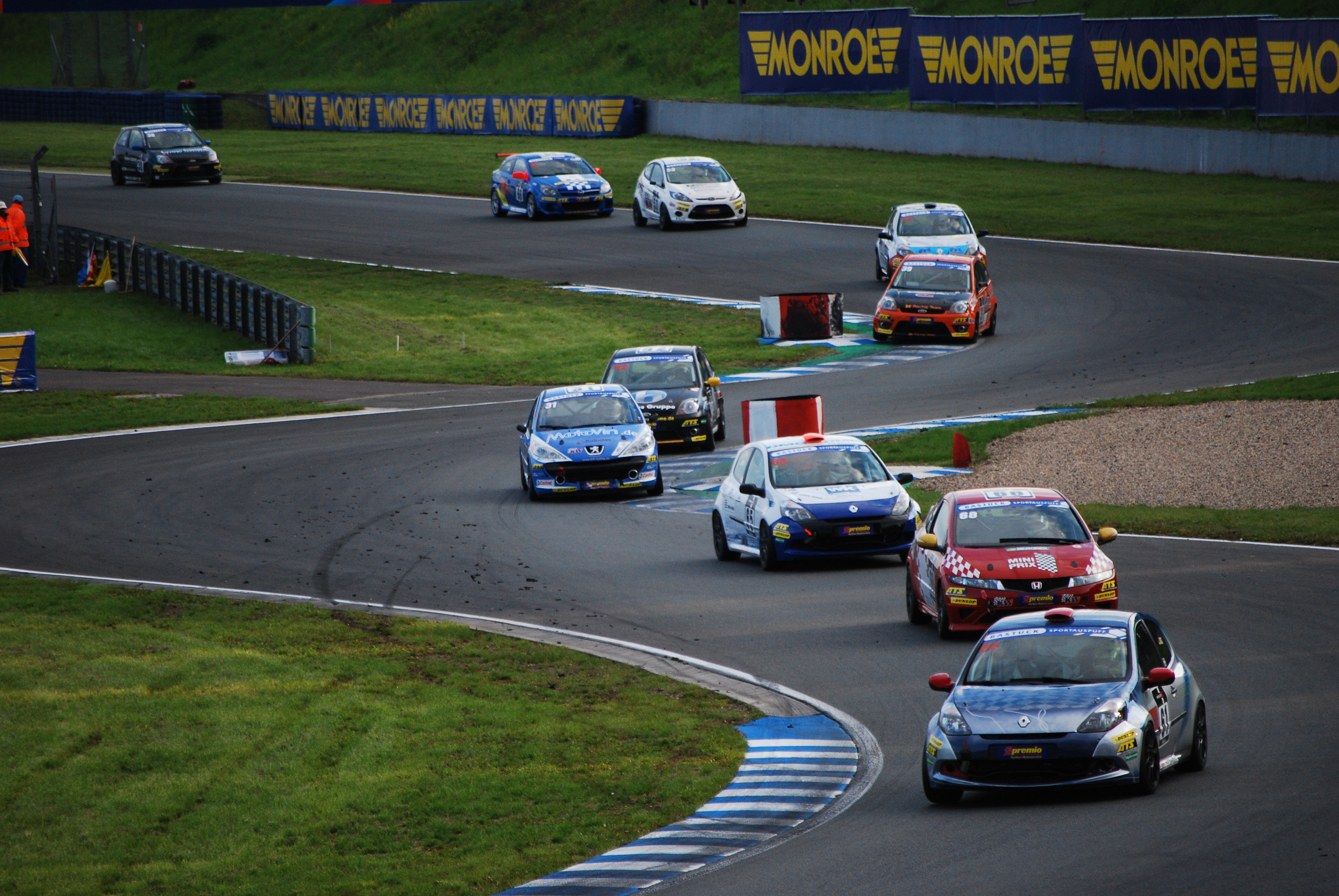
Division 3 2010

Season	Champion	Car	Team Champion
1995	(Germany) Mario Hebler	Renault Clio Williams	(Germany) Arkenau Motorsport
1996	(Germany) Jürgen Hohenester	Volkswagen Golf GTI	(Germany) Hohenester Motorsport
1997	(Germany) Jürgen Hohenester	Volkswagen Golf GTI	(Germany) Hohenester Motorsport
1998	(Germany) Thomas Winkelhock	BMW 320i	(Netherlands) Brinkmann Motorsport
1999	(Germany) Jürgen Hohenester	Volkswagen Golf GTI	(Germany) Hohenester Motorsport
2000	(Germany) Franz Engstler	BMW 320i	(Germany) Bertrand Schäfer Racing
2001	(Germany) Markus Gedlich	BMW 320i	(Germany) Schubert Motors
2002	(Germany) Thomas Klenke	Ford Focus	(Germany) Hotfiel Sport
2003	(Germany) Claudia Hürtgen	BMW 320i	(Germany) Schubert Motors
2004	(Germany) Claudia Hürtgen	BMW 320i	(Germany) Schubert Motors
2005	(Switzerland) Mathias Schläppi	MG ZS	(Switzerland) Maurer Motorsport
2006	(Belgium) Vincent Radermecker	Chevrolet Lacetti	(Switzerland) Maurer Motorsport
2007	(Germany) Franz Engstler	BMW 320i	(Germany) Engstler Motorsport
2008	(Germany) Philip Geipel	Toyota Auris	(Germany) TFS Yaco Racing
2009	(Switzerland) Remo Friberg	BMW 320i	(Germany) Liqui Moly Team Engstler
2010	(Germany) Roland Hertner	BMW 320si	(Germany) Liqui Moly Team Engstler
2011	(Germany) Johannes Leidinger	BMW 320si E90	(Germany) Liqui Moly Team Engstler
2012	(Germany) Jens Guido Weimann	BMW 320si E90	(Germany) Thate Motorsport
2013	(Germany) Jens Guido Weimann	BMW 320si E90	(Germany) Thate Motorsport
2014	(Germany) Heiko Hammel	Ford Fiesta ST	(Germany) Wolf Racing
2015	(Sweden) Fredrik Lestrup	Mini John Cooper Works	(Germany) Besapalast Team Dombek
2016	(Switzerland) Milenko Vukovic	Audi S3 Saloon	(Switzerland) Vukovic Motorsport

== See also ==
- V8Star Series
- Formula König
- ADAC Formel Masters
- Volkswagen Scirocco R-Cup
