= Claudia Hürtgen =

German racing driver (born 1971)

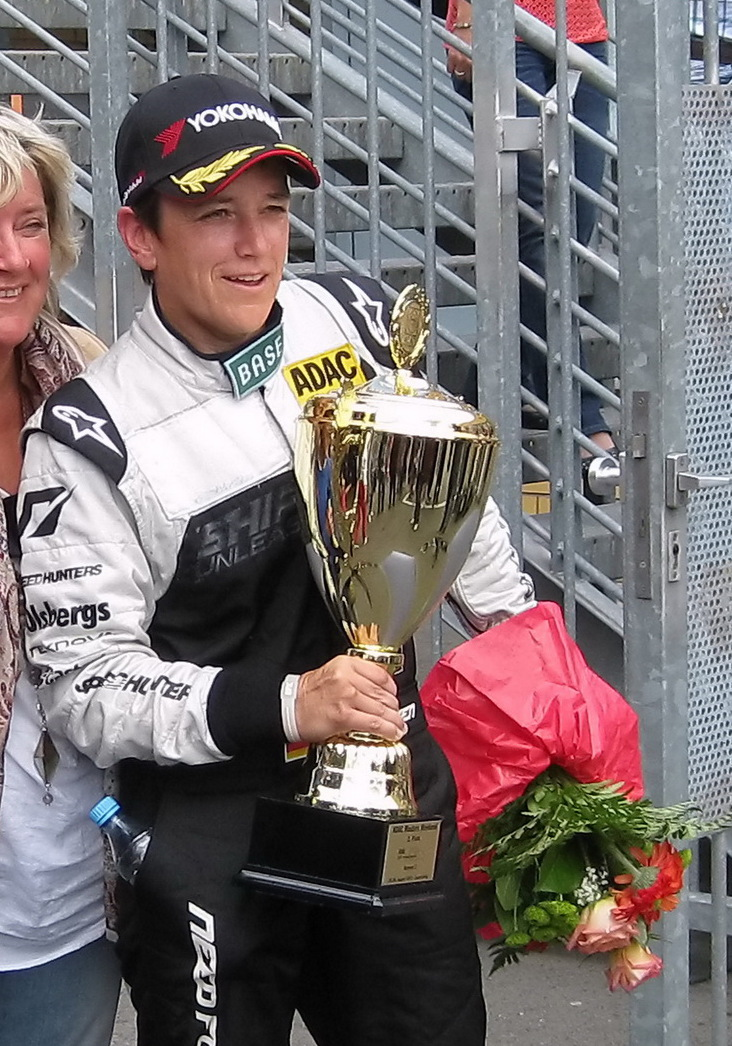
- Hürtgen in 2012
- Nationality: German
- Born: Claudia Dorothea Hürtgen; 10 September 1971 (age 55) Aachen, West Germany
- Relatives: Elia Weiss (son)
- Categorisation: FIA Silver

Claudia Dorothea Hürtgen (born 10 September 1971 in Aachen) is a German racing driver. A long-term BMW driver for Schubert, she won the VLN Series title in 2005, and five ADAC GT Masters races from 2012 to 2014. In 2011, she took the BMW Z4 GT3's first major win at the Dubai 24 Hour and finished second at the Spa 24 Hours.

Hürtgen previously had her single-seater career curtailed by a crash at Monaco, and became an LMP675 specialist in the American Le Mans Series. In 2021, she expanded to off-road racing in Extreme E.

== Biography ==
Hürtgen started her career in karting and moved to German Formula Three. In 1993, during the F3 invitational race of the Monaco Grand Prix weekend, she suffered hand injuries in a roll-over crash, which ended her single-seater career.

Hürtgen began racing again with touring cars in 1995, winning the Austrian championship, followed with sports car racing, in which she scored class wins, in an LMP-675 class car or a Porsche, in the American Le Mans Series as well as in the 24 Hours of Daytona and the 24 Hours of Le Mans.

In 2000, Hürtgen returned to the site of her crash, to win the Monaco Historic Grand Prix in a Maserati.

Between 2003 and 2004, Hürtgen was champion in Germany's Deutsche Tourenwagen Challenge (DTC), later renamed to DMSB-Produktionswagen-Meisterschaft (DPM).

In 2005, Team Schubert and Hürtgen moved on the VLN endurance racing series on the Nürburgring Nordschleife. Hürtgen won the VLN championship in 2005, making her the first female champion since Sabine Schmitz in 1998.

At the 2006 24 Hours Nürburgring, Hürtgen drove two cars for a total of 11 hours, scoring fifth place among 220 cars with a 245 bhp BMW 120d.

2011 saw Hürtgen compete with Team Schubert (as Team Need for Speed) in the FIA GT3 European Championship and in various endurance races. She won the Dubai 24 Hour and finished second overall at the Spa 24 Hours having started from 49th on the grid, in addition to her three podiums in the FIA GT3 season.

In 2021, Hürtgen was set to compete in Extreme E with ABT CUPRA XE alongside Mattias Ekström. She only took part in the opening event, the 2021 Desert X-Prix.

Hürtgen won the Série A2 (open to pre-1961 front-engined Grand Prix cars) race of the 2022 Historic Grand Prix of Monaco, onboard a Ferrari 246.

== Racing record ==
=== 24 Hours of Nürburgring results ===
Year	Team	Co-Drivers	Car	Class	Laps	Pos.	Class Pos.
1990		(Germany) Dirk Ehlebracht (Germany) Michael Schmölders (Germany) Ingrid Steger	Ford Fiesta XR2i	Class 4	28	DNF	DNF
1991	(Germany) S&P Scharpmann Ford Kuhn	(Germany) Michael Funke (Luxembourg) Jenny van Hilten (Germany) Thomas Wirtz	Ford Fiesta XR2i	Class 4	115	52nd	7th
1991		(Germany) Franz-Josef Bröhling Jr. (Germany) Jens Scheefeldt (Germany) Achim Stegmüller	Ford Fiesta XR2i	Class 4	114	54th	8th
1992	(Germany) Wolf Racing	(Germany) Karl-Heinz Hufstadt (Germany) Bernd Ostmann (Germany) Arno Wester	Ford Sierra Cosworth 4x4	Class 7	53	138th	7th
1995	(Germany) Wolf Racing	(Germany) Olaf Lübke (Germany) Thomas Voigt (Germany) Manfred Zimmermann	Ford Escort RS2000	Class 4	114	24th	5th
1999	(Germany) Carlsson Racing	(Switzerland) Florence Duez (Germany) Jutta Kleinschmidt (Germany) Ellen Lohr	Mercedes-Benz SLK	Si2	131	7th	**1st**
2000	(Germany) Ford Wolf Racing	(Germany) Michael Funke (Germany) Thomas Klenke	Ford Focus	A3	22	152nd	26th
2001	(Germany) Sakura 2000	(Germany) Jo Albig (Sweden) Ingvar Carlsson (Germany) Ellen Lohr	Honda S2000	A3	132	9th	**1st**
2003	(Germany) BMW Motorsport	(Belgium) Marc Duez (Germany) Jörg Müller (Germany) Dirk Müller	BMW M3 GTR	E1	126	DNF	DNF
2004	(Germany) Scuderia Augustusburg Brühl e.V. im ADAC	(Germany) Oliver Kainz (Germany) Mario Merten (Germany) Johannes Scheid	BMW M3 GTRS	A7	36	DNF	DNF
2004		(Germany) Ralph Bohnhorst (Germany) Torsten Schubert (Germany) Thomas Winkelhock	BMW Z3 M Coupé	A6	106	99th	13th
2005	(Germany) Motopark Oschersleben	(Sweden) Thed Björk (Sweden) Richard Göransson (Germany) Torsten Schubert	BMW 320i	A3	123	15th	**2nd**
2005	(Germany) Motopark Oschersleben	(Germany) Ralph Bohnhorst (Germany) Marc Hennerici (Germany) Torsten Schubert	BMW 320i	A3	126	11th	**1st**
2006	(Germany) Motorsport Arena Oschersleben	(Germany) Marc Hennerici (Germany) Torsten Schubert (Austria) Johannes Stuck	BMW 120d	S1	138	5th	**1st**
2006	(Germany) Motorsport Arena Oschersleben	(Germany) Reinhard Huber (Germany) Guido Thierfelder (Germany) Jochen Übler	BMW 120d	S1	24	DNF	DNF
2007	(Germany) Motorsport Arena Oschersleben	(Sweden) Richard Göransson (Germany) Hans-Joachim Stuck (Austria) Johannes Stuck	BMW Z4 M Coupé	SP6	106	5th	**1st**
2008	(Germany) Motorsport Arena Oschersleben	(Sweden) Richard Göransson (Norway) Stian Sørlie (Germany) Jörg Viebahn	BMW Z4 M Coupé	SP6	53	DNF	DNF
2009	(Germany) Motorsport Arena Oschersleben	(Brazil) Augusto Farfus (Germany) Dirk Müller (Norway) Stian Sørlie	BMW Z4 M Coupé	SP6	38	DNF	DNF
2010	(Germany) Schubert Motorsport	(Sweden) Richard Göransson (Norway) Stian Sørlie (Germany) Jörg Viebahn	BMW Z4 GT3	SP9	12	DNF	DNF
2011	(Germany) Need for Speed Team Schubert	(Netherlands) Tom Coronel (Germany) Marco Hartung (Germany) Jörg Viebahn	BMW Z4 GT3	SP9	114	DNF	DNF
2011	(Germany) Need for Speed Team Schubert	(Sweden) Fredrik Larsson (United States) Tommy Milner (Sweden) Edward Sandström	BMW Z4 GT3	SP9	61	DNF	DNF
2012	(Germany) BMW Team Schubert	(Germany) Dirk Adorf (Germany) Nico Bastian (Germany) Dominik Schwager	BMW Z4 GT3	SP9	150	8th	8th
2013	(Germany) BMW Team Schubert	(Germany) Uwe Alzen (Brazil) Augusto Farfus (Germany) Dirk Müller	BMW Z4 GT3	SP9	8	DNF	DNF
2013	(Germany) BMW Team Schubert	(Germany) Dirk Adorf (Germany) Jens Klingmann (Germany) Martin Tomczyk	BMW Z4 GT3	SP9	87	6th	6th
2014	(Germany) BMW Team Schubert	(Austria) Dominik Baumann (Germany) Jens Klingmann (Germany) Martin Tomczyk	BMW Z4 GT3	SP9	157	6th	6th
2015	(Germany) BMW Sports Trophy Team Schubert	(Austria) Dominik Baumann (Germany) Jens Klingmann (Germany) Martin Tomczyk	BMW Z4 GT3	SP9	23	DNF	DNF
2019	(Switzerland) Hofor Racing by Bonk Motorsport	(Austria) Michael Fischer (Austria) Thomas Jäger (Germany) Michael Schrey	BMW M4 GT4	SP10	142	24th	**2nd**
2020	(Switzerland) Hofor Racing by Bonk Motorsport	(Austria) Michael Fischer (Germany) Michael Schrey (Germany) Sebastian von Gartzen	BMW M4 GT4	SP10	76	26th	**1st**

=== 24 Hours of Le Mans results ===
Year	Team	Co-Drivers	Car	Class	Laps	Pos.	Class Pos.
1997	(Switzerland) GT Racing Team AG (Germany) Roock Racing	(United Kingdom) John Robinson (United Kingdom) Hugh Price	Porsche 911 GT2	GT2	280	13th	4th
1998	(Germany) Roock Racing	(France) Michel Ligonnet (United Kingdom) Robert Nearn	Porsche 911 GT2	GT2	285	17th	**3rd**
1999	(Germany) Roock Racing	(Germany) André Ahrlé (Belgium) Vincent Vosse	Porsche 911 GT2	GTS	290	20th	8th
2001	(United States) KnightHawk Racing (Germany) Roock Racing International	(United States) Rick Fairbank (United States) Chris Gleason	Lola B2K/40-Nissan	LMP675	94	DNF	DNF

=== Complete ADAC GT Masters results ===
(key) (Races in bold indicate pole position) (Races in italics indicate fastest lap)

Year	Team	Car	1	2	3	4	5	6	7	8	9	10	11	12	13	14	15	16	DC	Points
2009	Alpina	BMW Alpina B6 GT3	OSC1; 1	OSC1; 2	ASS; 1	ASS; 2	HOC; 1	HOC; 2	LAU; 1	LAU; 2	NÜR; 1	NÜR; 2	SAC; 1	SAC; 2	OSC2; 1; 1	OSC2; 2; 1			NC†	0†
2010	s-Berg Racing	Alpina B6 GT3	OSC1; 1; 12	OSC1; 2; 17	SAC; 1	SAC; 2	HOC; 1	HOC; 2	ASS; 1	ASS; 2	LAU; 1	LAU; 2							NC†	0†
2010	Need for Speed by Schubert	BMW Z4 GT3											NÜR; 1; 13	NÜR; 2; 18	OSC2; 1; 9	OSC2; 2; 5			NC†	0†
2012	Schubert Motorsport	BMW Z4 GT3	OSC; 1; 2	OSC; 2; 11	ZAN; 1; 16	ZAN; 2; 2	SAC; 1 Ret	SAC; 2; 6	NÜR; 1; 6	NÜR; 2; 6	RBR; 1; 17	RBR; 2; 10	LAU; 1; 8	LAU; 2; 2	NÜR; 1; 14	NÜR; 2; 7	HOC; 1; 1	HOC; 2; 4	5th	126
2013	PIXUM Team Schubert	BMW Z4 GT3	OSC; 1; 8	OSC; 2; 7	SPA; 1; 7	SPA; 2; 1	SAC; 1; 13	SAC; 2; 2	NÜR; 1; 11	NÜR; 2; 1	RBR; 1; 19	RBR; 2; 22	LAU; 1; 2	LAU; 2; 2	SVK; 1; 3	SVK; 2; 10	HOC; 1; 4	HOC; 2 Ret	5th	148
2014	PIXUM Team Schubert	BMW Z4 GT3	OSC; 1; 6	OSC; 2; 3	ZAN; 1; 4	ZAN; 2; 5	LAU; 1; 4	**LAU**; **2**; 1	RBR; 1; 20	RBR; 2; 4	SLO; 1; 1	SLO; 2; 3	NÜR; 1; 9	NÜR; 2; 15	SAC; 1; 3	SAC; 2; 6	HOC; 1; 6	HOC; 2; 5	4th	177
2015	BMW Sports Trophy Team Schubert	BMW Z4 GT3	OSC; 1; 6	OSC; 2; 5	RBR; 1; 8	RBR; 2; 9	SPA; 1; 5	SPA; 2; 6	LAU; 1; 3	LAU; 2; 8	NÜR; 1; 6	NÜR; 2 Ret	**SAC**; **1**; 2	SAC; 2; 14	ZAN; 1; 13	ZAN; 2 Ret	HOC; 1 Ret	HOC; 2 DNS	11th	91
2016	Schubert Motorsport	BMW M6 GT3	OSC; 1	OSC; 2	SAC; 1	SAC; 2	LAU; 1 Ret	LAU; 2; 20	RBR; 1	RBR; 2	NÜR; 1	NÜR; 2	ZAN; 1; 21	ZAN; 2; 9	HOC; 1	HOC; 2			50th	2
2018	RWT Racing	Corvette C7 GT3-R	OSC; 1; 24	OSC; 2; 15	MST; 1; 8	MST; 2; 17	RBR; 1; 31	RBR; 2; 19	NÜR; 1 Ret	NÜR; 2; 19	ZAN; 1 Ret	ZAN; 2; 28	SAC; 1; 19	SAC; 2; 24	HOC; 1; 6	HOC; 2 Ret			29th	12

^{†} As Hürtgen was a guest driver, she was ineligible for championship points.

=== 24 Hours of Spa results ===
Year	Team	Co-Drivers	Car	Class	Laps	Pos.	Class Pos.
2011	(Germany) Need for Speed Team Schubert	(Sweden) Edward Sandström (Germany) Dirk Werner	BMW Z4 GT3	GT3; Pro	543	**2nd**	**2nd**

=== Complete Extreme E results ===
(key)

Year	Team	Car	1	2	3	4	5	6	7	8	9	10	Pos.	Points
2021	Abt Cupra XE	Spark ODYSSEY 21	DES; Q 8	DES; R 7	OCE; Q WD	OCE; R WD	ARC; Q	ARC; R	ISL; Q	ISL; R	JUR; Q	JUR; R	13th	13

Sporting positions
Preceded by Thomas Klenke	ADAC Procar Series Champion; 2003–2004	Succeeded by Mathias Schläppi
