= Maurer Motorsport =

Swiss auto racing team

(Switzerland) Maurer Motorsport
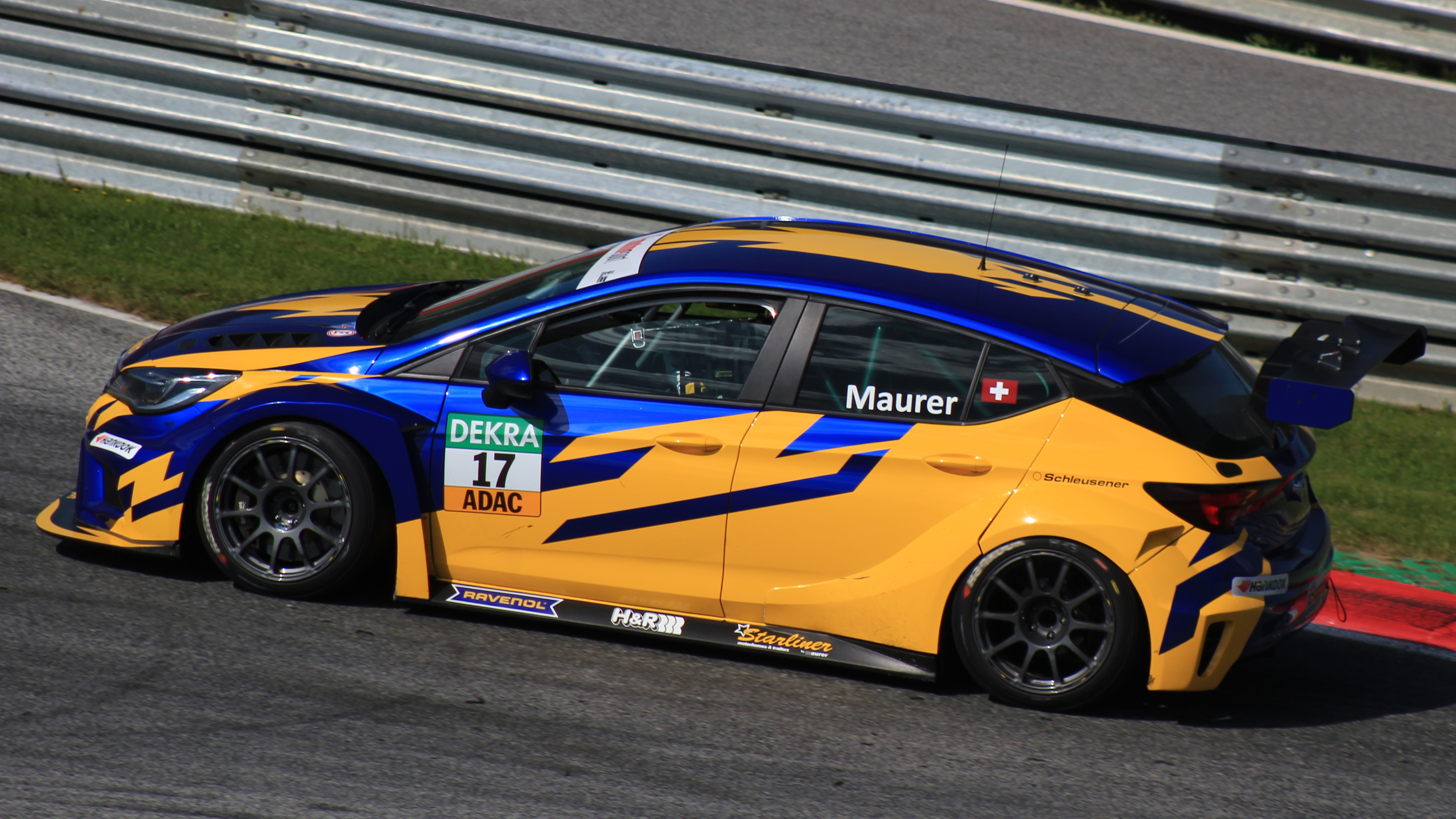
- Team principal(s): Beat Maurer
- Current series: ADAC TCR Germany Touring Car Championship
- Former series: Superstars Series; World Touring Car Championship; ADAC Procar Series
- Current drivers: (Belgium) Vincent Radermecker (Switzerland) Michael Maurer (Netherlands) Niels Langeveld
- Teams' Championships: 2005 ADAC Procar Series; 2006 ADAC Procar Series
- Drivers' Championships: 2005 ADAC Procar Series (Schläppi); 2006 ADAC Procar Series (Radermecker)

Maurer Motorsport is a Swiss auto racing team based in Roggwil. For over ten years the team has been a regular competitor in the ADAC Procar Series. They won the drivers title in 2005 with Mathias Schläppi in a former BTCC works MG ZS with assistance from West Surrey Racing. The team again won the drivers title in 2006 with Vincent Radermecker, this time in a Chevrolet Lacetti.

In 2006 the team also entered Radermecker in selected rounds of the FIA World Touring Car Championship, along with Rainer Bastuck and María de Villota. De Villota, who was their sole driver in 2007, also returned for one round of the WTCC that season.

In 2008 Maurer Motorsport ran a car in the Italian-based Superstars Series for de Villota.

The team has also entered cars in the European Touring Car Cup. In 2006 Lacetti's were entered for Radermecker and Portuguese driver Hugo Godinho at Estoril. They returned in 2009 at Braga with Radermecker and another Portuguese driver José Monroy, although only Monroy competed.
