= Schubert Motorsport =

German auto racing team

(Germany) Schubert Motorsport
- Founded: 1999
- Base: Oschersleben, Germany
- Team principal(s): Torsten Schubert
- Current series: DTM; VLN; ADAC GT Masters; GT4 European Series
- Former series: Deutsche Tourenwagen Challenge; ADAC Procar Series; Toyo Tires 24H Series; FIA GT3 European Championship; Blancpain Sprint Series; Blancpain Endurance Series
- Current drivers: (South Africa) Kelvin van der Linde (Germany) Marco Wittmann
- Teams' Championships: 2001 DTC; 2003 DTC; 2004 DPM; 2015 ADAC GT Masters; 2022 DTM; 2024 DTM
- Drivers' Championships: 2001 DTC; 2003 DTC; 2004 DPM; 2004 ADAC Procar Series; 2005 VLN; 2008 Toyo Tires 24H Series; 2022 DTM

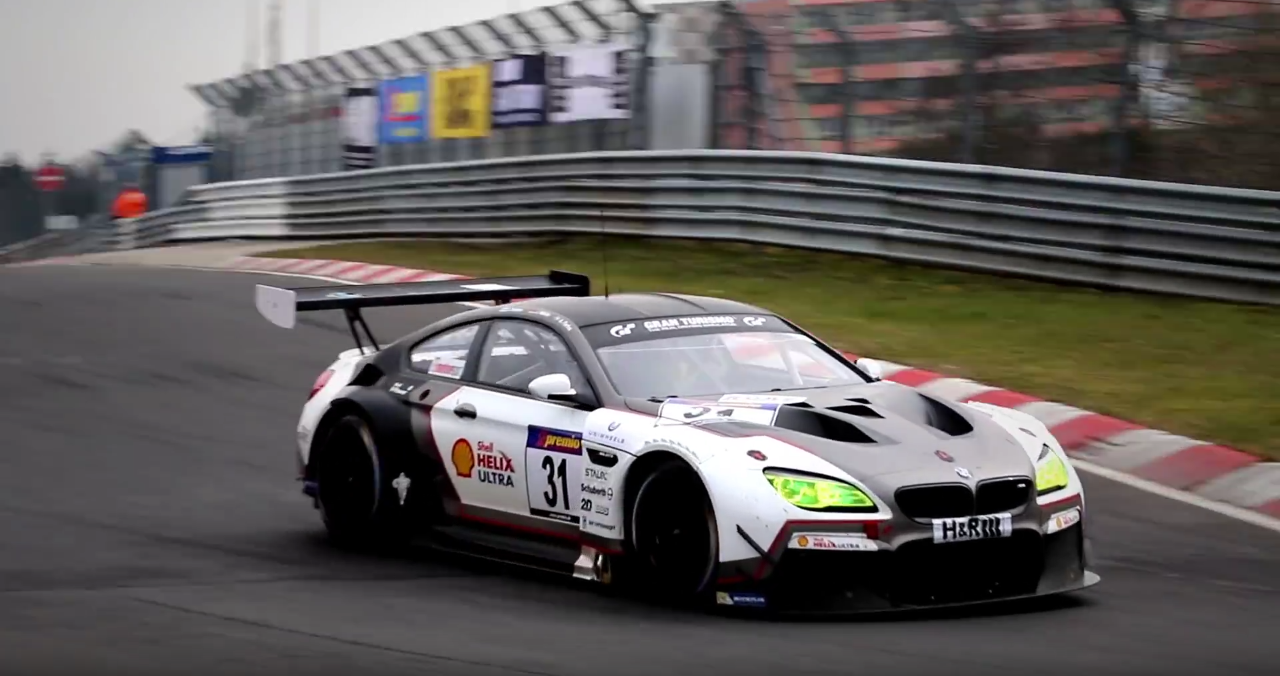
Schubert's works-supported BMW M6 GT3 on the Nürburgring in the VLN, in 2016, driven by Jörg Müller, Marco Wittmann, and Jesse Krohn.

Schubert Motorsport GmbH is a private motorsport team founded and owned by team principal and European Autocross champion Torsten Schubert, and headquartered in Oschersleben, Germany (near the Motorsport Arena). The team has operated as a BMW privateer since its inception in 1999 (except in 2018), with plenty of success, and has specialised in endurance racing since 2004. Although it is closely related to contract BMW associate Schubert Motors GmbH, also owned by Torsten Schubert, they are separate entities.

For much of its earlier years, Schubert focused on touring car racing, taking numerous championships and race wins, including a remarkable 5th-place result and class win at the 2006 Nürburgring 24 Hours. Only beginning in 2007 did Schubert Motorsport initiate regular competition in GT for BMW, starting with the BMW Z4.

In 2012, after five years of GT racing, the manufacturer established Schubert as a works-assisted customer team, which effectively promoted Schubert to a factory team. As a result, Schubert reduced its efforts on touring car racing, occasionally fielding smaller cars at select endurance races from time to time.

Separately, the team used slightly different names during its time. Beginning with the name of the sister company (Schubert Motors) and then the 'Schubert Motorsport' name, the team was well known for racing under the Need for Speed banner as Need for Speed by Schubert Motorsport (alternatively: Need for Speed Team Schubert) in 2010–2011. It carried the namesakes of its sponsors (like 'PIXUM', 'Saudi Falcons', and 'SX' in their respective series) and 'BMW Sports Trophy' for 2014–2015. Since 2016, the team has competed only as 'Schubert Motorsport'.

In 2018, Schubert Motorsport briefly operated as a Honda customer team, having made the switch from BMW and entering a pair of Honda NSX GT3s in the ADAC GT Masters (despite this, Schubert Motors GmbH continued the close relationship with BMW). Nonetheless, Schubert returned to racing with BMW in 2020, following a one-year hiatus from racing, and still continued receiving factory support from the manufacturer.

In 2022, Schubert Motorsport entered the DTM for the first time as the series adopted GT3-based specifications, winning the driver and team titles in their debut year and also winning the team title again in 2024.

== Milestones ==
=== 1999 ===
- Debut in circuit racing.
- DTC (1 win)

=== 2000 ===
- Contested entire DTC season.

=== 2001 ===
- 1st place DTC Drivers and Team classification (Markus Gedlich, BMW 320i)
- First victory with a BMW 320i

=== 2002 ===
- 3rd place DTC Drivers classification (Claudia Hürtgen, BMW 320i)
- 3rd place Guia Race (Franz Engstler, BMW 320i)

=== 2003 ===
- 1st place DTC Drivers and Team classification (Claudia Hürtgen, BMW 320i)
- 1st place ETCC Independents' Championship (Duncan Huisman, BMW 320i)
- 2nd place ETCC Independents' Championship (Tom Coronel, BMW 320i)

=== 2004 ===
- 1st place DMSB Production Car Championship (DTC) Drivers and Team classification (Claudia Hürtgen, BMW 320i)

=== 2005 ===
- 1st place VLN (Claudia Hürtgen, BMW 320i)
- ADAC Procar Series (3 wins)

=== 2006 ===
- 5th place overall and class win 24h race Nürburgring (Claudia Hürtgen, Marc Hennerici, Johannes Stuck, Torsten Schubert, BMW 120d)

=== 2007 ===
- 1st place Mini Challenge Deutschland (Joakim Mangs, Mini Cooper)
- 1st place VLN Junior Trophy (Stian Sørlie, BMW 120d)
- 1st place VLN Stahlwille Cup (Claudia Hürtgen, Hans-Joachim Stuck, Johannes Stuck, BMW Z4)
- 5th place overall and class win 24h race Nürburgring (Hürtgen, Stuck, Stuck, Richard Göransson, BMW Z4)

=== 2008 ===
- 1st place Toyo Tires 24H Series (Claudia Hürtgen, Stian Sørlie, Jörg Viebahn, BMW 120d, BMW Z4)
- 15th place overall and class win 24h race Dubai (Hürtgen, Sørlie, Viebahn, BMW 120d)
- 1st place 12h race Hungary (Hürtgen, Sørlie, Viebahn, BMW Z4)
- 4th place overall and class win 12h race Hungary (Peter Posavac, Csaba Walter, Jacob Tackmann- Thomson, BMW 120d)
- 13th place and class win 24h race Nürburgring (Jörg Müller, Augusto Farfus, Fredrik Ekblom, BMW 320d)

=== 2009 ===
- 1st place 12h race Hungary (Stian Sørlie, Jörg Viebahn, Michael Outzen, BMW Z4)
- 2nd place 24h race Dubai (Abdulaziz Al Faisal, Khaled Al Faisal, Marko Hartung, Claudia Hürtgen, BMW Z4)
- 25th place and class win 24h race Nürburgring (Anders Buchardt, Nils Tronrud, Michael Aurienma, John Mayes, BMW 320d)

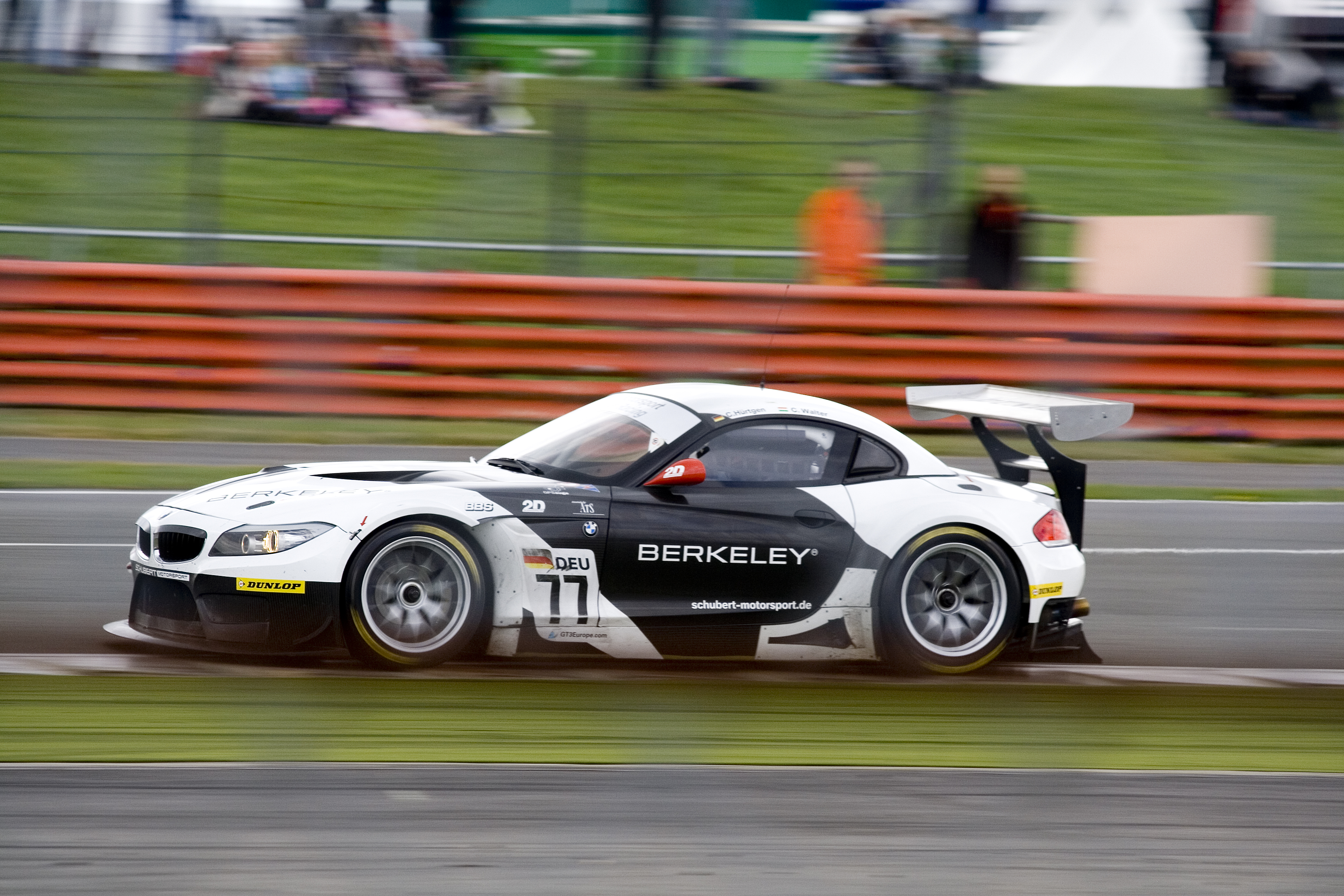
The BMW Z4 GT3 which Schubert is known for using, as Team Need for Speed.

=== 2010 ===
- FIA GT3 European Championship (3 wins)
- 3rd place FIA GT3 European Championship Team classification
- 3rd place 24h race Dubai (Abdulaziz Al Faisal, Khaled Al Faisal, Marko Hartung, Claudia Hürtgen, BMW Z4 GT3)
- 4th place 24h race Nürburgring (Hartung, Edward Sandström, Patrick Söderlund, Martin Öhlin, BMW Z4 GT3)

=== 2011 ===
- FIA GT3 European Championship (1 win)
- 2nd place FIA GT3 European Championship Team classification
- 1st place 24h race Dubai (Augusto Farfus, Edward Sandström, Tommy Milner, Claudia Hürtgen, BMW Z4 GT3)
- 1st place 24h race Barcelona (Sandström, Michael Outzen, Peter Posavac, Lars Stugemo, BMW Z4 GT3)
- 2nd place 24h race Spa-Francorchamps (Qualified 49th), (Sandström, Dirk Werner, Hürtgen, BMW Z4 GT3)

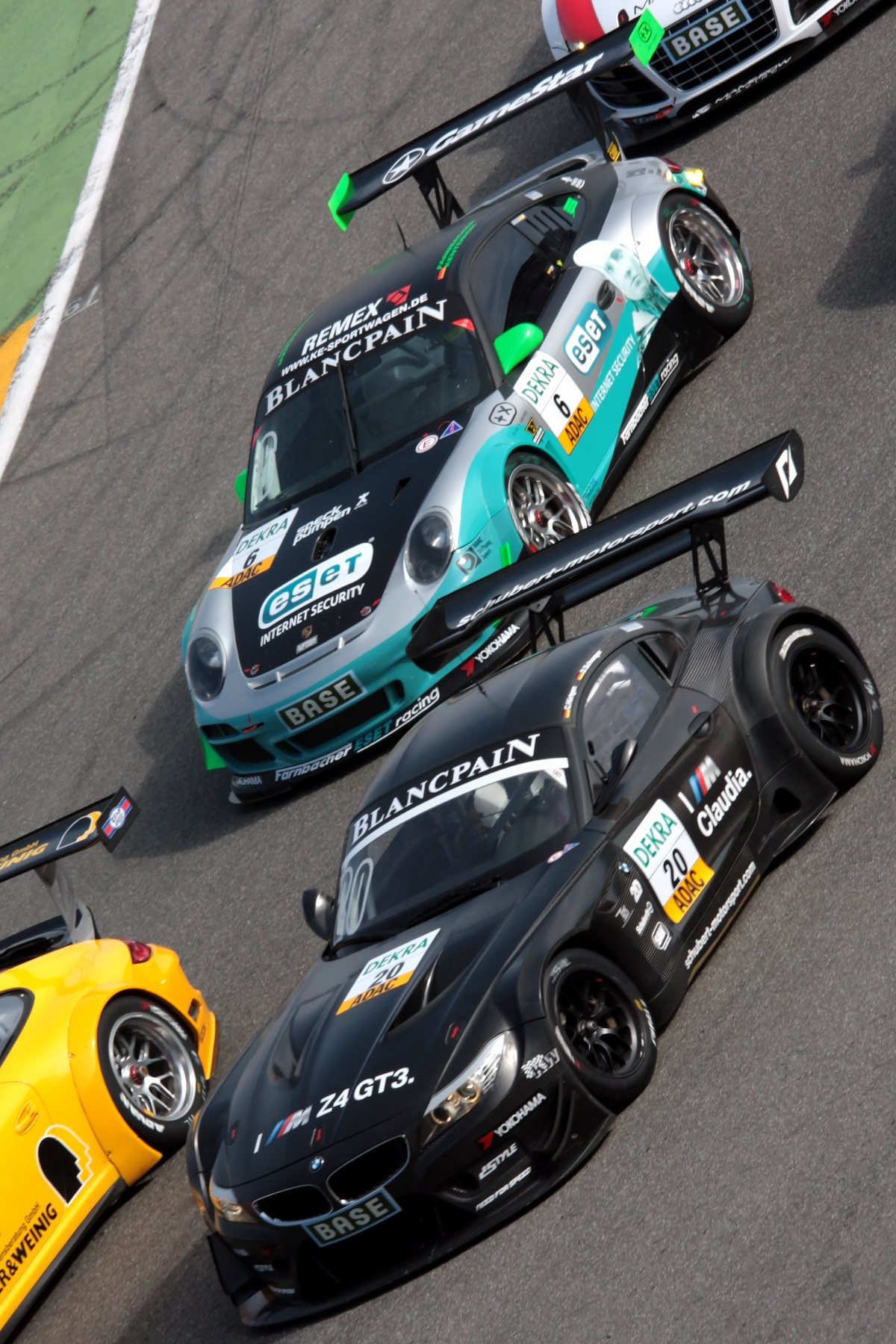
Schubert's Z4 GT3 in the ADAC GT Masters, driven by Claudia Hürtgen.

=== 2012 ===
- ADAC GT Masters (1 win)
- 4th place 24h race Dubai (Faisal Binladen, Edward Sandström, Jörg Müller, Claudia Hürtgen, Abdulaziz Al Faisal, BMW Z4 GT3)
- VLN (1 win)
- Pole position in the 24h race Nürburgring (Uwe Alzen, BMW Z4 GT3)
- 7th and 8th place 24h race Nürburgring

=== 2013 ===
- ADAC GT Masters (3 wins)
- 3rd place ADAC GT Masters Team classification
- VLN (1 win)
- 6th place 24h race Nürburgring

=== 2014 ===
- ADAC GT Masters (2 wins)
- 6th place 24h race Nürburgring

=== 2015 ===
- ADAC GT Masters (1 win)
- 2nd place ADAC GT Masters Drivers classification (Dominik Baumann, BMW Z4 GT3)
- 3rd place ADAC GT Masters Drivers classification (Jens Klingmann, BMW Z4 GT3)
- 1st place ADAC GT Masters Team classification (Baumann, Klingmann, Claudia Hürtgen, Uwe Alzen)
- 6th place 24h race Nürburgring

=== 2016 ===
- VLN (1 win)
- Recorded first-ever win for the BMW M6 GT3
- ADAC GT Masters

=== 2017 ===
- Tested the BMW M4 GT4 for BMW Motorsport
- 25th place 24h race Dubai (Qualified 49th, 5th in SPX class) (Ricky Collard, Jens Klingmann, Jörg Müller, BMW M4 GT4)
- GT4 European Series Southern Cup

=== 2018 ===
- ADAC GT Masters
- Competed as Honda customer team

=== 2019 ===
- (One-year hiatus from racing)

=== 2020 ===
- ADAC GT Masters (1 win)
- Return to GT3 racing with BMW

=== 2021 ===
- ADAC GT Masters
- 20th place 24h race Nürburgring

=== 2022 ===
- DTM (3 wins)
- 1st place DTM Drivers classification (Sheldon van der Linde, BMW M4 GT3)
- 1st place DTM Team classification (Sheldon van der Linde, Philipp Eng)
- ADAC GT Masters (2 wins)
- 38th place 24h race Dubai

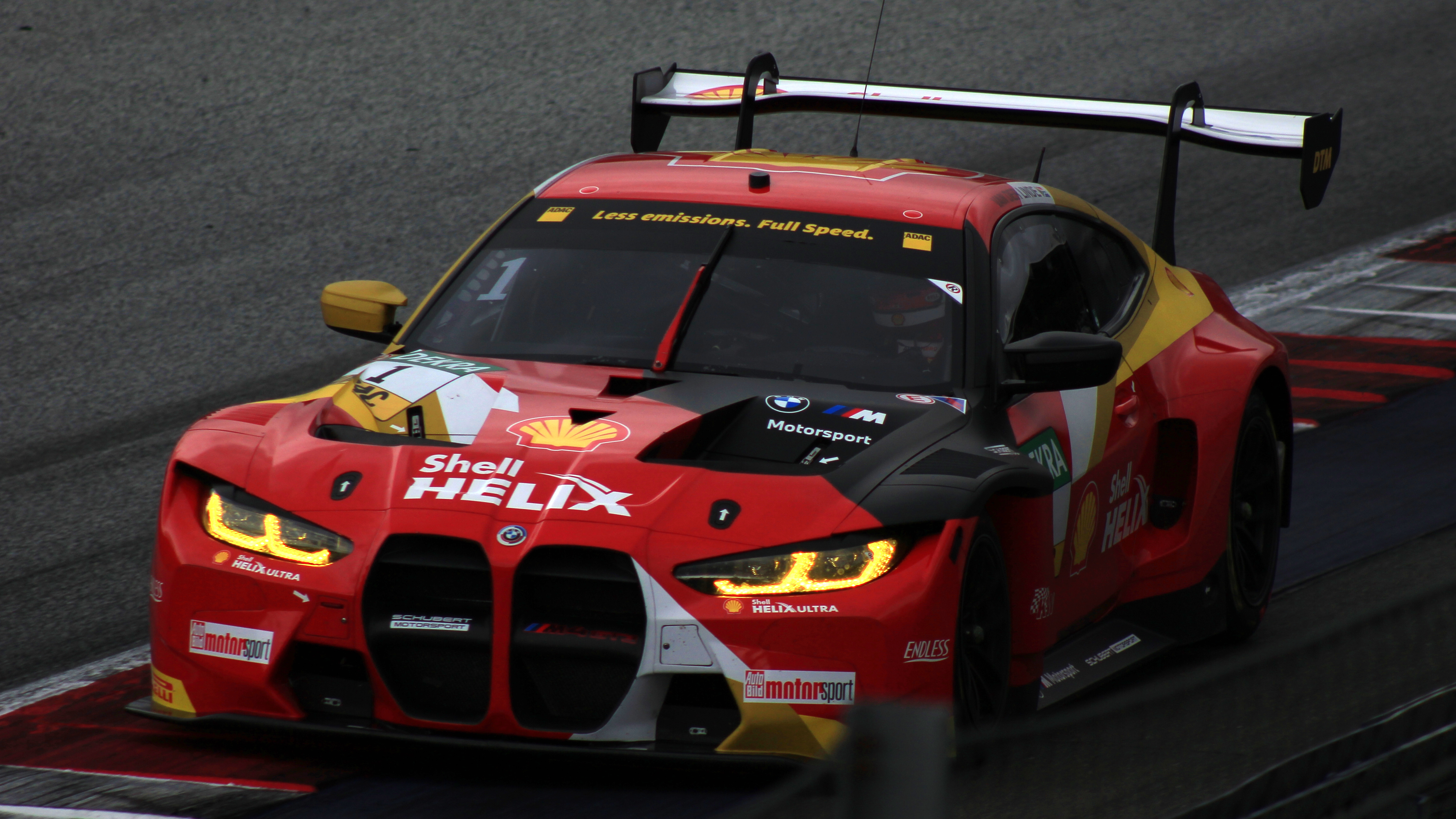
The BMW M4 GT3 with start number 1 which Sheldon van der Linde won his and Schubert Motorsport's maiden DTM titles the previous year.

=== 2023 ===
- DTM (2 wins)

=== 2024 ===
- DTM (4 wins)
- 1st place DTM Team classification (Marco Wittmann, Sheldon van der Linde, René Rast)

=== 2025 ===
- DTM (3 wins)
- ADAC GT Masters
- GT4 European Series
- 2nd place DTM Team classification (René Rast, Marco Wittmann)

=== 2026 ===
- DTM (3 wins)
- ADAC GT Masters (1 win)
- NLS (2 wins)
- GT World Challenge Asia (via collaboration with BMW M Team Studie)
- Operated the BMW M3 Touring 24H for BMW M Motorsport
- 3rd place DTM Drivers classification (Marco Wittmann, BMW M4 GT3 Evo)
- 3rd place DTM Team classification (Kelvin van der Linde, Wittmann)
- 1st place NLS Speed Trophy
- 4th place overall and class win 24h race Nürburgring (Jens Klingmann, Ugo de Wilde, Connor De Phillippi, Neil Verhagen, BMW M3 Touring 24H)
- 9th place 24h race Nürburgring (Marco Wittmann, Philipp Eng, Charles Weerts, Robin Frijns, BMW M4 GT3 Evo)

== Results ==
=== ADAC GT Masters ===
(key)

| Year | Entrant | Car | No | Driver | 1 | 2 | 3 | 4 | 5 | 6 | 7 | 8 | 9 | 10 | 11 | 12 | 13 | 14 | 15 | 16 | Pos. | Points |
|---|---|---|---|---|---|---|---|---|---|---|---|---|---|---|---|---|---|---|---|---|---|---|
| 2012 | Schubert Motorsport | BMW Z4 GT3 | 19 | (Saudi Arabia) Abdulaziz Al Faisal (Italy) Mirko Bortolotti | OSC 1 | OSC 2 | ZAN 1 | ZAN 2 | SAC 1; 25 | SAC 2; 3 | NÜR 1; 14 | NÜR 2; 16 | RBR 1 | RBR 2 | LAU 1 | LAU 2 | NÜR 1 | NÜR 2 | | | 29th | 15 |
| 2012 | Schubert Motorsport | BMW Z4 GT3 | 19 | (Germany) Max Partl (Germany) Jörg Weidinger | | | | | | | | | | | | | | | HOC 1; 23 | HOC 2; 20 | NC | 0 |
| 2012 | Schubert Motorsport | BMW Z4 GT3 | 20 | (Germany) Claudia Hürtgen (Germany) Dominik Schwager | OSC 1; 2 | OSC 2; 11 | ZAN 1; 16 | ZAN 2; 2 | SAC 1 Ret | SAC 2; 6 | NÜR 1; 6 | NÜR 2; 6 | RBR 1; 17 | RBR 2; 10 | LAU 1; 8 | LAU 2; 2 | NÜR 1; 14 | NÜR 2; 7 | HOC 1; 1 | HOC 2; 4 | 5th | 126 |
| 2013 | PIXUM Team Schubert | BMW Z4 GT3 | 19 | (Germany) Claudia Hürtgen (Austria) Dominik Baumann | OSC 1; 8 | OSC 2; 7 | SPA 1; 7 | SPA 2; 1 | SAC 1; 13 | SAC 2; 2 | NÜR 1; 11 | NÜR 2; 1 | RBR 1; 19 | RBR 2 Ret | LAU 1; 2 | LAU 2; 2 | SLO 1; 4 | SLO 2; 3 | HOC 1; 4 | HOC 2 Ret | 7th | 148 |
| 2013 | PIXUM Team Schubert | BMW Z4 GT3 | 20 | (Germany) Max Sandritter | OSC 1 DNS | OSC 2; 10 | SPA 1 Ret | SPA 2 DNS | SAC 1; 3 | SAC 2; 1 | NÜR 1; 7 | NÜR 2; 3 | RBR 1; 18 | RBR 2; 8 | LAU 1; 21 | LAU 2; 16 | SLO 1; 1 | SLO 2; 17 | HOC 1; 12 | HOC 2 DNS | 19th | 79 |
| 2013 | PIXUM Team Schubert | BMW Z4 GT3 | 20 | (Germany) Jörg Müller | OSC 1 DNS | OSC 2; 10 | SPA 1 Ret | SPA 2 DNS | | | NÜR 1; 7 | NÜR 2; 3 | RBR 1; 18 | RBR 2; 8 | LAU 1; 21 | LAU 2; 16 | | | HOC 1; 12 | HOC 2 DNS | 24th | 39 |
| 2013 | PIXUM Team Schubert | BMW Z4 GT3 | 20 | (Germany) Jens Klingmann | | | | | SAC 1; 3 | SAC 2; 1 | | | | | | | SLO 1; 1 | SLO 2; 17 | | | 23rd | 40 |
| 2014 | PIXUM Team Schubert | BMW Z4 GT3 | 19 | (Germany) Claudia Hürtgen (Austria) Dominik Baumann | OSC 1; 6 | OSC 2; 3 | ZAN 1; 4 | ZAN 2; 5 | LAU 1; 4 | LAU 2; 1 | RBR 1; 20 | RBR 2; 4 | SLO 1; 1 | SLO 2; 3 | NÜR 1; 9 | NÜR 2; 15 | SAC 1; 3 | SAC 2; 6 | HOC 1; 6 | HOC 1; 5 | 4th | 177 |
| 2014 | PIXUM Team Schubert | BMW Z4 GT3 | 20 | (Germany) Jens Klingmann (Germany) Max Sandritter | OSC 1; 20 | OSC 2 Ret | ZAN 1; 7 | ZAN 2; 7 | LAU 1 Ret | LAU 2; 6 | RBR 1; 5 | RBR 2; 5 | SLO 1; 2 | SLO 2; 17 | NÜR 1; 12 | NÜR 2; 5 | SAC 1 Ret | SAC 2; 5 | HOC 1; 4 | HOC 1; 17 | 9th | 92 |
| 2015 | BMW Sports Trophy Team Schubert | BMW Z4 GT3 | 9 | (Germany) Claudia Hürtgen | OSC 1; 6 | OSC 2; 5 | RBR 1; 8 | RBR 2; 9 | SPA 1; 5 | SPA 2; 6 | LAU 1; 3 | LAU 2; 8 | NÜR 1; 6 | NÜR 2 Ret | SAC 1; 2 | SAC 2; 14 | ZAN 1; 13 | ZAN 2 Ret | HOC 1 Ret | HOC 2 DNS | 11th | 91 |
| 2015 | BMW Sports Trophy Team Schubert | BMW Z4 GT3 | 9 | (Finland) Jesse Krohn | OSC 1; 6 | OSC 2; 5 | | | | | | | | | | | | | | | 29th | 18 |
| 2015 | BMW Sports Trophy Team Schubert | BMW Z4 GT3 | 9 | (Germany) Uwe Alzen | | | RBR 1; 8 | RBR 2; 9 | SPA 1; 5 | SPA 2; 6 | LAU 1; 3 | LAU 2; 8 | NÜR 1; 6 | NÜR 2 Ret | SAC 1; 2 | SAC 2; 14 | ZAN 1; 13 | ZAN 2 Ret | | | 15th | 73 |
| 2015 | BMW Sports Trophy Team Schubert | BMW Z4 GT3 | 9 | (Germany) Niklas Mackschin | | | | | | | | | | | | | | | HOC 1 Ret | HOC 2 DNS | NC | 0 |
| 2015 | BMW Sports Trophy Team Schubert | BMW Z4 GT3 | 80 | (Austria) Dominik Baumann | OSC 1; 5 | OSC 2; 7 | RBR 1 Ret | RBR 2 Ret | SPA 1; 1 | SPA 2; 5 | LAU 1; 1 | LAU 2; 4 | NÜR 1; 12 | NÜR 2; 4 | SAC 1; 1 | SAC 2; 8 | ZAN 1; 10 | ZAN 2; 1 | HOC 1; 4 | HOC 2; 3 | 2nd | 186 |
| 2015 | BMW Sports Trophy Team Schubert | BMW Z4 GT3 | 80 | (Germany) Jens Klingmann | OSC 1; 5 | OSC 2; 7 | RBR 1 Ret | RBR 2 Ret | SPA 1; 1 | SPA 2; 5 | LAU 1; 1 | LAU 2; 4 | NÜR 1; 12 | NÜR 2; 4 | SAC 1; 1 | SAC 2; 8 | ZAN 1; 10 | ZAN 2; 1 | | | 3rd | 156 |
| 2015 | BMW Sports Trophy Team Schubert | BMW Z4 GT3 | 80 | (Canada) Bruno Spengler | | | | | | | | | | | | | | | HOC 1; 4 | HOC 2; 3 | 25th | 30 |
| 2018 | Honda Team Schubert | Honda NSX GT3 | 9 | (Germany) Christopher Dreyspring (Switzerland) Giorgio Maggi | OSC 1 Ret | OSC 2; 24 | MST 1; 24 | MST; 2 DSQ | RBR 1; 17 | RBR 2; 26 | NÜR 1; 6 | NÜR 2; 23 | ZAN 1; 16 | ZAN 2; 22 | SAC 1; 25 | SAC 2; 17 | HOC 1 Ret | HOC 2; 23 | | | 34th | 8 |
| 2018 | Honda Team Schubert | Honda NSX GT3 | 10 | (Switzerland) Philipp Frommenwiler (Argentina) Esteban Guerrieri | OSC 1 | OSC 2 | MST 1 | MST 2 | RBR 1; 28 | RBR 2; 22 | NÜR 1 | NÜR 2 | ZAN 1 | ZAN 2 | SAC 1 | SAC 2 | HOC 1 | HOC 2 | | | NC | 0 |
| 2020 | Schubert Motorsport | BMW M6 GT3 | 9 | (Sweden) Joel Eriksson (Australia) Aidan Read | LAU 1; 27 | LAU 2; 25 | NÜR 1; 24 | NÜR 2; 19 | HOC 1; 22 | HOC 2; 15 | SAC 1; 30† | SAC 2; 15 | RBR 1; 11 | RBR 2 Ret | LAU 1; 19 | LAU 2; 24 | OSC 1; 19 | OSC 2; 24 | | | 37th | 8 |
| 2020 | Schubert Motorsport | BMW M6 GT3 | 10 | (Sweden) Henric Skoog | LAU 1; 23 | LAU 2 Ret | NÜR 1; 27 | NÜR 2; 21 | HOC 1; 15 | HOC 2; 22 | SAC 1; 20 | SAC 2; 7 | RBR 1; 1 | RBR 2; 5 | LAU 1; 18 | LAU 2; 10 | OSC 1 Ret | OSC 2; 12 | | | 18th | 56 |
| 2020 | Schubert Motorsport | BMW M6 GT3 | 10 | (United Kingdom) Nick Yelloly | LAU 1; 23 | LAU 2 Ret | NÜR 1; 27 | NÜR 2; 21 | HOC 1; 15 | HOC 2; 22 | | | RBR 1; 1 | RBR 2; 5 | | | OSC 1 Ret | OSC 2; 12 | | | 22nd | 41 |
| 2020 | Schubert Motorsport | BMW M6 GT3 | 10 | (Finland) Jesse Krohn | | | | | | | SAC 1; 20 | SAC 2; 7 | | | | | | | | | 36th | 9 |
| 2020 | Schubert Motorsport | BMW M6 GT3 | 10 | (South Africa) Sheldon van der Linde | | | | | | | | | | | LAU 1; 18 | LAU 2; 10 | | | | | 39th | 6 |
| 2021 | Schubert Motorsport | BMW M6 GT3 | 10 | (Finland) Jesse Krohn (United Kingdom) Nick Yelloly | OSC 1; 4 | OSC 2; 2 | RBR 1 Ret | RBR 2; 3 | ZAN 1; 3 | ZAN 2 Ret | LAU 1; 7 | LAU 2; 11 | SAC 1; 10 | SAC; 2 DSQ | HOC 1; 22 | HOC 1 Ret | NÜR 1; 9 | NÜR 2; 8 | | | 8th | 104 |
| 2022 | Schubert Motorsport | BMW M4 GT3 | 10 | (United Kingdom) Ben Green | OSC 1; 10 | OSC 2; 16 | RBR 1; 1^{3} | RBR 2; 1^{1} | ZAN 1; 18† | ZAN 2; 11 | NÜR 1; 10 | NÜR 2; 11^{2} | LAU 1; 11 | LAU 2; 9 | SAC 1; 13 | SAC 2; 8 | HOC 1; 7 | HOC 1; 9 | | | 7th | 118 |
| 2022 | Schubert Motorsport | BMW M4 GT3 | 10 | (Germany) Niklas Krütten | OSC 1; 10 | OSC 2; 16 | RBR 1; 1^{3} | RBR 2; 1^{1} | ZAN 1; 18† | ZAN 2; 11 | NÜR 1; 10 | NÜR 2; 11^{2} | LAU 1; 11 | LAU 2; 9 | | | HOC 1; 7 | HOC 1; 9 | | | 9th | 107 |
| 2022 | Schubert Motorsport | BMW M4 GT3 | 10 | (Finland) Jesse Krohn | | | | | | | | | | | SAC 1; 13 | SAC 2; 8 | | | | | 16th | 91 |
| 2022 | Schubert Motorsport | BMW M4 GT3 | 20 | (Finland) Jesse Krohn | OSC 1; 7 | OSC 2; 4 | RBR 1; 5 | RBR 2; 2^{2} | ZAN 1; 19† | ZAN 2 Ret | NÜR 1 Ret | NÜR 2; 9 | LAU 1; 12 | LAU 2 Ret^{1} | | | HOC 1 Ret | HOC 1; 6 | | | 16th | 91 |
| 2022 | Schubert Motorsport | BMW M4 GT3 | 20 | (Netherlands) Nicky Catsburg | OSC 1; 7 | OSC 2; 4 | RBR 1; 5 | RBR 2; 2^{2} | ZAN 1; 19† | ZAN 2 Ret | NÜR 1 Ret | NÜR 2; 9 | LAU 1; 12 | LAU 2 Ret^{1} | SAC 1 | SAC 2 | HOC 1 Ret | HOC 1; 6 | | | 18th | 80 |
| 2023 | Schubert Motorsport | BMW M4 GT3 | 20 | (Philippines) Eduardo Coseteng (United Kingdom) Ben Green | HOC; 1; 2 | HOC; 2; 4 | NOR; 1; 9 | NOR; 2; 9 | NÜR; 1; 8 | NÜR; 2; 6^{2} | SAC; 1; 2 | SAC; 2; 4 | RBR; 1; 2 | RBR; 2; 9 | HOC; 1; 7 | HOC; 2 Ret | | | | | 7th | 136 |
| 2025 | Schubert Motorsport | BMW M4 GT3 Evo | 56 | (Germany) Juliano Holzem (Germany) Sandro Holzem | LAU; 1; 10 | LAU; 2; 9 | ZAN; 1; 3 | ZAN; 2; 11 | NÜR; 1; 6^{3} | NÜR; 2; 11^{3} | SAL; 1; 3 | SAL; 2; 4 | RBR; 1; 4^{2} | RBR; 2; 2 | HOC; 1; 8^{2} | HOC; 2; 5 | | | | | 5th | 143 |
| 2026 | Schubert Motorsport | BMW M4 GT3 Evo | 56 | (Germany) Juliano Holzem (Germany) Sandro Holzem | RBR; 1; 11 | RBR; 2; 7 | ZAN; 1; 2^{1} | ZAN; 2; 9 | LAU; 1; 1^{2} | LAU; 2; 9 | NÜR; 1; 4 | NÜR; 2; 12 | SAL; 1; 5 | SAL; 2; 10 | HOC; 1; 8 | HOC; 2; 9 | | | | | 4th | 132 |

=== Deutsche Tourenwagen Masters ===
| Year | Car | Drivers | Races | Wins | Poles | F/Laps | Podiums | Points | D.C. | T.C. |
|---|---|---|---|---|---|---|---|---|---|---|
| 2022 | BMW M4 GT3 | (South Africa) Sheldon van der Linde | 16 | 3 | 2 | 2 | 6 | 164 | 1st | 1st |
| 2022 | BMW M4 GT3 | (Austria) Philipp Eng | 16 | 0 | 0 | 0 | 0 | 64 | 14th | 1st |
| 2023 | BMW M4 GT3 | (South Africa) Sheldon van der Linde | 16 | 1 | 1 | 2 | 4 | 151 | 4th | 4th |
| 2023 | BMW M4 GT3 | (Germany) René Rast | 14 | 1 | 2 | 1 | 4 | 140 | 5th | 4th |
| 2023 | BMW M4 GT3 | (Belgium) Dries Vanthoor | 2 | 0 | 0 | 0 | 0 | 7 | 29th | 4th |
| 2024 | BMW M4 GT3 | (Germany) René Rast | 16 | 2 | 0 | 0 | 4 | 172 | 4th | 1st |
| 2024 | BMW M4 GT3 | (South Africa) Sheldon van der Linde | 16 | 1 | 0 | 0 | 1 | 142 | 6th | 1st |
| 2024 | BMW M4 GT3 | (Germany) Marco Wittmann | 16 | 1 | 0 | 0 | 2 | 110 | 12th | 1st |
| 2025 | BMW M4 GT3 EVO | (Germany) Marco Wittmann | 16 | 0 | 1 | 0 | 4 | 170 | 5th | 2nd |
| 2025 | BMW M4 GT3 EVO | (Germany) René Rast | 16 | 3 | 1 | 3 | 4 | 169 | 6th | 2nd |
| 2026 | BMW M4 GT3 EVO | (Germany) Marco Wittmann | 16 | 2 | 1 | 0 | 7 | 198 | 3rd | 3rd |
| 2026 | BMW M4 GT3 EVO | (South Africa) Kelvin van der Linde | 16 | 1 | 2 | 0 | 1 | 96 | 14th | 3rd |

=== Nürburgring Langstrecken-Serie (BFGLM/VLN) ===
| Year | Entrant | No | Car | Drivers | Class | 1 | 2 | 3 | 4 | 5 | 6 | 7 | 8 | 9 | 10 |
|---|---|---|---|---|---|---|---|---|---|---|---|---|---|---|---|
| 2010 | Need for Speed by Schubert Motorsport | 91 | BMW Z4 GT3 | (Norway) Anders Buchart (Norway) Nils Tronrud (United States) John Mayes (Sweden) Lars Stugemo | SP9 | | | | | | | VLN 7 NC | VLN 8; 30; PIC: 12 | VLN 9; 22; PIC: 9 | |
| 2010 | Need for Speed by Schubert Motorsport | 92 | BMW Z4 GT3 | (Sweden) Patrick Söderlund (Sweden) Edward Sandström (Sweden) Martin Öhlin (Sweden) Lars Stugemo | SP9 | | VLN 2 NC | | | | | | | | |
| 2010 | Need for Speed by Schubert Motorsport | 92 | BMW Z4 GT3 | (Germany) Marko Hartung (Germany) Jörg Viebahn (Germany) Claudia Hürtgen (Hungary) Csaba Walter | SP9 | | | | | | | VLN 7 NC | | | VLN 10; NC |
| 2010 | Need for Speed by Schubert Motorsport | 460 | BMW 320d | (United States) Michael Auriemma (United States) John Edwards (United States) Mike Edwards (Norway) Stian Sörlie (Sweden) Fredrik Larsson (Germany) Torsten Schubert | VD1T | | | | | | | VLN 7; 29; PIC: 1 | | VLN 9; 11; PIC: 1 | VLN 10; NC |
| 2011 | Need for Speed Team Schubert | 6 | BMW Z4 GT3 | (Sweden) Edward Sandström (Sweden) Fredrik Larsson (Germany) Claudia Hürtgen | SP9 | | | | VLN 4 NC | | | | | | |
| 2011 | Need for Speed Team Schubert | 6 | BMW Z4 GT3 | (Portugal) Pedro Lamy (Germany) Marko Hartung | SP9 | | | | | | | VLN 7; 7 PIC: 3 | | | |
| 2011 | Need for Speed Team Schubert | 16 | BMW Z4 GT3 | (Germany) Marko Hartung (Germany) Jörg Viebahn (United States) Tommy Milner (Netherlands) Tom Coronel | SP9 | | | VLN 3 NC | VLN 4 NC | | | | | | |
| 2011 | Need for Speed Team Schubert | 26 | BMW Z4 GT3 | (Norway) Anders Buchart (Norway) Nils Tronrud (United States) John Mayes (Germany) Jörg Viebahn (Germany) Peter Posavac | SP9 | | | VLN 3; 7 PIC: 3 | VLN 4 NC | | | | | | |
| 2011 | Need for Speed Team Schubert | 555 | BMW 320d | (United States) Tommy Milner (Germany) Torsten Schubert (Sweden) Edward Sandström (Sweden) Fredrik Larsson | VD1T | VLN 1; 25; PIC: 1 | | VLN 3; 26; PIC: 1 | | | | VLN 7; 29; PIC: 1 | | VLN 9; 11; PIC: 1 | VLN 10; NC |
| 2012 | BMW Team Schubert | 19 | BMW Z4 GT3 | (Germany) Jörg Müller (Germany) Dirk Müller (Germany) Dirk Adorf | SP9 | VLN 1; 1 PIC: 1 | | | | | | | | | |
| 2012 | BMW Team Schubert | 19 | BMW Z4 GT3 | (Germany) Uwe Alzen (Germany) Nico Bastian | SP9 | | VLN 2; 3 PIC: 3 | | | | | | | | |
| 2012 | BMW Team Schubert | 20 | BMW Z4 GT3 | (Germany) Claudia Hürtgen (Germany) Dominik Schwager (Germany) Dirk Adorf | SP9 | | VLN 2; 2 PIC: 2 | | | | | | | | |
| 2012 | BMW Team Schubert | 20 | BMW Z4 GT3 | (Germany) Claudia Hürtgen (Saudi Arabia) Abdulaziz Al Falsal (Germany) Klaus Abbelen | SP9 | | | | | VLN 5 NC | | | | | |
| 2012 | BMW Team Schubert | 20 | BMW Z4 GT3 | (Germany) Claudia Hürtgen (Germany) Peter Posavac (Norway) Anders Buchardt | SP9 | | | | | | | VLN 7 NC | | | |
| 2012 | Schubert Motors GmbH | 600 | BMW 320d | (Germany) Torsten Schubert (Norway) Nils Tronrud | VD1T | | | | | | | VLN 7; 34; PIC: 1 | | | |
| 2013 | BMW Team Schubert | 19 | BMW Z4 GT3 | (Germany) Jörg Müller (Germany) Dirk Müller (Brazil) Augusto Farfus | SP9 | VLN 1; 1 PIC: 1 | VLN 2; 8 PIC: 8 | | | | | | | | |
| 2013 | BMW Team Schubert | 20 | BMW Z4 GT3 | (Germany) Claudia Hürtgen (Germany) Martin Tomczyk (Germany) Jens Klingmann (Germany) Dirk Adorf | SP9 | VLN 1; 3 PIC: 3 | VLN 2; 2 PIC: 2 | | | | | | | | |
| 2013 | PIXUM Team Schubert | 20 | BMW Z4 GT3 | (Saudi Arabia) Abdulaziz Al Falsal (Germany) Max Sandritter (Austria) Dominik Baumann | SP9 | | | | VLN 4; 2 PIC: 2 | VLN 5; 6 PIC: 5 | | | | | |
| 2013 | PIXUM Team Schubert | 126 | BMW Z4 GTS | (Germany) Peter Posavac (Norway) Anders Buchart (Austria) Dominik Baumann | SP8 | | | | | | | | VLN 8 NC | | |
| 2014 | BMW Sports Trophy Team Schubert | 19 | BMW Z4 GT3 | (Germany) Dirk Werner (Germany) Dirk Müller (Germany) Lucas Luhr (United Kingdom) Alexander Sims | SP9 | VLN 1; 5 PIC: 5 | VLN 2; 10; PIC: 9 | | VLN 4; 19; PIC: 18 | | | | | | |
| 2014 | BMW Sports Trophy Team Schubert | 20 | BMW Z4 GT3 | (Germany) Jens Klingmann (Austria) Dominik Baumann (Germany) Martin Tomczyk (Germany) Claudia Hürtgen (Germany) Max Sandritter (Austria) Thomas Jäger | SP9 | VLN 1; 6 PIC: 6 | VLN 2; 6 PIC: 5 | | VLN 4; 4 PIC: 4 | | VLN 6; 2 PIC: 2 | | | | |
| 2015 | BMW Sports Trophy Team Schubert | 19 | BMW Z4 GT3 | (Germany) Dirk Werner (United Kingdom) Alexander Sims (Germany) Marco Wittmann | SP9 | VLN 1; 7 PIC: 7 | | | | | | | | | |
| 2015 | BMW Sports Trophy Team Schubert | 20 | BMW Z4 GT3 | (Germany) Jens Klingmann (Austria) Dominik Baumann (Germany) Claudia Hürtgen (Germany) Max Sandritter | SP9 | VLN 1; 28; PIC: 21 | | | | VLN 5; 4 PIC: 2 | | | | | |
| 2016 | Schubert Motorsport | 31 | BMW M6 GT3 | (Germany) Jörg Müller (Brazil) Augusto Farfus (Finland) Jesse Krohn | SP9 | VLN 1; 22; PIC: 18 | | | | | | | | | |
| 2016 | Schubert Motorsport | 31 | BMW M6 GT3 | (Germany) Jörg Müller (Germany) Marco Wittmann (Finland) Jesse Krohn | SP9 | | | VLN 3; 1 PIC: 1 | | | | | | | |
| 2016 | Schubert Motorsport | 32 | BMW M6 GT3 | (Germany) Jens Klingmann (Germany) Lucas Luhr (United States) John Edwards | SP9 | VLN 1 NC | | | | | | | | | |
| 2016 | Schubert Motorsport | 39 | BMW M6 GT3 | (Germany) Lucas Luhr (United States) John Edwards (Germany) Martin Tomczyk | SP9 | | | VLN 3; 2 PIC: 2 | | | | | | | |

=== 24 Hours of Nürburgring ===
| Year | Team | No. | Car | Drivers | Class | Laps | Pos. | Class Pos. |
|---|---|---|---|---|---|---|---|---|
| 2005 | (Germany) Motopark Arena Oschersleben | 132 | BMW 320i | (Germany) Claudia Hürtgen (Sweden) Thed Björk (Sweden) Richard Göransson (Germany) Torsten Schubert | A3 | 123 | 15th | 2nd |
| 2005 | (Germany) Motopark Arena Oschersleben | 133 | BMW 320i | (Germany) Claudia Hürtgen (Germany) Ralph Bohnhorst (Germany) Marc Hennerici (Germany) Torsten Schubert | A3 | 125 | 11th | 1st |
| 2006 | (Germany) Motorsport Arena Oschersleben | 68 | BMW Z3 M Coupé | (Germany) Peter Posavac (Germany) Jürgen Steiner (Germany) Christian Feineis (Germany) Thomas Neumann | SP6 | 112 | 85th | 11th |
| 2006 | (Germany) Motorsport Arena Oschersleben | 263 | BMW 120d | (Germany) Claudia Hürtgen (Germany) Marc Hennerici (Austria) Johannes Stuck (Germany) Torsten Schubert | S1 | 138 | 5th | 1st |
| 2006 | (Germany) Motorsport Arena Oschersleben | 264 | BMW 120d | (Germany) Reinhard Huber (Germany) Guido Thierfelder (Germany) Jochen Übler (Germany) Claudia Hürtgen | S1 | 24 | DNF | DNF |
| 2007 | (Germany) Motorsport Arena Oschersleben | 50 | BMW Z4 M Coupé | (Germany) Claudia Hürtgen (Germany) Hans-Joachim Stuck (Austria) Johannes Stuck (Sweden) Richard Göransson | SP6 | 106 | 5th | 1st |
| 2007 | (Germany) Motorsport Arena Oschersleben | 261 | BMW 120d | (United States) Michael Auriemma (United States) John Mayes (United States) Jimmy Locke (Germany) Marc Bronzel | S1 | 94 | 37th | 2nd |
| 2007 | (Germany) Motorsport Arena Oschersleben | 262 | BMW 120d | (Norway) Nils Tronrud (Norway) Anders Burchardt (Sweden) Arne Berg | S1 | 63 | 148th | 14th |
| 2007 | (Germany) Motorsport Arena Oschersleben | 263 | BMW 120d | (Germany) Claudia Hürtgen (Germany) Marc Hennerici (Austria) Johannes Stuck (Germany) Torsten Schubert | S1 | 138 | 27th | 1st |
| 2008 | (Germany) Motorsport Arena Oschersleben | 5 | BMW Z4 M Coupé | (Germany) Claudia Hürtgen (Norway) Stian Sörlie (Germany) Jörg Viebahn (Sweden) Richard Göransson | SP6 | 53 | 183rd | 14th |
| 2008 | (Germany) Motorsport Arena Oschersleben | 261 | BMW 320d | (Germany) Jörg Müller (Brazil) Augusto Farfus (Sweden) Fredrik Ekblom (Norway) Stian Sörlie | S1 | 137 | 13th | 1st |
| 2008 | (Germany) Motorsport Arena Oschersleben | 262 | BMW 320d | (Norway) Nils Tronrud (Norway) Anders Burchardt (United States) Michael Auriemma (United States) John Mayes | S1 | 134 | 22nd | 2nd |
| 2008 | (Germany) Motorsport Arena Oschersleben | 263 | BMW 120d | (Germany) Peter Posavac (Germany) Marc Bronzel (Germany) Alfred Backer (Germany) Andreas Winkler | S1 | 58 | 178th | 13th |
| 2008 | (Germany) Motorsport Arena Oschersleben | 264 | BMW 120d | (Turkey) Emin Akata (Germany) Jürgen Dinstühler (Germany) Niclas Königsbauer (United States) Jimmy Locke | V5 | 125 | 51st | 1st |
| 2009 | (Germany) Motorsport Arena Oschersleben | 60 | BMW M3 GT4 | (Germany) Jörg Müller (United Kingdom) Andy Priaulx (Germany) Jochen Übler (Germany) Marcus Schurig | SP10 GT4 | 129 | 47th | 3rd |
| 2009 | (Germany) Motorsport Arena Oschersleben | 77 | BMW Z4 M Coupé | (Germany) Claudia Hürtgen (Brazil) Augusto Farfus (Norway) Stian Sörlie (Germany) Dirk Müller | SP6 | 38 | DNF | DNF |
| 2009 | (Germany) Motorsport Arena Oschersleben | 138 | BMW 320d E90 | (Germany) Emin Akata (Germany) Jürgen Dinstühler (Germany) Andread Winkler (Germany) Torsten Schubert | D1T | 135 | 28th | 2nd |
| 2009 | (Germany) Motorsport Arena Oschersleben | 139 | BMW 320d E90 | (Germany) Peter Posavac (Sweden) Lars Stugemo (Germany) Marko Hartung (United Kingdom) Paul Spooner | D1T | 53 | DNF | DNF |
| 2009 | (Germany) Motorsport Arena Oschersleben | 140 | BMW 320d E90 | (Norway) Anders Buchardt (Norway) Nils Tronrud (United States) Michael Aurienma (United States) John Mayes | D1T | 136 | 25th | 1st |
| 2010 | (Germany) Need for Speed by Schubert Motorsport | 76 | BMW Z4 GT3 | (Germany) Marko Hartung (Sweden) Patrick Söderlund (Sweden) Edward Sandström (Sweden) Martin Öhlin | SP9 GT3 | 152 | 4th | 2nd |
| 2010 | (Germany) Schubert Motorsport | 75 | BMW 320d E90 | (Norway) Anders Buchardt (Norway) Nils Tronrud (Sweden) Lars Stugemo (Sweden) Magnus Öhman | D1T | 114 | 97th | 5th |
| 2010 | (Germany) Schubert Motorsport | 77 | BMW Z4 GT3 | (Germany) Claudia Hürtgen (Norway) Stian Sörlie (Germany) Jörg Viebahn (Sweden) Richard Göransson | SP9 GT3 | 12 | DNF | DNF |
| 2011 | (Germany) Need for Speed Team Schubert | 4 | BMW Z4 GT3 | (Germany) Marko Hartung (Germany) Jörg Viebahn (Netherlands) Tom Coronel (Germany) Claudia Hürtgen | SP9 GT3 | 114 | DNF | DNF |
| 2011 | (Germany) Need for Speed Team Schubert | 76 | BMW Z4 GT3 | (Sweden) Edward Sandström (United States) Tommy Milner (Sweden) Fredrik Larsson (Germany) Claudia Hürtgen | SP9 GT3 | 61 | DNF | DNF |
| 2011 | (Germany) Need for Speed Team Schubert | 77 | BMW Z4 GT3 | (Norway) Anders Buchardt (Germany) Peter Posavac (United States) John Mayes (Norway) Stian Sörlie | SP9 GT3 | 94 | DNF | DNF |
| 2012 | (Germany) BMW Team Schubert | 19 | BMW Z4 GT3 | (Germany) Jörg Müller (Germany) Dirk Müller (Germany) Uwe Alzen (Germany) Dirk Adorf | SP9 GT3 | 150 | 7th | 7th |
| 2012 | (Germany) BMW Team Schubert | 20 | BMW Z4 GT3 | (Germany) Dirk Adorf (Germany) Dominik Schwager (Germany) Claudia Hürtgen (Germany) Nico Bastian | SP9 GT3 | 150 | 8th | 8th |
| 2013 | (Germany) BMW Team Schubert | 19 | BMW Z4 GT3 | (Brazil) Augusto Farfus (Germany) Uwe Alzen (Germany) Jörg Müller (Germany) Claudia Hürtgen | SP9 GT3 | 8 | DNF | DNF |
| 2013 | (Germany) BMW Team Schubert | 20 | BMW Z4 GT3 | (Germany) Dirk Adorf (Germany) Claudia Hürtgen (Germany) Jens Klingmann (Germany) Martin Tomczyk | SP9 GT3 | 87 | 6th | 6th |
| 2014 | (Germany) BMW Sports Trophy Team Schubert | 19 | BMW Z4 GT3 | (Germany) Dirk Werner (Germany) Dirk Müller (Germany) Lucas Luhr (United Kingdom) Alexander Sims | SP9 GT3 | 20 | DNF | DNF |
| 2014 | (Germany) BMW Sports Trophy Team Schubert | 20 | BMW Z4 GT3 | (Germany) Jens Klingmann (Austria) Dominik Baumann (Germany) Claudia Hürtgen (Germany) Martin Tomczyk | SP9 GT3 | 157 | 6th | 6th |
| 2015 | (Germany) BMW Sports Trophy Team Schubert | 19 | BMW Z4 GT3 | (Germany) Dirk Werner (Germany) Marco Wittmann (United Kingdom) Alexander Sims (Germany) Dirk Müller | SP9 GT3 | 47 | DNF | DNF |
| 2015 | (Germany) BMW Sports Trophy Team Schubert | 20 | BMW Z4 GT3 | (Austria) Dominik Baumann (Germany) Jens Klingmann (Germany) Claudia Hürtgen (Germany) Martin Tomczyk | SP9 GT3 | 23 | DNF | DNF |
| 2016 | (Germany) Schubert Motorsport | 18 | BMW M6 GT3 | (Brazil) Augusto Farfus (Finland) Jesse Krohn (Germany) Jörg Müller (Germany) Marco Wittmann | SP9 GT3 | 60 | DNF | DNF |
| 2016 | (Germany) Schubert Motorsport | 100 | BMW M6 GT3 | (United States) John Edwards (Germany) Jens Klingmann (Germany) Lucas Luhr (Germany) Martin Tomczyk | SP9 GT3 | 93 | DNF | DNF |
| 2017 | (Germany) Schubert Motorsport | 19 | BMW M6 GT3 | (Germany) Jens Klingmann (United States) John Edwards (United Kingdom) Tom Onslow-Cole | SP9 | 157 | 11th | 11th |
| 2017 | (Germany) Schubert Motorsport | 20 | BMW M6 GT3 | (Finland) Jesse Krohn (Germany) Jörg Müller (Canada) Bruno Spengler (Canada) Kuno Wittmer | SP9 | 157 | 12th | 12th |
| 2019 | (Germany) Schubert Motorsport | 40 | BMW M2 Competition | (Germany) Christopher Dreyspring (Netherlands) Ricardo van der Ende (Germany) Christopher Brück | SP8T | 40 | DNF | DNF |
| 2021 | (Germany) Schubert Motorsport | 20 | BMW M6 GT3 | (Netherlands) Stef Dusseldorp (Germany) Jens Klingmann (Finland) Jesse Krohn (United Kingdom) Alexander Sims | SP9 | 59 | 6th | 6th |
| 2021 | (Germany) Schubert Motorsport | 890 | BMW M2 ClubSport Racing | (Germany) Cristopher Dreyspring (Germany) Marcel Lenerz (Germany) Torsten Schubert (Germany) Michael von Zabiensky | Cup 5 | 47 | 68th | 3rd |
| 2022 | (Germany) Schubert Motorsport | 20 | BMW M4 GT3 | (Germany) Jens Klingmann (Finland) Jesse Krohn (Germany) Niklas Krütten (United Kingdom) Alexander Sims | SP9 Pro | 153 | DNF | DNF |
| 2022 | (Germany) Schubert Motorsport | 880 | BMW M2 ClubSport Racing | (Japan) Takayuki Kinoshita (Germany) Torsten Schubert (Germany) Stefan von Zabiensky (Germany) Michael von Zabiensky | Cup5 | 132 | 48th | 1st |
| 2026 | (Germany) Schubert Motorsport | 77 | BMW M4 GT3 Evo | (Germany) Marco Wittmann (Austria) Philipp Eng (Belgium) Charles Weerts (Netherlands) Robin Frijns | SP9 Pro | 154 | 9th | 8th |
| 2026 | (Germany) BMW M Motorsport | 81 | BMW M3 Touring 24H | (Germany) Jens Klingmann (Belgium) Ugo de Wilde (United States) Connor De Phillippi (United States) Neil Verhagen | SPX | 156 | 4th | 1st |

=== 24 Hours of Spa ===
| Year | Team | No. | Car | Drivers | Class | Laps | Pos. | Class Pos. |
|---|---|---|---|---|---|---|---|---|
| 2011 | (Germany) Need for Speed Team Schubert | 76 | BMW Z4 GT3 | (Sweden) Edward Sandström (Germany) Dirk Werner (Germany) Claudia Hürtgen | GT3 Pro | 123 | 2nd | 2nd |

=== Dubai 24 Hour ===
| Year | Team | No. | Car | Drivers | Class | Laps | Pos. | Class Pos. |
|---|---|---|---|---|---|---|---|---|
| 2011 | (Germany) Need for Speed Team Schubert | 76 | BMW Z4 GT3 | (Brazil) Augusto Farfus (Sweden) Edward Sandström (United States) Tommy Milner (Germany) Claudia Hürtgen | A6 | 594 | 1st | 1st |
| 2011 | (Germany) Need for Speed Team Schubert | 77 | BMW Z4 GT3 | (Canada) Paul Dalla Lana (United States) Boris Said (United States) Bill Auberlen (United States) Matt Plumb | A6 | 579 | 5th | 5th |
| 2012 | (Saudi Arabia) Saudi Falcons by Schubert | 1 | BMW Z4 GT3 | (Saudi Arabia) Abdulaziz Al Faisal (Saudi Arabia) Faisal Binladen (Sweden) Edward Sandström (Germany) Jörg Müller (Germany) Claudia Hürtgen | A6 | 625 | 4th | 4th |
| 2012 | (Saudi Arabia) Saudi Falcons by Schubert | 5 | BMW Z4 GT3 | (Saudi Arabia) Faisal Binladen (Saudi Arabia) Bandar Alesayi (Germany) Marko Hartung (Saudi Arabia) Fahad Al Gosaibi | A6 | 444 | 42nd | 21st |
| 2013 | (Saudi Arabia) Saudi Falcons by Schubert | 12 | BMW Z4 GT3 | (Saudi Arabia) Abdulaziz Al Faisal (Saudi Arabia) Faisal Binladen< (Austria) Dominik Baumann (Germany) Dominik Schwager (Germany) Dirk Adorf | A6-Pro | 144 | DNF | 13th |
| 2013 | (Saudi Arabia) Saudi Falcons by Schubert | 24 | BMW Z4 GT3 | (Saudi Arabia) Abdulaziz Al Faisal (Saudi Arabia) Faisal Binladen (Germany) Jörg Müller (Germany) Claudia Hürtgen (Germany) Dirk Müller | A6-Pro | 475 | 38th | 9th |
| 2013 | (Netherlands) Racing Divas Team Schubert | 121 | BMW 320d | (Netherlands) Liesette Braams (Netherlands) Sheila Verschuur (Netherlands) Gaby Uljee (Netherlands) Paulien Zwart (Netherlands) Sandra van der Sloot | A3T | 517 | 26th | 1st |
| 2014 | (Germany) SX Team Schubert | 76 | BMW Z4 GT3 | (Canada) Paul Dalla Lana (United States) Bill Auberlen (United States) Dane Cameron (Germany) Dirk Werner (Germany) Claudia Hürtgen | A6-Pro | 583 | 10th | 7th |
| 2014 | (Netherlands) Racing Divas Team Schubert | 90 | BMW 320d | (Netherlands) Natasja Smit - Sø (Netherlands) Gaby Uljee< (Netherlands) Sandra van der Sloot (Netherlands) Paulien Zwart (Netherlands) Sandra van der Sloot | A3T | 517 | 31st | 1st |
| 2017 | (Germany) Schubert Motorsport | 401 | BMW M4 GT4 | (United Kingdom) Ricky Collard (Germany) Jens Klingmann (Germany) Jörg Müller | SPX | 532 | 25th | 4th |
| 2022 | (Germany) Schubert Motorsport | 30 | BMW M4 GT3 | (United Kingdom) Nick Yelloly (United Kingdom) Jordan Witt (Germany) Marcel Lenerz (Germany) Jens Liebhauser | GT3 | 538 | 38th | 10th |
| 2022 | (Germany) Schubert Motorsport | 200 | BMW M2 CS Racing | (Germany) Torsten Schubert (Germany) Michael von Zabiensky (Germany) Stefan von Zabiensky | TCX | 509 | 51st | 6th |
