= Philip Geipel =

German racing driver

- Nationality: German
- Born: 9 December 1986 (age 39) Plauen, East Germany

World Touring Car Championship career
- Debut season: 2006
- Current team: Liqui Moly Team Engstler
- Car number: 38
- Former teams: TFS Yaco Racing
- Starts: 8
- Wins: 0
- Poles: 0
- Fastest laps: 0

Previous series
- 2006-08 2004-05: ADAC Procar Series; German Toyota Yaris Cup

Championship titles
- 2008 2005: ADAC Procar Series; German Toyota Yaris Cup

Toyota GR Yaris driven by Philip Geipel in the German Rallye Championship

Philip Geipel (born 9 December 1986 in Plauen) is a German auto racing driver.

In 2004, Geipel entered the German Toyota Yaris Cup, winning the championship in 2005. He has competed in the FIA World Touring Car Championship in 2006 and 2007. Both times he raced in two rounds at Brno for the Yaco Racing Team in a Toyota Corolla. He raced a Toyota Auris in the 2008 German ADAC Procar Series, winning the championship in what was his third year in the series. He returned to the WTCC in 2009 for Engstler Motorsport.

== Racing record ==
=== Complete WTCC results ===
(key) (Races in bold indicate pole position) (Races in italics indicate fastest lap)

Year	Team	Car	1	2	3	4	5		6	7		8		9		10	11	12	Position	Points
2006	TFS Yaco Racing	Toyota Corolla T-Sport	MNZ	MGN	BRA	OSC	CUR		PUE	BRN		IST		VAL		MAC			-	0
2006	TFS Yaco Racing	Toyota Corolla T-Sport								21	Ret								-	0
2007	TFS Yaco Racing	Toyota Corolla T-Sport	CUR	ZAN	VAL	PAU	BRN		POR	AND		OSC		BRA		MNZ	MAC		-	0
2007	TFS Yaco Racing	Toyota Corolla T-Sport					22	19											-	0
2009	Liqui Moly Team Engstler	BMW 320si	CUR	PUE	VAL	PAU	BRN		EST	BRA}		OSC		IMO		MNZ	OKA	MAC	29th	0
2009	Liqui Moly Team Engstler	BMW 320si										17	20	13	14				29th	0

Sporting positions
Preceded by Franz Engstler	ADAC Procar Series Champion; 2008	Succeeded by incumbent
