= Rainer Bastuck =

German racing driver

- Nationality: German
- Born: 10 March 1960 Lebach, Germany
- Teams: Maurer Motorsport

Rainer Bastuck (born 10 March 1960 in Lebach) is a German auto racing driver and entrepreneur. He founded Bastuck & Co GmbH, an automotive parts company based in Lebach.

== Career ==
Bastuck has regularly competed in what is currently known as the ADAC Procar Series since 2001, finishing third overall for Maurer Motorsport in 2006. He is a Triumph enthusiast and often competes in historic racing.

Bastuck competed in one round of the 2006 World Touring Car Championship season with Maurer Motorsport in a Chevrolet Lacetti, at the Race of the Czech Republic at Masaryk Circuit near Brno. He finished the two races in 22nd and 20th place.
