= 992 Endurance Cup =

Endurance sports car race held in Stavelot, Belgium

Michelin 992 Endurance Cup

992 Endurance Cup
- Venue: Circuit de Spa-Francorchamps
- Location: Stavelot, Belgium; 50°26′14″N 5°58′17″E
- Corporate sponsor: Michelin
- First race: 2024
- First race: 2025
- Duration: 12 Hours

Circuit information
- Length: 7.004 km (4.352 mi)
- Turns: 19

The 992 Endurance Cup is an endurance sports car race held at the Circuit de Spa-Francorchamps in Stavelot, Belgium. It is organized by Creventic in partnership with Porsche Motorsport, exclusively for Porsche 992 GT3 Cup cars.

== History ==
On 14 December 2023, Creventic and Porsche announced the creation of the Michelin 992 Endurance Cup, a 12 hour endurance race for Porsche 992 GT3 Cup cars. It is the first endurance race solely for the latest 911 GT3 Cup. In 2027, the 992.2-spec Porsche 911 GT3 Cup will be eligible to contest the 992 Endurance Cup.

== Classes ==
The first edition had three classes, Pro, Pro-Am and Am while the second had four classes, Pro, Pro-Am, Am-Silver and Am-Bronze. FIA Gold and Platinum rated drivers can participate in the Pro and Pro-Am classes, while FIA Bronze and Silver drivers are eligible for their own classes (Am-Bronze and Am-Silver).

== Winners ==
Year	Pro	Pro-Am	Am	
2024	(Germany) BLACK FALCON Team 48 LOSCH	(Netherlands) Tierra Outdoor Racing by HWM	(Qatar) QMMF by HRT	
2024	(Netherlands) Loek Hartog (Germany) Christopher Mies (Germany) Tobias Müller (Germany) Noah Nagelsdiek	(Netherlands) Ralph Poppelaars (Netherlands) Jop Rappange (Netherlands) Hans Weijs	(Qatar) Abdulla Ali Al-Khelaifi (Qatar) Ghanim Al-Ali (Qatar) Ibrahim Al-Abdulghani (Germany) Julian Hanses	
Year	Pro	Pro-Am	Am-Silver	Am-Bronze
2025	(Luxembourg) 48 LOSCH Motorsport by BLACK FALCON	(Netherlands) Van Berlo Motorsport by Bas Koeten Racing	(France) SebLajoux Racing	(Germany) BLACK FALCON
2025	(Germany) Tobias Müller (Luxembourg) Dylan Pereira (Italy) Gabriele Piana (Luxembourg) Carlos Rivas	(Netherlands) Glenn van Berlo (Netherlands) Marcel Van Berlo (Netherlands) Bart van Helden	(France) Marc Guillot (France) Sebastien Lajoux (France) Stephane Perrin (France) Louis Perrot	(Brazil) João Barbosa (Brazil) William Freire (Brazil) João Gonçalves
2026	(Netherlands) Red Camel-Jordans.nl	(Estonia) Theeba Motorsport by Quanloop EST1 Racing	(Belgium) MM Racing	(Portugal) LMR Motorsport
2026	(Netherlands) Ivo Breukers (Netherlands) Luc Breukers (Netherlands) Rik Breukers (Switzerland) Fabian Danz	(Saudi Arabia) Ali Al Juffali (Saudi Arabia) Reema Juffali (Netherlands) Paul Meijer	(Belgium) Mick Meurrens (Belgium) Tom Meurrens (Belgium) Steve Meurrens	(Portugal) Leandro Martins (Austria) Dieter Svepes (Brazil) André Marques

== See also ==
- 24H Series
