= Tauras (given name) =

- Gender: Male
- Language: Lithuanian

Origin
- Region of origin: Lithuania

Tauras is a Lithuanian masculine given name. Individuals with the name Tauras include:

- Tauras Jogėla (born 1993), Lithuanian basketball player
- Tauras Stumbrys (1970–2004), Lithuanian basketball player
- Tauras Tunyla (born 1993), Lithuanian racing driver
