= 2021 24 Hours of Nürburgring =

Endurance motor race in Germany

Nürburgring 24h track (Nordschleife+GP Circuit without Mercedes-Arena)

The 2021 Nürburgring 24 Hours (officially known as ADAC Total 24h Race at the Nürburgring Nordschleife for sponsorship reasons) was the 49th running of the Nürburgring 24 Hours and took place over 3–6 June 2021. The Manthey Racing Porsche 911 GT3 won the race with the Rowe Racing BMW M6 in second. Rowe Racing and BMW were the defending winners from the previous year's race.

At the time the race became the shortest-ever in terms of both laps and run-time, until the 2024 event would prove to be even shorter. The winner of the race only completed fifty-nine laps in less than 10 hours of green- and yellow-flag running as a result of torrential rain and heavy fog. The race included a large number of different classes of cars, varying in speed from Group GT3 sport cars to a Dacia Logan. Of the 121 cars that started the race, ninety-nine finished.

== Entry list ==
No.	Entrant	Car	Driver 1	Driver 2	Driver 3	Driver 4
SP 9 FIA GT3 (34 entries) SP–X (2 entries)
1	(Germany) Rowe Racing	BMW M6 GT3	(Netherlands) Nicky Catsburg	(United States) John Edwards	(Austria) Philipp Eng	(United Kingdom) Nick Yelloly
2	(Germany) Audi Sport Team Car Collection	Audi R8 LMS Evo	(Germany) Christopher Haase	(Switzerland) Nico Müller	(Switzerland) Patric Niederhauser	(Germany) Markus Winkelhock
3	(Germany) Rutronik Racing	Porsche 911 GT3 R	(France) Julien Andlauer	(France) Romain Dumas	(Germany) Tobias Müller	(Belgium) Laurens Vanthoor
4	(Germany) Mercedes-AMG Team HRT Bilstein	Mercedes-AMG GT3 Evo	(United Kingdom) Adam Christodoulou	(Germany) Maro Engel	(Switzerland) Manuel Metzger	(Germany) Luca Stolz
5	(Germany) Phoenix-IronForce Racing	Audi R8 LMS Evo	(Austria) Max Hofer	(Germany) Vincent Kolb	(Germany) Dennis Marschall	(Germany) Jan-Erik Slooten
6	(Germany) Mercedes-AMG Team HRT	Mercedes-AMG GT3 Evo	(Germany) Patrick Assenheimer	(Germany) Nico Bastian	(Germany) Maro Engel	(Germany) Hubert Haupt
7	(Germany) Mercedes-AMG Team GetSpeed	Mercedes-AMG GT3 Evo	(Germany) Maximilian Götz	(Spain) Daniel Juncadella	(Italy) Raffaele Marciello	(Germany) Fabian Schiller
8	(Germany) Mercedes-AMG Team GetSpeed	Mercedes-AMG GT3 Evo	(France) Jules Gounon	(Germany) Dirk Müller	(Germany) Fabian Schiller	(France) Matthieu Vaxivière
9	(Germany) GetSpeed Performance	Mercedes-AMG GT3 Evo	(Germany) Moritz Kranz	(Finland) Markus Palttala	(United States) John Shoffner	(Belgium) Maxime Soulet
11	(Germany) Phoenix Racing	Audi R8 LMS Evo	(Italy) Michele Beretta	(Germany) Kim-Luis Schramm	(Germany) Frank Stippler	(Denmark) Nicki Thiim
12	(Germany) Lionspeed by Car Collection Motorsport	Audi R8 LMS Evo	(Switzerland) Jean-Louis Hertenstein	(Germany) Fidel Leib	(Germany) Klaus Koch	(Germany) Johannes Stengel
14	(Germany) Hella Pagid - racing one	Ferrari 488 GT3 Evo 2020	(Germany) Mike Jäger	(Germany) Christian Kohlhaas	(Germany) Stephan Köhler	(Germany) Norbert Schneider
15	(Germany) Audi Sport Team Phoenix	Audi R8 LMS Evo	(Italy) Mattia Drudi	(Netherlands) Robin Frijns	(Germany) Frank Stippler	(Belgium) Dries Vanthoor
16	(United States) CP Racing	Mercedes-AMG GT3 Evo	(United States) Charles Espenlaub	(United States) Joe Foster	(United States) Shane Lewis	(United States) Charles Putman
18	(Hong Kong) KCMG	Porsche 911 GT3 R	(Australia) Josh Burdon	(Germany) Marco Holzer	(Switzerland) Alexandre Imperatori	(Italy) Edoardo Liberati
19	(Austria) Konrad Motorsport	Lamborghini Huracán GT3 Evo	(Zimbabwe) Axcil Jefferies	(Switzerland) Alex Fontana	(Italy) Michele Di Martino	(Germany) Tim Zimmermann
20	(Germany) Schubert Motorsport	BMW M6 GT3	(Netherlands) Stef Dusseldorp	(Germany) Jens Klingmann	(Finland) Jesse Krohn	(United Kingdom) Alexander Sims
22	(Germany) Wochenspiegel Team Monschau by Phoenix Racing	Ferrari 488 GT3	(Netherlands) Indy Dontje	(Germany) Daniel Keilwitz	(Germany) Jochen Krumbach	(Germany) Georg Weiss
23	(Germany) Huber Motorsport	Porsche 911 GT3 R	(Germany) Stefan Aust	(Germany) Nico Menzel	(Germany) Philipp Neuffer	(Germany) Marco Seefried
24	(Germany) Lionspeed by Car Collection Motorsport	Audi R8 LMS Evo	(Netherlands) Milan Dontje	(Germany) Patrick Kolb	(Switzerland) Patric Niederhauser	(Italy) Lorenzo Rocco di Torrepadula
25	(Germany) Space Drive Racing	Mercedes-AMG GT3 (2017)	(United Kingdom) Philip Ellis	(Germany) Dominik Farnbacher	(Germany) Tim Scheerbarth	(United Kingdom) Darren Turner
26	(Switzerland) Octane126 Serliana	Ferrari 488 GT3 Evo 2020	(Germany) Björn Grossmann	(Switzerland) Jonathan Hirschi	(Germany) Luca Ludwig	(Switzerland) Simon Trummer
29	(Germany) Audi Sport Team Land	Audi R8 LMS Evo	(South Africa) Kelvin van der Linde	(Germany) Christopher Mies	(Germany) René Rast	(Belgium) Frédéric Vervisch
30	(Germany) Frikadelli Racing Team	Porsche 911 GT3 R	(New Zealand) Earl Bamber	(Australia) Matt Campbell	(France) Mathieu Jaminet	(United Kingdom) Nick Tandy
31	(Germany) Frikadelli Racing Team	Porsche 911 GT3 R	(Belgium) Maxime Martin	(France) Frédéric Makowiecki	(Norway) Dennis Olsen	(France) Patrick Pilet
33	(Germany) Falken Motorsports	Porsche 911 GT3 R	(Germany) Lance David Arnold	(Austria) Klaus Bachler	(Austria) Thomas Preining	(Germany) Dirk Werner
40	(Germany) 10Q Racing Team Hauer & Zabel GbR	Mercedes-AMG GT3 Evo	(Austria) Dominik Baumann	(Netherlands) Yelmer Buurman	(Germany) Kenneth Heyer	(Germany) Thomas Jäger
44	(Germany) Falken Motorsports	Porsche 911 GT3 R	(Austria) Klaus Bachler	(Germany) Sven Müller	(Belgium) Alessio Picariello	(Austria) Martin Ragginger
63	(China) Hankook FFF Racing Team	Lamborghini Huracán GT3 Evo	(Italy) Giacomo Altoè	(Italy) Mirko Bortolotti	(Italy) Marco Mapelli	(France) Franck Perera
77	(Germany) BMW Junior Team Shell	BMW M6 GT3	(Brazil) Augusto Farfus	(United Kingdom) Daniel Harper	(Germany) Max Hesse	(United States) Neil Verhagen
98	(Germany) Rowe Racing	BMW M6 GT3	(South Africa) Sheldon van der Linde	(United States) Connor De Phillippi	(Germany) Martin Tomczyk	(Germany) Marco Wittmann
100	(Germany) Walkenhorst Motorsport	BMW M6 GT3	(Germany) Friedrich von Bohlen	(Germany) Jörg Breuer	(Germany) Henry Walkenhorst	(Germany) Andreas Ziegler
101	(Germany) Walkenhorst Motorsport	BMW M6 GT3	(Norway) Christian Krognes	(Germany) Jörg Müller	(United Kingdom) David Pittard	(United Kingdom) Ben Tuck
102	(Germany) Walkenhorst Motorsport	BMW M6 GT3	(Germany) Mario von Bohlen	(Poland) Kuba Giermaziak	(Germany) Jörg Müller	(Finland) Sami-Matti Trogen
704	(United States) Scuderia Cameron Glickenhaus	Scuderia Cameron Glickenhaus SCG004c	(Germany) Felipe Fernández Laser	(France) Franck Mailleux	(Germany) Thomas Mutsch	(United Kingdom) Richard Westbrook
911	(Germany) Manthey Racing	Porsche 911 GT3 R	(Italy) Matteo Cairoli	(Denmark) Michael Christensen	(France) Kévin Estre	(Germany) Lars Kern
SP 10 – SRO GT4 (7 entries)
34	(Germany) Schnitzelalm Racing	Mercedes-AMG GT4	(Germany) Marek Böckmann	(Germany) Marcel Marchewicz	(Germany) Tim Neuser	(Germany) Reinhold Renger
70	(Switzerland) Hofor Racing by Bonk Motorsport	BMW M4 GT4	(Austria) Michael Fischer	(Germany) Claudia Hürtgen	(Italy) Gabriele Piana	(Germany) Michael Schrey
71	(Germany) PROsport Racing	Aston Martin Vantage AMR GT4	(Belgium) Guido Dumarey	(Belgium) Maxime Dumarey	(Germany) Michael Hess	(United Kingdom) Alexander Walker
72	(Germany) Novel Racing with Toyo Tire by Ring Racing	Toyota GR Supra GT4	(Japan) "Turbo Asahi"	(Japan) Tohjiro Azuma	(Germany) Michael Tischner	(Germany) Heiko Tönges
74	(Germany) Walkenhorst Motorsport	BMW M4 GT4	(United States) Lance Boicelli	(United States) Cameron Evans	(United States) Charlie Postins	(United States) David Thilenius
76	(Germany) Schmickler Performance	Porsche 718 Cayman GT4 Clubsport	(Switzerland) Mauro Calamia	(Switzerland) Ivan Jacoma	(Italy) Roberto Pampanini	(Germany) Kai Riemer
78	(Germany) Allied Racing	Porsche 718 Cayman GT4 Clubsport	(Germany) Dennis Fetzer	(Denmark) Nicolaj Møller Madsen	(Germany) Joel Sturm	(Germany) Luca-Sandro Trefz
SP 7 (4 entries)
58	(Germany) PB Performance	Porsche 991 GT3 I Cup	(Germany) Peter Bonk	(United Kingdom) Bill Cameron	(Germany) Arno Klasen	
68	(United States) Krohn Racing	Porsche 991 GT3 I Cup	(Germany) Mario Farnbacher	(Netherlands) Patrick Huisman	(Sweden) Niclas Jönsson	(United States) Tracy Krohn
69	(Germany) Clickversicherung.de Team	Porsche 991 GT3 II Cup MR	(Germany) Robin Chrzanowski	(Germany) Kersten Jodexnis	(Germany) Max Koch	(New Zealand) Peter Scharmach
80	(Germany) Huber Motorsport	Porsche 991 GT3 II Cup	(Germany) Ulrich Berg	(Germany) Alexander Mies	(Netherlands) Marco van Ramshorst	(Germany) Hans Wehrmann
SP 8 (2 entries)
53	(Germany) Giti Tire Motorsport by WS Racing	Audi R8 LMS GT4 Evo	(United Kingdom) Pippa Mann	(France) Célia Martin	(Denmark) Christina Nielsen	(Germany) Carrie Schreiner
54	(Germany) Novel Racing with Toyo Tire by Ring Racing	Lexus RCF SP8	(Japan) "Turbo Asahi"	(Japan) Takamitsu Matsui	(Germany) Klaus Völker	(Germany) Wilhelm Weirich
SP 8T (2 entries)
36	(Germany) Black Falcon Team TEXTAR	Mercedes-AMG GT4	(Turkey) Mustafa Mehmet Kaya	(Italy) Gabriele Piana	(Germany) Mike Stursberg	(Turkey) Ersin Yücesan
37	(Germany) Schnitzelalm Racing	Mercedes-AMG GT4	(Germany) Peter Posavac	(Germany) Jörg Viebahn	(Germany) Andreas Weiland	(Germany) Guido Wirtz
TCR Class (5 entries)
171	(Germany) Bonk Motorsport	Cupra León Competición TCR	(Germany) Hermann Bock	(Germany) Max Partl	(Switzerland) Alexander Prinz	
172	(Germany) Autohaus M. Fugel	Honda Civic Type R TCR (FK8)	(Germany) Dominik Fugel	(Argentina) Néstor Girolami	(Portugal) Tiago Monteiro	(Germany) Cedrik Totz
173	(Germany) mathilda racing	Cupra León TCR	(Spain) Mikel Azcona	(Germany) Joachim Nett	(Germany) Jürgen Nett	(Germany) Michael Paatz
830	(South Korea) Hyundai Motorsport N	Hyundai Elantra N TCR	(Germany) Marc Basseng	(Germany) Manuel Lauck	(Germany) Moritz Oestreich	
831	(South Korea) Hyundai Motorsport N	Hyundai i30 N TCR	(Germany) Luca Engstler	(Germany) Hendrik Still	(France) Jean-Karl Vernay	
Other Classes
SP 6 (1 entry)
81	(Switzerland) Hofor Racing	BMW M3 V8 (E46) GT	(Austria) Gustav Engljähringer	(Switzerland) Martin Kroll	(Switzerland) Michael Kroll	(Switzerland) Chantal Prinz
SP 4 (2 entries)
105	(Germany) RaceWerk Motorsports UG	BMW 325i	(Germany) Sebastian Schemmann	(Germany) Christian Schotte	(Germany) Serge van Vooren	
325	(Germany) MRC RaceWorld	BMW 325i	(Germany) Carsten Meurer	(Germany) Klaus Müller	(Germany) Volker Schackmann	
SP 4T (3 entries)
86	(Germany) Team Mathol Racing	Porsche 718 Cayman GT4 Clubsport	(United Kingdom) Peter Cate	(Luxembourg) Yann Munhowen	(Luxembourg) Alain Pier	(Germany) Jacek Pydys
87	(Germany) Team Mathol Racing	Porsche 718 Cayman GT4 Clubsport	(Germany) Stefan Branner	(Germany) Andreas Schaflitzl	(Germany) Ernst Thriene	
718		Porsche 718 Cayman GT4 Clubsport	(Germany) Christian Dannesberger	(Germany) Michael Küke	(Germany) Fabian Peitzmeier	(Germany) Ralf Zansen
SP 3 (5 entries)
118	(Germany) Ollis Garage	Dacia Logan	(Germany) "Doom"	(Netherlands) Misha Charoudin	(Germany) Oliver Kriese	(Germany) Michael Lachmayer
119	Toyota Gazoo Racing Team Thailand	Toyota Corolla Altis GT N24	(Thailand) Nattavude Charoensukhawatana	(Thailand) Nattapong Hortongkum	(Thailand) Manat Kulapalanont	(Thailand) Suttipong Smittachartch
120	Toyota Gazoo Racing Team Thailand	Toyota Corolla Altis GT N24	(Taiwan) Chen Jian Hong	(Japan) Naoki Kawamura	(Thailand) Grant Supaphongs	
121	(Belgium) Pit Lane - AMC Sankt Vith	Toyota GT86 Cup	(Belgium) "Brody"	(Belgium) Jacques Derenne	(Belgium) Kurt du Jardyn	(Belgium) Olivier Muytjens
125	(Germany) Automobilclub von Deutschland	Opel Manta (Flying Fox) GT	(Germany) Olaf Beckmann	(Germany) Peter Hass	(Germany) Jürgen Schulten	(Germany) Volker Strycek
SP 3T (5 entries)
10	(Germany) Max Kruse Racing	Volkswagen Golf GTI TCR	(Germany) Christian Gebhardt	(Germany) Andreas Gülden	(Germany) Nick Hancke	(Germany) Benjamin Leuchter
89	(Germany) Carlsson Peninsula by Tomcat	Hyundai i30 N Fastback	(Sweden) Dan Berghult	(Germany) Andrew Engelmann	(Germany) Markus Löw	
90	(Portugal) TJ-Racing-Team	Opel Astra OPC Cup	(France) Jean-Philippe Imparato	(Germany) Tobias Jung	(Portugal) Carlos Antunes Tavares	(France) François Wales
91	(Germany) MSC Sinzig e.V. im ADAC	Volkswagen Golf GTI TCR	(Germany) Volker Garrn	(Armenia) Artur Goroyan	(Germany) Alex Müller	(Germany) Jens Wulf
333	(Germany) Max Kruse Racing	Volkswagen Golf GTI TCR	(Switzerland) Jasmin Preisig	(Germany) Matthias Wasel	(Germany) Gustavo Xavier	(Switzerland) Frédéric Yerly
SP–Pro (1 entry)
350	(Germany) Black Falcon Team IDENTICA	Porsche 991 GT3 II Cup MR	(Germany) Noah Nagelsdiek	(Germany) Florian Neumann	(Luxembourg) Carlos Rivas	(Germany) Hendrik von Danwitz
SP2T (1 entry)
165	(South Korea) Hyundai Motorsport N	Hyundai i20 N	(Germany) Marc Ehret	(Germany) Kai Jordan	(Germany) Markus Lungstrass	(Germany) Guido Naumann
V6 (3 entries)
131	(Germany) Adrenalin Motorsport Team Alzner Automotive	Porsche Cayman S	(Germany) Christian Büllesbach	(Germany) Guido Heinrich	(Germany) Marc Lutz Rühl	(Germany) Daniel Zils
132	(Germany) Team Mathol Racing	Porsche Cayman S	(Germany) Alexander Fielenbach	(Germany) Wolfgang Kaufmann	(Germany) Ioannis Smyrlis	(Germany) Wolfgang Weber
133	(Germany) Oliver Schumacher Racing	Porsche Cayman	(Spain) Nicolas Abril	(United Kingdom) Max Girardo	(Mexico) Xavier Lamadrid, Jr.	(Mexico) Xavier Lamadrid, Sr.
V5 (2 entries)
141	(Germany) Adrenalin Motorsport Team Alzner Automotive	Porsche Cayman	(Germany) Daniel Korn	(Germany) Tobias Korn	(Germany) Ulrich Korn	(Germany) Herbert von Danwitz
142	(Germany) rent2Drive-FAMILIA-racing	Porsche Cayman	(Germany) Philip Ade	(Germany) Holger Gachot	(Germany) Sophia Gachot	(Germany) Mike Schmit
VT3 (1 entry)
168	(Germany) Team Mathol Racing	Porsche 718 Cayman GT4 Clubsport	(Germany) Oliver Louioder	(Switzerland) Rüdiger Schicht	(Germany) Matthias Trinius	(Germany) Wolfgang Weber
VT2 (10 entries)
159	(Germany) FK Performance Motorsport	BMW 330i Racing (2020)	(Switzerland) Miklas Born	(Germany) Christian Konnerth	(Switzerland) Ranko Mijatovic	(Germany) Moritz Oberheim
160	(Germany) Manheller Racing	BMW 328i Racing	(Germany) "Moritz"	(Germany) Carsten Knechtes	(Japan) Yutaka Seki	(Germany) Kurt Strube
162	(Germany) MSC Adenau	Opel Astra OPC Cup	(Germany) Michael Eichhorn	(Germany) Lars Füting	(Germany) Tim Robertz	(Switzerland) Herbie Schmidt
163	(Germany) Team AVIA Sorg Rennsport	BMW 330i Racing (2020)	(Germany) Christopher Bartz	(Italy) Alberto Carobbio	(Denmark) Rasmus Helmich	(Italy) Ugo Vicenzi
164	(Germany) Team AVIA Sorg Rennsport	BMW 330i Racing (2020)	(Germany) Heiko Eichenberg	(Germany) Stephan Epp	(Germany) Philip Schauerte	(Germany) Björn Simon
166	(Germany) Giti Tire Motorsport By WS Racing	Volkswagen Golf VII GTI	(Denmark) Niels Borum	(Switzerland) Sven Friesecke	(Germany) Axel Jahn	(New Zealand) Wayne Moore
167	(Germany) Giti Tire Motorsport By WS Racing	BMW 328i Racing	(Denmark) Nicolaj Kandborg	(Germany) Niklas Kry	(Germany) Tobias Wolf	(Liechtenstein) Fabienne Wohlwend
169	(Germany) Giti Tire Motorsport By WS Racing	BMW 328i Racing	(United Kingdom) James Breakell	(Germany) Raphael Klingmann	(Germany) Daniel Niermann	(Germany) Ulrich Schmidt
330	(Germany) Adrenalin Motorsport Team Alzner Automotive	BMW 330i Racing (2020)	(Germany) Daniel Brink	(Germany) Christopher Rink	(Germany) Philipp Stahlschmidt	(Germany) Daniel Zils
331	(Germany) Adrenalin Motorsport Team Alzner Automotive	BMW 330i Racing (2020)	(Austria) Jacob Erlbacher	(Germany) Yannick Fübrich	(Germany) Marvin Kobus	(Germany) Philipp Leisen
AT (4 entries)
13	(Germany) Fly&Help	Dodge Viper Competition Coupe GT3	(Germany) Bernd Albrecht	(Germany) Sebastian Asch	(Germany) Dirk Riebensahm	(Germany) Reinhard Schall
109	(Germany) OVR Racing Cologne	Ford Mustang GT N24	(Germany) Ralph Caba	(Germany) Michael Mohr	(Germany) Oliver Sprungmann	
320	(Germany) Four Motors	Porsche 991 GT3 II Cup	(Germany) "Smudo"	(Luxembourg) Charles Kauffmann	(Germany) Thomas Kiefer	(Germany) Thomas von Löwis auf Menar
420	(Germany) Four Motors	Porsche 718 Cayman GT4 Clubsport	(Germany) Matthias Beckwermert	(Denmark) Henrik Bollerslev	(United Kingdom) Immanuel Vinke	(Germany) Hermann Wekf
M240i (2 entries)
230	(Germany) Team AVIA Sorg Rennsport	BMW M240i Racing	(New Zealand) Chris Allen	(Germany) Luis Ramirez	(France) Fabrice Reicher	(Germany) Harald Rettich
231	(Germany) Adrenalin Motorsport Team Alzner Automotive	BMW M240i Racing	(Germany) Thomas Ardelt	(United Kingdom) David Drinkwater	(Germany) Simon Klemund	(Germany) Herwarth Wartenburg
V4 (3 entries)
151		BMW 325i	(Germany) Oliver Frisse	(Germany) Jürgen Huber	(Germany) Florian Quante	(Germany) Simon Sagmeister
152	(Germany) Team mcchip-dkr	BMW 325i	(Germany) Lucas Lange	(Germany) Sascha Lott	(Germany) Alexander Meixner	
153	(Germany) Müskens Motorsport with TM Racing	BMW 325i	(Germany) Philipp Gresek	(Germany) Richard Gresek	(Germany) Moritz Gusenbauer	(Germany) Werner Gusenbauer
Cup5 (6 entries)
236	(Germany) MSC Wahlscheid Keeevin Sports & Racing	BMW M2 ClubSport Racing	(Germany) Klaus Fassbender	(Germany) Lars Harbeck	(Germany) Christoph Hewer	(Germany) Sven Markert
238	(Switzerland) Hofor Racing by Bonk Motorsport	BMW M2 ClubSport Racing	(Germany) Michael Bonk	(Austria) Markus Fischer	(Germany) Jürgen Meyer	(Germany) Rainer Partl
240	(Germany) Adrenalin Motorsport Team Alzner Automotive	BMW M2 ClubSport Racing	(Germany) Roland Fröse	(Germany) Marcel Fugel	(Italy) Francesco Merlini	(Germany) Tobias Vazquez
241	(Germany) Adrenalin Motorsport Team Alzner Automotive	BMW M2 ClubSport Racing	(Austria) Markus Flasch	(Germany) Matthias Malmedie	(Germany) Nikolaus Schelle	(Germany) Jörg Weidinger
242	(Germany) Adrenalin Motorsport Team Alzner Automotive	BMW M2 ClubSport Racing	(Luxembourg) Charles Oakes	(Germany) Rudi Speich	(Norway) Einar Thorsen	(Germany) Roland Waschkau
890	(Germany) Schubert Motorsport	BMW M2 ClubSport Racing	(Germany) Cristopher Dreyspring	(Germany) Marcel Lenerz	(Germany) Torsten Schubert	(Germany) Michael von Zabiensky
CupX (7 entries)
60	(Germany) Teichmann Racing GT4	KTM X-Bow GT4	(Germany) Stephen Brodmerkel	(Germany) Ercan Kara Osman	(Austria) Karl Heinz Teichmann	(Austria) Laura Kraihamer
75	(Austria) auto motor und sport TRUE RACING	KTM X-Bow GTX Concept	(Germany) Jens Dralle	(Germany) Christian Menzel	(Germany) Markus Oestreich	(Germany) Tim Schrick
110	(Germany) Teichmann Racing GT4	KTM X-Bow GT4	(Germany) Dirk Adorf	(Luxembourg) Daniel Bohr	(Germany) Timo Mölig	(Germany) Felix von der Laden
111	(Germany) Teichmann Racing GT4	KTM X-Bow GT4	(Germany) Georg Griesemann	(Germany) Maik Rönnefarth	(Germany) Tim Sandtler	(Germany) Yves Volte
112	(Germany) Teichmann Racing GTX	KTM X-Bow GTX Concept	(Austria) Constantin Schöll	(Spain) Andy Soucek	(Germany) Peter Terting	(United States) Dennis Trebing
114	(Austria) True Racing	KTM X-Bow GTX Concept	(Austria) Reinhard Kofler	(Austria) Ferdinand Stuck	(Austria) Johannes Stuck	
115	(Germany) Team mcchip-dkr	KTM X-Bow GTX Concept	(Germany) Christoph Breuer	(Germany) Heiko Hammel	(Germany) Tim Heinemann	(Germany) "Dieter Schmidtmann"
Cup3 (10 entries)
301	(Germany) EPS Rennsport	Porsche 718 Cayman GT4 Clubsport	(Germany) Henning Deuster	(Germany) Christian Rosen	(Germany) Philip Hamprecht	(Germany) Patrick Steuer
302	(Germany) W&S Motorsport	Porsche 718 Cayman GT4 Clubsport	(Germany) Daniel Blickle	(Germany) Walter Schweikart	(Germany) Niklas Steinhaus	(Germany) Jürgen Vöhringer
303	(Germany) KKrämer Racing	Porsche Cayman GT4 Clubsport MR	(Germany) Christopher Brück	(Germany) Steffen Höber	(Germany) Karsten Krämer	(Russia) Alexey Veremenko
304	(Germany) KKrämer Racing	Porsche Cayman GT4 Clubsport MR	(United States) Jean-Francois Brunot	(Germany) Henning Cramer	(Germany) Afschin Fatemi	(Germany) Steffen Höber
305	(Germany) G-Tech Competition	Porsche 718 Cayman GT4 Clubsport	(Germany) Ben Bünnagel	(Germany) Fabio Grosse	(Switzerland) Patrick Grütter	(Germany) Max Kronenberg
306	(Germany) G-Tech Competition	Porsche Cayman GT4 Clubsport MR	(Netherlands) Tom Coronel	(Germany) Alexander Kroker	(Germany) Maximilian Kurz	(Netherlands) Jan Jaap van Roon
308	(Germany) Black Falcon Team TEXTAR	Porsche 718 Cayman GT4 Clubsport	(Germany) "Iceman"	(Russia) Alexander Akimenkov	(Russia) Vasilii Selivanov	(Germany) Tobias Wahl
309	(Belgium) Mühlner Motorsport	Porsche 718 Cayman GT4 Clubsport	(Germany) Marcel Hoppe	(Germany) Thorsten Jung	(Germany) Michael Rebhan	(Norway) Oskar Sandberg
310	(Belgium) Mühlner Motorsport	Porsche 718 Cayman GT4 Clubsport	(Germany) Andreas Patzelt	(Norway) Sindre Setsaas	(Germany) Dirk Vleugels	(Germany) Janis Waldow
311	(Germany) FK Performance Motorsport	Porsche 718 Cayman GT4 Clubsport	(Germany) Jens Mötefindt	(Germany) Nico Otto	(Germany) Thorsten Wolter	(Germany) Nick Wüstenhagen

== Race results ==
Pos	Class	No.	Team / Entrant	Drivers	Vehicle	Laps	Time/Retired
1	**SP9**	**911**	**(Germany) Manthey Racing (Note: Lars Kern was an entered driver in the No. 911 Manthey Racing car, but was unable to take part in the race because of illness. As he did not complete the required 2 laps, he was not credited with the win.)**	**(Italy) Matteo Cairoli (Denmark) Michael Christensen (France) Kévin Estre**	**Porsche 911 GT3 R**	**59**	**24:04:11.960**
2	SP9	98	(Germany) Rowe Racing	(Germany) Marco Wittmann (Germany) Martin Tomczyk (United States) Connor De Phillippi (South Africa) Sheldon van der Linde	BMW M6 GT3	59	+8.817
3	SP9	7	(Germany) Mercedes-AMG Team GetSpeed	(Germany) Maximilian Götz (Italy) Raffaele Marciello (Spain) Daniel Juncadella (Germany) Fabian Schiller	Mercedes-AMG GT3 Evo	59	+49.608
4	SP9	44	(Germany) Falken Motorsports	(Austria) Klaus Bachler (Germany) Sven Müller (Belgium) Alessio Picariello (Austria) Martin Ragginger	Porsche 911 GT3 R	59	+53.100
5	SP9	2	(Germany) Audi Sport Team Car Collection	(Germany) Christopher Haase (Switzerland) Nico Müller (Switzerland) Patric Niederhauser (Germany) Markus Winkelhock	Audi R8 LMS Evo	59	+53.266
6	SP9	20	(Germany) Schubert Motorsport	(Netherlands) Stef Dusseldorp (Germany) Jens Klingmann (Finland) Jesse Krohn (United Kingdom) Alexander Sims	BMW M6 GT3	59	+54.301
7	SP9	8	(Germany) Mercedes-AMG Team GetSpeed	(France) Jules Gounon (Germany) Dirk Müller (Germany) Fabian Schiller (France) Matthieu Vaxivière	Mercedes-AMG GT3 Evo	59	+55.223
8	SP9	23	(Germany) Huber Motorsport	(Germany) Stefan Aust (Germany) Nico Menzel (Germany) Philipp Neuffer (Germany) Marco Seefried	Porsche 911 GT3 R	59	+2:54.805
9	SP9	33	(Germany) Falken Motorsports	(Germany) Lance David Arnold (Austria) Klaus Bachler (Austria) Thomas Preining (Germany) Dirk Werner	Porsche 911 GT3 R	59	+3:13.741
10	SP9	40	(Germany) 10Q Racing Team Hauer & Zabel GbR	(Austria) Dominik Baumann (Netherlands) Yelmer Buurman (Germany) Kenneth Heyer (Germany) Thomas Jäger	Mercedes-AMG GT3 Evo	58	+1 lap
11	SP9	5	(Germany) Phoenix-IronForce Racing	(Austria) Max Hofer (Germany) Vincent Kolb (Germany) Dennis Marschall (Germany) Jan-Erik Slooten	Audi R8 LMS Evo	58	+1 lap
12	SP9	102	(Germany) Walkenhorst Motorsport	(Germany) Mario von Bohlen (Poland) Kuba Giermaziak (Germany) Jörg Müller (Finland) Sami-Matti Trogen	BMW M6 GT3	58	+1 lap
13	SP9	22	(Germany) Wochenspiegel Team Monschau by Phoenix Racing	(Netherlands) Indy Dontje (Germany) Daniel Keilwitz (Germany) Jochen Krumbach (Germany) Georg Weiss	Ferrari 488 GT3	58	+1 lap
14	SP9	9	(Germany) GetSpeed Performance	(Germany) Moritz Kranz (Finland) Markus Palttala (United States) John Shoffner (Belgium) Maxime Soulet	Mercedes-AMG GT3 Evo	58	+1 lap
15	SP9	101	(Germany) Walkenhorst Motorsport	(Norway) Christian Krognes (Germany) Jörg Müller (United Kingdom) David Pittard (United Kingdom) Ben Tuck	BMW M6 GT3	57	+2 laps
16	**SP-X**	**25**	**(Germany) Space Drive Racing**	**(United Kingdom) Philip Ellis (Germany) Dominik Farnbacher (Germany) Tim Scheerbarth (United Kingdom) Darren Turner**	**Mercedes-AMG GT3 (2017)**	**56**	**+3 laps**
17	SP9	11	(Germany) Phoenix Racing	(Italy) Michele Beretta (Germany) Kim-Luis Schramm (Germany) Frank Stippler (Denmark) Nicki Thiim	Audi R8 LMS Evo	56	+3 laps
18	SP9	19	(Austria) Konrad Motorsport	(Switzerland) Alex Fontana (Zimbabwe) Axcil Jefferies (Italy) Michele Di Martino (Germany) Tim Zimmermann	Lamborghini Huracán GT3 Evo	56	+3 laps
19	SP9	16	(United States) CP Racing	(United States) Charles Espenlaub (United States) Joe Foster (United States) Shane Lewis (United States) Charles Putman	Mercedes-AMG GT3 Evo	56	+3 laps
20	SP-X	704	(United States) Scuderia Cameron Glickenhaus	(Germany) Felipe Fernández Laser (France) Franck Mailleux (Germany) Thomas Mutsch (United Kingdom) Richard Westbrook	Scuderia Cameron Glickenhaus SCG004c	55	+4 laps
21	**Cup X**	**114**	**(Austria) True Racing**	**(Austria) Reinhard Kofler (Austria) Ferdinand Stuck (Austria) Johannes Stuck**	**KTM X-Bow GTX Concept**	**55**	**+4 laps**
22	SP9	14	(Germany) Hella Pagid - racing one	(Germany) Mike Jäger (Germany) Christian Kohlhaas (Germany) Stephan Köhler (Germany) Norbert Schneider	Ferrari 488 GT3 Evo 2020	54	+5 laps
23	Cup X	115	(Germany) Team mcchip-dkr	(Germany) Christoph Breuer (Germany) Heiko Hammel (Germany) Tim Heinemann (Germany) "Dieter Schmidtmann"	KTM X-Bow GTX Concept	54	+5 laps
24	SP9	24	(Germany) Lionspeed by Car Collection Motorsport	(Netherlands) Milan Dontje (Germany) Patrick Kolb (Switzerland) Patric Niederhauser (Italy) Lorenzo Rocco di Torrepadula	Audi R8 LMS Evo	54	+5 laps
25	**SP10**	**34**	**(Germany) Schnitzelalm Racing**	**(Germany) Marek Böckmann (Germany) Marcel Marchewicz (Germany) Tim Neuser (Germany) Reinhold Renger**	**Mercedes-AMG GT4**	**54**	**+5 laps**
26	**SP8T**	**36**	**(Germany) Black Falcon Team TEXTAR**	**(Turkey) Mustafa Mehmet Kaya (Italy) Gabriele Piana (Germany) Mike Stursberg (Turkey) Ersin Yücesan**	**Mercedes-AMG GT4**	**54**	**+5 laps**
27	SP10	70	(Switzerland) Hofor Racing by Bonk Motorsport	(Austria) Michael Fischer (Germany) Claudia Hürtgen (Italy) Gabriele Piana (Germany) Michael Schrey	BMW M4 GT4	54	+5 laps
28	SP10	78	(Germany) Allied Racing	(Germany) Dennis Fetzer (Denmark) Nicolaj Møller Madsen (Germany) Joel Sturm (Germany) Luca-Sandro Trefz	Porsche 718 Cayman GT4 Clubsport	54	+5 laps
29	SP8T	37	(Germany) Schnitzelalm Racing	(Germany) Peter Posavac (Germany) Jörg Viebahn (Germany) Andreas Weiland (Germany) Guido Wirtz	Mercedes-AMG GT4	54	+5 laps
30	SP9	12	(Germany) Lionspeed by Car Collection Motorsport	(Switzerland) Jean-Louis Hertenstein (Germany) Klaus Koch (Germany) Fidel Leib (Germany) Johannes Stengel	Audi R8 LMS Evo	54	+5 laps
31	SP10	76	(Germany) Schmickler Performance	(Switzerland) Mauro Calamia (Switzerland) Ivan Jacoma (Italy) Roberto Pampanini (Germany) Kai Riemer	Porsche 718 Cayman GT4 Clubsport	54	+5 laps
32	**TCR**	**830**	**(South Korea) Hyundai Motorsport N**	**(Germany) Marc Basseng (Germany) Manuel Lauck (Germany) Moritz Oestreich**	**Hyundai Elantra N TCR**	**54**	**+5 laps**
33	TCR	831	(South Korea) Hyundai Motorsport N	(Germany) Luca Engstler (Germany) Hendrik Still (France) Jean-Karl Vernay	Hyundai i30 N TCR	54	+5 laps
34	**Cup 3**	**305**	**(Germany) G-Tech Competition**	**(Germany) Ben Bünnagel (Germany) Fabio Grosse (Switzerland) Patrick Grütter (Germany) Max Kronenberg**	**Porsche 718 Cayman GT4 Clubsport**	**54**	**+5 laps**
35	Cup 3	309	(Belgium) Mühlner Motorsport	(Germany) Marcel Hoppe (Germany) Thorsten Jung (Germany) Michael Rebhan (Norway) Oskar Sandberg	Porsche 718 Cayman GT4 Clubsport	54	+5 laps
36	**SP3T**	**10**	**(Germany) Max Kruse Racing**	**(Germany) Christian Gebhardt (Germany) Andreas Gülden (Germany) Nick Hancke (Germany) Benjamin Leuchter**	**Volkswagen Golf GTI TCR**	**54**	**+5 laps**
37	**SP7**	**80**	**(Germany) Huber Motorsport**	**(Germany) Ulrich Berg (Germany) Alexander Mies (Netherlands) Marco van Ramshorst (Germany) Hans Wehrmann**	**Porsche 991 GT3 II Cup**	**53**	**+6 laps**
38	Cup 3	310	(Belgium) Mühlner Motorsport	(Germany) Andreas Patzelt (Norway) Sindre Setsaas (Germany) Dirk Vleugels (Germany) Janis Waldow	Porsche 718 Cayman GT4 Clubsport	53	+6 laps
39	SP3T	333	(Germany) Max Kruse Racing	(Switzerland) Jasmin Preisig (Germany) Matthias Wasel (Germany) Gustavo Xavier (Switzerland) Frédéric Yerly	Volkswagen Golf GTI TCR	53	+6 laps
40	Cup 3	303	(Germany) KKrämer Racing	(Germany) Christopher Brück (Germany) Steffen Höber (Germany) Karsten Krämer (Russia) Alexey Veremenko	Porsche Cayman GT4 Clubsport MR	53	+6 laps
41	Cup 3	302	(Germany) W&S Motorsport	(Germany) Daniel Blickle (Germany) Walter Schweikart (Germany) Niklas Steinhaus (Germany) Jürgen Vöhringer	Porsche 718 Cayman GT4 Clubsport	53	+6 laps
42	**AT-G**	**320**	**(Germany) Four Motors**	**(Germany) "Smudo" (Luxembourg) Charles Kauffmann (Germany) Thomas Kiefer (Germany) Thomas von Löwis auf Menar**	**Porsche 991 GT3 II Cup**	**53**	**+6 laps**
43	TCR	172	(Germany) Autohaus M. Fugel	(Germany) Dominik Fugel (Argentina) Néstor Girolami (Portugal) Tiago Monteiro (Germany) Cedrik Totz	Honda Civic Type R TCR (FK8)	53	+6 laps
44	AT-G	420	(Germany) Four Motors	(Germany) Matthias Beckwermert (Denmark) Henrik Bollerslev (United Kingdom) Immanuel Vinke (Germany) Hermann Wekf	Porsche 718 Cayman GT4 Clubsport	53	+6 laps
45	**SP8**	**53**	**(Germany) Giti Tire Motorsport by WS Racing**	**(United Kingdom) Pippa Mann (France) Célia Martin (Denmark) Christina Nielsen (Germany) Carrie Schreiner**	**Audi R8 LMS GT4 Evo**	**52**	**+7 laps**
46	Cup 3	308	(Germany) Black Falcon Team TEXTAR	(Germany) "Iceman" (Russia) Alexander Akimenkov (Russia) Vasilii Selivanov (Germany) Tobias Wahl	Porsche 718 Cayman GT4 Clubsport	52	+7 laps
47	Cup X	111	(Germany) Teichmann Racing GT4	(Germany) Georg Griesemann (Germany) Maik Rönnefarth (Germany) Tim Sandtler (Germany) Yves Volte	KTM X-Bow GT4	52	+7 laps
48	SP10	74	(Germany) Walkenhorst Motorsport	(United States) Lance Boicelli (United States) Cameron Evans (United States) Charlie Postins (United States) David Thilenius	BMW M4 GT4	52	+7 laps
49	SP9	100	(Germany) Walkenhorst Motorsport	(Germany) Friedrich von Bohlen (Germany) Jörg Breuer (Germany) Henry Walkenhorst (Germany) Andreas Ziegler	BMW M6 GT3	51	+8 laps
50	Cup 3	304	(Germany) KKrämer Racing	(United States) Jean-Francois Brunot (Germany) Henning Cramer (Germany) Afschin Fatemi (Germany) Steffen Höber	Porsche Cayman GT4 Clubsport MR	51	+8 laps
51	**VT2**	**159**	**(Germany) FK Performance Motorsport**	**(Switzerland) Miklas Born (Germany) Christian Konnerth (Switzerland) Ranko Mijatovic (Germany) Moritz Oberheim**	**BMW 330i Racing (2020)**	**51**	**+8 laps**
52	VT2	330	(Germany) Adrenalin Motorsport Team Alzner Automotive	(Germany) Daniel Brink (Germany) Christopher Rink (Germany) Philipp Stahlschmidt (Germany) Daniel Zils	BMW 330i Racing (2020)	51	+8 laps
53	Cup 3	301	(Germany) EPS Rennsport	(Germany) Henning Deuster (Germany) Christian Rosen (Germany) Philip Hamprecht (Germany) Patrick Steuer	Porsche 718 Cayman GT4 Clubsport	51	+8 laps
54	SP8	54	(Germany) Novel Racing with Toyo Tire by Ring Racing	(Japan) "Turbo Asahi" (Japan) Takamitsu Matsui (Germany) Klaus Völker (Germany) Wilhelm Weirich	Lexus RCF SP8	51	+8 laps
55	Cup X	112	(Germany) Teichmann Racing GTX	(Austria) Constantin Schöll (Spain) Andy Soucek (Germany) Peter Terting (United States) Dennis Trebing	KTM X-Bow GTX Concept	50	+9 laps
56	**V6**	**132**	**(Germany) Team Mathol Racing**	**(Germany) Alexander Fielenbach (Germany) Wolfgang Kaufmann (Germany) Ioannis Smyrlis (Germany) Wolfgang Weber**	**Porsche Cayman S**	**50**	**+9 laps**
57	**SP4T**	**86**	**(Germany) Team Mathol Racing**	**(United Kingdom) Peter Cate (Luxembourg) Yann Munhowen (Luxembourg) Alain Pier (Poland) Jacek Pydys**	**Porsche 718 Cayman GT4 Clubsport**	**50**	**+9 laps**
58	AT-G	13	(Germany) Fly&Help	(Germany) Bernd Albrecht (Germany) Sebastian Asch (Germany) Dirk Riebensahm (Germany) Reinhard Schall	Dodge Viper Competition Coupe GT3	50	+9 laps
59	SP4T	718		(Germany) Christian Dannesberger (Germany) Michael Küke (Germany) Fabian Peitzmeier (Germany) Ralf Zansen	Porsche 718 Cayman GT4 Clubsport	50	+9 laps
60	VT2	331	(Germany) Adrenalin Motorsport Team Alzner Automotive	(Austria) Jacob Erlbacher (Germany) Yannick Fübrich (Germany) Marvin Kobus (Germany) Philipp Leisen	BMW 330i Racing (2020)	50	+9 laps
61	VT2	160	(Germany) Manheller Racing	(Germany) "Moritz" (Germany) Carsten Knechtes (Japan) Yutaka Seki (Germany) Kurt Strube	BMW 328i Racing	50	+9 laps
62	V6	131	(Germany) Adrenalin Motorsport Team Alzner Automotive	(Germany) Christian Büllesbach (Germany) Guido Heinrich (Germany) Marc Lutz Rühl (Germany) Daniel Zils	Porsche Cayman S	49	+10 laps
63	SP9 Pro	18	(Hong Kong) KCMG	(Australia) Josh Burdon (Germany) Marco Holzer (Switzerland) Alexandre Imperatori (Italy) Edoardo Liberati	Porsche 911 GT3 R	49	+10 laps
64	SP10	72	(Germany) Novel Racing with Toyo Tire by Ring Racing	(Japan) "Turbo Asahi" (Japan) Tohjiro Azuma (Germany) Michael Tischner (Germany) Heiko Tönges	Toyota GR Supra GT4	49	+10 laps
65	**Cup 5**	**242**	**(Germany) Adrenalin Motorsport Team Alzner Automotive**	**(Luxembourg) Charles Oakes (Germany) Rudi Speich (Norway) Einar Thorsen (Germany) Roland Waschkau**	**BMW M2 ClubSport Racing**	**49**	**+10 laps**
66	AT-G	109	(Germany) OVR Racing Cologne	(Germany) Ralph Caba (Germany) Michael Mohr (Germany) Oliver Sprungmann	Ford Mustang GT N24	48	+11 laps
67	Cup 5	238	(Switzerland) Hofor Racing by Bonk Motorsport	(Germany) Michael Bonk (Austria) Markus Fischer (Germany) Jürgen Meyer (Germany) Rainer Partl	BMW M2 ClubSport Racing	48	+11 laps
68	Cup 5	890	(Germany) Schubert Motorsport	(Germany) Cristopher Dreyspring (Germany) Marcel Lenerz (Germany) Torsten Schubert (Germany) Michael von Zabiensky	BMW M2 ClubSport Racing	48	+11 laps
69	Cup X	110	(Germany) Teichmann Racing GT4	(Germany) Dirk Adorf (Luxembourg) Daniel Bohr (Germany) Timo Mölig (Germany) Felix von der Laden	KTM X-Bow GT4	47	+12 laps
70	SP3T	90	(Portugal) TJ-Racing-Team	(France) Jean-Philippe Imparato (Germany) Tobias Jung (Portugal) Carlos Antunes Tavares (France) François Wales	Opel Astra OPC Cup	47	+12 laps
71	**V4**	**151**		**(Germany) Oliver Frisse (Germany) Jürgen Huber (Germany) Florian Quante (Germany) Simon Sagmeister**	**BMW 325i**	**47**	**+12 laps**
72	Cup X	75	(Austria) auto motor und sport TRUE RACING	(Germany) Jens Dralle (Germany) Christian Menzel (Germany) Markus Oestreich (Germany) Tim Schrick	KTM X-Bow GTX Concept	47	+12 laps
73	**SP3**	**120**	**Toyota Gazoo Racing Team Thailand**	**(Taiwan) Chen Jian Hong (Japan) Naoki Kawamura (Thailand) Grant Supaphongs**	**Toyota Corolla Altis GT N24**	**47**	**+12 laps**
74	Cup 5	241	(Germany) Adrenalin Motorsport Team Alzner Automotive	(Austria) Markus Flasch (Germany) Matthias Malmedie (Germany) Nikolaus Schelle (Germany) Jörg Weidinger	BMW M2 ClubSport Racing	47	+12 laps
75	Cup X	60	(Germany) Teichmann Racing GT4	(Germany) Stephen Brodmerkel (Austria) Laura Kraihamer (Germany) Ercan Kara Osman (Austria) Karl Heinz Teichmann	KTM X-Bow GT4	47	+12 laps
76	**M240i Cup**	**231**	**(Germany) Adrenalin Motorsport Team Alzner Automotive**	**(Germany) Herwarth Wartenburg (Germany) Thomas Ardelt (Germany) Simon Klemund (United Kingdom) David Drinkwater**	**BMW M240i Racing**	**47**	**+12 laps**
77	VT2	163	(Germany) Team AVIA Sorg Rennsport	(Germany) Christopher Bartz (Italy) Alberto Carobbio (Denmark) Rasmus Helmich (Italy) Ugo Vicenzi	BMW 330i Racing (2020)	46	+13 laps
78	SP3	121	(Belgium) Pit Lane - AMC Sankt Vith	(Belgium) "Brody" (Belgium) Jacques Derenne (Belgium) Kurt du Jardyn (Belgium) Olivier Muytjens	Toyota GT86 Cup	46	+13 laps
79	SP3T	89	(Germany) Carlsson Peninsula by Tomcat	(Sweden) Dan Berghult (Germany) Andrew Engelmann (Germany) Markus Löw	Hyundai i30 N Fastback	46	+13 laps
80	V6	133	(Germany) Oliver Schumacher Racing	(Spain) Nicolas Abrill (United Kingdom) Max Girardo (Mexico) Xavier Lamadrid, Sr. (Mexico) Xavier Lamadrid, Jr.	Porsche Cayman	46	+13 laps
81	V4	153	(Germany) Müskens Motorsport with TM Racing	(Germany) Philipp Gresek (Germany) Richard Gresek (Germany) Moritz Gusenbauer (Germany) Werner Gusenbauer	BMW 325i	46	+13 laps
82	**VT3**	**168**	**(Germany) Team Mathol Racing**	**(Germany) Oliver Louioder (Germany) Matthias Trinius (Germany) Wolfgang Weber (Switzerland) Rüdiger Schicht**	**Porsche 718 Cayman GT4 Clubsport**	**46**	**+13 laps**
83	SP10	71	(Germany) PROsport Racing	(Belgium) Guido Dumarey (Belgium) Maxime Dumarey (Germany) Michael Hess (United Kingdom) Alexander Walker	Aston Martin Vantage AMR GT4	46	+13 laps
84	**SP4**	**325**	**(Germany) MRC RaceWorld**	**(Germany) Carsten Meurer (Germany) Klaus Müller (Germany) Volker Schackmann**	**BMW 325i**	**45**	**+14 laps**
85	V4	152	(Germany) Team mcchip-dkr	(Germany) Lucas Lange (Germany) Sascha Lott (Germany) Alexander Meixner	BMW 325i	45	+14 laps
86	**SP6**	**81**	**(Switzerland) Hofor Racing**	**(Austria) Gustav Engljähringer (Switzerland) Martin Kroll (Switzerland) Michael Kroll (Switzerland) Chantal Prinz**	**BMW M3 V8 (E46) GT**	**45**	**+14 laps**
87	SP3	119	Toyota Gazoo Racing Team Thailand	(Thailand) Nattavude Charoensukhawatana (Thailand) Nattapong Hortongkum (Thailand) Manat Kulapalanont (Thailand) Suttipong Smittachartch	Toyota Corolla Altis GT N24	45	+14 laps
88	TCR	171	(Germany) Bonk Motorsport	(Germany) Hermann Bock (Germany) Max Partl (Switzerland) Alexander Prinz	Cupra León Competición TCR	44	+15 laps
89	**SP2T**	**165**	**(South Korea) Hyundai Motorsport**	**(Germany) Marc Ehret (Germany) Kai Jordan (Germany) Markus Lungstrass (Germany) Guido Naumann**	**Hyundai i20 N**	**44**	**+15 laps**
90	SP3T	91	(Germany) MSC Sinzig e.V. im ADAC	(Germany) Volker Garrn (Armenia) Artur Goroyan (Germany) Alex Müller (Germany) Jens Wulf	Volkswagen Golf GTI TCR	44	+15 laps
91	VT2	164	(Germany) Team AVIA Sorg Rennsport	(Germany) Heiko Eichenberg (Germany) Stephan Epp (Germany) Philip Schauerte (Germany) Björn Simon	BMW 330i Racing (2020)	44	+15 laps
92	Cup 5	236	(Germany) MSC Wahlscheid Keeevin Sports & Racing	(Germany) Klaus Fassbender (Germany) Lars Harbeck (Germany) Christoph Hewer (Germany) Sven Markert	BMW M2 ClubSport Racing	44	+15 laps
93	VT2	166	(Germany) Giti Tire Motorsport By WS Racing	(Denmark) Niels Borum (Switzerland) Sven Friesecke (Germany) Axel Jahn (New Zealand) Wayne Moore	Volkswagen Golf VII GTI	44	+15 laps
94	VT2	162	(Germany) MSC Adenau	(Germany) Michael Eichhorn (Germany) Lars Füting (Germany) Tim Robertz (Switzerland) Herbie Schmidt	Opel Astra OPC Cup	43	+16 laps
95	SP7	58	(Germany) PB Performance	(Germany) Peter Bonk (United Kingdom) Bill Cameron (Germany) Arno Klasen	Porsche 991 GT3 I Cup	43	+16 laps
96	M240i Cup	230	(Germany) Team AVIA Sorg Rennsport	(New Zealand) Chris Allen (Germany) Luis Ramirez (France) Fabrice Reicher (Germany) Harald Rettich	BMW M240i Racing	43	+16 laps
97	VT2	167	(Germany) Giti Tire Motorsport By WS Racing	(Denmark) Nicolaj Kandborg (Germany) Niklas Kry (Germany) Tobias Wolf (Liechtenstein) Fabienne Wohlwend	BMW 328i Racing	43	+16 laps
98	SP3	118	(Germany) Ollis Garage	(Germany) "Doom" (Netherlands) Misha Charoudin (Germany) Oliver Kriese (Germany) Michael Lachmayer	Dacia Logan Mk.1	41	+18 laps
99	**V5**	**142**	**(Germany) rent2Drive-FAMILIA-racing**	**(Germany) Philip Ade (Germany) Holger Gachot (Germany) Sophia Gachot (Germany) Mike Schmit**	**Porsche Cayman**	**41**	**+18 laps**
DNF	SP9	31	(Germany) Frikadelli Racing Team	(Belgium) Maxime Martin (France) Frédéric Makowiecki (Norway) Dennis Olsen (France) Patrick Pilet	Porsche 911 GT3 R	54	Crash damage
DNF	SP9	77	(Germany) BMW Junior Team Shell	(Brazil) Augusto Farfus (United Kingdom) Daniel Harper (Germany) Max Hesse (United States) Neil Verhagen	BMW M6 GT3	54	Crash damage
DNF	SP9	3	(Germany) Rutronik Racing	(France) Julien Andlauer (France) Romain Dumas (Germany) Tobias Müller (Belgium) Laurens Vanthoor	Porsche 911 GT3 R	47	Suspension
DNF	SP9	29	(Germany) Audi Sport Team Land	(South Africa) Kelvin van der Linde (Germany) Christopher Mies (Germany) Rene Rast (Belgium) Frédéric Vervisch	Audi R8 LMS Evo	47	Spun out
DNF	SP9	6	(Germany) Mercedes-AMG Team HRT	(Germany) Patrick Assenheimer (Germany) Nico Bastian (Germany) Maro Engel (Germany) Hubert Haupt	Mercedes-AMG GT3 Evo	46	
DNF	SP9	1	(Germany) Rowe Racing	(Netherlands) Nicky Catsburg (United States) John Edwards (Austria) Philipp Eng (United Kingdom) Nick Yelloly	BMW M6 GT3	42	Electrical
DNF	Cup 3	311	(Germany) FK Performance Motorsport	(Germany) Jens Mötefindt (Germany) Nico Otto (Germany) Thorsten Wolter (Germany) Nick Wüstenhagen	Porsche 718 Cayman GT4 Clubsport	38	
DNF	Cup 5	240	(Germany) Adrenalin Motorsport Team Alzner Automotive	(Germany) Roland Fröse (Germany) Marcel Fugel (Italy) Francesco Merlini (Germany) Tobias Vazquez	BMW M2 ClubSport Racing	38	Crash
DNF	SP9	4	(Germany) Mercedes-AMG Team HRT Bilstein	(United Kingdom) Adam Christodoulou (Germany) Maro Engel (Switzerland) Manuel Metzger (Germany) Luca Stolz	Mercedes-AMG GT3 Evo	37	Crash
DNF	SP9 Pro	63	(China) Hankook FFF Racing Team	(Italy) Giacomo Altoè (Italy) Mirko Bortolotti (Italy) Marco Mapelli (France) Franck Perera	Lamborghini Huracán GT3 Evo	31	Crash damage
DNF	SP3	125	(Germany) Automobilclub von Deutschland	(Germany) Olaf Beckmann (Germany) Peter Hass (Germany) Jürgen Schulten (Germany) Volker Strycek	Opel Manta (Flying Fox) GT	29	Suspension
NC	SP4	105	(Germany) RaceWerk Motorsports UG	(Germany) Sebastian Schemmann (Germany) Christian Schotte (Germany) Serge van Vooren	BMW 325i	27	+32 laps
DNF	SP9 Pro	30	(Germany) Frikadelli Racing Team	(New Zealand) Earl Bamber (Australia) Matthew Campbell (France) Mathieu Jaminet (United Kingdom) Nick Tandy	Porsche 911 GT3 R	26	
DNF	V5	141	(Germany) Adrenalin Motorsport Team Alzner Automotive	(Germany) Daniel Korn (Germany) Tobias Korn (Germany) Ulrich Korn (Germany) Herbert von Danwitz	Porsche Cayman	23	
DNF	Cup 3	306	(Germany) G-Tech Competition	(Netherlands) Tom Coronel (Germany) Alexander Kroker (Germany) Maximilian Kurz (Netherlands) Jan Jaap van Roon	Porsche Cayman GT4 Clubsport MR	22	Crash
DNF	SP7	68	(United States) Krohn Racing	(Germany) Mario Farnbacher (Netherlands) Patrick Huisman (Sweden) Niclas Jönsson (United States) Tracy Krohn	Porsche 991 GT3 I Cup	21	
DNF	TCR	173	(Germany) mathilda racing	(Spain) Mikel Azcona (Germany) Joachim Nett (Germany) Jürgen Nett (Germany) Michael Paatz	Cupra León TCR	21	
DNF	SP4T	87	(Germany) Team Mathol Racing	(Germany) Stefan Branner (Germany) Andreas Schaflitzl (Germany) Ernst Thriene	Porsche 718 Cayman GT4 Clubsport	18	Crash
DNF	SP9	15	(Germany) Audi Sport Team Phoenix	(Italy) Mattia Drudi (Netherlands) Robin Frijns (Germany) Frank Stippler (Belgium) Dries Vanthoor	Audi R8 LMS Evo	17	Crash damage
DNF	SP9	26	(Switzerland) Octane126 Serliana	(Germany) Björn Grossmann (Switzerland) Jonathan Hirschi (Germany) Luca Ludwig (Switzerland) Simon Trummer	Ferrari 488 GT3 Evo 2020	4	
DNF	SP-Pro	350	(Germany) Black Falcon Team IDENTICA	(Germany) Noah Nagelsdiek (Germany) Florian Neumann (Luxembourg) Carlos Rivas (Germany) Hendrik von Danwitz	Porsche 991 GT3 II Cup MR	3	Crash damage
DNF	SP7	69	(Germany) Clickversicherung.de Team	(Germany) Robin Chrzanowski (Germany) Kersten Jodexnis (Germany) Max Koch (New Zealand) Peter Scharmach	Porsche 991 GT3 II Cup MR	1	Fire
DNS	VT2	169	(Germany) Giti Tire Motorsport By WS Racing	(United Kingdom) James Breakell (Germany) Raphael Klingmann (Germany) Daniel Niermann (Germany) Ulrich Schmidt	BMW 328i Racing	0	Did Not Start

- Entries in **bold** are class winners.
- Drivers in italics were entered in cars that completed the race, however did not complete the required two laps to be classified as a finisher.

== Bibliography ==
- Jörg-Richard Ufer & Tim Upietz. 24 Stunden Nürburgring Nordschleife 2021. Gruppe C Motorsport Verlag. ISBN 978-3-948501-12-9.
