= 2026 992 Endurance Cup =

Endurance sports car race

Race details
Date	4–5 September 2026
Official name	Michelin 992 Endurance Cup powered by Porsche Motorsport
Location	Spa-Francorchamps, Wallonia, Belgium
Course	Permanent circuit 7.004 km (4.352 mi)
Distance	Race; 12 hours

The 2026 992 Endurance Cup (known for sponsorship reasons as the Michelin 992 Endurance Cup powered by Porsche Motorsport) will be the third edition of the non-championship event held at Circuit de Spa-Francorchamps for Porsche 992 GT3 Cup cars.

== Schedule ==
Date	Time (local: CEST)	Session	Duration
4 September	10:10 – 11:40	Free Practice	90 Minutes
4 September	14:15 – 14:30	Qualifying Session 1	15 Minutes
4 September	14:40 – 14:55	Qualifying Session 2	15 Minutes
4 September	15:05 – 15:20	Qualifying Session 3	15 Minutes
4 September	16:30 – 16:55	Top 5 Shoot-Out	25 Minutes
4 September	20:50 – 21:50	Night Practice	60 Minutes
5 September	09:45 – 21:45	Race	12 Hours

== Entry list ==
All cars starts with the Porsche 911 GT3 Cup (992 I).

No.	Entrant	Class	Driver 1	Driver 2	Driver 3	Driver 4
9	(Netherlands) Red Camel-Jordans.nl	P	(Netherlands) Ivo Breukers	(Netherlands) Luc Breukers	(Netherlands) Rik Breukers	(Switzerland) Fabian Danz
17	(Portugal) AF Motorsport	PA	(Portugal) Andre Fernandes	(Venezuela) Angelo Fontana	(Luxembourg) Dylan Pereira	(Venezuela) Christian Potolicchio
21	(Belgium) Mühlner Motorsport	PA	(France) Joshua Bednarski	(Denmark) Conrad Tox Leveau	(El Salvador) Rolando Saca	
22	(Estonia) Theeba Motorsport by Quanloop EST1 Racing	AS	(Saudi Arabia) Ali Al Juffali	(Saudi Arabia) Reema Juffali	(Netherlands) Paul Meijer	
23	(Belgium) MM Racing	AS	(Belgium) Mick Meurrens	(Belgium) Tom Meurrens	(Belgium) Steve Meurrens	
78	(Belgium) Speed Lover	AB	(Belgium) Kurt Hensen	(Belgium) Gary Terclavers	(Belgium) Nick Hunter	
911	(Portugal) LMR Motorsport	AB	(Portugal) Leandro Martins	(Austria) Dieter Svepes	(Brazil) André Marques	
920	(France) Chazel Technologie Course	AS	(France) Jean-Mathieu Leandri	(France) Marc Guillot	(France) Gilles Colombani	(France) Paul Trojani
992	(Germany) HRT Performance	AB	(Australia) Seth Gilmore	(United Kingdom) Steven Gambrell	(Italy) Massimo Vignali	(Japan) Tadao Uematsu

Icon	Class
P	Pro
PA	Pro/Am
AS	Am-Silver
AB	Am-Bronze

== Practice ==
- Only the top 3 is shown.

Free Practice	Place	No.	Entrant	Time
Free Practice	1st	22	(Estonia) Theeba Motorsport by Quanloop EST1 Racing	2:20.627
Free Practice	2nd	920	(France) Chazel Technologie Course	2:22.985
Free Practice	3rd	21	(Belgium) Mühlner Motorsport	2:23.656
Night Practice	1st	9	(Netherlands) Red Camel-Jordans.nl	2:41.357
Night Practice	2nd	17	(Portugal) AF Motorsport	2:41.977
Night Practice	3rd	22	(Estonia) Theeba Motorsport by Quanloop EST1 Racing	2:42.149

== Qualifying ==
=== Qualifying results ===
Pole positions in each class are indicated in bold.

Pos.	Class	No.	Team	Avg
1	**Pro**	**9**	**(Netherlands) Red Camel-Jordans.nl**	**2:22.117**
2	**Pro/AM**	**17**	**(Portugal) AF Motorsport**	**2:22.800**
3	Pro	21	(Belgium) Mühlner Motorsport	2:23.664
4	**AM-Silver**	**920**	**(France) Chazel Technologie Course**	**2:24.183**
5	**AM-Bronze**	**911**	**(Portugal) LMR Motorsport**	**2:25.697**
6	AM-Bronze	78	(Belgium) Speed Lover	2:26.239
7	Am-Bronze	992	(Germany) HRT Performance	2:26.936
-	Am-Silver	22	(Estonia) Theeba Motorsport by Quanloop EST1 Racing	No time
-	Am-Silver	23	(Belgium) MM Racing	No time

=== Top 5 Shoot-Out ===
A top-10 shout-out was originally planned, but due to the small field, it was changed to a top-5 shout-out the day before. AF Motorsport set the fastest lap, but their lap time was deleted, so Mühlner Motorsport was declared the new pole-sitter.

Pos.	Class	No.	Team	Avg
1	Pro	21	(Belgium) Mühlner Motorsport	2:21.627
2	AM-Bronze	911	(Portugal) LMR Motorsport	2:21.674
3	AM-Silver	920	(France) Chazel Technologie Course	2:22.197
4	Pro/AM	17	(Portugal) AF Motorsport	Lap time deleted
5	Pro	9	(Netherlands) Red Camel-Jordans.nl	No time because of Track Limits

== Race ==
=== Race results ===
Source:
