= 2025 992 Endurance Cup =

Endurance sports car race

Race details
Date	5–6 September 2025
Official name	Michelin 992 Endurance Cup powered by Porsche Motorsport
Location	Spa-Francorchamps, Wallonia, Belgium
Course	Permanent circuit 7.004 km (4.352 mi)
Distance	Race; 12 hours
- Qualifying

Pole
Drivers	(Japan) "Bankcy" (Japan) Kiyoto Fujinami (United Kingdom) Harry King (Japan) Taichi Watarai	Team Parker Racing
Time	2:18.618
- Race

Fastest Lap
Driver	(Netherlands) Paul Meijer	MDM Motorsport
Time	2:20.386

Podium
First	(Germany) Tobias Müller (Luxembourg) Dylan Pereira (Italy) Gabriele Piana (Luxembourg) Carlos Rivas	48 LOSCH Motorsport by BLACK FALCON
Second	(Netherlands) Ivo Breukers (Netherlands) Luc Breukers (Netherlands) Rik Breukers (Switzerland) Fabian Danz	Red Camel-Jordans.nl
Third	(Netherlands) Glenn van Berlo (Netherlands) Marcel Van Berlo (Netherlands) Bart van Helden	Van Berlo Motorsport by Bas Koeten Racing

The 2025 992 Endurance Cup (known for sponsorship reasons as the Michelin 992 Endurance Cup powered by Porsche Motorsport) was the second edition of the non-championship event held at Circuit de Spa-Francorchamps for Porsche 992 GT3 Cup cars.

== Schedule ==
Date	Time (local: CEST)	Event	Duration
5 September	10:45 - 12:15	Free Practice	90 Minutes
5 September	15:25 - 16:30	Qualifying	3x15 Minutes
5 September	17:40 - 18:05	Top 10 Shoot-Out	25 Minutes
5 September	20:50 - 21:50	Night Practice	60 Minutes
6 September	9:45 - 21:45	Race	12 Hours

== Entry list ==
The entry list was revealed on September 5, 2025, and featured 25 Porsche 992 GT3 Cup cars: 6 in Pro, 3 in Pro/Am, 11 in Am-Silver and 5 in the Am-Bronze class.

No.	Entrant	Class	Driver 1	Driver 2	Driver 3	Driver 4
3	(Netherlands) Bas Koeten Racing	AS	(Germany) Colin Bönighausen	(Canada) Marco Cirone	(Dominican Republic) Jimmy Llibre	(Switzerland) Pedro Torres
7	(Estonia) EST1 Racing	P	(Venezuela) Angelo Fontana	(Sweden) Robin Knutsson	(Estonia) Alex Reimann	
9	(Netherlands) Red Camel-Jordans.nl	P	(Netherlands) Ivo Breukers	(Netherlands) Luc Breukers	(Netherlands) Rik Breukers	(Switzerland) Fabian Danz
14	(Netherlands) Team GP-Elite	AS	(Netherlands) Koen Munnichs	(Netherlands) Peter Munnichs	(Netherlands) Charles Zwolsman	
17	(Italy) Fulgenzi Racing	AS	(Belgium) Fabian Duffieux	(United Kingdom) Harley Haughton	(Italy) Andrea Girondi	
20	(Netherlands) Bas Koeten Racing	AS	(Dominican Republic) Jimmy Llibre	(United States) Alex Pratt	(United States) Marc Sharinn	(United States) Tyler Sharinn
21	(Belgium) Mühlner Motorsport	AS	(Belgium) Dylan Derdaele	(United States) David Ducote	(Belgium) Philippe Wils	
23	(Germany) Team Laptime Performance	AS	(Canada) Maxwell Polzler	(Germany) Nick Salewsky	(United States) Kevin Stadtlander	
24	(Belgium) Red Ant Racing	AS	(Belgium) Simon Balcaen	(Belgium) Mathieu Castelein	(France) Steven Palette	
25	(Netherlands) Van Berlo Motorsport by Bas Koeten Racing	PA	(Netherlands) Glenn van Berlo	(Netherlands) Marcel Van Berlo	(Netherlands) Bart van Helden	
30	(Germany) HRT Performance	P	(United Kingdom) Hugo Ellis	(Germany) Sebastian Freymuth	(United Kingdom) Steven Gambrell	(Colombia) Pedro Juan Moreno
35	(Netherlands) Hans Weijs Motorsport	AB	(Netherlands) Mark van Eldik	(Netherlands) Edwin Schilt	(Netherlands) Hans Weijs	
48	(Luxembourg) 48 LOSCH Motorsport by BLACK FALCON	P	(Germany) Tobias Müller	(Luxembourg) Dylan Pereira	(Italy) Gabriele Piana	(Luxembourg) Carlos Rivas
56	(Belgium) Q1 Trackracing	AB	(Australia) Darren Currie	(Australia) Adrian Flack	(Australia) Danny Stutterd	
78	(Belgium) Speed Lover	PA	(United States) Dominique Bastien	(Netherlands) Jaxon Verhoeven	(United Kingdom) Joe Warhurst	(Belgium) John de Wilde
88	(Belgium) Q1 Trackracing	AS	(Hong Kong) Eric Kwong	(Hong Kong) Henry Kwong	(China) Dylan Yip	(China) Jinlong Bao
100	(Brazil) DENER MOTORSPORT by BLACK FALCON	AB	(Brazil) Francisco Villela Pedroso Horta	(Brazil) Nelson Monteiro Junior	(Brazil) Vinicius Quadros	(Brazil) Rouman Ziemkiewicz
121	(Germany) BLACK FALCON	AB	(Brazil) João Barbosa	(Brazil) William Freire	(Brazil) João Gonçalves	
123	(Brazil) DENER MOTORSPORT by BLACK FALCON	AB	(Brazil) Nelson Monteiro Junior	(Brazil) Israel Fernandes Salmen	(Brazil) Leonardo Sanchez	(Brazil) Luis Gustavo Barboza Zanon
127	(Luxembourg) MDM Motorsport	PA	(Netherlands) Tom Coronel	(Netherlands) Paul Meijer	(Netherlands) Jan Jaap van Roon	(Netherlands) Hans Weijs
333	(Lithuania) Dream 2 Drive	P	(Estonia) Gregor Jeets	(Estonia) Markus Kajak	(Lithuania) Kajus Siksnelis	(Lithuania) Tauras Tunyla
666	(United Kingdom) Team Parker Racing	P	(Japan) "Bankcy"	(Japan) Kiyoto Fujinami	(United Kingdom) Harry King	(Japan) Taichi Watarai
888	(France) SebLajoux Racing	AS	(France) Marc Guillot	(France) Sebastien Lajoux	(France) Stephane Perrin	(France) Louis Perrot
911	(Germany) 9und11 Racing	AS	(Germany) Georg Goder	(Germany) Ralf Oehme	(Germany) Tim Scheerbarth	(Germany) Martin Schlüter
992	(Germany) PTE operated by Manthey	AS	(Qatar) Ahmed Al-Emadi	(Finland) Jukka Honkavuori	(Brazil) Eric Santos	(Germany) Lucas Wolf

Icon	Class
P	Pro
PA	Pro/Am
AS	Am-Silver
AB	Am-Bronze

== Practice ==
- Only the top 3 is shown.

Free Practice	Place	No.	Entrant	Time
Free Practice	1st	127	(Luxembourg) MDM Motorsport	2:19.603
Free Practice	2nd	666	(United Kingdom) Team Parker Racing	2:19.716
Free Practice	3rd	48	(Luxembourg) 48 LOSCH Motorsport by BLACK FALCON	2:19.758
Night Practice	1st	48	(Luxembourg) 48 LOSCH Motorsport by BLACK FALCON	2:21.672
Night Practice	2nd	127	(Luxembourg) MDM Motorsport	2:21.718
Night Practice	3rd	992	(Germany) PTE operated by Manthey Racing	2:22.042

== Qualifying ==
=== Qualifying results ===
Pole positions in each class are indicated in bold.

Pos.	Class	No.	Team	Avg
1	**Pro**	**666**	**(United Kingdom) Team Parker Racing**	**2:25.438**
2	Pro	48	(Luxembourg) 48 LOSCH Motorsport by BLACK FALCON	2:25.538
3	Pro	9	(Netherlands) Red Camel-Jordans.nl	2:26.259
4	**Pro/Am**	**127**	**(Luxembourg) MDM Motorsport**	**2:26.549**
5	Pro	333	(Lithuania) Dream 2 Drive	2:26.883
6	Pro	30	(Germany) HRT Performance	2:27.040
7	**Am-Slver**	**888**	**(France) SebLajoux Racing**	**2:27.106**
8	Am-Slver	992	(Germany) PTE operated by Manthey	2:27.131
9	Am-Slver	24	(Belgium) Red Ant Racing	2:27.260
10	Am-Slver	17	(Italy) Fulgenzi Racing	2:27.281
11	Pro	7	(Estonia) EST1 Racing	2:27.616
12	Am-Slver	3	(Netherlands) Bas Koeten Racing	2:28.008
13	Pro/Am	25	(Netherlands) Van Berlo Motorsport by Bas Koeten Racing	2:28.133
14	Pro/Am	78	(Belgium) Speed Lover	2:28.188
15	Am-Slver	88	(Belgium) Q1 Trackracing	2:28.197
16	Am-Slver	14	(Netherlands) Team GP-Elite	2:29.084
17	**Am-Bronze**	**56**	**(Belgium) Q1 Trackracing**	**2:29.316**
18	Am-Slver	20	(Netherlands) Bas Koeten Racing	2:30.541
19	Am-Bronze	123	(Brazil) DENER MOTORSPORT by BLACK FALCON	2:30.605
20	Am-Slver	911	(Germany) 9und11 Racing	2:30.828
21	Am-Slver	21	(Belgium) Mühlner Motorsport	2:31.168
22	Am-Bronze	35	(Netherlands) Hans Weijs Motorsport	2:31.674
23	Am-Bronze	100	(Brazil) DENER MOTORSPORT by BLACK FALCON	2:33.127
24	Am-Slver	23	(Germany) Team Laptime Performance	2:34.067
25	Am-Bronze	121	(Germany) BLACK FALCON	No time established

=== Top 10 Shoot-Out ===
Pole positions in each class are indicated in bold.

Pos.	Class	No.	Team	Time
1	**Pro**	**666**	**(United Kingdom) Team Parker Racing**	**2:18.618**
2	**Pro/Am**	**127**	**(Luxembourg) MDM Motorsport**	**2:18.773**
3	Pro	48	(Luxembourg) 48 LOSCH Motorsport by BLACK FALCON	2:19.608
4	Pro	333	(Lithuania) Dream 2 Drive	2:20.625
5	Pro	30	(Germany) HRT Performance	2:20.915
6	**Am-Slver**	**888**	**(France) SebLajoux Racing**	**2:21.046**
7	Am-Slver	992	(Germany) PTE operated by Manthey	2:21.151
8	Am-Slver	17	(Italy) Fulgenzi Racing	No time established
9	Am-Slver	24	(Belgium) Red Ant Racing	No time established
10	Pro	9	(Netherlands) Red Camel-Jordans.nl	No time established

== Race ==
The race was won by the No. 48 48 LOSCH Motorsport by BLACK FALCON driven by Tobias Müller, Gabriele Piana, Dylan Pereira and Carlos Rivas.

=== Race results ===
Class winners are in bold.

Pos	Class	No	Team	Drivers	Car	Laps	Time/Reason
Pos	Class	No	Team	Drivers	Engine	Laps	Time/Reason
1	**Pro**	**48**	**(Luxembourg) 48 LOSCH Motorsport by BLACK FALCON**	**(Germany) Tobias Müller** **(Luxembourg) Dylan Pereira** **(Italy) Gabriele Piana** **(Luxembourg) Carlos Rivas**	**Porsche 992 GT3 Cup**	**280**	**12:01:30.086**
1	**Pro**	**48**	**(Luxembourg) 48 LOSCH Motorsport by BLACK FALCON**	**(Germany) Tobias Müller** **(Luxembourg) Dylan Pereira** **(Italy) Gabriele Piana** **(Luxembourg) Carlos Rivas**	**Porsche 4.0 L Flat-6**	**280**	**12:01:30.086**
2	Pro	9	(Netherlands) Red Camel-Jordans.nl	(Netherlands) Ivo Breukers (Netherlands) Luc Breukers (Netherlands) Rik Breukers (Switzerland) Fabian Danz	Porsche 992 GT3 Cup	280	+1:50.788
2	Pro	9	(Netherlands) Red Camel-Jordans.nl	(Netherlands) Ivo Breukers (Netherlands) Luc Breukers (Netherlands) Rik Breukers (Switzerland) Fabian Danz	Porsche 4.0 L Flat-6	280	+1:50.788
3	**Pro/Am**	**25**	**(Netherlands) Van Berlo Motorsport by Bas Koeten Racing**	**(Netherlands) Glenn van Berlo** **(Netherlands) Marcel Van Berlo** **(Netherlands) Bart van Helden**	**Porsche 992 GT3 Cup**	**279**	**+1 Lap**
3	**Pro/Am**	**25**	**(Netherlands) Van Berlo Motorsport by Bas Koeten Racing**	**(Netherlands) Glenn van Berlo** **(Netherlands) Marcel Van Berlo** **(Netherlands) Bart van Helden**	**Porsche 4.0 L Flat-6**	**279**	**+1 Lap**
4	Pro	30	(Germany) HRT Performance	(United Kingdom) Hugo Ellis (Germany) Sebastian Freymuth (United Kingdom) Steven Gambrell (Colombia) Pedro Juan Moreno	Porsche 992 GT3 Cup	279	+1 Lap
4	Pro	30	(Germany) HRT Performance	(United Kingdom) Hugo Ellis (Germany) Sebastian Freymuth (United Kingdom) Steven Gambrell (Colombia) Pedro Juan Moreno	Porsche 4.0 L Flat-6	279	+1 Lap
5	**Am-Silver**	**888**	**(France) SebLajoux Racing**	**(France) Marc Guillot** **(France) Sebastien Lajoux** **(France) Stephane Perrin** **(France) Louis Perrot**	**Porsche 992 GT3 Cup**	**278**	**+2 Laps**
5	**Am-Silver**	**888**	**(France) SebLajoux Racing**	**(France) Marc Guillot** **(France) Sebastien Lajoux** **(France) Stephane Perrin** **(France) Louis Perrot**	**Porsche 4.0 L Flat-6**	**278**	**+2 Laps**
6	Pro	7	(Estonia) EST1 Racing	(Venezuela) Angelo Fontana (Sweden) Robin Knutsson (Estonia) Alex Reimann	Porsche 992 GT3 Cup	278	+2 Laps
6	Pro	7	(Estonia) EST1 Racing	(Venezuela) Angelo Fontana (Sweden) Robin Knutsson (Estonia) Alex Reimann	Porsche 4.0 L Flat-6	278	+2 Laps
7	Pro	666	(United Kingdom) Team Parker Racing	(Japan) "Bankcy" (Japan) Kiyoto Fujinami (United Kingdom) Harry King (Japan) Taichi Watarai	Porsche 992 GT3 Cup	278	+2 Laps
7	Pro	666	(United Kingdom) Team Parker Racing	(Japan) "Bankcy" (Japan) Kiyoto Fujinami (United Kingdom) Harry King (Japan) Taichi Watarai	Porsche 4.0 L Flat-6	278	+2 Laps
8	Am-Silver	992	(Germany) PTE operated by Manthey	(Qatar) Ahmed Al-Emadi (Finland) Jukka Honkavuori (Brazil) Eric Santos (Germany) Lucas Wolf	Porsche 992 GT3 Cup	277	+3 Laps
8	Am-Silver	992	(Germany) PTE operated by Manthey	(Qatar) Ahmed Al-Emadi (Finland) Jukka Honkavuori (Brazil) Eric Santos (Germany) Lucas Wolf	Porsche 4.0 L Flat-6	277	+3 Laps
9	Pro	333	(Lithuania) Dream 2 Drive	(Estonia) Gregor Jeets (Estonia) Markus Kajak (Lithuania) Kajus Siksnelis (Lithuania) Tauras Tunyla	Porsche 992 GT3 Cup	277	+3 Laps
9	Pro	333	(Lithuania) Dream 2 Drive	(Estonia) Gregor Jeets (Estonia) Markus Kajak (Lithuania) Kajus Siksnelis (Lithuania) Tauras Tunyla	Porsche 4.0 L Flat-6	277	+3 Laps
10	Am-Silver	14	(Netherlands) Team GP-Elite	(Netherlands) Koen Munnichs (Netherlands) Peter Munnichs (Netherlands) Charles Zwolsman	Porsche 992 GT3 Cup	276	+4 Laps
10	Am-Silver	14	(Netherlands) Team GP-Elite	(Netherlands) Koen Munnichs (Netherlands) Peter Munnichs (Netherlands) Charles Zwolsman	Porsche 4.0 L Flat-6	276	+4 Laps
11	**Am-Bronze**	**121**	**(Germany) BLACK FALCON**	**(Brazil) João Barbosa** **(Brazil) William Freire** **(Brazil) João Gonçalves**	**Porsche 992 GT3 Cup**	**276**	**+4 Laps**
11	**Am-Bronze**	**121**	**(Germany) BLACK FALCON**	**(Brazil) João Barbosa** **(Brazil) William Freire** **(Brazil) João Gonçalves**	**Porsche 4.0 L Flat-6**	**276**	**+4 Laps**
12	Am-Silver	17	(Italy) Fulgenzi Racing	(Belgium) Fabian Duffieux (United Kingdom) Harley Haughton (Italy) Andrea Girondi	Porsche 992 GT3 Cup	276	+4 Laps
12	Am-Silver	17	(Italy) Fulgenzi Racing	(Belgium) Fabian Duffieux (United Kingdom) Harley Haughton (Italy) Andrea Girondi	Porsche 4.0 L Flat-6	276	+4 Laps
13	Am-Silver	24	(Belgium) Red Ant Racing	(Belgium) Simon Balcaen (Belgium) Mathieu Castelein (France) Steven Palette	Porsche 992 GT3 Cup	275	+5 Laps
13	Am-Silver	24	(Belgium) Red Ant Racing	(Belgium) Simon Balcaen (Belgium) Mathieu Castelein (France) Steven Palette	Porsche 4.0 L Flat-6	275	+5 Laps
14	Am-Bronze	123	(Brazil) DENER MOTORSPORT by BLACK FALCON	(Brazil) Nelson Monteiro Junior (Brazil) Israel Fernandes Salmen (Brazil) Leonardo Sanchez (Brazil) Luis Gustavo Barboza Zanon	Porsche 992 GT3 Cup	274	+6 Laps
14	Am-Bronze	123	(Brazil) DENER MOTORSPORT by BLACK FALCON	(Brazil) Nelson Monteiro Junior (Brazil) Israel Fernandes Salmen (Brazil) Leonardo Sanchez (Brazil) Luis Gustavo Barboza Zanon	Porsche 4.0 L Flat-6	274	+6 Laps
15	Am-Silver	88	(Belgium) Q1 Trackracing	(Hong Kong) Eric Kwong (Hong Kong) Henry Kwong (China) Dylan Yip (China) Jinlong Bao	Porsche 992 GT3 Cup	273	+7 Laps
15	Am-Silver	88	(Belgium) Q1 Trackracing	(Hong Kong) Eric Kwong (Hong Kong) Henry Kwong (China) Dylan Yip (China) Jinlong Bao	Porsche 4.0 L Flat-6	273	+7 Laps
16	Am-Bronze	56	(Belgium) Q1 Trackracing	(Australia) Darren Currie (Australia) Adrian Flack (Australia) Danny Stutterd	Porsche 992 GT3 Cup	272	+8 Laps
16	Am-Bronze	56	(Belgium) Q1 Trackracing	(Australia) Darren Currie (Australia) Adrian Flack (Australia) Danny Stutterd	Porsche 4.0 L Flat-6	272	+8 Laps
17	Am-Silver	911	(Germany) 9und11 Racing	(Germany) Georg Goder (Germany) Ralf Oehme (Germany) Tim Scheerbarth (Germany) Martin Schlüter	Porsche 992 GT3 Cup	269	+11 Laps
17	Am-Silver	911	(Germany) 9und11 Racing	(Germany) Georg Goder (Germany) Ralf Oehme (Germany) Tim Scheerbarth (Germany) Martin Schlüter	Porsche 4.0 L Flat-6	269	+11 Laps
18	Am-Silver	23	(Germany) Team Laptime Performance	(Canada) Maxwell Polzler (Germany) Nick Salewsky (United States) Kevin Stadtlander	Porsche 992 GT3 Cup	267	+13 Laps
18	Am-Silver	23	(Germany) Team Laptime Performance	(Canada) Maxwell Polzler (Germany) Nick Salewsky (United States) Kevin Stadtlander	Porsche 4.0 L Flat-6	267	+13 Laps
19	Am-Silver	3	(Netherlands) Bas Koeten Racing	(Germany) Colin Bönighausen (Canada) Marco Cirone (Dominican Republic) Jimmy Llibre (Switzerland) Pedro Torres	Porsche 992 GT3 Cup	262	+18 Laps
19	Am-Silver	3	(Netherlands) Bas Koeten Racing	(Germany) Colin Bönighausen (Canada) Marco Cirone (Dominican Republic) Jimmy Llibre (Switzerland) Pedro Torres	Porsche 4.0 L Flat-6	262	+18 Laps
20	Am-Silver	20	(Netherlands) Bas Koeten Racing	(Dominican Republic) Jimmy Llibre (United States) Alex Pratt (United States) Marc Sharinn (United States) Tyler Sharinn	Porsche 992 GT3 Cup	260	+20 Laps
20	Am-Silver	20	(Netherlands) Bas Koeten Racing	(Dominican Republic) Jimmy Llibre (United States) Alex Pratt (United States) Marc Sharinn (United States) Tyler Sharinn	Porsche 4.0 L Flat-6	260	+20 Laps
21	Pro/Am	78	(Belgium) Speed Lover	(United States) Dominique Bastien (Netherlands) Jaxon Verhoeven (United Kingdom) Joe Warhurst (Belgium) John de Wilde	Porsche 992 GT3 Cup	255	+25 Laps
21	Pro/Am	78	(Belgium) Speed Lover	(United States) Dominique Bastien (Netherlands) Jaxon Verhoeven (United Kingdom) Joe Warhurst (Belgium) John de Wilde	Porsche 4.0 L Flat-6	255	+25 Laps
22	Am-Bronze	35	(Netherlands) Hans Weijs Motorsport	(Netherlands) Mark van Eldik (Netherlands) Edwin Schilt (Netherlands) Hans Weijs	Porsche 992 GT3 Cup	248	+32 Laps
22	Am-Bronze	35	(Netherlands) Hans Weijs Motorsport	(Netherlands) Mark van Eldik (Netherlands) Edwin Schilt (Netherlands) Hans Weijs	Porsche 4.0 L Flat-6	248	+32 Laps
23	Pro/Am	127	(Luxembourg) MDM Motorsport	(Netherlands) Tom Coronel (Netherlands) Paul Meijer (Netherlands) Jan Jaap van Roon (Netherlands) Hans Weijs	Porsche 992 GT3 Cup	229	+51 Laps
23	Pro/Am	127	(Luxembourg) MDM Motorsport	(Netherlands) Tom Coronel (Netherlands) Paul Meijer (Netherlands) Jan Jaap van Roon (Netherlands) Hans Weijs	Porsche 4.0 L Flat-6	229	+51 Laps
24 DNF	Am-Bronze	100	(Brazil) DENER MOTORSPORT by BLACK FALCON	(Brazil) Francisco Villela Pedroso Horta (Brazil) Nelson Monteiro Junior (Brazil) Vinicius Quadros (Brazil) Rouman Ziemkiewicz	Porsche 992 GT3 Cup	174	+106 Laps
24 DNF	Am-Bronze	100	(Brazil) DENER MOTORSPORT by BLACK FALCON	(Brazil) Francisco Villela Pedroso Horta (Brazil) Nelson Monteiro Junior (Brazil) Vinicius Quadros (Brazil) Rouman Ziemkiewicz	Porsche 4.0 L Flat-6	174	+106 Laps
DNF	Am-Silver	21	(Belgium) Mühlner Motorsport	(Belgium) Dylan Derdaele (United States) David Ducote (Belgium) Philippe Wils	Porsche 992 GT3 Cup	65	Did not finish
DNF	Am-Silver	21	(Belgium) Mühlner Motorsport	(Belgium) Dylan Derdaele (United States) David Ducote (Belgium) Philippe Wils	Porsche 4.0 L Flat-6	65	Did not finish
