= 2017 24 Hours of Nürburgring =

Endurance motor race in Germany

Nürburgring 24h track (Nordschleife+GP Circuit without Mercedes-Arena)

The 2017 ADAC Zurich 24 Hours of Nürburgring was the 45th running of the 24 Hours of Nürburgring. It took place over 25-28 May 2017.

The #29 Audi Sport Team Land / Land-Motorsport team won the race in an Audi R8 LMS.

== Race results ==
Class winners in bold.

Pos	Class	No.	Team	Drivers	Vehicle	Laps
1	**SP9**	**29**	**(Germany) Audi Sport Team Land / Land-Motorsport**	**(United States) Connor De Phillippi (Germany) Christopher Mies (South Africa) Kelvin van der Linde (Germany) Markus Winkelhock**	**Audi R8 LMS**	**158**
2	SP9	98	(Germany) Rowe Racing	(Finland) Markus Palttala (Netherlands) Nick Catsburg (United Kingdom) Alexander Sims (United Kingdom) Richard Westbrook	BMW M6 GT3	158
3	SP9	9	(Belgium) Audi Sport Team WRT	(Switzerland) Nico Müller (Switzerland) Marcel Fässler (Netherlands) Robin Frijns (Germany) René Rast	Audi R8 LMS	158
4	SP9	42	(Germany) BMW Team Schnitzer	(Germany) Marco Wittmann (United Kingdom) Tom Blomqvist (Germany) Martin Tomczyk (Brazil) Augusto Farfus	BMW M6 GT3	158
5	SP9	1	(Germany) Mercedes-AMG Team Black Falcon	(Germany) Maro Engel (United Kingdom) Adam Christodoulou (Netherlands) Yelmer Buurman (Germany) Manuel Metzger	Mercedes-AMG GT3	158
6	SP9	31	(Germany) Frikadelli Racing	(Austria) Norbert Siedler (Denmark) Michael Christensen (Austria) Klaus Bachler (Germany) Lucas Luhr	Porsche 991 GT3 R	157
7	SP9	22	(Germany) Wochenspiegel Team Monschau	(Germany) Georg Weiss (Germany) Oliver Kainz (Germany) Daniel Keilwitz (Germany) Jochen Krumbach	Ferrari 488 GT3	157
8	SP9	33	(Germany) Falken Motorsports	(United Kingdom) Peter Dumbreck (Switzerland) Alexandre Imperatori (Netherlands) Stef Dusseldorp (Germany) Marco Seefried	BMW M6 GT3	157
9	SP9	8	(Germany) Haribo Racing Team Mercedes-AMG	(Germany) Lance David Arnold (Netherlands) Renger van der Zande (Germany) Maximilian Götz	Mercedes-AMG GT3	157
10	SP9	99	(Germany) Rowe Racing	(Austria) Philipp Eng (Belgium) Maxime Martin (Germany) Marc Basseng	BMW M6 GT3	157
11	SP9	20	(Germany) Schubert Motorsport	(Finland) Jesse Krohn (Germany) Jörg Müller (Canada) Bruno Spengler (Canada) Kuno Wittmer	BMW M6 GT3	157
12	SP9	19	(Germany) Schubert Motorsport	(Germany) Jens Klingmann (United States) John Edwards (United Kingdom) Tom Onslow-Cole	BMW M6 GT3	156
13	SP9	4	(Germany) Black Falcon	(Saudi Arabia) Abdulaziz Bin Turki Al Faisal (Germany) Hubert Haupt (Germany) Luca Stolz (Spain) Daniel Juncadella	Mercedes-AMG GT3	156
14	SP9	48	(Germany) Mann-Filter Team HTP Motorsport	(Germany) Kenneth Heyer (Germany) Bernd Schneider (Netherlands) Indy Dontje (Germany) Patrick Assenheimer	Mercedes-AMG GT3	155
15	**SP9 LG**	**37**	**(Germany) Bentley Team Abt**	**(Germany) Christopher Brück (Germany) Christer Jöns (Germany) Christian Menzel (Belgium) Nico Verdonck**	**Bentley Continental GT3**	**155**
16	SP9	30	(Germany) Frikadelli Racing	(Germany) Klaus Abbelen (Germany) Sabine Schmitz (Germany) Andreas Ziegler (Germany) Alex Müller	Porsche 991 GT3 R	152
17	SP9 LG	102	(Germany) Walkenhorst Motorsport	(Germany) Peter Posavac (Germany) Alex Lambertz (Netherlands) Jaap van Lagen (Germany) Tobias Schulze	BMW Z4 GT3	151
18	SP9	5	(Germany) Phoenix Racing	(Germany) Frank Stippler (Germany) Mike Rockenfeller (Germany) Dennis Busch (Denmark) Nicolaj Møller Madsen	Audi R8 LMS	149
19	**SP-X**	**702**	**(Switzerland) Traum Motorsport**	**(Germany) Felipe Fernández Laser (France) Franck Mailleux (Germany) Thomas Mutsch (Italy) Andrea Piccini**	**SCG 003C**	**148**
20	SP9 LG	36	(Germany) Bentley Team Abt	(United Kingdom) Steven Kane (United Kingdom) Guy Smith (Belgium) Maxime Soulet	Bentley Continental GT3	147
21	**SP8**	**7**	**(United Kingdom) Aston Martin Lagonda Ltd**	**(United Kingdom) Peter Cate (Germany) Markus Lungstrass (Denmark) Nicki Thiim (United Kingdom) Darren Turner**	**Aston Martin GT8**	**147**
22	**SP7**	**66**	**(Germany) Manthey Racing**	**(Germany) Stefan Aust (Germany) Christian Bollrath (Germany) Ralf Oeverhaus**	**Porsche 911 GT3 Cup MR**	**146**
23	SP9	3	(Germany) Mercedes-AMG Team Black Falcon	(Germany) Dirk Müller (Germany) Thomas Jäger (Germany) Maro Engel (Germany) Jan Seyffarth	Mercedes-AMG GT3	146
24	**SP3T**	**89**	**(Finland) LMS Engineering**	**(Germany) Ulrich Andree (Germany) Daniela Schmid (Germany) Christian Schmitz (Germany) Stefan Wieninger**	**Audi TT RS2**	**145**
25	SP3T	170	(Japan) Toyota Gazoo Racing	(Japan) Takato Iguchi (Japan) Takamitsu Matsui (Japan) Naoya Gamou (Japan) Hisashi Yabuki	Lexus RC	145
26	SP9	34	(Germany) Car Collection Motorsport	(Germany) Ronnie Saurenmann (Switzerland) Lorenzo Rocco (Germany) Klaus Koch (Germany) Jan-Erik Slooten	Audi R8 LMS	145
27	SP-X	150	(Germany) Manthey Racing	(Germany) Christoph Breuer (Germany) Moritz Oberheim (Germany) Lars Kern (Germany) Marc Hennerici	Porsche Cayman 981 GT4 CS	144
28	SP7	54		(United Kingdom) Willie Moore (United Kingdom) Bill Cameron (Germany) Peter Bonk	Porsche 991 Carrera Cup	143
29	**TCR**	**175**	**(Germany) mathilda racing**	**(Germany) Andreas Gülden (Austria) Constantin Kletzer (Germany) Benjamin Leuchter (Germany) Dennis Wüsthoff**	**VW Golf GTI TCR**	**142**
30	**Cup 3**	**307**	**(Germany) Teichmann Racing**	**(Germany) "Maximilian" (Luxembourg) Daniel Bohr (Germany) Fabio Grosse (Germany) Kim-Luis Schramm**	**Porsche Cayman 981 GT4 CS**	**142**
31	SP-X	18	(Germany) Audi Sport Team Phoenix	(Germany) Christian Abt (Switzerland) Rahel Frey (Netherlands) Patrick Huisman (Germany) Peter Terting	Audi R8 LMS GT4	142
32	SP7	62	(Germany) Gigaspeed Team GetSpeed Performance	(United States) Janine Hill (United States) John Shoffner (Germany) Arno Klasen (Netherlands) Duncan Huisman	Porsche 911 GT3 Cup (991)	141
33	**SP10**	**72**	**(Germany) Black Falcon Team TMD Friction**	**(United States) Carlos Gomez (Turkey) Mustafa Mehmet Kaya (Germany) Ronny Lethmate (Italy) Gabriele Piana**	**Porsche Cayman GT4**	**140**
34	Cup 3	308	(Germany) Teichmann Racing	(Germany) Jurgen von Gartzen (Germany) Moritz Gusenbauer (Germany) Markus Oestreich (Germany) Moritz Oestreich	Porsche Cayman 981 GT4 CS	140
35	Cup 3	304		(Germany) Thomas Herbst (Germany) Joachim Gunther (Germany) Jens Richter (Germany) Dirk Riebensahm	Porsche Cayman 981 GT4 CS	140
36	**SP8T**	**40**	**(Germany) Securtal Sorg Rennsport**	**(Germany) Dirk Adorf (United Kingdom) Jethro Bovingdon (United Kingdom) Ricky Collard (Germany) Jörg Weidinger**	**BMW M4 GT4**	**140**
37	Cup 3	309	(Germany) Arkenau Motorsport	(Germany) Ronja Assmann (Germany) Winfried Assmann (Germany) Kai Riemer (New Zealand) Peter Scharmach	Porsche Cayman 981 GT4 CS	139
38	SP-X	75	(Germany) Prosport Performance	(Germany) Jorg Viebahn (Germany) Andreas Patzelt (Germany) Peter Mamerow	Porsche Cayman	139
39	SP7	60	(Germany) Gigaspeed Team GetSpeed Performance	(Germany) Adam Osieka (Germany) "Max" (Germany) "Jens" (United States) Dennis Trebing	Porsche 911 GT3 Cup (991)	139
40	SP8	69	(Germany) Dörr Motorsport	(Germany) Ralf Goral (Germany) Philipp Wlazik (Germany) Florian Scholze (Germany) Uwe Wachtler	Lamborghini Huracan Super Trofeo	139
41	Cup 3	303	(Germany) Schmickler Performance	(Germany) Karsten Kramer (Germany) Albert Egbert (Germany) Tatjana Hanser (Germany) Heiko Tonges	Porsche Cayman 981 GT4 CS	139
42	SP8T	52	(Germany) Team Schirmer Pirelli Deutschland	(Germany) Philipp Goschel (Germany) Dierk Moller (Germany) Frank Weishar (Germany) Michael Funke	BMW M4	138
43	**Cup 5**	**249**	**(Germany) ADAC Team Weser Ems e.V.**	**(Germany) Marc Ehret (Germany) Patrick Hinte (Switzerland) Yannick Mettler (Germany) Michael Schrey**	**BMW M235i Racing**	**138**
44	Cup 3	305	(Germany) Esba Racing	(Germany) Patrick Steuer (Germany) Armin Baumann (Germany) Ulf Ehninger (Germany) Tim Neuser	Porsche Cayman 981 GT4 CS	138
45	SP3T	87	(Germany) MSC Sinzig e.V. im ADAC	(Germany) Rudi Speich (Germany) Roland Waschkau (Germany) Thorsten Jung (Germany) Dirk Vleugels	Audi TT	137
46	**AT**	**320**		**(Germany) Axel Duffner (Germany) Thomas von Löwis of Menar (Germany) Daniel Schellhaas**	**Porsche Cayman 981 GT4 CS**	**137**
47	Cup 5	240	(Germany) Pixum Team Adrenalin Motorsport	(Germany) Norbert Fischer (Germany) Christian Konnerth (Germany) Daniel Zils (Austria) David Griessner	BMW M235i Racing	136
48	TCR	172	(Germany) Bonk Motorsport	(Germany) Hermann Bock (Germany) Maximilian Partl (Germany) Rainer Partl	Audi RS3 LMS	136
49	**V6**	**133**	**(Germany) Black Falcon Team TMD Friction**	**(Saudi Arabia) Saud Al Faisal (Germany) Thomas Bolz (Germany) Fidel Leib (Germany) Aurel Schoeller**	**Porsche Carrera**	**135**
50	SP3T	92	(South Korea) Hyundai N	(Belgium) Vincent Radermecker (United Kingdom) Stuart Leonard (Germany) Christian Gebhardt (South Korea) Jae-Kyun Kim	Hyundai i30 N	135
51	Cup 5	246	(Germany) ADAC Team Weser Ems e.V.	(Germany) Markus Sedlmaier (Germany) Jens Moetefindt (Luxembourg) Yann Munhowen (Italy) Sergio Negroni	BMW M235i Racing	135
52	TCR	171	(Germany) Bonk Motorsport	(Germany) Michael Bonk (Germany) Volker Piepmeyer (Germany) Axel Burghardt (Germany) Andreas Montmann	Audi RS3 LMS	135
53	**V5**	**144**	**(Germany) Prosport Performance**	**(Germany) Marek Böckmann (Germany) Jürgen Nett (Belgium) Olivier Muytjens (Germany) Dominik Schoning**	**Porsche Cayman**	**134**
54	AT	106	(United Kingdom) Saxon Motorsport	(United Kingdom) Nick Barrow (United Kingdom) Clint Bardwell (United States) Jamie Morrow (United Kingdom) Martin Gibson	BMW 135D GTR	134
55	V5	152	(Germany) Pixum Team Adrenalin Motorsport	(Germany) Christian Bullesbach (Germany) Andreas Schettler (Spain) Carlos Arimon (Germany) Andre Duve	Porsche Cayman	133
56	**SP5**	**83**	**(Germany) Leutheuser Racing & Events**	**(France) Dominique Nury (Austria) Richard Purtscher (France) Fabrice Reicher (Germany) Harald Rettich**	**BMW 1M-Coupe**	**133**
57	Cup 3	312	(Germany) Team Mathol Racing e.V.	(Switzerland) Rudiger Schicht (Slovakia) Robert Zwinger (Germany) Henning Cramer (Germany) Oliver Louisoder	Porsche Cayman 981 GT4 CS	132
58	V6	137	(Germany) Mathol Racing e.V.	(Germany) Claudius Karch (Switzerland) Ivan Jacoma (Germany) Thorsten Wolter	Porsche Cayman S	131
59	**SP3**	**131**	**(Germany) aufkleben.de - Motorsport**	**(Germany) Michael Bohrer (Germany) Stephan Epp (Germany) Gerrit Holthaus (Germany) Michael Uelwer**	**Renault Clio RS Cup**	**131**
60	**SP6**	**81**	**(Switzerland) Hofor-Racing**	**(Austria) Michael Fischer (Netherlands) Cor Euser (Germany) Bernd Kupper (Germany) Christian Titze**	**BMW M3 CSL**	**131**
61	SP7	63	(Germany) Goder	(Germany) Tim Scheerbarth (Germany) Vincent Kolb (Germany) Georg Goder (Germany) Martin Schluter	Porsche 991 GT3 Cup	130
62	Cup 5	237	(Germany) Walkenhorst Motorsport	(Germany) Florian Weber (Netherlands) Kasper Jensen (Germany) Stefan Kruse (New Zealand) Guy Stewart	BMW M235i Racing	129
63	**V4**	**156**	**(Germany) Securtal Sorg Rennsport**	**(Germany) Torsten Kratz (Norway) Oskar Sandberg (Germany) Kevin Warum**	**BMW 325i**	**129**
64	SP6	80	(Switzerland) Hofor-Racing	(Switzerland) Chantal Kroll (Switzerland) Martin Kroll (Switzerland) Michael Kroll (Switzerland) Roland Eggimann	BMW M3 GTR	129
65	V5	151	(Germany) Pixum Team Adrenalin Motorsport	(Germany) Daniel Attalah (Belgium) Frederic Ledoux (Germany) Christian Teichert (Switzerland) Urs Zünd	Porsche Cayman	129
66	SP-X	17	(Germany) Audi Sport Team Phoenix	(Finland) Joonas Lappalainen (Germany) Alexander Mies (Germany) Peter Terting (Malaysia) Alex Yoong	Audi R8 LMS GT4	129
67	V4	143	(Germany) Pixum Team Adrenalin Motorsport	(Germany) Christopher Rink (Germany) Danny Brink (Germany) Philipp Leisen (Germany) Niklas Steinhaus	BMW E90 325i	128
68	SP6	76	(Germany) HRT-Performance	(Germany) Kim Andre Hauschild (Germany) Michael Czyborra (Germany) Mathias Huttenrauch (Czech Republic) Milan Kodidek	Porsche 991 GT3 Cup HRT	128
69	TCR	174	(Germany) mathilda racing	(Germany) Michael Paatz (Germany) Josef Kocsis (South Korea) Byunghui Kang (Germany) Knut Kluge	VW Golf GTI TCR	128
70	V4	158	(Germany) Pricon racing	(Germany) Christian Andreas Franz (Germany) Oliver Frisse (United Kingdom) Joe Moore (Germany) Kevin Totz	BMW E90 325i	127
71	SP3T	93	(Germany) Lubner Motorsport	(Germany) Mark Wallenwein (Switzerland) Roger Vogeli (Germany) Jens Wulf (Germany) Michael Bruggenkamp	Opel Astra OPC Cup	126
72	Cup 5	238	(Germany) Securtal Sorg Rennsport	(Germany) Heiko Eichenberg (Germany) Felix Gunther (Germany) Guido Wirtz	BMW M235i Racing	126
73	Cup 5	245	(Germany) Bonk Motorsport	(Japan) Kensuke Sato (Japan) Yousuke Shimojima (Japan) Ryu Seya (Germany) Jurgen Meyer	BMW M235i Racing	126
74	SP3T	94		(Germany) Ralf Lammering (Belgium) Jean-Luc Behets (Germany) Jens Rarbach (Germany) Raphael Hundeborn	Opel Astra OPC Cup	126
75	SP8	45	(Austria) TIC racing	(Germany) Stefan Kniesburges (Germany) Elmar Jurek (Germany) Maik Kraske	Ford Mustang GT	125
76	SP3	128	(United Arab Emirates) Roadrunner Racing	(Japan) Junichi Umemoto (Japan) Kouichi Okumura (Jordan) Nadir Zuhour (United Arab Emirates) Mohammed Al-Owais	Renault Clio RS	125
77	Cup 3	301	(Germany) Securtal Sorg Rennsport	(Germany) Stefan Beyer (Germany) Stefan Kenntemich (Germany) Oliver Bender (Germany) Christoph Hewer	Porsche Cayman 981 GT4 CS	125
78	Cup 5	247	(Germany) ADAC Team Weser Ems e.V.	(Germany) Andreas Schaflitzl (Germany) Andreas Ott (Germany) Ernst Thriene (Germany) Alexander Rappold	BMW M235i Racing	123
79	V4	162	(Germany) Manheller Racing	(Germany) Kurt Strubbe (Japan) Yutaka Seki (United Kingdom) Anthony Gaylard (Austria) Gerald Fischer	BMW E90 325i	123
80	SP3T	91	(Germany) SW-Racing	(Germany) Stephan Wolff (Germany) Joachim Schulz (Luxembourg) Mike Schmit (Germany) Patrick Rehs	Opel Astra J OPC	122
81	Cup 5	252	(Germany) Securtal Sorg Rennsport	(Argentina) Alessandro Salero (Argentina) Eduardo Romanelli (Argentina) Alejandro Walter Chawan (Argentina) Alfredo Cayetano Tricarichi	BMW M235i Racing	122
82	SP3T	86	(Germany) Team Mathol Racing e.V.	(Germany) Jorg Kittelmann (Germany) Klaus-Dieter Muller (Germany) Thomas Heinrich	Seat Leon Super Copa	122
83	Cup 5	242	(Germany) Pixum Team Adrenalin Motorsport	(United States) James Clay (United States) Tyler Cooke (United States) Charlie Postins (Norway) Einar Thorsen	BMW M235i Racing	120
84	SP7	61	(Germany) Gigaspeed Team GetSpeed Performance	(Germany) Ulrich Berg (Germany) Manuel Lauck (Germany) Andreas Sczepansky (Switzerland) Jean-Louis Hertenstein	Porsche 911 GT3 Cup (991)	120
85	**V2T**	**177**		**(Germany) Volker Strycek (Germany) Lena Strycek (Germany) Robin Strycek**	**Opel Astra J OPC**	**119**
86	**V3**	**161**	**(Germany) Team Mathol Racing e.V.**	**(Germany) Christian Kranenberg (Belgium) Jan Sluis (Switzerland) Luca Veronelli (Germany) Detlef Wormstall**	**Toyota GT86**	**119**
87	SP3	132	(Germany) Manheller Racing	(United Kingdom) Dale Lomas (Germany) Lucian Gavris (Germany) Moritz Gusenbauer (Germany) Werner Gusenbauer	Toyota GT86	118
88	SP3	129		(Germany) Daniel Overbeck (Germany) Tobias Overbeck (Germany) Thomas Overbeck (Germany) Cassandra Reichle	Renault Clio RS	118
89	V5	145	(Germany) pricon racing	(United Kingdom) Simon Glenn (United Kingdom) Jody Halse (United Kingdom) Marcos Burnett	BMW E36 M3	114
90	SP8	49	(United Kingdom) Aston Martin Lagonda of Europe	(Germany) Heinz Jurgen Kroner (New Zealand) Tony Richards (United States) David Thilenius (Germany) Wolfgang Schuhbauer	Aston Martin Vantage V12	114
91	SP3	118		(Mexico) Xavier Lamadrid Jr. (Mexico) Xavier Lamadrid (Spain) Nicolas Abril (Germany) Frank Haack	Renault Clio RS Cup	113
92	SP3	120	(Germany) AC 1927 Mayen e.V. im ADAC	(Germany) Ralph Liesenfeld (Germany) Benjamin Decius (Germany) Achim Nett (Germany) Stephan Reuter	VW Golf 3 16V	112
93	V5	153	(Germany) Pixum Team Adrenalin Motorsport	(Switzerland) Sascha Aebi (Bahrain) Jaber Al-Khalifa (Germany) Uwe Mallwitz (Germany) Uwe Legermann	BMW Z4 3.0si	111
94	Cup 5	243	(Germany) Pixum Team Adrenalin Motorsport	(Finland) Juha Hannonen (Italy) Edoardo Bugane (Italy) Francesco Bugane (Italy) Alessandro Cremascoli	BMW M235i Racing	109
95	SP3T	95	(South Korea) Hyundai N	(Netherlands) Pieter Schothorst (South Korea) Jong-hyuk Kwon (South Korea) Youngsun Jee (Germany) Jens Dralle	Hyundai i30 N	109
96	**SP2T**	**114**	**(Switzerland) Stanco &Tanner Motorsport**	**(Germany) Stephan Kuhs (Switzerland) Sandro Rothenberger (Switzerland) Sarah Toniutti (Germany) Rolf Weissenfels**	**Renault Clio Endurance**	**108**
97	V6	134	(Germany) Securtal Sorg Rennsport	(Germany) Bjorn Simon (Germany) Nicolas Griebner (Germany) Emin Akata (United States) Jim Briody	Porsche Cayman S	107
98	Cup 3	311	(Germany) Team Mathol Racing e.V.	(Germany) Marc Keilwerth (Argentina) Marcos Vazquez (Germany) Timo Mölig (Italy) Domenico Solombrino	Porsche Cayman 981 GT4 CS	107
99	V4	154	(Germany) Securtal Sorg Rennsport	(Germany) Olaf Meyer (Italy) Alberto Carobbio (Italy) Ugo Vicenzi (Germany) Nicolas Griebner	BMW 325i	103
100	SP3	125		(Germany) Michael Milz (Germany) Theo Milz (Germany) Roman Schiemenz (Germany) Oliver Greven	Renault Clio Cup III	99
101	SP2T	112		(Germany) Ralf Zensen (Switzerland) Ralph Beck (Germany) Fabian Peizmeier (Sweden) Fredrik Lestrup	Mini JCW	99
102	SP8T	51	(Germany) Team Schirmer Pirelli Deutschland	(Germany) Michael Funke (Germany) Dirk Heldmann (Germany) Rolf Scheibner (Belgium) Stef Van Campenhoudt	BMW M4	99
103	SP3	123	Toyota Gazoo Racing Team Thailand	(Thailand) Suttipong Smittachartch (Thailand) Nattavude Charoensukawattana (Thailand) Manat Kulapalanont (Thailand) Nattapong Hortongkum	Toyota Corolla Altis	95
104	SP3	124	Toyota Gazoo Racing Team Thailand	(Thailand) Grant Supaphongs (Japan) Takayuki Kinoshita (Thailand) Arthit Ruengsomboon (Taiwan) Chen Jian Hong	Toyota Corolla Altis	94
105	SP8	41	(Germany) Novel	(Germany) Uwe Kleen (Germany) Klaus Völker (Germany) Michael Tischner (Japan) Kota Sasaki	Lexus ISF CCS-R	94
106	SP3T	85	(Germany) RLE International	(Germany) Patrick Prill (Germany) Marcel Willert (Germany) Steffen Schlichenmeier (Germany) Thorsten Held	Ford Focus	93
107	AT	107	(Germany) Team Tuning Akademie	(Germany) Thomas Hanisch (Finland) Markku Honkanen (Germany) Michael Eichhorn	Audi A5 Quattro	90
108	V4	141	(Germany) Pixum Team Adrenalin Motorsport	(Germany) Christopher Rink (Germany) Ralph-Peter Rink (Germany) Ioannis Smyrlis (Germany) Klaus-Dieter Frommer	BMW E90 325i	84
109	Cup 5	251	(Germany) Team Mathol Racing e.V.	(Argentina) Jose Manuel Balbiani (Argentina) Roberto Fernando Falcon (Germany) Harald Geisselhart (Ukraine) Glib Kutepov	BMW M235i Racing	81
NC	SP3	117	(Germany) TJ - Racing -Team	(Germany) Daniel Aengeneyndt (Germany) Markus Weinstock (Germany) Marcus Bulgrin (Germany) Heiko Gros	Opel Calibra	77
NC	SP3	116	(Germany) TJ - Racing -Team	(Germany) Tobias Jung (Germany) Marcel Müller (Germany) Marc Roitzheim	Opel Calibra TJ-R	63
DNF	SP9	50	(Germany) Mercedes-AMG Team HTP Motorsport	(Austria) Dominik Baumann (Germany) Maximilian Buhk (Italy) Edoardo Mortara (Sweden) Edward Sandström	Mercedes-AMG GT3	155
DNF	SP-X	704	(Switzerland) Traum Motorsport	(United States) Jeff Westphal (France) Franck Mailleux (Sweden) Andreas Simonsen (Germany) Felipe Fernández Laser	SCG 003C	127
DNF	SP3T	90	(Japan) Subaru Tecnica International	(Netherlands) Carlo van Dam (Germany) Marcel Lasée (Germany) Tim Schrick (Japan) Hideki Yamauchi	Subaru WRX STi	126
DNF	SP8T	53	(Germany) Team Schirmer Pirelli Deutschland	(Germany) Uwe Ebertz (Germany) Hans-Martin Gass (Germany) Heiko Hahn (Germany) Tom Moran	BMW M2	126
DNF	SP9	43	(Germany) BMW Team Schnitzer	(Brazil) Augusto Farfus (United Kingdom) Alex Lynn (Portugal) António Félix da Costa (Germany) Timo Scheider	BMW M6 GT3	121
DNF	SP7	68	(Germany) Kappeler Motorsport	(Switzerland) Willy Hüppi (Germany) Thomas Kappeler (Germany) Thomas Gerling (Germany) Harald Hennes	Porsche 991 Cup	120
DNF	SP3T	96	(Germany) Lubner Motorsport	(Finland) Ilkka Kariste (Germany) Guido Heinrich (Germany) Norbert Mehling (Germany) Herbert von Danwitz	Opel Astra OPC Cup	117
DNF	SP9	28	(Germany) Audi Sport Team Land / Land-Motorsport	(United States) Connor De Phillippi (Germany) Christopher Mies (Germany) Christopher Haase (Germany) Pierre Kaffer	Audi R8 LMS	113
DNF	SP9	59	(Germany) Manthey Racing	(Switzerland) Steve Smith (Germany) "Randy Walls" (Austria) Harald Proczyk (Germany) Sven Muller	Porsche 991 GT3 R	103
DNF	Cup 5	236	(Germany) Walkenhorst Motorsport	(Germany) Thomas D. Hetzer (United Kingdom) Raoul Owens (Germany) Thomas Leyherr (Japan) Kato Temhai	BMW M235i Racing	103
DNF	SP10	73	(Germany) Team Mathol Racing e.V.	(Germany) Wolfgang Weber (Germany) Andre Duve (Sweden) Erik Johansson (Argentina) Juan Manuel Silva	Aston Martin Vantage V8 GT4	100
DNF	V4	142	(Germany) Pixum Team Adrenalin Motorsport	(Germany) Christoph Magg (Germany) Holger Kroth (Germany) Ulf Wickop (Germany) Richard Moers	325i	100
DNF	SP3	127	(United Arab Emirates) Roadrunner Racing	(Germany) Jurgen Peter (Denmark) Claus Gronning (Germany) Arndt Hallmanns	Renault Clio Cup	93
DNF	SP10	70	(Switzerland) R-Motorsport	(Switzerland) Andreas Banziger (Austria) Florian Kamelger (Germany) Markus Lungstrass (Australia) Peter Leemhuis	Aston Martin Vantage GT4	92
DNF	TCR	173	(Finland) LMS Engineering	(Germany) Ulrich Andree (Germany) Mike Jäger (Germany) Matthias Wasel (Germany) Pierre Humbert	Audi RS3 LMS DSG	89
DNF	SP8	2	(Germany) MSC Adenau	(Germany) Stephan Wolflick (Switzerland) Urs Bressan (Germany) Jurgen Gagstatter (Germany) Tobias Neuser	Ford Mustang GT WR	89
DNF	SP-X	35	(Germany) GTronix360 Team mcchip-dkr	(Germany) "Dieter Schmidtmann" (Germany) Heiko Hammel (Germany) Dominik Schwager	Renault R.S.01	88
DNF	V4	160		(Germany) Victor Smolski (Germany) Matthias Trinius (Germany) Nora Göltenbodt (Switzerland) Dario Corsini	BMW 325i	82
DNF	SP3	126	(Germany) Ring Racing	(Germany) Nils Jung (Germany) Florian Wolf (Switzerland) Manuel Amweg (Switzerland) Frederic Yerly	Toyota GT86	76
DNF	SP3	130	(Germany) Pit Lane - AMC Sankt Vi	(Belgium) Philippe Broodcooren (Belgium) Jacques Derenne (Italy) Bruno Barbaro (United States) Jean-Francois Brunot	Toyota GT86	75
DNF	SP9	101	(Germany) Walkenhorst Motorsport	(Germany) Henry Walkenhorst (France) Jordan Tresson (Germany) David Schiwietz (Netherlands) Jaap van Lagen	BMW M6 GT3	74
DNF	SP3	122	(Germany) Kissling Motorsport / Team Beckmann	(Germany) Olaf Beckmann (Germany) Peter Hass (Germany) Volker Strycek (Germany) Jürgen Schulten	Opel Manta (Flying Fox) GT	71
DNF	V5	146	(Germany) ADAC Team Weser Ems e.V.	(United Kingdom) Ian Mitchell (Germany) Thomas Müller (Germany) Udo Schauland (Luxembourg) Alain Pier	Porsche Cayman 981	56
DNF	SP10	71	(Belgium) Mühlner Motorsport	(United States) Peter Ludwig (Germany) Moritz Kranz (Belgium) Bruno Beulen	Porsche Cayman GT4	51
DNF	SP7	64	(Germany) clickvers.de Team	(Germany) Robin Chrzanowski (Germany) Kersten Jodexnis (Germany) Dominic Fuchs (Germany) Edgar Salewsky	Porsche 911 GT3 Cup MR	49
DNF	SP7	55		(Germany) Andre Krumbach (Switzerland) Ivan Reggiani (Switzerland) Nicola Bravetti (Germany) Stefan Nägler	Porsche 997 GT3 Cup	45
DNF	SP10	74	(Germany) Team Mathol Racing e.V.	(Germany) Achim Wawer (Germany) Volker Wawer (Germany) Daniel Schwerfeld (Australia) Rob Thomson	Porsche Cayman GT4 CS	37
DNF	SP6	78	(Germany) Prosport Performance	(Sweden) Anders Carlsson (Sweden) Jonas Carlsson (Germany) Michael Hess (Germany) Philip Hamprecht	Porsche Cayman	33
DNF	SP9	10	(Belgium) Audi Sport Team WRT	(Belgium) Frédéric Vervisch (Germany) Frank Stippler (Germany) René Rast (Switzerland) Nico Müller	Audi R8 LMS	32
DNF	V4	159	(Germany) MSC Adenau e.V. im ADAC	(Germany) Michael Mönch (Germany) Jan von Kiedrowski (Germany) Ralf Kraus (Netherlands) Marco van Ramshorst	BMW E90 325i	31
DNF	SP7	65	(Germany) Black Falcon Team TMD Friction	(Germany) Jürgen Bleul (Germany) Stefan Karg (Switzerland) "Takis" (Spain) Alexander Toril	Porsche 991 GT3	29
DNF	SP9	911	(Germany) Manthey Racing	(France) Romain Dumas (France) Frédéric Makowiecki (France) Patrick Pilet (Austria) Richard Lietz	Porsche 991 GT3 R	27
DNF	SP9	47	(Germany) Mercedes-AMG Team HTP Motorsport	(Germany) Sebastian Asch (Austria) Dominik Baumann (Germany) Christian Hohenadel (Germany) Stefan Mücke	Mercedes-AMG GT3	27
DNF	SP9	12	(Germany) Manthey Racing	(Germany) Otto Klohs (Germany) Robert Renauer (France) Mathieu Jaminet (Italy) Matteo Cairoli	Porsche 991 GT3 R	26
DNF	SP9 LG	38	(Germany) Bentley Team Abt	(Germany) Christer Jöns (Germany) Christian Mamerow (South Africa) Jordan Pepper (Germany) Christopher Brück	Bentley Continental GT3	26
DNF	SP9	44	(Germany) Falken Motorsports	(Austria) Martin Ragginger (Germany) Dirk Werner (Germany) Jörg Bergmeister (Belgium) Laurens Vanthoor	Porsche 991 GT3 R	26
DNF	AT	13		(Germany) Titus Dittmann (Germany) Bernd Albrecht (Germany) Reinhard Schall (Germany) Michael Lachmayer	Chrysler Dodge Viper CC	23
DNF	SP8	32	(Germany) Ring Racing	(Germany) Uwe Kleen (Germany) Helmut Baumann (Germany) Horst Baumann (Germany) Klaus Niesen	Lexus RCF	19
DNF	SP9	11	(Austria) Konrad Motorsport	(Italy) Marco Mapelli (Germany) Hendrik Still (Germany) Christian Engelhart (Germany) Dominik Farnbacher	Lamborghini Huracan GT3	14
DNF	Cup 5	250	(Germany) Scheid Honert Motorsport	(Austria) Thomas Jäger (Germany) Rudi Adams (Germany) Tobias Müller	BMW M235i Racing	12
DNF	V2T	164	(Germany) rent2Drive-Familia-racing	(Germany) Axel Jahn (Germany) Andrei Sidorenko (Germany) David Ackermann (Germany) Johann Wanger	Renault Megane RS	12
DNF	V6	136	(Germany) aesthetic Racing GmbH	(Germany) Stein Tveten (Germany) Yannick Fübrich (Germany) Torleif Nytröen	Porsche 911 Carrera (991)	9
DNF	SP6	79	(Germany) rent2Drive-Familia-racing	(Germany) Carsten Welschar (Germany) Bernd Kleeschulte (Germany) Jörg Wiskirchen (Germany) Marcel Belka	Porsche GT3 Cup	9
DNF	V4	155	(Germany) Team AutoArenA Motorsport	(Germany) Marc Marbach (Germany) Steven Fürsch (Germany) Jürgen Bretschneider	Mercedes-Benz C230	9
DNF	SP8T	39	(Germany) Securtal Sorg Rennsport	(Denmark) Niels Borum (New Zealand) Wayne Moore (New Zealand) Michael Eden	BMW 335i	9
DNF	SP6	77	(Germany) Prosport Performance	(United States) Charles Putman (United States) Charles Espenlaub (United States) Joe Foster (United Kingdom) Andy Pilgrim	Porsche Cayman	5
DNS	SP9	100	(Germany) Walkenhorst Motorsport	(Norway) Christian Krognes (Germany) Michele Di Martino (Finland) Matias Henkola (Germany) Nico Menzel	BMW M6 GT3	0
DNS	AT	105	(Germany) OVR Racing Cologne	(Germany) Ralph Caba (Germany) Volker Lange (Germany) Oliver Sprungmann	Ford Focus RS	0
DNS	Cup 3	302	(Belgium) Mühlner Motorsport	(Canada) Mark Thomas (Germany) Alexander Schula (Germany) Michael Rebhan	Porsche Cayman 981 GT4 CS	0
DNA	TCR	176	(Germany) mathilda racing	(Germany) Michael Paatz (Germany) Lutz Ruhl	Seat Leon TCR	0

== Bibliography ==
- Jörg-Richard Ufer & Tim Upietz. 24 Stunden Nürburgring Nordschleife 2017. Gruppe C Motorsport Verlag. ISBN 978-3-928540-90-2.
