= Tobias Müller (racing driver) =

German racing driver (born 1997)

- Nationality: (Germany) German
- Born: 13 October 1997 (age 29) Euskirchen, Germany
- Categorisation: FIA Silver

Championship titles
- 2026 2024 2020 2019: NLS – SP9 Pro-Am; PETN – Cup2; NLS – SP-Pro; VLN Series – SP10

Tobias Müller (born 13 October 1997) is a German racing driver who last competed in the Nürburgring Langstrecken-Serie for 48LOSCH Motorsport by Black Falcon. He has won the Nürburgring 24 Hours in five different classes, and was Porsche Endurance Trophy Nürburgring champion in 2024.

== Career ==
Müller began karting in 2005, competing until 2016. During his time in karts, Müller most notably won the 2012 Euro Kart Cup in the Rotax Max Junior class, and also finished ninth in the DD2 class of the 2016 Rotax Max Challenge.

Making his car racing debut in 2017, Müller joined MKR Engineering to race a BMW M235i in the VLN Series. In his first season in the Nürburgring-based series, Müller scored a podium at VLN2, as well as racing in the 24 Hours of Nürburgring for Scheid Honert Motorsport in Cup 5. Continuing with the latter team for his sophomore season in the VLN Series the following year, Müller finished third in the BMW M235i Cup standings, as well as winning the 24 Hours of Nürburgring for Mühlner Motorsport in Cup 3, aboard a Porsche Cayman GT4. Staying in GT4 machinery for 2019, Müller joined Mercedes-linked Black Falcon for his third VLN season, during which he took the SP10 title with four wins to his name, and securing his second consecutive class win at the standalone 24 Hours of Nürburgring, also in SP10.

After racing in the 2020 Dubai 24 Hour for BMW customer team Bonk Motorsport, Müller spent the rest of the year in the newly-renamed Nürburgring Langstrecken-Serie for Porsche-fielding Black Falcon in the SP-Pro class. As the only entry to the class, Müller won all five races and clinched the title by default, as was also the case at the 24 Hours of Nürburgring. Stepping up to GT3 machinery for the following year, Müller joined Porsche-linked Rutronik Racing to compete in the first three rounds of the NLS and the 24 Hours of Nürburgring, before completing the season with Frikadelli Racing Team and Falken Motorsports, scoring an outright podium with the latter at NLS7.

Returning to Black Falcon for 2022, Müller raced with them in the brand-new Porsche Endurance Trophy Nürburgring, scoring two wins en route to a ninth-place points finish in the Cup2 standings. He made headlines at NLS8—after an engine failure left him stranded for several minutes, onboard cameras showed Müller swearing at marshals for only waving a yellow flag. He later apologised, admitting he had "feared for [his] life". In 2023, Müller again finished ninth with one win, adding a class podium at the 24 Hours of Nürburgring and a cameo in the SP9 class of the Nürburgring Langstrecken-Serie for Rutronik Racing. At the end of the year, Müller raced in the 12 Hours of Kuwait for KKrämer Racing, finishing third in the 992 class. Remaining with Black Falcon for a third PETN season, Müller won four of the eight races he contested to secure the Cup2 title. During 2024, Müller also won the inaugural edition of the 992 Endurance Cup for the same team.

Müller then remained with Black Falcon to defend his title the following year, ultimately coming runner-up in points after scoring two wins. He also pulled double duty in NLS7, where he won both the Cup2 and SP9 Am classes, set the overall fastest lap and was chosen driver of the day. During 2025, Müller also won the 24 Hours of Nürburgring in Cup2, as well as the 992 Endurance Cup for the same team. After undergoing foot surgery in the winter, Müller reunited with Black Falcon to race a Porsche 911 GT3 R (992.2) in the SP9 Pro-Am class of the Nürburgring Langstrecken-Serie in 2026. In the opening hour of NLS2, Müller notably charged from 12th to 3rd, trailing only Christopher Haase and Max Verstappen, en route to his first class win of the season. Another class victory and overall top 10 followed at the 24 Hours of Nürburgring, before Müller reunited with Mühlner Motorsport to make his 24 Hours of Spa debut. Following that, Müller took five class wins in a row to secure the SP9 Pro-Am title alongside Patrick Assenheimer and Dylan Pereira at NLS9.

== Karting record ==
=== Karting career summary ===
Season	Series	Team	Position
2012	Euro Wintercup — Rotax Max Junior		9th
2012	Euro Kart Cup — Rotax Max Junior		1st
2012	24 Hours of Cologne	SFG Schönau	10th
2014	Deutsche Kart-Meisterschaft – KF	Kartshop Ampfing	20th
2015	Deutsche Kart-Meisterschaft – KF	Kartshop Ampfing	17th
2016	Rotax Max Challenge Germany – DD2		9th

== Racing record ==
=== Racing career summary ===
Season	Series	Team	Races	Wins	Poles	F/Laps	Podiums	Points	Position
2017	VLN Series – BMW M235i Cup	MKR Engineering	8	0	0	0	1	62	10th
2017	24 Hours of Nürburgring – Cup 5	Scheid Honert Motorsport	1	0	0	0	0	—N/a	DNF
2018	VLN Series – BMW M235i Cup	Team Scheid – Honert Motorsport	9					144	**3rd**
2018	24 Hours of Nürburgring – Cup 3	Mühlner Motorsport	1	1	0	0	1	—N/a	**1st**
2019	VLN Series – SP10	Black Falcon	8	4	0	0	7	64.06	**1st**
2019	24 Hours of Nürburgring – SP10	Black Falcon Team Identica	1	1	0	0	1	—N/a	**1st**
2020	24H GT Series – GT4	Hofor Racing powered by Bonk Motorsport	1	0	0	0	0	14	NC
2020	Nürburgring Langstrecken-Serie – SP-Pro	Black Falcon	5	5	5	5	5	20	**1st**
2020	24 Hours of Nürburgring – SP-Pro	Black Falcon Team Identica	1	1	1	1	1	—N/a	**1st**
2021	Nürburgring Langstrecken-Serie – SP9	Rutronik Racing	3	0	0	0	0	0	NC
2021	Nürburgring Langstrecken-Serie – SP9	Frikadelli Racing Team	2	0	0	0	0	0	NC
2021	Nürburgring Langstrecken-Serie – SP9	Falken Motorsports	3	0	0	0	1	0	NC
2021	Nürburgring Langstrecken-Serie – SP-Pro	Black Falcon	1	0	0	0	1	0	NC
2021	24 Hours of Nürburgring – SP9	Rutronik Racing	1	0	0	0	0	—N/a	DNF
2022	Porsche Endurance Trophy Nürburgring – Cup2	Black Falcon Team IDENTICA	8	2	1	2	4	75	9th
2022	24 Hours of Nürburgring – Cup2	Black Falcon Team IDENTICA	1	0	0	0	0	—N/a	DNF
2023	Nürburgring Langstrecken-Serie – SP9	Rutronik Racing	2	0	0	0	0	0	NC
2023	Porsche Endurance Trophy Nürburgring – Cup2	KKrämer Racing	6	1	2	4	4	91.5	9th
2023	24 Hours of Nürburgring – Cup2 Pro	Mühlner Motorsport	1	0	0	0	1	—N/a	**3rd**
2023–24	Middle East Trophy – 992	KKrämer Racing	1	0	0	0	1	32	NC
2024	Porsche Endurance Trophy Nürburgring – Cup2	Black Falcon	3	0	0	1	1	128	**1st**
2024	Porsche Endurance Trophy Nürburgring – Cup2	Black Falcon Team 48 LOSCH	7	4	2	3	6	128	**1st**
2024	24 Hours of Nürburgring – Cup2 Pro	Black Falcon Team 48 LOSCH	1	0	0	0	0	—N/a	10th
2024	992 Endurance Cup	Black Falcon Team 48 LOSCH	1	1	0	0	1	—N/a	**1st**
2025	Nürburgring Langstrecken-Serie – SP9 Am	Black Falcon Team EAE	1	1	1	1	1	6	NC
2025	Porsche Endurance Trophy Nürburgring – Cup2	48 LOSCH Motorsport by Black Falcon	8	2	4	4	7	141.5	**2nd**
2025	24 Hours of Nürburgring – Cup 2 Pro	48 LOSCH Motorsport by Black Falcon	1	1	0	0	1	—N/a	**1st**
2025	992 Endurance Cup	Black Falcon Team 48 LOSCH	1	1	0	0	1	—N/a	**1st**
2026	Nürburgring Langstrecken-Serie – SP9 Pro-Am	48LOSCH Motorsport by Black Falcon	7	6	0	0	6	87	**1st**
2026	24 Hours of Nürburgring – SP9 Pro-Am	48LOSCH Motorsport by Black Falcon	1	1	0	0	1	—N/a	**1st**
2026	Intercontinental GT Challenge	48LOSCH Motorsport by Black Falcon	1	0	0	0	0	6	27th
2026	Intercontinental GT Challenge	Mühlner Motorsport	1	0	0	0	0	6	27th
2026	GT World Challenge Europe Endurance Cup	Mühlner Motorsport	1	0	0	0	0	0	NC
2026	GT World Challenge Europe Endurance Cup – Bronze	Mühlner Motorsport	1	0	0	0	0	2	39th

=== Complete 24 Hours of Nürburgring results ===
Year	Team	Co-Drivers	Car	Class	Laps	Pos.	Class Pos.
2017	(Germany) Scheid Honert Motorsport	(Austria) Thomas Jäger (Germany) Rudi Adams	BMW M235i Racing	Cup 5	12	DNF	DNF
2018	(Belgium) Mühlner Motorsport	(Germany) Moritz Kranz (Germany) Timo Mölig (Germany) Michael Rebhan	Porsche Cayman GT4 Clubsport	Cup 3	122	28th	**1st**
2019	(Germany) Black Falcon Team Identica	(Germany) Marek Böckmann (Switzerland) Yannick Mettler (Estonia) Tristan Viidas	Mercedes-AMG GT4	SP10	145	17th	**1st**
2020	(Germany) Black Falcon Team Identica	(Germany) Marek Böckmann (Luxembourg) Carlos Rivas (Germany) Maik Rosenberg	Porsche 911 GT3 Cup MR	SP-Pro	77	22nd	**1st**
2021	(Germany) Rutronik Racing	(France) Julien Andlauer (France) Romain Dumas (Belgium) Laurens Vanthoor	Porsche 911 GT3 R	SP9	47	DNF	DNF
2022	(Germany) Black Falcon Team IDENTICA	(Netherlands) Paul Harkema (Germany) Noah Nagelsdiek (Germany) Tim Scheerbarth	Porsche 911 GT3 Cup (992)	Cup2; Pro	97	DNF	DNF
2023	(Belgium) Mühlner Motorsport	(United Kingdom) Alex Brundle (Germany) Ben Bünnagel (Germany) Kai Riemer	Porsche 911 GT3 Cup (992)	Cup2; Pro	145	31st	**3rd**
2024	(Germany) Black Falcon Team 48 LOSCH	(Luxembourg) Steve Jans (Germany) Noah Nagelsdiek (Netherlands) Morris Schuring	Porsche 911 GT3 Cup (992)	Cup2; Pro	45	30th	10th
2025	(Germany) 48 Losch by Black Falcon	(Germany) Noah Nagelsdiek (Luxembourg) Dylan Pereira (Luxembourg) Carlos Rivas	Porsche 911 GT3 Cup (992)	Cup2; Pro	135	11th	**1st**
2026	(Germany) 48LOSCH Motorsport by Black Falcon	(Netherlands) Daan Arrow (Germany) Patrick Assenheimer (Luxembourg) Dylan Pereira	Porsche 911 GT3 R (992.2)	SP9; Pro-Am	154	9th	**1st**

=== Complete GT World Challenge Europe results ===
==== GT World Challenge Europe Endurance Cup ====
(Races in bold indicate pole position) (Races in italics indicate fastest lap)

Year	Team	Car	Class	1	2	3	4	5	6	7	Pos.	Points
2026	Mühlner Motorsport	Porsche 911 GT3 R (992.2)	Bronze	LEC	MNZ	SPA; 6H; 57	SPA; 12H; 49	SPA; 24H; 45	NÜR	ALG	39th	2
