= Tauras Tunyla =

Lithuanian racer (born 1993)

Tauras Tunyla (born August 8, 1993 in Klaipėda city, Lithuania) is a Lithuanian racer. Trained by his father Gintaras Tunyla, he started karting from the age of 5 (in 1998). Tauras became a vice-champion of Lithuania in 2000, won his first Lithuanian championship in 2001 and is a five-time champion of Lithuania

== Early life and career ==
Tauras enjoyed cars at a very young age. According to his mother, he was a very energetic child and the car was the only place where he could stay calm. His father, a former kart racer himself, built a self-made kart and started training Tauras when he was five years of age.

The family did not have sufficient resources for quality and expensive racing equipment, coaches or mechanics. All the training was done by Tauras’ father. They both were improving an old Soviet type kart so the racer obtained good knowledge in mechanics at a relevantly young age.

Tauras showed very good results in Lithuanian and Baltic championships. He participated in about 100 races and won 72 of them.

Tauras joined a professional kart team in 2008 and started racing abroad. Unfortunately, his father had some disagreements with the team leader and young racer had to stop his professional career and leave the team.

After a four-year career break Tauras returned to the sport in 2013. He joined forces with professional PR manager, received his first moderate sponsorship, built a racing car and took part in an Autoplius Fast Lap race with Mazda Miata roadster. He got into the Top 3 with comparatively low powered car (220 hp) in the unlimited power class.

== Photography and video art ==
During the break in his racing career, Tauras stayed close to the car sports and observed it through the lens of the camera. Soon he became one a car sport photographer and film maker in Lithuania, working under TAT Designs brand. The list of his clients includes Lithuanian racers Dominykas Butvilas, Benediktas Vanagas as well as international brands: Opel, Nissan, BMW, Orlen and Statoil.

== Career summary ==
Year	Race	Achievement
2000	Lithuanian Kart Championship, 1st stage, junior class (Vilnius, Lithuania)	2nd place
2000	Lithuanian Kart Championship, 2nd stage, junior class (Aukštadvaris, Lithuania)	3rd place
2000	Lithuanian Kart Championship, 3rd stage, junior class (Šiauliai, Lithuania)	2nd place
2000	Lithuanian Kart Championship, 4th stage, junior class (Aukštadvaris, Lithuania)	2nd place
2000	Lithuanian Kart Championship 5th stage, junior class (Vilnius, Lithuania)	2nd place
2000	Lithuanian Kart Championship	Vice-champion
2001	Baltic Championship, 1st stage, junior class (Kaliningrad, Russia)	1st place
2001	Baltic Championship, 2nd stage, junior class (Kaliningrad, Russia)	1st place
2002	Prienai 500 jubilee race, junior class (Prienai, Lithuania)	1st place
2002	Lithuanian Karting Federation Cup, F-micro class (Šiauliai, Lithuania)	2nd place
2002	Lithuanian Karting Championship, B league, 3rd stage, 80 cubic cm class (Šiauliai, Lithuania)	1st place
2002	Baltic Championship, 1st stage, F-micro and Junior Class (Kaliningrad, Russia)	1st place
2002	Lithuanian Karting Championship, B league, 8th stage, 80 cubic cm class (Prienai, Lithuania)	1st place
2002	Lithuanian Karting Championship, Birštonas Cup, 80 cubic cm class (Birštonas, Lithuania)	1st place
2002	Šakiai Aidas Januškevičius Transition Cup, 5th stage, 80 cubic cm class (Šakiai, Lithuania)	1st place
2003	Lithuanian Karting B League, Birštonas Cup, 80 cubic cm class (Birštonas, Lithuania)	1st place
2003	Lithuanian School Children Karting Finals, 2nd stage, 50 cubic cm class (Raguva, Lithuania)	1st place
2003	Lithuanian Karting B League, 3rd stage, 80 cubic cm class (Prienai, Lithuania)	1st place
2003	Lithuanian Karting B League, Birštonas Cup, 80 cubic cm class (Birštonas, Lithuania)	1st place
2003	Klaipėda Karting Cup, 80 cubic cm class (Klaipėda, Lithuania)	1st place
2003	Lithuanian Open Karting Race, 2nd stage, 80 cubic cm class (Prienai, Lithuania)	1st place
2004	Sports Department Cup, 80 cubic cm class (Kėdainiai, Lithuania)	1st place
2004	Baltic Championship, 1st stage, 50 cubic cm class (Kaliningrad, Russia)	1st place
2004	Sports Department Cup, 80 cubic cm class (Klaipėda, Lithuania)	1st place
2004	Šakiai Aidas Januškevičius Transition Cup, 5th stage, 80 cubic cm class (Šakiai, Lithuania)	1st place
2005	Lithuanian Karting Federation Cup, 4th stage, Junior class (Šiauliai, Lithuania)	1st place
2005	Lithuanian Karting Federation Cup, 2nd stage, Junior class (Vilnius, Lithuania)	1st place
2005	Lithuanian Karting Federation Cup, 3rd stage, Junior class (Raguva, Lithuania)	1st place
2005	Lithuanian Karting Federation Cup, 4th stage, Junior class (Aukštadvaris, Lithuania)	1st place
2005	Šakiai Aidas Januškevičius Transition Cup, 5th stage, 80 cubic cm class (Šakiai, Lithuania)	1st place
2005	Kaliningrad Karting Season Closure, “Pilot” class (Kaliningrad, Russia)	1st place
2005	Open Panevežys Karting Race, 80 cubic cm class (Panevežys, Lithuania)	1st place and the Best Racer title
2005	Poland Karting Championship, 80 cubic cm class (Suwalki, Poland)	1st place
2007	Lithuanian Karting Championship, 80 cubic cm class	Champion
2006	Poland Karting Championship, “M-125” class (Suwalki, Poland)	1st place
2006	Šakiai Aidas Januškevičius Transition Cup, 1st stage, “M-125 Junior” and Junior class (Šakiai, Lithuania)	1st place
2006	Open Panevežys Karting Race, Mayor's Cup, “M-125 Junior” and Junior class (Raguva, Lithuania)	1st place
2006	Šakiai Aidas Januškevičius Transition Cup, 1st stage, “M-125 Junior” and Junior class (Šakiai, Lithuania)	1st place
2006	Lithuanian Karting Federation, B league, 2nd stage, “M-125 Junior” and Junior class (Šakiai, Lithuania)	1st place
2006	Lithuanian Karting Federation, B league, 3rd stage, “M-125 Junior” and Junior class (Anykščiai, Lithuania)	2nd place
2006	Lithuanian Karting Season Closure Race, “M-125 Junior” and Junior class (Aukštadvaris, Lithuania)	1st place
2006	Lithuanian Karting Federation, B league, “M-125 Junior” and Junior class	Champion
2007	Lithuanian Karting Federation, B league, 1st stage, “M-125 Junior” class (Šiauliai, Lithuania)	1st place
2007	Open Panevežys Karting Race, Mayor's Cup, “M-125 Junior” class (Raguva, Lithuania)	1st place
2007	Aidas Januškevičius Race, 2nd stage, “M-125 Junior” class (Šakiai, Lithuania)	2nd place
2007	Aidas Januškevičius Race, 3rd stage, “M-125 Junior” class (Raguva, Lithuania)	1st place
2007	Lithuanian Kart Federation B league, stage IV, “M-125 Junior” class (Aukštadvaris, Lithuania)	1st place
2007	Lithuanian Karting Federation, B league, “M-125 Junior” class	Champion
2008	Karting Veteran Aleksas Bartusevičius Cup, “M-125 Junior” class (Lithuania)	1st place
2008	Rotax Max Junior Cup, “Rotax Max- junior” stage (Aukštadvaris, Lithuania)	3rd place
2013	Autoplius Fast Lap, Stage IV, Extreme Race (Kačerginė, Lithuania)	3rd place
