= 2012 ADAC GT Masters =

Motorsport season

Seasons
- ← 2011 2013 →

The 2012 ADAC GT Masters season was the sixth season of the ADAC GT Masters, the grand tourer-style sports car racing founded by the German automobile club ADAC. It began on 30 March at Motorsport Arena Oschersleben and finished on 30 September at Hockenheim after eight double-header meetings. Sebastian Asch and Maximilian Götz became the champions in the drivers' standings.

== Entry list ==
Team	Car	No.	Drivers	Rounds
(Germany) Alpina	BMW ALPINA B6 GT3	1	(France) Dino Lunardi	All
(Germany) Alpina	BMW ALPINA B6 GT3	1	(Belgium) Maxime Martin	All
(Germany) LIQUI MOLY Team Engstler	BMW ALPINA B6 GT3	2	(Germany) Johannes Leidinger	All
(Germany) LIQUI MOLY Team Engstler	BMW ALPINA B6 GT3	2	(Germany) Florian Spengler	All
(Germany) InternetX-Reiter Engineering	Lamborghini Gallardo LP600+	3	(Slovakia) Štefan Rosina	1, 2, 4, 5
(Germany) InternetX-Reiter Engineering	Lamborghini Gallardo LP600+	3	(Germany) Albert von Thurn und Taxis	1, 2, 4, 5
(Germany) InternetX-Reiter Engineering	Lamborghini Gallardo LP600+	24	(Netherlands) Peter Kox	1–3
(Germany) InternetX-Reiter Engineering	Lamborghini Gallardo LP600+	24	(Switzerland) Marc A. Hayek	1, 2
(Germany) InternetX-Reiter Engineering	Lamborghini Gallardo LP600+	24	(Netherlands) Dennis Retera	3
(Germany) kfzteile24 MS Racing Team	Mercedes-Benz SLS AMG GT3	4	(Germany) Daniel Dobitsch	All
(Germany) kfzteile24 MS Racing Team	Mercedes-Benz SLS AMG GT3	4	(Germany) Florian Stoll	All
(Germany) kfzteile24 MS Racing Team	Mercedes-Benz SLS AMG GT3	5	(Germany) Sebastian Asch	All
(Germany) kfzteile24 MS Racing Team	Mercedes-Benz SLS AMG GT3	5	(Germany) Maximilian Götz	All
(Germany) Farnbacher ESET Racing	Ferrari 458 Italia GT3	6	(Germany) Mario Farnbacher	1–3
(Germany) Farnbacher ESET Racing	Ferrari 458 Italia GT3	6	(Germany) Niclas Kentenich	1–3
(Germany) Farnbacher ESET Racing	Porsche 911 GT3 R	6	(Germany) Mario Farnbacher	4–8
(Germany) Farnbacher ESET Racing	Porsche 911 GT3 R	6	(Germany) Niclas Kentenich	4–8
(Germany) HEICO Motorsport	Mercedes-Benz SLS AMG GT3	7	(Netherlands) Christiaan Frankenhout	All
(Germany) HEICO Motorsport	Mercedes-Benz SLS AMG GT3	7	(Germany) Kenneth Heyer	All
(Germany) HEICO Motorsport	Mercedes-Benz SLS AMG GT3	8	(Austria) Dominik Baumann	All
(Germany) HEICO Motorsport	Mercedes-Benz SLS AMG GT3	8	(Austria) Harald Proczyk	All
(Germany) HEICO Junior Team	Mercedes-Benz SLS AMG GT3	9	(Germany) Maximilian Buhk	All
(Germany) HEICO Junior Team	Mercedes-Benz SLS AMG GT3	9	(Sweden) Andreas Simonsen	All
(Germany) Schöner Wohnen Polarweiss HEICO Team	Mercedes-Benz SLS AMG GT3	10	(Germany) Lance David Arnold	All
(Germany) Schöner Wohnen Polarweiss HEICO Team	Mercedes-Benz SLS AMG GT3	10	(Greece) Alexandros Margaritis	All
(Germany) rhino's Leipert Motorsport	Lamborghini Gallardo LP600+	11	(Switzerland) Raffael Bader	All
(Germany) rhino's Leipert Motorsport	Lamborghini Gallardo LP600+	11	(Germany) David Mengesdorf	1–4, 6–8
(Germany) rhino's Leipert Motorsport	Lamborghini Gallardo LP600+	11	(Austria) Peter Ebner	5
(Germany) rhino's Leipert Motorsport	Lamborghini Gallardo LP600+	12	(Russia) Oleg Petrishin	1–5, 7, 8
(Germany) rhino's Leipert Motorsport	Lamborghini Gallardo LP600+	12	(Austria) Gerhard Tweraser	1, 2, 8
(Germany) rhino's Leipert Motorsport	Lamborghini Gallardo LP600+	12	(Germany) Korbinian Baier	3–5
(Germany) rhino's Leipert Motorsport	Lamborghini Gallardo LP600+	12	(Russia) Sergey Afanasyev	7
(Germany) MRS GT-Racing	McLaren MP4-12C GT3	13	(Netherlands) Patrick Huisman	1
(Germany) MRS GT-Racing	McLaren MP4-12C GT3	13	(Germany) Erwin Stückle	1
(Germany) MRS GT-Racing	McLaren MP4-12C GT3	14	(Germany) Christian Ott	1–6
(Germany) MRS GT-Racing	McLaren MP4-12C GT3	14	(Germany) Alexander Müller	1–3
(Germany) MRS GT-Racing	McLaren MP4-12C GT3	14	(Austria) Philipp Eng	4, 5, 8
(Germany) MRS GT-Racing	McLaren MP4-12C GT3	14	(Switzerland) Fredy Barth	6–8
(Germany) MRS GT-Racing	McLaren MP4-12C GT3	14	(United Kingdom) Robert Bell	7
(Switzerland) FACH AUTO TECH	Porsche 911 GT3 R	15	(Germany) Swen Dolenc	All
(Switzerland) FACH AUTO TECH	Porsche 911 GT3 R	15	(Austria) Martin Ragginger	All
(Switzerland) FACH AUTO TECH	Porsche 911 GT3 R	16	(Switzerland) Andrina Gugger	All
(Switzerland) FACH AUTO TECH	Porsche 911 GT3 R	16	(Germany) Otto Klohs	All
(Germany) Callaway Competition	Corvette Z06	17	(Switzerland) Remo Lip	All
(Germany) Callaway Competition	Corvette Z06	17	(Germany) Frank Schmickler	1–4, 6–8
(Germany) Callaway Competition	Corvette Z06	17	(Austria) Mario Dablander	5
(Germany) Callaway Competition	Corvette Z06	18	(Germany) Frank Kechele	All
(Germany) Callaway Competition	Corvette Z06	18	(Switzerland) Toni Seiler	All
(Germany) Callaway Competition	Corvette Z06	27	(Germany) Heinz-Harald Frentzen	All
(Germany) Callaway Competition	Corvette Z06	27	(Germany) Andreas Wirth	1–6, 8
(Germany) Callaway Competition	Corvette Z06	27	(Netherlands) Henry Zumbrink	7
(Germany) Callaway Competition	Corvette Z06	28	(Italy) Diego Alessi	All
(Germany) Callaway Competition	Corvette Z06	28	(Germany) Daniel Keilwitz	All
(Germany) Schubert Motorsport	BMW Z4 GT3	19	(Saudi Arabia) Abdulaziz Al Faisal	3–4
(Germany) Schubert Motorsport	BMW Z4 GT3	19	(Italy) Mirko Bortolotti	3–4
(Germany) Schubert Motorsport	BMW Z4 GT3	19	(Germany) Max Partl	8
(Germany) Schubert Motorsport	BMW Z4 GT3	19	(Germany) Jörg Weidinger	8
(Germany) Schubert Motorsport	BMW Z4 GT3	20	(Germany) Claudia Hürtgen	All
(Germany) Schubert Motorsport	BMW Z4 GT3	20	(Germany) Dominik Schwager	All
(Germany) Prosperia uhc speed	Audi R8 LMS ultra	21	(Germany) Christopher Mies	All
(Germany) Prosperia uhc speed	Audi R8 LMS ultra	21	(Germany) Christer Jöns	1–2
(Germany) Prosperia uhc speed	Audi R8 LMS ultra	21	(Sweden) Edward Sandström	3–8
(Germany) Prosperia uhc speed	Audi R8 LMS ultra	22	(Germany) Christian Abt	All
(Germany) Prosperia uhc speed	Audi R8 LMS ultra	22	(Germany) Carsten Tilke	1–3, 5–8
(Germany) Prosperia uhc speed	Audi R8 LMS ultra	22	(Germany) Luca Ludwig	4
(Sweden) WestCoast Racing	BMW Z4 GT3	23	(Sweden) Fredrik Lestrup	1–7
(Sweden) WestCoast Racing	BMW Z4 GT3	23	(Czech Republic) Martin Matzke	1–4
(Sweden) WestCoast Racing	BMW Z4 GT3	23	(Sweden) Martin Öhlin	5, 6
(Sweden) WestCoast Racing	BMW Z4 GT3	23	(Sweden) Daniel Roos	7
(Germany) Team GT3 Kasko	Porsche 911 GT3 R	25	(Germany) Georg Engelhardt	All
(Germany) Team GT3 Kasko	Porsche 911 GT3 R	25	(Germany) Marco Seefried	1–7
(Germany) Team GT3 Kasko	Porsche 911 GT3 R	25	(Denmark) Nicki Thiim	8
(Germany) Team GT3 Kasko	Porsche 911 GT3 R	26	(Germany) René Bourdeaux	All
(Germany) Team GT3 Kasko	Porsche 911 GT3 R	26	(Germany) Alfred Renauer	All
(Germany) Team GT3 Kasko	Porsche 911 GT3 R	51	(Germany) Norbert Janz	6
(Germany) Team GT3 Kasko	Porsche 911 GT3 R	51	(Germany) Christoph Schrezenmeier	6
(Germany) Frogreen CO2 neutral	Porsche 911 GT3 R	29	(Germany) Robert Renauer	All
(Germany) Frogreen CO2 neutral	Porsche 911 GT3 R	29	(Denmark) Nicki Thiim	1, 4
(Germany) Frogreen CO2 neutral	Porsche 911 GT3 R	29	(Netherlands) Jeroen Bleekemolen	2
(Germany) Frogreen CO2 neutral	Porsche 911 GT3 R	29	(France) Nicolas Armindo	3, 5–8
(Germany) Frogreen CO2 neutral	Porsche 911 GT3 R	30	(Germany) Wolfgang Hageleit	5
(Germany) Frogreen CO2 neutral	Porsche 911 GT3 R	30	(Austria) Sven Heyrowsky	5
(Germany) Schulze Motorsport	Nissan GT-R GT3	31	(Germany) Michael Schulze	1–6
(Germany) Schulze Motorsport	Nissan GT-R GT3	31	(Germany) Tobias Schulze	1–6
(Germany) Young Driver AMR	Aston Martin V12 Vantage	32	(Austria) Ferdinand Stuck	1–7
(Germany) Young Driver AMR	Aston Martin V12 Vantage	32	(Austria) Johannes Stuck	1–7
(Germany) Young Driver AMR	Aston Martin V12 Vantage	33	(Denmark) Christoffer Nygaard	All
(Germany) Young Driver AMR	Aston Martin V12 Vantage	33	(Denmark) Kristian Poulsen	All
(Germany) YACO Racing powered by Jochen Schweizer	Chevrolet Camaro GT3	34	(Germany) Max Sandritter	All
(Germany) YACO Racing powered by Jochen Schweizer	Chevrolet Camaro GT3	34	(Germany) Philip Geipel	1, 2, 5–8
(Germany) YACO Racing powered by Jochen Schweizer	Chevrolet Camaro GT3	34	(Germany) Christian Bracke	3, 4
(Germany) YACO Racing powered by Jochen Schweizer	Chevrolet Camaro GT3	35	(Germany) Charlie Geipel	1–4
(Germany) YACO Racing powered by Jochen Schweizer	Chevrolet Camaro GT3	35	(Germany) Achim Winter	1–4
(Germany) / Team Geyer & Weinig EDV-Unternehmensberatung; (Germany) / Schütz Motorsport	Porsche 911 GT3 R	36	(Germany) Christian Engelhart	All
(Germany) / Team Geyer & Weinig EDV-Unternehmensberatung; (Germany) / Schütz Motorsport	Porsche 911 GT3 R	36	(United Kingdom) Nick Tandy	1–3, 5–7
(Germany) / Team Geyer & Weinig EDV-Unternehmensberatung; (Germany) / Schütz Motorsport	Porsche 911 GT3 R	36	(United Kingdom) Sean Edwards	4, 8
(Germany) Gemballa Racing	McLaren MP4-12C GT3	37	(Germany) Sascha Bert	1–7
(Germany) Gemballa Racing	McLaren MP4-12C GT3	37	(Germany) Luca Ludwig	1–3
(Germany) Gemballa Racing	McLaren MP4-12C GT3	37	(Germany) Christopher Brück	4–7
(Germany) Lambda Performance	Ford GT GT3	38	(Finland) Jesse Krohn	1–6
(Germany) Lambda Performance	Ford GT GT3	38	(Belgium) Nico Verdonck	1–6
(Germany) Lambda Performance	Ford GT GT3	39	(Germany) Riccardo Brutschin	8
(Germany) Lambda Performance	Ford GT GT3	39	(Italy) Francesco Lopez	8
(Germany) Mamerow Racing	Audi R8 LMS ultra	40	(Germany) Christian Mamerow	1, 3–8
(Germany) Mamerow Racing	Audi R8 LMS ultra	40	(Austria) Bernd Herndlhofer	1
(Germany) Mamerow Racing	Audi R8 LMS ultra	40	(Germany) René Rast	3–5, 8
(Germany) Mamerow Racing	Audi R8 LMS ultra	40	(Germany) Christopher Haase	6
(Germany) Mamerow Racing	Audi R8 LMS ultra	40	(Germany) Frank Stippler	7
(Netherlands) DB Motorsport	BMW Z4 GT3	41	(Netherlands) Jeroen Den Boer	All
(Netherlands) DB Motorsport	BMW Z4 GT3	41	(Netherlands) Simon Knap	All
(Germany) SMS Seyffarth Motorsport	Mercedes-Benz SLS AMG GT3	42	(Germany) Jan Seyffarth	1–4, 6
(Germany) SMS Seyffarth Motorsport	Mercedes-Benz SLS AMG GT3	42	(Germany) Maximilian Mayer	1–4
(Germany) SMS Seyffarth Motorsport	Mercedes-Benz SLS AMG GT3	42	(Austria) Karl Wendlinger	6
(Austria) GRT Grasser Racing	Lamborghini Gallardo LP600+	43	(Austria) Gottfried Grasser	1, 2, 4–6
(Austria) GRT Grasser Racing	Lamborghini Gallardo LP600+	43	(Austria) Mario Dablander	1
(Austria) GRT Grasser Racing	Lamborghini Gallardo LP600+	43	(Czech Republic) Tomáš Enge	2
(Austria) GRT Grasser Racing	Lamborghini Gallardo LP600+	43	(Luxembourg) Daniel Bohr	4
(Austria) GRT Grasser Racing	Lamborghini Gallardo LP600+	43	(Italy) Andrea Piccini	5
(Austria) GRT Grasser Racing	Lamborghini Gallardo LP600+	43	(Germany) Carsten Seifert	6
(Germany) HEICO Gravity-Charouz Team	Mercedes-Benz SLS AMG GT3	44	(Czech Republic) Erik Janiš	All
(Germany) HEICO Gravity-Charouz Team	Mercedes-Benz SLS AMG GT3	44	(Czech Republic) Jan Stovicek	All
(Belgium) Mühlner Motorsport	Chevrolet Camaro GT	50	(Germany) Roland Asch	5
(Belgium) Mühlner Motorsport	Chevrolet Camaro GT	50	(United Kingdom) Oliver Gavin	5
(Belgium) Mühlner Motorsport	Porsche 911 GT3 R	50	(Germany) Marcel Lasée	8
(Belgium) Mühlner Motorsport	Porsche 911 GT3 R	50	(Germany) Jörg van Ommen	8

== Race calendar and results ==
Round		Circuit	Date	Pole	Winner
1	R1	(Germany) Motorsport Arena Oschersleben	30 March	No. 21 Prosperia uhc speed	No. 1 Alpina
1	R1	(Germany) Motorsport Arena Oschersleben	30 March	(Germany) Christer Jöns (Germany) Christopher Mies	(France) Dino Lunardi (Belgium) Maxime Martin
1	R2	(Germany) Motorsport Arena Oschersleben	1 April	No. 1 Alpina	No. 36 Team Geyer&Weinig EDV Schütz M
1	R2	(Germany) Motorsport Arena Oschersleben	1 April	(France) Dino Lunardi (Belgium) Maxime Martin	(Germany) Christian Engelhart (United Kingdom) Nick Tandy
2	R1	(Netherlands) Circuit Park Zandvoort	5 May	No. 28 Callaway Competition	No. 28 Callaway Competition
2	R1	(Netherlands) Circuit Park Zandvoort	5 May	(Italy) Diego Alessi (Germany) Daniel Keilwitz	(Italy) Diego Alessi (Germany) Daniel Keilwitz
2	R2	(Netherlands) Circuit Park Zandvoort	6 May	No. 41 DB Motorsport	No. 41 DB Motorsport
2	R2	(Netherlands) Circuit Park Zandvoort	6 May	(Netherlands) Jeroen den Boer (Netherlands) Simon Knap	(Netherlands) Jeroen den Boer (Netherlands) Simon Knap
3	R1	(Germany) Sachsenring	9 June	No. 28 Callaway Competition	No. 28 Callaway Competition
3	R1	(Germany) Sachsenring	9 June	(Italy) Diego Alessi (Germany) Daniel Keilwitz	(Italy) Diego Alessi (Germany) Daniel Keilwitz
3	R2	(Germany) Sachsenring	10 June	No. 28 Callaway Competition	No. 33 Young Driver AMR
3	R2	(Germany) Sachsenring	10 June	(Italy) Diego Alessi (Germany) Daniel Keilwitz	(Denmark) Christoffer Nygaard (Denmark) Kristian Poulsen
4	R1	(Germany) Nürburgring	14 July	No. 5 kfzteile24 MS Racing Team	No. 40 Mamerow Racing
4	R1	(Germany) Nürburgring	14 July	(Germany) Sebastian Asch (Germany) Maximilian Götz	(Germany) Christian Mamerow (Germany) René Rast
4	R2	(Germany) Nürburgring	15 July	No. 5 kfzteile24 MS Racing Team	No. 1 Alpina
4	R2	(Germany) Nürburgring	15 July	(Germany) Sebastian Asch (Germany) Maximilian Götz	(France) Dino Lunardi (Belgium) Maxime Martin
5	R1	(Austria) Red Bull Ring	11 August	No. 6 Farnbacher ESET Racing	No. 36 Team Geyer&Weinig EDV Schütz M
5	R1	(Austria) Red Bull Ring	11 August	(Germany) Mario Farnbacher (Germany) Niclas Kentenich	(Germany) Christian Engelhart (United Kingdom) Nick Tandy
5	R2	(Austria) Red Bull Ring	12 August	No. 14 MRS GT-Racing	No. 6 Farnbacher ESET Racing
5	R2	(Austria) Red Bull Ring	12 August	(Austria) Philipp Eng (Germany) Christian Ott	(Germany) Mario Farnbacher (Germany) Niclas Kentenich
6	R1	(Germany) Lausitzring	25 August	No. 36 Team Geyer&Weinig EDV Schütz M	No. 36 Team Geyer&Weinig EDV Schütz M
6	R1	(Germany) Lausitzring	25 August	(Germany) Christian Engelhart (United Kingdom) Nick Tandy	(Germany) Christian Engelhart (United Kingdom) Nick Tandy
6	R2	(Germany) Lausitzring	26 August	No. 15 FACH AUTO TECH	No. 36 Team Geyer&Weinig EDV Schütz M
6	R2	(Germany) Lausitzring	26 August	(Germany) Swen Dolenc (Austria) Martin Ragginger	(Germany) Christian Engelhart (United Kingdom) Nick Tandy
7	R1	(Germany) Nürburgring	15 September	No. 28 Callaway Competition	No. 1 Alpina
7	R1	(Germany) Nürburgring	15 September	(Italy) Diego Alessi (Germany) Daniel Keilwitz	(France) Dino Lunardi (Belgium) Maxime Martin
7	R2	(Germany) Nürburgring	16 September	No. 1 Alpina	No. 28 Callaway Competition
7	R2	(Germany) Nürburgring	16 September	(France) Dino Lunardi (Belgium) Maxime Martin	(Italy) Diego Alessi (Germany) Daniel Keilwitz
8	R1	(Germany) Hockenheimring	29 September	No. 36 Team Geyer&Weinig EDV Schütz M	No. 20 Schubert Motorsport
8	R1	(Germany) Hockenheimring	29 September	(Germany) Christian Engelhart (United Kingdom) Sean Edwards	(Germany) Claudia Hürtgen (Germany) Dominik Schwager
8	R2	(Germany) Hockenheimring	30 September	No. 15 FACH AUTO TECH	No. 5 kfzteile24 MS Racing Team
8	R2	(Germany) Hockenheimring	30 September	(Germany) Swen Dolenc (Austria) Martin Ragginger	(Germany) Sebastian Asch (Germany) Maximilian Götz

== Standings ==
Pos	Driver	OSC (Germany)		ZAN (Netherlands)		SAC (Germany)		NÜR (Germany)		RBR (Austria)		LAU (Germany)		NÜR (Germany)		HOC (Germany)		Pts
1	(Germany) Sebastian Asch (Germany) Maximilian Götz	9	7	2	3	3	14	**7**	**2**	9	11	2	4	3	3	26	1	167
2	(Italy) Diego Alessi (Germany) Daniel Keilwitz	Ret	3	**1**	6	**1**	**4**	33	Ret	6	26	26	3	**2**	1	Ret	9	153
3	(Germany) Christian Engelhart	5	1	18	Ret	Ret	23	3	4	1	25	**1**	1	7	10	**13**	16	144
4	(France) Dino Lunardi (Belgium) Maxime Martin	1	**4**	5	27	11	16	2	1	13	18	23	19	1	**2**	18	10	134
5	(Germany) Claudia Hürtgen (Germany) Dominik Schwager	2	11	16	2	Ret	6	6	6	17	10	8	2	14	7	1	4	126
6	(Germany) Robert Renauer	3	13	3	Ret	14	10	19	7	2	2	3	11	8	12	2	3	125
7	(United Kingdom) Nick Tandy	5	1	18	Ret	Ret	23			1	25	**1**	1	7	10			117
8	(France) Nicolas Armindo					14	10			2	2	3	11	8	12	2	3	89
9	(Austria) Dominik Baumann (Austria) Harald Proczyk	6	6	8	11	5	18	8	11	7	Ret	5	14	Ret	Ret	4	2	80
10	(Netherlands) Jeroen den Boer (Netherlands) Simon Knap	17	8	2	**1**	19	9	22	34	21	17	17	9	4	27	7	7	75
11	(Germany) Maximilian Buhk (Sweden) Andreas Simonsen	20	5	13	9	7	12	9	8	Ret	9	6	5	5	5	24	6	72
12	(Finland) Jesse Krohn (Belgium) Nico Verdonck	4	Ret	4	Ret	2	Ret	Ret	18	10	3	11	Ret					58
13	(Denmark) Christoffer Nygaard (Denmark) Kristian Poulsen	8	16	Ret	5	4	1	13	9	18	27	16	15	9	15	Ret	11	55
14	(Germany) Mario Farnbacher (Germany) Niclas Kentenich	13	Ret	12	25	DNS	DNS	10	33	**3**	1	4	10	13	28	Ret	Ret	54
15	(Germany) Christian Mamerow	21	12	DNS	DNS	15	7	1	3	30	DNS	Ret	DNS	24	8	17	8	54
16	(Germany) René Rast					15	7	1	3	30	DNS					17	8	50
17	(Germany) Heinz-Harald Frentzen	34	Ret	Ret	7	6	Ret	37	22	5	4	Ret	DNS	Ret	6	8	15	48
18	(Germany) Lance David Arnold (Greece) Alexandros Margaritis	24	9	Ret	10	30	Ret	5	12	12	7	10	7	28	20	5	5	46
19	(Germany) Andreas Wirth	34	Ret	Ret	7	6	Ret	37	22	5	4	Ret	DNS			8	15	40
20	(Germany) Christopher Mies	**18**	Ret	DNS	8	9	2	38	14	24	8	Ret	6	10	26	9	27	39
21	(Germany) Swen Dolenc (Austria) Martin Ragginger	19	10	11	21	16	11	11	5	4	12	7	**27**	12	9	6	**26**	39
22	(Germany) Daniel Dobitsch (Germany) Florian Stoll	7	27	9	24	13	Ret	24	15	11	Ret	9	8	6	14	3	Ret	37
23	(Sweden) Edward Sandström					9	2	38	14	24	8	Ret	6	10	26	9	27	35
24	(United Kingdom) Sean Edwards							3	4							**13**	16	27
25	(Netherlands) Christiaan Frankenhout (Germany) Kenneth Heyer	15	7	14	Ret	8	13	4	10	16	Ret	13	12	27	13	12	12	23
26	(Denmark) Nicki Thiim	3	13					19	7							Ret	Ret	21
27	(Germany) Ferdinand Stuck (Germany) Johannes Stuck	Ret	15	6	Ret	Ret	Ret	15	26	14	Ret	DNS	DNS	DSQ	4			20
28	(Germany) Frank Kechele (Switzerland) Toni Seiler	22	21	17	13	10	5	28	23	Ret	6	21	13	26	Ret	27	13	19
29	(Saudi Arabia) Abdulaziz Al Faisal (Italy) Mirko Bortolotti					25	3	14	16									15
30	(Netherlands) Jeroen Bleekemolen			3	Ret													15
31	(Germany) Sascha Bert	11	29	21	Ret	Ret	20	30	20	8	5	15	17	DNS	DNS			14
32	(Germany) Christopher Brück							30	20	8	5	15	17	DNS	DNS			14
33	(Germany) Christian Abt	16	19	19	4	23	Ret	29	Ret	25	Ret	18	25	17	Ret	15	Ret	12
34	(Germany) Carsten Tilke	16	19	19	4	23	Ret			25	Ret	18	25	17	Ret	15	Ret	12
35	(Netherlands) Henry Zumbrink													Ret	6			8
36	(Germany) Jan Seyffarth	12	14	15	12	12	8	18	17			27	23					4
37	(Germany) Maximilian Mayer	12	14	15	12	12	8	18	17									4
38	(Germany) Christer Jöns	**18**	Ret	DNS	8													4
39	(Germany) Frank Stippler													24	8			4
40	(Sweden) Fredrik Lestrup	14	Ret	10	Ret	17	30	16	19	31	16	14	Ret	11	11			1
41	(Czech Republic) Martin Matzke	14	Ret	10	Ret	17	30	16	19									1
42	(Switzerland) Fredy Barth											Ret	28	21	18	10	14	1
43	(Austria) Philipp Eng					Ret	DNS	35	25	Ret	**Ret**					10	14	1
44	(Germany) Christian Ott	10	Ret	32	22	Ret	DNS	35	25	Ret	**Ret**	Ret	28					1
45	(Germany) Alex Müller	10	Ret	32	22													1
	(Sweden) Daniel Roos													11	11			0
	(Switzerland) Raffael Bader	25	18	23	15	20	Ret	12	13	22	19	Ret	Ret	20	17	11	28	0
	(Germany) David Mengesdorf	25	18	23	15	20	Ret	12	13			Ret	Ret	20	17	11	28	0
	(Germany) Luca Ludwig	11	29	21	Ret	Ret	20	29	Ret									0
	(Germany) René Bourdeaux (Germany) Alfred Renauer	33	DNS	22	14	28	21	20	21	Ret	13	12	16	15	Ret	16	17	0
	(Austria) Bernd Herndlhofer	21	12	DNS	DNS													0
	(Switzerland) Remo Lips	27	22	33	16	Ret	19	25	27	Ret	23	20	20	Ret	19	14	23	0
	(Germany) Frank Schmickler	27	22	33	16	Ret	19	25	27			20	20	Ret	19	14	23	0
	(Germany) Johannes Leidinger (Germany) Florian Spengler	28	Ret	34	20	21	27	23	24	19	14	25	26	16	21	Ret	25	0
	(Sweden) Martin Öhlin									31	16	14	Ret					0
	(Germany) Georg Engelhardt	31	17	26	Ret	22	22	34	Ret	15	Ret	19	18	19	16	Ret	Ret	0
	(Germany) Marco Seefried	31	17	26	Ret	22	22	34	Ret	15	Ret	19	18	19	16			0
	(Germany) Michael Schulze (Germany) Tobias Schulze	36	23	27	28	18	15	17	28	DNS	DNS	22	Ret					0
	(Netherlands) Peter Kox	23	Ret	20	23	29	17	DNS	DNS	Ret	DNS							0
	(Netherlands) Dennis Retera					29	17											0
	(Czech Republic) Erik Janiš (Czech Republic) Jan Šťovíček	35	24	Ret	DNS	27	28	32	31			Ret	29	18	24	21	21	0
	(United Kingdom) Robert Bell													21	18			0
	(Austria) Gottfried Grasser	26	26	28	18			26	35	Ret	20	Ret	24					0
	(Germany) Max Sandritter	Ret	Ret	24	Ret	26	26	36	32	27	24			22	22	Ret	18	0
	(Germany) Philip Geipel	Ret	Ret	24	Ret					27	24					Ret	18	0
	(Czech Republic) Tomáš Enge			28	18													0
	(Germany) Riccardo Brutschin (Italy) Francesco Lopez															19	19	0
	(Switzerland) Andrina Gugger (Germany) Otto Klohs	30	25	29	19	24	24	27	29	20	21	24	22	23	23	22	22	0
	(Austria) Peter Ebner									22	19							0
	(Slovakia) Štefan Rosina (Germany) Albert von Thurn und Taxis	Ret	20	25	27			21	30	23	22							0
	(Switzerland) Marc A. Hayek	23	Ret	20	23			DNS	DNS	Ret	DNS							0
	(Germany) Maximilian Partl (Germany) Jörg Weidinger															23	20	0
	(Italy) Andrea Piccini									Ret	20							0
	(Germany) Marcel Lasée (Germany) Jörg van Ommen															20	Ret	0
	(Germany) Charlie Geipel	29	Ret	30	29	Ret	25	31	Ret	DNS	DNS			22	22			0
	(Austria) Mario Dablander	26	26							Ret	23							0
	(Austria) Karl Wendlinger											27	23					0
	(Russia) Oleg Petrishin	32	28	31	26	Ret	29	Ret	36	29	Ret			25	25	25	24	0
	(Austria) Gerhard Tweraser	32	28	31	26											25	24	0
	(Germany) Carsten Seifert											Ret	24					0
	(Russia) Sergey Afanasyev													25	25			0
	(Germany) Achim Winter	29	Ret	30	29	Ret	25	31	Ret	DNS	DNS							0
	(Germany) Christian Bracke					26	26	36	32									0
	(Luxembourg) Daniel Bohr							26	35									0
	(Germany) Wolfgang Hageleit (Germany) Sven Heyrowski									28	Ret							0
	(Germany) Roland Asch (United Kingdom) Oliver Gavin									Ret	28							0
	(Germany) Korbinian Baier					Ret	29	Ret	36	29	Ret							0
	(Germany) Christopher Haase											Ret	DNS					0
	(Germany) Norbert Janz (Germany) Christoph Schrezenmeier											Ret	DNS					0
	(Netherlands) Patrick Huisman (Germany) Erwin Stückle	DNS	DNS															0
Pos	Driver	OSC (Germany)		ZAN (Netherlands)		SAC (Germany)		NÜR (Germany)		RBR (Austria)		LAU (Germany)		NÜR (Germany)		HOC (Germany)		Pts

Colour	Result
Gold	Winner
Silver	Second place
Bronze	Third place
Green	Points classification
Blue	Non-points classification
Blue	Non-classified finish (NC)
Purple	Retired, not classified (Ret)
Red	Did not qualify (DNQ)
Red	Did not pre-qualify (DNPQ)
Black	Disqualified (DSQ)
White	Did not start (DNS)
White	Withdrew (WD)
White	Race cancelled (C)
Blank	Did not practice (DNP)
Blank	Did not arrive (DNA)
Blank	Excluded (EX)

**Bold** – Pole
Italics – Fastest Lap
