= Martin Ragginger =

Austrian racing driver (born 1988)

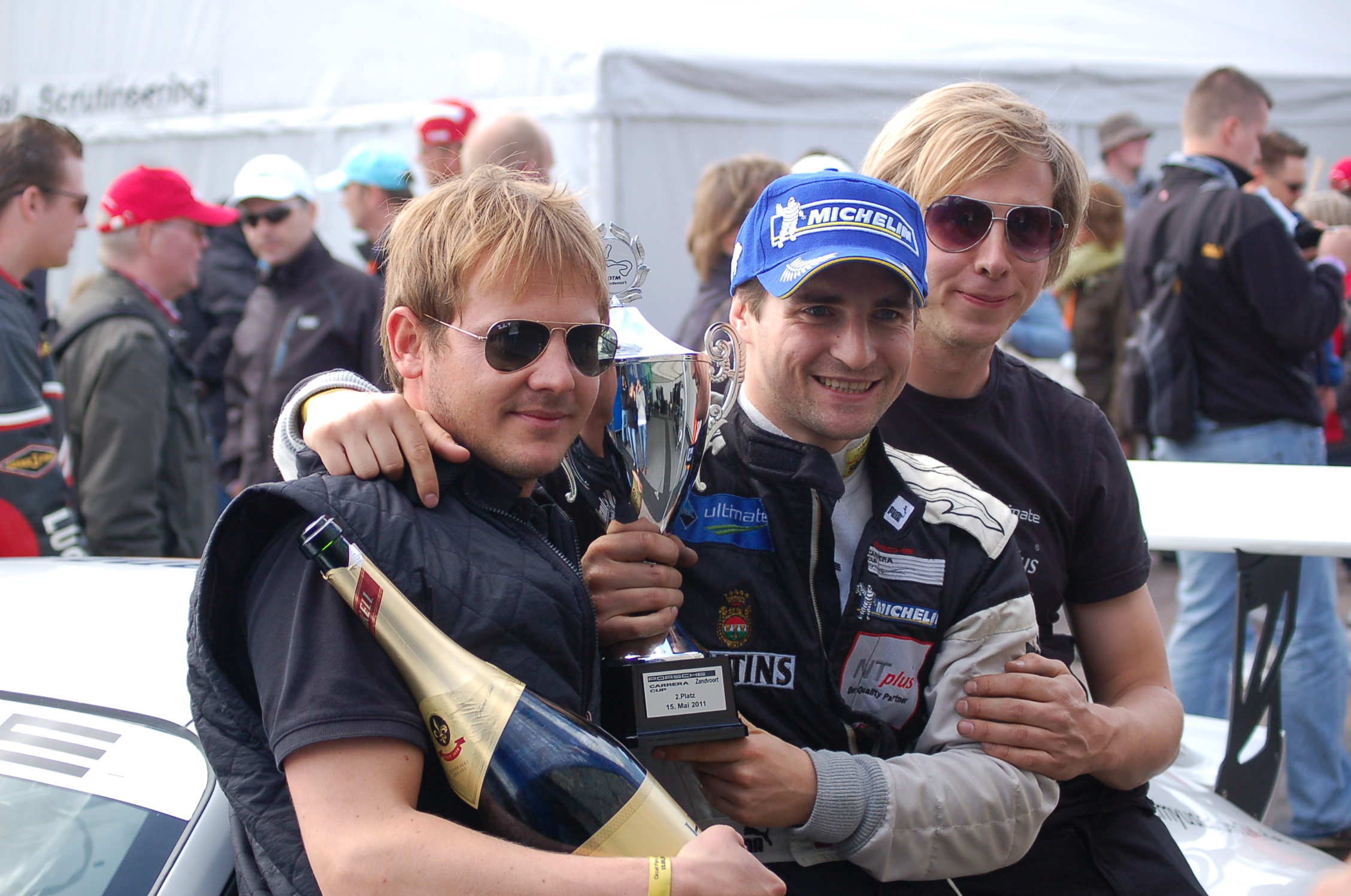
- Ragginger (center) in 2011
- Nationality: (Austria) Austrian
- Born: 29 March 1988 (age 38) Wals-Siezenheim, Austria
- Categorisation: FIA Gold

Awards
- 2013: Porsche Cup

Martin Ragginger (born 29 March 1988 in Wals-Siezenheim) is an Austrian racing driver who last competed for Neuhofer Rennsport in the 24H Series Middle East.

A Red Bull and Porsche junior in his youth, Ragginger has tasted success in the ADAC GT Masters, and won the 24 Hours of Spa overall in 2010 aged only 22. He has raced for Falken Motorsports in both the American Le Mans Series and Nürburgring 24 Hours.

== Career ==
Ragginger began karting in 1999. During his time in karts, Ragginger joined the Red Bull Junior Team in 2002 and stayed with them as he made his single-seater debut in 2005 in Formula BMW ADAC. Spending two seasons in the series, Ragginger finished eighth in points in both seasons, scoring two wins in his sophomore campaign before leaving single-seaters and the Red Bull Junior Team.

Switching to sports car racing for 2007, Ragginger became a member of the Porsche Junior Team ahead of his maiden season in Porsche Carrera Cup Germany. In three years as a Porsche junior, Ragginger most notably finished 11th in the GT2 standings of the 2009 FIA GT Championship after sharing the car with Emmanuel Collard at the season-ending round at Zolder.

Despite leaving the Porsche Junior Team in 2010, Ragginger drove for Porsche-fielding teams that year in various one-off appearances, most notably winning the 24 Hours of Spa with BMS Scuderia Italia. That year, Ragginger's main programmes were in Porsche Carrera Cup Germany and the GT2 class of the Le Mans Series, in which he finished fifth and third, with four podiums in the former and a lone podium at Le Castellet in the latter.

After another season consisting of one-off appearances for Porsche-fielding teams, Ragginger made his full-season debut in ADAC GT Masters and Porsche Carrera Cup Asia in 2012. In maiden season in both series, Ragginger scored two pole positions and a best result of fourth in the former, whilst taking two wins in the latter on his way to fourth.

Returning to both championships for 2013, Ragginger remained with Team Eagle to compete in Carrera Cup Asia, whilst switching to Tonino powered by Herberth Motorsport for ADAC GT Masters. In Asia, Ragginger won five races and was once again runner-up in points, before finishing third in the Invitational race at Macau. In the latter, Ragginger took his maiden ADAC GT Masters win at Lausitzring on his way to fourth in points despite missing one round. During 2013, Ragginger won the A6 Am class of the Dubai 24 Hour and was given the Porsche Cup trophy for being the highest-scoring privateer Porsche driver during the year.

After coming runner-up in Carrera Cup Asia and making part-time appearances in ADAC GT Masters the following year, Ragginger returned to both championships in 2015. Racing for Team Porsche Holding in the former, Ragginger scored a lone win and ended the season fifth in points despite missing four races. In ADAC GT Masters, Ragginger raced for Schütz Motorsport, with whom he finished 13th in points with, after scoring three podiums in five rounds he competed in. Also during 2015, Ragginger finished third overall in the 24 Hours of Nürburgring and won on his Trans-Am debut in the TA3-I class.

For 2016, Ragginger switched to Herberth Motorsport for ADAC GT Masters, whilst remaining with Porsche Holding in Carrera Cup Asia and Falken Motorsports in the Nürburgring Langstrecken-Serie. In the former, Ragginger won at the Lausitzring and Hockenheimring to finish fifth in points alongside Robert Renauer. In Asia, Ragginger won at Marina Bay and Shanghai en route to a ninth-place points finish. During 2016, Ragginger also finished ninth in the 24 Hours of Nürburgring with Falken Motorsports.

Ragginger then shifted his focus to Asia for 2017, racing in both Porsche Carrera Cup Asia and the China GT Championship. Taking four wins in the former, Ragginger ended the season runner-up to Chris van der Drift, whilst finishing fifth in the China GT Championship. In the following two seasons, Ragginger stayed in Porsche Carrera Cup Asia, finishing third and second in the points in 2018 and 2019, respectively. During these three seasons, Ragginger, who had been racing with Falken Motorsports since 2010, kept his role as a driver in both the Nürburgring Langstrecken-Serie and the 24 Hours of Nürburgring.

Following that, Ragginger mostly remained with Falken Motorsports across the next three seasons in both the Nürburgring Langstrecken-Serie and the 24 Hours of Nürburgring. In 2020, Ragginger also returned to the Trans-Am Series, taking a win at Road Atlanta in his fourth start in the series.

Ragginger then returned in Porsche Carrera Cup Asia across the next two years for Team Porsche Holding, finishing fourth in both seasons and scoring just two wins, both coming in 2024. Ragginger also retained his drive with Falken Motorsports in the Nürburgring Langstrecken-Serie, taking a lone win in 2024 at the second 24h Nurburgring qualifier race. In early 2026, Ragginger raced at the Dubai 24 Hour for Neuhofer Rennsport in the 992 class.

== Karting record ==
=== Karting career summary ===
Season	Series	Team	Position
1999	Torneo Delle Industrie Open — Mini		17th
2000	Torneo Delle Industrie Open — 100 Junior		26th
2001	Deutsche Kart-Meisterschaft — Junior	KSN Official Racing Team	4th
2001	Italian Open Masters — ICA Junior	KSN Official Racing Team	23rd
2001	Green Helmet Trophy — Cadets	KSN Official Racing Team	24th
2002	Deutsche Kart-Meisterschaft — Junior	KSN Official Racing Team	16th
2002	Italian Open Masters — ICA Junior	KSN Official Racing Team	16th
2002	Grand Prix Karting FFSA — Junior		17th
2003	Karting European Championship Central Region Qualification — ICA	KSN Official Racing Team	7th
2003	Karting European Championship — ICA	KSN Official Racing Team	15th
2004	South Garda Winter Cup — ICA	KSN Official Racing Team	22nd
2004	Deutsche Kart-Meisterschaft — Senior	KSN Official Racing Team	3rd
2004	Karting European Championship — ICA	KSN Official Racing Team	13th

== Racing record ==
=== Racing career summary ===
Season	Series	Team	Races	Wins	Poles	F/Laps	Podiums	Points	Position
2005	Formula BMW ADAC	Mücke Motorsport	20	0	0	0	1	78	8th
2006	Formula Renault 2.0 UK Winter Series	Mark Burdett Motorsport	4	0	1	0	0	0	NC
2006	Formula BMW ADAC	ADAC Berlin-Brandenburg	10	0	0	1	2	91	8th
2006	Formula BMW ADAC	Eifelland Racing	6	2	0	2	4	91	8th
2006	Formula BMW World Final	Eifelland Racing	1	0	0	0	0	—N/a	9th
2007	Porsche Carrera Cup Germany	UPS Porsche-Junior Team	9	0	0	0	0	43	13th
2007	Porsche Supercup	UPS Porsche-Junior Team	6	0	0	0	0	0	NC
2008	American Le Mans Series – GT2	Flying Lizard Motorsports	1	0	0	0	0	10	49th
2008	Rolex Sports Car Series – GT	The Racer's Group	1	0	0	0	0	3	91st
2008	Porsche Carrera Cup Germany	UPS Porsche-Junior Team	8	0	0	0	1	90	7th
2008	Porsche Supercup	UPS Porsche-Junior Team	6	0	0	0	1	0	NC
2008	24 Hours of Nürburgring – SP7	Manthey Racing	1	0	0	0	0	—N/a	4th
2009	Rolex Sports Car Series – GT	Autometric Motorsports	1	0	0	0	0	5	79th
2009	FIA GT Championship – GT2	Brixia Racing	8	0	2	1	0	18	11th
2009	24 Hours of Nürburgring – SP7	Wochenspiegel Team Manthey	1	0	0	0	0	—N/a	DNF
2009	American Le Mans Series – GT2	Farnbacher-Loles Motorsports	2	0	0	0	0	6	49th
2009	FIA GT3 European Championship	Trackspeed	2	0	0	0	0	0	NC
2010	Rolex Sports Car Series – GT	Alex Job Racing	1	0	0	0	0	19	53rd
2010	Porsche Carrera Cup Germany	Schnabl Engineering	9	0	0	0	4	79	5th
2010	Porsche Supercup	Schnabl Engineering Parker Racing	1	0	0	0	0	0	NC
2010	FIA GT3 European Championship	Trackspeed	2	0	0	0	0	0	NC
2010	Le Mans Series – GT2	Team Felbermayr Proton	5	0	0	0	1	55	**3rd**
2010	24 Hours of Spa – GT2	BMS Scuderia Italia	1	1	0	0	1	—N/a	**1st**
2010	American Le Mans Series – GT	Team Falken Tire	1	0	0	0	0	12	33rd
2011	Rolex Sports Car Series – GT	Burtin Racing	1	0	0	0	0	16	57th
2011	Dubai 24 Hour – A6	De Lorenzi Racing	1	0	0	0	0	—N/a	NC
2011	Porsche Carrera Cup Germany	Schnabl Engineering	7	0	0	0	1	75	7th
2011	Porsche Carrera World Cup	Schnabl Engineering	1	0	0	0	0	—N/a	8th
2011	24 Hours of Nürburgring – SP9 GT3	Falken Motorsports	1	0	0	0	0	—N/a	15th
2011	ADAC GT Masters	Mühlner Motorsport	2	0	0	0	0	0	NC
2011	American Le Mans Series – GT	Team Falken Tire	1	0	0	0	0	20	21st
2012	Dubai 24 Hour – A6	Fach Auto Tech	1	0	0	0	0	—N/a	5th
2012	ADAC GT Masters	Fach Auto Tech	18	0	2	2	0	39	21st
2012	Rolex Sports Car Series – GT	Burtin Racing with Goldcrest Motorsports	3	0	0	0	0	55	38th
2012	American Le Mans Series – GT	Team Falken Tire	2	0	0	0	0	17	20th
2012	American Le Mans Series – GTC	JDX Racing	2	0	0	0	1	18	23rd
2012	Porsche Carrera Cup Asia	Team Eagle – Jiejun & Junbaojie	11	2	2	3	5	133	4th
2012	24 Hours of Nürburgring – SP9 GT3	Falken Motorsports	1	0	0	0	0	—N/a	DNF
2013	Dubai 24 Hour – A6 Am	Fach Auto Tech	1	1	0	0	1	—N/a	**1st**
2013	Porsche Supercup	Fach Auto Tech	3	0	0	0	0	14	19th
2013	Blancpain Endurance Series – Pro-Am	Fach Auto Tech	1	0	0	0	0	2	37th
2013	Rolex Sports Car Series – GT	Burtin Racing with Goldcrest Motorsports	1	0	0	0	0	21	57th
2013	ADAC GT Masters	Tonino powered by Herberth Motorsport	14	1	1	1	4	154	4th
2013	Porsche Carrera Cup Asia	Team Eagle – Jiejun & Junbaojie	12	5	7	3	10	198	**2nd**
2013	Italian GT Championship	Tonino Motorsport	2	0	0	0	2	27	12th
2013	VLN Series – SP9	Falken Motorsports	4	0	0	0	1	0	NC
2013	24 Hours of Nürburgring – SP9	Falken Motorsports	1	0	0	0	0	—N/a	16th
2013	FIA GT Series	Trackspeed	1	0	0	0	0	0	NC
2014	Dubai 24 Hour – A6 Pro	Fach Auto Tech	1	0	0	0	0	—N/a	10th
2014	Blancpain Endurance Series – Pro-Am	Fach Auto Tech	1	0	0	0	0	0	NC
2014	Porsche Carrera Cup Asia	Team Porsche Holding	11	2	2	2	8	171	**2nd**
2014	ADAC GT Masters	GW IT Racing Team Schütz Motorsport	2	0	0	0	1	50	19th
2014	ADAC GT Masters	Tonino Team Herberth	2	0	0	0	1	50	19th
2014	VLN Series – SP9	Falken Motorsports	5	0	0	0	1	0	NC
2014	24 Hours of Nürburgring – SP9	Falken Motorsports	1	0	0	0	0	—N/a	4th
2014	GT Sprint Series	Schütz Motorsport	2	0	0	0	0	12	20th
2015	United SportsCar Championship – GTD	Magnus Racing	1	0	0	0	0	22	49th
2015	Dubai 24 Hour – A6 Pro	Fach Auto Tech	1	0	0	0	0	—N/a	DNF
2015	GT Sprint Series – Pro-Am	Fach Auto Tech	2	0	1	0	2	22	7th
2015	24H Series – A6	Fach Auto Tech	1	0	0	0	0	0	NC
2015	ADAC GT Masters	GW IT Racing Team Schütz Motorsport	12	0	2	1	3	85	13th
2015	Porsche Carrera Cup Asia	Team Porsche Holding	9	1	3	2	8	159	5th
2015	VLN Series – SP9	Falken Motorsports	3	0	0	0	0	0	NC
2015	24 Hours of Nürburgring – SP9	Falken Motorsports	1	0	0	0	1	—N/a	**3rd**
2015	Trans-Am Series – TA3-I		1	1	0	1	1	32	15th
2016	ADAC GT Masters	Precote Herberth Motorsport	14	2	1	1	4	123	5th
2016	Porsche Carrera Cup Asia	Team Porsche Holding	7	2	1	1	4	110	9th
2016	VLN Series – SP9	Falken Motorsports	3	0	0	0	2	0	NC
2016	24 Hours of Nürburgring – SP9	Falken Motorsports	1	0	0	0	0	—N/a	9th
2017	24H Series – SPX	Fach Auto Tech	1	0	0	0	1	24	NC
2017	China GT Championship – GT3	FAW T2M	12	0	2	1	6	116	5th
2017	Porsche Carrera Cup Asia	Team Porsche Holding	13	4	2	4	7	228	**2nd**
2017	Porsche Invitational Race – Sepang	Team Porsche Holding	1	0	0	0	0	—N/a	6th
2017	VLN Series – SP9	Falken Motorsports	4	0	0	0	2	0	NC
2017	24 Hours of Nürburgring – SP9	Falken Motorsports	1	0	0	0	0	—N/a	DNF
2017	Trans-Am Series – TA	Burtin Racing	2	0	1	0	1	46	22nd
2018	Porsche Carrera Cup Asia	Team Porsche Holding	13	3	2	3	9	197	**3rd**
2018	VLN Series – SP9	Falken Motorsports	4	2	0	0	3	13.19	20th
2018	24 Hours of Nürburgring – SP9	Falken Motorsports	1	0	0	0	0	—N/a	9th
2019	Porsche Carrera Cup Asia	Team Porsche Holding	14	5	1	4	10	202	**2nd**
2019	VLN Series – SP9	Falken Motorsports	5	0	0	0	0	24.14	10th
2019	24 Hours of Nürburgring – SP9	Falken Motorsports	1	0	0	0	0	—N/a	15th
2020	ADAC GT Masters	Space Drive Racing operated by KÜS Team75 Bernhard	2	0	0	0	0	0	NC
2020	Nürburgring Langstrecken-Serie – SP9 Pro	Falken Motorsports	2	0	0	0	0	0.75	93rd
2020	24 Hours of Nürburgring – SP9	Falken Motorsports	1	0	0	0	0	—N/a	10th
2020	Trans-Am Series – TA		2	1	1	1	2	64	11th
2021	Nürburgring Langstrecken-Serie – SP9 Pro	Falken Motorsports	4	0	0	0	3	0	NC
2021	24 Hours of Nürburgring – SP9	Falken Motorsports	1	0	0	0	0	—N/a	4th
2021	Nürburgring Langstrecken-Serie – SP9 Pro-Am	Frikadelli Racing Team	1	0	0	0	0	0	NC
2021	ADAC GT Masters	MRS GT-Racing	2	0	0	0	0	0	43rd
2022	Nürburgring Langstrecken-Serie – SP9 Pro	Falken Motorsports	4	0	0	0	0	0	NC
2022	24 Hours of Nürburgring – SP9 Pro	Falken Motorsports	1	0	0	0	0	—N/a	DNF
2022	Trans-Am Series – TA		1	0	0	0	0	18	21st
2023	Porsche Carrera Cup Asia	Team Porsche Holding	14	0	0	1	5	213	4th
2023	Nürburgring Langstrecken-Serie – SP9 Pro	Falken Motorsports	3	0	0	0	1	0	NC
2023	24 Hours of Nürburgring – SP9 Pro	Falken Motorsports	1	0	0	0	0	—N/a	8th
2023	24H GT Series – 992 Pro	Neuhofer Rennsport	2	0	0	0	0	0	NC
2023	Trans-Am Series – TA		1	0	0	0	1	101	16th
2023–24	Middle East Trophy – 992 Pro	Neuhofer Rennsport by MRS GT-Racing	1	0	0	0	0	0	NC
2024	Porsche Carrera Cup Asia	Team Porsche Holding	16	2	0	2	6	224	4th
2024	Nürburgring Langstrecken-Serie – SP9 Pro	Falken Motorsports	4	1	0	0	1	0	NC
2024	24 Hours of Nürburgring – SP9 Pro	Falken Motorsports	1	0	0	0	0	—N/a	9th
2024	Intercontinental GT Challenge	Falken Motorsports	1	0	0	0	0	6	21st
2024	992 Endurance Cup	Neuhofer Rennsport	1	0	0	0	0	—N/a	16th
2025–26	24H Series Middle East - 992	Neuhofer Rennsport	1	0	0	0	0	21	NC
2026	Trans-Am Series – TA								

=== Complete Formula BMW ADAC results ===
(key) (Races in bold indicate pole position, races in italics indicate fastest lap)

Year	Team	1	2	3	4	5	6	7	8	9	10	11	12	13	14	15	16	17	18	19	20	DC	Points
2005	Mücke Motorsport	HOC1; 1; 16	HOC1; 2; 16	LAU; 1; 7	LAU; 2; 5	SPA; 1; 10	SPA; 2; 4	NÜR1; 1; 5	NÜR1; 2; 12	BRN; 1; 7	BRN; 2; 10	OSC; 1; 10	OSC; 2; 12	NOR; 1 Ret	NOR; 2 Ret	NÜR2; 1; 9	NÜR2; 2; 6	ZAN; 1; 5	ZAN; 2; 4	HOC2; 1 Ret	HOC2; 2; 2	8th	78
2006	ADAC Berlin-Brandenburg	HOC; 1; 18†	HOC; 2 Ret	LAU; 1; 4	LAU; 2; 19†	NÜR; 1	NÜR; 2	OSC1; 1; 4	OSC1; 2; 10	OSC2; 1; 12	OSC2; 2; 11	NOR; 1; 11	NOR; 2; 8									8th	91
2006	Eifelland Racing													NÜR; 1; 3	NÜR; 2; 1	ZAN; 1 Ret	ZAN; 2 Ret	HOC; 1; 1	HOC; 2; 2			8th	91

=== Complete Porsche Supercup results ===
(key) (Races in bold indicate pole position) (Races in italics indicate fastest lap)

Year	Team	1	2	3	4	5	6	7	8	9	10	11	12	DC	Points
2007	UPS Porsche Junior Team	BHR	BHR	ESP; 9	MON	FRA; 5	GBR; 10	GER; Ret	HUN; Ret	TUR	ITA; 7	BEL; 5		NC	0‡
2008	UPS Porsche Junior Team	BHR	BHR	ESP; 3	TUR	MON	FRA	GBR; Ret	GER; 7	HUN; Ret	ESP	BEL; Ret	ITA; 22	NC	0‡
2010	Schnabl Engineering Parker Racing	BHR	BHR	ESP	MON	VAL	GBR	HOC	HUN	BEL; 7	MNZ			NC	0‡
2013	FACH Auto Tech	CAT	MON	SIL; 7	NÜR	HUN	SPA; 17	MNZ; 11	YMC	YMC				19th	14

‡ Guest Driver — Ineligible for points

=== Complete Grand-Am Rolex Sports Car Series results ===
(key) (Races in bold indicate pole position; results in italics indicate fastest lap)

Year	Team	Class	Make	Engine	1	2	3	4	5	6	7	8	9	10	11	12	13	Rank	Points
2008	The Racer's Group	GT	Porsche 911 GT3 Cup	Porsche 4.0L F6	DAY; 28	MIA	MEX	VIR	LAG	LIM	WGL	MOH	DAY	BAR	CGV	NJMP	MIL	91st	3
2009	Autometric Motorsports	GT	Porsche 911 GT3 Cup	Porsche 4.0L F6	DAY; 26	VIR	NJMP	LAG	WGL	MOH	DAY	BAR	WGL	CGV	MIL	MIA		79th	5
2010	Alex Job Racing	GT	Porsche 911 GT3 Cup	Porsche 4.0L F6	DAY; 12	MIA	BAR	VIR	LIM	WGL	MOH	DAY	NJMP	WGL	CGV	MIL		53rd	19
2011	Burtin Racing	GT	Porsche 911 GT3 Cup	Porsche 4.0L F6	DAY; 24	MIA	BAR	VIR	LIM	WGL	ELK	LAG	NJMP	WGL	CGV	MOH		57th	16
2012	Burtin Racing with Goldcrest Motorsports	GT	Porsche 911 GT3 Cup	Porsche 4.0L F6	DAY; 33	BAR	MIA	NJMP	BEL	MOH	ELK	WGL; 17	IMS; 6	WGL	CGV	LAG	LIM	38th	55
2013	Burtin Racing with Goldcrest Motorsports	GT	Porsche 911 GT3 Cup	Porsche 4.0L F6	DAY; 10	COA	BAR	ATL	BEL	MOH	WGL	IMS	ELK	KNS	LAG	LIM		57th	21

=== Complete American Le Mans Series results ===
(key) (Races in bold indicate pole position; results in italics indicate fastest lap)

Year	Team	Class	Make	Engine	1	2	3	4	5	6	7	8	9	10	11	Pos.	Points
2008	Flying Lizard Motorsports	GT2	Porsche 911 GT3 RSR	Porsche 3.8 L Flat-6	SEB	STP	LBH	UTA	LRP	MDO	ELK	MOS	DET; 4	PET	LAG	49th	10
2009	Farnbacher-Loles Motorsports	GT2	Porsche 911 GT3 RSR	Porsche 4.0 L Flat-6	SEB	STP	LBH	UTA	LRP	MDO; 6	ELK	MOS	PET	LAG		49th	6
2010	Team Falken Tire	GT	Porsche 911 GT3 RSR	Porsche 4.0 L Flat-6	SEB	LBH	LAG	UTA	LRP	MDO	ELK	MOS	PET; 10			33rd	12
2011	Team Falken Tire	GT	Porsche 911 GT3 RSR	Porsche 4.0 L Flat-6	SEB	LBH	LRP	MOS	MDO	ELK	BAL	LAG	PET; 5			21st	20
2012	Team Falken Tire	GT	Porsche 911 GT3 RSR	Porsche 4.0 L Flat-6	SEB; 7	LBH								PET; 10		20th	17
2012	JDX Racing	GTC	Porsche 997 GT3 Cup	Porsche 4.0 L Flat-6			LAG; 7	LRP	MOS	MDO	ELK	BAL	VIR; 2			23rd	18

^{†} Did not finish the race but was classified as his car completed more than 70% of the overall winner's race distance.

=== Complete FIA GT3 European Championship results ===
(key) (Races in bold indicate pole position; races in italics indicate fastest lap)

Year	Entrant	Chassis	Engine	1	2	3	4	5	6	7	8	9	10	11	12	Pos.	Points
2009	Trackspeed	Porsche 997 GT3 Cup S	Porsche 4.0 L Flat-6	SIL; 1	SIL; 2	ADR; 1	ADR; 2	OSC; 1	OSC; 2	ALG; 1	ALG; 2	LEC; 1; 20	LEC; 2; 16	ZOL; 1	ZOL; 2	NC	0
2010	Trackspeed	Porsche 997 GT3-R	Porsche 4.0 L Flat-6	SIL; 1; 23	SIL; 2; 19	BRN; 1	BRN; 2	JAR; 1	JAR; 2	LEC; 1	LEC; 2	ALG; 1	ALG; 2	ZOL; 1	ZOL; 2	NC	0

=== Complete GT World Challenge results ===
==== Complete Blancpain Sprint Series results ====
(key) (Races in bold indicate pole position; results in italics indicate fastest lap)

Year	Team	Car	Class	1	2	3	4	5	6	7	8	9	10	11	12	13	14	Pos.	Points
2013	Trackspeed	Porsche 997 GT3 R	Pro	NOG; QR	NOG; CR	ZOL; QR	ZOL; CR	ZAN; QR	ZAN; QR	SVK; QR	SVK; CR	NAV; QR	NAV; CR	BAK; QR; Ret	BAK; CR; DNS			NC	0
2014	Schütz Motorsport	Porsche 997 GT3 R	Pro	NOG; QR	NOG; CR	BRH; QR	BRH; CR	ZAN; QR	ZAN; CR	SVK; QR	SVK; CR	ALG; QR	ALG; CR	ZOL; QR	ZOL; CR	BAK; QR; 5	BAK; CR; 5	20th	12
2015	Fach Auto Tech	Porsche 997 GT3 R	Pro-Am	**NOG**; **QR**; 10	NOG; CR; 16	BRH; QR	BRH; CR	ZOL; QR	ZOL; CR	MSC; QR	MSC; CR	ALG; QR	ALG; CR	MIS; QR	MIS; CR	ZAN; QR	ZAN; CR	7th	22

==== GT World Challenge Europe Endurance Cup ====
(Races in bold indicate pole position) (Races in italics indicate fastest lap)

Year	Team	Car	Class	1	2	3	4	5	6	7	Pos.	Points
2013	Fach Auto Tech	Porsche 997 GT3 R	Pro-Am	MNZ	SIL	LEC	SPA; 6H ?	SPA; 12H ?	SPA; 24H; 21	NÜR	37th	2
2014	Fach Auto Tech	Porsche 997 GT3 R	Pro-Am	MNZ	SIL	LEC	SPA; 6H; 46	SPA; 12H; 41	SPA; 24H; 26	NÜR	NC	0

=== Complete ADAC GT Masters results ===
(key) (Races in bold indicate pole position) (Races in italics indicate fastest lap)

Year	Team	Car	1	2	3	4	5	6	7	8	9	10	11	12	13	14	15	16	DC	Points
2011	Mühlner Motorsport	Porsche 911 GT3 Cup S	OSC; 1	OSC; 2	SAC; 1	SAC; 2	ZOL; 1	ZOL; 2	NÜR; 1 Ret	NÜR; 2; 32	RBR; 1	RBR; 2	LAU; 1	LAU; 2	ASS; 1	ASS; 2	HOC; 1	HOC; 2	NC	0
2012	FACH AUTO TECH	Porsche 911 GT3 R	OSC; 1; 19	OSC; 2; 10	ZAN; 1; 11	ZAN; 2; 21	SAC; 1; 16	SAC; 2; 11	NÜR; 1; 11	NÜR; 2; 5	RBR; 1; 4	RBR; 2; 12	LAU; 1; 7	**LAU**; **2**; 27	NÜR; 1; 12	NÜR; 2; 9	HOC; 1; 6	**HOC**; **2**; 26	21st	39
2013	Tonino powered by Herberth Motorsport	Porsche 911 GT3 R	OSC; 1; 3	OSC; 2; 4	SPA; 1; 9	SPA; 2; 5	SAC; 1; 4	SAC; 2 DSQ	NÜR; 1	NÜR; 2	RBR; 1; 4	RBR; 2; 5	LAU; 1; 3	**LAU**; **2**; 1	SVK; 1; 6	SVK; 2; 7	HOC; 1; 3	HOC; 2; 4	4th	154
2014	GW IT Racing Team Schütz Motorsport	Porsche 911 GT3 R	OSC; 1	OSC; 2	ZAN; 1	ZAN; 2	LAU; 1; 6	LAU; 2; 3	RBR; 1	RBR; 2	SLO; 1	SLO; 2	NÜR; 1	NÜR; 2	SAC; 1	SAC; 2			19th	50
2014	Tonino Team Herberth	Porsche 911 GT3 R															HOC; 1; 3	HOC; 2; 4	19th	50
2015	GW IT Racing Team Schütz Motorsport	Porsche 911 GT3 R	OSC; 1	OSC; 2	RBR; 1	RBR; 2	SPA; 1; 4	SPA; 2; 8	**LAU**; **1**; 5	LAU; 2; 3	**NÜR**; **1** Ret	**NÜR**; **2**; 3	SAC; 1; 9	**SAC**; **2**; 3	**ZAN**; **1**; 11	ZAN; 2; 5	HOC; 1	HOC; 2	13th	85
2016	Precote Herberth Motorsport	Porsche 911 GT3 R	OSC; 1; 4	OSC; 2; 6	SAC; 1 Ret	SAC; 2; 15	**LAU**; **1**; 1	LAU; 2 Ret	RBR; 1 Ret	RBR; 2 Ret	**NÜR**; **1**; 2	NÜR; 2; 4	ZAN; 1; 3	ZAN; 2; 6	HOC; 1 Ret	**HOC**; **2**; 1			5th	123
2020	Space Drive Racing by KÜS Team75 Bernhard	Porsche 911 GT3 R (2017)	LAU1; 1; 16	LAU1; 2; 24	NÜR; 1	NÜR; 2	HOC; 1	HOC; 2	SAC; 1	SAC; 2	RBR; 1	RBR; 2	LAU2; 1	LAU2; 2	OSC; 1	OSC; 2			NC	0
2021	MRS GT-Racing	Porsche 911 GT3 R	OSC; 1	OSC; 2	RBR; 1	RBR; 2	ZAN; 1	ZAN; 2	LAU; 1	LAU; 2	SAC; 1	SAC; 2	HOC; 1; 24	HOC; 2; 20	NÜR; 1	NÜR; 2			43rd	0

=== Complete IMSA SportsCar Championship results ===
Year	Entrant	Class	Chassis	Engine	1	2	3	4	5	6	7	8	9	10	Rank	Points
2015	Magnus Racing	GTD	Porsche 911 GT America	Porsche 4.0 L Flat-6	DAY; 11	SEB	LAG	DET	WGL	LIM	ELK	VIR	COA	PET	49th	22
