= Toni Seiler =

Swiss racing driver (born 1958)

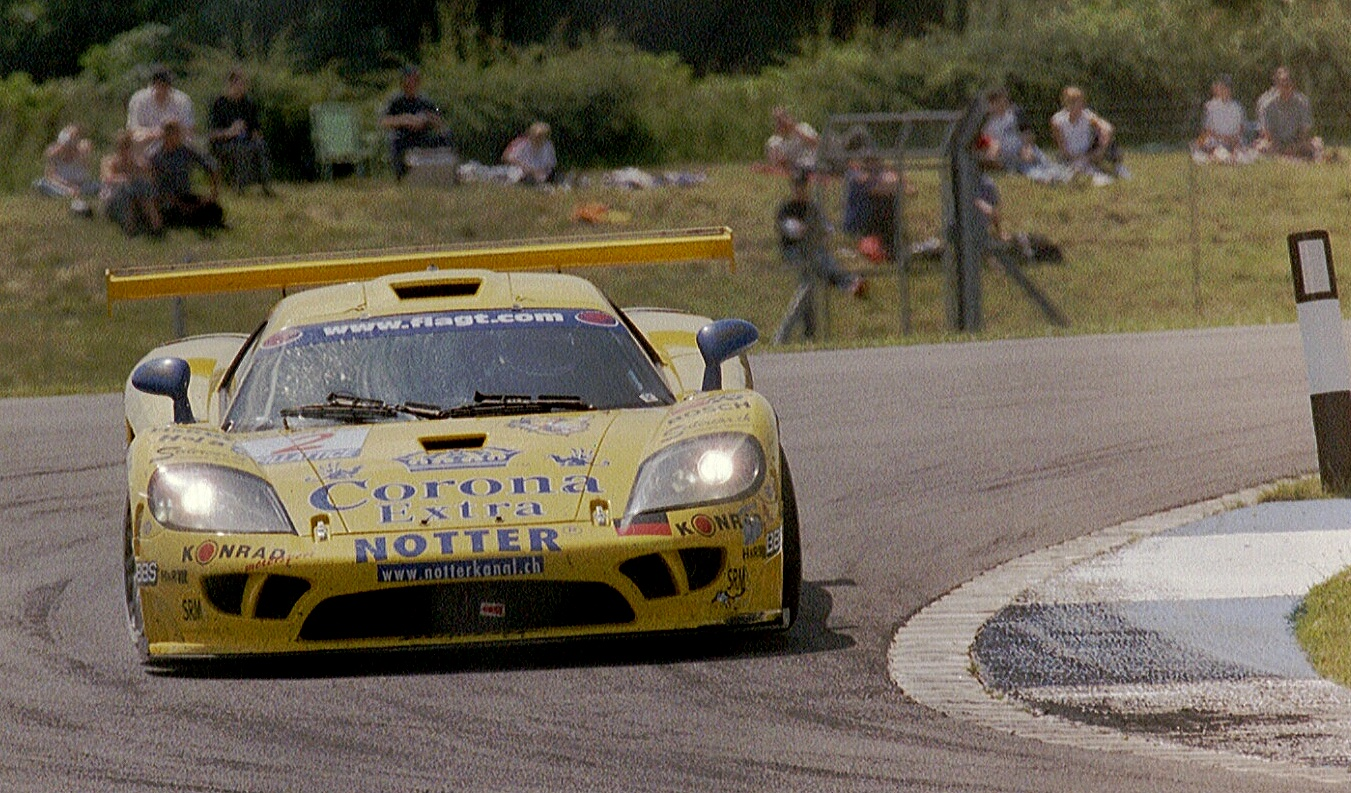
- Seiler in 2003
- Nationality: (Switzerland) Swiss
- Born: 18 March 1958 (age 68) Zurich, Switzerland

ADAC GT Masters career
- Categorisation: FIA Bronze
- Years active: 2007–2014
- Teams: Callaway Competition; Toni Seiler Racing
- Starts: 109
- Wins: 2
- Podiums: 12
- Poles: 4
- Fastest laps: 5
- Best finish: 4th in 2009

Championship titles
- 2009–2010 2005: ADAC GT Masters – Amateur; Le Mans Endurance Series – LMGT1
24 Hours of Le Mans career
- Years: 1996 – 2003, 2005
- Teams: Elf Haberthur Racing; Konrad Motorsport; Chamberlain Engineering; Team Goh; BMS Scuderia Italia
- Best finish: 14th (1999)
- Class wins: 0

Toni Seiler (born 18 March 1958) is a Swiss racing driver who currently competes in the GT3 Revival Series for his own team, Seiler Racing.

Seiler was the LMGT1 champion in the 2005 Le Mans Endurance Series season. He also won back-to-back ADAC GT Masters Amateur championships in 2009 and 2010.

== Racing record ==
=== Racing career summary ===
Season	Series	Team	Races	Wins	Poles	F/Laps	Podiums	Points	Position
1989	24 Hours of Nürburgring – Class 6	Kloft Motorsport	1	0	0	0	0	N/A	DNF
1992	Porsche Carrera Cup Germany		?	?	?	?	?	?	?
1993	Porsche Supercup		?	?	?	?	?	29	14th
1994	BPR Global GT Series	Mühlbauer Motorsport	1	0	0	0	0	0	NC
1995	BPR Global GT Series	Konrad Motorsport	5	0	0	0	0	73	22nd
1996	BPR Global GT Series	Konrad Motorsport	7	0	0	0	0	32	51st
1996	24 Hours of Le Mans – GT2	Elf Haberthur Racing	1	0	0	0	0	N/A	DNF
1997	FIA GT Championship – GT2	Konrad Motorsport	10	0	0	0	1	12	13th
1997	24 Hours of Le Mans – GT2	Konrad Motorsport	1	0	0	0	0	N/A	DNF
1998	United States Road Racing Championship – GT2	Konrad Motorsport	1	1	0	0	1	?	7th
1998	FIA GT Championship – GT2	Konrad Motorsport	5	0	0	0	0	5	24th
1998	24 Hours of Le Mans – GT2	Konrad Motorsport	1	0	0	0	0	N/A	DNF
1999	United States Road Racing Championship – GT2	Proton Competition	1	0	0	0	0	?	35th
1999	FIA GT Championship	Chamberlain Engineering	6	0	0	0	2	14	11th
1999	24 Hours of Le Mans – GTS	Chamberlain Engineering	1	0	0	0	1	N/A	**3rd**
2000	Grand American Road Racing Championship – GTO	Team Viper West	1	0	0	0	0	?	32nd
2000	FIA GT Championship – GT	Chamberlain Motorsport	5	0	0	0	0	4	20th
2000	American Le Mans Series – GTS	Chamberlain Motorsport	1	0	0	0	0	14	42nd
2000	24 Hours of Le Mans – GTS	Team Goh	1	0	0	0	0	N/A	DNF
2001	Grand American Road Racing Championship – SRPII	Pilbeam Racing America	1	0	0	0	0	0	NC
2001	FIA GT Championship – N-GT	Freisinger Racing	1	0	0	0	0	6	24th
2001	American Le Mans Series – GTS	Konrad Team Saleen	1	1	0	0	1	19	25th
2001	American Le Mans Series – GTS	Konrad Motorsport	1	0	0	0	0	19	25th
2001	24 Hours of Le Mans – GTS	Konrad Motorsport	1	0	0	0	0	N/A	DNF
2002	Rolex Sports Car Series – GTS	Konrad Motorsport	1	0	0	0	1	0	NC
2002	American Le Mans Series – GTS	Konrad Motorsport	3	0	1	0	1	58	16th
2002	24 Hours of Le Mans – GTS	Konrad Motorsport	1	0	0	0	0	N/A	7th
2003	Rolex Sports Car Series – GTS	Konrad Motorsport	1	0	0	0	0	0	NC
2003	American Le Mans Series – GTS	Konrad Motorsport	1	0	0	0	0	0	NC
2003	24 Hours of Le Mans – GTS	Konrad Motorsport	1	0	0	0	0	N/A	DNF
2003	FIA GT Championship – GT	Konrad Motorsport	10	0	0	3	1	17	11th
2003	1000 km of Le Mans – GTS	Konrad Motorsport	1	0	0	0	0	N/A	4th
2004	FIA GT Championship – GT	Konrad Motorsport	10	0	0	0	0	7	28th
2005	Rolex Sports Car Series – GT	Xtreme Racing Group	1	0	0	0	0	2	194th
2005	Grand-Am Cup – ST		1	0	0	0	0	22	79th
2005	Le Mans Endurance Series – LMGT1	BMS Scuderia Italia	5	0	0	0	4	35	**1st**
2005	24 Hours of Le Mans – LMGT1	BMS Scuderia Italia	1	0	0	0	0	N/A	DNF
2006	Rolex Sports Car Series – GT	WTF Engineering	1	0	0	0	0	4	170th
2006	FIA GT3 European Championship	BMS Scuderia Italia	9	0	0	0	3	26	5th
2007	FIA GT3 European Championship	BMS Scuderia Italia	5	0	0	0	0	6	15th
2007	ADAC GT Masters	Martini Callaway Racing	4	1	0	0	4	46	6th
2008	ADAC GT Masters	Toni Seiler Racing	14	0	0	1	0	21	13th
2009	ADAC GT Masters	Callaway Competition	14	1	0	2	5	58	4th
2010	ADAC GT Masters	Callaway Competition	13	0	1	1	3	26	14th
2010	FIA GT3 European Championship	Toni Seiler Racing	8	0	1	0	2	51	11th
2011	ADAC GT Masters	Callaway Competition	16	0	0	1	0	6	39th
2012	ADAC GT Masters	Callaway Competition	16	0	0	0	0	19	28th
2013	ADAC GT Masters	Callaway Competition	16	0	2	0	0	18	25th
2014	ADAC GT Masters	Callaway Competition	16	0	0	0	0	1	44th
2026	GT3 Revival Series – Am Gen 1	Seiler Racing	4	0	0	0	1	43*	5th*

* Season still in progress

=== Complete 24 Hours of Le Mans results ===
Year	Team	Co-Drivers	Car	Class	Laps	Pos.	Class Pos.
1996	(Switzerland) Elf Haberthur Racing	(France) Bruno Ilien (Belgium) Michel Neugarten	Porsche 911 GT2	GT2	46	DNF	DNF
1997	(Germany) Konrad Motorsport	(France) Michel Ligonnet (United States) Larry Schumacher	Porsche 911 GT2	GT2	126	DNF	DNF
1998	(Germany) Konrad Motorsport	(United States) Peter Kitchak (Italy) Angelo Zadra	Porsche 911 GT2	GT2	2	DNF	DNF
1999	(United Kingdom) Chamberlain Engineering	(Portugal) Ni Amorim (Netherlands) Hans Hugenholtz Jr.	Chrysler Viper GTS-R	GTS	315	14th	**3rd**
2000	(Japan) Team Goh	(Switzerland) Walter Brun (Germany) Christian Gläsel	Chrysler Viper GTS-R	GTS	210	DNF	DNF
2001	(Germany) Konrad Motorsport	(Switzerland) Walter Brun (United States) Charles Slater	Saleen S7-R	GTS	4	DNF	DNF
2002	(Germany) Konrad Motorsport	(United States) Terry Borcheller (Austria) Franz Konrad	Saleen S7-R	GTS	266	26th	7th
2003	(Germany) Konrad Motorsport	(Switzerland) Walter Brun (Austria) Franz Konrad	Saleen S7-R	GTS	91	DNF	DNF
2005	(Italy) BMS Scuderia Italia	(Italy) Michele Bartyan (Italy) Matteo Malucelli	Ferrari 550-GTS Maranello	GT1	60	DNF	DNF

=== Complete FIA GT Championship results ===
(key) (Races in bold indicate pole position) (Races in italics indicate fastest lap)

Year	Team	Car	Class	1	2	3	4	5	6	7	8	9	10	11	Pos.	Pts
1997	Konrad Motorsport	Porsche 911 GT2	GT2	HOC; 5	SIL; 9	HEL; Ret	NÜR; 3	SPA; 7	A1R; Ret	SUZ	DON; 5	MUG; 4	SEB; 6	LAG; Ret	13th	12
1998	Konrad Motorsport	Porsche 911 GT2	GT2	OSC; 4	SIL; 9	HOC; 7	DIJ; 15	HUN; Ret	SUZ	DON; 5	A1R; 7	HOM; 7	LAG; 10		24th	5
1999	Chamberlain Engineering	Chrysler Viper GTS-R	GT	MNZ	SIL; Ret	HOC; Ret	HUN; 4	ZOL; 2	OSC; 3	DON; 6	HOM	GLN	ZHU		11th	14
2000	Chamberlain Motorsport	Chrysler Viper GTS-R	GT	VAL; 6	EST; 10	MNZ; 4	SIL; 7	HUN	ZOL	A1R	LAU; DSQ	BRN	MAG		20th	4
2001	Freisinger Motorsport	Porsche 911 GT3-RS	N-GT	MNZ	BRN	MAG	SIL	ZOL	HUN	SPA; 4	A1R	NÜR	JAR	EST	24th	6
2003	Konrad Motorsport	Saleen S7-R	GT	CAT; 8	MAG; Ret	PER; Ret	BRN; 9	DON; 6	SPA; Ret	AND; 2	OSC; DSQ	EST; 4	MNZ; 11		11th	17
2004	Konrad Motorsport	Saleen S7-R	GT	MNZ; Ret	VAL; 11	MAG; 5	HOC; Ret	BRN; 6	DON; 14	SPA; Ret	IMO; Ret	OSC; 13	DUB; 12	ZHU	28th	7

=== Complete American Le Mans Series results ===
(key) (Races in bold indicate pole position; results in italics indicate fastest lap)

Year	Entrant	Class	Chassis	Engine	1	2	3	4	5	6	7	8	9	10	11	12	Pos.	Pts	Ref
2000	Chamberlain Motorsport	GTS	Chrysler Viper GTS-R	Chrysler EWB 8.0 L V10	SEB	CHA	SIL; 6	NÜR	SON	MOS	TEX	ROS	PET	MON	LSV	ADE			
2001	Konrad Team Saleen	GTS	Saleen S7-R	Ford Windsor 7.0 L V8	TEX	SEB	DON	JAR; 1	SON	POR	MOS	MID	MON				25th	19	
2001	Konrad Motorsport	GTS	Saleen S7-R	Ford Windsor 7.0 L V8										PET; 6			25th	19	
2002	Konrad Motorsport	GTS	Saleen S7-R	Ford Windsor 7.0 L V8	SEB; 2	SON	MDO	ELK	WAS	TRO	MOS	MON	**MIA**; 8	PET; 6			16th	58	
2003	Konrad Motorsport	GTS	Saleen S7-R	Ford Windsor 7.0 L V8	SEB; Ret	ATL	SON	TRO	MOS	ELK	MON	MIA	PET				NC	0	

=== Complete Le Mans Endurance Series results ===
(key) (Races in bold indicate pole position) (Races in italics indicate fastest lap)

Year	Team	Class	Car	Engine	1	2	3	4	5	Pos.	Pts
2005	BMS Scuderia Italia	GT1	Ferrari 550-GTS Maranello	Ferrari F133 A 6.0 L V12	SPA; 3	MNZ; 1	SIL; 6	NÜR; 3	IST; 1	1st	35
