= 2013 ADAC GT Masters =

Sports car racing contest

The 2013 ADAC GT Masters season was the seventh season of the ADAC GT Masters, the grand tourer-style sports car racing founded by the German automobile club ADAC. It began on 27 April at Motorsport Arena Oschersleben and finished on 29 September at Hockenheim after eight double-header meetings. Diego Alessi and Daniel Keilwitz claimed the championship title.

== Entry list ==
Team	Car	No.	Drivers	Events
(Germany) MS Racing	Audi R8 LMS ultra	1	(Germany) Sebastian Asch	All
(Germany) MS Racing	Audi R8 LMS ultra	1	(Germany) Florian Stoll	All
(Germany) MS Racing	Audi R8 LMS ultra	100	(Germany) Daniel Dobitsch	All
(Germany) MS Racing	Audi R8 LMS ultra	100	(India) Aditya Patel	All
(Germany) Callaway Competition	Corvette Z06.R GT3	2	(Italy) Diego Alessi	All
(Germany) Callaway Competition	Corvette Z06.R GT3	2	(Germany) Daniel Keilwitz	All
(Germany) Callaway Competition	Corvette Z06.R GT3	3	(Germany) Christian Hohenadel	All
(Germany) Callaway Competition	Corvette Z06.R GT3	3	(Germany) Andreas Wirth	All
(Germany) Callaway Competition	Corvette Z06.R GT3	17	(Switzerland) Remo Lips	All
(Germany) Callaway Competition	Corvette Z06.R GT3	17	(Germany) Lennart Marioneck	All
(Germany) Callaway Competition	Corvette Z06.R GT3	18	(Switzerland) Toni Seiler	All
(Germany) Callaway Competition	Corvette Z06.R GT3	18	(Germany) Niclas Kentenich	1–2
(Germany) Callaway Competition	Corvette Z06.R GT3	18	(Austria) Gerhard Tweraser	3
(Germany) Callaway Competition	Corvette Z06.R GT3	18	(Netherlands) Jeroen Bleekemolen	4, 8
(Germany) Callaway Competition	Corvette Z06.R GT3	18	(France) Mike Parisy	5–7
(Germany) / Team Geyer & Weinig EDV-Unternehmensberatung; (Germany) / Schütz Motorsport	Porsche 911 GT3 R	4	(France) Nicolas Armindo	1–6, 8
(Germany) / Team Geyer & Weinig EDV-Unternehmensberatung; (Germany) / Schütz Motorsport	Porsche 911 GT3 R	4	(Germany) Christian Engelhart	1–6
(Germany) / Team Geyer & Weinig EDV-Unternehmensberatung; (Germany) / Schütz Motorsport	Porsche 911 GT3 R	4	(Denmark) Michael Christensen	8
(Germany) Farnbacher Racing	Porsche 911 GT3 R	5	(Denmark) Christina Nielsen	All
(Germany) Farnbacher Racing	Porsche 911 GT3 R	5	(Denmark) Allan Simonsen	1–2
(Germany) Farnbacher Racing	Porsche 911 GT3 R	5	(Germany) Marco Seefried	3
(Germany) Farnbacher Racing	Porsche 911 GT3 R	5	(United Kingdom) Sean Edwards	4
(Germany) Farnbacher Racing	Porsche 911 GT3 R	5	(France) Anthony Beltoise	5
(Germany) Farnbacher Racing	Porsche 911 GT3 R	5	(United Kingdom) Nick Tandy	6
(Germany) Farnbacher Racing	Porsche 911 GT3 R	5	(Poland) Kuba Giermaziak	7, 8
(Germany) Farnbacher Racing	Porsche 911 GT3 R	6	(Germany) Mario Farnbacher	All
(Germany) Farnbacher Racing	Porsche 911 GT3 R	6	(Switzerland) Philipp Frommenwiler	All
(Germany) Farnbacher Racing	Porsche 911 GT3 R	7	(Switzerland) Jürg Aeberhard	All
(Germany) Farnbacher Racing	Porsche 911 GT3 R	7	(Czech Republic) Tomas Pivoda	1–4
(Germany) Farnbacher Racing	Porsche 911 GT3 R	7	(Germany) David Jahn	5–8
(Germany) Tonino powered by Herberth Motorsport	Porsche 911 GT3 R	8	(Germany) Robert Renauer	All
(Germany) Tonino powered by Herberth Motorsport	Porsche 911 GT3 R	8	(Austria) Martin Ragginger	1–3, 5–8
(Germany) Tonino powered by Herberth Motorsport	Porsche 911 GT3 R	8	(Denmark) Michael Christensen	4
(Germany) Tonino powered by Herberth Motorsport	Porsche 911 GT3 R	9	(Germany) René Bourdeaux	All
(Germany) Tonino powered by Herberth Motorsport	Porsche 911 GT3 R	9	(Germany) Alfred Renauer	All
(Germany) Polarweiss Racing	Mercedes-Benz SLS AMG GT3	10	(Germany) Maximilian Buhk	All
(Germany) Polarweiss Racing	Mercedes-Benz SLS AMG GT3	10	(Germany) Maximilian Götz	All
(Germany) Polarweiss Racing	Mercedes-Benz SLS AMG GT3	11	(Russia) Sergey Afanasyev	1–7
(Germany) Polarweiss Racing	Mercedes-Benz SLS AMG GT3	11	(Sweden) Andreas Simonsen	1–7
(Germany) Polarweiss Racing	Mercedes-Benz SLS AMG GT3	11	(Germany) Luca Ludwig	8
(Germany) Polarweiss Racing	Mercedes-Benz SLS AMG GT3	11	(Germany) Thomas Jäger	8
(Netherlands) DB Motorsport	BMW Z4 GT3	12	(Netherlands) Simon Knap	All
(Netherlands) DB Motorsport	BMW Z4 GT3	12	(Netherlands) Jeroen den Boer	All
(Germany) Lambda Performance	Ford GT GT3	14	(Germany) Frank Kechele	All
(Germany) Lambda Performance	Ford GT GT3	14	(Belgium) Nico Verdonck	1–2
(Germany) Lambda Performance	Ford GT GT3	14	(Germany) Dominik Schwager	3–8
(Germany) THE BOSS YACO RACING	Audi R8 LMS ultra	16	(Germany) Philip Geipel	All
(Germany) THE BOSS YACO RACING	Audi R8 LMS ultra	16	(France) Dino Lunardi	1–2
(Germany) THE BOSS YACO RACING	Audi R8 LMS ultra	16	(Germany) Christian Mamerow	3
(Germany) THE BOSS YACO RACING	Audi R8 LMS ultra	16	(Germany) Frank Schmickler	4, 6, 8
(Germany) THE BOSS YACO RACING	Audi R8 LMS ultra	16	(Slovakia) Filip Sladecka	5, 7
(Germany) PIXUM Team Schubert	BMW Z4 GT3	19	(Germany) Claudia Hürtgen	All
(Germany) PIXUM Team Schubert	BMW Z4 GT3	19	(Austria) Dominik Baumann	All
(Germany) PIXUM Team Schubert	BMW Z4 GT3	20	(Germany) Max Sandritter	All
(Germany) PIXUM Team Schubert	BMW Z4 GT3	20	(Germany) Jörg Müller	1–2, 4–8
(Germany) PIXUM Team Schubert	BMW Z4 GT3	20	(Germany) Jens Klingmann	3
(Germany) Team rhino's Leipert Motorsport	Lamborghini Gallardo FL2	21	(Germany) Frank Schmickler	1–2
(Germany) Team rhino's Leipert Motorsport	Lamborghini Gallardo FL2	21	(Germany) David Mengesdorf	1
(Germany) Team rhino's Leipert Motorsport	Lamborghini Gallardo FL2	21	(Netherlands) Peter Kox	2, 3
(Germany) Team rhino's Leipert Motorsport	Lamborghini Gallardo FL2	21	(Germany) Fabian Hamprecht	3
(Germany) Team rhino's Leipert Motorsport	Lamborghini Gallardo FL2	21	(Germany) Carsten Seifert	6
(Germany) Team rhino's Leipert Motorsport	Lamborghini Gallardo FL2	21	(Germany) Roland Rehfeld	6
(Germany) Team rhino's Leipert Motorsport	Lamborghini Gallardo FL2	22	(Czech Republic) Eduard Leganov	1–3
(Germany) Team rhino's Leipert Motorsport	Lamborghini Gallardo FL2	22	(Germany) Fabian Hamprecht	1–2
(Germany) Team rhino's Leipert Motorsport	Lamborghini Gallardo FL2	22	(Germany) Marcel Leipert	3
(Germany) Fischer Racing	Aston Martin V12 Vantage GT3	23	(Switzerland) Gabriele Gardel	1
(Germany) Fischer Racing	Aston Martin V12 Vantage GT3	23	(Switzerland) Lorenz Frey	1
(United Kingdom) JRM Racing	Nissan GT-R GT3	24	(United Kingdom) Matt Bell	8
(United Kingdom) JRM Racing	Nissan GT-R GT3	24	(United Kingdom) Peter Dumbreck	8
(United Kingdom) JRM Racing	Nissan GT-R GT3	25	(United Kingdom) Jody Fannin	8
(United Kingdom) JRM Racing	Nissan GT-R GT3	25	(United Kingdom) Steven Kane	8
(Germany) Prosperia C. Abt Racing	Audi R8 LMS ultra	26	(Switzerland) Rahel Frey	All
(Germany) Prosperia C. Abt Racing	Audi R8 LMS ultra	26	(Germany) Markus Winkelhock	1–2
(Germany) Prosperia C. Abt Racing	Audi R8 LMS ultra	26	(Germany) Christopher Haase	3–8
(Germany) Prosperia C. Abt Racing	Audi R8 LMS ultra	27	(Germany) Christopher Mies	All
(Germany) Prosperia C. Abt Racing	Audi R8 LMS ultra	27	(Germany) René Rast	All
(Germany) Prosperia C. Abt Racing	Audi R8 LMS ultra	28	(Germany) Christer Jöns	All
(Germany) Prosperia C. Abt Racing	Audi R8 LMS ultra	28	(Germany) Christian Mamerow	1–2
(Germany) Prosperia C. Abt Racing	Audi R8 LMS ultra	28	(Germany) Markus Winkelhock	3–8
(Germany) RWT RacingTeam	Corvette Z06.R GT3	40	(Germany) Sven Barth	3, 4, 8
(Germany) RWT RacingTeam	Corvette Z06.R GT3	40	(Germany) Gerd Beisel	3, 4, 8
(Germany) SaReNi-United	Chevrolet Camaro GT	41	(Germany) Albert von Thurn und Taxis	5, 7, 8
(Germany) SaReNi-United	Chevrolet Camaro GT	41	(Netherlands) Peter Kox	5
(Germany) SaReNi-United	Chevrolet Camaro GT	41	(Slovakia) Štefan Rosina	7
(Germany) SaReNi-United	Chevrolet Camaro GT	41	(United Kingdom) Oliver Gavin	8
(Austria) GRT Grasser Racing Team	Lamborghini Gallardo FL2	43	(Austria) Bernhard Auinger	5
(Austria) GRT Grasser Racing Team	Lamborghini Gallardo FL2	43	(Austria) Gottfried Grasser	5
(Austria) GRT Grasser Racing Team	Lamborghini Gallardo FL2	44	(Austria) Harald Proczyk	5
(Austria) GRT Grasser Racing Team	Lamborghini Gallardo FL2	44	(Austria) Gerhard Tweraser	5
(Germany) Schulze Motorsport	Nissan GT-R GT3	45	(Germany) Michael Schulze	3
(Germany) Schulze Motorsport	Nissan GT-R GT3	45	(Germany) Tobias Schulze	3
(Germany) Vita4One Racing Team	BMW Z4 GT3	46	(Czech Republic) Martin Matzke	2–4
(Germany) Vita4One Racing Team	BMW Z4 GT3	46	(Netherlands) Yelmer Buurman	2, 3
(Germany) Vita4One Racing Team	BMW Z4 GT3	46	(United Kingdom) Daniel Brown	4
(Germany) Vita4One Racing Team	BMW Z4 GT3	47	(Germany) Paul Green	2–5
(Germany) Vita4One Racing Team	BMW Z4 GT3	47	(Germany) Jonas Giesler	2
(Germany) Vita4One Racing Team	BMW Z4 GT3	47	(Germany) Niclas Kentenich	3–5
(Belgium) Prospeed Competition	Porsche 911 GT3 R	48	(United States) Charles Espenlaub	2
(Belgium) Prospeed Competition	Porsche 911 GT3 R	48	(United States) Charles Putman	2
(Germany) Phoenix Racing	Audi R8 LMS ultra	49	(Belgium) Enzo Ide	8
(Germany) Phoenix Racing	Audi R8 LMS ultra	49	(Belgium) Nico Verdonck	8

== Race calendar and results ==
Round		Circuit	Date	Pole	Winner
1	R1	(Germany) Motorsport Arena Oschersleben	27 April	No. 10 Polarweiss Racing	No. 27 Prosperia C. Abt Racing
1	R1	(Germany) Motorsport Arena Oschersleben	27 April	(Germany) Maximilian Buhk (Germany) Maximilian Götz	(Germany) Christopher Mies (Germany) René Rast
1	R2	(Germany) Motorsport Arena Oschersleben	28 April	No. 10 Polarweiss Racing	No. 2 Callaway Competition
1	R2	(Germany) Motorsport Arena Oschersleben	28 April	(Germany) Maximilian Buhk (Germany) Maximilian Götz	(Italy) Diego Alessi (Germany) Daniel Keilwitz
2	R1	(Belgium) Circuit de Spa-Francorchamps	11 May	No. 14 Lambda Performance	No. 14 Lambda Performance
2	R1	(Belgium) Circuit de Spa-Francorchamps	11 May	(Germany) Frank Kechele (Belgium) Nico Verdonck	(Germany) Frank Kechele (Belgium) Nico Verdonck
2	R2	(Belgium) Circuit de Spa-Francorchamps	12 May	No. 14 Lambda Performance	No. 19 PIXUM Team Schubert
2	R2	(Belgium) Circuit de Spa-Francorchamps	12 May	(Germany) Frank Kechele (Belgium) Nico Verdonck	(Austria) Dominik Baumann (Germany) Claudia Hürtgen
3	R1	(Germany) Sachsenring	8 June	No. 27 Prosperia C. Abt Racing	No. 27 Prosperia C. Abt Racing
3	R1	(Germany) Sachsenring	8 June	(Germany) Christopher Mies (Germany) René Rast	(Germany) Christopher Mies (Germany) René Rast
3	R2	(Germany) Sachsenring	9 June	No. 20 PIXUM Team Schubert	No. 20 PIXUM Team Schubert
3	R2	(Germany) Sachsenring	9 June	(Germany) Jens Klingmann (Germany) Max Sandritter	(Germany) Jens Klingmann (Germany) Max Sandritter
4	R1	(Germany) Nürburgring	3 August	No. 2 Callaway Competition	No. 10 Polarweiss Racing
4	R1	(Germany) Nürburgring	3 August	(Italy) Diego Alessi (Germany) Daniel Keilwitz	(Germany) Maximilian Buhk (Germany) Maximilian Götz
4	R2	(Germany) Nürburgring	4 August	No. 18 Callaway Competition	No. 19 PIXUM Team Schubert
4	R2	(Germany) Nürburgring	4 August	(Netherlands) Jeroen Bleekemolen (Switzerland) Toni Seiler	(Austria) Dominik Baumann (Germany) Claudia Hürtgen
5	R1	(Austria) Red Bull Ring	10 August	No. 2 Callaway Competition	No. 2 Callaway Competition
5	R1	(Austria) Red Bull Ring	10 August	(Italy) Diego Alessi (Germany) Daniel Keilwitz	(Italy) Diego Alessi (Germany) Daniel Keilwitz
5	R2	(Austria) Red Bull Ring	11 August	No. 14 Lambda Performance	No. 2 Callaway Competition
5	R2	(Austria) Red Bull Ring	11 August	(Germany) Frank Kechele (Belgium) Nico Verdonck	(Italy) Diego Alessi (Germany) Daniel Keilwitz
6	R1	(Germany) Lausitzring	31 August	No. 6 Farnbacher Racing	No. 2 Callaway Competition
6	R1	(Germany) Lausitzring	31 August	(Germany) Mario Farnbacher (Switzerland) Philipp Frommenwiler	(Italy) Diego Alessi (Germany) Daniel Keilwitz
6	R2	(Germany) Lausitzring	1 September	No. 8 Tonino powered by Herberth Motorsport	No. 8 Tonino powered by Herberth Motorsport
6	R2	(Germany) Lausitzring	1 September	(Austria) Martin Ragginger (Germany) Robert Renauer	(Austria) Martin Ragginger (Germany) Robert Renauer
7	R1	Automotodróm Slovakia Ring	14 September	No. 14 Lambda Performance	No. 12 DB Motorsport
7	R1	Automotodróm Slovakia Ring	14 September	(Germany) Frank Kechele (Germany) Dominik Schwager	(Netherlands) Jeroen den Boer (Netherlands) Simon Knap
7	R2	Automotodróm Slovakia Ring	15 September	No. 28 Prosperia C. Abt Racing	No. 2 Callaway Competition
7	R2	Automotodróm Slovakia Ring	15 September	(Germany) Christer Jöns (Germany) Markus Winkelhock	(Italy) Diego Alessi (Germany) Daniel Keilwitz
8	R1	(Germany) Hockenheimring	28 September	No. 14 Lambda Performance	No. 14 Lambda Performance
8	R1	(Germany) Hockenheimring	28 September	(Germany) Frank Kechele (Germany) Dominik Schwager	(Germany) Frank Kechele (Germany) Dominik Schwager
8	R2	(Germany) Hockenheimring	29 September	No. 18 Callaway Competition	No. 14 Lambda Performance
8	R2	(Germany) Hockenheimring	29 September	(Netherlands) Jeroen Bleekemolen (Switzerland) Toni Seiler	(Germany) Frank Kechele (Germany) Dominik Schwager
