= Dominik Schwager =

German auto racing driver

- Nationality: (Germany) German
- Born: 18 August 1976 (age 50) Munich, Germany

FIA GT1 World Championship career
- Debut season: 2010
- Current team: All-Inkl.com Münnich Motorsport
- Categorisation: FIA Platinum (until 2013); FIA Gold (2014–2019); FIA Silver (2020–)
- Car number: 37
- Starts: 20
- Wins: 1
- Poles: 2
- Best finish: 1st in 2011

Previous series
- 2011 2007-09 2008 1999-08 2006 1999, 2002-03 1998 1996-97 1994-95: American Le Mans Series; VLN; ADAC GT Masters; Super GT; Porsche Carrera Cup; Formula Nippon; International Formula 3000; German Formula Three Championship; BMW/ADAC Formula Junior

Championship titles
- 1995: BMW/ADAC Formula Junior

Dominik Schwager (born 18 August 1976 in Munich) is a German auto racing driver.

== Career ==
Schwager's racing career began with karting in Germany, participating in the national championship from 1989 to 1992 before moving to the Junior Karting World Championship in 1993. Schwager went on to win a driver search held by BMW and the ADAC in 1993, earning him an entry in the Formula Junior open wheel series which he went on to win in 1995. Schwager progressed to the German Formula Three Championship, initially finishing second in the B-Cup category before taking on the top tier championship in 1997. Schwager was also selected to be part of the Benetton Formula junior team as part of a development program, aided by backing from BMW. This support landed him in the International Formula 3000 series in 1998 with French squad Oreca, but only earned points in one round of the series.

For 1999, Schwager made a change to his racing career and moved from Europe to Japan, entering the Formula Nippon series as well as having his first taste of grand tourer racing by entering the All Japan Grand Touring Car Championship (JGTC) series in select rounds partnered with Hideshi Matsuda driving a Team Taisan Porsche. Although Schwager scored only one point in the Formula Nippon season, he did earn two class wins in JGTC. This early success in JGTC led Schwager to concentrate solely on the series, moving to the top GT500 category and partnering Daisuke Ito at Nakajima Racing in the Mobil 1 Honda NSX. Schwager and Ito won two races and finished fourth in the points standings, while a further win was earned in the 2001 season. Schwager remained with Honda into 2002 but turned to the Mugen Motorsports team before switching to the Toyota Supra in 2003 with SARD. Schwager also made a return to Formula Nippon in 2003 with Kondo Racing but failed to score any points. Schwager returned to his Taisan team in 2004, earning another win in the now renamed Super GT series in 2005. Left without a contract for 2006, Schwager returned to Europe to drive in the Porsche Carrera Cup before returning to Super GT once again in the Team Kunimitsu NSX.

During the 2007 season, Schwager also participated in European races, driving in the Veranstaltergemeinschaft Langstreckenpokal Nürburgring (VLN) series as well as making his first start at the 24 Hours Nürburgring. This expanded in 2008 when Schwager entered the new ADAC GT Masters series in a Callaway Corvette and won three races. Schwager became a development driver for Alpina's GT3 program in 2009 while continuing in the VLN series before signing to drive with Münnich Motorsport in the inaugural FIA GT1 World Championship, driving Lamborghini.

== Racing record ==
Despite earning points in only four races in the season, Schwager and teammate Nicky Pastorelli were retained by Münnich for 2011 where the duo earned two pole positions and one Championship Race win en route to finishing the season eighth in the standings. Schwager and Pastorelli also participated in select rounds of the American Le Mans Series for West Racing.

=== Complete German Formula Three results ===
(key) (Races in bold indicate pole position) (Races in italics indicate fastest lap)

| Year | Entrant | Engine | Class | 1 | 2 | 3 | 4 | 5 | 6 | 7 | 8 | 9 | 10 | 11 | 12 | 13 | 14 | 15 | 16 | 17 | 18 | DC | Pts |
|---|---|---|---|---|---|---|---|---|---|---|---|---|---|---|---|---|---|---|---|---|---|---|---|
| 1996 | TKF Racing | Opel | B | HOC; 1; 4 | HOC; 2; 2 | NÜR; 14 | NÜR; 1; 14 | NÜR; 2; 20† | NOR; 1; 8 | NOR; 2; 6 | DIE; 1; 8 | DIE; 2; 4 | NÜR; 1 | NÜR; 2 | MAG; 1 | MAG; 2 | HOC; 1 | HOC; 2 | | | | 2nd | 66 |
| 1997 | Benetton RTL Junior Team | Opel | A | HOC; 1 Ret | HOC; 2; 5 | NÜR; 1 Ret | NÜR; 2; 9 | SAC; 1; 7 | SAC; 2; 4 | NOR; 1; 1 | **NOR**; **2**; 1 | WUN; 1 Ret | WUN; 2; 9 | ZWE; 1 | ZWE; 2 | SAL; 1; 9 | SAL; 2 Ret | LAH; 1; 17† | LAH; 2 Ret | NÜR; 1 Ret | NÜR; 2; 14 | 10th | 68 |

=== Complete International Formula 3000 results ===
(key) (Races in bold indicate pole position) (Races in italics indicate fastest lap)

| Year | Entrant | 1 | 2 | 3 | 4 | 5 | 6 | 7 | 8 | 9 | 10 | 11 | 12 | DC | Points |
|---|---|---|---|---|---|---|---|---|---|---|---|---|---|---|---|
| 1998 | RTL Team Oreca | OSC; 14 | IMO; 11 | CAT; 4 | SIL; 14 | MON; 10 | PAU; DNQ | A1R; Ret | HOC; 14 | HUN; 18 | SPA; Ret | PER; Ret | NÜR; 7 | 14th | 3 |

=== Complete JGTC/Super GT Results ===
(key) (Races in bold indicate pole position) (Races in italics indicate fastest lap)

| Year | Team | Car | Class | 1 | 2 | 3 | 4 | 5 | 6 | 7 | 8 | 9 | DC | Pts |
|---|---|---|---|---|---|---|---|---|---|---|---|---|---|---|
| 1999 | Team Taisan | Chrysler Viper GTS-R | GT500 | SUZ | FUJ | SUG; 15 | | | | | | | NC | 0 |
| 1999 | Team Taisan Jr. with Advan | Porsche 911 GT3R | GT300 | | | | MIN; Ret | FUJ; 1 | TAI; Ret | MOT; 1 | | | 8th | 40 |
| 2000 | Mobil1 Nakajima Racing | Honda NSX | GT500 | MOT; 3 | FUJ; 7 | SUG; 1 | FUJ; 9 | TAI; 16 | MIN; Ret | SUZ; 1 | | | 4th | 58 |
| 2001 | Mobil1 Nakajima Racing | Honda NSX | GT500 | TAI; 3 | FUJ; 12 | SUG; 14 | FUJ; 6 | **MOT**; 1 | SUZ; Ret | MIN; Ret | | | 8th | 38 |
| 2002 | Dome Project | Honda NSX | GT500 | TAI; 5 | FUJ; 3 | SUG; 3 | SEP; 10 | FUJ | MOT | MIN | SUZ | | 13th | 35 |
| 2003 | TOYOTA TEAM SARD | Toyota Supra | GT500 | TAI; 14 | FUJ; 3 | SUG; 14 | FUJ; 3 | FUJ; 7 | MOT; 7 | AUT; 1 | SUZ; 9 | | 6th | 57 |
| 2004 | Team Advan Tsuchiya | Toyota Supra | GT500 | TAI; 14 | SUG; 2 | SEP; Ret | TOK; 13 | MOT; 12 | AUT; 3 | SUZ; 10 | | | 12th | 31 |
| 2005 | Team Tsuchiya | Toyota Supra | GT500 | OKA; 1 | FUJ; 14 | SEP; 15 | SUG; 9 | MOT; 15 | FUJ | AUT; Ret | SUZ; 14 | | 15th | 25 |
| 2007 | Team Kunimitsu | Honda NSX | GT500 | SUZ; Ret | OKA; 2 | FUJ; 5 | SEP; 2 | SUG; 12 | SUZ; 4 | MOT; Ret | AUT; 2 | FUJ; 7 | **3rd** | **64** |
| 2008 | Team Impul | Nissan GT-R | GT500 | SUZ | OKA | FUJ | SEP | SUG; 12 | | | | | 22nd | 10 |
| 2008 | Nismo | Nissan GT-R | GT500 | | | | | | SUZ; 4 | MOT | AUT | FUJ | 22nd | 10 |

=== 24 Hours of Le Mans results ===
| Year | Team | Co-Drivers | Car | Class | Laps | Pos. | Class Pos. |
|---|---|---|---|---|---|---|---|
| 2005 | (France) Courage Compétition | (Switzerland) Alexander Frei (United Kingdom) Christian Vann | Courage C60H-Judd | LMP1 | 339 | 8th | 6th |

=== Complete GT1 World Championship results ===
| Year | Team | Car | 1 | 2 | 3 | 4 | 5 | 6 | 7 | 8 | 9 | 10 | 11 | 12 | 13 | 14 | 15 | 16 | 17 | 18 | 19 | 20 | Pos | Points |
|---|---|---|---|---|---|---|---|---|---|---|---|---|---|---|---|---|---|---|---|---|---|---|---|---|
| 2010 | All-Inkl.com Münnich Motorsport | Lamborghini | ABU; QR; Ret | ABU; CR; Ret | SIL; QR; 20 | SIL; CR; 12 | BRN; QR; 4 | BRN; CR; 7 | PRI; QR; 15 | PRI; CR; 12 | SPA; QR; 5 | SPA; CR; 9 | NÜR; QR; 11 | NÜR; CR; Ret | ALG; QR; 8 | ALG; CR; Ret | NAV; QR; Ret | NAV; CR; 9 | INT; QR; 5 | INT; CR; 7 | SAN; QR; 9 | SAN; CR; 11 | 32nd | 16 |
| 2011 | All-Inkl.com Münnich Motorsport | Lamborghini | ABU; QR; Ret | ABU; CR; 11 | ZOL; QR; Ret | ZOL; CR; Ret | ALG; QR; 5 | ALG; CR; 4 | SAC; QR; 7 | SAC; CR; 2 | SIL; QR; 6 | SIL; CR; 10 | NAV; QR; 2 | NAV; CR; 1 | PRI; QR; Ret | PRI; CR; 9 | ORD; QR; 6 | ORD; CR; 6 | BEI; QR; 9 | BEI; CR; Ret | SAN; QR; 3 | SAN; CR; Ret | 8th | 80 |
