= Lexus LFA =

Japanese sports car

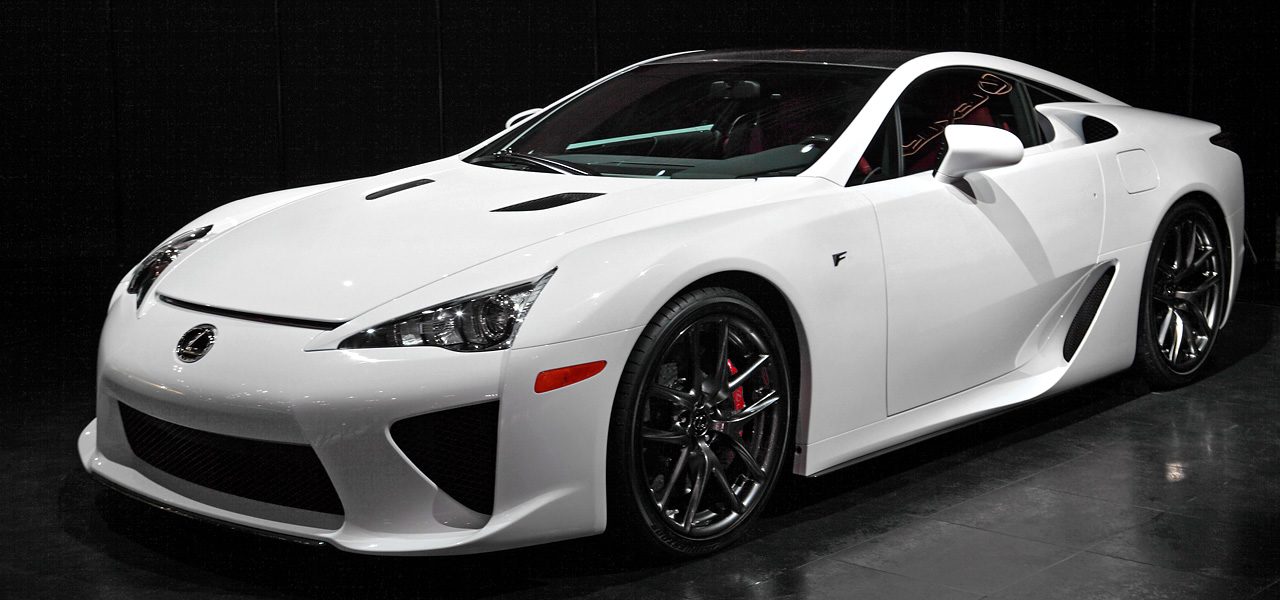
- Lexus LFA at the 2009 Tokyo Motor Show

Overview
- Manufacturer: Toyota
- Model code: LFA10
- Production: December 2010 – December 2012; 500 units
- Assembly: Japan: Toyota, Aichi (Motomachi plant)
- Designer: Kengo Matsumoto (chief designer)

Body and chassis
- Class: Sports car (S)
- Body style: 2-door coupé
- Layout: Front mid-engine, rear-wheel-drive

Powertrain
- Engine: 4.8 L 1LR-GUE even-firing V10
- Transmission: 6-speed Aisin SA6 automated manual

Dimensions
- Wheelbase: 2,605 mm (102.6 in)
- Length: 4,505 mm (177.4 in)
- Width: 1,895 mm (74.6 in)
- Height: 1,220 mm (48.0 in)
- Curb weight: 1,580 kg (3,483 lb)

The Lexus LFA (Japanese: レクサス・LFA, Rekusasu LFA) is a two-door sports car produced between 2010 and 2012 by the Japanese carmaker Toyota under its luxury marque, Lexus. Lexus built 500 units over its production span of two years.

The development of the LFA, codenamed TXS, began in early 2000. The first prototype was completed in June 2003, with regular testing at the Nürburgring starting in October 2004. Over the decade, numerous concept cars were unveiled at various motor shows and the first concept appeared in January 2005 at the North American International Auto Show as a design study. In January 2007, a more aerodynamic design was introduced, and in January 2008, a roadster version was showcased. The production version of the LFA debuted at the Tokyo Motor Show in October 2009—commemorating Lexus's 20th anniversary—and the official manufacture of the car began on 15 December 2010 at the Motomachi production facility in Toyota, Aichi. Production ended in 2012.

The 4.8 L 1LR-GUE V10 engine built by Toyota in collaboration with Yamaha, as fitted to the LFA, produces a power output of 412 kilowatts (560 PS; 553 hp) and 480 newton-metres (350 lb⋅ft), sufficient to give the car a 0–97 km/h (60 mph) of 3.6 seconds and a maximum speed of 325 kilometres per hour (202 mph). The LFA's body mass is composed of sixty-five per cent carbon fibre-reinforced polymer, and incorporates various lightweight materials such as aluminium, titanium and magnesium. Lexus ended production of the LFA on 17 December 2012, two years and two days after it commenced. The LFA has received awards including Road & Track's "Best of the 2009 Tokyo Auto Show" and Top Gear's "5 Greatest Supercars of the Year".

== Development ==
=== 2000–2004 ===
The LF-A sports car began development with a codename of TXS, which was intended to showcase the performance capabilities of Toyota Motor Corporation and its Lexus marque. The first prototype was completed during June 2003. Prototypes of the LF-A were spotted regularly undergoing testing at the Nürburgring, the famous motorsport race track in Nürburg, Germany, since October 2004. Numerous test vehicles had been equipped with automatic retractable rear spoilers, and carbon ceramic brake discs.

=== 2005–2006 ===
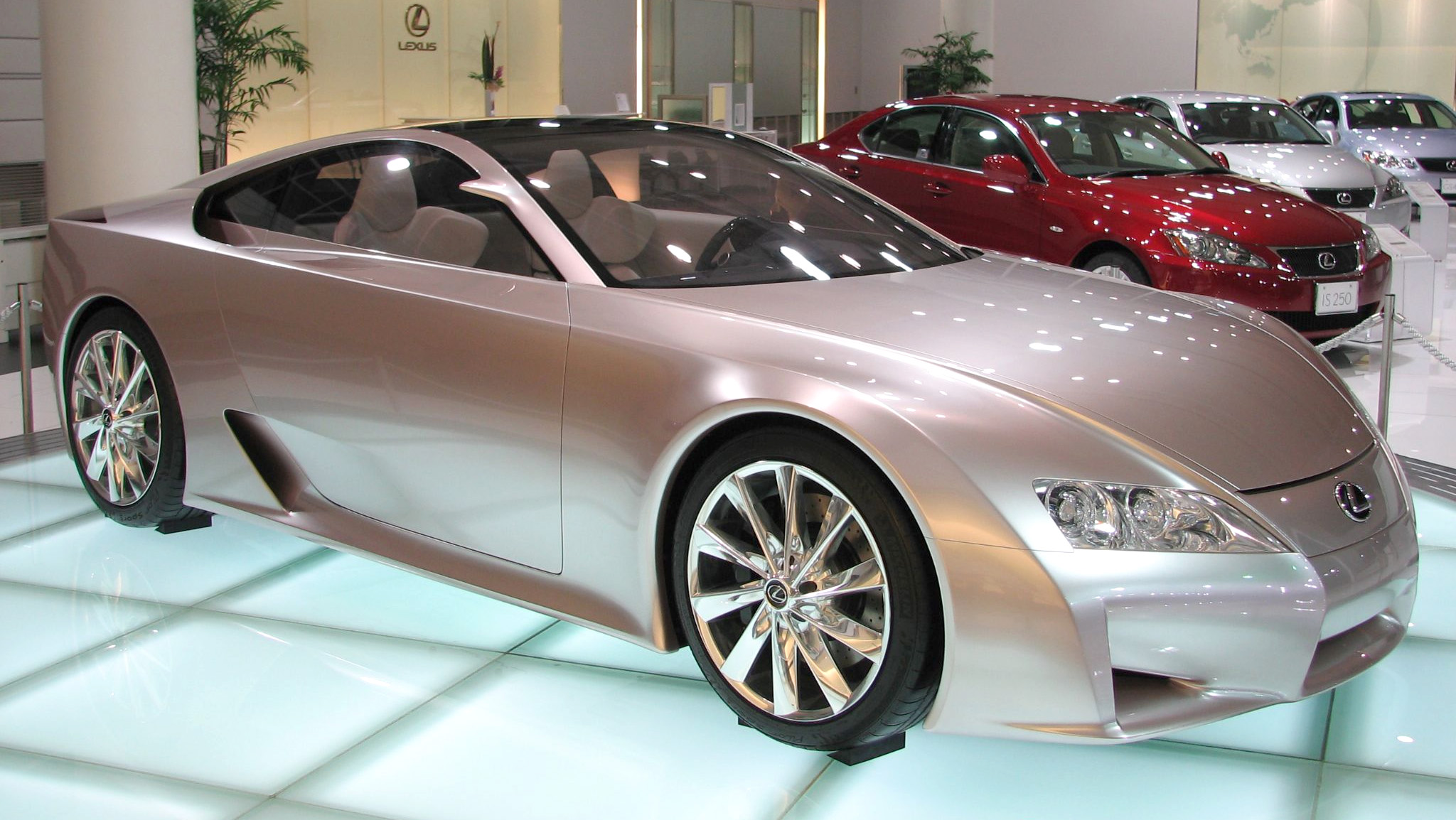
The LF-A concept on display

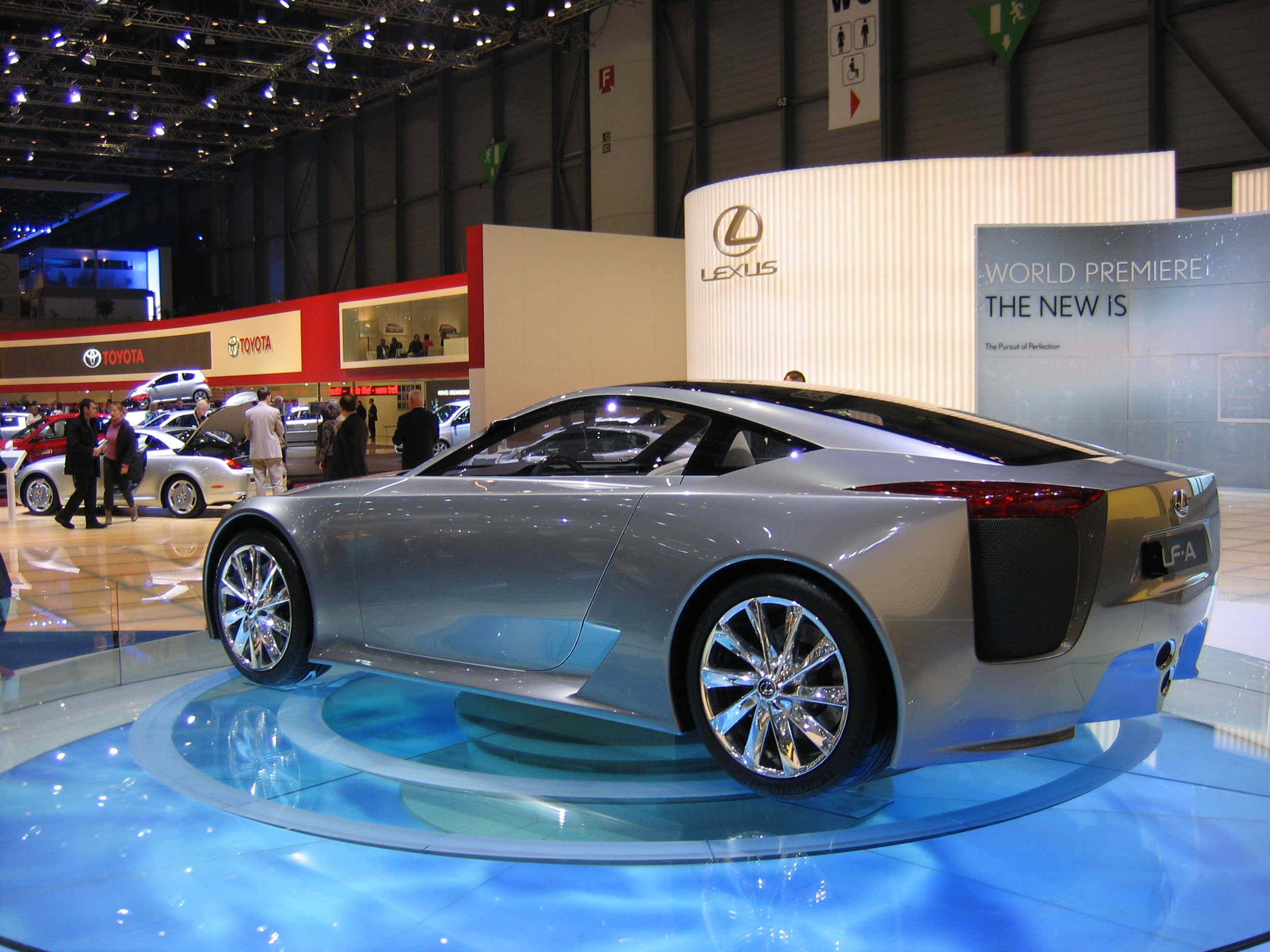
The first Lexus LF-A concept at the 2005 Geneva Motor Show

In January 2005, the first LF-A concept premiered at the North American International Auto Show in Detroit, Michigan as a design study with no plans for production. Design was a collaboration between Toyota and Italian designer Leonardo Fioravanti. The first LF-A concept had an overall length of 4,399 mm (173.2 in), while its wheelbase measured 2,581 mm (101.6 in) The concept was nearly 1,219 mm (48 in) in height, with a width of 1,859 mm (73.2 in). Some news outlets reported the concept name as referring to Lexus Future-Advance, a claim later dismissed by Chief Engineer Haruhiko Tanahashi. The first LF-A concept featured a glass roof and side cameras mounted in the side mirrors. Twin rear radiators were installed behind the rear wheels, and visible behind large screens. The rear bumper featured a triple exhaust placed in an inverted triangle formation. The wheels were shaped like turbines, and air-scoops were placed on the C-pillars. Following enthusiastic public reaction for the LF-A concept on the auto show circuit, development continued with a greater emphasis on a possible production model. Concurrently, Lexus was preparing for the launch of its long-rumored F marque series of performance vehicles, with a production LF-A being a possible future member of this lineup. Reports in 2006 suggested that the LF-A concept car had received the green-light for production, however these reports were not officially confirmed.

=== 2007–2008 ===
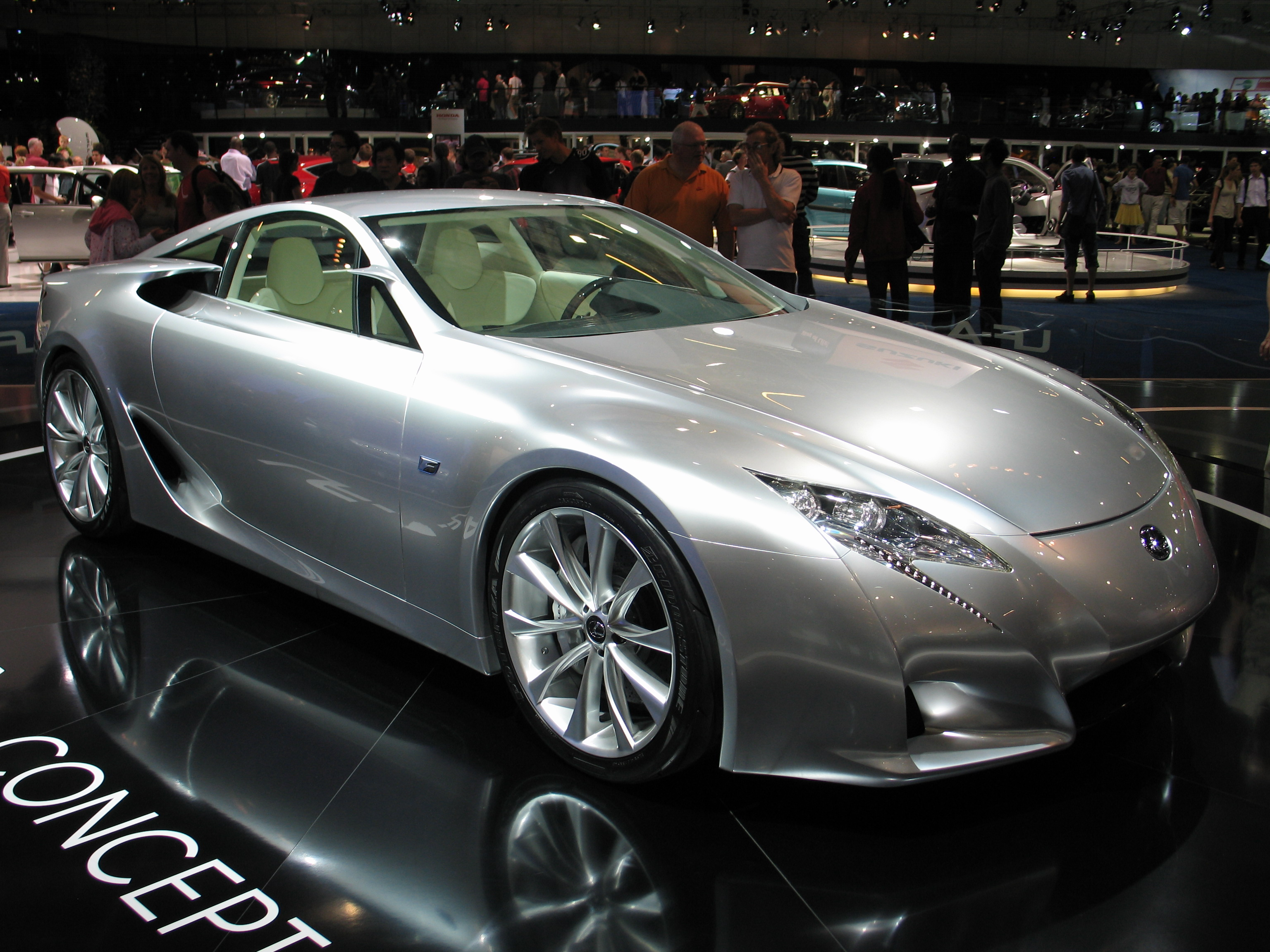

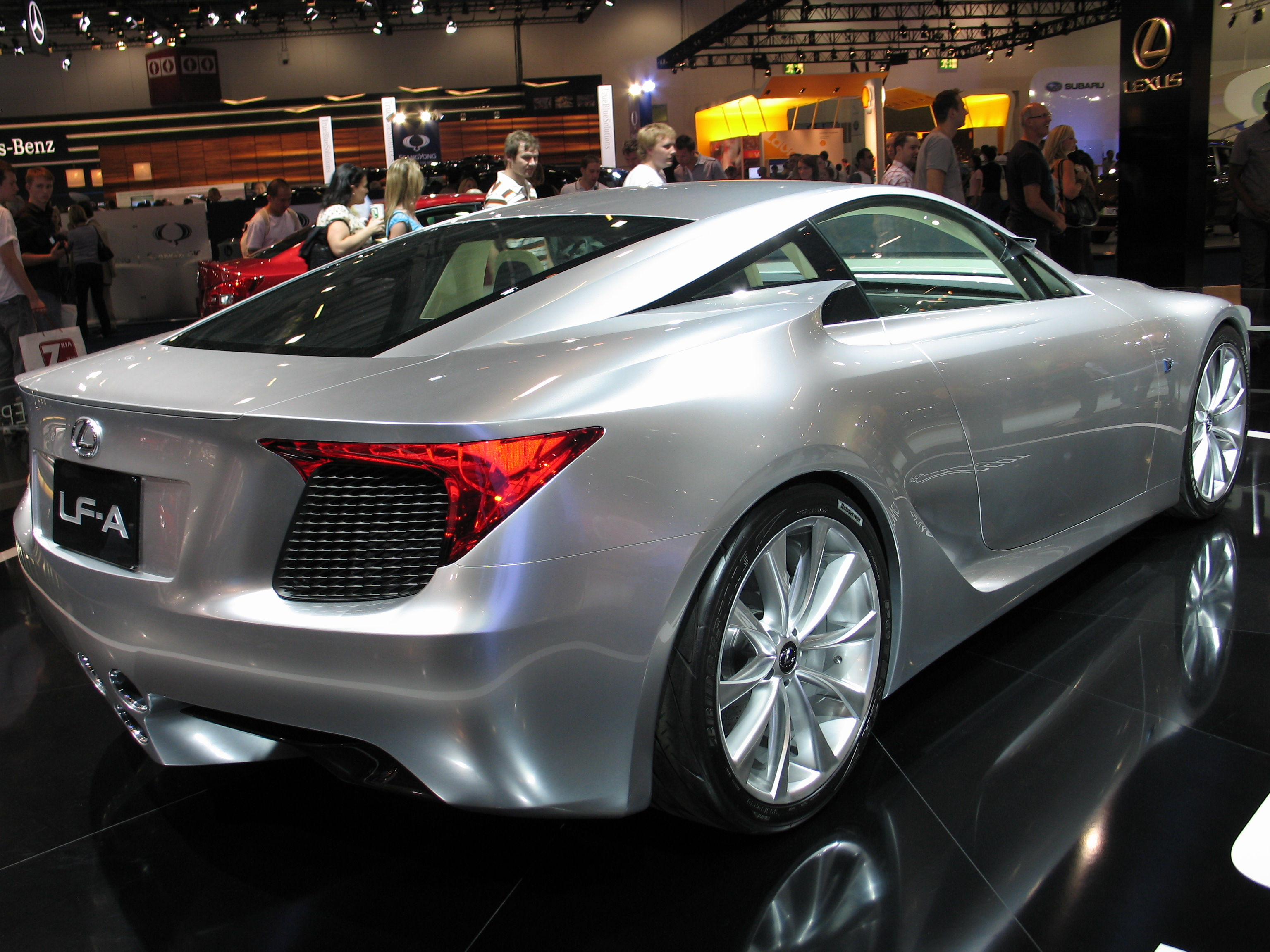
The second Lexus LF-A concept

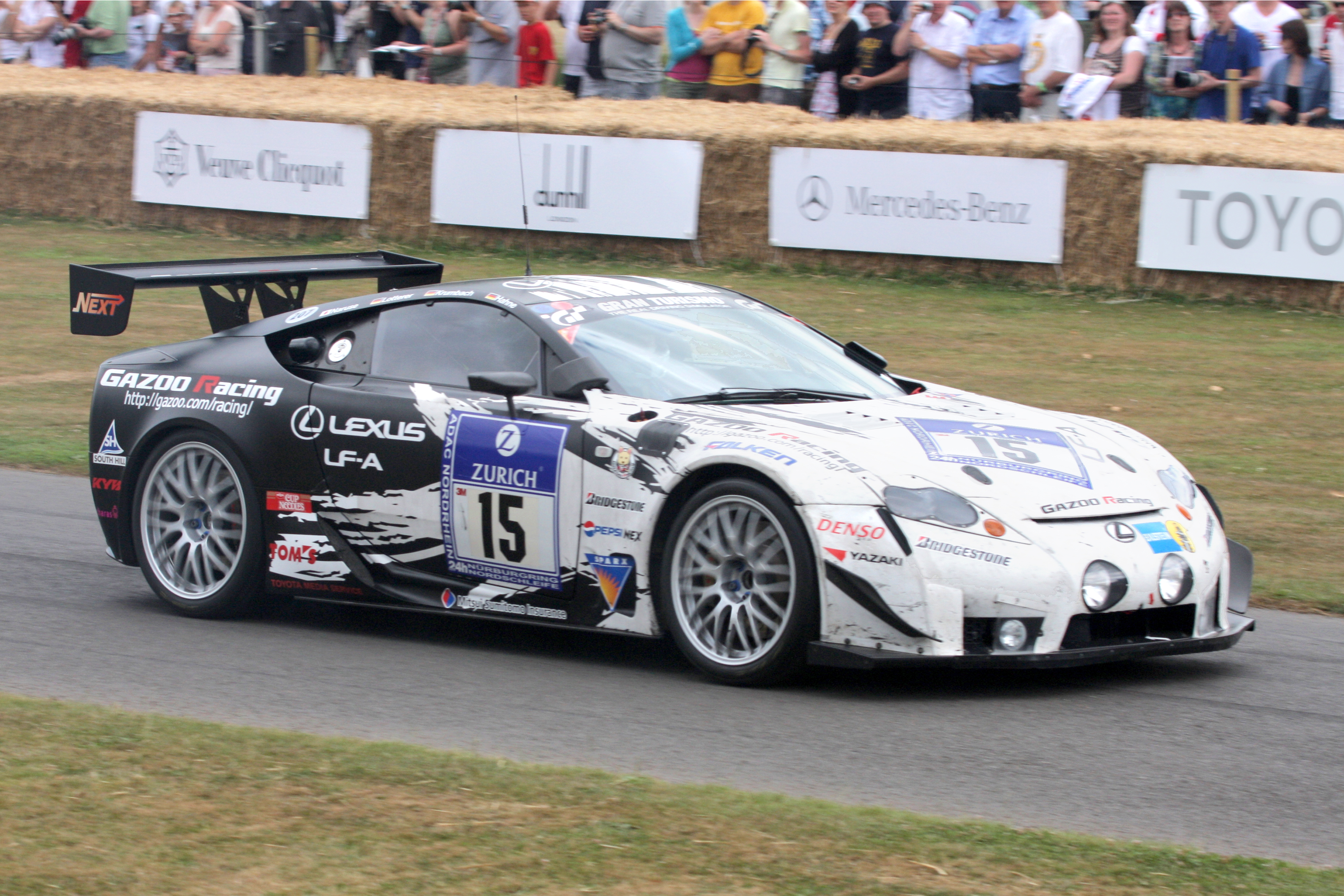
The Lexus LF-A racing concept

Following the original LF-A concept, development time was lengthened by the switch from an aluminum frame to a carbon-fibre tub, the result of engineering efforts aimed at improving the LF-A's power-to-weight ratio. The LF-A was reported to draw engineering resources from Toyota's Formula One team. In January 2007, a restyled LF-A concept car premiered alongside the first production F marque vehicle, the IS F sports sedan. The second LF-A concept featured a more aerodynamic exterior, a near-production interior, and F marque emblems. Later that year, Lexus Great Britain director Steve Settle indicated plans for a V10 and hybrid version of the LF-A. The hybrid version, combining a petrol engine with electric motors, was to feature a V8 powertrain similar to that designed for the Lexus LS 600h L. LF-A test mules continued to be spotted at the Nürburgring, including early models with a large, fixed rear wing. In December 2007, Auto Express reported that the LF-A had set an unofficial 7:24 lap at the Nürburgring.

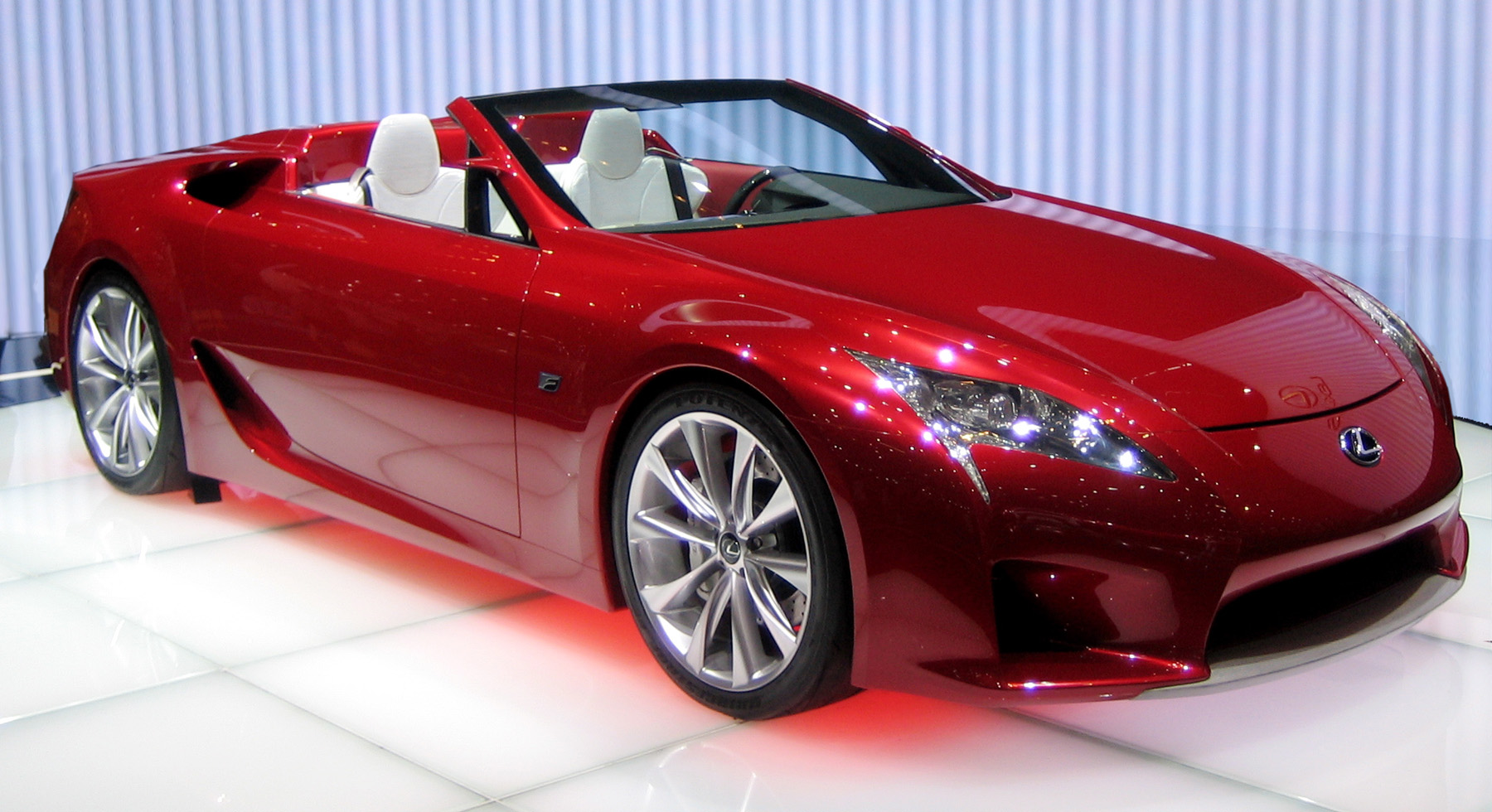
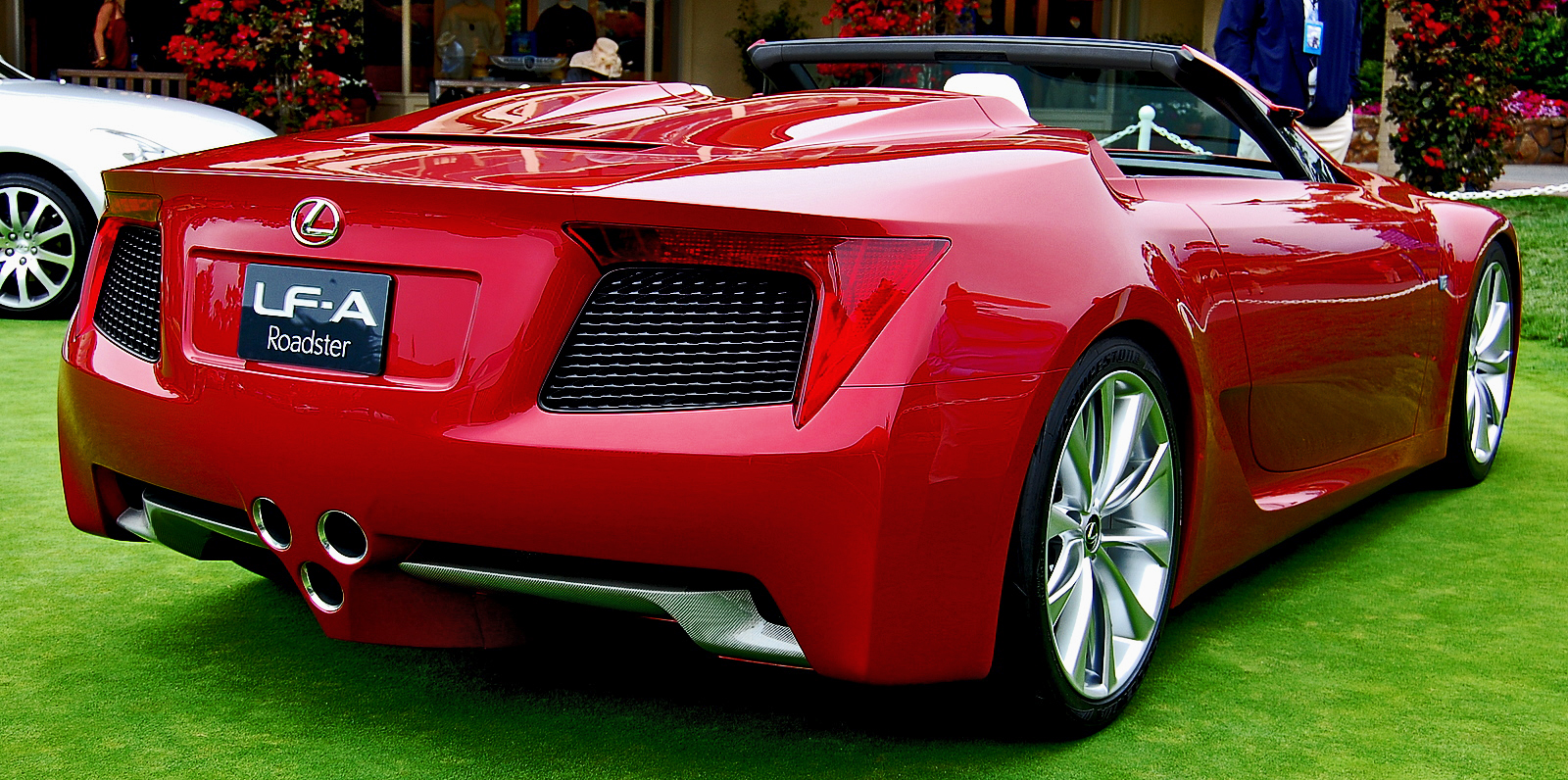
The Lexus LF-A Roadster concept

In January 2008, Lexus displayed a roadster version of the LF-A concept car designated LF-A Roadster, or LF-AR, at the North American International Auto Show. Initial specifications for the roadster were a V10 engine having a displacement of 5.0 L and rated at over 373 kW (500 hp). The car's top speed was reported to be over 322 km/h (200 mph). Automotive photographers capturing the LF-A in various test guises had photographed a disguised convertible test model, dubbed LF-A Spyder, on the Nürburgring as early as October 2005. After its debut at the 2008 North American International Auto Show, the LF-A Roadster was also shown at the 2008 Pebble Beach Concours d'Elegance, the 2008 Geneva Motor Show, the United States Open Championship tournament, and at Lexus exhibits in Japan. A single LF-A racing prototype was also entered into Veranstaltergemeinschaft Langstreckenpokal Nürburgring endurance races at the Nürburgring in May 2008, competing in the SP8 class of VLN events. Media reports uncovered an LFA trademark filing with the United States Patent and Trademark Office in December 2008, with the concept LF-A name dropping its hyphen to become LFA for a possible production model.

The second LF-A concepts had an overall length of 4,460 mm (175.6 in), and a wheelbase of 2,598 mm (102.3 in); height remained the same as the prior concept, while width grew to 1,895 mm (74.6 in). While the original LF-A had been strictly a concept model, the second concept's design reflected engineering analysis for possible production. The exterior design had been restyled to take advantage of the flexibility offered by carbon-fibre construction, with improved aerodynamics and surface features aimed at improving the car's overall top speed. The reshaped exterior featured smoother lines with additional detailing, and more curved surfaces. The aft radiator cooling vents were retained, but integrated into the rear fascia, and the lower side and front air intakes were restyled, along with the forward fascia and headlamps. Designers reportedly drew inspiration from the 1965 2000GT sports coupé, which was also produced in a front-engine, rear-wheel drive layout, and represented the combination of Japanese technology and design ethics in a sports car. However, no design features on the LF-A were directly derived from the 2000GT. The second LF-A concept and accompanying LF-A Roadster were also equipped with a retractable rear wing for improved handling at speed and a two-seat interior with a two-tone colour scheme.

=== 2009 ===
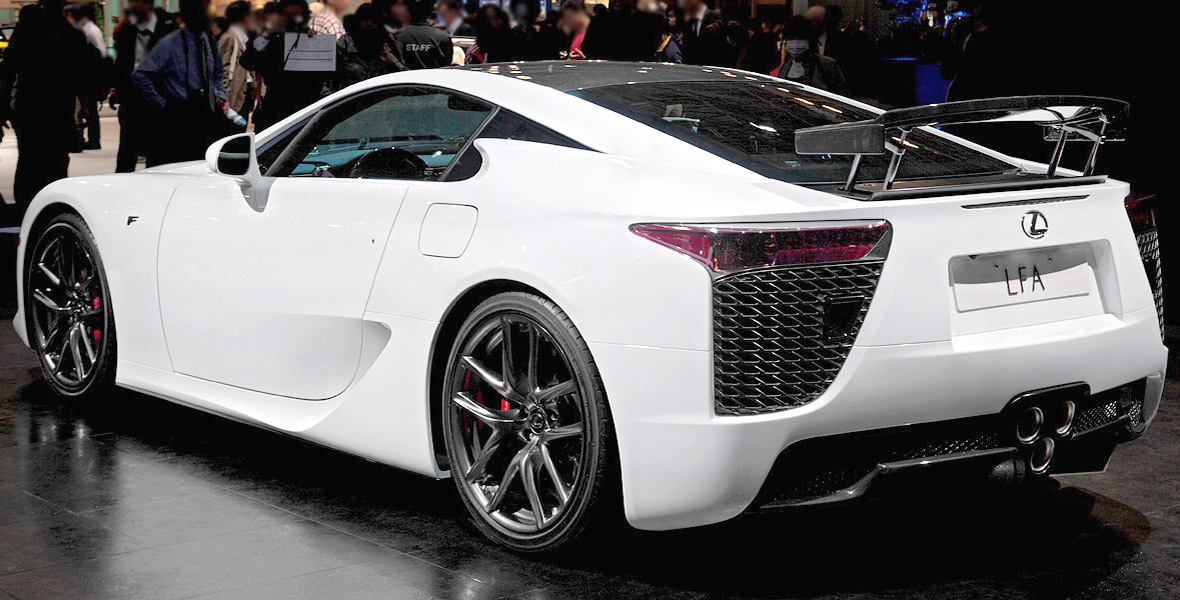
The production Lexus LFA at the 2009 Tokyo Motor Show.

On 5 August 2009, Toyota's new CEO, Akio Toyoda, publicly confirmed production of the LF-A in his speech at a conference held at the Center for Automotive Research in the United States. The production vehicles were expected to carry V10 engines.

Two LF-A prototypes had also competed at Nürburgring VLN endurance races in mid-2009. In September 2009, reports in Japanese automotive magazines indicated that the 4.8 L V10 engine for the LF-A would carry a 1LR designation. A subsequent television ad for the Japanese market showed the pre-production LFA testing at the Fuji Speedway.

On 21 October 2009, the production version of the Lexus LFA was unveiled on the first press day of the 41st biennial Tokyo Motor Show. The car was introduced by Akio Toyoda at a press conference, in which it was disclosed that the vehicle would be limited to 500 production copies. The car carried the same designation as the concepts, LFA, but without the hyphen. The production designation reportedly stood for Lexus Fuji Apex, another claim dismissed by Chief Engineer Tanahashi. The LFA was shown as the final vehicle of the press conference, following the LF-Ch hybrid concept.

The production announcement for the LFA marked the 20th anniversary of the launch of Lexus. Given the high cost of construction and development, analysts did not expect LFA sales to be profitable. However, the LFA was intended to serve as a testbed for new car technologies, including carbon-fibre mass-production, and related performance vehicle development. At its debut, a circuit-ready model was also indicated for a 2012 launch.

== Production ==
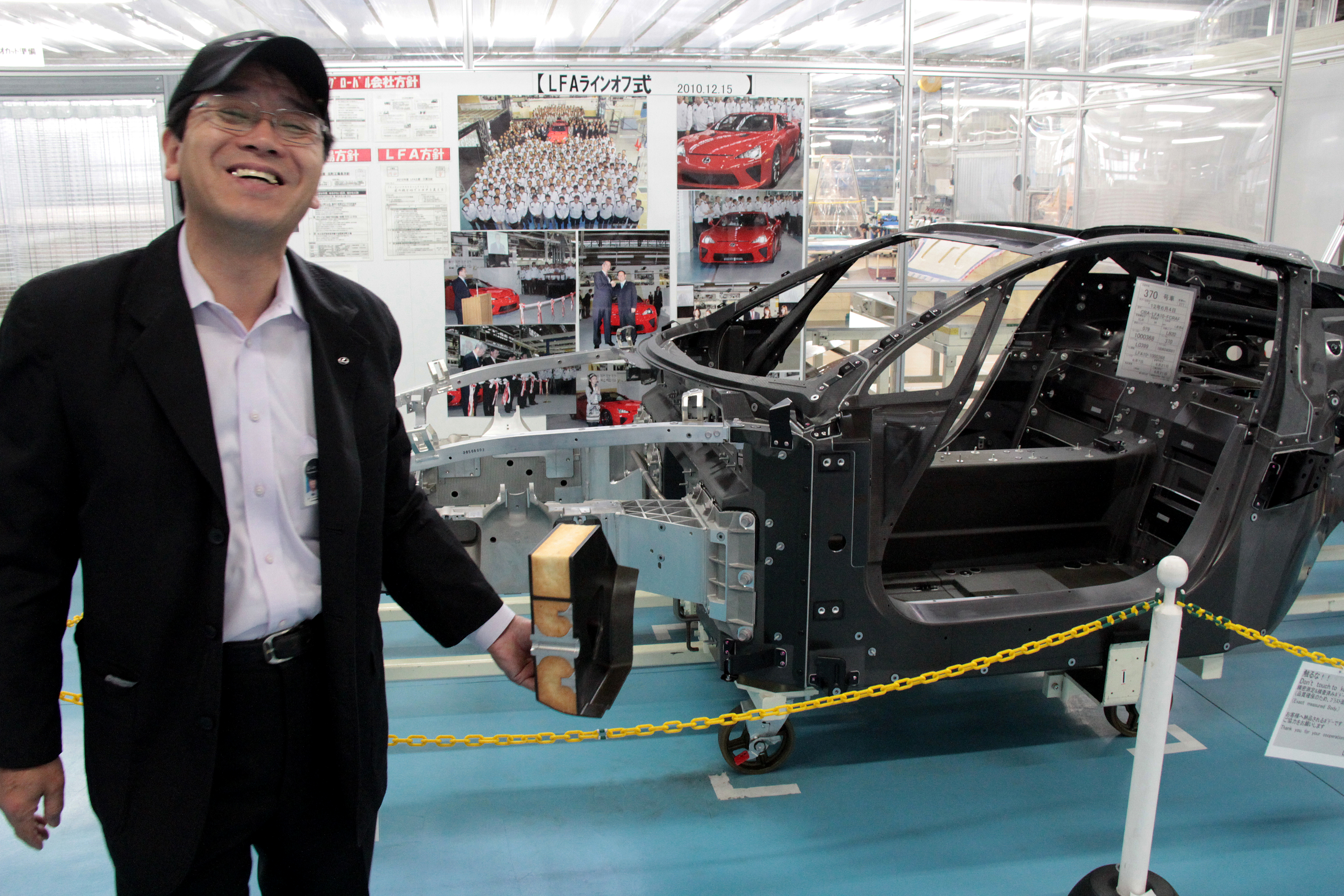
LFA Chief Engineer Haruhiko Tanahashi with piece of foamcored CFRP material in front of LFA body during production in Motomachi plant

Lexus began taking orders for the LFA on 23 October 2009. Buyers were selectively chosen by Lexus in the second quarter of 2010. Production began in December 2010. Only 500 total cars were made for worldwide markets, with only 20 produced each month with a base price of $375,000 (£340,000). Each car had to be custom ordered to the customer's specifications. Following the LFA's Introduction at the Tokyo Motor Show, Lexus unveiled a website with an 'LFA configurator', which allowed users to select exterior and interior colours, brake caliper colours, seats, steering wheel leather, and other interior designs. In total, there were over 30 billion possible combinations. Each LFA was hand-built by a dedicated production team of engineers and specialists at Toyota's Motomatchi plant in Aichi, Japan.

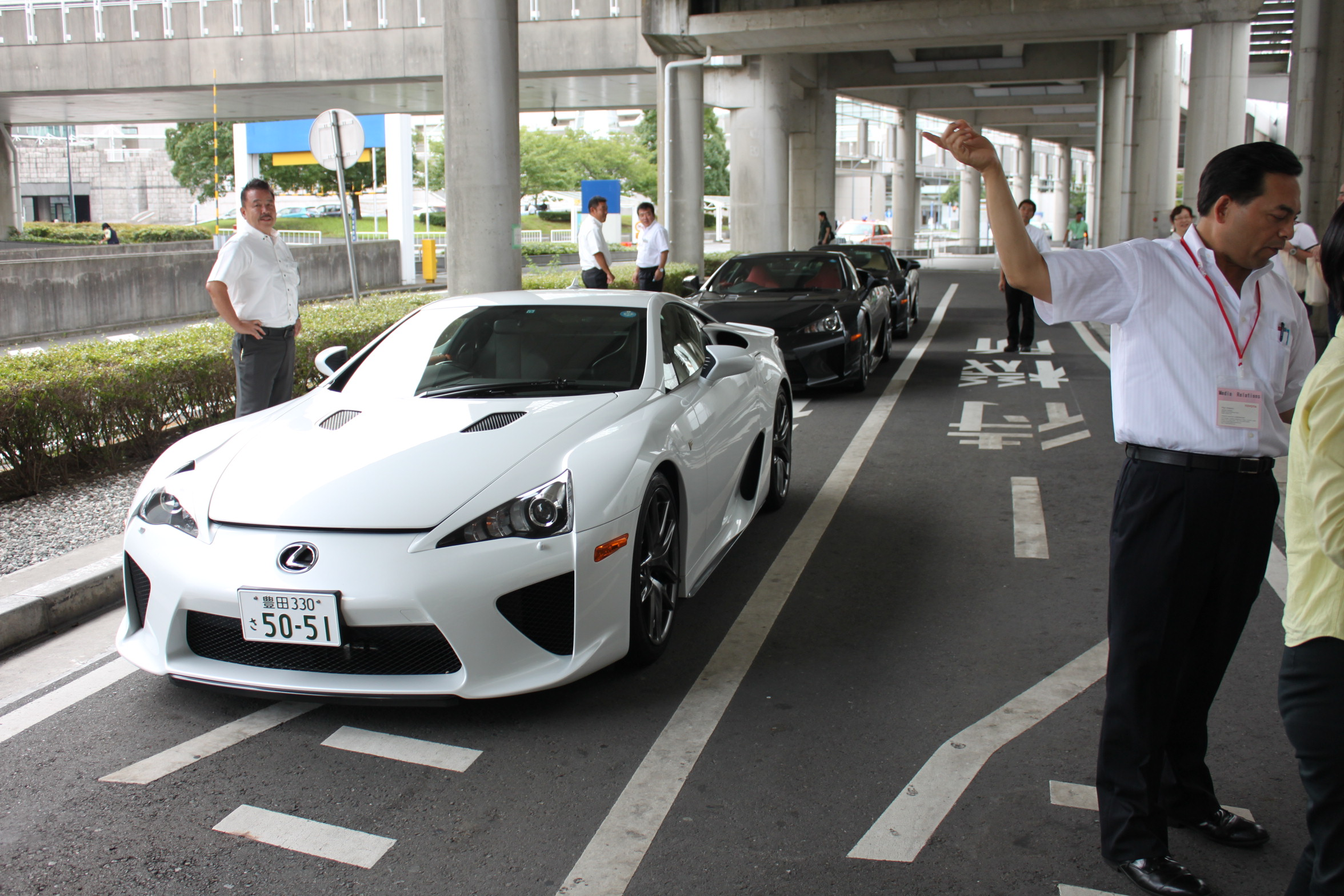
Production LFAs, lined up in Yokohama

In the North American market, 150 cars were initially sold through a two-year lease program. This was to prevent owners from reselling the vehicle for a profit. Racing driver Scott Pruett was hired to give test drives to interested buyers, demonstrating the vehicle's capabilities at Auto Club Speedway. The Lexus division of Toyota Motors USA stopped taking orders at the end of 2009, at which time they planned to open discussions about a purchase plan for the lessees. Lexus later changed their stance and allowed outright purchase, but only on the condition that they sign an agreement giving the dealer the first right of refusal to buy back the LFA if the owner wanted to sell it within the first two years. The dealer would have the option to buy back the used LFA for either fair market value or the original sticker price, whichever is lower. In the European market, buyers could order their LFA through a single Lexus dealer located in Park Lane, London where it was purchased outright.

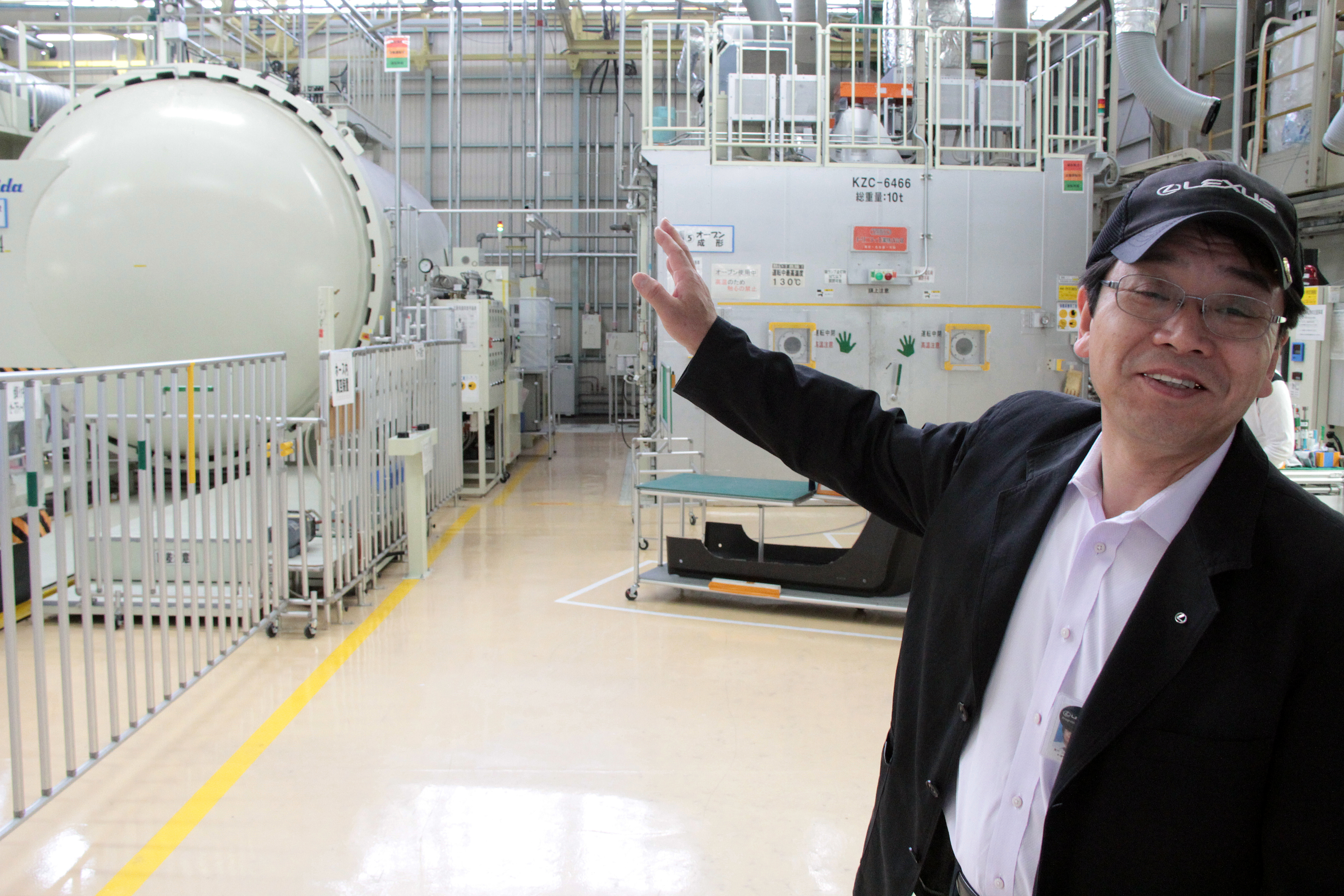
LFA Chief Engineer Haruhiko Tanahashi in front of autoclave used to cure CFRP parts

During the LFA's production, each vehicle received an individually numbered plaque, indicating the unit's place in the production run. Each LFA V10 engine carried the signature of the specialist who assembled it. With 20 units produced monthly, production of the LFA extended from December 2010 to December 2012. Production ended on 14 December 2012, with the last car finished in white exterior colour and equipped with the Nürburgring package. When production ended, no successor was scheduled. The LFA plant in Motomachi continued making parts with a small team.

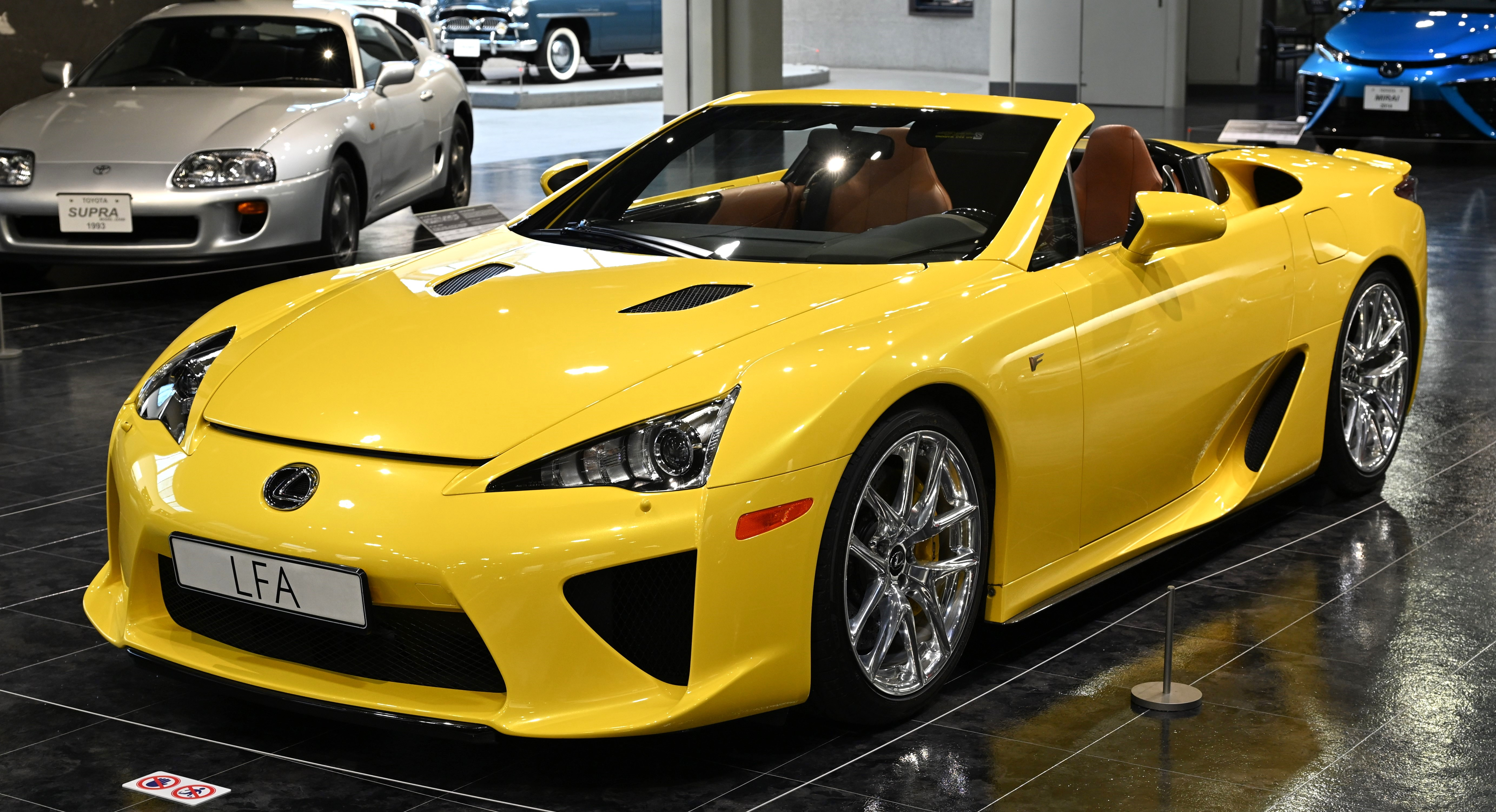
2012 LFA spider prototype

The Lexus LFA was also going to be made into a convertible version but was cancelled. Only two were ever built: one white and one yellow.

== Overview ==
=== Engine ===
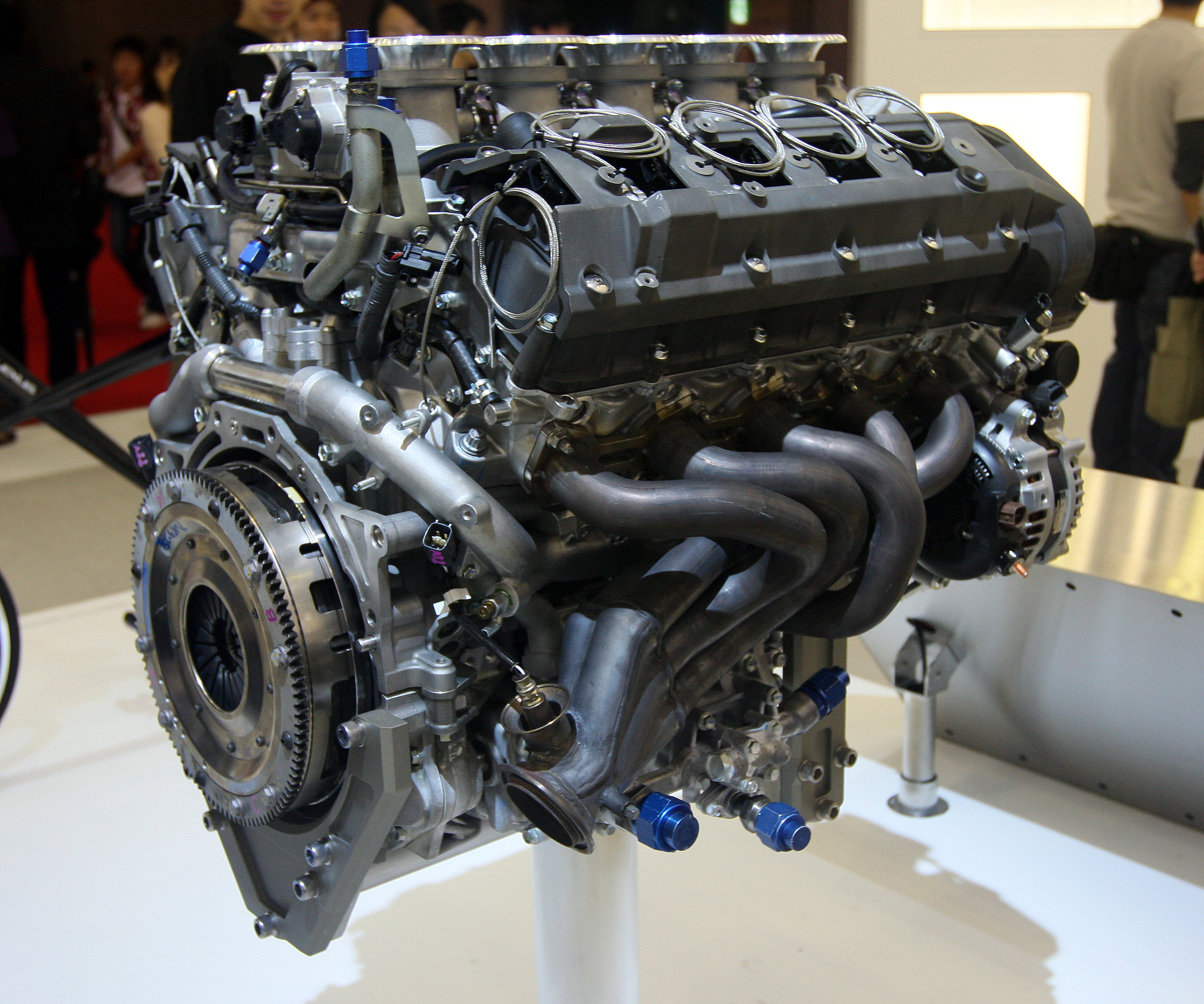
The static model of the 4.8-litre 1LR-GUE V10 engine used in the LFA

The Lexus LFA is powered by a 72-degree bank angle 4,805 cc (4.8 L; 293.2 cu in) V10 engine equipped with Dual VVT-i carrying the 1LR-GUE designation with a maximum output of 412 kW (560 PS; 553 hp) delivered at 8,700 rpm. It was developed in partnership with Yamaha Motor Company, incorporating engine technologies such as a cylinder head derived from racing applications, as well as acoustic engineering from Yamaha. Its maximum torque output of 480 N⋅m (354 lb⋅ft) arrives at 6,800 rpm, 90 percent of which is available from 3,700 rpm. The engine redlines at 9,000 rpm, but with a fuel cutoff set at 9,500 rpm, and is constructed using forged aluminum pistons, forged titanium connecting rods, and solid titanium valves. The V-angle of the LFA's V-10 engine is set to 72-degrees, which allows for even firing from the pistons without the use of a split-journal crankshaft, thus improving engine efficiency as well as lowering the overall weight. Dry sump lubrication prevents engine oil starvation through high-speed corners and lowers the engine's center of mass. Air is fed directly from beneath the hood through a visible slit passing into a dual-stage variable intake manifold and then into ten individual throttle bodies before finally exiting from a dual-stage titanium muffler.

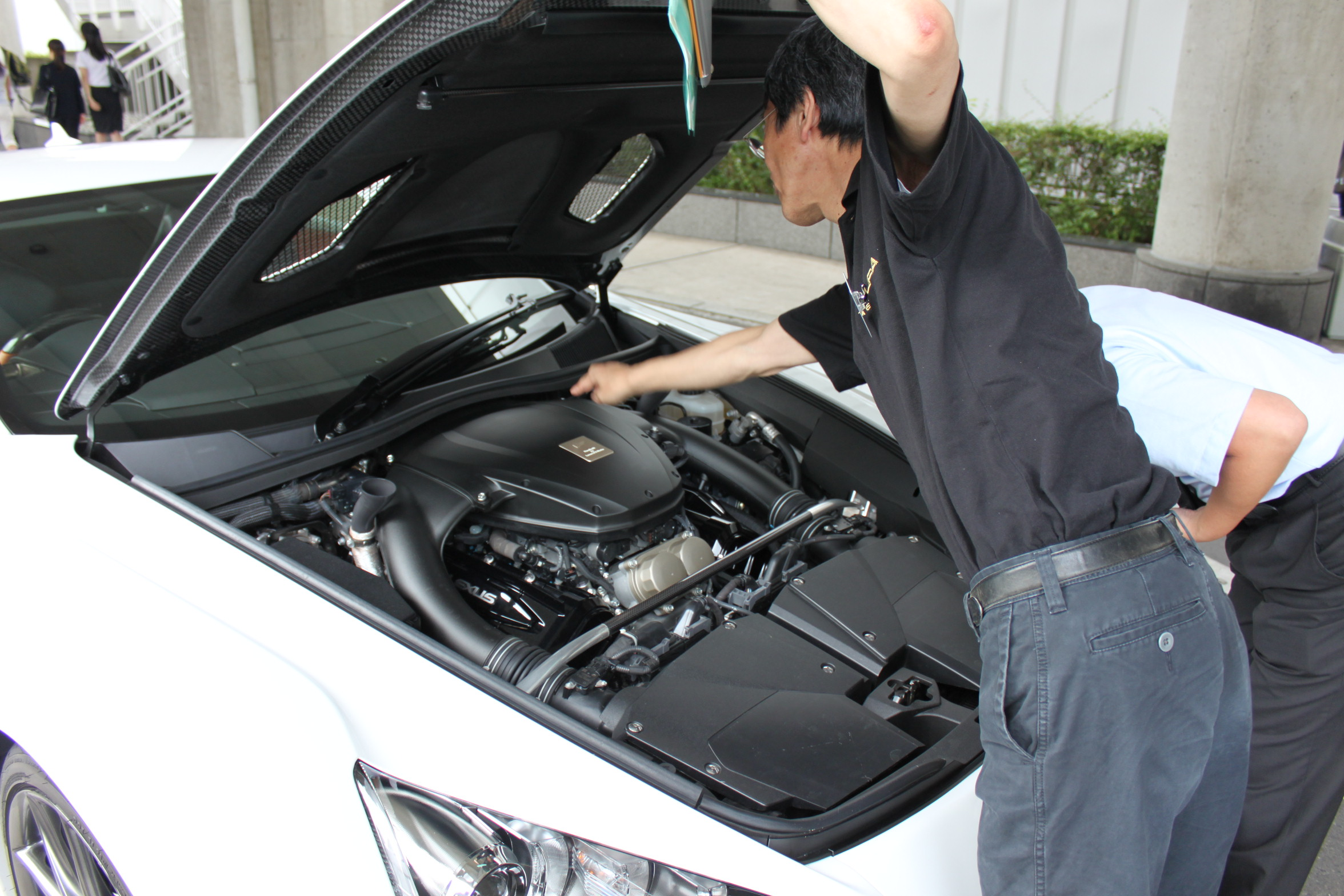
LFA Deputy Chief Engineer Chiharu Tamura explains LFA engine

The LFA's engineers selected a V10 engine over an equivalent displacement V8 engine for its ability to rev higher, and over a V12 for its lower reciprocating mass, allowing for more rapid engine response. Lexus claimed their engine could rev from idle to its redline in 0.6 seconds and an analog tachometer needle could not accurately track the LFA's changes in engine speeds. This necessitated the use of a digital tachometer which can instantly display engine speed. The engine reportedly weighs less than the manufacturer's own 3.5-litre 2GR-FE V6 engine. Engineers attempted to make the engine sound like that of a Formula One car with high revs, while at the same time maintaining reliability and vibration control. Along with other manufacturers such as Ferrari, Toyota had produced its own F1 engines and chassis designs. The exhaust note has been described by Toyota engineers as the "roar of an angel", and a US television spot later used the engine sound to shatter a champagne glass via resonance frequency.

Lexus LFA at Goodwood Festival of Speed 2010

Lexus LFA 1LR-GUE V10 revving

The powerplant gives the LFA a weight-to-power ratio of 2.67 kg/hp and enables it to reach a top speed of around 325 km/h (202 mph). Unlike the IS F's 2UR-GSE engine, Yamaha co-developed the entire engine, and not just the cylinder heads. The engine exceeds Euro V emissions. The engine is installed with a front mid-engine placement. According to Chief Engineer Haruhiko Tanahashi a front engine layout was selected instead of a mid engine layout as it is inherently more forgiving dynamically, affording less experienced drivers a wider safety net.

=== Transmission ===
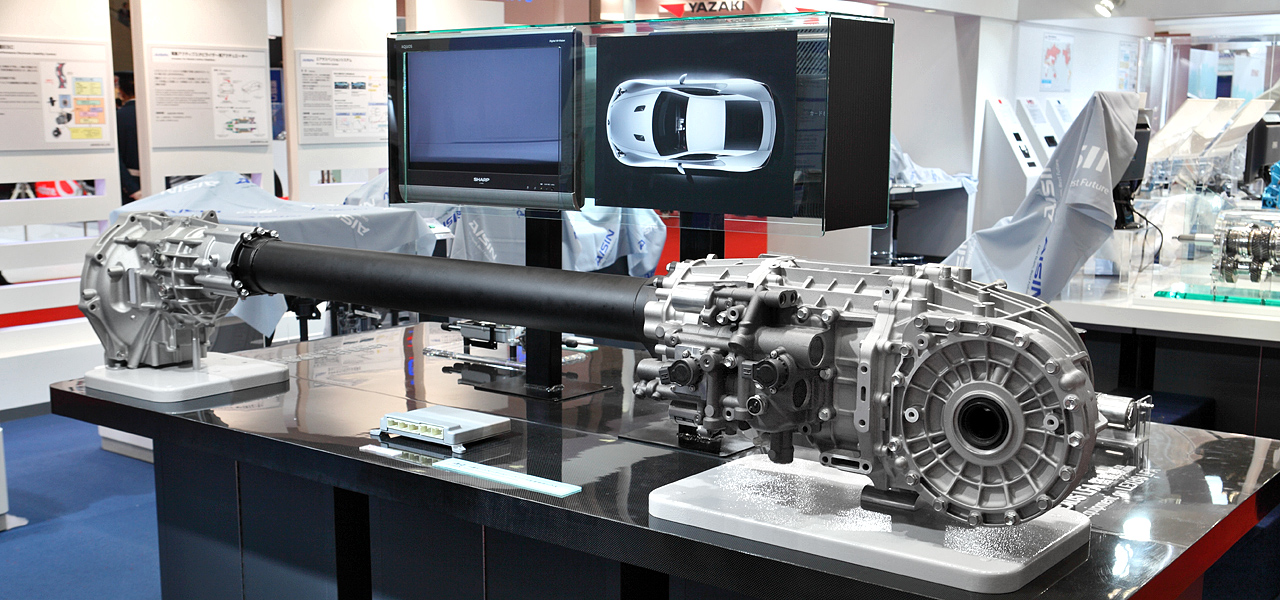
The LFA front counter gearbox, torque tube, and transaxle

The gearbox built by Aisin is a six-speed single-clutch automated manual transmission actuated with paddle-shifters. Lexus initially sought to use a dual-clutch transmission, but decided that the shift feel was too smooth. Instead, they opted for an automated sequential gearbox, a system previously developed for the Toyota MR2 by Norwegian technology company Kongsberg Devotek (now Semcon). While much of the software and control system was kept, Devotek adapted the mechanics and hydraulics to match the increased performance demands of the LFA.

=== Chassis ===
The Lexus LFA's frame is made from an in-house designed and manufactured carbon fibre-reinforced polymer (CFRP) centre monocoque with aluminium front and rear subframes. The subframes, which can be removed and replaced minimising potential repair costs, are joined to the monocoque using a newly developed aluminum flanged collar designed to create a stronger joint. According to the manufacturer, the quality of the CFRP material matches that of aeronautical grades and is woven by a laser monitored circular loom, one of only two in the world. Overall 65% of the vehicle's total body mass is CFRP material while the remaining 35% is aluminum. Manufacturer data indicates that the use of CFRP saves 100 kg (220 lb) over equivalent aluminum materials.

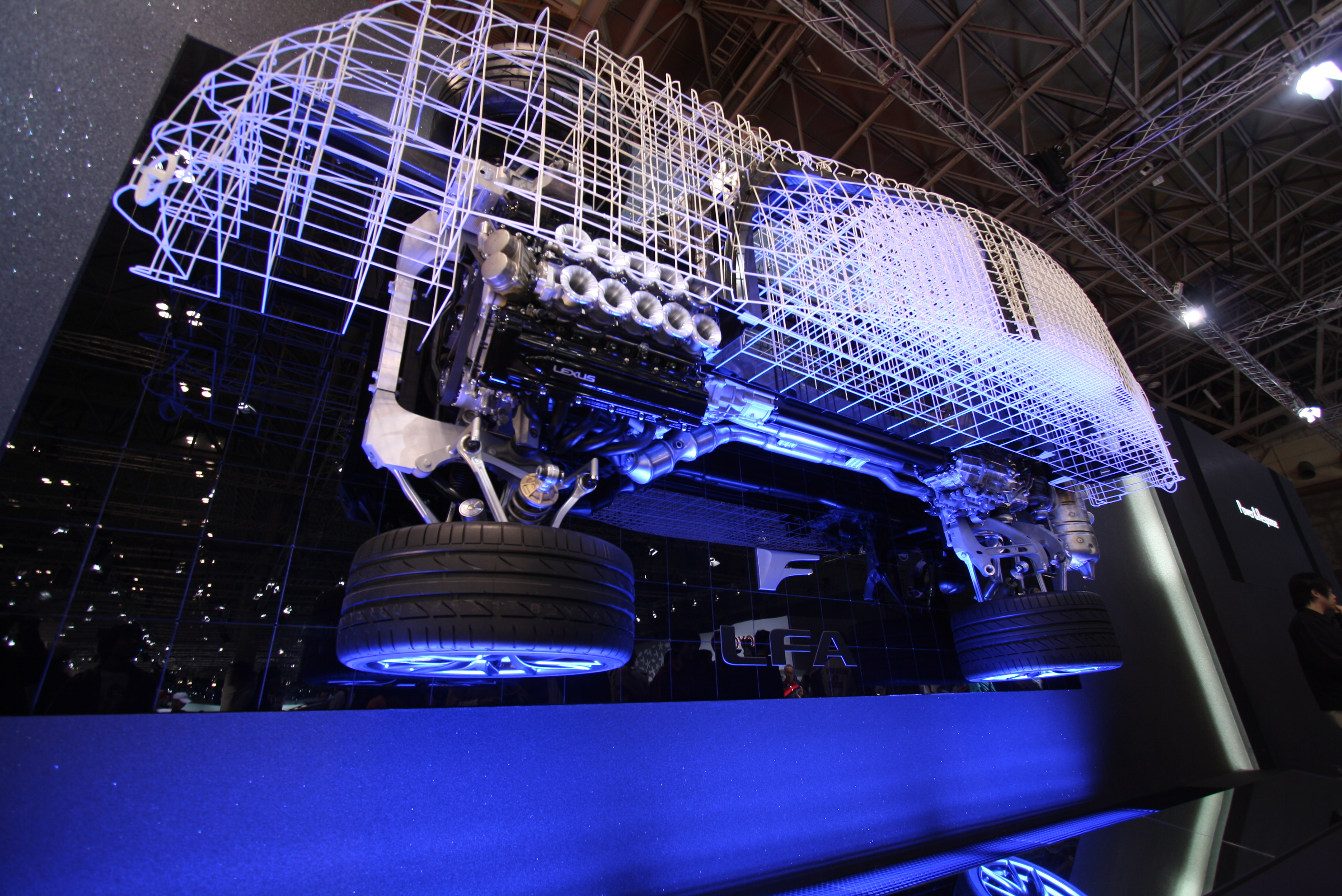
LFA chassis cutaway display

An electric power steering rack with a 14.3:1 gear ratio is used. The front suspension utilises a double-wishbone arrangement and there is a multi-link arrangement at the rear with coil-over dampers at all wheels. The dampers are a monotube design, each with a remote fluid reservoir that includes an expanding and contracting bellows: a purely mechanical system. The LFA further features six-piston front and four-piston rear Brembo monobloc brake calipers with 390 mm (15.4 in) front and 360 mm (14.2 in) rear carbon ceramic discs controlled by Toyota's Electronically Controlled Brake-by-wire system. Forged 20-inch BBS wheels fitted with 265 mm (10.4 in) front and 305 mm (12.0 in) rear Bridgestone next-generation Potenza tyres are standard. The LFA is equipped with a three-mode Vehicle Dynamics Integrated Management (VDIM) stability control system with Sport setting.

To maintain a near-ideal weight distribution, a rear transaxle is used, in addition to the mounting of the fuel tank ahead of the rear axle and the radiators at the rear. The windshield washer fluid reservoir is mounted in the center next to the fuel tank to improve further the center of weight. Overall 48% of the LFA's mass is distributed along with the front wheels with 52% at the rear. The 73 L (16 imp gal; 19 US gal) fuel tank straddles the exhaust system keeping weight centered along the left-right axis. The engine is connected to the transaxle via a rigid carbon-fibre torque tube which the exhaust system runs directly below. This stacked driveshaft and exhaust arrangement decreases the width of the centre tunnel allowing for centrally located seating.

=== Exterior ===
The LFA has an overall length of 4,506 mm (177.4 in), while its wheelbase measures 2,606 mm (102.6 in), with a height of 1,219 mm (48 in) and width of 1,895 mm (74.6 in). Compared to the prior 2007–2008 concepts, the production model is nearly 51 mm (2 in) longer, with identical width, height, and nearly same wheelbase dimensions. The exterior design of the LF-A concepts and the final production model was the work of car stylists led by Lexus Design general manager Kengo Matsumoto. The overall design ethos was based on the principle of form follows function, with aesthetics secondary to aerodynamics and operation.

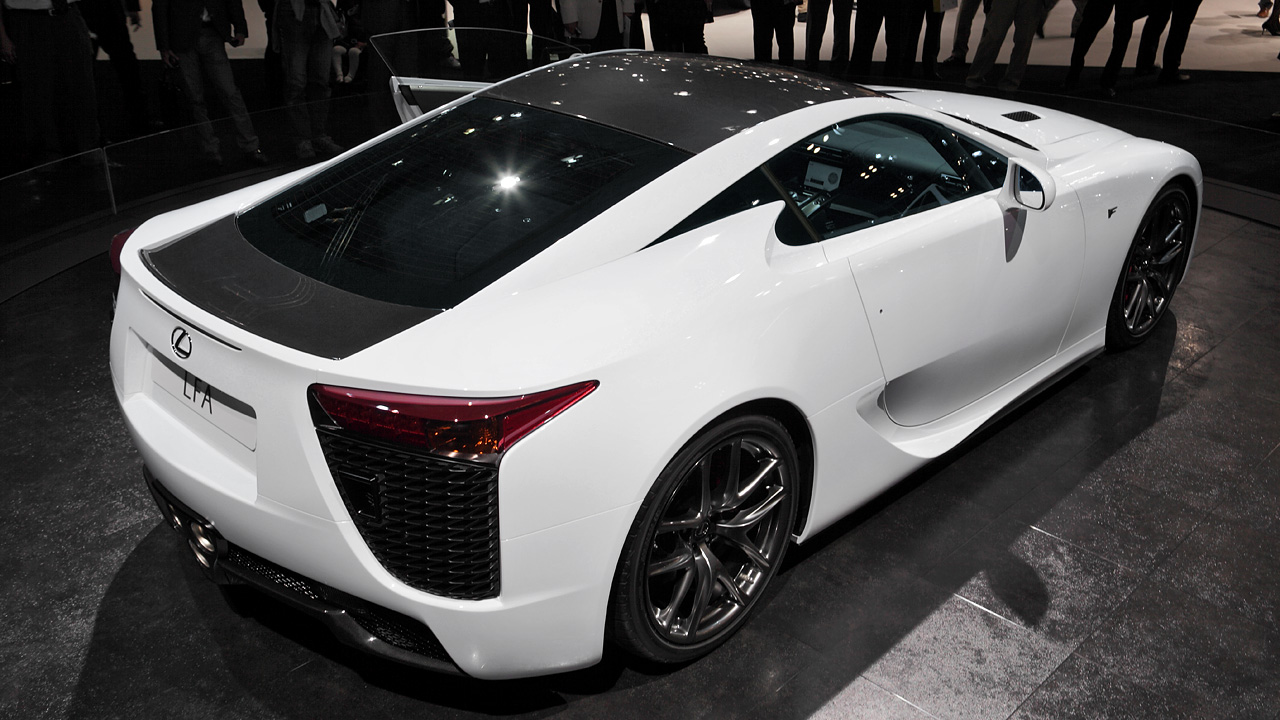
Overhead view of the Lexus LFA with carbon fibre roof

The LFA's body features sharp edges and cutoffs for improved aerodynamic performance, made possible by the carbon fiber body. The body was designed with an emphasis on downforce. There are air scoops located over the rear fenders which feed the aft-mounted radiators and help cool the brakes. A horizontal hood gap also feeds air to the engine. Two small aft vents expel air that is collected by an underbody air scoop and used to cool the titanium exhaust pipes. Dual hood ducts serve to move hot air away from the exhaust manifold.

The LFA's speed-sensitive rear wing incorporates a Gurney flap and deploys at speeds over 80 km/h (50 mph). The LFA develops 237 kg (522 lb) of downforce at maximum speed. With the wing retracted the LFA's body has a drag coefficient of Cd=0.31. The LFA body was offered with a choice of 28 standard exterior colours, along with 3 wheel colours and a matte black option. Additional special colours are available to order. The front and rear fenders, doors, roof rails, and rocker panels are made out of blast fiber reinforced sheet panels, while the tail lamps are light-emitting diode (LED) lights.

=== Interior ===
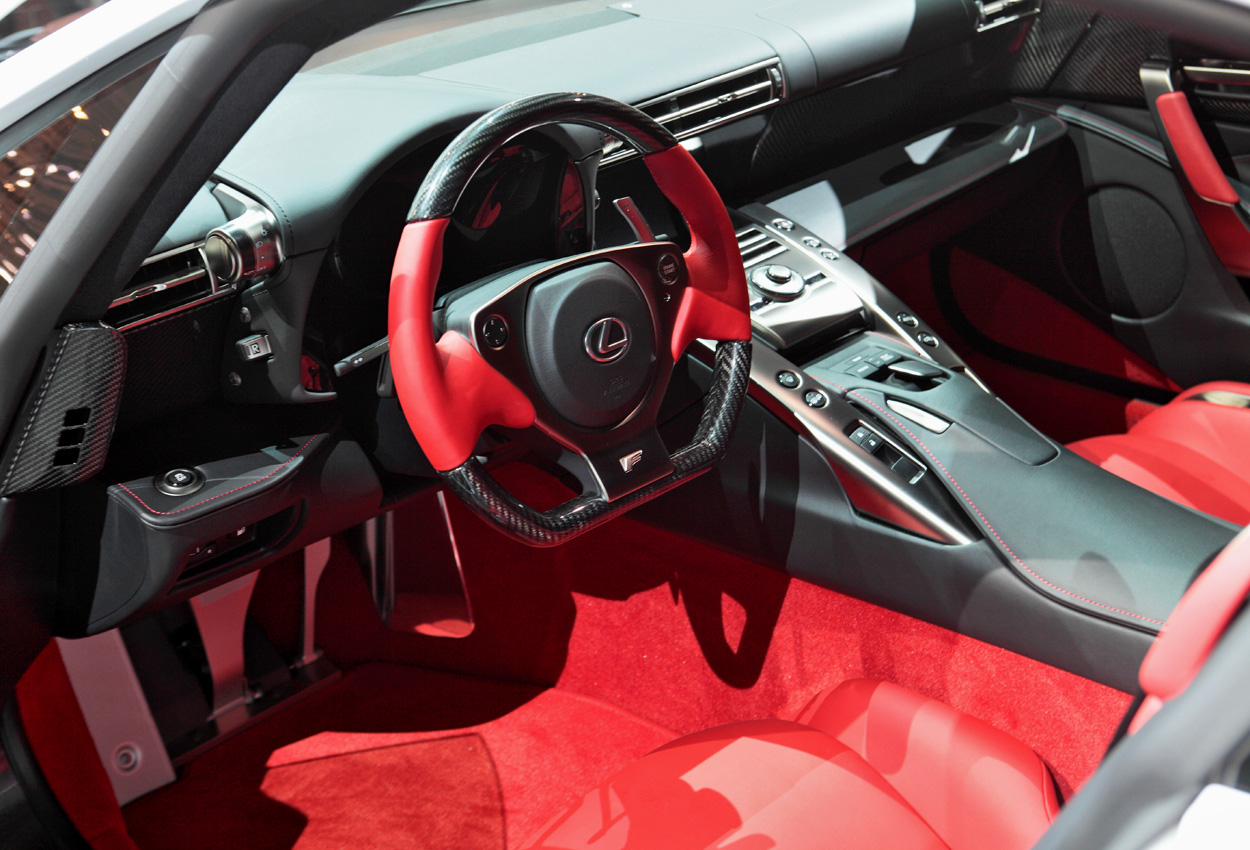
The LFA interior, customisable to owner specification

The LFA interior incorporates carbon fibre, leather, alcantara, and metallic surfaces. There are two bucket seats, and Lexus' Remote Touch controller interface. The interior design uses bespoke materials and colours. The instrument display is a digital thin-film transistor (TFT) speedometer with colour-changing background, size-changing numbers, and side-appearing submenus.

In operation, the TFT display shows small digits in automatic mode; larger and bolder numbers in normal mode; inverted colours, moved redline, and stark numbers in sport mode, along with a programmable redline warning colour change. The tachometer display also features an electric movable metal ring with layer acrylic plastic to create a 3D effect. The LFA further features a new driver and passenger seat-belt airbag design increases similar to the S-Class ESF safety concept car.

The steering wheel features a right-mounted start button and alloy paddle-shifters. To start the car, the driver must insert the key beside the steering wheel then press the start button. Two octaves of engine sound are channeled into the cabin via twin ducts which connect the firewall with the intake manifold, with the sound tuned in the manner of an Ovation guitar. A 12-speaker Mark Levinson sound system with compact lightweight components was also developed for the interior. Custom-made Tumi suitcases are designed for the LFA interior, with a two-piece set made from carbon-fibre style materials and inscribed with the VIN; a smaller "concourse" case is for track days and short trips, while a larger "coastal" case is for longer trips.

== Tokyo Motor Show Edition ==
At the 2011 Tokyo Motor show, a special edition of the LFA was released called the Tokyo Motor Show Edition. This edition has an exposed carbon fibre roof and carbon fibre rear spoiler. A total of 9 units have been produced.

== Nürburgring package ==
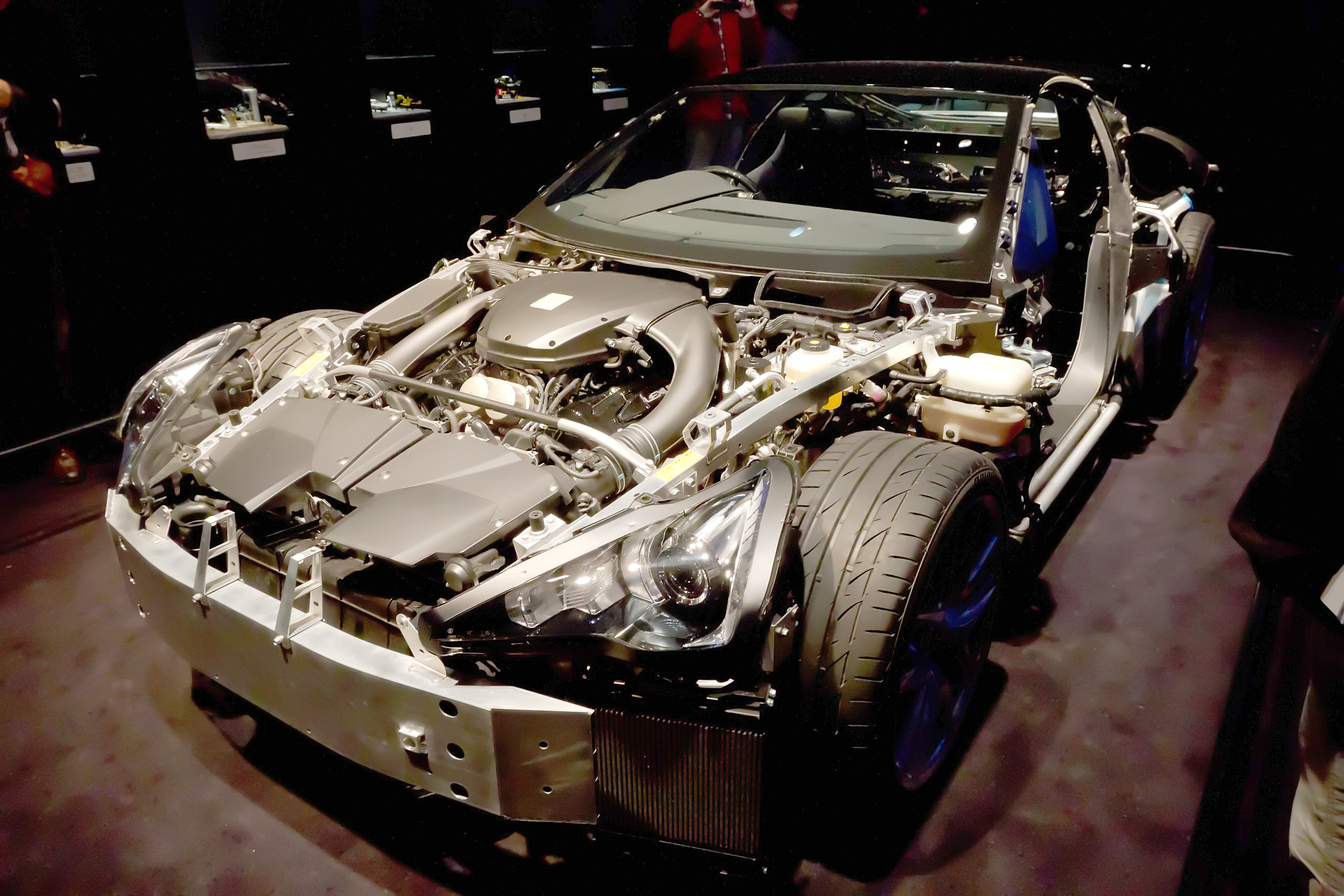
Chassis of the Nürburgring Edition LFA at the 2011 Tokyo Motor Show, with its V10 producing an added 7.4 kW (10 PS; 10 hp)

On 15 March 2010, Lexus detailed the circuit-tuned variant of the LFA, plans for which were first disclosed at the LFA official press launch the previous October. The variant is officially known as the LFA Nürburgring Package in reference to the similar setup employed on the LFA race cars at the 24 Hours Nürburgring.

The package features an extra 7.4 kW (10 PS; 10 hp) from its V10 engine, bringing the total to 420 kW (571 PS; 563 hp). It also features a re-calibrated transmission with gear shifts made faster by 0.05 seconds, a front splitter, stiffer and more adjustable suspension, lightweight magnesium wheels by BBS wrapped in high performance street tyres, aerodynamic canards at the sides of the front bumper, and a large fixed rear wing, which increases downforce by 33% over the standard car.

The LFA with the Nürburgring Package is a competition-focused variant and was available in four exterior colours, namely glossy black, matte black, race yellow, and whitest white. The production totals are to be included in the 500-unit total LFA planned build cycle, and although Lexus stated it would be limited to a 50-unit run, a total of 64 were produced. Buyers received training sessions at the Nordschleife, accompanied by Nürburgring chief instructors, a one-night stay at the Lindner Congress and Motorsport Hotel Nürburgring, admission to the ring°werk leisure park, a Nürburgring branded jacket, and a one-year pass to the circuit.

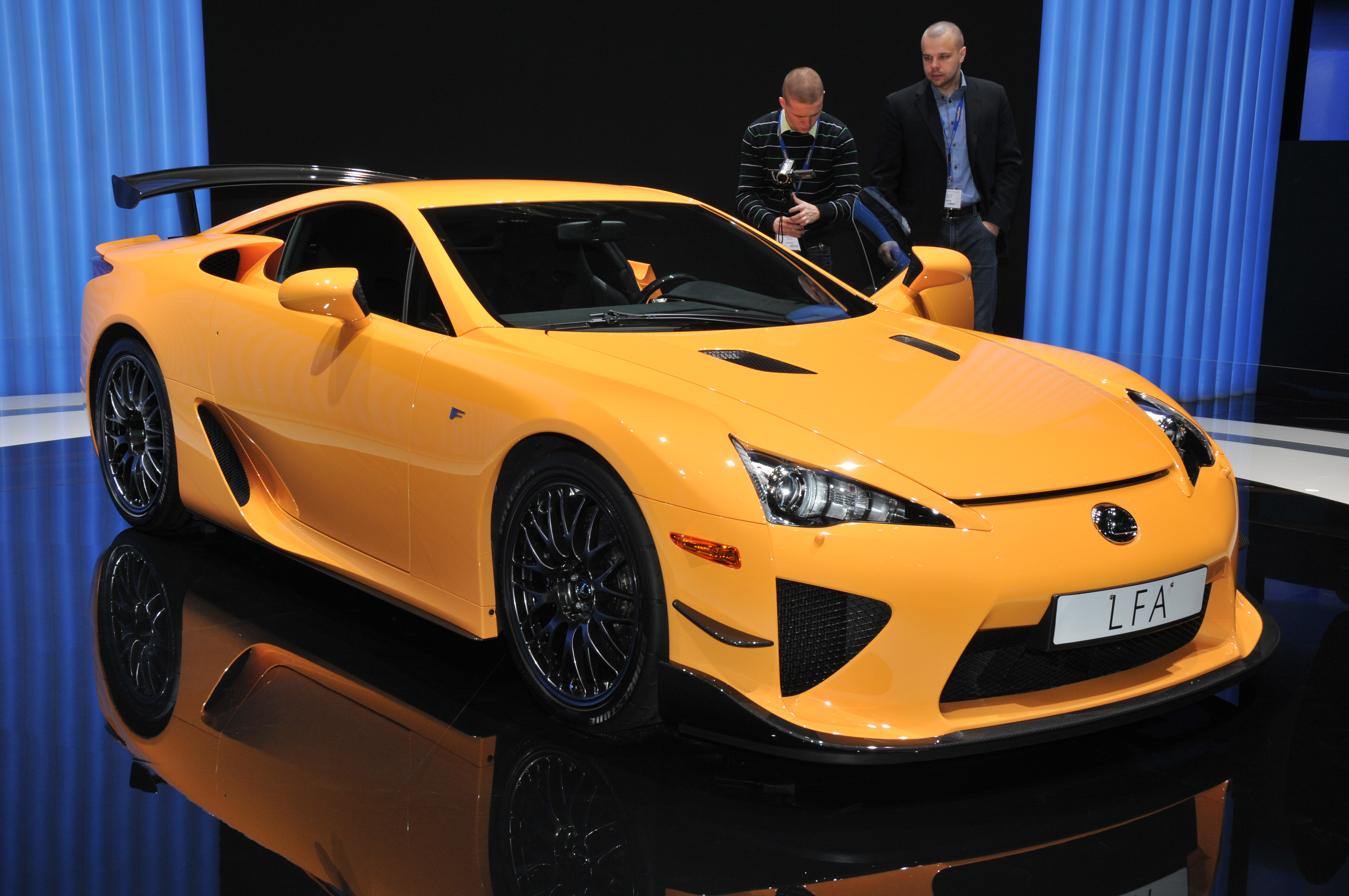
The Nürburgring Edition Lexus LFA, shown here at the 2011 Geneva Motor Show, is based on the VLN racing model

The Nürburgring Package LFA was tested at the Nürburgring in June 2011. Driven by Akira Iida, the LFA set a time of 7:22.85 (video confirmed), the 7th-fastest time ever for a road-legal production vehicle. Lexus confirmed that this lap video was recorded as a "warm-up" video for the "ADAC 24-hours" for exhibition purposes. The LFA hit 292 km/h (181 mph) on the last straight uphill climb, which is one of the highest speeds achieved by factory standard sports car on that segment of the track. Standard OEM Bridgestone Potenza RE70 performance street tyres were used.

On 2 September 2011, reports came from Lexus via Twitter as well as Chris Harris of Evo Magazine that the Lexus LFA Nürburgring Package completed a lap of the Nürburgring in 7:14.64 with a top speed of 298 km/h (185 mph) on the "Döttinger" uphill climb, making it the fastest road-legal production vehicle to lap the racetrack at the time. A few days later, the time was confirmed by Lexus as 7:14.64 and a video was provided. OEM Bridgestone Potenza RE070 street tyres had been used to set the record.

== Specifications ==
=== Manufacturer ===
Official specifications and performance figures for the Lexus LFA are as follows:

Engine type	1LR-GUE 72° Even firing V10	Valvetrain	DOHC 4-valves/cylinder, dual VVT-i
Displacement	4,805 cc (293.2 cu in)	Bore x Stroke	88 mm × 79 mm (3.5 in × 3.1 in)
Compression Ratio	12.0:1	Redline	9000 rpm (rev limiter 9500 rpm)
Transmission	6-speed ASG	Minimum shift times	200 ms or 150 ms
Power	552 hp (412 kW) at 8700 rpm	Torque	480 N⋅m (354 ft⋅lbf) at 6800 rpm
Curb weight	1,480 kg (3,263 lb)	Power-to-Weight	0.28 kW/kg (0.17 hp/lb)
Weight distribution	49.8:50.2 (front:rear)	Top speed	326 km/h (203 mph)
0-97 km/h (60 mph)	3.6 sec. (official, w/o launch control)	0-100 km/h (62 mph)	3.7 sec.

=== Performance ===
Tested performance specifications for the Lexus LFA from Car and Driver^{†}, Motor Trend^{‡}, Road & Track^{††} and Insideline^{†††} are as follows:

0-97 km/h (60 mph)	3.6 secs (w/ launch control.)^{†}	0-201 km/h (125 mph)	11.4 sec.
0-160 km/h (100 mph)	7.6 sec.^{†}	0-210 km/h (130 mph)	12.7 sec.^{†}
0-180 km/h (110 mph)	9.2 sec.^{†}	0-241 km/h (150 mph)	18.3 sec.^{†}
0-193 km/h (120 mph)	10.8 sec.^{†}	0-261 km/h (162 mph)	21.2 sec.
400 m (1/4 mi)	11.6 sec. ^{†††}(at 201 km/h (125 mph))^{†}	Slalom	121.0 km/h (75.2 mph)^{†††}
Lateral acceleration	1.00 G (61 m (200 ft) skidpad)^{†}; 1.05 G^{‡}	Braking (113–0 km/h (70–0 mph))	48 m (156 ft)^{†}

Edmunds' Insideline managed to acquire an LFA from Lexus for one week and tested the LFA on the track including an impromptu grudge match on the drag strip. Both cars won 2 races each making it a draw.

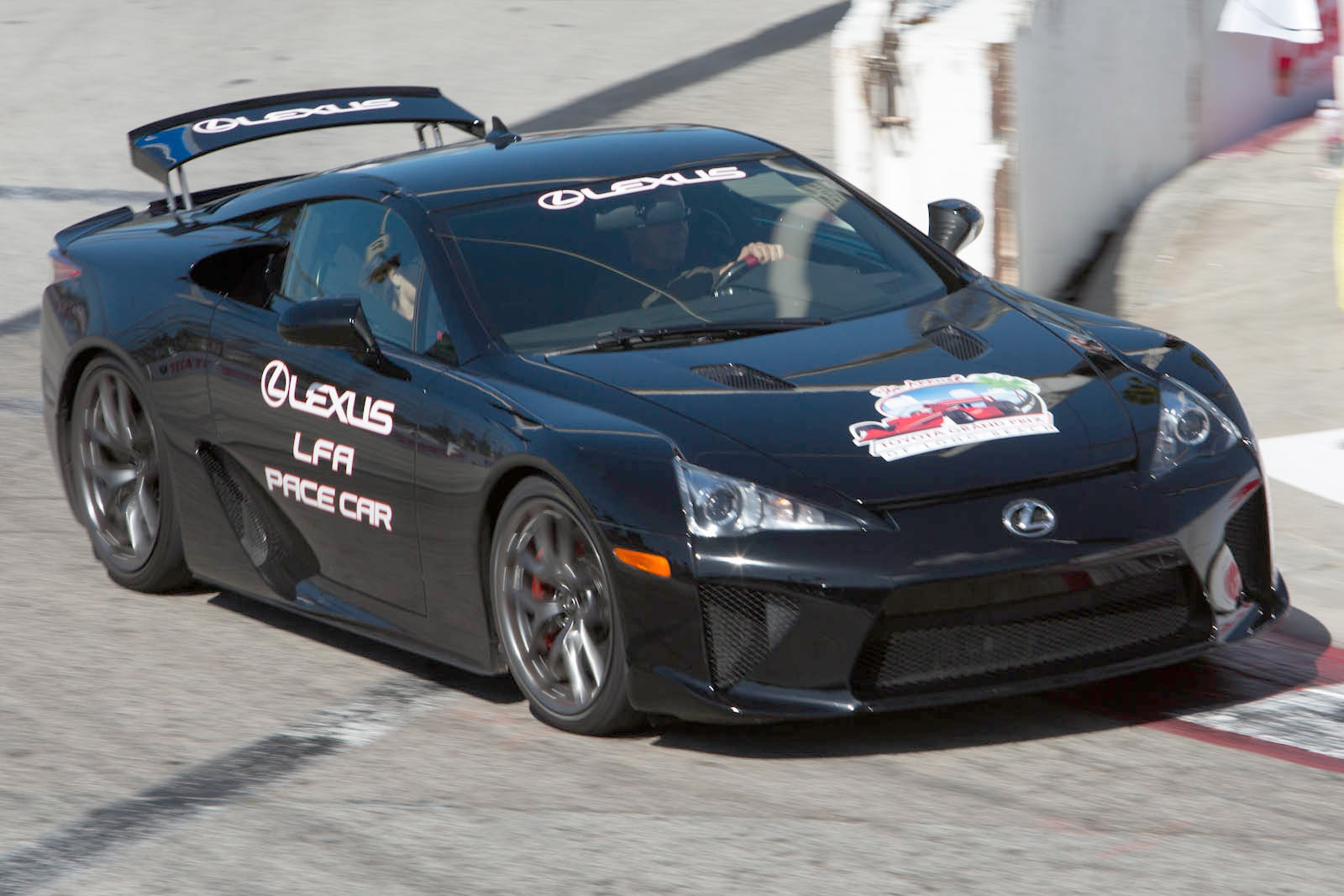
Lexus LFA pace car at the 2012 Grand Prix of Long Beach

Insideline recorded a 0–97 km/h (0–60 mph) in 3.9 seconds without launch control system and achieved the 1/4-mile 11.6 seconds at 200 km/h (124 mph). Lexus LFA circled the skidpad in 1.02 g and achieved one of the highest slalom speeds ever recorded at 121.0 km/h (75.2 mph). Insideline also managed to do 3 dyno runs on a dynojet dyno on the Lexus LFA, which resulted in LFA generating a power output of 383 kW (521 PS; 514 hp) to the wheels, which after factoring in RWD drivetrain loss turned out to be substantially higher than the 412 kW (560 PS; 553 hp) at the crank factory specification.

Car and Driver track-tested the LFA in November 2010 while conducting a comparison test. The test was conducted in Wales and returned a 0–97 km/h (0–60 mph) time of 3.6 seconds using the launch control system and a quarter-mile of 11.7 seconds at 201 km/h (125 mph). Motor Trend recorded a stopping distance from 97–0 km/h (60–0 mph) in less than 28.7 m (94 ft), and pulled 1.05 g on their skidpad. Road and Track tested the LFA at 119 km/h (74.2 mph) through the slalom and 1.04 g on the skidpad.

=== Lap times ===
==== Circuit de Nevers Magny-Cours ====
Motorsports France conducted a track test on the Lexus LFA and ran a hot lap around the Circuit de Nevers Magny-Cours resulting in a lap time of 1:20.6, which was the fastest ever recorded lap time on the race track despite the test having been conducted in 0 degree freezing temperatures. It was one of the very rare track tests where an actual LFA launch control system was used resulting in a very fast 0–260 km/h (162 mph) acceleration time of only 21.2 seconds.

==== Contidrom ====
Auto Zeitung Germany in the August 2010 edition conducted a comparison with the Lexus LFA. Around Contidrom race track in Hannover, Germany, the LFA turned a faster lap time by 1.8 seconds of 1:35.66 minutes. Although, the start sector car hit 204–208 km/h (127–129 mph), the LFA continuously hit higher speeds in the high speed sector, dynamic sector where agility and spontaneous reactions are measured eventually turning in faster lap. AutoZeitung raved about the LFA's handling, chassis control and race car-like reflexes and response.

==== El Toro ====
In the LFA's Top Gear USA appearance in the third quarter of 2011 in the "Beating Tanner" episode, the American Stig also did a hot lap around the Top Gear USA testing track in 1:22.6, located at Marine Corps Air Station El Toro, which is the third quickest lap time ever on the race track.

==== Nürburgring ====
Chief Engineer Haruhiko Tanahashi mentioned during the world's press at the Nürburgring in Germany that the LFA has lapped the Nürburgring Nordschleife in "better than 7 minutes 20 seconds", although no further specifics were given to the record lap.

Sport Auto in the September 2010 edition conducted an LFA supertest with a red LFA that had been used in several other tests in Europe and Horst Von Saurma conducted a hot lap of the LFA around the Nürburgring Nordschleife. The LFA clocked the Nürburgring in 7:38. The LFA was wearing temporary Bridgestone S001 street tyres since the LFA spec tyres are still under development. Although the LFA lap time is slower than the chief engineer's "better than 7:20" claim, Sport Auto cited LFA ran exactly the same lap time with the same driver as other major competitors. All tests were conducted by the same driver, Horst von Saurma.

Auto Bild Germany in the September edition of 2010 in part 1 of the comparison conducted a head-to-head Nürburgring Supercomparo (longer 20.8 km version of the track). Lexus LFA turned in the fastest Nurburgring lap time (7:38,85), The Nurburgring 20.8 km test driver Sascha Bert stated "LFA was built for the Nurburgring race track."

National Geographic's show, Megafactories, reported a 2011 test of the Lexus LFA Nürburgring package driven by Iida Akira that achieved a record time for production vehicles of 7 minutes 14 seconds.

==== Top Gear test track ====
The LFA appeared on Top Gear in January 2010, where its power lap of 1.22.8 was the quickest wet test lap ever recorded on the Top Gear test track located at Dunsfold Aerodrome in Surrey, United Kingdom.

==== Westover ====
Battle of the Supercars did a head-to-head comparison with the Lexus LFA, with Tanner Foust driving the LFA at the runways of Westover Air Reserve Base. LFA comprehensively was declared the winner by the presenter where LFA lapped the short 1-mile track with a lap time of 48.9 for the LFA, despite Tanner having difficulties launching the Lexus LFA in the 1-mile road course lap and also the standing mile drag race where LFA won despite a delayed launch (no launch control used for these runs). This test also saw LFA using launch control for the first time in the 0-100-0 mph test.

LFA failed to win the brake test. However, in the behind the scenes footage, it was shown the LFA's carbon brakes meant for hardcore track usage were not warmed up properly, which is essential for carbon brakes to perform at their best. In the successive run, LFA carbon brakes were consistently getting better braking shorter in every successive run. In every 0–161 km/h (0–100 mph) sprint shown in the behind the scenes footage, LFA out-launched and out-accelerated its rival vehicle. In the top speed, rolling start run on the 3.2 km (2 mi) runway, LFA hit a speed of 296.3 km/h (184.1 mph). Tanner Foust explained there was no way to retract the LFA wing spoiler (deploys automatically at 80 km/h (50 mph)) at high speeds increasing drag substantially, which had cost him 6–10 km/h (4–6 mph).

== Reception ==
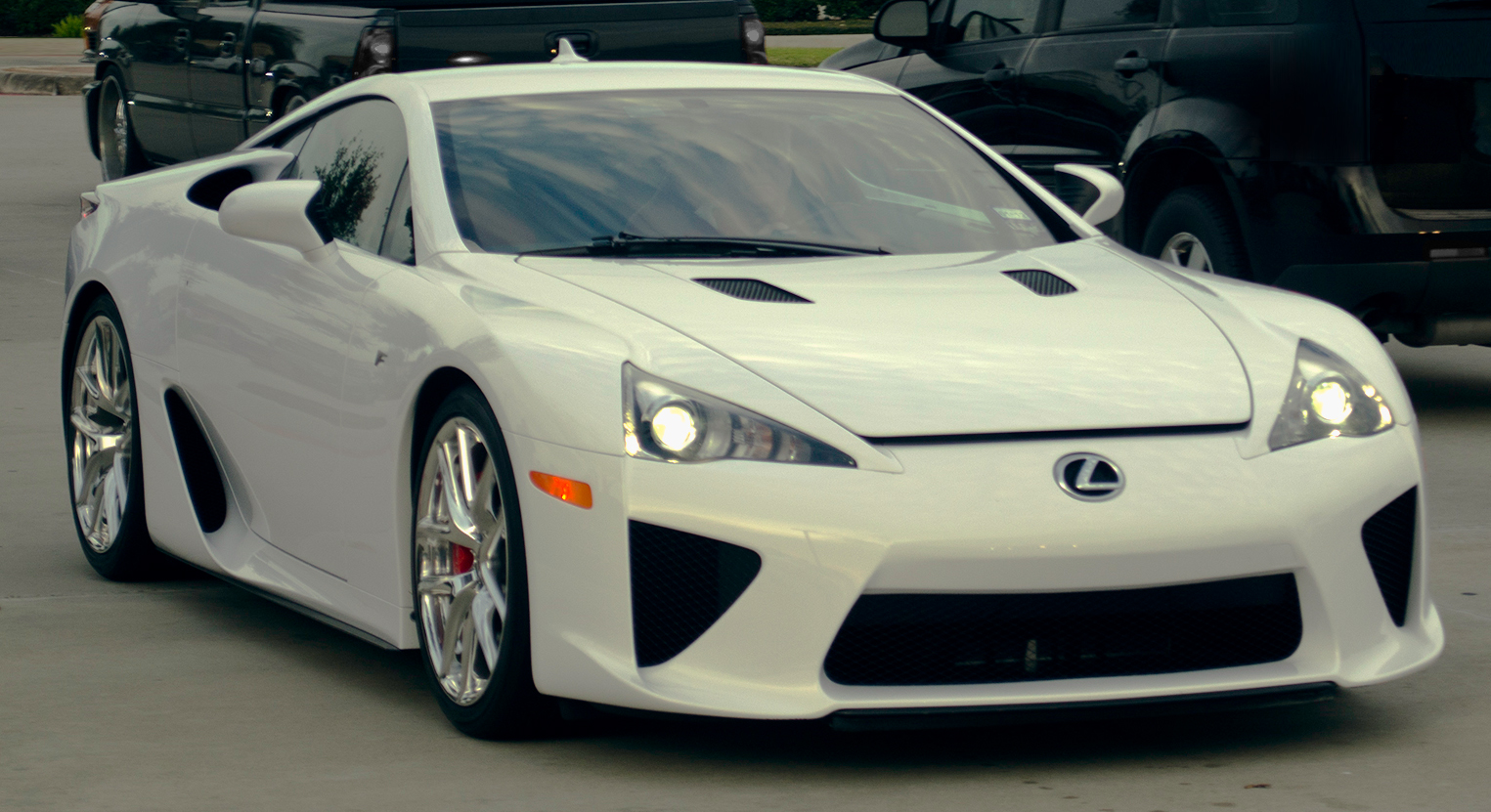
Production LFA model.

Car and Driver concluded in its review of the LFA that the sports car is "hugely expensive, hugely competent". The magazine felt that the car began to look like "something of a bargain" from the viewpoint that more expensive cars offered similar levels of technology and exclusivity. In their December 2010 issue, they placed it ahead of the Ferrari 599 HGTE in a one-on-one comparison test, with the verdicts "Lexus builds a Ferrari" and "Ferrari builds a Lexus".

In May 2010, Motor Trend ran the LFA through several track tests and praised its driving dynamics and engine note. However, in their 2011 Best Driver's Car competition, the LFA finished ninth out of eleven cars, receiving criticism for a "nervous, twitchy chassis" that gave the judges "no confidence". The car was also criticised for its transmission, ergonomics and ride quality. Top Gear criticised the LFA for being sold at a price much higher than comparable sports cars.

Autocar complimented the LFA's engine and handling on smooth surfaces, but criticised the car's behaviour on normal roads, where they felt that "the difficulty the LFA has in coping with an uneven road" negatively impacts driving enjoyment. Pointing out that rivals such as the Ferrari 458 Italia offer "more consistent all-conditions dynamics", the magazine gave the verdict that the LFA is "an occasional car, even by supercar standards".

GTspirit.com tested the LFA in Monaco in May 2010 and gave it a positive review with quotes such as "The LFA is incredibly easy to drive. It communicates well, has a superb overall balance and the transparency of the options is an eye-opener. The choice between the racing setup and an all-day trip through a dense city is easily changed." and "the 'I want one' feeling grew considerably every single minute."

Many reviewers have placed Lexus LFA near the top of the cars they have ever driven. Chris Harris of Evo UK had called LFA as the "best car I have ever driven around the Nurburgring. No other car inspires more confidence than the LFA". Autoweek Netherlands professional driver Sandor Van Ees stated "Lexus LFA - that sound, that experience. I place the Lexus LFA in the top 5 best cars I have ever driven". Dutch European journalist Thomas Bangma said, "this car is an absolute gem ... It is absolutely the best car I have ever driven". Car Magazine editor and professional test driver Ben Barry called the LFA Nurburgring edition "the Bugatti Veyron of Japan".

=== Television programs ===
The LFA appeared on Top Gear in January 2010, where Richard Hammond drove and raved about the car. Later in the episode, the LFA set a record for the quickest wet test lap ever recorded on the Top Gear test track, However, it was noted that the LFA cost 3 or more times than its rivals but was not faster than them; Jeremy Clarkson also noted that the 202 mph LFA costs 6 times more than the 193 mph Nissan GT-R, but is not 6 times faster. In response, Evo's review of the LFA pointed out that the performance of "a Bugatti Veyron is not 12 times more than the GT-R", with reviewer Chris Harris observing that no cars are 6 times more than a GT-R either. Jeremy Clarkson drove the LFA for the first time on Top Gear, describing it as "bloody brilliant". Later, in Series 19, Ep.2, Clarkson states at the start that the LFA is the best car he has ever driven and, in the end, quoted, "If I could have any car ever made given to me I'd pick a dark blue Lexus LFA." In Series 22, Episode 6, he states that he had expected to get a feeling like the LFA from the RC F sports coupé, but did not on the further comparison, concluding that the LFA was likely so perfect, not even Lexus themselves know how to remake it.

The LFA appeared on Fifth Gear with presenter Tiff Needell driving the car around the race track performing hot laps, powerslides, and power oversteers. Needell described in detail the high-tech engineering used in the car, and highly praised the 4.8-litre V10's power and sound. Tiff declared, "people who purchased the LFA would be very happy when they get their cars". At the conclusion of the review, he stated "for a weekend race track car, LFA is worth every penny".

In 2012, Jay Leno featured the LFA on his internet car enthusiast program Jay Leno's Garage, where he looked at several advanced features of the car including the carbon-fibre construction, interior details, and the engine. Leno praised the LFA for its engineering, attention to detail, and quality of construction all around. Leno took the car for a test drive in the California mountains and had raving impressions of the LFA driving dynamics, handling, chassis rigidity, and engine sound. Leno stated that the LFA was "one of the greatest supercars ever built and certainly the best supercar ever to have come out Japan". Leno was very impressed with the LFA's city driving abilities and noted it was a "docile car around town". Leno summarized the LFA by saying, "certainly, there might be cars out there that could individually do things better than the LFA. Maybe a bit quicker or handling a bit better. But, no other car I know of does everything so extremely well".

== Motorsport ==
=== 2008 ===
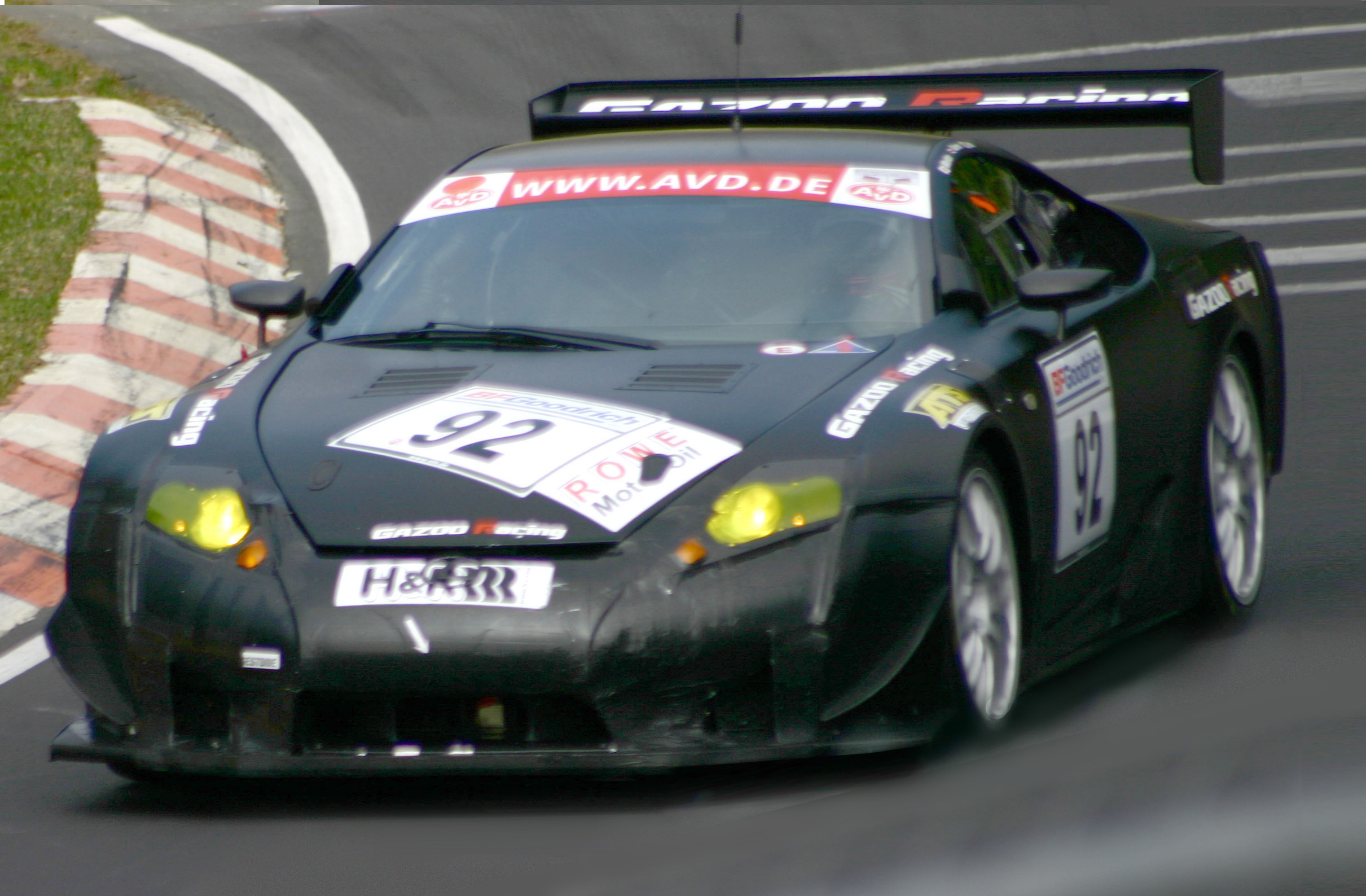
The Lexus LF-A prototype, No. 92 at the Nürburgring in 2008

A Lexus LF-A prototype was entered on 10 May 2008 on the Nürburgring 4-hour VLN endurance race. Despite being lapped 5 times and finishing 77th overall among over 200 teams, it surprisingly won the over 4,000 cc class SP8, as all other five class entrants, failed to finish. The best lap time of the Lexus, on the 24.4 km version used in VLN, was 9:06 in 3rd of 23 laps, on par with old Porsche 996 GT3 Cup (class Cup3A), while the fastest SP8 cars managed 8:20s.

Lexus also took part in the 24 Hours Nürburgring on 24/25 May 2008, with four Japanese drivers including Akira Iida leading the team. The LF-A was involved in a crash just prior to the race and was hurriedly repaired in two hours to make the race. As car #14, it qualified 27th among 223 cars, and finished 7th in the SP8 class of 11 entrants, and 121st overall, with a best lap average speed of 163 km/h (101 mph), compared to 175 km/h (109 mph) of the fastest cars.

=== 2009 ===
On 4 April 2009, an LF-A and a Lexus IS F entered by Gazoo Racing (which had already raced smaller cars in 2007 and 2008) finished first and second in the SP8 class in the ADAC-Westfalenfahrt VLN 4h endurance race, as all three other class entrants, failed to complete the race. In winning its second VLN 4h event, the LF-A improved its fastest lap time, with one driver completing 8:41 laps both in practice and in the race.

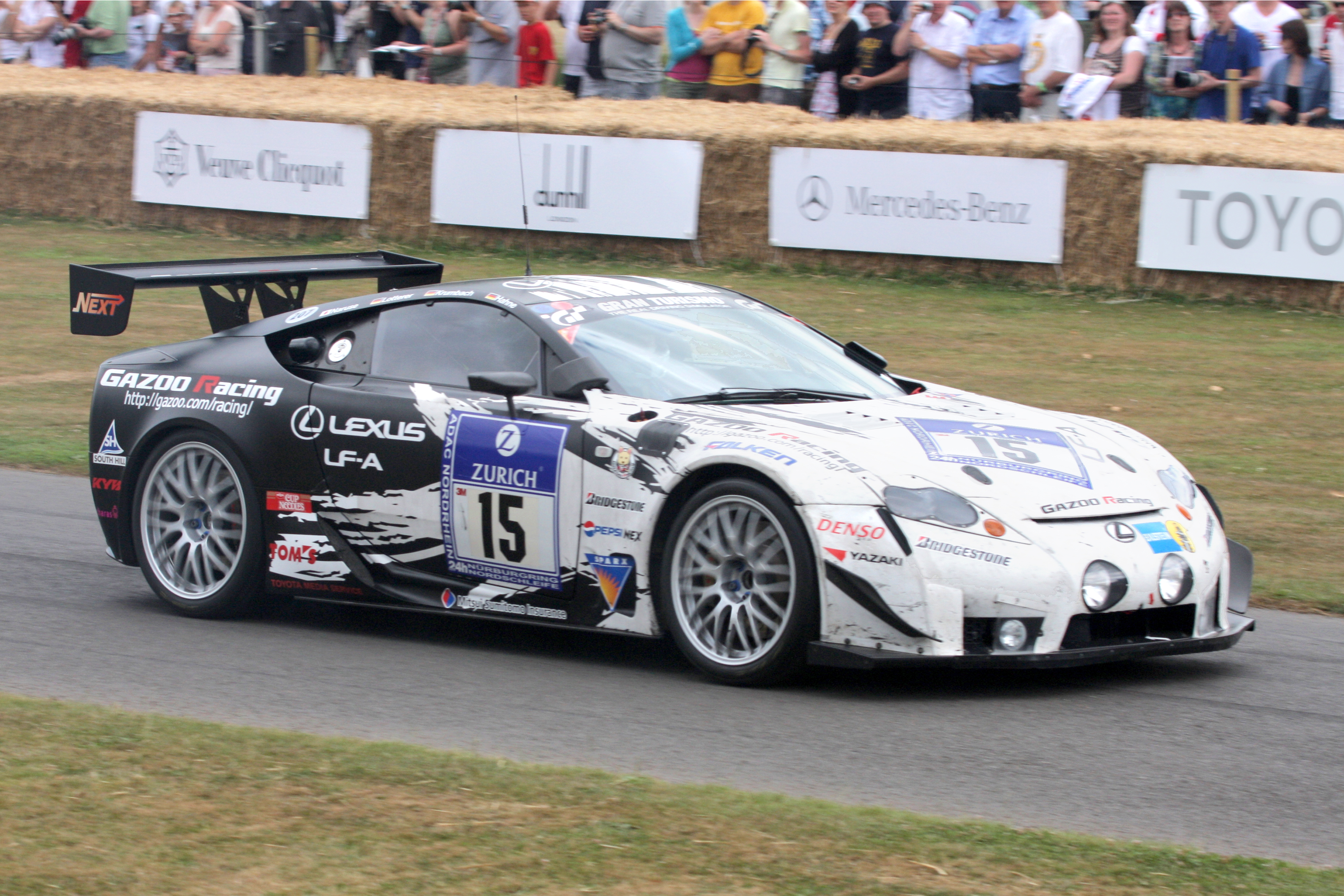
The 2009 24h Nürburgring race car No. 15 in Goodwood

The LF-A was subsequently entered into the 24 Hours Nürburgring race for the manufacturer stated purpose of obtaining feedback for fine-tuning production versions along with training of support technicians. Gazoo registered two LF-As and a single IS F in the SP8 class (4,000 cc to 6,200 cc), as the LF-A racecars were powered by a 4.8-litre (4,805 cc) V10 engine with a 9,000 rpm redline. At the 2009 24 Hours of Nürburgring endurance race held on 23/24 May, the No. 15 LF-A driven by Jochen Krumbach, Armin Hahne, André Lotterer, and Hiromu Naruse achieved sub-9 min laps and a best time of 8:50.458, which was the fastest time in the SP8 class, with a best lap speed of 172 km/h (107 mph);. The fastest times by the race leaders (SP9 class) were in the 8:40 range with a best lap speed of 176 km/h (109 mph). About 90 minutes from race completion, the No. 15 LF-A experienced a separated driveshaft and a fire which poured white smoke from the vehicle's rear section. The No. 14 LF-A completed the race and was ranked 4th in its class and 87th overall, behind the 3rd ranked No. 16 IS F During the early portions of the race the No. 14 LF-A recorded its peak position of 14th overall. One of the drivers of the No. 14 car was Toyota's new CEO Akio Toyoda, who also met Aston Martin's president and fellow race entrant Ulrich Bez at the race before deciding to build the Aston Martin Cygnet together.

=== 2010 ===
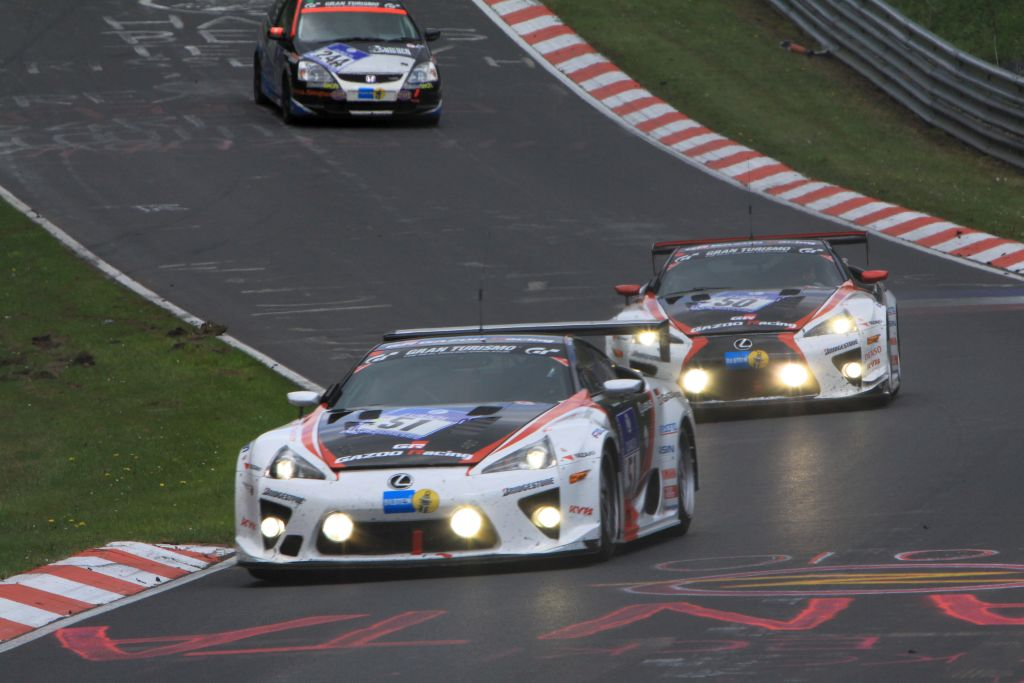
LFA race cars #51 and #50, SP8 class winner at the 2010 24h Nürburgring

Lexus/Gazoo again entered two cars in the 2010 24 Hours of Nürburgring, in the SP8 class over 4,000 cc. The "Balance of Performance" required a minimum weight of 1,500 kg (3,300 lb), a restrictor diameter of 34.2 mm, and a fuel tank size of 120 litres. The No. 50 car won its class, and finished 18th overall with 142 laps, 12 laps down. The No. 50 car, with 4 Japanese drivers, did a fastest lap of 8:55.934 (average of 170.470 km/h), which was over 20 seconds slower than the top 10 challengers, and slower than last year's performance.

Chief Test Driver/Engineer Hiromu Naruse, who coached the 2010 LFA race team, died in a tragic accident on 23 June 2010 while testing the Nürburgring Edition of the Lexus LFA on the roads local to the Nordschleife in Germany. According to police reports, the traffic accident occurred when his LFA Nürburgring Edition test prototype veered into oncoming traffic, colliding head-on with a BMW 3 series near the Nürburgring, at Boos. The BMW was also a test vehicle, and both occupants were injured, one severely; both were expected to survive. All three test drivers wore helmets, but Naruse was reportedly not wearing his seatbelt, and as his LFA test vehicle was a pre-production prototype, its safety features, including airbags, were not functional at the time.

== Sculpture models ==
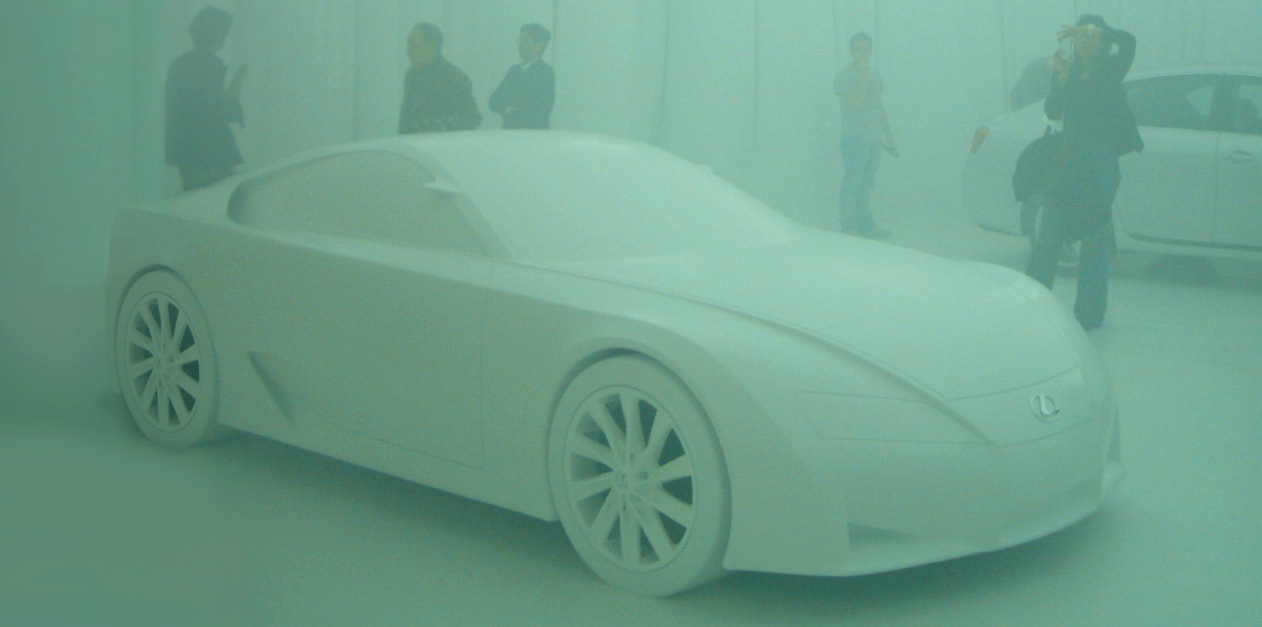
Lexus LF-A Salone Milano 2005 concept model at the Teatro dell'Arte in Milan

In April 2005, Lexus presented a sculptural model of the original LF-A concept at that year's Milan Design Week exhibition in Milan, Italy. Part of the marque's introductory display of its L-finesse design theme, the full-size LF-A model was presented next to a production Lexus GS model, in a design space produced by painter Hiroshi Senju, designer Junya Ishigami, and architect Kazuyo Sejima. The sculpted LF-A model followed the first introduction of the LF-A concept at the North American International Auto Show in January of that year. In contrast with the production GS sedan it shared the display space with, the LF-A model did not have interior access.

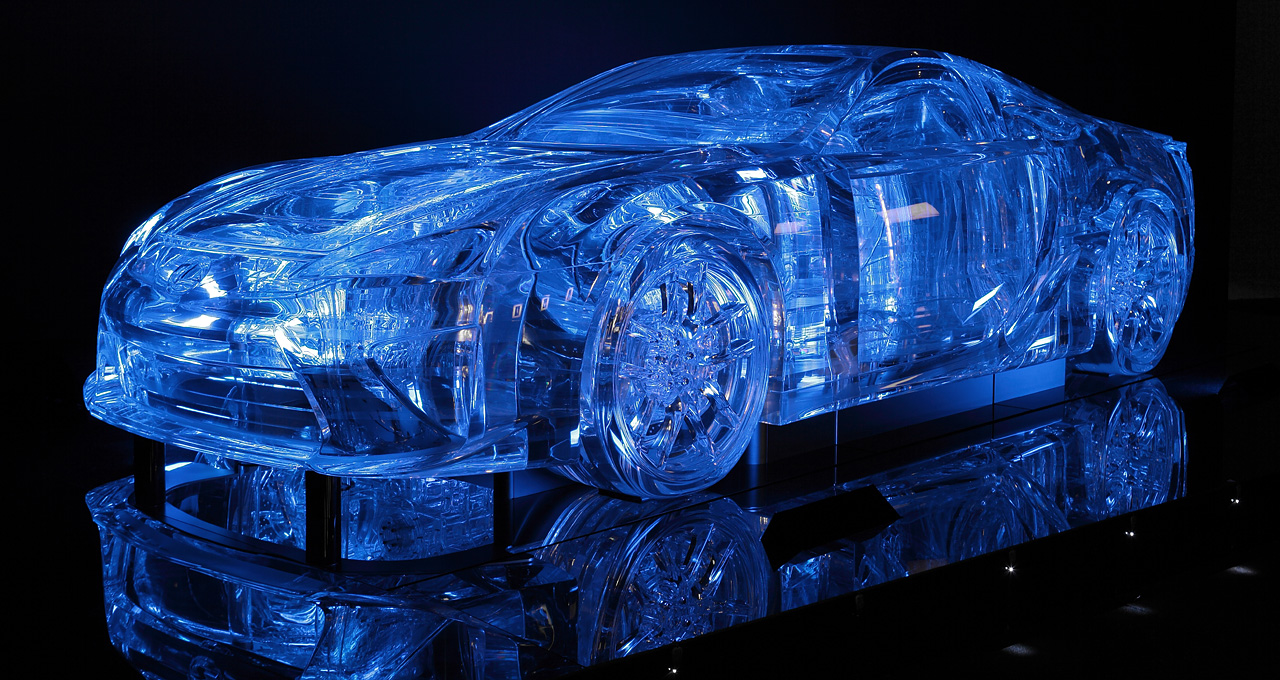
Lexus LFA Crystallised Wind at the 2009 Tokyo Motor Show.

In April 2009, Lexus presented an acrylic glass sculpture LFA model, called 'Crystallised Wind', at that year's Milan Design Week exhibition at the Museo Della Permanente art gallery in Milan. Commissioned in partnership with architect Sou Fujimoto, the full-sized LFA crystal sculpture had a transparent appearance, allowing viewers to see the engine, chassis, interior, and other internal components. Although closely resembling the 2007 coupe concept, design elements on the LFA Crystallised Wind model differed from previous iterations of the coupe, with five-spoke wheels, different headlamp shapes, and other separate details. The vehicle was presented along with a collection of accessories, gadgets, and styling products all produced from the same acrylic materials used in the Crystallised Wind model.

== Awards ==
In October 2009, the debut of the Lexus LFA was named among Road & Track's Best of the 2009 Tokyo Auto Show. For his role in leading its development project, Top Gear awarded Lexus LFA chief engineer Haruhiko Tanahashi as one of its Men of the Year for 2009. In April 2010, the LFA topped the Stiff Magazine list of the Top 5 V10 Road Cars. In its 2010 test of the LFA, Car gave the vehicle the magazine's maximum rating of five stars. The LFA was also named to the Top Gear 100 Sexiest Supercars of All Time list in 2010. Top Gear magazine in its September 2010 edition picked "5 greatest supercars of the year" and the LFA was honored as one of the greatest sports cars of the year. All 5 cars were featured in the magazine in a side-by-side comparison and LFA was picked as the "Stig's most favorite supercar".

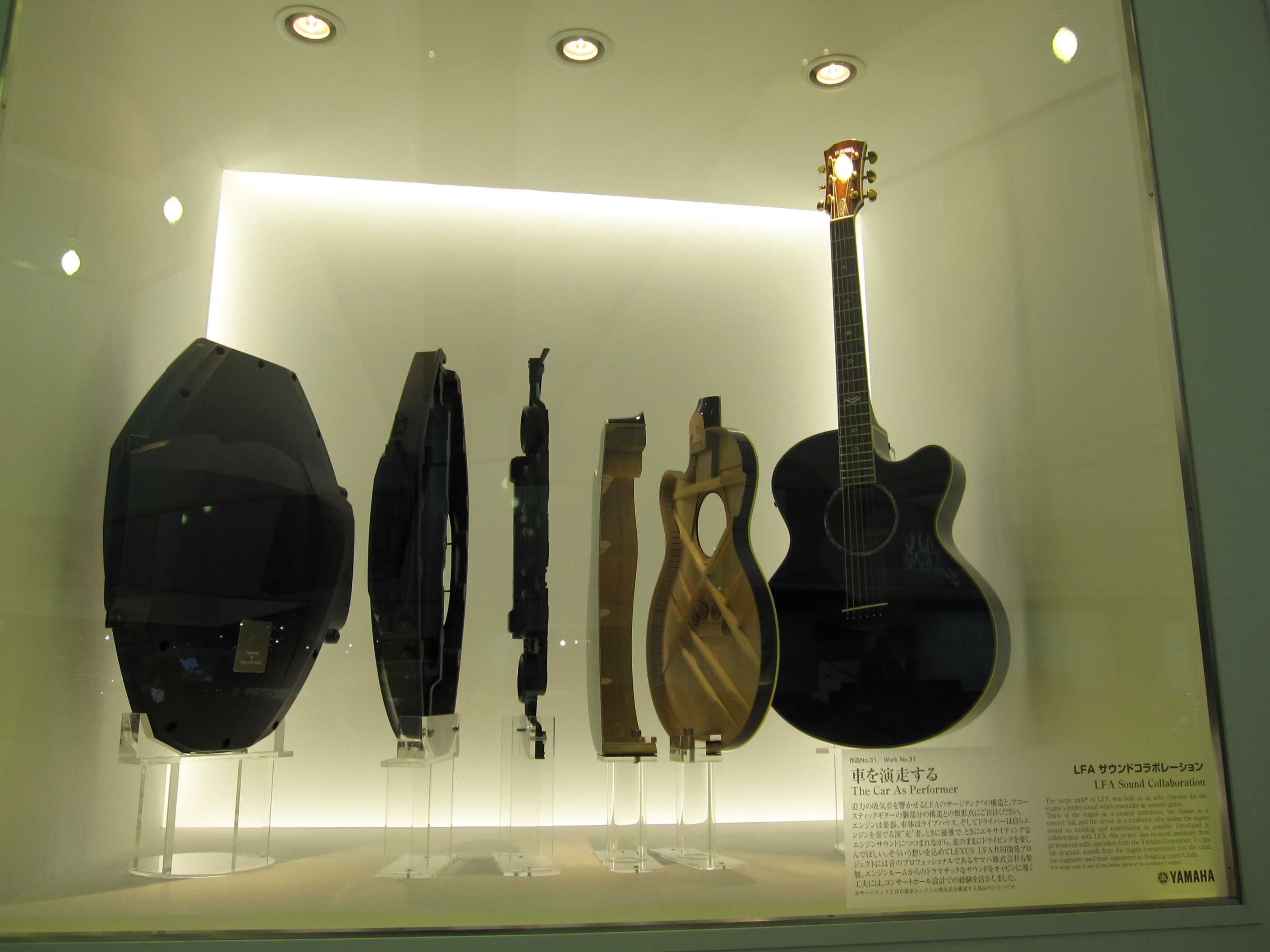
The LFA's surge tank was acoustically engineered by Yamaha.

Evo UK in its January 2011 edition held a "best engine of the year" selection. Lexus LFA's 4.8 litre V10 was selected as the "best engine of the year". Some of the comments regarding the Lexus LFA's V10 were "A mix of road and racing engines: Lexus LFA's utterly intoxicating 4.8 liter V10.", "There is the noise it makes, for a start, a dense shriek like a V10 F1 car's", "Then there's the wall of torque from 5,000 rpm to 9,000 rpm and a strong thrust even before that", "Lighter than an average V6 and it even meets the Euro 5 emission standards", "It is hard to imagine that such an engine's career will be over when all the LFAs are built, given the love that has gone into it. We certainly hope not".

Car Graphic magazine compiled a 'Best Cars of the Year 2011' in December 2011. It was based on all the cars that were tested during the year in their own respective months. The Lexus LFA won the 'Best Cars of the Year 2011' award. Lexus LFA was tested during the summer months in very wet conditions, but the track test even in the wet as well as daily city road driving warranted enough positive impressions for the magazine to award Lexus LFA the win. The Lexus LFA test numbers also reflect the implications of testing in the wet conditions. In February 2012, Singapore Car Mart awarded Lexus with "Best Car of the Year 2011" award for their LFA sports car.

The LF-A Roadster concept received an iF product design award from the International Forum Design organization in 2008, and the first LF-A concept was a recipient of an IDEA award from the Industrial Designers Society of America in the Design Explorations category of 2005's International Design Excellence Awards. The LFA was also a finalist in the 2009 Car Design of the Year and the Festival Automobile International's "most beautiful supercar of the year" awards.

== Sales ==
Calendar year	Canada	US
2011	0	62
2012	4	52
2013	1	23
2014	1	17
2015	0	9
2016	0	6
2017	0	3
2018	0	2
2019	0	3
2020	0	3

As of September 2020, 38 LFAs have been sold in Europe.

As of 2020, Lexus still had four unsold LFAs after selling three LFAs in 2019. However, two were sold in March 2020 and another in September 2020.

In June 2023, an Australian Toyota dealer purchased the final LFA, its own display car, more than a decade after production ended. The "sale" circumvented new Australian vehicle standards that would have otherwise made the LFA unregistrable after July 2023. As of 2023, the vehicle remains unused and undelivered.

== Nameplate use for other models ==
=== LFA Concept (2025) ===
The LFA nameplate was reused for a battery electric concept sports car shown in December 2025, which is a renamed Sport Concept shown in August 2025.

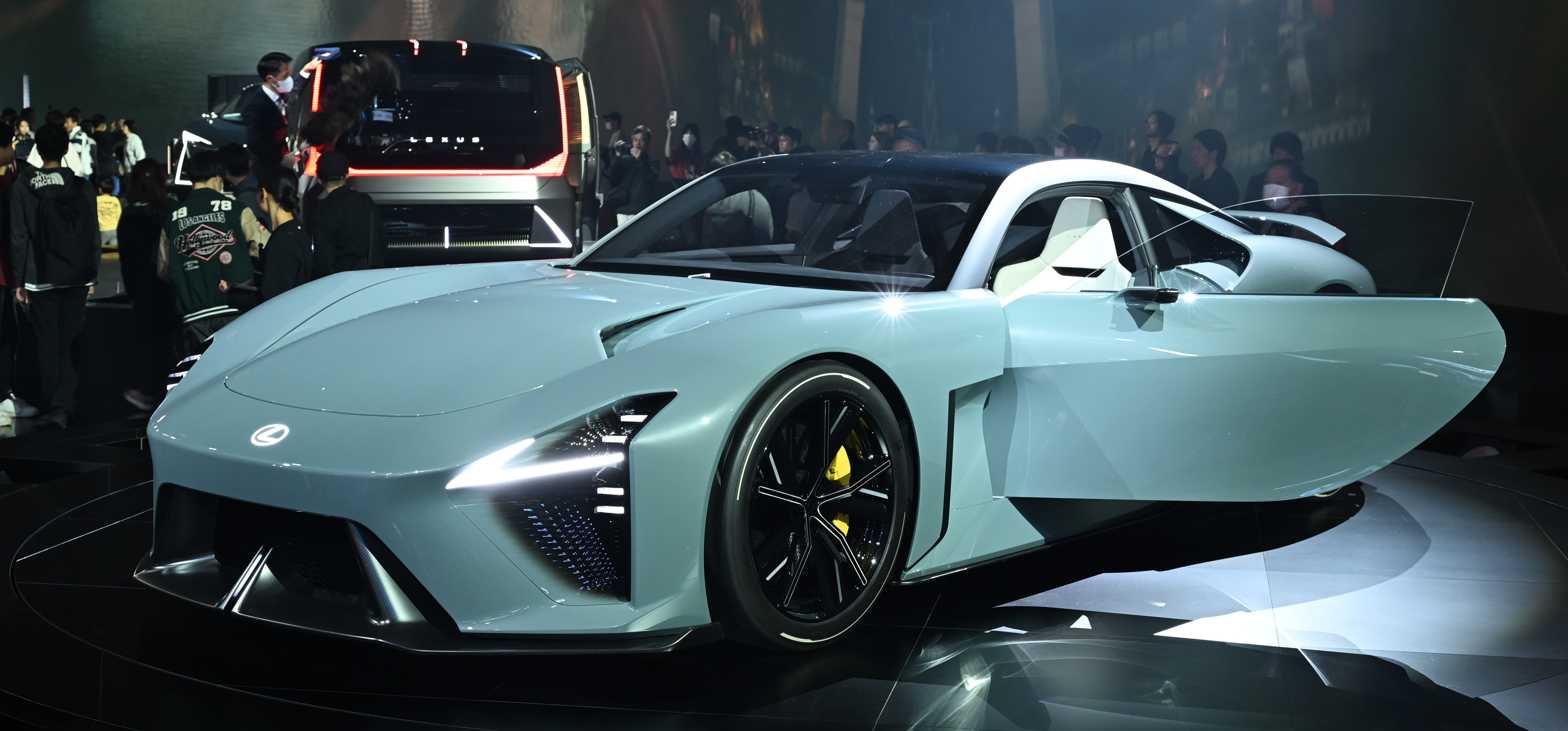
Sport Concept, later renamed as LFA Concept

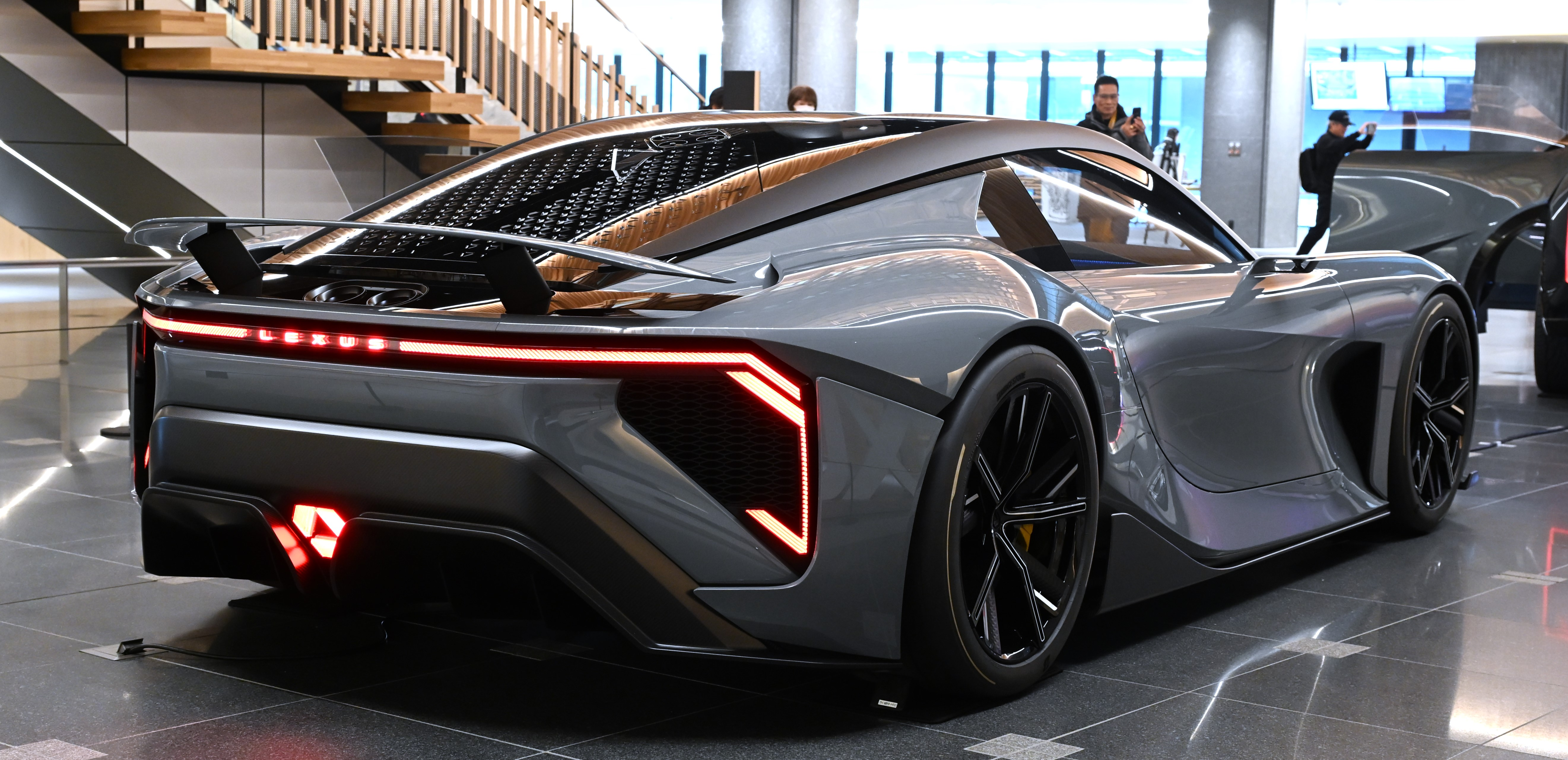
LFA Concept rear view

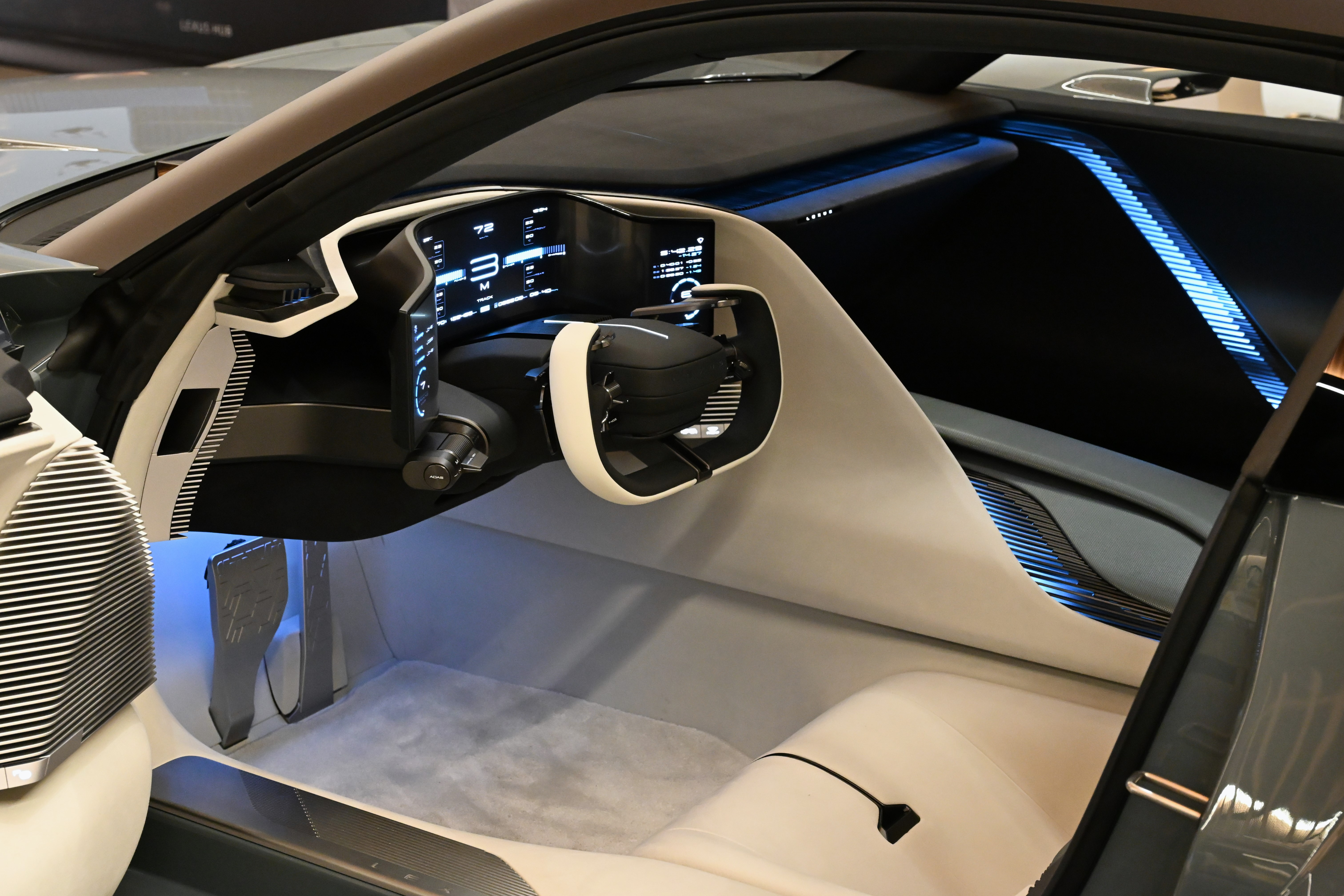
Interior (LFA Concept)
