= 2011 24 Hours of Nürburgring =

Endurance motor race in Germany

2011 ADAC 24 Hours of Nürburgring

Seasons
- ← 2010 2012 →

Nürburgring 24h track (Nordschleife+GP Circuit without Mercedes-Arena)

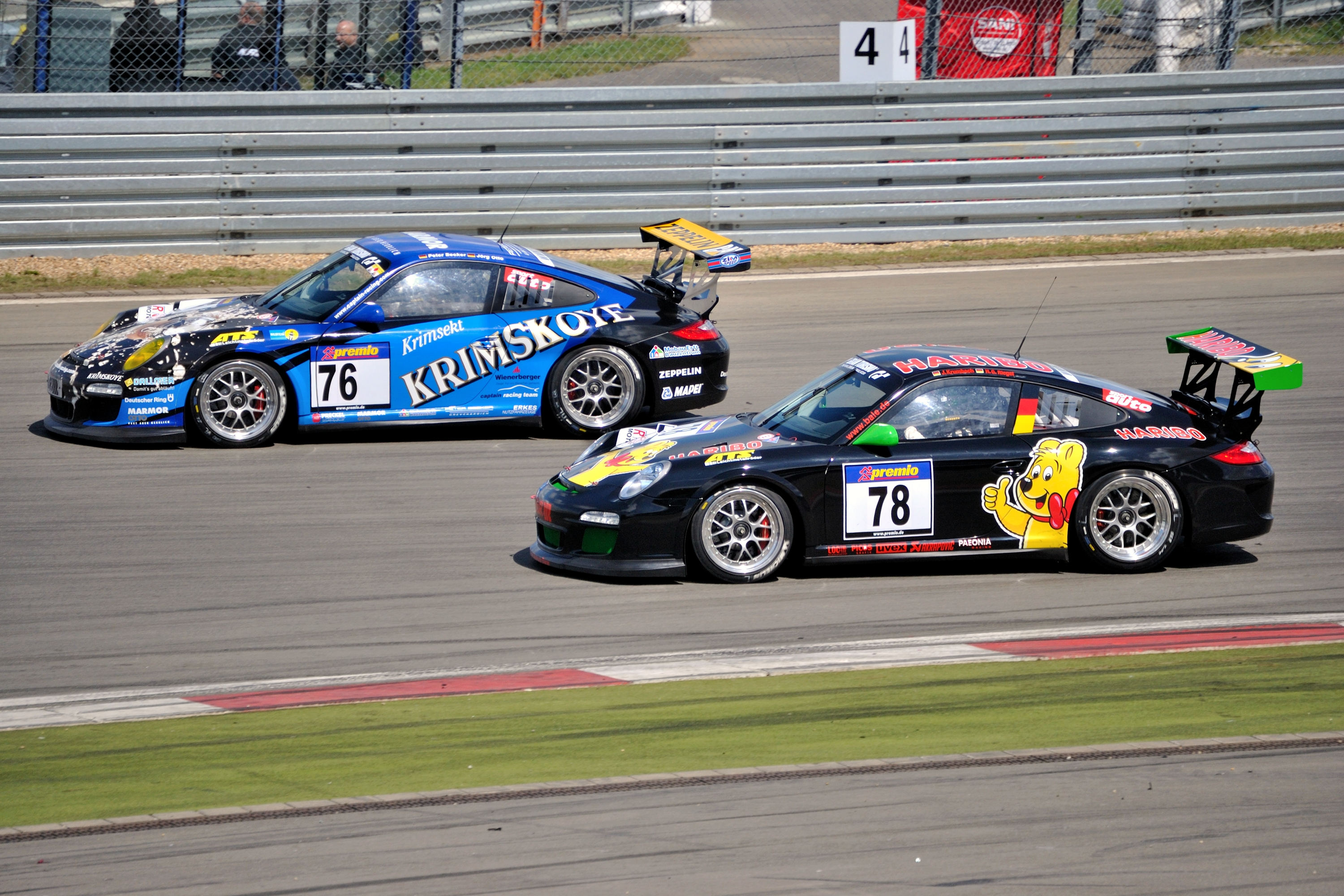
Two Porsche 911 at the 2011 Nürburgring 24 Hours

The 2011 ADAC Zurich 24 Hours of Nürburgring was the 39th running of the 24 Hours of Nürburgring. It took place over June 25–26, 2011. 135 out of the 202 starters were classified.

== Resume ==
With Corpus Christi weekend being rather late in 2011 on June 23–26, the 2011 event was held two weeks after the 2011 24 Hours of Le Mans. The first five VLN races of 2011 were won by a factory-entered BMW, a GT3-class Mercedes SLS, a new Ferrari 458, the Hybrid Porsche GT3 and finally an Audi R8 LMS, so at least these five different brands were expected to challenge for the overall win in the 24 hours. In the first qualifying session, the Hankook sponsored Farnbacher-Ferrari used soft tyres and was about 7 seconds faster than the competitors, lapping at an average speed of over 181 km/h, the fastest since 1983. This earned the team the pole position, but also an extra weight of 25 kg in the pre-race update of the ‘Balance of Performance’. Team Manthey decided to find out in the early stages of the race which class was more effective under the current conditions, entering their four Porsche factory drivers on two yellow and green Porsche 997 GT3: two pilots shared the #11 SP9/GT3-spec ‘R’, which had more power and qualified 8th, two others, the #18 SP7/GT2-class ‘RSR’, which had more downforce, but was only 16th on the grid. After a few hours in changing weather conditions, the team retired the ‘R’ to focus on the ‘RSR’ which already had won three times since 2007. Without any problems, it went on to win its fourth Nürburgring 24 Hours, with a new distance record of 156 laps. Second place was taken by another GT2-spec car, the #1 factory BMW M3 GT which had won in 2010. Five GT3 cars of Audi and Mercedes followed. The SP8/GT2-class #2 Ferrari had run into early problems, but set the fastest race lap in the final hours, finishing 8th and James Glickenhaus’ P4/5 Competizione finished 39th, second in the E1-XP2. After 2010 Sorg Rennsport took the victory in class SP4 again. Gianvito Rossi, Diego Romanini, Alfredo Varini and Alexander Rappold have been the only team in that class, but as it has been the first 24h race for Rossi and Rappold the 122 laps they did and final 78th place overall have been great result!

== Race results ==
Class winners in bold.

39th ADAC Zurich 24h-Rennen
Pos	Class	No	Team	Drivers	Vehicle	Laps
1	**SP7**	**18**	**(Germany) Manthey Racing**	**(Germany) Marc Lieb (Germany) Lucas Luhr (Germany) Timo Bernhard (France) Romain Dumas**	**Porsche 997 GT3-RSR**	**156**
2	**E1-XP2**	**1**	**(Germany) BMW Motorsport**	**(Germany) Jörg Müller (Brazil) Augusto Farfus (Germany) Uwe Alzen (Portugal) Pedro Lamy**	**BMW M3 GT**	**156**
3	**SP9 GT3**	**14**	**(Germany) Audi Sport Team Phoenix**	**(Germany) Marc Basseng (Switzerland) Marcel Fässler (Germany) Mike Rockenfeller (Germany) Frank Stippler**	**Audi R8 LMS**	**155**
4	SP9 GT3	15	(Germany) Audi Sport Team Phoenix	(Germany) Frank Stippler (Germany) Marc Hennerici (Germany) Christopher Haase (Germany) Markus Winkelhock	Audi R8 LMS	155
5	SP9 GT3	16	(Germany) Audi Sport Team Abt Sportsline	(Sweden) Mattias Ekström (Germany) Timo Scheider (Germany) Marco Werner (Germany) Christian Abt	Audi R8 LMS	154
6	SP9 GT3	22	(Germany) Black Falcon	(Germany) Kenneth Heyer (Germany) Thomas Jäger (Netherlands) Jeroen Bleekemolen (Germany) Jan Seyffarth	Mercedes-Benz SLS AMG GT3	153
7	SP9 GT3	32	(Germany) Heico Motorsport	(Germany) Lance David Arnold (Germany) Alexander Margaritis (Germany) Christopher Brück (Netherlands) Christiaan Frankenhout	Mercedes-Benz SLS AMG GT3	153
8	**SP8**	**2**	**(Germany) Hankook Team Farnbacher**	**(Germany) Dominik Farnbacher (Denmark) Allan Simonsen (Germany) Marco Seefried (Brazil) Jaime Melo**	**Ferrari 458 Italia GT**	**152**
9	SP9 GT3	26	(Germany) Sponsorcard: MSC Adenau e.V.	(Germany) Klaus Abbelen (Germany) Sabine Schmitz (Germany) Tim Bergmeister (Germany) Niclas Kentenich	Porsche 997 GT3 R	152
10	SP7	12	(Germany) Wochenspiegel Team Manthey	(Germany) Georg Weiss (Germany) Oliver Kainz (Germany) Michael Jacobs (Germany) Jochen Krumbach	Porsche 911 GT3 MR	151
11	SP9 GT3	21	(Germany) Black Falcon	(United Kingdom) Vimal Mehta (United Kingdom) Sean Patrick Breslin (United Kingdom) Sean Paul Breslin (Germany) Stephan Rösler	Mercedes-Benz SLS AMG GT3	150
12	SP9 GT3	17	(Germany) Audi Sport Team Abt Sportsline	(Germany) Luca Ludwig (Germany) Christopher Mies (Germany) Christer Jöns (Germany) Christian Abt	Audi R8 LMS	149
13	SP9 GT3	8	(Germany) Haribo Team Manthey	(United Kingdom) Richard Westbrook (Germany) Christian Menzel (Germany) Mike Stursberg (Germany) Hans Guido Riegel	Porsche 911 GT3 R	149
14	**SP4T**	**125**	**(Germany) Raeder Motorsport**	**(Germany) Michael Ammermüller (Germany) Frank Biela (Germany) Jens Klingmann (Germany) Martin Tomczyk**	**Audi TT RS**	**148**
15	SP9 GT3	34	(Germany) Reiter Engineering	(Liechtenstein) Ferdinand Stuck (Liechtenstein) Johannes Stuck (Germany) Hans-Joachim Stuck (Germany) Dennis Rostek	Lamborghini Gallardo LP 600+	148
16	SP9 GT3	27	(Austria) Pinta Racing	(Germany) Michael Illbruck (Germany) Manuel Lauck (Germany) Jörg van Ommen (Germany) Altfrid Heger	Porsche GT3 R	145
17	SP9 GT3	46	(Germany) Rowe Racing	(Germany) Michael Zehe (Germany) Dominik Schwager (Germany) Klaus Rader (United States) Mark Bullitt	Mercedes-Benz SLS AMG GT3	145
18	SP9 GT3	28	(Hong Kong) Audi race experience	(Germany) Frank Schmickler (Germany) Christian Bollrath (United Kingdom) John Barker (Colombia) Andres Torres	Audi R8 LMS GT3	145
19	SP7	55	(Germany) Scuderia Offenbach	(Germany) René Bourdeaux (Ukraine) Oleksiy Kikireshko (Germany) Rodney Forbes (Luxembourg) Antoine Feidt	Porsche 997 Cup	145
20	SP7	56	(United Kingdom) Team Parker Racing	(United Kingdom) Chris Cooper (United Kingdom) Guy Spurr (United Kingdom) Chris Harris (United Kingdom) Barry Horne	Porsche GT3 Cup	143
21	**SP3T**	**155**	**(Japan) Subaru Tecnica International**	**(Japan) Toshihiro Yoshida (Japan) Kota Sasaki (Germany) Marcel Engels (Netherlands) Carlo van Dam**	**Subaru Impreza WRX**	**142**
22	SP9 GT3	10	(Germany) Manthey Racing	(Germany) Marc Gindorf (Germany) Wolfgang Kohler (New Zealand) Peter Scharmach (Germany) Philipp Wlazik	Porsche 911 GT3 R	142
23	SP8	82		(Germany) Tobias Guttroff (Germany) Yannick Fübrich (Germany) Joachim Kiesch (Germany) Daniel Keilwitz	Chevrolet Corvette C6 GT4	140
24	SP3T	133	(Germany) Raeder Motorsport	(Germany) Elmar Deegener (Germany) Jürgen Wohlfarth (Germany) Christoph Breuer (Germany) Wolfgang Haugg	Audi TT S	140
25	SP7	33	(Germany) 11er Ecke-Logwin-Cargraphic-Racing	(Germany) Peter König (Germany) Steffen Schlichenmeier (Germany) Kurt Ecke (Germany) Andreas Sczepansky	Porsche 911 GT3 Cup	140
26	**AT**	**117**	**(Germany) Volkswagen Motorsport**	**(Spain) Carlos Sainz (Qatar) Nasser Al-Attiyah (South Africa) Giniel de Villiers (Germany) Klaus Niedzwiedz**	**Volkswagen Scirocco GT24-CNG**	**139**
27	**E1-XP Hybrid**	**9**	**(Germany) Porsche Team Manthey**	**(Germany) Jörg Bergmeister (Austria) Richard Lietz (Germany) Marco Holzer (United States) Patrick Long**	**Porsche 911 GT3 R Hybrid**	**139**
28	SP3T	134	(Germany) Scuderia Colonia e.V. im ADAC	(Germany) Matthias Wasel (Germany) Thomas Wasel (Germany) Marcus Löhnert (Germany) Roman Löhnert	Audi TT S	137
29	**SP5**	**81**	**(Germany) Live-Strip.com Racing**	**(Germany) Fabian Plentz (Germany) Tobias Neuser (Germany) Thomas Kappeler (Germany) Rudi Seher**	**BMW 330i M**	**137**
30	**SP10 GT4**	**100**	**(Germany) Pole Promotion**	**(Germany) Dennis Rostek (Sweden) Andreas Simonsen (Austria) Stefan Landmann (Germany) Frank Kräling**	**BMW M3 GT4**	**137**
31	**V5**	**225**	**(Germany) Black Falcon Team TMD Friction**	**(Germany) Carsten Knechtges (Germany) Manuel Metzger (Germany) Tim Scheerbarth (Germany) Philipp Leisen**	**BMW Z4**	**135**
32	V5	234	(Germany) Team DMV	(Germany) Matthias Unger (Germany) Daniel Zils (Germany) Norbert Fischer (Germany) Timo Schupp	BMW Z4 3.0 Si	135
33	SP5	80	(Germany) Live-Strip.com Racing	(Germany) Frank Jelinski (Germany) Rudi Seher (Germany) Karlheinz Grüner (Germany) Jens Strack	BMW 330i M	135
34	SP3T	142	(Germany) Alpecin Schirra motoring	(Germany) Friedrich von Bohlen (Germany) Harald Grohs (Germany) Nils Bartels (Austria) Hari Proczyk	BMW Mini Cooper	134
35	SP10 GT4	67		(Germany) Torsten Kornmeyer (Germany) Dirk Kornmeyer (Germany) Hendrik Still	Ginetta G 50	134
36	**SP8T**	**71**	**(Germany) Schulze Motorsports**	**(Germany) Tobias Schulze (Germany) Michael Schulze (Japan) Yasuyoshi Yamamoto (Japan) Kazunori Yamauchi**	**Nissan GT-R**	**134**
37	SP7	60		(Germany) Klaus Werner (Germany) Jochen Hudelmaier (Italy) Sergio Negroni (Italy) Francesco Rizzi	Porsche 997 Cup	134
38	SP10 GT4	70	(Germany) Dörr Motorsport	(Germany) Stefan Kenntemich (Germany) Uwe Ebertz (Italy) Giampaolo Tenchini (Germany) Tom Robson	BMW M3 GT4	133
39	E1-XP2	23	(United States) Scuderia Cameron Glickenhaus	(Finland) Mika Salo (Italy) Luca Cappellari (Italy) Nicola Larini (Italy) Fabrizio Giovanardi	N.Technology P4/5 Competizione	133
40	SP10 GT4	89	(Germany) Sponsorcard: Bonk Motorsport	(Germany) Henry Walkenhorst (Germany) Jens Moetefindt (Germany) Christian Moers (United States) Greg Ross	BMW M3 GT4	133
41	SP8	88	(Japan) Gazoo Racing	(Japan) Akira Iida (Japan) Hiroaki Ishiura (Japan) Kazuya Oshima	Lexus LF-A	133
42	V5	230		(Germany) Werner Gusenbauer (Germany) Andreas Herwerth (Austria) Erich Trinkl (Germany) Rainer Kathan	BMW Z4	132
43	V5	226	(Germany) Black Falcon Team TMD Friction	(Germany) Hans Dampf (Switzerland) Christian Raubach (Germany) Jürgen Dienstühler (Luxembourg) Steve Jans	BMW E92	132
44	**SP3**	**170**	**(Switzerland) Team ATS Motorsport**	**(Switzerland) Ralf Schmid (Switzerland) Harald Jacksties (Germany) Frank Lorenzo (Germany) Friedhelm Mihm**	**Honda S 2000**	**132**
45	SP7	45	(Germany) Race & Event	(Germany) Dr. Johannes Kirchhoff (Germany) Dr. Wolfgang Kemper (Germany) Gustav Edelhoff (Germany) Elmar Grimm	Porsche GT3 RS	132
46	AT	116	(Germany) Volkswagen Motorsport	(Germany) Klaus Niedzwiedz (Belgium) Vanina Ickx (Switzerland) Peter Wyss (Germany) Bernd Ostmann	Volkswagen Scirocco GT24-CNG	132
47	SP7	51	(Germany) Kremer Racing	(Germany) Eberhard Baunach (Germany) Michael Küke (Germany) Edgar Salewsky (Germany) Martin Kalandrik	Porsche 911 Cup	132
48	SP9 GT3	44	(Japan) Falken Motorsports	(Germany) Wolf Henzler (United Kingdom) Peter Dumbreck (Austria) Martin Ragginger (Germany) Sebastian Asch	Porsche 997 GT3 R	132
49	SP9 GT3	20	(Germany) Black Falcon	(Ukraine) Andrii Lebed (Germany) Hannes Plesse (Germany) Maik Rosenberg (Germany) Ralf Schall	Mercedes-Benz SLS AMG GT3	131
50	SP4T	124	(Germany) Heico Sportiv GmbH Co. KG	(Germany) Patrick Brenndörfer (Germany) Martin Müller (Germany) Frank Eickholt (Germany) Ulli Andree	Volvo C30 T5	131
51	SP7	52	(Germany) Kremer Racing	(Germany) Wolfgang Kaufmann (Germany) Dirk Lessmeister (Germany) Adam Osieka (Germany) Daniel Schrey	Porsche 997 GT3 Cup	131
52	**V6**	**222**		**(Switzerland) Benedikt Frei (Switzerland) Stefan Abegg (Italy) Rudolfo Funaro**	**BMW M3 CSL**	**131**
53	SP5	109		(Austria) Richard Purtscher (Austria) Constantin Kletzer (Austria) Johannes Huber (Germany) Ingo Tepel	BMW M3	130
54	**D1T**	**201**	**(France) Team Peugeot RCZ Nokia**	**(Germany) Michael Bohrer (France) Stephane Caillet (Germany) Jürgen Nett (France) Alexandre Prémat**	**Peugeot RCZ HDI**	**130**
55	SP7	48	(Sweden) Porsche Center Boras	(Sweden) Christer Pernvall (Sweden) Claes Lund (Sweden) Hans Andreasson (Sweden) Patrik Ljunggren	Porsche 996 GT3 Cup	130
56	V6	241		(Germany) Reinhold Renger (Switzerland) Friedhelm Obermeier (Switzerland) Friedrich Obermeier (Germany) Martin Tschomia	BMW Z4 M Coupe	130
57	SP8T	72	(Germany) Götz Motorsport	(New Zealand) Lewis Scott (New Zealand) Stuart Owers (Germany) Olaf Schley (New Zealand) Peter Millener	Audi RS4	130
58	SP3	165		(Germany) "Rennsemmel" (Germany) Jürgen Peter (Germany) Dieter Schmidtmann	Renault Clio	129
59	SP3T	140	(Germany) Kissling Motorsport	(Germany) Otto Fritzsche (Finland) Julius Nieminen (Germany) Thomas Nack (Germany) Jürgen Fritzsche	Opel Astra GTC	129
60	SP4T	126	(Germany) Raeder Motorsport	(Germany) Christian Hohenadel (Sweden) Jimmy Johansson (Spain) Miguel Molina (Italy) Andrea Piccini	Audi TT RS	128
61	V6	238	(Germany) MSC Adenau	(Germany) Stefan Manheller (Germany) Hajo Müller (Germany) Michael Prym (Switzerland) Michael Pflüger	BMW Z4 M Coupe	127
62	SP3T	137		(Germany) Raphael Hundeborn (Liechtenstein) Nils Berger (Germany) Bernd Schneider (France) Daniel Dupont	Seat Leon Supercopa	127
63	SP4T	127	(Germany) MSC Adenau e.V.	(Germany) Stephan Wölflick (Switzerland) Urs Bressan (Germany) Jürgen Gagstatter (Germany) Carsten Foese	Ford Focus	127
64	**SP6**	**92**		**(Germany) Michael Alhäuser (Germany) Ronny Weber (Japan) Kenij Kobayashi (Germany) "Quick Vick"**	**BMW M3 E46**	**127**
65	D1T	182		(Germany) Jörg Kirsten (Germany) Achim Walter (Germany) Alexander Schula	Alfa Romeo 147	127
66	**V4**	**218**	**(Germany) Team AutoArenA Motorsport**	**(Germany) Hannes Pfledderer (Germany) Patrick Assenheimer (Germany) Marc Marbach**	**Mercedes-Benz C 230**	**126**
67	V5	233	(Germany) RCN e.V.	(Germany) Marco Zabel (Germany) Rolf Buchstaller (Germany) Niklas Steinhaus (Germany) Dirk Steinhaus	BMW Z4 Coupe	126
68	SP6	93		(United Kingdom) Guy Povey (United Kingdom) Allan Sheperd (France) Eric van de Vyver (United Kingdom) Jamie Martin	BMW M3 E46	126
69	V5	227	(Germany) Black Falcon Team TMD Friction	(Germany) Markus Enzinger (Germany) Christian Reiter (Germany) Jörg Krell (Germany) Sebastian Krell	BMW Z4	126
70	SP7	53		(Germany) Uwe Nittel (Germany) Dierk Möller-Sonntag (Germany) Christian Gebhardt (Germany) Uwe Krumscheid	Artega GT	126
71	SP8T	73	(Germany) Götz Motorsport	(Germany) Christian Kohlhaas (Germany) Axel Dufier (United States) Vic Rice (United States) Shane Lewis	Audi RS 4	126
72	SP3T	138	(Germany) ADAC Mittelrhein e.V.	(Germany) Dennis Näher (Germany) Benjamin Palubitzki (Germany) Christian Schmitz (Germany) Sönke Glöde	Opel Astra OPC	126
73	SP3T	143		(Germany) Heiner Immig (New Zealand) Wayne Moore (New Zealand) Maurice O’Reilly (Germany) Maximilian Hackländer	Seat Leon Supercopa	125
74	V4	219		(Austria) Gerald Fischer (Germany) Stephan Lipp (Austria) Michael Hollerweger (Austria) Martin Jakubowics	BMW 325i	125
75	SP3T	145	(Germany) Team Mathol Racing	(Germany) Jörg Kittelmann (Germany) Klaus Dieter Müller (Germany) Dr. Jörg Wilhelm (Germany) Eberhard Schneider	Seat Leon Supercopa	124
76	V6	250	(United Kingdom) Brunswick Automotive	(United Kingdom) Mark Griffiths (United Kingdom) Matt McFadden (United Kingdom) Perry Julian	BMW M3	124
77	SP5	107		(Germany) Patrick Rehs (Germany) Sascha Rehs (Germany) Konstantin Wolf (Germany) Ralf Reinolsmann	BMW 130i GTR	123
78	**SP4**	**131**	**(Germany) Bergischer Motor Club e.V. i. ADAC**	**(Italy) Gianvito Rossi (Italy) Diego Romanini (Italy) Alfredo Varini (Germany) Alexander Rappold**	**BMW 325i E92**	**122**
79	**V3**	**212**	**(Germany) Sponsorcard: Bonk Motorsport**	**(Germany) Wolf Silvester (Germany) Axel Burghardt (Germany) Fabian Sigwart (Germany) Alexander Mies**	**BMW 320 Si**	**122**
80	SP7	49	(Sweden) Porsche Center Boras	(Sweden) Andreas Carlsson (Sweden) Sten Carlsson (Sweden) Ulf Larssson (Sweden) John Larssson	Porsche 911 GT3 RS	122
81	SP10 GT4	6	(United Kingdom) Aston Martin Racing	(United Kingdom) Darren Turner (Japan) Shinichi Katsura (Australia) Robert Scott Thomson (Germany) Jürgen Stumpf	Aston Martin Vantage N24	122
82	SP8	79	(United Kingdom) RJN Motorsport	(Germany) Michael Krumm (Germany) Sabine Schmitz (Germany) Holger Eckhardt (Japan) Tetsuya Tanaka	Nissan 370 Z	122
83	V6	239		(Switzerland) Lorenzo Rocco (United Kingdom) Teofilo Masera (United Kingdom) Didier Denat (Germany) Thomas Ehlke	BMW M3 E46	121
84	SP6	90	(Germany) MSC Rhön e.V. i. AvD	(France) Pierre de Thoisy (France) Therry Depoix (France) Philippe Haezebrouck	BMW M3	121
85	SP7	54	(United Kingdom) Moore International Motorsport	(United Kingdom) Willie Moore (United Kingdom) Bill Cameron (United Kingdom) Calum Lockie	Porsche 997 Cup	121
86	**N2**	**248**		**(Australia) Rod Hicks (New Zealand) Mark Corbett (New Zealand) Dean Cockerton (New Zealand) Mike Eady**	**Honda Civic Type-R**	**121**
87	D1T	183	(Germany) H&R Spezialfedern	(Italy) Alberto Bergamaschi (Germany) Herwarth Wartenberg Jr. (Germany) Zoran Radulovic (Germany) Robert Schröder	Volkswagen Golf V R-Tdi	120
88	V6	236	(Germany) Scuderia Augustusburg Brühl e.V. i. ADAC	(Germany) Dieter Weidenbrück (Germany) Christian Wack (Germany) Markus Schmickler (Germany) Mario Merten	BMW Z4 M Coupé	120
89	SP8	3		(Germany) Dr. Ulrich Bez (Germany) Wolfgang Schuhbauer (Germany) Horst von Saurma (Hong Kong) Matthew Marsh	Aston Martin V12 Zagato	119
90	V4	216		(Germany) Ben Lake (Germany) Jürgen Wimbauer (Germany) Stefan Gössel (Italy) Mauro Simoncini	BMW 325i	118
91	SP3	167		(Germany) Sascha Hancke (United Arab Emirates) Nadir Zuhour (Germany) Dr. Joachim Steidel (United Arab Emirates) Karim Al-Azhari	Renault Clio	117
92	AT	202	(Germany) Tuning Akademie	(Germany) Thomas Hanisch (Germany) Klaus Leinfelder (Germany) Hans Keutmann (United States) Spencer Trenery	Audi A4 quattro	117
93	SP10 GT4	65	(United Kingdom) RJN Motorsport	(Denmark) Kurt Thiim (United Kingdom) Guy Smith (United Kingdom) Alex Buncombe (Netherlands) Duncan Huisman	Nissan 370 Z	117
94	SP5	112		(Germany) Michael Tischner (Germany) Ulrich Becker (Germany) Karl Brinker (Germany) Matthias Tischner	BMW M3 GTR E46	117
95	V5	232	(Germany) Team DMV e.V.	(Germany) Lothar Wilms (Germany) Christopher Peters (Germany) Ralf Zensen	Porsche Cayman	116
96	D1T	184	(United States) Marcos Racing Int.	(United States) Hal Prewitt (United States) Toto Lassally (United States) Jim Briody (Netherlands) Cor Euser	BMW 120d	116
97	V6	207		(Germany) David Ackermann (Germany) Jens Riemer (Germany) Raphael Klingmann (Russia) Sergey Gorbunov	BMW M3 E46	116
98	SP4T	123		(Germany) Uwe Reich (Germany) Marc Uwe von Niesewand Reich (Germany) Michael Lachmayer (Germany) Christian Kranenberg	Ford Focus ST	116
99	V3	213	(Germany) MSC Ruhr-Blitz Bochum e.V.	(Germany) Frank Kuhlmann (Germany) Mark Giesbrecht (Germany) Dino Drössiger (Germany) Thomas Heitmann	Honda Civic Type-R	115
100	**V2**	**204**		**(Germany) Andreas Schwarz (Germany) Christian Sporenberg (Germany) Michael Holz**	**BMW 318 is E36**	**115**
101	SP5	119		(France) Jean Paul Pagny (France) Dominique Nury (France) Bernard Salam (France) Jean-Marc Rivet-Fusil	BMW 130 i Cup	115
102	N2	247		(New Zealand) Brian Mc Govern (New Zealand) Greg Spark (New Zealand) Jeff Lowrey (New Zealand) Alistair Taylor	Honda Civic Type-R	114
103	SP4T	111	(Germany) Sponsorcard: Pro handicap e.V.	(Germany) Wolfgang Müller (France) Oliver Rudolph	Audi TTS	114
104	SP3	176		(Denmark) Michael Juul (Denmark) Claus Grönning (Switzerland) Amanda Hennessy (Switzerland) Robert Dubler	Renault Clio Cup III	114
105	SP3T	139	(Germany) Dörr Motorsport	(Germany) Christian Penno (Germany) Friedrich Holoch (Germany) Roland Konrad (Germany) Heiko Hahn	BMW Mini Cooper	114
106	SP3T	146	(United Kingdom) MINI Motorsport	(Germany) Hendrik Vieth (Germany) Ralf Martin (Austria) Jürgen Schmarl (Germany) Anja Wassertheurer	Mini Cooper	114
107	V6	243		(Germany) Rene Wolff (France) Pascal Bour (France) Fabrice Reicher (Germany) Harald Rettich	BMW M3	114
108	SP3	144		(Germany) Markus Fugel (Germany) Uwe Wächtler (Liechtenstein) Ruben Zeltner (Germany) Peter Corazza	Honda S 2000	114
109	V3	199	(Germany) MSC Ruhr-Blitz Bochum e.V. im ADAC	(Germany) Dietmar Hanitzsch (Germany) Michael Eichhorn (Germany) Manfred Anspann	Opel Astra G OPC	113
110	SP3	172	(Germany) Teichmann Racing GmbH	(Germany) Michael Schneider (Italy) Ugo Vicenzi (Germany) Marcel Hartl (Germany) Ralph-Gerhard Schlüter	Renault Clio Cup	113
111	SP8	5	(United Kingdom) Aston Martin Racing	(United Kingdom) Christopher Porritt (United Kingdom) Richard Meaden (United Kingdom) Peter Cate (Germany) Oliver Mathai	Aston Martin V12 Zagato	113
112	N2	246		(Norway) Ola Setsaas (Norway) Jorgen Pettersen (Norway) Tore Bjoernstad (Norway) Havard Gustad	Honda Civic Type-R	111
113	SP3	171	(Germany) AC Mayen e.V. i. ADAC	(Germany) Mike Dohmen (United States) Bruce Trenery (Germany) Dominic Liedtke (Germany) Michael Klein	Volkswagen Golf 3 16V	111
114	D1T	181	(Netherlands) Red Camel Jordans-NL	(Netherlands) Ivo Breukers (Netherlands) Henk Thijssen (Netherlands) Antonius Verkoelen	Seat Leon 2.0 TDI	109
115	SP4T	128	(Germany) FH Köln Motorsport e.V.	(Germany) Anja Wassertheurer (Austria) Daniela Schmid (Germany) Benjamin Koske (Germany) Stefan Schlesack	Ford Focus RS	109
116	SP3T	154	(Germany) s.i.g-Motorsport	(Switzerland) Steffen Schmid (Germany) Ingo Gaupp (Germany) Michael Mönch (Germany) Martin Heidrich	BMW Mini Cooper JCW	109
117	SP8	85	(Germany) AVIA Racing Team Bratke	(Germany) Stefan Kurt Neuhorn (Germany) Rolf Lamberty (Germany) Oliver Louisoder (Germany) Gerd Niemeyer	Aston Martin GT4	108
118	SP3T	147	(United Kingdom) MINI Motorsport	(Sweden) Fredrik Lestrup (Germany) Nico Bastian (Germany) Harald Hennes	BMW Mini Cooper JCW	108
119	V3	210		(Germany) Alexander Herrmann (Netherlands) Han Hoendervangers (Germany) Dr. Alexander Berstein (Germany) Achim Herrmann	BMW 320i E36	108
120	SP3	175	(Germany) Team Mathol Racing e.V.	(Germany) Thomas Heinrich (Germany) Dirk Kauke (Germany) Josef Stengel (Germany) Eberhard Schneider	Honda S2000	107
121	SP3	159	(Germany) AC Mayen e.V. im ADAC	(Germany) Florian Effertz (Argentina) Jose Visir (Argentina) Gustavo Fontana (Germany) Christian Borchart	Volkswagen Golf 3 16V	107
122	D1T	180	(Germany) AMC Hoyel e.V. im ADAC	(Germany) Marco Knappmeier (Germany) Maik Knappmeier (Germany) Achim Johanns (Germany) Klaus Flint	Volkswagen Golf 5 TDI	107
123	SP5	105	(Germany) Lingmann Motorsport	(Italy) Luigi Scalini (Switzerland) Patrick Trucco (Germany) Bernd Kleeschulte (Switzerland) Kurt Thiel	BMW M3	106
124	SP3	163		(Germany) Andreas Dingert (Germany) Eric Freichels (Germany) Sven Kurtenbach (Germany) Rolf Weißenfels	Volkswagen Golf 3 Kitcar	106
125	SP3	164	(Germany) Schlaug Motorsport	(Mexico) Xavier Lamadrid (Mexico) Xavier Lamadrid, Sr. (United Kingdom) Max Girardo (United Kingdom) Mark Donaldson	Renault Clio RS	105
126	SP3T	153	(Germany) s.i.g-Motorsport	(Germany) Andyh Glanc (Japan) Hitoshi Goto (Germany) Dirk Lauth (Serbia) Igor Ljubas	BMW Mini Cooper	105
127	V3	209		(Germany) Michael Auert (Germany) Thomas Lennackers (Germany) Christoph Brune (Germany) Hendrik Kebben	Opel Astra OPC	105
128	SP3	177	(Denmark) Jet Black Racing	(Denmark) Anders Majgaard (Denmark) Niels Borum (Denmark) Dan Träger (United States) Johnny O'Connell	Renault Clio Cup III	101
129	SP3	160	(Germany) Kissling Motorsport AvD	(Germany) Olaf Beckmann (Germany) Volker Strycek (Germany) Peter Hass (Germany) Jürgen Schulten	Opel Manta (Flying Fox) GT	97
130	SP10 GT4	75	(United Kingdom) Aston Martin Racing	(Germany) Karl Pflanz (United Kingdom) Peter Venn (Germany) Oliver Bliss (Germany) Jörg Sandek	Aston Martin Vantage N24	96
131	V3	214	(Germany) Team Mathol Racing	(Switzerland) Sebastian Schäfer (Germany) Christian Eichner (Switzerland) Rüdiger Schicht	Honda Civic Type-R	95
132	SP3	173	(Germany) Schläppi Race-Tec	(Germany) Holger Goedicke (Switzerland) Felix Geisser (Switzerland) Nicolas Abril (Spain) Stig Näs	Renault Clio Cup	94
133	SP3	174	(Germany) Schläppi Race-Tec	(Argentina) Omar El Bacha (Argentina) Gaston Ricardo (Argentina) Ruben Salerno (Argentina) Jorge Cersosimo	Renault Clio Cup	84
134	SP8	87	(Japan) Gazoo Racing	(Japan) Takayuki Kinoshita (Germany) André Lotterer (Japan) Juichi Wakisaka	Lexus LF-A	83
135	V5	215		(Germany) Joe Kramer (Germany) Michael Rebhan (Denmark) Holger Knudsen (United States) Jim Chambers	BMW M3 GT	78
DNF	E1-XP2	7	(Germany) BMW Motorsport	(Germany) Dirk Müller (Germany) Dirk Werner (Germany) Dirk Adorf (Portugal) Pedro Lamy	BMW M3 GT	139
DNF	SP10 GT4	62	(Germany) Team Mathol Racing e.V.	(Germany) Wolfgang Weber (Germany) Rickard Nilsson (Germany) Norbert Bermes (Germany) Uwe Nittel	Aston Martin Vantage V8 GT4	131
DNF	V5	228	(Germany) ADAC Ostwestfalen-Lippe e.V.	(Germany) Dominik Thiemann (Germany) "Bugs Bunny" Köln (Germany) Thomas Frank (Germany) Thomas Ahles	BMW E36	128
DNF	SP7	57		(Germany) Kersten Jodexnis (Germany) Wolfgang Destreé (Germany) Andreas Ziegler (Germany) Norbert Pauels	Porsche 997 GT3 RSR	120
DNF	**D3T**	**193**	**(Germany) RG Bergisch Gladbach e.V. im ADAC**	**(Germany) Thomas Haider (Germany) Marc Hiltscher (Germany) Gregor Hötzel (Germany) Joachim Schulz**	**BMW 330d**	**120**
DNF	SP3T	156	(Germany) H & R Spezialfedern	(Germany) Armin Holz (Germany) Maik Poetzl (Germany) Thomas Schiemann (Germany) Kai Jordan	Volkswagen Golf GTI	118
DNF	SP9 GT3	4	(Germany) Need for Speed Team Schubert	(Germany) Marko Hartung (Germany) Jörg Viebahn (Netherlands) Tom Coronel (Germany) Claudia Hürtgen	BMW Z4 GT3	114
DNF	SP8T	235	(Germany) Volkswagen Motorsport	(United Kingdom) Johnny Herbert (Germany) René Rast (Germany) Patrick Bernhardt (United Kingdom) Mark Blundell	Volkswagen Golf24	112
DNF	SP3	168	(Germany) DMC Düren e.V. im ADAC	(Germany) Jörg Walkowski (Germany) Benjamin Weidner (Germany) Marco Keller (Germany) Dietmar Henke	Renault Clio	112
DNF	V4	221	(Germany) Bergischer Motor Club e.V. i. ADAC	(Germany) Daniel Sorg (Germany) Jana Meiswinkel (Germany) Ferdinand Baratella (Germany) Benjamin Sorg	BMW 325i E90	109
DNF	SP3T	148		(Germany) Kim Hauschild (Germany) Marcel Belka (Germany) Jean-Marie Rathje (Germany) Bernd Albrecht	Seat Supercopa	103
DNF	V4	217		(Germany) Kornelius Hoffmann (Germany) Reiner Bardenheuer (Germany) Dirk Roth (Germany) Thomas Simon	BMW E46 325i	99
DNF	SP7	59	(Germany) Dörr Motorsport	(Germany) Markus Grossmann (Germany) Timo Kluck (Germany) Christian Gebhardt (Italy) Marco Mapelli	Porsche 911 GT3 Cup	96
DNF	SP9 GT3	77	(Germany) Need for Speed Team Schubert	(Norway) Anders Buchardt (Germany) Peter Posavac (United States) John Mayes (Norway) Stian Sorlie	BMW Z4 GT3	94
DNF	V4	220	(Germany) Dolate Motorsport	(Germany) Frank Unverhau (Germany) Marco Petry (Germany) Günther Hartwig (Japan) Toshiya Ito	BMW 325i E46	94
DNF	SP9 GT3	31	(Germany) H & R Spezialfedern	(Germany) Jürgen Alzen (Italy) Artur Deutgen (Germany) Klaus Ludwig (Germany) Sascha Bert	Porsche GT3 Cup S	93
DNF	D3T	194		(Argentina) Jose Manuel Balbiani (Argentina) Juan Cusano (Argentina) Alejandro Chahwan (Argentina) Sergio Rodriguez	BMW 335 d GTR	89
DNF	V5	231		(Australia) Richard Gartner (Australia) Ray Stubber (Australia) Paul Stubber	BMW M3 E36	80
DNF	SP10 GT4	64	(Germany) Sponsorcard: Bonk Motorsport	(Germany) Andreas Möntmann (United Kingdom) Tim Mullen (United Kingdom) Adam Christodoulou (United Kingdom) Phil Quaife	BMW M3	75
DNF	SP3	162		(Germany) Janik Olivo (Germany) Elmar Jurek (Germany) Thorsten Wolter (Germany) Michael Brüggenkamp	Renault Clio RS III	75
DNF	D1T	200	(France) Team Peugeot RCZ Nokia	(France) Alexandre Prémat (France) Jonathan Cochet (France) Bruce Jouanny (France) Stephane Caillet	Peugeot RCZ HDI	72
NC	V6	237		(Japan) Hiroyuki Kishimoto (Austria) Dieter Svepes (Japan) Kenichi Maejima (Germany) Jürgen Bussmann	BMW M3 E46	68
DNF	SP3T	150	(Germany) Sponsorcard: MSC Adenau e.V.	(Germany) Mike Jäger (Germany) Stefan Michels (Germany) Marko Stipp (Germany) Christian Schmitz	Audi S3	67
DNF	AT	203		(Germany) Ralph Caba (Germany) Volker Lange (Germany) Oliver Sprungmann	Ford Fiesta	67
NC	SP3	161	(Germany) Team DMV	(Germany) Hans-Christoph Schäfer (Germany) Tobias Jung (Germany) Jochen Vollmer (Germany) Marcus Bulgrin	Seat Ibiza	66
DNF	D3T	195	(Germany) Dörr Motorsport	(Germany) Kristian Vetter (Germany) Frank Weishar (Germany) Reinhard Prenzel (Germany) Jörg Weidinger	BMW 135d	63
NC	D1T	178	(Germany) Pistenclub e.V.	(Germany) Paul Martin Dose (Germany) Andreas Hetzel (Switzerland) Samo Mazi (Germany) Dankwarth Weyand	Volkswagen Golf IV RTDi	63
DNF	SP9 GT3	76	(Germany) Need for Speed Team Schubert	(Sweden) Edward Sandström (United States) Tommy Milner (Sweden) Fredrik Larsson (Germany) Claudia Hürtgen	BMW Z4 GT3	61
DNF	SP7	47	(Germany) Sponsorcard: Car Collection Motorsport	(Germany) Peter Schmidt (Germany) Klaus Koch (Switzerland) Ronnie Saurenmann (Germany) Stephen "Don Stephano"	Porsche 997 GT3 Cup	61
DNF	SP3T	141	(Italy) Costa Ovest Promotorsport	(Italy) Umberto Nacamuli (Italy) Mario Bertola (Italy) Gianni Checcoli (Italy) Marco Biancardi	Seat Leon	59
DNF	SP9 GT3	36	(Germany) Rowe Racing	(Germany) Alexander Roloff (Germany) Roland Rehfeld (Germany) Hubert Haupt (Germany) Marco Schelp	Mercedes-Benz SLS AMG GT3	58
DNF	SP9 GT3	24	(Germany) Race & Event	(Germany) Heinz Schmersal (Germany) Christoph Koslowski (Germany) Eckhard Geulen (Germany) Klaus-Dieter Frers	Mercedes-Benz SLS AMG GT3	56
DNF	SP7	50	(Germany) Sponsorcard: MSC Adenau e.V.	(Netherlands) Patrick Huisman (Germany) Florian Fricke (Germany) Julian Moritz Dercks (United Kingdom) Nick Tandy	Porsche 997 GT3 Cup	53
DNF	SP3T	106		(Denmark) Udo Schauland (Italy) Alessandro Cremascoli (Germany) Massimo Colnago (Germany) Moritz Kröner	Seat Leon Supercopa	53
DNF	SP7	19	(Germany) Manthey-Racing	(Germany) Rainer Holte (Germany) H.-P. Lieb (Germany) Arne Hoffmeister (United Kingdom) Daniel Cooke	Porsche 911 GT3 Cup	51
DNF	SP4T	122	(Germany) ADAC Nordbaden e.V.	(Germany) Rudolf Brandl (Germany) Torsten Kratz (Germany) Torsten Platz (Germany) Bernd Hömberg	Audi TT RS	50
DNF	SP9 GT3	30	(Germany) Mamerow / Rowe Racing	(Germany) Christian Mamerow (Germany) Armin Hahne (Germany) Pierre Kaffer	Mercedes-Benz SLS AMG GT3	49
NC	AT	40		(Germany) Titus Dittmann (Germany) Julius Dittmann (Germany) Victor Smolski (Germany) Markus Lungstrass	Chrysler Viper	49
DNF	V6	240		(Germany) Heiko Hedemann (United Kingdom) Ralf Willems (Germany) Mirko Keller (Germany) Klaus Weigner	BMW Z4 M	48
DNF	SP7	58	(Germany) Team DMV e.V.	(Germany) André Krumbach (Germany) Holger Fuchs (Germany) Harald Schlotter (Germany) Malte Mahlert	Porsche 997 GT3	44
DNF	SP3T	152	(Germany) Alpecin Schirra motoring	(Germany) Friedrich von Bohlen (Germany) Markus Oestreich (Ecuador) Andrés Serrano (New Zealand) Peter Scharmach	BMW Mini Cooper	43
DNF	SP8T	35	(Germany) Volkswagen Motorsport	(Germany) Peter Terting (Denmark) Nicki Thiim (France) Franck Mailleux (Germany) René Rast	Volkswagen Golf24	40
DNF	SP3T	151	(Germany) Sponsorcard: MSC Adenau e.V.	(Germany) Stephan Herter (Germany) Max Sandritter (Germany) Bora Bölck (Germany) Heiko Hammel	Seat Leon MK2	39
DNF	V5	229		(Germany) Steve Smith (Netherlands) Einar Thorsen (Germany) Nils Reimer (Germany) Reinhold Renger	BMW M3 E36	39
DNF	SP8T	135	(Germany) Volkswagen Motorsport	(Germany) Thomas Mutsch (Sweden) Fredrik Ekblom (Germany) Patrick Simon (Italy) Edoardo Mortara	Volkswagen Golf24	37
NC	N2	249	(Belgium) East Belgian Racing Team	(Belgium) Jacky Delvaux (Belgium) René Marin (Belgium) Bruno Beulen	Renault Clio RS	37
DNF	SP5	108	(Germany) MSC Rhön e.V. i. AvD / Sponsorcard: AvD	(Germany) Wolfgang Kudrass (Germany) Christian Leutheuser (Germany) Hubert Nacken (Germany) Uli Packeisen	BMW E82	36
DNF	SP3	166		(Germany) Fabian Müller (Germany) Roland Botor (United Kingdom) Scott Marshall (Germany) Jens Hawner	Renault Clio	35
DNF	SP9 GT3	69	(Germany) Dörr Motorsport	(Germany) Rudi Adams (United Kingdom) Chris Goodwin (Germany) Arno Klasen (Germany) Arnd Meier	BMW Z4 GT3	34
DNF	N2	245	(Germany) AMC Hoyel e.V. im ADAC	(Germany) Sebastian Flint (Germany) Sascha Gies (Germany) Dirk Groneck (Germany) Tim Groneck	Peugeot 206 RC	30
DNF	SP8	41		(Germany) Jürgen Schumann (Germany) Peter Schumann (Germany) Georg Berlandy (Germany) Alexander Köppen	Hyundai Genesis Coupé V6	29
DNF	SP8	43		(Australia) Mal Rose (Australia) Peter Leemhuis (Australia) Damien Flack	Holden Commodore	28
DNF	SP3T	149		(Norway) Hakon Schjaerin (Norway) Atle Gulbrandsen (Norway) Christian Krognes (Norway) Kenneth Jensen Ostwold	Audi TT	27
DNF	SP6	169	(Germany) Dörr Motorsport	(Germany) Stefan Aust (Switzerland) Hanspeter Strehler (Germany) Alexander Hofmann (Germany) Rolf Scheibner	BMW Z4 Coupe	27
NC	AT	205		(Germany) Smudo (Germany) Tom von Löwis of Menar (Germany) Charlotte Wilking (Germany) Tim Schrick	Volkswagen Scirocco 2.0 TDI	25
DNF	V6	244	(Germany) Team DMV e.V.	(Switzerland) Ivan Jacoma (Germany) Dr. Nicola Bravetti (Switzerland) Matteo Cassina (Germany) Johann Wanger	Porsche Cayman S	24
DNF	V6	223	(Germany) Sponsorcard: MSC Adenau	(Germany) Thomas Koll (Germany) Heinz-Josef Bermes (Germany) Michael Hess (Germany) Herbert von Danwitz	Porsche Cayman	22
DNF	SP3	158	(Germany) Scuderia Offenbach	(Germany) Andreas Weiland (Luxembourg) Antonine Feidt (Germany) Ralph-Peter Rink	Renault Clio Cup III	16
DNF	SP7	42	(Austria) Pinta Racing	(Germany) Felix Illbruck (Germany) Matthias Hoffsümmer (Germany) Dr. Edgar Althoff (Germany) S. Elch	Porsche GT3 Cup	15
DNF	SP9 GT3	11	(Germany) Manthey-Racing	(Germany) Marc Lieb (Germany) Timo Bernhard (France) Romain Dumas (Germany) Lucas Luhr	Porsche 911 GT3 R	13
DNF	SP7	37		(Germany) Michael Schratz (Germany) Johannes Siegler (United States) Jim Michaelian (Sweden) Carl Rydquist	Porsche 997 GT3 Cup	12
DNF	V2	206	(Germany) MSC Wahlscheid e.V. im ADAC	(Germany) Michael Jestädt (Germany) Werner Schlehecker (Germany) Günter Memminger (Germany) Stefan Memminger	BMW 318 is	12
DNF	SP5	114		(Germany) Frank Nöhring (United Kingdom) Colin White (United Kingdom) Meyrick Cox	BMW M3 E46	11
DNF	SP9 GT3	29	(Hong Kong) Audi race experience	(Germany) Florian Gruber (Germany) Chris Vogler (Germany) Wolfgang Dess (Germany) Emin Akata	Audi R8 LMS GT3	10
DNF	SP5	91		(Germany) Franz Groß (Germany) Maximilian Groß (Germany) Thomas Müller (Germany) Erwin Lukas	BMW M3	10
DNF	V5	208	(Germany) ADAC Ostwestfalen-Lippe e.V.	(Germany) Dominik Thiemann (Germany) "Bugs Bunny" (Germany) Thomas Frank (Germany) Thomas Ahles	BMW E36	4
DNF	SP3T	136		(Australia) Malcolm Niall (Australia) Clint Harvey (Australia) Brett Niall (Australia) Mark Pilatti	Seat Leon Supercopa	1

== Bibliography ==
- Jörg-Richard Ufer & Tim Upietz. 24 Stunden Nürburgring Nordschleife 2011. Gruppe C Motorsport Verlag. ISBN 978-3-928540-65-0.
