= 2010 24 Hours of Nürburgring =

Endurance motor race in Germany

2010 ADAC 24 Hours of Nürburgring

Seasons
- ← 2009 2011 →

Nürburgring 24h track (Nordschleife+GP Circuit without Mercedes-Arena)

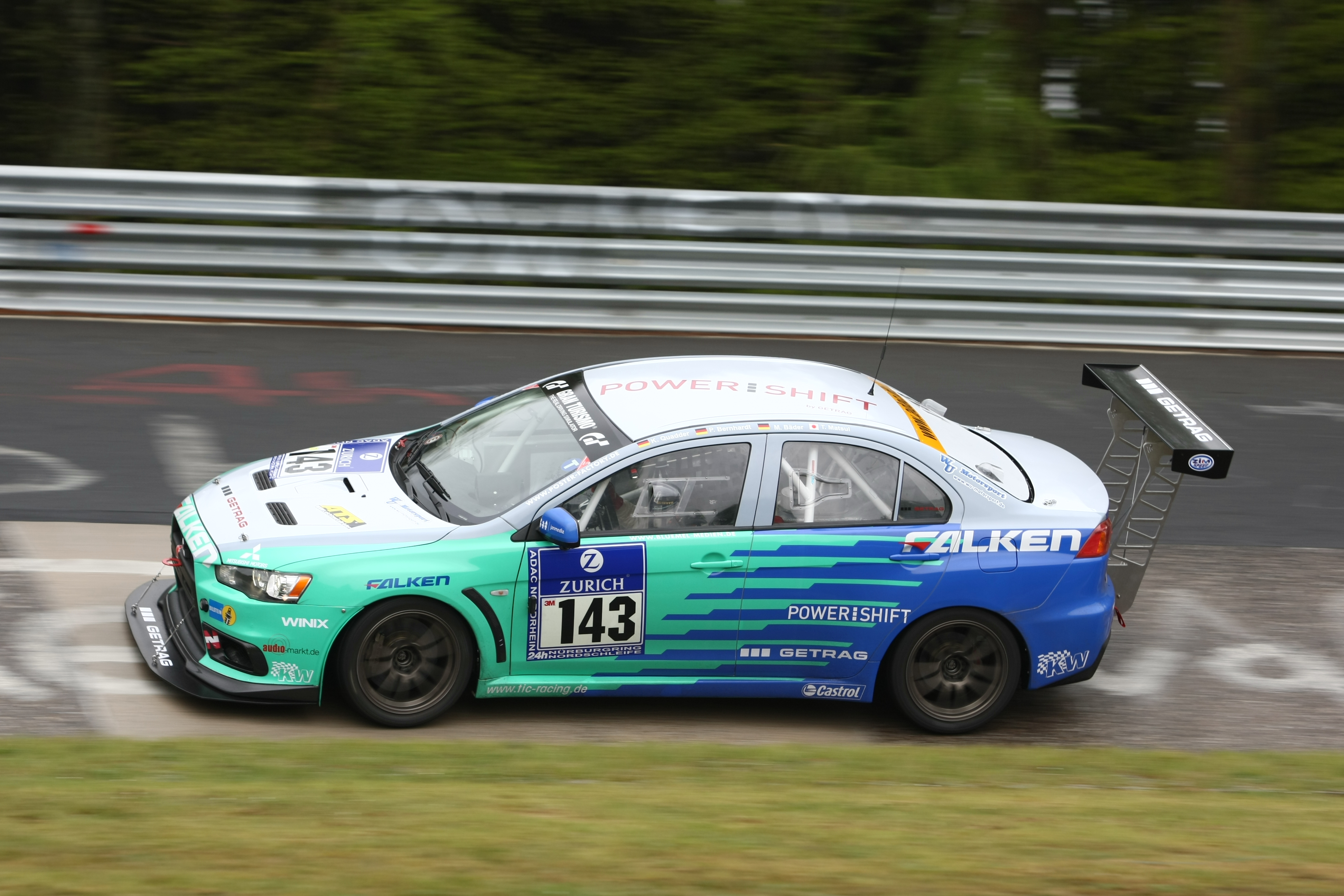
A Mitsubishi Lancer Evo 10 at the 2010 Nürburgring 24 Hours

The 2010 24 Hours of Nürburgring was an endurance sports car race held at the Nürburgring Nordschleife race track in Germany on May 13–16.

== Resume ==
The event saw the return of most prominent entries, except the Ford GT, as team Raeder had discontinued this project. To give teams time to rest or for repairs before the race, the night practice was scheduled on Thursday evening. In cold and wet conditions, the Farnbacher-entered Ferrari F430 GTC set the best lap time before the session was red-flagged due to fog. In Friday afternoon qualifying, held in fair weather, it crashed out and was barely repaired in time for the race. Four of the five factory-backed Audi R8 LMS (officially entered by "customers", which happened to be the Audi-DTM-teams Phoenix Racing and Abt Sportsline) occupied the first four places on the grid, with Marco Werner setting pole at 8:24.753 with a new record average speed of 181 km/h (112 mph). With lap times around 8:29, three of Porsche's new SP9/GT3-class cars occupied places 5 to 7, two of them entered by four-time winner Team Manthey, which had chosen to let the #1 car do only a single lap. BMW had entered two of their ALMS BMW M3 GT2, run by Schnitzer Motorsport. Due to the modifications that include a transaxle gear box, they do not comply with the standard rules set of SP classes and their "Balance of Performance". Along with a factory-entered Porsche GT3 Hybrid, the GT2-BMWs have thus been grouped into the E1-XP class for experimental factory entries. The better BMW and the Hybrid posted times of 8:32 and 8:34 in qualifying. Save for the 16th placed GT3-class Dodge Viper, only several other Porsche, Audi R8 and V8-powered BMW Z4 GT3 have qualified in the top 20, with times up to 8:47, which earns them a blue flashlight that is supposed to facilitate passing of the approx. 180 slower cars.

Porsche test driver Walter Röhrl had intended to enter on a standard road legal Porsche 911 GT3 RS, but had to withdraw for health reasons from the team that comprises racers Roland Asch and Patrick Simon, plus journalists Horst von Saurma and Chris Harris. The car, entered in cooperation with sport auto (Germany), is registered as S-GO 2400, and was driven from Weissach to Nürburg. It has qualified with 9:15, 42nd overall, and 9th among the 17 SP7 class entrants, only beaten by its race-prepped Porsche 997 siblings.

The race was started on Saturday 3 p.m. in sunny but cold weather. Already on the Grand Prix track, the #1 Manthey Porsche driven by five-time winner Marcel Tiemann passed all Audis, taking the lead and pulling away about 100 m (330 ft) before catching up in lap 2 with the slowest cars of the third group, which were still in their first lap. After lap 3, three Porsche lead ahead of three Audi, a BMW M3 and the Hybrid-Porsche, which due to its larger range could take the lead after the others pitted. The #1 Manthey Porsche led by a couple of minutes until it got involved in a collision after seven hours. At halftime, the race is on pace to another distance record, with the Audi #99 leading by a small margin ahead of the Hybrid Porsche, the only remaining representative of his brand in the top 8, which used to be dominated by Porsche in recent years. Places three to eight were occupied by three Audi R8, two BMW, and, rather surprisingly, on p 5 the Ferrari which had started in row 21. The Porsches that occupy most places up to 15th were followed by the CNG-powered Volkswagen Scirocco GT24, the road-legal Porsche GT3 RS and a Nissan Z33. On Sunday morning, the #99 Audi needed a rear axle change, and with less than 5 hours to go, also the second place #2 Audi failed. This left the Hybrid Porsche in a one lap lead ahead of the #25 BMW GT2 with gearbox woes and the Ferrari, until also the Porsche stopped with less than two hours to go. The BMW made it to the finish, giving Pedro Lamy a record-tying fifth win ahead of Ferrari and Audi. The best Porsche, entered by Alzen, finished only sixth, six laps ahead of the Falken Nissan and the road legal GT3.

The SP4 class was won by 4 Argentinian drivers in the BMW 325i E92 Coupe of Motorsport Team Sorg Rennsport. This was the first victory for an Argentinian team at the 24 hours Nürburgring race and the first Argentinian team to compete in the Nürburgring since Juan Manuel Fangio.

== Race Results ==
Class winners in bold.

38th ADAC Zurich 24h-Rennen
Pos	Class	No	Team/Entrant	Drivers	Vehicle	Laps
**1**	**E1-XP2**	**25**	**(Germany) BMW Motorsport**	**(Germany) Jörg Müller (Brazil) Augusto Farfus (Germany) Uwe Alzen (Portugal) Pedro Lamy**	**BMW M3 GT2**	**154**
**2**	**SP7**	**2**	**(Germany) Hankook Team Farnbacher**	**(Germany) Dominik Farnbacher (Denmark) Allan Simonsen (United States) Lehman Keen (Germany) Marco Seefried**	**Ferrari F430 GTC**	**154**
**3**	**SP9 GT3**	**97**	**(Germany) Phoenix Racing GmbH**	**(Germany) Dennis Rostek (Germany) Luca Ludwig (Germany) Marc Bronzel (Germany) Markus Winkelhock**	**Audi R8 LMS**	**153**
4	SP9 GT3	76	(Germany) Need for Speed by Schubert Motorsport	(Germany) Marco Hartung (Sweden) Patrick Söderlund (Sweden) Edward Sandström (Sweden) Martin Öhlin	BMW Z4 GT3	152
5	SP9 GT3	102	(Germany) Black Falcon	(Germany) Christer Jöns (United Kingdom) Sean Paul Breslin (Liechtenstein) Johannes Stuck (Germany) Kenneth Heyer	Audi R8 LMS	152
6	SP9 GT3	20	(Germany) H & R Spezialfedern	(Germany) Jürgen Alzen (Germany) Dominik Schwager (Germany) Thomas Jäger (Germany) Sascha Bert	Porsche GT3 Cup S	151
7	E1-XP2	26	(Germany) BMW Motorsport	(Germany) Dirk Werner (Germany) Dirk Müller (United Kingdom) Andy Priaulx (Germany) Dirk Adorf	BMW M3 GT2	150
8	SP9 GT3	18	(Germany) Team Rowe Motorsport	(Germany) Michael Zehe (Germany) Marco Schelp (Germany) Alexander Roloff (United States) Mark Bullitt	Porsche GT3 Cup S	150
9	SP9 GT3	66	(Germany) Dörr Motorsport GmbH	(Germany) Stefan Aust (Germany) Rudi Adams (Germany) Jochen Übler (Germany) Markus Grossmann	BMW Z4 GT3	149
10	SP7	35	(Germany) Scuderia Offenbach	(Germany) Matthias Weiland (Germany) Rodney Forbes (Germany) Kai Riemer (Germany) David Horn	Porsche 997 GT3 Cup	148
11	SP9 GT3	14	(Ukraine) Tsunami RT	(Ukraine) Alexandr Gayday (Ukraine) Andrii Kruglyk (Russia) Aleksey Basov (Germany) Michael Schratz	Porsche 997 GT3 Cup	147
12	SP7	44	(Japan) Falken Motorsports	(United Kingdom) Peter Dumbreck (Germany) Dirk Schoysman (Japan) Tetsuya Tanaka (Japan) Kazuki Hoshino	Nissan 370Z	145
13	SP7	11	(Germany) Porsche AG	(Germany) Patrick Simon (Germany) Horst von Saurma (Germany) Roland Asch (United Kingdom) Chris Harris	Porsche 997.2 GT3 RS	145
14	SP9 GT3	33	(Germany) RDM-Cargraphic-Logwin-Racing	(Germany) Peter König (Germany) Steffen Schlichenmeier (Germany) Kurt Ecke	Porsche 997 GT3 Cup	145
**15**	**SP3T**	**133**		**(Germany) Elmar Deegener (Germany) Jürgen Wohlfarth (Germany) Christoph Breuer (Germany) Wolfgang Haugg**	**Audi TTS**	**144**
**16**	**AT**	**117**	**(Germany) Volkswagen Motorsport**	**(Qatar) Nasser Al-Attiyah (Belgium) Vanina Ickx (Germany) Dieter Depping (Germany) Klaus Niedzwiedz**	**Volkswagen Scirocco GT24-CNG**	**143**
17	SP9 GT3	28	(Germany) Scuderia Offenbach e.V.	(Germany) Michael Klein (Luxembourg) Antoine Feidt (Germany) "Selch" (Germany) Oliver Freymuth	Porsche 997 GT3 Cup	142
**18**	**SP8**	**50**	**(Japan) Gazoo Racing**	**(Japan) Takayuki Kinoshita (Japan) Akira Iida (Japan) Juichi Wakisaka (Japan) Kazuya Oshima**	**Lexus LF-A**	**142**
19	SP3T	142	(Germany) Opel OPC Race Camp	(Germany) Hendrik Scharf (Germany) Jean-Marie Rathje (Germany) Arne Hoffmeister (Switzerland) Roger Büeler	Opel Astra OPC	141
20	SP9 GT3	88	(Germany) Haribo Team Manthey	(Germany) Hans Guido Riegel (Germany) Mike Stursberg (Germany) Wolfgang Kohler (Germany) Georg Berlandy	Porsche GT3 Cup S	141
**21**	**SP6**	**169**	**(Germany) Dörr Motorsport GmbH**	**(Germany) Stefan Aust (Germany) Dierk Möller-Sonntag (Germany) Peter Posavac (Switzerland) Hanspeter Strehler**	**BMW Z4 M Coupe**	**141**
22	SP3T	141	(Germany) Opel OPC Race Camp	(Germany) Sebastian Amossé (Germany) Rene Hiddel (Switzerland) Thierry Kilchenmann (Germany) Dennis Rieger	Opel Astra OPC	140
23	SP8T	70	(Germany) Team Götz Motorsport	(United States) Vic Rice (United States) Shane Lewis (Germany) Axel Duffner (Germany) Karl Pflanz	Audi RS 4	140
24	SP3T	137	(Japan) Subaru Tecnica International	(Japan) Kazuo Shimizu (Japan) Toshihiro Yoshida (Germany) Marcel Engels (Netherlands) Carlo van Dam	Subaru Impreza WRX	139
25	SP7	96	(Germany) Dörr Motorsport	(Germany) Rolf Scheibner (Germany) Peter Posavac (Germany) Guido Majewski (Germany) Christian Gebhardt	BMW M3 GT4	139
**26**	**SP5**	**106**		**(Germany) Michael Tischner (Germany) Ulrich Becker (Germany) Karl Brinker (Germany) Matthias Tischner**	**BMW M3 GTR E46**	**137**
**27**	**SP10 GT4**	**61**	**(Germany) Mathol Racing**	**(Germany) Wolfgang Weber (Germany) Rickard Nilsson (Germany) Norbert Bermes (Germany) Uwe Nittel**	**Aston Martin Vantage N24**	**137**
28	SP7	48	(Belgium) Level Racing sprl	(Italy) Bruno Barbaro (Italy) Giuseppe Arlotti (Belgium) Olivier Muytjens	Porsche 997 GT3 Cup	137
29	SP7	42		(Germany) Michael Illbruck (Germany) Manuel Lauck (Germany) Jörg van Ommen (Germany) Altfrid Heger	Porsche 997 GT3 Cup	137
**30**	**SP3**	**158**		**(Switzerland) Ralf Schmid (Switzerland) Harald Jacksties (Germany) Friedhelm Mihm (Germany) Frank Lorenzo**	**Honda S2000**	**136**
31	SP3T	146	(Germany) Scuderia Colonia e.V. i. ADAC	(Germany) Matthias Wasel (Germany) Thomas Wasel (Liechtenstein) Johann Wanger (Germany) Michael Hess	Volkswagen Golf	136
32	SP10 GT4	120	(Germany) Black Falcon	(Ukraine) Andrii Lebed (Germany) Kai Riebetz (Germany) "Bona Ventura" (Germany) Alexander Böhm	BMW M3 GT4	134
33	SP7	37	(Sweden) Porsche Center Boras	(Sweden) Christer Pernvall (Sweden) Cleas Lund (Sweden) Hans Andreasson (Sweden) Patrik Ljunggren	Porsche 996 GT3 Cup	134
34	SP8	7		(Germany) Dr. Ulrich Bez (Germany) Wolfgang Schuhbauer (Hong Kong) Matthew Marsh (United Kingdom) Chris Porritt	Aston Martin Rapide	134
35	SP3T	184		(Germany) Mike Jäger (Germany) Christian Bollrath (Germany) Harald Hennes (Germany) Marcus Löhnert	Audi A3	133
36	SP3T	139	(Germany) RWS Motorsport	(Germany) Stefan Wieninger (Germany) Georg Niederberger (Germany) Benjamin Weidner (Germany) Florian Huber	Seat Leon Supercopa	132
**37**	**V5**	**219**		**(Germany) Stefan Widensohler (Germany) Nils Reimer (Germany) Reinhold Renger (Austria) Hari Proczyk**	**BMW M3 E36**	**132**
38	SP3T	148		(United Kingdom) Peter Venn (United Kingdom) Mike Rimmer (Australia) Mal Rose	Subaru Impreza	132
39	SP8	6		(United Kingdom) Chris Porritt (United Kingdom) Richard Meaden (Germany) Oliver Mathai (United Kingdom) Peter Cate	Aston Martin V12 Vantage	132
40	V5	226		(Germany) Werner Gusenbauer (Germany) Andreas Herwerth (Germany) Rainer Kathan (Germany) Ingo Tepel	BMW M3	131
41	SP10 GT4	63		(Germany) Tobias Guttroff (Germany) Jens Richter (Germany) Arno Klasen (Germany) Christian Hohenadel	Chevrolet Corvette C6 GT4	131
42	SP8T	82	(Germany) Dörr Motorsport GmbH	(Germany) Tom Moran (Germany) Sebastian Schneider (Germany) Michael Funke (Austria) Bernhard Wagner	BMW 135i	131
**43**	**V6**	**232**		**(Germany) Sven Rau (Germany) Nils Bartels (Germany) Joachim Kiesch**	**BMW M3 E46**	**131**
44	SP3	162	(Germany) Kissling Motorsport	(Germany) Heinz-Otto Fritzsche (Germany) Jürgen Fritzsche (Finland) Hannu Luostarinen (Finland) Julius Nieminen	Opel Astra GTC	131
45	V5	180	(Germany) Black Falcon	(Russia) Oleg Volin (Russia) Evgeny Vertunov (Germany) Philipp Leisen (Germany) Carsten Knechtges	BMW Z4 3.0 Si	131
46	SP10 GT4	59	(Switzerland) Gentle Swiss Racing	(Luxembourg) Joe Schmitz (Germany) Marcel Belke (Netherlands) Einar Thorsen (Liechtenstein) Martin Wachter	Aston Martin Vantage N24	130
47	SP6	90	(Germany) MSC Rhön e.V. i. AvD	(France) Pierre de Thoisy (France) Therry Depoix (France) Philippe Haezebrouck	BMW M3 E46	130
48	V5	223	(Germany) Scuderia Augustusburg Brühl e.V. i. ADAC	(Germany) Dieter Weidenbrück (Germany) Dr. Guido Wegner (Germany) Winfried Bernartz (Germany) Ralf Reinolsmann	BMW Z4 E85	130
49	SP3	183		(Germany) Janik Olivo (Germany) Elmar Jurek (Germany) Traudl Klink	Renault Clio III Cup	128
**50**	**D1T**	**201**	**(France) Peugeot Deutschland**	**(Germany) Jürgen Nett (Germany) Joey Kelly (Germany) Michael Bohrer (Germany) Henning Klipp**	**Peugeot RCZ**	**128**
51	AT	118	(Germany) Volkswagen Motorsport	(Sweden) Jimmy Johansson (Germany) Florian Gruber (Denmark) Nicki Thiim (Germany) Peter Terting	Volkswagen Scirocco GT24-CNG	128
**52**	**V4**	**213**	**(Germany) MSC Ruhr Blitz Bochum e.V.**	**(Germany) Roland Botor (Germany) Michael Eichhorn (Germany) Frank Aust**	**BMW 325i**	**128**
**53**	**SP4T**	**122**		**(Germany) Patrick Brenndörfer (Germany) Martin Müller (Germany) Frank Eickholt**	**Volvo C30 T5**	**128**
54	SP3	151	(Germany) MSC Adenau e.V.	(Germany) Karl-Heinz Teichmann (Germany) Michael Schneider (Germany) Lutz Rühl (Germany) Frank-Dieter Lohmann	Renault Clio Cup	128
55	SP9 GT3	23		(Germany) Stefan Kohlstrung (Germany) Alexander Plenagl (Germany) Klaus Koch (Germany) Christian Ried	Porsche 997 GT3 Cup	127
56	SP6	86		(Germany) Heinz Schmersal (Germany) Stephan Rösler (Germany) Christoph Koslowski (Germany) Christopher Haase	BMW Z4 M Coupé	127
57	SP6	87		(Germany) Tobias Schulze (Germany) Michael Schulze (Germany) Meik Utsch (Germany) Sven Landgraf	Nissan 350Z	127
58	V5	224	(Germany) ADAC Ostwestfalen-Lippe e.V.	(Germany) Dominik Thiemann (Sweden) Allan Runnegard (Germany) Thomas Frank (Germany) Thomas Ahles	BMW M3 E36	127
59	SP8	72	(Japan) Team World Car Awards	(Japan) Kazunori Yamauchi (Japan) Hideshi Matsuda (United Kingdom) Peter Lyon (United Kingdom) Owen Mildenhall	Lexus IS F	127
60	V4	214	(Germany) Team AutoArenA Motorsport	(Germany) Frank Hempel (Germany) Hannes Pfledderer (Germany) Günther Stecher (Germany) Werner Gusenbauer	Mercedes-Benz C 230	126
**61**	**V2**	**205**		**(Germany) Michael Jestädt** **(Germany) Rolf Derscheid** **(Germany) Michael Flehmer** **(Germany) Werner Schlehecker**	**BMW 318is**	**125**
62	V5	218	(Germany) MSC Ruhr-Blitz-Bochum e.V.	(Germany) Jörn Heuberg (Germany) Jan Heiler (Germany) Michael Eichhorn	BMW 130i	125
63	V6	237		(Germany) Mario Ketterer (Germany) Michael Heimrich (Germany) Bernd Jung (Germany) David Ackermann	BMW M3 E46	125
64	SP4T	125	(Germany) Pro Handicap e.V.	(Germany) Wolfgang Müller (France) Oliver Rudolph	Audi TTS	125
**65**	**V3**	**211**	**(Germany) Bonk Motorsport**	**(Germany) Axel Burghardt** **(Germany) Andreas Möntmann** **(Germany) Jens Moetefindt** **(Germany) Peter Bonk**	**BMW 320si**	**125**
66	SP3	167	(Germany) Road Runner Racing	(Italy) Marco Biancardi (Germany) Eckhard Geulen (Germany) Armin Holz (Germany) "Rennsemmel"	Renault Clio Cup	125
67	D1T	175		(Germany) Jörg Kirsten (Germany) Achim Walter (Germany) Max Delestau	Alfa Romeo 147 JTD	125
68	SP3	164	(Germany) Fleper Motorsport	(Russia) Sergey Metveev (Germany) Herbert von Danwitz (Germany) Michael Brüggenkamp (Japan) Hisanao Kurata	Renault Clio RS	125
69	SP5	113		(Germany) Klaus Werner (Germany) Giacomo Leopardi (Germany) Ingo Zabel (Germany) Jochen Hudelmaier	BMW 130i	125
70	V6	236	(Germany) Team DMV e.V.	(Switzerland) Ivan Jacoma (Switzerland) Dr. Nicola Bravetti (Switzerland) Matteo Cassina (Germany) André Krumbach	Porsche Cayman S	125
71	SP4T	126		(Germany) Stephan Wölflick (Germany) Urs Bressan (Germany) Jürgen Gagstatter (Germany) Dr. Jens Ludmann	Ford Mondeo	125
72	AT	116	(Germany) Volkswagen Motorsport	(Germany) Dr. Ulrich Hackenberg (Germany) Prof. Dr. Stefan Gies (Germany) Bernd Ostmann (Switzerland) Peter Wyss	Volkswagen Scirocco GT24-CNG	124
73	V6	235	(Germany) MSC Rhön e.V. im AvD	(Austria) Günther Spindler (Austria) Richard Purtscher (Austria) Kurt Fournier (Austria) Konrad Fuchsberger	BMW M3 E46	124
74	V4	212		(Austria) Gerald Fischer (Germany) Stephan Lipp (Austria) Michael Hollerweger	BMW 325i	123
75	V6	233		(Germany) Eugen Sing (Germany) Friedhelm Mihm (Germany) Thomas Heinrich (Germany) Bertin Sing	Mercedes-Benz SLK 350	123
76	SP5	80	(Germany) Live-Strip.com Racing	(Germany) Fabian Plentz (Germany) Kristian Nägele (Germany) Dennis Nägele (Germany) Rudi Seher	BMW 330i	123
77	V2	206	(Germany) Bonk Motorsport	(Germany) "Wolf Silvester" (Germany) Peter Bonk (Germany) Michael Bonk (Germany) Joe Kramer	BMW 318is	123
78	SP10 GT4	60	(Germany) Mathol Racing	(Germany) Eberhard Baunach (Germany) Oliver Louisoder (Switzerland) Heiko Ostmann (Germany) Chris Bauer	Aston Martin Vantage N24	122
79	D1T	200	(France) Peugeot Deutschland	(France) Jean-Philippe Peugeot (France) Stephane Caillet (France) Cyrus Ayari (France) Olivier Perez	Peugeot RCZ	122
80	SP3T	119	(Germany) MSC Adenau e.V.	(Sweden) Anders Carlsson (Sweden) Jonas Carlsson (Sweden) John Bergström	SEAT León Supercopa	121
81	SP3T	135	(Germany) König Komfort- und Rennsitze GmbH	(Germany) Rudi Speich (Germany) Roland Waschkau (Germany) Rolf Weißenfels (Germany) Friedhelm Erlebach	Audi A3	121
**82**	**N2**	**244**		**(New Zealand) Brian McGovern** **(New Zealand) Mathew Noonan** **(New Zealand) Greg Spark** **(New Zealand) Nicholas Chester**	**Honda Civic Type R**	**120**
83	N2	243		**(New Zealand)** Rod Hicks **(New Zealand)** David Glasson **(New Zealand)** Peter Milliner **(New Zealand)** Mark Corbett	Honda Civic Type R	120
84	SP8	74	(Switzerland) Gentle Swiss Racing	(Switzerland) Fredy Barth (Italy) Luca Moro (Germany) Matthias Hoffsümmer	Aston Martin Vantage N24	120
85	SP7	41		(Germany) Peter Schmidt (Switzerland) Marcel Blumer (Switzerland) Dieter Lehner (Germany) Alexander Mattschull	Porsche 997 GT3 Cup	120
86	SP3	155	(Germany) Mathol Racing	(Germany) Walter Nawotka (United States) Jim Briody (Germany) Michael Prym (Germany) Charlotte Wilking	Honda Civic Type R	120
87	V4	215	(Germany) Automobilclub von Deutschland	(Germany) Torsten Kratz (Germany) Andreas Schettler (Austria) Erich Trinkl Ilias Delavina	BMW 325i	119
**88**	**D3T**	**193**	**(Germany) RG Bergisch Gladbach e.V. im ADAC**	**(Germany) Thomas Haider** **(Germany) Rainer Kutsch** **(Germany) Joachim Schulz** **(Germany) Gregor Hötzel**	**BMW 330d**	**119**
89	N2	246		**(Norway)** Ola Setsaas **(Norway)** Jörgen Pettersen **(Norway)** Roger Sandberg **(Norway)** Erik Steinbraten	Honda Civic Type R	119
90	V5	220		**(Germany)** Reinhard Huber **(Germany)** Christoph Rendlen **(Germany)** Philipp Neuffer **(Italy)** Carlo Babini Merlo	BMW Z4 M Coupe	118
91	V5	225		(Australia) Richard Gartner (Australia) Ray Stubber (Australia) Paul Stubber	BMW M3 E36	118
92	SP8	49		**(Germany)** Alexander Krebs **(Germany)** Chris Vogler **(Germany)** Dierk Möller-Sonntag **(Germany)** Guido Naumann	Audi R8	117
93	SP3	153		**(Germany)** Alexander Herrmann **(Germany)** Achim Herrmann **(Netherlands)** Han Hoendervangers	Volkswagen Golf III Kit Car	115
94	D1T	176	(Germany) Dörr Motorsport GmbH	(Germany) Friedrich Holoch (Germany) Christian Penno (Germany) Roland Konrad (Germany) Rainer Dörr	BMW 120d	115
95	SP4T	127	(Germany) König Komfort- und Rennsitze GmbH	(Germany) Uwe Reich (Germany) Marc-Uwe von Niesewand (Germany) Michael Lachmayer (Germany) Christian Kosbu	Ford Focus ST	114
**96**	**SP4**	**129**	**(Germany) Bergischer Motor-Club e.V. im ADAC**	**(Argentina) Oscar Fineschi** **(Argentina) Juan José Garriz** **(Argentina) Juan Angel Cusano** **(Argentina) Sergio Rodríguez**	**BMW 325i E92**	**114**
97	D1T	75	(Germany) Need for Speed by Schubert Motorsport	(Norway) Anders Buchardt (Norway) Nils Tronrud (Sweden) Lars Stugemo (Sweden) Magnus Öhman	BMW 320d	114
98	V5	227	(Germany) Automobilclub von Deutschland	(Germany) Gerd Niemeyer (Germany) Dr. Armin Zumtobel (Japan) Hitoshi Goto (Japan) Masaharu Kimura	BMW M3 GT	113
99	SP10 GT4	55	(Germany) Boes Motorsport	(Germany) Torsten Kornmeyer (Germany) Dirk Kornmeyer (Germany) Hendrik Still	Ginetta G50 GT4	112
100	SP3	157		(Germany) Torsten Platz (Germany) Steffen Wethmar (Luxembourg) Charles Kauffman (Austria) Dieter Svepes	Honda S2000	111
101	SP3	152		(Germany) Frank Kuhlmann (Germany) Dino Drößiger (Germany) Mark Giesbrecht (United States) Bruce Trenery	Honda Civic Type R	111
102	SP8	79	(Germany) Derichs Rennwagen e.V.	(Austria) Manfred Kubik (United Kingdom) Keith Ahlers (Germany) Erwin Derichs (Germany) "Don Stephano"	Audi A8 W12	111
103	SP4T	128		(Germany) Christian Steffens (Australia) Martin Bailey (Australia) Mike Reedy (Australia) Kean Booker	Volvo S60 Turbo	110
104	SP8	78	(Germany) Derichs Rennwagen e.V.	(Austria) Manfred Kubik (United Kingdom) Keith Ahlers (Germany) Erwin Derichs (Germany) "Don Stephano"	Audi V8	110
105	V3	208		(Germany) Erik Heim (Denmark) Claus Grønning (Denmark) Holger Knudsen (Italy) Mauro Simoncini	Opel Astra OPC	109
106	SP3	161		(France) Fabrice Reicher (Germany) Rene Wolff (Switzerland) Pascal Engel (Germany) Harald Rettich	Peugeot 206 RCC	109
107	SP9 GT3	17	(Germany) Team DMV e.V.	(Germany) André Krumbach (Germany) Holger Fuchs (Germany) Harald Schlotter (Germany) Giuseppe Timperanza	Porsche 997 GT3 Cup	108
108	N2	245		(France) Gérard Tremblay (France) Philippe Burel (France) Jean Marc Rivet (France) Dominique Nury	Honda Integra	106
109	SP3T	140	(Germany) Mathol Racing	(Germany) Jörg Kittelmann (Germany) Dr. Jörg Wilhelm (Germany) Klaus-Dieter Müller (Germany) Manfred Volk	SEAT León Supercopa	104
110	SP4T	250	(Germany) FH Köln Motorsport powered by Ford	(Finland) Jari-Matti Latvala (Germany) Anja Wassertheurer (Germany) Daniela Schmid (Germany) Stefan Schlesack	Ford Focus RS	103
111	SP3	154		(Germany) Andreas Dingert (Germany) Eric Freichels (Germany) Sven Kurtenbach (Germany) Werner Mohr	Volkswagen Golf III Kit Car	102
112	SP3T	150	(Germany) Fleper Motorsport	(Germany) Dr. Joachim Steidel (Germany) Thorsten Wolter (Germany) Herwarth Wartenberg (Switzerland) Walter Kaufmann	Peugeot 207 RC	100
113	SP3	165	(Germany) Schläppi Race-Tec GmbH	(Switzerland) Nicolas Abril (Sweden) Stig Näs (Germany) Holger Goedicke (Switzerland) Mathias Schläppi	Renault Clio Cup	98
114	SP3T	138		(Germany) Ingo Gaupp (Germany) Manuel Brinkmann (Germany) Andy Glanc	Mini Cooper S	94
115	SP7	64	(United Kingdom) RJN Motorsport	(Germany) Holger Eckhardt (Germany) Andreas Gülden (Germany) Michael Krumm (United Kingdom) Alex Buncombe	Nissan 370Z GT4	92
116	D3T	190		(Argentina) José Manuel Balbiani (Argentina) Adrián Santos (Argentina) José Visir (Argentina) Gustavo Fontana	BMW 335d GTR	91
117	V4	170	(Germany) Black Falcon	(Germany) Jörg Krell (Germany) Sebastian Krell (Germany) Thomas Mundorf (Germany) Holger Zulauf	BMW 325i	90
118	D3T	195		(Germany) Thomas Hanisch (Germany) Hans Keutmann (Germany) Klaus Leinfelder (United States) Spencer Trenery	Audi A4 quattro	89
119	N2	242	(Belgium) East Belgian Racing Team	(Belgium) Jacky Delvaux (Belgium) René Marin (Belgium) Bruno Beulen	Renault Clio RS	88
120	SP3	168	(Germany) Team DMV	(Germany) Hans-Christoph Schäfer (Germany) Marcus Bulgrin (Germany) Dr. Michael Albertz (Germany) Dietmar Henke	SEAT Ibiza	86
121	SP3	159	(Germany) ADAC Berlin Brandenburg e.V.	(Germany) Robert Schröder (Germany) Maik Kraske (Germany) Dr. Peter Lührs (Germany) Dominic Liedtke	Volkswagen Golf III 16V	84
122	V2	204		(Germany) Andreas Schwarz (Germany) Christian Sporenberg (Germany) Christian Wack (Germany) Michael Holz	BMW 318is	80
123	SP5	107		(Germany) Patrick Rehs (Germany) Markus Schaufuss (Germany) Sascha Rehs (Germany) Konstantin Wolf	BMW 130i GTR	79
NC	SP8	66		(Germany) Tim Schrick (Germany) Patrick Bernhardt (Germany) Ralf Goral (Germany) Wolfgang Weber	Aston Martin Vantage N24	75
NC	V3	210		(Germany) Ralph Caba (Germany) Volker Lange (Germany) Oliver Sprungmann (Germany) Carsten Foese	Ford Fiesta ST	73
NC	SP8	51	(Japan) Gazoo Racing	(Germany) Jochen Krumbach (Germany) Armin Hahne (Germany) André Lotterer	Lexus LF-A	67
NC	SP8	68		(Andorra) "Ed Nicelife" (Germany) Thomas Koll (Germany) Harry Ley (Germany) Patrick Kentenich	Chevrolet Corvette C6	64
NC	V3	207		(Germany) Thomas Lennackers (Germany) Michael Auert (Germany) Eberhard Schneider (Denmark) Michael Juul	Opel Astra OPC	60
NC	D3T	194	(Germany) Dörr Motorsport GmbH	(Germany) Kristian Vetter (Germany) Heiko Hahn (Germany) Simon Englerth (Germany) Frank Weishar	BMW 135d	52
NC	D1T	173		(Germany) Bernd Kleeschulte (Germany) Douglas Allen (Germany) Valentin Hummel (Germany) Paul-Martin Dose	BMW 320 Rapsöl	52
NC	SP6	84		(United Kingdom) Guy Povey (United Kingdom) Clint Bardwell (United Kingdom) Hamish Irvine (United Kingdom) John Irvine	BMW M3	41
NC	D1T	182		(Netherlands) Ivo Breukers (Netherlands) Henk Thijssen (Netherlands) Ton Verkoelen	Seat León TDi	37
NC	AT	58		Titus Dittmann Julius Dittmann Dag A. van Garrel Viktor Smolski		30

== Bibliography ==
- Jörg-Richard Ufer & Tim Upietz. 24 Stunden Nürburgring Nordschleife 2010 (in German). Gruppe C Motorsport Verlag. ISBN 978-3-928540-60-5.
