= Aston Martin Asia Cup =

- Category: One-make racing by Aston Martin
- Country: Asia
- Inaugural season: 2008
- Folded: 2009
- Constructors: Aston Martin
- Tyre suppliers: Michelin

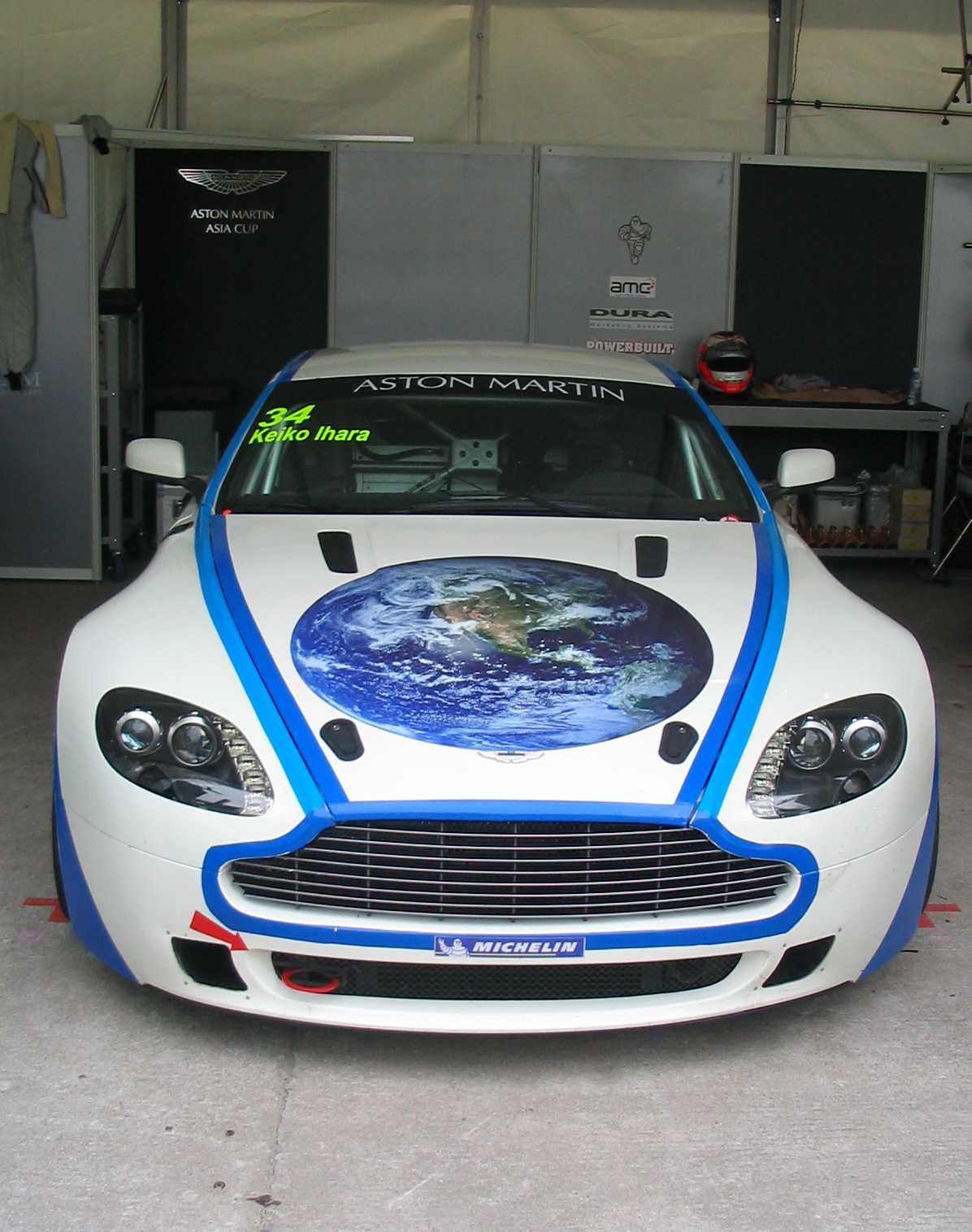
The Aston Martin V8 Vantage N24 of Keiko Ihara at Zhuhai International Circuit, waiting to race in the Aston Martin Asia Cup race.

The Aston Martin Asia Cup (AMAC) was the world's first ever Aston Martin one make series. All drivers competed for the AMAC title in identical Aston Martin V8 Vantage N24 race cars.

The series started in 2008 and consisted of 10 races throughout the Asia Pacific region including China, Japan, Malaysia and Singapore. Each race featured a grid of 15 Aston Martin Vantage N24s, a 4.3 L (0.95 imp gal; 1.1 US gal) race-developed evolution of the V8 Vantage.

The AMAC included a variety of 30-minute sprint races and longer endurance races, some of which supported Formula One events in the region, like the Singapore Grand Prix and the Chinese Grand Prix.

== Race car ==
The V8 Vantage N24 had a V8 engine producing 410 bhp (310 kW) and weighed just 1,350 kg (2,980 lb). The 18 AMAC cars had the automated manual Sportshift transmission, and all the cars were equipped with roll cages, safety fuel tanks, race seats and harnesses, and fire extinguisher systems. The cars were serviced at the Aston Martin Beijing service facility at the city's Goldenport Park Circuit. Michelin was the sole tyre supplier.

== Prize ==
The Championship offered a fully sponsored season in a Vantage N24 in the 2009 GT4 European Cup for the winner.

== Circuits visited ==
- (China) Shanghai International Circuit (2008–2009)
- (Malaysia) Sepang International Circuit (2008–2009)
- (Singapore) Marina Bay Street Circuit (2008–2009)
- (China) Zhuhai International Circuit (2008)

== Series champions ==
Aston Martin Asia Cup Champions
| Year | Driver | Car |
|---|---|---|
| 2008 | (Japan) Kota Sasaki | Aston Martin V8 Vantage |

== See also ==
- Ferrari Challenge
- Lamborghini Super Trofeo
- Porsche Supercup
