= Aston Martin Vantage N24 =

Aston Martin N24
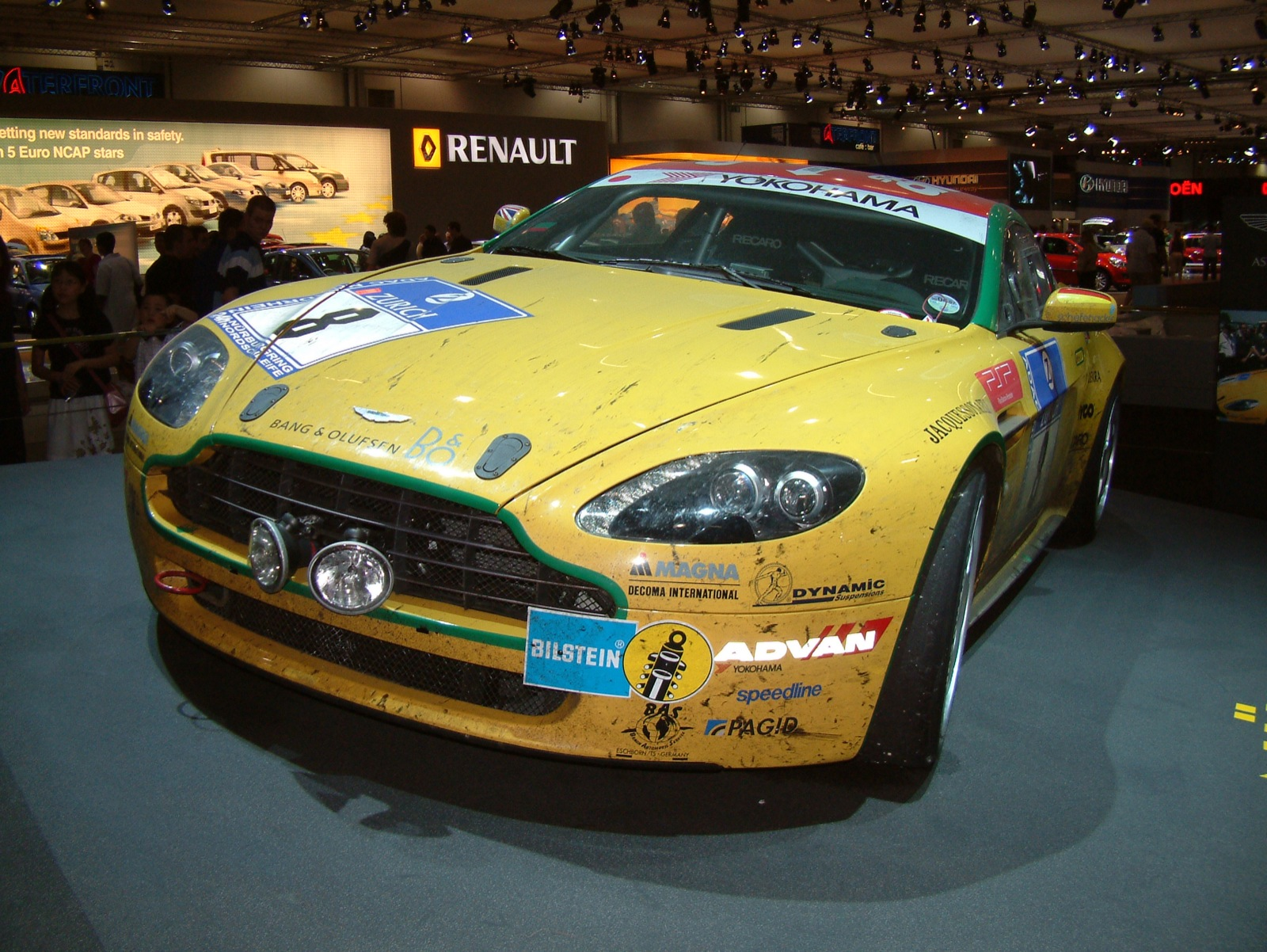
- An N24 on display after participating in the 24 Hours of Nürburgring
- Category: Sports car racing
- Constructor: Aston Martin Lagonda LTD
- Designer: Chris Porritt

Technical specifications
- Suspension (front): Eibach springs with separate helper springs and anti-roll bar
- Suspension (rear): Stiffened rear anti-roll bar
- Length: 4,380 mm (172.4 in)
- Width: 1,865 mm (73.4 in)
- Height: 1,210 mm (47.6 in)
- Axle track: Front 1,580 mm (62.2 in); Rear 1,590 mm (62.6 in)
- Wheelbase: 2,600 mm (102.4 in)
- Engine: Aston Martin 4,280 cc (4.3 L; 261.2 cu in), all aluminium, V8, 410 bhp (306 kW; 416 PS), 425 N⋅m (313 lb⋅ft), N/A FMR
- Transmission: 6-speed manual
- Weight: 1,330 kg (2,930 lb)
- Brakes: 4-piston calipers front and rear operating on steel floating disc brakes
- Tyres: Yokohama A048

Competition history

The Aston Martin Vantage N24 is a race car introduced by Aston Martin in 2006, based on the V8 Vantage road car. In late 2008, Aston Martin debuted an updated version of the N24, with the newer Aston Martin Vantage GT4, which featured a larger 4.7-litre engine.

== Development ==
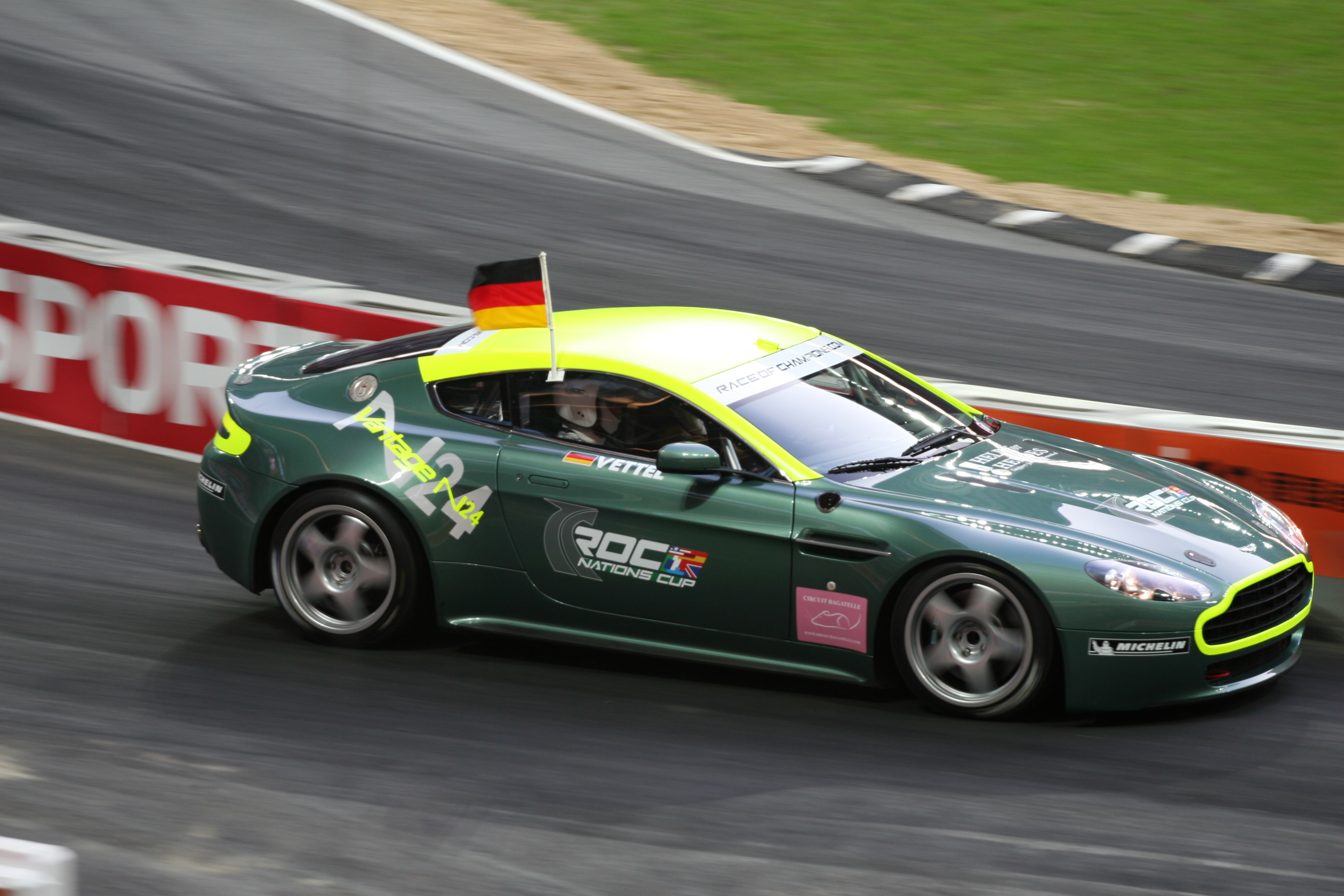
Sebastian Vettel racing an Aston Martin Vantage N24

During the 2006 British Motor Show in London, Aston Martin Racing revealed a near stock version of the V8 Vantage that would compete in the Nürburgring 24 Hours (N24) endurance race.

While essentially much like the existing V8 Vantage coupé, the N24 has a front splitter and extended door sills for aerodynamic efficiency, a full roll cage, a racing fuel tank, and other modifications necessary to make the car race worthy. Other modifications include the removal of most of the interior, including all seats, replaced by a lone Recaro drivers seat and polycarbonate windows which helped reduce weight by 250 kg (551 lb).

The brakes and suspension are also uprated, featuring enlarged front and rear anti-roll bars, adjustable dampers, modified subframe for increased camber and castor, cast magnesium wheels and racing brake pads.

The engine is a modified version of the road car's engine, including lightened and balanced internals, re-profiled cylinder heads and the engine management system tuned for race use. The engine would now produce 410 bhp (306 kW; 416 PS), 30 bhp (22 kW; 30 PS) more than the standard road car.

After the car was introduced, Aston Martin confirmed that they would offer the V8 Vantage N24 to customers as a track car similar to a Porsche 911 GT3 Cup. The V8 Vantage N24 is legal for use in the FIA GT4 European Cup, German VLN series, Grand-Am Cup, and various other national series. Contrary to Porsche however, Dr. Bez announced that they would not put a premium price on the N24 and that, while it was only produced in limited numbers, cost just about as much as a regular V8 Vantage. Aston Martin planned to build 24 cars to honor the Nürburgring 24h race but at all, they only built 15 cars with chassis number N240001 up to N240015 (N240013 was not built) and the prototype "Rose" at the special vehicle operation department in Gaydon.

The Vantage N24 was on sale with prices starting at approximately £78,720 excluding local taxes and delivery. This rose to £84,500 in 2007 for the standard car and £95,000 for FIA GT4 spec.

== Racing history ==
The Aston Martin V8 Vantage N24 first competed at the Nürburgring 24 Hours. Driven by Aston Martin CEO Dr. Ulrich Bez, development engineer Chris Porrit, development driver Wolfgang Schuhbauer and German journalist Horst Graf von Saurma-Jeltsch in the 24 hour race. The car finished 4th in class and 24th overall, before being driven home on public roads after the race.

The N24 was featured in the British TV series Top Gear and driven by James May in a quest to find the best road for driving in Europe. The decision to use the "racing version" for this kind of drive was mocked by Richard Hammond and Jeremy Clarkson as the car lacked air conditioning and other comforts. May eventually had to drive naked, while pouring bottles of cold water over himself.

Additional racing success for the V8 Vantage in N24 trim included a first and second at the 2007 European GT4 race at Silverstone, the first 3 places in their class for the 2 works N24 called "Kermit" and "Rose" and a private Team car chassis number N240011 called "Barry" at the 2008 Nurburgring 24 hours race (18th out of 220 cars entered overall), and strong showings in Bahrain (8th), VLN racing, and other tracks and events throughout the world. The N24 was also the basis of a one-make pan-Asia series called Aston Martin Asia Cup (AMAC). Competitors ran in identical N24s at various Asian circuits.
