= Aston Martin V12 Zagato =

Concept car and grand tourer

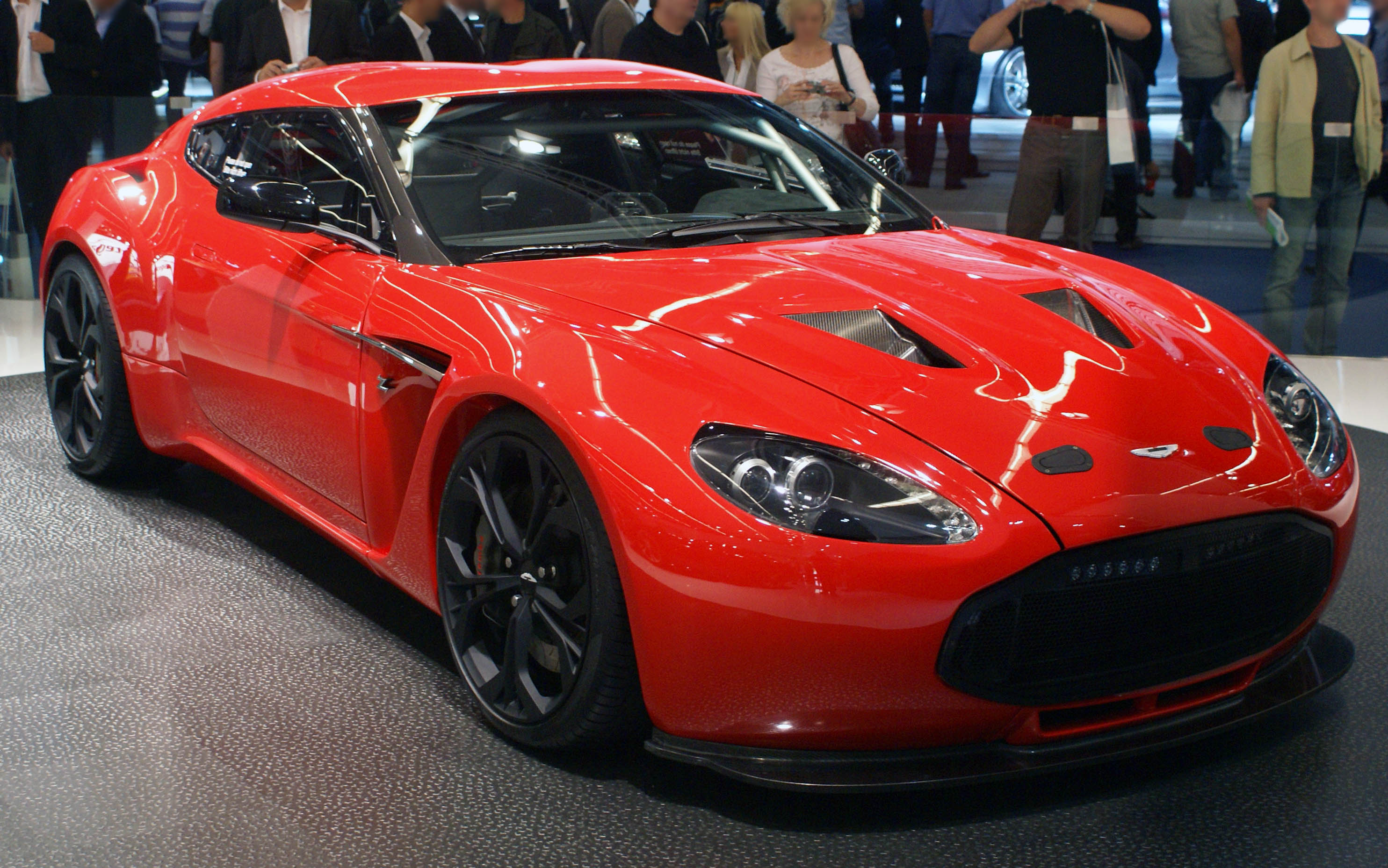
- Category: Grand tourer
- Constructor: Aston Martin; Zagato
- Designer: Marek Reichman

Technical specifications
- Chassis: Bonded aluminium chassis, aluminium body, steel roll cage
- Suspension (front): Independent double wishbone with fully adjustable Multimatic DSSV dampers
- Suspension (rear): Independent double wishbone with fully adjustable Multimatic DSSV dampers
- Length: 4,385 mm (173 in)
- Width: 1,865 mm (73 in)
- Height: 1,250 mm (49 in)
- Wheelbase: 2,600 mm (102 in)
- Engine: Aston Martin AM10 5935 cc V12, 10.9:1 Compression ratio, FR Layout
- Transmission: 6-speed manual
- Weight: 1,680 kg (3,704 lb)
- Fuel: Petrol
- Tyres: Yokohama

Competition history
- Notable entrants: (United Kingdom) Aston Martin Racing
- Notable drivers: (Germany) Ulrich Bez (United Kingdom) Marek Reichman (United Kingdom) Chris Porritt
- Debut: 53rd ADAC ACAS H&R-Cup VLN round at the Nürburgring
Races
6

The Aston Martin V12 Zagato is a British sports car/endurance racer made by Aston Martin in collaboration with Zagato to celebrate a fifty-year partnership since the Aston Martin DB4 GT Zagato. Introduced in Lake Como, Italy at the Concorso d'Eleganza Villa d'Este on 21 May 2011, the Zagato was awarded with the competition's "Design Award for Concept Cars and Prototypes" which has also been won by the One-77 in 2009. Zagato introduced the "Corsa" (race) version of the car in 2011 and the "Stradale" (road) version in 2012. The Stradale version does not have the black quick releases on the bonnet and boot that the Corsa has and the exhaust pipes of the Stradale version are further apart than on the Corsa version.

Like the Aston Martin V12 Vantage on which it is based, the V12 Zagato is powered by a 5.9-litre AM10 V12 engine which produces 510 bhp (380 kW; 517 PS), and 570 N⋅m (420 lb⋅ft) of torque.

== Design ==
Designed at the Aston Martin Design Studios in Gaydon, the chassis - engineered by a Chris Porritt-led team including veterans of Astons Martins's One-77 project - features a retuned version of the regular V12 Vantage's double-wishbone suspension. The design features a new handcrafted aluminium body with the front similar to the Vantage with differences in the roof and rear section. Another difference is the endurance racing fuel tank carrying up to 120 litres of fuel.

== Production ==
Following a large interest by customers, Aston Martin announced they would produce a homologated version of the car, producing only a limited run of 150 at the Aston Martin headquarters in Gaydon. Starting delivery in the second half of 2012, the Zagato was priced at around £330,000 excluding local taxes. In the end, orders did not materialize at the rate envisioned and only 61 cars were actually made.

=== Heritage Twins ===
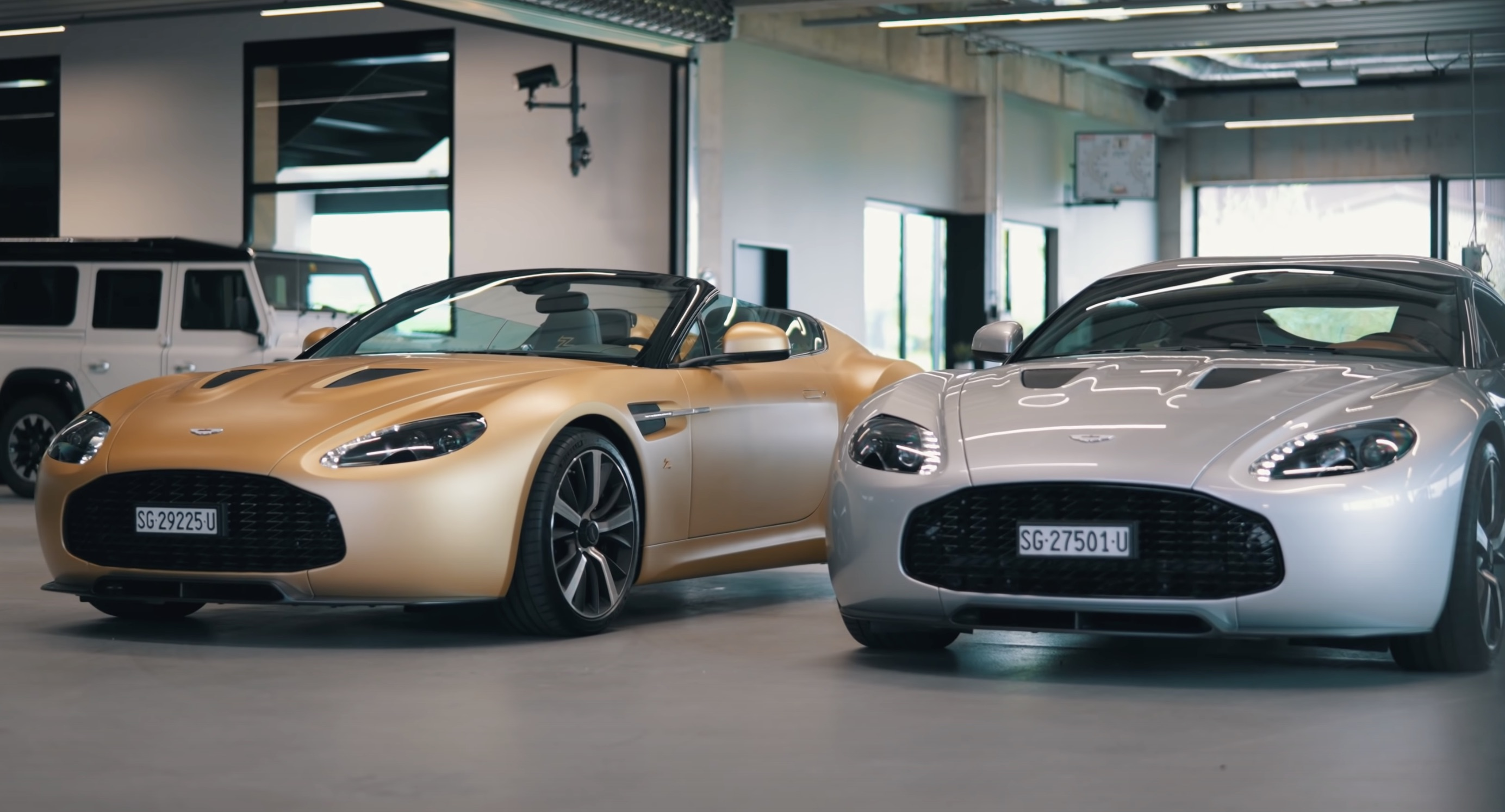

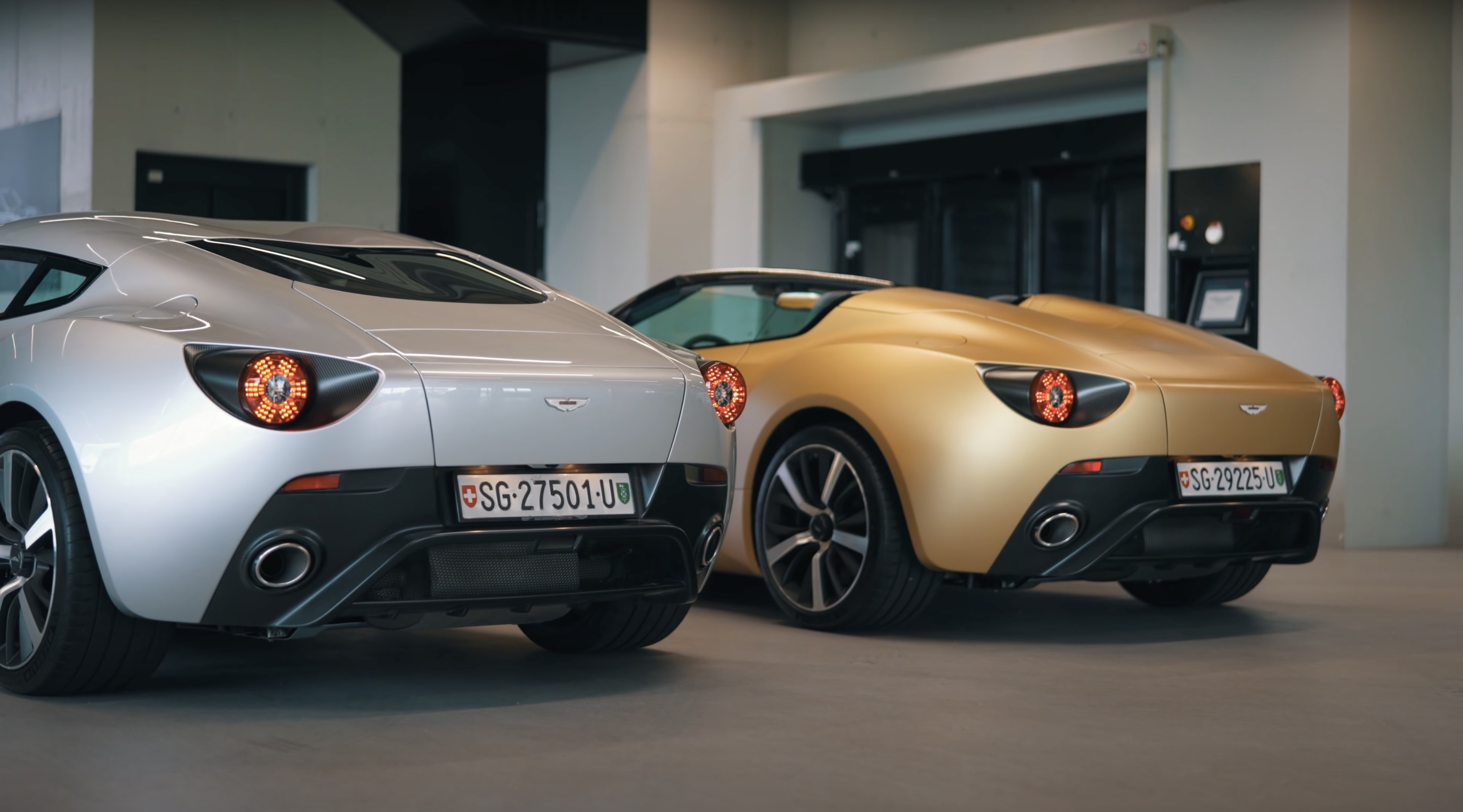
V12 Zagato Heritage Twins

In April 2020, it was publicly announced that Aston Martin had partnered with British company R-Reforged to produce 19 pairs of coupés and convertibles (38 cars in total). The cars gain center-locking 19-inch alloy wheels and a deployable rear wing over the original version. Power from the 5.9L V12 has been increased to 600 bhp. Customers can choose between an automatic transmission or a 7-speed manual.

== Racing history ==
=== 2011 ===
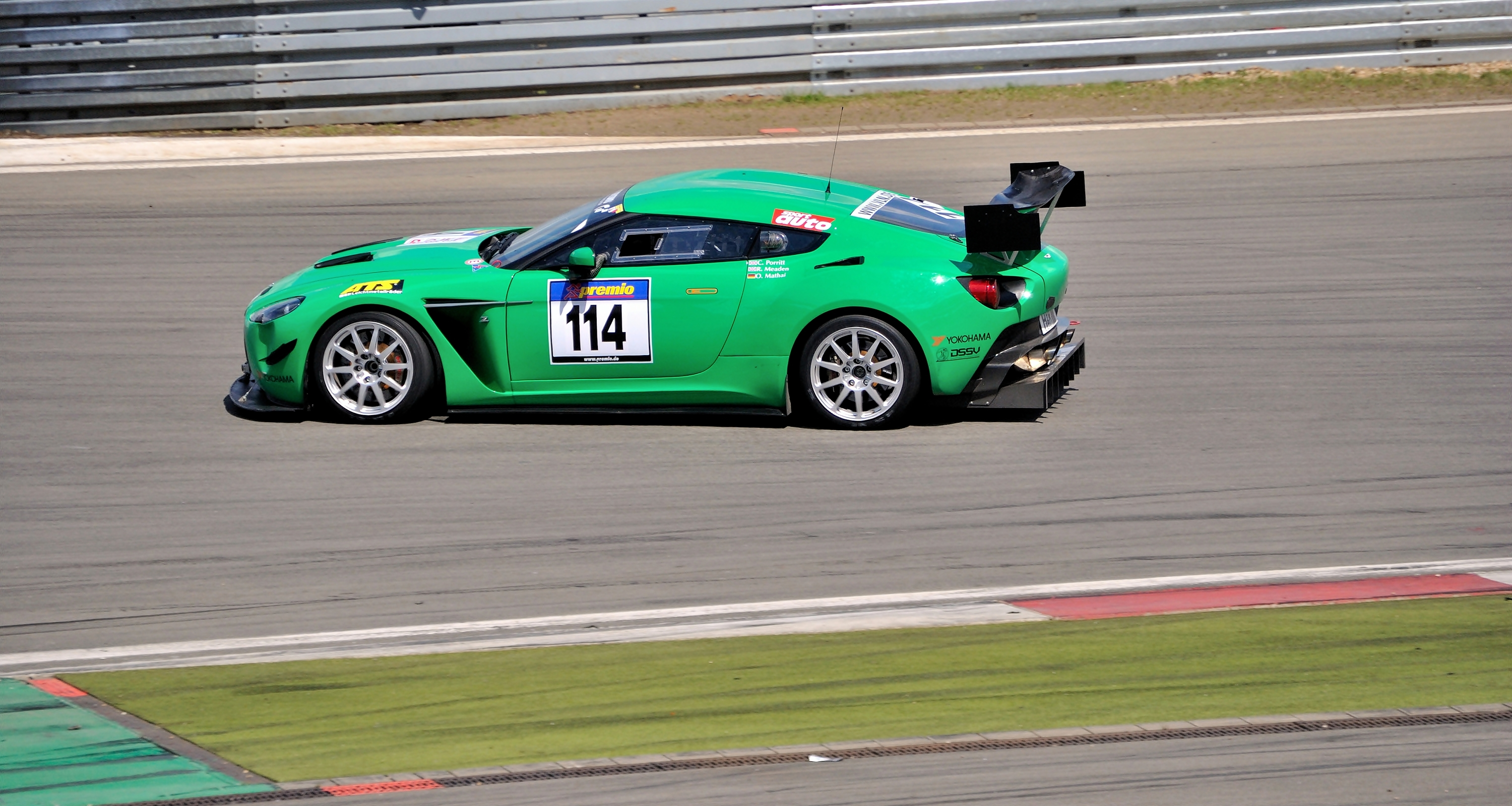
Aston Martin V12 Zagato 'Zig', at the 51st VLN, 2011

The Aston Martin V12 Zagato made its racing debut at the 53rd ADAC ACAS H&R-Cup VLN round at the Nürburgring on 28 May, the event for the car being a preparation and development experience ahead of the Nürburgring 24-hour race, to be held on 25–26 June.

Two V12 Zagatos competed in the 51st ADAC Reinoldus-Langstreckenrennen VLN four-hour race on 11 June. Again as a test session ahead of the Nürburgring 24-hour race. Aston Martin Chief Executive, Dr. Ulrich Bez lead the driver team joined by the company's Nürburgring Test Centre Director, Wolfgang Schuhbauer plus experienced amateur racer Peter Cate in the first of the two V12 Zagato's. The sister car was driven by One-77 Chief Engineer Chris Porritt, experienced sports car driver Oliver Mathai and automotive journalist Richard Meaden. Competing in the SP8 category, the V12 Zagatos; near production standard cars with only essential safety and aerodynamic modifications required for racing, took 2nd and 3rd place in class, equating to 15th and 39th overall in field of some 150 largely specialist cars.

The two V12 Zagatos affectionately nicknamed "Zig" (green car) and "Zag" (red car) competed in the 39th ADAC Nürburgring 24-hour race, held on 25–26 June. The two factory backed cars both completed the race, finishing 5th and 6th in the SP8 class.

"Zag" also raced at the 2011 Goodwood Festival of Speed on 1–3 July. Driven by Aston Martin head designer, Marek Reichman, "Zag" recorded a best time of 61.21 to finish 15th in the overall shootout.

On 17 October "Zig" was part of a collaboration between Aston Martin and Toyota at the VLN9 DMV 250-Meilen-Rennen. During the race drivers of both the V12 Zagato and Lexus LFA, which included the CEO of Aston Martin and President of Toyota, had an opportunity to drive both cars.

=== 2012 ===
'Zig' attended VLN3 as a test for the Nurburgring 24 hours, during which the car sustained a puncture on the first lap, however went on the finish the race without any further problems.

Previously running in green livery 'Zig' was re-painted Gulf blue and black for the Nurburgring 24hours to match its GT3 teammates. The car had an excellent race and ran faultlessly throughout driven by Aston Martin CEO Dr Ulrich Bez (D), chief engineer Chris Porritt (GB), Nürburgring Test Centre Director Wolfgang Schuhbauer (D) and journalist Richard Meaden (GB) and finished 26th overall and 2nd in class.

The same car also attended the Aston Martin Le Mans Festival, a support race for the Le Mans 24 hours. During the first stint had battled up to an impressive fourth position, having started from tenth, before handing over to his teammate Dr Ulrich Bez.

== Gallery ==
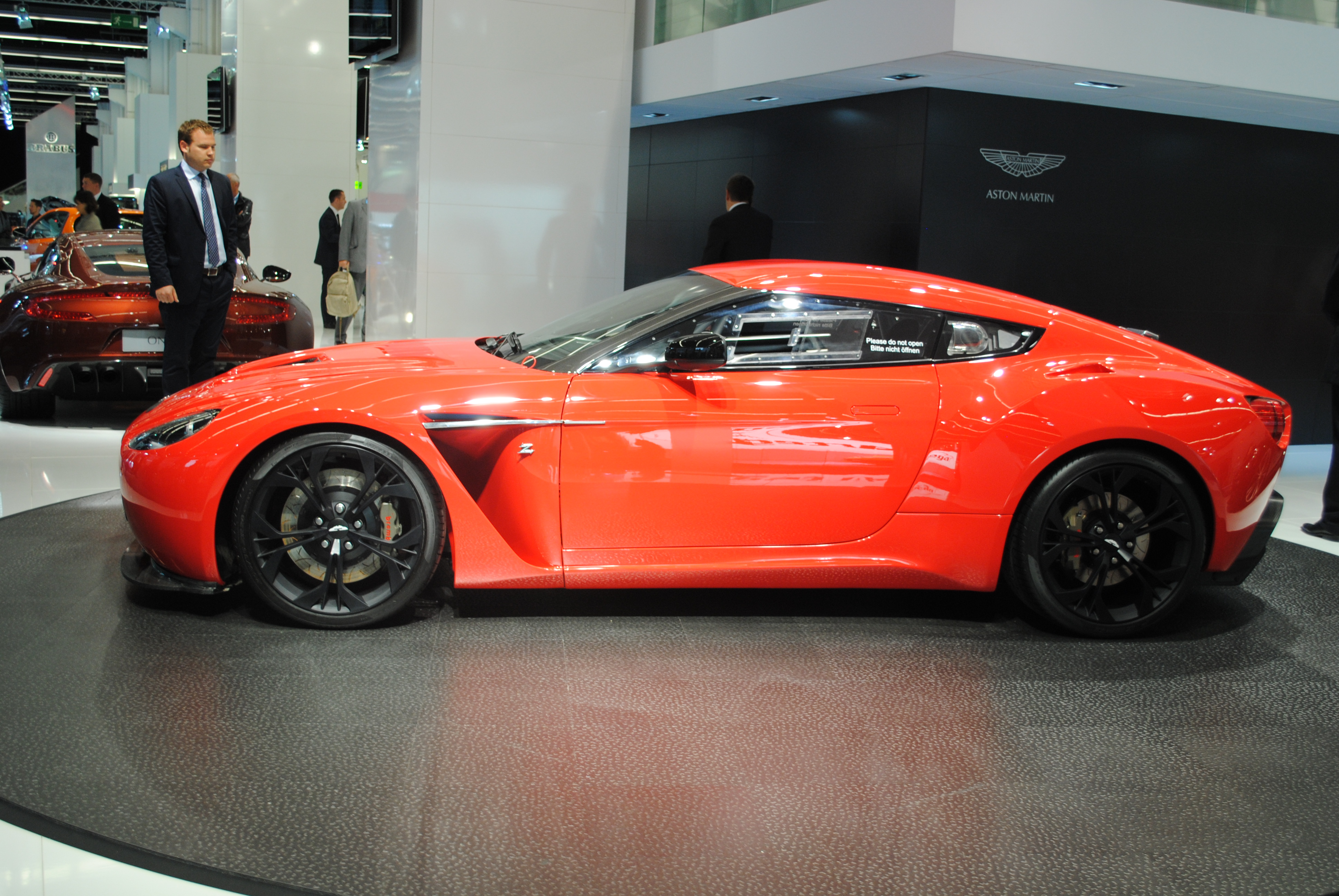
2011 Aston Martin V12 Corsa Zagato

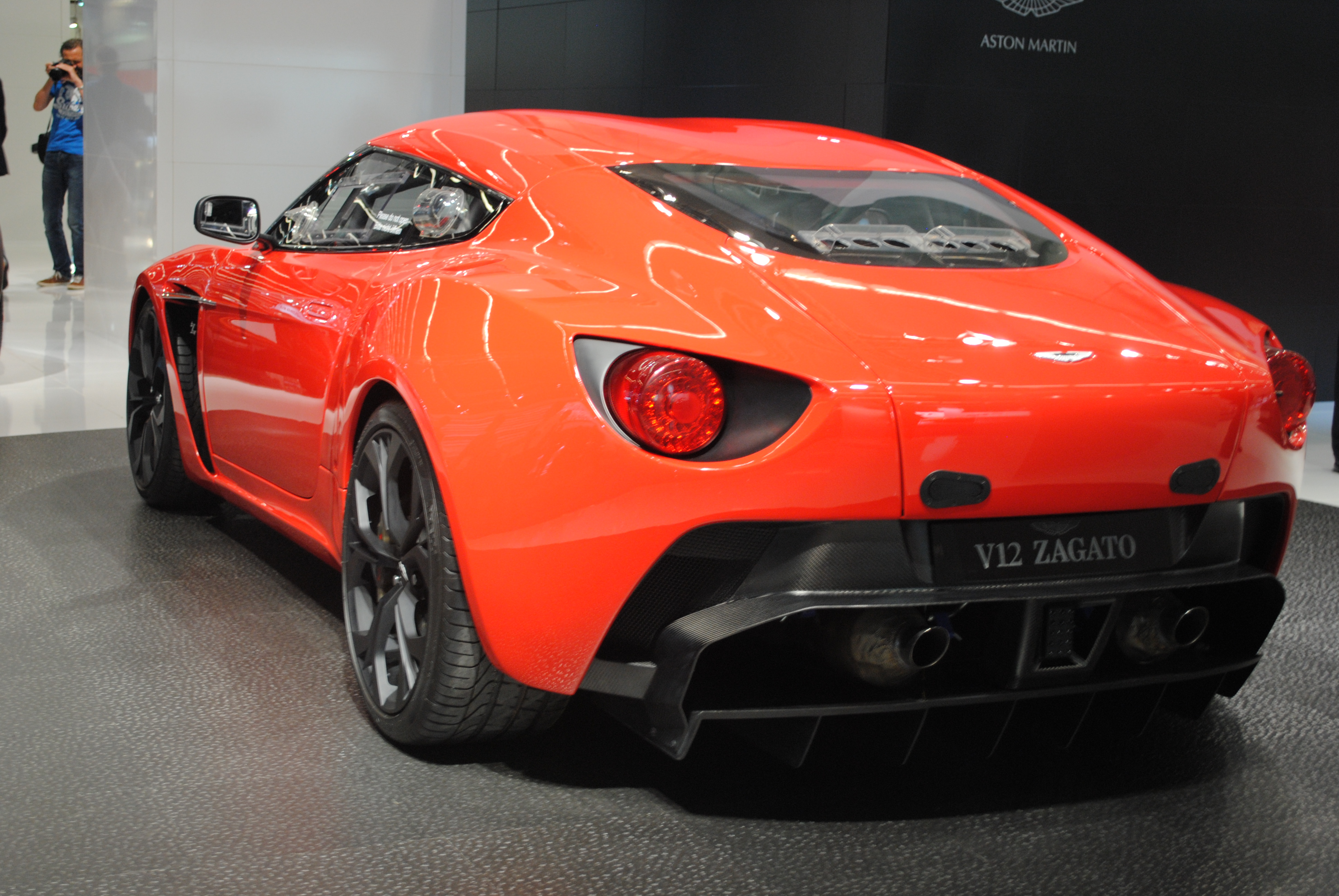
Corsa; rear 3/4 view

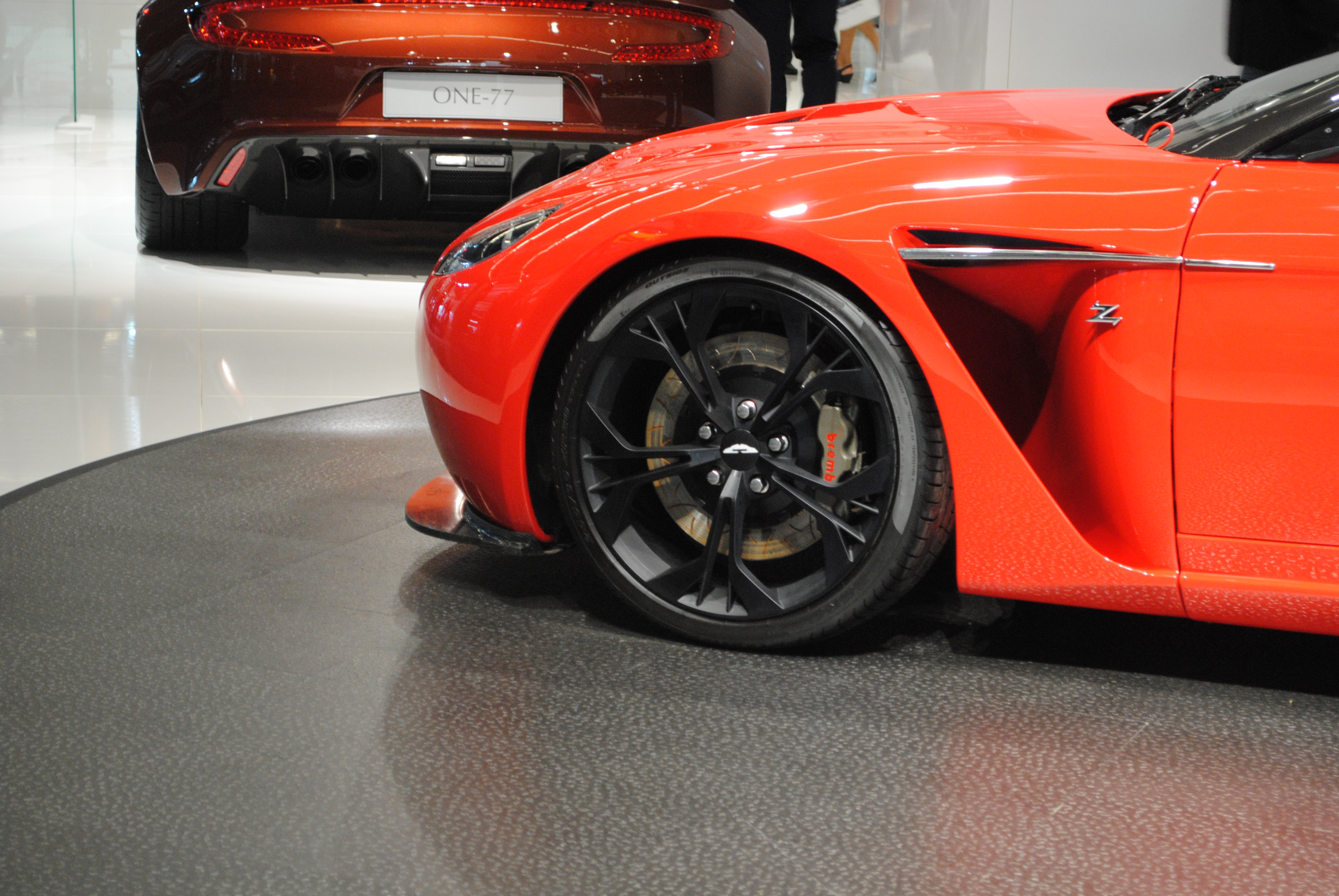
Corsa; detail

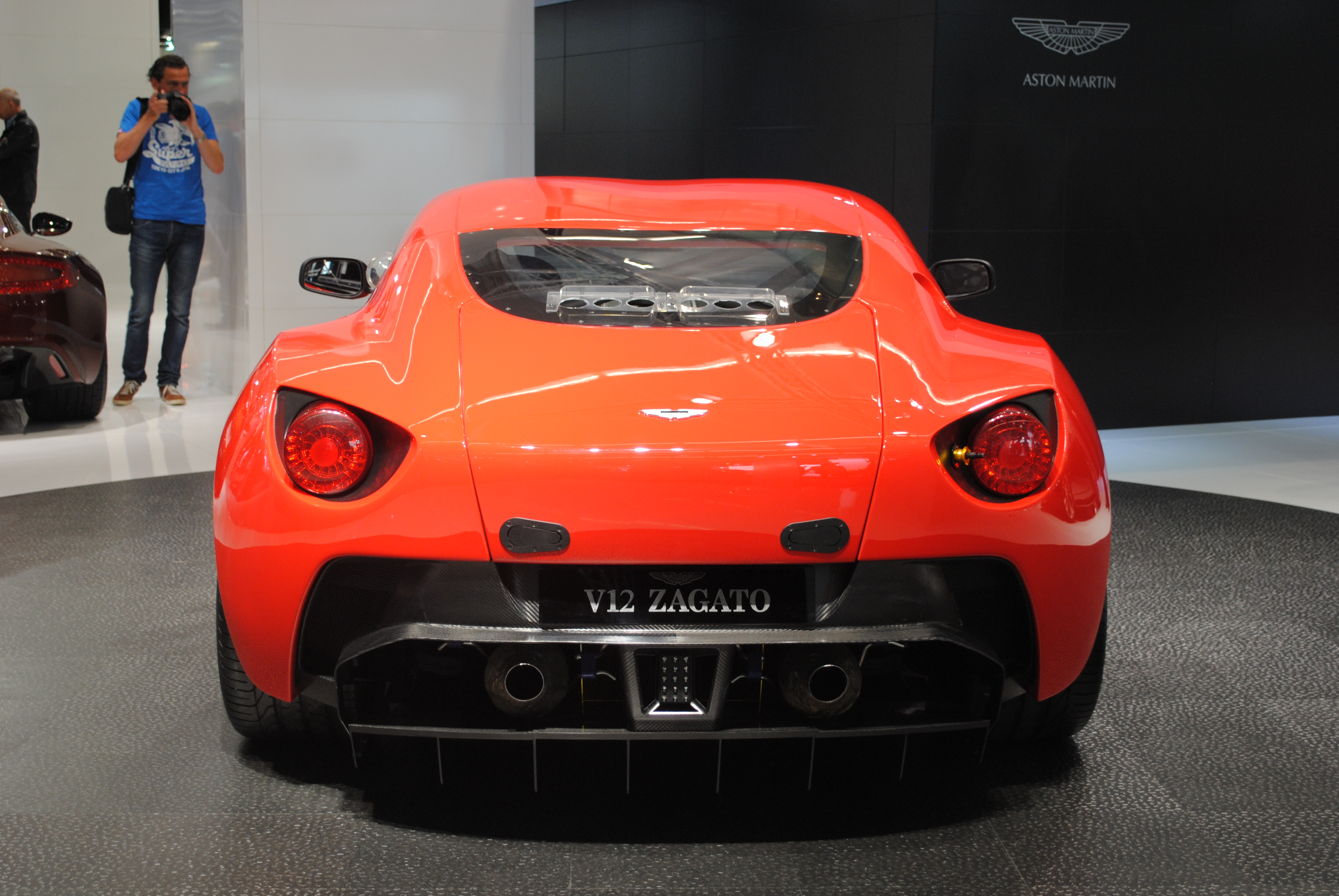
Corsa; rear view

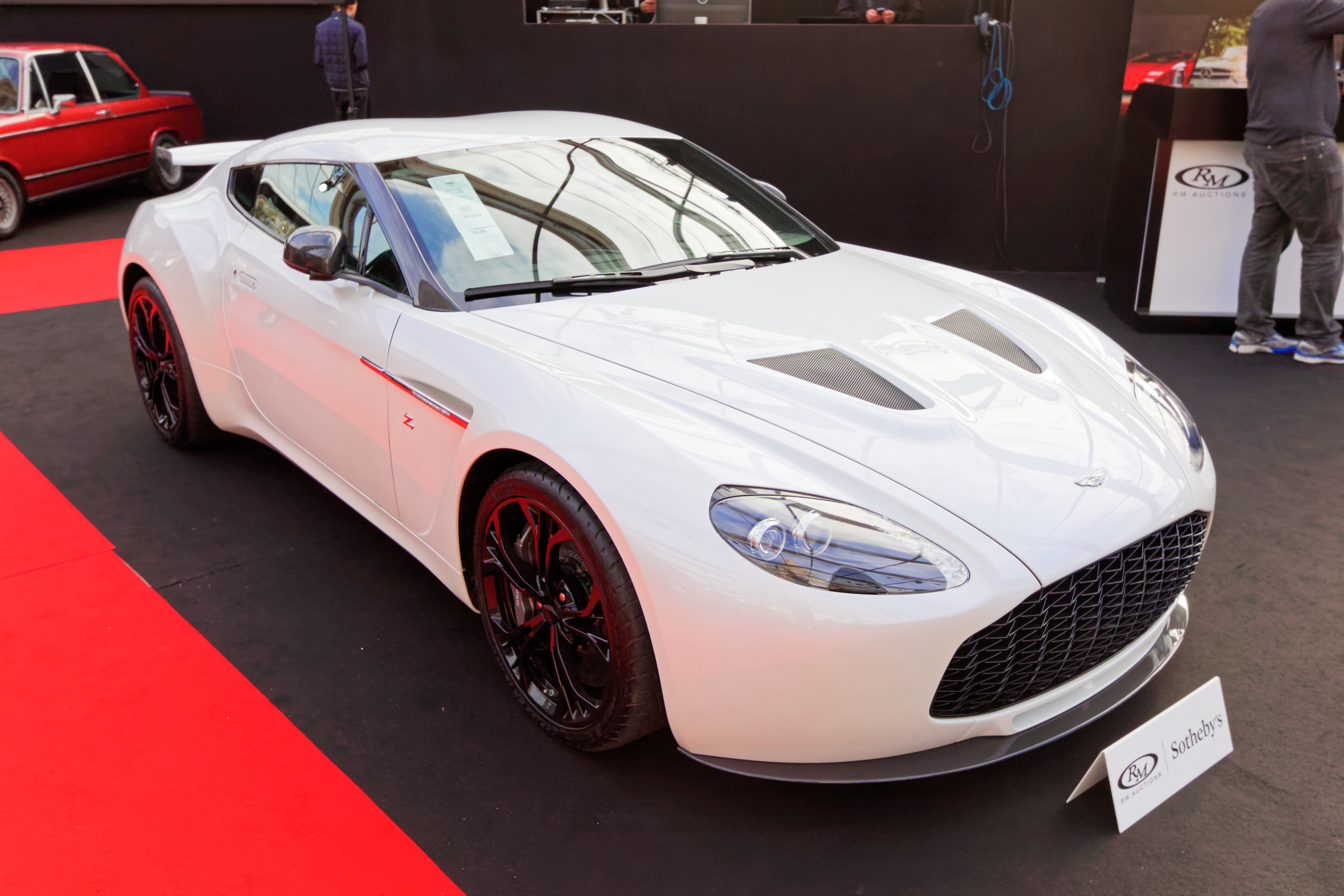
2012 Aston Martin V12 Stradale Zagato

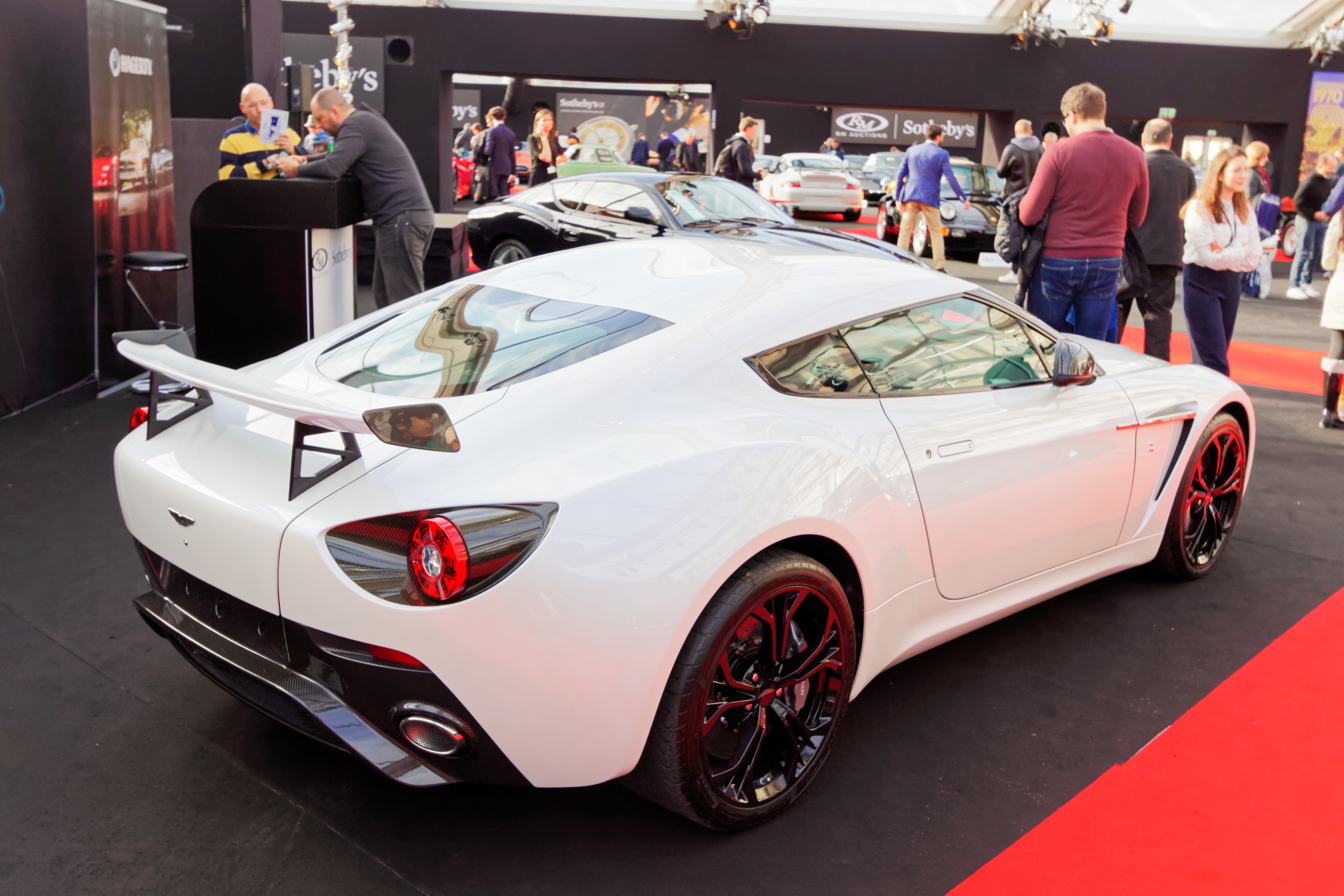
Rear view of the Stradale Zagato
