= Ulrich Bez =

German businessman

Ulrich Helmut Bez (born 7 November 1943 in Bad Cannstatt, Germany) is a German businessman and was, until the end of 2013, chief executive officer of Aston Martin motorcars when he stepped down to serve as non-executive chairman.

== Life ==
Bez holds a doctorate in engineering from Technische Universität Berlin. At various times throughout his career he has been responsible for product design and development at Porsche, BMW and Daewoo Motors.

While at Porsche, he led vehicle research and development and motor sport programmes in Formula One and World Endurance Championship in Indianapolis and Le Mans. He directed design and development of the 911 Turbo, the Carrera RS 2.7, the 968 and the 993.

Bez was the first director of BMW Technik GmbH (BMW Technology), developing a BMW V8 concept engine which helped to replace the big inline six-cylinder with an eight-cylinder engine, a DCT, voice activated car systems as well as the world's first acoustic wind tunnel and the responsibility for the design of the BMW Z1, a leading concept in its time for modularity, material, aerodynamics and safety.

At Daewoo Motors, Bez was vice president of engineering from 1993–1998, helping Daewoo Motors to become a globally recognized brand, involved with the development and launch of a series of models such as the Daewoo Matiz - the first four-door mini car, Daewoo Lanos, Daewoo Leganza and the Daewoo Nubira.

Before he became the chief executive officer and chairman of Aston Martin Lagonda Ltd. in July 2000, he was a business advisor to the Ford Motor Company. Under his leadership Aston Martin has developed into a global recognized luxury brand, selling more than 50,000 cars in 13 years, more than three times the number sold from 1913 to 2000. Under his leadership the company developed and launched - based on the VH architecture which he initiated - 20 major car models, including the DB9, the V8 and V12 Vantage, the Vanquish and the four-door Rapide, as well as the supercar One-77, the V12 Zagato and the Cygnet, a concept addressing the needs of a crowded metropolis. Under his leadership the company also returned to motorsport with the GT1, GT2, GT3, GT4, and GTE cars.

Bez is also a keen racing driver and competed repeatedly at the 24 Hours Nürburgring endurance race. He reached 24th place in 2006, 126th place in 2007, 27th place in 2008 (all in an Aston Martin Vantage N24), and 21st place in the 2009 race (the race debut of the Aston Martin V12 Vantage). He has also run the 1959 24 Hours of Le Mans-winning Aston Martin DBR1 in the Le Mans Legend race together with racing legend Sir Stirling Moss.

In 2013 Bez published a book, Making Aston Martin, which describes his background as well as his work at Aston Martin.

Bez lectured in 2013 and 2014 in Harvard, Columbia, Chicago Booth, UVA Darden, LBS, Kings College, INSEAD, Erasmus, and EBS.

In 2014 Bez joined ALSET, a technology company targeting zero emission in combustion engines with a hydrogen hybrid concept, as a non-executive vice chairman. He also served as an advisory board member for the Althoff Hotel Collection from 2012 to 2015.

In 2017 Bez joined the board of Magnis Energy Technologies as a non-executive director. A battery and technology company with a graphite mine that has strong prospects to become a major producer and supply many industries with very high quality graphite material for batteries and aerospace initiatives. Bez stated: "In my career, I have overseen many projects shaping the future in various areas of the automotive industry, sometimes 10 to 20 years ahead of implementation."

"The Nachu Graphite Project has attributes that can and will make a huge contribution to the automotive industry due to the quality of its graphite resource. The team at Magnis and their expertise in the lithium-ion battery industry, which includes the inventor of the Lithium-ion battery, is testament to the quality of the Project and the Company as a whole. I'm excited to join the Board and help take Magnis to the next stage of its development."

In 2024, Bez was appointed by the Korean NPO Institute, Daewoo Motor Archive Center, which specialized for Daewoo Motor, as an advisory committee member.

== Awards ==
- 1980 Safety award from NHTSA National Highway Traffic Safety USA at ESV Conference in Kyoto
- 2007 German-British Forum Dialogue Award
- 2012 Honorary doctor degree HonDTech from Solent University in Southampton UK
- 2013 ADAC award for special contribution to the Nuerburgring and the 24 hours race

== Literature ==
- Ulrich Bez: Making Aston Martin. teNeues Verlag, 2013, ISBN 978-3832795429

Business positions
Preceded by N/A	Chairman of Aston Martin; January 2014 -	Incumbent
Preceded by Bob Dover	Executive Chairman of Aston Martin; July 2000 - December 2013	Succeeded by Andy Palmer (Chief Executive)
