= Booze =

Booze may refer to:

- Alcoholic beverage, by slang
- Booze, North Yorkshire, a hamlet in England
- Booze (surname), a surname (including a list of people with the name)

== See also ==
- Boos (disambiguation)
- Booz (disambiguation)
- Boozer (disambiguation)
- Boozeville, Georgia, an unincorporated community in the United States
- Boza, a fermented beverage
