= Boos =

Boos or BOOS may refer to:..

== Places ==
=== France ===
- Boos, Seine-Maritime, in Seine-Maritime, France
- Boos, Landes, in Landes, France

=== Germany ===
- Boos, Bavaria, in Bavaria, Germany
- Boos, Bad Kreuznach, in Rhineland-Palatinate, Germany
- Boos, Mayen-Koblenz, in Rhineland-Palatinate, Germany
- Boos-Waldeck Castle, the residence for the Family Boos from 1150 to 1833

== Other uses ==
- Boos (surname)
- Booing
- BOOS (Dutch show)

== See also ==
- Boo (disambiguation)
- Booze (disambiguation)
