= Hiromu Naruse =

Japanese test driver

- 成瀬弘
- Born: 1942; Japan
- Died: 23 June 2010 (aged 67–68); Nürburg, Rhineland-Palatinate, Germany
- Occupation: Test driver

Hiromu Naruse (成瀬弘, Naruse Hiromu) (1942 – 23 June 2010) was the Japanese chief test driver and chief test engineer of Toyota Motor Corporation and chief of the Gazoo Racing team. Naruse had been a test driver for the Toyota team for 47 years (1963–2010). He was also noted as the chief test driver of the Lexus LFA supercar. During his time at Toyota, Naruse became known by the nickname "Meister", and colleagues at Ferrari called him the "man who knows all the world's roads." Naruse also logged more hours at the Nürburgring test track in Germany than any other Japanese driver.

== Career ==
Naruse joined Toyota Motor Corporation in 1963 as a certified auto mechanic, and was initially assigned to the company's Vehicle Evaluation and Engineering Division as a temporary employee. Because he also held a level-2 abacus certificate, Naruse was also considered for a position in the Accounting division. Naruse worked his way up in the company, earning a reputation as one of its top test drivers.

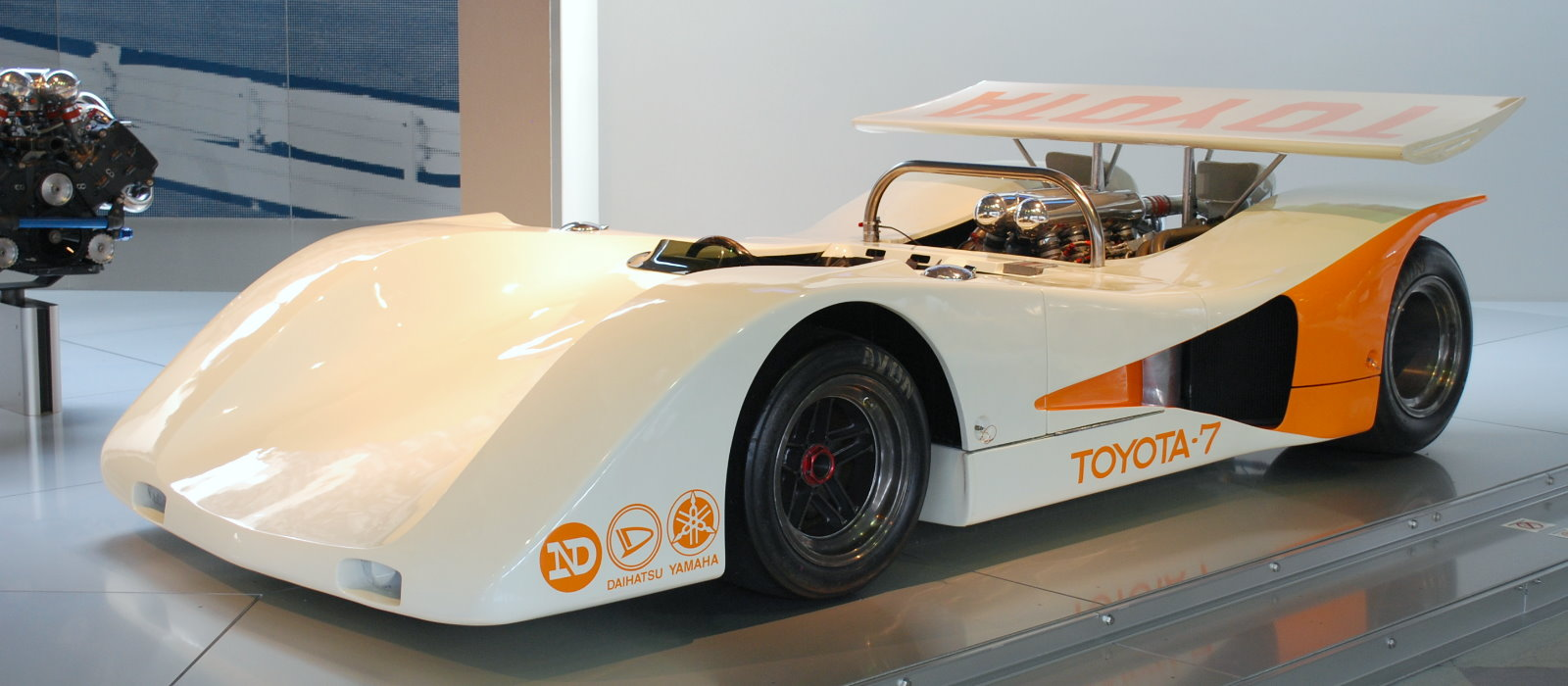
Naruse was chief mechanic of the 1970 Toyota 7 racer

As a company mechanic, early models which Naruse worked on included the Toyota Sports 800 in 1965 and the Toyota 1600GT in 1967. He also helped create the Toyota 2000GT in 1967, Japan's first supercar, and following promotion to chief mechanic, helped produce the company's first custom-built racer, the Toyota 7, in 1970. After ten years with the company, Naruse was placed in charge of motorsports development.

In 1970, Naruse headed the formation of Toyota Motorsports, working in Switzerland as Toyota initiated Japan's first entry into Nürburgring and Spa-Francorchamps racing. That year, he also worked as chief mechanic on the newly introduced Toyota Celica. Naruse would go on to be involved with the development of each Celica generation produced. In the 1980s and 1990s, as a test driver, Naruse helped the development of the Toyota MR2 and the Toyota Supra. By the late 1990s, Naruse had assumed the title of master test driver, heading Toyota's entire test driving staff.

As master test driver, Naruse had input on multiple Toyota company products, ranging from the second generation Toyota Prius to the Toyota MR-S and the Lexus IS. His final development project was the Lexus LFA supercar, which he test-drove extensively, and headed its participation in the 24 Hours Nürburgring from 2008 to 2010. Naruse had suggested the LFA enter the race to obtain feedback for fine-tuning the vehicle for production. In 2010, the LFA won its SP8 class at the race.

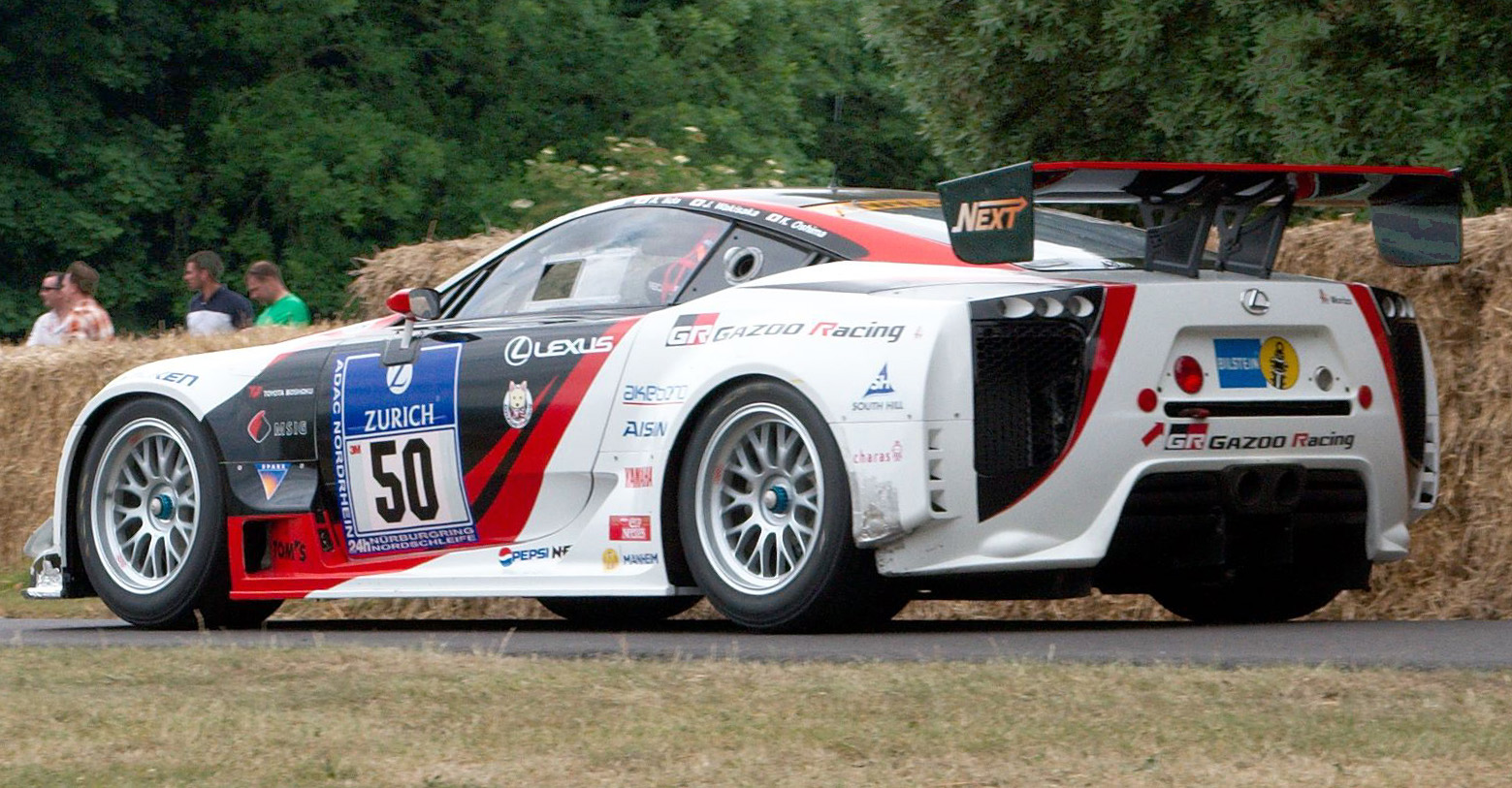
Naruse led the Lexus LFA Gazoo Racing team from 2008 to 2010

During and after the LFA's Nürburgring races, Naruse continued to drive the LFA and other prototypes in Europe and elsewhere. Although nearly 70 years old, he remained active in test driving, and also tackled hillside roads on weekends in Japan. He remained aware of the risks and rewards, stating that:

When we raced the LFA in Nardo, Italy, I thought I might not return to Japan alive. The purpose of this 'test' was to evaluate the car's durability at 200 mph for a long period. The race was in the dark with no lights on the track, plus there were birds flying at me. And imagine if a tire burst. We created the final LFA through these kinds of test experiences.

— Hiromu Naruse, early 2010

By the late 2000s, Naruse was advocating the development of an inexpensive rear-wheel drive coupe for driving enthusiasts. This would later be considered by Toyota in hatchback form to honor Naruse's legacy.

== Death ==
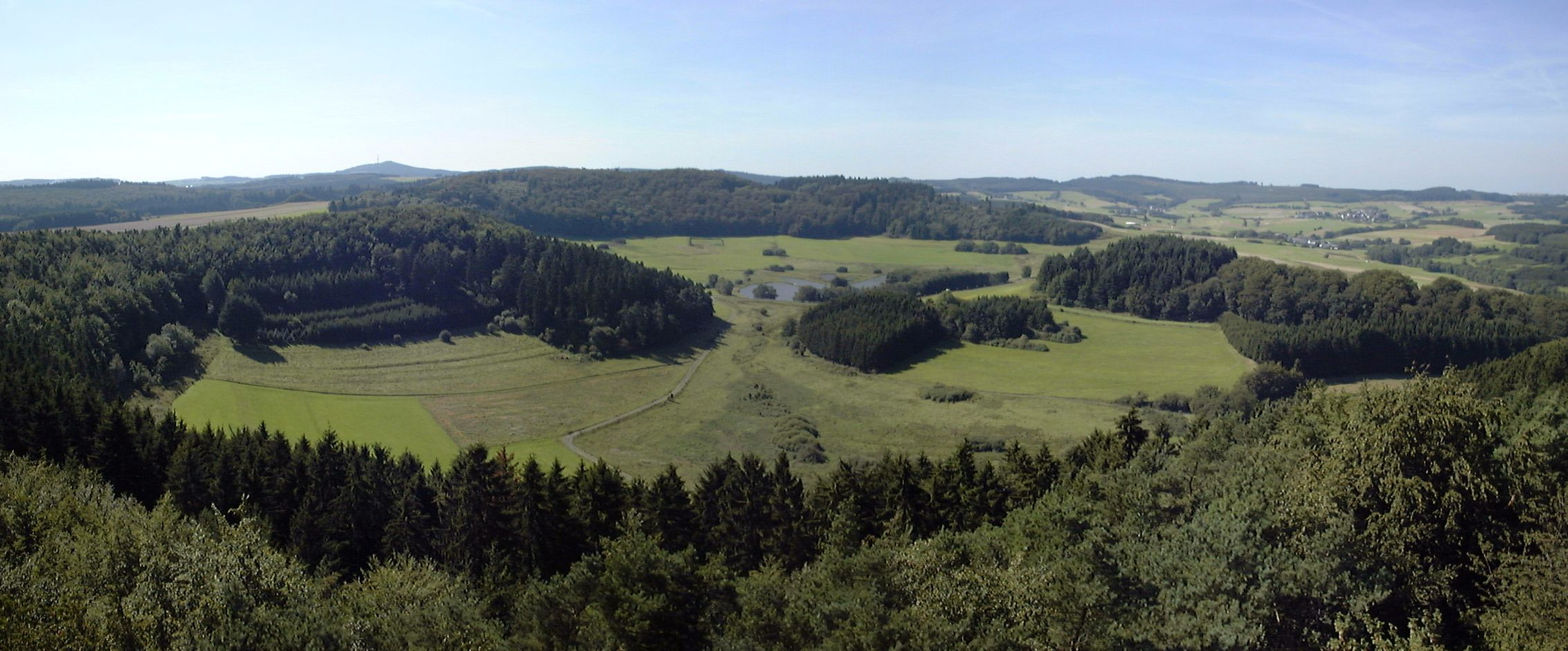
The crash occurred next to the lake of Booser Doppelmaar in the Eifel mountains

On the afternoon of 23 June 2010, Naruse crashed his Lexus LFA Nürburgring Edition prototype frontally into a BMW production car near the Nürburgring, Germany. Both cars were a total loss. He was 67.

The LFA veered into oncoming traffic, colliding head-on with a BMW 3 series on the L94 road at Boos, near the Nürburgring. The BMW was also a test vehicle, and both occupants were injured, one critically. All three test drivers wore helmets. The left hand drive Lexus had been photographed previously with a driver wearing a white helmet.
