= Boozer (surname) =

Boozer is a surname. Notable people with the surname include:

- Allen Boozer (born 1944), American physicist
- Bob Boozer (1937–2012), American former professional basketball player
- Brenda Boozer (born 1948), is American singer
- Cameron Boozer (born 2007), American basketball player, son of Carlos
- Carlos Boozer (born 1981), professional basketball player
- Cayden Boozer (born 2007), American basketball player, son of Carlos
- Don Boozer (fl. 2007), American constructed language creator
- Emerson Boozer (born 1943), professional American football player
- F. Vernon Boozer (born 1936), former American politician
- John Boozer (1938–1986), American baseball player
- Margaret Boozer (born 1966), American ceramist and sculptor
- Marie Boozer (c.1846 – 1908) adventuress from South Carolina
- Mel Boozer (1946–1987), American politician
- Young Boozer (born 1948), American politician

== See also ==
- Cam Booser (born 1992), American baseball player
- Boozer (disambiguation)
