= 2007 24 Hours of Nürburgring =

Endurance motor race in Germany

2007 ADAC 24 Hours of Nürburgring

Seasons
- ← 2006 2008 →

Nürburgring 24h track (Nordschleife+GP Circuit without Mercedes-Arena)

The 2007 ADAC Zurich 24 Hours of Nürburgring was the 35th running of the 24 Hours of Nürburgring. It took place on June 10, 2007. Manthey Racing's #1 Porsche claimed honours in the SP7 class and was the overall victor, completing 112 laps over the 24 hours. Zakspeed Racing and their #3 Dodge Viper claimed second overall and finished as top runner in the SP8 GT3 class.

== Race results ==
Class winners in bold.

35. ADAC Zurich 24h Rennen
Pos	Class	No	Team	Drivers	Chassis	Tyre	Laps
Pos	Class	No	Team	Drivers	Engine	Tyre	Laps
1	**SP7**	**1**	(Germany) **Manthey Racing**	(Germany) **Timo Bernhard** (Germany) **Marc Lieb** (France) **Romain Dumas** (Germany) **Marcel Tiemann**	**Porsche 997 GT3-R**	**M**	**112**
1	**SP7**	**1**	(Germany) **Manthey Racing**	(Germany) **Timo Bernhard** (Germany) **Marc Lieb** (France) **Romain Dumas** (Germany) **Marcel Tiemann**	Porsche 4.0L Flat-6	**M**	**112**
2	**SP8**	**3**	(Germany) **Zakspeed Racing GmbH & Co. KG**	(Netherlands) **Duncan Huisman** (Netherlands) **Tom Coronel** (Germany) **Patrick Simon** (France) **Christophe Bouchut**	**Dodge Viper GTS-R**	**M**	**111**
2	**SP8**	**3**	(Germany) **Zakspeed Racing GmbH & Co. KG**	(Netherlands) **Duncan Huisman** (Netherlands) **Tom Coronel** (Germany) **Patrick Simon** (France) **Christophe Bouchut**	Viper 8.0L V10	**M**	**111**
3	SP7	25	(Germany) Land Motorsport	(Germany) Marc Basseng (Germany) Dirk Adorf (Germany) Marc Hennerici (Germany) Frank Stippler	Porsche 911 GT3-RSR	**P**	111
3	SP7	25	(Germany) Land Motorsport	(Germany) Marc Basseng (Germany) Dirk Adorf (Germany) Marc Hennerici (Germany) Frank Stippler	Porsche 4.0L Flat-6	**P**	111
4	SP7	2	(Germany) Hankook/H&R Spezialfedern	(Germany) Jürgen Alzen (Germany) Uwe Alzen (Germany) Christian Menzel (Germany) Christian Mamerow	Porsche Cayman	**H**	108
4	SP7	2	(Germany) Hankook/H&R Spezialfedern	(Germany) Jürgen Alzen (Germany) Uwe Alzen (Germany) Christian Menzel (Germany) Christian Mamerow	?	**H**	108
5	**SP6**	**50**	(Germany) **Motorsport Arena Oschersleben**	(Germany) **Claudia Hürtgen** (Germany) **Hans-Joachim Stuck** (Austria) **Johannes Stuck** (Sweden) **Richard Göransson**	**BMW Z4 M Coupe**	**D**	**106**
5	**SP6**	**50**	(Germany) **Motorsport Arena Oschersleben**	(Germany) **Claudia Hürtgen** (Germany) **Hans-Joachim Stuck** (Austria) **Johannes Stuck** (Sweden) **Richard Göransson**	BMW 3.2L I6	**D**	**106**
6	SP7	29	(Germany) paragon AG	(Germany) Pierre Kaffer (Germany) Klaus Dieter Frers (Germany) Patrick Bernhardt (Germany) Jörg Hardt	Porsche 997 GT3 RSR	?	104
6	SP7	29	(Germany) paragon AG	(Germany) Pierre Kaffer (Germany) Klaus Dieter Frers (Germany) Patrick Bernhardt (Germany) Jörg Hardt	Porsche 3.6L Flat 6	?	104
7	SP7	15	(United States) Team Shane Fox	(United States) Shane Fox (Germany) Wolfgang Weber (Germany) Lothar Diederich (Germany) Uwe Nittel	Ruf RGT	?	103
7	SP7	15	(United States) Team Shane Fox	(United States) Shane Fox (Germany) Wolfgang Weber (Germany) Lothar Diederich (Germany) Uwe Nittel	?	?	103
8	**SP3T**	**111**	(Germany) **Volkswagen Motorsport**	(Germany) **René Rast** (Norway) **Jimmy Johansen** (Germany) **Florian Gruber**	**Volkswagen Golf V**	**M**	**101**
8	**SP3T**	**111**	(Germany) **Volkswagen Motorsport**	(Germany) **René Rast** (Norway) **Jimmy Johansen** (Germany) **Florian Gruber**	?	**M**	**101**
9	**SP3**	**118**	(Germany) **Kissling Motorsport**	(Germany) **Heinz-Otto Fritzsche** (Germany) **Jürgen Fritzsche** (Germany) **Rainer Bastuck** (Germany) **Stefan Kissling**	**Opel Astra GTC**	?	**101**
9	**SP3**	**118**	(Germany) **Kissling Motorsport**	(Germany) **Heinz-Otto Fritzsche** (Germany) **Jürgen Fritzsche** (Germany) **Rainer Bastuck** (Germany) **Stefan Kissling**	Opel 2.0L I4	?	**101**
10	**SP4-5**	**69**		(Germany) **Rudi Adams** (Germany) **Gregor Vogler** (Germany) **Arnd Meier** (Germany) **Rainer Dörr**	**BMW 130i**	**P**	**101**
10	**SP4-5**	**69**		(Germany) **Rudi Adams** (Germany) **Gregor Vogler** (Germany) **Arnd Meier** (Germany) **Rainer Dörr**	BMW 3.0L I6	**P**	**101**
11	SP7	59	(Germany) Bonnfinanz Motorsport	(Germany) Oliver Rövenich (Germany) Mario Merten (Germany) Thomas Brügmann (Germany) Wolf Silvester	Porsche 996 GT3 Cup	?	100
11	SP7	59	(Germany) Bonnfinanz Motorsport	(Germany) Oliver Rövenich (Germany) Mario Merten (Germany) Thomas Brügmann (Germany) Wolf Silvester	Porsche 4.0L Flat-6	?	100
12	SP7	26	(Australia) Juniper Racing	(New Zealand) Craig Baird (Australia) Anthony Quinn (Australia) Klark Quinn (New Zealand) Kevin Bell	Porsche 911 GT3-RSR	**M**	100
12	SP7	26	(Australia) Juniper Racing	(New Zealand) Craig Baird (Australia) Anthony Quinn (Australia) Klark Quinn (New Zealand) Kevin Bell	Porsche 4.0L Flat-6	**M**	100
13	SP4-5	97	(Germany) Team DMV e.V.	(Germany) Jürgen Schumann (Germany) Peter Schumann (Germany) Christian Hohenadel (United Kingdom) Peter Cate	Hyundai Coupe V6	?	99
13	SP4-5	97	(Germany) Team DMV e.V.	(Germany) Jürgen Schumann (Germany) Peter Schumann (Germany) Christian Hohenadel (United Kingdom) Peter Cate	Hyundai 2.7L V6	?	99
14	SP7	10	(Germany) Scuderia Augustusburg	(Germany) Johannes Scheid (Germany) Oliver Kainz (Germany) David Horn (Germany) Matthias Teich	BMW M3 E46 GTS	**P**	99
14	SP7	10	(Germany) Scuderia Augustusburg	(Germany) Johannes Scheid (Germany) Oliver Kainz (Germany) David Horn (Germany) Matthias Teich	BMW 4.0L V8	**P**	99
15	SP4-5	72	(Germany) MSC Ruhr Blitz	(Germany) Willi Obermann (Italy) Ivano Giuliani (Italy) Roberto Ragazzi	BMW M3 E46	?	99
15	SP4-5	72	(Germany) MSC Ruhr Blitz	(Germany) Willi Obermann (Italy) Ivano Giuliani (Italy) Roberto Ragazzi	BMW 4.0L V8	?	99
16	SP7	31	(Belgium) Mühlner Motorsport SPRL	(United Kingdom) Jonathan Backer (Australia) Peter Boylan (Australia) Geoffrey Morgan (Sweden) Ulf Karlsson	Porsche 911 GT3-RSR	?	99
16	SP7	31	(Belgium) Mühlner Motorsport SPRL	(United Kingdom) Jonathan Backer (Australia) Peter Boylan (Australia) Geoffrey Morgan (Sweden) Ulf Karlsson	Porsche 4.0L Flat-6	?	99
17	SP3	108		(Germany) Andreas Mäder (Germany) Reinhold Renger (Switzerland) Harald Jacksties (Germany) Reiner Schönauer	Honda S2000	**Y**	98
17	SP3	108		(Germany) Andreas Mäder (Germany) Reinhold Renger (Switzerland) Harald Jacksties (Germany) Reiner Schönauer	Honda 2.2L I4	**Y**	98
18	SP6	49	(Germany) Duller Motorsport	(Italy) Luca Cappellari (Italy) Fabrizio Gollin (Italy) Andrea Belicchi (Italy) Edi Orioli	BMW M3 E46	?	98
18	SP6	49	(Germany) Duller Motorsport	(Italy) Luca Cappellari (Italy) Fabrizio Gollin (Italy) Andrea Belicchi (Italy) Edi Orioli	BMW 4.0L V8	?	98
19	SP3	113		(Germany) Frank Stippler (Norway) Hakon Schjaerin (Norway) Roger Sandberg (Norway) Atle Gulbrandsen	Audi A4	**C**	98
19	SP3	113		(Germany) Frank Stippler (Norway) Hakon Schjaerin (Norway) Roger Sandberg (Norway) Atle Gulbrandsen	?	**C**	98
20	SP6	64	(Germany) MSC-Rhön e.V. i. AvD	(France) Pierre de Thoisy (France) Thierry Depoix (France) Philippe Haezebrouck	BMW M3 E46	?	98
20	SP6	64	(Germany) MSC-Rhön e.V. i. AvD	(France) Pierre de Thoisy (France) Thierry Depoix (France) Philippe Haezebrouck	BMW 4.0 V8	?	98
21	SP 4-5	94		(Germany) Hans-Hatto Karl (Germany) Udo Förster (Germany) Werner Bauer (Spain) Pedro Passyutu	BMW M3 E30	?	98
21	SP 4-5	94		(Germany) Hans-Hatto Karl (Germany) Udo Förster (Germany) Werner Bauer (Spain) Pedro Passyutu	?	?	98
22	SP6	53		(Germany) Dirk Lehn (Germany) Christoph Eicker (Germany) Nils Bartels (Germany) Andreas Teichmann	Porsche Cayman CSR	**H**	97
22	SP6	53		(Germany) Dirk Lehn (Germany) Christoph Eicker (Germany) Nils Bartels (Germany) Andreas Teichmann	Porsche 3.4L Flat 6	**H**	97
23	SP3T	138		(Germany) Bora Bölck (Germany) Andre Picker (Germany) Bernd Schneider (Germany) Gerd-Michael Schumacher	SEAT León Supercopa	?	97
23	SP3T	138		(Germany) Bora Bölck (Germany) Andre Picker (Germany) Bernd Schneider (Germany) Gerd-Michael Schumacher	SEAT 2.0L I4	?	97
24	**SP4T**	**86**		(Germany) **Sebastian Asch** (Germany) **Urs Bressan** (Germany) **Stephan Wölflick**	**Ford Focus STR**	?	**97**
24	**SP4T**	**86**		(Germany) **Sebastian Asch** (Germany) **Urs Bressan** (Germany) **Stephan Wölflick**	?	?	**97**
25	**V5**	**215**		(Germany) **Alexander Böhm** (Germany) **Michael Rebhan** (Republic of Ireland) **Sean Paul Breslin** (Germany) **Rolf Scheibner**	**BMW 392 C**	?	**96**
25	**V5**	**215**		(Germany) **Alexander Böhm** (Germany) **Michael Rebhan** (Republic of Ireland) **Sean Paul Breslin** (Germany) **Rolf Scheibner**	?	?	**96**
26	SP6	48		(Germany) Klaus Niedzwiedz (Japan) Takayuki Kinoshita (Switzerland) Peter Wyss (Germany) Werner Kather	Honda NSX Type R	**M**	96
26	SP6	48		(Germany) Klaus Niedzwiedz (Japan) Takayuki Kinoshita (Switzerland) Peter Wyss (Germany) Werner Kather	Honda 3.4L V6	**M**	96
27	**S1**	**263**	(Germany) **Motorsport Arena Oschersleben**	(Norway) **Stian Sörlie** (Germany) **Jörg Viebahn** (Germany) **Kai Riemer** (Germany) **Torsten Schubert**	**BMW 120d**	**D**	**96**
27	**S1**	**263**	(Germany) **Motorsport Arena Oschersleben**	(Norway) **Stian Sörlie** (Germany) **Jörg Viebahn** (Germany) **Kai Riemer** (Germany) **Torsten Schubert**	BMW 2.0L I4	**D**	**96**
28	V5	171		(Germany) Werner Gusenbauer (Bahrain) Jaber Ali Khalifa Alkhalifa (Germany) Andreas Herwerth (Germany) Timo Schupp	BMW M3 E36	?	96
28	V5	171		(Germany) Werner Gusenbauer (Bahrain) Jaber Ali Khalifa Alkhalifa (Germany) Andreas Herwerth (Germany) Timo Schupp	BMW 3.0L I6	?	96
29	SP6	62	(Germany) ORMS Racing-Wiemann	(Germany) Marko Hartung (Germany) Stefan Neuberger (Germany) Franz Engstler	BMW Z4	?	96
29	SP6	62	(Germany) ORMS Racing-Wiemann	(Germany) Marko Hartung (Germany) Stefan Neuberger (Germany) Franz Engstler	BMW 3.2L I6	?	96
30	SP7	12	(Germany) Wochenspiegel Team Manthey	(Germany) Georg Weiss (Germany) Peter-Paul Pietsch (United States) Michael Jacobs (Germany) Dieter Schornstein	Porsche 997 GT3	**M**	96
30	SP7	12	(Germany) Wochenspiegel Team Manthey	(Germany) Georg Weiss (Germany) Peter-Paul Pietsch (United States) Michael Jacobs (Germany) Dieter Schornstein	Porsche 3.6L Flat 6	**M**	96
31	SP7		(Germany) Cargraphic-Birkart-RDM-Racing	(Germany) Steffen Schlichenmeier (Germany) Jacques Meyer (Germany) Peter König (Germany) Kurt Ecke	Porsche 993 Cup	**D**	96
31	SP7		(Germany) Cargraphic-Birkart-RDM-Racing	(Germany) Steffen Schlichenmeier (Germany) Jacques Meyer (Germany) Peter König (Germany) Kurt Ecke	Porsche 3.6L Flat 6	**D**	96
32	V5	208	(Germany) Schirra-Motoring / Krah & Enders	(United States) Peter Enders (Germany) Henry Walkenhorst (Germany) Markus Oestreich (United States) Peter Enders Jr.	BMW Z4 M Coupe	?	95
32	V5	208	(Germany) Schirra-Motoring / Krah & Enders	(United States) Peter Enders (Germany) Henry Walkenhorst (Germany) Markus Oestreich (United States) Peter Enders Jr.	BMW 3.2L I6	?	95
33	SP7	33	(Japan) Falken Motorsports	(United Kingdom) Peter Dumbreck (Belgium) Dirk Schoysman (Japan) Tetsuya Tanaka (Japan) Kazuki Hoshino	Nissan 350Z	**F**	94
33	SP7	33	(Japan) Falken Motorsports	(United Kingdom) Peter Dumbreck (Belgium) Dirk Schoysman (Japan) Tetsuya Tanaka (Japan) Kazuki Hoshino	Nissan 3.5L V6	**F**	94
34	**V3-V4**	**195**	(Germany) **Black Falcon/Performance Center Nürburg**	(Germany) **Christian Senz** (Germany) **Dieter Lehner** (Germany) **Matthias Unger** (Germany) **Ventura Bona**	**BMW E90**	?	**94**
34	**V3-V4**	**195**	(Germany) **Black Falcon/Performance Center Nürburg**	(Germany) **Christian Senz** (Germany) **Dieter Lehner** (Germany) **Matthias Unger** (Germany) **Ventura Bona**	BMW 3.0L I6	?	**94**
35	V5	213	(Germany) Dürener Motorsport Club e.V. i. ADAC	(Germany) Bernd Küpper (Germany) Klaus Koch (Germany) Benjamin Weidner (Germany) Michael Hess	BMW M3 Coupe	?	94
35	V5	213	(Germany) Dürener Motorsport Club e.V. i. ADAC	(Germany) Bernd Küpper (Germany) Klaus Koch (Germany) Benjamin Weidner (Germany) Michael Hess	?	?	94
36	V5	214		(Germany) Sascha Hanke (Germany) Jürgen Peter (Germany) Jörg Klinkhammer (Germany) Jens Hawner	BMW M3 E36 GT	**Y**	94
36	V5	214		(Germany) Sascha Hanke (Germany) Jürgen Peter (Germany) Jörg Klinkhammer (Germany) Jens Hawner	BMW 3.0L I6	**Y**	94
37	S1	261	(Germany) Motorsport Arena Oschersleben	(United States) Michael Auriemma (United States) John Mayes (United States) Jimmy Locke (Germany) Marc Bronzel	BMW 120d	**D**	94
37	S1	261	(Germany) Motorsport Arena Oschersleben	(United States) Michael Auriemma (United States) John Mayes (United States) Jimmy Locke (Germany) Marc Bronzel	BMW 2.0L I4	**D**	94
38	SP4-5	75		(Germany) Kornelius Hoffmann (Germany) Peter Seher (Germany) Iris Hoffmann (Germany) Hans Schütt	BMW M3	?	94
38	SP4-5	75		(Germany) Kornelius Hoffmann (Germany) Peter Seher (Germany) Iris Hoffmann (Germany) Hans Schütt	?	?	94
39	SP3	120	(Germany) H&R Spezialfedern GmbH	(Germany) Herbert von Danwitz (Germany) Marcel Hoppe (Germany) Peter Venn (Germany) Norbert Bermes	Honda Civic Type R	?	93
39	SP3	120	(Germany) H&R Spezialfedern GmbH	(Germany) Herbert von Danwitz (Germany) Marcel Hoppe (Germany) Peter Venn (Germany) Norbert Bermes	Honda 2.0L I4	?	93
40	**SP Cup**	**236**	(Germany) **VLN Honda Junior Team-FH Köln Motorsport**	(Germany) **Nicole Müllenmeister** (Germany) **Marc-Uwe von Niesewand** (Germany) **Daniel Ortmann** (Germany) **Benjamin Koske**	**Honda Civic Type R**	**BF**	**93**
40	**SP Cup**	**236**	(Germany) **VLN Honda Junior Team-FH Köln Motorsport**	(Germany) **Nicole Müllenmeister** (Germany) **Marc-Uwe von Niesewand** (Germany) **Daniel Ortmann** (Germany) **Benjamin Koske**	Honda 2.0L I4	**BF**	**93**
41	SP Cup	225	(Germany) Team DMV	(Germany) Mark Giesbrecht (Germany) Hans Keutmann (Germany) Dino Drössiger (United States) Spencer Trenery	Honda Civic Type R	**BF**	93
41	SP Cup	225	(Germany) Team DMV	(Germany) Mark Giesbrecht (Germany) Hans Keutmann (Germany) Dino Drössiger (United States) Spencer Trenery	Honda 2.0L I4	**BF**	93
42	SP8	16	(Germany) Lambo-Racing	(Germany) Stephan Rösler (Germany) Andreas Kitzerow (Germany) Florian Scholze (Austria) Georg Silbermayr	Lamborghini Gallardo GTR	?	93
42	SP8	16	(Germany) Lambo-Racing	(Germany) Stephan Rösler (Germany) Andreas Kitzerow (Germany) Florian Scholze (Austria) Georg Silbermayr	Lamborghini 5.0L V10	?	93
43	V3-V4	194	(Germany) Black Falcon/Performance Center Nürburg	(Germany) Holger Zulauf (Netherlands) Dillon Koster (Germany) Marian Winz (Italy) Diego Romanini	BMW E90	?	93
43	V3-V4	194	(Germany) Black Falcon/Performance Center Nürburg	(Germany) Holger Zulauf (Netherlands) Dillon Koster (Germany) Marian Winz (Italy) Diego Romanini	BMW 3.0L I6	?	93
44	V5	170	(Germany) Pistenclub e.V.	(Germany) René Wolff (Germany) Pascal Engel (Germany) Christer Jöns (Germany) Axel Nolde	BMW M3 Coupe	**Y**	92
44	V5	170	(Germany) Pistenclub e.V.	(Germany) René Wolff (Germany) Pascal Engel (Germany) Christer Jöns (Germany) Axel Nolde	?	**Y**	92
45	SP3	119	(Germany) Kissling Motorsport	(Germany) Olaf Beckmann (Germany) Volker Strycek (Germany) Peter Hass (Germany) Bernhard Schmittner	Opel Manta B2	**Y**	92
45	SP3	119	(Germany) Kissling Motorsport	(Germany) Olaf Beckmann (Germany) Volker Strycek (Germany) Peter Hass (Germany) Bernhard Schmittner	Opel 2.0L I4	**Y**	92
46	SP3	115		(Germany) Matthias Behr (Germany) Theo Winkler (Germany) Walter Weber	BMW 320i S	**D**	91
46	SP3	115		(Germany) Matthias Behr (Germany) Theo Winkler (Germany) Walter Weber	BMW 2.0L I4	**D**	91
47	SP8	23		(Germany) Bernd Schlee (Germany) Marc Christoffel (Germany) Peter Keltsch (Italy) Giampaolo Tenchini	Volkswagen Golf V R32 HGP	**P**	91
47	SP8	23		(Germany) Bernd Schlee (Germany) Marc Christoffel (Germany) Peter Keltsch (Italy) Giampaolo Tenchini	Volkswagen 3.2L V6	**P**	91
48	V3-V4	207		(Germany) Hans-Rolf Salzer (Germany) Sascha Salzer	BMW M3 E30	**D**	91
48	V3-V4	207		(Germany) Hans-Rolf Salzer (Germany) Sascha Salzer	BMW 2.3L I4	**D**	91
49	SP3	136		(Germany) Uwe Reich (Germany) Markus Leger (Germany) Michael Wellmann (Germany) Alexander Starke	Renault Clio RS	?	91
49	SP3	136		(Germany) Uwe Reich (Germany) Markus Leger (Germany) Michael Wellmann (Germany) Alexander Starke	Renault 2.0L I4	?	91
50	SP4-5	76		(Germany) Lutz Kögel (Germany) Peter Bonk (Switzerland) Urs Schild (Germany) Stefan Aust	BMW M3	**Y**	91
50	SP4-5	76		(Germany) Lutz Kögel (Germany) Peter Bonk (Switzerland) Urs Schild (Germany) Stefan Aust	BMW 3.2L I6	**Y**	91
51	SP6	60		(Australia) Ric Shaw (Australia) Stephen Borness (Australia) Phil Alexander	Mazda RX-7 Turbo	?	91
51	SP6	60		(Australia) Ric Shaw (Australia) Stephen Borness (Australia) Phil Alexander	Mazda Rotary	?	91
52	SP3T	100	(Germany) AC Mayen e.V.	(Germany) Ralph Kempen (Germany) Marcus Bierlein (Germany) Thomas Koll (Germany) Timo Frings	SEAT Leon	?	91
52	SP3T	100	(Germany) AC Mayen e.V.	(Germany) Ralph Kempen (Germany) Marcus Bierlein (Germany) Thomas Koll (Germany) Timo Frings	SEAT 2.0L I4	?	91
53	V3-V4	206	(Germany) Berg-Cup e.V.	(Germany) Andreas Schettler (Germany) Dirk Roth (Germany) Thomas Mautner	Mercedes-Benz 190 E 2.5-16	**D**	90
53	V3-V4	206	(Germany) Berg-Cup e.V.	(Germany) Andreas Schettler (Germany) Dirk Roth (Germany) Thomas Mautner	Mercedes-Benz 2.5L I4	**D**	90
54	**V2**	**182**		(Germany) **Colin Roloff** (Germany) **Georg Griesemann** (Germany) **Björn Griesemann**	**BMW 318 is**	**Y**	**90**
54	**V2**	**182**		(Germany) **Colin Roloff** (Germany) **Georg Griesemann** (Germany) **Björn Griesemann**	BMW 1.8L I4	**Y**	**90**
55	V2	210		(Germany) Winfried Meseke (Germany) Frank Möller (Germany) Alexander Schula	BMW 318 is	**M**	90
55	V2	210		(Germany) Winfried Meseke (Germany) Frank Möller (Germany) Alexander Schula	BMW 1.8L I4	**M**	90
56	SP Cup	232		(Germany) Christoph Dupré (Germany) Claus Dupré (Germany) Manuel Lauck	Honda Civic Type R	?	90
56	SP Cup	232		(Germany) Christoph Dupré (Germany) Claus Dupré (Germany) Manuel Lauck	Honda 2.0L I4	?	90
57	SP3T	102		(Germany) Helmut Dutz (Germany) Alex Winter (Germany) Yuderi Savas (Germany) Bruno Fechner	Mitsubishi Lancer Evolution VIII	**Y**	90
57	SP3T	102		(Germany) Helmut Dutz (Germany) Alex Winter (Germany) Yuderi Savas (Germany) Bruno Fechner	?	**Y**	90
58	SP3	117		(Germany) Arndt Hallmanns (Germany) Thomas Frank (Germany) Eric Freichels (Germany) Michael Klotz	Honda Civic Type R	?	90
58	SP3	117		(Germany) Arndt Hallmanns (Germany) Thomas Frank (Germany) Eric Freichels (Germany) Michael Klotz	?	?	90
59	SP6	80	(Germany) Live-Strip.com Racing	(Germany) Frank Jelinski (Germany) Rudi Seher (Germany) Karlheinz Grüner (Germany) Werner Fischer	BMW M3	**K**	90
59	SP6	80	(Germany) Live-Strip.com Racing	(Germany) Frank Jelinski (Germany) Rudi Seher (Germany) Karlheinz Grüner (Germany) Werner Fischer	BMW 4.0L V8	**K**	90
60	**N1-N2**	**221**		(New Zealand) **Gene Rollinson** (New Zealand) **Stu Owers** (New Zealand) **Rhys McKay** (New Zealand) **Michael Eden**	**Honda Civic Type R**	**Y**	**89**
60	**N1-N2**	**221**		(New Zealand) **Gene Rollinson** (New Zealand) **Stu Owers** (New Zealand) **Rhys McKay** (New Zealand) **Michael Eden**	Honda 2.0L I4	**Y**	**89**
61	**SP2**	**161**	(Germany) **Team Lauderbach Motorsport**	(Ukraine) **Andrii Kruglyk** (Sweden) **Steffen Ramer** (Australia) **Ian Green** (Germany) **Michael Schulze**	**Ford Fiesta**	**Y**	**89**
61	**SP2**	**161**	(Germany) **Team Lauderbach Motorsport**	(Ukraine) **Andrii Kruglyk** (Sweden) **Steffen Ramer** (Australia) **Ian Green** (Germany) **Michael Schulze**	?	**Y**	**89**
62	SP8	6		(Belgium) Arnold Herreman (Belgium) Kurt Dujardyn (Belgium) Anton Gonnissen (Belgium) Jean-Paul Herreman	Aston Martin V8 Vantage N24	?	89
62	SP8	6		(Belgium) Arnold Herreman (Belgium) Kurt Dujardyn (Belgium) Anton Gonnissen (Belgium) Jean-Paul Herreman	Aston Martin 4.3L V8	?	89
63	SP4-5	77		(Germany) Frank Nöhring (United Kingdom) Colin White (Germany) Ingo Tepel	BMW M3 E46	?	89
63	SP4-5	77		(Germany) Frank Nöhring (United Kingdom) Colin White (Germany) Ingo Tepel	?	?	89
64	SP8	44		(Australia) Mal Rose (Australia) Adam Wallis (Australia) Anthony Robson (Australia) Kevin Burton	Holden Commodore	**T**	89
64	SP8	44		(Australia) Mal Rose (Australia) Adam Wallis (Australia) Anthony Robson (Australia) Kevin Burton	Holden 6.0L V8	**T**	89
65	V2	175	(Germany) MSC Wahlscheid e.V. i. ADAC	(Germany) Rolf Derscheid (Germany) Michael Flehmer (Germany) Werner Schlehecker (Germany) Marco Wolf	BMW 318is E36	?	88
65	V2	175	(Germany) MSC Wahlscheid e.V. i. ADAC	(Germany) Rolf Derscheid (Germany) Michael Flehmer (Germany) Werner Schlehecker (Germany) Marco Wolf	BMW 1.8L I4	?	88
66	SP3	130	(Germany) tolimit	(New Zealand) Gavin Dawson (New Zealand) Andrew Higgins (New Zealand) Scott O'Donnell (Germany) Jörg Chmiela	Renault Clio Cup	?	88
66	SP3	130	(Germany) tolimit	(New Zealand) Gavin Dawson (New Zealand) Andrew Higgins (New Zealand) Scott O'Donnell (Germany) Jörg Chmiela	Renault 2.0L I4	?	88
67	V5	218	(Germany) MSC-Rhön e.V. i. AvD	(France) Jean Charles Levy (France) Eric van de Vyver (France) Didier Caradec (France) André-Alain Corbel	BMW M3 GT	**D**	88
67	V5	218	(Germany) MSC-Rhön e.V. i. AvD	(France) Jean Charles Levy (France) Eric van de Vyver (France) Didier Caradec (France) André-Alain Corbel	BMW 3.0L I6	**D**	88
68	N1-N2	220		(New Zealand) Brian McGovern (New Zealand) John McIntyre (New Zealand) Timothy Martin (New Zealand) Gregory Taylor	Honda Civic Type R	**Y**	88
68	N1-N2	220		(New Zealand) Brian McGovern (New Zealand) John McIntyre (New Zealand) Timothy Martin (New Zealand) Gregory Taylor	Honda 2.0L I4	**Y**	88
69	SP2	152		(Germany) Günter Kühlewein (Germany) Jörg Dörre (Germany) Hannes Pfledderer	Honda Civic EK 4	?	88
69	SP2	152		(Germany) Günter Kühlewein (Germany) Jörg Dörre (Germany) Hannes Pfledderer	?	?	88
70	SP6	58		(Russia) Sergey Matveev (Ukraine) Oleksiy Kikireshko (Russia) Stanislav Gryazin (Ukraine) Valeriy Gorban	BMW M3 E46	**Y**	88
70	SP6	58		(Russia) Sergey Matveev (Ukraine) Oleksiy Kikireshko (Russia) Stanislav Gryazin (Ukraine) Valeriy Gorban	BMW 4.0L V8	**Y**	88
71	SP2	154		(Germany) Jana Meiswinkel (Germany) Jutta Beisiegel (Germany) Stefanie Manns	Ford Focus ST	?	87
71	SP2	154		(Germany) Jana Meiswinkel (Germany) Jutta Beisiegel (Germany) Stefanie Manns	Ford 2.5L I5	?	87
72	V3-V4	200		(Germany) Florian Hildner (Germany) Roland Mühlbauer (Germany) Wilfried Selbach	BMW 325i E46	?	87
72	V3-V4	200		(Germany) Florian Hildner (Germany) Roland Mühlbauer (Germany) Wilfried Selbach	BMW 2.5L I6	?	87
73	SP2	157		(Austria) Karl-Heinz Teichmann (Germany) André Kleinschmidt (Germany) Hagen Schwarze (Germany) Markus Hupperich	Suzuki Swift	**Y**	87
73	SP2	157		(Austria) Karl-Heinz Teichmann (Germany) André Kleinschmidt (Germany) Hagen Schwarze (Germany) Markus Hupperich	Suzuki 1.6L I4	**Y**	87
74	V5	217	(Germany) MSC-Rhön e.V. i. AvD	(Italy) Arturo Merzario (Italy) Luigi Scalini (Italy) Luca Zoppini (Austria) Richard Purtscher	BMW M3 GT	**D**	86
74	V5	217	(Germany) MSC-Rhön e.V. i. AvD	(Italy) Arturo Merzario (Italy) Luigi Scalini (Italy) Luca Zoppini (Austria) Richard Purtscher	BMW 3.0L I6	**D**	86
75	SP3	128	(Germany) MSC Mühlheim e.V. i. ADAC	(Germany) Roland Lotzmann (Australia) Denis Cribbin (United States) Paul Jenkins	Honda Civic Type R	?	86
75	SP3	128	(Germany) MSC Mühlheim e.V. i. ADAC	(Germany) Roland Lotzmann (Australia) Denis Cribbin (United States) Paul Jenkins	Honda 2.0L I4	?	86
76	SP4-5	85		(Germany) Holger Fuchs (Greece) Athanasios Karageorgos (Germany) Andre Krumbach	BMW M3	?	86
76	SP4-5	85		(Germany) Holger Fuchs (Greece) Athanasios Karageorgos (Germany) Andre Krumbach	?	?	86
77	V3-V4	196	(Germany) Team DMV	(Germany) Hans Keutmann (United States) Spencer Trenery (United States) Steve Pfeifer (Germany) Frank Kuhlmann	Honda Accord Type R	?	86
77	V3-V4	196	(Germany) Team DMV	(Germany) Hans Keutmann (United States) Spencer Trenery (United States) Steve Pfeifer (Germany) Frank Kuhlmann	Honda 2.2L I4	?	86
78	SP4-5	95		(Germany) Karl Pflanz (Germany) Steffen Wethmar (Germany) Daniel Schwerfeld (Luxembourg) Charles Kauffman	Honda S2000	?	86
78	SP4-5	95		(Germany) Karl Pflanz (Germany) Steffen Wethmar (Germany) Daniel Schwerfeld (Luxembourg) Charles Kauffman	Honda 2.2L I4	?	86
79	V2	184		(Germany) Christian Seewaldt (Germany) Sven Rau (Germany) Marcus Kroll (Netherlands) Jaap Bartels	BMW 318is	?	86
79	V2	184		(Germany) Christian Seewaldt (Germany) Sven Rau (Germany) Marcus Kroll (Netherlands) Jaap Bartels	BMW 1.8L I4	?	86
80	SP2	151		(France) Denis Gaessler (France) Francis Fabbri (France) Christian Lorang	Peugeot 206 CC	?	86
80	SP2	151		(France) Denis Gaessler (France) Francis Fabbri (France) Christian Lorang	Peugeot 2.0L I4	?	86
81	**S2**	**278**		(Germany) **Dietrich Hueck** (Germany) **Frank Diefenbacher** (Germany) **Hubert Nacken** (Germany) **Ellen Lohr**	**Alfa Romeo 147 d**	?	**86**
81	**S2**	**278**		(Germany) **Dietrich Hueck** (Germany) **Frank Diefenbacher** (Germany) **Hubert Nacken** (Germany) **Ellen Lohr**	Alfa Romeo 1.9L I4 Diesel	?	**86**
82	SP3T	90		(Germany) Dierk Möller Sonntag (Germany) Hans-Martin Gass (Germany) Roland Waschkau (Germany) René Rast	Audi A3 2.0	**P**	85
82	SP3T	90		(Germany) Dierk Möller Sonntag (Germany) Hans-Martin Gass (Germany) Roland Waschkau (Germany) René Rast	Audi 2.0L I4	**P**	85
83	SP Cup	234	(Germany) AMC-Diepholz	(Germany) Werner Uetrecht (Germany) Florian Fricke (Germany) Harald Thönnes (Germany) Frank Lohmann	Honda Civic Type R	**BF**	85
83	SP Cup	234	(Germany) AMC-Diepholz	(Germany) Werner Uetrecht (Germany) Florian Fricke (Germany) Harald Thönnes (Germany) Frank Lohmann	Honda 2.0L I4	**BF**	85
84	SP2	159		(Germany) Udo Schütt (Germany) Klaus Derondeau (Germany) Reiner Kuhn (Germany) Gregor Messer	Suzuki Swift Sport	**H**	85
84	SP2	159		(Germany) Udo Schütt (Germany) Klaus Derondeau (Germany) Reiner Kuhn (Germany) Gregor Messer	?	**H**	85
85	SP4T	87		(United States) Mike Rimmer (United States) Chris Rimmer (Australia) Llyndon Riethmuller	Subaru Impreza MZR	?	85
85	SP4T	87		(United States) Mike Rimmer (United States) Chris Rimmer (Australia) Llyndon Riethmuller	?	?	85
86	S2	276		(Germany) Henning Meyersrenken (Germany) Bernd Albrecht (Germany) Norman Starke (Germany) Reinhard Schall	BMW 335d	?	85
86	S2	276		(Germany) Henning Meyersrenken (Germany) Bernd Albrecht (Germany) Norman Starke (Germany) Reinhard Schall	BMW 3.5L I6 Diesel	?	85
87	SP4-5	74		(France) Daniel Dupont (France) Alain Giavedoni (France) Jean Louis Juchault	Porsche 968 GPE	**M**	85
87	SP4-5	74		(France) Daniel Dupont (France) Alain Giavedoni (France) Jean Louis Juchault	?	**M**	85
88	SP6	57		(United Kingdom) Kevin Clarke (United Kingdom) Ian Donaldson (United Kingdom) Mark Donaldson (United Kingdom) Stuart Wright	BMW M3 E46	?	85
88	SP6	57		(United Kingdom) Kevin Clarke (United Kingdom) Ian Donaldson (United Kingdom) Mark Donaldson (United Kingdom) Stuart Wright	BMW 4.0L V8	?	85
89	V3-V4	197		(Germany) Uwe Krumscheid (Germany) Stefan Manheller (Germany) Jürgen Lenarz (United Kingdom) Terry Sayles	BMW 325i	?	84
89	V3-V4	197		(Germany) Uwe Krumscheid (Germany) Stefan Manheller (Germany) Jürgen Lenarz (United Kingdom) Terry Sayles	BMW 2.5L I6	?	84
90	SP4T	88		(Germany) Björn Herrmann (Austria) Nikolaus Mayr-Melnhof (Germany) Mike Martin (Germany) Dirk Kremp	Ford Focus	**Y**	84
90	SP4T	88		(Germany) Björn Herrmann (Austria) Nikolaus Mayr-Melnhof (Germany) Mike Martin (Germany) Dirk Kremp	?	**Y**	84
91	SP8	21	(Germany) Derichs Rennwagen e.V.	(United Kingdom) Keith Ahlers (Austria) Manfred Kubik (Germany) Markus Sedlmaier (Germany) Helmut Undorf	Audi V8 D11	?	84
91	SP8	21	(Germany) Derichs Rennwagen e.V.	(United Kingdom) Keith Ahlers (Austria) Manfred Kubik (Germany) Markus Sedlmaier (Germany) Helmut Undorf	Audi 4.2L V8	?	84
92	SP7	36		(Germany) Wolf Silvester (United Kingdom) Matthew Marsh (Germany) Arne Fittj (Germany) Michael Bonk	Porsche 996 GT3	**Y**	84
92	SP7	36		(Germany) Wolf Silvester (United Kingdom) Matthew Marsh (Germany) Arne Fittj (Germany) Michael Bonk	Porsche 3.6L Flat 6	**Y**	84
93	SP8	9		(Germany) Oliver Mathai (United Kingdom) Richard Meaden (Belgium) Stéphane Lémeret (Germany) Ulrich Schödel	Aston Martin V8 Vantage N24	**Y**	84
93	SP8	9		(Germany) Oliver Mathai (United Kingdom) Richard Meaden (Belgium) Stéphane Lémeret (Germany) Ulrich Schödel	Aston Martin 4.3L V8	**Y**	84
94	V2	180		(Germany) Sebastian Krell (Germany) Johann-Georg Riecker (Germany) Hanjo Hillmann (Germany) Mike Dohmen	BMW 318is Coupe	**Y**	83
94	V2	180		(Germany) Sebastian Krell (Germany) Johann-Georg Riecker (Germany) Hanjo Hillmann (Germany) Mike Dohmen	BMW 1.8L I4	**Y**	83
95	SP3	107		(Germany) Markus Fugel (Germany) Steve Kirsch (Germany) Ruben Zeltner (Germany) Uwe Wächtler	Honda S2000	**K**	83
95	SP3	107		(Germany) Markus Fugel (Germany) Steve Kirsch (Germany) Ruben Zeltner (Germany) Uwe Wächtler	Honda 2.2L I4	**K**	83
96	V2	176	(Germany) Team DMV	(Germany) Jörg Diekriede (United States) Matthew McFadden (Germany) Jochen Senft (Germany) Manfred Anspann	BMW 318is E30	?	83
96	V2	176	(Germany) Team DMV	(Germany) Jörg Diekriede (United States) Matthew McFadden (Germany) Jochen Senft (Germany) Manfred Anspann	BMW 1.8L I4	?	83
97	**SP1**	**166**		(Germany) **Dietrich Dimmler** (Germany) **Axel Potthast** (Germany) **Klaus Weigner** (Germany) **Ulf Carsten Thieler**	**Volkswagen Polo 16V**	?	**83**
97	**SP1**	**166**		(Germany) **Dietrich Dimmler** (Germany) **Axel Potthast** (Germany) **Klaus Weigner** (Germany) **Ulf Carsten Thieler**	Volkswagen 1.4L I4	?	**83**
98	SP6	54	(Italy) Lanza Motorsport	(Italy) Mauro Simoncini (United Kingdom) Alfredo Varini (Italy) Riccardo Bachiorri (Italy) Giovanni Carotenuto	Nissan 350Z	?	83
98	SP6	54	(Italy) Lanza Motorsport	(Italy) Mauro Simoncini (United Kingdom) Alfredo Varini (Italy) Riccardo Bachiorri (Italy) Giovanni Carotenuto	Nissan 3.5L V6	?	83
99	S1	249		(Germany) Paul-Martin Dose (Germany) Gustav Edelhoff (Germany) Bernd Kleeschulte (Germany) Max Kuypers	Volkswagen Golf IV R-TDi Pfl.Öl	**H**	82
99	S1	249		(Germany) Paul-Martin Dose (Germany) Gustav Edelhoff (Germany) Bernd Kleeschulte (Germany) Max Kuypers	Volkswagen 1.9L I4	**H**	82
100	V2	179		(Germany) Michael David (Germany) Thomas Simon (Germany) Reiner Bardenheuer (Germany) Kornelius Hoffmann	BMW 318is	?	82
100	V2	179		(Germany) Michael David (Germany) Thomas Simon (Germany) Reiner Bardenheuer (Germany) Kornelius Hoffmann	BMW 1.8L I4	?	82
101	SP3	121	(Germany) Mathol Racing	(Germany) Eberhard Schneider (Germany) Carsten Dreses (Germany) David Carballeda Dominguez (Denmark) Mike Juul	Honda Civic Type R	?	82
101	SP3	121	(Germany) Mathol Racing	(Germany) Eberhard Schneider (Germany) Carsten Dreses (Germany) David Carballeda Dominguez (Denmark) Mike Juul	Honda 2.0L I4	?	82
102	SP3	129	(Belgium) East Belgian Racing Team	(Belgium) Jacky Delvaux (Belgium) René Marin (Belgium) Gerard Cotteret (France) Fabrice Reicher	Renault Clio RS	?	82
102	SP3	129	(Belgium) East Belgian Racing Team	(Belgium) Jacky Delvaux (Belgium) René Marin (Belgium) Gerard Cotteret (France) Fabrice Reicher	Renault 2.0L I4	?	82
103	V3-V4	188		(Germany) Ralph Caba (Germany) Volker Lange (Germany) Karlheinz Hostenbach	Ford Fiesta ST	?	82
103	V3-V4	188		(Germany) Ralph Caba (Germany) Volker Lange (Germany) Karlheinz Hostenbach	Ford 2.0L I4	?	82
104	SP3	110	(Japan) Team Gazoo	(Japan) Hiromu Naruse (Japan) Minoru Takagi (Japan) Kanami Takeda (Netherlands) Frank Janssen	Toyota Altezza	?	82
104	SP3	110	(Japan) Team Gazoo	(Japan) Hiromu Naruse (Japan) Minoru Takagi (Japan) Kanami Takeda (Netherlands) Frank Janssen	Toyota 2.0L I4	?	82
105	SP4-5	84		(Germany) Willi Friedrichs (Germany) Leo Löwenstein (Germany) Olaf Hoppelshäuser (Germany) Simon Englerth	BMW 130i	**P**	82
105	SP4-5	84		(Germany) Willi Friedrichs (Germany) Leo Löwenstein (Germany) Olaf Hoppelshäuser (Germany) Simon Englerth	BMW 3.0L I6	**P**	82
106	S1	233		(Germany) Eberhard Rattunde (New Zealand) Wayne Moore (New Zealand) Maurice O'Reilly (Germany) Heinrich Immig	Volkswagen Golf V R-TDi	?	81
106	S1	233		(Germany) Eberhard Rattunde (New Zealand) Wayne Moore (New Zealand) Maurice O'Reilly (Germany) Heinrich Immig	Volkswagen 2.0L I4	?	81
107	S1	260	(Germany) pro handicap e.V.	(Germany) Wolfgang Müller (Germany) Frank Breidenstein (France) Olivier Rudolph	Opel Astra Caravan	?	81
107	S1	260	(Germany) pro handicap e.V.	(Germany) Wolfgang Müller (Germany) Frank Breidenstein (France) Olivier Rudolph	Opel 2.0L I4	?	81
108	S1	250		(Germany) Klaus Niedzwiedz (Germany) Henning Klipp (Germany) Christian Schön (Germany) Martin Westerhoff	Honda Civic Hybrid	**BF**	81
108	S1	250		(Germany) Klaus Niedzwiedz (Germany) Henning Klipp (Germany) Christian Schön (Germany) Martin Westerhoff	Honda 1.3L I4 Hybrid	**BF**	81
109	SP3	13	(Australia) Osborne Motorsport	(Australia) Colin Osborne (Australia) Paul Stubber (Australia) William Sherwood	Toyota Corolla	?	81
109	SP3	13	(Australia) Osborne Motorsport	(Australia) Colin Osborne (Australia) Paul Stubber (Australia) William Sherwood	?	?	81
110			(Japan) Team Gazoo	(Japan) "Morizo" (Japan) Masato Eto (Japan) Yasuo Hirata (Japan) Yoshinobu Katsumata	Toyota Altezza	?	80
110			(Japan) Team Gazoo	(Japan) "Morizo" (Japan) Masato Eto (Japan) Yasuo Hirata (Japan) Yoshinobu Katsumata	?	?	80
111	SP8	20	(Germany) Derichs Rennwagen e.V.	(Germany) Matthias Schenzle (Germany) Andrea Kammerl (Germany) Erwin Derichs (Sweden) Gunnar Turebrand	Mercedes-Benz W126	?	80
111	SP8	20	(Germany) Derichs Rennwagen e.V.	(Germany) Matthias Schenzle (Germany) Andrea Kammerl (Germany) Erwin Derichs (Sweden) Gunnar Turebrand	?	?	80
112	SP4-5	73		(Germany) Oswald Burgstaller (Germany) Willi Herold (Germany) Jürgen Gerlach (Germany) Frank Michel	BMW M3 E36	**D**	79
112	SP4-5	73		(Germany) Oswald Burgstaller (Germany) Willi Herold (Germany) Jürgen Gerlach (Germany) Frank Michel	BMW 3.0L I6	**D**	79
113	SP7	32		(Germany) Daniel Lemm (Germany) Jürgen Bach (Germany) Kersten Jodexnis (Germany) Wolfgang Destree	Porsche 996 GT3 Cup	?	79
113	SP7	32		(Germany) Daniel Lemm (Germany) Jürgen Bach (Germany) Kersten Jodexnis (Germany) Wolfgang Destree	Porsche 3.6L Flat 6	?	79
114	SP4-5	82	(Germany) VLN Honda Junior Team-FH Köln Motorsport	(Germany) Christian Leitheuser (Germany) Torsten Krey (Germany) Christian Schmidt (Germany) Harald Schlotter	BMW M3 E46	**D**	79
114	SP4-5	82	(Germany) VLN Honda Junior Team-FH Köln Motorsport	(Germany) Christian Leitheuser (Germany) Torsten Krey (Germany) Christian Schmidt (Germany) Harald Schlotter	?	**D**	79
115	S1	257		(Germany) Marc Hoyer (Germany) Ralf Kraus (United States) Jim Briody (Germany) Uwe Schäfer	Volkswagen Golf GT	**P**	78
115	S1	257		(Germany) Marc Hoyer (Germany) Ralf Kraus (United States) Jim Briody (Germany) Uwe Schäfer	?	**P**	78
116	V3-V4	187		(Germany) Marc Kippschull (Germany) Falko L'Hounneux (Germany) Norbert Werner (Germany) Karsten Schmitt	Opel Astra	?	78
116	V3-V4	187		(Germany) Marc Kippschull (Germany) Falko L'Hounneux (Germany) Norbert Werner (Germany) Karsten Schmitt	?	?	78
117	SP7	99		(Germany) Stefan Biel (Germany) Pierre Kaffer (Germany) Norbert Fischer (Germany) Daniel Zils	Porsche Cayman RS	?	78
117	SP7	99		(Germany) Stefan Biel (Germany) Pierre Kaffer (Germany) Norbert Fischer (Germany) Daniel Zils	?	?	78
118	SP Cup	231	(Germany) Mathol-Racing	(Germany) Oliver Lembeck (Germany) Nikolaus Hardt (Germany) Berthold Bermel (Germany) Thomas Stoltz	Honda Civic Type R	?	78
118	SP Cup	231	(Germany) Mathol-Racing	(Germany) Oliver Lembeck (Germany) Nikolaus Hardt (Germany) Berthold Bermel (Germany) Thomas Stoltz	Honda 2.0L I4	?	78
119	SP7	11		(Germany) Gary Williams (Germany) Daniel Cooke (United Kingdom) Julian Perry (United Kingdom) Trevor Reeves	Porsche 997 GT3	**M**	77
119	SP7	11		(Germany) Gary Williams (Germany) Daniel Cooke (United Kingdom) Julian Perry (United Kingdom) Trevor Reeves	Porsche 3.6L Flat 6	**M**	77
120	V2	173	(Germany) Pistenclub e.V.	(Germany) Frank Aust (Switzerland) Benedikt Frei (Switzerland) Stefan Abegg	BMW 318 Ti Compact	**Y**	77
120	V2	173	(Germany) Pistenclub e.V.	(Germany) Frank Aust (Switzerland) Benedikt Frei (Switzerland) Stefan Abegg	?	**Y**	77
121	SP Cup	230	(Germany) Mathol-Racing	(Germany) Matthias Holle (United Kingdom) Jacob Thomsen (Norway) Stewart Lauersen (Denmark) Jan Kalmar	Honda Civic Type R	**BF**	77
121	SP Cup	230	(Germany) Mathol-Racing	(Germany) Matthias Holle (United Kingdom) Jacob Thomsen (Norway) Stewart Lauersen (Denmark) Jan Kalmar	Honda 2.0L I4	**BF**	77
122	S1	258		(Germany) Christian Görke (Germany) Theo Milz (Germany) Andreas Leue	Volkswagen Polo Mk4	?	77
122	S1	258		(Germany) Christian Görke (Germany) Theo Milz (Germany) Andreas Leue	Volkswagen 2.0L I4	?	77
123	V3-V4	189	(Germany) Team DMV	(Germany) Hans-Christoph Schäfer (Germany) Dirk Leßmeister (Germany) Marc Holtschneider (Germany) Maik Pötzl	SEAT Ibiza	?	77
123	V3-V4	189	(Germany) Team DMV	(Germany) Hans-Christoph Schäfer (Germany) Dirk Leßmeister (Germany) Marc Holtschneider (Germany) Maik Pötzl	?	?	77
124	SP1	164		(Germany) Peter Teichmann (Germany) Michael Schneider (Germany) Christian Tschornia (Germany) Jürgen Müller	Daihatsu Sirion	**Y**	79
124	SP1	164		(Germany) Peter Teichmann (Germany) Michael Schneider (Germany) Christian Tschornia (Germany) Jürgen Müller	?	**Y**	79
125	SP3	116	(Germany) Pistenclub e.V.	(Germany) Volker Sackreuther (Germany) Karsten Dempert (Germany) Rainer Hamacher (Germany) Willi Volz	Ford Puma Cup	?	79
125	SP3	116	(Germany) Pistenclub e.V.	(Germany) Volker Sackreuther (Germany) Karsten Dempert (Germany) Rainer Hamacher (Germany) Willi Volz	?	?	79
126	SP8	8		(Germany) Ulrich Bez (United Kingdom) Chris Porritt (Germany) Wolfgang Schuhbauer (Germany) Horst von Saurma	Aston Martin V8 Vantage N24	**Y**	79
126	SP8	8		(Germany) Ulrich Bez (United Kingdom) Chris Porritt (Germany) Wolfgang Schuhbauer (Germany) Horst von Saurma	Aston Martin 4.3L V8	**Y**	79
127	V3-V4	198		(Germany) Jörg Etz (Germany) Markus Etz (Norway) Einar Thorsen (Germany) Günter Memminger	BMW 325i	?	75
127	V3-V4	198		(Germany) Jörg Etz (Germany) Markus Etz (Norway) Einar Thorsen (Germany) Günter Memminger	BMW 2.5L I6	?	75
128	S1	267		(France) Franck Grossetéte (France) Philippe Géhin (France) Christophe Porcher	Renault Mégane RS	**Y**	74
128	S1	267		(France) Franck Grossetéte (France) Philippe Géhin (France) Christophe Porcher	Renault 2.0L I4	**Y**	74
129	SP1	162		(Germany) Heinz-Jürgen Winz (Germany) Sandra Winz (Germany) Dirk Kisters	Fiat Punto	?	74
129	SP1	162		(Germany) Heinz-Jürgen Winz (Germany) Sandra Winz (Germany) Dirk Kisters	Fiat 1.8L I4	?	74
130	S1	256	(Germany) Classic Driver	(Germany) Christian Eigen (Germany) Julia Drewes (Germany) Timo Frings	Volkswagen Golf Mk5	**D**	74
130	S1	256	(Germany) Classic Driver	(Germany) Christian Eigen (Germany) Julia Drewes (Germany) Timo Frings	?	**D**	74
131	S2	274	(Italy) Lanza Motorsport	(Italy) Giovanni Carotenuto (Italy) Mauro Simoncini (Italy) Mario Oldani (Italy) Edo Varini	BMW 330d E46	?	73
131	S2	274	(Italy) Lanza Motorsport	(Italy) Giovanni Carotenuto (Italy) Mauro Simoncini (Italy) Mario Oldani (Italy) Edo Varini	BMW 3.0L I6 Diesel	?	73
132	S2	275	(Germany) Team DMV e.V.	(Switzerland) Stefan Neuhorn (Germany) Elmar Brunsch (Germany) Ralf-Udo Blöding (Germany) Kurt Lotz	Ford Focus ST Bio-Ethanol	**K**	73
132	S2	275	(Germany) Team DMV e.V.	(Switzerland) Stefan Neuhorn (Germany) Elmar Brunsch (Germany) Ralf-Udo Blöding (Germany) Kurt Lotz	?	**K**	73
133	SP2	158		(Germany) Mike Schedler (Germany) Martin Mechtersheimer (Germany) Tilman Spengler	SEAT Ibiza 6K	?	73
133	SP2	158		(Germany) Mike Schedler (Germany) Martin Mechtersheimer (Germany) Tilman Spengler	SEAT 2.0L I4	?	73
134	SP2	153		(Germany) Manfred Duske (Germany) Bernd Erdmann (Germany) Michael Milz (Germany) Reiner Habeth	Citroën Saxo	?	73
134	SP2	153		(Germany) Manfred Duske (Germany) Bernd Erdmann (Germany) Michael Milz (Germany) Reiner Habeth	Citroën 1.6L I4	?	73
135	SP4-5	70		(Sweden) Hans Andreasson (Sweden) Mikael Redsäter (Sweden) Inge Andersson (Sweden) Christer Pernvall	Porsche 944 S2	?	73
135	SP4-5	70		(Sweden) Hans Andreasson (Sweden) Mikael Redsäter (Sweden) Inge Andersson (Sweden) Christer Pernvall	Porsche 3.0L I4	?	73
136	S1	259	(Germany) MSC Ruhr Blitz Bochum e.V.	(Netherlands) Martin de Groot (Germany) Rüdiger Förster (Germany) Uwe Göbel (Germany) Rolf Kienen	Alfa Romeo 147	?	72
136	S1	259	(Germany) MSC Ruhr Blitz Bochum e.V.	(Netherlands) Martin de Groot (Germany) Rüdiger Förster (Germany) Uwe Göbel (Germany) Rolf Kienen	Alfa Romeo 1.9L I4 Diesel	?	72
137	SP4-5	81	(Germany) Live-Strip.com Racing	(Germany) Ferfried von Hohenzollern (Germany) Ronny Melkus (Germany) Ulrich Neuser (Austria) Ronny Mai	BMW 3 Series Compact	**K**	72
137	SP4-5	81	(Germany) Live-Strip.com Racing	(Germany) Ferfried von Hohenzollern (Germany) Ronny Melkus (Germany) Ulrich Neuser (Austria) Ronny Mai	BMW 2.5L I6	**K**	72
138	SP1	168		(Germany) Michael Brüggenkamp (Luxembourg) Mike Schmidt (United Kingdom) Rhodri Hughes (Japan) Kenichi Maejima	Suzuki Swift GTi	?	71
138	SP1	168		(Germany) Michael Brüggenkamp (Luxembourg) Mike Schmidt (United Kingdom) Rhodri Hughes (Japan) Kenichi Maejima	?	?	71
139	N1-N2	222		(Norway) Ola Setsaas (Norway) Jörgen Pettersen (Norway) Mikjel Svae	Honda Civic Type R	?	71
139	N1-N2	222		(Norway) Ola Setsaas (Norway) Jörgen Pettersen (Norway) Mikjel Svae	Honda 2.0L I4	?	71
140	S1	253		(Australia) Martin Bailey (Australia) Greg Doyle (Australia) Allan Shephard (Australia) Ross Lilley	Renault Clio RS	**Y**	70
140	S1	253		(Australia) Martin Bailey (Australia) Greg Doyle (Australia) Allan Shephard (Australia) Ross Lilley	Renault 2.0L I4	**Y**	70
141	SP3T	92		(Germany) Otto Hofmayer (Portugal) Francisco Mora (Hungary) Paul Singer (Germany) Thorsten Unger	Audi A3 2.0	**P**	69
141	SP3T	92		(Germany) Otto Hofmayer (Portugal) Francisco Mora (Hungary) Paul Singer (Germany) Thorsten Unger	Audi 2.0L I4	**P**	69
142	SP3T	91		(Germany) Thomas Kroher (Germany) Thiemo Fleck (Germany) Christian Gebhardt (Germany) Stefan Küster	Audi A3 2.0	**P**	69
142	SP3T	91		(Germany) Thomas Kroher (Germany) Thiemo Fleck (Germany) Christian Gebhardt (Germany) Stefan Küster	Audi 2.0L I4	**P**	69
143	S2	271		(Germany) Franz Groß (Germany) "Bugs Bunny" (Germany) Christian Steffens (Germany) Markus Horn	BMW 135d BioDiesel	**Y**	67
143	S2	271		(Germany) Franz Groß (Germany) "Bugs Bunny" (Germany) Christian Steffens (Germany) Markus Horn	BMW 3.5L I6	**Y**	67
144	SP3	133		(Germany) Ralf Zensen (Germany) Lothar Wilms (Germany) Christopher Peters	Lotus Elise	?	66
144	SP3	133		(Germany) Ralf Zensen (Germany) Lothar Wilms (Germany) Christopher Peters	Toyota 1.8L I4	?	66
145	SP4-5	78		(Germany) Roland Waschkau (Germany) Rudi Speich (Germany) Burkhard Scheffler (Germany) Klaus Hormes	Audi A3	**Y**	66
145	SP4-5	78		(Germany) Roland Waschkau (Germany) Rudi Speich (Germany) Burkhard Scheffler (Germany) Klaus Hormes	?	**Y**	66
146	S1	265	(Germany) ADAC Weser-Ems e.V. i. ADAC	(Germany) Andreas von der Haar (Germany) Marcus Bulgrin (Germany) Maik Kruse	Volkswagen Golf IV TDi	?	65
146	S1	265	(Germany) ADAC Weser-Ems e.V. i. ADAC	(Germany) Andreas von der Haar (Germany) Marcus Bulgrin (Germany) Maik Kruse	Volkswagen 1.9L I4	?	65
147	SP2	155		(Australia) Richard Gartner (Italy) Giuseppe Arlotti (Italy) Bruno Barbaro (Italy) Gianni Giudici	Mitsubishi Mirage	?	65
147	SP2	155		(Australia) Richard Gartner (Italy) Giuseppe Arlotti (Italy) Bruno Barbaro (Italy) Gianni Giudici	?	?	65
148	S1	262	(Germany) Motorsport Arena Oschersleben	(Norway) Nils Tronrud (Norway) Anders Burchardt (Sweden) Arne Berg	BMW 120d	**D**	63
148	S1	262	(Germany) Motorsport Arena Oschersleben	(Norway) Nils Tronrud (Norway) Anders Burchardt (Sweden) Arne Berg	BMW 2.0L I4 Diesel	**D**	63
149	S1	252	(Germany) ORMS Racing-Wiesmann	(Germany) Hans Hahnel (Germany) Christian Feineis (Czech Republic) Remo Friberg (Germany) Herbert Schürg	Alfa Romeo 147 JTD	?	63
149	S1	252	(Germany) ORMS Racing-Wiesmann	(Germany) Hans Hahnel (Germany) Christian Feineis (Czech Republic) Remo Friberg (Germany) Herbert Schürg	Alfa Romeo 1.9L I4 Diesel	?	63
150	V3-V4	202		(Germany) Heinz-Willi Delzepich (Germany) Jörg Kosmalla (Germany) Uwe Karp	BMW 325i E46	?	62
150	V3-V4	202		(Germany) Heinz-Willi Delzepich (Germany) Jörg Kosmalla (Germany) Uwe Karp	BMW 2.5L I6	?	62
151	V2	177		(Germany) Rudolf Rank (Germany) Michael Rank (Germany) Jochen Vollmer (Germany) Jürgen Glath	Opel Corsa Sport	**D**	59
151	V2	177		(Germany) Rudolf Rank (Germany) Michael Rank (Germany) Jochen Vollmer (Germany) Jürgen Glath	?	**D**	59
152	S2	270	(Germany) Renngemeinschaft Berg. Gladbach e.V.	(Germany) Thomas Haider (Germany) Rainer Kutsch (Germany) Marc Hiltscher (Germany) Jutta Kleinschmidt	BMW 330d	**M**	57
152	S2	270	(Germany) Renngemeinschaft Berg. Gladbach e.V.	(Germany) Thomas Haider (Germany) Rainer Kutsch (Germany) Marc Hiltscher (Germany) Jutta Kleinschmidt	BMW 3.0L I6 Diesel	**M**	57
153	SP1	167		(Germany) Jürgen Bussmann (Japan) Izumi Yoshida (Japan) Akihiko Fujioka (Japan) Hiroyuki Kishimoto	Suzuki Swift GTR	?	57
153	SP1	167		(Germany) Jürgen Bussmann (Japan) Izumi Yoshida (Japan) Akihiko Fujioka (Japan) Hiroyuki Kishimoto	?	?	57
154	SP3T	106	(Germany) MS Racing	(Germany) Martin Tschornia (Denmark) Nicki Thiim (Germany) Florian Stoll (Switzerland) Paul Hunsperger	SEAT León Supercopa	**Y**	56
154	SP3T	106	(Germany) MS Racing	(Germany) Martin Tschornia (Denmark) Nicki Thiim (Germany) Florian Stoll (Switzerland) Paul Hunsperger	?	**Y**	56
155	SP3	127		(Germany) Walter Nawotka (Germany) Gerd Grundmann	Honda S2000	?	56
155	SP3	127		(Germany) Walter Nawotka (Germany) Gerd Grundmann	?	?	56
156	S2	272		(Germany) Patrick Brenndörfer (Germany) Martin Müller (Germany) Frank Eickholt	Volvo HS4	**T**	56
156	S2	272		(Germany) Patrick Brenndörfer (Germany) Martin Müller (Germany) Frank Eickholt	?	**T**	56

35. ADAC Zurich 24h Rennen
Pos	Class	No	Team	Drivers	Chassis	Tyre	Laps
Pos	Class	No	Team	Drivers	Engine	Tyre	Laps
DNF	SP3T	101	(Germany) Volkswagen Motorsport	(Germany) Ulrich Hackenberg (Germany) Dieter Depping (Belgium) François Verbist (Germany) Bernd Ostmann	Volkswagen Golf Mk5	**M**	96
DNF	SP3T	101	(Germany) Volkswagen Motorsport	(Germany) Ulrich Hackenberg (Germany) Dieter Depping (Belgium) François Verbist (Germany) Bernd Ostmann	?	**M**	96
DNF	SP4-5	83		(Germany) Franz Rohr (Sweden) Gunnar Dackevall (Germany) Gerhard Ludwig (Germany) Michael Zehe	Audi A3 Turbo	?	93
DNF	SP4-5	83		(Germany) Franz Rohr (Sweden) Gunnar Dackevall (Germany) Gerhard Ludwig (Germany) Michael Zehe	Audi 2.0L I4	?	93
DNF	SP Cup	229		(Switzerland) Peter Rikli (Belgium) Jean-Francois Stoeckli (Germany) Andreas Weiland (Germany) Ralph-Peter Rink	Honda Civic Type R	**BF**	93
DNF	SP Cup	229		(Switzerland) Peter Rikli (Belgium) Jean-Francois Stoeckli (Germany) Andreas Weiland (Germany) Ralph-Peter Rink	Honda 2.0L I4	**BF**	93
DNF	SP3T	104	(Germany) Kissling Motorsport	(Finland) Hannu Luostarinen (Germany) Marcus Schurig (Germany) Jochen Übler (Germany) Tom Nack	Opel Astra GTC	**D**	90
DNF	SP3T	104	(Germany) Kissling Motorsport	(Finland) Hannu Luostarinen (Germany) Marcus Schurig (Germany) Jochen Übler (Germany) Tom Nack	Opel 2.0L I4	**D**	90
DNF	SP Cup	228		(Germany) Michael Ecker (Germany) Wilfried Schmitz (Belgium) Marcel Engels (Germany) Kim Berwanger	Honda Civic Type R	**BF**	90
DNF	SP Cup	228		(Germany) Michael Ecker (Germany) Wilfried Schmitz (Belgium) Marcel Engels (Germany) Kim Berwanger	Honda 2.0L I4	**BF**	90
DNF	S1	266	(Germany) H&R Spezialfedern	(Germany) Kai Jordan (Germany) Ralph Bohnhorst (Austria) Andreas Waldherr (Germany) Mario Merten	Volkswagen Golf Mk5	?	78
DNF	S1	266	(Germany) H&R Spezialfedern	(Germany) Kai Jordan (Germany) Ralph Bohnhorst (Austria) Andreas Waldherr (Germany) Mario Merten	?	?	78
DNF	SP7	27		(Australia) Shaun Juniper (Australia) Max Twigg (Australia) John Teulan (New Zealand) Paul Kelly	Porsche 996	**M**	77
DNF	SP7	27		(Australia) Shaun Juniper (Australia) Max Twigg (Australia) John Teulan (New Zealand) Paul Kelly	Porsche 3.6L Flat 6	**M**	77
DNF	SP8	007	Phoenix Racing/Aston Martin Austria	(Germany) Klaus Ludwig (Switzerland) Marcel Fässler (Germany) Sascha Bert	Aston Martin DBRS9	**M**	75
DNF	SP8	007	Phoenix Racing/Aston Martin Austria	(Germany) Klaus Ludwig (Switzerland) Marcel Fässler (Germany) Sascha Bert	Aston Martin 5.9L V12	**M**	75
DNF	SP7	24	(Germany) steam-racing GMBH	(Germany) Markus Lungstrass (Germany) Johannes Siegler (Germany) Stephan Dröger (Slovakia) Miro Konôpka	Porsche 997 GT3 RS	**M**	74
DNF	SP7	24	(Germany) steam-racing GMBH	(Germany) Markus Lungstrass (Germany) Johannes Siegler (Germany) Stephan Dröger (Slovakia) Miro Konôpka	Porsche 3.6L Flat 6	**M**	74
DNF	SP3	132		(Germany) Andreas Dingert (Germany) Rüdiger Bernhard (Germany) Reiner Zimmermann	Volkswagen Golf III Kit Car	?	72
DNF	SP3	132		(Germany) Andreas Dingert (Germany) Rüdiger Bernhard (Germany) Reiner Zimmermann	?	?	72
DNF	SP2	160	(Germany) Team Lauderbach Motorsport	(Germany) Ralf Martin (Germany) Moritz Bahlsen (Germany) Christian Haarmann (Germany) Christian Kosbu	Ford Fiesta	**Y**	71
DNF	SP2	160	(Germany) Team Lauderbach Motorsport	(Germany) Ralf Martin (Germany) Moritz Bahlsen (Germany) Christian Haarmann (Germany) Christian Kosbu	?	**Y**	71
DNF	SP3	124		(Italy) Massimiliano Milli (Italy) Umberto Nacamuli (Italy) Luigi Emiliani	Renault Clio RS	?	70
DNF	SP3	124		(Italy) Massimiliano Milli (Italy) Umberto Nacamuli (Italy) Luigi Emiliani	Renault 2.0L I4	?	70
DNF	SP6	65	(United Kingdom) RJN Motorsports	(Denmark) Kurt Thiim (Germany) Nicole Lütticke (Germany) Holger Eckhardt (Germany) Tim Schrick	Nissan 350Z	?	69
DNF	SP6	65	(United Kingdom) RJN Motorsports	(Denmark) Kurt Thiim (Germany) Nicole Lütticke (Germany) Holger Eckhardt (Germany) Tim Schrick	Nissan 3.5L V6	?	69
DNF	SP3	112		(Germany) Cyril Kalbassi (Germany) Oluf Bendixen (Germany) Fabian Ottmann (Germany) Patrik Ponec	Honda Accord Euro R	?	68
DNF	SP3	112		(Germany) Cyril Kalbassi (Germany) Oluf Bendixen (Germany) Fabian Ottmann (Germany) Patrik Ponec	Honda 2.4L I4	?	68
DNF	SP7	38		(United Kingdom) Chris Copper (United Kingdom) Guy Spurr (United Kingdom) Chris Harris	Porsche 997	?	67
DNF	SP7	38		(United Kingdom) Chris Copper (United Kingdom) Guy Spurr (United Kingdom) Chris Harris	Porsche 3.6L Flat 6	?	67
DNF	SP6	51		(United Kingdom) Willie Moore (United Kingdom) Rupert Douglas-Pennant (United Kingdom) Nick Jacobs	BMW M3 E46	?	67
DNF	SP6	51		(United Kingdom) Willie Moore (United Kingdom) Rupert Douglas-Pennant (United Kingdom) Nick Jacobs	BMW 4.0L V8	?	67
DNF	V5	211		(Germany) Peter Posavac (Germany) Jürgen Steiner (Germany) Jürgen Dinstühler	BMW 130i E87	?	65
DNF	V5	211		(Germany) Peter Posavac (Germany) Jürgen Steiner (Germany) Jürgen Dinstühler	BMW 3.0L I6	?	65
DNF	SP Cup	235	(Germany) Fuchs-Personal-Team-Nett	(Germany) Jürgen Nett (Germany) Rolf Schütz (Germany) Thomas Reuter	Honda Civic Type R	**BF**	64
DNF	SP Cup	235	(Germany) Fuchs-Personal-Team-Nett	(Germany) Jürgen Nett (Germany) Rolf Schütz (Germany) Thomas Reuter	Honda 2.0L I4	**BF**	64
DNF	SP7	40	(Germany) Matador Rennsport-Team Deutschland	(Germany) Alex Roloff (Germany) Dominik Schwager (Germany) Jan-Erik Slooten (Germany) Peter Scharmach	Porsche 997 GT3	?	58
DNF	SP7	40	(Germany) Matador Rennsport-Team Deutschland	(Germany) Alex Roloff (Germany) Dominik Schwager (Germany) Jan-Erik Slooten (Germany) Peter Scharmach	Porsche 3.6L Flat 6	?	58
DNF	SP6	55		(Germany) Elmar Deegener (Germany) Jürgen Wohlfahrt (Germany) Christoph Breuer (Germany) Joachim Kiesch	Mitsubishi Lancer Evo VIII	**D**	58
DNF	SP6	55		(Germany) Elmar Deegener (Germany) Jürgen Wohlfahrt (Germany) Christoph Breuer (Germany) Joachim Kiesch	?	**D**	58
DNF	SP3T	98		(Germany) Gerhard Ludwig (Germany) Thomas Wiedenmeier (Germany) Karsten French (Germany) Franz-Xavier Rohr	Toyota MR2	?	58
DNF	SP3T	98		(Germany) Gerhard Ludwig (Germany) Thomas Wiedenmeier (Germany) Karsten French (Germany) Franz-Xavier Rohr	Toyota 1.8L I4	?	58
DNF	SP7	42		(Germany) Stefan Kohlstrung (Germany) Nicolai Wahl (Germany) Wolfgang Drabiniok (Germany) Winfried Bär	Porsche 996 GT3 Cup	?	54
DNF	SP7	42		(Germany) Stefan Kohlstrung (Germany) Nicolai Wahl (Germany) Wolfgang Drabiniok (Germany) Winfried Bär	Porsche 3.6L Flat 6	?	54
DNF	V3-V4	205		(Germany) Thomas Kleinwächte (Germany) Marc Walz (Germany) Horst Lars Müller	BMW 325i E36	?	54
DNF	V3-V4	205		(Germany) Thomas Kleinwächte (Germany) Marc Walz (Germany) Horst Lars Müller	BMW 2.5L I6	?	54
DNF	V2	181	(Germany) H&R Spezialfedern GmbH	(Germany) Joachim Steidel (Japan) Hisanao Kurata (Germany) Jochen Werner (Germany) Carola Esser-Feyen	Honda Civic 1.8	?	53
DNF	V2	181	(Germany) H&R Spezialfedern GmbH	(Germany) Joachim Steidel (Japan) Hisanao Kurata (Germany) Jochen Werner (Germany) Carola Esser-Feyen	Honda 1.8L I4	?	53
DNF	SP3	135		(Germany) Sven Kurtenbach (Germany) Stefan Hübenthal (Germany) Michael Nolte (Germany) Wolfgang Hönscheid	Volkswagen Golf III 16V	?	52
DNF	SP3	135		(Germany) Sven Kurtenbach (Germany) Stefan Hübenthal (Germany) Michael Nolte (Germany) Wolfgang Hönscheid	Volkswagen 2.0L I4	?	52
DNF	SP6	68		(Germany) Marco Schelp (France) Arnaud Peyroles (France) Jean Baptiste Chretien (Germany) Frank Kräling	BMW M3 E46	?	51
DNF	SP6	68		(Germany) Marco Schelp (France) Arnaud Peyroles (France) Jean Baptiste Chretien (Germany) Frank Kräling	BMW 4.0L V8	?	51
DNF	V3-V4	201		(Germany) Herbert Scheuermann (Germany) Torsten Kratz (Denmark) Holger Knudsen (Germany) Thomas Mundorf	BMW 325i	**D**	51
DNF	V3-V4	201		(Germany) Herbert Scheuermann (Germany) Torsten Kratz (Denmark) Holger Knudsen (Germany) Thomas Mundorf	BMW 2.5L I6	**D**	51
DNF	SP3	114		(Germany) Christian Benz (Germany) Stefan Benz	Renault Clio	?	50
DNF	SP3	114		(Germany) Christian Benz (Germany) Stefan Benz	?	?	50
DNF	SP3	131		(Germany) Frank Allendorf (Switzerland) Alexander Wetzlich (Germany) Thomas Sluis (Germany) Clemens Pictzkowski	Ford Puma	**D**	50
DNF	SP3	131		(Germany) Frank Allendorf (Switzerland) Alexander Wetzlich (Germany) Thomas Sluis (Germany) Clemens Pictzkowski	?	**D**	50
DNF	SP3	123		(Italy) Max Papis (Italy) Francesco Ragozzino (Italy) Alexander Bolognesi (Italy) Sergio Negroni	Renault Clio	?	49
DNF	SP3	123		(Italy) Max Papis (Italy) Francesco Ragozzino (Italy) Alexander Bolognesi (Italy) Sergio Negroni	?	?	49
DNF	V3-V4	203		(United Kingdom) Christer Hallgren (United Kingdom) Meyrick Cox (United Kingdom) Anthony Coxon (United Kingdom) Myles Packman	Honda Accord	?	48
DNF	V3-V4	203		(United Kingdom) Christer Hallgren (United Kingdom) Meyrick Cox (United Kingdom) Anthony Coxon (United Kingdom) Myles Packman	?	?	48
DNF	SP1	165		(Austria) Karl-Heinz Teichmann (Germany) Michael Schneider (Germany) Peter Kreuer	Suzuki Swift	?	48
DNF	SP1	165		(Austria) Karl-Heinz Teichmann (Germany) Michael Schneider (Germany) Peter Kreuer	?	?	48
DNF	SP7	14	(Germany) Manthey Racing GmbH	(Germany) Sabine Schmitz (Germany) Klaus Abbelen (Germany) Edgar Althoff	Porsche 997 GT3	**Y**	47
DNF	SP7	14	(Germany) Manthey Racing GmbH	(Germany) Sabine Schmitz (Germany) Klaus Abbelen (Germany) Edgar Althoff	Porsche 3.6L Flat 6	**Y**	47
DNF	SP7	41	(Germany) Scuderia Colonia e.V.	(Germany) Hans Peter Richrath (Spain) Ralf Schnitzler (Germany) Matthias Wasel (Luxembourg) Georges Kuhn	Porsche 964 Carrera RS	?	44
DNF	SP7	41	(Germany) Scuderia Colonia e.V.	(Germany) Hans Peter Richrath (Spain) Ralf Schnitzler (Germany) Matthias Wasel (Luxembourg) Georges Kuhn	Porsche 3.3L Flat 6	?	44
DNF	V5	209		(Germany) David Ackermann (Germany) Lutz Wolzenburg (Germany) Friedrich Ungnadner (Germany) Axel Duffner	BMW M3	?	44
DNF	V5	209		(Germany) David Ackermann (Germany) Lutz Wolzenburg (Germany) Friedrich Ungnadner (Germany) Axel Duffner	?	?	44
DNF	S1	251		(Germany) Werner Habermehl (Germany) Dietrich Hueck (Germany) Martin Richter (New Zealand) Elton Goonan	Alfa Romeo GT	**K**	43
DNF	S1	251		(Germany) Werner Habermehl (Germany) Dietrich Hueck (Germany) Martin Richter (New Zealand) Elton Goonan	Alfa Romeo 2.0L I4	**K**	43
DNF	SP Cup	227		(Austria) Daniela Schmid (Germany) Anja Wassertheurer (Germany) Frederike Moritz	Honda Civic Type R	**BF**	43
DNF	SP Cup	227		(Austria) Daniela Schmid (Germany) Anja Wassertheurer (Germany) Frederike Moritz	Honda 2.0L I4	**BF**	43
DNF	S2	277		(Germany) Heribert Steiner (Germany) Alexander Trojan (Germany) Dieter Lindenbaum (Germany) Victor Smolski	BMW 335d	?	42
DNF	S2	277		(Germany) Heribert Steiner (Germany) Alexander Trojan (Germany) Dieter Lindenbaum (Germany) Victor Smolski	BMW 3.5L I6 Diesel	?	42
DNF	SP3	125	(Germany) Fun Motorsports	(Germany) Armin Holz (Germany) Joachim Müller (Germany) Lars Döhmann	Volkswagen Golf III GTi 16V	?	42
DNF	SP3	125	(Germany) Fun Motorsports	(Germany) Armin Holz (Germany) Joachim Müller (Germany) Lars Döhmann	Volkswagen 2.0L I4	?	42
DNF	SP8	18		(Germany) Hermann Tilke (Germany) Dirk Adorf (Germany) Peter Oberndorfer (Germany) Markus Großmann	Lamborghini Gallardo	**D**	41
DNF	SP8	18		(Germany) Hermann Tilke (Germany) Dirk Adorf (Germany) Peter Oberndorfer (Germany) Markus Großmann	Lamborghini 5.0L V10	**D**	41
DNF	SP6	61	(Sweden) Carlsson Racing	(Germany) Rainer Brückner (Sweden) Ingvar Carlsson (Russia) Vitaly Dudin (Russia) Vadim Kharlov	Mercedes-Benz SLK Carlsson C3	**D**	41
DNF	SP6	61	(Sweden) Carlsson Racing	(Germany) Rainer Brückner (Sweden) Ingvar Carlsson (Russia) Vitaly Dudin (Russia) Vadim Kharlov	Mercedes-Benz 3.5L V6	**D**	41
DNF	SP7	39	(Sweden) Levin Racing	(Sweden) Martin Morin (Sweden) Carl Rydquist (Sweden) Ulf Mattsson (Sweden) Peter Thelin	Porsche 996 GT3-RS	**M**	38
DNF	SP7	39	(Sweden) Levin Racing	(Sweden) Martin Morin (Sweden) Carl Rydquist (Sweden) Ulf Mattsson (Sweden) Peter Thelin	Porsche 3.6L Flat 6	**M**	38
DNF	SP8	17		(Germany) Christian Kohlhaas (Germany) Sven Fisch (Germany) Dirk Riebensahm (Italy) Giampaolo Tenchini	Audi RS 4	**P**	38
DNF	SP8	17		(Germany) Christian Kohlhaas (Germany) Sven Fisch (Germany) Dirk Riebensahm (Italy) Giampaolo Tenchini	Audi 4.2L V8	**P**	38
DNF	S1	254		(Netherlands) Gerrie Willems (Netherlands) Ivo Breukers (Netherlands) Henk Thijssen (Netherlands) Ton Verkoelen	SEAT León 1.9 TDi	**T**	38
DNF	S1	254		(Netherlands) Gerrie Willems (Netherlands) Ivo Breukers (Netherlands) Henk Thijssen (Netherlands) Ton Verkoelen	SEAT 1.9L I4	**T**	38
DNF	V2	174	(Germany) Team DMV	(Germany) Michael Albertz (Germany) Manfred Beckers (Germany) Gerhard Erregger (Germany) Ralf Glatzel	SEAT Ibiza	?	37
DNF	V2	174	(Germany) Team DMV	(Germany) Michael Albertz (Germany) Manfred Beckers (Germany) Gerhard Erregger (Germany) Ralf Glatzel	SEAT 1.8L I4	?	37
DNF	SP2	149		(Germany) Martin Kinzler (Germany) Klaus Ebbing (Netherlands) Ernst Berg (Germany) Klaus Werner	Ford Fiesta ST	**H**	35
DNF	SP2	149		(Germany) Martin Kinzler (Germany) Klaus Ebbing (Netherlands) Ernst Berg (Germany) Klaus Werner	?	**H**	35
DNF	SP7	30	(Belgium) Mühlner Motorsport SPRL	(Germany) Heinz-Josef Bermes (Germany) Jochen Krumbach (Germany) Michael Schrey (Germany) Tim Bergmeister	Porsche 997 GT3 Cup	?	34
DNF	SP7	30	(Belgium) Mühlner Motorsport SPRL	(Germany) Heinz-Josef Bermes (Germany) Jochen Krumbach (Germany) Michael Schrey (Germany) Tim Bergmeister	Porsche 3.6L Flat 6	?	34
DNF	SP3T	105	(Germany) MS Racing	(Germany) Manfred Siek (Germany) Harald Böttner (Liechtenstein) Johann Wanger (Germany) Robert Lommel	SEAT León Supercopa	**Y**	34
DNF	SP3T	105	(Germany) MS Racing	(Germany) Manfred Siek (Germany) Harald Böttner (Liechtenstein) Johann Wanger (Germany) Robert Lommel	?	**Y**	34
DNF	SP3T	103		(United Kingdom) Giles Groombridge (United Kingdom) Dave Ashford (United States) James Baxter (United Kingdom) Matthew West	Mazda RX-7	?	29
DNF	SP3T	103		(United Kingdom) Giles Groombridge (United Kingdom) Dave Ashford (United States) James Baxter (United Kingdom) Matthew West	Mazda 1.3L Rotary	?	29
DNF	SP4-5	96		(Germany) Heinz Schmersal (Germany) Reinhard Belter (Germany) Jörg Hübner (Germany) Mike Stursberg	Honda S2000	?	27
DNF	SP4-5	96		(Germany) Heinz Schmersal (Germany) Reinhard Belter (Germany) Jörg Hübner (Germany) Mike Stursberg	Honda 2.2L I4	?	27
DNF	SP4-5	79		(United Kingdom) Guy Povey (United Kingdom) Dave Cox (United Kingdom) John Irvine (United Kingdom) Hamish Irvine	BMW M3 E25	?	26
DNF	SP4-5	79		(United Kingdom) Guy Povey (United Kingdom) Dave Cox (United Kingdom) John Irvine (United Kingdom) Hamish Irvine	BMW 3.0L I6	?	26
DNF	S1	268		(Germany) Heiko Hahn (Germany) Tom Robson (Germany) Kristian Vetter (Germany) Gregor Vogler	BMW 120d	?	25
DNF	S1	268		(Germany) Heiko Hahn (Germany) Tom Robson (Germany) Kristian Vetter (Germany) Gregor Vogler	BMW 2.0L I4 Diesel	?	25
DNF	SP6	22		(Germany) Michael Tischner (Germany) Ulrich Becker (Germany) Klaus Engelbrecht-Schnür (Germany) Klaus Völker	BMW M3 E46	**D**	24
DNF	SP6	22		(Germany) Michael Tischner (Germany) Ulrich Becker (Germany) Klaus Engelbrecht-Schnür (Germany) Klaus Völker	BMW 3.2L I6	**D**	24
DNF	V5	216	(Germany) Black Falcon/Performance Center Nürburg	(Germany) Heiko Heinemann (United Kingdom) Ralf Willems (Germany) Martin Elzer	BMW 392 C	**Y**	24
DNF	V5	216	(Germany) Black Falcon/Performance Center Nürburg	(Germany) Heiko Heinemann (United Kingdom) Ralf Willems (Germany) Martin Elzer	?	**Y**	24
DNF	V3-V4	186		(Germany) Michael Auert (Germany) Heinrich Schneebeli (Germany) Jürgen Glath (Germany) Bojan Ferk	Opel Astra OPC	**D**	22
DNF	V3-V4	186		(Germany) Michael Auert (Germany) Heinrich Schneebeli (Germany) Jürgen Glath (Germany) Bojan Ferk	Opel 2.0L I4	**D**	22
DNF	SP8	5	(Germany) Zakspeed Racing GmbH & Co. KG	(Germany) Hans-Peter Huppert-Nieder (Luxembourg) Antoine Feidt (Germany) Werner Mohr (Germany) Michael Klein	Dodge Viper GTS-R	**M**	22
DNF	SP8	5	(Germany) Zakspeed Racing GmbH & Co. KG	(Germany) Hans-Peter Huppert-Nieder (Luxembourg) Antoine Feidt (Germany) Werner Mohr (Germany) Michael Klein	Viper 8.0L V10	**M**	22
DNF	V3-V4	199		(Austria) Stefan Hardtke (Austria) Roland Hardtke (Netherlands) Gerd Flentje	BMW 325i	?	18
DNF	V3-V4	199		(Austria) Stefan Hardtke (Austria) Roland Hardtke (Netherlands) Gerd Flentje	BMW 2.5L I6	?	18
DNF	S1	264		(United Kingdom) Dean Ronald Clements (United Kingdom) Malcolm Edeson (United Kingdom) David Smith (United Kingdom) Nick Reynolds	Alfa Romeo 147	**D**	18
DNF	S1	264		(United Kingdom) Dean Ronald Clements (United Kingdom) Malcolm Edeson (United Kingdom) David Smith (United Kingdom) Nick Reynolds	Alfa Romeo 1.9L I4 Diesel	**D**	18
DNF	SP1	163		(Switzerland) Walter Kaufmann (Switzerland) Gregor Nick (Sweden) Hans Söderholm	Mini Cooper	?	15
DNF	SP1	163		(Switzerland) Walter Kaufmann (Switzerland) Gregor Nick (Sweden) Hans Söderholm	Rover 1.6L I4	?	15
DNF	SP4-5	71	(Italy) Luigi Taverna Racing & Classic	(Italy) Valerio Leone (Italy) Giorgio Piodi (Italy) Giuliano Bottazzi (Italy) Grouzoni Bottazzi	BMW M3 E46	?	13
DNF	SP4-5	71	(Italy) Luigi Taverna Racing & Classic	(Italy) Valerio Leone (Italy) Giorgio Piodi (Italy) Giuliano Bottazzi (Italy) Grouzoni Bottazzi	BMW 3.2L I6	?	13
DNF	SP3	134		(Germany) Stefan Schmelter (Germany) Andreas Telker (Germany) Peter Wichmann	Opel Astra Caravan	?	10
DNF	SP3	134		(Germany) Stefan Schmelter (Germany) Andreas Telker (Germany) Peter Wichmann	?	?	10
DNF	N1-N2	219		(France) "Segolen" (France) Gérard Tremblay (France) Thierry Guitton (France) Daniel Oger	Honda Integra Type-R	?	7
DNF	N1-N2	219		(France) "Segolen" (France) Gérard Tremblay (France) Thierry Guitton (France) Daniel Oger	?	?	7
DNF	V5	212		(Germany) Marco Keller (Denmark) Kurt Thiel (Germany) Demian Schaffert (Germany) Siegfried Sträwe	BMW M3 E36	**Y**	6
DNF	V5	212		(Germany) Marco Keller (Denmark) Kurt Thiel (Germany) Demian Schaffert (Germany) Siegfried Sträwe	BMW 3.0L I6	**Y**	6
DNF	SP6	56		(United Kingdom) Martyn Spurrell (United Kingdom) John Coates (United Kingdom) Robin Ward (United Kingdom) Phil Bennett	Subaru Impreza WRC	?	6
DNF	SP6	56		(United Kingdom) Martyn Spurrell (United Kingdom) John Coates (United Kingdom) Robin Ward (United Kingdom) Phil Bennett	Subaru 2.0L Boxer	?	6
DNF	SP7	43	(Austria) Konrad Motorsport GmbH	(Netherlands) Patrick Huisman (Germany) Wolfgang Kaufmann (Germany) Dennis Rostek (Austria) Franz Konrad	Porsche 997 GT3 RSR	**Y**	0
DNF	SP7	43	(Austria) Konrad Motorsport GmbH	(Netherlands) Patrick Huisman (Germany) Wolfgang Kaufmann (Germany) Dennis Rostek (Austria) Franz Konrad	Porsche 3.6L Flat 6	**Y**	0
DNS	SP7	28		(United Kingdom) Bill Cameron (United Kingdom) Barry Horne (United Kingdom) Marino Franchitti	Porsche 996	?	0
DNS	SP7	28		(United Kingdom) Bill Cameron (United Kingdom) Barry Horne (United Kingdom) Marino Franchitti	Porsche 3.6L Flat 6	?	0

== Unknown if raced ==
35. ADAC Zurich 24h Rennen
Pos	Class	No	Team	Drivers	Chassis	Tyre	Laps
Pos	Class	No	Team	Drivers	Engine	Tyre	Laps
DNS	SP3	122		(Germany) Matthias Holle (Germany) Wolfgang Weber (Germany) Uwe Nittel	Honda S2000	?	?
DNS	SP3	122		(Germany) Matthias Holle (Germany) Wolfgang Weber (Germany) Uwe Nittel	Honda 2.2L I4	?	?
DNS	SP6	67	(Germany) Kruse Motorsport	(United Kingdom) Ian Mitchell (Germany) Hardy Schiller (Germany) Arno Klasen (Austria) Michael Prym	BMW Z4 GTR	K	?
DNS	SP6	67	(Germany) Kruse Motorsport	(United Kingdom) Ian Mitchell (Germany) Hardy Schiller (Germany) Arno Klasen (Austria) Michael Prym	?	K	?
DNS	V3-V4	204	(Germany) Dürener Motorsport Club e.V. i. ADAC	(United Kingdom) Brian Lambert (United Kingdom) Richard Bull (United Kingdom) Joe Ward	BMW 325i E36	Y	?
DNS	V3-V4	204	(Germany) Dürener Motorsport Club e.V. i. ADAC	(United Kingdom) Brian Lambert (United Kingdom) Richard Bull (United Kingdom) Joe Ward	BMW 2.5L I6	Y	?
DNS	SP2	150		(Germany) Rüdiger Klos (Germany) André Mühlenbruch (Germany) Holger Wesselmann (Germany) Deniz Istek	Ford Fiesta ST	?	?
DNS	SP2	150		(Germany) Rüdiger Klos (Germany) André Mühlenbruch (Germany) Holger Wesselmann (Germany) Deniz Istek	?	?	?
DNS	S1	255		(Germany) "Fred" (Spain) Pedro Passyutu (Germany) "Wilma" (Belgium) Guy Hoffeld	Alfa Romeo 147	?	?
DNS	S1	255		(Germany) "Fred" (Spain) Pedro Passyutu (Germany) "Wilma" (Belgium) Guy Hoffeld	Alfa Romeo 1.9L I4 Diesel	?	?
DNS	S2	269		(Germany) Michael Marsani (Germany) Stefan Gosch (Germany) Franz Schütte (Germany) Karl Brinker	SEAT Leon	?	?
DNS	S2	269		(Germany) Michael Marsani (Germany) Stefan Gosch (Germany) Franz Schütte (Germany) Karl Brinker	?	?	?
DNS	?	52		(France) Francois Rieviére (Germany) Dirk Baur (Switzerland) Patrick Ancelet	Porsche 968 GPE	?	?
DNS	?	52		(France) Francois Rieviére (Germany) Dirk Baur (Switzerland) Patrick Ancelet	Porsche 3.0L I4	?	?

== Bibliography ==
- Jörg-Richard Ufer & Tim Upietz. 24 Stunden Nürburgring Nordschleife 2007 (in German). Gruppe C Motorsport Verlag. ISBN 978-3-928540-51-3.
