= Booz =

Booz may refer to:

- Booz (surname), a surname (including a list of people with the name)
- Strategy&, formerly known as Booz & Company, a global management consulting firm now part of PricewaterhouseCoopers
- Booz Allen Hamilton, a global management consulting firm and US government contractor
- Edwin G. Booz, American businessman
- Ludovic Booz (born 1940), Haitian artist
- the Greek form of Boaz, a rich landowner mentioned in the Biblical book of Ruth

== See also ==
- Booze (disambiguation)
