= Maïté =

French restaurateur and actress (1938–2024)

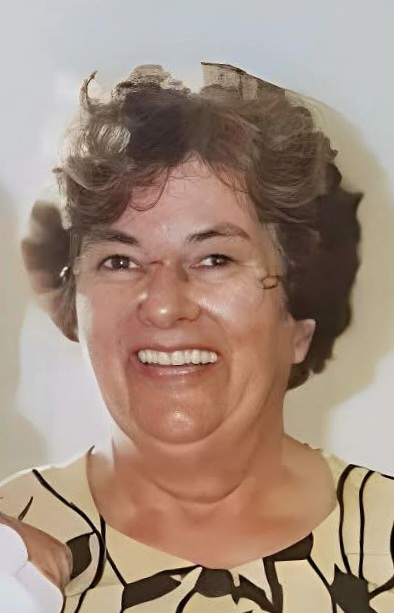
- Born: Marie-Thérèse Badet; 2 June 1938; Rion-des-Landes, France
- Died: 21 December 2024 (aged 86); Rion-des-Landes, France
- Occupations: Television cook; Restaurateur
- Years active: 1983–2008
- Television: La Cuisine des mousquetaires; À table

Marie-Thérèse Ordonez (née Badet; 2 June 1938 – 21 December 2024), known as Maïté, was a French restaurateur, actress and television presenter. She is mostly famous for hosting long-running cookery shows on French television, including La Cuisine des Mousquetaires with Micheline Banzet-Lawton, from 1983 to 1997, and À table, from 1997 to 1999.

== Career ==
At the beginning of her career, Maïté worked as an announcer for the SNCF, France's national railway company: she was in charge of alerting railway workers with a trumpet before a train arrived, so that they could let it pass.

In 1983, Maïté was spotted by director Patrice Bellot during a news report about the Rion-des-Landes rugby team: she was the owner of a nearby restaurant where the players would go after the games. Soon after, she began hosting the cooking show La Cuisine des Mousquetaires with Micheline Banzet-Lawton (1923–2020).

In 1988, Maïté opened her first restaurant in her hometown of Rion-des-Landes, which was later used to record her shows. She eventually closed this first establishment before opening another one in the same town, Chez Maïté, which closed in April 2015.

Maïté's various television appearances gave rise to famous television moments, in particular her very sensual tasting of ortolan in 1984 or a recipe during which a somewhat recalcitrant eel had to be stunned with a mortar pestle in 1992.

In parallel, Maïté was also a host at Sud Radio and appeared regularly in other programs, documentaries and fictions. In particular, she can be seen in two episodes of the program C'est pas sorcier, both entitled Le Cèpe à sorcier and broadcast in 1997 and 2005.

She released a number of books, VHS and DVDs about cooking.

== Personal life and death ==
Maïté was married to Jean-Pierre "Pierrot" Ordonez from 1958 until his death in 2020. Her only son, Serge, died in 2013 from cancer.

Maïté died on 21 December 2024, at the age of 86.

== See also ==
- Two Fat Ladies – Television cooking programme
