= Booz (surname) =

Booz is a surname. Notable people with the surname include:

- Edmund Booz (c. 1824–1870), Philadelphia distiller whose bottles had a distinctive log-cabin shape
- Edwin G. Booz (1887–1951), American businessman
- Ludovic Booz (1940–2015), Haitian artist

== See also ==
- Booze (surname)
