= Rion-des-Landes =

- Commune
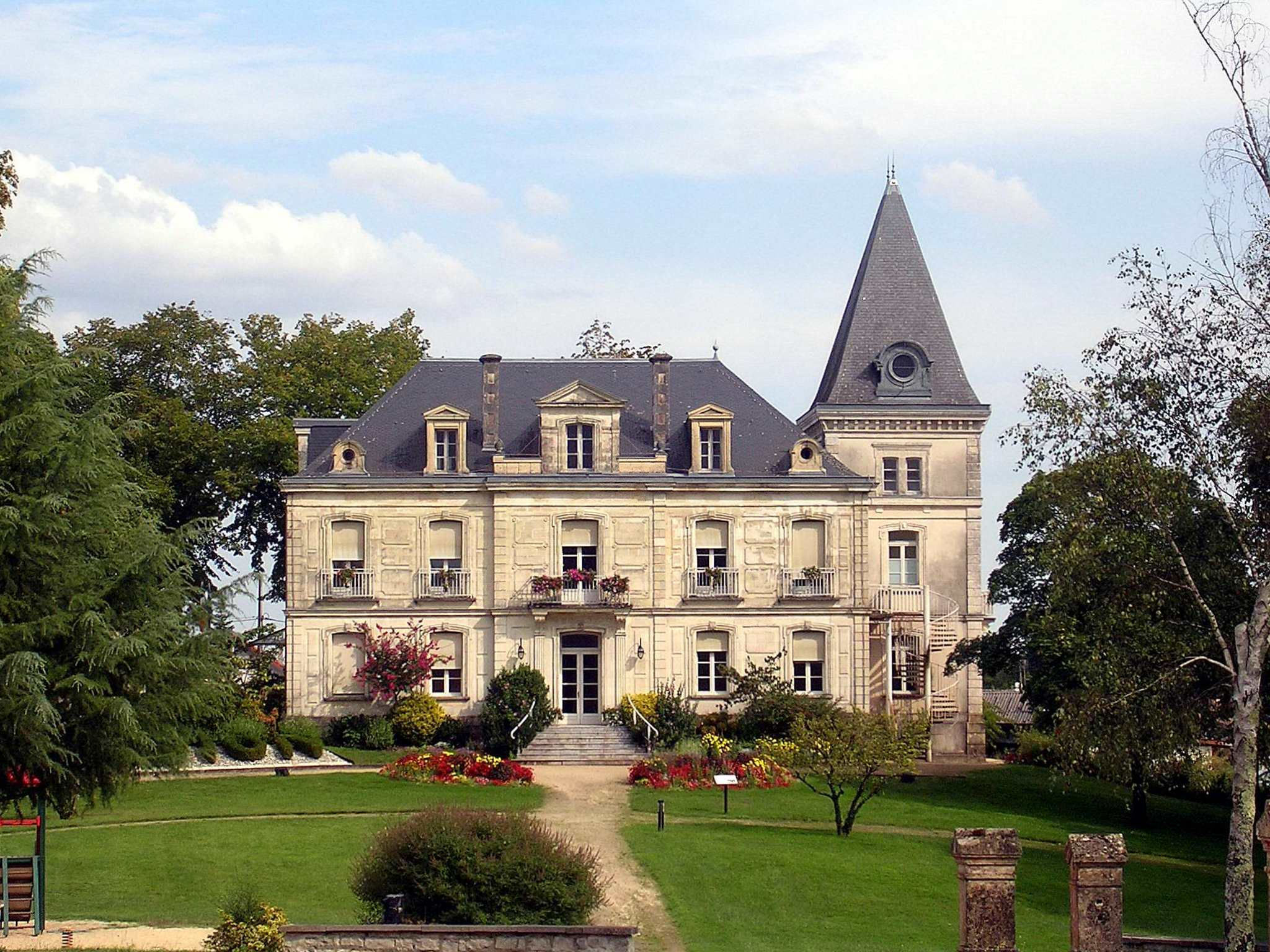
- Château Bellegarde
- Location of Rion-des-Landes
- Location within France Location within Nouvelle-Aquitaine
- Coordinates: 43°55′37″N 0°55′08″W
- Country: France
- Region: Nouvelle-Aquitaine
- Department: Landes
- Arrondissement: Dax
- Canton: Pays morcenais tarusate
- Intercommunality: Pays Tarusate

Government
  - Mayor (2020–2026): Laurent Civel
- Area^{1}: 134.06 km^{2} (51.76 sq mi)
- Elevation: 68 m (223 ft)
- Highest elevation: 103 m (338 ft)
- Lowest elevation: 46 m (151 ft)
- Population (2023): 3,142
  - Density: 23.44/km^{2} (60.70/sq mi)
- Time zone: UTC+01:00 (CET)
  - Summer (DST): UTC+02:00 (CEST)
- INSEE/Postal code: 40243 /40370
- ^{1} French Land Register data, which excludes lakes, ponds, glaciers > 1 km^{2} (0.386 sq mi or 247 acres) and river estuaries.

Rion-des-Landes (French pronunciation: [ʁjɔ̃ de lɑ̃d]; Occitan: Arrion, before 1962: Rion) is a commune in the Landes department in Nouvelle-Aquitaine in southwestern France. On 1 January 2017, the former commune of Boos was merged into Rion-des-Landes.

== Geography ==
Rion-des-Landes is located in the centre of the Landes department.

Château Bellegarde in Rion-des-Landes was built in the first half of the 19th century.

== Population ==
The population data in the table below refer to the commune of Rion-des-Landes proper, in its geography at the given years.

Historical population

Year	Pop.	±% p.a.
1793	1,300	—
1821	1,332	+0.09%
1846	1,716	+1.02%
1872	2,461	+1.40%
1901	2,560	+0.14%
1926	2,527	−0.05%
1946	2,434	−0.19%
1962	2,512	+0.20%
1968	2,479	−0.22%

Year	Pop.	±% p.a.
1975	2,635	+0.88%
1982	2,482	−0.85%
1990	2,329	−0.79%
1999	2,201	−0.63%
2007	2,316	+0.64%
2012	2,501	+1.55%
2017	2,986	+3.61%
2023	3,142	+0.85%

Source: EHESS and INSEE (2007-2023)

== Education ==
- Middle School : Marie-Curie
- Primary school : Jean-Menaux

== Notable residents ==
- Marie-Thérèse Ordonez, also known as Maïté, restaurateur, actress and TV presenter
- Gérard Dages, rugby player, born on 5 March 1930 in Rion-des-Landes. Finalist of the French Rugby Championship in 1953 and 1959 with the Stade Montois.

== See also ==
- Communes of the Landes department
