= Dritok =

Constructed language created in 2007

- /t͜r̥ʼǂʷ/
- Created by: Donald Boozer
- Date: 2007
- Setting and usage: Kryslan
- Ethnicity: Drushek /t͜r̥ʷʼʂq/
- Purpose: Constructed languages: Artistic languages; Fictional languages; Dritok
- Sources: A priori language

Language codes
- ISO 639-3: –
- Glottolog: None

Dritok is a constructed language (conlang) created by Donald Boozer in 2007. Boozer was Secretary (2012–2015) and Librarian (2009–2013) of the Language Creation Society.

Dritok is in the artistic language genre of conlangs, specifically a fictional language. It is spoken by the Drushek, a species residing in the mountains of the fictional continent of Kryslan. The Drushek are large-eared, long-tailed leaping sciurine sapients with no vocal cords, who value solitude and quietness. The Drushek are culturally and linguistically homogeneous, but there are other languages spoken on Kryslan, including Umod and Elasin, by two other sentient species,.

In Dritok, the name of the language is /t͜r̥ʼǃʷ/, with a labialized click at the end. 'Dritok' is its pronunciation in Umod, which renders the click as tɔk.

== Phonology ==
Dritok consists of both oral speech (transcribed in lower case) and sign (transcribed in capitals). The syntax is heavily dependent on sign, but sign is used for some lexical words as well, typically for physical verbs such as 'hold'.

⟨=⟩ indicates that morphemes are sequential, whether they are signed, oral or both.

⟨-⟩ indicates that a sign accompanies an oral word – that is, that two morphemes are simultaneous. For instance, in ⟨Q1-zp.th⟩ 'my foot/leg' and ⟨D2-zp.th⟩ 'your foot/leg', the pronouns (fist touching chest for 'my', flat palm facing interlocutor for 'your') are signed while the oral word ⟨zp.th⟩ is uttered. (For clarity, the sign is sometimes transcribed after the oral component, e.g. when both a prefixed and a simultaneous pronoun occur, as in ⟨Q1=pln.t'-P4&⟩ 'I shelter them'.)

=== Oral phonemes ===
All oral phonemes in Dritok are unvoiced. The language is a gallimaufry of hisses, clicks and fricatives. The loudest phoneme in the language is a porcine snort, transcribed with a "double-dot wide O" (Ꙫ) at Speculative Grammarian. It tends to be found in words with a negative connotation, as the Drushek value stillness in their philosophy of /ʂq.qs.txːm̥͋/ (Shekstan).

Dritok oral phonemes (with Latin transcription and Umod approximations)
	Labial	Dental	Alveolar	Palatal	Retroflex	Velar/uvular	Glottal
Nareal fricative	m̥͋ ⟨n⟩ (n)						
Nasal trill						ʩ ⟨k'⟩ (ŋ)	
Pulmonic plosives	p ⟨p⟩ (p)		t ⟨t⟩ (t)			q ~ k ⟨q⟩ (k)	
Fricatives	ɸ ~ f ⟨f⟩ (f)		s ⟨s⟩ (s)	ç ⟨z⟩ (ʒ)	ʂ ⟨c⟩ (ʃ)		
Lateral fricatives			ɬ ⟨l⟩ (θ)				
Semivowels	ʷ ⟨w⟩		t͜r̥ ⟨r⟩ (tr)			χ ~ x ⟨x⟩ (x ~ ə) χʷ ~ xʷ ⟨xw⟩ (x ~ u)	h ~ x ⟨h⟩ (h ~ ə) hʷ ~ xʷ ⟨hw⟩ (h ~ ɔ)
Ejective plosives	pʼ ⟨p'⟩ (b)		tʼ ⟨t'⟩ (d)			qʼ ~ kʼ ⟨q'⟩ (ɡ)	
Ejective affricates			t͜sʼ ⟨s'⟩ (t͜ʃ)	c͜çʼ ⟨z'⟩ (d͜ʒ)			
Buccal trill			ↀt͜r̥ ⟨r'⟩ (dr)				
Click consonants	ʘ ⟨p*⟩ (pɔk)	ǃ̪ ⟨t*⟩ (sɪk) ǃ̪ʷ ⟨t*w⟩ (sɔk)	ǃ ~ ǂ ⟨z*⟩ (tɪk) ǃʷ ~ ǂʷ ⟨z*w⟩ (tɔk)			ʞ ⟨k*⟩ (ŋɔk)	
Velopharyngeal						ʩʷ↓ (Ꙫ) ⟨o⟩ (no)	

Most consonants may be labialized. Only a few are shown on the chart, because their Umod correlates are irregular. The consonants that cannot be labialized are the labials and the nasals (⟨n, k', k*⟩). Some consonants may be pronounced with substantial lengthening.

⟨r⟩ is allophonically [p͜r̥ ~ t͜r̥ ~ q͜r̥], with [t͜r̥] as the default realization.

⟨r'⟩ is produced with the air contained in the mouth rather than with the lungs.

The glottals have also been described as pharyngeal. The dental click is a sharp [ǃ̪] rather than the affricated [ǀ] of tsk! tsk! in English. The velar click is described as being pronounced with the lips closed.

There are no vowels. However, when Dritok words are adopted into Umod, vowels are inserted to break up the consonants. [ɛ] is the default vowel, An ejective is followed by [i] or [u], depending on whether it's labialized. "Semivowels" are [x] or [h] when interpreted as Umod consonants, and as [ə] or labialized [u, ɔ] when interpreted as vowels.

In transcription, a period may be used to clarify syllable boundaries.

=== Manual phonemes (cheremes) ===
There is also an element of sign to the Dritok language with various syntactic functions conveyed through the use of sign. Signs may be one- or two-handed. At night, the sign component is conveyed by touch. They same may occur with intimate conversation by day.

Dritok handshapes (and orientation)

⟨B1⟩
(Stokoe 'Å')

⟨C2⟩
(Stokoe 'C')

⟨D2⟩
(Stokoe 'B')

⟨I2⟩
(Stokoe 'G')

⟨L2⟩
(Stokoe 'L')

⟨P2⟩
(Stokoe 'I')

⟨Q2⟩
(Stokoe 'S')

⟨U2⟩
(Stokoe '8')

⟨V2⟩
(Stokoe 'V')

⟨W2⟩
(Stokoe '5')

⟨Y2⟩
(Stokoe 'Y')

The Drushek have three fingers and a thumb, so the ring-finger may be ignored in these images.

The hand is held in one of five basic orientations: ⟨1⟩ palm in (typically against the chest), ⟨2⟩ out (facing the speaker), ⟨3⟩ up, ⟨4⟩ down or ⟨5⟩ to the side. For any of these, the fingers may ⟨@⟩ be inverted (point in the opposite of their usual direction for the basic orientation).

There are also motion elements:

⟨&⟩ circling the hand (the circling motion is in the plane of the hand)
⟨>⟩ motion to the flank (to the side away from the centerline)
⟨<⟩ motion across the body (to or past the centerline)
⟨!⟩ downward motion (usually eye level to neutral space)
⟨?⟩ upward motion (usually neutral space to eye level)
⟨^⟩ change from one handshape to another. E.g. ⟨D3^Q3⟩ means a flat hand, palm up, closes to a fist.

For two-handed gestures, the two hands may have various relative positions:

⟨A/B⟩ A over B
⟨A+B⟩ A and B side by side
⟨A#B⟩ A and B are facing each other side by side

Thus I1@!/D3 is a downward-pointing index finger brought down to (and generally touching) a palm-up flat hand. Q4+Q4 would be two fists, palm down with the knuckles facing the interlocutor; in Q1#Q1, the palms are toward the speaker and the knuckles of each hand are touching.

== Grammar ==
Oral nouns and verbs do not inflect for number or tense. Word order is Subject-Verb-Object, though one signed pronoun may be simultaneous with the verb.

== Script ==
Dritok script

The Dritok script is inspired by Tibetan. It does not have Unicode support.

== Sample ==
Lines 1 to 6 1/2

Lines 6 to 12
The North Wind and the Sun, in Dritok

The North Wind and the Sun in Dritok, along with a fairly literal translation, and using a version of the Latin transcription a few years older than that described in the previous section (for example, it joins signs to oral words with ⟨>>⟩ and ⟨((⟩, one of them perhaps in place of hyphens):

1. V2&=sx:w.q't. s'.s' pr.np'. D5^Q5=V2&=zn.t'.z* P4&^D1>>tf.p*.o.

Those two, the Great Wind and the Sun, with respect to their strength were arguing.

2. P4=sx:w.q't. P4=D1>>s’.t*.ql. Q1=zn.t'.z*. D4/Q5=D2

The Great Wind he said: "My strength is superior to yours."

3. P4=pr.np' P4=D1>>s'.t*ql. Q1=zn.t'z*. D4/Q5=D2

The Sun he said: "My strength is superior to yours."

4. P4=tr'w.cq. V2&=D1>>xws.ql. P4=hr:.zp.th. I2>>lt'.q'.

A Drushek, the two of them saw, (he was) leaping along the path.

5. P4=sx:w.q't. P4=D1>>s'.t*.ql. P4=pln.t'. tr'w.cq. P4=D5((f.t'.q'.

The Great Wind he said: His cloak, the Drushek he will remove.

6. Q1=P4=D5((zp.p'tl. f.t'q'. Q1=D1((t'.qsx:n. D5^Q5= zn.t'.z*.

I him will compel the removing. I will be the winner with respect to strength.

7. sx:w.q't. P4=x:wn.hr:. P4=D1>>z*.z*.n. P4= D1>>x:wn.hr:. Q5/Q5

The Great Wind, his exhaling it began. He blew harder and harder.

8. tr'w.cq. P4=D1>>t'n.qxn.=P4 Q5/Q5 D5^Q5=P4=pln.t'.

The Drushek, he wrapped himself tighter and tighter in his cloak.

9. sx:w.q't. P4= D1>>px:w.zn P4=x:wn.hr:. P4= D1>>x:t.t'

The Great Wind, he was tired. His blowing he stopped.

10. pr.np' P4=pr.qt.px. P4= D1>>z*.z*.n. P4=pr.qt.px. Q5/Q5

The Sun, its "shining" it began. He shone brighter and brighter.

11. tr'w.cq P4=pln.t'. P4=D1>>f.t'q'.

The Drushek his cloak he removed.

12. sx:w.q't. P4=D1>>s'.t*.ql. D2=pr.np'. D2=zn.t'.z*. D4/Q5=Q1.

The Great Wind said, "Sun, your strength is superior to mine."

== Real-world history ==
Boozer first entered the world of conlanging as a child, when he read Dr. Seuss' On Beyond Zebra and traced the Seussian alphabetical extensions in this author's constructed script (conscript). He became enamored of creating languages after reading J. R. R. Tolkien's "The Lord of the Rings" trilogy, and being introduced to such languages as Quenya and Sindarin.

In high school, Boozer created his own conscripts. While in high school, he created the constructed world (conworld) of Kryslan for an illustrated book as part of an art class project.

This conworld went on the backburner when Boozer focused on starting a family. Then, a few years before the date of the Elvish, Esperanto and Beyond exhibit at Cleveland Public Library, Boozer took it up again.

Boozer came up with this sciurine language by speculating what sapients without vocal cords would sound like, and decided they would sound like chipmunks then explored whether one could make a language composed entirely of unvoiced sounds.

== Reception ==
When Boozer presented this language at the 2nd Language Creation Conference, he was regaled by such questions from the audience as: "How do [the Drushek] yell?", "Do they make art?", "Can they use whistling?", "Can they throw objects to get someone's attention?" and "Do they have thick skin?"

Arika Okrent described the audience's reaction to Dritok as the samples sending "waves of glee through the audience – they sounded so strange, so inhuman, but there was a detectable structure or system that gave Dritok a sense of 'languageness'."
