= Boos, Landes =

Boos
- Part of Rion-des-Landes
- Location of Boos
- Location within France Location within Nouvelle-Aquitaine
- Coordinates: 43°53′32″N 0°59′34″W
- Country: France
- Region: Nouvelle-Aquitaine
- Department: Landes
- Arrondissement: Dax
- Canton: Pays morcenais tarusate
- Commune: Rion-des-Landes
- Area^{1}: 15.81 km^{2} (6.10 sq mi)
- Elevation: 78 m (256 ft)
- Highest elevation: 88 m (289 ft)
- Lowest elevation: 60 m (200 ft)
- Population (2023): 543
  - Density: 34.3/km^{2} (89.0/sq mi)
- Time zone: UTC+01:00 (CET)
  - Summer (DST): UTC+02:00 (CEST)
- Postal code: 40370
- ^{1} French Land Register data, which excludes lakes, ponds, glaciers > 1 km^{2} (0.386 sq mi or 247 acres) and river estuaries.

Boos (French pronunciation: [bos]; Gascon: Bòsc) is a former commune in the Landes department in Nouvelle-Aquitaine in southwestern France. On 1 January 2017, it was merged into the commune Rion-des-Landes.

== See also ==
- Communes of the Landes department
