= Boozer =

Boozer may refer to:

- Boozer, a person who drinks alcohol, especially one who drinks to excess
- Pub, in British slang
- Boozer (surname), a surname
- Boozer Pitts (1893–1971), American college football player and coach
- Boozer, in the List of World War II electronic warfare equipment
