= Edmund Booz =

American importer and liquor merchant (1824–1870)

- Born: 1824; Bucks County, Pennsylvania
- Died: 1870 (aged 45–46)
- Occupation: Businessman

Edmund G. Booz (1824–1870) was an American importer and liquor merchant,whose name has been frequently associated with the origin or popularity of the word booze. The log cabin-shaped decanter associated with his liquor store in Philadelphia became a highly sought-after collector's item, and his name was revived in a 1950s Kentucky bourbon brand.

== Early life ==
Edmund Booz was born in 1824 in Bucks County, Pennsylvania. His parents were William and Alice Green Hewson Booz, both of them born in Bucks County. His father, William, was a small landowner and farmer.

== Importer and merchant ==
The first mention of Edmund in Philadelphia is as a clerk and merchant at 87 South Front Street near Penn's Landing in 1855. In 1860, he moved his business around the block to 120 Walnut Street and became an importer and liquor dealer. His landlord was Portuguese Madeira wine importer Fortunato Joaquim Figueira, Baron of Conceição.

Booz' business grew in sales and reputation and in 1864, he doubled the size of his facility by expanding into the space behind his at 15 Granite Street.

There has long been an assumption that Booz distilled his own whiskey, but there is no evidence to support this. Jesse Godley, his original landlord on South Front Street is a likely source, as he owned Federally bonded warehouses on Front Street.

After his death in 1870, his store's contents were auctioned off: 500 packages of domestic and imported liquors, horses, carriages, harness, fixtures, stocks, and personal property, but there was no mention of distilling equipment.

== Log Cabin decanter ==
Much of the mystery and speculation around Edmund G. Booz comes from a log cabin-shaped decanter that originated out of a partnership between Booz and his neighbor Whitney Glassworks at 118 Walnut Street.

During the 1850s, glass was expensive and whiskey was rarely sold in bottles. Instead, customers would bring their own jugs from home or could buy refillable jugs. Booz went one step further, offering a uniquely styled log cabin-shaped bottle displaying the name of his business and location on Walnut Street.

The log cabin shape was inspired by William Henry Harrison, whose 1840 campaign for President of the United States positioned him as the "Log Cabin" candidate versus his competitor Martin Van Buren, who was seen as more aristocratic. This decanter helped fuel the idea that E. G. Booz was a distiller and that he provided this whiskey during Harrison's campaign, but Booz would have been only 16 years old at the time and there is no evidence to support it. The 1840 date embossed in the glass was a reference to the Harrison campaign, not the origin of the whiskey.

== Family ==
Booz married Catherine Johnson around 1850. The couple’s first child, Alice, was born in 1851 and died at the age of 6. Their oldest son, Charles, was born in 1857. Johnson gave birth to twins Randall and Katie the following year, with the latter dying in 1860.

== Death ==
On July 19, 1870, a dehydrated Edmund Booz collapsed in his home, suffering from the effects of heat stroke. He died later that evening with the cause of death stated as congestion of the brain. He was buried in Laurel Hill Cemetery, Philadelphia. His son Charles was buried next to him in 1883.

== Kentucky Straight Bourbon Whiskey ==
The 1950s were an era when bourbon sales were declining, distilleries such as Jim Beam began releasing their bourbons in collectable decanters. To take advantage of this, a distillery in a Bardstown, Kentucky established the E. G. Booz Distilling Company and released a log cabin decanter that took inspiration from the original Whitney Glassworks design.

They advertised E. G. Booz as "a name so famous, it has become part of the English Language," and claimed that 114 years before (using the 1840 date) E. G. Booz "owned a small distillery where hand-made whiskey of rare excellence was produced." The spirit inside was a Kentucky Straight Bourbon Whiskey, rather than what was likely a Pennsylvania spirit in the original Booz decanters from the 1860s.
