= Booser Doppelmaar =

Geological formation in western Germany

Coordinates: 50°18′45″N 6°59′52″E

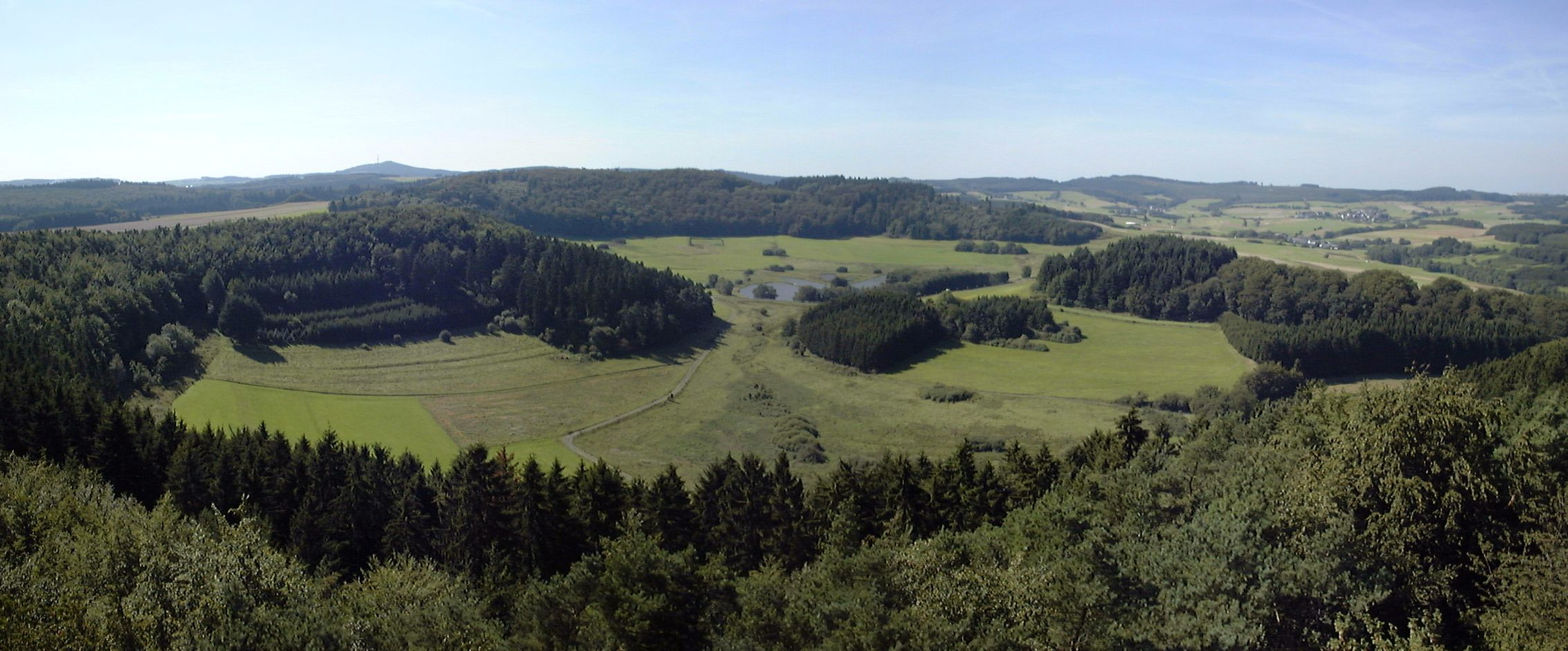
The double maar seen from the Eifel Tower, Boos to the east (2004)

The Booser Doppelmaar ("Double Maar of Boos") comprises two maars that have silted up and, today, form shallow depressions in the countryside. They lie on the territory of the village of Boos (in the collective municipality of Vordereifel), a few hundred metres west of the village itself. The two maars were formed 10,150 to 14,160 years ago and belong to the Quaternary volcano field of the Volcanic Eifel. (Note: Volcanic Eifel in the sense of a natural historical space or a region, not in the sense of a natural regional unit.) From a natural region perspective it lies in the south of the Hohe Acht Upland (which belongs to the natural regional major unit of the Eastern High Eifel), ca. 7.8 km south (more precisely half west-by-south or 185.625º) of the summit of the Hohe Acht.

== The maars ==
The two maars form large, circular basins surrounded by tuff embankments that lie on a line running west-southwest to east-northeast and thus follow the Variscan strike of the terrain. The west-southwestern maar has a diameter of about 700 metres and is between 30 and 60 metres deep; its north-northeastern counterpart is between 650 and 700 metres across and from 50 to 87 metres deep. The two hollows are very wet, so that there are still places that are permanently under water. These wet areas were formerly used as fish ponds, but later silted up and became meadows and arable fields. Today there is a fish pond again in the west-southwestern maar known as the Booser Weiher. In the vicinity of the maars are tuff pits in which the volcanic tuff, formed during the eruption of the maars, was mined.

== Formation and rocks ==
Volcanism in the Eifel began about 600,000 years ago and led to the formation of numerous volcanic landforms. What was probably the last eruption, which led to the formation of the Ulmener Maar, was about 11,000 years ago. Within those timeframes the Boos maars belong to the youngest formations in the Volcanic Eifel. C^{14} dating of rocks from the maars as well as of organic material have suggested an age of 14,160 years for the eastern maar. The tuffs, which have been dated to 10,150 years ago, cannot be positively associated with the formation of the two maars.

The tuffs contain basalt bombs with host rock and large olivine crystals. The tuffs consist partly only of magmatic crystals (crystal tuffs) and contain broken pieces of wehrlite and syenite. Seams of lava have intruded into the tuffs. In the immediate vicinity of the Booser Doppelmaar there is a total of eight cinder cones, that were formed more or less simultaneously about 35,000 years ago. A lava stream flowed from one of these volcanic cones westwards reaching the valley of the Nitz.

== Nature reserve and Volcano Park station ==
The two maars lie within the "Booser Maar" Nature Reserve, which with 152 or 157.7136 ha one of the largest nature reserves in Rhineland-Palatinate. In the reserve, on the hill of the Schneeberg (on the embankment on the eastern side of the east-northeastern maar) is the Eifel Tower.

The reserve is also a station in the Volcano Park (in Mayen-Koblenz), VULKANPARK with its head office in Koblenz.

== Literature ==
- Wilhelm Meyer: Geologie der Eifel. Schweizerbart'sche Verlagsbuchhandlung, Stuttgart, 1986, ISBN 3-510-65127-8.
