= Booze (surname) =

Booze is a surname. Notable people with the surname include:

- Bea Booze (1920–1986), American jazz singer
- Mary Booze (1877–1948), African-American politician
- Tyrone Booze (1959–2022), American boxer
- William Samuel Booze (1862–1933), late 19th-century American politician

== See also ==
- Booz (surname)
