= Boos (surname) =

Boos is a surname. Notable people with the surname include:

- Benjamin Boos (born 2003), German cyclist
- Carl Boos (1806–1883), German architect
- Charles de Boos (1819–1900), Australian writer
- Emma Boos-Jegher (1857–1932), Swiss feminist
- Georgi Boos (born 1963), former governor of Kaliningrad Oblast of Russia
- Martin Boos (1762–1825), evangelical Roman Catholic theologian
- Tino Boos (born 1975), German ice hockey player
