= Boozeville, Georgia =

Unincorporated community in Georgia, US

Coordinates: 34°10′17″N 85°10′31″W

Former church (as indicated by USGS map)

Boozeville is an unincorporated community in Floyd County, in the U.S. state of Georgia.

== History ==
The community's name honors the Booze family of early settlers.
