= Boos, Mayen-Koblenz =

Boos
- Municipality
- Coat of arms

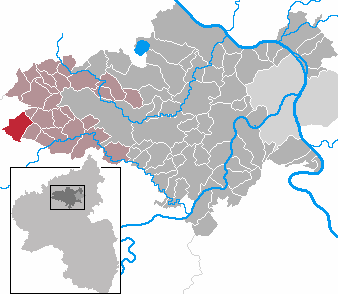
- Location of Boos within Mayen-Koblenz district
- Interactive map of Boos
- Location within Germany Location within Rhineland-Palatinate
- Coordinates: 50°18′47″N 7°1′10″E
- Country: Germany
- State: Rhineland-Palatinate
- District: Mayen-Koblenz
- Municipal assoc.: Vordereifel

Government
  - Mayor (2019–24): Ulrich Faßbender

Area
  - Total: 10.38 km^{2} (4.01 sq mi)
- Elevation: 470 m (1,540 ft)

Population (2025-12-31)
  - Total: 611
  - Density: 58.9/km^{2} (152/sq mi)
- Time zone: UTC+01:00 (CET)
  - Summer (DST): UTC+02:00 (CEST)
- Postal codes: 56729
- Dialling codes: 02656
- Vehicle registration: MYK
- Website: www.boos-eifel.de

Boos (German pronunciation: [boːs]) is a municipality in the county of Mayen-Koblenz in Rhineland-Palatinate, western Germany.

== Geography ==
The parish lies in the East Eifel, a mountain region characterised by volcanic maars and covers an area of 10.38 km², of which 5.02 km² are forest. In 2000, a nature reserve was established, the Booser Maar, with an area of 1.52 km².

Boos is the westernmost municipality of the county of Mayen-Koblenz and lies in the Volcanic Eifel, around five kilometres southeast of the Nürburgring racetrack. Northwest of the village is the Eifel Tower, erected in 2003, on the 557-metre-high hill of Schneeberg with views over the local area including the Booser Doppelmaar, a double maar.
