= Deaths in October 1987 =

The following is a list of notable deaths in October 1987.

Entries for each day are listed alphabetically by surname. A typical entry lists information in the following sequence:

- Name, age, country of citizenship at birth, subsequent country of citizenship (if applicable), reason for notability, cause of death (if known), and reference.

== October 1987 ==
=== 1 ===
- Richard Blackburn, 69, Australian judge and legal academic, cancer.
- Douglas Cleverdon, 84, English radio producer and bookseller.
- June Clyde, 77, American actress, singer and dancer (A Strange Adventure, A Study in Scarlet).
- Valeriya Golubtsova, 86, Soviet scientist, director of the Moscow Power Engineering Institute.
- Eusebio Guiñez, 80, Argentine Olympic long-distance runner (1948).
- Luis da Costa Ivens Ferraz, 90, Portuguese Olympic equestrian (1928).
- Geoffrey Jackson, 72, British diplomat and writer, ambassador to Uruguay, kidnapped by guerrillas.
- Zina Morhange, 78, Polish-born French physician, member of the French Resistance.
- Abdur Rahim, 69, Bangladeshi Islamic scholar and politician.

=== 2 ===
- Madeleine Carroll, 81, English actress (The 39 Steps), pancreatic cancer.
- Jack Lyons, 86, Scottish-American Olympic soccer player (1928).
- John Mastrangelo, 61, American NFL player.
- Sir Peter Medawar, 72, Brazilian-born British biologist, Nobel laureate in Physiology or Medicine.
- Russell Rouse, 73, American screenwriter, director and producer (The Well, Pillow Talk), heart failure.
- Hryhoriy Vasiura, 72, Soviet officer in the Red Army and in the German Schutzmannschaft, executed.

=== 3 ===
- Jean Anouilh, 77, French dramatist and screenwriter (Antigone), heart attack.
- Catherine Bramwell-Booth, 104, English Salvation Army officer, granddaughter of Salvation Army founder.
- Hans Gál, 97, Austrian and Scottish composer.
- Mahamat Idriss, 45, French-born Chadian Olympic high jumper (1960, 1964, 1968).
- Maria Ivogün, 95, Hungarian soprano singer.
- Kalervo Palsa, 40, Finnish artist, pneumonia.
- Walter Bernard Smith, 75, Canadian politician, member of the Canada House of Commons (1968–1979).

=== 4 ===
- Neville Cohen, 74, English cricketer.
- Mercer Cook, 84, American diplomat and professor, U.S. Ambassador to the Gambia, Senegal and Niger, pneumonia.
- Eric Gandar Dower, 92–93, Scottish politician and businessman, Member of Parliament.
- Bjarne Elgar Grottum, 94, American politician, member of the Minnesota Senate (1947–1954).
- Mian Arshad Hussain, 77, Pakistani politician and diplomat, Foreign Minister and Ambassador to Sweden.
- Raymond W. Karst, 84, American politician, member of the United States House of Representatives (1949–1951).
- Chester Nelsen Sr., 85, American Olympic cyclist (1928).
- Eloise Wilkin, 83, American illustrator of Little Golden Books, cancer.
- Hubert Yencesse, 87, French sculptor.

=== 5 ===
- Vladimir Akimov, 34, Soviet Russian Olympic water polo player (1980).
- Charles Baillie, 85, British Olympic swimmer (1924).
- Conrad Bourcier, 71, Canadian ice hockey player (Montreal Canadiens).
- Maurice de Conninck, 90, French Olympic middle-distance runner (1920).
- Manny Cussins, British businessman, chairman of Waring & Gillow and Leeds United F.C.
- Isobel Roe, 71, British Olympic alpine skier (1948).

=== 6 ===
- Hi Brigham, 95, American football player.
- Grete Heckscher, 85, Danish Olympic fencer (1924).
- Roald Jensen, 44, Norwegian international footballer (Brann, Heart of Midlothian, Norway), heart failure.
- Eugen Steimle, 77, Nazi German SS commander, death sentence commuted.

=== 7 ===
- Ivan Belošević, 78, Croatian footballer.
- Charles J. Carney, 74, American politician, member of U.S. House of Representatives (1970–1979), heart ailment.
- Abdul Haleem Chowdhury, 59, Bangladeshi politician.
- Phil Flanagan, 77, American AFL footballer (Boston Shamrocks).
- John Fletcher, 46, English tubist and French horn player, cerebral haemorrhage.
- Greta Granstedt, 80, American film and television actress.
- Verrall Newman, 90, British Olympic diver (1924).
- Cedric Phatudi, 75, South African politician, Chief Minister of Lebowa.
- Stefan Szelestowski, 86, Polish Olympic athlete (1924, 1928).
- Sarkes Tarzian, 87, Ottoman-born American engineer, inventor and broadcaster.
- Bobby Walston, 58, American NFL footballer (Philadelphia Eagles), heart attack.
- Valentin Zamotaykin, 47, Soviet Olympic sailor (1964, 1972, 1976).

=== 8 ===
- Spencer Gordon Bennet, 94, American film producer and director.
- Alberto Segismundo Cruz, 87, Filipino poet, short story writer and novelist.
- Richard W. Dempsey, 78, American illustrator and painter.
- Mona Douglas, 89, British Manx poet, novelist and journalist.
- Rolf Dudley-Williams, 79, British aeronautical engineer and politician, Member of Parliament.
- Warren C. Gill, 74, American coast guard commander and politician.
- Roger Lancelyn Green, 68, British biographer and children's writer (King Arthur and His Knights of the Round Table).
- Nader Mahdavi, 24, Persian Revolutionary Guard Corps naval commander.
- Cecil Matthews, 73, New Zealand Olympic long-distance runner (1936).
- Donald McWhinnie, 66, British BBC executive and director.
- Arnaldo Santana, 37, American actor.
- Konstantinos Tsatsos, 88, Greek diplomat and politician, President of Greece.
- Dick Wittmann, 86, Australian rules footballer.

=== 9 ===
- Letterio Cucinotta, 85, Italian racing driver.
- Charles R. Donaldson, 68, American attorney and jurist, judge of the Idaho Supreme Court (1969–1987).
- Ella Eronen, 87, Finnish actress.
- Mohammad Farhad, 49, Bangladeshi guerrilla force commander, Bangladesh Communist Party president, heart attack.
- Guru Gopinath, 79, Indian actor and dancer.
- Clare Boothe Luce, 84, American politician, U.S. Ambassador to Italy, member of U.S. House of Representatives, brain cancer.
- William P. Murphy, 95, American physician, Nobel laureate in Physiology or Medicine (pernicious anemia).
- Ted Shiels, 79, Australian rules footballer.
- Henry Studholme, 88, British politician, Member of Parliament.
- Carlos Volante, 81, Argentinian international footballer (Flamengo, Argentina).

=== 10 ===
- Carlos Ancira, 58, Mexican film actor.
- Behice Boran, 77, Turkish Marxist–Leninist politician and author, Member of Parliament, heart disease.
- Jaroslav Bouček, 74, Czech international footballer (Sparta Prague, Czechoslovakia).
- Gretl Braun, 72, German sister of Eva Braun.
- Peter Clyne, 60, Austrian-Australian lawyer and businessman, heart attack.
- Oretha Castle Haley, 48, American civil rights activist, ovarian cancer.
- Malathi, 20, Sri Lankan Tamil Tigers fighter, died in combat.
- Robert Wilberforce, 77, Australian cricketer.

=== 11 ===
- Uwe Barschel, 43, German politician, Minister-President of Schleswig-Holstein, suicide.
- Eske Brun, 83, Danish high civil servant and governor of Greenland.
- Robert d'Arista, 57–58, American artist and educator.
- Ernie Fortney, 72, American basketball player.
- Alfred Kieffer, 83, Luxembourgian Olympic footballer (1924).
- Jaime Pardo Leal, 46, Colombian lawyer, union leader, and politician, assassinated.
- Niall Macpherson, 79, Scottish politician, Minister of Pensions and National Insurance.
- Alan McNicoll, 79, Australian Vice Admiral in the Royal Australian Navy, ambassador to Turkey.
- Koldo Mitxelena, 71–72, Spanish Basque linguist, reconstructed Proto-Basque language.
- Fritz Rössler, 75, German neo-Nazi politician.

=== 12 ===
- Snake Henry, 92, American MLB player (Boston Braves).
- Fahri Korutürk, 84, Turkish admiral, diplomat and politician, president of Turkey.
- Alf Landon, 100, American oil man and politician, Republican candidate in 1936 presidential election.
- Russ Letlow, 74, American NFL footballer (Green Bay Packers).
- Heinz Lowin, 48, German footballer.
- Philleo Nash, 77, American government official and politician, Commissioner of Indian Affairs, renal cancer.
- Gustavo Baz Prada, 93, Mexican politician and doctor, Governor of the State of Mexico.
- Heinz Vollmar, 51, German footballer.

=== 13 ===
- Walter Houser Brattain, 85, American physicist (point-contact transistor), Nobel laureate in Physics, Alzheimer's disease.
- Hugh Alexander Bryson, 75, Canadian politician, member of the House of Commons of Canada (1953–1958).
- Kishore Kumar, 58, Indian actor and playback singer, heart attack.
- Nilgün Marmara, 29, Turkish poet, suicide.
- Lucy Monroe, 80, American operatic soprano and dancer, cancer.
- Walter Fraser Oakeshott, 83, British vice-chancellor of Oxford, discovered Le Morte d'Arthur Winchester manuscript.
- Anwar Kamal Pasha, 62, Pakistani film director and producer.
- Jamshed Patel, 73, Indian cricket umpire.

=== 14 ===
- Elżbieta Barszczewska, 73, Polish stage and film actress.
- Nikolay Belov, 67, Soviet Olympic wrestler (1952).
- Rodolfo Halffter, 86, Spanish composer.
- Finlay J. MacDonald, 62, Scottish journalist, producer and writer.
- Ted Wildie, 81, Australian rules footballer.
- Basil Wright, 80, English documentary filmmaker (The Song of Ceylon).

=== 15 ===
- Lennie Aleshire, 97, American vaudeville and country music performer.
- Arthur Benson, 79, British colonial administrator, Governor of Northern Rhodesia.
- Thomas Andrew Donnellan, 73, American Roman Catholic prelate, archbishop of Atlanta, stroke.
- August Erne, 82, Swiss racing cyclist.
- Axel Felder, 38, German racing driver.
- Juda Hirsch Quastel, 88, British-Canadian biochemist.
- Gabriele Salviati, 77, Italian Olympic athlete (1932).
- Thomas Sankara, 37, Burkinabe politician, President of Burkina Faso, Prime Minister of Upper Volta, assassinated.
- Donald Wandrei, 79, American science fiction and fantasy writer, and poet.

=== 16 ===
- Frank Eck, 76, American newspaper writer and editor.
- František Hák, 83, Czech Olympic cross-country skier (1924).
- Joseph Höffner, 80, German Roman Catholic cardinal, Archbishop of Cologne, brain tumour.
- Nazir Hussain, 65, Indian actor, director and screenwriter.
- Robin Kreyer, 77, English cricketer and army officer.
- Margo Lee, 64, Australian actor and singer.
- Aleksandr Sery, 59, Soviet film director (Gentlemen of Fortune), suicide.
- Dana Suesse, 75, American musician, composer and lyricist ("You Oughta Be in Pictures"), stroke.
- Tommy Veitch, 38, Scottish footballer.

=== 17 ===
- Pete Cote, 85, American MLB player (New York Giants).
- Ruby Dandridge, 87, American actress (Amos 'n' Andy, Judy Canova Show), heart attack.
- Roderich Menzel, 80, Czech-German amateur tennis player and writer.
- Peter Pund, 80, American college football player.
- Hirsch Schwartzberg, 79, Lithuanian-born American leader of holocaust survivors.
- Abdul Malek Ukil, 63, Bangladeshi politician, Speaker of the Jatiya Sangsad.

=== 18 ===
- Theodore Brameld, 83, American philosopher and educator, pneumonia.
- Pete Carpenter, 73, American jazz trombonist and arranger, lung cancer.
- Adriaan Ditvoorst, 47, Dutch film director and screenwriter (Paranoia).
- Patrick Duffy, 66, Irish Olympic fencer (1948, 1952).
- Prince Emanuel of Liechtenstein, 78, Liechtenstein sovereign family member.
- Sol Goldman, 70, American real estate investor and philanthropist.
- Philip Levine, 87, Belorus-born American immuno-hematologist.
- Michael Lipper, 56, Irish politician, member of the Dáil Éireann (1977–1981).
- Louis Miriani, 90, American politician, mayor of Detroit.
- Joseph Schauers, 78, American Olympic rower (1932).

=== 19 ===
- Jerzy Bandura, 71, Polish sculptor.
- Robert Madden Hill, 59, American circuit and district judge.
- Hermann Lang, 78, German racing driver.
- Carlos Lastarria, 69, Peruvian Olympic sports shooter (1960, 1964).
- Igor Newerly, 84, Polish novelist.
- Marcel Paulus, 67, Luxembourgian Olympic footballer (1948).
- Jacqueline du Pré, 42, British cellist, multiple sclerosis.
- Ben Stahl, 77, American artist, illustrator and author.
- Ernie Toseland, 82, English footballer (Manchester City).

=== 20 ===
- Georges Douking, 85, French stage, film and television actor (The Discreet Charm of the Bourgeoisie).
- Herbert Hallowes, 75, British WWII flying ace.
- Andrey Kolmogorov, 84, Russian mathematician (probability theory).
- Gordon Olive, 71, Australian RAAF officer.
- Mecha Ortiz, 87, Argentinian actress (El canto del cisne).
- Lars-Erik Sjöberg, 43, Swedish international ice hockey player, cancer.

=== 21 ===
- Igor Chernat, 20–21, Soviet serial killer, executed.
- Jerzy Chromik, 56, Polish Olympic long-distance runner (1956, 1960).
- Murray Exelby, 75, Australian rules footballer.
- Pál Gábor, 55, Hungarian film director and screenwriter (Angi Vera).
- Bob Simmons, 64, English actor and stunt man (James Bond series).
- Albertine Van Roy-Moens, 72, Belgian Olympic gymnast (1948).
- Albert Western, 64, Australian rules footballer (South Fremantle).
- He Yingqin, 97, Chinese politician, Premier of the Republic of China.

=== 22 ===
- K. G. Adiyodi, 60, Indian politician, member of the Kerala Legislative Assembly.
- Archduke Anton of Austria, 86, Austrian noble.
- Ragnar Bergstedt, 98, Swedish Olympic rower (1912).
- Reni Erkens, 78, German Olympic swimmer (1928).
- Fernando Jiménez, 82, Puerto Rican Olympic sports shooter (1956).
- Tasman Knight, 80, Australian rules footballer.
- John H. Masters, 74, American general in the U.S. Marine Corps.
- Taylor Scott, 40, English Fleet Air Arm pilot and test pilot for British Aerospace, test flight accident.
- Andrey Starostin, 81, Soviet footballer and author.
- Lino Ventura, 68, Italian-born French actor (Les Misérables), heart attack.

=== 23 ===
- Constantin Alajalov, 86, Armenian-born American painter and illustrator.
- Henri Arnaudeau, 65, French footballer.
- Fred Hughson, 73, Australian rules footballer (Fitzroy).
- Raymond W. Ketchledge, 67, American engineer (computerized telephone switching control systems), cancer.
- Barry Levinson, 54–55, American film producer.
- Len McConnell, 80, Australian rules footballer.
- A. L. Morton, 84, English Marxist historian.
- Jimmy Mullen, 64, English international footballer (Wolverhampton Wanderers, England).
- Della H. Raney, 75, American nurse in the Army Nurse Corps.
- Gene Rodgers, 77, American jazz pianist, composer and arranger.
- Alejandro Scopelli, 79, Argentine international footballer and coach (Estudiantes, Argentina).
- Ted Taylor, 53, American blues singer, car crash.

=== 24 ===
- Hallam Ashley, 87, British photographer.
- Vallancey Brown, 74, Australian cricketer.
- Enid Chadwick, 84, British religious artist.
- Raymond Francis, 76, British actor (No Hiding Place).
- Leo Hepp, 80, Nazi German military officer in the Wehrmacht.
- Kelvin Martin, 23, American criminal, shot.
- Ray Sheppard, 84, American baseball player.

=== 25 ===
- Ivan Beshoff, appr. 104, Russian mutineer in 1905 on battleship Potemkin.
- Cecil Brown, 80, American journalist and war correspondent.
- Marta Feuchtwanger, 96, German exile to America, devoted life to promoting work of her deceased writer husband.
- Maxwell Finland, 85, Russian-born American medical researcher, expert on infectious diseases, heart attack.
- Louis Guttman, 71, American sociologist (social statistics), melanoma.
- Willis Jackson, 55, American jazz tenor saxophonist, complications from heart surgery.
- Pascal Jules, 26, French road bicycle racer.
- Gerald Pearson, 82, American physicist at Bell Labs (photovoltaic cell).
- J. A. Ratcliffe, 84, British radio physicist.
- Kate L. Turabian, 94, American educator and author (A Manual for Writers of Research Papers, Theses, and Dissertations).

=== 26 ===
- Herbert Anaya, 32–33, El Salvadoran president of the Human Rights Commission of El Salvador, assassinated.
- Greg Bautzer, 76, American attorney who represented famous clients, heart failure.
- Aldo Boffi, 72, Italian international footballer (AC Milan, Italy).
- Edith Luckett Davis, 99, American actress, mother of Nancy Reagan, stroke.
- Hugh Aloysius Donohoe, 82, American prelate.
- Arild Feldborg, 75, Norwegian playwright.
- Victor Ganz, 74, American business owner and art collector, lung cancer.
- Francisco Juillet, 89, Chilean Olympic cyclist (1924, 1928).
- Carolus Lassila, 65, Finnish diplomat, ambassador to eight countries, flash flood.
- Bjørge Lillelien, 60, Norwegian sports journalist and commentator (Norwegian Broadcasting Corporation), cancer.
- Zdzisław Wojdylak, 58, Polish Olympic field hockey player (1952, 1960).
- Adam Wolanin, 67, Polish-American international footballer (Pogoń Lwów, United States).

=== 27 ===
- Marshal T. Adams, 101, American politician, member of the Mississippi State Senate (1916–1924).
- Burnett Bolloten, 77–78, British-American writer, scholar of the Spanish Civil War, prostate cancer.
- Jorge Dalto, 39, Argentine-born American pianist, cancer.
- Jean Hélion, 83, French painter, pneumonia.
- John Oliver Killens, 71, American novelist, cancer.
- Kosaraju, 82, Indian lyricist and poet.
- Vijay Merchant, 76, Indian test cricketer (Bombay, India).
- Mario Merola, 65, American attorney and member of New York City Council, stroke.
- John C. Young, 75, American businessman, developer of Chinatown, San Francisco.

=== 28 ===
- D. Djajakusuma, 69, Indonesian film director.
- Douglas Mackessack, 84, Scottish cricketer and army officer.
- André Masson, 91, French artist.
- Pete McClanahan, 81, American MLB player (Pittsburgh Pirates).
- Sir Jasper More, 80, British politician, Member of Parliament.

=== 29 ===
- Albert P. Crary, 76, American polar geophysicist and glaciologist, first to set foot on both North and South Poles, spinal tumour.
- William Davis, 86, British Royal Navy admiral.
- Robert Heber-Percy, 75, English eccentric.
- Woody Herman, 74, American jazz clarinetist, saxophonist and big band leader, heart failure.
- Phillip C. Katz, 97, American soldier, Medal of Honor recipient.
- Kamal el-Mallakh, 69, Egyptian archaeologist, discovered Khufu ship.
- Ram Awtar Sharma, 79, Indian politician, member of Lok Sabha.
- Peter Stopforth, 79, South African cricketer.
- Frederic M. Wheelock, 85, American Latin professor (Wheelock's Latin), heart attack.

=== 30 ===
- Thomas G. Bergin, 82, American scholar of Italian literature.
- Joseph Campbell, 83, American writer on comparative mythology and religion (The Hero with a Thousand Faces), cancer.
- Sydney Vernon Petersen, 73, South African poet and author, kidney failure.
- Chaudhary Dalbir Singh, 61, Indian politician, member of Lok Sabha.
- Grady B. Wilson, 67–68, American evangelist, heart failure.

=== 31 ===
- Paul D. Adams, 81, American general in the U.S. Army.
- Raj Chandra Bose, 86, Indian and American mathematician and statistician (error-correcting codes).
- Ruel Vance Churchill, 87, American mathematician and author.
- Josef Erber, 90, Nazi German SS-Oberscharführer at Auschwitz, received life sentence, traffic accident.
- Maurie Hunter, 83, Australian rules footballer.
- Jimmy Jewell, 33–34, British rock climber, climbing accident.
- Hans Sommer, 73, Nazi German member of the Sicherheitsdienst, Stasi spy.
- Jack Stenhouse, 75, Australian rules footballer.
- George Sulima, 59, American NFL player (Pittsburgh Steelers).

=== Unknown date ===
- Filippo Buccola, 101, Italian-American mobster, member of the Patriarca crime family.
- Wally Freeman, 94, British Olympic athlete (1920).
