= Kreyer =

Kreyer is a surname. It can refer to the following people:

- Frank Kreyer (b.1970), US racecar driver
- Georgij Karlovich Kreyer (1887-1942), Russian botanist and mycologist
- Hubert Stanley Kreyer (1890–1949), British brigadier
- Joachim Kreyer (b.1956), German politician
- Norbert Kreyer (b.1952), German former Formula One engineer
- Robin Kreyer (1910-1987), English cricketer and soldier
- Rolf Kreyer (b.1973), German linguist
- Scott Kreyer, original member of Canadian rock band Toronto
- Sven Kreyer (b.1991), German footballer
- Vitold Kreyer (b.1932), Russian retired triple jumper
