= Aero Trasporti Italiani Flight 460 =

1987 aviation accident

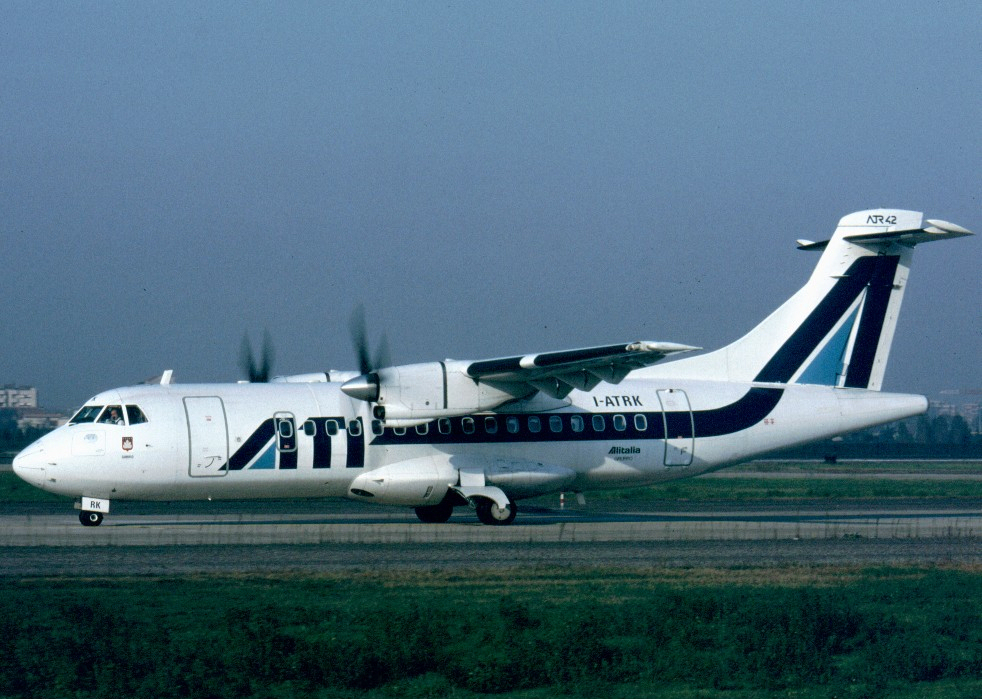
- An ATR 42-300, similar to the one involved

Accident
- Date: 15 October 1987
- Summary: Icing and design flaw
- Site: Mount Crezzo, Conca di Crezzo, Italy; 45.9094°N 9.2834°E

Aircraft
- Aircraft type: ATR 42-312
- Aircraft name: Verona
- Operator: Aero Trasporti Italiani
- IATA flight No.: BM460
- ICAO flight No.: ATI 460
- Call sign: ATI 460
- Registration: I-ATRH
- Flight origin: Milan Linate Airport, Milan, Italy
- Destination: Cologne Bonn Airport, Cologne, West Germany
- Occupants: 37
- Passengers: 34
- Crew: 3
- Fatalities: 37
- Survivors: 0

Aero Trasporti Italiani Flight 460 was a scheduled passenger flight between Milan Linate Airport in Milan, Italy and Cologne Bonn Airport in Cologne, Germany on 15 October 1987. The flight was operated by Aero Trasporti Italiani (ATI), a subsidiary of Alitalia, using an ATR-42 turboprop aircraft.

Icing conditions existed at the time and 15 minutes after takeoff, while climbing through FL147 (14,700 feet (4,500 m)) in IAS hold mode (constant speed set at 133 knots (246 km/h; 153 mph)) the aircraft rolled left and right before crashing nose down into a 700-metre-high (2,300 ft) mountain following an uncontrolled descent. All 37 on board the aircraft were killed.

== Accident ==
The aircraft took off from Milan-Linate Airport at 19:13. The flight had a 53-minute delay due to air traffic and bad weather. After about fifteen minutes the aircraft was climbing to an altitude of 14,700 ft, in IAS hold mode at a constant speed of 133 knots, when it began a rotation movement to the right and left: 41 ° to the right, 100 ° to the left then 105 ° to the right and 135 ° to the left. The ATR 42 also performed three anomalous downward trim changes and was then unable to recover the necessary altitude. The aircraft fell nose-first towards the ground along the slopes of the mountain at about 700 m above sea level after an uncontrolled descent. The aircraft crashed at 19:29 around Mount Crezzo. All 37 people on board died.

== Aircraft ==
The aircraft involved in the accident was an Aerospatiale ATR 42-312, serial number 046, registered as I-ATRH and named "Città di Verona". It was delivered brand new to ATI on 14 May 1987 equipped with two Pratt and Whitney PW120 turboprop engines. The aircraft was manufactured in Toulouse, France and held the test registration of F-WWEZ prior to delivery. Its first test flight was made on 24 April 1987.

== Crew and passengers ==
Flight 460 had a crew of three. Lamberto Lainè (43) was the pilot, Pierluigi Lampronti (29) was the co-pilot and Carla Corneliani (35) was the flight attendant.

Originally, 46 seats on the aircraft had been sold however only 30 passengers with reservations arrived on time. With the delay, a further four passengers were able to board the aircraft. The majority of the passengers were Germans and five Italians, including two infants. One notable passenger was German racing driver and two time Nürburgring 24 Hours champion, Axel Felder.

== Investigation ==
Local eye-witness reports suggested that the aircraft had crashed into a mountain in the Mount Crezzo area of the Alps, near Lake Como and the towns of Magreglio and Barni. Local weather conditions at the time were poor, with heavy rain in the area of the crash. Early search for the aircraft was completed by rescue workers beaming a spotlight on the mountainside from the lakefront at Onno.

By the day following the crash, investigators located the aircraft and all 37 passengers and crew. They confirmed there were no survivors. At the same time one of the two black boxes was recovered. The following day, the second black box was recovered from the crash site.

Investigations by the Carabinieri Investigative Unit of the Provincial Command of Como and the Italian Air Force showed that the weather conditions had caused the formation of ice on the wings of the ATR 42. The crew had failed to understand that the ice and the low speed would have stalled the plane. Instead, some of their maneuvers to regain speed, likely combined with poor management of the trim, led the plane to point towards the ground until it crashed into the mountain.

An judicial investigation led to a trial that saw the designer of the ATR 42 aircraft, Jean Rech, and three senior executives of ATI convicted for manslaughter. However, in 1995 these sentences were annulled and all four men were acquitted.

== In popular culture ==
It was briefly mentioned on Air Crash Investigation Season 7 episode "Frozen in Flight", which depicted American Eagle Flight 4184, during the part depicting similar incidents with the ATR-72 involving icing conditions.

== See also ==
- American Eagle Flight 4184
- Aero Caribbean Flight 883
- Voepass Flight 2283
