= Vallancey =

Vallancey is both a given name and a surname. Notable people with the name include:

- Vallancey Brown (1912–1987), Australian cricketer
- Charles Vallancey (1731–1812), British military surveyor
- F. Hugh Vallancey (1879–1950), English schoolmaster
