= Code 60 flag =

Motorsport safety procedure

A visual representation of the Code 60 board.

Code 60 (also known as a slow zone) is a safety procedure used in motorsport. An alternative to the safety car or full-course yellow, the procedure is designed to neutralise isolated sections of a circuit when an incident occurs rather than the whole track.

== History ==
The system was created by Huub Vermuelen and the Dutch National Racing Team in the late-2000s. Instead of freezing races behind a safety car and closing all of the gaps between the competitors when circuit conditions are deemed unsafe, the Code 60 slows competitors to a set speed in section/s of a circuit where it is not safe to continue at racing speed, thereby allowing racing to continue in unaffected parts of the track.

Having been initially trialled at Zandvoort, its first major implementation came at the Dubai 24 Hour in the early-2010s. Creventic, the operator of the Dubai 24 Hour, has since adopted the procedure for all events in its 24H Series competition. The Code 60 practice was also adopted on the Nürburgring for its NLS and 24-hour events as the track is too long for safety cars to be effective. In 2016, Motorsport UK adopted the procedure for domestic club racing.

Code 60 procedure is considered advantageous because they maintain the race order without affecting gaps between the cars, whilst also keeping competitors and marshals safe; however, Code 60s can also be viewed as detracting from the entertainment value of races, given safety car periods bunch competitors together and encourage close racing on restarts.

=== In operation ===
At the Nürburgring, a slow zone is implemented as follows:

- Two marshals' posts before an incident, a single yellow flag will be waved to caution drivers of an approaching hazard.
- At the intermediary marshals' post, double-waved yellow flags will be displayed. This requires drivers to slow to 120kph and prepares them to negotiate the incident site.
- At the marshals' post affected by the incident, a single yellow flag will be displayed alongside the pink Code 60 board. Drivers must slow to 60kph and maintain that speed through all the marshals' posts that are affected by the incident.
- At the first marshals' post clear of the incident, a green flag will be shown and drivers can return to racing speed.

== See also ==
- Racing flags
