= Nürburgring 24 Hours =

24-hour annual touring car and GT endurance racing event

ADAC RAVENOL Nürburgring 24 Hours

- Venue: Nürburgring
- Corporate sponsor: Ravenol
- First race: 1970
- Duration: 24 hours
- Previous names: Zürich ADAC 24 Hours Nürburgring; ADAC TotalEnergies 24h Nürburgring
- Most wins (driver): Timo Bernhard (5); Pedro Lamy; Marcel Tiemann
- Most wins (team): Manthey Racing (7); Phoenix Racing
- Most wins (manufacturer): BMW (21)

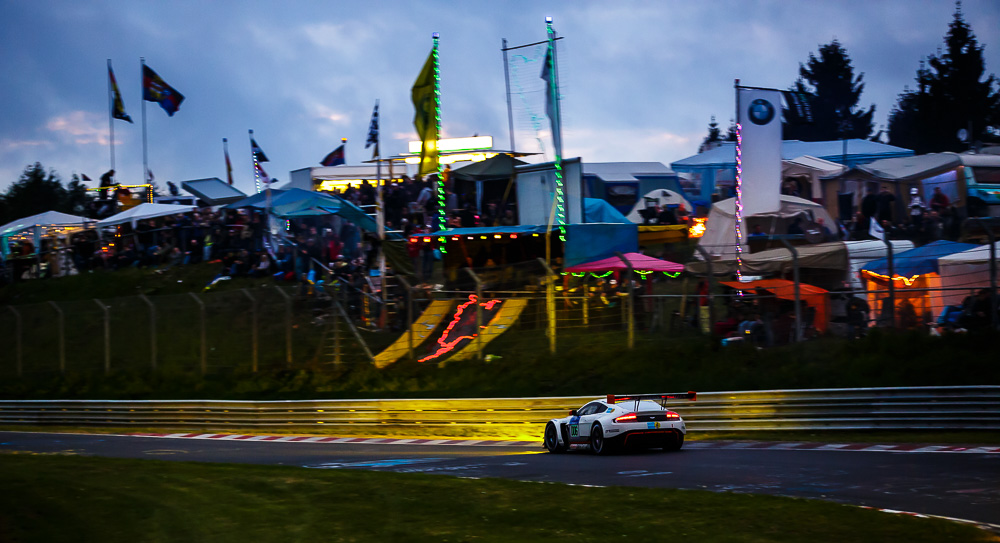
Spectators along the track near Hatzenbach/Hocheichen

The Nürburgring 24 Hours is a 24-hour annual touring car and GT endurance racing event that takes place on a combination of the Nordschleife ("North Loop") and the GP-Strecke ("Grand Prix track") circuits of the Nürburgring in Rhineland-Palatinate, Germany. Held since 1970, the over 25.3 km (15.7 mi) lap length allows more than 200 cars and over 700 drivers to participate.

Starting in 2024, the event has been officially named ADAC RAVENOL 24h Nürburgring for sponsorship reasons. Also since 2024, the race has been included in the Intercontinental GT Challenge calendar.

== Overview ==
Officially called "ADAC 24h Rennen Nürburgring" in German ('ADAC 24 hour Race Nürburgring'), it was introduced in 1970 by the ADAC as an official race, unlike the earlier endurance contests that covered 12, 24 (in 1961 and 1967), 36, 84 and even 96 hours, like the Marathon de la Route. This substitute for the Liège-Rome-Liège and Liège-Sofia-Liège rallies was held on the Nürburgring from 1965 to 1971.

It is similar to the Spa 24 Hours, which had been introduced in 1924, following the 24 Hours of Le Mans. The ADAC had held its first 1000 km Nürburgring sports car racing event in 1953. As the 1000 km Spa had been introduced in 1966, the 24h at the Ring gave both circuits a pair of endurance racing events at very long tracks, at least until Spa was shortened in 1979.

Just like the VLN series with its 4-hour races, the 24h race is mainly aimed at amateurs, in order to fill a starting field of around 200 cars. Unlike the VLN races, the 24h is officially an international event, with trilingual (French, German and English, since 2024 because SRO regulations are in French) organization and documentation. Entry fees are due, in 2010 these were €7,508 per car, of which €3,000 was an advance payment for fuel. Typical entries range from second hand standard road cars to European Touring Car Championship vehicles and GT3 sports cars like the Porsche 911 GT3. The participation of manufactures and professional teams and drivers has varied over the decades. As spectator numbers had dropped in the 1990s when only rather standard FIA Group N cars competed, more spectacular vehicles were admitted since 1999, like the Zakspeed Chrysler Viper GTS-R which originally was built by Oreca to FIA GT2-spec, turbo-charged Porsche, modified Deutsche Tourenwagen Masters cars from Opel and Abt Sportsline-Audi, and the Schnitzer Motorsport-entered BMW M3 GTR V8 that had been run in the 2001 American Le Mans Series.

Due to various changes and versions of the Grand Prix Strecke, the overall length of the track varied from the original 22.835 km (14.189 mi) to nearly 26 km (16.2 mi) of the maximum length configuration which was in use in 2002 and 2003, after the GP track had been extended by the Mercedes Arena. As this section and its large paved run-off areas was useful as extra paddock zone for the competitors of the support races, it is bypassed with a sharp Z-shape chicane since 2005 for a 25.3 km (15.7 mi) track length.

The number of cars starting is limited to 150 as of 2024, driven by up to 600 drivers, as 2, 3 or 4 can share a car. One driver is allowed to drive 150 minutes non-stop, and can enter on two cars, yet a rest time of at least 2 hours has to be observed between two turns of the same driver.

The race is typically held in May or June on the Ascension Day or Corpus Christi holiday. The 2013 edition was held on Pentecost. The 2020 race was postponed to September and held with limited spectators, restricted to the Grand Prix course area (initially planned to be held behind closed doors) due to the COVID-19 pandemic. The 2024 race set a new shortest distance record of just 50 laps with less than 10 hours of racing due to rain and overnight fog; the 2023 race set a new longest distance run for the race, as well as the first win for Ferrari.

== Cars ==
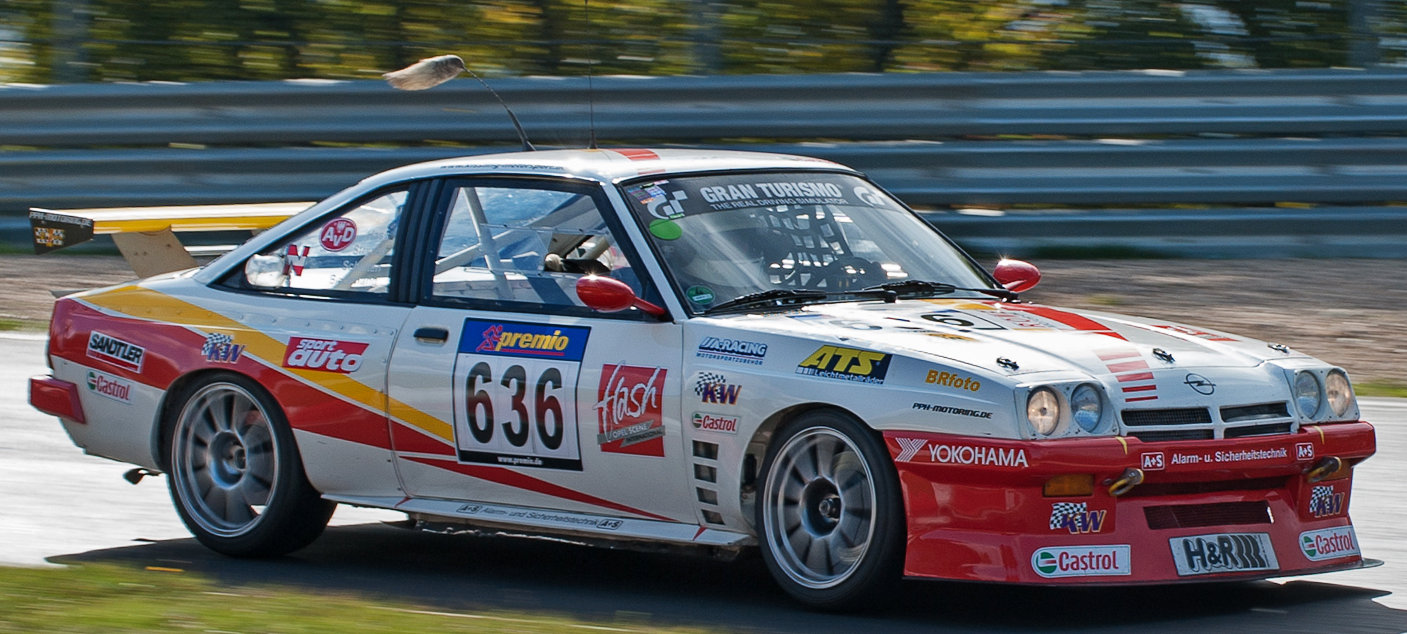
The Opel Manta SP3 was a regular participant between 1994 and 2023.

The Nurburgring 24 Hours is known for its wide variety of cars. In 2023, 135 cars in 20 classes were entered. Available classes include:

- The 24h-Special classes that consist of pure race cars that may compete in other race series. It consists of the classes SP1 to SP8 differentiated by engine displacement with an optional suffix T for turbocharged engines, the SP9 class for FIA GT3 cars, the SP10 class for SRO GT4 cars.
- The VLN production cars classes that intend to allow relatively low-cost racing with near-series cars. It consists of several classes of normally-aspirated cars (V3 to V6), and several classes of turbocharged cars (VT1 to VT3, with separate classes for front-wheel drive cars), differentiated by engine displacement.
- Cup classes(BMW M240i, BMW M2 CS, Porsche 911 GT3 Cup, Porsche Cayman GT4 Clubsport).
- TCR touring car.
- AT class for cars using alternative fuels.

The race has often seen cars that are rarely used in other international racing events. Examples include Fiat Cinquecentos in the 1990s, a Volkswagen Caravelle in 2000, the P4/5 Competizione in the 2010s, or a 1988 Opel Manta that has raced from 1994 to 2023.

== Safety ==
A Code 60 flag

Due to the length of the track, the Nürburgring 24 Hours has unusual safety procedures compared to other modern professional endurance races. Safety cars are not used except during red flag and ensuing restart situations, double yellow flags indicate a local speed limit of 120 km/h (75 mph), and code 60 flags, used locally for incidents warranting a safety car on shorter tracks, limit the speed to 60 km/h (37 mph). It is common for course cars and vehicle recovery trucks to travel around the course under local double yellow flags. Since 2015; competitors must hold a valid "DMSB Permit Nordschleife", a license to race specifically on the Nordschleife section of the Nürburgring. They must also take part in 3 races on the track within the last 2 calendar years.

Closing speeds between the fastest and slowest car classes is a common concern, as the track has many blind crests and corners. In 2023, a serious accident happened between a Porsche 911 GT3 R and a Dacia Logan SP3 - the slowest car in the field that year - after the Porsche hit the Logan at the high-speed Stefan-Bellof-S and sent it into the barriers.

The unpredictable Eifel weather is also a danger. Heavy rain and fog stopped the race for several hours in 2018, 2020 and 2021, while the 2016 race was red-flagged due to an unusual hailstorm that caused a series of crashes.

In 2001, driver Christian Peruzzi was killed after a practice accident in an Alfa Romeo 147.

== Support races ==
The Nürburgring 24 Hours has several support races on Thursday, Friday and Saturday, some happening on the GP Track, some happening on the Nordschleife only, some happening on the combined track.

As of 2023, the support program includes the Rundstrecken Challenge Nürburgring, and several historic touring cars and GT races. The last support race is the ADAC 24h-Classic, a 3-hour race on the combined track on Saturday morning, several hours before the 24 Hours race.

== History ==
=== 2006 race ===
Unlike the two previous races, held on Ascension Day weekend in May in rainy and very cold weather, the 2006 event was run in warm, sunny and dry conditions on Corpus Christi (feast) weekend of June 17–18. Pure factory teams that challenged for the overall win were absent, yet Aston Martin and Maserati had entered factory-backed cars to promote their products, reminding of three overall wins each in the 1000 km Nürburgring decades ago. The Aston Martin car with Aston CEO Ulrich Bez finished 4th in class and 24th overall.

Due to good conditions and stiff competition by similar cars, a new overall distance record (3,832 km (2,381 mi) in 151 laps) was scored by the Porsche 996 GT3 of Manthey Racing that already had been the best privateer team in the previous three years. This team is partially supported by Porsche, though, with factory drivers, a 3.8L 500 PS (370 kW; 490 hp) engine and a sequential gear box. Second place finishers Jürgen Alzen/Uwe Alzen/Klaus Ludwig/Christian Abt of team Jürgen Alzen Motorsport was only one lap down and have beaten the old record, too. They used a conventional gear box and a privately built 3.8L 500PS engine. The third of three fastest Porsche, the Wolfgang Land Motorsport 911, had suffered a fiery failure of its standard 3.6L Porsche 911 GT3-RSR race engine after 21 hours, yet was classified as 14th with 133 laps.

A remarkable 5th place overall was scored by a BMW 120d from Schubert Motors, which had roughly half the power of some of the cars it beat. It was driven by Claudia Hürtgen (2005 VLN champion), Marc Hennerici (2005 privateer WTCC champion), Johannes Stuck (son of Hans-Joachim Stuck) and team owner Torsten Schubert.

=== 2007 race ===
For the 2007 event held on Corpus Christi weekend of June 7–10, more than 260 teams had applied for the 220 race entries. Prior to the start which had been scheduled for 15:00, an approaching thunderstorm made the organizers delay the beginning of the race. Lightning struck the camp of fans, injuring several, while heavy rain made the track muddy. At 16:51, the race was started after two laps behind a safety car. Veteran Klaus Ludwig at the wheel of the Aston Martin DBRS9 which had been given the number 007 took the lead in wet conditions, but hesitating too long with the change to dry tyres, the favorite Manthey team took the lead in their new Porsche 997 GT3-RSR. More weather-related drama occurred in the night, when the race was interrupted due to fog for six hours, making the race 18 hours.

When the race resumed, the Land Porsche 996 GT3-RSR was slightly damaged when hitting the back of the Manthey car, and the Aston Martin engine failed. Thus the Manthey team could easily defend its 2006 victory. The reliable, yet no more fast enough Zakspeed Dodge Viper GTS-R came in second, with the Alzen brothers Porsche Cayman in 4th and the BMW Z4 M-Coupe 5th.

Remarkable performances were the top ten finishes of a VW Golf 5, an Opel Astra GTC and a BMW 130i, and the 13th place of a Hyundai Coupe V6 piloted by ex British Touring Car racer Peter Cate.

=== 2008 race ===
For the 2008, over 270 cars were entered, of which only 230 could be accepted. The race began in sunny weather with drama for the favorite Porsche teams of Manthey and Land, losing time with a leaky radiator and a tire failure, and the new Alzen 997 Turbo and the Zakspeed Viper battling for the lead. After the Viper was out, only the BMW Z4 (E85) of Claudia Hürtgen, pole setter and winner of the recent VLN race, could challenge the Porsche armada and lead for some laps, but it crashed during the night.

Manthey could catch up and win the race for a third time in a row, with the winning car of 2006 (a 996 model) finishing 2nd. The triumph made the team mechanics cut off Olaf Manthey's famous moustache tips. Sabine Schmitz came in third, also on a Porsche 997. A strong showing among the high powered cars gave the three new Volkswagen Scirocco, finishing 9th and 12th, with veteran Hans Joachim Stuck driving both cars.

=== 2009 race ===
For 2009, the organizers announced that they wanted to reduce the gap in speeds, by not accepting small capacity cars any more, and by slowing down the fastest classes, SP7 and SP8. Also, the new FIA GT3 and FIA GT4 classes were adopted, called SP9 and SP10. Some of the new rules are controversial, especially the fact that instead of the regular fuel pumps as used in any public station, the top teams have to use expensive equipment designed to equal the times needed to refill, meaning that an economic car is punished compared to a thirsty car. Due to the various rule changes, some teams have declined to take part, namely Zakspeed with their Viper.

Probably also due to the economic crisis, the number of entries was much lower than in previous years, with only 170 cars starting the race. Surprisingly, the pole was set by a Ford GT, followed closely by the four factory-entered Audi R8 LMS and two Porsche GT3 of the Manthey team. They decided to enter their well-known RSR, which is basically a GT2 car, but now has about 70 hp less due to new air restrictors, and also a 997 GT3 Cup S, the version Porsche homologated for FIA GT3. For the first 19 hours, two of the Audis and the two Manthey Porsche battled for the lead within a lap, the pace likely to result in a new distance record. The Manthey #1 had been punished for approaching an accident site too quickly and had to wait 3 minutes in the box, but the decision was reverted later based on data logging evidence, with the lost time deducted from the results. Around 11:30, the #99 Audi which had a narrow lead was stopped by suspension problems. Following repairs this car finished in 5th position. This left the #97 Audi in second, and with the win in its class, 5 minutes behind the overall winner.

=== 2010 race ===
The 2010 event on Ascension Day weekend of May 13–16 saw a return of most prominent entries, except the Ford GT, as team Raeder had discontinued this project. To give teams time to rest or for repairs before the race, the night practice was scheduled on Thursday evening. In cold and wet conditions, the Farnbacher-entered Ferrari F430 GTC set the best lap time before the session was red-flagged due to fog. In Friday afternoon qualifying, held in fair weather, it crashed out and was barely repaired in time for the race. Four of the five factory-backed Audi R8 LMS (officially entered by "customers", which happen to be the Audi-DTM-teams Phoenix Racing and Abt Sportsline) occupied the first four places on the grid, with Marco Werner setting pole at 8:24.753 with a new record average speed of 181 km/h (112 mph). With lap times around 8:29, three of Porsche's new SP9/GT3-class cars occupied places 5 to 7, two of them entered by four-time winner Team Manthey, which had chosen to let the #1 car do only a single lap. BMW had entered two of their ALMS BMW M3 GT2, run by Schnitzer Motorsport. Due to the modifications that include a transaxle gear box, they do not comply to the standard rules set of SP classes and their "Balance of Performance". Along with a factory-entered Porsche GT3 Hybrid, the M3s were classed as E1-XP entries (the E1-XP class was actually intended for experimental factory entries). The better BMW and the Hybrid posted times of 8:32 and 8:34 in qualifying. Save for the 16th placed GT3-class Dodge Viper, only several other Porsche, Audi R8 and V8-powered BMW Z4 (E89) have qualified in the top 20, with times up to 8:47, which earns them a blue flash light that is supposed to facilitate passing of the approx. 180 slower cars.

Porsche test driver Walter Röhrl had intended to enter on a standard road legal Porsche 911 GT3 RS, but had to withdraw for health reasons from the team that comprises racers Roland Asch and Patrick Simon, plus journalists Horst von Saurma and Chris Harris. The car, entered in cooperation with sport auto (Germany), is registered as S-GO 2400, and was driven from Weissach to Nürburg. It has qualified with 9:15, 42nd overall, and 9th among the 17 SP7 class entrants, only beaten by its race-prepped Porsche 997 siblings.

The race was started on Saturday 3 p.m. in sunny but cold weather. Already on the Grand Prix track, the #1 Manthey Porsche driven by five-time winner Marcel Tiemann passed all Audis, taking the lead and pulling away about 100 m (330 ft) before catching up in lap 2 with the slowest cars of the third group, which were still in their first lap. After lap 3, three Porsche lead ahead of three Audi, a BMW M3 and the Hybrid-Porsche, which due to his larger range could take the lead after the others pitted. The #1 Manthey Porsche led by a couple of minutes until got involved in a collision after seven hours. At halftime, the race is on pace to another distance record, with the Audi #99 leading by a small margin ahead of the Hybrid Porsche, the only remaining representative of his brand in the top 8, which used to be dominated by Porsche in recent years. Places three to eight were occupied by three Audi R8, two BMW, and, rather surprisingly, on p 5 the Ferrari which had started in row 21. The Porsches that occupy most places up to 15th were followed by the CNG-powered Volkswagen Scirocco GT24, the road-legal Porsche GT3 RS and a Nissan Z33. On Sunday morning, the #99 Audi needed a rear axle change, and with less than 5 hours to go, also the second place #2 Audi failed. This left the Hybrid Porsche in a one lap lead ahead of the #25 BMW GT2 with gearbox woes and the Ferrari, until also the Porsche stopped with less than two hours to go. The BMW made it to the finish, giving Pedro Lamy a record-tying fifth win ahead of Ferrari and Audi. The best Porsche, entered by Alzen, finished only sixth, six laps ahead of the Falken Nissan and the road legal GT3.

The SP4 class was won by 4 Argentinian drivers in the BMW 325i E92 Coupe of Motorsport Team Sorg Rennsport. This was the first victory for an Argentinian team at the Nürburgring 24 Hours race and the first Argentinian team to compete in the Nürburgring since Juan Manuel Fangio.

=== 2011 race ===
With Corpus Christi weekend being rather late in 2011 on June 23–26, the 2011 event was held two weeks after the 2011 24 Hours of Le Mans. The first five VLN races of 2011 were won by a factory-entered BMW, a GT3-class Mercedes SLS, a new Ferrari 458, the Hybrid Porsche GT3 and finally an Audi R8 LMS, so at least these five different brands were expected to challenge for the overall win in the 24 hours. In the first qualifying session, the Hankook-sponsored Farnbacher-Ferrari used soft tyres and was about 7 seconds faster than the competitors, lapping at an average speed of over 181 km/h, the fastest since 1983, when it was still run with prototype cars. This earned the team the pole position, but also an extra weight of 25 kg in the pre-race update of the ‘Balance of Performance’. Team Manthey decided to find out in the early stages of the race which class was more effective under the current conditions, entering their four Porsche factory drivers on two yellow and green Porsche 997 GT3: two pilots shared the #11 SP9/GT3-spec ‘R’, which had more power and qualified 8th, two others the #18 SP7/GT2-class ‘RSR’, which had more downforce, but was only 16th on the grid. After a few hours in changing weather conditions, the team retired the ‘R’ to focus on the ‘RSR’ which already had won three times since 2007. Without any problems, it went on to win its fourth Nürburgring 24 Hours, with a new distance record of 156 laps. Second place was taken by another GT2-spec car, the #1 factory BMW M3 GT which had won in 2010. Five GT3 cars of Audi and Mercedes followed. The SP8/GT2-class #2 Ferrari had run into early problems, but set the fastest race lap in the final hours, finishing 8th and James Glickenhaus’ P4/5 Competizione finished 39th, second in the E1-XP2.

After 2010 Sorg Rennsport took the victory in class SP4 again. Gianvito Rossi, Diego Romanini, Alfredo Varini and Alexander Rappold have been the only team in that class.

=== 2012 race ===
The 40th ADAC Zurich 24-Hour Race ran on Saturday, May 19, 14:00 to Sunday, May 20, 2012, 14:00.

The 2012 event was the first to have a "Top 40" qualifying shootout for the 40 fastest cars on the starting grid, which took place on the Friday after the first 2 qualifying sessions.

The #3 Phoenix Racing Team won the race in an Audi R8 LMS.

=== 2013 race ===
The 2013 race saw Aston Martin's hydrogen powered car run the first ever zero-emissions lap of the circuit. The race also saw the first ever win for a Mercedes.

The #9 Team Black Falcon won the race in a Mercedes-AMG GT3.

=== 2014 race ===
The 2014 race set a new record for the total distance driven during a Nürburgring 24-hour race with 4,035 km (159 laps) driven by the top two cars.

The #4 Phoenix Racing Team won the race in an Audi R8 LMS.

=== 2015 race ===
The #28 Audi Sport Team WRT won the race in an Audi R8 LMS.

=== 2016 race ===
The #4 AMG-Team Black Falcon won the race in a Mercedes-AMG GT3. Mercedes took 1-2-3-4 finish.

=== 2017 race ===
The #29 Audi Sport Team Land / Montaplast Land-Motorsport Team won the race in an Audi R8 LMS.

=== 2018 race ===
The #912 Manthey Racing Team won the race in a Porsche 911 GT3 R.

=== 2019 race ===
The #4 Phoenix Racing Team won the race in an Audi R8 LMS Evo.

=== 2020 race ===
Traditionally held in May, it was announced on March that the race will be postponed to September 24–27 due to the COVID-19 pandemic. The event was initially planned to be held behind closed doors, but later a limited amount of spectators were admitted. Rowe Racing (BMW M6 GT3) won the event, the first for BMW in 10 years, although the race was interrupted for most of the night due to inclement weather.

=== 2021 race ===
The 2021 race was won by the Porsche-based Manthey Racing, who was forced to sit out the previous year's race due to COVID-19 concerns involving the team crew. A new record low of 58 laps (and less than ten hours of actual racing) was covered, as the race was once again interrupted for most of the night due to inclement weather.

=== 2022 race ===
The 50th anniversary 2022 race took place on 28–29 May 2022. A total of 159 laps were completed by the winning car #15 from Scherer Sport Team Phoenix.

=== 2023 race ===
The #30 Frikadelli Racing Team won the race in a Ferrari 296 GT3 completing a total of 162 laps. The race set a new distance record and also marks Ferrari's first ever Nürburgring 24 Hours victory.

== Winners ==
Year	Drivers	Car	Team	Laps	Remarks
1970	(Germany) Clemens Schickentanz (Germany) Hans-Joachim Stuck	BMW 2002 TI	(Germany) Koepchen BMW Tuning	123	
1971	(Germany) Ferfried Prinz von Hohenzollern (Austria) Gerold Pankl	BMW 2002	(Germany) Alpina	125	
1972	(Germany) Helmut Kelleners (Austria) Gerold Pankl	BMW 2800 CS	(Germany) Alpina	145	
1973	(Germany) Hans-Peter Joisten (Austria) Niki Lauda	BMW 3.0 CSL	(Germany) Alpina (3)	95	Race held in two heats of 8h each, with 8h break at midnight.
1974	Race not held due to oil crisis				
1975	Race not held due to oil crisis				
1976	(Germany) Herbert Hechler (Germany) Fritz Müller (Germany) Karl-Heinz Quirin	Porsche 911 Carrera		134	
1977	(Germany) Herbert Hechler (Germany) Fritz Müller	Porsche 911 Carrera		140	
1978	(Germany) Franz Gschwendtner (Germany) Herbert Hechler (Germany) Fritz Müller	Porsche 911 Carrera	(Germany) Valvoline Deutschland	142	
1979	(Germany) Herbert Kummle (Germany) Karl Mauer (Germany) Winfried Vogt	Ford Escort	(Germany) Cavallo Matras	140	
1980	(Germany) Matthias Schneider (Germany) Dieter Selzer (Germany) Wolfgang Wolf	Ford Escort RS 2000	(Germany) Berkenkamp Racing	137	
1981	(Germany) Helmut Döring (Germany) Dieter Gartmann (Germany) Fritz Müller	Ford Capri	(Germany) Gilden Kölsch	132	
1982	(Germany) Dieter Gartmann (Germany) Klaus Ludwig (Germany) Klaus Niedzwiedz	Ford Capri	(Germany) Eichberg Racing	138	
1983	Race not held due to construction work				
1984	(Germany) Franz-Josef Bröhling (Germany) Axel Felder (Germany) Peter Oberndorfer	BMW 635 CSi	(Germany) Auto Budde Team	127	
1985	(Germany) Axel Felder (Germany) Jürgen Hamelmann (Germany) Robert Walterscheid-Müller	BMW 635 CSi	(Germany) Auto Budde Team	128	
1986	(Germany) Markus Oestreich (Germany) Otto Rensing (Germany) Winfried Vogt	BMW 325i	(Germany) Auto Budde Team	130	
1987	(Germany) Klaus Ludwig (Germany) Klaus Niedzwiedz (United Kingdom) Steve Soper	Ford Sierra RS Cosworth	(Switzerland) Eggenberger Motorsport	135	First win by a turbocharged car.
1988	(Germany) Edgar Dören (Germany) Peter Faubel (Germany) Gerhard Holup	Porsche 911 Carrera RSR	(Germany) Dören	140	The privateer '74 Porsche beats modern factory-backed turbocharged Fords.
1989	(France) Fabien Giroix (Italy) Emanuele Pirro (Italy) Roberto Ravaglia	BMW M3	(Italy) Team Bigazzi	143	
1990	(Germany) Altfrid Heger (Germany) Frank Schmickler (Germany) Joachim Winkelhock	BMW M3 Evo. 2	(Germany) Linder Motorsport	144	
1991	(Germany) Armin Hahne (Denmark) Kris Nissen (Germany) Joachim Winkelhock	BMW M3 Evo. 2	(Germany) Schnitzer Motorsport	138	
1992	(Venezuela) Johnny Cecotto (Germany) Christian Danner (Belgium) Marc Duez (Belgium) Jean-Michel Martin	BMW M3 Evo. 2	(Italy) Team Bigazzi	76	Race stopped for hours due to fog.
1993	(Brazil) "Tonico de Azevedo" (Germany) Frank Katthöfer (Austria) Franz Konrad (Sweden) Örnulf Wirdheim	Porsche 911 Carrera	(Austria) Konrad Motorsport	129	
1994	(Germany) Frank Katthöfer (Germany) Fred Rosterg (Germany) Karl-Heinz Wlazik	BMW M3		106	
1995	(Germany) Alexander Burgstaller (Belgium) Marc Duez (Italy) Roberto Ravaglia	BMW 320i	(Italy) Team Bigazzi	129	
1996	(Germany) Johannes Scheid (Germany) Sabine Schmitz (Germany) Hans Widmann	BMW M3 E36	(Germany) Scheid Motorsport	135	First victory for a female race driver.
1997	(Germany) Johannes Scheid (Germany) Sabine Schmitz (Germany) Hans-Jürgen Tiemann (Germany) Peter Zakowski	BMW M3 E36	(Germany) Scheid Motorsport	126	
1998	(Germany) Andy Bovensiepen (Belgium) Marc Duez (Germany) Christian Menzel (Germany) Hans-Joachim Stuck	BMW 320d	(Germany) Schnitzer Motorsport	137	First Diesel victory in a major 24h race. After 28 years, a second win for Stuck, the first winner.
1999	(Belgium) Marc Duez (Germany) Klaus Ludwig (Germany) Hans-Jürgen Tiemann (Germany) Peter Zakowski	Chrysler Viper GTS-R	(Germany) Zakspeed	143	Return of powerful cars, with Viper dominating the season. None of the new water-cooled Porsche 996 GT3 is entered yet.
2000	(Germany) Uwe Alzen (Germany) Michael Bartels (Germany) Altfrid Heger (Germany) Bernd Mayländer	Porsche 911 GT3-R	(Germany) Porsche Zentrum Koblenz (Phoenix Racing)	145	Factory backed Porsche effort beats a very heavy Viper, and with 145 laps, the old distance record of 1990.
2001	(Germany) Michael Bartels (Portugal) Pedro Lamy (Germany) Peter Zakowski	Chrysler Viper GTS-R	(Germany) Zakspeed	147	
2002	(Portugal) Pedro Lamy (Austria) Robert Lechner (Germany) Peter Zakowski	Chrysler Viper GTS-R	(Germany) Zakspeed	141	
2003	(Germany) Manuel Reuter (Germany) Timo Scheider (Germany) Volker Strycek (Germany) Marcel Tiemann	Opel Astra V8 Coupé	(Germany) Phoenix Racing; OPC Team Phoenix	143	Three factories enter V8 powered race cars: Audi, BMW, Opel. Turbocharged Porsches by Manthey and Alzen.
2004	(Portugal) Pedro Lamy (Germany) Dirk Müller (Germany) Jörg Müller (Germany) Hans-Joachim Stuck	BMW M3 GTR	(Germany) BMW Motorsport (Schnitzer Motorsport)	143	BMW prevails against ABT-Audi in changing weather conditions.
2005	(Netherlands) Duncan Huisman (Portugal) Pedro Lamy (United Kingdom) Andy Priaulx (United States) Boris Said	BMW M3 GTR	(Germany) BMW Motorsport (Schnitzer Motorsport)	139	Final race for the M3 GTR V8.
2006	(Germany) Timo Bernhard (Germany) Lucas Luhr (Germany) Mike Rockenfeller (Germany) Marcel Tiemann	Porsche 996 GT3-MR	(Germany) Manthey Racing	151	Officially a private entry, supported by Porsche with drivers.
2007	(Germany) Timo Bernhard (France) Romain Dumas (Germany) Marc Lieb (Germany) Marcel Tiemann	Porsche 997 GT3-RSR	(Germany) Manthey Racing	112	Race stopped for about 6h due to fog.
2008	(Germany) Timo Bernhard (France) Romain Dumas (Germany) Marc Lieb (Germany) Marcel Tiemann	Porsche 997 GT3-RSR	(Germany) Manthey Racing	148	Winner came from 1 lap down up to nearly two laps ahead for victory.
2009	(Germany) Timo Bernhard (France) Romain Dumas (Germany) Marc Lieb (Germany) Marcel Tiemann	Porsche 997 GT3-RSR	(Germany) Manthey Racing	155	Record 5th victory for Tiemann, 4th in a row for Manthey.
2010	(Germany) Uwe Alzen (Brazil) Augusto Farfus (Portugal) Pedro Lamy (Germany) Jörg Müller	BMW M3 GT2	(Germany) BMW Motorsport (Schnitzer Motorsport)	154	Record-tying 5th victory for Lamy.
2011	(Germany) Timo Bernhard (France) Romain Dumas (Germany) Marc Lieb (Germany) Lucas Luhr	Porsche 997 GT3-RSR	(Germany) Manthey Racing	156	Record-tying 5th victory for Bernhard.
2012	(Germany) Marc Basseng (Germany) Christopher Haase (Germany) Frank Stippler (Germany) Markus Winkelhock	Audi R8 LMS ultra	(Germany) Audi Sport (Team Phoenix)	155	First ever victory for an Audi.
2013	(Netherlands) Jeroen Bleekemolen (United Kingdom) Sean Edwards (Germany) Bernd Schneider (Denmark) Nicki Thiim	Mercedes-Benz SLS AMG GT3	(Germany) Black Falcon	88	Race red flagged for 9 hours due to Rain. First win for a Mercedes-Benz.
2014	(Germany) Christopher Haase (Germany) Christian Mamerow (Germany) René Rast (Germany) Markus Winkelhock	Audi R8 LMS ultra	(Germany) Phoenix Racing	159	
2015	(Germany) Christopher Mies (Switzerland) Nico Müller (Sweden) Edward Sandström (Belgium) Laurens Vanthoor	Audi R8 LMS	(Belgium) Audi Sport Team WRT	156	During the first VLN 4 Hour race on March 28, Jann Mardenborough's Nissan GT-R (classified as SP9 for GT3 cars) sailed over the catchfence at Flugplatz, killing a spectator and injuring nine. During the ongoing investigation, ADAC imposed speed limits in Flugplatz, Schwedenkreuz and Antoniusbuche of 200 km/h (120 mph) and Döttinger Höhe Straight of 250 km/h (155 mph).
2016	(United Kingdom) Adam Christodoulou (Germany) Maro Engel (Germany) Manuel Metzger (Germany) Bernd Schneider	Mercedes-AMG GT3	(Germany) AMG Team Black Falcon	134	Special restrictions imposed on the 2015 race were repealed following circuit resurfacing and barrier improvementrs. Race red-flagged early on for 4 hours due to heavy rain, fog, and hail. Maro Engel overtook Christian Hohenadel on the last lap to lead a Mercedes-AMG 1-2-3-4.
2017	(United States) Connor De Phillippi (Germany) Christopher Mies (South Africa) Kelvin van der Linde (Germany) Markus Winkelhock	Audi R8 LMS	(Germany) Audi Sport Team Land	158	Primarily dry conditions for the race. Kelvin van der Linde became the first South African to win the 24 hours of Nurburgring overall.
2018	(Austria) Richard Lietz (France) Frédéric Makowiecki (France) Patrick Pilet (United Kingdom) Nick Tandy	Porsche 911 GT3 R	(Germany) Manthey Racing	135	Race red-flagged on Sunday for 2 hours due to heavy rain and fog.
2019	(Germany) Pierre Kaffer (Germany) Frank Stippler (Belgium) Dries Vanthoor (Belgium) Frédéric Vervisch	Audi R8 LMS Evo	(Germany) Audi Sport Team Phoenix	157	
2020	(Netherlands) Nicky Catsburg (United Kingdom) Alexander Sims (United Kingdom) Nick Yelloly	BMW M6 GT3	(Germany) Rowe Racing	85	Race red-flagged after 7 hours 4 minutes due to heavy rain and fog, then suspended overnight for nearly 10 hours. First BMW victory in a decade. Philipp Eng was an entered driver but did not complete the required 2 laps.
2021	(Italy) Matteo Cairoli (Denmark) Michael Christensen (France) Kévin Estre	Porsche 911 GT3 R	(Germany) Manthey Racing	59	Less than 10 hours of racing due to heavy rain followed by overnight fog. 7th overall victory for Manthey. Lars Kern was an entered driver but did not complete the required 2 laps.
2022	(Netherlands) Robin Frijns (South Africa) Kelvin van der Linde (Belgium) Dries Vanthoor (Belgium) Frédéric Vervisch	Audi R8 LMS Evo II	(Germany) Audi Sport Team Phoenix	159	Sixth win for Audi.
2023	(New Zealand) Earl Bamber (Netherlands) Nicky Catsburg (Germany) Felipe Fernández Laser (United Kingdom) David Pittard	Ferrari 296 GT3	(Germany) Frikadelli Racing Team	162	First ever victory for Ferrari. New distance record.
2024	(Switzerland) Ricardo Feller (Germany) Dennis Marschall (Germany) Christopher Mies (Germany) Frank Stippler	Audi R8 LMS Evo II	(Germany) Scherer Sport PHX	50	New shortest distance record due to overnight fog resulting in 14-hour stoppage after 7 hours 23 minutes of racing. Race restarted for 5 formation laps and eventually waved off. 7th overall victory for Phoenix Racing, matching Manthey's record.
2025	(Brazil) Augusto Farfus (Finland) Jesse Krohn (Switzerland) Raffaele Marciello (South Africa) Kelvin van der Linde	BMW M4 GT3 Evo	(Germany) Rowe Racing	141	A record-extending twenty-first win for BMW. Race run under fully dry conditions. Race red-flagged for 2 hours on Saturday due to a power outage that affected the pit area. Race-long leader Manthey lost the win to a 100-second time penalty.
2026	(Germany) Maro Engel (Belgium) Maxime Martin (Germany) Fabian Schiller (Germany) Luca Stolz	Mercedes-AMG GT3 Evo	(United States) Mercedes-AMG Team Ravenol	156	Third win for Mercedes, and first since 2016.

== Records ==
=== Multiple overall wins by driver ===
Wins	Driver	Years
5	(Germany) Marcel Tiemann	2003, 2006, 2007, 2008, 2009
5	(Portugal) Pedro Lamy	2001, 2002, 2004, 2005, 2010
5	(Germany) Timo Bernhard	2006, 2007, 2008, 2009, 2011
4	(Germany) Fritz Müller	1976, 1977, 1978, 1981
4	(Belgium) Marc Duez	1992, 1995, 1998, 1999
4	(Germany) Peter Zakowski	1997, 1999, 2001, 2002
4	(France) Romain Dumas	2007, 2008, 2009, 2011
4	(Germany) Marc Lieb	2007, 2008, 2009, 2011
3	(Germany) Herbert Hechler	1976, 1977, 1978
3	(Germany) Klaus Ludwig	1982, 1987, 1999
3	(Germany) Hans-Joachim Stuck	1970, 1998, 2004
3	(Germany) Markus Winkelhock	2012, 2014, 2017
3	(Germany) Christopher Mies	2015, 2017, 2024
3	(Germany) Frank Stippler	2012, 2019, 2024
3	(South Africa) Kelvin van der Linde	2017, 2022, 2025
2	(Austria) Gerold Pankl	1971, 1972
2	(Germany) Dieter Gartmann	1981, 1982
2	(Germany) Axel Felder	1984, 1985
2	(Germany) Winfried Vogt	1979, 1986
2	(Germany) Klaus Niedzwiedz	1982, 1987
2	(Germany) Joachim Winkelhock	1990, 1991
2	(Germany) Frank Katthöfer	1993, 1994
2	(Italy) Roberto Ravaglia	1989, 1995
2	(Germany) Johannes Scheid	1996, 1997
2	(Germany) Sabine Reck	1996, 1997
2	(Germany) Hans-Jürgen Tiemann	1997, 1999
2	(Germany) Altfrid Heger	1990, 2000
2	(Germany) Michael Bartels	2000, 2001
2	(Germany) Uwe Alzen	2000, 2010
2	(Germany) Jörg Müller	2004, 2010
2	(Germany) Lucas Luhr	2006, 2011
2	(Germany) Christopher Haase	2012, 2014
2	(Germany) Bernd Schneider	2013, 2016
2	(Belgium) Dries Vanthoor	2019, 2022
2	(Belgium) Frédéric Vervisch	2019, 2022
2	(Netherlands) Nicky Catsburg	2020, 2023
2	(Brazil) Augusto Farfus	2010, 2025
2	(Germany) Maro Engel	2016, 2026

=== Multiple overall wins by team ===
Wins	Team	Years
7	(Germany) Phoenix Racing	2000, 2003, 2012, 2014, 2019, 2022, 2024
7	(Germany) Manthey Racing	2006, 2007, 2008, 2009, 2011, 2018, 2021
5	(Germany) Schnitzer Motorsport	1991, 1998, 2004, 2005, 2010
3	(Germany) Alpina	1971, 1972, 1973
3	(Germany) Auto Budde Team	1984, 1985, 1986
3	(Italy) Team Bigazzi	1989, 1992, 1995
3	(Germany) Zakspeed	1999, 2001, 2002
2	(Germany) Scheid Motorsport	1996, 1997
2	(Germany) Black Falcon	2013, 2016
2	(Germany) Rowe Racing	2020, 2025

=== Overall wins by manufacturer ===
Wins	Manufacturer	Years
21	(Germany) BMW	1970, 1971, 1972, 1973, 1984, 1985, 1986, 1989, 1990, 1991, 1992, 1994, 1995, 1996, 1997, 1998, 2004, 2005, 2010, 2020, 2025
13	(Germany) Porsche	1976, 1977, 1978, 1988, 1993, 2000, 2006, 2007, 2008, 2009, 2011, 2018, 2021
7	(Germany) Audi	2012, 2014, 2015, 2017, 2019, 2022, 2024
5	(United States) Ford	1979, 1980, 1981, 1982, 1987
3	(United States) Chrysler	1999, 2001, 2002
3	(Germany) Mercedes	2013, 2016, 2026
1	(Germany) Opel	2003
1	(Italy) Ferrari	2023

== See also ==
- List of Nordschleife lap times (racing)
- Nürburgring Langstrecken-Serie
- Rundstrecken Challenge Nürburgring

== Bibliography ==
- Müller, Wilfried; Ufer, Jörg (1 May 2013). 24h Nürburgring – Die Geschichte der ersten 40 Rennen [24h Nürburgring – The History of the First 40 Races] (in German). Duisburg: McKlein Publishing. p. 336. ISBN 978-3-927458-62-8.
