= Robert d'Arista =

American artist and educator (1929–1987)

- Born: 1929; New York, New York
- Died: October 11, 1987 (aged 57–58); Ashland, Massachusetts
- Alma mater: Art Students League of New York, New York University, and Columbia University
- Known for: Painting, Educator
- Spouse: Jane Webb d'Arista
- Website: robertdarista.com

Robert d'Arista (1929–1987) was an American artist and educator.

== Biography ==
d'Arista was born in New York City in 1929. He studied at the Art Students League of New York, New York University, and Columbia University, and received a Fulbright Grant/Fellowship to study painting in Italy.

Later, he taught at American University in Washington DC from 1961 through 1984, and then at Boston University from 1985 until his death in 1987.

d'Arista died in Ashland, Massachusetts on October 11, 1987.

== Exhibits ==
d'Arista exhibited at the Art Institute of Chicago, the Carnegie International, the Pennsylvania Academy of the Fine Arts, and the Whitney Museum of American Art. His work is in the collections of the Detroit Institute of Arts, The Guggenheim, the Toledo Museum of Art, and Yale University as well as the Smithsonian American Art Museum and the Hirshhorn Museum.

In 2018 the American University Museum held a retrospective of his work.
