= Robert Wilberforce (cricketer) =

Australian cricketer

Personal information
- Born: 3 July 1910; Perth, Western Australia
- Died: 10 October 1987 (aged 77); Perth, Western Australia
- Batting: Right-handed
- Bowling: Right arm Medium
- Source: Cricinfo, 26 September 2017

Robert Wilberforce (31 July 1910 – 10 October 1987) was an Australian cricketer. He played ten first-class matches for Western Australia between 1926/27 and 1937/38.
