= Racing flags =

Flags used to communicate with racecar drivers

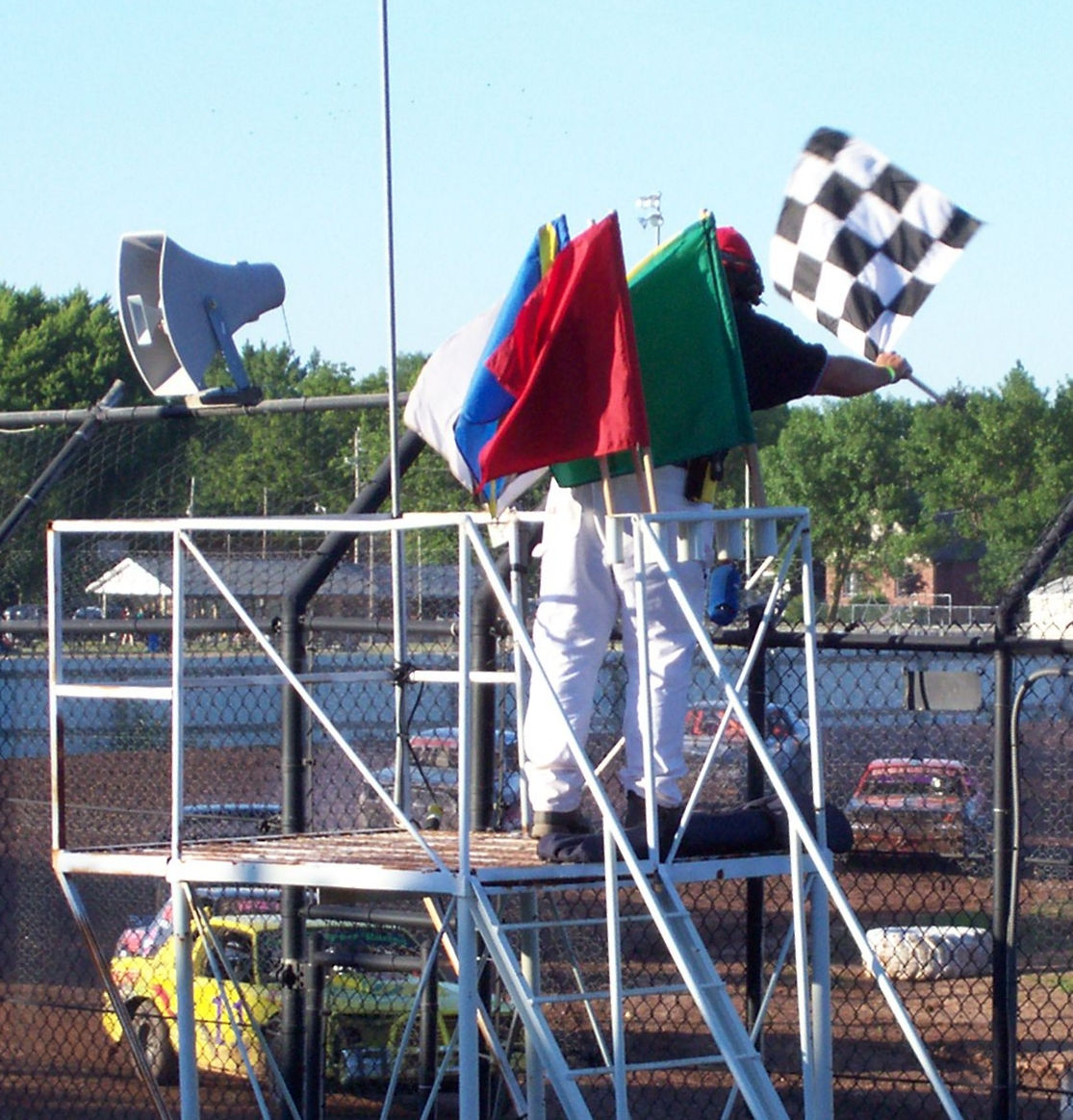
The flagman displaying the chequered flag with a complete set of stockcar racing flags

Racing flags are traditionally used in auto racing and similar motorsports to indicate track conditions and to communicate important messages to drivers. Typically, the starter, sometimes the grand marshal of a race, waves the flags atop a flag stand near the start-finish line. Track marshals are also stationed at observation posts along the race track in order to communicate both local and course-wide conditions to drivers. Alternatively, some race tracks employ lights to supplement the primary flag at the start-finish line.

== Summary ==
While there is no universal system of racing flags across all of motorsports, most series have standardized them, with some flags carrying over between series. For example, the chequered flag is commonly used across all of motorsport to signify the end of a session (practice, qualifying, or race), while the penalty flags differ from series to series. FIA-sanctioned championship flags are the most commonly used internationally as they cover championships such as Formula 1, the FIA World Endurance Championship and WTCC, and are adopted (and sometimes adapted) by many more motorsport governing bodies across the world such as, for example, the MSA.

Uses of flags in major racing leagues
Flag	Names	Summary				
Flag	Names	FIA-sanctioned races	FIM-sanctioned races	IndyCar	NASCAR	Supercars
	Green	Start of race End of caution Pit lane open				Ready to start race End of caution period End of caution section
	Green				Race starting or restarting under caution	
	Yellow; Caution				Race starting or restarting under caution	
	Yellow; Caution	Hazard on or near the track Hazard blocking the track Safety car deployed	Hazard on or near the track Hazard blocking the track	Caution/Road course local caution Road course full-course caution	Caution (no local caution in NASCAR, even on road courses)	Hazard on or near the track Safety car deployed
	Code 60	No overtaking, slow down to 60 km/h (37 mph)				
	Surface	Debris or fluid on track (road courses only)				
	Blue; Courtesy; Passing	Faster vehicles approaching			Faster cars approaching Hazard ahead on road course	Faster vehicles approaching; must allow car to lap
	White	Slow moving vehicle ahead	Wet race declared Riders can change bikes	Final lap		Slow moving vehicle ahead
	Red	Session suspended				
	Red				End of practice or qualifying	
	Black				End of practice or qualifying	
	Black	Disqualification; Mechanical problem Unsportsmanlike conduct	Return to the pits Mechanical problem	Return to the pits Disqualification		Pit lane drive through penalty Mechanical problem Unsportsmanlike conduct
	Checkered; Chequered	End of session			End of race End of racing stage	End of session
	National flag	Start of race (if starting lights not available)				Start of race (if starting lights not available)

== Status flags ==
Status flags are used to inform all drivers of the general status of the course during a race. In addition, the green, yellow, and red flags described below may be augmented or replaced by lights at various points around the circuit.

=== Green flag ===
The green flag signals a clear track to race on and the start of the race.

The solid green flag is usually displayed by the starter to indicate the start of a race. During a race, it is displayed at the end of a caution period or a temporary delay to indicate that the race is restarting. The waving of a green flag is almost universally supplemented with the illumination of green lights (resembling traffic lights) at various intervals around the course, particularly on ovals.

If the race is not under caution or delayed, it is said to be "under green-flag conditions". However, the flag itself is typically not continuously waved by the starter. No flag displayed at the starter's stand implies safe, green-flag conditions. At all times, however, the green lights remain lit.

- When shown at a marshalling post, a green flag may indicate the end of a local yellow-flag zone.
- A separate green flag displayed at the entrance to the pit area indicate that the pits are open.
- In NASCAR, a green and yellow flag waved at the same time indicates that the race is being started or restarted under caution and laps are being counted. This is sometimes called a "running yellow" and usually occurs when a track is drying after a rain delay. The officials will utilize the cars in the field to facilitate the final drying of the course, but in order to not waste fuel (affecting fuel strategy, etc.), and delay the race further, the laps are counted towards the advertised race distance.
- In 1980, USAC flagman Duane Sweeney started a tradition at the Indianapolis 500 of waving twin green flags for added visual effect at the start of the race. Green flags waved at restarts were single.
- Since around the 1990s, some races on occasion invite celebrity guests to wave the green flag at the start of the race.
- Before the use of starting lights in Formula One and most other FIA sanctioned or associated events, the national flag of the country in which a race is occurring, instead of a green flag, was used to signal its start. This practice is retained on occasion in the event of equipment failure, or simply as a tradition, such as at the 24 Hours of Le Mans.
- In some series, the green flag is waved at the rear of the grid following the formation lap to indicate to the official controlling the race start that the final car has reached its starting position and the race can be started.

=== Yellow flag ===
The yellow flag means caution.

The solid yellow flag, or caution flag, universally requires drivers to slow down due to a hazard on the track, typically a crash, a stopped car, debris or light rain. However, the procedures for displaying the yellow flag vary for different racing styles and sanctioning bodies.

In Formula One racing, a yellow flag displayed at the starter's stand or a marshal station indicates that there is a hazard "downstream" of the station. The manner of display depends on the location of the hazard:

- A single waved flag denotes a hazard on the racing surface itself.
- A single stationary flag denotes a hazard near the racing surface.
- Two flags waved simultaneously denotes a hazard that wholly or partly blocks the racing surface (like an accident). This informs the driver that there may be marshals on the track and to prepare to stop, if necessary.

When shown at a station, drivers are forbidden from overtaking until either the hazard or the next flag station displaying a green flag (signifying the end of a cautionary section) is passed. This flag is shown at the discretion of the marshals manning the station.

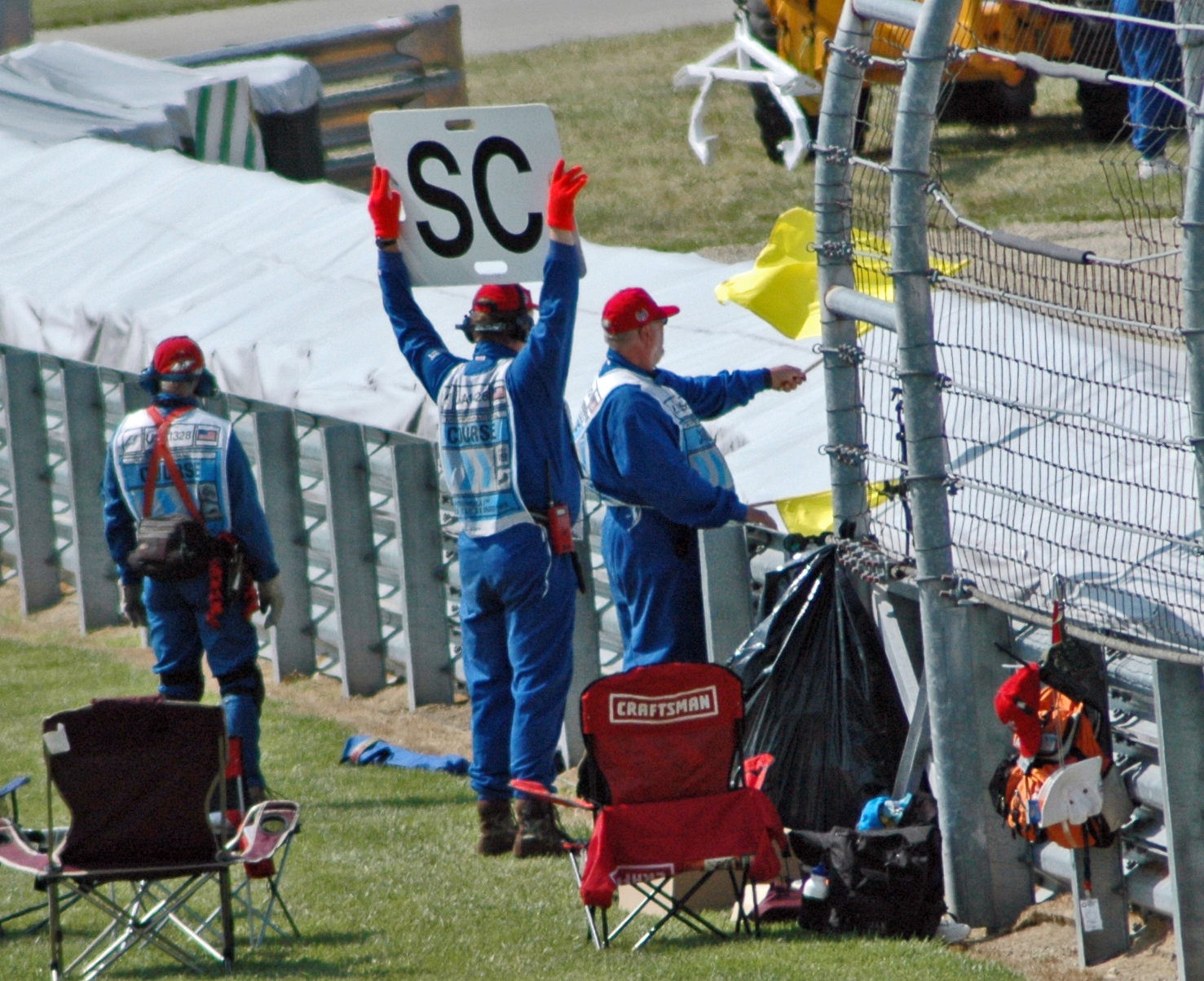
A yellow flag with SC (safety car) sign is shown during the 2005 United States Grand Prix.

When the safety car is on the circuit, all flag points will display a "safety car board" (a large white board with "SC" in large black lettering). When flag points are under radio control, this will happen immediately, otherwise, the board is displayed when the safety car comes round for the first time. This is accompanied by a waved yellow flag. Standard yellow flag conditions apply to the whole circuit; notably, overtaking is completely forbidden. When the safety car comes in and the race resumes, a green flag is displayed at the start line, and subsequently at all flag points around the circuit for one lap. Overtaking is not allowed until the cars have passed the start/finish line.

When there are circumstances where double-waved yellow flags are needed yet usage of the safety car is not warranted, then the race will be under a virtual safety car period, during which all flag points will display a "VSC board" and all light panels on track will display the letters VSC surrounded by a flashing yellow border. Under the VSC procedure, all drivers on the track must reduce their speed and stay above a minimum time set by race officials at least once in each marshalling sector. Overtaking is not permitted unless another driver enters the pit lane or if a car slows down due to an obvious problem. When deemed safe to end the VSC procedure, teams are notified via the official messaging system 10 to 15 seconds before green flags are waved.

In some systems, including UK (MSA) national regulations, if the hazard is secured (e.g. if a broken down car is parked safely away from the track, next to the barriers), the yellow flag(s) may be withdrawn and replaced with a fixed "hazard board" (A yellow triangle on a white background, containing a black exclamation mark) will be displayed for the remainder of the session. This ensures drivers who were in the pits while the hazard was being dealt with are warned of a minor hazard away from the track while allowing yellow flags to be re-displayed if a new hazard develops).

==== Full-course yellow ====
Most races in the FIA World Endurance Championship may be under a full-course yellow period upon discretion of the race director when deemed necessary for safety reasons. Once declared, all flag points will display an "FCY board" and all cars on track must immediately slow down to 80 km/h (50 mph) and maintain their distance to the cars in front and behind. Overtaking is forbidden until green flags are waved.

The FCY procedure was used during the 2019 24 Hours of Le Mans in response to Porsche's dominant GTE-Pro victory in 2018. Partial track "slow zones" are identified by track-side horizontal markings at both beginning and end, and "next slow" boards in the preceding zone. Within the zone, all marshal posts will display double-waved yellow flags and "slow" boards, and all light panels display the letters SZ surrounded by a flashing yellow border. All cars within the zone must slow down to 80 km/h until they are clear of the waved green flag at the end.

In Formula E, the FCY condition is used, but unlike any other racing series, the cars have an FCY speed limiter. When activated, the cars will slow down to 50 km/h (31 mph). Overtaking under the FCY condition is not allowed, and could result in a penalty. This happened at the 2019 Rome ePrix, when Jean Eric Vergne overtook future Techeetah teammate António Félix da Costa. As a result, Vergne was given a five-second time penalty. For the 2019–20 Formula E season, activating attack mode during FCY was disallowed. Additionally, for every minute under FCY, 1kWh of energy gets taken out of their energy allocation.

In both NASCAR and IndyCar, a single yellow flag waved from the starter's stand places the race under caution. At this time, a pace car will enter the course and lead the field at a safe, predetermined, reduced speed. On oval tracks, yellow lights universally supplement the primary flag at the start-finish line. These lights usually operate in a flashing manner, in order to quickly gain the attention of the drivers. The field is locked into place at the onset of caution periods and no one is allowed to pass another car without mutual consent (excluding crashed and immobile cars). In some races, though, cars may pass one another on pit road during a caution period. When the starter shows a furled yellow flag, it indicates one lap to green.

On road course races in IndyCar, a single yellow flag at a marshaling station indicates a "local" yellow, similar to the aforementioned rules in Formula One. In these cases, the pace car does not enter the track, and the caution period is limited only to that particular segment of the track. Green flag racing prevails around the remainder of the course. Twin yellow flags displayed at the starter's stand indicates a "full-course caution", in which the pace car would enter the track and the entire course would be under caution. This might occur for a serious crash or other major hazards. NASCAR has also experimented with "local yellows" on their road course events, although a plain blue flag is used instead.

In the case of snowmobile racing, the yellow flag is displayed at or before the point of the hazard. When a snowmobile racer crosses the yellow flag, the race will continue, however, the skis and track of the snowmobile must remain on the ground.

In snowmobile water cross (racing on open water), the caution flag simply warns the racers that one or more racers have sunk and are in the water, however the race will continue as normal.

In horse racing, the yellow flag means that there is a serious incident ahead, the horses must be pulled up and the race must be declared void. Most yellow flags are seen when a horse has suffered a serious injury.

==== Code 60 flag ====
The pink flag orders drivers to slow down to 60 km/h (37 mph) and to not overtake until a green flag is waved.

As an alternative to the full-course yellow and safety car periods used during other FIA-backed races, the 24H Series uses a series of purple lights and flags to declare a "Code 60" period. Under "Code 60", overtaking is not allowed and all drivers must slow their cars down to a maximum of 60 km/h (37 mph). The race resumes immediately when green flags are waved and green lights are flashing at each marshal post. Yellow flags are still used to indicate local cautions.

==== Racing to the caution ====
The point at which the caution period starts is a topic of controversy in oval racing. Traditionally, the cars were locked into their positions when they crossed the start-finish line, but technological advancements have made it possible to lock them in at the instant that the caution is declared. This has effectively put an end to the "race back to the caution", in which drivers speed up during yellow flag periods to beat the leader to the flag. This practice, while giving lapped drivers a better chance to make their lap back, was at times highly dangerous in that it encouraged drivers to engage in pitched battles with major safety hazards on track. Safety workers were not able to respond to accidents until the cars were under control of the pace car, which markedly slowed their response times to potentially injured drivers. To compensate for the elimination of the race back to the caution, NASCAR and some other motorsports series, both road racing and short oval, have implemented the free pass, which allows the highest-placed car that is a full lap or more behind the race leader to complete an extra lap during the caution period in order to make up a lap.

In some series (Indy Racing League, Champ Car, beginning in 2007, Formula One, and beginning in mid 2009, NASCAR) lapped cars between the pace car and the leader are allowed to move to the rear of the next lap when the signal is given two laps before a restart.

In Formula One, all lapped cars between the leaders are permitted to advance one lap.

The rule, as enforced in the three open-wheel series, is designed to prevent lapped cars from blocking on ensuing restarts, as to prevent unsportsmanlike blocking when a lapped teammate or friend of one driver attempts to help that driver through impeding the progress of an opponent on the restart.

=== Red and yellow striped flag ===
The "surface flag" indicates a slippery track surface ahead.

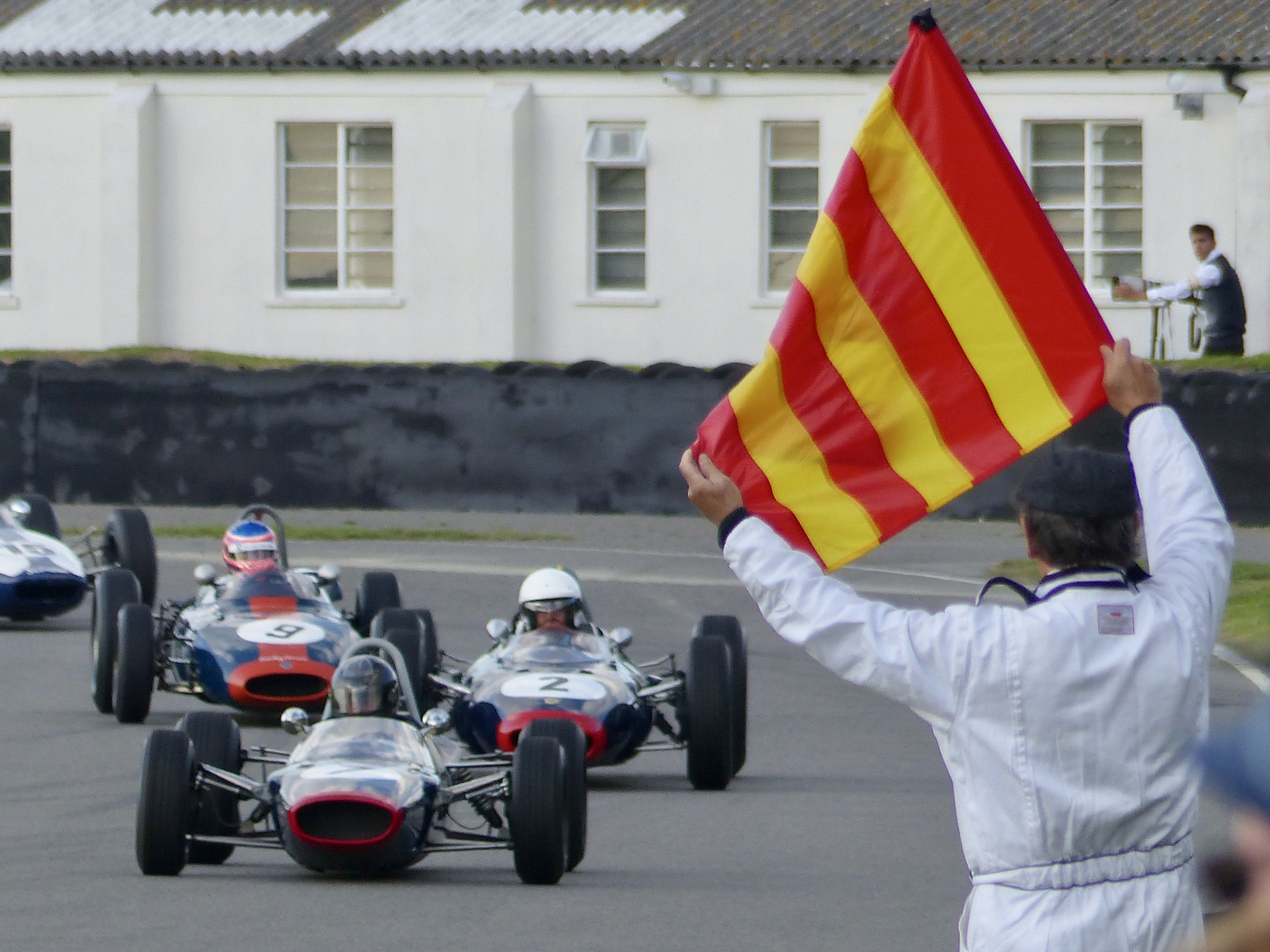
The red and yellow flag at the 2018 Goodwood Revival Meeting.

The red and yellow striped flag or surface flag (also sometimes referred to as "slippery surface," "change of surface," "surface hazard," flag and colloquially as the "oil" flag) is displayed stationary at local flag stations to indicate that track surface conditions have changed due to substances, or minor hazard on the track which could reduce grip or cause a car to lose control. Generally, fluids such as oil, coolant, and even localised water, or small pieces of debris or gravel are the hazards. Many organizations will display this flag for only two laps, after which the drivers should all be aware of the hazard, and changed surface is considered to merely be part of the track. This also allows the flag to be re-displayed if conditions change further.

=== Red flag ===
The red flag signals the suspension of the current session.

The solid red flag is displayed when conditions are too dangerous to continue the session. Depending on the series and the circumstances, the cars are typically directed to proceed immediately to pit road, or to stop at a specific spot on the track. In some severe cases the cars might be required to stop immediately where they are. During red flag conditions, repair work in the pits, the garage area, or on the track is typically prohibited, except in non-points paying races. Formula One is an exception to that general rule, as teams there are permitted to change tyres and perform repairs during a red flag, subject to limitations in the sporting regulations.

There are numerous hazards that might cause a need to halt or prematurely end a session. Many hazards, such as rain, lightning, darkness, a blocked course (due to debris, water, or safety vehicles), a car on fire, a severely demolished car (where parts are dropped on the track, like the engine), a serious accident where a driver was seriously injured or killed (only if death is officially announced) or a multi-car crash (especially one that results in serious injuries, extensive time to clean up or one that results in damage to walls, fences or the surface itself which require repairs) might prompt series officials to call for the red flag.

Some series use a red flag to temporarily stop a race nearing the end of a race after an accident or other incident to minimize the number of caution laps, even when the situation would not warrant a red flag at other points in the race. This is usually done when a collision requiring cleanup would otherwise extend the caution period to take longer than the amount of race laps available to finish the race, when a fuel spill occurs on the circuit, or to maximize safety team work. During such a red-flag period, cars are directed to stop in line at a specific point on the track, usually directly opposite to the incident. In Supercars, a race that is suspended after 75% of the laps have been completed may be declared complete at the race director's discretion, such as happened in Supercars forerunner Bathurst 1000 race in 1992 when torrential rain led to numerous cars crashing off the track in laps 144 and 145 and race results were woundback two laps.

The red flag may be used to indicate a pre-determined pause in the race, such as in NASCAR's Budweiser Shootout or the All-Star Race. In these cases, the cars are directed to the pit area where some may be worked on to the extent the race rules allow.

- In the event of a bad start, the yellow and red flags may be displayed together, or a unique diagonally divided red and yellow flag can be displayed, to indicate a restart. Drivers will go back to their starting positions and line up for another start. This is rarely used where computer scoring is involved, and can create much confusion as the drivers attempt to get back in order.
- In NASCAR, a practice session or a qualifying session is ended with the red and black flags waved together.

=== White flag ===
The white flag signals that a slow moving or course vehicle ahead in FIA-sanctioned races, or the start of the final lap in NASCAR and IndyCar.

In Formula One, the white flag is waved on the last corner and the pit straight at the end of free practice sessions on Friday and Saturday, indicating to drivers that there are drivers doing practice starts on the pit straight. Drivers are permitted to do one practice start at the end of each free practice session.

In all championships which use the FIA International Sporting Code, as well as North American road racing, the white flag indicates the presence of an officials car such as ambulance, fire truck, jet dryer, etc. or a competitor moving at below normal speed in the section of track covered by the flag station. In IndyCar, a stationary white flag means they are moving above one-third racing speed while waving means they are moving below one-third racing speed.

In most American forms of motorsports – including NASCAR, IndyCar, and North American motorcycle road racing – a waved white flag displayed at the starter's stand indicates the start of the final lap of the race.

In MotoGP, a white flag is used to inform riders that they are allowed to change machine. The race direction has deemed that the track is wet enough to justify the change of bikes and the Grand Prix becomes a wet race, having originally been declared a "dry race" at the start.

In some series, a white flag is shown from all flag stations on the first lap of a practice or qualifying session so competitors will know which stations are staffed.

=== National flag ===
Prior to the adoption of starting lights, the Supercars series and its forerunners used a green flag to start the race. Following the adoption of lights as the routine starting device, if the starting lights were unavailable a race was started by lowering the national flag of whichever country the race was held in.

== Instruction flags ==
Instruction flags are usually used to communicate with one driver at a time.

=== Black flag ===
The black flag indicates a driver is disqualified in an FIA-sanctioned race, or orders a driver to the pits in NASCAR and IndyCar.

The solid black flag is used to summon a driver to the pits. It is usually associated with a penalty imposed on the driver for disobeying the rules, but may also be used when a car is suffering a mechanical failure, leaking fluid, smoking excessively, exhibiting damage such as loose bodywork, loose hood, dragging bumper, or any other damage that could potentially become a hazard to the driver or other competitors. In some cases, the black flag may be used to call a driver to the pits when their radio is not working, though this is not common.

In FIA International-permitted series, the black flag means an immediate disqualification for the driver involved. The car number of the summoned driver is displayed on the finish line. Some sanctioning bodies wave the black flag at all observation posts simultaneously to order all drivers to clear the track after the starter waves the red flag, often in the case of a serious accident.

In Supercars races, infringements such as exceeding the pit lane speed limit, violating a restart after a safety car period, or causing an accident will result in a drive through pit penalty that must be taken in reasonable time. Rarely, due to the short amount of time in which the driver has to complete the penalty, such a penalty may be rescinded such as in race 28 of the 2021 season when, upon receiving a penalty for passing before the control line after a safety car period, Shane van Gisbergen protested over his radio that the lead driver had suddenly reduced throttle forcing van Gisbergen to pass, and throttle telemetry supported this. The sudden 42% reduction in throttle itself could have led to a drive through penalty for race leader Anton de Pasquale, but the very wet conditions and possible loss of traction and safety issues were mitigating circumstances.

When the black flag is used for disciplinary reasons in most races in North America, a driver is required to return to pit lane for at minimum a drive-through penalty. In cases of damage, the car must return to the pits and team is given an opportunity make repairs and get the car up to an acceptable condition, after which time it may rejoin the race. In either case, a driver being black-flagged is given a short window (typically 3–5 laps) to adhere. If the driver fails to serve the black flag and return to the pits within the required window, officials will cease scoring of that car. In rare cases when a disciplinary black flag comes very near the end of the race, and the race finishes before the serving window closes, officials may simply issue an alternative penalty, such as a 1-lap penalty. This happened to Michael Andretti at the 1994 Indianapolis 500.

A driver may be black-flagged for failing to maintain a reasonable minimum speed, even if no apparent damage or mechanical failure is present. If the driver still cannot maintain minimum speed in relation to the leaders after repairs, the driver may be required to park for the remainder of the race. For example, NASCAR requires that a driver run at or above 115 percent of the fastest lap time by any driver in the final practice. (This can be converted to an average speed-limit based on the length of the course, which for oval tracks will be close to the actual speed limit at any given time.) IndyCar has a 105 percent rule, most notably used when officials parked Jean Alesi and Simona de Silvestro during the 2012 Indianapolis 500. In one rare case, during the 1969 Canadian Grand Prix, Al Pease became the only driver disqualified from a Formula One race for going too slow.

In the case of snowmobile racing, the black flag comes in three stages to disqualification; the first flag is a warning to a racer, the second flag is a one-lap penalty, and the third is disqualification. In order for a snowmobile racer to receive a black flag, the racer must make contact with intent to inconvenience another racer.

==== Black flag with orange circle ====
This flag is used in FIA-sanctioned races to order a damaged car to the pits for repairs.

A mechanical black flag is a black flag with an orange disc in its center which indicates that a vehicle is being summoned to the pits due to serious mechanical problems or loose bodywork that presents a risk to other competitors. At some road racing events, it is used to summon the vehicle to the pits to inform the driver of violation "maximum sound levels". Also known as the "meatball" flag.

==== Per-bend black-white flag ====
This flag is used to indicate unsportsmanlike conduct in FIA-sanctioned races.

A diagonally divided black-and-white flag is displayed with a car number to indicate a warning for unsportsmanlike conduct. This flag can be displayed if a car tries to intentionally drive another car off the course, or if a driver gets out of their car and initiates an altercation with another driver. For example, Charles Leclerc was shown this flag for "bad sportsmanship" while defending from Lewis Hamilton during the 2019 Italian Grand Prix.

The black and white diagonal flag can also mean a warning to a driver for exceeding track limits. For example, in 2023 Austrian Grand Prix in Formula One which had multiple penalties handed out to drivers for exceeding track limits, the black and white flag was shown to drivers multiple times: on their third infringement the flag was shown, and then on the fourth and subsequent infringements time penalties were given.

Some administrators (NASCAR and IndyCar) do not distinguish mechanical problems or unsportsmanlike conduct from rules violations and simply use the solid black flag for all violations.

==== Black flag with white cross ====
In NASCAR and IndyCar, this flag indicates a driver is disqualified.

Some leagues use a black flag with a white saltire. This is displayed with a car number if a driver ignores the other black flags for an extended period and also it indicates that that car is no longer being scored. In NASCAR, the car is not scored again until it pays attention to the black flag by pitting once this flag is displayed. However, in IndyCar, they are no longer scored indefinitely (disqualified).

Ignoring the black flag or the black-white cross flag intentionally may result in post-race disciplinary action in addition to disqualification from the race. Fines, probation, suspensions, and other penalties (e.g., points being docked from championship standings) may result, depending upon the severity of the situation.

=== Blue flag ===
The solid blue flag orders or advises backmarkers (depending on sanctioning body) to give way to faster cars.

In NASCAR, this flag advises backmarkers to give way to faster cars.

A light blue flag, sometimes with a diagonal yellow, orange, or red stripe, informs a driver that a faster car is approaching and that the driver should move aside to allow one or more faster cars to pass. During a race, this would only be usually shown to a driver who is getting lapped but during practice or qualifying sessions, it could be shown to any driver. In most series, the blue flag is not mandatory—drivers obey it only as a courtesy to their fellow racers. As such, it is often referred to as the "courtesy flag". In other series, drivers get severely penalized for not yielding or for interfering with the leaders, including getting sent to the pits for the rest of the race. In Formula One, if the driver about to be lapped ignores three waved blue flags in a row, he is required to serve a drive-through penalty. The blue flag may also be used to warn a driver that another car on the same lap is going to attempt to overtake them.

The steady blue flag is displayed when a faster car is approaching, the blue flag is waved when the faster car is about to overtake.

Not all racing series use blue flags, for example they are not used in rally or rallycross.

In Formula One, blue lights or flags may be shown at the end of pit lanes to warn of approaching cars on the track.

== Chequered flag ==
A typical chequered flag design

The chequered flag (or checkered flag) is displayed at the start-finish line to indicate that the race is officially finished. At some circuits, the first flag point will display a repeat chequered flag (usually on the opposite side of the circuit). The flag is commonly associated with the winner of a race, as they are the first driver to "take" (in other words, drive past) the chequered flag.

Upon seeing the chequered flag and crossing the finish line, drivers are required to slow to a safe speed, and return to their garage, parc fermé, or paddock, depending on the applicable regulations of the series.

=== Design of the chequered flag ===
There is no standard design for the chequered flag. Although it nearly always consists of alternating black and white squares or rectangles arranged in a chequerboard pattern, the number, size, and length-width proportions of the rectangles vary from one flag to another. Also, the chequered flag typically has a black rectangle at the corner of the flag closest to the top of the flagpole. There have been instances of the black and white squares being painted onto a wooden board and simply held up for drivers to observe at the finish line. Sometimes a sponsor's logo is emblazoned in the center of the chequered flag. In NASCAR and F1 events, a single chequered flag is waved to signal the completion of a race. In IndyCar, two chequered flags are waved together, a tradition dating to the 1980 Indianapolis 500, but only if the race is under green conditions. (The starter will wave both a chequered and yellow flag if safety car conditions occur at the end of the race, in a yellow-chequer finish.)

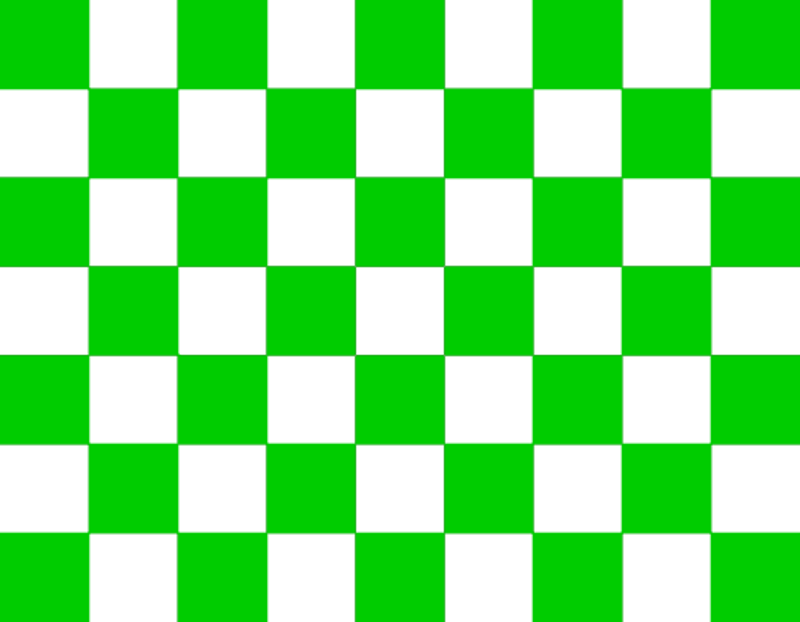
NASCAR green and white checkered flag for stages

NASCAR traditionally has a special version of the chequered flag sewn for Victory Lane that has the name and date of the race on it, a practice that has spread to IndyCar. That flag is used for the team in the winner's photographs taken after the race, and is a prize awarded to the team along with the race trophy. Teams often hang such flags at their headquarters in a similar fashion to other sports teams hanging championship banners from the rafters at stadiums.

Beginning in the 2017 season, NASCAR has utilized a white-and-green variant of the chequered flag to indicate the end of a stage of a race. After the flag is waved, the race temporarily goes into caution to allow all drivers the option to pit and take service. Drivers listed in the top 10 at the time this flag is waved are awarded championship points.

=== Origins of the chequered flag ===
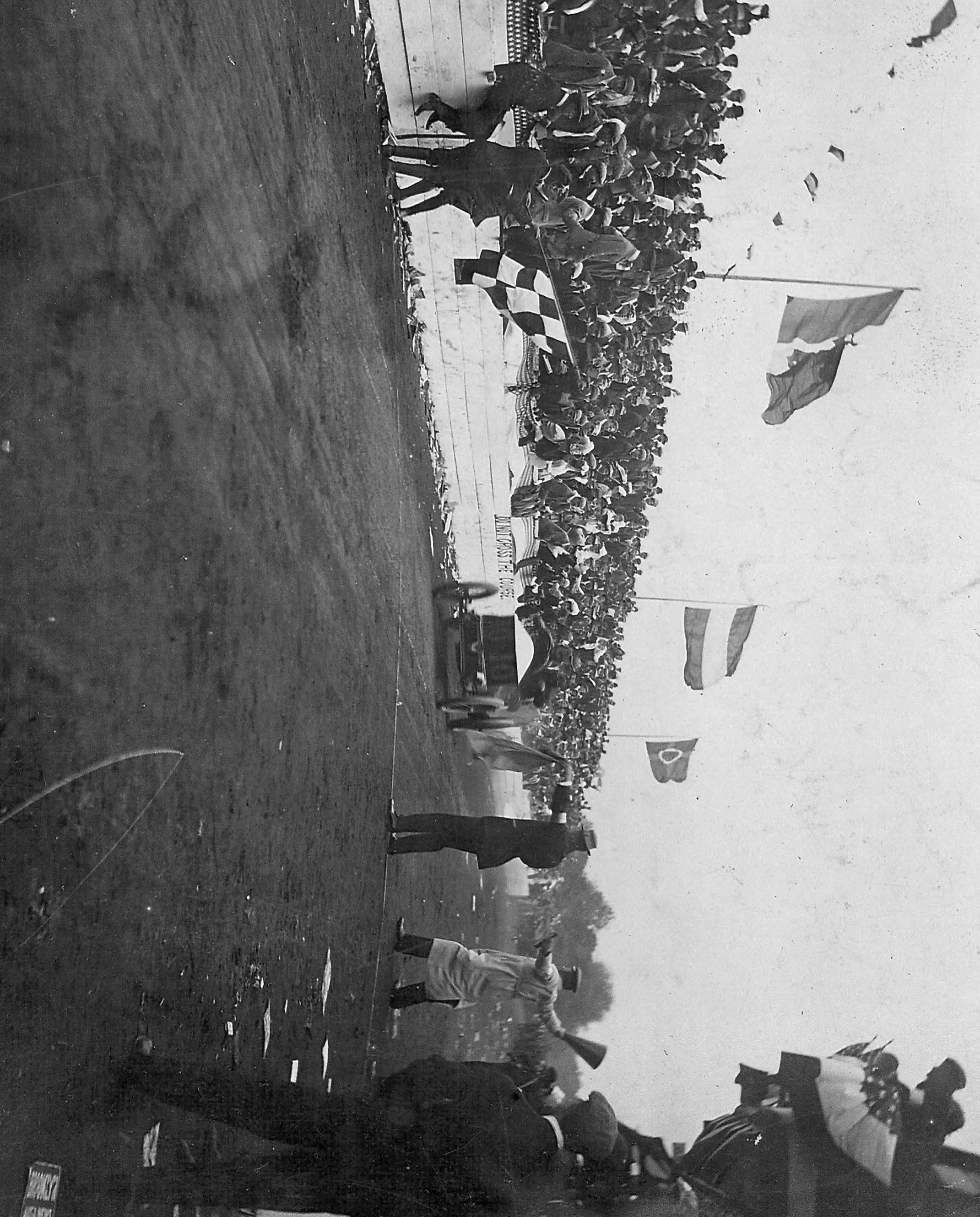
A chequered flag being used at the end of the 1906 Vanderbilt Cup

The chequered flag originated at the Glidden Tours, a road rally, in 1906. Sidney Walden divided the courses into sections; the time check at the end of each section was performed by race officials called "checkers". These checkers used chequered flags to identify themselves. The earliest known photographic record of a chequered flag being used to end a race was from the 1906 Vanderbilt Cup race held in Long Island, New York.

There is a persistent urban legend claiming that the flag originated in horse racing, but there is no basis for this myth. Another myth claims that the chequered flag's earliest known use was for 19th century bicycle races in France, but this claim also has no evidence.

In 1980, USAC starter Duane Sweeney started a tradition at the Indianapolis 500 by waving twin chequered flags at the end of the race. Previous starters had only used a single flag. Sweeney also marked the first use of twin green flags at the start of the race.

=== Celebrating a win with the chequered flag ===
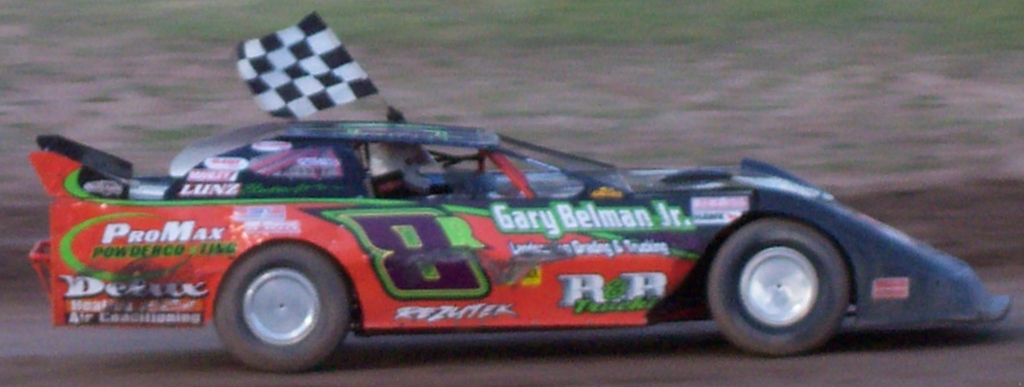
Late model stock car driver celebrates with a chequered flag.

In snowmobile skipping, the chequered flag is attached to the racer's life vest, and the racer is rewarded with a victory lap.

At many short tracks, the flagman gives the chequered flag to the winner of the race, but a variety of other celebratory traditions, such as the burnout, the Polish victory lap and the victory lane or victory circle celebration, sometimes overshadow the chequered flag tradition.

=== Use outside auto racing ===
The chequered flag has become so well recognized that it is often used to indicate the conclusion of many things unrelated to auto racing. For example, some software installation programs display a chequered flag to indicate that a computer program has been installed successfully.

Chequered flags were also posted at each corner of the end zones in the original Yankee Stadium when the facility was used by the New York Giants of the National Football League from 1956 through 1973.

The chequered flag is not only used for auto racing, but also for a representation of the automotive industry itself.

== Flags in motorcycle racing ==
Flag indicating an emergency vehicle in motorcycle racing

The chequered, red, yellow, white, and green flags are used identically to how they are used in auto racing. The yellow and red striped flag is used to indicate debris on the track. Other flags used include:

- A white flag with couped red cross, to indicate medical attention is required near the marshalling post. Can also mean an ambulance is on the course (generally a red cross is followed by the race being "red flagged")
- A white flag with a saltire red cross indicates precipitation and is used instead of the yellow-red striped slippery surface flag in rain conditions only.
- A black flag with white border, indicating that a rider must leave the course.
- A dark, rather than light blue flag, indicating that a faster motorcycle is approaching.
- A white flag with a black "V", to indicate poor visibility ahead. Used at the Isle of Man TT festival.
- A white flag displaying the letters "SUN" in black block capitals, to indicate glare from the sun ahead. Used at the Isle of Man TT festival.

== Practicality of racing flags ==
Historically, the only means for race officials to communicate to drivers was through the usage of flags. With the advent of two-way or full-duplex radios, this is not necessarily the case. Most drivers racing on paved short track oval courses do not rely on flags; rather, they are informed of track conditions by their crew chiefs and spotters or by yellow and red flashing lights found on most oval tracks. Occasionally, though, some drivers must rely on the use of flags for information when they experience radio malfunctions. Flags are still used to tell the crowd of spectators what is happening. Dirt track and lower-level racers are less likely to have radios than their paved track counterparts.

In contrast to smaller circuits, road racing drivers rely heavily on the use of flags. As it is impractical to have spotters covering all segments of a winding race track, the first indication to drivers of local hazards almost always comes from marshals stationed at various flag stations around the course. Missing or disregarding a flag can have critical consequences, as Mario and Michael Andretti discovered during a 1991 CART race in Detroit, Michigan. Michael came around a blind corner at high speed, without heeding the yellow flag being displayed—and plowed into the back of a CART safety truck tending to another disabled car. Fifteen seconds later, his father Mario disregarded the same madly waving yellows and crashed into the car the safety vehicle was trying to assist.

Modern F1 cars and other high-end formula racing cars have information displays on their steering wheels which can flash up the word flag to warn drivers when they are entering a sector with a local yellow. Most new circuits and older ones used for F1 employ trackside flashing lights at regular intervals, as a clearer way to signal yellow, green, red, blue or SC flag status to drivers than relying on them to spot a marshal waving a flag, especially so on modern circuits where there are large run-off areas which put the marshals well away from the actual track.
