= Zdzisław Wojdylak =

Polish field hockey player

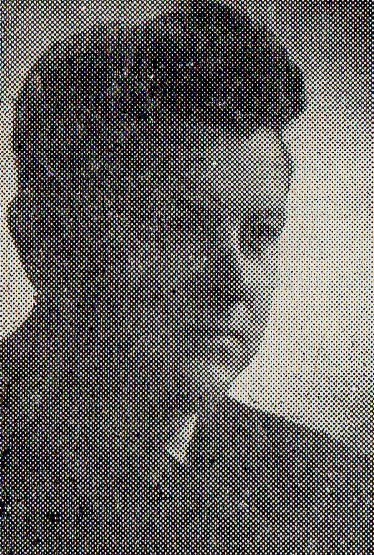
- Zdzisław Wojdylak in 1987.

Personal information
- Nationality: Polish
- Born: 3 October 1929 Inowrocław, Poland
- Died: 26 October 1987 (aged 58) Poznań, Poland

Sport
- Sport: Field hockey

Zdzisław Wojdylak (3 October 1929 – 26 October 1987) was a Polish field hockey player. He competed at the 1952 Summer Olympics and the 1960 Summer Olympics.
