= Igor Chernat =

Soviet serial killer

- Born: c. 1966; Odessa, UkSSR, Soviet Union
- Died: 21 October 1987 (aged 20–21); Leningrad, RSFSR, Soviet Union
- Cause of death: Execution by shooting
- Other names: "The Evil Spirit of Kaukjarvi" "The Kamensky Maniac"
- Conviction: Murder
- Penalty: Death

Details
- Victims: 4–13
- Span of crimes: 1985–1986
- Country: Soviet Union
- State: Leningrad
- Date apprehended: September 1986

Igor Chernat (Russian: И́горь Черна́т; c. 1966 – 21 October 1987), known as The Evil Spirit of Kaukjarvi (Russian: Злой дух Каукъярви), was a Soviet serial killer who killed at least 4 women between 1985 and 1986.

== Biography ==
Very little is known about the life of Igor Chernat before his murders. It is known that he was born in Odessa, and that he studied at the Velikodolinskaya Secondary School Nmb. 1 in the Odessa Oblast. After graduating from 8th grade, he entered a vocational school. He lived on Pionerskoy Street, and studied as a driver in the DOSAAF. In 1985, he was drafted into the ranks of the Soviet Army, where he served as an IFV driver. He served in the village of Kamenka, as part of the 138th Guards Motor Rifle Brigade.

== Murders ==
Chernat committed his first murder in November 1985, which he admitted only after his arrest.

In March 1986, the maniac went hunting again. His second victim was Yevgeniya Nazarova, who had come to visit her soldier husband, who was at that time in the medical unit's infirmary. Chernat led the girl from the checkpoint and raped her, then killed her with a fishing line.

In mid-April 1986, Chernat committed his third murder. The victim this time was Viktoria Bykovskaya, the mother of one of the soldiers, who was bringing food to her son in the military unit.

Soon after, the maniac committed his fourth murder. The victim was, again, the wife of one of the soldiers, Elena Ivanova. However, this time the pair were observed by a Pvt. Zhevolyuk, who reported how he saw the victim on the day of the murder with a soldier, heading to the nearest forest.

Chernat sold everything that he stole from his victims in the market of Vyborg.

== Investigation and trial ==
Large-scale inspections began in all military units in Kamenka, as a result of which monstrous facts were revealed about the situation there: desertion, theft, dedovshchina, etc.

During the inspection, one of the soldiers suspected of stealing military property said that Chernat had stolen most and nothing would happen to him. The accused was interrogated but escaped that same night. He moved back to Odessa, where he tried to make new documents for himself, but he realized that it would fail. And then Chernat went to the police, where he stated that he was the maniac responsible for the murders. He was transported to Leningrad, where he soon began to testify.

The military tribunal of the Leningrad Military District sentenced Igor Chernat to an exceptional measure of punishment, the death penalty through firing squad. In October 1987, the sentence was carried out.

== See also ==
- List of Russian serial killers
- List of serial killers by number of victims
