= Theodore Brameld =

American philosopher (1904–1987)

Theodore Brameld (20 January 1904 – 18 October 1987) was an American philosopher and educator who supported the educational philosophy of social reconstructionism. His philosophy originated in 1928 when he enrolled as a doctoral student at the University of Chicago in the field of philosophy where he trained under the progressive philosopher and politician, T.V. Smith. After becoming intrigued by John Dewey’s philosophy of education, Brameld developed his own theory of schools being the ultimate source to bring about political and social change.

== Life ==
=== Early life ===
Theodore Burghard Hurt Brameld was born in Neillsville, Wisconsin in 1904. After graduating from Neillsville High School in 1922, he went on to Ripon College where he received his AB degree in English in 1926. Brameld graduated in 1931 when he completed his dissertation, A Philosophic Approach to Communism, which was eventually published in 1933 and set the standard for the rest of his life's work.

== Marxism ==
Brameld was a prominent supporter of the Soviet Union and often wrote articles on the relationship between teaching and "social change". Like most in the "progressive" education movement, his objectives were the indoctrination of students in overthrowing the American capitalist system. In an article in the leftist journal "The Social Frontier" in 1936, Brameld wrote an article called "Karl Marx And The American Teacher" in which he outlined the many subtle ways a teacher could influence his students into collectivist thinking. Brameld was also a frequent contributor to the pro Stalin journal "Science and Society".

=== Life after receiving doctorate ===
Upon completing his doctorate in 1931, he spent much of his time teaching at various places of higher learning. He first taught at Long Island University (1931–1935) and Adelphi College (1935–1939) in New York. He then continued on to the University of Minnesota (1939–1947), New York University (1947–1958), and Boston University (1958–1969). Throughout his years of teaching, he continued to research his Reconstructionist ideas by implementing them into a school setting at Floodwood High School in Minnesota. In this project, he worked with administrators to develop an educational program for the juniors and seniors which involved learning by critical thinking. He tried to convince the students and teachers that controversial issues and problems must play a huge role in education. No issue was considered off-limits for students to discuss and analyze. He was completely okay with posing his argument both inside and outside the classroom.

During his long career as a philosopher and educator, Brameld held lectures in the United States and across the globe. He became the author of more than a dozen books having to do with his philosophy of reconstructionism. In 1945, he wrote Minority Problems in the Public Schools which confronted social unfairness like prejudice, discrimination, and economic exploitation in schools. Continuing on his philosophy, he published Patterns of Educational Philosophy: A Democratic Interpretation in 1950 that helped cultivate his view of four philosophies of education: essentialism, perennialism, progressivism, and reconstructionism. He decided that of the four philosophies, reconstructionism was the philosophy responding best to the time period.

Between 1957 and 1968, Brameld wrote three books including; Cultural Foundations of Education: An Interdisciplinary Exploration (1957), The Remaking of a Culture (1959), and Japan: Culture, Education, and Change in Two Communities (1968). Cultural Foundations of Education: An Interdisciplinary Exploration told of the debt he owed to anthropologists who influenced his philosophy. The Remaking of a Culture and Japan: Culture, Education, and Change in Two Communities both explained instances where his philosophy of reconstructionism had been applied. One of Brameld’s later books, The Teacher As World Citizen: A Scenario of the 21st Century (1976), summarizes his hopes and dreams in a different way. The narrator in this book tells his or her views from the year 2001 looking into the past and recalling all of the educational changes that have taken place.

=== Later life ===
Towards the end of Theodore Brameld’s life, he became professor emeritus at Boston University, but continued to teach at Springfield College in Massachusetts and at the University of Hawaii where he continued to spread the word about his theory of reconstructionism. As he had done for most professional life, he kept on writing letters to the editors of newspapers working on articles for journals until his death in October 1987 in Durham, North Carolina. He was eighty-three.

== Reconstructionism ==
=== Brameld's views ===
Brameld’s philosophy of education was called reconstructionism. He was not the first to come up with this idea, but he was one of the first to support it publicly. In response to the existing crisis of the time period, he believed reconstructionism in schools was the solution to the problem. In his book, Education as Power, he clearly outlines the two major roles of reconstructionism.

“Education has two major roles: to transmit culture and to modify culture. When American culture is in a state of crisis, the second of these roles–that of modifying and innovating–becomes more important. Reconstructionism, Brameld affirmed, is a crisis philosophy; the reconstructionist is "very clear as to which road mankind should take, but he [or she] is not at all clear as to which road it will take".

With this philosophy of reconstructionism, his main focus was to create a school system with democracy where controversial topics play a huge role. Students are expected use their mind and ask questions when this philosophy is in use. He wanted students to realize that values are not unchanging, they must be tested continuously by evidence. He was one of the signers of the Humanist Manifesto.

== Works ==
- Minority Problems in Public Schools (1945)
- Ends and Means in Education: A Midcentury Appraisal (1950)
- Patterns of Educational Philosophy: A Democratic Interpretation (1950)
- Philosophies of Education in Cultural Perspective (1955)
- Toward a Reconstructed Philosophy of Education (1956)
- Cultural Foundations of Education: An Interdisciplinary Exploration (1957)
- The Remaking of a Culture: Life and Education in Puerto Rico (1959)
- Education as Power (1965)
- The Use of Explosive Ideas in Education: Culture, Class, and Evolution (1965)
- Japan: Culture, Education, and Change in Two Communities (1968)
- The Climactic Decades (1970)
- The Teacher As World Citizen: A Scenario of the 21st Century (1976)
- Tourism as Cultural Learning (1977)
