= Tasman Knight =

Australian rules footballer

Personal information
- Full name: Tasman Roy Knight
- Born: 20 November 1906
- Died: 22 October 1987 (aged 80)
- Original team: Seymour
- Position: Full Back

Playing career^{1}
| Years | Club | Games (Goals) |
| 1930 | South Melbourne | 4 (0) |
- ^{1} Playing statistics correct to the end of 1930.

Tasman Knight (20 November 1906 – 22 October 1987) was an Australian rules footballer from Seymour, who played with South Melbourne in the Victorian Football League (VFL).
