= Ted Wildie =

Australian rules footballer

Personal information
- Full name: Edwin Wildie
- Born: 30 January 1906
- Died: 14 October 1987 (aged 81)
- Original team: Port CYMS (CYMSFA)
- Position: Defender

Playing career^{1}
Years	Club	Games (Goals)
1929	South Melbourne	11 (0)
- ^{1} Playing statistics correct to the end of 1929.

Edwin "Ted" Wildie (30 January 1906 – 14 October 1987) was an Australian rules footballer who played with South Melbourne in the Victorian Football League (VFL).

== Career ==
Wildie was a locally recruited player, from CYMS Football Association club Port CYMS. Beginning in the South Melbourne second eighteen, Wildie played a VFL seconds grand final in 1927, which South Melbourne lost to Carlton.

In the 1929 VFL season he got his opportunity when he came into the side for South Melbourne's round eight fixture. A defender, he showed promise on debut and remained in the team for the remainder of the season, for a total of 11 games. He was described as having a great dash from the back pocket.

The following year he found himself back in the South Melbourne seconds and didn't feature again in the seniors.
