= Axel Felder =

German race car driver

- Born: August 16, 1949 Wuppertal, West Germany
- Died: October 15, 1987 (aged 38) Monte Crezzo, Italy

Deutsche Tourenwagen Meisterschaft
- Years active: 1984-1985; 1987
- Teams: RG Bergisch Gladbach; Auto Budde Team; Ford Ringshausen Motorsport
- Starts: 7
- Wins: 0
- Poles: 0
- Fastest laps: 0
- Best finish: 38th in 1987

Previous series
- 1984; 1986-1987 1985 1978-1985: European Touring Car Championship; World Sportscar Championship; Nürburgring 24 Hours

Championship titles
- 1985 1984: Nürburgring 24 Hours; Nürburgring 24 Hours

Axel Felder (16 August 1949 – 15 October 1987) was a German racing driver who is best known for being a two-time winner of the Nürburgring 24 Hours endurance race. In 1985, he finished both 1st and 2nd in the race, completing stints in both BMW's during the event. Felder was killed in a plane crash in 1987.

== Career ==
Felder began racing in the Nürburgring 24h race in 1978. His greatest successes at the Nürburgring would come in 1984 where he won his first race alongside Franz-Josef Bohling and Peter Oberndorfer in a BMW 635CSi run by Auto Budde Racing Team. In 1985, Felder won the race again in the BMW this time alongside Jurgen Hamelmann and Robert Walterscheid-Muller. As he completed stints in both the winning car and second placed BMW, Felder took home two trophies and was classified in the top-two positions. Felder was recognised on BMW's 50th anniversary livery used in the 2020 race.

Also in 1984, Felder moved into Touring Cars. With his Nürburgring 24h winning team in European Touring Car Championship, competing in ten races. For 1985, he competed in one race of the World Sportscar Championship in a BMW M1 for Helmut Gall. He also completed one race of the DTM season scoring four points. In 1986, Felder competed in seven European Touring Car Championship races scoring 18 points. By 1987, he returned to DTM this time with Ford Ringshausen Motorsport and their Sierra XR4Ti. He completed two races, scoring one point and was classified 38th in the Championship.

== Death ==
On 15 October 1987, Felder was a passenger on Aero Trasporti Italiani Flight 460 which was a scheduled flight from Milan Linate to Köln. The ATR-42 plane crashed into Mount Crozza, Conca di Crezzo, Italy. Felder, along with all passengers and crew were killed in the accident.
