= Ted Shiels =

Australian rules footballer, born 1908

Personal information
- Full name: Edward James Shiels
- Born: 25 June 1908; Mirboo North, Victoria
- Died: 9 October 1987 (aged 79); Castlemaine, Victoria
- Original team: Mirboo North
- Height: 179 cm (5 ft 10 in)

Playing career^{1}
Years	Club	Games (Goals)
1929	Fitzroy	3 (0)
- ^{1} Playing statistics correct to the end of 1929.

Edward James Shiels (25 June 1908 – 9 October 1987) was an Australian rules footballer who played with Fitzroy in the Victorian Football League (VFL).

After three games with Fitzroy in the second half on the 1929 VFL season, in 1930 Shiels accepted a position as coach of Ararat Football Club for the 1930 season.
