= Neville Cohen =

English cricketer

Personal information
- Full name: Aaron Neville Cohen
- Born: 11 September 1913; Calcutta, Bengal, British India
- Died: 4 October 1987 (aged 74); Oxford, Oxfordshire, England
- Batting: Right-handed
- Bowling: Leg break

Domestic team information
- Years: Team
- 1934: Oxford University

Career statistics
Competition	First-class
Matches	3
Runs scored	27
Batting average	27.00
100s/50s	–/–
Top score	15*
Balls bowled	453
Wickets	4
Bowling average	67.25
5 wickets in innings	–
10 wickets in match	–
Best bowling	2/79
Catches/stumpings	2/–
- Source: ESPNcricinfo, 29 May 2020

Aaron Neville Cohen (11 September 1913 – 4 October 1987) was an English first-class cricketer and colonial official.

Cohen was born in British India at Calcutta in September 1913. He was educated in England at Cheltenham College, before going up to Lincoln College, Oxford. While studying at Oxford, he made three appearances in first-class cricket for Oxford University against Worcestershire, a combined Minor Counties cricket team and Leicestershire, all played at Oxford in 1934. He scored 27 runs in his three matches, with a high score of 15 not out. With his leg break bowling, he took 4 wickets at an average of 67.25 and with best figures of 2 for 79.

After graduating from Oxford, he joined the British Colonial Civil Service in British West Africa. He was commissioned as a second lieutenant during the Second World War in the African Colonial Forces. Cohen died at Oxford in October 1987.
