= Dick Wittmann =

Australian rules footballer, born 1901

Personal information
- Full name: Frederick Richard Wittmann
- Born: 3 February 1901; Clifton Hill, Victoria
- Died: 8 October 1987 (aged 86); Terrigal, New South Wales
- Original team: Carlton District
- Height: 171 cm (5 ft 7 in)
- Weight: 69 kg (152 lb)

Playing career^{1}
Years	Club	Games (Goals)
1920–21	Carlton	12 (13)
- ^{1} Playing statistics correct to the end of 1921.

Frederick Richard Wittmann (3 February 1901 – 8 October 1987) was an Australian rules footballer who played with Carlton in the Victorian Football League (VFL).
