= Len McConnell =

Australian rules footballer, born 1907

Personal information
- Full name: Leonard Frederick McConnell
- Born: 1 September 1907; Sale, Victoria
- Died: 23 October 1987 (aged 80); Bairnsdale, Victoria
- Original team: Warrnambool

Playing career^{1}
| Years | Club | Games (Goals) |
| 1928 | North Melbourne | 16 (5) |
- ^{1} Playing statistics correct to the end of 1928.

Leonard Frederick McConnell (1 September 1907 – 23 October 1987) was an Australian rules footballer who played with North Melbourne in the Victorian Football League (VFL).

McConnell later served as an instructor of recruits in the Australian Army during World War II.
