= Albert Western =

Australian rules footballer

Personal information
- Full name: Albert Western
- Born: 13 February 1923; Northam, Western Australia
- Died: 21 October 1987 (aged 64); Hamilton Hill, Western Australia
- Original team: South Fremantle
- Height: 178 cm (5 ft 10 in)
- Weight: 89 kg (196 lb)

Playing career^{1}
Years	Club	Games (Goals)
1941	East Fremantle	2 (1)
1947–51	South Fremantle	102 (153)
1952	Richmond	4 (3)
- ^{1} Playing statistics correct to the end of 1952.

Albert Western (13 February 1923 – 21 October 1987) was an Australian rules footballer who played for the Richmond Football Club in the Victorian Football League (VFL).

Western's football career was interrupted by his service in the Australian Army during World War II.
