= Robin Kreyer =

English cricketer and military officer

Personal information
- Full name: Robin Grey Kreyer
- Born: 17 April 1910; Multan, Punjab, British India
- Died: 16 October 1987 (aged 77); Barton Mills, Suffolk, England
- Batting: Unknown
- Bowling: Unknown

Domestic team information
- Years: Team
- 1931: Oxfordshire

Career statistics
| Competition | First-class |
|---|---|
| Matches | 1 |
| Runs scored | 2 |
| Batting average | 1.00 |
| 100s/50s | –/– |
| Top score | 2 |
| Balls bowled | 90 |
| Wickets | 1 |
| Bowling average | 74.00 |
| 5 wickets in innings | – |
| 10 wickets in match | – |
| Best bowling | 1/74 |
| Catches/stumpings | –/– |
- Source: Cricinfo, 25 June 2019

Robin Grey Kreyer DSO (17 April 1910 – 16 October 1987) was an English first-class cricketer and an officer in both the British Army and the British Indian Army.

== Military career and cricket ==
Kreyer was born at Multan in British India in April 1910, the eldest son of Colonel J. A. C. Kreyer, D.S.O., Indian Army. He was educated in England at Sherborne School and University College, Oxford.

After completing his education in England, Kreyer was commissioned into the Supplementary Reserve of Officers in the British Army as a second lieutenant with the Royal Tank Corps in September 1930. The following year he played minor counties cricket for Oxfordshire, making a single appearance in the Minor Counties Championship. He transferred to the British Indian Army in September 1932, with promotion to the rank of the rank of lieutenant coming November 1933. He was appointed to the 1st Battalion, 12th Frontier Force Regiment on 15 November 1933. He was mentioned in dispatches ‘for distinguished services in connection with the operations in Waziristan, North West Frontier of India, 16 September to 15 December 1937’, while attached to the 5th Battalion, (Queen Victoria's Own Corps of Guides) 12th Frontier Force Regiment.

He played a single first-class cricket match for the British Indian Army cricket team against Northern India in the 1934–35 Ranji Trophy at Lahore. Batting twice in the match, he was dismissed without scoring in the Army first-innings by Khadim Hussain, while in their second-innings he was dismissed for 2 runs by Ahmed Khan. He took one wicket in the match, that of George Abell, taking match figures of 1 for 74.

During the Second World War, Kreyer resigned his commission with the British Indian Army in May 1940 and returned to England. He enlisted in the ranks of the British Army and held the appointment of lance corporal, before being recommissioned as a lieutenant in February 1941 in the Royal Warwickshire Regiment. By June 1944 he held the rank of captain. He took part in the Normandy Landings, during which he was awarded the Distinguished Service Order in recognition of gallantry shown on 7 June, when the 2nd Royal Warwickshire's attacked Lébisey. He was wounded shortly after, but rejoined his unit in July 1944. He left the Warwickshire's in March 1945 to command a battalion in the Cheshire Regiment. He left the army as a Major after the war and went into farming. He died in October 1987 at Barton Mills, Suffolk.
