= Vallancey Brown =

Australian cricketer

Personal information
- Born: 7 December 1912; Sydney, Australia
- Died: 24 October 1987 (aged 74); Melbourne, Australia

Domestic team information
- Years: Team
- 1935: Victoria
- Source: Cricinfo, 22 November 2015

Vallancey Brown (7 December 1912 – 24 October 1987) was an Australian cricketer. He played one first-class cricket match for Victoria in 1935.

== See also ==
- List of Victoria first-class cricketers
