= List of Nordschleife lap times (racing) =

The Nürburgring Nordschleife is a motor racing circuit in Germany. Its over 20.8 km (12.9 mi) long old section dating from 1927, was truncated in 1982 as international championships had started to boycott the track after 1976. The adjacent modern Nürburgring Grand Prix track was opened in 1984. The two tracks can host events independently, or they can be combined, e.g. for the 24 Hours Nürburgring. As a result, lap times have been set in racing events on numerous Nordschleife track variants ranging from less than the shortest 20.832 km (12.9 mi) to the current maximum of nearly 26 km (16.2 mi).

An even longer approx. 28 km (17.4 mi) combined track that included the 7.7 km (4.8 mi) Südschleife was seldom used for major races since the 1930s. This shorter southern circuit was not modernized in the 1970s and was sacrificed for the 1980s construction of the modern track, as were the old pit facilities, the Südkehre (southern turn) and the straight behind the pits which were used in an original Nordschleife lap.

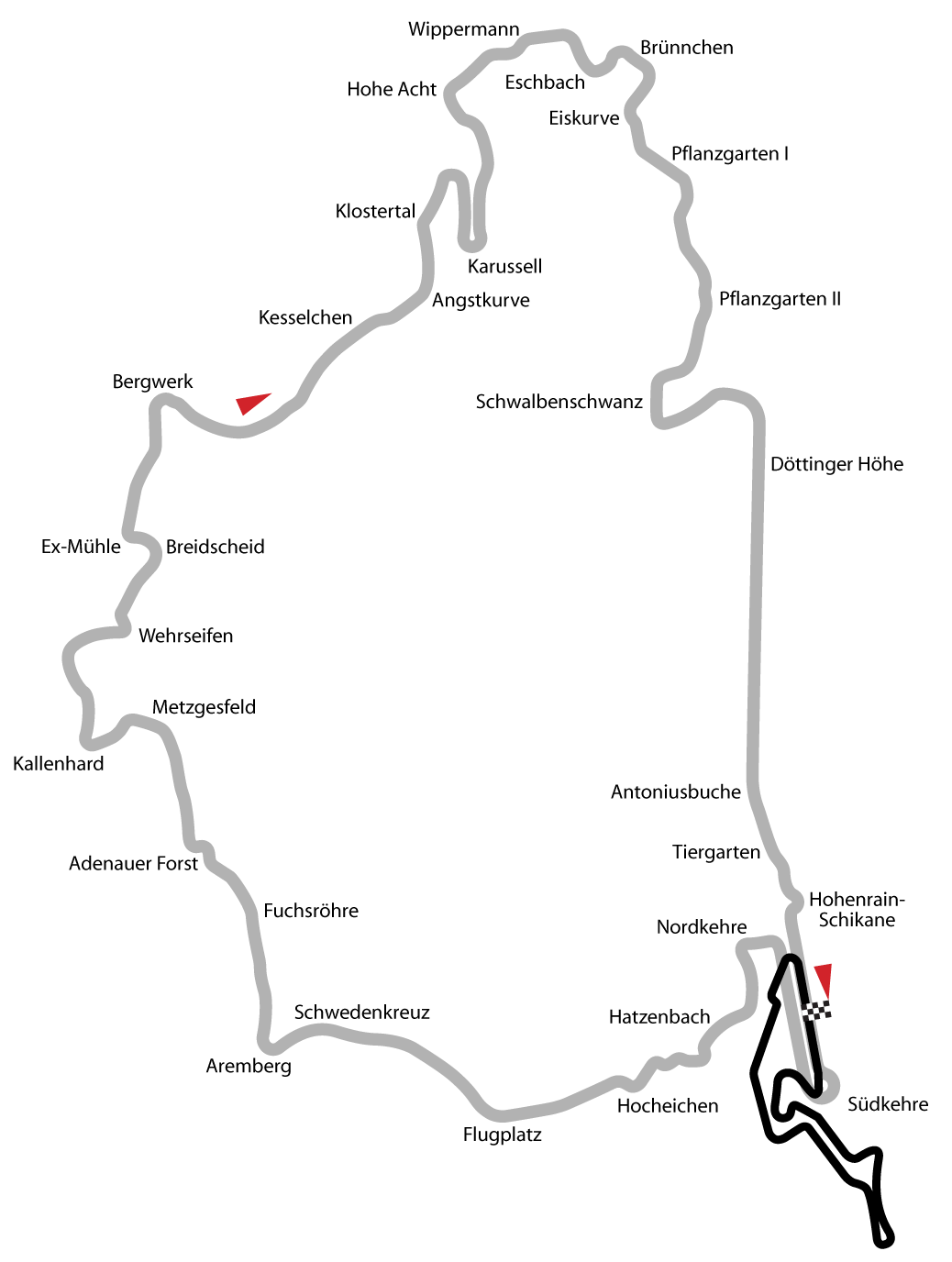
Grey: Nordschleife original 1967-1982 layout, 22835m Black: modern GP track (layout since 2002, ca. 5km)

== 1927-1939 Original track ==
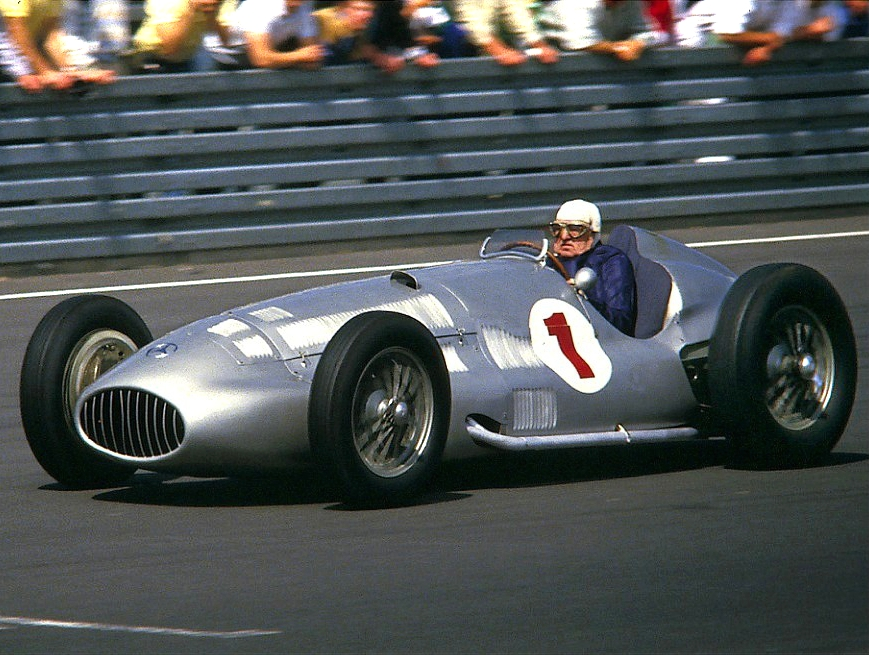
Almost half a century after setting the pre-war lap records, the Mercedes-Benz W154 is being demonstrated in 1986 by Hermann Lang.

The track was inaugurated in 1927 with the Eifelrennen events for bikes and cars, taking place on the combined Nordschleife and Südschleife, with a length of 28.265 km (17.563 mi). On the unfamiliar track, the best motorcyclists achieved an average race speed of about 90 km/h (55.9 mph). The best driver was Rudolf Caracciola in the big Mercedes S, at an average of 96.5 km/h (60.0 mph). In the three German Grand Prix that were contested there in the late 1920s, 18 laps resp. 508 km (315.7 mi) distance had to be covered. The cars of the time managed that in just under five hours, with an average of just over 110 km/h (68.4 mph), with lap times not under 15 minutes. The Eifelrennen events soon moved to the much shorter Südschleife.

After the 1930 German GP (and again the 1933 round) had been cancelled due to the great depression, major racing resumed with the 1931 German Grand Prix which from now on took place only on the Nordschleife. Its track length of 22.810 km (14.173 mi) remained unchanged until 1966. The track surface was altered and improved, with the ditch inside the Karussell being altered to a concrete banking as drivers like Caracciola used to put their inside wheels in there for extra grip. Also, the Nürburgring in the Eifel mountains became notorious for frequent bad weather, and due to its length with lap times of 10 minutes, conditions could change significantly in the meantime. Probably due to this, it took four years between Nuvolari beating the 11 minutes barrier in 1932, and Rosemeyer breaking the 10 minutes in the 1936 GP after several pilots came close in practice.

The speeds rose from 115 to 140 km/h (71.5 to 87.0 mph) in 1937, at the peak of the unlimited capacity era with 600 hp Silver Arrows like the Mercedes-Benz W125. From 1938 on, rules limited the capacity to 3 litres supercharged, but 480 hp and better handling equalized the disadvantage. Smaller Voiturettes with 1500cc were favored by the Non-Germans, and Mercedes had already built their W165 which proved able to win in this class, too. The new rules were expected to take effect in 1941, but the war changed the rules even more drastically.

Date	Time	km/h	Car	Driver	Event	Notes
19 July 1931	11:48.0		Bugatti T51	Achille Varzi	1931 German Grand Prix	Fastest lap
29 May 1932	11:42.8	116.81	Alfa Romeo Monza	Rudolf Caracciola	1932 Eifelrennen	Fastest lap (wet race?)
17 July 1932	10:49.4	126.45	Alfa Romeo Tipo B/P3	Tazio Nuvolari	1932 German Grand Prix	Fastest lap
28 May 1933		113.4	Alfa Romeo Monza	Tazio Nuvolari	1933 Eifelrennen	Average wet race speed
28 May 1934		122.5	Mercedes-Benz W25	Manfred von Brauchitsch	1934 Eifelrennen	Average race speed (wet race?)
15 July 1934	10:43.8		Auto Union Type A	Hans Stuck	1934 German Grand Prix	Fastest lap
14 June 1935	10:45.0		Mercedes-Benz W25	Manfred von Brauchitsch	1935 Eifelrennen	Quickest in practice day 1
16 June 1935	11:03.4		Mercedes-Benz W25	Rudolf Caracciola	1935 Eifelrennen	Fastest wet race lap
28 July 1935	10:32.0		Mercedes-Benz W25	Manfred von Brauchitsch	1935 German Grand Prix	Fastest lap, partially wet
14 June 1936	11:25.0	119.88	Auto Union Type C	Bernd Rosemeyer	1936 Eifelrennen	Fastest lap in fog and rain
25 July 1936	10:03.0		Mercedes-Benz W25K	Rudolf Caracciola	1936 German Grand Prix	Quickest in practice
26 July 1936	9:56.3	137.71	Auto Union Type C	Bernd Rosemeyer	1936 German Grand Prix	Fastest lap
12 June 1937	9:57.0	137.55	Auto Union Type C	Bernd Rosemeyer	1937 Eifelrennen	Pole
13 June 1937	9:58.8	137.13	Auto Union Type C	Bernd Rosemeyer	1937 Eifelrennen	Fastest lap
24 July 1937	9:46.2	140.08	Auto Union Type C	Bernd Rosemeyer	1937 German Grand Prix	Pole
25 July 1937	9:53.4	138.4	Auto Union Type C	Bernd Rosemeyer	1937 German Grand Prix	Fastest lap
23 July 1938	9:48.3	139.6	Mercedes-Benz W154	Manfred von Brauchitsch	1938 German Grand Prix	Pole
24 July 1938	10:09.1	134.82	Mercedes-Benz W154	Richard Seaman	1938 German Grand Prix	Fastest lap
20 May 1939	9:54.0	138.24	Mercedes-Benz W154	Hermann Lang	1939 Eifelrennen	Pole
21 May 1939	9:52.2	138.66	Mercedes-Benz W154	Hermann Lang	1939 Eifelrennen	Fastest lap
22 July 1939	9:43.1	140.8	Mercedes-Benz W154	Hermann Lang	1939 German Grand Prix	Pole
23 July 1939	10:24.2	131.6	Mercedes-Benz W154	Rudolf Caracciola	1939 German Grand Prix	Fastest lap, wet race

== 1951-1966 Classic Green Hell ==
The war and subsequent ill-treatment had damaged the track and the facilities. After 20 years, the track was now lined with tall hedges and trees, and thus was later baptized Green Hell. Smaller races resumed in the late forties, but Germans and Germany remained excluded from major sports events until 1951. The pre-war voiturette rule set for supercharged 1500cc engines (or 4500cc normal) had basically been made the Formula One in the 1940s.

In 1951, major international racing returned to the Ring, but even though the Alfas had also about 400 hp, they failed to eclipse the pre-war records set by Lang, who raced again for Mercedes in 1952 and 1954. Two rule changes brought less powerful machinery, and the Le Mans disaster in 1955 led to the cancellation of many GPs in that year, including the German. By 1956, the old records were finally beaten. Single seater open wheel Grand Prix cars soon came close to 9 minutes and 150 km/h. Also, sports car events emerged in the 1950s, as did touring car racing in the 1960s. The Ring saw two more years without F1 races, as Berlin's AVUS had been chosen for 1959, and in 1960, the German Grand Prix was run on the Südschleife to F2 rules which would become F1 rules in 1961. After three years of progress, including a revival of the mid-engine layout pioneered by Auto Union, the 9 minutes barrier was easily beaten despite small 1500cc engines with less than 200 hp, similar to the power of cars three decades earlier.

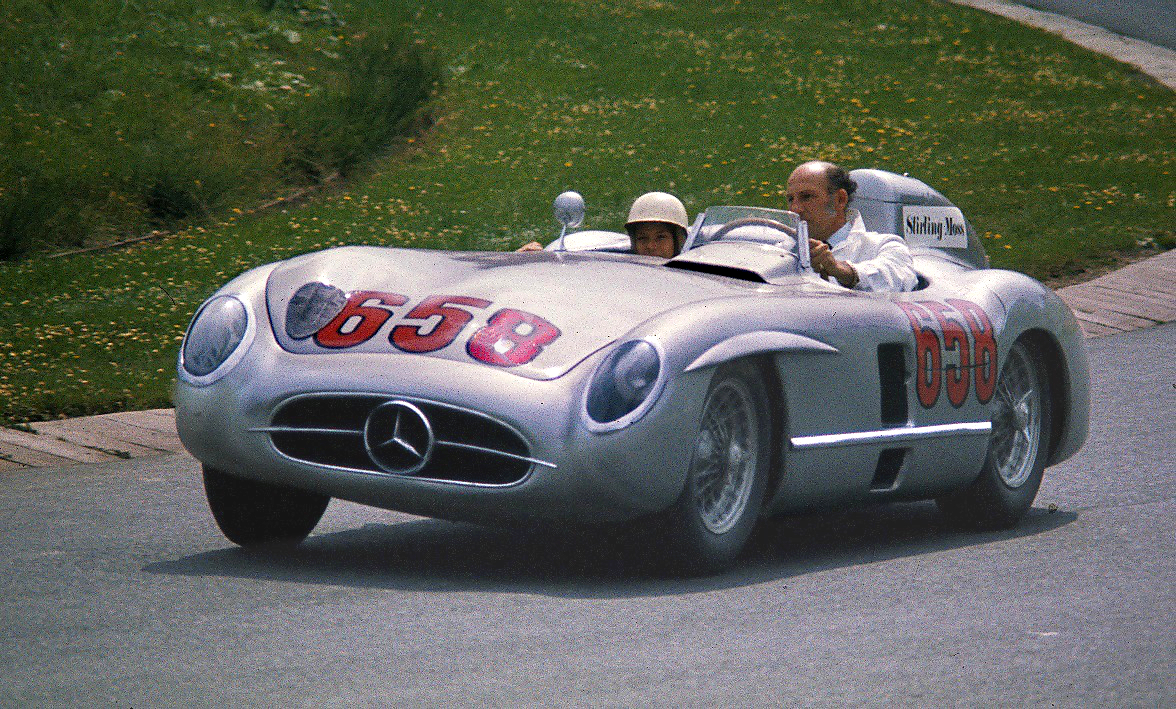
Stirling Moss, Mercedes-Benz 300 SLR, 1977

Date	Time	km/h	Car	Driver	Event	Notes
28 July 1951	9:55.8	137.9	Ferrari 375	Alberto Ascari	1951 German Grand Prix	Pole
29 July 1951	9:55.8	137.9	Alfa Romeo 158/159 Alfetta	Juan Manuel Fangio	1951 German Grand Prix	Fastest lap
3 August 1952	10:26.3	131.5	Mercedes-Benz W194 Spyder	Hermann Lang	1952 German Grand Prix sport car race	Fastest lap
3 August 1952	10:05.1	135.7	Ferrari 500	Alberto Ascari	1952 German Grand Prix (Formula 2 cars)	Fastest lap
2 August 1953	9:56.0	137.8	Ferrari 500	Alberto Ascari	1953 German Grand Prix (Formula 2 cars)	Fastest lap
30 August 1953	10:23.0	131.75	Lancia D24	Robert Manzon	1953 1000 km Nürburgring	Pole & fastest lap
21 July 1954	9:50.1		Mercedes-Benz W196	Juan Manuel Fangio	1954 German Grand Prix	Pole
1 August 1954	9:55.1	138.9	Mercedes-Benz W196	Karl Kling	1954 German Grand Prix	Fastest lap
28 May 1955	10:00.1		Mercedes-Benz 300 SLR	Juan Manuel Fangio	1955 Eifelrennen	Pole
29 May 1955	10:10.8	134.8	Mercedes-Benz 300 SLR	Stirling Moss	1955 Eifelrennen	Fastest lap
27 May 1956	10:05.3	135.662	Ferrari 860 Monza	Juan Manuel Fangio	1956 1000 km Nürburgring	Fastest lap
5 August 1956	9:41.6	141.2	Ferrari D50	Juan Manuel Fangio	1956 German Grand Prix	Fastest lap
4 August 1957	9:17.4	147.3	Maserati 250F	Juan Manuel Fangio	1957 German Grand Prix	Fastest lap
3 August 1958	9:09.2	149.5	Vanwall	Stirling Moss	1958 German Grand Prix	Fastest lap
6 June 1959	9:37.4		Ferrari 250 TR 59	Tony Brooks/Jean Behra	1959 1000 km Nürburgring	Pole
6 June 1959	9:40.5		Porsche 718 RSK 1.6	Wolfgang von Trips	1959 1000 km Nürburgring	2nd in qualifying
7 June 1959	9:32.0	143.559	Aston Martin DBR1	Stirling Moss	1959 1000 km Nürburgring	Fastest lap
21 May 1960	9:43.6		Porsche 718 RS 60	Jo Bonnier/Olivier Gendebien	1960 1000 km Nürburgring	Pole
22 May 1960	9:37.0	142.315	Maserati Tipo 61	Stirling Moss	1960 1000 km Nürburgring	Fastest lap
27 May 1961	9:33.7		Ferrari 246 SP	Wolfgang von Trips	1961 1000 km Nürburgring	Pole
28 May 1961	9:15.8	147.744	Ferrari 246 SP	Phil Hill	1961 1000 km Nürburgring	Fastest lap
5 August 1961	8:55.2		Ferrari 156	Phil Hill	1961 German Grand Prix	Pole
6 August 1961	8:57.8		Ferrari 156	Phil Hill	1961 German Grand Prix	Fastest lap
4 August 1962	8:47.2		Porsche 804	Dan Gurney	1962 German Grand Prix	Pole
5 August 1962	10:12.2	134.1	BRM P57	Graham Hill	1962 German Grand Prix	Fastest lap, wet race
4 August 1963	8:47.0	155.8	Ferrari 156	John Surtees	1963 German Grand Prix	Fastest lap
2 August 1964	8:39.0	158.2	Ferrari 158	John Surtees	1964 German Grand Prix	Fastest lap
1 August 1965	8:24.1	162.9	Lotus 33-Climax 1.5	Jim Clark	1965 German Grand Prix	Fastest lap
5 June 1966	8:37.0	158.8	Ferrari 330 P3	John Surtees	1966 1000 km Nürburgring	Fastest lap
6 August 1966	8:16.5		Lotus 33-Climax 2.0	Jim Clark	1966 German Grand Prix	Pole
7 August 1966	8:49.0	155.2	Cooper T81 Maserati	John Surtees	1966 German Grand Prix	Fastest lap, wet race

== 1967-1970 Chicane added ==
The Hohenrain chicane (and 25 meters extra, now 22.835 km (14.189 mi)) was added in early 1967 to lower entrance speed to the Start/Finish straight and the pitlane. Lap times were affected only initially, as technical progress, especially aerodynamic aids, made the cars significantly faster in the years to follow.

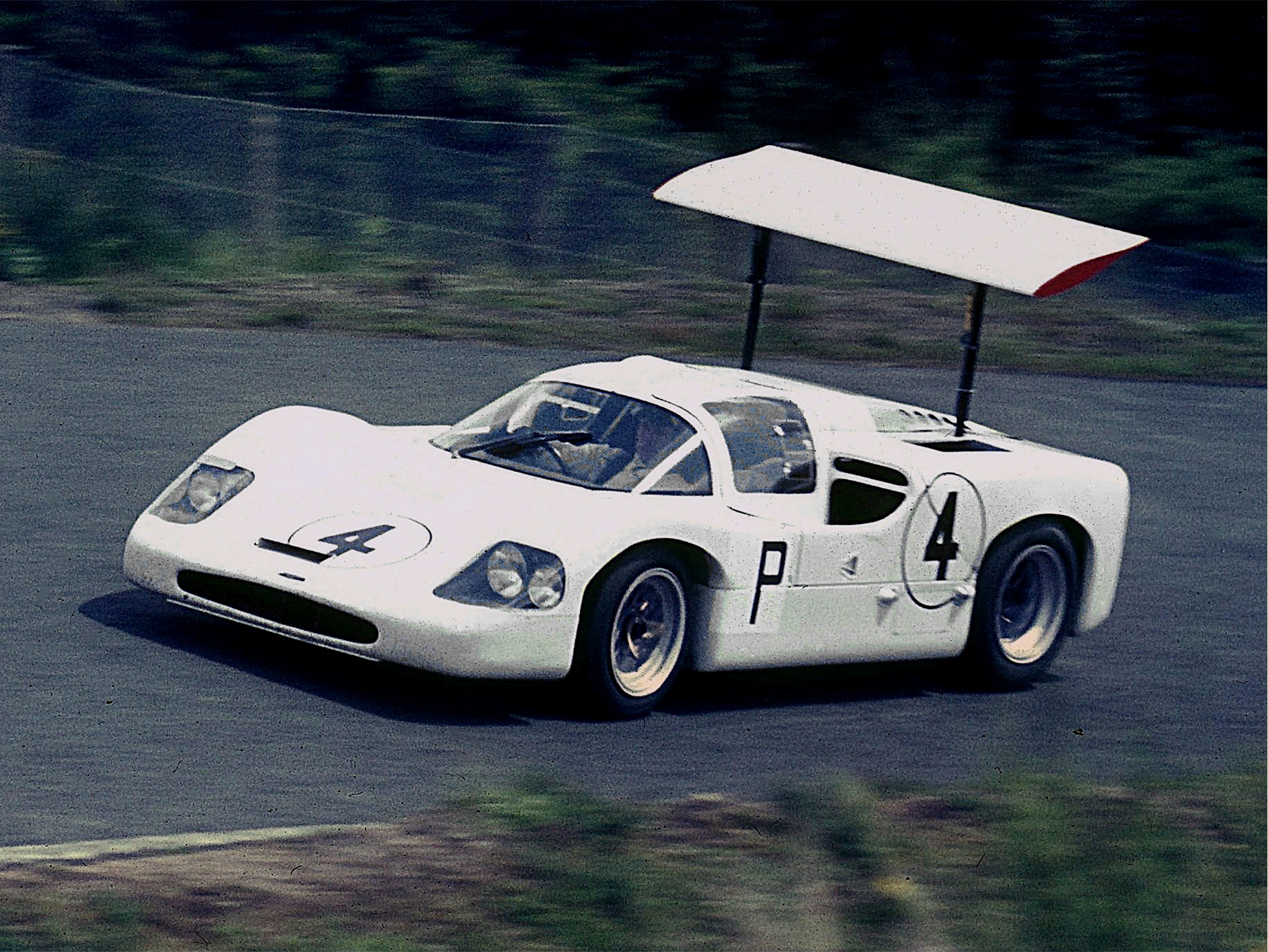
Mike Spence 1967 in the Chaparral 2F during practice at the Nürburgring

Date	Time	km/h	Car	Driver	Notes
27 May 1967	8:56.8	153.1	Porsche 910	Udo Schütz/Joe Buzzetta	1967 1000 km Nürburgring, pole
28 May 1967	8:42.1	157.5	Chaparral 2F	Phil Hill	1967 1000 km Nürburgring, fastest lap
5 August 1967	8:14.0	166.4	Matra MS5 - Cosworth FVA	Jacky Ickx	1967 German Grand Prix, F2 pole
5 August 1967	8:04.1	169.8	Lotus 49-Ford	Jim Clark	1967 German Grand Prix, pole
6 August 1967	8:21.8	163.8	Matra MS5 - Cosworth FVA	Jacky Ickx	1967 German Grand Prix, F2 fastest lap
6 August 1967	8:15.1	166.0	Eagle-Weslake	Dan Gurney	1967 German Grand Prix, fastest lap
18 May 1968	8:32.8	160.3	Porsche 907 2.2	Hans Herrmann/Rolf Stommelen	1968 1000 km Nürburgring, pole
19 May 1968	8:33.0	160.3	Porsche 908	Jo Siffert	1968 1000 km Nürburgring, fastest lap
July 1968	7:57.8	172.1	Ferrari 312	Chris Amon	1968 F1 Scuderia Ferrari Firestone tyre testing session
4 August 1968	9:36.0	142.7	Matra-Ford	Jackie Stewart	1968 German Grand Prix, fastest lap, in a wet race
27 April 1969	8:05.3	169.4	Matra MS7 - Cosworth FVA	Jackie Stewart	1969 Eifelrennen F2, fastest lap
31 May 1969	8:00.2	171.2	Porsche 908/02	Jo Siffert/Brian Redman	1969 1000 km Nürburgring, pole
1 June 1969	8:03.3	170.1	Ferrari 312P	Chris Amon	1969 1000 km Nürburgring, fastest lap
2 August 1969	8:11.1	167.4	Matra MS7 - Cosworth FVA	Johnny Servoz-Gavin	1969 German Grand Prix Formula 2, pole
2 August 1969	7:42.1	177.9	Brabham BT26A-Ford	Jacky Ickx	1969 German Grand Prix, pole
3 August 1969	8:12.4	166.9	Matra MS7 - Cosworth FVA	Johnny Servoz-Gavin	1969 German Grand Prix Formula 2, fastest lap
3 August 1969	7:43.8	177.2	Brabham BT26A-Ford	Jacky Ickx	1969 German Grand Prix, fastest lap
19 April 1970	9:04.8	150.9	McNamara-Ford	Helmut Marko	1970 Formula 3 ADAC 300 km Goodyear Pokal
30 May 1970	7:43.3	177.4	Porsche 908/03	Jo Siffert/Brian Redman	1970 1000 km Nürburgring, pole
31 May 1970	7:50.4	174.8	Porsche 908/03	Pedro Rodríguez	1970 1000 km Nürburgring, fastest lap
2 August 1970	8:14.5	166.1	Brabham BT30 - Cosworth FVA	Derek Bell	1970 Formula 2 Preis von Deutschland

Due to safety concerns, the Formula One drivers on short notice forced a move of the 1970 German Grand Prix to the Hockenheimring. To meet drivers demands, construction works at the Nürburgring started in fall of 1970. Despite the official track length remaining the same, this altered the character of the track and its surroundings significantly.

== 1971-1982 Rebuilt Nordschleife ==
By early 1971, the Nordschleife track had been resurfaced, several bumps and jumps (e. g. Brünnchen) had been removed, and the hedges had been replaced by Armco barriers. As a result, the track became even faster, with sportscars setting new track records before Formula One returned. The Südschleife was not updated and abandoned after 1971. Formula One held its last Grand Prix on the Nordschleife in 1976, the last Motorcycle Grand Prix there was in 1980. Due to aerodynamic advance, Formula Two in 1982 almost equalled the record set by Formula One in 1975, and even turbo-powered touring cars came very close.

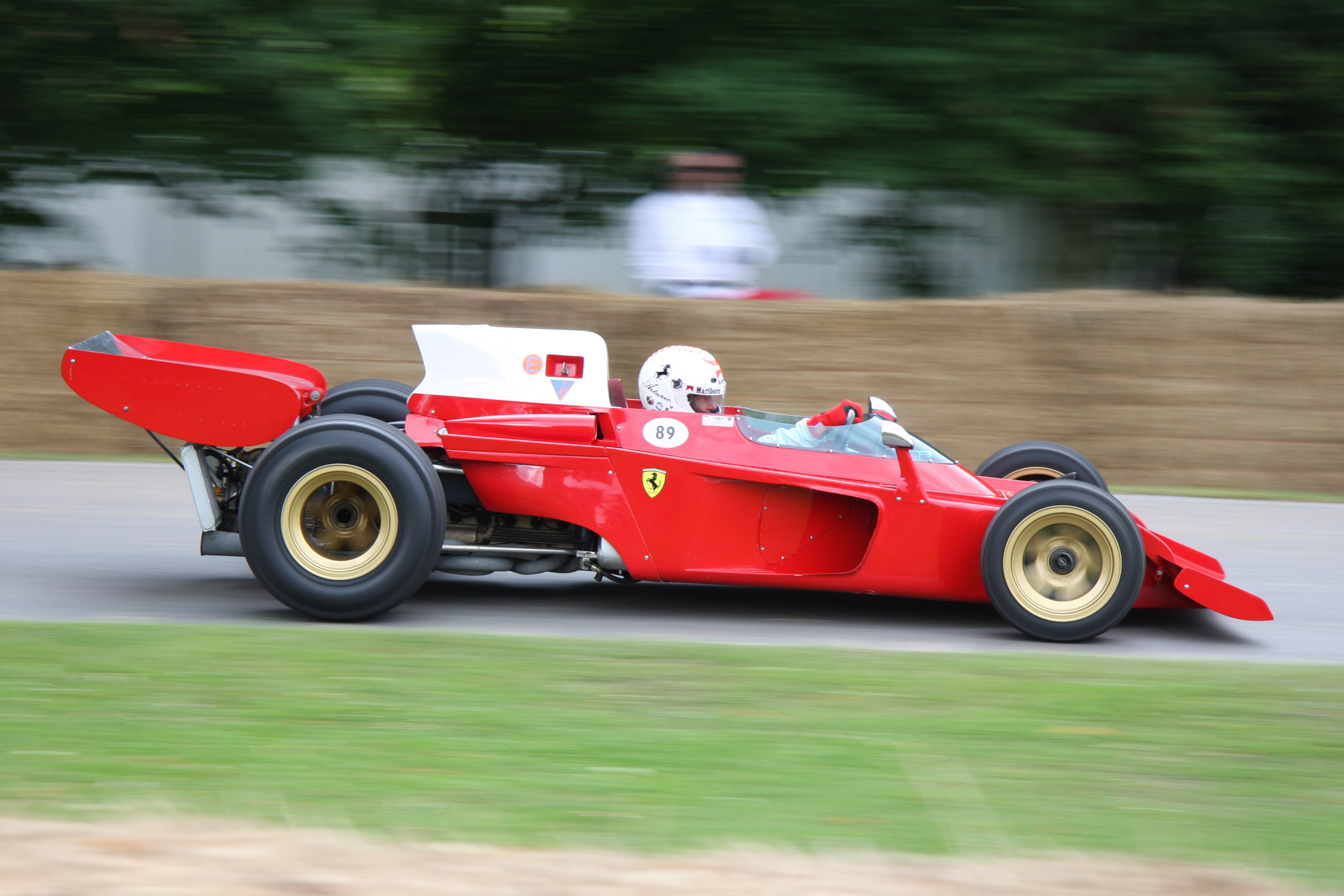
Derek Bell demonstrating the Ferrari 312B3 "Spazzaneve" test car at the 2008 Goodwood Festival of Speed

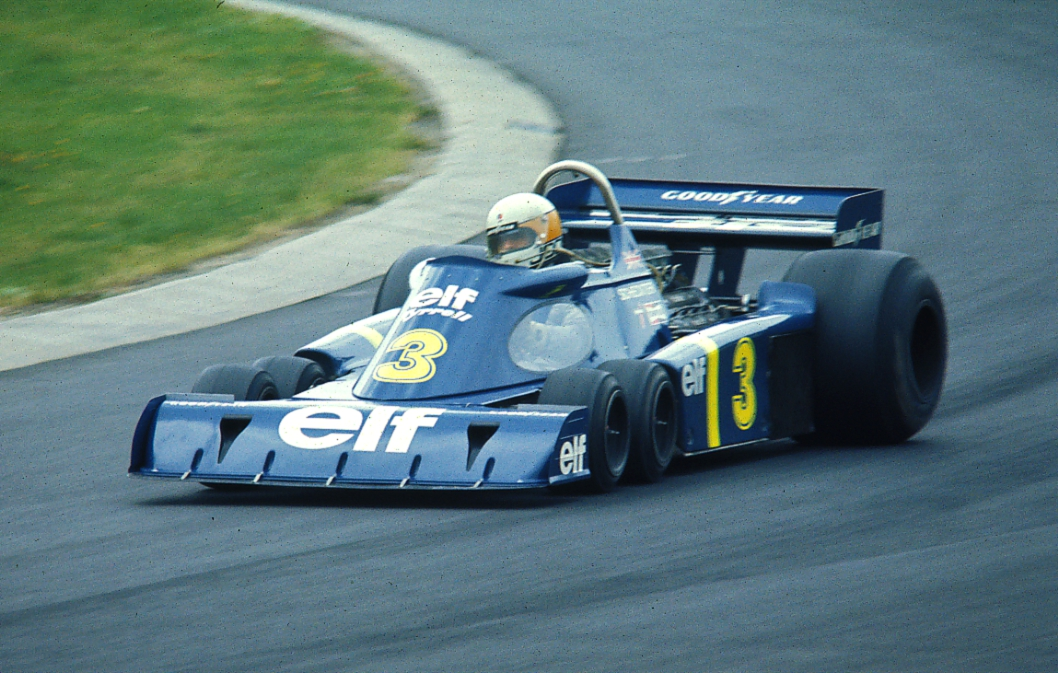
The odd 6-Wheel Tyrrell P34 set the fastest lap in 1976. Here, Jody Scheckter tackles the 270° Südkehre turn.

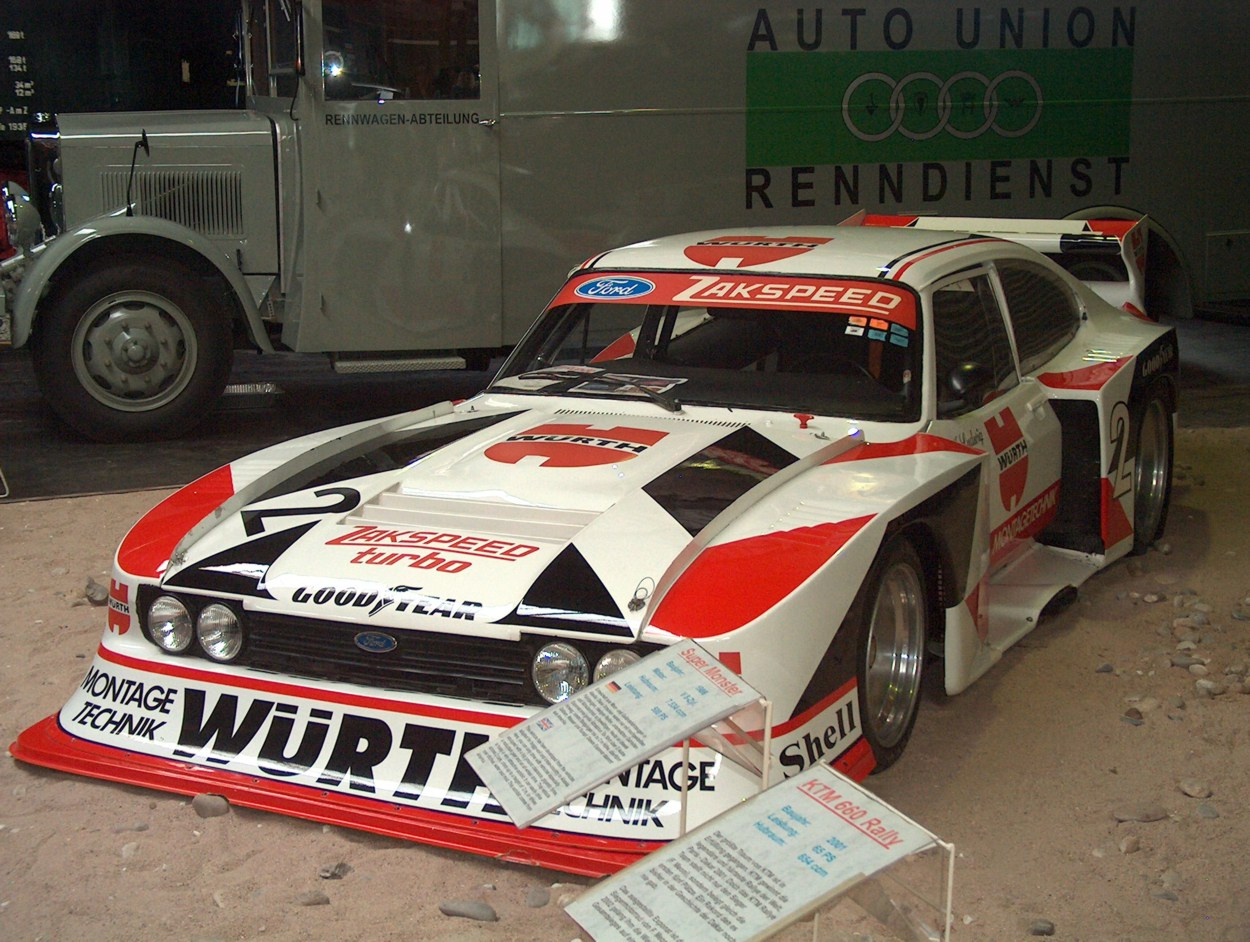
Zakspeed Capri of Klaus Ludwig

Date	Time	km/h	Make model	Class	Driver	Event	Notes
2 May 1971	7:57.1	172.3	March 712M	F2	Ronnie Peterson	1971 Eifelrennen Formula 2	Fastest lap
29 May 1971	7:36.1	180.2	Ferrari 312PB	Gr. 5 SC	Jacky Ickx/Clay Regazzoni	1971 1000 km Nürburgring	Pole-position
30 May 1971	7:40.8	178.4	Ferrari 312PB	Gr. 5 SC	Jacky Ickx	1971 1000 km Nürburgring	Fastest lap
25 June 1971	9:26.2	145.2	BMW 2002 Alpina	Gr. 2	Hans-Joachim Stuck/Gunther Huber	1971 24 Hours Nürburgring	Pole-position
31 July 1971	7:19.0	187.3	Tyrrell Ford	F1	Jackie Stewart	1971 German Grand Prix	Pole-position
1 August 1971	7:20.1	186.8	Tyrrell Ford	F1	François Cevert	1971 German Grand Prix	Fastest lap
3 April 1972	7:36.0	180.3	Porsche 917/10	Gr. 7 CanAm	Willy Kauhsen	1972 Interserie 300 km Goodyear-Pokal	Pole-position
30 April 1972	7:51.6	174.3	Brabham BT38 - Ford BDA	F2	Derek Bell	1972 Eifelrennen Formula 2	Fastest lap
30 April 1972	8:59.7	152.3	Ford Capri RS 2600	Gr. 2	Hans-Joachim Stuck	1972 Eifelrennen DRM	Pole-position Div. I
27 May 1972	7:56.1	172.7	Ferrari 312PB	Gr. 5 SC	Ronnie Peterson/Tim Schenken	1972 1000 km Nürburgring	Pole-position
28 May 1972	7:42.2	177.9	Alfa Romeo T33 TT/3	Gr. 5 SC	Rolf Stommelen	1972 1000 km Nürburgring	Fastest lap
22 June 1972	9:07.0	150.3	BMW 2800 CS Alpina	Gr. 2	Helmut Kelleners/Gerold Pankl	1972 24 Hours Nürburgring	Pole-position
29 July 1972	8:56.5	153.2	Porsche 911S Kremer	Gr. 4	John Fitzpatrick	1972 German GP ECGT Nürburgring Trophäe	Fastest lap
29 July 1972	7:07.0	192.5	Ferrari 312B2	F1	Jacky Ickx	1972 German Grand Prix	Pole-position
30 July 1972	7:13.6	189.6	Ferrari 312B2	F1	Jacky Ickx	1972 German Grand Prix	Fastest lap
23 September 1972	7:23.8	185.2	Porsche 917/10 TC	Gr. 7 CanAm	Willy Kauhsen	1972 Interserie AvD-Preis	Pole-position
26 May 1973	7:12.8	189.9	Ferrari 312PB	Gr. 5 SC	François Cevert/Jean-Pierre Beltoise	1973 1000 km Nürburgring	Pole-position
26 May 1973	8:20.6	164.2	Porsche Carrera RSR Proto	Gr. 5 GT	Gijs van Lennep/Herbert Müller	1973 1000 km Nürburgring	In practice
27 May 1973	7:20.3	186.7	Matra-Simca MS670B	Gr. 5 SC	François Cevert	1973 1000 km Nürburgring	Fastest lap
22 June 1973	8:39.6	158.2	BMW 3.0 CSL Alpina	Gr. 2	Niki Lauda/Hans-Peter Joisten	1973 24 Hours Nürburgring	Fastest lap
4 August 1973	7:07.8	192.2	Tyrrell Ford	F1	Jackie Stewart	1973 German Grand Prix	Pole-position
5 August 1973	7:11.4	190.6	Surtees Ford	F1	Carlos Pace	1973 German Grand Prix	Fastest lap
16 May 1974	6:58.2	196.6	Ferrari 312B3	F1	Niki Lauda	1974 Formula One season	Ferrari test sessions
18 May 1974	7:10.8	190.8	Matra-Simca MS670C	Gr. 6	Gérard Larrousse/Henri Pescarolo	1974 1000 km Nürburgring	Pole-position
18 May 1974	7:56.5	172.5	Porsche Carrera RSR Turbo 2.1	Gr. 5 GT	Herbert Müller/Gijs van Lennep	1974 1000 km Nürburgring	In practice
19 May 1974	7:15.9	188.6	Matra-Simca MS670C	Gr. 6	Jean-Pierre Jarier	1974 1000 km Nürburgring	Fastest lap
3 August 1974	7:00.8	195.4	Ferrari 312B3	F1	Niki Lauda	1974 German Grand Prix	Pole-position
4 August 1974	7:11.1	190.7	Tyrrell Ford	F1	Jody Scheckter	1974 German Grand Prix	Fastest lap
2 August 1975	6:58.6	196.4	Ferrari 312T	F1	Niki Lauda	1975 German Grand Prix	Pole-position
3 August 1975	7:06.4	192.8	Ferrari 312T	F1	Clay Regazzoni	1975 German Grand Prix	Fastest lap, lap record
30 July 1976	7:06.5	192.7	McLaren M23-Ford	F1	James Hunt	1976 German Grand Prix	Pole-position
1 August 1976	7:10.8	190.8	Tyrrell P34-Ford	F1	Jody Scheckter	1976 German Grand Prix	Fastest lap
29 April 1979	7:31.7	182	Porsche 935 K3	Gr. 5	Klaus Ludwig	1979 Eifelrennen DRM	Pole-position Div. I
29 April 1979	7:44.4	177	Ford Capri Zakspeed Turbo	Gr. 5	Hans Heyer	1979 Eifelrennen DRM	Pole-position Div. II
29 April 1979	7:37.3	179.8	Porsche 935 K3	Gr. 5	Klaus Ludwig	1979 Eifelrennen DRM	Fastest race lap Div. I (179.760 km/h)
29 April 1979	7:46.3	176.3	Ford Capri Zakspeed Turbo	Gr. 5	Hans Heyer	1979 Eifelrennen DRM	Fastest race lap Div. II (176.290 km/h)
30 March 1980	7:30.52	182.5	Ford Capri Zakspeed Turbo	Gr. 5	Klaus Ludwig	1980 Deutsche Rennsport Meisterschaft	Pole-position
30 March 1980	7:56.21	172.6	Zakspeed Capri Turbo	Gr. 5	Harald Ertl	1980 Deutsche Rennsport Meisterschaft	
30 March 1980	7:45.44	176.6	BMW 320 Turbo	Gr. 5	Hans-Joachim Stuck	1980 Eifelrennen DRM	Fastest category II car
27 April 1980	7:23.65	185.3	March 802 - BMW	F2	Mike Thackwell	1980 Eifelrennen Formula 2	Fastest lap
25 April 1981	7:10.25	191.1	March 812 - BMW/Rosche	F2	Corrado Fabi	1981 Eifelrennen Formula 2	Pole-position
26 April 1981	7:10.33	191	March 812 - BMW/Rosche	F2	Thierry Boutsen	1981 Eifelrennen Formula 2	Fastest lap and race win
24 May 1981	7:27.02	183.9	Porsche 936/80 Turbo	Gr. 6	Jochen Mass	1981 Interserie 1000 km-Rennen, Nürburgring	Pole-position
25 April 1982	7:06.51	192.7	Maurer MM82-BMW	F2	Stefan Bellof	1982 Eifelrennen Formula 2	Fastest lap F2 record
4 July 1982	7:08.59	191.8	Ford Capri Zakspeed Turbo 1.7	Gr. 5 Div. I	Klaus Niedzwiedz	1982 Interserie GP der Tourenwagen	Pole-position
11 July 1982	9:02.00	151.7	Jaguar XJ-S	Gr. A	Tom Walkinshaw	1982 6h GP der Tourenwagen ETCC	Pole-position
11 July 1982	9:02.36	151.6	Jaguar XJ-S	Gr. A	Tom Walkinshaw	1982 6h GP der Tourenwagen ETCC	Fastest lap
October 1982	9:17.58	147.4	Ford Capri 3.0	Gr. A	Keke Rosberg/Ari Vatanen/Dieter Schäfer	1982 24 Hours Nürburgring	Fastest lap

As Grand Prix racing had not returned to the Ring after 1976 (Formula One) and 1980 (motorcycles), it was decided to build a new track. In late 1982, after the 24 Hours race, the start/finish loop with the pit facilities section was destroyed, putting an end to the classic 22.8 km layout.

== 1983 (and later) Nordschleife only ==
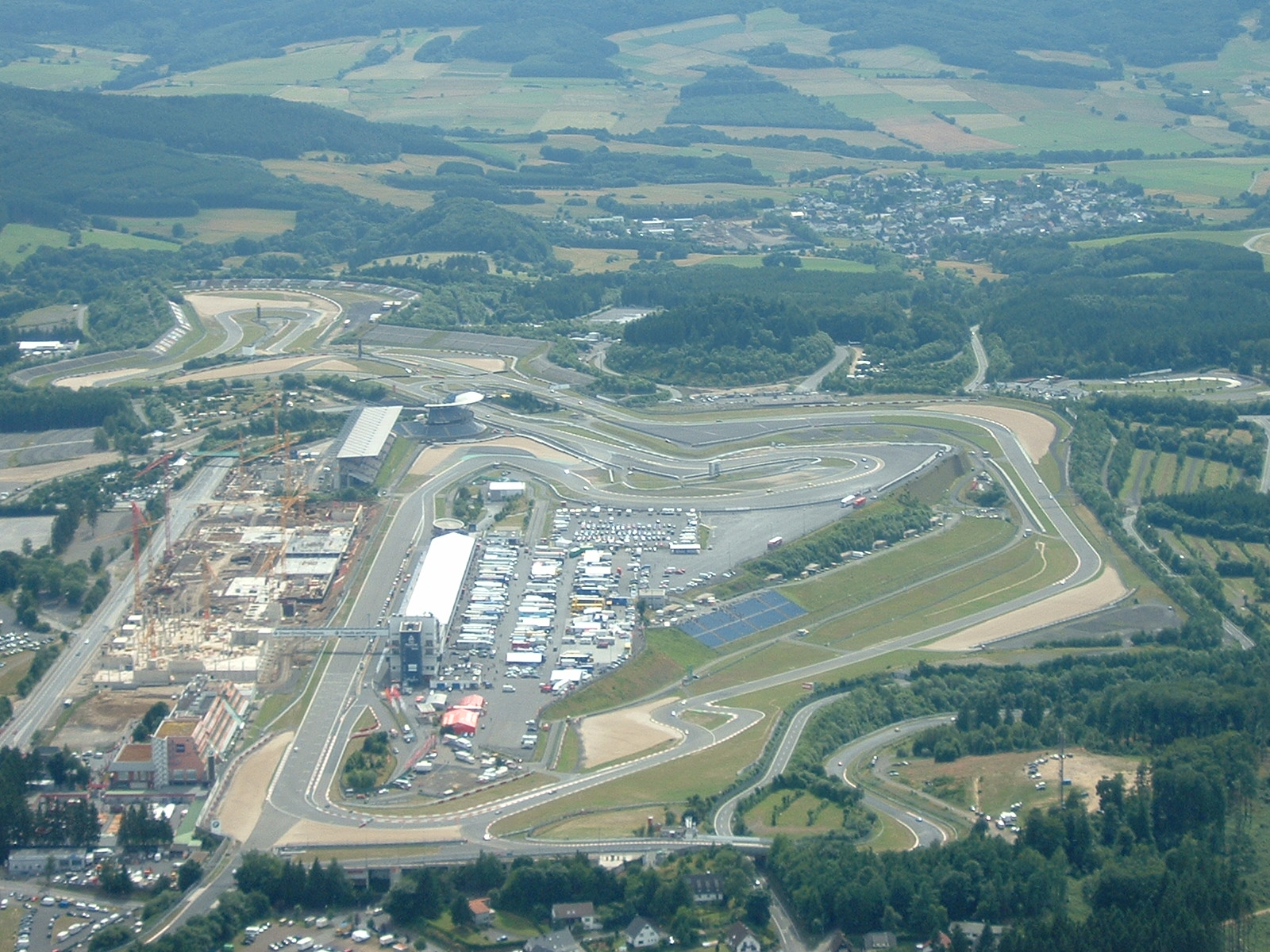
The Ring in 2008 during a VLN race on the 24.4km variant. In the foreground the bypass at T13 grandstand.

With the old start/finish loop and pit facilities having been destroyed, a short bypass with improvised pit facilities was added to allow racing in 1983 while the new track was under construction, to be ready in 1984. Thus, this stop-gap 20.832 km (12.944 mi) Nordschleife-only variant was used by International motorsport sanctioning bodies only in 1983. While Formula Two, World Sportscars and the ETCC competed here, allowing comparison to 1982, DRM and Interserie remained absent, with the DRM having by now switched to Group C sportscars. The 24 Hour race was not held either, as the pits could not accommodate over 100 cars for 24 hours.

Since, this version is used by national events even while other events take place on the adjacent Grand Prix track. The Time Trial Challenge CHC / RCN / BMW-DEC is done on half a dozen Saturday afternoons, with race cars over 15 laps in total, of which 9 are flat out, and the others have to be done within a given time frame, as warm up lap, pit stop laps, and cool down lap. The GLP Regularity Test on Saturday morning is no racing series, with road legal cars having to cover 12 laps in a constant lap time of their choice, between 10 and 15 minutes. Top ten finishers achieve less than 1/10 second difference per lap.

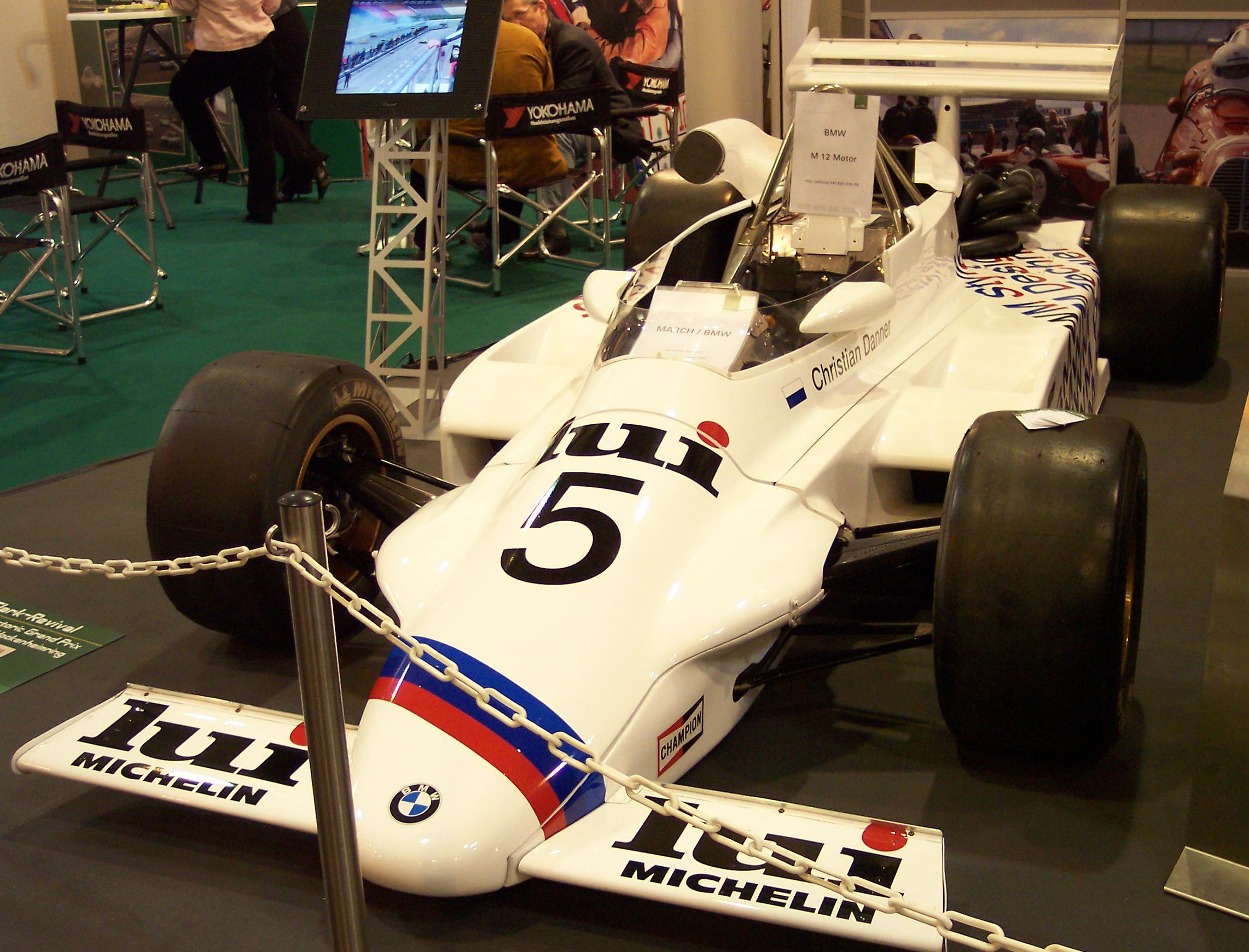
Christian Danner's 1982 March 822 BMW, Techno-Classica 2007

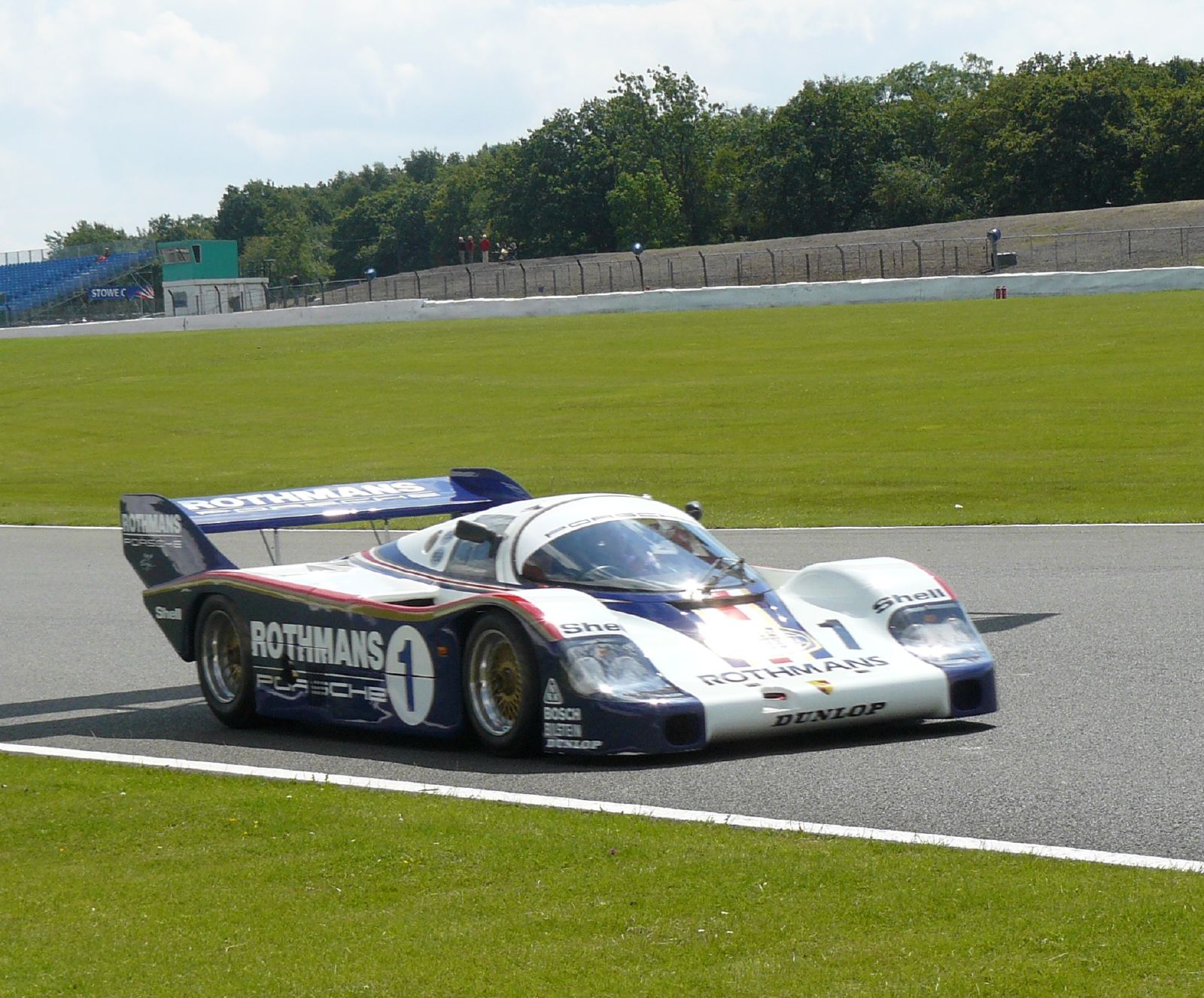
Porsche 956, overall record holder on the 20832m variant

Date	Time	km/h	Make model	Class	Driver	Event, notes, source
22 April 1983	6:31.88	191.4	March 832-BMW	F2	Christian Danner	F2 Eifelrennen fastest in first training session
23 April 1983	6:26.19	194.2	March 832-BMW	F2	Christian Danner	F2 Eifelrennen pole position
24 April 1983	6:28.03	193.3	March 832-BMW	F2	Christian Danner	F2 Eifelrennen fastest lap
28 May 1983	7:19.67	170.6	Anson SA4-Toyota	F3	Franz Konrad	Formula 3 lap record
28 May 1983	6:11.13	202.1	Porsche 956-007 #2	Gr. C	Stefan Bellof	1000 km Nürburgring pole position, fastest lap ever
28 May 1983	6:16.85	199.0	Porsche 956-005 #1	Gr. C	Jochen Mass	1000 km Nürburgring 2nd in qualifying, race winner with Jacky Ickx
29 May 1983	6:25.91	194.3	Porsche 956-007 #2	Gr. C	Stefan Bellof	1000 km Nürburgring official lap record, then crashed (teammate: Derek Bell)
29 May 1983	7:24.29	168.8	BMW M1	Gr. B	Harald Grohs	1000 km Nürburgring Group B lap record
29 May 1983	7:26.88	167.8	Alba AR2 Giannini	Gr. CJ	Carlo Facetti/Martino Finotto	1000 km Nürburgring Group CJ lap record
1983	7:39.31	163.3	Van Diemen-Ford	FF	Maurício Gugelmin	Formula Ford lap record
9 July 1983	7:56.00	157.5	Jaguar XJ-S	Gr. A	Tom Walkinshaw	ETCC 6h GP der Tourenwagen pole position
10 July 1983	8:02.44	155.4	Jaguar XJ-S	Gr. A	Tom Walkinshaw	ETCC 6h GP der Tourenwagen fastest lap
1984	8:07.0	153.9	Rover Vitesse	Gr. A/DTM	Armin Hahne	DTM touring car race lap record
1998	7:54.0	158.2	Opel Kadett C 2.5 16V	Gr. H	Stefan Moses	Castrol-Haugg-Cup first touring car race lap under 8 minutes
1998	8:15.0	151.5	BMW M3 3.2	Gr. F	Klaus Bügler	Group F (improved touring cars) race lap record as of 1999
1998	8:29.82	147.1	Porsche 944 Turbo	Gr. G	Karl-Heinz Wlazik	Group G (standard touring cars) race lap record as of 1999
1998	8:17.0	150.9	Porsche Carrera	Gr. N/GT	Paul Hulverscheid	Group N/GT standard sports car race lap record as of 1999
22 June 2000	7:23	169.3	Porsche 996 GT3-R	Gr. A/GT	Uwe Alzen/Michael Bartels	Castrol-Haugg-Cup before ADAC 24h-Rennen
22 June 2000	7:47	160.6	Opel Astra Kit Car	Gr. A	Volker Strycek	Castrol-Haugg-Cup before ADAC 24h-Rennen
29 May 2003	7:04	176.9	Porsche 996 Turbo	Gr. A/GT	Uwe Alzen	Castrol-Haugg-Cup before ADAC 24h-Rennen
20 September 2008	7:00	178.6	Porsche 997 Turbo	Gr. A/GT SP8	Jürgen Alzen	BMW Driving Experience Challenge "Rhein-Ruhr"
4 October 2008	7:07	175.6	Porsche 997 GT3	Gr. A/GT SP7	Sabine Schmitz	BMW Driving Experience Challenge "Nordeifelpokal", quickest non-turbo lap
5 September 2009	6:58	179.4	Porsche 997 Turbo	Gr. A/GT SP8	Jürgen Alzen	BMW Driving Experience Challenge "Rhein-Ruhr", first lap under 7 min
28 August 2010	7:04	176.8	Corvette C6 SP	RS7/RS8	Stefan Kissling	ADAC Rundstreckenchallenge "Döttinger Höhe", quickest non-turbo lap
7 May 2011	7:29	167.0	Opel Astra OPC Turbo	RS 3 A	Michael Funke	Rundstrecken Challenge Nürburgring, first 2000cc turbo under 7:30
7 May 2011	7:49	159.9	BMW M3 E46	V 6	Steve Jans	Rundstrecken Challenge Nürburgring, record for VLN-Serienwagen

== 1984-2002 Combined variants (VLN & 24h) ==
The VLN series of touring car endurance races was founded in 1977. The long track and the large modern Grand Prix track pit facilities can accommodate up to 230 cars. Usually, VLN races use the short sprint version (Sprintstrecke) of the GP track, taking the Kurzanbindung short cut U-turn on the bridge over the B 258 road, thus bypassing the 1.5 km long section down to Dunlop Kehre. This reduces the number of track workers and adds one or two extra laps of the Nordschleife in the course of a 4h race. In 24h races, the full layout was used.

Variants

- 20.832 kilometres (12.944 mi) without GP track, used by VLN in early 2000 due to construction of new pit lane facilities, no significant times as all races were in wet condition
- 20.932 kilometres (13.007 mi) without GP track, used by VLN in the first two races of 2002 while the new Mercedes Arena was built. The Coca-Cola curve was included, driven in opposite direction, to allow the use of the GP track pitlane and timing facilities
- 23.849 kilometres (14.819 mi) short GP track without Dunlop section (with Castrol-S, 1984–2002)
- 25.359 kilometres (15.757 mi) full GP track with Dunlop section (with Castrol-S, 1984–2002)

km	Date	Time	km/h	Make model	Class	Driver(s)	Event, notes, source
25.359	18 June 1988	9:23.82	161.9	Ford Sierra Cosworth	DTM Group A	Armin Hahne	1988 DTM 24 Stunden Nürburgring, pole position
25.359	17 June 1989	9:09.76	166.0	Mercedes 190E 2.5-16 Evo	DTM Group A	Klaus Ludwig	1989 DTM 24 Stunden Nürburgring, pole position
25.359	16 June 1990	9:05.35	167.4	Mercedes 190E 2.5-16 Evo 2	DTM Group A	Klaus Ludwig	1990 DTM 24 Stunden Nürburgring, pole position
25.359	17 June 1992	8:44.33	174.1	BMW M3 Sport Evolution	DTM Group A	Johnny Cecotto	1992 DTM 24 Stunden Nürburgring, pole position
25.359	18 June 1992	8:46.93	173.2	BMW M3 Sport Evolution	DTM Group A	Johnny Cecotto	1992 DTM 24 Stunden Nürburgring, fastest lap (race 2)
25.359	9 June 1993	8:45.49	173.7	Mercedes 190E AMG	DTM Class 1	Jörg van Ommen	1993 DTM Großer Preis der Tourenwagen, pole position
25.359	10 June 1993	8:47.71	173.0	Alfa Romeo 155 V6 TI	DTM Class 1	Nicola Larini	1993 DTM Großer Preis der Tourenwagen, fastest lap (heat 2)
23.849	8 October 1994	8:29.0	168.6	Mercedes 190E Evo II	DTM/VLN	Olaf Manthey	1994 VLN lap record for Tourenwagen, beaten 6 years later by 10 sec
23.849	1996	9:23.06	147.187	BMW M3 3.0	Group N	Johannes Scheid	1996 VLN lap description for a book by 1996 24h winner
23.849	24 April 1999	8:12.380	174.3	Dodge Viper GTS-R	FIA GT2/24h S5	Peter Zakowski/Hans-Jürgen Tiemann	1999 VLN pole
25.359	4 June 1999	8:48.0	172.9	Dodge Viper GTS-R	GT2/24h S5	Peter Zakowski/Hans-Jürgen Tiemann/Klaus Ludwig	1999 24 Hours pole
25.359	25 June 2000	8:58.014	169.7	Dodge Viper GTS-R	GT2/24h A7	Peter Zakowski/Patrick Huisman/Anthony Beltoise	2000 24 Hours fastest lap
23.849	11 November 2000	8:19.910	171.744	Opel Calibra V6 '92	DTM Class 1	Volker Strycek	2000 VLN lap record for Tourenwagen
25.359	24 May 2001	8:50.533	172.1	Dodge Viper GTS-R	GT2/24h A7	Peter Zakowski/Pedro Lamy/Michael Bartels	2001 24 Hours pole
25.359	26 May 2001	8:58.208	169.6	Dodge Viper GTS-R	GT2/24h A7	Peter Zakowski/Pedro Lamy/Michael Bartels	2001 24 Hours fastest lap (107th of 147), new record 147 laps (3728 km)
25.359	26 May 2001	8:58.703	169.4	Porsche 996 GT3 RS	FIA GT3/24h A6a	Menzel/Luhr/Collard/Abt	2001 24h 2nd fastest lap (103rd of 115) by previous year's winner
20.932	6 April 2002	7:24.356	169.5	Dodge Viper GTS-R	GT2/24h SP7	Peter Zakowski	2002 VLN 27. DMV-4-Stunden pole
20.932	6 April 2002	7:20.098	171.224	Dodge Viper GTS-R	GT2/24h SP7	Peter Zakowski/Pedro Lamy	2002 VLN 27. DMV-4-Stunden fastest race lap

== 2002-present Combined variants (VLN & 24h) ==
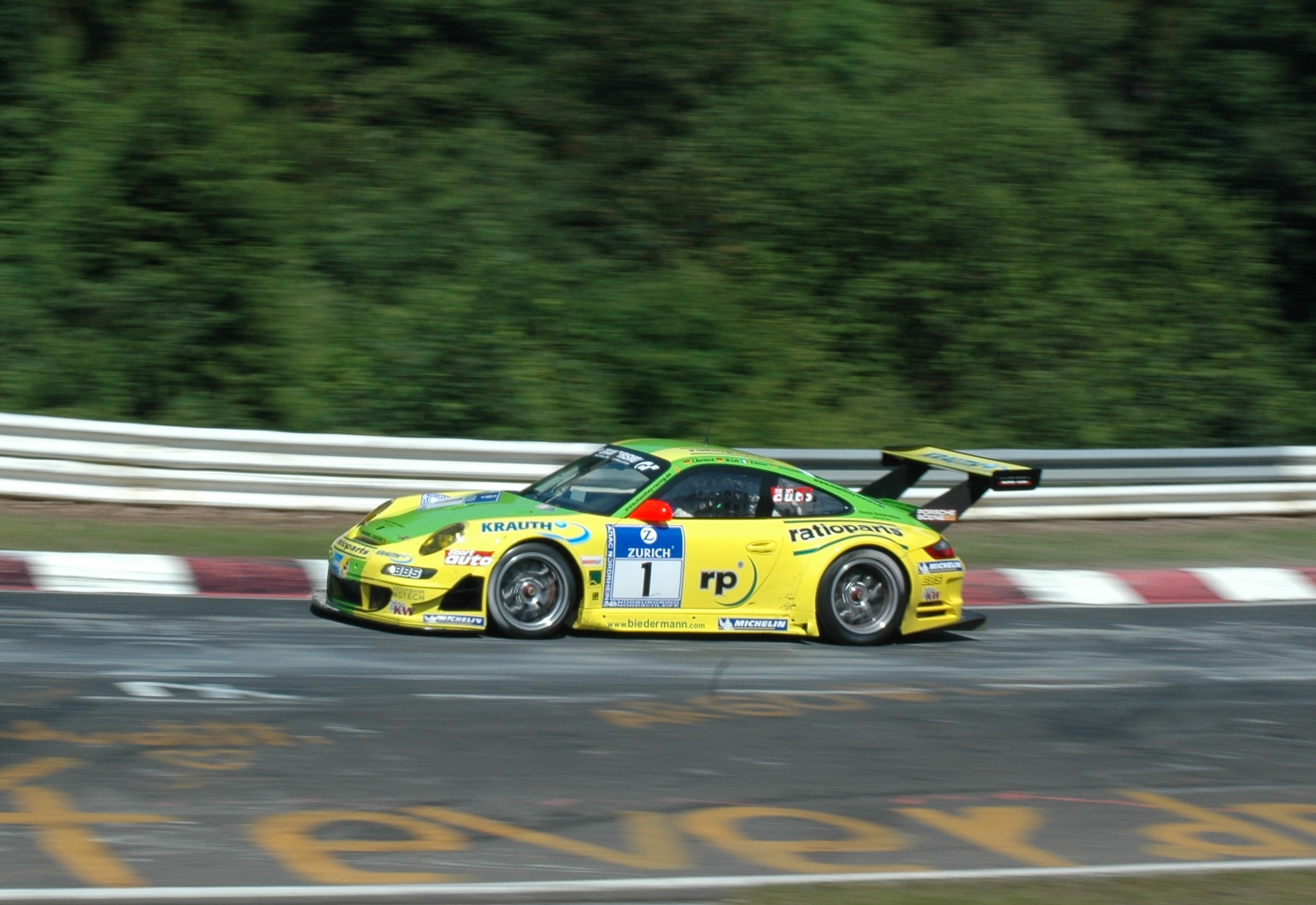
Manthey Racing Porsche 997 GT3 RSR, four-time 24h-winner (2007, '08, '09 & '11), with the #1 inherited from the 996 that won in 2006

In early 2002, the former Castrol S chicane was replaced by the tight Ω-shaped Mercedes Arena. This added 586 metres and about 20-25 seconds to lap times, and also lowered average speeds by about 4% or 6 km/h.

As the 24h Nürburgring weekend includes various supporting races, the organizers use parts of the track as additional paddock area. In 2004, the VLN track variant was used, and the Dunlop section was used as paddock area, but access to the actual pits was impractical. Since 2005, the adjacent Mercedes Arena serves as extra paddock area, and is bypassed by a new, tight Castrol-Z chicane which resembles the old Castrol-S chicane. The track length is reduced by 569m, or, compared to the layout used until 2001, prolonged by c. 20m.

- 23.87 kilometres (14.83 mi) short layout without Dunlop section, without Mercedes Arena via Castrol-Z chicane, not yet used
- 24.4 kilometres (15.2 mi) short layout without Dunlop section, with Mercedes Arena, from April 2002. The official track length was since changed twice without explanation. As the VLN uses the S-shaped motorcycle version of the NKG chicane, it is not affected by changes to the layout of the tight Z-shaped version used by Formula 1
  - 24.433 kilometres (15.182 mi) short layout from 20 April 2002 to 12 May 2007
  - 24.358 kilometres (15.135 mi) first given for the 2004 24h then used in VLN since 26 May 2007
  - 24.369 kilometres (15.142 mi) since 2008 VLN season
- 25.378 kilometres (15.769 mi) long layout with Dunlop section, without Mercedes Arena via Castrol-Z chicane, used in 24h since 2005
- 25.947 kilometres (16.123 mi) maximum layout with Dunlop section, with Mercedes Arena, used in the 2002-2003 24 Hours, and 2003 VLN Eifelrennen.

km	Date	Time	km/h	Make model	Class	Driver(s)	Event, notes, source
24.433	12 October 2002	8:38.105	169.770	Porsche 996 GT3	Gr. A/GT SP11	Wilhelm Dieter Kern / Olaf Manthey	2002 VLN fastest lap
25.947	3 May 2003	9:04.909	171.4	Opel Astra V8 Coupe	DTM E1	Christian Menzel/Volker Strycek/Marcel Tiemann	2003 VLN Eifelrennen pole
25.947	3 May 2003	9:08.008	170.413	Porsche 996 GT2-MR Turbo	Gr. A/GT SP7	Lucas Luhr/Timo Bernhard	2003 VLN Eifelrennen fastest lap
25.947	30 May 2003	9:00.266	172.895	Porsche 996 Turbo	Gr. A/GT A8	Uwe Alzen/Jürgen Alzen/Arno Klasen/Michael Bartels	2003 24 Hours Nürburgring pole
25.947	1 June 2003	9:02.206	172.276	Dodge Viper GTS-R	GT2/24h	Peter Zakowski/Pedro Lamy/Robert Lechner	2003 24 Hours Nürburgring fastest lap, Team DQ'd for fuel tank size
24.358	11 June 2004	8:19.288	175.6	Porsche 996 Turbo	Gr. A/GT A8	Uwe Alzen/Jürgen Alzen/Klaus Ludwig/Michael Bartels	2004 24 Hours Nürburgring pole
24.358	13 June 2004	8:26.742	173.044	Opel Astra V8 Coupe	E1 DTM	Strycek Tiemann/Scheider/Reuter	2004 24 Hours Nürburgring fastest lap
25.378	6 May 2005	8:30.846	178.8	Porsche 996 Turbo	SP8	Uwe Alzen/Jürgen Alzen/Klaus Ludwig/Peter Dumbreck	2005 24 Hours Nürburgring pole
25.378	8 May 2005	8:47.602	173.1	BMW M3 GTR V8	E1 ALMS	Dirk Müller/Jörg Müller/Hans-Joachim Stuck/Pedro Lamy	2005 24 Hours Nürburgring fastest lap
24.433	11 June 2005	8:06.393	180.839	Porsche 996 Turbo	SP8	Uwe Alzen/Jürgen Alzen	2005 VLN best pole
24.433	24 September 2005	8:09.949	179.526	Porsche 996 Turbo	SP8	Uwe Alzen/Jürgen Alzen	2005 VLN race lap record
25.378	16 June 2006	8:38.136	176.3	Porsche 996 GT3-MR	SP7 FIA GT2	Luhr/Bernhard/Rockenfeller/Tiemann	2006 24 Hours Nürburgring pole, Manthey Racing
25.378	18 June 2006	8:43.367	174.564	Porsche 996 GT3-MR	SP7 FIA GT2	Luhr/Bernhard/Rockenfeller/Tiemann	2006 24 Hours fastest lap, new overall distance record 151 laps
25.378	8 June 2007	8:39.560	175.843	Porsche 997 GT3-RSR	SP7 FIA GT2	Bernhard/Lieb/Dumas/Tiemann	2007 24 Hours Nürburgring pole
25.378	10 June 2007	8:49.631	172.499	Dodge Viper GTS-R	SP8 FIA GT2	D. Huisman/Coronel/Patrick Simon/Bouchut	2007 24 Hours Nürburgring fastest lap
25.378	23 May 2008	8:26.730	180.3	Porsche 997 GT3-RSR	SP7 FIA GT2	Bernhard/Lieb/Dumas/Tiemann	2008 24 Hours Nürburgring pole
25.378	25 May 2008	8:39.990	175.697	Porsche 997 GT3-RSR	SP7 FIA GT2	Bernhard/Lieb/Dumas/Tiemann	2008 24 Hours Nürburgring fastest lap
24.369	5 July 2008	8:10.293	178.931	Porsche 997 GT3-RSR	SP7 FIA GT2	Romain Dumas/Marcel Tiemann/Arno Klasen	2008 VLN season best pole normally aspirated cars
24.369	11 October 2008	8:09.779	179.118	Porsche 997 Turbo	SP8	Uwe Alzen	2008 VLN season best pole
24.369	11 October 2008	8:13.408	177.8	Porsche 997 Turbo	SP8	Uwe Alzen/Jürgen Alzen	2008 VLN season fastest lap
24.369	11 October 2008	8:14.750	177.3	Aston Martin DBRS9	SP8	Tomáš Enge/Robert Lechner	2008 VLN season fastest lap normally aspirated cars
25.378	22 May 2009	8:36.536	176.9	Ford GT GT3	SP9 FIA GT3	Dirk Adorf	2009 24 Hours of Nürburgring pole
25.378	24 May 2009	8:36.768	176.793	Porsche 997 GT3-RSR	SP7 FIA GT2	Bernhard/Lieb/Dumas/Tiemann	2009 24 Hours fastest lap, new overall distance record 155 laps
24.369	27 June 2009	8:09.748	179.130	Ford GT GT3	SP9 FIA GT3	Dirk Adorf	2009 VLN season best pole
24.369	29 August 2009	8:56.487	163.524	Audi A3 2.0 Turbo	SP3T	Christoph Breuer	2009 VLN qualifying, first lap under 9 minutes for a FWD car (33rd on grid)
24.369	24 April 2010	8:13.926	177.6	Audi R8 LMS	SP9 FIA GT3	Frank Stippler/Hans-Joachim Stuck/Marc Hennerici	2010 VLN 52. ADAC ACAS H&R-Cup pole
24.369	24 April 2010	8:17.560	176.317	Porsche 911 (997 II) GT3 R	SP9 FIA GT3	Christian Mamerow/Wolf Henzler	2010 VLN 52. ADAC ACAS H&R-Cup fastest lap and winner
25.378	14 May 2010	8:24.753	181.0	Audi R8 LMS	SP9 FIA GT3	Marko Werner	2010 24 Hours Nürburgring pole
25.378	15 May 2010	8:28.587	179.637	Porsche 911 (997 II) GT3 R	SP9 FIA GT3	Marcel Tiemann	2010 24 Hours Nürburgring fastest lap
24.369	3 July 2010	8:07.507	179.953	Porsche 911 (997 II) GT3 R	SP9 FIA GT3	Marc Lieb/Arno Klasen	2010 VLN 50. ADAC Reinoldus-Langstreckenrennen pole and winner
24.369	3 July 2010	8:14.300	177.480	Audi R8 LMS	SP9 FIA GT3	Frank Stippler/Hans-Joachim Stuck	2010 VLN 50. ADAC Reinoldus-Langstreckenrennen fastest lap
24.369	17 July 2010	8:13.913	177.619	Audi R8 LMS	SP9 FIA GT3	Frank Stippler/Hans-Joachim Stuck/Marc Basseng	2010 VLN 33. RCM DMV Grenzlandrennen fastest lap
24.369	31 July 2010	8:13.353	177.821	Porsche 911 (997 II) GT3 R	SP9 FIA GT3	Timo Bernhard/Arno Klasen/Christian Hohenadel	2010 VLN 6h ADAC Ruhr-Pokal-Rennen fastest lap
24.369	30 October 2010	8:58.451	162.927	MINI 1.6 turbo	SP2T	Markus Oestreich	2010 VLN, first lap under 9 min. for a 1600cc turbo FWD car
24.369	30 April 2011	8:13.730	177.685	Mercedes-Benz SLS AMG GT3	SP9 FIA GT3	Christian Mamerow/Armin Hahne	2011 VLN 36. DMV 4-Stunden-Rennen pole
24.369	14 May 2011	8:19.362	175.681	Ferrari F458	SP8 FIA GT2	Marco Seefried/Jamie Melo	2011 VLN 6 hour race, fastest lap and first win for Ferrari
24.369	14 May 2011	8:28.992	172.357	Volkswagen Golf24	SP8T	Thomas Mutsch/Franck Mailleux/Fredrik Ekblom	2011 VLN 6 hour race, sixth overall for the 2500cc turbo 4WD Golf
25.378	23 June 2011	8:23.764	181.356	Ferrari F458 Italia GT	SP8 FIA GT2	Dominik Farnbacher/Allan Simonsen/Marco Seefried/Jamie Melo	2011 24 Hours Nürburgring pole
24.369	27 August 2011	8:55.226	163.909	Raeder-Audi TT RS	SP4T	Christian Hohenadel	2011 VLN 6h pole, first with a FWD car (2500cc turbo)
24.369	27 August 2011	8:31.333	171.568	Raeder-Audi TT RS	SP4T	Frank Biela/Christian Hohenadel/Michael Ammermüller	2011 VLN 6h fastest VLN lap with a FWD car, first FWD win since 1979
24.369	24 September 2011	8:12.265	178.214	Audi R8 LMS	SP9 GT3	Christopher Haase/ Frank Stippler	2011 VLN 43. ADAC Barbarossapreis pole
24.369	24 September 2011	8:13.445	177.788	Porsche 911 (997 II) GT3 R	SP9 GT3	Mike Stursberg/Hans Guido Riegel/René Rast	2011 VLN 43. ADAC Barbarossapreis fastest lap
24.369	29 October 2011	8:04.471	181.081	Porsche 911 (997 II) GT3 R	SP9 GT3	Marc Lieb	2011 VLN 36. DMV Münsterlandpokal pole
24.369	29 October 2011	8:11.194	178.602	Porsche 911 (997 II) GT3 R	SP9 GT3	Lucas Luhr/Marc Lieb	2011 VLN 36. DMV Münsterlandpokal fastest lap
25.378	18 May 2012	8:18.382	183.315	BMW Z4 GT3	SP9 GT3	Uwe Alzen	2012 24 Hours Nürburgring pole, in Top40 qualifying
24.369	23 June 2012	8:05.783	180.592	Audi R8 LMS ultra	SP9 GT3	Frank Stippler	2012 VLN 43. Adenauer ADAC Rundstrecken-Trophy pole
24.369	23 June 2012	8:12.425	178.156	Audi R8 LMS ultra	SP9 GT3	Marc Basseng/Frank Stippler	2012 VLN 43. Adenauer ADAC Rundstrecken-Trophy fastest lap (and win)
24.369	7 July 2012	8:05.317	180.765	Porsche 911 (997 II) GT3 R	SP9 GT3	Marc Lieb/Jochen Krumbach	2012 VLN 52. ADAC Reinoldus-Langstreckenrennen pole
24.369	21 July 2012	8:10.521	178.847	Porsche 911 (997 II) GT3 R	SP9 GT3	Jochen Krumbach/Romain Dumas	2012 VLN 35. RCM DMV Grenzlandrennen fastest lap
24.369	4 August 2012	8:07.736	179.869	Mercedes-Benz SLS AMG GT3	SP9 GT3	Thomas Jäger/Alexander Roloff/Jan Seyffarth	2012 VLN 6h ADAC Ruhr-Pokal-Rennen pole (and win)
24.369	4 August 2012	8:11.288	178.568	Audi R8 LMS ultra	SP9 GT3	Frank Stippler/René Rast/Marc Basseng	2012 VLN 6h ADAC Ruhr-Pokal-Rennen fastest lap
24.369	25 August 2012	8:09.221	179.323	Audi R8 LMS ultra	SP9 GT3	Frank Biela/Christian Hohenadel/Thomas Mutsch	2012 VLN 44. ADAC Barbarossapreis fastest lap, race win, new VLN race lap record by Thomas Mutsch
25.378	18 May 2013	8:17.212	183.746	Audi R8 LMS ultra	SP9 GT3	Frank Stippler	2013 24 Hours Nürburgring pole, in Top40 qualifying
24.369	22 June 2013	8:03.632	181.395	Porsche 911 (997 II) GT3 R	SP9 GT3	Norbert Siedler	2013 VLN 44. Adenauer ADAC Simfy Trophy pole
24.369	22 June 2013	8:03.113	181.590	Audi R8 LMS ultra	SP9 GT3	Frank Stippler/Ferdinand Stuck/Johannes Stuck	2013 VLN 44. Adenauer ADAC Simfy Trophy fastest lap
24.358	20 July 2013	8:02.418	181.769	BMW Z4 GT3	SP9 GT3	Uwe Alzen	2013 VLN 53. ADAC Reinoldus-Langstreckenrennen pole
24.358	28 September 2013	8:01.069	182.279	BMW Z4 GT3	SP9 GT3	Uwe Alzen	2013 VLN 45. ADAC Barbarossapreis pole
25.378	20 June 2014	8:10.921	186.101	McLaren MP4-12C GT3	SP9 GT3	Kévin Estre	2014 24 Hours Nürburgring pole
24.358	2 August 2014	8:00.973	182.315	BMW Z4 GT3	SP9 GT3	Max Sandritter/Thomas Jäger/Dominik Baumann/Jens Klingmann	2014 VLN 37. RCM DMV Grenzlandrennen pole
24.358	2 August 2014	7:59.045	183.049	BMW Z4 GT3	SP9 GT3	Jens Klingmann	2014 VLN 37. RCM DMV Grenzlandrennen fastest lap
24.358	11 October 2014	7:57.474	183.651	Audi R8 LMS ultra	SP9 GT3	Frank Stippler	2014 VLN ROWE DMV 250-Meilen-Rennen
25.378	16 May 2015	8:37.384	182.656	Citroën C-Elysée WTCC	FIA WTCC	Yvan Muller	2015 FIA WTCC Race of Germany Race 2, fastest lap
25.378	11 May 2018	8:09.105	186.792	Porsche 911 (991) GT3 R	SP9 GT3	Laurens Vanthoor/Romain Dumas/Kévin Estre	2018 24 Hours Nürburgring pole
25.378	5 June 2021	8:53.608	171.213	Hyundai Elantra N TCR	TCR	Jean-Karl Vernay	2021 FIA WTCR Race of Germany Race 2, fastest lap
25.378	19 May 2023	8:08.006	187.212	Ferrari 296 GT3	SP9 GT3	Daniel Keilwitz	2023 24 Hours of Nürburgring fastest lap

== 2007 BMW F1 demonstration laps ==
After the VLN 4h endurance race of 28 April 2007 which hosted also a BMW publicity day for fans, Nick Heidfeld drove a BMW Sauber F1.06 Formula One car around the Nordschleife and short GP-track, as used in VLN races, with a track length of 24.433 km (thus comparison with 1970s times is difficult). For safety reasons, BMW had announced that the car was slowed with hard demonstration tires, maximum ride height, and 275 km/h top speed limited by the transmission. Heidfeld drove three laps on the combined Nordschleife, slowing down once in each lap when passing a camera car.

The official lap time released by BMW Sauber was declared to be 8:34, thus slower than the 8:17 of the pole-setting Porsche. The German press duly reported this lap time, yet criticized BMW. In each lap, Heidfeld had slowed down once to pose for a slow video truck, at Schwedenkreuz on the first lap 1, Kesselchen in lap 2, and Döttinger Höhe in the last lap. The two time spans in between the three passes of Heidfeld were clocked by some fans around the track, first Wehrseifen to Wehrseifen in about 7:28, then 7:31 from Klostertal to Klostertal, which was over 40 seconds quicker than the pole-setting Porsche 996 GT3 RSR. This translates to an average of about 195 km/h (121 mph), similar to Bellof's race record, but it's hard to judge the average speed on the slower GP section with the setup Heidfeld had to use. In the 2007 GP, the fastest lap was barely faster, 199 km/h. Fans who respect the official record of the late Stefan Bellof settle for an "estimated 6:12".

Road & Track magazine reported Heidfeld's lap was a 5:57 or 5:58 (for the Nordschleife only), however their times were generated by measuring the speed in some corners, and then calculating a lap time, and not timing a full lap. Heidfeld has since expressed his desire to repeat the experience with less restriction, as well as for a participation in the 24h race.

According to F1 Racing magazine of June 2006, BMW engineers had estimated that a BMW-Sauber F1.06 could lap in under 5:15.8, which equals to an average of 237 km/h (147 mph).

== Motorcycles ==
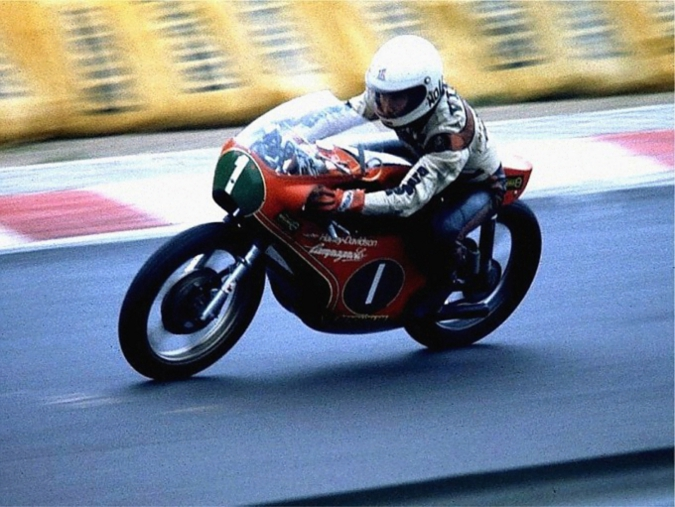
World Champion Walter Villa on Harley-Davidson (Aermacchi) 250cc in 1976

Date	Time	km/h	Make model	Rider	Event, notes, source
18 June 1927		89.6	BMW 500	Toni Bauhofer	1927 Eifelrennen, best rider
3 July 1927		91.5	Sunbeam 500	Graham Walker	1927 German motorcycle Grand Prix (GP of Europe), best rider
1937		102.3	DKW 600	Braun/N.N.	1937 Eifelrennen, first sidecar over 100 km/h
1937		120	BMW	Karl Gall	1937 Eifelrennen
1954		127.8	NSU 250	Werner Haas	1954 Eifelrennen
26 June 1955	10:23.3	131.7	Gilera 500cc	Geoff Duke	1955 German motorcycle Grand Prix lap record, stood until 1970
20 July 1958			MV Agusta 500cc	John Surtees	1958 German motorcycle Grand Prix
3 May 1970			MZ	László Szabó	1970 German motorcycle Grand Prix, first under 10min
3 May 1970			MV Agusta 500cc	Giacomo Agostini	1970 German motorcycle Grand Prix winner, held in connection with Eifelrennen F2 race
30 April 1972	9:30.9	144.0	MV Agusta 500cc	Giacomo Agostini	1972 German motorcycle Grand Prix winner, held in connection with Eifelrennen F2 race
28 April 1974			Yamaha TZ 380	Edmund Czihak	1974 German motorcycle Grand Prix winner, to be held in connection with Eifelrennen car races, boycotted by top riders due to safety dispute
29 August 1976	8:57.3	153.3	Harley-Davidson 350cc	Walter Villa	1976 German motorcycle Grand Prix first under 9min
20 August 1978	8:29.5		Suzuki 500cc	Virginio Ferrari	1978 German motorcycle Grand Prix winner
20 August 1978	8:39.7		Yamaha 350cc	Takazumi Katayama	1978 German motorcycle Grand Prix winner
20 August 1978	8:49.5		Kawasaki 250cc	Kork Ballington	1978 German motorcycle Grand Prix winner
20 August 1978	9:17.0		Minarelli 125cc	Ángel Nieto	1978 German motorcycle Grand Prix winner
20 August 1978	10:15.8		Bultaco 50cc	Ricardo Tormo	1978 German motorcycle Grand Prix winner
24 August 1980	8:44.8		Sidecar	Rolf Biland/Kurt Waltisperg	1980 German motorcycle Grand Prix side car, pole and first team under 9min
24 August 1980	8:25.9		Yamaha 350cc	Jon Ekerold	1980 German motorcycle Grand Prix fastest 350cc motorcycle lap
24 August 1980	8:22.2	163.6	Suzuki 500cc	Marco Lucchinelli	1980 German motorcycle Grand Prix winner, fastest motorcycle lap ever on 22.835 m variant, last Moto-GP held there
13 June 1982			Kawasaki 1000	Jacques Cornu/Jean-Claude Chemarin	1982 Endurance World Championship winners, last event

Due to safety reasons, motorcycle races moved to the modern track since 1984. Similar to the Isle of Man TT, amateur enthusiasts continued to compete on the old track in endurance events. In the 1990s, only the so-called Zuverlässigkeitsfahrt (Zuvi, reliability run) series remained, for amateurs on road legal stock bikes. The events consisted mostly of regularity laps, also on other race tracks like Hockenheimring, with a short time trial. On the Nordschleife, after a reliability run with road legal bikes and tyres, a single lap time trial from standing start covered an incomplete lap of about 20.7 km. As the event was discontinued after 1994 in which Dähne's time was not beaten, his 1993 time remains the fastest officially timed motorcycle lap ever on the 20.832 m variant.

Dähne set the first of his record there in August 1988 with a Suzuki GSX-R at 7:55.07. Then, with a 750cc Honda RC30 VFR750R, he subsequently lowered it to 7:53.08 in July 1990, to 7:50.71 in June 1992, and on 23 May 1993, using Metzeler ME Z1 tyres, set yet another record, with 7:49.71. After the 1993 event, an onboard-video was produced in which Dähne did another lap, about 10 secs slower, carrying camera equipment on his back.

Date	Time	km/h	Make model	Rider	Event, notes, source
August 1988	7:55.07		Suzuki GSX-R 1000	Helmut Dähne	1988 Zuverlässigkeitsfahrt
July 1990	7:53.08		Honda VFR750R RC30	Helmut Dähne	1990 Zuverlässigkeitsfahrt, win and new lap record
June 1992	7:50.71		Honda VFR750R RC30	Helmut Dähne	1992 Zuverlässigkeitsfahrt
23 May 1993	7:49.71		Honda VFR750R RC30	Helmut Dähne	1993 Zuverlässigkeitsfahrt, VFR750R RC30 and Metzeler ME Z1 tires both road legal.
2 July 1994	7:55.78			Herbert Mandelartz	1994 Zuverlässigkeitsfahrt winner

== See also ==
- List of Nürburgring Nordschleife lap times
