= Helmut Dähne =

German motorcycle racer

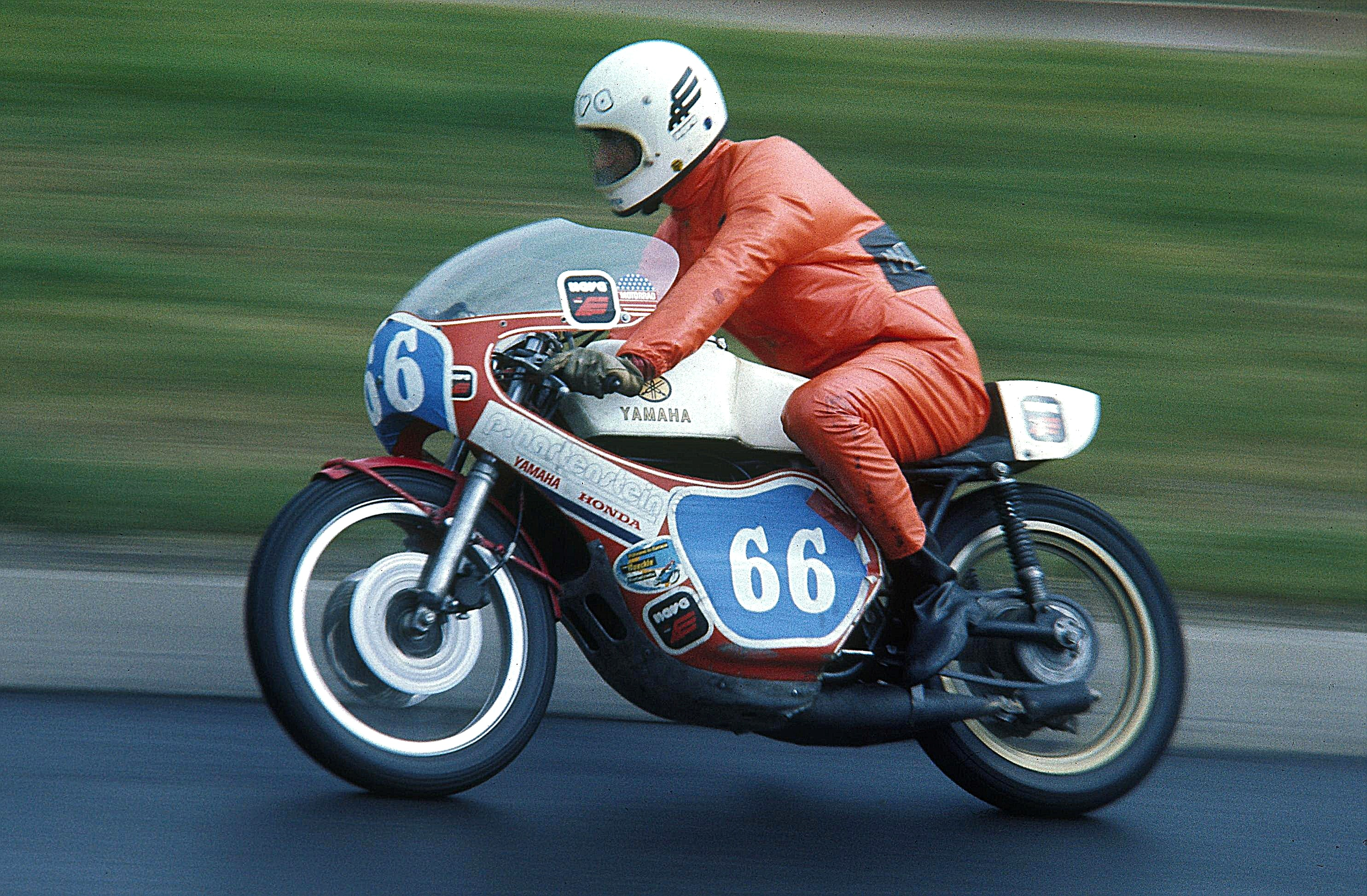
- Dähne during practice for the 1976 German Grand Prix.
- Nationality: German
- Born: 29 November 1944 (age 81)
Motorcycle racing career statistics
Isle of Man TT career
TTs contested	12 (1972-1979, 1984-1986, 1994)
TT wins	0
TT podiums	3

Helmut Dähne (also rendered as Daehne or Dahne, born 29 November 1944 in Altenmark, Germany) is a German former motorcycle racer, active not in Grand Prix races, for which the rather tall Dähne (190 cm) is not well suited, but in endurance racing with production machines, comparable to touring cars and rallying with automobiles. From the 1970s to the 1990s, he was active on the longest circuits of motorcycle racing, the over 20 km long Nürburgring Nordschleife, and the over 60 km long Snaefell Mountain Course of the Isle of Man TT.

== Career ==
Dähne started his career in 1961 as a teenager began working for BMW motorcycle department as a mechanic, then since 1976 developed motorcycle tyres for German brand Metzeler and provided service at race tracks to customers, is now a PR manager, a Works BMW motorcycling legend and known for his trademark red and white leathers.

=== Off-road contests ===
Dähne entered off-road contests from 1965 to 1971, starting road racing in 1968 with a hillclimbing win at Sudelfeld in the Bavarian Alps. From 1972 to 1986, he started 23 events at the Isle of Man Tourist Trophy. In 1976, he and partner Hans-Otto Butenuth were the fastest finisher in the Production TT with a 900cc BMW R 90 S. Being one of the few non-British riders who could keep up with the locals, Dähne came second twice, in 1986, and in 1984 by only 2 seconds.

=== German Seriensport ===
Dähne entered in the German "Seriensport" championship, a series of contests for road legal machinery, where he could test and showcase the products of his employers. In 1973 he won the first of these Rally German Championships in the 1000cc class, 15 in total, the last in 1993. The 1000 km Hockenheimring, an Easter Saturday event for a team of two riders doing a long-distance reliability run concluded with a timed raced, was won by Dähne and his partners 18 times in 26 entries, the last success coming in 2001. Dähne also entered more competitive series, like the Endurance world championship series, in which he finished third in 1980, riding a Honda privately tuned by Eckert. In the 8 Hour race at the Nürburgring, then still 22.8 km long, he and partner Alois Tost finished second behind a factory-entered Honda RCB.

The last Grand Prix races on the long and dangerous circuits took place in 1976 at the Isle of Man, and in 1980 at the Nürburgring. The German track was shortened from 22.8 to 20.8 km in 1983, and the modern 4.5 km GP track was opened in 1984, in order to host competitive racing in a safe environment.

For enthusiasts still willing to ride the Green Hell of the Nordschleife, timed contests were offered as the Seriensport Zuverlässigkeitsfahrten (Zuvi, reliability runs), which contained a single lap time trial run from standing start, thus eliminating at least the danger of riders colliding when racing for position. Also, street legal bikes and tyres were required to keep costs and speed down.

=== Records ===
Dähne set the first of his record there in August 1988 with a Suzuki GSX-R at 7:55.07. Then, with a 750cc Honda RC30 VFR750R, he subsequently lowered it to 7:53.08 in July 1990, to 7:50.71 in June 1992, and on 23 May 1993, using Metzeler ME Z1 tyres, set yet another record, with 7:49.71. After the 1993 event, an onboard-video was produced in which Dähne did another lap, about ten seconds slower, carrying camera equipment on his back. On 2 July 1994, Dähne did not take part in the Zuvi (which was won by Herbert Mandelartz with 7:55.78 min) as he instead returned to the Isle of Man TT for his 24th, 25th and 26th TT races. He scored a personal best of 19:45, but then fell and shattered his lower leg, causing a one-year break.

In 1994, not only Ayrton Senna was killed, but also riders were fatally wounded on the Nordschleife. No motorcycle contests on the Nordschleife were held after 1994, and with the track homologation for motorcycles not being renewed, no organizer can offer officially sanctioned contests there anymore. Thus, Dähne, holding the track record since 1988, will "forever" be the holder of the official record of 7:49.71 he had set in 1993.

Dähne, while riding for a magazine report, crashed in 1996 at the fast Fuchsröhre section of the Nordschleife. He continued to be a front runner in circuit racing, but finished only 3rd in the championship standings in 1997 and 1998, dropping further down the order later. While he won two more victories in the 1000 km Hockenheim in 2001 and 2002, another crash in 2004 ended the competitive career of the 60-year-old. Helmut Dähne has appeared in several other videos or magazine articles, comparing bikes to other bikes or cars, and still is active in public relation events.

== Career statistics ==
=== FIM Endurance World Championship ===
Year	Bike	Rider	TC
1980	Honda	(Germany) Helmut Dahne	3rd

== See also ==
- Nordschleife
- Nordschleife fastest lap times
