= Rundstrecken Challenge Nürburgring =

German motorsport event series

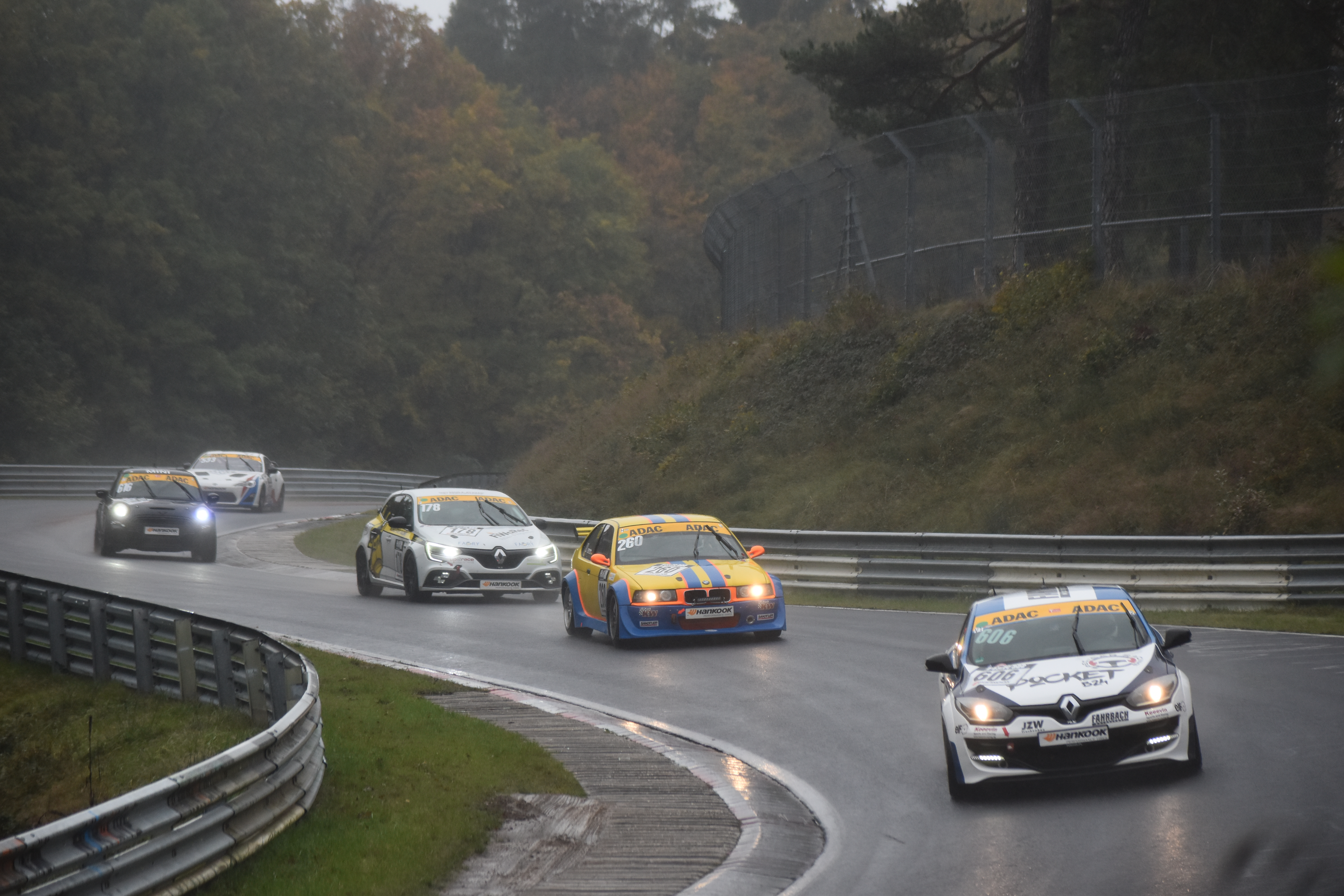
Formation lap of the final round of the 2023 season (Schwedenkreuz 3h)

The Rundstrecken Challenge Nürburgring (RCN) (circuit racing challenge Nürburgring) previously known as Castrol-HAUGG-Cup (CHC), is a motorsport event series. Being run since the early 1960s mainly on the Nürburgring, it is regarded as Germany's oldest touring car racing series. Unlike in regular races for position, the event that is similar to rallying on a closed race circuit, with time challenge laps and co-drivers on board.

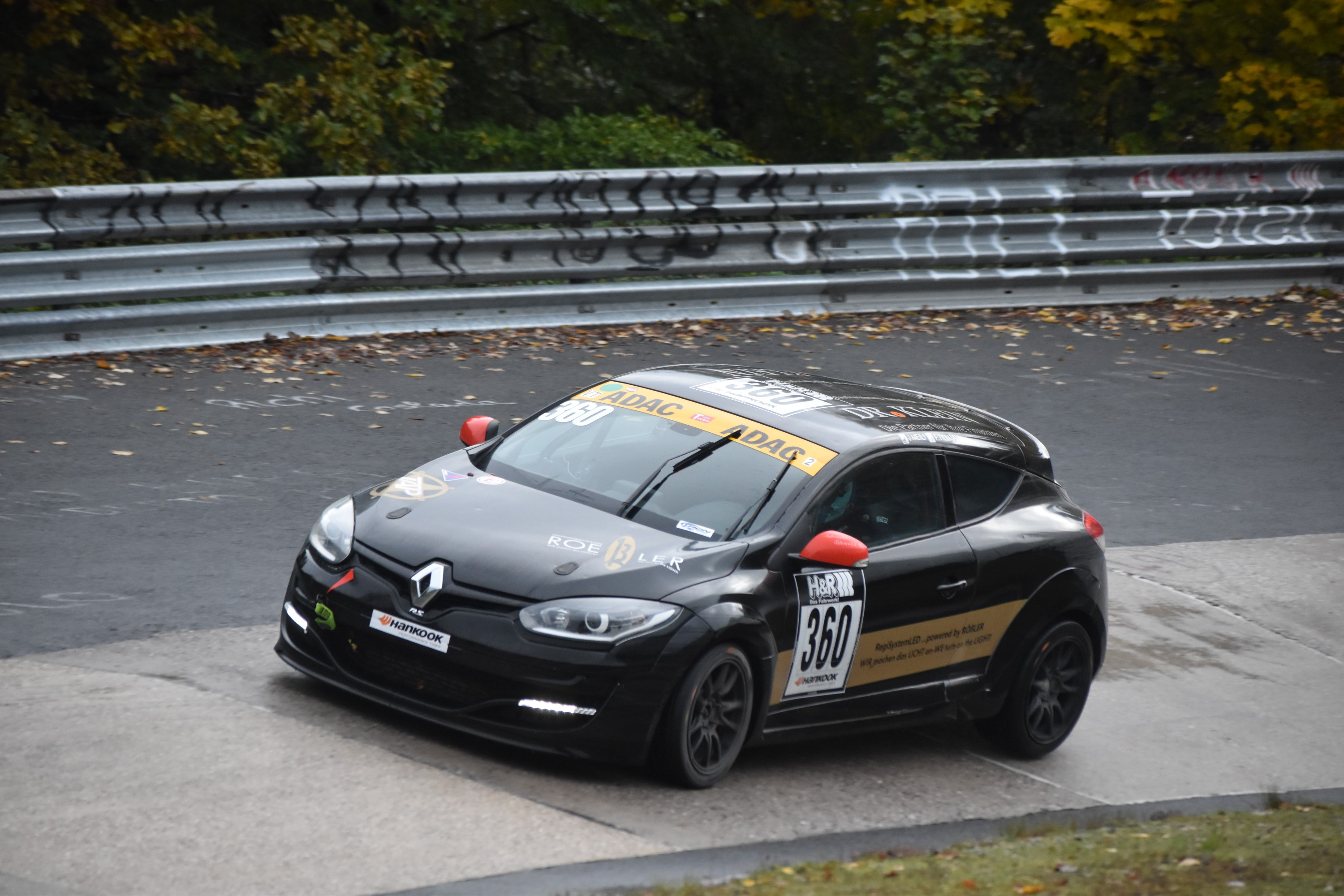
Renault Megane of 2023 champions Joel Meili and Favian Tillmann

For many years, the series was sponsored by Castrol and HAUGG (a company owned by a race driver, providing car parts like radiators). For 2007, the sponsorship arrangements were changed, putting less emphasis on these two companies.

The event is officially styled by the FIA/DMSB as a Leistungsprüfung 200km (LP200, performance test over 200 km). This means that the RCN is not a race for positions among cars that are started at once from a grid (like VLN endurance races), but a time trial, with cars being started one by one, about 5 seconds apart. This reduces the risks of collisions, as there is no benefit for a racer to defend their position.

Most RCN events are held on the Nürburgring, mainly on the 20.832 km long Nordschleife version, on Saturday afternoon following a Gleichmäßigkeitsprüfung (GLP) run by the same organizing club. One or two additional events are held on the Grand Prix track, or on the combined tracks as used in VLN or at the 24h. In the 2000s, some events were held on the Circuit de Spa-Francorchamps. As season highlight in front of thousands of spectators, the RCN usually runs on the Thursday before a 24 Hours Nürburgring race, which is a holiday, either Ascension Day or Corpus Christi (feast). The track versions used during that event include various sections of the Grand Prix track.

On the Nordschleife, 15 laps of 20.832 km have to be run, for 312 km overall (longer than an F1 race). Due to being an amateur event without practise, the first (warm up) lap, the last (cool down) and two laps in between for a pit stop are not timed, unless a generous maximum time is exceeded. Of the remaining 11 laps, 9 are run at full speed (like a special stage in rallying), with each second counting as one penalty point. Two laps have to be done at a given time similar to a liaison stage in rallying. If the tolerance of +/- 2 seconds is exceeded, each second counts tenfold, so some discipline and precision is required. In wet conditions, these laps can decide the winners, as they can add a significant amount of penalty points to the tally.

Since 2012, the final round is the Schwedenkreuz 3h, which unlike the other rounds, is a 3 hour race with a rolling start, and cars racing each other for positions, rather than a time trial.

The entry fee is about 400 Euro. As in rallying, a co-driver can be on board, a quite unique possibility to take a passenger within a circuit racing contest. Also, those two drivers can share a drive, which reduces costs for amateurs.

Championship points are awarded according to amateur rules, depending on the number of entrants in the same class. There are also an entry-level "Light" classes with fewer laps, focusing on regularity, and a separate championship.

== 2024 schedule ==
Rnd.	Date	Track	Support/Parent event
1	13 April	(Germany) Nürburgring 24h-variant	Nürburgring 24 Hours qualifying race Gleichmäßigkeitsprüfung (GLP)
2	27 April	(Germany) Nürburgring Nordschleife	Gleichmäßigkeitsprüfung (GLP)
3	30 May	(Germany) Nürburgring Nordschleife	Nürburgring 24 Hours race
4	29 June	(Germany) Nürburgring Nordschleife	Gleichmäßigkeitsprüfung (GLP)
5	4 August	(Germany) Nürburgring Nordschleife	Gleichmäßigkeitsprüfung (GLP)
6	31 August	(Germany) Nürburgring Nordschleife	Gleichmäßigkeitsprüfung (GLP)
7	22 September	(Germany) Nürburgring Nordschleife	Gleichmäßigkeitsprüfung (GLP)
8	26 October	(Germany) Nürburgring Nordschleife + GP short track	Gleichmäßigkeitsprüfung (GLP)

== RCN champions(since 1990) ==
Year	Driver(s)	Car
2023	Joel Meili; Favian Tillmann	Renault Megane/BMW 325i
2022	Daniel Ostermann	BMW 330i
2021	Dario Stanco	Seat Leon/Audi RS3
2020	Dr. Stein Tveten	BMW 325i
2019	Kevin Totz	BMW 325i/M3
2018	Matthias Unger; Christopher Rink	BMW 325i
2017	Ludger Henrich	Opel Astra GSI
2016	Alexander Fielenbach	Toyota GT86/BMW
2015	Christian Büllesbach	BMW Z4
2014	Christian Büllesbach	BMW Z4
2013	Stefan Schmickler; Christian Scherer	BMW E36 318is
2012	Claudius Karch	Porsche Cayman R
2011	Guido Schuchert	BMW M3
2010	Ludger Henrich	Opel Astra F
2009	Ludger Henrich; Jürgen Schulten	Opel Astra F
2008	Hans-Rolf Salzer	BMW M3
2007	Ludger Henrich; Jürgen Schulten	Honda Civic Type-R
2006	Hans-Rolf Salzer	BMW M3
2005	Ludger Henrich; Jürgen Schulten	Opel Corsa Sport
2004	Jörg Weber	Ford Escort RS2000
2003	Ulrich Ehret	BMW 318iS
2002	Thomas Imig; Petra Dams	VW Golf GTi
2001	Maic Winter	Opel Astra GSi
2000	Jürgen Schulten	Opel Astra/Opel Calibra
1999	Frank-Dieter Lohmann	Ford Escort Cosworth
1998	Mark-Oliver Burghardt; Jens Kolodzey	Opel Manta 16V
1997	Mark-Oliver Burghardt; Jens Kolodzey	Opel Manta 16V
1996	Mark-Oliver Burghardt; Jens Kolodzey	Opel Manta 16V
1995	Walter Schneider	VW Golf GTi
1994	Robert Güntzel	VW Golf GTi
1993	Franz Claer	Suzuki Swift
1992	Walter Schneider	VW Golf GTi
1991	Walter Schneider	VW Golf GTi
1990	Walter Schneider	VW Golf GTi
