= 2015 Dubai 24 Hour =

Seasons
- ← 2014 2016 →

The layout of the Dubai Autodrome.

The 2015 Dubai 24 Hour was the 10th running of the Dubai 24 Hour. The event was held from January 8 to January 10, 2015 at the Dubai Autodrome, United Arab Emirates. There were 14 Code 60 periods in the race totaling over 4 hours. The same number would occur during the 2016 running as well.

== Result ==
Pos	Class	No	Entrant	Drivers	Car	Laps
1	A-6 Pro	2	(Germany) Black Falcon 2	(Saudi Arabia) Abdulaziz Al Faisal (Germany) Hubert Haupt (Netherlands) Yelmer Buurman (United Kingdom) Oliver Webb	Mercedes SLS AMG GT3	604
2	A-6 Pro	30	(United Kingdom) Ram Racing	(India) Cheerang Arya (Germany) Thomas Jäger (United Kingdom) Tom Onslow-Cole (United Kingdom) Adam Christodoulou	Mercedes SLS AMG GT3	600
3	A-6 Am	88	(United Arab Emirates) Dragon Racing 1	(Saudi Arabia) Mohammed Jawa (South Africa) Jordan Grogor (Republic of Ireland) Matt Griffin (United Kingdom) Rob Barff	Ferrari 458 Italia GT3	600
4	A-6 Pro	28	(United Kingdom) KPM Racing 1	(United Kingdom) Paul White (Germany) Stefan Mücke (United Kingdom) Jonathan Adam	Aston Martin Vantage GT3	596
5	A-6 Am	23	(United Kingdom) Nissan GT Academy Team RJN	(Germany) Florian Strauss (Mexico) Ricardo Sanchez (Saudi Arabia) Ahmed Bin Khanen (United States) Nicolas Hammann (France) Gaetan Paletou	Nissan GTR GT3	591
6	A-6 Pro	4	(Czech Republic) Scuderia Praha	(Czech Republic) Jiří Písařík (Czech Republic) Jaromír Jiřík (Italy) Matteo Malucelli (Netherlands) Peter Kox	Ferrari 458 Italia GT3	586
7	A-6 Am	99	(Germany) Attempto Racing 2	(Turkey) Arkin Aka (Germany) Andreas Liehm (Germany) Bernd Kleinbach (Germany) Philipp Wlazik (Germany) Bill Barazetti	Porsche 997 GT3 R	584
8	A-6 Am	69	(United Kingdom) Gulf Racing UK	(Monaco) Roald Goethe (United Kingdom) Stuart Hall (France) Frederic Fatien (United Kingdom) Jamie Campbell-Walter	Lamborghini Gallardo LP560 GT3	582
9	997	26	(Germany) Black Falcon 4	(Denmark) Anders Fjordbach (Japan) Keita Sawa (Saudi Arabia) Saud Al Faisal (Germany) Andreas Weishaupt	Porsche 991 Cup	580
10	997	25	(Germany) Black Falcon 3	(Netherlands) Gerwin Schuring (Germany) Burkard Kaiser (Germany) Manuel Metzger (Switzerland) Christian Raubach	Porsche 991 Cup	580
11	997	7	(Bahrain) Lechner Racing Middle East	(Saudi Arabia) Fahad Algosaibi (Austria) Clemens Schmid (Austria) Klaus Bachler (Netherlands) Jaap van Lagen	Porsche 991 Cup	579
12	997	17	(France) Ruffier Racing	(France) Patrice Lafargue (France) Paul Lafargue (France) Gabriel Abergel	Porsche 991 Cup	572
13	A-6 Am	67	(San Marino) GDL racing 1	(Netherlands) Luc Braams (Netherlands) Max Braams (Netherlands) Duncan Huisman (Germany) Johannes Waimer	Mercedes SLS AMG GT3	569
14	997	45	(Poland) Förch Racing by Lukas Motorsport	(Poland) Robert Lukas (Germany) Patrick Eisemann (Germany) Steve Feige (Slovakia) Miro Konôpka (Poland) Grzegorz Moczulski	Porsche 991 Cup	568
15	A-6 Pro	10	(Russia) GT Russian Team	(Russia) Alexei Vasilyev (Estonia) Marko Asmer (United Arab Emirates) Karim Al Azhari (Estonia) Kevin Korjus	Mercedes SLS AMG GT3	566
16	A-6 Pro	18	(United Kingdom) Preci - Spark	(United Kingdom) David Jones (United Kingdom) Godfrey Jones (United Kingdom) Philip Jones (United Kingdom) Gareth Jones (United Kingdom) Morgan Jones	Mercedes SLS AMG GT3	566
17	997	47	(France) B2F compétition	(France) Benoit Fretin (France) Bruno Fretin (France) Michel Mitieus (France) Gilles Petit	Porsche 997 Cup	553
18	A-6 Am	27	(Germany) Car Collection Motorsport 2	(Germany) Tim Müller (Germany) Dirg Parhofer (Germany) Jürgen Krebs (Germany) Pierre Ehret (Germany) Norbert Pauels	Mercedes SLS AMG GT3	547
19	A-6 Am	8	(United Kingdom) Triple Eight	(United Kingdom) Lee Mowle (United Kingdom) Joe Osborne (United Kingdom) Jacques Duyver (United Kingdom) Charlie Hollings	BMW Z4 GT3	546
20	SP3	163	(United Kingdom) Optimum Motorsport	(United Kingdom) Euan Alers-Hankey (Turkey) Salih Yoluç (United Kingdom) Bradley Ellis (United Kingdom) Adrian Barwick	Ginetta G55 GT4	546
21	997	46	(Germany) MRS GT-Racing 2	(Germany) Siegfried Venema (Germany) Chris le Bon (Russia) Ilya Melnikov (United Arab Emirates) Bassam Konfli (Germany) Elia Erhart	Porsche 991 Cup	536
22	SP3	169	(United Kingdom) Speedworks Motorsport 1	(United Kingdom) Tony Hughes (United Kingdom) Ross Warburton (United Kingdom) Tom Oliphant (United Kingdom) Ollie Jackson	Ginetta G50	531
23	CUP1	76	(Germany) Racingdivas by Las Moras	(Netherlands) Liesette Braams (Netherlands) Sandra van der Sloot (Netherlands) Gaby Uljee (Germany) Maximilian Partl	BMW M235i Racing Cup	530
24	997	20	(Germany) MRS GT-Racing 1	(Switzerland) Manuel Nicolaidis (France) Olivier Baharian (France) Thierry Blaise (Taiwan) Johnson Huang (Germany) Elia Erhart	Porsche 991 Cup	530
25	A2	117	(Belgium) VDS Racing Adventures	(Belgium) Raphael van der Straten (Belgium) Gregory Paisse (Belgium) Michaël Divoy (Belgium) José Close	Honda Civic Type-R EP3	523
26	A2	86	(Germany) Besaplast Racing	(Croatia) Franjo Kovac (Sweden) Fredrik Lestrup (Germany) Kai Jordan (Germany) Henry Littig	Mini Cooper S JCW	521
27	A3T	95	(Lebanon) Memec Ogilvy Duel Racing	(United Kingdom) Ramzi Moutran (United Kingdom) Nabil Moutran (United Kingdom) Sami Moutran (United Kingdom) Phil Quaife	Seat Leon Supercopa LR	518
28	997	58	(Germany) HRT Performance 1	(Germany) Andreas Marc Riedl (Mexico) Santiago Creel (Germany) Kim Hauschild (Mexico) Oscar Arroyo	Porsche 997 Cup	518
29	SP3	170	(United Kingdom) Speedworks Motorsport 2	(United Kingdom) John Gilbert (United Kingdom) Flick Haigh (United Kingdom) Paul O'Neill (United Kingdom) Devon Modell	Aston Martin Vantage GT4	516
30	A2	111	(Czech Republic) Krenek Motorsport	(Switzerland) Wani Finkbohner (Switzerland) Stephan Peyer (Germany) Sebastian Steibel (Switzerland) Pascal Eberle	Renault Clio Cup III	515
31	A2	57	(United Arab Emirates) LAP57 Racing	(United Arab Emirates) Mohammed Al Owais (United Arab Emirates) Abdullah Al Hammadi (United Arab Emirates) Nader Zuhour (Japan) Junichi Umemoto (Sri Lanka) Rupesh Channake	Honda Integra Type R	514
32	A6-Am	96	(Malaysia) Mike Racing	(Malaysia) Michael Chua (Malaysia) Joseph Chua (Malaysia) Rick Cheang	Mercedes SLS AMG GT3	514
33	SP2	91	MARC Cars Australia 1	(Papua New Guinea) Keith Kassulke (Australia) Tony Alford (Australia) Peter Leemhuis (Australia) Duvashen Padayachee (Australia) Tarek Elgammal	MARC Focus V8	513
34	A5	75	(Germany) Hofor-Kuepperracing	(Germany) Bernd Küpper (Switzerland) Martin Kroll (Switzerland) Chantal Kroll (Switzerland) Sarah Toniutti (United States) Hal Prewitt	BMW M235i Racing Cup	511
35	CUP1	71	(Germany) Securtal Sorg Rennsport 2	(Austria) Seppi Stigler (Germany) Lars Jürgen Zander (Germany) Andreas Sczepansky (Germany) Christian Konnerth	BMW M235i Racing Cup	510
36	997	97	(Collectivity of Saint Martin) GDL racing 3	(Australia) John Iossifidis (Singapore) Lim Keong Wee (Russia) Mikhail Spiridonov (Malaysia) Melvin Moh	Porsche 991 Cup	510
37	CUP1	73	(Germany) Race-House Motorsport 2	(Germany) Dag von Garrel (United States) Stephen Perry (Switzerland) Massimiliano Girardo (Germany) Konstantin Jacoby (United Kingdom) James Cottingham	BMW M235i Racing Cup	510
38	997	87	(Collectivity of Saint Martin) GDL racing 2	(United Arab Emirates) Bashar Mardini (Hong Kong) Nigel Farmer (Singapore) Lim Keong Liam (Australia) Paul Stubber (Italy) Gianluca de Lorenzi	Porsche 997 Cup	509
39	A3T	104	(Poland) R8 Motorsport	(Poland) Adam Gladysz (Lithuania) Robertas Kupcikas (Poland) Dominik Kotarba-Majkutewicz (Luxembourg) Dylan Pereira (Poland) Marcin Jaros	Volkswagen Golf GTi	509
40	CUP1	72	(Germany) Race-House Motorsport 1	(Germany) Dag von Garrel (Monaco) Jean-Jacques Bally (France) Bruno Tortora (Madagascar) Jean-Christophe Peyre (Switzerland) Tiziano Carugati	BMW M235i Racing Cup	508
41	A6-Am	6	(Belgium) Gravity Racing International	(Belgium) Vincent Radermecker (Luxembourg) Eric Lux (Luxembourg) Gérard Lopez Fojaca (Belgium) Loris de Sordi (United Kingdom) Andy Ruhan	Mercedes SLS AMG GT3	505
42	SP3	161	(Germany) Securtal Sorg Rennsport 1	(Germany) Frank Elsässer (United Kingdom) Paul Follett (Germany) Oliver Bender (Germany) Stefan Beyer	BMW E92 M3 GT4	505
43	A2	112	(Switzerland) presenza.eu Racing Team Clio 1	(Italy) Luigi Stanco (Switzerland) Stefan Tanner (Switzerland) Stephan Jäggi (Switzerland) Marc Schelling	Renault Clio Cup Endurance	504
44	A2	126	(Denmark) Team Sally Racing	(Denmark) Martin Sally Pedersen (Denmark) Peter Obel (Denmark) Mads Christensen (Denmark) Sune Marcussen (Denmark) Jannik Larsen	Renault Clio Cup III	502
45	A2	109	(United Kingdom) APO Sport	(United Kingdom) Alex Osborne (United Kingdom) James May (Hungary) Tim Gabor (United Kingdom) Peter Venn	Renault Clio Cup	499
46	SP2	92	MARC Cars Australia 2	(United Kingdom) James Kaye (Bahrain) Amro Al-Hamad (Australia) Ryan McLeod (Australia) Tony Karanfilovski (Australia) Dean Fiore	MARC Focus V8	498
47	997	60	(Belgium) Speedlover 1	(France) Philippe Richard (Belgium) Pierre Yves Pacque (Belgium) Vincent Despriet (Belgium) Yves Noel	Porsche 991 Cup	491
48	SP2	152	(Belgium) BOUTSEN GINION RACING	(Belgium) Renaud Kuppens (France) Eric Vaissiere (France) Philippe Ulivieri (France) Daniel Waszczinski (Belgium) Christophe de Fierlant	Maserati GranTurismo	490
49	CUP1	70	(Austria) MissionPossibleBySorgRennsport	(Austria) Gustav Engljähringer (Germany) Marc Dilger (Netherlands) Mike Smit (Australia) Matt Speakman	BMW M235i Racing Cup	490
50	A2	110	(France) Autosport GP	(France) Benoit Carreras (France) Franck Traynard (France) Jerome Thiery (France) Antoine Boulay	Renault Clio IV Cup	484
51	A2	138	(United Kingdom) KPM Racing 2	(United Kingdom) Lucas Orrock (United Kingdom) Tom Wilson (Spain) Javier Morcillo (Poland) Gosia Rdest	Volkswagen Golf	482
52	A2	114	(Switzerland) presenza.eu Racing Team Clio 2	(Switzerland) Yoshiki Ohmura (Germany) Andreas Segler (Switzerland) Thomas Stockinger (Germany) Thomas Löfflad	Renault Clio Cup Endurance	482
53	A2	217	(Hong Kong) Modena Motorsport 2	(Canada) Wayne Shen (Indonesia) Michael Soeryadjaya (Netherlands) Francis Tjia (Netherlands) Marcel Tjia (Canada) Christian Chia	Renault X-85 Cup	478
54	A2	216	(Hong Kong) Modena Motorsport 1	(Canada) Wayne Shen (Canada) John Shen (Netherlands) Francis Tjia (Netherlands) Marcel Tjia (Canada) Christian Chia	Renault X-85 Cup	478
55	SP2	159	(Netherlands) Red Camel-Jordans.nl 1	(Netherlands) Rik Breukers (Netherlands) Ivo Breukers (Sweden) Tommy Lindroth (Australia) Tarek Elgammal	Audi R8	477
56	A3T	94	AllcarTuning-Racing-Team-Austria	(Austria) Michael Kogler (Austria) Tessitore (Austria) Peter Schöller	SEAT León Supercopa	476
57	A5	78	(Netherlands) JR Motorsport 2	(Netherlands) Harry Hilders (Netherlands) Gijs Bessem (Netherlands) Daan Meijer (Netherlands) Roger Grouwels	BMW E46 GTR	472
58	A2	124	(Germany) Pit Lane	(Belgium) Jacques Derenne (Belgium) "Brody" (Belgium) Kurt Dujardyn (Poland) Maciej Dreszer (Germany) Harald Rettich	Toyota GT86	462
59	997	49	(France) LE DUIGOU RACING	(Belgium) Jean-Lou Rihon (France) Rémi Terrail (Italy) Massimo Vignali (France) Jacques-André Dupuy	Porsche 997 Cup	450
60	CUP1	74	(Germany) MPB Racing Team	(Finland) Matias Henkola (Germany) Stephan Kuhs (Germany) Bernhard Henzel (Germany) Jörg Müller	BMW M235i Racing Cup	439
61	SP2	93	MARC Cars Australia 3	(Australia) Jake Camilleri (Australia) Scott Nicholas (Australia) Lindsay Kearns (Australia) Malcolm Niall	MARC Focus V8	437
62	A6-Pro	33	(Germany) SPS automotive-performance	(Germany) Valentin Pierburg (Germany) Lance David Arnold (Germany) Patrick Assenheimer (Germany) Alex Müller	Mercedes SLS AMG GT3	436
63	SP2	150	(France) GC Automobile	(France) Lionel Amrouche (France) Mathieu Pontais (Switzerland) Kurt Thiel (France) Alban Varutti	GC Automobile GC 10 V8	424
64	997	59	(Germany) HRT Performance 2	(Germany) Harald Hennes (Netherlands) Indy Dontje (France) Olivier Baron (Denmark) Kim Holmgaard (Denmark) Kasper Jensen	Porsche 997 Cup	399
65	A2	120	(Germany) frensch power motorsport	(Germany) Lisa C. Brunner (Germany) Martin Heidrich (Germany) Reinhard Nehls (Germany) Friedhelm Erlebach	Peugeot 207 RCR	392
66	SP3	167	(Italy) Nova Race 1	(Italy) Alberto Vescovi (Italy) Roberto Ferri (Italy) Roberto Gentili (United Kingdom) Henry Fletcher	Ginetta G50 GT4	391
67	997	930	(Japan) Team 930 Rush	(Japan) Yutaka Matsushima (Japan) Tomoyuki Takizawa (Japan) Yosuke Shimojima (Japan) Takeomi Mima	Porsche 997 Cup	389
68	SP3	160	(Sweden) ALFAB Racing	(Sweden) Erik Behrens (Sweden) Daniel Ros (Sweden) Henric Skoog (Sweden) Patrik Skoog	Aston Martin Vantage GT4	382
69	A6-Am	11	(Switzerland) FACH AUTO TECH 1	(Switzerland) Marcel Wagner (Switzerland) Heinz Bruder (Switzerland) Erwin Keller (Switzerland) Heinz Arnold (Italy) Matteo Cairoli	Porsche 997 GT3 R	367
70	A2	135	(Netherlands) Red Camel-Jordans.nl 2	(Austria) Klaus Kresnik (United Kingdom) Daniel Wheeler (United Kingdom) Andrew Hack (United Kingdom) Kane Astin	Seat Leon TPI	358
71	A6-Pro	12	(Switzerland) FACH AUTO TECH 2	(Germany) Otto Klohs (Austria) Martin Ragginger (Germany) Jens Richter (Germany) Sven Müller	Porsche 997 GT3 R	339
72	A5	80	(Czech Republic) RTR projects	(Czech Republic) Tomas Miniberger (Czech Republic) Michal Vitek (Belarus) Siarhei Paulavets (Czech Republic) Milan Kodídek (Czech Republic) Tomas Kwolek	BMW M3 E46 GTR	336
73	997	61	(Belgium) Speedlover 2	(Belgium) Philippe de Craene (Belgium) John de Wilde (Luxembourg) Serge Loudvig (Belgium) Patrick van Glabeke	Porsche 991 Cup	335
74	A6-Pro	19	(Netherlands) V8 Racing	(Netherlands) Ricardo Abresch (Netherlands) Alex van t'Hoff (Netherlands) Wolf Nathan (Netherlands) Nicky Pastorelli (Portugal) Miguel Ramos	Chevrolet Corvette C6R ZR1	324
75	A5	79	(Luxembourg) DUWO Racing	(Luxembourg) Jean-Marie Dumont (Luxembourg) Maurice Faber (France) Frederic Schmit (France) Thierry Chkondali (France) Nicolas Schmit	BMW M3	309
76	A5	77	(Netherlands) JR Motorsport 1	(Netherlands) Bob Herber (Netherlands) Martin Lanting (United Kingdom) Benjamin Gill (United Kingdom) Mark Jaffray	BMW E46 GTR	304
77	997	53	(Italy) Dinamic Motorsport	(Italy) Tiziano Cappelletti (Italy) Tiziano Frazza (Italy) Mario Cordoni (Italy) Piero Foglio (Italy) Roberto Rayneri	Porsche 991 Cup	291
78	SP3	162	(Austria) Niedertscheider Motorsport	(Austria) Lukas Niedertscheider (Austria) Martin Niedertscheider (Austria) Georg Steffny (Austria) Michael Fischer (Italy) Marco Maranelli	Ginetta G50 GT4	289
79	A3T	90	(Germany) Car Point S Racing Schmieglitz	(Germany) Daniel Schmieglitz (Switzerland) Cyndie Allemann (Denmark) Heino Bo Frederiksen (Germany) Axel Wiegner (Germany) Heinz Jürgen Kroner	SEAT León Supercopa	263
80	A-6 Am	115	(Denmark) Team K-Rejser	(Denmark) Jacob Kristensen (Denmark) Jan Engelbrecht (Denmark) Per Poulsen (Denmark) Claus Bertelsen (Denmark) Thomas Sørensen	Lamborghini Gallardo FL2	232
81	SP3	205	(Italy) Nova Race 2	(Italy) Luca Magnoni (Italy) Luis Scarpaccio (Italy) Fabio Ghizzi (Italy) Matteo Cressoni	Ginetta G50 GT4	183
82	A6-Am	22	(Germany) Leipert Motorsport	(France) Jean-Charles Perrin (Germany) Harold Schlotter (United Kingdom) Adrian Watt (Austria) Reinhard Kofler (Austria) Ernst Kirchmayr	Lamborghini Gallardo FL2	156
83	A3T	98	(United Kingdom) WEC Motorsport	(United Kingdom) David Cox (United Kingdom) Gavin Spencer (United Kingdom) Frank Pettitt (United Kingdom) Jason Cox (United Kingdom) Michael Cox	SEAT León Supercopa	124
84	A6-Am	5	(Germany) Car Collection Motorsport 1	(Germany) Peter Schmidt (Germany) Heinz Schmersal (Germany) Johannes Siegler (Liechtenstein) Patrik Kaiser (Germany) Ingo Vogler	Mercedes SLS AMG GT3	94
85	A6-Pro	3	(United Arab Emirates) Abu Dhabi Racing Black Falcon	(United Arab Emirates) Khaled Al Qubaisi (Netherlands) Jeroen Bleekemolen (Germany) Bernd Schneider (Sweden) Andreas Simonsen	Mercedes SLS AMG GT3	88
86	A3T	54	(United Arab Emirates) K&K Racing Team & Valek Autosport	(Czech Republic) Marcel Kusin (Czech Republic) Petr Vallek	BMW 130i	86
87	A6-Pro	1	(Switzerland) Stadler Motorsport	(Switzerland) Mark Ineichen (Switzerland) Rolf Ineichen (Switzerland) Adrian Amstutz (Germany) Christian Engelhart	Porsche 997 GT3 R	61
88	A6-Pro	9	(Switzerland) Hofor-Racing	(Switzerland) Michael Kroll (Germany) Kenneth Heyer (Netherlands) Christiaan Frankenhout (Switzerland) Roland Eggimann (Germany) Roland Rehfeld	Mercedes SLS AMG GT3	23
89	A2	48	(United Arab Emirates) Zettanet Racing Team	(Republic of Ireland) Jonathan Mullan (Pakistan) Umair Khan (Australia) Gerald McLeod (United Kingdom) Graham Davidson	Honda DC5	16
