= 2014 Dubai 24 Hour =

Seasons
- ← 2013 2015 →

The layout of the Dubai Autodrome.

The 2014 Dunlop 24H Dubai was the 9th running of the Dubai 24 Hour endurance race. It took place at the Dubai Autodrome in Dubai, United Arab Emirates, and ran between 10–11 January 2014.

== Race result ==
Class Winners in bold.

| Pos | Class | No | Team | Drivers | Car | Laps |
|---|---|---|---|---|---|---|
| 1 | **A6-Pro** | **20** | **(Switzerland) Stadler Motorsport** | **(Switzerland) Adrian Amstutz (Germany) Christian Engelhart (Switzerland) Mark Ineichen (Switzerland) Rolf Ineichen (Switzerland) Marcel Matter** | **Porsche 997 GT3-R** | **603** |
| 2 | A6-Pro | 38 | (Germany) ALL-INKL.COM Münnich Motorsport | (Germany) Marc Basseng (United Kingdom) Rob Huff (Germany) René Münnich | Mercedes-Benz SLS AMG GT3 | 600 |
| 3 | A6-Pro | 2 | (Germany) Black Falcon | (United Arab Emirates) Khaled Al Qubaisi (Netherlands) Jeroen Bleekemolen (Saudi Arabia) Abdulaziz Al Faisal (Germany) Hubert Haupt (United Kingdom) Adam Christodoulou | Mercedes-Benz SLS AMG GT3 | 597 |
| 4 | A6-Pro | 458 | (Germany) GT Corse | (Germany) Alexander Mattschull (Germany) Marco Seefried (Germany) Pierre Ehret (Germany) Pierre Kaffer (Russia) Vadim Kogay | Ferrari 458 Italia GT3 | 593 |
| 5 | A6-Pro | 21 | (Netherlands) V8 Racing | (Netherlands) Wolf Nathan (Netherlands) Danny Werkman (Netherlands) Rick Abresch (Netherlands) Alex van 't Hoff (Netherlands) Nicky Pastorelli | Chevrolet Corvette C6.R | 592 |
| 6 | A6-Pro | 27 | (Germany) Walkenhorst Motorsport | (Germany) Henry Walkenhorst (Germany) Ralf Oeverhaus (Austria) Daniela Schmid (Germany) Jens Richter (Germany) Claudia Hürtgen | BMW Z4 GT3 | 591 |
| 7 | **A6-Am** | **888** | **(United Arab Emirates) Dragon Racing** | **(South Africa) Jordan Grogor (Kuwait) Khaled Al Mudhaf (Saudi Arabia) Mohammed Jawa (Ivory Coast) Frédéric Fatien** | **Ferrari 458 Italia GT3** | **586** |
| 8 | A6-Am | 10 | (Germany) rhino's Leipert Motorsport | (United Kingdom) Oliver Webb (Spain) Isaac Tutumlu (Czech Republic) Jan Stovicek (Japan) Yoshiharu Mori (Netherlands) Jeroen Mul | Lamborghini Gallardo GT3 | 586 |
| 9 | A6-Am | 14 | (Switzerland) Spirit of Race | (Portugal) Filipe Barreiros (United Kingdom) Harinder Dhillon (France) Erik Maris (United Kingdom) Aaron Scott (Russia) Ilya Melnikov | Ferrari 458 Italia GT3 | 584 |
| 10 | A6-Pro | 76 | (Germany) SX Team Schubert | (Canada) Paul Dalla Lana (United States) Bill Auberlen (United States) Dane Cameron (Germany) Dirk Werner (Germany) Claudia Hürtgen | BMW Z4 GT3 | 583 |
| 11 | A6-Pro | 66 | (Germany) Attempto Racing | (Germany) Jürgen Häring (Greece) Dimitros Konstantinou (Germany) Tim Müller (Germany) Dominic Jöst (Switzerland) Fabian Thuner | Porsche 997 GT3-R | 583 |
| 12 | A6-Pro | 17 | (Hong Kong) Craft Racing AMR | (Hong Kong) Frank Yu (United Kingdom) Richard Lyons (France) Jean-Marc Merlin (Japan) Keita Sawa (Hong Kong) Darryl O'Young | Aston Martin V12 Vantage GT3 | 581 |
| 13 | **997** | **42** | **(Poland) Förch Racing by Lukas Motorsport** | **(Poland) Robert Lukas (Mexico) Christofer Berckhan Ramirez (Poland) Andrzej Lewandowski (Poland) Stefan Bilinski** | **Porsche 997 Cup** | **578** |
| 14 | 997 | 44 | (Germany) Black Falcon | (Switzerland) Arturo Devigus (Denmark) Anders Fjordbach (Germany) Willi Friedrichs (Germany) Burkard Kaiser (Russia) Vladimir Lunkin | Porsche 997 Cup | 574 |
| 15 | A6-Am | 11 | (Germany) Car Collection Motorsport | (Germany) Heinz Schmersal (Germany) Johannes Siegler (Germany) Klaus Koch (Germany) Johannes Kirchhoff (Germany) Gustav Edelhoff | Mercedes-Benz SLS AMG GT3 | 571 |
| 16 | A6-Pro | 4 | (Switzerland) FACH AUTO TECH | (Germany) Otto Klohs (Austria) Martin Ragginger (Germany) Sebastian Asch (United States) Connor De Phillippi | Porsche 997 GT3-R | 565 |
| 17 | A6-Pro | 30 | (United Kingdom) Ram Racing | (United Kingdom) Johnny Mowlem (Republic of Ireland) Matt Griffin (India) Cheerag Arya (Denmark) Jan Magnussen | Ferrari 458 Italia GT3 | 564 |
| 18 | A6-Pro | 9 | (France) Crubilé Sport | (France) François Perrodo (France) Sébastien Crubilé (France) Emmanuel Collard (France) Matthieu Vaxivière | Porsche 997 GT3-R | 557 |
| 19 | 997 | 45 | (Germany) Car Collection Motorsport | (Germany) Peter Schmidt (Germany) Ingo Vogler (Germany) Wolfgang Kemper (Slovakia) Miro Konôpka (Germany) Sebastian Kemper | Porsche 997 Cup S | 554 |
| 20 | 997 | 40 | (San Marino) GDL Racing | (United Arab Emirates) Bashar Mardini (Australia) Paul Stubber (Australia) Ray Stubber (Hong Kong) Nigel Farmer | Porsche 997 Cup S | 546 |
| 21 | 997 | 33 | (Germany) Attempto Racing | (Russia) Nikolay Gryazin (Russia) Alexey Veremenko (Russia) Sergey Borisov (Russia) Ivan Samarin (Russia) Vasily Gryazin | Porsche 997 Cup | 546 |
| 22 | **A5** | **62** | **(Netherlands) JR Motorsport** | **(Netherlands) Harry Hilders (Netherlands) Roger Grouwels (Netherlands) Gijs Bessem (Netherlands) Koen Bogaerts (Lithuania) Dziugas Tovilavi** | **BMW E46 GTR** | **538** |
| 23 | **SP3** | **164** | **(United Kingdom) Speedworks Motorsport** | **(United Kingdom) Tony Hughes (United Kingdom) Christian Dick (United Kingdom) Ross Warburton (United Kingdom) Will Scully** | **Ginetta G50** | **522** |
| 24 | SP3 | 155 | (Denmark) Perfection Racing Europe | (Sweden) Erik Behrens (Denmark) Kim Holmgaard (Denmark) Michael Klostermann (Sweden) Micael Ljungström (Denmark) Kasper H. Jensen | Aston Martin V8 Vantage GT4 | 520 |
| 25 | **SP2** | **123** | **(United Kingdom) Nissan GT Academy Team RJN** | **(Spain) Lucas Ordóñez (Portugal) Miguel Faísca (Germany) Florian Strauss (Russia) Stanislav Aksenov (United States) Nickolas McMillen** | **Nissan 370Z** | **513** |
| 26 | SP3 | 150 | (Netherlands) Red Camel - Jordans.nl | (Lebanon) Yusif Bassil (Australia) Jonathan Venter (Papua New Guinea) Keith Kassulke (Luxembourg) Maurice Faber | Audi R8 | 512 |
| 27 | A5 | 156 | (Germany) Black Falcon | (Netherlands) Gerwin Schuring (Netherlands) Philip Dries (Germany) Christian von Rieff (Germany) Helmut Weber | Porsche 991 Carrera | 511 |
| 28 | A6-Am | 19 | (San Marino) GDL Racing | (Netherlands) Luc Braams (Netherlands) Duncan Huisman (Netherlands) Ivo Breukers (Italy) Gianluca de Lorenzi | Mercedes-Benz SLS AMG GT3 | 507 |
| 29 | **A2** | **106** | **(Denmark) AD Racing / K-Rejser** | **(Denmark) Jan Engelbrecht (Denmark) Martin Clausen (Denmark) Jacob Kristensen (Denmark) Jan Seerup** | **Renault Clio Sport** | **506** |
| 30 | 997 | 96 | (Australia) Motorsport Services / STR | (Australia) Malcolm Niall (Australia) Nathan Callaghan (Australia) Brett Niall (Australia) Mark Pilatti | Porsche 997 Cup | 503 |
| 31 | **A3T** | **90** | **(Netherlands) Racingdivas Team Schubert** | **(Netherlands) Natasja Smit-Sø (Netherlands) Gaby Uljee (Netherlands) Sandra van der Sloot (Netherlands) Paulien Zwart (Netherlands) Shirley van der Lof** | **BMW 320d** | **496** |
| 32 | A5 | 61 | (Germany) Sorg Rennsport | (Germany) Benjamin Sorg (Germany) Stephan Kuhs (Denmark) Roland Poulsen (Germany) Harald Schlotter (Denmark) Jacques Møller | BMW M3 E46 | 494 |
| 33 | A3T | 47 | (New Zealand) Motorsport Services | (Australia) Danny Stutterd (United Kingdom) Ricky Coomber (New Zealand) Aaron Harris (United Kingdom) Devon Modell | SEAT León Supercopa | 493 |
| 34 | A3T | 97 | Prefa Racing Team Austria | (Austria) Michael Kogler (Austria) Josef Rittner (Austria) Roland Frisch (Austria) Martin Niedertscheider | SEAT León Supercopa | 493 |
| 35 | **D1** | **125** | **(Belgium) Recy Racing Team** | **(Belgium) Jan De Vocht (Belgium) Johan Van Loo (Belgium) Steffen Schlichenmeier (Belgium) Wim Meulders (Belgium) Thomas Piessens** | **BMW 120d** | **490** |
| 36 | SP2 | 136 | (Luxembourg) Gravity Racing International | (Belgium) Vincent Radermecker (Luxembourg) Eric Lux (Luxembourg) Gérard Lopez (United Kingdom) Andy Ruhan (Belgium) Loris de Sordi | Mosler MT900 GT3 | 488 |
| 37 | 997 | 41 | (San Marino) GDL Racing | (Switzerland) Kurt Thiel (Australia) Robert Thomson (Australia) John Iossifidis (Germany) Marco Schelp | Porsche 997 Cup S | 488 |
| 38 | A2 | 107 | (Denmark) AD Racing | (Denmark) Mads Pedersen (Denmark) Niels Nyboe (Denmark) Frederik Nymark (Denmark) Steffen Petersen (Denmark) Ole Klitgaard | Renault Clio Sport | 487 |
| 39 | A2 | 108 | (United Kingdom) APO Sport | (United Kingdom) Alex Osborne (United Kingdom) James May (Switzerland) Stephan Peyer (Switzerland) Wani Finkbohner | Renault Clio Sport | 481 |
| 40 | SP3 | 159 | (Germany) Bonk Motorsport | (Germany) Jörg Hatscher (Germany) Ralf Oeverhaus (Germany) Michael Bonk (Germany) Max Partl (Netherlands) Liesette Braams | BMW M3 GT4 | 480 |
| 41 | A3T | 86 | (Poland) Förch Racing by Lukas Motorsport | (Germany) Steve Feige (Poland) Jaroslaw Budzynski (Poland) Rafal Mikrut (Poland) Grzegorz Moczulski (Poland) Bartosz Opiola | Volkswagen Golf GTI | 480 |
| 42 | A2 | 216 | (Hong Kong) Modena Motorsports | (Netherlands) Francis Tjia (Canada) Wayne Shen (Netherlands) Marcel Tjia (Canada) John Shen (Canada) Christian Chia | Renault Clio X-85 Cup | 477 |
| 43 | D1 | 127 | (United Kingdom) KPM Racing | (United Kingdom) Josh Caygill (United Kingdom) Paul White (United Kingdom) Aaron Mason (Spain) Javier Morcillo (United Kingdom) Tom Onslow-Cole | Volkswagen Golf TDI Mk6 | 476 |
| 44 | D1 | 121 | (Netherlands) Red Camel - Jordans.nl | (Austria) Klaus Kresnik (United Kingdom) Kane Astin (United Kingdom) Daniel Wheeler (United Kingdom) Andrew Hack | SEAT León TDI | 470 |
| 45 | A2 | 57 | (United Arab Emirates) LAP57 Racing Team | (United Arab Emirates) Mohammed Al Owais (Pakistan) Umair Ahmed Khan (United Arab Emirates) Abdullah Al Hammadi (Japan) Junichi Umemoto (Jordan) Nadir Zuhour | Honda Integra (fourth generation) | 470 |
| 46 | SP3 | 152 | (United Kingdom) Optimum Motorsport | (United Kingdom) Lee Mowle (United Kingdom) Joe Osborne (United Kingdom) Gary Simms (United Kingdom) Jake Rattenbury | Ginetta G50 | 454 |
| 47 | D1 | 122 | (United Arab Emirates) SVDP Racing | (South Africa) Kris Budnik (United Arab Emirates) Spencer Vanderpal (Netherlands) Wubbe Herlaar (United Kingdom) Jason O'Keefe (Australia) Christopher Wishart | BMW 120d | 442 |
| 48 | SP2 | 126 | (United Kingdom) Nissan GT Academy Team RJN | (Spain) Lucas Ordóñez (South Africa) Ashley Oldfield (Thailand) Tor Graves (Australia) James Moffat (India) Karun Chandhok | Nissan 370Z | 440 |
| 49 | A6-Pro | 1 | (United Arab Emirates) Team Abu Dhabi by Black Falcon | (United Arab Emirates) Khaled Al Quabaisi (Netherlands) Jeroen Bleekemolen (Germany) Bernd Schneider (Sweden) Andreas Simonsen | Mercedes-Benz SLS AMG GT3 | 431 |
| 50 | D1 | 128 | (Netherlands) Cor Euser Racing | (United States) Hal Prewitt (Netherlands) Frank Nebig (United States) Andrew Baxter (Netherlands) Richard Verburg (India) Prashanth Tharani | BMW 120d | 418 |
| 51 | A3T | 89 | (Lebanon) Memac Ogilvy Duel Racing | (United Kingdom) Ramzi Moutran (United Kingdom) Sami Moutran (United Kingdom) Nabil Moutran (United Kingdom) Phil Quaife | SEAT León Supercopa LR | 417 |
| 52 | A2 | 137 | (Belgium) VDS Racing Adventures | (Belgium) Raphaël van der Straten (Belgium) Joël Vanloocke (Belgium) Gaël Frere (Belgium) Marc Hallaert (Belgium) José Close | Honda Civic | 395 |
| 53 | A5 | 64 | (Czech Republic) RTR Projects | (Czech Republic) Tomas Miniberger (Czech Republic) Michal Vitek (Belarus) Sergej Paulavets (Czech Republic) Milan Kodidek (Czech Republic) Jan Cervenka | BMW M3 E46 GTR | 391 |
| 54 | A5 | 78 | (Germany) Hofor-Kuepperracing | (Germany) Bernd Küpper (Switzerland) Michael Kroll (Switzerland) Chantal Kroll (Switzerland) Martin Kroll (Switzerland) Roland Eggimann | BMW E46 Coupe | 375 |
| 55 | SP2 | 144 | (France) GC Automobile Factory | (France) Eric Vaissière (France) Philippe Ulivieri (France) Jérôme de la Chapelle (France) Lionel Amrouche (France) Alban Varutti | GC Automobile GC-10 V8 | 372 |
| 56 | 997 | 49 | (Belgium) Speedlover | (Belgium) Jean-Michel Gérome (Luxembourg) Christian Kelders (Luxembourg) Carlos Rivas (Czech Republic) Vladimir Hladik | Porsche 997 Cup | 368 |
| 57 | A3T | 95 | (Germany) Pfister-Racing GmbH | (Germany) Andreas Pfister (Switzerland) Patrick Wolf (Switzerland) Toni Büeler (Germany) Christian Kranenberg (Russia) Mikhail Maleev | SEAT León Supercopa | 352 |
| 58 | SP3 | 154 | (Italy) NOVA RACE | (Italy) Luca Magnoni (Italy) Luis Daniel Scarpaccio (Italy) Fabio Ghizzi (Italy) Maurizio Copetti (Italy) Roberto Gentili | Ginetta G50 | 344 |
| 59 | SP2 | 12 | (Netherlands) Manor MP Motorsport | (Netherlands) Bert de Heus (Netherlands) Daniël de Jong (Netherlands) Leon Rijnbeek | Dodge Viper Competition Coupe | 344 |
| 60 | A6-Am | 3 | (Switzerland) FACH AUTO TECH | (Switzerland) Marcel Wagner (Switzerland) Thomas Fleischer (Switzerland) Heinz Arnold (Switzerland) Marco Zolin (Switzerland) Heinz Bruder | Porsche 997 GT3-R | 342 |
| 61 | A6-Am | 18 | (France) VISIOM | (France) Jean-Paul Pagny (France) Thierry Perrier (France) Jean-Bernard Bouvet (France) Benjamin Roy | Ferrari F458GT (Vdev1) | 336 |
| 62 | A6-Am | 88 | (United Arab Emirates) Dragon Racing | (United Kingdom) Rob Barff (United Kingdom) Dan Norris-Jones (United Kingdom) Stuart Hall (Canada) Bassam Kronfli | Ferrari 458 Italia GT3 | 332 |
| 63 | SP2 | 140 | (Belgium) Boutsen Ginion Racing | (Belgium) Christophe de Fierlant (Italy) Massimo Vignali (Belgium) Renaud Kuppens | Renault Mégane Trophy | 331 |
| 64 | A6-Am | 28 | (United Kingdom) Team LNT | (United Kingdom) Lawrence Tomlinson (United Kingdom) Mike Simpson (United Kingdom) Paul White (Spain) Javier Morcillo (United Kingdom) Adam Sharpe | Ginetta G55 GT3 | 314 |
| 65 | A6-Pro | 99 | (Germany) Attempto Racing | (Germany) Bernd Kleinbach (Germany) Andreas Liehm (Turkey) Arkin Aka (Spain) Alex Riberas (Germany) Johannes Waimer | Porsche 997 GT3-R | 305 |
| 66 | 997 | 50 | (Belgium) Speedlover | (Belgium) Pierre-Yves Paque (France) Philippe Richard (France) Boris Derichebourg (France) Victor Rodrigues | Porsche 997 Cup | 281 |
| 67 | A5 | 77 | (Luxembourg) DUWO RACING | (Luxembourg) Jean-Marie Dumont (France) Frédéric Schmit (France) Thierry Chkondali (France) Nicolas Schmit (Sweden) Freddy Nordström | BMW M3 | 223 |
| 68 | A6-Pro | 5 | (Switzerland) Spirit of Race | (Belarus) Alexander Talkanitsa, Sr. (Belarus) Alexander Talkanitsa, Jr. (Italy) Gianmaria Bruni (Finland) Toni Vilander | Ferrari 458 Italia GT3 | 193 |
| 69 | 997 | 46 | (Germany) MRS GT-Racing | (Hong Kong) Samson Chan (Russia) Rinat Salikhov (Netherlands) Maximiliaan Braams (Netherlands) Patrick Huisman (Taiwan) George Chou | Porsche 997 Cup | 150 |
| 70 | A2 | 109 | (Germany) Racing 4 Friends | (Germany) Steven Fürsch (Austria) Thomas Wolf (Germany) Friedhelm Erlebach (Germany) Henry Littig | Mini JCW Endurance | 102 |
| 71 | SP2 | 142 | (France) GC Automobile Factory | (France) Philippe Cimadomo (Belgium) Jean-Pierre Lequeux (France) Franck Leone Provost (France) Christophe Cappelli | GC Automobile GC-10 V8 | 90 |
| 72 | A5 | 43 | (Germany) Sorg Rennsport | (United Kingdom) Paul Follett (Netherlands) Marco van der Knaap (Netherlands) Henk Thijssen (Germany) Daniel Sorg (Germany) Lars Zander | BMW Z4M Coupe | 85 |
| 73 | 997 | 163 | (United Kingdom) Team Parker Racing Ltd | (United Kingdom) Ian Loggie (United Kingdom) Chris Jones (United Kingdom) Jules Westwood (United Kingdom) Richard Plant | Porsche 997 Cup | 81 |
| 74 | A6-Pro | 7 | (Hong Kong) Craft Racing AMR | (Germany) Stefan Mücke (United Kingdom) Darren Turner (Japan) Tomonobu Fujii (Hong Kong) Darryl O'Young (Hong Kong) Frank Yu | Aston Martin V12 Vantage GT3 | 62 |
| 75 | A3T | 98 | (United Kingdom) Grove & Dean Motorsport | (United Kingdom) Gavin Spencer (United Kingdom) Frank Pettitt (United Kingdom) Carey Lewis (United Kingdom) Brett Woodman | SEAT León Supercopa | 38 |
| 76 | SP3 | 162 | (Netherlands) Cor Euser Racing | (United States) Hal Prewitt (United States) Vic Rice (United States) Shane Lewis (Netherlands) Richard Verburg (Netherlands) Cor Euser | Lotus Evora GT4 | 23 |
| 77 | A2 | 110 | (Qatar) QMMF | (Qatar) Saif Al Naemi (United Arab Emirates) Abbas Al Alawi (Qatar) Hamad Saeed Al-Asam (Qatar) Abdulaziz Abdulla (Qatar) Abdulla Al Kharaan | Suzuki Swift | 1 |
| DNS | SP2 | 15 | (Belgium) AF Racing International | (South Africa) Charl Arangies (France) Emmanuel Toulisse (United Kingdom) Andrew Ray (Denmark) Jannik Larsen (Czech Republic) Matheus Svoboda | Lamborghini Gallardo GT3 | |
| DNS | SP2 | 143 | (France) GC Automobile Factory | (Canada) Jean-Charles Perrin (Russia) Lev Fridman (Luxembourg) Jean-Christophe Montant (France) Christian Philippon | GC Automobile GC-10 V8 | |
