= 2012 Dubai 24 Hour =

Seasons
- ← 2011 2013 →

The layout of the Dubai Autodrome.

The 2012 Dunlop Dubai 24 Hour was the 7th running of the Dubai 24 Hour endurance race. It took place at the Dubai Autodrome between January 13–14, 2012.

== Race result ==
Class Winners in bold.

Pos	Class	No	Team	Drivers	Car	Laps
1	**A6**	**3**	**(United Arab Emirates) Abu Dhabi by Black Falcon**	**(United Arab Emirates) Khaled Al Qubaisi (United Kingdom) Sean Edwards (Netherlands) Jeroen Bleekemolen (Germany) Thomas Jäger**	**Mercedes-Benz SLS AMG GT3**	**628**
2	A6	6	(Germany) Heico Motorsport	(Sweden) Max Nilsson (Netherlands) Christiaan Frankenhout (Germany) Maximilian Buhk (Germany) Bernd Schneider (Austria) Andreas Zuber	Mercedes-Benz SLS AMG GT3	626
3	A6	16	(Germany) Heico Motorsport	(Germany) Bernd Schneider (Germany) Kenneth Heyer (Sweden) Andreas Simonsen (Venezuela) Rodolfo González	Mercedes-Benz SLS AMG GT3	625
4	A6	1	(Saudi Arabia) Saudi Falcons by Schubert	(Saudi Arabia) Abdulaziz Al Faisal (Saudi Arabia) Faisal Binladen (Sweden) Edward Sandström (Germany) Jörg Müller (Germany) Claudia Hürtgen	BMW Z4 GT3	625
5	A6	18	(Switzerland) FACH AUTO TECH	(Germany) Otto Klohs (Switzerland) Heinz Bruder (Switzerland) Carlo Lusser (Austria) Martin Ragginger (Germany) Swen Dolenc	Porsche 997 GT3-R	615
6	A6	20	(Switzerland) Stadler Motorsport	(Switzerland) Mark Ineichen (Switzerland) Rolf Ineichen (Switzerland) Adrian Amstutz (Switzerland) Marcel Matter	Porsche 997 GT3-R	611
7	A6	15	(Luxembourg) Gravity Charouz Racing	(Belgium) Vincent Radermecker (Belgium) Loris de Sordi (Luxembourg) Eric Lux (Luxembourg) Gérard Lopez (Czech Republic) Tomáš Enge	Mercedes-Benz SLS AMG GT3	611
8	A6	25	(Germany) Reiter Engineering	(Netherlands) Nico Pronk (Netherlands) Peter Kox (Germany) Bernhard Müller (Netherlands) Dennis Retera	Lamborghini Gallardo LP600	594
9	A6	29	(Germany) Rhino's Leipert Motorsport	(Germany) Tobias Neuser (France) Jean-Marc Merlin (Czech Republic) Jan Stovicek (Finland) Mika Vähämäki (Germany) Marcel Leipert	Lamborghini Gallardo LP600	575
10	A6	38	(Germany) MRS GT-Racing	(Germany) Erwin Stückle (Austria) Philipp Eng (United States) Will Langhorne (Germany) Klaus-Dieter Frers	Porsche 997 GT3-R	571
11	A6	22	(Ukraine) Tsunami RT	(Ukraine) Oleksandr Gaidai (Ukraine) Andrii Kruglyk (Russia) Aleksei Basov (Italy) Gianluca de Lorenzi	Porsche 997 GT3 Cup	568
12	A6	21	(Germany) CC Car Collection	(Germany) Peter Schmidt (Germany) Klaus Koch (Germany) Josef Klüber (Switzerland) Alain Bürgin	Porsche 997 GT3 Cup	567
13	A6	17	(Switzerland) FACH AUTO TECH	(Switzerland) Marco Zolin (Switzerland) Daniel Allemann (Switzerland) Andrina Gugger (Austria) Martin Ragginger (Germany) Swen Dolenc	Porsche 997 GT3-R	563
14	**SP3**	**116**	**(United Kingdom) Optimum Motorsport**	**(United Kingdom) Lee Mowle (United Kingdom) Joe Osborne (United Kingdom) Gary Simms (United Kingdom) George Murrells**	**Ginetta G50**	**560**
15	A6	11	(Germany) CC Car Collection	(Germany) Heinz Schmersal (Germany) Johannes Kirchhoff (Germany) Gustav Edelhoff (Germany) Elmar Grimm (Germany) Wolfgang Kemper	Porsche 997 GT3 Cup S	550
16	**SP2**	**103**	**(Netherlands) Las Moras Racing Team**	**(Netherlands) Luc Braams (Netherlands) Ronald Morien (Netherlands) Duncan Huisman (United Kingdom) Michael Munemann**	**Renault Megane Trophy**	**550**
17	**997**	**41**	**(Netherlands) Carworld Motorsport**	**(Belgium) Steve Matthyssen (France) Philippe Richard (Netherlands) Roger Grouwels (United Kingdom) Robert Nearn**	**Porsche 997 GT3 Cup**	**550**
18	SP3	23	(Germany) Black Falcon Team TMD Friction	(Germany) Christian von Rieff (Switzerland) Christian Raubach (Luxembourg) Steve Jans (Germany) Michael Pflüger (Germany) Manuel Metzger	BMW M3 GT4	549
19	A6	36	(United States) United Autosports	(Venezuela) Enzo Potolicchio (Venezuela) Alex Popow (United Kingdom) Ryan Dalziel	Audi R8 LMS	548
20	A6	99	(Germany) Attempto Racing	(Germany) Jürgen Häring (Denmark) Nicki Thiim (Germany) Chris Bauer (Germany) Arkin Aka (Austria) Sven Heyrowsky	Porsche 997 GT3-R	547
21	A6	28	(France) Exagon Engineering	(France) Daniel Desbrueres (France) Catherine Desbrueres (Belgium) Christian Kelders (France) Maurice Gouteyron	Porsche 997 GT3-R	543
22	SP3	106	(France) GC Automobile	(Germany) Günther Deutsch (Germany) Marco Deutsch (France) Gérard Bonjean (Belgium) Jean-Pierre Lequeux (Switzerland) Kurt Thiel	GC Automobile GC10.2-V6	541
23	SP3	118	(Italy) Nova Race Arancio	(Italy) Tiziano Frazza (Italy) Luca Magnoni (Italy) Luis Scarpaccio (Italy) Matteo Cressoni (Italy) Piero Foglio	Ginetta G50	539
24	SP2	27	(Belgium) VDS Racing Adventures	(Belgium) Raphaël van der Straten (Belgium) Benjamin Bailly (Belgium) Julien Schroyen (Belgium) Stéphane Lémeret (Germany) Karim Al Azhari	Ford Mustang GT3	537
25	**A2**	**80**	**(Germany) Besaplast Racing Team**	**(Croatia) Franjo Kovac (Germany) Martin Tschornia (Germany) Cora Schumacher (Sweden) Fredrik Lestrup (Germany) Reinhard Nehls**	**BMW Mini**	**533**
26	SP2	100	(United Kingdom) RJN Motorsport	(Spain) Lucas Ordóñez (France) Jordan Tresson (United States) Bryan Heitkotter (United Kingdom) Jann Mardenborough	Nissan 370Z	532
27	A2	57	(United Arab Emirates) LAP57 Racing Team	(United Arab Emirates) Mohammed Al Owais (Pakistan) Umair Ahmed Khan (Sri Lanka) Rupesh Channake (United Arab Emirates) Saeed Al Mehairi (United Arab Emirates) Omran Al Owais	Honda Integra Type R	532
28	997	40	(Germany) Besaplast Racing Team	(Croatia) Franjo Kovac (Germany) Martin Tschornia (Germany) Roland Asch (Germany) Sebastian Asch (Germany) Stephanie Halm	Porsche 997 GT3 Cup	529
29	A6	26	(United States) United Autosports	(Hong Kong) Frank Yu (United Kingdom) Matthew Bell (United States) Mark Patterson (New Zealand) Roger Wills	Audi R8 LMS	525
30	SP3	125	(Germany) Hamburg Racing	(Germany) Kim André Hauschild (Germany) Karl Pflanz (United States) Vic Rice (United States) Shane Lewis	Aston Martin Vantage N24	513
31	A2	81	(Germany) S.I.G. Motorsport	(Germany) Max Partl (Germany) Friedhelm Erlebach (Germany) Henry Littig (Switzerland) Rolf Plattner	BMW Mini Cooper S Works	503
32	SP3	63	(Australia) Racer Industries	(Australia) Ryan McLeod (Australia) Jake Camilleri (Australia) Scott Nicholas (United Kingdom) James Kaye	Holden Astra VX-R	501
33	SP3	121	(Germany) Bonk Motorsport	(Germany) Henry Walkenhorst (Germany) Christian Moers (Germany) Axel Burghardt (New Zealand) Guy Stewart	BMW M3 GT4	499
34	SP3	117	(Italy) Nova Race Bianco	(Italy) Tiziano Cappelletti (Belgium) Pierre Piron (Italy) Marco Cassera (Italy) Paolo Alberto Necchi (Italy) Alessandro Bonacini	Ginetta G50	497
35	**A5**	**51**	**(France) Le Duigou Racing**	**(France) Jean-Paul Pagny (France) Benoît Fretin (France) Bruno Fretin (France) Eric Vincenot (France) Jean-Marc Bachelier**	**BMW 130i Cup**	**495**
36	A5	50	(Germany) Kuepperracing	(Germany) Bernd Küpper (Switzerland) Michael Kroll (Switzerland) Chantal Kroll (Switzerland) Martin Kroll (Switzerland) Raffi Bader	BMW E46 Coupe	487
37	SP3	122	(Turkey) Borusan Otomotiv	(Turkey) Aytaç Biter (Turkey) Kaan Gürgenç (Turkey) Ertan Nacaroglu (Turkey) Ibrahim Okyay (Turkey) Yadel Oskan	BMW M3	486
38	SP3	120	(United Kingdom) RJN Motorsport	(Japan) Tetsuya Tanaka (United Arab Emirates) Humaid Al Masaood (United States) Bryan Heitkotter (United Kingdom) Jann Mardenborough (United Kingdom) Richard Meaden	Nissan 370Z GT4	468
39	A2	84	(Netherlands) Racingdivas.nl	(Netherlands) Liesette Braams (Netherlands) Sheila Verschuur (Netherlands) Paulien Zwart (Netherlands) Sandra van der Sloot (Netherlands) Gaby Uljee	Renault Clio RS Cup	467
40	A6	14	(Italy) Autorlando Sport	(Italy) Mario Cordoni (Italy) Diego Romanini (Italy) Tommaso Rocca (Italy) Alessandro Garofano (Italy) Roberto Raineri	Porsche 997 GT3-R	463
41	A6	10	(Poland) Förch Racing	(Poland) Robert Lukas (Germany) Philipp Wlazik (Slovakia) Stefan Rosina	Porsche 997 GT3 Cup	459
42	A6	5	(Saudi Arabia) Saudi Falcons by Schubert	(Saudi Arabia) Faisal Binladen (Saudi Arabia) Bandar Alesayi (Germany) Marko Hartung (Saudi Arabia) Fahad Al Gosaibi	BMW Z4 GT3	444
43	SP3	54	(Netherlands) JR Motorsport	(Netherlands) Bert van der Zweerde (Netherlands) Harry Hilders (Netherlands) Marco Poland (Netherlands) Pieter van Soelen	BMW E46 GTR	435
44	A2	85	(Netherlands) Equipe Verschuur	(Hong Kong) Keith Chan (Hong Kong) Jonathan Hui (Macau) Kevin Wing (Hong Kong) Eric Lo (Hong Kong) Byron Tong	Renault Clio RS Cup	422
45	SP2	101	(United Kingdom) GT3 Racing	(United Kingdom) Craig Wilkins (United Kingdom) Andy Ruhan (United Kingdom) Leigh Smart (United Kingdom) Aaron Scott	Dodge Viper Competition Coupe	421
46	A2	83	(Thailand) The Pizza Company Racing	(Denmark) Thomas Raldorf (Thailand) Ekarat Wihawatprapa (Denmark) Niels Borum (Thailand) Pisanu Sirimongkolkasem (Denmark) Jakob Borum	Honda Integra (fourth generation)	416
47	A2	131	(Netherlands) Marcos Racing	(United States) Hal Prewitt (United Kingdom) Paul Follett (Netherlands) Richard Verburg (France) Yves Junne (United Kingdom) Peter Morris	BMW 120d	412
48	SP3	61	(United Arab Emirates) Duel Racing	(United Kingdom) Ramzi Moutran (United Kingdom) Nabil Moutran (United Kingdom) Sami Moutran (Bahrain) Salman Bin Rashid Al-Khalifa	SEAT Leon Super Copa	409
49	A6	46	(Belgium) Speedlover	(Belgium) Jean-Michel Gérome (France) Sebastian Viale (Italy) Mauro Casadei (United States) Joe Castellano	Porsche 997 GT3 Cup	406
50	SP3	119	(United Arab Emirates) GULF TEAM	(Australia) John Iossifidis (Australia) Martin Baerschmidt (Lebanon) Yusif Bassil (Japan) Keiko Ihara	Aston Martin Vantage N24	404
51	A6	9	(United Arab Emirates) GULF RACING	(Germany) Roald Goethe (United Kingdom) Archie Hamilton (United Kingdom) Stuart Hall (United Kingdom) Michael Wainwright	Lamborghini Gallardo LP600	394
52	997	44	(Poland) Förch Racing	(Poland) Rafal Mikrut (Poland) Bartosz Opiola (Poland) Pawel Kowalski (Germany) Bernd Kleinbach (Poland) Marcin Gawarecki	Porsche 997 GT3 Cup	376
53	A6	7	(Slovakia) ARC Bratislava	(Slovakia) Miro Konôpka (Poland) Teo Myszkowski (Poland) Andrzej Lewandowski (Germany) Marco Schelp	Porsche 997 RSR	362
54	SP3	115	(Hong Kong) Track Torque Ltd	(Hong Kong) Nigel Farmer (Italy) Nicola Pantone (United Kingdom) Matthew Perry	Ginetta G50	360
55	A2	82	(Germany) S.I.G. Motorsport	(Germany) Hermann Bock (Germany) Martin Heidrich (Germany) Rainer Partl (Germany) Jürgen Bretschneider	Mini Cooper S Works	358
56	A6	30	(Japan) JLOC	(Japan) Hiroyuki Iiri (Japan) Yuya Sakamoto (Japan) Takayuki Aoki (Japan) Manabu Orido	Lamborghini Gallardo	336
57	SP2	110	(Germany) Guttroff Motorsport	(Germany) Tobias Guttroff (Germany) Joachim Kiesch (Germany) Andreas Möntmann (Germany) Gerd Beisel (United Kingdom) Robert Hissom	Chevrolet Corvette C6	333
58	A2	87	(United Arab Emirates) Galotti Team Motorsport	(United Arab Emirates) Robert Galotti (Saudi Arabia) Alqassim Hamidaddin (Saudi Arabia) Mohammed Al Saud (United Arab Emirates) Maurice Faber (United Arab Emirates) Abbas Al Alawi	Suzuki Swift	333
59	SP3	123	(Netherlands) Team Jordans.nl	(Netherlands) Monny Krant (Netherlands) Ton Verkoelen (Netherlands) Ivo Breukers (Netherlands) Henk Thijssen	Saker GT TDI	322
60	A6	8	(United Arab Emirates) GULF RACING	(France) Fabien Giroix (Ivory Coast) Frédéric Fatien	Lamborghini Gallardo LP600	318
61	SP3	126	(Netherlands) Marcos Racing	(United States) Hal Prewitt (United Kingdom) Alistair MacKinnon (Netherlands) Richard Verburg (United Kingdom) Simon Atkins (Netherlands) Cor Euser	Lotus Evora	298
62	SP3	888	(Netherlands) Red Camel-Jordans.nl	(Netherlands) Monny Krant (Netherlands) Bert de Heus (Netherlands) Ivo Breukers (Netherlands) Cees Visser	Audi R8	254
63	997	43	(Poland) Förch Racing	(Poland) Clemens Schmid (Poland) Mariusz Miekos (Poland) Adam Kornacki (Germany) Florian Scholze (Poland) Stefan Bilinski	Porsche 997 GT3 Cup	254
64	SP3	127	(Germany) Hamburg Racing	(Germany) Oliver Bliss (Germany) Harald Schlotter (France) Eric Vaissière (France) Philippe Ulivieri	Aston Martin Vantage N24	248
65	A6	2	(Italy) AF Corse	(South Africa) Jack Gerber (Republic of Ireland) Matt Griffin (Italy) Marco Cioci (Italy) Nicola Cadei	Ferrari 458 Italia GT3	213
66	SP3	31	(Germany) Hamburg Racing	(Germany) Kersten Jodexnis (Germany) Ed Nicelife (France) Marcel Belka (Netherlands) Max Braams (Canada) Bassam Kronfli	Aston Martin Vantage N24	210
67	SP2	107	(Netherlands) VDH-Vermeulen Racing	(Netherlands) Jeroen van den Heuvel (Netherlands) Huub Vermeulen (Netherlands) Ruud Vollebregt (Netherlands) Aad Duivenstijn	DNRT V8	205
68	A6	12	(United Arab Emirates) AUH Motorsports/FF Corse	(South Africa) Leon Price (United Kingdom) Rob Barff (South Africa) Jordan Grogor (United Kingdom) Charlie Hollings	Ferrari 458 Italia GT3	142
69	SP2	105	(France) GC Automobile	(France) Bernard Salam (France) Olivier Salam (France) Christophe Contre (Belgium) Michel Pulinx (France) Eric Poitevineau	GC Automobile GC10-V8	128
70	A6	32	(United Kingdom) JRM Nissan	(Germany) Michael Krumm (United Kingdom) Alex Buncombe (United Kingdom) Tom Kimber-Smith (France) Franck Mailleux	Nissan GT-R GT3	73
DNS	A5	53	(Luxembourg) DUWO RACING	(Luxembourg) Jean-Marie Dumont (France) Frédéric Schmit (France) Nicolas Schmit (France) Stéphane Bailly (France) Thierry Chkondali	BMW M3 E46	
DNS	A2	130	(United Arab Emirates) SVDP Racing	(United Kingdom) Spencer Vanderpal (Australia) Chris Wishart (United Kingdom) Jonathan Mullan (United Kingdom) Peter Moulsdale	BMW 120d	
DNS	A5	140	(Germany) Dolate Motorsport	(Germany) Frank Unverhau (Germany) Marco Petry (Germany) Jörg Hatscher (Ecuador) Andres Serrano (Germany) Jürgen Dolate	BMW 335d E92	
