= Sean Edwards (racing driver) =

British racing driver (1986–2013)

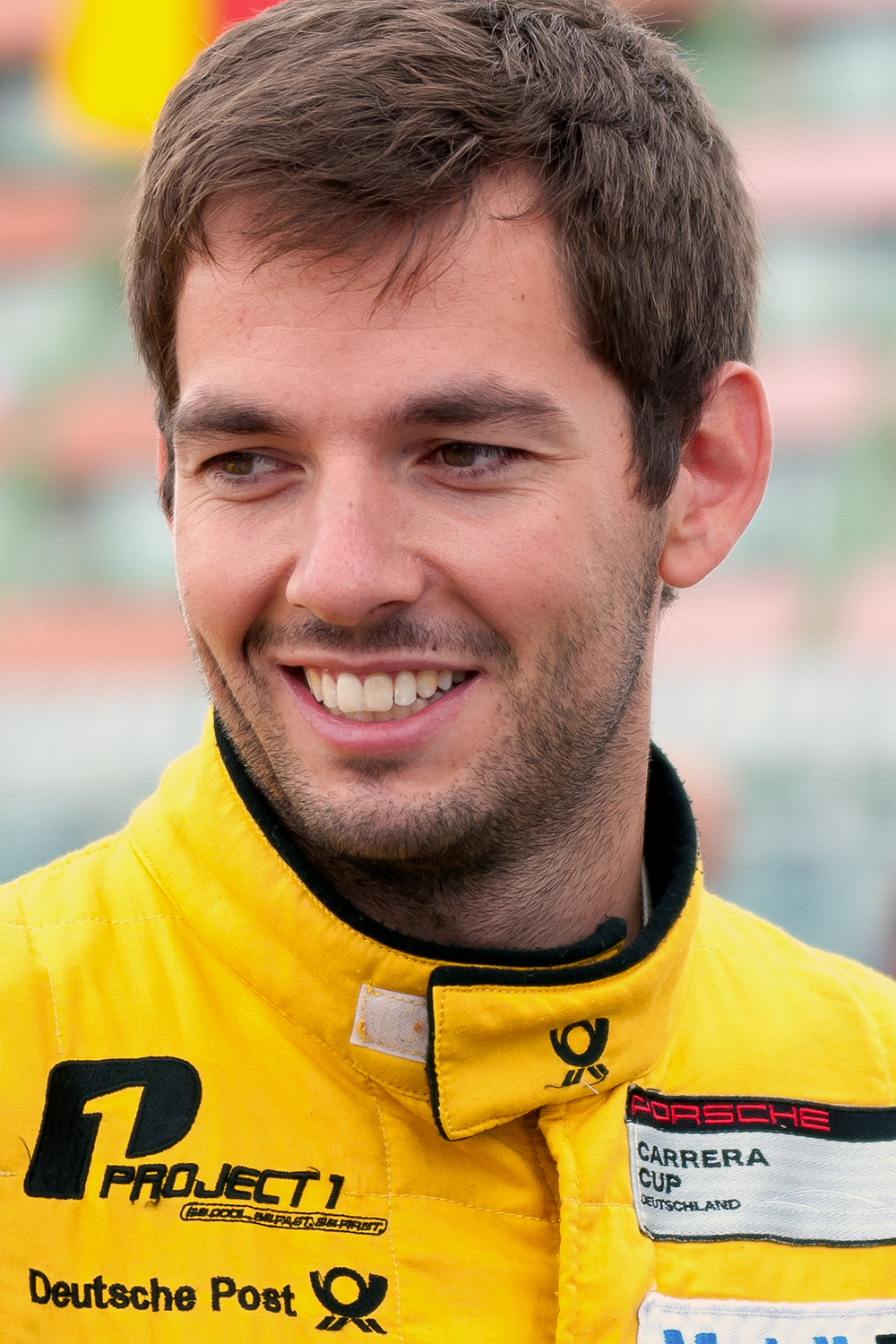
- Edwards at the Porsche Carrera Cup Germany on the Nürburgring in 2013.
- Nationality: (United Kingdom) British
- Born: Sean Lawrence Guy Edwards; 6 December 1986 London, England
- Died: 15 October 2013 (aged 26) Willowbank, Queensland, Australia
- Relatives: Guy Edwards (father)

Porsche Supercup
- Years active: 2008, 2010–13
- Teams: Konrad Motorsport; Tolimit Motorsport
- Starts: 50
- Wins: 8
- Poles: 6
- Fastest laps: 7
- Best finish: 2nd in 2013

Previous series
- 2006–09 2007–09 2010–12 2011–12 2012–13: FIA GT3 European Championship; FIA GT Championship; Porsche Carrera Cup Germany; American Le Mans Series; Rolex Sports Car Series

Championship titles
- 2006: FIA GT3 European Championship

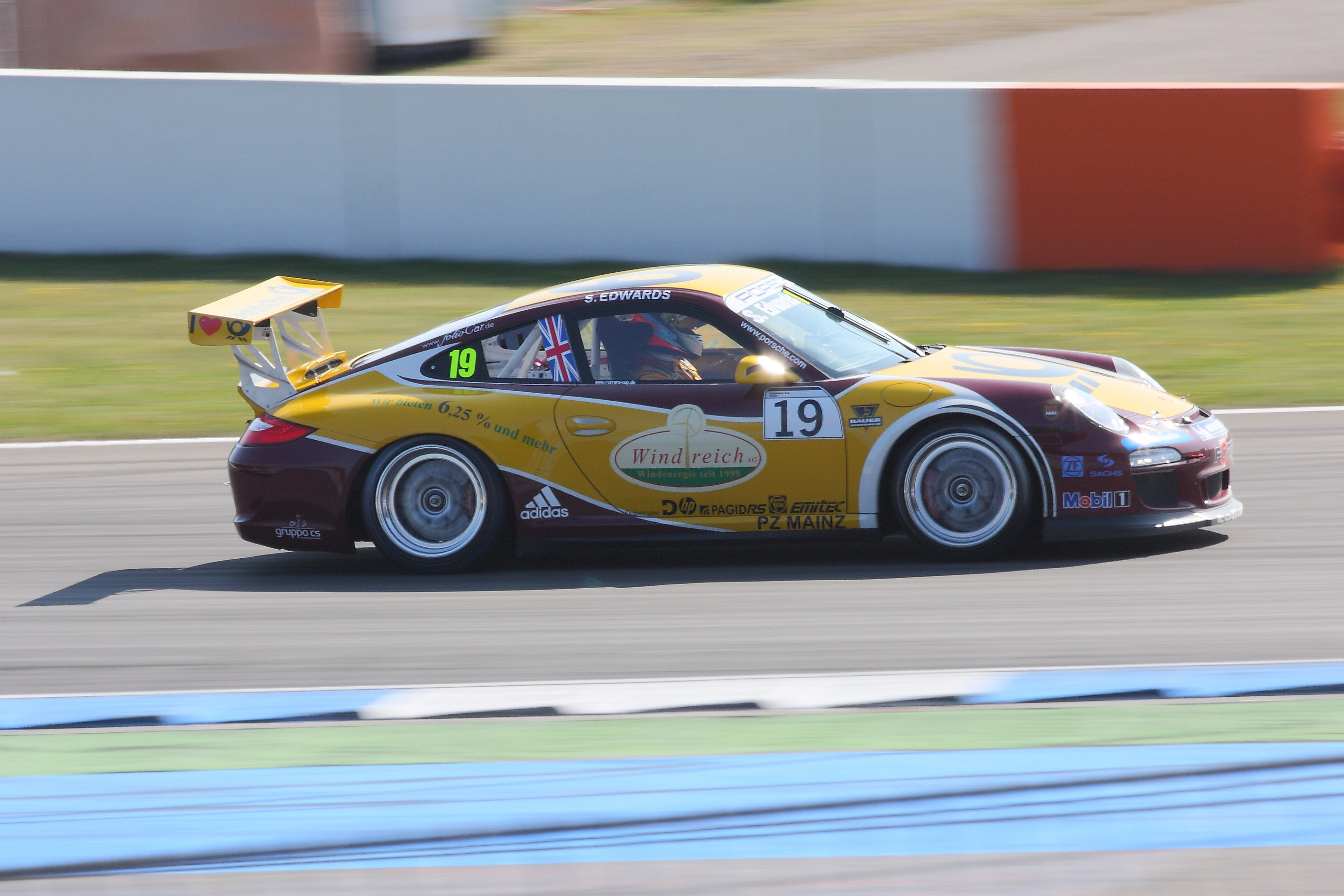
Edwards at the Porsche Mobil 1 Supercup on the Hockenheimring in 2010.

Sean Lawrence Guy Edwards (6 December 1986 − 15 October 2013) was an English professional racing driver, whose career highlight was winning as co-driver the 2013 Nurburgring 24 Hours. He died as a passenger in a private testing incident in October 2013, at Queensland Raceway in Australia.

== Early and personal life ==
Edwards was born in London on 6 December 1986, the son of racing driver Guy Edwards. He was educated at Wellington College and Cherwell College in Oxford. He lived and was based in Monaco.

== Career ==
Edwards started racing at the age of eleven taking part in karting competitions.

After gaining fourth place in the 2003 British Formula Ford Championship, Edwards gained fifth in the 2004 Formula Renault UK, and fifth in the 2005 British GT Championship.

Moving to Monaco, Edwards then undertook drives in various years of the FIA GT3 European Championship, the Porsche Supercup (latterly with Team Allyouneed) and the American Le Mans Series (with MOMO NGT Motorsport). In 2006, he won the FIA European GT3 championship driving a Tech9 Motorsports Porsche GT3 Cup Car. In May 2013, he won the Nurburgring 24 Hours, his first major victory in endurance racing, driving a Mercedes-Benz SLS AMG GT3 alongside Bernd Schneider, Jeroen Bleekemolen and Nicki Thiim.

One of the first professional racing drivers to embrace Sim racing as a means of development and training, in 2012, Edwards assisted with the racing scenes in Ron Howard's film Rush, about the battle between James Hunt and Niki Lauda in the 1976 Formula One season. The younger Edwards also portrayed his father in several scenes of the film, the latter being among the drivers who pulled Lauda from the burning wreckage of his formula one racing car during the 1976 German Grand Prix.

== Death ==
On 15 October 2013, Edwards was killed in a crash during a private session at Queensland Raceway in Willowbank, Queensland, Australia as a passenger whilst instructing Will Holzheimer of Dellow Racing in a Porsche 996 Supercup car. Holzheimer was treated at Royal Brisbane Hospital for injuries and burns.

== Racing record ==
=== Career summary ===
Season	Series	Team	Races	Wins	Poles	F/Laps	Podiums	Points	Position
2003	BRDC Single Seater Championship		12	1	0	0	4	?	4th
2003	Formula Renault 2.0 UK Winter Series	Team JVA	5	0	0	0	0	3	23rd
2004	Formula Renault 2.0 UK Championship	Team JVA	18	0	0	0	0	60	24th
2005	British GT Championship - GT3		3	1	1	1	2	?	5th
2006	FIA GT3 European Championship	Tech9 Motorsport	10	3	1	0	7	54	**1st**
2007	FIA GT Championship - GT2	Tech9 Motorsport	10	0	0	0	1	24.5	15th
2008	Porsche Supercup	Konrad Motorsport	11	2	0	1	4	96	5th
2008	FIA GT Championship - Citation Cup	ARC Bratislava	2	0	1	0	0	?	?
2008	International GT Open - GTS	Konrad Motorsport	2	0	0	0	0	4	30th
2009	FIA GT3 European Championship	Mühlner Motorsport/Trackspeed Racing	4	0	0	?	0	1	56th
2009	Le Mans Series - GT1	ARC Bratislava	1	0	0	0	0	0	NC
2009	Porsche Carrera Cup Germany	Hermes Attempto Racing	2	0	0	0	0	0	NC†
2010	Porsche Supercup	Team Abu Dhabi by tolimit	10	1	1	2	3	95	6th
2010	Porsche Carrera Cup Germany	Team Deutsche Post by tolimit	7	0	0	1	1	68	8th
2010	ADAC GT Masters	Attempto Racing	2	0	0	0	0	0	NC
2011	Porsche Supercup	Team Abu Dhabi by tolimit	11	1	1	1	4	140	4th
2011	Porsche Carrera World Cup	Team Abu Dhabi by tolimit	1	0	0	0	0	N/A	4th
2011	Porsche Carrera Cup Germany	Team Deutsche Post by tolimit	9	2	1	0	6	130	**2nd**
2011	American Le Mans Series - GTC	NGT Motorsport	2	0	1	1	2	41	13th
2011	ADAC GT Masters	Mühlner Motorsport	2	0	0	0	0	0	NC
2012	Porsche Supercup	Konrad Motorsport	10	1	1	0	5	107	5th
2012	Porsche Carrera Cup Germany	Team Deutsche Post by tolimit	17	5	8	6	11	233	**2nd**
2012	American Le Mans Series - GTC	MOMO NGT Motorsport	1	0	1	1	0	6	31st
2012	Rolex Sports Car Series - GT	NGT Motorsport	1	0	0	0	0	16	68th
2012	ADAC GT Masters	Schütz Motorsport	4	0	1	0	1	27	24th
2012	Blancpain Endurance Series - Pro-Am	Black Falcon	3	1	0	0	2	40	12th
2012	24 Hours of Nürburgring - SP9	Black Falcon	1	0	0	0	0	N/A	?
2012	City Challenge Baku	Mühlner Motorsport	1	0	0	1	0	N/A	5th
2012	24 Hours of Le Mans - GTE Am	Prospeed Competition	1	0	0	0	0	N/A	DNF
2013	Porsche Supercup	Team Allyouneed by Project 1	7	3	3	3	4	118	**2nd**
2013	Porsche Carrera Cup Germany	Team Deutsche Post by Project 1	15	1	0	2	6	162	6th
2013	ADAC GT Masters	Farnbacher Racing	2	0	0	0	0	0	NC
2013	American Le Mans Series - GTC	NGT Motorsport	7	1	0	0	5	93	5th
2013	Rolex Sports Car Series - GT	MOMO/NGT Motorsport	1	0	0	0	0	16	62nd
2013	24 Hours of Nürburgring - SP9	Black Falcon	1	1	0	0	1	N/A	**1st**

=== Complete Porsche Supercup results ===
(key) (Races in bold indicate pole position) (Races in italics indicate fastest lap)

Year	Team	Car	1	2	3	4	5	6	7	8	9	10	11	12	DC	Points
2008	Konrad Motorsport	Porsche 997 GT3	BHR; 1	BHR; 1	ESP; 1	TUR; Ret	MON; 1	FRA; 13	GBR; 1	GER; 10	HUN; Ret	ESP; 12	BEL; 1	ITA; 6	5th	96
2010	Team Abu Dhabi by Tolimit	Porsche 997 GT3	BHR; 8	BHR; 15	ESP; 12	MON; 10	TUR; 5	GBR; 12	GER; 19	HUN; 2	**BEL**; 1	ITA; 2			6th	95
2011	Team Abu Dhabi by Tolimit	Porsche 997 GT3	TUR; 4	**ESP**; 1	MON; 3	NNS; 4	GBR; 10	NÜR; 3	HUN; 3	BEL; 6	ITA; Ret	UAE; 6	UAE; 4		4th	140
2012	Konrad Motorsport	Porsche 997 GT3	BHR; 2	BHR; 14	**MON**; 1	VAL; 2	GBR; 3	GER; Ret	HUN; 3	HUN; DSQ	BEL; 5	ITA; DSQ			5th	107
2013	Team Allyouneed by Project 1	Porsche 991	**ESP**; 1	**MON**; 1	GBR; 4	GER; 4	**HUN**; 1	BEL; 2	ITA; 5	UAE	UAE				**2nd**	**118**

=== Complete 24 Hours of Spa results ===
Year	Team	Co-Drivers	Car	Class	Laps	Pos.	Class Pos.
2007	(United Kingdom) Tech9 Motorsport	(Germany) Sascha Maassen (Russia) Leo Machitski	Porsche 997 GT3-RSR	GT2	501	11th	**3rd**

=== Complete 24 Hours of Le Mans results ===
Year	Team	Co-Drivers	Car	Class	Laps	Pos.	Class Pos.
2012	(Belgium) Prospeed Competition	(Saudi Arabia) Abdulaziz al Faisal (United States) Bret Curtis	Porsche 997 GT3-RSR	GTE; Am	180	DNF	DNF

=== Complete 24 Hours of Dubai results ===
Year	Class	No	Car	Team	Co-Drivers	Laps	Pos.	Class Pos.
2010	A6	4	Porsche 997 GT3 RSR; Porsche 4.0L Flat-6	(Slovakia) ARC Bratislava	(Slovakia) Miro Konôpka (United Kingdom) Oliver Morley (Austria) Richard Cvörnjek	87	DNF	DNF
2011	A6	18	Porsche 997 GT3 R Porsche 4.0L Flat-6	(United Arab Emirates) tolimit Arabia	(United Arab Emirates) Khaled Al Qubaisi (Netherlands) Jeroen Bleekemolen (Germany) Sascha Maassen	583	4th	4th
2012	A6	3	Mercedes-Benz SLS AMG GT3; Mercedes-AMG 6.3L V8	(United Arab Emirates) Team Abu Dhabi by Black Falcon	(United Arab Emirates) Khaled Al Qubaisi (Netherlands) Jeroen Bleekemolen (Germany) Thomas Jäger	628	**1st**	**1st**
2013	A6-Pro	1	Mercedes-Benz SLS AMG GT3; Mercedes-AMG 6.3L V8	(United Arab Emirates) Team Abu Dhabi by Black Falcon	(United Arab Emirates) Khaled Al Qubaisi (Netherlands) Jeroen Bleekemolen (Germany) Bernd Schneider	600	**1st**	**1st**

=== Complete Nürburgring 24 Hours results ===
Year	Class	No	Tyres	Car	Team	Co-Drivers	Laps	Pos.	Class Pos.
2012	SP9	15	**D**	Mercedes-Benz SLS AMG GT3; Mercedes-AMG 6.3L V8	(Germany) Black Falcon	(Netherlands) Jeroen Bleekemolen (Germany) Manuel Metzger (Germany) Ralf Schall	4	DNF	DNF
2013	SP9	9	**D**	Mercedes-Benz SLS AMG GT3; Mercedes-AMG 6.3L V8	(Germany) Black Falcon	(Germany) Bernd Schneider (Netherlands) Jeroen Bleekemolen (Denmark) Nicki Thiim	88	**1st**	**1st**
