= Black Falcon (racing team) =

Auto racing team

(Germany) Black Falcon
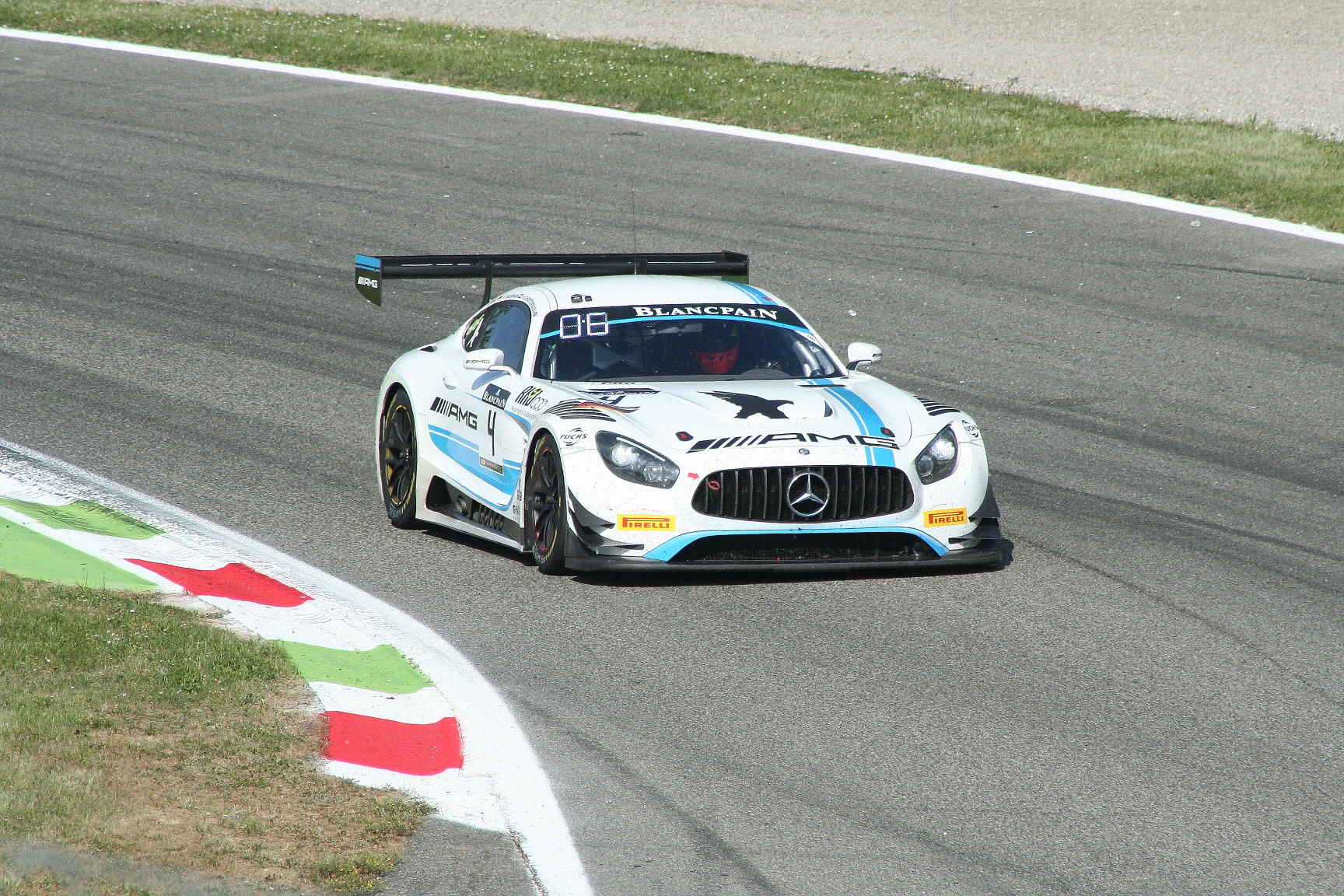
- Founded: 2005
- Base: Meuspath, Rhineland-Palatinate, Germany
- Team principal(s): Alexander Böhm
- Founder(s): Alexander Böhm; Marc Schramm; Marvin Wagner
- Current series: 992 Endurance Cup; Nürburgring Langstrecken-Serie
- Former series: 24H Series; ADAC GT Masters; GT World Challenge Europe; Le Mans Cup; Porsche Carrera Cup Germany; SEAT León Supercopa
- Noted drivers: (United Arab Emirates) Khaled Al Qubaisi (Netherlands) Jeroen Bleekemolen (United Kingdom) Adam Christodoulou (United Kingdom) Sean Edwards (Germany) Maro Engel (Germany) Manuel Metzger (Germany) Bernd Schneider (Denmark) Nicki Thiim
- Drivers' Championships: 2008, 2009, 2011 VLN
- Website: https://www.black-falcon.de/

Black Falcon GmbH & Co. KG is a German auto racing team founded in 2005 by Alexander Böhm, Marc Schramm, and Marvin Wagner. Based in Meuspath, Germany, the team primarily compete in events held at the Nürburgring and are one of the most experienced teams at the famed circuit, with several appearances at the Nürburgring 24 Hours dating back to 2007 and achieving three drivers' titles in the Nürburgring Langstrecken-Serie.

Prior to downsizing their operations in 2020 due to the COVID-19 pandemic, the team were a Mercedes-Benz factory squad, competing in major Group GT3 events and series across Europe and the Middle East with their machinery, including two top 3 overall finishes at the Spa 24 Hours, a record five overall wins at the Dubai 24 Hour, and two overall wins at the Nürburgring 24 Hours, including Mercedes-Benz's first victory at the event in 2013.

== Background ==
Black Falcon was founded in 2005 by Alexander Böhm, Marc Schramm, and Marvin Wagner in Dernbach, Westerwaldkreis, Germany. Starting out in a small workshop between 2005 and late 2006, Black Falcon competed locally in the VLN, racing modified BMW sedans with immediate success, finishing 2nd overall in their debut season. A few months later in February 2007, the team moved into a larger workshop in Kelberg near the Nürburgring.

== Racing history ==
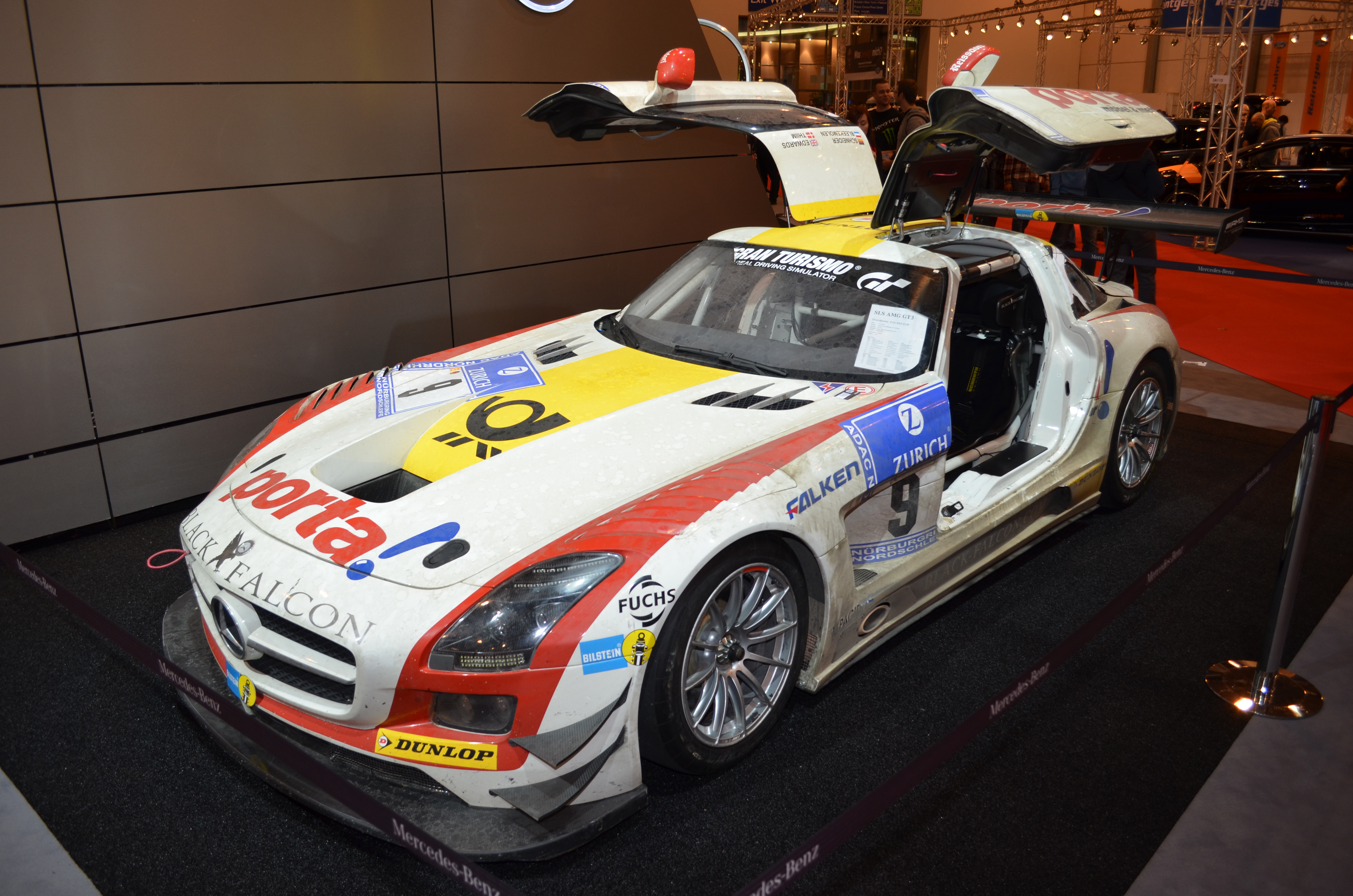
Black Falcon's 2013 24 Hours of Nürburgring race-winning Mercedes-Benz SLS AMG GT3 at the Essen Motor Show.

By 2008, Black Falcon won their first championship, securing the 2008 VLN Series drivers' title with founder Böhm and Matthias Unger with a BMW 325i. They would repeat the following year in 2009, with Böhm joined by Sean Paul Breslin and Christer Jöns, before securing a third championship two years later in 2011 with Carsten Knechtges, Manuel Metzger, and Tim Scheerbarth driving a modified BMW Z4.

Black Falcon raced outside of Germany for the first time in 2010, entering the 2010 Dubai 24 Hour in the A4 and SP2 classes. They won overall for the first time in the 2012 Dubai 24 Hour, finishing as the lead Mercedes-Benz SLS AMG GT3 in what was a podium lockout for Mercedes-Benz, with Khaled Al Qubaisi, Sean Edwards, Jeroen Bleekemolen and Thomas Jäger driving the winning car. Black Falcon repeated in 2013 becoming the first team to win back-to-back since 2007. Across eleven appearances at the Dubai 24 Hour, Black Falcon secured five overall wins (2012, 2013, 2015, 2017, and 2020), making them the most successful team at the event.

In 2013, Black Falcon achieved Mercedes-AMG's maiden win at the 24 Hours of Nürburgring, with Bernd Schneider, Bleekemolen, Edwards and Nicki Thiim beating the charging BMW Z4 GT3 of Marc VDS in a rain-affected race. Black Falcon won again in 2016, as Adam Christodoulou, Maro Engel, Manuel Metzger and Schneider led a historic Mercedes 1-2-3-4 finish after Engel overtook Christian Hohenadel on the final lap. Additionally, the team finished third overall at the 24 Hours of Spa both on debut in 2011 and on its final appearance in 2019.

In 2020, Black Falcon announced that they would be scaling back their factory Group GT3 operations as a result of the COVID-19 pandemic, switching their efforts towards customer racing at the Nürburgring and single-make competitions such as the Porsche Carrera Cup Germany. They were set to compete in the 2020 GT World Challenge Europe with two Mercedes-AMG GT3 Evo entries prior to the announcement, but withdrew as a result. Key personnel then moved to Haupt Racing Team, newly established by long-time Black Falcon driver Hubert Haupt. Black Falcon briefly returned to GT3 racing in the final two races of the 2021 Nürburgring Langstrecken-Serie with a Porsche 911 GT3 R (991.2). The team did not race in GT3 sports cars again until four years later at the 2025 24 Hours of Nürburgring, where they entered a Porsche 911 GT3 R (992) in the SP 9 Pro-Am class.

In 2021, Black Falcon launched a Le Mans Prototype programme for the first time with Lance David Arnold as team manager, entering the 2021 Le Mans Cup's LMP3 class with Donar Munding and Maik Rosenberg.

Midway into the 2023 Nürburgring Langstrecken-Serie season, Black Falcon signed YouTubers Steve Alvarez Brown, Jimmy Broadbent, and Misha Charoudin, entering a modified BMW 330i in the VT2-R class backed by Bilstein for the final four rounds of the season. They moved to SP 8T for 2024 and 2025, driving a BMW M4 GT4 (and later the Evo model) and joined by team regular Manuel Metzger. Following two strong seasons in the series, including two Nürburgring 24 Hours appearances with a 2nd-place class finish in 2025, they progressed to the AT2 class in a Porsche 992 GT3 Cup with support from Fanatec ahead of 2026.

== Race results ==
=== 24 Hours of Spa ===
Year	Entrant	No.	Car	Drivers	Class	Laps	Pos.	Class Pos.
2011	(Germany) Black Falcon	35	Mercedes-Benz SLS AMG GT3	(Germany) Kenneth Heyer (Germany) Thomas Jäger (Belgium) Stéphane Lémeret	GT3 Pro	535	3rd	3rd
2011	(Germany) Black Falcon	38	Mercedes-Benz SLS AMG GT3	(United States) Bret Curtis (Ukraine) Andrii Lebed (Netherlands) Jeroen van der Heuvel (Netherlands) Peter van der Kolk	GT3 Pro-Am	518	12th	5th
2012	(Germany) Black Falcon	18	Mercedes-Benz SLS AMG GT3	(Netherlands) Jeroen Bleekemolen (China) Cheng Congfu (United States) Bret Curtis (Luxembourg) Steve Jans	GT3 Pro-Am	125	Ret	Ret
2012	(Germany) Black Falcon	19	Mercedes-Benz SLS AMG GT3	(Germany) Kenneth Heyer (Germany) Manuel Metzger (United Kingdom) Oliver Morley (Germany) Stephan Rösler	GT3 Pro-Am	473	19th	12th
2013	(Germany) Black Falcon	18	Mercedes-Benz SLS AMG GT3	(United Kingdom) Adam Christodoulou (Netherlands) Klaas Hummel (Germany) Thomas Jäger (Luxembourg) Steve Jans	Pro-Am	551	8th	4th
2013	(Germany) Black Falcon	19	Mercedes-Benz SLS AMG GT3	(Russia) Sergey Afanasyev (Italy) Francesco Castellacci (Ukraine) Andrii Lebed (Sweden) Andreas Simonsen	Pro-Am	520	24th	11th
2014	(Germany) Black Falcon	18	Mercedes-Benz SLS AMG GT3	(Saudi Arabia) Saud Al Faisal (Germany) Christian Bracke (Netherlands) Vladimir Lunkin (Austria) Richard Muscat	Pro-Am	489	34th	16th
2014	(Germany) Black Falcon	19	Mercedes-Benz SLS AMG GT3	(Saudi Arabia) Abdulaziz Al Faisal (Germany) Hubert Haupt (Sweden) Andreas Simonsen	Pro	285	Ret	Ret
2014	(Germany) Black Falcon	63	Mercedes-Benz SLS AMG GT3	(Netherlands) Yelmer Buurman (United Kingdom) Adam Christodoulou (France) Mike Parisy	Pro	517	11th	7th
2015	(Germany) Black Falcon	18	Mercedes-Benz SLS AMG GT3	(Germany) Maro Engel (United States) Sean Johnston (United Kingdom) Oliver Morley (Germany) Bernd Schneider	Pro-Am	226	Ret	Ret
2015	(Germany) Black Falcon	21	Mercedes-Benz SLS AMG GT3	(Saudi Arabia) Abdulaziz Al Faisal (Netherlands) Yelmer Buurman (Germany) Hubert Haupt	Pro	520	12th	6th
2015	(Germany) Black Falcon	29	Mercedes-Benz SLS AMG GT3	(United Kingdom) Adam Christodoulou (Sweden) Andreas Simonsen (Belgium) Nico Verdonck	Pro	106	Ret	Ret
2016	(Germany) AMG - Team Black Falcon	00	Mercedes-AMG GT3	(Netherlands) Yelmer Buurman (Germany) Maro Engel (Germany) Bernd Schneider	Pro	523	20th	16th
2016	(Germany) AMG - Team Black Falcon	56	Mercedes-AMG GT3	(Saudi Arabia) Abdulaziz Al Faisal (Spain) Daniel Juncadella (United Kingdom) Oliver Morley (Spain) Miguel Toril	Pro-Am	516	26th	9th
2016	(Germany) AMG - Team Black Falcon	57	Mercedes-AMG GT3	(United Kingdom) Adam Christodoulou (Germany) Hubert Haupt (Sweden) Andreas Simonsen	Pro	512	33rd	21st
2017	(Germany) Mercedes-AMG Team Black Falcon	4	Mercedes-AMG GT3	(Netherlands) Yelmer Buurman (United Kingdom) Adam Christodoulou (Germany) Luca Stolz	Pro	545	8th	8th
2017	(Germany) Team Black Falcon	15	Mercedes-AMG GT3	(Netherlands) Jeroen Bleekemolen (United States) Dore Chaponik (United States) Scott Heckert (United States) Brett Sandberg	Pro-Am	209	NC	NC
2017	(Germany) Mercedes-AMG Team Black Falcon	16	Mercedes-AMG GT3	(Germany) Maximilian Götz (Germany) Marvin Kirchhöfer (United Kingdom) Oliver Morley (Spain) Miguel Toril	Pro-Am	540	12th	1st
2017	(Germany) Team Black Falcon	18	Mercedes-AMG GT3	(Saudi Arabia) Abdulaziz Al Faisal (Germany) Hubert Haupt (Italy) Gabriele Piana (Netherlands) Renger van der Zande	Pro-Am	228	NC	NC
2018	(Germany) Mercedes-AMG Team Black Falcon	4	Mercedes-AMG GT3	(Netherlands) Yelmer Buurman (Germany) Maro Engel (Germany) Luca Stolz	Pro	511	5th	5th
2018	(Germany) Mercedes-AMG Team Black Falcon	5	Mercedes-AMG GT3	(Portugal) Rui Águas (Saudi Arabia) Saud Al Faisal (Greece) Kriton Lendoudis (United Kingdom) Tom Onslow-Cole	Pro-Am	490	31st	6th
2018	(Germany) Mercedes-AMG Team Black Falcon	6	Mercedes-AMG GT3	(Saudi Arabia) Abdulaziz Al Faisal (Germany) Hubert Haupt (Germany) Manuel Metzger (Italy) Gabriele Piana	Silver	501	23rd	3rd
2019	(Germany) Mercedes-AMG Team Black Falcon	4	Mercedes-AMG GT3	(Netherlands) Yelmer Buurman (Germany) Maro Engel (Germany) Luca Stolz	Pro	363	3rd	3rd
2019	(Germany) Mercedes-AMG Team Black Falcon	6	Mercedes-AMG GT3	(Saudi Arabia) Abdulaziz Al Faisal (Germany) Patrick Assenheimer (Germany) Hubert Haupt (Italy) Gabriele Piana	Silver	358	24th	3rd

=== Dubai 24 Hour ===
Year	Entrant	No.	Car	Drivers	Class	Laps	Pos.	Class Pos.
2010	(Germany) Team Black Falcon	88	BMW Z4 Coupe Si (E89)	(Germany) Alexander Böhm (Switzerland) Marc Colell (Ukraine) Andrii Lebed (Germany) Kai Riebetz (Russia) Oleg Volin	A4	494	31st	1st
2010	(Germany) Team Black Falcon	111	BMW M3 (E92)	(Republic of Ireland) Sean Patrick Breslin (Republic of Ireland) Sean Paul Breslin (Germany) Alexander Böhm (Germany) Christer Jöns (Tanzania) Vimal Mehta	SP2	560	12th	1st
2011	(Germany) Black Falcon	7	Mercedes-Benz SLS AMG GT3	(Republic of Ireland) Sean Paul Breslin (Germany) Kenneth Heyer (Germany) Thomas Jäger (Germany) Jan Seyffarth	A6	590	3rd	3rd
2011	(Germany) Black Falcon	8	Mercedes-Benz SLS AMG GT3	(United States) Bret Curtis (Germany) David Horn (United States) Tim Pappas (Germany) Ralf Schall	A6	525	24th	12th
2012	(United Arab Emirates) Abu Dhabi by Black Falcon	3	Mercedes-Benz SLS AMG GT3	(United Arab Emirates) Khaled Al Qubaisi (United Kingdom) Sean Edwards (Netherlands) Jeroen Bleekemolen (Germany) Thomas Jäger	A6	628	1st	1st
2012	(Germany) Black Falcon Team TMD Friction	23	BMW M3 GT4 (E92)	(Luxembourg) Steve Jans (Germany) Manuel Metzger (Germany) Michael Pflüger (Switzerland) Christian Raubach (Germany) Christian von Rieff	SP3	549	18th	2nd
2013	(United Arab Emirates) Team Abu Dhabi by Black Falcon	1	Mercedes-Benz SLS AMG GT3	(United Arab Emirates) Khaled Al Qubaisi (United Kingdom) Sean Edwards (Netherlands) Jeroen Bleekemolen (Germany) Thomas Jäger	A6-Pro	600	1st	1st
2013	(United Arab Emirates) Team Abu Dhabi by Black Falcon	2	Mercedes-Benz SLS AMG GT3	(Russia) Sergey Afanasyev (United Arab Emirates) Khaled Al Qubaisi (Luxembourg) Steve Jans (Netherlands) Simon Knap (Sweden) Andreas Simonsen	A6-Pro	580	7th	7th
2013	(Germany) Black Falcon Team TMD Friction	44	Porsche 911 GT3 Cup (997)	(Netherlands) Patrick Huisman (Germany) Burkard Kaiser (Switzerland) Christian Raubach (Germany) Erwin Stückle (Germany) Christian von Rieff	997	503	28th	5th
2014	(United Arab Emirates) Team Abu Dhabi by Black Falcon	1	Mercedes-Benz SLS AMG GT3	(United Arab Emirates) Khaled Al Qubaisi (Netherlands) Jeroen Bleekemolen (Germany) Bernd Schneider (Sweden) Andreas Simonsen	A6-Pro	431	49th	13th
2014	(Germany) Black Falcon	2	Mercedes-Benz SLS AMG GT3	(Saudi Arabia) Abdulaziz Al Faisal (United Arab Emirates) Khaled Al Qubaisi (Netherlands) Jeroen Bleekemolen (United Kingdom) Adam Christodoulou (Germany) Hubert Haupt	A6-Pro	597	3rd	3rd
2014	(Germany) Black Falcon	44	Porsche 911 GT3 Cup (997)	(Switzerland) Arturo Devigus (Denmark) Anders Fjordbach (Germany) Willi Friedrichs (Germany) Burkard Kaiser (Russia) Vladimir Lunkin	997	574	14th	2nd
2014	(Germany) Black Falcon	156	Porsche 911 Carrera (991)	(Netherlands) Philip Dries (Netherlands) Gerwin Schuring (Germany) Christian von Rieff (Germany) Helmut Weber	A5	511	27th	2nd
2015	(Germany) Black Falcon	2	Mercedes-Benz SLS AMG GT3	(Saudi Arabia) Abdulaziz Al Faisal (Netherlands) Yelmer Buurman (Germany) Hubert Haupt (United Kingdom) Oliver Webb	A6-Pro	604	1st	1st
2015	(United Arab Emirates) Abu Dhabi Racing Black Falcon	3	Mercedes-Benz SLS AMG GT3	(United Arab Emirates) Khaled Al Qubaisi (Netherlands) Jeroen Bleekemolen (Germany) Bernd Schneider (Sweden) Andreas Simonsen	A6-Pro	88	Ret	Ret
2015	(Germany) Black Falcon	25	Porsche 911 GT3 Cup (991)	(Germany) Burkard Kaiser (Germany) Manuel Metzger (Switzerland) Christian Raubach (Netherlands) Gerwin Schuring	997	580	10th	2nd
2015	(Germany) Black Falcon	26	Porsche 911 GT3 Cup (991)	(Saudi Arabia) Saud Al Faisal (Denmark) Anders Fjordbach (Japan) Keita Sawa (Germany) Andreas Weishaupt	997	580	9th	1st
2016	(Germany) Abu Dhabi Racing Black Falcon	2	Mercedes-Benz SLS AMG GT3	(United Arab Emirates) Khaled Al Qubaisi (Netherlands) Jeroen Bleekemolen (Netherlands) Indy Dontje (Germany) Maro Engel (Germany) Hubert Haupt	A6-Pro	163	Ret	Ret
2016	(Germany) Black Falcon	3	Mercedes-Benz SLS AMG GT3	(Saudi Arabia) Abdulaziz Al Faisal (Poland) Michal Broniszewski (Netherlands) Yelmer Buurman (Germany) Hubert Haupt (United Kingdom) Bernd Schneider	A6-Pro	154	Ret	Ret
2016	(Germany) Black Falcon	16	Mercedes-Benz SLS AMG GT3	(Saudi Arabia) Abdulaziz Al Faisal (United Kingdom) Adam Christodoulou (United States) Frankie Montecalvo (United Kingdom) Oliver Morley (United Kingdom) Oliver Webb	A6-Pro	583	2nd	2nd
2016	(Germany) Black Falcon Team TMD Friction	60	Porsche 911 GT3 Cup (991)	(Austria) Klaus Bachler (Germany) Burkard Kaiser (Russia) Stanislav Minsky (Germany) Sören Spreng (Germany) Mark Wallenwein	991	550	17th	5th
2016	(Germany) Black Falcon Team TMD Friction	61	Porsche 911 GT3 Cup (991)	(Saudi Arabia) Saud Al Faisal (Saudi Arabia) Saeed Al Mouri (Denmark) Anders Fjordbach (Germany) Manuel Metzger (Netherlands) Gerwin Schuring	991	559	14th	3rd
2017	(Germany) Black Falcon	2	Mercedes-AMG GT3	(United Arab Emirates) Khaled Al Qubaisi (Germany) Patrick Assenheimer (Netherlands) Jeroen Bleekemolen (Germany) Manuel Metzger	A6-Pro	397	Ret	Ret
2017	(Germany) Black Falcon	3	Mercedes-AMG GT3	(Saudi Arabia) Abdulaziz Al Faisal (Poland) Michał Broniszewski (Netherlands) Yelmer Buurman (Germany) Maro Engel (Germany) Hubert Haupt	A6-Pro	575	3rd	3rd
2017	(Germany) Black Falcon Team TMD Friction	68	Porsche 911 GT3 Cup (991)	(Saudi Arabia) Saud Al Faisal (Saudi Arabia) Saeed Al Mouri (Denmark) Anders Fjordbach (Spain) Alexander Toril	991	555	11th	1st
2017	(Germany) Black Falcon Team TMD Friction	69	Porsche 911 GT3 Cup (991)	(Saudi Arabia) Bondar Alesayi (Germany) Burkard Kaiser (Germany) Sören Spreng (Spain) Miguel Toril	991	538	23rd	5th
2017	(Germany) Black Falcon Team TMD Friction	243	Porsche Cayman GT4 Clubsport (981)	(Turkey) Mustafa Mehmet Kaya (Germany) Fidel Leib (Italy) Gabriele Piana (Germany) Aurel Schoeller	SP3-GT4	245	NC	NC
2018	(Germany) Black Falcon	2	Mercedes-AMG GT3	(Saudi Arabia) Abdulaziz Al Faisal (Netherlands) Yelmer Buurman (Germany) Hubert Haupt (Italy) Gabriele Piana	A6-Pro	606	1st	1st
2018	(Germany) Black Falcon	3	Mercedes-AMG GT3	(United Arab Emirates) Khaled Al Qubaisi (Netherlands) Jeroen Bleekemolen (Germany) Manuel Metzger (Germany) Luca Stolz	A6-Pro	502	Ret	Ret
2018	(Germany) Black Falcon	7	Mercedes-AMG GT3	(Portugal) Rui Águas (Saudi Arabia) Saud Al Faisal (Saudi Arabia) Saeed Al Mouri (Greece) Kriton Lendoudis	A6-Am	499	57th	11th
2018	(Germany) Black Falcon Team TMD Friction	264	Mercedes-AMG GT R SP-X	(Hong Kong) Antares Au (Hong Kong) Jonathan Hui (Macau) Kevin Tse (Hong Kong) Frank Yu	GT4	548	31st	3rd
2019	(Germany) Black Falcon	2	Mercedes-AMG GT3	(Saudi Arabia) Abdulaziz Al Faisal (Saudi Arabia) Saud Al Faisal (Netherlands) Yelmer Buurman (United Kingdom) Adam Christodoulou (Germany) Hubert Haupt	A6-Pro	579	15th	7th
2019	(Germany) Black Falcon	3	Mercedes-AMG GT3	(United Arab Emirates) Khaled Al Qubaisi (Netherlands) Jeroen Bleekemolen (United States) Ben Keating (Germany) Manuel Metzger (Germany) Luca Stolz	A6-Pro	380	Ret	Ret
2020	(Germany) Black Falcon	4	Mercedes-AMG GT3	(United Arab Emirates) Khaled Al Qubaisi (United Kingdom) Ben Barker (Netherlands) Jeroen Bleekemolen (Germany) Hubert Haupt (Germany) Manuel Metzger	GT3-Pro	168	1st	1st

=== 24 Hours of Nürburgring ===
Year	Entrant	No.	Car	Drivers	Class	Laps	Pos.	Class Pos.
2007	(Germany) Black Falcon/Performance Center Nürburg	194	BMW 3 Series (E90)	(Netherlands) Dillon Koster (Italy) Diego Romanini (Germany) Marian Winz (Germany) Holger Zulauf	V3-V4	93	43rd	2nd
2007	(Germany) Black Falcon/Performance Center Nürburg	195	BMW 3 Series (E90)	(Germany) "Bona Ventura" (Germany) Dieter Lehner (Germany) Christian Senz (Germany) Matthias Unger	V3-V4	94	34th	1st
2007	(Germany) Black Falcon/Performance Center Nürburg	216	BMW 3 Series (E92)	(Germany) Martin Elzer (Germany) Heiko Heinemann (United Kingdom) Ralf Willems	V5	24	Ret	Ret
2008	(Germany) Sartorius Team Black Falcon	38	BMW M3 (E92)	(United Kingdom) Sean Paul Breslin (Netherlands) Dillon Koster (Italy) Diego Romanini (Germany) Jan Sloten	SP7	129	34th	14th
2008	(Germany) Sartorius Team Black Falcon	73	BMW 130i (E87)	(Switzerland) Laurentius Michielse (Netherlands) Ron Swart (Netherlands) Erik Weijers (Germany) Holger Zulauf	SP5	90	Ret	Ret
2008	(Germany) Sartorius Team Black Falcon	204	BMW 325i (E90)	(Germany) Alexander Böhm (Germany) Michael Rebhan (Germany) Matthias Unger (Germany) Marian Winz	V3-V4	126	48th	1st
2008	(Germany) Sartorius Team Black Falcon GmbH	214	BMW 3 Series (E92)	(Germany) Martin Elzer (Germany) Heiko Heinemann (United Kingdom) Ralf Willems	V5	128	39th	3rd
2008	(Germany) Sartorius Team Black Falcon	224	BMW M3 (E46)	(Germany) "Bona Ventura" (Germany) Christer Jöns (Germany) Dieter Lehner (Germany) Jürgen Stumpf	V6	134	24th	1st
2009	(Germany) Sartorius Team Black Falcon	36	BMW M3 (E92)	(Germany) "Bona Ventura" (Germany) Christer Jöns (Netherlands) Dillon Koster (Italy) Diego Romanini	SP7	110	93rd	6th
2009	(Germany) Sartorius Team Black Falcon	162	BMW 325i (E90)	(Germany) Alexander Böhm (Germany) Sebastian Kamps (Ukraine) Andrii Lebed (Germany) Kai Riebetz	V4	121	69th	4th
2009	(Germany) Sartorius Team Black Falcon	176	BMW Z4 (E86)	(Switzerland) Marc Colell (Germany) Daniel Schwerfeldt (Netherlands) Ron Swart (Netherlands) Eric Peter Weijers	SP5	130	43rd	3rd
2009	(Germany) Sartorius Team Black Falcon	188	BMW M3 (E46)	(United Kingdom) Andrew Baughan (United Kingdom) Sean Paul Breslin (Germany) Maik Rosenberg (United Kingdom) Ralf Willems	V6	131	40th	1st
2010	(Germany) Black Falcon	102	Audi R8 LMS	(United Kingdom) Sean Paul Breslin (Germany) Kenneth Heyer (Germany) Christer Jöns (Liechtenstein) Johannes Stuck	SP9 GT3	152	5th	3rd
2010	(Germany) Black Falcon	120	BMW M3 GT4 (E92)	(Germany) "Bona Ventura" (Germany) Alexander Böhm (Ukraine) Andrii Lebed (Germany) Kai Riebetz	SP10 GT4	134	32nd	2nd
2010	(Germany) Black Falcon	180	BMW Z4 3.0 Si (E86)	(Germany) Carsten Knechtges (Germany) Philipp Leisen (Russia) Evgeny Vertunov (Russia) Oleg Volin	V5	131	45th	3rd
2011	(Germany) Black Falcon	20	Mercedes-Benz SLS AMG GT3	(Ukraine) Andrii Lebed (Germany) Hannes Plesse (Germany) Maik Rosenberg (Germany) Ralf Schall	SP9 GT3	131	49th	16th
2011	(Germany) Black Falcon	21	Mercedes-Benz SLS AMG GT3	(United Kingdom) Sean Patrick Breslin (United Kingdom) Sean Paul Breslin (United Kingdom) Vimal Mehta (Germany) Stephan Rösler	SP9 GT3	150	11th	7th
2011	(Germany) Black Falcon	22	Mercedes-Benz SLS AMG GT3	(Netherlands) Jeroen Bleekemolen (Germany) Kenneth Heyer (Germany) Thomas Jäger (Germany) Jan Seyffarth	SP9 GT3	153	6th	4th
2011	(Germany) Black Falcon Team TMD Friction	225	BMW Z4 (E86)	(Germany) Carsten Knechtges (Germany) Philipp Leisen (Germany) Manuel Metzger (Germany) Tim Scheerbarth	V5	135	31st	1st
2011	(Germany) Black Falcon Team TMD Friction	226	BMW 3 Series (E92)	(Germany) Hans Dampf (Germany) Jürgen Dienstühler (Luxembourg) Steve Jans (Switzerland) Christian Raubach	V5	132	43rd	4th
2011	(Germany) Black Falcon Team TMD Friction	227	BMW Z4 (E86)	(Germany) Markus Enzinger (Germany) Jörg Krell (Germany) Sebastian Krell (Germany) Christian Reiter	V5	126	69th	6th
2012	(Germany) Black Falcon	16	Mercedes-Benz SLS AMG GT3	(Germany) Christian Bracke (Ukraine) Andril Lebed (Germany) Hannes Plesse (Germany) Reinhold Renger	SP9	147	14th	12th
2012	(Germany) Black Falcon Team TMD Friction	221	BMW M3 (E92)	(Germany) Carsten Knechtges (Switzerland) Christian Raubach (Germany) Tim Scheerbarth (Germany) Christian von Rieff	V5	130	42nd	1st
2012	(Germany) Black Falcon Team TMD Friction	233	BMW M3 CSL (E46)	(Germany) Jürgen Dinstühler (Germany) Markus Enzinger (Germany) Christian Reiter (Germany) Michael Pflüger	V6	133	36th	1st
2012	(Germany) Black Falcon Team TMD Friction	234	BMW M3 (E92)	(Germany) David Jahn (Luxembourg) Steve Jans (Germany) Carsten Knechtges (Germany) Tim Scheerbarth	V6	129	45th	4th
2013	(Germany) Black Falcon	9	Mercedes-Benz SLS AMG GT3	(Netherlands) Jeroen Bleekemolen (United Kingdom) Sean Edwards (Germany) Bernd Schneider (Denmark) Nicki Thiim	SP9	88	1st	1st
2013	(Germany) Black Falcon	10	Mercedes-Benz SLS AMG GT3	(Ukraine) Andrii Lebed (Austria) Harald Proczyk (Germany) Dennis Rostek (Sweden) Andreas Simonsen	SP9	52	58th	21st
2013	(Germany) Black Falcon Team TMD Friction	54	Porsche 911 GT3 Cup 3.8 (997)	(Germany) "Friedrichs Willi" (Germany) Burkard Kaiser (Switzerland) Christian Raubach (Germany) Christian von Rieff	SP7	80	26th	7th
2013	(Germany) Black Falcon Team TMD Friction	55	Porsche 911 GT3 Cup 3.8 (997)	(Germany) David Jahn (Luxembourg) Steve Jans (Germany) Hannes Plesse (Germany) Maik Rosenberg	SP7	84	15th	4th
2013	(Germany) Black Falcon	63	Mercedes-Benz SLS AMG GT3	(United Arab Emirates) Khaled Al Qubaisi (Germany) Christian Bracke (Germany) Daniel Keilwitz (Tanzania) Vimal Mehta	SP9	82	19th	15th
2014	(Germany) Black Falcon Team Reissdorf Alkoholfrei	1	Mercedes-Benz SLS AMG GT3	(Netherlands) Jeroen Bleekemolen (Germany) Lance David Arnold (Germany) Christian Menzel (Sweden) Andreas Simonsen	SP9 GT3	159	2nd	2nd
2014	(Germany) Black Falcon	14	Mercedes-Benz SLS AMG GT3	(Saudi Arabia) Abdulaziz Al Faisal (Netherlands) Yelmer Buurman (United Kingdom) Adam Christodoulou (Germany) Hubert Haupt	SP9 GT3	72	NC	NC
2014	(Germany) Black Falcon Team Reissdorf Alkoholfrei	56	Porsche 911 GT3 Cup (991)	(Germany) David Jahn (Germany) Hannes Plesse (Germany) Maik Rosenberg (Germany) Andreas Weishaupt	SP7	150	12th	1st
2014	(Germany) Black Falcon Team TMD Friction	58	Porsche 911 GT3 Cup (991)	(Germany) "Friedrichs Willi" (Germany) Burkard Kaiser (Germany) Carsten Knechtges (Germany) Andreas Ziegler	SP7	145	18th	5th
2014	(Germany) Black Falcon Team TMD Friction	159	Porsche 911 Carrera (991)	(Germany) Alexander Kolb (Germany) Julius-Ferdinand Kolb (Germany) Vincent Kolb (Germany) Helmut Weber	V6	135	45th	4th
2014	(Germany) Black Falcon Team TMD Friction	160	Porsche Cayman S (981)	(Germany) Markus Enzinger (Germany) Jean-Louis Hertenstein (Germany) Christian Reiter (Germany) Panagiotis Spiliopoulos	V6	108	105th	8th
2014	(Germany) Black Falcon Team TMD Friction	161	Porsche 911 Carrera (991)	(Netherlands) "Gerwin" (Netherlands) "Philip" (Switzerland) Manuel Metzger (Germany) Tim Scheerbarth	V6	138	30th	2nd
2015	(Germany) Black Falcon	2	Mercedes-Benz SLS AMG GT3	(Netherlands) Yelmer Buurman (United Kingdom) Adam Christodoulou (Germany) Bernd Schneider (Sweden) Andreas Simonsen	SP9 GT3	31	Ret	Ret
2015	(Germany) Black Falcon	5	Mercedes-Benz SLS AMG GT3	(Saudi Arabia) Abdulaziz Al Faisal (Netherlands) Yelmer Buurman (Germany) Hubert Haupt (Netherlands) Jaap van Lagen	SP9 GT3	155	5th	5th
2015	(Germany) Black Falcon Team TMD Friction	61	Porsche 911 GT3 Cup (991)	(Germany) "Gerwin" (Austria) Philipp Eng (Germany) Manuel Metzger (Germany) Hannes Plesse	SP7	148	13th	1st
2015	(Germany) Black Falcon Team TMD Friction	161	Porsche 911 Carrera (991)	(Germany) Jürgen Bleul (Germany) Christian Raubach (Germany) Aurel Schoeller (Germany) Sören Spreng	SP6	74	Ret	Ret
2015	(Germany) Black Falcon Team TMD Friction	162	Porsche 911 Carrera (991)	(Netherlands) "Philip" (Germany) Andre Kuhn (Germany) Sabine Schmitz (Germany) Helmut Weber	V6	136	26th	1st
2015	(Germany) Black Falcon Team TMD Friction	178	Porsche Cayman (981)	(Germany) Jürgen Bleul (Switzerland) Christian Raubach (Germany) Aurel Schoeller (Germany) Sören Spreng	V5	9	Ret	Ret
2016	(Germany) AMG-Team Black Falcon	4	Mercedes-AMG GT3	(United Kingdom) Adam Christodoulou (Germany) Maro Engel (Germany) Manuel Metzger (Germany) Bernd Schneider	SP9	134	1st	1st
2016	(Germany) AMG-Team Black Falcon	9	Mercedes-AMG GT3	(Netherlands) Yelmer Buurman (Germany) Maro Engel (Germany) Hubert Haupt (Germany) Dirk Müller	SP9	133	4th	4th
2016	(Germany) AMG-Team Black Falcon	14	Mercedes-AMG GT3	(Germany) "Gerwin" (Saudi Arabia) Abdulaziz Al Faisal (Netherlands) Indy Dontje (United Kingdom) Robert Huff	SP9	57	Ret	Ret
2016	(Germany) Black Falcon Team TMD Friction	64	Porsche 911 GT3 Cup (991)	(Switzerland) Arturo Devigus (Germany) Mario Farnbacher (Spain) Alexander Toril (Germany) Andreas Weishaupt	SP7	124	15th	1st
2016	(Germany) Black Falcon Team TMD Friction	140	Porsche 911 (991)	(Germany) "Philip" (Germany) Andre Kuhn (Germany) Aurel Schoeller (Spain) Miguel Toril	V6	116	31st	1st
2016	(Germany) Black Falcon Team TMD Friction	351	Porsche Cayman GT4 Clubsport (981)	(Germany) "Sugar Mountain" (Norway) Christian Bjorn-Hansen (Germany) Stefan Karg (Norway) Runar Vatne	Cup3	27	Ret	Ret
2017	(Germany) Mercedes-AMG Team Black Falcon	1	Mercedes-AMG GT3	(Netherlands) Yelmer Buurman (United Kingdom) Adam Christodoulou (Germany) Maro Engel (Germany) Manuel Metzger	SP9	158	5th	5th
2017	(Germany) Mercedes-AMG Team Black Falcon	3	Mercedes-AMG GT3	(Germany) Maro Engel (Germany) Thomas Jäger (Germany) Dirk Müller (Germany) Jan Seyffarth	SP9	146	23rd	17th
2017	(Germany) Black Falcon	4	Mercedes-AMG GT3	(Saudi Arabia) Abdulaziz Al Faisal (Germany) Hubert Haupt (Spain) Daniel Juncadella (Germany) Luca Stolz	SP9	156	13th	13th
2017	(Germany) Black Falcon Team TMD Friction	65	Porsche 911 GT3 Cup (991)	(Switzerland) "Takis" (Germany) Jurgen Bleul (Germany) Stefan Karg (Spain) Alexander Toril	SP7	29	Ret	Ret
2017	(Germany) Black Falcon Team TMD Friction	72	Porsche Cayman GT4 Clubsport (981)	(United States) Carlos Gomez (Turkey) Mustafa Mehmet Kaya (Germany) Ronny Lethmate (Italy) Gabriele Piana	SP10	140	33rd	1st
2017	(Germany) Black Falcon Team TMD Friction	133	Porsche 911 Carrera (991)	(Saudi Arabia) Saud Al Faisal (Germany) Thomas Bolz (Germany) Fidel Leib (Germany) Aurel Schoeller	V6	135	49th	1st
2018	(Germany) Mercedes-AMG Team Black Falcon	4	Mercedes-AMG GT3	(United Kingdom) Adam Christodoulou (Germany) Maro Engel (Germany) Manuel Metzger (Germany) Dirk Müller	SP9	135	2nd	2nd
2018	(Germany) Mercedes-AMG Team Black Falcon	5	Mercedes-AMG GT3	(Netherlands) Yelmer Buurman (Germany) Thomas Jäger (Germany) Jan Seyffarth (Germany) Luca Stolz	SP9	135	3rd	3rd
2018	(Germany) Black Falcon	6	Mercedes-AMG GT3	(Germany) Nico Bastian (Germany) Hubert Haupt (Sweden) Erik Johansson (Italy) Gabriele Piana	SP9	134	5th	4th
2018	(Germany) Black Falcon Team TMD Friction	64	Porsche 911 GT3 Cup MR	(Switzerland) "Takis" (Germany) Jurgen Bleul (Germany) Moritz Oberheim (Germany) Tim Zimmermann	SP7	-	DNS	DNS
2018	(Germany) Black Falcon Team Identica	66	Mercedes-AMG GT4	(United States) Carlos Gomez (Germany) Stefan Karg (Germany) Fidel Lieb (Germany) Kim-Luis Schramm	SP10	116	51st	1st
2018	(Germany) Black Falcon Team TMD Friction	138	Porsche 911 Carrera (991)	(Germany) Alexander Böhm (Germany) Stephan Köhler (Germany) Axel König (Germany) Norbert Schneider	V6	113	57th	1st
2019	(Germany) Mercedes-AMG Team Black Falcon	2	Mercedes-AMG GT3	(United Kingdom) Adam Christodoulou (Germany) Maro Engel (Germany) Manuel Metzger (Germany) Dirk Müller	SP9 Pro	49	Ret	Ret
2019	(Germany) Mercedes-AMG Team Black Falcon	3	Mercedes-AMG GT3	(Germany) Maximilian Buhk (Germany) Hubert Haupt (Germany) Thomas Jäger (Germany) Luca Stolz	SP9	156	2nd	2nd
2019	(Germany) Mercedes-AMG Team Black Falcon	6	Mercedes-AMG GT3	(Germany) Patrick Assenheimer (Germany) Nico Bastian (Netherlands) Yelmer Buurman (Italy) Gabriele Piana	SP9 Pro	138	Ret	Ret
2019	(Germany) Black Falcon Team Knuffi	46	Mercedes-AMG GT4	(Germany) Stefan Karg (Turkey) Mustafa Mehmet Kaya (Germany) Reinhold Renger (Germany) Mike Stursberg	SP8T	123	71st	6th
2019	(Germany) Black Falcon Team Textar	64	Porsche 911 GT3 Cup MR	(United States) Peter Ludwig (Germany) Maik Rosenberg (Switzerland) Takis Spiliopoulos (United States) Dennis Trebing	SP7	144	22nd	3rd
2019	(Germany) Black Falcon Team Identica	70	Mercedes-AMG GT4	(Germany) Marek Böckmann (Switzerland) Yannick Mettler (Germany) Tobias Müller (Estonia) Tristan Viidas	SP10	145	17th	1st
2019	(Germany) Black Falcon Team Textar	132	Porsche 911 Carrera (991)	(Germany) Christoph Hoffmann (Germany) Carsten Palluth (Germany) Tobias Wahl (United Kingdom) Robert Woodside	V6	131	57th	2nd
2019	(Germany) Black Falcon Team Textar	133	Porsche 911 Carrera (991)	(Russia) Alexander Akimenkov (Germany) Ronny Lethmate (Luxembourg) Carlos Rivas (Russia) Vasilii Selivanov	V6	134	49th	1st
2020	(Germany) Black Falcon Team Identica	35	Porsche 911 GT3 Cup MR	(Germany) Marek Böckmann (Germany) Tobias Müller (Luxembourg) Carlos Rivas (Germany) Maik Rosenberg	SP Pro	77	22nd	1st
2020	(Germany) Black Falcon Team Textar	38	Mercedes-AMG GT4	(Turkey) Mustafa Mehmet Kaya (Germany) Reinhold Renger (Germany) Mike Stursberg (Estonia) Tristan Viidas	SP 8T	78	21st	2nd
2020	(Germany) Black Falcon Team Textar	306	Porsche 718 Cayman GT4 Clubsport	(Germany) "Max" (Germany) Ben Bünnagel (Germany) Florian Naumann (Germany) Michael Rebhan	Cup3	76	30th	1st
2021	(Germany) Black Falcon Team TEXTAR	36	Mercedes-AMG GT4	(Turkey) Mustafa Mehmet Kaya (Italy) Gabriele Piana (Germany) Mike Stursberg (Turkey) Ersin Yücesan	SP 8T	54	26th	1st
2021	(Germany) Black Falcon Team TEXTAR	308	Porsche 718 Cayman GT4 Clubsport	(Germany) "Iceman" (Russia) Alexander Akimenkov (Russia) Vasilii Selivanov (Germany) Tobias Wahl	Cup3	52	46th	5th
2021	(Germany) Black Falcon Team IDENTICA	350	Porsche 911 GT3 Cup MR	(Germany) Noah Nagelsdiek (Germany) Florian Naumann (Luxembourg) Carlos Rivas (Germany) Hendrik von Danwitz	SP Pro	3	Ret	Ret
2022	(Germany) Black Falcon Team TEXTAR	85	Porsche 718 Cayman GT4 RS Clubsport	(Germany) Martin Meenen (Germany) Marco Müller (Germany) Carsten Palluth (Germany) Tobias Wahl	SP 10	99	NC	NC
2022	(Germany) Black Falcon Team IDENTICA	121	Porsche 911 GT3 Cup (992)	(Netherlands) Paul Harkema (Germany) Marco Müller (Germany) Noah Nagelsdiek (Germany) Tim Scheerbarth	Cup2	97	Ret	Ret
2022	(Germany) Black Falcon	122	Porsche 911 GT3 Cup (992)	(United States) Peter Ludwig (Germany) Noah Nagelsdiek (Germany) Maik Rosenberg (Germany) Reinhold Renger	Cup2	97	Ret	Ret
2022	(Germany) Black Falcon	123	Porsche 911 GT3 Cup (992)	(Germany) Ben Bünnagel (Turkey) Mustafa Mehmet Kaya (Italy) Gabriele Piana (Germany) Mike Stursberg	Cup2	151	16th	2nd
2023	(Germany) Black Falcon Team Identica	170	Porsche 911 GT3 Cup (992)	(Turkey) Mustafa Mehmet Kaya (Italy) Gabriele Piana (Luxembourg) Carlos Rivas (Germany) Mike Stursberg	Cup2 Am	-	DNS	DNS
2023	(Germany) Black Falcon Team Textar	189	Porsche 718 Cayman GT4 RS Clubsport	(Germany) Franz Engstler (United States) Cabell Fisher (Germany) Axel Sartingen (Germany) Daniel Schwerfeld	Cup3 Am	122	69th	6th
2024	(Germany) Black Falcon	77	BMW M4 GT4 (G82)	(United States) Charles Espenlaub (United States) Ryan Harrison (United States) Mike Skeen (Romania) Alexandru Vasilescu	SP 10	9	Ret	Ret
2024	(Germany) Black Falcon	103	Porsche 911 GT3 Cup (992)	(Turkey) Mustafa Mehmet Kaya (Italy) Gabriele Piana (Germany) Tim Scheerbarth (Germany) Mike Stursberg	Cup2 Pro	48	20th	1st
2024	(Germany) Black Falcon Team 48 LOSCH	148	Porsche 911 GT3 Cup (992)	(Luxembourg) Steve Jans (Germany) Tobias Müller (Netherlands) Morris Schuring	Cup2 Pro	45	30th	9th
2024	(Germany) Team Bilstein by Black Falcon	150	BMW M4 GT4 (G82)	(United Kingdom) Jimmy Broadbent (Netherlands) Misha Charoudin (Germany) Manuel Metzger	SP 8T	45	38th	2nd
2025	(Germany) Black Falcon Team EAE	48	Porsche 911 GT3 R (992)	(Netherlands) "Daan Arrow" (Germany) Ben Bünnagel (Turkey) Mustafa Mehmet Kaya (Italy) Gabriele Piana	SP 9 Pro-Am	104	65th	14th
2025	(Germany) AV Racing by Black Falcon	67	BMW M4 GT4 Evo (G82)	(United States) "Bear" (United States) Ryan Harrison (Romania) Alexandru Vasilescu (Germany) Leon Wassertheurer	SP 10	125	30th	1st
2025	(Germany) Black Falcon Team Zimmermann	70	Porsche Cayman GT4 Clubsport (981)	(Germany) David Barst (Germany) Anton Ruf (Germany) Axel Sartingen (Germany) Nils Schwenk	SP 7	59	Ret	Ret
2025	(Germany) Team Bilstein by Black Falcon	150	BMW M4 GT4 Evo (G82)	(United Kingdom) Steve Alvarez Brown (United Kingdom) Jimmy Broadbent (Netherlands) Misha Charoudin (Germany) Manuel Metzger	SP 8T	130	21st	2nd
2025	(Germany) Black Falcon Team Zimmermann	900	Porsche 911 GT3 Cup (992)	(Germany) Alexander Hardt (Germany) Thomas Kiefer (United States) Peter Ludwig (Germany) Maik Rosenberg	Cup2 Am	133	17th	1st
2025	(Germany) 48 Losch by Black Falcon	948	Porsche 911 GT3 Cup (992)	(Germany) Tobias Müller (Germany) Noah Nagelsdiek (Luxembourg) Dylan Pereira (Germany) Carlos Rivas	Cup2 Pro	135	11th	1st
2026	(Germany) Black Falcon Team EAE	5	Porsche 911 GT3 R (992.2)	(Germany) Thomas Kiefer (Turkey) Mustafa Mehmet Kaya (Italy) Gabriele Piana (Germany) Mike Stursberg	SP 9 Am	147	20th	1st
2026	(Germany) 48LOSCH Motorsport by Black Falcon	48	Porsche 911 GT3 R (992.2)	(Netherlands) "Daan Arrow" (Germany) Patrick Assenheimer (Germany) Tobias Müller (Luxembourg) Dylan Pereira	SP 9 Pro-Am	154	10th	1st
2026	(Germany) Rebel Racing by Black Falcon	177	BMW M4 GT4 Evo (G82)	(United States) Malcolm Harrison (Romania) Sergiu Nicolae (United States) Mark Smith (Romania) Alexandru Vasilescu	SP 10	121	77th	7th
2026	(Germany) AV Racing by Black Falcon	180	BMW M4 GT4 Evo (G82)	(United States) Judson Holt (United States) Dave Ogburn (United States) Denny Stripling (United States) Charles Turner	SP 10	106	102nd	8th
2026	(Germany) Black Falcon Team Fanatec	632	Porsche 911 GT3 Cup (992)	(United Kingdom) Steve Alvarez Brown (United Kingdom) Jimmy Broadbent (Netherlands) Misha Charoudin (Germany) Manuel Metzger	AT2	70	Ret	Ret
2026	(Germany) Black Falcon Team Zimmermann	900	Porsche 911 GT3 Cup (992)	(Germany) Alexander Hardt (Chile) Benjamín Hites (Germany) Benjamin Koslowski (Netherlands) Paul Meijer	Cup2 Pro	148	18th	1st
2026	(Germany) Team Liqui Moly by Black Falcon	902	Porsche 911 GT3 Cup (992)	(United States) Ryan Harrison (Germany) Noah Nagelsdiek (Austria) Raphael Rennhofer (Germany) Leon Wassertheurer	Cup2 Pro	148	19th	2nd
2026	(Germany) Black Falcon Team Zimmermann	939	Porsche 718 Cayman GT4 RS Clubsport	(Germany) Alexander Kroker (Germany) Anton Ruf (Germany) Axel Sartingen (Germany) Nils Schwenk	Cup3 Am	137	36th	3rd
