= 2013 24 Hours of Nürburgring =

Endurance motor race in Germany

2013 ADAC 24 Hours of Nürburgring

Seasons
- ← 2012 2014 →

Nürburgring 24h track (Nordschleife+GP Circuit without Mercedes-Arena)

The 2013 ADAC Zurich 24 Hours of Nürburgring was the 41st running of the 24 Hours of Nürburgring. It took place over May 19–20, 2013. The race was suspended for over 9 hours due to heavy rain.

The #9 Black Falcon team won the race on a Mercedes-Benz SLS AMG. DTM legend Bernd Schneider also won the Dubai 24 Hour, the Bathurst 12 Hour and the Spa 24 Hours the same year.

== Race results ==
Class winners in bold.

Pos	Class	No	Team	Drivers	Vehicle	Laps
1	**SP9**	**9**	**(Germany) Black Falcon**	**(Germany) Bernd Schneider (Netherlands) Jeroen Bleekemolen (United Kingdom) Sean Edwards (Denmark) Nicki Thiim**	**Mercedes-Benz SLS AMG GT3**	**88**
2	SP9	25	(Belgium) Marc VDS Racing	(Belgium) Maxime Martin (Italy) Andrea Piccini (Netherlands) Yelmer Buurman (Sweden) Richard Göransson	BMW Z4 GT3	88
3	SP9	22	(Germany) Rowe Racing	(Germany) Thomas Jäger (Germany) Jan Seyffarth (Germany) Klaus Graf (Germany) Nico Bastian	Mercedes-Benz SLS AMG GT3	87
4	SP9	23	(Germany) Rowe Racing	(Germany) Thomas Jäger (Germany) Jan Seyffarth (Germany) Lance David Arnold (Germany) Alexander Roloff	Mercedes-Benz SLS AMG GT3	87
5	SP9	1	(Russia) G-Drive Racing by Phoenix	(Germany) Mike Rockenfeller (Germany) Frank Stippler (Germany) Markus Winkelhock (Switzerland) Marcel Fässler	Audi R8 LMS Ultra	87
6	SP9	20	(Germany) BMW Team Schubert	(Germany) Martin Tomczyk (Germany) Dirk Adorf (Germany) Claudia Hürtgen (Germany) Jens Klingmann	BMW Z4 GT3	87
7	**SP7**	**18**	**(Germany) Manthey Racing**	**(Germany) Marc Lieb (Germany) Lucas Luhr (Germany) Timo Bernhard (France) Romain Dumas**	**Porsche 997 GT3-R**	**86**
8	SP9	4	(Germany) Phoenix Racing	(Germany) Frank Stippler (Germany) Michael Ammermüller (Germany) Ferdinand Stuck (Germany) Johannes Stuck	Audi R8 LMS Ultra	86
9	SP9	3	(Russia) G-Drive Racing by Phoenix	(Germany) Frank Biela (Germany) Luca Ludwig (Germany) Christer Jöns (Russia) Roman Rusinov	Audi R8 LMS Ultra	86
10	SP9	7	(United Kingdom) Aston Martin Racing	(Germany) Stefan Mücke (United Kingdom) Darren Turner (Denmark) Allan Simonsen (Portugal) Pedro Lamy	Aston Martin V12 Vantage GT3	86

== Bibliography ==
- Jörg-Richard Ufer & Tim Upietz. 24 Stunden Nürburgring Nordschleife 2013. Gruppe C Motorsport Verlag. ISBN 978-3-928540-72-8.
