= Khaled Al Qubaisi =

Emirati racing driver

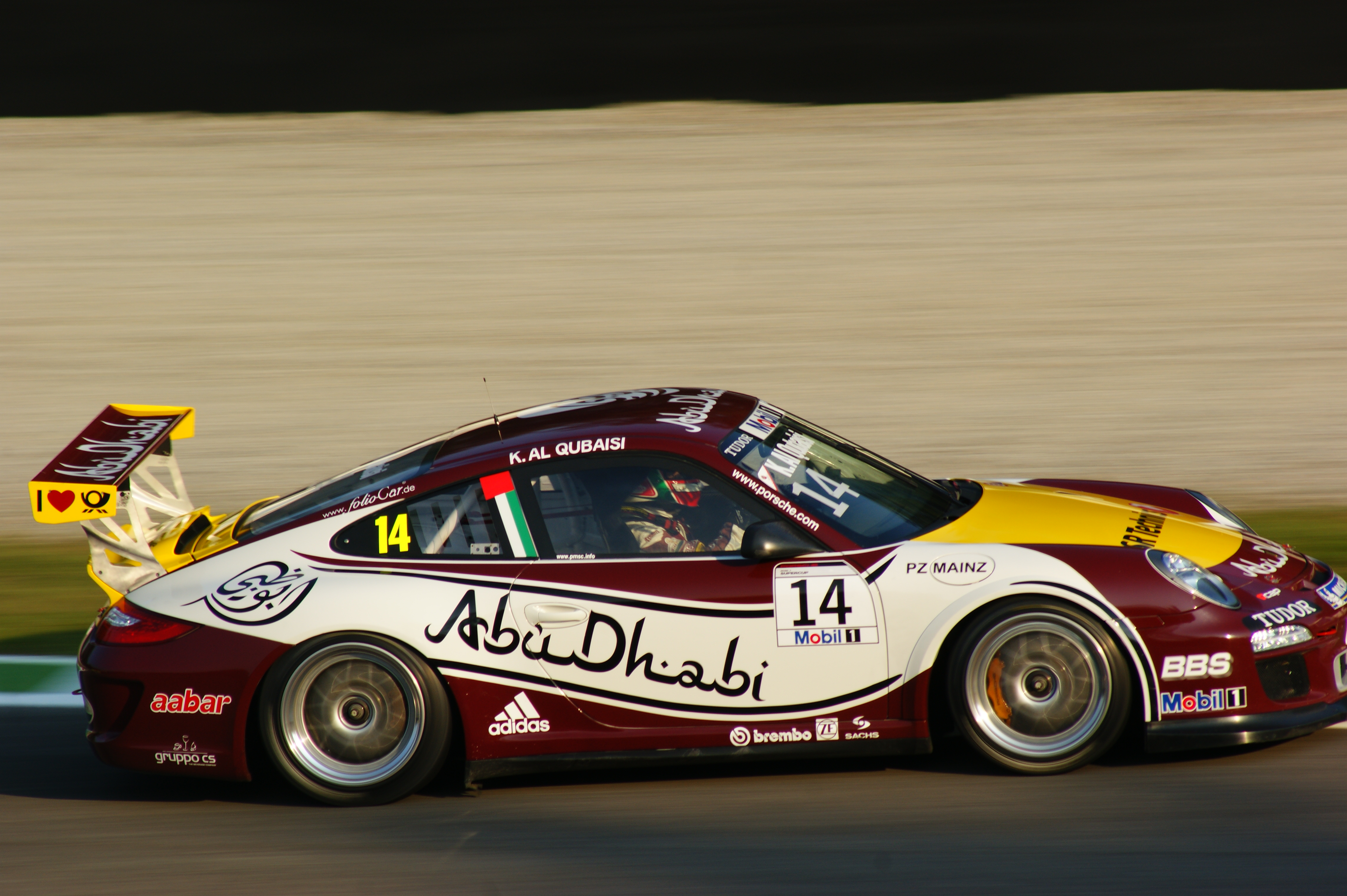
- Al Qubaisi competing at Autodromo Nazionale Monza for the 2011 Porsche Supercup
- Nationality: (United Arab Emirates) Emirati
- Born: Khaled Abdulla Al Qubaisi; 22 December 1975 (age 50) Abu Dhabi, United Arab Emirates
- Relatives: Amna Al Qubaisi (daughter); Hamda Al Qubaisi (daughter)

F3 Asian Championship career
- Debut season: 2019–20
- Current team: Abu Dhabi Racing Team
- Categorisation: FIA Silver (until 2013); FIA Bronze (2014–)
- Car number: 88
- Starts: 3
- Wins: 0
- Poles: 0
- Fastest laps: 0
- Best finish: 18th in 2019–20

Khaled Abdulla Al Qubaisi (born 22 December 1975) is an Emirati businessman and racing driver who served as the chief executive officer of Real Estate & Infrastructure Investments at Mubadala Investment Company for four years.

Al Qubaisi was a member of the Investment Committee at Mubadala, which is mandated to develop the organization's investment policies and guidelines, and to review all proposed projects and investments to ensure they are aligned with Mubadala's business objectives.

== Education ==
Al Qubaisi holds a Master of Science in Project Management (MSPM) degree from George Washington University, and a bachelor's degree in finance and operations management from Boston University. He was also awarded the CFA in 2003.

== Career ==
Al Qubaisi was the chief executive officer of Mubadala's Real Estate & Infrastructure Investments platform from 2021 to 2024. He also served as the chief executive officer of Aerospace, Renewables, and ICT where he oversaw the company's Aerospace, Renewables, Information Communications Technology, Utilities and Defense Services portfolios. Prior to this role, he also served as Chief Human Capital Officer at Mubadala, with responsibility for performance management, learning and development, employee career growth, talent acquisition and Emiratization.

Before joining Mubadala, Al Qubaisi was the Chief Investment Officer at International Capital, where he managed a diverse investment portfolio, and the execution of large-scale, multi-billion Dirham real estate projects. He was also the Head of Corporate Finance & Business Development at the National Bank of Abu Dhabi, where he focused on developing the bank's investment banking capabilities.

== Institutional overview ==
Al Qubaisi is the Chairman of the National Central Cooling Company (Tabreed). He is also the Director and Vice Chairman of Abu Dhabi Motor Sports Management and Finance House and sits on the boards of Abu Dhabi Future Energy Company (Masdar), Emirates Nuclear Energy Corporation (ENEC), Emirates Integrated Telecommunications Company (du), GLOBALFOUNDRIES, Mubadala Petroleum and Insurance House. He is also a member of CFA Institute.

== Motorsport ==
Al Qubaisi has been active in the international grand touring races since the beginning of the 2010s. His biggest accomplishments were overall victories at 2012 and 2013 Dubai 24 Hour; each driven out in Black Falcon - Mercedes-Benz SLS AMG GT3 and teammates Sean Edwards, Jeroen Bleekemolen and Thomas Jäger (2012) and Bernd Schneider (2013). In 2013, he also won the Yas Marina 12-Hour Race. He also raced three times in 24 Hours of Le Mans, with his best finish in 2014 when he finished 19th in the overall standings.

== Personal life ==
Al Qubaisi is married and has three children, two daughters, Amna and Hamda, who are also racing drivers, and a son, Abdulla.

== Racing record ==
=== Career summary ===
Season	Series	Team	Races	Wins	Poles	F/Laps	Podiums	Points	Position
2009	Porsche Supercup	Abu Dhabi Race Team	2	0	0	0	0	0	NC†
2010	Porsche Supercup	Team Abu Dhabi by Tolimit	10	0	0	0	0	6	21st
2010	Porsche GT3 Cup Challenge Middle East	Team Abu Dhabi by Tolimit	12	0	0	0	0	90	9th
2011	Porsche Supercup	Team Abu Dhabi by Tolimit	11	0	0	0	0	15	17th
2011	Porsche GT3 Cup Challenge Middle East	Tolimit Arabia	12	1	1	1	6	156	5th
2012	Porsche Supercup	Team Deutsche Post by Tolimit	2	0	0	0	0	0	NC†
2014	FIA World Endurance Championship - LMGTE Am	Proton Competition	8	0	0	0	2	121	4th
2015	FIA World Endurance Championship - LMGTE Am	Abu Dhabi Proton Racing	8	0	0	0	2	82	7th
2015	24H Series - A6	Abu Dhabi Racing Black Falcon	1	0	0	0	0	0	NC†
2016	FIA World Endurance Championship - LMGTE Am	Abu Dhabi Proton Racing	9	2	3	0	3	151	**2nd**
2016	24H Series - A6	Abu Dhabi Racing Black Falcon	1	0	0	0	0	0	NC†
2017	FIA World Endurance Championship - LMGTE Am	Gulf Racing	1	0	0	0	1	18	9th
2017	24H Series - A6	Black Falcon	1	0	0	1	0	0	NC†
2018	24H GT Series - A6	Black Falcon	1	0	0	0	0	0	NC†
2018–19	FIA World Endurance Championship - LMGTE Am	Dempsey-Proton Racing	3	0	1	0	1	15	18th
2019	24H GT Series - A6	Abu Dhabi Racing Black Falcon	1	0	0	0	0	0	NC†
2019–20	FIA World Endurance Championship	Dempsey-Proton Racing	2	0	0	1	1	23	21st
2019–20	F3 Asian Championship	Abu Dhabi Racing UAE	3	0	0	0	0	2	18th
2020	24H GT Series - GT3	Black Falcon	1	1	0	0	0	30	**2nd**
2021	F3 Asian Championship	Abu Dhabi Racing by Prema	6	0	0	0	0	0	25th
2021	24H GT Series - GT3	Team HRT Bilstein	1	0	0	0	1	24	NC
2021	FIA World Endurance Championship - LMGTE Am	Dempsey-Proton Racing	2	0	0	0	0	0.5	25th
2022	Formula Regional Asian Championship	Abu Dhabi Racing by Prema	15	0	0	0	0	0	35th
2022	24H GT Series - GT3	Abu Dhabi Racing by HRT Bilstein							
2022–23	Middle East Trophy - GT3	Abu Dhabi Racing by HRT Bilstein							

^{†} As Al Qubaisi was a guest driver, he was ineligible to score points.

=== Complete Formula Regional Asian Championship results ===
(key) (Races in bold indicate pole position) (Races in italics indicate the fastest lap of top ten finishers)

Year	Entrant	1	2	3	4	5	6	7	8	9	10	11	12	13	14	15	DC	Points
2019–20	Abu Dhabi Racing UAE	SEP; 1	SEP; 2	SEP; 3	DUB; 1	DUB; 2	DUB; 3	ABU; 1; 13	ABU; 2; 10	ABU; 3; 13	SEP; 1	SEP; 2	SEP; 3	CHA; 1	CHA; 2	CHA; 3	18th	2
2021	Abu Dhabi Racing by Prema	DUB; 1	DUB; 2	DUB; 3	ABU; 1	ABU; 2	ABU; 3	ABU; 1	ABU; 2	ABU; 3	DUB; 1; 19	DUB; 2; 15	DUB; 3; 18	ABU; 1; 15	ABU; 2; 16	ABU; 3; 17	25th	0
2022	Abu Dhabi Racing by Prema	ABU; 1; 16	ABU; 2 Ret	ABU; 3; 19	DUB; 1; 22	DUB; 2; 20	DUB; 3; 20	DUB; 1; 22	DUB; 2; 23	DUB; 3; 23	DUB; 1; 23	DUB; 2; 23	DUB; 3; 21	ABU; 1; 24	ABU; 2; 22	ABU; 3 Ret	35th	0

=== Complete 24 Hours of Le Mans results ===
Year	Team	Co-Drivers	Car	Class	Laps	Pos.	Class Pos.
2013	(United Kingdom) JMW Motorsport	(Italy) Andrea Bertolini (Saudi Arabia) Abdulaziz Al-Faisal	Ferrari 458 Italia GT2	LMGTE; Pro	300	34th	10th
2014	(Germany) Proton Competition	(Austria) Klaus Bachler (Germany) Christian Ried	Porsche 911 RSR	LMGTE; Am	332	21st	**2nd**
2015	(Germany) Abu Dhabi-Proton Racing	(Austria) Klaus Bachler (Germany) Christian Ried	Porsche 911 RSR	LMGTE; Am	44	DNF	DNF
2016	(United Arab Emirates) Abu Dhabi-Proton Racing	(United States) Patrick Long (Denmark) David Heinemeier Hansson	Porsche 911 RSR	LMGTE; Am	330	28th	**3rd**
2017	(Germany) Proton Competition	(Austria) Klaus Bachler (Belgium) Stéphane Lémeret	Porsche 911 RSR	LMGTE; Am	46	DNF	DNF
2018	(Germany) Dempsey-Proton Racing	(Italy) Matteo Cairoli (Italy) Giorgio Roda	Porsche 911 RSR	LMGTE; Am	225	DNF	DNF
