= Andreas Simonsen =

Swedish racing driver

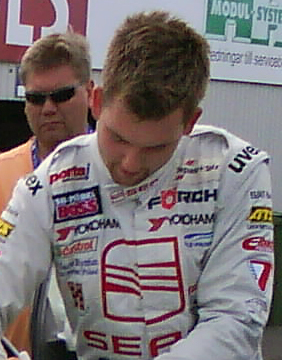
- Andreas Simonsen, 2009.
- Nationality: (Sweden) Swedish
- Born: 8 October 1989 (age 37) Gothenburg, Sweden

ADAC GT Masters career
- Current team: Heico Junior Team
- Categorisation: FIA Silver (until 2013); FIA Gold (2014–)

Andreas Mikael Simonsen (born 8 October 1989) is a Swedish auto racing driver from Gothenburg, who mainly competed in the German GT championship.

== Racing record ==
=== FIA GT Series results ===
Year	Class	Team	Car	1	2	3	4	5	6	7	8	9	10	11	12	Pos.	Points
2013	Pro-Am	HTP Gravity Charouz	Mercedes-Benz	NOG; QR; 12	NOG; CR; 16	ZOL; QR; 6	ZOL; CR; 7	ZAN; QR; 7	ZAN; QR; 12	SVK; QR; 6	SVK; CR; 1	NAV; QR; 4	NAV; CR; 4	TBA; QR; 6	TBA; CR; Ret	1st	136
