= Michael Christensen (racing driver) =

Danish Porsche factory racing driver

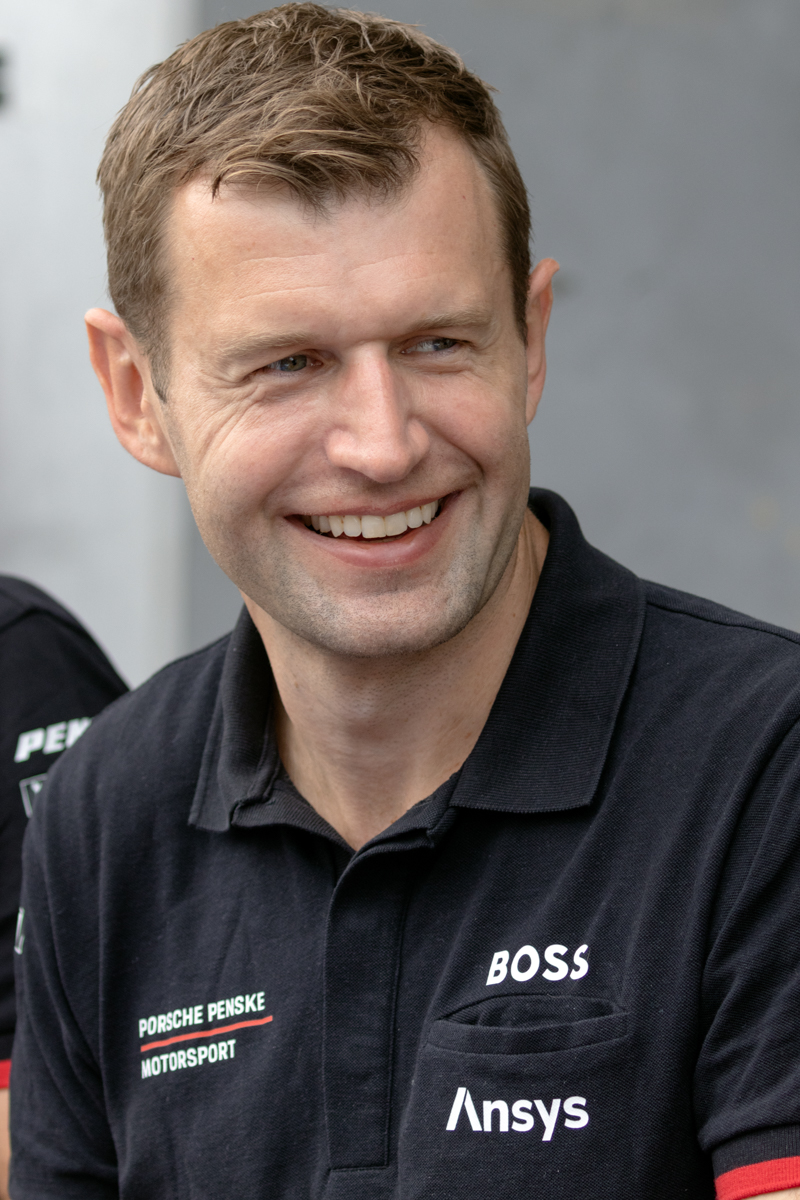
- Christensen at the 2024 6 Hours of Fuji
- Nationality: (Denmark) Danish
- Born: Michael Klitgaard Christensen; 28 August 1990 (age 36) Karlslunde, Denmark

FIA World Endurance Championship career
- Debut season: 2015
- Current team: Porsche Penske Motorsport
- Categorisation: FIA Silver (until 2013); FIA Platinum (2014–)
- Former teams: Porsche Team Manthey, Dempsey-Proton Racing, Porsche GT Team
- Starts: 72
- Wins: 8
- Poles: 11
- Fastest laps: 2
- Best finish: 1st in 2018–19

Previous series
- 2013 2012 2011 2010–11 2008–09: Porsche Supercup; Porsche Carrera Cup Germany; ADAC GT Masters; GP3 Series; Formula BMW Europe

Michael Klitgaard Christensen (born 28 August 1990) is a Danish racing driver. He is currently competing in the FIA World Endurance Championship for Porsche in the Hypercar class in the No. 5 Porsche 963.

== Early career ==
=== Karting ===
Born in Karlslunde, Christensen had a very successful karting career, winning the 2004 Nordic ICA Junior Championship. The following year he gathered both Nordic and European titles in ICA Junior class. For 2006, Christensen graduated to Formula A and he achieved a second place in the Formula A World Championship and was twice champion in the German Kart Championship Winner of the Macau Int. Kart Grand prix Formula A. In 2007, he repeated as German Kart Champion and also won the KF1 South Garda Winter Cup.

=== Formula BMW Europe ===
Christensen made his open-wheel racing debut in the 2008 Formula BMW Europe season at Barcelona which supported the 2008 Spanish Grand Prix, where he was involved in a potentially serious incident, flipping his car. He finished the season in sixth place and as the top rookie in the rookie standings.

Christensen moved to Mücke Motorsport for the 2009 season. He started the season as the strongest candidate to win the championship, and a victory in the first race of the season was promising. He finished the season in fourth place, although he lost results from five races including three wins, after his team lost an appeal over a breach of technical regulations was rejected by the FIA.

=== GP3 Series ===
In 2010, Christensen became the first driver to join MW Arden for the 2010 GP3 Series season.

== Sportscar career ==
=== Porsche ===
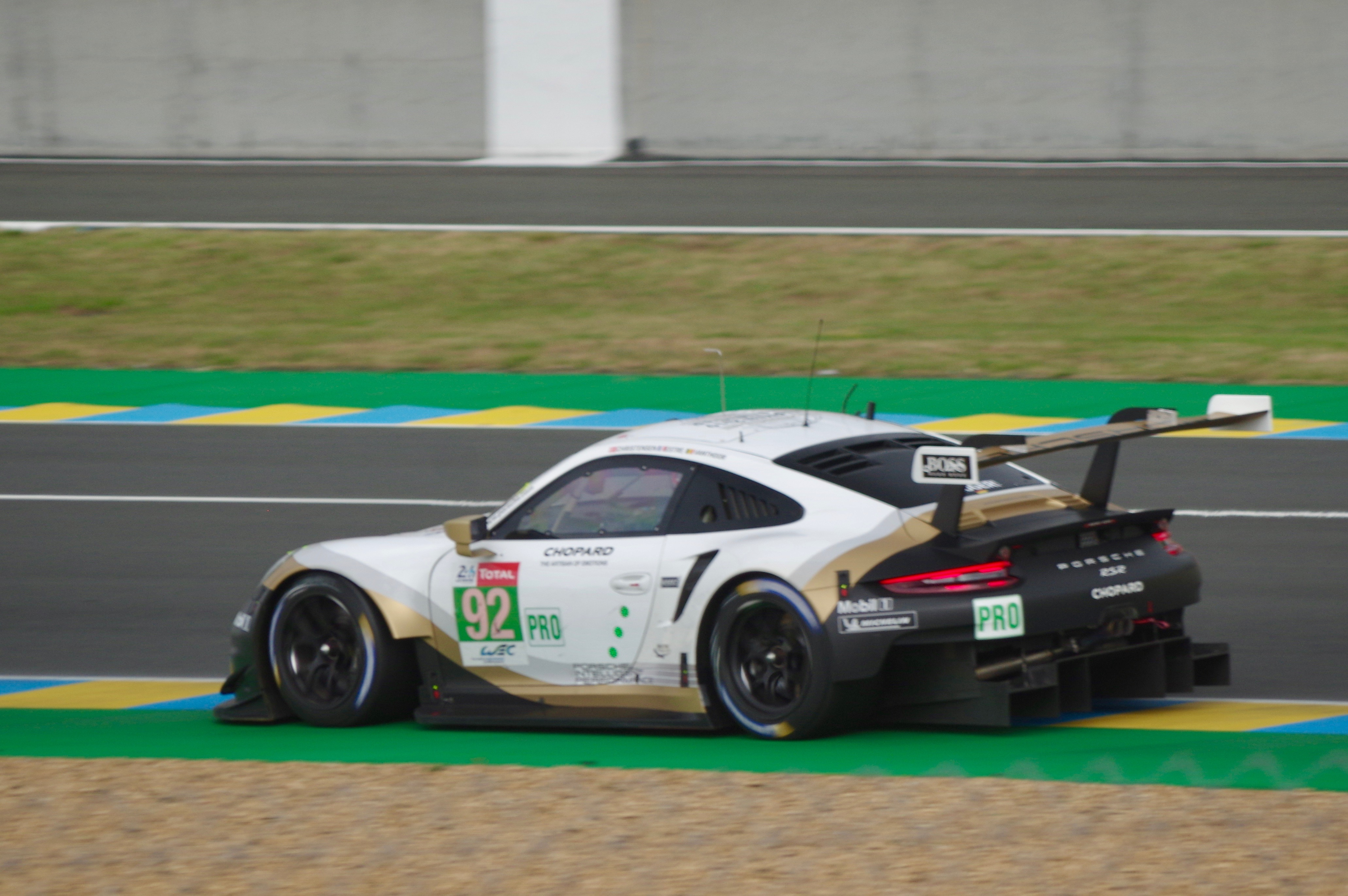
Christensen driving at the 2019 24 Hours of Le Mans in a Porsche 992 RSR

In 2012, Christensen joined the Porsche young driver program. He resulted seventh in the 2012 Porsche Carrera Cup Germany and sixth in the 2013 Porsche Supercup.

Christensen became a factory driver in 2014, racing in the WeatherTech SportsCar Championship joining Patrick Long in the GTLM class, winning 12 Hours of Sebring and North American Endurance Cup. In 2015, he competed in the FIA World Endurance Championship together with Richard Lietz, joining the Manthey Racing team in the GTE-Pro class. Winning the manufactures championship, and finishing fourth in the drivers championship. In the 2018–2019 FIA World Endurance Championship, he in succeeded winning 24 Hours of Le Mans for Porsche.

== Hypercar career ==
For the 2023 World Endurance Championship season, Christensen was named in the lineup for Porsche Penske Motorsport, partnering Dane Cameron and Frédéric Makowiecki. For the 2024 WEC season, Christensen would again drive the Porsche 963 for Penske, alongside Makowiecki and Matt Campbell.

== Personal life ==
Christensen's hobbies are improving on personal fitness, and training, while his favourite driver is Michael Schumacher, and his favourite circuit is the Nürburgring.

== Racing record ==
=== Career summary ===
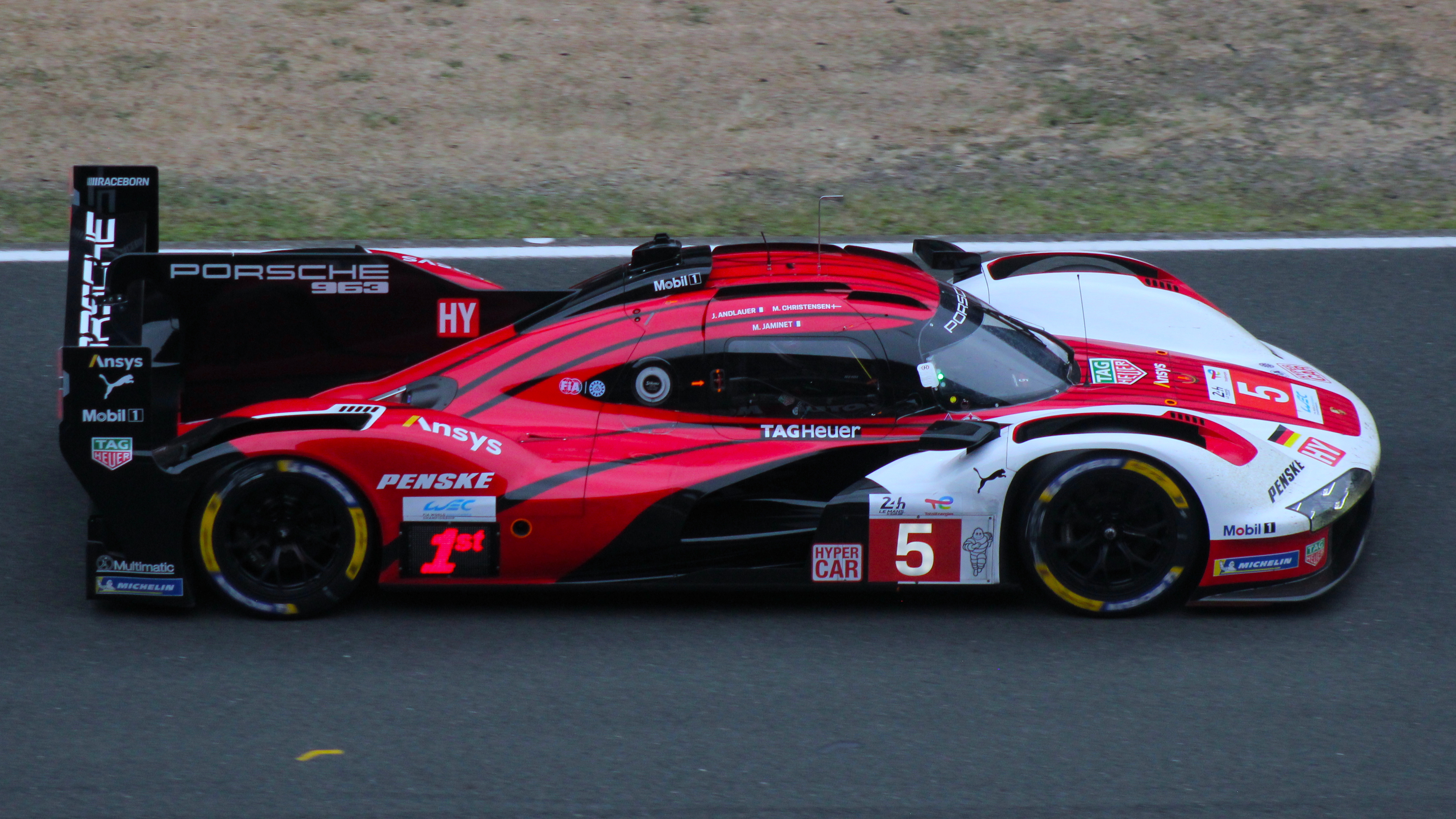
Christensen's No. 5 car at the 2025 24 Hours of Le Mans

Season	Series	Team	Races	Wins	Poles	FLaps	Podiums	Points	Position
2008	Formula BMW Europe	Räikkönen Robertson Racing	15	0	0	1	1	158	6th
2008	Formula BMW Pacific	Motaworld Racing	1	0	0	0	1	0	NC†
2008	Formula BMW World Final	Josef Kaufmann Racing	1	0	0	0	1	0	**2nd**
2009	Formula BMW Europe	Mücke Motorsport	16	4	5	4	6	233	4th
2010	GP3 Series	MW Arden	16	0	0	0	0	0	31st
2011	GP3 Series	RSC Mücke Motorsport	16	0	0	1	2	19	11th
2011	ADAC GT Masters	Vulcan Racing – Mintgen Motorsport	6	0	0	0	0	0	NC
2012	Porsche Carrera Cup Germany	Konrad Motorsport	16	1	0	1	2	148	7th
2012	Porsche Supercup	Konrad Motorsport	2	0	0	0	0	0	NC†
2013	Porsche Supercup	DAMS	9	1	1	1	3	95	6th
2013	ADAC GT Masters	Tonino powered by Herberth Motorsport	2	0	0	0	0	20	23rd
2013	ADAC GT Masters	Team Geyer & Weinig EDV-Unternehmensberatung; Schütz Motorsport	2	0	0	0	0	20	23rd
2013	American Le Mans Series – GT	CORE Autosport	1	0	0	0	0	7	29th
2013	Rolex Sports Car Series – GT	Konrad Motorsport/Orbit	1	0	0	0	0	16	62nd
2013	Porsche Carrera Cup Germany	Team 75 Motorsport GmbH	2	0	0	0	1	0	NC†
2013	24 Hours of Nürburgring – SP9	Pinta Team Manthey	1	0	0	0	0	N/A	?
2014	IMSA SportsCar Championship – GTLM	Porsche North America	10	1	1	0	4	303	6th
2015	FIA World Endurance Championship – LMGTE Pro	Porsche Team Manthey	7	3	0	1	4	127	**3rd**
2015	24 Hours of Le Mans – LMGTE Pro	Porsche Team Manthey	1	0	0	0	0	N/A	5th
2015	IMSA SportsCar Championship – GTLM	Porsche North America	2	0	0	0	1	56	17th
2015	24 Hours of Nürburgring – SP-Pro	Wochenspiegel Team Manthey	1	0	?	?	0	N/A	DNF
2016	FIA World Endurance Championship – LMGTE Pro	Dempsey-Proton Racing	9	0	0	0	0	74	8th
2016	24 Hours of Le Mans – LMGTE Pro	Dempsey-Proton Racing	1	0	0	0	0	N/A	8th
2016	IMSA SportsCar Championship – GTLM	Porsche North America	3	0	0	0	2	89	13th
2016	24 Hours of Nürburgring – SP9	Manthey Racing	1	0	0	0	0	N/A	DNF
2017	FIA World Endurance Championship – LMGTE Pro	Porsche GT Team	9	0	1	0	3	67	11th
2017	24 Hours of Le Mans – LMGTE Pro	Porsche GT Team	1	0	0	0	0	N/A	DNF
2017	IMSA SportsCar Championship – GTD	Alegra Motorsports	5	1	0	0	2	131	23rd
2017	Blancpain GT Series Endurance Cup	KÜS TEAM75 Bernhard	1	0	0	0	0	12	22nd
2017	Intercontinental GT Challenge	KÜS TEAM75 Bernhard	1	0	0	0	0	12	10th
2017	24 Hours of Nürburgring – SP9	Frikadelli Racing	1	0	0	0	0	N/A	6th
2018	Pirelli World Challenge	Alegra Motorsports	19	2	1	1	9	364	**3rd**
2018	SprintX GT Championship Series	Alegra Motorsports	10	1	1	0	6	198	**2nd**
2018	24 Hours of Le Mans – LMGTE Pro	Porsche GT Team	1	1	0	0	1	N/A	**1st**
2018	24 Hours of Nürburgring – SP9	KÜS Team75 Bernhard	1	0	0	0	0	N/A	19th
2018–19	FIA World Endurance Championship – LMGTE Pro	Porsche GT Team	8	2	1	1	6	155	**1st**
2019	Blancpain GT Series Endurance Cup	GPX Racing	1	1	0	0	1	25	10th
2019	Intercontinental GT Challenge	GPX Racing	2	1	0	0	2	40	11th
2019	24 Hours of Le Mans – LMGTE Pro	Porsche GT Team	1	1	0	0	0	N/A	9th
2019	24 Hours of Nürburgring – SP9	Manthey Racing	1	0	0	0	1	N/A	DSQ
2019–20	FIA World Endurance Championship – LMGTE Pro	Porsche GT Team	8	2	3	0	6	148	**3rd**
2020	GT World Challenge Europe Endurance Cup	KCMG	1	0	0	0	0	2	33rd
2020	Intercontinental GT Challenge	KCMG	1	0	0	0	0	0	NC
2020	24 Hours of Le Mans – LMGTE Pro	Porsche GT Team	1	0	0	0	0	N/A	6th
2021	FIA World Endurance Championship – LMGTE Pro	Porsche GT Team	3	0	2	0	3	88	5th
2021	24 Hours of Le Mans – LMGTE Pro	Porsche GT Team	1	0	0	0	1	N/A	**3rd**
2021	IMSA SportsCar Championship – GTLM	WeatherTech Racing	1	0	0	0	1	348	11th
2021	GT World Challenge Europe Endurance Cup	Schnabl Engineering	1	0	0	0	0	4	27th
2021	Intercontinental GT Challenge	Schnabl Engineering	1	0	0	0	0	0	NC
2021	24 Hours of Nürburgring – SP9	Manthey Racing	1	1	0	0	1	N/A	**1st**
2022	FIA World Endurance Championship – LMGTE Pro	Porsche GT Team	6	1	2	0	4	132	**2nd**
2022	24 Hours of Le Mans – LMGTE Pro	Porsche GT Team	1	0	0	1	0	N/A	4th
2022	GT World Challenge Europe Endurance Cup	GPX Martini Racing	1	0	0	0	0	6	29th
2022	Intercontinental GT Challenge	GPX Martini Racing	1	0	0	0	0	*	*
2022	24 Hours of Nürburgring -SP9	Manthey Racing	1	0	0	0	0	N/A	DNF
2023	FIA World Endurance Championship – Hypercar	Porsche Penske Motorsport	7	0	0	0	0	61	7th
2023	IMSA SportsCar Championship – GTP	Porsche Penske Motorsport	2	0	0	0	0	556	18th
2023	24 Hours of Le Mans – Hypercar	Porsche Penske Motorsport	1	0	0	0	0	N/A	9th
2023	24 Hours of Nürburgring – SP9	Manthey EMA	1	0	0	0	0	N/A	DNF
2024	FIA World Endurance Championship – Hypercar	Porsche Penske Motorsport	8	0	2	0	4	104	5th
2024	IMSA SportsCar Championship – GTD Pro	AO Racing	4	1	1	0	2	1208	17th
2025	FIA World Endurance Championship – Hypercar	Porsche Penske Motorsport	6	0	0	0	1	34	17th
2025	IMSA SportsCar Championship – GTD Pro	AO Racing	1	0	0	0	0	256	32nd
2026	Nürburgring Langstrecken-Serie - SP9	Hankook Competition							
2026	Nürburgring Langstrecken-Serie - SP9	Dinamic GT							
2026	24 Hours of Nürbugring - SP9	Dinamic GT	1	0	0	0	0	N/A	5th
2026	IMSA SportsCar Championship - GTD Pro	Manthey Racing	1	0	0	0	0	210	43rd

† – As Christensen was a guest driver, he was ineligible for points. ^{*} Season still in progress.

=== Complete GP3 Series results ===
(key) (Races in bold indicate pole position) (Races in italics indicate fastest lap)

Year	Entrant	1	2	3	4	5	6	7	8	9	10	11	12	13	14	15	16	DC	Points
2010	MW Arden	CAT; FEA; Ret	CAT; SPR; 16	IST; FEA; 13	IST; SPR; 11	VAL; FEA; Ret	VAL; SPR; 14	SIL; FEA; Ret	SIL; SPR; 15	HOC; FEA; Ret	HOC; SPR; 10	HUN; FEA; 10	HUN; SPR; Ret	SPA; FEA; 10	SPA; SPR; 23	MNZ; FEA; 15	MNZ; SPR; 10	31st	0
2011	RSC Mücke Motorsport	IST; FEA; 7	IST; SPR; 2	CAT; FEA; 18	CAT; SPR; 12	VAL; FEA; Ret	VAL; SPR; Ret	SIL; FEA; Ret	SIL; SPR; 13	NÜR; FEA; 26†	NÜR; SPR; 12	HUN; FEA; 2	HUN; SPR; 13	SPA; FEA; 15	SPA; SPR; 4	MNZ; FEA; 12	MNZ; SPR; 11	11th	19

=== Complete Porsche Supercup results ===
(key) (Races in bold indicate pole position) (Races in italics indicate fastest lap)

Year	Team	1	2	3	4	5	6	7	8	9	10	DC	Points
2012	Konrad Motorsport	BHR	BHR	MON; 20	VAL	SIL	HOC; 8	HUN	HUN	SPA	MNZ	NC†	0†
2013	DAMS	CAT; 5	MON; 25	SIL; 3	**NÜR**; 1	HUN; 10	SPA; 3	MNZ; 8	YMC; 10	YMC; 7		6th	95

^{†} As Christensen was a guest driver, he was ineligible to score points.

=== Complete 24 Hours of Nürburgring results ===
Year	Team	Co-Drivers	Car	Class	Laps	Pos.	Class Pos.
2013	(Germany) Pinta Team Manthey	(Austria) Klaus Bachler (Germany) Michael Illbruck (Germany) Robert Renauer	Porsche 911 GT3 R (997)	SP9	?	DNF	DNF
2015	(Germany) Wochenspiegel Team Manthey	(Germany) Oliver Kainz (Germany) Jochen Krumbach (Germany) Georg Weiss	Porsche 911 GT3 RSR	SP-Pro	23	DNF	DNF
2016	(Germany) Manthey Racing	(Germany) Jörg Bergmeister (Austria) Richard Lietz (France) Frédéric Makowiecki	Porsche 911 GT3 R (991)	SP9	100	DNF	DNF
2017	(Germany) Frikadelli Racing Team	(Austria) Klaus Bachler (Austria) Norbert Siedler (Germany) Lucas Luhr	Porsche 911 GT3 R (991)	SP9	157	6th	6th
2018	(Germany) KÜS Team75 Bernhard	(Germany) Jörg Bergmeister (Italy) Matteo Cairoli (Germany) André Lotterer	Porsche 911 GT3 R (991)	SP9	128	21st	19th
2019	(Germany) Manthey Racing	(New Zealand) Earl Bamber (France) Kévin Estre (Belgium) Laurens Vanthoor	Porsche 911 GT3 R (991.2)	SP9	156	DSQ	DSQ
2021	(Germany) Manthey Racing	(Italy) Matteo Cairoli (France) Kévin Estre	Porsche 911 GT3 R (991.2)	SP9	59	**1st**	**1st**
2022	(Germany) Manthey Racing	(France) Kévin Estre (France) Frédéric Makowiecki (Belgium) Laurens Vanthoor	Porsche 911 GT3 R (991.2)	SP9	22	DNF	DNF
2023	(Germany) Manthey EMA	(France) Kévin Estre (France) Frédéric Makowiecki (Austria) Thomas Preining	Porsche 911 GT3 R (992)	SP9	62	DNF	DNF
2026	(Italy) Dinamic GT	(Denmark) Bastian Buus (Netherlands) Loek Hartog (Germany) Joel Sturm	Porsche 911 GT3 R (992.2)	SP9	155	6th	5th

=== Complete IMSA SportsCar Championship results ===
(key) (Races in bold indicate pole position) (Races in italics indicate fastest lap)

Year	Entrant	Class	Chassis	Engine	1	2	3	4	5	6	7	8	9	10	11	12	Rank	Points	Ref
2014	Porsche North America	GTLM	Porsche 911 RSR	Porsche 4.0 L Flat-6	DAY; 9	**SEB**; 1	LBH; 5	LGA; 8	WGL; 8	MOS; 9	IMS; 3	ELK; 5	VIR; 8	COA; 3	PET; 2		6th	303	
2015	Porsche North America	GTLM	Porsche 911 RSR	Porsche 4.0 L Flat-6	DAY; 7	SEB	LBH	LGA; 3	WGL	MOS	ELK	VIR	COA	PET			17th	56	
2016	Porsche North America	GTLM	Porsche 911 RSR	Porsche 4.0 L Flat-6	DAY; 3	SEB; 3	LBH	LGA	WGL	MOS	LIM	ELK	VIR	COA	PET; 5		13th	89	
2017	Alegra Motorsports	GTD	Porsche 911 GT3 R	Porsche 4.0 L Flat-6	DAY; 1	SEB; 10	LBH; 12	COA	DET	WGL; 7	MOS	LIM	ELK	VIR	LGA	PET; 2	23rd	131	
2021	WeatherTech Racing	GTLM	Porsche 911 RSR-19	Porsche 4.2 L Flat-6	DAY	SEB	DET	WGL	WGL	LIM	ELK	LGA	LBH	VIR	PET; 2		11th	348	
2023	Porsche Penske Motorsport	GTP	Porsche 963	Porsche 9RD 4.6 L V8	DAY; 7	SEB; 5	LBH	LGA	WGL	MOS	ELK	IMS	PET				18th	556	
2024	AO Racing	GTD Pro	Porsche 911 GT3 R (992)	Porsche 4.2 L Flat-6	**DAY**; 2	SEB; 9	LGA	DET	WGL	MOS	ELK	VIR	IMS; 1	PET; 11			17th	1208	
2025	AO Racing	GTD Pro	Porsche 911 GT3 R (992)	Porsche 4.2 L Flat-6	DAY	SEB	LGA	DET	WGL	MOS	ELK	VIR	IMS	PET; 8			32nd	256	
2026	Manthey Racing	GTD Pro	Porsche 911 GT3 R (992.2)	Porsche 4.2 L Flat-6	DAY	SEB	LGA	DET	WGL; 12	MOS	ELK	VIR	IMS	PET			43rd	210	

=== Complete FIA World Endurance Championship results ===
(key) (Races in bold indicate pole position) (Races in italics indicate fastest lap)

Year	Entrant	Class	Chassis	Engine	1	2	3	4	5	6	7	8	9	Rank	Points
2015	Porsche Team Manthey	LMGTE Pro	Porsche 911 RSR	Porsche 4.0 L Flat-6	SIL; 2	SPA	LMS; 7	NÜR; 1	COA; 1	FUJ; 4	SHA; 1	BHR; 5		3rd	127
2016	Dempsey-Proton Racing	LMGTE Pro	Porsche 911 RSR	Porsche 4.0 L Flat-6	SIL; 9	SPA; 4	LMS; 6	NÜR; 6	MEX; 6	COA; 6	FUJ; 7	SHA; 6	BHR; 7	8th	74
2017	Porsche GT Team	LMGTE Pro	Porsche 911 RSR	Porsche 4.0 L Flat-6	SIL; Ret	SPA; 6	LMS; Ret	**NÜR**; 3	MEX; 5	COA; 2	FUJ; 3	SHA; Ret	BHR; Ret	11th	67
2018–19	Porsche GT Team	LMGTE Pro	Porsche 911 RSR	Porsche 4.0 L Flat-6	SPA; 2	LMS; 1	SIL; 3	FUJ; 1	SHA; 3	**SEB**; 5	SPA; 3	LMS; 5		1st	155
2019–20	Porsche GT Team	LMGTE Pro	Porsche 911 RSR-19	Porsche 4.2 L Flat-6	SIL; 2	FUJ; 2	**SHA**; 2	BHR; 7	COA; 2	**SPA**; 1	LMS; 11	**BHR**; 1		3rd	148
2021	Porsche GT Team	LMGTE Pro	Porsche 911 RSR-19	Porsche 4.2 L Flat-6	SPA	**ALG**; 3	MNZ	LMS; 2	BHR	**BHR**; 2				5th	88
2022	Porsche GT Team	LMGTE Pro	Porsche 911 RSR-19	Porsche 4.2 L Flat-6	**SEB**; 1	SPA; 2	LMS; 4	MNZ; 4	**FUJ**; 3	BHR; 3				2nd	132
2023	Porsche Penske Motorsport	Hypercar	Porsche 963	Porsche 4.6 L Turbo V8	SEB; 5	ALG; 10	SPA; 4	LMS; 7	MNZ; 4	FUJ; 12	BHR; 7			7th	61
2024	Porsche Penske Motorsport	Hypercar	Porsche 963	Porsche 4.6 L Turbo V8	**QAT**; 3	IMO; 3	**SPA**; Ret	LMS; 6	SÃO; 3	COA; 7	FUJ; Ret	BHR; 2		5th	104
2025	Porsche Penske Motorsport	Hypercar	Porsche 963	Porsche 4.6 L Turbo V8	QAT; 10	IMO; 11	SPA; 12	LMS; 6	SÃO; 3	COA; 10	FUJ	BHR		17th	34

=== Complete 24 Hours of Le Mans results ===
Year	Team	Co-Drivers	Car	Class	Laps	Pos.	Class Pos.
2015	(Germany) Porsche Team Manthey	(Austria) Richard Lietz (Germany) Jörg Bergmeister	Porsche 911 RSR	GTE; Pro	327	30th	5th
2016	(Germany) Dempsey-Proton Racing	(Austria) Philipp Eng (Austria) Richard Lietz	Porsche 911 RSR	GTE; Pro	329	31st	8th
2017	(Germany) Porsche GT Team	(France) Kévin Estre (Germany) Dirk Werner	Porsche 911 RSR	GTE; Pro	179	DNF	DNF
2018	(Germany) Porsche GT Team	(France) Kévin Estre (Belgium) Laurens Vanthoor	Porsche 911 RSR	GTE; Pro	344	15th	**1st**
2019	(Germany) Porsche GT Team	(France) Kévin Estre (Belgium) Laurens Vanthoor	Porsche 911 RSR	GTE; Pro	337	29th	9th
2020	(Germany) Porsche GT Team	(France) Kévin Estre (Belgium) Laurens Vanthoor	Porsche 911 RSR-19	GTE; Pro	331	35th	6th
2021	(Germany) Porsche GT Team	(France) Kévin Estre (Switzerland) Neel Jani	Porsche 911 RSR-19	GTE; Pro	344	22nd	**3rd**
2022	(Germany) Porsche GT Team	(France) Kévin Estre (Belgium) Laurens Vanthoor	Porsche 911 RSR-19	GTE; Pro	348	31st	4th
2023	(Germany) Porsche Penske Motorsport	(United States) Dane Cameron (France) Frédéric Makowiecki	Porsche 963	Hypercar	325	16th	9th
2024	(Germany) Porsche Penske Motorsport	(Australia) Matt Campbell (France) Frédéric Makowiecki	Porsche 963	Hypercar	311	6th	6th
2025	(Germany) Porsche Penske Motorsport	(France) Julien Andlauer (France) Mathieu Jaminet	Porsche 963	Hypercar	386	6th	6th

=== Complete 24 Hours of Spa results ===
Year	Team	Co-Drivers	Car	Class	Laps	Pos.	Class Pos.
2017	(Germany) KÜS Team75 Bernhard	(France) Kévin Estre (Belgium) Laurens Vanthoor	Porsche 911 GT3 R (991)	Pro	546	4th	4th
2019	(United Arab Emirates) GPX Racing	(France) Kévin Estre (Austria) Richard Lietz	Porsche 911 GT3 R (991.2)	Pro	363	**1st**	**1st**
2020	(Hong Kong) KCMG	(France) Kévin Estre (Austria) Richard Lietz	Porsche 911 GT3 R (991.2)	Pro	522	13th	13th
2021	(Germany) Schnabl Engineering	(France) Frédéric Makowiecki (Norway) Dennis Olsen	Porsche 911 GT3 R (991.2)	Pro	254	DNF	DNF
2022	(United Arab Emirates) GPX Martini Racing	(France) Kévin Estre (Austria) Richard Lietz	Porsche 911 GT3 R (991.2)	Pro	221	DNF	DNF

Sporting positions
Preceded by James Calado; Alessandro Pier Guidi	World Endurance GT Drivers' Championship; Champion; 2018–19; With: Kevin Estre	Succeeded by Marco Sørensen; Nicki Thiim
