= 2013 Porsche Carrera Cup Germany =

Motor racing competition

Seasons
- ← 2012 2014 →

The 2013 Porsche Carrera Cup Germany season was the 28th German Porsche Carrera Cup season. It began on 4 May at Hockenheim and finished on 4 October at the same circuit, after seventeen races, with two races at each event bar Round 3. It ran as a support championship for the 2013 DTM season. Frenchman Kévin Estre won the championship for Hermes ATTEMPTO Racing. British Tolimit Motorsport driver Sean Edwards was killed on 15 October 2013 at Queensland Raceway in Willowbank, Australia, while instructing a member of the public at a private test session.

== Teams and drivers ==
Team	No.	Drivers	Class	Rounds
(Germany) Team Deutsche Post by Project 1	1	(United Kingdom) Sean Edwards	A	1–8
(Germany) Team Deutsche Post by Project 1	2	(United States) Sean Johnston	A	1–8
(Germany) Team Deutsche Post by Project 1	3	(Switzerland) Jeffrey Schmidt	A	All
(Germany) Land – Motorsport	4	(Netherlands) Hoevert Vos	B	1
(Germany) Land – Motorsport	4	(Netherlands) Ronald van de Laar	B	5–6, 8
(Germany) Land – Motorsport	4	(United States) Patrick Lindsey	A	9
(Germany) Land – Motorsport	7	(Germany) Luca Stolz	A	1, 3–9
(Germany) Land – Motorsport	7	(Austria) Andreas Mayerl	A	2
(Germany) Land – Motorsport	47	(Germany) Harmann Speck	B	5
(Germany) FE Racing by Land – Motorsport	5	(Netherlands) Jaap van Lagen	A	All
(Germany) FE Racing by Land – Motorsport	6	(Netherlands) Wolf Nathan	A	All
(Germany) FE Racing by Land – Motorsport	43	(Netherlands) Daan Meijer	A	8
(Austria) Konrad Motorsport	8	(Germany) Christian Engelhart	A	All
(Austria) Konrad Motorsport	9	(Germany) Felipe Fernández Laser	A	1–4
(Austria) Konrad Motorsport	9	(Austria) Christopher Zöchling	A	5–10
(Austria) Konrad Motorsport	29	(Switzerland) Rolf Ineichen	B	1, 3–9
(Austria) Konrad Motorsport	29	(Austria) Christopher Zöchling	A	2
(Germany) Aust Motorsport	10	(Austria) Norbert Siedler	A	All
(Germany) Aust Motorsport	11	(Germany) Elia Erhart	A	1–8
(Poland) FÖRCH Racing by Lukas Motorsport	12	(Poland) Robert Lukas	A	All
(Poland) FÖRCH Racing by Lukas Motorsport	14	(United States) Connor de Phillippi	A	All
(Poland) FÖRCH Racing by Lukas Motorsport	15	(Germany) Florian Scholze	A	All
(Germany) Team ZaWotec Racing	16	(Germany) Marco Klein	A	All
(Germany) Team ZaWotec Racing	17	(Austria) Sascha Halek	A	All
(Netherlands) Team Bleekemolen	19	(Netherlands) Bas Schothorst	A	All
(Netherlands) Team Bleekemolen	21	(Netherlands) Pieter Schothorst	A	All
(Netherlands) Team Bleekemolen	42	(Netherlands) Jeroen Mul	A	8–9
(Germany) Team GT3 Kasco	22	(Germany) Georg Engelhardt	B	1, 3–9
(Germany) Team GT3 Kasco	23	(Switzerland) Daniel Allemann	B	All
(Germany) Team GT3 Kasco	24	(Germany) Heiner Wackerbauer	B	1, 4, 6, 8–9
(Germany) Team GT3 Kasco	24	(Germany) Edward Lewis Brauner	B	7
(Germany) Highspeed Racing	25	(Germany) Thomas Langer	B	All
(Germany) Highspeed Racing	26	(Germany) Christof Langer	B	1, 3–5, 7–9
(Germany) Highspeed Racing	48	(Germany) Bertram Hornung	A	9
(Germany) MRS GT-Racing	32	(Ukraine) Andrii Lebed	B	1
(Germany) MRS GT-Racing	32	(Greece) Antonis Wossos	B	4, 8
(Germany) MRS GT-Racing	32	(Sweden) Lars Bertil Rantzow	B	9
(Germany) MRS GT-Racing	33	(Germany) Bill Barazetti	A	All
(Germany) MRS GT-Racing	34	(Austria) Philipp Eng	A	All
(Germany) MRS GT-Racing	35	(Canada) Kyle Marcelli	A	1, 3–5
(Germany) Logiplus MRS-Racing	35	(Germany) Kai Riemer	A	2
(Germany) Logiplus MRS-Racing	35	(Switzerland) Hans-Peter Koller	B	6, 8
(Germany) Logiplus MRS-Racing	35	(Sweden) Mats Karlsson	B	9
(Germany) Pistenclub e.V.	40	(Germany) Christopher Gerhard	A	2
(Germany) Team 75 Motorsport GmbH	41	(Denmark) Michael Christensen	A	6
(Germany) Team 75 Motorsport GmbH	45	(Finland) Antti Buri	A	8–9
(Germany) Team 75 Motorsport GmbH	49	(Sweden) Ola Nilsson	A	9
(Germany) Team 75 Motorsport GmbH	75	(Germany) Florian Spengler	A	All
(Turkey) Attempto Racing powered by Motorvision	44	(Spain) Alex Riberas	A	All
(Turkey) Attempto Racing powered by Motorvision	55	(Switzerland) Fabien Thuner	A	All
(Turkey) Attempto Racing powered by Häring	66	(Germany) Chris Bauer	B	All
(Turkey) Attempto Racing powered by Häring	77	(Germany) Dominic Jöst	B	All
(Turkey) Attempto Racing powered by Häring	88	(Denmark) Nicki Thiim	A	All
(Turkey) Attempto Racing powered by Häring	99	(France) Kévin Estre	A	All
(Germany) Motopark	76	(Germany) Timo Rumpfkeil	A	2

Icon	Class
A	A-class
B	B-class

== Race calendar and results ==
Round		Circuit	Date	Pole position	Fastest lap	Winning driver	Winning team	B-class winner
1	R1	(Germany) Hockenheimring	4 May	(France) Kévin Estre	(Austria) Norbert Siedler	(France) Kévin Estre	(Turkey) Attempto Racing powered by Häring	(Netherlands) Hoevert Vos
1	R2	(Germany) Hockenheimring	5 May	(France) Kévin Estre	(Germany) Christian Engelhart	(France) Kévin Estre	(Turkey) Attempto Racing powered by Häring	(Germany) Dominic Jöst
2	R3	(Germany) Nürburgring Nordschleife	19 May	(Netherlands) Jaap van Lagen	(United Kingdom) Sean Edwards	(Netherlands) Jaap van Lagen	(Germany) FE Racing by Land – Motorsport	(Netherlands) Wolf Nathan
3	R4	(Austria) Red Bull Ring	1 June	(Austria) Norbert Siedler	(Netherlands) Jaap van Lagen	(France) Kévin Estre	(Turkey) Attempto Racing powered by Häring	(Germany) Dominic Jöst
3	R5	(Austria) Red Bull Ring	2 June	(Austria) Norbert Siedler	(Austria) Philipp Eng	(France) Kévin Estre	(Turkey) Attempto Racing powered by Häring	(Switzerland) Rolf Ineichen
4	R6	(Germany) Lausitzring	15 June	(Denmark) Nicki Thiim	(Denmark) Nicki Thiim	(France) Kévin Estre	(Turkey) Attempto Racing powered by Häring	(Switzerland) Rolf Ineichen
4	R7	(Germany) Lausitzring	16 June	(Denmark) Nicki Thiim	(Denmark) Nicki Thiim	(Denmark) Nicki Thiim	(Turkey) Attempto Racing powered by Häring	(Germany) Dominic Jöst
5	R8	(Germany) Norisring	13 July	(France) Kévin Estre	(United Kingdom) Sean Edwards	(France) Kévin Estre	(Turkey) Attempto Racing powered by Häring	(Germany) Dominic Jöst
5	R9	(Germany) Norisring	14 July	(France) Kévin Estre	(Austria) Norbert Siedler	(Austria) Norbert Siedler	(Germany) Aust Motorsport	(Switzerland) Rolf Ineichen
6	R10	(Germany) Nürburgring Short	17 August	(Spain) Alex Riberas	(United Kingdom) Sean Edwards	(United Kingdom) Sean Edwards	(Germany) Team Deutsche Post with Project 1	(Switzerland) Rolf Ineichen
6	R11	(Germany) Nürburgring Short	18 August	(Germany) Christian Engelhart	(Spain) Alex Riberas	(Germany) Christian Engelhart	(Austria) Konrad Motorsport	(Germany) Chris Bauer
7	R12	(Germany) Oschersleben	14 September	(France) Kévin Estre	(France) Kévin Estre	(France) Kévin Estre	(Turkey) Attempto Racing powered by Häring	(Germany) Dominic Jöst
7	R13	(Germany) Oschersleben	15 September	(France) Kévin Estre	(Denmark) Nicki Thiim	(France) Kévin Estre	(Turkey) Attempto Racing powered by Häring	(Switzerland) Rolf Ineichen
8	R14	(Netherlands) Zandvoort	28 September^{1}	(Denmark) Nicki Thiim	(Denmark) Nicki Thiim	(Germany) Christian Engelhart	(Austria) Konrad Motorsport	(Germany) Dominic Jöst
8	R15	(Netherlands) Zandvoort	29 September	(Netherlands) Jaap van Lagen	(Austria) Norbert Siedler	(Netherlands) Jaap van Lagen	(Germany) FE Racing by Land – Motorsport	(Switzerland) Rolf Ineichen
9	R16	(Germany) Hockenheimring	19 October	(Denmark) Nicki Thiim	(Germany) Christian Engelhart	(Germany) Christian Engelhart	(Austria) Konrad Motorsport	(Switzerland) Rolf Ineichen
9	R17	(Germany) Hockenheimring	20 October	(France) Kévin Estre	(France) Kévin Estre	(France) Kévin Estre	(Turkey) Attempto Racing powered by Häring	(Switzerland) Rolf Ineichen

1# – Race staged on the Sunday due to a pileup in the first start on the Saturday.

== Championship standings ==
Points system
**1st**	**2nd**	**3rd**	**4th**	**5th**	**6th**	**7th**	**8th**	**9th**	**10th**	**11th**	**12th**	**13th**	**14th**	**15th**
20	18	16	14	12	10	9	8	7	6	5	4	3	2	1

=== A-class ===
Pos	Driver	HOC (Germany)		NNS (Germany)	RBR (Austria)		LAU (Germany)		NOR (Germany)		NÜR (Germany)		OSC (Germany)		ZAN (Netherlands)		HOC (Germany)		Pts
1	(France) Kévin Estre	**1**	**1**	4	1	1	1	Ret	**1**	**13**	9	3	**1**	**1**	Ret	9	2	**1**	249
2	(Germany) Christian Engelhart	3	3	7	5	2	2	10	6	Ret	3	**1**	5	4	1	4	1	2	239
3	(Denmark) Nicki Thiim	5	4	3	Ret	14	**DSQ**	**1**	5	2	2	4	2	2	**11**	2	**3**	4	217
4	(Austria) Norbert Siedler	6	5	5	**2**	**3**	Ret	4	2	1	Ret	9	6	6	Ret	16	9	7	167
5	(Austria) Philipp Eng	8	9	2	11	6	8	Ret	7	Ret	4	16	4	3	3	3	4	6	166
6	(United Kingdom) Sean Edwards	2	2	6	3	13	4	2	9	3	1	29†	8	27	18	6			162
7	(Netherlands) Jaap van Lagen	4	6	**1**	4	5	16	Ret	4	Ret	12	7	3	26	Ret	**1**	5	5	159
8	(Poland) Robert Lukas	7	7	Ret	Ret	26	3	6	3	5	11	6	12	5	2	Ret	6	33†	134
9	(United States) Connor de Phillippi	10	11	9	13	7	7	8	8	7	7	12	11	12	4	8	11	Ret	116
10	(Switzerland) Jeffrey Schmidt	11	12	13	10	28†	11	3	13	9	6	8	10	8	Ret	11	7	8	105
11	(Spain) Alex Riberas	12	10	12	9	27†	5	5	17	DNS	**Ret**	5	14	9	Ret	DNS	18	3	85
12	(Netherlands) Pieter Schothorst	Ret	14	8	14	12	20	Ret	11	DNS	5	10	9	Ret	6	10	8	9	79
13	(Netherlands) Bas Schothorst	26	17	Ret	18	16	12	7	20	12	13	14	7	11	7	7	29	10	63
14	(Switzerland) Fabien Thuner	13	15	17	16	9	9	Ret	12	11	14	15	13	14	8	13	12	18	55
15	(Germany) Marko Klein	24	16	26†	6	8	14	20	Ret	4	Ret	Ret	15	13	Ret	12	Ret	13	48
16	(Germany) Felipe Fernández Laser	9	8	18	12	4	6	13											47
17	(Austria) Christopher Zöchling			10					10	25†	19	13	27	7	5	23	30†	14	43
18	(United States) Sean Johnston	Ret	13	Ret	17	15	17	Ret	21	6	10	11	Ret	10	9	25			41
19	(Germany) Elia Erhart	Ret	DNS	20	7	10	10	15	15	10	Ret	DNS	18	15	13	Ret			36
20	(Germany) Luca Stolz	14	Ret		8	Ret	21	18	14	DNS	16	17	Ret	17	10	Ret	13	30†	25
21	(Canada) Kyle Marcelli	21	Ret		15	11	29†	9	25	8									21
22	(Austria) Sascha Halek	18	Ret	19	30†	Ret	24	11	19	Ret	Ret	19	16	28†	15	Ret	Ret	15	12
23	(Germany) Florian Spengler	25	21	15	20	17	13	21	Ret	24	Ret	18	DNS	DNS	Ret	DNS	Ret	17	8
24	(Germany) Florian Scholze	Ret	28†	16	27	Ret	15	16	30	Ret	17	Ret	Ret	DNS	Ret	27†	14	31†	8
25	(Germany) Kai Reimer			11															5
26	(Germany) Bill Barazetti	28	Ret	21	23	18	Ret	DNS	26	17	20	20	26	23	22	DNS	25	21	3
27	(Germany) Christopher Gerhard			14															2
28	(United States) Patrick Lindsey																17	32†	2
	(Austria) Andreas Mayerl			DSQ															0
guest drivers ineligible for championship points
	(Denmark) Michael Christensen										8	2							0
	(Netherlands) Jeroen Mul														12	5	10	11	0
	(Finland) Antti Buri														14	Ret	DNS	16	0
	(Sweden) Ola Nilsson																15	DNS	0
	(Germany) Bertram Hornung																24	25	0
	(Netherlands) Daan Meijer														25	24			0
	(Germany) Timo Rumpfkeil			Ret															0
Pos	Driver	HOC (Germany)		NNS (Germany)	RBR (Austria)		LAU (Germany)		NOR (Germany)		NÜR (Germany)		OSC (Germany)		ZAN (Netherlands)		HOC (Germany)		Pts

Colour	Result
Gold	Winner
Silver	Second place
Bronze	Third place
Green	Points classification
Blue	Non-points classification
Blue	Non-classified finish (NC)
Purple	Retired, not classified (Ret)
Red	Did not qualify (DNQ)
Red	Did not pre-qualify (DNPQ)
Black	Disqualified (DSQ)
White	Did not start (DNS)
White	Withdrew (WD)
White	Race cancelled (C)
Blank	Did not practice (DNP)
Blank	Did not arrive (DNA)
Blank	Excluded (EX)

**Bold** – Pole
Italics – Fastest Lap

† — Drivers did not finish the race, but were classified as they completed over 90% of the race distance.

=== B-class ===
Pos	Driver	HOC (Germany)		NNS (Germany)	RBR (Austria)		LAU (Germany)		NOR (Germany)		NÜR (Germany)		OSC (Germany)		ZAN (Netherlands)		HOC (Germany)		Pts
1	(Switzerland) Rolf Ineichen	16	**19**		21	19	18	14	**Ret**	14	**15**	**23**	**19**	**16**	17	14	**16**	12	284
2	(Germany) Dominic Jöst	**27**	18	**Ret**	**19**	21	19	12	16	**15**	Ret	27	17	18	**16**	**15**	DNS	**DNS**	225
3	(Netherlands) Wolf Nathan	Ret	25	22	23	22	22	Ret	23	22	27†	22	21	19	Ret	19	22	19	195
4	(Switzerland) Daniel Allemann	17	20	23	24	**Ret**	Ret	DNS	18	16	26	Ret	22	21	20	17	19	24	188
5	(Germany) Thomas Langer	22	23	25	28	23	26	19	28	23	24	26	23	22	28	22	28	29	166
6	(Germany) Chris Bauer	Ret	26	24	26	24	**Ret**	**Ret**	22	19	18	21	Ret	DNS	19	20	DNS	26	145
7	(Germany) Georg Engelhardt	DSQ	DSQ		25	20	28†	DNS	Ret	18	21	25	20	20	21	Ret	21	27	144
8	(Germany) Heiner Wackerbauer	21	22				23	Ret	23	24					26	21	25	23	105
9	(Germany) Christof Langer	23	24		29	25	25	DNS	29	26			24	25	29	DNS	27	28	101
10	(Netherlands) Ronald van de Laar								24	20	22	28			24	18			67
11	(Switzerland) Hans-Peter Koller										25	30†			23	26			33
12	(Sweden) Mats Karlsson																20	20	32
13	(Greece) Antonis Wossos						27†	17							27	DNS			32
14	(Sweden) Lars Bertil Rantzow																26	22	23
15	(Ukraine) Andrii Lebed	19	27																21
16	(Netherlands) Hoevert Vos	15	Ret																20
17	(Germany) Edward Lewis Brauner												25	24					17
guest drivers ineligible for championship points
	(Germany) Hermann Speck								27	21									0
Pos	Driver	HOC (Germany)		NNS (Germany)	RBR (Austria)		LAU (Germany)		NOR (Germany)		NÜR (Germany)		OSC (Germany)		ZAN (Netherlands)		HOC (Germany)		Pts
