= 2012 Porsche Supercup =

20th Porsche Supercup season

The 2012 Porsche Mobil 1 Supercup season was the 20th Porsche Supercup season. It began on 21 April on Bahrain International Circuit and finished on 9 September at Monza Circuit, after ten scheduled races.

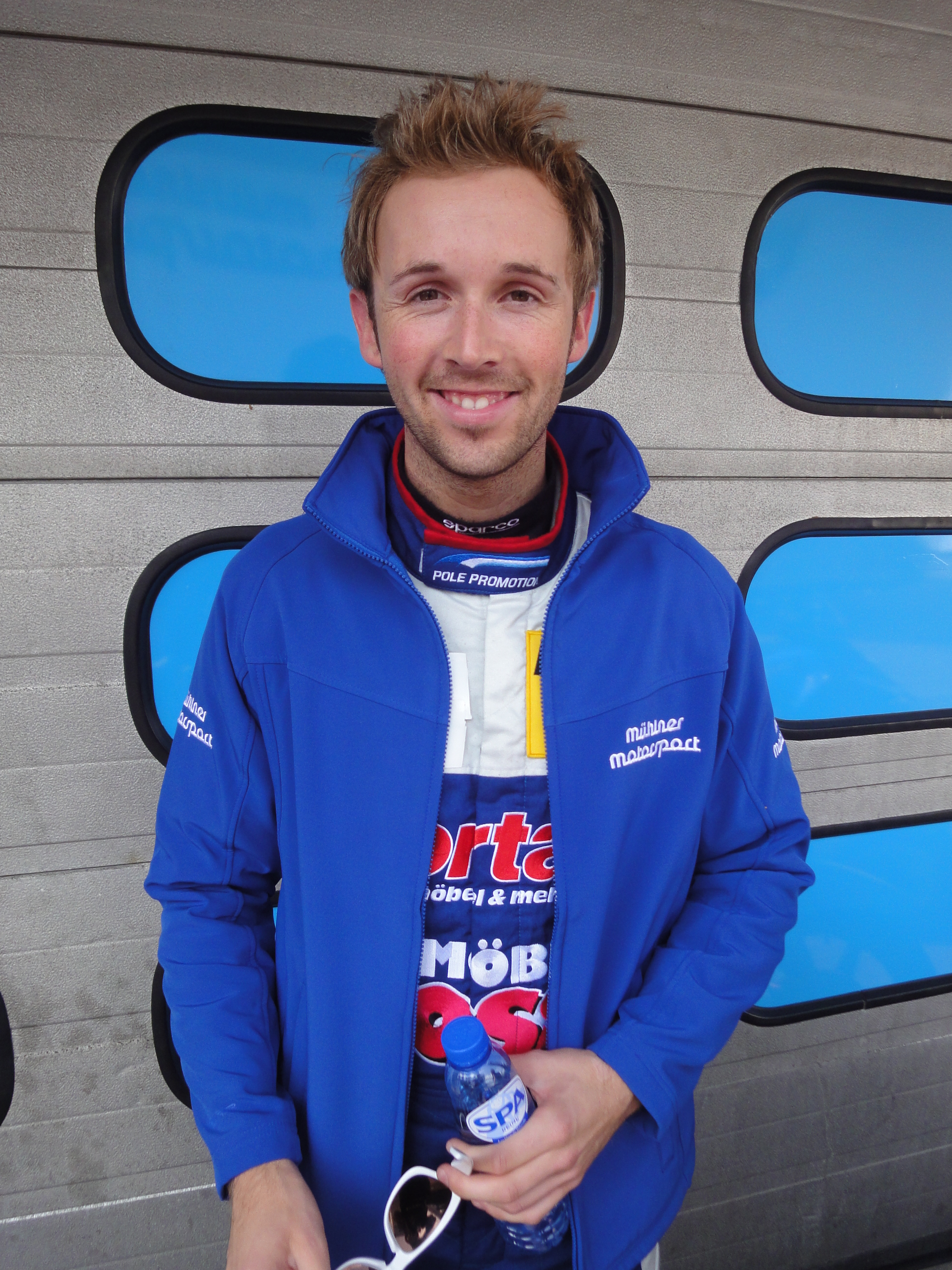
René Rast (pictured in 2010) successfully defended his Drivers' Championship title and became a three-time champion

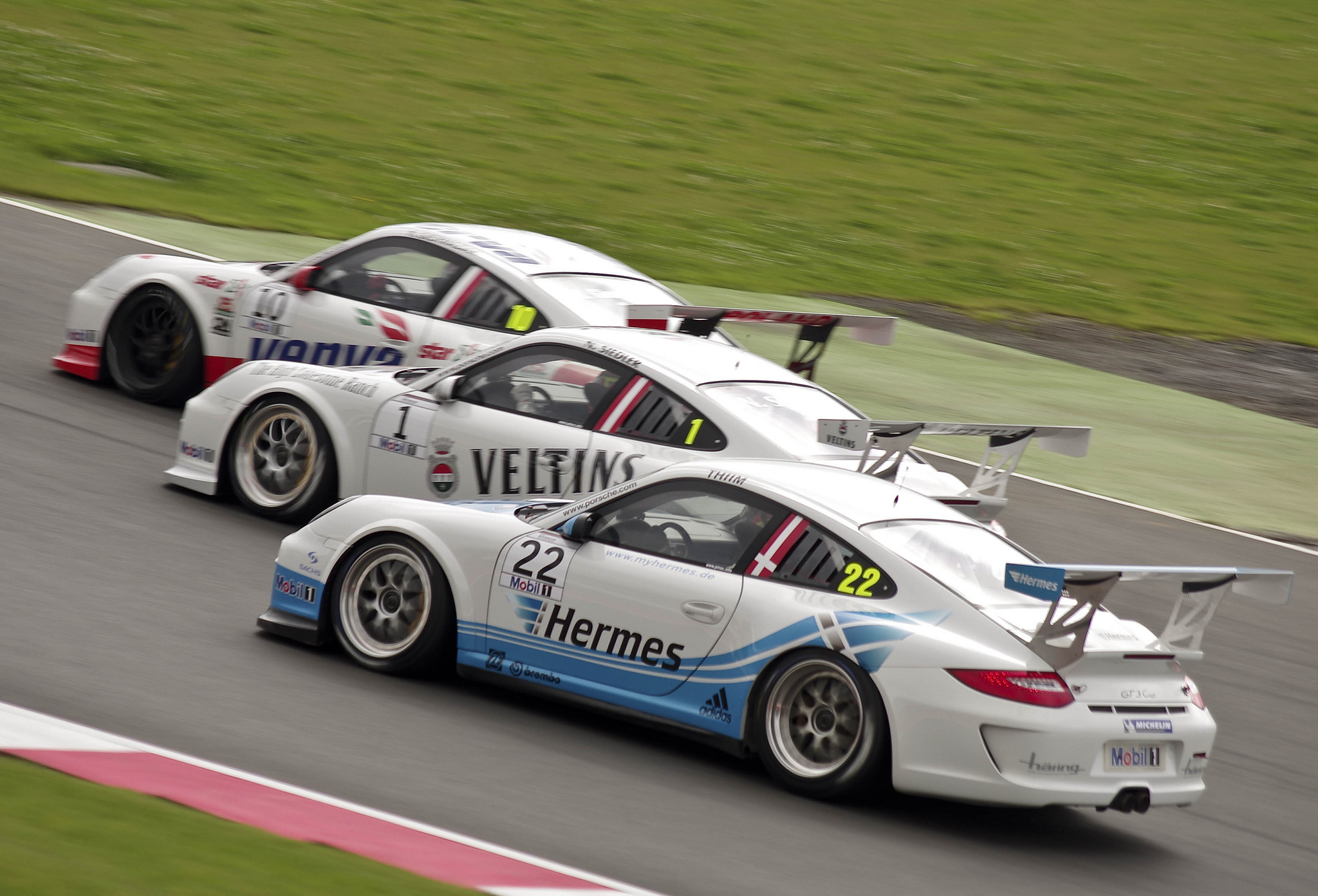
Battle for position between Kuba Giermaziak, Norbert Siedler and Nicki Thiim during the 2012 Porsche Supercup race at Silverstone.

== Teams and drivers ==
Team	No.	Drivers	Rounds
(Austria) Veltins Lechner Racing	1	(Austria) Norbert Siedler	All
(Austria) Veltins Lechner Racing	2	(Germany) Michael Ammermüller	All
(Poland) Förch Racing by Lukas MS	3	(Spain) Isaac Tutumlu	2–9
(Poland) Förch Racing by Lukas MS	6	(Germany) Florian Scholze	All
(Poland) Förch Racing	4	(Poland) Robert Lukas	All
(Poland) Förch Racing	5	(Slovakia) Štefan Rosina	1–2
(Poland) Förch Racing	5	(Poland) Stefan Biliński	3
(Poland) Förch Racing	5	(Poland) Mateusz Lisowski	4–9
(Germany) MRS GT-Racing	7	(United States) Will Langhorne	2–3
(Germany) MRS GT-Racing	7	(Austria) Philipp Eng	4, 6–7, 9
(Germany) MRS GT-Racing	8	(Austria) Philipp Eng	2
(Germany) MRS GT-Racing	8	(Monaco) Richard Hein	3–4
(Germany) MRS GT-Racing	8	(Germany) Bill Barazetti	6
(Germany) MRS GT-Racing	8	(Sweden) Mats Karlsson	7
(Germany) MRS GT-Racing	8	(Norway) Roar Lindland	9
(Poland) VERVA Racing Team	9	(Poland) Patryk Szczerbiński	All
(Poland) VERVA Racing Team	10	(Poland) Kuba Giermaziak	All
(Germany) Konrad Motorsport	11	(Germany) Christian Engelhart	All
(Germany) Konrad Motorsport	12	(United Kingdom) Sean Edwards	All
(Germany) Konrad Motorsport	14	(Netherlands) Renger van der Zande	1–2
(Germany) Konrad Motorsport	14	(Denmark) Michael Christensen	3, 6
(Germany) Konrad Motorsport	14	(Czech Republic) Tomáš Pivoda	8–9
(Austria) Lechner Racing	15	(Qatar) Saadon Al Kuwari	1
(Austria) Lechner Racing	15	(Austria) Andreas Mayerl	2–9
(Austria) Lechner Racing	16	(Germany) René Rast	All
(Austria) Lechner Racing	46	(Netherlands) Jeroen Bleekemolen	3
(Netherlands) Team Bleekemolen	17	(Netherlands) Sebastiaan Bleekemolen	1, 3–9
(Netherlands) Team Bleekemolen	18	(Netherlands) Jeroen Mul	All
(Netherlands) Team Bleekemolen	19	(Italy) Alessandro Zampedri	2–7, 9
(Netherlands) Team Bleekemolen	19	(United States) Michael Hedlund	8
(Germany) Porsche AG	20	(Germany) Nick Heidfeld	6
(Germany) Hermes Attempto Racing	21	(France) Henry Hassid	3, 8
(Germany) Hermes Attempto Racing	22	(Denmark) Nicki Thiim	All
(Germany) Hermes Attempto Racing	33	(France) Kévin Estre	All
(Italy) Antonelli Motorsport	40	(Italy) Angelo Proietti	2–3, 9
(Italy) Antonelli Motorsport	40	(Switzerland) Philipp Frommenwiler	6
(Italy) Antonelli Motorsport	41	(Italy) Marco Antonelli	2
(Italy) Antonelli Motorsport	41	(Italy) Andrea Belicchi	3
(Italy) Antonelli Motorsport	41	(Italy) Gianluca Giraudi	6
(Italy) Antonelli Motorsport	41	(Switzerland) Stefano Comini	9
(United Kingdom) Porsche Carrera Cup GB	42	(United Kingdom) Michael Meadows	3, 5
(United Kingdom) Porsche Carrera Cup GB	43	(United Kingdom) Glynn Geddie	3
(United Kingdom) Porsche Carrera Cup GB	48	(United Kingdom) Daniel Lloyd	5
(United Kingdom) Porsche Carrera Cup GB	49	(United Kingdom) Rory Butcher	5
(United Kingdom) Redline Racing	43	(United Kingdom) Glynn Geddie	5
(United Kingdom) Redline Racing	47	(Oman) Ahmad Al Harthy	5
(Austria) SWITCH IT Lechner Racing	44	(Netherlands) Oskar Slingerland	3
(Austria) SWITCH IT Lechner Racing	45	(Austria) Clemens Schmid	3
(United Kingdom) Nass Court Team Parker	50	(Republic of Ireland) Michael Leonard	5
(United Kingdom) Nass Court Team Parker	51	(United Kingdom) Sam Tordoff	5
(United Kingdom) Nass Court Team Parker	52	(United Kingdom) Richard Plant	5
(Germany) Team Deutsche Post by Tolimit	53	(Austria) Klaus Bachler	6, 8
(Germany) Team Deutsche Post by Tolimit	54	(United Arab Emirates) Khaled Al Qubaisi	6, 8
(Sweden) Flash Engineering	55	(Sweden) Mats Karlsson	6
(Sweden) Flash Engineering	56	(Sweden) Patrik Skoog	6
(Germany) FE Racing by Land Motorsport	57	(Netherlands) Jaap van Lagen	8
(Germany) FE Racing by Land Motorsport	58	(Netherlands) Wolf Nathan	8
(Germany) FE Racing by Land Motorsport	59	(Netherlands) Biense Dijkstra	8
(Germany) Haribo Racing Team	88	(Germany) Hans-Guido Riegel	8

== Race calendar and results ==
On 20 October 2011 the series schedule was announced, consisting of ten races at nine circuits. Sakhir will return and replaces the round at the Yas Marina Circuit. Following 4 May incident at Fuji International Speedway during the 500km Super GT event that severely injured Porsche driver Tim Bergmeister, an investigation of the crash and numerous wheel failures found during the Barcelona round led to officials moving the round to the Hungaroring, making that round a two-race weekend, with the replacement race on Saturday and the regular round on Sunday.

Round		Circuit	Date	Pole position	Fastest lap	Winning driver	Winning team
1	R1	Bahrain International Circuit	21 April	(Austria) Norbert Siedler	(Germany) René Rast	(Germany) René Rast	(Austria) Lechner Racing
1	R2	Bahrain International Circuit	22 April	(Austria) Norbert Siedler	(Austria) Norbert Siedler	(Austria) Norbert Siedler	(Austria) Veltins Lechner Racing
2		(Spain) Circuit de Catalunya	13 May	(Germany) Christian Engelhart	Race moved to Hungary after wheel failures were detected on many cars during the race weekend; Porsche made decision after these incidents and Super GT crash in Japan.		
3		Circuit de Monaco	27 May	(United Kingdom) Sean Edwards	(Germany) René Rast	(United Kingdom) Sean Edwards	(Germany) Konrad Motorsport
4		(Spain) Valencia Street Circuit	24 June	(Germany) René Rast	(Germany) René Rast	(Germany) René Rast	(Austria) Lechner Racing
5		(United Kingdom) Silverstone Circuit	8 July	(Poland) Kuba Giermaziak	(Austria) Norbert Siedler	(Germany) René Rast	(Austria) Lechner Racing
6		(Germany) Hockenheimring	22 July	(Germany) René Rast	(Germany) René Rast	(Germany) René Rast	(Austria) Lechner Racing
7	R1	(Hungary) Hungaroring	28 July	(Germany) René Rast	(Germany) Michael Ammermüller	(France) Kévin Estre	(Germany) Hermes Attempto Racing
7	R2	(Hungary) Hungaroring	29 July	(Germany) René Rast	(Germany) Christian Engelhart	(Germany) Christian Engelhart	(Germany) Konrad Motorsport
8		(Belgium) Circuit de Spa-Francorchamps	2 September	(Denmark) Nicki Thiim	(Netherlands) Jaap van Lagen	(Denmark) Nicki Thiim	(Germany) Hermes Attempto Racing
9		(Italy) Monza Circuit	9 September	(Austria) Norbert Siedler	(Austria) Norbert Siedler	(Germany) René Rast	(Austria) Lechner Racing

== Championship standings ==
=== Drivers' Championship ===
Pos	Driver	BHR (Bahrain)		MON (Monaco)	VAL (Spain)	SIL (United Kingdom)	HOC (Germany)	HUN (Hungary)		SPA (Belgium)	MNZ (Italy)	Points
1	(Germany) René Rast	1	3	Ret	**1**	1	**1**	**DNS**	**DNS**	2	1	142
2	(France) Kévin Estre	9	4	2	8	6	3	1	5	4	2	139
3	(Denmark) Nicki Thiim	7	6	Ret	4	8	5	4	2	**1**	3	123
4	(Austria) Norbert Siedler	**3**	**1**	4	11	2	Ret	5	6	6	**8**	121
5	(United Kingdom) Sean Edwards	2	14	**1**	2	3	Ret	3	DSQ	5	DSQ	107
6	(Germany) Michael Ammermüller	4	15	6	Ret	7	2	2	4	8	9	103
7	(Poland) Kuba Giermaziak	8	5	7	10	**4**	Ret	9	3	7	4	99
8	(Germany) Christian Engelhart	5	2	3	15	Ret	Ret	7	1	Ret	7	87
9	(Poland) Robert Lukas	13	13	9	3	11	4	8	7	12	Ret	74
10	(Poland) Patryk Szczerbiński	10	9	14	13	5	6	12	13	9	10	66
11	(Netherlands) Sebastiaan Bleekemolen	6	8	Ret	6	9	Ret	11	9	11	17	54
12	(Netherlands) Jeroen Mul	12	Ret	11	17	10	19	Ret	8	Ret	5	42
13	(Austria) Philipp Eng				5		7	6	Ret		6	41
14	(Austria) Andreas Mayerl			15	7	Ret	14	14	10	18	14	31
15	(Italy) Alessandro Zampedri			10	14	14	11	Ret	Ret		12	26
16	(Germany) Florian Scholze	15	12	19	12	Ret	Ret	13	11	14	18	24
17	(Spain) Isaac Tutumlu			21	9	18	13	Ret	Ret	17	15	21
18	(Poland) Mateusz Lisowski				18	15	20	10	Ret	15	Ret	18
19	(Netherlands) Renger van der Zande	11	7									14
20	(Slovakia) Štefan Rosina	Ret	10									6
21	(United States) Will Langhorne			13								6
22	(Monaco) Richard Hein			18	16							3
Guest drivers ineligible for points
	(Netherlands) Jaap van Lagen									3		0
	(Netherlands) Jeroen Bleekemolen			5								0
	(Denmark) Michael Christensen			20			8					0
	(Italy) Andrea Belicchi			8								0
	(Switzerland) Philipp Frommenwiler						9					0
	(Austria) Klaus Bachler						12			10		0
	(Germany) Nick Heidfeld						10					0
	(Qatar) Saadon Al Kuwari	14	11									0
	(Switzerland) Stefano Comini										11	0
	(Sweden) Mats Karlsson						18	15	12			0
	(Italy) Angelo Proietti			12							16	0
	(United Kingdom) Sam Tordoff					12						0
	(Czech Republic) Tomáš Pivoda									16	13	0
	(United Kingdom) Michael Meadows			23†		13						0
	(France) Henry Hassid			Ret						15		0
	(Italy) Gianluca Giraudi						15					0
	(Austria) Clemens Schmid			16								0
	(United Kingdom) Rory Butcher					16						0
	(United Arab Emirates) Khaled Al Qubaisi						16			19		0
	(Poland) Stefan Biliński			17								0
	(United Kingdom) Richard Plant					17						0
	(Sweden) Patrik Skoog						17					0
	(Republic of Ireland) Michael Leonard					19						0
	(Norway) Roar Lindland										19	0
	(Netherlands) Wolf Nathan									20		0
	(Germany) Hans-Guido Riegel									21		0
	(United Kingdom) Glynn Geddie			22		Ret						0
	(United States) Michael Hedlund									22		0
	(Netherlands) Biense Dijkstra									23		0
	(Oman) Ahmad Al Harthy					Ret						0
	(United Kingdom) Daniel Lloyd					Ret						0
	(Germany) Bill Barazetti						Ret					0
	(Netherlands) Oskar Slingerland			DNS								0
	(Italy) Marco Antonelli											0
Pos	Driver	BHR (Bahrain)		MON (Monaco)	VAL (Spain)	SIL (United Kingdom)	HOC (Germany)	HUN (Hungary)		SPA (Belgium)	MNZ (Italy)	Points

Colour	Result
Gold	Winner
Silver	Second place
Bronze	Third place
Green	Points classification
Blue	Non-points classification
Blue	Non-classified finish (NC)
Purple	Retired, not classified (Ret)
Red	Did not qualify (DNQ)
Red	Did not pre-qualify (DNPQ)
Black	Disqualified (DSQ)
White	Did not start (DNS)
White	Withdrew (WD)
White	Race cancelled (C)
Blank	Did not practice (DNP)
Blank	Did not arrive (DNA)
Blank	Excluded (EX)

**Bold** – Pole
Italics – Fastest Lap

† – Drivers did not finish the race, but were classified as they completed over 90% of the race distance.

Position	1st	2nd	3rd	4th	5th	6th	7th	8th	9th	10th	11th	12th	13th	14th	15th	Pole	Ref
Points	20	18	16	14	12	10	9	8	7	6	5	4	3	2	1	2	
