= 2013 Porsche Supercup =

21st Porsche Supercup season

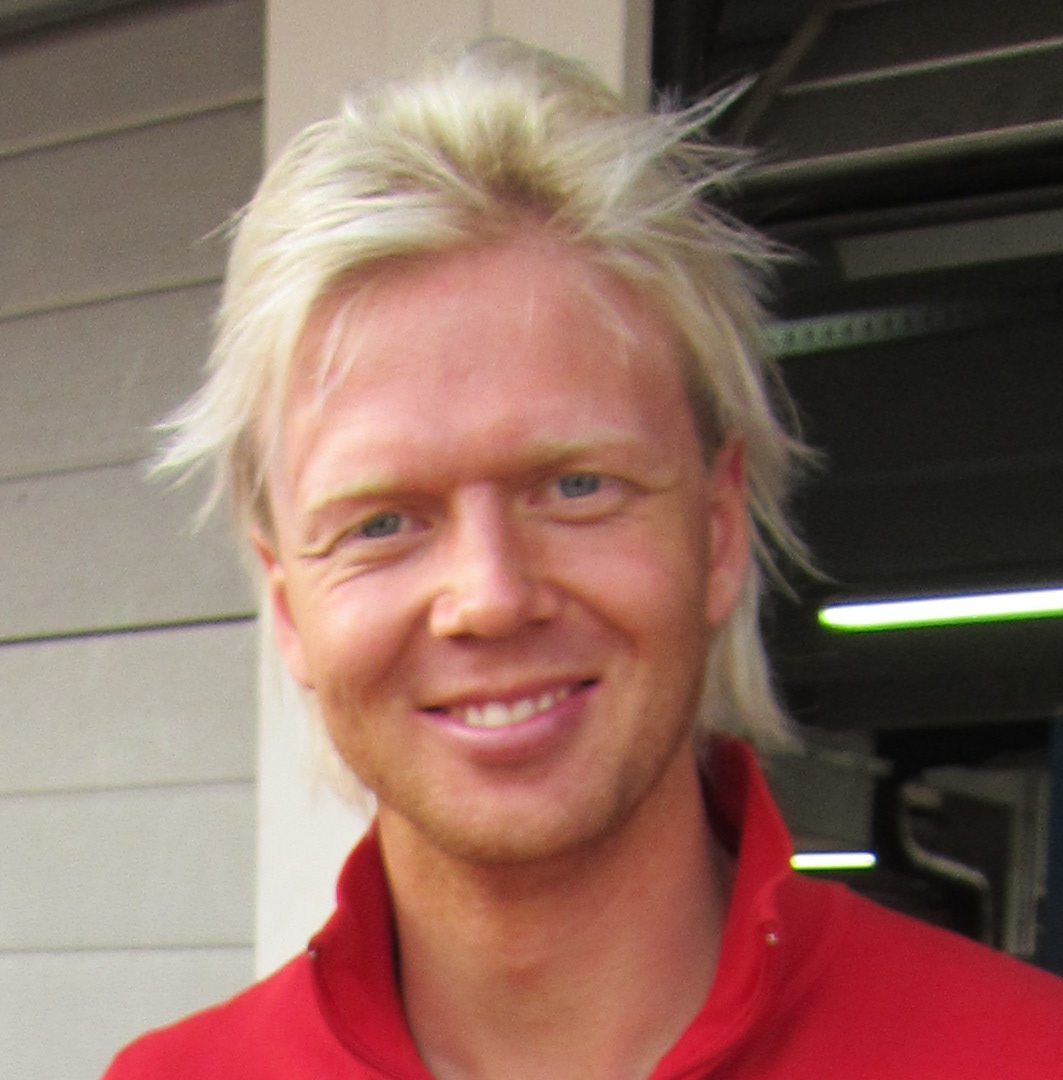
Nicki Thiim (pictured in 2015) won the Drivers' Championship title

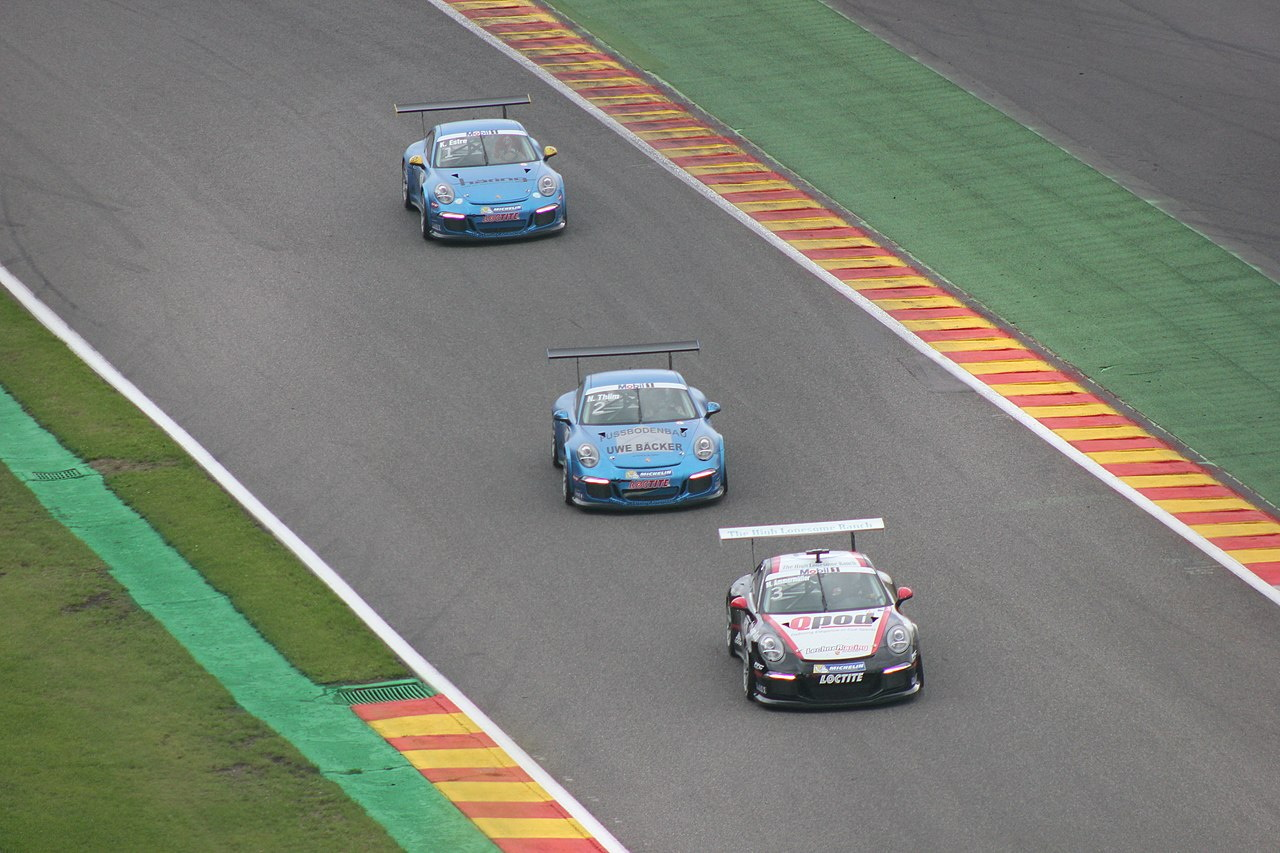
Racing scene from Belgium

The 2013 Porsche Mobil 1 Supercup season was the 21st Porsche Supercup season. It began on 12 May on Circuit de Catalunya and finished on 3 November at Yas Marina Circuit, after nine races, all of which were support events for the 2013 Formula One season. A new car was introduced for the season as the Porsche 991 – the internal designation for the seventh-generation Porsche 911 – replaced the Porsche 997.

Three-time champion René Rast did not return to defend his title, opting to focus on the ADAC GT Masters, the FIA GT Series and the Blancpain Endurance Series, where he would compete for Belgian Audi Club WRT. BTCC champion and former WTCC driver Alain Menu joined the series with his own team, FACH Auto Tech.

Ahead of the final round of the series in Abu Dhabi, Monégasque-based British driver Sean Edwards held a championship lead of eighteen points over Denmark's Nicki Thiim, with Michael Ammermüller of Germany the only other driver to remain within contention for winning the title. Edwards was killed on 15 October 2013 at Queensland Raceway in Willowbank, Australia, while instructing a member of the public at a private test session. Thiim ultimately won the championship, after he won both races in Abu Dhabi; Edwards ended up second overall, finishing three points ahead of Ammermüller.

== Changes for 2013 ==
=== Technical ===
- After twenty consecutive seasons, the manual gearbox stick shifters were replaced by newly-mandatory sequential semi-automatic paddle-shifters respectively for all Porsche Mobil 1 Supercup cars to allow drivers shifting gears with only their fingers. The paddle shift reduces shift errors and improves safety since the driver can shift gears without taking a hand off the steering wheel even when cornering, which requires gear shifting.

== Teams and drivers ==
Team	No.	Drivers	Rounds
(Germany) Attempto Racing	1	(France) Kévin Estre	All
(Germany) Attempto Racing	2	(Denmark) Nicki Thiim	All
(Austria) Lechner Racing	3	(Germany) Michael Ammermüller	All
(Austria) Lechner Racing	4	(Slovakia) Štefan Rosina	1
(Austria) Lechner Racing	4	(Netherlands) Jeroen Bleekemolen	2–3, 5–8
(Austria) Lechner Racing	4	(Netherlands) Jaap van Lagen	4
(Poland) FÖRCH Racing by Lukas MS	5	(Poland) Robert Lukas	All
(Poland) FÖRCH Racing by Lukas MS	6	(Austria) Klaus Bachler	All
(Germany) MRS GT-Racing	7	(Argentina) Esteban Gini	1–4
(Germany) MRS GT-Racing	7	(Austria) Philipp Eng	7
(Germany) MRS GT-Racing	7	(Japan) Kenji Kobayashi	8
(Germany) MRS GT-Racing	8	(Norway) Roar Lindland	1–2, 4–8
(Germany) MRS GT-Racing	8	(Republic of Ireland) Karl Leonard	3
(Germany) MRS GT-Racing	9	(France) Jean-Karl Vernay	All
(Netherlands) Team Bleekemolen	10	(United Kingdom) Ben Barker	All
(Netherlands) Team Bleekemolen	17	(Netherlands) Sebastiaan Bleekemolen	All
(Netherlands) Team Bleekemolen	18	(Netherlands) Jeroen Mul	All
(Poland) VERVA Racing Team	11	(Poland) Patryk Szczerbiński	All
(Poland) VERVA Racing Team	12	(Poland) Kuba Giermaziak	All
(Germany) Team Allyouneed by Project 1	14	(United Kingdom) (Monaco) Sean Edwards (Note: Edwards ran under a British licence for the first two meetings of the season before changing to a Monegasque one for Silverstone.)	1–7
(Germany) Team Allyouneed by Project 1	15	(United States) Sean Johnston	All
(Germany) Team Allyouneed by Project 1	16	(France) Sébastien Ogier	2
(Germany) Team Allyouneed by Project 1	16	(Switzerland) Jeffrey Schmidt	3–4
(Germany) Team Allyouneed by Project 1	16	(Austria) Andreas Mayerl	6
(Germany) Team Allyouneed by Project 1	16	(Brazil) Nonô Figueiredo	7
(Bahrain) Lechner Racing Academy	19	(Austria) Clemens Schmid	All
(Bahrain) Lechner Racing Academy	20	(Germany) Markus Pommer	All
(France) DAMS	21	(Denmark) Michael Christensen	All
(France) DAMS	22	(New Zealand) Richie Stanaway	All
(United States) MOMO-Megatron	23	(Italy) Alessandro Zampedri	1–3, 5, 7
(United States) MOMO-Megatron	23	(Belgium) Dylan Derdaele	4, 6, 8
(United States) MOMO-Megatron	24	(Netherlands) Jochen Habets	All
(Switzerland) FACH Auto Tech	25	(Switzerland) Carlo Lusser	1
(Switzerland) FACH Auto Tech	25	(Germany) Christian Engelhart	2–8
(Switzerland) FACH Auto Tech	26	(Switzerland) Alain Menu	1–2
(Switzerland) FACH Auto Tech	26	(Austria) Martin Ragginger	3, 6–7
(Switzerland) FACH Auto Tech	26	(Germany) Florian Spengler	4
(Switzerland) FACH Auto Tech	26	(New Zealand) Earl Bamber	5, 8
(Bahrain) GT3 Cup Challenge Middle East	30	(Kuwait) Zaid Ashkanani	8
(Bahrain) GT3 Cup Challenge Middle East	31	(Switzerland) Antonio Giancola	8
(Bahrain) GT3 Cup Challenge Middle East	32	(Germany) Hannes Waimer	8
(Germany) Porsche AG	88	(France) Sébastien Loeb	1–2
(Germany) Porsche AG	88	(Italy) Emanuele Pirro	7

== Race calendar and results ==
Round		Circuit	Date	Pole position	Fastest lap	Winning driver	Winning team
1		(Spain) Circuit de Catalunya	12 May	(United Kingdom) Sean Edwards	(United Kingdom) Sean Edwards	(United Kingdom) Sean Edwards	(Germany) Team Allyouneed by Project 1
2		Circuit de Monaco	26 May	(United Kingdom) Sean Edwards	(United Kingdom) Sean Edwards	(United Kingdom) Sean Edwards	(Germany) Team Allyouneed by Project 1
3		(United Kingdom) Silverstone Circuit	30 June	(Denmark) Nicki Thiim	(Denmark) Michael Christensen	(Denmark) Nicki Thiim	(Germany) Attempto Racing
4		(Germany) Nürburgring	7 July	(Denmark) Michael Christensen	(Germany) Michael Ammermüller	(Denmark) Michael Christensen	(France) DAMS
5		(Hungary) Hungaroring	28 July	(Monaco) Sean Edwards	(Monaco) Sean Edwards	(Monaco) Sean Edwards	(Germany) Team Allyouneed by Project 1
6		(Belgium) Circuit de Spa-Francorchamps	25 August	(Poland) Kuba Giermaziak	(Poland) Kuba Giermaziak	(Austria) Klaus Bachler	(Poland) FÖRCH Racing by Lukas MS
7		(Italy) Autodromo Nazionale Monza	8 September	(Denmark) Nicki Thiim	(France) Kévin Estre	(Denmark) Nicki Thiim	(Germany) Attempto Racing
8	R1	(United Arab Emirates) Yas Marina Circuit	2 November	(New Zealand) Earl Bamber	(New Zealand) Earl Bamber	(Denmark) Nicki Thiim	(Germany) Attempto Racing
8	R2	(United Arab Emirates) Yas Marina Circuit	3 November	(Denmark) Nicki Thiim	(Denmark) Nicki Thiim	(Denmark) Nicki Thiim	(Germany) Attempto Racing

== Championship standings ==
Position	1st	2nd	3rd	4th	5th	6th	7th	8th	9th	10th	11th	12th	13th	14th	15th	Ref
Points	20	18	16	14	12	10	9	8	7	6	5	4	3	2	1	

=== Drivers' Championship ===
Pos	Driver	CAT (Spain)	MON (Monaco)	SIL (United Kingdom)	NÜR (Germany)	HUN (Hungary)	SPA (Belgium)	MNZ (Italy)	YMC (United Arab Emirates)		Points
1	(Denmark) Nicki Thiim	2	8	**1**	2	8	8	**1**	1	**1**	140
2	(United Kingdom) Sean Edwards	**1**	**1**	4	4	**1**	2	5			118
3	(Germany) Michael Ammermüller	3	3	2	5	14	5	2	6	8	115
4	(France) Kévin Estre	DNS	6	6	3	4	7	3	5	2	107
5	(Poland) Kuba Giermaziak	4	2	5	Ret	3	**11**	6	3	6	105
6	(Denmark) Michael Christensen	5	25	3	**1**	10	3	8	10	7	95
7	(Austria) Klaus Bachler	7	10	21	9	5	1	7	7	21†	73
8	(Germany) Christian Engelhart		5	8	Ret	2	12	4	9	12	69
9	(Netherlands) Jeroen Bleekemolen		4	11		9	6	10	8	3	67
10	(United Kingdom) Ben Barker	10	9	9	6	16	9	12	4	9	66
11	(Poland) Robert Lukas	6	15	Ret	7	19	4	Ret	14	11	44
12	(New Zealand) Richie Stanaway	9	7	13	10	Ret	13	Ret	17	4	43
13	(France) Jean-Karl Vernay	12	11	20	11	11	14	9	Ret	DSQ	29
14	(Netherlands) Jeroen Mul	8	19	15	Ret	13	10	13	11	Ret	27
15	(Germany) Markus Pommer	19	17	14	16	7	20	22	12	13	25
16	(Poland) Patryk Szczerbiński	15	14	10	Ret	6	Ret	19	18	15	24
17	(Austria) Clemens Schmid	14	12	12	Ret	12	15	15	16	Ret	21
18	(Netherlands) Sebastiaan Bleekemolen	18	18	18	8	21	18	18	Ret	10	15
19	(Austria) Martin Ragginger			7			17	11			14
20	(United States) Sean Johnston	17	20	17	19	18	16	Ret	13	14	9
21	(Netherlands) Jochen Habets	20†	Ret	22	17	Ret	21	17	20	16	4
22	(Italy) Alessandro Zampedri	16	23	16		17		16			3
23	(Norway) Roar Lindland	Ret	22		18	20	23	20	21	Ret	2
24	(Argentina) Esteban Gini	Ret	24	23	20						0
25	(Switzerland) Alain Menu	Ret	21								0
Guest drivers ineligible for points
	(New Zealand) Earl Bamber					15			**2**	5	0
	(France) Sébastien Loeb	11	16								0
	(Netherlands) Jaap van Lagen				12						0
	(Switzerland) Jeffrey Schmidt			24	13						0
	(Slovakia) Štefan Rosina	13									0
	(France) Sébastien Ogier		13								0
	(Germany) Florian Spengler				14						0
	(Austria) Philipp Eng							14			0
	(Kuwait) Zaid Ashkanani								15	17	0
	(Belgium) Dylan Derdaele				15		19		19	Ret	0
	(Germany) Hannes Waimer								NC	18	0
	(Switzerland) Antonio Giancola								22	19	0
	(Republic of Ireland) Karl Leonard			19							0
	(Japan) Kenji Kobayashi								23	20	0
	(Brazil) Nonô Figueiredo							21			0
	(Austria) Andreas Mayerl						22				0
	(Italy) Emanuele Pirro							23†			0
	(Switzerland) Carlo Lusser	Ret									0
Pos	Driver	CAT (Spain)	MON (Monaco)	SIL (United Kingdom)	NÜR (Germany)	HUN (Hungary)	SPA (Belgium)	MNZ (Italy)	YMC (United Arab Emirates)		Points

Colour	Result
Gold	Winner
Silver	Second place
Bronze	Third place
Green	Points classification
Blue	Non-points classification
Blue	Non-classified finish (NC)
Purple	Retired, not classified (Ret)
Red	Did not qualify (DNQ)
Red	Did not pre-qualify (DNPQ)
Black	Disqualified (DSQ)
White	Did not start (DNS)
White	Withdrew (WD)
White	Race cancelled (C)
Blank	Did not practice (DNP)
Blank	Did not arrive (DNA)
Blank	Excluded (EX)

**Bold** – Pole
Italics – Fastest Lap

† – Drivers did not finish the race, but were classified as they completed over 90% of the race distance.
