= Esteban Gini =

Racing driver from Argentina

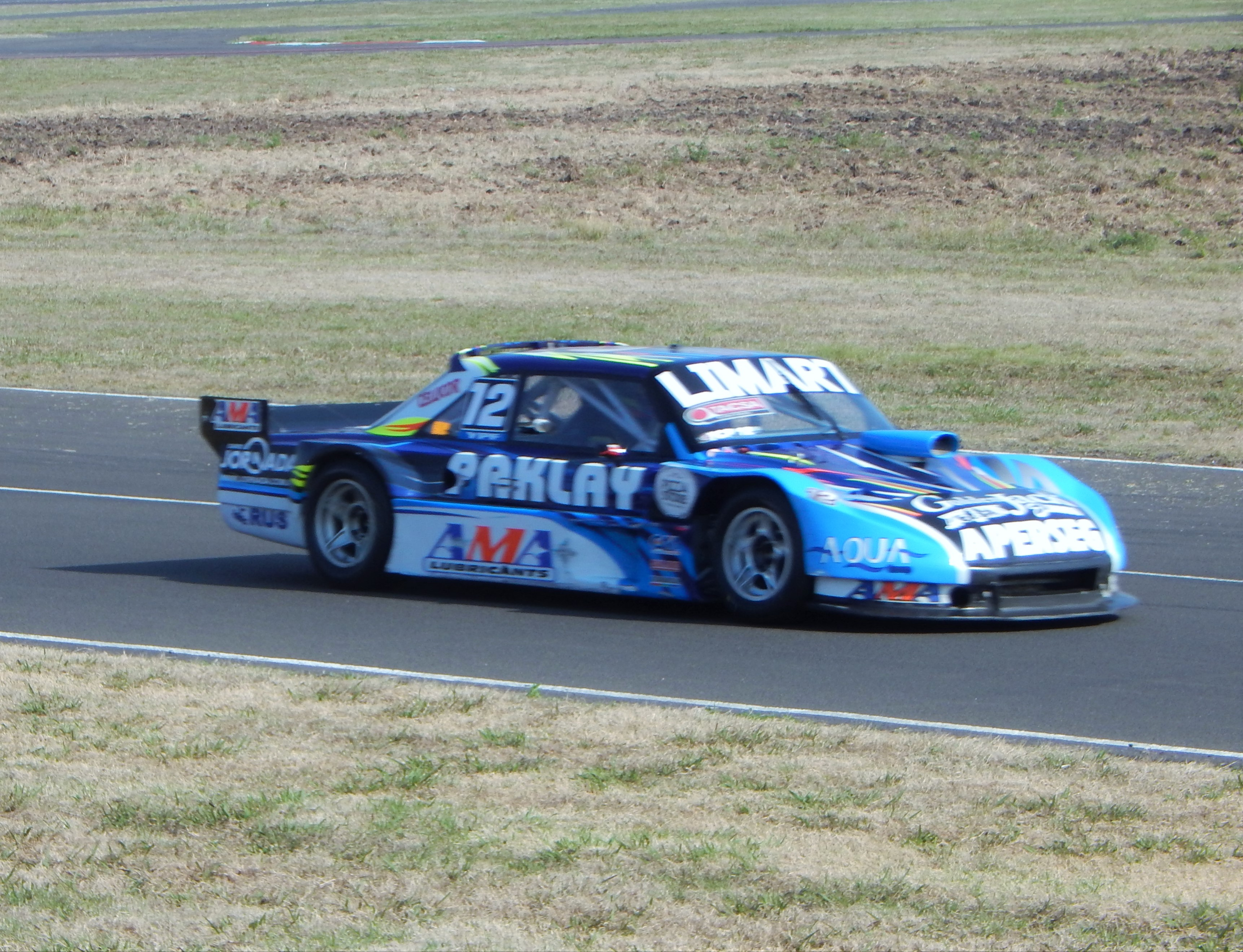
- Gini competing in TC Pista in 2015
- Nationality: Argentine
- Born: 14 July 1989 (age 37) Quilmes, Buenos Aires Province, Argentina

Turismo Carretera
- Years active: 2016–present
- Teams: Nero 53 Team; Alifraco Sport; Di Como Scudería; Maquin Parts Racing
- Starts: 113
- Wins: 1 (Finals); 6 (Heats)
- Poles: 0
- Fastest laps: 2
- Best finish: 4th in 2022

Championship titles
- 2015: TC Pista

Esteban Gini (nicknamed "Tubo", born 14 July 1989) is a racing driver from Argentina, currently competing in Turismo Carretera. He was the champion of the second division category, TC Pista, in 2015.

== Career results ==
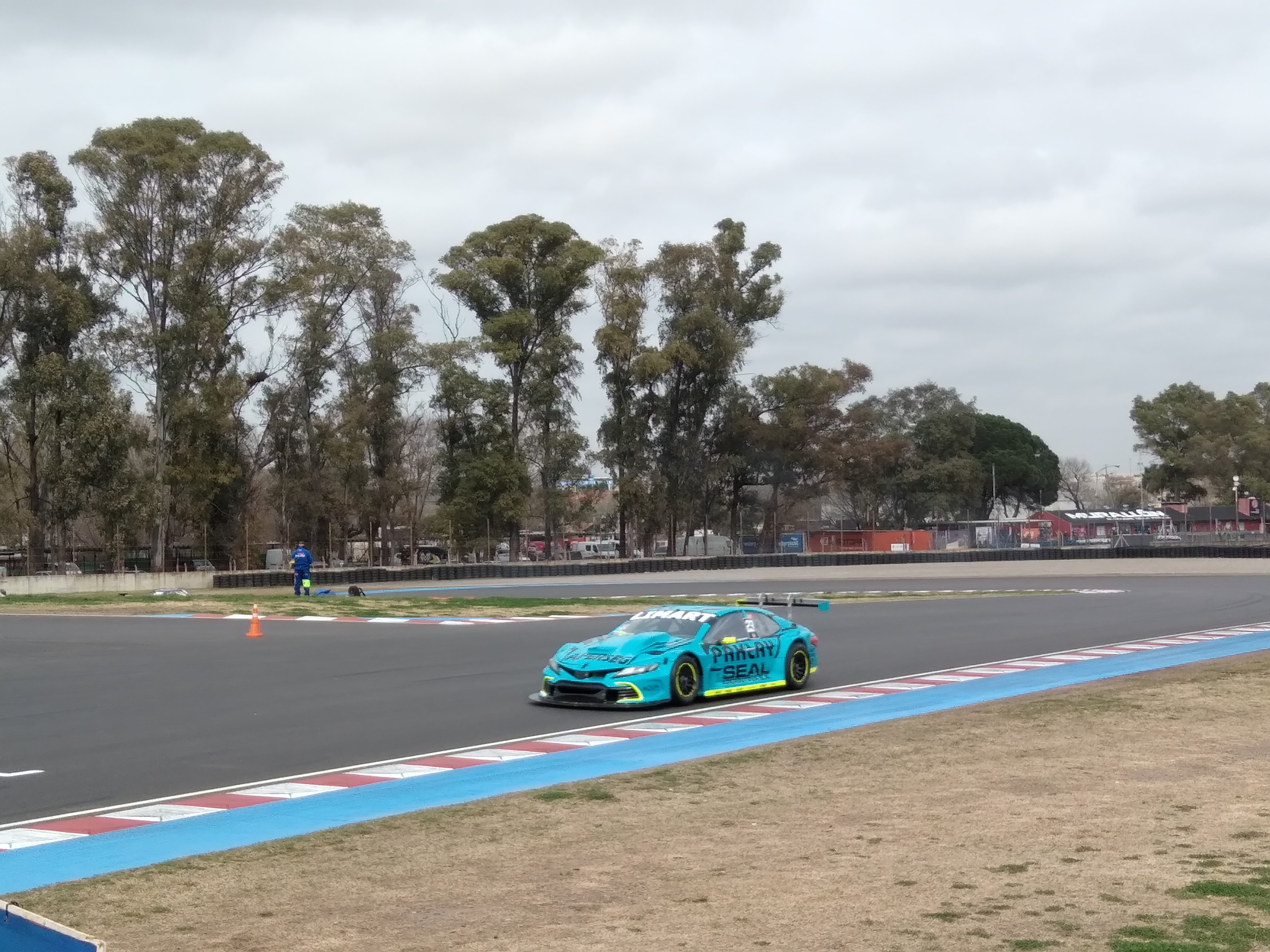
Gini competing in Turismo Carretera in 2024.

=== Summary ===
Season	Series	Position	Car	Team
2010	Turismo Pista – Class 2	18th	Fiat Uno	?
2011	TC Pista Mouras	9th	Dodge GTX Cherokee	Fineschi Racing
2011	TC 2000 Championship	IE (Note: Guest driver ineligible for points.)	Honda Civic Mk.8	Fineschi Racing
2012	TC Mouras	2nd	Chevrolet Coupé SS	Donto Racing
2013	TC Pista	32nd	Chevrolet Coupé SS	WCC Racing
2013	Porsche Supercup	24th	Porsche 911 GT3 Cup Type 991	MRS GT Racing
2013	TC Mouras	38th	Chevrolet Coupé SS	?
2014	TC Pista	12th	Chevrolet Coupé SS	GF Team
2014	TC Mouras	30th	Torino Cherokee	?
2015	TC Pista	1st	Torino Cherokee	Nero 53 Racing
2015	Porsche GT3 Cup Brasil	20th	Porsche 911 GT3 Cup Type 991.II	?
2016	Turismo Carretera	40th	Torino Cherokee	Nero 53 Racing
2016	Porsche GT3 Cup Brasil	15th	Porsche 911 GT3 Cup Type 991.II	?
2016	International GT Open	IE (Note: Guest driver ineligible for points.)	Audi R8 LMS ultra	Drivex
2017	Turismo Carretera	14th	Torino Cherokee; Chevrolet Coupé SS	Alifraco Sport
2018	Turismo Carretera	38th	Chevrolet Coupé SS	Di Como Scudería
2019	Turismo Carretera	33rd	Chevrolet Coupé SS	Di Como Scudería
2019	TC Pick Up	9th	Toyota Hilux Mk.8	Dole Racing
2020	Turismo Carretera	6th	Torino Cherokee	Maquin Parts Racing
2021	Turismo Carretera	14th	Torino Cherokee	Maquin Parts Racing
2022	Turismo Carretera	4th	Torino Cherokee	Maquin Parts Racing
2022	Turismo Nacional – Class 3	?	Toyota Corolla E210	?
2023	Turismo Carretera	23rd	Torino Cherokee; Toyota Camry XV70 2022	Maquin Parts Racing
2024	Turismo Carretera		Toyota Camry XV70 2022; Toyota Camry XV70 2024	Maquin Parts Racing
2024	TC2000 Championship	IE (Note: Guest driver ineligible for points.)	Toyota Corolla E210	Corsi Sport
