= Kévin Estre =

French racing driver (born 1988)

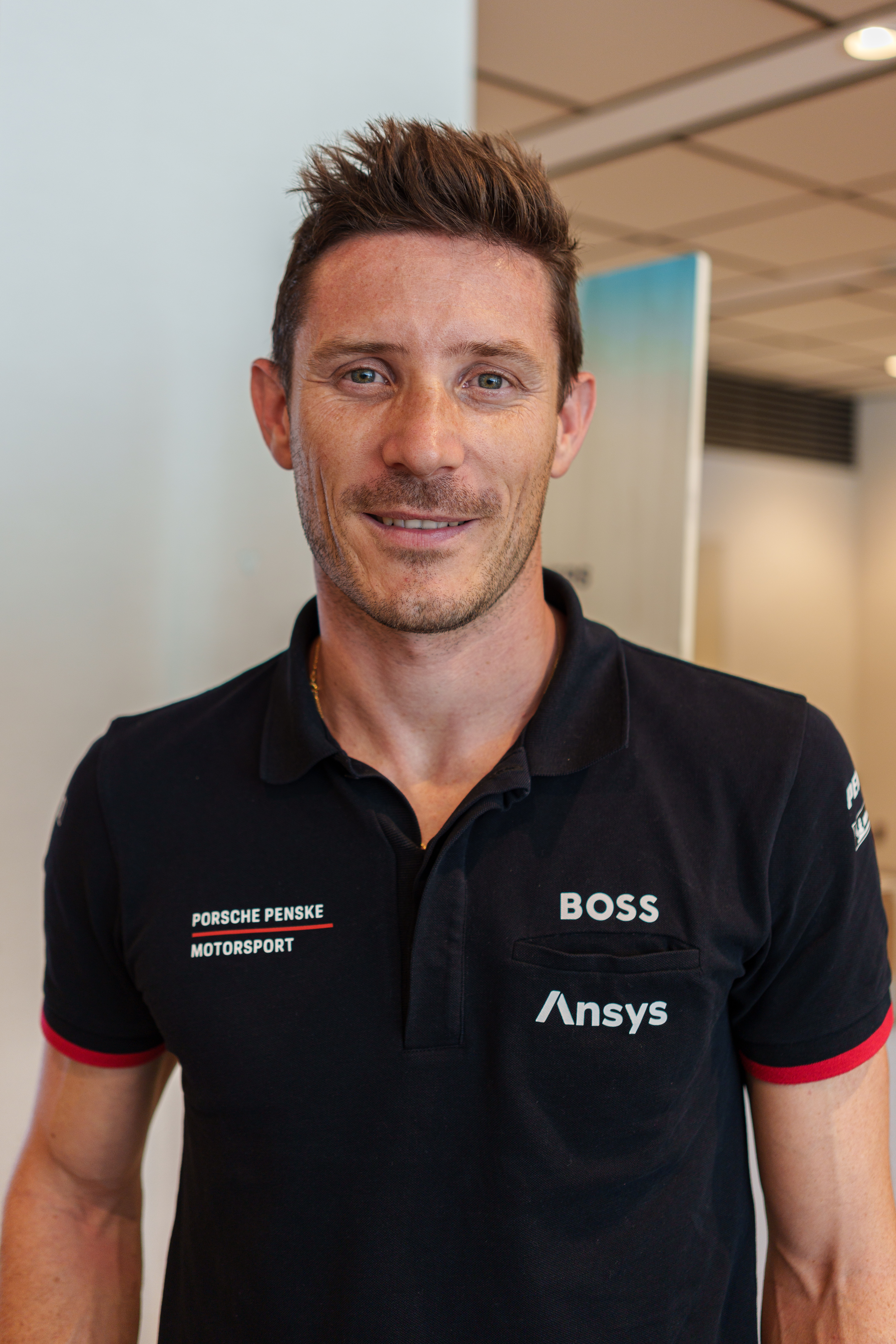
- Estre in 2024
- Nationality: (France) French
- Born: 28 October 1988 (age 38) Lyon, France

FIA World Endurance Championship career
- Debut season: 2015
- Current team: Porsche Penske Motorsport
- Categorisation: FIA Gold (until 2013); FIA Platinum (2014–)
- Car number: 6
- Former teams: Porsche GT Team, Proton Competition, Porsche Team Manthey
- Starts: 62
- Championships: 2 (2018-19, 2024)
- Wins: 11
- Podiums: 36
- Poles: 13
- Fastest laps: 8
- Best finish: 1st in 2018-19 (LMGTE Pro), 2024 (HY)

Previous series
- 2014–15 2014 2013 2011–14 2011–13 2009–10 2008–14 2007 2006: United SportsCar Championship; Blancpain Endurance Series; FFSA GT Championship; Porsche Supercup; Porsche Carrera Cup Germany; FIA GT3 European Championship; Porsche Carrera Cup France; French Formula Renault 2.0; Formula Renault Campus France

Championship titles
- 2024 2018–19 2013 2011 2006: FIA World Endurance Championship; World Endurance GTE Drivers' Championship; Porsche Carrera Cup Germany; Porsche Carrera Cup France; Formula Renault Campus France

Kévin Estre (born 28 October 1988) is a French professional racing driver. A Porsche factory driver since 2016, he competes in the IMSA WeatherTech SportsCar Championship for Porsche Penske Motorsport in the GTP class. Estre is a two-time FIA World Endurance champion—in LMGTE in 2018–19 alongside Michael Christensen, and in Hypercar in 2024 alongside André Lotterer and Laurens Vanthoor.

== Early career ==
=== Karting ===
Born in Lyon, Estre began his racing career in karting, contesting the 2001 French Cadet Championship and taking his first title. In 2004, he won the European ICA Championship, beating Jon Lancaster in the title competition.

=== Formula Renault ===
In 2006, Estre began his graduation to single-seater racing by running in Formula Campus by Renault and Elf which he won by the smallest of margins, equal on points with Tristan Vautier, taking six wins and a total of twelve podium finishes from thirteen races.

For the 2007 season, Estre graduated into the French Formula Renault 2.0 championship for Graff Racing. He finished ninth, taking nine point-scoring finishes from thirteen races.

== Sportscar career ==
Estre decided to switch to sportscars in 2008, continuing his collaboration with Graff Racing into the Porsche Carrera Cup France. He won a race at the final round of the season at Magny-Cours and scored another three podiums, finishing fifth overall.

Estre remained in the series for 2009, but switched to Sofrev — ASP. This time, he added race victories at Nogaro, Le Castellet and Circuit de Lédenon, improving to fourth position in the series standings. As well as this, Estre competed in the Le Castellet round of the 2009 FIA GT3 European Championship season with MP Racing.

In 2010, Estre continued his participation in the Porsche Carrera Cup France with Sofrev — ASP. He again scored five wins, with a total of twelve podium finishes. This allowed him to enter the title battle with Frédéric Makowiecki, but Estre finished the season as runner-up to Makowiecki, by two points. Estre also raced with Mühlner Motorsport in the opening two rounds of the 2010 FIA GT3 European Championship season and the season-opening Oschersleben round of the 2010 ADAC GT Masters season.

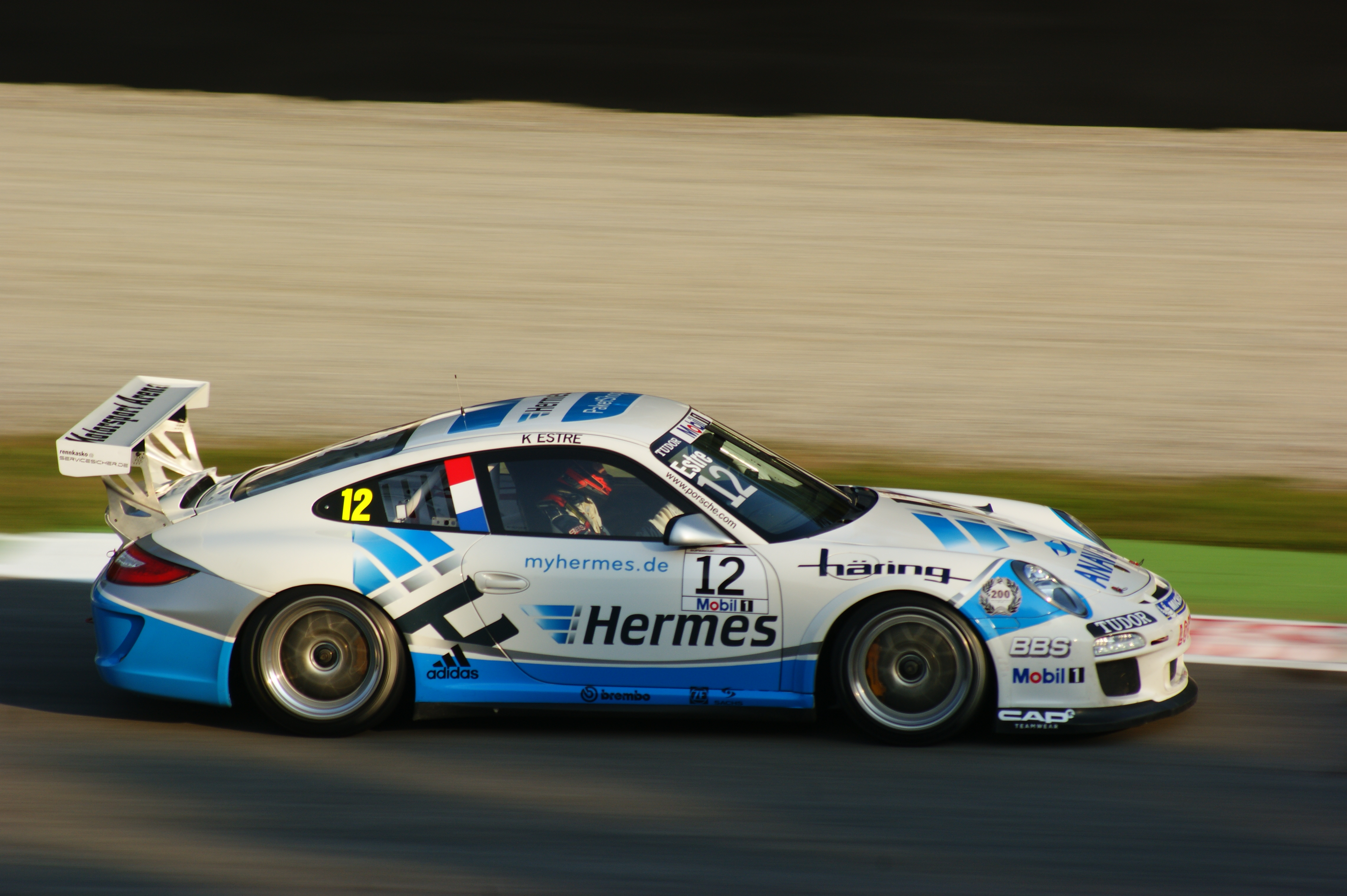
Estre at the 2011 Monza Porsche Supercup round.

In 2011, Estre remained in the Porsche Carrera Cup France for a fourth successive year, but he joined the AS Events team. He dominated the season, amassing ten wins and took the championship title with an eventual margin of 113 points over his closest championship rival, Sylvain Noël. Additionally he made his début in both the Porsche Supercup and the Porsche Carrera Cup Germany with Attempto Racing. In the Supercup, he raced on a full-time basis, finishing seventh with a win at Monza. In the German series, he only competed at the Norisring.

For 2012, Estre decided to concentrate on the Supercup and the German series, continuing with Attempto Racing. In the Supercup, he finished as runner-up to René Rast, with one win at the Hungaroring. In the German series, he finished fourth, winning the 24 Hours Nürburgring support race held on the Nordschleife. He qualified on pole position for the 24 Hours with a laptime of 8:10.9, averaging 186.1 km/h.

Estre also had a part-time schedule in the French series, contesting five races with Nourry Competition.

In 2013, Estre prolonged his collaboration with Attempto Racing in the Supercup and German series. He scored three podium finishes to end the season fourth in the Supercup, while in the German series, he dominated from the start of the season, collecting eight race wins in seventeen races to take the championship title.

In 2014, Estre became a McLaren GT factory driver, joining the ART Grand Prix squad in the Blancpain Endurance Series. He competed in the No. 99 McLaren MP4-12C GT3 with Kevin Korjus and Andy Soucek. The crew achieved two podiums, finishing the season in eighth position in the Pro Cup standings.

In 2015, Estre joined Chris Cumming and Laurens Vanthoor in OAK Racing in the LMP2 class of the 24 Hours of Le Mans. Also, he would stay in the Blancpain Endurance Series, but would switch to Von Ryan Racing. He would race in the No. 58 McLaren 650S GT3 with Rob Bell and Shane van Gisbergen. He also competes for McLaren at the Blancpain Sprint Series for Attempto Racing, partnering with Bell.

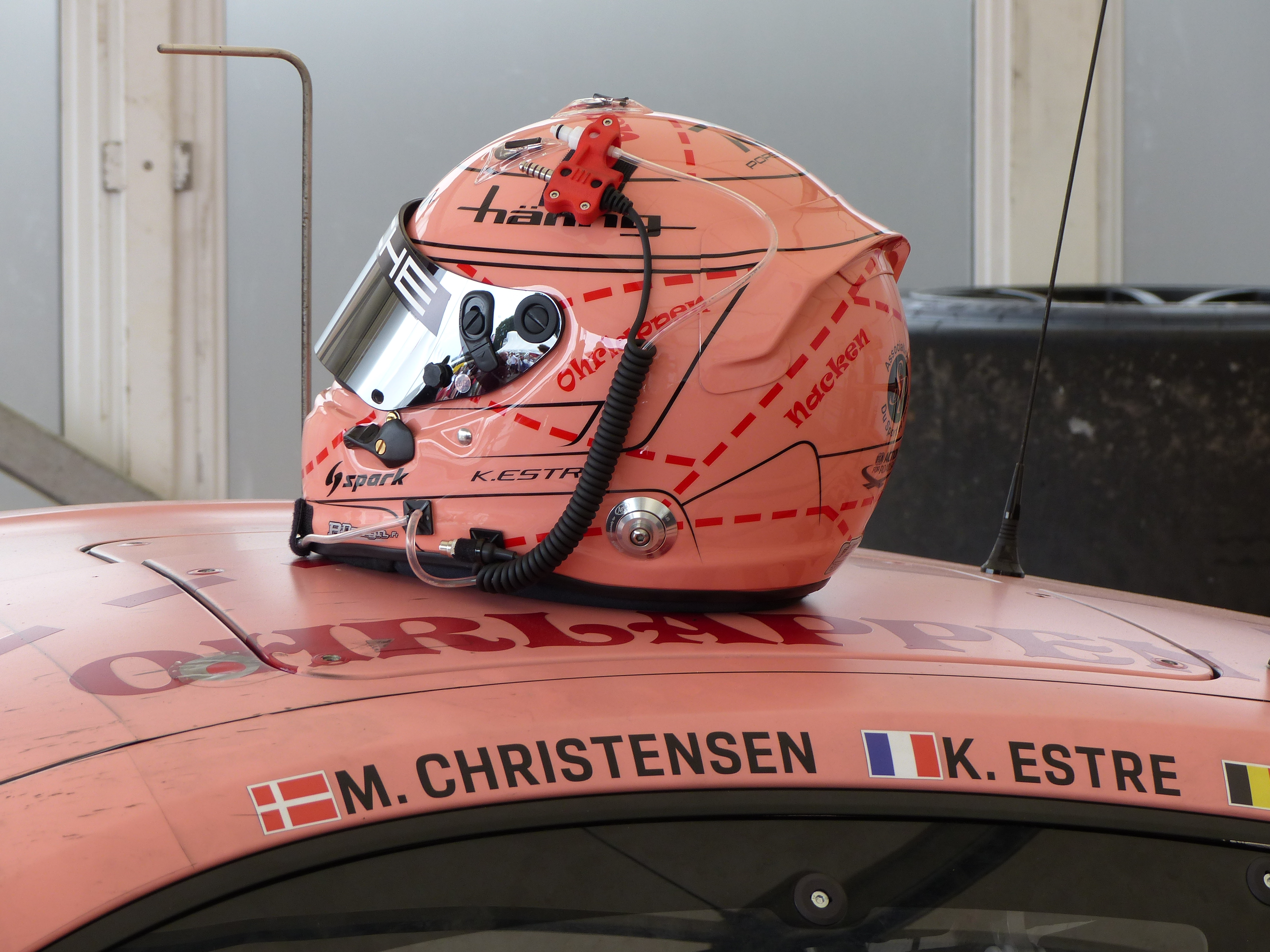
Estre painted his helmet in the same colours as the Porsche he drove at the 2018 24 Hours of Le Mans. The car was in turn painted in honour of the Pink Pig Porsche 917, which raced at the 1971 24 Hours of Le Mans, and which had a similar porcine hue.

In addition, Estre competed at the Pirelli World Challenge, where he drove a K-Pax Racing McLaren to fifth place in the GT drivers standings. Also, he drove a Porsche 911 GT America at the 24 Hours of Daytona for Park Place Motorsports, and competed for the Porsche factory team at the 6 Hours of Spa-Francorchamps on a Porsche 911 RSR.

Estre also competed at the 2025 24 Hours of Nürburgring, finishing second overall after a 100s time penalty.

== Hypercar career ==
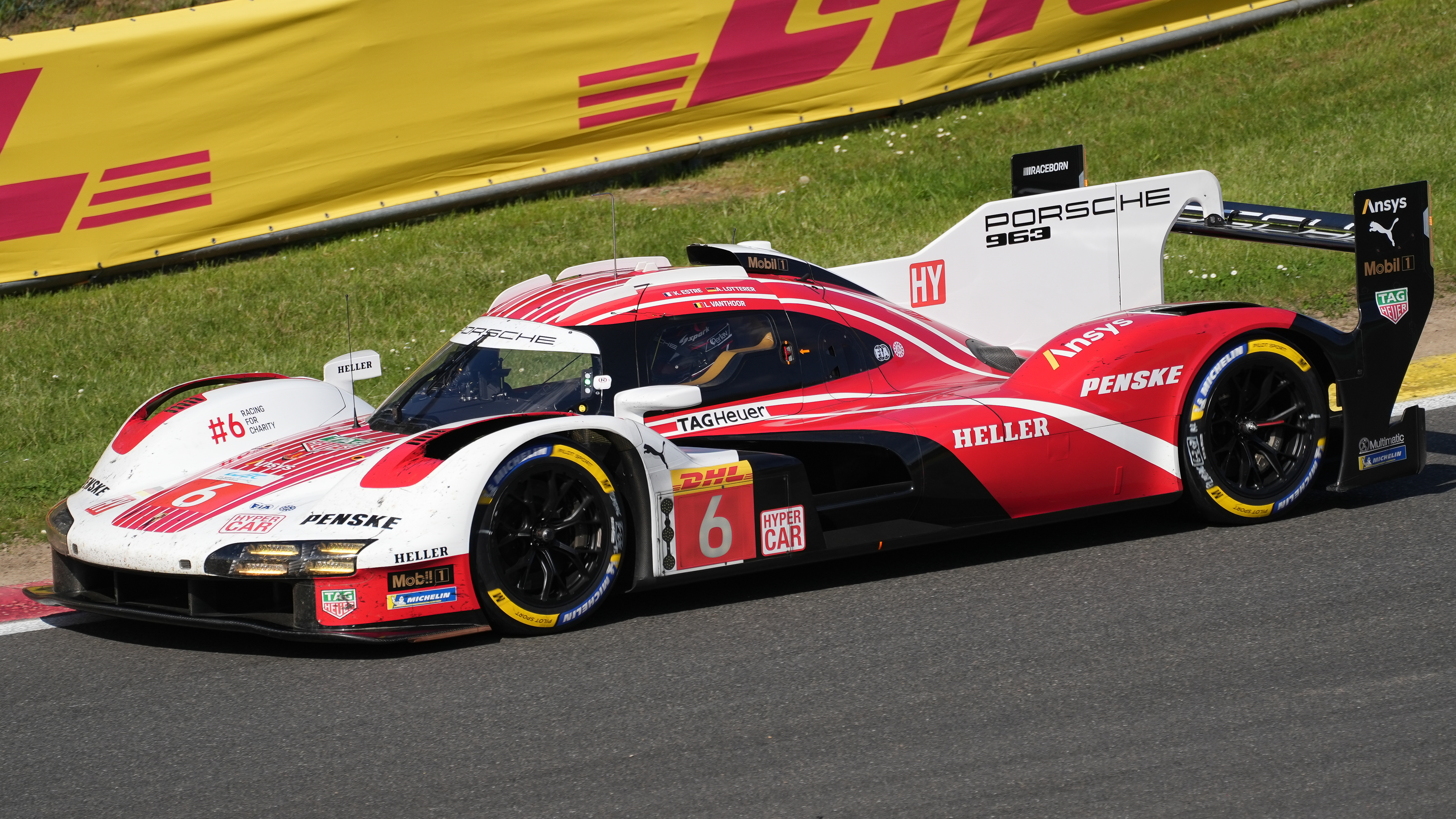
Estre at the 2024 6 Hours of Spa-Francorchamps where he finished second.

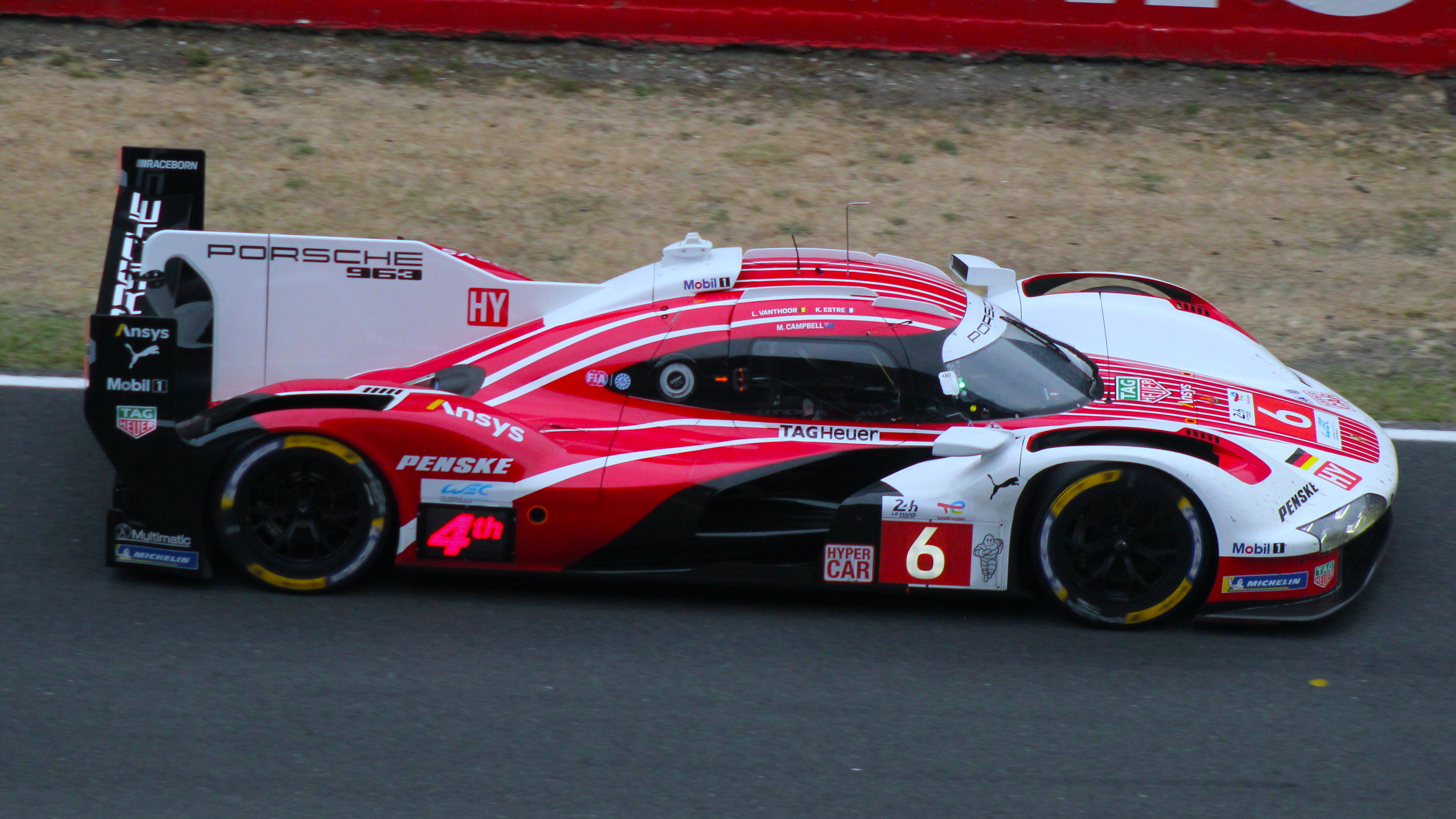
Estre's No. 6 car at the 2025 24 Hours of Le Mans

Estre would move to the Porsche Penske Motorsport Hypercar programme for the 2023 season of the World Endurance Championship, competing alongside André Lotterer and Laurens Vanthoor in a Porsche 963. The trio scored two podiums, finishing third at Portimão and Fuji respectively to end up sixth in the standings.

For the 2024 season, Estre, Vanthoor, and Lotterer were retained as part of the No. 6's lineup. At the season opener in Qatar a controlling performance earned the team their first victory with the 963.

== Racing record ==
=== Career summary ===
Season	Series	Team	Races	Wins	Poles	F/Laps	Podiums	Points	Position
2006	Formula Renault Campus France	La Filiere	13	6	5	3	12	195	**1st**
2007	Championnat de France Formula Renault 2.0	Graff Racing	13	0	0	0	0	46	8th
2008	Porsche Carrera Cup France	Graff Racing	14	1	0	0	4	108	5th
2009	Porsche Carrera Cup France	Sofrev - ASP	14	5	2	6	6	146	4th
2009	FIA GT3 European Championship	MP Racing	2	0	0	0	0	0	NC
2010	Porsche Carrera Cup France	Sofrev - ASP	13	5	7	3	12	200	**2nd**
2010	FIA GT3 European Championship	Mühlner Motorsport	3	0	0	0	0	0	NC
2010	ADAC GT Masters	Mühlner Motorsport	2	0	0	0	1	8	22nd
2011	Porsche Carrera Cup France	AS Events	12	10	8	10	11	242	**1st**
2011	Porsche Supercup	Hermes Attempto Racing	11	1	2	1	3	127	7th
2011	Porsche Carrera Cup Germany	Hermes Attempto Racing	2	0	0	0	0	6	22nd
2011	Porsche Carrera World Cup	Hermes Attempto Racing	1	0	0	0	0	N/A	6th
2011	NASCAR Whelen Euro Series - Elite	Performance Engineering	2	0	0	0	0	132	27th
2012	Porsche Supercup	Hermes Attempto Racing	10	1	1	0	4	139	**2nd**
2012	Porsche Carrera Cup Germany	Hermes Attempto Racing	17	1	1	1	8	181	4th
2012	International GT Open - GTS	Hermes Attempto Racing	2	0	0	0	0	0	NC
2012	Porsche Carrera Cup France	Nourry Competition	5	3	3	2	3	74	11th
2012	Rolex Sports Car Series - GT	TRG	1	0	0	0	0	16	68th
2012	American Le Mans Series - GTC	JDX Racing	1	0	0	0	0	12	25th
2013	Porsche Supercup	Hermes Attempto Racing	9	0	0	1	3	107	4th
2013	Porsche Carrera Cup Germany	Hermes Attempto Racing	17	8	7	2	11	249	**1st**
2013	FFSA GT Championship	Hermes Attempto Racing	4	2	0	1	2	50	13th
2013	Porsche Carrera Cup France	Hermes Attempto Racing	2	2	2	2	2	N/A	NC†
2013	Dubai 24 Hour - A6-Pro	Hermes Attempto Racing	1	0	0	0	0	N/A	14th
2013	FIA GT Series - Pro	Hexis Racing	2	0	0	0	0	0	NC
2013	Rolex Sports Car Series - GT	Mühlner Motorsports America	1	0	0	0	0	16	62nd
2013	American Le Mans Series - GTC	TRG	2	0	0	1	0	6	29th
2014	United SportsCar Championship - GTD	Park Place Motorsports	8	0	0	0	1	83	31st
2014	Blancpain Endurance Series - Pro	ART Grand Prix	5	0	1	0	2	48	8th
2014	Porsche Supercup	McGregor by Attempto Racing	3	0	0	1	1	21	17th
2014	Porsche Carrera Cup France	Tsunami RT	1	0	1	1	0	0	NC
2014	24 Hours of Nürburgring - SP9 GT3	Dörr Motorsport	1	0	1	1	0	N/A	NC
2014	VLN Endurance - SP9	Dörr Motorsport	2	0	0	0	1	N/A	NC†
2014	ADAC GT Masters	GW-IT Racing Team	2	2	0	0	2	50	18th
2014	Blancpain Sprint Series - Pro	Boutsen Ginion	2	0	0	0	0	0	NC
2014	Gulf 12 Hours - GT3	McLaren GT	1	0	0	0	0	0	**3rd**
2015	United SportsCar Championship - GTD	Park Place Motorsports	1	0	0	0	0	1	56th
2015	FIA World Endurance Championship - LMGTE Pro	Porsche Team Manthey	1	0	0	0	1	15	16th
2015	FIA World Endurance Championship - LMP2	OAK Racing	1	0	0	0	0	0	19th
2015	Blancpain Endurance Series - Pro	Von Ryan Racing	5	2	0	0	2	54	4th
2015	Blancpain Sprint Series - Pro	Attempto Racing	8	0	0	0	1	22	16th
2015	Pirelli World Challenge - GT	K-Pax Racing	20	4	0	2	7	1426	5th
2016	IMSA SportsCar Championship - GTLM	Porsche North America	2	0	0	0	0	46	23rd
2016	FIA World Endurance Championship - LMGTE Am	Abu Dhabi-Proton Racing	1	0	0	0	0	10	17th
2016	24 Hours of Le Mans - LMGTE Pro	Porsche Motorsport	1	0	0	0	0	N/A	DNF
2016	24 Hours of Nürburgring - SP9	Manthey Racing	1	0	0	0	0	N/A	DNF
2016	ADAC GT Masters	KÜS Team75 Bernhard	8	4	2	1	6	143	4th
2016	Blancpain GT Series Endurance Cup - Pro-Am	Attempto Racing	1	0	0	0	0	0	NC
2016	International GT Open - Pro-Am	Attempto Racing	2	1	0	0	1	17	14th
2016	International GT Open - Pro-Am	Garage 59	2	0	1	0	0	17	14th
2017	IMSA SportsCar Championship - GTLM	Porsche GT Team	3	0	0	0	1	78	14th
2017	FIA World Endurance Championship - LMGTE Pro	Porsche GT Team	9	0	1	0	3	67	11th
2017	Blancpain GT Series Endurance Cup	KÜS Team75 Bernhard	1	0	0	0	0	12	22nd
2017	Blancpain GT Series Sprint Cup	Attempto Racing	2	0	0	0	0	1	31st
2018	ADAC GT Masters	KÜS Team75 Bernhard	12	0	1	1	0	52	11th
2018	24 Hours of Nürburgring - SP9	Manthey Racing	1	0	0	0	0	N/A	DNF
2018–19	FIA World Endurance Championship - LMGTE Pro	Porsche GT Team	8	2	1	0	6	155	**1st**
2019	Blancpain GT Series Endurance Cup	GPX Racing	1	1	0	0	1	25	10th
2019	24 Hours of Nürburgring - SP9	Manthey Racing	1	0	0	0	0	N/A	DSQ
2019–20	FIA World Endurance Championship - LMGTE Pro	Porsche GT Team	8	2	3	2	6	148	**3rd**
2020	GT World Challenge Europe Endurance Cup	KCMG	1	0	0	0	0	2	33rd
2021	IMSA SportsCar Championship - GTLM	WeatherTech Racing	3	0	0	1	2	958	9th
2021	FIA World Endurance Championship - LMGTE Pro	Porsche GT Team	6	3	5	0	6	166	**2nd**
2021	GT World Challenge Europe Endurance Cup	Rutronik Racing	1	1	0	0	0	0	NC
2021	24 Hours of Nürburgring - SP9	Manthey Racing	1	1	0	0	1	N/A	**1st**
2022	FIA World Endurance Championship - LMGTE Pro	Porsche GT Team	6	1	2	0	4	132	**2nd**
2022	GT World Challenge Europe Endurance Cup	GPX Martini Racing	1	0	0	0	0	6	29th
2022	24 Hours of Nürburgring - SP9	Manthey Racing	1	0	0	0	0	N/A	DNF
2023	IMSA SportsCar Championship - GTD	VOLT Racing with Wright Motorsports	1	0	0	0	0	215	58th
2023	IMSA SportsCar Championship - GTD Pro	Pfaff Motorsports	1	0	0	0	1	348	22nd
2023	FIA World Endurance Championship - Hypercar	Porsche Penske Motorsport	7	0	0	0	2	71	6th
2023	Supercars Championship	Grove Racing	2	0	0	0	0	348	31st
2023	GT World Challenge Europe Endurance Cup	Manthey EMA	1	0	0	0	0	20	13th
2023	24 Hours of Nürburgring - SP9	Manthey EMA	1	0	0	0	0	N/A	DNF
2024	FIA World Endurance Championship - Hypercar	Porsche Penske Motorsport	8	2	1	0	5	152	**1st**
2024	IMSA SportsCar Championship - GTP	Porsche Penske Motorsport	2	0	0	0	1	647	23rd
2024	Intercontinental GT Challenge	Manthey EMA							
2024	24 Hours of Nürburgring - SP9	Manthey EMA	1	0	0	0	1	N/A	**2nd**
2024	GT World Challenge Europe Endurance Cup	HubAuto Racing	1	0	0	0	0	0	NC
2024	GT World Challenge Europe Endurance Cup	Schumacher CLRT	1	0	0	0	0	0	NC
2025	FIA World Endurance Championship - Hypercar	Porsche Penske Motorsport	8	1	0	1	3	94	4th
2025	IMSA SportsCar Championship - GTP	Porsche Penske Motorsport	2	0	0	0	2	669	27th
2025	Nürburgring Langstrecken-Serie - SP9	Manthey EMA							
2025	24 Hours of Nürburgring - SP9	Manthey EMA	1	0	1	0	1	N/A	**2nd**
2025	Belcar Endurance Championship - GT Cup	VR Racing by NGT							
2026	IMSA SportsCar Championship - GTP	Porsche Penske Motorsport	9	1	0	1	4	2709	4th
2026	Nürburgring Langstrecken-Serie - SP9	Manthey Racing EMA							
2026	24 Hours of Nürburgring - SP9	Manthey Racing EMA	1	0	0	0	0	N/A	DNF
2026	24 Hours of Le Mans - LMP2 Pro-Am	TDS Racing	1	0	0	0	0	N/A	5th
2026	GT World Challenge America - Pro	Wright Motorsports	1	0	0	0	0	0	NC†

^{†} As Estre was a guest driver, he was ineligible to score points. ^{*} Season still in progress.

=== Complete Porsche Supercup results ===
(key) (Races in bold indicate pole position) (Races in italics indicate fastest lap)

Year	Team	1	2	3	4	5	6	7	8	9	10	11	Pos.	Pts
2011	Attempto Racing	TUR; 8	ESP; 4	MON; Ret	GER; 5	GBR; 4	GER; Ret	**HUN**; 5	BEL; 9	ITA; 1	**UAE**; 3	UAE; 2	7th	127
2012	Hermes Attempto Racing	BHR; 9	BHR; 4	MON; 2	ESP; 8	GBR; 6	GER; 3	HUN; 1	HUN; 5	BEL; 4	ITA; 2		2nd	139
2013	Attempto Racing	ESP; DNS	MON; 6	GBR; 6	GER; 3	HUN; 4	BEL; 7	ITA; 3	UAE; 5	UAE; 2			4th	107
2014	McGregor powered by Attempto Racing	ESP	MON	AUT	GBR; 11	GER; 3	HUN	BEL	ITA; Ret	USA	USA		17th	21

=== Complete IMSA SportsCar Championship results ===
(key) (Races in bold indicate pole position; races in italics indicate fastest lap)

Year	Entrant	Class	Chassis	Engine	1	2	3	4	5	6	7	8	9	10	11	Rank	Points	Ref
2014	Park Place Motorsports	GTD	Porsche 911 GT America	Porsche 4.0 L Flat-6	DAY; 13	SEB; 17	LGA; 9	DET; 18	WGL	MOS; 2	IMS	ELK; 10	VIR; 17	COA	PET; 13	30th	83	
2015	Park Place Motorsports	GTD	Porsche 911 GT America	Porsche 4.0 L Flat-6	DAY; 16†	SEB	LGA	DET	WGL	LIM	ELK	VIR	COA	PET		56th	1	
2016	Porsche North America	GTLM	Porsche 911 RSR	Porsche 4.0 L Flat-6	DAY; 8	SEB; 10	LBH	LGA	WGL	MOS	LIM	ELK	VIR	COA	PET	23rd	46	
2017	Porsche GT Team	GTLM	Porsche 911 RSR	Porsche 4.0 L Flat-6	DAY; 6	SEB; 8	LBH; 3	COA	WGL	MOS	LIM	ELK	VIR	LGA	PET	14th	78	
2021	WeatherTech Racing	GTLM	Porsche 911 RSR-19	Porsche 4.2 L Flat-6	DAY; 6	SEB	DET	WGL	WGL	LIM	ELK	LGA	LBH	VIR; 3	PET; 2	9th	958	
2023	VOLT Racing with Wright Motorsports	GTD	Porsche 911 GT3 R (992)	Porsche 4.2 L Flat-6	DAY; 11	SEB	LBH	LGA	WGL	MOS	LIM	ELK	VIR	IMS		58th	215	
2023	Pfaff Motorsports	GTD Pro	Porsche 911 GT3 R (992)	Porsche 4.2 L Flat-6											PET; 2	22nd	348	
2024	Porsche Penske Motorsport	GTP	Porsche 963	Porsche 9RD 4.6 L V8	DAY; 4	SEB	LBH	LGA	DET	WGL	ELK	IMS	PET; 2			23rd	647	
2025	Porsche Penske Motorsport	GTP	Porsche 963	Porsche 9RD 4.6 L V8	DAY; 3	SEB; 2	LBH	LGA	DET	WGL	ELK	IMS	PET			27th	669	
2026	Porsche Penske Motorsport	GTP	Porsche 963	Porsche 9RD 4.6 L V8	DAY; 4	SEB; 2	LBH; 3	LGA; 6	DET; 8	WGL; 6	ELK; 10	IMS; 3	PET; 1			4th	2709	

^{†} Full points not awarded due to exceeding maximum drive time limitation. ^{*} Season still in progress.

=== Complete FIA World Endurance Championship results ===
(key) (Races in bold indicate pole position; races in italics indicate fastest lap)

Year	Entrant	Class	Chassis	Engine	1	2	3	4	5	6	7	8	9	Rank	Points
2015	Porsche Team Manthey	LMGTE Pro	Porsche 911 RSR	Porsche 4.0 L Flat-6	SIL	SPA; 3		NÜR	COA	FUJ	SHA	BHR		16th	15
2015	OAK Racing	LMP2	Ligier JS P2	Honda 2.8 L Turbo V6			LMS; Ret							19th	0
2016	Abu Dhabi-Proton Racing	LMGTE Am	Porsche 911 RSR	Porsche 4.0 L Flat-6	SIL	SPA	LMS	NÜR	MEX	COA; 5	FUJ	SHA	BHR	17th	10
2017	Porsche GT Team	LMGTE Pro	Porsche 911 RSR	Porsche 4.0 L Flat-6	SIL; Ret	SPA; 6	LMS; Ret	**NÜR**; 3	MEX; 5	COA; 2	FUJ; 3	SHA; Ret	BHR; Ret	11th	67
2018–19	Porsche GT Team	LMGTE Pro	Porsche 911 RSR	Porsche 4.0 L Flat-6	SPA; 2	LMS; 1	SIL; 3	FUJ; 1	SHA; 3	**SEB**; 5	SPA; 3	LMS; 5		1st	155
2019–20	Porsche GT Team	LMGTE Pro	Porsche 911 RSR-19	Porsche 4.2 L Flat-6	SIL; 2	FUJ; 2	**SHA**; 2	BHR; 7	COA; 2	**SPA**; 1	LMS; 11	**BHR**; 1		3rd	148
2021	Porsche GT Team	LMGTE Pro	Porsche 911 RSR-19	Porsche 4.2 L Flat-6	**SPA**; 1	**ALG**; 3	**MNZ**; 1	LMS; 2	**BHR**; 1	**BHR**; 2				2nd	166
2022	Porsche GT Team	LMGTE Pro	Porsche 911 RSR-19	Porsche 4.2 L Flat-6	**SEB**; 1	SPA; 2	LMS; 4	MNZ; 4	**FUJ**; 3	BHR; 3				2nd	132
2023	Porsche Penske Motorsport	Hypercar	Porsche 963	Porsche 4.6 L Turbo V8	SEB; 6	ALG; 3	SPA; Ret	LMS; 8	MNZ; 7	FUJ; 3	BHR; 5			6th	71
2024	Porsche Penske Motorsport	Hypercar	Porsche 963	Porsche 4.6 L Turbo V8	QAT; 1	IMO; 2	SPA; 2	**LMS**; 4	SÃO; 2	COA; 6	FUJ; 1	BHR; 10		1st	152
2025	Porsche Penske Motorsport	Hypercar	Porsche 963	Porsche 4.6 L Turbo V8	QAT; 11	IMO; 8	SPA; 9	LMS; 2	SÃO; 4	COA; 1	FUJ; 3	BHR; 13		4th	94

=== Complete 24 Hours of Le Mans results ===
Year	Team	Co-Drivers	Car	Class	Laps	Pos.	Class Pos.
2015	(France) OAK Racing	(Canada) Chris Cumming (Belgium) Laurens Vanthoor	Ligier JS P2-Honda	LMP2	329	DNF	DNF
2016	(Germany) Porsche Motorsport	(France) Patrick Pilet (United Kingdom) Nick Tandy	Porsche 911 RSR	GTE; Pro	135	DNF	DNF
2017	(Germany) Porsche GT Team	(Denmark) Michael Christensen (Germany) Dirk Werner	Porsche 911 RSR	GTE; Pro	179	DNF	DNF
2018	(Germany) Porsche GT Team	(Denmark) Michael Christensen (Belgium) Laurens Vanthoor	Porsche 911 RSR	GTE; Pro	344	15th	**1st**
2019	(Germany) Porsche GT Team	(Denmark) Michael Christensen (Belgium) Laurens Vanthoor	Porsche 911 RSR	GTE; Pro	337	29th	9th
2020	(Germany) Porsche GT Team	(Denmark) Michael Christensen (Belgium) Laurens Vanthoor	Porsche 911 RSR-19	GTE; Pro	331	35th	6th
2021	(Germany) Porsche GT Team	(Denmark) Michael Christensen (Switzerland) Neel Jani	Porsche 911 RSR-19	GTE; Pro	344	22nd	**3rd**
2022	(Germany) Porsche GT Team	(Denmark) Michael Christensen (Belgium) Laurens Vanthoor	Porsche 911 RSR-19	GTE; Pro	348	31st	4th
2023	(Germany) Porsche Penske Motorsport	(Germany) André Lotterer (Belgium) Laurens Vanthoor	Porsche 963	Hypercar	320	22nd	11th
2024	(Germany) Porsche Penske Motorsport	(Germany) André Lotterer (Belgium) Laurens Vanthoor	Porsche 963	Hypercar	311	4th	4th
2025	(Germany) Porsche Penske Motorsport	(Australia) Matt Campbell (Belgium) Laurens Vanthoor	Porsche 963	Hypercar	387	2nd	2nd
2026	(France) TDS Racing	(Switzerland) Mathias Beche (Canada) Tobias Lütke	Oreca 07-Gibson	LMP2	355	27th	13th
2026	(France) TDS Racing	(Switzerland) Mathias Beche (Canada) Tobias Lütke	Oreca 07-Gibson	LMP2 Pro-Am	355	27th	5th

=== Complete 24 Hours of Nürburgring results ===
Year	Team	Co-Drivers	Car	Class	Laps	Pos.	Class Pos.
2014	(Germany) Dörr Motorsport	(Germany) Sascha Bert (Netherlands) Peter Kox (United Kingdom) Tim Mullen	McLaren MP4-12C GT3	SP9; GT3	48	DNF	DNF
2016	(Germany) Manthey Racing	(New Zealand) Earl Bamber (France) Patrick Pilet (United Kingdom) Nick Tandy	Porsche 911 GT3 R (991)	SP9	1	DNF	DNF
2018	(Germany) Manthey Racing	(New Zealand) Earl Bamber (France) Romain Dumas (Belgium) Laurens Vanthoor	Porsche 911 GT3 R (991)	SP9	66	DNF	DNF
2019	(Germany) Manthey Racing	(New Zealand) Earl Bamber (Denmark) Michael Christensen (Belgium) Laurens Vanthoor	Porsche 911 GT3 R (991.2)	SP9	156	DSQ	DSQ
2021	(Germany) Manthey Racing	(Italy) Matteo Cairoli (Denmark) Michael Christensen	Porsche 911 GT3 R (991.2)	SP9	59	**1st**	**1st**
2022	(Germany) Manthey Racing	(Denmark) Michael Christensen (France) Frédéric Makowiecki (Belgium) Laurens Vanthoor	Porsche 911 GT3 R (991.2)	SP9; Pro	22	DNF	DNF
2023	(Germany) Manthey EMA	(Denmark) Michael Christensen (France) Frédéric Makowiecki (Austria) Thomas Preining	Porsche 911 GT3 R (992)	SP9; Pro	62	DNF	DNF
2024	(Germany) Manthey EMA	(Turkey) Ayhancan Güven (Austria) Thomas Preining (Belgium) Laurens Vanthoor	Porsche 911 GT3 R (992)	SP9; Pro	50	**2nd**	**2nd**
2025	(Germany) Manthey EMA	(Turkey) Ayhancan Güven (Austria) Thomas Preining	Porsche 911 GT3 R (992)	SP9; Pro	141	**2nd**	**2nd**
2026	(Germany) Manthey Racing	(Australia) Matt Campbell (Turkey) Ayhancan Güven (Austria) Thomas Preining	Porsche 911 GT3 R (992.2)	SP9; Pro	24	DNF	DNF

=== Complete 24 Hours of Spa results ===
Year	Team	Co-Drivers	Car	Class	Laps	Pos.	Class Pos.
2014	(France) ART Grand Prix	(Estonia) Kevin Korjus (Spain) Andy Soucek	McLaren MP4-12C GT3	Pro	136	DNF	DNF
2015	(New Zealand) Von Ryan Racing	(United Kingdom) Rob Bell (New Zealand) Shane van Gisbergen	McLaren 650S GT3	Pro	457	DNF	DNF
2016	(Germany) Attempto Racing	(France) Nicolas Armindo (Germany) Jürgen Häring (France) Clément Mateu	Porsche 911 GT3 R (991)	Pro-Am	33	DNF	DNF
2017	(Germany) KÜS Team75 Bernhard	(Denmark) Michael Christensen (Belgium) Laurens Vanthoor	Porsche 911 GT3 R (991)	Pro	546	4th	4th
2019	(United Arab Emirates) GPX Racing	(Denmark) Michael Christensen (Austria) Richard Lietz	Porsche 911 GT3 R (991.2)	Pro	363	**1st**	**1st**
2020	(Hong Kong) KCMG	(Denmark) Michael Christensen (Austria) Richard Lietz	Porsche 911 GT3 R (991.2)	Pro	522	13th	13th
2021	(Germany) Rutronik Racing	(Austria) Richard Lietz (Germany) Sven Müller	Porsche 911 GT3 R (991.2)	Pro	9	DNF	DNF
2022	(United Arab Emirates) GPX Martini Racing	(Denmark) Michael Christensen (Austria) Richard Lietz	Porsche 911 GT3 R (991.2)	Pro	221	DNF	DNF
2023	(Germany) Manthey EMA	(France) Julien Andlauer (Belgium) Laurens Vanthoor	Porsche 911 GT3 R (992)	Pro	537	4th	4th
2024	(Chinese Taipei) HubAuto Racing	(France) Patrick Pilet (Belgium) Laurens Vanthoor	Porsche 911 GT3 R (992)	Pro	88	DNF	DNF

=== Complete Bathurst 12 Hour results ===
Year	Team	Co-drivers	Car	Class	Laps	Ovr. Pos.	Cla. Pos.
2015	(Australia) Keltic Racing	(Australia) Klark Quinn (United Kingdom) Tony Quinn	McLaren MP4-12C GT3	AA	80	DNF	DNF
2017	(Australia) Walkinshaw Racing	(New Zealand) Earl Bamber (Belgium) Laurens Vanthoor	Porsche 911 GT3 R (991)	APP	44	DNF	DNF
2018	(Hong Kong) Craft-Bamboo Racing	(New Zealand) Earl Bamber (Belgium) Laurens Vanthoor	Porsche 911 GT3 R (991)	APP	271	5th	**3rd**
2019	(Australia) McElrea Racing	(Australia) David Calvert-Jones (New Zealand) Jaxon Evans	Porsche 911 GT3 R (991)	APA	37	DNF	DNF

=== Supercars Championship results ===
(Races in bold indicate pole position) (Races in italics indicate fastest lap)

Supercars results
Year	Team	No.	Car	1	2	3	4	5	6	7	8	9	10	11	12	13	14	15	16	17	18	19	20	21	22	23	24	25	26	27	28	Position	Points
2023	Grove Racing	19	Ford Mustang S650	NEW; R1	NEW; R2	MEL; R3	MEL; R4	MEL; R5	MEL; R6	BAR; R7	BAR; R8	BAR; R9	SYM; R10	SYM; R11	SYM; R12	HID; R13	HID; R14	HID; R15	TOW; R16	TOW; R17	SMP; R18	SMP; R19	BEN; R20	BEN; R21	BEN; R22	SAN; R23; 6	BAT; R24; 11	SUR; R25	SUR; R26	ADE; R27	ADE; R28	31st	348

=== Bathurst 1000 results ===
Year	Team	Car	Co-driver	Position	Laps
2023	Grove Racing	Ford Mustang S650	(New Zealand) Matthew Payne	11th	161

Sporting positions
Preceded by Jean-Karl Vernay	Formula Renault Campus France; Champion; 2006	Succeeded by Jean-Éric Vergne
Preceded by Frédéric Makowiecki	Porsche Carrera Cup France; Champion; 2011	Succeeded by Jean-Karl Vernay
Preceded by René Rast	Porsche Carrera Cup Germany; Champion; 2013	Succeeded by Philipp Eng
Preceded by James Calado; Alessandro Pier Guidi	World Endurance GT Drivers' Championship; Champion; 2018-19; With: Michael Christensen	Succeeded by Marco Sørensen; Nicki Thiim
Preceded by Sébastien Buemi; Brendon Hartley; Ryo Hirakawa	World Endurance Championship; Champion; 2024; With: André Lotterer & Laurens Vanthoor	Succeeded by James Calado; Antonio Giovinazzi; Alessandro Pier Guidi
