= Vincent Abril =

French-Monégasque race car driver

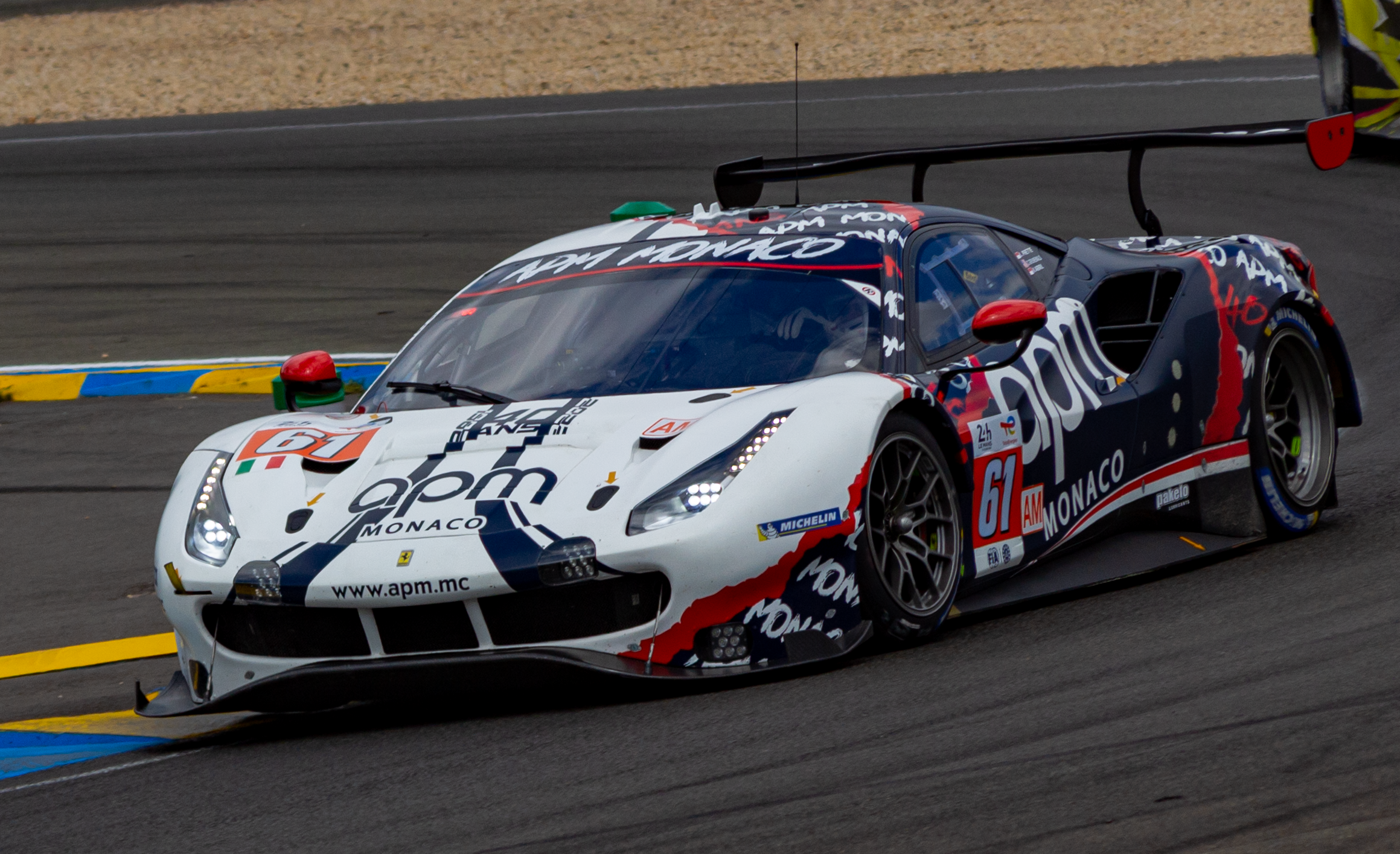
- Abril in 2022.
- Nationality: (France) French (Monaco) Monégasque via dual nationality
- Born: 1 March 1995 (age 31) Alès, France
- Categorisation: FIA Silver (until 2015); FIA Gold (2016–)

24 Hours of Le Mans career
- Years: 2019–2020, 2022
- Teams: Proton Competition, MR Racing, AF Corse
- Best finish: 36th (2019)
- Class wins: 0

Vincent Abril (born 1 March 1995 in Alès, France) is a French-Monégasque racing driver based in Monaco. He was the 2015 Blancpain Sprint Series champion, and primarily raced for Bentley, Mercedes-AMG and Ferrari throughout his professional career.

== Racing career ==
In 2011, Abril raced in the SEAT León Supercopa France series for Team Speedcar. In a season with six top-tens, he finished 15th in the point standings.

In 2012, Abril returned to the SEAT León Supercopa France series. He started the season with a second-place finish at Lédenon followed by a sixth-place finish at the same track the following day. After not finishing in two of the next four races, Abril won his first race in the series at Circuit de Nevers Magny-Cours. In September, Abril finished second and third at Circuito de Navarra. In October, after finishing third in the first race at Circuit Paul Ricard, Abril got his second win of the season at the season finale, which led to a fourth-place finish in the points standings.

For 2013, Abril moved to the French GT Championship series, driving an Audi R8 LMS Ultra for Team Speed Car. The season didn't start very well, as Abril finished outside the top-ten in the first four races of the season. However, the following month, Abril got his first pole, and race win of the season at Spa-Francorchamps which was then followed by a third-place finish the race after at the same track. The same month, Abril had a one-off race at Circuit Paul Ricard with Team Speed Car in the Blancpain Endurance Series, where he finished in 17th. In August, Abril returned to the French GT Championship racing at Val de Vienne where he finished seventh and 14th. The following month, Abril got back to back wins at the Circuit de Nevers Magny-Cours. These wins would eventually help Abril to a fourth-place finish in the points standings.

Abril raced in two series throughout 2014, racing for Team Speed Car in the Championnat de France series, and for the Belgian Audi Club Team WRT in the Blancpain GT Series Sprint Cup. This would be a down year for Abril, as he only finished on podium once in both series, and also finished 14th in both point standings.

In 2015, Abril started the year driving for Bentley Team HTP in both the Blancpain GT Series Sprint Cup and the Blancpain Endurance Series. Even though he didn't show results in the Blancpain Endurance Series, where he finished 20th in the points standings, Abril got four wins, eight podium finishes, and ten top-fives throughout the season, which helped Abril win the 2015 Blancpain GT Series Sprint Cup championship along with teammate Maximilian Buhk. In December, Abril raced in the 2015 running of the Sepang 12 Hours for the Bentley Team M-Sport finishing in tenth.

2016 was another season to forget for Abril as he returned to the Blancpain GT Series Sprint Cup Series and the Blancpain Endurance Series. This year however, Abril didn't run the entire season, also failing to finish on the podium even once. This led to Abril finishing 25th in the BES and 24th in the BGTSSC. In 2016, Abril also ran a race in the Intercontinental GT Challenge series at Spa-Francorchamps where he finished 14th place.

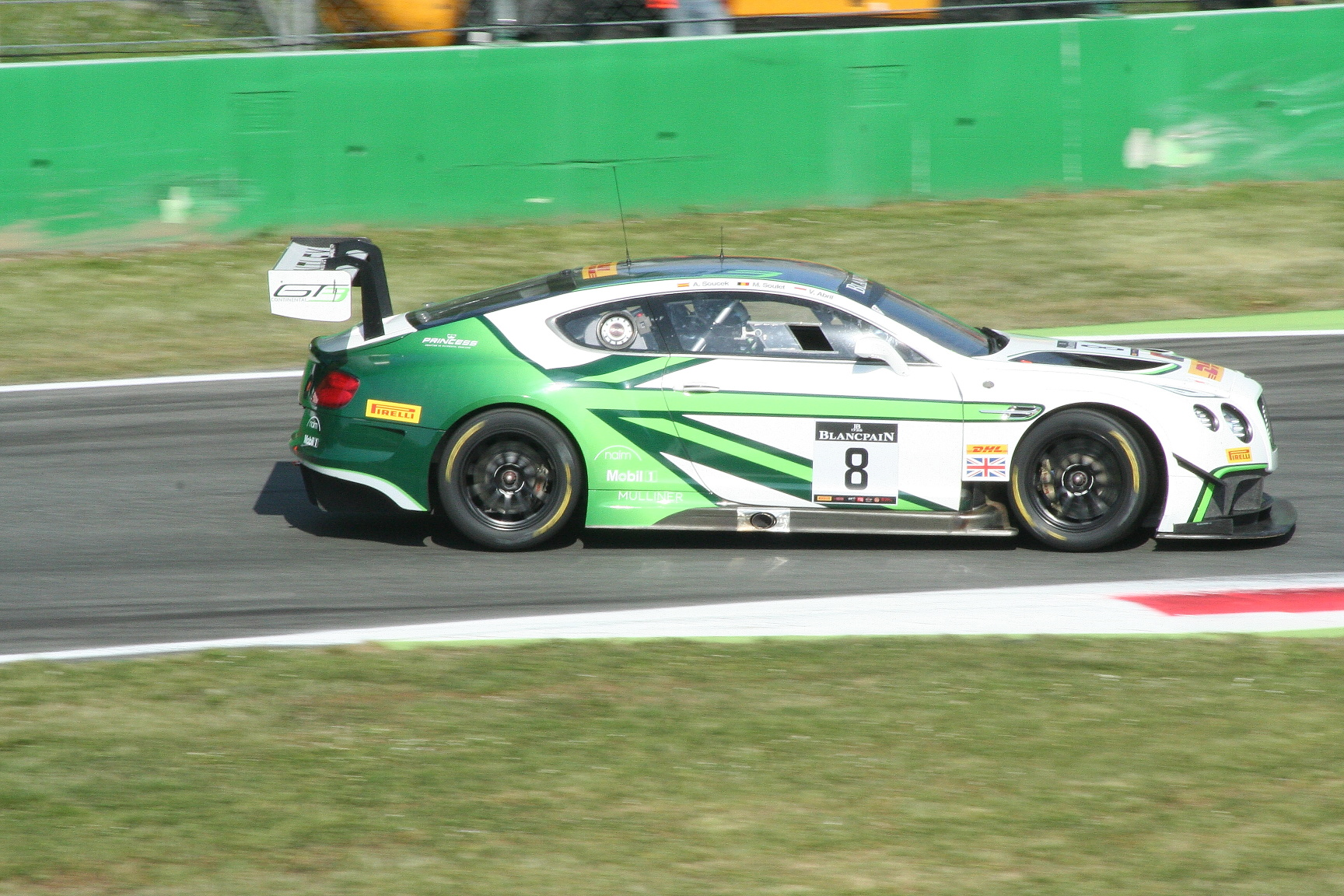
Abril was Blancpain GT Series Endurance Cup runner-up in 2017 for Bentley.

In 2017, for the first time in his career, Abril raced in the Liqui Moly Bathurst 12 Hour, driving the No. 8 Bentley Continental GT3 for Bentley Team M-Sport along with drivers Andy Soucek and Maxime Soulet. The trio started fifth and drove the car to a 12th-place finish overall, fifth in their class. After Bathurst, Abril returned to both series again. In the Blancpain Endurance Series, he finished second in the standings after winning a race at Circuit Paul Ricard and getting on the podium two times. Abril also joined the Pirelli World Challenge, finishing the season 13th in the point standings after having a highest finish of sixth.

In 2018, Abril again raced in the Liqui Moly Bathurst 12 Hour, again with Soucek and Soulet. This time however, a tire issue 58 laps in caused the trio to exit the race early, resulting in a 46th-place finish overall.

In 2019, Abril, Soucek, and Soulet again raced in the Liqui Moly Bathurst 12 Hour, this time, piloting their car to a sixth-place finish overall, a career high finish for the three drivers. Abril also won three times for Mercedes-linked AKKA ASP Team en route to third in the Blancpain GT World Challenge Europe, and drove the No. 78 Porsche 911 for Proton Competition in the 2019 running of the 24 Hours of Le Mans with drivers Louis and Phillipe Prette. They would finish 36th overall after qualifying in 50th.

For 2021, Abril joined the DTM as the championship swapped to GT3 regulations. Driving for Mercedes-AMG Team HRT, Abril took pole position for the first race of the season, but slipped back to second in the race. He was later disqualified from both races as well as qualifying, meaning he lost the points for pole position, due to fuel irregularities. He ended the season 14th.

In 2022, Abril switched to McLaren machinery, signing a contract JP Motorsport and making a full-time switch to GT World Challenge Europe Endurance Cup. The Monégasque also contested Asian Le Mans Series, placing fourth overall in an AF Corse Ferrari, and took part in the 2022 24 Hours of Le Mans, where he achieved pole position in GTE Am.

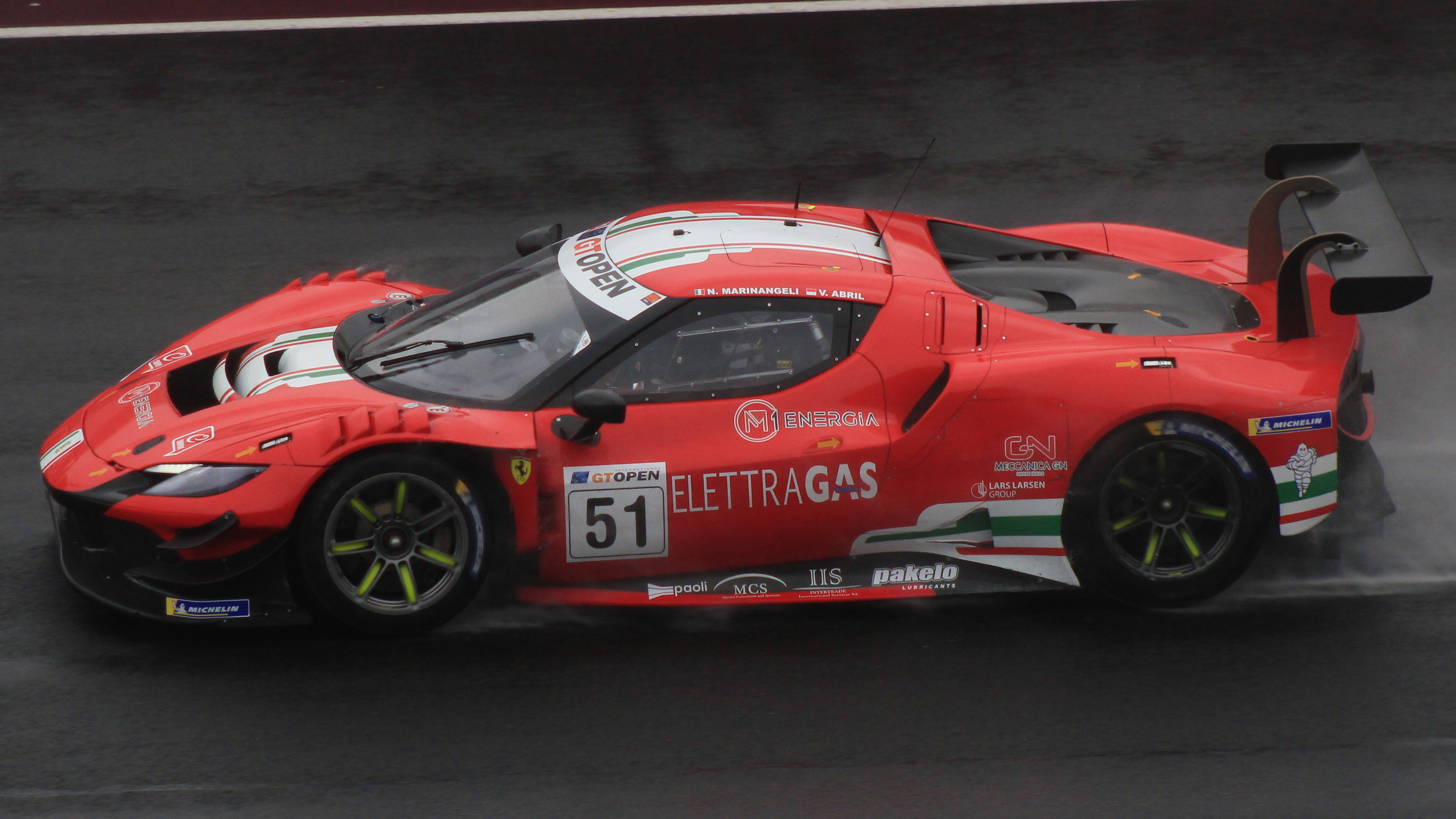
Abril driving his Ferrari 296 GT3 at the Hungaroring in 2024.

After a year spent at Lamborghini-affiliated Iron Lynx in Le Mans Cup, Abril became an official AF Corse driver in 2024. He came third in that year's International GT Open and raced Pro-class Ferraris in GT World Challenge Europe, notably securing a podium at the 2025 24 Hours of Spa with Alessandro Pier Guidi and Alessio Rovera.

On 3 April 2026, Abril announced his retirement from professional motorsport, though he has continued to race at a professional level throughout the season.

== Racing record ==
=== Career summary ===
Season	Series	Team	Races	Wins	Poles	F/Laps	Podiums	Points	Position
2011	SEAT León Supercopa France	Team Speedcar	11	0	0	0	0	59	15th
2012	SEAT León Supercopa France	Team Speedcar	12	2	0	0	6	216	4th
2013	French GT Championship	Team Speedcar	14	3	1	0	4	125	4th
2013	Blancpain Endurance Series	Speedcar	1	0	0	0	0	0	NC
2014	FFSA GT Championship	Team Speedcar	10	0	0	0	1	50	12th
2014	Blancpain Sprint Series	Belgian Audi Club Team WRT	14	0	0	0	1	28	12th
2014	Blancpain Sprint Series - Silver	Belgian Audi Club Team WRT	14	7	2	7	11	174	**1st**
2015	ADAC GT Masters	Bentley Team HTP	2	0	0	0	0	6	34th
2015	Blancpain Sprint Series	Bentley Team HTP	12	4	1	2	8	135	**1st**
2015	Blancpain Endurance Series	Bentley Team HTP	5	0	0	0	0	10	20th
2016	Blancpain GT Series Sprint Cup	Bentley Team M-Sport	8	0	0	0	0	5	24th
2016	Blancpain GT Series Endurance Cup	Bentley Team M-Sport	5	0	0	0	0	16	25th
2016	Intercontinental GT Challenge	Bentley Team M-Sport	1	0	0	0	0	8	14th
2017	Blancpain GT Series Sprint Cup	Bentley Team M-Sport	10	0	0	0	1	37	6th
2017	Blancpain GT Series Endurance Cup	Bentley Team M-Sport	5	1	0	0	2	79	**2nd**
2017	Intercontinental GT Challenge	Bentley Team M-Sport	2	0	0	0	1	20	7th
2017	SprintX GT Championship	Absolute Racing	10	0	0	0	0	107	13th
2018	Blancpain GT Series Endurance Cup	Bentley Team M-Sport	5	0	0	1	0	17	26th
2018	Intercontinental GT Challenge	Bentley Team M-Sport	4	0	0	0	0	16	15th
2019	Blancpain GT Series Sprint Cup	Mercedes-AMG Team AKKA ASP	10	3	4	0	4	78.5	**3rd**
2019	Blancpain GT Series Endurance Cup	Mercedes-AMG Team AKKA ASP	5	0	0	1	0	9	25th
2019	24 Hours of Le Mans - GTE Am	Proton Competition	1	0	0	0	0	N/A	6th
2019–20	FIA World Endurance Championship - GTE Am	MR Racing	1	0	0	0	0	0	NC
2020	GT World Challenge Europe Endurance Cup	Haupt Racing Team	4	0	0	0	1	40	7th
2020	Intercontinental GT Challenge	Mercedes-AMG Team HRT	1	0	0	0	0	8	17th
2020	International GT Open	AF Corse/APM Monaco	12	4	3	1	5	110	**3rd**
2020	24 Hours of Le Mans - GTE Am	MR Racing	1	0	0	0	0	N/A	DNF
2021	Deutsche Tourenwagen Masters	Mercedes-AMG Team HRT	16	0	1	0	0	34	14th
2021	Intercontinental GT Challenge	Mercedes-AMG Team HRT	1	0	0	0	0	0	NC
2021	GT World Challenge Europe Endurance Cup	BWT Haupt Racing Team	2	0	0	0	0	0	16th
2022	Asian Le Mans Series - GT	AF Corse/APM Monaco	4	0	0	0	3	45	4th
2022	GT World Challenge Europe Endurance Cup	JP Motorsport	4	0	0	0	0	10	26th
2022	GT World Challenge Europe Sprint Cup	JP Motorsport	6	0	0	0	0	9	14th
2022	24 Hours of Le Mans - GTE Am	AF Corse	1	0	1	0	0	N/A	9th
2023	Le Mans Cup - GT3	Iron Lynx	6	1	0	0	2	48	6th
2024	GT World Challenge Europe Endurance Cup	AF Corse - Francorchamps Motors	5	0	1	1	1	17	16th
2024	International GT Open	Spirit of Race	14	2	1	0	5	104	**3rd**
2024	IMSA SportsCar Championship - GTD Pro	DragonSpeed	1	0	0	0	0	229	42th
2025	GT World Challenge Europe Endurance Cup	AF Corse - Francorchamps Motors	5	0	0	1	1	22	13th
2025	GT World Challenge Europe Sprint Cup	AF Corse - Francorchamps Motors	10	1	1	0	2	44.5	6th
2025	International GT Open	AF Corse	5	0	0	0	0	0	63rd
2025	Le Mans Cup - GT3	AF Corse	2	0	0	0	1	0	NC
2026	International GT Open	AF Corse	10	0	0	1	0	8	33rd
2026	Italian GT Championship Endurance Cup - GT3	Spirit of Race	1	0	0	0	0	0	NC†

=== Complete GT World Challenge Europe results ===
==== GT World Challenge Europe Endurance Cup ====
(Races in bold indicate pole position) (Races in italics indicate fastest lap)

Year	Team	Car	Class	1	2	3	4	5	6	7	Pos.	Points
2013	Speed Car	Audi R8 LMS Ultra	Pro	MNZ	SIL	LEC; 17	SPA; 6H	SPA; 12H	SPA; 24H	NÜR	NC	0
2015	Bentley Team HTP	Bentley Continental GT3	Pro	MNZ; 46	SIL; Ret	LEC; 36	SPA; 6H; 32	SPA; 12H; 16	SPA; 24H; 9	NÜR; Ret	20th	10
2016	Bentley Team M-Sport	Bentley Continental GT3	Pro	MNZ; 14	SIL; 8	LEC; 13	SPA; 6H; 7	SPA; 12H; 3	SPA; 24H; 18	NÜR; 9	25th	16
2017	Bentley Team M-Sport	Bentley Continental GT3	Pro	MNZ; 6	SIL; 5	LEC; 1	SPA; 6H; 5	SPA; 12H; 5	SPA; 24H; 2	CAT; Ret	2nd	79
2018	Bentley Team M-Sport	Bentley Continental GT3	Pro	MNZ; 43	SIL; 14	LEC; 36	SPA; 6H; 3	SPA; 12H; 32	SPA; 24H; Ret	CAT; 5	26th	17
2019	Mercedes-AMG Team AKKA ASP	Mercedes-AMG GT3	Pro	MNZ; 39	SIL; Ret	LEC; Ret	SPA; 6H; 4	SPA; 12H; 7	SPA; 24H; 13	CAT; 38	25th	9
2020	Haupt Racing Team	Mercedes-AMG GT3 Evo	Pro	IMO; 15	NÜR; 3	SPA; 6H; 12	SPA; 12H; 4	SPA; 24H; 7	LEC; 6		7th	40
2021	BWT Haupt Racing Team	Mercedes-AMG GT3 Evo	Pro	MNZ; 13	LEC; 38	SPA; 6H; 16	SPA; 12H; 15	SPA; 24H; 36	NÜR	CAT	NC	0
2022	JP Motorsport	McLaren 720S GT3	Pro	IMO; 5	LEC; Ret	SPA; 6H	SPA; 12H	SPA; 24H	HOC; 39†	CAT; 38	26th	10
2024	AF Corse - Francorchamps Motors	Ferrari 296 GT3	Pro	LEC; 17	SPA; 6H; 13	SPA; 12H; 22	SPA; 24H; Ret	NÜR; 10	**MNZ**; 3	JED; 21	16th	17
2025	AF Corse - Francorchamps Motors	Ferrari 296 GT3	Pro	LEC; 15	MNZ; 49	SPA; 6H; 12	SPA; 12H; 3	SPA; 24H; 3	NÜR; 46†	CAT; 33	13th	22

==== GT World Challenge Europe Sprint Cup ====
(Races in bold indicate pole position) (Races in italics indicate fastest lap)

Year	Team	Car	Class	1	2	3	4	5	6	7	8	9	10	11	12	13	14	Pos.	Points
2014	Belgian Audi Club Team WRT	Audi R8 LMS ultra	Silver	**NOG**; **QR**; 7	NOG; CR; 3	BRH; QR; 12	BRH; CR; 6	**ZAN**; **QR**; 11	ZAN; CR; 9	SVK; QR; 6	SVK; CR; 9	ALG; QR; 7	ALG; CR; Ret	ZOL; QR; 17	ZOL; CR; 11	BAK; QR; Ret	BAK; CR; 17	1st	174
2015	Bentley Team HTP	Bentley Continental GT3	Pro	NOG; QR; 8	NOG; CR; 4	BRH; QR; DNS	BRH; CR; DNS	ZOL; QR; 3	ZOL; CR; 2	MOS; QR; 3	MOS; CR; 1	ALG; QR; 1	ALG; CR; 4	MIS; QR; 7	MIS; CR; 2	**ZAN**; **QR**; 1	ZAN; CR; 1	1st	135
2016	Bentley Team M-Sport	Bentley Continental GT3	Pro	MIS; QR; 20	MIS; CR; 17	BRH; QR; 12	BRH; CR; 8	NÜR; QR; 23	NÜR; CR; Ret	HUN; QR; 14	HUN; CR; 10	CAT; QR; WD	CAT; CR; WD					24th	5
2017	Bentley Team M-Sport	Bentley Continental GT3	Pro	MIS; QR; 4	MIS; CR; 2	BRH; QR; 20	BRH; CR; 12	ZOL; QR; 12	ZOL; CR; 5	HUN; QR; 13	HUN; CR; Ret	NÜR; QR; 11	NÜR; CR; 7					6th	37
2019	AKKA ASP Team	Mercedes-AMG GT3	Pro	BRH; 1; 4	BRH; 2; 19	MIS; 1; 2	**MIS**; **2**; 15	**ZAN**; **1**; 1	ZAN; 2; 6	NÜR; 1; 9	NÜR; 2 Ret	**HUN**; **1**; 1	**HUN**; **2**; 1					3rd	78.5
2022	JP Motorsport	McLaren 720S GT3	Pro	BRH; 1	BRH; 2	MAG; 1	MAG; 2	ZAN; 1 Ret	ZAN; 2; 5	MIS; 1; 14	MIS; 2; 12	VAL; 1; 17	VAL; 2; 7					14th	9
2025	AF Corse - Francorchamps Motors	Ferrari 296 GT3	Pro	BRH; 1; 1	BRH; 2; 19	ZAN; 1 Ret	ZAN; 2; 14	**MIS**; **1**; 2	MIS; 2; 4	MAG; 1 Ret	MAG; 2; 4	VAL; 1; 20	VAL; 2; 16					6th	44.5

=== 24 Hours of Le Mans results ===
Year	Team	Co-Drivers	Car	Class	Laps	Pos.	Class Pos.
2019	(Germany) Proton Competition	(Monaco) Louis Prette (Monaco) Phillipe Prette	Porsche 911 RSR	GTE; Am	332	36th	6th
2020	(Japan) MR Racing	(Japan) Kei Cozzolino (Japan) Takeshi Kimura	Ferrari 488 GTE Evo	GTE; Am	172	DNF	DNF
2022	(Italy) AF Corse	(United States) Conrad Grunewald (Monaco) Louis Prette	Ferrari 488 GTE Evo	GTE; Am	339	42nd	9th

=== Complete International GT Open results ===
(key) (Races in bold indicate pole position) (Races in italics indicate fastest lap)

Year	Team	Car	Class	1	2	3	4	5	6	7	8	9	10	11	12	13	14	Pos.	Points
2020	AF Corse/APM Monaco	Ferrari 488 GT3 Evo 2020	Pro	HUN; 1 Ret	HUN; 2; 1	LEC; 1; 4	**LEC**; **2**; 1	RBR; 1; 4	RBR; 2; 2	MNZ; 1; 7	MNZ; 2; 1	SPA; 1; 1	**SPA**; **2**; 4	CAT; 1; 4	**CAT**; **2**; 12			3rd	110
2024	Spirit of Race	Ferrari 296 GT3	Pro	ALG; 1; 6	ALG; 2 Ret	HOC; 1; 3	HOC; 2 Ret	SPA; 14	HUN; 1; 2	HUN; 2; 5	LEC; 1; 4	LEC; 2; 1	RBR; 1; 11	RBR; 2; 2	CAT; 1; 6	**CAT**; **2**; 1	MNZ; 4	3rd	104
2025	AF Corse	Ferrari 296 GT3	Pro-Am	ALG; 1; 9	ALG; 2; 9	SPA	HOC; 1	HOC; 2	HUN; 1; 10	HUN; 2; 7	LEC; 1	LEC; 2	RBR; 1	RBR; 2	CAT; 1	CAT; 2	MNZ; 10	29th	2
2026	AF Corse	Ferrari 296 GT3 Evo	Pro-Am	ALG; 1 Ret	ALG; 2; 5	SPA; Ret	MIS; 1; 5	MIS; 2 Ret	HUN; 1; 1	HUN; 2; 7	LEC; 1; 5	LEC; 2; 4	HOC; 1	HOC; 2	MNZ; Ret	CAT; 1	CAT; 2	10th	29

=== Complete Deutsche Tourenwagen Masters results ===
(key) (Races in bold indicate pole position) (Races in italics indicate fastest lap)

Year	Team	Car	1	2	3	4	5	6	7	8	9	10	11	12	13	14	15	16	Pos	Points
2021	Mercedes-AMG Team HRT	Mercedes-AMG GT3 Evo	**MNZ**; **1** DSQ	MNZ; 2 DSQ	LAU; 1 Ret	LAU; 2; 14	ZOL; 1; 4	ZOL; 2 Ret	NÜR; 1; 12	NÜR; 2; 8	RBR; 1; 9	RBR; 2; 8	ASS; 1 Ret	ASS; 2; 9	HOC; 1; 9	HOC; 2; 9	NOR; 1; 14	NOR; 2; 8	14th	34
