= Nicki Thiim =

Danish racing driver

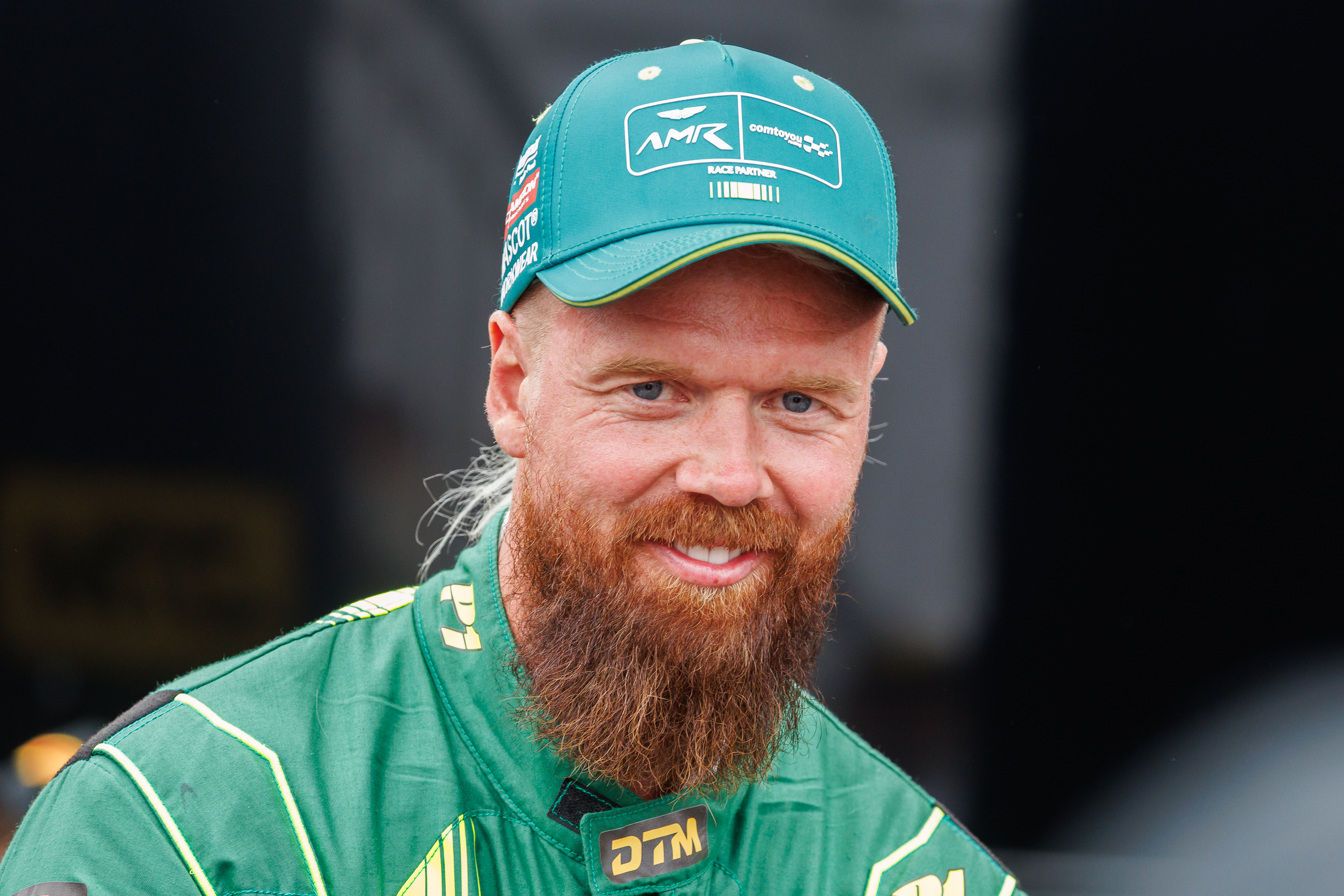
- Thiim in 2026
- Nationality: (Denmark) Danish
- Born: 17 April 1989 (age 37) Sønderborg, Denmark
- Relatives: Kurt Thiim (father)

FIA World Endurance Championship career
- Debut season: 2013
- Categorisation: FIA Silver (until 2012); FIA Gold (2013–2016); FIA Platinum (2017–)
- Car number: 98
- Starts: 55
- Wins: 12
- Podiums: 21
- Poles: 12
- Best finish: 1st in 2016, 2019-20

Previous series
- 2011-12, 14-15 2011-14 2009-15 2007-08: ADAC GT Masters Porsche Supercup; Porsche Carrera Cup Germany; SEAT León Supercopa Germany

Championship titles
- 2016, 2019-20 2013 2008 2006: World Cup for GT Drivers; Porsche Supercup; SEAT León Supercopa Germany; Danish Formula Ford Championship

Nicki Thiim (born 17 April 1989 in Sønderborg, Denmark) is a Danish professional racing driver. He has spent most of his career as an Aston Martin Racing works driver, having won the FIA World Endurance Championship drivers title in 2016 and 2019–20, as well as the 2024 24 Hours of Spa overall win. Thiim currently competes in the Deutsche Tourenwagen Masters and GT World Challenge Europe Endurance Cup for Comtoyou Racing.

== Biography ==
NickiThiim
- Other name: Team Thiim

YouTube information
- Channel: Nicki Thiim
- Years active: 2011-present
- Genre: sim racing
- Subscribers: 24.9 thousand
- Views: 2.7 million
- Last updated: 23 Apr 2026

After competing in karting, Thiim won the 2006 Danish Formula Ford Championship. In 2007, he switched to touring car racing, where he finished fifth in the Seat León Supercopa Germany and raced a BMW 3 Series in the Danish Touring Car Championship. He also won the 2008 Seat León Supercopa Germany with eight wins in 16 races.

Thiim advanced to the Porsche Carrera Cup Germany in 2009, finishing fifth. He also won the SP3T class at the 24 Hours of Nürburgring driving a works Volkswagen Scirocco.

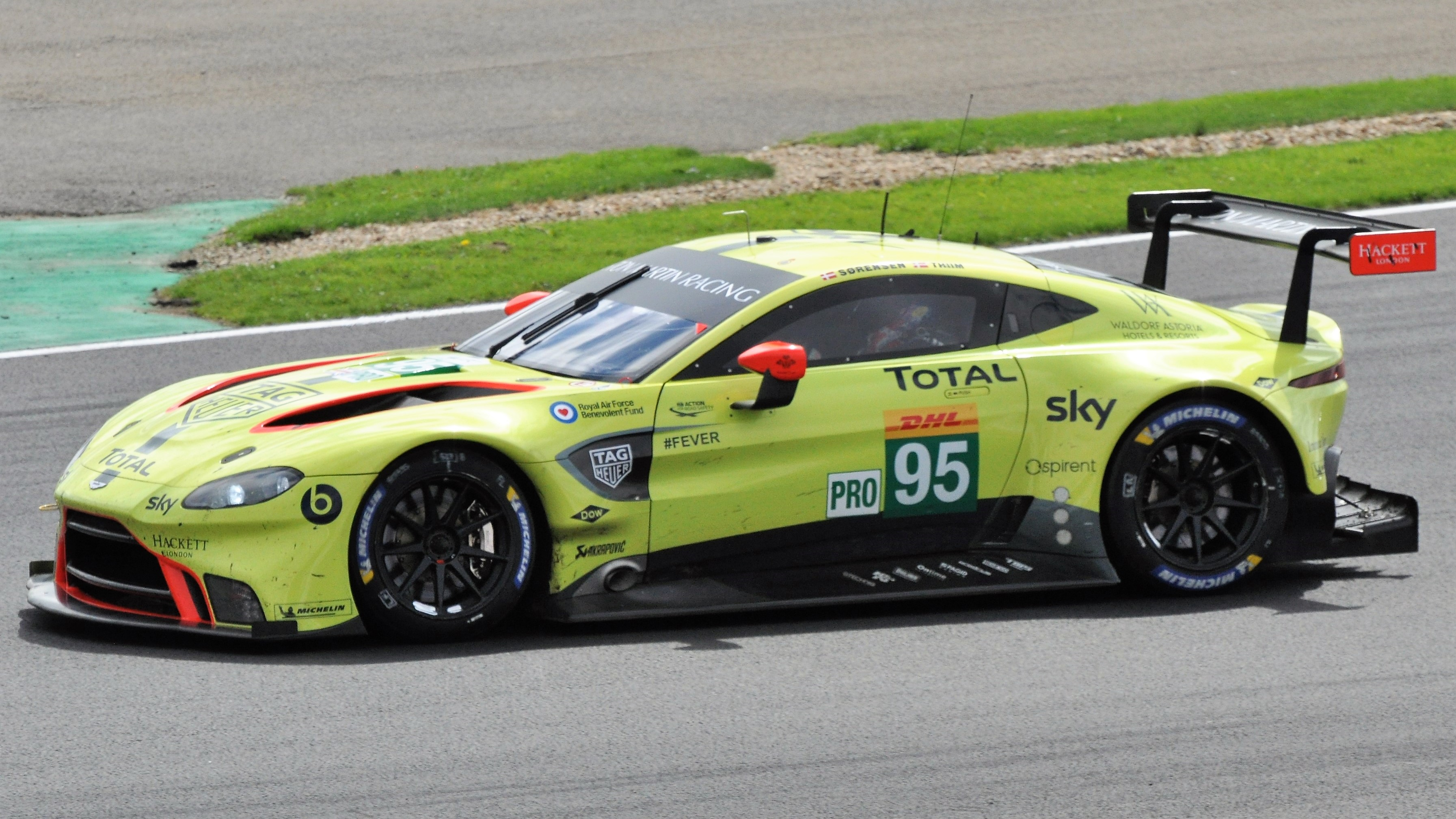
Thiim racing in the 2018 6 Hours of Silverstone.

Thiim finished fourth in the 2011 Porsche Carrera Cup Germany, collecting a win and four podiums.

In 2012, Thiim raced in the Porsche Supercup and Porsche Carrera Cup Germany, finishing third in both. He also got three podiums in the ADAC GT Masters driving a Porsche 911. He continued in both the Porsche Supercup and Porsche Carrera Cup Germany in 2013 and became Porsche Supercup champion. In the same year, he scored the overall victory at 24 Hours of Nurburgring.

After the tragic crash at the 24 Heures du Mans that claimed the life of Aston Martin Racing Young Driver team driver Allan Simonsen, Thiim was the replacement driver for the No. 95 car for the next three races in the 2013 FIA World Endurance Championship season, and subsequently earned a full-time drive for Aston Martin Racing starting in the 2014 FIA World Endurance Championship season. He took the GT Championship with Aston Martin in 2016.

Thiim is a popular driver in the Sim racing scene racing mainly on the iRacing service. He frequently uploads his races on his Twitch and YouTube channels. He often refers to his fanbase as "TeamThiim" and has over 20,000 YouTube followers. As well as frequently streaming his races on Twitch.tv.

Thiim is also well known for his charity 12 hour race where he raised money for Danish children with cancer by hosting a sim racing event attracting over 45 teams and 200+ drivers and raised over 100,000 DKK.

Thiim is also a fan of the Ford Ka, which he believes is a compact yet substantial car to drive.

== Racing record ==
=== Career summary ===
| Season | Series | Team | Races | Wins | Poles | FLaps | Podiums | Points | Position |
|---|---|---|---|---|---|---|---|---|---|
| 2004 | Danish Formula Ford Championship | HP Racing | 11 | 6 | 1 | 3 | 6 | 190 | 4th |
| 2005 | Danish Formula Ford Championship | HP Racing | 6 | 3 | 0 | 3 | 5 | 164 | 4th |
| 2005 | Formula Ford NEZ | HP Racing | 4 | 0 | 0 | 0 | 0 | 10 | 34th |
| 2006 | Danish Formula Ford Championship | HP Racing | 12 | 5 | 3 | 0 | 8 | 281 | **1st** |
| 2006 | Formula Ford NEZ | HP Racing | 4 | 1 | 0 | 0 | 2 | 32 | 13th |
| 2006 | Formula Ford Festival - Duratec | Ray Sport | 1 | 0 | 0 | 0 | 0 | N/A | 8th |
| 2006 | ADAC Volkswagen Polo Cup | N/A | 1 | 0 | 0 | 0 | 0 | 0 | NC |
| 2007 | SEAT León Supercopa Germany | GAG Racing Team | 15 | 2 | 2 | 0 | 3 | 121 | 5th |
| 2007 | Danish Touring Car Championship | Poulsen Motorsport | 6 | 0 | 0 | 0 | 2 | 60 | 17th |
| 2008 | SEAT León Supercopa Germany | GAG Racing Team | 16 | 8 | 5 | 4 | 12 | 265 | **1st** |
| 2008 | 24 Hours of Nürburgring - SP6 | RJN Motorsport | 1 | 0 | 0 | 0 | 0 | N/A | ? |
| 2009 | Porsche Carrera Cup Germany | Attempto Racing | 9 | 0 | 0 | 1 | 1 | 99 | 5th |
| 2009 | 24 Hours of Nürburgring - SP3T | Volkswagen Motorsport | 1 | 1 | ? | ? | 1 | N/A | **1st** |
| 2010 | 24 Hours of Nürburgring - A6 | Volkswagen Motorsport | 1 | 0 | ? | ? | 1 | N/A | **2nd** |
| 2011 | Porsche Carrera Cup Germany | Hermes Attempto Racing | 9 | 1 | 2 | 2 | 3 | 94 | **3rd** |
| 2011 | Porsche Carrera World Cup | Hermes Attempto Racing | 1 | 0 | 0 | 0 | 0 | N/A | DNF |
| 2011 | Porsche Supercup | Hermes Attempto Racing | 1 | 0 | 0 | 0 | 0 | 0 | NC |
| 2011 | Porsche Supercup | SANITEC Aquiles MRS Team | 2 | 0 | 0 | 0 | 0 | 0 | NC |
| 2011 | ADAC GT Masters | Lambda Performance | 2 | 0 | 0 | 0 | 0 | 0 | NC |
| 2011 | 24 Hours of Nürburgring - SP8 | Volkswagen Motorsport | 1 | 0 | 0 | 0 | 0 | N/A | DNF |
| 2012 | Porsche Supercup | Hermes Attempto Racing | 11 | 1 | 1 | 0 | 3 | 123 | **3rd** |
| 2012 | Porsche Carrera Cup Germany | Hermes Attempto Racing | 17 | 3 | 2 | 0 | 7 | 202 | **3rd** |
| 2012 | ADAC GT Masters | Frogreen CO2 neutral | 4 | 0 | 0 | 0 | 1 | 21 | 26th |
| 2012 | ADAC GT Masters | Team GT3 Kasko | 2 | 0 | 0 | 0 | 0 | 21 | 26th |
| 2012 | American Le Mans Series - GTC | NGT Motorsport | 1 | 0 | 0 | 0 | 0 | 7 | 28th |
| 2013 | Porsche Supercup | Attempto Racing | 9 | 4 | 3 | 1 | 6 | 140 | **1st** |
| 2013 | Porsche Carrera Cup Germany | Attempto Racing | 17 | 2 | 4 | 4 | 9 | 217 | **3rd** |
| 2013 | FIA World Endurance Championship - LMGTE Am | Aston Martin Racing | 4 | 1 | 3 | 1 | 2 | 45 | 7th |
| 2013 | 24 Hours of Nürburgring - SP9 | Black Falcon | 1 | 1 | 0 | 0 | 1 | N/A | **1st** |
| 2014 | Porsche Supercup | Lechner Racing Team | 7 | 2 | 2 | 0 | 4 | 91 | 8th |
| 2014 | Porsche Carrera Cup Germany | QPOD Walter Lechner Racing | 15 | 3 | 2 | 3 | 7 | 181 | 5th |
| 2014 | ADAC GT Masters | Prosperia C. Abt Racing | 16 | 0 | 2 | 0 | 2 | 42 | 22nd |
| 2014 | 24 Hours of Nürburgring - SP9 | Prosperia C. Abt Racing | 1 | 0 | 0 | 0 | 0 | N/A | DNF |
| 2014 | FIA World Endurance Championship - LMGTE Am | Aston Martin Racing | 5 | 4 | 1 | 2 | 5 | 144 | **3rd** |
| 2014 | 24 Hours of Le Mans - LMGTE Am | Aston Martin Racing | 1 | 1 | 0 | 0 | 1 | N/A | **1st** |
| 2014 | United SportsCar Championship - GTD | NGT Motorsport | 1 | 0 | 0 | 0 | 0 | 24 | 70th |
| 2015 | Porsche Carrera Cup Germany | KÜS Team 75 Bernhard | 17 | 2 | 2 | 3 | 5 | 169 | 5th |
| 2015 | ADAC GT Masters | C. Abt Racing | 16 | 1 | 0 | 0 | 2 | 87 | 12th |
| 2015 | FIA World Endurance Championship - LMGTE Pro | Aston Martin Racing | 3 | 0 | 1 | 1 | 0 | 41 | 13th |
| 2015 | 24 Hours of Le Mans - LMGTE Pro | Aston Martin Racing | 1 | 0 | 0 | 0 | 0 | N/A | 4th |
| 2015 | TCR International Series | Liqui Moly Team Engstler | 2 | 1 | 1 | 2 | 1 | 30 | 13th |
| 2015 | Blancpain Endurance Series | Phoenix Racing | 1 | 0 | 0 | 0 | 1 | 17 | 16th |
| 2015 | Blancpain Sprint Series | Belgian Audi Team WRT | 2 | 0 | 0 | 0 | 2 | 21 | 19th |
| 2015 | 24 Hours of Nürburgring - SP9 | Audi Sport Team WRT | 1 | 0 | 0 | 0 | 0 | N/A | 7th |
| 2016 | FIA World Endurance Championship - LMGTE Pro | Aston Martin Racing | 9 | 2 | 3 | 2 | 6 | 156 | **1st** |
| 2016 | 24 Hours of Le Mans - LMGTE Pro | Aston Martin Racing | 1 | 0 | 0 | 0 | 0 | N/A | 5th |
| 2016 | 24 Hours of Nürburgring - SP9 | Aston Martin Racing | 1 | 0 | 0 | 0 | 0 | N/A | DNF |
| 2016 | 24H Series - A6-Pro | Massive Motorsport | 1 | 0 | 0 | 0 | 0 | 0 | NC |
| 2017 | FIA World Endurance Championship - LMGTE Pro | Aston Martin Racing | 9 | 1 | 1 | 1 | 1 | 104 | 6th |
| 2017 | 24 Hours of Le Mans - LMGTE Pro | Aston Martin Racing | 1 | 0 | 0 | 0 | 0 | N/A | 9th |
| 2017 | European Le Mans Series - LMGTE | TF Sport | 6 | 1 | 1 | 0 | 5 | 102 | **2nd** |
| 2017 | 24 Hours of Nürburgring - SP8 | Aston Martin Lagonda | 1 | 1 | ? | ? | 1 | N/A | **1st** |
| 2018 | British GT Championship | TF Sport AMR | 9 | 2 | 2 | 1 | 6 | 148 | **3rd** |
| 2018 | Blancpain GT Series Endurance Cup | R-Motorsport | 5 | 1 | 2 | 0 | 1 | 29 | 13th |
| 2018 | 24 Hours of Le Mans - LMGTE Pro | Aston Martin Racing | 1 | 0 | 0 | 0 | 0 | N/A | 8th |
| 2018 | 24 Hours of Nürburgring - SP9-LG | Aston Martin Racing | 1 | 1 | 0 | 0 | 1 | N/A | **1st** |
| 2018–19 | FIA World Endurance Championship - LMGTE Pro | Aston Martin Racing | 8 | 1 | 2 | 0 | 1 | 65.5 | 9th |
| 2019 | British GT Championship | TF Sport | 9 | 0 | 1 | 4 | 1 | 72.5 | 8th |
| 2019 | Blancpain GT Series Endurance Cup | R-Motorsport | 2 | 0 | 0 | 0 | 0 | 0 | NC |
| 2019 | Blancpain GT Series Endurance Cup | Oman Racing with TF Sport | 1 | 0 | 0 | 0 | 0 | 0 | NC |
| 2019 | Blancpain GT Series Endurance Cup - Pro-Am | Oman Racing with TF Sport | 1 | 1 | 0 | 0 | 1 | 49 | 8th |
| 2019 | 24 Hours of Le Mans - LMGTE Pro | Aston Martin Racing | 1 | 0 | 1 | 0 | 0 | N/A | DNF |
| 2019–20 | FIA World Endurance Championship - LMGTE Pro | Aston Martin Racing | 8 | 3 | 1 | 1 | 5 | 172 | **1st** |
| 2020 | IMSA SportsCar Championship - GTD | Heart of Racing Team | 1 | 0 | 0 | 0 | 0 | 13 | 59th |
| 2020 | 24 Hours of Le Mans - LMGTE Pro | Aston Martin Racing | 1 | 0 | 0 | 0 | 1 | N/A | **3rd** |
| 2021 | Asian Le Mans Series - LMP2 | Phoenix Racing | 4 | 0 | 0 | 0 | 3 | 57 | 4th |
| 2021 | FIA World Endurance Championship - LMGTE Am | Aston Martin Racing | 1 | 0 | 0 | 0 | 0 | 0 | NC |
| 2021 | 24 Hours of Le Mans - LMGTE Am | Aston Martin Racing | 1 | 0 | 0 | 0 | 0 | N/A | DNF |
| 2021 | GT World Challenge Europe Endurance Cup | Garage 59 AMR | 1 | 0 | 0 | 0 | 1 | 22 | 13th |
| 2021 | 24 Hours of Nürburgring - SP9 | Phoenix Racing | 1 | 0 | 0 | 0 | 0 | N/A | 16th |
| 2022 | FIA World Endurance Championship - LMGTE Am | Northwest AMR | 6 | 1 | 0 | 0 | 3 | 118 | **2nd** |
| 2022 | IMSA SportsCar Championship - GTD | Northwest AMR | 1 | 0 | 0 | 0 | 0 | 211 | 61st |
| 2022 | 24 Hours of Le Mans - LMGTE Am | Northwest AMR | 1 | 0 | 0 | 0 | 1 | N/A | **3rd** |
| 2022 | Deutsche Tourenwagen Masters | T3 Motorsport | 4 | 0 | 0 | 0 | 0 | 0 | 30th |
| 2022 | GT World Challenge Europe Endurance Cup | Beechdean AMR | 3 | 0 | 0 | 0 | 0 | 6 | 30th |
| 2022 | 24 Hours of Nürburgring - SP9 | TF Sport AMR | 1 | 0 | 0 | 0 | 0 | N/A | DNF |
| 2023 | European Le Mans Series - LMGTE | GMB Motorsport | 6 | 0 | 0 | 0 | 0 | 18 | 17th |
| 2023 | FIA World Endurance Championship - LMGTE Am | Northwest AMR | 2 | 0 | 0 | 0 | 0 | 0 | 29th |
| 2023 | IMSA SportsCar Championship - GTD | Magnus Racing | 1 | 0 | 0 | 0 | 1 | 340 | 46th |
| 2023 | GT World Challenge Europe Endurance Cup | Scherer Sport PHX | 1 | 0 | 0 | 0 | 1 | 24 | 12th |
| 2023 | British GT Championship - GT3 | Beechdean AMR | 1 | 0 | 0 | 0 | 0 | 0 | NC |
| 2023 | 24 Hours of Nürburgring - SP9 | ABT Sportsline | 1 | 0 | 0 | 0 | 0 | N/A | 9th |
| 2024 | Deutsche Tourenwagen Masters | SSR Performance | 16 | 1 | 1 | 2 | 1 | 93 | 13th |
| 2024 | GT Winter Series - GT3 | SSR Performance | 2 | 0 | ? | ? | 2 | 15.72 | 11th |
| 2024 | IMSA SportsCar Championship - GTD | Magnus Racing | 1 | 0 | 0 | 0 | 0 | 90 | 75th |
| 2024 | GT World Challenge Europe Endurance Cup | Comtoyou Racing | 5 | 1 | 0 | 0 | 1 | 55 | 4th |
| 2024 | Nürburgring Langstrecken-Serie - SP9 | Walkenhorst Motorsport | | | | | | | |
| 2024 | 24 Hours of Nürburgring - SP9 | Walkenhorst Motorsport | 1 | 0 | 0 | 0 | 0 | N/A | DNF |
| 2025 | Deutsche Tourenwagen Masters | Abt Sportsline | 16 | 0 | 0 | 0 | 1 | 44 | 18th |
| 2025 | IMSA SportsCar Championship - GTD | Magnus Racing | 1 | 0 | 0 | 0 | 0 | 119 | 89th |
| 2025 | GT World Challenge Europe Endurance Cup | Comtoyou Racing | 5 | 0 | 0 | 1 | 1 | 37 | 8th |
| 2025 | Nürburgring Langstrecken-Serie - SP9 | Walkenhorst Motorsport | | | | | | | |
| 2025 | 24 Hours of Nürburgring - SP9 | Walkenhorst Motorsport | 1 | 0 | 0 | 0 | 0 | N/A | DNF |
| 2026 | IMSA SportsCar Championship - GTD | Magnus Racing | 1 | 0 | 0 | 0 | 1 | 336 | 57th |
| 2026 | Deutsche Tourenwagen Masters | Comtoyou Racing | 16 | 2 | 3 | 2 | 3 | 149 | 6th |
| 2026 | GT World Challenge Europe Endurance Cup | Comtoyou Racing | 5 | 2 | 1 | 2 | 2 | 59 | **2nd** |
| 2026 | GT World Challenge Europe Sprint Cup | Comtoyou Racing | 10 | 0 | 1 | 1 | 1 | 16.5 | 19th |
| 2026 | Nürburgring Langstrecken-Serie - SP9 | Walkenhorst Motorsport | | | | | | | |
| 2026 | 24 Hours of Nürburgring - SP9 | natural elements by Walkenhorst Motorsport | 1 | 0 | 0 | 0 | 1 | N/A | **2nd** |

^{*} Season still in progress.

=== Complete Porsche Supercup results ===
(key) (Races in bold indicate pole position) (Races in italics indicate fastest lap)

| Year | Team | 1 | 2 | 3 | 4 | 5 | 6 | 7 | 8 | 9 | 10 | 11 | DC | Points |
|---|---|---|---|---|---|---|---|---|---|---|---|---|---|---|
| 2011 | Attempto Racing | TUR | ESP | MON | NNS; Ret | GBR | NÜR | HUN | | | | | NC | 0 |
| 2011 | SANITEC Aquiles MRS Team | | | | | | | | BEL; 14 | ITA; 11 | UAE | UAE | NC | 0 |
| 2012 | Hermes Attempto Racing | BHR; 7 | BHR; 6 | MON; Ret | VAL; 4 | GBR; 8 | GER; 5 | HUN; 4 | HUN; 2 | **BEL**; 1 | ITA; 3 | | **3rd** | **123** |
| 2013 | Attempto Racing | ESP; 2 | MON; 8 | **GBR**; 1 | GER; 2 | HUN; 8 | BEL; 8 | **ITA**; 1 | UAE; 1 | **UAE**; 1 | | | **1st** | **140** |
| 2014 | Lechner Racing Team | ESP | MON | AUT | GBR; 20 | **GER**; 1 | HUN; 2 | BEL; 2 | ITA; 6 | **USA**; 1 | USA; 11 | | 8th | 91 |

=== Complete ADAC GT Masters results ===
(key) (Races in bold indicate pole position) (Races in italics indicate fastest lap)

| Year | Team | Car | 1 | 2 | 3 | 4 | 5 | 6 | 7 | 8 | 9 | 10 | 11 | 12 | 13 | 14 | 15 | 16 | Pos. | Points |
|---|---|---|---|---|---|---|---|---|---|---|---|---|---|---|---|---|---|---|---|---|
| 2011 | Lambda Performance | Ford GT GT3 | OSC; 1 | OSC; 2 | SAC; 1 | SAC; 2 | ZOL; 1 | ZOL; 2 | NÜR; 1 | NÜR; 2 | RBR; 1 | RBR; 2 | LAU; 1 | LAU; 2 | ASS; 1 | ASS; 2 | HOC; 1; 21 | HOC; 2 Ret | NC | 0 |
| 2012 | Frogreen CO2 neutral | Porsche 911 GT3 R | OSC; 1; 3 | OSC; 2; 13 | ZAN; 1 | ZAN; 2 | SAC; 1 | SAC; 2 | NÜR; 1; 19 | NÜR; 2; 7 | RBR; 1 | RBR; 2 | LAU; 1 | LAU; 2 | NÜR; 1 | NÜR; 2 | | | 26th | 21 |
| 2012 | Team GT3 Kasko | Porsche 911 GT3 R | | | | | | | | | | | | | | | HOC; 1 Ret | HOC; 2 Ret | 26th | 21 |
| 2014 | Prosperia C. Abt Racing | Audi R8 LMS ultra | OSC; 1 Ret | OSC; 2 Ret | ZAN; 1; 5 | ZAN; 2; 3 | LAU; 1; 20 | LAU; 2; 22 | RBR; 1; 19 | RBR; 2; 16 | SLO; 1; 20 | SLO; 2 Ret | NÜR; 1; 18 | **NÜR**; **2** Ret | SAC; 1; 9 | **SAC**; **2**; 3 | HOC; 1; 15 | HOC; 2; 14 | 22nd | 42 |
| 2015 | C. Abt Racing | Audi R8 LMS ultra | OSC; 1; 8 | OSC; 2; 15 | RBR; 1; 12 | RBR; 2; 13 | SPA; 1; 11 | SPA; 2; 4 | LAU; 1; 11 | LAU; 2; 14 | NÜR; 1; 5 | NÜR; 2 Ret | SAC; 1 Ret | SAC; 2; 9 | ZAN; 1; 5 | ZAN; 2; 3 | HOC; 1; 8 | HOC; 2; 1 | 12th | 87 |

=== Complete FIA World Endurance Championship results ===
| Year | Entrant | Class | Car | Engine | 1 | 2 | 3 | 4 | 5 | 6 | 7 | 8 | 9 | Rank | Points |
|---|---|---|---|---|---|---|---|---|---|---|---|---|---|---|---|
| 2013 | Aston Martin Racing | LMGTE Am | Aston Martin Vantage GTE | Aston Martin 4.5 L V8 | SIL | SPA | LMS | **SÃO**; Ret | COA; 2 | FUJ | **SHA**; Ret | **BHR**; 1 | | 7th | 45 |
| 2014 | Aston Martin Racing | LMGTE Am | Aston Martin Vantage GTE | Aston Martin 4.5 L V8 | SIL; 1 | SPA | LMS; 1 | COA | FUJ; 1 | SHA | **BHR**; 1 | SÃO; 2 | | 3rd | 144 |
| 2015 | Aston Martin Racing | LMGTE Pro | Aston Martin Vantage GTE | Aston Martin 4.5 L V8 | **SIL**; 4 | SPA | LMS; 6 | NÜR | COA | FUJ | SHA | BHR; 4 | | 13th | 41 |
| 2016 | Aston Martin Racing | LMGTE Pro | Aston Martin Vantage GTE | Aston Martin 4.5 L V8 | SIL; 3 | SPA; Ret | LMS; 2 | **NÜR**; 3 | **MEX**; 3 | **COA**; 1 | FUJ; 5 | SHA; 4 | BHR; 1 | 1st | 156 |
| 2017 | Aston Martin Racing | LMGTE Pro | Aston Martin Vantage GTE | Aston Martin 4.5 L V8 | SIL; 6 | SPA; 8 | LMS; 5 | NÜR; 4 | MEX; 1 | COA; 4 | FUJ; 7 | **SHA**; 5 | BHR; 7 | 6th | 104 |
| 2018–19 | Aston Martin Racing | LMGTE Pro | Aston Martin Vantage AMR | Aston Martin 4.0 L Turbo V8 | SPA; 7 | LMS; 5 | SIL; 17 | **FUJ**; 6 | SHA; 1 | SEB; 9 | SPA; 7 | **LMS**; Ret | | 9th | 65.5 |
| 2019–20 | Aston Martin Racing | LMGTE Pro | Aston Martin Vantage AMR | Aston Martin 4.0 L Turbo V8 | SIL; 5 | FUJ; 1 | SHA; 5 | BHR; 1 | **COA**; 1 | SPA; 2 | LMS; 3 | BHR; 5 | | 1st | 172 |
| 2021 | Aston Martin Racing | LMGTE Am | Aston Martin Vantage AMR | Aston Martin 4.0 L Turbo V8 | SPA | ALG | MNZ | LMS; Ret | BHR | BHR | | | | NC | 0 |
| 2022 | Northwest AMR | LMGTE Am | Aston Martin Vantage AMR | Aston Martin 4.0 L Turbo V8 | SEB; 1 | SPA; 3 | LMS; 2 | MNZ; 8 | FUJ; 5 | BHR; 5 | | | | 2nd | 118 |
| 2023 | Northwest AMR | LMGTE Am | Aston Martin Vantage AMR | Aston Martin 4.0 L Turbo V8 | SEB; 11 | ALG; 13 | SPA | LMS | MNZ | FUJ | BHR | | | 29th | 0 |

=== Complete 24 Hours of Le Mans results ===
| Year | Team | Co-Drivers | Car | Class | Laps | Pos. | Class Pos. |
|---|---|---|---|---|---|---|---|
| 2014 | (United Kingdom) Aston Martin Racing | (Denmark) David Heinemeier Hansson (Denmark) Kristian Poulsen | Aston Martin Vantage GTE | GTE; Am | 334 | 17th | **1st** |
| 2015 | (United Kingdom) Aston Martin Racing | (Denmark) Christoffer Nygaard (Denmark) Marco Sørensen | Aston Martin Vantage GTE | GTE; Pro | 330 | 27th | 4th |
| 2016 | (United Kingdom) Aston Martin Racing | (Denmark) Marco Sørensen (United Kingdom) Darren Turner | Aston Martin Vantage GTE | GTE; Pro | 338 | 23rd | 5th |
| 2017 | (United Kingdom) Aston Martin Racing | (Denmark) Marco Sørensen (New Zealand) Richie Stanaway | Aston Martin Vantage GTE | GTE; Pro | 334 | 25th | 9th |
| 2018 | (United Kingdom) Aston Martin Racing | (Denmark) Marco Sørensen (United Kingdom) Darren Turner | Aston Martin Vantage AMR | GTE; Pro | 339 | 23rd | 8th |
| 2019 | (United Kingdom) Aston Martin Racing | (Denmark) Marco Sørensen (United Kingdom) Darren Turner | Aston Martin Vantage AMR | GTE; Pro | 132 | DNF | DNF |
| 2020 | (United Kingdom) Aston Martin Racing | (Denmark) Marco Sørensen (United Kingdom) Richard Westbrook | Aston Martin Vantage AMR | GTE; Pro | 343 | 22nd | **3rd** |
| 2021 | (United Kingdom) Aston Martin Racing | (Brazil) Marcos Gomes (Canada) Paul Dalla Lana | Aston Martin Vantage AMR | GTE; Am | 45 | DNF | DNF |
| 2022 | (Canada) Northwest AMR | (Canada) Paul Dalla Lana (United Kingdom) David Pittard | Aston Martin Vantage AMR | GTE; Am | 342 | 36th | **3rd** |

=== Complete IMSA SportsCar Championship results ===
(key) (Races in bold indicate pole position; races in italics indicate fastest lap)

| Year | Entrant | Class | Make | Engine | 1 | 2 | 3 | 4 | 5 | 6 | 7 | 8 | 9 | 10 | 11 | 12 | Rank | Points | Ref |
|---|---|---|---|---|---|---|---|---|---|---|---|---|---|---|---|---|---|---|---|
| 2014 | NGT Motorsport | GTD | Porsche 911 GT America | Porsche 4.0 L Flat-6 | DAY; 9 | SEB | LGA | DET | WGL | MOS | IND | ELK | VIR | COA | PET | | 70th | 24 | |
| 2020 | Heart of Racing Team | GTD | Aston Martin Vantage AMR GT3 | Aston Martin AMR16A 4.0 L Turbo V8 | DAY; 18 | DAY | SEB | ELK | VIR | ATL | MDO | CLT | PET | LGA | SEB | | 59th | 13 | |
| 2022 | Northwest AMR | GTD | Aston Martin Vantage AMR GT3 | Aston Martin AMR16A 4.0 L Turbo V8 | DAY; 12 | SEB | LBH | LGA | MDO | DET | WGL | MOS | LIM | ELK | VIR | PET | 61st | 211 | |
| 2023 | Magnus Racing | GTD | Aston Martin Vantage AMR GT3 | Aston Martin AMR16A 4.0 L Turbo V8 | DAY; 2 | SEB | LBH | LGA | WGL | MOS | LIM | ELK | VIR | IMS | PET | | 46th | 340 | |
| 2024 | Magnus Racing | GTD | Aston Martin Vantage AMR GT3 Evo | Aston Martin AMR16A 4.0 L Turbo V8 | DAY; 23 | SEB | LBH | LGA | WGL | MOS | ELK | VIR | IMS | PET | | | 75th | 90 | |
| 2025 | Magnus Racing | GTD | Aston Martin Vantage AMR GT3 Evo | Aston Martin AMR16A 4.0 L Turbo V8 | DAY; 21 | SEB | LBH | LGA | WGL | MOS | ELK | VIR | IMS | PET | | | 89th | 119 | |
| 2026 | Magnus Racing | GTD | Aston Martin Vantage AMR GT3 Evo | Aston Martin AMR16A 4.0 L Turbo V8 | DAY; 2 | SEB | LBH | LGA | WGL | MOS | ELK | VIR | IMS | PET | | | 57th | 336 | |

=== Complete GT World Challenge Europe results ===
==== GT World Challenge Europe Endurance Cup ====
| Year | Team | Car | Class | 1 | 2 | 3 | 4 | 5 | 6 | 7 | Pos. | Points |
|---|---|---|---|---|---|---|---|---|---|---|---|---|
| 2015 | Phoenix Racing | Audi R8 LMS Ultra | Pro | MNZ | SIL | LEC | SPA; 6H; 26 | SPA; 12H; 9 | SPA; 24H; 3 | NÜR | 16th | 17 |
| 2018 | R-Motorsport | Aston Martin V12 Vantage GT3 | Pro | MNZ; Ret | **SIL**; 1 | **LEC**; 31 | SPA; 6H; 13 | SPA; 12H; 11 | SPA; 24H; 9 | CAT; 40 | 13th | 29 |
| 2019 | R-Motorsport | Aston Martin Vantage AMR GT3 | Pro | MNZ; 19 | SIL; 40 | LEC | | | | | NC | 0 |
| 2019 | Oman Racing with TF Sport | Aston Martin Vantage AMR GT3 | Pro-Am | | | | SPA; 6H; 26 | SPA; 12H; 20 | SPA; 24H; 22 | CAT | 8th | 49 |
| 2021 | Garage 59 AMR | Aston Martin Vantage AMR GT3 | Pro | MNZ | LEC | SPA; 6H; 15 | SPA; 12H; 3 | SPA; 24H; 3 | NÜR | CAT | 13th | 22 |
| 2022 | Beechdean AMR | Aston Martin Vantage AMR GT3 | Pro | IMO; 12 | LEC; 13 | SPA; 6H; 18 | SPA; 12H; 5 | SPA; 24H; 10 | HOC | CAT | 30th | 6 |
| 2023 | Scherer Sport PHX | Audi R8 LMS Evo II | Pro | MNZ | LEC | SPA; 6H; 2 | SPA; 12H; 12 | SPA; 24H; 3 | NÜR | CAT | 12th | 24 |
| 2024 | Comtoyou Racing | Aston Martin Vantage AMR GT3 Evo | Pro | LEC; 7 | SPA; 6H; 1 | SPA; 12H; 7 | SPA; 24H; 1 | NÜR; 6 | MNZ; 24 | JED; 10 | 4th | 55 |
| 2025 | Comtoyou Racing | Aston Martin Vantage AMR GT3 Evo | Pro | LEC; 5 | MNZ; 3 | SPA; 6H; 6 | SPA; 12H; 62† | SPA; 24H; Ret | NÜR; 7 | CAT; 34 | 8th | 37 |
| 2026 | Comtoyou Racing | Aston Martin Vantage AMR GT3 Evo | Pro | LEC; 1 | MNZ; Ret | SPA; 6H; 11 | SPA; 12H; 22 | SPA; 24H; Ret | **NÜR**; 1 | ALG; Ret | 2nd | 59 |

==== GT World Challenge Europe Sprint Cup ====
| Year | Team | Car | Class | 1 | 2 | 3 | 4 | 5 | 6 | 7 | 8 | 9 | 10 | 11 | 12 | 13 | 14 | Pos. | Points |
|---|---|---|---|---|---|---|---|---|---|---|---|---|---|---|---|---|---|---|---|
| 2015 | Belgian Audi Club Team WRT | Audi R8 LMS ultra | Pro | NOG; QR | NOG; CR | BRH; QR | BRH; CR | ZOL; QR | ZOL; CR | MOS; QR | MOS; CR | ALG; QR | ALG; CR | MIS; QR | MIS; CR | ZAN; QR; 2 | ZAN; CR; 3 | 19th | 21 |
| 2026 | Comtoyou Racing | Aston Martin Vantage AMR GT3 Evo | Pro | BRH; 1; 9 | BRH; 2; 14 | MIS; 1; 16 | MIS; 2 Ret | MAG; 1; 3 | **MAG**; **2**; 18 | ZAN; 1; 9 | ZAN; 2 Ret | CAT; 1; 18 | CAT; 2; 7 | | | | | 19th | 16.5 |

=== Complete European Le Mans Series results ===
| Year | Entrant | Class | Chassis | Engine | 1 | 2 | 3 | 4 | 5 | 6 | Rank | Points |
|---|---|---|---|---|---|---|---|---|---|---|---|---|
| 2017 | TF Sport | LMGTE | Aston Martin Vantage GTE | Aston Martin 4.5 L V8 | **SIL**; 1 | MNZ; 2 | RBR; 3 | LEC; 2 | SPA; 5 | ALG; 3 | 2nd | 102 |
| 2023 | GMB Motorsport | LMGTE | Aston Martin Vantage AMR | Aston Martin 4.0 L Turbo V8 | CAT; Ret | LEC; 12 | ARA; 8 | SPA; Ret | ALG; 8 | ALG; 5 | 17th | 18 |

=== Complete British GT Championship results ===
(key) (Races in bold indicate pole position) (Races in italics indicate fastest lap)

| Year | Team | Car | Class | 1 | 2 | 3 | 4 | 5 | 6 | 7 | 8 | 9 | DC | Points |
|---|---|---|---|---|---|---|---|---|---|---|---|---|---|---|
| 2018 | TF Sport AMR | Aston Martin V12 Vantage GT3 | GT3 | OUL; 1; 11 | OUL; 2; 3 | ROC; 1; 8 | **SNE**; **1**; 1 | **SNE**; **2**; 3 | SIL; 1; 1 | SPA; 1 Ret | BRH; 1; 3 | DON; 1; 2 | 3rd | 148 |
| 2019 | TF Sport | Aston Martin Vantage AMR GT3 | GT3 | OUL; 1; 10 | OUL; 2 Ret | SNE; 1; 8 | **SNE**; **2**; 4 | SIL; 1; 2 | DON; 1; 9 | SPA; 1; 5 | BRH; 1; 7 | DON; 1; 10 | 8th | 72.5 |
| 2023 | Beechdean AMR | Aston Martin Vantage AMR GT3 | GT3 | OUL; 1 | OUL; 2 | SIL; 1 | DON; 1 | SNE; 1 | SNE; 2 | ALG; 1 Ret | BRH; 1 | DON; 1 | NC | 0 |

=== Complete Asian Le Mans Series results ===
(key) (Races in bold indicate pole position) (Races in italics indicate fastest lap)

| Year | Team | Class | Car | Engine | 1 | 2 | 3 | 4 | Pos. | Points |
|---|---|---|---|---|---|---|---|---|---|---|
| 2021 | Phoenix Racing | LMP2 | Oreca 07 | Gibson GK428 4.2 L V8 | DUB; 1; 3 | DUB; 2; 3 | ABU; 1; 4 | ABU; 2; 3 | 4th | 57 |

=== Complete Deutsche Tourenwagen Masters results ===
(key) (Races in bold indicate pole position; races in italics indicate fastest lap)

| Year | Entrant | Chassis | 1 | 2 | 3 | 4 | 5 | 6 | 7 | 8 | 9 | 10 | 11 | 12 | 13 | 14 | 15 | 16 | Rank | Points |
|---|---|---|---|---|---|---|---|---|---|---|---|---|---|---|---|---|---|---|---|---|
| 2022 | T3 Motorsport | Lamborghini Huracán GT3 Evo | ALG; 1; 12 | ALG; 2 Ret | LAU; 1; 13 | LAU; 2 Ret | IMO; 1 | IMO; 2 | NOR; 1 | NOR; 2 | NÜR; 1 | NÜR; 2 | SPA; 1 | SPA; 2 | RBR; 1 | RBR; 2 | HOC; 1 | HOC; 2 | 30th | 0 |
| 2024 | SSR Performance | Lamborghini Huracán GT3 Evo 2 | OSC; 1 Ret | OSC; 2 Ret | LAU; 1; 8 | LAU; 2 Ret | ZAN; 1; 12 | ZAN; 2; 14 | NOR; 1; 4 | **NOR**; **2**; 1^{1} | NÜR; 1; 8 | NÜR; 2 Ret | SAC; 1; 14 | SAC; 2; 10 | RBR; 1; 13 | RBR; 2; 16 | HOC; 1; 10 | HOC; 2; 5^{2} | 13th | 93 |
| 2025 | Abt Sportsline | Lamborghini Huracán GT3 Evo 2 | OSC; 1; 14 | OSC; 2 Ret | LAU; 1; 14 | LAU; 2; 13 | ZAN; 1; 2 | ZAN; 2; 14 | NOR; 1; 20^{2} | NOR; 2 Ret | NÜR; 1; 12 | NÜR; 2; 18 | SAC; 1; 16 | SAC; 2 Ret | RBR; 1; 20 | RBR; 2; 16 | HOC; 1; 8 | HOC; 2; 16 | 18th | 44 |
| 2026 | Comtoyou Racing | Aston Martin Vantage AMR GT3 Evo | RBR; 1; 10 | RBR; 2; 5 | ZAN; 1; 9 | ZAN; 2; 18 | **LAU**; **1**; 4^{1} | LAU; 2; 2^{3} | **NOR**; **1**; 1^{1} | **NOR**; **2**; 1^{1} | OSC; 1; 12 | OSC; 2; 11 | NÜR; 1; 11 | NÜR; 2; 7 | SAC; 1; 8 | SAC; 2 Ret | HOC; 1; 16 | HOC; 2; 14 | 6th | 149 |

Sporting positions
| Preceded by Mark Kamstrup | Danish Formula Ford Championship; Champion; 2006 | Succeeded by Christian Markussen |
| Preceded by Thomas Marschall | SEAT León Supercopa Germany; Champion; 2008 | Succeeded by Thomas Marschall |
| Preceded by René Rast | Porsche Supercup; Champion; 2013 | Succeeded by Earl Bamber |
| Preceded by Richard Lietz | FIA World Endurance Cup for GT Drivers; 2016; With: Marco Sørensen | Succeeded by James Calado; Alessandro Pier Guidi (World Endurance GT Drivers' Championship) |
| Preceded by Michael Christensen; Kévin Estre | World Endurance GT Drivers' Championship; Champion; 2019-20; With: Marco Sørensen | Succeeded by James Calado; Alessandro Pier Guidi |
