= 2015 Blancpain Sprint Series =

Sports car racing championship

Seasons
- ← 2014 2016 →

The 2015 Blancpain Sprint Series was the third season following on from the demise of the SRO Group's FIA GT1 World Championship (an auto racing series for grand tourer cars), the second with the designation of Blancpain Sprint Series.

== Calendar ==
The series started at the Circuit Paul Armagnac in Nogaro, France on 6 April and finished at Circuit Park Zandvoort in Netherlands on 11 October. Baku had been scheduled to host the final round of the season, but was replaced by Zandvoort for economic reasons. The seven-event calendar contained largely the same events as the previous season, with the addition of races at Moscow Raceway in Russia and Misano in Italy.

Event	Circuit	Date
1	Circuit Paul Armagnac, Nogaro, France	6 April
2	(United Kingdom) Brands Hatch, Kent, Great Britain	10 May
3	Circuit Zolder, Heusden-Zolder, Belgium	7 June
4	Moscow Raceway, Volokolamsk, Russia	4 July
5	Algarve International Circuit, Algarve, Portugal	6 September
6	Misano World Circuit Marco Simoncelli, Misano, Italy	4 October
7	Circuit Park Zandvoort, North Holland, Netherlands	11 October

== Entry list ==
Team	Car	No.	Drivers	Class	Rounds
(Brazil) BMW Sports Trophy Team Brasil	BMW Z4 GT3	0	(Brazil) Ricardo Sperafico	P	1
(Brazil) BMW Sports Trophy Team Brasil	BMW Z4 GT3	0	(Brazil) Rodrigo Sperafico	P	1
(Brazil) BMW Sports Trophy Team Brasil	BMW Z4 GT3	0	(Brazil) Cacá Bueno	P	2–7
(Brazil) BMW Sports Trophy Team Brasil	BMW Z4 GT3	0	(Brazil) Sérgio Jimenez	P	2–7
(Brazil) BMW Sports Trophy Team Brasil	BMW Z4 GT3	77	(Belgium) Maxime Martin	P	1
(Brazil) BMW Sports Trophy Team Brasil	BMW Z4 GT3	77	(Germany) Dirk Müller	P	1
(Brazil) BMW Sports Trophy Team Brasil	BMW Z4 GT3	77	(Brazil) Átila Abreu	P	2–7
(Brazil) BMW Sports Trophy Team Brasil	BMW Z4 GT3	77	(Brazil) Valdeno Brito	P	2–7
(Belgium) Belgian Audi Club Team WRT	Audi R8 LMS ultra	1	(Netherlands) Robin Frijns	P	All
(Belgium) Belgian Audi Club Team WRT	Audi R8 LMS ultra	1	(Belgium) Laurens Vanthoor	P	1–6
(Belgium) Belgian Audi Club Team WRT	Audi R8 LMS ultra	1	(Germany) Christopher Mies	P	7
(Belgium) Belgian Audi Club Team WRT	Audi R8 LMS ultra	2	(Germany) Christopher Mies	P	1–6
(Belgium) Belgian Audi Club Team WRT	Audi R8 LMS ultra	2	(Belgium) Enzo Ide	P	1–6
(Belgium) Belgian Audi Club Team WRT	Audi R8 LMS ultra	2	(Denmark) Nicki Thiim	P	7
(Belgium) Belgian Audi Club Team WRT	Audi R8 LMS ultra	2	(Belgium) Frédéric Vervisch	P	7
(Belgium) Belgian Audi Club Team WRT	Audi R8 LMS ultra	3	(Monaco) Stéphane Ortelli	P	All
(Belgium) Belgian Audi Club Team WRT	Audi R8 LMS ultra	3	(Monaco) Stéphane Richelmi	P	All
(Belgium) Belgian Audi Club Team WRT	Audi R8 LMS ultra	4	(United Kingdom) James Nash	P	All
(Belgium) Belgian Audi Club Team WRT	Audi R8 LMS ultra	4	(Germany) Frank Stippler	P	All
(Germany) Phoenix Racing	Audi R8 LMS ultra	6	(Austria) Nikolaus Mayr-Melnhof	P	All
(Germany) Phoenix Racing	Audi R8 LMS ultra	6	(Germany) Markus Winkelhock	P	All
(Austria) Grasser Racing Team	Lamborghini Huracán GT3	19	(Italy) Alberto Di Folco	S	6
(Austria) Grasser Racing Team	Lamborghini Huracán GT3	19	(Netherlands) Jeroen Mul	S	6
(Austria) Grasser Racing Team	Lamborghini Huracán GT3	63	(Italy) Mirko Bortolotti	P	6
(Austria) Grasser Racing Team	Lamborghini Huracán GT3	63	(Finland) Patrick Kujala	P	6
(United Kingdom) Nissan GT Academy Team RJN	Nissan GT-R Nismo GT3	23	(United States) Nick Hammann	PA	4
(United Kingdom) Nissan GT Academy Team RJN	Nissan GT-R Nismo GT3	23	(Russia) Mark Shulzhitskiy	PA	4
(Germany) Attempto Racing	McLaren 650S GT3	54	(Japan) Yoshiharu Mori	PA	1
(Germany) Attempto Racing	McLaren 650S GT3	54	(Germany) Philipp Wlazik	PA	1
(Germany) Attempto Racing	McLaren 650S GT3	54	(Germany) Philipp Wlazik	P	2–3
(Germany) Attempto Racing	McLaren 650S GT3	54	(Switzerland) Fabien Thuner	P	2
(Germany) Attempto Racing	McLaren 650S GT3	54	(France) Nicolas Armindo	P	3
(Germany) Attempto Racing	Porsche 997 GT3-R	54	(Ukraine) Sergey Chukanov	P	4
(Germany) Attempto Racing	Porsche 997 GT3-R	54	(Russia) Ivan Samarin	P	4
(Germany) Attempto Racing	McLaren 650S GT3	55	(United Kingdom) Rob Bell	P	1–4
(Germany) Attempto Racing	McLaren 650S GT3	55	(France) Kévin Estre	P	1–4
(Russia) GT Russian Team	Mercedes-Benz SLS AMG GT3	70	(Russia) Alexey Karachev	PA	All
(Russia) GT Russian Team	Mercedes-Benz SLS AMG GT3	70	(Germany) Bernd Schneider	PA	1–3
(Russia) GT Russian Team	Mercedes-Benz SLS AMG GT3	70	(France) Christophe Bouchut	PA	4–6
(Russia) GT Russian Team	Mercedes-Benz SLS AMG GT3	70	(Netherlands) Indy Dontje	PA	7
(Russia) GT Russian Team	Mercedes-Benz SLS AMG GT3	71	(Russia) Alexey Vasilyev	PA	1–6
(Russia) GT Russian Team	Mercedes-Benz SLS AMG GT3	71	(France) Christophe Bouchut	PA	1
(Russia) GT Russian Team	Mercedes-Benz SLS AMG GT3	71	(Estonia) Marko Asmer	PA	2–6
(Russia) GT Russian Team	Mercedes-Benz SLS AMG GT3	71	(Estonia) Marko Asmer	P	7
(Russia) GT Russian Team	Mercedes-Benz SLS AMG GT3	71	(Russia) Roman Mavlanov	P	7
(Germany) MRS GT-Racing	Nissan GT-R Nismo GT3	73	(United Kingdom) Craig Dolby	P	1–4
(Germany) MRS GT-Racing	Nissan GT-R Nismo GT3	73	(United Kingdom) Sean Walkinshaw	P	1–4
(Czech Republic) ISR	Audi R8 LMS ultra	74	(Denmark) Anders Fjordbach	S	1–3, 6–7
(Czech Republic) ISR	Audi R8 LMS ultra	74	(Denmark) Thomas Fjordbach	S	1–3, 6
(Czech Republic) ISR	Audi R8 LMS ultra	74	(Denmark) Michael Markussen	S	7
(Czech Republic) ISR	Audi R8 LMS ultra	75	(Italy) Marco Bonanomi	P	All
(Czech Republic) ISR	Audi R8 LMS ultra	75	(Czech Republic) Filip Salaquarda	P	All
(Germany) Bentley Team HTP	Bentley Continental GT3	83	(Netherlands) Jules Szymkowiak	S	All
(Germany) Bentley Team HTP	Bentley Continental GT3	83	(France) Olivier Lombard	S	1–2
(Germany) Bentley Team HTP	Bentley Continental GT3	83	(France) Tom Dillmann	S	3
(Germany) Bentley Team HTP	Bentley Continental GT3	83	(Netherlands) Max van Splunteren	S	4–7
(Germany) Bentley Team HTP	Bentley Continental GT3	84	(France) Vincent Abril	P	All
(Germany) Bentley Team HTP	Bentley Continental GT3	84	(Germany) Maximilian Buhk	P	All
(Germany) Reiter Engineering	Lamborghini Gallardo LP 560-4 R-EX	88	(Germany) Albert von Thurn und Taxis	P	All
(Germany) Reiter Engineering	Lamborghini Gallardo LP 560-4 R-EX	88	(Netherlands) Nick Catsburg	P	1–2, 4–7
(Germany) Reiter Engineering	Lamborghini Gallardo LP 560-4 R-EX	88	(Netherlands) Peter Kox	P	3
(United States) Always Evolving Motorsport	Nissan GT-R Nismo GT3	173	(United Kingdom) Craig Dolby	P	5–7
(United States) Always Evolving Motorsport	Nissan GT-R Nismo GT3	173	(United Kingdom) Sean Walkinshaw	P	5–7
(Germany) Rinaldi Racing	Ferrari 458 GT3	333	(Austria) Norbert Siedler	P	All
(Germany) Rinaldi Racing	Ferrari 458 GT3	333	(Germany) Marco Seefried	P	1–6
(Germany) Rinaldi Racing	Ferrari 458 GT3	333	(Netherlands) Jeroen Bleekemolen	P	7
(United Kingdom) Triple 888 Racing	BMW Z4 GT3	888	(United Kingdom) Lee Mowle	PA	2
(United Kingdom) Triple 888 Racing	BMW Z4 GT3	888	(United Kingdom) Joe Osborne	PA	2
(Switzerland) Fach Auto Tech	Porsche 997 GT3-R	911	(Austria) Martin Ragginger	PA	1
(Switzerland) Fach Auto Tech	Porsche 997 GT3-R	911	(Switzerland) Marcel Wagner	PA	1

Icon	Class
P	Pro
PA	Pro-Am Trophy
S	Silver Cup

== Race results ==
Event	Circuit	Pole position	Qualifying Race Winner	Championship Race Winner	Report
1	(France) Nogaro	(Belgium) No. 3 Belgian Audi Club Team WRT	(Belgium) No. 3 Belgian Audi Club Team WRT	(Brazil) No. 77 BMW Sports Trophy Team Brasil	Report
1	(France) Nogaro	(Monaco) Stéphane Ortelli (Monaco) Stéphane Richelmi	(Monaco) Stéphane Ortelli (Monaco) Stéphane Richelmi	(Belgium) Maxime Martin (Germany) Dirk Müller	Report
2	(United Kingdom) Brands Hatch	(Belgium) No. 1 Belgian Audi Club Team WRT	(Belgium) No. 1 Belgian Audi Club Team WRT	(Belgium) No. 1 Belgian Audi Club Team WRT	Report
2	(United Kingdom) Brands Hatch	(Netherlands) Robin Frijns (Belgium) Laurens Vanthoor	(Netherlands) Robin Frijns (Belgium) Laurens Vanthoor	(Netherlands) Robin Frijns (Belgium) Laurens Vanthoor	Report
3	(Belgium) Zolder	(Belgium) No. 1 Belgian Audi Club Team WRT	(Belgium) No. 1 Belgian Audi Club Team WRT	(Belgium) No. 1 Belgian Audi Club Team WRT	Report
3	(Belgium) Zolder	(Netherlands) Robin Frijns (Belgium) Laurens Vanthoor	(Netherlands) Robin Frijns (Belgium) Laurens Vanthoor	(Netherlands) Robin Frijns (Belgium) Laurens Vanthoor	Report
4	(Russia) Moscow	(Germany) No. 88 Reiter Engineering	(Germany) No. 88 Reiter Engineering	(Germany) No. 84 Bentley Team HTP	Report
4	(Russia) Moscow	(Netherlands) Nick Catsburg (Germany) Albert von Thurn und Taxis	(Netherlands) Nick Catsburg (Germany) Albert von Thurn und Taxis	(France) Vincent Abril (Germany) Maximilian Buhk	Report
5	(Portugal) Algarve	(Belgium) No. 2 Belgian Audi Club Team WRT	(Germany) No. 84 Bentley Team HTP	(Belgium) No. 1 Belgian Audi Club Team WRT	Report
5	(Portugal) Algarve	(Belgium) Enzo Ide (Germany) Christopher Mies	(France) Vincent Abril (Germany) Maximilian Buhk	(Netherlands) Robin Frijns (Belgium) Laurens Vanthoor	Report
6	(Italy) Misano	(Germany) No. 333 Rinaldi Racing	(Germany) No. 333 Rinaldi Racing	(Germany) No. 333 Rinaldi Racing	Report
6	(Italy) Misano	(Germany) Marco Seefried (Austria) Norbert Siedler	(Germany) Marco Seefried (Austria) Norbert Siedler	(Germany) Marco Seefried (Austria) Norbert Siedler	Report
7	(Netherlands) Zandvoort	(Germany) No. 84 Bentley Team HTP	(Germany) No. 84 Bentley Team HTP	(Germany) No. 84 Bentley Team HTP	Report
7	(Netherlands) Zandvoort	(France) Vincent Abril (Germany) Maximilian Buhk	(France) Vincent Abril (Germany) Maximilian Buhk	(France) Vincent Abril (Germany) Maximilian Buhk	Report

== Championship standings ==
Scoring system

Championship points were awarded for the first six positions in each Qualifying Race and for the first ten positions in each Championship Race. The pole-sitter in the qualifying race also received one point, entries were required to complete 75% of the winning car's race distance in order to be classified and earn points. Individual drivers were required to participate for a minimum of 25 minutes in order to earn championship points in any race.

Qualifying race points

Position	**1st**	**2nd**	**3rd**	**4th**	**5th**	**6th**	**Pole**
Points	8	6	4	3	2	1	1

Championship race points

Position	**1st**	**2nd**	**3rd**	**4th**	**5th**	**6th**	**7th**	**8th**	**9th**	**10th**
Points	25	18	15	12	10	8	6	4	2	1

=== Drivers' championships ===
==== Cup ====
Pos.	Driver	Team	NOG (France)		BRH (United Kingdom)		ZOL (Belgium)		MSC (Russia)		ALG (Portugal)		MIS (Italy)		ZAN (Netherlands)		Total
Pos.	Driver	Team	QR	CR	QR	CR	QR	CR	QR	CR	QR	CR	QR	CR	QR	CR	Total
1	(France) Vincent Abril (Germany) Maximilian Buhk	(Germany) Bentley Team HTP	8	4	DNS	DNS	3	2	3	1	1	4	7	2	**1**	1	135
2	(Netherlands) Robin Frijns	(Belgium) Belgian Audi Club Team WRT	DNS	DNS	**1**	1	**1**	1	Ret	5	2	1	Ret	DNS	15	2	127
3	(Belgium) Laurens Vanthoor	(Belgium) Belgian Audi Club Team WRT	DNS	DNS	**1**	1	**1**	1	Ret	5	2	1	Ret	DNS			109
4	(Austria) Norbert Siedler	(Germany) Rinaldi Racing	4	5	10	Ret	2	Ret	2	3	4	3	**1**	1	4	DNS	95
5	(Germany) Marco Seefried	(Germany) Rinaldi Racing	4	5	10	Ret	2	Ret	2	3	4	3	**1**	1			92
6	(Monaco) Stéphane Ortelli (Monaco) Stéphane Richelmi	(Belgium) Belgian Audi Club Team WRT	**1**	2	11	7	Ret	10	9	4	15	5	5	7	5	5	76
7	(Brazil) Átila Abreu (Brazil) Valdeno Brito	(Brazil) BMW Sports Trophy Team Brasil			2	2	5	3	7	2	13	13	4	4	9	Ret	74
8	(Germany) Christopher Mies	(Belgium) Belgian Audi Club Team WRT	3	3	9	14	9	Ret	5	7	**10**	7	3	8	15	2	62
9	(Germany) Markus Winkelhock	(Germany) Phoenix Racing	Ret	8	6	8	4	5	10^{1}	6^{1}	3	2	12	12	3	Ret	48
9	(Austria) Nikolaus Mayr-Melnhof	(Germany) Phoenix Racing	Ret	8	6	8	4	5	WD	WD	3	2	12	12	3	Ret	48
10	(Belgium) Enzo Ide	(Belgium) Belgian Audi Club Team WRT	3	3	9	14	9	Ret	5	7	**10**	7	3	8			44
11	(Brazil) Cacá Bueno (Brazil) Sérgio Jimenez	(Brazil) BMW Sports Trophy Team Brasil			4	4	7	4	4	Ret	7	Ret	6	6	8	10	40
12	(Germany) Albert von Thurn und Taxis	(Germany) Reiter Engineering	Ret	17	7	5	11	8	**1**	Ret	5	6	10	9	12	8	39
13	(Netherlands) Nick Catsburg	(Germany) Reiter Engineering	Ret	17	7	5			**1**	Ret	5	6	10	9	12	8	35
14	(Belgium) Maxime Martin (Germany) Dirk Müller	(Brazil) BMW Sports Trophy Team Brasil	**2**	1													31
14	(United Kingdom) Craig Dolby (United Kingdom) Sean Walkinshaw	(Germany) MRS GT-Racing	Ret	15	3	6	6	9	12	11							31
14	(United Kingdom) Craig Dolby (United Kingdom) Sean Walkinshaw	(United States) Always Evolving Motorsport									14	8	9	5	6	Ret	31
15	(Italy) Marco Bonanomi (Czech Republic) Filip Salaquarda	(Czech Republic) ISR	6	7	12	11	10	7	14	Ret	9	11	13	10	11	4	26
16	(United Kingdom) Rob Bell (France) Kévin Estre	(Germany) Attempto Racing	12	13	5	3	Ret	Ret	6	9							22
17	(Italy) Mirko Bortolotti (Finland) Patrick Kujala	(Austria) Grasser Racing Team											2	3			21
17	(Denmark) Nicki Thiim (Belgium) Frédéric Vervisch	(Belgium) Belgian Audi Club Team WRT													2	3	21
18	(Netherlands) Jules Szymkowiak	(Germany) Bentley Team HTP	Ret	14	13	12	8	6	8	10	8	Ret	Ret	DNS	7	6	18
19	(United Kingdom) James Nash (Germany) Frank Stippler	(Belgium) Belgian Audi Club Team WRT	11	6	8	9	Ret	DNS	11	8	6	12	8	13	Ret	Ret	17
20	(Netherlands) Max van Splunteren	(Germany) Bentley Team HTP							8	10	8	Ret	Ret	DNS	7	6	10
21	(France) Tom Dillmann	(Germany) Bentley Team HTP					8	6									8
21	(Estonia) Marko Asmer	(Russia) GT Russian Team			Ret	13	13	DNS	15	13	11	9	15	11	10	7	8
22	(Russia) Alexey Karachev	(Russia) GT Russian Team	5	11	14	10	12	13	13	12	12	10	14	15	13	9	7
23	(Russia) Roman Mavlanov	(Russia) GT Russian Team													10	7	6
24	(Germany) Bernd Schneider	(Russia) GT Russian Team	5	11	14	10	12	13									4
24	(Netherlands) Peter Kox	(Germany) Reiter Engineering					11	8									4
24	(Russia) Alexey Vasilyev	(Russia) GT Russian Team	14	9	Ret	13	13	DNS	15	13	11	9	15	11			4
25	(Netherlands) Jeroen Bleekemolen	(Germany) Rinaldi Racing													4	DNS	3
25	(France) Christophe Bouchut	(Russia) GT Russian Team	14	9					13	12	12	10	14	15			3
26	(Netherlands) Indy Dontje	(Russia) GT Russian Team													13	9	2
	(Denmark) Anders Fjordbach	(Czech Republic) ISR	7	12	16	15	14	12					11	14	14	11	0
	(Denmark) Thomas Fjordbach	(Czech Republic) ISR	7	12	16	15	14	12					11	14			0
	(Austria) Martin Ragginger (Switzerland) Marcel Wagner	(Switzerland) Fach Auto Tech	10	16													0
	(Germany) Philipp Wlazik	(Germany) Attempto Racing	13	18	17	17	15	11									0
	(Denmark) Michael Markussen	(Czech Republic) ISR													14	11	0
	(France) Nicolas Armindo	(Germany) Attempto Racing					15	11									0
	(France) Olivier Lombard	(Germany) Bentley Team HTP	Ret	14	13	12											0
	(Japan) Yoshiharu Mori	(Germany) Attempto Racing	13	18													0
	(United States) Nick Hammann (Russia) Mark Shulzhitskiy	(United Kingdom) Nissan GT Academy Team RJN							Ret	14							0
	(United Kingdom) Lee Mowle (United Kingdom) Joe Osborne	(United Kingdom) Triple 888 Racing			15	16											0
	(Ukraine) Sergey Chukanov (Russia) Ivan Samarin	(Germany) Attempto Racing							DNS	15							0
	(Italy) Alberto Di Folco (Netherlands) Jeroen Mul	(Austria) Grasser Racing Team											16	DNS			0
	(Switzerland) Fabien Thuner	(Germany) Attempto Racing			17	17											0
Guest drivers ineligible for points
	(Brazil) Ricardo Sperafico (Brazil) Rodrigo Sperafico	(Brazil) BMW Sports Trophy Team Brasil	9	10													0

Key
Colour	Result
Gold	Race winner
Silver	2nd place
Bronze	3rd place
Green	Points finish
Blue	Non-points finish
Blue	Non-classified finish (NC)
Purple	Did not finish (Ret)
Black	Disqualified (DSQ)
Black	Excluded (EX)
White	Did not start (DNS)
White	Race cancelled (C)
White	Withdrew (WD)
Blank	Did not participate

**Bold** – Pole
Italics – Fastest Lap

Notes

- ^{1} – Markus Winkelhock was unable to score at Moscow, because he did not share his car with another driver. His regular teammate Nikolaus Mayr-Melnhof had to go home just before the event started.

==== Pro-Am Trophy ====
Pos.	Driver	Team	NOG (France)		BRH (United Kingdom)		ZOL (Belgium)		MSC (Russia)		ALG (Portugal)		MIS (Italy)		ZAN (Netherlands)		Total
Pos.	Driver	Team	QR	CR	QR	CR	QR	CR	QR	CR	QR	CR	QR	CR	QR	CR	Total
1	(Russia) Alexey Karachev	(Russia) GT Russian Team	5	11	14	10	12	13	13	12	12	10	14	15	**13**	9	209
2	(Russia) Alexey Vasilyev	(Russia) GT Russian Team	14	9	Ret	13	**13**	DNS	**15**	13	**11**	9	**15**	11			144
3	(Estonia) Marko Asmer	(Russia) GT Russian Team			Ret	13	**13**	DNS	**15**	13	**11**	9	**15**	11			116
4	(France) Christophe Bouchut	(Russia) GT Russian Team	14	9					13	12	12	10	14	15			111
5	(Germany) Bernd Schneider	(Russia) GT Russian Team	5	11	14	10	12	13									92
6	(Netherlands) Indy Dontje	(Russia) GT Russian Team													**13**	9	34
7	(Austria) Martin Ragginger (Switzerland) Marcel Wagner	(Switzerland) Fach Auto Tech	**10**	16													22
7	(United Kingdom) Lee Mowle (United Kingdom) Joe Osborne	(United Kingdom) Triple 888 Racing			**15**	16											22
8	(Japan) Yoshiharu Mori (Germany) Philipp Wlazik	(Germany) Attempto Racing	13	18													16
9	(United States) Nick Hammann (Russia) Mark Shulzhitskiy	(United Kingdom) Nissan GT Academy Team RJN							Ret	14							15

==== Silver Cup ====
Pos.	Driver	Team	NOG (France)		BRH (United Kingdom)		ZOL (Belgium)		MSC (Russia)		ALG (Portugal)		MIS (Italy)		ZAN (Netherlands)		Total
Pos.	Driver	Team	QR	CR	QR	CR	QR	CR	QR	CR	QR	CR	QR	CR	QR	CR	Total
1	(Netherlands) Jules Szymkowiak	(Germany) Bentley Team HTP	**Ret**	14	**13**	12	**8**	6	**8**	10	**8**	Ret	Ret	DNS	**7**	6	164
2	(Denmark) Anders Fjordbach	(Czech Republic) ISR	7	12	16	15	14	12					11	14	14	11	138
3	(Denmark) Thomas Fjordbach	(Czech Republic) ISR	7	12	16	15	14	12					11	14			114
4	(Netherlands) Max van Splunteren	(Germany) Bentley Team HTP							**8**	10	**8**	Ret	Ret	DNS	**7**	6	77
5	(France) Olivier Lombard	(Germany) Bentley Team HTP	**Ret**	14	**13**	12											53
6	(France) Tom Dillmann	(Germany) Bentley Team HTP					**8**	6									34
7	(Denmark) Michael Markussen	(Czech Republic) ISR													14	11	24
8	(Italy) Alberto Di Folco (Netherlands) Jeroen Mul	(Austria) Grasser Racing Team											**16**	DNS			7

=== Teams' championships ===
==== Cup ====
Pos.	Team	Manufacturer	NOG (France)		BRH (United Kingdom)		ZOL (Belgium)		MSC (Russia)		ALG (Portugal)		MIS (Italy)		ZAN (Netherlands)		Total
Pos.	Team	Manufacturer	QR	CR	QR	CR	QR	CR	QR	CR	QR	CR	QR	CR	QR	CR	Total
1	(Belgium) Belgian Audi Club Team WRT	Audi	**1**	2	**1**	1	**1**	1	5	4	**2**	1	3	7	2	2	177
2	(Germany) Bentley Team HTP	Bentley	8	4	13	12	3	2	3	1	1	4	7	2	**1**	1	143
3	(Brazil) BMW Sports Trophy Team Brasil	BMW	2	1	2	2	5	3	4	2	7	13	4	4	8	10	118
4	(Germany) Rinaldi Racing	Ferrari	4	5	10	Ret	2	Ret	2	3	4	3	**1**	1	4	DNS	98
5	(Germany) Phoenix Racing	Audi	Ret	8	6	8	4	5	10^{1}	6^{1}	3	2	12	12	3	Ret	60
6	(Germany) Reiter Engineering	Lamborghini	Ret	17	7	5	11	8	**1**	Ret	5	6	10	9	12	8	58
7	(Czech Republic) ISR	Audi	6	7	12	11	10	7	14	Ret	9	11	11	10	11	4	50
8	(Russia) GT Russian Team	Mercedes-Benz	5	9	14	10	12	13	13	12	11	9	14	11	10	7	41
9	(Germany) Attempto Racing	McLaren/Porsche	12	13	5	3	15	11	6	9							37
10	(Germany) MRS GT-Racing	Nissan	Ret	15	3	6	6	9	12	11							31
11	(Austria) Grasser Racing Team	Lamborghini											2	3			21
12	(United States) Always Evolving Motorsport	Nissan									14	8	9	5	6	Ret	20
13	(United Kingdom) Nissan GT Academy Team RJN	Nissan							Ret	14							4
14	(Switzerland) Fach Auto Tech	Porsche	10	16													1
15	(United Kingdom) Triple 888 Racing	BMW			15	16											1

Notes

- ^{1} – Phoenix Racing was unable to score at Moscow, because Markus Winkelhock did not share his car with another driver. His regular teammate Nikolaus Mayr-Melnhof had to go home just before the event started.

==== Pro-Am Trophy ====
Pos.	Team	Manufacturer	NOG (France)		BRH (United Kingdom)		ZOL (Belgium)		MSC (Russia)		ALG (Portugal)		MIS (Italy)		ZAN (Netherlands)		Total
Pos.	Team	Manufacturer	QR	CR	QR	CR	QR	CR	QR	CR	QR	CR	QR	CR	QR	CR	Total
1	(Russia) GT Russian Team	Mercedes-Benz	5	9	14	10	**12**	13	**13**	12	**11**	9	**14**	11	**13**	9	236
2	(Switzerland) Fach Auto Tech	Porsche	**10**	16													25
2	(United Kingdom) Triple 888 Racing	BMW			**15**	16											25
3	(Germany) Attempto Racing	McLaren	13	18													19
4	(United Kingdom) Nissan GT Academy Team RJN	Nissan							Ret	14							18

==== Silver Cup ====
Pos.	Team	Manufacturer	NOG (France)		BRH (United Kingdom)		ZOL (Belgium)		MSC (Russia)		ALG (Portugal)		MIS (Italy)		ZAN (Netherlands)		Total
Pos.	Team	Manufacturer	QR	CR	QR	CR	QR	CR	QR	CR	QR	CR	QR	CR	QR	CR	Total
1	(Germany) Bentley Team HTP	Bentley	**Ret**	14	**13**	12	**8**	6	**8**	10	**8**	Ret	Ret	DNS	**7**	6	164
2	(Czech Republic) ISR	Audi	7	12	16	15	14	12					11	14	14	11	138
3	(Austria) Grasser Racing Team	Lamborghini											**16**	DNS			7

== See also ==
- 2015 Blancpain GT Series
- 2015 Blancpain Endurance Series
