= 2015 Blancpain Sprint Series Zandvoort round =

Race details
Date	11 October 2015
Location	Circuit Park Zandvoort, Netherlands
Course	4.307 km (2.676 mi)
- Qualifying Race

Pole
Drivers	(France) Vincent Abril (Germany) Maximilian Buhk	Bentley Team HTP
Time	1:36.485

Fastest Lap
Drivers	(France) Vincent Abril (Germany) Maximilian Buhk	Bentley Team HTP
Time	1:38.937

Podium
First	(France) Vincent Abril (Germany) Maximilian Buhk	Bentley Team HTP
Second	(Denmark) Nicki Thiim (Belgium) Frédéric Vervisch	Belgian Audi Club Team WRT
Third	(Austria) Nikolaus Mayr-Melnhof (Germany) Markus Winkelhock	Phoenix Racing
- Main Race

Pole
Drivers	(France) Vincent Abril (Germany) Maximilian Buhk	Bentley Team HTP

Fastest Lap
Drivers	(Netherlands) Robin Frijns (Germany) Christopher Mies	Belgian Audi Club Team WRT
Time	1:38.053

Podium
First	(France) Vincent Abril (Germany) Maximilian Buhk	Bentley Team HTP
Second	(Netherlands) Robin Frijns (Germany) Christopher Mies	Belgian Audi Club Team WRT
Third	(Denmark) Nicki Thiim (Belgium) Frédéric Vervisch	Belgian Audi Club Team WRT

The 2015 Blancpain Sprint Series Zandvoort round was the last of seven rounds of the 2015 Blancpain Sprint Series season. It took place at Circuit Park Zandvoort in The Netherlands between 9 October and 11 October 2015.

== Report ==
=== Background ===
==== Championship contender Laurens Vanthoor injured ====
Before the season finale, Robin Frijns and Laurens Vanthoor led the championship by eight points, but Vanthoor was not able to try and win the championship together with Frijns as he was injured in a heavy crash in the Qualifying Race at Misano the week before. On the straight before Turn 8 (Quercia) he made contact with the HTP Bentley of Jules Szymkowiak sending the both into the barriers. Both drivers could get out of their cars, but Vanthoor had to be transported to the medical centre to get treatment for a sprained foot. In Zandvoort he was replaced by Christopher Mies.

==== Jeroen Bleekemolen returns ====
Jeroen Bleekemolen returned to the series after an almost one-year absence. He replaced Marco Seefried, because Seefried was not able to race in Zandvoort as he is also a driver for Dempsey Racing-Proton in the FIA WEC and the round at Zandvoort clashed with the 6 Hours of Fuji.

=== Free practice ===
Maximilian Buhk was the quickest driver in the first of two free practice sessions. His fastest lap was a 1:38.084, which was eight tenths faster than championship rival Frijns.

FP2 was dominated by Audi with six cars in the top seven. Debutant Nicki Thiim managed to get the fastest time with a 1:38.205. Frijns was again second, three tenths behind his Danish teammate.

=== Qualifying ===
The No. 84 HTP Bentley of Abril and Buhk was back on top after qualifying and managed to get Pole position for the Qualifying Race. Their championships rivals Frijns, who qualified second, and Norbert Siedler, who qualified fourth, were close behind as the top four was covered by only three tenths of a second. In the second qualifying session Max van Splunteren went off track, which damaged their Bentley. Although he and teammate Szymkowiak were faster than some others, they were still put to the back of the grid, because they were penalized after the crash at Misano involving Szymkowiak and Vanthoor.

=== Warm-Up ===
The championship contending No. 333 Rinaldi Ferrari of Siedler (and Bleekemolen) withdrew from the Main Race after they had suffered an engine failure in the warm-up session. The engine just suddenly lost power causing Siedler to give up his championship hopes.

== Classification ==
=== Qualifying ===
Pos.	Class	No.	Drivers	Team	Manufacturer	Q1	Q2	Q3
1	Pro	84	(France) Vincent Abril (Germany) Maximilian Buhk	(Germany) Bentley Team HTP	Bentley	1:37.707	1:37.216	**1:36.485**
2	Pro	1	(Netherlands) Robin Frijns (Germany) Christopher Mies	(Belgium) Belgian Audi Club Team WRT	Audi	**1:37.669**	1:36.922	1:36.601
3	Pro	2	(Denmark) Nicki Thiim (Belgium) Frédéric Vervisch	(Belgium) Belgian Audi Club Team WRT	Audi	1:39.448	1:37.411	1:36.630
4	Pro	333	(Netherlands) Jeroen Bleekemolen (Austria) Norbert Siedler	(Germany) Rinaldi Racing	Ferrari	1:38.257	**1:36.750**	1:36.777
5	Pro	6	(Austria) Nikolaus Mayr-Melnhof (Germany) Markus Winkelhock	(Germany) Phoenix Racing	Audi	1:45.690	1:37.364	1:36.821
6	Pro	88	(Netherlands) Nick Catsburg (Germany) Albert von Thurn und Taxis	(Germany) Reiter Engineering	Lamborghini	1:42.546	1:37.180	1:37.120
7	Pro	173	(United Kingdom) Craig Dolby (United Kingdom) Sean Walkinshaw	(United States) Always Evolving Motorsport	Nissan	1:39.706	1:37.508	1:37.385
8	Pro	71	(Estonia) Marko Asmer (Russia) Roman Mavlanov	(Russia) GT Russian Team	Mercedes-Benz	1:39.574	1:37.393	1:38.511
9	Pro	3	(Monaco) Stéphane Ortelli (Monaco) Stéphane Richelmi	(Belgium) Belgian Audi Club Team WRT	Audi	1:40.010	1:37.538	
10	Pro-Am	70	(Netherlands) Indy Dontje (Russia) Aleksey Karachev	(Russia) GT Russian Team	Mercedes-Benz	1:39.975	1:37.643	
11	Pro	4	(United Kingdom) James Nash (Germany) Frank Stippler	(Belgium) Belgian Audi Club Team WRT	Audi	1:40.293	1:37.669	
12 (Note: The No. 83 HTP Bentley was penalized after causing a crash in the Qualifying Race at Misano and was put to the back of the grid.)	Silver Cup	83	(Netherlands) Max van Splunteren (Netherlands) Jules Szymkowiak	(Germany) Bentley Team HTP	Bentley	1:37.689	no time	
13	Pro	0	(Brazil) Cacá Bueno (Brazil) Sérgio Jimenez	(Brazil) BMW Sports Trophy Team Brasil	BMW	1:39.387	1:37.911	
14	Pro	77	(Brazil) Átila Abreu (Brazil) Valdeno Brito	(Brazil) BMW Sports Trophy Team Brasil	BMW	1:39.870	1:38.231	
15	Pro	75	(Italy) Marco Bonanomi (Czech Republic) Filip Salaquarda	(Czech Republic) ISR	Audi	1:39.459	1:38.273	
16	Silver Cup	74	(Denmark) Anders Fjordbach (Denmark) Michael Markussen	(Czech Republic) ISR	Audi	1:40.622	no time	

=== Qualifying Race ===
Class winners in bold.

Pos.	Class	No.	Drivers	Team	Manufacturer	Laps	Time/Retired	Pts.
1	**Pro**	**84**	(France) **Vincent Abril** (Germany) **Maximilian Buhk**	(Germany) **Bentley Team HTP**	**Bentley**	**35**		**9** (Note: 8 points for winning QR plus 1 point for Pole (8 + 1 = 9).)
2	Pro	2	(Denmark) Nicki Thiim (Belgium) Frédéric Vervisch	(Belgium) Belgian Audi Club Team WRT	Audi	35	+5.764	**6**
3	Pro	6	(Austria) Nikolaus Mayr-Melnhof (Germany) Markus Winkelhock	(Germany) Phoenix Racing	Audi	35	+16.144	**4**
4	Pro	333	(Netherlands) Jeroen Bleekemolen (Austria) Norbert Siedler	(Germany) Rinaldi Racing	Ferrari	35	+30.919	**3**
5	Pro	3	(Monaco) Stéphane Ortelli (Monaco) Stéphane Richelmi	(Belgium) Belgian Audi Club Team WRT	Audi	35	+31.741	**2**
6	Pro	173	(United Kingdom) Craig Dolby (United Kingdom) Sean Walkinshaw	(United States) Always Evolving Motorsport	Nissan	35	+34.768	**1**
7	**Silver Cup**	**83**	(Netherlands) **Max van Splunteren** (Netherlands) **Jules Szymkowiak**	(Germany) **Bentley Team HTP**	**Bentley**	**35**	**+34.768**	
8	Pro	0	(Brazil) Cacá Bueno (Brazil) Sérgio Jimenez	(Brazil) BMW Sports Trophy Team Brasil	BMW	35	+35.030	
9	Pro	77	(Brazil) Átila Abreu (Brazil) Valdeno Brito	(Brazil) BMW Sports Trophy Team Brasil	BMW	35	+44.836	
10	Pro	71	(Estonia) Marko Asmer (Russia) Roman Mavlanov	(Russia) GT Russian Team	Mercedes-Benz	35	+45.144	
11	Pro	75	(Italy) Marco Bonanomi (Czech Republic) Filip Salaquarda	(Czech Republic) ISR	Audi	35	+46.566	
12	Pro	88	(Netherlands) Nick Catsburg (Germany) Albert von Thurn und Taxis	(Germany) Reiter Engineering	Lamborghini	35	+52.612	
13	**Pro-Am**	**70**	(Netherlands) **Indy Dontje** (Russia) **Aleksey Karachev**	(Russia) **GT Russian Team**	**Mercedes-Benz**	**35**	**+1:13.998**	
14	Silver Cup	74	(Denmark) Anders Fjordbach (Denmark) Michael Markussen	(Czech Republic) ISR	Audi	35	+1:22.070	
15	Pro	1	(Netherlands) Robin Frijns (Germany) Christopher Mies	(Belgium) Belgian Audi Club Team WRT	Audi	34	+1 Lap	
Ret	Pro	4	(United Kingdom) James Nash (Germany) Frank Stippler	(Belgium) Belgian Audi Club Team WRT	Audi	6	Electrical	

=== Main Race ===
Class winners in bold.

Pos.	Class	No.	Drivers	Team	Manufacturer	Laps	Time/Retired	Pts.
1	**Pro**	**84**	(France) **Vincent Abril** (Germany) **Maximilian Buhk**	(Germany) **Bentley Team HTP**	**Bentley**	**36**		25
2	Pro	1	(Netherlands) Robin Frijns (Germany) Christopher Mies	(Belgium) Belgian Audi Club Team WRT	Audi	36	+0.375	18
3	Pro	2	(Denmark) Nicki Thiim (Belgium) Frédéric Vervisch	(Belgium) Belgian Audi Club Team WRT	Audi	36	+0.886	15
4	Pro	75	(Italy) Marco Bonanomi (Czech Republic) Filip Salaquarda	(Czech Republic) ISR	Audi	36	+41.794	12
5	Pro	3	(Monaco) Stéphane Ortelli (Monaco) Stéphane Richelmi	(Belgium) Belgian Audi Club Team WRT	Audi	36	+42.457	10
6	**Silver Cup**	**83**	(Netherlands) **Max van Splunteren** (Netherlands) **Jules Szymkowiak**	(Germany) **Bentley Team HTP**	**Bentley**	**36**	**+42.760**	8
7	Pro	71	(Estonia) Marko Asmer (Russia) Roman Mavlanov	(Russia) GT Russian Team	Mercedes-Benz	36	+55.903	6
8	Pro	88	(Netherlands) Nick Catsburg (Germany) Albert von Thurn und Taxis	(Germany) Reiter Engineering	Lamborghini	36	+56.501	4
9	**Pro-Am**	**70**	(Netherlands) **Indy Dontje** (Russia) **Aleksey Karachev**	(Russia) **GT Russian Team**	**Mercedes-Benz**	**36**	**+1:02.661**	2
10	Pro	0	(Brazil) Cacá Bueno (Brazil) Sérgio Jimenez	(Brazil) BMW Sports Trophy Team Brasil	BMW	36	+1:34.675	1
11	Silver Cup	74	(Denmark) Anders Fjordbach (Denmark) Michael Markussen	(Czech Republic) ISR	Audi	36	+1:36.052	
Ret	Pro	4	(United Kingdom) James Nash (Germany) Frank Stippler	(Belgium) Belgian Audi Club Team WRT	Audi	19	Retired	
Ret	Pro	173	(United Kingdom) Craig Dolby (United Kingdom) Sean Walkinshaw	(United States) Always Evolving Motorsport	Nissan	11	Collision Damage	
Ret	Pro	6	(Austria) Nikolaus Mayr-Melnhof (Germany) Markus Winkelhock	(Germany) Phoenix Racing	Audi	0	Accident	
Ret	Pro	77	(Brazil) Átila Abreu (Brazil) Valdeno Brito	(Brazil) BMW Sports Trophy Team Brasil	BMW	0	Accident	
DNS (Note: The No. 333 Rinaldi Ferrari did not start the race due to an engine failure in the Warm-Up session a couple of hours before the start of the Main Race.)	Pro	333	(Netherlands) Jeroen Bleekemolen (Austria) Norbert Siedler	(Germany) Rinaldi Racing	Ferrari	—	Engine	

=== Standings after the race ===
Drivers' Championship standings

	Pos	Driver	Points
1	1	(France) Vincent Abril (Germany) Maximilian Buhk	135
1	2	(Netherlands) Robin Frijns	127
2	3	(Belgium) Laurens Vanthoor	109
1	4	(Austria) Norbert Siedler	95
2	5	(Germany) Marco Seefried	92

- Note: Only the top five positions are included.

Previous round: 2015 Blancpain Sprint Series Misano round	Blancpain Sprint Series; 2015 season	Next round: TBA
Previous round: 2014 Blancpain Sprint Series Zandvoort round	Blancpain Sprint Series; Zandvoort Round	Next round: None
