= Stéphane Richelmi =

Monegasque racing driver

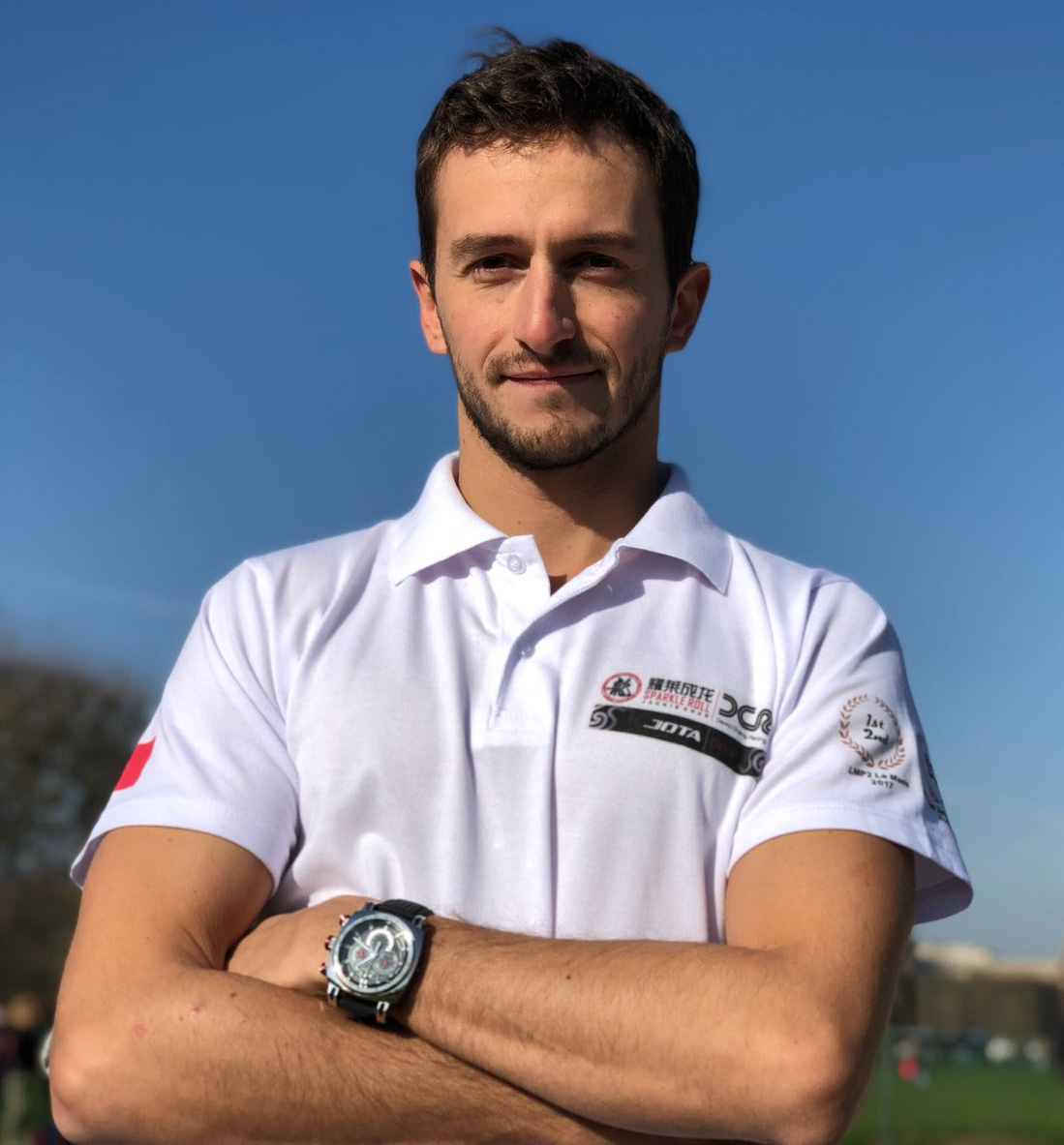
- Stéphane Richelmi in 2018
- Nationality: (Monaco) Monégasque
- Born: 17 March 1990 (age 36) Monte Carlo, Monaco
- Relatives: Jean-Pierre Richelmi (father)

WEC LMP2 career
- Current team: Jackie Chan DC Racing x Jota Sport
- Categorisation: FIA Gold
- Car number: 38

Previous series
- 2011–2014 2010–11 2009–10 2009 2009 2008 2008 2007 2007–08 2006: GP2 Series; Formula Renault 3.5 Series; Italian Formula Three; French GT Championship; British Formula 3 Formula 3 Euro Series; Formula Renault 2.0 WEC; Italian Formula Renault 2.0; Eurocup Formula Renault 2.0; Belgian Formula Renault 1.6

Championship titles
- 2017–18 2016: Asian Le Mans Series; FIA Endurance Trophy for LMP2 Drivers

Stéphane Richelmi (born 17 March 1990 in Monte Carlo) is a Monégasque professional racing driver. He is the son of former World Rally Championship driver Jean-Pierre Richelmi.

== Career ==
=== Formula Renault 1.6 & 2.0 ===
Richelmi began his Formula racing career in the Belgian Formula Renault 1.6 category in 2006, ending the year in 12th place.

The following year, Richelmi stepped up to the Eurocup Formula Renault 2.0 series, racing for Boutsen Energy Racing. He finished the season with no points, with his best race result being an 18th place at the Hungaroring. He also contested two races of the Italian Formula Renault Championship.

In 2008, Richelmi participated in both the Eurocup and Formula Renault 2.0 West European Cup series. He failed to score a point in eight Eurocup races and left the series after failing to qualify for either race at the Le Mans meeting. He finished only 16th in the qualifying race for drivers who failed to make super pole, with the top twelve in the race qualifying for the weekend. In the West European Cup, he scored points in three of his seven races to finish 16th in the championship.

=== Formula Three ===
Richelmi made the step up to Formula Three in late 2008, taking part in the final six races of the Formula 3 Euro Series season with Barazi-Epsilon. His best result was an 18th place on his début in Barcelona.

The following year, Richelmi and the team entered the British Formula 3 Championship, running a Dallara F308 chassis in the International Class. Despite not finishing in the points in any of his 15 races, he was awarded two points at both Spa-Francorchamps and Portimão due to a number of cars finishing ahead of him who were ineligible for championship points. He was classified 19th in the final standings.

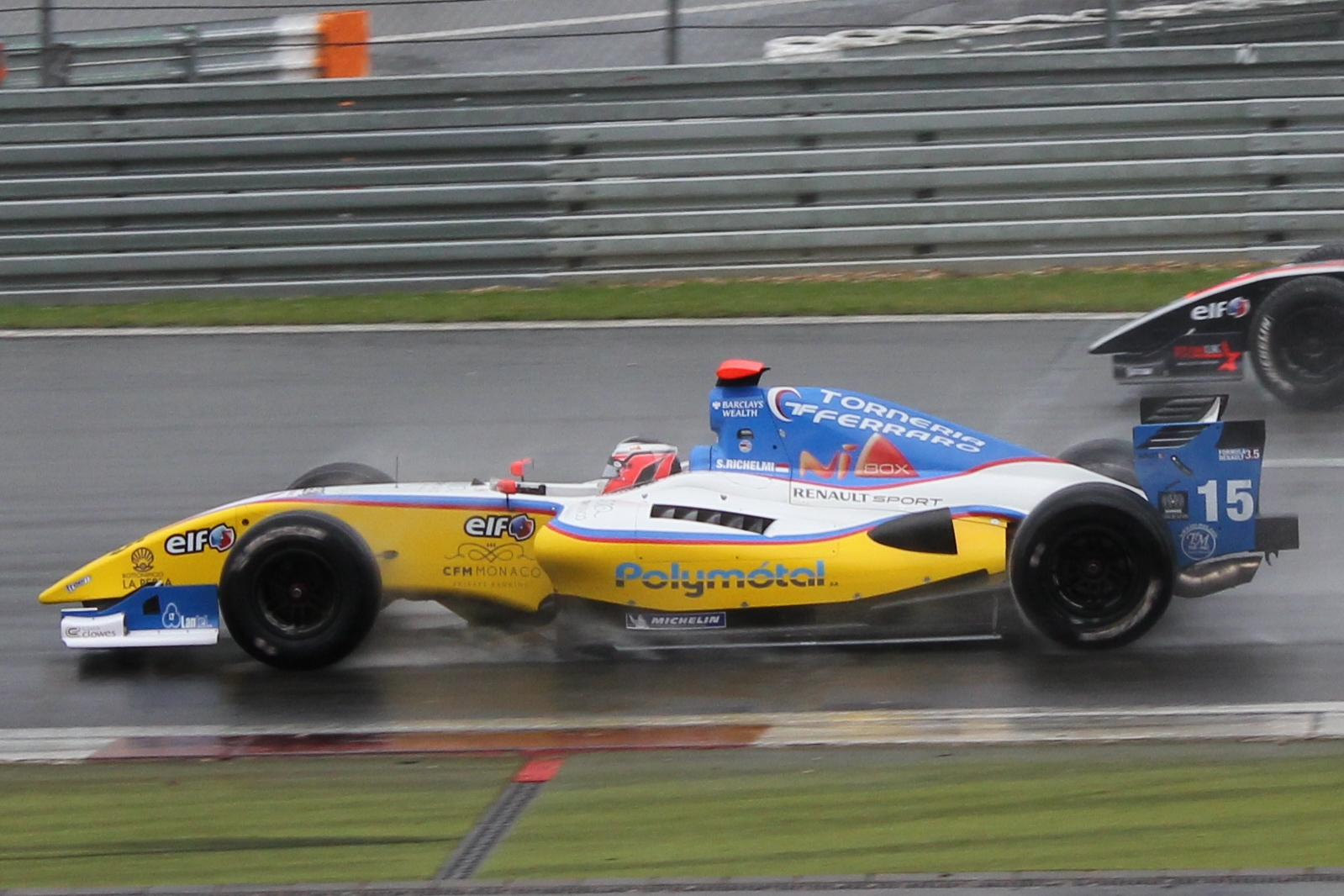
Stéphane Richelmi at the 2011 Nürburgring World series by Renault round

During the year, Richelmi also took part in the Italian Formula Three Championship, driving for RC Motorsport. Despite missing the first two rounds at Adria and Magione, he finished sixth in the standings, scoring podium places at Varano, Imola and Vallelunga. Richelmi continued in the Italian Formula Three series in 2010, switching to the Lucidi Motors team. He finished the season as runner-up behind BVM-Target Racing's César Ramos, taking four race victories and eight podium places in total. Along with Ramos and Andrea Caldarelli, Richelmi tested a Ferrari F2008 Formula One car as a prize for finishing in the top-three in the championship, with the test taking place at Vallelunga on Thursday 2 December. He completed 25 laps during the test and was the slowest of the three runners with a time of 1:17.97.

=== Formula Renault 3.5 Series ===
In October 2009, Richelmi tested a Formula Renault 3.5 Series car for the first time, taking part in the first post-season test session at Motorland Aragón with the recently crowned champions Draco Racing. He completed a total of 80 laps, recording a best time of 1:44.526 on the second day of running. A year later, he tested again for Draco at Barcelona and Motorland Aragón and also had an outing with French team Tech 1 Racing at the latter venue.

It was announced in January 2011 that Richelmi would join the series for the 2011 season, racing for International DracoRacing alongside fellow newcomer André Negrão.

=== Sports cars ===
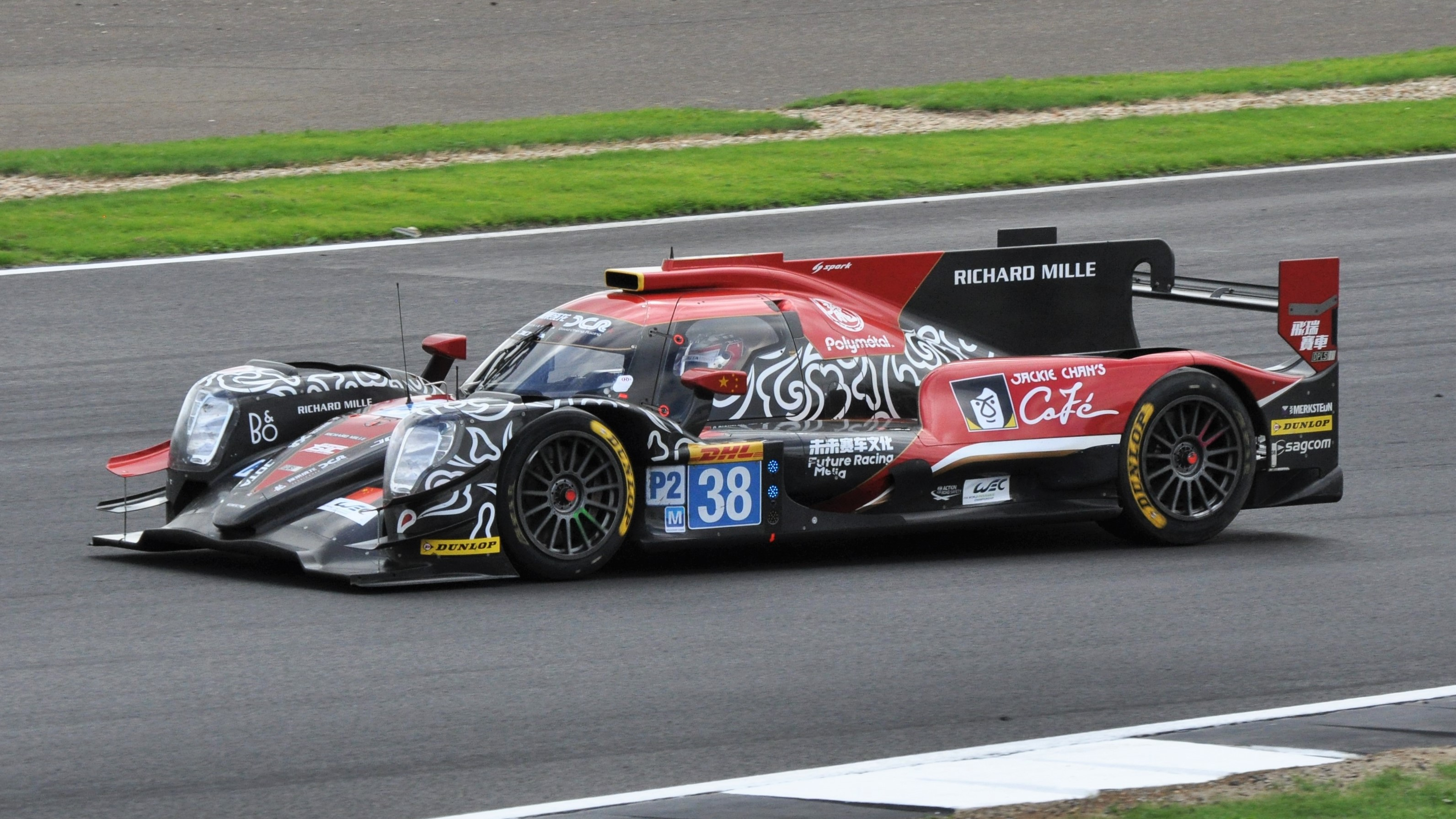
Richelmi driving in the 2018 6 Hours of Silverstone.

In October 2009, Richelmi took part in the French FFSA GT Championship round at Paul Ricard, supporting the FIA GT race held on the same weekend. Sharing a Chevrolet Corvette C6.R with Éric Cayrolle, he finished second in the first race before winning the second event.

=== GP2 Series ===
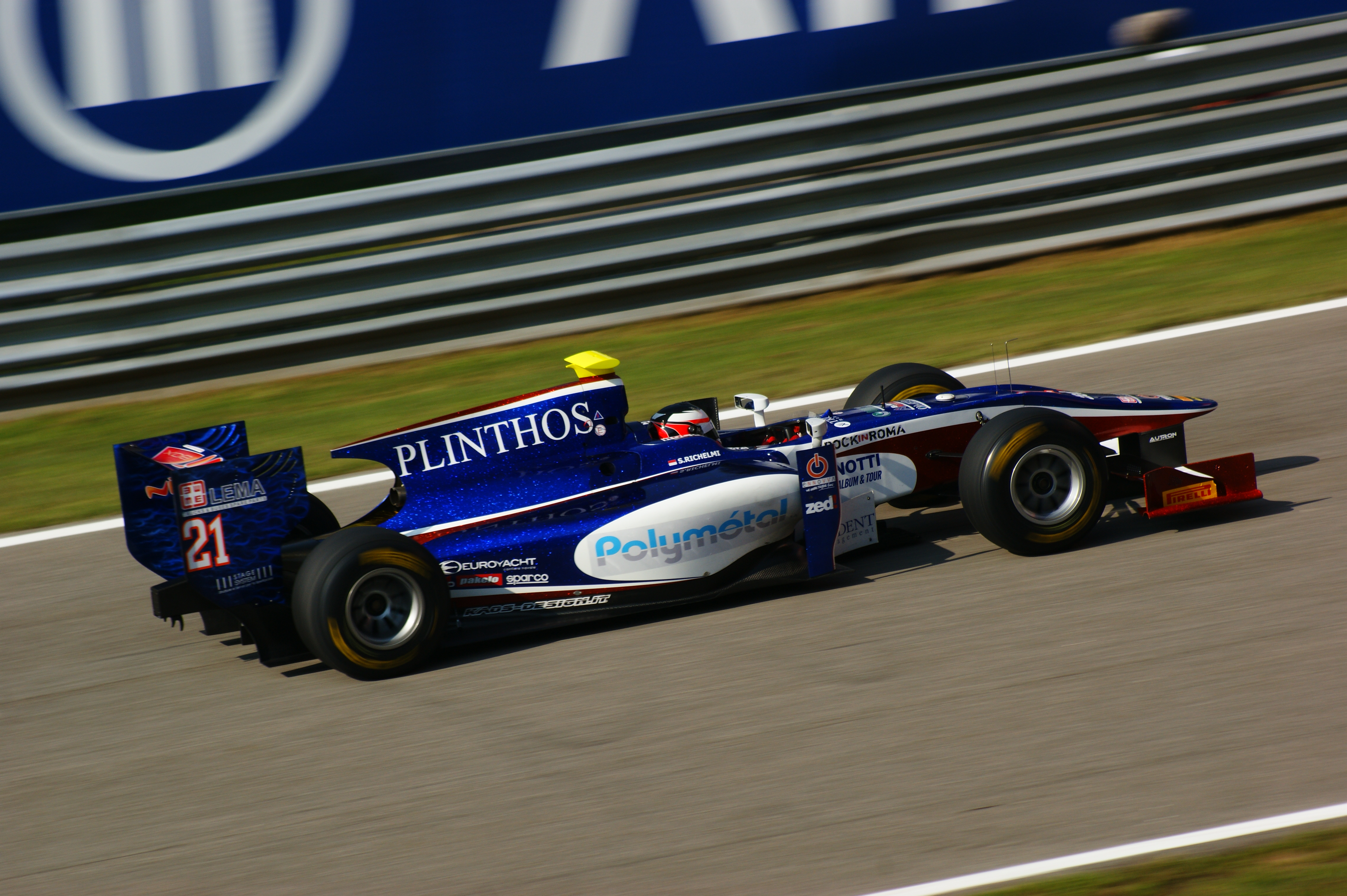
Richelmi driving for Trident at the Monza round of the 2011 GP2 Series season.

Richelmi made his GP2 Series début in the 2011 season finale at Monza, replacing his injured compatriot Stefano Coletti at the Trident Racing team. His team-mate was Rodolfo González. Despite not having tested the car before the event, he finished both races ahead of González. He remained with Trident for the 2012 season, alongside Julián Leal. Taking a best result of third place in the feature race at Hockenheim by gambling successfully on tyre choice in changing weather conditions, he finished 18th in the championship. For 2013, he moved to reigning teams champion DAMS alongside Marcus Ericsson, he managed to score a podium finish at Silverstone and finished eighth in the standings on 103 points.

Richelmi continued with DAMS for the 2014 season, this time with champion of that season Jolyon Palmer. Richelmi scored his maiden GP2 victory in the sprint race at his home event in Monaco and another podium in the sprint race at Italy ensured he finished ninth in the championship on 73 points which helped DAMS take the teams championship.

== Racing record ==
=== Career summary ===
Season	Series	Team	Races	Wins	Poles	F/Laps	Podiums	Points	Position
2006	Belgian Formula Renault 1.6	Thierry Boutsen Racing	12	0	0	?	0	56	12th
2007	Eurocup Formula Renault 2.0	Boutsen Energy Racing	14	0	0	0	0	0	36th
2007	Italian Formula Renault 2.0	Thierry Boutsen Racing	2	0	0	0	0	0	46th
2008	Formula Renault 2.0 WEC	Epsilon Sport	7	0	0	0	0	10	16th
2008	Eurocup Formula Renault 2.0	Epsilon Sport	8	0	0	0	0	0	35th
2008	Formula 3 Euro Series	Barazi-Epsilon	6	0	0	0	0	0	NC†
2009	British Formula 3 Championship	Barazi-Epsilon	15	0	0	0	0	4	19th
2009	Italian Formula 3 Championship	RC Motorsport	12	0	0	0	3	92	6th
2009	French FFSA GT Championship	Selleslagh Racing Team	2	1	1	0	2	0	NC†
2010	Italian Formula 3 Championship	Lucidi Motors	16	4	1	0	8	153	**2nd**
2010	Historic Grand Prix of Monaco - Series G	Ensign Racing	1	0	0	0	0	N/A	16th
2011	Formula Renault 3.5 Series	International DracoRacing	9	0	0	0	0	6	19th
2011	GP2 Series	Trident Racing	2	0	0	0	0	0	31st
2012	GP2 Series	Trident Racing	24	0	0	0	1	25	18th
2013	GP2 Series	DAMS	22	0	0	0	1	103	8th
2014	GP2 Series	DAMS	22	1	1	0	2	73	9th
2014	Blancpain Sprint Series	Belgian Audi Club Team WRT	4	0	1	0	1	18	15th
2015	Blancpain Sprint Series	Belgian Audi Club Team WRT	14	1	1	0	2	76	6th
2015	Blancpain Endurance Series	Belgian Audi Club Team WRT	5	0	0	0	1	15	22nd
2016	FIA World Endurance Championship - LMP2	Signatech-Alpine	9	4	2	0	7	199	**1st**
2016	24 Hours of Le Mans - LMP2	Signatech-Alpine	1	1	0	0	1	N/A	**1st**
2017	Audi R8 LMS Cup	Castrol Racing Team	6	0	0	0	1	25	10th
2017	Blancpain GT Series Endurance Cup	Belgian Audi Club Team WRT	4	0	0	0	0	2	45th
2017	Intercontinental GT Challenge	Team WRT	1	0	0	0	0	0	NC
2017–18	Asian Le Mans Series - LMP2	Jackie Chan DC Racing X Jota	4	3	2	1	4	95	**1st**
2018	24 Hours of Le Mans - LMP2	Jackie Chan DC Racing	1	0	0	0	0	N/A	6th
2018–19	FIA World Endurance Championship - LMP2	Jackie Chan DC Racing	8	3	3	0	6	166	**2nd**
2019	24 Hours of Le Mans - LMP2	Jackie Chan DC Racing	1	0	0	0	1	N/A	**2nd**
2021	GT World Challenge Europe Sprint Cup	CMR	10	0	0	0	0	3	29th
2021	Le Mans Cup - Innovative	H24 Racing	2	N/A					NC
2022	Le Mans Cup - LMP3	H24 Racing	4	0	0	0	0	0	33rd
2024	European Le Mans Series - LMP2	Vector Sport	6	0	0	0	1	21	14th
2024	24 Hours of Le Mans - LMP2	Vector Sport	1	0	0	0	0	N/A	5th

^{†} As Richelmi was a guest driver, he was ineligible for championship points.

=== Complete Eurocup Formula Renault 2.0 results ===
(key) (Races in bold indicate pole position; races in italics indicate fastest lap)

Year	Entrant	1	2	3	4	5	6	7	8	9	10	11	12	13	14	DC	Points
2007	Boutsen Energy Racing	ZOL; 1; 20	ZOL; 2; 21	NÜR; 1; 28	NÜR; 2; 20	HUN; 1; 26	HUN; 2; 18	DON; 1 Ret	DON; 2 Ret	MAG; 1 Ret	MAG; 2 Ret	EST; 1; 25	EST; 2 Ret	CAT; 1; 24	CAT; 2; 23	36th	0
2008	Epsilon Sport	SPA; 1; 17	SPA; 2; 13	SIL; 1; 39†	SIL; 2; 15	HUN; 1 Ret	HUN; 2; 15	NÜR; 1; 34†	NÜR; 2; 23	LMS; 1 DNQ	LMS; 2 DNQ	EST; 1	EST; 2	CAT; 1	CAT; 2	35th	0

=== Complete Formula 3 Euro Series results ===
key) (Races in bold indicate pole position) (Races in italics indicate fastest lap)

Year	Entrant	Chassis	Engine	1	2	3	4	5	6	7	8	9	10	11	12	13	14	15	16	17	18	19	20	DC	Points
2008	Barazi-Epsilon	Dallara F308/094	Mercedes	HOC; 1	HOC; 2	MUG; 1	MUG; 2	PAU; 1	PAU; 2	NOR; 1	NOR; 2	ZAN; 1	ZAN; 2	NÜR; 1	NÜR; 2	BRH; 1	BRH; 2	CAT; 1; 18	CAT; 2 Ret	BUG; 1; 25	BUG; 2; 23	HOC; 1; 21	HOC; 2; 21†	NC‡	0‡

† Driver did not finish the race, but was classified as he completed over 90% of the race distance.
‡ As Richelmi was a guest driver, he was ineligible for championship points.

=== Complete Formula Renault 3.5 Series results ===
(key) (Races in bold indicate pole position) (Races in italics indicate fastest lap)

Year	Team	1	2	3	4	5	6	7	8	9	10	11	12	13	14	15	16	17	Pos	Points
2011	International Draco Racing	ALC; 1; 16	ALC; 2 Ret	SPA; 1; 17	SPA; 2 Ret	MNZ; 1; 7	MNZ; 2; 15	MON; 1; 16	NÜR; 1; 13	NÜR; 2; 13	HUN; 1; 15	HUN; 2; 20	SIL; 1; 19	SIL; 2; 20	LEC; 1; 17	LEC; 2; 13	CAT; 1 Ret	CAT; 2 Ret	26th	6

=== Complete GP2 Series results ===
(key) (Races in bold indicate pole position) (Races in italics indicate fastest lap)

Year	Entrant	1	2	3	4	5	6	7	8	9	10	11	12	13	14	15	16	17	18	19	20	21	22	23	24	DC	Points
2011	Trident Racing	IST; FEA	IST; SPR	CAT; FEA	CAT; SPR	MON; FEA	MON; SPR	VAL; FEA	VAL; SPR	SIL; FEA	SIL; SPR	NÜR; FEA	NÜR; SPR	HUN; FEA	HUN; SPR	SPA; FEA	SPA; SPR	MNZ; FEA; 15	MNZ; SPR; 14							31st	0
2012	Trident Racing	SEP; FEA; 19	SEP; SPR; 19	BHR1; FEA; 11	BHR1; SPR; Ret	BHR2; FEA; 17	BHR2; SPR; 17	CAT; FEA; 21	CAT; SPR; 19	MON; FEA; 8	MON; SPR; Ret	VAL; FEA; 14	VAL; SPR; Ret	SIL; FEA; 13	SIL; SPR; Ret	HOC; FEA; 3	HOC; SPR; 21	HUN; FEA; 17	HUN; SPR; 21	SPA; FEA; 9	SPA; SPR; 6	MNZ; FEA; 13	MNZ; SPR; 9	MRN; FEA; 14	MRN; SPR; 22†	18th	25
2013	DAMS	SEP; FEA; 8	SEP; SPR; 4	BHR; FEA; Ret	BHR; SPR; 13	CAT; FEA; 15	CAT; SPR; 15	MON; FEA; 9	MON; SPR; 8	SIL; FEA; 2	SIL; SPR; 19	**NÜR**; **FEA**; 5	NÜR; SPR; Ret	HUN; FEA; 5	HUN; SPR; 9	SPA; FEA; 7	SPA; SPR; 4	MNZ; FEA; 4	MNZ; SPR; 25	MRN; FEA; 4	MRN; SPR; 4	YMC; FEA; Ret	YMC; SPR; 20			8th	103
2014	DAMS	BHR; FEA; 19	BHR; SPR; 5	**CAT**; **FEA**; 10	CAT; SPR; 7	MON; FEA; 8	MON; SPR; 1	RBR; FEA; 14	RBR; SPR; 10	SIL; FEA; 8	SIL; SPR; 6	HOC; FEA; 10	HOC; SPR; Ret	HUN; FEA; Ret	HUN; SPR; 11	SPA; FEA; 21	SPA; SPR; 12	MNZ; FEA; 4	MNZ; SPR; 3	SOC; FEA; 22	SOC; SPR; 18	YMC; FEA; 5	YMC; SPR; 9			9th	73

† Driver did not finish the race, but was classified as he completed over 90% of the race distance.

==== Complete GP2 Final results ====
(key) (Races in bold indicate pole position) (Races in italics indicate fastest lap)

Year	Entrant	1	2	DC	Points
2011	Trident Racing	YMC; FEA; 19	YMC; SPR; 18	26th	0

=== Complete GT World Challenge Europe Sprint Cup results ===
Year	Team	Car	Class	1	2	3	4	5	6	7	8	9	10	11	12	13	14	Pos.	Points
2014	Belgian Audi Club Team WRT	Audi R8 LMS ultra	Pro	NOG; QR	NOG; CR	BRH; QR	BRH; CR	ZAN; QR	ZAN; CR	SVK; QR	SVK; CR	ALG; QR	ALG; CR	ZOL; QR; 23	ZOL; CR; 10	**BAK**; **QR**; 3	BAK; CR; 4	15th	18
2015	Belgian Audi Club Team WRT	Audi R8 LMS ultra	Pro	**NOG**; **QR**; 1	NOG; CR; 2	BRH; QR; 11	BRH; CR; 7	ZOL; QR; Ret	ZOL; CR; 10	MOS; QR; 9	MOS; CR; 4	ALG; QR; 15	ALG; CR; 5	MIS; QR; 5	MIS; CR; 7	ZAN; QR; 5	ZAN; CR; 5	6th	76
2021	CMR	Bentley Continental GT3	Pro	MAG; 1; 14	MAG; 2; 15	ZAN; 1; 20	ZAN; 2; 14	MIS; 1; 17	MIS; 2; 20	BRH; 1; 20	BRH; 2; 23	VAL; 1; 7	VAL; 2 Ret					29th	3

=== Complete FIA World Endurance Championship results ===
Year	Entrant	Class	Car	Engine	1	2	3	4	5	6	7	8	9	Rank	Points
2016	Signatech Alpine	LMP2	Alpine A460	Nissan VK45DE 4.5 L V8	SIL; 4	SPA; 1	LMS; 1	NÜR; 1	MEX; 2	**COA**; 1	FUJ; 3	SHA; 4	**BHR**; 3	1st	199
2018–19	Jackie Chan DC Racing	LMP2	Oreca 07	Gibson GK428 4.2 L V8	SPA; 1	LMS; 4	SIL; 1	FUJ; 2	**SHA**; 1	**SEB**; 6	**SPA**; 3	LMS; 2		2nd	166

=== 24 Hours of Le Mans results ===
Year	Team	Co-Drivers	Car	Class	Laps	Pos.	Class Pos.
2016	(France) Signatech Alpine	(France) Nicolas Lapierre (United States) Gustavo Menezes	Alpine A460-Nissan	LMP2	357	5th	**1st**
2018	(China) Jackie Chan DC Racing	(China) Ho-Pin Tung (France) Gabriel Aubry	Oreca 07-Gibson	LMP2	356	10th	6th
2019	(China) Jackie Chan DC Racing	(China) Ho-Pin Tung (France) Gabriel Aubry	Oreca 07-Gibson	LMP2	367	7th	**2nd**
2024	(United Kingdom) Vector Sport	(Republic of Ireland) Ryan Cullen (France) Patrick Pilet	Oreca 07-Gibson	LMP2	297	19th	5th

=== Complete European Le Mans Series results ===
Year	Entrant	Class	Chassis	Engine	1	2	3	4	5	6	Rank	Points
2024	Vector Sport	LMP2	Oreca 07	Gibson GK428 4.2 L V8	CAT; 10	LEC; 10	IMO; 3	SPA; 8	MUG; 12	ALG; Ret	14th	21

Sporting positions
Preceded by Sam Bird; Julien Canal; Roman Rusinov	FIA Endurance Trophy for LMP2 Drivers; 2016; With: Nicolas Lapierre & Gustavo Menezes	Succeeded by Bruno Senna; Julien Canal
Preceded by Andrea Roda	Asian Le Mans Series; LMP2 Champion; 2017–18; With: Harrison Newey & Thomas Laurent	Succeeded by Paul di Resta; Phil Hanson
