= 2010 Dubai 24 Hour =

Motorsports endurance race

Seasons
- ← 2009 2011 →

The layout of the Dubai Autodrome.

The 2010 TOYO Tires Dubai 24 Hour was the fifth running of the Dubai 24 Hour endurance race. The race was held at the Dubai Autodrome and was organized by the promoter Creventic. The official event commenced on 14 January and finished on 16 January 2010.

The race was won by the A6 class IMSA Performance Matmut team, with Raymond Narac, Patrick Pilet and Marco Holzer piloting the team's Porsche 997 GT3 RSR to a race record distance, covering 608 laps over the 24 Hours. The podium was completed by a pair of A5 class BMW Z4 M-Coupés; the Petronas Syntium Team of Nobuteru Taniguchi, Masataka Yanagida, Fariqe Hairuman, Johannes Stuck and Hiroki Yoshida finished second, behind Narac, Pilet and Holzer, and the Al Faisal Racing team finished third, two laps behind the Petronas team, with a driving quartet of Abdulaziz and Khaled Al Faisal, Marko Hartung and Claudia Hürtgen. Other classes were won by BMW Team Hungary with Efficient Dynamics (11th overall, D2 class), Team Black Falcon (12th, SP2 class, and 31st, A4 class), Bovi Motorsport (13th, SP1 class), AUH Motorsports (16th, SP3 class), SUNRED Racing Team (20th, A3T class), Team Sally Racing (30th, A2 class), and Marcos Racing International (34th, D1 class).

== Overview ==
Practice day for the participants was on 13 January and was split into two segments. The first segment was held at 11:30 a.m. and concluded at 12:30 a.m., giving the entrants 1 hour to prepare for the Qualifying Session. The other segment of practice was held started at 1:25 p.m. and concluded at 2:50 p.m. allowing the entrants another 1 hour 25 minutes to prepare their cars for the Qualifying Session. The Qualifying session was held on the same day as practice and commenced at 3:30 p.m. and concluded at 5:00 p.m.

The race itself commenced on 15 January at exactly 2:00 p.m. with the weather being Sunny and warm. A total of 75 vehicles made up the grid for the 2010 Dubai 24 Hour which was down from last years number of 78 vehicles. Nonetheless, the Endurance Event lasted for the full 24 Hours and as such finished at 2:00 p.m. on 16 January.

== Qualifying ==
The Qualifying Session for the 2010 Dubai 24 Hour commenced on 13 January at 3:30 p.m. with the session lasting for 1 hour 30 minutes, concluding at 5:00 p.m. Unlike the previous edition of the race in which the Top Ten was dominated by different variants of Porsche 911s, this year saw a mixture of 911s, a Mosler MT900, a number of BMW Z4 Coupes and a GT3-spec Ascari KZ1-R GT. However, Pole position was once again occupied by a Porsche entered by the IMSA Performance Matmut crew with a blistering time of 2:02.701.

Rank	No.	Class	Team	Car	Lap Time	Gap
1	66	A6	IMSA Performance Matmut	Porsche 997 GT3 RSR	2:02.701	
2	147	SP2	Gravity Racing International	Mosler MT900R GT3	2:03.536	+0.835
3	8	A6	De Lorenzi Racing	Porsche 997 GT3 Cup S	2:04.006	+1.305
4	65	A6	IMSA Performance Matmut	Porsche 997 GT3 RSR	2:05.179	+2.478
5	155	SP2	Rhino's Leipert Motorsport	Ascari KZ1-R GT3	2:05.627	+2.926
6	2	A5	Al Faisal Racing	BMW Z4 M-Coupé	2:06.009	+3.308
7	31	A6	Land Motorsport	Porsche 997 GT3 Cup	2:06.189	+3.488
8	41	A5	Petronas Syntium Team	BMW Z4 M-Coupé	2:06.533	+3.832
9	40	A5	Petronas Syntium Team	BMW Z4 M-Coupé	2:06.783	+4.082
10	148	SP2	AF Corse	Ferrari F430 GT2	2:07.241	+4.540
11	3	A6	Besaplast Racing Team	Porsche 997 GT3 Cup	2:07.622	+4.921
12	1	A6	Land Motorsport	Porsche 997 GT3 Cup	2:07.786	+5.085
13	4	A6	Auto Racing Club Bratislava	Porsche 911 GT3	2:07.815	+5.114
14	7	SP2	First Motorsport	Ferrari F430 GT3	2:07.843	+5.142
15	146	SP2	Craft Racing	Ginetta G50Z GT3	2:08.365	+5.494
16	5	A6	Team Need For Speed	Porsche 997 Supercup	2:08.365	+5.664
17	6	A6	Jetalliance Racing	Porsche 997 Cup	2:09.723	+6.022
18	24	SP2	H&P Incentives	BMW 140 GTR	2:08.754	+6.053
19	44	SP2	Mal Rose Racing	Holden Commodore SS	2:08.945	+6.244
20	46	SP2	VDS Racing Adventures	Ford Mustang FR500	2:09.034	+6.333
21	25	A6	Hermes Attempto Racing Gmbh	Porsche 997 Cup	2:09.300	+6.599
22	10	A6	CC Car Collection	Porsche 997 GT3 Cup	2:09.700	+6.999
23	168	SP1	Bovi Motorsport	Brokernet Silver Sting	2:09.794	+7.093
24	16	A6	Lukas Motorsport	Porsche 997 GT3 Cup	2:10.107	+7.406
25	11	A6	CC Car Collection	Porsche 997 GT3 Cup	2:10.282	+7.581
26	9	A6	De Lorenzi Racing	Porsche 997 GT3 Cup	2:10.560	+7.859
27	18	A6	Tzunami Rally Team	Porsche 997 GT3 Cup	2:11.567	+8.866
28	74	A3T	SUNRED Racing Team	SEAT Leon Super Copa	2:12.448	+9.747
29	124	SP3	Nicholas Mee Racing	Aston Martin V8 Vantage GT4	2:13.482	+10.930
30	128	SP3	Gentle Swiss Racing	Aston Martin V8 Vantage N24	2:14.482	+11.781
31	78	A3T	SUNRED Racing Team	SEAT Leon Super Copa TFS	2:15.030	+12.329
32	122	SP3	AUH Motorsports	Aston Martin V8 Vantage GT4	2:15.174	+12.473
33	171	SP1	Gomez Competition	Solution F-Touring Cup	2:15.348	+12.647
34	123	SP3	Donkervoort Racing	Donkervoort D8 GT	2:15.672	+12.971
35	121	SP3	AUH Motorsports	Aston Martin V8 Vantage GT4	2:15.719	+13.018
36	154	SP3	Speedlover	Aston Martin V8 Vantage N24	2:16.611	+13.910
37	71	A3T	Strategic Transport Racing	SEAT Leon Super Copa	2:16.627	+13.926
38	33	D2	BMW Team Hungary with Efficient Dynamics	BMW 120d	2:16.882	+14.181
39	17	A6	Track Torque Racing	Ginetta G50	2:17.108	+14.407
40	45	A5	Povey Motorsport with Pontoon Hire	BMW M3	2:17.183	+14.482
41	129	SP3	DXB Racing	Aston Martin V8 Vantage GT4	2:18.197	+15.496
42	70	SP3	RED Motorsport	Lotus Exige GT4	2:18.364	+15.663
43	72	A3T	Strategic Transport Racing	SEAT Leon Super Copa	2:18.688	+15.987
44	73	A3T	Zengő Dubai Team Motorsport	SEAT Leon Super Copa	2:18.768	+16.067
45	125	SP3	Nicholas Mee Racing	Aston Martin V8 Vantage GT4	2:19.277	+16.576
46	76	A3T	Zengő Motorsport KTF	SEAT Leon Super Copa	2:19.311	+16.610
47	120	SP3	Brunswick Automotive	Aston Martin V8 Vantage	2:19.642	+16.941
48	77	A3T	WRC Developments	Mitsubishi Lancer Evo X	2:19.676	+16.975
49	75	A3T	Tschornia Motorsport	VW Golf R-Line	2:20.023	+17.332
50	145	SP2	GRC Racing	Aston Martin V8 Vantage N24	2:20.606	+17.905
51	170	SP1	Gomez Competition	Solution F-Touring Cup	2:20.620	+17.919
52	172	SP2	Red Camel Racing	Saker Sportscar GT TDI	2:21.117	+18.416
53	61	A4	K&K Racing Team	BMW 130i	2:23.298	+20.597
54	88	A4	Team Black Falcon	BMW Z4 Coupe SI	2:23.393	+20.692
55	165	A4	Team 930 Rush	Porsche 964 Carrera	2:23.493	+20.792
56	86	A2	Boutsen Energy Racing	Renault Clio Cup	2:24.738	+22.037
57	19	D2	Nooren Autosport	BMW 120d	2:24.971	+22.270
58	110	D1	Volkswagen Motorsport Austria	VW Scirocco TDI	2:25.521	+22.820
59	94	A2	Team First	Renault Clio Cup	2:25.521	+22.909
60	95	A2	Team First	Renault Clio Cup	2:26.137	+23.436
61	90	A2	Duel Racing	Renault Clio Cup	2:26.202	+23.501
62	87	A2	Boutsen Energy Racing	Renault Clio Cup	2:26.644	+23.943
63	89	A2	Team Sally Racing	Renault Clio Cup	2:26.808	+24.107
64	42	A5	Jaco's Paddock Limited Motorsport	BMW M3	2:26.906	+24.205
65	85	A2	Team Premier	Renault Clio Cup	2:28.192	+25.491
66	108	D1	Red Camel Racing	SEAT Leon TDI	2:28.641	+25.940
67	57	A2	LAP57 Racing Team	Honda Civic Type R	2:28.939	+26.235
68	112	D1	Marcos Racing International	BMW 120d	2:29.350	+26.649
69	62	A4	Duwo Racing	BMW 130i Challenge	2:30.418	+27.717
70	116	D1	Marcos Racing International	BMW 120d	2.30.920	+28.219
71	117	D1	Marcos Racing International	BMW 120d	2:39.747	+37.046
72	99	SP2	Besaplast Racing Dolate Motorsport	BMW M3	No Time	No Time
73	111	SP2	Team Black Falcon	BMW M3	No Time	No Time
74	22	SP3	Al Faisal Racing	BMW M3 GT4	No Time	No Time
75	105	D1	Certainly Racing Team	BMW 120d	No Time	No Time

== Race ==
The first eight hours saw a lot of action that involved some of the possible contenders for a podium finish. Among the early retirements were the Auto Racing Club Bratislava-Porsche (Miroslav Konopka-Oliver Morley-Sean Edwards-Richard Cvörnjek) and the Besaplast Racing Team-Porsche (Franjo Kovac-Martin Tschornia-Kurt Thiim-Roland Asch-Sebastian Asch). The latter team that finished third in last year's race was out of contention after their car caught fire on the main straight with Martin Tschornia behind the wheel, seven and a half hours into the race. The unfortunate driver escaped unscathed, but the car was damaged beyond immediate repair.

Last year's winners, the No.1 Land Motorsport-Porsche (Gabriel Abergel-Xavier Pompidou-Carsten Tilke-Otto Klohs) were sidelined as well after Tilke had over-revved the engine. Almost at the same time, the number 148-AF Corse Ferrari (Robert Kaufmann-Michael Waltrip-Marcos Ambrose-Rui Águas-Niki Cadei) became involved in a collision with the car of NASCAR-star Michael Waltrip, who was in his first-ever 24-hour race in Dubai. Michael Waltrip couldn't avoid the collision when the other car started swerving in front of him. The Ferrari F430 also incurred considerable damage and retired. Up to the time of the accident, the car had always been in the top ten, running as high as sixth.

In the opening half of the race, the pace was set by the two IMSA Performance Matmut-Porsches and the BMWs of the Petronas Syntium Team and Al Faisal Racing. However, the IMSA Performance Matmut team No.65's hopes were dealt a severe blow when the clutch had to be replaced on the car in the twelfth hour of the race. Later on, the car retired due to gearbox failure.

In the end, the No.66 IMSA Performance Matmut team-Porsche 997 GT3-RSR was able to match its blistering Pole position performance with a solid final hour in the race to pen up a 2 Lap lead over the 2nd placed Petronas Syntium Team-BMW Z4 Coupe and take the victory. Though the Z4 Coupe GT was lapping faster in the final 20 minutes, the Porsche's reliability kept a solid gap between the two vehicles allowing for Porsche to win their third-straight Dubai 24 Hour.

The Japanese Petronas Synthium team also raced in Dubai for the first time. They had their pair of BMW Z4s in the top five for most of the race, but the second car (Tatsuya Kataoka-Manabu Orido-Johan Adzmi-Kosuke Matsuura-Hiroki Yoshida) retired with half an hour remaining. A good performance was shown by the BMW Team Hungary with Efficient Dynamics. The BMW 120D driven by Lázlò Palik-János Vida-Csaba Walter-Gábor Weber finished eleventh overall out of the 75 participating cars, winning the D2-class for diesel-powered cars. The Hungarian Brokernet Silversting sportscar was also successful, winning the SP1 category with Kalman Bodis-Attila Barta-Istvàn Ràcz-Wolfgang Kaufmann driving for the Bovi Motorsport team. Leading the A3T-class, the SEAT Leon of the Spanish SUNRED team (Oscar Nogues-Michael Rossi-Ferran Monje-Borja Veiga) was in the top ten for a long time, but dropped back after a collision. Still, the SUNRED team scored a 1–2 in this class.

The German Black Falcon team that has won the title in the German Langstreckenmeisterschaft Nürburgring for the past two years also had a debut in Dubai, winning the SP2-class with the BMW M3 (Vimal Metha-Sean Patrick Breslin-Sean Paul Breslin-Christer Jöns-Alexander Böhm) and the A4-class with the BMW Z4 Coupé (Oleg Volin-Andrii Lebed-Marc Colell-Kai Riebetz-Alexander Böhm). There was local success for the AUH Motorsport team that won the SP3-class with the Aston Martin V8 Vantage, driven by Humaid Al Masaood-Alex Kapadia-Michael Prophet-Eric Charles. The A2-class brought victory for Team Sally Racing from Denmark, their Renault Clio driven by Anders Maigaard-Dan Brian Träger-Martin Sally Pederson-Brian Borger-Mick Reimerson. Victory in the D1 class, last but not least, went to the Marcos Racing International BMW 120D of Jim Briody-Hal Prewitt-Toto Lassally-Cor Euser.

Rank	Class	No.	Team	Drivers	Car	Laps	Gap	Fastest lap
1	A6	66	(France) IMSA Performance Matmut	(France) Raymond Narac (France) Patrick Pilet (Germany) Marco Holzer	Porsche 997 GT3 RSR	608		2:03.892
2	A5	40	(Japan) Petronas Syntium Team	(Japan) Nobuteru Taniguchi (Japan) Masataka Yanagida (Malaysia) Fariqe Hairuman (Liechtenstein) Johannes Stuck (Japan) Hiroki Yoshida	BMW Z4 M-Coupé	605	+3 Laps	2:05.594
3	A5	2	(Saudi Arabia) Al Faisal Racing	(Saudi Arabia) Abdulaziz Al Faisal (Germany) Claudia Hürtgen (Germany) Marko Hartung (Saudi Arabia) Khaled Al Faisal	BMW Z4 M-Coupé	603	+5 Laps	2:06&5
4	A6	31	(Germany) Land Motorsport	(Germany) Jürgen Häring (Greece) Taki Konstantinou (Germany) René Münnich (Germany) Marc Basseng	Porsche 997 GT3 Cup	588	+20 Laps	2:06.998
5	A6	16	(Poland) Lukas Motorsport	(Poland) Robert Lukas (Poland) Mariusz Miekos (Poland) Stefan Bilinski (Poland) Teodor Myszkowski (Poland) Adam Kornacki	Porsche 997 GT3 Cup	573	+35 Laps	2:08.975
6	A6	11	(Germany) CC Car Collection	(Germany) Heinz Schmersal (Germany) Mike Stursberg (Germany) Stephan Rösler (Germany) Christoph Koslowski	Porsche 997 GT3 Cup	568	+40 Laps	2:11.085
7	A6	5	(Sweden) Team Need For Speed	(Sweden) Hubert Bergh (Sweden) Magnus Öhman (Sweden) Patrik Söderlund (Sweden) Johan Sturesson	Porsche 997 Supercup	567	+41 Laps	2:08.675
8	A6	18	(Ukraine) Tsunami RT	(Ukraine) Oleksandr Gaidai (Ukraine) Arno Klasen (Ukraine) Andrii Kruglyk (Germany) Michael Schratz	Porsche 997 GT3 Cup	567	+41 Laps	2:09.353
9	A6	10	(Germany) CC Car Collection	(Germany) Peter Schmidt (Germany) Kersten Jodexnis (Germany) David Horn (Germany) Hans-Christian Zink	Porsche 997 GT3 Cup	566	+42 Laps	2:09.856
10	A6	25	(Germany) Hermes Attempto Racing Gmbh	(Germany) Sven Heyrowsky (Germany) Dietmar Haggenmüller (Germany) Florian Scholze	Porsche 997 Cup	564	+44 Laps	2:10.107
11	D2	33	BMW Team Hungary with Efficient Dynamics	(Hungary) Lászlò Palik (Hungary) János Vida (Hungary) Csaba Walter (Hungary) Gábor Wéber	BMW 120D	560	+48 Laps	2:16.408
12	SP2	111	(Germany) Team Black Falcon	(Tanzania) Vimal Mehta (Republic of Ireland) Sean Patrick Breslin (Republic of Ireland) Sean Paul Breslin (Germany) Christer Jöns (Germany) Alexander Böhm	BMW M3	560	+48 Laps	2:12.622
13	SP1	168	(Hungary) Bovi Motorsport	(Hungary) Kalman Bodis (Hungary) Attila Barta (Hungary) Istvàn Ràcz (Germany) Wolfgang Kaufmann	Brokernet Silver Sting	556	+52 Laps	2:08.661
14 DNF	A5	41	(Japan) Petronas Syntium Team	(Japan) Tatsuya Kataoka (Japan) Manabu Orido (Malaysia) Johan Adzmi (Japan) Kosuke Matsuura (Japan) Hiroki Yoshida	BMW Z4 M-Coupé	555	+53 Laps	2:06.871
15	SP2	46	(Belgium) VDS Racing Adventures	(Belgium) Raphael van der Straten (Belgium) Stéphane Lémeret (Belgium) José Close (United Arab Emirates) Karim Al Azhari	Ford Mustang FR500	555	+53 Laps	2:08.408
16	SP3	122	(United Arab Emirates) AUH Motorsports	(United Arab Emirates) Humaid Al Masaood (United Kingdom) Alex Kapadia (United Kingdom) Michael Prophet (United Kingdom) Eric Charles	Aston Martin V8 Vantage GT4	552	+56 Laps	2:13.706
17	SP3	22	(Saudi Arabia) Al Faisal Racing	(Saudi Arabia) Al Faisal (Germany) Jörg Viebahn (Germany) Spooner (Saudi Arabia) Saied Al Mouri	BMW M3 GT4	551	+57 Laps	2:15.192
18	SP3	124	(United Kingdom) Nicholas Mee Racing	(Switzerland) Karsten le Blanc (United Kingdom) David Clark (United Kingdom) Shaun Lynn (Germany) Wolfgang Kaufmann	Aston Martin V8 Vantage GT4	550	+58 Laps	2:15.192
19	SP3	129	(United Arab Emirates) DXB Racing	(France) Frederic Gaillard (United Kingdom) Jonathan Simmonds (United Kingdom) Julian Griffin (United Kingdom) Phil Quaife (United Kingdom) Robert Barff	Aston Martin V8 Vantage GT4	549	+59 Laps	2:13.762
20	A3T	74	(Spain) SUNRED Racing Team	(Spain) Oscar Nogués (France) Michaël Rossi (Spain) Ferran Monje (Spain) Borja Veiga	SEAT Leon Super Copa	546	+62 Laps	2:12.203
21	A3T	78	(Spain) SUNRED Racing Team	(Lebanon) Noel Jammal (Spain) Toni Forné (Spain) Marcos de Diego (Spain) Josep Maria Dabad	SEAT Leon Super Copa TFS	540	+68 Laps	2:14.463
22	SP2	147	(Luxembourg) Gravity Racing International	(Belgium) Stéphane Lémeret (Belgium) Loris de Sordi (Belgium) Vincent Radermecker (Luxembourg) Eric Lux (Luxembourg) Gérard Lopez	Mosler MT900R GT3	538	+70 Laps	2:06.010
23	SP3	123	(Netherlands) Donkervoort Racing	(Netherlands) Nico Pronk (Netherlands) Denis Donkervoort (Netherlands) Peter Kox (France) Stéphane Wintenberger	Donkervoort D8 GT	531	+77 Laps	2:14.403
24	SP3	121	(United Arab Emirates) AUH Motorsports	(United Arab Emirates) Jordon Grogor (United Arab Emirates) Bassam Kornfli (France) Alban Varutti (Germany) Martin Dechent	Aston Martin V8 Vantage GT4	527	+81 Laps	2:14.209
25	D2	19	(Netherlands) Nooren Autosport	(Netherlands) Marcel Nooren (Netherlands) Luc Braams (Netherlands) Wim van Genderen (Netherlands) Bas Koeten	BMW 120d	523	+85 Laps	2:23.931
26	SP1	171	(France) Gomez Competition	(France) Armand Funal (Belgium) Michael Schmetz (France) Jeremy Reymond (Luxembourg) Joe Schmitz	Solution F-Touring Cup	516	+92 Laps	2:14.256
27	A3T	75	(Germany) Tschornia Motorsport	(Liechtenstein) Johann Wanger (Liechtenstein) Patrick Hilty (Switzerland) Paul Hunsperger (Germany) Thomas Wasel (Germany) Matthias Wasel	VW Golf R-Line	516	+92 Laps	2:18.961
28	SP2	172	(Netherlands) Red Camel Racing	(Netherlands) Monny Krant (Canada) Jean-Sebastian Sauriol (Netherlands) Ivo Breukers (Netherlands) Henk Thijssen (Netherlands) Ton Verkoelen	Saker Sportscar GT TDI	509	+99 Laps	2:16.571
29	A5	45	(United Kingdom) Povey Motorsport with Pontoon Hire	(United Kingdom) Guy Povey (United Kingdom) Alistair Davidson (United Kingdom) Geoff Kimber-Smith (United Kingdom) Tom Kimber-Smith	BMW M3	502	+106 Laps	2:18.789
30	A2	89	(Denmark) Team Sally Racing	(Denmark) Anders Maigaard (Denmark) Dan Brian Träger (Denmark) Martin Sally Pederson (Denmark) Brian Borger (Denmark) Mick Reimerso	Renault Clio Cup	497	+111 Laps	2:26.103
31	A4	88	(Germany) Team Black Falcon	(Russia) Oleg Volin (Ukraine) Andrii Lebed (Switzerland) Marc Colell (Germany) Kai Riebetz (Germany) Alexander Böhm	BMW Z4 Coupe SI	494	+114 Laps	2:24.411
32	A2	90	(United Arab Emirates) Duel Racing	(United Arab Emirates) Ramzi Moutran (United Arab Emirates) Sami Moutran (United Arab Emirates) Nabil Moutran (Bahrain) Salman Bin Rashid Al-Khalifa	Renault Clio Cup	486	+122 Laps	2:24.551
33	A3T	71	(Australia) Strategic Transport Racing	(Australia) Malcolm Niall (Australia) Clint Harvey (Australia) Brett Niall (United Kingdom) Daniel Welch	SEAT Leon Super Copa	483	+125 Laps	2:14.672
34	D1	112	(Netherlands) Marcos Racing International	(United States) Jim Briody (United States) Hal Prewitt (El Salvador) Toto Lassally (Netherlands) Cor Euser	BMW 120d	479	+129 Laps	2:28.811
35	A2	86	(Belgium) Boutsen Energy Racing	(Portugal) Carlos Sarrea (Portugal) Michael Sarrea (France) Julien Piguet (France) Frederic Renner (France) Jean Michel Carton	Renault Clio Cup	474	+134 Laps	2:23.676
36 DNF	SP2	44	(Australia) Mal Rose Racing	(Australia) Mal Rose (Australia) Tony Alford (Australia) Peter Leemhuis	Holden Commodore SS	470	+138 Laps	2:09.484
37	A3T	73	(United Arab Emirates) Zengő Dubai Team Motorsport	(Hungary) Robert Galotti (Hungary) Balasz Galotti (Hungary) Tamás Révész (United Arab Emirates) Nadir Zuhour (France) Christophe Hissette	SEAT Leon Super Copa	468	+140 Laps	2:17.005
38	A5	42	(Italy) Jaco's Paddock Limited Motorsport	(Italy) Lorenzo Rocco (Italy) Masera (United Arab Emirates) Denat (United Kingdom) Joseph	BMW M3	467	+141 Laps	2:22.894
39	D1	117	(Netherlands) Marcos Racing International	(United Kingdom) Aaron Scott (United Kingdom) Andy Ruhan (United Kingdom) Bob Lyons (United Kingdom) Craig Wilkins (United Kingdom) Tommy Dreelan	BMW 120d	464	+144 Laps	2:28.650
40	A2	85	(Germany) Team Premier	(Germany) Hannes Waimer (Germany) Bernhard Schnell (Germany) Haus Hotfiel (Switzerland) Armin Schmid	Renault Clio Cup	463	+145 Laps	2:26.513
41	A4	62	(Luxembourg) Duwo Racing	(France) Frédéric Schmit (France) Nicolas Schmit (France) Jean-Louis Dauger (France) Antoine Orel (Luxembourg) Jean-Marie Dumont	BMW 130i Challenge	459	+149 Laps	2:25.753
42	SP2	145	(Denmark) GRC Racing	(United Kingdom) Jacob Thomsen (Norway) Harald Nordeng (Germany) Hans Peter Lieb (France) Thierry Blaise (France) Olivier Baharian	Aston Martin V8 Vantage N24	443	+165 Laps	2:15.477
43 DNF	A6	8	(Italy) De Lorenzi Racing	(Italy) Stefano Borghi (Italy) Piergiuseppe Perazzini (Italy) Marco Cioci (Italy) Gianluca de Lorenzi	Porsche 997 GT3 Cup S	438	+170 Laps	2:03.348
44	A2	95	(France) Team First	(France) David Carvalho (France) Alexandre Renneteau (France) Stephane Payelle (United Kingdom) Mike Wainwright (France) Fabien Giroix	Renault Clio Cup	435	+173 Laps	2:24.736
45 DNF	A2	87	(Belgium) Boutsen Energy Racing	(France) Sebastien Deveze (France) Philipe Vigneron (France) Jean-Charles Battut (Belgium) Pierre-Yves Rosoux (France) Jean-Michel Carton	Renault Clio Cup	420	+188 Laps	2:24.111
46	SP2	146	(Hong Kong) Craft Racing	(Canada) Eric Ying Wai Cheung (Hong Kong) Frank Yu (United Kingdom) Richard Dean (Japan) Aki Hiro Tsusuki	Ginetta G50Z GT3	412	+196 Laps	2:07.989
47	D1	116	(Netherlands) Marcos Racing International	(United Kingdom) Trevor Knight (Netherlands) Fred van Putten (Netherlands) Jafeth Molenaar (Spain) Santi Navarro	BMW 120d	410	+198 Laps	2:29.581
48	SP3	120	(United Kingdom) Brunswick Automotive	(United Kingdom) Mark Griffiths (Russia) Nikolay Zhuravlev (Belgium) Rigo Mey (United Kingdom) Nick Gooch (United Kingdom) Ian Barrowman	Aston Martin V8 Vantage	408	+200 Laps	2:16.307
49	SP3	125	(United Kingdom) Nicholas Mee Racing	(Lebanon) Tarek Mahmoud (Lebanon) Greg Audi (Lebanon) Jalal Mahmoud (France) Corentine Quiniou	Aston Martin V8 Vantage GT4	403	+205 Laps	2:16.700
50 DNF	A6	65	(France) IMSA Performance Matmut	(France) Christophe Bourret (France) Pascal Gibon (France) Richard Balandras	Porsche 997 GT3 RSR	400	+208 Laps	2:04.255
51	A3T	72	(Australia) Strategic Transport Racing	(Australia) Mark Pilatti (Australia) Glen Zampatti (Australia) Callaghan (Italy) Gablziani	SEAT Leon Super Copa	397	+211 Laps	2:17.141
52	A4	165	(Japan) Team 930 Rush	(Japan) Yutaka Matsushima (Japan) Masashi Kakiuchi (Japan) Jun Yamashita (Japan) Yousuke Shimojima	Porsche 964 Carrera	356	+252 Laps	2:18.230
53	A4	61	(Czech Republic) K&K Racing Team	(Czech Republic) Marcel Kusin (Czech Republic) Petr Valek (Czech Republic) Stepan Ladik (Czech Republic) Petr Fulin	BMW 130i	348	+260 Laps	2:20.588
54	SP3	128	(Switzerland) Gentle Swiss Racing	(Switzerland) Frederic Barth (Switzerland) Stefano Comini (Germany) Wolfgang Kudrass (Germany) Valentin Hummel	Aston Martin V8 Vantage N24	342	+266 Laps	2:15.874
55	A2	57	(United Arab Emirates) LAP57 Racing Team	(United Arab Emirates) Mohammed Al Owais (United Arab Emirates) Omran Al Owais (United Arab Emirates) Saeed Al Mehairi (Pakistan) Umair Ahmed Khan	Honda Civic Type R	341	+267 Laps	2:23.452
56 DNF	A6	9	(Italy) De Lorenzi Racing	(Italy) Giorgio Piodi (Italy) "Jox" (Italy) Angelo Cobianchi (Italy) Guido Formilli Fendi	Porsche 997 GT3 Cup	337	+271 Laps	2:10.468
57	D1	105	(Netherlands) Certainly Racing Team	(Netherlands) Marcel van Leen (Belgium) Sven Andries (Netherlands) Christiaan Frankenhout (Germany) Sebastian Kamps	BMW 120d	322	+286 Laps	2:27.190
58 DNF	SP2	155	(Germany) Rhino's Leipert Motorsport	(Germany) Roland Hertner (Czech Republic) Peter Röschmann (Lithuania) Andzej Dzikevic (Germany) Roland Rehfeld (Germany) Marcel Leipert	Ascari KZ1-R GT3	304	+304 Laps	2:05.555
59 DNF	A6	6	(Austria) Jetalliance Racing	(Austria) Lukas Lichtner-Hoyer (Australia) Vitus Eckert (Germany) Marco Seefried (United Kingdom) Martin Rich	Porsche 997 Cup	287	+321 Laps	2:09.934
60 DNF	D1	108	(Netherlands) Red Camel Racing	(Netherlands) Monny Krant (Canada) Jean-Sebastian Sauriol (Netherlands) Ivo Breukers (Netherlands) Henk Thijssen (Netherlands) Wolf Nathan	SEAT Leon TDI	286	+322 Laps	2:28.232
61 DNF	SP1	170	(France) Gomez Competition	(France) Jean-Marc Merlin (France) Damien Kohler (Belgium) Michel Pulinx (Belgium) Yves Provins	Solution F-Touring Cup	261	+347 Laps	2:19.581
62 DNF	SP3	70	(Germany) RED Motorsport	(Germany) Martin Roos (Germany) Gunther Deutsch (Germany) Marco Deutsch (Poland) Karolina Lampel-Czapka	Lotus Exige GT4	248	+360 Laps	2:18.687
63 DNF	D1	110	Volkswagen Motorsport Austria	(Austria) Hannes Danzinger (Austria) Michael Kogler (Hungary) Levente Zoltan Lászlóf (Austria) Willi Rabl	VW Scirocco TDI	242	+366 Laps	2:24.666
64 DNF	A2	94	(France) Team First	(Germany) Roald Goethe (Ivory Coast) Frédéric Fatien (France) Jean-Pierre Valentini (France) Theophile Albertini (France) Fabien Giroix	Renault Clio Cup	221	+387 Laps	2:26.027
65 DNF	SP2	148	(Italy) AF Corse	(United States) Robert Kauffman (United States) Michael Waltrip (Australia) Marcos Ambrose (Portugal) Rui Águas (Italy) Nicola Cadei	Ferrari F430 GT2	210	+398 Laps	2:06.081
66	SP3	154	(Belgium) Speedlover	(Netherlands) Richard Verburg (Belgium) Jean-Michel Gérome (Belgium) Dirk de Groof (France) Jean-Michel Gérome	Aston Martin V8 Vantage N24	203	+405 Laps	2:16.177
67 DNF	A3T	76	(Hungary) Zengő Motorsport KTF	(Hungary) Tamás Horváth (Hungary) György Kontra (Hungary) Gábor Kismarty-Lechner (Hungary) Zoltan Zengo (Hungary) Istvan Gáspár	SEAT Leon Super Copa	182	+426 Laps	2:18.206
68 DNF	A6	1	(Germany) Land Motorsport	(France) Gabriel Abergel (France) Xavier Pompidou (Germany) Carsten Tilke (Germany) Otto Klohs	Posrche 997 GT3 Cup	176	+432 Laps	2:08(4
69 DNF	A6	3	(Germany) Besaplast Racing Team	(Croatia) Franjo Kovac (Germany) Martin Tschornia (Germany) Kurt Thiim (Germany) Roland Asch (Germany) Sebastian Asch	Posrche 997 GT3 Cup	168	+440 Laps	2:06.826
70 DNF	SP2	7	(Belgium) First Motorsport	(Belgium) Christian Kelders (Belgium) Philippe Greisch (France) Daniel Desbrueres (France) Catherine Desbrueres	Ferrari F430 GT3	151	+457 Laps	2:08.120
71 DNF	A6	17	(China) Track Torque Racing	(United Kingdom) Matthew Perry (Hong Kong) Nigel Farmer (Italy) Nicola Pantone	Ginetta G50	124	+484 Laps	2:16.486
72 DNF	A6	4	(Slovakia) ARC Bratislava	(Slovakia) Miro Konôpka (United Kingdom) Oliver Morley (United Kingdom) Sean Edwards (Austria) Richard Cvörnjek	Porsche 911 GT3	87	+521 Laps	2:10.992
73	A3T	77	(United Kingdom) WRC Developments	(United Kingdom) James Kaye (United Kingdom) James Emmett (United Arab Emirates) Raed Hassan (United Kingdom) Mark Lemmer (United Kingdom) Luke Hines	Mitsubishi Lancer Evo X	56	+552 Laps	2:17.410
74 DNF	SP2	24	(Netherlands) H&P Incentives	(Netherlands) Peter van der Kolk (Netherlands) Jeroen Bleekemolen (Netherlands) Michael Bleekemolen (Netherlands) Henry Zumbrink (Netherlands) Jeroen van der Heuvel	BMW 140 GTR	1	+607 Laps	No Time
DNS	SP2	99	(Germany) Besaplast Racing Dolate Motorsport	(Germany) Frank Schmickler (Germany) Jörg Hardt	BMW M3	N/A	N/A	No Time
