= 2009 Dubai 24 Hour =

Motorsports endurance race

Seasons
- ← 2008 2010 →

The layout of the Dubai Autodrome.

The 2009 TOYO Tires Dubai 24 Hour was the 4th running of the Dubai 24 Hour endurance event. The race was held at the Dubai Autodrome and was organized by the promoter Creventic. The official event commenced on 8 January and finished on 10 January 2009.

== Overview ==
Practice days for the event began on 5 January 2009, followed by qualifying on 8 January which decided the grid positions for the race. The 24-hour event began on January 9 and finished on January 10. A total 78 entrants from all over the world participated in the event.

== Qualifying ==
Qualifying began on January 8 on a sunny afternoon. The cars from the A6 class dominated the top of the time table, and it was no surprise when one of the Porsche 997 GT3 cars occupied Pole Position. Apart from this, a notable curb in the domination of the Porsches was in the shape of a 3-Year Old Mégane driven by the Equipe Vershuur Team which took 3rd place on the grid with a stunning lap of 2:04.168, beating some of the more agile vehicles on the grid.

Pole position winners in each class are marked in bold.

Pos	No.	Team	Car	Class	Lap Time	Difference
1	**34**	**Autorlando Sport**	**Porsche 911 GT3 RSR**	**A6**	**2:01.183**	
2	41	Land Motorsport	Porsche 911 GT3 RSR	A6	2:02.487	+1.304
3	**107**	**Equipe Verschuur**	**Renault Mégane Trophy**	**SP1**	**2:04.168**	**+2.985**
4	46	Khaleji Motorsport	Porsche 997 GT3 Cup	A6	2:05.277	+4.094
5	**69**	**Al Faisal Racing**	**BMW Z4 Coupe**	**A5**	**2:05.279**	**+4.096**
6	33	Lukas Motorsport	Porsche 997 GT3 Cup	A6	2:06.506	+5.323
7	12	ARC Bratislava	Porsche 911 GT3	A6	2:07.276	+6.093
8	42	Land Motorsport	Porsche 997 GT3 Cup	A6	2:07.466	+6.283
9	28	Jetalliance Racing	Porsche 997 GT3 Cup	A6	2:08.084	+6.901
10	17	De Lorenzi Racing	Porsche 997 GT3 Cup	A6	2:08.268	+7.085
11	32	First Motorpsort	Porsche 997 GT3 Cup S	A6	2:08.282	+7.099
12	111	Bovi Motorsport	Brokernet Silver Sting	SP1	2:08.454	+7.271
13	100	Hubert Bergh Motorsport	Porsche 997 Supercup	A6	2:09.115	+7.932
14	35	CM Creativ Marketing GmbH	Porsche 996 GT3 Cup	A6	2:09.128	+7.945
15	**118**	**PMB Motorsport**	**Porsche 996 GT2-R**	**SP2**	**2:09.175**	**+7.992**
16	104	Khaleji Motorsport	Ferrari F430 GT	SP2	2:09.218	+8.035
17	103	Gravity Racing International	Mosler MT900R GT3	SP2	2:09.371	+8.188
18	9	Motorsport International	Jaguar X-type Silhouette	SP1	2:09.396	+8.213
19	77	Attempto Racing	Porsche 997 Cup	A6	2:09.626	+8.443
20	18	Besaplast Racing	Porsche 997 GT3 Cup	A6	2:09.630	+8.447
21	44	Mal Rose Racing	Holden Commodore SS	SP2	2:09.703	+8.520
22	23	RJN Motorsport	Nissan 350Z GT3	A5	2:10.193	+9.010
23	27	Autoweiland.de	Porsche 997 GT3 Cup	A6	2:10.688	+9.485
24	8	Duller Motorsport	BMW M3 GTR	A5	2:10.842	+9.659
25	39	CC Car Collectuon	Porsche 997 GT3 Cup	A6	2:10.945	+9.762
26	30	First Motorsport	Porsche 996 Supercup	A6	2:11.062	+9.879
27	117	PMB Motorsport	Porsche 996 GT2-R	SP2	2:11.419	+10.236
28	24	Motors TV	BMW 135i	SP2	2:11.469	+10.286
29	888	Audi CR-8 Team	Audi R8 LMS	SP2	2:11.603	+10.420
30	53	RJN Motorsport	Nissan 350Z	A5	2:11.965	+10.782
31	10	Duller Motorsport	BMW M3 GTR	A5	2:12.146	+10.963
32	26	Autoweiland.de	Porsche 997 Cup	A6	2:12.392	+11.209
33	101	SartoriusTeam Black Falcon	BMW M3 GTS	SP2	2:12.394	+11.211
34	3	Speedlover	Porsche 997 GT3	A6	2:12.412	+11.229
35	22	Chad Racing	Porsche 997 GT3 Cup	A6	2:12.424	+11.241
36	120	Empire Motorsports	Lotus 2 Eleven	A5	2:12.678	+11.495
37	15	CC Car Collection	Porsche 996 GT3 Cup	A6	2:13.610	+12.427
38	113	Gomez Competition	Solution-F Touring Cup	SP1	2:13.870	+12.687
39	112	Gomez Competition	Solution-F Touring Cup	SP1	2:13.939	+12.756
40	114	Gomez Competition	Solution-F Touring Cup	SP1	2:14.202	+13.019
41	29	First Competition	Porsche 996 Supercup	A6	2:14.574	+13.391
42	105	DXB Racing Dubai	Aston Martin V8 Vantage GT4	SP2	2:14.660	+13.477
43	109	Equipe Vershuur	Renault Mégane Trophy	SP1	2:14.847	+13.847
44	31	First Motorsport	Porsche 997	A6	2:14.873	+13.690
45	58	TeamA Sweden	Volkswagen Golf GTI	A5	2:14.935	+13.752
46	56	G&A Racing	BMW Z4 Coupe GT4	A5	2:15.117	+13.394
47	**73**	**PB Racing**	**Lotus Exige GT4**	**A4**	**2:16.592**	**+15.409**
48	72	Bas Koeten Racing	BMW Z3 Coupe M	A4	2:17.348	+16.165
49	**96**	**Tusnami Racing Team**	**BMW 120d**	**D1**	**2:17.781**	**+16.598**
50	52	Sartorius Team Black Falcon	BMW M3 GTS	A5	2:18.956	+17.773
51	116	VDS Racing Adventures	Ford Mustang FR500	SP2	2:19.114	+17.931
52	108	Equipe Verschuur	Renault Mégane Trophy	SP1	2:19.176	+17.993
53	50	Zengő Motorsport	SEAT León Supercopa	A5	2:19.522	+18.339
54	59	Tschornia-Motorsport	BMW 320i WTCC	A5	2:19.762	+18.579
55	62	Mana Alattar Racing	Audi TT	A5	2:20.467	+19.284
56	57	Raser Racing Team	SEAT León	A5	2:22.203	+21.020
57	**83**	**Team First**	**Renault Clio**	**A2**	**2:23.117**	**+21.934**
58	60	Tschornia-Motorsport	BMW 320i ETCC	A5	2:24.143	+22.960
59	67	GMC Pro-Sport	Audi TT	A5	2:24.305	+23.122
60	65	GMC Pro-Sport	SEAT León Supercopa	A5	2:24.759	+23.576
61	70	Brunswick Automotive	Mazda RX-7	A4	2:24.889	+23.716
62	79	Equipe Vershuur	Renault Clio III RS	A2	2:25.043	+23.860
63	25	GT Auto Passion	Renault Clio Cup	A2	2:25.145	+23.962
64	61	Mitsubishi Motors UK	Mitsubishi Lancer Evolution X	A5	2:25.185	+24.002
65	66	GMC Pro-Sport	SEAT León Supercopa	A5	2:25.996	+24.813
66	71	Stefan Kass Racing Team	MINI Cooper Challenge	A4	2:28.535	+27.352
67	55	Carworld Motorsport	Renault Clio Cup	A2	2:28.548	+27.365
68	36	Ebbing Motorsport	Volvo S60	A6	2:28.779	+27.596
69	**76**	**Endurance Club Hungary**	**Ford Fiesta ST**	**A1**	**2:29.641**	**+28.458**
70	78	Equipe Vershuur	Renault Clio Cup	A2	2:30.452	+29.269
71	80	Exigence Motorsport	Renault Clio Cup	A2	2:30.984	+29.801
72	93	Marcos International Racing	BMW 120d	D1	2:33.297	+23.114
73	90	Pachura Motorsport	VW Golf V2.0 TDI	D1	2:33.337	+32.154
74	95	Marcos International Racing	BMW 120d	D1	2:33.577	+32.394
75	84	Team Mirage Australia	Mitsubishi Mirage	A1	2:35.903	+34.720
76	85	Team Mirage Australia	Mitsubishi Mirage	A1	2:39.611	+38.428
77	99	Al Faisal Racing	BMW 320d	D1	No Time	N/A
78	94	Marcos Racing International	Marcos Mantis GT	SP1	No Time	N/A

== Race ==
After 24 hours of racing at the Dubai Autodrome, only 49.676 seconds separated the 1st and second 2nd cars in the fourth running of the TOYO Tires Dubai 24 Hour. The final hour of the race that saw no less than three changes of the lead, the Porsche 997 GT3 Cup, entered by German team Land Motorsport and driven by Carsten Tilke, Gabriël Abergel, Andrzej Dzikevic and Niclas Kentenich, came out on top, only just defending its lead from the charging Al Faisal Racing Team’s BMW Z4 Coupé M that was shared by Abdualziz Al Faisal, Paul Spooner, Claudia Hürtgen and Stian Sorlie. 3rd was taken by another Porsche, the Besaplast Racing Team entry of Martin Tschornia, Franjo Kovac, former DTM-champion Kurt Thiim and the father-and-son pairing of Roland Asch and Sebastian Asch.

The Autorlando Porsche, which started from pole-position with Richard Lietz behind the wheel, and the identical Land Motorsport entry, driven by Marc Basseng, were able to pull a gap over Claudia Hürtgen with the Al Faisal Racing BMW Z4 Coupé M on the first few laps. On lap seven, there was the first lead change as Basseng managed to overtake Lietz.

Later on, the Autorlando Porsche lost about 45 minutes in the pits when the rear section of the car needed repair after another driver had run into it. There was a close battle between the Al Faisal Racing BMW and the ARC Bratislava Porsche (Miroslav Konopka, Jiri Janak, Mauro Casadei, Rudiger Klos) for many hours during the night. Around 05.00 h, the BMW took the lead, partly as a result of its slightly better fuel-efficiency, and stayed there for the next couple of hours, with the ARC Bratislava-Porsche and the Porsches of the Besaplast Racing Team and Land Motorsport following closely.

Later in the morning, the battle between the Al Faisal Racing BMW and the ARC Bratislava Porsche heated up again. With 1 hours and 10 minutes remaining the BMW came into the pits with a puncture and resulting damage to the right rear bodywork of the car, which handed the lead to the ARC Bratislava Porsche. That team stayed in front for a while and looked on its way to victory, especially as the BMW team were given a one lap penalty because of taking a shortcut. However, with 42 minutes remaining, the Porsche came in for another fuel stop and soon after that came in with apparent suspension problems, losing more valuable time and dropping back to fourth.

At that time, the Land Motorsport Porsche found itself in the lead with Niclas Kentenich behind the wheel, but the young German was put under massive pressure by Claudia Hürtgen in the Al Faisal Racing BMW Z4 Coupe M, who was lapping up to twelve seconds per lap faster than the Porsche. Eventually, Kentenich drove the victory home for the Land Motorsport Porsche team, finishing just 49.676 seconds ahead of the BMW. The Besaplast Racing Porsche finished third, although finishing driver Sebastian Asch had to overcome massive brake problems in his final stint.

=== Results ===
Class winners in bold.

Pos	No.	Drivers	Team	Car	Class	Laps	Difference	Fastest lap
1	**42**	**(Germany) Carsten Tilke (France) Gabriël Abergel (Germany) Niclas Kentenich (Lithuania) Andrzej Dzikevic**	**Land Motorsport**	**Porsche 997 GT3 Cup**	**A6**	**573**		**2:07.319**
2	**69**	**(Saudi Arabia) Abdulaziz Al Faisal (United Kingdom) Paul Spooner (Norway) Stian Sorlie (Germany) Claudia Hürtgen**	**Al Faisal Racing**	**BMW Z4 Coupe**	**A5**	**573**	**+0:49.676**	**2:04.526**
3	18	(Croatia) Franjo Kovac (Germany) Martin Tschornia (Germany) Roland Asch (Germany) Sebastian Asch (Denmark) Kurt Thiim	Besaplast Racing Team	Porsche 997 GT3 Cup	A6	572	+1 Lap	2:07.141
4	12	(Slovakia) Miro Konôpka (United Kingdom) Oliver Morley (United Kingdom) Sean Edwards (Austria) Richard Cvornjek	ARC Bratislava	Porsche 911 GT3	A6	570	+3 Laps	2:05.513
5	100	(Germany) Sven Heyrowsky (Germany) Dietmar Haggenmüller (Germany) Florian Scholze	Hubert Bergh Motorsport	Porsche 997 Supercup	A6	566	+7 Laps	2:08.349
6	28	(Austria) Lukas Lichtner-Hoyer (Australia) Vitus Eckert (Germany) Marco Seefried (United Kingdom) Martin Rich (Austria) Thomas Gruber	Jetalliance Racing	Porsche 997 GT3 Cup	A6	566	+7 Laps	2:06.309
7	32		First Motorpsort	Porsche 997 GT3 Cup S	A6	548	+25 Laps	2:07.030
8	35		CM Creativ Marketing GmbH	Porsche 996 GT3 Cup	A6	546	+27 Laps	2:06.532
9	8		Duller Motorsport	BMW M3 GTR	A5	543	+30 Laps	2:10.466
10	17	(Italy) Giorgio Piodi (Italy) Jox (Italy) Angelo Cobianchi (Italy) Sergio Parato (Italy) Guido Formilli	De Lorenzi Racing	Porsche 997 GT3 Cup	A6	543	+30 Laps	2:07.030
11	**108**		**Equipe Verschuur**	**Renault Mégane Trophy**	**SP1**	**538**	**+35 Laps**	**2:08.640**
12	**105**	**(Switzerland) Frederic Gaillard (United Kingdom) Jonathan Simmonds (United Kingdom) Julian Griffin (United Kingdom) Phil Quaife**	**DXB Racing Dubai**	**Aston Martin V8 Vantage GT4**	**SP2**	**537**	**+36 Laps**	**2:14.054**
13	9		Motorsport International	Jaguar X-type Silhouette	SP1	533	+40 Laps	2:09.466
14	31		First Motorsport	Porsche 997	A6	533	+40 Laps	2:12.153
15	56		G&A Racing	BMW Z4 Coupe GT4	A5	533	+40 Laps	2:15.759
16	30		First Motorsport	Porsche 996 Supercup	A6	532	+41 Laps	2:08.510
17	11		Autoweiland.de	Porsche 997 Cup	A6	530 Laps	+43 Laps	2:09.201
18	116	(Belgium) Raphael van der Straten (Belgium) Stéphane Lémeret	VDS Racing Adventures	Ford Mustang FR500	SP2	528	+45 Laps	2:17.427
19	**99**		**Al Faisal Racing**	**BMW 320d**	**D1**	**526**	**+47 Laps**	**2:15.360**
20	33	(Poland) Robert Lukas (Poland) Mariusz Miekos (Poland) Stefan Bilinski (Poland) Teodor Myszkowski (Poland) Adam Kornacki	Lukas Motorsport	Porsche 997 GT3 Cup	A6	522	+51 Laps	2:07.899
21	112	(France) Jean-Marc Merlin (France) Damien Kohler (Belgium) Michel Pulinx (Belgium) Armand Fumal	Gomez Competition	Solution-F Touring Cup	SP1	522	+51 Laps	2:12.706
22	46		Khaleji Motorsport	Porsche 997 GT3 Cup	A6	519	+54 Laps	2:05.781
23	101	(Tanzania) Vimal Mehta (Republic of Ireland) Sean Patrick Beslin (Republic of Ireland) Sean Paul Breslin (Germany) Christer Jöns (Germany) Alexander Böhm	Sartorius Team Black Falcon	BMW M3 GTS	SP2	518	+55 Laps	2:12.017
24	77	(Germany) Sven Heyrowsky (Germany) Dietmar Haggenmüller (Germany) Florian Scholze	Attempto Racing	Porsche 997 Cup	A6	515	+58 Laps	2:07.948
25	22		Chad Racing	Porsche 997 GT3 Cup	A6	514	+59 Laps	2:08.728
26	34		Autorlando Sport	Porsche 911 GT3 RSR	A6	507	+66 Laps	2:02.524
27	52	(Russia) Oleg Volin (Ukraine) Andrii Lebed (Switzerland) Marc Colell (Germany) Kai Riebetz (Germany) Alexander Böhm	Sartorius Team Black Falcon	BMW M3 GTS	A5	505	+68 Laps	2:18.134
28	114		Gomez Competition	Solution-F Touring Cup	SP1	505	+68 Laps	2:15.144
29	39	(Germany) Heinz Schmersal (Germany) Mike Stursberg (Germany) Stefan Rösler (Germany) Christoph Koslowski	CC Car Collectuon	Porsche 997 GT3 Cup	A6	504	+69 Laps	2:08.766
30	**73**		**PB Racing**	**Lotus Exige GT4**	**A4**	**501**	**+72 Laps**	**2:15.654**
31	117		PMB Motorsport	Porsche 996 GT2-R	SP2	499	+74 Laps	2:07.493
32	111	(Hungary) Kalman Bodis (Hungary) Attila Barta (Hungary) Istvàn Ràcz	Bovi Motorsport	Brokernet Silver Sting	SP1	495	+78 Laps	2:08.358
33	44	(Australia) Craig Baird (Australia) Mal Rose (Australia) Peter Leenhuis (Australia) Tony Alford	Mal Rose Racing	Holden Commodore SS	SP2	494	+79 Laps	2:08.520
34	66		GMC Pro-Sport	SEAT León Supercopa	A5	489	+84 Laps	2:22.479
35	50	(Hungary) Tamás Horváth (Hungary) György Kontra (Hungary) Gábor Kismarty-Lechner	Zengő Motorsport	SEAT León Supercopa	A5	488	+85 Laps	2:21.010
36	113	(France) Yves Trovins	Gomez Competition	Solution-F Touring Cup	SP1	486	+87 Laps	2:12.801
37	**25**		**GT Auto Passion**	**Renault Clio Cup**	**A2**	**486**	**+87 Laps**	**2:24.826**
38	3	(Netherlands) Richard Verburg (Belgium) Jean-Michel Gérome (Belgium) Dirk de Groof (United Kingdom) Jean-Michel Gérome	Speedlover	Porsche 997 GT3	A6	481	+92 Laps	2:09.743
39	**84**		**Team Mirage Australia**	**Mitsubishi Mirage**	**A1**	**478**	**+95 Laps**	**2:34.384**
40	57		Raser Racing Team	SEAT León	A5	474	+99 Laps	2:17.341
41	85		Team Mirage Australia	Mitsubishi Mirage	A1	472	+101 Laps	2:35.372
42	83	(Germany) Roald Goethe (France) Frederic Fatien (France) Jean-Pierre Valentini (France) Theophile Albertini (France) Fabien Giroix	Team First	Renault Clio	A2	464	+109 Laps	2:22.907
43	36		Ebbing Motorsport	Volvo S60	A6	458	+115 Laps	2:27.149
44	120		Empire Motorsports	Lotus 2 Eleven	A5	456	+117 Laps	2:10.178
45	23		RJN Motorsport	Nissan 350Z GT3	A5	451	+122 Laps	2:10.442
46	79		GT Auto Passion	Renault Clio Cup	A2	439	+134 Laps	
47	80		Exigence Motorsport	Renault Clio Cup	A2	439	+134 Laps	2:30.765
48	67		GMC Pro-Sport	Audi TT	A5	426	+147 Laps	2:20.530
49	95	(United Kingdom) Trevor Knight (Netherlands) Fred van Putten (Netherlands) Jafeth Molenaar (Netherlands) Cor Euser	Marcos International Racing	BMW 120d	D1	425	+148 Laps	2:30.909
50	70	(United Kingdom) Giles Groombridge (United Kingdom) Dave Ashford (Belgium) Rigo Meys (United Kingdom) Sarah Munns (New Zealand) Blair Cole	Brunswick Automotive	Mazda RX-7	A4	417	+156 Laps	2:22.175
51	58		TeamA Sweden	Volkswagen Golf GTI	A5	403	+170 Laps	2:14.570
52	90		Pachura Motorsport	VW Golf V2.0 TDI	D1	386	+187 Laps	2:33.763
53	888		Audi CR-8 Team	Audi R8 LMS	SP2	343	+230 Laps	2:10.811
54	78		Equipe Vershuur	Renault Clio Cup	A2	342	+231 Laps	2:27.238
55	96	(Ukraine) Oleksandr Gayday (Ukraine) Aleksey Basov (Ukraine) Andrii Kruglyk (Germany) Michael Schratz	Tusnami Racing Team	BMW 120d	D1	331	+242 Laps	2:16.679
56	61		Mitsubishi Motors UK	Mitsubishi Lancer Evolution X	A5	318	+255 Laps	2:21.329
57	76	(Hungary) István Gáspár (Hungary) Gusztáv Herter (Hungary) Béla Nyitray (Hungary) Krisztián Fekete	Endurance Club Hungary	Ford Fiesta ST	A1	313	+260 Laps	2:28.216
58	62		Mana Alattar Racing	Audi TT	A5	295	+278 Laps	2:14.600
59			Khaleji Motorsport	Ferrari F430 GT	SP2	282	+291 Laps	2:08.400
DNF	60	(Liechtenstein) Johann Wanger (Liechtenstein) Patrick Hilty (Switzerland) Paul Hunsperger (Germany) Thomas Wasel (Germany) Matthias Wasel	Tschornia-Motorsport	BMW 320i ETCC	A5	268		2:21.570
DNF	24		Motors TV	BMW 135i	SP2	262		2:09.313
DNF	15	(Germany) Peter Schmidt (Germany) Kersten Jodexnis (Germany) David Horn (Germany) Hans-Christian Zink	CC Car Collection	Porsche 996 GT3 Cup	A6	253		2:12.863
DNF	53		RJN Motorsport	Nissan 350Z	A5	239		2:12.245
DNF	27		Autoweiland.de	Porsche 997 GT3 Cup	A6	222		2:10.780
DNF	53		RJN Motorsport	Nissan 350Z	A5	239		2:12.245
DNF	27		Autoweiland.de	Porsche 997 GT3 Cup	A6	222		2:10.780
DNF	41	(Germany) Jürgen Häring (Greece) Taki Konstantinou (Germany) René Münnich (Germany) Marc Basseng	Land Motorsport	Porsche 997 GT3 Cup	A6	209		2:03.436
DNF	93	(United States) Jim Briody (United States) Hal Prewitt (El Salvador) Toto Lassally (Netherlands) Cor Euser	Marcos International Racing	BMW 120d	D1	189		2:31.096
DNF	71		Stefan Kass Racing Team	MINI Cooper Challenge	A4	171		2:26.990
DNF	118		PMB Motorsport	Porsche 996 GT2-R	SP2	171		2:08.926
DNF	29		First Competition	Porsche 996 Supercup	A6	171		2:12.696
DNF	103	(Luxembourg) Loris de Sordi (Belgium) Vincent Radermecker (Luxembourg) Eric Lux (Spain) Gérard López	Gravity Racing International	Mosler MT900R GT3	SP2	153		2:08.836
DNF	72		Bas Koeten Racing	BMW Z3 Coupe M	A4	113		2:26.990
DNF	59		Tschornia-Motorsport	BMW 320i WTCC	A5	71		2:17.147
DNF	107		Equipe Verschuur	Renault Mégane Trophy	SP1	107		2:06.373
DNF	55		Carworld Motorsport	Renault Clio Cup	A2	55		2:28.472
DNF	31		Duller Motorsport	BMW M3 GTR	A5	4		2:18.978
