= 2016 Dubai 24 Hour =

Seasons
- ← 2015 2017 →

The layout of the Dubai Autodrome.

The 2016 Dubai 24 Hour was the 11th running of the Dubai 24 Hour. The event was held on 14 to 16 January at the Dubai Autodrome, United Arab Emirates. This was the largest field of cars in the history of the race with 100 entries and 98 starters. There were 14 Code 60 periods in the race. The same number as the previous year.

== Result ==
Pos	Class	No	Entrant	Drivers	Car	Laps
1	A-6 Pro	19	(Belgium) Belgian Audi Club Team WRT	(United Kingdom) Stuart Leonard (United Kingdom) Michael Meadows (Belgium) Laurens Vanthoor (France) Alain Ferté	Audi R8 LMS	588
2	A-6 Pro	16	(Germany) Black Falcon	(United Kingdom) Oliver Webb (United Kingdom) Oliver Morley (United States) Frankie Montecalvo (Saudi Arabia) Abdulaziz al Faisal (United Kingdom) Adam Christodoulou	Mercedes SLS AMG GT3	583
3	A-6 Pro	4	(Germany) C.ABT Racing	(Germany) Christer Jöns (Germany) Andreas Weishaupt (Spain) Isaac Tutumlu Lopez (Finland) Matias Henkola (Germany) Daniel Abt	Audi R8 LMS	580
4	A-6 AM	10	(Switzerland) Hofor Racing	(Netherlands) Christiaan Frankenhout (Germany) Kenneth Heyer (Switzerland) Roland Eggimann (Switzerland) Chantal Kroll (Switzerland) Michael Kroll	Mercedes SLS AMG GT3	578
5	A-6 Pro	14	(United Kingdom) Optimum Motorsport	(United Kingdom) Flick Haigh (Wales) Ryan Ratcliffe (United Kingdom) Joe Osborne (Germany) Frank Stippler	Audi R8 LMS	575
6	A-6 AM	22	(United Kingdom) Preci - Spark	(United Kingdom) David Jones (United Kingdom) Godfrey Jones (United Kingdom) Morgan Jones (United Kingdom) Philip Jones (United Kingdom) Gareth Jones	Mercedes SLS AMG GT3	575
7	A-6 AM	34	(Germany) Car Collection Motorsport	(Germany) Ingo Vogler (Germany) Elmar Grimm (Germany) Max Edelhoff (Germany) Gustav Edelhoff (Germany) Johannes Dr. Kirchhoff	Audi R8 LMS	573
8	A-6 Pro	333	(Netherlands) V8 Racing	(Netherlands) Nicky Pastorelli (Netherlands) Alex Van t'Hoff (Netherlands) Rick Abresch (Netherlands) Wolf Nathan	Chevrolet Corvette C7.R	572
9	A-6 Pro	7	(Austria) HB Racing	(Germany) Robert Renauer (Switzerland) Daniel Allemann (Germany) Ralf Bohn (Germany) Alfred Renauer	Lamborghini Huracan GT3	570
DNF	A-6 Pro	26	(Austria) Konrad Motorsport	(Switzerland) Mark Ineichen (Switzerland) Rolf Ineichen (Italy) Fabio Babini (Germany) Christian Engelhart (Austria) Franz Konrad	Lamborghini Huracan GT3	569
11	991	40	(Bahrain) Lechner Racing Middle East	(United Arab Emirates) Saeed Al Mehairi (Canada) Bashar Mardini (Germany) Sven Müller (United Arab Emirates) Hasher Al Maktoum (Netherlands) Jaap van Lagen	Porsche 991 Cup	568
12	991	81	(Bahrain) Lechner Racing Middle East	(Germany) Hannes Waimer (Germany) Wolfgang Triler (United Kingdom) Edward Jones (Austria) Christopher Zöchling (Netherlands) Charlie Frijns	Porsche 991 Cup	563
13	A-6 Pro	18	(Netherlands) V8 Racing	(Netherlands) Duncan Huisman (Netherlands) Max Braams (Netherlands) Luc Braams (Netherlands) Nick de Bruijn (China) Pu Jun Jin	Mercedes SLS AMG GT3	561
14	991	61	(Germany) Black Falcon Team TMD Friction	(Saudi Arabia) Saud Al Faisal (Germany) Manuel Metzger (Netherlands) Gerwin Schuring (Saudi Arabia) Saeed Al Mouri (Denmark) Anders Fjordbach	Porsche 991 Cup	559
15	991	90	(Poland) Platinum Racing	(Mexico) Pablo Sanchez (Mexico) Santiago Creel (Germany) Christopher Bauer (Germany) Patrick Eisemann (Poland) Robert Lukas	Porsche 991 Cup	554
16	SP2	64	(France) Porsche Lorient Racing	(France) Frédéric Ancel (France) Christophe Bourret (France) Pascal Gibon (France) Jean-François Demorge (France) Philippe Polette	Porsche 997 Cup S	553
17	991	60	(Germany) Black Falcon Team TMD Friction	(Germany) Burkard Kaiser (Germany) Sören Spreng (Russia) Stanislav Minsky (Germany) Mark Wallenwein (Austria) Klaus Bachler	Porsche 991 Cup	550
DNF	A-6 Pro	27	(Germany) SPS automotive-performance	(Germany) Alex Müller (Germany) Tim Müller (Germany) Lance David Arnold (Germany) Valentin Pierburg	Mercedes SLS AMG GT3	549
19	A-6 Pro	888	(United Arab Emirates) Dragon Racing	(Republic of Ireland) Matt Griffin (United Kingdom) Alex Kapadia (United Kingdom) John Hartshorne (Kuwait) Khaled Al-Mudhaf (United Kingdom) Rob Barff	Ferrari 458 Italia GT3	545
20	991	20	PFI Racing Sweden	(Sweden) Henric Skoog (Sweden) Patrik Skoog (Sweden) Erik Behrens (Sweden) Kenneth Pantzer (Sweden) Gustav Bard	Porsche 991 Cup	544
21	A-6 Pro	30	(United Kingdom) Ram Racing	(United Kingdom) Paul White (United Kingdom) Tom Onslow-Cole (Germany) Thomas Jäger (United Kingdom) Stuart Hall (Germany) Roald Goethe	Mercedes SLS AMG GT3	544
22	A-6 AM	45	(Germany) Artthea Sport	(Denmark) Martin Gøtsche (Denmark) Nanna Gøtsche (Germany) Jens Feucht (Germany) Klaus Werner	Porsche 991 GT America	540
23	A-6 Pro	25	(Germany) MRS GT-racing	(Saudi Arabia) Ahmed Bin Khanen (Canada) Bassam Kronfli (Russia) Ilya Melkinov (Japan) Tomonobu Fujii	Nissan GT-R GT3	536
24	SP3	229	(United Kingdom) Century Motorsport	(United Kingdom) Nathan Freke (United Kingdom) Anna Walewska (Norway) Aleksander Schjerpen (United Kingdom) Tom Oliphant	Ginetta G55 GT4	536
DNF	991	80	(Bahrain) Lechner Racing Middle East	(France) Nicolas Misslin (France) Bruno Tortora (Germany) Alex Autumn (Netherlands) Jaap van Lagen (Austria) Christopher Zöchling	Porsche 991 Cup	534
26	A-6 Am	17	(France) IDEC SPORT RACING	(Switzerland) Frederic Yerly (France) Gabriel Abergel (France) Paul Lafargue (France) Patrice Lafargue	Mercedes SLS AMG GT3	533
27	SP2	203	(France) Vortex V8	(France) Mathieu Pontais (France) Alban Varutti (France) Cyril Calmon (France) Lionel Amrouche	GC Automobile GC 10 V8	532
28	SP3	178	(United Kingdom) CWS 4x4	(United Kingdom) Colin White (United Kingdom) Stephen Fresle (United Kingdom) Matthew Nicoll-Jones (United Kingdom) Hunter Abbott	Ginetta G55 GT4	532
29	SP3	221	(United Kingdom) J W BIRD Motorsport	(United Kingdom) Rory Butcher (United Kingdom) Jake Giddings (United Kingdom) Liam Griffin (United Kingdom) Kieran Griffin	Aston Martin Vantage GT4	529
30	991	89	(Poland) Förch Racing by Lukas Motorsport	(Mexico) Santos Zanella (Mexico) Oscar Arroyo (Poland) Dominik Kotarba-Majkutewicz (Poland) Rafal Mikrut (Mexico) Santiago Creel	Porsche 991 Cup	528
31	SP3	223	(United Kingdom) Optimum Motorsport	(United Kingdom) Bradley Ellis (United Kingdom) Ade Barwick (Republic of Ireland) Dan O'Brien (United Kingdom) Elliott Norris	Ginetta G55 GT4	526
32	TCR	1	(Lebanon) Memac Ogilvy Duel Racing	(United Kingdom) Phil Quaife (United Kingdom) Sami Moutran (United Kingdom) Nabil Moutran (United Kingdom) Ramzi Moutran	Seat Leon Cup Racer	524
33	991	73	(Germany) HRT Performance	(Denmark) Rene Ogrocki (Lithuania) Gediminas Udras (Australia) Stephen Borness (Germany) Oliver Freymuth (Germany) Holger Harmsen	Porsche 991 Cup	521
34	A3	208	(France) Team Altran Peugeot	(France) Stéphane Ventaja (France) Thierry Blaise (France) Guillaume Roman (Denmark) Kim Holmgaard	Peugeot 208 GTi	521
35	SP3	225	(Germany) Sorg Rennsport	(Iran) Meisam Taheri (Germany) Torsten Kratz (Germany) Stefan Beyer (Germany) Ulf Wickop (Denmark) Frederik Nymark	BMW E92 M3 GT4	519
36	SP3	284	(Italy) Nova Race	(Italy) Luca Magnoni (Italy) Gianluca Carboni (Italy) Roberto Gentili (Italy) Luca Rangoni (United Kingdom) William Moore	Ginetta G55 GT4	517
DNF	A6-Pro	28	(Germany) Land-Motorsport GmbH	(Germany) Marc Basseng (Germany) Christopher Mies (Germany) Carsten Tilke (United States) Connor De Phillippi	Audi R8 LMS	515
38	A2	165	(Germany) Besaplast Racing	(Germany) Friedhelm Erlebach (Germany) Henry Littig (Sweden) Fredrik Lestrup (Croatia) Franjo Kovac	Mini Cooper S JCW	509
39	A2	57	(United Arab Emirates) LAP57 Racing Team	(Japan) Junichi Umemoto (United Arab Emirates) Abdullah Al Hammadi (United Arab Emirates) Nadir Zuhour (United Arab Emirates) Mohammed Al Owais (Sri Lanka) Rupesh Channake	Honda Integra Type-R	505
40	SP3	230	(United Kingdom) Century Motorsport	(United Kingdom) Jake Rattenbury (United Kingdom) David Pattison (United Kingdom) Ollie Jackson (Russia) Ruben Anakhasyan	Ginetta G55 GT4	505
41	A2	171	(Denmark) Team K-Rejser	(Denmark) Jan Engelbrecht (Denmark) Jacob Kristensen (Denmark) Thomas Sørensen (Denmark) Claus Bertelsen (Denmark) Jens Mølgaard	Peugeot RCZ	505
42	991	37	(San Marino) GDL racing	(France) Olivier Baharian (Switzerland) Richard Feller (Switzerland) Franco Piergiovanni (Switzerland) Manuel Nicolaidis	Porsche 991 Cup	505
43	Cup 1	148	(Belgium) QSR	(Belgium) Jimmy de Breucker (Belgium) Mario Timmers (Belgium) Luc Moortgat (Belgium) Pieter Vanneste (Belgium) Dylan Derdaele	BMW M235i Racing Cup	505
44	991	62	(Austria) MSG Motorsport	(United Kingdom) Daniel Cammish (Austria) Luca Rattenbacher (Austria) Martin Konrad (Argentina) Facu Regalia (Sweden) Frederik Nordström	Porsche 991 Cup	503
45	A2	172	(Denmark) Team Sally Racing	(Denmark) Sune Marcussen (Denmark) Peter Obel (Denmark) Martin Sally Pedersen (Denmark) Michael Vesthave (Denmark) Steffan Jusjong	Renault Clio Cup III	501
46	A2	173	(Belgium) VDS Racing Adventures	(Belgium) Grégory Paisse (Belgium) Raphaël van der Straten (Belgium) José Close (Belgium) Pascal Kevers (Belgium) Joël Vanloocke	Honda Civic Type-R EP3	500
47	Cup 1	235	(Luxembourg) DUWO Racing	(France) Thierry Chkondali (France) Nicolas Schmidt (France) Frederic Schmidt (Luxembourg) Maurice Faber (Luxembourg) Jean-Marie Dumont	BMW M235i Racing Cup	500
48	SP2	85	(Belgium) Speedlover	(Belgium) Jean-Michel Gerome (United States) Vic Rice (Netherlands) Richard Verburg (Belgium) Dries Vanthoor (Belgium) Yves Noel	Porsche 991 Cup	498
49	Cup 1	145	(Germany) Bonk Motorsport	(Germany) Phillip Bethke (Germany) Volker Piepmeyer (Germany) Axel Burghardt (Germany) Michael Bonk (Netherlands) Liesette Braams	BMW M235i Racing Cup	497
50	SP3	224	(Czech Republic) RTR Projects	(Czech Republic) Milan Kodídek (Belarus) Siarhei Paulavets (Czech Republic) Tomas Miniberger (Czech Republic) Tomas Kwolek	KTM X-Bow GT4	496
51	A2	161	(Denmark) AD Racing/Flexlease.nu	(Denmark) Mikkel Thybo Løvendahl Gregersen (Denmark) Søren Zylauv (Denmark) Anders Christian Rasmussen (Denmark) Jacob Mathiasen (Denmark) Mikkel Johnsen	Renault Clio Cup III	493
52	SP2	84	(Belgium) Speedlover	(Belgium) Charel Arendt (France) Philippe Richard (Belgium) Pierre-Yves Paque	Porsche 991 Cup	491
53	TCR	130	(United Kingdom) Zest Racecar Engineering	(United Kingdom) Andrew Hack (United Kingdom) Daniel Wheeler (United Kingdom) Kane Astin (United Kingdom) Lucas Orrock	Seat Leon Cup Racer	485
54	A3	99	(United Kingdom) RKC/TGM	(United Kingdom) Gavin Spencer (United Kingdom) David Drinkwater (United Kingdom) William Gannon (United Kingdom) Thomas Gannon (United Kingdom) Ricky Coomber	Seat Leon Supercopa	479
55	A2	167	(United Kingdom) Preptech UK	(United Kingdom) Andy Mollison (Australia) Cody Hill (United Kingdom) Andrew Gordon-Colebrooke (United Kingdom) Alex Sedgwick	Renault Clio Cup III	479
56	A2	216	(Hong Kong) Modena Motorsports	(Netherlands) Francis Tjia (Canada) Wayne Shen (Netherlands) Marcel Tjia (Canada) John Shen (Switzerland) Mathias Beche	Renault Clio Cup III	479
57	991	35	(France) B2F compétition	(France) Alexandre Prémat (France) Michel Mitieus (France) Bruno Fretin (France) Benoit Fretin	Porsche 991 Cup	476
58	A2	217	(Hong Kong) Modena Motorsports	(Canada) Wayne Shen (Netherlands) Francis Tjia (Canada) Christian Chia (Canada) John Shen (Netherlands) Marcel Tjia	Renault Clio Cup III	475
59	Cup 1	146	(Germany) Bonk Motorsport	(Germany) Rainer Partl (Germany) Hermann Bock (Germany) Max Partl	BMW M235i Racing Cup	470
DNF	SP3	102	(Netherlands) JR Motorsport	(United Kingdom) Steven Liquorish (Belgium) Patrick van Glabeke (Netherlands) Bob Herber (Netherlands) Martin Lanting	BMW E90	468
61	TCR	125	(Netherlands) NKPP Racing	(Netherlands) Gijs Bessem (Netherlands) Harry Hilders (Netherlands) Roger Grouwels (Netherlands) Bert de Heus	Seat Leon Cup Racer	467
62	A2	69	(United Arab Emirates) 2W Racing	(Scotland) Will Morrison (United Kingdom) Simon Dennis (United Kingdom) Julian Griffin (France) Youssef Bassil (Scotland) Colin Boyle	Renault Clio Cup III	465
DNF	SP2	92	MARC Cars Australia	(Australia) Jake Camilleri (Australia) Morgan Haber (Netherlands) Milan Dontje (Bahrain) Amro Al-Hamad	MARC Focus V8	462
DNF	SP3	103	(Netherlands) JR Motorsport	(Greece) Kriton Lendoulis (Netherlands) Daan Meijer (Netherlands) Dennis Houweling (Italy) Francesco Castellacci	BMW E46 GTR	453
65	A2	112	(Switzerland) presenza.eu Racing Team Clio	(Denmark) Sonny Nielsen (Italy) Luigi Stanco (Switzerland) Stefan Tanner (Netherlands) Christian Dijkhof (Switzerland) Yoshiki Ohmura	Renault Clio Cup IV	453
66	SP3	111	(United Kingdom) track-club	(United Kingdom) Glenn Sherwood (United Kingdom) Jamie Stanley (United Kingdom) Adam Knight (United Kingdom) Osman Yusuf	Lotus Evora GT4	446
67	A2	191	(United Arab Emirates) SVDP Racing	(Australia) Christopher Wishart (South Africa) Kris Budnik (United Kingdom) Jason O'Keefe (United Kingdom) Spencer Vanderpal (Netherlands) Wubbe Herlaar	BMW 120d	443
68	A6-Am	8	(Belgium) BOUTSEN GINION RACING	(France) Eric Vassiere (France) Andre-Alain Corbel (Belgium) Christophe de Fierlant (France) Daniel Waszczinski	Renault RS01 FGT3	438
69	991	97	(San Marino) GDL Racing	(Italy) Massimo Vignali (France) Rémi Terrail (France) Franck Pelle (Finland) Rory Penttinen	Porsche 991 Cup	435
70	A3	21	(Poland) RTG by Gladysz Racing	(Poland) Adam Gładysz (Poland) Marcin Jaros (Lithuania) Robertas Kupcikas (Poland) Jerzy Dudek (Sweden) Simon Larsson	Seat Leon Supercopa	435
DNF	SP2	47	(San Marino) GDL team Asia	(Singapore) Lim Keong Liam (Singapore) Bruce Lee (Hong Kong) Nigel Laurence Farmer (Malaysia) Gilbert Ang Dingfeng	Porsche 997 Cup SF	418
72	TCR	126	(United Kingdom) CTR-Alfatune	(United Kingdom) Christopher Bentley (United Kingdom) John Clonis (Brazil) Adriano Medeiros (United Kingdom) Robert Gilham	Seat Leon Cup Racer	412
73	A6-Pro	6	(Belgium) Gravity Racing International	(Belgium) Vincent Radermecker (Luxembourg) Christian Kelders (Spain) Gérard López (Luxembourg) Eric Lux	Mercedes SLS AMG GT3	396
DNF	A6-Pro	66	(Germany) Attempto Racing	(Austria) Sven Heyrowsky (Turkey) Arkin Aka (Germany) Hans Wehrmann (France) Nicolas Armindo (Germany) Edward Lewis Brauner	Porsche 997 GT3 R	391
DNF	SP3	70	(Netherlands) Cor Euser Racing	(Netherlands) Richard Verburg (United States) Dom Bastien (Netherlands) Cor Euser (United States) Vic Rice (Norway) Einar Thorsen	Lotus Evora GT4	387
DNF	A6-Am	12	(Germany) Leipert Motorsport	(Russia) Mikhail Spiridonov (France) Franck Leone-Provost (Canada) Jean-Charles Perrin (Nigeria) Shahin Nouri	Lamborghini Huracan Trofeo	383
DNF	SP2	77	(San Marino) GDL team Asia	(Australia) John Iossifidis (United Arab Emirates) Karim Al Azhari (Italy) Roberto Ferri (Italy) Gianluca de Lorenzi	Porsche 991 Cup	375
DNF	A6-Pro	33	(Germany) Car Collection Motorsport	(Germany) Markus Winkelhock (Germany) Claudia Hürtgen (Germany) Heinz Schmersal (Germany) Pierre Ehret (Germany) Peter Schmidt	Audi R8 LMS	361
DNF	991	46	(Germany) MRS GT-Racing	(Japan) Yutaka Matsushima (Japan) Tomoyuki Takizawa (United Arab Emirates) Nadir Zuhour (Denmark) Mikkel O. Pedersen (Luxembourg) Dylan Pereira	Porsche 991 Cup	354
DNF	A2	48	(United Arab Emirates) ZRT Motorsport	(United Kingdom) Tim Stevens (Scotland) Graham Davidson (Pakistan) Umair Khan (Republic of Ireland) Jonathan Mullan	Honda DC5	349
81	A3	101	(Germany) Hofor-Kuepper Racing	(Germany) Bernd Küpper (Switzerland) Martin Kroll (Germany) Oliver Bender (Germany) Lars Zander (Switzerland) Michael Kroll	BMW E46 M3 Coupe	321
DNC	SP3	227	(United Kingdom) Speedworks Motorsport	(United Kingdom) Devon Modell (United Kingdom) John Gilbert (United Kingdom) Ollie Hancock (United Kingdom) Will Schryver	Aston Martin Vantage GT4	312
DNC	991	72	(Germany) HRT Performance	(Argentina) José Luis Talermann (Germany) Kim André Hauschild (Canada) Alex Tagliani (Canada) Jean-Frederic Laberge (Germany) Harald Hennes	Porsche 991 Cup	305
DNC	A6-Am	999	(Germany) Attempto Racing	(Germany) Dirk Vorländer (Germany) Dimitri Parhofer (Germany) Dirg Parhofer (Italy) Daniel Zampieri (Germany) Andreas Liehm	Porsche 997 GT3	275
DNC	SP2	91	MARC Cars Australia	(Australia) Tony Alford (Australia) Mark Griffith (Australia) Malcolm Niall (Switzerland) Kurt Thiel	MARC Focus V8	273
DNC	A3	205	(France) Team Altran Peugeot	(France) Thierry Boyer (Switzerland) Jérôme Ogay (Denmark) Michael Carlsen (Switzerland) Mathias Schläppi (Belgium) Sarah Bovy	Peugeot 208 GTi	244
DNC	A6-Pro	11	(Czech Republic) Scuderia Praha	(Czech Republic) Jiri Pisarik (Netherlands) Peter Kox (Italy) Matteo Malucelli (Italy) Matteo Cressoni	Ferrari 458 Italia GT3	233
DNC	A3	105	UNIOR Racing Team Austria	(Austria) Bernhard Wagner (Austria) Peter Schöller (Austria) Michael Kogler	Seat Leon Supercopa	214
DNC	A6-Am	67	(San Marino) GDL racing	(Netherlands) Ivo Breukers (Netherlands) Rik Breukers (Netherlands) Renger van der Zande (Netherlands) Daniël de Jong	Mercedes SLS AMG GT3	199
DNC	A6-Pro	2	(Germany) Abu Dhabi Racing Black Falcon	(United Arab Emirates) Khaled Al Qubaisi (Germany) Hubert Haupt (Netherlands) Jeroen Bleekemolen (Germany) Maro Engel (Netherlands) Indy Dontje	Mercedes SLS AMG GT3	163
DNC	SP3	51	(Sweden) Primus Racing	(Sweden) Thomas Martinsson (Sweden) Johan Rosen (Sweden) Marcus Fluch (Denmark) Peter Larsen (Sweden) Magnus Holmström	Ginetta G50 GT4	159
DNC	A6-Pro	3	(Germany) Black Falcon	(Saudi Arabia) Abdulaziz Al Faisal (Germany) Hubert Haupt (Netherlands) Yelmer Buurman (Germany) Bernd Schneider (Poland) Michal Broniszewski	Mercedes SLS AMG GT3	154
DNC	A6-Am	88	(United Arab Emirates) Dragon Racing	(United Kingdom) Rob Barff (South Africa) Jordan Grogor (Switzerland) Tiziano Carugati (Switzerland) Gino Forgione (France) Frederic Fatien	Ferrari 458 Italia GT3	92
DNC	Cup 1	151	(Germany) Sorg Rennsport	(United Arab Emirates) Ahmed Al Melaihi (United Kingdom) Chris James (United Kingdom) Rebecca Jackson (United Kingdom) George Richardson (Peru) Ricardo Flores	BMW M235i Racing Cup	70
DNC	991	74	(Germany) HRT Performance	(France) Yann Faury (France) Gilles Petit (France) Laurent Sabatier (France) Jean-Charles Carminati	Porsche 991 Cup	54
DNC	991	63	(Austria) MSG Motorsport	(United Kingdom) Daniel Cammish (Austria) Luca Rattenbacher (Austria) Martin Konrad (Argentina) Facu Regalia (Sweden) Frederik Nordström	Porsche 991 Cup	15
DNC	991	78	(Germany) MRS GT-Racing	(United States) Charles Putman (Netherlands) Xavier Maassen (United States) Charles Espenlaub (United States) Joe Foster	Porsche 991 Cup	15
DNC	SP3	282	(Italy) Nova Race	(Italy) Luca Magnoni (Italy) Mark Speakerwas (Bulgaria) Pavel Lefterov (Italy) Fabio Ghizzi (Germany) Michael Hofmann	Ginetta G55 GT4	14
DNS	SP2	202	(Netherlands) Red Camel-Jordans.nl	(Switzerland) Toni Bueler (Austria) Klaus Kresnik (Netherlands) Bert de Heus (Netherlands) Sjaco Griffioen	MARC Mazda 3 V8	0
DNS	Cup 1	152	(Germany) Sorg Rennsport	(France) Pierre Martinet (France) Jules Gounon (France) Olivier Baron (Italy) Luca Cima	BMW M235i Racing Cup	0
