= Christer Jöns =

German racing driver (born 1987)

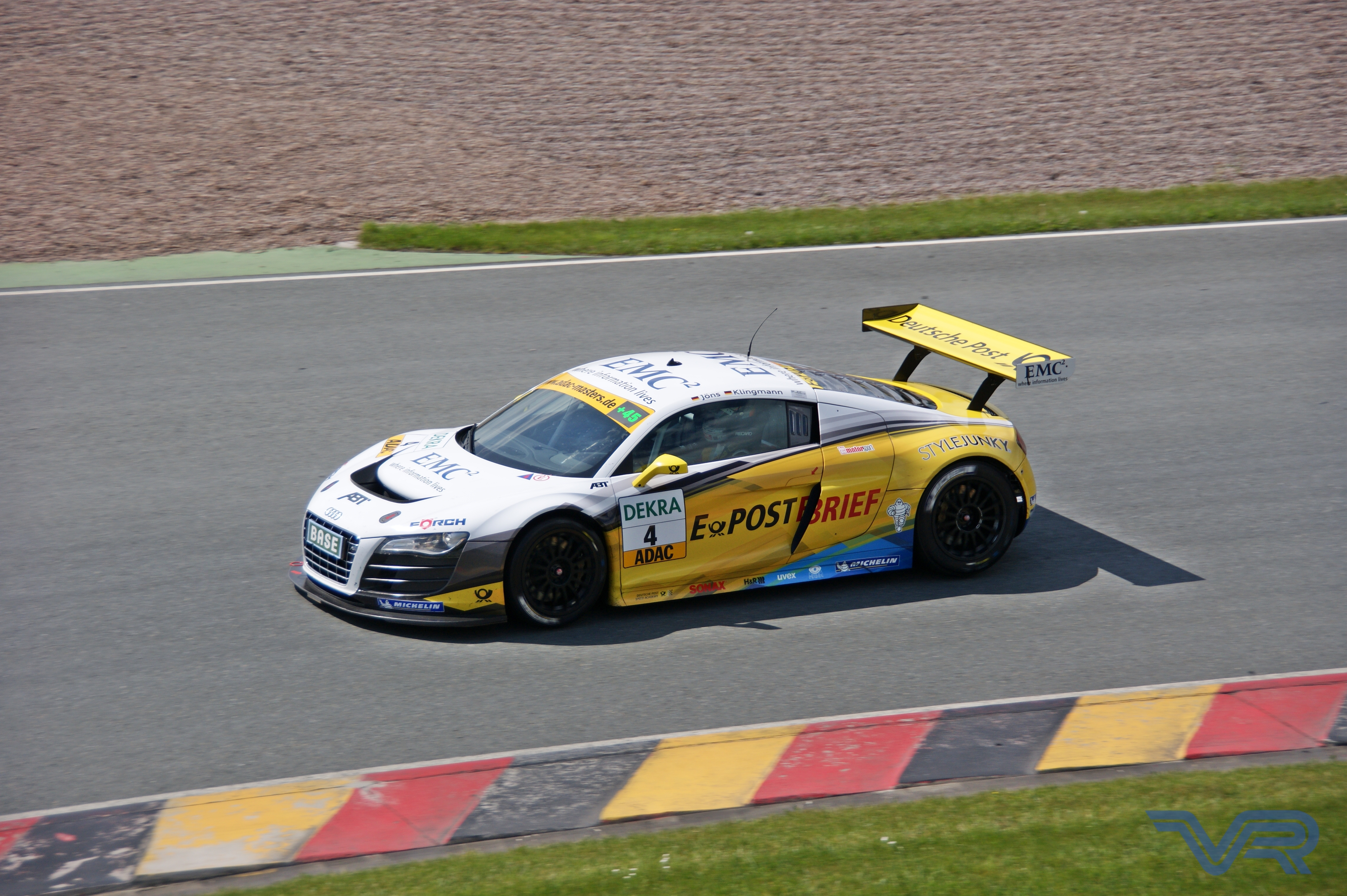
- Jöns in 2011
- Nationality: (Germany) German
- Born: 23 July 1987 (age 39) Wiesbaden, Germany
- Categorisation: FIA Silver

Championship titles
- 2009: VLN Series

Christer Jöns (born 23 July 1987) is a German racing driver who last competed in the Nürburgring Langstrecken-Serie for Car Collection Motorsport in the SP9 Pro-Am class.

An Audi Sport regular in the ADAC GT Masters and 24 Hours of Nürburgring, primarily for Abt Sportsline, Jöns notably won the Bathurst 12 Hour in 2012. He is also the 2009 VLN Series champion.

== Career ==
Jöns began his racing career in 2003, racing in Formula König. After spending two seasons in the series, Jöns switched to the German Formula Three Championship and JMS Motorsport for the next two seasons, most notably finishing runner-up in the Trophy standings in 2005. In 2007, Jöns made his debut at the 24 Hours of Nürburgring, which he won a year later in the V6 class for Sartorius Team Black Falcon.

In 2009, Jöns remained with Black Falcon to mainly race in the SEAT Leon Supercopa Germany, taking four wins and securing runner-up honours in points, as well as winning the VLN Series overall title with the team's BMW 325i. Continuing with the German team for 2010, Jöns primarily raced with them in the VLN Series, as well as racing part-time in the FIA GT3 European Championship. During 2010, Jöns also finished third in the SP9 class of the 24 Hours of Nürburgring and won the Dubai 24 Hour in SP2 for the same team.

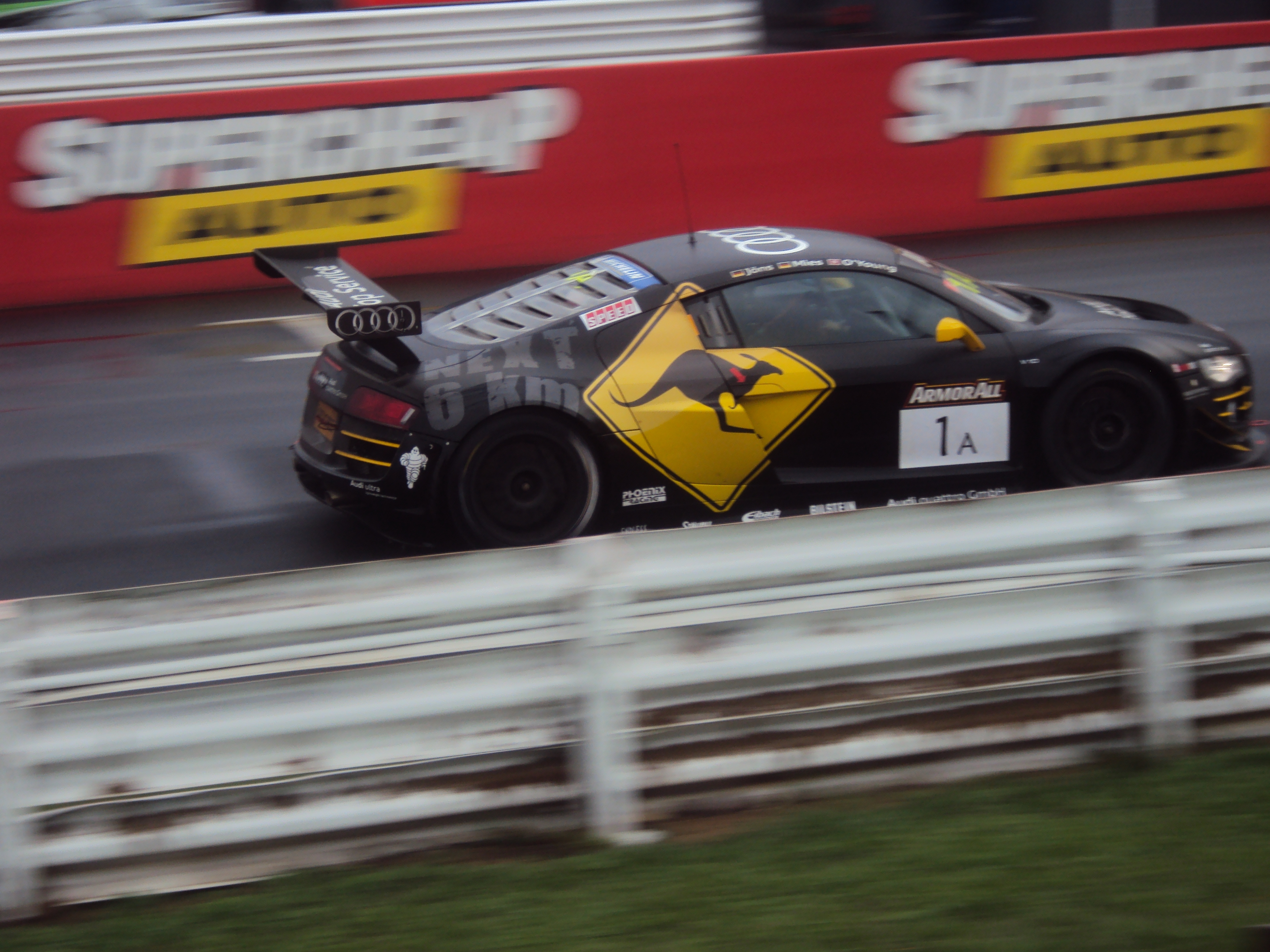
Jöns' Phoenix Racing Audi on its way to victory at the 2012 Bathurst 12 Hour.

Continuing in GT3 competition for the following year, Jöns joined Audi-affiliated Abt Sportsline to race in ADAC GT Masters. In his first season in the series, Jöns scored four podiums, including three second-place finishes, en route to a seventh-place points finish. A part-time campaign in the series then ensued in 2012 with the same team, a year in which he also won the Bathurst 12 Hour outright for Phoenix Racing, sharing an Audi R8 LMS GT3 with Christopher Mies and Darryl O'Young. Returning to full-time ADAC GT Masters competition in 2013 with Abt, Jöns stood on the podium four times, taking a best result of second twice, as he ended the year ninth in points.

Another part-time season then followed in 2014 for Abt, in which Jöns scored a lone podium at Zandvoort, before returning for a full season in 2015 for the same team and finishing seventh overall at the 24 Hours of Nürburgring in Team WRT's Audi R8 LMS. Jöns then remained with Abt for the 2016 ADAC GT Masters season, as the team switched to Bentley machinery. In his fourth full-time season in the series, Jöns took a best result of second in race one at the Red Bull Ring en route to an 11th-place points finish. During 2016, Jöns also finished third at the Dubai 24 Hour in Abt's Audi R8 LMS.

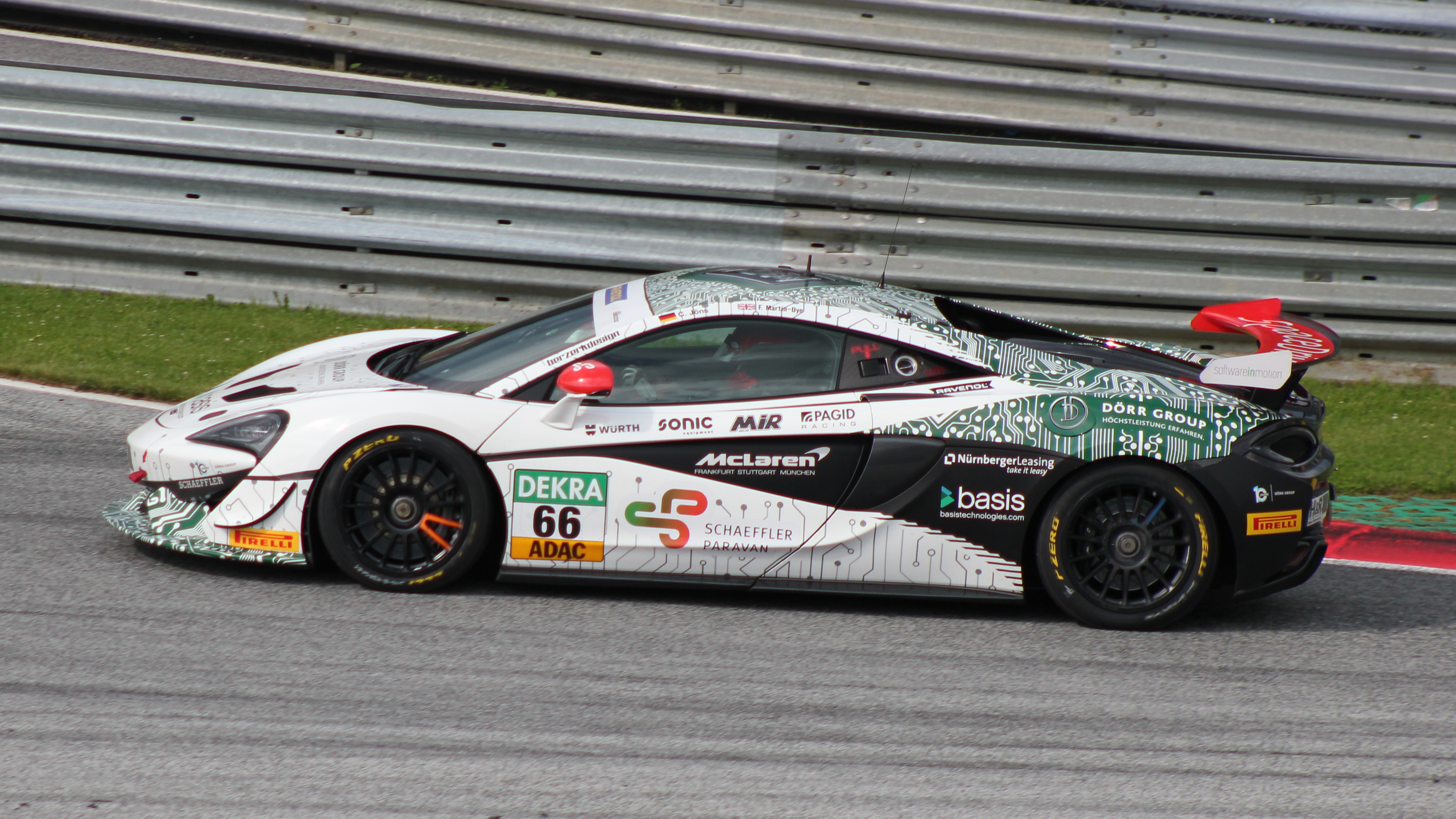
Jöns driving a McLaren in ADAC GT4 at the Red Bull Ring in 2021.

The following year, Jöns won the 24 Hours of Nürburgring in SP9 LG and raced in the 24 Hours of Spa for Bentley Team Abt, before making one-off appearances at the Nürburgring and Dubai in 2018 for Audi-aligned Mücke Motorsport. In 2019, Jöns raced for Nissan-affiliated KCMG at the 24 Hours of Nürburgring, as well as racing for Dörr Motorsport in select rounds of ADAC GT4 Germany, scoring a lone podium at the Nürburgring in the team's McLaren 570S GT4. Guest starts for Dörr in ADAC GT4 Germany then continued the following year, a year in which Jöns also raced at the 24 Hours of Nürburgring and the NLS for Mercedes-linked GetSpeed Performance in SP9. Returning to Dörr Motorsport for the 2021 ADAC GT4 Germany season, Jöns took a best result of second in race one at Sachsenring but wasn't eligible to score points as he was a guest driver.

Following select appearances in GTC Race and GT Cup Europe for Aust Motorsport in 2022, Jöns won the 12 Hours of Estoril for Scherer Sport PHX in GT3 Pro-Am and made a cameo in GT World Challenge Australia for Audi-fielding Melbourne Performance Centre. During 2023, Jöns also made a one-off return to ADAC GT Masters for Mercedes customer team Schnitzelalm Racing. In 2024, Jöns won the 24 Hours of Barcelona in GT3 Pro-Am, as well as finishing second in the Cup2 Pro class at the 24 Hours of Nürburgring for Scherer Sport PHX. The following year, Jöns returned to the German enduro with Hyundai Motorsport, winning it in the TCR class alongside Marc Basseng and Manuel Lauck.

In early 2026, Jöns partook in an official DTM pre-season test at Vallelunga, aboard HGL Racing's Audi R8 LMS Evo II. After that, Jöns competed with Juta Racing at the 24 Hours of Nürburgring and Car Collection Motorsport on a part-time basis in the NLS.

== Karting record ==
=== Karting career summary ===
| Season | Series | Team | Position |
|---|---|---|---|
| 1998 | DMV Landesmeisterschaft Nord – Bambini A | | 7th |
| 2012 | 24 Hours of Leipzig | Team FANIC powered by live-strip.com | 2nd |

== Racing record ==
=== Racing career summary ===
| Season | Series | Team | Races | Wins | Poles | F/Laps | Podiums | Points | Position |
|---|---|---|---|---|---|---|---|---|---|
| 2003 | Formula König | | 12 | 0 | 0 | 0 | 0 | 100 | 14th |
| 2004 | Formula König | WM Sporting | 12 | 0 | 0 | 0 | 7 | 146 | 4th |
| 2005 | German Formula Three Championship – Trophy | JMS Motorsport | 16 | 4 | 5 | 5 | 13 | 116 | **2nd** |
| 2006 | German Formula Three Championship – Trophy | JMS Motorsport | 14 | 0 | 0 | 0 | 2 | 48 | 6th |
| 2007 | 24 Hours of Nürburgring – V5 | Pistenclub e.V. | 1 | 0 | 0 | 0 | 0 | —N/a | 6th |
| 2008 | 24 Hours of Nürburgring – V6 | Sartorius Team Black Falcon | 1 | 1 | 0 | 0 | 1 | —N/a | **1st** |
| 2009 | Dubai 24 Hour – SP2 | Sartorius Team Black Falcon | 1 | 0 | 0 | 0 | 1 | —N/a | **3rd** |
| 2009 | VLN Series | Sartorius Team Black Falcon | 10 | | | | | 76.88 | **1st** |
| 2009 | 24 Hours of Nürburgring – SP7 | Sartorius Team Black Falcon | 1 | 0 | 0 | 0 | 0 | —N/a | 6th |
| 2009 | SEAT Leon Supercopa Germany | Sartorius Team Black Falcon | 16 | 4 | 4 | 10 | 9 | 210 | **2nd** |
| 2010 | Dubai 24 Hour – SP2 | Team Black Falcon | 1 | 1 | 0 | 0 | 1 | —N/a | **1st** |
| 2010 | VLN Series | Black Falcon | | | 1 | | | | |
| 2010 | FIA GT3 European Championship | Black Falcon | 4 | 0 | 0 | 0 | 0 | 16 | 26th |
| 2010 | 24 Hours of Nürburgring – SP9 | Black Falcon | 1 | 0 | 0 | 0 | 1 | —N/a | **3rd** |
| 2011 | ADAC GT Masters | Abt Sportsline | 16 | 0 | 1 | 0 | 4 | 102 | 7th |
| 2011 | 24 Hours of Nürburgring – SP9 | Audi Sport Team Abt Sportsline | 1 | 0 | 0 | 0 | 0 | —N/a | 8th |
| 2012 | Bathurst 12 Hour – A | Phoenix Racing | 1 | 1 | 0 | 0 | 1 | —N/a | **1st** |
| 2012 | ADAC GT Masters | Prosperia uhc speed | 3 | 0 | 1 | 0 | 0 | 4 | 38th |
| 2013 | ADAC GT Masters | Prosperia C. Abt Racing | 16 | 0 | 1 | 1 | 4 | 122 | 9th |
| 2013 | 24 Hours of Nürburgring – SP9 | G-Drive Racing by Phoenix | 1 | 0 | 0 | 0 | 0 | —N/a | 9th |
| 2014 | VLN Series – SP9 | Prosperia C. Abt Racing | 1 | 0 | 0 | 0 | 0 | 5.89 | 55th |
| 2014 | 24 Hours of Nürburgring – SP9 | Prosperia C. Abt Racing | 1 | 0 | 0 | 0 | 0 | —N/a | 14th |
| 2014 | ADAC GT Masters | Prosperia C. Abt Racing | 6 | 0 | 0 | 0 | 1 | 34 | 26th |
| 2015 | ADAC GT Masters | C. Abt Racing | 16 | 0 | 0 | 0 | 0 | 20 | 28th |
| 2015 | 24 Hours of Nürburgring – SP9 | Audi Sport Team WRT | 1 | 0 | 0 | 0 | 0 | —N/a | 7th |
| 2015 | 24H Series – A6 | Simpson Motorsport | 1 | 0 | 0 | 0 | 0 | 0 | NC |
| 2016 | 24H Series – A6-Pro | C. Abt Racing | 1 | 0 | 0 | 0 | 1 | 0 | NC |
| 2016 | Bathurst 12 Hour – AA | Hallmarc Racing | 1 | 0 | 0 | 0 | 0 | —N/a | DNF |
| 2016 | ADAC GT Masters | Bentley Team ABT | 13 | 0 | 0 | 0 | 1 | 54 | 11th |
| 2016 | VLN Series – SP9 | Bentley Abt | 2 | 0 | 0 | 0 | 0 | 0 | NC |
| 2016 | 24 Hours of Nürburgring – SP9 | Bentley Abt | 1 | 0 | 0 | 0 | 0 | —N/a | 16th |
| 2016 | GT Asia Series – GT3 | Bentley Team Absolute | 2 | 0 | 0 | 0 | 0 | 7 | 24th |
| 2017 | VLN Series – SP9 | Bentley Team ABT | 1 | 0 | 0 | 0 | 0 | 0 | NC |
| 2017 | 24 Hours of Nürburgring – SP9 LG | Bentley Team ABT | 1 | 1 | 0 | 0 | 1 | —N/a | **1st** |
| 2017 | Blancpain GT Series Endurance Cup | Bentley Team ABT | 1 | 0 | 0 | 0 | 0 | 0 | NC |
| 2017 | Intercontinental GT Challenge | Bentley Team ABT | 1 | 0 | 0 | 0 | 0 | 0 | NC |
| 2018 | 24H GT Series Continents – A6 | BWT Mücke Motorsport | 1 | 0 | 0 | 0 | 0 | 24 | NC |
| 2018 | VLN Series – SP9 | Audi Sport Team BWT | 1 | 0 | 0 | 0 | 0 | 0 | NC |
| 2018 | ADAC GT Masters | Aust Motorsport | 2 | 0 | 0 | 0 | 0 | 0 | NC |
| 2018 | 24 Hours of Nürburgring – SP9 | Team BWT Mücke Motorsport | 1 | 0 | 0 | 0 | 0 | —N/a | 13th |
| 2019 | VLN Series – SP8T | Schubert Motorsport | 4 | 1 | 0 | 0 | 3 | 24.89 | 5th |
| 2019 | VLN Series – SP9 | KCMG | 2 | 0 | 0 | 0 | 0 | 4.25 | 75th |
| 2019 | 24 Hours of Nürburgring – SP9 | KCMG | 1 | 0 | 0 | 0 | 0 | —N/a | DNF |
| 2019 | DMV Dunlop 60 – Class 5 | Dörr Motorsport | 1 | 0 | 0 | 0 | 1 | 6.25 | 13th |
| 2019 | ADAC GT4 Germany | Dörr Motorsport | 6 | 0 | 0 | 0 | 1 | 27 | 24th |
| 2019 | ADAC GT Masters | EFP Car Collection by TECE | 2 | 0 | 0 | 0 | 0 | 0 | 35th |
| 2020 | ADAC GT4 Germany | Dörr Motorsport | 4 | 0 | 0 | 0 | 0 | 0 | NC† |
| 2020 | Nürburgring Langstrecken-Serie – SP9 | Mercedes-AMG Team GetSpeed | 2 | 0 | 0 | 0 | 0 | 9.88 | 51st |
| 2020 | 24 Hours of Nürburgring – SP9 | GetSpeed Performance | 1 | 0 | 0 | 0 | 0 | —N/a | DNF |
| 2021 | ADAC GT4 Germany | Dörr Motorsport | 10 | 0 | 2 | 0 | 1 | 0 | NC† |
| 2021 | Nürburgring Langstrecken-Serie – SP9 | Audi Sport Team Phoenix | 1 | 0 | 0 | 0 | 0 | 0 | NC |
| 2021 | Nürburgring Langstrecken-Serie – SP9 | Audi Sport Team Car Collection | 1 | 0 | 0 | 0 | 0 | 0 | NC |
| 2021 | 24H GT Series – P4 | Car Collection Motorsport | 1 | 1 | 0 | 0 | 1 | 28 | NC |
| 2022 | GT Cup Open Europe – Pro-Am | Aust Motorsport | 2 | 0 | 0 | 0 | 0 | 0 | NC† |
| 2022–23 | Middle East Trophy – GT3 Pro-Am | Phoenix Racing | 1 | 0 | 0 | 0 | 0 | 28 | NC |
| 2023 | GT World Challenge Australia – GT3 Pro-Am | Melbourne Performance Centre | 2 | 0 | 0 | 0 | 2 | 30 | 15th |
| 2023 | 24H GT Series – GT3 Pro-Am | Scherer Sport PHX | 2 | 1 | 0 | 0 | 2 | 112 | **3rd** |
| 2023 | 24 Hours of Nürburgring – Cup2 Pro | Huber Motorsport | 1 | 0 | 0 | 0 | 0 | —N/a | DNF |
| 2023 | ADAC GT Masters | Schnitzelalm Racing | 2 | 0 | 0 | 0 | 0 | 20 | 25th |
| 2024 | 24 Hours of Nürburgring – Cup2 Pro | Scherer Sport PHX | 1 | 0 | 0 | 0 | 1 | —N/a | **2nd** |
| 2024 | 24H Series – GT3 Pro-Am | Saintéloc Junior Team | 1 | 1 | 0 | 0 | 1 | 60 | 6th |
| 2025 | Nürburgring Langstrecken-Serie – TCR | Hyundai Motorsport | 2 | 2 | 0 | 0 | 2 | 12 | NC |
| 2025 | 24 Hours of Nürburgring – TCR | Hyundai Motorsport | 1 | 1 | 0 | 0 | 1 | —N/a | **1st** |
| 2026 | Nürburgring Langstrecken-Serie – SP9 Pro-Am | Juta Racing | 1 | 0 | 0 | 0 | 0 | 14 | NC |
| 2026 | Nürburgring Langstrecken-Serie – SP9 Pro-Am | Car Collection Motorsport | 2 | 0 | 0 | 0 | 1 | 14 | NC |
| 2026 | 24 Hours of Nürburgring – SP9 Pro-Am | Juta Racing | 1 | 0 | 0 | 0 | 0 | —N/a | 8th |

^{†} As Jöns was a guest driver, he was ineligible to score points.

=== Complete German Formula Three Championship results ===
(key) (Races in bold indicate pole position, races in italics indicate fastest lap)

| Year | Team | 1 | 2 | 3 | 4 | 5 | 6 | 7 | 8 | 9 | 10 | 11 | 12 | 13 | 14 | 15 | 16 | 17 | 18 | 19 | 20 | DC | Points |
|---|---|---|---|---|---|---|---|---|---|---|---|---|---|---|---|---|---|---|---|---|---|---|---|
| 2005 | JMS Motorsport | OSC1; 1 Ret | OSC1; 2; 18 | HOC; 1; 14 | HOC; 2; 11 | SAC; 1; 17 | SAC; 2; 10 | LAU1; 1; 12 | LAU1; 2; 13 | NÜR1; 1; 13 | NÜR1; 2; 9 | NÜR2; 1; 12 | NÜR2; 2; 14 | ASS; 1; 7 | ASS; 2; 12 | LAU2; 1 | LAU2; 2 | OSC2; 1; 13 | OSC2; 2; 14 | | | 16th | 3 |
| 2006 | JMS Motorsport | OSC1; 1 Ret | OSC1; 2; 19 | HOC; 1; 27 | HOC; 2; 16 | LAU1; 1; 13 | LAU1; 2; 14 | NÜR1; 1; 11 | NÜR1; 2; 13 | NÜR2; 1; 18 | NÜR2; 2; 18 | ASS1; 1; 9 | ASS1; 2; 18 | LAU2; 1 | LAU2; 2 | ASS2; 1; 11 | ASS2; 2; 21 | SAL; 1 | SAL; 2 | OSC2; 1 | OSC2; 2 | 26th | 0 |

=== Complete 24 Hours of Nürburgring results ===
| Year | Team | Co-Drivers | Car | Class | Laps | Pos. | Class Pos. |
|---|---|---|---|---|---|---|---|
| 2007 | (Germany) Pistenclub e.V. | (Germany) René Wolff (Germany) Pascal Engel (Germany) Axel Nolde | BMW M3 Coupe | V5 | 92 | 44th | 6th |
| 2008 | (Germany) Sartorius Team Black Falcon | (Germany) Bona Ventura (Germany) Dieter Lehner (Germany) Jürgen Stumpf | BMW M3 E46 | V6 | 134 | 24th | **1st** |
| 2009 | (Germany) Sartorius Team Black Falcon | (Germany) Bona Ventura (Netherlands) Dillon Koster (Italy) Diego Romanini | BMW M3 E92 | SP7 | 110 | 93rd | 6th |
| 2010 | (Germany) Black Falcon | (Republic of Ireland) Sean Paul Breslin (Austria) Johannes Stuck (Germany) Kenneth Heyer | Audi R8 LMS | SP9 | 152 | 5th | **3rd** |
| 2011 | (Germany) Audi Sport Team Abt Sportsline | (Germany) Luca Ludwig (Germany) Christopher Mies (Germany) Christian Abt | Audi R8 LMS | SP9 | 149 | 12th | 8th |
| 2013 | (Russia) G-Drive Racing by Phoenix | (Germany) Frank Biela (Germany) Luca Ludwig (Russia) Roman Rusinov | Audi R8 LMS ultra | SP9 | 86 | 9th | 9th |
| 2014 | (Germany) Prosperia C. Abt Racing GmbH | (Germany) Christopher Mies (Germany) Niclas Kentenich (Germany) Dominik Schwager | Audi R8 LMS ultra | SP9 | 138 | 33rd | 14th |
| 2015 | (Belgium) Audi Sport Team WRT | (Denmark) Nicki Thiim (Germany) Pierre Kaffer | Audi R8 LMS | SP9 | 153 | 7th | 7th |
| 2016 | (Germany) Bentley Abt | (Germany) Christopher Brück (Germany) Marco Holzer (United Kingdom) Steven Kane | Bentley Continental GT3 | SP9 | 155 | 17th | 16th |
| 2017 | (Germany) Bentley Team Abt | (Germany) Christopher Brück (Germany) Christian Menzel (Belgium) Nico Verdonck | Bentley Continental GT3 | SP9 LG | 155 | 15th | **1st** |
| 2018 | (Germany) Team BWT Mücke Motorsport | (Switzerland) Marcel Fässler (Germany) Pierre Kaffer (Germany) Stefan Mücke | Audi R8 LMS | SP9 | 130 | 14th | 13th |
| 2019 | (Hong Kong) KCMG | (Germany) Nico Menzel (Italy) Edoardo Liberati (France) Matthieu Vaxivière | Nissan GT-R Nismo GT3 | SP9 | 65 | DNF | DNF |
| 2020 | (Germany) GetSpeed Performance | (France) Emmanuel Collard (France) François Perrodo (France) Matthieu Vaxivière | Mercedes-AMG GT3 Evo | SP9 | 80 | DNF | DNF |
| 2023 | (Germany) Huber Motorsport | (Germany) Ulrich Berg (Germany) Thomas Kiefer (Germany) Hans Wehrmann | Porsche 992 GT3 Cup | Cup2; Pro | 111 | DNF | DNF |
| 2024 | (Germany) Scherer Sport PHX | (Germany) Thomas Kiefer (Luxembourg) Dylan Pereira (Netherlands) Larry ten Voorde | Porsche 992 GT3 Cup | Cup2; Pro | 48 | 21st | **2nd** |
| 2025 | (South Korea) Hyundai Motorsport | (Germany) Marc Basseng (Germany) Manuel Lauck | Hyundai Elantra N TCR (2024) | TCR | 130 | 23rd | **1st** |

=== Complete FIA GT3 European Championship results ===
(key) (Races in bold indicate pole position; races in italics indicate fastest lap)

| Year | Entrant | Chassis | Engine | 1 | 2 | 3 | 4 | 5 | 6 | 7 | 8 | 9 | 10 | 11 | 12 | Pos. | Points |
|---|---|---|---|---|---|---|---|---|---|---|---|---|---|---|---|---|---|
| 2010 | Black Falcon | Audi R8 LMS | Audi 5.2 L V10 | SIL; 1 | SIL; 2 | BRN; 1 | BRN; 2 | JAR; 1; 4 | JAR; 2; 9 | LEC; 1; 11 | LEC; 2; 9 | ALG; 1 | ALG; 2 | ZOL; 1 | ZOL; 2 | 26th | 16 |

=== Complete ADAC GT Masters results ===
(key) (Races in bold indicate pole position) (Races in italics indicate fastest lap)

| Year | Team | Car | 1 | 2 | 3 | 4 | 5 | 6 | 7 | 8 | 9 | 10 | 11 | 12 | 13 | 14 | 15 | 16 | DC | Points |
|---|---|---|---|---|---|---|---|---|---|---|---|---|---|---|---|---|---|---|---|---|
| 2011 | Abt Sportsline | Audi R8 LMS | OSC; 1; 3 | OSC; 2; 2 | SAC; 1; 2 | SAC; 2; 4 | ZOL; 1; 11 | ZOL; 2 Ret | NÜR; 1; 9 | NÜR; 2; 5 | RBR; 1; 21 | RBR; 2; 11 | LAU; 1; 10 | LAU; 2 Ret | **ASS**; **1**; 2 | **ASS**; **2**; 6 | HOC; 1 Ret | HOC; 2; 30 | 7th | 102 |
| 2012 | Prosperia uhc speed | Audi R8 LMS ultra | **OSC**; **1**; 18 | OSC; 2 Ret | ZAN; 1 DNS | ZAN; 2; 8 | SAC; 1 | SAC; 2 | NÜR; 1 | NÜR; 2 | RBR; 1 | RBR; 2 | LAU; 1 | LAU; 2 | NÜR; 1 | NÜR; 2 | HOC; 1 | HOC; 2 | 38th | 4 |
| 2013 | Prosperia C. Abt Racing | Audi R8 LMS ultra | OSC; 1; 6 | OSC; 2; 6 | SPA; 1; 16 | SPA; 2; 7 | SAC; 1; 11 | SAC; 2; 7 | NÜR; 1; 2 | NÜR; 2; 9 | RBR; 1; 7 | RBR; 2; 15 | LAU; 1; 5 | LAU; 2; 3 | SVK; 1; 2 | **SVK**; **2**; 5 | HOC; 1 Ret | HOC; 2; 3 | 9th | 122 |
| 2014 | Prosperia C. Abt Racing | Audi R8 LMS ultra | OSC; 1 | OSC; 2 | ZAN; 1; 2 | ZAN; 2; 4 | LAU; 1 | LAU; 2 | RBR; 1 | RBR; 2 | SLO; 1 | SLO; 2 | NÜR; 1; 8 | NÜR; 2; 18 | SAC; 1 | SAC; 2 | HOC; 1; 15 | HOC; 2; 14 | 26th | 34 |
| 2015 | C. Abt Racing | Audi R8 LMS ultra | OSC; 1; 18 | OSC; 2; 12 | RBR; 1; 14 | RBR; 2 Ret | SPA; 1; 13 | SPA; 2; 9 | LAU; 1; 14 | LAU; 2 Ret | NÜR; 1; 17 | NÜR; 2; 6 | SAC; 1; 7 | SAC; 2 Ret | ZAN; 1; 9 | ZAN; 2; 14 | HOC; 1; 10 | HOC; 2; 12 | 28th | 20 |
| 2016 | Bentley Team Abt | Bentley Continental GT3 | OSC; 1; 14 | OSC; 2; 23 | SAC; 1; 27 | SAC; 2; 4 | LAU; 1; 30 | LAU; 2; 17 | RBR; 1; 2 | RBR; 2; 7 | NÜR; 1 Ret | NÜR; 2; 18 | ZAN; 1; 6 | ZAN; 2 DNS | HOC; 1; 5 | HOC; 2; 16 | | | 11th | 54 |
| 2018 | Aust Motorsport | Audi R8 LMS | OSC; 1 | OSC; 2 | MST; 1; 13 | MST; 2; 25 | RBR; 1 | RBR; 2 | NÜR; 1 | NÜR; 2 | ZAN; 1 | ZAN; 2 | SAC; 1 | SAC; 2 | HOC; 1 | HOC; 2 | | | NC | 0 |
| 2019 | EFP Car Collection by TECE | Audi R8 LMS Evo | OSC; 1 | OSC; 2 | MST; 1 | MST; 2 | RBR; 1 | RBR; 2 | ZAN; 1 | ZAN; 2 | NÜR; 1 | NÜR; 2 | HOC; 1 | HOC; 2 | SAC; 1; 21 | SAC; 2; 20 | | | NC | 0 |
| 2023 | Schnitzelalm Racing | Mercedes-AMG GT3 Evo | HOC1; 1 | HOC1; 2 | NOR; 1 | NOR; 2 | NÜR; 1 | NÜR; 2 | SAC; 1 | SAC; 2 | RBR; 1 | RBR; 2 | HOC2; 1; 5 | HOC2; 2; 7 | | | | | 25th | 20 |

=== Complete GT World Challenge Europe results ===
==== GT World Challenge Europe Endurance Cup ====
(key) (Races in bold indicate pole position; results in italics indicate fastest lap)

| Year | Team | Car | Class | 1 | 2 | 3 | 4 | 5 | 6 | 7 | Pos. | Points |
|---|---|---|---|---|---|---|---|---|---|---|---|---|
| 2017 | Bentley Team Abt | Bentley Continental GT3 | Pro | MNZ | SIL | LEC | SPA; 6H; 16 | SPA; 12H; 18 | SPA; 24H; Ret | CAT | NC | 0 |

=== Complete ADAC GT4 Germany results ===
(key) (Races in bold indicate pole position) (Races in italics indicate fastest lap)

| Year | Team | Car | 1 | 2 | 3 | 4 | 5 | 6 | 7 | 8 | 9 | 10 | 11 | 12 | DC | Points |
|---|---|---|---|---|---|---|---|---|---|---|---|---|---|---|---|---|
| 2019 | Dörr Motorsport | McLaren 570S GT4 | OSC; 1 | OSC; 2 | RBR; 1 | RBR; 2 | ZAN; 1 | ZAN; 2 | NÜR; 1; 2 | NÜR; 2; 12 | HOC; 1; 14 | HOC; 2; 18 | SAC; 1; 21 | SAC; 2; 18 | 24th | 27 |
| 2020 | Dörr Motorsport | McLaren 570S GT4 | NÜR; 1 | NÜR; 2 | HOC; 1; 7 | HOC; 2 Ret | SAC; 1 | SAC; 2 | RBR; 1; 6 | RBR; 2; 4 | LAU; 1 | LAU; 2 | OSC; 1 | OSC; 2 | NC† | 0† |
| 2021 | Dörr Motorsport | McLaren 570S GT4 | OSC1; 1; 8 | OSC1; 2; 4 | **RBR**; **1** Ret | **RBR**; **2**; 21 | ZAN; 1 | ZAN; 2 | SAC; 1; 2 | SAC; 2; 4 | HOC; 1; 13 | HOC; 2; 15 | NÜR; 1 Ret | NÜR; 2; 26 | NC† | 0† |
