= Tamás Révész =

Hungarian American photographer

Tamás Révész (born 1946) is a Hungarian American photographer. He is head of photojournalism at BKF University of Applied Sciences (Budapest, Hungary).

Révész was born in Budapest, Hungary in 1946.

His photography exhibition, "New York", was endorsed by the New York City Sister City Program.

== Bibliography ==
His most recent published book is New York.
