= Ford Mustang FR500 =

Race variant of the Ford Mustang

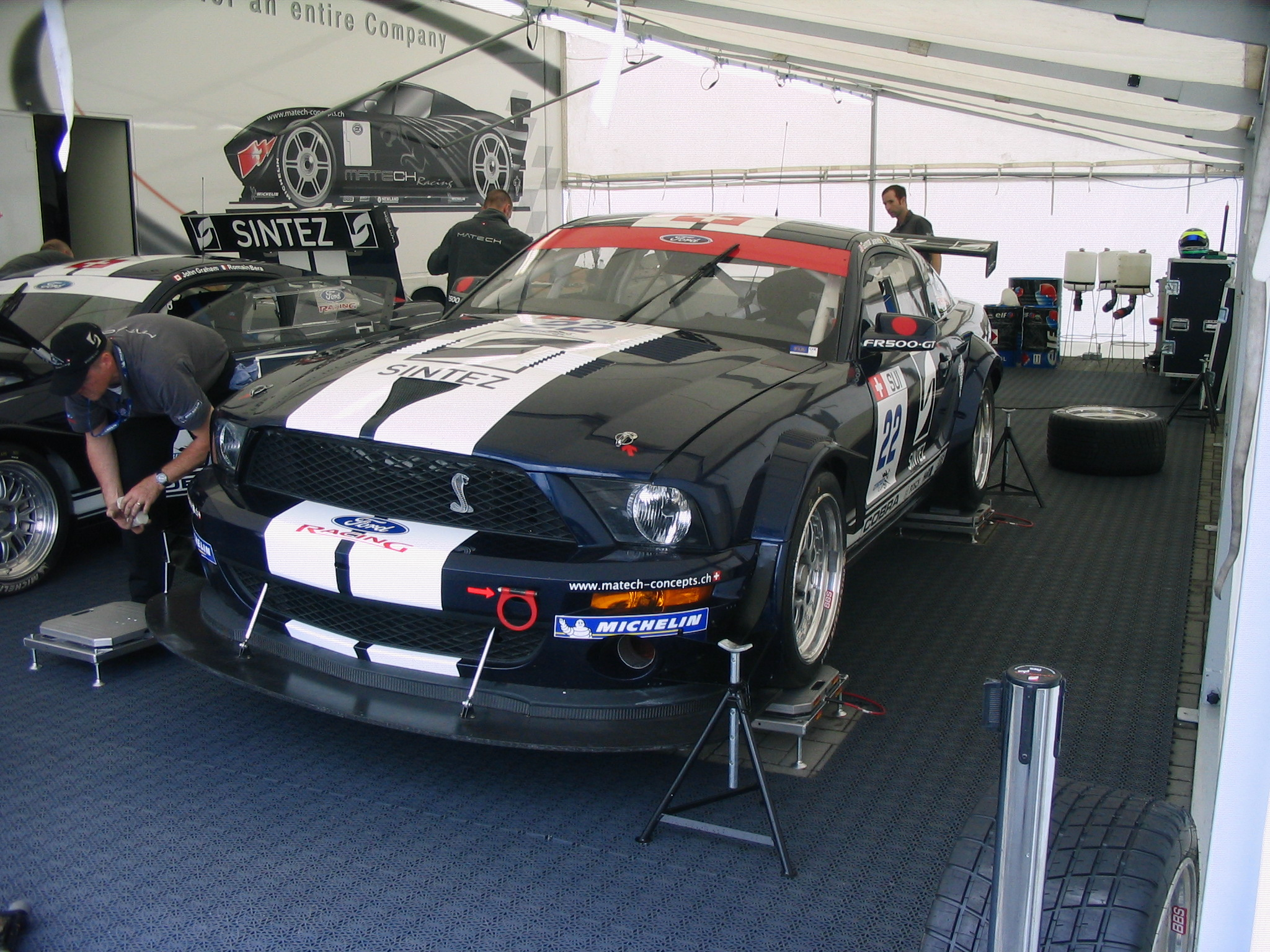
FR500GT at the FIA GT3 European Championship 2008

The Ford Racing Mustang FR500 is a highly tuned race variant of the Ford Mustang, featuring a V8 engine. It is a turn key race car not designed for public roads. Each FR500 model is built with a unique Ford Racing number, instead of a DOT VIN. Each is built to order by Ford Racing. All FR500s are made at the same Flat Rock, Michigan plant as the standard Mustang.

Ford announced that it would continue to offer FR500 models in 2010.

== Concept (1999) ==
The concept vehicle was developed by Dan Davis and the Special Vehicles Team (SVT) at Ford Motor Company. It has a top speed of 281.6 km/h (175.0 mph). The car was based on the 1999 SVT Cobra, but did have some changes compared to the base car.

=== Engine ===
The slightly larger than stock (4997 cc) engine was modified by a variable intake head, later available as an aftermarket part called the FR500 cylinder head. The exhaust was a special exhaust which kept the 2.5" diameter, but had a second crossover in the shape of an X-pipe behind the rear axle just before the exhaust tips. The mufflers had flaps, which opened under high pressure, thus making the exhaust more free flowing. The exhaust was also later sold as an aftermarket part by Ford Racing as the M-5230-M58 kit. Altogether, the engine modifications resulted in a horsepower increase to 415 from the stock 320 in the Cobra engine.

=== Drivetrain etc. ===
The FR500 concept came with a six-speed Tremec T56 transmission as compared to the 1999-standard T45 5 speed. Also, the wheelbase of the car was 5 inches larger than standard, which was due to the fact that the front axle had been moved forward by 5 inches. The car also had 14" Brembo brake discs with 4 piston calipers at the front end, Lincoln LS calipers with 13" rotors on the rear, and sported the so-called FR500 18" wheels, which also became available as an addon later.

=== Exterior ===
The FR500 had a special carbon fiber hood and front fascia. The hood was more aerodynamic than the standard Cobra/GT one, and did not feature an open hole between the lights. Instead, the air for cooling and the engine was taken from under the bumper. The car also came with special C-pillar covers, giving a sleeker appearance and changing the shape of the rear windows, close to the shape that was later resurrected for the 2001 Bullit Mustang. The longer wheelbase also mandated special carbon fiber fenders. Finally, as an aerodynamic touch, the side scoops were shaved.

== Road Racing ==
=== FR500C ===
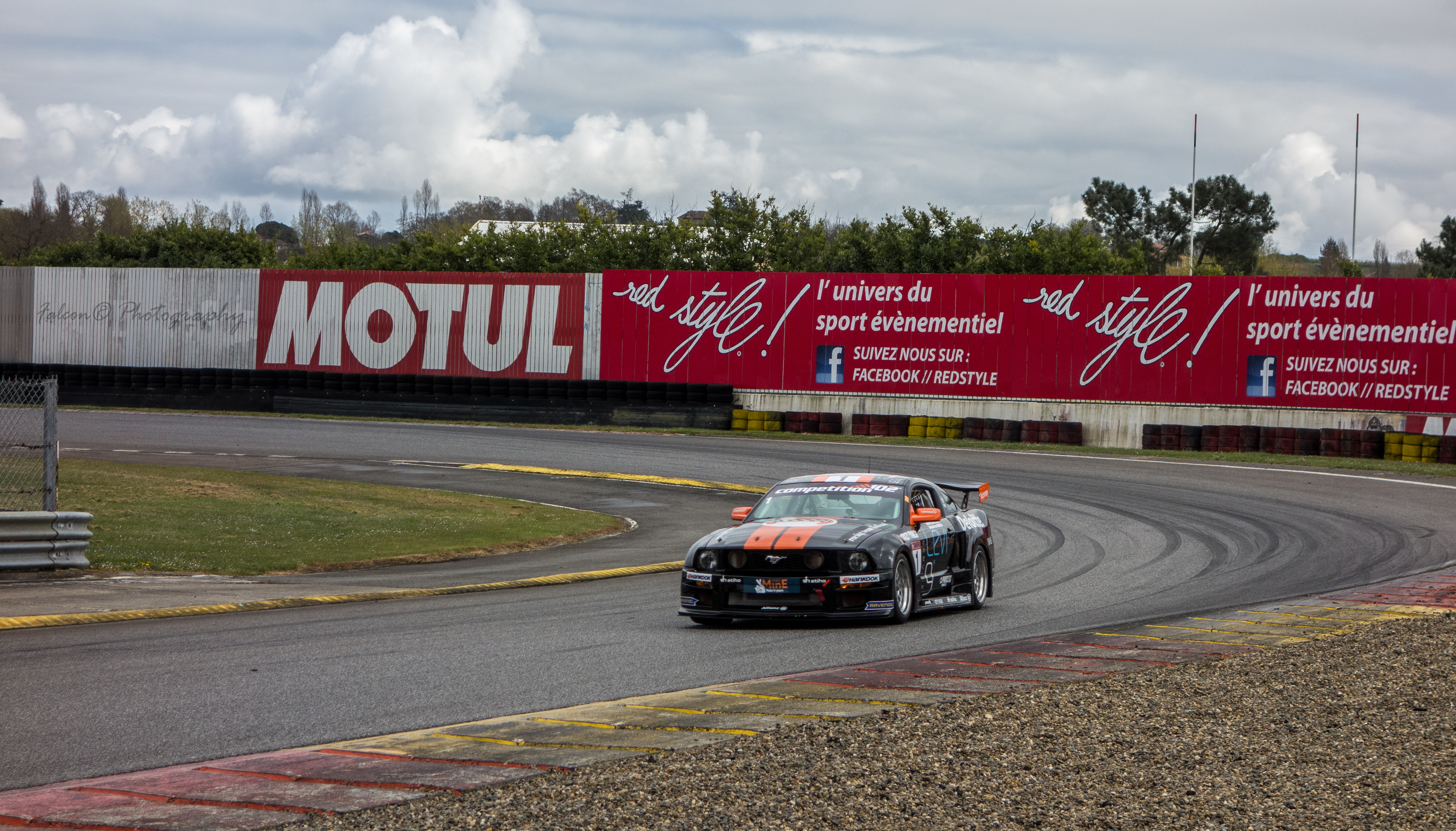
Ford Mustang FR500C GT4

Powered by a 5.0L "Cammer R50" engine, it delivers 420 hp (313 kW). It includes a Tremec T56 6-speed transmission and other race-spec parts including a Grand Am-spec rollcage. It is permitted to be used in the Grand Am Grand Sport (GS) Class.

The FR500C can either be obtained as a turnkey costing $125,000 or by modding an existing Mustang GT with specified parts from Ford Racing.

It is also known by its nickname "Boy Racer", assigned by Ford executives.

This model won the manufacturers title in the Koni Challenge racing series in 2005 & 2008. This was after several attempts to slow the car down- such as a rearend gears change and additional weight.

=== FR500S ===
Powered by Ford's 4.6L V8 engine, it is rated at 325HP. The FR500S is often slotted in between the FR500C ('Boy Racer') and FR500GT ('Man Racer'). The car was designed by both Ford Racing and Miller Motorsports for the Ford Racing Mustang Challenge series (a racing series founded by Larry Miller). The car features similar aerodynamic parts like those used on the FR500GT, but uses a DOT approved racing tire- BFGoodrich g-Force R1.

With the end of the Ford Racing Mustang Challenge, the FR500S has been homologated for competition in the SCCA World Challenge GTS class.

=== FR500GT ===
Codenamed Man Racer, the 5.0L V8 engine is rated at 550 hp (410 kW). This model features all of the features of a full race car, from heavily modified suspension to the large aerodynamic parts (which are effective). It also uses a 5.0L V8 engine built by Roush/Yates.

== Drag Racing ==
=== FR500CJ ===
The FR500CJ (Cobra Jet) was released in 2008, and was built to commemorate the 40th Anniversary of Ford winning NHRA Winternationals with 1968 Cobra Jet Mustang. Designed for Drag Strip use, the newer Cobra Jet features a supercharged 5.4L V8 400 hp (298 kW) but with the Whipple Blower makes about 900 HP engine with a 6-speed manual or 3-speed automatic transmission, one-piece driveshaft, a single-hoop driveshaft loop, Ford 9 inch rear axle, special rear control arms and anti-roll bar, Ford Racing adjustable dampeners and a drag race spring kit. Engine enhancements include the deletion of the A/C and the addition of a cold air intake, bigger throttle body, a crankshaft dampener and long-tube stainless-steel headers. The car weighs 3,300 lb (1,500 kg).

The Prototype #1 vehicle was sold in 2009 Barrett-Jackson Scottsdale auction for winning bid price of $375,000.

== Variants ==
=== FR500C GT4 ===
A variant based on Mustang FR500C, homologated for SRO GT4 competition. Essentially the same car as the FR500C, it has a few changes (none are aerodynamic) to make it legal for GT4 competition.

=== FR500C Salt Flats Racer ===
Paul's High Performance and Ford Racing built a Salt Flat Racer from a FR500C. This one is powered by the Ford GT's 5.4L engine, fueled by E85 fuel. At the Bonneville Salt Flats this car reached 251 mph (404 km/h).

=== FR500C GT ===
Homologated for the 2007 season, the Mustang FR500C GT is designed to compete in the FIA GT3 European Championship series. The 5.0L V8 engine is rated to produce 550 hp (410 kW) at 7200 rpm and 570 N⋅m (420 lb⋅ft) at 6000 rpm torque.

== Parts ==
=== Performance parts ===
In addition to turn key race cars, Ford Racing also offers parts to convert stock Mustangs into race models.
