= 2003 Porsche Carrera Cup Germany =

Motor racing competition

Seasons
- ← 2002 2004 →

The 2003 Porsche Carrera Cup Deutschland season was the 18th German Porsche Carrera Cup season. It began on 26 April at Hockenheim and finished on 4 October at the same circuit, after nine rounds. It ran as a support championship for the 2003 DTM season. Frank Stippler won the championship by 10 points.

== Teams and drivers ==
Team	No.	Drivers	Rounds
(Germany) UPS Porsche Junior Team	1	(Germany) Mike Rockenfeller	All
(Germany) UPS Porsche Junior Team	2	(United States) Patrick Long	All
(Germany) EMC Carsport Racing	3	(Germany) Wolf Henzler	All
(Germany) EMC Carsport Racing	4	(France) Romain Dumas	All
(Germany) PZM Team Farnbacher	5	(Germany) Frank Stippler	All
(Germany) PZM Team Farnbacher	6	(Germany) Sandy Grau	All
(Germany) PZM Team Farnbacher	24	(Germany) Sebastian Zollhöfer	All
(Germany) PZM Team Farnbacher	66	(Germany) Dominik Farnbacher	5
(Germany) Team HP Phoenix PZK	7	(Germany) Pierre Kaffer	1–6, 8
(Germany) Team HP Phoenix PZK	7	(Netherlands) Patrick Huisman	7
(Germany) Team HP Phoenix PZK	7	(Germany) Timo Bernhard	9
(Germany) Team HP Phoenix PZK	8	(Australia) Alex Davison	All
(Germany) Land Motorsport PZ Siegen	9	(Germany) Roland Asch	All
(Germany) Land Motorsport PZ Siegen	10	(Germany) Albert Daffner	All
(Germany) Land Motorsport PZ Siegen	16	(Germany) Christian Land	4, 6, 9
(Germany) Land Motorsport PZ Siegen	16	(Germany) Marc Basseng	7
(Germany) Land Motorsport PZ Siegen	16	(Germany) Tobias Pfister	8
(Germany) Land Motorsport PZ Siegen	20	(Lithuania) Alfredas Kudla	2–3, 5–7, 9
(Germany) IBEX AG/PZ Olympiapark/Herberth Motorsport	11	(Germany) Alfred Renauer	All
(Germany) IBEX AG/PZ Olympiapark/Herberth Motorsport	12	(Germany) Robert Renauer	All
(Germany) IBEX AG/PZ Olympiapark/Herberth Motorsport	26	(Switzerland) Simon Fabian Willner	3–9
(Germany) Tolimit Motorsport	14	(Germany) Christian Menzel	All
(Germany) Tolimit Motorsport	15	(Germany) Klaus Graf	All
(Germany) Tolimit Motorsport	31	(Germany) Maik Heupel	9
(Germany) MRS-Team PZM	17	(Germany) Günther Blieninger	1–5
(Germany) MRS-Team PZM	17	(Russia) Oleg Kesselman	9
(Germany) MRS-Team PZM	18	(Germany) Sebastian Grunert	1–5
(Germany) MRS-Team PZM	18	(Denmark) Kurt Thiim	6–9
(Germany) MRS-Team PZM	34	(Germany) Thomas Messer	9
(Germany) Schnabl Engineering	19	(Germany) Jörg Hardt	All
(Germany) Eichin Racing PZ Koblenz	21	(United Kingdom) Adam Blair	1–7, 9
(Germany) Eichin Racing PZ Koblenz	22	(Germany) Hans Fertl	5
(Germany) Eichin Racing PZ Koblenz	22	(Netherlands) Donny Crevels	6
(Germany) Knüpfing Motorsport - PZ Bayreuth	23	(Germany) Markus Lungstrass	1–3
(Germany) Knüpfing Motorsport - PZ Bayreuth	23	(Germany) Jochen Land	5
(Germany) Knüpfing Motorsport - PZ Bayreuth	23	(Netherlands) Paulien Zwaart	8
(Italy) Federico Borrett	30	(Italy) Federico Borrett	2
(Germany) Arkenau Motorsport	33	(Germany) Oliver Freymuth	6
(Netherlands) Team Bleekemolen	35	(Netherlands) Michael Bleekemolen	8
(Netherlands) Team Bleekemolen	36	(Netherlands) Evert Kroon	8

== Race calendar and results ==
Round	Circuit	Date	Pole position	Fastest lap	Winning driver	Winning team
1	(Germany) Hockenheimring	26 April	(Germany) Frank Stippler	(Germany) Pierre Kaffer	(France) Romain Dumas	(Germany) EMC Carsport Racing
2	(Italy) Adria Raceway	10 May	(Germany) Frank Stippler	(Germany) Wolf Henzler	(Germany) Frank Stippler	(Germany) PZM Team Farnbacher
3	(Germany) Nürburgring Short	24 May	(Germany) Christian Menzel	(Germany) Mike Rockenfeller	(Germany) Frank Stippler	(Germany) PZM Team Farnbacher
4	(Germany) EuroSpeedway Lausitz	8 June	(Germany) Frank Stippler	(Germany) Wolf Henzler	(France) Romain Dumas	(Germany) EMC Carsport Racing
5	(Germany) Norisring	21 June	(United States) Patrick Long	(United States) Patrick Long	(United States) Patrick Long	(Germany) UPS Porsche Junior Team
6	(Germany) Nürburgring Short	16 August	(Germany) Klaus Graf	(United States) Patrick Long	(Germany) Wolf Henzler	(Germany) EMC Carsport Racing
7	(Austria) A1-Ring	5 September	(Germany) Mike Rockenfeller	(Germany) Christian Menzel	(Germany) Mike Rockenfeller	(Germany) UPS Porsche Junior Team
8	(Netherlands) Zandvoort	20 September	(Germany) Klaus Graf	(France) Romain Dumas	(Germany) Frank Stippler	(Germany) PZM Team Farnbacher
9	(Germany) Hockenheimring	4 October	(Germany) Christian Menzel	(Germany) Klaus Graf	(France) Romain Dumas	(Germany) EMC Carsport Racing
