= 2004 Porsche Carrera Cup Germany =

Motor racing competition

Seasons
- ← 2003 2005 →

The 2004 Porsche Carrera Cup Deutschland season was the 19th German Porsche Carrera Cup season. It began on 18 April at Hockenheim and finished on 3 October at the same circuit, after nine rounds. It ran as a support championship for the 2004 DTM season. Mike Rockenfeller won the championship by 21 points.

== Teams and drivers ==
Team	No.	Drivers	Rounds
(Germany) UPS Porsche Junior Team	1	(Germany) Mike Rockenfeller	All
(Germany) UPS Porsche Junior Team	2	(Germany) Christian Mamerow	All
(Germany) EMC ARAXA Racing	3	(Germany) Wolf Henzler	All
(Germany) EMC ARAXA Racing	4	(Germany) Jörg Hardt	All
(Germany) Eichin Racing PZ Freiburg	5	(Switzerland) Simon Fabian Willner	1–4
(Germany) Eichin Racing PZ Freiburg	5	(Germany) Dominik Farnbacher	5, 7–9
(Germany) Eichin Racing PZ Freiburg	6	(Germany) Alexander Roloff	All
(Germany) MRS PC-Service-Team	7	(Germany) Ronny Melkus	1–3
(Germany) MRS PC-Service-Team	7	(Germany) Marc Walz	4
(Germany) MRS PC-Service-Team	7	(Italy) Ivano Giuliani	5
(Germany) MRS PC-Service-Team	7	(Germany) Marco Seefried	6
(Germany) Yarpivo Racing MRS	8	(Russia) Oleg Kesselman	1–7, 9
(Germany) Land Motorsport-PZ Koblenz	9	(France) Nicolas Armindo	All
(Germany) Land Motorsport-PZ Koblenz	10	(Germany) Hendrik Vieth	2–8
(Germany) Land Motorsport-PZ Koblenz	10	(Germany) Jochen Land	9
(Germany) PZ Olympiapark Herberth Motorsport	11	(Germany) Alfred Renauer	All
(Germany) PZ Olympiapark Herberth Motorsport	12	(Germany) Robert Renauer	All
(Netherlands) Jetstream Motorsport	14	(Netherlands) Simon Frederiks	7
(Netherlands) Jetstream Motorsport	15	(Netherlands) Marcel Kesseler	7
(Germany) Schnabl Engineering PZ Trier	18	(Germany) Christopher Brück	1–8
(Germany) Schnabl Engineering PZ Trier	18	(Germany) Roland Asch	9
(Germany) Schnabl Engineering PZ Trier	19	(Germany) Thomas Riethmüller	All
(Switzerland) Carsport Racing Swiss	20	(Switzerland) Marc Benz	1–4
Podium MS Porsche Sweden	22	(Sweden) Robin Rudholm	9
Podium MS Porsche Sweden	23	(Sweden) Fredrik Ros	9
Podium MS Porsche Sweden	24	(Sweden) Nicklas Karlsson	9
(Germany) Mamerow Racing PZ Essen	25	(Austria) Hannes Lachinger	All
(Germany) ARAXA Buchbinder Racing	27	(Germany) Christoph Langen	1–3, 6
(Germany) ARAXA Buchbinder Racing	27	(Germany) Marc Warnecke	4–5
(Germany) JvG Racing	30	(Germany) Marco Seefried	7–9
(Netherlands) Team Bleekemolen	31	(Netherlands) Michael Bleekemolen	4, 7
(Netherlands) Team Bleekemolen	32	(Netherlands) Sebastiaan Bleekemolen	4, 7
(Austria) Walter Lechner Racing School Team	33	(Austria) Marco Schärf	7–9
(Germany) MRP Motorsport	34	(Germany) Michael Raja	6–7, 9
(Turkey) Attempto Racing	35	(Turkey) Arkin Aka	6, 9
(Germany) TLM Lauderbach Motorsport	36	(Germany) Stefan Neuberger	7
(Germany) TLM Lauderbach Motorsport	36	(Germany) Marco Hartung	8–9
(Germany) Tolimit Motorsport	39	(Germany) Christian Menzel	All
(Germany) Tolimit Motorsport	46	(Austria) Richard Lietz	All
(Germany) Infineon – Team Farnbacher	65	(Germany) Hermann Speck	4
(Germany) Infineon – Team Farnbacher	66	(Germany) Dominik Farnbacher	4

== Race calendar and results ==
Round	Circuit	Date	Pole position	Fastest lap	Winning driver	Winning team
1	(Germany) Hockenheimring	18 April	(Germany) Mike Rockenfeller	(Germany) Jörg Hardt	(Germany) Mike Rockenfeller	(Germany) UPS Porsche Junior Team
2	(Italy) Adria Raceway	16 May	(Germany) Jörg Hardt	(Germany) Christopher Brück	(Germany) Wolf Henzler	(Germany) EMC ARAXA Racing
3	(Germany) EuroSpeedway Lausitz	6 June	(Germany) Wolf Henzler	(Austria) Richard Lietz	(Germany) Wolf Henzler	(Germany) EMC ARAXA Racing
4	(Germany) Norisring	27 June	(Germany) Mike Rockenfeller	(Germany) Wolf Henzler	(Germany) Mike Rockenfeller	(Germany) UPS Porsche Junior Team
5	(Germany) Nürburgring Short	1 August	(Germany) Mike Rockenfeller	(Germany) Christopher Brück	(Germany) Mike Rockenfeller	(Germany) UPS Porsche Junior Team
6	(Germany) Oschersleben	8 August	(Germany) Mike Rockenfeller	(Germany) Mike Rockenfeller	(Germany) Mike Rockenfeller	(Germany) UPS Porsche Junior Team
7	(Netherlands) Zandvoort	5 September	(Germany) Wolf Henzler	(Germany) Mike Rockenfeller	(Germany) Wolf Henzler	(Germany) EMC ARAXA Racing
8	(Czech Republic) Brno	19 September	(Germany) Mike Rockenfeller	(Germany) Mike Rockenfeller	(Germany) Mike Rockenfeller	(Germany) UPS Porsche Junior Team
9	(Germany) Hockenheimring	23 October	(Germany) Wolf Henzler	(Germany) Jörg Hardt	(Germany) Jörg Hardt	(Germany) EMC ARAXA Racing
