= Porsche Carrera Cup Germany =

Racing series in Germany

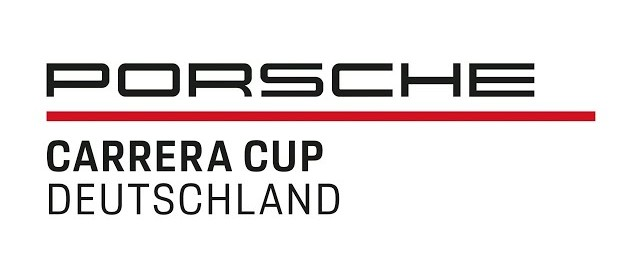
- Category: One-make racing by Porsche
- Country: Germany
- Inaugural season: 1986
- Constructors: Porsche
- Tyre suppliers: Michelin
- Drivers' champion: (South Africa) Keagan Masters
- Teams' champion: (Germany) Proton Competition
- Official website: porsche.com/germany

The Porsche Carrera Cup Germany, (currently known as Porsche SIXT Carrera Cup Deutschland; known as Porsche 944 Turbo Cup between 1986–1989) is a one-make racing series by Porsche based in Germany.

== Champions ==
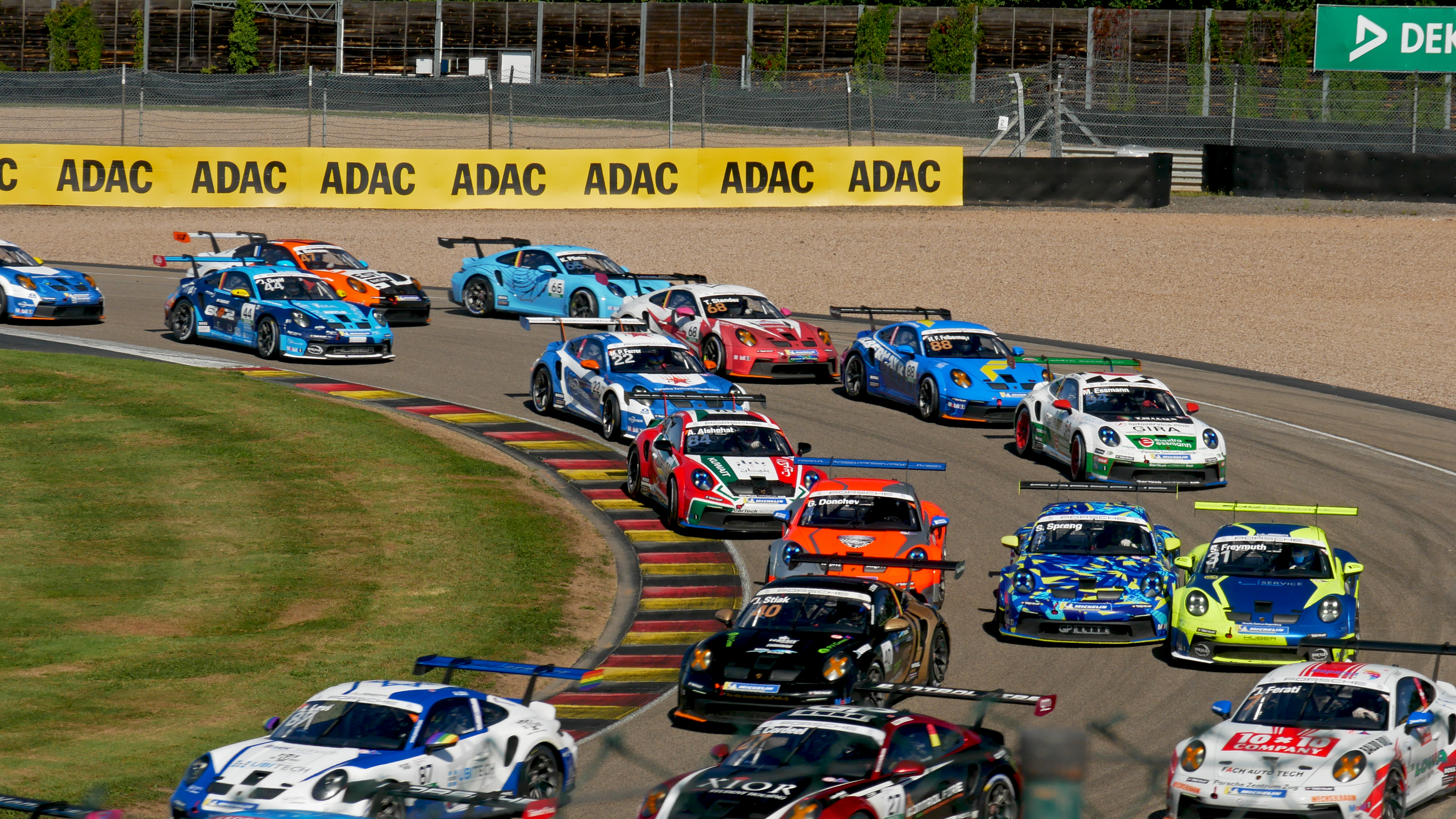
2023 Porsche Carrera Cup Germany field at the Sachsenring.

Season	Champion	Team Champion
1986	(Germany) Joachim Winkelhock	(Germany) Winkelhock Motorsport
1987	(Germany) Roland Asch	(Germany) Max Moritz Racing Team
1988	(Germany) Roland Asch	(Germany) Strähle Autosport
1989	(Germany) Roland Asch	(Germany) Strähle Autosport
1990	(Germany) Olaf Manthey	(Germany) Team Derkum
1991	(Germany) Roland Asch	(Germany) Strähle Autosport
1992	(Germany) Uwe Alzen	(Germany) Porsche Zentrum Koblenz
1993	(Germany) Wolfgang Land	(Germany) Roock Racing
1994	(Germany) Bernd Mayländer	(Germany) Porsche Zentrum Koblenz
1995	(Germany) Harald Grohs	(Germany) Oberbayern Motorsport
1996	(Germany) Ralf Kelleners	(Germany) Porsche Zentrum Koblenz
1997	(Germany) Wolfgang Land	(Germany) Porsche Zentrum Freiburg/Eichin Racing
1998	(Germany) Dirk Müller	(Germany) UPS Porsche Junior Team
1999	(Germany) Lucas Luhr	(Germany) UPS Porsche Junior Team
2000	(Germany) Jörg Bergmeister	(Germany) UPS Porsche Junior Team
2001	(Germany) Timo Bernhard	(Germany) UPS Porsche Junior Team
2002	(Germany) Marc Lieb	(Germany) UPS Porsche Junior Team
2003	(Germany) Frank Stippler	(Germany) UPS Porsche Junior Team
2004	(Germany) Mike Rockenfeller	(Germany) UPS Porsche Junior Team
2005	(Germany) Christian Menzel	(Germany) Team HP-PZ Koblenz (tolimit Motorsport)
2006	(Germany) Dirk Werner	(Germany) HP Team Herberth
2007	(Germany) Uwe Alzen	(Germany) Herberth Motorsport
2008	(Germany) René Rast	(Germany) UPS Porsche Junior Team
2009	(Germany) Thomas Jäger	(Germany) MS Racing PZ Hamburg-NW
2010	(France) Nicolas Armindo	(Germany) Hermes Attempto Racing
2011	(United Kingdom) Nick Tandy	(Germany) Team Deutsche Post by Tolimit
2012	(Germany) René Rast	(Germany) Team Deutsche Post by Tolimit
2013	(France) Kévin Estre	(Germany) Attempto Racing
2014	(Austria) Philipp Eng	(Austria) Walter Lechner Racing
2015	(Austria) Philipp Eng	(Germany) Deutsche Post by Project 1
2016	(Germany) Sven Müller	(Germany) Konrad Motorsport
2017	(Norway) Dennis Olsen	(Germany) Konrad Motorsport
2018	(Austria) Thomas Preining	(Austria) BWT Lechner Racing
2019	(France) Julien Andlauer	(Austria) BWT Lechner Racing
2020	(Netherlands) Larry ten Voorde	(Germany) Nebulus Racing By Huber
2021	(Netherlands) Larry ten Voorde	(Netherlands) Team GP Elite
2022	(Germany) Laurin Heinrich	(Germany) SSR Performance
2023	(Netherlands) Larry ten Voorde	(Netherlands) Team GP Elite
2024	(Netherlands) Larry ten Voorde	(Netherlands) Team GP Elite
2025	(Netherlands) Robert de Haan	(Germany) Proton Huber Competition
2026	(South Africa) Keagan Masters	(Germany) Proton Competition

== Circuits ==
- (Italy) Adria International Raceway (2003–2004)
- (Germany) Alemannenring (1991, 1993–1995)
- (Czech Republic) Autodrom Most (2019)
- (Germany) AVUS (1986–1990, 1993, 1995, 1998)
- (United Kingdom) Brands Hatch (2010)
- (Czech Republic) Brno Circuit (1987, 1992, 2004)
- (France) Bugatti Circuit (2000, 2006)
- (Spain) Circuit de Barcelona-Catalunya (2006–2009)
- (France) Circuit de la Sarthe (2020)
- (Belgium) Circuit de Spa-Francorchamps (1986–1988, 1991–1992, 2002, 2021–2023, 2025–2026)
- (Spain) Circuit Ricardo Tormo (2010)
- (Netherlands) Circuit Zandvoort (1991, 2001, 2003–2004, 2006–2013, 2015–2016, 2018–2019, 2021–present)
- (Belgium) Circuit Zolder (1989–1998, 2002)
- (Spain) Circuito del Jarama (1987)
- (Germany) Diepholz Airfield Circuit (1990, 1992–1998)
- (France) Dijon-Prenois (2009)
- (Finland) Helsinki Thunder (1996)
- (Germany) Hockenheimring (1986–2019, 2021–present)
- (Hungary) Hungaroring (1988, 2014, 2024)
- (Italy) Imola Circuit (1992, 2022, 2024–present)
- (Turkey) Istanbul Park (2005)
- (Germany) Lausitzring (2000–2017, 2020, 2022–2023, 2026)
- (Germany) Mainz-Finthen Circuit (1986, 1988)
- (Italy) Misano World Circuit (1999)
- (Italy) Monza Circuit (1987–1988, 2021, 2027)
- (Germany) Motorsport Arena Oschersleben (1997, 1999–2001, 2004–2016, 2018, 2020–2021, 2024)
- (Italy) Mugello Circuit (2008)
- (Germany) Norisring (1986–1992, 1994–1996, 1998–2017, 2019, 2025–present)
- (Germany) Nürburgring (1986–2019, 2022–present)
- (Germany) Nürburgring Nordschleife (1989–1990, 1992–1993, 2011)
- (Austria) Red Bull Ring (1991, 2002–2003, 2011–present)
- (Germany) Regio-Ring (1998)
- (Germany) Sachsenring (1999–2002, 2014, 2017–2025, 2027)
- (Austria) Salzburgring (1987–1989, 1993, 1999)
- (Germany) Siegerlandring (1996–1998)
- (Netherlands) TT Circuit Assen (1997)
- (Germany) Wunstorf Air Base Circuit (1993)
- (Germany) Zweibrücken Circuit (1997, 1999)
