= 2018 Petit Le Mans =

Sportscar endurance race in Georgia, US

The Track map of Road Atlanta

The 2018 Petit Le Mans (formally known as the 2018 MOTUL Petit Le Mans for sponsorship reasons) was the 21st running of the Petit Le Mans, and was held on October 15, 2018. It was the last race in the 2018 IMSA WeatherTech Sportscar Championship, and the last race of the 2018 Tequila Patron North American Endurance Cup, and was run at Road Atlanta in Braselton, Georgia. The race was won overall by the #10 Wayne Taylor Racing Cadillac DPi-V.R.

== Background ==
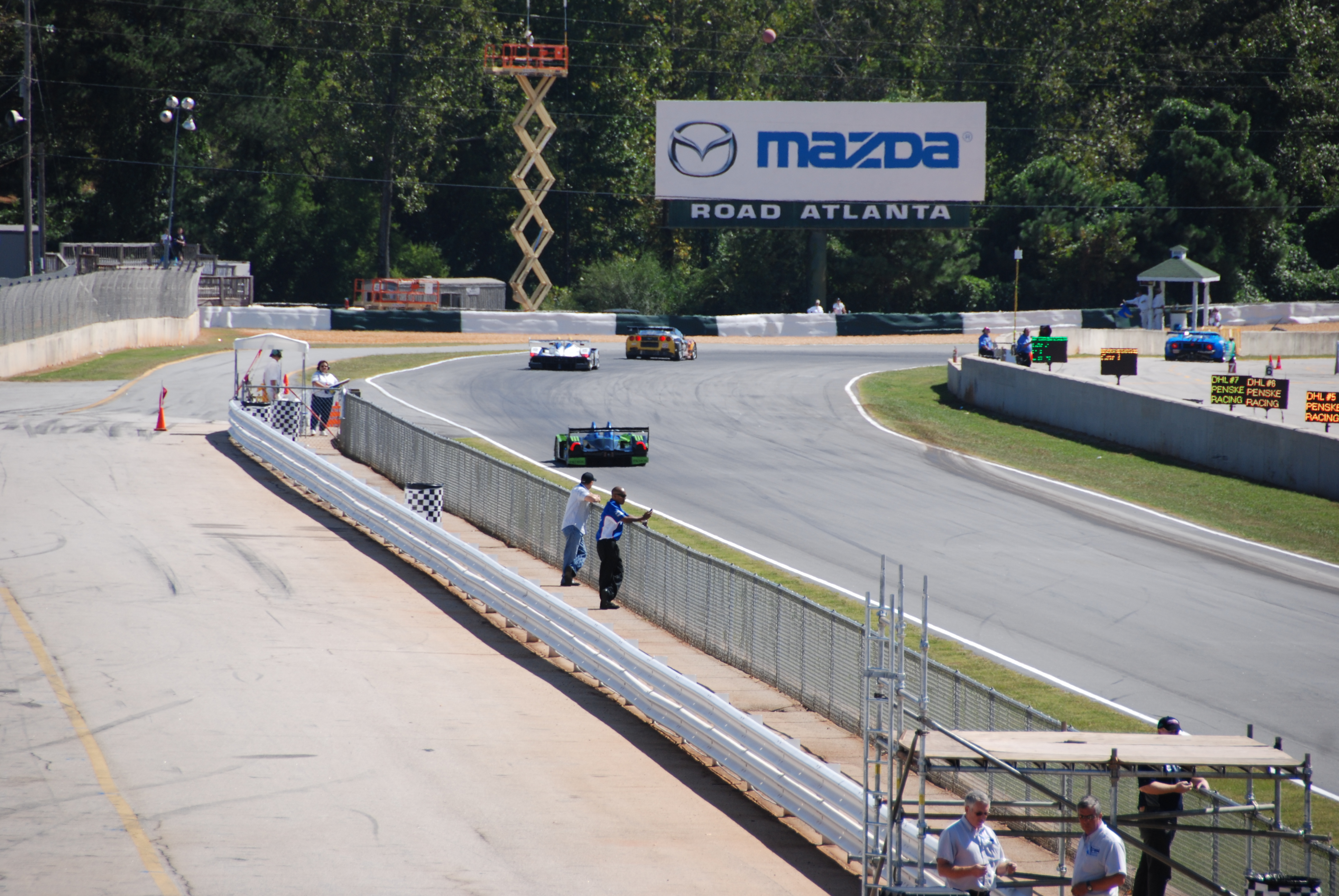
Road Atlanta, where the race was held.

International Motor Sports Association's (IMSA) president Scott Atherton confirmed the race was part of the schedule for the 2018 IMSA SportsCar Championship (IMSA SCC) in August 2017. It was the fifth consecutive year the event was held as part of the WeatherTech SportsCar Championship and the 21st annual running of the race. The race was the final of 2018's twelve scheduled IMSA automobile endurance races, and the last of four Tequila Patron North American Endurance Cup (NAEC) events. The race was held at the twelve-turn, 2.540-mile (4.088 km) Road Atlanta in Braselton, Georgia, on October 15, 2018. The 2018 Petit Le Mans marked the first IMSA race after the passing of American Le Mans Series founder Don Panoz on 11 September 2018. The DeltaWing and Panoz Esperante GTR-1 did 1 demonstration lap before the race start on Saturday in tribute of Panoz.

After the Monterey Grand Prix 1 month earlier, Eric Curran and Felipe Nasr led the Prototype Drivers' Championship with 254 points, ahead of Jon Bennett and Colin Braun with 250 points. With 299 points, the GTLM Drivers' Championship was led by Antonio García and Jan Magnussen with a nine-point advantage over Ryan Briscoe and Richard Westbrook. In GTD, the Drivers' Championship was led by Bryan Sellers and Madison Snow with a six-point advantage over Katherine Legge with 297 points. Cadillac, Ford, and Lamborghini were leading their respective Manufacturers' Championships, while Whelen Engineering Racing, Corvette Racing, and Paul Miller Racing each led their own Teams' Championships.

As the final race for the 2018 season, the race marked the final event for Continental Tire being the official tire supplier of the IMSA SportsCar Championship. Beginning in 2019, Michelin would take over as the sole tire supplier of the series.

The P class made its final appearance as Daytona Prototype International and LMP2 would split into two classes in 2019.

This was the final race entry for Tequila Patrón ESM due to Tequila Patrón ending their involvement with IMSA. As a result, the team shutdown after not finding a sponsor to replace Tequila Patrón.

On October 3, 2018, IMSA released the latest technical bulletin outlining Balance of Performance for the event. In P, the Acura ARX-05 received an increase in turbo boost and gained 2 liters of fuel capacity. The LMP2 cars gained 3 liters of fuel capacity while the Mazda RT24-P gained 1 liter of fuel capacity. In GTLM, the Porsche 911 RSR received a 0.7 mm larger air restrictor and got a 15 kilogram weight increase. Additionally, the car gained 1 liter of fuel capacity. The BMW M8 GTE received a fuel capacity reduction of 6 liters. In GTD, the Acura NSX GT3 received a 10 kilogram weight increase. The Audi R8 LMS received a 1 mm smaller air restrictor and a fuel capacity reduction of 2 liters.

=== Entries ===
Due to a highly controversial change made by the FIA/ACO in the 2018-19 FIA World Endurance Championship, which saw the date of the 6 Hours of Fuji moved to allow Fernando Alonso to compete at the home race of the sole LMP1 manufacturer, Toyota, several drivers which were due to compete in both events were unable to do so. As such, the entry list featured a large number of changes compared to the previous rounds of the championship. A total of 37 cars took part in the event split across 3 classes. 14 cars were entered in P, 9 in GTLM, and 14 in GTD. In P, Tristan Vautier substituted for João Barbosa, who received injuries from an accident at the previous round in Laguna Seca. Marino Franchitti substituted for Harry Tincknell in the #55 Mazda Team Joest entry due to a clash with the WEC race at Fuji while Lucas Di Grassi substituted for René Rast in the #77 Mazda Team Joest entry due to a clash with the DTM race at Hockenheimring. Timo Bernhard and Norman Nato subbed for Oliver Pla and Nicolas Lapierre in the Tequila Patrón ESM entries due to a clash with the WEC race at Fuji. Gabby Chaves joined Felipe Nasr and Eric Curran in the #31 Whelen Engineering Racing entry. in GTLM, Risi Competizione made its first appearance since Sebring. Chaz Mostert made his IMSA SportsCar Championship debut joining John Edwards and Jesse Krohn in the #24 BMW Team RLL entry. Mathieu Jaminet joined Earl Bamber and Laurens Vanthoor in the #912 Porsche GT Team entry. Bill Auberlen returned to the #25 BMW Team RLL entry. Marcel Fässler substituted for Mike Rockenfeller in the #3 Corvette Racing entry due to a clash with the DTM race at Hockenheimring. In GTD, Montaplast by Land-Motorsport and P1 Motorsports made their first appearances since the Watkins Glen round. Don Yount, Dillon Machavern, and Markus Palttala returned to the Turner Motorsport entry.

== Practice ==
There were four practice sessions preceding the start of the race on Saturday, three on Thursday and one on Friday. The first two one-hour sessions were on Thursday morning and afternoon. The third held later that evening ran for 90 minutes; the fourth on Friday morning lasted an hour.

=== Practice 1 ===
The first practice session took place at 11:15 am ET on Thursday and ended with Filipe Albuquerque topping the charts for Mustang Sampling Racing, with a lap time of 1:11.878.

Pos.	Class	No.	Team	Driver	Time	Gap
1	P	5	Mustang Sampling Racing	Filipe Albuquerque	1:11.878	_
2	P	31	Whelen Engineering Racing	Felipe Nasr	1:12.152	+0.274
3	P	10	Wayne Taylor Racing	Renger van der Zande	1:12.197	+0.319

=== Practice 2 ===
The second practice session took place at 3:15 pm ET on Thursday and ended with Colin Braun topping the charts for CORE Autosport, with a lap time of 1:11.669.

Pos.	Class	No.	Team	Driver	Time	Gap
1	P	54	CORE Autosport	Colin Braun	1:11.669	_
2	P	5	Mustang Sampling Racing	Tristan Vautier	1:11.806	+0.137
3	P	6	Acura Team Penske	Juan Pablo Montoya	1:11.950	+0.281

=== Night Practice ===
The night practice session took place at 7:30 pm ET on Thursday and ended with Norman Nato topping the charts for Tequila Patrón ESM, with a lap time of 1:11.457.

Pos.	Class	No.	Team	Driver	Time	Gap
1	P	2	Tequila Patrón ESM	Norman Nato	1:11.457	_
2	P	22	Tequila Patrón ESM	Pipo Derani	1:11.547	+0.090
3	P	7	Acura Team Penske	Ricky Taylor	1:11.663	+0.206

=== Final Practice ===
The fourth and final practice session took place at 11:15 am ET on Friday and ended with Oliver Jarvis topping the charts for Mazda Team Joest, with a lap time of 1:10.786.

Pos.	Class	No.	Team	Driver	Time	Gap
1	P	77	Mazda Team Joest	Oliver Jarvis	1:10.786	_
2	P	5	Mustang Sampling Racing	Filipe Albuquerque	1:10.801	+0.015
3	P	31	Whelen Engineering Racing	Felipe Nasr	1:10.831	+0.045

== Qualifying ==
Friday afternoon's 65-minute qualifying session was divided into three groups. All three categories had 15-minute individual sessions, and regulations stipulated teams to nominate a single driver to qualify their cars. The competitors' fastest lap times determined the starting order with the grid arranged to put the Prototype and GTLM cars ahead of all GTD entries.

=== Qualifying results ===
Pole positions in each class are indicated in bold and by ‡.

Pos	Class	No.	Team	Car	Driver	Time	Gap	Grid
**1**	**P**	**22**	**(United States) Tequila Patrón ESM**	**Nissan Onroak DPi**	**(Brazil) Pipo Derani**	**1:10.437**	**_**	1‡
2	P	77	(Germany) Mazda Team Joest	Mazda RT24-P	(United Kingdom) Oliver Jarvis	1:10.561	+0.124	2
3	P	55	(Germany) Mazda Team Joest	Mazda RT24-P	(United States) Jonathan Bomarito	1:10.600	+0.163	3
4	P	2	(United States) Tequila Patrón ESM	Nissan Onroak DPi	(France) Norman Nato	1:10.775	+0.338	4
5	P	7	(United States) Acura Team Penske	Acura ARX-05	(United States) Ricky Taylor	1:10.780	+0.343	5
6	P	5	(United States) Mustang Sampling Racing	Cadillac DPi-V.R	(Portugal) Filipe Albuquerque	1:10.892	+0.455	6
7	P	85	(United States) JDC-Miller MotorSports	Oreca 07	(Switzerland) Simon Trummer	1:10.912	+0.475	7
8	P	6	(United States) Acura Team Penske	Acura ARX-05	(Colombia) Juan Pablo Montoya	1:10.947	+0.510	8
9	P	31	(United States) Whelen Engineering Racing	Cadillac DPi-V.R	(Brazil) Felipe Nasr	1:10.981	+0.544	9
10	P	54	(United States) CORE Autosport	Oreca 07	(United States) Colin Braun	1:11.071	+0.634	14^{1}
11	P	99	(United States) JDC-Miller MotorSports	Oreca 07	(South Africa) Stephen Simpson	1:11.151	+0.714	10
12	P	10	(United States) Wayne Taylor Racing	Cadillac DPi-V.R	(Netherlands) Renger van der Zande	1:11.468	+1.031	11
13	P	52	(United States) AFS/PR1 Mathiasen Motorsports	Oreca 07	(Mexico) José Gutiérrez	1:11.708	+1.271	12
14	P	38	(United States) Performance Tech Motorsports	Oreca 07	(United States) James French	1:11.859	+1.422	13
**15**	**GTLM**	**24**	**(United States) BMW Team RLL**	**BMW M8 GTE**	**(United States) John Edwards**	**1:17.006**	**+6.569**	15‡
16	GTLM	3	(United States) Corvette Racing	Chevrolet Corvette C7.R	(Spain) Antonio García	1:17.030	+6.593	16
17	GTLM	912	(United States) Porsche GT Team	Porsche 911 RSR	(New Zealand) Earl Bamber	1:17.209	+6.772	17
18	GTLM	67	(United States) Ford Chip Ganassi Racing	Ford GT	(United Kingdom) Richard Westbrook	1:17.220	+6.783	18
19	GTLM	911	(United States) Porsche GT Team	Porsche 911 RSR	(France) Patrick Pilet	1:17.369	+6.932	19
20	GTLM	66	(United States) Ford Chip Ganassi Racing	Ford GT	(United States) Joey Hand	1:17.383	+6.946	20
21	GTLM	25	(United States) BMW Team RLL	BMW M8 GTE	(United States) Connor De Phillippi	1:17.428	+6.991	21
22	GTLM	4	(United States) Corvette Racing	Chevrolet Corvette C7.R	(United States) Tommy Milner	1:17.451	+7.014	22
23	GTLM	62	(United States) Risi Competizione	Ferrari 488 GTE	(Finland) Toni Vilander	1:17.774	+7.337	23
24	**GTD**	**63**	**(United States) Scuderia Corsa**	**Ferrari 488 GT3**	**(Brazil) Daniel Serra**	**1:19.695**	**+9.258**	24‡
25	GTD	15	(United States) 3GT Racing	Lexus RC F GT3	(United Kingdom) Jack Hawksworth	1:19.732	+9.295	25
26	GTD	29	(Germany) Montaplast by Land-Motorsport	Audi R8 LMS GT3	(South Africa) Sheldon van der Linde	1:19.744	+9.307	26
27	GTD	93	(United States) Meyer Shank Racing with Curb-Agajanin	Acura NSX GT3	(Germany) Mario Franbacher	1:19.877	+9.440	27
28	GTD	48	(United States) Paul Miller Racing	Lamborghini Huracan GT3	(United States) Bryan Sellers	1:20.079	+9.642	28
29	GTD	86	(United States) Meyer Shank Racing with Curb-Agajanin	Acura NSX GT3	(Portugal) Álvaro Parente	1:20.095	+9.658	29
30	GTD	64	(United States) Scuderia Corsa	Ferrari 488 GT3	(Italy) Matteo Cressoni	1:20.297	+9.860	30
31	GTD	14	(United States) 3GT Racing	Lexus RC F GT3	(Austria) Dominik Baumann	1:20.366	+9.929	31
32	GTD	33	(United States) Mercedes-AMG Team Riley Motorsport	Mercedes-AMG GT3	(United States) Ben Keating	1:20.587	+10.150	32
33	GTD	71	(United States) P1 Motorsports	Mercedes-AMG GT3	(Colombia) JC Perez	1:21.580	+11.143	33
34	GTD	96	(United States) Turner Motorsport	BMW M6 GT3	(United States) Don Yount	1:21.650	+11.213	34
35	GTD	44	Magnus Racing	Audi R8 LMS GT3	(United States) John Potter	1:21.895	+11.458	36^{2}
36	GTD	73	(United States) Park Place Motorsports	Porsche 911 GT3 R	(United States) Tim Pappas	1:22.610	+12.713	37^{3}
37	GTD	58	(United States) Wright Motorsports	Porsche 911 GT3 R	-	No Time		35^{4}
Sources:

- ^{1} The No. 54 CORE Autosport entry was moved to the back of the P field for starting the race with a different driver than who qualified.
- ^{2} The No. 44 Magnus Racing entry was moved to the back of the GTD field after the team elected to change tires after qualifying.
- ^{3} The No. 73 Park Place Motorsports entry was moved to the back of the GTD field after the team elected to change tires after qualifying.
- ^{4} The No. 58 Wright Motorsports entry was moved to the back of the GTD field for starting the race with a different driver than who qualified.

== Race ==
=== Post-race ===
Curran, and Nasr took the Prototype Drivers' Championship with 277 points. They were 3 points ahead of Bennett, and Braun in second position. Jordan Taylor and Renger van der Zande followed in third place with 270 points, ahead of Goikhberg and Simpson in fourth with 252 points and Cameron and Montoya in fifth with 251 points. García and Magnussen took the GTLM Drivers' Championship with 322 points. They were 6 points ahead of Briscoe and Westbrook in second position. Gavin and Milner followed in third place with 310 points, ahead of Hand and Müller with 308 points in fourth and Bamber and Vanthoor in fifth with 308 points. With 333 points, Sellers and Snow won the GTD Drivers' Championship, 4 points ahead of Legge in second. Bleekemolen and Keating were in third position with 299 points and MacNeil was fourth with 295 points. Cadillac, Ford, and Lamborghini won their respective Manufactures' Championships while Whelen Engineering Racing, Corvette Racing, and Paul Miller Racing won their respective Teams' Championships.

=== Results ===
Class winners are denoted in bold and ‡.

Final race classification
Pos	Class	No.	Team	Drivers	Chassis	Tire	Laps	Time/Retired
Pos	Class	No.	Team	Drivers	Engine	Tire	Laps	Time/Retired
1	**P**	**10**	**(United States) Wayne Taylor Racing**	**(United States) Jordan Taylor** **(Netherlands) Renger van der Zande** **(United States) Ryan Hunter-Reay**	**Cadillac DPi-V.R**	C	**443**	**10:00:29.165‡**
1	**P**	**10**	**(United States) Wayne Taylor Racing**	**(United States) Jordan Taylor** **(Netherlands) Renger van der Zande** **(United States) Ryan Hunter-Reay**	**Cadillac 5.5 L V8**	C	**443**	**10:00:29.165‡**
2	P	77	(Germany) Mazda Team Joest	(United Kingdom) Oliver Jarvis (United States) Tristan Nunez (Brazil) Lucas Di Grassi	Mazda RT24-P	C	443	+5.306
2	P	77	(Germany) Mazda Team Joest	(United Kingdom) Oliver Jarvis (United States) Tristan Nunez (Brazil) Lucas Di Grassi	Mazda MZ-2.0T 2.0L Turbo I4	C	443	+5.306
3	P	55	(Germany) Mazda Team Joest	(United States) Jonathan Bomarito (United Kingdom) Marino Franchitti (United States) Spencer Pigot	Mazda RT-24P	C	443	+7.605
3	P	55	(Germany) Mazda Team Joest	(United States) Jonathan Bomarito (United Kingdom) Marino Franchitti (United States) Spencer Pigot	Mazda MZ-2.0T 2.0L Turbo I4	C	443	+7.605
4	P	5	(United States) Mustang Sampling Racing	(Portugal) Filipe Albuquerque (France) Tristan Vautier (Brazil) Christian Fittipaldi	Cadillac DPi-V.R	C	443	+9.458
4	P	5	(United States) Mustang Sampling Racing	(Portugal) Filipe Albuquerque (France) Tristan Vautier (Brazil) Christian Fittipaldi	Cadillac 5.5 L V8	C	443	+9.458
5	P	7	(United States) Acura Team Penske	(Brazil) Hélio Castroneves (United States) Ricky Taylor (United States) Graham Rahal	Acura ARX-05	C	443	+30.450
5	P	7	(United States) Acura Team Penske	(Brazil) Hélio Castroneves (United States) Ricky Taylor (United States) Graham Rahal	Acura AR35TT 3.5 L Turbo V6	C	443	+30.450
6	P	22	Tequila Patron ESM	(United States) Johannes van Overbeek (Brazil) Pipo Derani (Germany) Timo Bernhard	Nissan Onroak DPi	C	443	+45.065
6	P	22	Tequila Patron ESM	(United States) Johannes van Overbeek (Brazil) Pipo Derani (Germany) Timo Bernhard	Nissan VR38DETT 3.8 L Turbo V6	C	443	+45.065
7	P	54	(United States) CORE Autosport	(United States) Jon Bennett (United States) Colin Braun (France) Romain Dumas	Oreca 07	C	443	+56.543
7	P	54	(United States) CORE Autosport	(United States) Jon Bennett (United States) Colin Braun (France) Romain Dumas	Gibson GK428 4.2 L V8	C	443	+56.543
8	P	31	(United States) Whelen Engineering Racing	(Brazil) Felipe Nasr (United States) Eric Curran (Colombia) Gabby Chaves	Cadillac DPi-V.R	C	442	+ 1 Lap
8	P	31	(United States) Whelen Engineering Racing	(Brazil) Felipe Nasr (United States) Eric Curran (Colombia) Gabby Chaves	Cadillac 5.5 L V8	C	442	+ 1 Lap
9	P	85	(United States) JDC-Miller MotorSports	(United States) Robert Alon (Switzerland) Simon Trummer (France) Nelson Panciatici	Oreca 07	C	441	Did Not Finish
9	P	85	(United States) JDC-Miller MotorSports	(United States) Robert Alon (Switzerland) Simon Trummer (France) Nelson Panciatici	Gibson GK428 4.2 L V8	C	441	Did Not Finish
10	P	99	(United States) JDC-Miller MotorSports	(Canada) Misha Goikhberg (South Africa) Stephen Simpson (United States) Chris Miller	Oreca 07	C	435	+8 Laps
10	P	99	(United States) JDC-Miller MotorSports	(Canada) Misha Goikhberg (South Africa) Stephen Simpson (United States) Chris Miller	Gibson GK428 4.2 L V8	C	435	+8 Laps
11	P	2	(United States) Tequila Patrón ESM	(United Kingdom) Ryan Dalziel (United States) Scott Sharp (France) Norman Nato	Nissan Onroak DPi	C	433	+10 Laps
11	P	2	(United States) Tequila Patrón ESM	(United Kingdom) Ryan Dalziel (United States) Scott Sharp (France) Norman Nato	Nissan VR38DETT 3.8 L Turbo V6	C	433	+10 Laps
12	**GTLM**	**911**	**(United States) Porsche GT Team**	**(France) Patrick Pilet** **(United Kingdom) Nick Tandy** **(France) Frédéric Makowiecki**	**Porsche 911 RSR**	M	**419**	**+24 Laps‡**
12	**GTLM**	**911**	**(United States) Porsche GT Team**	**(France) Patrick Pilet** **(United Kingdom) Nick Tandy** **(France) Frédéric Makowiecki**	**Porsche 4.0 L Flat-6**	M	**419**	**+24 Laps‡**
13	GTLM	4	(United States) Corvette Racing	(United Kingdom) Oliver Gavin (United States) Tommy Milner (Switzerland) Marcel Fässler	Chevrolet Corvette C7.R	M	419	+24 Laps
13	GTLM	4	(United States) Corvette Racing	(United Kingdom) Oliver Gavin (United States) Tommy Milner (Switzerland) Marcel Fässler	Chevrolet LT5.5 5.5 L V8	M	419	+24 Laps
14	GTLM	24	(United States) BMW Team RLL	(United States) John Edwards (Finland) Jesse Krohn (Australia) Chaz Mostert	BMW M8 GTE	M	419	+24 Laps
14	GTLM	24	(United States) BMW Team RLL	(United States) John Edwards (Finland) Jesse Krohn (Australia) Chaz Mostert	BMW P63 4.0 L Turbo V8	M	419	+24 Laps
15	GTLM	25	(United States) BMW Team RLL	(United States) Connor De Phillippi (United States) Bill Auberlen (United Kingdom) Alexander Sims	BMW M8 GTE	M	419	+24 Laps
15	GTLM	25	(United States) BMW Team RLL	(United States) Connor De Phillippi (United States) Bill Auberlen (United Kingdom) Alexander Sims	BMW P63 4.0 L Turbo V8	M	419	+24 Laps
16	GTLM	67	(United States) Ford Chip Ganassi Racing	(Australia) Ryan Briscoe (United Kingdom) Richard Westbrook (New Zealand) Scott Dixon	Ford GT	M	419	+24 Laps
16	GTLM	67	(United States) Ford Chip Ganassi Racing	(Australia) Ryan Briscoe (United Kingdom) Richard Westbrook (New Zealand) Scott Dixon	Ford EcoBoost 3.5 L Turbo V6	M	419	+24 Laps
17	GTLM	912	(United States) Porsche GT Team	(New Zealand) Earl Bamber (Belgium) Laurens Vanthoor (France) Mathieu Jaminet	Porsche 911 RSR	M	419	+24 Laps
17	GTLM	912	(United States) Porsche GT Team	(New Zealand) Earl Bamber (Belgium) Laurens Vanthoor (France) Mathieu Jaminet	Porsche 4.0 L Flat-6	M	419	+24 Laps
18	GTLM	66	(United States) Ford Chip Ganassi Racing	(United States) Joey Hand (Germany) Dirk Müller (France) Sébastien Bourdais	Ford GT	M	418	+25 Laps
18	GTLM	66	(United States) Ford Chip Ganassi Racing	(United States) Joey Hand (Germany) Dirk Müller (France) Sébastien Bourdais	Ford EcoBoost 3.5 L Turbo V6	M	418	+25 Laps
19	GTLM	3	(United States) Corvette Racing	(Spain) Antonio García (Denmark) Jan Magnussen (Germany) Mike Rockenfeller	Chevrolet Corvette C7.R	M	417	+26 Laps
19	GTLM	3	(United States) Corvette Racing	(Spain) Antonio García (Denmark) Jan Magnussen (Germany) Mike Rockenfeller	Chevrolet LT5.5 5.5 L V8	M	417	+26 Laps
20	GTLM	62	(United States) Risi Competizione	(Italy) Andrea Bertolini (Spain) Miguel Molina (Finland) Toni Vilander	Ferrari 488 GTE	M	416	+27 Laps
20	GTLM	62	(United States) Risi Competizione	(Italy) Andrea Bertolini (Spain) Miguel Molina (Finland) Toni Vilander	Ferrari F154CB 3.9 L Turbo V8	M	416	+27 Laps
**21**	**GTD**	**63**	**(United States) Scuderia Corsa**	**(Brazil) Daniel Serra** **(United States) Cooper MacNeil** **(United States) Gunnar Jeannette**	**Ferrari 488 GT3**	C	**407**	**+36 Laps‡**
**21**	**GTD**	**63**	**(United States) Scuderia Corsa**	**(Brazil) Daniel Serra** **(United States) Cooper MacNeil** **(United States) Gunnar Jeannette**	**Ferrari F154CB 3.9 L Turbo V8**	C	**407**	**+36 Laps‡**
22	GTD	86	(United States) Meyer Shank Racing with Curb Agajanian	(United Kingdom) Katherine Legge (Portugal) Álvaro Parente (United States) Trent Hindman	Acura NSX GT3	C	407	+36 Laps
22	GTD	86	(United States) Meyer Shank Racing with Curb Agajanian	(United Kingdom) Katherine Legge (Portugal) Álvaro Parente (United States) Trent Hindman	Acura JNC1 3.5 L Turbo V6	C	407	+36 Laps
23	GTD	48	(United States) Paul Miller Racing	(United States) Bryan Sellers (United States) Madison Snow (United States) Corey Lewis	Lamborghini Huracán GT3	C	406	+37 Laps
23	GTD	48	(United States) Paul Miller Racing	(United States) Bryan Sellers (United States) Madison Snow (United States) Corey Lewis	Lamborghini DGF 5.2 L V10	C	406	+37 Laps
24	GTD	58	(United States) Wright Motorsports	(United States) Patrick Long (Denmark) Christina Nielsen (Germany) Robert Renauer	Porsche 911 GT3 R	C	406	+37 Laps
24	GTD	58	(United States) Wright Motorsports	(United States) Patrick Long (Denmark) Christina Nielsen (Germany) Robert Renauer	Porsche 4.0 L Flat-6	C	406	+37 Laps
25	GTD	64	(United States) Scuderia Corsa	(United States) Townsend Bell (United States) Frankie Montecalvo (Italy) Matteo Cressoni	Ferrari 488 GT3	C	406	+37 Laps
25	GTD	64	(United States) Scuderia Corsa	(United States) Townsend Bell (United States) Frankie Montecalvo (Italy) Matteo Cressoni	Ferrari F154CB 3.9 L Turbo V8	C	406	+37 Laps
26	GTD	29	(Germany) Montaplast by Land-Motorsport	(South Africa) Sheldon van der Linde (Germany) Christopher Mies (Canada) Daniel Morad	Audi R8 LMS GT3	C	406	+37 Laps
26	GTD	29	(Germany) Montaplast by Land-Motorsport	(South Africa) Sheldon van der Linde (Germany) Christopher Mies (Canada) Daniel Morad	Audi DAR 5.2 L V10	C	406	+37 Laps
27	GTD	71	(United States) P1 Motorsports	(Colombia) JC Perez (Brazil) Felipe Fraga (Germany) Maximilian Buhk	Mercedes-AMG GT3	C	406	+37 Laps
27	GTD	71	(United States) P1 Motorsports	(Colombia) JC Perez (Brazil) Felipe Fraga (Germany) Maximilian Buhk	Mercedes-AMG M159 6.2 L V8	C	406	+37 Laps
28	GTD	33	(United States) Mercedes-AMG Team Riley Motorsport	(Netherlands) Jeroen Bleekemolen (United States) Ben Keating (Germany) Luca Stolz	Mercedes-AMG GT3	C	405	+38 Laps
28	GTD	33	(United States) Mercedes-AMG Team Riley Motorsport	(Netherlands) Jeroen Bleekemolen (United States) Ben Keating (Germany) Luca Stolz	Mercedes-AMG M159 6.2 L V8	C	405	+38 Laps
29	GTD	44	(United States) Magnus Racing	(United States) John Potter (United States) Andy Lally (United States) Andrew Davis	Audi R8 LMS GT3	C	405	+38 Laps
29	GTD	44	(United States) Magnus Racing	(United States) John Potter (United States) Andy Lally (United States) Andrew Davis	Audi DAR 5.2 L V10	C	405	+38 Laps
30	GTD	15	(United States) 3GT Racing	(United Kingdom) Jack Hawksworth (Denmark) David Heinemeier Hansson (United States) Sean Rayhall	Lexus RC F GT3	C	399	+44 Laps
30	GTD	15	(United States) 3GT Racing	(United Kingdom) Jack Hawksworth (Denmark) David Heinemeier Hansson (United States) Sean Rayhall	Toyota 2UR-GSE 5.0 L V8	C	399	+44 Laps
31 DNF	P	52	(United States) AFS/PR1 Mathiasen Motorsports	(Colombia) Sebastián Saavedra (Mexico) José Gutiérrez (United Kingdom) Will Owen	Oreca 07	C	367	Did Not Finish
31 DNF	P	52	(United States) AFS/PR1 Mathiasen Motorsports	(Colombia) Sebastián Saavedra (Mexico) José Gutiérrez (United Kingdom) Will Owen	Gibson GK428 4.2 L V8	C	367	Did Not Finish
32	P	6	(United States) Acura Team Penske	(United States) Dane Cameron (Colombia) Juan Pablo Montoya (France) Simon Pagenaud	Acura ARX-05	C	310	+ 133 Laps
32	P	6	(United States) Acura Team Penske	(United States) Dane Cameron (Colombia) Juan Pablo Montoya (France) Simon Pagenaud	Acura AR35TT 3.5 L Turbo V6	C	310	+ 133 Laps
33 DNF	GTD	14	(United States) 3GT Racing	(Austria) Dominik Baumann (Canada) Kyle Marcelli (Switzerland) Phillipp Frommenwiler	Lexus RC F GT3	C	226	Lost Wheel
33 DNF	GTD	14	(United States) 3GT Racing	(Austria) Dominik Baumann (Canada) Kyle Marcelli (Switzerland) Phillipp Frommenwiler	Toyota 2UR-GSE 5.0 L V8	C	226	Lost Wheel
34 DNF	P	38	(United States) Performance Tech Motorsports	(United States) James French (United States) Kyle Masson (Mexico) Patricio O'Ward	Oreca 07	C	204	Rear End
34 DNF	P	38	(United States) Performance Tech Motorsports	(United States) James French (United States) Kyle Masson (Mexico) Patricio O'Ward	Gibson GK428 4.2 L V8	C	204	Rear End
35 DNF	GTD	93	(United States) Michael Shank Racing with Curb Agajanian	(Germany) Mario Franbacher (United States) Justin Marks (United States) Lawson Aschenbach	Acura NSX GT3	C	186	Oil Pressure
35 DNF	GTD	93	(United States) Michael Shank Racing with Curb Agajanian	(Germany) Mario Franbacher (United States) Justin Marks (United States) Lawson Aschenbach	Acura JNC1 3.5 L Turbo V6	C	186	Oil Pressure
36 DNF	GTD	73	(United States) Park Place Motorsports	(Germany) Spencer Pumpelly (Germany) Wolf Henzler (United States) Tim Pappas	Porsche 911 GT3 R	C	122	Gearbox
36 DNF	GTD	73	(United States) Park Place Motorsports	(Germany) Spencer Pumpelly (Germany) Wolf Henzler (United States) Tim Pappas	Porsche 4.0 L Flat-6	C	122	Gearbox
37 DNF	GTD	96	(United States) Turner Motorsport	(United States) Don Yount (United States) Dillon Machavern (Finland) Markus Palttala	BMW M6 GT3	C	68	Crash
37 DNF	GTD	96	(United States) Turner Motorsport	(United States) Don Yount (United States) Dillon Machavern (Finland) Markus Palttala	BMW S63 4.4 L Turbo V8	C	68	Crash

Tyre manufacturers
Key
Symbol	Tyre manufacturer
**C**	Continental
**M**	Michelin

== Standings after the race ==
Prototype Drivers' Championship standings
Pos.	+/–	Driver	Points
1		(United States) Eric Curran (Brazil) Felipe Nasr	277
2		(United States) Jon Bennett (United States) Colin Braun	274
3		(United States) Jordan Taylor (Netherlands) Renger van der Zande	270
4	1	(Canada) Misha Goikhberg (South Africa) Stephen Simpson	252
5	1	(United States) Dane Cameron (Colombia) Juan Pablo Montoya	251

GTLM Drivers' Championship standings
Pos.	+/–	Driver	Points
1		(Spain) Antonio García (Denmark) Jan Magnussen	322
2		(Australia) Ryan Briscoe (United Kingdom) Richard Westbrook	316
3	2	(United Kingdom) Oliver Gavin (United States) Tommy Milner	310
4	1	(United States) Joey Hand (Germany) Dirk Müller	308
5	1	(New Zealand) Earl Bamber (Belgium) Laurens Vanthoor	308

GTD Drivers' Championship standings
Pos.	+/–	Driver	Points
1		(United States) Bryan Sellers (United States) Madison Snow	333
2		(United Kingdom) Katherine Legge	329
3		(Netherlands) Jeroen Bleekemolen (United States) Ben Keating	299
4		(United States) Cooper MacNeil	295
5		(Austria) Dominik Baumann (Canada) Kyle Marcelli	268

- Note: Only the top five positions are included for all sets of standings.

Prototype Teams' Championship standings
Pos.	+/–	Team	Points
1		(United States) No. 31 Whelen Engineering Racing	277
2		(United States) No. 54 CORE Autosport	274
3		(United States) No. 10 Wayne Taylor Racing	270
4	1	(United States) No. 99 JDC-Miller Motorsports	252
5	1	(United States) No. 6 Acura Team Penske	251

GTLM Teams' Championship standings
Pos.	+/–	Team	Points
1		(United States) No. 3 Corvette Racing	322
2		(United States) No. 67 Ford Chip Ganassi Racing	316
3	2	(United States) No. 4 Corvette Racing	310
4	1	(United States) No. 66 Ford Chip Ganassi Racing	308
5	1	(United States) No. 912 Porsche GT Team	308

GTD Teams' Championship standings
Pos.	+/–	Team	Points
1		(United States) No. 48 Paul Miller Racing	333
2		(United States) No. 86 Meyer Shank Racing with Curb-Agajanin	329
3		(United States) No. 33 Mercedes-AMG Team Riley Motorsports	299
4		(United States) No. 63 Scuderia Corsa	295
5		(United States) No. 14 3GT Racing	266

- Note: Only the top five positions are included for all sets of standings.

Prototype Manufacturers' Championship standings
Pos.	+/–	Manufacturer	Points
1		(United States) Cadillac	322
2		(United States) Acura	316
3		(Japan) Nissan	302
4		(Japan) Mazda	300

GTLM Manufacturers' Championship standings
Pos.	+/–	Manufacturer	Points
1		(United States) Ford	351
2		(United States) Chevrolet	345
3		(Germany) Porsche	341
4		(Germany) BMW	332
5		(Italy) Ferrari	84

GTD Manufacturers' Championship standings
Pos.	+/–	Manufacturer	Points
1		(Italy) Lamborghini	340
2		(United States) Acura	330
3	2	(Italy) Ferrari	310
4		(Germany) Mercedes-AMG	307
5	2	(Japan) Lexus	306

- Note: Only the top five positions are included for all sets of standings.
- Note: Bold names include the Drivers', Teams', and Manufactures' Champion respectively.

IMSA SportsCar Championship
Previous race: Monterey Grand Prix	2018 season	Next race: none
