= Robert Renauer =

German racing driver (born 1985)

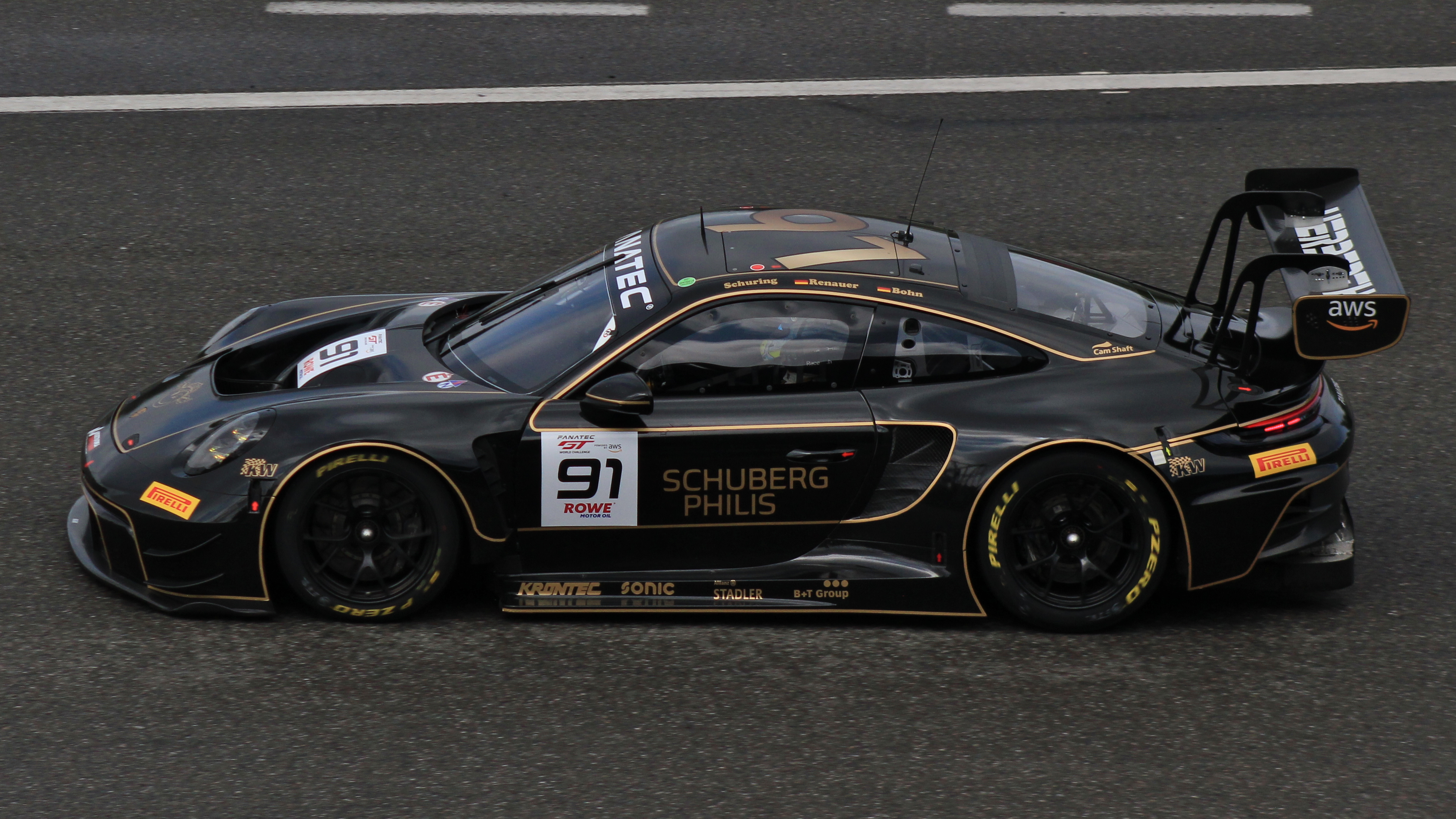
- Renauer in 2024
- Born: Robert Renauer; 15 March 1985 (age 41); Jedenhofen, Germany
- Nationality: (Germany) German
- Categorisation: FIA Silver (until 2018); FIA Gold (2019–)

Championship titles
- 2021 2018: Asian Le Mans Series – GT; ADAC GT Masters

Awards
- 2016, 2020: Porsche Cup

Robert Renauer (born 15 March 1985) is a German racing driver and team owner who last competed in the GT World Challenge Europe Endurance Cup and 24H Series for Herberth Motorsport. He co-owns and runs Herberth since 2012.

== Personal life ==
Renauer is the twin brother of fellow racing driver Alfred Renauer, who serves as Herberth Motorsport's team principal alongside him. Renauer is also the son of Alfred Herberth, who founded Herberth Motorsport in 1996 before passing away in 2012 following a motorcycle accident in Italy.

== Career ==
Renauer began car racing in 2003, competing in Porsche Carrera Cup Germany for Herberth Motorsport. Racing full time in the series until 2010, Renauer scored four podiums and finished fourth in points in both 2009 and 2010. During this time span, Renauer also raced in the 2007 24 Hours of Daytona for VICI Racing, as well as making select appearances in ADAC GT Masters in 2008 and 2009.

In 2011, Renauer joined Black Falcon for his maiden full-time season in ADAC GT Masters, in which he took his maiden series podium at Zolder, by finishing third in race two, to end the year 23rd in points. Moving to Frogreen CO2 Neutral for the 2012 season, Renauer took seven podiums, which included three second-place finishes, to round out the year sixth in points.

The following year, Renauer joined Herberth Motorsport alongside Martin Ragginger, with whom he took his maiden series win at Lausitzring and three more podiums to finish the year runner-up in points. During 2013, Renauer also raced in the 24 Hours of Spa for SMG Challenge. Returning to Herberth Motorsport for 2014, Renauer qualified on pole at Zandvoort, as well as scoring four podiums to end the year with a seventh-place points finish. During 2014, Renauer also made a one-off appearance in the GT Sprint Series for the same team at Zandvoort, in which he finished third in the Main Race.

Having returned to Porsche Carrera Cup Germany competition in 2014, Renauer primarily raced in the series the following year for his family team, taking three podiums and ending the year eighth in points. In 2015, Renauer also finished second in the GTD class at the Petit Le Mans, as well as making a one-off appearance for Rinaldi Racing in the Blancpain Endurance Series, and winning the 12 Hours of Mugello.

Renauer returned to Herberth and ADAC GT Masters competition the following year, scoring wins at the Lausitzring and Hockenheimring to end the year fifth in points. During 2016, Renauer also raced in the 24 Hours of Daytona for Scuderia Corsa, and winning in a one-off in the GTE class of the European Le Mans Series at Imola. Renauer also won the 24 Hours of Barcelona as well as the 12 Hours of Zandvoort and the 24 Hours of Paul Ricard, and was given the Porsche Cup award as the most successful privateer driver for the brand at the end of the year.

In 2017, Renauer returned to Herberth Motorsport for a dual campaign in ADAC GT Masters and the Blancpain GT Series Endurance Cup. Teaming up with Sven Müller in the former, the pair scored a lone win at the Lausitzring and a podium at Oschersleben to end the year 12th in points. Renauer also raced in the 24H Series for the same team, taking four wins and winning the Continents sub-championship.

Staying with Herberth for the 2018 ADAC GT Masters season alongside Mathieu Jaminet, the pair scored a lone win at Zandvoort and three more podiums to clinch the series title at Hockenheimring finale. During 2018, Renauer also won the 12 Hours of Imola for the same team, and also raced part-time in the GTD class of the IMSA SportsCar Championship for Wright Motorsports.

The following year, Renauer returned to ADAC GT Masters to defend his title alongside Thomas Preining, scoring a win at Oschersleben and ending the year a lowly 13th in points. During 2019, Renauer also raced in the 24H GT Series, winning the 12 Hours of Spa and 12 Hours of Brno in the A6-Am class. Renauer remained in ADAC GT Masters for 2020, taking a lone win at the Nürburgring and six more podiums to secure runner-up honors in points. During 2020, Renauer also won the 12 Hours of Mugello overall, and was given his second Porsche Cup award at the end of the year.

Remaining with the family team for 2021, Renauer raced with them in both ADAC GT Masters and the GT class of the Asian Le Mans Series. Starting off the year in Asia, Renauer won the season-opening race at Dubai and finished no lower than fifth in the following three races to secure the GT title, earning him an invite to that year's 24 Hours of Le Mans. Returning to Europe for the rest of the year, Renauer scored a best result of fourth at Zandvoort in ADAC GT Masters to end the year 20th in points, whilst also finishing 10th in LMGTE AM at Le Mans and scoring three overall wins in the 24H GT Series.

In 2022, Renauer remained with Herberth Motorsport for a dual campaign in the GT class of the Asian Le Mans Series and the Gold Cup of the GT World Challenge Europe Endurance Cup. After finishing runner-up in the former with two wins at Abu Dhabi, Renauer scored a lone class win at Imola and took two more podiums to end the year third in the Gold Cup standings. The following year, Renauer continued with the family team to race in the GT class of the Asian Le Mans Series, as well as the Bronze Cup of both the GT World Challenge Europe Endurance and Sprint Cups. After finishing 10th in points in the former, Renauer scored a class win at the Nürburgring and one other podium to secure third in the Endurance Cup's Bronze Cup standings, and also scored two podiums in the latter to end the year fifth in the Sprint Cup's Bronze Cup standings.

In 2024, Renauer only raced full-time in the Bronze Cup of the GT World Challenge Europe Endurance Cup for Herberth Motorsport, in which he finished 18th in points with a best class result of fifth at Jeddah. During 2024, Renauer also won the 24 Hours of Portimão for the same team. Following that, Renauer raced in the last two rounds of the 2024–25 Asian Le Mans Series for the same team in the GT class, winning race two at Dubai, but wasn't classified in the final standings as he was a guest driver.

Staying with Herberth Motorsport for 2025, Renauer primarily raced in the Bronze Cup of the GT World Challenge Europe Endurance Cup, scoring a best result of fifth in class at Le Castellet to finish the year 18th in points despite missing the final round. Renauer then continued with the team to compete in the 2025–26 24H Series Middle East. Racing in the first two rounds, Renauer won the 2025 12 Hours of Malaysia in GT3 Pro-Am and finished on the podium at Abu Dhabi to secure a third-place points finish in class.

Continuing with the team for 2026, Renauer raced with them in both the GT World Challenge Europe Endurance Cup, as well part-time campaigns in the Intercontinental GT Challenge and the 24H Series.

== Racing record ==
=== Racing career summary ===
Season	Series	Team	Races	Wins	Poles	F/Laps	Podiums	Points	Position
2003	Porsche Carrera Cup Germany	IBEX AG/PZ Olympiapark/Herberth Motorsport	9	0	0	0	0	24	15th
2004	Porsche Carrera Cup Germany	PZ Olympiapark Herberth Motorsport	9	0	0	0	0	44	12th
2004	Porsche Supercup	PZ Olympiapark Herberth Motorsport	4	0	0	0	0	0	NC
2005	Porsche Carrera Cup Germany	Herberth Motorsport	6	0	0	0	0	39	9th
2007	Rolex Sports Car Series – DP	VICI Racing	1	0	0	0	0	4	81st
2007	Porsche Carrera Cup Germany	Eichin Racing	9	0	0	0	0	33	15th
2008	Porsche Carrera Cup Germany	Farnbacher RT	8	0	0	0	0	41	12th
2008	ADAC GT Masters	Hermann Speck	2	0	0	0	0	0	NC
2009	Porsche Carrera Cup Germany	Farnbacher RT	9	0	1	0	3	104	4th
2009	ADAC GT Masters	MRP Motorsport	4	0	0	0	0	0	NC
2010	Porsche Carrera Cup Germany	Herberth Motorsport	9	0	0	0	1	96	4th
2011	Porsche Carrera Cup Germany	Herberth Motorsport	3	0	1	1	0	17	19th
2011	Porsche Carrera Cup Germany	Team Deutsche Post by tolimit	1	0	0	0	0	17	19th
2011	ADAC GT Masters	Black Falcon	13	0	0	0	1	36	23rd
2012	ADAC GT Masters	Frogreen CO2 neutral	16	0	0	1	7	125	6th
2012	24 Hours of Nürburgring – SP9	H&R Spezialfedern	1	0	0	0	0	—N/a	DNF
2012	Porsche Carrera Cup Germany	Hermes Attempto Racing	2	0	0	0	0	16	20th
2013	Rolex Sports Car Series – GT	Burtin Racing with Goldcrest Motorsports	1	0	0	0	0	21	57th
2013	ADAC GT Masters	Tonino powered by Herberth Motorsport	16	1	0	0	4	174	**2nd**
2013	24 Hours of Nürburgring – SP9	Pinta Team Manthey	1	0	0	0	0	—N/a	DNF
2013	Blancpain Endurance Series – Pro-Am	SMG Challenge	1	0	0	0	0	13	28th
2014	ADAC GT Masters	Tonino Team Herberth	16	0	1	1	4	118	7th
2014	GT Sprint Series	Tonino Team Herberth	2	0	0	0	1	16	26th
2014	Italian GT Championship – GT3	Tonino Team Herberth	1	0	0	0	1	16	28th
2014	Porsche Carrera Cup Germany	Team GT3 Kasko	18	0	0	1	0	97.5	10th
2015	Porsche Carrera Cup Germany	Herberth Motorsport	18	0	0	1	3	138	8th
2015	Blancpain Endurance Series – Pro	Rinaldi Racing	1	0	0	0	0	0	NC
2015	United SportsCar Championship – GTD	Magnus Racing	1	0	0	0	1	33	32nd
2015	24H Series – A6 Pro	HB Racing Team Herberth	2	1	0	0	1	27	39th
2015	VLN Series – CUP	Manthey Racing	1	1	0	0	1	9.17	NC
2015	24 Hours of Nürburgring – SP9	Manthey Racing	1	0	0	0	0	—N/a	15th
2016	24H Series – A6-Pro	Herberth Motorsport	5	3	0	0	4	109	**3rd**
2016	24H Series – A6-Pro	HB Racing	1	0	0	0	0	109	**3rd**
2016	IMSA SportsCar Championship – GTD	Scuderia Corsa	1	0	0	0	0	26	44th
2016	ADAC GT Masters	Precote Herberth Motorsport	14	2	1	1	4	123	5th
2016	European Le Mans Series – GTE	Proton Competition	1	1	1	0	1	26	12th
2016	VLN Series – SP9	Manthey Racing	2	0	0	0	2	0	NC
2016	24 Hours of Nürburgring – SP9	Manthey Racing	1	0	0	0	0	—N/a	15th
2016	Gulf 12 Hours – Gent	Herberth Motorsport	1	0	0	0	0	—N/a	5th
2017	24H Series – A6-Pro	Herberth Motorsport	6	4	0	0	4	30	7th
2017	24H Series – A6-Am	Herberth Motorsport	1	0	0	0	0	0	NC
2017	Blancpain GT Series Endurance Cup	Herberth Motorsport	5	0	0	0	0	0	NC
2017	Blancpain GT Series Endurance Cup – Pro-Am	Herberth Motorsport	5	0	0	0	0	10	35th
2017	Intercontinental GT Challenge	Herberth Motorsport	1	0	0	0	0	0	NC
2017	ADAC GT Masters	Precote Herberth Motorsport	14	1	0	0	2	76	12th
2017	VLN Series – SP9	Manthey Racing	4	0	0	0	0	0	NC
2017	24 Hours of Nürburgring – SP9	Manthey Racing	1	0	0	0	0	—N/a	DNF
2018	IMSA SportsCar Championship – GTD	Wright Motorsports	3	0	0	0	0	87	26th
2018	ADAC GT Masters	Precote Herberth Motorsport	14	1	2	1	4	137	**1st**
2018	24H Series – A6	Herberth Motorsport	5	1	0	0	1	44	14th
2018	24H Series – SPX	Herberth Motorsport	1	1	0	0	1	0	NC
2019	24H GT Series – A6-Am	Herberth Motorsport	7	2	0	0	2	0	NC
2019	Blancpain GT Series Endurance Cup	Herberth Motorsport	1	0	0	0	0	0	NC
2019	Blancpain GT Series Endurance Cup – Pro-Am	Herberth Motorsport	1	0	0	1	0	6	24th
2019	ADAC GT Masters	Precote Herberth Motorsport	14	1	0	0	1	79	13th
2019	24 Hours of Nürburgring – SP9	Frikadelli Racing Team	1	0	0	0	0	—N/a	DNF
2020	GT World Challenge Europe Endurance Cup	Precote Herberth Motorsport	2	0	0	0	0	0	NC
2020	GT World Challenge Europe Endurance Cup – Pro-Am	Precote Herberth Motorsport	2	0	1	0	1	38	9th
2020	ADAC GT Masters	Precote Herberth Motorsport	14	1	1	0	7	172	**2nd**
2020	Intercontinental GT Challenge	Precote Herberth Motorsport	1	0	0	0	0	0	NC
2020	Italian GT Endurance Championship – GT3 Pro-Am	Precote Herberth Motorsport	1	0	0	0	1	12	8th
2020	24H GT Series – GT3 Am	Precote Herberth Motorsport	1	1	0	0	1	0	NC
2020	24H GT Series – GT3 Pro	Precote Herberth Motorsport	4	1	0	0	0	46	**2nd**
2020	24H GT Series – GT3 Pro	GPX Racing	1	0	0	0	0	46	**2nd**
2020	24 Hours of Nürburgring – SP9	Frikadelli Racing Team	1	0	0	0	0	—N/a	DNF
2021	Asian Le Mans Series – GT	Precote Herberth Motorsport	4	1	1	0	2	64	**1st**
2021	ADAC GT Masters	Precote Herberth Motorsport	14	0	0	0	0	46	20th
2021	24H GT Series – GT3 Am	Herberth Motorsport	6	4	0	0	5	90	5th
2021	Le Mans Cup – GT3	Herberth Motorsport	1	0	0	0	0	0	NC
2021	24 Hours of Le Mans – LMGTE Am	Herberth Motorsport	1	0	0	0	0	—N/a	10th
2021	GT World Challenge Europe Endurance Cup – Pro-Am	Herberth Motorsport	1	0	0	0	0	6	33rd
2021	Intercontinental GT Challenge	Herberth Motorsport	1	0	0	0	0	0	NC
2022	Asian Le Mans Series – GT	Herberth Motorsport	4	2	0	0	2	62	**2nd**
2022	GT World Challenge Europe Endurance Cup	Herberth Motorsport	5	0	0	0	0	0	NC
2022	GT World Challenge Europe Endurance Cup – Gold	Herberth Motorsport	5	1	1	0	2	77	**3rd**
2022	Intercontinental GT Challenge	Herberth Motorsport	1	0	0	0	0	4	20th
2022	24H GT Series – GT3	Herberth Motorsport	3	0	0	0	0	0	NC
2022	Italian GT Endurance Championship – GT3 Pro-Am	Herberth Motorsport	1	1	0	0	1	20	NC
2022	International GT Open – Pro-Am	Herberth Motorsport	2	1	0	0	0	0	NC
2022	ADAC GT Masters	ID-Racing with Herberth	2	0	0	0	0	13	32nd
2022	Gulf 12 Hours – GT3 Pro-Am	Lionspeed by Herberth Motorsport	1	0	0	0	0	—N/a	5th
2022–23	Middle East Trophy – GT3 Am	Lionspeed by Herberth Motorsport	1	0	0	0	0	0	NC
2022–23	Middle East Trophy – GT3	Lionspeed by Herberth Motorsport	1	0	0	0	0	0	NC
2023	Asian Le Mans Series – GT	Herberth Motorsport	4	0	0	0	0	14	10th
2023	24H GT Series – GT3 Pro-Am	Herberth Motorsport	3	0	0	0	2	90	4th
2023	GT World Challenge Europe Endurance Cup	Herberth Motorsport	5	0	0	0	0	0	NC
2023	GT World Challenge Europe Endurance Cup – Bronze	Herberth Motorsport	5	1	0	0	2	88	**3rd**
2023	GT World Challenge Europe Sprint Cup	Herberth Motorsport	6	0	0	0	0	0	NC
2023	GT World Challenge Europe Sprint Cup – Bronze	Herberth Motorsport	6	0	0	0	2	49.5	5th
2023–24	Middle East Trophy – GT3	Lionspeed by Herberth Motorsport	1	0	0	0	0	0	NC
2024	GT World Challenge Europe Endurance Cup	Herberth Motorsport	4	0	0	0	0	0	NC
2024	GT World Challenge Europe Endurance Cup – Bronze	Herberth Motorsport	4	0	0	0	0	21	18th
2024	Intercontinental GT Challenge	Herberth Motorsport	1	0	0	0	0	0	NC
2024	Nürburgring Langstrecken-Serie – SP9 Pro	Herberth Motorsport	1	0	0	0	0	0	NC
2024	24 Hours of Nürburgring – SP9 Pro	Herberth Motorsport	1	0	0	0	0	—N/a	13th
2024	24H Series – GT3 Pro-Am	Herberth Motorsport	1	1	0	1	1	60	6th
2024	992 Endurance Cup	Neuhofer Rennsport	1	0	0	0	0	—N/a	16th
2024–25	Asian Le Mans Series – GT	Lionspeed by Herberth Motorsport	4	1	0	0	1	0	NC
2025	Middle East Trophy – GT3 Pro-Am	Herberth Motorsport	1	1	0	0	1	0	NC
2025	24H Series – SPX	Herberth Motorsport	1	0	0	0	0	0	NC
2025	GT World Challenge Europe Endurance Cup	Herberth Motorsport	4	0	0	0	0	0	NC
2025	GT World Challenge Europe Endurance Cup – Bronze	Herberth Motorsport	4	0	0	0	0	45	8th
2025	Intercontinental GT Challenge	Herberth Motorsport	3	0	0	0	0	1	32nd
2025	Gulf 12 Hours	Herberth Motorsport	1	0	0	0	0	—N/a	DNF
2025–26	24H Series Middle East – GT3 Pro-Am	Herberth Motorsport	2	1	0	0	2	76	**3rd**
2026	Intercontinental GT Challenge	Herberth Motorsport	3	0	0	0	0	8	26th
2026	24H Series – GT3 Pro-Am	Herberth Motorsport	1	0	0	0	0	8	39th
2026	GT World Challenge Europe Endurance Cup	Herberth Motorsport	4	0	0	0	0	0	NC
2026	GT World Challenge Europe Endurance Cup – Bronze	Herberth Motorsport	4	0	1	0	0	23	18th
2026	GT World Challenge America – Pro-Am	Herberth Motorsport	1	0	0	0	0	0	NC†

=== Complete ADAC GT Masters results ===
(key) (Races in bold indicate pole position) (Races in italics indicate fastest lap)

Year	Team	Car	1	2	3	4	5	6	7	8	9	10	11	12	13	14	15	16	DC	Points
2008	Hermann Speck	Porsche 911 GT3 Cup	OSC; 1	OSC; 2	NÜR1; 1	NÜR1; 2	NOR; 1	NOR; 2	ASS; 1	ASS; 2	NÜR2; 1	NÜR2; 2	LAU; 1; 12	LAU; 2; 14	SAC; 1	SAC; 2			NC	0
2009	MRP Motorsport	Lamborghini Gallardo GT3	OSC1; 1	OSC1; 2	ASS; 1	ASS; 2	HOC; 1; 9	HOC; 2; 10	LAU; 1; 10	LAU; 2; 11	NÜR; 1	NÜR; 2	SAC; 1	SAC; 2	OSC2; 1	OSC2; 2			NC	0
2011	Black Falcon	Mercedes-Benz SLS AMG GT3	OSC; 1; 7	OSC; 2; 7	SAC; 1 Ret	SAC; 2 DNS	ZOL; 1; 22	ZOL; 2; 3	NÜR; 1; 8	NÜR; 2; 11	RBR; 1; 16	RBR; 2; 10	LAU; 1; 8	LAU; 2 Ret	ASS; 1	ASS; 2	HOC; 1; 12	HOC; 2; 31	23rd	36
2012	Frogreen CO2 neutral	Porsche 911 GT3 R	OSC; 1; 3	OSC; 2; 13	ZAN; 1; 3	ZAN; 2 Ret	SAC; 1; 14	SAC; 2; 10	NÜR; 1; 19	NÜR; 2; 7	RBR; 1; 2	RBR; 2; 2	LAU; 1; 3	LAU; 2; 11	NÜR; 1; 8	NÜR; 2; 12	HOC; 1; 2	HOC; 2; 3	6th	125
2013	Tonino powered by Herberth Motorsport	Porsche 911 GT3 R	OSC; 1; 3	OSC; 2; 4	SPA; 1; 9	SPA; 2; 5	SAC; 1; 4	SAC; 2 DSQ	NÜR; 1; 6	NÜR; 2; 4	RBR; 1; 4	RBR; 2; 5	LAU; 1; 3	**LAU**; **2**; 1	SVK; 1; 6	SVK; 2; 7	HOC; 1; 3	HOC; 2; 4	2nd	174
2014	Tonino Team Herberth	Porsche 911 GT3 R	OSC; 1; 7	OSC; 2; 4	**ZAN**; **1**; 12	ZAN; 2; 12	LAU; 1; 2	LAU; 2 Ret	RBR; 1; 6	RBR; 2; 7	SLO; 1; 18	SLO; 2; 15	NÜR; 1; 3	NÜR; 2; 7	SAC; 1; 19	SAC; 2; 2	HOC; 1; 3	HOC; 2; 4	7th	118
2016	Precote Herberth Motorsport	Porsche 911 GT3 R	OSC; 1; 4	OSC; 2; 6	SAC; 1 Ret	SAC; 2; 15	**LAU**; **1**; 1	LAU; 2 Ret	RBR; 1 Ret	RBR; 2 Ret	**NÜR**; **1**; 2	NÜR; 2; 4	ZAN; 1; 3	ZAN; 2; 6	HOC; 1 Ret	**HOC**; **2**; 1			5th	123
2017	Precote Herberth Motorsport	Porsche 911 GT3 R	OSC; 1; 7	OSC; 2; 3	LAU; 1; 1	LAU; 2 Ret	RBR; 1; 12	RBR; 2; 25	ZAN; 1; 19	ZAN; 2; 4	NÜR; 1 Ret	NÜR; 2 Ret	SAC; 1; 9	SAC; 2; 8	HOC; 1; 12	HOC; 2; 4			12th	76
2018	Precote Herberth Motorsport	Porsche 911 GT3 R	OSC; 1; 5	OSC; 2; 4	MST; 1; 3	MST; 2; 3	RBR; 1; 6	RBR; 2; 9	NÜR; 1; 16	NÜR; 2; 5	ZAN; 1; 12	**ZAN**; **2**; 1	SAC; 1 Ret	SAC; 2; 4	**HOC**; **1**; 2	HOC; 2; 5			1st	137
2019	Precote Herberth Motorsport	Porsche 911 GT3 R	OSC; 1; 6	OSC; 2; 1	MST; 1; 21	MST; 2 Ret	RBR; 1; 7	RBR; 2 Ret	ZAN; 1 Ret	ZAN; 2; 17	NÜR; 1; 9	NÜR; 2; 11	HOC; 1; 24	HOC; 2; 6	SAC; 1; 13	SAC; 2; 8			13th	79
2020	Precote Herberth Motorsport	Porsche 911 GT3 R	LAU1; 1 Ret	LAU1; 2; 3	NÜR; 1; 7	NÜR; 2; 1	HOC; 1; 7	HOC; 2; 6	SAC; 1; 2	SAC; 2 Ret	RBR; 1; 2	RBR; 2 Ret	**LAU2**; **1**; 3	LAU2; 2; 2	OSC; 1; 5	OSC; 2; 3			2nd	172
2021	Precote Herberth Motorsport	Porsche 911 GT3 R	OSC; 1; 9	OSC; 2; 9	RBR; 1; 9	RBR; 2 Ret	ZAN; 1; 4	ZAN; 2 Ret	LAU; 1; 17	LAU; 2; 13	SAC; 1; 18	SAC; 2; 12	HOC; 1 Ret	HOC; 2 Ret	NÜR; 1 Ret	NÜR; 2; 11			20th	46
2022	ID-Racing with Herberth	Porsche 911 GT3 R	OSC; 1; 4	OSC; 2; 22†	RBR; 1	RBR; 2	ZAN; 1	ZAN; 2	NÜR; 1	NÜR; 2	LAU; 1	LAU; 2	SAC; 1	SAC; 2	HOC; 1	HOC; 2			32nd	13

=== Complete GT World Challenge Europe results ===
==== GT World Challenge Europe Endurance Cup ====
(Races in bold indicate pole position) (Races in italics indicate fastest lap)

Year	Team	Car	Class	1	2	3	4	5	6	7	Pos.	Points
2013	SMG Challenge	Porsche 997 GT3-R	Pro-Am	MNZ	SIL	LEC	SPA; 6H ?	SPA; 12H ?	SPA; 24H; 11	NÜR	28th	13
2015	Rinaldi Racing	Ferrari 458 GT3	Pro	MNZ	SIL	LEC	SPA; 6H	SPA; 12H	SPA; 24H	NÜR; 14	NC	0
2017	Herberth Motorsport	Porsche 911 GT3 R	Pro-Am	MON; 25	SIL; 28	LEC; 27	SPA; 6H; 37	SPA; 12H; 54	SPA; 24H; Ret	CAT; 29	35th	10
2019	Herberth Motorsport	Porsche 911 GT3 R	Pro-Am	MNZ	SIL	LEC	SPA; 6H; 39	SPA; 12H; 60	SPA; 24H; Ret	CAT	24th	6
2020	Precote Herberth Motorsport	Porsche 911 GT3 R	Pro-Am	IMO	NÜR; 20	SPA; 6H; 35	SPA; 12H; 28	**SPA**; **24H**; 37	LEC		9th	38
2021	Precote Herberth Motorsport	Porsche 911 GT3 R	Pro-Am	MNZ	LEC	SPA; 6H; 49	SPA; 12H; 36	SPA; 24H; 26	NÜR	CAT	35th	6
2022	Herberth Motorsport	Porsche 911 GT3 R	Gold	IMO; 18	LEC; 19	SPA; 6H; 24	SPA; 12H; Ret	SPA; 24H; Ret	**HOC**; 20	CAT; 29	3rd	77
2023	Herberth Motorsport	Porsche 911 GT3 R (992)	Bronze	MNZ; 21	LEC; 20	SPA; 6H; 26	SPA; 12H; 19	SPA; 24H; 27	NÜR; 19	CAT; 19	3rd	88
2024	Herberth Motorsport	Porsche 911 GT3 R (992)	Bronze	LEC; 28	SPA; 6H; 32	SPA; 12H; Ret	SPA; 24H; Ret	NÜR; DNS	MNZ; Ret	JED; 27	18th	21
2025	Herberth Motorsport	Porsche 911 GT3 R (992)	Bronze	LEC; 35	MNZ; 28	SPA; 6H; 32	SPA; 12H; 23	SPA; 24H; 25	NÜR; 38	CAT	8th	45
2026	Herberth Motorsport	Porsche 911 GT3 R (992.2)	Bronze	**LEC**; 35	MNZ; 25	SPA; 6H	SPA; 12H	SPA; 24H	NÜR; 35	ALG; 37	18th	23

==== GT World Challenge Europe Sprint Cup ====
(key) (Races in bold indicate pole position; results in italics indicate fastest lap)

Year	Team	Car	Class	1	2	3	4	5	6	7	8	9	10	11	12	13	14	Pos.	Points
2014	Tonino Team Herberth	Porsche 997 GT3-R	Pro	NOG; QR	NOG; CR	BRH; QR	BRH; CR	ZAN; QR; 6	ZAN; CR; 3	SVK; QR	SVK; CR	ALG; QR	ALG; CR	ZOL; QR	ZOL; CR	BAK; QR	BAK; CR	16th	16
2023	Herberth Motorsport	Porsche 911 GT3 R (992)	Bronze	MIS; 1; 29	MIS; 2; 23	HOC; 1; 19	HOC; 2; 20	VAL; 1; 23	VAL; 2; 27									5th	49.5

=== Complete IMSA SportsCar Championship results ===
(key) (Races in bold indicate pole position; results in italics indicate fastest lap)

Year	Team	Class	Make	Engine	1	2	3	4	5	6	7	8	9	10	11	Pos.	Points
2015	Magnus Racing	GTD	Porsche 911 GT America	Porsche 4.0 L Flat-6	DAY	SEB	LAG	DET	WGL	LIM	ELK	VIR	COA	PET; 2		32nd	33
2016	Scuderia Corsa	GTD	Ferrari 488 GT3	Ferrari F154CB 3.9 L Turbo V8	DAY; 6	SEB	LGA	BEL	WGL	MOS	LIM	ELK	VIR	AUS	PET	44th	26
2018	Wright Motorsports	GTD	Porsche 911 GT3 R	Porsche 4.0 L Flat-6	DAY; 19	SEB; 6	MOH	BEL	WGL; 9	MOS	LIM	ELK	VIR	LGA	PET	26th	87

=== Complete European Le Mans Series results ===
(key) (Races in bold indicate pole position; results in italics indicate fastest lap)

Year	Entrant	Class	Chassis	Engine	1	2	3	4	5	6	Rank	Points
2016	Proton Competition	LMGTE	Porsche 911 RSR	Porsche 4.0 L Flat-6	SIL	**IMO**; 1	RBR	LEC	SPA	EST	10th	26

=== Complete Asian Le Mans Series results ===
(key) (Races in bold indicate pole position) (Races in italics indicate fastest lap)

Year	Team	Class	Car	Engine	1	2	3	4	5	6	Pos.	Points
2021	Precote Herberth Motorsport	GT	Porsche 911 GT3 R	Porsche 4.0 L Flat-6	**DUB**; **1**; 1	DUB; 2; 5	ABU; 1; 2	ABU; 2; 5			1st	64
2022	Herberth Motorsport	GT	Porsche 911 GT3 R	Porsche 4.0 L Flat-6	DUB; 1; 8	DUB; 2; 6	ABU; 1; 1	ABU; 2; 1			2nd	62
2023	Herberth Motorsport	GT	Porsche 911 GT3 R	Porsche 4.0 L Flat-6	DUB; 1; 6	DUB; 2; 8	ABU; 1 Ret	ABU; 2; 9			10th	14
2024-25	Herberth Motorsport	GT	Porsche 911 GT3 R (992)	Porsche 4.2 L Flat-6	SEP; 1	SEP; 2	DUB; 1; 23	DUB; 2; 1	ABU; 1; 8	ABU; 2; 9	NC	0

=== Complete 24 Hours of Le Mans results ===
Year	Team	Co-Drivers	Car	Class	Laps	Pos.	Class Pos.
2021	(Germany) Herberth Motorsport	(Germany) Ralf Bohn (Switzerland) Rolf Ineichen	Porsche 911 RSR-19	GTE; Am	332	38th	10th
