= Mike Rockenfeller =

German racing driver (born 1983)

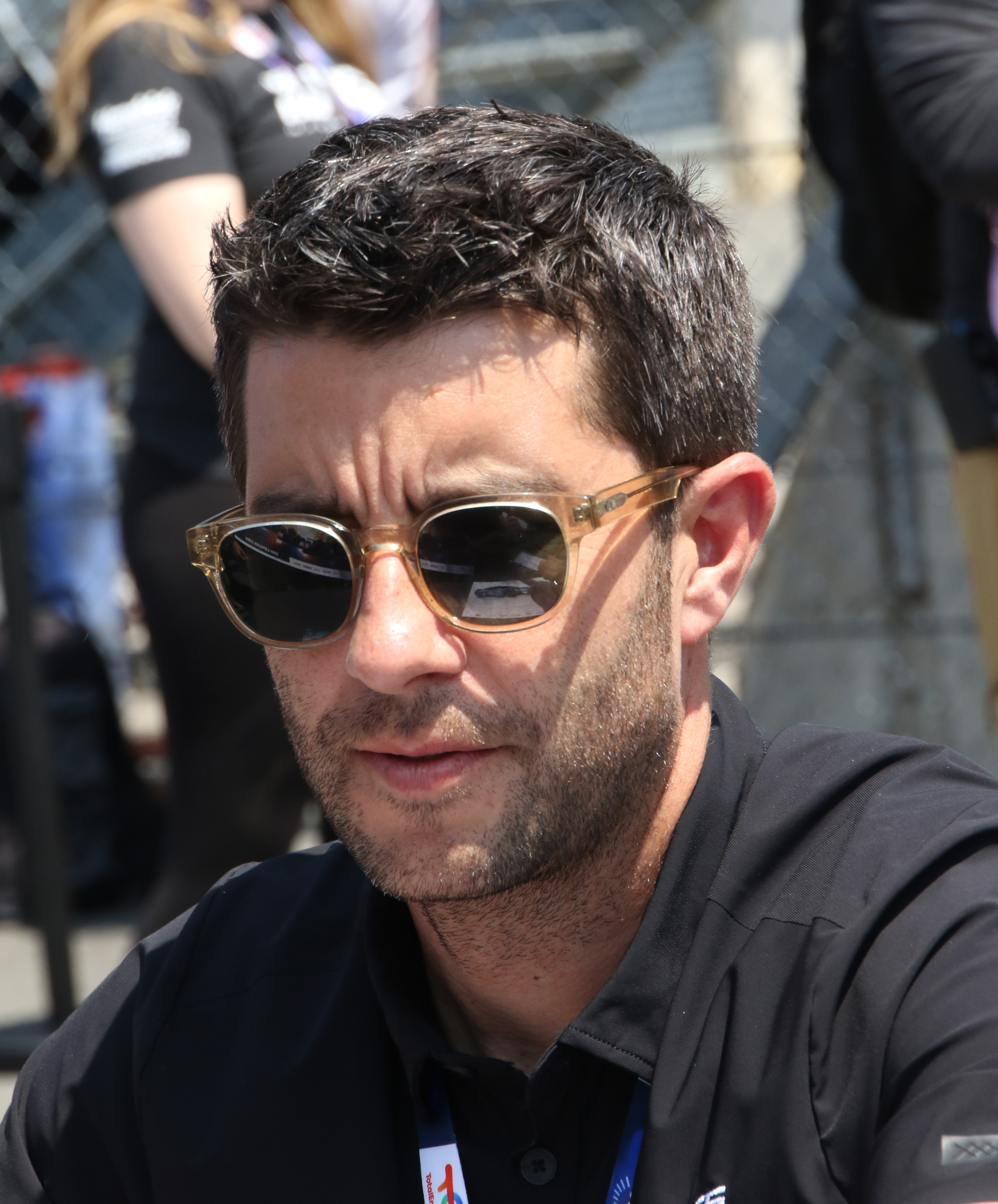
- Rockenfeller in 2023
- Nationality: (Germany) German
- Born: 31 October 1983 (age 43) Neuwied, West Germany

DTM career
- Debut season: 2007
- Current team: Abt Sportsline
- Categorisation: FIA Platinum
- Car number: 9
- Former teams: Audi Sport Team Phoenix
- Starts: 209
- Championships: 1 (2013)
- Wins: 6
- Podiums: 36
- Poles: 7
- Fastest laps: 10
- Finished last season: 8th

Previous series
- 2008 2006 2005 2002-2004 2001: Le Mans Series; Rolex Sports Car Series; FIA GT; German Carrera Cup; Formula König

Championship titles
- 2013 2008 2005 2004: DTM; Le Mans Series; FIA GT Championship GT2; German Carrera Cup
24 Hours of Le Mans career
- Years: 2004–2005, 2007–2012, 2018–
- Teams: Orbit Racing, Alex Job Racing, Audi Sport Team Joest
- Best finish: 1st (2010)
- Class wins: 2 (2005, 2010)

Mike Rockenfeller (born 31 October 1983), nicknamed "Rocky", is a German professional racing driver and was an Audi factory driver competing in the DTM and the FIA World Endurance Championship. He won his first DTM title in 2013, driving for Audi Sport Team Phoenix. He also won the 2010 24 Hours of Le Mans.

== Career ==
=== Early career ===
Rockenfeller began racing karts in 1995 at the age of eleven, winning the Bambini North state championship. He competed in various local and national karting series in the 1990s. In 2002, he won the Jörg van Ommen Kart Cup Super Series.

=== Porsche Supercup and Le Mans championship ===
In 2001, Rockenfeller moved to cars, and finished fourth in the Formula König championship, winning one race. In 2002, he joined the Porsche Junior team and raced in the German Carrera Cup, finishing tenth, and in a partial Porsche Supercup season. In 2003, he finished second in the German Carrera Cup championship, and made his American Le Mans Series debut at Petit Le Mans, finishing tenth in GT2 class. In 2004, Rockenfeller won the German Carrera Cup and also won two races in Porsche Supercup. That year, he also raced in the 12 Hours of Sebring, the 1000km of Nürburgring, and Petit Le Mans.

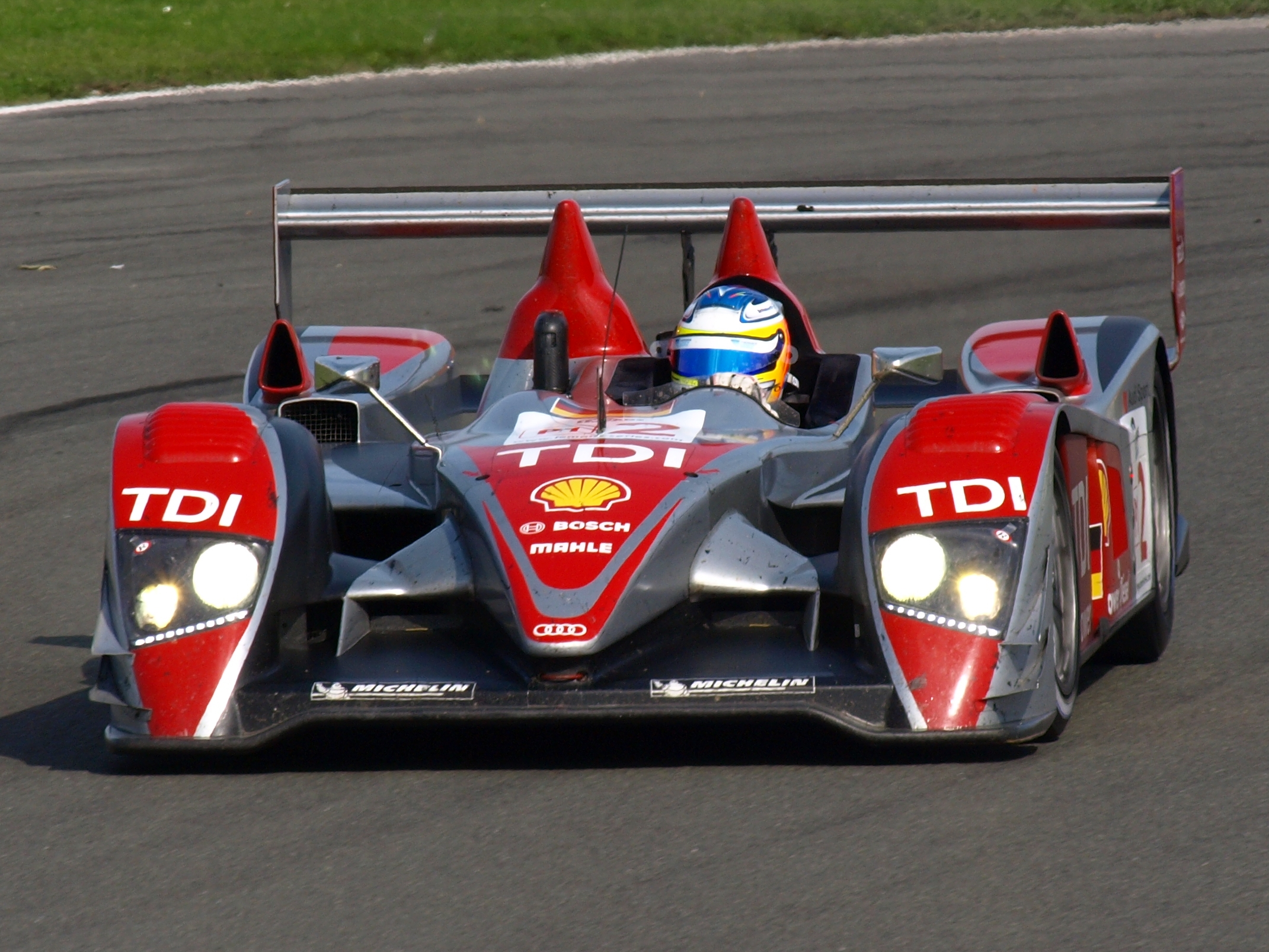
Rockenfeller driving the Audi R10 TDI en route to winning the 2008 Le Mans Series Drivers Championship.

2005 became Rockenfeller's breakthrough year. He became a full Porsche factory driver and won the GT2 class driver championship title in the FIA GT Championship driving with Marc Lieb for GruppeM Racing. He collected six class wins, including the Spa 24 Hours. Rockenfeller also won the GT2 class at the 24 Hours of Le Mans, driving with Lieb and Leo Hindrey for Alex Job Racing. 2006 saw him race again in the ALMS and Grand-Am series for Alex Job. He won in the ALMS at Houston and finished second in LMP2 class at Petit Le Mans, driving a Porsche RS Spyder for Penske Racing. He also took two Grand-Am wins.

=== Deutsche Tourenwagen Masters ===
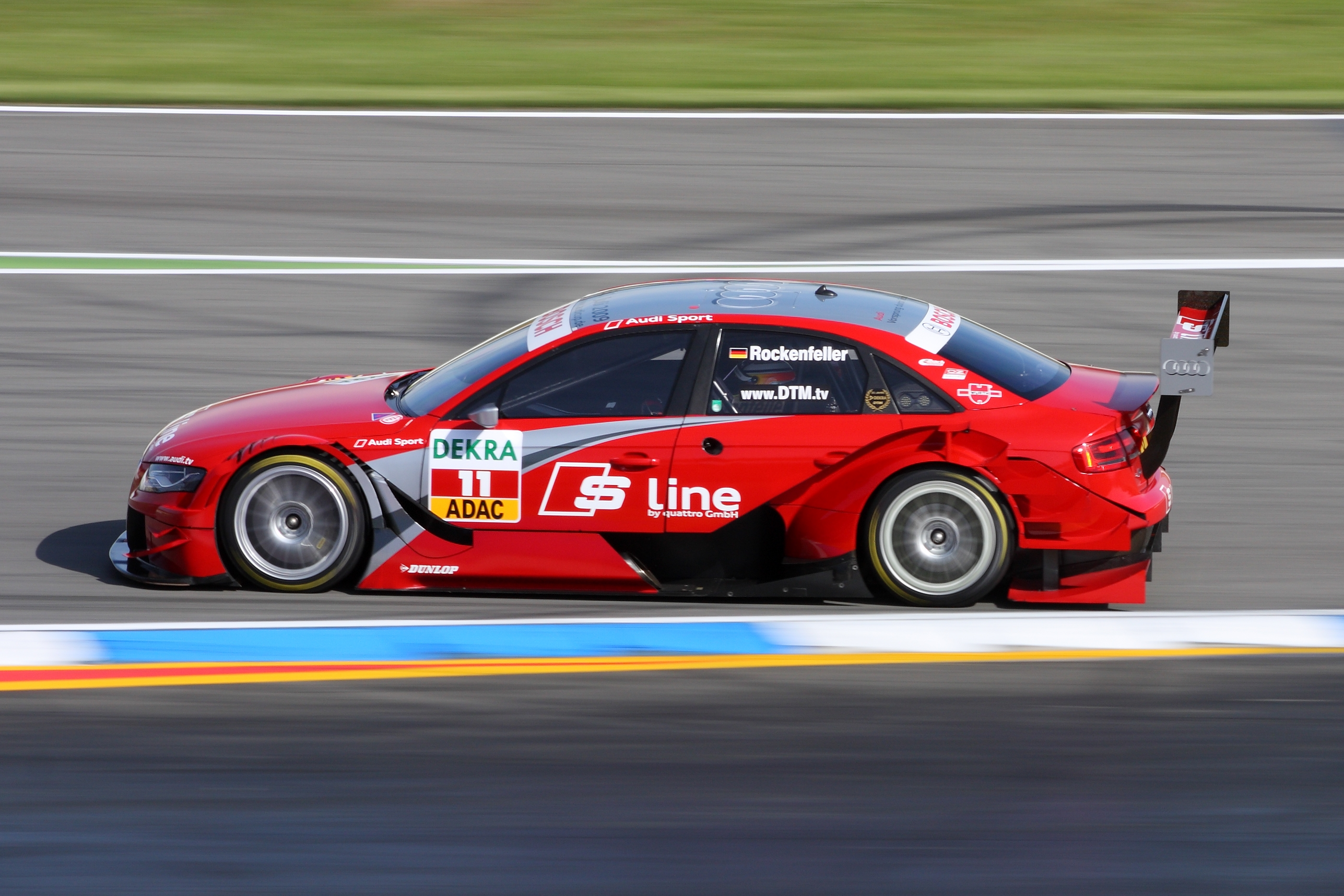
Rockenfeller driving an Audi A4 at the Hockenheimring during the 2009 DTM season.

For 2007, Rockenfeller became an Audi factory driver and raced an A4 DTM for Audi Sport Team Rosberg in the Deutsche Tourenwagen Masters. He also participated in the 24 Hours of Le Mans driving an Audi R10. In addition to DTM and having already moderate experience with Le Mans Prototype cars, in 2008 he drove for Audi Sport Team Joest in the Le Mans Series, alongside Alexandre Prémat. Despite not winning any races, Rockenfeller and Prémat won the title at the 2008 1000 km of Silverstone, after an accident on lap 46 for the Peugeot 908 HDi FAP of Nicolas Minassian and Marc Gené. He also participated in the 24 Hours of Le Mans, occupying the third Audi entry with Prémat and Lucas Luhr. After qualifying fifth, their entry finished in fourth place overall, seven laps down on winning team-mates Rinaldo Capello, Tom Kristensen and Allan McNish.

For 2009, Rockenfeller continues in the DTM with Team Rosberg.

Rockenfeller started the 2010 racing season winning the Rolex 24 at Daytona overall in the Action Express Racing Porsche Riley with co-drivers João Barbosa, Terry Borcheller, and Ryan Dalziel.

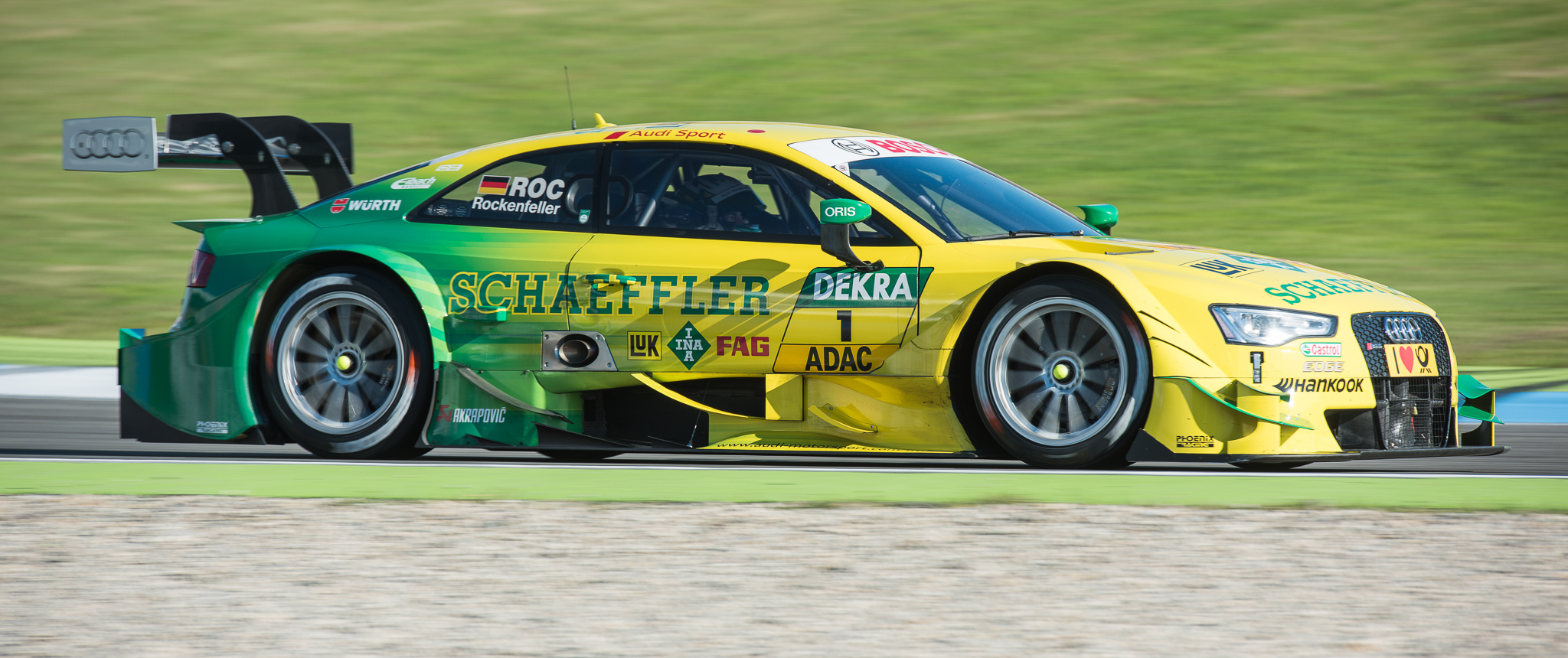
Rockenfeller competing in the 2014 DTM season.

In the 2011 24 Hours of Le Mans, Rockenfeller was involved in a horrific accident while passing a slower GTE vehicle at 5:49 into the race. Shortly after nightfall, he was involved in a violent crash at the kinks on the straight between Mulsanne Corner and Indianapolis after near contact with the number 71 car of Robert Kauffman. Rockenfeller then climbed from his car and jumped to safety over the Armco barrier. He sustained a small flesh wound on his right arm and was admitted into a hospital overnight for observation.

Rockenfeller took part in the 2014 Rolex 24 Hours of Daytona race in the Spirit of Daytona Corvette Daytona Prototype with Richard Westbrook and Michael Valiante.

In 2021, it was announced that Rockenfeller would depart from DTM following the season, whilst also parting ways with Audi at the end of the year. He would go on to finish eighth in the points with podiums at Lausitzring, Circuit Zolder, the Nürburgring, and the Hockenheimring driving for Abt Sportsline.

=== IMSA ===
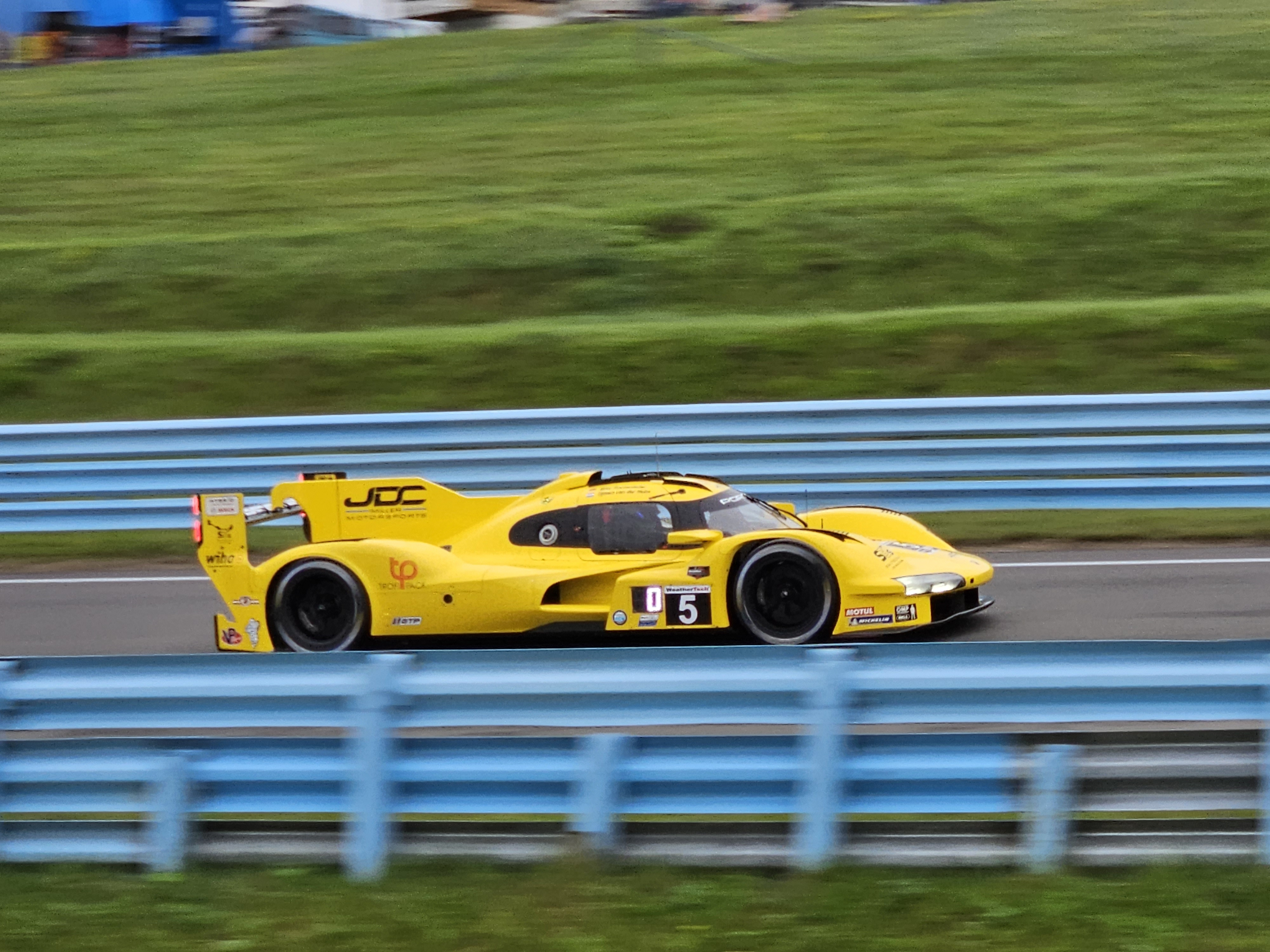
Rockenfeller finished fourth at the 2023 Sahlen's Six Hours of The Glen.

In 2023, Rockenfeller joined JDC–Miller MotorSports for the team's GTP program, driving alongside Tijmen van der Helm.

=== NASCAR ===
In 2022, Rockenfeller made two starts in the NASCAR Cup Series for Spire Motorsports in the No. 77 Chevrolet Camaro ZL1 1LE, finishing 30th at Watkins Glen, and 29th at Charlotte Roval. In the following year, it was announced that Rockenfeller would join seven-time Cup Series champion Jimmie Johnson and 2009 Formula One World Champion Jenson Button to drive the Next Gen Camaro prepared by Hendrick Motorsports for the Garage 56 entry at the 2023 24 Hours of Le Mans. Rockenfeller returned to Cup Series competition that year, driving the No. 42 Chevrolet for Legacy Motor Club to a 24th-place finish at Indianapolis and nineteenth at Watkins Glen. It was later announced he would race at the Charlotte Roval. He finished the race in 29th.

== Accolades ==
- FIA GT Championship GT2 Champion: 2005
- 24 Hours Nürburgring overall winner: 2006
- Le Mans Series LMP1 champion: 2008
- 24 Hours of Le Mans GT2 winner: 2005
- Spa 24 Hours GT2 winner: 2005
- 24 Hours of Daytona overall winner: 2010
- 24 Hours of Le Mans overall winner: 2010
- Deutsche Tourenwagen Masters Champion: 2013

== Racing record ==
=== Career summary ===
Season	Series	Team	Races	Wins	Poles	F/Laps	Podiums	Points	Position
2001	Formula König	?	?	1	?	?	?	109	4th
2002	Porsche Carrera Cup Germany	UPS Porsche-Junior Team	9	0	0	0	0	52	10th
2002	Porsche Supercup	UPS Porsche-Junior Team	4	0	0	0	0	0	NC†
2003	Porsche Carrera Cup Germany	UPS Porsche-Junior Team	9	1	1	1	3	126	**2nd**
2003	Porsche Supercup	UPS Porsche-Junior Team	5	1	1	0	2	0	NC†
2004	Porsche Carrera Cup Germany	UPS Porsche-Junior Team	9	5	5	4	9	166	**1st**
2004	Porsche Supercup	UPS Porsche-Junior Team	5	2	2	2	4	0	NC†
2004	Porsche Supercup	Eichin Racing-PZ Freiburg	1	0	0	0	1	0	NC†
2004	American Le Mans Series - GT	BAM! British American Motorsport	1	0	0	0	0	24	14th
2004	American Le Mans Series - GT	New Century/The Racer's Group	1	0	0	0	0	24	14th
2004	Rolex Sports Car Series - GT	Flying Lizard Motorsports	1	0	1	0	1	32	43rd
2004	Rolex Sports Car Series - SGS	TPC Racing	1	0	1	0	0	0	NC
2004	Le Mans Endurance Series - GT	Farnbacher Racing	1	0	0	0	0	0	NC
2004	24 Hours of Le Mans - GT	Orbit Racing/BAM!	1	0	0	0	0	N/A	DNF
2005	FIA GT Championship - GT2	GruppeM Racing	11	6	?	?	10	102	**1st**
2005	American Le Mans Series - GT2	BAM!	8	0	0	0	3	76	7th
2005	Rolex Sports Car Series - DP	Brumos Racing	1	0	0	0	0	10	85th
2005	Le Mans Endurance Series - GT	Autorlando Sport	2	0	0	0	1	8	13th
2005	24 Hours of Le Mans - GT	Alex Job Racing/BAM! Motorsport	1	1	1	0	1	N/A	**1st**
2005	24 Hours of Nürburgring - A7	Land-Motorsport	1	0	0	0	0	N/A	DNF
2006	FIA GT Championship - GT2	Ebimotors	1	0	0	0	0	3	25th
2006	American Le Mans Series - GT2	Alex Job Racing	9	1	0	0	2	80	10th
2006	American Le Mans Series - LMP2	Penske Racing	1	0	0	0	1	22	12th
2006	Rolex Sports Car Series - DP	Alex Job Racing/Emory Motorsports	13	3	4	0	6	380	5th
2006	24 Hours of Nürburgring - SP7	Manthey Racing	1	1	1	0	1	N/A	**1st**
2007	Deutsche Tourenwagen Masters	Team Rosberg	10	0	0	0	1	11	12th
2007	American Le Mans Series - LMP1	Audi Sport North America	1	0	0	0	1	19	20th
2007	Rolex Sports Car Series - DP	Alex Job Racing	1	0	0	0	0	26	65th
2007	24 Hours of Le Mans - LMP1	Audi Sport Team Joest	1	0	0	0	0	N/A	DNF
2008	Deutsche Tourenwagen Masters	Team Rosberg	11	0	0	0	0	6	11th
2008	American Le Mans Series - LMP1	Audi Sport North America	1	0	0	0	1	17	26th
2008	Rolex Sports Car Series - DP	SAMAX Motorsport	1	0	0	0	0	11	93rd
2008	Le Mans Series - LMP1	Audi Sport Team Joest	5	0	0	0	4	27	**1st**
2008	24 Hours of Le Mans - LMP1	Audi Sport Team Joest	1	0	0	0	0	N/A	4th
2009	Deutsche Tourenwagen Masters	Team Rosberg	10	0	0	0	0	4	14th
2009	American Le Mans Series - LMP1	Audi Sport North America	1	0	0	0	1	23	24th
2009	24 Hours of Le Mans - LMP1	Audi Sport North America	1	0	0	0	0	N/A	DNF
2009	24 Hours of Nürburgring - SP9	Phoenix Racing	1	0	0	0	0	N/A	4th
2010	Deutsche Tourenwagen Masters	Team Phoenix	11	0	0	1	1	22	7th
2010	American Le Mans Series - GTC	Porsche Motorsports North America	1	0	0	0	0	0	NC†
2010	Rolex Sports Car Series - DP	Action Express Racing	1	1	0	0	1	35	29th
2010	Le Mans Series - LMP1	Audi Sport North America	1	0	0	0	0	10	23rd
2010	24 Hours of Le Mans - LMP1	Audi Sport North America	1	1	0	0	1	N/A	**1st**
2010	24 Hours of Nürburgring - SP9	Phoenix Racing	1	0	0	0	0	N/A	DNF
2011	Deutsche Tourenwagen Masters	Abt Sportsline	9	1	1	1	2	31	6th
2011	American Le Mans Series - GTC	Audi Sport North America	1	0	0	0	0	0	NC†
2011	Le Mans Series - LMP1	Audi Sport North America	1	0	0	0	0	0	NC†
2011	24 Hours of Le Mans - LMP1	Audi Sport North America	1	0	0	0	0	N/A	DNF
2011	Blancpain Endurance Series - Pro	Audi Sport Team Phoenix	1	0	0	0	0	9	29th
2012	Deutsche Tourenwagen Masters	Phoenix Racing	10	0	0	0	2	85	4th
2012	Rolex Sports Car Series - GT	Flying Lizard Motorsports with Wright Motorsports	1	0	0	0	0	16	104th
2012	24 Hours of Le Mans - LMP1	Audi Sport North America	1	0	0	0	1	N/A	**3rd**
2013	Deutsche Tourenwagen Masters	Phoenix Racing	10	2	2	1	5	142	**1st**
2013	Rolex Sports Car Series - DP	Action Express Racing	1	0	0	0	0	28	47th
2013	24 Hours of Nürburgring - SP9	G-Drive Racing by Phoenix	1	0	0	0	0	N/A	5th
2014	Deutsche Tourenwagen Masters	Audi Sport Team Phoenix	10	0	1	1	3	72	**3rd**
2014	United SportsCar Championship - P	Spirit of Daytona Racing	3	0	0	0	0	76	28th
2015	Deutsche Tourenwagen Masters	Audi Sport Team Phoenix	18	1	2	1	1	83	10th
2015	24 Hours of Nürburgring - SP9	Audi Sport Team Phoenix	1	0	0	0	0	N/A	DNF
2015	Blancpain Endurance Series - Pro	Audi Sport Team Phoenix	1	0	0	0	0	13	19th
2015	Blancpain Endurance Series - Pro	Audi Sport Team WRT	1	0	0	0	0	13	19th
2015	United SportsCar Championship - P	VisitFlorida.com Racing	3	0	0	0	2	89	14th
2016	Deutsche Tourenwagen Masters	Audi Sport Team Phoenix	16	0	0	0	0	31	19th
2016	Deutsche Tourenwagen Masters	Audi Sport Team Abt Sportsline	2	0	0	0	0	31	19th
2016	IMSA SportsCar Championship - GTLM	Corvette Racing	3	0	0	0	1	85	14th
2016	24 Hours of Nürburgring - SP9	Montaplast By Land-Motorsport	1	0	0	0	0	N/A	DNF
2017	Deutsche Tourenwagen Masters	Audi Sport Team Phoenix	18	1	0	2	6	167	4th
2017	IMSA SportsCar Championship - GTLM	Corvette Racing	3	1	0	0	2	95	11th
2017	24 Hours of Nürburgring - SP9	Phoenix Racing	1	0	0	0	0	N/A	16th
2018	Deutsche Tourenwagen Masters	Audi Sport Team Phoenix	20	0	0	0	2	87	11th
2018	IMSA SportsCar Championship - GTLM	Corvette Racing	2	0	1	0	1	53	16th
2018	24 Hours of Le Mans - LMGTE Pro	Corvette Racing - GM	1	0	0	0	0	N/A	4th
2018	24 Hours of Nürburgring - SP9	Audi Sport Team BWT	1	0	0	0	0	N/A	11th
2019	Deutsche Tourenwagen Masters	Audi Sport Team Phoenix	18	1	1	1	7	182	4th
2019	IMSA SportsCar Championship - GTLM	Corvette Racing	3	0	0	0	1	83	18th
2019	24 Hours of Le Mans - LMGTE Pro	Corvette Racing	1	0	0	0	0	N/A	8th
2020	Deutsche Tourenwagen Masters	Audi Sport Team Phoenix	18	0	0	0	2	139	4th
2021	Deutsche Tourenwagen Masters	Abt Sportsline	16	0	0	0	4	89	8th
2021	IMSA SportsCar Championship - DPi	Ally Cadillac Racing	1	0	0	0	1	345	17th
2022	FIA World Endurance Championship - LMP2	Vector Sport	1	0	0	0	0	0	30th
2022	IMSA SportsCar Championship - DPi	Ally Cadillac	4	0	0	0	1	1146	11th
2022	NASCAR Cup Series	Spire Motorsports	2	0	0	0	0	15	37th
2023	IMSA SportsCar Championship - GTP	JDC-Miller MotorSports	6	0	0	0	0	1660	9th
2023	NASCAR Cup Series	Legacy Motor Club	3	0	0	0	0	39	36th
2023	24 Hours of Le Mans - Innovative	Hendrick Motorsports	1	0	0	0	0	N/A	39th
2023	24 Hours of Nürburgring - SP9 Pro	Audi Sport Team Scherer PHX	1	0	0	0	0	N/A	9th
2024	IMSA SportsCar Championship - GTD Pro	Ford Multimatic Motorsports	10	0	0	1	2	2783	6th
2024	IMSA SportsCar Championship - GTP	Proton Competition Mustang Sampling	1	0	0	0	0	281	27th
2025	IMSA SportsCar Championship - GTD Pro	Ford Multimatic Motorsports	10	2	2	0	4	3077	**3rd**
2026	IMSA SportsCar Championship - GTD Pro	Ford Racing	3	0	0	0	0	700	22nd
2026	European Le Mans Series - LMP2	Proton Competition	6	0	0	0	0	21	15th

† – Not eligible for points.

=== Complete Porsche Supercup results ===
(key) (Races in bold indicate pole position) (Races in italics indicate fastest lap)

Year	Team	Car	1	2	3	4	5	6	7	8	9	10	11	12	DC	Points
2002	UPS Porsche-Junior Team	Porsche 996 GT3 Cup	IMO; 10	CAT	A1R	MON	NÜR; 12	SIL	HOC; Ret	HUN; 8	SPA	MNZ	IND	IND	NC‡	0‡
2003	UPS Porsche-Junior Team	Porsche 996 GT3 Cup	IMO	CAT	A1R	MON; Ret	NÜR; 1	MAG	SIL; 2	HOC; 5	HUN	**MNZ**; Ret	IND	IND	NC‡	0‡
2004	UPS Porsche-Junior Team	Porsche 996 GT3 Cup	IMO	CAT	**MON**; 1		IND	IND	MAG	SIL; 2	**HOC**; 1	**HUN**; 3	SPA	MNZ; 8	NC‡	0‡
2004	Eichin Racing-PZ Freiburg	Porsche 996 GT3 Cup				NÜR; 2									NC‡	0‡

‡ – Not eligible for points.

=== 24 Hours of Le Mans results ===
Year	Team	Co-Drivers	Car	Class	Laps	Pos.	Class Pos.
2004	(United States) Orbit Racing (United States) BAM!	(Germany) Marc Lieb (United States) Leo Hindery	Porsche 911 GT3-RS	GT	223	DNF	DNF
2005	(United States) Alex Job Racing (United States) BAM! Motorsport	(Germany) Marc Lieb (United States) Leo Hindery	Porsche 911 GT3-RSR	GT2	332	10th	**1st**
2007	(Germany) Audi Sport Team Joest	(Germany) Lucas Luhr (France) Alexandre Prémat	Audi R10 TDI	LMP1	23	DNF	DNF
2008	(Germany) Audi Sport Team Joest	(Germany) Lucas Luhr (France) Alexandre Prémat	Audi R10 TDI	LMP1	374	4th	4th
2009	(Germany) Audi Sport North America	(Germany) Marco Werner (Germany) Lucas Luhr	Audi R15 TDI	LMP1	104	DNF	DNF
2010	(Germany) Audi Sport North America	(Germany) Timo Bernhard (France) Romain Dumas	Audi R15 TDI plus	LMP1	397	**1st**	**1st**
2011	(Germany) Audi Sport Team Joest	(Germany) Timo Bernhard (France) Romain Dumas	Audi R18 TDI	LMP1	116	DNF	DNF
2012	(Germany) Audi Sport North America	(United Kingdom) Oliver Jarvis (Italy) Marco Bonanomi	Audi R18 ultra	LMP1	375	**3rd**	**3rd**
2018	(United States) Corvette Racing – GM	(Denmark) Jan Magnussen (Spain) Antonio García	Chevrolet Corvette C7.R	GTE; Pro	342	18th	4th
2019	(United States) Corvette Racing	(Denmark) Jan Magnussen (Spain) Antonio García	Chevrolet Corvette C7.R	GTE; Pro	337	28th	8th
2023	(United States) Hendrick Motorsports	(United Kingdom) Jenson Button (United States) Jimmie Johnson	Chevrolet Camaro ZL1	Innovative	285	39th	–

=== 24 Hours of Daytona results ===
Year	Team	Co-drivers	Car	Class	Laps	Pos.	Class Pos.
2004	(United States) Flying Lizard Motorsports	(United States) Johannes van Overbeek (United States) Lonnie Pechnik (United States) Seth Neiman (United States) Peter Cunningham	Porsche 996 GT3 Cup	GT	523	**3rd**	**2nd**
2005	(United States) Brumos Racing	(United States) J.C. France (United States) Hurley Haywood (Germany) Timo Bernhard; Romain Dumas	Fabcar FDSC/03-Porsche	DP	432	44th DNF	21st DNF
2006	(United States) Alex Job Racing/Emory Motorsports	(United States) Patrick Long (Germany) Lucas Luhr	Crawford DP03-Porsche	DP	731	**3rd**	**3rd**
2008	(United States) SAMAX	(United Kingdom) Allan McNish (Germany) Lucas Luhr (United States) Henri Zogaib	Riley Mk. XI-Pontiac	DP	233	55th DNF	20th DNF
2010	(United States) Action Express Racing	(Portugal) João Barbosa (United States) Terry Borcheller (United Kingdom) Ryan Dalziel	Riley Mk. XI-Porsche	DP	755	**1st**	**1st**
2012	(United States) Flying Lizard Motorsports with Wright Motorsports	(Germany) Jörg Bergmeister (United States) Patrick Long (United States) Seth Neiman	Porsche 997 GT3 Cup	GT	706	26th	15th
2013	(United States) Action Express Racing	(Portugal) João Barbosa (Brazil) Christian Fittipaldi (United States) Burt Frisselle	Coyote Corvette DP	DP	708	4th	4th
2014	(United States) Spirit of Daytona Racing	(Canada) Michael Valiante (United Kingdom) Richard Westbrook	Coyote Corvette DP	P	693	4th	4th
2015	(United States) VisitFlorida.com Racing	(Canada) Michael Valiante (United Kingdom) Richard Westbrook	Coyote Corvette DP	P	734	**3rd**	**3rd**
2016	(United States) Corvette Racing	(Spain) Antonio García (Denmark) Jan Magnussen	Chevrolet Corvette C7.R	GTLM	722	8th	2nd
2017	(United States) Corvette Racing	(Spain) Antonio García (Denmark) Jan Magnussen	Chevrolet Corvette C7.R	GTLM	652	8th	4th
2018	(United States) Corvette Racing	(Spain) Antonio García (Denmark) Jan Magnussen	Chevrolet Corvette C7.R	GTLM	781	13th	3rd
2019	(United States) Corvette Racing	(Spain) Antonio García (Denmark) Jan Magnussen	Chevrolet Corvette C7.R	GTLM	563	16th	6th
2021	(United States) Ally Cadillac Racing	(United States) Jimmie Johnson (Japan) Kamui Kobayashi (France) Simon Pagenaud	Cadillac DPi-V.R	DPi	807	2nd	2nd
2022	(United States) Ally Cadillac Racing	(United States) Jimmie Johnson (Japan) Kamui Kobayashi (Argentina) José María López	Cadillac DPI-V.R	DPi	739	11th	5th
2024	(Canada) Ford Multimatic Motorsports	(Germany) Christopher Mies (United Kingdom) Harry Tincknell	Ford Mustang GT3	GTD Pro	726	31th	6th
2025	(Canada) Ford Multimatic Motorsports	(United States) Austin Cindric (United Kingdom) Sebastian Priaulx	Ford Mustang GT3	GTD Pro	723	18th	3rd
2026	(United States) Ford Racing	(United Kingdom) Ben Barker (Norway) Dennis Olsen	Ford Mustang GT3 Evo	GTD Pro	580	53rd DNF	14th DNF

=== Complete European Le Mans Series results ===
(key) (Races in bold indicate pole position) (Races in italics indicate fastest lap)

Year	Entrant	Class	Chassis	Engine	1	2	3	4	5	6	Rank	Points
2004	Farnbacher Racing	GT	Porsche 911 GT3-RSR (996)	Porsche 3.6 L Flat-6	MNZ	NÜR; Ret	SIL	SPA			NC	0
2005	Autorlando Sport	GT2	Porsche 911 GT3-RSR (996)	Porsche 3.6 L Flat-6	SPA	MNZ; Ret	SIL; 2	NÜR	IST		13th	8
2008	Audi Sport Team Joest	LMP1	Audi R10 TDI	Audi TDI 5.5 L Turbo V12	CAT; 2	MNZ; 2	SPA; 2	NÜR; 3	SIL; 4		1st	27
2010	Audi Sport North America	LMP1	Audi R15 TDI Plus	Audi TDI 5.5 L Turbo V10	LEC	SPA; 5	ALG	HUN	SIL		23rd	10
2011	Audi Sport Team Joest	LMP1	Audi R18 TDI	Audi TDI 3.7 L Turbo V6	LEC	SPA; 4	IMO	SIL	EST		NC‡	0‡
2026	Proton Competition	LMP2	Oreca 07	Gibson GK428 4.2 L V8	CAT; Ret	LEC; 8	IMO; 8	SPA; 6	SIL; 8	ALG; 10	15th	21

‡ – Not eligible for points.

=== Complete Deutsche Tourenwagen Masters results ===
(key) (Races in bold indicate pole position) (Races in italics indicate fastest lap)

Year	Team	Car	1	2	3	4	5	6	7	8	9	10	11	12	13	14	15	16	17	18	19	20	Pos	Points
2007	Team Rosberg	Audi A4 DTM 2006	HOC; 12	OSC; 3	LAU; 13	BRH; Ret	NOR; 13	MUG; 6	ZAN; 10	NÜR; 17	CAT; 7†	HOC; DSQ											12th	11
2008	Team Rosberg	Audi A4 DTM 2007	HOC; 10	OSC; 7	MUG; 14	LAU; 9	NOR; 13	ZAN; 10	NÜR; 15	BRH; 13	CAT; 5	BUG; 9	HOC; 9										11th	6
2009	Team Rosberg	Audi A4 DTM 2008	HOC; Ret	LAU; 7	NOR; 9	ZAN; 12†	OSC; 13	NÜR; 10	BRH; 7	CAT; 12	DIJ; 13	HOC; 9											14th	4
2010	Team Phoenix	Audi A4 DTM 2008	HOC; 5	VAL; 6	LAU; 4	NOR; 12	NÜR; 9	ZAN; 13	BRH; 9	OSC; 5	HOC; 3	ADR; 16	SHA; 12										7th	22
2011	Abt Sportsline	Audi A4 DTM 2009	HOC; 11	ZAN; 1	SPL; 5	LAU	NOR; 14	NÜR; 3	**BRH**; 6	OSC; 6	VAL; 9	HOC; 4											6th	31
2012	Phoenix Racing	Audi A5 DTM	HOC; 5	LAU; 13	BRH; 3	SPL; 7	NOR; 6	NÜR; 5	ZAN; 2	OSC; 6	VAL; 5	HOC; Ret											4th	85
2013	Phoenix Racing	Audi RS5 DTM	HOC; 8	**BRH**; 1	SPL; 4	LAU; 2	NOR; 5	**MSC**; 1	NÜR; 4	OSC; 2	ZAN; 2	HOC; 16											1st	142
2014	Audi Sport Team Phoenix	Audi RS5 DTM	HOC; 4	OSC; 2	HUN; 10	NOR; 8	MSC; Ret	SPL; 13	NÜR; 2	LAU; 10	**ZAN**; 15	HOC; 2											3rd	72
2015	Audi Sport Team Phoenix	Audi RS5 DTM	HOC; 1; 5	**HOC**; **2**; 6	LAU; 1; 9	LAU; 2; 10	NOR; 1; 14	NOR; 2 Ret	ZAN; 1; 8	ZAN; 2; 11	SPL; 1; 8	SPL; 2; 4	MSC; 1; 10	**MSC**; **2**; 1	OSC; 1 Ret	OSC; 2; 19	NÜR; 1; 11	NÜR; 2; 7	HOC; 1; 5	HOC; 2; 15			10th	83
2016	Audi Sport Team Phoenix	Audi RS5 DTM	HOC; 1 Ret	HOC; 2; 10	SPL; 1; 12	SPL; 2; 8	LAU; 1; 19	LAU; 2; 17	NOR; 1; 18	NOR; 2 DSQ	ZAN; 1; 14	ZAN; 2; 15	MSC; 1; 16	MSC; 2; 15	NÜR; 1; 14	NÜR; 2; 22	HUN; 1; 4	HUN; 2; 8					19th	31
2016	Audi Sport Team Abt Sportsline	Audi RS5 DTM																	HOC; 1; 5	HOC; 2; 11			19th	31
2017	Audi Sport Team Phoenix	Audi RS5 DTM	HOC; 1; 3	HOC; 2; 7	LAU; 1; 5	LAU; 2; 5	HUN; 1; 4	HUN; 2; 10	NOR; 1; 13	NOR; 2 Ret	MSC; 1; 2	MSC; 2; 12	ZAN; 1; 4	ZAN; 2; 1	NÜR; 1; 14	NÜR; 2; 17	SPL; 1; 7	SPL; 2; 2	HOC; 1; 2	HOC; 2; 3			4th	167
2018	Audi Sport Team Phoenix	Audi RS5 DTM	HOC; 1; 14	HOC; 2; 2	LAU; 1; 11	LAU; 2; 8	HUN; 1; 11	HUN; 2; 4	NOR; 1; 15	NOR; 2; 16	ZAN; 1; 15	ZAN; 2; 16	BRH; 1; 10	BRH; 2; 6	MIS; 1; 10	MIS; 2; 9	NÜR; 1; 6	NÜR; 2; 13	SPL; 1; 2	SPL; 2; 8	HOC; 1; 6	HOC; 2; 11	11th	87
2019	Audi Sport Team Phoenix	Audi RS5 Turbo DTM	HOC; 1; 2	HOC; 2 Ret	ZOL; 1; 5	ZOL; 2; 4	MIS; 1; 6	MIS; 2; 10	NOR; 1 Ret	NOR; 2; 3	ASS; 1; 9	ASS; 2; 1	BRH; 1; 7	BRH; 2; 6	LAU; 1; 3	LAU; 2; 3	NÜR; 1 Ret	NÜR; 2; 7	HOC; 1; 3	**HOC**; **2**; 2			4th	182
2020	Audi Sport Team Phoenix	Audi RS5 Turbo DTM	SPA; 1; 4	SPA; 2; 5	LAU; 1; 11	LAU; 2; 5	LAU; 1; 6	LAU; 2; 11	ASS; 1; 4	ASS; 2; 11	NÜR; 1; 4	NÜR; 2; 3	NÜR; 1; 9	NÜR; 2; 7	ZOL; 1; 8	ZOL; 2; 2	ZOL; 1 Ret	ZOL; 2; 6	HOC; 1; 6	HOC; 2; 4			4th	139
2021	Abt Sportsline	Audi R8 LMS Evo	MNZ; 1; 9	MNZ; 2; 8	LAU; 1; 3^{3}	LAU; 2; 8	ZOL; 1; 2	ZOL; 2; 10^{3}	NÜR; 1; 3	NÜR; 2 Ret	RBR; 1; 15	RBR; 2 Ret	ASS; 1; 13	ASS; 2; 11	HOC; 1; 3	HOC; 2; 15	NOR; 1 Ret	NOR; 2; 4					8th	89

^{†} Driver did not finish, but was classified as he completed 90% of the winner's race distance.

=== Complete IMSA SportsCar Championship results ===
(key) (Races in bold indicate pole position) (Races in italics indicate fastest lap)

Year	Team	No.	Class	Make	Engine	1	2	3	4	5	6	7	8	9	10	11	Rank	Points	Ref
2014	Spirit of Daytona Racing	90	P	Coyote Corvette DP	Chevrolet 5.5 L V8	DAY; 4	SEB; 10	LBH	LGA	DET	WGL	MOS	IMS	ELK	COA	PET; 7	28th	76	
2015	VisitFlorida.com Racing	90	P	Coyote Corvette DP	Chevrolet 5.5 L V8	DAY; 3	SEB; 3	LBH	LGA	DET	WGL	MOS	ELK	COA	PET; 5		14th	89	
2016	Corvette Racing	3	GTLM	Chevrolet Corvette C7.R	Chevrolet 5.5 L V8	DAY; 2	SEB; 9	LBH	LGA	WGL	MOS	LIM	ELK	VIR	COA	PET; 4	14th	85	
2017	Corvette Racing	3	GTLM	Chevrolet Corvette C7.R	Chevrolet 5.5 L V8	DAY; 4	SEB; 1	LBH	COA	WGL	MOS	LIM	ELK	VIR	LGA	PET; 2	11th	95	
2018	Corvette Racing	3	GTLM	Chevrolet Corvette C7.R	Chevrolet 5.5 L V8	**DAY**; 3	SEB; 8	LBH	MDO	WGL	MOS	LIM	ELK	VIR	LGA	PET	16th	53	
2019	Corvette Racing	3	GTLM	Chevrolet Corvette C7.R	Chevrolet 5.5 L V8	DAY; 6	SEB; 3	LBH	MDO	WGL	MOS	LIM	ELK	VIR	LGA	PET; 4	18th	83	
2021	Ally Cadillac Racing	48	DPi	Cadillac DPi-V.R	Cadillac LT1 5.5 L V8	DAY; 2	SEB	MDO	DET	WGL	WGL	ELK	LGA	LBH	PET		17th	345	
2022	Ally Cadillac	48	DPi	Cadillac DPi-V.R	Cadillac LT1 5.5 L V8	DAY; 5	SEB; 6	LBH	LGA	MDO	DET	WGL; 6	MOS	ELK	PET; 3		11th	1146	
2023	JDC-Miller MotorSports	5	GTP	Porsche 963	Porsche 9RD 4.6 L V8	DAY	SEB	LBH	LGA; 7	WGL; 4	MOS; 4	ELK; 5	IMS; 8	PET; 5			9th	1660	
2024	Ford Multimatic Motorsports	64	GTD Pro	Ford Mustang GT3	Ford Coyote 5.4 L V8	DAY; 6	SEB; 7		LGA; 9	DET; 11	WGL; 5	MOS; 4	ELK; 10	VIR; 2	IMS; 2	PET; 8	6th	2783	
2024	Proton Competition Mustang Sampling	5	GTP	Porsche 963	Porsche 9RD 4.6 L V8			LBH; 5									27th	281	
2025	Ford Multimatic Motorsports	64	GTD Pro	Ford Mustang GT3	Ford Coyote 5.4 L V8	**DAY**; 3	SEB; 5	LGA; 9	**DET**; 1	WGL; 6	MOS; 10	ELK; 2	VIR; 4	IMS; 1	PET; 4		3rd	3077	
2026	Ford Racing	63	GTD Pro	Ford Mustang GT3 Evo	Ford Coyote 5.4 L V8	DAY; 14	SEB; 6	LGA	DET	WGL	MOS	ELK	VIR	IMS	PET; 9		22nd	700	

=== Complete FIA World Endurance Championship results ===
(key) (Races in bold indicate pole position; races in italics indicate fastest lap)

Year	Entrant	Class	Car	Engine	1	2	3	4	5	6	Rank	Points
2022	Vector Sport	LMP2	Oreca 07	Gibson GK428 4.2 L V8	SEB; NC	SPA	LMS	MNZ	FUJ	BHR	30th	0

=== NASCAR ===
(key) (Bold – Pole position awarded by qualifying time. Italics – Pole position earned by points standings or practice time. * – Most laps led.)

==== Cup Series ====
NASCAR Cup Series results
Year	Team	No.	Make	1	2	3	4	5	6	7	8	9	10	11	12	13	14	15	16	17	18	19	20	21	22	23	24	25	26	27	28	29	30	31	32	33	34	35	36	NCSC	Pts	Ref
2022	Spire Motorsports	77	Chevy	DAY	CAL	LVS	PHO	ATL	COA	RCH	MAR	BRD	TAL	DOV	DAR	KAN	CLT	GTW	SON	NSH	ROA	ATL	NHA	POC	IRC	MCH	RCH	GLN; 30	DAY	DAR	KAN	BRI	TEX	TAL	ROV; 29	LVS	HOM	MAR	PHO	37th	15	
2023	Legacy Motor Club	42	Chevy	DAY	CAL	LVS	PHO	ATL	COA	RCH	BRD	MAR	TAL	DOV	KAN	DAR	CLT	GTW	SON	NSH	CSC	ATL	NHA	POC	RCH	MCH	IRC; 24	GLN; 19	DAY	DAR	KAN	BRI	TEX	TAL	ROV; 29	LVS	HOM	MAR	PHO	36th	39	

Sporting positions
Preceded by Frank Stippler	Porsche Carrera Cup Germany; Champion; 2004	Succeeded by Christian Menzel
Preceded by Stéphane Sarrazin; Pedro Lamy	Le Mans Series; Champion; 2008; With: Alexandre Prémat	Succeeded by Tomáš Enge; Jan Charouz; Stefan Mücke
Preceded by David Brabham; Marc Gené; Alexander Wurz	Winner of the 24 Hours of Le Mans; 2010; With: Timo Bernhard & Romain Dumas	Succeeded by Marcel Fässler; André Lotterer; Benoît Tréluyer
Preceded by Bruno Spengler	Deutsche Tourenwagen Masters; Champion; 2013	Succeeded by Marco Wittmann
