= Porsche Junioren =

The Porsche Junioren (German: Porsche Junioren) are a team of young racing drivers, employed by Porsche and driving for various private teams, as Porsche officially retired from factory racing after winning the 1998 24 Hours of Le Mans overall with the Porsche 911 GT1. The current Porsche Junioren (as of 2025) are Alessandro Ghiretti of France and Theo Oeverhaus of Germany.

Porsche supports its customer teams with race cars, as well as voluntarily with young race drivers, who drive in many race series worldwide and furthermore support the advancement of the race cars. Porsche gives its works drivers room for improvement and advancement with contracts lasting for several years. Porsche driver usually participates up to 25 races a year, among them many endurance races, and often in different race car models. Former Porsche Junior drivers include Dirk Muller, Thierry Boutsen, Randy Pobst, Johnny Mowlem, Romain Dumas, Timo Bernhard, Jörg Bergmeister, Patrick Long, and Bob Wollek.

== Results ==
The 2006 24 Hours Nürburgring was won by Lucas Luhr, Timo Bernhard, Mike Rockenfeller, and Marcel Tiemann in a Porsche 911 GT3-MR.
