= 2008 Porsche Carrera Cup Germany =

Motor racing competition

Seasons
- ← 2007 2009 →

The 2008 Porsche Carrera Cup Deutschland season was the 23rd German Porsche Carrera Cup season. It began on 13 April at Hockenheim and finished on 26 October at the same circuit, after nine races. It ran as a support championship for the 2008 DTM season. René Rast won the first of his two championships with the MRS-Team.

== Teams and drivers ==
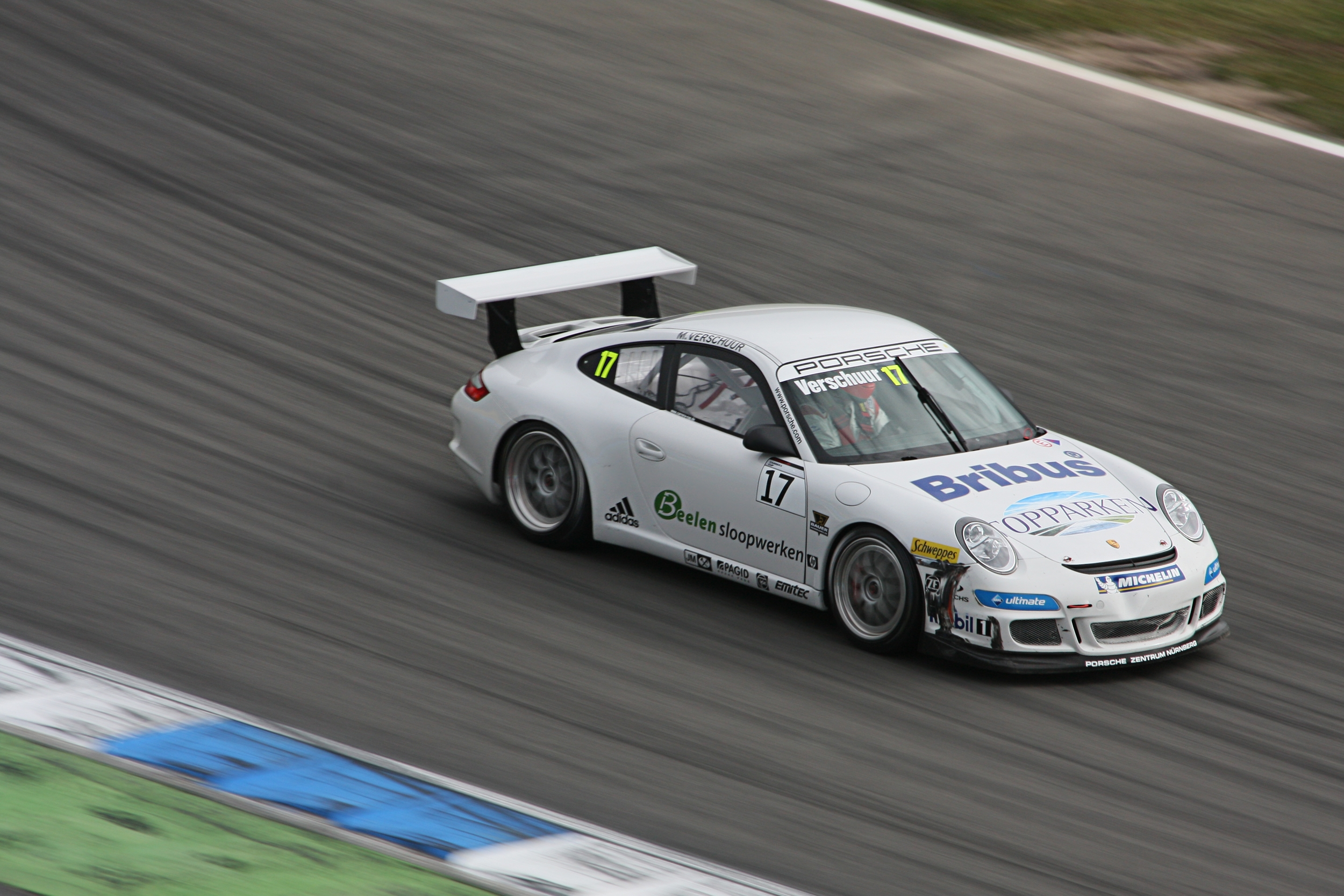
Mike Verschuur placed 27th driving for Eichin Racing.

Team	No.	Drivers	Rounds
(Germany) UPS Porsche Junior Team	1	(Austria) Martin Ragginger	All
(Germany) UPS Porsche Junior Team	2	(Germany) Marco Holzer	All
(Germany) ARAXA Racing	3	(France) Nicolas Armindo	All
(Germany) ARAXA Racing	4	(Sweden) Carl-Olov Carlsson	All
(Germany) Farnbacher RT	5	(Germany) Robert Renauer	All
(Germany) Farnbacher RT	6	(Germany) Niclas Kentenich	All
(Germany) Mamerow Racing	7	(Netherlands) Tim Buijs	1, 3
(Germany) Mamerow Racing	7	(Netherlands) Jeroen Bleekemolen	2, 4–5
(Germany) Mamerow Racing	7	(Germany) Pascal Kochem	6
(Germany) Mamerow Racing	7	(Germany) Lance David Arnold	7–9
(Germany) Mamerow Racing	8	(Germany) Christian Mamerow	All
(Germany) Schnabel Engineering	9	(Czech Republic) Jiří Janák	1–8
(Germany) Schnabel Engineering	9	(Belgium) David Saelens	9
(Germany) Schnabel Engineering	10	(Germany) Hannes Plesse	All
(Germany) Herberth Motorsport	11	(Australia) Alex Davison	1
(Germany) Herberth Motorsport	11	(Germany) Uwe Alzen	2–9
(Germany) Herberth Motorsport	12	(Germany) Jörg Hardt	All
(Germany) MRS-Team	14	(Germany) René Rast	All
(Germany) MRS-Team	15	(Germany) Mario Josten	All
(Germany) MRS-Team	45	(Austria) Norbert Schratter	9
(Germany) Eichin Racing	16	(Germany) Pascal Kochem	1–3
(Germany) Eichin Racing	16	(Netherlands) Tim Buijs	4–9
(Germany) Eichin Racing	17	(Netherlands) Mike Verschuur	All
(Germany) Eichin Racing	46	(Germany) Swen Dolenc	9
(Germany) SMS Seyffarth-Motorsport	18	(Germany) Jan Seyffarth	All
(Germany) SMS Seyffarth-Motorsport	19	(Poland) Robert Lukas	All
(Germany) Land Motorsport	20	(Germany) Patrick Hirsch	All
(Germany) Land Motorsport	21	(Lithuania) Andzej Dzikevic	All
(Czech Republic) Mičának Motorsport	22	(Czech Republic) Jiří Mičának	All
(Czech Republic) Mičának Motorsport	23	(Russia) Oleg Kesselman	All
(Germany) MS Racing	24	(Germany) Florian Stoll	All
(Germany) MS Racing	25	(Switzerland) Ivan Jacoma	All
(Germany) tolimit	33	(Germany) Christian Abt	All
(Germany) tolimit	44	(Germany) Christian Engelhart	All
(Germany) Online Leasing RT	66	(Germany) Florian Scholze	1–2, 4–9
(Germany) Online Leasing RT	66	(Germany) Christoph Schrezemmeier	3
(Germany) Online Leasing RT	77	(Germany) Thomas Jäger	All
(Turkey) Hermes Attempto Racing	88	(Netherlands) Patrick Huisman	All
(Turkey) Hermes Attempto Racing	99	(Germany) Philipp Wlazik	All

== Race calendar and results ==
Round	Circuit	Date	Pole position	Fastest lap	Winning driver	Winning team
1	(Germany) Hockenheimring	13 April	(Germany) René Rast	(Germany) Jan Seyffarth	(Germany) René Rast	(Germany) MRS-Team
2	(Germany) Oschersleben	20 April	(Germany) Jörg Hardt	(Germany) Uwe Alzen	(Germany) Jörg Hardt	(Germany) Herberth Motorsport
3	(Italy) Mugello	4 May	(Germany) Uwe Alzen	(Germany) Uwe Alzen	(Germany) Uwe Alzen	(Germany) Herberth Motorsport
4	(Germany) EuroSpeedway Lausitz	18 May	(Germany) René Rast	(France) Nicolas Armindo	(Germany) Jörg Hardt	(Germany) Herberth motorsport
5	(Germany) Norisring	29 June	(France) Nicolas Armindo	(France) Nicolas Armindo	(France) Nicolas Armindo	(Germany) ARAXA Racing
6	(Netherlands) Zandvoort	13 July	(Germany) Christian Mamerow	(Germany) René Rast	(Germany) Jan Seyffarth	(Germany) SMS Seyffarth-Motorsport
7	(Germany) Nürburgring Short	27 July	(Germany) René Rast	(Germany) Jörg Hardt	(Germany) Jan Seyffarth	(Germany) SMS Seyffath-Motorsport
8	(Spain) Circuit de Catalunya National	21 September	(Germany) Jan Seyffarth	(Germany) René Rast	(Germany) Jan Seyffarth	(Germany) SMS Seyffarth-Motorsport
9	(Germany) Hockenheimring	26 October	(Germany) Marco Holzer	(Germany) Marco Holzer	(Germany) Marco Holzer	(Germany) UPS Porsche Junior Team

== Championship standings ==
Points system
**1st**	**2nd**	**3rd**	**4th**	**5th**	**6th**	**7th**	**8th**	**9th**	**10th**	**11th**	**12th**	**13th**	**14th**	**15th**
20	18	16	14	12	10	9	8	7	6	5	4	3	2	1

=== Drivers' championship ===
Pos	Driver	HOC (Germany)	OSC (Germany)	MUG (Italy)	LAU (Germany)	NOR (Germany)	ZAN (Netherlands)	NÜR (Germany)	CAT (Spain)	HOC (Germany)	Pts
1	(Germany) René Rast	**1**	6	2	**2**	2	3	**7**	3	4	139
2	(Germany) Jan Seyffarth	4	4	17	4	4	1	1	**1**	9	123
3	(Germany) Christian Mamerow	2	2	5	6	3	**2**	11	8	7	114
4	(Germany) Jörg Hardt	Ret	**1**	Ret	1	6	5	Ret	5	2	92
5	(Germany) Marco Holzer	20	12	7	10	8	6	3	2	**1**	91
6	(France) Nicolas Armindo	3	3	3	14	**1**	24†	Ret	6	DSQ	90
7	(Austria) Martin Ragginger	9	9	DNS	9	7	7	2	4	8	90
8	(Netherlands) Patrick Huisman	5	5	8	5	Ret	9	6	10	DSQ	67
9	(Germany) Uwe Alzen		Ret	**1**	Ret	5	4	Ret	Ret	3	62
10	(Germany) Thomas Jäger	11	Ret	6	3	Ret	20	8	7	6	59
11	(Czech Republic) Jiří Janák	8	8	4	8	9	Ret	9	25†		53
12	(Germany) Robert Renauer	23†	22	9	DNS	15	16	4	9	5	41
13	(Germany) Mario Josten	21	Ret	10	21	12	10	10	12	15	28
14	(Germany) Christian Abt	10	Ret	Ret	12	Ret	8	19†	15	13	24
15	(Germany) Lance David Arnold							5	24	11	18
16	(Germany) Niclas Kentenich	12	Ret	14	20	10	12	16	21	22	17
17	(Germany) Philipp Wlazik	DSQ	7	19	15	11	Ret	18†	16	18	15
18	(Netherlands) Jeroen Bleekemolen		11		7	Ret					14
19	(Germany) Christian Engelhart	18	Ret	15	11	20	11	Ret	Ret	14	14
20	(Germany) Pascal Kochem	6	13	25†			18				13
21	(Germany) Patrick Hirsch	13	17	DSQ	13	17	15	Ret	11	DNS	13
22	(Sweden) Carl-Olov Carlsson	DSQ	10	22	Ret	23	27†	20†	22	12	11
23	(Switzerland) Ivan Jacoma	DSQ	21	11	18	19	21	13	17	16	9
24	(Netherlands) Tim Buijs	22		16	Ret	13	14	15	13	29	9
25	(Poland) Robert Lukas	15	14	18	Ret	Ret	17	12	Ret	17	8
26	(Germany) Florian Stoll	14	20	24	17	14	13	Ret	Ret	20	8
27	(Netherlands) Mike Verschuur	19	15	12	Ret	22	Ret	Ret	14	21	7
28	(Lithuania) Andzej Dzikevic	Ret	18	13	23	18	22	21†	18	19	3
29	(Germany) Hannes Plesse	Ret	16	Ret	19	16	19	14	19	24	2
30	(Germany) Florian Scholze	16	19		22	Ret	26	Ret	20	23	1
	(Czech Republic) Jiří Mičának	17	23	20	16	Ret	23	Ret	Ret	25	0
	(Russia) Oleg Kesselman	DSQ	24†	21	24	21	25	17	23	27	0
guest drivers ineligible for championship points
	(Australia) Alex Davison	7									0
	(Belgium) David Saelens									10	0
	(Germany) Christoph Schrezenmeier			23							0
	(Germany) Swen Dolenc									26	0
	(Austria) Norbert Schratter									28	0
Pos	Driver	HOC (Germany)	OSC (Germany)	MUG (Italy)	LAU (Germany)	NOR (Germany)	ZAN (Netherlands)	NÜR (Germany)	CAT (Spain)	HOC (Germany)	Pts

Colour	Result
Gold	Winner
Silver	Second place
Bronze	Third place
Green	Points classification
Blue	Non-points classification
Blue	Non-classified finish (NC)
Purple	Retired, not classified (Ret)
Red	Did not qualify (DNQ)
Red	Did not pre-qualify (DNPQ)
Black	Disqualified (DSQ)
White	Did not start (DNS)
White	Withdrew (WD)
White	Race cancelled (C)
Blank	Did not practice (DNP)
Blank	Did not arrive (DNA)
Blank	Excluded (EX)

**Bold** – Pole
Italics – Fastest Lap

† — Drivers did not finish the race, but were classified as they completed over 90% of the race distance.
