= 2007 Porsche Carrera Cup Germany =

Motor racing competition

Seasons
- ← 2006 2008 →

The 2007 Porsche Carrera Cup Deutschland season was the 22nd German Porsche Carrera Cup season. It began on 22 April at Hockenheim and finished on 14 October at the same circuit, after nine races including a double-header at Lausitzring. It ran as a support championship for the 2007 DTM season. Uwe Alzen won the championship for the second time despite not winning any races.

== Teams and drivers ==
Team	No.	Drivers	Rounds
(Germany) UPS Porsche Junior Team	1	(Germany) Lance David Arnold	All
(Germany) UPS Porsche Junior Team	2	(Austria) Martin Ragginger	All
(Germany) ARAXA Racing	3	(United Kingdom) Richard Westbrook	All
(Germany) ARAXA Racing	4	(Switzerland) Michel Frey	All
(Germany) Farnbacher Racing	5	(Germany) Jörg Hardt	1–6
(Germany) Farnbacher Racing	5	(Poland) Damian Sawicki	7
(Germany) Farnbacher Racing	5	(Germany) Niclas Kentenich	8
(Germany) Farnbacher Racing	6	(Czech Republic) Adam Lacko	All
(Germany) Farnbacher Racing	36	(Germany) Mario Kossmehl	1
(Germany) Ahlden Motorsport	7	(Germany) Manfred Ahlden	1–5, 7–8
(Germany) Ahlden Motorsport	7	(Germany) Alexander Roloff	6
(Germany) Ahlden Motorsport	8	(Germany) Niclas Kentenich	1–6
(Germany) Ahlden Motorsport	8	(Germany) Alexander Roloff	7–8
(Germany) Land Motorsport	9	(Russia) Oleg Kesselman	1–6, 8
(Germany) Land Motorsport	9	(Lithuania) Andzej Dzikevic	7
(Germany) Land Motorsport	10	(Germany) Florian Scholze	1–3, 5–6, 8
(Germany) Land Motorsport	10	(Germany) Hermann Speck	4
(Germany) Land Motorsport	10	(Germany) Christian Land	7
(Germany) Land Motorsport	40	(Germany) Patrick Hirsch	6, 8
(Germany) Herberth Motorsport	11	(Germany) Uwe Alzen	All
(Germany) Herberth Motorsport	12	(Germany) Florian Gruber	All
(Germany) B.E.M Brückl Motorsport	13	(Germany) Alfred Renauer	1
(Germany) B.E.M Brückl Motorsport	13	(Germany) Arnold Wagner	2–8
(Germany) B.E.M Brückl Motorsport	24	(Austria) Martin Brückl	All
(Germany) MRS-Team	14	(Germany) René Rast	All
(Germany) MRS-Team	15	(France) Olivier Pla	All
(Turkey) Hermes Attempto Racing	16	(Germany) Mattias Weiland	1
(Turkey) Hermes Attempto Racing	33	(Germany) Philipp Wlazik	All
(Turkey) Hermes Attempto Racing	99	(Turkey) Arda Aka	All
(Germany) Schnabl Engineering	18	(Czech Republic) Jiří Janák	All
(Germany) Schnabl Engineering	19	(Germany) Pierre Kaffer	All
(Germany) Schnabl Engineering	27	(Germany) Christoph Langen	1, 6
(Germany) Schnabl Engineering	27	(Germany) Jörg van Ommen	2, 4
(Germany) Schnabl Engineering	27	(Germany) Roland Rehfeld	3
(Germany) Schnabl Engineering	27	(Switzerland) Marcel Fässler	8
(Germany) Mamerow Racing	20	(Austria) Hannes Neuhauser	1–5
(Germany) Mamerow Racing	20	(Netherlands) Jeroen Bleekemolen	6–7
(Germany) Mamerow Racing	20	(Germany) Oliver Mayer	8
(Germany) Mamerow Racing	21	(Germany) Christian Mamerow	All
(Czech Republic) Mičánek Motorsport	22	(Czech Republic) Jiří Mičánek	All
(Czech Republic) Mičánek Motorsport	23	(Czech Republic) Vladimír Hladík	All
(Germany) Eichin Racing	25	(Germany) Pascal Kochem	All
(Germany) Eichin Racing	26	(Germany) Robert Renauer	All
(Poland) FUCHS-STAR-MOTO Racing	28	(Poland) Maciej Stanco	1–2, 4–5, 7–8
(Poland) FUCHS-STAR-MOTO Racing	29	(Poland) Robert Lukas	All
(Poland) FUCHS-STAR-MOTO Racing	30	(Poland) Bartosz Bajerlein	1–6
(Germany) rhino's Wieth Racing	31	(Germany) Thomas Jäger	All
(Germany) rhino's Wieth Racing	32	(Germany) Marcel Leipert	All
(Germany) SMS Seyffarth-Motorsport	34	(Germany) Jan Seyffarth	All
(Germany) SMS Seyffarth-Motorsport	35	(Germany) Michael Raja	1–4
(Germany) tolimit motorsport	39	(Germany) Christian Menzel	All
(Germany) tolimit motorsport	46	(France) Nicolas Armindo	All
(Germany) tolimit inVenture	43	(Austria) Jörg Peham	8
(Germany) tolimit inVenture	44	(Germany) Stephanie Halm	All
(Germany) tolimit inVenture	45	(Germany) Hannes Plesse	All

== Race calendar and results ==
Round		Circuit	Date	Pole position	Fastest lap	Winning driver	Winning team
1		(Germany) Hockenheimring	22 April	(Germany) Jörg Hardt	(United Kingdom) Richard Westbrook	(United Kingdom) Richard Westbrook	(Germany) ARAXA Racing
2		(Germany) Oschersleben	6 May	(Germany) Jörg Hardt	(Germany) Jörg Hardt	(United Kingdom) Richard Westbrook	(Germany) ARAXA Racing
3	R1	(Germany) EuroSpeedway Lausitz	19 May	(France) Nicolas Armindo	(France) Nicolas Armindo	(France) Nicolas Armindo	(Germany) tolimit motorsport
3	R2	(Germany) EuroSpeedway Lausitz	20 May	(France) Nicolas Armindo	(United Kingdom) Richard Westbrook	(United Kingdom) Richard Westbrook	(Germany) ARAXA Racing
4		(Germany) Norisring	24 June	(Germany) Uwe Alzen	(Germany) Christian Mamerow	(Germany) Christian Menzel	(Germany) tolimit motorsport
5		(Netherlands) Zandvoort	29 July	(France) Olivier Pla	(United Kingdom) Richard Westbrook	(Germany) Christian Mamerow	(Germany) Mamerow Racing
6		(Germany) Nürburgring Short	2 September	(Germany) Christian Mamerow	(Germany) Uwe Alzen	(United Kingdom) Richard Westbrook	(Germany) ARAXA Racing
7		(Spain) Circuit de Catalunya National	23 September	(United Kingdom) Richard Westbrook	(United Kingdom) Richard Westbrook	(United Kingdom) Richard Westbrook	(Germany) ARAXA Racing
8		(Germany) Hockenheimring	14 October	(Germany) Christian Mamerow	(Germany) Christian Mamerow	(Germany) Christian Mamerow	(Germany) Mamerow Racing

== Championship standings ==
Points system
**1st**	**2nd**	**3rd**	**4th**	**5th**	**6th**	**7th**	**8th**	**9th**	**10th**	**11th**	**12th**	**13th**	**14th**	**15th**
20	18	16	14	12	10	9	8	7	6	5	4	3	2	1

=== Drivers' championship ===
Pos	Driver	HOC (Germany)	OSC (Germany)	LAU (Germany)		NOR (Germany)	ZAN (Netherlands)	NÜR (Germany)	CAT (Spain)	HOC (Germany)	Pts
1	(Germany) Uwe Alzen	4	2	3	2	**15**	4	2	6	2	129
2	(United Kingdom) Richard Westbrook	1	1	Ret	1	5	26	1	**1**	4	126
3	(France) Nicolas Armindo	5	3	**1**	**5**	10	8	Ret	2	3	108
4	(Germany) Christian Mamerow	3	5	8	7	3	1	**Ret**	Ret	**1**	101
5	(Germany) Jan Seyffarth	8	4	4	8	9	9	7	7	14	80
6	(Germany) Jörg Hardt	**2**	**25**	2	27†	2	2	Ret			72
7	(Germany) Christian Menzel	6	10	6	10	1	6	DNS	10	15	70
8	(Czech Republic) Jiří Janák	23	12	7	4	4	Ret	30†	3	12	61
9	(Germany) Lance David Arnold	13	8	5	11	8	Ret	Ret	4	11	55
10	(Germany) René Rast	24	Ret	Ret	6	28†	3	4	Ret	5	54
11	(Germany) Thomas Jäger	16	22	9	3	7	10	6	25†	13	53
12	(Germany) Pierre Kaffer	12	11	12	9	Ret	20	5	9	10	48
13	(Austria) Martin Ragginger	11	6	Ret	Ret	Ret	5	11	Ret	6	43
14	(France) Olivier Pla	9	7	Ret	Ret	Ret	**21**	8	8	Ret	34
15	(Germany) Robert Renauer	Ret	16	11	Ret	12	7	14	15	7	33
16	(Germany) Pascal Kochem	10	32†	10	12	11	Ret	15	11	16	29
17	(Czech Republic) Adam Lacko	14	14	15	23	6	14	12	14	DNS	25
18	(Switzerland) Michel Frey	7	Ret	Ret	Ret	13	Ret	9	Ret	35†	20
19	(Germany) Florian Gruber	26	Ret	16	14	18	12	10	Ret	9	20
20	(Germany) Philipp Wlazik	17	13	13	18	26	16	28	12	8	19
21	(Austria) Hannes Neuhauser	Ret	9	14	13	14	13				17
22	(Germany) Marcel Leipert	18	Ret	18	16	Ret	15	13	13	18	10
23	(Germany) Stephanie Halm	22	17	Ret	Ret	16	11	Ret	Ret	20	5
24	(Germany) Hannes Plesse	15	31	17	Ret	Ret	30†	Ret	Ret	21	1
25	(Austria) Martin Brückl	34†	24	21	20	Ret	18	21	16	DNS	1
26	(Germany) Niclas Kentenich	25	18	Ret	Ret	Ret	17	17		17	1
	(Poland) Robert Lukas	Ret	28	20	17	19	22	18	18	19	0
	(Germany) Manfred Ahlden	32	19	19	26	17	24		Ret	31	0
	(Poland) Maciej Stanco	33†	21			Ret	19		17	26	0
	(Czech Republic) Jiří Mičánek	20	20	22	19	Ret	23	20	19	23	0
	(Russia) Oleg Kesselman	28	DNS	26	28	20	28	29		30	0
	(Turkey) Arda Aka	29	26	24	21	22	27	23	21	34	0
	(Germany) Michael Raja	27	23	23	22	21					0
	(Poland) Bartosz Bajerlein	31†	27	27	24	23	Ret	26			0
	(Germany) Florian Scholze	Ret	29	28†	Ret		25	22		29	0
	(Germany) Arnold Wagner		33	Ret	Ret	25	29	25	22	32	0
	(Czech Republic) Vladimír Hladík	Ret	30†	Ret	25	27†	Ret	27	24	33	0
guest drivers ineligible for championship points
	(Netherlands) Jeroen Bleekemolen							3	5		0
	(Germany) Jörg van Ommen		15			Ret					0
	(Germany) Roland Rehfeld			25	15						0
	(Germany) Alexander Roloff							16	Ret	24	0
	(Germany) Patrick Hirsch							19		22	0
	(Germany) Mario Kossmehl	19									0
	(Germany) Christian Land								20		0
	(Germany) Alfred Renauer	21									0
	(Poland) Damian Sawicki								23		0
	(Germany) Christoph Langen	Ret						24			0
	(Germany) Hermann Speck					24					0
	(Germany) Oliver Mayer									25	0
	(Switzerland) Marcel Fässler									27	0
	(Austria) Jörg Peham									28	0
	(Germany) Matthias Weiland	30									0
	(Lithuania) Andzej Dzikevic								Ret		0
Pos	Driver	HOC (Germany)	OSC (Germany)	LAU (Germany)		NOR (Germany)	ZAN (Netherlands)	NÜR (Germany)	CAT (Spain)	HOC (Germany)	Pts

Colour	Result
Gold	Winner
Silver	Second place
Bronze	Third place
Green	Points classification
Blue	Non-points classification
Blue	Non-classified finish (NC)
Purple	Retired, not classified (Ret)
Red	Did not qualify (DNQ)
Red	Did not pre-qualify (DNPQ)
Black	Disqualified (DSQ)
White	Did not start (DNS)
White	Withdrew (WD)
White	Race cancelled (C)
Blank	Did not practice (DNP)
Blank	Did not arrive (DNA)
Blank	Excluded (EX)

**Bold** – Pole
Italics – Fastest Lap

† — Drivers did not finish the race, but were classified as they completed over 90% of the race distance.
