= 2013 VLN Series =

Motorsport season

Seasons
- ← 2012 2014 →

The 2013 VLN Series was the 36th season of the VLN.

The drivers championship was won by Dirk Groneck and Tim Groneck, driving a Renault Clio for Groneck Motorsport.

The fourth race was marred by the death of 55-year-old German driver Wolfgang Dess, who raced under the nom de course "Wolf Silvester". While in contention for victory in the CUP1 class, he was seen to lose control of his No. 350 Opel Astra OPC before the car came to a rest at Schwalbenschwanz. Marshals found him motionless in the driver's seat. Numerous attempts were made to resuscitate him at the trackside and on the way to the circuit's medical centre, but he was later pronounced dead by the chief medical officer. It is suspected that Dess suffered a heart attack while racing.

== Calendar ==
Rnd.	Race	Length	Circuit	Date
1	60. ADAC Westfalenfahrt	4 hours	(Germany) Nürburgring Nordschleife	March 23
2	38. DMV 4-Stunden-Rennen	4 hours	(Germany) Nürburgring Nordschleife	April 13
3	55. ADAC ACAS H&R-Cup	4 hours	(Germany) Nürburgring Nordschleife	April 27
4	44. Adenauer ADAC Simfy Trophy	4 hours (Note: The race was stopped after 2 hours 38 minutes due to the death of "Wolf Silvester".)	(Germany) Nürburgring Nordschleife	June 22
5	53. ADAC Reinoldus-Langstreckenrennen	4 hours	(Germany) Nürburgring Nordschleife	July 20
6	Opel 6 Stunden ADAC Ruhr-Pokal-Rennen	6 hours	(Germany) Nürburgring Nordschleife	August 24
7	36. RCM DMV Grenzlandrennen	4 hours (Note: The race was stopped after 3 hours 50 minutes due to safety reasons, after heavy rain hit the circuit.)	(Germany) Nürburgring Nordschleife	September 14
8	45. ADAC Barbarossapreis	4 hours	(Germany) Nürburgring Nordschleife	September 28
9	ROWE DMV 250-Meilen-Rennen	4 hours	(Germany) Nürburgring Nordschleife	October 12
10	38. DMV Münsterlandpokal	4 hours	(Germany) Nürburgring Nordschleife	October 26

== Race results ==
Results indicate overall winners only.

Rnd	Circuit	Pole position	Winners
1	(Germany) Nürburgring Nordschleife	Event cancelled due to snow	
2	(Germany) Nürburgring Nordschleife	No. 30 (Germany) MSC Adenau e.V. im ADAC	No. 19 (Germany) Team Schubert
2	(Germany) Nürburgring Nordschleife	(Germany) Klaus Abbelen (Germany) Sabine Schmitz (Netherlands) Patrick Huisman	(Germany) Dirk Müller (Germany) Jörg Müller (Brazil) Augusto Farfus
3	(Germany) Nürburgring Nordschleife	No. 2 (Germany) H&R Spezialfedern	No. 5 (Germany) Phoenix Racing
3	(Germany) Nürburgring Nordschleife	(Germany) Uwe Alzen (Germany) Philipp Wlazik (Greece) (Germany) Alexandros Margaritis	(Switzerland) Marcel Fässler (Germany) Frank Stippler
4	(Germany) Nürburgring Nordschleife	No. 45 (Germany) Timbuli Racing	No. 15 (Germany) Phoenix Racing
4	(Germany) Nürburgring Nordschleife	(Austria) Norbert Siedler (Germany) Marco Seefried (Germany) Marc Basseng	(Germany) Frank Stippler (Germany) Ferdinand Stuck (Germany) Johannes Stuck
5	(Germany) Nürburgring Nordschleife	No. 2 (Germany) H&R Spezialfedern	No. 30 (Germany) MSC Adenau e.V. im ADAC
5	(Germany) Nürburgring Nordschleife	(Germany) Uwe Alzen (Germany) Philipp Wlazik (Greece) (Germany) Alexandros Margaritis	(Germany) Klaus Abbelen (Netherlands) Patrick Huisman (France) Patrick Pilet
6	(Germany) Nürburgring Nordschleife	No. 37 (Germany) G-Drive Racing by Phoenix	No. 7 (Germany) Rowe Racing
6	(Germany) Nürburgring Nordschleife	(Germany) Frank Stippler (Germany) Marc Basseng (Russia) Roman Rusinov	(Germany) Jan Seyffarth (Germany) Nico Bastian (Germany) Lance David Arnold
7	(Germany) Nürburgring Nordschleife	No. 2 (Germany) H&R Spezialfedern	No. 145 (Germany) Manthey Racing
7	(Germany) Nürburgring Nordschleife	(Germany) Uwe Alzen (Germany) Philipp Wlazik (Germany) Niclas Kentenich	(Germany) Jochen Krumbach (Germany) Jörg Bergmeister (Germany) Lucas Luhr
8	(Germany) Nürburgring Nordschleife	No. 2 (Germany) H&R Spezialfedern	No. 25 (Belgium) Team Marc VDS
8	(Germany) Nürburgring Nordschleife	(Germany) Uwe Alzen (Germany) Philipp Wlazik (Germany) Niclas Kentenich	(Belgium) Maxime Martin (Netherlands) Nicky Catsburg
9	(Germany) Nürburgring Nordschleife	No. 23 (Germany) Dörr Motorsport	No. 44 (Germany) Twin Busch Motorsport
9	(Germany) Nürburgring Nordschleife	(Germany) Rudi Adams (Germany) Arno Klasen	(Germany) Dennis Busch (Germany) Marc Busch
10	(Germany) Nürburgring Nordschleife	No. 37 (Germany) Phoenix Racing	No. 37 (Germany) Phoenix Racing
10	(Germany) Nürburgring Nordschleife	(Germany) Marc Basseng (Belgium) Laurens Vanthoor (Germany) Christian Mamerow	(Germany) Marc Basseng (Belgium) Laurens Vanthoor (Germany) Christian Mamerow

== See also ==
- 2013 24 Hours of Nürburgring

== Bibliography ==
- Jörg Hildebrand & Hasso Jacoby. Grüne Hölle 2013: Die Langstreckenrennen auf dem Nürburgring (in German). Hackethal Verlag. ISBN 978-3-936285-40-6.
