= 2010 Porsche Carrera Cup Germany =

Motor racing competition

Seasons
- ← 2009 2011 →

The 2010 Porsche Carrera Cup Deutschland season was the 25th German Porsche Carrera Cup season. It began on 25 April at Hockenheim and finished on 17 October at the same circuit, after nine races. It ran as a support championship for the 2010 DTM season. Frenchman Nicolas Armindo won the championship despite runner-up Nick Tandy winning more races. He also became the first non-German to win the championship.

== Teams and drivers ==
Team	No.	Drivers	Rounds
(Germany) Porsche AG	1	(United Kingdom) Chris Harris	9
(Germany) Herberth Motorsport	3	(Germany) Uwe Alzen	All
(Germany) Herberth Motorsport	4	(Germany) Robert Renauer	All
(Germany) Farnbacher Racing	5	(Germany) Niclas Kentenich	1–5
(Germany) Farnbacher Racing	5	(Germany) René Rast	8–9
(Germany) Farnbacher Racing	6	(Austria) Ferdinand Stuck	1–5, 8–9
(Germany) Schnabl Engineering	7	(Germany) Hannes Plesse	All
(Germany) Schnabl Engineering	8	(Germany) Stefan Wendt	All
(Germany) Schnabl Engineering	17	(Austria) Martin Ragginger	All
(Poland) Förch Racing	9	(Poland) Robert Lukas	All
(Poland) Förch Racing	10	(Poland) Stefan Bilinski	1–4, 6
(Poland) Förch Racing	10	(Slovakia) Stefan Rosina	5, 7–9
(Germany) Seyffarth Motorsport	11	(Russia) David Sigacev	All
(Germany) Seyffarth Motorsport	12	(Germany) David Mengesdorf	All
(Germany) Seyffarth Motorsport	14	(Austria) Clemens Schmid	All
(Germany) Seyffarth Motorsport	15	(Germany) Jan Seyffarth	9
(Germany) Team Deutsche Post by tolimit	18	(Germany) Sascha Maassen	1, 3–6, 8–9
(Germany) Team Deutsche Post by tolimit	19	(United Kingdom) Sean Edwards	1, 3–6, 8–9
(Austria) Konrad Motorsport	20	(United Kingdom) Nick Tandy	All
(Austria) Konrad Motorsport	21	(Latvia) Harald Schlegelmilch	1–6
(Austria) Konrad Motorsport	21	(Netherlands) Jeroen Bleekemolen	7
(Austria) Konrad Motorsport	21	(Austria) Andreas Mayerl	8–9
(Austria) Konrad Motorsport	26	(Germany) Heinz-Bert Wolters	5
(Austria) Konrad Motorsport	26	(Netherlands) Jaap van Lagen	6
(Austria) Konrad Motorsport	26	(Austria) Andreas Mayerl	7
(Austria) Konrad Motorsport	26	(Sweden) Oscar Palm	9
(Germany) MRS Team	22	(Germany) Christian Engelhart	All
(Germany) MRS Team	24	(Germany) Tim Sandtler	1–3
(Germany) MRS Team	24	(Turkey) Yucel Özbek	5
(Germany) MRS Team	24	(Netherlands) Olivier Tielemans	6
(Germany) MRS Team	24	(Sweden) Jocke Mangs	8
(Germany) MRS Team	25	(Turkey) Yadel Oskan	5
(Germany) MRS Team	30	(Italy) Francesco Castellacci	2
(Netherlands) Harders Plaza Racing	31	(Netherlands) Robert van den Berg	9
(Netherlands) Harders Plaza Racing	32	(Netherlands) Tom Langeberg	9
(Turkey) Hermes Attempto Racing	66	(Germany) Florian Scholze	9
(Turkey) Hermes Attempto Racing	77	(Germany) Florian Scholze	2–8
(Turkey) Hermes Attempto Racing	77	(Netherlands) Jeroen Bleekemolen	9
(Turkey) Hermes Attempto Racing	88	(Germany) Philipp Wlazik	All
(Turkey) Hermes Attempto Racing	99	(France) Nicolas Armindo	All

== Race calendar and results ==
Round	Circuit	Date	Pole position	Fastest lap	Winning driver	Winning team
1	(Germany) Hockenheimring	25 April	(United Kingdom) Nick Tandy	(United Kingdom) Sean Edwards	(United Kingdom) Nick Tandy	(Austria) Konrad Motorsport
2	(Spain) Circuit Ricardo Tormo	23 May	(United Kingdom) Nick Tandy	(France) Nicolas Armindo	(United Kingdom) Nick Tandy	(Austria) Konrad Motorsport
3	(Germany) EuroSpeedway Lausitz	6 June	(France) Nicolas Armindo	(France) Nicolas Armindo	(France) Nicolas Armindo	(Turkey) Hermes Attempto Racing
4	(Germany) Norisring	4 July	(France) Nicolas Armindo	(United Kingdom) Nick Tandy	(France) Nicolas Armindo	(Turkey) Hermes Attempto Racing
5	(Germany) Nürburgring Short	8 August	(France) Nicolas Armindo	(France) Nicolas Armindo	(France) Nicolas Armindo	(Turkey) Hermes Attempto Racing
6	(Netherlands) Zandvoort	22 August	(United Kingdom) Nick Tandy	(United Kingdom) Nick Tandy	(United Kingdom) Nick Tandy	(Austria) Konrad Motorsport
7	(United Kingdom) Brands Hatch	5 September	(United Kingdom) Nick Tandy	(United Kingdom) Nick Tandy	(United Kingdom) Nick Tandy	(Austria) Konrad Motorsport
8	(Germany) Oschersleben	19 September	(United Kingdom) Nick Tandy	(United Kingdom) Nick Tandy	(United Kingdom) Nick Tandy	(Austria) Konrad Motorsport
9	(Germany) Hockenheimring	17 October	(Germany) René Rast	(Netherlands) Jeroen Bleekemolen	(Germany) Christian Engelhart	(Germany) MRS Team

== Championship standings ==
Points system
**1st**	**2nd**	**3rd**	**4th**	**5th**	**6th**	**7th**	**8th**	**9th**	**10th**	**11th**	**12th**	**13th**	**14th**	**15th**
20	18	16	14	12	10	9	8	7	6	5	4	3	2	1

=== Drivers' championship ===
Pos	Driver	HOC (Germany)	VAL (Spain)	LAU (Germany)	NOR (Germany)	NÜR (Germany)	ZAN (Netherlands)	BRH (United Kingdom)	OSC (Germany)	HOC (Germany)	Pts
1	(France) Nicolas Armindo	11	2	**1**	**1**	**1**	10	2	2	5	142
2	(United Kingdom) Nick Tandy	**1**	**1**	2	16	16	**1**	**1**	**1**	Ret	121
3	(Germany) Uwe Alzen	4	6	11	2	3	3	13	5	Ret	98
4	(Germany) Robert Renauer	5	4	6	9	7	4	7	3	Ret	96
5	(Austria) Martin Ragginger	3	Ret	3	3	DNS	8	14†	Ret	4	79
6	(Germany) Philipp Wlazik	6	7	9	Ret	6	6	12	8	6	77
7	(Germany) Christian Engelhart	18†	Ret	4	17†	5	13	4	11	1	72
8	(United Kingdom) Sean Edwards	10		14	4	2	5		4	Ret	68
9	(Germany) Sascha Maassen	7		Ret	5	4	7		7	7	67
10	(Poland) Robert Lukas	Ret	3	5	Ret	20	17	8	9	9	55
11	(Germany) Stefan Wendt	12	8	7	10	21	Ret	5	Ret	11	49
12	(Germany) David Mengesdorf	13	Ret	12	6	11	9	11	18†	8	49
13	(Germany) Niclas Kentenich	2	5	16	7	13					43
14	(Russia) David Sigacev	8	15	Ret	8	10	12	9	14	Ret	42
15	(Germany) Hannes Plesse	Ret	10	8	11	12	15	Ret	17	13	35
16	(Germany) Florian Scholze		9	10	12	22	14	Ret	10	Ret	27
17	(Latvia) Harald Schlegelmilch	9	Ret	18†	14	8	11				23
18	(Austria) Clemens Schmid	14	16	15	13	17†	16	10	12	Ret	23
19	(Austria) Ferdinand Stuck	15	12	17	Ret	19			13	Ret	10
20	(Germany) Tim Sandtler	16	11	13							8
21	(Poland) Stefan Bilinski	17	13	Ret	15		Ret				4
guest drivers ineligible for championship points
	(Netherlands) Jeroen Bleekemolen							3		2	0
	(Netherlands) Jaap van Lagen						2				0
	(Germany) Jan Seyffarth									3	0
	(Slovakia) Stefan Rosina					9		6	6	Ret	0
	(Sweden) Oscar Palm									10	0
	(Austria) Andreas Mayerl							Ret	16	12	0
	(Italy) Francesco Castellacci		14								0
	(Germany) Heinz-Bert Wolters					14					0
	(United Kingdom) Chris Harris									14	0
	(Turkey) Yucel Özbek					15					0
	(Sweden) Jocke Mangs								15		0
	(Netherlands) Tom Langeberg									15	0
	(Netherlands) Robert van den Berg									16†	0
	(Turkey) Yadel Oskan					18					0
	(Netherlands) Olivier Tielemans						18				0
	(Germany) René Rast								Ret	**Ret**	0
Pos	Driver	HOC (Germany)	VAL (Spain)	LAU (Germany)	NOR (Germany)	NÜR (Germany)	ZAN (Netherlands)	BRH (United Kingdom)	OSC (Germany)	HOC (Germany)	Pts

Colour	Result
Gold	Winner
Silver	Second place
Bronze	Third place
Green	Points classification
Blue	Non-points classification
Blue	Non-classified finish (NC)
Purple	Retired, not classified (Ret)
Red	Did not qualify (DNQ)
Red	Did not pre-qualify (DNPQ)
Black	Disqualified (DSQ)
White	Did not start (DNS)
White	Withdrew (WD)
White	Race cancelled (C)
Blank	Did not practice (DNP)
Blank	Did not arrive (DNA)
Blank	Excluded (EX)

**Bold** – Pole
Italics – Fastest Lap

† — Drivers did not finish the race, but were classified as they completed over 90% of the race distance.
