= 2009 Porsche Carrera Cup Germany =

Motor racing competition

Seasons
- ← 2008 2010 →

The 2009 Porsche Carrera Cup Deutschland season was the 24th German Porsche Carrera Cup season. It began on 17 May at Hockenheim and finished on 25 October at the same circuit, after nine races. It ran as a support championship for the 2009 DTM season. Thomas Jäger won the championship with 5 points more than Jeroen Bleekemolen.

== Teams and drivers ==
Team	No.	Drivers	Rounds
(Germany) MS Racing	1	(Germany) Thomas Jäger	All
(Germany) MS Racing	2	(Germany) Florian Stoll	All
(Germany) MS Racing	12	(Germany) Florian Scholze	1–6, 9
(Germany) MS Racing	12	(Germany) Hubert Haupt	7
(Germany) MS Racing	12	(France) Renauld Derlot	8
(Germany) ARAXA Racing	3	(Netherlands) Jeroen Bleekemolen	All
(Germany) ARAXA Racing	4	(Sweden) Carl-Olov Carlsson	1–2
(Germany) ARAXA Racing	4	(France) Nicolas Armindo	3, 6, 8
(Germany) ARAXA Racing	4	(Netherlands) Sebastiaan Bleekemolen	4
(Germany) ARAXA Racing	4	(Switzerland) Raffi Bader	5
(Germany) ARAXA Racing	4	(United Kingdom) Richard Westbrook	6
(Germany) ARAXA Racing	4	(Germany) Ellen Lohr	7–9
(Germany) ARAXA Racing	24	(Switzerland) Rolf Ineichen	8
(Germany) Farnbacher Racing	5	(Germany) Robert Renauer	All
(Austria) Konrad Motorsport	7	(Spain) Siso Cunill	1, 7
(Austria) Konrad Motorsport	7	(Brazil) Valdeno Brito	2–6
(Austria) Konrad Motorsport	7	(United Kingdom) Nick Tandy	8
(Austria) Konrad Motorsport	8	(Germany) Patrick Hirsch	All
(Germany) Schnabl Engineering	10	(Germany) Sebastian Asch	All
(Germany) Schnabl Engineering	11	(Germany) Hannes Plesse	All
(Germany) Schnabl Engineering	21	(Poland) Robert Lukas	1, 4–7
(Germany) MRS Team	14	(Germany) Christian Engelhart	All
(Germany) MRS Team	15	(Germany) Frank Kechele	5–6
(Germany) MRS Team	15	(Turkey) Yucel Özbek	7
(Germany) MRS Team	16	(Spain) Isaac Tutumlu	7
(Germany) tolimit/Seyffarth Motorsport	18	(Germany) Jan Seyffarth	1–7
(Germany) tolimit/Seyffarth Motorsport	18	(United Arab Emirates) Khaled Al Qubaisi	9
(Germany) tolimit/Seyffarth Motorsport	19	(Germany) Niclas Kentenich	All
(Germany) tolimit/Seyffarth Motorsport	20	(Russia) David Sigachev	All
(Germany) tolimit/Seyffarth Motorsport	41	(Germany) Stefan Wendt	5
(Austria) Walter Lechner Racing School	23	(Slovakia) Štefan Rosina	1
(Germany) Highspeed Racing Heilbronn	25	(Germany) Thomas Langer	5, 9
(Germany) Highspeed Racing Heilbronn	26	(Germany) Roland Ziegler	5, 9
(Germany) Land Motorsport	27	(Germany) Hermann Speck	3
(Germany) Land Motorsport	27	(France) Nicolas Armindo	6
(Germany) HMS servicesicher	28	(Germany) Christoph Schrezenmeier	5, 9
(Germany) HMS servicesicher	29	(Germany) Alfred Renauer	5, 9
(Germany) HMS servicesicher	30	(Germany) Dominik Neumeyr	9
(Germany) Swen Dolenc	31	(Germany) Swen Dolenc	9
(Turkey) Hermes Attempto Racing	66	(Denmark) Nicki Thiim	All
(Turkey) Hermes Attempto Racing	77	(Sweden) Jimmy Johansson	All
(Turkey) Hermes Attempto Racing	88	(Czech Republic) Jiří Janák	1–6
(Turkey) Hermes Attempto Racing	88	(United Kingdom) Sean Edwards	7, 9
(Turkey) Hermes Attempto Racing	99	(Germany) Philipp Wlazik	All

== Race calendar and results ==
Round	Circuit	Date	Pole position	Fastest lap	Winning driver	Winning team
1	(Germany) Hockenheimring	17 May	(Germany) Jan Seyffarth	(Germany) Jan Seyffarth	(Germany) Jan Seyffarth	(Germany) tolimit/Seyffarth Motorsport
2	(Germany) EuroSpeedway Lausitz	31 May	(Germany) Thomas Jäger	(Germany) Thomas Jäger	(Germany) Thomas Jäger	(Germany) MS Racing
3	(Germany) Norisring	28 June	(Germany) Thomas Jäger	(Denmark) Nicki Thiim	(Germany) Thomas Jäger	(Germany) MS Racing
4	(Netherlands) Zandvoort	19 July	(Netherlands) Jeroen Bleekemolen	(Netherlands) Jeroen Bleekemolen	(Netherlands) Jeroen Bleekemolen	(Germany) ARAXA Racing
5	(Germany) Oschersleben	2 August	(Germany) Jan Seyffarth	(Germany) Thomas Jäger	(Germany) Jan Seyffarth	(Germany) tolimit/Seyffarth Motorsport
6	(Germany) Nürburgring Short	16 August	(Germany) Jan Seyffarth	(Czech Republic) Jiří Janák	(Germany) Thomas Jäger	(Germany) MS Racing
7	(Spain) Circuit de Catalunya National	20 September	(Germany) Robert Renauer	(Netherlands) Jeroen Bleekemolen	(Netherlands) Jeroen Bleekemolen	(Germany) ARAXA Racing
8	(France) Dijon-Prenois	11 October	(Netherlands) Jeroen Bleekemolen	(France) Renauld Derlot	(Netherlands) Jeroen Bleekemolen	(Germany) ARAXA Racing
9	(Germany) Hockenheimring	25 October	(Netherlands) Jeroen Bleekemolen	(Netherlands) Jeroen Bleekemolen	(Netherlands) Jeroen Bleekemolen	(Germany) ARAXA Racing

== Championship standings ==
Points system
**1st**	**2nd**	**3rd**	**4th**	**5th**	**6th**	**7th**	**8th**	**9th**	**10th**	**11th**	**12th**	**13th**	**14th**	**15th**
20	18	16	14	12	10	9	8	7	6	5	4	3	2	1

=== Drivers' championship ===
Pos	Driver	HOC (Germany)	LAU (Germany)	NOR (Germany)	ZAN (Netherlands)	OSC (Germany)	NÜR (Germany)	CAT (Spain)	DIJ (France)	HOC (Germany)	Pts
1	(Germany) Thomas Jäger	2	**1**	**1**	8	2	1	6	3	4	152
2	(Netherlands) Jeroen Bleekemolen	3	4	8	**1**	4	4	1	**1**	**1**	147
3	(Germany) Jan Seyffarth	**1**	2	5	3	**1**	**3**	Ret			104
4	(Germany) Robert Renauer	6	5	9	9	3	2	**2**	16	7	104
5	(Denmark) Nicki Thiim	4	3	6	4	12	17	12	4	5	99
6	(Sweden) Jimmy Johansson	13	9	Ret	2	DNS	9	4	14	10	66
7	(Germany) Sebastian Asch	14	7	13	5	5	11	Ret	8	Ret	58
8	(Germany) Florian Stoll	Ret	Ret	14	11	10	6	13	9	6	56
9	(Germany) Christian Engelhart	12	Ret	Ret	15†	9	8	Ret	6	3	54
10	(Brazil) Valdeno Brito		6	2	12	7	7				51
11	(Germany) Philipp Wlazik	16	Ret	7	16	11	Ret	7	11	8	45
12	(Germany) Hannes Plesse	5	11	Ret	14	6	13	Ret	12	DNS	40
13	(Russia) David Sigachev	11	Ret	11	6	18	10	Ret	10	Ret	38
14	(Czech Republic) Jiří Janák	15	8	4	13	13	15				34
15	(Germany) Niclas Kentenich	8	Ret	Ret	7	17	14	Ret	Ret	9	30
16	(Germany) Patrick Hirsch	10	Ret	10	18†	22	Ret	11	17	Ret	28
17	(Poland) Robert Lukas	9			10	8	12	Ret			27
18	(Germany) Florian Scholze	Ret	10	12	Ret	15	16			16	20
	(Sweden) Carl-Olav Carlsson	Ret	Ret								0
guest drivers ineligible for championship points
	(United Kingdom) Sean Edwards							5		2	0
	(United Kingdom) Nick Tandy								2		0
	(France) Nicolas Armindo			3			Ret		7		0
	(Spain) Siso Cunill	Ret						3			0
	(United Kingdom) Richard Westbrook						5				0
	(France) Renauld Derlot								5		0
	(Slovakia) Štefan Rosina	7									0
	(Germany) Hubert Haupt							8			0
	(Germany) Ellen Lohr							9	13	11	0
	(Turkey) Yucel Özbek							10			0
	(Germany) Christoph Schrezenmeier					19				12	0
	(Germany) Swen Dolenc									13	0
	(Germany) Tomas Langer					Ret				14	0
	(Switzerland) Raffi Bader					14					0
	(Germany) Roland Ziegler					20				15	0
	(Germany) Hermann Speck			15							0
	(Switzerland) Rolf Ineichen								15		0
	(Germany) Frank Kechele					16	Ret				0
	(Germany) Alfred Renauer					21				17†	0
	(Netherlands) Sebastiaan Bleekemolen				17†						0
	(Germany) Stefan Wendt					Ret					0
	(Spain) Isaac Tutumlu							Ret			0
	(Germany) Dominik Neumeyer									Ret	0
	(United Arab Emirates) Khaled Al Qubaisi									Ret	0
Pos	Driver	HOC (Germany)	LAU (Germany)	NOR (Germany)	ZAN (Netherlands)	OSC (Germany)	NÜR (Germany)	CAT (Spain)	DIJ (France)	HOC (Germany)	Pts

Colour	Result
Gold	Winner
Silver	Second place
Bronze	Third place
Green	Points classification
Blue	Non-points classification
Blue	Non-classified finish (NC)
Purple	Retired, not classified (Ret)
Red	Did not qualify (DNQ)
Red	Did not pre-qualify (DNPQ)
Black	Disqualified (DSQ)
White	Did not start (DNS)
White	Withdrew (WD)
White	Race cancelled (C)
Blank	Did not practice (DNP)
Blank	Did not arrive (DNA)
Blank	Excluded (EX)

**Bold** – Pole
Italics – Fastest Lap

† — Drivers did not finish the race, but were classified as they completed over 90% of the race distance.
