= 2011 Porsche Carrera Cup Germany =

Motor racing competition

Seasons
- ← 2010 2012 →

The 2011 Porsche Carrera Cup Deutschland season was the 26th German Porsche Carrera Cup season. It began on 1 May at Hockenheim and finished on 23 October at the same circuit, after nine races. It ran as a support championship for the 2011 DTM season. British driver Nick Tandy won the championship ahead of his other countryman Sean Edwards becoming the first British driver to win the championship.

== Teams and drivers ==
Team	No.	Drivers	Rounds
(Austria) Konrad Motorsport	2	(United Kingdom) Nick Tandy	All
(Austria) Konrad Motorsport	22	(Germany) Klaus Abbelen	7
(Austria) Konrad Motorsport	22	(Germany) Christian Engelhart	8–9
(Austria) Konrad Motorsport	27	(Austria) Johann Ledermair	1–4, 6
(Austria) Konrad Motorsport	42	(Germany) Heinz-Bert Wolters	9
(Germany) Alzen Automotive	3	(Germany) Uwe Alzen	1–5, 7, 9
(Germany) Alzen Automotive	4	(Germany) David Jahn	3–4, 7, 9
(Germany) Alzen Automotive	204	(United States) Mark Bullitt	5
(Germany) Land Motorsport	5	(Netherlands) Jaap van Lagen	All
(Germany) Land Motorsport	40	(Germany) Andreas Iburg	9
(Germany) Land Motorsport	805	(New Zealand) Peter Scharmach	5
(Germany) Land Motorsport	806	(Canada) Perry Bortolotti	5
(Poland) Aust Motorsport	7	(Poland) Damian Sawicki	1–2
(Poland) Aust Motorsport	7	(Austria) Norbert Siedler	3–7, 9
(Poland) Aust Motorsport	7	(Germany) Philipp Wlazik	8
(Poland) Aust Motorsport	34	(Czech Republic) Tomáš Pivoda	9
(Poland) Aust Motorsport	207	(Germany) Jan-Erik Slooten	5
(Poland) Förch Racing	9	(Poland) Robert Lukas	1–4, 6–9
(Poland) Förch Racing	10	(Germany) René Rast	1, 3–9
(Poland) Förch Racing	17	(Germany) Florian Scholze	3–4, 6–9
(Poland) Förch Racing	18	(Poland) Damian Sawicki	4, 6–7
(Poland) Förch Racing	18	(Germany) Philipp Wlazik	9
(Germany) Seyffarth Motorsport	11	(Germany) Jan Seyffarth	All
(Germany) Seyffarth Motorsport	12	(Germany) Kris Heidorn	All
(Germany) Team Deutsche Post by tolimit	15	(Netherlands) Jeroen Bleekemolen	1–6, 9
(Germany) Team Deutsche Post by tolimit	15	(Germany) Christopher Mies	7
(Germany) Team Deutsche Post by tolimit	15	(Germany) Robert Renauer	8
(Germany) Team Deutsche Post by tolimit	16	(United Kingdom) Sean Edwards	All
(Germany) Herberth Motorsport	19	(Austria) Clemens Schmid	All
(Germany) Herberth Motorsport	20	(Germany) Robert Renauer	1, 4, 9
(Germany) Herberth Motorsport	20	(Germany) Christoph Schrezenmeier	3
(Germany) Herberth Motorsport	802	(Germany) Jürgen Gerlach	5
(Germany) Schnabl Engineering	23	(Austria) Martin Ragginger	2–7, 9
(Germany) Schnabl Engineering	23	(Germany) Hannes Plesse	8
(Germany) Schnabl Engineering	803	(Hong Kong) Darryl O'Young	5
(Germany) Pistenclub e.V.	30	(Germany) Christopher Gerhard	7
(Sweden) Kristofferson Motorsport	30	(Sweden) Johan Kristoffersson	9
(Sweden) Mats Karlsson	31	(Sweden) Mats Karlsson	9
(Germany) SPS automotive-performance	32	(France) Kévin Estre	9
(Germany) SPS automotive-performance	43	(Germany) Bill Barazetti	9
(Germany) SPS automotive-performance	804	(Australia) Greg Ross	5
(Germany) MRS Racing PZ Aschaffenburg	34	(Austria) Philipp Eng	9
(Germany) MRS Racing PZ Aschaffenburg	41	(Switzerland) Raffi Bader	9
(Turkey) Hermes Attempto Racing	66	(Germany) Stefan Wendt	All
(Turkey) Hermes Attempto Racing	77	(Switzerland) Philipp Frommenwiler	All
(Turkey) Hermes Attempto Racing	88	(Denmark) Nicki Thiim	All
(Turkey) Hermes Attempto Racing	99	(France) Nicolas Armindo	1–5, 7–9
(Turkey) Hermes Attempto Racing	99	(France) Kévin Estre	6
(Germany) Porsche AG	200	(New Zealand) Craig Baird	5
(Germany) Haribo Racing Team	801	(Germany) Jochen Krumbach	5
(Germany) Haribo Racing Team	888	(Germany) Hans-Guido Reigel	5

== Race calendar and results ==
Round	Circuit	Date	Pole position	Fastest lap	Winning driver	Winning team
1	(Germany) Hockenheimring	1 May	(Germany) Robert Renauer	(France) Nicolas Armindo	(United Kingdom) Nick Tandy	(Austria) Konrad Motorsport
2	(Netherlands) Zandvoort	15 May	(Netherlands) Jeroen Bleekemolen	(Netherlands) Jeroen Bleekemolen	(Netherlands) Jeroen Bleekemolen	(Germany) Team Deutsche Post by tolimit
3	(Austria) Red Bull Ring	5 June	(Netherlands) Jaap van Lagen	(Netherlands) Jaap van Lagen	(Netherlands) Jaap van Lagen	(Germany) Land Motorsport
4	(Germany) Lausitzring	19 June	(Denmark) Nicki Thiim	(Germany) Robert Renauer	(Denmark) Nicki Thiim	(Turkey) Hermes Attempto Racing
5	(Germany) Nürburgring Nordschleife	25 June	(Austria) Norbert Siedler	(Germany) René Rast	(Germany) René Rast	(Poland) Förch Racing
6	(Germany) Norisring	3 July	(United Kingdom) Nick Tandy	(Denmark) Nicki Thiim	(United Kingdom) Sean Edwards	(Germany) Team Deutsche Post with tolimit
7	(Germany) Nürburgring Short	7 August	(United Kingdom) Sean Edwards	(Netherlands) Jaap van Lagen	(United Kingdom) Nick Tandy	(Austria) Konrad Motorsport
8	(Germany) Oschersleben	18 September	(Denmark) Nicki Thiim	(Denmark) Nicki Thiim	(United Kingdom) Nick Tandy	(Austria) Konrad Motorsport
9	(Germany) Hockenheimring	23 October	(United Kingdom) Nick Tandy	(Germany) Uwe Alzen	(United Kingdom) Sean Edwards	(Germany) Team Deutsche Post by tolimit

== Championship standings ==
Points system
**1st**	**2nd**	**3rd**	**4th**	**5th**	**6th**	**7th**	**8th**	**9th**	**10th**	**11th**	**12th**	**13th**	**14th**	**15th**
20	18	16	14	12	10	9	8	7	6	5	4	3	2	1

=== Drivers' championship ===
Pos	Driver	HOC (Germany)	ZAN (Netherlands)	RBR (Austria)	LAU (Germany)	NNS (Germany)	NOR (Germany)	NÜR (Germany)	OSC (Germany)	HOC (Germany)	Pts
1	(United Kingdom) Nick Tandy	1	3	2	3	Ret	**5**	1	1	**3**	138
2	(United Kingdom) Sean Edwards	3	5	3	2	3	1	**18**	5	1	130
3	(Netherlands) Jeroen Bleekemolen	4	**1**	4	4	5	6			5	96
4	(Denmark) Nicki Thiim	14	8	8	**1**	Ret	2	6	**3**	7	94
5	(Germany) René Rast	2		Ret	Ret	1	3	14	2	2	93
6	(Netherlands) Jaap van Lagen	7	6	**1**	Ret	7	8	2	9	11	86
7	(Austria) Martin Ragginger		2	5	5	6	9	8		8	75
8	(Germany) Jan Seyffarth	6	9	9	8	Ret	4	21†	4	10	68
9	(Germany) Uwe Alzen	5	7	6	Ret	Ret		4		9	58
10	(Austria) Norbert Siedler			7	Ret	**2**	7	3		Ret	52
11	(France) Nicolas Armindo	17	14	17	Ret	4		5	6	4	52
12	(Poland) Robert Lukas	8	10	11	Ret		15	7	7	12	42
13	(Germany) Stefan Wendt	15	4	Ret	7	10	Ret	10	11	19	41
14	(Switzerland) Philipp Frommenwiler	9	12	Ret	9	8	11	17	12	16	37
15	(Germany) David Jahn			10	6			9		27†	23
16	(Germany) Kris Heidorn	13	15	13	Ret	12	12	11	15	18	23
17	(Austria) Johann Ledermair	10	11	12	13		14				21
18	(Austria) Clemens Schmid	16	13	14	Ret	9	13	16	16†	14	19
19	(Germany) Robert Renauer	**12**			12				8	Ret	17
20	(Germany) Christian Engelhart								13	6	13
21	(Germany) Florian Scholze			15	11		17	12	14	22	13
22	(France) Kévin Estre						10			13	6
23	(Germany) Hannes Plesse								10		6
24	(Poland) Damian Sawicki	11	Ret		10		16	13			5
25	(United States) Mark Bullitt					15					4
26	(Germany) Christopher Mies							15			2
guest drivers ineligible for championship points
	(New Zealand) Peter Scharmach					11					0
	(New Zealand) Craig Baird					13					0
	(Hong Kong) Darryl O'Young					14					0
	(Sweden) Johan Kristoffersson									15	0
	(Germany) Christoph Schrezenmeier			16							0
	(Germany) Hans-Guido Riegel					16					0
	(Australia) Greg Ross					17†					0
	(Czech Republic) Tomáš Pivoda									17	0
	(Germany) Jürgen Gerlach					18†					0
	(Germany) Klaus Abbelen							19			0
	(Germany) Christopher Gerhard							20			0
	(Switzerland) Raffi Bader									20	0
	(Germany) Bill Barazetti									21	0
	(Germany) Heinz-Bert Wolters									23	0
	(Sweden) Mats Karlsson									24	0
	(Germany) Andreas Iberg									25	0
	(Germany) Philipp Wlazik								Ret	26†	0
	(Germany) Jochen Krumbach					Ret					0
	(Canada) Perry Bortolotti					Ret					0
	(Germany) Jan-Erik Slooten					Ret					0
	(Austria) Philipp Eng									Ret	0
Pos	Driver	HOC (Germany)	ZAN (Netherlands)	RBR (Austria)	LAU (Germany)	NNS (Germany)	NOR (Germany)	NÜR (Germany)	OSC (Germany)	HOC (Germany)	Pts

Colour	Result
Gold	Winner
Silver	Second place
Bronze	Third place
Green	Points classification
Blue	Non-points classification
Blue	Non-classified finish (NC)
Purple	Retired, not classified (Ret)
Red	Did not qualify (DNQ)
Red	Did not pre-qualify (DNPQ)
Black	Disqualified (DSQ)
White	Did not start (DNS)
White	Withdrew (WD)
White	Race cancelled (C)
Blank	Did not practice (DNP)
Blank	Did not arrive (DNA)
Blank	Excluded (EX)

**Bold** – Pole
Italics – Fastest Lap

† — Drivers did not finish the race, but were classified as they completed over 90% of the race distance.
