= 2014 Porsche Carrera Cup Germany =

Motor racing competition

The 2014 Porsche Carrera Cup Deutschland season was the 29th German Porsche Carrera Cup season. It began on 3 May at Hockenheim and finished on 18 October at the same circuit, after nine race meetings, with two races at each event. It was a support championship for the 2014 Deutsche Tourenwagen Masters season.

Team Deutsche Post by Project 1 driver Philipp Eng was crowned champion at the final round of the season, with a third-place finish good enough to give him the drivers' championship by two points, ahead of QPOD Walter Lechner Racing's Michael Ammermüller. Eng started the season with a victory at Hockenheim, and won two more races during the campaign, including a race win at the August Red Bull Ring meeting that he had been previously disqualified from, before a successful appeal was heard in October. He ultimately recorded 17 points-scoring finishes from 18 attempts, including 9 podiums. Ammermüller was the season's most prolific driver, taking six pole positions and six victories during the year, and had the most podium finishes with ten. Third place in the championship went to Christian Engelhart of Konrad Motorsport, another three-time race winner during 2014.

Eng's teammate Sven Müller finished fourth in the overall championship, with five podium finishes, which saw him finish as the highest placed rookie driver during the season. Nicki Thiim, teammate to Ammermüller at QPOD Walter Lechner Racing, won both Sachsenring races to finish fifth in the championship. Other drivers to win races during the season were Team 75 Bernhard's Earl Bamber – who was leading the championship at mid-season with victories at Hockenheim and the Red Bull Ring – before electing to focus on his ultimately successful Porsche Supercup campaign, while Konrad Motorsport's Christopher Zöchling and FÖRCH Racing by Lukas Motorsport driver Connor De Phillippi won at Oschersleben and the Hungaroring respectively.

In the B-class championship for amateur drivers, the title was won by Rolf Ineichen, another Konrad Motorsport driver. Ineichen won 12 races, set 14 pole positions and recorded 15 fastest laps from the 18 races to be held during the season. He won the championship by 37 points ahead of Team GT3 Kasko driver Ralf Bohn, who won at Oschersleben. Third place in the championship went to Wolf Nathan of Land Motorsport, who won three races, including a weekend sweep at the Nürburgring. Bohn's teammate Daniel Allemann was the only other race winner in class, taking victories at the Norisring and Hockenheim. In the teams' championship, the performances of Ammermüller and Thiim – including a 1–2 finish in the season-ending race – allowed QPOD Walter Lechner Racing to take the title by a single point ahead of Team Deutsche Post by Project 1.

== Teams and drivers ==
Team	No.	Drivers	Class	Rounds
(Germany) McGregor by Attempto	1	(Netherlands) Pieter Schothorst	A	All
(Germany) McGregor by Attempto	2	(Switzerland) Fabien Thuner	A	All
(Germany) Land Motorsport	3	(Netherlands) Wolf Nathan	B	All
(Germany) Land Motorsport	4	(Netherlands) Jochen Habets	A	1–8
(Germany) Land Motorsport	65	(Netherlands) Ronald van de Laar	B	1–5
(Germany) Land Motorsport	65	(France) Côme Ledogar	A	6–9
(Germany) Aust Motorsport	5	(Germany) Patrick Eisemann	A	All
(Germany) Aust Motorsport	6	(Germany) Niclas Kentenich	A	1, 3–9
(Germany) Aust Motorsport	6	(Netherlands) Jaap van Lagen	A	2
(Germany) Konrad Motorsport	7	(Austria) Christopher Zöchling	A	All
(Germany) Konrad Motorsport	8	(Germany) Christian Engelhart	A	All
(Germany) Konrad Motorsport	29	(Switzerland) Rolf Ineichen	B	All
(Poland) FÖRCH Racing by Lukas Motorsport	9	(United States) Connor De Phillippi	A	All
(Poland) FÖRCH Racing by Lukas Motorsport	10	(Poland) Robert Lukas	A	All
(Poland) FÖRCH Racing by Lukas Motorsport	55	(Mexico) Christofer Berckhan	A	All
(Germany) Team Deutsche Post/PP by Project 1	11	(Sweden) Ola Nilsson	A	1–6, 8–9
(Germany) Team Deutsche Post/PP by Project 1	15	(United States) Sean Johnston	A	1–7, 9
(Germany) Team Deutsche Post by Project 1	12	(Austria) Philipp Eng	A	All
(Germany) Team Deutsche Post by Project 1	14	(Germany) Sven Müller	A	All
(Austria) ZaWotec Racing	16	(Austria) Marko Klein	A	1–3
(Austria) ZaWotec Racing	16	(Austria) Norbert Siedler	A	4–7, 9
(Austria) ZaWotec Racing	16	(Netherlands) Jaap van Lagen	A	8
(Austria) ZaWotec Racing	17	(Germany) Lukas Schreier	A	All
(Germany) TAM-Racing	18	(Germany) Christopher Gerhard	A	All
(Germany) TAM-Racing	19	(Germany) "Bill Barazetti"	B	All
(Germany) Team 75 Bernhard	20	(New Zealand) Earl Bamber	A	1–5
(Germany) Team 75 Bernhard	20	(France) Tom Dillmann	A	6, 8
(Germany) Team 75 Bernhard	20	(Austria) Klaus Bachler	A	7, 9
(Germany) Team 75 Bernhard	24	(Austria) Felix Wimmer	A	All
(Germany) Team GT3 Kasko	21	(Germany) Robert Renauer	A	All
(Germany) Team GT3 Kasko	22	(Switzerland) Daniel Allemann	B	All
(Germany) Team GT3 Kasko	23	(Germany) Ralf Bohn	B	All
(Austria) QPOD Walter Lechner Racing	25	(Germany) Michael Ammermüller	A	All
(Austria) QPOD Walter Lechner Racing	26	(Denmark) Nicki Thiim	A	1–3, 5–9
(Austria) QPOD Walter Lechner Racing	26	(Switzerland) Jeffrey Schmidt	A	4
(Austria) Lechner Racing Academy ME	27	(Switzerland) Jeffrey Schmidt	A	1–3, 5–9
(Austria) Lechner Racing Academy ME	28	(Austria) Clemens Schmid	A	All
(Germany) SMS Seyffarth Motorsport	30	(Germany) Mike Halder	A	All
(Germany) SMS Seyffarth Motorsport	31	(Germany) "Mike Keller"	B	All
(Germany) TECE MRS-Racing	33	(France) Jim Pla	A	1–5, 8
(Germany) TECE MRS-Racing	33	(Netherlands) Jaap van Lagen	A	6–7, 9
(Germany) TECE MRS-Racing	34	(Germany) Elia Erhart	A	All
(Germany) Attempto Racing by Häring	77	(Denmark) Michelle Gatting	A	1–6
(Germany) Attempto Racing by Häring	77	(Netherlands) Ronald van de Laar	B	7–9
(Germany) Attempto Racing by Häring	88	(Spain) Alex Riberas	A	All
(Germany) Attempto Racing by Häring	99	(Finland) Antti Buri	A	All

Icon	Class
A	A-class
B	B-class

== Race calendar and results ==
Round		Circuit	Date	Pole position	Fastest lap	Winning driver	Winning team	B-class winner
1	R1	(Germany) Hockenheimring	3 May	(Austria) Philipp Eng	(New Zealand) Earl Bamber	(Austria) Philipp Eng	(Germany) Team Deutsche Post by Project 1	(Switzerland) Rolf Ineichen
1	R2	(Germany) Hockenheimring	4 May	(United States) Connor De Phillippi	(New Zealand) Earl Bamber (Germany) Christian Engelhart	(New Zealand) Earl Bamber	(Germany) Team 75 Bernhard	(Switzerland) Rolf Ineichen
2	R3	(Germany) Oschersleben	17 May	(Netherlands) Pieter Schothorst	(Austria) Christopher Zöchling	(Austria) Christopher Zöchling	(Germany) Konrad Motorsport	(Germany) Ralf Bohn
2	R4	(Germany) Oschersleben	18 May	(Germany) Michael Ammermüller	(Netherlands) Jaap van Lagen	(Germany) Christian Engelhart	(Germany) Konrad Motorsport	(Switzerland) Rolf Ineichen
3	R5	(Hungary) Hungaroring	31 May	(Germany) Christian Engelhart	(Germany) Christian Engelhart	(Germany) Christian Engelhart	(Germany) Konrad Motorsport	(Switzerland) Rolf Ineichen
3	R6	(Hungary) Hungaroring	1 June	(United States) Connor De Phillippi	(Germany) Christian Engelhart	(United States) Connor De Phillippi	(Poland) FÖRCH Racing by Lukas Motorsport	(Switzerland) Rolf Ineichen
4	R7	(Germany) Norisring	28 June	(Germany) Michael Ammermüller	(Germany) Sven Müller	(Germany) Michael Ammermüller	(Austria) QPOD Walter Lechner Racing	(Switzerland) Rolf Ineichen
4	R8	(Germany) Norisring	29 June	(Germany) Sven Müller	(Germany) Robert Renauer	(Germany) Michael Ammermüller	(Austria) QPOD Walter Lechner Racing	(Switzerland) Daniel Allemann
5	R9	(Austria) Red Bull Ring	2 August	(Austria) Norbert Siedler	(Germany) Christian Engelhart	(Austria) Philipp Eng	(Germany) Team Deutsche Post by Project 1	(Switzerland) Rolf Ineichen
5	R10	(Austria) Red Bull Ring	3 August	(Spain) Alex Riberas	(New Zealand) Earl Bamber	(New Zealand) Earl Bamber	(Germany) Team 75 Bernhard	(Switzerland) Rolf Ineichen
6	R11	(Germany) Nürburgring	16 August	(Germany) Michael Ammermüller	(Netherlands) Jaap van Lagen	(Germany) Michael Ammermüller	(Austria) QPOD Walter Lechner Racing	(Netherlands) Wolf Nathan
6	R12	(Germany) Nürburgring	17 August	(Denmark) Nicki Thiim	(Germany) Sven Müller	(Austria) Philipp Eng	(Germany) Team Deutsche Post by Project 1	(Netherlands) Wolf Nathan
7	R13	(Germany) Lausitzring	13 September	(Germany) Michael Ammermüller	(Germany) Michael Ammermüller	(Germany) Michael Ammermüller	(Austria) QPOD Walter Lechner Racing	(Switzerland) Rolf Ineichen
7	R14	(Germany) Lausitzring	14 September	(Austria) Clemens Schmid	(Austria) Philipp Eng	(Germany) Michael Ammermüller	(Austria) QPOD Walter Lechner Racing	(Netherlands) Wolf Nathan
8	R15	(Germany) Sachsenring	20 September	(Germany) Michael Ammermüller	(Denmark) Nicki Thiim	(Denmark) Nicki Thiim	(Austria) QPOD Walter Lechner Racing	(Switzerland) Rolf Ineichen
8	R16	(Germany) Sachsenring	21 September	(Denmark) Nicki Thiim	(Denmark) Nicki Thiim	(Denmark) Nicki Thiim	(Austria) QPOD Walter Lechner Racing	(Switzerland) Rolf Ineichen
9	R17	(Germany) Hockenheimring	18 October	(Germany) Christian Engelhart	(Germany) Christian Engelhart	(Germany) Christian Engelhart	(Germany) Konrad Motorsport	(Switzerland) Rolf Ineichen
9	R18	(Germany) Hockenheimring	19 October	(Germany) Michael Ammermüller	(Denmark) Nicki Thiim	(Germany) Michael Ammermüller	(Austria) QPOD Walter Lechner Racing	(Switzerland) Daniel Allemann

== Championship standings ==
Points system
**1st**	**2nd**	**3rd**	**4th**	**5th**	**6th**	**7th**	**8th**	**9th**	**10th**	**11th**	**12th**	**13th**	**14th**	**15th**
20	18	16	14	12	10	9	8	7	6	5	4	3	2	1

=== A-class ===
Pos	Driver	HOC (Germany)		OSC (Germany)		HUN (Hungary)		NOR (Germany)		RBR (Austria)		NÜR (Note: Half points were awarded for the first race as less than 75% of the race distance had been completed.) (Germany)		LAU (Germany)		SAC (Germany)		HOC (Germany)		Pts
1	(Austria) Philipp Eng	**1**	3	10	14	Ret	3	4	4	1	3	5	1	2	3	6	4	7	3	233
2	(Germany) Michael Ammermüller	13	25	22	3	2	15	**1**	1	7	4	**1**	6	**1**	1	**2**	2	4	**1**	231
3	(Germany) Christian Engelhart	6	11	3	1	**1**	34	20	5	5	5	8	4	3	9	3	5	**1**	5	208
4	(Germany) Sven Müller	9	5	8	24	19	4	2	**3**	4	10	Ret	2	4	12	7	3	3	4	186
5	(Denmark) Nicki Thiim	2	18	4	Ret	4	2			2	8	Ret	**DNS**	13	5	1	**1**	2	2	181
6	(Austria) Christopher Zöchling	4	8	1	7	9	8	3	6	9	Ret	9	5	7	11	4	9	6	8	167.5
7	(New Zealand) Earl Bamber	3	1	Ret	5	5	17	5	2	3	1									126
8	(United States) Connor De Phillippi	5	**2**	7	4	3	**1**	Ret	16	12	9	10	18	9	10	18	31†	22	11	121
9	(Spain) Alex Riberas	7	7	2	6	8	7	16	7	10	**2**	Ret	DNS	8	13	15	10	18	21	114
10	(Germany) Robert Renauer	Ret	6	6	12	10	10	8	19	6	6	11	19	19	33†	5	7	13	9	97.5
11	(Austria) Clemens Schmid	10	19	13	19	12	6	11	15	8	Ret	18	7	5	**2**	8	11	20	12	93
12	(Switzerland) Jeffrey Schmidt	11	10	26	10	11	26	6	18	11	11	3	3	6	20	17	8	8	16	92
13	(Poland) Robert Lukas	12	4	5	8	6	Ret	24	9	15	13	Ret	DNS	Ret	8	9	6	28†	Ret	84
14	(Austria) Norbert Siedler							9	13	**27**	7	4	Ret	11	4			10	6	61
15	(Netherlands) Jaap van Lagen			9	2							2	8	20	14	10	33†	Ret	Ret	50
16	(Germany) Lukas Schreier	Ret	17	20	13	24	24	14	14	30	14	6	9	15	7	Ret	14	9	10	46
17	(United States) Sean Johnston	8	14	14	23	7	5	13	22	25	16	Ret	DNS	12	21			Ret	DNS	41
18	(Netherlands) Pieter Schothorst	Ret	16	**17**	9	Ret	12	15	11	16	28	15	24	10	6	20	15	11	Ret	40.5
19	(Sweden) Ola Nilsson	23	20	12	11	14	21	7	17	14	15	Ret	13			12	16	12	Ret	34
20	(Switzerland) Fabien Thuner	14	9	27	Ret	16	9	12	Ret	23	17	12	11	14	18	16	12	19	15	34
21	(France) Jim Pla	16	12	11	Ret	13	11	10	10	13	30†					22	19			32
22	(Austria) Klaus Bachler													22	Ret			5	7	21
23	(Germany) Mike Halder	24	23	Ret	Ret	25	20	21	8	29	21	14	10	33	15	14	18	16	Ret	19
24	(Germany) Niclas Kentenich	25	22			18	22	17	12	22	18	7	12	Ret	DNS	13	17	17	18	15.5
25	(France) Côme Ledogar											Ret	21	24	16	11	13	31†	13	11
26	(Mexico) Christofer Berckhan	20	21	33†	17	15	14	22	20	17	Ret	Ret	15	18	22	23	DNS	15	14	8
27	(Finland) Antti Buri	Ret	24	16	15	17	16	18	32	18	12	13	16	23	19	19	Ret	Ret	17	6.5
28	(Austria) Marko Klein	15	15	21	16	20	13													6
29	(Netherlands) Jochen Habets	17	30	29	18	35	25	31	27	28	23	Ret	14	29	24	24	26			2
30	(Denmark) Michelle Gatting	27	Ret	15	22	32	28	27	25	31	20	17	Ret							1
31	(Germany) Elia Erhart	Ret	31	19	26	22	18	25	26	24	19	16	23	25	28	31	28	23	19	0
32	(Austria) Felix Wimmer	Ret	27	28	28	26	27	28	28	32	Ret	20	17	21	17	34	22	21	22	0
33	(Germany) Christopher Gerhard	19	29	18	20	23	23	26	23	20	Ret	19	Ret	17	25	26	20	Ret	Ret	0
34	(France) Tom Dillmann											Ret	DNS			21	30†			0
35	(Germany) Patrick Eisemann	26	33	31	29	29	30	35	24	Ret	25	23	28	31	23	29	Ret	27	25	0
Pos	Driver	HOC (Germany)		OSC (Germany)		HUN (Hungary)		NOR (Germany)		RBR (Austria)		NÜR (Germany)		LAU (Germany)		SAC (Germany)		HOC (Germany)		Pts

Colour	Result
Gold	Winner
Silver	Second place
Bronze	Third place
Green	Points classification
Blue	Non-points classification
Blue	Non-classified finish (NC)
Purple	Retired, not classified (Ret)
Red	Did not qualify (DNQ)
Red	Did not pre-qualify (DNPQ)
Black	Disqualified (DSQ)
White	Did not start (DNS)
White	Withdrew (WD)
White	Race cancelled (C)
Blank	Did not practice (DNP)
Blank	Did not arrive (DNA)
Blank	Excluded (EX)

**Bold** – Pole
Italics – Fastest Lap

† — Drivers did not finish the race, but were classified as they completed over 90% of the race distance.

=== B-class ===
Pos	Driver	HOC (Germany)		OSC (Germany)		HUN (Hungary)		NOR (Germany)		RBR (Austria)		NÜR (Germany)		LAU (Germany)		SAC (Germany)		HOC (Germany)		Pts
1	(Switzerland) Rolf Ineichen	18	**13**	**32**	**21**	**21**	**19**	19	Ret	**19**	**22**	**Ret**	**25**	**16**	**29**	25	**21**	**14**	**DNS**	284
2	(Germany) Ralf Bohn	28	28	23	27	27	31	29	33	26	Ret	22	27	28	32	28	24	30†	24	247
3	(Netherlands) Wolf Nathan	29	32	24	25	31	35	32	29	Ret	27	21	20	27	26	32	25	29†	Ret	232
4	(Germany) "Bill Barazetti"	22	34	Ret	DNS	28	29	30	30	33	24	Ret	22	32	Ret	30	27	24	23	214
5	(Germany) "Mike Keller"	31	35	30	31	34	32	34	31	35	26	24	26	30	31	35	29	25	26	212
6	(Switzerland) Daniel Allemann	**21**	26	Ret	Ret	30	Ret	**23**	**21**	21	Ret	Ret	29†	26	27	**27**	23	Ret	20	208
7	(Netherlands) Ronald van de Laar	30	Ret	25	30	33	33	33	Ret	34	29			Ret	30	33	32	26	27	155
Pos	Driver	HOC (Germany)		OSC (Germany)		HUN (Hungary)		NOR (Germany)		RBR (Austria)		NÜR (Germany)		LAU (Germany)		SAC (Germany)		HOC (Germany)		Pts
