= 2012 Porsche Carrera Cup Germany =

Motor racing competition

Seasons
- ← 2011 2013 →

The 2012 Porsche Carrera Cup Deutschland season was the 27th German Porsche Carrera Cup season. It began on 28 April at Hockenheim and finished on 21 October at the same circuit, after seventeen races, with two races at each event bar Round 3. It ran as a support championship for the 2012 DTM season. René Rast won his second championship ahead of his teammate countryman Sean Edwards at an action packed final round. This was the first season in the championship with two races at each event supporting the DTM rounds. The B-class was introduced for the first time for amateur drivers.

== Teams and drivers ==
| Team | No. | Drivers | Class | Rounds |
|---|---|---|---|---|
| (Austria) Konrad Motorsport GmbH | 1 | (Austria) Norbert Siedler | A | All |
| (Austria) Konrad Motorsport GmbH | 2 | (Czech Republic) Tomáš Pivoda | A | All |
| (Austria) Konrad Motorsport GmbH | 7 | (Denmark) Michael Christensen | A | All |
| (Germany) Land-Motorsport | 3 | (Netherlands) Harrie Kolen | B | All |
| (Germany) Land-Motorsport | 4 | (Netherlands) Hoevert Vos | B | 2-9 |
| (Germany) FE Racing by Land - Motorsport | 5 | (Netherlands) Jaap van Lagen | A | All |
| (Germany) FE Racing by Land - Motorsport | 6 | (Netherlands) Wolf Nathan | B | All |
| (Germany) Farnbacher ESET Racing | 10 | (Germany) Felipe Fernández Laser | A | 1-2, 4-5 |
| (Germany) Farnbacher ESET Racing | 10 | (Germany) Niclas Kentenich | A | 3 |
| (Germany) Farnbacher ESET Racing | 91 | (Denmark) Christina Nielsen | B | All |
| (Germany) Marschall Goebel Racing | 11 | (Germany) Elia Erhart | A | All |
| (Germany) Marschall Goebel Racing | 12 | (New Zealand) Peter Scharmach | B | 6 |
| (Germany) Marschall Goebel Racing | 91 | (Austria) Matthias Gamauf | A | 1-2, 4-5 |
| (Germany) Team Deutsche Post by tolimit | 14 | (Germany) René Rast | A | All |
| (Germany) Team Deutsche Post by tolimit | 15 | (Austria) Klaus Bachler | A | All |
| (Germany) Team Deutsche Post by tolimit | 16 | (United Kingdom) Sean Edwards | A | All |
| (Austria) Switch It Lechner Racing | 19 | (Austria) Clemens Schmid | A | All |
| (Austria) Switch It Lechner Racing | 37 | (Germany) Michael Ammermüller | A | 1-4, 9 |
| (Germany) MRS GT-Racing | 33 | (Germany) Bill Barazetti | B | All |
| (Germany) MRS GT-Racing | 34 | (Austria) Philipp Eng | A | All |
| (Germany) MRS GT-Racing | 46 | (Greece) Antonis Wossos | B | 7 |
| (Germany) MRS GT-Racing | 52 | (Germany) Florian Spengler | A | 9 |
| (Netherlands) Team Bleekemolen | 41 | (Netherlands) Jeroen Mul | A | 1, 7 |
| (Netherlands) Team Bleekemolen | 52 | (Netherlands) Sebastiaan Bleekemolen | A | 7 |
| (France) BG Racing | 42 | (France) Pascal Bour | B | 3 |
| (Austria) GT3 Cup Middle East | 43 | (New Zealand) Peter Scharmach | B | 3 |
| (Austria) GT3 Cup Middle East | 51 | (Germany) Hannes Waimer | B | 3, 5-7 |
| (Austria) Lechner Racing Team | 44 | (Austria) Andreas Mayerl | B | 4 |
| Konrad Motorsport Austria | 45 | (Canada) Mark J. Thomas | B | 6-7 |
| (Poland) Förch Racing | 47 | (Poland) Robert Lukas | A | 8-9 |
| (Poland) Förch Racing | 49 | (Germany) Florian Scholze | A | 8-9 |
| (Turkey) Hermes Attempto Racing | 66 | (France) Nicolas Armindo | A | 1, 6 |
| (Turkey) Hermes Attempto Racing | 66 | (Germany) David Jahn | A | 2-5 |
| (Turkey) Hermes Attempto Racing | 66 | (Netherlands) Jeroen Bleekemolen | A | 7 |
| (Turkey) Hermes Attempto Racing | 66 | (Turkey) Arkin Aka | A | 8 |
| (Turkey) Hermes Attempto Racing | 66 | (Germany) Robert Renauer | A | 9 |
| (Turkey) Hermes Attempto Racing | 77 | (Switzerland) Philipp Frommenwiler | A | All |
| (Turkey) Hermes Attempto Racing | 88 | (Denmark) Nicki Thiim | A | All |
| (Turkey) Hermes Attempto Racing | 99 | (France) Kévin Estre | A | All |

| Icon | Class |
|---|---|
| A | A-class |
| B | B-class |

== Race calendar and results ==
| Round | | Circuit | Date | Pole position | Fastest lap | Winning driver | Winning team | B-class winner |
|---|---|---|---|---|---|---|---|---|
| 1 | R1 | (Germany) Hockenheimring | 28 April | (United Kingdom) Sean Edwards | (Germany) René Rast | (Germany) René Rast | (Germany) Team Deutsche Post by tolimit | (Netherlands) Harrie Kolen |
| 1 | R2 | (Germany) Hockenheimring | 29 April | (United Kingdom) Sean Edwards | (France) Kévin Estre | (United Kingdom) Sean Edwards | (Germany) Team Deutsche Post by tolimit | (Netherlands) Harrie Kolen |
| 2 | R3 | (Germany) Lausitzring | 5 May | (France) Kévin Estre | (United Kingdom) Sean Edwards | (Denmark) Nicki Thiim | (Turkey) Hermes Attempto Racing | (Netherlands) Hoevert Vos |
| 2 | R4 | (Germany) Lausitzring | 6 May | (United Kingdom) Sean Edwards | (United Kingdom) Sean Edwards | (United Kingdom) Sean Edwards | (Germany) Team Deutsche Post by tolimit | (Netherlands) Hoevert Vos |
| 3 | R5 | (Germany) Nürburgring Nordschleife | 19 May | (Austria) Philipp Eng | (Germany) René Rast | (France) Kévin Estre | (Turkey) Hermes Attempto Racing | (New Zealand) Peter Scharmach |
| 4 | R6 | (Austria) Red Bull Ring | 2 June | (United Kingdom) Sean Edwards | (United Kingdom) Sean Edwards | (Austria) Norbert Siedler | (Austria) Konrad Motorsport GmbH | (Austria) Andreas Mayerl |
| 4 | R7 | (Austria) Red Bull Ring | 3 June | (United Kingdom) Sean Edwards | (United Kingdom) Sean Edwards | (United Kingdom) Sean Edwards | (Germany) Team Deutsche Post by tolimit | (Austria) Andreas Mayerl |
| 5 | R8 | (Germany) Norisring | 30 June | (Germany) René Rast | (Germany) René Rast | (Germany) René Rast | (Germany) Team Deutsche Post with tolimit | (Netherlands) Harrie Kolen |
| 5 | R9 | (Germany) Norisring | 1 July | (Germany) René Rast | (Germany) René Rast | (Germany) René Rast | (Germany) Team Deutsche Post with tolimit | (Netherlands) Hoevert Vos |
| 6 | R10 | (Germany) Nürburgring Short | 18 August | (Germany) René Rast | (Germany) René Rast | (Germany) René Rast | (Germany) Team Deutsche Post with tolimit | (Netherlands) Hoevert Vos |
| 6 | R11 | (Germany) Nürburgring Short | 19 August | (Denmark) Nicki Thiim | (United Kingdom) Sean Edwards | (Denmark) Nicki Thiim | (Turkey) Hermes Attempto Racing | (Denmark) Christina Nielsen |
| 7 | R12^{1} | (Netherlands) Zandvoort | 25 August | (Germany) René Rast | (Germany) René Rast | (United Kingdom) Sean Edwards | (Germany) Team Deutsche Post by tolimit | (Netherlands) Hoevert Vos |
| 7 | R13 | (Netherlands) Zandvoort | 26 August | (Denmark) Nicki Thiim | (Austria) Norbert Siedler | (Germany) René Rast | (Germany) Team Deutsche Post by tolimit | (Netherlands) Hoevert Vos |
| 8 | R14 | (Germany) Oschersleben | 15 September | (Germany) René Rast | (Germany) René Rast | (Germany) René Rast | (Germany) Team Deutsche Post by tolimit | (Germany) Bill Barazetti |
| 8 | R15 | (Germany) Oschersleben | 16 September | (United Kingdom) Sean Edwards | (United Kingdom) Sean Edwards | (United Kingdom) Sean Edwards | (Germany) Team Deutsche Post by tolimit | (Netherlands) Hoevert Vos |
| 9 | R16 | (Germany) Hockenheimring | 20 October | (United Kingdom) Sean Edwards | (Germany) René Rast^{2} | (Denmark) Nicki Thiim | (Turkey) Hermes Attempto Racing | (Netherlands) Hoevert Vos |
| 9 | R17 | (Germany) Hockenheimring | 21 October | (Denmark) Michael Christensen | (Denmark) Michael Christensen | (Denmark) Michael Christensen | (Austria) Konrad Motorsport GmbH | (Denmark) Christina Nielsen |

1# – Race stopped due to torrential rain resulting in only half points being awarded.

2# – Sean Edwards recorded the fastest lap but was not counted due to being disqualified from the race.

== Championship standings ==
Points system
| **1st** | **2nd** | **3rd** | **4th** | **5th** | **6th** | **7th** | **8th** | **9th** | **10th** | **11th** | **12th** | **13th** | **14th** | **15th** |
| 20 | 18 | 16 | 14 | 12 | 10 | 9 | 8 | 7 | 6 | 5 | 4 | 3 | 2 | 1 |

=== A-class ===
| Pos | Driver | HOC (Germany) | | LAU (Germany) | | NNS (Germany) | RBR (Austria) | | NOR (Germany) | | NÜR (Germany) | | ZAN (Netherlands) | | OSC (Germany) | | HOC (Germany) | | Pts |
|---|---|---|---|---|---|---|---|---|---|---|---|---|---|---|---|---|---|---|---|
| 1 | (Germany) René Rast | 1 | 3 | 2 | 9 | 3 | 14 | 3 | **1** | **1** | **1** | 3 | **16** | 1 | **1** | 2 | 7 | Ret | 242 |
| 2 | (United Kingdom) Sean Edwards | **Ret** | **1** | 3 | **1** | 2 | **11** | **1** | 3 | 6 | 4 | 2 | 1 | 3 | 2 | **1** | **DSQ** | 5 | 233 |
| 3 | (Denmark) Nicki Thiim | 7 | 4 | 1 | 17† | 8 | 4 | 4 | Ret | Ret | 2 | **1** | 2 | **5** | 3 | 3 | 1 | 6 | 202 |
| 4 | (France) Kévin Estre | Ret | 2 | **4** | 2 | 1 | 2 | 2 | Ret | 2 | DSQ | DSQ | 4 | Ret | 4 | Ret | 2 | 2 | 181 |
| 5 | (Austria) Norbert Siedler | 6 | 6 | 7 | Ret | 4 | 1 | 5 | 2 | 3 | 8 | 8 | Ret | 4 | 15 | 10 | 5 | 3 | 178 |
| 6 | (Netherlands) Jaap van Lagen | 4 | 5 | 5 | 4 | 5 | 13 | 9 | Ret | 4 | 3 | Ret | 3 | 6 | 7 | 5 | 6 | 15 | 158 |
| 7 | (Denmark) Michael Christensen | 9 | 12 | 6 | 3 | 9 | 6 | 8 | 6 | 10 | 5 | 16 | 20† | 7 | 6 | 15 | 21† | **1** | 148 |
| 8 | (Austria) Klaus Bachler | 17 | 13 | 18 | Ret | 14 | 3 | 7 | Ret | 8 | 9 | 7 | 8 | 11 | 8 | 4 | 4 | 4 | 122 |
| 9 | (Switzerland) Philipp Frommenwiler | Ret | 11 | 11 | 8 | 10 | 7 | 13 | 4 | 5 | 7 | 6 | Ret | 13 | 10 | 18† | 11 | 8 | 113 |
| 10 | (Austria) Philipp Eng | 5 | 8 | 12 | 6 | **6** | Ret | DNS | Ret | Ret | 10 | 5 | 9 | 14 | 9 | 6 | 3 | 9 | 112.5 |
| 11 | (Germany) Michael Ammermüller | 3 | 9 | 8 | 5 | 7 | 5 | 11 | | | | | | | | | 9 | 12 | 82 |
| 12 | (Czech Republic) Tomáš Pivoda | 10 | Ret | 15 | 13 | 11 | 10 | 14 | 8 | 14 | 13 | 17† | 12 | 16 | 11 | 8 | 15 | 14 | 74.5 |
| 13 | (Austria) Clemens Schmid | Ret | Ret | 9 | 20 | 22† | 19† | 10 | 5 | 11 | 19† | 12 | 5 | 10 | 18 | Ret | 16 | 11 | 68 |
| 14 | (Germany) Elia Erhart | 8 | 14 | 13 | 10 | 16 | Ret | 16 | 7 | Ret | 11 | Ret | 11 | Ret | 12 | 11 | 12 | 16 | 60 |
| 15 | (France) Nicolas Armindo | 2 | 7 | | | | | | | | 6 | 4 | | | | | | | 51 |
| 16 | (Germany) David Jahn | | | 10 | 7 | 21† | Ret | 6 | Ret | 7 | | | | | | | | | 35 |
| 17 | (Germany) Felipe Fernández Laser | 11 | 15 | 14 | 11 | | 8 | 12 | Ret | 9 | | | | | | | | | 33 |
| 18 | (Netherlands) Jeroen Bleekemolen | | | | | | | | | | | | 17 | 2 | | | | | 20.5 |
| 19 | (Austria) Matthias Gamauf | 12 | 17 | 19 | 15 | | 9 | 18 | Ret | 12 | | | | | | | | | 19 |
| 20 | (Germany) Robert Renauer | | | | | | | | | | | | | | | | 10 | 7 | 16 |
| 21 | (Turkey) Arkin Aka | | | | | | | | | | | | | | 14 | 16 | | | 9 |
| 22 | (Germany) Niclas Kentenich | | | | | 12 | | | | | | | | | | | | | 4 |
guest drivers ineligible for championship points
| | (Poland) Robert Lukas | | | | | | | | | | | | | | 5 | 9 | 8 | 10 | 0 |
| | (Netherlands) Jeroen Mul | 18† | 10 | | | | | | | | | | 6 | 8 | | | | | 0 |
| | (Netherlands) Sebastiaan Bleekemolen | | | | | | | | | | | | 7 | 9 | | | | | 0 |
| | (Germany) Florian Scholze | | | | | | | | | | | | | | 13 | 7 | 13 | 18 | 0 |
| | (Germany) Florian Spengler | | | | | | | | | | | | | | | | 14 | 13 | 0 |
| Pos | Driver | HOC (Germany) | | LAU (Germany) | | NNS (Germany) | RBR (Austria) | | NOR (Germany) | | NÜR (Germany) | | ZAN (Netherlands) | | OSC (Germany) | | HOC (Germany) | | Pts |

| Colour | Result |
|---|---|
| Gold | Winner |
| Silver | Second place |
| Bronze | Third place |
| Green | Points classification |
| Blue | Non-points classification |
| Blue | Non-classified finish (NC) |
| Purple | Retired, not classified (Ret) |
| Red | Did not qualify (DNQ) |
| Red | Did not pre-qualify (DNPQ) |
| Black | Disqualified (DSQ) |
| White | Did not start (DNS) |
| White | Withdrew (WD) |
| White | Race cancelled (C) |
| Blank | Did not practice (DNP) |
| Blank | Did not arrive (DNA) |
| Blank | Excluded (EX) |

**Bold** – Pole
Italics – Fastest Lap

† — Drivers did not finish the race, but were classified as they completed over 90% of the race distance.

=== B-class ===
| Pos | Driver | HOC (Germany) | | LAU (Germany) | | NNS (Germany) | RBR (Austria) | | NOR (Germany) | | NÜR (Germany) | | ZAN (Netherlands) | | OSC (Germany) | | HOC (Germany) | | Pts |
|---|---|---|---|---|---|---|---|---|---|---|---|---|---|---|---|---|---|---|---|
| 1 | (Germany) Bill Barazetti | 14 | 18 | 22 | 18 | 19 | 15 | 17 | 11 | 18 | 16 | 10 | 14 | 17 | 16 | Ret | 18 | 20 | 256 |
| 2 | (Netherlands) Harrie Kolen | 13 | **16** | 20 | 16 | Ret | 18 | 19 | 9 | 15 | 20† | DNS | Ret | 18 | 17 | 14 | 19 | 19 | 233 |
| 3 | (Netherlands) Wolf Nathan | 16 | 20 | 21 | 19 | 18 | 16 | 20 | 10 | 16 | 18 | 11 | 13 | 21 | Ret | 13 | 20 | Ret | 217 |
| 4 | (Netherlands) Hoevert Vos | | | 16 | 12 | 15 | Ret | Ret | **12** | **13** | 12 | Ret | 10 | **12** | **Ret** | **12** | **17** | **Ret** | 198 |
| 5 | (Denmark) Christina Nielsen | **15** | 19 | **17** | **14** | Ret | 17 | Ret | Ret | 19 | **17** | **9** | **15** | 15 | Ret | 17 | 22† | 17 | 197 |
| 6 | (Germany) Hannes Waimer | | | | | 20 | | | 13 | 17 | 15 | 15 | 19 | 19 | | | | | 86 |
| 7 | (New Zealand) Peter Scharmach | | | | | **13** | | | | | 14 | 13 | | | | | | | 32 |
guest drivers ineligible for championship points
| | (Austria) Andreas Mayerl | | | | | | **12** | **15** | | | | | | | | | | | 0 |
| | (Canada) Mark J. Thomas | | | | | | | | | | Ret | 14 | 18 | 20 | | | | | 0 |
| | (France) Pascal Bour | | | | | 17 | | | | | | | | | | | | | 0 |
| | (Greece) Antonis Wossos | | | | | | | | | | | | 21† | DNS | | | | | 0 |
| Pos | Driver | HOC (Germany) | | LAU (Germany) | | NNS (Germany) | RBR (Austria) | | NOR (Germany) | | NÜR (Germany) | | ZAN (Netherlands) | | OSC (Germany) | | HOC (Germany) | | Pts |
