= Robert Lukas (racing driver) =

Polish racing driver (born 1988)

- Nationality: (Poland) Polish
- Born: 5 January 1988 (age 38)

Porsche Supercup career
- Debut season: 2010
- Current team: FÖRCH Racing by Lukas Motorsport
- Car number: 5

Robert Lukas (born 5 January 1988) is a Polish racing driver. He currently races in the Porsche Supercup series.

== Racing record ==
=== Career summary ===
Season	Series	Team	Races	Wins	Poles	F/Laps	Podiums	Points	Position
2006	Porsche Carrera Cup Germany	Fuchs-Star-Moto Racing	1	0	0	0	0	0	NC
2007	Porsche Carrera Cup Germany	Fuchs-Star-Moto Racing	9	0	0	0	0	0	NC
2008	Porsche Carrera Cup Germany	SMS Seyffarth-Motorsport	9	0	0	0	0	8	25th
2009	Porsche Carrera Cup Germany	Schnabl Engineering	5	0	0	0	0	27	17th
2010	Porsche Carrera Cup Germany	Förch Racing	9	0	0	0	1	55	10th
2010	Porsche Supercup	VERVA Racing Team	10	0	0	0	0	27	17th
2010	ADAC GT Masters	Attempto Racing	2	0	0	0	0	0	NC
2011	Porsche Carrera Cup Germany	Förch Racing	8	0	0	0	0	42	12th
2011	Porsche Supercup	Attempto Racing	8	0	0	0	0	34	13th
2011	ADAC GT Masters	Attempto Racing	1	0	0	0	0	0	NC
2012	Porsche Carrera Cup Germany	Förch Racing	4	0	0	0	0	0	NC
2012	Porsche Supercup	Förch Racing	10	0	0	0	1	74	9th
2013	Porsche Carrera Cup Germany	Förch Racing by Lukas Motorsport	17	0	0	0	3	134	8th
2013	Porsche Supercup	Förch Racing by Lukas Motorsport	9	0	0	0	0	44	11th
2014	Porsche Carrera Cup Germany	Förch Racing by Lukas Motorsport	18	0	0	0	0	84	13th
2014	Porsche Supercup	Förch Racing by Lukas Motorsport	9	0	0	0	0	42	13th
2015	Porsche Supercup	Förch Racing by Lukas Motorsport	10	0	0	0	0	51	13th
2015	24H Series - 997	Förch Racing by Lukas Motorsport							
2015	24H Series - 997	GT3 Poland							
2016	Porsche Carrera Cup Germany	Förch Racing by Lukas Motorsport	2	0	0	0	0	0	NC
2016	Porsche Supercup	Förch Racing by Lukas Motorsport	10	0	1	1	2	118	5th
2016	24H Series - 991	Platinum Racing							
2016	24H Series - 991	Förch Racing by Lukas Motorsport							
2016	24H Series - 991	GT3 Poland							
2017	Porsche Supercup	OLIMP Racing by Lukas Motorsport	11	0	0	0	0	103	5th
2017	24H Series - A6	Förch Racing powered by Olimp	4	0	0	1	0	28	28th
2017	24H Series - 991	Förch Racing powered by Olimp							
2018	24H GT Series - A6	Förch Racing							
2018	24H GT Series - 911	Förch Racing							

* Season still in progress.

=== Complete Porsche Supercup results ===
(key) (Races in bold indicate pole position) (Races in italics indicate fastest lap)

Year	Team	1	2	3	4	5	6	7	8	9	10	11	Pos.	Pts
2010	VERVA Racing Team	BHR; 10	BHR; 20	CAT; 10	MON; 17	VAL; 15	SIL; 11	HOC; DSQ	HUN; 11	SPA; 15	MNZ; Ret		17th	27
2011	Attempto Racing	IST; 12	CAT; 11	MON; 9	NÜR	SIL; 19	NÜR; 14	HUN; 6	SPA; 12	MNZ; Ret	YMC	YMC	13th	34
2012	FÖRCH Racing	BHR; 13	BHR; 13	MON; 9	VAL; 3	SIL; 11	HOC; 4	HUN; 8	HUN; 7	SPA; 12	MNZ; Ret		9th	74
2013	FÖRCH Racing by Lukas Motorsport	CAT; 6	MON; 15	SIL; Ret	NÜR; 7	HUN; 19	SPA; 4	MNZ; Ret	YMC; 14	YMC; 11			11th	74
2014	FÖRCH Racing by Lukas Motorsport	CAT; Ret	MON; 7	RBR; 11	SIL; 8	HOC; 9	HUN; 11	SPA	MNZ; 16	COA; 13	COA; 12		13th	42
2015	FÖRCH Racing by Lukas Motorsport	CAT; 7	MON; Ret	RBR; 6	SIL; Ret	HUN; 8	SPA; 14	SPA; Ret	MNZ; 5	MNZ; 35†	COA; C	COA; 9	13th	51
2016	FÖRCH Racing by Lukas Motorsport	CAT; 7	MON; 8	RBR; Ret	SIL; 6	**HUN**; 2	HOC; 4	SPA; 6	MNZ; 5	COA; 3	COA; 4		5th	118
2017	OLIMP Racing by Lukas Motorsport	CAT; 4	CAT; 9	MON; 7	RBR; 7	SIL; 6	HUN; 4	SPA; 5	SPA; 6	MNZ; 7	MEX; Ret	MEX; 8	5th	103

^{†} Driver did not finish the race, but was classified as he completed over 90% of the race distance.
