= Niclas Kentenich =

German businessman and racing driver (born 1988)

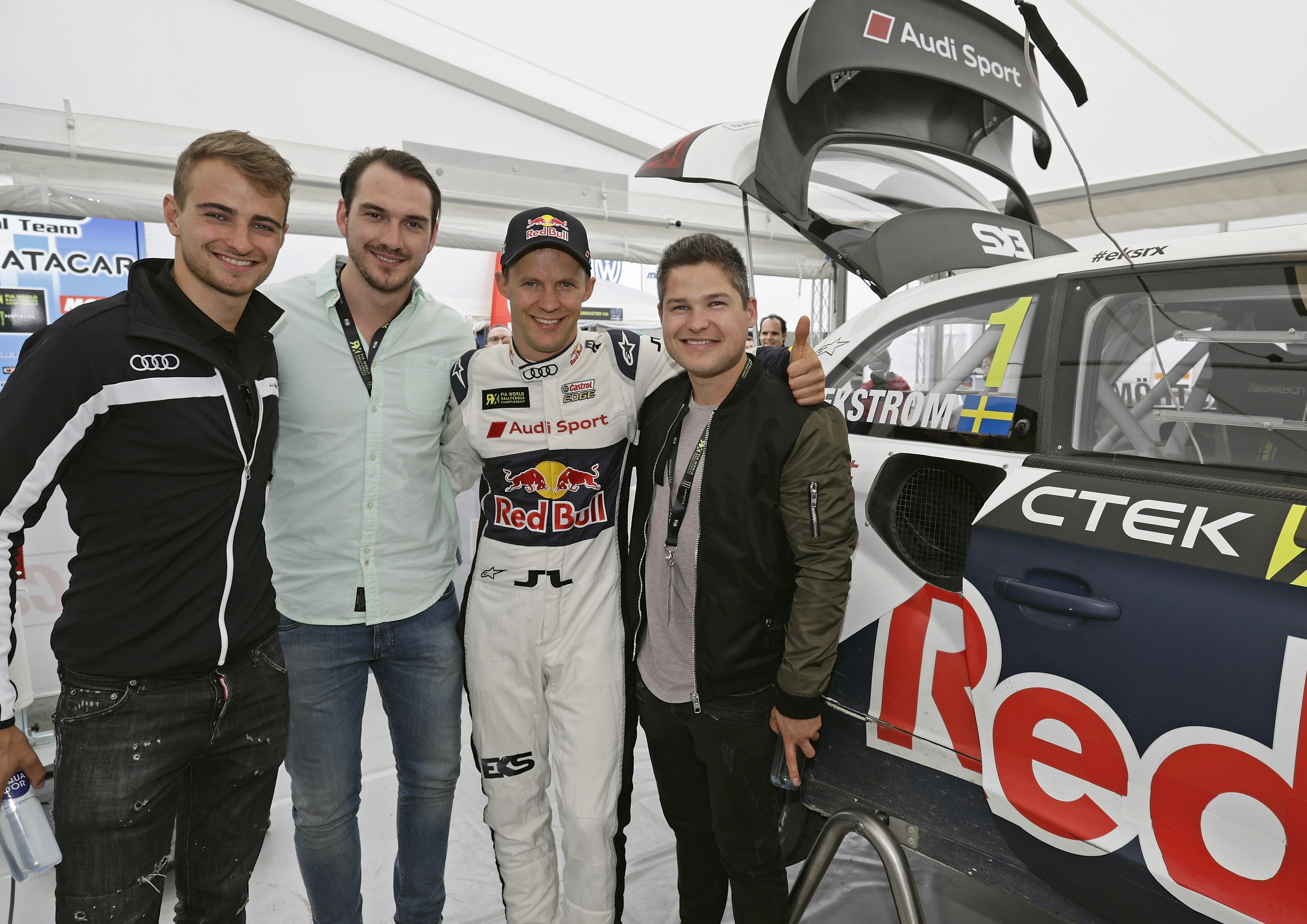
- Kentenich (second from the left) in 2017
- Nationality: (Germany) German
- Born: 16 July 1988 (age 38) Neuss, Germany
- Categorisation: FIA Silver

Niclas Kentenich (born 16 July 1988) is a German businessman and former racing driver. He won the Dubai 24 Hour overall in 2009, as well as multiple ADAC GT Masters races from 2010 to 2012, having risen up through the PCCD ranks. He retired in 2015 after suffering serious injuries in a VLN crash.

== Career ==
Kentenich began his career in 2004, competing in the ADAC Volkswagen Polo Cup. Racing in the series until 2006, Kentenich most notably finished third in the 2006 standings with four podiums to his name. In 2007, Kentenich joined Ahlden Motorsport to compete in Porsche Carrera Cup Germany, and returned the following year with Farnbacher RT, taking a best result of tenth at the Norisring to end the year 16th overall.

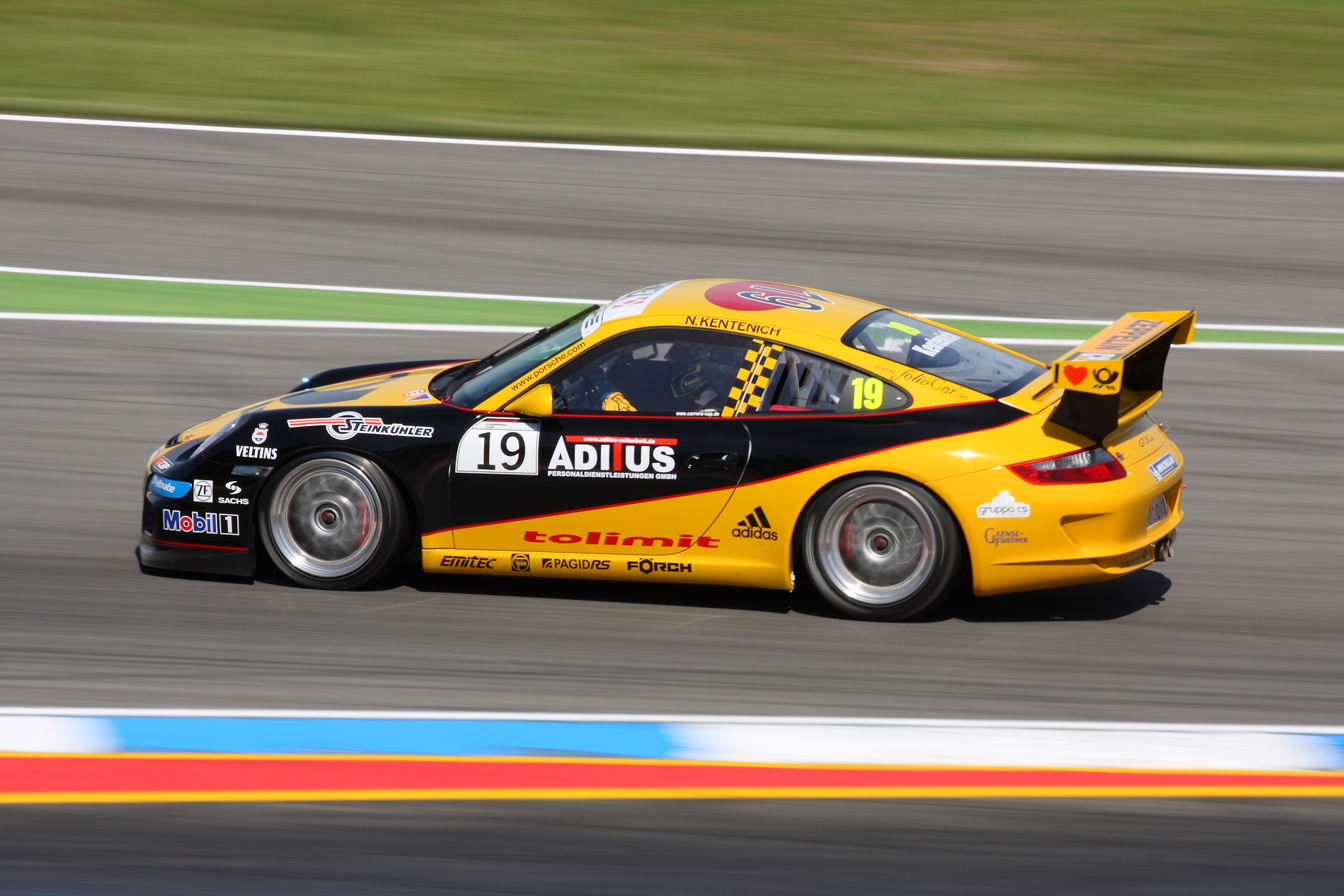
Kentenich competing in Porsche Carrera Cup Germany at Hockenheim in 2009.

In 2009, Kentenich switched to tolimit/Seyffarth Motorsport for his third season in Porsche Carrera Cup Germany, scoring a best result of seventh at Zandvoort to end the season 15th in the overall standings. During 2009, Kentenich also won the Dubai 24 Hour for Land Motorsport, and made his debut in the VLN Series for Mühlner Motorsport. Moving to GT3 competition on a full-time basis in 2010, Kentenich joined Porsche-fielding a-workx/Wieth Racing to graduate to ADAC GT Masters. After winning on debut at Oschersleben alongside Sebastian Asch, Kentenich took three other podiums en route to a seventh-place points finish. During 2010, Kentenich also scored his first PCCD podium for Farnbacher Racing, as well as racing in VLN on a part-time basis for Frikadelli Racing.

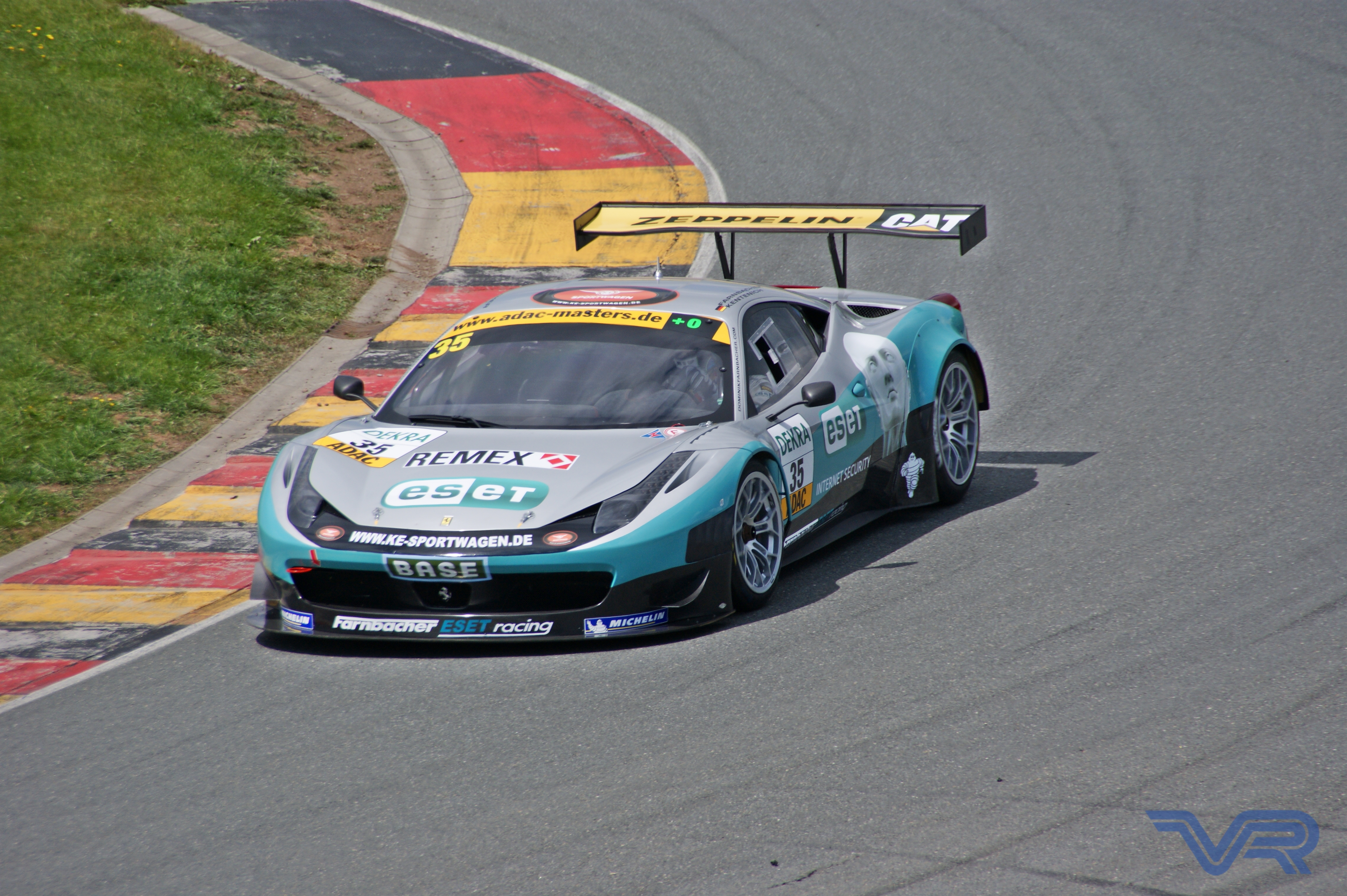
Kentenich's Farnbacher ESET Ferrari at the Sachsenring in 2011.

The following year, Kentenich moved to Farnbacher ESET Racing to continue in ADAC GT Masters, driving a Ferrari 458 Italia GT3 alongside a revolving door of drivers. In his second season in the series, Kentenich took a lone win at Assen alongside Dominik Farnbacher and two other podiums to take tenth in points. During 2011, Kentenich also took his maiden VLN podium for MSC Adenau e. V. im ADAC, as well as making his 24 Hours of Nürburgring debut, finishing ninth overall. In 2012, Kentenich partnered Mario Farnbacher, younger brother of Dominik, in ADAC GT Masters, only finding success after a mid-season switch to the Porsche 911 GT3 R, taking a win at the Red Bull Ring en route to 14th in points. During 2012, Kentenich took his first VLN class win at the 6h ADAC Ruhr-Pokal-Rennen, in Cup 2 for PZ Aschaffenburg.

At the beginning of 2013, Kentenich raced the season-opening Nogaro round of the FIA GT Series, sharing a Dörr Motorsport McLaren MP4-12C GT3 with Daniel Keilwitz. For the rest of 2013, Kentenich took two overall VLN podiums with H&R Spezialfedern, as well as racing in ADAC GT Masters with Corvette-aligned Callaway Competition and BMW-fielding Vita4One Racing Team but failing to score points. Returning to Porsche Carrera Cup Germany with Aust Motorsport in 2014, Kentenich took a best result of seventh at the Nürburgring, as he ended the season 24th overall. Kentenich then began 2015 competing for MSC Adenau e.V. im ADAC in VLN, but a crash during qualifying for VLN1 left him with serious injuries and on the sidelines for much of the year. Later in the year, Kentenich competed with Aust for select rounds of Porsche Carrera Cup Germany, but after taking a best result of 11th at Oschersleben, he retired from motorsport at the age of 27 due to long-term consequences of his VLN1 crash.

== Personal life ==
Kentenich is the younger brother of Patrick Kentenich, who raced alongside him in the ADAC Volkswagen Polo Cup.

Following his retirement from motorsport, Kentenich began working full-time at his family-run landscaping business, KE Kentenich GmbH, as its managing director.

== Racing record ==
=== Racing career summary ===
Season	Series	Team	Races	Wins	Poles	F/Laps	Podiums	Points	Position
2004	ADAC Volkswagen Polo Cup		10	0	0	0	0	116	17th
2005	ADAC Volkswagen Polo Cup		10	0	0	1	0	180	11th
2006	ADAC Volkswagen Polo Cup		10	0	2	2	4	326	**3rd**
2007	Porsche Carrera Cup Germany	Ahlden Motorsport	7	0	0	0	0	1	26th
2007	Porsche Carrera Cup Germany	Farnbacher Racing	1	0	0	0	0	1	26th
2008	Porsche Carrera Cup Germany	Farnbacher RT	9	0	0	0	0	17	16th
2009	Dubai 24 Hour – A6	Land Motorsport	1	1	0	0	1	—N/a	**1st**
2009	Porsche Carrera Cup Germany	tolimit/Seyffarth Motorsport	9	0	0	0	0	30	15th
2009	VLN Series – SP9	Mühlner Motorsport	1	0	0	0	0		
2010	VLN Series – SP9	Frikadelli Racing	2	0	0	0	0		
2010	Porsche Carrera Cup Germany	Farnbacher Racing	5	0	0	0	1	43	13th
2010	ADAC GT Masters	a-workx/Wieth Racing	13	1	0	0	4	44	7th
2011	ADAC GT Masters	Farnbacher ESET Racing	16	1	1	0	3	87	10th
2011	VLN Series – SP9	MSC Adenau e. V. im ADAC	2	0	0	0	1		
2011	24 Hours of Nürburgring – SP9 GT3	MSC Adenau e. V. im ADAC	1	0	0	0	0	—N/a	6th
2012	ADAC GT Masters	Farnbacher ESET Racing	14	1	1	0	2	54	14th
2012	Porsche Carrera Cup Germany – A	Farnbacher ESET Racing	1	0	0	0	0	4	22nd
2012	VLN Series – Cup 2	PZ Aschaffenburg		1					
2012	24 Hours of Nürburgring – SP7	Dörr Motorsport	1	0	0	0	0	—N/a	5th
2013	FIA GT Series – Pro	Dörr Motorsport	2	0	0	0	0	1	21st
2013	ADAC GT Masters	Callaway Competition	4	0	0	0	0	0	NC
2013	ADAC GT Masters	Vita4One Racing Team	6	0	0	0	0	0	NC
2013	VLN Series – SP9	H&R Spezialfedern	6	0	0	0	2	0	NC
2014	Porsche Carrera Cup Germany – A	Aust Motorsport	15	0	0	0	0	15.5	24th
2014	VLN Series – SP9	Walkenhorst Motorsport	5	0	0	0	1	13.33	37th
2014	24 Hours of Nürburgring – SP9 GT3	Prosperia C. Abt Racing GmbH	1	0	0	0	0	—N/a	14th
2015	VLN Series – Cup 2	MSC Adenau e.V. im ADAC	0	0	0	0	0	0	NC
2015	Porsche Carrera Cup Germany – A	Aust Motorsport	8	0	0	0	0	21	19th

=== Complete Porsche Carrera Cup Germany results ===
(key) (Races in bold indicate pole position) (Races in italics indicate fastest lap)

Year	Team	1	2	3	4	5	6	7	8	9	10	11	12	13	14	15	16	17	18	DC	Points
2007	Ahlden Motorsport	HOC1; 25	OSC; 18	LAU; 1 Ret	LAU; 2 Ret	NOR; Ret	ZAN; 17	NÜR; 17	BAR											26th	1
2007	Farnbacher Racing									HOC2; 17										26th	1
2008	Farnbacher RT	HOC1; 12	OSC; Ret	MUG; 14	NÜR; 20	LAU; 10	NOR; 12	ZAN; 16	BAR; 21	HOC2; 22										16th	17
2009	tolimit/Seyffarth Motorsport	HOC1; 8	LAU; Ret	NOR; Ret	ZAN; 7	OSC; 17	NÜR; 14	BAR; Ret	DIJ; Ret	HOC2; 9										15th	30
2010	Farnbacher Racing	HOC1; 2	VAL; 5	LAU; 16	NOR; 7	NÜR; 13	ZAN	BRH	OSC	HOC2										13th	43
2012	Farnbacher ESET Racing	HOC1; 1	HOC1; 2	LAU; 1	LAU; 2	NNS; 12	RBR; 1	RBR; 2	NOR; 1	NOR; 2	NÜR; 1	NÜR; 2	ZAN; 1	ZAN; 2	OSC; 1	OSC; 2	HOC2; 1	HOC2; 2		22nd	4
2014	Aust Motorsport	HOC1; 1; 25	HOC1; 2; 22	OSC; 1	OSC; 2	HUN; 1; 18	HUN; 2; 22	NOR; 1; 17	NOR; 2; 12	RBR; 1; 22	RBR; 2; 18	NÜR; 1; 7	NÜR; 2; 12	LAU; 1 Ret	LAU; 2 DNS	SAC; 1; 13	SAC; 2; 17	HOC2; 1; 17	HOC2; 2; 18	24th	15.5
2015	Aust Motorsport	HOC1; 1	HOC1; 2	NNS	LAU; 1	LAU; 2	NOR; 1	NOR; 2	ZAN; 1; 18	ZAN; 2; 14	RBR; 1; 13	RBR; 2; 13	OSC; 1; 11	OSC; 2; 14	NÜR; 1; 15	NÜR; 2; 18	HOC2; 1	HOC2; 2		19th	21

=== Complete ADAC GT Masters results ===
(key) (Races in bold indicate pole position) (Races in italics indicate fastest lap)

Year	Team	Car	1	2	3	4	5	6	7	8	9	10	11	12	13	14	15	16	DC	Points
2010	a-workx/Wieth Racing	Porsche 997 GT3-R	OSC1; 1; 1	OSC1; 2; 3	SAC; 1; 15	SAC; 2; 15	HOC; 1; 4	HOC; 2 Ret	ASS; 1; 5	ASS; 2; 8	LAU; 1; 9	LAU; 2; 5	NÜR; 1; 3	NÜR; 2; 2	OSC2; 1 DNS	OSC2; 2 DSQ			7th	44
2011	Farnbacher ESET Racing	Ferrari 458 Italia GT3	OSC; 1; 20	OSC; 2; 11	SAC; 1; 15	SAC; 2; 9	ZOL; 1 Ret	ZOL; 2; 8	NÜR; 1; 25	NÜR; 2; 7	RBR; 1; 11	RBR; 2; 13	LAU; 1; 29	LAU; 2; 2	ASS; 1; 7	ASS; 2; 1	HOC; 1; 6	HOC; 2; 2	10th	87
2012	Farnbacher ESET Racing	Ferrari 458 Italia GT3	OSC; 1; 13	OSC; 2 Ret	ZAN; 1; 12	ZAN; 2; 25	SAC; 1 DNS	SAC; 2 DNS											14th	54
2012	Farnbacher ESET Racing	Porsche 911 GT3 R							NÜR; 1; 10	NÜR; 2; 33	RBR; 1; 3	RBR; 2; 1	LAU; 1; 4	LAU; 2; 10	NÜR; 1; 13	NÜR; 2; 28	HOC; 1 Ret	HOC; 2 Ret	14th	54
2013	Callaway Competition	Corvette Z06.R GT3	OSC; 1 Ret	OSC; 2; 19	SPA; 1; 25	SPA; 2; 15													NC	0
2013	Vita4One Racing Team	BMW Z4 GT3					SAC; 1; 21	SAC; 2; 20	NÜR; 1; 18	NÜR; 2 Ret	RBR; 1 Ret	RBR; 2; 21	LAU; 1	LAU; 2	SVK; 1	SVK; 2	HOC; 1	HOC; 2	NC	0

=== Complete FIA GT Series results ===
(key) (Races in bold indicate pole position) (Races in italics indicate fastest lap)

Year	Team	Car	Class	1	2	3	4	5	6	7	8	9	10	11	12	Pos.	Points
2013	Dörr Motorsport	McLaren MP4-12C GT3	Pro	NOG; QR; Ret	NOG; CR; 17	ZOL; QR	ZOL; CR	ZAN; QR	ZAN; QR	SVK; QR	SVK; CR	NAV; QR	NAV; CR	BAK; QR	BAK; CR	21st	1
