= Christian Mamerow =

German racing driver (born 1985)

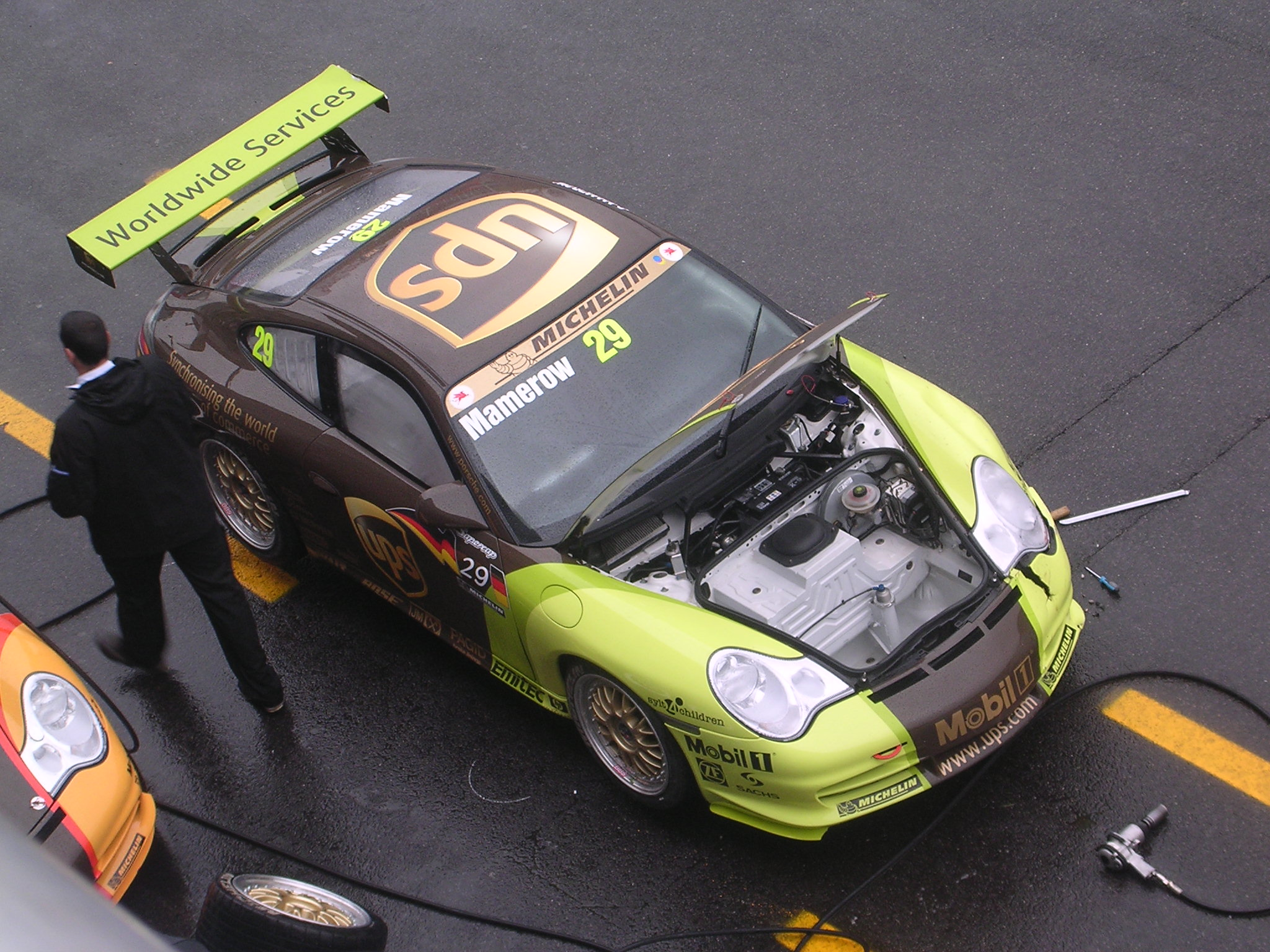
- Christian Mamerow's 2014 Porsche 996 GT3 Cup in Monza
- Nationality: (Germany) German
- Born: 25 February 1985 (age 41) Castrop-Rauxel, West Germany
- Relatives: Peter Mamerow (father)
- Categorisation: FIA Gold

Championship titles
- 2014: Nürburgring 24 Hours

Christian Mamerow (born 25 February 1985) is a German racing driver. A graduate of the Porsche Supercup, he went on to win the 2014 24 Hours of Nürburgring for Audi. He is the son of former DTM driver Peter Mamerow.

== Career ==
Mamerow began his motorsport career in 1997 in karting, which he practiced until 1999. In 2000, he switched to Formula BMW, where he remained until 2002. His best result there was fourth place overall in 2002. After a year without a permanent cockpit, he was given a place in the UPS Porsche Junior Team in 2004 and competed in the Porsche Carrera Cup Germany. There, he drove for Mamerow Racing from 2005 to 2008. He achieved his best placing of the season in his last year in the Carrera Cup 2008 with third place. At the same time, he also competed in the Porsche Supercup in 2004, 2006 and 2008. There, he also achieved his best overall result in the one-make cup in 2008.

In addition to his appearances in the Porsche one-make cups, Mamerow competed with his father in the BFGoodrich endurance championship in 2004 and in the newly named VLN endurance championship at the Nürburgring in 2010. In 2007, he won his first race in the racing series together with Peter Mamerow. From 2005 to 2019, Mamerow also competed in the Nürburgring 24 Hours. There, he finished second in 2012 with his fellow drivers from the Mamerow Racing team in an Audi R8 LMS ultra. In 2014, he won the long-distance race together with Christopher Haase, René Rast and Markus Winkelhock in an Audi R8 LMS ultra from Phoenix Racing. Mamerow drove in the ADAC GT Masters in 2007, 2012 and 2013. His first two years in the series he competed with Mamerow Racing and last season for Prosperia C. Abt Racing and one race for THE BOSS YACO Racing. His best overall placement was 13th place, which he achieved in 2007 with his father in a Porsche 911 GT3 Cup.

In 2009, Mamerow competed for various teams in the FIA GT3 European Championship. That year he also drove a race in the GT2 class of the FIA GT Championship for Trackspeed Racing. In 2013, 2015 and 2016, Mamerow competed in a few races in the Blancpain Endurance Series. In 2015, he scored 17 points in two races for Phoenix Racing and finished 16th overall. In 2015, he drove an Audi R8 LMS ultra for the Audi Team Racing Tech team in the GT300 class of the Super GT in Japan. He finished the season in 19th place.
