= Jan Seyffarth =

German racing driver (born 1986)

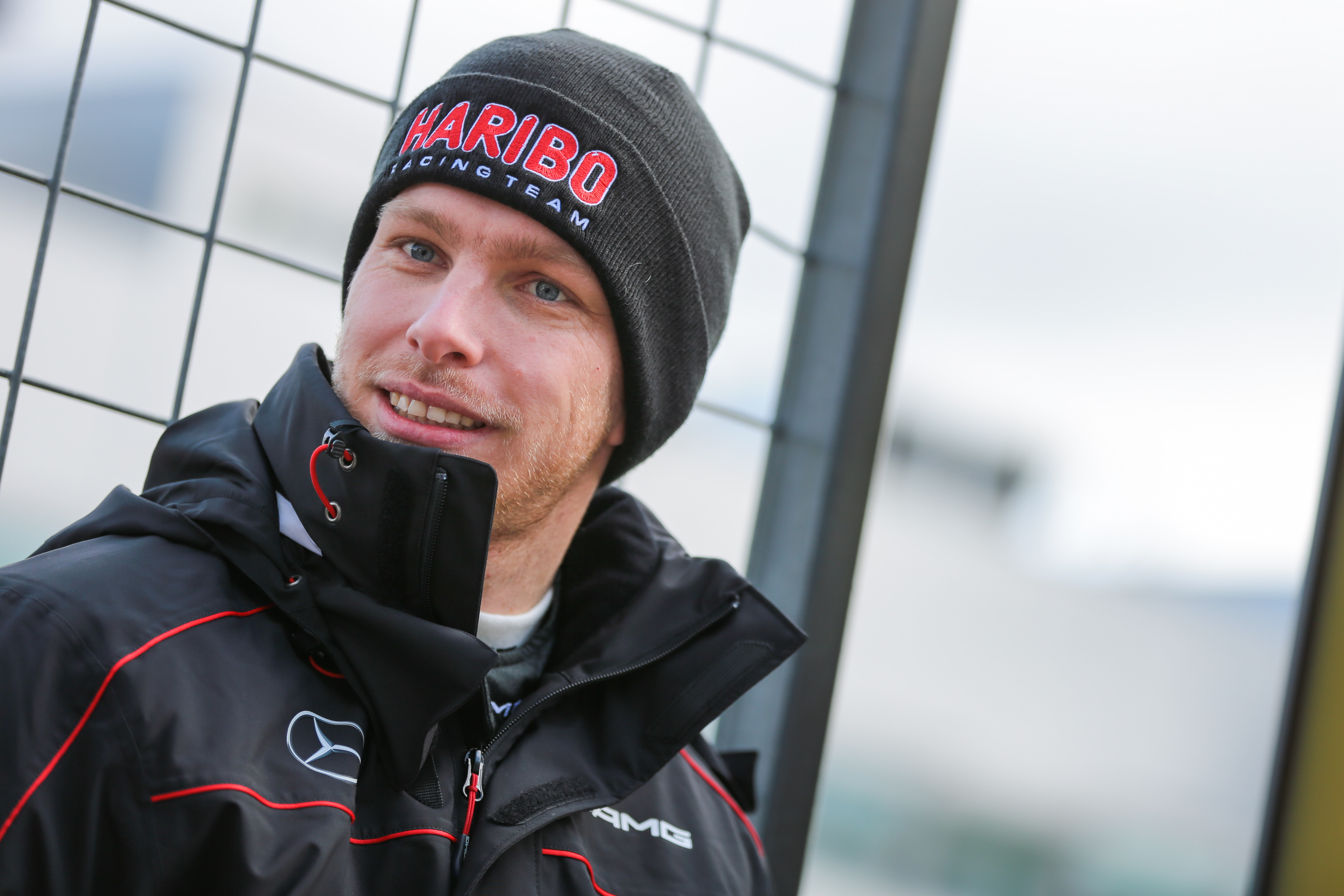
- Nationality: (Germany) German
- Born: 12 July 1986 (age 40) Querfurt, Bezirk Halle, East Germany

Porsche Supercup career
- Current team: Veltins MRS Racing
- Categorisation: FIA Gold
- Car number: 14
- Starts: 38 (1 non-championship race start)
- Wins: 1
- Poles: 1
- Fastest laps: 2
- Best finish: 5th in 2010

Jan Seyffarth (born 12 July 1986, in Querfurt, Bezirk Halle) is a German racing driver. He has competed in such series as the FIA GT3 European Championship, Rolex Sports Car Series and Porsche Supercup.

== Career results ==
=== Complete Porsche Supercup results ===
(key) (Races in bold indicate pole position) (Races in italics indicate fastest lap)

| Year | Team | Car | 1 | 2 | 3 | 4 | 5 | 6 | 7 | 8 | 9 | 10 | 11 | 12 | 13 | DC | Points |
|---|---|---|---|---|---|---|---|---|---|---|---|---|---|---|---|---|---|
| 2005 | UPS Porsche Junior Team | Porsche 997 GT3 | ITA | ESP; 12 | MON | GER | USA | USA | FRA | GBR; 9 | GER; 3 | HUN; 9 | ITA; 9 | BEL | | NC | 0‡ |
| 2006 | UPS Porsche Junior Team | Porsche 997 GT3 | BHR; 9 | ITA | GER | ESP; 5 | MON; 12 | GBR; 12 | USA | USA | FRA | GER; 12 | HUN; Ret | ITA; 7 | | NC | 0‡ |
| 2008 | Konrad Motorsport | Porsche 997 GT3 | BHR; 3 | BHR; 5 | **ESP**; 1 | TUR; 2 | MON; 8 | FRA; 7 | GBR; Ret | GER; 17 | HUN; 16 | | | | | 8th | 93 |
| 2008 | Tolimit Motorsport | Porsche 997 GT3 | | | | | | | | | | ESP; 16 | BEL; 10 | ITA; 29† | | 8th | 93 |
| 2009 | Tolimit Motorsport | Porsche 997 GT3 | BHR | BHR | ESP | MON | TUR | GBR | GER; 7 | HUN; 2 | ESP | BEL; 3 | ITA | UAE | UAE | NC | 0‡ |
| 2010 | Veltins MRS Racing | Porsche 997 GT3 | BHR; 3 | BHR; 11 | ESP; 6 | MON; 18 | ESP; 11 | GBR; 9 | GER; 2 | HUN; 8 | BEL; 4 | ITA; 5 | | | | 5th | 97 |

† — Did not finish the race, but was classified as he completed over 90% of the race distance.

‡ Guest Driver — Ineligible for points

=== FIA GT Series results ===
| Year | Class | Team | Car | 1 | 2 | 3 | 4 | 5 | 6 | 7 | 8 | 9 | 10 | 11 | 12 | Pos. | Points |
|---|---|---|---|---|---|---|---|---|---|---|---|---|---|---|---|---|---|
| 2013 | Pro | Seyffarth Motorsport | Mercedes-Benz | NOG; QR; 6 | NOG; CR; 10 | ZOL; QR; 10 | ZOL; CR; DNS | ZAN; QR; 8 | ZAN; QR; 4 | SVK; QR; Ret | SVK; CR; 10 | NAV; QR | NAV; CR | TBA; QR | TBA; CR | 14th | 31 |

Sporting positions
| Preceded by Diego Romanini | Austria Formula 3 Cup champion 2004 | Succeeded by Florian Schnitzenbaumer |
