= Attempto Racing =

German racing team

(Germany) Attempto Racing
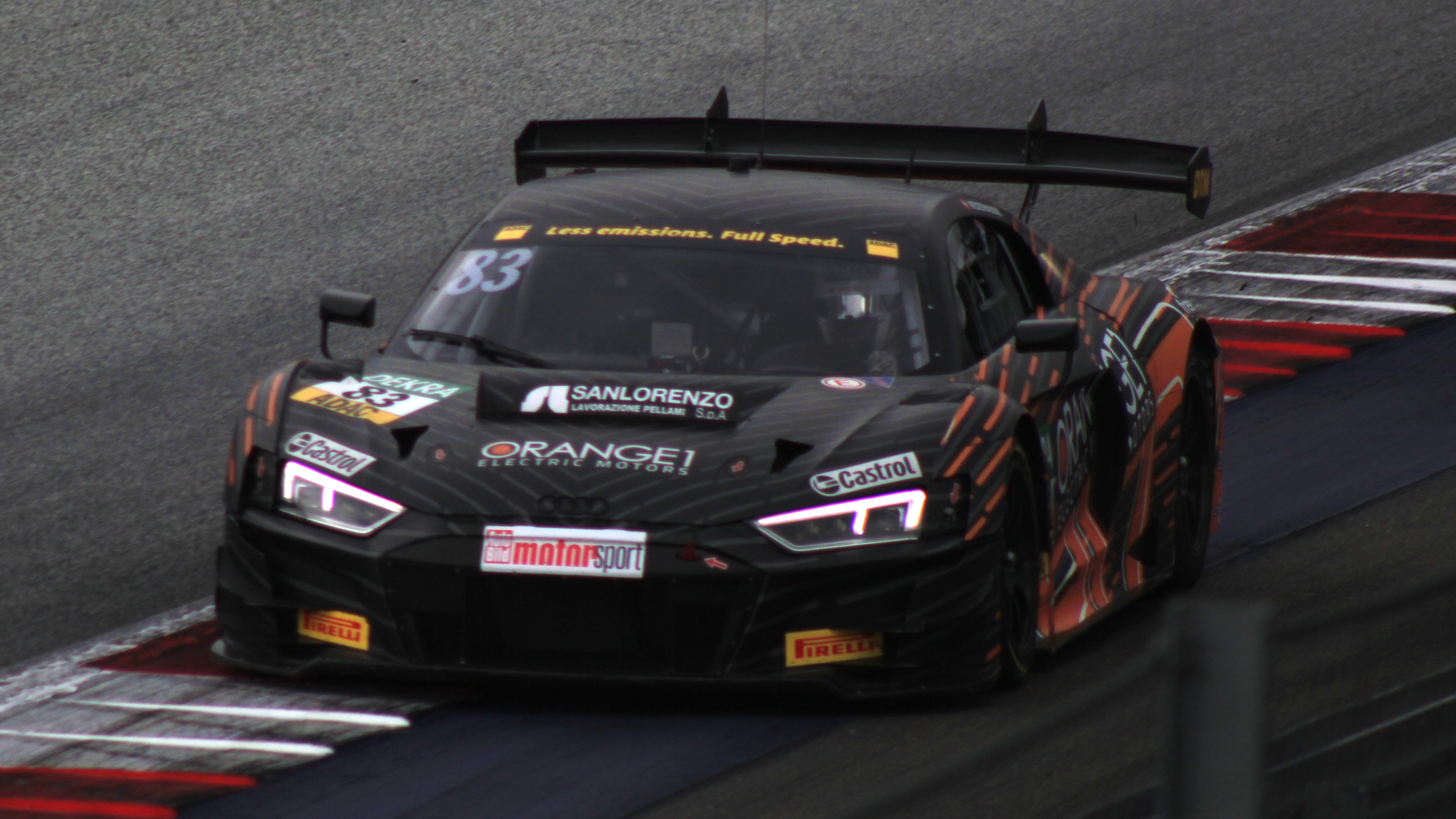
- Founded: 2005
- Base: Langenhagen, Germany
- Team principal(s): Arkin Aka
- Current series: GT World Challenge Europe Endurance Cup; GT World Challenge Europe Sprint Cup; International GT Open; Italian GT; Middle East Trophy
- Current drivers: (Germany) Christopher Haase (Germany) Alex Aka (Switzerland) Ricardo Feller (Germany) Dennis Marschall (Luxembourg) Dylan Pereira (Italy) Lorenzo Patrese (Netherlands) Glenn van Berlo (Italy) Lorenzo Ferrari (Austria) Max Hofer (Italy) Leonardo Moncini (Germany) Florian Scholze; Alexey Nesov; Andrey Mukovoz
- Website: https://attemptoracing.de/

Attempto Racing is a German racing team founded in 2005 by Arkin Aka. It has competed in various championships such as Porsche Supercup, Porsche Carrera Cup Germany, ADAC GT Masters, DTM and the GT World Challenge Europe.

== History ==
Founded by Arkin Aka in 2005, Attempto Racing began racing lower-rank Porsche competitions before settling in Porsche Carrera Cup. The team notably won both the Porsche Supercup and Porsche Carrera Cup Germany in 2013, with Nicki Thiim and Kévin Estre respectively. In 2015, Attempto entered the GT3 scene with McLaren and Porsche in the Blancpain GT Series. Full campaigns with Porsche and Lamborghini followed, before the team inked a deal with Audi to field the R8 LMS from 2018 onwards. The partnership bore fruit immediately, as Kelvin van der Linde and Steijn Schothorst won on debut at Zolder.

In late 2019, Attempto achieved a one-two finish at the Gulf 12 Hours, before securing a historic podium at the flagship Spa 24 Hours the following year. In 2023, in collaboration with Tresor Competition and Orange1, the team expanded to three cars and won its first major title, the GT World Challenge Europe Sprint Cup, with Ricardo Feller and Mattia Drudi. It also competed in the Deutsche Tourenwagen Masters in 2022 and 2023.
