= Sven Müller (racing driver) =

German racing driver

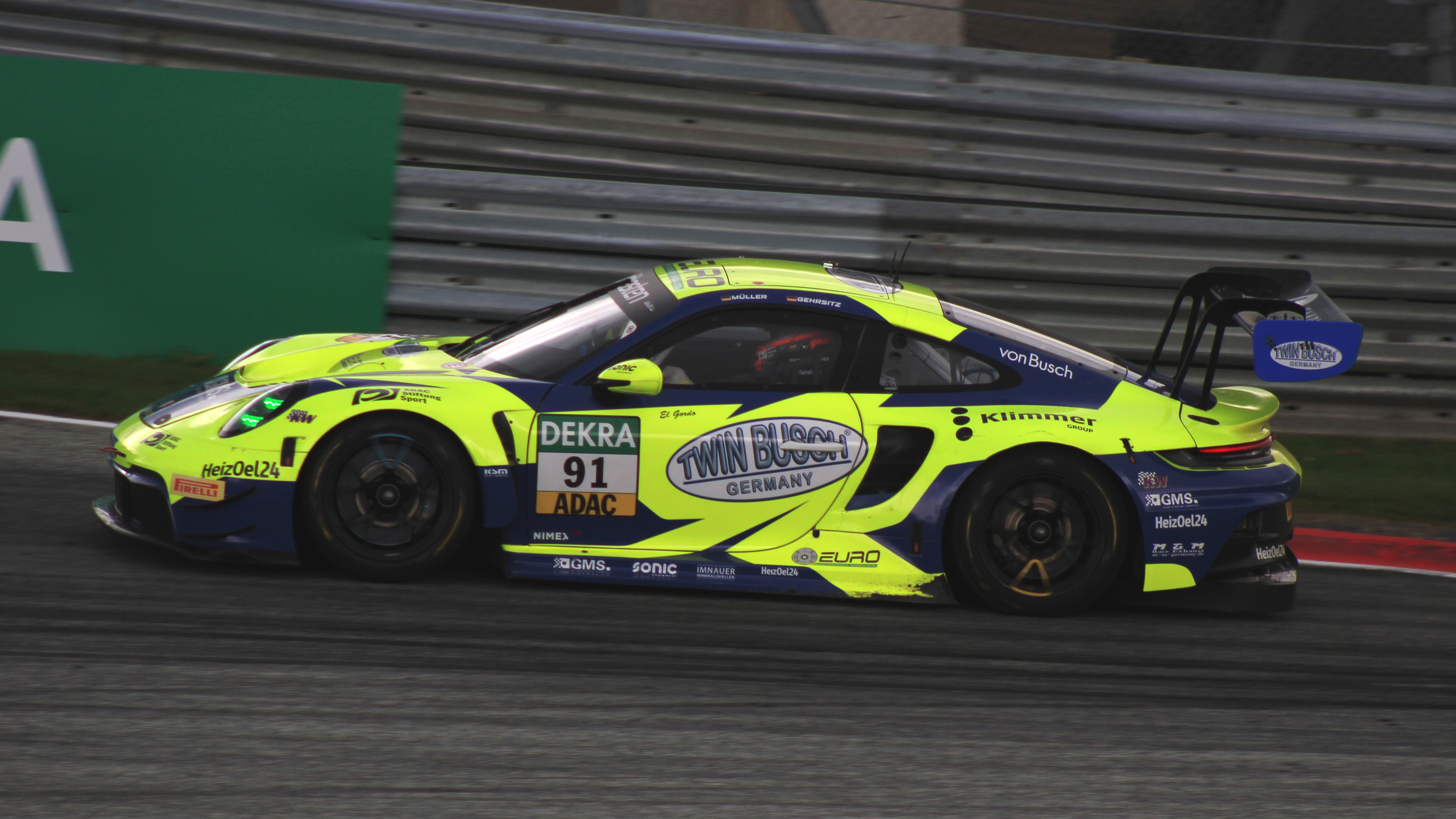
- Müller racing in the ADAC GT Masters in 2023
- Nationality: (Germany) German
- Born: 7 February 1992 (age 34) Mainz, Germany

ADAC GT Masters career
- Debut season: 2017
- Current team: Team Joos by RACEmotion
- Categorisation: FIA Silver (until 2015); FIA Gold (2016–)

Sven Müller (born 7 February 1992, in Mainz) is a German-Swiss racing driver. He won the Porsche Supercup title in 2016 and the GT World Challenge Europe Endurance Cup in 2025.

== Career ==
Müller began his racing career in karting 2004. He remained in karting until 2009. In 2010, he started for Eifelland Racing in the ADAC Formel Masters, a formula racing series. He regularly scored points and concluded his first season on the ninth championship position. In 2011, Müller participated in the ADAC Formula Masters for ma-con Motorsport. He won four races and finished 12 times on the podium. He finished third in the standings behind Pascal Wehrlein and Emil Bernstorff.

In 2012, Müller raced for Prema Powerteam in the FIA Formula 3 European Championship. He collected three podiums and eighth place in the final standings. In 2013, he competed in the first seven rounds with Ma-con and the remaining three with Van Amersfoort, resulting ninth with a podium and four top-five finishes.

Müller raced at the Porsche Carrera Cup Germany in 2014, after joining the Porsche Junioren factory team. In 2015, he celebrated his first win of Porsche Mobil 1 Supercup in Hungary on the Hungaroring.

== Racing record ==
=== Career summary ===
Season	Series	Team	Races	Wins	Poles	F/Laps	Podiums	Points	Position
2010	ADAC Formel Masters	Eifelland Racing	21	0	0	0	0	50	9th
2011	ADAC Formel Masters	ma-con Motorsport	24	4	1	1	12	296	**3rd**
2012	FIA Formula 3 European Championship	Prema Powerteam	20	0	2	0	3	109	8th
2012	Formula 3 Euro Series	Prema Powerteam	24	0	2	1	6	172	6th
2012	Macau Grand Prix	Prema Powerteam	2	0	0	0	0	N/A	19th
2012	Masters of Formula 3	Prema Powerteam	1	0	0	0	0	N/A	10th
2013	FIA Formula 3 European Championship	ma-con	21	0	0	0	0	122	9th
2013	FIA Formula 3 European Championship	Van Amersfoort Racing	9	0	0	0	1	122	9th
2013	Masters of Formula 3	ma-con	1	0	0	0	0	N/A	DNF
2014	Porsche Carrera Cup Germany	Team Deutsche Post by Project 1	18	0	1	2	5	186	4th
2014	Porsche Supercup	Team Project 1	10	1	0	1	2	95	7th
2015	Porsche Carrera Cup Germany	Lechner Racing Middle East	13	2	1	2	5	144	7th
2015	Porsche Supercup	Lechner Racing Middle East	10	4	3	3	6	126	**2nd**
2015	FIA World Endurance Championship - LMGTE Pro	Porsche Team Manthey	1	0	0	0	1	15	16th
2015	24H Series - A6	Fach Auto Tech	1	0	0	0	0	N/A	NC
2015	24 Hours of Nürburgring - SP7	Manthey Racing	1	0	0	1	0	N/A	DNF
2016	Porsche Carrera Cup Germany	Konrad Motorsport	16	10	9	10	12	271	**1st**
2016	Porsche Supercup	Lechner MSG Racing Team	10	3	2	3	8	163	**1st**
2016	IMSA SportsCar Championship - GTD	Frikadelli Racing	1	0	0	0	0	41	33rd
2016	IMSA SportsCar Championship - GTD	Team Seattle / Alex Job Racing	1	0	0	0	0	41	33rd
2016	24H Series - 991	Lechner Racing Middle East	1	1	0	0	1	N/A	NC
2017	ADAC GT Masters	Precote Herberth Motorsport	14	1	0	0	2	76	12th
2017	IMSA SportsCar Championship - GTD	Manthey Racing	1	0	0	0	0	5	84th
2017	24H Series - A6	Manthey Racing	1	0	0	0	1	N/A	NC
2017	24 Hours of Nürburgring - SP9	Manthey Racing	1	0	0	0	0	N/A	DNF
2017	Super GT – GT300	D'station Racing	5	0	0	1	2	28	11th
2017	Intercontinental GT Challenge	Herberth Motorsport	1	0	0	0	0	6	13th
2017	Intercontinental GT Challenge	GMG Racing	1	0	0	0	0	6	13th
2018	IMSA SportsCar Championship - GTD	Manthey Racing	1	0	0	0	0	11	64th
2018	24H GT Series - A6	Manthey Racing	1	0	0	0	1	N/A	N/C
2018	24H GT Series - SP4	Manthey Racing	1	1	1	1	1	N/A	N/C
2018	Super GT – GT300	D'station Racing	8	0	0	0	1	35	9th
2018	Intercontinental GT Challenge	D'station Racing	1	0	0	0	0	0	NC
2018	24 Hours of Le Mans - LMGTE Pro	Porsche GT Team	1	0	0	0	0	N/A	DNF
2018	24 Hours of Nürburgring - SP9	Falken Motorsports	1	0	0	0	0	N/A	8th
2019	Blancpain GT Series Endurance Cup	Rowe Racing	5	0	1	0	0	32	7th
2019	Blancpain GT World Challenge Europe	Dinamic Motorsport	2	0	0	0	0	0	NC
2019	IMSA SportsCar Championship - GTD	NGT Motorsport by Herberth	1	0	0	0	0	10	68th
2019	Intercontinental GT Challenge	EBM	2	0	0	0	0	29	17th
2019	Intercontinental GT Challenge	Park Place Motorsports	1	0	0	0	1	29	17th
2019	Intercontinental GT Challenge	Rowe Racing	1	0	0	0	0	29	17th
2019	Intercontinental GT Challenge	KÜS Team75 Bernhard	1	0	0	0	0	29	17th
2019	24H GT Series - A6	Herberth Motorsport	1	0	0	0	1	N/A	NC
2019	24 Hours of Le Mans - LMGTE Pro	Porsche GT Team	1	0	0	0	0	N/A	7th
2019	24 Hours of Nürburgring - SP9	Frikadelli Racing Team	1	0	0	0	0	N/A	DNF
2020	ADAC GT Masters	Precote Herberth Motorsport	12	1	1	0	6	109	7th
2020	GT World Challenge Europe Endurance Cup	Dinamic Motorsport	4	1	0	0	2	53	**3rd**
2020	IMSA SportsCar Championship - GTD	Black Swan Racing	1	0	0	0	0	26	43rd
2020	24H GT Series - GT3	Herberth Motorsport	1	0	0	0	0	N/A	N(C
2020	24 Hours of Nürburgring - SP9	Falken Motorsports	1	0	0	0	0	N/A	10th
2021	ADAC GT Masters	Precote Herberth Motorsport	14	0	0	0	0	46	20th
2021	GT World Challenge Europe Endurance Cup	Rutronik Racing	1	0	0	0	0	0	NC
2021	IMSA SportsCar Championship - LMP2	RWR Eurasia	2	0	0	0	0	0	NC†
2021	24H GT Series - GT3	Herberth Motorsport	0	0	0	0	0	N/A	N/C
2021	24 Hours of Nürburgring - SP9	Falken Motorsports	1	0	0	0	0	N/A	4th
2022	ADAC GT Masters	Allied-Racing	14	0	0	0	2	106	10th
2022	GT World Challenge Europe Endurance Cup	Toksport WRT	1	0	0	0	0	0	NC
2022	Intercontinental GT Challenge	Toksport WRT	1	0	0	0	0	N/A	NC
2022	24H GT Series - GT3	Grove Motorsport by Herberth Motorsport	1	0	0	0	0	N/A	NC
2022	24 Hours of Nürburgring - SP9	Falken Motorsports	1	0	0	0	0	N/A	9th
2022-23	Middle East Trophy - GT3	Pure Rxcing	1	0	0	0	0	N/A	NC
2023	ADAC GT Masters	Team Joos by RACEmotion	12	1	0	2	5	151	5th
2023	GT World Challenge Europe Endurance Cup	Dinamic GT	2	0	0	0	0	11	16th
2023	GT World Challenge Europe Endurance Cup	Dinamic GT Huber Racing	3	0	0	0	0	11	16th
2023	Intercontinental GT Challenge	Dinamic GT Huber Racing	1	0	0	0	0	6	27th
2023	24 Hours of Nürburgring - SP9	Falken Motorsports	1	0	0	0	0	N/A	DNF
2023-24	Middle East Trophy - GT3	Proton Huber Competition	1	0	0	0	1	N/A	
2024	GT World Challenge Europe Endurance Cup	Rutronik Racing	5	0	1	0	0	13	17th
2024	GT World Challenge Europe Sprint Cup	Rutronik Racing	10	1	1	0	3	41	5th
2024	Intercontinental GT Challenge	Rutronik Racing	1	0	0	0	0	22	11th
2024	Intercontinental GT Challenge	Falken Motorsports	1	0	0	0	0	22	11th
2024	Nürburgring Langstrecken-Serie - SP9	Falken Motorsports	3	2	1	0	2	0	NC†
2024	24 Hours of Nürburgring - SP9	Falken Motorsports	1	0	0	0	0	N/A	6th
2024	Le Mans Cup - GT3	High Class Racing	4	0	0	0	2	34.5	7th
2024	Gulf 12 Hours	Proton Huber Competition	1	0	0	0	1	N/A	**3rd**
2025	British GT Championship - GT3	Team Parker Racing	8	0	0	0	0	32	14th
2025	Nürburgring Langstrecken-Serie - SP9	Falken Motorsports	3	2	0	0	3	N/A	NC
2025	24 Hours of Nürburgring - SP9	Falken Motorsports	1	0	0	0	0	N/A	DNF
2025	Intercontinental GT Challenge	Falken Motorsports	1	0	0	0	0	25	15th
2025	Intercontinental GT Challenge	EBM GIGA Racing	2	0	0	0	0	25	15th
2025	Intercontinental GT Challenge	Rutronik Racing	1	1	0	0	1	25	15th
2025	GT World Challenge Europe Endurance Cup	Rutronik Racing	5	0	0	0	3	73	**1st**
2025	GT World Challenge Europe Sprint Cup	Rutronik Racing	10	1	0	0	4	69.5	5th
2025-26	24H Series Middle East - GT3	Herberth Motorsport							
2026	IMSA SportsCar Championship - GTD	RS1	1	0	0	0	0	111	82nd
2026	Super GT – GT300	Seven x Seven Racing	8	0	0	0	2	82	**2nd**
2026	Nürburgring Langstrecken-Serie - SP9	Falken Motorsports							
2026	Nürburgring Langstrecken-Serie - SP9	Dunlop Motorsports							
2026	24 Hours of Nürburgring - SP9	Falken Motorsports	1	0	0	0	0	N/A	DNF
2026	GT World Challenge Europe Endurance Cup	Rutronik Racing	3	0	0	0	0	0	NC
2026	GT World Challenge Europe Sprint Cup	Boutsen VDS	2	0	0	1	0	0	NC†

† As Müller was a guest driver, he was ineligible to score points.

=== Complete Porsche Supercup results ===
(key) (Races in bold indicate pole position) (Races in italics indicate fastest lap)

Year	Team	1	2	3	4	5	6	7	8	9	10	11	Pos.	Points
2014	Team Project 1	ESP; 10	MON; 6	AUT; 3	GBR; 6	GER; 11	HUN; Ret	BEL; 4	**ITA**; 1	USA; 8	USA; 10		7th	95
2015	Lechner Racing Middle East	ESP; Ret	MON; 10	AUT; 10	GBR; Ret	**HUN**; 1	BEL; 1	BEL; 2	ITA; 1	ITA; 1	**USA**; C	**USA**; 3	2nd	126
2016	Lechner MSG Racing Team	ESP; 2	MON; 13	AUT; 1	GBR; 1	HUN; 1	**GER**; 2	**BEL**; 2	ITA; 3	USA; 2	USA; 8		1st	163

=== Complete FIA World Endurance Championship results ===
Year	Entrant	Class	Chassis	Engine	1	2	3	4	5	6	7	8	Pos.	Points
2015	Porsche Team Manthey	LMGTE Pro	Porsche 911 RSR	Porsche 4.0 L Flat-6	SIL	SPA; 3	LMS	NÜR	COA	FUJ	SHA	BHR	22nd	15

=== Complete 24 Hours of Nürburgring results ===
Year	Team	Co-Drivers	Car	Class	Laps	Ovr. Pos.	Class Pos.
2015	(Germany) Manthey Racing	(Germany) Christoph Breuer (Italy) Matteo Cairoli (Germany) Mike Stursberg	Porsche 911 GT3 Cup MR	SP7	44	DNF	DNF
2017	(Germany) Manthey Racing	(Switzerland) Steve Smith (Austria) Harald Proczyk (Germany) “Randy Walls”	Porsche 911 GT3 R	SP9	102	DNF	DNF
2018	(Germany) Falken Motorsports	(Austria) Klaus Bachler (Austria) Martin Ragginger (Germany) Dirk Werner	Porsche 911 GT3 R	SP9	132	9th	8th
2019	(Germany) Frikadelli Racing Team	(Australia) Matt Campbell (France) Romain Dumas (France) Mathieu Jaminet	Porsche 911 GT3 R	SP9	134	DNF	DNF
2020	(Germany) Falken Motorsports	(Austria) Klaus Bachler (United Kingdom) Peter Dumbreck (Austria) Martin Ragginger	Porsche 911 GT3 R	SP9	84	10th	10th
2021	(Germany) Falken Motorsports	(Austria) Klaus Bachler (Belgium) Alessio Picariello (Austria) Martin Ragginger	Porsche 911 GT3 R	SP9	59	4th	4th
2022	(Germany) Falken Motorsports	(New Zealand) Jaxon Evans (France) Patrick Pilet (Germany) Marco Seefried	Porsche 911 GT3 R	SP9 Pro	58	DNF	DNF
2023	(Germany) Falken Motorsports	(Austria) Klaus Bachler (Belgium) Alessio Picariello	Porsche 911 GT3 R (992)	SP9 Pro	77	DNF	DNF
2024	(Germany) Falken Motorsports	(France) Julien Andlauer (Austria) Klaus Bachler (Belgium) Alessio Picariello	Porsche 911 GT3 R (992)	SP9 Pro	50	6th	6th
2025	(Germany) Falken Motorsports	(France) Julien Andlauer (Germany) Nico Menzel (Belgium) Alessio Picariello	Porsche 911 GT3 R (992)	SP9 Pro	23	DNF	DNF
2026	(Germany) Falken Motorsports	(Austria) Klaus Bachler (Germany) Tim Heinemann (Netherlands) Morris Schuring	Porsche 911 GT3 R (992.2)	SP9 Pro	53	DNF	DNF

=== Complete IMSA SportsCar Championship results ===
(key) (Races in bold indicate pole position; races in italics indicate fastest lap)

Year	Entrant	Class	Make	Engine	1	2	3	4	5	6	7	8	9	10	11	12	Pos.	Points
2016	Frikadelli Racing	GTD	Porsche 911 GT3 R	Porsche 4.0L Flat-6	DAY; 12	SEB	LGA	DET	WGL	MOS	LIM						33rd	41
2016	Alex Job Racing	GTD	Porsche 911 GT3 R	Porsche 4.0L Flat-6								ELK; 11	VIR	COA	PET		33rd	41
2017	Manthey Racing	GTD	Porsche 911 GT3 R	Porsche 4.0L Flat-6	DAY; 26	SEB	LBH	COA	DET	WGL	MOS	LIM	ELK	VIR	LGA	PET	84th	5
2018	Manthey Racing	GTD	Porsche 911 GT3 R	Porsche 4.0L Flat-6	DAY; 20	SEB	MDO	DET	WGL	MOS	LIM	ELK	VIR	LGA	PET		64th	11
2019	NGT Motorsport	GTD	Porsche 911 GT3 R	Porsche 4.0L Flat-6	DAY; 21	SEB	MDO	DET	WGL	MOS	LIM	ELK	VIR	LGA	PET		68th	10
2020	Black Swan Racing	GTD	Porsche 911 GT3 R	Porsche 4.0 L Flat-6	DAY; 5	DAY	SEB	ELK	VIR	ATL	MDO	CLT	PET	LGA	SEB		43rd	26
2021	RWR Eurasia	LMP2	Ligier JS P217	Gibson GK428 4.2 L V8	DAY; 4†	SEB	WGL	WGL	ELK	LGA	PET						NC†	0†
2026	RS1	GTD	Porsche 911 GT3 R (992.2)	Porsche 4.2 L Flat-6	DAY; 21	SEB	LBH	LGA	WGL	MOS	ELK	VIR	IMS	PET			82nd	111

^{†} Points only counted towards the Michelin Endurance Cup, and not the overall LMP2 Championship.

=== Complete ADAC GT Masters results ===
(key) (Races in bold indicate pole position) (Races in italics indicate fastest lap)

Year	Team	Car	1	2	3	4	5	6	7	8	9	10	11	12	13	14	Pos.	Points
2017	Precote Herberth Motorsport	Porsche 911 GT3 R	OSC; 1; 7	OSC; 2; 3	LAU; 1; 1	LAU; 2 Ret	RBR; 1; 12	RBR; 2; 25	ZAN; 1; 19	ZAN; 2; 4	NÜR; 1 Ret	NÜR; 2 Ret	SAC; 1; 9	SAC; 2; 8	HOC; 1; 12	HOC; 2; 4	12th	76
2020	Precote Herberth Motorsport	Porsche 911 GT3 R	LAU; 1 Ret	LAU; 2; 3	NÜR; 1; 7	NÜR; 2; 1	HOC; 1; 7	HOC; 2; 6	SAC; 1; 2	SAC; 2 Ret	RBR; 1; 2	RBR; 2 Ret	LAU; 1	LAU; 2	OSC; 1	OSC; 2	7th	109
2021	Precote Herberth Motorsport	Porsche 911 GT3 R	OSC; 1; 9	OSC; 2; 9	RBR; 1; 9	RBR; 2 Ret	ZAN; 1; 4	ZAN; 2 Ret	LAU; 1; 17	LAU; 2; 13	SAC; 1; 18	SAC; 2; 12	HOC; 1 Ret	HOC; 2 Ret	NÜR; 1 Ret	NÜR; 2; 11	20th	46
2022	Allied-Racing	Porsche 911 GT3 R	OSC; 1 DSQ^{3}	OSC; 2; 14	RBR; 1; 4	RBR; 2; 4	ZAN; 1; 11	ZAN; 2; 5	NÜR; 1; 2	NÜR; 2; 3	LAU; 1; 15	LAU; 2; 11^{2}	SAC; 1; 16	SAC; 2; 9	HOC; 1; 12	HOC; 2; 10	10th	106
2023	Team Joos by RACEmotion	Porsche 911 GT3 R (992)	HOC; 1; 5	HOC; 2; 1^{3}	NOR; 1; 3	NOR; 2; 2^{2}	NÜR; 1; 10	NÜR; 2; 3^{3}	SAC; 1; 5	SAC; 2; 8	RBR; 1 Ret	RBR; 2; 2^{3}	HOC; 1; 4	HOC; 2 Ret			5th	151

=== Complete Super GT results ===
(key) (Races in bold indicate pole position) (Races in italics indicate fastest lap)

Year	Team	Car	Class	1	2	3	4	5	6	7	8	Pos.	Points
2017	D'station Racing	Porsche 911 GT3	GT300	OKA; 9	FUJ; 3	AUT	SUG	FUJ	SUZ; 10	CHA; 3	MOT; 9	11th	28
2018	D'station Racing	Porsche 911 GT3	GT300	OKA; 2	FUJ; 6	SUZ; 11	CHA; 8	FUJ; 7	SUG; 12	AUT; 8	MOT; 7	9th	35
2026	Seven x Seven Racing	Porsche 911 GT3 R (992.2)	GT300	OKA; 12	FUJ; 4	FUJ; 6	SUZ; 14	SUG; 4	AUT; DSQ	MOT; 2	MOT; 2	2nd	82

=== Complete GT World Challenge Europe results ===
(key) (Races in bold indicate pole position; results in italics indicate fastest lap)

==== GT World Challenge Europe Endurance Cup ====
Year	Team	Car	Class	1	2	3	4	5	6	7	Pos.	Points
2017	Herberth Motorsport	Porsche 911 GT3 R	Pro-Am	MNZ	SIL	LEC	SPA; 6H; 36	SPA; 12H; 37	SPA; 24H; 29	CAT	37th	7
2019	Rowe Racing	Porsche 911 GT3 R	Pro	MNZ; 21	SIL; 4	LEC; Ret	SPA; 6H; 36	SPA; 12H; 9	SPA; 24H; 5	**CAT**; 6	7th	32
2020	Dinamic Motorsport	Porsche 911 GT3 R	Pro	IMO; 10	NÜR; 1	SPA; 6H; 13	SPA; 12H; 7	SPA; 24H; 3	LEC; 10		3rd	53
2021	Rutronik Racing	Porsche 911 GT3 R	Pro	MNZ	LEC	SPA; 6H; 58†	SPA; 12H; 58†	SPA; 24H; Ret	NÜR	CAT	NC	0
2022	Toksport WRT	Porsche 911 GT3 R	Pro	IMO	LEC	SPA; 6H; 23	SPA; 12H; 16	SPA; 24H; Ret	HOC	CAT	NC	0
2023	Dinamic GT Huber Racing	Porsche 911 GT3 R (992)	Pro	MNZ; 9	LEC; Ret	SPA; 6H; 16	SPA; 12H; 13	SPA; 24H; 12			15th	13
2023	Dinamic GT	Porsche 911 GT3 R (992)	Pro						NÜR; 10	CAT; 6	15th	13
2024	Rutronik Racing	Porsche 911 GT3 R (992)	Pro	LEC; 5	SPA; 6H; 38	SPA; 12H; 25	SPA; 24H; 9	**NÜR**; Ret	MNZ; 13	JED; 36†	17th	13
2025	Rutronik Racing	Porsche 911 GT3 R (992)	Pro	LEC; 2	MNZ; 21	SPA; 6H; 4	SPA; 12H; 6	SPA; 24H; 2	NÜR; 3	CAT; 7	1st	73
2026	Rutronik Racing	Porsche 911 GT3 R (992.2)	Bronze	LEC	MNZ; 38†	SPA; 6H; 29	SPA; 12H; 25	SPA; 24H; 43	NÜR; Ret	ALG	21st	17

==== GT World Challenge Europe Sprint Cup ====
Year	Team	Car	Class	1	2	3	4	5	6	7	8	9	10	Pos.	Points
2019	Dinamic Motorsport	Porsche 911 GT3 R	Pro	BRH; 1	BRH; 2	MIS; 1	MIS; 2	ZAN; 1	ZAN; 2	NÜR; 1	NÜR; 2	HUN; 1; 28	HUN; 2; 27	NC	0
2024	Rutronik Racing	Porsche 911 GT3 R (992)	Pro	BRH; 1; 14	BRH; 2; 8	MIS; 1; 7	MIS; 2; 5	HOC; 1; 7	HOC; 2; 14	MAG; 1; 3	MAG; 2; 16	CAT; 1; 2	**CAT**; **2**; 1	5th	41
2025	Rutronik Racing	Porsche 911 GT3 R (992)	Pro	BRH; 1; 9	BRH; 2; 3	ZAN; 1; 1	ZAN; 2; 5	MIS; 1; 7	MIS; 2; 3	MAG; 1; 2	MAG; 2; 5	VAL; 1; 14	VAL; 2; 5	5th	69.5
2026	Boutsen VDS	Porsche 911 GT3 R (992.2)	Pro	BRH; 1	BRH; 2	MIS; 1	MIS; 2	MAG; 1	MAG; 2	ZAN; 1	ZAN; 2	CAT; 1; 6	CAT; 2 Ret	NC‡	0‡

=== Complete 24 Hours of Le Mans results ===
Year	Team	Co-Drivers	Car	Class	Laps	Pos.	Class Pos.
2018	(United States) Porsche GT Team	(France) Romain Dumas (Germany) Timo Bernhard	Porsche 911 RSR	LMGTE Pro	92	DNF	DNF
2019	(United States) Porsche GT Team	(France) Mathieu Jaminet (Norway) Dennis Olsen	Porsche 911 RSR	LMGTE Pro	339	27th	7th

=== Complete British GT Championship results ===
(key) (Races in bold indicate pole position) (Races in italics indicate fastest lap)

Year	Team	Car	Class	1	2	3	4	5	6	7	8	9	Pos.	Points
2025	Team Parker Racing	Porsche 911 GT3 R (992)	GT3	DON; 1; 22†	SIL; 1; 15	OUL; 1; 6	OUL; 2; 6	SPA; 1	SNE; 1; 6	SNE; 2; 6	BRH; 1; 18†	DON; 1 Ret	14th	32

^{†} Driver did not finish, but was classified as he completed 90% race distance.

Sporting positions
Preceded by Philipp Eng	Porsche Carrera Cup Germany; Champion; 2016	Succeeded by Dennis Olsen
Preceded by Philipp Eng	Porsche Supercup; Champion; 2016	Succeeded by Michael Ammermüller
