= 2019 Blancpain GT Series Endurance Cup =

Sports season

The 2019 Blancpain GT Series Endurance Cup was the ninth season of the Blancpain GT Series Endurance Cup. The season began on 14 April at Monza and ended on 29 September in Barcelona. The season featured five rounds, with each race lasting for a duration of three hours besides the 24 Hours of Spa and the 1000 km Paul Ricard events.

== Calendar ==
At the annual press conference during the 2018 24 Hours of Spa on 27 July, the Stéphane Ratel Organisation announced the first draft of the 2019 calendar. The World Challenge Europe round at the Nürburgring would become an Endurance Cup round, replacing the round in Barcelona, before the two tracks were swapped around again in the final draft of the calendar released on 22 October.

Round	Race	Circuit	Date	
1	3 Hours of Monza	Autodromo Nazionale Monza, Monza, Italy	14 April	
2	3 Hours of Silverstone	(United Kingdom) Silverstone Circuit, Silverstone, Great Britain	12 May	
3	Circuit Paul Ricard 1000 km	Circuit Paul Ricard, Le Castellet, France	1 June	
4	Total 24 Hours of Spa	Circuit de Spa-Francorchamps, Stavelot, Belgium	27–28 July	Report
5	3 Hours of Barcelona	Circuit de Barcelona-Catalunya, Montmeló, Spain	29 September	

== Entry list ==
Team	Car	No.	Drivers	Class	Rounds
(Japan) Goodsmile Racing & Type-Moon Racing (Note: Car No. 00 entered as Goodsmile Racing & Type-Moon Racing under Japanese licence. Car No. 4 entered as Black Falcon from Rounds 1 to 3 and as Mercedes-AMG Team Black Falcon at Round 4, both under German licence. Car No. 6 entered as Black Falcon under German licence.) (Germany) Black Falcon (Germany) Mercedes-AMG Team Black Falcon	Mercedes-AMG GT3	00	(United Kingdom) Adam Christodoulou	P	4
(Japan) Goodsmile Racing & Type-Moon Racing (Germany) Black Falcon (Germany) Mercedes-AMG Team Black Falcon	Mercedes-AMG GT3	00	(Japan) Tatsuya Kataoka	P	4
(Japan) Goodsmile Racing & Type-Moon Racing (Germany) Black Falcon (Germany) Mercedes-AMG Team Black Falcon	Mercedes-AMG GT3	00	(Japan) Nobuteru Taniguchi	P	4
(Japan) Goodsmile Racing & Type-Moon Racing (Germany) Black Falcon (Germany) Mercedes-AMG Team Black Falcon	Mercedes-AMG GT3	4	(Netherlands) Yelmer Buurman	P	All
(Japan) Goodsmile Racing & Type-Moon Racing (Germany) Black Falcon (Germany) Mercedes-AMG Team Black Falcon	Mercedes-AMG GT3	4	(Germany) Maro Engel	P	All
(Japan) Goodsmile Racing & Type-Moon Racing (Germany) Black Falcon (Germany) Mercedes-AMG Team Black Falcon	Mercedes-AMG GT3	4	(Germany) Luca Stolz	P	All
(Japan) Goodsmile Racing & Type-Moon Racing (Germany) Black Falcon (Germany) Mercedes-AMG Team Black Falcon	Mercedes-AMG GT3	6	(Germany) Patrick Assenheimer	S	All
(Japan) Goodsmile Racing & Type-Moon Racing (Germany) Black Falcon (Germany) Mercedes-AMG Team Black Falcon	Mercedes-AMG GT3	6	(Germany) Hubert Haupt	S	All
(Japan) Goodsmile Racing & Type-Moon Racing (Germany) Black Falcon (Germany) Mercedes-AMG Team Black Falcon	Mercedes-AMG GT3	6	(Italy) Gabriele Piana	S	1–4
(Japan) Goodsmile Racing & Type-Moon Racing (Germany) Black Falcon (Germany) Mercedes-AMG Team Black Falcon	Mercedes-AMG GT3	6	(Saudi Arabia) Abdulaziz Al Faisal	S	4
(Japan) Goodsmile Racing & Type-Moon Racing (Germany) Black Falcon (Germany) Mercedes-AMG Team Black Falcon	Mercedes-AMG GT3	6	(Italy) David Fumanelli	S	5
(Belgium) / Audi Sport Team WRT (Note: Car No. 1 entered as Audi Sport Team WRT, car No. 2 entered as Belgian Audi Club Team WRT from Rounds 1 to 3 and as Audi Sport Team WRT at Round 4, car No. 10 entered as Belgian Audi Club Team WRT and car No. 17 entered as Belgian Audi Club Team WRT at Round 1 and as Team WRT from Round 2 on.); (Belgium) / Belgian Audi Club Team WRT; (Belgium) / Team WRT	Audi R8 LMS Evo	1	(Netherlands) Robin Frijns	P	4
(Belgium) / Audi Sport Team WRT; (Belgium) / Belgian Audi Club Team WRT; (Belgium) / Team WRT	Audi R8 LMS Evo	1	(Switzerland) Nico Müller	P	4
(Belgium) / Audi Sport Team WRT; (Belgium) / Belgian Audi Club Team WRT; (Belgium) / Team WRT	Audi R8 LMS Evo	1	(Germany) René Rast	P	4
(Belgium) / Audi Sport Team WRT; (Belgium) / Belgian Audi Club Team WRT; (Belgium) / Team WRT	Audi R8 LMS Evo	2	(Spain) Alex Riberas	P	All
(Belgium) / Audi Sport Team WRT; (Belgium) / Belgian Audi Club Team WRT; (Belgium) / Team WRT	Audi R8 LMS Evo	2	(Belgium) Dries Vanthoor	P	All
(Belgium) / Audi Sport Team WRT; (Belgium) / Belgian Audi Club Team WRT; (Belgium) / Team WRT	Audi R8 LMS Evo	2	(Argentina) Ezequiel Pérez Companc	P	1–3, 5
(Belgium) / Audi Sport Team WRT; (Belgium) / Belgian Audi Club Team WRT; (Belgium) / Team WRT	Audi R8 LMS Evo	2	(Germany) Frank Stippler	P	4
(Belgium) / Audi Sport Team WRT; (Belgium) / Belgian Audi Club Team WRT; (Belgium) / Team WRT	Audi R8 LMS Evo	10	(Netherlands) Rik Breukers	S	1–2
(Belgium) / Audi Sport Team WRT; (Belgium) / Belgian Audi Club Team WRT; (Belgium) / Team WRT	Audi R8 LMS Evo	10	(Belgium) Charles Weerts	S	1–2
(Belgium) / Audi Sport Team WRT; (Belgium) / Belgian Audi Club Team WRT; (Belgium) / Team WRT	Audi R8 LMS Evo	10	(Mexico) Ricardo Sánchez	S	1–2
(Belgium) / Audi Sport Team WRT; (Belgium) / Belgian Audi Club Team WRT; (Belgium) / Team WRT	Audi R8 LMS Evo	10	(Netherlands) Rik Breukers	P	3–5
(Belgium) / Audi Sport Team WRT; (Belgium) / Belgian Audi Club Team WRT; (Belgium) / Team WRT	Audi R8 LMS Evo	10	(France) Norman Nato	P	3–5
(Belgium) / Audi Sport Team WRT; (Belgium) / Belgian Audi Club Team WRT; (Belgium) / Team WRT	Audi R8 LMS Evo	10	(Belgium) Charles Weerts	P	3–5
(Belgium) / Audi Sport Team WRT; (Belgium) / Belgian Audi Club Team WRT; (Belgium) / Team WRT	Audi R8 LMS Evo	17	(Australia) Shae Davies	S	All
(Belgium) / Audi Sport Team WRT; (Belgium) / Belgian Audi Club Team WRT; (Belgium) / Team WRT	Audi R8 LMS Evo	17	(United Kingdom) Alex MacDowall	S	All
(Belgium) / Audi Sport Team WRT; (Belgium) / Belgian Audi Club Team WRT; (Belgium) / Team WRT	Audi R8 LMS Evo	17	(France) Paul Petit	S	1–4
(Belgium) / Audi Sport Team WRT; (Belgium) / Belgian Audi Club Team WRT; (Belgium) / Team WRT	Audi R8 LMS Evo	17	(United Kingdom) Sean Walkinshaw	S	5
(Germany) Phoenix Racing	Audi R8 LMS Evo	5	(United Kingdom) Finlay Hutchison	S	All
(Germany) Phoenix Racing	Audi R8 LMS Evo	5	(Spain) Iván Pareras	S	All
(Germany) Phoenix Racing	Audi R8 LMS Evo	5	(Germany) Kim-Luis Schramm	S	All
(Belgium) Boutsen Ginion	BMW M6 GT3	9	(Saudi Arabia) Karim Ojjeh	Am	1, 3–4
(Belgium) Boutsen Ginion	BMW M6 GT3	9	(France) Marc Rostan	Am	1, 3–4
(Belgium) Boutsen Ginion	BMW M6 GT3	9	(Belgium) Philippe Stéveny	Am	1
(Belgium) Boutsen Ginion	BMW M6 GT3	9	(Belgium) Angélique Detavernier	Am	3
(Belgium) Boutsen Ginion	BMW M6 GT3	9	(South Africa) Gennaro Bonafede	Am	4
(Belgium) Boutsen Ginion	BMW M6 GT3	9	(France) Erik Maris	Am	4
(Belgium) Boutsen Ginion	BMW M6 GT3	9	(Saudi Arabia) Karim Ojjeh	PA	2, 5
(Belgium) Boutsen Ginion	BMW M6 GT3	9	(Austria) Philipp Eng	PA	2
(Belgium) Boutsen Ginion	BMW M6 GT3	9	(France) Marc Rostan	PA	2
(Belgium) Boutsen Ginion	BMW M6 GT3	9	(South Africa) Gennaro Bonafede	PA	5
(Belgium) Boutsen Ginion	Lamborghini Huracán GT3 Evo	15	(France) Claude-Yves Gosselin	Am	1–3, 5
(Belgium) Boutsen Ginion	Lamborghini Huracán GT3 Evo	15	(Belgium) Renaud Kuppens	Am	1–3, 5
(Belgium) Boutsen Ginion	Lamborghini Huracán GT3 Evo	15	(France) Pierre Feligioni	Am	1–3
(Belgium) Boutsen Ginion	Lamborghini Huracán GT3 Evo	15	(France) Marc Rostan	Am	5
(Italy) Ombra Racing	Lamborghini Huracán GT3 Evo	12	(Italy) Stefano Gattuso	S	1–4
(Italy) Ombra Racing	Lamborghini Huracán GT3 Evo	12	(United Kingdom) Dean Stoneman	S	1–4
(Italy) Ombra Racing	Lamborghini Huracán GT3 Evo	12	(France) Romain Monti	S	1
(Italy) Ombra Racing	Lamborghini Huracán GT3 Evo	12	(Belgium) Denis Dupont	S	2–4
(Italy) Ombra Racing	Lamborghini Huracán GT3 Evo	12	(United States) Corey Lewis	S	4
(Czech Republic) Bohemia Energy racing with Scuderia Praha	Ferrari 488 GT3	14	(Czech Republic) Josef Král	PA	4
(Czech Republic) Bohemia Energy racing with Scuderia Praha	Ferrari 488 GT3	14	(Italy) Gabriele Lancieri	PA	4
(Czech Republic) Bohemia Energy racing with Scuderia Praha	Ferrari 488 GT3	14	(Italy) Matteo Malucelli	PA	4
(Czech Republic) Bohemia Energy racing with Scuderia Praha	Ferrari 488 GT3	14	(Czech Republic) Jiří Písařík	PA	4
(Hong Kong) / Modena Motorsports (Note: Car No. 16 entered as Modena Motorsports and car No. 21 entered as OpenRoad Racing.); (Hong Kong) / OpenRoad Racing	Porsche 911 GT3 R	16	(Switzerland) Mathias Beche	PA	4
(Hong Kong) / Modena Motorsports; (Hong Kong) / OpenRoad Racing	Porsche 911 GT3 R	16	(Hong Kong) Philippe Descombes	PA	4
(Hong Kong) / Modena Motorsports; (Hong Kong) / OpenRoad Racing	Porsche 911 GT3 R	16	(Hong Kong) John Shen	PA	4
(Hong Kong) / Modena Motorsports; (Hong Kong) / OpenRoad Racing	Porsche 911 GT3 R	16	(Denmark) Benny Simonsen	PA	4
(Hong Kong) / Modena Motorsports; (Hong Kong) / OpenRoad Racing	Porsche 911 GT3 R	21	(Hong Kong) Antares Au	Am	4
(Hong Kong) / Modena Motorsports; (Hong Kong) / OpenRoad Racing	Porsche 911 GT3 R	21	(Canada) Remo Ruscitti	Am	4
(Hong Kong) / Modena Motorsports; (Hong Kong) / OpenRoad Racing	Porsche 911 GT3 R	21	(Indonesia) Michael Soeryadjaya	Am	4
(Hong Kong) / Modena Motorsports; (Hong Kong) / OpenRoad Racing	Porsche 911 GT3 R	21	(Netherlands) Francis Tjia	Am	4
(Hong Kong) KCMG	Nissan GT-R Nismo GT3	18	(Switzerland) Alexandre Imperatori	P	4
(Hong Kong) KCMG	Nissan GT-R Nismo GT3	18	(United Kingdom) Oliver Jarvis	P	4
(Hong Kong) KCMG	Nissan GT-R Nismo GT3	18	(Italy) Edoardo Liberati	P	4
(Hong Kong) KCMG	Nissan GT-R Nismo GT3	35	(Australia) Josh Burdon	P	4
(Hong Kong) KCMG	Nissan GT-R Nismo GT3	35	(Japan) Katsumasa Chiyo	P	4
(Hong Kong) KCMG	Nissan GT-R Nismo GT3	35	(Japan) Tsugio Matsuda	P	4
(Austria) GRT Grasser Racing Team	Lamborghini Huracán GT3 Evo	19	(Switzerland) Lucas Mauron	S	All
(Austria) GRT Grasser Racing Team	Lamborghini Huracán GT3 Evo	19	(France) Arno Santamato	S	All
(Austria) GRT Grasser Racing Team	Lamborghini Huracán GT3 Evo	19	(Austria) Gerhard Tweraser	S	All
(Austria) GRT Grasser Racing Team	Lamborghini Huracán GT3 Evo	19	(Italy) Andrea Amici	S	4
(Austria) GRT Grasser Racing Team	Lamborghini Huracán GT3 Evo	63	(Italy) Mirko Bortolotti	P	1–4
(Austria) GRT Grasser Racing Team	Lamborghini Huracán GT3 Evo	63	(Germany) Christian Engelhart	P	1–4
(Austria) GRT Grasser Racing Team	Lamborghini Huracán GT3 Evo	63	(Switzerland) Rolf Ineichen	P	1–4
(United Arab Emirates) GPX Racing	Porsche 911 GT3 R	20	(United Kingdom) Benjamin Goethe	S	1–3, 5
(United Arab Emirates) GPX Racing	Porsche 911 GT3 R	20	(South Africa) Jordan Grogor	S	1–3, 5
(United Arab Emirates) GPX Racing	Porsche 911 GT3 R	20	(United Kingdom) Stuart Hall	S	1–3, 5
(United Arab Emirates) GPX Racing	Porsche 911 GT3 R	20	(Denmark) Michael Christensen	P	4
(United Arab Emirates) GPX Racing	Porsche 911 GT3 R	20	(France) Kévin Estre	P	4
(United Arab Emirates) GPX Racing	Porsche 911 GT3 R	20	(Austria) Richard Lietz	P	4
(United Kingdom) Jenson Team Rocket RJN	Honda NSX GT3	22	(Switzerland) Philipp Frommenwiler	S	All
(United Kingdom) Jenson Team Rocket RJN	Honda NSX GT3	22	(United States) Matt McMurry	S	All
(United Kingdom) Jenson Team Rocket RJN	Honda NSX GT3	22	(United Kingdom) Struan Moore	S	1–2, 4
(United Kingdom) Jenson Team Rocket RJN	Honda NSX GT3	22	(United Kingdom) Ryan Ratcliffe	S	3
(United Kingdom) Jenson Team Rocket RJN	Honda NSX GT3	22	(Mexico) Ricardo Sánchez	S	4–5
(France) Tech 1 Racing	Lexus RC F GT3	23	(France) Fabien Barthez	Am	All
(France) Tech 1 Racing	Lexus RC F GT3	23	(Belgium) Bernard Delhez	Am	All
(France) Tech 1 Racing	Lexus RC F GT3	23	(France) Éric Cayrolle	Am	3–4
(France) Tech 1 Racing	Lexus RC F GT3	23	(France) Timothé Buret	Am	4
(France) Tech 1 Racing	Lexus RC F GT3	23	(France) Eric Debard	Am	5
(France) / Saintéloc Racing (Note: Car No. 25 entered as Saintéloc Racing from Rounds 1 to 3 and as Audi Sport Team Saintéloc at Round 4 and car No. 26 entered as Saintéloc Racing.); (France) / Audi Sport Team Saintéloc	Audi R8 LMS Evo	25	(Germany) Christopher Haase	P	1–5
(France) / Saintéloc Racing; (France) / Audi Sport Team Saintéloc	Audi R8 LMS Evo	25	(France) Simon Gachet	P	1–3, 5
(France) / Saintéloc Racing; (France) / Audi Sport Team Saintéloc	Audi R8 LMS Evo	25	(France) Steven Palette	P	1–3
(France) / Saintéloc Racing; (France) / Audi Sport Team Saintéloc	Audi R8 LMS Evo	25	(Belgium) Frédéric Vervisch	P	4
(France) / Saintéloc Racing; (France) / Audi Sport Team Saintéloc	Audi R8 LMS Evo	25	(Germany) Markus Winkelhock	P	4
(France) / Saintéloc Racing; (France) / Audi Sport Team Saintéloc	Audi R8 LMS Evo	25	(France) Dorian Boccolacci	P	5
(France) / Saintéloc Racing; (France) / Audi Sport Team Saintéloc	Audi R8 LMS Evo	26	(Germany) Markus Winkelhock	PA	1–3
(France) / Saintéloc Racing; (France) / Audi Sport Team Saintéloc	Audi R8 LMS Evo	26	(France) Fabien Michal	PA	1–2
(France) / Saintéloc Racing; (France) / Audi Sport Team Saintéloc	Audi R8 LMS Evo	26	(Belgium) Pierre-Yves Paque (Note: Pierre-Yves Paque entered under Belgian licence at Rounds 1 and 4 and under French licence at Round 3.)	PA	1, 3–5
(France) / Saintéloc Racing; (France) / Audi Sport Team Saintéloc	Audi R8 LMS Evo	26	(France) Nyls Stievenart	PA	2
(France) / Saintéloc Racing; (France) / Audi Sport Team Saintéloc	Audi R8 LMS Evo	26	(France) Philippe Chatelet	PA	3
(France) / Saintéloc Racing; (France) / Audi Sport Team Saintéloc	Audi R8 LMS Evo	26	(France) Michael Blanchemain	PA	4
(France) / Saintéloc Racing; (France) / Audi Sport Team Saintéloc	Audi R8 LMS Evo	26	(France) Simon Gachet	PA	4
(France) / Saintéloc Racing; (France) / Audi Sport Team Saintéloc	Audi R8 LMS Evo	26	(France) Steven Palette	PA	4
(France) / Saintéloc Racing; (France) / Audi Sport Team Saintéloc	Audi R8 LMS Evo	26	(France) Edouard Cauhaupé	PA	5
(France) / Saintéloc Racing; (France) / Audi Sport Team Saintéloc	Audi R8 LMS Evo	26	(France) Pierre-Alexandre Jean	PA	5
(Italy) Daiko Lazarus Racing (Note: The Am Cup-entered Daiko Lazarus Racing car was renumbered from 28 to 27, after the Silver Cup-entered car withdrew from Round 4.)	Lamborghini Huracán GT3	27	(Italy) Fabrizio Crestani	S	1–3
(Italy) Daiko Lazarus Racing	Lamborghini Huracán GT3	27	(Germany) Nicolas Pohler	S	1–3
(Italy) Daiko Lazarus Racing	Lamborghini Huracán GT3	27	(Switzerland) Kris Richard	S	1–3
(Italy) Daiko Lazarus Racing	Lamborghini Huracán GT3	27	(United Kingdom) Graham Davidson	Am	4
(Italy) Daiko Lazarus Racing	Lamborghini Huracán GT3	27	(France) Sylvain Debs	Am	4
(Italy) Daiko Lazarus Racing	Lamborghini Huracán GT3	27	(Spain) Fernando Navarrete	Am	4
(Italy) Daiko Lazarus Racing	Lamborghini Huracán GT3	27	(United Kingdom) Immanuel Vinke	Am	4
(Italy) Daiko Lazarus Racing	Lamborghini Huracán GT3	27	(Argentina) José Manuel Balbiani	Am	5
(Italy) Daiko Lazarus Racing	Lamborghini Huracán GT3	27	(Poland) Andrzej Lewandowski	Am	5
(Italy) Daiko Lazarus Racing	Lamborghini Huracán GT3	27	(United States) August MacBeth	Am	5
(Italy) Raton Racing by Target	Lamborghini Huracán GT3 Evo	29	(Italy) Stefano Costantini	Am	All
(Italy) Raton Racing by Target	Lamborghini Huracán GT3 Evo	29	(Spain) Toni Forné	Am	All
(Italy) Raton Racing by Target	Lamborghini Huracán GT3 Evo	29	(Switzerland) Christoph Lenz	Am	All
(Italy) Raton Racing by Target	Lamborghini Huracán GT3 Evo	29	(Italy) Alberto Di Folco	Am	4
(Italy) Raton Racing by Target	Lamborghini Huracán GT3 Evo	311	(Germany) Jens Liebhauser	Am	5
(Italy) Raton Racing by Target	Lamborghini Huracán GT3 Evo	311	(Germany) Florian Scholze	Am	5
(Italy) Raton Racing by Target	Lamborghini Huracán GT3 Evo	311	(Germany) Wolfgang Triller	Am	5
(Italy) Honda Team Motul	Honda NSX GT3	30	(Belgium) Bertrand Baguette	P	4
(Italy) Honda Team Motul	Honda NSX GT3	30	(Germany) Mario Farnbacher	P	4
(Italy) Honda Team Motul	Honda NSX GT3	30	(Netherlands) Renger van der Zande	P	4
(United Kingdom) Team Parker Racing	Bentley Continental GT3	31	(United Kingdom) Derek Pierce	PA	All
(United Kingdom) Team Parker Racing	Bentley Continental GT3	31	(United Kingdom) Seb Morris	PA	1–3, 5
(United Kingdom) Team Parker Racing	Bentley Continental GT3	31	(United Kingdom) Rob Smith	PA	1–3
(United Kingdom) Team Parker Racing	Bentley Continental GT3	31	(United Kingdom) Glynn Geddie	PA	4
(United Kingdom) Team Parker Racing	Bentley Continental GT3	31	(United Kingdom) Andy Meyrick	PA	4
(United Kingdom) Team Parker Racing	Bentley Continental GT3	31	(United Kingdom) Ryan Ratcliffe	PA	4
(Germany) Rinaldi Racing	Ferrari 488 GT3	33	(Germany) Christian Hook	Am	All
(Germany) Rinaldi Racing	Ferrari 488 GT3	33	(Germany) Manuel Lauck	Am	All
(Germany) Rinaldi Racing	Ferrari 488 GT3	33	(Germany) Steve Parrow	Am	1–3, 5
(Germany) Rinaldi Racing	Ferrari 488 GT3	33	(Germany) Alexander Mattschull	Am	4
(Germany) Rinaldi Racing	Ferrari 488 GT3	33	(Germany) Hendrik Still	Am	4
(Germany) Rinaldi Racing	Ferrari 488 GT3	333	(Russia) Denis Bulatov	S	All
(Germany) Rinaldi Racing	Ferrari 488 GT3	333	(South Africa) David Perel	S	All
(Germany) Rinaldi Racing	Ferrari 488 GT3	333	(Russia) Rinat Salikhov	S	All
(Germany) Rinaldi Racing	Ferrari 488 GT3	333	(Netherlands) Indy Dontje	S	4
(Germany) Rinaldi Racing	Ferrari 488 GT3	488	(Australia) Martin Berry	Am	All
(Germany) Rinaldi Racing	Ferrari 488 GT3	488	(Germany) Pierre Ehret	Am	All
(Germany) Rinaldi Racing	Ferrari 488 GT3	488	(Argentina) José Manuel Balbiani	Am	1–4
(Germany) Rinaldi Racing	Ferrari 488 GT3	488	(Finland) Rory Penttinen	Am	4–5
(Germany) Walkenhorst Motorsport	BMW M6 GT3	34	(Netherlands) Nick Catsburg	P	4
(Germany) Walkenhorst Motorsport	BMW M6 GT3	34	(Denmark) Mikkel Jensen	P	4
(Germany) Walkenhorst Motorsport	BMW M6 GT3	34	(Norway) Christian Krognes	P	4
(Germany) Walkenhorst Motorsport	BMW M6 GT3	36	(Norway) Anders Buchardt	Am	4
(Germany) Walkenhorst Motorsport	BMW M6 GT3	36	(United Kingdom) David Pittard	Am	4
(Germany) Walkenhorst Motorsport	BMW M6 GT3	36	(Germany) Henry Walkenhorst	Am	4
(Germany) Walkenhorst Motorsport	BMW M6 GT3	36	(United States) Don Yount	Am	4
(France) 3Y Technology	BMW M6 GT3	37	(France) Philippe Bourgeois	Am	4
(France) 3Y Technology	BMW M6 GT3	37	(France) Jean-Paul Buffin	Am	4
(France) 3Y Technology	BMW M6 GT3	37	(France) Philippe Haezebrouck	Am	4
(France) 3Y Technology	BMW M6 GT3	37	(France) Gilles Vannelet	Am	4
(Germany) BMW Team Schnitzer	BMW M6 GT3	42	(United States) John Edwards	P	4
(Germany) BMW Team Schnitzer	BMW M6 GT3	42	(Brazil) Augusto Farfus	P	4
(Germany) BMW Team Schnitzer	BMW M6 GT3	42	(Germany) Martin Tomczyk	P	4
(United Kingdom) / Strakka Racing (Note: Car No. 43 entered as Strakka Racing and car No. 44 entered as Mercedes-AMG Team Strakka Racing.); (United Kingdom) / Mercedes-AMG Team Strakka Racing	Mercedes-AMG GT3	43	(United States) Dev Gore	P	1–3
(United Kingdom) / Strakka Racing; (United Kingdom) / Mercedes-AMG Team Strakka Racing	Mercedes-AMG GT3	43	(United Kingdom) Lewis Williamson	P	1–3
(United Kingdom) / Strakka Racing; (United Kingdom) / Mercedes-AMG Team Strakka Racing	Mercedes-AMG GT3	43	(United Kingdom) Jack Hawksworth	P	1–2
(United Kingdom) / Strakka Racing; (United Kingdom) / Mercedes-AMG Team Strakka Racing	Mercedes-AMG GT3	43	(Italy) David Fumanelli	P	3
(United Kingdom) / Strakka Racing; (United Kingdom) / Mercedes-AMG Team Strakka Racing	Mercedes-AMG GT3	43	(Italy) David Fumanelli	PA	4
(United Kingdom) / Strakka Racing; (United Kingdom) / Mercedes-AMG Team Strakka Racing	Mercedes-AMG GT3	43	(United Kingdom) Jack Hawksworth	PA	4
(United Kingdom) / Strakka Racing; (United Kingdom) / Mercedes-AMG Team Strakka Racing	Mercedes-AMG GT3	43	(United States) Richard Heistand	PA	4
(United Kingdom) / Strakka Racing; (United Kingdom) / Mercedes-AMG Team Strakka Racing	Mercedes-AMG GT3	43	(Denmark) Christina Nielsen	PA	4
(United Kingdom) / Strakka Racing; (United Kingdom) / Mercedes-AMG Team Strakka Racing	Mercedes-AMG GT3	43	(Netherlands) Max Koebolt	S	5
(United Kingdom) / Strakka Racing; (United Kingdom) / Mercedes-AMG Team Strakka Racing	Mercedes-AMG GT3	43	(France) Romain Monti	S	5
(United Kingdom) / Strakka Racing; (United Kingdom) / Mercedes-AMG Team Strakka Racing	Mercedes-AMG GT3	43	(Belgium) Esteban Muth	S	5
(United Kingdom) / Strakka Racing; (United Kingdom) / Mercedes-AMG Team Strakka Racing	Mercedes-AMG GT3	44	(United Kingdom) Gary Paffett	P	4
(United Kingdom) / Strakka Racing; (United Kingdom) / Mercedes-AMG Team Strakka Racing	Mercedes-AMG GT3	44	(France) Tristan Vautier	P	4
(United Kingdom) / Strakka Racing; (United Kingdom) / Mercedes-AMG Team Strakka Racing	Mercedes-AMG GT3	44	(United Kingdom) Lewis Williamson	P	4
(Belgium) 1969 Tribute	Porsche 911 GT3 Cup MR	50	(Belgium) Loïc Deman	PA; INV	4
(Belgium) 1969 Tribute	Porsche 911 GT3 Cup MR	50	(Belgium) Angélique Detavernier	PA; INV	4
(Belgium) 1969 Tribute	Porsche 911 GT3 Cup MR	50	(Belgium) Marc Duez	PA; INV	4
(Belgium) 1969 Tribute	Porsche 911 GT3 Cup MR	50	(Belgium) Stéphane Lémeret	PA; INV	4
(Italy) AF Corse (Note: Car No. 51 entered as AF Corse under Italian licence and scored points towards the Russian SMP Racing team. Car No. 52 entered as AF Corse under Italian licence. Car No. 72 entered as SMP Racing under Russian licence. Car No. 93 entered as Tempesta Racing under British licence and scored points towards the Italian AF Corse team.) (Russia) SMP Racing (United Kingdom) Tempesta Racing	Ferrari 488 GT3	51	(United Kingdom) Sam Bird	P	4
(Italy) AF Corse (Russia) SMP Racing (United Kingdom) Tempesta Racing	Ferrari 488 GT3	51	(United Kingdom) James Calado	P	4
(Italy) AF Corse (Russia) SMP Racing (United Kingdom) Tempesta Racing	Ferrari 488 GT3	51	(Italy) Alessandro Pier Guidi	P	4
(Italy) AF Corse (Russia) SMP Racing (United Kingdom) Tempesta Racing	Ferrari 488 GT3	52	(Italy) Andrea Bertolini	PA	All
(Italy) AF Corse (Russia) SMP Racing (United Kingdom) Tempesta Racing	Ferrari 488 GT3	52	(Netherlands) Niek Hommerson	PA	All
(Italy) AF Corse (Russia) SMP Racing (United Kingdom) Tempesta Racing	Ferrari 488 GT3	52	(Belgium) Louis Machiels	PA	All
(Italy) AF Corse (Russia) SMP Racing (United Kingdom) Tempesta Racing	Ferrari 488 GT3	52	(Finland) Toni Vilander	PA	4
(Italy) AF Corse (Russia) SMP Racing (United Kingdom) Tempesta Racing	Ferrari 488 GT3	72	(Russia) Mikhail Aleshin	P	All
(Italy) AF Corse (Russia) SMP Racing (United Kingdom) Tempesta Racing	Ferrari 488 GT3	72	(Spain) Miguel Molina	P	All
(Italy) AF Corse (Russia) SMP Racing (United Kingdom) Tempesta Racing	Ferrari 488 GT3	72	(Italy) Davide Rigon	P	All
(Italy) AF Corse (Russia) SMP Racing (United Kingdom) Tempesta Racing	Ferrari 488 GT3	93	(United Kingdom) Chris Froggatt	PA	All
(Italy) AF Corse (Russia) SMP Racing (United Kingdom) Tempesta Racing	Ferrari 488 GT3	93	(Hong Kong) Jonathan Hui	PA	All
(Italy) AF Corse (Russia) SMP Racing (United Kingdom) Tempesta Racing	Ferrari 488 GT3	93	(United Kingdom) Chris Buncombe	PA	1–3, 5
(Italy) AF Corse (Russia) SMP Racing (United Kingdom) Tempesta Racing	Ferrari 488 GT3	93	(Italy) Edward Cheever	PA	4
(Italy) AF Corse (Russia) SMP Racing (United Kingdom) Tempesta Racing	Ferrari 488 GT3	93	(Italy) Giancarlo Fisichella	PA	4
(Italy) Dinamic Motorsport	Porsche 911 GT3 R	54	(Kuwait) Zaid Ashkanani	P	All
(Italy) Dinamic Motorsport	Porsche 911 GT3 R	54	(Italy) Andrea Rizzoli	P	All
(Italy) Dinamic Motorsport	Porsche 911 GT3 R	54	(Austria) Klaus Bachler	P	1–4
(Italy) Dinamic Motorsport	Porsche 911 GT3 R	54	(Germany) Marco Seefried	P	5
(Germany) Attempto Racing	Audi R8 LMS Evo	55	(Italy) Mattia Drudi	S	All
(Germany) Attempto Racing	Audi R8 LMS Evo	55	(Netherlands) Pieter Schothorst	S	All
(Germany) Attempto Racing	Audi R8 LMS Evo	55	(Netherlands) Steijn Schothorst	S	All
(Germany) Attempto Racing	Audi R8 LMS Evo	66	(Austria) Clemens Schmid	P	All
(Germany) Attempto Racing	Audi R8 LMS Evo	66	(South Africa) Kelvin van der Linde	P	1–4
(Germany) Attempto Racing	Audi R8 LMS Evo	66	(Australia) Nick Foster	P	1–3, 5
(Germany) Attempto Racing	Audi R8 LMS Evo	66	(Netherlands) Milan Dontje	P	4
(Germany) Attempto Racing	Audi R8 LMS Evo	66	(France) Valentin Hasse-Clot	P	5
(United Kingdom) Garage 59	Aston Martin Vantage AMR GT3	59	(United Kingdom) Jonny Adam	P	All
(United Kingdom) Garage 59	Aston Martin Vantage AMR GT3	59	(France) Côme Ledogar	P	All
(United Kingdom) Garage 59	Aston Martin Vantage AMR GT3	59	(United Kingdom) Andrew Watson	P	All
(United Kingdom) Garage 59	Aston Martin Vantage AMR GT3	188	(United Kingdom) Chris Goodwin	Am	All
(United Kingdom) Garage 59	Aston Martin Vantage AMR GT3	188	(Sweden) Alexander West	Am	All
(United Kingdom) Garage 59	Aston Martin Vantage AMR GT3	188	(United Kingdom) Chris Harris	Am	2–5
(United Kingdom) Garage 59	Aston Martin Vantage AMR GT3	188	(United Kingdom) Ross Gunn	Am	4
(Switzerland) R-Motorsport	Aston Martin Vantage AMR GT3	62	(Belgium) Maxime Martin	P	All
(Switzerland) R-Motorsport	Aston Martin Vantage AMR GT3	62	(United Kingdom) Matt Parry	P	All
(Switzerland) R-Motorsport	Aston Martin Vantage AMR GT3	62	(France) Matthieu Vaxivière	P	All
(Switzerland) R-Motorsport	Aston Martin Vantage AMR GT3	76	(United Kingdom) Jake Dennis	P	All
(Switzerland) R-Motorsport	Aston Martin Vantage AMR GT3	76	(Germany) Marvin Kirchhöfer	P	All
(Switzerland) R-Motorsport	Aston Martin Vantage AMR GT3	76	(Denmark) Nicki Thiim	P	1–2
(Switzerland) R-Motorsport	Aston Martin Vantage AMR GT3	76	(United Kingdom) Alex Lynn	P	3–5
(Switzerland) R-Motorsport	Aston Martin Vantage AMR GT3	762	(United Kingdom) Ricky Collard	S	4
(Switzerland) R-Motorsport	Aston Martin Vantage AMR GT3	762	(Austria) Ferdinand Habsburg	S	4
(Switzerland) R-Motorsport	Aston Martin Vantage AMR GT3	762	(Switzerland) Hugo de Sadeleer	S	4
(Switzerland) R-Motorsport	Aston Martin Vantage AMR GT3	762	(Finland) Aaro Vainio	S	4
(United Kingdom) Ram Racing	Mercedes-AMG GT3	74	(United Kingdom) Tom Onslow-Cole	PA	All
(United Kingdom) Ram Racing	Mercedes-AMG GT3	74	(Netherlands) Remon Vos	PA	All
(United Kingdom) Ram Racing	Mercedes-AMG GT3	74	(United Kingdom) Darren Burke	PA	3–4
(United Kingdom) Ram Racing	Mercedes-AMG GT3	74	(Netherlands) Christiaan Frankenhout	PA	4
(United Kingdom) Barwell Motorsport	Lamborghini Huracán GT3 Evo	77	(Switzerland) Adrian Amstutz	Am	All
(United Kingdom) Barwell Motorsport	Lamborghini Huracán GT3 Evo	77	(Russia) Leo Machitski	Am	All
(United Kingdom) Barwell Motorsport	Lamborghini Huracán GT3 Evo	77	(Portugal) Miguel Ramos	Am	1–3, 5
(United Kingdom) Barwell Motorsport	Lamborghini Huracán GT3 Evo	77	(United Kingdom) Richard Abra	Am	4
(United Kingdom) Barwell Motorsport	Lamborghini Huracán GT3 Evo	77	(Finland) Patrick Kujala	Am	4
(United Kingdom) Barwell Motorsport	Lamborghini Huracán GT3 Evo	78	(United Kingdom) Sandy Mitchell	S	All
(United Kingdom) Barwell Motorsport	Lamborghini Huracán GT3 Evo	78	(United Kingdom) James Pull	S	All
(United Kingdom) Barwell Motorsport	Lamborghini Huracán GT3 Evo	78	(United Kingdom) Jordan Witt	S	All
(China) Audi Sport R8 LMS Cup	Audi R8 LMS Evo	80	(Indonesia) Andrew Haryanto	Am	4
(China) Audi Sport R8 LMS Cup	Audi R8 LMS Evo	80	(Taiwan) Jeffrey Lee	Am	4
(China) Audi Sport R8 LMS Cup	Audi R8 LMS Evo	80	(Australia) Yasser Shahin	Am	4
(China) Audi Sport R8 LMS Cup	Audi R8 LMS Evo	80	(China) Jingzu Sun	Am	4
(France) / AKKA ASP Team (Note: Cars No. 87 and 90 entered as AKKA ASP Team and car No. 88 entered as Mercedes-AMG Team AKKA ASP.); (France) / Mercedes-AMG Team AKKA ASP	Mercedes-AMG GT3	87	(France) Jean-Luc Beaubelique	PA	1–3, 5
(France) / AKKA ASP Team; (France) / Mercedes-AMG Team AKKA ASP	Mercedes-AMG GT3	87	(France) Jim Pla	PA	1–3, 5
(France) / AKKA ASP Team; (France) / Mercedes-AMG Team AKKA ASP	Mercedes-AMG GT3	87	(Italy) Mauro Ricci	PA	1–3, 5
(France) / AKKA ASP Team; (France) / Mercedes-AMG Team AKKA ASP	Mercedes-AMG GT3	88	(Monaco) Vincent Abril	P	All
(France) / AKKA ASP Team; (France) / Mercedes-AMG Team AKKA ASP	Mercedes-AMG GT3	88	(Italy) Raffaele Marciello	P	All
(France) / AKKA ASP Team; (France) / Mercedes-AMG Team AKKA ASP	Mercedes-AMG GT3	88	(United Kingdom) Michael Meadows	P	1–3, 5
(France) / AKKA ASP Team; (France) / Mercedes-AMG Team AKKA ASP	Mercedes-AMG GT3	88	(Germany) Fabian Schiller	P	4
(France) / AKKA ASP Team; (France) / Mercedes-AMG Team AKKA ASP	Mercedes-AMG GT3	90	(Germany) Nico Bastian	S	All
(France) / AKKA ASP Team; (France) / Mercedes-AMG Team AKKA ASP	Mercedes-AMG GT3	90	(Russia) Timur Boguslavskiy	S	All
(France) / AKKA ASP Team; (France) / Mercedes-AMG Team AKKA ASP	Mercedes-AMG GT3	90	(Brazil) Felipe Fraga	S	All
(Germany) Herberth Motorsport	Porsche 911 GT3 R	91	(Switzerland) Daniel Allemann	PA	4
(Germany) Herberth Motorsport	Porsche 911 GT3 R	91	(Germany) Ralf Bohn	PA	4
(Germany) Herberth Motorsport	Porsche 911 GT3 R	91	(Germany) Alfred Renauer	PA	4
(Germany) Herberth Motorsport	Porsche 911 GT3 R	91	(Germany) Robert Renauer	PA	4
Oman Racing with TF Sport	Aston Martin Vantage AMR GT3	97	(Republic of Ireland) Charlie Eastwood	PA	All
Oman Racing with TF Sport	Aston Martin Vantage AMR GT3	97	(Oman) Ahmad Al Harthy	PA	All
Oman Racing with TF Sport	Aston Martin Vantage AMR GT3	97	(Turkey) Salih Yoluç	PA	All
Oman Racing with TF Sport	Aston Martin Vantage AMR GT3	97	(Denmark) Nicki Thiim	PA	4
(Germany) Rowe Racing	Porsche 911 GT3 R	98	(France) Romain Dumas	P	All
(Germany) Rowe Racing	Porsche 911 GT3 R	98	(France) Mathieu Jaminet	P	All
(Germany) Rowe Racing	Porsche 911 GT3 R	98	(Germany) Sven Müller	P	All
(Germany) Rowe Racing	Porsche 911 GT3 R	99	(Australia) Matt Campbell	P	All
(Germany) Rowe Racing	Porsche 911 GT3 R	99	(Norway) Dennis Olsen	P	All
(Germany) Rowe Racing	Porsche 911 GT3 R	99	(Germany) Dirk Werner	P	All
(Germany) Rowe Racing	Porsche 911 GT3 R	998	(France) Frédéric Makowiecki	P	4
(Germany) Rowe Racing	Porsche 911 GT3 R	998	(France) Patrick Pilet	P	4
(Germany) Rowe Racing	Porsche 911 GT3 R	998	(United Kingdom) Nick Tandy	P	4
(United Kingdom) / Bentley Team M-Sport (Note: Cars No. 107 and 108 entered as Bentley Team M-Sport and cars No. 109 and 110 entered as M-Sport Team Bentley.); (United Kingdom) / M-Sport Team Bentley	Bentley Continental GT3	107	(France) Jules Gounon	P	All
(United Kingdom) / Bentley Team M-Sport; (United Kingdom) / M-Sport Team Bentley	Bentley Continental GT3	107	(United Kingdom) Steven Kane	P	All
(United Kingdom) / Bentley Team M-Sport; (United Kingdom) / M-Sport Team Bentley	Bentley Continental GT3	107	(South Africa) Jordan Pepper	P	All
(United Kingdom) / Bentley Team M-Sport; (United Kingdom) / M-Sport Team Bentley	Bentley Continental GT3	108	(Belgium) Maxime Soulet	P	All
(United Kingdom) / Bentley Team M-Sport; (United Kingdom) / M-Sport Team Bentley	Bentley Continental GT3	108	(Spain) Andy Soucek	P	1–3, 5
(United Kingdom) / Bentley Team M-Sport; (United Kingdom) / M-Sport Team Bentley	Bentley Continental GT3	108	(United Kingdom) Alex Buncombe	P	1–2, 4
(United Kingdom) / Bentley Team M-Sport; (United Kingdom) / M-Sport Team Bentley	Bentley Continental GT3	108	(United Kingdom) Callum MacLeod	P	3, 5
(United Kingdom) / Bentley Team M-Sport; (United Kingdom) / M-Sport Team Bentley	Bentley Continental GT3	108	(Finland) Markus Palttala	P	4
(United Kingdom) / Bentley Team M-Sport; (United Kingdom) / M-Sport Team Bentley	Bentley Continental GT3	109	(Brazil) Rodrigo Baptista	P	4
(United Kingdom) / Bentley Team M-Sport; (United Kingdom) / M-Sport Team Bentley	Bentley Continental GT3	109	(United Kingdom) Callum MacLeod	P	4
(United Kingdom) / Bentley Team M-Sport; (United Kingdom) / M-Sport Team Bentley	Bentley Continental GT3	109	(United Kingdom) Seb Morris	P	4
(United Kingdom) / Bentley Team M-Sport; (United Kingdom) / M-Sport Team Bentley	Bentley Continental GT3	110	(Brazil) Pipo Derani	P	4
(United Kingdom) / Bentley Team M-Sport; (United Kingdom) / M-Sport Team Bentley	Bentley Continental GT3	110	(Spain) Lucas Ordóñez	P	4
(United Kingdom) / Bentley Team M-Sport; (United Kingdom) / M-Sport Team Bentley	Bentley Continental GT3	110	(Spain) Andy Soucek	P	4
(Italy) Antonelli Motorsport	Mercedes-AMG GT3	111	(Italy) Marco Antonelli	Am	1
(Italy) Antonelli Motorsport	Mercedes-AMG GT3	111	(Italy) Giuseppe Cipriani	Am	1
(Italy) Antonelli Motorsport	Mercedes-AMG GT3	111	(Italy) Davide Roda	Am	1
(Germany) KÜS Team75 Bernhard	Porsche 911 GT3 R	117	(New Zealand) Earl Bamber	P	4
(Germany) KÜS Team75 Bernhard	Porsche 911 GT3 R	117	(Germany) Timo Bernhard	P	4
(Germany) KÜS Team75 Bernhard	Porsche 911 GT3 R	117	(Belgium) Laurens Vanthoor	P	4
(Germany) Montaplast by Land Motorsport	Audi R8 LMS Evo	129	(Switzerland) Ricardo Feller	P	4
(Germany) Montaplast by Land Motorsport	Audi R8 LMS Evo	129	(United Kingdom) Jamie Green	P	4
(Germany) Montaplast by Land Motorsport	Audi R8 LMS Evo	129	(Germany) Christopher Mies	P	4
(Italy) Scuderia Villorba Corse	Mercedes-AMG GT3	133	(Switzerland) Mauro Calamia	S	3
(Italy) Scuderia Villorba Corse	Mercedes-AMG GT3	133	(Switzerland) Stefano Monaco	S	3
(Italy) Scuderia Villorba Corse	Mercedes-AMG GT3	133	(Switzerland) Roberto Pampanini	S	3
(Italy) Scuderia Villorba Corse	Mercedes-AMG GT3	133	(Switzerland) Mauro Calamia	PA	4
(Italy) Scuderia Villorba Corse	Mercedes-AMG GT3	133	(Switzerland) Ivan Jacoma	PA	4
(Italy) Scuderia Villorba Corse	Mercedes-AMG GT3	133	(Switzerland) Stefano Monaco	PA	4
(Italy) Scuderia Villorba Corse	Mercedes-AMG GT3	133	(Switzerland) Roberto Pampanini	PA	4
(Taiwan) HubAuto Corsa	Ferrari 488 GT3	227	(New Zealand) Nick Cassidy	P	4
(Taiwan) HubAuto Corsa	Ferrari 488 GT3	227	(Australia) Nick Foster	P	4
(Taiwan) HubAuto Corsa	Ferrari 488 GT3	227	(Brazil) Daniel Serra	P	4
(Austria) HB Racing	Ferrari 488 GT3	444	(Austria) Jens Liebhauser (Note: Jens Liebhauser entered under Austrian licence at Rounds 1 and 4 and under German licence at Rounds 2 and 3.)	Am	1–4
(Austria) HB Racing	Ferrari 488 GT3	444	(Germany) Florian Scholze	Am	1–4
(Austria) HB Racing	Ferrari 488 GT3	444	(Poland) Andrzej Lewandowski	Am	1–2
(Austria) HB Racing	Ferrari 488 GT3	444	(Germany) Wolfgang Triller	Am	3
(Austria) HB Racing	Ferrari 488 GT3	444	(France) Thomas Neubauer	Am	4
(Austria) HB Racing	Ferrari 488 GT3	444	(Germany) Philipp Wlazik	Am	4
(China) Orange1 FFF Racing Team	Lamborghini Huracán GT3 Evo	519	(United Kingdom) Phil Keen	P	All
(China) Orange1 FFF Racing Team	Lamborghini Huracán GT3 Evo	519	(Italy) Giovanni Venturini	P	All
(China) Orange1 FFF Racing Team	Lamborghini Huracán GT3 Evo	519	(France) Franck Perera	P	1–4
(China) Orange1 FFF Racing Team	Lamborghini Huracán GT3 Evo	519	(Italy) Giacomo Altoè	P	5
(China) Orange1 FFF Racing Team	Lamborghini Huracán GT3 Evo	555	(Italy) Michele Beretta	S	All
(China) Orange1 FFF Racing Team	Lamborghini Huracán GT3 Evo	555	(United States) Taylor Proto	S	All
(China) Orange1 FFF Racing Team	Lamborghini Huracán GT3 Evo	555	(Mexico) Diego Menchaca	S	1–4
(China) Orange1 FFF Racing Team	Lamborghini Huracán GT3 Evo	555	(Italy) Giacomo Altoè	S	4
(China) Orange1 FFF Racing Team	Lamborghini Huracán GT3 Evo	555	(Italy) Andrea Amici	S	5
(China) Orange1 FFF Racing Team	Lamborghini Huracán GT3 Evo	563	(Italy) Andrea Caldarelli	P	All
(China) Orange1 FFF Racing Team	Lamborghini Huracán GT3 Evo	563	(Italy) Marco Mapelli	P	All
(China) Orange1 FFF Racing Team	Lamborghini Huracán GT3 Evo	563	(Denmark) Dennis Lind	P	1–4
(China) Orange1 FFF Racing Team	Lamborghini Huracán GT3 Evo	563	(Spain) Albert Costa	P	5
(Hong Kong) Mercedes-AMG Team GruppeM Racing	Mercedes-AMG GT3	999	(Austria) Lucas Auer	P	4
(Hong Kong) Mercedes-AMG Team GruppeM Racing	Mercedes-AMG GT3	999	(Germany) Maximilian Buhk	P	4
(Hong Kong) Mercedes-AMG Team GruppeM Racing	Mercedes-AMG GT3	999	(Germany) Maximilian Götz	P	4

Icon	Class
P	Pro Cup
S	Silver Cup
PA	Pro-Am Cup
Am	Am Cup
INV	Invitational

== Race results ==
Bold indicates overall winner.

Round	Circuit	Pole position	Pro Winners	Silver Winners	Pro-Am Winners	Am Winners
1	(Italy) Monza	(Austria) No. 63 GRT Grasser Racing Team	**(Italy) No. 54 Dinamic Motorsport**	(France) No. 90 AKKA ASP Team	(United Kingdom) No. 93 Tempesta Racing	(United Kingdom) No. 77 Barwell Motorsport
1	(Italy) Monza	(Italy) Mirko Bortolotti (Germany) Christian Engelhart (Switzerland) Rolf Ineichen	**(Kuwait) Zaid Ashkanani** **(Austria) Klaus Bachler** **(Italy) Andrea Rizzoli**	(Germany) Nico Bastian (Russia) Timur Boguslavskiy (Brazil) Felipe Fraga	(United Kingdom) Chris Buncombe (United Kingdom) Chris Froggatt (Hong Kong) Jonathan Hui	(Switzerland) Adrian Amstutz (Russia) Leo Machitski (Portugal) Miguel Ramos
2	(United Kingdom) Silverstone	(Austria) No. 63 GRT Grasser Racing Team	**(Russia) No. 72 SMP Racing**	(Austria) No. 19 GRT Grasser Racing Team	(Italy) No. 52 AF Corse	(United Kingdom) No. 77 Barwell Motorsport
2	(United Kingdom) Silverstone	(Italy) Mirko Bortolotti (Germany) Christian Engelhart (Switzerland) Rolf Ineichen	**(Russia) Mikhail Aleshin** **(Spain) Miguel Molina** **(Italy) Davide Rigon**	(Switzerland) Lucas Mauron (France) Arno Santamato (Austria) Gerhard Tweraser	(Italy) Andrea Bertolini (Netherlands) Niek Hommerson (Belgium) Louis Machiels	(Switzerland) Adrian Amstutz (Russia) Leo Machitski (Portugal) Miguel Ramos
3	(France) Paul Ricard	(United Kingdom) No. 107 Bentley Team M-Sport	**(United Kingdom) No. 107 Bentley Team M-Sport**	(France) No. AKKA ASP Team	(France) No. 87 AKKA ASP Team	(United Kingdom) No. 188 Garage 59
3	(France) Paul Ricard	(France) Jules Gounon (United Kingdom) Steven Kane (South Africa) Jordan Pepper	**(France) Jules Gounon** **(United Kingdom) Steven Kane** **(South Africa) Jordan Pepper**	(Germany) Nico Bastian (Russia) Timur Boguslavskiy (Brazil) Felipe Fraga	(France) Jean-Luc Beaubelique (France) Jim Pla (Belgium) Mauro Ricci	(United Kingdom) Chris Goodwin (United Kingdom) Chris Harris (United Kingdom) Alexander West
4	(Belgium) Spa-Francorchamps	(Germany) No. 4 Mercedes-AMG Team Black Falcon	**(United Arab Emirates) No. 20 GPX Racing**	(United Kingdom) No. 78 Barwell Motorsport	No. 97 Oman Racing with TF Sport	(Germany) No. 33 Rinaldi Racing
4	(Belgium) Spa-Francorchamps	(Netherlands) Yelmer Buurman (Germany) Maro Engel (Germany) Luca Stolz	**(Denmark) Michael Christensen** **(France) Kévin Estre** **(Austria) Richard Lietz**	(United Kingdom) Sandy Mitchell (United Kingdom) James Pull (United Kingdom) Jordan Witt	(Oman) Ahmad Al Harthy (Republic of Ireland) Charlie Eastwood (Turkey) Salih Yoluç (Denmark) Nicki Thiim	(Germany) Christian Hook (Germany) Manuel Lauck (Germany) Alexander Mattschull (Germany) Hendrik Still
5	(Spain) Barcelona-Catalunya	(Germany) No. 98 Rowe Racing	**(China) No. 563 Orange1 FFF Racing Team**	(France) No. 90 AKKA ASP Team	(France) No. 26 Saintéloc Racing	(Italy) No. 29 Raton Racing by Target
5	(Spain) Barcelona-Catalunya	(France) Romain Dumas (France) Mathieu Jaminet (Germany) Sven Müller	**(Italy) Andrea Caldarelli** **(Spain) Albert Costa** **(Italy) Marco Mapelli**	(Germany) Nico Bastian (Russia) Timur Boguslavskiy (Brazil) Felipe Fraga	(France) Edouard Cauhaupé (France) Pierre-Alexandre Jean (France) Pierre-Yves Paque	(Italy) Stefano Costantini (Spain) Toni Forné (Switzerland) Christoph Lenz

== Championship standings ==
Scoring system

Championship points are awarded for the first ten positions in each race. The pole-sitter also receives one point and entries are required to complete 75% of the winning car's race distance in order to be classified and earn points. Individual drivers are required to participate for a minimum of 25 minutes in order to earn championship points in any race.

Race points

Position	**1st**	**2nd**	**3rd**	**4th**	**5th**	**6th**	**7th**	**8th**	**9th**	**10th**	**Pole**
Points	25	18	15	12	10	8	6	4	2	1	1

1000 km Paul Ricard points

Position	**1st**	**2nd**	**3rd**	**4th**	**5th**	**6th**	**7th**	**8th**	**9th**	**10th**	**Pole**
Points	33	24	19	15	12	9	6	4	2	1	1

24 Hours of Spa points

Points are awarded after six hours, after twelve hours and at the finish.

Position	**1st**	**2nd**	**3rd**	**4th**	**5th**	**6th**	**7th**	**8th**	**9th**	**10th**	**Pole**
Points after 6hrs/12hrs	12	9	7	6	5	4	3	2	1	0	1
Points at the finish	25	18	15	12	10	8	6	4	2	1	1

=== Drivers' championships ===
==== Overall ====
Pos.	Driver	Team	MNZ (Italy)	SIL (United Kingdom)	LEC (France)	SPA (Belgium)			CAT (Spain)	Points
Pos.	Driver	Team	MNZ (Italy)	SIL (United Kingdom)	LEC (France)	6hrs	12hrs	24hrs	CAT (Spain)	Points
1	(Italy) Andrea Caldarelli (Italy) Marco Mapelli	(China) Orange1 FFF Racing Team	2	6	3	33	21	8	1	74
2	(Russia) Mikhail Aleshin (Spain) Miguel Molina (Italy) Davide Rigon	(Russia) SMP Racing	23	1	2	1	1	51	13	73
3	(Netherlands) Yelmer Buurman (Germany) Maro Engel (Germany) Luca Stolz	(Germany) Black Falcon	3	7	15				12	51
3	(Netherlands) Yelmer Buurman (Germany) Maro Engel (Germany) Luca Stolz	(Germany) Mercedes-AMG Team Black Falcon				**3**	**3**	**3**		51
4	(France) Jules Gounon (United Kingdom) Steven Kane (South Africa) Jordan Pepper	(United Kingdom) Bentley Team M-Sport	12	12	**1**	16	28	49	3	49
5	(Denmark) Dennis Lind	(China) Orange1 FFF Racing Team	2	6	3	33	21	8		49
6	(United Kingdom) Jake Dennis	(Switzerland) R-Motorsport	19	40	4	5	25	19	2	38
6	(Germany) Marvin Kirchhöfer	(Switzerland) R-Motorsport	19	DNS	4	5	25	19	2	38
6	(United Kingdom) Alex Lynn	(Switzerland) R-Motorsport			4	5	25	19	2	38
7	(France) Romain Dumas (France) Mathieu Jaminet (Germany) Sven Müller	(Germany) Rowe Racing	21	4	Ret	36	9	5	**6**	32
8	(Kuwait) Zaid Ashkanani (Italy) Andrea Rizzoli	(Italy) Dinamic Motorsport	1	18	37	18	4	27	Ret	31
8	(Austria) Klaus Bachler	(Italy) Dinamic Motorsport	1	18	37	18	4	27		31
9	(United Kingdom) Phil Keen (Italy) Giovanni Venturini	(China) Orange1 FFF Racing Team	17	2	20	19	16	21	4	30
10	(Denmark) Michael Christensen (France) Kévin Estre (Austria) Richard Lietz	(United Arab Emirates) GPX Racing				11	18	1		25
10	(Spain) Albert Costa	(China) Orange1 FFF Racing Team							1	25
11	(Germany) Nico Bastian (Russia) Timur Boguslavskiy (Brazil) Felipe Fraga	(France) AKKA ASP Team	4	10	11	14	14	17	5	23
12	(Australia) Matt Campbell (Norway) Dennis Olsen (Germany) Dirk Werner	(Germany) Rowe Racing	8	19	5	10	17	7	Ret	22
13	(Italy) Mirko Bortolotti (Germany) Christian Engelhart (Switzerland) Rolf Ineichen	(Austria) GRT Grasser Racing Team	**40**	**36**	7	2	6	16		21
14	(France) Franck Perera	(China) Orange1 FFF Racing Team	17	2	20	19	16	21		18
14	(France) Frédéric Makowiecki (France) Patrick Pilet (United Kingdom) Nick Tandy	(Germany) Rowe Racing				23	11	2		18
15	(Belgium) Maxime Soulet	(United Kingdom) Bentley Team M-Sport	6	14	6	52	63	Ret	29	17
15	(Spain) Andy Soucek	(United Kingdom) Bentley Team M-Sport	6	14	6				29	17
15	(Spain) Andy Soucek	(United Kingdom) M-Sport Team Bentley				37	34	29		17
16	(Germany) Patrick Assenheimer (Germany) Hubert Haupt	(Germany) Black Falcon	5	20	14	21	40	24	7	16
17	(Spain) Alex Riberas (Belgium) Dries Vanthoor	(Belgium) Belgian Audi Club Team WRT	18	3	Ret				25	15
17	(Spain) Alex Riberas (Belgium) Dries Vanthoor	(Belgium) Audi Sport Team WRT				17	24	25		15
17	(Argentina) Ezequiel Pérez Companc	(Belgium) Belgian Audi Club Team WRT	18	3	Ret				25	15
18	(Germany) Christopher Haase	(France) Saintéloc Racing	15	11	9				Ret	14
18	(Germany) Christopher Haase	(France) Audi Sport Team Saintéloc				12	10	4		14
19	(Germany) Markus Winkelhock	(France) Saintéloc Racing	29	Ret	30					12
19	(Germany) Markus Winkelhock	(France) Audi Sport Team Saintéloc				12	10	4		12
19	(Belgium) Frédéric Vervisch	(France) Audi Sport Team Saintéloc				12	10	4		12
19	(Italy) Giacomo Altoè	(China) Orange 1 FFF Racing Team				61	52	Ret	4	12
20	(Belgium) Bertrand Baguette (Germany) Mario Farnbacher (Netherlands) Renger van der Zande	(Italy) Honda Team Motul				7	19	6		11
19	(Australia) Nick Foster	(Germany) Attempto Racing	7	Ret	8				10	11
19	(Australia) Nick Foster	(Taiwan) HubAuto Corsa				69	69	Ret		11
21	(Austria) Clemens Schmid	(Germany) Attempto Racing	7	Ret	8	31	30	30	10	11
22	(Austria) Lucas Auer (Germany) Maximilian Buhk (Germany) Maximilian Götz	(Hong Kong) Mercedes-AMG Team GruppeM Racing				13	2	10		10
23	(Italy) Gabriele Piana	(Germany) Black Falcon	5	20	14	21	40	24		10
23	(United Kingdom) Lewis Williamson	(United Kingdom) Strakka Racing	22	5	Ret					10
23	(United Kingdom) Lewis Williamson	(United Kingdom) Mercedes-AMG Team Strakka Racing				32	12	20		10
23	(United Kingdom) Jack Hawksworth	(United Kingdom) Strakka Racing	22	5		45	33	32		10
23	(United States) Dev Gore	(United Kingdom) Strakka Racing	22	5	Ret					10
24	(South Africa) Kelvin van der Linde	(Germany) Attempto Racing	7	Ret	8	31	30	30		10
25	(Monaco) Vincent Abril (Italy) Raffaele Marciello	(France) Mercedes-AMG Team AKKA ASP	39	Ret	Ret	4	7	13	38	9
25	(Germany) Fabian Schiller	(France) Mercedes-AMG Team AKKA ASP				4	7	13		9
26	(United Kingdom) Callum MacLeod	(United Kingdom) Bentley Team M-Sport			6				29	9
26	(United Kingdom) Callum MacLeod	(United Kingdom) M-Sport Team Bentley				72	72	Ret		9
27	(United Kingdom) Alex Buncombe	(United Kingdom) Bentley Team M-Sport	6	14		52	63	Ret		8
28	(Netherlands) Nick Catsburg (Denmark) Mikkel Jensen (Norway) Christian Krognes	(Germany) Walkenhorst Motorsport				8	5	11		7
29	(Italy) David Fumanelli	(United Kingdom) Strakka Racing			Ret	45	33	32		6
29	(Italy) David Fumanelli	(Germany) Black Falcon							7	6
30	(United States) John Edwards (Brazil) Augusto Farfus (Germany) Martin Tomczyk	(Germany) BMW Team Schnitzer				6	13	Ret		4
31	(Switzerland) Lucas Mauron (France) Arno Santamato (Austria) Gerhard Tweraser	(Austria) GRT Grasser Racing Team	11	8	Ret	42	36	33	33	4
31	(Russia) Denis Bulatov (South Africa) David Perel (Russia) Rinat Salikhov	(Germany) Rinaldi Racing	25	13	16	57	61	Ret	8	4
32	(Netherlands) Robin Frijns (Switzerland) Nico Müller (Germany) René Rast	(Belgium) Audi Sport Team WRT				9	8	23		3
33	(New Zealand) Earl Bamber (Germany) Timo Bernhard (Belgium) Laurens Vanthoor	(Germany) KÜS Team75 Bernhard				22	23	9		2
33	(France) Simon Gachet	(France) Saintéloc Racing	15	11	9	62	56	48	Ret	2
33	(France) Steven Palette	(France) Saintéloc Racing	15	11	9	62	56	48		2
33	(Italy) Mattia Drudi (Netherlands) Pieter Schothorst (Netherlands) Steijn Schothorst	(Germany) Attempto Racing	24	9	Ret	15	62	Ret	15	2
33	(United Kingdom) Jonny Adam (France) Côme Ledogar (United Kingdom) Andrew Watson	(United Kingdom) Garage 59	9	Ret	Ret	71	71	Ret	Ret	2
33	(Monaco) Benjamin Goethe (South Africa) Jordan Grogor (United Kingdom) Stuart Hall	(United Arab Emirates) GPX Racing	DNS	28	21				9	2
34	(Belgium) Maxime Martin (United Kingdom) Matt Parry (France) Matthieu Vaxivière	(Switzerland) R-Motorsport	37	17	10	64	64	Ret	17	1
34	(Italy) Michele Beretta (United States) Taylor Proto	(China) Orange1 FFF Racing Team	10	Ret	17	61	52	Ret	21	1
34	(Mexico) Diego Menchaca	(China) Orange1 FFF Racing Team	10	Ret	17	61	52	Ret		1
34	(France) Valentin Hasse-Clot	(Germany) Attempto Racing							10	1
	(France) Pierre-Yves Paque	(France) Saintéloc Racing	29		30	62	56	48	11	0
	(France) Edouard Cauhaupe (France) Pierre-Alexandre Jean	(France) Saintéloc Racing							11	0
	(Netherlands) Rik Breukers (Belgium) Charles Weerts	(Belgium) Belgian Audi Club Team WRT	27	Ret	13	30	22	12	Ret	0
	(France) Norman Nato	(Belgium) Belgian Audi Club Team WRT			13	30	22	12	Ret	0
	(United Kingdom) Finlay Hutchison (Spain) Iván Pareras (Germany) Kim-Luis Schramm	(Germany) Phoenix Racing	14	21	12	29	48	Ret	34	0
	(United Kingdom) Gary Paffett (France) Tristan Vautier	(United Kingdom) Mercedes-AMG Team Strakka Racing				32	12	20		0
	(Switzerland) Philipp Frommenwiler (United States) Matt McMurry	(United Kingdom) Jenson Team Rocket RJN	13	16	22	25	29	31	39	0
	(United Kingdom) Struan Moore	(United Kingdom) Jenson Team Rocket RJN	13	16		25	29	31		0
	(Switzerland) Ricardo Feller (United Kingdom) Jamie Green (Germany) Christopher Mies	(Germany) Montaplast by Land Motorsport				24	15	14		0
	(Republic of Ireland) Charlie Eastwood (Oman) Ahmad Al Harthy (Turkey) Salih Yoluç	Oman Racing with TF Sport	35	23	26	26	20	22	14	0
	(United Kingdom) Sandy Mitchell (United Kingdom) James Pull (United Kingdom) Jordan Witt	(United Kingdom) Barwell Motorsport	26	15	Ret	20	27	15	18	0
	(United Kingdom) Chris Froggatt (Hong Kong) Jonathan Hui	(United Kingdom) Tempesta Racing	20	27	33	38	37	40	16	0
	(United Kingdom) Chris Buncombe	(United Kingdom) Tempesta Racing	20	27	33				16	0
	(Switzerland) Adrian Amstutz (Russia) Leo Machitski	(United Kingdom) Barwell Motorsport	16	29	29	28	31	35	31	0
	(Portugal) Miguel Ramos	(United Kingdom) Barwell Motorsport	16	29	29				31	0
	(Hong Kong) Alexandre Imperatori (United Kingdom) Oliver Jarvis (Italy) Edoardo Liberati	(Hong Kong) KCMG				27	26	18		0
	(Italy) Stefano Gattuso (United Kingdom) Dean Stoneman	(Italy) Ombra Racing	Ret	26	18	56	45	37		0
	(Belgium) Denis Dupont	(Italy) Ombra Racing		26	18	56	45	37		0
	(Denmark) Nicki Thiim	(Switzerland) R-Motorsport	19	40						0
	(Denmark) Nicki Thiim	Oman Racing with TF Sport				26	20	22		0
	(Australia) Shae Davies (United Kingdom) Alex MacDowall	(Belgium) Belgian Audi Club Team WRT	DNS						24	0
	(Australia) Shae Davies (United Kingdom) Alex MacDowall	(Belgium) Team WRT		24	19	41	42	34		0
	(France) Paul Petit	(Belgium) Belgian Audi Club Team WRT	DNS							0
	(France) Paul Petit	(Belgium) Team WRT		24	19	41	42	34		0
	(France) Romain Monti	(Italy) Ombra Racing	Ret							0
	(France) Romain Monti	(United Kingdom) Strakka Racing							19	0
	(Netherlands) Max Koebolt (Belgium) Esteban Muth	(United Kingdom) Strakka Racing							19	0
	(Italy) Stefano Costantini (Spain) Toni Forné (Switzerland) Christoph Lenz	(Italy) Raton Racing by Target	28	34	35	46	39	36	20	0
	(Saudi Arabia) Abdulaziz Al Faisal	(Germany) Black Falcon				21	40	24		0
	(Italy) Andrea Amici	(Austria) GRT Grasser Racing Team				42	36	33		0
	(Italy) Andrea Amici	(China) Orange1 FFF Racing Team							21	0
	(United Kingdom) Chris Goodwin (United Kingdom) Alexander West	(United Kingdom) Garage 59	30	33	24	40	41	47	22	0
	(United Kingdom) Chris Harris	(United Kingdom) Garage 59		33	24	40	41	47	22	0
	(Italy) Andrea Bertolini (Netherlands) Niek Hommerson (Belgium) Louis Machiels	(Italy) AF Corse	Ret	22	28	53	59	Ret	35	0
	(United Kingdom) Ryan Ratcliffe	(United Kingdom) Jenson Team Rocket RJN			22					0
	(United Kingdom) Ryan Ratcliffe	(United Kingdom) Team Parker Racing				65	66	Ret		0
	(United Kingdom) Derek Pierce	(United Kingdom) Team Parker Racing	Ret	30	36	65	66	Ret	23	0
	(United Kingdom) Seb Morris	(United Kingdom) Team Parker Racing	Ret	30	36				23	0
	(United Kingdom) Seb Morris	(United Kingdom) M-Sport Team Bentley				72	72	Ret		0
	(France) Jean-Luc Beaubelique (France) Jim Pla (Italy) Mauro Ricci	(France) AKKA ASP Team	Ret	35	23				36	0
	(United Kingdom) Sean Walkinshaw	(Belgium) Belgian Audi Club Team WRT							24	0
	(United Kingdom) Tom Onslow-Cole (Netherlands) Remon Vos	(United Kingdom) Ram Racing	38	25	25	35	32	26	Ret	0
	(United Kingdom) Darren Burke	(United Kingdom) Ram Racing			25	35	32	26		0
	(Mexico) Ricardo Sánchez	(Belgium) Belgian Audi Club Team WRT	27	Ret						0
	(Mexico) Ricardo Sánchez	(United Kingdom) Jenson Team Rocket RJN				25	29	31	39	0
	(Germany) Christian Hook (Germany) Manuel Lauck	(Germany) Rinaldi Racing	34	Ret	Ret	50	35	28	26	0
	(Netherlands) Christiaan Frankenhout	(United Kingdom) Ram Racing				35	32	26		0
	(Germany) Steve Parrow	(Germany) Rinaldi Racing	34	Ret	Ret				26	0
	(Singapore) Martin Berry (Germany) Pierre Ehret	(Germany) Rinaldi Racing	33	Ret	31	47	44	41	27	0
	(Finland) Rory Penttinen	(Germany) Rinaldi Racing				47	44	41	27	0
	(Switzerland) Mauro Calamia (Switzerland) Stefano Monaco (Switzerland) Roberto Pampanini	(Italy) Scuderia Villorba Corse			27	54	50	43		0
	(United Kingdom) Richard Abra (Finland) Patrick Kujala	(United Kingdom) Barwell Motorsport				28	31	35		0
	(Germany) Alexander Mattschull (Germany) Hendrik Still	(Germany) Rinaldi Racing				50	35	28		0
	(Austria) Jens Liebhauser (Germany) Florian Scholze	(Austria) HB Racing	36	37	Ret	43	43	38		0
	(Austria) Jens Liebhauser (Germany) Florian Scholze	(Italy) Raton Racing by Target							28	0
	(Germany) Wolfgang Triller	(Austria) HB Racing			Ret					0
	(Germany) Wolfgang Triller	(Italy) Raton Racing by Target							28	0
	(Brazil) Pipo Derani (Spain) Lucas Ordóñez	(United Kingdom) M-Sport Team Bentley				37	34	29		0
	(France) Fabien Michal	(France) Saintéloc Racing	29	Ret						0
	(Netherlands) Milan Dontje	(Germany) Attempto Racing				31	30	30		0
	(France) Claude-Yves Gosselin (Belgium) Renaud Kuppens	(Belgium) Boutsen Ginion	31	38	34				30	0
	(France) Marc Rostan	(Belgium) Boutsen Ginion	Ret	39	32	60	54	46	30	0
	(United Kingdom) Rob Smith	(United Kingdom) Team Parker Racing	Ret	30	36					0
	(France) Philippe Chatelet	(France) Saintéloc Racing			30					0
	(France) Fabien Barthez (Belgium) Bernard Delhez	(France) Tech 1 Racing	32	31	Ret	51	47	44	37	0
	(Argentina) José Manuel Balbiani	(Germany) Rinaldi Racing	33	Ret	31	47	44	41		0
	(Argentina) José Manuel Balbiani	(Italy) Daiko Lazarus Racing							Ret	0
	(France) Pierre Feligioni	(Belgium) Boutsen Ginion	31	38	34					0
	(Saudi Arabia) Karim Ojjeh	(Belgium) Boutsen Ginion	Ret	39	32	60	54	46	32	0
	(United States) Richard Heistand (Denmark) Christina Nielsen	(United Kingdom) Strakka Racing				45	33	32		0
	(South Africa) Gennaro Bonafede	(Belgium) Boutsen Ginion				60	54	46	32	0
	(Italy) Fabrizio Crestani (Germany) Nicolas Pohler (Switzerland) Kris Richard	(Italy) Daiko Lazarus Racing	WD	32	Ret	WD				0
	(Belgium) Angélique Detavernier	(Belgium) Boutsen Ginion			32					0
	(United Kingdom) Adam Christodoulou (Japan) Tatsuya Kataoka (Japan) Nobuteru Taniguchi	(Japan) Goodsmile Racing & Type-Moon Racing				34	55	Ret		0
	(Poland) Andrzej Lewandowski	(Austria) HB Racing	36	37						0
	(Poland) Andrzej Lewandowski	(Italy) Daiko Lazarus Racing							Ret	0
	(Italy) Alberto Di Folco	(Italy) Raton Racing by Target				46	39	36		0
	(Italy) Edward Cheever (Italy) Giancarlo Fisichella	(United Kingdom) Tempesta Racing				38	37	40		0
	(United States) Corey Lewis	(Italy) Ombra Racing				56	45	37		0
	(France) Eric Debard	(France) Tech 1 Racing							37	0
	(United Kingdom) Michael Meadows	(France) Mercedes-AMG Team AKKA ASP	39	Ret	Ret				38	0
	(France) Thomas Neubauer (Germany) Philipp Wlazik	(Austria) HB Racing				43	43	38		0
	(Switzerland) Mathias Beche (Hong Kong) Philippe Descombes (Hong Kong) John Shen (Denmark) Benny Simonsen	(Hong Kong) Modena Motorsports				49	38	42		0
	(Australia) Josh Burdon (Japan) Katsumasa Chiyo (Japan) Tsugio Matsuda	(Hong Kong) KCMG				58	46	39		0
	(Switzerland) Daniel Allemann (Germany) Ralf Bohn (Germany) Alfred Renauer (Germany) Robert Renauer	(Germany) Herberth Motorsport				39	60	Ret		0
	(Austria) Philipp Eng	(Belgium) Boutsen Ginion		39						0
	(United Kingdom) Ross Gunn	(United Kingdom) Garage 59				40	41	47		0
	(Switzerland) Ivan Jacoma	(Italy) Scuderia Villorba Corse				54	50	43		0
	(United Kingdom) Sam Bird (United Kingdom) James Calado (Italy) Alessandro Pier Guidi	(Italy) AF Corse				44	57	Ret		0
	(France) Éric Cayrolle	(France) Tech 1 Racing			Ret	51	47	44		0
	(France) Timothé Buret	(France) Tech 1 Racing				51	47	44		0
	(Hong Kong) Antares Au (Canada) Remo Ruscitti (Indonesia) Michael Soeryadjaya (Hong Kong) Francis Tija	(Hong Kong) OpenRoad Racing				59	53	45		0
	(France) Erik Maris	(Belgium) Boutsen Ginion				60	54	46		0
	(Czech Republic) Josef Král (Italy) Gabriele Lancieri (Italy) Matteo Malucelli (Czech Republic) Jiří Písařík	(Czech Republic) Bohemia Energy Racing with Scuderia Praha				48	51	Ret		0
	(France) Michael Blanchemain	(France) Saintéloc Racing				62	56	48		0
	(United Kingdom) Graham Davidson (France) Sylvain Debs (Spain) Fernando Navarrete (United Kingdom) Immanuel Vinke	(Italy) Daiko Lazarus Racing				55	49	Ret		0
	(Australia) Andrew Haryanto (Taiwan) Jeffrey Lee (Australia) Yasser Shahin (China) Jingzu Sun	(China) Audi Sport R8 LMS Cup				63	58	50		0
	(Finland) Markus Palttala	(United Kingdom) Bentley Team M-Sport				52	63	Ret		0
	(Finland) Toni Vilander	(Italy) AF Corse				53	59	Ret		0
	(Netherlands) Indy Dontje	(Germany) Rinaldi Racing				57	61	Ret		0
	(United Kingdom) Glynn Geddie (United Kingdom) Andy Meyrick	(United Kingdom) Team Parker Racing				65	66	Ret		0
	(France) Philippe Bourgeois (France) Jean-Paul Buffin (France) Philippe Haezebrouck (France) Gilles Vannelet	(France) 3Y Technology				67	67	Ret		0
	(United Kingdom) Ricky Collard (Austria) Ferdinand Habsburg (Switzerland) Hugo de Sadeleer (Finland) Aaro Vainio	(Switzerland) R-Motorsport				68	68	Ret		0
	(New Zealand) Nick Cassidy (Brazil) Daniel Serra	(Taiwan) HubAuto Corsa				69	69	Ret		0
	(Norway) Anders Buchardt (United Kingdom) David Pittard (Germany) Henry Walkenhorst (United States) Don Yount	(Germany) Walkenhorst Motorsport				70	70	Ret		0
	(Brazil) Rodrigo Baptista	(United Kingdom) M-Sport Team Bentley				72	72	Ret		0
	(Belgium) Philippe Stéveny	(Belgium) Boutsen Ginion	Ret							
	(Italy) Marco Antonelli (Italy) Giuseppe Cipriani (Italy) Davide Roda	(Italy) Antonelli Motorsport	Ret							
	(France) Nyls Stievenart	(France) Saintéloc Racing		Ret						
	(United States) August MacBeth	(Italy) Daiko Lazarus Racing							Ret	
	(France) Dorian Boccolacci	(France) Saintéloc Racing							Ret	
	(Germany) Marco Seefried	(Italy) Dinamic Motorsport							Ret	
	(Venezuela) Jonathan Cecotto	(Italy) Daiko Lazarus Racing				WD				
Entries ineligible to score points
	(Belgium) Loïc Deman (Belgium) Angélique Detavernier (Belgium) Marc Duez (Belgium) Stéphane Lémeret	(Belgium) 1969 Tribute				66	65	Ret		
Pos.	Driver	Team	MNZ (Italy)	SIL (United Kingdom)	LEC (France)	6hrs	12hrs	24hrs	CAT (Spain)	Points
Pos.	Driver	Team	MNZ (Italy)	SIL (United Kingdom)	LEC (France)	SPA (Belgium)			CAT (Spain)	Points

Key
Colour	Result
Gold	Race winner
Silver	2nd place
Bronze	3rd place
Green	Points finish
Blue	Non-points finish
Blue	Non-classified finish (NC)
Purple	Did not finish (Ret)
Black	Disqualified (DSQ)
Black	Excluded (EX)
White	Did not start (DNS)
White	Race cancelled (C)
White	Withdrew (WD)
Blank	Did not participate

**Bold** – Pole
Italics – Fastest Lap

==== Silver Cup ====
Pos.	Driver	Team	MNZ (Italy)	SIL (United Kingdom)	LEC (France)	SPA (Belgium)			CAT (Spain)	Points
Pos.	Driver	Team	MNZ (Italy)	SIL (United Kingdom)	LEC (France)	6hrs	12hrs	24hrs	CAT (Spain)	Points
1	(Germany) Nico Bastian (Russia) Timur Boguslavskiy (Brazil) Felipe Fraga	(France) AKKA ASP Team	**4**	10	11	14	14	17	**5**	142
2	(Germany) Patrick Assenheimer (Germany) Hubert Haupt	(Germany) Black Falcon	5	20	14	21	40	24	7	87
3	(Italy) Gabriele Piana	(Germany) Black Falcon	5	20	14	21	40	24		69
4	(United Kingdom) Sandy Mitchell (United Kingdom) James Pull (United Kingdom) Jordan Witt	(United Kingdom) Barwell Motorsport	26	15	Ret	20	27	15	18	61
5	(Switzerland) Lucas Mauron (France) Arno Santamato (Austria) Gerhard Tweraser	(Austria) GRT Grasser Racing Team	11	8	Ret	42	36	33	33	56
6	(Italy) Mattia Drudi (Netherlands) Pieter Schothorst (Netherlands) Steijn Schothorst	(Germany) Attempto Racing	24	**9**	**Ret**	**15**	**62**	**Ret**	15	46
7	(Russia) Denis Bulatov (South Africa) David Perel (Russia) Rinat Salikhov	(Germany) Rinaldi Racing	25	13	16	57	61	Ret	8	46
8	(Switzerland) Philipp Frommenwiler (United States) Matt McMurry	(United Kingdom) Jenson Team Rocket RJN	13	16	22	25	29	31	39	44
9	(United Kingdom) Finlay Hutchison (Spain) Iván Pareras (Germany) Kim-Luis Schramm	(Germany) Phoenix Racing	14	21	12	29	48	Ret	34	42
10	(United Kingdom) Struan Moore	(United Kingdom) Jenson Team Rocket RJN	13	16		25	29	31		42
11	(Italy) Michele Beretta (United States) Taylor Proto	(China) Orange1 FFF Racing Team	10	Ret	17	61	52	Ret	21	32
12	(Mexico) Diego Menchaca	(China) Orange1 FFF Racing Team	10	Ret	17	61	52	Ret		28
13	(Saudi Arabia) Abdulaziz Al Faisal	(Germany) Black Falcon				29	48	24		26
14	(Mexico) Ricardo Sánchez	(Belgium) Belgian Audi Club Team WRT	27	Ret						25
14	(Mexico) Ricardo Sánchez	(United Kingdom) Jenson Team Rocket RJN				25	29	31	39	25
15	(Australia) Shae Davies (United Kingdom) Alex MacDowall	(Belgium) Belgian Audi Club Team WRT	DNS						24	25
15	(Australia) Shae Davies (United Kingdom) Alex MacDowall	(Belgium) Team WRT		24	19	41	42	34		25
16	(France) Paul Petit	(Belgium) Belgian Audi Club Team WRT	DNS							23
16	(France) Paul Petit	(Belgium) Team WRT		24	19	41	42	34		23
17	(Italy) Andrea Amici	(Austria) GRT Grasser Racing Team				42	36	33		18
17	(Italy) Andrea Amici	(China) Orange1 FFF Racing Team							21	18
18	(Italy) Stefano Gattuso (United Kingdom) Dean Stoneman	(Italy) Ombra Racing	Ret	26	18	56	45	37		20
18	(Belgium) Denis Dupont	(Italy) Ombra Racing		26	18	56	45	37		20
19	(Italy) David Fumanelli	(Germany) Black Falcon							7	18
20	(Monaco) Benjamin Goethe (South Africa) Jordan Grogor (United Kingdom) Stuart Hall	(United Arab Emirates) GPX Racing	DNS	28	21				9	16
21	(United States) Corey Lewis	(Italy) Ombra Racing				56	45	37		10
22	(France) Romain Monti	(Italy) Ombra Racing	Ret							6
22	(France) Romain Monti	(United Kingdom) Strakka Racing							19	6
22	(Netherlands) Max Koebolt (Belgium) Esteban Muth	(United Kingdom) Strakka Racing							19	6
23	(United Kingdom) Ryan Ratcliffe	(United Kingdom) Jenson Team Rocket RJN			22					2
23	(United Kingdom) Sean Walkinshaw	(Belgium) Belgian Audi Club Team WRT							24	2
24	(Italy) Giacomo Altoè	(China) Orange 1 FFF Racing Team				61	52	Ret		1
25	(Netherlands) Rik Breukers (Belgium) Charles Weerts	(Belgium) Belgian Audi Club Team WRT	27	Ret						1
25	(Switzerland) Mauro Calamia (Switzerland) Stefano Monaco (Switzerland) Roberto Pampanini	(Italy) Scuderia Villorba Corse			27					1
	(Italy) Fabrizio Crestani (Germany) Nicolas Pohler (Switzerland) Kris Richard	(Italy) Daiko Lazarus Racing	WD	32	Ret	WD				0
	(United Kingdom) Ricky Collard (Austria) Ferdinand Habsburg (Switzerland) Hugo de Sadeleer (Finland) Aaro Vainio	(Switzerland) R-Motorsport				68	68	Ret		0
	(Venezuela) Jonathan Cecotto	(Italy) Daiko Lazarus Racing				WD				
Pos.	Driver	Team	MNZ (Italy)	SIL (United Kingdom)	LEC (France)	6hrs	12hrs	24hrs	CAT (Spain)	Points
Pos.	Driver	Team	MNZ (Italy)	SIL (United Kingdom)	LEC (France)	SPA (Belgium)			CAT (Spain)	Points

==== Pro-Am Cup ====
Pos.	Driver	Team	MNZ (Italy)	SIL (United Kingdom)	LEC (France)	SPA (Belgium)			CAT (Spain)	Points
Pos.	Driver	Team	MNZ (Italy)	SIL (United Kingdom)	LEC (France)	6hrs	12hrs	24hrs	CAT (Spain)	Points
1	(Republic of Ireland) Charlie Eastwood (Oman) Ahmad Al Harthy (Turkey) Salih Yoluç	Oman Racing with TF Sport	**35**	**23**^{1}	**26**	26	20	22	14	122
2	(United Kingdom) Tom Onslow-Cole (Netherlands) Remon Vos	(United Kingdom) Ram Racing	38	25	25	**35**	**32**	**26**	Ret	88
3	(United Kingdom) Chris Froggatt (Hong Kong) Jonathan Hui	(United Kingdom) Tempesta Racing	20	27	33	38	37	40	16	86
4	(France) Pierre-Yves Paque	(France) Saintéloc Racing	29		30	62	56	48	11	63
5	(United Kingdom) Chris Buncombe	(United Kingdom) Tempesta Racing	20	27	33				16	61
6	(United Kingdom) Darren Burke	(United Kingdom) Ram Racing			25	**35**	**32**	**26**		61
7	(Italy) Andrea Bertolini (Netherlands) Niek Hommerson (Belgium) Louis Machiels	(Italy) AF Corse	Ret	22	28	53	59	Ret	35	51
8	(Denmark) Nicki Thiim	Oman Racing with TF Sport				26	20	22		49
9	(France) Jean-Luc Beaubelique (France) Jim Pla (Italy) Mauro Ricci	(France) AKKA ASP Team	Ret	35	23				**36**	48
10	(Netherlands) Christiaan Frankenhout	(United Kingdom) Ram Racing				**35**	**32**	**26**		37
11	(Germany) Markus Winkelhock	(France) Saintéloc Racing	29	Ret	30					30
12	(United Kingdom) Derek Pierce	(United Kingdom) Team Parker Racing	Ret	30	36	65	66	Ret	23	28
12	(United Kingdom) Seb Morris	(United Kingdom) Team Parker Racing	Ret	30	36				23	28
13	(Italy) David Fumanelli (United Kingdom) Jack Hawksworth (United States) Richard Heistand (Denmark) Christina Nielsen	(United Kingdom) Strakka Racing				45	33	32		27
14	(France) Edouard Cauhaupe (France) Pierre-Alexandre Jean	(France) Saintéloc Racing							11	25
15	(Italy) Edward Cheever (Italy) Giancarlo Fisichella	(United Kingdom) Tempesta Racing				38	37	40		25
16	(France) Fabien Michal	(France) Saintéloc Racing	29	Ret						18
17	(Switzerland) Mathias Beche (Hong Kong) Philippe Descombes (Hong Kong) John Shen (Denmark) Benny Simonsen	(Hong Kong) Modena Motorsports				49	38	42		18
18	(Saudi Arabia) Karim Ojjeh	(Belgium) Boutsen Ginion		39					32	16
18	(United Kingdom) Rob Smith	(United Kingdom) Team Parker Racing	Ret	30	36					16
19	(Switzerland) Mauro Calamia (Switzerland) Ivan Jacoma (Switzerland) Stefano Monaco (Switzerland) Roberto Pampanini	(Italy) Scuderia Villorba Corse				54	50	43		13
20	(France) Philippe Chatelet	(France) Saintéloc Racing			30					12
21	(South Africa) Gennaro Bonafede	(Belgium) Boutsen Ginion							32	10
22	(France) Michael Blanchemain (France) Simon Gachet (France) Steven Palette	(France) Saintéloc Racing				62	56	48		8
23	(Czech Republic) Josef Král (Italy) Gabriele Lancieri (Italy) Matteo Malucelli (Czech Republic) Jiří Písařík	(Czech Republic) Bohemia Energy racing with Scuderia Praha				48	51	Ret		7
24	(Switzerland) Daniel Allemann (Germany) Ralf Bohn (Germany) Alfred Renauer (Germany) Robert Renauer	(Germany) Herberth Motorsport				39	60	Ret		6
25	(Austria) Philipp Eng (France) Marc Rostan	(Belgium) Boutsen Ginion		39						6
26	(Finland) Toni Vilander	(Italy) AF Corse				53	59	Ret		3
	(United Kingdom) Glynn Geddie (United Kingdom) Andy Meyrick (United Kingdom) Ryan Ratcliffe	(United Kingdom) Team Parker Racing				65	66	Ret		0
	(France) Nyls Stievenart	(France) Saintéloc Racing		Ret						
Entries ineligible to score points
	(Belgium) Loïc Deman (Belgium) Angélique Detavernier (Belgium) Marc Duez (Belgium) Stéphane Lémeret	(Belgium) 1969 Tribute				66	65	Ret		
Pos.	Driver	Team	MNZ (Italy)	SIL (United Kingdom)	LEC (France)	6hrs	12hrs	24hrs	CAT (Spain)	Points
Pos.	Driver	Team	MNZ (Italy)	SIL (United Kingdom)	LEC (France)	SPA (Belgium)			CAT (Spain)	Points

Notes

- ^{1} – Charlie Eastwood, Ahmad Al Harthy and Salih Yoluç lost the point for Pole position after a breach of article 19.6, after the gantry camera card was not submitted in time.

==== Am Cup ====
Pos.	Driver	Team	MNZ (Italy)	SIL (United Kingdom)	LEC (France)	SPA (Belgium)			CAT (Spain)	Points
Pos.	Driver	Team	MNZ (Italy)	SIL (United Kingdom)	LEC (France)	6hrs	12hrs	24hrs	CAT (Spain)	Points
1	(Switzerland) Adrian Amstutz (Russia) Leo Machitski	(United Kingdom) Barwell Motorsport	**16**	**29**	29	**28**	**31**	**35**	**31**	126
2	(United Kingdom) Chris Goodwin (United Kingdom) Alexander West	(United Kingdom) Garage 59	30	33	**24**	40	41	47	22	99
3	(Italy) Stefano Costantini (Spain) Toni Forné (Switzerland) Christoph Lenz	(Italy) Raton Racing by Target	28	34	35	46	39	36	20	92
4	(United Kingdom) Chris Harris	(United Kingdom) Garage 59		33	**24**	40	41	47	22	84
5	(Portugal) Miguel Ramos	(United Kingdom) Barwell Motorsport	**16**	**29**	29				**31**	83
6	(Germany) Christian Hook (Germany) Manuel Lauck	(Germany) Rinaldi Racing	34	Ret	Ret	50	35	28	26	59
7	(Singapore) Martin Berry (Germany) Pierre Ehret	(Germany) Rinaldi Racing	33	Ret	31	47	44	41	27	58
8	(Austria) Jens Liebhauser (Germany) Florian Scholze	(Austria) HB Racing	36	37	Ret	43	43	38		48
8	(Austria) Jens Liebhauser (Germany) Florian Scholze	(Italy) Raton Racing by Target							28	48
9	(France) Fabien Barthez (Belgium) Bernard Delhez	(France) Tech 1 Racing	32	31	Ret	51	47	44	37	46
10	(Argentina) José Manuel Balbiani	(Germany) Rinaldi Racing	33	Ret	31	47	44	41		46
10	(Argentina) José Manuel Balbiani	(Italy) Daiko Lazarus Racing							Ret	46
11	(United Kingdom) Richard Abra (Finland) Patrick Kujala	(United Kingdom) Barwell Motorsport				**28**	**31**	**35**		43
12	(France) Claude-Yves Gosselin (Belgium) Renaud Kuppens	(Belgium) Boutsen Ginion	31	38	34				30	40
13	(Germany) Alexander Mattschull (Germany) Hendrik Still	(Germany) Rinaldi Racing				50	35	28		38
14	(France) Pierre Feligioni	(Belgium) Boutsen Ginion	31	38	34					32
15	(Finland) Rory Penttinen	(Germany) Rinaldi Racing				47	44	41	27	31
16	(Italy) Alberto Di Folco	(Italy) Raton Racing by Target				46	39	36		28
17	(France) Marc Rostan	(Belgium) Boutsen Ginion	Ret		32	60	54	46	30	27
18	(France) Thomas Neubauer (Germany) Philipp Wlazik	(Austria) HB Racing				43	43	38		24
19	(Germany) Steve Parrow	(Germany) Rinaldi Racing	34	Ret	Ret				26	21
20	(Saudi Arabia) Karim Ojjeh	(Belgium) Boutsen Ginion	Ret		32	60	54	46		19
21	(United Kingdom) Ross Gunn	(United Kingdom) Garage 59				40	41	47		17
22	(Belgium) Angélique Detavernier	(Belgium) Boutsen Ginion			32					15
23	(Poland) Andrzej Lewandowski	(Austria) HB Racing	36	37						14
23	(Poland) Andrzej Lewandowski	(Italy) Daiko Lazarus Racing							Ret	14
24	(France) Éric Cayrolle	(France) Tech 1 Racing			Ret	51	47	44		14
24	(France) Timothé Buret	(France) Tech 1 Racing				51	47	44		14
25	(Germany) Wolfgang Triller	(Austria) HB Racing			Ret					10
25	(Germany) Wolfgang Triller	(Italy) Raton Racing by Target							28	10
26	(Hong Kong) Antares Au (Canada) Remo Ruscitti (Indonesia) Michael Soeryadjaya (Hong Kong) Francis Tija	(Hong Kong) OpenRoad Racing				59	53	45		8
27	(United Kingdom) Graham Davidson (France) Sylvain Debs (Spain) Fernando Navarrente (United Kingdom) Immanuel Vinke	(Italy) Daiko Lazarus Racing				55	49	Ret		4
28	(France) Eric Debard	(France) Tech 1 Racing							37	4
28	(South Africa) Gennaro Bonafede (France) Erik Maris	(Belgium) Boutsen Ginion				60	54	46		4
29	(Australia) Andrew Haryanto (Taiwan) Jeffrey Lee (Australia) Yasser Shahin (China) Jingzu Sun	(China) Audi Sport R8 LMS Cup				63	58	50		1
	(France) Philippe Bourgeois (France) Jean-Paul Buffin (France) Philippe Haezebrouck (France) Gilles Vannelet	(France) 3Y Technology				67	67	Ret		0
	(Norway) Anders Buchardt (United Kingdom) David Pittard (Germany) Henry Walkenhorst (United States) Don Yount	(Germany) Walkenhorst Motorsport				70	70	Ret		0
	(Belgium) Philippe Stéveny	(Belgium) Boutsen Ginion	Ret							
	(Italy) Marco Antonelli (Italy) Giuseppe Cipriani (Italy) Davide Roda	(Italy) Antonelli Motorsport	Ret							
	(United States) August MacBeth	(Italy) Daiko Lazarus Racing							Ret	
Pos.	Driver	Team	MNZ (Italy)	SIL (United Kingdom)	LEC (France)	6hrs	12hrs	24hrs	CAT (Spain)	Points
Pos.	Driver	Team	MNZ (Italy)	SIL (United Kingdom)	LEC (France)	SPA (Belgium)			CAT (Spain)	Points

=== Teams' championships ===
==== Overall ====
Pos.	Team	Manufacturer	MNZ (Italy)	SIL (United Kingdom)	LEC (France)	SPA (Belgium)			CAT (Spain)	Points
Pos.	Team	Manufacturer	MNZ (Italy)	SIL (United Kingdom)	LEC (France)	6hrs	12hrs	24hrs	CAT (Spain)	Points
1	(China) Orange1 FFF Racing Team	Lamborghini	2	2	3	19	16	8	1	90
2	(Russia) SMP Racing	Ferrari	23	1	2	1	1	51	13	73
3	(Germany) Rowe Racing	Porsche	8	4	5	10	9	2	**6**	65
4	(Germany) (Mercedes-AMG Team) Black Falcon	Mercedes-AMG	3	7	14	**3**	**3**	**3**	7	63
5	(United Kingdom) Bentley Team M-Sport/M-Sport Team Bentley	Bentley	6	12	**1**	16	28	29	3	59
6	(France) (Mercedes-AMG Team) AKKA ASP	Mercedes-AMG	4	10	11	4	7	13	5	45
7	(Switzerland) R-Motorsport	Aston Martin	19	17	4	5	25	19	2	39
8	(Austria) GRT Grasser Racing Team	Lamborghini	**11**	**8**	7	2	6	16	33	36
9	(Italy) Dinamic Motorsport	Porsche	1	18	37	18	4	27	Ret	32
10	(United Arab Emirates) GPX Racing	Porsche	DNS	28	21	11	18	1	9	31
11	(Belgium) (Audi Sport/Belgian Audi Club) Team WRT	Audi	18	3	13	9	8	12	24	31
12	(France) (Audi Sport Team) Saintéloc Racing	Audi	15	11	9	12	10	4	11	21
13	(Germany) Attempto Racing	Audi	7	9	8	15	30	30	10	20
14	(United Kingdom) (Mercedes-AMG Team) Strakka Racing	Mercedes-AMG	22	5	Ret	32	12	20	19	11
15	(Germany) Rinaldi Racing	Ferrari	25	13	16	47	35	28	8	6
16	(United Kingdom) Garage 59	Aston Martin	9	33	24	40	41	47	22	4
16	(United Kingdom) Barwell Motorsport	Lamborghini	16	15	29	20	27	15	18	4
17	(Germany) Phoenix Racing	Audi	14	21	12	29	48	Ret	34	1
17	(United Kingdom) Jenson Team Rocket RJN	Honda	13	16	22	25	29	31	39	1
	Oman Racing with TF Sport	Aston Martin	35	23	26	26	20	22	14	0
	(Italy) AF Corse (United Kingdom) Tempesta Racing	Ferrari	20	22	28	38	37	40	16	0
	(Italy) Ombra Racing	Lamborghini	Ret	26	18	56	45	37		0
	(Italy) Raton Racing by Target	Lamborghini	28	34	35	46	39	36	20	0
	(United Kingdom) Team Parker Racing	Bentley	Ret	30	36	65	66	Ret	23	0
	(United Kingdom) Ram Racing	Mercedes-AMG	38	25	25	35	32	26	Ret	0
	(Italy) Scuderia Villorba Corse	Mercedes-AMG			27	54	50	43		0
	(Belgium) Boutsen Ginion	BMW; Lamborghini	31	38	32	60	54	46	30	0
	(France) Tech 1 Racing	Lexus	32	31	Ret	51	47	44	37	0
	(Italy) Daiko Lazarus Racing	Lamborghini	WD	32	Ret	55	49	Ret	Ret	0
	(Austria) HB Racing	Ferrari	36	37	Ret	43	43	38		0
	(Italy) Antonelli Motorsport	Mercedes-AMG	Ret							
Entries ineligible to score points
	(Hong Kong) Mercedes-AMG Team GruppeM Racing	Mercedes-AMG				13	2	10		
	(Germany) Walkenhorst Motorsport	BMW				8	5	11		
	(Italy) Honda Team Motul	Honda				7	19	6		
	(Germany) BMW Team Schnitzer	BMW				8	13	Ret		
	(Germany) KÜS Team75 Bernhard	Porsche				22	23	9		
	(Hong Kong) KCMG	Nissan				27	26	18		
	(Japan) Goodsmile Racing & Type-Moon Racing	Mercedes-AMG				34	55	Ret		
	(Germany) Herberth Motorsport	Porsche				39	60	Ret		
	(Hong Kong) Modena Motorsports	Porsche				49	38	42		
	(Hong Kong) OpenRoad Racing	Porsche				59	53	45		
	(Czech Republic) Bohemia Energy racing with Scuderia Praha	Ferrari				48	51	Ret		
	(China) Audi Sport R8 LMS Cup	Audi				63	58	50		
	(Belgium) 1969 Tribute	Porsche				66	65	Ret		
	(France) 3Y Technology	BMW				67	67	Ret		
	(Taiwan) HubAuto Corsa	Ferrari				69	69	Ret		
Pos.	Team	Manufacturer	MNZ (Italy)	SIL (United Kingdom)	LEC (France)	6hrs	12hrs	24hrs	CAT (Spain)	Points
Pos.	Team	Manufacturer	MNZ (Italy)	SIL (United Kingdom)	LEC (France)	SPA (Belgium)			CAT (Spain)	Points

==== Silver Cup ====
Pos.	Team	Manufacturer	MNZ (Italy)	SIL (United Kingdom)	LEC (France)	SPA (Belgium)			CAT (Spain)	Points
Pos.	Team	Manufacturer	MNZ (Italy)	SIL (United Kingdom)	LEC (France)	6hrs	12hrs	24hrs	CAT (Spain)	Points
1	(France) AKKA ASP Team	Mercedes-AMG	**4**	10	11	14	14	17	**5**	142
2	(Germany) Black Falcon	Mercedes-AMG	5	20	14	21	40	24	7	87
3	(United Kingdom) Barwell Motorsport	Lamborghini	26	15	Ret	20	27	15	18	61
4	(Austria) GRT Grasser Racing Team	Lamborghini	11	8	Ret	42	36	33	33	56
5	(Germany) Attempto Racing	Audi	24	**9**	**Ret**	**15**	**62**	**Ret**	15	46
6	(Germany) Rinaldi Racing	Ferrari	25	13	16	57	61	Ret	8	46
7	(United Kingdom) Jenson Team Rocket RJN	Honda	13	16	22	25	29	31	39	44
8	(Germany) Phoenix Racing	Audi	14	21	12	29	48	Ret	34	42
9	(China) Orange1 FFF Racing Team	Lamborghini	10	Ret	17	61	52	Ret	21	31
10	(Belgium) (Belgian Audi Club) Team WRT	Audi	27	24	19	41	42	34	24	26
11	(Italy) Ombra Racing	Lamborghini	Ret	26	18	56	45	37		20
12	(United Arab Emirates) GPX Racing	Porsche	DNS	28	21				9	16
13	(United Kingdom) Strakka Racing	Mercedes-AMG							19	6
14	(Italy) Scuderia Villorba Corse	Mercedes-AMG			27					1
	(Italy) Daiko Lazarus Racing	Lamborghini	WD	32	Ret	WD				0
	(Switzerland) R-Motorsport	Aston Martin				68	68	Ret		0
Pos.	Team	Manufacturer	MNZ (Italy)	SIL (United Kingdom)	LEC (France)	6hrs	12hrs	24hrs	CAT (Spain)	Points
Pos.	Team	Manufacturer	MNZ (Italy)	SIL (United Kingdom)	LEC (France)	SPA (Belgium)			CAT (Spain)	Points

==== Pro-Am Cup ====
Pos.	Team	Manufacturer	MNZ (Italy)	SIL (United Kingdom)	LEC (France)	SPA (Belgium)			CAT (Spain)	Points
Pos.	Team	Manufacturer	MNZ (Italy)	SIL (United Kingdom)	LEC (France)	6hrs	12hrs	24hrs	CAT (Spain)	Points
1	Oman Racing with TF Sport	Aston Martin	**35**	**23**^{1}	**26**	26	20	22	14	122
2	(Italy) AF Corse (United Kingdom) Tempesta Racing	Ferrari	20	22	28	38	37	40	16	105
3	(United Kingdom) Ram Racing	Mercedes-AMG	38	25	25	**35**	**32**	**26**	Ret	88
4	(France) Saintéloc Racing	Audi	29	Ret	30	62	56	48	11	71
5	(France) AKKA ASP Team	Mercedes-AMG	Ret	35	23				**36**	52
6	(United Kingdom) Team Parker Racing	Bentley	Ret	30	36	65	66	Ret	23	39
7	(United Kingdom) Strakka Racing	Mercedes-AMG				45	33	32		27
8	(Italy) Scuderia Villorba Corse	Mercedes-AMG				54	50	43		20
9	(Belgium) Boutsen Ginion	BMW		39					32	18
Entries ineligible to score points
	(Hong Kong) Modena Motorsports	Porsche				49	38	42		
	(Germany) Herberth Motorsport	Porsche				39	60	Ret		
	(Czech Republic) Bohemia Energy racing with Scuderia Praha	Ferrari				48	51	Ret		
	(Belgium) 1969 Tribute	Porsche				66	65	Ret		
Pos.	Team	Manufacturer	MNZ (Italy)	SIL (United Kingdom)	LEC (France)	6hrs	12hrs	24hrs	CAT (Spain)	Points
Pos.	Team	Manufacturer	MNZ (Italy)	SIL (United Kingdom)	LEC (France)	SPA (Belgium)			CAT (Spain)	Points

Notes

- ^{1} – Oman Racing with TF Sport lost the point for Pole position after a breach of article 19.6, after the gantry camera card was not submitted in time.

==== Am Cup ====
Pos.	Team	Manufacturer	MNZ (Italy)	SIL (United Kingdom)	LEC (France)	SPA (Belgium)			CAT (Spain)	Points
Pos.	Team	Manufacturer	MNZ (Italy)	SIL (United Kingdom)	LEC (France)	6hrs	12hrs	24hrs	CAT (Spain)	Points
1	(United Kingdom) Barwell Motorsport	Lamborghini	**16**	**29**	29	**28**	**31**	**35**	**31**	130
2	(United Kingdom) Garage 59	Aston Martin	30	33	**24**	40	41	47	22	103
3	(Italy) Raton Racing by Target	Lamborghini	28	34	35	46	39	36	20	95
4	(Germany) Rinaldi Racing	Ferrari	33	Ret	31	47	35	28	26	81
5	(Belgium) Boutsen Ginion	BMW; Lamborghini	31	38	32	60	54	46	30	59
6	(France) Tech 1 Racing	Lexus	32	31	Ret	51	47	44	37	54
7	(Austria) HB Racing	Ferrari	36	37	Ret	43	43	38		40
8	(Italy) Daiko Lazarus Racing	Lamborghini				55	49	Ret	Ret	10
	(Italy) Antonelli Motorsport	Mercedes-AMG	Ret							
Entries ineligible to score points
	(Hong Kong) OpenRoad Racing	Porsche				59	53	45		
	(China) Audi Sport R8 LMS Cup	Audi				63	58	50		
	(France) 3Y Technology	BMW				67	67	Ret		
	(Germany) Walkenhorst Motorsport	BMW				70	70	Ret		
Pos.	Team	Manufacturer	MNZ (Italy)	SIL (United Kingdom)	LEC (France)	6hrs	12hrs	24hrs	CAT (Spain)	Points
Pos.	Team	Manufacturer	MNZ (Italy)	SIL (United Kingdom)	LEC (France)	SPA (Belgium)			CAT (Spain)	Points

== See also ==
- 2019 GT Series
- 2019 GT World Challenge America
- 2019 GT World Challenge Asia
- 2019 GT World Challenge Europe
