= 2016 Porsche Carrera Cup Germany =

Motor racing competition

The 2016 Porsche Carrera Cup Deutschland season was the 31st German Porsche Carrera Cup season. It began on 16 April at Oschersleben and finished on 16 October at Hockenheimring after eight double-header meetings, It was a support championship for the ADAC GT Masters Oschersleben round and Deutsche Tourenwagen Masters season.

== Teams and drivers ==
Team	No.	Drivers	Class	Rounds
(Germany) Rookie Team Deutsche Post by Project 1	1	(Germany) David Kolkmann	A R	All
(Germany) Rookie Team Deutsche Post by Project 1	2	(United Kingdom) Nick Yelloly	A R	All
(Germany) Rookie Team Deutsche Post by Project 1	36	(Germany) Richy Müller	G	7–8
(Germany) Rookie Team Deutsche Post by Project 1	37	(Germany) Nico Menzel	G	7
(Germany) Konrad Motorsport	6	(United Kingdom) Ryan Cullen	A R	1–6
(Germany) Konrad Motorsport	6	(Australia) Nick Foster	A	7–8
(Germany) Konrad Motorsport	7	(Germany) Sven Müller	A	All
(Germany) Konrad Motorsport	8	(Austria) Luca Rettenbacher	A R	All
(Germany) Konrad Motorsport	35	(Netherlands) Ronald van de Laar	G	5
(Germany) Konrad Motorsport	45	(Austria) Philipp Sager	G	8
(Austria) Team Lechner Huber Racing	9	(Netherlands) Wolf Nathan	B	All
(Austria) Team Lechner Huber Racing	10	(Switzerland) Jeffrey Schmidt	A	All
(Austria) Team Lechner Huber Racing	13	(Germany) Wolfgang Triller	B	All
(Austria) Team Lechner Huber Racing	21	(Norway) Dennis Olsen	A R	All
(Austria) Team Lechner Huber Racing	30	(Sweden) Philip Morin	G	1
(Austria) Team Lechner Huber Racing	38	(Sweden) Philip Morin	G	7
(Austria) Team Lechner Huber Racing	32	(Austria) Philipp Sager	G	3
(Germany) MRS GT-Racing	14	(Germany) Christian Engelhart	A	All
(Germany) MRS GT-Racing	15	(Peru) Ricardo Flores Ramirez	B	1–6
(Germany) MRS GT-Racing	15	(Luxembourg) Dylan Pereira	A	7
(Germany) MRS GT-Racing	15	(Germany) Siegfried Venema	B	8
(Germany) KÜS Team 75 Bernhard	17	(Australia) Nick Foster	A	1–6
(Germany) KÜS Team 75 Bernhard	17	(Germany) Michael Ammermüller	A	7
(Germany) KÜS Team 75 Bernhard	17	(Italy) Matteo Cairoli	A	8
(Germany) KÜS Team 75 Bernhard	18	(Germany) Marek Böckmann	A R	All
(Sweden) PFI Racing	20	(Sweden) Henric Skoog	G	8
(Sweden) PFI Racing	95	(Sweden) Patrick Skoog	B G	8
(Italy) Ebimotors	31	(Italy) Matteo Cairoli	G	3
(Germany) Wiesmann Motorsport	33	(Germany) Daniel Keilwitz	G	4
(Poland) FÖRCH Racing by Lukas Motorsport	34	(Poland) Robert Lukas	G	4
(Sweden) Fragus BR Motorsport	39	(Sweden) Pontus Fredricsson	G	8
(Sweden) Fragus BR Motorsport	40	(Sweden) Robin Hansson	G	8
(Sweden) Mtech Competition	41	(Sweden) Magnus Öhman	B G	8
(Sweden) Mtech Competition	42	(Sweden) Lars-Bertil Rantzow	B G	8
(Sweden) Cirkus Karlsson Racing	43	(Sweden) Philip Morin	G	8
(Sweden) Cirkus Karlsson Racing	44	(Sweden) Matte Karlsson	B G	8

Icon	Class
A	A-class
B	B-class
R	Rookie
G	Guest

== Race calendar and results ==
Round		Circuit	Date	Pole position	Fastest lap	Winning driver	Winning team	B-class winner
1	R1	(Germany) Motorsport Arena Oschersleben, Saxony-Anhalt	16 April	(Germany) Sven Müller	(Germany) Sven Müller	(Germany) Sven Müller	(Germany) Konrad Motorsport	(Germany) Wolfgang Triller
1	R2	(Germany) Motorsport Arena Oschersleben, Saxony-Anhalt	17 April	(Germany) Sven Müller	(Germany) Christian Engelhart	(Germany) Sven Müller	(Germany) Konrad Motorsport	(Germany) Wolfgang Triller
2	R1	(Germany) Hockenheimring, Baden-Württemberg	7 May	(Germany) Christian Engelhart	(Switzerland) Jeffrey Schmidt	(Germany) Sven Müller	(Germany) Konrad Motorsport	(Germany) Wolfgang Triller
2	R2	(Germany) Hockenheimring, Baden-Württemberg	8 May	(Germany) Christian Engelhart	(Germany) Christian Engelhart	(Switzerland) Jeffrey Schmidt	(Austria) Team Lechner Huber Racing	(Germany) Wolfgang Triller
3	R1	(Austria) Red Bull Ring, Spielberg	21 May	(Germany) Sven Müller	(Germany) Sven Müller	(Germany) Christian Engelhart	(Germany) MRS GT-Racing	(Germany) Wolfgang Triller
3	R2	(Austria) Red Bull Ring, Spielberg	22 May	(Italy) Matteo Cairoli	(Germany) Sven Müller	(Germany) Sven Müller	(Germany) Konrad Motorsport	(Germany) Wolfgang Triller
4	R1	(Germany) Lausitzring, Brandenburg	4 June	(Germany) Sven Müller	(Germany) Sven Müller	(Germany) Sven Müller	(Germany) Konrad Motorsport	(Peru) Ricardo Flores Ramirez
4	R2	(Germany) Lausitzring, Brandenburg	5 June	(Germany) Sven Müller	(Germany) Sven Müller	(Germany) Sven Müller	(Germany) Konrad Motorsport	(Netherlands) Wolf Nathan
5	R1	(Germany) Norisring, Nuremberg	25 June	(Germany) Sven Müller	(Germany) Sven Müller	(Germany) Sven Müller	(Germany) Konrad Motorsport	(Germany) Wolfgang Triller
5	R2	(Germany) Norisring, Nuremberg	26 June	(Germany) Sven Müller	(Germany) Sven Müller	(Germany) Sven Müller	(Germany) Konrad Motorsport	(Peru) Ricardo Flores Ramirez
6	R1	(Netherlands) Circuit Park Zandvoort, North Holland	16 July	(Switzerland) Jeffrey Schmidt	(Germany) Sven Müller	(Germany) Sven Müller	(Germany) Konrad Motorsport	(Germany) Wolfgang Triller
6	R2	(Netherlands) Circuit Park Zandvoort, North Holland	17 July	(Switzerland) Jeffrey Schmidt	(Switzerland) Jeffrey Schmidt	(Germany) Sven Müller	(Germany) Konrad Motorsport	(Germany) Wolfgang Triller
7	R1	(Germany) Nürburgring, Rhineland-Palatinate	10 September	(Germany) Michael Ammermüller (Note: Originally scored by Sven Müller, However, he was the last on the grid by weight violations.)	(Germany) Michael Ammermüller	(Germany) Michael Ammermüller	(Germany) KÜS Team 75 Bernhard	(Netherlands) Wolf Nathan
7	R2	(Germany) Nürburgring, Rhineland-Palatinate	11 September	(Switzerland) Jeffrey Schmidt	(United Kingdom) Nick Yelloly	(Germany) Michael Ammermüller	(Germany) KÜS Team 75 Bernhard	(Germany) Wolfgang Triller
8	R1	(Germany) Hockenheimring, Baden-Württemberg	15 October	(Germany) Sven Müller	(Germany) Sven Müller	(Switzerland) Jeffrey Schmidt	(Austria) Team Lechner Huber Racing	(Germany) Wolfgang Triller
8	R2	(Germany) Hockenheimring, Baden-Württemberg	16 October	(Germany) Sven Müller	(Germany) Sven Müller	(Germany) Christian Engelhart	(Germany) MRS GT-Racing	(Germany) Wolfgang Triller
