= Kelvin van der Linde =

South African-German racing driver (born 1996)

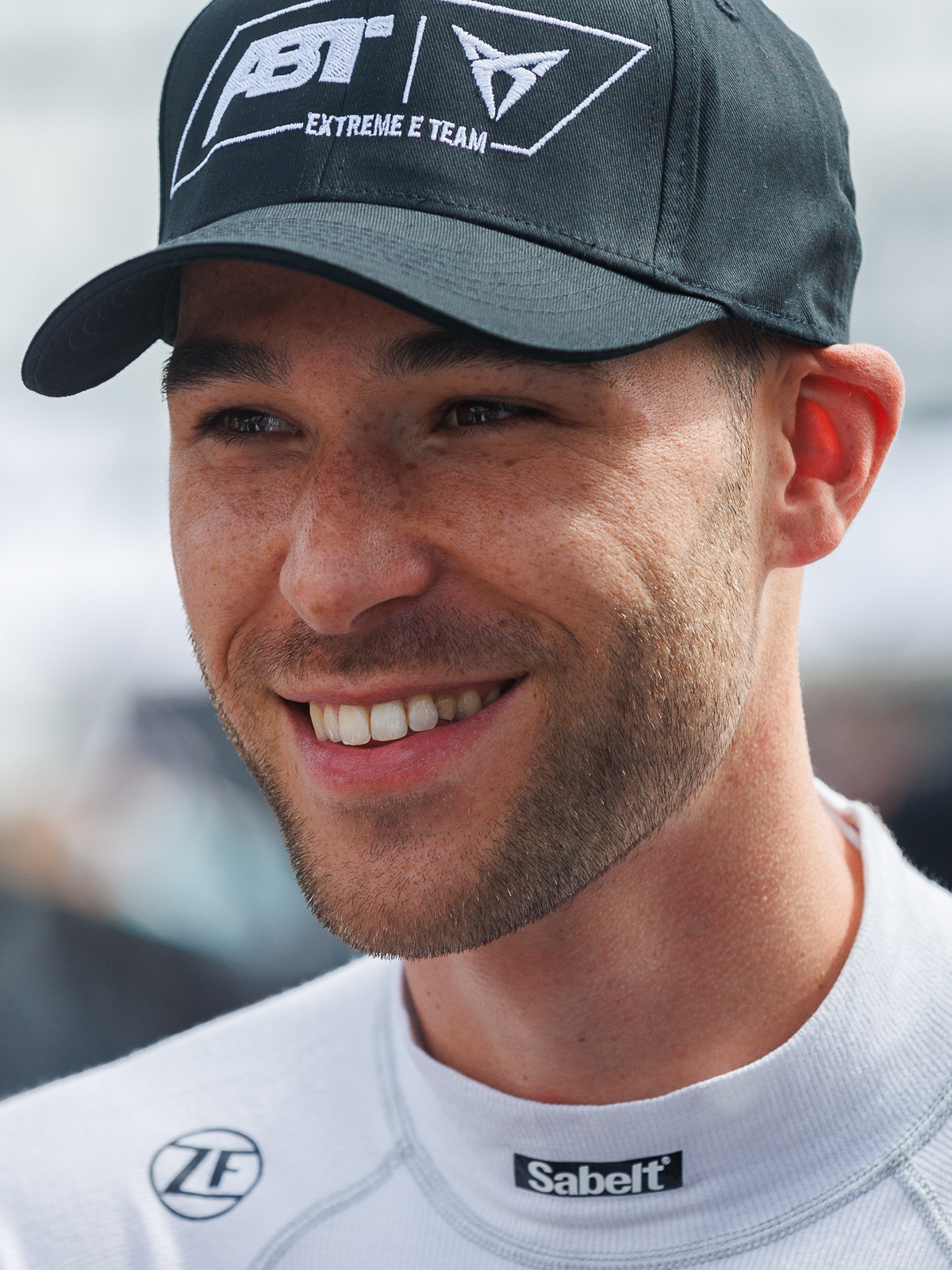
- Van der Linde in 2024
- Nationality: (South Africa) South African
- Born: 20 June 1996 (age 30) Johannesburg, South Africa
- Relatives: Etienne van der Linde (uncle); Sheldon van der Linde (brother)

Formula E career
- Debut season: 2022–23
- Current team: BMW Motorsport
- Categorisation: FIA Silver (2014); FIA Gold (2015–2019); FIA Platinum (2020–)
- Car number: 51
- Starts: 5
- Wins: 0
- Poles: 0
- Fastest laps: 0
- Best finish: 11th in 2023-24 Formula E season

Previous series
- 2014–20 2015 2014 2013 2011–2012 2006–2010: ADAC GT Masters; TCR International Series; Blancpain Sprint Series; Volkswagen Scirocco R-Cup; Volkswagen Cup South Africa; Karting

Championship titles
- 2025 2025 2014, 2019 2013 2011–2012 2008, 2010: Intercontinental GT Challenge; GT World Challenge Europe Sprint Cup; ADAC GT Masters; Volkswagen Scirocco R-Cup; Volkswagen Cup South Africa; South African Karting Championship

Kelvin van der Linde (born 20 June 1996), also known by his initials KVDL, is a South African racing driver for BMW Motorsport. He previously drove for Audi.

Van der Linde is a two-time ADAC GT Masters champion (2014 and 2019) and three-time Nürburgring 24 Hours winner (2017, 2022 and 2025). He made his DTM debut with Audi in 2021, placing third after a clash with Liam Lawson in the final race. He was DTM runner-up in 2024 for Abt Sportsline. Van der Linde moved to BMW in 2025, and won both the GT World Challenge Europe and Intercontinental GT Challenge titles.

Van der Linde also competed in Formula E as a substitute driver for ABT Cupra in 2023 and 2024. He is the older brother of Sheldon van der Linde.

== Racing career ==
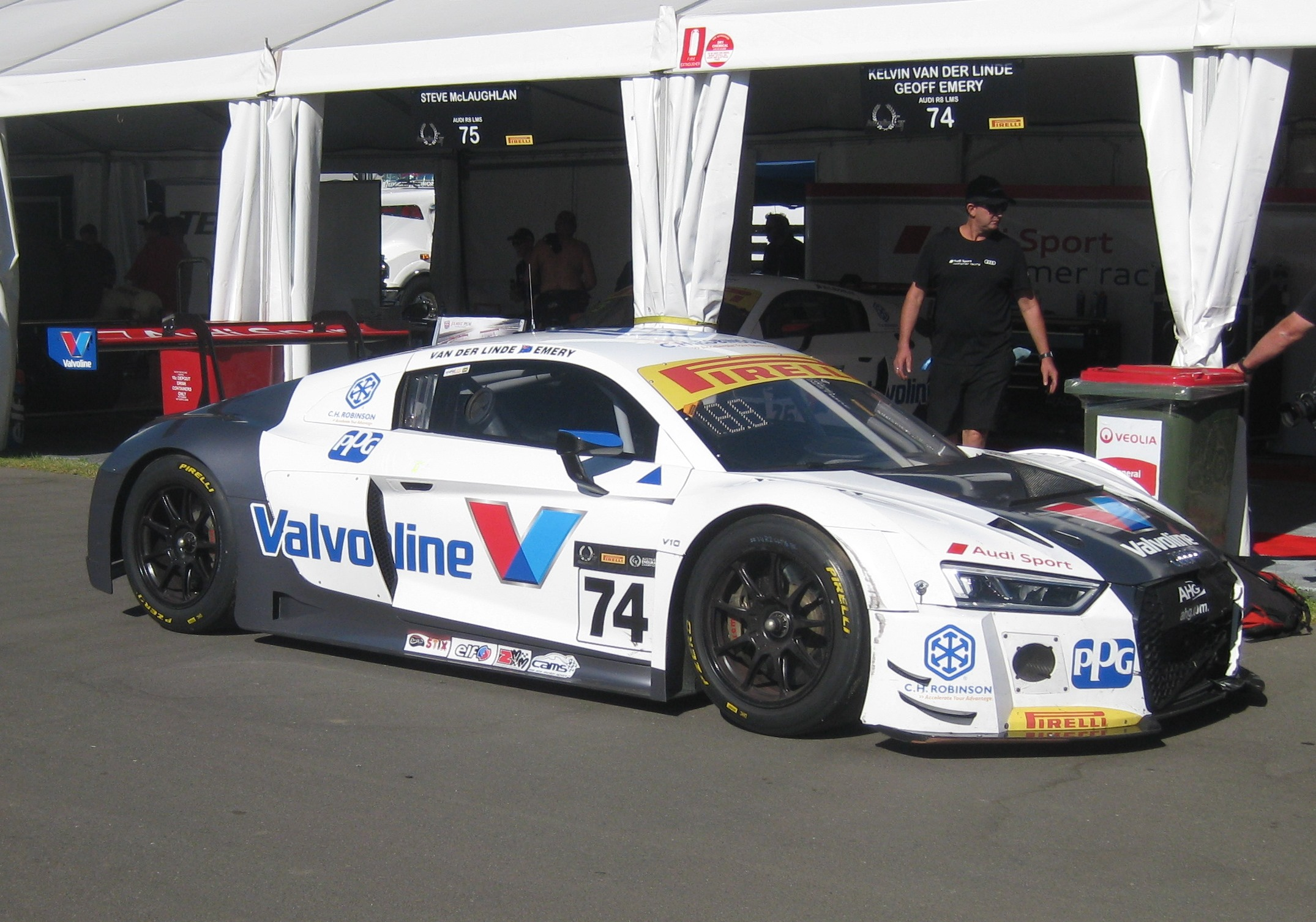
van der Linde placed fourth in the 2017 Australian GT Championship driving an Audi R8 LMS

Van Der Linde, a South African, started his career in racing in kart racing at the age of eight in 2005.

In 2011, van der Linde became the youngest driver to compete in a National South African Circuit event at the age of 14 and also South Africa's youngest National Champion at the age of 16 in 2012.

In 2013, van der Linde won the International Championship. At the age of 17, van der Linde became the youngest ever winner of the Volkswagen Scirocco R-Cup and became a Volkswagen-supported junior driver for the 2014 season. He became the youngest ADAC GT Masters champion at the age of 18 driving an Audi R8 LMS Ultra.

In 2015, van der Linde was promoted to Audi factory driver, winning the 2017 24 Hours of Nürburgring and Suzuka 10 Hours.

=== 2021 ===
In 2021, van der Linde competed in the 2021 Deutsche Tourenwagen Masters (DTM) for Abt Sportsline. He won four races and finished third in the drivers' championship. Going into the final round of the season, he was fighting for the drivers' championship title with Liam Lawson and Maximilian Götz.

During both of the final races of the Championship at the Norisring, van der Linde had similar incidents with Lawson. In the first race, van der Linde dived down the inside of Lawson, with Lawson finished in third. In the second race the consequences were much more serious; Lawson's car was damaged in a first-lap collision with van der Linde, who again dived down the inside of Lawson, taking Lawson out of contention for the title as he finished 18th. van der Linde was then given a five-second time penalty as a result. Towards the end of the race, van der Linde suffered a puncture in a battle with Götz and lost his chances to win the title, which eventually went to Götz after Mercedes issued team orders to the cars ahead of the latter to guarantee he finished in first.

=== 2022 ===
Days before the final round of the 2021 DTM season, Abt Sportsline confirmed van der Linde as their driver for the 2022 season. After finishing ninth in points in 2022, van der Linde returned to the team for 2023.

== Formula E ==
=== ABT CUPRA Formula E Team (2023–2024) ===
==== 2022–23 season ====
After Robin Frijns sustained a hand injury at the 2023 Mexico City ePrix, van der Linde was called upon to replace him at ABT Cupra for the rounds at Diriyah. In his first weekend in single-seater racing, he managed to finish 16th during the first race and 18th on Saturday, which he stated gave him a base to build upon for the following event.

==== 2023–24 season ====
As a reserve driver of ABT Cupra, van der Linde returned for the 2024 Berlin ePrix, replacing Nico Müller who missed the event due to clashing commitments in the FIA World Endurance Championship.

== Personal life ==
Kelvin is the older brother of Sheldon van der Linde, a fellow BMW factory driver and 2022 DTM champion. Together, they won the 2025 Bathurst 12 Hour. Their uncle Etienne van der Linde was also a racing driver.

In 2022, van der Linde initiated the process for acquiring German citizenship after living in Kempten, Germany since 2014. In early 2024, the process was completed.

== Racing record ==
=== Racing career summary ===
Season	Series	Team	Races	Wins	Poles	F/Laps	Podiums	Points	Position
2011	Engen Volkswagen Cup	Ferodo Racing	10	0	0	0	1	?	**3rd**
2011	Volkswagen Challenge South Africa	Ferodo Racing	16	12	16	15	12	152	**1st**
2011	Volkswagen Challenge South Africa	Autoquip	16	12	16	15	12	152	**1st**
2012	Volkswagen Cup South Africa	Ferodo Racing	20	7	?	?	15	429	**1st**
2013	Volkswagen Scirocco R-Cup	N/A	9	5	2	4	6	348	**1st**
2014	ADAC GT Masters	Prosperia C. Abt Racing	16	3	4	0	9	214	**1st**
2014	Blancpain Sprint Series	Prosperia Abt Racing	2	0	0	0	0	0	NC
2015	ADAC GT Masters	C. Abt Racing	16	1	0	0	3	81	14th
2015	TCR International Series	Liqui Moly Team Engstler	2	0	0	0	0	13	21st
2015	Blancpain Endurance Series - Pro	Belgian Audi Club Team WRT	1	0	0	0	0	0	NC
2016	ADAC GT Masters	Car Collection Motorsport	10	0	0	0	0	1	54th
2016	24 Hours of Nürburgring - SP6	Prosport-Performance GmbH	1	0	0	0	0	N/A	DNF
2017	ADAC GT Masters	Aust Motorsport	14	1	0	0	2	107	5th
2017	Australian GT Championship	JAMEC PEM Racing	12	2	0	0	5	516	4th
2017	Intercontinental GT Challenge	Audi Sport Team Magnus	2	1	0	0	1	27	5th
2017	Intercontinental GT Challenge	Audi Sport Team ISR	2	1	0	0	1	27	5th
2017	Blancpain GT Series Endurance Cup	Audi Sport Team ISR	4	0	0	0	0	5	33rd
2017	24H Series - A6	Car Collection Motorsport							
2017	24 Hours of Nürburgring . SP9	Audi Sport Team Land	1	1	0	0	1	N/A	**1st**
2018	ADAC GT Masters	Montaplast by Land-Motorsport	14	2	0	0	6	136	**2nd**
2018	IMSA SportsCar Championship - GTD	Montaplast by Land-Motorsport	1	0	0	0	1	24	53rd
2018	Intercontinental GT Challenge	Audi Sport Team MPC	3	1	2	1	2	40	6th
2018	Intercontinental GT Challenge	Audi Sport Team Absolute Racing	3	1	2	1	2	40	6th
2018	Intercontinental GT Challenge	Audi Sport Team Land	3	1	2	1	2	40	6th
2018	Blancpain GT Series Endurance Cup	Attempto Racing	5	0	0	0	1	36	8th
2018	Blancpain GT Series Endurance Cup	Montaplast by Land-Motorsport	5	0	0	0	1	36	8th
2018	Blancpain GT Series Sprint Cup	Attempto Racing	10	1	0	1	3	65	**3rd**
2018	Stock Car Brasil	Blau Motorsport	3	0	0	0	1	0	NC†
2018	24 Hours of Nürburgring - SP9	Audi Sport Team Land	1	0	0	0	0	N/A	5th
2019	ADAC GT Masters	HCB-Rutronik Racing	14	3	3	1	7	205	**1st**
2019	Intercontinental GT Challenge	Audi Sport Team Valvoline	4	1	0	0	1	32	13th
2019	Intercontinental GT Challenge	Audi Sport Team Land	4	1	0	0	1	32	13th
2019	Intercontinental GT Challenge	Audi Sport Team WRT	4	1	0	0	1	32	13th
2019	Blancpain GT Series Endurance Cup	Attempto Racing	4	0	0	0	0	10	24th
2019	Blancpain GT World Challenge Europe	Attempto Racing	10	0	0	1	0	24.5	10th
2019	24H GT Series - A6	Attempto Racing	1	0	0	0	0	0	NC†
2019	IMSA SportsCar Championship - GTD	Audi Sport Team WRT Speedstar	1	0	0	0	1	30	47th
2019	24 Hours of Nürburgring - SP9	Audi Sport Team Land	1	0	0	0	0	N/A	DNF
2019	FIA GT World Cup	Audi Sport Team Rutronik	1	0	0	0	0	N/A	10th
2019–20	Formula E	Audi Sport ABT Schaeffler	Test driver						
2020	ADAC GT Masters	Rutronik Racing	13	1	0	0	4	160	4th
2020	GT World Challenge Europe Endurance Cup	Belgian Audi Club Team WRT	4	1	0	0	1	52	4th
2020	GT World Challenge Europe Sprint Cup	Belgian Audi Club Team WRT	10	1	0	1	2	66	4th
2020	24H GT Series - GT3	Belgian Audi Club Team WRT	1	0	0	0	0	0	NC†
2020	Intercontinental GT Challenge	Audi Sport Team Valvoline	1	0	0	1	0	4	19th
2020	Intercontinental GT Challenge	Audi Sport Team WRT	2	0	0	0	0	4	19th
2020	24 Hours of Nürburgring - SP9	Audi Sport Team Land	1	0	0	0	0	N/A	6th
2021	Deutsche Tourenwagen Masters	Team Abt Sportsline	16	4	5	2	5	208	**3rd**
2021	Asian Le Mans Series - LMP2	Phoenix Racing	2	0	0	0	1	27	9th
2021	GT World Challenge Europe Endurance Cup	Team WRT	3	0	0	0	2	56	5th
2021	GT World Challenge Europe Sprint Cup	Team WRT	4	0	0	0	1	9.5	22nd
2021	24H GT Series - GT3 Pro	Team WRT	1	0	0	0	1	26	NC
2021	Intercontinental GT Challenge	Audi Sport Team WRT	1	0	0	0	1	33	7th
2021	Intercontinental GT Challenge	Audi Sport Team Saintéloc Racing	1	0	0	0	1	33	7th
2021	24 Hours of Nürburgring - SP9	Audi Sport Team Land	1	0	0	0	0	N/A	DNF
2022	Deutsche Tourenwagen Masters	Team Abt Sportsline	16	0	1	1	1	90	9th
2022	GT World Challenge Europe Endurance Cup	Belgian Audi Club Team WRT	4	1	2	0	1	27	17th
2022	Intercontinental GT Challenge	Audi Sport Team Valvoline	1	0	0	0	0	12	16th
2022	Intercontinental GT Challenge	Audi Sport Team WRT	1	0	0	0	0	12	16th
2022	Intercontinental GT Challenge	Audi Sport Team Tresor	1	0	0	0	0	12	16th
2022	24 Hours of Nürburgring - SP9	Audi Sport Team Phoenix	1	1	0	0	1	N/A	**1st**
2022–23	Formula E	ABT CUPRA Formula E Team	3	0	0	0	0	0	24th
2023	Deutsche Tourenwagen Masters	Abt Sportsline	16	1	0	1	2	119	8th
2023	GT World Challenge Europe Endurance Cup	Scherer Sport PHX	1	0	0	0	1	24	12th
2023	24 Hours of Nürburgring - SP9	ABT Sportsline	1	0	0	0	0	N/A	9th
2023–24	Formula E	ABT CUPRA Formula E Team	2	0	0	0	0	0	25th
2024	Deutsche Tourenwagen Masters	Abt Sportsline	16	3	3	3	6	221	**2nd**
2024	Nürburgring Langstrecken-Serie - SP9	Red Bull Team ABT	4	0	0	0	1	*	*
2024	24 Hours of Nürburgring - SP9	Red Bull Team ABT	1	0	0	0	0	N/A	5th
2024	FIA World Endurance Championship - LMGT3	Akkodis ASP Team	6	0	0	0	0	18	23rd
2025	FIA World Endurance Championship - LMGT3	Team WRT	8	0	1	0	2	52	8th
2025	GT World Challenge Europe Endurance Cup	Team WRT	5	1	1	1	1	63	**3rd**
2025	GT World Challenge Europe Sprint Cup	Team WRT	10	2	0	0	6	88.5	**1st**
2025	IMSA SportsCar Championship - GTD Pro	Paul Miller Racing	1	0	0	1	0	298	28th
2025	Intercontinental GT Challenge	Team WRT	4	3	1	0	3	110	**1st**
2025	Intercontinental GT Challenge	Rowe Racing	1	1	0	0	1	110	**1st**
2025	Nürburgring Langstrecken-Serie - SP9	Rowe Racing							
2025	24 Hours of Nürburgring - SP9	Rowe Racing	1	1	0	0	1	N/A	**1st**
2025–26	24H Series Middle East - GT3	Team WRT							
2026	Deutsche Tourenwagen Masters	Schubert Motorsport	15	1	2	0	1	96	14th
2026	Nürburgring Langstrecken-Serie - SP9	Rowe Racing							
2026	24 Hours of Nürburgring - SP9	Rowe Racing	1	0	0	0	0	N/A	DNF
2026	GT World Challenge Europe Endurance Cup	Team WRT	5	0	0	0	1	42	4th
2026	GT World Challenge Europe Sprint Cup	Team WRT	10	2	0	1	3	55	5th
2026	FIA GT World Cup	Team WRT	1	1	0	0	1	N/A	**1st**

^{†} As van der Linde was a guest driver, he was ineligible for points.
^{*} Season still in progress.

=== Complete ADAC GT Masters results ===
(key) (Races in bold indicate pole position) (Races in italics indicate fastest lap)

Year	Team	Car	1	2	3	4	5	6	7	8	9	10	11	12	13	14	15	16	DC	Points
2014	Prosperia C. Abt Racing	Audi R8 LMS ultra	OSC; 1; 2	OSC; 2; 1	ZAN; 1; 3	ZAN; 2; 2	LAU; 1; 7	LAU; 2; 2	RBR; 1; 10	RBR; 2; 2	SLO; 1; 6	SLO; 2; 10	NÜR; 1; 6	NÜR; 2; 2	SAC; 1; 1	SAC; 2; 1	HOC; 1; 10	HOC; 2; 6	**1st**	**214**
2015	C. Abt Racing	Audi R8 LMS ultra	OSC; 1; 17	OSC; 2; 6	RBR; 1; 10	RBR; 2; 17	SPA; 1 Ret	SPA; 2; 11	LAU; 1 Ret	LAU; 2; 12	NÜR; 1; 3	NÜR; 2 Ret	SAC; 1 Ret	SAC; 2; 1	ZAN; 1 Ret	ZAN; 2; 7	HOC; 1; 3	HOC; 2; 7	14th	81
2016	Car Collection Motorsport	Audi R8 LMS	OSC; 1; 27	OSC; 2; 10	SAC; 1; 24	SAC; 2; 20	LAU; 1; 29	LAU; 2 Ret	RBR; 1 Ret	RBR; 2; 16	NÜR; 1; 12	NÜR; 2; 24	ZAN; 1	ZAN; 2	HOC; 1	HOC; 2			54th	1
2017	Aust Motorsport	Audi R8 LMS	OSC; 1; 4	OSC; 2; 9	LAU; 1; 6	LAU; 2; 7	RBR; 1; 9	RBR; 2; 21	ZAN; 1; 2	ZAN; 2 Ret	NÜR; 1; 6	NÜR; 2; 1	SAC; 1; 4	SAC; 2; 6	HOC; 1; 7	HOC; 2; 20			5th	107
2018	Montaplast by Land-Motorsport	Audi R8 LMS	OSC; 1; 2	OSC; 2 Ret	MST; 1; 9	MST; 2; 8	RBR; 1; 5	RBR; 2; 13	NÜR; 1 Ret	NÜR; 2; 10	ZAN; 1; 2	ZAN; 2; 11	SAC; 1; 1	SAC; 2; 2	HOC; 1; 3	HOC; 2; 1			**2nd**	**136**
2019	HCB-Rutronik Racing	Audi R8 LMS Evo	OSC; 1; 2	OSC; 2; 4	**MST**; **1**; 1	MST; 2; 4	RBR; 1; 4	RBR; 2; 3	ZAN; 1; 17	ZAN; 2; 9	NÜR; 1; 3	NÜR; 2; 2	HOC; 1; 9	**HOC**; **2**; 1	SAC; 1; 19	**SAC**; **2**; 1			**1st**	**205**
2020	Rutronik Racing	Audi R8 LMS Evo	LAU; 1; 6	LAU; 2; 5	NÜR; 1; 3	**NÜR**; **2**; 10	HOC; 1; 2	HOC; 2; 1	SAC; 1; 7	SAC; 2; 3	RBR; 1; 8	RBR; 2; 8	LAU; 1; 5	LAU; 2; 6	OSC; 1; 6	OSC; 2 Ret			4th	160

=== Complete GT World Challenge Europe results ===
==== GT World Challenge Europe Sprint Cup ====
(key) (Races in bold indicate pole position; races in italics indicate fastest lap)

Year	Team	Car	Class	1	2	3	4	5	6	7	8	9	10	11	12	13	14	Pos.	Points
2014	Prosperia ABT Racing	Audi R8 LMS ultra	Pro	NOG; QR	NOG; CR	BRH; QR	BRH; CR	ZAN; QR	ZAN; CR	SVK; QR	SVK; CR	ALG; QR	ALG; CR	ZOL; QR	ZOL; CR	BAK; QR; Ret	BAK; CR; 15	NC	0
2018	Attempto Racing	Audi R8 LMS	Pro	ZOL; 1; 4	ZOL; 2; 1	BRH; 1; 8	BRH; 2; 3	MIS; 1 Ret	MIS; 2; 4	HUN; 1; 10	HUN; 2; 3	NÜR; 1; 6	NÜR; 2; 4					3rd	65
2019	Attempto Racing	Audi R8 LMS Evo	Pro	BRH; 1; 5	BRH; 2; 4	MIS; 1; 7	MIS; 2; 14	ZAN; 1; 27	ZAN; 2; 24	NÜR; 1; 28	NÜR; 2; 12	HUN; 1; 4	HUN; 2; 10					10th	24.5
2020	Belgian Audi Club Team WRT	Audi R8 LMS Evo	Pro	MIS; 1; 2	MIS; 2; 5	MIS; 3; 7	MAG; 1; 5	MAG; 2; 6	ZAN; 1; 1	ZAN; 2; 11	CAT; 1; 7	CAT; 2; 4	CAT; 3; 4					4th	66
2021	ROFGO Racing with Team WRT	Audi R8 LMS Evo	Pro	MAG; 1; 11	MAG; 2 Ret	ZAN; 1	ZAN; 2	MIS; 1; 23	MIS; 2; 3	BRH; 1	BRH; 2	VAL; 1	VAL; 2					22nd	9.5
2025	Team WRT	BMW M4 GT3 Evo	Pro	BRH; 1; 7	BRH; 2; 2	ZAN; 1; 5	ZAN; 2; 1	MIS; 1; 3	MIS; 2; 5	MAG; 1; 3	MAG; 2; 3	VAL; 1 Ret	VAL; 2; 1					1st	88.5
2026	Team WRT	BMW M4 GT3 Evo	Pro	BRH; 1; 3	BRH; 2; 6	MIS; 1; 1	MIS; 2; 1	MAG; 1; 7	MAG; 2 Ret	ZAN; 1 Ret	ZAN; 2; 15	CAT; 1; 10	CAT; 2; 6					5th	55

==== GT World Challenge Europe Endurance Cup ====
(key) (Races in bold indicate pole position; races in italics indicate fastest lap)

Year	Team	Car	Class	1	2	3	4	5	6	7	Pos.	Points
2015	Belgian Audi Club Team WRT	Audi R8 LMS	Pro	MNZ; Ret	SIL	LEC	SPA; 6H	SPA; 12H	SPA; 24H	NÜR	NC	0
2017	Audi Sport Team ISR	Audi R8 LMS	Pro	MNZ	SIL	LEC; 29	SPA; 6H; 8	SPA; 12H; 9	SPA; 24H; 9	CAT	33th	5
2018	Attempto Racing	Audi R8 LMS	Pro	MNZ; 6	SIL; 19	LEC; Ret				CAT; DNS	8th	36
2018	Montaplast by Land-Motorsport	Audi R8 LMS	Pro				SPA; 6H; 1	SPA; 12H; 9	SPA; 24H; 3		8th	36
2019	Attempto Racing	Audi R8 LMS Evo	Pro	MNZ; 7	SIL; Ret	LEC; 8	SPA; 6H; 31	SPA; 12H; 30	SPA; 24H; 30	CAT	24th	10
2020	Belgian Audi Club Team WRT	Audi R8 LMS Evo	Pro	IMO; 1	NÜR; 4	SPA; 6H; 24	SPA; 12H; 49	SPA; 24H; Ret	LEC; 5		4th	52
2021	Team WRT	Audi R8 LMS Evo	Pro	MON; Ret	LEC; 2	SPA; 6H; 5	SPA; 12H; 2	SPA; 24H; 2	NÜR	CAT	5th	56
2022	Team WRT	Audi R8 LMS Evo II	Pro	**IMO**; 1	LEC; 41	SPA; 6H; 14	SPA; 12H; 14	SPA; 24H; Ret	**HOC**; Ret	CAT	17th	27
2023	Scherer Sport PHX	Audi R8 LMS Evo II	Pro	MNZ	LEC	SPA; 6H; 2	SPA; 12H; 12	SPA; 24H; 3	NÜR	CAT	12th	24
2025	Team WRT	BMW M4 GT3 Evo	Pro	LEC; 1	MNZ; 5	SPA; 6H; 7	SPA; 12H; 9	SPA; 24H; 7	**NÜR**; 10	CAT; 6	3rd	63
2026	Team WRT	BMW M4 GT3 Evo	Pro	LEC; 4	MNZ; 30	SPA; 6H; 2	SPA; 12H; 24	SPA; 24H; 12	NÜR; 2	ALG; 29	4th	42

=== Complete TCR International Series results ===
(key) (Races in bold indicate pole position) (Races in italics indicate fastest lap)

Year	Team	Car	1	2	3	4	5	6	7	8	9	10	11	12	13	14	15	16	17	18	19	20	21	22	DC	Points
2015	Liqui Moly Team Engstler	Audi TT Cup	SEP; 1	SEP; 2	SHA; 1	SHA; 2	VAL; 1	VAL; 2	ALG; 1; 4	ALG; 2; 12†	MNZ; 1	MNZ; 2	SAL; 1	SAL; 2	SOC; 1	SOC; 2	RBR; 1	RBR; 2	MRN; 1	MRN; 2	CHA; 1	CHA; 2	MAC; 1	MAC; 2	21st	13

^{†} Driver did not finish the race, but was classified as he completed over 90% of the race distance.

=== Complete 24 Hours of Nürburgring results ===
Year	Team	Co-Drivers	Car	Class	Laps	Ovr. Pos.	Class Pos.
2016	(Germany) Prosport-Performance GmbH	(Germany) Fidel Leib (Sweden) Jonas Carlsson (Germany) Thomas Bolz	Porsche Cayman Pro4	SP6	4	DNF	DNF
2017	(Germany) Audi Sport Team Land / Land-Motorsport	(United States) Connor De Phillippi (Germany) Christopher Mies (Germany) Markus Winkelhock	Audi R8 LMS	SP9	158	**1st**	**1st**
2018	(Germany) Audi Sport Team Land	(Germany) Christopher Mies (Germany) René Rast (South Africa) Sheldon van der Linde	Audi R8 LMS	SP9	133	6th	5th
2019	(Germany) Audi Sport Team Land	(Germany) Christopher Mies (Germany) René Rast (Germany) Christopher Haase	Audi R8 LMS Evo	SP9	139	DNF	DNF
2020	(Germany) Audi Sport Team Land	(Italy) Mattia Drudi (Germany) Christopher Mies (Germany) René Rast	Audi R8 LMS Evo	SP9	85	6th	6th
2021	(Germany) Audi Sport Team Land	(Germany) Christopher Mies (Germany) René Rast (Belgium) Frédéric Vervisch	Audi R8 LMS Evo	SP9	47	DNF	DNF
2022	(Germany) Audi Sport Team Phoenix	(Netherlands) Robin Frijns (Belgium) Dries Vanthoor (Belgium) Frédéric Vervisch	Audi R8 LMS Evo II	SP9	159	**1st**	**1st**
2023	(Germany) ABT Sportsline	(Italy) Marco Mapelli (South Africa) Jordan Pepper (Denmark) Nicki Thiim	Lamborghini Huracán GT3 Evo 2	SP9	160	9th	7th
2024	(Germany) Red Bull Team Abt	(Italy) Marco Mapelli (South Africa) Jordan Pepper	Lamborghini Huracán GT3 Evo 2	SP9	50	5th	5th
2025	(Germany) Rowe Racing	(Brazil) Augusto Farfus (Finland) Jesse Krohn (Switzerland) Raffaele Marciello	BMW M4 GT3 Evo	SP9	141	**1st**	**1st**
2026	(Germany) Rowe Racing	(Brazil) Augusto Farfus (Switzerland) Raffaele Marciello (South Africa) Jordan Pepper	BMW M4 GT3 Evo	SP9	49	DNF	DNF

=== Complete Bathurst 12 Hour results ===
Year	Team	Co-Drivers	Car	Class	Laps	Pos.	Class Pos.
2018	(Australia) Melbourne Performance Centre	(Australia) Garth Tander (Belgium) Frédéric Vervisch	Audi R8 LMS	Pro	241	27th	7th
2019	(Australia) Melbourne Performance Centre	(Australia) Garth Tander (Belgium) Frédéric Vervisch	Audi R8 LMS	Pro	181	DNF	DNF
2020	(Australia) Melbourne Performance Centre	(Italy) Mattia Drudi (Germany) Markus Winkelhock	Audi R8 LMS Evo	Pro	308	18th	11th
2022	(Australia) Melbourne Performance Centre	(France) Nathanaël Berthon (Australia) Brad Schumacher	Audi R8 LMS Evo II	Pro-Am	290	4th	4th
2024	(Australia) Melbourne Performance Centre	(Germany) Christopher Haase (Australia) Liam Talbot	Audi R8 LMS Evo II	Pro	275	**3rd**	**3rd**
2025	(Belgium) Team WRT	(South Africa) Sheldon van der Linde (Brazil) Augusto Farfus	BMW M4 GT3	Pro	306	**1st**	**1st**
2026	(Belgium) Team WRT	(South Africa) Jordan Pepper (Belgium) Charles Weerts	BMW M4 GT3 Evo	Pro	262	12th	8th

=== Complete IMSA SportsCar Championship results ===
(key) (Races in bold indicate pole position; results in italics indicate fastest lap)

Year	Entrant	Class	Make	Engine	1	2	3	4	5	6	7	8	9	10	11	Rank	Points
2018	Montaplast by Land-Motorsport	GTD	Audi R8 LMS	Audi DAR 5.2 L V10	DAY; 7	SEB	MOH	DET	WGL	MOS	LIM	ELK	VIR	LGA	PET	53rd	24
2019	Audi Sport Team WRT Speedstar	GTD	Audi R8 LMS Evo	Audi DAR 5.2 L V10	DAY; 3	SEB	MDO	DET	WGL	MOS	LIM	ELK	VIR	LGA	PET	47th	30
2025	Paul Miller Racing	GTD Pro	BMW M4 GT3 Evo	BMW P58 3.0 L Turbo I6	DAY; 4	SEB	LGA	DET	WGL	MOS	ELK	VIR	IMS	PET		28th	298

=== Complete Stock Car Brasil results ===
Year	Team	Car	1	2	3	4	5	6	7	8	9	10	11	12	13	14	15	16	17	18	19	20	21	Rank	Points
2018	Blau Motorsport	Chevrolet Cruze	INT; 1; 3	CUR; 1	CUR; 2	VEL; 1	VEL; 2	LON; 1	LON; 2	SCZ; 1	SCZ; 2	GOI; 1	MOU; 1	MOU; 2	CAS; 1	CAS; 2	VCA; 1	VCA; 2	TAR; 1 Ret	TAR; 2; 19	GOI; 1	GOI; 2	INT; 1	NC†	0†

^{†} As Albuquerque was a guest driver, he was ineligible for points.

=== Complete Asian Le Mans Series results ===
(key) (Races in bold indicate pole position) (Races in italics indicate fastest lap)

Year	Team	Class	Car	Engine	1	2	3	4	Pos.	Points
2021	Phoenix Racing	LMP2	Oreca 07	Gibson GK428 4.2 L V8	DUB; 1; 3	DUB; 2; 3	ABU; 1; 4	ABU; 2; 3	4th	57

=== Complete Deutsche Tourenwagen Masters results ===
(key) (Races in bold indicate pole position) (Races in italics indicate fastest lap)

Year	Team	Car	1	2	3	4	5	6	7	8	9	10	11	12	13	14	15	16	Pos	Points
2021	Abt Sportsline	Audi R8 LMS Evo	MNZ; 1; 4	**MNZ**; **2**; 1^{1}	LAU; 1; 4^{2}	LAU; 2; 3	**ZOL**; **1**; 1^{1}	ZOL; 2; 8	**NÜR**; **1**; 1^{1}	NÜR; 2 Ret	RBR; 1; 5	RBR; 2; 6	ASS; 1; 12	ASS; 2; 4	**HOC**; **1**; 1^{1}	**HOC**; **2**; 10^{1}	NOR; 1; 4^{2}	NOR; 2; 17^{2}	3rd	208
2022	Team Abt Sportsline	Audi R8 LMS Evo II	ALG; 1; 4	ALG; 2; 6	LAU; 1 Ret	LAU; 2; 20	IMO; 1; 5	IMO; 2; 13	**NOR**; **1** Ret^{1}	NOR; 2 Ret	NÜR; 1; 2	NÜR; 2; 4^{2}	SPA; 1; 5	SPA; 2; 14	RBR; 1; 8	RBR; 2 Ret	HOC; 1; 12	HOC; 2; 5	9th	90
2023	Abt Sportsline	Audi R8 LMS Evo II	OSC; 1; 6	OSC; 2 Ret	ZAN; 1; 12	ZAN; 2; 6	NOR; 1; 21	NOR; 2; 5	NÜR; 1; 8	NÜR; 2; 20	LAU; 1; 3	LAU; 2; 8	SAC; 1; 5	SAC; 2; 13	RBR; 1; 1^{2}	RBR; 2 Ret	HOC; 1; 6	HOC; 2; 25	8th	119
2024	Red Bull – Team ABT	Audi R8 LMS Evo II	OSC; 1; 12	OSC; 2; 5	**LAU**; **1**; 1^{1}	LAU; 2; 2	ZAN; 1; 13	ZAN; 2; 3	NOR; 1; 6	NOR; 2; 9	**NÜR**; **1**; 1^{1}	NÜR; 2; 4	SAC; 1; 8	SAC; 2; 2^{2}	RBR; 1; 8	RBR; 2; 5	**HOC**; **1**; 1^{1}	HOC; 2; 12	2nd	221
2026	Schubert Motorsport	BMW M4 GT3 Evo	RBR; 1 DSQ	**RBR**; **2**; 6^{1}	ZAN; 1 Ret	**ZAN**; **2**; 1^{1}	LAU; 1; 10	LAU; 2; 9	NOR; 1 Ret	NOR; 2 DNS	OSC; 1; 7	OSC; 2; 6	NÜR; 1 Ret	NÜR; 2 Ret	SAC; 1; 4	SAC; 2; 18	HOC; 1; 6	HOC; 2; 18	14th	96

=== Complete FIA Formula E World Championship results ===
(key) (Races in bold indicate pole position; races in italics indicate fastest lap)

Year	Team	Chassis	Powertrain	1	2	3	4	5	6	7	8	9	10	11	12	13	14	15	16	Pos	Points
2022–23	ABT CUPRA Formula E Team	Formula E Gen3	Mahindra M9Electro	MEX	DRH; 16	DRH; 18	HYD; Ret	CAP; WD	SAP	BER	BER	MCO	JAK	JAK	POR	RME	RME	LDN	LDN	24th	0
2023–24	ABT CUPRA Formula E Team	Formula E Gen3	Mahindra M10Electro	MEX	DRH	DRH	SAP	TOK	MIS	MIS	MCO	BER; 11	BER; 15	SIC	SIC	POR	POR	LDN	LDN	25th	0

=== Complete FIA World Endurance Championship results ===
(key) (Races in bold indicate pole position) (Races in italics indicate fastest lap)

Year	Entrant	Class	Car	Engine	1	2	3	4	5	6	7	8	Rank	Points
2024	Akkodis ASP Team	LMGT3	Lexus RC F GT3	Lexus 2UR-GSE 5.4 L V8	QAT; Ret	IMO; 14	SPA	LMS; 6	SÃO; WD	COA; 9	FUJ; 11	BHR; Ret	23rd	18
2025	Team WRT	LMGT3	BMW M4 GT3 Evo	BMW P58 3.0 L Turbo I6	QAT; 11	**IMO**; 2	SPA; 9	LMS; Ret	SÃO; 10	COA; 2	FUJ; 4	BHR; 15	8th	52

=== Complete 24 Hours of Le Mans results ===
Year	Team	Co-Drivers	Car	Class	Laps	Pos.	Class Pos.
2024	(France) Akkodis ASP Team	Timur Boguslavskiy (France) Arnold Robin	Lexus RC F GT3	LMGT3	279	34th	7th
2025	(Belgium) Team WRT	(Oman) Ahmad Al Harthy (Italy) Valentino Rossi	BMW M4 GT3 Evo	LMGT3	156	DNF	DNF

Sporting positions
Preceded by Diego Alessi; Daniel Keilwitz	ADAC GT Masters; Champion; 2015; With: René Rast	Succeeded by Sebastian Asch; Luca Ludwig
Preceded by Mathieu Jaminet; Robert Renauer	ADAC GT Masters; Champion; 2019; With: Patric Niederhauser	Succeeded by Michael Ammermüller; Christian Engelhart
Preceded by Lucas Auer; Maro Engel	GT World Challenge Europe Sprint Cup; Champion; 2025; With: Charles Weerts	Succeeded by Incumbent
Preceded by Antonio Fuoco	FIA GT World Cup; Winner; 2026	Succeeded by Incumbent
