= Land-Motorsport =

German sports car racing team

(Germany) Land-Motorsport
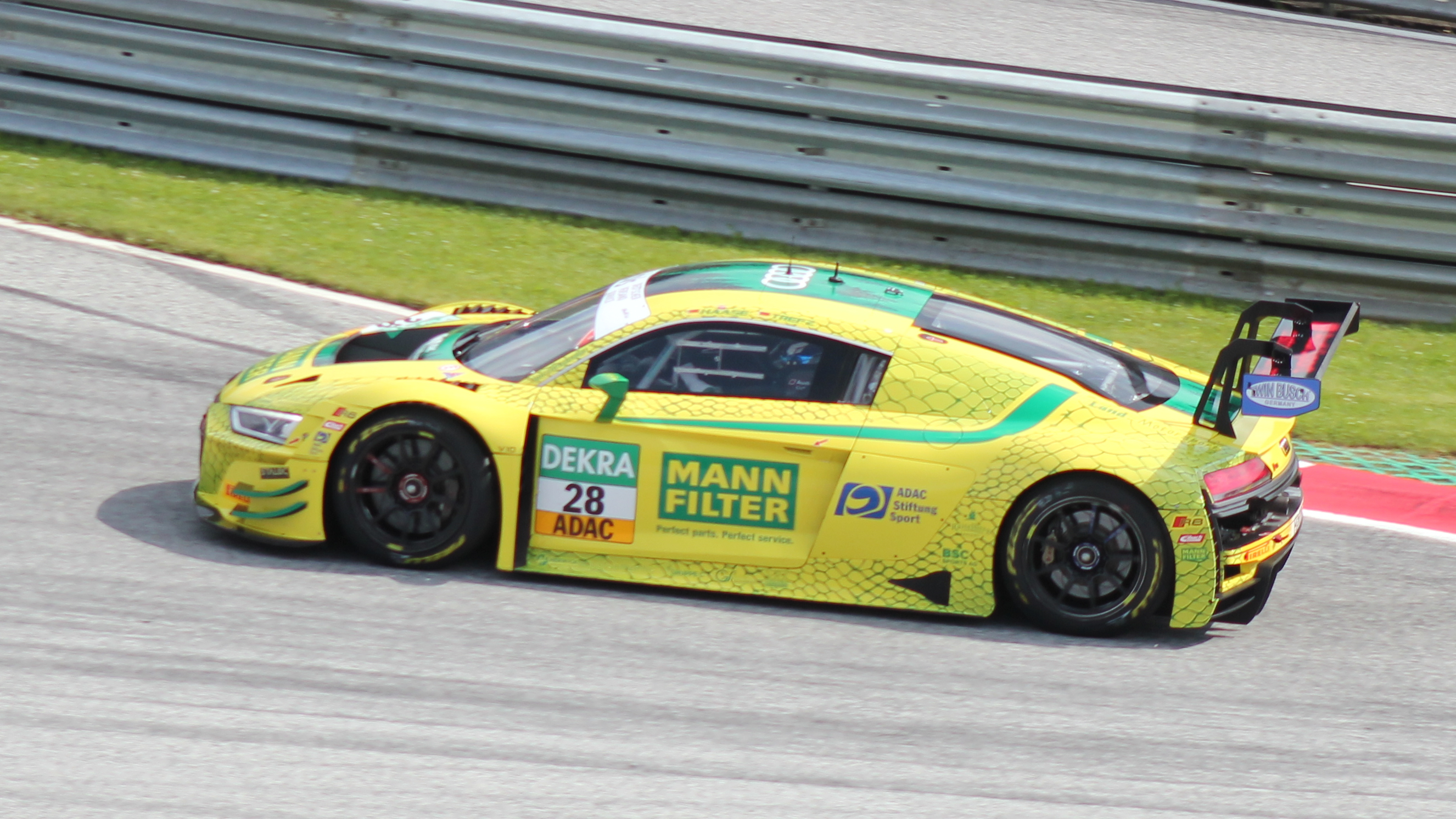
- Founded: 1995
- Founder(s): Wolfgang Land
- Base: Niederdreisbach, Germany
- Team principal(s): Wolfgang Land
- Current series: Deutsche Tourenwagen Masters; Spezial Tourenwagen Trophy
- Former series: 24H Series; ADAC GT Masters; Blancpain GT Series Endurance Cup; Formula BMW ADAC; IMSA WeatherTech SportsCar Championship; Intercontinental GT Challenge; Nürburgring Langstrecken-Serie; Porsche Carrera Cup Benelux; Porsche Carrera Cup Germany; Porsche Supercup
- Current drivers: (Denmark) Bastian Buus
- Teams' Championships: 2016, 2021 GT Masters
- Drivers' Championships: 2016, 2021 GT Masters, 2016, 2018, 2019, 2021 GT Masters Junior
- Website: land-motorsport.de/en/

Land-Motorsport GmbH is a German sports car racing team that currently competes in the Deutsche Tourenwagen Masters. The team was founded by racing driver Wolfgang Land in 1995 in Niederdreisbach, Germany.

== History ==
Land-Motorsport began in Formula BMW ADAC before moving to Porsche Carrera Cup Germany in 1998. Whilst running Porsches, the team claimed two class wins at the 24 Hours of Spa in 2001 and 2003. From 2004 to 2008, Land competed in the VLN, scoring 19 victories in that span. The last major victory for Land with Porsche was the 2009 Dubai 24 Hour, where they took overall honors in a Porsche 997 GT3 Cup.

Land-Motorsport continued to campaign Porsche Cup cars in regional championships until 2016, when the team became backed by Audi Sport. The partnership with the Ingolstadt brand started well, winning the drivers', teams' and juniors' championships in the 2016 ADAC GT Masters courtesy of Christopher Mies and Connor De Phillippi. Further success was had in 2017, with an overall win in the 24 Hours of Nürburgring with Mies, De Phillippi, Kelvin van der Linde and Markus Winkelhock, and a GTD class win at Petit Le Mans. Land helped Audi take the 2018 Intercontinental GT Challenge manufacturers' title by taking victory in the California 8 Hours. The team also won two consecutive GT Masters junior championships for Sheldon van der Linde in 2018 and Max Hofer in 2019.

In 2021, Land-Motorsport again took the drivers', teams' and juniors' championships in the ADAC GT Masters with Mies and Ricardo Feller. A move to the 24H Series in 2023 was highlighted by a class win in the 24 Hours of Barcelona. The team entered the Deutsche Tourenwagen Masters (DTM) for the first time in 2025, dusting off an old Audi R8 LMS Evo II for Feller in a late effort. They took their maiden win at the Red Bull Ring in race 2. Following the conclusion of the season, Land-Motorsport announced they had ended their partnership with Audi after ten years.

In 2026, Land-Motorsport continued on in the DTM, switching to Porsche with Bastian Buus as driver.

== Racing record ==
=== 24 Hours of Nürburgring results ===
Year	Entrant	No.	Car	Drivers	Class	Laps	Pos.	Class Pos.
2005	(Germany) Land-Motorsport Porsche Zentrum Koblenz	40	Porsche 911 GT3-RSR	(Germany) Marc Basseng (Germany) Marc Lieb (Germany) Mike Rockenfeller	A7	76	DNF	DNF
2006	(Germany) Land-Motorsport PZK	36	Porsche GT3	(Germany) Marc Basseng (Germany) Timo Scheider (Germany) Patrick Simon (Germany) Frank Stippler	SP7	133	DNF	DNF
2007	(Germany) Land Motorsport	25	Porsche 911 GT3-RSR	(Germany) Dirk Adorf (Germany) Marc Basseng (Germany) Marc Hennerici (Germany) Frank Stippler	SP7	111	3rd	2nd
2008	(Germany) Land-Motorsport PZ Aschaffenburg	3	Porsche 997 GT3-RSR	(Germany) Marc Basseng (Germany) Patrick Simon (Austria) Johannes Stuck	SP7	91	DNF	DNF
2008	(Germany) Land-Motorsport PZ Aschaffenburg	33	Porsche 997 GT3 Cup	(Ukraine) Valeriy Gorban (Russia) Stanislav Gryazin (Russia) Sergey Matveev (Russia) Ergeny Tsarev	SP7	139	10th	9th
2016	(Germany) Montaplast By Land-Motorsport	28	Audi R8 LMS	(Germany) Marc Basseng (United States) Connor De Phillippi (Germany) Mike Rockenfeller (Germany) Timo Scheider	SP9	67	DNF	DNF
2017	(Germany) Audi Sport Team Land / Land-Motorsport	28	Audi R8 LMS	(United States) Connor De Phillippi (Germany) Christopher Mies (Germany) Christopher Haase (Germany) Pierre Kaffer	SP9	113	DNF	DNF
2017	(Germany) Audi Sport Team Land / Land-Motorsport	29	Audi R8 LMS	(United States) Connor De Phillippi (Germany) Christopher Mies (South Africa) Kelvin van der Linde (Germany) Markus Winkelhock	SP9	158	1st	1st
2018	(Germany) Audi Sport Team Land	1	Audi R8 LMS	(South Africa) Kelvin van der Linde (South Africa) Sheldon van der Linde (Germany) Christopher Mies (Germany) René Rast	SP9	133	6th	5th
2019	(Germany) Audi Sport Team Land	29	Audi R8 LMS Evo	(Germany) Christopher Haase (South Africa) Kelvin van der Linde (Germany) Christopher Mies (Germany) René Rast	SP9 Pro	139	DNF	DNF
2020	(Germany) Audi Sport Team Land	29	Audi R8 LMS Evo	(Italy) Mattia Drudi (South Africa) Kelvin van der Linde (Germany) Christopher Mies (Germany) René Rast	SP9 Pro	85	6th	6th
2021	(Germany) Audi Sport Team Land	29	Audi R8 LMS Evo	(South Africa) Kelvin van der Linde (Germany) Christopher Mies (Germany) René Rast (Belgium) Frédéric Vervisch	SP9	47	DNF	DNF
2023	(Germany) Audi Sport Team Land	39	Audi R8 LMS Evo II	(Germany) Christopher Haase (Germany) Christopher Mies (Switzerland) Patric Niederhauser	SP9 Pro	161	6th	6th

== Current series results ==
=== Deutsche Tourenwagen Masters ===
Year	Car	Drivers	Races	Wins	Poles	F/Laps	Podiums	Points	D.C.	T.C.
2025	Audi R8 LMS Evo II	(Switzerland) Ricardo Feller	16	1	0	0	3	100	11th	8th
2026	Porsche 911 GT3 R (992.2)	(Denmark) Bastian Buus	16	0	1	2	0	66	16th	11th

^{*} Season still in progress.

== Former series results ==
=== ADAC GT Masters ===
(key) (Races in bold indicate pole position) (Races in italics indicate fastest lap)

Year	Entrant	Car	No.	Drivers	1	2	3	4	5	6	7	8	9	10	11	12	13	14	Pos.	Pts.
2016	(Germany) Montaplast by Land-Motorsport	Audi R8 LMS	28	(Netherlands) Peter Hoevenaars (Germany) Marc Basseng (Belgium) Frédéric Vervisch (Germany) Christopher Haase (Monaco) Stéphane Ortelli	OSC; 1; 3	OSC; 2; 21	SAC; 1; 14	SAC; 2; 22	LAU; 1; 26	LAU; 2; 18	RBR; 1 Ret	RBR; 2; 23	NÜR; 1; 22	NÜR; 2; 6	ZAN; 1; 5	ZAN; 2; 7	HOC; 1; 4	HOC; 2; 14	15th	51
2016	(Germany) Montaplast by Land-Motorsport	Audi R8 LMS	29	(Germany) Christopher Mies (United States) Connor De Phillippi	**OSC**; **1**; 2	OSC; 2; 2	SAC; 1; 2	SAC; 2; 7	LAU; 1; 6	LAU; 2; 3	RBR; 1 Ret	RBR; 2; 6	NÜR; 1; 18	NÜR; 2; 1	**ZAN**; **1**; 2	ZAN; 2; 4	**HOC**; **1**; 2	HOC; 2; 8	1st	168
2017	(Germany) Montaplast by Land-Motorsport	Audi R8 LMS	1	(Germany) Christopher Mies (United States) Connor De Phillippi	OSC; 1; 3	OSC; 2; 10	LAU; 1; 18	LAU; 2; 2	RBR; 1; 8	RBR; 2 Ret	ZAN; 1; 12	ZAN; 2; 1	NÜR; 1; 17	NÜR; 2; 6	**SAC**; **1**; 1	SAC; 2; 9	HOC; 1; 2	HOC; 2; 8	3rd	120
2017	(Germany) Montaplast by Land-Motorsport	Audi R8 LMS	2	(Germany) Christopher Haase (Switzerland) Jeffrey Schmidt	OSC; 1; 5	OSC; 2; 5	LAU; 1; 13	LAU; 2; 11	RBR; 1; 20	RBR; 2 Ret	ZAN; 1 DNS	ZAN; 2; 2	NÜR; 1; 8	NÜR; 2; 3	SAC; 1; 11	SAC; 2; 3	HOC; 1; 8	HOC; 2; 3	9th	91
2018	(Germany) Montaplast by Land-Motorsport	Audi R8 LMS Evo	28	(South Africa) Kelvin van der Linde (South Africa) Sheldon van der Linde	OSC; 1; 2	OSC; 2 Ret	MST; 1; 9	MST; 2; 8	RBR; 1; 5	RBR; 2; 13	NÜR; 1 Ret	NÜR; 2; 10	ZAN; 1; 2	ZAN; 2; 11	SAC; 1; 1	SAC; 2; 2	HOC; 1; 3	HOC; 2; 1	2nd	136
2018	(Germany) Montaplast by Land-Motorsport	Audi R8 LMS Evo	29	(Germany) Christopher Mies (Belgium) Alessio Picariello (United Kingdom) Jake Dennis (Spain) Alex Riberas	OSC; 1; 18	OSC; 2; 11	MST; 1 Ret	MST; 2; 6	RBR; 1; 20	RBR; 2; 11	NÜR; 1 Ret	NÜR; 2; 7	ZAN; 1; 3	ZAN; 2; 16	SAC; 1; 8	SAC; 2; 10	HOC; 1 Ret	HOC; 2 Ret	18th	34
2019	(Germany) Montaplast by Land-Motorsport	Audi R8 LMS Evo	28	(Switzerland) Ricardo Feller (Belgium) Dries Vanthoor (Belgium) Frédéric Vervisch	OSC; 1; 4	OSC; 2; 2	MST; 1; 15	MST; 2; 10	RBR; 1; 12	RBR; 2; 23	ZAN; 1; 11	ZAN; 2; 1	NÜR; 1; 8	NÜR; 2; 18	HOC; 1; 6	HOC; 2; 2	SAC; 1; 12	SAC; 2; 24	5th	117
2019	(Germany) Montaplast by Land-Motorsport	Audi R8 LMS Evo	29	(Austria) Max Hofer (Germany) Christopher Mies	OSC; 1; 7	OSC; 2; 20	MST; 1; 3	MST; 2; 25	RBR; 1; 6	RBR; 2; 6	ZAN; 1; 5	**ZAN**; **2**; 2	NÜR; 1; 5	NÜR; 2; 8	HOC; 1 Ret	HOC; 2; 17	SAC; 1; 2	SAC; 2; 3	4th	134
2020	(Germany) Montaplast by Land-Motorsport	Audi R8 LMS Evo	28	(Germany) Christopher Haase (Austria) Max Hofer	LAU1; 1; 3	LAU1; 2; 14	NÜR; 1 Ret	NÜR; 2; 6	HOC; 1; 8	HOC; 2; 2	SAC; 1; 15	SAC; 2; 4	RBR; 1; 20	RBR; 2; 6	LAU2; 1; 1	LAU2; 2; 12	OSC; 1; 4	OSC; 2; 11	5th	127
2020	(Germany) Montaplast by Land-Motorsport	Audi R8 LMS Evo	29	(Germany) Christopher Mies (Germany) Kim-Luis Schramm	LAU1; 1; 26	LAU1; 2; 6	NÜR; 1; 30	NÜR; 2; 20	HOC; 1; 13	HOC; 2; 10	SAC; 1; 12	SAC; 2 Ret	RBR; 1; 15	RBR; 2 Ret	LAU2; 1 Ret	LAU2; 2; 16	OSC; 1; 11	OSC; 2 Ret	26th	29
2021	(Germany) Montaplast by Land-Motorsport	Audi R8 LMS Evo	28	(Germany) Christopher Haase (Germany) Luca-Sandro Trefz	OSC; 1; 24	OSC; 2; 13	RBR; 1; 21	RBR; 2; 13	ZAN; 1; 23	ZAN; 2; 8	LAU; 1 Ret	LAU; 2; 9	SAC; 1; 21	SAC; 2; 17	HOC; 1; 9	HOC; 2; 23	NÜR; 1; 20	NÜR; 2; 16	26th	28
2021	(Germany) Montaplast by Land-Motorsport	Audi R8 LMS Evo	29	(Switzerland) Ricardo Feller (Germany) Christopher Mies	OSC; 1; 3	OSC; 2; 5	RBR; 1; 12	RBR; 2; 7	**ZAN**; **1**; 1	ZAN; 2 Ret	**LAU**; **1**; 1	LAU; 2; 6	SAC; 1; 3	SAC; 2; 5	HOC; 1; 2	HOC; 2; 7	**NÜR**; **1**; 1	NÜR; 2; 10	1st	199
2022	(Germany) Montaplast by Land Motorsport	Audi R8 LMS Evo II	1	(Germany) Christopher Mies (Germany) Tim Zimmermann	OSC; 1; 12	OSC; 2; 12	RBR; 1; 13	RBR; 2; 13	ZAN; 1; 9	ZAN; 2; 4	NÜR; 1; 8	NÜR; 2; 18	LAU; 1; 8	LAU; 2; 1	SAC; 1; 8	**SAC**; **2**; 11	HOC; 1; 9	HOC; 2; 12	12th	104
2022	(Germany) Montaplast by Land Motorsport	Audi R8 LMS Evo II	28	(Germany) Christopher Haase (Germany) Salman Owega	OSC; 1; 17	OSC; 2; 17	RBR; 1; 17	RBR; 2 DNS	ZAN; 1; 13	ZAN; 2; 15	NÜR; 1 Ret	NÜR; 2; 14	LAU; 1; 18	LAU; 2; 18	SAC; 1; 15	SAC; 2; 4	HOC; 1 WD	HOC; 2 WD	28th	20
2022	(Germany) Montaplast by Land Motorsport	Audi R8 LMS Evo II	29	(Germany) Jusuf Owega (Switzerland) Ricardo Feller (Belgium) Dries Vanthoor	OSC; 1; 1	OSC; 2; 6	RBR; 1; 7	RBR; 2; 5	ZAN; 1; 4	ZAN; 2 DNS	NÜR; 1; 12	NÜR; 2; 17	LAU; 1; 7	LAU; 2; 13	SAC; 1; 17	SAC; 2 Ret	HOC; 1; 8	HOC; 2; 2	8th	117
2024	(Germany) Land-Motorsport	Audi R8 LMS Evo II	29	(Germany) Juliano Holzem (Germany) Sandro Holzem	OSC; 1 WD	OSC; 2 WD	ZAN; 1; 11	ZAN; 2; 12	NÜR; 1; 7	NÜR; 2; 12	SPA; 1; 6	SPA; 2; 14	RBR; 1; 10	RBR; 2; 6	HOC; 1; 5	HOC; 2; 4			11th	89
2025	(Germany) Land-Motorsport	Audi R8 LMS Evo II	68	(Germany) Carrie Schreiner (Switzerland) Alain Valente	LAU; 1; 12	LAU; 2; 7	ZAN; 1; 11	ZAN; 2; 13	NÜR; 1 Ret	NÜR; 2; 10	SAL; 1; 12	SAL; 2; 11	RBR; 1; 13	RBR; 2; 15	HOC; 1; 10	HOC; 2; 13			14th	55

=== Complete IMSA SportsCar Championship results ===
(key) (Races in bold indicate pole position; races in italics indicate fastest lap)

Year	Entrant	Class	No	Chassis	Engine	Drivers	1	2	3	4	5	6	7	8	9	10	11	12	Pos.	Pts	MEC
2017	(Germany) Montaplast by Land-Motorsport	GTD	29	Audi R8 LMS	Audi DAR 5.2 L V10	(United States) Connor De Phillippi (Germany) Christopher Mies (France) Jules Gounon (Switzerland) Jeffrey Schmidt (South Africa) Sheldon van der Linde	DAY; 2	SEB; 4	LBH	COA	DET	WGL	MOS	LRP	ELK	VIR	LGA	PET; 1	17th	96	19
2018	(Germany) Montaplast by Land-Motorsport	GTD	29	Audi R8 LMS	Audi DAR 5.2 L V10	(South Africa) Sheldon van der Linde (Germany) Christopher Mies (South Africa) Kelvin van der Linde (Switzerland) Jeffrey Schmidt (Belgium) Alessio Picariello (Canada) Daniel Morad	DAY; 7	SEB; 4	MDO	DET	WGL; 13	MOS	LRP	ELK	VIR	LGA	PET; 6		14th	95	24
2019	(Germany) Montaplast by Land-Motorsport	GTD	29	Audi R8 LMS Evo	Audi DAR 5.2 L V10	(Switzerland) Ricardo Feller (Germany) Christopher Mies (Canada) Daniel Morad (Belgium) Dries Vanthoor	DAY; 22	SEB; 4	MDO	DET	WGL; 8	MOS	LRP	ELK	VIR	LGA	PET; 2		14th	92	34
