= Christopher Mies =

German racing driver (born 1989)

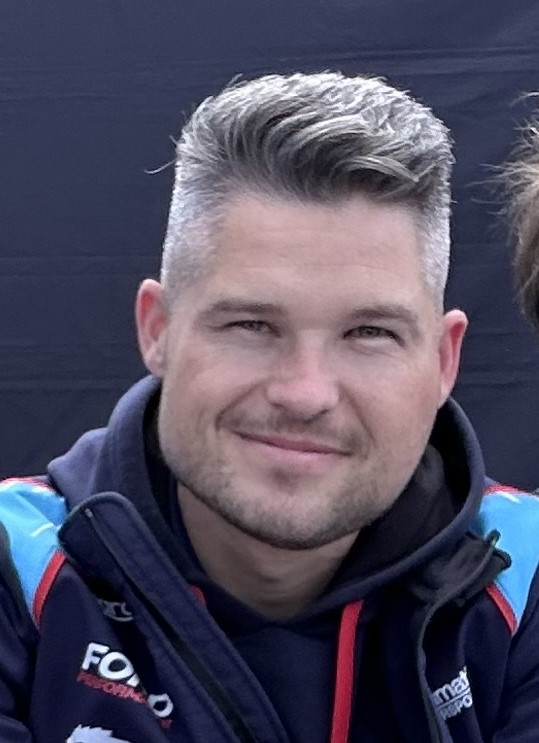
- Mies in 2024
- Nationality: (Germany) German
- Born: 24 May 1989 (age 37) Heiligenhaus, West Germany
- Relatives: Alexander Mies (brother)
- Categorisation: FIA Gold (until 2015); FIA Platinum (2016–)

Championship titles
- 2008 2009 2011, 2012 2012 2015, 2017, 2024 2015 2016, 2021: ADAC Procar Series (Division 2); FIA GT3 European Championship; Bathurst 12 Hour; Blancpain Endurance Series; 24 Hours Nürburgring; Australian GT Championship; ADAC GT Masters

Christopher Mies (born 24 May 1989) is a professional German racing driver for Ford Racing. He was previously an Audi Sport factory driver from 2009 to 2023. Mies has won the Nürburgring 24 Hours three times, the Bathurst 12 Hour and ADAC GT Masters twice, and the Blancpain Endurance Series and FIA GT3 European Championship once.

== Career ==
Mies began his career in 2006 in the Toyota Yaris Cup Germany, followed in 2007 by the Ford Fiesta Cup Germany. While racing a Ford Fiesta ST he won Division 2 of the ADAC Procar Series in 2008. In the same year he also moved into GT Racing for the first time, entering two races of the ADAC GT Masters in an Audi R8 LMS, thus beginning a long connection with the Audi brand. In 2009, he won his first major championship title, winning the FIA GT3 European Championship for Phoenix Racing with Christopher Haase, once again in an Audi R8 LMS. He moved to Abt Sportsline for the 2010 ADAC GT Masters season, finishing second in the championship. In 2011, he won the Bathurst 12 Hour for Joest Racing alongside Marc Basseng and Darryl O'Young. He repeated the achievement in 2012 with O'Young and Christer Jöns, this time for Phoenix Racing.

Mies went on to cement his rising reputation within GT3 ranks with a victory in the 2012 Blancpain Endurance Series. In 2013 and 2014, Mies raced in a diverse range of series and events, including largely unsuccessful returns to Bathurst and the Blancpain Endurance Series as well as appearances in the 24 Hours Nürburgring, Sepang 12 Hours and United SportsCar Championship. 2015 became Mies' most successful year to date, most notably winning the 24 Hours Nürburgring with Nico Müller, Edward Sandström and Laurens Vanthoor in the new Audi R8 LMS for Team WRT. He also continued his association with Australia through winning the Australian GT Championship, as well as the Australian Tourist Trophy, for Jamec Pem Racing and also finished second in the Highlands 101 for the team. In 2016 he continued in the Australian GT Championship as defending champion, once again with Jamec Pem Racing. He also continued in the Blancpain GT Series with Team WRT, finishing second in the series. With Connor De Phillippi, Mies won the 2016 ADAC GT Masters.

In 2017, Mies won the 24 Hours Nürburgring for a second time with Kelvin van der Linde, Connor de Phillippi and Markus Winkelhock in a Land Motorsport Audi R8 LMS.

In 2021, Mies won his second ADAC GT Masters title with Ricardo Feller.

Mies returned to the GT World Challenge Europe in 2023, joining fellow factory drivers Simon Gachet and Patric Niederhauser in an Endurance Cup Pro class entry for Saintéloc Racing, as well as a Sprint Cup entry alongside Grégoire Demoustier.

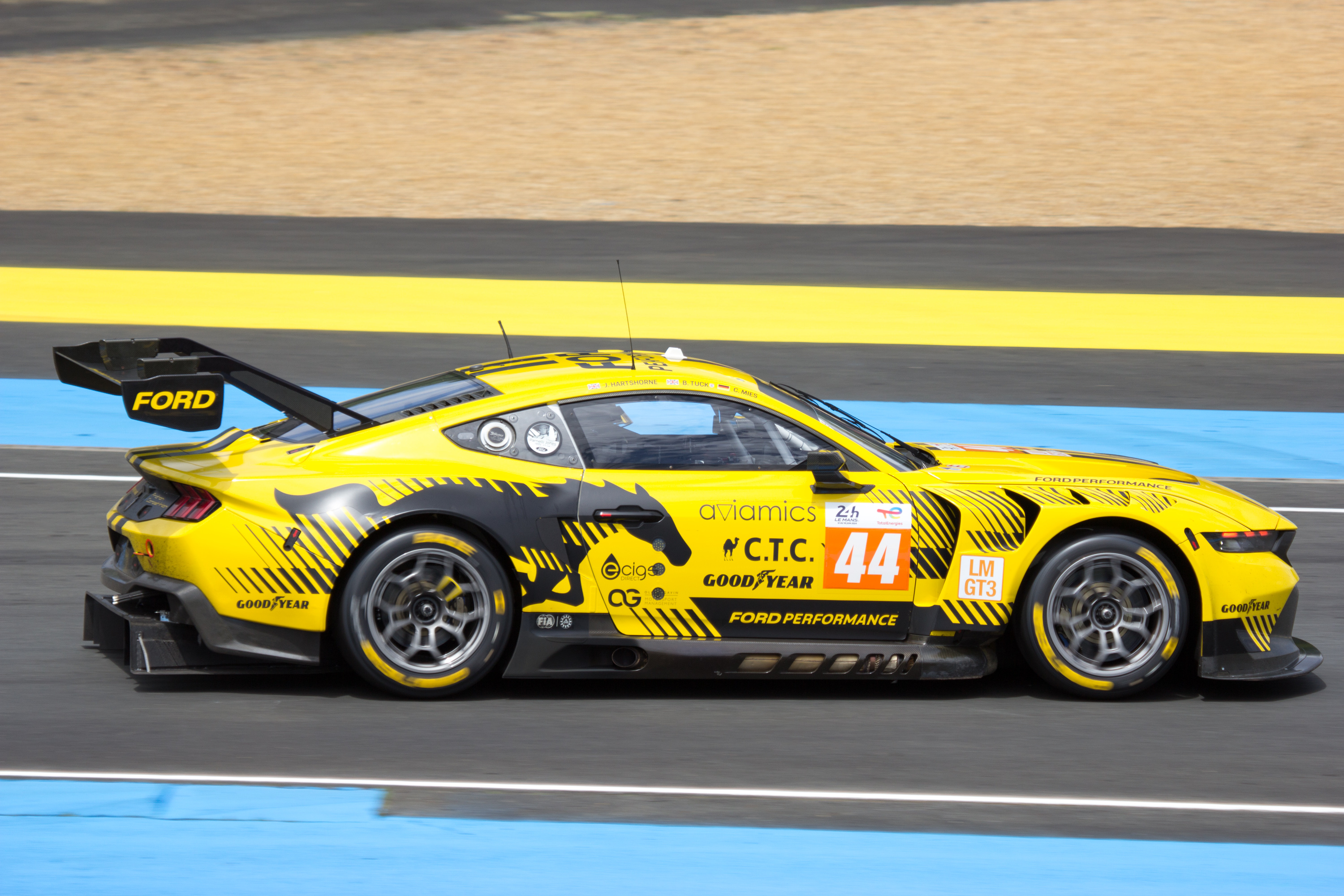
Mies' No. 44 car at the 2024 24 Hours of Le Mans

In November 2023, Mies announced his departure from Audi, and joined Ford later. He made his Ford debut at 2024 24 Hours of Daytona, finished 6th in GTD Pro class.

== Racing record ==
=== Racing career summary ===
Season	Series	Team	Races	Wins	Poles	F/Laps	Podiums	Points	Position
2007	German Ford Fiesta ST Cup	?	?	?	?	?	?	?	?
2008	ADAC Procar Series - Division 2	?	?	?	?	?	?	?	**1st**
2008	ADAC GT Masters	JvO Autosport	2	0	0	0	0	0	NC
2009	FIA GT3 European Championship	Phoenix Racing	11	3	1	0	5	54.5	**1st**
2009	ADAC GT Masters	Phoenix Racing	4	0	0	1	3	33	13th
2009	ADAC GT Masters	Abt Sportsline	4	0	0	1	3	33	13th
2009	24 Hours of Nürburgring - SP9	Uwe Alzen Automotive	1	0	0	0	1	N/A	**3rd**
2010	ADAC GT Masters	Abt Sportsline	14	3	4	1	6	70	**2nd**
2010	24 Hours of Nürburgring - SP9	Abt Sportsline	1	0	0	0	0	N/A	DNF
2011	ADAC GT Masters	Abt Sportsline	14	1	3	0	4	133	**3rd**
2011	24 Hours of Nürburgring - SP9	Abt Sportsline	1	0	0	0	0	N/A	8th
2011	Blancpain Endurance Series	Belgian Audi Club WRT	1	0	0	0	0	10	44th
2012	ADAC GT Masters	Prosperia uhc speed	15	0	1	1	1	39	20th
2012	Blancpain Endurance Series	Belgian Audi Club WRT	6	1	0	0	3	114	**1st**
2012	24 Hours of Nürburgring - SP9	Audi Sport Team Phoenix	1	0	0	0	0	N/A	5th
2013	ADAC GT Masters	Prosperia C. Abt Racing	16	2	1	0	5	146	9th
2013	Blancpain Endurance Series	Belgian Audi Club WRT	5	0	0	0	2	48	4th
2013	24 Hours of Nürburgring - SP9	Belgian Audi Club WRT	1	0	0	0	0	N/A	DNF
2014	United SportsCar Championship - GTD	Fall-Line Motorsports	1	0	0	0	0	26	64th
2014	Blancpain Endurance Series	Belgian Audi Club WRT	5	1	0	0	2	67	**3rd**
2014	Blancpain Sprint Series	Prosperia C. Abt Racing	2	0	0	0	0	0	NC
2014	24 Hours of Nürburgring - SP9	Prosperia C. Abt Racing	1	0	0	0	0	N/A	14th
2015	Blancpain Endurance Series	Belgian Audi Club WRT	1	0	0	0	0	23	14th
2015	Blancpain Endurance Series	Phoenix Racing	2	0	0	0	1	23	14th
2015	Blancpain Endurance Series	Saintéloc	1	0	0	0	0	23	14th
2015	Blancpain Sprint Series	Belgian Audi Club WRT	14	0	1	0	4	62	8th
2015	24 Hours of Nürburgring - SP9	Audi Sport Team WRT	1	1	0	0	1	N/A	**1st**
2015	Australian GT Championship	JAMEC Pem Racing	11	3	1	6	3	643	**1st**
2015-16	Asian Le Mans Series - GT	Absolute Racing	1	1	1	0	1	26	11th
2016	ADAC GT Masters	Montaplast by Land-Motorsport	16	1	3	1	7	168	**1st**
2016	Blancpain GT Series Endurance Cup	Audi Sport Team Phoenix	1	0	0	0	0	18	20th
2016	Blancpain GT Series Endurance Cup	Belgian Audi Club WRT	1	0	0	0	0	18	20th
2016	Blancpain GT Series Sprint Cup	Belgian Audi Club WRT	8	3	0	1	5	79	**2nd**
2016	24 Hours of Nürburgring - SP9	Audi Sport Team WRT	1	0	0	0	0	N/A	19th
2017	IMSA SportsCar Championship - GTD	Montaplast by Land-Motorsport	3	1	0	0	2	96	28th
2017	ADAC GT Masters	Montaplast by Land-Motorsport	14	1	0	0	4	120	**3rd**
2017	Blancpain GT Series Endurance Cup	Belgian Audi Club Team WRT	2	0	0	0	0	20	18th
2017	Blancpain GT Series Sprint Cup	Belgian Audi Club Team WRT	8	0	0	0	0	2	28th
2017	24 Hours of Nürburgring - SP9	Audi Sport Team Land	1	1	0	0	1	N/A	**1st**
2018	IMSA SportsCar Championship - GTD	Montaplast by Land-Motorsport	4	0	0	0	0	96	22nd
2018	ADAC GT Masters	Montaplast by Land-Motorsport	14	0	0	0	1	34	18th
2018	Blancpain GT Series Endurance Cup	Belgian Audi Club Team WRT	5	1	0	1	1	37	7th
2018	Blancpain GT Series Sprint Cup	Belgian Audi Club Team WRT	10	3	0	1	6	90.5	**2nd**
2018	24 Hours of Nürburgring - SP9	Audi Sport Team Land	1	0	0	0	0	N/A	5th
2019	IMSA SportsCar Championship - GTD	Montaplast by Land-Motorsport	4	0	0	0	1	92	28th
2019	ADAC GT Masters	Montaplast by Land-Motorsport	14	0	1	1	4	134	4th
2019	Blancpain GT Series Endurance Cup	Montaplast by Land-Motorsport	1	0	0	0	0	0	NC
2019	GT World Challenge Europe	Belgian Audi Club Team WRT	8	0	0	0	0	23	11th
2019	24 Hours of Nürburgring - SP9	Audi Sport Team Land	1	0	0	0	0	N/A	DNF
2020	ADAC GT Masters	Montaplast by Land-Motorsport	14	0	0	0	0	29	26th
2020	GT World Challenge Europe Endurance Cup	Belgian Audi Club Team WRT	4	0	0	1	0	39	8th
2020	24 Hours of Nürburgring - SP9	Audi Sport Team Land	1	0	0	0	0	N/A	6th
2021	IMSA SportsCar Championship - LMP2	DragonSpeed USA	1	0	0	0	1	0	NC†
2021	ADAC GT Masters	Montaplast by Land-Motorsport	14	3	3	3	6	199	**1st**
2021	GT World Challenge Europe Endurance Cup	Attempto Racing	5	0	0	0	0	7	58th
2021	GT World Challenge Europe Sprint Cup	Attempto Racing	6	0	0	0	0	1.5	31st
2021	GT World Challenge Europe Sprint Cup	ROFGO Racing With Team WRT	2	0	0	0	0	1.5	31st
2021	24 Hours of Nürburgring - SP9	Audi Sport Team Land	1	0	0	0	0	N/A	DNF
2022	ADAC GT Masters	Montaplast by Land-Motorsport	14	1	1	2	1	104	12th
2022	GT World Challenge Europe Endurance Cup	Saintéloc Junior Team	5	1	0	0	0	33	13th
2022	GT World Challenge Europe Sprint Cup	Team WRT	10	0	0	0	0	22	9th
2022	24 Hours of Nürburgring - SP9	Audi Sport Team Lionspeed by Car Collection	1	0	0	0	0	N/A	6th
2023	GT World Challenge Europe Endurance Cup	Saintéloc Junior Team	5	0	0	0	0	41	6th
2023	GT World Challenge Europe Sprint Cup	Saintéloc Junior Team	10	0	0	0	0	1	22nd
2023	24 Hours of Nürburgring - SP9	Audi Sport Team Land	1	0	0	0	0	N/A	6th
2024	IMSA SportsCar Championship - GTD Pro	Ford Multimatic Motorsports	3	0	0	0	0	786	21st
2024	GT World Challenge Europe Endurance Cup	Proton Competition	5	0	0	0	0	1	31st
2024	24 Hours of Le Mans - LMGT3	Proton Competition	1	0	0	0	0	N/A	4th
2024	24 Hours of Nürburgring - SP9	Scherer Sport PHX	1	1	0	0	1	N/A	**1st**
2024	992 Endurance Cup	Black Falcon Team 48 LOSCH	1	1	0	0	1	N/A	**1st**
2025	IMSA SportsCar Championship - GTD Pro	Ford Multimatic Motorsports	10	1	0	0	1	2174	8th
2026	IMSA SportsCar Championship - GTD Pro	Ford Racing	10	1	0	0	3	2825	5th
2026	Nürburgring Langstrecken-Serie - SP9	HRT Ford Racing							
2026	24 Hours of Nürburgring - SP9	HRT Ford Racing	1	0	0	0	0	N/A	6th
2026	Intercontinental GT Challenge	HRT Ford Racing	2	0	0	0	0	28*	10th*
2026	Intercontinental GT Challenge	Miedecke Motorsport by Team MPC	1	0	1	0	1	28*	10th*
2026	Intercontinental GT Challenge	Dollahite Racing						28*	10th*
2026	GT World Challenge America - Pro-Am	Dollahite Racing	1	0	0	0	0	0	NC†

^{*} Season still in progress.

=== Complete FIA GT3 European Championship results ===
(key) (Races in bold indicate pole position) (Races in italics indicate fastest lap)

Year	Team	Car	1	2	3	4	5	6	7	8	9	10	11	12	Pos.	Points
2009	Phoenix Racing	Audi R8 LMS	SIL; 1; 27	SIL; 2; 2	ADR; 1; 9	ADR; 2; 23	OSC; 1; 2	OSC; 2; 6	ALG; 1; 1	ALG; 2; 1	LEC; 1; 8	LEC; 2 DNS	**ZOL**; **1**; 1	ZOL; 2; 4	1st	54.5

=== Complete ADAC GT Masters results ===
(key) (Races in bold indicate pole position) (Races in italics indicate fastest lap)

Year	Team	Car	1	2	3	4	5	6	7	8	9	10	11	12	13	14	15	16	Pos.	Points
2008	JvO Autosport	Porsche 997 GT3 Cup	OSC; 1	OSC; 2	NÜR; 1	NÜR; 2	NOR; 1	NOR; 2	ASS; 1	ASS; 2	NÜR; 1; 17	NÜR; 2; 14	LAU; 1	LAU; 2	SAC; 1	SAC; 2			NC	0
2009	Phoenix Racing	Audi R8 LMS	OSC; 1	OSC; 2	ASS; 1	ASS; 2	HOC; 1	HOC; 2	LAU; 1; 3	LAU; 2; 5	NÜR; 1 Ret	NÜR; 2; 9							13th	33
2009	Abt Sportsline	Audi R8 LMS											SAC; 1; 3	SAC; 2; 2	OSC; 1; 4	OSC; 2; 7			13th	33
2010	Abt Sportsline	Audi R8 LMS	OSC; 1; 8	OSC; 2 Ret	**SAC**; **1**; 2	**SAC**; **2**; 1	HOC; 1; 7	HOC; 2 Ret	ASS; 1; 1	**ASS**; **2**; 3	LAU; 1; 2	LAU; 2; 7	NÜR; 1; 2	NÜR; 2; 6	**OSC**; **1**; 1	OSC; 2; 9			**2nd**	**70**
2011	Abt Sportsline	Audi R8 LMS	OSC; 1; 4	OSC; 2; 31	**SAC**; **1**; 1	SAC; 2; 3	ZOL; 1; 3	ZOL; 2; 29	NÜR; 1 Ret	NÜR; 2; 4	RBR; 1; 5	RBR; 2; 8	LAU; 1; 6	LAU; 2; 7	**ASS**; **1**; 2	**ASS**; **2**; 6	HOC; 1 Ret	HOC; 2; 30	**3rd**	**133**
2012	Prosperia uhc speed	Audi R8 LMS Ultra	**OSC**; **1**; 18	OSC; 2 Ret	ZAN; 1 DNS	ZAN; 2; 8	SAC; 1; 9	SAC; 2; 2	NÜR; 1; 38	NÜR; 2; 14	RBR; 1; 24	RBR; 2; 8	LAU; 1 Ret	LAU; 2; 6	NÜR; 1; 10	NÜR; 2; 26	HOC; 1; 9	HOC; 2; 27	20th	39
2013	Prosperia C. Abt Racing	Audi R8 LMS Ultra	OSC; 1; 1	OSC; 2 Ret	SPA; 1; 5	SPA; 2 Ret	**SAC**; **1**; 1	SAC; 2; 3	NÜR; 1; 10	NÜR; 2 Ret	RBR; 1; 6	RBR; 2; 6	LAU; 1; 18	LAU; 2; 6	SVK; 1; 5	SVK; 2; 2	HOC; 1 Ret	HOC; 2; 2	9th	146
2016	Montaplast by Land-Motorsport	Audi R8 LMS	**OSC**; **1**; 2	OSC; 2; 2	SAC; 1; 2	SAC; 2; 7	LAU; 1; 6	LAU; 2; 3	RBR; 1 Ret	RBR; 2; 6	NÜR; 1; 18	NÜR; 2; 1	**ZAN**; **1**; 2	ZAN; 2; 4	**HOC**; **1**; 2	HOC; 2; 8			**1st**	**168**
2017	Montaplast by Land-Motorsport	Audi R8 LMS	OSC; 1; 3	OSC; 2; 10	LAU; 1; 18	LAU; 2; 2	RBR; 1; 8	RBR; 2 Ret	ZAN; 1; 12	ZAN; 2; 1	NÜR; 1; 17	NÜR; 2; 6	**SAC**; **1**; 1	SAC; 2; 9	HOC; 1; 2	HOC; 2; 8			**3rd**	**120**
2018	Montaplast by Land-Motorsport	Audi R8 LMS	OSC; 1; 18	OSC; 2; 11	MST; 1 Ret	MST; 2; 6	RBR; 1; 20	RBR; 2; 11	NÜR; 1 Ret	NÜR; 2; 7	ZAN; 1; 3	ZAN; 2; 16	SAC; 1; 8	SAC; 2; 10	HOC; 1 Ret	HOC; 2 Ret			18th	34
2019	Montaplast by Land-Motorsport	Audi R8 LMS Evo	OSC; 1; 7	OSC; 2; 20	MST; 1; 3	MST; 2; 25	RBR; 1; 6	RBR; 2; 6	ZAN; 1; 5	**ZAN**; **2**; 2	NÜR; 1; 5	NÜR; 2; 8	HOC; 1 Ret	HOC; 2; 17	SAC; 1; 2	SAC; 2; 3			4th	134
2020	Montaplast by Land-Motorsport	Audi R8 LMS Evo	LAU; 1; 26	LAU; 2; 6	NÜR; 1; 30	NÜR; 2; 20	HOC; 1; 13	HOC; 2; 10	SAC; 1; 12	SAC; 2 Ret	RBR; 1; 15	RBR; 2 Ret	LAU; 1 Ret	LAU; 2; 16	OSC; 1; 11	OSC; 2 Ret			26th	29
2021	Montaplast by Land-Motorsport	Audi R8 LMS Evo	OSC; 1; 3	OSC; 2; 5	RBR; 1; 12	RBR; 2; 7	**ZAN**; **1**; 1	ZAN; 2 Ret	**LAU**; **1**; 1	LAU; 2; 6	SAC; 1; 3	SAC; 2; 5	HOC; 1; 2	HOC; 2; 7	**NÜR**; **1**; 1	NÜR; 2; 10			**1st**	**199**
2022	Montaplast by Land-Motorsport	Audi R8 LMS Evo II	OSC; 1; 12	OSC; 2; 12	RBR; 1; 13	RBR; 2; 13	ZAN; 1; 9	ZAN; 2; 4	NÜR; 1; 8	NÜR; 2; 18	LAU; 1; 8	LAU; 2; 1	SAC; 1; 8	**SAC**; **2**; 11	HOC; 1; 9	HOC; 2; 12			12th	104

=== Complete GT World Challenge Europe results ===
(key) (Races in bold indicate pole position) (Races in italics indicate fastest lap)

==== GT World Challenge Europe Sprint Cup ====
Year	Team	Car	Class	1	2	3	4	5	6	7	8	9	10	11	12	13	14	Pos.	Points
Blancpain Sprint Series
2014	Prosperia ABT Racing	Audi R8 LMS ultra	Pro	NOG; QR	NOG; CR	BRH; QR	BRH; CR	ZAN; QR	ZAN; CR	SVK; QR	SVK; CR	ALG; QR	ALG; CR	ZOL; QR	ZOL; CR	BAK; QR; Ret	BAK; CR; 15	NC	0
2015	Belgian Audi Club Team WRT	Audi R8 LMS ultra	Pro	NOG; QR; 3	NOG; CR; 3	BRH; QR; 9	BRH; CR; 14	ZOL; QR; 9	ZOL; CR; Ret	MOS; QR; 5	MOS; CR; 7	**ALG**; **QR**; 10	ALG; CR; 7	MIS; QR; 3	MIS; CR; 8	ZAN; QR; 15	ZAN; CR; 2	8th	62
Blancpain GT Series Sprint Cup
2016	Belgian Audi Club Team WRT	Audi R8 LMS	Pro	MIS; QR; 13	MIS; CR; 8	BRH; QR; 3	BRH; CR; 1	NÜR; QR; 1	NÜR; CR; 4	HUN; QR; 1	HUN; CR; 2	CAT; QR	CAT; CR					2nd	79
2017	Belgian Audi Club Team WRT	Audi R8 LMS	Pro	MIS; QR; 6	MIS; CR; 11	BRH; QR; Ret	BRH; CR; 14	ZOL; QR; 6	ZOL; CR; 13	HUN; QR; 8	HUN; CR; 18	NÜR; QR	NÜR; CR					28th	2
2018	Belgian Audi Club Team WRT	Audi R8 LMS	Pro	ZOL; 1; 3	ZOL; 2 Ret	BRH; 1; 2	BRH; 2; 2	MIS; 1; 1	MIS; 2; 1	HUN; 1 Ret	HUN; 2; 4	NÜR; 1; 1	NÜR; 2; 16					2nd	90.5
Blancpain GT World Challenge Europe
2019	Belgian Audi Club Team WRT	Audi R8 LMS Evo	Pro	BRH; 1; 12	BRH; 2; 6	MIS; 1	MIS; 2	ZAN; 1; 13	ZAN; 2; 5	NÜR; 1; 4	NÜR; 2; 26	HUN; 1; 8	HUN; 2; 7					11th	23
GT World Challenge Europe Sprint Cup
2021	Attempto Racing	Audi R8 LMS Evo	Pro	MAG; 1; 19	MAG; 2; 18	ZAN; 1; 10	ZAN; 2; 11	MIS; 1 Ret	MIS; 2; 17									31st	1.5
2021	ROFGO Racing With Team WRT	Audi R8 LMS Evo	Pro							BRH; 1; 18	BRH; 2; 9	VAL; 1	VAL; 2					31st	1.5
2022	Team WRT	Audi R8 LMS Evo II	Pro	BRH; 1 Ret	BRH; 2; 14	MAG; 1; 9	MAG; 2; 4	ZAN; 1; 9	ZAN; 2; 23	MIS; 1; 6	MIS; 2; 4	VAL; 1; 10	VAL; 2; 22					9th	22
2023	Saintéloc Junior Team	Audi R8 LMS Evo II	Pro	BRH; 1; 19	**BRH**; **2**; 17	MIS; 1; 22	MIS; 2; 18	HOC; 1; 23	HOC; 2 Ret	VAL; 1 Ret	VAL; 2 Ret	ZAN; 1 Ret	ZAN; 2; 22					22nd	1

==== GT World Challenge Europe Endurance Cup ====
Year	Team	Car	Class	1	2	3	4	5	6	7	8	Pos.	Points
Blancpain Endurance Series
2011	WRT Belgian Audi Club	Audi R8 LMS	Pro	MNZ	NAV	SPA; 6H	SPA; 12H	SPA; 24H	MAG	SIL; 5		44th	10
2012	Belgian Audi Club WRT	Audi R8 LMS Ultra	Pro	MNZ; 7	SIL; 3	LEC; 1	SPA; 6H; 2	SPA; 12H; 2	SPA; 24H; 2	NÜR; 4	NAV; 2	1st	114
2013	Belgian Audi Club WRT	Audi R8 LMS Ultra	Pro	MNZ; 4	SIL; 3	LEC; 27	SPA; 6H; 10	SPA; 12H; 6	SPA; 24H; 3	NÜR; Ret		5th	48
2014	Belgian Audi Club Team WRT	Audi R8 LMS Ultra	Pro	MNZ; Ret	SIL; 9	LEC; 7	SPA; 6H; 1	SPA; 12H; 3	SPA; 24H; 3	NÜR; 1		3rd	67
2015	Belgian Audi Club Team WRT	Audi R8 LMS Ultra	Pro	MNZ; Ret	SIL							14th	23
2015	Phoenix Racing	Audi R8 LMS Ultra	Pro			LEC; 20	SPA; 6H; 26	SPA; 12H; 9	SPA; 24H; 3			14th	23
2015	Saintéloc	Audi R8 LMS Ultra	Pro							NÜR; 7		14th	23
Blancpain GT Series Endurance Cup
2016	Audi Sport Team Phoenix	Audi R8 LMS	Pro	MNZ	SIL	LEC	SPA; 6H; 2	SPA; 12H; 2	SPA; 24H; 50			20th	18
2016	Belgian Audi Club Team WRT	Audi R8 LMS	Pro							NÜR; Ret		20th	18
2017	Belgian Audi Club Team WRT	Audi R8 LMS	Pro	MNZ	SIL	LEC; 8	SPA; 6H; 4	SPA; 12H; 10	SPA; 24H; 5	CAT		18th	20
2018	Belgian Audi Club Team WRT	Audi R8 LMS	Pro	MNZ; 1	SIL; 4	LEC; Ret	SPA; 6H; 24	SPA; 12H; 15	SPA; 24H; 40	CAT; 15		7th	37
2019	Montaplast by Land-Motorsport	Audi R8 LMS Evo	Pro	MNZ	SIL	LEC	SPA; 6H; 24	SPA; 12H; 15	SPA; 24H; 14	CAT		NC	0
GT World Challenge Europe Endurance Cup
2020	Belgian Audi Club Team WRT	Audi R8 LMS Evo	Pro	IMO; 4	NÜR; 5	SPA; 6H; 24	SPA; 12H; 49	SPA; 24H; Ret	LEC; 4			8th	39
2021	Attempto Racing	Audi R8 LMS Evo	Pro	MNZ; 12	LEC; 14	SPA; 6H; 29	SPA; 12H; 5	SPA; 24H; 9	NÜR; 11	BAR; 40		58th	7
2022	Saintéloc Junior Team	Audi R8 LMS Evo II	Pro	IMO; 9	LEC; Ret	SPA; 6H; 16	SPA; 12H; 28	SPA; 24H; 19	HOC; 1	BAR; 7		13th	33
2023	Saintéloc Junior Team	Audi R8 LMS Evo II	Pro	MNZ; 4	LEC; 4	SPA; 6H; 23	SPA; 12H; 24	SPA; 24H; 16	NÜR; 4	BAR; 9		6th	41
2024	Proton Competition	Ford Mustang GT3	Pro	LEC; 10	SPA; 6H; 40	SPA; 12H; 13	SPA; 24H; 19	NÜR; 24	MNZ; 20	JED; Ret		31st	1

=== Complete 24 Hours of Nürburgring results ===
Year	Team	Co-Drivers	Car	Class	Laps	Pos.	Class Pos.
2009	(Germany) Uwe Alzen Automotive	(Germany) Uwe Alzen (Germany) Sascha Bert (Germany) Lance David Arnold	Porsche 997 GT3 Cup	SP9	150	4th	**3rd**
2010	(Germany) Abt Sportsline	(Germany) Christian Abt (France) Emmanuel Collard (Germany) Lucas Luhr	Audi R8 LMS	SP9	125	DNF	DNF
2011	(Germany) Audi Sport Team Abt Sportsline	(Germany) Luca Ludwig (Germany) Christer Jöns (Germany) Christian Abt	Audi R8 LMS	SP9	149	12th	8th
2012	(Germany) Audi Sport Team Phoenix	(Germany) René Rast (Germany) Frank Stippler (Switzerland) Marcel Fässler	Audi R8 LMS	SP9	151	5th	5th
2013	(Belgium) Belgian Audi Club Team WRT	(Belgium) Laurens Vanthoor (Sweden) Edward Sandström (Germany) Christopher Haase	Audi R8 LMS ultra	SP9	44	DNF	DNF
2014	(Germany) Prosperia C. Abt Racing GmbH	(Germany) Christer Jöns (Germany) Niclas Kentenich (Germany) Dominik Schwager	Audi R8 LMS ultra	SP9	138	33rd	14th
2015	(Belgium) Audi Sport Team WRT	(Belgium) Laurens Vanthoor (Sweden) Edward Sandström (Switzerland) Nico Müller	Audi R8 LMS ultra	SP9	156	**1st**	**1st**
2016	(Belgium) Audi Sport Team WRT	(Belgium) Laurens Vanthoor (Switzerland) Nico Müller (Germany) Pierre Kaffer	Audi R8 LMS	SP9	109	47th	19th
2017	(Germany) Audi Sport Team Land	(United States) Connor De Phillippi (South Africa) Kelvin van der Linde (Germany) Markus Winkelhock	Audi R8 LMS	SP9	158	**1st**	**1st**
2018	(Germany) Audi Sport Team Land	(Germany) René Rast (South Africa) Kelvin van der Linde (South Africa) Sheldon van der Linde	Audi R8 LMS	SP9	133	6th	5th
2019	(Germany) Audi Sport Team Land	(Germany) René Rast (South Africa) Kelvin van der Linde (Germany) Christopher Haase	Audi R8 LMS Evo	SP9	139	DNF	DNF
2020	(Germany) Audi Sport Team Land	(Italy) Mattia Drudi (South Africa) Kelvin van der Linde (Germany) René Rast	Audi R8 LMS Evo	SP9	85	6th	6th
2021	(Germany) Audi Sport Team Land	(South Africa) Kelvin van der Linde (Germany) René Rast (Belgium) Frédéric Vervisch	Audi R8 LMS Evo	SP9	47	DNF	DNF
2022	(Germany) Audi Sport Team Lionspeed by Car Collection	(Italy) Mattia Drudi (Germany) Patrick Kolb (Switzerland) Patric Niederhauser	Audi R8 LMS Evo II	SP9	159	6th	6th
2023	(Germany) Audi Sport Team Land	(Germany) Christopher Haase (Switzerland) Patric Niederhauser	Audi R8 LMS Evo II	SP9	161	6th	6th
2024	(Germany) Scherer Sport PHX	(Switzerland) Ricardo Feller (Germany) Dennis Marschall (Germany) Frank Stippler	Audi R8 LMS Evo II	SP9	50	**1st**	**1st**
2026	(Germany) HRT Ford Racing	(Norway) Dennis Olsen (Germany) Frank Stippler (Belgium) Frédéric Vervisch	Ford Mustang GT3 Evo	SP9	155	7th	6th

=== Complete Bathurst 12 Hour results ===
Year	Team	Co-Drivers	Car	Class	Laps	Pos.	Class Pos.
2011	(Germany) Audi Race Experience Team Joest	(Hong Kong) Darryl O'Young (Germany) Marc Basseng	Audi R8 LMS	A	292	**1st**	**1st**
2012	(Germany) Phoenix Racing	(Hong Kong) Darryl O'Young (Germany) Christer Jöns	Audi R8 LMS	A	270	**1st**	**1st**
2013	(Australia) Hallmarc Racing	(Australia) Marc Cini (Australia) Mark Eddy (Australia) Dean Grant	Audi R8 LMS ultra	A	263	5th	5th
2014	(Australia) Hallmarc Racing	(Australia) Marc Cini (Australia) Mark Eddy	Audi R8 LMS ultra	A	278	10th	9th
2015	(Australia) Hallmarc Racing	(Australia) Marc Cini (Australia) Mark Eddy	Audi R8 LMS ultra	AA	267	10th	**3rd**
2016	(Australia) Jamec Pem Racing	(Germany) Christopher Haase (Italy) Marco Mapelli	Audi R8 LMS	AP	74	DNF	DNF
2017	(Australia) Jamec Pem Racing	(Germany) Christopher Haase (Australia) Garth Tander	Audi R8 LMS	APP	282	13th	6th
2018	(Australia) Melbourne Performance Centre	(Germany) Christopher Haase (Germany) Markus Winkelhock	Audi R8 LMS	APP	238	DNF	DNF
2019	(Australia) Audi Sport Team Valvoline	(Germany) Christopher Haase (Germany) Markus Winkelhock	Audi R8 LMS	APP	304	14th	9th
2020	(Australia) Melbourne Performance Centre	(Italy) Mattia Drudi (South Africa) Kelvin van der Linde	Audi R8 LMS Evo	Pro	308	18th	11th
2023	(Australia) Melbourne Performance Centre	(Switzerland) Ricardo Feller (Australia) Yasser Shahin	Audi R8 LMS Evo II	Pro-Am	320	9th	**2nd**
2026	(Germany) HRT Ford Racing	(Australia) Broc Feeney (Norway) Dennis Olsen	Ford Mustang GT3	Pro	3	DNF	DNF

=== Complete IMSA SportsCar Championship results ===
(key) (Races in bold indicate pole position; results in italics indicate fastest lap)

Year	Entrant	Class	Make	Engine	1	2	3	4	5	6	7	8	9	10	11	12	Rank	Points
2014	Fall-Line Motorsports	GTD	Audi R8 LMS ultra	Audi 5.2 L V10	DAY	SEB; 6	LGA	DET	WGL	MOS	IND	ELK	VIR	COA	PET		64th	26
2017	Montaplast by Land-Motorsport	GTD	Audi R8 LMS	Audi 5.2 L V10	DAY; 2	SEB; 4	LBH	AUS	BEL	WGL	MOS	LIM	ELK	VIR	LGA	PET; 1	28th	96
2018	Montaplast by Land-Motorsport	GTD	Audi R8 LMS	Audi 5.2 L V10	DAY; 7	SEB; 4	MOH	DET	WGL; 12	MOS	LIM	ELK	VIR	LGA	PET; 6		22nd	96
2019	Montaplast by Land-Motorsport	GTD	Audi R8 LMS Evo	Audi 5.2 L V10	DAY; 22	SEB; 4	MDO	DET	WGL; 8	MOS	LIM	ELK	VIR	LGA	PET; 2		28th	92
2021	DragonSpeed USA	LMP2	Oreca 07	Gibson GK428 4.2 L V8	DAY; 3†	SEB	WGL	WGL	ELK	LGA	PET						NC†	0†
2024	Ford Multimatic Motorsports	GTD Pro	Ford Mustang GT3	Ford Coyote 5.4 L V8	DAY; 6	SEB; 7	LGA	DET	WGL	MOS	ELK	VIR	IMS	PET; 8			21st	786
2025	Ford Multimatic Motorsports	GTD Pro	Ford Mustang GT3	Ford Coyote 5.4 L V8	DAY; 1	SEB; 6	LGA; 8	DET; 10	WGL; 10	MOS; 7	ELK; 5	VIR; 7	IMS; 10	PET; 5			8th	2714
2026	Ford Racing	GTD Pro	Ford Mustang GT3 Evo	Ford Coyote 5.4 L V8	DAY; 7	SEB; 8	LGA; 1	DET; 3	WGL; 10	MOS; 5	ELK; 4	VIR; 3	IMS; 7	PET; 11			5th	2825

^{*} Season still in progress.

=== Complete 24 Hours of Le Mans results ===
Year	Team	Co-Drivers	Car	Class	Laps	Pos.	Class Pos.
2024	(Germany) Proton Competition	(United Kingdom) John Hartshorne (United Kingdom) Ben Tuck	Ford Mustang GT3	LMGT3	280	31st	4th

Sporting positions
Preceded by James Ruffier; Arnaud Peyroles	FIA GT3 European Champion; 2009 with: Christopher Haase	Succeeded by Christian Hohenadel; Daniel Keilwitz
Preceded by John Bowe; Garry Holt; Paul Morris	Winner of the Bathurst 12 Hour; 2011 & 2012 (with Darryl O'Young & Marc Basseng 2011 & Christer Jöns 2012)	Succeeded by Thomas Jäger; Alexander Roloff; Bernd Schneider
Preceded by Greg Franchi	Blancpain Endurance Series; 2012; With: Christopher Haase and Stéphane Ortelli	Succeeded by Maximilian Buhk
Preceded by Richard Muscat	Australian GT; Champion; 2015	Succeeded by Klark Quinn
Preceded by Sebastian Asch; Luca Ludwig	ADAC GT Masters Champion; 2016 with: Connor De Phillippi	Succeeded by Jules Gounon
Preceded by Michael Ammermüller; Christian Engelhart	ADAC GT Masters; Champion; 2021; With: Ricardo Feller	Succeeded by Raffaele Marciello
