= 2016 ADAC GT Masters =

Motorsport season

The 2016 ADAC GT Masters was the tenth season of the ADAC GT Masters, the grand tourer-style sports car racing founded by the German automobile club ADAC. The season started on 15 April at Motorsport Arena Oschersleben and ended on 2 October at Hockenheim after seven double-header meetings.

== Entry list ==
Team	Car	No.	Driver	Status	Rounds
(Germany) AMG - Team Zakspeed	Mercedes-AMG GT3	1	(Germany) Sebastian Asch		All
(Germany) AMG - Team Zakspeed	Mercedes-AMG GT3	1	(Germany) Luca Ludwig		All
(Germany) AMG - Team Zakspeed	Mercedes-AMG GT3	21	(Switzerland) Nikolaj Rogivue	J	All
(Germany) AMG - Team Zakspeed	Mercedes-AMG GT3	21	(Sweden) Felix Rosenqvist		1
(Germany) AMG - Team Zakspeed	Mercedes-AMG GT3	21	(Denmark) Nicolai Sylvest	J	2–7
(Italy) Bonaldi Motorsport	Lamborghini Huracán GT3	3	(Finland) Patrick Kujala	J	1–6
(Italy) Bonaldi Motorsport	Lamborghini Huracán GT3	3	(Serbia) Miloš Pavlović		1–6
(Italy) Bonaldi Motorsport	Lamborghini Huracán GT3	32	(Germany) Florian Spengler		All
(Italy) Bonaldi Motorsport	Lamborghini Huracán GT3	32	(San Marino) Emanuele Zonzini	J	All
(Austria) HB Racing WDS Bau	Lamborghini Huracán GT3	5	(Netherlands) Jaap van Lagen		All
(Austria) HB Racing WDS Bau	Lamborghini Huracán GT3	5	(Austria) Norbert Siedler		1–6
(Austria) HB Racing WDS Bau	Lamborghini Huracán GT3	5	(Germany) Markus Pommer		7
(Austria) HB Racing WDS Bau	Lamborghini Huracán GT3	6	(Germany) Elia Erhart		All
(Austria) HB Racing WDS Bau	Lamborghini Huracán GT3	6	(Netherlands) Kelvin Snoeks		All
(Germany) Bentley Team Abt	Bentley Continental GT3	7	(Germany) Daniel Abt		All
(Germany) Bentley Team Abt	Bentley Continental GT3	7	(South Africa) Jordan Pepper	J	4–7
(Germany) Bentley Team Abt	Bentley Continental GT3	7	(Germany) Christer Jöns		1–3
(Germany) Bentley Team Abt	Bentley Continental GT3	8	(Germany) Christer Jöns		4–7
(Germany) Bentley Team Abt	Bentley Continental GT3	8	(Germany) Fabian Hamprecht	J	All
(Germany) Bentley Team Abt	Bentley Continental GT3	8	(United Kingdom) Guy Smith		1–3
(Germany) Bentley Team Abt	Bentley Continental GT3	9	(Germany) Andreas Weishaupt	T	All
(Germany) Bentley Team Abt	Bentley Continental GT3	9	(South Africa) Jordan Pepper	J	1–3
(Germany) Bentley Team Abt	Bentley Continental GT3	9	(Germany) Marco Holzer		4–7
(Austria) GRT Grasser Racing Team	Lamborghini Huracán GT3	11	(Germany) Nicolas Pohler	J	3–4
(Austria) GRT Grasser Racing Team	Lamborghini Huracán GT3	11	(Austria) Gerhard Tweraser		3
(Austria) GRT Grasser Racing Team	Lamborghini Huracán GT3	11	(Italy) Michele Beretta	J	4
(Austria) GRT Grasser Racing Team	Lamborghini Huracán GT3	16	(Germany) Luca Stolz	J	1–6
(Austria) GRT Grasser Racing Team	Lamborghini Huracán GT3	16	(Austria) Gerhard Tweraser		1–2, 4–5
(Austria) GRT Grasser Racing Team	Lamborghini Huracán GT3	16	(Italy) Mirko Bortolotti		3, 6
(Austria) GRT Grasser Racing Team	Lamborghini Huracán GT3	63	(Germany) Christian Engelhart		All
(Austria) GRT Grasser Racing Team	Lamborghini Huracán GT3	63	(Switzerland) Rolf Ineichen	T	All
(Germany) RWT Racing	Corvette Z06.R GT3	13	(Germany) Sven Barth		All
(Germany) RWT Racing	Corvette Z06.R GT3	13	(Switzerland) Remo Lips	T	All
(Germany) Phoenix Racing	R8 LMS	15	(Germany) Markus Winkelhock		1–5
(Germany) Phoenix Racing	R8 LMS	15	(Germany) Markus Pommer		1–4
(Germany) Phoenix Racing	R8 LMS	15	(Denmark) Nicolaj Møller Madsen	J	5
(Germany) KÜS Team75 Bernhard	Porsche 911 GT3 R	17	(Germany) David Jahn		All
(Germany) KÜS Team75 Bernhard	Porsche 911 GT3 R	17	(New Zealand) Chris van der Drift		1
(Germany) KÜS Team75 Bernhard	Porsche 911 GT3 R	17	(Austria) Klaus Bachler		2
(Germany) KÜS Team75 Bernhard	Porsche 911 GT3 R	17	(Italy) Matteo Cairoli	J	3
(Germany) KÜS Team75 Bernhard	Porsche 911 GT3 R	17	(France) Kévin Estre		4–7
(Germany) Schubert Motorsport	BMW M6 GT3	19	(Germany) Claudia Hürtgen		3, 6
(Germany) Schubert Motorsport	BMW M6 GT3	19	(Germany) Niklas Mackschin	J	3
(Germany) Schubert Motorsport	BMW M6 GT3	19	(Netherlands) Jeroen den Boer	T	6
(Germany) Schubert Motorsport	BMW M6 GT3	20	(Finland) Jesse Krohn		All
(Germany) Schubert Motorsport	BMW M6 GT3	20	(Germany) Martin Tomczyk		1, 7
(Germany) Schubert Motorsport	BMW M6 GT3	20	(Switzerland) Louis Delétraz		2–3, 5–6
(Germany) Schubert Motorsport	BMW M6 GT3	20	(Portugal) António Félix da Costa		4
(Germany) MRS GT-Racing	Nissan GT-R Nismo GT3	22	(Germany) Steve Feige	T	1–4
(Germany) MRS GT-Racing	Nissan GT-R Nismo GT3	22	(Netherlands) Bas Schothorst		1–4
(Germany) MRS GT-Racing	Nissan GT-R Nismo GT3	22	(Netherlands) Christiaan Frankenhout		5–7
(Germany) MRS GT-Racing	Nissan GT-R Nismo GT3	22	(Germany) Marc Gassner	J	5–7
(Germany) kfzteile24 APR Motorsport	R8 LMS	24	(Germany) Florian Stoll		1–5
(Germany) kfzteile24 APR Motorsport	R8 LMS	24	(Belgium) Laurens Vanthoor		1–2, 4–5
(Germany) kfzteile24 APR Motorsport	R8 LMS	24	(Netherlands) Robin Frijns		3
(Germany) kfzteile24 APR Motorsport	R8 LMS	25	(Austria) Daniel Dobitsch		1–5
(Germany) kfzteile24 APR Motorsport	R8 LMS	25	(Sweden) Edward Sandström		1–5
(Germany) Montaplast by Land-Motorsport	R8 LMS	28	(Netherlands) Peter Hoevenaars	J	1–5
(Germany) Montaplast by Land-Motorsport	R8 LMS	28	(Germany) Marc Basseng		1–2
(Germany) Montaplast by Land-Motorsport	R8 LMS	28	(Belgium) Frédéric Vervisch		3–6
(Germany) Montaplast by Land-Motorsport	R8 LMS	28	(Germany) Christopher Haase		6–7
(Germany) Montaplast by Land-Motorsport	R8 LMS	28	(Monaco) Stéphane Ortelli		7
(Germany) Montaplast by Land-Motorsport	R8 LMS	29	(Germany) Christopher Mies		All
(Germany) Montaplast by Land-Motorsport	R8 LMS	29	(United States) Connor De Phillippi	J	All
(Germany) Callaway Competition	Corvette C7 GT3-R	31	(United States) Boris Said		1, 3–4
(Germany) Callaway Competition	Corvette C7 GT3-R	31	(Netherlands) Loris Hezemans	J	1, 3, 6
(Germany) Callaway Competition	Corvette C7 GT3-R	31	(United States) Eric Curran		4, 6
(Germany) Callaway Competition	Corvette C7 GT3-R	31	(Germany) Maximilian Hackländer		7
(Germany) Callaway Competition	Corvette C7 GT3-R	31	(Switzerland) Lucas Mauron	J	7
(Germany) Callaway Competition	Corvette C7 GT3-R	69	(Germany) Patrick Assenheimer	J	All
(Germany) Callaway Competition	Corvette C7 GT3-R	69	(Germany) Dominik Schwager		All
(Germany) Callaway Competition	Corvette C7 GT3-R	77	(France) Jules Gounon	J	All
(Germany) Callaway Competition	Corvette C7 GT3-R	77	(Germany) Daniel Keilwitz		All
(Germany) Car Collection Motorsport	R8 LMS	33	(Germany) Christopher Haase		1–5
(Germany) Car Collection Motorsport	R8 LMS	33	(Netherlands) Christiaan Frankenhout		1–4
(Germany) Car Collection Motorsport	R8 LMS	33	(Germany) Dennis Busch		5
(Germany) Car Collection Motorsport	R8 LMS	34	(South Africa) Kelvin van der Linde		1–5
(Germany) Car Collection Motorsport	R8 LMS	34	(Spain) Isaac Tutumlu		1–5
(Germany) Car Collection Motorsport	R8 LMS	34	(Germany) Marc Basseng		7
(Germany) Car Collection Motorsport	R8 LMS	34	(Germany) Max Edelhoff	J	7
(Germany) Car Collection Motorsport	Mercedes-Benz SLS AMG GT3	35	(Germany) Florian Scholze	T	1–2, 4–5
(Germany) Car Collection Motorsport	Mercedes-Benz SLS AMG GT3	35	(Germany) Dominic Jöst	T	1–2
(Germany) Car Collection Motorsport	Mercedes-Benz SLS AMG GT3	35	(Austria) Karl Wendlinger		4–5
(Germany) BigFM Racing Team Schütz Motorsport	Porsche 911 GT3 R	36	(Germany) Marvin Dienst	J	All
(Germany) BigFM Racing Team Schütz Motorsport	Porsche 911 GT3 R	36	(Switzerland) Christopher Zanella		1–4, 6–7
(Germany) BigFM Racing Team Schütz Motorsport	Porsche 911 GT3 R	36	(Austria) Klaus Bachler		5
(Germany) Aust Motorsport	R8 LMS	44	(Sweden) Mikaela Åhlin-Kottulinsky	J	All
(Germany) Aust Motorsport	R8 LMS	44	(Italy) Marco Bonanomi		1–6
(Germany) Aust Motorsport	R8 LMS	44	(Germany) Pierre Kaffer		7
(Germany) Aust Motorsport	R8 LMS	55	(Netherlands) Xavier Maassen		1–6
(Germany) Aust Motorsport	R8 LMS	55	(Germany) Lukas Schreier	J	1–4
(Germany) Aust Motorsport	R8 LMS	55	(Germany) Markus Pommer		5–6
(Germany) Aust Motorsport	R8 LMS	55	(Germany) Steve Feige	T	7
(Germany) Aust Motorsport	R8 LMS	55	(Netherlands) Bas Schothorst		7
(Germany) YACO Racing	R8 LMS	50	(Germany) Philip Geipel		All
(Germany) YACO Racing	R8 LMS	50	(Switzerland) Rahel Frey		1–3, 5–7
(Germany) YACO Racing	R8 LMS	50	(Germany) Marc Basseng		4
(Germany) ADAC NSA / Attempto Racing	Lamborghini Huracán GT3	66	(Germany) André Gies	J (Note: At Round 7 both André Gies and Emil Lindholm were ineligible for Junior class points.)	All
(Germany) ADAC NSA / Attempto Racing	Lamborghini Huracán GT3	66	(Finland) Emil Lindholm	J	All
(Germany) ADAC NSA / Attempto Racing	Lamborghini Huracán GT3	67	(Switzerland) Patric Niederhauser		1–3
(Germany) ADAC NSA / Attempto Racing	Lamborghini Huracán GT3	67	(Italy) Daniel Zampieri		1–3
(Germany) Precote Herberth Motorsport	Porsche 911 GT3 R	99	(Austria) Martin Ragginger		All
(Germany) Precote Herberth Motorsport	Porsche 911 GT3 R	99	(Germany) Robert Renauer		All

Icon	Legend
J	Junior
T	Trophy

== Race calendar and results ==
The seven-event calendar for the 2015 season was announced on 13 November 2015. It was held along with the Deutsche Tourenwagen Masters at the Lausitzring.

Round		Circuit	Date	Pole position	Race winner
1	R1	(Germany) Motorsport Arena Oschersleben	16 April	(Germany) No. 29 Montaplast by Land-Motorsport	(Germany) No. 1 AMG - Team Zakspeed
1	R1	(Germany) Motorsport Arena Oschersleben	16 April	(Germany) Christopher Mies (United States) Connor De Phillippi	(Germany) Sebastian Asch (Germany) Luca Ludwig
1	R2	(Germany) Motorsport Arena Oschersleben	17 April	(Germany) No. 1 AMG - Team Zakspeed	(Austria) No. 63 GRT Grasser Racing Team
1	R2	(Germany) Motorsport Arena Oschersleben	17 April	(Germany) Sebastian Asch (Germany) Luca Ludwig	(Germany) Christian Engelhart (Switzerland) Rolf Ineichen
2	R1	(Germany) Sachsenring	30 April	(Austria) No. 16 GRT Grasser Racing Team	(Germany) No. 1 AMG - Team Zakspeed
2	R1	(Germany) Sachsenring	30 April	(Germany) Luca Stolz (Austria) Gerhard Tweraser	(Germany) Sebastian Asch (Germany) Luca Ludwig
2	R2	(Germany) Sachsenring	1 May	(Germany) No. 1 AMG - Team Zakspeed	(Germany) No. 77 Callaway Competition
2	R2	(Germany) Sachsenring	1 May	(Germany) Sebastian Asch (Germany) Luca Ludwig	(France) Jules Gounon (Germany) Daniel Keilwitz
3	R1	(Germany) Lausitzring	4 June	(Germany) No. 99 Precote Herberth Motorsport	(Germany) No. 99 Precote Herberth Motorsport
3	R1	(Germany) Lausitzring	4 June	(Austria) Martin Ragginger (Germany) Robert Renauer	(Austria) Martin Ragginger (Germany) Robert Renauer
3	R2	(Germany) Lausitzring	5 June	(Germany) No. 69 Callaway Competition	(Germany) No. 77 Callaway Competition
3	R2	(Germany) Lausitzring	5 June	(Germany) Patrick Assenheimer (Germany) Dominik Schwager	(France) Jules Gounon (Germany) Daniel Keilwitz
4	R1	(Austria) Red Bull Ring	23 July	(Germany) No. 7 Bentley Team Abt	(Germany) No. 17 KÜS Team75 Bernhard
4	R1	(Austria) Red Bull Ring	23 July	(Germany) Daniel Abt (South Africa) Jordan Pepper	(France) Kévin Estre (Germany) David Jahn
4	R2	(Austria) Red Bull Ring	24 July	(Germany) No. 77 Callaway Competition	(Germany) No. 77 Callaway Competition
4	R2	(Austria) Red Bull Ring	24 July	(France) Jules Gounon (Germany) Daniel Keilwitz	(France) Jules Gounon (Germany) Daniel Keilwitz
5	R1	(Germany) Nürburgring	6 August	(Germany) No. 99 Precote Herberth Motorsport	(Germany) No. 17 KÜS Team75 Bernhard
5	R1	(Germany) Nürburgring	6 August	(Austria) Martin Ragginger (Germany) Robert Renauer	(France) Kévin Estre (Germany) David Jahn
5	R2	(Germany) Nürburgring	7 August	(Germany) No. 17 KÜS Team75 Bernhard	(Germany) No. 29 Montaplast by Land-Motorsport
5	R2	(Germany) Nürburgring	7 August	(France) Kévin Estre (Germany) David Jahn	(Germany) Christopher Mies (United States) Connor De Phillippi
6	R1	(Netherlands) Circuit Park Zandvoort	20 August	(Germany) No. 29 Montaplast by Land-Motorsport	(Germany) No. 17 KÜS Team75 Bernhard
6	R1	(Netherlands) Circuit Park Zandvoort	20 August	(Germany) Christopher Mies (United States) Connor De Phillippi	(France) Kévin Estre (Germany) David Jahn
6	R2	(Netherlands) Circuit Park Zandvoort	21 August	(Germany) No. 17 KÜS Team75 Bernhard	(Germany) No. 50 YACO Racing
6	R2	(Netherlands) Circuit Park Zandvoort	21 August	(France) Kévin Estre (Germany) David Jahn	(Switzerland) Rahel Frey (Germany) Philip Geipel
7	R1	(Germany) Hockenheimring	1 October	(Germany) No. 29 Montaplast by Land-Motorsport	(Germany) No. 17 KÜS Team75 Bernhard
7	R1	(Germany) Hockenheimring	1 October	(Germany) Christopher Mies (United States) Connor De Phillippi	(France) Kévin Estre (Germany) David Jahn
7	R2	(Germany) Hockenheimring	2 October	(Germany) No. 99 Precote Herberth Motorsport	(Germany) No. 99 Precote Herberth Motorsport
7	R2	(Germany) Hockenheimring	2 October	(Austria) Martin Ragginger (Germany) Robert Renauer	(Austria) Martin Ragginger (Germany) Robert Renauer

== Championship standings ==
Scoring system

Championship points were awarded for the first ten positions in each race. Entries were required to complete 75% of the winning car's race distance in order to be classified and earn points. Individual drivers were required to participate for a minimum of 25 minutes in order to earn championship points in any race.

Position	**1st**	**2nd**	**3rd**	**4th**	**5th**	**6th**	**7th**	**8th**	**9th**	**10th**
Points	25	18	15	12	10	8	6	4	2	1

=== Drivers' championships ===
Pos.	Driver	Team	OSC (Germany)		SAC (Germany)		LAU (Germany)		RBR (Austria)		NÜR (Germany)		ZAN (Netherlands)		HOC (Germany)		Points
1	(Germany) Christopher Mies (United States) Connor De Phillippi	(Germany) Montaplast by Land-Motorsport	**2**	2	2	7	6	3	Ret	6	18	1	**2**	4	**2**	8	168
2	(Germany) David Jahn	(Germany) KÜS Team75 Bernhard	13	24	8	14	24	4	1	5	1	**3**	1	**Ret**	1	2	159
3	(France) Jules Gounon (Germany) Daniel Keilwitz	(Germany) Callaway Competition	7	Ret	4	1	4	1	3	**1**	5	Ret	8	5	6	Ret	152
4	(France) Kévin Estre	(Germany) KÜS Team75 Bernhard							1	5	1	**3**	1	**Ret**	1	2	143
5	(Austria) Martin Ragginger (Germany) Robert Renauer	(Germany) Precote Herberth Motorsport	4	6	Ret	15	**1**	Ret	Ret	Ret	**2**	4	3	6	Ret	**1**	123
6	(Germany) Sebastian Asch (Germany) Luca Ludwig	(Germany) AMG - Team Zakspeed	1	**22**	1	**8**	32	24	5	3	17	5	Ret	3	7	12	110
7	(Germany) Christian Engelhart (Switzerland) Rolf Ineichen	(Austria) GRT Grasser Racing Team	8	1	12	28	2	Ret	6	4	8	7	20	19	9	4	91
8	(Germany) Philip Geipel	(Germany) YACO Racing	20	12	9	2	Ret	22	12	8	Ret	9	12	1	Ret	6	59
9	(Switzerland) Rahel Frey	(Germany) YACO Racing	20	12	9	2	Ret	22			Ret	9	12	1	Ret	6	55
10	(Germany) Patrick Assenheimer (Germany) Dominik Schwager	(Germany) Callaway Competition	11	9	19	13	3	**2**	4	Ret	10	27	Ret	12	11	7	54
11	(Germany) Christer Jöns	(Germany) Bentley Team Abt	14	23	27	4	30	17	2	7	Ret	18	6	DNS	5	16	54
12	(Switzerland) Nikolaj Rogivue	(Germany) AMG - Team Zakspeed	10	4	25	18	10	14	7	18	3	28	DNS	Ret	8	3	54
13	(Germany) Fabian Hamprecht	(Germany) Bentley Team Abt	21	27	5	25	20	Ret	2	7	Ret	18	6	DNS	5	16	52
14	(Germany) Marvin Dienst	(Germany) BigFM Racing Team Schütz Motorsport	17	26	16	11	11	5	16	Ret	26	8	4	Ret	3	5	51
15	(Germany) Florian Stoll	(Germany) kfzteile24 APR Motorsport	9	3	17	3	13	23	EX	EX	Ret	2	(Note: Due to a breach of the DMSB Sporting Regulations both cars of kfzteile24 APR Motorsport were excluded from both races at the Red Bull Ring, after it was found that the intake systems both cars were using, did not resemble the intake systems they should have used. The DMSB Court found that the team was wrong with their interpretation of regulations and has therefore issued a further penalty, besides the exclusion by the stewards at the Red Bull Ring. The DMSB suspended the team for the last two rounds of the championship.)				50
16	(Belgium) Laurens Vanthoor	(Germany) kfzteile24 APR Motorsport	9	3	17	3			EX	EX	Ret	2					50
17	(Germany) Christopher Haase	(Germany) Car Collection Motorsport	23	5	13	10	7	12	18	Ret	9	10					48
17	(Germany) Christopher Haase	(Germany) Montaplast by Land-Motorsport											5	7	4	14	48
18	(Switzerland) Christopher Zanella	(Germany) BigFM Racing Team Schütz Motorsport	17	26	16	11	11	5	16	Ret			4	Ret	3	5	47
19	(Germany) Daniel Abt	(Germany) Bentley Team Abt	14	23	27	4	30	17	**DNS**	2	4	11	10	21	14	9	45
20	(Denmark) Nicolai Sylvest	(Germany) AMG - Team Zakspeed			25	18	10	14	7	18	3	28	DNS	Ret	8	3	41
21	(Germany) Luca Stolz	(Austria) GRT Grasser Racing Team	29	13	**7**	5	5	7	10	10	Ret	25	11	14			34
22	(South Africa) Jordan Pepper	(Germany) Bentley Team Abt	15	18	20	Ret	17	Ret	**DNS**	2	4	11	10	21	14	9	33
23	(Netherlands) Jaap van Lagen	(Austria) HB Racing WDS Bau	19	11	15	9	27	21	21	12	7	14	7	2	Ret	11	32
24	(Austria) Norbert Siedler	(Austria) HB Racing WDS Bau	19	11	15	9	27	21	21	12	7	14	7	2			32
25	(Germany) Markus Pommer	(Germany) Phoenix Racing	6	7	6	12	31	13	Ret	15							30
25	(Germany) Markus Pommer	(Germany) Aust Motorsport									6	21	17	20			30
25	(Germany) Markus Pommer	(Austria) HB Racing WDS Bau													Ret	11	30
26	(Finland) Jesse Krohn	(Germany) Schubert Motorsport	5	8	21	29	28	6	20	Ret	23	12	9	8	12	15	28
27	(Austria) Daniel Dobitsch (Sweden) Edward Sandström	(Germany) kfzteile24 APR Motorsport	18	Ret	3	6	8	16	EX	EX	15	13					27
28	(Belgium) Frédéric Vervisch	(Germany) Montaplast by Land-Motorsport					26	18	Ret	23	22	6	5	7			24
29	(Netherlands) Peter Hoevenaars	(Germany) Montaplast by Land-Motorsport	3	21	14	22	26	18	Ret	23	22	6					23
30	(Germany) Markus Winkelhock	(Germany) Phoenix Racing	6	7	6	12	31	13	Ret	15	25	Ret					22
31	(Germany) Marc Basseng	(Germany) Montaplast by Land-Motorsport	3	21	14	22											19
31	(Germany) Marc Basseng	(Germany) YACO Racing							12	8							19
31	(Germany) Marc Basseng	(Germany) Car Collection Motorsport													Ret	21	19
32	(Austria) Gerhard Tweraser	(Austria) GRT Grasser Racing Team	29	13	**7**	5	16	Ret	10	10	Ret	25					18
33	(Netherlands) Christiaan Frankenhout	(Germany) Car Collection Motorsport	23	5	13	10	7	12	18	Ret							17
33	(Netherlands) Christiaan Frankenhout	(Germany) MRS GT-Racing									24	23	18	15	18	17	17
34	(Italy) Mirko Bortolotti	(Austria) GRT Grasser Racing Team					5	7					11	14			16
35	(Germany) Martin Tomczyk	(Germany) Schubert Motorsport	5	8											12	15	14
36	(Switzerland) Louis Delétraz	(Germany) Schubert Motorsport			21	29	28	6			23	12	9	8			14
37	(Sweden) Felix Rosenqvist	(Germany) AMG - Team Zakspeed	10	4													13
38	(Monaco) Stéphane Ortelli	(Germany) Montaplast by Land-Motorsport													4	14	12
39	(Italy) Matteo Cairoli	(Germany) KÜS Team75 Bernhard					24	4									12
40	(United Kingdom) Guy Smith	(Germany) Bentley Team Abt	21	27	5	25	20	Ret									10
41	(Netherlands) Xavier Maassen	(Germany) Aust Motorsport	12	20	11	21	22	9	Ret	11	6	21	17	20			10
42	(Austria) Klaus Bachler	(Germany) KÜS Team75 Bernhard			8	14											8
42	(Austria) Klaus Bachler	(Germany) BigFM Racing Team Schütz Motorsport									26	8					8
43	(Finland) Patrick Kujala (Serbia) Miloš Pavlović	(Italy) Bonaldi Motorsport	22	25	Ret	17	9	8	Ret	21	Ret	19	Ret	10			7
44	(Germany) Sven Barth (Switzerland) Remo Lips	(Germany) RWT Racing	30	14	18	27	21	Ret	8	17	21	26	13	22	13	10	5
45	(United States) Boris Said	(Germany) Callaway Competition	24	19			25	10	9	22							3
46	(Germany) Dennis Busch	(Germany) Car Collection Motorsport									9	10					3
47	(Germany) Lukas Schreier	(Germany) Aust Motorsport	12	20	11	21	22	9	Ret	11							2
48	(Germany) Elia Erhart (Netherlands) Kelvin Snoeks	(Austria) HB Racing WDS Bau	28	16	22	Ret	15	Ret	13	9	20	20	16	11	Ret	18	2
49	(United States) Eric Curran	(Germany) Callaway Competition							9	22			Ret	16			2
50	(Germany) Claudia Hürtgen	(Germany) Schubert Motorsport					Ret	20					21	9			2
51	(Netherlands) Jeroen den Boer	(Germany) Schubert Motorsport											21	9			2
52	(Sweden) Mikaela Åhlin-Kottulinsky	(Germany) Aust Motorsport	Ret	17	23	24	19	11	17	20	11	17	15	18	10	19	1
53	(Germany) Florian Spengler (San Marino) Emanuele Zonzini	(Italy) Bonaldi Motorsport	Ret	15	10	19	12	19	Ret	Ret	13	16	19	Ret	Ret	13	1
54	(South Africa) Kelvin van der Linde (Spain) Isaac Tutumlu	(Germany) Car Collection Motorsport	27	10	24	20	29	Ret	Ret	16	12	24					1
55	(Netherlands) Loris Hezemans	(Germany) Callaway Competition	24	19			25	10					Ret	16			1
56	(Germany) Pierre Kaffer	(Germany) Aust Motorsport													10	19	1
	(Italy) Marco Bonanomi	(Germany) Aust Motorsport	Ret	17	23	24	19	11	17	20	11	17	15	18			0
	(Germany) Andreas Weishaupt	(Germany) Bentley Team Abt	15	18	20	Ret	17	Ret	11	Ret	14	15	DNS	17	15	Ret	0
	(Germany) Marco Holzer	(Germany) Bentley Team Abt							11	Ret	14	15	DNS	17	15	Ret	0
	(Germany) André Gies (Finland) Emil Lindholm	(Germany) ADAC NSA / Attempto Racing	25	Ret	26	26	18	15	15	13	16	Ret	14	13	17	Ret	0
	(Netherlands) Robin Frijns	(Germany) kfzteile24 APR Motorsport					13	23									0
	(New Zealand) Chris van der Drift	(Germany) KÜS Team75 Bernhard	13	24													0
	(Switzerland) Patric Niederhauser (Italy) Daniel Zampieri	(Germany) ADAC NSA / Attempto Racing	16	Ret	Ret	16	14	Ret									0
	(Germany) Nicolas Pohler	(Austria) GRT Grasser Racing Team					16	Ret	14	19							0
	(Germany) Florian Scholze	(Germany) Car Collection Motorsport	WD	WD	WD	WD			19	14	19	22					0
	(Austria) Karl Wendlinger	(Germany) Car Collection Motorsport							19	14	19	22					0
	(Italy) Michele Beretta	(Austria) GRT Grasser Racing Team							14	19							0
	(Germany) Marc Gassner	(Germany) MRS GT-Racing									24	23	18	15	18	17	0
	(Germany) Steve Feige (Netherlands) Bas Schothorst	(Germany) MRS GT-Racing	26	Ret	Ret	23	23	Ret	Ret	Ret							0
	(Germany) Steve Feige (Netherlands) Bas Schothorst	(Germany) Aust Motorsport													16	22	0
	(Germany) Maximilian Hackländer (Switzerland) Lucas Mauron	(Germany) Callaway Competition													19	20	0
	(Germany) Niklas Mackschin	(Germany) Schubert Motorsport					Ret	20									0
	(Portugal) António Félix da Costa	(Germany) Schubert Motorsport							20	Ret							0
	(Germany) Max Edelhoff	(Germany) Car Collection Motorsport													Ret	21	0
	(Denmark) Nicolaj Møller Madsen	(Germany) Phoenix Racing									25	Ret					0
	(Germany) Dominic Jöst	(Germany) Car Collection Motorsport	WD	WD	WD	WD											0
Pos.	Driver	Team	OSC (Germany)		SAC (Germany)		LAU (Germany)		RBR (Austria)		NÜR (Germany)		ZAN (Netherlands)		HOC (Germany)		Points

Key
Colour	Result
Gold	Race winner
Silver	2nd place
Bronze	3rd place
Green	Points finish
Blue	Non-points finish
Blue	Non-classified finish (NC)
Purple	Did not finish (Ret)
Black	Disqualified (DSQ)
Black	Excluded (EX)
White	Did not start (DNS)
White	Race cancelled (C)
White	Withdrew (WD)
Blank	Did not participate

**Bold** – Pole
Italics – Fastest Lap

==== Junior class ====
Pos.	Driver	Team	OSC (Germany)		SAC (Germany)		LAU (Germany)		RBR (Austria)		NÜR (Germany)		ZAN (Netherlands)		HOC (Germany)		Points
1	(United States) Connor De Phillippi	(Germany) Montaplast by Land-Motorsport	**2**	**2**	2	7	6	3	Ret	6	18	**1**	**2**	**4**	**2**	8	248
2	(France) Jules Gounon	(Germany) Callaway Competition	7	Ret	4	1	4	1	3	**1**	5	Ret	8	5	6	Ret	201
3	(Germany) Patrick Assenheimer	(Germany) Callaway Competition	11	9	19	13	**3**	**2**	4	Ret	10	27	Ret	12	11	7	140
4	(Switzerland) Nikolaj Rogivue	(Germany) AMG - Team Zakspeed	10	4	25	**18**	10	14	7	18	**3**	28	DNS	Ret	8	3	120
5	(Germany) Marvin Dienst	(Germany) BigFM Racing Team Schütz Motorsport	17	26	16	11	11	5	16	Ret	26	8	4	Ret	2	**5**	109
6	(Germany) Luca Stolz	(Austria) GRT Grasser Racing Team	29	13	**7**	5	5	7	10	10	Ret	25	11	14			102
7	(Germany) Fabian Hamprecht	(Germany) Bentley Team Abt	21	27	5	25	20	Ret	2	7	Ret	18	6	DNS	5	16	96
8	(Denmark) Nicolai Sylvest	(Germany) AMG - Team Zakspeed			25	**18**	10	14	7	18	**3**	28	DNS	Ret	8	3	90
9	(South Africa) Jordan Pepper	(Germany) Bentley Team Abt	15	18	20	Ret	17	Ret	**DNS**	2	4	11	10	21	14	9	88
10	(San Marino) Emanuele Zonzini	(Italy) Bonaldi Motorsport	Ret	15	10	19	12	19	Ret	Ret	13	16	19	Ret	Ret	13	55
11	(Netherlands) Peter Hoevenaars	(Germany) Montaplast by Land-Motorsport	3	21	14	22	26	18	Ret	23	22	6					46
12	(Sweden) Mikaela Åhlin-Kottulinsky	(Germany) Aust Motorsport	Ret	17	23	24	19	11	17	20	11	17	15	18	10	19	46
13	(Finland) Patrick Kujala	(Italy) Bonaldi Motorsport	22	25	Ret	17	9	8	Ret	21	Ret	19	Ret	10			44
14	(Germany) André Gies (Finland) Emil Lindholm	(Germany) ADAC NSA / Attempto Racing	25	Ret	26	26	18	15	15	13	16	Ret	14	13			35
15	(Germany) Lukas Schreier	(Germany) Aust Motorsport	12	20	11	21	22	9	Ret	11							32
16	(Germany) Marc Gassner	(Germany) MRS GT-Racing									24	23	18	15	18	17	17
17	(Italy) Matteo Cairoli	(Germany) KÜS Team75 Bernhard					24	4									12
18	(Germany) Nicolas Pohler	(Austria) GRT Grasser Racing Team					16^{1}	Ret	14	19							10
19	(Italy) Michele Beretta	(Austria) GRT Grasser Racing Team							14	19							10
20	(Netherlands) Loris Hezemans	(Germany) Callaway Competition	24	19			25	10					Ret	16			10
21	(Switzerland) Lucas Mauron	(Germany) Callaway Competition													19	20	2
	(Germany) Max Edelhoff	(Germany) Car Collection Motorsport													Ret	21	0
	(Germany) Niklas Mackschin	(Germany) Schubert Motorsport					Ret	20									0
	(Denmark) Nicolaj Møller Madsen	(Germany) Phoenix Racing									25	Ret					0
Pos.	Driver	Team	OSC (Germany)		SAC (Germany)		LAU (Germany)		RBR (Austria)		NÜR (Germany)		ZAN (Netherlands)		HOC (Germany)		Points

Notes

- ^{1} – Nicolas Pohler was a guest driver at Lausitzring and therefore did not score points.

==== Trophy class ====
Pos.	Driver	Team	Points
1	(Switzerland) Remo Lips	(Germany) RWT Racing	298.5
2	(Switzerland) Rolf Ineichen	(Austria) GRT Grasser Racing Team	283
3	(Germany) Andreas Weishaupt	(Germany) Bentley Team Abt	183
4	(Germany) Steve Feige	(Germany) MRS GT-Racing (Germany) Aust Motorsport	111
5	(Netherlands) Jeroen den Boer	(Germany) Schubert Motorsport	60
6	(Germany) Florian Scholze	(Germany) Car Collection Motorsport	60
	(Germany) Dominic Jöst	(Germany) Car Collection Motorsport	0

=== Teams' championship ===
Pos.	Team	Manufacturer	OSC (Germany)		SAC (Germany)		LAU (Germany)		RBR (Austria)		NÜR (Germany)		ZAN (Netherlands)		HOC (Germany)		Points
1	(Germany) Montaplast by Land-Motorsport	Audi	**2**	2	2	7	6	3	Ret	6	18	1	**2**	4	**2**	8	177
2	(Germany) Callaway Competition	Chevrolet	7	9	4	1	3	**1**	3	**1**	5	27	8	5	6	7	169
3	(Germany) KÜS Team75 Bernhard	Porsche	13	24	8	14	24	4	1	5	1	**3**	1	**Ret**	1	2	163
4	(Germany) AMG - Team Zakspeed	Mercedes-Benz	1	**4**	1	**8**	10	14	5	3	3	5	Ret	3	7	3	162
5	(Austria) GRT Grasser Racing Team	Lamborghini	8	1	**7**	5	2	7	6	4	8	7	11	14	9	4	128
6	(Germany) Precote Herberth Motorsport	Porsche	4	6	Ret	15	**1**	Ret	Ret	Ret	**2**	4	3	6	Ret	**1**	126
7	(Germany) Bentley Team Abt	Bentley	14	18	5	4	17	17	**2**	2	4	11	6	17	5	9	95
8	(Germany) kfzteile24 APR Motorsport	Audi	9	3	3	3	8	16	EX	EX	15	2					75
9	(Germany) YACO Racing	Audi	20	12	9	2	Ret	22	12	8	Ret	9	12	1	Ret	6	70
10	(Germany) BigFM Racing Team Schütz Motorsport	Porsche	17	26	16	11	11	5	16	Ret	26	8	4	Ret	3	5	59
11	(Austria) HB Racing WDS Bau	Lamborghini	19	11	15	9	15	21	13	9	7	14	7	2	Ret	11	45
12	(Germany) Schubert Motorsport	BMW	5	8	21	29	28	6	20	Ret	23	12	9	8	12	15	38
13	(Germany) Car Collection Motorsport	Audi/Mercedes-Benz	27	5	13	10	7	12	18	14	9	10			Ret	21	28
14	(Germany) Phoenix Racing	Audi	6	7	6	12	31	13	Ret	15	25	Ret					25
15	(Germany) Aust Motorsport	Audi	12	17	11	21	19	9	17	11	6	17	15	18	10	19	20
16	(Italy) Bonaldi Motorsport	Lamborghini	22	15	10	17	9	8	Ret	21	13	16	19	10	Ret	13	18
17	(Germany) RWT Racing	Chevrolet	30	14	18	27	21	Ret	8	17	21	26	13	22	13	10	10
18	(Germany) ADAC NSA / Attempto Racing	Lamborghini	16	Ret	26	16	14	15	15	13	16	Ret	14	13	17	Ret	6
	(Germany) MRS GT-Racing	Nissan	26	Ret	Ret	23	23	Ret	Ret	Ret	24	23	18	15	18	17	0
Pos.	Driver	Team	OSC (Germany)		SAC (Germany)		LAU (Germany)		RBR (Austria)		NÜR (Germany)		ZAN (Netherlands)		HOC (Germany)		Points
