= Ivan Taranov =

Ivan Taranov is the name of:

- Ivan Taranov (footballer) (born 1986), Russian footballer
- Ivan Taranov (racing driver) (born 1994), Russian racing driver
