= 2015 Porsche Carrera Cup Great Britain =

One-make racing championship in Belgium and UK

The 2015 Porsche Carrera Cup Great Britain was a multi-event, one-make motor racing championship held across England, Belgium and Scotland. The championship featured a mix of professional motor racing teams and privately funded drivers, competing in Porsche 911 GT3 cars that conformed to the technical regulations for the championship. It formed part of the extensive program of support categories built up around the BTCC centrepiece. The 2015 season was the thirteenth Porsche Carrera Cup Great Britain season, commencing on 4 April at Brands Hatch – on the circuit's Indy configuration – and finished on 11 October at the same venue, utilising the Grand Prix circuit, after sixteen races at eight meetings. Fourteen of the races were held in support of the 2015 British Touring Car Championship season, with a round in support of the 2015 FIA World Endurance Championship.

With eleven victories and five second-place finishes from the sixteen races, Redline Racing driver Dan Cammish was the winner of the overall drivers' championship. Cammish, who at one point won 6 consecutive races, finished nearly 100 points clear of his next closest rival, team-mate Michael Meadows who was running under the Samsung SUHD TV Racing banner. Meadows took ten podium finishes, but only one victory, coming at Oulton Park. The championship top three was completed by defending champion Josh Webster (Team Parker Racing), who like Meadows, took one victory during the season, at Spa-Francorchamps. The only other drivers to win races were IDL Racing's Tom Sharp at Brands Hatch and GT Marques driver Dino Zamparelli, who swept the Silverstone weekend. In the Pro-Am classes, despite taking fewer class wins than Jordan Witt (Redline Racing), Juta Racing driver Ignas Gelžinis won the Pro-Am 1 title by five points. While in Pro-Am 2, six class wins were enough for John McCullagh to complete a championship sweep for Redline Racing.

== Entry list ==
Team	No.	Driver	Rounds
Team Parker Racing	1	(United Kingdom) Josh Webster	All
Team Parker Racing	11	(United Kingdom) Stephen Jelley	All
Samsung SUHD TV Racing	3	(United Kingdom) James Sutton	5–6
Samsung SUHD TV Racing	17	(Canada) Daniel Morad	7–8
Samsung SUHD TV Racing	18	(Canada) Nicholas Latifi	1–4
Samsung SUHD TV Racing	87	(United Kingdom) Michael Meadows	All
IDL Racing	10	(United Kingdom) Tom Sharp	All
IN2 Racing	25	(Spain) Víctor Jiménez	1–4
Redline Racing	27	(United Kingdom) Dan Cammish	All
G-Cat Racing	32	(United Kingdom) Ryan Cullen	1–5
Brookspeed	40	(South Africa) Jayde Kruger	All
Parr Motorsport	77	(United Kingdom) Paul Rees	1–4, 6–8
Parr Motorsport	88	(United Kingdom) Dino Zamparelli	1–6
GT Marques	88	(United Kingdom) Dino Zamparelli	7–8
Pro-Am 1
Juta Racing	8	(Lithuania) Ignas Gelžinis	All
Credit4Cars	12	(United Kingdom) Chris Dockerill	1–7
IN2 Racing	24	(United Kingdom) Tom Bradshaw	7–8
IN2 Racing	91	(United Kingdom) Daniel McKay	6–8
Redline Racing	26	(United Kingdom) Jordan Witt	All
Redline Racing	47	(United Kingdom) Jack Falla	All
G-Cat Racing	30	(United Kingdom) Peter Jennings	1–2
Parr Motorsport	34	(United Kingdom) Mark Cole	1–4, 6–8
Team Parker Racing	36	(Republic of Ireland) Karl Leonard	1–4
Pro-Am 2
Credit4Cars	4	(United Kingdom) Peter Parsons	All
Credit4Cars	23	(United Kingdom) Iain Dockerill	All
Juta Racing	13	(Lithuania) Tautvydas Barštys	All
Juta Racing	14	(Lithuania) Nerijus Dagilis	2–8
Parr Motorsport	22	(United Kingdom) Peter Kyle-Henney	1–3
G-Cat Racing	30	(United Kingdom) Peter Jennings	3, 5–8
G-Cat Racing	31	(United Kingdom) Shamus Jennings	1–2, 4–8
Redline Racing	33	(United Kingdom) John McCullagh	All
IN2 Racing	42	(United Kingdom) Graeme Mundy	2–3
IN2 Racing	50	(United Kingdom) Paul McKay	1–2
Team Parker Racing	49	(United Kingdom) Rupert Martin	All
GT Marques	57	(United Kingdom) Francis Galashan	All
GT Marques	69	(United Kingdom) Scott Marshall	1–3

Icon	Class
PA1	Pro-Am 1
PA2	Pro-Am 2

== Race calendar and results ==
The calendar was announced by the championship organisers on 5 November 2014. The championship was reduced from 19 rounds in 2014 to 16 rounds, including two races at Circuit de Spa-Francorchamps in support of the FIA World Endurance Championship. It was the only round outside the United Kingdom; all other rounds were held in support of the 2015 British Touring Car Championship season.

Round		Circuit	Date	Pole position	Fastest lap	Winning driver	Winning team
1	R1	Brands Hatch (Indy Circuit, Kent)	4 April	(United Kingdom) Stephen Jelley	(United Kingdom) Stephen Jelley	(United Kingdom) Dan Cammish	Redline Racing
1	R2	Brands Hatch (Indy Circuit, Kent)	5 April	(United Kingdom) Stephen Jelley	(United Kingdom) Stephen Jelley	(United Kingdom) Dan Cammish	Redline Racing
2	R3	(Belgium) Circuit de Spa-Francorchamps (Stavelot)	1 May	(United Kingdom) Josh Webster	(United Kingdom) Dan Cammish	(United Kingdom) Josh Webster	Team Parker Racing
2	R4	(Belgium) Circuit de Spa-Francorchamps (Stavelot)	2 May	(United Kingdom) Josh Webster	(United Kingdom) Dan Cammish	(United Kingdom) Dan Cammish	Redline Racing
3	R5	Oulton Park (Island Circuit, Cheshire)	6 June	(United Kingdom) Dan Cammish	(United Kingdom) Michael Meadows	(United Kingdom) Dan Cammish	Redline Racing
3	R6	Oulton Park (Island Circuit, Cheshire)	7 June	(United Kingdom) Michael Meadows	(United Kingdom) Michael Meadows	(United Kingdom) Michael Meadows	Samsung SUHD TV Racing
4	R7	Croft Circuit (North Yorkshire)	28 June	(United Kingdom) Dan Cammish	(United Kingdom) Dan Cammish	(United Kingdom) Dan Cammish	Redline Racing
4	R8	Croft Circuit (North Yorkshire)	28 June	(United Kingdom) Dan Cammish	(United Kingdom) Dan Cammish	(United Kingdom) Dan Cammish	Redline Racing
5	R9	Snetterton Circuit (300 Circuit, Norfolk)	9 August	(United Kingdom) Dan Cammish	(United Kingdom) Dan Cammish	(United Kingdom) Dan Cammish	Redline Racing
5	R10	Snetterton Circuit (300 Circuit, Norfolk)	9 August	(United Kingdom) Dan Cammish	(United Kingdom) Dan Cammish	(United Kingdom) Dan Cammish	Redline Racing
6	R11	Knockhill Racing Circuit (Fife)	23 August	(United Kingdom) Josh Webster	(United Kingdom) Michael Meadows	(United Kingdom) Dan Cammish	Redline Racing
6	R12	Knockhill Racing Circuit (Fife)	23 August	(United Kingdom) Dan Cammish	(United Kingdom) James Sutton	(United Kingdom) Dan Cammish	Redline Racing
7	R13	Silverstone Circuit (National Circuit, Northamptonshire)	26 September	(United Kingdom) Michael Meadows	(United Kingdom) Dino Zamparelli	(United Kingdom) Dino Zamparelli	GT Marques
7	R14	Silverstone Circuit (National Circuit, Northamptonshire)	27 September	(United Kingdom) Michael Meadows	(United Kingdom) Tom Sharp	(United Kingdom) Dino Zamparelli	GT Marques
8	R15	Brands Hatch (Grand Prix Circuit, Kent)	10 October	(United Kingdom) Dan Cammish	(United Kingdom) Dan Cammish	(United Kingdom) Dan Cammish	Redline Racing
8	R16	Brands Hatch (Grand Prix Circuit, Kent)	11 October	(United Kingdom) Tom Sharp	(United Kingdom) Dino Zamparelli	(United Kingdom) Tom Sharp	IDL Racing

== Championship standings ==
Points system
	**1st**	**2nd**	**3rd**	**4th**	**5th**	**6th**	**7th**	**8th**	**9th**	**10th**	**11th**	**12th**	**13th**	**14th**	**15th**	PP	FL
Finishers	20	18	16	14	12	10	9	8	7	6	5	4	3	2	1	1	1
Pro-Am	10	9	8	7	6	5	4	3	2	1						1	1

=== Drivers' championships ===
==== Overall championship ====
Pos	Driver	BHI		SPA		OUL		CRO		SNE		KNO		SIL		BHGP		Pts
1	(United Kingdom) Dan Cammish	1	1	2	1	**1**	2	**1**	**1**	**1**	**1**	1	**1**	2	2	**1**	2	324
2	(United Kingdom) Michael Meadows	3	2	Ret	3	18	**1**	3	2	3	3	2	3	**3**	**6**	5	5	226
3	(United Kingdom) Josh Webster	14	3	**1**	**2**	4	3	2	3	2	4	**Ret**	2	4	7	Ret	9	203
4	(United Kingdom) Tom Sharp	5	Ret	5	Ret	6	4	5	5	4	2	6	6	5	3	2	**1**	192
5	(United Kingdom) Stephen Jelley	**2**	**4**	3	4	3	6	4	4	5	6	4	5	21	13	6	6	191
6	(United Kingdom) Dino Zamparelli	11	Ret	4	5	5	5	8	6	6	8	7	10	1	1	3	3	180
7	(South Africa) Jayde Kruger	9	6	13	8	Ret	10	10	14	11	7	5	7	13	4	4	4	122
8	(United Kingdom) Paul Rees	13	5	7	10	10	11	7	7			8	8	8	5	9	8	110
9	(United Kingdom) Jordan Witt	6	Ret	10	12	8	12	12	11	7	10	9	9	11	8	11	13	87
10	(Lithuania) Ignas Gelžinis	7	17	12	11	9	14	13	10	8	11	11	16	9	10	10	12	77
11	(Canada) Nicholas Latifi	4	7	11	7	2	16	6	9									72
12	(Spain) Víctor Jiménez	10	9	6	6	7	7	9	8									64
13	(United Kingdom) James Sutton									Ret	5	3	4					43
14	(United Kingdom) Ryan Cullen	Ret	8	8	9	Ret	9	Ret	Ret	9	9							40
15	(United Kingdom) Jack Falla	18	Ret	14	14	11	13	Ret	DNS	10	12	12	Ret	12	12	14	14	38
16	(Republic of Ireland) Karl Leonard	8	Ret	9	15	13	8	11	12									36
17	(United Kingdom) Mark Cole	12	Ret	15	13	12	17	14	13			10	12	Ret	11	12	15	35
18	(Canada) Daniel Morad													6	14	7	10	27
19	(United Kingdom) Tom Bradshaw													7	Ret	8	7	26
20	(United Kingdom) Daniel McKay											16	11	10	9	Ret	11	23
21	(United Kingdom) John McCullagh	Ret	10	18	23	15	Ret	15	15	13	14	Ret	17	16	15	16	16	15
22	(United Kingdom) Shamus Jennings	22	11	DNS	Ret			21	16	15	21	14	15	Ret	16	19	Ret	9
23	(Lithuania) Nerijus Dagilis			16	18	23	19	19	18	14	16	15	13	14	17	22	18	8
24	(United Kingdom) Chris Dockerill	Ret	DNS	24	21	21	Ret	18	Ret	19	13	13	Ret	15	18			7
25	(United Kingdom) Peter Jennings	Ret	DNS	22	Ret	19	21			12	17	21	14	17	22	13	19	6
26	(United Kingdom) Scott Marshall	20	12	23	26	14	Ret											6
27	(United Kingdom) Francis Galashan	17	13	DNS	24	22	Ret	16	Ret	16	19	18	18	19	19	21	21	3
28	(United Kingdom) Iain Dockerill	15	15	26	17	16	18	17	20	20	15	22	20	Ret	20	17	Ret	3
29	(United Kingdom) Paul McKay	16	14	17	Ret													2
30	(United Kingdom) Graeme Mundy			DNS	16	20	15											1
31	(United Kingdom) Rupert Martin	Ret	16	25	25	24	NC	Ret	Ret	21	Ret	20	21	20	23	20	20	0
32	(United Kingdom) Peter Parsons	19	Ret	21	22	Ret	20	Ret	19	17	18	19	22	18	Ret	18	Ret	0
33	(United Kingdom) Peter Kyle-Henney	Ret	DNS	19	20	Ret	DNS											0
34	(Lithuania) Tautvydas Barštys	21	Ret	20	19	17	Ret	20	17	18	20	17	19	Ret	21	15	17	−1
Pos	Driver	BHI		SPA		OUL		CRO		SNE		KNO		SIL		BHGP		Pts

Colour	Result
Gold	Winner
Silver	Second place
Bronze	Third place
Green	Points finish
Blue	Non-points finish
Blue	Non-classified finish (NC)
Purple	Retired (Ret)
Red	Did not qualify (DNQ)
Red	Did not pre-qualify (DNPQ)
Black	Disqualified (DSQ)
White	Did not start (DNS)
White	Withdrew (WD)
White	Race cancelled (C)
Blank	Did not practice (DNP)
Blank	Did not arrive (DNA)
Blank	Excluded (EX)

**Bold** – Pole
Italics – Fastest Lap

==== Pro-Am championships ====
Pos	Driver	BHI		SPA		OUL		CRO		SNE		KNO		SIL		BHGP		Pts
Pro-Am 1
1	(Lithuania) Ignas Gelžinis	7	17	12	11	9	14	**13**	**10**	8	**11**	**11**	16	**9**	**10**	10	**12**	154
2	(United Kingdom) Jordan Witt	**6**	**Ret**	10	12	8	12	12	11	**7**	10	9	**9**	11	8	**11**	13	149
3	(United Kingdom) Jack Falla	18	Ret	14	14	11	13	Ret	DNS	10	12	12	Ret	12	12	14	14	86
4	(United Kingdom) Mark Cole	12	Ret	15	13	12	17	14	13			10	12	Ret	11	12	15	84
5	(Republic of Ireland) Karl Leonard	8	Ret	**9**	**15**	**13**	**8**	11	12									64
6	(United Kingdom) Chris Dockerill	Ret	DNS	24	21	21	Ret	18	Ret	19	13	13	Ret	15	18			52
7	(United Kingdom) Daniel McKay											16	11	10	9	Ret	11	42
8	(United Kingdom) Peter Jennings	Ret	DNS	22	Ret													2
Pro-Am 2
1	(United Kingdom) John McCullagh	**Ret**	**10**	18	23	**15**	Ret	**15**	**15**	13	14	Ret	17	16	15	**16**	**16**	124
2	(Lithuania) Nerijus Dagilis			16	18	23	19	19	18	14	16	15	**13**	14	17	22	18	108
3	(United Kingdom) Iain Dockerill	15	15	26	17	16	18	17	20	20	15	22	20	Ret	20	17	Ret	90
4	(United Kingdom) Peter Jennings					19	**21**			12	**17**	21	14	**17**	**22**	13	19	83
5	(Lithuania) Tautvydas Barštys	21	Ret	20	19	17	Ret	20	17	**18**	20	17	19	Ret	21	15	17	83
6	(United Kingdom) Francis Galashan	17	13	DNS	24	22	Ret	16	Ret	16	19	**18**	18	19	19	21	21	77
7	(United Kingdom) Shamus Jennings	22	11	DNS	Ret			21	16	15	21	14	15	Ret	16	19	Ret	69
8	(United Kingdom) Peter Parsons	19	Ret	21	22	Ret	20	Ret	19	17	18	19	22	18	Ret	18	Ret	62
9	(United Kingdom) Rupert Martin	Ret	16	25	25	24	NC	Ret	Ret	21	Ret	20	21	20	23	20	20	39
10	(United Kingdom) Scott Marshall	20	12	23	26	14	Ret											29
11	(United Kingdom) Graeme Mundy			DNS	**16**	20	15											26
12	(United Kingdom) Paul McKay	16	14	17	Ret													24
13	(United Kingdom) Peter Kyle-Henney	Ret	DNS	**19**	20	Ret	DNS											15
Pos	Driver	BHI		SPA		OUL		CRO		SNE		KNO		SIL		BHGP		Pts

Colour	Result
Gold	Winner
Silver	Second place
Bronze	Third place
Green	Points finish
Blue	Non-points finish
Blue	Non-classified finish (NC)
Purple	Retired (Ret)
Red	Did not qualify (DNQ)
Red	Did not pre-qualify (DNPQ)
Black	Disqualified (DSQ)
White	Did not start (DNS)
White	Withdrew (WD)
White	Race cancelled (C)
Blank	Did not practice (DNP)
Blank	Did not arrive (DNA)
Blank	Excluded (EX)

**Bold** – Pole
Italics – Fastest Lap
