= Taranov =

Taranov (Russian: Таранов, from таран meaning ram, ramming) is a Russian masculine surname, its feminine counterpart is Taranova. It may refer to:

- Anastasiya Taranova-Potapova (born 1985), Russian triple jumper
- Ivan Taranov (footballer) (born 1986), Russian footballer
- Ivan Taranov (racing driver) (born 1994), Russian racing driver
- Yelena Taranova (born 1961), Azerbaijani paralympic sport shooter
