= 2014 GP3 Series =

Season of motor racing competitions

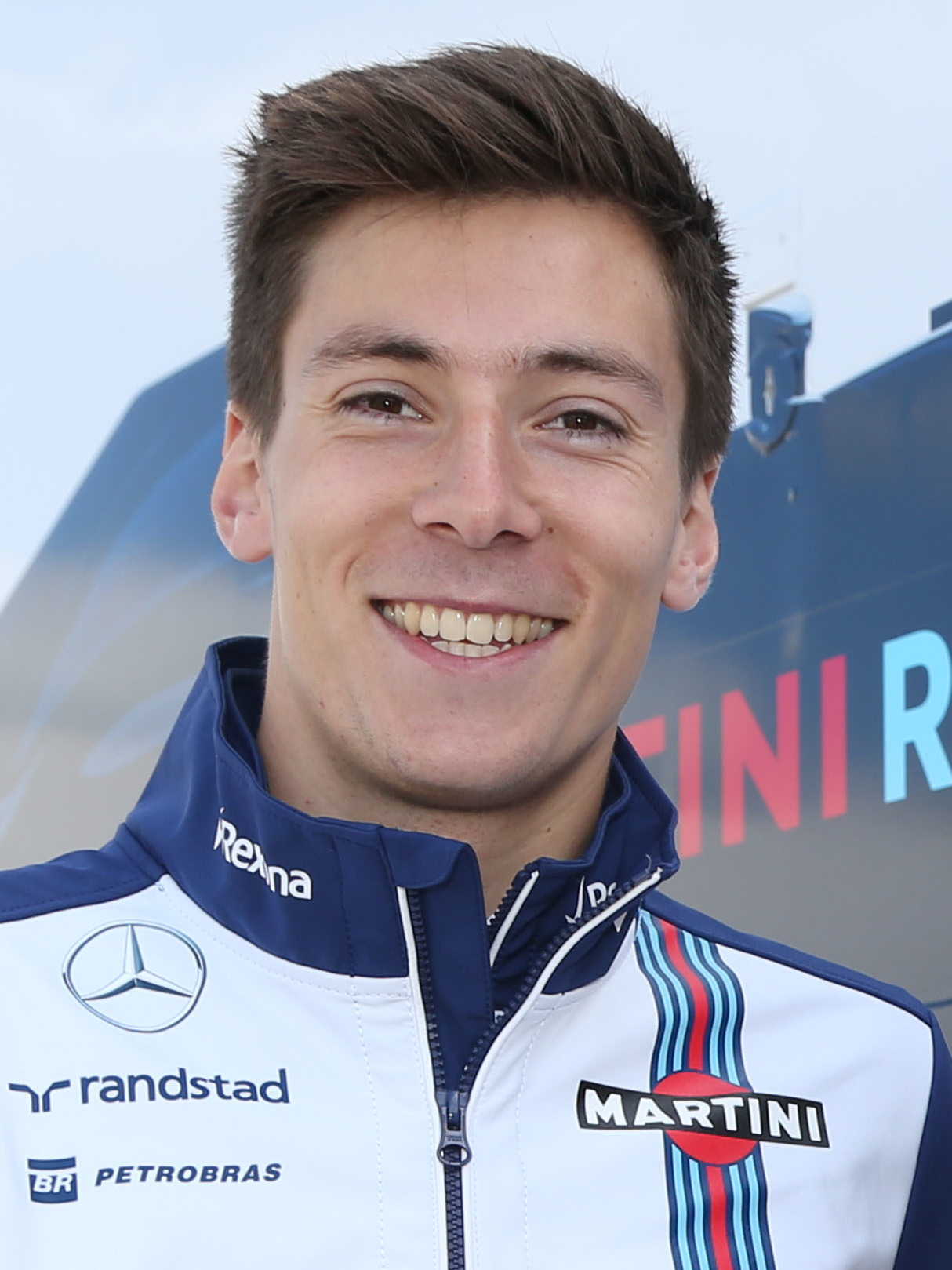
Alex Lynn (pictured in 2015), the series champion

The 2014 GP3 Series was the fifth season of GP3 Series, a third-tier motor racing feeder series for Formula One and sister series GP2. The series continued to use the Dallara GP3/13 car, AER V6 engines and Pirelli tyres.

The title was claimed by Red Bull Junior driver Alex Lynn; despite having fewer wins than Dean Stoneman, Lynn showed consistency to surpass him by 44 points.

This was the only season in the GP3 Series in which a team other than ART Grand Prix secured the constructors' title, with Carlin winning the teams' championship by 17 points over ART.

== Teams and drivers ==
The following teams competed in the 2014 season:

Team	No.	Driver name	Rounds
(France) ART Grand Prix	1	(Switzerland) Alex Fontana	All
(France) ART Grand Prix	2	(Germany) Marvin Kirchhöfer	All
(France) ART Grand Prix	3	(United Kingdom) Dino Zamparelli	All
(United Kingdom) Arden International	4	(Romania) Robert Vișoiu	All
(United Kingdom) Arden International	5	(Switzerland) Patric Niederhauser	All
(United Kingdom) Arden International	6	(United Kingdom) Jann Mardenborough	All
(Finland) Koiranen GP	7	(Spain) Carmen Jordá	1–7
(Finland) Koiranen GP	7	(United Kingdom) Dean Stoneman	8–9
(Finland) Koiranen GP	8	(Sweden) Jimmy Eriksson	All
(Finland) Koiranen GP	9	(Uruguay) Santiago Urrutia	All
(United Kingdom) Carlin	10	(United Kingdom) Alex Lynn	All
(United Kingdom) Carlin	11	(United Kingdom) Emil Bernstorff	All
(United Kingdom) Carlin	12	(Macau) Luís Sá Silva (Note: Sá Silva is an Angolan driver who competed under a Macanese licence as Angola was not permitted to grant Grade A licences.)	All
(United Kingdom) Marussia Manor Racing	14	(Finland) Patrick Kujala	1–7
(United Kingdom) Marussia Manor Racing	15	(United Kingdom) Ryan Cullen (Note: Cullen is an Irish driver who competed under a British racing licence.)	1–7
(United Kingdom) Marussia Manor Racing	16	(United Kingdom) Dean Stoneman	1–7
(Germany) Hilmer Motorsport	17	(Russia) Ivan Taranov	1
(Germany) Hilmer Motorsport	17	(Russia) Nikolay Martsenko	2, 8
(Germany) Hilmer Motorsport	17	(Germany) Sebastian Balthasar	3–7
(Germany) Hilmer Motorsport	18	(Canada) Nelson Mason	All
(Germany) Hilmer Motorsport	19	(Netherlands) Beitske Visser	1
(Germany) Hilmer Motorsport	19	(Italy) Riccardo Agostini	2–9
(Switzerland) Jenzer Motorsport	20	(Norway) Pål Varhaug	All
(Switzerland) Jenzer Motorsport	21	(Switzerland) Mathéo Tuscher	All
(Switzerland) Jenzer Motorsport	22	(Hong Kong) Adderly Fong	1–4
(Switzerland) Jenzer Motorsport	22	(Austria) Christopher Höher	5
(Switzerland) Jenzer Motorsport	22	(Italy) Kevin Ceccon	6–9
(Italy) Trident	23	(Brazil) Victor Carbone	1–4
(Italy) Trident	23	(Russia) Konstantin Tereshchenko	6
(Italy) Trident	23	(Italy) Luca Ghiotto	7
(Italy) Trident	23	(China) Kang Ling	9
(Italy) Trident	24	(South Africa) Roman de Beer	1–5
(Italy) Trident	24	(Sweden) John Bryant-Meisner	6–7
(Italy) Trident	24	(Finland) Patrick Kujala	8
(Italy) Trident	24	(United Kingdom) Ryan Cullen	9
(Italy) Trident	25	(Russia) Denis Nagulin	1
(Italy) Trident	25	(Australia) Mitchell Gilbert	3–5, 7–8
(Italy) Trident	25	(Italy) Luca Ghiotto	6
(Italy) Trident	25	(Finland) Patrick Kujala	9
(Canada) Status Grand Prix	26	(United Kingdom) Nick Yelloly	All
(Canada) Status Grand Prix	27	(New Zealand) Richie Stanaway	All
(Canada) Status Grand Prix	28	(Mexico) Alfonso Celis Jr.	All

=== Team changes ===
Bamboo Engineering left series after the last race of the 2013 season. Their place was due to be taken by GP2 Series champions Russian Time, but after Motopark Academy parted ways with the team following the death of team founder Igor Mazepa, their place was taken by GP2 Series team Hilmer Motorsport.

MW Arden changed its name to Arden International and was re-registered as a British, rather than an Australian team. The changes coincided with Mark Webber's retirement from Formula One and subsequent move to the FIA World Endurance Championship.

=== Driver changes ===
ART Grand Prix saw all three of their 2013 drivers leave the series; Conor Daly and Facu Regalia graduated to GP2, and Jack Harvey moved to Indy Lights. The team signed two returning drivers, Alex Fontana and Dino Zamparelli, who had previously driven for Jenzer and Marussia respectively, as well as German Formula Three champion Marvin Kirchhöfer, who joined last-minute from Russian Time.

Arden International signed two new drivers, as reigning champion Daniil Kvyat stepped up to Formula One, racing with Scuderia Toro Rosso, and Carlos Sainz Jr. moved to Formula Renault 3.5 Series. They were replaced by returning driver Patric Niederhauser, who previously raced for Jenzer, and Nissan GT Academy driver Jann Mardenborough.

Koiranen GP completely changed its lineup for 2014. Patrick Kujala and Dean Stoneman moved to Marussia, while Kevin Korjus moved to the European Le Mans Series. They were replaced by two returning drivers, Carmen Jordá and Jimmy Eriksson, who previously drove for Bamboo and Status respectively, and rookie Santiago Urrutia. Eriksson had initially signed for Russian Time.

Carlin also made two changes to their lineup. Nick Yelloly moved to Status, and Alexander Sims switched to the British GT Championship. They were replaced by two rookies, Red Bull Junior Team member Alex Lynn and Emil Bernstorff.

Marussia Manor Racing saw one of their 2013 drivers leave the series — Tio Ellinas graduated to the GP2 Series — whilst Dino Zamparelli moved to ART. They were replaced by Patrick Kujala and Dean Stoneman, who had both previously driven for Koiranen.

Russian Time had planned a lineup of Marvin Kirchhöfer, Jimmy Eriksson and Markus Pommer before the team collapsed. Kirchhöfer and Eriksson found new homes in GP3 with ART and Koiranen, while Pommer returned to Motopark's German Formula Three programme. Instead, Hilmer Motorsport brought three rookies to the series: Ivan Taranov, Nelson Mason and Beitske Visser.

Jenzer Motorsport brought a brand new lineup. Two of their 2013 drivers moved to other teams — Alex Fontana to ART and Patric Niederhauser to Arden — and Samin Gómez left the sport. Adderly Fong moved to the team from Status and was joined by rookie Mathéo Tuscher, and Pål Varhaug, who last competed in GP3 in 2010.

Trident also brought a new lineup for 2014. Robert Cregan left the sport, David Fumanelli moved to the Blancpain Sprint Series and Emanuele Zonzini moved to the Italian GT Championship. They were replaced by three rookies; Victor Carbone, Roman de Beer and Denis Nagulin.

Status Grand Prix saw two of their 2013 drivers move to different teams — Jimmy Eriksson to Koiranen and Adderly Fong to Jenzer — whilst Josh Webster switched to Porsche Carrera Cup Great Britain. Nick Yelloly moved to the team from Carlin, and was joined by a rookie, Alfonso Celis Jr., and Richie Stanaway, who had last driven in GP3 in 2011.

==== Mid-season changes ====
Hilmer Motorsport made two changes to their lineup before the second round at the Red Bull Ring. Riccardo Agostini replaced Beitske Visser, whilst Nikolay Martsenko replaced his compatriot Ivan Taranov Martsenko was then replaced by Sebastian Balthasar in Silverstone. Martsenko returned for his home race in Sochi, but did not compete in Yas Marina.

Denis Nagulin was not present for the second round at the Red Bull Ring. He was replaced at Trident by Mitchell Gilbert in Silverstone.

Christopher Höher replaced Adderly Fong at Jenzer Motorsport for the round at the Hungaroring, as Fong had a race in the Audi R8 LMS Cup that weekend. Kevin Ceccon replaced Höher from the next round at the Spa.

Trident replaced their whole line-up for the round at Spa-Francorchamps. Instead of Victor Carbone, Roman de Beer and Mitchell Gilbert, the team fielded Konstantin Tereshchenko, John Bryant-Meisner and Luca Ghiotto. They altered the lineup further in Monza; Ghiotto replaced Tereshchenko in the #23 car, while Gilbert returned to his seat in the #25.

Marussia Manor Racing pulled out of the Sochi round due to financial troubles. Patrick Kujala signed with Trident, replacing Bryant-Meisner, for Sochi; in Yas Marina he instead replaced Gilbert, while fellow Marussia driver Ryan Cullen took his place in the #24 car. Dean Stoneman signed with Koiranen GP, replacing Carmen Jordá.

Kang Ling made his GP3 Series début at Abu Dhabi with Trident, replacing Ghiotto.

== Calendar ==
After the final race of the 2013 GP3 season, series organisers announced that the 2014 championship would include an event in Russia, supporting the 2014 Russian Grand Prix. On 6 December 2013, the full 2014 calendar was revealed with nine events, including races in Austria for the first time.

Round		Circuit/Location	Country	Date	Supporting
1	R1	Circuit de Barcelona-Catalunya, Barcelona	Spain	10 May	Spanish Grand Prix
1	R2	Circuit de Barcelona-Catalunya, Barcelona	Spain	11 May	Spanish Grand Prix
2	R1	Red Bull Ring, Spielberg	Austria	21 June	Austrian Grand Prix
2	R2	Red Bull Ring, Spielberg	Austria	22 June	Austrian Grand Prix
3	R1	Silverstone Circuit, Silverstone	United Kingdom	5 July	British Grand Prix
3	R2	Silverstone Circuit, Silverstone	United Kingdom	6 July	British Grand Prix
4	R1	Hockenheimring, Hockenheim	Germany	19 July	German Grand Prix
4	R2	Hockenheimring, Hockenheim	Germany	20 July	German Grand Prix
5	R1	Hungaroring, Budapest	Hungary	26 July	Hungarian Grand Prix
5	R2	Hungaroring, Budapest	Hungary	27 July	Hungarian Grand Prix
6	R1	Circuit de Spa-Francorchamps, Francorchamps	Belgium	23 August	Belgian Grand Prix
6	R2	Circuit de Spa-Francorchamps, Francorchamps	Belgium	24 August	Belgian Grand Prix
7	R1	Monza Circuit, Monza	Italy	6 September	Italian Grand Prix
7	R2	Monza Circuit, Monza	Italy	7 September	Italian Grand Prix
8	R1	Sochi Autodrom, Sochi	Russia	11 October	Russian Grand Prix
8	R2	Sochi Autodrom, Sochi	Russia	12 October	Russian Grand Prix
9	R1	Yas Marina Circuit, Abu Dhabi	United Arab Emirates	22 November	Abu Dhabi Grand Prix
9	R2	Yas Marina Circuit, Abu Dhabi	United Arab Emirates	23 November	Abu Dhabi Grand Prix

=== Calendar changes ===
- The stand-alone round at the Circuit Ricardo Tormo, introduced in 2013, was discontinued for 2014.
- The GP3 Series visited two circuits — the Red Bull Ring in Austria and the Sochi Autodrom in Russia — for the first time in 2014.

== Results ==
Round		Circuit	Pole position	Fastest lap	Winning driver	Winning team	Report
1	R1	(Spain) Circuit de Barcelona-Catalunya	(United Kingdom) Alex Lynn	(United Kingdom) Alex Lynn	(United Kingdom) Alex Lynn	(United Kingdom) Carlin	Report
1	R2	(Spain) Circuit de Barcelona-Catalunya		(Switzerland) Patric Niederhauser	(United Kingdom) Dean Stoneman	(United Kingdom) Marussia Manor Racing	Report
2	R1	(Austria) Red Bull Ring	(United Kingdom) Alex Lynn	(United Kingdom) Alex Lynn	(United Kingdom) Alex Lynn	(United Kingdom) Carlin	Report
2	R2	(Austria) Red Bull Ring		(United Kingdom) Emil Bernstorff	(United Kingdom) Emil Bernstorff	(United Kingdom) Carlin	Report
3	R1	(United Kingdom) Silverstone Circuit	(Sweden) Jimmy Eriksson	(United Kingdom) Alex Lynn	(Sweden) Jimmy Eriksson	(Finland) Koiranen GP	Report
3	R2	(United Kingdom) Silverstone Circuit		(South Africa) Roman de Beer (Note: Roman de Beer set the fastest lap, but did not finish in the top 10, so was ineligible to be the point-scorer for the fastest lap. Richie Stanaway was the point-scorer instead for setting the fastest lap of those finishing in the top 10.)	(New Zealand) Richie Stanaway	(Canada) Status Grand Prix	Report
4	R1	(Germany) Hockenheimring	(Germany) Marvin Kirchhöfer	(Germany) Marvin Kirchhöfer	(Germany) Marvin Kirchhöfer	(France) ART Grand Prix	Report
4	R2	(Germany) Hockenheimring		(United Kingdom) Jann Mardenborough	(United Kingdom) Jann Mardenborough	(United Kingdom) Arden International	Report
5	R1	(Hungary) Hungaroring	(New Zealand) Richie Stanaway	(United Kingdom) Jann Mardenborough	(New Zealand) Richie Stanaway	(Canada) Status Grand Prix	Report
5	R2	(Hungary) Hungaroring		(Australia) Mitchell Gilbert (Note: Mitchell Gilbert set the fastest lap, but did not finish in the top 10, so was ineligible to be the point-scorer for the fastest lap. Patric Niederhauser was the point-scorer instead for setting the fastest lap of those finishing in the top 10.)	(Switzerland) Patric Niederhauser	(United Kingdom) Arden International	Report
6	R1	(Belgium) Circuit de Spa-Francorchamps	(Italy) Luca Ghiotto	(Switzerland) Mathéo Tuscher (Note: Mathéo Tuscher set the fastest lap, but did not finish in the top 10, so was ineligible to be the point-scorer for the fastest lap. Dean Stoneman was the point-scorer instead for setting the fastest lap of those finishing in the top 10.)	(United Kingdom) Dean Stoneman	(United Kingdom) Marussia Manor Racing	Report
6	R2	(Belgium) Circuit de Spa-Francorchamps		(Switzerland) Alex Fontana	(United Kingdom) Alex Lynn	(United Kingdom) Carlin	Report
7	R1	(Italy) Monza Circuit	(Sweden) Jimmy Eriksson	(United Kingdom) Dino Zamparelli	(Sweden) Jimmy Eriksson	(Finland) Koiranen GP	Report
7	R2	(Italy) Monza Circuit		(Germany) Marvin Kirchhöfer	(United Kingdom) Dean Stoneman	(United Kingdom) Marussia Manor Racing	Report
8	R1	(Russia) Sochi Autodrom	(United Kingdom) Dean Stoneman	(United Kingdom) Dean Stoneman	(United Kingdom) Dean Stoneman	(Finland) Koiranen GP	Report
8	R2	(Russia) Sochi Autodrom		(Sweden) Jimmy Eriksson (Note: Jimmy Eriksson set the fastest lap, but did not finish in the top 10, so was ineligible to be the point-scorer for the fastest lap. Marvin Kirchhöfer was the point-scorer instead for setting the fastest lap of those finishing in the top 10.)	(Switzerland) Patric Niederhauser	(United Kingdom) Arden International	Report
9	R1	(United Arab Emirates) Yas Marina Circuit	(Germany) Marvin Kirchhöfer	(Germany) Marvin Kirchhöfer	(United Kingdom) Dean Stoneman	(Finland) Koiranen GP	Report
9	R2	(United Arab Emirates) Yas Marina Circuit		(Switzerland) Alex Fontana (Note: Alex Fontana set the fastest lap, but did not finish in the top 10, so was ineligible to be the point-scorer for the fastest lap. Dino Zamparelli was the point-scorer instead for setting the fastest lap of those finishing in the top 10.)	(United Kingdom) Nick Yelloly (Note: Patric Niederhauser won the race, but was later disqualified for a technical violation.)	(Canada) Status Grand Prix	Report

== Championship standings ==
Scoring system

Points were awarded to the top 10 classified finishers in the race 1, and to the top 8 classified finishers in the race 2. The pole-sitter in the race 1 also received four points, and two points were given to the driver who set the fastest lap inside the top ten in both the race 1 and race 2. No extra points were awarded to the pole-sitter in the race 2.

Race 1 points

Position	**1st**	**2nd**	**3rd**	**4th**	**5th**	**6th**	**7th**	**8th**	**9th**	**10th**	**Pole**	**FL**
Points	25	18	15	12	10	8	6	4	2	1	4	2

Race 2 points

Points were awarded to the top 8 classified finishers.

Position	**1st**	**2nd**	**3rd**	**4th**	**5th**	**6th**	**7th**	**8th**	**FL**
Points	15	12	10	8	6	4	2	1	2

=== Drivers' championship ===
Pos.	Driver	CAT (Spain)		RBR (Austria)		SIL (United Kingdom)		HOC (Germany)		HUN (Hungary)		SPA (Belgium)		MNZ (Italy)		SOC (Russia)		YMC (United Arab Emirates)		Points
Pos.	Driver	R1	R2	R1	R2	R1	R2	R1	R2	R1	R2	R1	R2	R1	R2	R1	R2	R1	R2	Points
1	(United Kingdom) Alex Lynn	**1**	18	**1**	20	2	6	2	3	4	4	8	1	6	2	7	5	5	2	207
2	(United Kingdom) Dean Stoneman	7	1	Ret	10	10	18†	5	4	9	8	1	9	5	1	**1**	2	1	Ret	163
3	(Germany) Marvin Kirchhöfer	5	5	5	DNS	3	4	**1**	Ret	11	9	DNS	17	3	3	2	3	**2**	11	161
4	(Sweden) Jimmy Eriksson	2	6	3	2	**1**	Ret	7	15	10	16	Ret	19	**1**	8	4	16	10	5	134
5	(United Kingdom) Emil Bernstorff	Ret	8	2	1	4	3	3	Ret	5	7	9	6	4	4	Ret	8	4	3	134
6	(United Kingdom) Nick Yelloly	9	7	7	5	5	2	4	5	2	11	3	5	10	5	9	6	8	1	127
7	(United Kingdom) Dino Zamparelli	6	3	15	8	8	7	6	2	8	2	2	7	2	9	18	13	3	4	126
8	(New Zealand) Richie Stanaway	3	4	4	3	7	1	13	7	**1**	6	7	2	9	Ret	12	Ret	12	7	125
9	(United Kingdom) Jann Mardenborough	14	14	11	Ret	9	15	8	1	7	3	4	4	11	Ret	6	4	13	Ret	77
10	(Switzerland) Patric Niederhauser	10	9	10	6	13	Ret	12	6	6	1	Ret	Ret	13	19	8	1	7	DSQ	62
11	(Switzerland) Alex Fontana	11	19	Ret	17	15	Ret	11	13	14	13	6	3	Ret	10	3	Ret	6	15	43
12	(Switzerland) Mathéo Tuscher	8	2	6	Ret	14	8	18	11	22	15	Ret	16	8	Ret	Ret	11	Ret	10	29
13	(Romania) Robert Vișoiu	13	11	Ret	14	20	13	10	9	3	5	Ret	20	19	14	Ret	10	15	8	23
14	(Finland) Patrick Kujala	4	Ret	9	7	12	Ret	25†	16	13	10	Ret	21	7	Ret	13	9	Ret	14	22
15	(Italy) Kevin Ceccon											11	11	12	6	5	Ret	9	6	20
16	(Italy) Riccardo Agostini			Ret	11	6	5	9	8	18	19	10	12	15	12	11	Ret	18	13	18
17	(Norway) Pål Varhaug	12	Ret	13	9	11	Ret	19	Ret	21	14	5	8	Ret	11	10	Ret	14	9	12
18	(South Africa) Roman de Beer	Ret	DSQ	12	4	17	16	21	17	15	12									8
19	(Macau) Luís Sá Silva	16	10	8	22	18	9	17	10	17	18	16	23†	14	7	17	15	Ret	17	6
20	(Italy) Luca Ghiotto											**18**	14	21	13					4
21	(Mexico) Alfonso Celis Jr.	18	Ret	Ret	19	16	10	Ret	23†	16	22	12	15	16	Ret	16	7	16	Ret	2
22	(Canada) Nelson Mason	17	Ret	14	16	25	12	16	14	19	20	15	10	Ret	18	15	DNS	17	18†	0
23	(Uruguay) Santiago Urrutia	21	13	16	12	Ret	14	22	18	12	Ret	13	18	Ret	15	14	12	11	12	0
24	(Hong Kong) Adderly Fong	Ret	12	Ret	15	21	11	15	12											0
25	(United Kingdom) Ryan Cullen	15	16	17	13	19	Ret	20	19	24	21	14	13	Ret	16			19	Ret	0
26	(Australia) Mitchell Gilbert					DNS	DNS	14	Ret	20	24			18	20	20	14			0
27	(Netherlands) Beitske Visser	19	15																	0
28	(China) Kang Ling																	20	16	0
29	(Spain) Carmen Jordá	Ret	Ret	20	21	24	17	Ret	22	25	25	17	Ret	20	21					0
30	(Sweden) John Bryant-Meisner											20†	22	17	17					0
31	(Brazil) Victor Carbone	Ret	17	18	18	23	Ret	23	20											0
32	(Germany) Sebastian Balthasar					22	Ret	24	21	Ret	17	19†	DNS	Ret	DNS					0
33	(Russia) Nikolay Martsenko			19	DNS											19	Ret			0
34	(Russia) Ivan Taranov	22†	20																	0
35	(Russia) Denis Nagulin	20	Ret																	0
36	(Austria) Christopher Höher									23	23									0
	(Russia) Konstantin Tereshchenko											DNS	DNS							0
Pos.	Driver	R1	R2	R1	R2	R1	R2	R1	R2	R1	R2	R1	R2	R1	R2	R1	R2	R1	R2	Points
Pos.	Driver	CAT (Spain)		RBR (Austria)		SIL (United Kingdom)		HOC (Germany)		HUN (Hungary)		SPA (Belgium)		MNZ (Italy)		SOC (Russia)		YMC (United Arab Emirates)		Points

Key
Colour	Result
Gold	Winner
Silver	2nd place
Bronze	3rd place
Green	Other points position
Blue	Other classified position
Blue	Not classified, finished (NC)
Purple	Not classified, retired (Ret)
Red	Did not qualify (DNQ)
Red	Did not pre-qualify (DNPQ)
Black	Disqualified (DSQ)
White	Did not start (DNS)
White	Race cancelled (C)
Blank	Did not practice (DNP)
Blank	Excluded (EX)
Blank	Did not arrive (DNA)
Blank	Withdrawn (WD)
Text formatting	Meaning
**Bold**	Pole position point(s)
Italics	Fastest lap point(s)

Notes:

- † — Drivers did not finish the race, but were classified as they completed over 90% of the race distance.

=== Teams' championship ===
Pos.	Team	No.	CAT (Spain)		RBR (Austria)		SIL (United Kingdom)		HOC (Germany)		HUN (Hungary)		SPA (Belgium)		MNZ (Italy)		SOC (Russia)		YMC (United Arab Emirates)		Points
Pos.	Team	No.	R1	R2	R1	R2	R1	R2	R1	R2	R1	R2	R1	R2	R1	R2	R1	R2	R1	R2	Points
1	(United Kingdom) Carlin	10	**1**	18	**1**	20	2	6	2	3	4	4	8	1	6	2	7	5	5	2	347
1	(United Kingdom) Carlin	11	Ret	8	2	1	4	3	3	Ret	5	7	9	6	4	4	Ret	8	4	3	347
1	(United Kingdom) Carlin	12	16	10	8	22	18	9	17	10	17	18	16	23†	14	7	17	15	Ret	17	347
2	(France) ART Grand Prix	1	11	19	Ret	17	15	Ret	11	13	14	13	6	3	Ret	10	3	Ret	6	15	330
2	(France) ART Grand Prix	2	5	5	5	DNS	3	4	**1**	Ret	11	9	DNS	17	3	3	2	3	**2**	11	330
2	(France) ART Grand Prix	3	6	3	15	8	8	7	6	2	8	2	2	7	2	9	18	13	3	4	330
3	(Canada) Status Grand Prix	26	9	7	7	5	5	2	4	5	2	11	3	5	10	5	9	6	8	1	254
3	(Canada) Status Grand Prix	27	3	4	4	3	7	1	13	7	**1**	6	7	2	9	Ret	12	Ret	12	7	254
3	(Canada) Status Grand Prix	28	18	Ret	Ret	19	16	10	Ret	23†	16	22	12	15	16	Ret	16	7	16	Ret	254
4	(Finland) Koiranen GP	7	Ret	Ret	20	21	24	17	Ret	22	25	25	17	Ret	20	21	**1**	2	1	Ret	202
4	(Finland) Koiranen GP	8	2	6	3	2	**1**	Ret	7	15	10	16	Ret	19	**1**	8	4	16	10	5	202
4	(Finland) Koiranen GP	9	21	13	16	12	Ret	14	22	18	12	Ret	13	18	Ret	15	14	12	11	12	202
5	(United Kingdom) Arden International	4	13	11	Ret	14	20	13	10	9	3	5	Ret	20	19	14	Ret	10	15	8	162
5	(United Kingdom) Arden International	5	10	9	10	6	13	Ret	12	6	6	1	Ret	Ret	13	19	8	1	7	DSQ	162
5	(United Kingdom) Arden International	6	14	14	11	Ret	9	15	8	1	7	3	4	4	11	Ret	6	4	13	Ret	162
6	(United Kingdom) Marussia Manor Racing	14	4	Ret	9	7	12	Ret	24†	16	13	10	Ret	21	7	Ret					117
6	(United Kingdom) Marussia Manor Racing	15	15	16	17	13	19	Ret	20	19	24	21	14	13	Ret	16					117
6	(United Kingdom) Marussia Manor Racing	16	7	1	Ret	10	10	18†	5	4	9	8	1	9	5	1					117
7	(Switzerland) Jenzer Motorsport	20	12	Ret	13	9	11	Ret	19	Ret	21	14	5	8	Ret	11	10	Ret	14	9	61
7	(Switzerland) Jenzer Motorsport	21	8	2	6	Ret	14	8	18	11	22	15	Ret	16	8	Ret	Ret	11	Ret	10	61
7	(Switzerland) Jenzer Motorsport	22	Ret	12	Ret	15	21	11	15	12	23	23	11	11	12	6	5	Ret	9	6	61
8	(Germany) Hilmer Motorsport	17	22†	20	19	DNS	22	Ret	24	21	25	25	19†	DNS	Ret	DNS	19	Ret			18
8	(Germany) Hilmer Motorsport	18	17	Ret	14	16	25	12	16	14	23	23	15	10	Ret	18	15	DNS	17	18†	18
8	(Germany) Hilmer Motorsport	19	19	15	Ret	11	6	5	9	8	19	18	10	12	15	12	11	Ret	18	13	18
9	(Italy) Trident	23	Ret	17	18	18	23	Ret	23	20			DNS	DNS	21	13			20	16	12
9	(Italy) Trident	24	Ret	DSQ	12	4	17	16	21	17	15	12	20†	22	17	17	13	9	19	15	12
9	(Italy) Trident	25	20	Ret			DNS	DNS	14	Ret	20	24	**18**	14	18	20	20	14	Ret	Ret	12
Pos.	Team	No.	R1	R2	R1	R2	R1	R2	R1	R2	R1	R2	R1	R2	R1	R2	R1	R2	R1	R2	Points
Pos.	Team	No.	CAT (Spain)		RBR (Austria)		SIL (United Kingdom)		HOC (Germany)		HUN (Hungary)		SPA (Belgium)		MNZ (Italy)		SOC (Russia)		YMC (United Arab Emirates)		Points

Key
Colour	Result
Gold	Winner
Silver	2nd place
Bronze	3rd place
Green	Other points position
Blue	Other classified position
Blue	Not classified, finished (NC)
Purple	Not classified, retired (Ret)
Red	Did not qualify (DNQ)
Red	Did not pre-qualify (DNPQ)
Black	Disqualified (DSQ)
White	Did not start (DNS)
White	Race cancelled (C)
Blank	Did not practice (DNP)
Blank	Excluded (EX)
Blank	Did not arrive (DNA)
Blank	Withdrawn (WD)
Text formatting	Meaning
**Bold**	Pole position point(s)
Italics	Fastest lap point(s)

Notes:

- † — Drivers did not finish the race, but were classified as they completed over 90% of the race distance.
