= Dino Zamparelli =

British racing driver (born 1992)

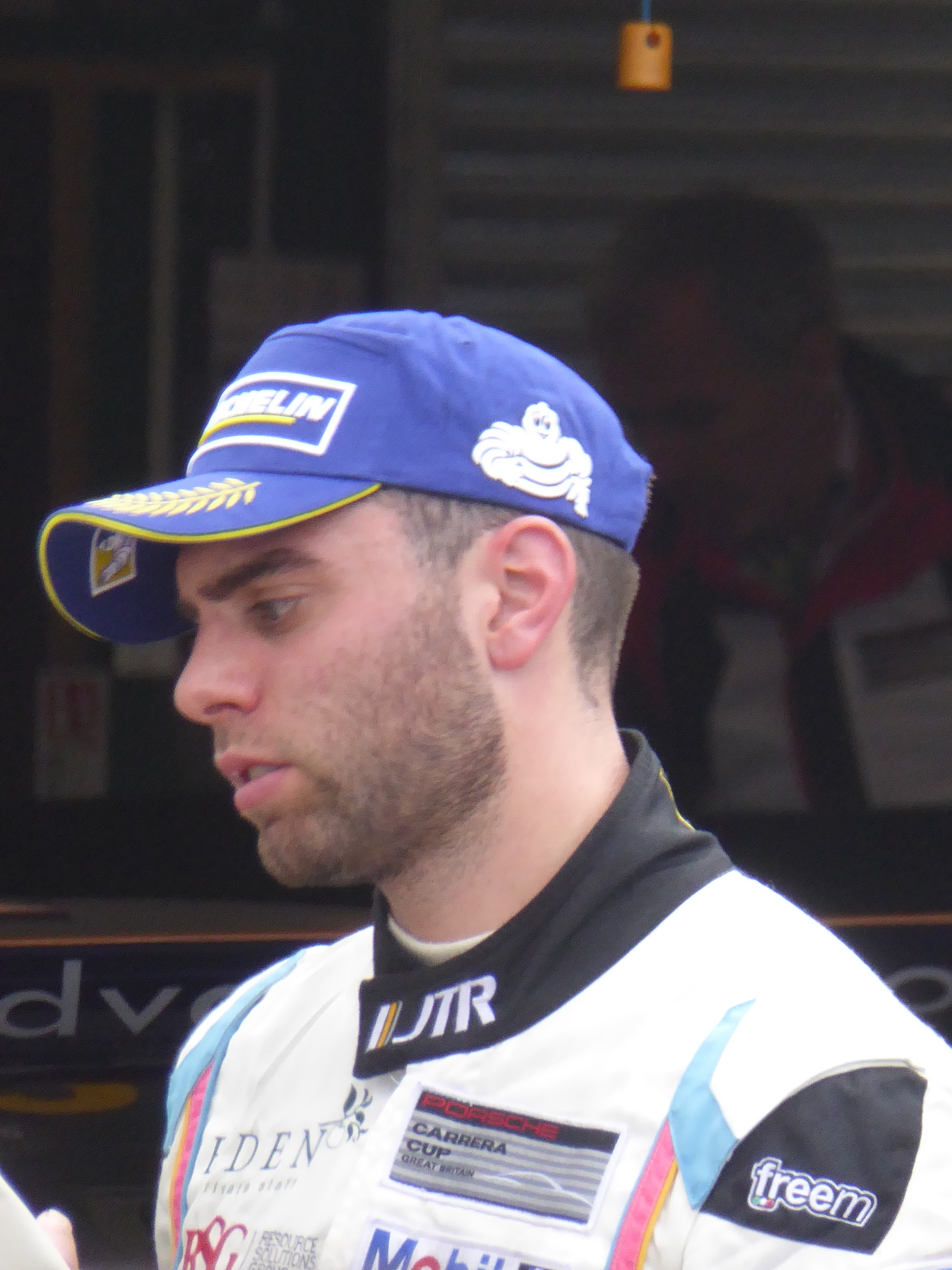
- Zamparelli in 2017
- Nationality: British
- Born: Armando Roberto Zamparelli; 5 October 1992 (age 34) Bristol, England

GP3 Series career
- Debut season: 2013
- Current team: ART Grand Prix
- Car number: 3
- Former teams: Marussia Manor Racing
- Starts: 33
- Wins: 0
- Poles: 0
- Fastest laps: 2
- Best finish: 7th in 2014

Previous series
- 2012 2009–11 2007–08: FIA Formula Two Championship; Formula Renault BARC; Ginetta Junior Championship

Championship titles
- 2011 2008: Formula Renault BARC; Ginetta Junior Championship

Armando Roberto "Dino" Zamparelli (born 5 October 1992) is a British former racing driver, born to English parents and with Italian ancestry. His father Mike was a F1 Powerboat World Championship racer.

== Career ==
=== Early career ===
Zamparelli began karting at the age of seven, and spent seven years in the various classes around the United Kingdom and Europe.

In 2007, Zamparelli debuted in Ginetta Junior Championship with Muzz Racing, finishing in thirteenth position. He stayed in series for the next year, and amassed ten wins and another five podiums on his way to the championship title.

=== Formula Renault and Formula Three ===
Zamparelli's next step was Formula Renault BARC in 2009, where he finished in third place, scoring three wins. In 2010, due to a lack of funding, he competed only in two races of the BARC championship and two races of the Italian Formula Three Championship with Corbetta Competizioni. Zamparelli returned full-time to Formula Renault BARC in 2011, winning four races and the championship title. He was also a finalist in the 2011 McLaren Autosport BRDC Award.

=== FIA Formula Two Championship ===
In 2012, Zamparelli graduated to the FIA Formula Two Championship. Zamparelli was involved in an extraordinary incident during the race meet at Spa. In heavy rain and under safety car conditions, Zamparelli was driving along the Kemmel Straight when a car in front spun. Unable to see the spinning car, he was forced to take evasive action at the very last second. The video of the incident quickly went viral and was viewed over 600,000 times within the first two weeks after being uploaded to YouTube.

=== GP3 Series ===
Following the decision to discontinue the running of the Formula Two Championship following the 2012 season, Zamparelli signed for the Marussia Manor Racing F1 Team Young Driver Programme and entered into the 2013 GP3 Series season. He finished the season in 18th place after an indifferent debut year. Zamparelli finished in the points in half of the season's 16 races but was excluded from race 2 in Italy after causing an accident in race 1 of the same event that had a significant impact on the championship standings.

Prior to the 2014 season, Zamparelli joined ART Grand Prix. He finished seventh in the standings with six podiums.

=== Porsche Carrera Cup Great Britain ===
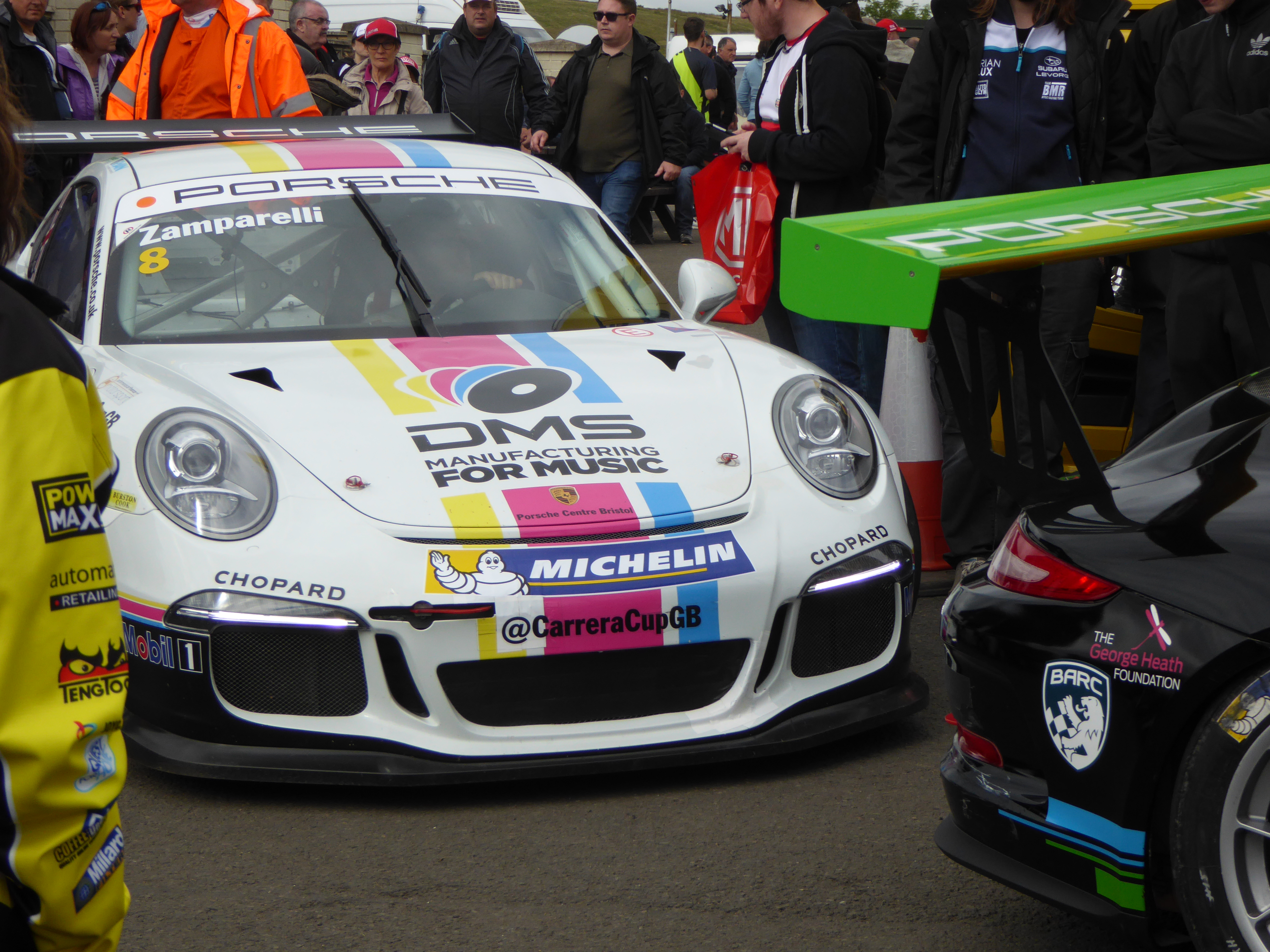
Zamparelli, at the Knockhill round of the 2017 Porsche Carrera Cup Great Britain.

In January 2015, Zamparelli announced that he was switching from single seaters to sports cars, joining Parr Motorsport to race in the 2015 Porsche Carrera Cup Great Britain.

=== British GT Championship ===
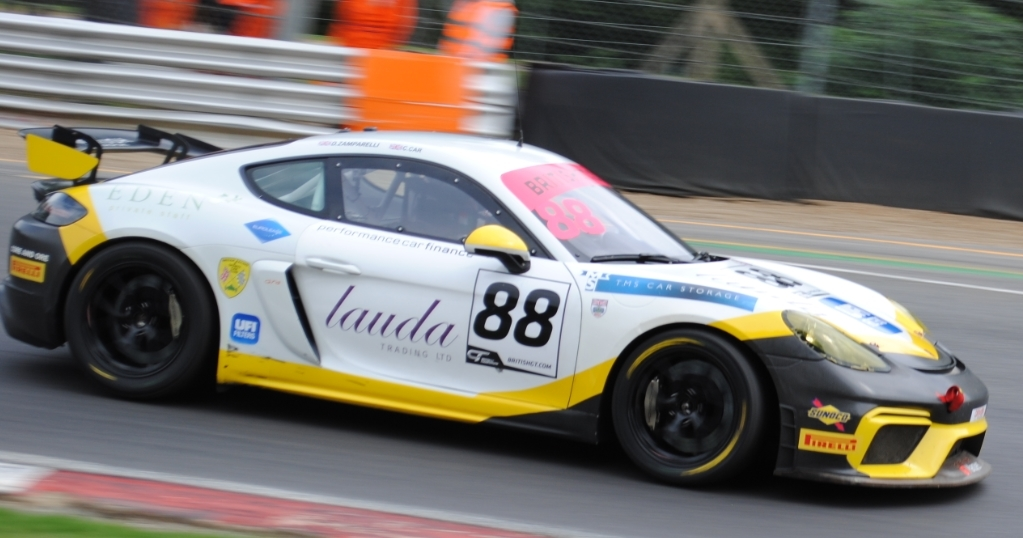
Zamparelli's GT Marques Porsche Cayman at Brands Hatch

Zamparelli entered the 2019 championship at Snetterton with Chris Car in a Porsche Cayman GT4. The car was uncompetitive in every round and failed to score any points.

== Racing record ==
=== Career summary ===
Season	Series	Team	Races	Wins	Poles	F/Laps	Podiums	Points	Position
2007	Ginetta Junior Championship	Muzz Racing	9	0	0	0	0	115	13th
2007	Ginetta Junior Winter Series	Muzz Racing	3	0	0	0	0	0	NC
2008	Ginetta Junior Championship	Muzz Racing	24	10	8	9	15	611	**1st**
2008	Formula Renault 2.0 Portugal Winter Series	Fortec Motorsport	4	0	0	0	0	2	25th
2009	Formula Renault BARC	Reon Motorsport	13	3	3	1	9	286	**3rd**
2009	Formula Renault UK Winter Cup	Fortec Motorsport	4	0	0	0	0	70	6th
2010	Italian Formula 3 Championship	Corbetta Competizioni	2	0	0	0	0	0	41st
2010	Formula Renault BARC	Antel Motorsport	2	0	0	0	0	40	18th
2011	Formula Renault BARC	Antel Motorsport	11	4	6	5	8	295	**1st**
2012	FIA Formula Two Championship	Motorsport Vision	16	0	0	0	2	106.5	8th
2013	GP3 Series	Marussia Manor Racing	15	0	0	0	0	12	18th
2014	GP3 Series	ART Grand Prix	18	0	0	2	6	126	7th
2014	German Formula 3 Championship	ADM Motorsport	3	0	0	0	0	0	NC†
2015	Porsche Carrera Cup GB	Parr Motorsport	12	0	0	0	0	180	6th
2015	Porsche Carrera Cup GB	GT Marques	4	2	0	2	4	180	6th
2016	Porsche Carrera Cup GB	GT Marques	16	3	2	5	11	257	**2nd**
2016	Porsche Supercup	MOMO-Megatron Team Partrax	1	0	0	0	0	0	NC†
2017	Porsche Carrera Cup GB	JTR	15	3	1	2	12	228	**2nd**
2018	Porsche Carrera Cup GB	Redline Racing	16	4	2	4	10	115	**2nd**
2018	Porsche Supercup	BWT Lechner Racing	1	0	0	0	0	0	NC†
2019	British GT Championship - GT4	GT Marques	7	0	0	0	0	0	NC
2020	Porsche Sprint Challenge GB	Redline Racing	2	0	1	1	1	0	NC†
2021	GT Cup Open Europe	J. Morcillo/E2P Racing	4	0	1	0	0	20	17th
2021	GT Cup Open Europe - Pro-Am	J. Morcillo/E2P Racing	4	0	1	0	1	15	9th
2021	International GT Open	J. Morcillo/E2P Racing	1	0	0	0	0	0	NC†

^{†} As Zamparelli was a guest driver, he was ineligible to score points.

=== Complete FIA Formula Two Championship results ===
(key)

Year	1	2	3	4	5	6	7	8	9	10	11	12	13	14	15	16	Pos	Points
2012	SIL; 1; 9	SIL; 2; 6	ALG; 1; 8	ALG; 2; 5	NÜR; 1; 13	NÜR; 2; 7	SPA; 1; 7	SPA; 2; 10	BRH; 1 Ret	BRH; 2; 3	LEC; 1; 4	LEC; 2; 6	HUN; 1; 6	HUN; 2; 3	MNZ; 1; 7	MNZ; 2; 7	8th	106.5

=== Complete GP3 Series results ===
(key) (Races in italics indicate fastest lap)

Year	Entrant	1	2	3	4	5	6	7	8	9	10	11	12	13	14	15	16	17	18	Pos	Points
2013	Marussia Manor Racing	CAT; FEA; Ret	CAT; SPR; 17	VAL; FEA; 9	VAL; SPR; 10	SIL; FEA; 10	SIL; SPR; Ret	NÜR; FEA; 9	NÜR; SPR; 7	HUN; FEA; 13	HUN; SPR; 21	SPA; FEA; 10	SPA; SPR; 7	MNZ; FEA; Ret	MNZ; SPR; EX	YMC; FEA; 9	YMC; SPR; 8			18th	12
2014	ART Grand Prix	CAT; FEA; 6	CAT; SPR; 3	RBR; FEA; 15	RBR; SPR; 8	SIL; FEA; 8	SIL; SPR; 7	HOC; FEA; 6	HOC; SPR; 2	HUN; FEA; 8	HUN; SPR; 2	SPA; FEA; 2	SPA; SPR; 7	MNZ; FEA; 2	MNZ; SPR; 9	SOC; FEA; 18	SOC; SPR; 13	YMC; FEA; 3	YMC; SPR; 4	7th	126

=== Complete Britcar results ===
(key) (Races in bold indicate pole position in class – 1 point awarded just in first race) (Races in italics indicate fastest lap in class – 1 point awarded all races)

Year	Team	Car	Class	1	2	3	4	5	6	7	8	9	10	11	12	13	14	15	DC	CP	Points
2017	DMS & FF Corse	Ferrari 458 Challenge	E2	**SIL**; **1**; 1	SIL; 2; 4	SNE; 1 Ret	SNE; 2 Ret	SIL; 1	SIL; 2	BRH; 1	BRH; 2	DON; 1	DON; 2	OUL; 1	OUL; 2	SIL	BRH; 1	BRH; 2	16th	3rd	76

=== Complete British GT Championship results ===
(key) (Races in bold indicate pole position) (Races in italics indicate fastest lap)

Year	Team	Car	Class	1	2	3	4	5	6	7	8	9	DC	Points
2019	GT Marques	Porsche 718 Cayman GT4 Clubsport	GT4	OUL; 1	OUL; 2	SNE; 1; 28	SNE; 2; 32	SIL; 1; 32	DON; 1; 32	SPA; 1; 32	BRH; 1 Ret	DON; 1; 29	NC	0

Sporting positions
Preceded by Nigel Moore	Ginetta Junior Championship; Winner; 2008	Succeeded by Sarah Moore
Preceded by Alice Powell	Formula Renault BARC; Champion; 2011	Succeeded by Scott Malvern
