= 2008 Ginetta Junior Championship =

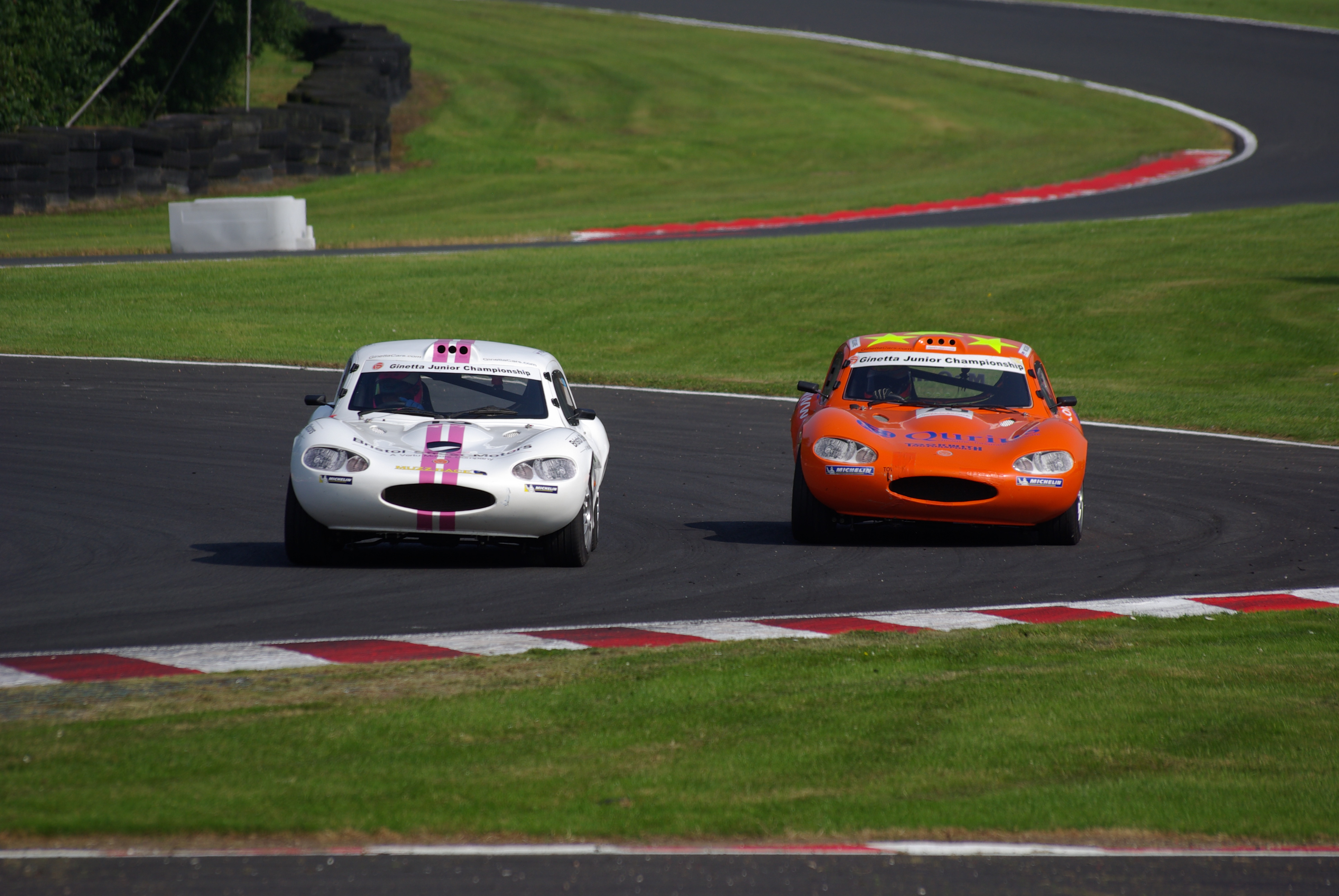
Two Ginetta at Oulton Park.

The 2008 Ginetta Junior Championship season in association with Motorsport News was the fourth Ginetta Junior Championship season, the championship designed for racing drivers between the ages of fourteen and seventeen years of age. The season began at Brands Hatch on 29 March 2008 and finished at the same venue on 21 September 2008, after twenty-four rounds. The championship was won by Muzz Racing's 15-year-old driver Dino Zamparelli, who did enough to hold off the challenge from 16-year-old Thomas Carnaby.

== Teams and drivers ==
- All teams and drivers were British-registered. All drivers drove a Ginetta Jnr. car, which is cosmetically based on the Ginetta G20 car, but with different engine and mechanics.

Team	No	Driver
Hepworth International	5	Ryan Hepworth
TollBar Racing	6	Thomas Carnaby
TollBar Racing	28	George Richardson
TollBar Racing	55	Josh Hill
TollBar Racing	91	Fergus Walkinshaw
Tockwith Motorsport	7	Nick Ponting
Tockwith Motorsport	15	Alice Powell
Tockwith Motorsport	23	Daniel Lloyd
Tockwith Motorsport	26	Sarah Moore
Tockwith Motorsport	51	Alex Austin
Tockwith Motorsport	70	Max McGuire
Tockwith Motorsport	72	Cassey Watson
Muzz Racing	8	Dino Zamparelli
Muzz Racing	15	Alice Powell
Muzz Racing	33	Jake Rattenbury
Private Entry	20	Tom Howard
Optimum Motorsport	24	Simon Austin
TJ Motorsport	25	Aaron Williamson
TJ Motorsport	60	Jake Batty
Private Entry	27	Mia Morgan
Private Entry	29	Ashley Craig
Private Entry	44	Mikey Crabtree
Private Entry	52	Jay Southern
Dominant Motorsport	66	Dominic Pettit
Private Entry	75	Oliver Llewellyn
Private Entry	86	Jake Farndon

== Calendar ==
- All rounds (United Kingdom) , unless stated.

Round	Circuit	Date	Pole position	Fastest lap	Winning driver	Winning team
1	Brands Hatch	March 29	George Richardson	Dino Zamparelli	Dino Zamparelli	Muzz Racing
2	Brands Hatch	March 30	George Richardson	Thomas Carnaby	George Richardson	TollBar Racing
3	Cadwell Park	April 5	Dino Zamparelli	Dino Zamparelli	Dino Zamparelli	Muzz Racing
4	Cadwell Park	April 6	Dino Zamparelli	George Richardson	Dino Zamparelli	Muzz Racing
5	Rockingham	April 12	Thomas Carnaby	Thomas Carnaby	Thomas Carnaby	TollBar Racing
6	Rockingham	April 13	Thomas Carnaby	Thomas Carnaby	Thomas Carnaby	TollBar Racing
7	Donington Park	May 3	Josh Hill	Dino Zamparelli	Dino Zamparelli	Muzz Racing
8	Donington Park	May 4	Josh Hill	Dino Zamparelli	Dino Zamparelli	Muzz Racing
9	Thruxton	May 17	Dino Zamparelli*	Thomas Carnaby	Dino Zamparelli	Muzz Racing
10	Thruxton	May 18	Dino Zamparelli	Dominic Pettit	Dino Zamparelli	Muzz Racing
11	Croft	May 31	Dominic Pettit	George Richardson	Daniel Lloyd	Tockwith Motorsport
12	Croft	June 1	Daniel Lloyd	Josh Hill	Jake Farndon	private entry
13	Snetterton	July 12	Josh Hill	Dino Zamparelli	Thomas Carnaby	TollBar Racing
14	Snetterton	July 13	Thomas Carnaby	Dino Zamparelli	George Richardson	TollBar Racing
15	Oulton Park	July 26	Thomas Carnaby	Fergus Walkinshaw	Thomas Carnaby	TollBar Racing
16	Oulton Park	July 27	Thomas Carnaby	Thomas Carnaby	Thomas Carnaby	TollBar Racing
17	Knockhill	August 16	Dino Zamparelli	Dino Zamparelli	Dino Zamparelli	Muzz Racing
18	Knockhill	August 17	Dino Zamparelli	Daniel Lloyd	Daniel Lloyd	Tockwith Motorsport
19	Silverstone	August 30	Dino Zamparelli	Fergus Walkinshaw	Dino Zamparelli	Muzz Racing
20	Silverstone	August 31	Dino Zamparelli	Dino Zamparelli	Dino Zamparelli	Muzz Racing
21	Mallory Park	September 6	Thomas Carnaby	Dominic Pettit	Thomas Carnaby	TollBar Racing
22	Mallory Park	September 7	Thomas Carnaby	Thomas Carnaby	Thomas Carnaby	TollBar Racing
23	Brands Hatch	September 20	Dominic Pettit	Dino Zamparelli	Dominic Pettit	Dominant Motorsport
24	Brands Hatch	September 21	Dominic Pettit	Alex Austin	Dominic Pettit	Dominant Motorsport

* - Josh Hill had originally qualified on pole but was sent to the back due to changing chassis after qualifying. No pole point was awarded.

== Championship Standings ==
- The best 20 scores by each driver, count towards the championship.

Position	1	2	3	4	5	6	7	8	9	10	11	12	13	14	15	16	17	18	19	20	PP/FL
Points	35	30	26	22	20	18	16	14	12	11	10	9	8	7	6	5	4	3	2	1	1

Pos	Driver	BHI		CAD		ROC		DON		THR		CRO		SNE		OUL		KNO		SIL		MAL		BHI		T. Pts	Drop	Pts
1	Dino Zamparelli	1	12	1	1	2	2	1	1	1	1	2	Ret	5	4	Ret	4	1	Ret	1	1	5	2	7	3	621	10	611
2	Thomas Carnaby	4	7	2	2	1	1	19	Ret	3	2	3	6	1	2	1	1	3	3	Ret	4	1	1	4	2	614	19	595
3	Josh Hill	8	13	3	4	7	4	3	2	Ret	12	6	10	3	3	3	2	2	4	Ret	2	2	4	6	4	488	17	471
4	Dominic Pettit	2	Ret	DNS	10	5	5	12	4	2	3	5	2	Ret	Ret	2	10	4	Ret	DSQ	6	4	7	1	1	412		412
5	Daniel Lloyd	11	5	10	6	4	6	6	3	6	4	1	DSQ	4	5	6	9	Ret	1	Ret	10	6	5	2	6	424	21	403
6	George Richardson	3	1	16	12	14	DNS	2	Ret			4	5	2	1	Ret	3	Ret	7	12	5	7	6	5	9	360		360
7	Fergus Walkinshaw	5	10	6	5	15	9	Ret	7	12	5	13	3	8	6	8	5	5	Ret	3	3	3	Ret	8	8	360	6	354
8	Jake Farndon	15	8	8	3	3	3	7	Ret	4	7	7	1	13	10	4	7	9	6	DSQ	11	11	3	10	11	371	24	347
9	Alice Powell	9	3	5	Ret	8	8	13	5	9	10	8	Ret	6	11	15	13	7	2	2	15	10	Ret	3	5	332	6	326
10	Alex Austin	19	19	DNS	11	13	11	5	8	5	11	Ret	Ret	11	14	9	15	6	5	5	13	12	8	9	7	249	2	247
11	Jake Batty	20	9	11	14	19	15	16	10	13	16	11	12	Ret	7	7	12	8	8	7	9	Ret	Ret	11	10	204	1	203
12	Ashley Craig	13	14	7	Ret	12	14	4	Ret	16	17	10	4	7	15	Ret	8	Ret	DNS	8	8	19	13	Ret	12	194		194
13	Aaron Williamson	16	Ret	9	8	6	Ret	14	Ret	8	6	DNS	DNS	9	Ret	5	DSQ			4	7	8	14	15	17	189		189
14	Max McGuire	17	15	12	13	11	12	9	13	14	15	Ret	11	14	13	11	11	11	9	9	16	16	15	12	13	191	14	177
15	Cassey Watson	7	6	4	9	10	10	10	6	11	9	9	7													169		169
16	Simon Austin	12	11	17	7			8	15	7	8			10	8	12	6			Ret	14	13	17			160		160
17	Sarah Moore	14	20	14	15	18	16	15	14	Ret	13	15	9	12	9	10	17	Ret	Ret	6	18	9	10	Ret	15	154		154
18	Jake Rattenbury	18	18	13	17	16	13	17	11	15	14	12	Ret	15	12	13	14			10	17	18	9	Ret	14	134		134
19	Oliver Llewellyn	Ret	17	15	16	17	17	Ret	12	10	18	14	8			14	16			DSQ	Ret	17	12			92		92
20	Nick Ponting	10	4			9	7	11	9	17	Ret															87		87
21	Tom Howard													16	17	16	Ret	10	10	11	12	14	Ret	13	16	75		75
22	Jay Southern	6	2																							48		48
23	Mia Morgan	21	16	18	18	20	19	18	16	18	19			Ret	16											32		32
24	Ryan Hepworth					Ret	18					16	13									20	16	Ret	18	25		25
25	Mikey Crabtree																					15	11	14	Ret	23		23
Pos	Driver	BHI		CAD		ROC		DON		THR		CRO		SNE		OUL		KNO		SIL		MAL		BHI		T. Pts	Drop	Pts

Colour	Result
Gold	Winner
Silver	Second place
Bronze	Third place
Green	Points classification
Blue	Non-points classification
Blue	Non-classified finish (NC)
Purple	Retired, not classified (Ret)
Red	Did not qualify (DNQ)
Red	Did not pre-qualify (DNPQ)
Black	Disqualified (DSQ)
White	Did not start (DNS)
White	Withdrew (WD)
White	Race cancelled (C)
Blank	Did not practice (DNP)
Blank	Did not arrive (DNA)
Blank	Excluded (EX)
