= Kourosh Khani =

Iranian racing driver (born 1989)

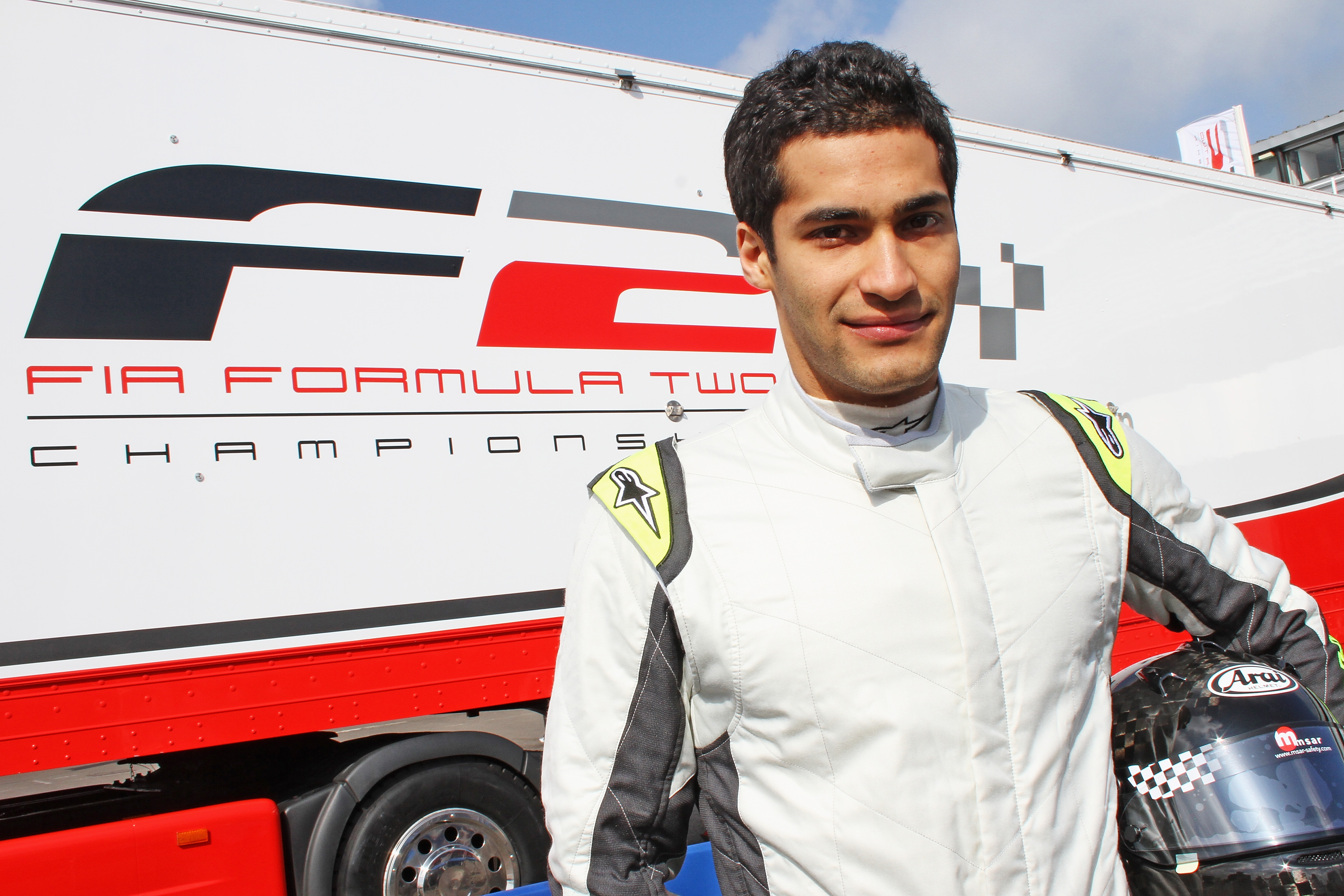
- Nationality: Iranian
- Born: 3 July 1989 (age 37) Mashhad, Iran

Previous series
- 2012 2008–11 2007: FIA Formula Two Championship; Formula Renault BARC; Formula Ford Great Britain

Kourosh Khani (born 3 July 1989) is an Iranian racing driver. He is one of the premier racers from Iran.

== Biography ==
Khani dominated numerous karting championships in his home country before moving to the United Kingdom in 2006. In 2007, he entered the British Formula Ford Championship.

In 2012, Khani graduated to the FIA Formula Two Championship, competing in four rounds and scoring two points.

Khani competed at the end-of-season testing for the GP3 Series in 2014, driving for Hilmer Motorsport. However, he did not secure a full-time seat for 2015.

== Racing record ==
Season	Series	Team	Races	Wins	Poles	F/Laps	Podiums	Points	Position
2007	British Formula Ford Championship	GW Racing	7	0	0	0	0	8	25th
2008	Formula Renault 2.0 UK BARC	Welch Motorsport	11	0	0	0	0	7	16th
2008	Formula Renault 2.0 UK BARC Winter Series	Welch Motorsport	4	1	4	1	1	17	3rd
2009	Protyre Formula Renault BARC Championship	Welch Motorsport	13	0	0	0	0	164	8th
2009	Ginetta G50 Cup	Welch Motorsport	3	0	0	0	0	32	24th
2010	Protyre Formula Renault BARC Championship	Welch Motorsport	12	0	0	0	0	142	8th
2011	Protyre Formula Renault BARC Championship	Scorpio Motorsport	12	1	0	0	3	200	4th
2011	MRF Formula 1600 Delhi Championship	MRF Racing	2	0	0	0	1	27	3rd
2012	MotorSport Vision Formula 3 Cup	Lanan Racing	4	4	2	4	4	105	10th
2012	FIA Formula Two Championship	MotorSport Vision	8	0	0	0	0	2	20th
2013	Formula Premium Championship	Beta Epsilon	3	1	2	0	3	?	?
