= 2010 Formula Renault BARC season =

Motor racing competition

2010 Formula Renault BARC

Seasons
- ← 2009 2011 →

The Protyre 2010 Formula Renault BARC season was the 16th Formula Renault BARC Championship. The season began at Brands Hatch on 18 April and ended on 17 October at Thruxton, after twelve rounds held in England. Making its debut in the series was the previous-specification Formula Renault UK car which ran alongside the existing BARC car in a one-class Championship.

Hillspeed driver Alice Powell became the first female driver to win any Formula Renault championship after overhauling a 16-point deficit to rival Mitchell Hale of Fortec Motorsport at the season's final meeting at Thruxton. Powell won two races at Silverstone and Thruxton with five second places compared to Hale's three victories at Brands Hatch, Silverstone and Snetterton. Third place was also resolved at the final round of the season between Powell's teammate James Theodore and Josh Webster, who started the season as Hale's teammate but took part in the final meeting for Welch Motorsport. Theodore, a race-winner at Croft, Rockingham and Thruxton, got the better of Webster by three points, after he finished ahead of Webster in the final race of the season. Other race wins were taken by Joseph Reilly at Snetterton and Rockingham, Luke Wright at Croft, and Euan Hankey in a one-off appearance at Brands Hatch.

== Teams and drivers ==
2010 Entry List
Team	No.	Driver name	Rounds
Welch Motorsport	3	(United Kingdom) Jack Piper	All
Welch Motorsport	4	(United Kingdom) Josh Webster	6
Welch Motorsport	7	(Iran) Kourosh Khani	All
Fortec Motorsport	4	(United Kingdom) Josh Webster	1–5
Fortec Motorsport	23	(United Kingdom) Joseph Reilly	All
Fortec Motorsport	41	(United Kingdom) Mitchell Hale	All
Privateer	5	(United Kingdom) James Birch	All
Uniq Racing with Triple Eight	8	(Malaysia) Sazlan Sirajudin	All
Anglo Motorsport	11	(United Kingdom) Brett Parris	5
Anglo Motorsport	11	(Denmark) Kasper Krogh	1
Antel Motorsport	11	(Denmark) Kasper Krogh	2–4
Antel Motorsport	11	(United Kingdom) Dino Zamparelli	6
Antel Motorsport	12	(Russia) Roman Beregech	4–6
Antel Motorsport	16	(United Kingdom) Euan Hankey	1
Antel Motorsport	17	(United Kingdom) Matthew Draper	All
Hillspeed	15	(United Kingdom) Alice Powell	All
Hillspeed	44	(Germany) Josephine Ferrada	2–6
Hillspeed	99	(United Kingdom) James Theodore	All
RPD Motorsport	18	(United Kingdom) Steven Durrant	1, 3–6
SWB Motorsport	27	(United Kingdom) Luke Wright	All
SWB Motorsport	28	(United Kingdom) Andrew Jarman	All
Mtech	32	(Italy) Tommaso Menchini	5
Mtech	33	(United Kingdom) Jake Rattenbury	All
Mtech	36	(United Kingdom) James Thorp	6

== Calendar ==
The series formed part of the BARC club racing meetings. All races held in England.

Round		Circuit	Date	Pole position	Fastest lap	Winning driver	Winning team
1	R1	Brands Hatch (Indy), Kent	18 April	(United Kingdom) James Theodore	(United Kingdom) Mitchell Hale	(United Kingdom) Mitchell Hale	Fortec Motorsport
1	R2	Brands Hatch (Indy), Kent	18 April	(United Kingdom) Mitchell Hale	(United Kingdom) Mitchell Hale	(United Kingdom) Euan Hankey	Antel Motorsport
2	R3	Silverstone (National), Northamptonshire	9 May	(United Kingdom) Mitchell Hale	(United Kingdom) Mitchell Hale	(United Kingdom) Mitchell Hale	Fortec Motorsport
2	R4	Silverstone (National), Northamptonshire	9 May	(United Kingdom) Alice Powell	(United Kingdom) Mitchell Hale	(United Kingdom) Alice Powell	Hillspeed
3	R5	Croft Circuit, North Yorkshire	4 July	(United Kingdom) James Theodore	(United Kingdom) James Theodore	(United Kingdom) James Theodore	Hillspeed
3	R6	Croft Circuit, North Yorkshire	4 July	(United Kingdom) James Theodore	(United Kingdom) Luke Wright	(United Kingdom) Luke Wright	SWB Motorsport
4	R7	Snetterton Motor Racing Circuit, Norfolk	1 August	(United Kingdom) James Theodore	(United Kingdom) Mitchell Hale	(United Kingdom) Joseph Reilly	Fortec Motorsport
4	R8	Snetterton Motor Racing Circuit, Norfolk	1 August	(United Kingdom) Mitchell Hale	(United Kingdom) Mitchell Hale	(United Kingdom) Mitchell Hale	Fortec Motorsport
5	R9	Rockingham Motor Speedway, Northamptonshire	12 September	(United Kingdom) James Theodore	(United Kingdom) Joseph Reilly	(United Kingdom) James Theodore	Hillspeed
5	R10	Rockingham Motor Speedway, Northamptonshire	12 September	(United Kingdom) Joseph Reilly	(United Kingdom) Josh Webster	(United Kingdom) Joseph Reilly	Fortec Motorsport
6	R11	Thruxton Circuit, Hampshire	17 October	(United Kingdom) Mitchell Hale	(United Kingdom) James Theodore	(United Kingdom) James Theodore	Hillspeed
6	R12	Thruxton Circuit, Hampshire	17 October	(United Kingdom) Alice Powell	(United Kingdom) James Theodore	(United Kingdom) Alice Powell	Hillspeed

== Standings ==
Pos	Driver	BHI		SIL		CRO		SNE		ROC		THR		Total	Drop	Points
1	(United Kingdom) Alice Powell	5	5	2	1	2	2	2	4	4	7	2	1	304	16	288
2	(United Kingdom) Mitchell Hale	1	3	1	2	6	6	3	1	6	5	8	5	294	14	280
3	(United Kingdom) James Theodore	4	Ret	9	3	5	1	Ret	5	1	3	1	2	254		254
4	(United Kingdom) Josh Webster	Ret	4	3	4	4	3	4	7	5	2	4	3	251		251
5	(United Kingdom) Joseph Reilly	3	2	Ret	DNS	3	11	1	3	2	1	11	8	231		231
6	(United Kingdom) Luke Wright	2	Ret	5	7	1	5	Ret	2	3	4	3	10	229		229
7	(United Kingdom) James Birch (P)	10(*)	8(*)	7(*)	6(*)	11(*)	14(*)	6(*)	8(*)	9(*)	10(*)	5(*)	6(*)	189	9	180
8	(Iran) Kourosh Khani	6	12	4	5	7	Ret	7	Ret	8	13	14	9	142		142
9	(United Kingdom) Andrew Jarman	7	7	12	8	9	7	9	Ret	11	11	13	13	131		131
10	(United Kingdom) Matthew Draper	8	Ret	6	Ret	10	12	5	12	15	16	10	15	109		109
11	(Denmark) Kasper Krogh	13	6	8	Ret	13	4	8	6					102		102
12	(United Kingdom) Jack Piper	Ret	10	10	9	12	9	14	14	13	12	12	Ret	95		95
13	(United Kingdom) Steven Durrant	12	Ret			8	8	10	10	Ret	9	Ret	11	81		81
14	(Germany) Josephine Ferrada			11	11	15	10	12	11	16	14	15	14	81		81
15	(United Kingdom) Jake Rattenbury	11	9	Ret	DNS	Ret	Ret	11	9	10	Ret	Ret	12	64		64
16	(Malaysia) Sazlan Sirajudin	Ret	11	Ret	10	14	13	Ret	Ret	12	15	16	16	61		61
17	(United Kingdom) Euan Hankey	9	1											44		44
18	(United Kingdom) Dino Zamparelli											6	4	40		40
19	(Russia) Roman Beregech							13	13	14	Ret	9	Ret	35		35
20	(United Kingdom) Brett Parris									7	6			34		34
21	(United Kingdom) James Thorp											7	7	32		32
22	(Italy) Tommaso Menchini									Ret	8			14		14
Pos	Driver	BHI		SIL		CRO		SNE		ROC		THR		Total	Drop	Points

Colour	Result
Gold	Winner
Silver	Second place
Bronze	Third place
Green	Points classification
Blue	Non-points classification
Blue	Non-classified finish (NC)
Purple	Retired, not classified (Ret)
Red	Did not qualify (DNQ)
Red	Did not pre-qualify (DNPQ)
Black	Disqualified (DSQ)
White	Did not start (DNS)
White	Withdrew (WD)
White	Race cancelled (C)
Blank	Did not practice (DNP)
Blank	Did not arrive (DNA)
Blank	Excluded (EX)

- (Bold) = Pole Position
- (Italics) = Fastest Lap
- (p) = Privateer Club drivers
