= 2011 Formula Renault BARC season =

Motor racing competition

2011 Formula Renault BARC

Seasons
- ← 2010 2012 →

The Protyre 2011 Formula Renault BARC season was the 17th Formula Renault BARC Championship. The BARC is the British Automobile Racing Club (BARC) that is one of the biggest organising clubs for auto racing in the United Kingdom. The season began at Donington Park on 23 April and ended on 16 October at Silverstone, after twelve rounds held in England.

== Teams and drivers ==
2011 Entry List
Team	No.	Driver name	Rounds
Hillspeed	1	(United Kingdom) Howard Fuller	All
Hillspeed	9	(India) Zaamin Jaffer	All
Hillspeed	33	(United Kingdom) Sean Walkinshaw	All
Fortec Motorsport	2	(United Kingdom) Archie Hamilton	All
Fortec Motorsport	4	(United Kingdom) Kieran Vernon	1–4
Fortec Motorsport	4	(United Kingdom) James Theodore	6
Fortec Motorsport	5	(United Kingdom) Josh Webster	All
Fortec Motorsport	25	(Spain) Víctor Jiménez	All
KG Motorsport	6	(United Kingdom) Anton Spires	6
Antel Motorsport	7	(United Kingdom) Callum Bowyer	All
Antel Motorsport	8	(United Kingdom) Dino Zamparelli	All
MGR Motorsport	14	(United Kingdom) Matt Mason	All
MGR Motorsport	23	(United Kingdom) Russell Danzey	1–3
MGR Motorsport	23	(United Kingdom) Luke Wright	4
MGR Motorsport	28	(United Kingdom) Andrew Jarman	6
MGR Motorsport	43	(United Kingdom) David Wagner	All
JWA Racing	17	(United Kingdom) Tom Walker	All
RPD Motorsport	18	(United Kingdom) Steven Durrant	All
SWB Motorsport	26	(United Kingdom) Macaulay Walsh	1–3
SWB Motorsport	27	(United Kingdom) Jack Dex	All
SWB Motorsport	28	(United Kingdom) Andrew Jarman	1–4
SWB Motorsport	29	(South Africa) Raoul Owens	All
Scorpio Motorsport	35	(United Kingdom) Hector Hurst	All
Scorpio Motorsport	77	(Iran) Kourosh Khani	All
MTECH Lite	36	(United Kingdom) James Thorp	All
MTECH Lite	99	(United Kingdom) James Theodore	3
National College for Motorsport	41	(United Kingdom) Max Robinson	6
Daytona Motorsport	55	(Russia) Ivan Taranov	All

== Calendar ==
The series will form part of the BARC club racing meetings. The final round at Silverstone will be part of the British Touring Car Championship meeting. On 3 March, a non-championship round was announced, to be held at Zandvoort, supporting the Masters of Formula 3 event and racing alongside the Formula Renault 2.0 Northern European Cup. Only Hillspeed took cars to the event. All rounds held in United Kingdom

Round		Circuit	Date	Pole position	Fastest lap	Winning driver	Winning team
1	R1	Donington Park (National)	24 April	(United Kingdom) Dino Zamparelli	(United Kingdom) Josh Webster	(United Kingdom) Josh Webster	Fortec Motorsport
1	R2	Donington Park (National)	24 April	(United Kingdom) James Thorp	(United Kingdom) Dino Zamparelli	(United Kingdom) James Thorp	MTECH Lite
2	R3	Brands Hatch (Indy)	15 May	(United Kingdom) Kieran Vernon	(United Kingdom) Kieran Vernon	(United Kingdom) Kieran Vernon	Fortec Motorsport
2	R4	Brands Hatch (Indy)	15 May	(United Kingdom) Dino Zamparelli	(Spain) Víctor Jiménez	(United Kingdom) Dino Zamparelli	Antel Motorsport
3	R5	Oulton Park (Island)	28 May	(United Kingdom) Dino Zamparelli	(United Kingdom) Josh Webster	(United Kingdom) Josh Webster	Fortec Motorsport
3	R6	Oulton Park (Island)	28 May	(United Kingdom) Dino Zamparelli	(United Kingdom) Dino Zamparelli	(Iran) Kourosh Khani	Scorpio Motorsport
4	R7	Croft Circuit	24 July	(United Kingdom) Dino Zamparelli	(United Kingdom) James Thorp	(United Kingdom) James Thorp	MTECH Lite
4	R8	Croft Circuit	24 July	(United Kingdom) Josh Webster	(United Kingdom) Josh Webster	(United Kingdom) Dino Zamparelli	Antel Motorsport
5	R9	Thruxton Circuit	3 September	(United Kingdom) Dino Zamparelli	(United Kingdom) Dino Zamparelli	(United Kingdom) Dino Zamparelli	Antel Motorsport
5	R10	Thruxton Circuit	3 September	(United Kingdom) Dino Zamparelli	(United Kingdom) Dino Zamparelli	(United Kingdom) Dino Zamparelli	Antel Motorsport
6	R11	Silverstone (National)	15 October	(United Kingdom) Josh Webster	(United Kingdom) Josh Webster	(United Kingdom) Josh Webster	Fortec Motorsport
6	R12	Silverstone (National)	16 October	(United Kingdom) Matt Mason	(United Kingdom) Dino Zamparelli	(United Kingdom) Matt Mason	MGR Motorsport

== Championship standings ==
Pos	Driver	DON		BRH		OUL		CRO		THR		SIL		Points
1	(United Kingdom) Dino Zamparelli	4	8	6	1	Ret	3	2	1	1	1	3	3	295
2	(United Kingdom) Josh Webster	1	Ret	2	5	1	2	Ret	2	3	3	1	2	286
3	(United Kingdom) James Thorp	2	1	10	2	6	DSQ	1	6	2	7	7	5	238
4	(Iran) Kourosh Khani	15	Ret	4	3	4	1	3	5	9	5	DSQ	7	200
5	(United Kingdom) Archie Hamilton	6	3	3	6	3	8	Ret	3	Ret	6	2	Ret	196
6	(United Kingdom) Matt Mason	8	9	9	7	Ret	6	8	15	4	2	9	1	186
7	(United Kingdom) Kieran Vernon	10	2	1	Ret	2	4	17	4					149
8	(United Kingdom) Steven Durrant	3	4	8	4	11	Ret	Ret	Ret	5	4	21	9	147
9	(United Kingdom) Howard Fuller	Ret	5	5	8	Ret	10	6	12	8	9	8	10	143
10	(United Kingdom) Callum Bowyer	19	Ret	11	14	5	Ret	5	8	7	Ret	4	6	129
11	(United Kingdom) David Wagner	12	7	12	11	Ret	12	10	10	6	Ret	16	4	120
12	(India) Zaamin Jaffer	7	14	7	9	7	9	13	14	Ret	10	15	13	119
13	(United Kingdom) Hector Hurst	5	13	Ret	12	Ret	14	9	9	Ret	8	5	8	116
14	(Russia) Ivan Taranov	11	11	15	16	10	Ret	Ret	16	10	12	11	14	84
15	(United Kingdom) Jack Dex	14	16	16	17	12	13	11	11	Ret	11	10	17	83
16	(Spain) Víctor Jiménez	13	6	Ret	15	Ret	DNS	7	13	Ret	DNS	20	15	65
17	(United Kingdom) Tom Walker	Ret	15	17	18	13	16	16	18	12	13	14	19	60
18	(United Kingdom) Russell Danzey	9	Ret	13	10	9	11							53
19	(United Kingdom) James Theodore					Ret	5					6	11	48
20	(United Kingdom) Andrew Jarman	18	10	Ret	DNS	8	15	12	Ret			17	21	47
21	(South Africa) Raoul Owens	Ret	12	14	19	Ret	Ret	14	17	11	Ret	19	18	44
22	(United Kingdom) Sean Walkinshaw	17	Ret	Ret	20	14	Ret	15	19	13	14	18	20	39
23	(United Kingdom) Luke Wright							4	7					38
24	(United Kingdom) Macaulay Walsh	16	Ret	Ret	13	Ret	7							29
25	(United Kingdom) Anton Spires											13	12	17
26	(United Kingdom) Max Robinson											12	16	14
Pos	Driver	DON		BRH		OUL		CRO		THR		SIL		Points

Colour	Result
Gold	Winner
Silver	Second place
Bronze	Third place
Green	Points classification
Blue	Non-points classification
Blue	Non-classified finish (NC)
Purple	Retired, not classified (Ret)
Red	Did not qualify (DNQ)
Red	Did not pre-qualify (DNPQ)
Black	Disqualified (DSQ)
White	Did not start (DNS)
White	Withdrew (WD)
White	Race cancelled (C)
Blank	Did not practice (DNP)
Blank	Did not arrive (DNA)
Blank	Excluded (EX)
