= Alice Powell =

British racing driver

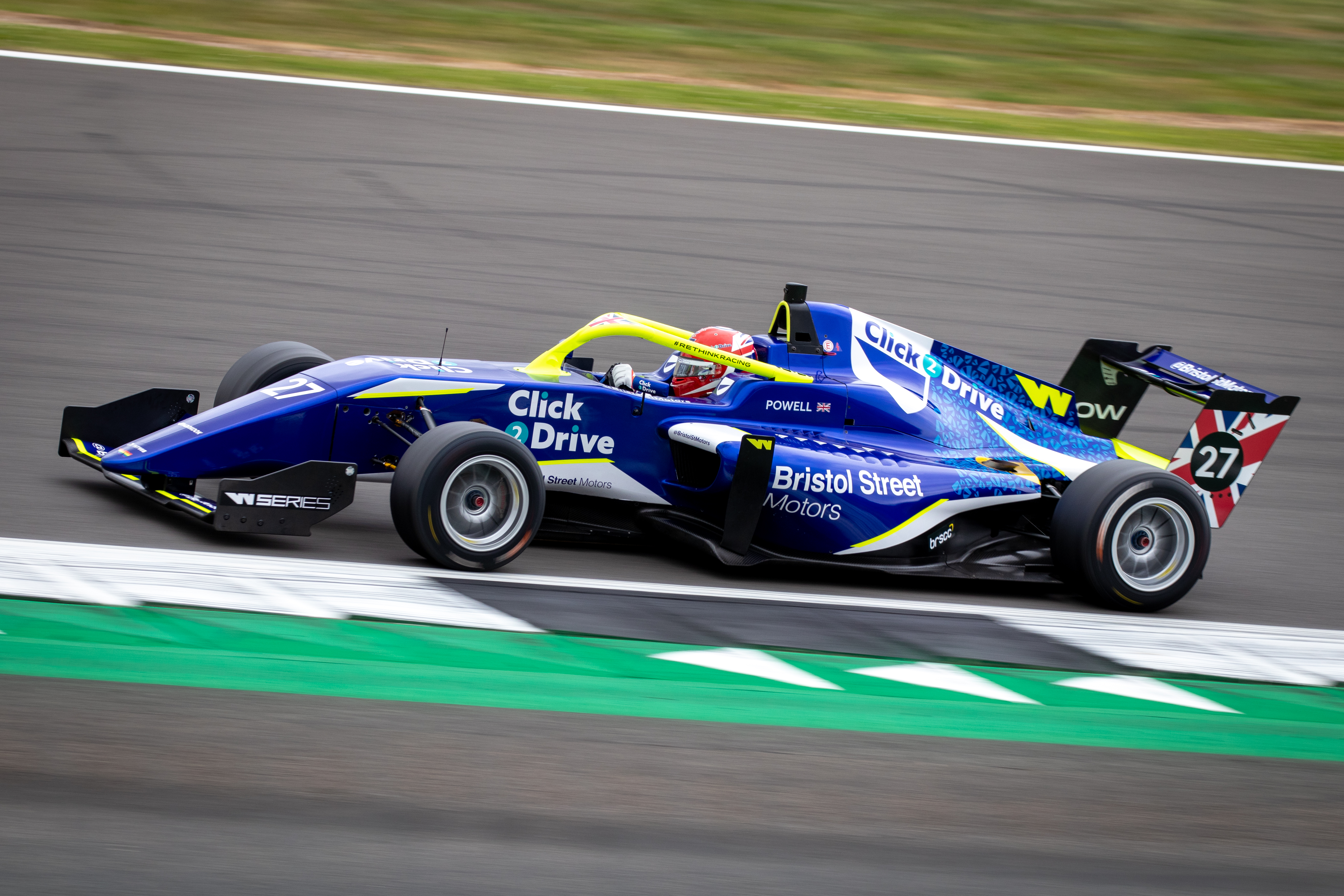
- Powell competing in the 2022 W Series Silverstone round.
- Nationality: (United Kingdom) British
- Born: Alice Elizabeth Fraser Powell; 26 January 1993 (age 33) Oxford, England

W Series career
- Debut season: 2019
- Current team: Click2Drive
- Categorisation: FIA Silver
- Car number: 27
- Former teams: Racing X
- Starts: 20
- Wins: 5
- Podiums: 11
- Poles: 2
- Fastest laps: 4
- Best finish: 2nd in 2021

Previous series
- 2018–20 2015–16 2014 2013 2012 2009, 2011 2010 2010 2009 2008: Jaguar I-Pace eTrophy; MRF Challenge; Asian Formula Renault Series; F3 Cup; GP3 Series; Formula Renault UK; Ginetta G50 Cup; Formula Renault BARC; Formula Palmer Audi; Ginetta Junior Championship

Championship titles
- 2010 2014: Formula Renault BARC; Asian Formula Renault Series

Awards
- 2010 2011: BWRDC GoldStars Award; BWRDC GoldStars Elite

Alice Elizabeth Fraser Powell (born 26 January 1993) is a British racing driver and commentator. In 2010, she became the first woman to win a Formula Renault championship and in 2012 became the first woman to score points in the GP3 Series. In 2014, she returned to racing in Formula Renault and added to her championship victories by taking first place in the International Class of the 2014 Asian Formula Renault Series. In 2019, Powell was one of the 18 women selected to compete in the inaugural W Series championship. During the course of the season's six races, Powell took four podium finishes, including a win at the series finale race at Brands Hatch, and finished third in the championship standings. Following an enforced hiatus caused by the global COVID-19 pandemic, Powell returned to the W Series for the 2021 championship and won the opening race of the year, at the Red Bull Ring.

== Racing career ==
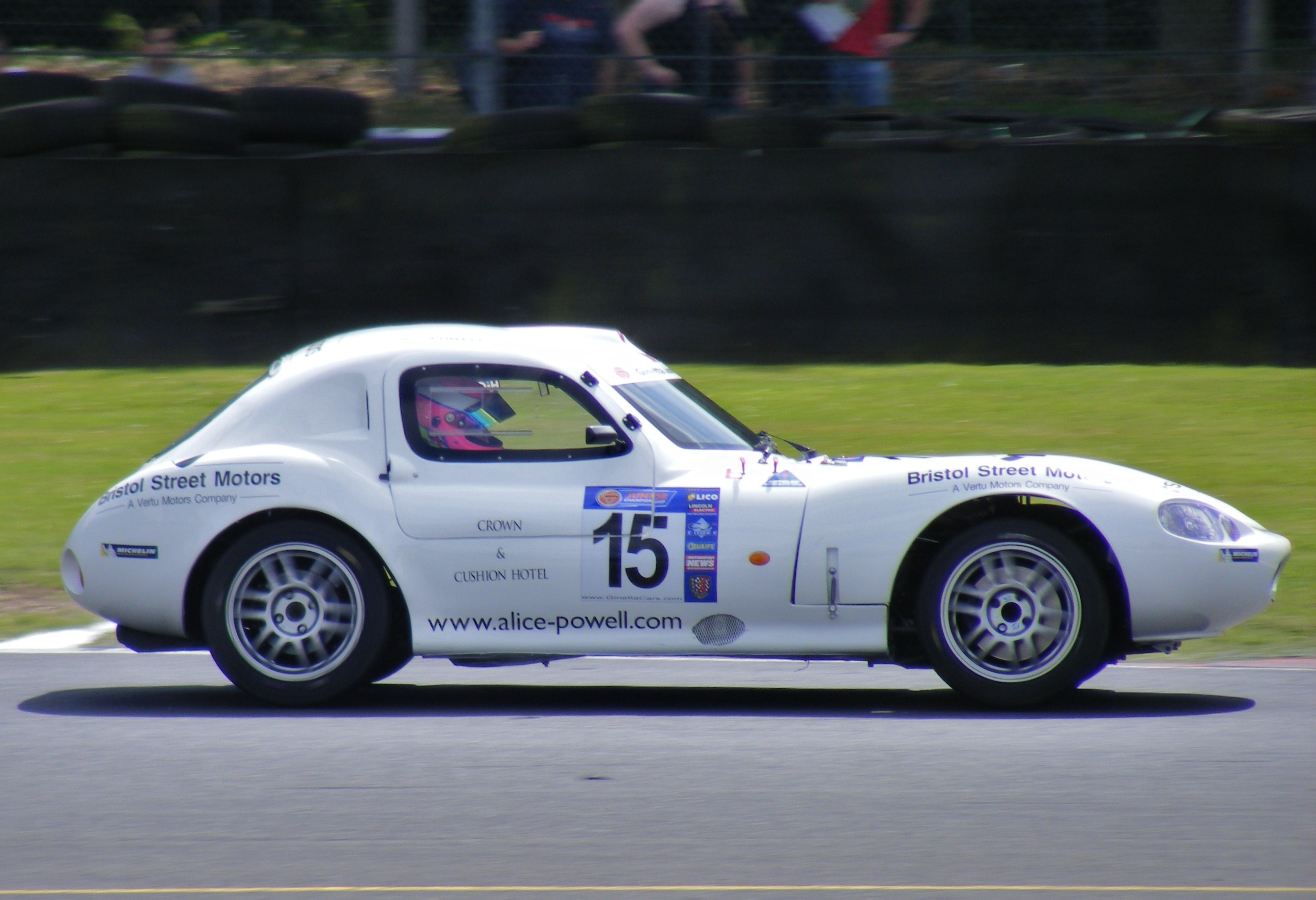
Powell competing in the 2008 Ginetta Junior Championship.

=== Formula Renault ===
Powell was born in Oxford, England. She learned to drive at the age of six, and started her career in karting two years later. In 2009, at 16, she drove in the Michelin Formula Renault UK Championship, becoming the youngest female driver in a Formula Renault race. Powell finished the year as runner up for the Young Star Award at the Women of the Future Awards. She was also awarded the British Women Racing Drivers Club GoldStars 'Elite' category Award. Powell set a record in the fourth round of the 2010 Formula Renault BARC Championship by becoming the first woman to win a Formula Renault race in the UK, and later in the year became the first woman to win a Formula Renault championship. During the 2010 season, Powell's race engineer was Sarah Shaw. Powell and Manor returned to the Formula Renault UK championship in 2011, but failed to win a race and finished the season in ninth place in the championship.

Powell returned to Formula Renault three years later, driving for FRD Motorsport in the International Class of the 2014 Asian Formula Renault Series. During the 11 race season Powell took five class victories, four of which were also outright race wins, and won the class.

=== GP3 Series ===
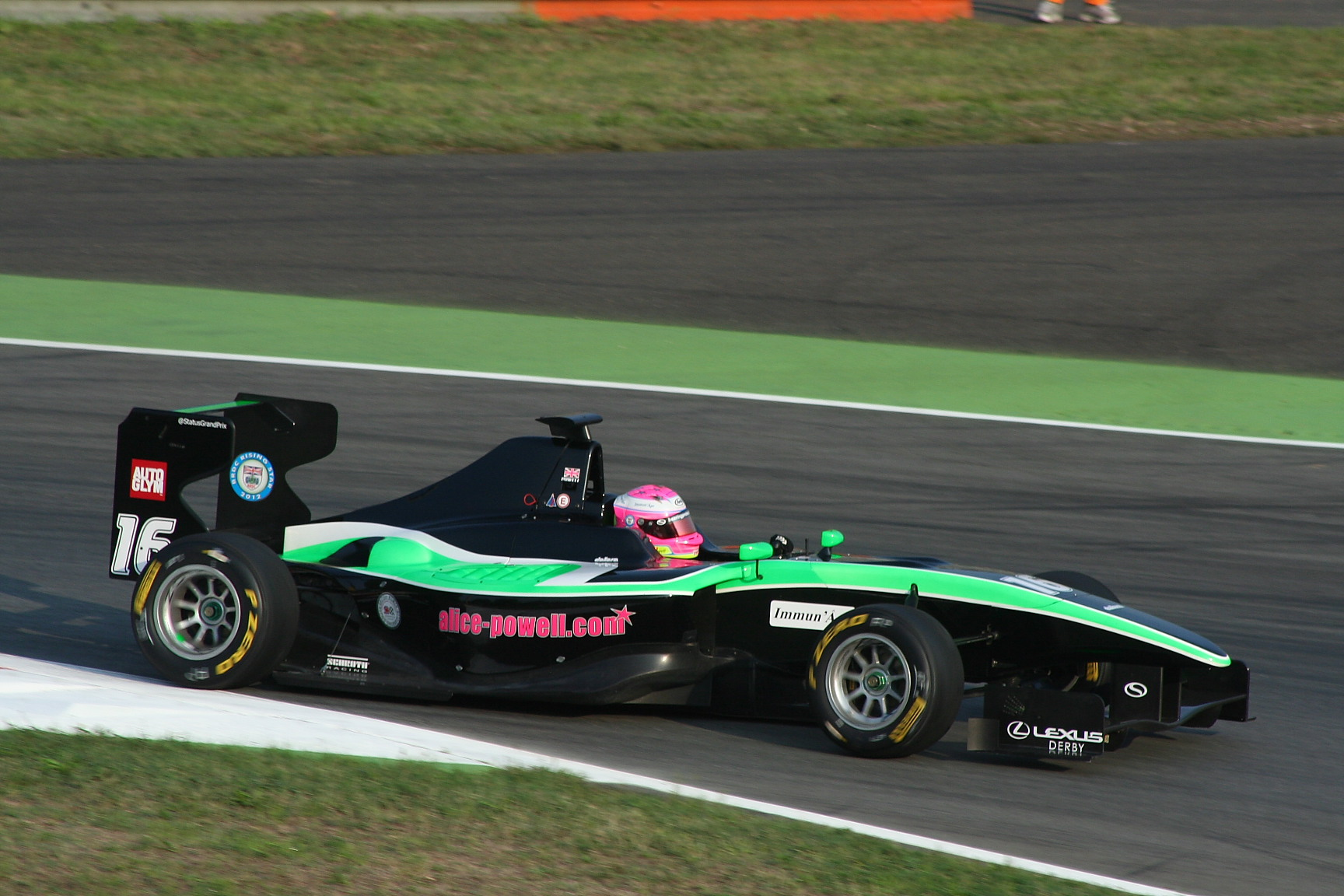
Powell contesting the 2012 Monza GP3 Series round.

On 15 June 2012, after only two test days in the GP3 car, it was announced that Powell would drive for the Status Grand Prix team in the 2012 GP3 Series. On 9 September that year she finished eighth in the Monza round sprint race, and in doing so became the first female points scorer since the inception of the GP3 Series in 2010.

She returned to the series in 2013 for a one-off appearance at Yas Marina, replacing Melville McKee. She finished 19th in the feature race and 20th in the sprint, leaving her 31st in the overall standings.

=== Formula 3 ===
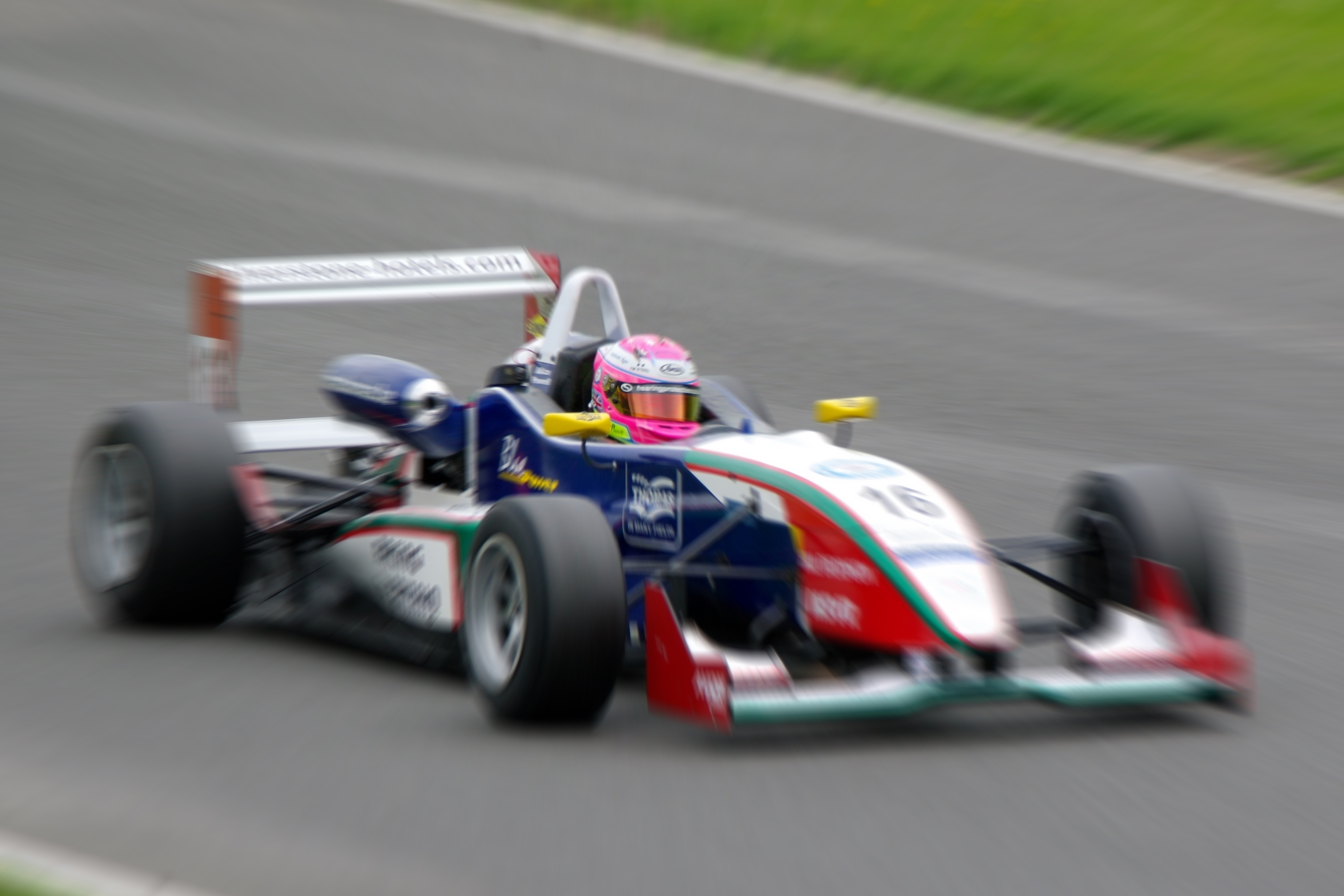
Powell competing in the MSV F3 Cup at Brands Hatch in 2013.

Powell joined F3 Cup for 2013 having been unable to continue in the GP3 Series. She took part in the opening round of the 2013 British Formula 3 season at Silverstone, driving the Mark Bailey Racing run Dallara F306, which she also raced in the MotorSport Vision Formula Three Cup.

In the 2013 MotorSport Vision Formula Three Cup, Powell finished second in the championship behind Alex Craven, having won five times during the season including three of the first four races.

=== Formula 1 ===
On 12 November 2014, Powell was reported as trying to raise funds to drive a Caterham Formula One car, in a free practice session at the end of season Abu Dhabi Grand Prix. The Caterham team had gone into administration in October 2014 and had not attended the previous two Grands Prix. It was later reported that Powell had abandoned the idea as it was unlikely that the appropriate superlicence could be obtained.

Powell has served as the Talent Identification & Development Mentor for the Alpine Academy since 2022.

=== Formula E ===
In 2020, it was announced that Powell, now an ambassador for Dare to Be Different, would take part in the Rookie Test after the 2020 Marrakesh ePrix, driving for Envision Virgin Racing, partnering Nick Cassidy. She has served as the Simulator and Development Driver for the team since the 2021–2022 season. Powell also took part in the May 2024 Berlin rookie test and November 2024 Jarama pre-season women's test for Envision Racing. She returned with the team for the October 2025 pre-season women's test in Valencia, finishing both the morning and afternoon sessions in fourth.

=== MRF Challenge ===
Powell signed up to compete in the first race of the 2015–16 edition of the MRF Challenge. At the first round in Abu Dhabi, Powell scored four top ten finishes out of four races, with a best finish of eighth in the final race, after being out of single seaters for nearly a year.

=== W Series ===
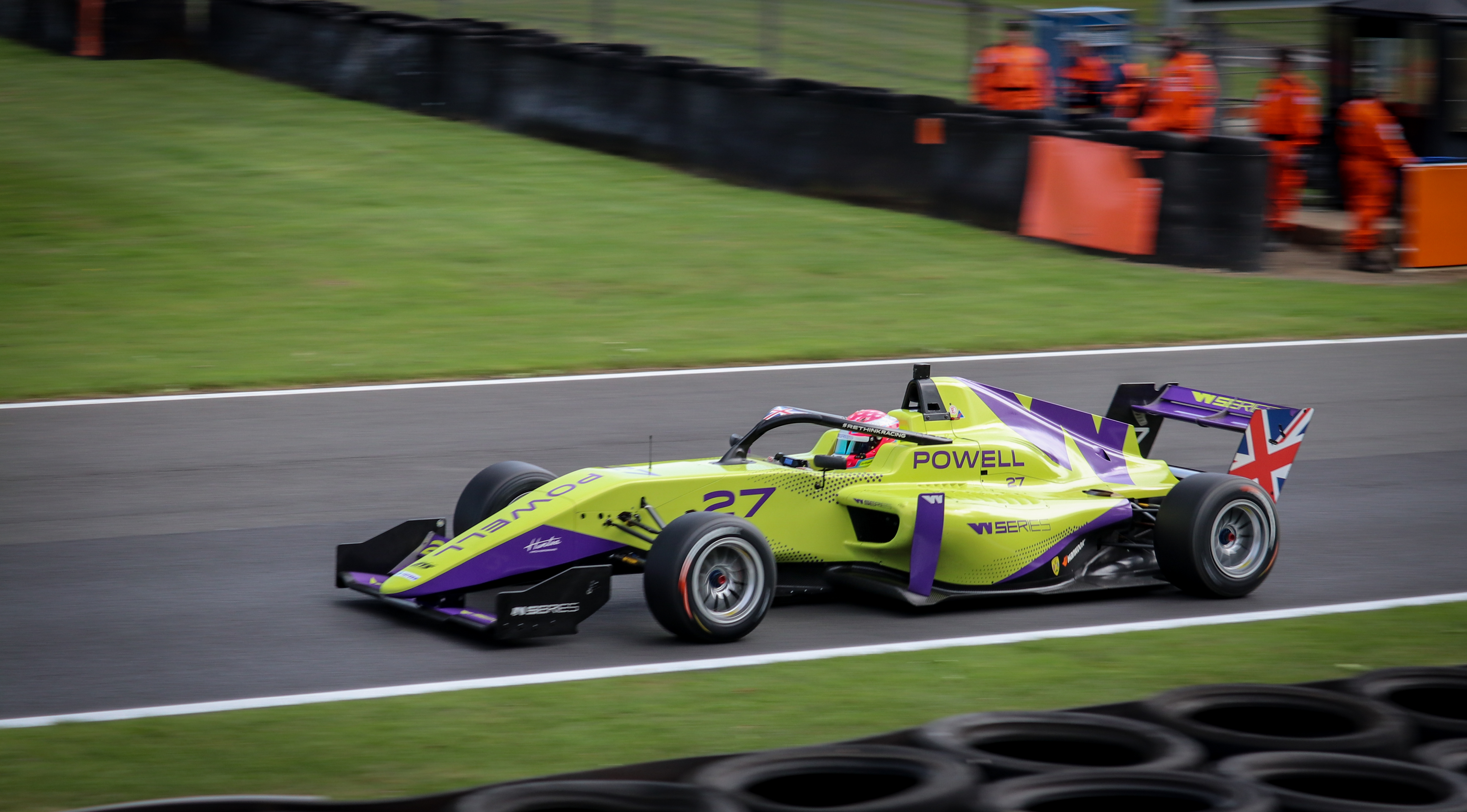
Powell on her way to victory in the 2019 W Series Brands Hatch round

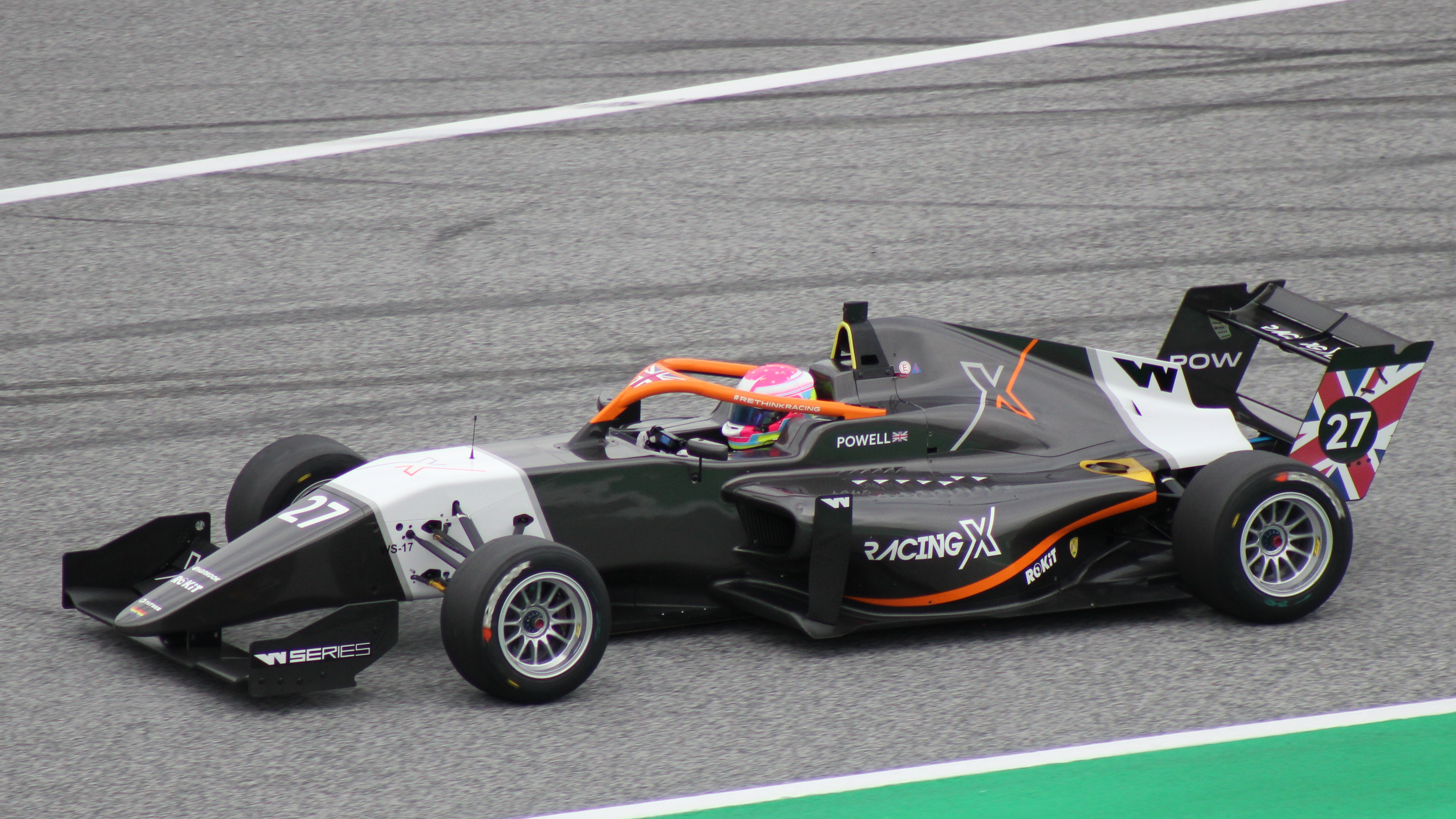
Powell contesting a round of the 2021 W Series at the Red Bull Ring

Powell participated in the inaugural W Series Championship in 2019. She won the season-ending race at Brands Hatch along with three other podium finishes, finishing 3rd overall in the standings.

Powell returned to W Series in 2021 competing with the newly formed Racing X team. Powell dominated the first race of the season at the Red Bull Ring, taking her first pole position, setting the fastest lap and leading every lap to take the race win. Powell finished the season with three wins, five podiums & 132 points, as she went on to finish runner-up to Jamie Chadwick.

Powell moved to Click2Drive Bristol Street Motors Racing for the 2022 season. She finished third in the standings, with one win, four podiums, one pole position, and one fastest lap.

== Commentary career ==
Powell joined the Sky Sports Formula 2 commentary team when the 2020 season resumed in July 2020, after delays and cancellations due to the COVID-19 pandemic. She has commentated at the Goodwood Festival of Speed, and currently works for Whisper Entertainment's F1 on Channel 4. Powell also works for F1 TV as part-time commentator for Formula One. Powell has also been a co-commentator for F1 Academy since 2024.

== Coach mentor career ==
Powell also serves as a coach mentor and currently manages Abbi Pulling, 2024 champion of the F1 Academy championship and currently driving in the GB3 Championship.

== Personal life ==
Powell attended The Cotswold School. In 2014, she was included in the BBC series 100 Women.

== Racing record ==
=== Career summary ===
Season	Series	Team	Races	Wins	Poles	F/Laps	Podiums	Points	Position
2007	Ginetta Junior Championship	Tockwith Motorsport	11	0	0	0	0	62	16th
2007	Ginetta Junior Winter Series	Tockwith Motorsport	3	0	0	0	0	?	5th
2008	Ginetta Junior Championship	Tockwith Motorsport/Muzz Racing	24	0	0	0	4	326	9th
2009	Formula Renault UK	Manor Competition	20	0	0	0	0	88	18th
2009	Formula Palmer Audi	Motorsport Vision	3	0	0	0	0	33	25th
2010	Formula Renault BARC	Hillspeed	12	2	2	0	7	288	**1st**
2010	Formula Renault UK Winter Series	Manor Competition	7	0	0	0	0	53	12th
2010	Ginetta G50 Cup	Tockwith	14	0	0	0	0	163	16th
2010	Ginetta G50 Cup	CDR	3	0	0	0	0	163	16th
2011	Formula Renault UK	Manor Competition	20	0	0	0	0	258	9th
2011	Formula Renault 2.0 NEC	SL Formula Racing	2	0	0	0	0	24	35th
2011	MRF Formula 1600 Delhi	Sidvin/Petes	2	0	0	0	2	33	**2nd**
2011	InterSteps Championship	Motaworld	1	0	0	0	0	12	14th
2012	GP3 Series	Status Grand Prix	16	0	0	0	0	1	19th
2012	Formula Ford 1600 – Walter Hayes Trophy	?	1	0	0	0	0	N/A	12th
2012–13	MRF Challenge Formula 2000	MRF Racing	10	0	0	1	2	79	5th
2013	GP3 Series	Bamboo Engineering	2	0	0	0	0	0	31st
2013	MSV F3 Cup – Class A	Mark Bailey Racing	18	5	1	11	8	396	**2nd**
2013	British Formula 3 International Series – National B	Mark Bailey Racing	3	2	2	3	2	0	NC†
2014	Asian Formula Renault Series – International Class	FRD Racing Team	11	5	5	1	9	242	**1st**
2014	British Formula 3 International Series	Carlin Motorsport	3	0	0	0	1	16	15th
2014	MSV F3 Cup – Cup Class	Mark Bailey Racing	4	2	1	1	4	116	11th
2015	Silverstone 24 Hours – Class 3	Andrew Palmer	1	0	0	0	0	N/A	4th
2015–16	MRF Challenge Formula 2000	MRF Racing	4	0	0	0	0	9	18th
2018–19	Jaguar I-Pace eTrophy	Jaguar VIP Car	1	0	0	0	0	0	NC†
2019	W Series	Hitech GP	6	1	0	0	4	76	**3rd**
2019	WeatherTech SportsCar Championship – GTD	Heinricher Racing with Meyer Shank Racing	1	0	0	0	0	19	59th
2019–20	Jaguar I-Pace eTrophy	Jaguar ran racing eTROPHY Team Germany	10	0	0	1	2	70	4th
2019–20	Formula E	Envision Virgin Racing	Test driver						
2020–21	Formula E	Envision Virgin Racing	Simulator/Development driver						
2021	W Series	Racing X	8	3	2	4	5	132	**2nd**
2021–22	Formula E	Envision Racing	Simulator/Development driver						
2022	W Series	Click2Drive Bristol Street Motors Racing	7	1	1	1	4	86	**3rd**
2022–23	Formula E	Envision Racing	Simulator/Development driver						
2023–24	Formula E	Envision Racing	Simulator/Development driver						
2024–25	Formula E	Envision Racing	Simulator/Development driver						
2025–26	Formula E	Envision Racing	Simulator/Development driver						

^{†} As Powell was a guest driver, she was ineligible for points.

=== Complete Formula Renault 2.0 NEC results ===
(key) (Races in bold indicate pole position) (Races in italics indicate fastest lap)

Year	Entrant	1	2	3	4	5	6	7	8	9	10	11	12	13	14	15	16	17	18	19	20	DC	Points
2011	SL Formula Racing	HOC; 1	HOC; 2	HOC; 3	SPA; 1	SPA; 2	NÜR; 1	NÜR; 2	ASS; 1	ASS; 2	ASS; 3	OSC; 1; 10	OSC; 2; 8	ZAN; 1	ZAN; 2	MST; 1	MST; 2	MST; 3	MNZ; 1	MNZ; 2	MNZ; 3	35th	24

=== Complete GP3 Series results ===
(key) (Races in bold indicate pole position) (Races in italics indicate fastest lap)

Year	Entrant	1	2	3	4	5	6	7	8	9	10	11	12	13	14	15	16	DC	Points
2012	Status Grand Prix	CAT; FEA; Ret	CAT; SPR; 11	MON; FEA; 11	MON; SPR; 22	VAL; FEA; 18	VAL; SPR; Ret	SIL; FEA; 17	SIL; SPR; Ret	HOC; FEA; 19	HOC; SPR; Ret	HUN; FEA; 19	HUN; SPR; 20	SPA; FEA; 18	SPA; SPR; 12	MNZ; FEA; 12	MNZ; SPR; 8	19th	1
2013	Bamboo Engineering	CAT; FEA	CAT; SPR	VAL; FEA	VAL; SPR	SIL; FEA	SIL; SPR	NÜR; FEA	NÜR; SPR	HUN; FEA	HUN; SPR	SPA; FEA	SPA; SPR	MNZ; FEA	MNZ; SPR	YMC; FEA; 19	YMC; SPR; 20	31st	0

=== Complete W Series results ===
(key) (Races in bold indicate pole position) (Races in italics indicate fastest lap)

Year	Team	1	2	3	4	5	6	7	8	DC	Points
2019	Hitech GP	HOC; 2	ZOL; 3	MIS; Ret	NOR; Ret	ASS; 2	BRH; 1			3rd	76
2021	Racing X	**RBR1**; 1	RBR2; 8	**SIL**; 1	HUN; 2	SPA; 4	ZAN; 1	COA1; 3	COA2; 6	2nd	132
2022	Click2Drive Bristol Street Motors Racing	MIA1; Ret	MIA2; 2	CAT; 3	SIL; 14	LEC; 5	HUN; 1	SIN; 2		3rd	86

=== Complete WeatherTech SportsCar Championship results ===
(key) (Races in bold indicate pole position) (Races in italics indicate fastest lap)

Year	Entrant	Class	Make	Engine	1	2	3	4	5	6	7	8	9	10	11	Rank	Points
2019	Heinricher Racing with Meyer Shank Racing	GTD	Acura NSX GT3	Acura 3.5 L Turbo V6	DAY	SEB	MDO	DET	WGL	MOS	LIM	ELK	VIR; 12	LGA	PET	59th	19

=== Complete Jaguar I-Pace eTrophy results ===
(key) (Races in bold indicate pole position)

Year	Team	Car	Class	1	2	3	4	5	6	7	8	9	10	D.C.	Points
2018–19	Jaguar VIP Car	Jaguar I-PACE eTROPHY	G	ADR; 5	MEX	HKG	SYX	RME	PAR	MCO	BER	NYC	NYC	NC†	0
2019–20	Jaguar ran racing eTROPHY Team Germany	Jaguar I-PACE eTROPHY	P	ADR; 3^{3}	ADR; 3^{3}	MEX; 8^{5}	BER; 6^{5}	BER; 7^{6}	BER; 5^{5}	BER; 5^{5}	BER; 10^{6}	BER; 5^{5}	BER; 4^{4}	4th	70

^{†} As Powell was a guest driver, she was ineligible for points.

Sporting positions
Preceded by Kieren Clark	Formula Renault BARC; Champion; 2010	Succeeded by Dino Zamparelli
Preceded by Julio Acosta	Asian Formula Renault Series; Champion; 2014	Succeeded by Dan Wells
