= Víctor Jiménez =

Spanish racing driver

Victor Jiménez
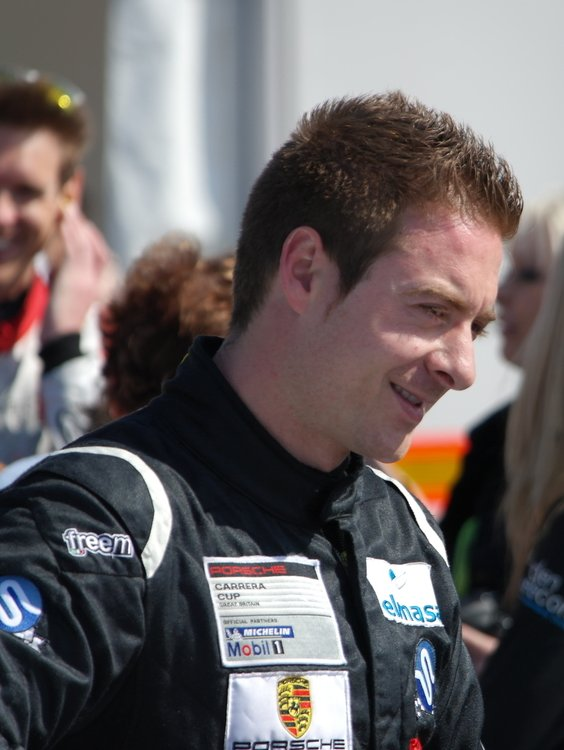
- Victor Jimenez seen at Brands Hatch
- Nationality: (Spain) Spanish
- Born: Víctor Jiménez García; 4 February 1984 (age 42)

Porsche Carrera Cup Great Britain career
- Debut season: 2012
- Current team: Redline Racing
- Car number: 25
- Starts: 59
- Wins: 0
- Poles: 0
- Best finish: 4th in 2014

Previous series
- 2010 2011: Formula Palmer Audi; Formula Renault BARC

Víctor Jiménez García (born 4 February 1984) is a Spanish racing driver from Madrid, Spain currently competing in the 2014 Porsche Carrera Cup Great Britain driving for the Redline Racing team, in the Pro class. In prior years, Jiménez was in the Pro-Am 1 class.

== Racing career ==
=== Formula Palmer Audi ===
Jiménez competed in the second half of the 2010 Formula Palmer Audi championship. He finished the championship in 16th place with 77 points, with his best result being a tenth place finish at Silverstone.

=== Formula Renault BARC ===
2011 saw Jiménez compete in the Protyre Formula Renault BARC championship, driving for the Fortec Motorsport team. The season was contested over 12 rounds at six meetings. Notable highlights for Jiménez were a sixth place finish at Donington Park in round two and fastest lap at Brands Hatch in round four. He finished the championship in 16th place with 65 points. For the post-season Formula Renault BARC Winter Series, Jiménez moved to Hillspeed, and took five podium finishes – three second places and two third places – over the six races at Snetterton and Rockingham; the results were sufficient to win the championship with 156 points.

=== Porsche Carrera Cup Great Britain ===
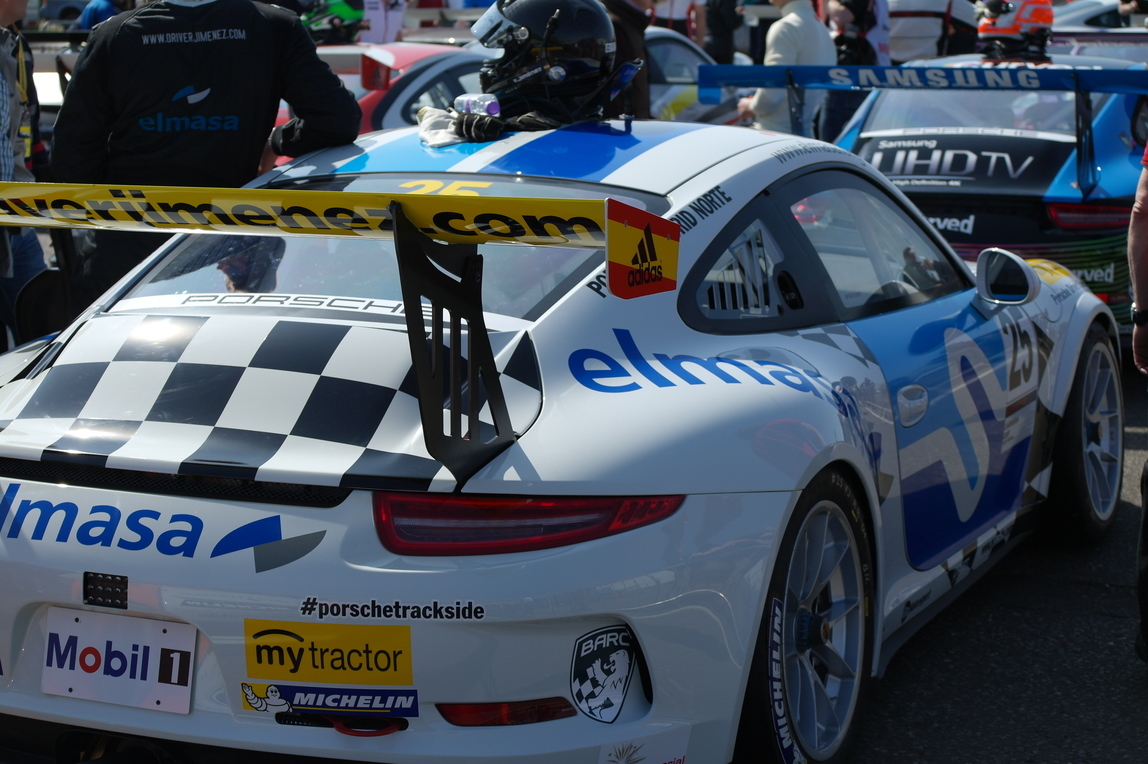
Jiménez's car at Brands Hatch, in 2014.

In 2012, Jiménez joined the Porsche Carrera Cup GB with Redline Racing in the Pro-Am 1 class, where he finished fourth in class and 12th overall with 92 points. His highest place race finish overall was eighth place, on several occasions; however the class results were more successful including three wins, two second places, nine third places, three fastest laps and three pole positions. He remained with Redline for a second season in 2013, and became Pro-Am 1 class champion and finished sixth in the overall classification with 194 points. He recorded two overall podiums at Croft and Rockingham, as well as achieving ten class wins.

In 2014, Jiménez competed in the main professional class with Redline Racing. Whilst entrant numbers have been lower for this season, Jiménez is currently third in the drivers' championship, with two podiums – a second place and a third place – in the opening three meetings.
