= Ivan Taranov (racing driver) =

Russian racing driver (born 1994)

- Nationality: (Russia) Russian
- Born: 30 October 1994 (age 32) Tolyatti, Russia

GP3 Series career
- Debut season: 2014
- Current team: Hilmer Motorsport
- Car number: 17
- Starts: 2
- Wins: 0
- Poles: 0
- Fastest laps: 0
- Best finish: 34th in 2014

Previous series
- 2013 2011–13: Formula Renault 2.0 Alps; Protyre Formula Renault

Ivan Taranov (Russian: Ива́н Тара́нов, IPA: [ɪˈvan tɐˈranəf]; born 30 October 1994) is a Russian racing driver.

== Career ==
=== Karting ===
Born in Tolyatti, Taranov began karting in 2010, finishing eighth in the Daytona Max Lightweight Sprint Series.

=== Formula Renault ===
In 2011, Taranov moved into open-wheel racing, competing in Formula Renault BARC with Daytona Motorsport. He ended the season fourteenth, finishing in ten out of the series' twelve races.

Taranov remained in the series for the 2012 season, but switched to Antel Motorsport. He improved to tenth place in the series standings with just one retirement in fourteen races.

After competing for Scorpio Motorsport in the final round of the 2012 season, Taranov signed with the team for the 2013 season. He missed the rounds at Croft and Rockingham due to funding issues, but returned for the finale at Silverstone, where he scored his first wins in the series. He also competed in four races of the Formula Renault 2.0 Alps series with Tech 1 Racing.

=== GP3 Series ===
In 2014, Taranov graduated to the GP3 Series with Hilmer Motorsport supported by Force India F1 Team. However, he only competed in the opening race weekend. He did not finish race 1, and ended race 2 in 20th place.

== Racing record ==
=== Career summary ===
Season	Series	Team	Races	Wins	Poles	F/Laps	Podiums	Points	Position
2011	Formula Renault BARC	Daytona Motorsport	12	0	0	0	0	84	14th
2011	Formula Renault 2.0 Finals Series - FR BARC	Antel Motorsport	6	0	0	0	3	98	7th
2012	Formula Renault BARC	Antel Motorsport	14	0	0	0	0	142	10th
2012	Formula Renault BARC	Scorpio Motorsport	14	0	0	0	0	142	10th
2012	Formula Renault BARC Winter Series	Core Motorsport	4	0	0	0	0	43	8th
2012	Formula Renault 2.0 Italia	Green Goblin by Facondini	2	0	0	0	0	2	20th
2012	Single-seater V de V Challenge	Antel Motorsport	2	0	0	0	0	26	43rd
2013	Protyre Formula Renault Championship	Scorpio Motorsport	10	2	1	1	3	140	12th
2013	Formula Renault 2.0 Alps	Tech 1 Racing	4	0	0	0	0	0	34th
2014	GP3 Series	Hilmer Motorsport	2	0	0	0	0	0	34th

=== Complete Formula Renault 2.0 Alps Series results ===
(key) (Races in bold indicate pole position; races in italics indicate fastest lap)

Year	Team	1	2	3	4	5	6	7	8	9	10	11	12	13	14	Pos	Points
2013	Tech 1 Racing	VLL; 1; 13	VLL; 2; 25	IMO1; 1	IMO1; 2	SPA; 1	SPA; 2	MNZ; 1	MNZ; 2	MIS; 1	MIS; 2	MUG; 1	MUG; 2	IMO2; 1	IMO2; 2	34th	0

=== Complete GP3 Series results ===
(key) (Races in bold indicate pole position; races in italics indicate fastest lap)

Year	Team	1	2	3	4	5	6	7	8	9	10	11	12	13	14	15	16	17	18	Pos	Points
2014	Hilmer Motorsport	CAT; 1; 22†	CAT; 2; 25	RBR; 1	RBR; 2	SIL; 1	SIL; 2	HOC; 1	HOC; 2	HUN; 1	HUN; 2	SPA; 1	SPA; 2	MNZ; 1	MNZ; 2	SOC; 1	SOC; 2	YMC; 1	YMC; 2	34th	0
