= Jeffrey Schmidt (racing driver) =

Swiss racing driver (born 1994)

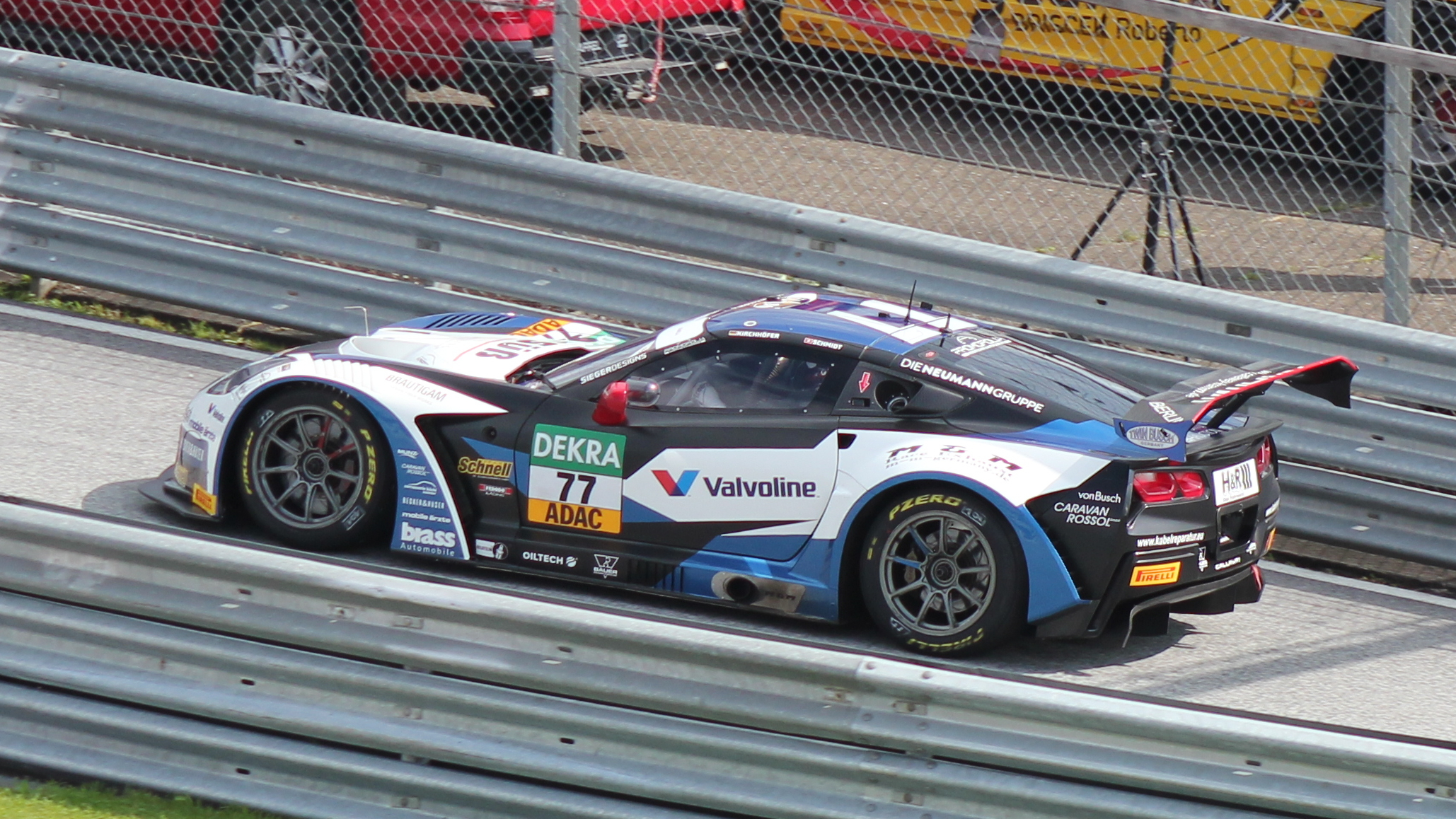
- Schmidt in 2021
- Born: Jeffrey Schmidt; 23 March 1994 (age 32); Liestal, Switzerland
- Nationality: (Switzerland) Swiss
- Categorisation: FIA Silver

Championship titles
- 2015–16: Porsche GT3 Cup Challenge Middle East

Jeffrey Schmidt (born 23 March 1994) is a Swiss racing driver who last competed in GT World Challenge Europe Endurance Cup for Sky – Tempesta Racing.

== Career ==
Schmidt made his single-seater debut in 2011, racing for HAITECH Racing in ADAC Formel Masters. Taking a best result of fourth at both Zolder and Red Bull Ring with them, before switching to Mücke Motorsport for the final three rounds, as he closed out the year 14th in points. Remaining in the series for 2012, Schmidt switched to Lotus for his sophomore season. Schmidt scored his only series win in race three at Lausitzring, before taking four more podiums to finish third in points in his last season in single-seaters.

In 2013, Schmidt switched to Porsche Carrera Cup Germany, joining Project 1 for his first season in sports car racing. In his rookie season in the series, Schmidt took his maiden series podium by finishing third at the Lausitzring, helping him end the year tenth in points. Schmidt remained in the series for 2014, as he switched to Lechner Racing for his sophomore season in Carrera Cup competition. Schmidt scored two podiums, both at the Nürburgring by finishing third in both races, on his way to 12th in the A-class standings. During 2014, Schmidt also took his first Porsche Supercup podium with the same team by finishing second at the Red Bull Ring in his second and final start of the season.

Staying with Lechner Racing for 2015, Schmidt returned to full-time competition in Porsche Carrera Cup Germany and made his full-season debut in Porsche Supercup. In the former, Schmidt took two wins at Red Bull Ring and Hockenheimring to secure third in points. In the latter meanwhile, Schmidt took a best result of fourth at the season-ending round at Circuit of the Americas on his way to tenth in points. At the end of the year, Schmidt raced in the 2015–16 Porsche GT3 Cup Challenge Middle East for Al Nabooda Racing, in which he took nine wins and the series title in early 2016.

For the rest of 2016, Schmidt returned to Lechner Racing to once again race in both Porsche Carrera Cup Germany and Porsche Supercup. In the German series, Schmidt took two wins, both at the Hockenheimring albeit in different rounds, and scored four more podiums to end the year fourth in the standings. In Supercup, Schmidt scored three podiums in the ten-race season, finishing third at the Red Bull Ring, Hockenheimring and Monza as he closed out the year sixth in points.

Schmidt then transitioned to GT3 competition for 2017, racing for Audi-affiliated Land-Motorsport in ADAC GT Masters. In his rookie season in the series, Schmidt took four podiums with a best result of second at Zandvoort and ended the year ninth in points. During 2017, Schmidt also competed for the same team in the 24 Hours of Daytona in class, finishing second in class in his maiden race in GT3 machinery.

Remaining in ADAC GT Masters for 2018, Schmidt switched to Audi-fielding Mücke Motorsport for his second season in the series. In the second round of the season at Most, Schmidt qualified on pole and took his maiden series win in race one. Four rounds later, Schmidt took what turned out to be his final podium of the season, finishing third in race two at Sachsenring, en route to an eighth-place points finish. During 2018, Schmidt also drove for Land-Motorsport in the 24 Hours of Daytona and the 24 Hours of Spa, finishing seventh in the latter and third at Spa.

In 2019, Schmidt stayed with Mücke Motorsport to race in ADAC GT Masters alongside Christopher Haase. In his sophomore season with the team, Schmidt scored a lone podium in the season-opening race at Oschersleben, which helped him finish 19th at the end of the season. In 2020, Schmidt remained in ADAC GT Masters, albeit switching to Corvette-fielding Callaway Competition alongside Markus Pommer. In his fourth season in the series, Schmidt took his only win of the season at Sachsenring, which helped him finish 15th in points.

Schmidt remained with Callaway Competition for 2021, alongside Marvin Kirchhöfer in his second season with the team and the Corvette C7 GT3-R. The duo took their only win of the season in race two at the Red Bull Ring, a weekend where they also took their only other podium of the season by finishing third in race one. However, their early-season form ended following a fire during race two at Lausitzring, as the pair finished no higher than ninth in the remaining races on their way to tenth in points.

After Callaway ended their GT3 programme in early 2022, Schmidt announced his retirement from racing, to focus on Novexus AG, a company he founded in 2017 after graduating from the University of Basel. A year later, Schmidt made a one-off appearance in the 24 Hours of Spa for Sky – Tempesta Racing following an invitation to test the McLaren 720S by Marvin Kirchhöfer. Driving alongside Eddie Cheever III, Jonathan Hui and Chris Froggatt, the Swiss finished third in the Bronze class in his only race of the season.

== Karting record ==
=== Karting career summary ===
Season	Series	Team	Position
2005	Swiss Kart Championship – Super Mini		4th
2005	Bridgestone Cup Switzerland – Super Mini		3rd
2006	Swiss Kart Championship – Super Mini	KC Möhlin	3rd
2007	Bridgestone Cup Switzerland – KF3		7th
2007	Schweizer Kart Meisterschaft – KF3	Lugano KT	4th
2007	Championnat de France – Junior		12th
2007	Karting European Championship – KF3		NC
2008	Torneo Industrie – KF3	Fanclub Jeffrey Schmidt	
2008	Andrea Margutti Trophy – KF3	Fanclub Jeffrey Schmidt	NC
2008	Karting European Championship – KF3	Fanclub Jeffrey Schmidt	
2008	Italian Open Masters – KF3	Fanclub Jeffrey Schmidt	51st
2008	Schweizer Kart Meisterschaft – KF3		2nd
2008	Championnat de France – KF3		9th
2008	Bridgestone Cup Europe – KF3		31st
2009	South Garda Winter Cup – KF3	KSB Racing Team	17th
2009	Andrea Margutti Trophy – KF3	KSB Racing Team	6th
2009	WSK International Series – KF3	KSB Racing Team	30th
2009	Karting European Championship – KF3	KSB Racing Team	48th
2009	Deutsche Kart-Meisterschaft – KF3	Roland Schmidt	11th
2009	Karting World Cup – KF3	Fanclub Jeffrey Schmidt	27th
2009	Bridgestone Cup Europe – KF2		3rd
2010	South Garda Winter Cup – KF2	Keijzer Racing	5th
2010	Andrea Margutti Trophy – KF2	Keijzer Racing	31st
2010	Deutsche Kart-Meisterschaft – KF2	Keijzer Racing	16th
2010	WSK Euro Series – KF2	Keijzer Racing	34th
2010	Karting European Championship – KF2	Keijzer Racing	65th

== Racing record ==
=== Racing career summary ===
Season	Series	Team	Races	Wins	Poles	F/Laps	Podiums	Points	Position
2011	ADAC Formel Masters	HAITECH-Racing	17	0	0	0	0	62	14th
2011	ADAC Formel Masters	ADAC Berlin-Brandenburg e.V.	6	0	0	0	0	62	14th
2012	ADAC Formel Masters	Lotus	23	1	2	1	5	193	**3rd**
2013	Porsche Carrera Cup Germany	Team Deutsche Post by Project 1	17	0	0	0	1	105	10th
2013	Porsche Supercup	Team Allyouneed by Project 1	2	0	0	0	0	0	NC†
2013	24 Hours of Nürburgring – SP7	Haribo Racing Team	1	0	0	0	0	—N/a	DNF
2013–14	Porsche GT3 Cup Challenge Middle East		2	1	1	0	1	0	NC†
2014	Porsche Carrera Cup Germany	Lechner Racing Academy ME	16	0	0	0	2	92	12th
2014	Porsche Carrera Cup Germany	QPOD Walter Lechner Racing	2	0	0	0	0	92	12th
2014	Porsche Supercup	Walter Lechner Racing Team	2	0	0	0	1	28	15th
2015	Porsche Carrera Cup Germany	Lechner Racing Middle East	17	2	2	0	4	197	**3rd**
2015	Porsche Supercup	The Heart of Racing by Lechner	10	0	0	0	0	67	10th
2015	VLN Series – Cup	Lechner Racing	1	0	0	0	1	7	NC
2015	NGK Racing Series – Class 6		1	0	0	0	0	0	NC
2015–16	Porsche GT3 Cup Challenge Middle East	Al Nabooda Racing	12	9	9	7	10	267	**1st**
2016	Porsche Carrera Cup Germany	Team Lechner Huber Racing	16	2	3	2	6	192	4th
2016	Porsche Supercup	Lechner Racing Middle East	10	0	0	0	3	114	6th
2017	IMSA SportsCar Championship – GTD	Montaplast by Land-Motorsport	1	0	0	0	1	32	55th
2017	ADAC GT Masters	Montaplast by Land-Motorsport	13	0	0	1	4	91	9th
2017	VLN Series – SP9	Montaplast by Land-Motorsport	1	0	0	0	1	0	NC
2018	IMSA SportsCar Championship – GTD	Montaplast by Land-Motorsport	1	0	0	0	0	24	53rd
2018	VLN Series – SP9 Pro	Montaplast by Land-Motorsport	1	0	0	0	0	0	NC
2018	Blancpain GT Series Endurance Cup	Montaplast by Land-Motorsport	1	0	0	0	1	28	16th
2018	Blancpain GT Series Endurance Cup	Attempto Racing	3	0	0	0	0	28	16th
2018	ADAC GT Masters	BWT Mücke Motorsport	14	1	1	1	2	62	8th
2018	24H GT Series – A6 Pro	Car Collection Motorsport	1	0	0	0	0	0	NC
2019	ADAC GT Masters	BWT Mücke Motorsport	14	0	0	0	1	59	19th
2020	ADAC GT Masters	Callaway Competition	14	1	0	0	1	61	15th
2021	ADAC GT Masters	Callaway Competition	14	1	0	0	2	95	10th
2023	GT World Challenge Europe Endurance Cup	Sky – Tempesta Racing	1	0	0	0	0	0	NC
2023	GT World Challenge Europe Endurance Cup – Bronze Cup	Sky – Tempesta Racing	1	0	0	0	1	29	13th

^{†} As Schmidt was a guest driver, he was ineligible to score points.

=== Complete ADAC Formel Masters results ===
(key)

Year	Team	1	2	3	4	5	6	7	8	9	10	11	12	13	14	15	16	17	18	19	20	21	22	23	24	DC	Points
2011	HAITECH-Racing	OSC; 1; 6	OSC; 2; 8	OSC; 3; 6	SAC; 1; 11	SAC; 2; 7	SAC; 3; 6	ZOL; 1; 4	ZOL; 2; 19	ZOL; 3 DNS	NÜR; 1; 10	NÜR; 2; 12	NÜR; 3; 12	RBR; 1; 4	RBR; 2; 18	RBR; 3 Ret	LAU; 1 Ret	LAU; 2; 19	LAU; 3; 14							14th	62
2011	ADAC Berlin-Brandenburg e.V.																			ASS; 1; 18	ASS; 2; 10	ASS; 3; 13	HOC; 1; 10	HOC; 2; 10	HOC; 3; 13	14th	62
2012	Lotus	**OSC**; **1**; 3	**OSC**; **2**; 16	OSC; 3; 8	ZAN; 1; 5	ZAN; 2; 12	ZAN; 3; 4	SAC; 1; 5	SAC; 2; 3	SAC; 3 C	NÜR1; 1; 4	NÜR1; 2; 5	NÜR1; 3; 4	RBR; 1; 8	RBR; 2; 12	RBR; 3; 7	LAU; 1; 5	LAU; 2; 3	LAU; 3; 1	NÜR2; 1; 4	NÜR2; 2; 5	NÜR2; 3 Ret	HOC; 1; 4	HOC; 2; 4	HOC; 3; 2	3rd	193

=== Complete Porsche Supercup results ===
(key) (Races in bold indicate pole position) (Races in italics indicate fastest lap)

Year	Team	1	2	3	4	5	6	7	8	9	10	11	Pos.	Pts
2013	Team Allyouneed by Project 1	CAT	MON	SIL; 24	NÜR; 13	HUN	SPA	MNZ	YMC	YMC			NC‡	0‡
2014	Walter Lechner Racing Team	CAT; 6	MON; DNS	RBR; 2	SIL	HOC	HUN	SPA	MNZ	COA	COA		15th	28
2015	The Heart of Racing by Lechner	CAT; 8	MON; 14	RBR; 16	SIL; 10	HUN; 9	SPA; 7	SPA; 5	MNZ; 32†	MNZ; 9	COA; C	COA; 4	10th	67
2016	Lechner Racing Middle East	CAT; 6	MON; 7	RBR; 3	SIL; 8	HUN; 4	HOC; 3	SPA; Ret	MNZ; 8	COA; 6	COA; 3		6th	114

^{‡} As Schmidt was a guest driver, he was ineligible for points.
^{†} Driver did not finish the race, but was classified as he completed over 75% of the race distance.

=== Complete IMSA SportsCar Championship results ===
(key) (Races in bold indicate pole position; results in italics indicate fastest lap)

Year	Team	Class	Make	Engine	1	2	3	4	5	6	7	8	9	10	11	12	Pos.	Points
2017	Montaplast by Land-Motorsport	GTD	Audi R8 LMS	Audi 5.2 L V10	DAY; 2	SEB	LBH	AUS	BEL	WGL	MOS	LIM	ELK	VIR	LGA	PET	55th	32
2018	Montaplast by Land-Motorsport	GTD	Audi R8 LMS GT3	Audi 5.2 L V10	DAY; 7	SEB	MOH	DET	WGL	MOS	LIM	ELK	VIR	LGA	PET		53th	24

=== Complete ADAC GT Masters results ===
(key) (Races in bold indicate pole position) (Races in italics indicate fastest lap)

Year	Team	Car	1	2	3	4	5	6	7	8	9	10	11	12	13	14	Pos	Points
2017	Montaplast by Land-Motorsport	Audi R8 LMS	OSC; 1; 5	OSC; 2; 5	LAU; 1; 13	LAU; 2; 11	RBR; 1; 20	RBR; 2 Ret	ZAN; 1 DNS	ZAN; 2; 2	NÜR; 1; 8	NÜR; 2; 3	SAC; 1; 11	SAC; 2; 3	HOC; 1; 8	HOC; 2; 3	9th	91
2018	BWT Mücke Motorsport	Audi R8 LMS	OSC; 1; 8	OSC; 2; 26	**MST**; **1**; 1	MST; 2; 9	RBR; 1; 19	RBR; 2; 8	NÜR; 1; 12	NÜR; 2; 12	ZAN; 1; 28	ZAN; 2; 9	SAC; 1; 5	SAC; 2; 3	HOC; 1; 17	HOC; 2; 13	8th	62
2019	BWT Mücke Motorsport	Audi R8 LMS Evo	OSC; 1; 3	OSC; 2; 11	MST; 1; 26	MST; 2; 9	RBR; 1; 9	RBR; 2; 10	ZAN; 1; 15	ZAN; 2; 14	NÜR; 1; 21	NÜR; 2; 9	HOC; 1; 10	HOC; 2; 19	SAC; 1; 17	SAC; 2; 17	19th	59
2020	Callaway Competition	Corvette C7 GT3-R	LAU1; 1 Ret	LAU1; 2; 12	NÜR; 1 Ret	NÜR; 2; 5	HOC; 1 Ret	HOC; 2 Ret	SAC; 1; 8	SAC; 2; 1	RBR; 1; 21	RBR; 2; 18	LAU2; 1; 8	LAU2; 2; 18	OSC; 1; 13	OSC; 2; 14	15th	61
2021	Callaway Competition	Corvette C7 GT3-R	OSC; 1; 13	OSC; 2 Ret	RBR; 1; 3	RBR; 2; 1	ZAN; 1; 7	ZAN; 2; 4	LAU; 1 Ret	LAU; 2; 25	SAC; 1; 14	SAC; 2; 9	HOC; 1; 11	HOC; 2; 9	NÜR; 1; 13	NÜR; 2; 13	10th	95

=== Complete GT World Challenge Europe results ===
==== GT World Challenge Europe Endurance Cup ====
(Races in bold indicate pole position) (Races in italics indicate fastest lap)

Year	Team	Car	Class	1	2	3	4	5	6	7	Pos.	Points
2018	Attempto Racing	Audi R8 LMS	Pro	MON; 13	SIL; 22	LEC; Ret					16th	28
2018	Montaplast by Land-Motorsport	Audi R8 LMS	Pro				SPA; 6H; 1	SPA; 12H; 9	SPA; 24H; 3	CAT	16th	28
2023	Sky – Tempesta Racing	McLaren 720S GT3 Evo	Bronze	MNZ	LEC	SPA; 6H; 32	SPA; 12H; 14	SPA; 24H; 18	NÜR	CAT	13th	29
