= 2016 Porsche Supercup =

24th Porsche Supercup season

The 2016 Porsche Mobil 1 Supercup was the 24th Porsche Supercup season. It began on 13 May at Circuit de Catalunya and finished on 23 October at Circuit of the Americas, after ten scheduled races, all of which were support events for the 2016 Formula One season.

== Teams and drivers ==
Full list of drivers that participated in the 2016 season:

Team	No.	Drivers	Class	Rounds
(Austria) Lechner MSG Racing Team	1	(Germany) Michael Ammermüller		All
(Austria) Lechner MSG Racing Team	2	(Germany) Sven Müller		All
(Austria) Lechner MSG Racing Team	34	(Norway) Dennis Olsen	G	2
(Austria) Lechner MSG Racing Team	34	(Netherlands) Charlie Frijns	G	7
(Poland) FÖRCH Racing	3	(Mexico) Santiago Creel		All
(Poland) FÖRCH Racing	9	(Germany) Chris Bauer		All
(Poland) FÖRCH Racing by Lukas Motorsport	4	(Germany) Patrick Eisemann		All
(Poland) FÖRCH Racing by Lukas Motorsport	5	(Poland) Robert Lukas		All
(Poland) FÖRCH Racing by Lukas Motorsport	35	(Mexico) Pablo Sánchez López	G	2
(Poland) FÖRCH Racing by Lukas Motorsport	54	(Hungary) György Lekeny	G	5
(Poland) FÖRCH Racing by Lukas Motorsport	66	(Mexico) Pablo Sánchez López	G	8–9
(Switzerland) Fach Auto Tech	6	(Switzerland) Philipp Frommenwiler		All
(Switzerland) Fach Auto Tech	7	(Italy) Matteo Cairoli		All
(Bahrain) Lechner Racing Middle East	8	(Republic of Ireland) Ryan Cullen	R	All
(Bahrain) Lechner Racing Middle East	19	(Switzerland) Jeffrey Schmidt		All
(Bahrain) Lechner Racing Middle East	20	(Kuwait) Zaid Ashkanani	R	All
(United States) MOMO-Megatron Team Partrax	10	(United Kingdom) Ben Barker		1–4
(United States) MOMO-Megatron Team Partrax	10	(Netherlands) Jaap van Lagen		6
(United States) MOMO-Megatron Team Partrax	10	(Spain) Pepe Massot		7, 9
(United States) MOMO-Megatron Team Partrax	10	(Singapore) Sean Hudspeth		8
(United States) MOMO-Megatron Team Partrax	11	(United Kingdom) Paul Rees		All
(United States) MOMO-Megatron Team Partrax	12	(Luxembourg) Dylan Pereira	R	All
(United States) MOMO-Megatron Team Partrax	33	(Norway) Egidio Perfetti	G	2
(United States) MOMO-Megatron Team Partrax	48	(United Kingdom) Dino Zamparelli	G	4
(United States) MOMO-Megatron Team Partrax	68	(Germany) Nico Rindlisbacher	G	9
(Germany) MRS GT-Racing	14	(Germany) Christian Engelhart		1–4, 6–9
(Germany) MRS GT-Racing	14	(Norway) Dennis Olsen		5
(Germany) MRS GT-Racing	15	(Norway) Roar Lindland		All
(Germany) MRS GT-Racing	23	(Denmark) Mikkel O. Pedersen	R	1–2, 6
(Germany) MRS GT-Racing	23	(Belgium) John Wartique		7
(Germany) MRS GT-Racing	23	(Argentina) Pablo Otero		9
(Germany) MRS Cup-Racing	16	(Spain) Víctor Jiménez		1
(Germany) MRS Cup-Racing	16	(Argentina) Pablo Otero		2
(Germany) MRS Cup-Racing	16	(Australia) Sam Power		4
(Germany) MRS Cup-Racing	16	(Belgium) John Wartique	G	5, 8
(Germany) MRS Cup-Racing	16	(Japan) Kenji Kobayashi		6–7
(Germany) MRS Cup-Racing	16	(Argentina) Juan Pipkin		9
(Germany) MRS Cup-Racing	17	(Germany) Christof Langer		All
(France) Martinet by Alméras	18	(France) Steven Palette	R	All
(France) Martinet by Alméras	21	(Switzerland) Glauco Solieri		1–3, 5–9
(France) Martinet by Alméras	21	(France) Thomas Laurent	R	4
(France) Martinet by Alméras	22	(France) Mathieu Jaminet	R	All
(France) Martinet by Alméras	30	(France) Roland Bervillé	G	1–2, 5, 8–9
(France) Pierre Martinet by Alméras	30	(France) Roland Bervillé	G	3
(France) Pierre Martinet by Alméras	41	(Italy) Gianmarco Quaresmini	G	3
(Germany) race:pro motorsport	31	(Austria) Klaus Bachler	G	2–3, 7
(Germany) race:pro motorsport	32	(Austria) Felix Wimmer	G	2–3
(Germany) race:pro motorsport	57	(Netherlands) Larry ten Voorde	G	7
(Italy) Dinamic Motorsport	36	(Italy) Daniele di Amato	G	3, 6, 8
(Italy) Dinamic Motorsport	37	(Italy) Mattia Drudi	G	3, 6, 8
(Italy) Dinamic Motorsport	38	(Italy) Alex de Giacomi	G	3, 8
(Austria) Team Huber Lechner Racing	39	(Netherlands) Wolf Nathan	G	3
(Austria) Team Huber Lechner Racing	40	(Germany) Wolfgang Triller	G	3
(United Kingdom) Team Redline	42	(United Kingdom) Tom Oliphant	G	4
(United Kingdom) Team Redline	43	(United Kingdom) Lewis Plato	G	4
(United Kingdom) Team Parker Racing	44	(United Kingdom) Tom Sharp	G	4
(United Kingdom) Team Parker Racing	45	(United Kingdom) Mark Radcliffe	G	4
(United Kingdom) Redline Racing	46	(United Kingdom) Dan Cammish	G	4
(United Kingdom) Redline Racing	47	(Republic of Ireland) Charlie Eastwood	G	4
(Germany) Rookie Team Deutsche Post by Project 1	49	(United Kingdom) Nick Yelloly	G	4
(Germany) Rookie Team Deutsche Post by Project 1	50	(United Kingdom) Josh Webster	G	4
Porsche Carrera Cup Sweden	51	(Sweden) Lucas Sundahl	G	5
Porsche Carrera Cup Sweden	52	(Finland) Anssi-Jukka Kasi	G	5
Porsche Carrera Cup Sweden	53	(Sweden) Matte Karlsson	G	5
Porsche China Junior Team	55	(Singapore) Andrew Tang	G	6
Porsche China Junior Team	56	(China) Zhang Dasheng	G	6
(Sweden) PFI Racing	58	(Sweden) Henric Skoog	G	7
(Sweden) PFI Racing	59	(Sweden) Kenneth Pantzar	G	7
(Sweden) PFI Racing	60	(Sweden) Pontus Fredricsson	G	7
(Belgium) Speed Lover	61	(Belgium) Pierre Piron	G	7
(Belgium) Speed Lover	62	(Belgium) Jean Glorieux	G	7
(Italy) Ghinzani Arco Motorsport	64	(Italy) Gianmarco Quaresmini	G	8
(Italy) Ghinzani Arco Motorsport	65	(Italy) Matteo Torta	G	8
(United States) Moorespeed	69	(United States) Will Hardeman	G	9
(United States) Moorespeed	70	(United States) Alec Udell	G	9

Icon	Meaning
R	Rookie
G	Guest

== Race calendar and results ==
Round		Circuit	Date	Pole position	Fastest lap	Winning driver	Winning team
1		(Spain) Circuit de Catalunya	15 May	(Italy) Matteo Cairoli	(Italy) Matteo Cairoli	(Italy) Matteo Cairoli	(Switzerland) Fach Auto Tech
2		Circuit de Monaco	29 May	(Italy) Matteo Cairoli	(Germany) Sven Müller	(Italy) Matteo Cairoli	(Switzerland) Fach Auto Tech
3		(Austria) Red Bull Ring	3 July	(Italy) Matteo Cairoli	(Germany) Sven Müller	(Germany) Sven Müller	(Austria) Lechner MSG Racing Team
4		(United Kingdom) Silverstone Circuit	10 July	(France) Mathieu Jaminet	(France) Mathieu Jaminet	(Germany) Sven Müller	(Austria) Lechner MSG Racing Team
5		(Hungary) Hungaroring	24 July	(Poland) Robert Lukas	(Germany) Sven Müller	(Germany) Sven Müller	(Austria) Lechner MSG Racing Team
6		(Germany) Hockenheimring	31 July	(Germany) Sven Müller	(Poland) Robert Lukas	(Italy) Matteo Cairoli	(Switzerland) Fach Auto Tech
7		(Belgium) Circuit de Spa-Francorchamps	28 August	(Germany) Sven Müller (Note: Matteo Cairoli, the original pole position scorer, was given a three-place grid penalty for disregarding yellow flags earlier in free practice.)	(France) Mathieu Jaminet	(France) Mathieu Jaminet	(France) Martinet by Alméras
8		(Italy) Autodromo Nazionale Monza	4 September	(Italy) Matteo Cairoli	(Italy) Mattia Drudi	(Italy) Matteo Cairoli	(Switzerland) Fach Auto Tech
9	R1	(United States) Circuit of the Americas	22 October	(France) Mathieu Jaminet	(Italy) Matteo Cairoli	(France) Mathieu Jaminet	(France) Martinet by Alméras
9	R2	(United States) Circuit of the Americas	23 October	(France) Mathieu Jaminet	(France) Mathieu Jaminet	(France) Mathieu Jaminet	(France) Martinet by Alméras

== Championship standings ==
=== Drivers' Championship ===
Pos.	Driver	CAT (Spain)	MON (Monaco)	RBR (Austria)	SIL (United Kingdom)	HUN (Hungary)	HOC (Germany)	SPA (Belgium)	MNZ (Italy)	COA (United States)		Points
1	(Germany) Sven Müller	2	13	1	1	1	**2**	**2**	4	2	8	163
2	(Italy) Matteo Cairoli	**1**	**1**	**4**	3	7	1	4	**1**	Ret	2	151
3	(France) Mathieu Jaminet	3	5	2	**2**	Ret	8	1	7	**1**	**1**	146
4	(Germany) Michael Ammermüller	5	3	10	13	3	6	5	2	4	5	129
5	(Poland) Robert Lukas	7	8	Ret	6	**2**	4	6	5	3	4	118
6	(Switzerland) Jeffrey Schmidt	6	7	3	8	4	3	Ret	8	6	3	114
7	(Germany) Christian Engelhart	Ret	6	16	11		5	3	Ret	5	6	76
8	(Switzerland) Philipp Frommenwiler	9	12	6	21	5	9	Ret	9	8	13	67
9	(France) Steven Palette	21†	9	5	18	13	7	21	14	9	12	57
10	(Kuwait) Zaid Ashkanani	8	21	13	19	10	15	10	10	24†	10	52
11	(Republic of Ireland) Ryan Cullen	13	14	7	20	8	14	14	Ret	14	14	45
12	(United Kingdom) Ben Barker	4	4	15	14							43
13	(Luxembourg) Dylan Pereira	11	18	25	26	12	12	15	Ret	10	9	35
14	(Norway) Roar Lindland	19	16	18	25	9	17	12	11	13	18	34
15	(United Kingdom) Paul Rees	10	10	19	22	Ret	16	26†	Ret	7	Ret	28
16	(Germany) Patrick Eisemann	14	19	11	23	11	20	Ret	Ret	16	16	21
17	(Spain) Pepe Massot							11		12	19	15
18	(Norway) Dennis Olsen		11			6						10
19	(France) Thomas Laurent				16							7
20	(Netherlands) Jaap van Lagen						11					6
21	(Singapore) Sean Hudspeth								12			6
22	(Germany) Chris Bauer	15	20	20	24	Ret	Ret	18	Ret	18	20	6
23	(Denmark) Mikkel O. Pedersen	12	Ret				Ret					4
24	(Switzerland) Glauco Solieri	17	DNS	Ret		17	22	22	16	20	23	4
25	(Belgium) John Wartique					14		17	13			4
26	(Germany) Christof Langer	18	DNQ	23	27	18	Ret	23	18	19	25	2
27	(Mexico) Santiago Creel	Ret	22	24	28	16	21	25	20	22	24	2
28	(Spain) Víctor Jiménez	20										0
29	(Japan) Kenji Kobayashi						23	DNQ				0
20	(Argentina) Pablo Otero		DNQ							23	26	0
31	(Australia) Sam Power				Ret							0
Guest drivers ineligible for points
	(Austria) Klaus Bachler		2	8				7				0
	(Italy) Mattia Drudi			9			10		3			0
	(United Kingdom) Josh Webster				4							0
	(United Kingdom) Nick Yelloly				5							0
	(Italy) Daniele di Amato			17			19		6			0
	(United Kingdom) Tom Sharp				7							0
	(United States) Alec Udell									11	7	0
	(Netherlands) Larry ten Voorde							8				0
	(United Kingdom) Dan Cammish				9							0
	(Netherlands) Charlie Frijns							9				0
	(Republic of Ireland) Charlie Eastwood				10							0
	(United States) Will Hardeman									17	11	0
	(Germany) Wolfgang Triller			12								0
	(United Kingdom) Tom Oliphant				12							0
	(Singapore) Andrew Tang						13					0
	(Sweden) Henric Skoog							13				0
	(Austria) Felix Wimmer		Ret	14								0
	(Norway) Egidio Perfetti		15									0
	(United Kingdom) Dino Zamparelli				15							0
	(Sweden) Matte Karlsson					15						0
	(Italy) Alex de Giacomi			Ret					15			0
	(Mexico) Pablo Sánchez López		17						Ret	15	21	0
	(Argentina) Juan Pipkin									Ret	15	0
	(France) Roland Bervillé	16	Ret	22		Ret			17	21	22	0
	(Belgium) Pierre Piron							16				0
	(United Kingdom) Lewis Plato				17							0
	(Germany) Nico Rindlisbacher									Ret	17	0
	(China) Zhang Dasheng						18					0
	(Hungary) György Lekeny					19						0
	(Belgium) Jean Glorieux							19				0
	(Italy) Matteo Torta								19			0
	(Sweden) Pontus Fredricsson							20				0
	(Italy) Gianmarco Quaresmini			21					Ret			0
	(Sweden) Kenneth Pantzar							24				0
	(Netherlands) Wolf Nathan			26								0
	(United Kingdom) Mark Radcliffe				29							0
	(Sweden) Lucas Sundahl					Ret						0
	(Finland) Anssi-Jukka Kasi					DNQ						0
Pos.	Driver	CAT (Spain)	MON (Monaco)	RBR (Austria)	SIL (United Kingdom)	HUN (Hungary)	HOC (Germany)	SPA (Belgium)	MNZ (Italy)	COA (United States)		Points

Colour	Result
Gold	Winner
Silver	Second place
Bronze	Third place
Green	Points classification
Blue	Non-points classification
Blue	Non-classified finish (NC)
Purple	Retired, not classified (Ret)
Red	Did not qualify (DNQ)
Red	Did not pre-qualify (DNPQ)
Black	Disqualified (DSQ)
White	Did not start (DNS)
White	Withdrew (WD)
White	Race cancelled (C)
Blank	Did not practice (DNP)
Blank	Did not arrive (DNA)
Blank	Excluded (EX)

**Bold** – Pole
Italics – Fastest Lap

Notes

† – Drivers did not finish the race, but were classified as they completed over 75% of the race distance.

^ – Drivers took part in the races with different competiotionnumber
