= Josh Webster =

British auto racing driver (born 1994)

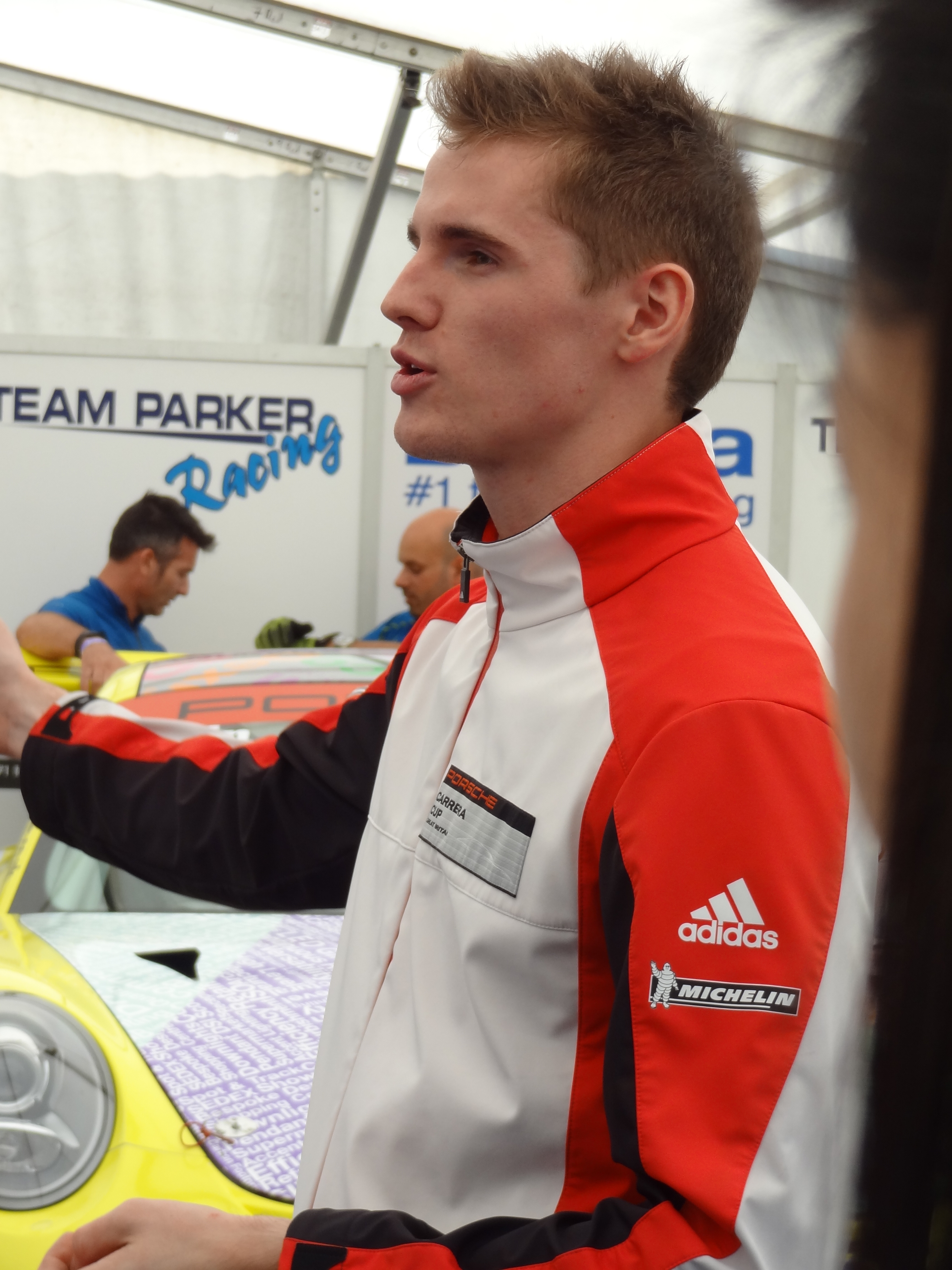
- Webster in 2015
- Nationality: (United Kingdom) British
- Born: 6 February 1994 (age 32) Chelmsford, England

Porsche Carrera Cup Great Britain career
- Debut season: 2014
- Current team: Team Parker Racing
- Categorisation: FIA Gold (2014); FIA Silver (2015–)
- Car number: 9
- Former teams: Redline Racing
- Starts: 57
- Wins: 10
- Poles: 8
- Fastest laps: 6
- Best finish: 1st in 2014

Previous series
- 2015 2014-2015 2013 2011-2012: Porsche Carrera Cup Germany; Porsche Supercup; GP3 Series; Formula Renault BARC

Championship titles
- 2014: Porsche Carrera Cup GB

Josh Webster (born 6 February 1994 in Chelmsford) is a British auto racing driver.

== Career ==
2013 saw Webster drive in the GP3 Series where he finished the season in 28th place scoring no points, with his best finish a pair of 16th places at his home race in Great Britain. For 2014, he would compete in Porsche Carrera Cup Great Britain.

== Racing Record ==
=== Career summary ===
| Season | Series | Team | Races | Wins | Poles | F/Laps | Podiums | Points | Position |
|---|---|---|---|---|---|---|---|---|---|
| 2010 | Formula Renault BARC | Fortec Motorsport | 12 | 0 | 0 | 1 | 4 | 251 | 4th |
| 2010 | Formula Renault UK Winter Series - BARC Class | Fortec Motorsport | 6 | 5 | 4 | 6 | 6 | 52 | **1st** |
| 2011 | Formula Renault BARC | Fortec Motorsport | 12 | 3 | 2 | 4 | 9 | 286 | **2nd** |
| 2011 | Formula Renault UK Finals Series | Mark Burdett Motorsport | 6 | 0 | 0 | 0 | 1 | 108 | 4th |
| 2012 | Formula Renault BARC | MGR Motorsport | 14 | 5 | 4 | 3 | 9 | 335 | **2nd** |
| 2012 | Masters of Formula 3 | T-Sport | 1 | 0 | 0 | 0 | 0 | N/A | 16th |
| 2013 | GP3 Series | Status Grand Prix | 16 | 0 | 0 | 0 | 0 | 0 | 28th |
| 2014 | Porsche Carrera Cup GB | Redline Racing | 19 | 5 | 3 | 4 | 17 | 357 | **1st** |
| 2014 | Porsche Supercup | Porsche Cars GB | 1 | 0 | 0 | 0 | 0 | 0 | NC† |
| 2015 | Porsche Carrera Cup GB | Team Parker Racing | 16 | 1 | 3 | 0 | 8 | 203 | **3rd** |
| 2015 | Porsche Supercup | Team Parker Racing | 1 | 0 | 0 | 0 | 0 | 0 | NC† |
| 2015 | Porsche Carrera Cup Germany | KÜS Team 75 Bernhard | 2 | 0 | 0 | 0 | 0 | 8 | 24th |
| 2016 | Renault Sport Trophy - Pro Class | V8 Racing | 3 | 0 | 0 | 0 | 0 | 34 | 11th |
| 2016 | Renault Sport Endurance Trophy | V8 Racing | 2 | 0 | 0 | 0 | 0 | 12 | 21st |
| 2016 | International GT Open | V8 Racing | 2 | 1 | 0 | 0 | 2 | 40 | 14th |
| 2016 | International GT Open - Pro Am | V8 Racing | 2 | 1 | 0 | 0 | 2 | 18 | 13th |
| 2016 | IMSA SportsCar Championship - GTD | Konrad Motorsport | 1 | 0 | 0 | 0 | 0 | 18 | 56th |
| 2016 | Porsche Supercup | Rookie Team Deutsche Post by Project 1 | 1 | 0 | 0 | 0 | 0 | 0 | NC† |
| 2017 | Porsche Supercup | Fach Auto Tech | 11 | 0 | 0 | 0 | 0 | 85 | 7th |
| 2017 | Porsche Carrera Cup Germany | Fach Auto Tech | 2 | 0 | 0 | 0 | 0 | 0 | NC† |
| 2017 | Porsche GT3 Cup Challenge Central Europe | Fach Auto Tech | 2 | 1 | 0 | 1 | 1 | 0 | NC† |
| 2017 | Porsche Carrera Cup Japan | 911 Service | 2 | 1 | 0 | 0 | 1 | 0 | NC† |
| 2017 | 24H Series - A6 | GP Extreme | | | | | | | |
| 2018 | Porsche Supercup | Momo Megatron Lechner Racing Team | 10 | 0 | 0 | 0 | 0 | 39 | 12th |
| 2019 | Porsche Carrera Cup GB | Team Parker Racing | 14 | 3 | 2 | 2 | 9 | 114 | **2nd** |
| 2019 | Porsche Supercup | Team Project 1 - FACH | 1 | 0 | 0 | 0 | 0 | 1 | 26th |
| 2019 | 24H GT Series - GT4 | Dragon Racing | | | | | | | |
| 2020 | Porsche Carrera Cup GB | Team Parker Racing | 16 | 1 | 0 | 2 | 11 | 121 | **2nd** |

^{†} As Webster was a guest driver, he was ineligible to score points. ^{*} Season still in progress.

=== Complete GP3 Series results ===
(key) (Races in bold indicate pole position) (Races in italics indicate fastest lap)

| Year | Entrant | 1 | 2 | 3 | 4 | 5 | 6 | 7 | 8 | 9 | 10 | 11 | 12 | 13 | 14 | 15 | 16 | D.C. | Points |
|---|---|---|---|---|---|---|---|---|---|---|---|---|---|---|---|---|---|---|---|
| 2013 | Status Grand Prix | CAT; FEA; Ret | CAT; SPR; Ret | VAL; FEA; 17 | VAL; SPR; 18 | SIL; FEA; 16 | SIL; SPR; 16 | HOC; FEA; Ret | NÜR; SPR; Ret | HUN; FEA; 21 | HUN; SPR; DSQ | SPA; FEA; Ret | SPA; SPR; 18 | MNZ; FEA; Ret | MNZ; SPR; 16 | YMC; FEA; 21 | YMC; SPR; 22 | 28th | 0 |

=== Complete Porsche Supercup results ===
(key) (Races in bold indicate pole position) (Races in italics indicate fastest lap)

| Year | Team | 1 | 2 | 3 | 4 | 5 | 6 | 7 | 8 | 9 | 10 | 11 | DC | Points |
|---|---|---|---|---|---|---|---|---|---|---|---|---|---|---|
| 2014 | Porsche Cars GB | CAT | MON | RBR | SIL; 18 | NÜR | HUN | SPA | MNZ | COA | COA | | NC‡ | 0‡ |
| 2015 | Team Parker Racing | CAT | MON | RBR | SIL; 17 | HUN | SPA | MNZ | COA | COA | | | NC‡ | 0‡ |
| 2016 | Rookie Team Deutsche Post by Project 1 | CAT | MON | RBR | SIL; 4 | HUN | HOC | SPA | MNZ | COA | COA | | NC‡ | 0‡ |
| 2017 | Fach Auto Tech | CAT; 6 | CAT; 19 | MON; 8 | RBR; 6 | SIL; 5 | HUN; 15 | SPA; 9 | SPA; 9 | MNZ; 11 | MEX; 7 | MEX; 4 | 7th | 85 |
| 2018 | Momo Megatron Lechner Racing Team | CAT; 9 | MON; 8 | RBR; 15 | SIL; 9 | HOC; 19 | HUN; 13 | SPA; 12 | MNZ; 25† | MEX; Ret | MEX; 11 | | 12th | 39 |
| 2019 | Team Project 1 - FACH | CAT | MON | RBR | SIL; 18 | HOC | HUN | SPA | MNZ | MEX | MEX | | 26th | 1 |

^{†} Driver did not finish the race, but was classified as he completed over 90% of the race distance.
^{‡} As Webster was a guest driver, he was ineligible to score points.

Sporting positions
| Preceded by James Theodore (2008) | Formula Renault BARC Winter Series; Champion; 2010 | Succeeded by Victor Jiminez |
| Preceded by Michael Meadows | Porsche Carrera Cup GB; Champion; 2014 | Succeeded by Dan Cammish |
