= 2014 Porsche Carrera Cup Great Britain =

The 2014 Porsche Carrera Cup Great Britain was a multi-event, one make motor racing championship held across England, France and Scotland. The championship featured a mix of professional motor racing teams and privately funded drivers, competing in Porsche 911 GT3 cars that conformed to the technical regulations for the championship. It was a multi class championship, with drivers grouped based on their ability and experience into three classes: Professional, Professional-Amateur 1 (Pro-Am 1) and Professional-Amateur 2 (Pro-Am 2). It formed part of the extensive program of support categories built up around the BTCC centrepiece. The 2014 season was the twelfth Porsche Carrera Cup Great Britain season, commencing on 30 March at Brands Hatch – on the circuit's Indy configuration – and concluded on 12 October at the same venue, utilising the Grand Prix circuit, after 19 races at 10 meetings. 18 of the races were held in support of the 2014 British Touring Car Championship season, with the other race in support of the 2014 24 Hours of Le Mans.

For the majority of the season, the championship battle revolved around Redline Racing team-mates Josh Webster and Michael Meadows, running under the Samsung UHD TV Racing banner. Meadows won more races than Webster – Meadows with nine overall wins plus a further two class wins, while Webster took five overall wins with a further class win – but Webster's greater consistency allowed him to take the overall championship by nine points, ahead of the two-time defending champion Meadows. Webster finished each race as one of the best three finishers in class, including the overseas round at Le Mans, where he was seventh overall. Third place in the championship went to Paul Rees, who took a race victory at Rockingham, and three further podium finishes. The only other drivers to take race victories were Ben Barker, who achieved an overall victory at Le Mans – as well as two victories in the guest car in the opening Brands Hatch round – and Daniel Cammish, who took a win in the guest car at the final round. Redline Racing were comfortable winners of the teams' championship, finishing almost 200 points clear of In2Racing, the next best team.

In the Pro-Am championships, Justin Sherwood won the Pro-Am 1 title by 41 points, largely due to him competing in more rounds of the series than any other driver in the class. Only twice did a Pro-Am 1 driver reach the overall podium, as Karl Leonard achieved a second-place finish at Donington Park, while Pepe Massot took a third-place finish at Croft. Massot was later regraded as a professional driver after his strong performances at Croft, and in qualifying at Snetterton. In Pro-Am 2, although Peter Kyle-Henney scored more championship points in total, the best seven rounds scoring system allowed Steven Liquorish to claim the championship title by a single point. Liquorish took six race wins over the course of the season, while Kyle-Henney took four wins. Third place went to three-time winner Will Goff, with two wins each for Carol Brown at Knockhill, Paul Donkin at Croft, and Emmerdale actor Kelvin Fletcher, who achieved his double at Silverstone.

== Entry list ==
For the 2014 season, a new car was utilised with the introduction of the seventh generation Porsche 911 – the Porsche 991 – to replace the Porsche 997 model.

Team	No.	Driver	Rounds
Redline Racing	1	(United Kingdom) Michael Meadows	All
Redline Racing	9	(United Kingdom) Josh Webster	All
Redline Racing	18	(Canada) Nicholas Latifi	8
Redline Racing	25	(Spain) Víctor Jiménez	All
Parr Motorsport	14	(Spain) Pepe Massot	6–10
Parr Motorsport	130	(United Kingdom) Ben Barker	4
In2Racing	24	(United Kingdom) Jake Hill	1, 10
In2Racing	77	(United Kingdom) Paul Rees	All
Welch Motorsport	55	(United Kingdom) James Fletcher	9
Welch Motorsport	70	(United Kingdom) Mark Cole	3
Pro-Am 1
Team Parker Racing	7	(United Kingdom) Justin Sherwood	1–3, 5–10
Team Parker Racing	36	(Republic of Ireland) Karl Leonard	1–2, 4
Redline Racing	13	(United Kingdom) Jordan Witt	6–10
Redline Racing	99	(United Kingdom) Rob Smith	2, 4, 6–7, 10
Parr Motorsport	14	(Spain) Pepe Massot	5
Parr Motorsport	23	(United Kingdom) Kieran Gallagher	1
In2Racing	42	(United Kingdom) Graeme Mundy	2–4
In2Racing	49	(United Kingdom) Michael Donovan	9
Welch Motorsport	44	(United Kingdom) George Brewster	10
Pro-Am 2
Redline Racing	15	(United Kingdom) Paul Donkin	5
Redline Racing	17	(United Kingdom) Kelvin Fletcher	1, 9
Team Parker Racing	17	(United Kingdom) Kelvin Fletcher	3
Team Parker Racing	66	(United Kingdom) Steven Liquorish	All
Team Parker Racing	123	(United Kingdom) Bill Cameron	4
Parr Motorsport	22	(United Kingdom) Peter Kyle-Henney	All
In2Racing	50	(United Kingdom) Paul McKay	5–6
In2Racing	59	(United Kingdom) Will Goff	1–2, 8, 10
In2Racing	91	(United Kingdom) Daniel McKay	8
In2Racing	92	(United Kingdom) Carol Brown	7
Welch Motorsport	111	(United Kingdom) Scott Marshall	4
Guest
Parr Motorsport	0	(United Kingdom) Ben Barker	1
Parr Motorsport	0	(United Kingdom) Max Coates	2
Parr Motorsport	0	(United Kingdom) Oscar King	3
Redline Racing	0	(United Kingdom) Chris Harris	4
Redline Racing	0	(United Kingdom) Ollie Millroy	5
Redline Racing	0	(Australia) Richard Muscat	6
In2Racing	0	(United Kingdom) William Plant	7
In2Racing	0	(United Kingdom) David Walley	8
In2Racing	0	(United Kingdom) Josh Files	9
Team Parker Racing	0	(United Kingdom) Dan Cammish	10
Redline Racing	116	(United Kingdom) Guy Riall	4
ASK Racing	117	(United Kingdom) Tom Hallissey	4
Parr Motorsport	195	(United Kingdom) Pete Smallwood	4

Icon	Class
PA1	Pro-Am 1
PA2	Pro-Am 2
G	Guest

== Race calendar and results ==
The calendar was announced by the championship organisers on 23 September 2013. The championship reduced from 20 rounds in 2013 to 19 rounds, after the inclusion of a single joint race, with the Porsche Carrera Cup France, in support of the 2014 24 Hours of Le Mans, replacing the races at Oulton Park. The French round was only the second time the championship has held an international round, after the 2011 race in Germany. All other rounds were held in support of the 2014 British Touring Car Championship season and featured two races at each meeting.

Round		Circuit	Date	Pole position	Fastest lap	Winning driver	Winning team
1	R1	Brands Hatch (Indy Circuit, Kent)	30 March	(United Kingdom) Michael Meadows	(United Kingdom) Ben Barker	(United Kingdom) Ben Barker	Parr Motorsport
1	R2	Brands Hatch (Indy Circuit, Kent)	30 March	(United Kingdom) Michael Meadows	(United Kingdom) Michael Meadows	(United Kingdom) Ben Barker	Parr Motorsport
2	R3	Donington Park (National Circuit, Leicestershire)	19 April	(United Kingdom) Michael Meadows	(United Kingdom) Josh Webster	(United Kingdom) Michael Meadows	Samsung UHD TV Racing
2	R4	Donington Park (National Circuit, Leicestershire)	20 April	(United Kingdom) Michael Meadows	(United Kingdom) Michael Meadows	(United Kingdom) Josh Webster	Redline Racing
3	R5	Thruxton Circuit (Hampshire)	4 May	(United Kingdom) Michael Meadows	(United Kingdom) Michael Meadows	(United Kingdom) Michael Meadows	Samsung UHD TV Racing
3	R6	Thruxton Circuit (Hampshire)	4 May	(United Kingdom) Michael Meadows	(United Kingdom) Michael Meadows	(United Kingdom) Michael Meadows	Samsung UHD TV Racing
4	R7	Circuit de la Sarthe (Le Mans)	13 June	(France) Kévin Estre	(France) Kévin Estre	(United Kingdom) Ben Barker	Parr Motorsport
5	R8	Croft Circuit (North Yorkshire)	28 June	(United Kingdom) Paul Rees	(United Kingdom) Josh Webster	(United Kingdom) Josh Webster	Redline Racing
5	R9	Croft Circuit (North Yorkshire)	29 June	(United Kingdom) Josh Webster	(United Kingdom) Michael Meadows	(United Kingdom) Josh Webster	Redline Racing
6	R10	Snetterton Motor Racing Circuit (300 Circuit, Norfolk)	3 August	(United Kingdom) Josh Webster	(United Kingdom) Josh Webster	(United Kingdom) Josh Webster	Redline Racing
6	R11	Snetterton Motor Racing Circuit (300 Circuit, Norfolk)	3 August	(United Kingdom) Josh Webster	(United Kingdom) Michael Meadows	(United Kingdom) Josh Webster	Redline Racing
7	R12	Knockhill Racing Circuit (Fife)	24 August	(United Kingdom) Michael Meadows	(United Kingdom) Michael Meadows	(United Kingdom) Michael Meadows	Samsung UHD TV Racing
7	R13	Knockhill Racing Circuit (Fife)	24 August	(United Kingdom) Michael Meadows	(United Kingdom) Michael Meadows	(United Kingdom) Michael Meadows	Samsung UHD TV Racing
8	R14	Rockingham Motor Speedway (International Super Sports Car Circuit, Northamptonshire)	6 September	(United Kingdom) Michael Meadows	(United Kingdom) Michael Meadows	(United Kingdom) Michael Meadows	Samsung UHD TV Racing
8	R15	Rockingham Motor Speedway (International Super Sports Car Circuit, Northamptonshire)	7 September	(United Kingdom) Michael Meadows	(United Kingdom) Michael Meadows	(United Kingdom) Paul Rees	In2Racing
9	R16	Silverstone Circuit (National Circuit, Northamptonshire)	27 September	(United Kingdom) Michael Meadows	(United Kingdom) Michael Meadows	(United Kingdom) Michael Meadows	Samsung UHD TV Racing
9	R17	Silverstone Circuit (National Circuit, Northamptonshire)	28 September	(United Kingdom) Michael Meadows	(United Kingdom) Michael Meadows	(United Kingdom) Michael Meadows	Samsung UHD TV Racing
10	R18	Brands Hatch (Grand Prix Circuit, Kent)	12 October	(United Kingdom) Dan Cammish	(United Kingdom) Josh Webster	(United Kingdom) Dan Cammish	Team Parker Racing
10	R19	Brands Hatch (Grand Prix Circuit, Kent)	12 October	(United Kingdom) Dan Cammish	(United Kingdom) Dan Cammish	(United Kingdom) Michael Meadows	Samsung UHD TV Racing

== Championship standings ==
Points system
	1st	2nd	3rd	4th	5th	6th	7th	8th	9th	10th	11th	12th	13th	14th	15th	PP	FL
Finishers	20	18	16	14	12	10	9	8	7	6	5	4	3	2	1	1	1
Pro-AM2	10	9	8	7	6	5	4	3	2	1						1	1

=== Drivers' championships ===
==== Overall championship ====
Pos	Driver	BHI		DON		THR		SAR	CRO		SNE		KNO		ROC		SIL		BHGP		Pts
1	(United Kingdom) Josh Webster	3	4	3	1	2	2	2	1	1	1	1	2	2	2	2	2	3	2	2	357
2	(United Kingdom) Michael Meadows	2	2	1	6	1	1	3	DNS	2	2	2	1	1	1	11	1	1	4	1	348
3	(United Kingdom) Paul Rees	7	6	5	3	5	5	4	2	4	5	6	6	7	8	1	4	2	6	10	250
4	(Spain) Víctor Jiménez	5	5	4	2	4	3	14†	3	Ret	4	4	3	6	3	Ret	3	10	3	4	242
5	(Spain) Pepe Massot								4	3	6	5	4	3	4	3	Ret	Ret	5	9	135
6	(United Kingdom) Justin Sherwood	8	7	7	10	DNS	DNS		Ret	5	11	8	12	9	5	9	9	8	11	8	128
7	(United Kingdom) Peter Kyle-Henney	10	10	9	9	8	9	Ret	7	8	8	11	10	11	9	10	11	11	13	12	127
8	(United Kingdom) Steven Liquorish	9	9	11	8	9	8	8	Ret	7	9	10	11	12	10	8	Ret	9	14	11	121
9	(United Kingdom) Rob Smith			8	7			6			7	7	7	5					9	7	88
10	(United Kingdom) Jordan Witt										Ret	9	5	4	6	Ret	7	7	7	Ret	65
11	(United Kingdom) Jake Hill	4	3																8	3	59
12	(Republic of Ireland) Karl Leonard	6	Ret	2	4			5													56
13	(United Kingdom) Kelvin Fletcher	12	11			10	10										8	6			46
14	(United Kingdom) Will Goff	13	8	Ret	12										11	6			12	13	45
15	(United Kingdom) Graeme Mundy			10	11	7	7	7													42
16	(United Kingdom) James Fletcher																6	5			26
17	(United Kingdom) Mark Cole					6	6														24
18	(United Kingdom) Paul McKay								8	9	10	Ret									23
19	(United Kingdom) Ben Barker	1	1					1													22
20	(United Kingdom) Paul Donkin								6	6											22
21	(United Kingdom) George Brewster																		10	6	20
22	(United Kingdom) Daniel McKay														12	7					15
23	(United Kingdom) Carol Brown												9	10							15
24	(Canada) Nicholas Latifi														Ret	4					14
25	(United Kingdom) Michael Donovan																10	12			12
26	(United Kingdom) Kieran Gallagher	11	12																		11
27	(United Kingdom) Scott Marshall							9													7
28	(United Kingdom) Bill Cameron							12													6
Guest drivers ineligible for points
	(United Kingdom) Dan Cammish																		1	5	0
	(Australia) Richard Muscat										3	3									0
	(United Kingdom) Oscar King					3	4														0
	(United Kingdom) Josh Files																5	4			0
	(United Kingdom) Max Coates			6	5																0
	(United Kingdom) David Walley														7	5					0
	(United Kingdom) Ollie Millroy								5	Ret											0
	(United Kingdom) William Plant												8	8							0
	(United Kingdom) Pete Smallwood							10													0
	(United Kingdom) Guy Riall							11													0
	(United Kingdom) Tom Hallissey							13													0
	(United Kingdom) Chris Harris							Ret													0
Pos	Driver	BHI		DON		THR		SAR	CRO		SNE		KNO		ROC		SIL		BHGP		Pts

Colour	Result
Gold	Winner
Silver	Second place
Bronze	Third place
Green	Points classification
Blue	Non-points classification
Blue	Non-classified finish (NC)
Purple	Retired, not classified (Ret)
Red	Did not qualify (DNQ)
Red	Did not pre-qualify (DNPQ)
Black	Disqualified (DSQ)
White	Did not start (DNS)
White	Withdrew (WD)
White	Race cancelled (C)
Blank	Did not practice (DNP)
Blank	Did not arrive (DNA)
Blank	Excluded (EX)

Notes

† — At Le Mans, Víctor Jiménez did not finish the race but was classified for completing over 90% of the race distance.

==== Pro-Am championships ====
Pos	Driver	BHI		DON		THR		SAR	CRO		SNE		KNO		ROC		SIL		BHGP		Pts
Pro-Am 1
1	(United Kingdom) Justin Sherwood	8	7	7	10	DNS	DNS		Ret	5	11	8	12	9	5	9	9	8	11	8	132
2	(United Kingdom) Rob Smith			8	7			22			7	7	7	5					9	7	91
3	(United Kingdom) Jordan Witt										Ret	9	5	4	6	Ret	7	7	7	Ret	76
4	(Republic of Ireland) Karl Leonard	6	Ret	2	4			15													65
5	(United Kingdom) Graeme Mundy			10	11	7	7	24													46
6	(Spain) Pepe Massot								4	3	P^{1}	P^{1}									33
7	(United Kingdom) George Brewster																		10	6	20
8	(United Kingdom) Michael Donovan																10	12			12
9	(United Kingdom) Kieran Gallagher	11	12																		11
Pro-Am 2
1	(United Kingdom) Steven Liquorish	9	9	11	8	9	8	27	Ret	7	9	10	11	12	10	8	Ret	9	14	11	132
2	(United Kingdom) Peter Kyle-Henney	10	10	9	9	8	9	Ret	7	8	8	11	10	11	9	10	11	11	13	12	131
3	(United Kingdom) Will Goff	13	8	Ret	12										11	6			12	13	68
4	(United Kingdom) Kelvin Fletcher	12	11			10	10										8	6			54
5	(United Kingdom) Paul Donkin								6	6											24
6	(United Kingdom) Carol Brown												9	10							24
7	(United Kingdom) Paul McKay								8	9	10	Ret									23
8	(United Kingdom) Daniel McKay														12	7					18
9	(United Kingdom) Scott Marshall							31													9
10	(United Kingdom) Bill Cameron							46													8
Pos	Driver	BHI		DON		THR		SAR	CRO		SNE		KNO		ROC		SIL		BHGP		Pts

Colour	Result
Gold	Winner
Silver	Second place
Bronze	Third place
Green	Points classification
Blue	Non-points classification
Blue	Non-classified finish (NC)
Purple	Retired, not classified (Ret)
Red	Did not qualify (DNQ)
Red	Did not pre-qualify (DNPQ)
Black	Disqualified (DSQ)
White	Did not start (DNS)
White	Withdrew (WD)
White	Race cancelled (C)
Blank	Did not practice (DNP)
Blank	Did not arrive (DNA)
Blank	Excluded (EX)

Notes

^{1} — Pepe Massot scored pole position points towards the Pro-Am 1 championship standings at Snetterton, before being regraded as a professional driver for the races.
