= 2015 Porsche Carrera Cup Germany =

Motor racing competition

The 2015 Porsche Carrera Cup Deutschland season was the 30th German Porsche Carrera Cup season. It began on 3 May at Hockenheim and finished on 18 October at the same circuit, after eighteen races, with two races at each event. It was a support championship for the 2015 Deutsche Tourenwagen Masters.

== Teams and drivers ==
Team	No.	Drivers	Class	Rounds
(Germany) Deutsche Post by Project 1	1	(Italy) Matteo Cairoli	A	All
(Germany) Deutsche Post by Project 1	93	(Austria) Philipp Eng	A	All
(Germany) Market Leader Team by Project 1	2	(United States) Sean Johnston	A	1–6
(Germany) Market Leader Team by Project 1	3	(Spain) Alexander Toril	A	All
(Germany) Herberth Motorsport	4	(Germany) Robert Renauer	A	All
(Germany) Herberth Motorsport	5	(Germany) Ralf Bohn	B	All
(Austria) Lechner Racing Middle East	6	(Switzerland) Jeffrey Schmidt	A	All
(Austria) Lechner Racing Middle East	24	(Sweden) Philip Morin	G A	9
(Austria) Lechner Racing Middle East	92	(Netherlands) Jaap van Lagen	A	1, 3
(Austria) Lechner Racing Middle East	92	(Germany) Sven Müller	A	2, 4–9
(Austria) The Heart of Racing by Lechner	7	(Germany) Michael Ammermüller	A	All
(Austria) The Heart of Racing by Lechner	23	(Spain) Alex Riberas	A	All
(Germany) Land Motorsport	8	(United States) Connor De Phillippi	A	All
(Germany) Land Motorsport	9	(Netherlands) Wolf Nathan	B	All
(Germany) Land Motorsport	89	(United Kingdom) Ben Barker	A	All
(Germany) Land Motorsport	90	(New Zealand) Peter Scharmach	G	2
(Germany) Land Motorsport	90	(Germany) Hermann Speck	G	4
(Germany) Konrad Motorsport	10	(Austria) Christopher Zöchling	A	All
(Germany) Konrad Motorsport	11	(Switzerland) Philipp Frommenwiler	A	1, 7
(Germany) Konrad Motorsport	11	(Austria) Klaus Bachler	A	2
(Germany) Konrad Motorsport	11	(United Kingdom) Daniel Cammish	A	3, 5
(Germany) Konrad Motorsport	11	(Netherlands) Ronald van de Laar	B	4
(Germany) Konrad Motorsport	11	(Austria) Luca Rettenbacher	A	6
(Germany) Konrad Motorsport	11	(Germany) Klaus Abbelen	B	8
(Germany) Konrad Motorsport	12	(Switzerland) Rolf Ineichen	B	All
(Germany) TECE MRS-Racing	14	(Germany) Christian Engelhart	A	All
(Germany) TECE MRS-Racing	15	(Australia) Richard Goddard	A	All
(Germany) TECE MRS-Racing	16	(Germany) Elia Erhart	A	All
(Germany) KÜS Team 75 Bernhard	17	(Denmark) Nicki Thiim	A	All
(Germany) KÜS Team 75 Bernhard	18	(Spain) Pepe Massot	A	1–5, 9
(Germany) KÜS Team 75 Bernhard	18	(United Kingdom) Josh Webster	A	6
(Germany) KÜS Team 75 Bernhard	18	(Netherlands) Jaap van Lagen	A	7
(Germany) KÜS Team 75 Bernhard	18	(New Zealand) Chris van der Drift	A	8
(Germany) Aust Motorsport	19	(Germany) Maximilian Hackl	A	1–7
(Germany) Aust Motorsport	19	(Germany) Lance David Arnold	A	8–9
(Germany) Aust Motorsport	20	(Germany) Mike Halder	A	1–4
(Germany) Aust Motorsport	20	(Germany) Niclas Kentenich	A	5–8
(Germany) Aust Motorsport	20	(Netherlands) Jaap van Lagen	A	9
(Sweden) Mtech Competition	25	(Sweden) Magnus Öhman	G B	9
(Sweden) Mtech Competition	26	(Sweden) Lars Bertil Rantzow	G B	9
(Sweden) Fragus BR Motorsport	27	(Sweden) Robin Hansson	G A	9
(Italy) Dinamic Motorsport	31	(Italy) Mattia Drudi	G	6

Icon	Class
A	A-class
B	B-class
G	Guest

== Race calendar and results ==
Round		Circuit	Date	Pole position	Fastest lap	Winning driver	Winning team	B-class winner
1	R1	(Germany) Hockenheimring, Baden-Württemberg	2 May	(Germany) Christian Engelhart	(Germany) Christian Engelhart	(Germany) Christian Engelhart	(Germany) TECE MRS-Racing	(Switzerland) Rolf Ineichen
1	R2	(Germany) Hockenheimring, Baden-Württemberg	3 May	(Germany) Christian Engelhart	(Germany) Christian Engelhart	(Germany) Christian Engelhart	(Germany) TECE MRS-Racing	(Netherlands) Wolf Nathan
2		(Germany) Nürburgring (Nordschleife), Rhineland-Palatinate	16 May	(Germany) Sven Müller	(Spain) Alex Riberas	(Germany) Sven Müller	(Austria) Lechner Racing Middle East	(Switzerland) Rolf Ineichen
3	R1	(Germany) Lausitzring, Brandenburg	30 May	(Austria) Philipp Eng	(Germany) Robert Renauer	(Austria) Philipp Eng	(Germany) Deutsche Post by Project 1	(Switzerland) Rolf Ineichen
3	R2	(Germany) Lausitzring, Brandenburg	31 May	(Austria) Philipp Eng	(Denmark) Nicki Thiim	(Austria) Philipp Eng	(Germany) Deutsche Post by Project 1	(Switzerland) Rolf Ineichen
4	R1	(Germany) Norisring, Nuremberg	27 June	(Denmark) Nicki Thiim	(Austria) Philipp Eng	(Denmark) Nicki Thiim	(Germany) Team 75 Bernhard	(Switzerland) Rolf Ineichen
4	R2	(Germany) Norisring, Nuremberg	28 June	(Denmark) Nicki Thiim	(Germany) Sven Müller	(Denmark) Nicki Thiim	(Germany) Team 75 Bernhard	(Switzerland) Rolf Ineichen
5	R1	(Netherlands) Circuit Park Zandvoort, North Holland	11 July	(Austria) Philipp Eng	(Austria) Philipp Eng	(Austria) Philipp Eng	(Germany) Deutsche Post by Project 1	(Switzerland) Rolf Ineichen
5	R2	(Netherlands) Circuit Park Zandvoort, North Holland	12 July	(Austria) Philipp Eng	(Austria) Philipp Eng	(Austria) Philipp Eng	(Germany) Deutsche Post by Project 1	(Switzerland) Rolf Ineichen
6	R1	(Austria) Red Bull Ring, Spielberg	1 August	(Austria) Philipp Eng	(Austria) Philipp Eng	(Austria) Philipp Eng	(Germany) Deutsche Post by Project 1	(Switzerland) Rolf Ineichen
6	R2	(Austria) Red Bull Ring, Spielberg	2 August	(Austria) Philipp Eng	(Italy) Matteo Cairoli	(Switzerland) Jeffrey Schmidt	(Austria) Lechner Racing Middle East	(Netherlands) Wolf Nathan
7	R1	(Germany) Motorsport Arena Oschersleben, Saxony-Anhalt	12 September	(Austria) Philipp Eng	(Germany) Sven Müller	(Austria) Philipp Eng	(Germany) Deutsche Post by Project 1	(Switzerland) Rolf Ineichen
7	R2	(Germany) Motorsport Arena Oschersleben, Saxony-Anhalt	13 September	(Austria) Philipp Eng	(Germany) Sven Müller	(Austria) Philipp Eng	(Germany) Deutsche Post by Project 1	(Switzerland) Rolf Ineichen
8	R1	(Germany) Nürburgring, Rhineland-Palatinate	26 September	(Austria) Philipp Eng	(Spain) Alex Riberas	(Austria) Philipp Eng	(Germany) Deutsche Post by Project 1	(Switzerland) Rolf Ineichen
8	R2	(Germany) Nürburgring, Rhineland-Palatinate	27 September	(Austria) Philipp Eng	(Denmark) Nicki Thiim	(Germany) Sven Müller	(Austria) Lechner Racing Middle East	(Switzerland) Rolf Ineichen
9	R1	(Germany) Hockenheimring, Baden-Württemberg	17 October	(Switzerland) Jeffrey Schmidt	(Germany) Christian Engelhart	(Switzerland) Jeffrey Schmidt	(Austria) Lechner Racing Middle East	(Switzerland) Rolf Ineichen
9	R2	(Germany) Hockenheimring, Baden-Württemberg	18 October	(Switzerland) Jeffrey Schmidt	(Denmark) Nicki Thiim	(Austria) Philipp Eng	(Germany) Deutsche Post by Project 1	(Germany) Ralf Bohn

== Championship standings ==
Points system
**1st**	**2nd**	**3rd**	**4th**	**5th**	**6th**	**7th**	**8th**	**9th**	**10th**	**11th**	**12th**	**13th**	**14th**	**15th**
20	18	16	14	12	10	9	8	7	6	5	4	3	2	1

=== A-class ===
Pos	Driver	HOC (Germany)		NNS (Germany)	LAU (Germany)		NOR (Germany)		ZAN (Netherlands)		RBR (Austria)		OSC (Germany)		NÜR (Germany)		HOC (Germany)		Pts
1	(Austria) Philipp Eng	5	6	2	**1**	**1**	2	3	**1**	**1**	**1**	**3**	**1**	**1**	**1**	**2**	9	1	295
2	(Germany) Christian Engelhart	**1**	**1**	Ret	11	5	4	4	5	5	3	Ret	Ret	2	4	4	3	5	199
3	(Switzerland) Jeffrey Schmidt	4	2	6	6	4	5	5	11	10	4	1	Ret	10	6	8	**1**	**2**	197
4	(Germany) Michael Ammermüller	DSQ	7	4	2	3	7	7	2	4	Ret	10	Ret	5	3	3	8	3	182
5	(Denmark) Nicki Thiim	Ret	11	8	3	7	**1**	**1**	Ret	3	12	Ret	7	3	7	5	6	4	169
6	(Spain) Alex Riberas	2	8	5	4	6	6	10	3	2	Ret	Ret	Ret	4	5	7	18	8	155
7	(Germany) Sven Müller			**1**			8	2	6	9	Ret	Ret	2	6	2	1	7	10	144
8	(Germany) Robert Renauer	7	12	13	5	2	9	12	8	8	2	6	3	Ret	13	10	5	Ret	138
9	(Austria) Christopher Zöchling	6	9	3	8	10	14	8	9	7	Ret	11	15	7	8	6	2	7	136
10	(United States) Connor De Phillippi	9	5	11	9	11	3	9	4	11	11	5	9	17	10	14	17	6	124
11	(United Kingdom) Ben Barker	3	3	9	Ret	8	Ret	Ret	13	12	6	8	4	9	12	Ret	4	9	122
12	(Italy) Matteo Cairoli	10	4	7	13	Ret	DSQ	6	7	6	19	9	5	8	9	9	11	17	110
13	(Spain) Alexander Toril	Ret	13	16	17	Ret	Ret	21	15	Ret	7	2	12	12	14	11	13	11	58
14	(Germany) Elia Erhart	18	16	18	15	17	10	15	14	17	9	4	10	18	18	15	Ret	16	46
15	(Netherlands) Jaap van Lagen	12	20		7	9							6	11			10	12	45
16	(United States) Sean Johnston	11	15	10	14	14	11	11	10	13	18	Ret							37
17	(New Zealand) Richard Goddard	16	17	12	18	Ret	12	17	16	15	8	Ret	Ret	15	17	Ret	16	13	27
18	(Germany) Mike Halder	15	10	15	10	13	21†	13											21
19	(Germany) Niclas Kentenich								18	14	13	13	11	14	15	18			21
20	(Switzerland) Philipp Frommenwiler	8	14										13	16					15
21	(Austria) Luca Rettenbacher										10	17†					14	Ret	12
22	(New Zealand) Chris van der Drift														11	13			9
23	(United Kingdom) Daniel Cammish				12	12			Ret	19									8
24	(United Kingdom) Josh Webster										15	12							8
25	(Spain) Pepe Massot	14	18	19	19	18	13	16	DNS	DNS							DNS	DNS	7
26	(Germany) Maximilian Hackl	DNS	DNS	21	21	20	18	22	20	20	20	15	17	20					6
27	(Austria) Klaus Bachler			14															2
28	(Germany) Lance David Arnold														16	Ret			0
Guest drivers ineligible for series points
	(Italy) Mattia Drudi										5	7							
	(Sweden) Robin Hansson																12	14	
	(Sweden) Philip Morin																20	15	
	(Sweden) Magnus Öhman																23	21	
	(Australia) Peter Scharmach			DNS															
Pos	Driver	HOC (Germany)		NNS (Germany)	LAU (Germany)		NOR (Germany)		ZAN (Netherlands)		RBR (Austria)		OSC (Germany)		NÜR (Germany)		HOC (Germany)		Pts

Colour	Result
Gold	Winner
Silver	Second place
Bronze	Third place
Green	Points classification
Blue	Non-points classification
Blue	Non-classified finish (NC)
Purple	Retired, not classified (Ret)
Red	Did not qualify (DNQ)
Red	Did not pre-qualify (DNPQ)
Black	Disqualified (DSQ)
White	Did not start (DNS)
White	Withdrew (WD)
White	Race cancelled (C)
Blank	Did not practice (DNP)
Blank	Did not arrive (DNA)
Blank	Excluded (EX)

**Bold** – Pole
Italics – Fastest Lap

† — Drivers did not finish the race, but were classified as they completed over 90% of the race distance.

=== B-class ===
Pos	Driver	HOC (Germany)		NNS (Germany)	LAU (Germany)		NOR (Germany)		ZAN (Netherlands)		RBR (Austria)		OSC (Germany)		NÜR (Germany)		HOC (Germany)		Pts
1	(Switzerland) Rolf Ineichen	**13**	**Ret**	17	**16**	**15**	**15**	14	**12**	**16**	**14**	**18**	**8**	**13**	**19**	**12**	**15**	**Ret**	296
2	(Netherlands) Wolf Nathan	19	19	20	22	19	16	**18**	19	18	17	14	16	19	22	17	22	19	290
3	(Germany) Ralf Bohn	17	Ret	**Ret**	20	16	17	19	17	21†	16	16	14	21	20	16	19	18	264
4	(Netherlands) Ronald van de Laar						19	20											28
5	(Germany) Klaus Abbelen														21	DNS			16
Guest drivers ineligible for series points
	(Sweden) Lars Bertil Rantzow																21	20	0
	(Germany) Hermann Speck						20	23											0
Pos	Driver	HOC (Germany)		NNS (Germany)	LAU (Germany)		NOR (Germany)		ZAN (Netherlands)		RBR (Austria)		OSC (Germany)		NÜR (Germany)		HOC (Germany)		Pts

† — Drivers did not finish the race, but were classified as they completed over 90% of the race distance.
