= Christopher Zöchling =

Austrian racing driver (born 1988)

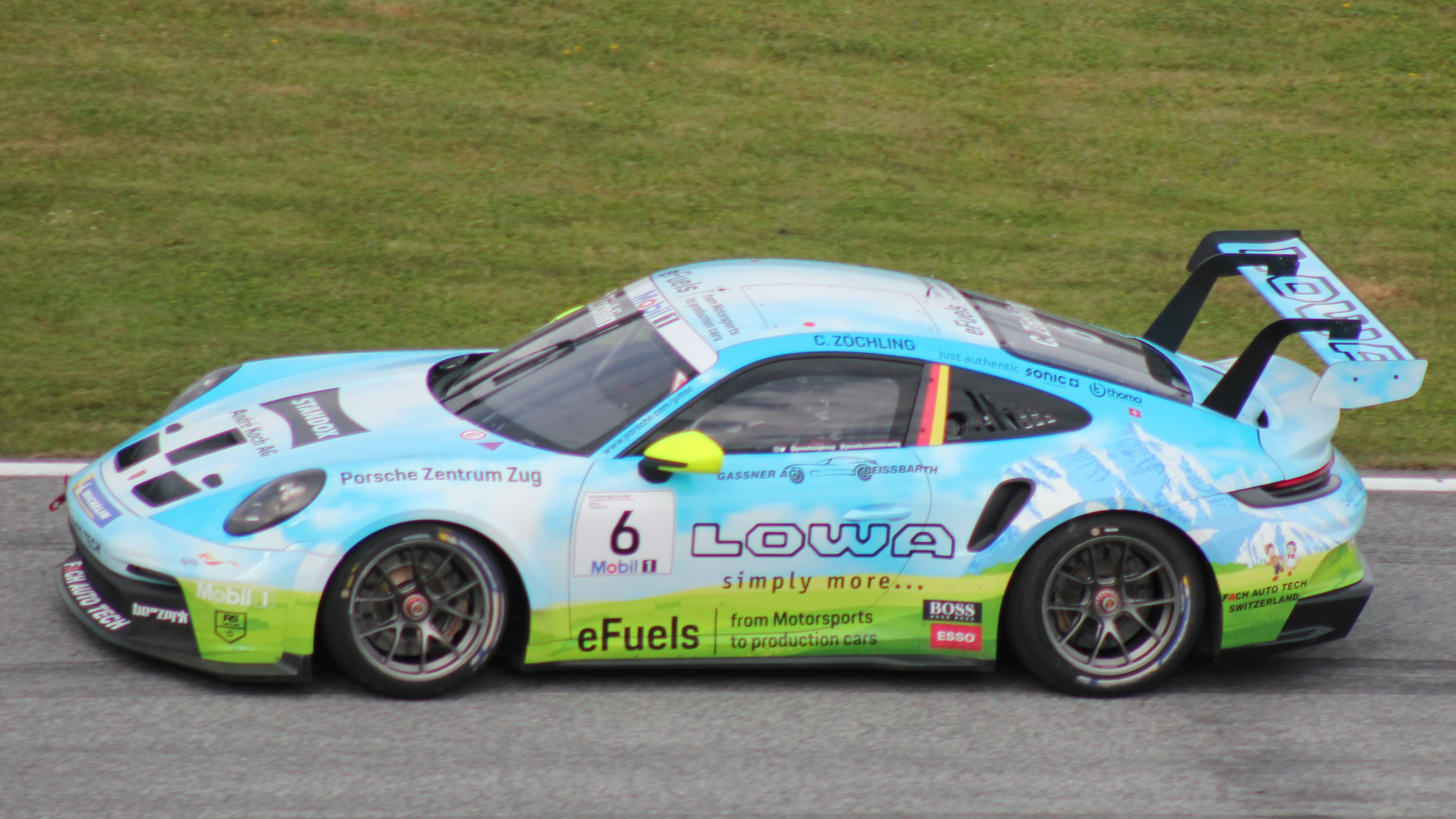
- Zöchling in 2021
- Nationality: (Austria) Austrian
- Born: 26 February 1988 (age 38) Leoben, Austria
- Categorisation: FIA Silver

Christopher Zöchling (born 26 February 1988) is an Austrian racing driver who last competed in the 24H Series Middle East for RABDAN by Fulgenzi Racing.

A Porsche one-make specialist, Zöchling is a race winner in PCCD and Porsche Supercup, and has also driven sporadically in GT World Challenge Europe.

== Career ==
Born in the Austrian city of Leoben, Zöchling lived in Africa in his early years, before moving to Turkey and later Dubai in 2003, where he still resides to this day. After making his single-seater debut in Formula Renault 2.0 Germany in 2005, Zöchling raced in the first three rounds of the Asian Formula Renault Challenge the following year, before participating in a Champ Car test at Toronto in September of that year. Following a year on the sidelines, Zöchling made select appearances in the Atlantic Championship for Paladin Motorsports, and was in talks to race in the 2008–09 GP2 Asia Series for Durango, but instead raced in the Speedcar Series for them and Continental Circus, scoring a best result of second at Dubai from pole position.

Zöchling then primarily raced part-time in the VLN Series across the following three seasons, before joining Konrad Motorsport for most of the 2013 Porsche Carrera Cup Germany. Staying with Konrad for 2014, Zöchling raced with them in both Porsche Carrera Cup Germany and Porsche Supercup, most notably scoring a win at Oschersleben in the former to take sixth in points. Continuing with Konrad in PCCD the following year, Zöchling finished second at the Hockenheimring and third at the Nürburgring Nordschleife en route to a ninth-place points finish. In parallel, Zöchling also raced in all but two races of Porsche Supercup for Fach Auto Tech, winning at the Red Bull Ring as he secured sixth in the overall standings. During 2015, Zöchling also raced for Konrad Motorsport at the 24 Hours of Daytona, driving a Porsche 911 GT America in the GTD class.

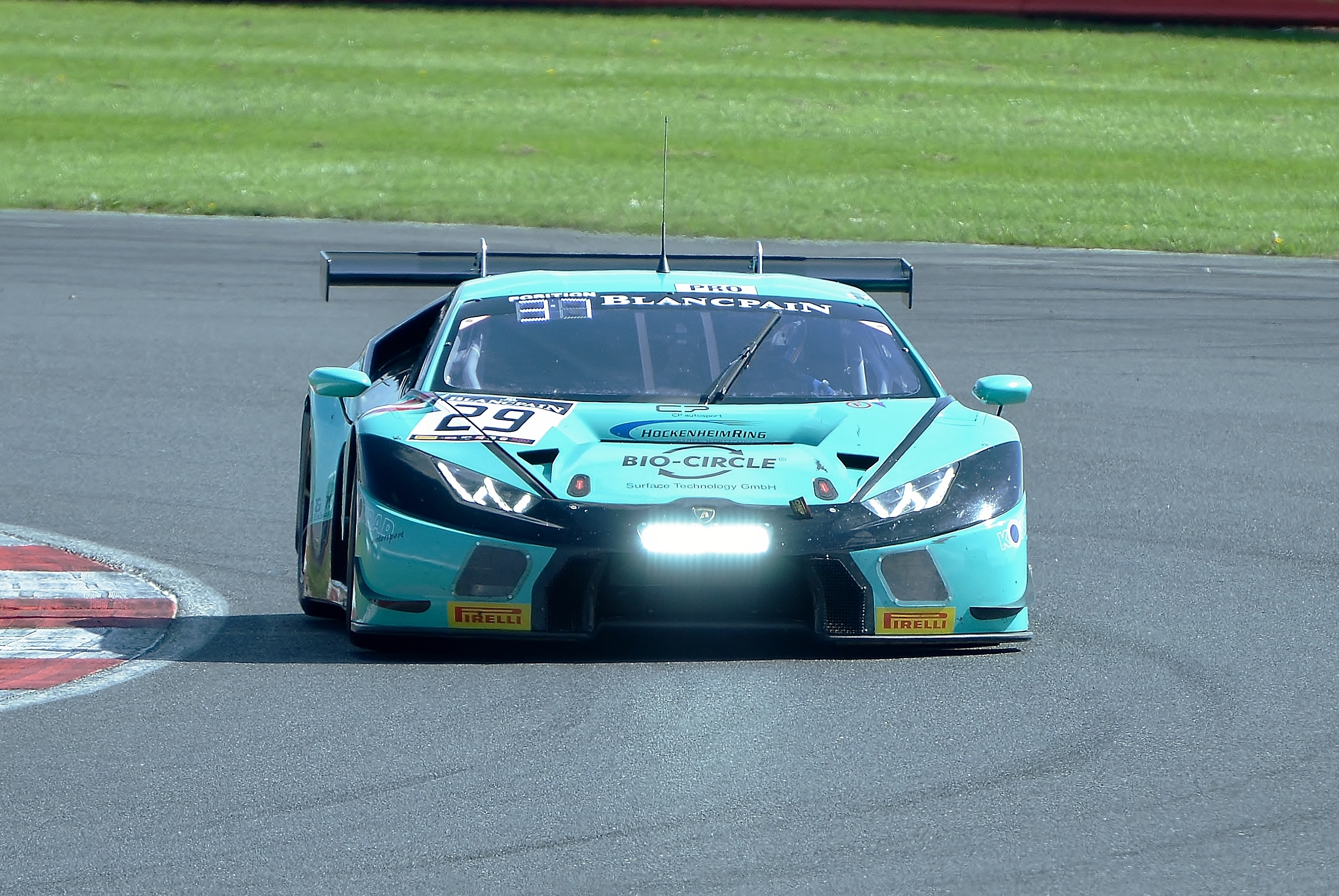
Zöchling at the wheel of his Konrad Motorsport Lamborghini at Silverstone during the 2016 Blancpain GT Series.

In 2016, Zöchling remained with Konrad to compete in the Blancpain GT Series Endurance Cup and Lamborghini Super Trofeo Europe, Sharing a Lamborghini Huracán GT3 with Jules Gounon in the former, he could only muster a best finish of 24th, but in the latter scored two Pro-class podiums to take fifth in points. The following year, Zöchling switched to MRS GT-Racing to return to Porsche Carrera Cup Germany, scoring four podiums, with a best result of second at the Lausitzring, as he finished fourth in the overall points. During 2017, Zöchling also raced for Lamborghini-fielding Attempto Racing at the Hungaroring round of the Blancpain GT Series Sprint Cup, scoring a Silver Cup podium in the championship race.

Remaining with MRS GT-Racing for 2018, Zöchling raced in ADAC GT Masters aboard the team's BMW M6 GT3, scoring a best result of fifth in race one at Most alongside Jens Klingmann. During 2018, Zöchling also made select appearances in the GT4 European Series for Audi-aligned Phoenix Racing, taking a Pro-Am podium at Brands Hatch, as well as finishing second in the GT Cup class at the Gulf 12 Hours for GDL Racing. Across the next two years, Zöchling only raced at the Dubai 24 Hour for MRS GT-Racing and Dinamic Motorsport, most notably taking a 991 class podium with the former in 2019.

The following year, Zöchling reunited with Fach Auto Tech for a dual campaign in Porsche Carrera Cup Germany and Porsche Supercup, under a German licence. In the German series, Zöchling took three podiums, including a best result of second at the Sachsenring, as he finished fifth in points. In Porsche Supercup meanwhile, Zöchling scored a best result of fourth at both Monaco and Spa to end the year 10th in the overall standings. Remaining with Porsche Carrera Cup machinery for 2022, Zöchling mainly raced in all but two rounds of GT Cup Open Europe for GDL Racing, taking wins at Le Castellet and Barcelona en route to a seventh-place points finish.

In 2023, Zöchling returned to GT3 competition as he reunited with Porsche-linked Dinamic GT Huber Racing to race in the Bronze Cup of the GT World Challenge Europe Sprint Cup. He also raced at the 24 Hours of Spa with the same team, as well as the 3 Hours of Barcelona with Audi-affiliated Tresor Attempto Racing. At the end of the year, Zöchling raced in the 2023–24 Middle East Trophy for RABDAN by Fulgenzi Racing, finishing third in the 992 standings with two podiums to his name. In 2024, Zöchling was set to return to Dinamic to compete in the GT World Challenge Europe Endurance Cup as the team switched to a Ford Mustang GT3, but ultimately only raced twice after the team reverted to Porsche machinery and scrambled to put together a two-car roster. Following that, Zöchling made select appearances in the 2025 Middle East Trophy and the 2025–26 24H Series Middle East for RABDAN by Fulgenzi Racing in the 992 class.

== Karting record ==
=== Karting career summary ===
Season	Series	Team	Position
2002	Southern German ADAC Kart Cup – ICA-Junior		18th
2003	German 4-Stroke Championship		7th

== Racing record ==
=== Racing career summary ===
Season	Series	Team	Races	Wins	Poles	F/Laps	Podiums	Points	Position
2005	Formula Renault 2.0 Germany	RST Auinger	15	0	0	0	0	104	15th
2006	Asian Formula Renault Challenge	Shangsai FRD Team	4	0	0	0	0	37	13th
2008	Dubai 24 Hour – A6	Ebbing Motorsport 1	1	0	0	0	0	—N/a	DNF
2008	Atlantic Championship	Paladin Motorsports	3	0	0	0	0	18	24th
2008–09	Speedcar Series	Durango	4	0	0	0	0	19	8th
2008–09	Speedcar Series	Continental Circus	4	0	1	1	1	19	8th
2010	VLN Endurance – SP7	Car Collection	3	0	0	0	1		
2011	VLN Endurance – SP7	Car Collection	1	0	0	0	0		
2012	VLN Endurance – SP9	Car Collection	3	0	0	0	2		
2012	24 Hours of Nürburgring – SP7	Car Collection	1	0	0	0	0	—N/a	DNF
2013	Porsche Carrera Cup Germany – Class A	Konrad Motorsport	11	0	0	0	0	43	17th
2013	VLN Endurance – SP9	CC Car Collection Autohandels	3	0	0	0	0		
2013	24 Hours of Nürburgring – SP7		1	0	0	0	0	—N/a	5th
2014	Porsche Carrera Cup Germany – Class A	Konrad Motorsport	18	1	0	1	2	167.5	6th
2014	Porsche Supercup	Konrad Motorsport	10	0	0	0	0	41	14th
2015	United SportsCar Championship – GTD	Konrad Motorsport	1	0	0	0	0	1	61st
2015	Porsche Carrera Cup Germany – Class A	Konrad Motorsport	18	0	0	0	2	136	9th
2015	Porsche Supercup	Fach Auto Tech	8	1	0	0	2	93	6th
2015	VLN Endurance – SP9	Phoenix Racing	1	0	0	0	0		
2015	P9 Challenge – Class 4		2	2	2	2	2		
2016	24H Series – 991	Lechner Racing Middle East	2	0	0	0	1	0	NC
2016	IMSA SportsCar Championship – GTD	Konrad Motorsport	0	0	0	0	0	0	66th
2016	Blancpain GT Series Endurance Cup	Konrad Motorsport	4	0	0	0	0	0	NC
2016	Blancpain GT Series Endurance Cup – Pro-Am	Konrad Motorsport	2	0	0	0	0	6	37th
2016	Lamborghini Super Trofeo Europe – Pro	Konrad Motorsport	12	0	0	0	2	68	5th
2016	VLN Series – SP9	Konrad Motorsport	2	0	0	0	0		
2016	24 Hours of Nürburgring – SP9	Konrad Motorsport	1	0	0	0	0	—N/a	DNF
2016	Lamborghini Super Trofeo World Final – Pro	Konrad Motorsport	2	0	0	0	0	8	8th
2017	24H Series – 991	MSG Motorsport	3	0	1	2	2	24	4th
2017	24H Series – A6 Pro	Konrad Motorsport	1	0	0	0	1	0	NC
2017	Porsche Carrera Cup Germany	MRS GT-Racing	14	0	2	2	4	171	4th
2017	Blancpain GT Series Sprint Cup	Attempto Racing	2	0	0	0	0	0	NC
2017	Blancpain GT Series Sprint Cup – Silver	Attempto Racing	2	0	0	0	1	17	11th
2018	24H GT Series – SPX	MRS GT-Racing	1	0	0	0	1	0	NC
2018	ADAC GT Masters	MRS GT-Racing	14	0	0	0	0	17	27th
2018	Lamborghini Super Trofeo Middle East – Pro-Am		6	0	0	0	1	34	5th
2018	GT4 European Series – Pro-Am	Phoenix Racing	4	0	1	1	1	30	19th
2018	Porsche Supercup	MRS GT-Racing	1	0	0	0	0	9	20th
2018	Gulf 12 Hours – GT Cup	GDL Racing	1	0	0	0	1	—N/a	**2nd**
2019	24H GT Series Continents – 991	MRS GT-Racing	1	0	0	0	1	28	NC
2020	24H GT Series Continents – GT3 Am	Dinamic Motorsport	1	0	0	0	0	9	NC
2021	Porsche Carrera Cup Germany	Fach Auto Racing	16	0	0	0	3	156	5th
2021	Porsche Supercup	Fach Auto Racing	8	0	0	0	0	50	10th
2022	24H GT Series Continents – 992	ID Racing	1	0	0	0	0	26	NC
2022	GT Cup Open Europe	GDL Racing	6	2	1			45	7th
2022–23	Middle East Trophy – 992	Fach Auto Tech	1	0	0	0	0	36	NC
2023	Asian Le Mans Series – GT	Dinamic GT	0	0	0	0	0	0	NC
2023	24H GT Series – 992	Rabdan Motorsport by HRT Performance	1	0	0	0	1	32	NC
2023	GT World Challenge Europe Endurance Cup	Dinamic GT Huber Racing	1	0	0	0	0	0	NC
2023	GT World Challenge Europe Endurance Cup	Tresor Attempto Racing	1	0	0	0	0	0	NC
2023	GT World Challenge Europe Endurance Cup – Bronze	Dinamic GT Huber Racing	1	0	0	0	0	0	NC
2023	GT World Challenge Europe Endurance Cup – Bronze	Tresor Attempto Racing	1	0	0	0	0	0	NC
2023	GT World Challenge Europe Sprint Cup	Dinamic GT Huber Racing	6	0	0	0	0	0	NC
2023	GT World Challenge Europe Sprint Cup – Bronze	Dinamic GT Huber Racing	6	0	0	0	0	27	8th
2023–24	Middle East Trophy – 992	RABDAN by Fulgenzi Racing	3	0	0	0	2	68	**3rd**
2024	GT World Challenge Europe Endurance Cup	Dinamic GT	2	0	0	0	0	0	NC
2024	GT World Challenge Europe Endurance Cup – Silver	Dinamic GT	1	0	0	0	0	6	32nd
2024	GT World Challenge Europe Endurance Cup – Bronze	Dinamic GT	1	0	0	0	0	0	NC
2024	Intercontinental GT Challenge	Dinamic GT	1	0	0	0	0	0	NC
2025	Middle East Trophy – 992	RABDAN by Fulgenzi Racing	2	0	0	0	0	14	9th
2025–26	24H Series Middle East – 992 Am	RABDAN by Fulgenzi Racing	2	0	0	0	1	32	7th

^{†} As Zöchling was a guest driver, he was ineligible to score points.

=== American open-wheel racing results ===
==== Atlantic Championship ====
(key) (Races in bold indicate pole position) (Races in italics indicate fastest lap)

Year	Team	1	2	3	4	5	6	7	8	9	10	11	Rank	Points
2008	Paladin Motorsports	LBH	LGA; 12	MTT	EDM1; 18	EDM2; 16	ROA1	ROA2	TRR	NJ	UTA	ATL	24th	18

=== Complete Porsche Supercup results ===
(key) (Races in bold indicate pole position) (Races in italics indicate fastest lap)

Year	Team	1	2	3	4	5	6	7	8	9	10	11	Pos.	Pts
2014	Konrad Motorsport	CAT; 7	MON; 14	RBR; 17	SIL; 15	HOC; 12	HUN; 7	SPA; 17	MNZ; 21	COA; 10	COA; 9		14th	41
2015	Fach Auto Tech	CAT	MON	RBR; 1	SIL; 7	HUN; 10	SPA; 3	SPA; 4	MNZ; 9	MNZ; 5	COA; C	COA; 7	6th	93
2018	MRS GT-Racing	CAT	MON	RBR	SIL	HOC	HUN; 7	SPA	MNZ	MEX	MEX		20th	9
2021	Fach Auto Tech	MON; 4	RBR; 7	RBR; 9	HUN; NC	SPA; 4	ZND; Ret	MNZ; 14	MNZ; 11				10th	50

=== Complete IMSA SportsCar Championship results ===
(key) (Races in bold indicate pole position; results in italics indicate fastest lap)

Year	Team	Class	Make	Engine	1	2	3	4	5	6	7	8	9	10	11	Pos.	Points
2015	Konrad Motorsport	GTD	Porsche 911 GT America	Porsche 4.0 L Flat-6	DAY; 19†	SEB	LGA	DET	WGL	LIM	ELK	VIR	COA	PET		61st	1
2016	Konrad Motorsport	GTD	Lamborghini Huracán GT3	Lamborghini Huracán GT3	DAY	SEB; DNS	LAG	DET	WGL	MOS	LIM	ROA	VIR	COA	PET	66th	0

=== Complete GT World Challenge Europe results ===
==== GT World Challenge Europe Endurance Cup ====
(Races in bold indicate pole position) (Races in italics indicate fastest lap)

Year	Team	Car	Class	1	2	3	4	5	6	7	Pos.	Points
2016	Konrad Motorsport	Lamborghini Huracán GT3	Pro	MNZ; Ret	SIL; 24	LEC					NC	0
2016	Konrad Motorsport	Lamborghini Huracán GT3	Pro-Am				SPA; 6H; 28	SPA; 12H; 29	SPA; 24H; 30	NÜR; 27	37th	6
2023	Dinamic GT Huber Racing	Porsche 911 GT3 R (992)	Bronze	MNZ	LEC	SPA; 6H; 44	SPA; 12H; 38	SPA; 24H; 48†	NÜR		NC	0
2023	Tresor Attempto Racing	Audi R8 LMS Evo II	Bronze							CAT; 42	NC	0
2024	Dinamic GT	Porsche 911 GT3 R (992)	Silver	LEC; 42							32nd	6
2024	Dinamic GT	Porsche 911 GT3 R (992)	Bronze		SPA; 6H; Ret	SPA; 12H; Ret	SPA; 24H; Ret	NÜR	MNZ	JED	NC	0

==== GT World Challenge Europe Sprint Cup ====
(key) (Races in bold indicate pole position) (Races in italics indicate fastest lap)

Year	Team	Car	Class	1	2	3	4	5	6	7	8	9	10	Pos.	Points
2017	Attempto Racing	Lamborghini Huracán GT3	Silver	MIS; QR	MIS; CR	BRH; QR	BRH; CR	ZOL; QR	ZOL; CR	HUN; QR; 28	HUN; CR; 20	NÜR; QR	NÜR; CR	11th	17
2023	Dinamic GT Huber Racing	Porsche 911 GT3 R (992)	Bronze	MIS; 1; 30	MIS; 2; 29	HOC; 1; 21	HOC; 2; 29	VAL; 1; 28	VAL; 2; 28					8th	27

=== Complete ADAC GT Masters results ===
(key) (Races in bold indicate pole position; races in italics indicate fastest lap)

Year	Team	Car	1	2	3	4	5	6	7	8	9	10	11	12	13	14	Pos.	Points
2018	MRS GT-Racing	BMW M6 GT3	OSC; 1; 31	OSC; 2; 19	MST; 1; 5	MST; 2; 10	RBR; 1 Ret	RBR; 2; 7	NÜR; 1 Ret	NÜR; 2; 18	ZAN; 1 Ret	ZAN; 2; 29	SAC; 1; 12	SAC; 2 Ret	HOC; 1 Ret	HOC; 2; 20	27th	17

=== Complete GT4 European Series results ===
(key) (Races in bold indicate pole position) (Races in italics indicate fastest lap)

Year	Team	Car	Class	1	2	3	4	5	6	7	8	9	10	11	12	Pos	Points
2018	Phoenix Racing	Audi R8 LMS GT4	Pro-Am	ZOL; 1	ZOL; 2	BRH; 1; 21	BRH; 2; 16	**MIS**; **1**; 24	MIS; 2 Ret	SPA; 1	SPA; 2	HUN; 1	HUN; 2	NÜR; 1	NÜR; 2	19th	30
