= Kelvin Fletcher =

British actor and racing driver (born 1984)

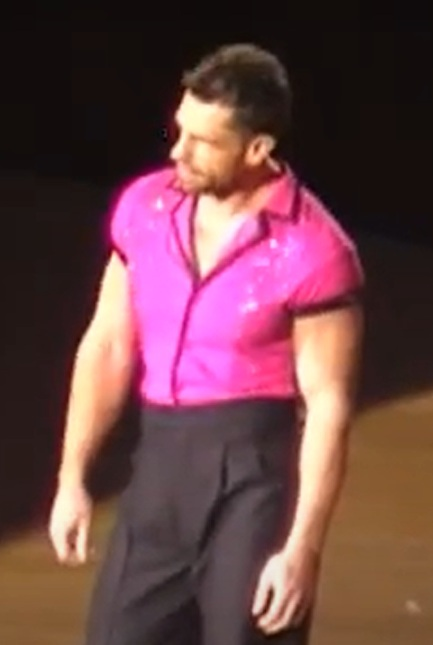
- Fletcher at Strictly live tour 2020
- Born: Kelvin Warren Fletcher; 17 January 1984 (age 42); Oldham, Greater Manchester, England
- Occupations: Actor; model; automobile racing driver; presenter; farmer
- Years active: 1993–present
- Known for: Emmerdale (1996–2016)
- Spouse: Elizabeth Marsland (m. 2015)
- Children: 4

Kelvin Warren Fletcher (born 17 January 1984) is an English actor, model, racing driver, presenter and farmer. He played Andy Sugden in the ITV soap opera Emmerdale, a role he played from 1996 until 2016. In 2019, Fletcher won the seventeenth series of Strictly Come Dancing with his professional partner Oti Mabuse.

== Early life ==
Fletcher attended Mayfield Primary School in Derker, Greater Manchester for his primary school education, and North Chadderton School, Chadderton, for his secondary education.

Fletcher is the oldest of three boys; his youngest brother, Brayden, is also an actor, appearing in Coronation Street in 2016. His half sister is actress and musician, Keeley Forsyth. At the age of six, Fletcher started attending drama classes at the Oldham Theatre Workshop and was first seen on television on a Saturday Disney report when he was starring as Charlie in Charlie Is My Darling, which he also performed in a special show at the London Palladium.

== Career ==
Fletcher's television career began with appearances in In Suspicious Circumstances, Cracker, Heartbeat, and Chiller. He also co-presented an episode of You've Been Framed, with Jeremy Beadle. In 1996, Fletcher had a bit part in British soap opera, Coronation Street, before joining the cast of Emmerdale, for the role of tearaway Andy Hopwood, a schoolfriend of Robert Sugden. The character was originally scripted to appear in three episodes but was soon offered a longer contract, eventually appearing in 2,134 episodes over the course of 20 years, until he was written out of the soap in 2016. Fletcher went on to become one of the leading and most popular characters in the show, and was nominated for the 1999 British Soap Award for Best Actor, and winning the 1999 British Soap Award for Best Dramatic Performance, at the British Soap Awards in 1999.

On 8 September 2019, it was announced that Fletcher would be a competitor in the 2019 series of the BBC television competition, Strictly Come Dancing, as a replacement for reality TV star Jamie Laing, who had to withdraw from the show prior to airing due to a foot injury. He went on to reach the final and win the competition, resulting in his dance partner, Oti Mabuse, winning her first title on the show.

Week #	Dance / Song	Judges' scores					Result
Week #	Dance / Song	Horwood	Mabuse	Ballas	Tonioli	Total	Result
1	Samba / "La Vida Es Un Carnaval"	8	8	8	8	32	No elimination
2	Waltz / "What the World Needs Now is Love"	7	7	7	7	28	Safe
3	Charleston / "Trip a Little Light Fantastic"	9	9	10	10	38	Safe
4	Rumba / "Ain't No Sunshine"	9	9	9	9	36	Safe
5	Cha-cha-cha / "Get Stupid"	8	8	8	9	33	Safe
6	Tango / "Bad Guy"	9	9	9	9	36	Safe
7	Viennese waltz / "Say Something"	8	9	8	9	34	Safe
8	Salsa / "Let's Hear It for the Boy"	8	9	9	9	35	Safe
9	Jive / "Jailhouse Rock"	9	10	10	10	39	Safe
10	Street/Commercial / "Do I Love You (Indeed I Do)"	8	10	10	10	38	Safe
11	American Smooth / "Gaston"	9	10	10	10	39	Safe
12	Quickstep / "The Lady Is a Tramp"; Paso doble / "Seven Nation Army"	10; 9	10; 10	10; 9	10; 9	40; 37	Safe
13	Rumba / "Ain't No Sunshine"; Freestyle / "Shout"; Samba / "La Vida Es Un Carnaval"	9; 10; 9	10; 10; 10	10; 10; 10	10; 10; 10	39; 40; 39	WINNER

In 2021, Fletcher and his wife, Liz Marsland, bought a 120 acre plot of land in the village of Wincle near Macclesfield, Cheshire, with the plan to set up a farm. Their efforts were filmed for a BBC TV series, Kelvin's Big Farming Adventure which aired in January 2022. In 2023 the couple filmed a new series on the farm for ITV, Fletchers' Family Farm, which consisted of 8 hour long episodes as well as a special Fletchers' Family Farm at Christmas broadcast on 24 December 2023.

Since leaving Emmerdale, Fletcher has appeared in Death in Paradise, and Moving On. In January 2022, he played the part of Jack in The Teacher alongside Sheridan Smith.

== Motor racing career ==
Fletcher first ventured into motor racing after a visit to a motoring show with his father in January 2012. He obtained an MSA Competition Licence and won the 2012 Silverstone Classic Celebrity Challenge race. Fletcher also competed in the Mighty Mini's and the Team Trophy. He was invited to partake in the Porsche Supercup support race of the 2014 British Grand Prix, where he finished 22nd.

Fletcher signed a contract to drive a Chevrolet Cruze entered by the Power Maxed Racing team in the 2016 British Touring Car Championship in March that year. He missed the Knockhill Racing Circuit and the Rockingham Motor Speedway rounds because his wife was due to give birth to their first child. Dave Newsham drove his car instead. During the season, Fletcher competed in 24 races spread over eight rounds of three events. He scored no points and was 31st in the final drivers' championship standings.

For the 2017 season, Fletcher moved to the British GT Championship and shared a Nissan 370Z Nismo with fellow driver Tim Eakin for the UltraTek Racing RJN in the GT4 category. He was mentored by FIA World Endurance Championship and 24 Hours of Le Mans class victor Martin Plowman during his rookie season. After three years of running in GT4 with Plowman, they would move up to the GT3 class in a Bentley Continental.

== Personal life ==
Fletcher married fellow actor Elizabeth Marsland, whom he had known since the age of eight, in a secret ceremony on 28 November 2015. They have four children: a daughter and three sons, two of whom are twins. Fletcher is also a fan of rugby league; growing up, he was a fan of Paul Sculthorpe and Kevin Sinfield as they were both from Oldham, and he makes occasional appearances at testimonial matches of famous players.

== Filmography ==
=== Film ===
Year	Title	Role	Notes
2020	We Go in at Dawn	John Seabourne	
2022	Jack Absolute Flies Again	Dudley Scunthorpe	

=== Television ===
Year	Title	Role	Notes
1994	Three Seven Eleven	Darren	Main cast; 10 episodes
1994	Cracker	Boy	Episode: "The Big Crunch: Part 3"
1995	Chiller	Gordon	Episode: "Number Six"
1995	Heartbeat	Colin Ellis	Episode: "Unfinished Business"
1996	Coronation Street	Lad	Episode: #1.3987
1996–2016	Emmerdale	Andy Sugden	Regular role; 2,243 episodes
2012	Who Wants to be a Millionaire	Himself (with his brother Brayden)	'Schools Out' Episode
2018	The Shore	Steve	Main cast
2019	Strictly Come Dancing	Contestant (partnered with Oti Mabuse)	Series winner
2021	Death in Paradise	Gavin Jackson	Episode: #10.3
2021	Moving On	Nathan	Episode: "More Than Words"
2022	Kelvin's Big Farming Adventure	Himself	6 episodes
2022	The Teacher	Jack	3 episodes
2022	McDonald and Dodds	Donovan Janaway	Episode: "A Billion Beats"
2023	Fletchers' Family Farm	Himself	8 episodes plus Christmas special
2024	Father Brown	Brian Fleming	Episode: #11.1 "The Kembleston Olimpicks"

== Racing results ==
=== Complete Porsche Carrera Cup Great Britain results ===
(key) (Races in bold indicate pole position – 1 point awarded all races) (Races in italics indicate fastest lap – 1 point awarded all races)

Year	Team	Car	Class	1	2	3	4	5	6	7	8	9	10	11	12	13	14	15	16	17	18	19	DC	Points
2014	Redline Racing	Porsche 991 GT3	PA2	BRH; 1; 12	BRH; 2; 11	DON; 1	DON; 2												SIL; 1; 8	SIL; 2; 6	BRH; 1	BRH; 2	13th	46
2014	Team Parker Racing	Porsche 991 GT3	PA2					THR; 1; 10	THR; 2; 10	SAR; 1	CRO; 1	CRO; 2	SNE; 1	SNE; 2	KNO; 1	KNO; 2	ROC; 1	ROC; 2					13th	46

=== Complete Porsche Supercup results ===
Year	Team	1	2	3	4	5	6	7	8	9	10	DC	Points
2014	Porsche Cars GB	ESP	MON	AUT	GBR; 22	GER	HUN	BEL	ITA	USA	USA	NC†	0†

^{†} As Fletcher was a guest driver, he was ineligible to score points.

=== Complete British Touring Car Championship results ===
(key) (Races in bold indicate pole position – 1 point awarded in first race) (Races in italics indicate fastest lap – 1 point awarded all races) (* signifies that driver lead race for at least one lap – 1 point awarded all races)

Year	Team	Car	1	2	3	4	5	6	7	8	9	10	11	12	13	14	15	16	17	18	19	20	21	22	23	24	25	26	27	28	29	30	DC	Points
2016	Power Maxed Racing	Chevrolet Cruze	BRH; 1 Ret	BRH; 2; 25	BRH; 3 Ret	DON; 1; 24	DON; 2 Ret	DON; 3; 20	THR; 1 Ret	THR; 2; 23	THR; 3; 17	OUL; 1; 29	OUL; 2; 23	OUL; 3; 22	CRO; 1 Ret	CRO; 2; 22	CRO; 3 Ret	SNE; 1 Ret	SNE; 2 Ret	SNE; 3; 18	KNO; 1	KNO; 2	KNO; 3	ROC; 1	ROC; 2	ROC; 3	SIL; 1; 22	SIL; 2; 22	SIL; 3; 26	BRH; 1; 24	BRH; 2; 24	BRH; 3; 21	31st	0

=== Complete British GT Championship results ===
(key) (Races in bold indicate pole position) (Races in italics indicate fastest lap)

Year	Team	Car	Class	1	2	3	4	5	6	7	8	9	10	DC	Points
2017	Team RJN Nissan with UltraTek	Nissan 370Z GT4	GT4	OUL; 1; 23	OUL; 2; 19	ROC; 1; 22	SNE; 1; 25	SNE; 2; 19	SIL; 1; 24	SPA; 1; 23	SPA; 2; 23	BRH; 1; 19	DON; 1 Ret	22nd	9
2018	UltraTek Racing / Team RJN	Nissan 370Z GT4	GT4	OUL; 1; 32	OUL; 2; 17	ROC; 1; 13	SNE; 1; 22	SNE; 2; 22	SIL; 1; 19	SPA; 1; 20	BRH; 1; 10	DON; 1 Ret		9th	65.5
2019	Beechdean AMR	Aston Martin Vantage GT4	GT4	OUL; 1; 18	OUL; 2; 17	SNE; 1; 21	SNE; 2; 19	SIL; 1; 14	DON; 1; 20	SPA; 1; 23	BRH; 1; 17	DON; 1; 15		5th	98.5
2021	JRM Racing	Bentley Continental GT3	GT3	BRH; 1; 7										11th	59.5
2021	Paddock Motorsport	Bentley Continental GT3	GT3		SIL; 1; 25	DON; 1; 7	SPA; 1	SNE; 1; 2	SNE; 2; 8	**OUL**; **1**; 9	OUL; 2; 9	DON; 1; 10		11th	59.5
2022	Paddock Motorsport	McLaren 720S GT3	GT3	OUL; 1; 15	OUL; 2; 3	SIL; 1	DON; 1; 11	SNE; 1	SNE; 2	SPA; 1	BRH; 1; 21	DON; 1		26th	15

Sporting positions
Preceded by Scott Malvern; Nick Jones	British GT Championship; GT4 Pro-Am Champion; 2019; With: Martin Plowman	Succeeded by Mia Flewitt; Euan Hankey
