= 2014 Porsche Supercup =

22nd Porsche Supercup season

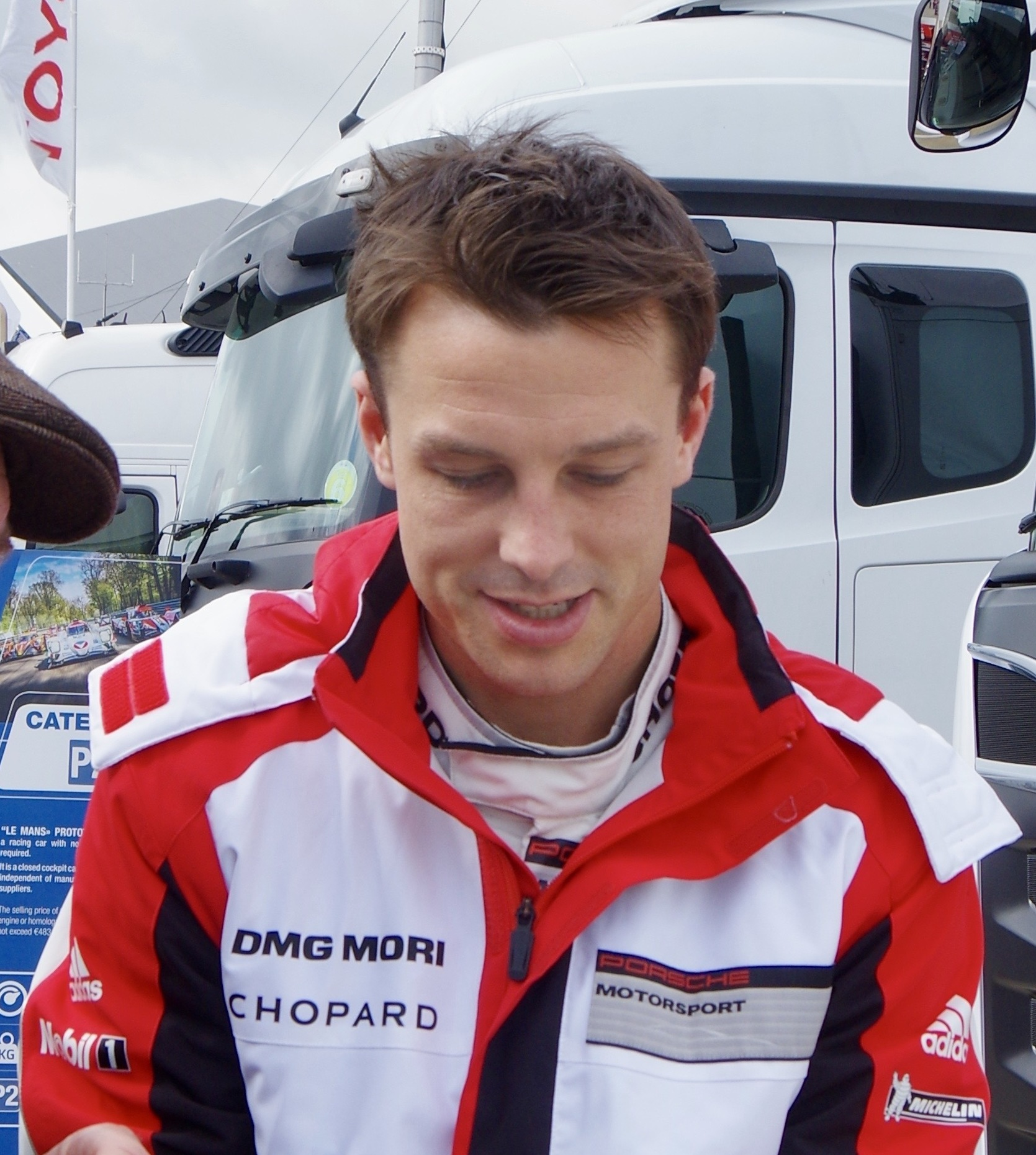
Earl Bamber (pictured in 2017) won the overall Drivers' Championship title and was named as Porsche Factory Driver for 2015.

The 2014 Porsche Mobil 1 Supercup season was the 22nd Porsche Supercup season. It began on 11 May at Circuit de Catalunya and finished on 2 November at Circuit of the Americas, after ten scheduled races, all of which were support events for the 2014 Formula One season.

== Teams and drivers ==
Team	No.	Drivers	Class	Rounds
(Germany) McGregor powered by Attempto Racing	1	(Netherlands) Pieter Schothorst	R	All
(Germany) McGregor powered by Attempto Racing	2	(Spain) Alex Riberas	R	1–8
(Germany) McGregor powered by Attempto Racing	2	(Netherlands) Dennis van de Laar	R	9
(Germany) McGregor powered by Attempto Racing	3	(Germany) Chris Bauer	R	1–2
(Germany) McGregor powered by Attempto Racing	3	(Switzerland) Fabien Thuner	R	3, 6
(Germany) McGregor powered by Attempto Racing	3	(France) Kévin Estre		4–5, 8
(Germany) McGregor powered by Attempto Racing	3	(Finland) Antti Buri		7
(Germany) McGregor powered by Attempto Racing	3	(France) Vincent Beltoise	G	9
(Austria) Walter Lechner Racing Team	4	(Germany) Michael Ammermüller		All
(Austria) Walter Lechner Racing Team	5	(Austria) Clemens Schmid		All
(Austria) Walter Lechner Racing Team	6	(Switzerland) Jeffrey Schmidt	R	1–3
(Austria) Walter Lechner Racing Team	6	(Denmark) Nicki Thiim		4–9
(Austria) Walter Lechner Racing Team	40	(France) Tom Dillmann	G	3
(Austria) Walter Lechner Racing Team	40	(Germany) Hannes Waimer	G	5, 9
(Germany) Konrad Motorsport	7	(Austria) Klaus Bachler		All
(Germany) Konrad Motorsport	8	(Germany) Christian Engelhart		All
(Germany) Konrad Motorsport	9	(Austria) Christopher Zöchling	R	All
(Germany) Konrad Motorsport	36	(Switzerland) Rolf Ineichen	G	2–3, 5
(Germany) Team Project 1	10	(United States) Sean Johnston		1–2, 4–9
(Germany) Team Project 1	10	(France) Sébastien Ogier	G	3
(Germany) Team Project 1	11	(Germany) Sven Müller	R	All
(Germany) Team Project 1	12	(Austria) Philipp Eng		All
(Germany) Team Project 1	54	(United States) Madison Snow	G	9
(Austria) Verva Lechner Racing Team	14	(Poland) Kuba Giermaziak		All
(Austria) Verva Lechner Racing Team	15	(United Kingdom) Ben Barker		All
(Austria) Verva Lechner Racing Team	37	(Netherlands) Sebastiaan Bleekemolen	G	2
(Austria) Verva Lechner Racing Team	37	(Austria) Andreas Mayerl	G	3
(Austria) Verva Lechner Racing Team	37	(United States) William Peluchiwski	G	9
(Poland) FÖRCH Racing by Lukas Motorsport	16	(Poland) Robert Lukas		1–6, 8–9
(Poland) FÖRCH Racing by Lukas Motorsport	17	(United States) Connor De Phillippi	R	1–8
(Poland) FÖRCH Racing by Lukas Motorsport	18	(Netherlands) Bas Schothorst		All
(Poland) FÖRCH Racing by Lukas Motorsport	48	(Mexico) Christofer Berckhan Ramírez	G	5–6
(Poland) FÖRCH Racing by Lukas Motorsport	55	(Mexico) Santiago Creel	G	9
(Switzerland) FACH AUTO TECH	19	(New Zealand) Earl Bamber	R	All
(Switzerland) FACH AUTO TECH	20	(Switzerland) Philip Hirschi	R	1–3
(Switzerland) FACH AUTO TECH	20	(Malaysia) Alif Hamdan	R	4–8
(Switzerland) FACH AUTO TECH	20	(Switzerland) Philipp Frommenwiler	R	9
(Switzerland) FACH AUTO TECH	51	(Germany) Daniel Keilwitz	G	8
(United States) MOMO-Megatron	21	(Italy) Mario Marasca	R	1–6
(United States) MOMO-Megatron	21	(Netherlands) Jaap van Lagen		7–8
(United States) MOMO-Megatron	21	(Spain) Pepe Massot	R	9
(United States) MOMO-Megatron	22	(Italy) Enrico Fulgenzi	R	1–2
(United States) MOMO-Megatron	22	(United Kingdom) Paul Rees	R	9
(United States) MOMO-Megatron	23	(Italy) Thomas Biagi		All
(France) Sébastien Loeb Racing	30	(France) Roland Bervillé	G	1
(France) Sébastien Loeb Racing	30	(France) Maxime Jousse	G	2, 7
(France) Sébastien Loeb Racing	31	(Norway) Roar Lindland	G	1–2, 7
(France) Sébastien Loeb Racing	47	(France) Joffrey De Narda	G	7
(France) PRO GT by Alméras	32	(France) Marc Cattaneo	G	1, 7
(France) PRO GT by Alméras	35	(France) Marc Cattaneo	G	2
(France) PRO GT by Alméras	33	(France) Côme Ledogar	G	1, 7
(Austria) Lechner Racing Academy ME	34	(Germany) Hannes Waimer	G	2
(Austria) ZaWotec Racing	38	(Austria) Marko Klein	G	3
(Austria) ZaWotec Racing	39	(Germany) Lukas Schreier	G	3
(United Kingdom) Porsche Cars GB	41	(United Kingdom) Kelvin Fletcher	G	4
(United Kingdom) Porsche Cars GB	42	(United Kingdom) Josh Webster	G	4
(United Kingdom) Team Parker Racing	43	(Republic of Ireland) Karl Leonard	G	4
(United Kingdom) Team Parker Racing	44	(United Kingdom) Graeme Mundy	G	4
(Italy) Antonelli Motorsport	45	(Italy) Glauco Solieri	G	5, 7–8
(Italy) Antonelli Motorsport	46	(Italy) Gianluca Giraudi	G	5
(Italy) Antonelli Motorsport	46	(Italy) Matteo Cairoli	G	7–8
(Italy) Antonelli Motorsport	47	(Italy) Davide Roda	G	5
(Italy) Heaven Motorsport	49	(Italy) Giovanni Berton	G	8
(Italy) Heaven Motorsport	50	(Italy) Enrico Fulgenzi	G	8
(Germany) Konrad Motorsport Austria	53	(United States) Jeff Harrison	G	9
(United States) Kelly–Moss Motorsports	56	(United States) Colin Thompson	G	9
(United States) Kelly–Moss Motorsports	57	(United States) David Ducote	G	9
(Belgium) Mühlner Motorsport	58	(United States) Tomy Drissi	G	9
(Belgium) Mühlner Motorsport	59	(United States) Mark Kvamme	G	9
(Germany) Porsche AG	911	(United States) Patrick Dempsey	G	5

Icon	Meaning
R	Rookie
G	Guest

== Race calendar and results ==
An updated race calendar was released on 12 June, with the round at the Sochi Autodrom being replaced by a round at the Circuit of the Americas.

Round		Circuit	Date	Pole position	Fastest lap	Winning driver	Winning team
1		(Spain) Circuit de Catalunya	11 May	(Austria) Philipp Eng	(New Zealand) Earl Bamber	(New Zealand) Earl Bamber	(Switzerland) FACH AUTO TECH
2		Circuit de Monaco	25 May	(Poland) Kuba Giermaziak	(Austria) Klaus Bachler	(Poland) Kuba Giermaziak	(Austria) Verva Lechner Racing Team
3		(Austria) Red Bull Ring	22 June	(Austria) Philipp Eng	(Germany) Michael Ammermüller	(Poland) Kuba Giermaziak	(Austria) Verva Lechner Racing Team
4		(United Kingdom) Silverstone Circuit	6 July	(Austria) Clemens Schmid	(Germany) Michael Ammermüller	(Austria) Clemens Schmid	(Austria) Walter Lechner Racing Team
5		(Germany) Hockenheimring	20 July	(Denmark) Nicki Thiim	(France) Kévin Estre	(Denmark) Nicki Thiim	(Austria) Walter Lechner Racing Team
6		(Hungary) Hungaroring	27 July	(Poland) Kuba Giermaziak	(Poland) Kuba Giermaziak	(Poland) Kuba Giermaziak	(Austria) Verva Lechner Racing Team
7		(Belgium) Circuit de Spa-Francorchamps	24 August	(New Zealand) Earl Bamber	(New Zealand) Earl Bamber	(New Zealand) Earl Bamber	(Switzerland) FACH AUTO TECH
8		(Italy) Autodromo Nazionale Monza	7 September	(Germany) Sven Müller	(Italy) Matteo Cairoli	(Germany) Sven Müller	(Germany) Team Project 1
9	R1	(United States) Circuit of the Americas	1 November	(Denmark) Nicki Thiim	(Austria) Klaus Bachler	(Denmark) Nicki Thiim	(Austria) Walter Lechner Racing Team
9	R2	(United States) Circuit of the Americas	2 November	(New Zealand) Earl Bamber	(Germany) Michael Ammermüller	(Germany) Michael Ammermüller	(Austria) Walter Lechner Racing Team

== Championship standings ==
=== Drivers' Championship ===
Pos.	Driver	CAT (Spain)	MON (Monaco)	RBR (Austria)	SIL (United Kingdom)	HOC (Germany)	HUN (Hungary)	SPA (Belgium)	MNZ (Italy)	COA (United States)		Points
1	(New Zealand) Earl Bamber	1	9	6	3	2	3	**1**	3	4	**2**	155
2	(Poland) Kuba Giermaziak	8	**1**	1	2	6	**1**	8	4	11	7	132
3	(Germany) Michael Ammermüller	DNS	3	5	5	5	5	Ret	5	2	1	114
4	(Austria) Klaus Bachler	12	10	9	7	4	6	3	2	3	5	112
5	(Austria) Philipp Eng	**2**	2	**Ret**	10	15	9	5	8	5	3	98
6	(United Kingdom) Ben Barker	3	5	8	9	10	8	7	9	7	4	96
7	(Germany) Sven Müller	10	6	3	6	11	Ret	4	**1**	8	10	95
8	(Denmark) Nicki Thiim				20	**1**	2	2	6	**1**	11	91
9	(Germany) Christian Engelhart	4	8	4	13	7	14	Ret	12	6	6	75
10	(Austria) Clemens Schmid	9	21	10	**1**	14	Ret	6	7	9	8	69
11	(United States) Connor De Phillippi	11	4	DSQ	4	8	13	10	13			54
12	(Spain) Alex Riberas	5	19	7	Ret	13	4	16	14			43
13	(Poland) Robert Lukas	Ret	7	11	8	9	11		16	13	12	42
14	(Austria) Christopher Zöchling	7	14	17	15	12	7	17	21	10	9	41
15	(Switzerland) Jeffrey Schmidt	6	DNS	2								28
16	(United States) Sean Johnston	16	11		14	Ret	10	13	11	12	Ret	27
17	(France) Kévin Estre				11	3			Ret			21
18	(Netherlands) Pieter Schothorst	Ret	22	16	12	Ret	12	12	15	15	14	20
19	(Netherlands) Bas Schothorst	13	13	15	17	Ret	17	14	18	14	16	15
20	(Netherlands) Jaap van Lagen							9	Ret			7
21	(Switzerland) Fabien Thuner			12			Ret					4
22	(Switzerland) Philipp Frommenwiler									16	13	3
23	(Italy) Enrico Fulgenzi	14	16						Ret			3
24	(Germany) Chris Bauer	18	15									2
25	(Malaysia) Alif Hamdan				19	18	15	23	22			1
26	(Netherlands) Dennis van de Laar									18	15	1
27	(Switzerland) Philip Hirschi	15	20	19								1
28	(Italy) Thomas Biagi	22†	23	21	16	16	16	18	20	19	25†	0
29	(United Kingdom) Paul Rees									17	22	0
30	(Italy) Mario Marasca	21	Ret	20	Ret	19	18					0
31	(Finland) Antti Buri							20				0
	(Spain) Pepe Massot									Ret	DNS	0
Guest drivers ineligible for points
	(Italy) Matteo Cairoli							15	10			0
	(France) Maxime Jousse		12					11				0
	(Austria) Marko Klein			13								0
	(Switzerland) Rolf Ineichen		19	14		DSQ						0
	(Mexico) Christofer Berckhan Ramírez					17	19					0
	(Norway) Roar Lindland	17	Ret					21				0
	(France) Vincent Beltoise									Ret	17	0
	(Germany) Daniel Keilwitz								17			0
	(United States) Jeff Harrison									20	18	0
	(Netherlands) Sebastiaan Bleekemolen		18									0
	(Austria) Andreas Mayerl			18								0
	(United Kingdom) Josh Webster				18							0
	(United States) David Ducote									21	19	0
	(France) Roland Bervillé	19										0
	(France) Joffrey de Narda							19				0
	(Italy) Giovanni Berton								19			0
	(France) Marc Cattaneo	20	24					Ret				0
	(Mexico) Santiago Creel									Ret	20	0
	(Italy) Gianluca Giraudi					20						0
	(Italy) Glauco Solieri					21		22	23			0
	(United States) Tomy Drissi									22	21	0
	(Republic of Ireland) Karl Leonard				21							0
	(Germany) Hannes Waimer		Ret			22				Ret	23	0
	(United Kingdom) Kelvin Fletcher				22							0
	(United States) Mark Kvamme									23†	24	0
	(United Kingdom) Graeme Mundy				23							0
	(United States) Patrick Dempsey					23						0
	(France) Côme Ledogar	DNS						Ret				0
	(United States) Madison Snow									Ret	DNS	0
	(United States) Colin Thompson									Ret	DNS	0
	(France) Tom Dillmann			Ret								0
	(France) Sébastien Ogier			Ret								0
	(Italy) Davide Roda					DSQ						0
	(Germany) Lukas Schreier			DNS								0
	(United States) William Peluchiwski									DNS	DNS	0
Pos.	Driver	CAT (Spain)	MON (Monaco)	RBR (Austria)	SIL (United Kingdom)	HOC (Germany)	HUN (Hungary)	SPA (Belgium)	MNZ (Italy)	COA (United States)		Points

Colour	Result
Gold	Winner
Silver	Second place
Bronze	Third place
Green	Points classification
Blue	Non-points classification
Blue	Non-classified finish (NC)
Purple	Retired, not classified (Ret)
Red	Did not qualify (DNQ)
Red	Did not pre-qualify (DNPQ)
Black	Disqualified (DSQ)
White	Did not start (DNS)
White	Withdrew (WD)
White	Race cancelled (C)
Blank	Did not practice (DNP)
Blank	Did not arrive (DNA)
Blank	Excluded (EX)

**Bold** – Pole
Italics – Fastest Lap

Rookie

† – Drivers did not finish the race, but were classified as they completed over 90% of the race distance.

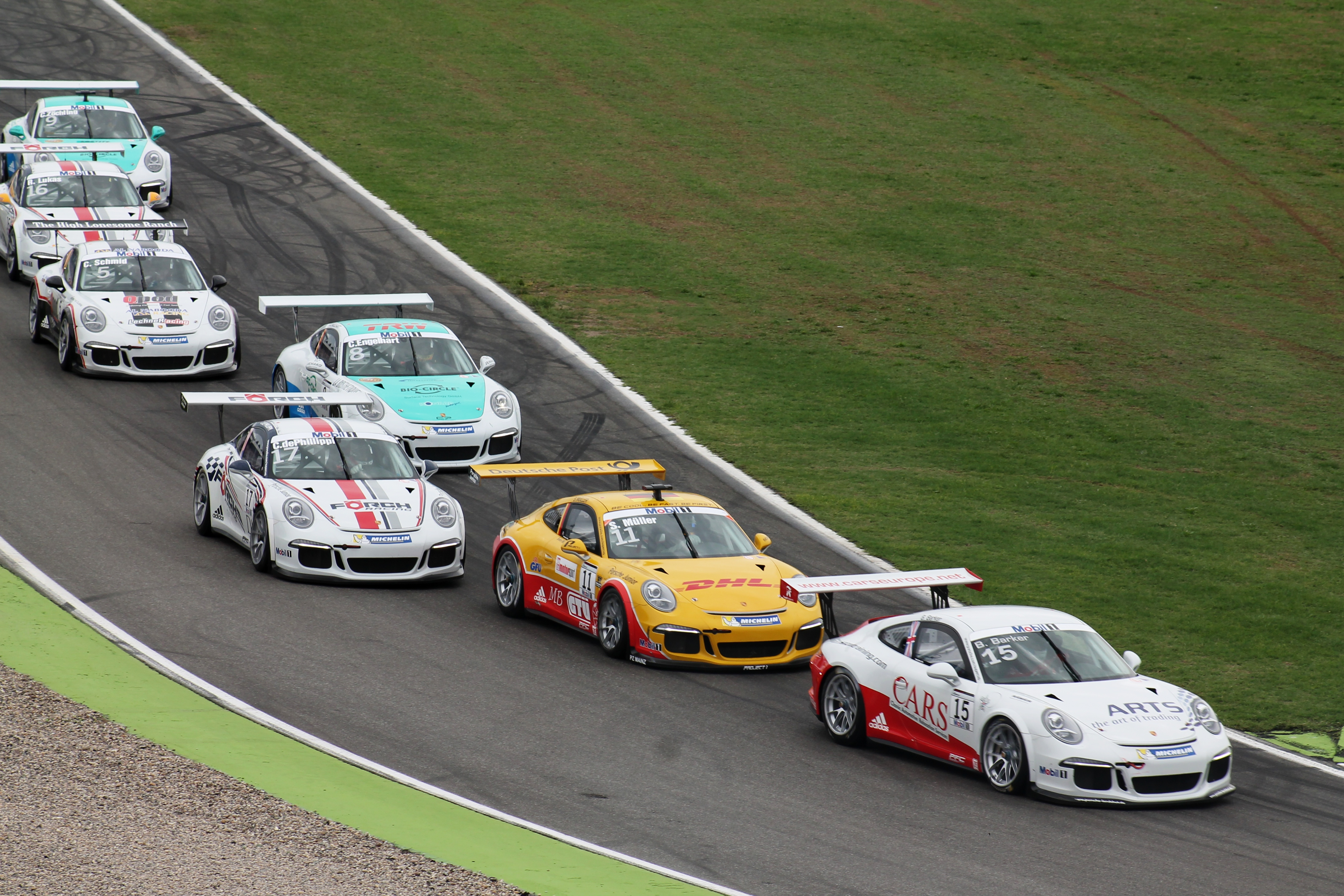
Porsche Supercup field at Hockenheimring.

=== Teams' Championship ===
Pos.	Team	Pts
1	(Austria) Verva Lechner Racing Team	244
2	(Austria) Walter Lechner Racing Team	232
3	(Germany) Team Project 1	208
4	(Germany) Konrad Motorsport	192
5	(Switzerland) FACH AUTO TECH	189
6	(Poland) FÖRCH Racing by Lukas Motorsport	132
7	(Germany) McGregor powered by Attempto Racing	100
8	(United States) MOMO-Megatron	41
