= Pepe Massot =

Spanish racing driver

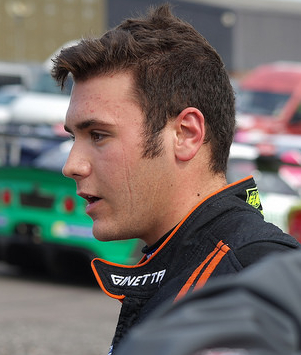
- Pepe Massot at Brands Hatch, 29 Mar 2014
- Nationality: (Spain) Spanish
- Born: Josep Massot Muntaner; 14 November 1995 (age 31) Barcelona (Catalunya, Spain)

Porsche Mobil1 Supercup career
- Debut season: 2015
- Current team: Momo Megatron Partrax
- Car number: TBA
- Starts: 0
- Wins: 0
- Poles: 0

Previous series
- 2012 2013 2014 2014 2014: Ginetta Junior Championship; Ginetta GT Supercup; Ginetta GT4 Supercup; Porsche Supercup; Porsche Carrera Cup Great Britain

Josep "Pepe" Massot Muntaner (born 14 November 1995) is a Spanish racing driver from Barcelona, Spain currently competing in the 2016 Porsche Supercup driving for Momo Megatron Team. In 2015 Pepe drives for Küs Team75 Bernhard.

Prior to racing in Germany, Massot's career from 2012 to 2014 was based in Great Britain in the various support series for the British Touring Car Championship including the Porsche Carrera Cup Great Britain, the Ginetta GT4 Supercup and the Ginetta Junior championship.

== Racing career ==
=== 2012 – Ginetta Juniors ===
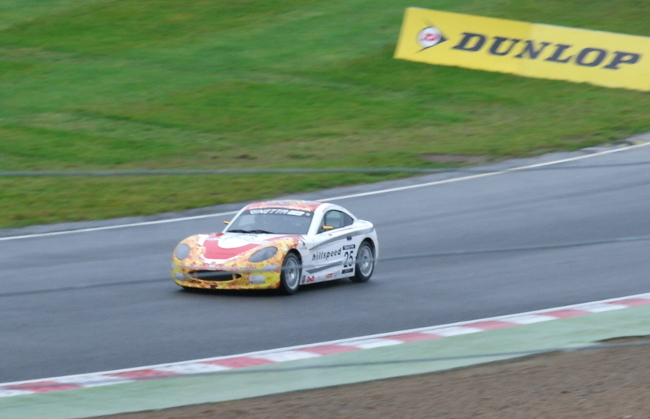
Pepe Massot in a Ginetta G40 at Brands Hatch, 21st Oct 2012

In 2012, Massot decided to try racing in the Ginetta Junior championship, initially with just the first two of the season's ten meetings.

Early success saw Massot able to commit to the full season with Hillspeed. He finished the season fourth overall helped by wins at Snetterton and Silverstone. There were other podium places won at Donington, Oulton Park, Croft, and Brands Hatch (GP circuit). His performances during the season saw him listed as one of the drivers of the season by Autosport.

=== 2013 – Ginetta GT Supercup ===
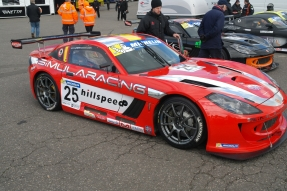
Pepe Massot, Ginetta G55, Brands Hatch, 31 Mar 2013

On 18 January 2013, Hillspeed announced they would be entering a car in the Ginetta GT Supercup for the first time, with Massot as the driver.

At the first meeting of the season at Brands Hatch Indy circuit, despite limited testing time in the more powerful G55 car, Massot managed to qualify fourth and in the weekend's three races finished, sixth, first and seventh.

The second meeting of the season was held over the weekend of 20 and 21 April at Donington Park. Massot finished fourth in round 4, sixth in round 5 and in the final sixth round, he scored his second win in the senior Ginetta series.

In the Snetterton and Knockhill meetings, Massot drove for the Century Motorsport team, moving then to the JHR Developments team for the rest of the season.

=== 2014 – Ginetta GT4 Supercup ===
For the renamed 2014 season, Massot remained with JHR Developments, with G55 cars now in full GT4 specifications. After an unsuccessful start to the season, in which he won just one race, Massot decided to leave the series in favour of the Porsche Carrera Cup Great Britain.

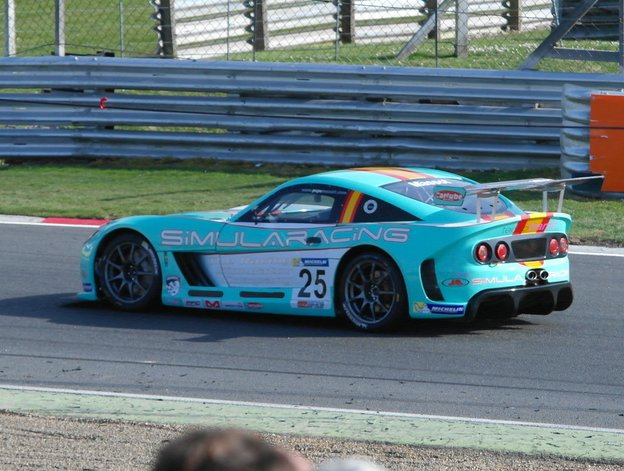
Pepe Massot's Ginetta G55 car for 2014

=== 2014 – Porsche Carrera Cup Great Britain ===
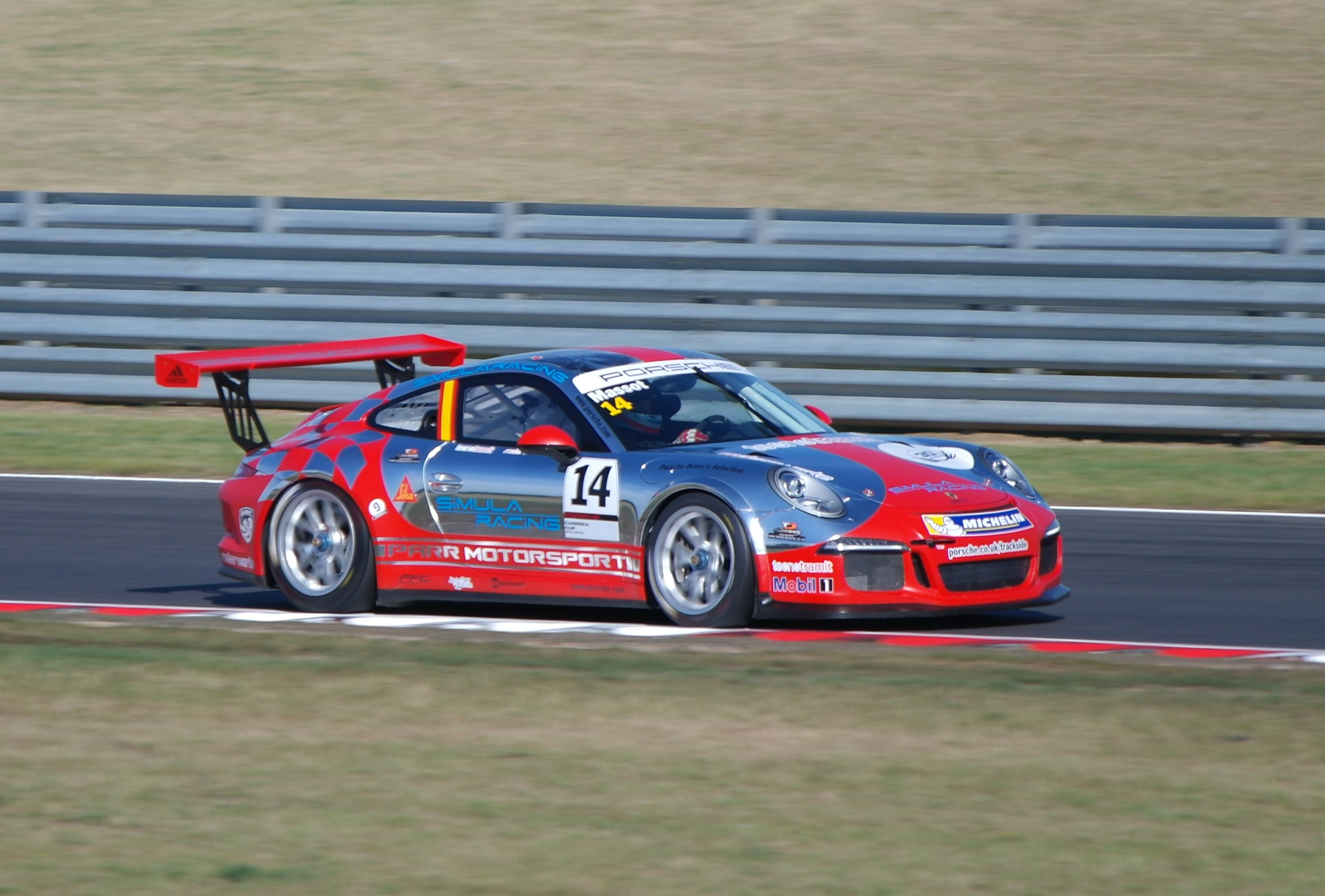
Massot in his Parr Motorsport Porsche 911 GT3 car at Snetterton in 2014

For the remainder of the season starting with round 5 at Croft, Massot competed in the Porsche Carrera Cup Great Britain driving with Parr Motorsport. Initially, he was placed in the Pro-Am1 class but following his performance at Croft, where he took a podium finish in his first meeting, he was re-evaluated as a Pro driver. He was to finish the season in fifth place with 135 points.

After the season finished, he made his début in the Porsche Supercup, driving for MOMO-Megatron at the Circuit of the Americas. It would not prove to be a successful début; a mechanical failure on Colin Thompson's car caused him to crash into Massot in the first race, forcing both drivers to retire.

=== 2015 – Porsche Carrera Cup Germany ===
2015 seen Massot compete in the Porsche Carrera Cup Germany for the Küs Team75 Bernhard squad alongside teammate Nicki Thiim, but retired on mid season due to a back injury.

=== 2016 – Porsche Mobil1 Supercup ===
After a long recovery Pepe goes back to the competition entering in rounds 7 & 9 -Spa and COTA- of the Porsche Mobil1 Supercup with Momo-Megatron Partrax Team.

== Racing record ==
=== Complete Porsche Supercup results ===
(key) (Races in bold indicate pole position) (Races in italics indicate fastest lap)

Year	Team	1	2	3	4	5	6	7	8	9	10	DC	Points
2014	MOMO-Megatron	ESP	MON	AUT	GBR	GER	HUN	BEL	ITA	USA; Ret	USA; DNS	NC	0
2016	MOMO Megatron Team PARTRAX	ESP	MON	AUT	GBR	HUN	GER	BEL; 11	ITA	USA; 12	USA; 19	17th	15
