= 2017 International GT Open =

Motor racing competition

The 2017 International GT Open season was the twelfth season of the International GT Open, the grand tourer-style sports car racing founded in 2006 by the Spanish GT Sport Organización. It began on 29 April at Autódromo do Estoril and finished on 29 October, at Barcelona after seven double-header meetings.

== Entry list ==
Team	Car	No.	Driver	Class	Rounds
(Italy) Solaris Motorsport	Aston Martin V12 Vantage GT3	007	(Switzerland) Mauro Calamia	P	1–3, 5
(Italy) Solaris Motorsport	Aston Martin V12 Vantage GT3	007	(Italy) Francesco Sini	P	1–3, 5
(Italy) Imperiale Racing	Lamborghini Huracán GT3	1	(Italy) Thomas Biagi	P	All
(Italy) Imperiale Racing	Lamborghini Huracán GT3	1	(Italy) Giovanni Venturini	P	1–4
(Italy) Imperiale Racing	Lamborghini Huracán GT3	1	(Italy) Raffaele Giammaria	P	5–7
(Italy) Imperiale Racing	Lamborghini Huracán GT3	23	(Italy) Vito Postiglione	P	All
(Italy) Imperiale Racing	Lamborghini Huracán GT3	23	(Italy) Andrea Fontana	P	1–6
(Italy) Imperiale Racing	Lamborghini Huracán GT3	23	(Germany) Christian Engelhart	P	7
(Italy) Imperiale Racing	Lamborghini Huracán GT3	63	(Italy) Marco Mapelli	P	5–7
(Italy) Imperiale Racing	Lamborghini Huracán GT3	63	(Italy) Giovanni Venturini	P	5–7
(China) SF Racing	Ferrari 488 GT3	5	(Italy) Andrea Caldarelli	PA	2–3, 7
(China) SF Racing	Ferrari 488 GT3	5	(China) Fu Songyang	PA	2–3, 7
(China) SF Racing	Ferrari 488 GT3	5	(Italy) Rino Mastronardi	Am	4
(China) SF Racing	Ferrari 488 GT3	5	(Italy) Gabriele Lancieri	Am	6
(China) SF Racing	Ferrari 488 GT3	5	(China) Fu Songyang	Am	4, 6
(Italy) AF Corse	Ferrari 488 GT3	8	(Italy) Piergiuseppe Perazzini	PA	All
(Italy) AF Corse	Ferrari 488 GT3	8	(Italy) Marco Cioci	PA	1–5, 7
(Italy) AF Corse	Ferrari 488 GT3	8	(Republic of Ireland) Matt Griffin	PA	6
(United Kingdom) Jordan Racing	Bentley Continental GT3	10	(United Kingdom) Michael Meadows	PA	1–3, 5, 7
(United Kingdom) Jordan Racing	Bentley Continental GT3	10	(United Kingdom) Jordan Witt	PA	1–3, 5, 7
(Italy) Ratón Racing	Lamborghini Huracán GT3	11	(Italy) Edoardo Liberati	P	1–6
(Italy) Ratón Racing	Lamborghini Huracán GT3	11	(China) Kang Ling	P	1–6
(Portugal) Sports and You	Mercedes-AMG GT3	12	(Brazil) Marcio Basso	Am	All
(Portugal) Sports and You	Mercedes-AMG GT3	12	(Brazil) Nonô Figueiredo	Am	1–2, 5–7
(Portugal) Sports and You	Mercedes-AMG GT3	12	(Argentina) José Manuel Balbiani	Am	3–4
(Portugal) Sports and You	Mercedes-AMG GT3	99	(Portugal) "Manuel da Costa" (Note: António Coimbra sometimes uses pseudonym "Manuel da Costa".)	Am	All
(Portugal) Sports and You	Mercedes-AMG GT3	99	(Portugal) "Miguel Sardinha" (Note: Luís Silva sometimes uses pseudonym "Miguel Sardinha".)	Am	All
(Spain) Drivex School	Mercedes-AMG GT3	16	(Brazil) Marcelo Hahn	PA	All
(Spain) Drivex School	Mercedes-AMG GT3	16	(Brazil) Allam Khodair	PA	1–2, 5, 7
(Spain) Drivex School	Mercedes-AMG GT3	16	(Brazil) Alan Hellmeister	PA	3–4, 6
(Czech Republic) Senkyr Motorsport	BMW M6 GT3	17	(Slovakia) Richard Gonda		7
(Czech Republic) Senkyr Motorsport	BMW M6 GT3	17	(Czech Republic) Jakub Knoll		7
(Austria) Lechner Racing	Mercedes-AMG GT3	19	(Germany) Thomas Jäger	PA	3–4
(Austria) Lechner Racing	Mercedes-AMG GT3	19	(Austria) Mario Plachutta	PA	3–4
(Germany) SPS Automotive Performance	Mercedes-AMG GT3	20	(Germany) Valentin Pierburg	PA	All
(Germany) SPS Automotive Performance	Mercedes-AMG GT3	20	(United Kingdom) Tom Onslow-Cole	PA	1, 3, 5–7
(Germany) SPS Automotive Performance	Mercedes-AMG GT3	20	(Netherlands) Jules Szymkowiak	PA	2
(Germany) SPS Automotive Performance	Mercedes-AMG GT3	20	(Germany) Lance David Arnold	PA	4
(Germany) SPS Automotive Performance	Mercedes-AMG GT3	40	(Switzerland) Mauro Calamia	P	6
(Germany) SPS Automotive Performance	Mercedes-AMG GT3	40	(Switzerland) Roberto Pampanini	P	6
(Germany) Konrad Motorsport	Lamborghini Huracán GT3	21	(Germany) Paul Scheuschner	PA	3–4, 6–7
(Germany) Konrad Motorsport	Lamborghini Huracán GT3	21	(Germany) Hendrik Still	PA	3–4, 6–7
(United Kingdom) Balfe Motorsport	McLaren 650S GT3	22	(United Kingdom) Shaun Balfe	PA	All
(United Kingdom) Balfe Motorsport	McLaren 650S GT3	22	(United Kingdom) Rob Bell	PA	All
(United Kingdom) Garage 59	McLaren 650S GT3	24	(United Kingdom) Michael Benham	PA	1–4, 6–7
(United Kingdom) Garage 59	McLaren 650S GT3	24	(United Kingdom) Duncan Tappy	PA	1–4, 6–7
(United Kingdom) Garage 59	McLaren 650S GT3	88	(France) Côme Ledogar	PA	All
(United Kingdom) Garage 59	McLaren 650S GT3	88	(Sweden) Alexander West	PA	All
(United Kingdom) FF Corse	Ferrari 488 GT3	25	(United Kingdom) Ivor Dunbar	PA	1–5, 7
(United Kingdom) FF Corse	Ferrari 488 GT3	25	(United Kingdom) Johnny Mowlem	PA	1–5, 7
(Poland) Förch Racing by Lukas Motorsport	Porsche 911 GT3 R	29	(Croatia) Željko Drmić	PA	6
(Poland) Förch Racing by Lukas Motorsport	Porsche 911 GT3 R	29	(Poland) Robert Lukas	PA	6
(United Kingdom) Lee Mowle	Mercedes-AMG GT3	30	(United Kingdom) Ryan Ratcliffe	P	5
(United Kingdom) Lee Mowle	Mercedes-AMG GT3	30	(United Kingdom) Phil Keen	P	5
(Italy) Antonelli Motorsport	Lamborghini Huracán GT3	32	(Italy) Kikko Galbiati	P	3
(Italy) Antonelli Motorsport	Lamborghini Huracán GT3	32	(Canada) Mikaël Grenier	P	3
(Italy) Antonelli Motorsport	Lamborghini Huracán GT3	33	(Italy) Gianluca Giraudi	Am	3
(Italy) Antonelli Motorsport	Lamborghini Huracán GT3	33	(Italy) Davide Roda	Am	3
(United Kingdom) Wessex Vehicles	Lamborghini Gallardo R-EX GT3	39	(United Kingdom) Craig Dolby	P	2, 5–7
(United Kingdom) Wessex Vehicles	Lamborghini Gallardo R-EX GT3	39	(Czech Republic) Tomáš Enge	P	2
(United Kingdom) Wessex Vehicles	Lamborghini Gallardo R-EX GT3	39	(United Kingdom) Riki Christodoulou	P	5
(United Kingdom) Wessex Vehicles	Lamborghini Gallardo R-EX GT3	39	(United Kingdom) Seb Morris	P	6–7
(France) AB Sport Auto	Lamborghini Huracán GT3	46	(France) Joffrey de Narda	PA	3
(France) AB Sport Auto	Lamborghini Huracán GT3	46	(France) Harry Teneketzian	PA	3
(Switzerland) Kaspersky Motorsport	Ferrari 488 GT3	48	(Russia) Aleksandr Moiseev	Am	2–6
(Switzerland) Kaspersky Motorsport	Ferrari 488 GT3	48	(Italy) Davide Rizzo	Am	2–6
(Spain) BMW Team Teo Martín	BMW M6 GT3	51	(Portugal) Lourenço Beirão da Veiga	P	All
(Spain) BMW Team Teo Martín	BMW M6 GT3	51	(Portugal) António Félix da Costa	P	1, 5, 7
(Spain) BMW Team Teo Martín	BMW M6 GT3	51	(Brazil) Nelson Piquet Jr.	P	2
(Spain) BMW Team Teo Martín	BMW M6 GT3	51	(Brazil) Augusto Farfus	P	3, 6
(Spain) BMW Team Teo Martín	BMW M6 GT3	51	(Portugal) Tiago Monteiro	P	4
(Spain) BMW Team Teo Martín	BMW M6 GT3	62	(Portugal) Filipe Barreiros	Am	1
(Spain) BMW Team Teo Martín	BMW M6 GT3	62	(Portugal) Francisco Guedes	Am	1
(Spain) BMW Team Teo Martín	BMW M6 GT3	65	(Sweden) Victor Bouveng	P	All
(Spain) BMW Team Teo Martín	BMW M6 GT3	65	(Spain) Fran Rueda	P	All
(Switzerland) Emil Frey Lexus Racing	Lexus RC F GT3	54	(Spain) Albert Costa	P	All
(Switzerland) Emil Frey Lexus Racing	Lexus RC F GT3	54	(Switzerland) Philipp Frommenwiler	P	All
(Germany) Farnbacher Racing	Lexus RC F GT3	55	(Germany) Dominik Farnbacher	P	All
(Germany) Farnbacher Racing	Lexus RC F GT3	55	(Germany) Mario Farnbacher	P	1–3, 5–7
(Germany) Farnbacher Racing	Lexus RC F GT3	55	(Austria) Norbert Siedler	P	4
(Austria) MS Racing	Mercedes-AMG GT3	74	(Austria) Alexander Hrachowina	Am	1–6
(Austria) MS Racing	Mercedes-AMG GT3	74	(Austria) Martin Konrad	Am	1–6
(Belgium) Aston Martin Brussels Racing	Aston Martin V12 Vantage GT3	90	(Belgium) Tim Verbergt	P	2
(Belgium) Aston Martin Brussels Racing	Aston Martin V12 Vantage GT3	90	(Belgium) Sam Dejonghe	P	2
(United Kingdom) Optimum Motorsport	Audi R8 LMS	96	(United Kingdom) Bradley Ellis	PA	7
(United Kingdom) Optimum Motorsport	Audi R8 LMS	96	(United Kingdom) Oliver Wilkinson	PA	7
(Slovakia) Racing Trevor	BMW M6 GT3	124	(Slovakia) Christian Malchárek	PA	4
(Slovakia) Racing Trevor	BMW M6 GT3	124	(Slovakia) Jirí Malchárek	PA	4
(Germany) Rinaldi Racing	Ferrari 488 GT3	333	(Russia) Sergey Borisov	Am	7
(Germany) Rinaldi Racing	Ferrari 488 GT3	333	(Russia) Rinat Salikhov	Am	7
(Switzerland) Spirit of Race	Ferrari 488 GT3	488	(Denmark) Mikkel Mac	P	All
(Switzerland) Spirit of Race	Ferrari 488 GT3	488	(Portugal) Miguel Ramos	P	All
(China) FFF Racing Team by ACM	Lamborghini Huracán GT3	555	(Japan) Hiroshi Hamaguchi	PA	All
(China) FFF Racing Team by ACM	Lamborghini Huracán GT3	555	(Italy) Vitantonio Liuzzi	PA	All

Icon	Class
P	Pro Cup
PA	Pro-Am Cup
Am	Am Cup

== Race calendar ==
A seven-round provisional calendar was revealed on 4 October 2016. The Hungaroring round will be co-headlined by the TCR International Series. Bold indicates overall winner.

Round		Circuit	Date	Pole position	Pro Winner	Pro-Am Winner	Am Winner
1	R1	(Portugal) Autódromo Fernanda Pires da Silva	29 April	(United Kingdom) No. 22 Balfe Motorsport	**(Switzerland) No. 54 Emil Frey Lexus Racing**	(United Kingdom) No. 22 Balfe Motorsport	(Portugal) No. 12 Sports and You
1	R1	(Portugal) Autódromo Fernanda Pires da Silva	29 April	(United Kingdom) Shaun Balfe (United Kingdom) Rob Bell	**(Spain) Albert Costa** **(Switzerland) Philipp Frommenwiler**	(United Kingdom) Shaun Balfe (United Kingdom) Rob Bell	(Brazil) Marcio Basso (Brazil) Nonô Figueiredo
1	R2	(Portugal) Autódromo Fernanda Pires da Silva	30 April	(United Kingdom) No. 24 Garage 59	**(Germany) No. 55 Farnbacher Racing**	(United Kingdom) No. 24 Garage 59	(Austria) No. 74 MS Racing
1	R2	(Portugal) Autódromo Fernanda Pires da Silva	30 April	(United Kingdom) Michael Benham (United Kingdom) Duncan Tappy	**(Germany) Dominik Farnbacher** **(Germany) Mario Farnbacher**	(United Kingdom) Michael Benham (United Kingdom) Duncan Tappy	(Austria) Alexander Hrachowina (Austria) Martin Konrad
2	R1	(Belgium) Circuit de Spa-Francorchamps	27 May	(Switzerland) No. 54 Emil Frey Lexus Racing	**(Switzerland) No. 54 Emil Frey Lexus Racing**	(United Kingdom) No. 10 Jordan Racing	(Switzerland) No. 48 Kaspersky Motorsport
2	R1	(Belgium) Circuit de Spa-Francorchamps	27 May	(Spain) Albert Costa (Switzerland) Philipp Frommenwiler	**(Spain) Albert Costa** **(Switzerland) Philipp Frommenwiler**	(United Kingdom) Michael Meadows (United Kingdom) Jordan Witt	(Russia) Aleksandr Moiseev (Italy) Davide Rizzo
2	R2	(Belgium) Circuit de Spa-Francorchamps	28 May	(Italy) No. 23 Imperiale Racing	**(Germany) No. 55 Farnbacher Racing**	(Italy) No. 8 AF Corse	(Switzerland) No. 48 Kaspersky Motorsport
2	R2	(Belgium) Circuit de Spa-Francorchamps	28 May	(Italy) Andrea Fontana (Italy) Vito Postiglione	**(Germany) Dominik Farnbacher** **(Germany) Mario Farnbacher**	(Italy) Marco Cioci (Italy) Piergiuseppe Perazzini	(Russia) Aleksandr Moiseev (Italy) Davide Rizzo
3	R1	(France) Circuit Paul Ricard	10 June	(Switzerland) No. 488 Spirit of Race	**(Switzerland) No. 488 Spirit of Race**	(Germany) No. 20 SPS Automotive Performance	(Switzerland) No. 48 Kaspersky Motorsport
3	R1	(France) Circuit Paul Ricard	10 June	(Denmark) Mikkel Mac (Portugal) Miguel Ramos	**(Denmark) Mikkel Mac** **(Portugal) Miguel Ramos**	(United Kingdom) Tom Onslow-Cole (Germany) Valentin Pierburg	(Russia) Aleksandr Moiseev (Italy) Davide Rizzo
3	R2	(France) Circuit Paul Ricard	11 June	(China) No. 5 SF Racing	**(Spain) No. 65 BMW Team Teo Martín**	(Spain) No. 16 Drivex School	(Switzerland) No. 48 Kaspersky Motorsport
3	R2	(France) Circuit Paul Ricard	11 June	(Italy) Andrea Caldarelli (China) Fu Songyang	**(Sweden) Victor Bouveng** **(Spain) Fran Rueda**	(Brazil) Marcelo Hahn (Brazil) Alan Hellmeister	(Russia) Aleksandr Moiseev (Italy) Davide Rizzo
4	R1	(Hungary) Hungaroring	1 July	(Switzerland) No. 488 Spirit of Race	**(Italy) No. 1 Imperiale Racing**	(Germany) No. 20 SPS Automotive Performance	(Austria) No. 74 MS Racing
4	R1	(Hungary) Hungaroring	1 July	(Denmark) Mikkel Mac (Portugal) Miguel Ramos	**(Italy) Thomas Biagi** **(Italy) Giovanni Venturini**	(Germany) Lance David Arnold (Germany) Valentin Pierburg	(Austria) Alexander Hrachowina (Austria) Martin Konrad
4	R2	(Hungary) Hungaroring	2 July	(Spain) No. 65 BMW Team Teo Martín	**(Spain) No. 65 BMW Team Teo Martín**	(United Kingdom) No. 88 Garage 59	(Portugal) No. 99 Sports and You
4	R2	(Hungary) Hungaroring	2 July	(Sweden) Victor Bouveng (Spain) Fran Rueda	**(Sweden) Victor Bouveng** **(Spain) Fran Rueda**	(France) Côme Ledogar (Sweden) Alexander West	(Portugal) António Coimbra (Portugal) Luís Silva
5	R1	(United Kingdom) Silverstone Circuit	2 September	(Switzerland) No. 54 Emil Frey Lexus Racing	**(Switzerland) No. 54 Emil Frey Lexus Racing**	(United Kingdom) No. 22 Balfe Motorsport	(Portugal) No. 99 Sports and You
5	R1	(United Kingdom) Silverstone Circuit	2 September	(Spain) Albert Costa (Switzerland) Philipp Frommenwiler	**(Spain) Albert Costa** **(Switzerland) Philipp Frommenwiler**	(United Kingdom) Shaun Balfe (United Kingdom) Rob Bell	(Portugal) "Manuel da Costa" (Portugal) "Miguel Sardinha"
5	R2	(United Kingdom) Silverstone Circuit	3 September	(Spain) No. 65 BMW Team Teo Martín	**(Spain) No. 51 BMW Team Teo Martín**	(United Kingdom) No. 10 Jordan Racing	(Switzerland) No. 48 Kaspersky Motorsport
5	R2	(United Kingdom) Silverstone Circuit	3 September	(Sweden) Victor Bouveng (Spain) Fran Rueda	**(Portugal) Lourenço Beirão da Veiga** **(Portugal) António Félix da Costa**	(United Kingdom) Michael Meadows (United Kingdom) Jordan Witt	(Russia) Aleksandr Moiseev (Italy) Davide Rizzo
6	R1	(Italy) Autodromo Nazionale Monza	30 September	(United Kingdom) No. 22 Balfe Motorsport	**(United Kingdom) No. 39 Wessex Vehicles**	(United Kingdom) No. 22 Balfe Motorsport	(Portugal) No. 99 Sports and You
6	R1	(Italy) Autodromo Nazionale Monza	30 September	(United Kingdom) Shaun Balfe (United Kingdom) Rob Bell	**(United Kingdom) Craig Dolby** **(United Kingdom) Seb Morris**	(United Kingdom) Shaun Balfe (United Kingdom) Rob Bell	(Portugal) António Coimbra (Portugal) Luís Silva
6	R2	(Italy) Autodromo Nazionale Monza	1 October	(Spain) No. 51 BMW Team Teo Martín	**(Spain) No. 51 BMW Team Teo Martín**	(United Kingdom) No. 88 Garage 59	(Portugal) No. 99 Sports and You
6	R2	(Italy) Autodromo Nazionale Monza	1 October	(Portugal) Lourenço Beirão da Veiga (Brazil) Augusto Farfus	**(Portugal) Lourenço Beirão da Veiga** **(Brazil) Augusto Farfus**	(France) Côme Ledogar (Sweden) Alexander West	(Portugal) António Coimbra (Portugal) Luís Silva
7	R1	(Spain) Circuit de Barcelona-Catalunya	28 October	(Switzerland) No. 54 Emil Frey Lexus Racing	**(Italy) No. 63 Imperiale Racing**	(China) No. 5 SF Racing	(Portugal) No. 12 Sports and You
7	R1	(Spain) Circuit de Barcelona-Catalunya	28 October	(Spain) Albert Costa (Switzerland) Philipp Frommenwiler	**(Italy) Marco Mapelli** **(Italy) Giovanni Venturini**	(Italy) Andrea Caldarelli (China) Fu Songyang	(Brazil) Marcio Basso (Brazil) Nonô Figueiredo
7	R2	(Spain) Circuit de Barcelona-Catalunya	29 October	(Spain) No. 51 BMW Team Teo Martín	(Switzerland) **No. 54 Emil Frey Lexus Racing**	(United Kingdom) No. 10 Jordan Racing	(Germany) No. 333 Rinaldi Racing
7	R2	(Spain) Circuit de Barcelona-Catalunya	29 October	(Portugal) Lourenço Beirão da Veiga (Portugal) António Félix da Costa	**(Spain) Albert Costa** **(Switzerland) Philipp Frommenwiler**	(United Kingdom) Michael Meadows (United Kingdom) Jordan Witt	(Russia) Sergey Borisov (Russia) Rinat Salikhov

== Standings ==
=== Drivers' Championship ===
Pos.	Drivers	Points
1	(Italy) Giovanni Venturini	114
2	(Spain) Fran Rueda (Sweden) Victor Bouveng	106
3	(Spain) Albert Costa (Switzerland) Philipp Frommenwiler	98
4	(Italy) Thomas Biagi	92
5	(Portugal) Miguel Ramos (Denmark) Mikkel Mac	90
6	(Germany) Dominik Farnbacher	77
7	(Portugal) Lourenço Beirão da Veiga	70

=== Teams' Championship ===
Pos.	Team	Points
1	(Italy) Imperiale Racing	100
2	(Spain) BMW Team Teo Martín	98
3	(Switzerland) Emil Frey Lexus	57
4	(Switzerland) Spirit of Race	50
5	(Germany) Farnbacher Racing	45
6	(United Kingdom) Garage 59	26
7	(United Kingdom) Balfe Motorsport	24
