= Philipp Frommenwiler =

Swiss racing driver (born 1989)

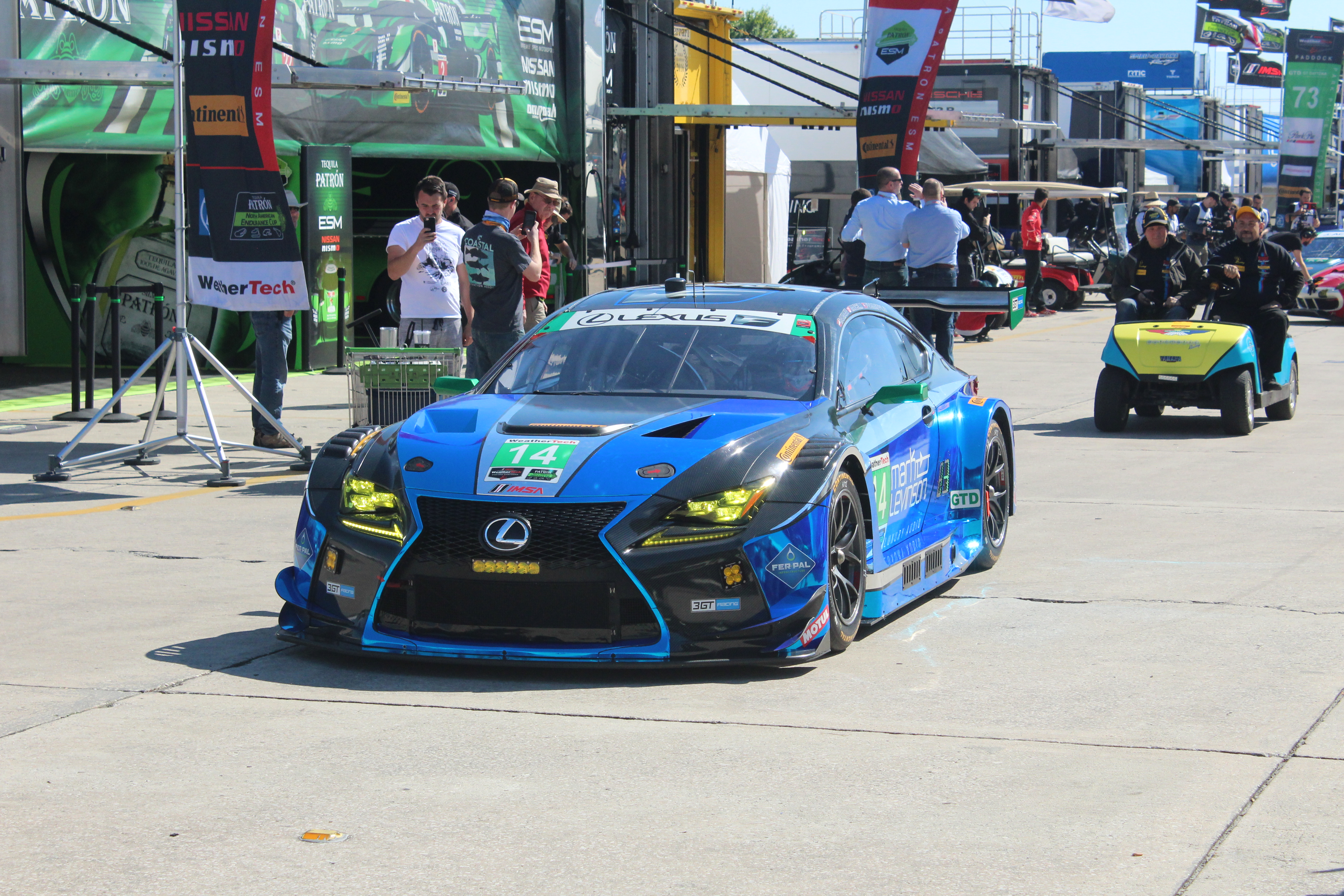
- Frommenwiler in 2018
- Nationality: (Switzerland) Swiss
- Born: 27 August 1989 (age 37) Kreuzlingen, Switzerland
- Categorisation: FIA Silver

Philipp Frommenwiler (born 27 August 1989) is a Swiss racing driver who competes in the Porsche Endurance Trophy Nürburgring for BSL Racing Team. He was third overall in his only International GT Open season in 2017 for Emil Frey Lexus Racing, and is also an ADAC GT Masters race winner.

== Career ==
Frommenwiler began his single-seater in 2008, finishing runner-up in Formula Lista Junior for Equipe Bernoise. A year in Formula Palmer Audi then ensued, before Frommenwiler switched to SEAT León Supercopa Germany in 2010, scoring a lone win at the Lausitzring to end the year ninth in points.

Switching to Porsche Carrera Cup Germany with Attempto Racing in 2011, Frommenwiler scored a best result of eighth at the Nürburgring to end the season 14th in points, in a season in which he also raced at the inaugural Porsche Carrera World Cup. Returning to the team for 2012, Frommenwiler jumped to ninth in the overall standings with a best result of fourth at the Norisring, as well as making his Porsche Supercup debut for Antonelli Motorsport.

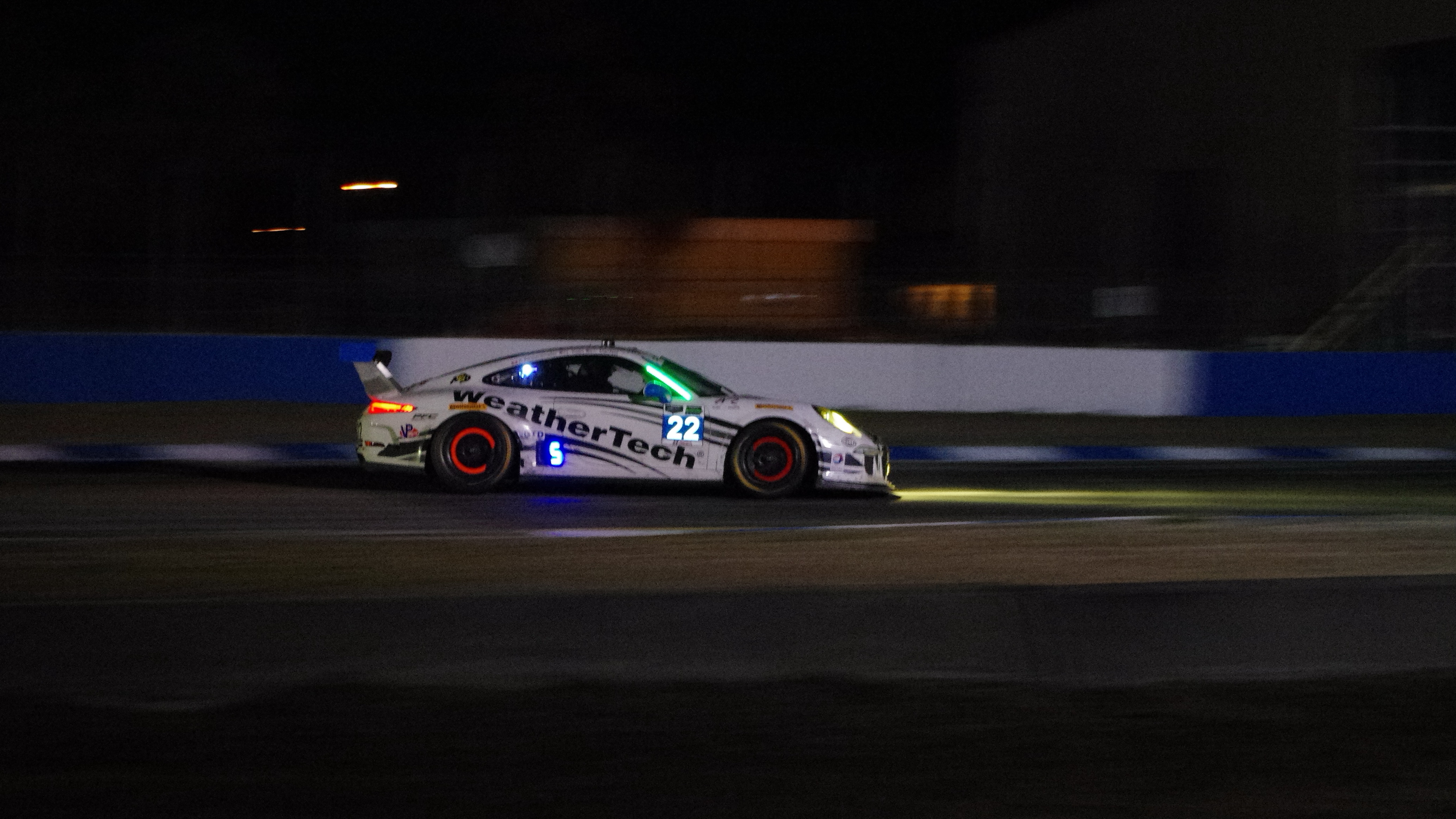
Frommenwiler drove his Alex Job Racing Porsche to fourth at the 2014 12 Hours of Sebring.

In 2013, Frommenwiler graduated to ADAC GT Masters to race a Porsche 911 GT3 R for Farnbacher Racing alongside Mario Farnbacher. Starting the season off with a double podium at Oschersleben, the pair only added one more podium to their tally at the Red Bull Ring as they settled for 12th in points. Frommenwiler also made his 24 Hours of Nürburgring debut with Farnbacher in the premier SP9 class. Partnering Sebastian Asch in 2014, Frommenwiler slipped to 25th in the ADAC GT Masters with a best result of fourth at Lausitzring and Sachsenring. That year, Frommenwiler also finished fourth in GTD on his United SportsCar Championship debut for Alex Job Racing at the 12 Hours of Sebring, as well as joining Manthey Racing at the 24 Hours of Nürburgring and Fach Auto Tech at the 24 Hours of Spa.

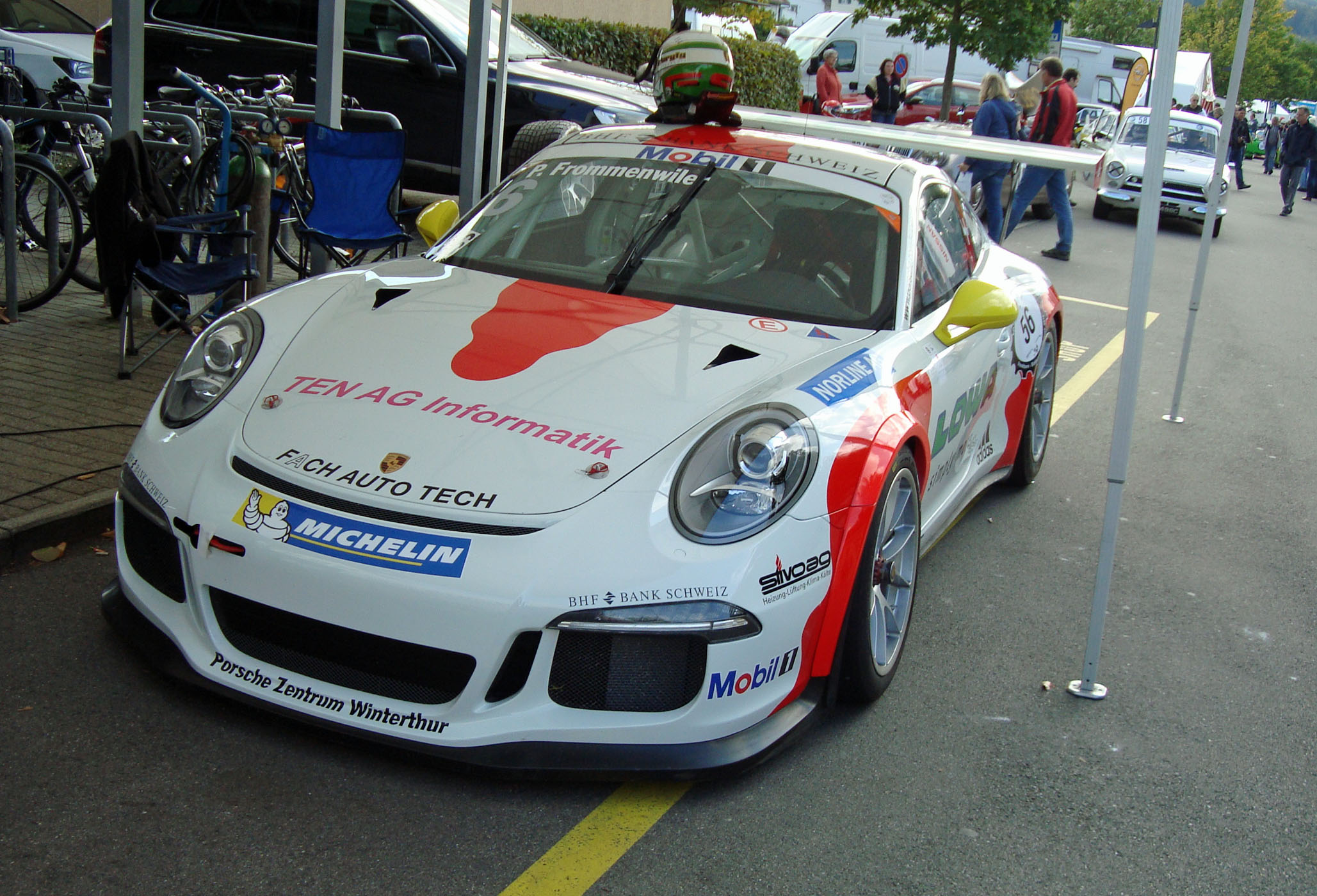
The car Frommenwiler raced for Fach Auto Tech in Porsche Supercup in 2015.

Two years in Porsche Supercup at Fach Auto Tech then followed, as Frommenwiler placed 14th and 8th overall with a best result of fifth at the Hungaroring in 2016. He returned to GT3 competition in 2017, joining Emil Frey Lexus Racing to race in International GT Open. Driving alongside Albert Costa, Frommenwiler won four times across Estoril, Spa, Silverstone and Barcelona to end the year third overall. In 2018, Frommenwiler was the endurance driver for Lexus-fielding 3GT Racing in the IMSA SportsCar Championship, and made cameos in the ADAC GT Masters for Honda Team Schubert Motorsport, and the Blancpain GT Series Endurance Cup for Audi-fielding Aust Motorsport.

In 2019, Frommenwiler drove a Honda NSX GT3 for Jenson Button's Team Rocket RJN team in the Blancpain GT Series Endurance Cup, a season in which he and Matt McMurry finished eighth in the Silver Cup standings. In parallel, Frommenwiler made two IMSA starts in a Lexus RC F GT3 for AIM Vasser Sullivan, notably taking fifth in GTD at the 6 Hours of The Glen. In 2020, Frommenwiler returned to the ADAC GT Masters with Schütz Motorsport. Sharing a Mercedes-AMG GT3 Evo with Marvin Dienst, Frommenwiler took a lone win from pole at the Sachsenring as he ended the year 20th in the overall standings.

Five years later, Frommenwiler returned to racing, making select appearances in Porsche Sprint Challenge Scandinavia and the Porsche Endurance Trophy Nürburgring. In 2026, Frommenwiler joined BSL Racing Team to race in the latter, as well as returning to the 24 Hours of Nürburgring in the Cup 3 class.

== Karting record ==
=== Karting career summary ===
Season	Series	Team	Position
2007	LO Swiss Super Rok Cup		

== Racing record ==
=== Racing career summary ===
Season	Series	Team	Races	Wins	Poles	F/Laps	Podiums	Points	Position
2008	Formula Lista Junior	Equipe Bernoise	12	4	2	1	5	123	**2nd**
2008	ADAC Formel Masters	Zettl Motorsport	1	0	0	0	0	1	23rd
2009	Formula Palmer Audi	MotorSport Vision	17	0	0	0	0	149	13th
2010	SEAT León Supercopa Germany		15	1	0	0	1	60	9th
2011	Porsche Carrera Cup Germany	Hermes Attempto Racing	9	0	0	0	0	37	14th
2011	Porsche Carrera World Cup	Hermes Attempto Racing	1	0	0	0	0	—N/a	17th
2011	ADAC GT Masters	Hegersport	0	0	0	0	0	0	NC
2012	Porsche Carrera Cup Germany	Hermes Attempto Racing	17	0	0	0	0	113	9th
2012	Porsche Supercup	Antonelli Motorsport	1	0	0	0	0	0	NC†
2012	City Challenge Baku	Attempto Racing	0	0	0	0	0	—N/a	WD
2013	ADAC GT Masters	Farnbacher Racing	16	0	0	0	3	84	12th
2013	24 Hours of Nürburgring – SP9	Farnbacher Racing	1	0	0	0	0	—N/a	DNF
2014	United SportsCar Championship – GTD	Alex Job Racing	2	0	0	0	0	49	45th
2014	ADAC GT Masters	Farnbacher Racing	16	0	0	0	0	35	25th
2014	Blancpain Sprint Series – Pro	Farnbacher Racing	0	0	0	0	0	0	NC
2014	24 Hours of Nürburgring – SP9	Manthey Racing	1	0	0	0	0	—N/a	15th
2014	Blancpain Endurance Series – Pro-Am	Fach Auto Tech	1	0	0	0	0	0	NC
2014	Porsche Supercup	Fach Auto Tech	2	0	0	0	0	3	22nd
2015	Porsche Carrera Cup Germany	Konrad Motorsport	4	0	0	0	0	15	20th
2015	Porsche Supercup	Fach Auto Tech	10	0	0	0	0	40	14th
2015	24 Hours of Nürburgring – SP9	Team Premio	1	0	0	0	0	—N/a	10th
2016	Porsche Supercup	Fach Auto Tech	10	0	0	0	0	67	8th
2017	International GT Open	Emil Frey Lexus Racing	14	4	0	0	7	98	**3rd**
2018	24H GT Series – 991	Fach Auto Tech	1	0	0	0	0	24	NC
2018	IMSA SportsCar Championship – GTD	3GT Racing	3	0	0	0	0	53	39th
2018	24 Hours of Nürburgring – SP9	Manthey Racing	1	0	0	0	0	—N/a	17th
2018	ADAC GT Masters	Honda Team Schubert Motorsport	2	0	0	0	0	0	NC
2018	Blancpain GT Series Endurance Cup	Aust Motorsport	1	0	0	0	0	0	NC
2018	Blancpain GT Series Endurance Cup – Silver	Aust Motorsport	1	0	0	0	0	5	20th
2019	IMSA SportsCar Championship – GTD	AIM Vasser Sullivan	2	0	0	0	0	42	40th
2019	Blancpain GT Series Endurance Cup	Jenson Team Rocket RJN	5	0	0	0	0	0	NC
2019	Blancpain GT Series Endurance Cup – Silver	Jenson Team Rocket RJN	5	0	0	0	0	44	8th
2019	Intercontinental GT Challenge	Jenson Team Rocket RJN	1	0	0	0	0	0	NC
2020	ADAC GT Masters	Schütz Motorsport	13	1	1	0	1	53	20th
2025	Porsche Sprint Challenge Scandinavia	Prido	4	2	2	3	4	40	13th
2025	Porsche Endurance Trophy Nürburgring – CUP3	BSL Racing Team	2	0	0	0	0	4	NC
2026	Porsche Endurance Trophy Nürburgring – CUP3	BSL Racing Team	1	0	0	0	0	0*	NC*
2026	24 Hours of Nürburgring – Cup 3	BSL Racing Team	1	0	0	0	0	—N/a	DNF

* Season still in progress.

^{†} As Frommenwiler was a guest driver, he was ineligible for points.

=== Complete Porsche Carrera Cup Germany results ===
(key) (Races in bold indicate pole position) (Races in italics indicate fastest lap)

Year	Team	1	2	3	4	5	6	7	8	9	10	11	12	13	14	15	16	17	DC	Points
2011	Hermes Attempto Racing	HOC1; 9	ZAN; 12	RBR; Ret	LAU; 9	NNS; 8	NOR; 11	NÜR; 17	OSC; 12	HOC2; 16									14th	37
2012	Hermes Attempto Racing	HOC1; 1 Ret	HOC1; 2; 11	LAU; 1; 11	LAU; 2; 8	NNS; 10	RBR; 1; 7	RBR; 2; 13	NOR; 1; 4	NOR; 2; 5	NÜR; 1; 7	NÜR; 2; 6	ZAN; 1 Ret	ZAN; 2; 13	OSC; 1; 10	OSC; 2; 18†	HOC2; 1; 11	HOC2; 2; 8	9th	113
2015	Konrad Motorsport	HOC1; 1; 8	HOC1; 2; 14	NNS	LAU; 1	LAU; 2	NOR; 1	NOR; 2	ZAN; 1	ZAN; 2	RBR; 1	RBR; 2	OSC; 1; 13	OSC; 2; 16	NÜR; 1	NÜR; 2	HOC2; 1	HOC2; 2	20th	15

=== Complete ADAC GT Masters results ===
(key) (Races in bold indicate pole position) (Races in italics indicate fastest lap)

Year	Team	Car	1	2	3	4	5	6	7	8	9	10	11	12	13	14	15	16	DC	Points
2011	Hegersport	Porsche 911 GT3 Cup S	OSC; 1	OSC; 2	SAC; 1	SAC; 2	ZOL; 1	ZOL; 2	NÜR; 1	NÜR; 2	RBR; 1	RBR; 2	LAU; 1	LAU; 2	ASS; 1	ASS; 2	HOC; 1 WD	HOC; 2 WD	NC	0
2013	Farnbacher Racing	Porsche 911 GT3 R	OSC; 1; 2	OSC; 2; 3	SPA; 1; 10	SPA; 2 Ret	SAC; 1; 23	SAC; 2; 4	NÜR; 1; 5	NÜR; 2 Ret	RBR; 1; 3	RBR; 2; 7	**LAU**; **1** Ret	LAU; 2; 8	SVK; 1; 9	SVK; 2 Ret	HOC; 1; 11	HOC; 2; 19	12th	84
2014	Farnbacher Racing	Porsche 911 GT3 R	OSC; 1; 13	OSC; 2; 11	ZAN; 1; 10	ZAN; 2; 8	LAU; 1 Ret	LAU; 2; 4	RBR; 1; 12	RBR; 2; 21	SLO; 1; 13	SLO; 2 Ret	NÜR; 1 Ret	NÜR; 2 Ret	SAC; 1; 4	SAC; 2; 21	HOC; 1; 7	HOC; 2 DSQ	25th	35
2018	Honda Team Schubert Motorsport	Honda NSX GT3	OSC; 1	OSC; 2	MST; 1	MST; 2	RBR; 1; 28	RBR; 2; 22	NÜR; 1	NÜR; 2	ZAN; 1	ZAN; 2	SAC; 1	SAC; 2	HOC; 1	HOC; 2			NC	0
2020	Schütz Motorsport	Mercedes-AMG GT3 Evo	LAU1; 1; 9	LAU1; 2; 13	NÜR; 1; 9	NÜR; 2; 25	HOC; 1; 19	HOC; 2 Ret	**SAC**; **1**; 1	SAC; 2 Ret	RBR; 1 Ret	RBR; 2 DNS	LAU2; 1; 14	LAU2; 2; 7	OSC; 1 DSQ	OSC; 2; 16			20th	53

=== Complete Porsche Supercup results ===
(key) (Races in bold indicate pole position) (Races in italics indicate fastest lap)

Year	Team	1	2	3	4	5	6	7	8	9	10	11	Pos.	Pts
2012	Antonelli Motorsport	BHR	BHR	MON	VAL	SIL	HOC; 9	HUN	HUN	SPA	MNZ		NC†	0†
2014	Fach Auto Tech	CAT	MON	RBR	SIL	HOC	HUN	SPA	MNZ	COA; 16	COA; 13		22nd	3
2015	Fach Auto Tech	CAT; 13	MON; 11	RBR; 8	SIL; 13	HUN; 14	SPA; Ret	SPA; 10	MNZ; Ret	MNZ; 10	COA; C	COA; 10	14th	40
2016	Fach Auto Tech	CAT; 9	MON; 12	RBR; 6	SIL; 21	HUN; 5	HOC; 9	SPA; Ret	MNZ; 9	COA; 8	COA; 13		8th	67

=== Complete 24 Hours of Nürburgring results ===
Year	Team	Co-Drivers	Car	Class	Laps	Pos.	Class Pos.
2013	(Germany) Farnbacher Racing	(United States) Leh Keen (Denmark) Christina Nielsen (Czech Republic) Tomáš Pivoda	Porsche 911 GT3 R	SP9	47	DNF	DNF
2014	(Germany) Manthey Racing	(Germany) Otto Klohs (Germany) Harald Schlotter (Germany) Jens Richter	Porsche 911 GT3 R	SP9 GT3	138	35th	15th
2015	(Germany) Team Premio	(Germany) Kenneth Heyer (United Kingdom) Rob Huff (Norway) Christian Krognes	Mercedes-Benz SLS AMG GT3	SP9	151	10th	10th
2018	(Germany) Manthey Racing	(Germany) Lars Kern (Germany) Otto Klohs (Norway) Dennis Olsen	Porsche 911 GT3 R	SP9	129	18th	17th
2026	(Switzerland) BSL Racing Team	(Switzerland) Marc Arn (Germany) Christoph Ruhrmann (Switzerland) Marcel Zimmermann	Porsche 718 Cayman GT4 RS Clubsport	Cup 3	117	DNF	DNF

=== Complete IMSA SportsCar Championship results ===
(key) (Races in bold indicate pole position; results in italics indicate fastest lap)

	Team	Class	Make	Engine	1	2	3	4	5	6	7	8	9	10	11	Pos.	Points
2014	Alex Job Racing	GTD	Porsche 911 GT America	Porsche 4.0 L Flat-6	DAY	SEB; 4	LGA	DET	WGL; 12	MOS	IMS	ELK	VIR	COA	PET	45th	49
2018	3GT Racing	GTD	Lexus RC F GT3	Lexus 5.0 L V8	DAY; 15	SEB; 14	MOH	BEL	WGL	MOS	LIM	ELK	VIR	LGA	PET; 11	39th	53
2019	AIM Vasser Sullivan	GTD	Lexus RC F GT3	Lexus 5.0 L V8	DAY	SEB; 15	MDO	DET	WGL; 5	MOS	LIM	ELK	VIR	LGA	PET	40th	42

=== Complete GT World Challenge results ===
==== Complete Blancpain Sprint Series results ====
(key) (Races in bold indicate pole position; results in italics indicate fastest lap)

Year	Team	Car	Class	1	2	3	4	5	6	7	8	9	10	11	12	13	14	Pos.	Points
2014	Farnbacher Racing	Porsche 997 GT3 R	Pro	NOG; QR	NOG; CR	BRH; QR; DNS	BRH; CR; DNS	ZAN; QR	ZAN; CR	SVK; QR	SVK; CR	ALG; QR	ALG; CR	ZOL; QR	ZOL; CR	BAK; QR	BAK; CR	NC	0

==== GT World Challenge Europe Endurance Cup ====
(Races in bold indicate pole position) (Races in italics indicate fastest lap)

Year	Team	Car	Class	1	2	3	4	5	6	7	Pos.	Points
2014	Fach Auto Tech	Porsche 997 GT3 R	Pro-Am	MNZ	SIL	LEC	SPA; 6H; 46	SPA; 12H; 41	SPA; 24H; 26	NÜR	NC	0
2018	Aust Motorsport	Audi R8 LMS	Silver	MNZ	SIL	LEC	SPA; 6H; 49	SPA; 12H; 44	SPA; 24H; Ret	CAT	20th	5
2019	Jenson Team Rocket RJN	Honda NSX GT3	Silver	MNZ; 13	SIL; 16	LEC; 22	SPA; 6H; 25	SPA; 12H; 29	SPA; 24H; 31	CAT; 39	8th	44

=== Complete International GT Open results ===
Year	Team	Car	Class	1	2	3	4	5	6	7	8	9	10	11	12	13	14	Pos.	Points
2017	Emil Frey Lexus Racing	Lexus RC F GT3	Pro	EST; 1; 1	EST; 2; 8	**SPA**; **1**; 1	SPA; 2; 14	LEC; 1; 4	LEC; 2; 9	HUN; 1; 4	HUN; 2 Ret	**SIL**; **1**; 1	SIL; 2; 3	MNZ; 1; 10	MNZ; 2; 5	**CAT**; **1** Ret	CAT; 2; 1	3rd	98
