= 2018 ADAC GT Masters =

Motorsport season

The 2018 ADAC GT Masters was the twelfth season of the ADAC GT Masters, the grand tourer-style sports car racing founded by the German automobile club ADAC. The season began on 14 April at Oschersleben and ended on 23 September at Hockenheim after seven double-header meetings.

== Entry list ==
Team	Car	No.	Driver	Status	Rounds
(Germany) Callaway Competition	Corvette C7 GT3-R	1	(Germany) Daniel Keilwitz		All
(Germany) Callaway Competition	Corvette C7 GT3-R	1	(Germany) Marvin Kirchhöfer		All
(Germany) Aust Motorsport	Audi R8 LMS	3	(Switzerland) Nikolaj Rogivue	J	All
(Germany) Aust Motorsport	Audi R8 LMS	3	(Belgium) Frédéric Vervisch		1, 3–7
(Germany) Aust Motorsport	Audi R8 LMS	3	(Germany) Christer Jöns		2
(Germany) Aust Motorsport	Audi R8 LMS	4	(Germany) Maximilian Hackländer		All
(Germany) Aust Motorsport	Audi R8 LMS	4	(Switzerland) Remo Lips	T	All
(Germany) Phoenix Racing	Audi R8 LMS	5	(United Kingdom) Philip Ellis	J	All
(Germany) Phoenix Racing	Audi R8 LMS	5	(Austria) Max Hofer	J	All
(Germany) Phoenix Racing	Audi R8 LMS	6	(Colombia) Óscar Tunjo	J	All
(Germany) Phoenix Racing	Audi R8 LMS	6	(United Kingdom) Jake Dennis		1
(Germany) Phoenix Racing	Audi R8 LMS	6	(Russia) Ivan Lukashevich		2–7
(Austria) HB Racing	Ferrari 488 GT3	7	(Germany) Luca Ludwig		All
(Austria) HB Racing	Ferrari 488 GT3	7	(Germany) Dominik Schwager		1–2, 4–5
(Austria) HB Racing	Ferrari 488 GT3	7	(Germany) Alfred Renauer		3
(Austria) HB Racing	Ferrari 488 GT3	7	(Italy) Davide Rigon		6–7
(Germany) / Car Collection Motorsport (Note: The team entered as Car Collection Motorsport in Rounds 1 and 2 and entered as SML CarWellness by Car Collection from Round 3.); (Germany) / SML CarWellness by Car Collection	Mercedes-AMG GT3	8	(Germany) Lance David Arnold		1–4
(Germany) / Car Collection Motorsport; (Germany) / SML CarWellness by Car Collection	Mercedes-AMG GT3	8	(Germany) Christopher Friedrich	J	1–4
(Germany) Honda Team Schubert Motorsport	Honda NSX GT3	9	(Germany) Christopher Dreyspring	J	All
(Germany) Honda Team Schubert Motorsport	Honda NSX GT3	9	(Switzerland) Giorgio Maggi	J	All
(Germany) Honda Team Schubert Motorsport	Honda NSX GT3	10	(Switzerland) Philipp Frommenwiler		3
(Germany) Honda Team Schubert Motorsport	Honda NSX GT3	10	(Argentina) Esteban Guerrieri		3
(Germany) EFP by TECE	Audi R8 LMS	11	(Germany) Elia Erhart		All
(Germany) EFP by TECE	Audi R8 LMS	11	(Germany) Pierre Kaffer		All
(Germany) EFP by TECE	Audi R8 LMS	12	(Germany) Florian Spengler		All
(Germany) EFP by TECE	Audi R8 LMS	12	(Belgium) Dries Vanthoor		All
(Austria) RWT Racing	Corvette C7 GT3-R	13	(Germany) Sven Barth	T	All
(Austria) RWT Racing	Corvette C7 GT3-R	13	(Germany) Claudia Hürtgen	T	All
(Germany) MRS GT-Racing	BMW M6 GT3	14	(Germany) Jens Klingmann		All
(Germany) MRS GT-Racing	BMW M6 GT3	14	(Austria) Christopher Zöchling		All
(Germany) KÜS Team75 Bernhard	Porsche 911 GT3 R	17	(Germany) Timo Bernhard		All
(Germany) KÜS Team75 Bernhard	Porsche 911 GT3 R	17	(France) Kévin Estre		1–4, 6–7
(Germany) KÜS Team75 Bernhard	Porsche 911 GT3 R	17	(Germany) Marc Lieb		5
(Germany) KÜS Team75 Bernhard	Porsche 911 GT3 R	18	(Austria) Klaus Bachler		All
(Germany) KÜS Team75 Bernhard	Porsche 911 GT3 R	18	(Belgium) Adrien De Leener		All
(Austria) / GRT Grasser Racing Team (Note: Cars No. 19 and 82 entered as GRT Grasser Racing Team and car No. 63 entered as Orange1 by GRT Grasser.); (Austria) / Orange1 by GRT Grasser	Lamborghini Huracán GT3	19	(Argentina) Ezequiel Pérez Companc	J	All
(Austria) / GRT Grasser Racing Team; (Austria) / Orange1 by GRT Grasser	Lamborghini Huracán GT3	19	(France) Franck Perera		1–4
(Austria) / GRT Grasser Racing Team; (Austria) / Orange1 by GRT Grasser	Lamborghini Huracán GT3	19	(Italy) Marco Mapelli		5–6
(Austria) / GRT Grasser Racing Team; (Austria) / Orange1 by GRT Grasser	Lamborghini Huracán GT3	19	(Netherlands) Carlo van Dam		7
(Austria) / GRT Grasser Racing Team; (Austria) / Orange1 by GRT Grasser	Lamborghini Huracán GT3	63	(Italy) Mirko Bortolotti		All
(Austria) / GRT Grasser Racing Team; (Austria) / Orange1 by GRT Grasser	Lamborghini Huracán GT3	63	(Italy) Andrea Caldarelli		All
(Austria) / GRT Grasser Racing Team; (Austria) / Orange1 by GRT Grasser	Lamborghini Huracán GT3	82	(Germany) Christian Engelhart		All
(Austria) / GRT Grasser Racing Team; (Austria) / Orange1 by GRT Grasser	Lamborghini Huracán GT3	82	(Switzerland) Rolf Ineichen	T	All
(Germany) Team Zakspeed BKK Mobil Oil Racing	Mercedes-AMG GT3	20	(Germany) Kim-Luis Schramm	J	All
(Germany) Team Zakspeed BKK Mobil Oil Racing	Mercedes-AMG GT3	20	(Denmark) Nicolai Sylvest	J	All
(Germany) Team Zakspeed BKK Mobil Oil Racing	Mercedes-AMG GT3	21	(Germany) Sebastian Asch		All
(Germany) Team Zakspeed BKK Mobil Oil Racing	Mercedes-AMG GT3	21	(Germany) Luca Stolz	J	All
(Germany) BWT Mücke Motorsport	Audi R8 LMS	24	(Germany) Mike David Ortmann	J	All
(Germany) BWT Mücke Motorsport	Audi R8 LMS	24	(Germany) Markus Winkelhock		All
(Germany) BWT Mücke Motorsport	Audi R8 LMS	25	(Switzerland) Ricardo Feller	J	All
(Germany) BWT Mücke Motorsport	Audi R8 LMS	25	(Germany) Christopher Haase		All
(Germany) BWT Mücke Motorsport	Audi R8 LMS	26	(Switzerland) Jeffrey Schmidt	J	All
(Germany) BWT Mücke Motorsport	Audi R8 LMS	26	(United Kingdom) Jamie Green		1, 3, 5
(Germany) BWT Mücke Motorsport	Audi R8 LMS	26	(Germany) Stefan Mücke		2, 4, 6–7
(Germany) Montaplast by Land-Motorsport	Audi R8 LMS	28	(South Africa) Kelvin van der Linde		All
(Germany) Montaplast by Land-Motorsport	Audi R8 LMS	28	(South Africa) Sheldon van der Linde	J	All
(Germany) Montaplast by Land-Motorsport	Audi R8 LMS	29	(Germany) Christopher Mies		All
(Germany) Montaplast by Land-Motorsport	Audi R8 LMS	29	(Belgium) Alessio Picariello	J	1–3
(Germany) Montaplast by Land-Motorsport	Audi R8 LMS	29	(United Kingdom) Jake Dennis		4–5, 7
(Germany) Montaplast by Land-Motorsport	Audi R8 LMS	29	(Spain) Alex Riberas		6
(Czech Republic) Team ISR	Audi R8 LMS	33	(Czech Republic) Filip Salaquarda		All
(Czech Republic) Team ISR	Audi R8 LMS	33	(Germany) Frank Stippler		All
(Germany) Team Rosberg	Lamborghini Huracán GT3	35	(Sweden) Jimmy Eriksson		All
(Germany) Team Rosberg	Lamborghini Huracán GT3	35	(Germany) Jonathan Judek	J	All
(Germany) Team Rosberg	Lamborghini Huracán GT3	53	(Italy) Michele Beretta	J	All
(Germany) Team Rosberg	Lamborghini Huracán GT3	53	(Finland) Aaro Vainio	J	All
(Germany) BMW Team Schnitzer	BMW M6 GT3	42	(Denmark) Mikkel Jensen	J	All
(Germany) BMW Team Schnitzer	BMW M6 GT3	42	(Germany) Timo Scheider		All
(Germany) BMW Team Schnitzer	BMW M6 GT3	43	(Sweden) Victor Bouveng	J	All
(Germany) BMW Team Schnitzer	BMW M6 GT3	43	(Germany) Dennis Marschall	J	All
(Germany) / Mann-Filter Team HTP (Note: Cars No. 47 and 48 entered as Mann-Filter Team HTP and car No. 84 entered as AutoArenA Motorsport.); (Germany) / AutoArenA Motorsport	Mercedes-AMG GT3	47	(Germany) Maximilian Götz		All
(Germany) / Mann-Filter Team HTP; (Germany) / AutoArenA Motorsport	Mercedes-AMG GT3	47	(Germany) Markus Pommer		All
(Germany) / Mann-Filter Team HTP; (Germany) / AutoArenA Motorsport	Mercedes-AMG GT3	48	(Germany) Maximilian Buhk		All
(Germany) / Mann-Filter Team HTP; (Germany) / AutoArenA Motorsport	Mercedes-AMG GT3	48	(Netherlands) Indy Dontje	J	All
(Germany) / Mann-Filter Team HTP; (Germany) / AutoArenA Motorsport	Mercedes-AMG GT3	84	(Germany) Patrick Assenheimer	J	All
(Germany) / Mann-Filter Team HTP; (Germany) / AutoArenA Motorsport	Mercedes-AMG GT3	84	(Austria) Clemens Schmid		1–3
(Germany) / Mann-Filter Team HTP; (Germany) / AutoArenA Motorsport	Mercedes-AMG GT3	84	(Italy) Raffaele Marciello		4–5
(Germany) / Mann-Filter Team HTP; (Germany) / AutoArenA Motorsport	Mercedes-AMG GT3	84	(Germany) Maro Engel		6
(Germany) / Mann-Filter Team HTP; (Germany) / AutoArenA Motorsport	Mercedes-AMG GT3	84	(Austria) Dominik Baumann		7
(Germany) YACO Racing	Audi R8 LMS	50	(Switzerland) Rahel Frey		All
(Germany) YACO Racing	Audi R8 LMS	50	(Germany) Philip Geipel		All
(Germany) IronForce by Ring Police	Porsche 911 GT3 R	69	(Germany) Lucas Luhr		All
(Germany) IronForce by Ring Police	Porsche 911 GT3 R	69	(Germany) Jan-Erik Slooten	T	All
(Germany) Precote Herberth Motorsport	Porsche 911 GT3 R	99	(France) Mathieu Jaminet		All
(Germany) Precote Herberth Motorsport	Porsche 911 GT3 R	99	(Germany) Robert Renauer		All

Icon	Legend
J	Junior
T	Trophy

== Race calendar and results ==
On 29 November 2017, the ADAC announced the 2018 calendar.

Round		Circuit	Date	Pole position	Race winner
1	R1	(Germany) Motorsport Arena Oschersleben	14 April	(Germany) No. 5 Phoenix Racing	(Germany) No. 5 Phoenix Racing
1	R1	(Germany) Motorsport Arena Oschersleben	14 April	(United Kingdom) Philip Ellis (Austria) Max Hofer	(United Kingdom) Philip Ellis (Austria) Max Hofer
1	R2	(Germany) Motorsport Arena Oschersleben	15 April	(Austria) No. 82 GRT Grasser Racing Team	(Austria) No. 63 Orange1 by GRT Grasser
1	R2	(Germany) Motorsport Arena Oschersleben	15 April	(Germany) Christian Engelhart (Switzerland) Rolf Ineichen	(Italy) Mirko Bortolotti (Italy) Andrea Caldarelli
2	R1	(Czech Republic) Autodrom Most	28 April	(Germany) No. 26 BWT Mücke Motorsport	(Germany) No. 26 BWT Mücke Motorsport
2	R1	(Czech Republic) Autodrom Most	28 April	(Germany) Stefan Mücke (Switzerland) Jeffrey Schmidt	(Germany) Stefan Mücke (Switzerland) Jeffrey Schmidt
2	R2	(Czech Republic) Autodrom Most	29 April	(Germany) No. 47 Mann-Filter Team HTP	(Germany) No. 47 Mann-Filter Team HTP
2	R2	(Czech Republic) Autodrom Most	29 April	(Germany) Maximilian Götz (Germany) Markus Pommer	(Germany) Maximilian Götz (Germany) Markus Pommer
3	R1	(Austria) Red Bull Ring	9 June	(Germany) No. 1 Callaway Competition	(Germany) No. 1 Callaway Competition
3	R1	(Austria) Red Bull Ring	9 June	(Germany) Daniel Keilwitz (Germany) Marvin Kirchhöfer	(Germany) Daniel Keilwitz (Germany) Marvin Kirchhöfer
3	R2	(Austria) Red Bull Ring	10 June	(Germany) No. 1 Callaway Competition	(Germany) No. 1 Callaway Competition
3	R2	(Austria) Red Bull Ring	10 June	(Germany) Daniel Keilwitz (Germany) Marvin Kirchhöfer	(Germany) Daniel Keilwitz (Germany) Marvin Kirchhöfer
4	R1	(Germany) Nürburgring	4 August	(Germany) No. 20 Team Zakspeed BKK Mobil Oil Racing	(Germany) No. 48 Mann-Filter Team HTP
4	R1	(Germany) Nürburgring	4 August	(Germany) Kim-Luis Schramm (Denmark) Nicolai Sylvest	(Germany) Maximilian Buhk (Netherlands) Indy Dontje
4	R2	(Germany) Nürburgring	5 August	(Czech Republic) No. 33 Team ISR	(Czech Republic) No. 33 Team ISR
4	R2	(Germany) Nürburgring	5 August	(Czech Republic) Filip Salaquarda (Germany) Frank Stippler	(Czech Republic) Filip Salaquarda (Germany) Frank Stippler
5	R1	(Netherlands) Circuit Zandvoort	18 August	(Austria) No. 19 GRT Grasser Racing Team	(Austria) No. 19 GRT Grasser Racing Team
5	R1	(Netherlands) Circuit Zandvoort	18 August	(Italy) Marco Mapelli (Argentina) Ezequiel Pérez Companc	(Italy) Marco Mapelli (Argentina) Ezequiel Pérez Companc
5	R2	(Netherlands) Circuit Zandvoort	19 August	(Germany) No. 99 Precote Herberth Motorsport	(Germany) No. 99 Precote Herberth Motorsport
5	R2	(Netherlands) Circuit Zandvoort	19 August	(France) Mathieu Jaminet (Germany) Robert Renauer	(France) Mathieu Jaminet (Germany) Robert Renauer
6	R1	(Germany) Sachsenring	8 September	(Germany) No. 17 KÜS Team75 Bernhard	(Germany) No. 28 Montaplast by Land-Motorsport
6	R1	(Germany) Sachsenring	8 September	(Germany) Timo Bernhard (France) Kévin Estre	(South Africa) Kelvin van der Linde (South Africa) Sheldon van der Linde
6	R2	(Germany) Sachsenring	9 September	(Germany) No. 18 KÜS Team75 Bernhard	(Germany) No. 11 EFP by TECE
6	R2	(Germany) Sachsenring	9 September	(Austria) Klaus Bachler (Belgium) Adrien De Leener	(Germany) Elia Erhart (Germany) Pierre Kaffer
7	R1	(Germany) Hockenheimring	22 September	(Germany) No. 99 Precote Herberth Motorsport	(Germany) No. 1 Callaway Competition
7	R1	(Germany) Hockenheimring	22 September	(France) Mathieu Jaminet (Germany) Robert Renauer	(Germany) Daniel Keilwitz (Germany) Marvin Kirchhöfer
7	R2	(Germany) Hockenheimring	23 September	(Germany) No. 47 Mann-Filter Team HTP	(Germany) No. 28 Montaplast by Land-Motorsport
7	R2	(Germany) Hockenheimring	23 September	(Germany) Maximilian Götz (Germany) Markus Pommer	(South Africa) Kelvin van der Linde (South Africa) Sheldon van der Linde

== Championship standings ==
Scoring system

Championship points were awarded for the first ten positions in each race. Entries were required to complete 75% of the winning car's race distance in order to be classified and earn points. Individual drivers were required to participate for a minimum of 25 minutes in order to earn championship points in any race.

Position	**1st**	**2nd**	**3rd**	**4th**	**5th**	**6th**	**7th**	**8th**	**9th**	**10th**
Points	25	18	15	12	10	8	6	4	2	1

=== Drivers' championships ===
==== Overall ====
Pos.	Driver	Team	OSC (Germany)		MST (Czech Republic)		RBR (Austria)		NÜR (Germany)		ZAN (Netherlands)		SAC (Germany)		HOC (Germany)		Points
1	(France) Mathieu Jaminet (Germany) Robert Renauer	(Germany) Precote Herberth Motorsport	5	4	3	3	6	9	16	5	12	**1**	Ret	4	**2**	5	137
2	(South Africa) Kelvin van der Linde (South Africa) Sheldon van der Linde	(Germany) Montaplast by Land-Motorsport	2	Ret	9	8	5	13	Ret	10	2	11	1	2	3	1	136
3	(Germany) Daniel Keilwitz (Germany) Marvin Kirchhöfer	(Germany) Callaway Competition	19	18	2	2	**1**	**1**	Ret	Ret	17	13	Ret	7	1	7	123
4	(Germany) Maximilian Götz (Germany) Markus Pommer	(Germany) Mann-Filter Team HTP	9	5	Ret	**1**	18	3	3	2	6	4	Ret	15	4	**Ret**	117
5	(Germany) Maximilian Buhk (Netherlands) Indy Dontje	(Germany) Mann-Filter Team HTP	6	27	4	16	9	16	1	17	26	5	4	22	15	3	84
6	(Denmark) Mikkel Jensen (Germany) Timo Scheider	(Germany) BMW Team Schnitzer	3	16	6	20	2	10	Ret	28	7	25	3	8	14	4	79
7	(Italy) Mirko Bortolotti (Italy) Andrea Caldarelli	(Austria) Orange1 by GRT Grasser	DSQ	1	10	12	32	2	2	15	Ret	24	26	Ret	13	9	64
8	(Switzerland) Jeffrey Schmidt	(Germany) BWT Mücke Motorsport	8	26	**1**	9	19	8	12	12	28	9	5	3	17	13	62
9	(Czech Republic) Filip Salaquarda (Germany) Frank Stippler	(Czech Republic) Team ISR	7	Ret	Ret	5	Ret	4	Ret	**1**	30	8	Ret	19	19	Ret	57
10	(Germany) Stefan Mücke	(Germany) BWT Mücke Motorsport			**1**	9			12	12			5	3	17	13	52
11	(Germany) Timo Bernhard	(Germany) KÜS Team75 Bernhard	13	7	12	Ret	4	Ret	5	8	Ret	Ret	**DSQ**	5	9	6	52
11	(France) Kévin Estre	(Germany) KÜS Team75 Bernhard	13	7	12	Ret	4	Ret	5	8			**DSQ**	5	9	6	52
12	(Germany) Luca Ludwig	(Austria) HB Racing	16	3	Ret	4	7	Ret	9	13	22	14	10	Ret	7	8	46
13	(Switzerland) Ricardo Feller (Germany) Christopher Haase	(Germany) BWT Mücke Motorsport	11	10	Ret	7	10	14	15	4	10	6	7	23	5	12	45
14	(Germany) Mike David Ortmann (Germany) Markus Winkelhock	(Germany) BWT Mücke Motorsport	14	14	11	11	Ret	17	14	3	4	7	6	Ret	Ret	10	42
15	(Germany) Sebastian Asch (Germany) Luca Stolz	(Germany) Team Zakspeed BKK Mobil Oil Racing	4	17	7	Ret	13	5	4	9	14	Ret	18	26	27	16	42
16	(United Kingdom) Philip Ellis (Austria) Max Hofer	(Germany) Phoenix Racing	**1**	Ret	Ret	13	8	Ret	19	11	5	12	11	11	23	19	39
17	(Germany) Christian Engelhart (Switzerland) Rolf Ineichen	(Austria) GRT Grasser Racing Team	DSQ	**2**	17	15	12	24	10	33	9	Ret	Ret	14	Ret	2	39
18	(Germany) Christopher Mies	(Germany) Montaplast by Land-Motorsport	18	11	Ret	6	20	11	Ret	7	3	16	8	10	Ret	Ret	34
19	(Argentina) Ezequiel Pérez Companc	(Austria) GRT Grasser Racing Team	DSQ	23	Ret	Ret	29	6	24	22	**1**	Ret	14	Ret	Ret	18	33
20	(Germany) Dominik Schwager	(Austria) HB Racing	16	3	Ret	4			9	13	22	14					29
21	(Germany) Kim-Luis Schramm (Denmark) Nicolai Sylvest	(Germany) Team Zakspeed BKK Mobil Oil Racing	21	31	14	26	22	23	**22**	16	25	17	2	6	18	Ret	26
22	(Germany) Elia Erhart (Germany) Pierre Kaffer	(Germany) EFP by TECE	26	32	19	Ret	21	32	17	27	20	21	23	1	22	14	25
22	(Italy) Marco Mapelli	(Austria) GRT Grasser Racing Team									**1**	Ret	14	Ret			25
23	(Austria) Klaus Bachler (Belgium) Adrien De Leener	(Germany) KÜS Team75 Bernhard	25	12	15	14	15	29	Ret	6	21	3	16	**Ret**	12	Ret	23
24	(United Kingdom) Jake Dennis	(Germany) Phoenix Racing	10	29													22
24	(United Kingdom) Jake Dennis	(Germany) Montaplast by Land-Motorsport							Ret	7	3	16			Ret	Ret	22
25	(Germany) Patrick Assenheimer	(Germany) AutoArenA Motorsport	17	13	Ret	21	23	20	Ret	21	13	2	15	13	10	25	19
26	(Italy) Raffaele Marciello	(Germany) AutoArenA Motorsport							Ret	21	13	2					18
27	(Germany) Jens Klingmann (Austria) Christopher Zöchling	(Germany) MRS GT-Racing	31	19	5	10	Ret	7	Ret	18	Ret	29	12	Ret	Ret	20	17
28	(Sweden) Victor Bouveng (Germany) Dennis Marschall	(Germany) BMW Team Schnitzer	15	20	DNS	Ret	3	28	23	29	27	19	27	16	11	11	15
29	(Germany) Sven Barth (Germany) Claudia Hürtgen	(Austria) RWT Racing	24	15	8	17	31	19	Ret	19	Ret	28	19	24	6	Ret	12
30	(Italy) Davide Rigon	(Austria) HB Racing											10	Ret	7	8	11
31	(Germany) Florian Spengler (Belgium) Dries Vanthoor	(Germany) EFP by TECE	20	9	Ret	Ret	14	12	Ret	Ret	8	10	20	18	8	Ret	11
32	(United Kingdom) Jamie Green	(Germany) BWT Mücke Motorsport	8	26			19	8			28	9					10
33	(Colombia) Óscar Tunjo	(Germany) Phoenix Racing	10	29	Ret	19	11	Ret	7	30	11	15	13	9	21	15	9
34	(Belgium) Alessio Picariello	(Germany) Montaplast by Land-Motorsport	18	11	Ret	6	20	11									8
34	(Germany) Lance David Arnold (Germany) Christopher Friedrich	(Germany) Car Collection Motorsport	23	6	16	18											8
34	(Germany) Lance David Arnold (Germany) Christopher Friedrich	(Germany) SML CarWellness by Car Collection					24	25	13	24							8
34	(Germany) Christopher Dreyspring (Switzerland) Giorgio Maggi	(Germany) Honda Team Schubert Motorsport	Ret	24	24	DSQ	17	26	6	23	16	22	25	17	Ret	23	8
34	(France) Franck Perera	(Austria) GRT Grasser Racing Team	DSQ	23	Ret	Ret	29	6	24	22							8
35	(Russia) Ivan Lukashevich	(Germany) Phoenix Racing			Ret	19	11	Ret	7	30	11	15	13	9	21	15	8
36	(Germany) Alfred Renauer	(Austria) HB Racing					7	Ret									6
37	(Italy) Michele Beretta (Finland) Aaro Vainio	(Germany) Team Rosberg	29	25	22	DNS	30	15	8	20	19	26	9	25	25	17	6
38	(Spain) Alex Riberas	(Germany) Montaplast by Land-Motorsport											8	10			5
39	(Switzerland) Nikolaj Rogivue	(Germany) Aust Motorsport	12	8	13	25	Ret	18	11	32	18	Ret	22	Ret	Ret	DNS	4
39	(Belgium) Frédéric Vervisch	(Germany) Aust Motorsport	12	8			Ret	18	11	32	18	Ret	22	Ret	Ret	DNS	4
40	(Austria) Dominik Baumann	(Germany) AutoArenA Motorsport													10	25	1
	(Germany) Maximilian Hackländer (Switzerland) Remo Lips	(Germany) Aust Motorsport	30	30	23	23	27	30	20	14	24	23	24	12	24	24	0
	(Germany) Maro Engel	(Germany) AutoArenA Motorsport											15	13			0
	(Austria) Clemens Schmid	(Germany) AutoArenA Motorsport	17	13	Ret	21	23	20									0
	(Germany) Christer Jöns	(Germany) Aust Motorsport			13	25											0
	(Switzerland) Rahel Frey (Germany) Philip Geipel	(Germany) YACO Racing	28	21	21	22	16	21	Ret	31	15	27	Ret	20	20	21	0
	(Sweden) Jimmy Eriksson (Germany) Jonathan Judek	(Germany) Team Rosberg	27	28	20	DSQ	26	31	21	26	23	20	21	Ret	16	Ret	0
	(Germany) Lucas Luhr (Germany) Jan-Erik Slooten	(Germany) IronForce by Ring Police	22	22	18	24	25	27	18	25	29	18	17	21	26	22	0
	(Netherlands) Carlo van Dam	(Austria) GRT Grasser Racing Team													Ret	18	0
	(Switzerland) Philipp Frommenwiler (Argentina) Esteban Guerrieri	(Germany) Honda Team Schubert Motorsport					28	22									0
	(Germany) Marc Lieb	(Germany) KÜS Team75 Bernhard									Ret	Ret					0
Pos.	Driver	Team	OSC (Germany)		MST (Czech Republic)		RBR (Austria)		NÜR (Germany)		ZAN (Netherlands)		SAC (Germany)		HOC (Germany)		Points

Key
Colour	Result
Gold	Race winner
Silver	2nd place
Bronze	3rd place
Green	Points finish
Blue	Non-points finish
Blue	Non-classified finish (NC)
Purple	Did not finish (Ret)
Black	Disqualified (DSQ)
Black	Excluded (EX)
White	Did not start (DNS)
White	Race cancelled (C)
White	Withdrew (WD)
Blank	Did not participate

**Bold** – Pole
Italics – Fastest Lap

==== Junior Cup ====
Pos.	Driver	Team	OSC (Germany)		MST (Czech Republic)		RBR (Austria)		NÜR (Germany)		ZAN (Netherlands)		SAC (Germany)		HOC (Germany)		Points
1	(South Africa) Sheldon van der Linde	(Germany) Montaplast by Land-Motorsport	2	Ret	9	8	5	13	Ret	10	2	11	**1**	2	**3**	**1**	204
2	(Denmark) Mikkel Jensen	(Germany) BMW Team Schnitzer	3	16	6	20	**2**	10	Ret	28	7	25	3	8	14	4	136
3	(Netherlands) Indy Dontje	(Germany) Mann-Filter Team HTP	6	27	4	**16**	9	16	1	17	26	**5**	4	**22**	15	3	132
4	(Switzerland) Ricardo Feller	(Germany) BWT Mücke Motorsport	11	10	Ret	7	10	14	15	4	10	6	7	23	5	12	125
5	(United Kingdom) Philip Ellis (Austria) Max Hofer	(Germany) Phoenix Racing	**1**	Ret	Ret	13	8	Ret	19	11	5	12	11	11	23	19	124.5
6	(Switzerland) Jeffrey Schmidt	(Germany) BWT Mücke Motorsport	8	26	**1**	9	19	8	12	12	28	9	5	3	17	13	123
7	(Germany) Mike David Ortmann	(Germany) BWT Mücke Motorsport	14	14	11	11	Ret	17	14	**3**	4	7	6	Ret	Ret	10	102
8	(Germany) Luca Stolz	(Germany) Team Zakspeed BKK Mobil Oil Racing	4	17	7	Ret	13	5	4	9	14	Ret	18	26	27	16	94
9	(Colombia) Óscar Tunjo	(Germany) Phoenix Racing	10	**29**	Ret	19	11	Ret	7	30	11	15	13	9	21	15	74.5
10	(Germany) Kim-Luis Schramm (Denmark) Nicolai Sylvest	(Germany) Team Zakspeed BKK Mobil Oil Racing	21	31	14	26	22	23	**22**	16	25	17	2	6	18	Ret	70.5
11	(Sweden) Victor Bouveng (Germany) Dennis Marschall	(Germany) BMW Team Schnitzer	15	20	DNS	Ret	3	28	23	29	27	19	27	16	11	11	70.5
12	(Germany) Patrick Assenheimer	(Germany) AutoArenA Motorsport	17	13	Ret	21	23	20	Ret	21	13	2	15	13	10	25	61
13	(Germany) Christopher Friedrich	(Germany) Car Collection Motorsport	23	6	16	18											52.5
13	(Germany) Christopher Friedrich	(Germany) SML CarWellness by Car Collection					24	25	13	24							52.5
14	(Belgium) Alessio Picariello	(Germany) Montaplast by Land-Motorsport	18	11	Ret	6	20	**11**									47
15	(Argentina) Ezequiel Pérez Companc	(Austria) GRT Grasser Racing Team	DSQ	23	Ret	Ret	29	6	24	22	**1**	Ret	14	Ret	Ret	18	44
16	(Switzerland) Nikolaj Rogivue	(Germany) Aust Motorsport	12	8	13	25	Ret	18	11	32	18	Ret	22	Ret	Ret	DNS	37
17	(Italy) Michele Beretta (Finland) Aaro Vainio	(Germany) Team Rosberg	29	25	22	DNS	30	15	8	20	19	26	9	25	25	17	31.5
18	(Germany) Christopher Dreyspring (Switzerland) Giorgio Maggi	(Germany) Honda Team Schubert Motorsport	Ret	24	24	DSQ	17	26	6	23	16	22	25	17	Ret	23	30
19	(Germany) Jonathan Judek	(Germany) Team Rosberg	27	28	20	DSQ	26	31	21	26	23	20	21	Ret	16	Ret	7
Pos.	Driver	Team	OSC (Germany)		MST (Czech Republic)		RBR (Austria)		NÜR (Germany)		ZAN (Netherlands)		SAC (Germany)		HOC (Germany)		Points

==== Trophy Cup ====
Pos.	Driver	Team	Points
1	(Switzerland) Remo Lips	(Germany) Aust Motorsport	360.5
2	(Germany) Jan-Erik Slooten	(Germany) IronForce by Ring Police	328.5
3	(Germany) Sven Barth (Germany) Claudia Hürtgen	(Austria) RWT Racing	306
4	(Switzerland) Rolf Ineichen	(Austria) GRT Grasser Racing Team	216

=== Teams' championship ===
Pos.	Team	Manufacturer	OSC (Germany)		MST (Czech Republic)		RBR (Austria)		NÜR (Germany)		ZAN (Netherlands)		SAC (Germany)		HOC (Germany)		Points
1	(Germany) Mann-Filter Team HTP	Mercedes-AMG	6	5	4	**1**	9	3	1	2	6	4	4	15	4	**3**	178
2	(Germany) Montaplast by Land-Motorsport	Audi	2	11	9	6	5	11	Ret	7	2	11	1	2	3	1	153
3	(Germany) Precote Herberth Motorsport	Porsche	5	4	3	3	6	9	16	5	12	**1**	Ret	4	**2**	5	145
4	(Germany) Callaway Competition	Chevrolet	19	18	2	2	**1**	**1**	Ret	Ret	17	13	Ret	7	1	7	124
5	(Germany) BWT Mücke Motorsport	Audi	8	10	**1**	7	10	8	12	3	4	6	5	3	5	10	118
6	(Germany) BMW Team Schnitzer	BMW	3	16	6	20	2	10	23	28	7	19	3	8	11	4	81
7	(Germany) KÜS Team75 Bernhard	Porsche	13	7	12	14	4	29	5	6	21	3	**16**	**5**	9	6	79
8	(Germany) Team Zakspeed BKK Mobil Oil Racing	Mercedes-AMG	4	17	7	16	13	5	**4**	9	14	17	2	6	18	16	76
9	(Austria) GRT Grasser Racing Team	Lamborghini	DSQ	**2**	Ret	Ret	12	6	10	22	**1**	Ret	14	14	Ret	2	73
10	(Austria) Orange1 by GRT Grasser	Lamborghini	DSQ	1	10	12	32	2	2	15	Ret	24	26	Ret	13	9	66
11	(Germany) Phoenix Racing	Audi	**1**	29	Ret	13	8	Ret	7	11	5	12	11	9	21	15	64
12	(Czech Republic) Team ISR	Audi	7	Ret	Ret	5	Ret	4	Ret	**1**	30	8	Ret	19	19	Ret	61
13	(Austria) HB Racing	Ferrari	16	3	Ret	4	7	Ret	9	13	22	14	10	Ret	7	8	57
14	(Germany) EFP by TECE	Audi	20	9	19	Ret	14	12	17	27	8	10	20	1	8	14	43
15	(Germany) MRS GT-Racing	BMW	31	19	5	10	Ret	7	Ret	18	Ret	29	12	Ret	Ret	20	22
16	(Germany) AutoArenA Motorsport	Mercedes-AMG	17	13	Ret	21	23	20	Ret	21	13	2	15	13	10	25	21
17	(Germany) Team Rosberg	Lamborghini	27	25	20	DSQ	26	15	8	20	19	20	9	25	16	17	14
18	(Austria) RWT Racing	Chevrolet	24	15	8	17	31	19	Ret	19	Ret	28	19	24	6	Ret	12
19	(Germany) Honda Team Schubert Motorsport	Honda	Ret	24	24	DSQ	17	22	6	23	16	22	25	17	Ret	23	10
20	(Germany) Aust Motorsport	Audi	12	8	13	23	27	18	11	14	18	23	22	12	24	24	9
21	(Germany) (SML CarWellness by) Car Collection Motorsport	Mercedes-AMG	23	6	16	18	24	25	13	24							8
	(Germany) YACO Racing	Audi	28	21	21	22	16	21	Ret	31	15	27	Ret	20	20	21	0
	(Germany) IronForce by Ring Police	Porsche	22	22	18	24	25	27	18	25	29	18	17	21	26	22	0
Pos.	Team	Manufacturer	OSC (Germany)		MST (Czech Republic)		RBR (Austria)		NÜR (Germany)		ZAN (Netherlands)		SAC (Germany)		HOC (Germany)		Points

== Bibliography ==
- Tim Upietz; Oliver Runschke (2018). ADAC GT Masters Jahrbuch 2018 (in German). Duisburg: Gruppe C Motorsport Verlag. p. 224. ISBN 978-3-928540-97-1.
