= Victor Bouveng =

Swedish racing driver (born 1996)

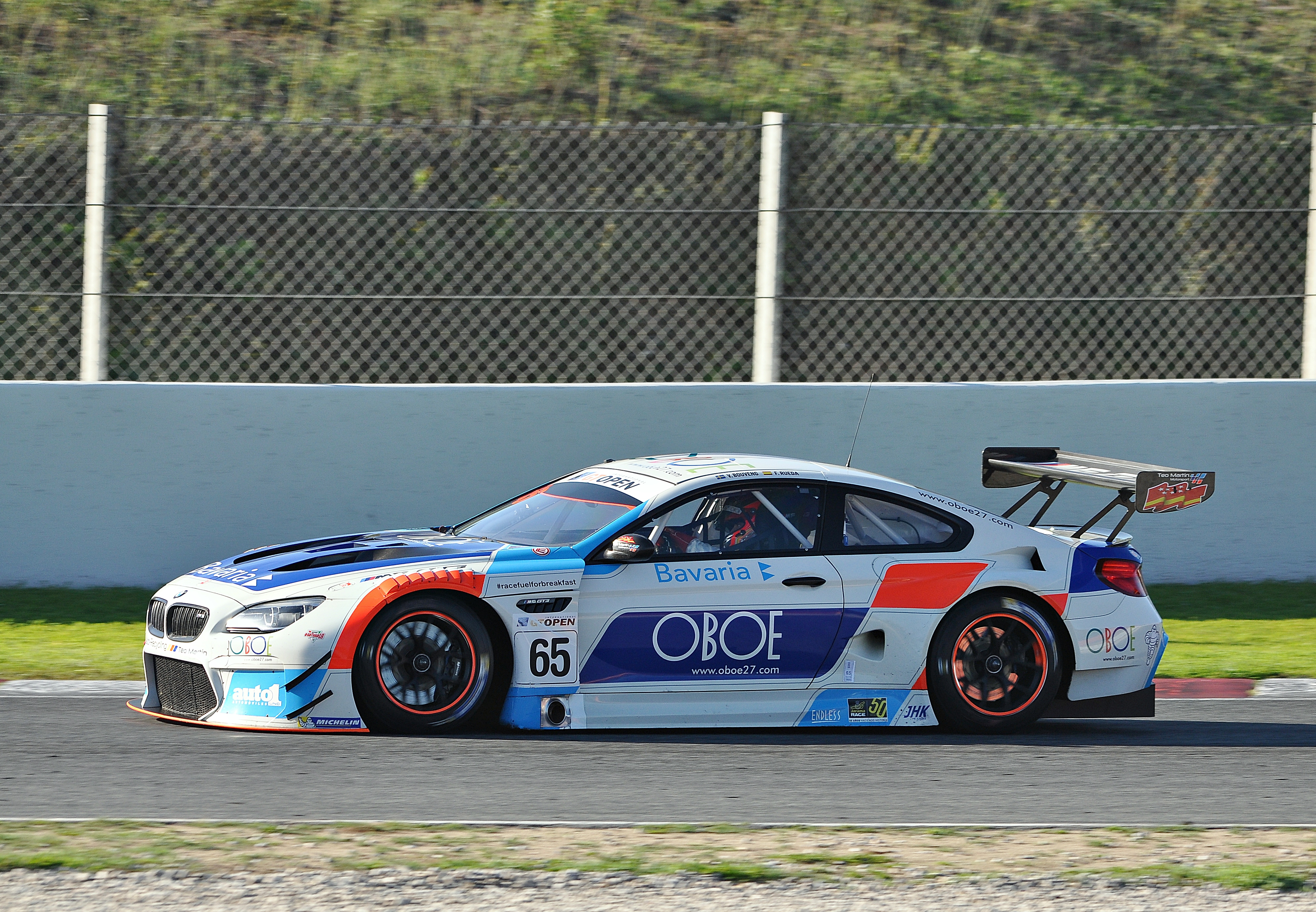
- Bouveng in 2017
- Nationality: (Sweden) Swedish
- Born: Victor Nils Georg Bouveng; 17 April 1996 (age 30) Knivsta, Sweden
- Categorisation: FIA Silver

Championship titles
- 2026: GT4 European Series – Pro-Am

Victor Nils Georg Bouveng (born 17 April 1996) is a Swedish racing driver who last competed in the GT4 European Series for Schubert Motorsport. A long-term BMW driver, he was International GT Open runner-up in 2017.

== Career ==
Born in Knivsta, Bouveng made his single-seater debut in 2011, racing for Trackstar in the Formula Renault 2.0 Northern European Cup. Another season in the series then followed in 2012, this time with Interwetten.com Racing, in which Bouveng took a best result of fourth at Spa to end the year 22nd in points. Switching to the Volkswagen Scirocco R-Cup for the next two years, Bouveng finished tenth in 2013, before taking six podiums the following year en route to a third-place points finish.

In 2015, Bouveng joined the BMW Motorsport Junior Programme, as he began racing in the VLN Series with Walkenhorst Motorsport. In his first year under the Bavarian marque's wing, Bouveng won the 24 Hours of Nürburgring in the SP8T class, the 12 Hours of Brno in SP3 and made his GT3 debut towards the end of the year. A full season in the SP9 class of the VLN Series then ensued in 2016, in which he took five podiums, before Bouveng joined BMW Team Teo Martín to race in International GT Open. In his only season in the series, Bouveng took wins at the Hungaroring and Le Castellet, and five further podiums to secure runner-up honours overall alongside Fran Rueda.

Remaining in GT3 machinery for 2018, Bouveng switched to BMW Team Schnitzer for his debut season in ADAC GT Masters. Teaming up with Dennis Marschall, Bouveng took a lone third-place finish at the Red Bull Ring to end the year 28th in points. At the end of the year, Bouveng represented Sweden in the only edition of the FIA GT Nations Cup alongside Alexander West. From 2019 to 2023 (with the exception of 2020), Bouveng raced in GT4 Scandinavia, finishing third in the Pro-Am standings in both 2022 and 2023 for M-Bilar Racing.

Following the demise of GT4 Scandinavia, Bouveng switched to BMW-fielding Lestrup Racing Team to race in the GT4 European Series for 2024, in which he took a lone Pro-Am podium alongside Joakim Walde at Spa. Switching to fellow BMW-aligned team Schubert Motorsport for 2025, the pair took four second-place finishes in Pro-Am to end the year fourth in the standings. Continuing with Schubert through 2026, Bouveng and Walde began the season with their maiden class wins at Le Castellet and Spa to take an early lead in points, which they maintained as they clinched the Pro-Am title at season's end with five additional podiums to their name.

== Karting record ==
=== Karting career summary ===
Season	Series	Team	Position
2006	MKR Series Sweden — Formula Micro		48th
2007	MKR Series Sweden — Formula Micro		7th
2008	MKR Series Sweden — Formula Micro		1st
2009	MKR Series Sweden — Rotax Max Junior		2nd
2009	Swedish Cup — Rotax Max Junior		4th
2009	Rotax Max Challenge Sweden — Junior		4th
2010	Rotax Max Winter Cup — Junior Max	Paul Carr Racing	9th
2010	MKR Series Sweden — Rotax Max Junior	Rasbo MK	21st
2010	Swedish Cup — Rotax Max Junior		2nd
2010	Rotax Max Challenge Sweden — Junior		1st
2010	Göteborgs Stora Pris — Rotax Max Junior		1st
2010	RMC Grand Finals — Junior Max		19th

== Racing record ==
=== Racing career summary ===
Season	Series	Team	Races	Wins	Poles	F/Laps	Podiums	Points	Position
2011	Formula Renault 2.0 Northern European Cup	Trackstar	14	0	0	0	0	63	24th
2011	Eurocup Formula Renault 2.0	Trackstar	2	0	0	0	0	0	NC†
2012	Formula Renault 2.0 Northern European Cup	Interwetten.com Racing	18	0	0	0	0	82	22nd
2013	Volkswagen Scirocco R-Cup		9	0	0	0	0	160	10th
2014	Volkswagen Scirocco R-Cup		10	0	0	0	6	295	**3rd**
2015	VLN Series – SP9	Walkenhorst Motorsport	4	0	0	0	1	0	NC
2015	24 Hours of Nürburgring – SP8T	Walkenhorst Motorsport	1	1	0	0	1	—N/a	**1st**
2015	BMW M235i Cup Belgium	Walkenhorst Motorsport	1	0	0	0	0	0	NC
2015	VLN Series – BMW M235i Cup	MPB Racing						28	17th
2015	24H Series – SP3	Walkenhorst Motorsport	1	1	0	0	1	0	NC
2016	VLN Series – SP9	Walkenhorst Motorsport	9	0	0	1	5	0	NC
2016	24 Hours of Nürburgring – SP9	Walkenhorst Motorsport	1	0	0	0	0	—N/a	12th
2017	International GT Open	BMW Team Teo Martín	14	2	3	1	7	106	**2nd**
2017	Porsche Carrera Cup Scandinavia	Mtech Competition	2	0	0	0	2	0	NC†
2018	ADAC GT Masters	BMW Team Schnitzer	13	0	0	0	1	15	28th
2018	FIA GT Nations Cup	Team Sweden	1	0	0	0	0	—N/a	DNF
2019	GT4 Scandinavia – Pro-Am	Eken Motorsport	12	0	3	2	5	131	5th
2021	GT4 Scandinavia – Pro-Am	Lestrup Racing Team	8	1	0	0	2	80	6th
2022	GT4 Scandinavia – Pro-Am	M-Bilar Racing	8	1	0	0	6	128	**3rd**
2023	GT4 Scandinavia – Pro-Am	M-Bilar Racing	10	1	0	0	9	160	**3rd**
2024	GT4 European Series – Pro-Am	Lestrup Racing Team	10	0	0	0	1	59	7th
2025	GT4 Winter Series – Invitational	Schubert Motorsport	3	1	0	0	3	0	NC†
2025	GT4 European Series – Pro-Am	Schubert Motorsport	12	0	0	0	4	109	4th
2026	GT4 European Series – Pro-Am	Schubert Motorsport	12	2	0	0	7	182	**1st**

=== Complete Formula Renault 2.0 NEC results ===
(key) (Races in bold indicate pole position) (Races in italics indicate fastest lap)

Year	Entrant	1	2	3	4	5	6	7	8	9	10	11	12	13	14	15	16	17	18	19	20	DC	Points
2011	Trackstar	HOC; 1	HOC; 2	HOC; 3	SPA; 1; 27	SPA; 2; 33	NÜR; 1; 17	NÜR; 2; 16	ASS; 1; 15	ASS; 2; 16	ASS; 3 Ret	OSC; 1; 16	OSC; 2 Ret	ZAN; 1; 16	ZAN; 2; 12	MST; 1 Ret	MST; 2; 9	MST; 3; 17	MNZ; 1	MNZ; 2	MNZ; 3	24th	63
2012	Interwetten.com Racing	HOC; 1; 13	HOC; 2; 22	HOC; 3; 11	NÜR; 1; 28	NÜR; 2; 16	OSC; 1; 16	OSC; 2 Ret	OSC; 3 Ret	ASS; 1	ASS; 2	RBR; 1; 22	RBR; 2; 14	MST; 1; 17	MST; 2 Ret	MST; 3 Ret	ZAN; 1; 16	ZAN; 2; 9	ZAN; 3; 12	SPA; 1; 22	SPA; 2; 4	22nd	82

=== Complete International GT Open results ===
Year	Team	Car	Class	1	2	3	4	5	6	7	8	9	10	11	12	13	14	Pos.	Points
2017	BMW Team Teo Martín	BMW M6 GT3	Pro	EST; 1; 11	EST; 2; 10	SPA; 1; 2	SPA; 2; 7	LEC; 1; 5	LEC; 2; 1	HUN; 1; 6	HUN; 2; 1	SIL; 1; 9	SIL; 2; 2	MNZ; 1; 4	MNZ; 2; 2	CAT; 1; 4	CAT; 2; 5	2nd	106

=== Complete ADAC GT Masters results ===
(key) (Races in bold indicate pole position; races in italics indicate fastest lap)

Year	Team	Car	1	2	3	4	5	6	7	8	9	10	11	12	13	14	Pos.	Points
2018	BMW Team Schnitzer	BMW M6 GT3	OSC; 1; 15	OSC; 2; 20	MST; 1 DNS	MST; 2 Ret	RBR; 1; 3	RBR; 2; 28	NÜR; 1; 23	NÜR; 2; 29	ZAN; 1; 27	ZAN; 2; 19	SAC; 1; 27	SAC; 2; 16	HOC; 1; 11	HOC; 2; 11	28th	15

=== Complete GT4 European Series results ===
(key) (Races in bold indicate pole position) (Races in italics indicate fastest lap)

Year	Team	Car	Class	1	2	3	4	5	6	7	8	9	10	11	12	Pos	Points
2024	Lestrup Racing Team	BMW M4 GT4 Gen II	Pro-Am	LEC; 1; 24	LEC; 2; 28	MIS; 1; 22	MIS; 2; 16	SPA; 1; 26	SPA; 2; 13	HOC; 1 Ret	HOC; 2 Ret	MNZ; 1; 22	MNZ; 2; 22	JED; 1	JED; 2	7th	59
2025	Schubert Motorsport	BMW M4 GT4 Evo (G82)	Pro-Am	LEC; 1; 20	LEC; 2; 14	ZAN; 1; 27	ZAN; 2; 18	SPA; 1; 17	SPA; 2; 21	MIS; 1; 20	MIS; 2; 10	NÜR; 1; 9	NÜR; 2; 33	CAT; 1; 32	CAT; 2 Ret	4th	109
2026	Schubert Motorsport	BMW M4 GT4 Evo (G82)	Pro-Am	**LEC**; **1**; 10	LEC; 2; 13	MNZ; 1; 6	MNZ; 2; 9	SPA; 1; 8	SPA; 2; 14	MIS; 1; 9	MIS; 2; 16	ZAN; 1; 27	ZAN; 2; 14	POR; 1; 16	POR; 2; 21	1st	182
