= Fran Rueda =

Spanish racing driver (born 1997)

- Rueda at Silverstone Circuit in 2026
- Nationality: (Spain) Spanish
- Born: Francisco Rueda Mateos; 14 February 1997 (age 29) Alhaurín de la Torre, Málaga, Spain
- Categorisation: FIA Silver

Francisco Rueda Mateos (born 14 February 1997 in Alhaurín de la Torre) is a Spanish racing driver who last competed in the LMGT3 class of the European Le Mans Series for Kessel Racing.

== Career ==
Rueda competed in karting from 2008 to 2011, most notably winning the Spanish Karting Championship in the Cadet class in 2009 and finishing runner-up in the same championship's KF3 class in 2011.

Stepping up to single-seaters in 2012, Rueda joined the FFSA Academy centrally-run French F4 Championship. After finishing 13th in the points with a best result of seventh at Lédenon, Rueda stepped up to Formula Renault 2.0 Northern European Cup for 2013 by joining AV Formula. Scoring a best result of sixth in race one at Spa, Rueda finished 24th in the standings on 56 points.

Leaving single-seaters after 2013, Rueda switched to the SEAT León Eurocup for 2014 by joining Monlau Competición. After taking his maiden series podium in his second start at the Nürburgring, Rueda scored points five more times throughout the season to finish eighth in points. Remaining in the SEAT León Eurocup for 2015, Rueda won race two at Le Castellet and Estoril, to finish eighth in points despite missing the final round at Barcelona.

Rueda switched to Renault Sport Trophy for 2016, racing for Team Marc VDS EG 0,0 in the Am class and sharing the car with Tanart Sathienthirakul. Winning in class at the Red Bull Ring, Rueda also won the Le Castellet endurance overall on his way to runner-up honours in the Am class and fifth in the Endurance standings.

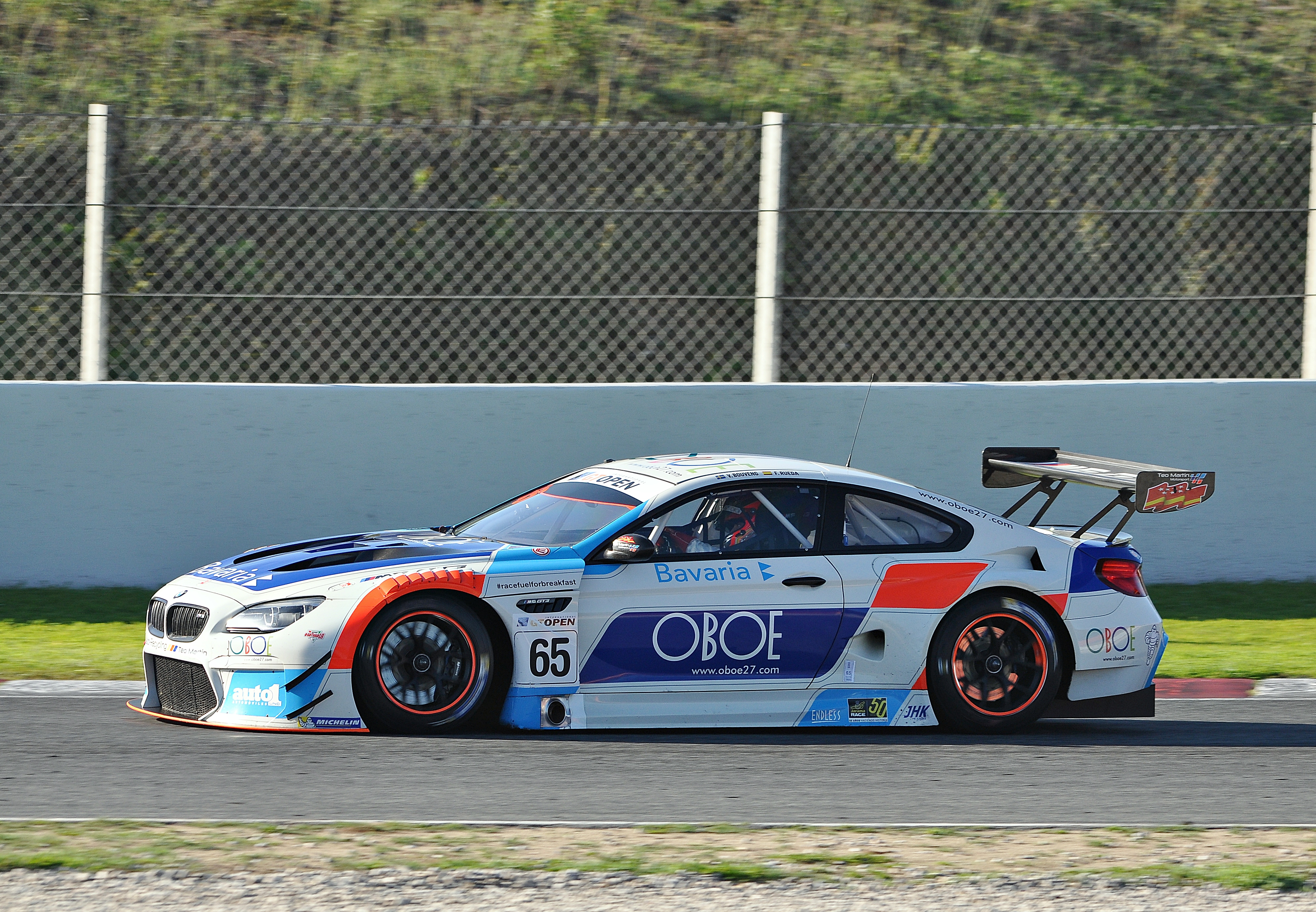
Rueda was International GT Open runner-up two years in succession, 2017 and 2018, with BMW Team Teo Martín.

In 2017, Rueda joined BMW Team Teo Martín to compete in International GT Open alongside Victor Bouveng. Taking his maiden series win in race two at Le Castellet, Rueda won again at the Hungaroring, and scored five more podiums across the season to finish runner-up in points to Giovanni Venturini.

BMW Team Teo Martín retained Rueda for his sophomore season in the series, alongside Andrés Saravia. Taking his first win of the season in wet conditions at Le Castellet, Rueda and Saravia won again in Spa and Monza to finish runner-up in the standings to Mikkel Mac.

The duo returned for a second consecutive season in 2019, as Teo Martín Motorsport switched to the McLaren 720S GT3 and Rueda became a full McLaren junior. Taking his first win of the season at the Hockenheimring, Rueda won again in Spa before winning in Barcelona on his way to fourth in the standings.

Having spent most of 2020 without a seat, Rueda competed on a part-time basis for Teo Martín Motorsport in International GT Open alongside Marcelo Hahn in the Pro-Am class. Taking pole on his return at the Red Bull Ring, Rueda finished second in race one after Reiter Engineering were disqualified after having won the race.

After a year on the sidelines, Rueda returned to racing by competing in International GT Open for Baporo Motorsport alongside Dani Días-Varela. Finishing seventh and sixth in the two races at the Hungaroring, Rueda switched to partnering Andrew Gilbert at Greystone GT for the Red Bull Ring and Monza rounds of the season. At the start of the year, Rueda made a one-off appearance in the Stock Car Pro Series alongside Diego Nunes.

Returning to International GT Open for 2023 and remaining in the Pro-Am class, Rueda and Gilbert competed in the first two rounds for Altitude Racing by Greystone GT, before switching to Altitude Racing by Optimum Motorsport for the rounds in Le Castellet and Red Bull Ring. Finishing in the top-ten in all but one of his final four starts, including a class win at Le Castellet in race two, Rueda finished 25th in the overall standings and eighth in the Pro-Am standings.

Switching to Le Mans Cup for 2024, Rueda joined Ferrari-affiliated Kessel Racing in the GT3 class alongside Andrew Gilbert. Starting off the season by finishing second at Barcelona, Rueda took two more podiums, both being third-place finishes, at Le Castellet and Spa on his way to third in points. Also with the Swiss team, Rueda competed in both the 24H Series and the Gulf 12 Hours, whilst also making two one-off appearances for McLaren-fielding Optimum Motorsport in the British GT Championship and the GT World Challenge Europe Endurance Cup.

Rueda returned to Optimum Motorsport for the 2024–25 Asian Le Mans Series, racing in the GT class alongside Andrew Gilbert and Benjamin Goethe. In the six-race season, Rueda scored his only points in the finale at Yas Marina by finishing fourth and ending the season 17th in points.

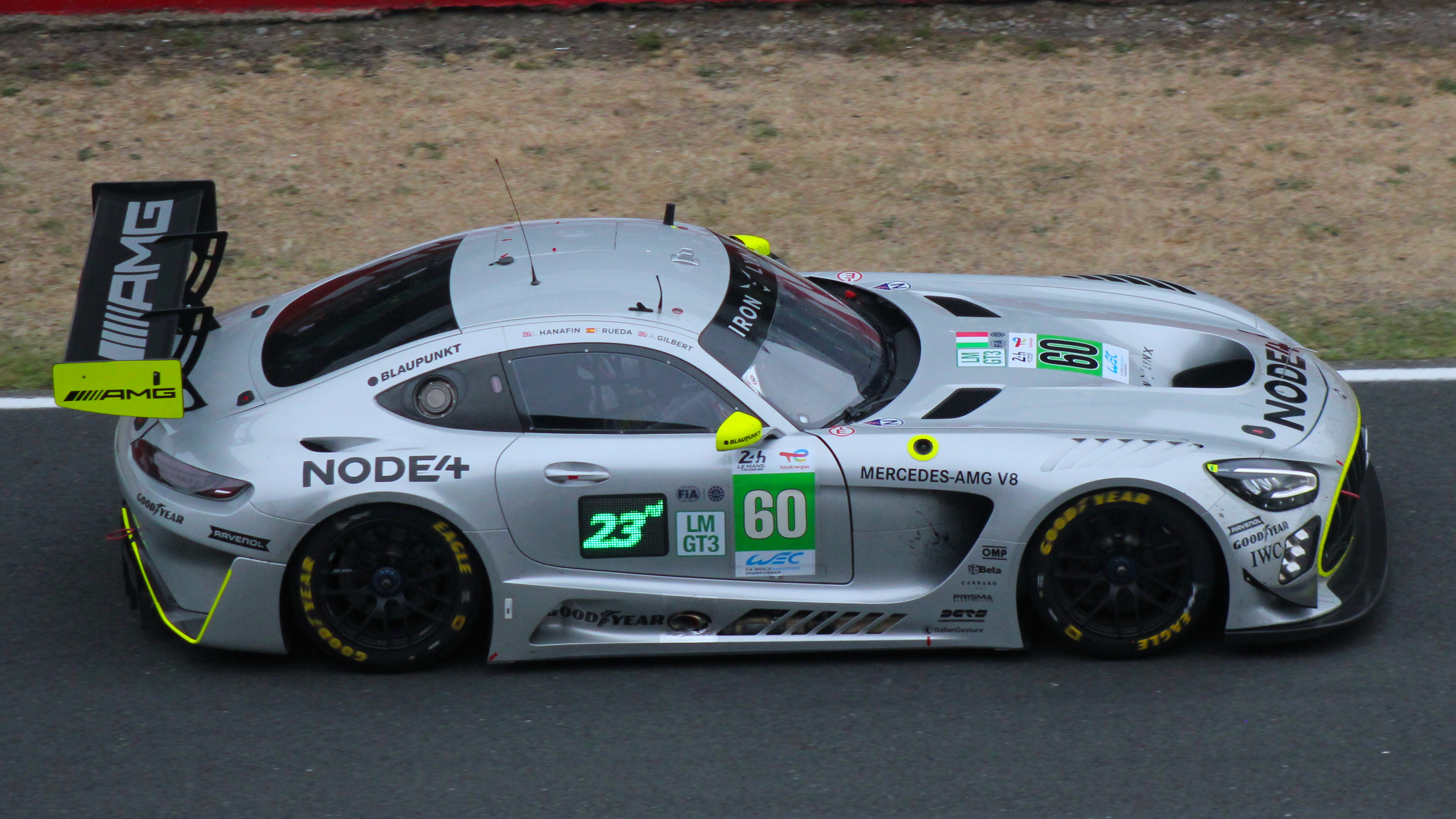
Rueda made his FIA World Endurance Championship debut for Iron Lynx at the 2025 24 Hours of Le Mans.

In 2025, Rueda returned to Kessel Racing to step up to the European Le Mans Series, while remaining in the LMGT3 class as he shared a Ferrari 296 GT3 with Andrew Gilbert and factory driver Miguel Molina. In his maiden season in the series, Rueda took his only podium of the season by finishing second at Imola, helping him secure 12th in the LMGT3 standings. During 2025, Rueda joined Mercedes-aligned Iron Lynx ahead of the 24 Hours of Le Mans to contest the rest of the FIA World Endurance Championship season with them alongside Gilbert and Lorcan Hanafin. In the five races he contested, Rueda scored a best result of tenth at Circuit of the Americas, which turned out to be his only point of the season as he rounded out the year with a 25th-place points finish.

In early 2026, Rueda joined Team WRT to compete at the Dubai 24 Hour, which he won overall alongside Ben Tuck, Anthony McIntosh and BMW works drivers Jordan Pepper and Kelvin van der Linde. For the rest of the year, Rueda returned to Kessel Racing for his second season in the European Le Mans Series with Andrew Gilbert and Romain Leroux, a season in which the trio took a best result of tenth at Imola. During 2026, Rueda also made select appearances in Ferrari machinery in the GTD class of the IMSA SportsCar Championship for Conquest Racing and later deputising for an injured Ollie Millroy at Inception Racing. Towards the end of the year, Rueda partook in the European Le Mans Series rookie tests, sampling TF Sport's Chevrolet Corvette Z06 GT3.R.

== Karting record ==
=== Karting career summary ===
Season	Series	Team	Position
2008	Leon Karting Championship – Minikart		20th
2008	Copa De Campeones – Cadet		7th
2009	Spanish Karting Championship – Cadet		1st
2010	South Garda Winter Cup – KF3	Genikart-LTP	NC
2010	WSK World Series – KF3	Genikart-LTP	23rd
2010	WSK Euro Series – KF3	Genikart-LTP	50th
2010	Karting European Championship – KF3	Genikart-LTP	23rd
2010	Karting World Cup – KF3	Genikart-LTP	NC
2010	WSK Nations Cup – KF3	Genikart-LTP	NC
2010	Spanish Karting Championship – KF3		7th
2011	South Garda Winter Cup – KF3	Genikart-LTP	30th
2011	WSK Master Series – KF3	Genikart-LTP	33rd
2011	Grand Prix Open Karting – KF3	Genikart-LTP	35th
2011	WSK Euro Series – KF3	Genikart-LTP	70th
2011	Spanish Karting Championship – KF3	Genikart-LTP	2nd
2011	Karting World Cup – KF3	Genikart-LTP	30th
2011	Karting European Championship – KF3		27th

== Racing record ==
=== Racing career summary ===
Season	Series	Team	Races	Wins	Poles	F/Laps	Podiums	Points	Position
2012	French F4 Championship	FFSA Academy	14	0	0	0	0	24	13th
2013	Formula Renault 2.0 Northern European Cup	AV Formula	15	0	0	0	0	56	24th
2014	SEAT León Eurocup	Monlau Competición	12	0	0	0	1	24	8th
2015	SEAT León Eurocup	Monlau Competición	12	2	0	0	2	34	8th
2016	Renault Sport Trophy – Am	Team Marc VDS EG 0,0	9	2	2	0	6	147	**2nd**
2016	Renault Sport Trophy – Endurance	Team Marc VDS EG 0,0	6	1	1	0	3	63	5th
2017	International GT Open	BMW Team Teo Martín	14	2	3	1	7	106	**2nd**
2018	International GT Open	BMW Team Teo Martín	14	3	2	3	6	114	**2nd**
2019	International GT Open	Teo Martín Motorsport	13	3	1	0	7	113	4th
2020	International GT Open	Teo Martín Motorsport	4	0	1	0	1	20	11th
2020	International GT Open – Pro-Am	Teo Martín Motorsport	4	1	1	2	2	21	7th
2022	Stock Car Pro Series	Blau Motorsport	1	0	0	0	0	0	NC
2022	International GT Open	Baporo Motorsport	2	0	0	0	0	10	19th
2022	International GT Open	Greystone GT	4	0	0	0	0	10	19th
2022	International GT Open – Pro-Am	Baporo Motorsport	2	0	0	0	0	12	13th
2022	International GT Open – Pro-Am	Greystone GT	4	0	1	0	0	12	13th
2022–23	Middle East Trophy – GT3 Am	7TSIX	1	0	0	0	0	32	NC
2023	International GT Open	Altitude Racing by Greystone GT	3	0	0	0	0	8	25th
2023	International GT Open	Altitude Racing by Optimum Motorsport	4	0	0	0	0	8	25th
2023	International GT Open – Pro-Am	Altitude Racing by Greystone GT	3	0	0	0	0	23	8th
2023	International GT Open – Pro-Am	Altitude Racing by Optimum Motorsport	4	1	2	2	2	23	8th
2023	British GT Championship – GT3	Greystone GT	1	0	0	0	0	0	NC
2023	British GT Championship – GT3 Pro-Am	Greystone GT	1	0	0	0	0	0	NC
2023	GT World Challenge Europe Endurance Cup	Inception Racing	1	0	0	0	0	0	NC
2023	GT World Challenge Europe Endurance Cup – Bronze	Inception Racing	1	0	0	0	0	0	NC
2024	24H Series – GT3 Am	Kessel Racing	1	0	0	0	0	0	NC
2024	Le Mans Cup – GT3	Kessel Racing	7	0	0	1	3	69.5	**3rd**
2024	Gulf 12 Hours	Kessel Racing	1	0	0	0	0	N/A	14th
2024	British GT Championship – GT3	Optimum Motorsport	1	0	0	0	0	0	NC
2024	British GT Championship – GT3 Silver-Am	Optimum Motorsport	1	0	0	0	0	0	NC
2024	GT World Challenge Europe Endurance Cup	Optimum Motorsport	3	0	0	0	0	0	NC
2024	GT World Challenge Europe Endurance Cup – Bronze	Optimum Motorsport	2	0	0	0	0	14	25th
2024–25	Asian Le Mans Series – GT	Optimum Motorsport	6	0	0	0	0	12	17th
2025	European Le Mans Series – LMGT3	Kessel Racing	6	0	0	0	1	27	13th
2025	British GT Championship – GT3	Kessel Racing	1	0	0	0	0	0	NC
2025	British GT Championship – GT3 Silver-Am	Kessel Racing	1	0	0	0	0	0	NC
2025	FIA World Endurance Championship – LMGT3	Iron Lynx	5	0	0	0	0	1	25th
2025–26	24H Series Middle East - GT3	Team WRT	1	1	0	0	1	60	NC
2026	European Le Mans Series – LMGT3	Kessel Racing	6	0	0	0	0	1	32nd
2026	Le Mans Cup – GT3	Biogas Motorsport	1	0	0	0	0	9	19th
2026	IMSA SportsCar Championship – GTD	Conquest Racing	2	0	0	0	0	645	48th
2026	IMSA SportsCar Championship – GTD	Inception Racing	1	0	0	0	0	645	48th

=== Complete French F4 Championship results ===
(key) (Races in bold indicate pole position; races in italics indicate fastest lap)

Year	Team	1	2	3	4	5	6	7	8	9	10	11	12	13	14	DC	Points
2012	FFSA Academy	LÉD; 1; 7	LÉD; 2; 14	PAU; 1; 8	PAU; 2; 7	VDV; 1; 9	VDV; 2; 11	MAG; 1; 11	MAG; 2; 13	NAV; 1; 12	NAV; 2; 8	LMS; 1; 11	LMS; 2; 9	LEC; 1 Ret	LEC; 2; 13	13th	24

=== Complete Formula Renault 2.0 NEC results ===
(key) (Races in bold indicate pole position) (Races in italics indicate fastest lap)

Year	Entrant	1	2	3	4	5	6	7	8	9	10	11	12	13	14	15	16	17	DC	Points
2013	AV Formula	HOC; 1 Ret	HOC; 2; 24	HOC; 3 Ret	NÜR; 1; 19	NÜR; 2; 20	SIL; 1 DNS	SIL; 2; 12	SPA; 1; 6	SPA; 2 Ret	ASS; 1; 15	ASS; 2; 27	MST; 1; 14	MST; 2; 20	MST; 3; 14	ZAN; 1; 22	ZAN; 2; 13	ZAN; 3 C	24th	56

=== Complete International GT Open results ===
Year	Team	Car	Class	1	2	3	4	5	6	7	8	9	10	11	12	13	14	Pos.	Points
2017	BMW Team Teo Martín	BMW M6 GT3	Pro	EST; 1; 11	EST; 2; 10	SPA; 1; 2	SPA; 2; 7	LEC; 1; 5	LEC; 2; 1	HUN; 1; 6	HUN; 2; 1	SIL; 1; 9	SIL; 2; 2	MNZ; 1; 4	MNZ; 2; 2	CAT; 1; 4	CAT; 2; 5	2nd	106
2018	BMW Team Teo Martín	BMW M6 GT3	Pro	EST; 1; 4	EST; 2 Ret	LEC; 1; 1	LEC; 2; 3	SPA; 1; 5	SPA; 2; 1	HUN; 1; 8	HUN; 2; 6	SIL; 1; 3	SIL; 2; 6	MNZ; 1; 1	**MNZ**; **2**; 2	CAT; 1; 12	**CAT**; **2**; 4	2nd	114
2019	Teo Martín Motorsport	McLaren 720S GT3	Pro	LEC; 1; 3	LEC; 2 DNS	HOC; 1; 1	HOC; 2; 14	SPA; 1 Ret	SPA; 2; 1	RBR; 1; 4	RBR; 2; 2	SIL; 1; 5	SIL; 2; 2	CAT; 1; 1	CAT; 2; 8	MNZ; 1; 6	MNZ; 2; 2	4th	113
2020	Teo Martín Motorsport	McLaren 720S GT3	Pro-Am	HUN; 1	HUN; 2	LEC; 1	LEC; 2	**RBR**; **1**; 1	RBR; 2; 3	MNZ; 1	MNZ; 2	SPA; 1; 6	SPA; 2; 5	CAT; 1	CAT; 2			7th	21
2022	Baporo Motorsport	Mercedes-AMG GT3	Pro-Am	EST; 1	EST; 2	LEC; 1	LEC; 2	SPA	HUN; 1; 5	HUN; 2; 4								13th	12
2022	Greystone GT	McLaren 720S GT3	Pro-Am								RBR; 1; 10	RBR; 2; 6	MNZ; 1	MNZ; 2	CAT; 1; 9	CAT; 2; 6		13th	12
2023	Altitude Racing by Greystone GT	McLaren 720S GT3	Pro-Am	ALG; 1; 4	ALG; 2; 7	SPA; 11	HUN; 1	HUN; 2										8th	23
2023	Altitude Racing by Optimum Motorsport	McLaren 720S GT3	Pro-Am						LEC; 1; 3	LEC; 2; 1	RBR; 1; 7	RBR; 2; 5	MNZ; 1	MNZ; 2	CAT; 1	CAT; 2		8th	23

=== Complete GT World Challenge Europe Endurance Cup results ===
Year	Team	Car	Class	1	2	3	4	5	6	7	Pos.	Points
2023	Inception Racing	McLaren 720S GT3 Evo	Bronze	MNZ	LEC	SPA; 6H; Ret	SPA; 12H; Ret	SPA; 24H; Ret	NÜR	CAT	NC	0
2024	Optimum Motorsport	McLaren 720S GT3 Evo	Bronze	LEC	SPA; 6H; 25	SPA; 12H; 37	SPA; 24H; 21	NÜR	MNZ; 36	JED	25th	14

=== Complete Le Mans Cup results ===
(key) (Races in bold indicate pole position; results in italics indicate fastest lap)

Year	Entrant	Class	Car	1	2	3	4	5	6	7	Rank	Points
2024	Kessel Racing	GT3	Ferrari 296 GT3	BAR; 2	LEC; 3	LMS; 1; 14	LMS; 2; 9	SPA; 3	MUG; 8	ALG; 4	3rd	69.5
2026	Biogas Motorsport	GT3	Ferrari 296 GT3 Evo	BAR	LEC	LMS; 10	SPA	SIL	ALG		19th	9

=== Complete Asian Le Mans Series results ===
(key) (Races in bold indicate pole position) (Races in italics indicate fastest lap)

Year	Team	Class	Car	Engine	1	2	3	4	5	6	Pos.	Points
2024–25	Garage 59	GT	McLaren 720S GT3	McLaren M840T 4.0 L Turbo V8	SEP; 1; 14	SEP; 2; 23	DUB; 1; 13	DUB; 2 Ret	ABU; 1 Ret	ABU; 2; 4	17th	12

=== Complete European Le Mans Series results ===
Year	Entrant	Class	Chassis	Engine	1	2	3	4	5	6	Rank	Points
2025	Kessel Racing	LMGT3	Ferrari 296 GT3	Ferrari F163CE 3.0 L Turbo V6	CAT; 10	LEC; Ret	IMO; 2	SPA; 9	SIL; 7	ALG; 12	12th	27
2026	Kessel Racing	LMGT3	Ferrari 296 GT3 Evo	Ferrari F163CE 3.0 L Turbo V6	CAT; 12	LEC; Ret	IMO; 10	SPA; 11	SIL; Ret	ALG; 11	32nd	1

=== Complete FIA World Endurance Championship results ===
(key) (Races in bold indicate pole position; races in italics indicate fastest lap)

Year	Entrant	Class	Chassis	Engine	1	2	3	4	5	6	7	8	Rank	Points
2025	Iron Lynx	LMGT3	Mercedes-AMG GT3 Evo	Mercedes-AMG M159 6.2 L V8	QAT	IMO	SPA	LMS; Ret	SÃO; 15	COA; 10	FUJ; 16	BHR; 13	25th	1

=== Complete 24 Hours of Le Mans results ===
Year	Team	Co-Drivers	Car	Class	Laps	Pos.	Class Pos.
2025	(Italy) Iron Lynx	(United Kingdom) Andrew Gilbert (United Kingdom) Lorcan Hanafin	Mercedes AMG GT3 Evo	LMGT3	57	DNF	DNF

=== Complete IMSA SportsCar Championship results ===
(key) (Races in bold indicate pole position; results in italics indicate fastest lap)

Year	Team	Class	Make	Engine	1	2	3	4	5	6	7	8	9	10	Pos.	Points
2026	Conquest Racing	GTD	Ferrari 296 GT3 Evo	Ferrari F163CE 3.0 L Turbo V6	DAY	SEB	LBH	LGA	WGL; 6	MOS	ELK; 18	VIR	IMS		48th	645
2026	Inception Racing	GTD	Ferrari 296 GT3 Evo	Ferrari F163CE 3.0 L Turbo V6										PET; 8	48th	645
