= GT4 Scandinavia =

Sports car championship

- Category: Grand Tourer (SRO GT4)
- Country: Europe (Sweden) (Norway) (Belgium) (France)
- Inaugural season: 2019
- Folded: 2023
- GT classes: GT4
- Drivers: 14
- Teams: 5
- Tyre suppliers: Pirelli
- Official website: GT4 Scandinavia

GT4 Scandinavia was a sports car championship held in Scandinavia from 2019 to 2023. It was promoted by the SRO Motorsports Group.

It was based on a two-driver concept, which means that an amateur and a professional share a car and drive equally in both qualifying and races. The two classes were Pro/Am and Am/Am. In the former, each car was shared between a gold or silver driver and a bronze dirver. In the Am/Am class, each car was shared by two bronze drivers.

The series featured GT4 cars including the Alpine (A110 GT4), Audi (R8 LMS GT4), BMW (M4 GT4), Ginetta (G55 GT4), Maserati (Gran Turismo MC GT4), McLaren ( 570S GT4), Mercedes (AMG GT4) and Porsche (Cayman GT4, 911 GT3 Cup – 997 – GT4). GT4 Scandinavia shared the same Balance of Performance (BoP) rules as other GT4 series, which means that the cars' performance is equalized by balancing, for example, weight, engine power and ride height. Pirelli was the common tire supplier. Each race was between 50 and 60 minutes long, with a mandatory pit stop for a driver change.

Due to the limited shortage of entrants, the championship was cancelled for 2024.

The GT4 formula returns to the Nordics in 2027 as STCC returns with GT4 as regulations under the STCC GT4 Nordic banner in a cooperation with SRO Motorsports.

== Circuits ==
- (Sweden) Ring Knutstorp (2019)
- (Sweden) Scandinavian Raceway (2019, 2021–2023)
- (Sweden) Drivecenter Arena (2019, 2021–2022)
- (Sweden) Gelleråsen Arena (2019–2022)
- (Norway) Rudskogen Motorsenter (2019, 2023)
- (Sweden) Mantorp Park (2019–2020, 2023)
- (Belgium) Circuit de Spa-Francorchamps (2022–2023)
- (France) Circuit Paul Ricard (2023)

== Entry List 2023 ==
Team	Car	No.	Drivers	Class	Rounds
(Sweden) Otto Racing	Porsche 718 Cayman GT4 RS Clubsport	204	(Sweden) Otto Gulberg	PA	2
(Sweden) Otto Racing	Porsche 718 Cayman GT4 RS Clubsport	204	(Sweden) Daniel Nilsson	PA	2
(Sweden) RMS	Mercedes-AMG GT4	221	(Sweden) Håkan Ricknas	Am	1–2
(Sweden) RMS	Mercedes-AMG GT4	221	(Sweden) Calle Ward	Am	1–2
Toyota Gazoo Racing Sweden	Toyota GR Supra GT4	229	(Sweden) Niclas Hagberg	PA	1–2
Toyota Gazoo Racing Sweden	Toyota GR Supra GT4	229	(Sweden) Rasmus Hedberg	PA	1–2
Toyota Gazoo Racing Sweden	Toyota GR Supra GT4 Evo	255	(Sweden) Mikael Brunnhagen	PA	1–2
Toyota Gazoo Racing Sweden	Toyota GR Supra GT4 Evo	255	(Sweden) Andreas Ahlberg	PA	1–2
Toyota Gazoo Racing Sweden	Toyota GR Supra GT4 Evo	290	(Sweden) Hans Holmlund	PA	1–2
Toyota Gazoo Racing Sweden	Toyota GR Supra GT4 Evo	290	(Sweden) Emil Skärås	PA	1–2
(Sweden) Race Team Gelleråsen by AFR	Porsche 718 Cayman GT4 RS Clubsport	278	(Sweden) Gustav Bard	Am	1–2
(Sweden) Race Team Gelleråsen by AFR	Porsche 718 Cayman GT4 RS Clubsport	278	(Sweden) Patrik Skoog	Am	1–2
(Sweden) ALFAB Racing	McLaren Artura GT4	288	(Sweden) Erik Behrens	PA	1–2
(Sweden) ALFAB Racing	McLaren Artura GT4	288	(Sweden) Daniel Roos	PA	1–2
(Sweden) M-Bilar Racing	BMW M4 GT4 Gen II	298	(Sweden) Victor Bouveng	PA	1–2
(Sweden) M-Bilar Racing	BMW M4 GT4 Gen II	298	(Sweden) Joakim Walde	PA	1–2

Icon	Class
PA	Pro-Am Cup
Am	Am Cup

== Championship standings ==
Race format

The weekend comprises two races, each lasting between 50 and 60 minutes plus one additional lap. Race 1 is determined by the qualifying results of the PRO-drivers in Q1, while Race 2 is based on the qualifying results of the AM-drivers in Q2. Each race includes a mandatory pit stop for a driver change.

Scoring system

Position	1st	2nd	3rd	4th	5th	6th	7th	8th	9th	10th
Points	25	18	15	12	10	8	6	4	2	1

== Standings 2023 ==
=== TOP 3 Pro-Am Drivers' Cup ===
Pos.	Drivers	Team	MAN (Sweden)		LEC (France)		SPA (Belgium)		RUD (Norway)		AND (Sweden)		Points
1	(Sweden) Hans Holmlund (Sweden) Emil Skärås	Toyota Gazoo Racing Sweden	2	2	4	1	1	1	4	1	1	1	210
2	(Sweden) Erik Behrens (Sweden) Daniel Roos	(Sweden) ALFAB Racing	1	1	2	2	6	2	1	2	2	2	191
3	(Sweden) Victor Bouveng (Sweden) Joakim Walde	(Sweden) M-Bilar Racing	3	3	1	3	2	3	3	3	4	3	160

=== TOP 3 Am Drivers' Cup ===
Pos.	Drivers	Team	MAN (Sweden)		LEC (France)		SPA (Belgium)		RUD (Norway)		AND (Sweden)		Points
1	(Sweden) Håkan Ricknäs (Sweden) Calle Ward	(Sweden) RMS	2	1	1	2	1	2	2	2	1	1	215
2	(Sweden) Gustav Bard (Sweden) Patrik Skoog	(Sweden) Race Team Gelleråsen By AFR	1	2	2	1	2	1	1	Ret	2	2	190
3	(Sweden) Mikael Brunnhagen (Sweden) Christoffer Brunnhagen	Toyota Gazoo Racing Sweden							3	1	3	3	70

== Standings 2022 ==
=== TOP 3 Pro-Am Drivers' Cup ===
Pos.	Drivers	Team	AND (Sweden)		SKE (Sweden)		SPA (Belgium)		AND (Sweden)		GEL (Sweden)		Points
1	(Sweden) Daniel Roos (Sweden) Erik Behrens	(Sweden) ALFAB Racing	1	2	1	1	1	Ret	2	1	1	2	204
2	(Sweden) Emil Skärås (Sweden) Hans Holmlund	Toyota Gazoo Racing Sweden	2	Ret	2	3	2	1	1	3	2	1	177
3	(Sweden) Victor Bouveng (Sweden) Joakim Walde	(Sweden) M-Bilar Racing	3	1	4	2	5	3	3	2	DNS	DNS	128

== Championship Standings 2021 ==
=== TOP 3 PRO/AM Drivers' Championship ===
Pos.	Drivers	Team	SKE (Sweden)		GEL (Sweden)		AND (Sweden)		MAN (Sweden)		Points
1	(Sweden) Emil Skärås (Sweden) Hans Holmlund	Toyota Gazoo Racing Sweden	3	1	1	2	DSQ	1	1	4	145
2	(Sweden) Daniel Roos (Sweden) Erik Behrens	(Sweden) ALFAB Racing	2	2	7	1	1	5	2	2	138
3	(Norway) Magnus Gustavsen	(Sweden) J-Tech	5	4	2	3	4	3	3	Ret	97

== Championship Standings 2020 ==
=== TOP 3 Drivers' Cup ===
Pos.	Drivers	Team	GEL (Sweden)		MAN (Sweden)		Points
1	(Sweden) Gustav Bard (Sweden) Marcus Annervi	(Sweden) Race Team Gelleråsen By AFR	3	1	1	2	83
2	(Sweden) Håkan Ricknäs (Sweden) Philip Forsman	(Sweden) RMS	1	2	2	4	73
3	(Italy) Matteo “Babalus” Santoponte (Sweden) Christian Hobohm	(Sweden) Lights2Flag	2	3	7	7	45

== Championship Standings 2019 ==
=== TOP 3 Pro-Am Drivers' Cup ===
Pos.	Drivers	Team	KNU (Sweden)		AND (Sweden)		SKE (Sweden)		GEL (Sweden)		RUD (Norway)		MAN (Sweden)		Points
1	(Sweden) Daniel Roos (Sweden) Erik Behrens	(Sweden) ALFAB Racing	5	9	4	Ret	1	2	2	1	1	2	2	10	172
2	(Sweden) Oliver Söderström (Sweden) Robert Serwanski	(Sweden) Förenade Bill AB	1	1	6	1	2	1	5	DSQ	Ret	4	8	5	162
3	(Sweden) Marcus Annervi	(Sweden) Race Team Gellerasen - Porsche Center Örebro	2	5	2	3	4	8	3	DSQ	4	1	4	3	156
