= 2016 VLN Series =

Motorsport season

The 2016 VLN Series was the 39th season of the VLN.

The drivers championship was won by Alexander Mies and Michael Schrey, driving a BMW M235i Racing Cup for Bonk-Motorsport.

== Calendar ==
Rnd.	Race	Length	Circuit	Date
1	62. ADAC Westfalenfahrt	4 hours	(Germany) Nürburgring Nordschleife	April 2
2	41. DMV 4-Stunden-Rennen	4 hours	(Germany) Nürburgring Nordschleife	April 30
3	58. ADAC ACAS H&R-Cup	4 hours	(Germany) Nürburgring Nordschleife	May 14
4	47. Adenauer ADAC Deutsche Payment-Trophy	4 hours	(Germany) Nürburgring Nordschleife	June 25
5	56. ADAC Reinoldus-Langstreckenrennen	4 hours	(Germany) Nürburgring Nordschleife	July 16
6	39. RCM DMV Grenzlandrennen	4 hours	(Germany) Nürburgring Nordschleife	August 20
7	ROWE 6 Stunden ADAC Ruhr-Pokal-Rennen	6 hours	(Germany) Nürburgring Nordschleife	September 3
8	48. ADAC Barbarossapreis	4 hours	(Germany) Nürburgring Nordschleife	September 24
9	DMV 250-Meilen-Rennen	4 hours	(Germany) Nürburgring Nordschleife	October 8
10	41. DMV Münsterlandpokal	4 hours	(Germany) Nürburgring Nordschleife	October 22

== Race results ==
Results indicate overall winners only.

Rnd	Circuit	Pole position	Winners
1	(Germany) Nürburgring Nordschleife	No. 28 (Germany) Land-Motorsport	No. 5 (Germany) Phoenix Racing
1	(Germany) Nürburgring Nordschleife	(Germany) Marc Basseng (United States) Connor De Phillippi (Germany) Mike Rockenfeller (Germany) Timo Scheider	(Germany) Frank Stippler (Denmark) Anders Fjordbach
2	(Germany) Nürburgring Nordschleife	No. 6 (Germany) Black Falcon	No. 5 (Germany) Phoenix Racing
2	(Germany) Nürburgring Nordschleife	(Germany) Bernd Schneider (Germany) Maro Engel (United Kingdom) Adam Christodoulou (Switzerland) Manuel Metzger	(Germany) Frank Stippler (Denmark) Anders Fjordbach
3	(Germany) Nürburgring Nordschleife	No. 31 (Germany) Schubert Motorsport	No. 31 (Germany) Schubert Motorsport
3	(Germany) Nürburgring Nordschleife	(Germany) Jörg Müller (Germany) Marco Wittmann (Finland) Jesse Krohn	(Germany) Jörg Müller (Germany) Marco Wittmann (Finland) Jesse Krohn
4	(Germany) Nürburgring Nordschleife	No. 28 (Germany) Land-Motorsport	No. 28 (Germany) Land-Motorsport
4	(Germany) Nürburgring Nordschleife	(Germany) Christopher Mies (United States) Connor De Phillippi	(Germany) Christopher Mies (United States) Connor De Phillippi
5	(Germany) Nürburgring Nordschleife	No. 28 (Germany) Land-Motorsport	No. 28 (Germany) Land-Motorsport
5	(Germany) Nürburgring Nordschleife	(United States) Connor De Phillippi (Germany) Christopher Mies	(United States) Connor De Phillippi (Germany) Christopher Mies
6	(Germany) Nürburgring Nordschleife	No. 36 (Germany) Walkenhorst Motorsport	No. 8 (Germany) HARIBO Racing Team
6	(Germany) Nürburgring Nordschleife	(Norway) Christian Krognes (Sweden) Victor Bouveng (Germany) Jörg Müller	(Germany) Uwe Alzen (Germany) Lance David Arnold (Germany) Jan Seyffarth
7	(Germany) Nürburgring Nordschleife	No. 7 (Germany) Black Falcon	No. 911 (Germany) Manthey Racing
7	(Germany) Nürburgring Nordschleife	(Netherlands) "Gerwin" (Netherlands) Yelmer Buurman (Germany) Hubert Haupt (Switzerland) Manuel Metzger	(France) Patrick Pilet (Germany) Jörg Bergmeister
8	(Germany) Nürburgring Nordschleife	No. 36 (Germany) Walkenhorst Motorsport	No. 8 (Germany) HARIBO Racing Team
8	(Germany) Nürburgring Nordschleife	(Norway) Christian Krognes (Finland) Jesse Krohn (Sweden) Victor Bouveng	(Germany) Uwe Alzen (Germany) Lance David Arnold
9	(Germany) Nürburgring Nordschleife	No. 30 (Germany) Frikadelli Racing Team	No. 552 (Germany) Farnbacher Racing
9	(Germany) Nürburgring Nordschleife	(Netherlands) Patrick Huisman (Austria) Norbert Siedler	(Germany) Dominik Farnbacher (Germany) Mario Farnbacher
10	(Germany) Nürburgring Nordschleife	No. 45 (Belgium) BMW TEAM RBM	No. 28 (Germany) Land-Motorsport
10	(Germany) Nürburgring Nordschleife	(Germany) Jörg Müller (Germany) Nico Menzel	(United States) Connor De Phillippi (Germany) Christopher Mies

== See also ==
- 2016 24 Hours of Nürburgring

== Bibliography ==
- Jörg Hildebrand & Hasso Jacoby. Grüne Hölle 2016: Die Langstreckenrennen auf dem Nürburgring (in German). Weiss Verlag. ISBN 978-3-923632-22-0.
