= Alessandro Latif =

British/Italian race car driver (born 1996)

Alessandro Guido Latif
- Nationality: (United Kingdom) British (Italy) Italian
- Born: 11 April 1996 (age 30) London, England

Blancpain Sprint Series career
- Current team: Phoenix Racing, Flying Lizard Motorsports
- Categorisation: FIA Silver
- Car number: 5
- Former teams: Avelon Formula, Atech Grand Prix

Previous series
- V de V Proto Endurance Challenge, SPEED Euroseries, Formula Renault Eurocup, Formula Renault 2.0 Alps

Alessandro Guido Latif (born 11 April 1996 in London, England) is a retired British-Italian racing driver. Latif is the youngest race winner of a V de V Proto Endurance Challenge race. In 2014, he competed in the Blancpain Sprint Series driving for Phoenix Racing, the Daytona 24 Hours and Sebring 12 Hours driving an Audi R8 LMS for Flying Lizard Motorsports. Latif's early career involved an upbringing in karts and Formula Renault 2.0.

== Early life ==
Latif was born on 11 April 1996 in London, England. His father is Pakistani born and mother is Italian, both whom currently reside in London, England. Latif started in karting at aged 11.

== Racing career ==
=== Karts ===
Latif's karting career began in 2007 where he rose up the ranks to race in the international scene. As well as developing his race craft he achieved notable success in British and European events, as well as in World Karting.

=== Single Seaters ===
In 2012, Latif moved to Formula Renault 2.0 Eurocup and Formula Renault 2.0 Alps driving for Atech Grand Prix completing eight races.

=== Sports car racing ===
Latif signed with Avelon Formula to drive a CN2 (per the Group CN classification) Sports prototype in the V de V Proto Endurance Challenge for the remainder of the 2012 season, where he won his inaugural race in the 4 Heures du Castellet.

In 2013, Latif remained with Avelon Formula in the V de V Proto Endurance Challenge, while also competing in the opening rounds of the SPEED Euroseries. Latif won the 6 Hours of Mugello with teammate Ivan Bellarosa in front of the team's home crowd. They later went on to win the opening rounds of the Speed Euroseries at the Hungaroring.

In 2014, Latif signed with Flying Lizard Motorsports to race at the Daytona 24 Hours in the number 35 Audi R8 LMS, where they finished fifth in the GTD class.

Latif competed in the 2014 12 Hours Sebring in Florida on 12–15 March, where they finished eighth in the GTD class.

Latif joined Phoenix Racing for Blancpain Sprint Series alongside Marc Basseng.

Latif was set to race a Nissan Zytec in the 24 Hours of Le Mans race on 14–15 June with the Greaves Motorsport Team. However, after starting 26th on the 54-car grid, the team achieved a top-ten position before their efforts were thwarted after a blameless collision by a co-driver on lap 31 ended the race for them.

== Karting record ==
=== Karting career summary ===
Season	Series	Team	Position
2009	Kartmasters British GP - Mini Max		25th
2009	Super One Series - Mini Max		21st
2009	Super One Series - Rotax Junior		46th
2009	Shenington Kart Club - Rotax Mini Max		11th
2010	Rotax Max Wintercup - Junior Max		31st
2010	Super One Series - Rotax Junior		29th
2010	Rotax International Open - Junior		4th
2010	Kartmasters British GP - Rotax Junior		30th
2011	Euro Wintercup - Rotax Max Junior		15th
2011	Rotax Max Wintercup - Junior Max	Protrain Racing	4th
2011	Rotax Max Euro Trophy - Junior Max	Protrain Racing	28th
2011	CIK-FIA U18 World Championship		27th
2011	WSK Final Cup - KF2		19th
2011	Super One Series - Rotax Junior		24th
2011	BNL Karting Series - Rotax Max Junior		24th
2011	Kartmasters British GP - Rotax Junior		31st

== Racing record ==
=== Racing career summary ===
Season	Series	Team	Races	Wins	Poles	F/Laps	Podiums	Points	Positions
2012	Speed EuroSeries	G-Cat Racing	4	0	0	0	0	25	23rd
2012	Formula Renault 2.0 Eurocup	Atech Reid GP	6	0	0	0	0	0	43rd
2012	Formula Renault 2.0 Alps	Atech Reid GP	4	0	0	0	0	0	43rd
2013	V de V Michelin Endurance Series - Challenge Endurance GT/Tourisme V de V	Avalon Formula	1	0	0	0	0	0	NC
2013	Gulf 12 Hours - CN2	BF Motorsport	1	0	1	0	0	0	NC
2013	Speed EuroSeries	Avelon Formula	2	2	0	0	2	34	4th
2013	V de V Challenge Endurance - Proto - Scratch	Avelon Formula	5	1	0	0	1	52.5	16th
2014	Blancpain Sprint Series - Pro-Am Trophy	Phoenix Racing	10	8	0	0	10	162	1st
2014	Le Mans 24h - LMP2	Greaves Motorsport	1	0	0	0	0	0	DNF
2014	Blancpain GT Series Sprint Cup	Phoenix Racing	12	0	0	0	0	14	18th
2014	IMSA SportsCar Championship - GTD	Flying Lizard Motorsports	3	0	0	0	0	71	35th
2015	Formula Car Challenge - West Coast Region - FormulaSPEED2.0	?	2	0	1	1	1	44	9th
2015	Pro Mazda Championship	World Speed Motorsports	16	0	0	0	0	140	13th
2015	Cooper Tires Winterfest - Pro Mazda	M1 Autosport	5	0	0	0	0	67	10th
2015	Bathurst 12 Hours	Jamec Pen Racing	?	?	?	?	?	0	13th
2015	Bathurst 12 Hour Race - Class A: GT3 Am	Jamec Pen Racing	1	0	0	0	0	0	5th
2016	Porsche Carrera Cup Great Britain	GT Marques	16	0	0	0	0	83	10th

=== Complete Eurocup Formula Renault 2.0 results ===
(key) (Races in bold indicate pole position; races in italics indicate fastest lap)

Year	Entrant	1	2	3	4	5	6	7	8	9	10	11	12	13	14	DC	Points
2012	Atech Reid GP	ALC; 1; 23	ALC; 2; 27	SPA; 1; 35	SPA; 2; 27	NÜR; 1; 30	NÜR; 2; 20	MSC; 1	MSC; 2	HUN; 1	HUN; 2	LEC; 1	LEC; 2	CAT; 1	CAT; 2	43rd	0

=== Complete Formula Renault 2.0 Alps Series results ===
(key) (Races in bold indicate pole position; races in italics indicate fastest lap)

Year	Team	1	2	3	4	5	6	7	8	9	10	11	12	13	14	Pos	Points
2012	Atech Reid GP	MNZ; 1; 20	MNZ; 2; 24	PAU; 1	PAU; 2	IMO; 1	IMO; 2	SPA; 1	SPA; 2	RBR; 1	RBR; 2	MUG; 1	MUG; 2	CAT; 1	CAT; 2	43rd	0

=== Complete Blancpain Sprint Series results ===
(key) (Races in bold indicate pole position; races in italics indicate fastest lap)

Year	Team	Car	Class	1	2	3	4	5	6	7	8	9	10	11	12	13	14	Pos.	Points
2014	Phoenix Racing	Audi R8 LMS ultra	Pro	NOG; QR; 10	NOG; CR; 9	BRH; QR; 13	BRH; CR; 11	ZAN; QR; 10	ZAN; CR; 13	SVK; QR; 8	SVK; CR; 7	ALG; QR; 11	ALG; CR; 7	ZOL; QR; 15	ZOL; CR; 15	BAK; QR; DNS	BAK; CR; DNS	18th	14
2014	Phoenix Racing	Audi R8 LMS ultra	Pro-Am Trophy			BRH; QR; 13	BRH; CR; 11	**ZAN**; **QR**; 10	ZAN; CR; 13	SVK; QR; 8	SVK; CR; 7	ALG; QR; 11	ALG; CR; 7	**ZOL**; **QR**; 15	ZOL; CR; 15	**BAK**; **QR**; DNS	BAK; CR; DNS	1st	162

=== 24 Hours of Le Mans results ===
Year	Team	Co-Drivers	Car	Class	Laps	Pos.	Class Pos.
2014	(United Kingdom) Greaves Motorsport	(United Kingdom) Michael Munemann (United Kingdom) James Winslow	Zytek Z11SN-Nissan	LMP2	31	DNF	DNF

=== Complete IMSA SportsCar Championship results ===
(key) (Races in bold indicate pole position; results in italics indicate fastest lap)

Year	Team	Class	Make	Engine	1	2	3	4	5	6	7	8	9	10	11	Pos.	Points
2014	Flying Lizard Motorsports	GTD	Audi R8 LMS ultra	Audi 5.2 L V10 V10	DAY; 5	SEB; 8	LGA	BEL	WGL	MOS	IMS	ROA	VIR	COTA	ATL; 12	35th	71

=== Compete Pro Mazda Championship results ===
(key) (Races in bold indicate pole position; races in italics indicate fastest lap)

Year	Team	1	2	3	4	5	6	7	8	9	10	11	12	13	14	15	16	17	Rank	Points
2015	World Speed Motorsports	STP; 9	STP; 17	LOU; 10	LOU; C	BAR; 12	BAR; 12	IMS; 13	IMS; 14	IMS; 14	LOR; 10	TOR; 9	TOR; 13	IOW; 13	MOH; 14	MOH; 11	LAG; 12	LAG; 15	13th	140

=== Complete Porsche Carrera Cup Great Britain results ===
(key) (Races in bold indicate pole position) (Races in italics indicate fastest lap)

Year	Team	1	2	3	4	5	6	7	8	9	10	11	12	13	14	15	16	DC	Points
2016	GT Marques	BHI; 1 Ret	BHI; 2; 12	SILGP; 1; 15	SILGP; 2; 9	OUL; 1; 8	OUL; 2; 22	CRO; 1; 10	CRO; 2; 23	SNE; 1; 8	SNE; 2; 13	KNO; 1; 12	KNO; 2; 5	SILN; 1; 6	SILN; 2; 8	BHGP; 1; 5	BHGP; 2 Ret	10th	83
