= 2016 Porsche Carrera Cup Great Britain =

The 2016 Porsche Carrera Cup Great Britain was a multi-event, one-make motor racing championship held across England and Scotland. The championship featured a mix of professional motor racing teams and privately funded drivers, competing in Porsche 911 GT3 cars that conformed to the technical regulations for the championship. It formed part of the extensive program of support categories built up around the BTCC centrepiece. The 2016 season was the fourteenth Porsche Carrera Cup Great Britain season, commencing on 3 April at Brands Hatch – on the circuit's Indy configuration – and finished on 2 October at the same venue, utilising the Grand Prix circuit, after sixteen races at eight meetings. Fourteen of the races were held in support of the 2016 British Touring Car Championship season, with a round in support of the 2016 FIA World Endurance Championship season.

== Entry list ==
Team	No.	Driver	Rounds
Pro
Redline Racing (Note: Cars No. 1, 28, 33 & 44 entered as Redline Racing and cars No. 15 & 77 entered as Team Redline.)	1	(United Kingdom) Dan Cammish	All
Redline Racing	15	(United Kingdom) Tom Oliphant	All
Redline Racing	28	(Republic of Ireland) Charlie Eastwood	All
Redline Racing	77	(United Kingdom) Lewis Plato	All
Team Parker Racing	5	(United Kingdom) Stephen Jelley	All
Team Parker Racing	45	(United Kingdom) Bradley Ellis	4
Juta Racing	8	(Lithuania) Jonas Gelžinis	All
IDL Racing	10	(United Kingdom) Tom Sharp	All
GT Marques	19	(Italy) Alessandro Latif	All
GT Marques	88	(United Kingdom) Dino Zamparelli	All
IN2 Racing	32	(United Kingdom) Daniel Lloyd	7-8
Pro-Am 1
Team Parker Racing	7	(United Kingdom) Justin Sherwood	All
Parr Motorsport	29	(Singapore) Sean Hudspeth	All
G-Cat Racing	30	(United Kingdom) Peter Jennings	1–4, 8
G-Cat Racing	76	(United Kingdom) Greg Caton	5
Redline Racing	33	(United Kingdom) John McCullagh (Note: Participated in practice and qualifying in the Pro-Am 2 class, at Round 1 at Brands Hatch before being upgraded to the Pro-Am 1 class for rest off the season.)	All
IN2 Racing	81	(United Kingdom) Euan McKay	All
IN2 Racing	91	(United Kingdom) Daniel McKay	All
Pro-Am 2
IN2 Racing	2	(United Kingdom) Mark Cowne	5
IN2 Racing	34	(Turkey) Salih Yoluc	2
The Car Loan Centre	4	(United Kingdom) Peter Parsons	1–5, 8
Juta Racing	13	(Lithuania) Tautvydas Barštys	All
Intersport Racing	17	(United Kingdom) Mark Radcliffe	All
Parr Motorsport	22	(United Kingdom) Peter Kyle-Henney	All
Asset Advantage Race Team	23	(United Kingdom) Iain Dockerill	1–5, 7-8
G-Cat Racing	31	(United Kingdom) Shamus Jennings	All
Redline Racing	44	(United Kingdom) Barrie Baxter	All
Team Parker Racing	46	(United Kingdom) Adrian Barwick	2–3, 5
Team Parker Racing	49	(United Kingdom) Rupert Martin	1–7
Guest
Team Parker Racing	36	(Republic of Ireland) Karl Leonard	8
Privateer	40	(United Kingdom) Graeme Mundy	2

== Race calendar and results ==
The calendar was announced by the championship organisers on 30 November 2015.

Round		Circuit	Date	Pole position	Fastest lap	Winning driver	Winning team
1	R1	Brands Hatch (Indy Circuit, Kent)	3 April	(United Kingdom) Dan Cammish	(United Kingdom) Dino Zamparelli	(United Kingdom) Dino Zamparelli	GT Marques
1	R2	Brands Hatch (Indy Circuit, Kent)	3 April	(United Kingdom) Dan Cammish	(United Kingdom) Dino Zamparelli	(United Kingdom) Dan Cammish	Redline Racing
2	R3	Silverstone Circuit (Grand Prix Circuit, Northamptonshire)	16 April	(United Kingdom) Dan Cammish	(United Kingdom) Dan Cammish	(United Kingdom) Dan Cammish	Redline Racing
2	R4	Silverstone Circuit (Grand Prix Circuit, Northamptonshire)	17 April	(United Kingdom) Dan Cammish	(United Kingdom) Dino Zamparelli	(United Kingdom) Dan Cammish	Redline Racing
3	R5	Oulton Park (Island Circuit, Cheshire)	4 June	(United Kingdom) Dan Cammish	(United Kingdom) Dan Cammish	(United Kingdom) Dan Cammish	Redline Racing
3	R6	Oulton Park (Island Circuit, Cheshire)	5 June	(United Kingdom) Dan Cammish	(United Kingdom) Dan Cammish	(United Kingdom) Dan Cammish	Redline Racing
4	R7	Croft Circuit (North Yorkshire)	19 June	(United Kingdom) Dino Zamparelli	(United Kingdom) Dino Zamparelli	(United Kingdom) Dino Zamparelli	GT Marques
4	R8	Croft Circuit (North Yorkshire)	19 June	(United Kingdom) Dino Zamparelli	(United Kingdom) Dino Zamparelli	(United Kingdom) Dino Zamparelli	GT Marques
5	R9	Snetterton Circuit (300 Circuit, Norfolk)	31 July	(United Kingdom) Dan Cammish	(Republic of Ireland) Charlie Eastwood	(United Kingdom) Dan Cammish	Redline Racing
5	R10	Snetterton Circuit (300 Circuit, Norfolk)	31 July	(United Kingdom) Dan Cammish	(United Kingdom) Dan Cammish	(United Kingdom) Dan Cammish	Redline Racing
6	R11	Knockhill Racing Circuit (Fife)	14 August	(United Kingdom) Dan Cammish	(United Kingdom) Dan Cammish	(United Kingdom) Dan Cammish	Redline Racing
6	R12	Knockhill Racing Circuit (Fife)	14 August	(United Kingdom) Dan Cammish	(United Kingdom) Dan Cammish	(United Kingdom) Dan Cammish	Redline Racing
7	R13	Silverstone Circuit (National Circuit, Northamptonshire)	18 September	(United Kingdom) Dan Cammish	(United Kingdom) Dan Cammish	(United Kingdom) Dan Cammish	Redline Racing
7	R14	Silverstone Circuit (National Circuit, Northamptonshire)	18 September	(United Kingdom) Dan Cammish	(United Kingdom) Stephen Jelley	(United Kingdom) Dan Cammish	Redline Racing
8	R15	Brands Hatch (Grand Prix Circuit, Kent)	2 October	(Republic of Ireland) Charlie Eastwood	(United Kingdom) Dan Cammish	(Republic of Ireland) Charlie Eastwood	Redline Racing
8	R16	Brands Hatch (Grand Prix Circuit, Kent)	2 October	(United Kingdom) Dan Cammish	(United Kingdom) Dan Cammish	(United Kingdom) Dan Cammish	Redline Racing

== Championship standings ==
Points system
	**1st**	**2nd**	**3rd**	**4th**	**5th**	**6th**	**7th**	**8th**	**9th**	**10th**	**11th**	**12th**	**13th**	**14th**	**15th**	PP	FL
Finishers	20	18	16	14	12	10	9	8	7	6	5	4	3	2	1	1	1
Pro-Am	10	9	8	7	6	5	4	3	2	1						1	1

=== Drivers' championships ===
==== Overall championship ====
Pos	Driver	BHI		SILGP		OUL		CRO		SNE		KNO		SILN		BHGP		Pts
1	(United Kingdom) Dan Cammish	**2**	**1**	**1**	**1**	**1**	**1**	7	2	**1**	**1**	**1**	**1**	**1**	**1**	8	**1**	313
2	(United Kingdom) Dino Zamparelli	1	2	2	2	5	3	**1**	**1**	6	3	6	6	5	3	3	2	257
3	(Republic of Ireland) Charlie Eastwood	4	6	3	3	3	5	4	8	2	2	2	2	3	4	**1**	3	246
4	(United Kingdom) Tom Oliphant	5	4	5	4	4	6	5	5	5	4	7	4	2	6	4	6	199
5	(United Kingdom) Stephen Jelley	6	3	8	6	2	2	3	4	Ret	DNS	4	8	4	2	9	8	180
6	(United Kingdom) Tom Sharp	3	5	7	5	23	8	8	3	3	5	3	3	16	5	6	7	174
7	(Lithuania) Jonas Gelžinis	7	8	4	8	6	7	2	7	7	9	9	10	8	9	7	4	150
8	(United Kingdom) Lewis Plato	8	5	6	7	7	4	8	6	4	7	5	7	Ret	10	Ret	9	133
9	(United Kingdom) Euan McKay	10	13	9	Ret	9	9	11	11	9	8	8	9	10	12	10	12	92
10	(Italy) Alessandro Latif	Ret	12	15	9	8	22	10	23	8	13	12	5	6	8	5	Ret	83
11	(United Kingdom) Daniel McKay	Ret	11	10	Ret	10	11	Ret	DNS	11	6	10	11	9	11	12	10	71
12	(Singapore) Sean Hudspeth	Ret	9	11	11	11	10	12	19	13	10	11	Ret	12	14	13	13	60
13	(United Kingdom) Justin Sherwood	11	7	12	Ret	13	13	13	11	Ret	12	13	12	11	13	14	14	54
14	(United Kingdom) Daniel Lloyd													7	7	2	5	48
15	(United Kingdom) John McCullagh	9	15	14	10	12	12	17	12	12	18	14	13	14	15	15	16	43
16	(United Kingdom) Bradley Ellis							6	9									17
17	(Lithuania) Tautvydas Barštys	12	18	13	Ret	18	14	15	15	17	14	17	15	17	19	18	21	14
18	(United Kingdom) Peter Kyle-Henney	13	19	22	19	16	19	14	14	14	15	15	17	13	Ret	19	20	14
19	(United Kingdom) Peter Jennings	14	14	16	13	14	17	23	16							16	15	13
20	(United Kingdom) Greg Caton									10	11							11
21	(United Kingdom) Mark Radcliffe	19	16	19	14	15	20	16	13	18	16	Ret	14	15	Ret	17	17	10
22	(United Kingdom) Iain Dockerill	15	17	23	15	20	16	20	18	15	17			20	17	20	Ret	4
23	(United Kingdom) Shamus Jennings	18	Ret	20	16	19	15	22	21	16	21	16	16	19	16	21	18	2
24	(United Kingdom) Peter Parsons	16	20	25	Ret	Ret	DNS	18	17	Ret	19					23	19	0
25	(United Kingdom) Barrie Baxter	17	Ret	17	18	21	Ret	19	20	19	23	18	19	18	18	22	22	0
26	(United Kingdom) Adrian Barwick			21	17	17	18			Ret	22							0
27	(United Kingdom) Rupert Martin	20	21	24	20	22	21	21	22	20	20	19	18	21	20			0
28	(Turkey) Salih Yoluc			Ret	21													0
29	(United Kingdom) Mark Cowne									21	24							0
Guest drivers ineligible for points
	(Republic of Ireland) Karl Leonard															11	11	0
	(United Kingdom) Graeme Mundy			18	12													0
Pos	Driver	BHI		SILGP		OUL		CRO		SNE		KNO		SILN		BHGP		Pts

Colour	Result
Gold	Winner
Silver	Second place
Bronze	Third place
Green	Points finish
Blue	Non-points finish
Blue	Non-classified finish (NC)
Purple	Retired (Ret)
Red	Did not qualify (DNQ)
Red	Did not pre-qualify (DNPQ)
Black	Disqualified (DSQ)
White	Did not start (DNS)
White	Withdrew (WD)
White	Race cancelled (C)
Blank	Did not practice (DNP)
Blank	Did not arrive (DNA)
Blank	Excluded (EX)

**Bold** – Pole
Italics – Fastest Lap

==== Pro-Am championships ====
Pos	Driver	BHI		SILGP		OUL		CRO		SNE		KNO		SILN		BHGP		Pts
Pro-Am 1
1	(United Kingdom) Euan McKay	10	13	9	Ret	**9**	**9**	**11**	**10**	**9**	**8**	**8**	**9**	**10**	12	10	12	161
2	(United Kingdom) Daniel McKay	Ret	**11**	10	Ret	10	11	Ret	DNS	11	6	10	11	9	**11**	**12**	**10**	117
3	(Singapore) Sean Hudspeth	**Ret**	9	11	11	11	10	12	19	13	10	11	Ret	12	14	13	13	113
4	(United Kingdom) John McCullagh	9	15	14	10	12	12	17	12	12	18	14	13	14	15	15	16	111
5	(United Kingdom) Justin Sherwood	11	7	**12**	**Ret**	13	13	13	11	Ret	12	13	12	11	13	14	14	105
6	(United Kingdom) Peter Jennings	18	14	16	13	14	17	23	16							16	15	60
7	(United Kingdom) Greg Caton									10	11							16
Pro-Am 2
1	(Lithuania) Tautvydas Barštys	12	18	**13**	**Ret**	18	14	**15**	**15**	**17**	**14**	17	15	17	19	**18**	**21**	138
2	(United Kingdom) Peter Kyle-Henney	13	19	22	19	**13**	20	14	14	14	15	15	17	**13**	**Ret**	19	20	130
3	(United Kingdom) Mark Radcliffe	19	16	19	14	15	**20**	16	13	18	16	**DSQ**	**14**	15	Ret	17	17	123
4	(United Kingdom) Shamus Jennings	18	Ret	20	16	19	15	22	21	16	21	16	16	19	16	21	18	102
5	(United Kingdom) Iain Dockerill	15	17	23	15	23	16	20	18	15	17			20	17	20	Ret	91
6	(United Kingdom) Barrie Baxter	17	Ret	17	18	21	Ret	19	20	19	23	18	19	18	18	22	22	80
7	(United Kingdom) Rupert Martin	20	21	20	24	22	21	21	22	20	20	19	18	21	20			60
8	(United Kingdom) Peter Parsons	16	20	25	Ret	Ret	DNS	18	17	Ret	19					23	19	47
9	(United Kingdom) Adrian Barwick			21	17	17	18			Ret	22							31
10	(Turkey) Salih Yoluc			Ret	21													4
11	(United Kingdom) Adrian Barwick									21	24							4
12	(United Kingdom) John McCullagh	**QO**	**QO**															2
Pos	Driver	BHI		SILGP		OUL		CRO		SNE		KNO		SILN		BHGP		Pts

Colour	Result
Gold	Winner
Silver	Second place
Bronze	Third place
Green	Points finish
Blue	Non-points finish
Blue	Non-classified finish (NC)
Purple	Retired (Ret)
Red	Did not qualify (DNQ)
Red	Did not pre-qualify (DNPQ)
Black	Disqualified (DSQ)
White	Did not start (DNS)
White	Withdrew (WD)
White	Race cancelled (C)
Blank	Did not practice (DNP)
Blank	Did not arrive (DNA)
Blank	Excluded (EX)

**Bold** – Pole
Italics – Fastest Lap
