= Dan Cammish =

British racing driver (born 1989)

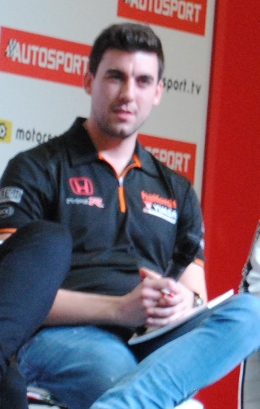
- Cammish at the 2020 Autosport International Show
- Nationality: (United Kingdom) British
- Born: Daniel Cammish; 10 April 1989 (age 37) Leeds, West Yorkshire, England

British Touring Car Championship career
- Debut season: 2018
- Current team: NAPA Racing UK
- Categorisation: FIA Silver (until 2016); FIA Gold (2017–)
- Car number: 27
- Former teams: Team Dynamics, BTC Racing
- Starts: 237
- Wins: 19
- Poles: 8
- Fastest laps: 13
- Best finish: 3rd in 2019-2020, 2025-2026

Previous series
- 2016 2015 2015-17 2014-17 2014 2009-2010, 2013 2012 2011 2011 2009: Blancpain GT Endurance; Porsche Carrera Cup Germany; Porsche Supercup; Porsche Carrera Cup GB; British GT; British Formula Ford; Eurocup Formula Renault 2.0; JK Racing Asia Series; Formula Renault UK; ADAC Formel Masters

Championship titles
- 2018 2015-16 2013 2009: Jack Sears Trophy; Porsche Carrera Cup GB; British Formula Ford; British Formula Ford: Scholarship Class

Daniel Cammish (born 10 April 1989) is a British racing driver currently competing in a Ford Focus for NAPA Racing UK in the British Touring Car Championship.

== Early life ==
Cammish was born in Leeds, West Yorkshire. He attended Morley High School.

== Racing career ==
Cammish made his karting debut in 2003, driving in the Manchester & Buxton Kart Club Junior Rotax Championship, in which he finished 20th. He raced in the Kartmasters British Grand Prix Super Libre, Super 1 National Formula A Championship and Super 1 National Rotax Max Championship before graduating to car racing in 2009, where he won the Formula Ford Scholarship class and competed in the ADAC Formel Masters. In 2012, he suffered a broken pelvis in a high-speed accident during a race in Spain.

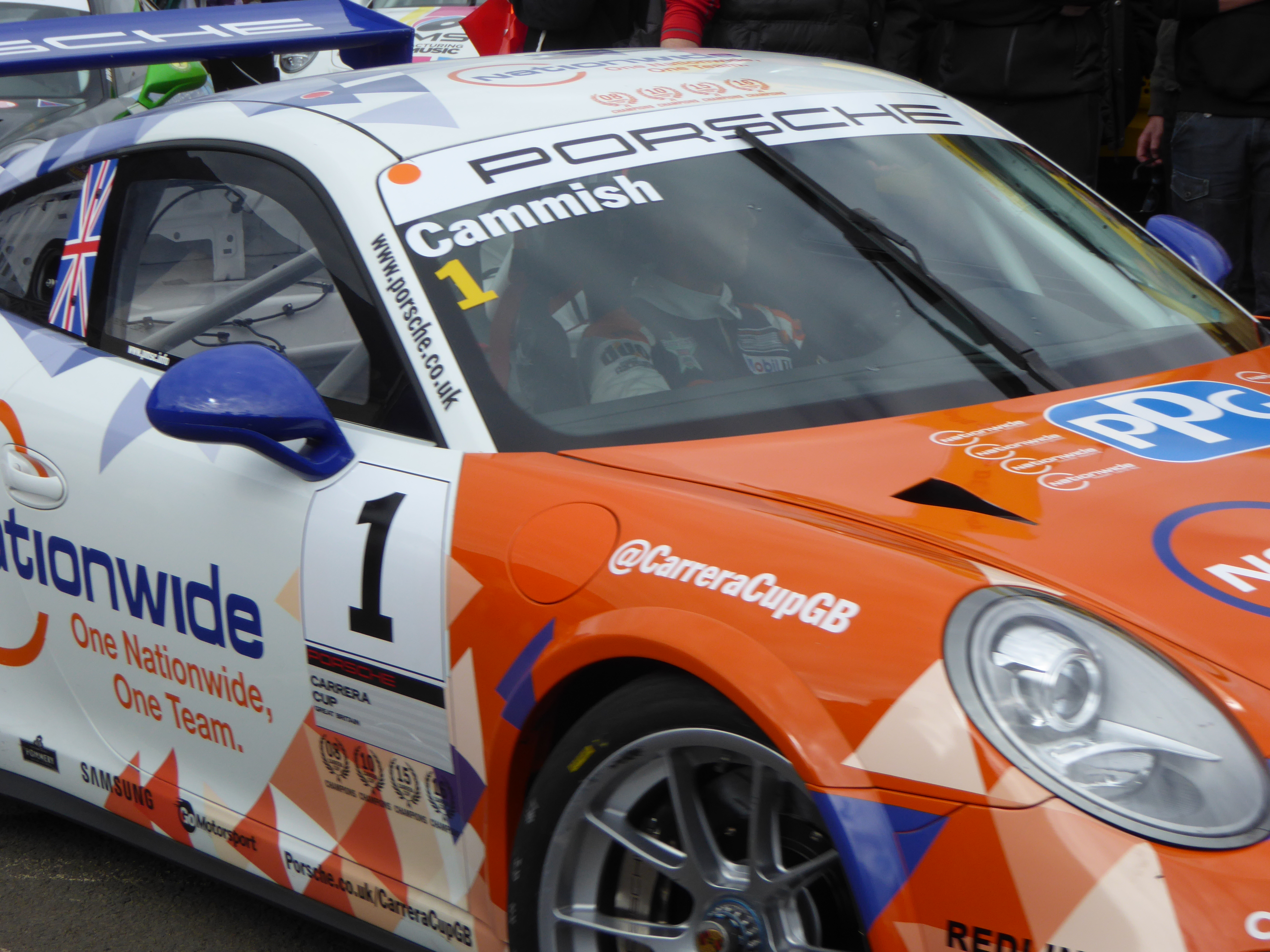
Cammish, at the Knockhill round of the 2017 Porsche Carrera Cup Great Britain.

Cammish won the 2013 British Formula Ford Championship, winning every race that he entered (24 wins in 24 races) as well as starting all but two of the races from the pole and setting 19 fastest laps. He set multiple records in the process of winning. His dominance of the Formula Ford Championship ensured that he would win the title in Rockingham by September, with two more race weekends to spare. Cammish thus skipped the final rounds of the season to celebrate winning the title. The championship runner-up and Cammish's nearest rival, Harrison Scott, won the third race at Silverstone, with the other remaining races going to international drivers Camren Kaminsky, Jayde Kruger and Juan Angel Rosso.

This won both Cammish and Scott a test for the BTCC Airwaves Ford team, with Cammish eyeing a full-time drive for the 2014 season. However, Cammish secured a drive with Team Parker Racing alongside Barrie Baxter in a Porsche 911 competing in the 2014 British GT Championship.

In 2015, Cammish raced in Porsche Supercup and Porsche Carrera Cup GB, winning the title in the latter. It was another dominant performance in which he finished inside the top two for every race that season, securing the title after winning 11 of the 16 rounds. He returned to the series in 2016. He won 12 races and became double champion. Cammish returned once again in 2017 but this time only finished third due to a fire costing him points in the penultimate round of the season.

For 2018, Cammish stepped up to the British Touring Car Championship with Honda and Team Dynamics. His debut year produced mixed results and he took his first win in the championship at the final round on the Brands Hatch GP circuit. He finished the year tenth with seven podiums. Cammish continued with the team in 2019 accumulating two wins and 14 podiums on his way to joint second in the championship. He had been leading the championship going into the final race but brake failure on the penultimate lap of the final race meant he lost out by just two points.

In 2021, Cammish returned to Porsche Carrera Cup GB sporting the iconic blue and yellow colours of Duckhams Oils.

== Racing record ==
=== Career summary ===
Season	Series	Team	Races	Wins	Poles	F/Laps	Podiums	Points	Position
2009	British Formula Ford Championship	Kevin Mills Racing	23	0	1	0	3	388	6th
2009	British Formula Ford Championship - Scholarship Class	Kevin Mills Racing	23	17	18	19	22	645	**1st**
2009	ADAC Formel Masters	Neuhauser Racing	6	0	0	1	0	22	13th
2010	British Formula Ford Championship	Kevin Mills Racing	6	0	0	0	2	486	**3rd**
2010	British Formula Ford Championship	JTR	19	2	0	2	5	486	**3rd**
2011	Formula Renault UK	Mark Burdett Motorsport	14	0	0	0	4	285	6th
2011	JK Racing Asia Series	Eurasia Motorsport	4	0	0	0	0	0	NC†
2012	Eurocup Formula Renault 2.0	Atech Reid GP	2	0	0	0	0	0	NC
2013	British Formula Ford Championship	JTR	24	24	22	19	24	739	**1st**
2014	British GT Championship - GT4	Team Parker Racing	10	0	0	2	0	83	8th
2014	Porsche Carrera Cup GB	Team Parker Racing	2	1	2	1	1	0	NC†
2015	Porsche Carrera Cup GB	Redline Racing	16	11	7	7	16	324	**1st**
2015	Porsche Supercup	Redline Racing	1	0	0	0	0	0	NC†
2015	Porsche Carrera Cup Germany	Konrad Motorsport	4	0	0	0	0	8	23rd
2016	Porsche Carrera Cup GB	Redline Racing	16	12	13	9	14	313	**1st**
2016	Porsche Supercup	Redline Racing	1	0	0	0	0	0	NC†
2016	Blancpain GT Series Endurance Cup	Konrad Motorsport	1	0	0	0	0	0	NC
2016	24H Series - 991	MSG Motorsport							
2017	Porsche Supercup	Lechner MSG Racing Team	11	0	0	3	3	122	4th
2017	Porsche Carrera Cup GB	Redline Racing	13	8	9	9	10	210	**3rd**
2018	British Touring Car Championship	Halfords Yuasa Racing	30	2	1	0	7	218	10th
2019	British Touring Car Championship	Halfords Yuasa Racing	30	2	0	3	14	318	**3rd**
2020	British Touring Car Championship	Halfords Yuasa Racing	27	4	2	3	10	334	**3rd**
2021	Porsche Carrera Cup GB	Duckhams Redline Racing	16	3	3	4	12	123	**1st**
2021	British Touring Car Championship	BTC Racing	3	0	0	0	1	30	21st
2022	British Touring Car Championship	NAPA Racing UK	30	1	1	0	4	207	8th
2023	British Touring Car Championship	NAPA Racing UK	27	3	2	1	6	253	6th
2024	British Touring Car Championship	NAPA Racing UK	30	1	0	3	9	346	5th
2025	British Touring Car Championship	NAPA Racing UK	30	3	2	2	10	307	**3rd**
2026	British Touring Car Championship	NAPA Racing UK	30	3	0	1	8	372	**3rd**

^{†} As Cammish was a guest driver, he was ineligible for championship points.

=== Complete British GT Championship results ===
(key) (Races in bold indicate pole position) (Races in italics indicate fastest lap)

Year	Team	Car	Class	1	2	3	4	5	6	7	8	9	10	DC	Points
2014	Team Parker Racing	Porsche 997 GT4	GT4	OUL; 1; 26	OUL; 2; 27	ROC; 1; 20	SIL; 1; 22	SNE; 1; 26	SNE; 2; 22	SPA; 1; 29	SPA; 2 Ret	BRH; 1; 21	DON; 1; 20	8th	83

=== Complete Porsche Carrera Cup Great Britain results ===
(key) (Races in bold indicate pole position) (Races in italics indicate fastest lap)

Year	Team	Class	1	2	3	4	5	6	7	8	9	10	11	12	13	14	15	16	17	18	19	DC	Points
2014	Team Parker Racing	Guest	BHI; 1	BHI; 2	DON; 1	DON; 2	THR; 1	THR; 2	SAR	CRO; 1	CRO; 2	SNE; 1	SNE; 2	KNO; 1	KNO; 2	ROC; 1	ROC; 2	SIL; 1	SIL; 2	**BHGP**; **1**; 1	**BHGP**; **2**; 5	NC‡	0‡
2015	Redline Racing		BHI; 1; 1	BHI; 2; 1	SPA; 1; 2	SPA; 2; 1	**OUL**; **1**; 1	OUL; 2; 2	**CRO**; **1**; 1	**CRO**; **2**; 1	**SNE**; **1**; 1	**SNE**; **2**; 1	KNO; 1; 1	**KNO**; **2**; 1	SIL; 1; 2	SIL; 2; 2	**BHGP**; **1**; 1	BHGP; 2; 2				1st	324
2016	Redline Racing		**BHI**; **1**; 2	**BHI**; **2**; 1	**SILGP**; **1**; 1	**SILGP**; **2**; 1	**OUL**; **1**; 1	**OUL**; **2**; 1	CRO; 1; 7	CRO; 2; 2	**SNE**; **1**; 1	**SNE**; **2**; 1	**KNO**; **1**; 1	**KNO**; **2**; 1	**SILN**; **1**; 1	**SILN**; **2**; 1	BHGP; 1; 8	**BHGP**; **2**; 1				1st	313
2017	Redline Racing		**BHI**; **1**; 1	**BHI**; **2**; 1	DON; 1; 2	DON; 2; 4	**OUL**; **1**; 1	**OUL**; **2**; 1	LMS; 1; 1	SNE; 1	SNE; 2	**KNO**; **1**; 1	KNO; 2 Ret	**SILN**; **1**; 2	**SILN**; **2** Ret	**BHGP**; **1**; 1	**BHGP**; **2**; 1					3rd	210
2021	Team Parker Racing		**BHI**; **1**; 10	BHI; 2; 3	SNE; 1; 1	SNE; 2; 2	OUL; 1; 2	OUL; 2; 5	KNO; 1; 4	KNO; 2; 3	**CRO**; **1**; 1	CRO; 2; 2	SIL; 1; 4	**SIL**; **2**; 1	DON; 1; 2	DON; 2; 3	BHGP; 1; 3	BHGP; 2; 3				1st	123

^{‡} As Cammish was a guest driver, he was ineligible to score points.

=== Complete Porsche Supercup results ===
(key) (Races in bold indicate pole position) (Races in italics indicate fastest lap)

Year	Team	1	2	3	4	5	6	7	8	9	10	11	DC	Points
2015	Redline Racing	CAT	MON	RBR	SIL; 9	HUN	SPA	MNZ	COA	COA			NC‡	0‡
2016	Redline Racing	CAT	MON	RBR	SIL; 9	HUN	HOC	SPA	MNZ	COA	COA		NC‡	0‡
2017	Lechner MSG Racing Team	CAT; 3	CAT; 4	MON; 2	RBR; 8	SIL; 4	HUN; 3	SPA; 4	SPA; Ret	MNZ; 9	MEX; 4	MEX; 29†	4th	122

^{‡} As Cammish was a guest driver, he was ineligible to score points.
^{†} Driver did not finish the race, but was classified as he completed over 75% of the race distance.

=== Complete British Touring Car Championship results ===
(key) (Races in bold indicate pole position – 1 point awarded just in first race; races in italics indicate fastest lap – 1 point awarded all races; * signifies that driver led race for at least one lap – 1 point given all races; ^{Superscript} number indicates points-scoring qualifying race position)

Year	Team	Car	1	2	3	4	5	6	7	8	9	10	11	12	13	14	15	16	17	18	19	20	21	22	23	24	25	26	27	28	29	30	DC	Points
2018	Halfords Yuasa Racing	Honda Civic Type R (FK8)	BRH; 1; 8	BRH; 2; 16	BRH; 3; 11	DON; 1; 2	DON; 2; 4*	DON; 3 Ret	THR; 1; 3	THR; 2; 26	THR; 3; 13	OUL; 1; 13	OUL; 2; 12	OUL; 3; 22	CRO; 1; 19	CRO; 2; 11	CRO; 3; 10	SNE; 1; 3	SNE; 2; 4	SNE; 3; 14	ROC; 1; 5	ROC; 2; 21	ROC; 3; 10	**KNO**; **1**; 3*	KNO; 2; 3	KNO; 3; 17	SIL; 1; 10	SIL; 2; 15	SIL; 3; 8	BRH; 1; 1*	**BRH**; **2**; 1*	BRH; 3; 17	10th	218
2019	Halfords Yuasa Racing	Honda Civic Type R (FK8)	BRH; 1; 16	BRH; 2; 12	BRH; 3; 14	DON; 1; 6	DON; 2; 13	DON; 3; 10	THR; 1; 3	THR; 2; 3	THR; 3; 6	CRO; 1; 6	CRO; 2; 3	CRO; 3; 10	OUL; 1; 2	OUL; 2; 3	OUL; 3; 17	SNE; 1; 2	SNE; 2; 2	SNE; 3; 15	THR; 1; 2	THR; 2; 5	THR; 3; 1*	KNO; 1; 3	KNO; 2; 2	KNO; 3; 6	SIL; 1; 11	SIL; 2; 3	SIL; 3; 12	BRH; 1; 1*	**BRH**; **2**; 3*	BRH; 3 Ret	3rd	318
2020	Halfords Yuasa Racing	Honda Civic Type R (FK8)	DON; 1; 1*	**DON**; **2**; 6	DON; 3; 7	BRH; 1; 1*	**BRH**; **2**; 19	BRH; 3 Ret	OUL; 1; 2	OUL; 2; 4	OUL; 3; 15	KNO; 1; 6	KNO; 2; 4	KNO; 3; 6	**THR**; **1**; 2	THR; 2; 2	THR; 3; 10	**SIL**; **1**; 1*	**SIL**; **2**; 2	SIL; 3; 4	CRO; 1; 10	CRO; 2; 5	CRO; 3; 2	SNE; 1; 6	SNE; 2; 6	SNE; 3; 6	BRH; 1; 1*	**BRH**; **2**; 3	BRH; 3; 4				3rd	334
2021	BTC Racing	Honda Civic Type R	THR; 1; 4	THR; 2; 2	THR; 3; 23	SNE; 1	SNE; 2	SNE; 3	BRH; 1	BRH; 2	BRH; 3	OUL; 1	OUL; 2	OUL; 3	KNO; 1	KNO; 2	KNO; 3	THR; 1	THR; 2	THR; 3	CRO; 1	CRO; 2	CRO; 3	SIL; 1	SIL; 2	SIL; 3	DON; 1	DON; 2	DON; 3	BRH; 1	BRH; 2	BRH; 3	21st	30
2022	NAPA Racing UK	Ford Focus ST	DON; 1; 16	DON; 2; 21	DON; 3; 13	BRH; 1; 3	BRH; 2; 2	BRH; 3; 10	THR; 1; 25	THR; 2; 18	THR; 3; 20	OUL; 1; 5	OUL; 2; 6	OUL; 3; 6	CRO; 1; 13	CRO; 2; 13	CRO; 3; 8	KNO; 1; 9	KNO; 2; 9	KNO; 3 Ret	SNE; 1; 7	SNE; 2; 18	SNE; 3; 16	**THR**; **1**; 1*	**THR**; **2**; 2*	THR; 3; 10	SIL; 1; 7	SIL; 2; 7	SIL; 3; 5	BRH; 1; 9	BRH; 2; 8	BRH; 3; 8	8th	207
2023	NAPA Racing UK	Ford Focus ST	DON; 1; 1*	**DON**; **2**; 12*	**DON**; **3**; 1*	**BRH**; **1**; 3	BRH; 2; 5	BRH; 3; 4	SNE; 1; 11	SNE; 2; 11	SNE; 3 DSQ	THR; 1; 5	THR; 2; 5	THR; 3; 8	OUL; 1; 5	OUL; 2; 6	OUL; 3; 5	**CRO**; **1**; 1*	**CRO**; **2**; 2	CRO; 3; 4	KNO; 1; 14	KNO; 2 Ret	KNO; 3; 10	DON; 1 WD	DON; 2 WD	DON; 3 WD	SIL; 1 Ret	SIL; 2; 24	SIL; 3; 23	BRH; 1; 5	BRH; 2; 3	BRH; 3; 9	6th	253
2024	NAPA Racing UK	Ford Focus ST	DON; 1; 8	DON; 2; 6	DON; 3; 10	BRH; 1; 18	BRH; 2; 7	BRH; 3; 5	SNE; 1; 4	SNE; 2; 2	SNE; 3; 13	THR; 1; 2	THR; 2; 2	THR; 3; 2	OUL; 1; 3	OUL; 2; 4	OUL; 3; 5	CRO; 1; 3	CRO; 2; 6	CRO; 3; 2	KNO; 1; 9	KNO; 2; 7	KNO; 3; 8	DON; 1; 8	DON; 2; 11	**DON**; **3**; 1*	SIL; 1; 3	SIL; 2; 5	SIL; 3; 4	BRH; 1; 5	BRH; 2; 4	BRH; 3; 4	5th	346
2025	NAPA Racing UK	Ford Focus ST	**DON**; **1**; 8	DON; 2; 3	DON; 3; 4	BRH; 1; 5	BRH; 2 Ret	BRH; 3; 14	**SNE**; **1**; 1*	**SNE**; **2**; 19	SNE; 3; 6	THR; 1; 2	THR; 2; 4	THR; 3; 3	OUL; 1; 2	OUL; 2; 10	OUL; 3; 6	CRO; 1; 2	CRO; 2; 10	CRO; 3 Ret	KNO; 1; 5	KNO; 2; 3	KNO; 3; 2	DON; 1; 5	DON; 2; 1*	DON; 3; 12	SIL; 1; 12	SIL; 2 Ret	SIL; 3; 9	BRH; 1; 1*	**BRH**; **2**; 5	BRH; 3 Ret	3rd	307
2026	NAPA Racing UK	Ford Focus Titanium Saloon	DON; 1; 4^{13}	DON; 2; 2	DON; 3; 10	BRH; 1; 4^{3}	BRH; 2; 14	BRH; 3; 16	SNE; 1; 5^{4}	SNE; 2; 4	SNE; 3; 9	**OUL**; **1**; 1*^{1}	**OUL**; **2**; 3*	OUL; 3; 4	THR; 1; 7^{4}	THR; 2; 2	THR; 3; 3	KNO; 1; 18^{10}	KNO; 2; 9	KNO; 3; 3	DON; 1; 4^{5}	DON; 2; 1*	DON; 3; 15	CRO; 1; 4^{2}	CRO; 2; 4	CRO; 3; 18	SIL; 1; 21^{15}	SIL; 2; 6	SIL; 3; 5	BRH; 1; 8^{10}	BRH; 2; 6	BRH; 3; 1	3rd	372

Sporting positions
Preceded by Chrissy Palmer	British Formula Ford Scholarship; Champion; 2009	Succeeded by Tristan Mingay
Preceded by Antti Buri	British Formula Ford Championship; Champion; 2013	Succeeded by Jayde Kruger
Preceded by Josh Webster	Porsche Carrera Cup GB; Champion; 2015-2016	Succeeded by Charlie Eastwood
Preceded by Senna Proctor	Jack Sears Trophy; Winner; 2018	Succeeded by Rory Butcher
Preceded by Harry King	Porsche Carrera Cup GB; Champion; 2021	Succeeded by Kiern Jewiss
Awards and achievements
Preceded by Scott Malvern	Autosport Awards; British Club Driver of the Year; 2013	Succeeded by Ben Barnicoat
