= 2014 Blancpain Sprint Series =

International sports car racing series

Seasons
- ← 2013 2015 →

The 2014 Blancpain Sprint Series was the second season following on from the demise of the SRO Group's FIA GT1 World Championship (an auto racing series for grand tourer cars), the first with the designation of Blancpain Sprint Series.

== Calendar ==
The series began at the Circuit Paul Armagnac in Nogaro, France on 21 April and ended at Baku World Challenge in Azerbaijan on 2 November. The seven-event calendar contained largely the same events as FIA GT Series, with the addition of races at Brands Hatch in the Great Britain and Algarve in Portugal, and the pullout of Circuito de Navarra, Spain.

Event	Circuit	Date	Report
1	Circuit Paul Armagnac, Nogaro, France	21 April	report
2	(United Kingdom) Brands Hatch, Kent, Great Britain	18 May	report
3	Circuit Park Zandvoort, North Holland, Netherlands	6 July	report
4	Automotodróm Slovakia Ring, Orechová Potôň, Slovakia	24 August	report
5	Algarve International Circuit, Algarve, Portugal	7 September	report
6	Circuit Zolder, Heusden-Zolder, Belgium	19 October	report
7	Baku World Challenge, Baku, Azerbaijan	2 November	report

== Entry list ==
Team	Car	No.	Drivers	Class	Rounds
(Brazil) BMW Sports Trophy Team Brasil	BMW Z4 GT3	0	(Brazil) Cacá Bueno	P	1–6
(Brazil) BMW Sports Trophy Team Brasil	BMW Z4 GT3	0	(Brazil) Sérgio Jimenez	P	1–6
(Brazil) BMW Sports Trophy Team Brasil	BMW Z4 GT3	20	(Brazil) Ricardo Sperafico	P	7
(Brazil) BMW Sports Trophy Team Brasil	BMW Z4 GT3	20	(Brazil) Rodrigo Sperafico	P	7
(Brazil) BMW Sports Trophy Team Brasil	BMW Z4 GT3	21	(Brazil) Nelson Piquet Jr.	P	1
(Brazil) BMW Sports Trophy Team Brasil	BMW Z4 GT3	21	(Brazil) Matheus Stumpf	P	1
(Brazil) BMW Sports Trophy Team Brasil	BMW Z4 GT3	30	(Brazil) Matheus Stumpf	P	2–7
(Brazil) BMW Sports Trophy Team Brasil	BMW Z4 GT3	30	(Brazil) Valdeno Brito	P	2, 4
(Brazil) BMW Sports Trophy Team Brasil	BMW Z4 GT3	30	(Brazil) Nelson Piquet Jr.	P	3, 5–6
(Brazil) BMW Sports Trophy Team Brasil	BMW Z4 GT3	30	(Brazil) Miguel Paludo	P	7
(Belgium) Belgian Audi Club Team WRT	Audi R8 LMS ultra	1	(Belgium) Laurens Vanthoor	P	All
(Belgium) Belgian Audi Club Team WRT	Audi R8 LMS ultra	1	(Brazil) César Ramos	P	All
(Belgium) Belgian Audi Club Team WRT	Audi R8 LMS ultra	2	(Germany) René Rast	P	All
(Belgium) Belgian Audi Club Team WRT	Audi R8 LMS ultra	2	(Belgium) Enzo Ide	P	All
(Belgium) Belgian Audi Club Team WRT	Audi R8 LMS ultra	4	(Poland) Mateusz Lisowski	S	All
(Belgium) Belgian Audi Club Team WRT	Audi R8 LMS ultra	4	(France) Vincent Abril	S	All
(Belgium) Belgian Audi Club Team WRT	Audi R8 LMS ultra	9	(Monaco) Stéphane Ortelli	P	4–7
(Belgium) Belgian Audi Club Team WRT	Audi R8 LMS ultra	9	(Germany) Fabian Hamprecht	P	4–5
(Belgium) Belgian Audi Club Team WRT	Audi R8 LMS ultra	9	(Monaco) Stéphane Richelmi	P	6–7
(Russia) G-Drive Racing (Note: At the first three rounds, G-Drive Racing ran as a support team for the W Racing Team. At the fifth round, G-Drive Racing formed part of the Reiter Engineering entry.)	Audi R8 LMS ultra	3	(Monaco) Stéphane Ortelli	P	1–3
(Russia) G-Drive Racing	Audi R8 LMS ultra	3	(France) Grégory Guilvert	P	1
(Russia) G-Drive Racing	Audi R8 LMS ultra	3	(Russia) Roman Rusinov	P	2–3
(Russia) G-Drive Racing	Lamborghini Gallardo FL2	3	(Russia) Roman Rusinov	P	5–6
(Russia) G-Drive Racing	Lamborghini Gallardo FL2	3	(Czech Republic) Tomáš Enge	P	5–6
(Germany) Phoenix Racing	Audi R8 LMS ultra	5	(United Kingdom) Alessandro Latif	P	1
(Germany) Phoenix Racing	Audi R8 LMS ultra	5	(Germany) Marc Basseng	P	1
(Germany) Phoenix Racing	Audi R8 LMS ultra	5	(United Kingdom) Alessandro Latif	PA	2–7
(Germany) Phoenix Racing	Audi R8 LMS ultra	5	(Germany) Marc Basseng	PA	2–7
(Germany) Phoenix Racing	Audi R8 LMS ultra	6	(Germany) Markus Winkelhock	P	All
(Germany) Phoenix Racing	Audi R8 LMS ultra	6	(Austria) Nikolaus Mayr-Melnhof	P	All
(Germany) Zakspeed	Mercedes-Benz SLS AMG GT3	13	(Israel) Alon Day	P	7
(Germany) Zakspeed	Mercedes-Benz SLS AMG GT3	13	(Sweden) Andreas Simonsen	P	7
(Belgium) Boutsen Ginion	McLaren MP4-12C GT3	15	(France) Kévin Estre	P	7
(Belgium) Boutsen Ginion	McLaren MP4-12C GT3	15	(United Kingdom) Robert Bell	P	7
(Belgium) Boutsen Ginion	McLaren MP4-12C GT3	16	(New Zealand) Chris van der Drift	P	7
(Belgium) Boutsen Ginion	McLaren MP4-12C GT3	16	(Belgium) Frédéric Vervisch	P	7
(Germany) Tonino Team Herberth	Porsche 997 GT3-R	21	(Netherlands) Jaap van Lagen	P	3
(Germany) Tonino Team Herberth	Porsche 997 GT3-R	21	(Germany) Robert Renauer	P	3
(Switzerland) Blancpain Racing	Lamborghini Gallardo FL2	24	(Switzerland) Marc A. Hayek	PA	1
(Switzerland) Blancpain Racing	Lamborghini Gallardo FL2	24	(Netherlands) Peter Kox	PA	1
(Austria) Grasser Racing Team	Lamborghini Gallardo FL2	27	(Czech Republic) Tomáš Enge	P	1
(Austria) Grasser Racing Team	Lamborghini Gallardo FL2	27	(Austria) Sascha Halek	P	1
(Austria) Grasser Racing Team	Lamborghini Gallardo FL2	27	(Austria) Sascha Halek	PA	2–5
(Austria) Grasser Racing Team	Lamborghini Gallardo FL2	27	(Austria) Stefan Landmann	PA	2–5
(Austria) Grasser Racing Team	Lamborghini Gallardo FL2	27	(Austria) Stefan Landmann	P	6–7
(Austria) Grasser Racing Team	Lamborghini Gallardo FL2	27	(Czech Republic) Tomas Pivoda	P	6–7
(Austria) Grasser Racing Team	Lamborghini Gallardo FL2	28	(Austria) Hari Proczyk	P	All
(Austria) Grasser Racing Team	Lamborghini Gallardo FL2	28	(Netherlands) Jeroen Bleekemolen	P	All
(United Kingdom) Trackspeed	Porsche 997 GT3-R	31	(United Kingdom) Richard Westbrook	P	7
(United Kingdom) Trackspeed	Porsche 997 GT3-R	31	(Austria) Norbert Siedler	P	7
(Italy) ROAL Motorsport	BMW Z4 GT3	33	(Italy) Alex Zanardi	P	1–2, 4–7
(Italy) ROAL Motorsport	BMW Z4 GT3	34	(Italy) Stefano Colombo	S	All
(Italy) ROAL Motorsport	BMW Z4 GT3	34	(Italy) David Fumanelli	S	All
(Germany) Schütz Motorsport	Porsche 997 GT3 R	36	(Germany) Marco Holzer	P	7
(Germany) Schütz Motorsport	Porsche 997 GT3 R	36	(Austria) Martin Ragginger	P	7
(Italy) Bhaitech	McLaren MP4-12C GT3	60	(Italy) Fabio Onidi	P	All
(Italy) Bhaitech	McLaren MP4-12C GT3	60	(Italy) Giorgio Pantano	P	All
(Italy) Bhaitech	McLaren MP4-12C GT3	61	(Estonia) Sten Pentus	P	1–6
(Italy) Bhaitech	McLaren MP4-12C GT3	61	(United Kingdom) Daniel Lloyd	P	1–3
(Italy) Bhaitech	McLaren MP4-12C GT3	61	(New Zealand) Chris van der Drift	P	4–6
(Italy) Bhaitech	McLaren MP4-12C GT3	61	(Czech Republic) Filip Salaquarda	P	7
(Italy) Bhaitech	McLaren MP4-12C GT3	61	(Portugal) Álvaro Parente	P	7
(United Kingdom) Fortec Motorsport	Mercedes-Benz SLS AMG GT3	62	(India) Armaan Ebrahim	S	1
(United Kingdom) Fortec Motorsport	Mercedes-Benz SLS AMG GT3	62	(United Kingdom) Benjamin Hetherington	S	1
(United Kingdom) Fortec Motorsport	Mercedes-Benz SLS AMG GT3	63	(United Kingdom) Benjamin Hetherington	S	6–7
(United Kingdom) Fortec Motorsport	Mercedes-Benz SLS AMG GT3	63	(Spain) Miguel Toril	S	All
(United Kingdom) Fortec Motorsport	Mercedes-Benz SLS AMG GT3	63	(Germany) Nico Bastian	S	1
(United Kingdom) Fortec Motorsport	Mercedes-Benz SLS AMG GT3	63	(India) Armaan Ebrahim	S	2–5
(Portugal) Sports and You	Mercedes-Benz SLS AMG GT3	71	(Portugal) Paulo Pinheiro	PA	5
(Portugal) Sports and You	Mercedes-Benz SLS AMG GT3	71	(Portugal) Francisco Mora	PA	5
(Portugal) Sports and You	Mercedes-Benz SLS AMG GT3	72	(Portugal) António Coimbra	PA	5
(Portugal) Sports and You	Mercedes-Benz SLS AMG GT3	72	(Portugal) Luis Silva	PA	5
(Germany) Vita4one Racing Team	BMW Z4 GT3	72	(Germany) Michael Bartels	P	6
(Germany) Vita4one Racing Team	BMW Z4 GT3	72	(Netherlands) Yelmer Buurman	P	6
(Germany) BMW Sports Trophy Team Schubert	BMW Z4 GT3	76	(Austria) Dominik Baumann	P	3–7
(Germany) BMW Sports Trophy Team Schubert	BMW Z4 GT3	76	(Austria) Thomas Jäger	P	3–6
(Germany) BMW Sports Trophy Team Schubert	BMW Z4 GT3	76	(Germany) Jens Klingmann	P	7
(Germany) HTP Motorsport	Mercedes-Benz SLS AMG GT3	84	(Germany) Maximilian Götz	P	All
(Germany) HTP Motorsport	Mercedes-Benz SLS AMG GT3	84	(Germany) Maximilian Buhk	P	1–3, 5–7
(Germany) HTP Motorsport	Mercedes-Benz SLS AMG GT3	84	(Belgium) Nico Verdonck	P	4
(Germany) HTP Motorsport	Mercedes-Benz SLS AMG GT3	85	(Netherlands) Stef Dusseldorp	P	All
(Germany) HTP Motorsport	Mercedes-Benz SLS AMG GT3	85	(Russia) Sergey Afanasyev	P	All
(Germany) HTP Motorsport	Mercedes-Benz SLS AMG GT3	86	(Germany) Lucas Wolf	S	4–7
(Germany) HTP Motorsport	Mercedes-Benz SLS AMG GT3	86	(Germany) Luca Stolz	S	4–7
(Germany) Reiter Engineering	Lamborghini Gallardo FL2	88	(Slovakia) Štefan Rosina	P	2–4
(Germany) Reiter Engineering	Lamborghini Gallardo FL2	88	(Czech Republic) Tomáš Enge	P	2, 4
(Germany) Reiter Engineering	Lamborghini Gallardo FL2	88	(Netherlands) Peter Kox	P	3
(Germany) Farnbacher Racing	Porsche 997 GT3-R	89	(Switzerland) Philipp Frommenwiler	P	2
(Germany) Farnbacher Racing	Porsche 997 GT3-R	89	(United Kingdom) Nick Tandy	P	2
(Italy) Scuderia Villorba Corse	Ferrari 458 Italia GT3	90	(Italy) Andrea Montermini	P	1–2, 4
(Italy) Scuderia Villorba Corse	Ferrari 458 Italia GT3	90	(Czech Republic) Filip Salaquarda	P	1–4, 6
(Italy) Scuderia Villorba Corse	Ferrari 458 Italia GT3	90	(Italy) Alessandro Balzan	P	3, 6
(Belgium) NSC Motorsports	Lamborghini Gallardo FL2	95	(Netherlands) Nick Catsburg	P	6
(Belgium) NSC Motorsports	Lamborghini Gallardo FL2	95	(Netherlands) Peter Kox	P	6
(Germany) All–Inkl.com Münnich Motorsport	Mercedes-Benz SLS AMG GT3	97	(Germany) René Münnich	PA	4
(United Kingdom) Beechdean AMR	Aston Martin V12 Vantage GT3	107	(United Kingdom) Jonathan Adam	P	6–7
(United Kingdom) Beechdean AMR	Aston Martin V12 Vantage GT3	107	(Spain) Andy Soucek	P	6–7
(Germany) Callaway – RWT	Corvette Z06.R GT3	112	(Germany) Sven Barth	S	7
(Germany) Callaway – RWT	Corvette Z06.R GT3	112	(Germany) David Jahn	S	7
(Germany) Callaway – RWT	Corvette Z06.R GT3	110	(Germany) Daniel Keilwitz	P	7
(Germany) Callaway – RWT	Corvette Z06.R GT3	110	(Germany) Andreas Wirth	P	7
(Russia) GT Russian Team	Mercedes-Benz SLS AMG GT3	177	(Russia) Aleksey Vasilyev	PA	6–7
(Russia) GT Russian Team	Mercedes-Benz SLS AMG GT3	177	(Estonia) Marko Asmer	PA	6–7
(Germany) Prosperia ABT Racing	Audi R8 LMS ultra	777	(Germany) Christopher Mies	P	7
(Germany) Prosperia ABT Racing	Audi R8 LMS ultra	777	(South Africa) Kelvin van der Linde	P	7
(United Kingdom) Triple 888 Racing	BMW Z4 GT3	888	(United Kingdom) Ryan Ratcliffe	S	7
(United Kingdom) Triple 888 Racing	BMW Z4 GT3	888	(United Kingdom) Joe Osborne	S	7

Icon	Class
P	Pro
S	Silver Cup
PA	Pro-Am Trophy

== Race results ==
Event	Circuit	Pole position	Qualifying Race Winner	Championship Race Winner	Report
1	(France) Nogaro	(Austria) No. 28 Grasser Racing Team	(Belgium) No. 1 Belgian Audi Club Team WRT	(Germany) No. 84 HTP Motorsport	Report
1	(France) Nogaro	(Austria) Hari Proczyk (Netherlands) Jeroen Bleekemolen	(Belgium) Laurens Vanthoor (Brazil) César Ramos	(Germany) Maximilian Buhk (Germany) Maximilian Götz	Report
2	(United Kingdom) Brands Hatch	(Belgium) No. 1 Belgian Audi Club Team WRT	(Austria) No. 28 Grasser Racing Team	(Austria) No. 28 Grasser Racing Team	Report
2	(United Kingdom) Brands Hatch	(Belgium) Laurens Vanthoor (Brazil) César Ramos	(Austria) Hari Proczyk (Netherlands) Jeroen Bleekemolen	(Austria) Hari Proczyk (Netherlands) Jeroen Bleekemolen	Report
3	(Netherlands) Zandvoort	(Austria) No. 28 Grasser Racing Team	(Austria) No. 28 Grasser Racing Team	(Belgium) No. 2 Belgian Audi Club Team WRT	Report
3	(Netherlands) Zandvoort	(Austria) Hari Proczyk (Netherlands) Jeroen Bleekemolen	(Austria) Hari Proczyk (Netherlands) Jeroen Bleekemolen	(Germany) René Rast (Belgium) Enzo Ide	Report
4	Slovakia Ring	(Belgium) No. 1 Belgian Audi Club Team WRT	(Belgium) No. 1 Belgian Audi Club Team WRT	(Germany) No.76 BMW Sports Trophy Team Schubert	Report
4	Slovakia Ring	(Belgium) Laurens Vanthoor (Brazil) César Ramos	(Belgium) Laurens Vanthoor (Brazil) César Ramos	(Austria) Dominik Baumann (Austria) Thomas Jäger	Report
5	(Portugal) Algarve	(Russia) No. 3 G-Drive Racing	(Austria) No. 28 Grasser Racing Team	(Germany) No. 84 HTP Motorsport	Report
5	(Portugal) Algarve	(Russia) Roman Rusinov (Czech Republic) Tomáš Enge	(Austria) Hari Proczyk (Netherlands) Jeroen Bleekemolen	(Germany) Maximilian Buhk (Germany) Maximilian Götz	Report
6	(Belgium) Zolder	(Belgium) No. 1 Belgian Audi Club Team WRT	(Belgium) No. 1 Belgian Audi Club Team WRT	(Germany) No. 84 HTP Motorsport	Report
6	(Belgium) Zolder	(Belgium) Laurens Vanthoor (Brazil) César Ramos	(Belgium) Laurens Vanthoor (Brazil) César Ramos	(Germany) Maximilian Buhk (Germany) Maximilian Götz	Report
7	(Azerbaijan) Baku	(Belgium) No. 9 Belgian Audi Club Team WRT	(Belgium) No. 1 Belgian Audi Club Team WRT	(Belgium) No. 1 Belgian Audi Club Team WRT	Report
7	(Azerbaijan) Baku	(Monaco) Stéphane Ortelli (Monaco) Stéphane Richelmi	(Belgium) Laurens Vanthoor (Brazil) César Ramos	(Belgium) Laurens Vanthoor (Brazil) César Ramos	Report

== Championship standings ==
Scoring system

Championship points were awarded for the first six positions in each Qualifying Race and for the first ten positions in each Championship Race. The pole-sitter in the qualifying race also received one point, entries were required to complete 75% of the winning car's race distance in order to be classified and earn points. Individual drivers were required to participate for a minimum of 25 minutes in order to earn championship points in any race.

Qualifying race points

Position	**1st**	**2nd**	**3rd**	**4th**	**5th**	**6th**	**Pole**
Points	8	6	4	3	2	1	1

Championship race points

Position	**1st**	**2nd**	**3rd**	**4th**	**5th**	**6th**	**7th**	**8th**	**9th**	**10th**
Points	25	18	15	12	10	8	6	4	2	1

=== Drivers' Championship ===
==== Cup ====
Pos.	Driver	Team	NOG (France)		BRH (United Kingdom)		ZAN (Netherlands)		SVK (Slovakia)		ALG (Portugal)		ZOL (Belgium)		BAK (Azerbaijan)		Total
Pos.	Driver	Team	QR	CR	QR	CR	QR	CR	QR	CR	QR	CR	QR	CR	QR	CR	Total
1	(Germany) Maximilian Götz	(Germany) HTP Motorsport	5	1	2	2	2	4	3	4	2	1	6	1	9	Ret	142
2	(Germany) Maximilian Buhk	(Germany) HTP Motorsport	5	1	2	2	2	4			2	1	6	1	9	Ret	126
3	(Austria) Hari Proczyk (Netherlands) Jeroen Bleekemolen	(Austria) Grasser Racing Team	**17**	6	1	1	**1**	5	2	Ret	1	2	3	2	15	Ret	115
4	(Brazil) César Ramos (Belgium) Laurens Vanthoor	(Belgium) Belgian Audi Club Team WRT	1	Ret	**6**	4	3	10	**1**	11	4	8	**1**	3	1	1	100
5	(Belgium) Enzo Ide (Germany) René Rast	(Belgium) Belgian Audi Club Team WRT	DSQ	7	14	9	4	1	9	3	3	5	4	Ret	4	Ret	71
6	(Brazil) Cacá Bueno (Brazil) Sérgio Jimenez	(Brazil) BMW Sports Trophy Team Brasil	3	5	3	3	Ret	14	7	2	9	14	21	8			55
7	(Monaco) Stéphane Ortelli	(Russia) G-Drive Racing	4	2	Ret	13	9	Ret									54
7	(Monaco) Stéphane Ortelli	(Belgium) Belgian Audi Club Team WRT							12	Ret	17	3	23	10	**3**	4	54
8	(Austria) Dominik Baumann	(Germany) BMW Sports Trophy Team Schubert					5	2	Ret	1	13	13	8	Ret	Ret	Ret	45
8	(Austria) Thomas Jäger	(Germany) BMW Sports Trophy Team Schubert					5	2	Ret	1	13	13	8	Ret			45
9	(United Kingdom) Jonathan Adam (Spain) Andy Soucek	(United Kingdom) Beechdean AMR											5	5	2	2	36
10	(Russia) Sergey Afanasyev (Netherlands) Stef Dusseldorp	(Germany) HTP Motorsport	6	4	Ret	Ret	Ret	DNS	Ret	6	5	11	11	4	Ret	Ret	35
11	(Austria) Nikolaus Mayr-Melnhof (Germany) Markus Winkelhock	(Germany) Phoenix Racing	2	Ret	5	Ret	Ret	11	15	Ret	Ret	6	16	18	6	3	32
12	(France) Vincent Abril (Poland) Mateusz Lisowski	(Belgium) Belgian Audi Club Team WRT	7	3	12	6	11	9	6	9	7	Ret	17	11	Ret	17	28
13	(France) Grégory Guilvert	(Russia) G-Drive Racing	4	2													21
14	(Italy) Fabio Onidi (Italy) Giorgio Pantano	(Italy) Bhaitech	11	8	8	16	13	Ret	Ret	Ret	Ret	10	7	6	12	7	19
15	(Monaco) Stéphane Richelmi	(Belgium) Belgian Audi Club Team WRT											23	10	**3**	4	18
16	(Belgium) Nico Verdonck	(Germany) HTP Motorsport							3	4							16
16	(Germany) Robert Renauer (Netherlands) Jaap van Lagen	(Germany) Tonino Team Herberth					6	3									16
16	(Czech Republic) Tomáš Enge	(Austria) Grasser Racing Team	9	16													16
16	(Czech Republic) Tomáš Enge	(Germany) Reiter Engineering			9	Ret			Ret	DNS							16
16	(Czech Republic) Tomáš Enge	(Russia) G-Drive Racing									**6**	4	13	9			16
16	(Russia) Roman Rusinov	(Russia) G-Drive Racing			Ret	13	9	Ret			**6**	4	13	9			16
17	(Germany) Fabian Hamprecht	(Belgium) Belgian Audi Club Team WRT							12	Ret	17	3					15
18	(Brazil) Matheus Stumpf	(Brazil) BMW Sports Trophy Team Brasil	18	15	4	8	12	8	4	Ret	10	16	22	Ret	Ret	Ret	14
18	(Germany) Marc Basseng (United Kingdom) Alessandro Latif	(Germany) Phoenix Racing	10	9	13	11	10	13	8	7	11	7	15	15	DNS	DNS	14
19	(Czech Republic) Filip Salaquarda	(Italy) Scuderia Villorba Corse	8	10	7	7	17	DNS	Ret	DNS			9	7			13
19	(Czech Republic) Filip Salaquarda	(Italy) Bhaitech													20	16	13
20	(Netherlands) Peter Kox	(Switzerland) Blancpain Racing	12	Ret													12
20	(Netherlands) Peter Kox	(Germany) Reiter Engineering					16	7									12
20	(Netherlands) Peter Kox	(Belgium) NSC Motorsports											2	Ret			12
20	(Austria) Martin Ragginger (Germany) Marco Holzer	(Germany) Schütz Motorsport													5	5	12
20	(Italy) Alex Zanardi	(Italy) ROAL Motorsport	14	13	17	5			10	Ret	14	9	10	13	Ret	DNS	12
20	(New Zealand) Chris van der Drift	(Italy) Bhaitech							13	8	12	12	Ret	Ret			12
20	(New Zealand) Chris van der Drift	(Belgium) Boutsen Ginion													7	6	12
21	(Brazil) Valdeno Brito	(Brazil) BMW Sports Trophy Team Brasil			4	8			4	Ret							10
21	(Germany) Lucas Wolf (Germany) Luca Stolz	(Germany) HTP Motorsport							17	5	8	17	19	12	19	DNS	10
22	(Belgium) Frédéric Vervisch	(Belgium) Boutsen Ginion													7	6	8
22	(Austria) Sascha Halek	(Austria) Grasser Racing Team	9	16	15	15	8	6	16	12	16	19					8
22	(Austria) Stefan Landmann	(Austria) Grasser Racing Team			15	15	8	6	16	12	16	19	14	DNS	DNS	DNS	8
23	(Italy) Andrea Montermini	(Italy) Scuderia Villorba Corse	8	10	7	7			Ret	DNS							7
24	(Netherlands) Nick Catsburg	(Belgium) NSC Motorsports											2	Ret			6
24	(Slovakia) Štefan Rosina	(Germany) Reiter Engineering			9	Ret	16	7	Ret	DNS							6
24	(Italy) Alessandro Balzan	(Italy) Scuderia Villorba Corse					17	DNS					9	7			6
25	(Estonia) Sten Pentus	(Italy) Bhaitech	16	14	10	12	7	15	13	8	12	12	Ret	Ret			4
25	(Brazil) Nelson Piquet Jr.	(Brazil) BMW Sports Trophy Team Brasil	18	15			12	8			10	16	22	Ret			4
25	(Germany) Sven Barth (Germany) David Jahn	(Germany) Callaway – RWT													14	8	4
26	(Italy) Stefano Colombo (Italy) David Fumanelli	(Italy) ROAL Motorsport	15	11	11	10	15	12	5	13	Ret	15	12	17	Ret	14	3
27	(Brazil) Ricardo Sperafico (Brazil) Rodrigo Sperafico	(Brazil) BMW Sports Trophy Team Brasil													10	9	2
28	(Spain) Miguel Toril	(United Kingdom) Fortec Motorsport	13	12	16	14	14	16	11	10	15	Ret	Ret	14	16	11	1
28	(India) Armaan Ebrahim	(United Kingdom) Fortec Motorsport	DNS	DNS	16	14	14	16	11	10	15	Ret					1
28	(Israel) Alon Day (Sweden) Andreas Simonsen	(Germany) Zakspeed													13	10	1
	(United Kingdom) Daniel Lloyd	(Italy) Bhaitech	16	14	10	12	7	15									0
	(Germany) Daniel Keilwitz (Germany) Andreas Wirth	(Germany) Callaway – RWT													8	Ret	0
	(United Kingdom) Benjamin Hetherington	(United Kingdom) Fortec Motorsport	DNS	DNS									Ret	14	16	11	0
	(Austria) Norbert Siedler (United Kingdom) Richard Westbrook	(United Kingdom) Trackspeed													11	Ret	0
	(Germany) Nico Bastian	(United Kingdom) Fortec Motorsport	13	12													0
	(Estonia) Marko Asmer (Russia) Aleksey Vasilyev	(Russia) GT Russian Team											20	Ret	18	12	0
	(Switzerland) Marc A. Hayek	(Switzerland) Blancpain Racing	12	Ret													0
	(United Kingdom) Joe Osborne (United Kingdom) Ryan Ratcliffe	(United Kingdom) Triple 888 Racing													17	13	0
	(Germany) René Münnich	(Germany) All-Inkl.com Münnich Motorsport							14	Ret							0
	(Czech Republic) Tomas Pivoda	(Austria) Grasser Racing Team											14	DNS	DNS	DNS	0
	(Germany) Christopher Mies (South Africa) Kelvin van der Linde	(Germany) Prosperia ABT Racing													Ret	15	0
	(Germany) Michael Bartels (Netherlands) Yelmer Buurman	(Germany) Vita4one Racing Team											18	16			0
	(Portugal) Álvaro Parente	(Italy) Bhaitech													20	16	0
	(Portugal) António Coimbra (Portugal) Luis Silva	(Portugal) Sports and You									18	20					0
	(United Kingdom) Robert Bell (France) Kévin Estre	(Belgium) Boutsen Ginion													21	18	0
	(Portugal) Francisco Mora (Portugal) Paulo Pinheiro	(Portugal) Sports and You									Ret	18					0
	(Germany) Jens Klingmann (Brazil) Miguel Paludo	(Germany) BMW Sports Trophy Team Schubert													Ret	Ret	0
	(Switzerland) Philipp Frommenwiler (United Kingdom) Nick Tandy	(Germany) Farnbacher Racing			DNS	DNS											0

Key
Colour	Result
Gold	Race winner
Silver	2nd place
Bronze	3rd place
Green	Points finish
Blue	Non-points finish
Blue	Non-classified finish (NC)
Purple	Did not finish (Ret)
Black	Disqualified (DSQ)
Black	Excluded (EX)
White	Did not start (DNS)
White	Race cancelled (C)
White	Withdrew (WD)
Blank	Did not participate

**Bold** – Pole

==== Pro-Am Trophy ====
Pos.	Driver	Team	NOG (France)		BRH (United Kingdom)		ZAN (Netherlands)		SVK (Slovakia)		ALG (Portugal)		ZOL (Belgium)		BAK (Azerbaijan)		Total
Pos.	Driver	Team	QR	CR	QR	CR	QR	CR	QR	CR	QR	CR	QR	CR	QR	CR	Total
1	(Germany) Marc Basseng (United Kingdom) Alessandro Latif	(Germany) Phoenix Racing			**13**	11	**10**	13	**8**	7	**11**	7	**15**	15	**DNS**	DNS	162
2	(Austria) Sascha Halek (Austria) Stefan Landmann	(Austria) Grasser Racing Team			15	15	8	6	16	12	16	19					100
3	(Estonia) Marko Asmer (Russia) Aleksey Vasilyev	(Russia) GT Russian Team											20	Ret	18	12	39
4	(Portugal) Francisco Mora (Portugal) Paulo Pinheiro	(Portugal) Sports and You									Ret	18					18
5	(Portugal) António Coimbra (Portugal) Luis Silva	(Portugal) Sports and You									18	20					16
6	(Switzerland) Marc A. Hayek (Netherlands) Peter Kox	(Switzerland) Blancpain Racing	**12**	Ret													9
7	(Germany) René Münnich	(Germany) All-Inkl.com Münnich Motorsport							14	Ret							6

==== Silver Cup ====
Pos.	Driver	Team	NOG (France)		BRH (United Kingdom)		ZAN (Netherlands)		SVK (Slovakia)		ALG (Portugal)		ZOL (Belgium)		BAK (Azerbaijan)		Total
Pos.	Driver	Team	QR	CR	QR	CR	QR	CR	QR	CR	QR	CR	QR	CR	QR	CR	Total
1	(France) Vincent Abril (Poland) Mateusz Lisowski	(Belgium) Belgian Audi Club Team WRT	**7**	3	12	6	**11**	9	6	9	7	Ret	17	11	Ret	17	174
2	(Italy) Stefano Colombo (Italy) David Fumanelli	(Italy) ROAL Motorsport	15	11	**11**	10	15	12	**5**	13	Ret	15	**12**	17	**Ret**	14	154
3	(Spain) Miguel Toril	(United Kingdom) Fortec Motorsport	13	12	16	14	14	16	11	10	15	Ret	Ret	14	16	11	132
4	(Germany) Luca Stolz (Germany) Lucas Wolf	(Germany) HTP Motorsport							17	5	**8**	17	19	12	19	DNS	79
5	(India) Armaan Ebrahim	(United Kingdom) Fortec Motorsport	DNS	DNS	16	14	14	16	11	10	15	Ret					63
6	(United Kingdom) Benjamin Hetherington	(United Kingdom) Fortec Motorsport	DNS	DNS									Ret	14	16	11	48
7	(United Kingdom) Joe Osborne (United Kingdom) Ryan Ratcliffe	(United Kingdom) Triple 888 Racing													17	13	24
8	(Germany) Nico Bastian	(United Kingdom) Fortec Motorsport	13	12													21
Guest drivers ineligible for Silver Cup points
	(Germany) Sven Barth (Germany) David Jahn	(Germany) Callaway – RWT													14	8	

=== Teams' Championship ===
==== Cup ====
Pos.	Team	Manufacturer	NOG (France)		BRH (United Kingdom)		ZAN (Netherlands)		SVK (Slovakia)		ALG (Portugal)		ZOL (Belgium)		BAK (Azerbaijan)		Total
Pos.	Team	Manufacturer	QR	CR	QR	CR	QR	CR	QR	CR	QR	CR	QR	CR	QR	CR	Total
1	(Belgium) Belgian Audi Club Team WRT	Audi	1	3	**6**	4	3	1	**1**	3	3	3	**1**	3	**1**	1	168
2	(Germany) HTP Motorsport	Mercedes-Benz	5	1	2	2	2	4	3	4	2	1	6	1	9	Ret	146
3	(Austria) Grasser Racing Team	Lamborghini	**9**	6	1	1	**1**	5	2	12	1	2	3	2	15	Ret	123
4	(Brazil) BMW Sports Trophy Team Brasil	BMW	3	4	3	3	12	8	4	2	9	14	21	8	10	9	81
5	(Germany) Phoenix Racing	Audi	2	9	5	11	10	11	8	7	11	6	15	15	6	3	66
6	(Germany) BMW Sports Trophy Team Schubert	BMW					5	2	Ret	1	13	13	8	Ret	Ret	Ret	51
7	(Italy) Bhaitech	McLaren	11	8	8	12	7	15	13	8	12	10	7	6	12	7	50
8	(Russia) G-Drive Racing	Audi	4	2	Ret	13	9	Ret									43
8	(Russia) G-Drive Racing	Lamborghini									**6**	4	13	9			43
9	(United Kingdom) Beechdean AMR	Aston Martin											5	5	2	2	40
10	(Italy) ROAL Motorsport	BMW	14	11	11	5	15	12	5	13	14	9	10	13	Ret	14	29
11	(Italy) Scuderia Villorba Corse	Ferrari	8	10	7	7	17	DNS	Ret	DNS			9	7			22
12	(Germany) Tonino Team Herberth	Porsche					6	3									17
13	(United Kingdom) Fortec Motorsport	Mercedes-Benz	13	12	16	14	14	16	11	10	15	Ret	Ret	14	16	11	15
14	(Belgium) Boutsen Ginion	McLaren													7	6	15
15	(Germany) Reiter Engineering	Lamborghini			9	Ret	16	7	Ret	DNS							8
16	(Russia) GT Russian Team	Mercedes-Benz											20	Ret	18	12	4
17	(United Kingdom) Triple 888 Racing	BMW													17	13	2
18	(Portugal) Sports and You	Mercedes-Benz									18	18					1
	(Switzerland) Blancpain Racing	Lamborghini	12	Ret													0
	(Germany) All-Inkl.com Münnich Motorsport	Mercedes-Benz							14	Ret							0
	(Germany) Farnbacher Racing	Porsche			DNS	DNS											0
Guest teams ineligible for points
	(Belgium) NSC Motorsports	Lamborghini											2	Ret			0
	(Germany) Schütz Motorsport	Porsche													5	5	0
	(Germany) Callaway – RWT	Chevrolet													8	8	0
	(Germany) Zakspeed	Mercedes-Benz													13	10	0
	(United Kingdom) Trackspeed	Porsche													11	Ret	0
	(Germany) Prosperia ABT Racing	Audi													Ret	15	0
	(Germany) Vita4one Racing Team	BMW											18	16			0

Key
Colour	Result
Gold	Race winner
Silver	2nd place
Bronze	3rd place
Green	Points finish
Blue	Non-points finish
Blue	Non-classified finish (NC)
Purple	Did not finish (Ret)
Black	Disqualified (DSQ)
Black	Excluded (EX)
White	Did not start (DNS)
White	Race cancelled (C)
White	Withdrew (WD)
Blank	Did not participate

**Bold** – Pole

==== Pro-Am Trophy ====
Pos.	Team	Manufacturer	NOG (France)		BRH (United Kingdom)		ZAN (Netherlands)		SVK (Slovakia)		ALG (Portugal)		ZOL (Belgium)		BAK (Azerbaijan)		Total
Pos.	Team	Manufacturer	QR	CR	QR	CR	QR	CR	QR	CR	QR	CR	QR	CR	QR	CR	Total
1	(Germany) Phoenix Racing	Audi			**13**	11	**10**	13	**8**	7	**11**	7	**15**	15	**DNS**	DNS	162
2	(Austria) Grasser Racing Team	Lamborghini			15	15	8	6	16	12	16	19					100
3	(Russia) GT Russian Team	Mercedes-Benz											20	Ret	18	12	39
4	(Portugal) Sports and You	Mercedes-Benz									18	18					22
5	(Switzerland) Blancpain Racing	Lamborghini	**12**	Ret													9
6	(Germany) All-Inkl.com Münnich Motorsport	Mercedes-Benz							14	Ret							6

==== Silver Cup ====
Pos.	Team	Manufacturer	NOG (France)		BRH (United Kingdom)		ZAN (Netherlands)		SVK (Slovakia)		ALG (Portugal)		ZOL (Belgium)		BAK (Azerbaijan)		Total
Pos.	Team	Manufacturer	QR	CR	QR	CR	QR	CR	QR	CR	QR	CR	QR	CR	QR	CR	Total
1	(Belgium) Belgian Audi Club Team WRT	Audi	**7**	3	12	6	**11**	9	6	9	7	Ret	17	11	Ret	17	174
2	(Italy) ROAL Motorsport	BMW	15	11	**11**	10	15	12	**5**	13	Ret	15	**12**	17	**Ret**	14	154
3	(United Kingdom) Fortec Motorsport	Mercedes-Benz	13	12	16	14	14	16	11	10	15	Ret	Ret	14	16	11	132
4	(Germany) HTP Motorsport	Mercedes-Benz							17	5	**8**	17	19	12	19	DNS	79
5	(United Kingdom) Triple 888 Racing	BMW													17	13	24
Guest teams ineligible for Silver Cup points
	(Germany) Callaway – RWT	Chevrolet													14	8	0

== See also ==
- 2014 Blancpain GT Series
- 2014 Blancpain Endurance Series
