= 2012 Eurocup Formula Renault 2.0 =

Motor racing competition

Seasons
- ← 2011 2013 →

The 2012 Eurocup Formula Renault 2.0 season was the 22nd Eurocup Formula Renault 2.0 season. The season commenced on 5 May at Alcañiz and ended on 21 October at Barcelona. The season featured seven double-header rounds, with each race lasting for a duration of 30 minutes. All races were part of the World Series by Renault.

Red Bull Junior's Daniil Kvyat won the opening race of the season at Motorland Aragón after qualifying on pole position by 0.1 seconds. Newcomer Nyck de Vries finished in second place and returnee Stoffel Vandoorne attained his maiden podium in third. The race was red-flagged after a violent crash between Daniel Cammish and Hans Villemi, with Villemi flipping over the back of Cammish's car. Both drivers suffered long-term injuries in the crash, and have yet to return to the series. iRace Professional driver Óscar Tunjo of Tech 1 Racing started the Sunday race from pole position but he was passed by Kvyat at the second turn of the first lap. Kvyat scored his first Eurocup double win, ahead of Tunjo and RC Formula's Norman Nato.

A month later at Spa, R-ace GP's Pierre Gasly claimed his first pole position. Gasly had a bad getaway and lost positions to both Nato and Vandoorne. Nato scored his first win in the series, while Gasly scored his first series podium. Gasly's teammate Andrea Pizzitola was the fastest in the second qualifying session. The race was held in heavy rain, and was red-flagged after an incident at Kemmel, involving Nato and team-mate Javier Tarancón, Koiranen Motorsport's Stefan Wackerbauer and Victor Franzoni, Tunjo and team-mate Matthieu Vaxivière, Fortec Motorsports' Dan de Zille and KTR's Yu Kanamaru. Kvyat coped with conditions better than others, claiming his third win of the season, ahead of Fortec driver Jake Dennis and Vandoorne completed the podium.

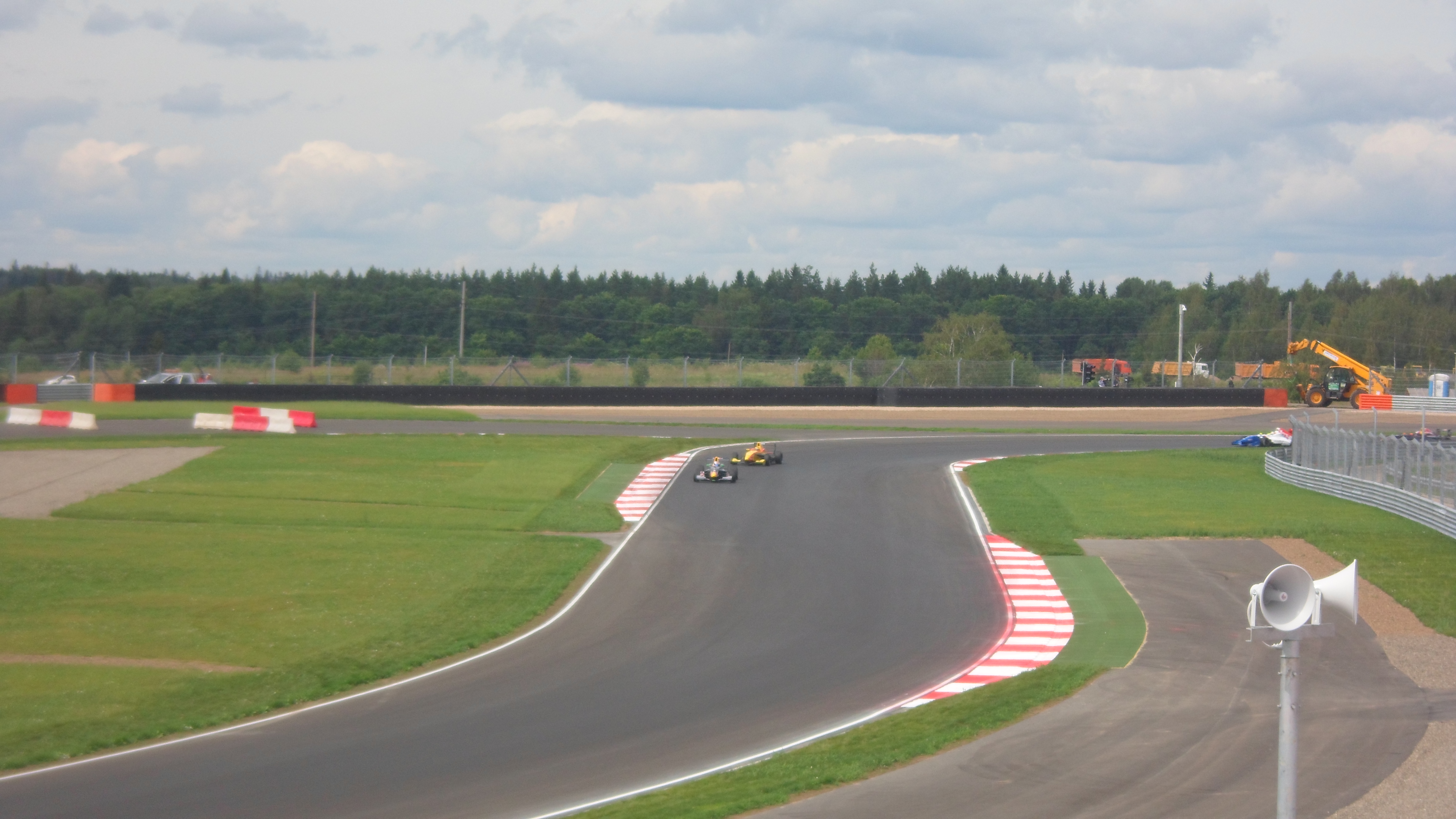
Daniil Kvyat leads Stoffel Vandoorne in the first race at Moscow Raceway, the track's first major event. Kvyat won both races in Moscow to take the championship lead by one point from Vandoorne.

The next Eurocup stop was at the Nürburgring, where Vandoorne set the fastest time in qualifying, before he converted pole position into victory. Nato and Tech 1's Paul-Loup Chatin joined Vandoorne on the podium. Vandoorne led from start to finish the next day, claiming the pole and won the race with fastest lap. Interwetten.com Racing's Melville McKee and Gasly completed the podium. Vandoorne's double win gave him the championship lead.

Two weeks later, the series visited Russia for the first time, at the newly inaugurated Moscow Raceway. In both qualification sessions, Vandoorne was faster than Kvyat. However, Kvyat won both races to retake the championship lead from Vandoorne. Vandoorne took a pair of second places in Moscow, while Oliver Rowland took his first Eurocup podiums with a brace of third places.

== Teams and drivers ==
Team	No.	Driver name	Class	Rounds
(Finland) Koiranen Motorsport	1	(Finland) Patrick Kujala	J	All
(Finland) Koiranen Motorsport	2	(France) Esteban Ocon	J	All
(Finland) Koiranen Motorsport	3	(Russia) Daniil Kvyat	J	All
(Finland) Koiranen Motorsport	4	(Germany) Stefan Wackerbauer	J	All
(Finland) Koiranen Motorsport	60	(Estonia) Hans Villemi		1, 6
(Finland) Koiranen Motorsport	60	(Brazil) Victor Franzoni		2
(Germany) Josef Kaufmann Racing	5	(Netherlands) Pieter Schothorst		All
(Germany) Josef Kaufmann Racing	6	(Spain) Alex Riberas		All
(Germany) Josef Kaufmann Racing	7	(Belgium) Stoffel Vandoorne		All
(United Kingdom) Fortec Motorsports	8	(Finland) Mikko Pakari	J	All
(United Kingdom) Fortec Motorsports	9	(New Zealand) Nick Cassidy	J	1–3
(United Kingdom) Fortec Motorsports	9	(Russia) Alexey Chuklin		4
(United Kingdom) Fortec Motorsports	9	(Netherlands) Steijn Schothorst	J	5
(United Kingdom) Fortec Motorsports	9	(United States) Gustavo Menezes		6
(United Kingdom) Fortec Motorsports	9	(Russia) Egor Orudzhev		7
(United Kingdom) Fortec Motorsports	10	(United Kingdom) Ed Jones		All
(United Kingdom) Fortec Motorsports	44	(United Kingdom) Oliver Rowland		All
(United Kingdom) Fortec Motorsports	62	(United Kingdom) Jake Dennis	J	2–3, 7
(United Kingdom) Fortec Motorsports	63	(United Kingdom) Dan de Zille		2
(United Kingdom) Fortec Motorsports	64	(United Kingdom) Josh Hill		2, 7
(France) Tech 1 Racing	11	(France) Paul-Loup Chatin		All
(France) Tech 1 Racing	12	(France) Matthieu Vaxivière	J	All
(France) Tech 1 Racing	14	(Colombia) Óscar Tunjo	J	All
(France) Tech 1 Racing	15	(Russia) Roman Mavlanov	J	All
(France) Tech 1 Racing	66	(Brazil) Felipe Fraga	J	3, 5–7
(Belgium) KTR	16	(Finland) Miki Weckstrom		1–4
(Belgium) KTR	16	(Spain) Victor Colomé		7
(Belgium) KTR	17	(Japan) Yu Kanamaru	J	All
(Belgium) KTR	18	(Italy) Ignazio D'Agosto	J	All
(Spain) EPIC Racing	20	(United Kingdom) Alexander Albon	J	All
(Spain) EPIC Racing	21	(Italy) Kevin Giovesi		1
(Spain) EPIC Racing	21	(Germany) Dennis Wüsthoff		2
(Spain) EPIC Racing	21	(Russia) Konstantin Tereshchenko		4
(Spain) EPIC Racing	21	(Switzerland) Kevin Jörg		7
(Spain) EPIC Racing	22	(Switzerland) Christof von Grünigen		All
(Austria) Interwetten.com Racing	23	(Sweden) Timmy Hansen		1–4
(Austria) Interwetten.com Racing	23	(Russia) Konstantin Tereshchenko		5, 7
(Austria) Interwetten.com Racing	24	(United Kingdom) Melville McKee	J	All
(Austria) Interwetten.com Racing	25	(Brazil) Guilherme Silva	J	All
(France) R-ace GP	26	(Netherlands) Nyck de Vries	J	All
(France) R-ace GP	27	(France) Pierre Gasly	J	All
(France) R-ace GP	28	(France) Andrea Pizzitola		All
(France) ARTA Engineering	29	(France) William Vermont		1–4, 6–7
(France) ARTA Engineering	30	(France) Léo Roussel	J	All
(France) ARTA Engineering	65	(France) Tristan Papavoine		2, 6
(France) ARTA Engineering	68	(Andorra) Alex Loan		7
(Netherlands) Manor MP Motorsport	31	(Denmark) Johan Jokinen		1–2
(Netherlands) Manor MP Motorsport	31	(Thailand) Tanart Sathienthirakul		3
(Netherlands) Manor MP Motorsport	31	(Sweden) Kevin Kleveros		5
(Netherlands) Manor MP Motorsport	31	(Netherlands) Steijn Schothorst	J	4, 6–7
(Netherlands) Manor MP Motorsport	61	(Netherlands) Steijn Schothorst	J	2–3
(Netherlands) Manor MP Motorsport	32	(United Kingdom) Jordan King		All
(Netherlands) Manor MP Motorsport	33	(Netherlands) Meindert van Buuren	J	1–4, 6–7
(Netherlands) Manor MP Motorsport	33	(Thailand) Tanart Sathienthirakul		5
(Luxembourg) RC Formula	36	(France) Norman Nato		All
(Luxembourg) RC Formula	37	(Spain) Javier Tarancón		1–6
(Luxembourg) RC Formula	45	(Italy) Edolo Ghirelli		1–2
(Luxembourg) RC Formula	45	(France) Aurélien Panis	J	5–7
(United Kingdom) Atech Reid GP	38	(United Kingdom) Alessandro Latif	J	1–3
(United Kingdom) Atech Reid GP	38	(Estonia) Hans Villemi		7
(United Kingdom) Atech Reid GP	39	(United Kingdom) Daniel Cammish		1
(United Kingdom) Atech Reid GP	39	(Russia) Roman Beregech		4
(United Kingdom) Atech Reid GP	39	(United Kingdom) Dan Wells		7
(United Kingdom) Mark Burdett Motorsport	67	(Brazil) Gabriel Casagrande	J	3

Icon	Class
J	Junior Class

== Race calendar and results ==
The calendar for the 2012 season was announced on 10 October 2011, the day after the end of the 2011 season. Silverstone Circuit was dropped from the calendar in favour of a round at the new Moscow Raceway in Russia. All seven rounds formed meetings of the 2012 World Series by Renault season.

Round		Circuit	Country	Date	Pole position	Fastest lap	Winning driver	Winning team
1	R1	Ciudad del Motor de Aragón, Alcañiz	Spain	5 May	(Russia) Daniil Kvyat	(Russia) Daniil Kvyat	(Russia) Daniil Kvyat	(Finland) Koiranen Motorsport
1	R2	Ciudad del Motor de Aragón, Alcañiz	Spain	6 May	(Colombia) Óscar Tunjo	(Russia) Daniil Kvyat	(Russia) Daniil Kvyat	(Finland) Koiranen Motorsport
2	R1	Circuit de Spa-Francorchamps	Belgium	2 June	(France) Pierre Gasly	(Russia) Daniil Kvyat	(France) Norman Nato	(Luxembourg) RC Formula
2	R2	Circuit de Spa-Francorchamps	Belgium	3 June	(France) Andrea Pizzitola	(Russia) Daniil Kvyat	(Russia) Daniil Kvyat	(Finland) Koiranen Motorsport
3	R1	Nürburgring	Germany	30 June	(Belgium) Stoffel Vandoorne	(France) Norman Nato	(Belgium) Stoffel Vandoorne	(Germany) Josef Kaufmann Racing
3	R2	Nürburgring	Germany	1 July	(Belgium) Stoffel Vandoorne	(Belgium) Stoffel Vandoorne	(Belgium) Stoffel Vandoorne	(Germany) Josef Kaufmann Racing
4	R1	Moscow Raceway	Russia	14 July	(Belgium) Stoffel Vandoorne	(Belgium) Stoffel Vandoorne	(Russia) Daniil Kvyat	(Finland) Koiranen Motorsport
4	R2	Moscow Raceway	Russia	15 July	(Belgium) Stoffel Vandoorne	(Russia) Daniil Kvyat	(Russia) Daniil Kvyat	(Finland) Koiranen Motorsport
5	R1	Hungaroring, Mogyoród	Hungary	15 September	(Belgium) Stoffel Vandoorne	(Belgium) Stoffel Vandoorne	(Belgium) Stoffel Vandoorne	(Germany) Josef Kaufmann Racing
5	R2	Hungaroring, Mogyoród	Hungary	16 September	(Russia) Daniil Kvyat	(Netherlands) Nyck de Vries	(Russia) Daniil Kvyat	(Finland) Koiranen Motorsport
6	R1	Circuit Paul Ricard, Le Castellet	France	29 September	(Spain) Javier Tarancón	(Spain) Alex Riberas	(Belgium) Stoffel Vandoorne	(Germany) Josef Kaufmann Racing
6	R2	Circuit Paul Ricard, Le Castellet	France	30 September	(Belgium) Stoffel Vandoorne	(France) Paul-Loup Chatin	(Russia) Daniil Kvyat	(Finland) Koiranen Motorsport
7	R1	Circuit de Catalunya, Montmeló	Spain	20 October	(Colombia) Óscar Tunjo	(United Kingdom) Melville McKee	(Colombia) Óscar Tunjo	(France) Tech 1 Racing
7	R2	Circuit de Catalunya, Montmeló	Spain	21 October	(Russia) Daniil Kvyat	(Spain) Alex Riberas	(United Kingdom) Oliver Rowland	(United Kingdom) Fortec Motorsports

== Championship standings ==
- Points for both championships were awarded as follows:

1st	2nd	3rd	4th	5th	6th	7th	8th	9th	10th
25	18	15	12	10	8	6	4	2	1

=== Drivers' Championship ===
Pos	Driver	ARA (Spain)		SPA (Belgium)		NÜR (Germany)		MSC (Russia)		HUN (Hungary)		LEC (France)		CAT (Spain)		Points
Pos	Driver	1	2	3	4	5	6	7	8	9	10	11	12	13	14	Points
1	(Belgium) Stoffel Vandoorne	3	4	2	3	**1**	**1**	**2**	**2**	**1**	4	1	**2**	2	Ret	244
2	(Russia) Daniil Kvyat	**1**	1	4	1	5	22	1	1	Ret	**1**	2	1	3	**8**	234
3	(United Kingdom) Oliver Rowland	6	8	26	4	8	Ret	3	3	16	6	15	6	5	1	109
4	(France) Norman Nato	4	3	1	Ret	2	Ret	23	9	6	3	10	17	15	16	96
5	(Netherlands) Nyck de Vries	2	16	Ret	16	4	Ret	Ret	4	4	2	7	13	22	27	78
6	(France) Paul-Loup Chatin	5	10	6	5	3	4	12	10	12	15	14	4	6	28	77
7	(Colombia) Óscar Tunjo	Ret	**2**	12	Ret	22	21	11	11	7	7	4	18	**1**	7	73
8	(United Kingdom) Melville McKee	Ret	15	Ret	14	9	2	6	7	8	5	8	7	7	Ret	64
9	(Spain) Alex Riberas	10	11	5	19	6	Ret	7	Ret	5	10	17	8	4	5	62
10	(France) Pierre Gasly	Ret	7	**3**	25	32	3	14	8	11	11	Ret	Ret	10	6	49
11	(Germany) Stefan Wackerbauer	11	28	9	Ret	Ret	Ret	4	6	14	9	6	11	16	13	32
12	(United Kingdom) Jake Dennis			10	2	14	24							12	4	31
13	(United Kingdom) Jordan King	Ret	Ret	7	12	Ret	5	13	Ret	3	13	20	Ret	Ret	25	31
14	(France) Esteban Ocon	19	5	21	24	12	18	8	Ret	21	18	9	3	Ret	Ret	31
15	(Finland) Mikko Pakari	14	23	Ret	26	11	23	5	Ret	2	23	12	Ret	20	9	30
16	(France) William Vermont	26	20	14	11	31	Ret	10	16			13	5	26	2	29
17	(Brazil) Guilherme Silva	9	9	15	9	15	10	9	14	Ret	17	3	21	Ret	19	24
18	(Brazil) Felipe Fraga					10	8			30	25	18	10	13	3	21
19	(Spain) Javier Tarancón	7	Ret	8	Ret	16	7	16	18	10	8	**11**	15			21
20	(Finland) Miki Weckstrom	8	14	34	6	7	Ret	31	17							18
21	(France) Andrea Pizzitola	12	12	32	**13**	13	9	19	12	Ret	16	5	16	Ret	18	12
22	(Netherlands) Steijn Schothorst			Ret	22	18	6	30	13	20	14	Ret	14	8	22	12
23	(Finland) Patrick Kujala	15	Ret	17	18	19	25	15	5	13	19	23	Ret	Ret	20	10
24	(New Zealand) Nick Cassidy	Ret	6	Ret	DNS	17	11									8
25	(United Kingdom) Josh Hill			Ret	7									9	Ret	8
26	(Italy) Ignazio D'Agosto	22	Ret	25	8	25	26	24	Ret	29	27	Ret	Ret	25	23	4
27	(United Kingdom) Ed Jones	18	25	16	31	21	16	18	Ret	24	31	28	9	23	11	2
28	(Netherlands) Pieter Schothorst	Ret	19	28	29	Ret	12	17	20	9	21	21	Ret	19	14	2
29	(France) Matthieu Vaxivière	16	22	20	NC	Ret	14	25	Ret	23	20	Ret	Ret	27	10	1
30	(Switzerland) Christof von Grünigen	25	Ret	30	10	27	Ret	32	19	22	Ret	25	22	DNS	DNS	1
31	(Sweden) Timmy Hansen	13	13	11	17	Ret	DNS	20	15							0
32	(Netherlands) Meindert van Buuren	Ret	Ret	18	15	20	Ret	22	21			Ret	23	11	Ret	0
33	(Russia) Roman Mavlanov	17	21	33	28	26	13	21	Ret	15	12	26	Ret	17	Ret	0
34	(France) Tristan Papavoine			24	21							22	12			0
35	(Denmark) Johan Jokinen	Ret	17	13	Ret											0
36	(Estonia) Hans Villemi	Ret	DNS									16	Ret	14	15	0
37	(Brazil) Gabriel Casagrande					29	15									0
38	(United Kingdom) Alexander Albon	21	24	19	20	23	Ret	Ret	DNS	17	24	19	24	Ret	26	0
39	(Japan) Yu Kanamaru	Ret	29	27	32	24	17	Ret	25	27	26	Ret	Ret	DSQ	24	0
40	(France) Léo Roussel	24	26	23	Ret	33	Ret	26	26	18	Ret	Ret	19	Ret	Ret	0
41	(Italy) Kevin Giovesi	20	18													0
42	(Thailand) Tanart Sathienthirakul					28	19			26	28					0
43	(United Kingdom) Alessandro Latif	23	27	35	27	30	20									0
44	(Russia) Konstantin Tereshchenko							29	22	28	29			21	21	0
45	(Brazil) Victor Franzoni			22	Ret											0
46	(Russia) Aleksey Chuklin							28	23							0
47	(Germany) Dennis Wüsthoff			29	23											0
48	(Russia) Roman Beregech							27	24							0
49	(Italy) Edolo Ghirelli	Ret	Ret	31	30											0
	(United Kingdom) Dan de Zille			Ret	Ret											0
	(United Kingdom) Daniel Cammish	Ret	DNS													0
Guest drivers ineligible for points
	(France) Aurélien Panis									19	22	27	Ret	18	17	0
	(United States) Gustavo Menezes											24	20			0
	(United Kingdom) Dan Wells													24	Ret	0
	(Sweden) Kevin Kleveros									25	30					0
	(Andorra) Alex Loan													28	DNS	0
	(Spain) Victor Colomé													29	Ret	0
	(Russia) Egor Orudzhev													Ret	Ret	0
	(Switzerland) Kevin Jörg													Ret	DNS	0
Pos	Driver	ARA (Spain)		SPA (Belgium)		NÜR (Germany)		MSC (Russia)		HUN (Hungary)		LEC (France)		CAT (Spain)		Points

Colour	Result
Gold	Winner
Silver	Second place
Bronze	Third place
Green	Points classification
Blue	Non-points classification
Blue	Non-classified finish (NC)
Purple	Retired, not classified (Ret)
Red	Did not qualify (DNQ)
Red	Did not pre-qualify (DNPQ)
Black	Disqualified (DSQ)
White	Did not start (DNS)
White	Withdrew (WD)
White	Race cancelled (C)
Blank	Did not practice (DNP)
Blank	Did not arrive (DNA)
Blank	Excluded (EX)

**Bold** – Pole
Italics – Fastest Lap

=== Teams' Championship ===
Prior to each round of the championship, two drivers from each team – if applicable – are nominated to score teams' championship points.

Pos	Team	Points
1	(Germany) Josef Kaufmann Racing	306
2	(Finland) Koiranen Motorsport	265
3	(United Kingdom) Fortec Motorsports	157
4	(France) Tech 1 Racing	150
5	(France) R-ace GP	127
6	(Luxembourg) RC Formula	117
7	(Austria) Interwetten.com Racing	62
8	(Netherlands) Manor MP Motorsport	43
9	(France) ARTA Engineering	29
10	(Belgium) KTR	22
11	(Spain) EPIC Racing	1
