= 2013 British Formula Ford Championship =

The 2013 Dunlop MSA Formula Ford Championship of Great Britain was a multi-event, open-wheel single seater motor racing championship held across England and Scotland. The championship featured a mix of professional motor racing teams and privately funded drivers, competing in Formula Ford cars that conform to the technical regulations for the championship. This season saw the championship adopt a single class format, with all drivers using the latest cars built to the Formula Ford EcoBoost specification. There was also an award for the highest placed rookie. It was the 37th British Formula Ford season and returned to the TOCA tour to form part of the extensive program of support categories built up around the BTCC centrepiece.

The season commenced on 31 March at Brands Hatch – on the circuit's Indy configuration – and concluded on 13 October at the same venue, utilising the Grand Prix circuit, after thirty races to be held at ten meetings, all in support of the 2013 British Touring Car Championship.

== Championship changes ==
Along with the move to support the BTCC, the championship underwent several other technical changes. The championship adopted the new Formula Ford EcoBoost 200 regulations, which included an increase in the EcoBoost engine power from the previous season, along with the new addition of a fully adjustable aerodynamic package which includes front and rear wings previously never seen before in the British Formula Ford Championship. In late October 2012, the series organisers announced that from this season Duratec class cars will be ineligible for the championship, leaving only the EcoBoost class.

== Drivers and teams ==
All teams are British-registered.

2013 Entry List
Team	Chassis/Engine	No.	Driver	Class	Rounds
JTR	Mygale M12-SJ/Mountune	1	(United Kingdom) Dan Cammish		8
JTR	Mygale M13-SJ/Mountune	1	(United Kingdom) Dan Cammish		1–7
JTR	Mygale M13-SJ/Mountune	2	(United Kingdom) Sam Brabham (Note: Sam Brabham is an Australian racing driver, but competed for Britain under the Nations Cup rules.)	S	2–10
JTR	Mygale M12-SJ/Mountune	18	(United Kingdom) Max Marshall		9–10
JTR	Mygale M12-SJ/Mountune	34	(United States) Camren Kaminsky		8–10
JTR	Mygale M13-SJ/Mountune	34	(United States) Camren Kaminsky		1–7
Falcon Motorsport	Mygale M12-SJ/Scholar	3	(United Kingdom) Luke Reade	S	8–10
Falcon Motorsport	Mygale M12-SJ/Scholar	9	(Finland) Lassi Halminen		1–3, 5
Falcon Motorsport	Mygale M13-SJ/Scholar	4	(United Kingdom) David Wagner		3
Falcon Motorsport	Mygale M13-SJ/Scholar	6	(United Kingdom) Harrison Scott	S	All
Falcon Motorsport	Mygale M13-SJ/Scholar	7	(United Kingdom) Neil Winn		1
Falcon Motorsport	Mygale M13-SJ/Scholar	72	(Hong Kong) Shaun Thong		5
Falcon Motorsport	Mygale M13-SJ/Scholar	78	(Macau) Wing Chung Chang	G	8–9
Falcon Motorsport	Mygale M13-SJ/Scholar	81	(United Kingdom) Simon Rudd	G	10
Richardson Racing	Mygale M12-SJ/Scholar	5	(United Kingdom) Andy Richardson		1–2
Richardson Racing	Mygale M12-SJ/Scholar	5	(United Kingdom) Andy Richardson	S	3–10
Enigma Motorsport	Mygale M12-SJ/Scholar	17	(United Kingdom) George Blundell		1–3
SWB Motorsport	Sinter LA12/Scholar	21	(United Kingdom) Fred Martin-Dye	S	2–3
SWB Motorsport	Sinter LA12/Scholar	28	(United Kingdom) Jack Dex		8
SWB Motorsport	Sinter LA12/Scholar	71	(United Kingdom) Rob Shield		5
SWB Motorsport	Sinter LA12/Scholar	95	(Kuwait) Zaid Ashkanani	S	6
Jamun Racing	Mygale M12-SJ/Scholar	23	(United Kingdom) Scott Malvern		1
Jamun Racing	Mygale M12-SJ/Scholar	24	(United Kingdom) Luke Williams		1–3
Jamun Racing	Mygale M12-SJ/Scholar	25	(Argentina) Pablo Maranzana	S	1–7
Jamun Racing	Mygale M12-SJ/Scholar	26	(Argentina) Juan Angel Rosso		2–10
Jamun Racing	Mygale M12-SJ/Scholar	27	(South Africa) Jayde Kruger		4–10
Jamun Racing	Mygale M12-SJ/Scholar	37	(United Kingdom) Ben Anderson	G	1
Jamun Racing	Mygale M12-SJ/Scholar	73	(United Kingdom) Sam MacLeod		5
Radical Sportscars	Sinter LA12/Scholar	74	(United Kingdom) James Abbott		1–4
Radical Sportscars	Mygale M13-SJ/Scholar	74	(United Kingdom) James Abbott		5–10
Meridian Motorsport	Mygale M12-SJ/Scholar	82	(United Kingdom) Connor Mills	S	6, 8–10

Icon	Class
G	Guest
S	Scholarship

== Race calendar and results ==
The provisional calendar was announced by the BTCC organisers on 29 August 2012.

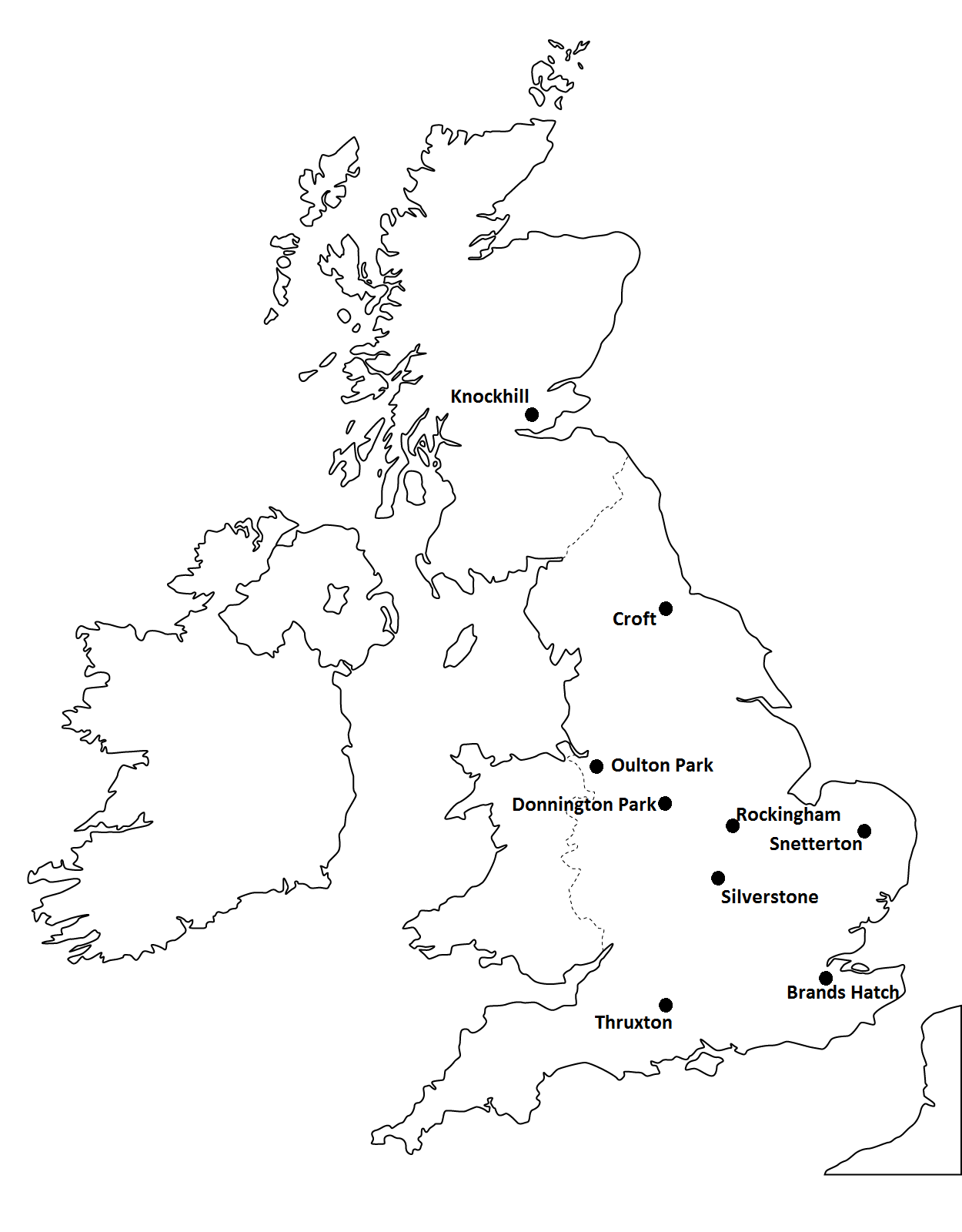
Circuits for the 2013 season

Round		Circuit	Date	Pole position	Fastest lap	Winning driver	Winning team	Scholarship winner
1	R1	Brands Hatch (Indy Circuit, Kent)	30 March	(United Kingdom) Dan Cammish	(United Kingdom) Dan Cammish	(United Kingdom) Dan Cammish	JTR	(Argentina) Pablo Maranzana
1	R2	Brands Hatch (Indy Circuit, Kent)	31 March	(United Kingdom) Dan Cammish	(United Kingdom) Scott Malvern	(United Kingdom) Dan Cammish	JTR	(Argentina) Pablo Maranzana
1	R3	Brands Hatch (Indy Circuit, Kent)	31 March	(United Kingdom) Dan Cammish	(United Kingdom) Scott Malvern	(United Kingdom) Dan Cammish	JTR	(Argentina) Pablo Maranzana
2	R4	Donington Park (National Circuit, Leicestershire)	20 April	(United Kingdom) Dan Cammish	(United Kingdom) Dan Cammish	(United Kingdom) Dan Cammish	JTR	(United Kingdom) Harrison Scott
2	R5	Donington Park (National Circuit, Leicestershire)	21 April	(United Kingdom) Dan Cammish	(United Kingdom) Luke Williams	(United Kingdom) Dan Cammish	JTR	(United Kingdom) Harrison Scott
2	R6	Donington Park (National Circuit, Leicestershire)	21 April	(United Kingdom) Dan Cammish	(United Kingdom) Dan Cammish	(United Kingdom) Dan Cammish	JTR	(Argentina) Pablo Maranzana
3	R7	Thruxton Circuit (Hampshire)	4 May	(United Kingdom) Dan Cammish	(United Kingdom) Dan Cammish	(United Kingdom) Dan Cammish	JTR	(United Kingdom) Andy Richardson
3	R8	Thruxton Circuit (Hampshire)	4 May	(United Kingdom) Dan Cammish	(United Kingdom) Dan Cammish	(United Kingdom) Dan Cammish	JTR	(United Kingdom) Harrison Scott
3	R9	Thruxton Circuit (Hampshire)	5 May	(United Kingdom) Dan Cammish	(United Kingdom) Dan Cammish	(United Kingdom) Dan Cammish	JTR	(United Kingdom) Andy Richardson
4	R10	Oulton Park (Island Circuit, Cheshire)	8 June	(United Kingdom) Dan Cammish	(United Kingdom) Dan Cammish	(United Kingdom) Dan Cammish	JTR	(United Kingdom) Sam Brabham
4	R11	Oulton Park (Island Circuit, Cheshire)	9 June	(United Kingdom) Dan Cammish	(United Kingdom) Dan Cammish	(United Kingdom) Dan Cammish	JTR	(United Kingdom) Sam Brabham
4	R12	Oulton Park (Island Circuit, Cheshire)	9 June	(United Kingdom) Dan Cammish	(United Kingdom) Dan Cammish	(United Kingdom) Dan Cammish	JTR	(United Kingdom) Harrison Scott
5	R13	Croft Circuit (North Yorkshire)	22 June	(United Kingdom) Harrison Scott	(United Kingdom) Harrison Scott	(United Kingdom) Dan Cammish	JTR	(Argentina) Pablo Maranzana
5	R14	Croft Circuit (North Yorkshire)	22 June	(United Kingdom) Dan Cammish	(United Kingdom) Dan Cammish	(United Kingdom) Dan Cammish	JTR	(United Kingdom) Harrison Scott
5	R15	Croft Circuit (North Yorkshire)	23 June	(United Kingdom) Dan Cammish	(United Kingdom) Dan Cammish	(United Kingdom) Dan Cammish	JTR	(United Kingdom) Harrison Scott
6	R16	Snetterton Motor Racing Circuit (300 Circuit, Norfolk)	3 August	(United Kingdom) Dan Cammish	(United Kingdom) Dan Cammish	(United Kingdom) Dan Cammish	JTR	(United Kingdom) Harrison Scott
6	R17	Snetterton Motor Racing Circuit (300 Circuit, Norfolk)	4 August	(United Kingdom) Dan Cammish	(United Kingdom) Dan Cammish	(United Kingdom) Dan Cammish	JTR	(United Kingdom) Harrison Scott
6	R18	Snetterton Motor Racing Circuit (300 Circuit, Norfolk)	4 August	(United Kingdom) Dan Cammish	(United Kingdom) Dan Cammish	(United Kingdom) Dan Cammish	JTR	(United Kingdom) Harrison Scott
7	R19	Knockhill Racing Circuit (Fife)	24 August	(United Kingdom) Dan Cammish	(United Kingdom) Dan Cammish	(United Kingdom) Dan Cammish	JTR	(Argentina) Pablo Maranzana
7	R20	Knockhill Racing Circuit (Fife)	25 August	(Argentina) Pablo Maranzana	(United Kingdom) Dan Cammish	(United Kingdom) Dan Cammish	JTR	(Argentina) Pablo Maranzana
7	R21	Knockhill Racing Circuit (Fife)	25 August	(United Kingdom) Dan Cammish	(United Kingdom) Dan Cammish	(United Kingdom) Dan Cammish	JTR	(Argentina) Pablo Maranzana
8	R22	Rockingham Motor Speedway (International Super Sports Car Circuit, Northamptonshire)	14 September	(United Kingdom) Dan Cammish	(United Kingdom) Dan Cammish	(United Kingdom) Dan Cammish	JTR	(United Kingdom) Sam Brabham
8	R23	Rockingham Motor Speedway (International Super Sports Car Circuit, Northamptonshire)	15 September	(United Kingdom) Dan Cammish	(United Kingdom) Dan Cammish	(United Kingdom) Dan Cammish	JTR	(United Kingdom) Sam Brabham
8	R24	Rockingham Motor Speedway (International Super Sports Car Circuit, Northamptonshire)	15 September	(United Kingdom) Dan Cammish	(South Africa) Jayde Kruger	(United Kingdom) Dan Cammish	JTR	(United Kingdom) Harrison Scott
9	R25	Silverstone Circuit (National Circuit, Northamptonshire)	28 September	(United Kingdom) Max Marshall	(Argentina) Juan Angel Rosso	(United States) Camren Kaminsky	JTR	(United Kingdom) Sam Brabham
9	R26	Silverstone Circuit (National Circuit, Northamptonshire)	29 September	(United Kingdom) Max Marshall	(United Kingdom) Andy Richardson	(South Africa) Jayde Kruger	Jamun Racing	(United Kingdom) Sam Brabham
9	R27	Silverstone Circuit (National Circuit, Northamptonshire)	29 September	(United Kingdom) Max Marshall	(United Kingdom) Max Marshall	(United Kingdom) Harrison Scott	Falcon Motorsport	(United Kingdom) Harrison Scott
10	R28	Brands Hatch (Grand Prix Circuit, Kent)	12 October	(United Kingdom) James Abbott	(United Kingdom) Harrison Scott	(Argentina) Juan Angel Rosso	Jamun Racing	(United Kingdom) Harrison Scott
10	R29	Brands Hatch (Grand Prix Circuit, Kent)	13 October	(United Kingdom) Simon Rudd	(South Africa) Jayde Kruger	(Argentina) Juan Angel Rosso	Jamun Racing	(United Kingdom) Harrison Scott
10	R30	Brands Hatch (Grand Prix Circuit, Kent)	13 October	(Argentina) Juan Angel Rosso	(United Kingdom) Andy Richardson	(Argentina) Juan Angel Rosso	Jamun Racing	(United Kingdom) Andy Richardson

== Championship standings ==
=== Drivers' Championship ===
Pos	Driver	BHI			DON			THR			OUL			CRO			SNE			KNO			ROC			SIL			BHGP			Points
1	(United Kingdom) Dan Cammish	**1**	**1**	**1**	**1**	**1**	**1**	**1**	**1**	**1**	**1**	**1**	**1**	1	**1**	**1**	**1**	**1**	**1**	**1**	1	**1**	**1**	**1**	**1**							739
2	(United Kingdom) Harrison Scott	9	6	9	2	3	5	3	3	4	Ret	6	2	**8**	2	2	2	3	2	4	3	5	3	Ret	3	8	4	1	2	3	5	634
3	(Argentina) Juan Angel Rosso				4	2	2	4	2	2	Ret	Ret	8	3	6	5	4	5	4	5	6	4	4	3	4	2	2	4	1	1	**1**	591
4	(United Kingdom) Sam Brabham				5	7	6	8	10	5	2	4	6	6	7	10	Ret	Ret	3	3	4	6	2	6	5	6	3	2	5	5	Ret	477
5	(United Kingdom) James Abbott	8	7	11	9	9	7	10	9	8	5	7	7	10	8	11	6	7	8	7	9	9	7	4	9	7	7	7	**3**	4	3	476
6	(South Africa) Jayde Kruger										4	2	3	Ret	4	6	3	2	6	6	5	3	5	2	2	3	1	3	4	2	4	471
7	(Argentina) Pablo Maranzana	6	3	4	6	4	3	7	5	7	3	5	9	2	3	3	5	4	9	2	**2**	2										448
8	(United States) Camren Kaminsky	2	Ret	3	10	8	Ret	9	4	Ret	7	3	5	5	9	9	Ret	6	Ret	Ret	8	7	6	5	6	1	5	5	8	7	Ret	421
9	(United Kingdom) Andy Richardson	10	8	12	Ret	Ret	10	2	11	3	6	Ret	4	7	Ret	7	7	9	5	Ret	7	8	8	9	8	Ret	9	Ret	7	6	2	377
10	(United Kingdom) George Blundell	3	4	7	8	6	8	11	6	Ret																						136
11	(Finland) Lassi Halminen	4	Ret	5	3	5	Ret	Ret	DNS	Ret				4	5	Ret																128
12	(United Kingdom) Luke Williams	5	Ret	2	7	NC	4	5	7	DNS																						122
13	(United Kingdom) Luke Reade																						11	10	12	9	8	8	10	10	8	110
14	(United Kingdom) Connor Mills																DNS	10	Ret				10	7	10	10	Ret	9	NC	9	7	106
15	(United Kingdom) Fred Martin-Dye				11	Ret	9	6	8	6																						70
16	(United Kingdom) Max Marshall																									**4**	**Ret**	**Ret**	6	8	Ret	55
17	(United Kingdom) Scott Malvern	Ret	2	8																												45
18	(United Kingdom) Jack Dex																						9	8	11							36
19	(United Kingdom) Neil Winn	11	Ret	10																												22
20	(United Kingdom) David Wagner							12	Ret	Ret																						6
Guest drivers ineligible for points
	(United Kingdom) Sam MacLeod													9	Ret	4																0
	(United Kingdom) Ben Anderson	7	5	6																												0
	(Macau) Wing Chung Chang																						Ret	Ret	7	6	6	6				0
	(United Kingdom) Simon Rudd																												9	**Ret**	6	0
	(Kuwait) Zaid Ashkanani																8	8	7													0
	(Hong Kong) Shaun Thong													11	Ret	8																0
	(United Kingdom) Rob Shield													12	10	Ret																0
Pos	Driver	BHI			DON			THR			OUL			CRO			SNE			KNO			ROC			SIL			BHGP			Points

Colour	Result
Gold	Winner
Silver	Second place
Bronze	Third place
Green	Points classification
Blue	Non-points classification
Blue	Non-classified finish (NC)
Purple	Retired, not classified (Ret)
Red	Did not qualify (DNQ)
Red	Did not pre-qualify (DNPQ)
Black	Disqualified (DSQ)
White	Did not start (DNS)
White	Withdrew (WD)
White	Race cancelled (C)
Blank	Did not practice (DNP)
Blank	Did not arrive (DNA)
Blank	Excluded (EX)

**Bold** – Pole
Italics – Fastest Lap

=== Constructors Cup ===
(key)

Pos	Constructor	BHI			DON			THR			OUL			CRO			SNE			KNO			ROC			SIL	BHGP	Points
1	(France) Mygale	1	1	1	1	1	1	1	1	1	1	1	1	1	1	1	1	1	1	1	1	1	1	1	1			192
2	(United Kingdom) Sinter	8	7	11	9	9	7	6	8	6				12	10	Ret	8	8	7				8	9	11			84
Pos	Constructor	BHI			DON			THR			OUL			CRO			SNE			KNO			ROC			SIL	BHGP	Points

=== Nations Cup ===
(key)

Pos	Nation	BHI			DON			THR			OUL			CRO			SNE			KNO			ROC			SIL	BHGP	Points
1	Argentina	6	3	4	4	2	2	4	2	2	3	5	8	2	3	3	4	4	4	2	2	2	4	3	4			684
2	United States	2	Ret	3	10	8	Ret	9	4	Ret	7	3	5	5	9	9	Ret	6	Ret	Ret	8	7	6	5	6			454
3	South Africa										4	2	3	Ret	4	6	3	2	6	6	5	3	5	2	2			396
4	Finland	4	Ret	5	3	5	Ret	Ret	DNS	Ret				4	5	Ret												159
Guest nations ineligible for points
	Kuwait																8	8	7									0
	Macau																						Ret	Ret	7			0
	Hong Kong													11	Ret	8												0
Pos	Nation	BHI			DON			THR			OUL			CRO			SNE			KNO			ROC			SIL	BHGP	Points
