= Baku World Challenge =

International motorsport competition in Baku, Azerbaijan

Blancpain Sprint Series
- First race: 2012
- Last race: 2014
- Laps: ca. 30
- Duration: 1 hour
- Previous names: City Challenge Baku (2012); Baku World Challenge (2013–2014)
- Most wins (driver): (Belgium) Laurens Vanthoor (2)
- Most wins (team): (Belgium) Belgian Audi Club Team WRT (2)
- Most wins (manufacturer): (Germany) Audi (2)

The Baku World Challenge was an international motorsport competition in Baku, Azerbaijan, held on a temporary street circuit on closed public roads.

Baku World Challenge
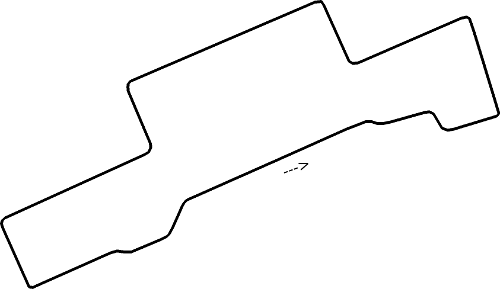
- Original Circuit (2012)
- Location: Baku, Azerbaijan
- Coordinates: 40°23′43″N 49°52′56″E
- Broke ground: October 12, 2012; 13 years ago
- Opened: October 25, 2012; 13 years ago
- Closed: November 2, 2014; 11 years ago
- Former names: City Challenge Baku (2012)
- Major events: Blancpain Sprint Series (2013–2014)

Street Circuit (2014)
- Surface: Asphalt
- Length: 3.890 km (2.417 mi)
- Turns: 13
- Race lap record: 1:29.488 ( (Belgium) Laurens Vanthoor, Audi R8 LMS ultra, 2014, GT3)

Street Circuit (2013)
- Surface: Asphalt
- Length: 4.380 km (2.722 mi)
- Turns: 13
- Race lap record: 1:42.583 ( (Germany) René Rast, Audi R8 LMS ultra, 2013, GT3)

Original Circuit (2012)
- Surface: Asphalt
- Length: 2.144 km (1.332 mi)
- Turns: 14
- Race lap record: 1:03.939 ( (United Kingdom) Sean Edwards, Porsche 911 GT3 R, 2012, GT3)

== History ==
=== 2012 ===
In 2012 (October 28), the City Challenge GmbH organized a stand-alone event for GT3-spec cars in Baku. It was called City Challenge Baku. The races were held on a 2.144 km (1.332 mi) street circuit around the Government House. Gymkhana drifters and entertainment activities were the supporting program. According to the promoter, the event had 42,000 visitors.

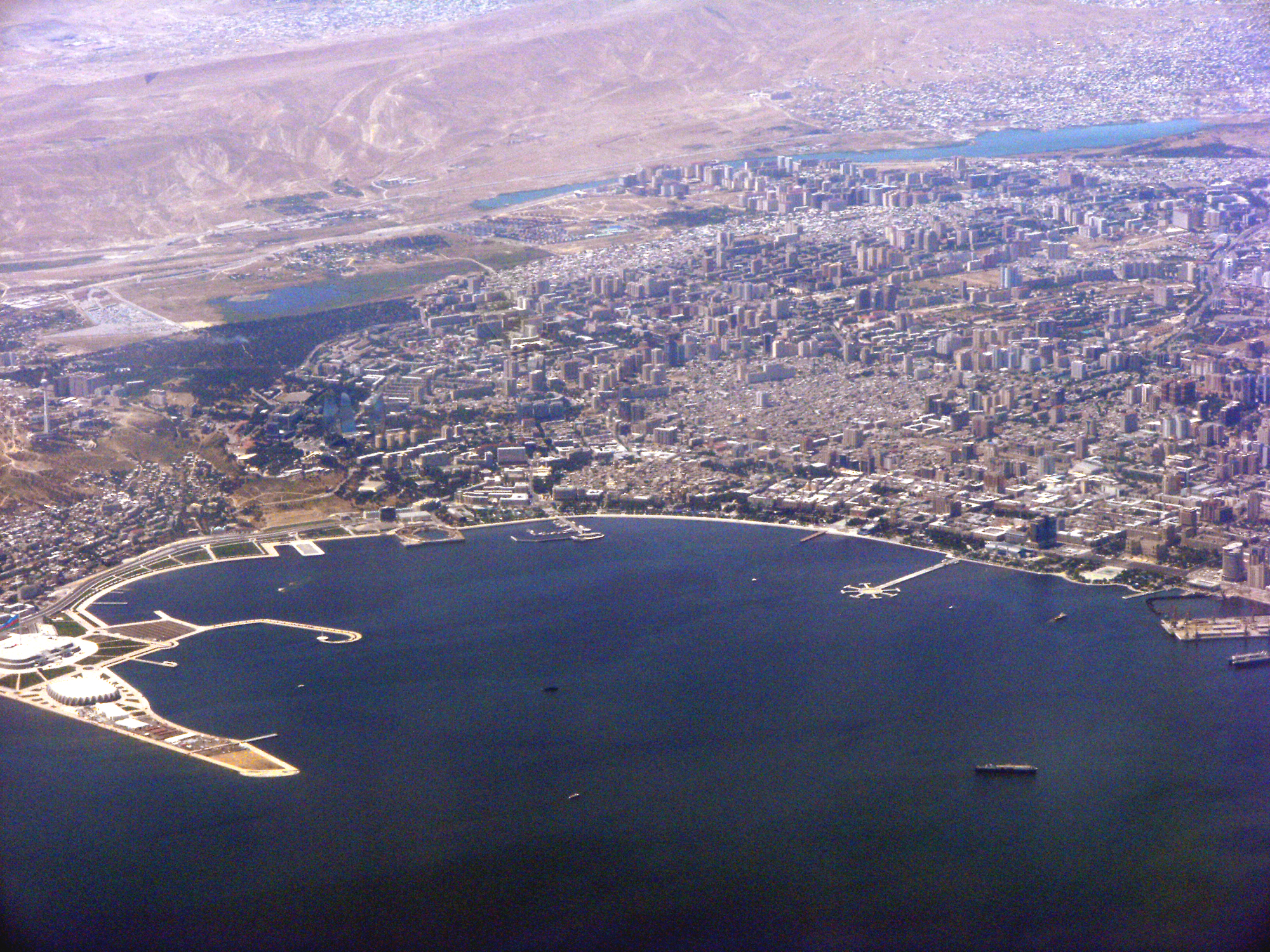
The street circuit in aerial view from left bottom

=== 2013 ===
In 2013, the finale of the FIA GT Championship was held in Baku as Baku World Challenge. The series used a new street circuit close to the Baku Crystal Hall and the National Flag Square. It had a length of 4.380 km (2.722 mi). The event was organized by Jean-François Chaumont and the former Formula 1 driver Thierry Boutsen.

=== 2014 ===
In 2014, the last race of the Blancpain Sprint Series was held in Baku as Baku World Challenge. The series used a new shortened circuit close to the Baku Crystal Hall and the National Flag Square. The circuit was shortened to 3.890 km (2.417 mi). The event was closed following the announcement that Formula One would hold a street race in Baku from 2016.

== Winners ==
Year	Driver	Constructor	Team
2012	(France) Frédéric Makowiecki (Netherlands) Stef Dusseldorp	McLaren MP4-12C GT3	Hexis Racing
2013	(Monaco) Stéphane Ortelli (Belgium) Laurens Vanthoor	Audi R8 LMS ultra	Belgian Audi Club Team WRT
2014	(Belgium) Laurens Vanthoor (Brazil) César Ramos	Audi R8 LMS ultra	Belgian Audi Club Team WRT

== Lap records ==
The fastest official race lap records at the Baku World Challenge are listed as:

Category	Time	Driver	Vehicle	Event
Street Circuit (2014): 3.890 km (2.417 mi)
GT3	1:29.488	Laurens Vanthoor	Audi R8 LMS ultra	2014 Baku World Challenge
Street Circuit (2013): 4.380 km (2.722 mi)
GT3	1:42.583	René Rast	Audi R8 LMS ultra	2013 Baku World Challenge
Original Circuit (2012): 2.144 km (1.332 mi)
GT3	1:03.939	Sean Edwards	Porsche 911 (997 II) GT3 R	2012 City Challenge Baku
