= 2024 Nürburgring Langstrecken-Serie =

47th season of the German endurance series

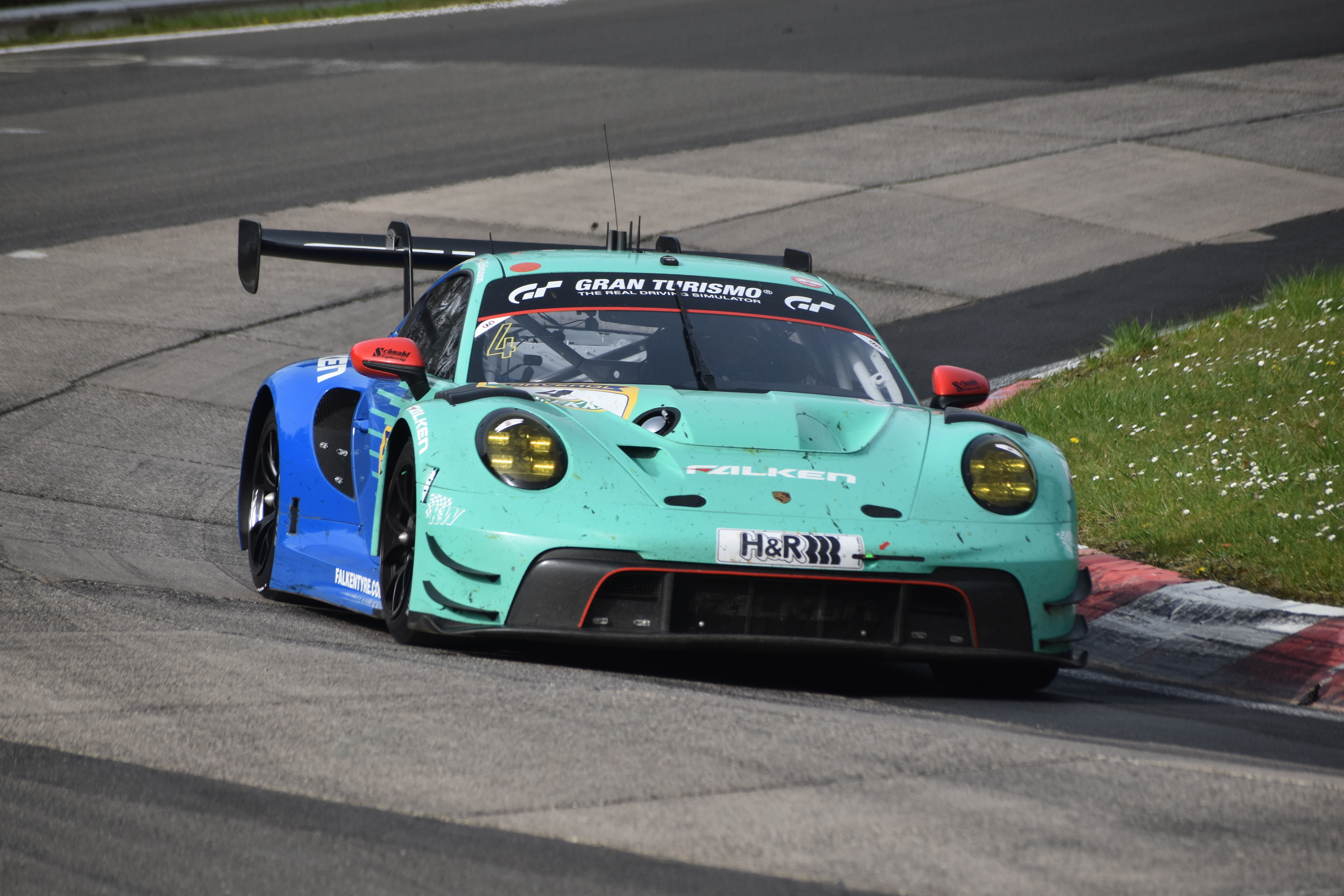
The overall teams' champions, #4 Falken Motorsports and their Porsche 911 GT3 R.

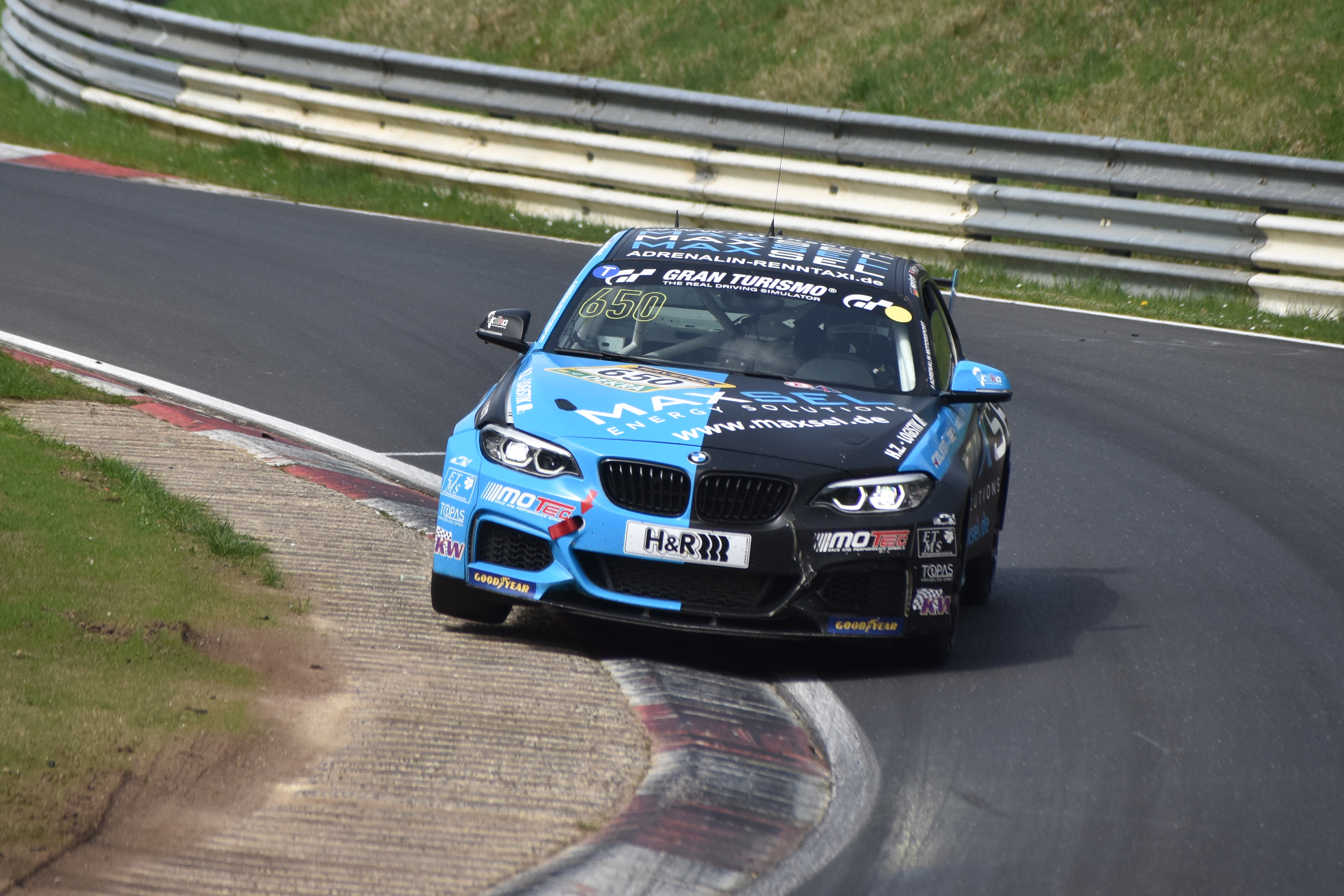
Toby Goodman, Sven Markert, and Ranko Mijatovic won the overall drivers' championship.

The 2024 Nürburgring Langstrecken-Serie is the 47th season of the German endurance series (formerly VLN) run at the Nürburgring Nordschleife, and fifth run as the Nürburgring Langstrecken Serie (NLS). The season will begin on 6 April and end on 16 November.

== Calendar ==
Due to legal dispute with the track owners over race dates, the 2024 season only contains 5 weekends compared to last season's 7 weekends. Additionally, the qualifier races for the 2024 24 Hours of Nürburgring will count for this season's championship.

Rnd.		Race	Length	Circuit	Date
1	NLS1	64. ADAC ACAS Cup	4 hours	(Germany) Nürburgring Nordschleife	6 April
2	NLS2	63. ADAC Reinoldus-Langstreckenrennen	4 hours	(Germany) Nürburgring Nordschleife	7 April
3	24H-Q1	ADAC 24h Nürburgring Qualifiers Rennen 1	4 hours	(Germany) Nürburgring Nordschleife	13 April
4	24H-Q2	ADAC 24h Nürburgring Qualifiers Rennen 2	4 hours	(Germany) Nürburgring Nordschleife	14 April
5	NLS3	69. ADAC Westfalenfahrt	4 hours	(Germany) Nürburgring Nordschleife	22 June
6	NLS4	6h ADAC Ruhr-Pokal-Rennen	6 hours	(Germany) Nürburgring Nordschleife	3 August
7	NLS5	55. Adenauer ADAC Rundstrecken-Trophy	4 hours	(Germany) Nürburgring Nordschleife	19 October
8	NLS6	56. ADAC Barbarossapreis	4 hours	(Germany) Nürburgring Nordschleife	16 November

== Classes ==
Entries are split into multiple different classes. Current classes are:

	Class
NLS specials
SP2	Purpose-built racecars with an engine capacity up to 1700 cc.
SP3	Purpose-built racecars with an engine capacity between 1750 and 2000 cc.
SP4	Purpose-built racecars with an engine capacity between 2001 and 2500 cc.
SP5	Purpose-built racecars with an engine capacity between 2501 and 3000 cc.
SP6	Purpose-built racecars with an engine capacity between 3001 and 3500 cc.
SP7	Purpose-built racecars with an engine capacity between 3501 and 4000 cc.
SP8	Purpose-built racecars with an engine capacity over 4000 cc.
SP9	For FIA-homologated Group GT3 cars. GT3 sub-classes based on driver ranking system maintained by the FIA.
SP9 Pro, SP9 Pro-Am & SP9 Am	For FIA-homologated Group GT3 cars. GT3 sub-classes based on driver ranking system maintained by the FIA.
SP10	For FIA and SRO-homologated Group GT4 cars.
SP11	For FIA and SRO-homologated Group GT2 cars. GT2 sub-classes based on driver ranking system.
SP11 Pro, SP11 Pro-Am & SP11 Am	For FIA and SRO-homologated Group GT2 cars. GT2 sub-classes based on driver ranking system.
SP2T	Purpose-built racecars with a turbocharged-engine capacity between 1350 and 1750 cc.
SP3T	Purpose-built racecars with a turbocharged-engine capacity between 1751 and 2000 cc.
SP4T	Purpose-built racecars with a turbocharged-engine capacity between 2001 and 2600 cc.
SP8T	Purpose-built racecars with a turbocharged-engine capacity between 2601 and 4000 cc.
SP-Pro	Prototype racecars with an engine capacity over 3000 cc.
SP-X	'Special vehicles' which do not fit into any other class.
AT(-G)	Vehicles using alternative fuel sources (e.g. electric, LPG, hydrogen, etc.)
TCR touring cars
TCR	FIA-homologated TCR Touring Cars.
NLS production cars
V3	Production cars with an engine capacity up to 2000 cc.
V4	Production cars with an engine capacity between 2001 and 2500 cc.
V5	Production cars with an engine capacity between 2501 and 3000 cc.
V6	Production cars with an engine capacity between 3001 and 3500 cc.
VT1	Production cars with a turbocharged-engine capacity up to 1600 cc.
VT2	Production cars with a turbocharged-engine capacity between 1601 and 2000 cc.
VT3	Production cars with a turbocharged-engine capacity between 2001 and 3000 cc.
VT Hybrid	Production cars with hybrid power units.
V Elektro	Production cars with electric powertrains.
Porsche Endurance Trophy Nürburgring Class cars Cup classes are for single make identical or near identical specification cars
Cup 2	Porsche 992 GT3 Cup cars using Michelin control tyres.
Cup 3	Porsche Cayman GT4 Trophy cars.
Cup Class cars Cup classes are for single make identical or near identical specification cars
M2 CS	BMW M2 CS cars.
M240i	BMW M240i Racing Cup cars.
Gruppe H historic cars
H2	Pre-2013 production cars and purpose-built racecars with an engine capacity up to 1999 cc.
H4	Pre-2013 production cars and purpose-built racecars with an engine capacity between 2000 and 6250 cc.

== Entry list ==
=== Main classes ===
==== SP9 (Group GT3) ====
Team	Car	No.	Drivers	Class	Rounds
(Germany) Frikadelli Racing Team	Ferrari 296 GT3	1	(Germany) Luca Ludwig	P	3
(Germany) Frikadelli Racing Team	Ferrari 296 GT3	1	(Argentina) Nicolás Varrone	P	3
(Germany) Frikadelli Racing Team	Ferrari 296 GT3	1	(Germany) Daniel Keilwitz	P	4
(Germany) Frikadelli Racing Team	Ferrari 296 GT3	1	(Germany) Felipe Fernández Laser	P	4
(Germany) Falken Motorsports	Porsche 911 GT3 R (992)	3; 33 (Note: Alternate number used during the 24h Nürburgring Qualifiers races.)	(Belgium) Alessio Picariello	P	1–2, 4, 6–7
(Germany) Falken Motorsports	Porsche 911 GT3 R (992)	3; 33	(Austria) Klaus Bachler	P	3–4, 7
(Germany) Falken Motorsports	Porsche 911 GT3 R (992)	3; 33	(Austria) Martin Ragginger	P	1–2
(Germany) Falken Motorsports	Porsche 911 GT3 R (992)	3; 33	(France) Julien Andlauer	P	3, 5
(Germany) Falken Motorsports	Porsche 911 GT3 R (992)	3; 33	(Germany) Sven Müller	P	4–5
(Germany) Falken Motorsports	Porsche 911 GT3 R (992)	3; 33	(United Kingdom) Alex Lynn	P	6
(Germany) Falken Motorsports	Porsche 911 GT3 R (992)	4; 44	(Germany) Tim Heinemann	P	2–3, 5, 7
(Germany) Falken Motorsports	Porsche 911 GT3 R (992)	4; 44	(Sweden) Joel Eriksson	P	1–2, 7
(Germany) Falken Motorsports	Porsche 911 GT3 R (992)	4; 44	(Germany) Nico Menzel	P	1, 4, 6
(Germany) Falken Motorsports	Porsche 911 GT3 R (992)	4; 44	(Austria) Martin Ragginger	P	4–5
(Germany) Falken Motorsports	Porsche 911 GT3 R (992)	4; 44	(Germany) Sven Müller	P	3
(Germany) Falken Motorsports	Porsche 911 GT3 R (992)	4; 44	(Germany) Timo Glock	P	6
(Germany) Mercedes-AMG Team Bilstein by HRT	Mercedes-AMG GT3 Evo	3	(Italy) Michele Beretta	P	3–4
(Germany) Mercedes-AMG Team Bilstein by HRT	Mercedes-AMG GT3 Evo	3	(United Kingdom) Frank Bird	P	3–4
(Germany) Mercedes-AMG Team Bilstein by HRT	Mercedes-AMG GT3 Evo	3	(Germany) Jusuf Owega	P	3–4
(Germany) Mercedes-AMG Team Bilstein by HRT	Mercedes-AMG GT3 Evo	3	(India) Arjun Maini	P	4
(Germany) Mercedes-AMG Team Bilstein by HRT	Mercedes-AMG GT3 Evo	4	(Germany) Maximilian Götz	P	3–4
(Germany) Mercedes-AMG Team Bilstein by HRT	Mercedes-AMG GT3 Evo	4	(Germany) Luca Stolz	P	3–4
(Germany) Mercedes-AMG Team Bilstein by HRT	Mercedes-AMG GT3 Evo	4	(India) Arjun Maini	P	3
(Germany) Mercedes-AMG Team Bilstein by HRT	Mercedes-AMG GT3 Evo	4	(Spain) Daniel Juncadella	P	4
(Germany) Team Advan x HRT	Mercedes-AMG GT3 Evo	6	(Estonia) Ralf Aron	PA	1–4
(Germany) Team Advan x HRT	Mercedes-AMG GT3 Evo	6	(Germany) Dennis Fetzer	PA	1–4
(Germany) Team Advan x HRT	Mercedes-AMG GT3 Evo	6	(Germany) Hubert Haupt	PA	1–4
(Germany) Team Advan x HRT	Mercedes-AMG GT3 Evo	6	(Germany) Jusuf Owega	PA	3–4
(Germany) Team Advan x HRT	Mercedes-AMG GT3 Evo	6	(Germany) Jusuf Owega	P	5–7
(Germany) Team Advan x HRT	Mercedes-AMG GT3 Evo	6	(Germany) Dennis Fetzer	P	6–8
(Germany) Team Advan x HRT	Mercedes-AMG GT3 Evo	6	(India) Arjun Maini	P	5–6
(Germany) Team Advan x HRT	Mercedes-AMG GT3 Evo	6	(Germany) Hubert Haupt	P	5
(Germany) Team Advan x HRT	Mercedes-AMG GT3 Evo	6	(Italy) Michele Beretta	P	7
(Germany) Team Advan x HRT	Mercedes-AMG GT3 Evo	6	(Germany) Finn Wiebelhaus	P	8
(Germany) Team Advan x HRT	Mercedes-AMG GT3 Evo	6	(Germany) Salman Owega	P	8
(Germany) Team Advan x HRT	Mercedes-AMG GT3 Evo	9	(Germany) Salman Owega	P	5–6
(Germany) Team Advan x HRT	Mercedes-AMG GT3 Evo	9	(Germany) David Schumacher	P	5–6
(Germany) Team Advan x HRT	Mercedes-AMG GT3 Evo	9	(Germany) Dennis Fetzer	P	5
(Germany) Team Advan x HRT	Mercedes-AMG GT3 Evo	9	(Germany) Hubert Haupt	P	6
(Germany) Mercedes-AMG Team HRT	Mercedes-AMG GT3 Evo	14	(United Kingdom) Frank Bird	P	1–2
(Germany) Mercedes-AMG Team HRT	Mercedes-AMG GT3 Evo	14	(Spain) Daniel Juncadella	P	1–2
(Germany) Herberth Motorsport	Porsche 911 GT3 R (992)	5	(Germany) Vincent Kolb	P	3–6
(Germany) Herberth Motorsport	Porsche 911 GT3 R (992)	5	(Norway) Dennis Olsen	P	3–4
(Germany) Herberth Motorsport	Porsche 911 GT3 R (992)	5	(Germany) Robert Renauer	P	3–4
(Germany) Herberth Motorsport	Porsche 911 GT3 R (992)	5	(Germany) Frank Stippler	P	5–6
(Austria) Konrad Motorsport	Lamborghini Huracán GT3 Evo	7	(United States) Danny Soufi	PA	1–2
(Austria) Konrad Motorsport	Lamborghini Huracán GT3 Evo	7	(Germany) Torsten Kratz	PA	1–2
(Austria) Konrad Motorsport	Lamborghini Huracán GT3 Evo	7	(Germany) Maximilian Paul	P	3–4
(Austria) Konrad Motorsport	Lamborghini Huracán GT3 Evo	7	(United States) Danny Soufi	P	3–4
(Austria) Konrad Motorsport	Lamborghini Huracán GT3 Evo	7	(Netherlands) Thierry Vermeulen	P	3–4
(Lithuania) Juta Racing	Audi R8 LMS Evo II	8; 71	(Germany) Alexey Veremenko (Note: Veremenko and "Selv" are Russians, but are competing under German license as Russian national emblems were banned by the FIA due to the Russian invasion of Ukraine.)	Am	1–2, 5–8
(Lithuania) Juta Racing	Audi R8 LMS Evo II	8; 71	(Germany) "Selv"	Am	1–2, 5–8
(Lithuania) Juta Racing	Audi R8 LMS Evo II	8; 71	(Germany) Alexey Veremenko	PA (Note: The Juta Racing entry was listed as Pro-Am in 24H Qualifiers but still scored points as Am for NLS classification.)	3–4
(Lithuania) Juta Racing	Audi R8 LMS Evo II	8; 71	(Germany) "Selv"	PA	3–4
(Germany) Mercedes-AMG Team GetSpeed	Mercedes-AMG GT3 Evo	8	(Austria) Lucas Auer	P	3–4
(Germany) Mercedes-AMG Team GetSpeed	Mercedes-AMG GT3 Evo	8	(United Kingdom) Adam Christodoulou	P	3–4
(Germany) Mercedes-AMG Team GetSpeed	Mercedes-AMG GT3 Evo	8	(Canada) Mikaël Grenier	P	3–4
(Germany) Mercedes-AMG Team GetSpeed	Mercedes-AMG GT3 Evo	9	(Switzerland) Philip Ellis	P	3–4
(Germany) Mercedes-AMG Team GetSpeed	Mercedes-AMG GT3 Evo	9	(Canada) Mikaël Grenier	P	3–4
(Germany) Mercedes-AMG Team GetSpeed	Mercedes-AMG GT3 Evo	9	(Germany) Fabian Schiller	P	3–4
(Germany) Mercedes-AMG Team GetSpeed	Mercedes-AMG GT3 Evo	130	(Germany) Maro Engel	P	3–4
(Germany) Mercedes-AMG Team GetSpeed	Mercedes-AMG GT3 Evo	130	(Andorra) Jules Gounon	P	3–4
(Germany) Mercedes-AMG Team GetSpeed	Mercedes-AMG GT3 Evo	130	(United Kingdom) Adam Christodoulou	P	3
(Germany) Schnitzelalm Racing	Mercedes-AMG GT3 Evo	11	(Germany) Jay Mo Härtling	PA	3–4
(Germany) Schnitzelalm Racing	Mercedes-AMG GT3 Evo	11	(Germany) Kenneth Heyer	PA	3–4
(Germany) Schnitzelalm Racing	Mercedes-AMG GT3 Evo	11	(Germany) Marcel Marchewicz	PA	3–4
(Germany) Scherer Sport PHX	Audi R8 LMS Evo II	15	(Germany) Christopher Haase	P	3–4
(Germany) Scherer Sport PHX	Audi R8 LMS Evo II	15	(Germany) Dennis Marschall	P	3–4
(Germany) Scherer Sport PHX	Audi R8 LMS Evo II	15	(Belgium) Frédéric Vervisch	P	3–4
(Germany) Scherer Sport PHX	Audi R8 LMS Evo II	15	(Germany) Frank Stippler	P	7–8
(Germany) Scherer Sport PHX	Audi R8 LMS Evo II	15	(Germany) Nico Bastian	P	7
(Germany) Scherer Sport PHX	Audi R8 LMS Evo II	15	(Germany) Markus Winkelhock	P	8
(Germany) Scherer Sport PHX	Audi R8 LMS Evo II	16	(Germany) Frank Stippler	P	1, 3–4
(Germany) Scherer Sport PHX	Audi R8 LMS Evo II	16	(Switzerland) Ricardo Feller	P	3–4
(Germany) Scherer Sport PHX	Audi R8 LMS Evo II	16	(Germany) Christopher Mies	P	3–4
(Germany) Scherer Sport PHX	Audi R8 LMS Evo II	16	(Germany) Markus Winkelhock	P	1
(Germany) PROsport-Racing	Aston Martin Vantage AMR GT3	17	(Germany) Marek Böckmann	PA	1, 5–7
(Germany) PROsport-Racing	Aston Martin Vantage AMR GT3	17	(Belgium) Maxime Dumarey	PA	1, 5–7
(Germany) PROsport-Racing	Aston Martin Vantage AMR GT3	17	(Belgium) Simon Balcaen	PA	1, 5–6
(Germany) PROsport-Racing	Aston Martin Vantage AMR GT3	17	(Germany) Nico Bastian	P	3–4, 8
(Germany) PROsport-Racing	Aston Martin Vantage AMR GT3	17	(Germany) Marek Böckmann	P	3–4, 8
(Germany) PROsport-Racing	Aston Martin Vantage AMR GT3	17	(Netherlands) Yelmer Buurman	P	3–4
(Germany) PROsport-Racing	Aston Martin Vantage AMR GT3	17	(United Kingdom) Adam Christodoulou	P	8
(Germany) Up2Race	Audi R8 LMS Evo II	20	(Germany) Pierre Lemmerz	Am	8
(Germany) Up2Race	Audi R8 LMS Evo II	20	(France) Philippe Charlaix	Am	8
(Germany) Up2Race	Audi R8 LMS Evo II	20	(Germany) Michel Albers	Am	8
(Germany) Lionspeed GP	Porsche 911 GT3 R (992)	24	(Hong Kong) Antares Au	PA	3–4
(Germany) Lionspeed GP	Porsche 911 GT3 R (992)	24	(Netherlands) Indy Dontje	PA	3–4
(Germany) Lionspeed GP	Porsche 911 GT3 R (992)	24	(Germany) Patrick Kolb	PA	3–4
(Germany) Lionspeed GP	Porsche 911 GT3 R (992)	24	(Switzerland) Patric Niederhauser	PA	3–4
(Germany) Huber Motorsport	Porsche 911 GT3 R (992)	25	(Germany) Thomas Kiefer	PA	6
(Germany) Huber Motorsport	Porsche 911 GT3 R (992)	25	(Germany) Joachim Thyssen	PA	6
(Germany) Huber Motorsport	Porsche 911 GT3 R (992)	25	(Germany) Hans Wehrmann	PA	6
(Germany) Red Bull Team ABT	Lamborghini Huracán GT3 Evo 2	27	(South Africa) Jordan Pepper	P	1–4
(Germany) Red Bull Team ABT	Lamborghini Huracán GT3 Evo 2	27	(South Africa) Kelvin van der Linde	P	1–4
(Germany) Red Bull Team ABT	Lamborghini Huracán GT3 Evo 2	27	(Italy) Marco Mapelli	P	3–4
(Germany) Car Collection Motorsport	Audi R8 LMS Evo II	33	(Switzerland) Alex Fontana	PA	6
(Germany) Car Collection Motorsport	Audi R8 LMS Evo II	33	(Germany) Klaus Koch	PA	6
(Germany) Car Collection Motorsport	Audi R8 LMS Evo II	33	(Germany) Florian Spengler	PA	6
(Germany) Car Collection Motorsport	Audi R8 LMS Evo II	33	(Germany) Johannes Stengel	PA	6
(Germany) Walkenhorst Motorsport	Aston Martin Vantage AMR GT3 Evo	34	(Poland) Jakub Giermaziak	P	3–4
(Germany) Walkenhorst Motorsport	Aston Martin Vantage AMR GT3 Evo	34	(Norway) Christian Krognes	P	3–4
(Germany) Walkenhorst Motorsport	Aston Martin Vantage AMR GT3 Evo	34	(Denmark) Nicki Thiim	P	3–4
(Germany) Walkenhorst Motorsport	Aston Martin Vantage AMR GT3 Evo	34	(United Kingdom) David Pittard	P	3
(Germany) Walkenhorst Motorsport	Aston Martin Vantage AMR GT3 Evo	35	(Germany) Benjamin Mazatis	PA	3–6
(Germany) Walkenhorst Motorsport	Aston Martin Vantage AMR GT3 Evo	35	(Germany) Patrick Assenheimer	PA	3–4
(Germany) Walkenhorst Motorsport	Aston Martin Vantage AMR GT3 Evo	35	(United States) Chandler Hull	PA	3–4
(Germany) Walkenhorst Motorsport	Aston Martin Vantage AMR GT3 Evo	35	(Germany) Mike David Ortmann	PA	3–4
(Germany) Walkenhorst Motorsport	Aston Martin Vantage AMR GT3 Evo	35	(Norway) Anders Buchardt	PA	5–6
(Germany) Walkenhorst Motorsport	Aston Martin Vantage AMR GT3 Evo	35	(Finland) Sami-Matti Trogen	PA	5–6
(Germany) Walkenhorst Motorsport	Aston Martin Vantage AMR GT3 Evo	35	(Germany) Stefan Aust	PA	6
(Germany) Walkenhorst Motorsport	Aston Martin Vantage AMR GT3 Evo	36	(Germany) Christian Bollrath	PA	3–4
(Germany) Walkenhorst Motorsport	Aston Martin Vantage AMR GT3 Evo	36	(Norway) Anders Buchardt	PA	3–4
(Germany) Walkenhorst Motorsport	Aston Martin Vantage AMR GT3 Evo	36	(Germany) Henry Walkenhorst	PA	3–4
(Germany) Walkenhorst Motorsport	Aston Martin Vantage AMR GT3 Evo	36	(Germany) Stefan Aust	PA	4
(Germany) Mercedes-AMG Team Landgraf	Mercedes-AMG GT3 Evo	48	(Austria) Lucas Auer	P	5–6, 8
(Germany) Mercedes-AMG Team Landgraf	Mercedes-AMG GT3 Evo	48	(Estonia) Ralf Aron	P	5–6
(Germany) Mercedes-AMG Team Landgraf	Mercedes-AMG GT3 Evo	48	(Andorra) Jules Gounon	P	6
(Germany) Mercedes-AMG Team Landgraf	Mercedes-AMG GT3 Evo	48	(Canada) Mikaël Grenier	P	8
(Germany) équipe vitesse	Audi R8 LMS Evo II	50	(Germany) Michael Heimrich	Am	1–2, 5–7
(Germany) équipe vitesse	Audi R8 LMS Evo II	50	(Germany) Arno Klasen	Am	1–2, 5–7
(Germany) équipe vitesse	Audi R8 LMS Evo II	50	(Switzerland) Lorenzo Rocco	Am	1–2, 5–7
(Germany) équipe vitesse	Audi R8 LMS Evo II	50	(Germany) Michael Heimrich	PA (Note: No. 50 équipe vitesse entry was listed as Pro-Am in 24H Qualifiers but still scored points as Am for NLS classification.)	3–4, 8
(Germany) équipe vitesse	Audi R8 LMS Evo II	50	(Germany) Arno Klasen	PA	3–4, 8
(Germany) équipe vitesse	Audi R8 LMS Evo II	50	(Germany) Sascha Steinhardt	PA	8
(Italy) Dinamic GT	Porsche 911 GT3 R (992)	54	(Germany) Marvin Dienst	P	3–4
(Italy) Dinamic GT	Porsche 911 GT3 R (992)	54	(Denmark) Bastian Buus	P	4, 6
(Italy) Dinamic GT	Porsche 911 GT3 R (992)	54	(Belgium) Adrien De Leener	P	6–7
(Italy) Dinamic GT	Porsche 911 GT3 R (992)	54	(Germany) Marco Holzer	P	3
(Italy) Dinamic GT	Porsche 911 GT3 R (992)	54	(Austria) Marco Seefried	P	4
(Italy) Dinamic GT	Porsche 911 GT3 R (992)	54	(France) Mathieu Jaminet	P	7
(Germany) Dörr Motorsport	Aston Martin Vantage AMR GT3	69	(Germany) Ben Dörr	P	1
(Germany) Dörr Motorsport	Aston Martin Vantage AMR GT3	69	(Germany) Phil Dörr	P	1
(Germany) Dörr Motorsport	Aston Martin Vantage AMR GT3	69	(United Kingdom) Darren Turner	P	1
(Germany) Dörr Motorsport	McLaren 720S GT3 Evo	69	(Germany) Ben Dörr	P	8
(Germany) Dörr Motorsport	McLaren 720S GT3 Evo	69	(Germany) Marvin Kirchhöfer	P	8
(Germany) BMW M Team RMG	BMW M4 GT3	72	(United Kingdom) Dan Harper	P	3–4
(Germany) BMW M Team RMG	BMW M4 GT3	72	(Germany) Max Hesse	P	3–4
(Germany) BMW M Team RMG	BMW M4 GT3	72	(Belgium) Charles Weerts	P	3–4
(Germany) Rowe Racing	BMW M4 GT3	98	(Switzerland) Raffaele Marciello	P	3–4
(Germany) Rowe Racing	BMW M4 GT3	98	(Belgium) Maxime Martin	P	3–4
(Germany) Rowe Racing	BMW M4 GT3	98	(Germany) Marco Wittmann	P	3–4
(Germany) Rowe Racing	BMW M4 GT3	99	(Brazil) Augusto Farfus	P	3–4
(Germany) Rowe Racing	BMW M4 GT3	99	(South Africa) Sheldon van der Linde	P	3–4
(Germany) Rowe Racing	BMW M4 GT3	99	(Belgium) Dries Vanthoor	P	3–4
(Thailand) Renazzo Motor with mcchip-dkr	Lamborghini Huracán GT3 Evo 2	786	(Germany) Christoph Breuer	Am	1–2
(Thailand) Renazzo Motor with mcchip-dkr	Lamborghini Huracán GT3 Evo 2	786	(Thailand) Kiki Sak Nana	Am	1–2
(Thailand) Renazzo Motor with mcchip-dkr	Lamborghini Huracán GT3 Evo 2	786	(Germany) Danny Kubasik / "Dieter Schmidtmann"	Am	1–2
(Thailand) Renazzo Motor with mcchip-dkr	Lamborghini Huracán GT3 Evo 2	786	(Germany) Luca Engstler	PA	5
(Thailand) Renazzo Motor with mcchip-dkr	Lamborghini Huracán GT3 Evo 2	786	(Germany) Danny Kubasik / "Dieter Schmidtmann"	PA	5
(Germany) Manthey Racing EMA	Porsche 911 GT3 R (992)	911	(Turkey) Ayhancan Güven	P	3–4, 6, 8
(Germany) Manthey Racing EMA	Porsche 911 GT3 R (992)	911	(Belgium) Laurens Vanthoor	P	1–2, 6
(Germany) Manthey Racing EMA	Porsche 911 GT3 R (992)	911	(Austria) Thomas Preining	P	3–4, 6
(Germany) Manthey Racing EMA	Porsche 911 GT3 R (992)	911	(France) Kévin Estre	P	1–2
(Germany) Manthey Racing EMA	Porsche 911 GT3 R (992)	911	(Netherlands) Morris Schuring	P	8

Icon	Class
P	Pro Cup
PA	Pro-Am Cup
Am	Am Cup

==== SP10 (Group GT4) ====
Team	Car	No.	Drivers	Rounds
(Switzerland) NEF Motorsport AG	Porsche 718 Cayman GT4 RS Clubsport	163	(Switzerland) Philipp Hagnauer	3–4, 6
(Switzerland) NEF Motorsport AG	Porsche 718 Cayman GT4 RS Clubsport	163	(Switzerland) Alexander Walker	3–4, 6
(Germany) AVIA W&S Motorsport	Porsche 718 Cayman GT4 RS Clubsport	164	(Germany) Stephan Brodmerkel	1, 3–7
(Germany) AVIA W&S Motorsport	Porsche 718 Cayman GT4 RS Clubsport	164	(Germany) Jürgen Vöhringer	1, 3–7
(Germany) AVIA W&S Motorsport	Porsche 718 Cayman GT4 RS Clubsport	164	(Germany) Hendrik Still	3–6
(Germany) AVIA W&S Motorsport	Porsche 718 Cayman GT4 RS Clubsport	164	(Germany) Phil Hill	1, 7
(Germany) AVIA W&S Motorsport	Porsche 718 Cayman GT4 RS Clubsport	164	(Germany) Finn Zulauf	6
(Germany) Black Falcon	BMW M4 GT4 Gen II	166	(United States) Ryan Harrison	3–4
(Germany) Black Falcon	BMW M4 GT4 Gen II	166	(United States) Mike Skeen	3–4
(Germany) Black Falcon	BMW M4 GT4 Gen II	166	(Romania) Alexandru Vasilescu	3–4
(Germany) Black Falcon	BMW M4 GT4 Gen II	166	(United States) William Wachs	3–4
(Germany) Dörr Motorsport	Aston Martin Vantage AMR GT4	169	(Norway) Oskar Sandberg	1–2, 5–8
(Germany) Dörr Motorsport	Aston Martin Vantage AMR GT4	169	(Germany) Nick Wüstenhagen	1–2, 5–8
(Germany) Dörr Motorsport	Aston Martin Vantage AMR GT4	169	(Germany) Aaron Wenisch	1–2, 5, 7–8
(Germany) Dörr Motorsport	Aston Martin Vantage AMR GT4	169	(Germany) Phil Dörr	6
(Germany) Dörr Motorsport	Aston Martin Vantage AMR GT4	179	(Norway) Niklas Eker Abrahamsen	5–7
(Germany) Dörr Motorsport	Aston Martin Vantage AMR GT4	179	(Germany) Phil Dörr	5, 7–8
(Germany) Dörr Motorsport	Aston Martin Vantage AMR GT4	179	(Germany) Olaf Hoppelshäuser	5–6
(Germany) Dörr Motorsport	Aston Martin Vantage AMR GT4	179	(Belgium) Aris Balanian	6
(Germany) Dörr Motorsport	Aston Martin Vantage AMR GT4	179	(Germany) Stefan Gaukler	8
(Germany) Dörr Motorsport	Aston Martin Vantage AMR GT4	179	(Germany) "Montana"	8
(Germany) Toyo Tires with Ring Racing	Toyota GR Supra GT4	170	(Germany) Andreas Gülden	1–7
(Germany) Toyo Tires with Ring Racing	Toyota GR Supra GT4	170	(Germany) Marc Hennerici	1–7
(Germany) Toyo Tires with Ring Racing	Toyota GR Supra GT4	170	(Germany) Tim Sandtler	1–7
(Germany) Toyo Tires with Ring Racing	Toyota GR Supra GT4	170	(Germany) Uwe Kleen	4
(Germany) Toyo Tires with Ring Racing	Toyota GR Supra GT4	171	(Japan) Takayuki Kinoshita	1–8
(Germany) Toyo Tires with Ring Racing	Toyota GR Supra GT4	171	(Germany) Heiko Tönges	1–8
(Germany) Toyo Tires with Ring Racing	Toyota GR Supra GT4	171	(Germany) Michael Tischner	1–6
(Germany) Toyo Tires with Ring Racing	Toyota GR Supra GT4	171	(Germany) Tim Sandtler	8
(Japan) Toyota Gazoo Racing	Toyota GR Supra GT4 Evo	172	(Japan) Kamui Kobayashi	1–2
(Japan) Toyota Gazoo Racing	Toyota GR Supra GT4 Evo	172	(Japan) Kazuto Kotaka	1–2
(Japan) Toyota Gazoo Racing	Toyota GR Supra GT4 Evo	173	(Japan) Seita Nonaka	1–2
(Japan) Toyota Gazoo Racing	Toyota GR Supra GT4 Evo	173	(Japan) Hibiki Taira	1–2
(Germany) PROsport-Racing	Aston Martin Vantage AMR GT4	175	(Switzerland) Jasmin Preisig	1, 3–4
(Germany) PROsport-Racing	Aston Martin Vantage AMR GT4	175	(Belgium) Marnix Hommerson	5, 7
(Germany) PROsport-Racing	Aston Martin Vantage AMR GT4	175	(France) Célia Martin	1
(Germany) PROsport-Racing	Aston Martin Vantage AMR GT4	175	(Germany) Reinhold Renger	3
(Germany) PROsport-Racing	Aston Martin Vantage AMR GT4	175	(Germany) Jörg Viebahn	4
(Germany) PROsport-Racing	Aston Martin Vantage AMR GT4	175	(Canada) Damon Surzyshyn	5
(Germany) PROsport-Racing	Aston Martin Vantage AMR GT4	176	(Switzerland) Jacques Castelein	1
(Germany) PROsport-Racing	Aston Martin Vantage AMR GT4	176	(Belgium) Guido Dumarey	1
(Germany) PROsport-Racing	Aston Martin Vantage AMR GT4	176	(France) Célia Martin	2
(Germany) PROsport-Racing	Aston Martin Vantage AMR GT4	176	(Switzerland) Jasmin Preisig	2
(Germany) PROsport-Racing	Aston Martin Vantage AMR GT4	176	(Belgium) Alexander Hommerson	5
(Germany) PROsport-Racing	Aston Martin Vantage AMR GT4	176	(United Kingdom) Harry Rice	5
(Germany) PROsport-Racing	Aston Martin Vantage AMR GT4	177	(Belgium) Mathieu Castelein	1–2
(Germany) PROsport-Racing	Aston Martin Vantage AMR GT4	177	(France) Steven Palette	1
(Germany) Fastlane Racing	Aston Martin Vantage AMR GT4	177	(United Kingdom) Harry Rice	3–4
(Germany) Fastlane Racing	Aston Martin Vantage AMR GT4	177	(China) Ye Pengcheng	3–4
(Germany) Fastlane Racing	Aston Martin Vantage AMR GT4	177	(Sweden) Eric Ullström	4
(Germany) SRS Team Sorg Rennsport	Porsche 718 Cayman GT4 RS Clubsport	181	(Germany) Richard Jodexnis	1–8
(Germany) SRS Team Sorg Rennsport	Porsche 718 Cayman GT4 RS Clubsport	181	(Germany) Bernhard Wagner	1–4, 6
(Germany) SRS Team Sorg Rennsport	Porsche 718 Cayman GT4 RS Clubsport	181	(Germany) Christoph Krombach	3–6
(Germany) SRS Team Sorg Rennsport	Porsche 718 Cayman GT4 RS Clubsport	181	(Germany) Stefan Beyer	1–2, 7
(Germany) SRS Team Sorg Rennsport	Porsche 718 Cayman GT4 RS Clubsport	181	(Germany) Jan-Niklas Stieler	7–8
(Germany) SRS Team Sorg Rennsport	Porsche 718 Cayman GT4 RS Clubsport	181	(Germany) Emin Akata	5
(Germany) SRS Team Sorg Rennsport	Porsche 718 Cayman GT4 RS Clubsport	181	(Germany) Dmytro Ryzhak	6
(Germany) SRS Team Sorg Rennsport	Porsche 718 Cayman GT4 RS Clubsport	181	(Germany) Heiko Eichenberg	8
(Germany) Schmickler Performance powered by Ravenol	Porsche 718 Cayman GT4 RS Clubsport	184; 165	(Switzerland) Ivan Jacoma	1–5, 7–8
(Germany) Schmickler Performance powered by Ravenol	Porsche 718 Cayman GT4 RS Clubsport	184; 165	(Germany) Claudius Karch	1–5, 7–8
(Germany) Schmickler Performance powered by Ravenol	Porsche 718 Cayman GT4 RS Clubsport	184; 165	(Germany) Kai Riemer	1–5, 7–8
(Germany) Schmickler Performance powered by Ravenol	Porsche 718 Cayman GT4 RS Clubsport	184; 165	(Germany) Achim Wawer	1–4, 7
(Germany) Teichmann Racing	Toyota GR Supra GT4 Evo	185	(Germany) Michael Mönch	7
(Germany) Teichmann Racing	Toyota GR Supra GT4 Evo	185	(Germany) Andreas Tasche	7
(Germany) Teichmann Racing	Toyota GR Supra GT4 Evo	185	(Austria) Karl-Heinz Teichmann	7
(Germany) FK Performance Motorsport	BMW M4 GT4	187	(South Africa) Leyton Fourie	6
(Germany) FK Performance Motorsport	BMW M4 GT4	187	(United Kingdom) "Joe"	6
(Germany) Walkenhorst Racing	BMW M4 GT4 Gen II	191	(Belgium) Aris Balanian	1–5
(Germany) Walkenhorst Racing	BMW M4 GT4 Gen II	191	(Germany) Tobias Wahl	1–4, 6
(Germany) Walkenhorst Racing	BMW M4 GT4 Gen II	191	(Germany) Bennet Ehrl	3–4, 7
(Germany) Walkenhorst Racing	BMW M4 GT4 Gen II	191	(Germany) Florian Weber	5–6
(Germany) Walkenhorst Racing	BMW M4 GT4 Gen II	191	(United Kingdom) Joseph Warhurst	5

==== SP11 (Group GT2) ====
Team	Car	No.	Drivers	Class	Rounds
(Germany) Dörr Motorsport	KTM X-Bow GT2	55	(Germany) Ben Dörr	PA	3–4
(Germany) Dörr Motorsport	KTM X-Bow GT2	55	(Germany) Christian Gebhardt	PA	3–4
(Germany) Dörr Motorsport	KTM X-Bow GT2	55	(Germany) Max Hofer	PA	3–4
(Germany) Dörr Motorsport	KTM X-Bow GT2	55	(Germany) Fabian Vettel	PA	3–4

Icon	Class
P	Pro Cup
PA	Pro-Am Cup
Am	Am Cup

==== Porsche Endurance Trophy Nürburgring ====
Team	Car	No.	Drivers	Class	Rounds
CUP2
(Germany) Max Kruse Racing	Porsche 992 GT3 Cup	100	(Germany) Benjamin Leuchter	P	1–2
(Germany) Max Kruse Racing	Porsche 992 GT3 Cup	100	(Germany) Nicholas Otto	P	1–2
(Germany) Max Kruse Racing	Porsche 992 GT3 Cup	105	(Germany) Dominik Fugel	G	5–6
(Germany) Max Kruse Racing	Porsche 992 GT3 Cup	105	(Germany) Marcel Fugel	G	5–6
(Germany) Max Kruse Racing	Porsche 992 GT3 Cup	105	(Germany) Nicholas Otto	G	5
(Germany) Max Kruse Racing	Porsche 992 GT3 Cup	127	(Netherlands) Tom Coronel	P	2–4
(Germany) Max Kruse Racing	Porsche 992 GT3 Cup	127	(Portugal) Tiago Monteiro	P	2–4
(Germany) Max Kruse Racing	Porsche 992 GT3 Cup	127	(Netherlands) Jan Jaap van Roon	P	2–4
(Germany) Max Kruse Racing	Porsche 992 GT3 Cup	127	(Netherlands) Paul Meijer	P	4
(Germany) Max Kruse Racing	Porsche 992 GT3 Cup	127	(Netherlands) Tom Coronel	Am	6–7
(Germany) Max Kruse Racing	Porsche 992 GT3 Cup	127	(Netherlands) Jan Jaap van Roon	Am	6–7
(Germany) RPM Racing	Porsche 992 GT3 Cup	101	(Sweden) Niclas Jönsson	G	7
(Germany) RPM Racing	Porsche 992 GT3 Cup	101	(United States) Tracy Krohn	G	7
(Germany) Black Falcon	Porsche 992 GT3 Cup	103	(Turkey) Mustafa Mehmet Kaya	Am	1–7
(Germany) Black Falcon	Porsche 992 GT3 Cup	103	(Germany) Mike Stursberg	Am	1–7
(Germany) Black Falcon	Porsche 992 GT3 Cup	103	(Switzerland) Gabriele Piana	Am	3–6
(Germany) Black Falcon	Porsche 992 GT3 Cup	103	(Germany) Tobias Müller	Am	1–2
(Germany) Black Falcon	Porsche 992 GT3 Cup	103	(United Kingdom) Adam Christodoulou	Am	7
(Germany) Black Falcon	Porsche 992 GT3 Cup	103	(Luxembourg) Steve Jans	P	8
(Germany) Black Falcon	Porsche 992 GT3 Cup	103	(Germany) Tobias Müller	P	8
(Germany) Black Falcon	Porsche 992 GT3 Cup	103	(Germany) Noah Nagelsdiek	P	8
(Germany) Black Falcon	Porsche 992 GT3 Cup	104	(Netherlands) Morris Schuring	P	3–4
(Germany) Black Falcon	Porsche 992 GT3 Cup	104	(Romania) Alexandru Vasilescu	P	3–4
(Germany) Black Falcon Team 48 LOSCH	Porsche 992 GT3 Cup	148	(Germany) Tobias Müller	P	1–7
(Germany) Black Falcon Team 48 LOSCH	Porsche 992 GT3 Cup	148	(Luxembourg) Steve Jans	P	1–6
(Germany) Black Falcon Team 48 LOSCH	Porsche 992 GT3 Cup	148	(Germany) Noah Nagelsdiek	P	1–4, 7
(Germany) Black Falcon Team 48 LOSCH	Porsche 992 GT3 Cup	148	(Switzerland) Gabriele Piana	P	6
(Germany) pb-performance	Porsche 992 GT3 Cup	106	(Germany) Ralf-Peter Bonk	AG	3–4, 6
(Germany) pb-performance	Porsche 992 GT3 Cup	106	(Netherlands) Marco van Ramshorst	AG	3–4, 6
(Germany) KKrämer Racing	Porsche 992 GT3 Cup	112	(Germany) Karsten Krämer	AG	1–8
(Germany) KKrämer Racing	Porsche 992 GT3 Cup	112	(Germany) Fidel Leib Jun.	AG	1–8
(Germany) KKrämer Racing	Porsche 992 GT3 Cup	112	(Germany) Jan-Erik Slooten	AG	3–4
(Germany) KKrämer Racing	Porsche 992 GT3 Cup	112	(Germany) Christopher Brück	AG	5
(Germany) KKrämer Racing	Porsche 992 GT3 Cup	112	(Germany) Hendrik Still	AG	6
(Germany) KKrämer Racing	Porsche 992 GT3 Cup	112	(Poland) Patryk Krupinski	AG	7
(Germany) KKrämer Racing	Porsche 992 GT3 Cup	121	(Germany) Christopher Brück	P	1–8
(Germany) KKrämer Racing	Porsche 992 GT3 Cup	121	(Germany) Michele Di Martino	P	1–8
(Germany) Team Cameron	Porsche 992 GT3 Cup	113	(Germany) Bill Cameron	AG	5–7
(Germany) Team Cameron	Porsche 992 GT3 Cup	113	(United Kingdom) Jim Cameron	AG	5–7
(Germany) Scherer Sport PHX	Porsche 992 GT3 Cup	116	(Netherlands) Jos Menten	P	5, 7–8
(Germany) Scherer Sport PHX	Porsche 992 GT3 Cup	116	(Luxembourg) Carlos Rivas	P	7–8
(Germany) Scherer Sport PHX	Porsche 992 GT3 Cup	116	(Germany) Hendrik von Danwitz	P	5
(Germany) Halder Motorsport	Porsche 992 GT3 Cup	117	(Germany) Michelle Halder	P	1–2
(Germany) Halder Motorsport	Porsche 992 GT3 Cup	117	(Germany) Mike Halder	P	1–2
(Germany) Clickversicherungs Team	Porsche 992 GT3 Cup	119	(Germany) Robin Chrzanowski	Am	1–2, 6–7
(Germany) Clickversicherungs Team	Porsche 992 GT3 Cup	119	(Germany) Kersten Jodexnis	Am	1–2, 6–7
(Germany) Clickversicherungs Team	Porsche 992 GT3 Cup	119	(New Zealand) Peter Scharmach	Am	6–7
(Germany) Clickversicherungs Team	Porsche 992 GT3 Cup	119	(Germany) Nick Salewsky	Am	6
(Germany) Clickversicherungs Team	Porsche 992 GT3 Cup	119	(Germany) Robin Chrzanowski	P	3–4
(Germany) Clickversicherungs Team	Porsche 992 GT3 Cup	119	(Germany) Kersten Jodexnis	P	3–4
(Germany) Clickversicherungs Team	Porsche 992 GT3 Cup	119	(Germany) Nick Salewsky	P	3–4
(Germany) AVIA W&S Motorsport	Porsche 992 GT3 Cup	120	(Germany) Daniel Blickle	P	1–8
(Germany) AVIA W&S Motorsport	Porsche 992 GT3 Cup	120	(Germany) David Jahn	P	1–8
(Germany) AVIA W&S Motorsport	Porsche 992 GT3 Cup	120	(Germany) Tim Scheerbarth	P	1–8
(Belgium) Mühlner Motorsport	Porsche 992 GT3 Cup	122	(Germany) Ben Bünnagel	P	1–8
(Belgium) Mühlner Motorsport	Porsche 992 GT3 Cup	122	(Germany) Moritz Kranz	P	1–7
(Belgium) Mühlner Motorsport	Porsche 992 GT3 Cup	122	(United Kingdom) Alex Brundle	P	1–2, 6, 8
(Belgium) Mühlner Motorsport	Porsche 992 GT3 Cup	122	(Germany) Arne Hoffmeister	P	3–4
(Belgium) Mühlner Motorsport	Porsche 992 GT3 Cup	122	(France) Leo Messenger	P	6
(Belgium) Mühlner Motorsport	Porsche 992 GT3 Cup	123	(Germany) Marcel Hoppe	AG	1–4
(Belgium) Mühlner Motorsport	Porsche 992 GT3 Cup	123	(Germany) Tobias Vazquez-Garcia	AG	1–4
(Belgium) Mühlner Motorsport	Porsche 992 GT3 Cup	123	(United States) Peter Ludwig	AG	1–2
(Belgium) Mühlner Motorsport	Porsche 992 GT3 Cup	123	(Germany) Michael Rebhan	AG	4
(Belgium) Mühlner Motorsport	Porsche 992 GT3 Cup	123	(Germany) Marcel Hoppe	Am	5–6
(Belgium) Mühlner Motorsport	Porsche 992 GT3 Cup	123	(Germany) Tobias Vazquez-Garcia	Am	5–6
(Belgium) Mühlner Motorsport	Porsche 992 GT3 Cup	123	(France) Leo Messenger	Am	6
(Belgium) Mühlner Motorsport	Porsche 992 GT3 Cup	123	(Finland) Philip Miemois	Am	6
(Belgium) Mühlner Motorsport	Porsche 992 GT3 Cup	123	(Germany) Marcel Hoppe	P	7–8
(Belgium) Mühlner Motorsport	Porsche 992 GT3 Cup	123	(Germany) Tobias Vazquez-Garcia	P	7–8
(Belgium) Mühlner Motorsport	Porsche 992 GT3 Cup	123	(Germany) Arne Hoffmeister	P	7–8
(Belgium) Mühlner Motorsport	Porsche 992 GT3 Cup	124	(Germany) Peter Terting	P	1–6
(Belgium) Mühlner Motorsport	Porsche 992 GT3 Cup	124	(Germany) Moritz Kranz	P	1–4
(Belgium) Mühlner Motorsport	Porsche 992 GT3 Cup	124	(Estonia) Martin Rump	P	6–8
(Belgium) Mühlner Motorsport	Porsche 992 GT3 Cup	124	(Germany) Arne Hoffmeister	P	5–6
(Belgium) Mühlner Motorsport	Porsche 992 GT3 Cup	124	(France) Leo Messenger	P	7–8
(Germany) Huber Motorsport	Porsche 992 GT3 Cup	125	(Germany) Thomas Kiefer	AG	3–4
(Germany) Huber Motorsport	Porsche 992 GT3 Cup	125	(Germany) Hans Wehrmann	AG	3–4
(Germany) Huber Motorsport	Porsche 992 GT3 Cup	125	(Germany) Hans Wehrmann	G	5, 7
(Germany) Huber Motorsport	Porsche 992 GT3 Cup	125	(Germany) Thomas Kiefer	G	5
(Germany) Huber Motorsport	Porsche 992 GT3 Cup	125	(Germany) Joachim Thyssen	G	7
(Germany) Teichmann Racing	Porsche 992 GT3 Cup	131	(Germany) David Kiefer	Am	1–4, 6
(Germany) Teichmann Racing	Porsche 992 GT3 Cup	131	(Germany) Marius Kiefer	Am	1–4, 6
(Germany) Teichmann Racing	Porsche 992 GT3 Cup	131	(Germany) Stefan Kiefer	Am	1–4, 6
(Germany) Teichmann Racing	Porsche 992 GT3 Cup	131	(Austria) Luca Rettenbacher	Am	1–4, 6
CUP3
(Germany) Adrenalin Motorsport Team Mainhatten Wheels	Porsche 718 Cayman GT4 RS Clubsport	930	(Austria) David Griessner	Am	1–8
(Germany) Adrenalin Motorsport Team Mainhatten Wheels	Porsche 718 Cayman GT4 RS Clubsport	930	(Germany) Stefan Kruse	Am	1–8
(Germany) Adrenalin Motorsport Team Mainhatten Wheels	Porsche 718 Cayman GT4 RS Clubsport	930	(Germany) Roland Froese	Am	1–4
(Germany) Adrenalin Motorsport Team Mainhatten Wheels	Porsche 718 Cayman GT4 RS Clubsport	930	(Switzerland) Ranko Mijatovic	Am	6–8
(Germany) Adrenalin Motorsport Team Mainhatten Wheels	Porsche 718 Cayman GT4 RS Clubsport	930	(United Kingdom) Brett Lidsey	Am	5
(Germany) Adrenalin Motorsport Team Mainhatten Wheels	Porsche 718 Cayman GT4 RS Clubsport	930	(Germany) Matthias Beckwermert	Am	6
(Germany) Black Falcon	Porsche 718 Cayman GT4 RS Clubsport	931	(United States) Mark Smith	G	3–4
(Germany) Black Falcon	Porsche 718 Cayman GT4 RS Clubsport	931	(Netherlands) Morris Schuring	G	3
(Germany) Black Falcon	Porsche 718 Cayman GT4 RS Clubsport	931	(Italy) Daniele di Amato	G	4
(Germany) Black Falcon	Porsche 718 Cayman GT4 RS Clubsport	931	(United States) Ryan Harrison	G	5–6
(Germany) Black Falcon	Porsche 718 Cayman GT4 RS Clubsport	931	(United States) Thomas Roberts	G	5–6
(Germany) Black Falcon	Porsche 718 Cayman GT4 RS Clubsport	931	(Romania) Sergiu Nicolae	G	8
(Germany) Black Falcon	Porsche 718 Cayman GT4 RS Clubsport	931	(Netherlands) Flynt Schuring	G	8
(Germany) Black Falcon	Porsche 718 Cayman GT4 RS Clubsport	980	(Germany) David Barst	G	5–6, 8
(Germany) Black Falcon	Porsche 718 Cayman GT4 RS Clubsport	980	(Germany) Nils Schwenk	G	5–6, 8
(Germany) Black Falcon	Porsche 718 Cayman GT4 RS Clubsport	980	(Germany) Axel Sartingen	G	8
(United Kingdom) Breakell Racing	Porsche 718 Cayman GT4 RS Clubsport	933	(United Kingdom) James Breakell	G	3–4
(United Kingdom) Breakell Racing	Porsche 718 Cayman GT4 RS Clubsport	933	(New Zealand) Grant Dalton	G	3–4
(United Kingdom) Breakell Racing	Porsche 718 Cayman GT4 RS Clubsport	933	(New Zealand) Grant Woolford	G	3–4
(Switzerland) NEF Motorsport AG	Porsche 718 Cayman GT4 RS Clubsport	934	(Switzerland) Heinz Schuoler	G	3–4
(Switzerland) NEF Motorsport AG	Porsche 718 Cayman GT4 RS Clubsport	934	(Switzerland) Kurt Spycher	G	3–4
(Switzerland) NEF Motorsport AG	Porsche 718 Cayman GT4 RS Clubsport	934	(Switzerland) Philipp Hagnauer	G	7
(Switzerland) NEF Motorsport AG	Porsche 718 Cayman GT4 RS Clubsport	934	(Switzerland) Alexander Walker	G	7
(Belgium) Mühlner Motorsport	Porsche 718 Cayman GT4 RS Clubsport	939	(Slovakia) Antal Zcigo	G	7–8
(Belgium) Mühlner Motorsport	Porsche 718 Cayman GT4 RS Clubsport	939	(Germany) Thorsten Jung	G	7
(Belgium) Mühlner Motorsport	Porsche 718 Cayman GT4 RS Clubsport	939	(Germany) Janis Waldow	G	8
(Germany) Schmickler Performance powered by Ravenol	Porsche 718 Cayman GT4 RS Clubsport	940	(Germany) Helmut Baumann	G	7
(Germany) Schmickler Performance powered by Ravenol	Porsche 718 Cayman GT4 RS Clubsport	940	(Germany) Klaus Niesen	G	7
(Germany) Schmickler Performance powered by Ravenol	Porsche 718 Cayman GT4 RS Clubsport	950	(Germany) Horst Baumann	Am	1–8
(Germany) Schmickler Performance powered by Ravenol	Porsche 718 Cayman GT4 RS Clubsport	950	(Germany) Stefan Schmickler	Am	1–8
(Germany) Schmickler Performance powered by Ravenol	Porsche 718 Cayman GT4 RS Clubsport	950	(Germany) Markus Schmickler	Am	2–4, 6
(Germany) Schmickler Performance powered by Ravenol	Porsche 718 Cayman GT4 RS Clubsport	960	(Germany) Rolf Ludwig Becker	G	1–2, 5
(Germany) Schmickler Performance powered by Ravenol	Porsche 718 Cayman GT4 RS Clubsport	960	(Germany) Klaus Niesen	G	1–2, 5
(Germany) Schmickler Performance powered by Ravenol	Porsche 718 Cayman GT4 RS Clubsport	960	(Germany) Jan Christopher Kortüm	G	1–2
(Germany) Schmickler Performance powered by Ravenol	Porsche 718 Cayman GT4 RS Clubsport	970	(Germany) Constantin Berz	AG	1–7
(Germany) Schmickler Performance powered by Ravenol	Porsche 718 Cayman GT4 RS Clubsport	970	(Germany) Marcus Berz	AG	1–7
(Germany) Team Oehme	Porsche 718 Cayman GT4 RS Clubsport	944	(Germany) Leonard Oehme	AG	5–8
(Germany) Team Oehme	Porsche 718 Cayman GT4 RS Clubsport	944	(Germany) Moritz Oehme	AG	5–8
(Germany) Team Oehme	Porsche 718 Cayman GT4 RS Clubsport	944	(Germany) Niklas Oehme	AG	5, 8
(Germany) mcchip-dkr ^{1–3} (Thailand) Renazzo Motorsport Team ^{5–8}	Porsche 718 Cayman GT4 RS Clubsport	945	(Germany) Philipp Eis	Am	1
(Germany) mcchip-dkr ^{1–3} (Thailand) Renazzo Motorsport Team ^{5–8}	Porsche 718 Cayman GT4 RS Clubsport	945	(Japan) Kohei Fukuda	Am	1
(Germany) mcchip-dkr ^{1–3} (Thailand) Renazzo Motorsport Team ^{5–8}	Porsche 718 Cayman GT4 RS Clubsport	945	(Germany) Markus Nölken	Am	1
(Germany) mcchip-dkr ^{1–3} (Thailand) Renazzo Motorsport Team ^{5–8}	Porsche 718 Cayman GT4 RS Clubsport	945	(Japan) Kouichi Okumura	Am	1
(Germany) mcchip-dkr ^{1–3} (Thailand) Renazzo Motorsport Team ^{5–8}	Porsche 718 Cayman GT4 RS Clubsport	945	(Germany) Markus Nölken	AG	2–3, 5, 7
(Germany) mcchip-dkr ^{1–3} (Thailand) Renazzo Motorsport Team ^{5–8}	Porsche 718 Cayman GT4 RS Clubsport	945	(Germany) Philipp Eis	AG	2–3
(Germany) mcchip-dkr ^{1–3} (Thailand) Renazzo Motorsport Team ^{5–8}	Porsche 718 Cayman GT4 RS Clubsport	945	(Germany) Nils Steinberg	AG	7–8
(Germany) mcchip-dkr ^{1–3} (Thailand) Renazzo Motorsport Team ^{5–8}	Porsche 718 Cayman GT4 RS Clubsport	945	(Germany) Otto Klohs	AG	2
(Germany) mcchip-dkr ^{1–3} (Thailand) Renazzo Motorsport Team ^{5–8}	Porsche 718 Cayman GT4 RS Clubsport	945	(Germany) Yves Volte	AG	5
(Germany) mcchip-dkr ^{1–3} (Thailand) Renazzo Motorsport Team ^{5–8}	Porsche 718 Cayman GT4 RS Clubsport	945	(Japan) Kohei Fukuda	AG	8
(Germany) SRS Team Sorg Rennsport	Porsche 718 Cayman GT4 RS Clubsport	949	(Italy) Edoardo Bugane	AG	1–4
(Germany) SRS Team Sorg Rennsport	Porsche 718 Cayman GT4 RS Clubsport	949	(Denmark) Mads Gravsen	AG	1–4
(Germany) SRS Team Sorg Rennsport	Porsche 718 Cayman GT4 RS Clubsport	949	(United Kingdom) Harley Haughton	AG	1–4
(Germany) SRS Team Sorg Rennsport	Porsche 718 Cayman GT4 RS Clubsport	949	(Denmark) Mads Gravsen	P	5–8
(Germany) SRS Team Sorg Rennsport	Porsche 718 Cayman GT4 RS Clubsport	949	(United Kingdom) Harley Haughton	P	5–8
(Germany) SRS Team Sorg Rennsport	Porsche 718 Cayman GT4 RS Clubsport	949	(Lithuania) Kasparas Vingilis	P	7–8
(Germany) SRS Team Sorg Rennsport	Porsche 718 Cayman GT4 RS Clubsport	949	(Italy) Edoardo Bugane	P	5
(Germany) SRS Team Sorg Rennsport	Porsche 718 Cayman GT4 RS Clubsport	949	(Germany) Björn Simon	P	6
(Germany) SRS Team Sorg Rennsport	Porsche 718 Cayman GT4 RS Clubsport	959	(Germany) Heiko Eichenberg	P	1–8
(Germany) SRS Team Sorg Rennsport	Porsche 718 Cayman GT4 RS Clubsport	959	(Germany) Fabio Grosse	P	1–8
(Germany) SRS Team Sorg Rennsport	Porsche 718 Cayman GT4 RS Clubsport	959	(Germany) Patrik Grütter	P	1–8
(Germany) SRS Team Sorg Rennsport	Porsche 718 Cayman GT4 RS Clubsport	969	(Ukraine) Oleksiy Kikireshko	Am	1–8
(Germany) SRS Team Sorg Rennsport	Porsche 718 Cayman GT4 RS Clubsport	969	(Germany) Rüdiger Schicht	Am	1–8
(Germany) SRS Team Sorg Rennsport	Porsche 718 Cayman GT4 RS Clubsport	969	(Germany) Alex Fielenbach	Am	1–6, 8
(Germany) SRS Team Sorg Rennsport	Porsche 718 Cayman GT4 RS Clubsport	969	(Germany) Henning Eschweiler	Am	6
(Germany) SRS Team Sorg Rennsport	Porsche 718 Cayman GT4 RS Clubsport	989	(Italy) Christian Coen	G	5
(Germany) SRS Team Sorg Rennsport	Porsche 718 Cayman GT4 RS Clubsport	989	(Austria) Johannes Dujsik	G	5
(Germany) SRS Team Sorg Rennsport	Porsche 718 Cayman GT4 RS Clubsport	989	(Germany) Jan-Niklas Stieler	G	5
(Germany) Smyrlis Racing	Porsche 718 Cayman GT4 RS Clubsport	952	(Germany) Christopher Rink	P	1–3, 5, 7–8
(Germany) Smyrlis Racing	Porsche 718 Cayman GT4 RS Clubsport	952	(Italy) Francesco Merlini	P	1–3
(Germany) Smyrlis Racing	Porsche 718 Cayman GT4 RS Clubsport	952	(Germany) Philipp Stahlschmidt	P	3, 5, 7
(Germany) Smyrlis Racing	Porsche 718 Cayman GT4 RS Clubsport	952	(Germany) Timo Mölig	P	2
(Germany) Smyrlis Racing	Porsche 718 Cayman GT4 RS Clubsport	952	(Germany) Phil Hill	P	8
(Germany) Smyrlis Racing	Porsche 718 Cayman GT4 RS Clubsport	953	(Germany) Alex Koch	AG	1–5, 7–8
(Germany) Smyrlis Racing	Porsche 718 Cayman GT4 RS Clubsport	953	(Germany) Niklas Koch	AG	1–5, 7–8
(Germany) Smyrlis Racing	Porsche 718 Cayman GT4 RS Clubsport	953	(Germany) Anton Ruf	AG	1–5
(Germany) Speedworxx Automotive	Porsche 718 Cayman GT4 RS Clubsport	956	(Italy) Roberto di Folco	G	1
(Germany) Speedworxx Automotive	Porsche 718 Cayman GT4 RS Clubsport	956	(Germany) Salman Owega	G	1
(Germany) Speedworxx Automotive	Porsche 718 Cayman GT4 RS Clubsport	956	(Albania) Boris Hrubesch	G	6
(Germany) Speedworxx Automotive	Porsche 718 Cayman GT4 RS Clubsport	956	(Germany) Franz Linden	G	6
(Germany) Speedworxx Automotive	Porsche 718 Cayman GT4 RS Clubsport	956	(Germany) Finn Wiebelhaus	G	6
(Germany) AVIA W&S Motorsport	Porsche 718 Cayman GT4 RS Clubsport	961	(Germany) René Höber	G	3–4, 7
(Germany) AVIA W&S Motorsport	Porsche 718 Cayman GT4 RS Clubsport	961	(United States) Andreas Gabler	G	3–4
(Germany) AVIA W&S Motorsport	Porsche 718 Cayman GT4 RS Clubsport	961	(Germany) Alexander Müller	G	3–4
(Germany) AVIA W&S Motorsport	Porsche 718 Cayman GT4 RS Clubsport	961	(Germany) Markus Lönnroth	G	7
(Germany) AVIA W&S Motorsport	Porsche 718 Cayman GT4 RS Clubsport	961	(Germany) Peter Siebert	G	7
(Germany) AVIA W&S Motorsport	Porsche 718 Cayman GT4 RS Clubsport	962	(Germany) Joshua Bednarski	P	1–6, 8
(Germany) AVIA W&S Motorsport	Porsche 718 Cayman GT4 RS Clubsport	962	(Germany) Lucas Daugaard	P	1–6, 8
(Germany) AVIA W&S Motorsport	Porsche 718 Cayman GT4 RS Clubsport	962	(Germany) Moritz Oberheim	P	1–6, 8
	Porsche 718 Cayman GT4 RS Clubsport	963	(Germany) Franz Linden	G	7
	Porsche 718 Cayman GT4 RS Clubsport	963	(Germany) "Montana"	G	7
(Germany) Lionspeed GP	Porsche 718 Cayman GT4 RS Clubsport	979	(Hong Kong) Antares Au	G	1–2
(Germany) Lionspeed GP	Porsche 718 Cayman GT4 RS Clubsport	979	(South Africa) Mikaeel Pitamber	G	1–2
(Germany) Lionspeed GP	Porsche 718 Cayman GT4 RS Clubsport	979	(Netherlands) Thierry Vermeulen	G	1–2

Icon	Class
992 entries
Icon	Class
P	Cup 2-Pro
Am	Cup 2-Am
AG	Cup 2-Am Guest
G	Guest
Cayman GT4 entries
Icon	Class
P	Cup 3-Pro
Am	Cup 3-Am
AG	Cup 3-Am Guest
G	Guest

=== Other classes ===
==== NLS specials ====
Team	Car	No.	Drivers	Rounds
SP-X
(South Korea) Hankook Competition	Porsche 992 GT3 Cup	60	(Netherlands) Roelof Bruins	3–4
(South Korea) Hankook Competition	Porsche 992 GT3 Cup	60	(United States) Steven Cho	3–4
(South Korea) Hankook Competition	Porsche 992 GT3 Cup	60	(South Korea) Kim Jong-Kyum	3–4
(United States) Glickenhaus Racing LLC	Glickenhaus SCG 004c	706	(Germany) Lance David Arnold	1–4
(United States) Glickenhaus Racing LLC	Glickenhaus SCG 004c	706	(France) Franck Mailleux	1–4
(United States) Glickenhaus Racing LLC	Glickenhaus SCG 004c	706	(Germany) Thomas Mutsch	1–4
(United States) Glickenhaus Racing LLC	Glickenhaus SCG 004c	706	(France) Côme Ledogar	3–4
SP-Pro
(Germany) Toyo Tires with Ring Racing	Porsche 991 Cup GT3	347	(Germany) Andreas Gülden	6–8
(Germany) Toyo Tires with Ring Racing	Porsche 991 Cup GT3	347	(Germany) Marc Hennerici	6–8
(Germany) Toyo Tires with Ring Racing	Porsche 991 Cup GT3	347	(Germany) Tim Sandtler	6–8
(Germany) Toyo Tires with Ring Racing	Porsche 991 Cup GT3	347	(Germany) Uwe Kleen	6–7
SP8
No entries
SP8T
(Germany) PROsport-Racing	Aston Martin Vantage AMR GT4	140	(Belgium) Guido Dumarey	7–8
(Germany) PROsport-Racing	Aston Martin Vantage AMR GT4	140	(Chile) Benjamin Hites	5
(Germany) PROsport-Racing	Aston Martin Vantage AMR GT4	140	(Germany) Jörg Viebahn	5
(Germany) PROsport-Racing	Aston Martin Vantage AMR GT4	140	(United Kingdom) Harry Rice	7
(Germany) PROsport-Racing	Aston Martin Vantage AMR GT4	140	(Belgium) Maxime Dumarey	8
(Singapore) Giti Tire Motorsport by WS Racing	BMW M4 GT4 Gen II	146	(Netherlands) Beitske Visser	1–7
(Singapore) Giti Tire Motorsport by WS Racing	BMW M4 GT4 Gen II	146	(Germany) Carrie Schreiner	1, 3–4, 6, 8
(Singapore) Giti Tire Motorsport by WS Racing	BMW M4 GT4 Gen II	146	(Liechtenstein) Fabienne Wohlwend	2–4, 6
(Singapore) Giti Tire Motorsport by WS Racing	BMW M4 GT4 Gen II	146	(Latvia) Patricija Stalidzane	5–8
(Singapore) Giti Tire Motorsport by WS Racing	BMW M4 GT4 Gen II	146	(United Kingdom) Pippa Mann	1–2
(Singapore) Giti Tire Motorsport by WS Racing	BMW M4 GT4 Gen II	146	(Germany) Janina Schall	5, 7–8
(Singapore) Giti Tire Motorsport by WS Racing	BMW M4 GT4 Gen II	147	(Germany) Ulrich Schmidt	1, 3–5
(Singapore) Giti Tire Motorsport by WS Racing	BMW M4 GT4 Gen II	147	(France) Oliver Wenzel	3–5
(Singapore) Giti Tire Motorsport by WS Racing	BMW M4 GT4 Gen II	147	(Switzerland) Andreas Simon	1
(Singapore) Giti Tire Motorsport by WS Racing	BMW M4 GT4 Gen II	147	(Monaco) Micah Stanley	5
	BMW M2 ClubSport Racing	149	(United Kingdom) Matthew Hampson	6–7
	BMW M2 ClubSport Racing	149	(United Kingdom) Andrew Schulz	6–7
(Germany) Team Bilstein by Black Falcon	BMW M4 GT4 Gen II	150	(United Kingdom) Jimmy Broadbent	1–7
(Germany) Team Bilstein by Black Falcon	BMW M4 GT4 Gen II	150	(Germany) Manuel Metzger	1–7
(Germany) Team Bilstein by Black Falcon	BMW M4 GT4 Gen II	150	(United Kingdom) Steve Alvarez Brown	1–4, 6–7
(Germany) Team Bilstein by Black Falcon	BMW M4 GT4 Gen II	150	(Netherlands) Misha Charoudin	1–5
(Germany) Schmickler Performance powered by Ravenol	BMW M4 GT4 Gen II	151	(Germany) Michael Luther	1, 5
(Germany) Schmickler Performance powered by Ravenol	BMW M4 GT4 Gen II	151	(Germany) Markus Schmickler	1
(Germany) Schmickler Performance powered by Ravenol	BMW M4 GT4 Gen II	151	(Germany) Jan Christopher Kortüm	5
(Canada) ST Racing	BMW M4 GT4 Gen II	158	(United States) Jon Miller	5
(Canada) ST Racing	BMW M4 GT4 Gen II	158	(Canada) Samantha Tan	5
(Japan) Toyota Gazoo Racing	Toyota GR Supra GT4 Evo	172	(Belgium) Herwig Daenens	5–6
(Japan) Toyota Gazoo Racing	Toyota GR Supra GT4 Evo	172	(Japan) Daisuke Toyoda	5–6
(Japan) Toyota Gazoo Racing	Toyota GR Supra GT4 Evo	172	(Japan) Kazuki Nakajima	5
(Japan) Toyota Gazoo Racing	Toyota GR Supra GT4 Evo	172	(Japan) Kamui Kobayashi	6
(Japan) Toyota Gazoo Racing	Toyota GR Supra GT4 Evo	173	(Belgium) Herwig Daenens	5–6
(Japan) Toyota Gazoo Racing	Toyota GR Supra GT4 Evo	173	(Germany) Uwe Kleen	5–6
(Japan) Toyota Gazoo Racing	Toyota GR Supra GT4 Evo	173	(Japan) Daisuke Toyoda	5–6
(Japan) Toyota Gazoo Racing	Toyota GR Supra GT4 Evo	173	(Japan) Kamui Kobayashi	6
(Germany) Frikadelli Racing Team	BMW M4 GT4 Gen II	178	(Switzerland) Jacques Castelein	3
(Germany) Frikadelli Racing Team	BMW M4 GT4 Gen II	178	(Belgium) Kurt Dujardyn	3
(Germany) Dörr Motorsport	Aston Martin Vantage AMR GT4	169	(Germany) Oskar Sandberg	3–4
(Germany) Dörr Motorsport	Aston Martin Vantage AMR GT4	169	(Germany) Aaron Wenisch	3–4
(Germany) Dörr Motorsport	Aston Martin Vantage AMR GT4	169	(Germany) Nick Wüstenhagen	3–4
(Germany) Dörr Motorsport	Aston Martin Vantage AMR GT4	179	(Norway) Niklas Eker Abrahamsen	1–2
(Germany) Dörr Motorsport	Aston Martin Vantage AMR GT4	179	(France) Philippe Charlaix	1–2
(Germany) Dörr Motorsport	Aston Martin Vantage AMR GT4	179	(Austria) Jannik-Julius Bernhard	2
(Germany) Dörr Motorsport	Aston Martin Vantage AMR GT4	269	(Norway) Niklas Eker Abrahamsen	3–4
(Germany) Dörr Motorsport	Aston Martin Vantage AMR GT4	269	(France) Philippe Charlaix	3–4
(Germany) Dörr Motorsport	Aston Martin Vantage AMR GT4	269	(Germany) Phil Dörr	3–4
(Germany) Dörr Motorsport	Aston Martin Vantage AMR GT4	269	(Germany) Michael Funke	3
SP7
	Porsche 991 Cup GT3 MR	70	(Germany) Georg Goder	6–7
	Porsche 991 Cup GT3 MR	70	(Germany) Ralf Oehme	6–7
	Porsche 991 Cup GT3 MR	70	(Germany) Martin Schlüter	6–7
	Porsche 991 Cup GT3 MR	70	(Germany) Carl-Friedrich Kolb	6
(Germany) MSC Kempenich e.V. im ADAC	Porsche Cayman GT4 Clubsport	77	(Germany) Kim Berwanger	6
(Germany) MSC Kempenich e.V. im ADAC	Porsche Cayman GT4 Clubsport	77	(Germany) Thorsten Held	6
(Germany) MSC Kempenich e.V. im ADAC	Porsche Cayman GT4 Clubsport	77	(Germany) Christian Kohlhaas	6
(Germany) MSC Kempenich e.V. im ADAC	Porsche Cayman GT4 Clubsport	77	(Germany) Etienne Ploenes	6
(Germany) KKrämer Racing	Porsche Cayman GT4	78	(Germany) Olaf Baunack	6
(Germany) KKrämer Racing	Porsche Cayman GT4	78	(Germany) Karl-Heinz Meyer	6
(Germany) KKrämer Racing	Porsche Cayman GT4	78	(Germany) Lars Holtkamp	6
(Germany) KKrämer Racing	Porsche Cayman GT4	78	(Poland) Jacek Pydys	6
(Germany) KKrämer Racing	Porsche Cayman GT4	78	(Germany) Julian Netzbandt	8
(Germany) KKrämer Racing	Porsche Cayman GT4	78	(Germany) Jürgen Oehler	8
(Germany) Plusline Racing Team	Porsche 718 Cayman GT4 RS Clubsport	80	(Germany) Fabio Sacchi	1–7
(Germany) Plusline Racing Team	Porsche 718 Cayman GT4 RS Clubsport	80	(Germany) Reiner Neuffer	1, 3–6
(Germany) Plusline Racing Team	Porsche 718 Cayman GT4 RS Clubsport	80	(Germany) Benedikt Höpfer	5, 7
(Germany) Plusline Racing Team	Porsche 718 Cayman GT4 RS Clubsport	80	(Germany) Christoph Ruhrmann	1
(Germany) Plusline Racing Team	Porsche 718 Cayman GT4 RS Clubsport	80	(Germany) Matthias Beckwermert	2
(Germany) Plusline Racing Team	Porsche 718 Cayman GT4 RS Clubsport	80	(Germany) Philipp Gresek	3
(Germany) Plusline Racing Team	Porsche 718 Cayman GT4 RS Clubsport	80	(Germany) Christian Knötschke	6
(Singapore) Giti Tire Motorsport by WS Racing	Porsche 718 Cayman GT4 Clubsport	90	(Germany) Maximilian Eisberg	6–7
(Singapore) Giti Tire Motorsport by WS Racing	Porsche 718 Cayman GT4 Clubsport	90	(Germany) Robert Hinzer	6–7
(Singapore) Giti Tire Motorsport by WS Racing	Porsche 718 Cayman GT4 Clubsport	90	(Germany) Lukas Drost	6
(Singapore) Giti Tire Motorsport by WS Racing	Porsche 718 Cayman GT4 Clubsport	90	(Germany) Lorenz Stegmann	6
(Singapore) Giti Tire Motorsport by WS Racing	Porsche 718 Cayman GT4 Clubsport	90	(Monaco) Micah Stanley	7
SP6
(Switzerland) Hofor-Racing	BMW M3 E46	207	(Switzerland) Michael Kroll	3
(Switzerland) Hofor-Racing	BMW M3 E46	207	(Germany) Thomas Mühlenz	3
(Switzerland) Hofor-Racing	BMW M3 E46	207	(Switzerland) Alexander Prinz	3
(Switzerland) Hofor-Racing	BMW M3 E46	207	(Switzerland) Chantal Prinz	3
SP4T
(Germany) Fly&Help	Volkswagen New Beetle RSR	13	(Germany) Bernd Albrecht	3–4
(Germany) Fly&Help	Volkswagen New Beetle RSR	13	(Germany) Sebastian Asch	3–4
(Germany) Fly&Help	Volkswagen New Beetle RSR	13	(Germany) Carsten Knechtges	3
(Germany) Fly&Help	Volkswagen New Beetle RSR	13	(Germany) Julian Reeh	4
(Japan) Subaru Tecnica International	Subaru WRX STI GT N24	88	(Japan) Rintaro Kubo	3–4
(Japan) Subaru Tecnica International	Subaru WRX STI GT N24	88	(Germany) Tim Schrick	3–4
(Belgium) Kgl. Auto-Moto-Club St.Vith	Porsche 718 Cayman	266	(Belgium) Jacques Derenne	5, 7
(Belgium) Kgl. Auto-Moto-Club St.Vith	Porsche 718 Cayman	266	(Belgium) Olivier Muytjens	5
(Belgium) Kgl. Auto-Moto-Club St.Vith	Porsche 718 Cayman	266	(Germany) Harald Rettich	7
SP4
(Germany) Keeevin Sports and Racing	BMW E90	250	(Germany) Jörg Schönfelder	1–2
(Germany) Keeevin Sports and Racing	BMW E90	250	(Germany) Serge van Vooren	1–2
	BMW M3 E46	254	(Germany) Ingo Oepen	5, 7
	BMW M3 E46	254	(Germany) Thorsten Köppert	5
	BMW M3 E46	254	(Germany) Henrik Launhardt	5
	BMW M3 E46	254	(Germany) Christian Koger	7
SP3T
(Germany) Ollis Garage	Dacia Logan	300; 318	(Germany) Oliver Kriese	3–8
(Germany) Ollis Garage	Dacia Logan	300; 318	(Germany) Maximilian Weissermel	3, 6
(Germany) Ollis Garage	Dacia Logan	300; 318	(Germany) Yannik Lachmayer	4
(Germany) Ollis Garage	Dacia Logan	300; 318	(Germany) Gregor Starck	7
(Germany) FK Performance Motorsport	BMW M2	310	(Germany) Max Hesse	7
(Germany) FK Performance Motorsport	BMW M2	310	(Germany) Jens Klingmann	7
(Germany) MSC Sinzig e.V. im ADAC	Audi TT	311	(Germany) Wolfgang Haugg	1
(Germany) MSC Sinzig e.V. im ADAC	Audi TT	311	(Germany) Rudi Speich	1
(Germany) MSC Sinzig e.V. im ADAC	Audi TT	311	(Germany) Roland Waschkau	1
(Germany) MSC Sinzig e.V. im ADAC	Volkswagen Golf VII TCR	313	(France) Nathanaël Berthon	7
(Germany) MSC Sinzig e.V. im ADAC	Volkswagen Golf VII TCR	313	(Armenia) Artur Goroyan	7
(Germany) MSC Sinzig e.V. im ADAC	Volkswagen Golf VII TCR	313	(Germany) Danny Brink	7
(Germany) Schmickler Performance powered by Ravenol	Porsche 718 Cayman GT	319	(Germany) Heinz Dolfen	4–7
(Germany) Schmickler Performance powered by Ravenol	Porsche 718 Cayman GT	319	(Germany) Christian Heuchemer	4–5
(Germany) Schmickler Performance powered by Ravenol	Porsche 718 Cayman GT	319	(Germany) Maik Rönnefarth	5, 7
(Germany) Schmickler Performance powered by Ravenol	Porsche 718 Cayman GT	319	(Germany) Michael Grassl	6
(Germany) Schmickler Performance powered by Ravenol	Porsche 718 Cayman GT	319	(Germany) Volker Wawer	6
(Germany) MSC Kempenich e.V. im ADAC	SEAT Cup Racer	322	(Germany) Jens Wulf	5–7
(Germany) MSC Kempenich e.V. im ADAC	SEAT Cup Racer	322	(Germany) Dennis Leißing	5, 7
(Germany) MSC Kempenich e.V. im ADAC	SEAT Cup Racer	322	(Italy) Florian Haller	5
(Germany) MSC Kempenich e.V. im ADAC	SEAT Cup Racer	322	(Germany) Sebastian Schemmann	6
(Germany) MSC Kempenich e.V. im ADAC	SEAT Cup Racer	322	(Germany) Andreas Tasche	6
(Germany) MSC Kempenich e.V. im ADAC	SEAT Cup Racer	322	(Germany) Kim Berwanger	7
(Germany) Max Kruse Racing	Volkswagen Golf VII TCR	819	(Germany) Max Kruse	8
(Germany) Max Kruse Racing	Volkswagen Golf VII TCR	819	(Germany) Matthias Wasel	8
(Germany) Max Kruse Racing	Volkswagen Golf VII TCR	819	(Switzerland) Christoph Lenz	8
SP3
(Germany) Ravenol Motorsport	BMW 318ti Cup	275	(Germany) Alexander Becker	1–2, 6
(Germany) Ravenol Motorsport	BMW 318ti Cup	275	(Germany) Christopher Groth	1–2, 6
(Germany) Ravenol Motorsport	BMW 318ti Cup	275	(Germany) Marc David Müller	1–2
(Germany) Ravenol Motorsport	BMW 318ti Cup	275	(Germany) "Flurgässchen 1"	6
	Toyota GT86	288	(Germany) "Achim"	6
	Toyota GT86	288	(Germany) Theodor Devolescu	6
	Toyota GT86	288	(Germany) Benjamin Zerfeld	6
SP2
No entries
AT(-G)
(Germany) Max Kruse Racing	Volkswagen Golf GTI TCR; Volkswagen Golf VII	10	(Germany) Timo Hochwind	1–7
(Germany) Max Kruse Racing	Volkswagen Golf GTI TCR; Volkswagen Golf VII	10	(Germany) Matthias Wasel	1–7
(Germany) Max Kruse Racing	Volkswagen Golf GTI TCR; Volkswagen Golf VII	10	(Turkey) Emir Asari	1–4, 6
(Germany) Max Kruse Racing	Volkswagen Golf GTI TCR; Volkswagen Golf VII	10	(France) Benjamin Cartery	5
(Germany) Max Kruse Racing	Volkswagen Golf GTI TCR; Volkswagen Golf VII	10	(Germany) Heiko Hammel	7
(Germany) Max Kruse Racing	Porsche 991 Cup GT3	105	(Germany) Dominik Fugel	7
(Germany) Max Kruse Racing	Porsche 991 Cup GT3	105	(Germany) Marcel Fugel	7
(Germany) Max Kruse Racing	Porsche 991 Cup GT3	105	(Germany) Benjamin Leuchter	7
(Germany) Max Kruse Racing	Audi RS 3 LMS TCR	110	(Denmark) Kristian Jepsen	7
(Germany) Max Kruse Racing	Audi RS 3 LMS TCR	110	(Denmark) Jan Bisgaard Sörensen	7
(Germany) Max Kruse Racing	Volkswagen Golf GTI TCR	333	(Germany) Nicholas Otto	3–4, 7
(Germany) Max Kruse Racing	Volkswagen Golf GTI TCR	333	(Turkey) Emir Asari	3–4
(Germany) Max Kruse Racing	Volkswagen Golf GTI TCR	333	(Germany) Matthias Wasel	3–4
(Germany) Max Kruse Racing	Volkswagen Golf GTI TCR	333	(Germany) Benjamin Leuchter	6–7
(Germany) Max Kruse Racing	Volkswagen Golf GTI TCR	333	(Germany) Heiko Hammel	6
(Germany) Max Kruse Racing	Volkswagen Golf GTI TCR	333	(Germany) Timo Hochwind	7
(Germany) Max Kruse Racing	Volkswagen Golf GTI TCR	819	(Germany) Marcus Menden	6–7
(Germany) Max Kruse Racing	Volkswagen Golf GTI TCR	819	(Germany) Max Kruse	6
(Germany) Max Kruse Racing	Volkswagen Golf GTI TCR	819	(Germany) Nicholas Otto	6
(Germany) Max Kruse Racing	Volkswagen Golf GTI TCR	819	(United States) Andrew Engelmann	7
(Germany) Max Kruse Racing	Volkswagen Golf GTI TCR	819	(Germany) Matthias Wasel	7
(Germany) eFuel Team Griesemann	Toyota GR Supra GT4 Evo	227	(Germany) Heiko Hammel	3
(Germany) eFuel Team Griesemann	Toyota GR Supra GT4 Evo	227	(Germany) Yves Volte	3
(Germany) eFuel Team Griesemann	Toyota GR Supra GT4 Evo	227	(Germany) Björn Griesemann	4
(Germany) eFuel Team Griesemann	Toyota GR Supra GT4 Evo	227	(Germany) Georg Griesemann	4
(Germany) Four Motors Bioconcept-Car	Porsche 991 Cup GT3	320	(Denmark) Henrik Bollerslev	6–7
(Germany) Four Motors Bioconcept-Car	Porsche 991 Cup GT3	320	(Germany) Michelle Halder	6–7
(Germany) Four Motors Bioconcept-Car	Porsche 991 Cup GT3	320	(Germany) Smudo	6–7
(Germany) Four Motors Bioconcept-Car	Porsche 991 Cup GT3	320	(Germany) Matthias Beckwermert	6
(Germany) Four Motors Bioconcept-Car	Porsche 991 Cup GT3	320	(Germany) "Tom"	7
(Germany) Four Motors Bioconcept-Car	Porsche 718 Cayman GT4 RS Clubsport	420	(Switzerland) Marc Schöni	1–2, 7
(Germany) Four Motors Bioconcept-Car	Porsche 718 Cayman GT4 RS Clubsport	420	(Germany) Alesia Kreutzpointner	1–2
(Germany) Four Motors Bioconcept-Car	Porsche 718 Cayman GT4 RS Clubsport	420	(Germany) Jacqueline Kreutzpointner	1–2
(Germany) Four Motors Bioconcept-Car	Porsche 718 Cayman GT4 RS Clubsport	420	(Denmark) Bastian Buus	3
(Germany) Four Motors Bioconcept-Car	Porsche 718 Cayman GT4 RS Clubsport	420	(Brazil) Felipe Nasr	3
(Germany) Four Motors Bioconcept-Car	Porsche 718 Cayman GT4 RS Clubsport	420	(Switzerland) Marco Antonio Timbal	7
(Germany) Four Motors Bioconcept-Car	Porsche 718 Cayman GT4 RS Clubsport	633	(Germany) Henning Cramer	1, 6–7
(Germany) Four Motors Bioconcept-Car	Porsche 718 Cayman GT4 RS Clubsport	633	(Germany) Oliver Sprungmann	1, 6–7
(Germany) Four Motors Bioconcept-Car	Porsche 718 Cayman GT4 RS Clubsport	633	(Germany) Karl Pflanz	1, 6
(Germany) Four Motors Bioconcept-Car	Porsche 718 Cayman GT4 RS Clubsport	633	(Switzerland) Marc Schöni	6
(Germany) Four Motors Bioconcept-Car	Porsche 718 Cayman GT4 RS Clubsport	633	(Germany) Georg Kiefer	7

Note: The numbers 60 and 347 entered Porsche 992 GT3 Cup cars are entered outside the CUP2 class due to running on different tyres

==== TCR ====
Team	Car	No.	Drivers	Rounds
(Germany) MSC Emstal e.V. im ADAC ^{1–4} (Germany) MSC Kempenich e.V. im ADAC ^{6} unnamed ^{7}	Volkswagen Golf GTI TCR	800	(Germany) Sebastian Schemmann	1–4, 6–7
(Germany) MSC Emstal e.V. im ADAC ^{1–4} (Germany) MSC Kempenich e.V. im ADAC ^{6} unnamed ^{7}	Volkswagen Golf GTI TCR	800	(Italy) Florian Haller	3–4, 6
(Germany) MSC Emstal e.V. im ADAC ^{1–4} (Germany) MSC Kempenich e.V. im ADAC ^{6} unnamed ^{7}	Volkswagen Golf GTI TCR	800	(Germany) Jens Wulf	1–2
(Germany) MSC Emstal e.V. im ADAC ^{1–4} (Germany) MSC Kempenich e.V. im ADAC ^{6} unnamed ^{7}	Volkswagen Golf GTI TCR	800	(Germany) Meik Utsch	2, 4
(Germany) MSC Emstal e.V. im ADAC ^{1–4} (Germany) MSC Kempenich e.V. im ADAC ^{6} unnamed ^{7}	Volkswagen Golf GTI TCR	800	(Germany) Philip Schauerte	6–7
(Germany) MSC Emstal e.V. im ADAC ^{1–4} (Germany) MSC Kempenich e.V. im ADAC ^{6} unnamed ^{7}	Volkswagen Golf GTI TCR	800	(Italy) Daniel Fink	6
(Germany) MSC Emstal e.V. im ADAC ^{1–4} (Germany) MSC Kempenich e.V. im ADAC ^{6} unnamed ^{7}	Volkswagen Golf GTI TCR	800	(Japan) Junichi Umemoto	7
(Germany) MSC Emstal e.V. im ADAC ^{1–4} (Germany) MSC Kempenich e.V. im ADAC ^{6} unnamed ^{7}	Volkswagen Golf GTI TCR	800	(Jordan) Nadir Zuhour	7
(Norway) Møller Bil Motorsport	Audi RS 3 LMS TCR (2017)	801	(Norway) Kenneth Østvold	1, 3, 5, 7
(Norway) Møller Bil Motorsport	Audi RS 3 LMS TCR (2017)	801	(Norway) Håkon Schjærin	1, 3, 5, 7
(Norway) Møller Bil Motorsport	Audi RS 3 LMS TCR (2017)	801	(Norway) Atle Gulbrandsen	1, 7
(Norway) Møller Bil Motorsport	Audi RS 3 LMS TCR (2017)	801	(Norway) Anders Lindstad	3, 5
(Germany) MSC Sinzig e.V. im ADAC	Cupra León TCR	806	(United States) Benjamin Koslowski	8
(Germany) MSC Sinzig e.V. im ADAC	Cupra León TCR	806	(Netherlands) Filip Hoenjet	8
(Germany) AC 1927 Mayen e.V. im ADAC	Audi RS 3 LMS TCR (2017)	808	(Sweden) Johan Kristoffersson	1–2
(Germany) AC 1927 Mayen e.V. im ADAC	Audi RS 3 LMS TCR (2017)	808	(Netherlands) Paul Meijer	1–2
(Germany) AC 1927 Mayen e.V. im ADAC	Audi RS 3 LMS TCR (2017)	808	(Germany) Julian Reeh	1–2
(Germany) AC 1927 Mayen e.V. im ADAC	Audi RS 3 LMS TCR (2017)	808	(United States) Benjamin Koslowski	7
(Germany) AC 1927 Mayen e.V. im ADAC	Audi RS 3 LMS TCR (2017)	808	(Germany) Moritz Rosenbach	7
	Audi RS 3 LMS TCR (2017)	809	(Germany) Rene Steiger	3–4
	Audi RS 3 LMS TCR (2017)	809	(Netherlands) Paul Meijer	3
	Audi RS 3 LMS TCR (2017)	809	(Germany) Bernd Strenge	3
	Audi RS 3 LMS TCR (2017)	809	(Germany) Leon Dreiser	4
	Cupra León TCR	811	(Italy) Armando Stanco	5–8
	Cupra León TCR	811	(Italy) Dario Stanco	5–8
(Germany) Bonk Motorsport GmbH	Peugeot 308 TCR	821	(Germany) Joachim Nett	6–7
(Germany) Bonk Motorsport GmbH	Peugeot 308 TCR	821	(Germany) Jürgen Nett	6–7
(Germany) Bonk Motorsport GmbH	Peugeot 308 TCR	821	(Germany) Timo Beuth	6
(Luxembourg) JP Motorsport	Cupra León TCR	827	(Austria) Christian Klien	3–4
(Luxembourg) JP Motorsport	Cupra León TCR	827	(Poland) Patryk Krupinski	3–4
(Luxembourg) JP Motorsport	Cupra León TCR	827	(Austria) Norbert Siedler	3–4
(South Korea) Hyundai Motorsport N	Hyundai Elantra N TCR (2024)	830	(Spain) Mikel Azcona	3–4
(South Korea) Hyundai Motorsport N	Hyundai Elantra N TCR (2024)	830	(Germany) Marc Basseng	3–4
(South Korea) Hyundai Motorsport N	Hyundai Elantra N TCR (2024)	830	(Germany) Manuel Lauck	3–4
(South Korea) Hyundai Motorsport N	Hyundai Elantra N TCR (2024)	831	(United States) Mason Filippi	3–4
(South Korea) Hyundai Motorsport N	Hyundai Elantra N TCR (2024)	831	(United States) Bryson Morris	3–4
(South Korea) Hyundai Motorsport N	Hyundai Elantra N TCR (2024)	831	(Canada) Mark Wilkins	3–4
(South Korea) Hyundai Motorsport N	Hyundai Elantra N TCR (2024)	832	(China) Cao Hongwei	3–4
(South Korea) Hyundai Motorsport N	Hyundai Elantra N TCR (2024)	832	(Hong Kong) Yan Cheuk Wai	3–4
(South Korea) Hyundai Motorsport N	Hyundai Elantra N TCR (2024)	832	(China) He Xiaole	3–4
(South Korea) Hyundai Motorsport N	Hyundai Elantra N TCR (2024)	832	(China) Zhendong Zhang	3–4
(Italy) Target Competition	Hyundai Elantra N TCR	831	(Canada) Robert Wickens	1
(Italy) Target Competition	Hyundai Elantra N TCR	831	(Canada) Mark Wilkins	1

==== NLS production cars ====
Team	Car	No.	Drivers	Rounds
V6
(Germany) Adrenalin Motorsport Team Mainhatten Wheels	Porsche Cayman S	396	(Germany) Christian Büllesbach	1–8
(Germany) Adrenalin Motorsport Team Mainhatten Wheels	Porsche Cayman S	396	(Germany) Lutz Rühl	1–8
(Germany) Adrenalin Motorsport Team Mainhatten Wheels	Porsche Cayman S	396	(Germany) Andreas Schettler	1–8
(Germany) Adrenalin Motorsport Team Mainhatten Wheels	Porsche Cayman S	396	(Germany) Daniel Zils	1–8
(Germany) Schmickler Performance powered by Ravenol	Porsche 911	400	(Germany) Christian Heuchemer	6–7
(Germany) Schmickler Performance powered by Ravenol	Porsche 911	400	(Germany) Thomas Heuchemer	6–7
(Germany) Schmickler Performance powered by Ravenol	Porsche 911	400	(Germany) Sascha Kloft	6
(Germany) MSC Adenau e.V. im ADAC	Porsche Cayman	410	(Switzerland) David Ackermann	1–8
(Germany) MSC Adenau e.V. im ADAC	Porsche Cayman	410	(France) Joel Le Bihan	1–4
(Germany) MSC Adenau e.V. im ADAC	Porsche Cayman	410	(Germany) Axel Jahn	1–2, 7
(Germany) MSC Adenau e.V. im ADAC	Porsche Cayman	410	(Italy) Stefano Croci	3–4, 7
(Germany) MSC Adenau e.V. im ADAC	Porsche Cayman	410	(Germany) Stefan Müller	3–4, 8
(Germany) MSC Adenau e.V. im ADAC	Porsche Cayman	410	(Germany) Marcel Weber	5–6, 8
(Germany) MSC Adenau e.V. im ADAC	Porsche Cayman	410	(Germany) Jérôme Larbi	1–2
(Germany) MSC Adenau e.V. im ADAC	Porsche Cayman	410	(Germany) Georg Arbinger	5
(Germany) MSC Adenau e.V. im ADAC	Porsche Cayman	410	(Sweden) Eric Ullström	6
(Germany) MSC Adenau e.V. im ADAC	Porsche Cayman	410	(Italy) Aleardo Bertelli	7
	Porsche 911 Carrera	416	(Switzerland) Sebastian Rings	3–4, 6
	Porsche 911 Carrera	416	(Germany) Andreas Schaflitzl	3–4, 6
	Porsche 911 Carrera	416	(Germany) Bastian Arend	3
	Porsche 911 Carrera	416	(Germany) Alexander Köppen	6
	Porsche 911 Carrera	416	(Germany) John Lee Schambony	6
V5
	Porsche Cayman	440	(Germany) Florian Ebener	1–2
	Porsche Cayman	440	(Germany) Florian Quante	1–2
(Germany) Plusline Racing Team	Porsche Cayman	441	(Germany) Reiner Neuffer	8
(Germany) Plusline Racing Team	Porsche Cayman	441	(Germany) Florian Discher	8
(Germany) Plusline Racing Team	Porsche Cayman	441	(Germany) Norman Öhlschläger	8
	Porsche Cayman	443	(Germany) Sebastian Freymuth	3–4
	Porsche Cayman	443	(Germany) Matthias Trinius	3–4
(Germany) Adrenalin Motorsport Team Mainhatten Wheels	Porsche Cayman	444	(Germany) Daniel Korn	1–8
(Germany) Adrenalin Motorsport Team Mainhatten Wheels	Porsche Cayman	444	(Germany) Tobias Korn	1–8
(Germany) Adrenalin Motorsport Team Mainhatten Wheels	Porsche Cayman	444	(Germany) Ulrich Korn	1–8
(Germany) Adrenalin Motorsport Team Mainhatten Wheels	Porsche Cayman	444	(Hungary) Adam Benko	6
(Germany) MSC Adenau e.V. im ADAC	Porsche Cayman	445	(Germany) Holger Gachot	5, 7
(Germany) MSC Adenau e.V. im ADAC	Porsche Cayman	445	(Germany) Philip Ade	5
(Germany) MSC Adenau e.V. im ADAC	Porsche Cayman	445	(Germany) Georg Arbinger	7
(Germany) MSC Adenau e.V. im ADAC	Porsche Cayman	445	(Germany) Jérôme Larbi	7
	Porsche Cayman	446	(Germany) Stefan Gaukler	3–4
	Porsche Cayman	446	(Germany) Marcel Haas	3–4
	Porsche Cayman	446	(Germany) Jacek Pydys	3–4
	Porsche Cayman	446	(Germany) Benedikt Höpfer	3
(Germany) SRS Team Sorg Rennsport	Porsche Cayman	447	(Germany) Christian Knötschke	7
(Germany) SRS Team Sorg Rennsport	Porsche Cayman	447	(Germany) Alexander Müller	7
(Germany) SRS Team Sorg Rennsport	Porsche Cayman	447	(Germany) Jan Weber	7
(Germany) AVIA W&S Motorsport	Porsche Cayman	450	(Germany) Peter Siebert	3–5
(Germany) AVIA W&S Motorsport	Porsche Cayman	450	(Germany) Andreas Müller	3–4
(Germany) AVIA W&S Motorsport	Porsche Cayman	450	(Germany) Oliver Kunz	5–6
(Germany) AVIA W&S Motorsport	Porsche Cayman	450	(Germany) Markus Lönnroth	5–6
(Germany) AVIA W&S Motorsport	Porsche Cayman	450	(Bulgaria) Stefan Bostandjiev	6
(Germany) MSC Kempenich e.V. im ADAC	Porsche Cayman	455	(Sweden) Tommy Gräberg	1–2
(Germany) MSC Kempenich e.V. im ADAC	Porsche Cayman	455	(Germany) Robert Neumann	1, 6
(Germany) MSC Kempenich e.V. im ADAC	Porsche Cayman	455	(Germany) Matthias Trinius	6–7
(Germany) MSC Kempenich e.V. im ADAC	Porsche Cayman	455	(Germany) Stefan Gaukler	6
(Germany) MSC Kempenich e.V. im ADAC	Porsche Cayman	455	(Germany) André Gehring	6
(Germany) MSC Kempenich e.V. im ADAC	Porsche Cayman	455	(Sweden) Peter Baumann	7
(Germany) MSC Kempenich e.V. im ADAC	Porsche Cayman	455	(Germany) Florian Discher	7
V4
	BMW 325i	700; 702	(Germany) Oliver Frisse	1–2, 5–6
	BMW 325i	700; 702	(Germany) Jürgen Huber	1–2, 5–6
	BMW 325i	700; 702	(Germany) Simon Sagmeister	1–2, 5–6
	BMW 325i	700; 702	(Germany) Stephan Köpple	6
	BMW 325i	701; 711	(Germany) Desiree Müller	1–8
	BMW 325i	701; 711	(Germany) Tim Lukas Müller	1–8
	BMW 325i	701; 711	(Germany) Sebastian Ławniczek	3–4
	BMW 325i	701; 711	(Austria) Michael Fischer	5
	BMW 325i	701; 711	(Germany) Stefan Schäfer	6
	BMW 325i	701; 711	(Germany) Moritz Rosenbach	7
	BMW 325i	701; 711	(Germany) Michael Schrey	8
	BMW 325i	702	(Germany) Florian Altschaffel	6
	BMW 325i	702	(Germany) Jonas Krause	6
	BMW 325i	702	(Germany) Edouard Martin	6
(Germany) Keeevin Sports and Racing	BMW 325i	703; 750	(Sweden) Dan Berghult	1–8
(Germany) Keeevin Sports and Racing	BMW 325i	703; 750	(Brazil) Flavia Pellegrino Fernandes	1–8
(Germany) Keeevin Sports and Racing	BMW 325i	703; 750	(Finland) Juha Miettinen	1–8
(Germany) Keeevin Sports and Racing	BMW 325i	755	(Germany) Jörg Schauer	5, 8
(Germany) Keeevin Sports and Racing	BMW 325i	755	(Germany) Jens Schneider	5, 8
(Germany) Keeevin Sports and Racing	BMW 325i	755	(Germany) Robin Reimer	5
	BMW 325i	710	(Germany) Leon Braun	5–6
	BMW 325i	710	(Germany) Christopher Gruber	6–7
	BMW 325i	710	(Germany) Marko Schmitz	6–7
	BMW 325i	710	(Germany) Moritz Rosenbach	5, 8
	BMW 325i	710	(Germany) Karsten Welker	5
	BMW 325i	710	(Germany) Nils Renken	6
	BMW 325i	710	(Germany) Heiko Weckenbrock	7
	BMW 325i	710	(Germany) Constantin Ernst	8
	BMW 325i	710	(Germany) Michael Schrey	8
(Germany) Adrenalin Motorsport Team Mainhatten Wheels	BMW 325i	711	(Germany) Danny Brink	6
(Germany) Adrenalin Motorsport Team Mainhatten Wheels	BMW 325i	711	(United Kingdom) Toby Goodman	6
(Germany) Adrenalin Motorsport Team Mainhatten Wheels	BMW 325i	711	(Germany) Sven Markert	6
(Germany) Adrenalin Motorsport Team Mainhatten Wheels	BMW 325i	711	(Switzerland) Ranko Mijatovic	6
	BMW 325i	721	(Germany) Manfred Schmitz	5–7
	BMW 325i	721	(Germany) Reiner Thomas	5–7
	BMW 325i	721	(Germany) Katja Thomas	6
(Germany) Plusline Racing Team	BMW 390L	730	(Germany) Stefan Schäfer	1–2, 5
(Germany) Plusline Racing Team	BMW 390L	730	(Germany) Richard Gresek	1–2
(Germany) Plusline Racing Team	BMW 390L	730	(Germany) Dennis Surace	1–2
(Germany) Plusline Racing Team	BMW 390L	730	(Germany) Phillip Gresek	5
	BMW 325i	731	(Germany) Florian Kramer	3–8
	BMW 325i	731	(Germany) Romano Schultz	3–8
(United States) Rockstar Games By Viken Motorsport	BMW 325i	747	(Germany) Markus Löw	1–4, 8
(United States) Rockstar Games By Viken Motorsport	BMW 325i	747	(United Kingdom) Benjamin Lyons	1–4, 8
(United States) Rockstar Games By Viken Motorsport	BMW 325i	747	(Canada) James Britnell	8
(Germany) MSC Kempenich e.V. im ADAC	BMW E90	750	(Germany) Falk Guddat	6
(Germany) MSC Kempenich e.V. im ADAC	BMW E90	750	(Germany) Anke Lawenstein	6
(Germany) MSC Kempenich e.V. im ADAC	BMW E90	750	(Germany) Sebastian Radermacher	6
VT3
(Germany) Keeevin Sports and Racing	BMW F30 335i	460	(Germany) Valentin Lachenmayer	6–7
(Germany) Keeevin Sports and Racing	BMW F30 335i	460	(Germany) Zoran Radulovic	6–7
(Germany) Keeevin Sports and Racing	BMW F30 335i	460	(United Kingdom) Alex Wright	7–8
(Germany) Keeevin Sports and Racing	BMW F30 335i	460	(Switzerland) Fabien Herrscher	5
(Germany) Keeevin Sports and Racing	BMW F30 335i	460	(Germany) Serge van Vooren	5
(Germany) Keeevin Sports and Racing	BMW F30 335i	460	(Germany) Jörg Schönfelder	6
(Germany) Keeevin Sports and Racing	BMW F30 335i	460	(Switzerland) Guido Wirtz	6
(Germany) Keeevin Sports and Racing	BMW F30 335i	460	(Germany) Marco Schmitz	8
	BMW M2	461	(Switzerland) Dominic Kulpowicz	1–2, 7–8
	BMW M2	461	(Germany) Sebastian Tauber	1–2, 7–8
VT2-FWD
(Germany) Walkenhorst Motorsport	Hyundai i30N	466	(Monaco) Micah Stanley	1–4
(Germany) Walkenhorst Motorsport	Hyundai i30N	466	(United Kingdom) Joseph Warhurst	1–3
(Germany) Walkenhorst Motorsport	Hyundai i30N	466	(United Kingdom) Tom Edgar	2, 5
(Germany) Walkenhorst Motorsport	Hyundai i30N	466	(France) Jean-Christophe David	3–4
(Germany) Walkenhorst Motorsport	Hyundai i30N	466	(United Kingdom) Alex Connor	5–6
(Germany) Walkenhorst Motorsport	Hyundai i30N	466	(United Kingdom) Edward McDermott	7–8
(Germany) Walkenhorst Motorsport	Hyundai i30N	466	(United Kingdom) Jack Aitken	1
(Germany) Walkenhorst Motorsport	Hyundai i30N	466	(Germany) Bennet Ehrl	5
(Germany) Walkenhorst Motorsport	Hyundai i30N	466	(United Kingdom) Ben Barker	6
(Germany) Walkenhorst Motorsport	Hyundai i30N	466	(United Kingdom) Andy Priaulx	6
(Germany) Walkenhorst Motorsport	Hyundai i30N	466	(United Kingdom) Sebastian Priaulx	6
(Germany) Walkenhorst Motorsport	Hyundai i30N	466	(United Kingdom) Michael Broadhurst	7
(Germany) Walkenhorst Motorsport	Hyundai i30N	466	(Netherlands) Mex Jansen	7
(Germany) Walkenhorst Motorsport	Hyundai i30N	466	(United Kingdom) Dexter Patterson	8
(Germany) Walkenhorst Motorsport	Hyundai i30N	466	(United Kingdom) Matthew Robert Topham	8
	Hyundai i30N	467	(Germany) Mario Fuchs	5, 7
	Hyundai i30N	467	(Germany) Christian Scherer	5, 8
	Hyundai i30N	467	(Germany) Gerrit Holthaus	7–8
(Germany) Auto Thomas by Jung Motorsport	Cupra Leon KL	469	(Germany) Tobias Jung	1–2, 5
(Germany) Auto Thomas by Jung Motorsport	Cupra Leon KL	469	(Germany) Lars Füting	5, 7–8
(Germany) Auto Thomas by Jung Motorsport	Cupra Leon KL	469	(Germany) Michael Eichhorn	1–2
(Germany) Auto Thomas by Jung Motorsport	Cupra Leon KL	469	(Germany) Tim Robertz	5
(Germany) Auto Thomas by Jung Motorsport	Cupra Leon KL	469	(Germany) Marc Etzkorn	7
(Germany) Auto Thomas by Jung Motorsport	Cupra Leon KL	469	(Germany) Volker Kühn	7
(Germany) Auto Thomas by Jung Motorsport	Cupra Leon KL	469	(Germany) Giancarlo-Gino Lührs	7
(Germany) Auto Thomas by Jung Motorsport	Cupra Leon KL	469	(Germany) Jannik Reinhard	8
(Germany) Auto Thomas by Jung Motorsport	Cupra Leon KL	469	(Germany) Christoph Schmitz	8
(Germany) Auto Thomas by Jung Motorsport	Cupra Leon KL	469	(Germany) Marcel Unland	8
(Germany) Auto Thomas by Jung Motorsport	Cupra Leon KL	470	(Germany) Tobias Jung	1, 5, 7–8
(Germany) Auto Thomas by Jung Motorsport	Cupra Leon KL	470	(Germany) Michael Eichhorn	5, 7–8
(Germany) Auto Thomas by Jung Motorsport	Cupra Leon KL	470	(Germany) Andreas Winterwerber	5, 7–8
(Germany) Auto Thomas by Jung Motorsport	Cupra Leon KL	470	(Germany) Lars Füting	1
(Germany) Auto Thomas by Jung Motorsport	Cupra Leon KL	470	(Germany) Giancarlo-Gino Lührs	1
(Germany) Auto Thomas by Jung Motorsport	Cupra Leon KL	470	(Germany) Tim Robertz	1
(Germany) Auto Thomas by Jung Motorsport	Cupra Leon KL	495	(Germany) Michael Eichhorn	3–4
(Germany) Auto Thomas by Jung Motorsport	Cupra Leon KL	495	(Germany) Tobias Jung	3–4
(Germany) Auto Thomas by Jung Motorsport	Cupra Leon KL	495	(Germany) Andreas Winterwerber	3–4
	Volkswagen Scirocco	475	(Germany) Georg Kiefer	6
	Volkswagen Scirocco	475	(Germany) Kevin Olaf Rost	6
	Volkswagen Scirocco	475	(Germany) Olaf Rost	6
(Germany) AC 1927 Mayen e.V. im ADAC	Volkswagen Scirocco R-SR	476	(Germany) Timo Beuth	1–3
(Germany) AC 1927 Mayen e.V. im ADAC	Volkswagen Scirocco R-SR	476	(Germany) Danny Brink	1–3
(Germany) AC 1927 Mayen e.V. im ADAC	Volkswagen Scirocco R-SR	476	(Germany) Joachim Nett	1–3
(Germany) AC 1927 Mayen e.V. im ADAC	Volkswagen Scirocco R-SR	476	(Germany) Jürgen Nett	1–3
(Germany) MSC Kempenich e.V. im ADAC	Volkswagen Scirocco R TSI	477	(Switzerland) Thomas Alpiger	3–4
(Germany) MSC Kempenich e.V. im ADAC	Volkswagen Scirocco R TSI	477	(Germany) Christian Koger	3–4
(Germany) MSC Kempenich e.V. im ADAC	Volkswagen Scirocco R TSI	477	(Germany) Maik Knappmeier	3
(Germany) MSC Kempenich e.V. im ADAC	Volkswagen Scirocco R TSI	477	(Germany) Henrik Seibel	4
(Germany) MSC Kempenich e.V. im ADAC	Volkswagen Scirocco	480	(Germany) Christian Koger	1–2, 5–6
(Germany) MSC Kempenich e.V. im ADAC	Volkswagen Scirocco	480	(Switzerland) Thomas Alpiger	1–2, 6
(Germany) MSC Kempenich e.V. im ADAC	Volkswagen Scirocco	480	(Germany) Henrik Seibel	5–6
(Germany) MSC Kempenich e.V. im ADAC	Volkswagen Scirocco	480	(Germany) Bastian Arend	1
(Germany) MSC Kempenich e.V. im ADAC	Volkswagen Scirocco	480	(Germany) Martin Heidrich	2
(Germany) MSC Kempenich e.V. im ADAC	Volkswagen Scirocco	480	(Germany) Robert Neumann	7
(Germany) MSC Kempenich e.V. im ADAC	Volkswagen Scirocco	480	(Germany) Lutz Obermann	7
(Germany) MSC Kempenich e.V. im ADAC	Volkswagen Scirocco	480	(Germany) Hans-Joachim Rabe	7
(South Korea) Hyundai Driving Experience	Hyundai i30N Fastback	486	(South Korea) Gyumin Kim	1–3
(South Korea) Hyundai Driving Experience	Hyundai i30N Fastback	486	(China) Zhendong Zhang	1–2
(South Korea) Hyundai Driving Experience	Hyundai i30N Fastback	486	(Canada) Mark Wilkins	2
(South Korea) Hyundai Driving Experience	Hyundai i30N Fastback	486	(Germany) Jens Dralle	3
(South Korea) Hyundai Driving Experience	Hyundai i30N Fastback	486	(United States) Jeff Ricca	3
(South Korea) Hyundai Driving Experience	Hyundai i30N Fastback	486	(Germany) Marcus Willhardt	3
(South Korea) Hyundai Driving Experience	Hyundai i30N Fastback	487	(China) Hongwei Cao	1–2
(South Korea) Hyundai Driving Experience	Hyundai i30N Fastback	487	(South Korea) Gyumin Kim	1–2
(South Korea) Hyundai Driving Experience	Hyundai i30N Fastback	487	(Canada) Mark Wilkins	2
(Germany) SRS Team Sorg Rennsport	BMW 128ti	488	(Austria) Johannes Dujsik	1–2
(Germany) SRS Team Sorg Rennsport	BMW 128ti	488	(Germany) Henning Eschweiler	1–2
(Germany) SRS Team Sorg Rennsport	BMW 128ti	488	(Germany) Christoph Krombach	1–2
(Germany) SRS Team Sorg Rennsport	BMW 128ti	488	(Germany) Stefan Ertl	8
(Germany) SRS Team Sorg Rennsport	BMW 128ti	488	(Germany) Fabian Peitzmeier	8
(Germany) SRS Team Sorg Rennsport	BMW 128ti	488	(Japan) Masato Mitsuhashi	8
(Germany) Keeevin Sports and Racing	Renault Mégane III RS	489	(Poland) Rafał Gieras	1–2
(Germany) Keeevin Sports and Racing	Renault Mégane III RS	489	(Germany) Daniel Sowada	1–2
(Germany) Keeevin Sports and Racing	Hyundai i30N	499	(Germany) Pascal Fritzsche	1–5
(Germany) Keeevin Sports and Racing	Hyundai i30N	499	(Germany) Thomas Schönfeld	1–5
(Germany) Mertens Motorsport	Hyundai i30N	491	(United Kingdom) Joshua Hislop	1–8
(Germany) Mertens Motorsport	Hyundai i30N	491	(Germany) Daniel Mertens	1–8
(Germany) Mertens Motorsport	Hyundai i30N	491	(Germany) Christian Alexander Dannesberger	5
(Germany) Mertens Motorsport	Hyundai i30N	491	(United States) Jeff Ricca	6
(Germany) Mertens Motorsport	Hyundai i30N	492	(India) Akshay Gupta	1–8
(Germany) Mertens Motorsport	Hyundai i30N	492	(Germany) Alex Georg Schneider	1–8
(Germany) Mertens Motorsport	Hyundai i30N	492	(Germany) Niklas Walter	1–5
(Germany) Mertens Motorsport	Hyundai i30N	493	(Germany) Carsten Erpenbach	3–4
(Germany) Mertens Motorsport	Hyundai i30N	493	(Germany) Ralf Peter Wiesner	3–4
(Germany) Mertens Motorsport	Hyundai i30N	496	(Germany) Ralf Peter Wiesner	5–8
(Germany) Mertens Motorsport	Hyundai i30N	496	(Germany) Carsten Erpenbach	6–7
(Germany) Mertens Motorsport	Hyundai i30N	496	(Germany) Daniel Mertens	5
(Germany) Mertens Motorsport	Hyundai i30N	496	(United Kingdom) Joshua Hislop	8
(Germany) Mertens Motorsport	Hyundai i30N Fastback	496	(Germany) Carsten Erpenbach	1–2
(Germany) Mertens Motorsport	Hyundai i30N Fastback	496	(Germany) Ralf Peter Wiesner	1–2
	Volkswagen Golf 8 GTI Clubsport	494	(Germany) Pascal Otto Fritzsche	7–8
	Volkswagen Golf 8 GTI Clubsport	494	(Germany) Thomas Schönfeld	7–8
VT2-R+4WD
(Germany) Adrenalin Motorsport Team Mainhatten Wheels	BMW 330i Racing (2020)	1; 500	(Israel) Moran Gott	1–8
(Germany) Adrenalin Motorsport Team Mainhatten Wheels	BMW 330i Racing (2020)	1; 500	(Germany) Philipp Leisen	1–8
(Germany) Adrenalin Motorsport Team Mainhatten Wheels	BMW 330i Racing (2020)	1; 500	(Germany) Daniel Zils	1–8
(Germany) Adrenalin Motorsport Team Mainhatten Wheels	BMW 330i Racing (2020)	501	(Germany) "Sub7BTG"	1–4, 6–7
(Germany) Adrenalin Motorsport Team Mainhatten Wheels	BMW 330i Racing (2020)	501	(France) Leo Messenger	1–4
(Germany) Adrenalin Motorsport Team Mainhatten Wheels	BMW 330i Racing (2020)	501	(United States) Zack Moore	3–4
(Germany) Adrenalin Motorsport Team Mainhatten Wheels	BMW 330i Racing (2020)	501	(Germany) Valentino Catalano	6–7
(Germany) Adrenalin Motorsport Team Mainhatten Wheels	BMW 330i Racing (2020)	501	(Israel) Hagay Farran	6, 8
(Germany) Adrenalin Motorsport Team Mainhatten Wheels	BMW 330i Racing (2020)	501	(Germany) Julius Thommel	6
(Germany) Adrenalin Motorsport Team Mainhatten Wheels	BMW 330i Racing (2020)	501	(Czech Republic) Martin Bus	7
(Germany) Adrenalin Motorsport Team Mainhatten Wheels	BMW 330i Racing (2020)	501	(United Kingdom) Farquini Deott	8
(Singapore) Giti Tire Motorsport by WS Racing	BMW 328i Racing ^{1–2, 5–6} BMW 330i Racing (2020) ^{3–4}	502	(Germany) Maximilian Eisberg	1–2, 5
(Singapore) Giti Tire Motorsport by WS Racing	BMW 328i Racing ^{1–2, 5–6} BMW 330i Racing (2020) ^{3–4}	502	(France) Gregoire Boutonnet	3–5
(Singapore) Giti Tire Motorsport by WS Racing	BMW 328i Racing ^{1–2, 5–6} BMW 330i Racing (2020) ^{3–4}	502	(Latvia) Patricija Stalidzane	1–2
(Singapore) Giti Tire Motorsport by WS Racing	BMW 328i Racing ^{1–2, 5–6} BMW 330i Racing (2020) ^{3–4}	502	(Germany) Maximilian Paul	1–2
(Singapore) Giti Tire Motorsport by WS Racing	BMW 328i Racing ^{1–2, 5–6} BMW 330i Racing (2020) ^{3–4}	502	(Germany) Maximilian Eisberg	3–4
(Singapore) Giti Tire Motorsport by WS Racing	BMW 328i Racing ^{1–2, 5–6} BMW 330i Racing (2020) ^{3–4}	502	(Germany) Lorenz Stegmann	3–4
(Singapore) Giti Tire Motorsport by WS Racing	BMW 328i Racing ^{1–2, 5–6} BMW 330i Racing (2020) ^{3–4}	502	(Germany) Finn Mache	6–7
(Singapore) Giti Tire Motorsport by WS Racing	BMW 328i Racing ^{1–2, 5–6} BMW 330i Racing (2020) ^{3–4}	502	(Germany) Fabian Pirrone	6–7
(Singapore) Giti Tire Motorsport by WS Racing	BMW 328i Racing ^{1–2, 5–6} BMW 330i Racing (2020) ^{3–4}	502	(France) Laurent Laparra	5
(Singapore) Giti Tire Motorsport by WS Racing	BMW 328i Racing ^{1–2, 5–6} BMW 330i Racing (2020) ^{3–4}	502	(Germany) Jan von Kiedrowski	6
(Singapore) Giti Tire Motorsport by WS Racing	BMW 328i Racing ^{1–2, 5–6} BMW 330i Racing (2020) ^{3–4}	502	(Germany) Jan Ullrich	6
(Singapore) Giti Tire Motorsport by WS Racing	BMW 328i Racing ^{1–2, 5–6} BMW 330i Racing (2020) ^{3–4}	502	(Hong Kong) Samuel Hsieh	7
(Singapore) Giti Tire Motorsport by WS Racing	BMW 330i Racing (2020)	506	(Germany) Niklas Ehrhardt	1–2, 7
(Singapore) Giti Tire Motorsport by WS Racing	BMW 330i Racing (2020)	506	(Germany) Thomas Ehrhardt	1–2, 7
(Singapore) Giti Tire Motorsport by WS Racing	BMW 330i Racing (2020)	506	(Germany) Janina Schall	1–2
(Singapore) Giti Tire Motorsport by WS Racing	BMW 330i Racing (2020)	506	(Germany) Joe Bohnes	3–4
(Singapore) Giti Tire Motorsport by WS Racing	BMW 330i Racing (2020)	506	(Germany) Lukas Drost	3–4
(Singapore) Giti Tire Motorsport by WS Racing	BMW 330i Racing (2020)	506	(Germany) Luisa Kahler	6–7
(Singapore) Giti Tire Motorsport by WS Racing	BMW 330i Racing (2020)	506	(Germany) Julian Reeh	3
(Singapore) Giti Tire Motorsport by WS Racing	BMW 330i Racing (2020)	506	(Germany) Bernd Küpper	4
(Singapore) Giti Tire Motorsport by WS Racing	BMW 330i Racing (2020)	506	(Germany) Daniel Hassel	5
(Singapore) Giti Tire Motorsport by WS Racing	BMW 330i Racing (2020)	506	(Germany) Christoph Merkt	5
(Singapore) Giti Tire Motorsport by WS Racing	BMW 330i Racing (2020)	506	(Germany) Sascha Steinhardt	5
(Singapore) Giti Tire Motorsport by WS Racing	BMW 330i Racing (2020)	506	(Germany) Raphael Klingmann	6
(Singapore) Giti Tire Motorsport by WS Racing	BMW 330i Racing (2020)	506	(Japan) Masato Mitsuhashi	6
(Singapore) Giti Tire Motorsport by WS Racing	BMW 125i Racing	507	(Germany) Robert Hinzer	1–2
(Singapore) Giti Tire Motorsport by WS Racing	BMW 125i Racing	507	(Germany) Fabian Pirrone	1–2
(Singapore) Giti Tire Motorsport by WS Racing	BMW 125i Racing	507	(Germany) Jan Ullrich	1
(Singapore) Giti Tire Motorsport by WS Racing	BMW 125i Racing	507	(Germany) Matthias Möller	2
(Germany) Black Falcon	BMW 330i Racing (2020)	503	(United States) Ryan Harrison	1–2
(Germany) Black Falcon	BMW 330i Racing (2020)	503	(United States) William Wachs	1–2
(Germany) SRS Team Sorg Rennsport	BMW 330i Racing (2020)	504	(Netherlands) Piet-Jan Ooms	1–8
(Germany) SRS Team Sorg Rennsport	BMW 330i Racing (2020)	504	(Germany) Mathias Baar	3–4, 7
(Germany) SRS Team Sorg Rennsport	BMW 330i Racing (2020)	504	(Germany) Kurt Strube	3, 5–6
(Germany) SRS Team Sorg Rennsport	BMW 330i Racing (2020)	504	(United States) Daniel Bloom	1–2
(Germany) SRS Team Sorg Rennsport	BMW 330i Racing (2020)	504	(United States) Alec Udell	1–2
(Germany) SRS Team Sorg Rennsport	BMW 330i Racing (2020)	504	(Germany) Hans Joachim Theiß	3–4
(Germany) SRS Team Sorg Rennsport	BMW 330i Racing (2020)	504	(Lithuania) Kasparas Vingilis	5–6
(Germany) SRS Team Sorg Rennsport	BMW 330i Racing (2020)	504	(Germany) Mika Nickelsen	7–8
(Germany) SRS Team Sorg Rennsport	BMW 330i Racing (2020)	504	(Italy) Francesco Bugane	6
(Germany) SRS Team Sorg Rennsport	BMW 330i Racing (2020)	514	(Germany) Christian Coen	3–4
(Germany) SRS Team Sorg Rennsport	BMW 330i Racing (2020)	514	(Germany) Niklas Karlus	3–4
(Germany) SRS Team Sorg Rennsport	BMW 330i Racing (2020)	514	(Germany) Jan-Niklas Stieler	3–4
(Germany) SRS Team Sorg Rennsport	BMW 330i Racing (2020)	514	(Belgium) Tim Peeters	6–7
(Germany) SRS Team Sorg Rennsport	BMW 330i Racing (2020)	514	(Italy) Ugo Vicenzi	6, 8
(Germany) SRS Team Sorg Rennsport	BMW 330i Racing (2020)	514	(China) Kuang Can Wei	5
(Germany) SRS Team Sorg Rennsport	BMW 330i Racing (2020)	514	(China) Luo Haowen	5
(Germany) SRS Team Sorg Rennsport	BMW 330i Racing (2020)	514	(South Korea) An Jeong-min	6
(Germany) SRS Team Sorg Rennsport	BMW 330i Racing (2020)	514	(Germany) Philipp Beyerle	6
(Germany) SRS Team Sorg Rennsport	BMW 330i Racing (2020)	514	(Switzerland) Peter Haener	7
(Germany) SRS Team Sorg Rennsport	BMW 330i Racing (2020)	514	(United States) Johnny Huang	7
(Germany) SRS Team Sorg Rennsport	BMW 330i Racing (2020)	514	(Germany) Lars Duckek	8
(Germany) SRS Team Sorg Rennsport	BMW 330i Racing (2020)	514	(Italy) Alberto Carobbio	8
	BMW 328i	505	(Germany) Fabian Tillmann	1–3, 5–7
	BMW 328i	505	(Germany) Michael Wolpertinger	1–3, 5–7
	BMW 328i	505	(Denmark) Kaj Schubert	1–3, 5–6
	BMW 328i	505	(Poland) Sebastian Ławniczek	1–2
	BMW 328i	505	(Germany) Fritz Hebig	6
	BMW 328i	505	(Albania) Boris Hrubesch	7
	BMW 328i	505	(Netherlands) Lars van 't Veer	7
(Germany) MSC Adenau e.V. im ADAC	BMW F30	508	(Germany) Beat Schmitz Sr.	5–8
(Germany) MSC Adenau e.V. im ADAC	BMW F30	508	(Germany) Andre Sommerberg	5–8
(Germany) MSC Adenau e.V. im ADAC	BMW F30	508	(Germany) Christian Koch	6–7
(Germany) MSC Adenau e.V. im ADAC	BMW F30	508	(Germany) Andreas Pöschko	5
(Germany) MSC Adenau e.V. im ADAC	BMW F30	508	(Germany) Sascha Korte	6
(Japan) Toyota Gazoo Racing WRT CR	Toyota GR Yaris	509	(Netherlands) Herwig Daenens	1–2
(Japan) Toyota Gazoo Racing WRT CR	Toyota GR Yaris	509	(Finland) Jari-Matti Latvala	1–2
(Japan) Toyota Gazoo Racing WRT CR	Toyota GR Yaris	509	(Germany) Uwe Kleen	1–2
(Germany) Dupré Engineering	Audi S3	510	(Germany) Christoph Dupré	1–5, 7
(Germany) Dupré Engineering	Audi S3	510	(Austria) Maximilian Malinowski	1–4, 7
(Germany) Dupré Engineering	Audi S3	510	(Germany) Jacob Erlbacher	1–2
(Germany) Dupré Engineering	Audi S3	510	(Germany) Jürgen Nett	5, 7
(Germany) Dupré Engineering	Audi S3	510	(Germany) Timo Beuth	5
(Germany) Dupré Engineering	Audi S3	510	(Germany) Joachim Nett	5
(Germany) Dupré Engineering	Audi S3	510	(Germany) Claus Dupré	7
(Germany) Dupré Engineering	Audi S3	511	(Germany) Timo Beuth	5
(Germany) Dupré Engineering	Audi S3	511	(Austria) Maximilian Malinowski	5
	BMW 330i Racing	512	(Germany) Yannick Bieniek	6
	BMW 330i Racing	512	(Germany) Andreas Müller	6
	BMW 330i Racing	512	(Germany) Florian Quante	6
	BMW 330i Racing (2020)	513; 268	(Japan) Masato Mitsuhashi	3–5, 7
	BMW 330i Racing (2020)	513; 268	(Japan) Takashi Ito	3–4, 8
	BMW 330i Racing (2020)	513; 268	(Malaysia) Chong Kiat Wai	3–4
	BMW 330i Racing (2020)	513; 268	(Japan) Ryusuke Masumoto	5, 7
	BMW 330i Racing (2020)	513; 268	(Japan) Kohta Kawaai	5, 8
(Germany) Manheller Racing	Toyota Supra	515	(Germany) Harald Barth	5–8
(Germany) Manheller Racing	Toyota Supra	515	(Germany) Markus Schiller	5–6
(Germany) Manheller Racing	Toyota Supra	515	(Germany) Marcel Manheller	5, 7–8
(Germany) Manheller Racing	Toyota Supra	515	(Germany) Andreas Pöschko	6
(Germany) Manheller Racing	Toyota Supra	515	(Japan) Yutaka Seki	6
(Germany) Walkenhorst Motorsport	BMW 125i Racing	518	(United Kingdom) Ben Barker	7
(Germany) Walkenhorst Motorsport	BMW 125i Racing	518	(United Kingdom) Andy Priaulx	7
(Germany) Walkenhorst Motorsport	BMW 125i Racing	518	(United Kingdom) Sebastian Priaulx	7
(Germany) Walkenhorst Motorsport	BMW 125i Racing	518	(Netherlands) Mex Jansen	8
(Germany) Walkenhorst Motorsport	BMW 125i Racing	518	(Switzerland) Fabio Scherer	8
(Japan) Team HAL	Toyota Supra	519	(Japan) Masaaki Hatano	5–8
(Japan) Team HAL	Toyota Supra	519	(Japan) Tohjiro Azuma	5–6, 8
(Japan) Team HAL	Toyota Supra	519	(Japan) Kouji Obara	6, 8
(Japan) Team HAL	Toyota Supra	519	(Japan) Masahiro Sasaki	7
(Germany) Toyo Tires with Ring Racing	Toyota Supra	520	(Germany) Matthias Röss	1–2, 5–8
(Germany) Toyo Tires with Ring Racing	Toyota Supra	520	(Germany) Matle Tack	1–2, 5–8
(Germany) Toyo Tires with Ring Racing	Toyota Supra	520	(Germany) Manfred Röss	1–2, 5–8

==== Cup Class ====
Team	Car	No.	Drivers	Rounds
BMW M240i
(Germany) Adrenalin Motorsport Team Mainhatten Wheels	BMW M240i Racing Cup	650	(United Kingdom) Toby Goodman	1–5, 7–8
(Germany) Adrenalin Motorsport Team Mainhatten Wheels	BMW M240i Racing Cup	650	(Germany) Sven Markert	1–5, 7–8
(Germany) Adrenalin Motorsport Team Mainhatten Wheels	BMW M240i Racing Cup	650	(Switzerland) Ranko Mijatovic	1–4, 7–8
(Germany) Adrenalin Motorsport Team Mainhatten Wheels	BMW M240i Racing Cup	650	(Germany) Danny Brink	5
(Germany) Adrenalin Motorsport Team Mainhatten Wheels	BMW M240i Racing Cup	650	(Argentina) Alejandro Walter Chahwan	6
(Germany) Adrenalin Motorsport Team Mainhatten Wheels	BMW M240i Racing Cup	650	(Argentina) Federico Braga	6
(Germany) Adrenalin Motorsport Team Mainhatten Wheels	BMW M240i Racing Cup	651	(Germany) Yannik Himmels	1–8
(Germany) Adrenalin Motorsport Team Mainhatten Wheels	BMW M240i Racing Cup	651	(United States) Nico Silva	1–8
(Germany) Adrenalin Motorsport Team Mainhatten Wheels	BMW M240i Racing Cup	651	(Germany) Marvin Marino	1–4
(Germany) Adrenalin Motorsport Team Mainhatten Wheels	BMW M240i Racing Cup	651	(Germany) Michel Albers	6–8
(Germany) Adrenalin Motorsport Team Mainhatten Wheels	BMW M240i Racing Cup	651	(United Kingdom) Will Hunt	6
(Germany) Adrenalin Motorsport Team Mainhatten Wheels	BMW M240i Racing Cup	652	(Germany) Lars Harbeck	1–8
(Germany) Adrenalin Motorsport Team Mainhatten Wheels	BMW M240i Racing Cup	652	(Germany) Klaus Faßbender	1–4, 6–7
(Germany) Adrenalin Motorsport Team Mainhatten Wheels	BMW M240i Racing Cup	652	(Germany) Christian Kraus	5–8
(Germany) Adrenalin Motorsport Team Mainhatten Wheels	BMW M240i Racing Cup	652	(Germany) Nick Deißler	1–2
(Germany) Adrenalin Motorsport Team Mainhatten Wheels	BMW M240i Racing Cup	652	(South Africa) Leyton Fourie	3–4
(Germany) Adrenalin Motorsport Team Mainhatten Wheels	BMW M240i Racing Cup	652	(Germany) Andre Duve	6
(Germany) Adrenalin Motorsport Team Mainhatten Wheels	BMW M240i Racing Cup	652	(Germany) Matthias Beckwermert	8
(Germany) Adrenalin Motorsport Team Mainhatten Wheels	BMW M240i Racing Cup	652	(Germany) Danny Brink	8
(Germany) Adrenalin Motorsport Team Mainhatten Wheels	BMW M240i Racing Cup	653	(Germany) Michel Albers	1–2
(Germany) Adrenalin Motorsport Team Mainhatten Wheels	BMW M240i Racing Cup	653	(Chile) Benjamin Hites	1–2
(Germany) Adrenalin Motorsport Team Mainhatten Wheels	BMW M240i Racing Cup	653	(Kazakhstan) Marat Khayrov	1–2
(Germany) Adrenalin Motorsport Team Mainhatten Wheels	BMW M240i Racing Cup	653	(Germany) Rudolf Brandl	3–4
(Germany) Adrenalin Motorsport Team Mainhatten Wheels	BMW M240i Racing Cup	653	(Germany) Sebastian Brandl	3–4
(Germany) Adrenalin Motorsport Team Mainhatten Wheels	BMW M240i Racing Cup	653	(Germany) Ferdinand Wernet	3–4
(Germany) Adrenalin Motorsport Team Mainhatten Wheels	BMW M240i Racing Cup	653	(Ukraine) Leonid Petrov	5, 8
(Germany) Adrenalin Motorsport Team Mainhatten Wheels	BMW M240i Racing Cup	653	(United States) Andrie Hartanto	5
(Germany) Adrenalin Motorsport Team Mainhatten Wheels	BMW M240i Racing Cup	653	(United States) Judson Holt	6
(Germany) Adrenalin Motorsport Team Mainhatten Wheels	BMW M240i Racing Cup	653	(United States) Joshua Jacobs	6
(Germany) Adrenalin Motorsport Team Mainhatten Wheels	BMW M240i Racing Cup	653	(United States) Denny Stripling	6
(Germany) Adrenalin Motorsport Team Mainhatten Wheels	BMW M240i Racing Cup	653	(China) Kuang Can Wei	7
(Germany) Adrenalin Motorsport Team Mainhatten Wheels	BMW M240i Racing Cup	653	(China) Luo Haowen	7
(Germany) Adrenalin Motorsport Team Mainhatten Wheels	BMW M240i Racing Cup	653	(Germany) Bernd Kleeschulte	8
(Germany) Adrenalin Motorsport Team Mainhatten Wheels	BMW M240i Racing Cup	660	(Germany) Michel Albers	3–4
(Germany) Adrenalin Motorsport Team Mainhatten Wheels	BMW M240i Racing Cup	660	(Germany) Christoph Merkt	3–4
(Germany) Adrenalin Motorsport Team Mainhatten Wheels	BMW M240i Racing Cup	660	(Germany) Hermann Vortkamp	3–4
(Germany) Adrenalin Motorsport Team Mainhatten Wheels	BMW M240i Racing Cup	662	(Switzerland) Michelangelo Comazzi	3–4
(Germany) Adrenalin Motorsport Team Mainhatten Wheels	BMW M240i Racing Cup	662	(Italy) Rodolfo Funaro	3–4
(Germany) Adrenalin Motorsport Team Mainhatten Wheels	BMW M240i Racing Cup	662	(Germany) Nils Steinberg	3–4
	BMW M240i Racing Cup	658	(Belgium) Hakan Sari	7, 8
	BMW M240i Racing Cup	658	(Belgium) Recep Sari	8
(Germany) Smyrlis Racing	BMW M240i Racing Cup	660	(Germany) Justin-Bruce Wichmann	1–2
(Germany) Smyrlis Racing	BMW M240i Racing Cup	660	(China) Chuang Yan	1–2
(Germany) Smyrlis Racing	BMW M240i Racing Cup	660	(United Kingdom) Jack Aitken	2
(Germany) Smyrlis Racing	BMW M240i Racing Cup	662	(Germany) Alex Koch	2
(Germany) Smyrlis Racing	BMW M240i Racing Cup	662	(Germany) Niklas Koch	2
(Germany) Smyrlis Racing	BMW M240i Racing Cup	662	(Germany) Anton Ruf	2
(Germany) Schnitzelalm Racing	BMW M240i Racing Cup	665	(Brazil) Turvey Stuart	7
(Germany) Schnitzelalm Racing	BMW M240i Racing Cup	665	(Brazil) Riberi Thiago	7
(Germany) Schnitzelalm Racing	BMW M240i Racing Cup	665	(Germany) Kevin Wambach	7
(Germany) MSC Kempenich e.V. im ADAC	BMW M240i Racing Cup	666	(Switzerland) Thomas Alpiger	7
(Germany) MSC Kempenich e.V. im ADAC	BMW M240i Racing Cup	666	(Switzerland) Michael Neuhauser	7
(Germany) MSC Sinzig e.V. im ADAC ^{1–5} (Germany) Up2Race ^{7–8}	BMW M240i Racing Cup	670	(Netherlands) John van der Sanden	8
(Germany) MSC Sinzig e.V. im ADAC ^{1–5} (Germany) Up2Race ^{7–8}	BMW M240i Racing Cup	670	(Germany) Christian Scherer	8
(Germany) MSC Sinzig e.V. im ADAC ^{1–5} (Germany) Up2Race ^{7–8}	BMW M240i Racing Cup	680	(Germany) Jannik Reinhard	1–2, 4–5, 7
(Germany) MSC Sinzig e.V. im ADAC ^{1–5} (Germany) Up2Race ^{7–8}	BMW M240i Racing Cup	680	(Germany) Daniel Dörrschuck	1–2
(Germany) MSC Sinzig e.V. im ADAC ^{1–5} (Germany) Up2Race ^{7–8}	BMW M240i Racing Cup	680	(Germany) Timo Glock	1–2
(Germany) MSC Sinzig e.V. im ADAC ^{1–5} (Germany) Up2Race ^{7–8}	BMW M240i Racing Cup	680	(Germany) Ronny Wechselberger	3–4
(Germany) MSC Sinzig e.V. im ADAC ^{1–5} (Germany) Up2Race ^{7–8}	BMW M240i Racing Cup	680	(Macau) Kevin Tse	3–4
(Germany) MSC Sinzig e.V. im ADAC ^{1–5} (Germany) Up2Race ^{7–8}	BMW M240i Racing Cup	680	(Germany) Kevin Wambach	3
(Germany) MSC Sinzig e.V. im ADAC ^{1–5} (Germany) Up2Race ^{7–8}	BMW M240i Racing Cup	680	(Germany) Daniel Dörrschuck	5
(Germany) MSC Sinzig e.V. im ADAC ^{1–5} (Germany) Up2Race ^{7–8}	BMW M240i Racing Cup	680	(Germany) Finn Wiebelhaus	5
(Germany) MSC Sinzig e.V. im ADAC ^{1–5} (Germany) Up2Race ^{7–8}	BMW M240i Racing Cup	680	(United Kingdom) James Breakell	7
(Germany) MSC Sinzig e.V. im ADAC ^{1–5} (Germany) Up2Race ^{7–8}	BMW M240i Racing Cup	680	(United States) Martin Rich	7
(Germany) MSC Sinzig e.V. im ADAC ^{1–5} (Germany) Up2Race ^{7–8}	BMW M240i Racing Cup	680	(Germany) Patrick Schneider	8
(Germany) Teichmann Racing	BMW M240i Racing Cup	674	(Germany) Pierre Lemmerz	1–2
(Germany) Teichmann Racing	BMW M240i Racing Cup	674	(Germany) David Schumacher	1–2
(Germany) Teichmann Racing	BMW M240i Racing Cup	674	(Germany) JayMo Härtling	1
BMW M2 CS
(Germany) ME Motorsport	BMW M2 ClubSport Racing	882	(Germany) Markus Eichele	8
(Germany) ME Motorsport	BMW M2 ClubSport Racing	882	(Germany) Moritz Wiskirchen	8
(Germany) ME Motorsport	BMW M2 ClubSport Racing	882	(Germany) Philip Wiskirchen	8
(Belgium) Comtoyou Racing	BMW M2 ClubSport Racing	883	(Belgium) Nicolas Baert	8
(Belgium) Comtoyou Racing	BMW M2 ClubSport Racing	883	(Belgium) Matisse Lismont	8
(Switzerland) Hofor Racing by Bonk Motorsport	BMW M2 ClubSport Racing	888; 885	(Switzerland) Martin Kroll	1, 3–6
(Switzerland) Hofor Racing by Bonk Motorsport	BMW M2 ClubSport Racing	888; 885	(Germany) Michael Mayer	3–6
(Switzerland) Hofor Racing by Bonk Motorsport	BMW M2 ClubSport Racing	888; 885	(Germany) Felix Partl	3–4
(Switzerland) Hofor Racing by Bonk Motorsport	BMW M2 ClubSport Racing	888; 885	(Germany) Max Partl	1
(Switzerland) Hofor Racing by Bonk Motorsport	BMW M2 ClubSport Racing	888; 885	(Germany) Michael Schrey	1
(Switzerland) Hofor Racing by Bonk Motorsport	BMW M2 ClubSport Racing	888; 885	(Germany) Rainer Partl	6
	BMW M2 ClubSport Racing	899	(Germany) Alexander Becker	5, 7
	BMW M2 ClubSport Racing	899	(Germany) Thomas Leyherr	5, 7

==== Gruppe H historic cars ====
Team	Car	No.	Drivers	Rounds
H4
(Germany) Ollis Garage	Dacia Logan	300	(Germany) Oliver Kriese	1–2
(Germany) Ollis Garage	Dacia Logan	300	(Germany) Yannik Lachmayer	1–2
	BMW M3 E92 GTR	600	(Germany) Bernd Kleeschulte	5
	BMW M3 E92 GTR	600	(Germany) Florian Quante	5
	BMW M3 E92 GTR	600	(Germany) Andreas Schmidt	5
(Switzerland) Hofor-Racing	BMW M3 E46	604	(Switzerland) Michael Kroll	1–2, 5–7
(Switzerland) Hofor-Racing	BMW M3 E46	604	(Switzerland) Alexander Prinz	1–2, 5–7
(Switzerland) Hofor-Racing	BMW M3 E46	604	(Germany) Thomas Mühlenz	1–2, 5, 7
(Switzerland) Hofor-Racing	BMW M3 E46	604	(Switzerland) Chantal Prinz	1–2
(Switzerland) Hofor-Racing	BMW M3 E46	604	(Germany) Lars Jürgen Zander	5–6
(Switzerland) Hofor-Racing	BMW M3 E46	604	(Germany) Bernd Kuepper	7
(Switzerland) Hofor-Racing	BMW M3 E46	605	(Switzerland) Michael Kroll	1, 7
(Switzerland) Hofor-Racing	BMW M3 E46	605	(Germany) Thomas Mühlenz	1, 7
(Switzerland) Hofor-Racing	BMW M3 E46	605	(Switzerland) Alexander Prinz	1, 7
(Switzerland) Hofor-Racing	BMW M3 E46	605	(Switzerland) Chantal Prinz	1
(Switzerland) Hofor-Racing	BMW M3 E46	605	(Germany) Bernd Kuepper	7
H2

== Results ==
Results indicates overall winner across all classes.

Rnd	Race	Pole position	Overall winners
NLS1	64. ADAC ACAS Cup	(Germany) No. 14 Mercedes-AMG Team HRT	(Germany) No. 4 Falken Motorsports
NLS1	64. ADAC ACAS Cup	(United Kingdom) Frank Bird (Spain) Daniel Juncadella	(Germany) Nico Menzel (Sweden) Joel Eriksson
NLS2	63. ADAC Reinoldus-Langstreckenrennen	(Germany) No. 14 Mercedes-AMG Team HRT	(Germany) No. 911 Manthey EMA
NLS2	63. ADAC Reinoldus-Langstreckenrennen	(United Kingdom) Frank Bird (Spain) Daniel Juncadella	(Belgium) Laurens Vanthoor (France) Kévin Estre
24H-Q1	ADAC 24h Nürburgring Qualifiers Rennen 1	(Germany) No. 16 Scherer Sport PHX	(Germany) No. 44 Falken Motorsports
24H-Q1	ADAC 24h Nürburgring Qualifiers Rennen 1	(Switzerland) Ricardo Feller (Germany) Christopher Mies (Germany) Frank Stippler	(Germany) Tim Heinemann (Germany) Sven Müller
24H-Q2	ADAC 24h Nürburgring Qualifiers Rennen 2	(Germany) No. 33 Falken Motorsports	(Germany) No. 44 Falken Motorsports
24H-Q2	ADAC 24h Nürburgring Qualifiers Rennen 2	(France) Julien Andlauer (Austria) Klaus Bachler (Germany) Sven Müller (Belgium) Alessio Picariello	(Germany) Nico Menzel (Austria) Martin Ragginger
NLS3	69. ADAC Westfalenfahrt	(Germany) No. 5 Herberth Motorsport	(Germany) No. 3 Falken Motorsports
NLS3	69. ADAC Westfalenfahrt	(Germany) Vincent Kolb (Germany) Frank Stippler	(France) Julien Andlauer (Germany) Sven Müller
NLS4	6h ADAC Ruhr-Pokal-Rennen	(Germany) No. 48 Mercedes-AMG Team Landgraf	(Germany) No. 9 Team Advan x HRT
NLS4	6h ADAC Ruhr-Pokal-Rennen	(Estonia) Ralf Aron (Austria) Lucas Auer (Andorra) Jules Gounon	(Germany) Hubert Haupt (Germany) Salman Owega (Germany) David Schumacher
NLS5	55. Adenauer ADAC Rundstrecken-Trophy	(Germany) No. 3 Falken Motorsports	(Germany) No. 3 Falken Motorsports
NLS5	55. Adenauer ADAC Rundstrecken-Trophy	(Austria) Klaus Bachler (Belgium) Alessio Picariello	(Austria) Klaus Bachler (Belgium) Alessio Picariello
NLS6	56. ADAC Barbarossapreis	(Germany) No. 48 Mercedes-AMG Team Landgraf	(Germany) No. 48 Mercedes-AMG Team Landgraf
NLS6	56. ADAC Barbarossapreis	(Austria) Lucas Auer (Canada) Mikaël Grenier	(Austria) Lucas Auer (Canada) Mikaël Grenier

== Championship standings ==
=== Points system ===
==== Drivers ====
For drivers classification, points are awarded based on race duration, position in class, and number of starters in class. At the end of the season, the best six races will count for the championship and the rest will be dropped; however, disqualifications or race bans cannot be dropped.

In case of a driver entering for multiple cars in a race, they should nominate which car should they score points from; otherwise they automatically score from the car with the lowest start number.

4-hours race

Position in class	Starter cars in class						
Position in class	1	2	3	4	5	6	7+
1st	2	3	4	6	8	11	15
2nd	-	2	3	4	6	8	11
3rd	-	-	2	3	4	6	8
4th	-	-	-	2	3	4	6
5th	-	-	-	-	2	3	4
6th	-	-	-	-	-	2	3
7th	-	-	-	-	-	-	2
8th and below	-	-	-	-	-	-	1

6-hours race

Position in class	Starter cars in class						
Position in class	1	2	3	4	5	6	7+
1st	3	4	5	8	10	14	19
2nd	-	3	4	5	8	10	14
3rd	-	-	3	4	5	8	10
4th	-	-	-	3	4	5	8
5th	-	-	-	-	3	4	5
6th	-	-	-	-	-	3	4
7th	-	-	-	-	-	-	3
8th and below	-	-	-	-	-	-	1

==== Teams ====
For teams championships, points are awarded by finishing position. Also, for overall teams classification only, bonus points are awarded for top 3 in qualifying.

Position	1st	2nd	3rd	4th	5th	6th	7th	8th	9th	10th	11th	12th	13th	14th	15th	16th	17th	18th	19th	20th
Qualifying	3	2	1																	
Race	35	28	25	22	20	18	16	14	12	11	10	9	8	7	6	5	4	3	2	1

==== CUP2 & CUP3 ====
Classes CUP2 and CUP3 are part of Porsche Endurance Trophy Nürburgring and have their own points system.

Position	1st	2nd	3rd	4th	5th	6th	7th	8th	9th	10th	11th	12th	13th	14th	15th	Pole	FL
4 hours	20	17	15	13	11	10	9	8	7	6	5	4	3	2	1	1	1
6 hours	30	25.5	22.5	19.5	16.5	15	13.5	12	10.5	9	7.5	6	4.5	3	1.5	1	1

=== Drivers classification ===
Pos.	Driver	Team	Class	NLS1	NLS2	24H-Q1	24H-Q2	NLS3	NLS4	NLS5	NLS6	Points
1	(United Kingdom) Toby Goodman	(Germany) #650 Adrenalin Motorsport Team Mainhatten Wheels	M240i	1^{15}	1^{15}	1^{15}	1^{15}	Ret		1^{15}	1^{15}	90
1	(United Kingdom) Toby Goodman	(Germany) #711 Adrenalin Motorsport Team Mainhatten Wheels	V4						Ret			90
1	(Germany) Sven Markert	(Germany) #650 Adrenalin Motorsport Team Mainhatten Wheels	M240i	1^{15}	1^{15}	1^{15}	1^{15}	Ret		1^{15}	1^{15}	90
1	(Germany) Sven Markert	(Germany) #711 Adrenalin Motorsport Team Mainhatten Wheels	V4						Ret			90
1	(Switzerland) Ranko Mijatovic	(Germany) #650 Adrenalin Motorsport Team Mainhatten Wheels	M240i	1^{15}	1^{15}	1^{15}	1^{15}	Ret		1^{15}	1^{15}	90 (95)
1	(Switzerland) Ranko Mijatovic	(Germany) #711 Adrenalin Motorsport Team Mainhatten Wheels	V4						Ret			90 (95)
1	(Switzerland) Ranko Mijatovic	(Germany) #930 Adrenalin Motorsport Team Mainhatten Wheels	CUP3						5^{(5)}	Ret		90 (95)
4	(Germany) Joshua Bednarski	(Germany) #962 AVIA W&S Motorsport	CUP3	2^{11}	1^{15}	1^{15}	1^{15}	1^{15}	1^{19}	WD	Ret	90
4	(Germany) Lucas Daugaard	(Germany) #962 AVIA W&S Motorsport	CUP3	2^{11}	1^{15}	1^{15}	1^{15}	1^{15}	1^{19}	WD	Ret	90
4	(Germany) Moritz Oberheim	(Germany) #962 AVIA W&S Motorsport	CUP3	2^{11}	1^{15}	1^{15}	1^{15}	1^{15}	1^{19}	WD	Ret	90
7	(United Kingdom) Joshua Hislop	(Germany) #491 Mertens Motorsport	VT2-FWD	1^{15}	1^{15}	1^{15}	NC	1^{15}	1^{14}	6^{3}	2^{11}	85 (88)
7	(Germany) Daniel Mertens	(Germany) #491 Mertens Motorsport	VT2-FWD	1^{15}	1^{15}	1^{15}	NC	1^{15}	1^{14}	6^{3}	2^{11}	85 (88)
7	(Germany) Daniel Mertens	(Germany) #496 Mertens Motorsport	VT2-FWD					5^{(4)}				85 (88)
9	(Germany) Tobias Müller	(Germany) #148 Black Falcon Team 48 LOSCH	CUP2	4^{6}	1^{15}	1^{15}	3^{8}	3^{8}	1^{19}	1^{15}		83 (97)
9	(Germany) Tobias Müller	(Germany) #103 Black Falcon	CUP2	12^{(1)}	5^{(4)}						2^{11}	83 (97)
10	(Germany) Tim Sandtler	(Germany) #170 Toyo Tires with Ring Racing	SP10	1^{15}	2^{11}	1^{15}	Ret	1^{15}	4^{8}	1^{15}		79 (85)
10	(Germany) Tim Sandtler	(Germany) #171 Toyo Tires with Ring Racing	SP10								2^{6}	79 (85)
10	(Germany) Tim Sandtler	(Germany) #347 Toyo Tires with Ring Racing	SP-Pro						1^{(3)}	DNS	1^{(2)}	79 (85)
11	(Germany) Andreas Gülden	(Germany) #170 Toyo Tires with Ring Racing	SP10	1^{15}	2^{11}	1^{15}	Ret	1^{15}	4^{8}	1^{15}	1^{2}	79 (81)
11	(Germany) Andreas Gülden	(Germany) #347 Toyo Tires with Ring Racing	SP-Pro						1^{(3)}	DNS		79 (81)
11	(Germany) Marc Hennerici	(Germany) #170 Toyo Tires with Ring Racing	SP10	1^{15}	2^{11}	1^{15}	Ret	1^{15}	4^{8}	1^{15}	1^{2}	79 (81)
11	(Germany) Marc Hennerici	(Germany) #347 Toyo Tires with Ring Racing	SP-Pro						1^{(3)}	DNS		79 (81)
13	(Israel) Moran Gott	(Germany) #1/500 Adrenalin Motorsport Team Mainhatten Wheels	VT2-R+4WD	1^{15}	7^{2}	1^{15}	1^{15}	Ret	Ret	1^{15}	1^{15}	77
13	(Germany) Philipp Leisen	(Germany) #1/500 Adrenalin Motorsport Team Mainhatten Wheels	VT2-R+4WD	1^{15}	7^{2}	1^{15}	1^{15}	Ret	Ret	1^{15}	1^{15}	77
13	(Germany) Daniel Zils	(Germany) #1/500 Adrenalin Motorsport Team Mainhatten Wheels	VT2-R+4WD	1^{15}	7^{2}	1^{15}	1^{15}	Ret	Ret	1^{15}	1^{15}	77 (85)
13	(Germany) Daniel Zils	(Germany) #396 Adrenalin Motorsport Team Mainhatten Wheels	V6	1^{(3)}	1^{(3)}	1^{(4)}	1^{(4)}	1^{(3)}	1^{(5)}	2^{(3)}	1^{(3)}	77 (85)
16	(Germany) Heiko Eichenberg	(Germany) #959 SRS Team Sorg Rennsport	CUP3	1^{15}	Ret	Ret	2^{11}	2^{11}	3^{10}	1^{15}	1^{15}	77
16	(Germany) Heiko Eichenberg	(Germany) #181 SRS Team Sorg Rennsport	SP10								4^{(3)}	77
16	(Germany) Fabio Grosse	(Germany) #959 SRS Team Sorg Rennsport	CUP3	1^{15}	Ret	Ret	2^{11}	2^{11}	3^{10}	1^{15}	1^{15}	77
16	(Germany) Patrik Grütter	(Germany) #959 SRS Team Sorg Rennsport	CUP3	1^{15}	Ret	Ret	2^{11}	2^{11}	3^{10}	1^{15}	1^{15}	77
19	(Germany) Daniel Blickle	(Germany) #120 AVIA W&S Motorsport	CUP2	1^{15}	Ret	2^{11}	4^{6}	2^{11}	2^{14}	2^{11}	1^{15}	77 (83)
19	(Germany) David Jahn	(Germany) #120 AVIA W&S Motorsport	CUP2	1^{15}	Ret	2^{11}	4^{6}	2^{11}	2^{14}	2^{11}	1^{15}	77 (83)
19	(Germany) Tim Scheerbarth	(Germany) #120 AVIA W&S Motorsport	CUP2	1^{15}	Ret	2^{11}	4^{6}	2^{11}	2^{14}	2^{11}	1^{15}	77 (83)
22	(Luxembourg) Steve Jans	(Germany) #148 Black Falcon Team 48 LOSCH	CUP2	4^{6}	1^{15}	1^{15}	3^{8}	3^{8}	1^{19}			76 (82)
22	(Luxembourg) Steve Jans	(Germany) #103 Black Falcon	CUP2								2^{11}	76 (82)
23	(Germany) Noah Nagelsdiek	(Germany) #148 Black Falcon Team 48 LOSCH	CUP2	4^{6}	1^{15}	1^{15}	3^{8}			1^{15}		70
23	(Germany) Noah Nagelsdiek	(Germany) #103 Black Falcon								2^{11}		70
24	(Norway) Oskar Sandberg	(Germany) #169 Dörr Motorsport	SP10	2^{11}	1^{15}			Ret	2^{14}	Ret	1^{8}	67
24	(Norway) Oskar Sandberg	(Germany) #169 Dörr Motorsport	SP8T			1^{11}	1^{8}					67
24	(Germany) Nick Wüstenhagen	(Germany) #169 Dörr Motorsport	SP10	2^{11}	1^{15}			Ret	2^{14}	Ret	1^{8}	67
24	(Germany) Nick Wüstenhagen	(Germany) #169 Dörr Motorsport	SP8T			1^{11}	1^{8}					67
26	(Netherlands) Piet-Jan Ooms	(Germany) #504 SRS Team Sorg Rennsport	VT2-R+4WD	3^{8}	2^{11}	2^{11}	3^{8}	3^{8}	1^{19}	4^{6}	3^{8}	65 (79)
27	(Germany) Yannik Himmels	(Germany) #651 Adrenalin Motorsport Team Mainhatten Wheels	M240i	2^{11}	2^{11}	Ret	2^{11}	1^{8}	1^{8}	2^{11}	Ret	60
27	(United States) Nico Silva	(Germany) #651 Adrenalin Motorsport Team Mainhatten Wheels	M240i	2^{11}	2^{11}	Ret	2^{11}	1^{8}	1^{8}	2^{11}	Ret	60
29	(India) Akshay Gupta	(Germany) #492 Mertens Motorsport	VT2-FWD	5^{4}	5^{4}	3^{8}	Ret	Ret	2^{10}	1^{15}	1^{15}	56
29	(Germany) Alex Georg Schneider	(Germany) #492 Mertens Motorsport	VT2-FWD	5^{4}	5^{4}	3^{8}	Ret	Ret	2^{10}	1^{15}	1^{15}	56
Pos.	Driver	Team	Class	NLS1	NLS2	24H-Q1	24H-Q2	NLS3	NLS4	NLS5	NLS6	Points

Pos.	Driver	Team	Class	NLS1	NLS2	24H-Q1	24H-Q2	NLS3	NLS4	NLS5	NLS6	Points
31	(Germany) Michael Eichhorn	(Germany) #469 Auto Thomas by Jung Motorsport	VT2-FWD	2^{11}	Ret							56
31	(Germany) Michael Eichhorn	(Germany) #470 Auto Thomas by Jung Motorsport	VT2-FWD					2^{11}		3^{8}	Ret	56
31	(Germany) Michael Eichhorn	(Germany) #495 Auto Thomas by Jung Motorsport	VT2-FWD			2^{11}	1^{15}					56
31	(Germany) Tobias Jung	(Germany) #469 Auto Thomas by Jung Motorsport	VT2-FWD	2^{11}	Ret			4^{6}				56
31	(Germany) Tobias Jung	(Germany) #470 Auto Thomas by Jung Motorsport	VT2-FWD	DNS				2^{11}		3^{8}	Ret	56
31	(Germany) Tobias Jung	(Germany) #495 Auto Thomas by Jung Motorsport	VT2-FWD			2^{11}	1^{15}					56
33	(Germany) Florian Kramer	(United States) #731 Plusline Racing Team	V4			2^{4}	1^{8}	3^{8}	1^{19}	1^{8}	2^{8}	55
33	(Germany) Romano Schultz	(United States) #731 Plusline Racing Team	V4			2^{4}	1^{8}	3^{8}	1^{19}	1^{8}	2^{8}	55
35	(Germany) Aaron Wenisch	(Germany) #169 Dörr Motorsport	SP10	2^{11}	1^{15}			Ret		Ret	1^{8}	53
35	(Germany) Aaron Wenisch	(Germany) #169 Dörr Motorsport	SP8T			1^{11}	1^{8}					53
36	(Germany) Horst Baumann	(Germany) #950 Schmickler Performance powered by Ravenol	CUP3	3^{8}	2^{11}	4^{6}	3^{8}	7^{2}		2^{11}	3^{8}	52 (54)
37	(Germany) Ben Bünnagel	(Belgium) #122 Mühlner Motorsport	CUP2	2^{11}	3^{8}	4^{6}	2^{11}	4^{6}	4^{8}	Ret	3^{8}	52 (58)
38	(Denmark) Mads Gravsen	(Germany) #949 SRS Team Sorg Rennsport	CUP3	Ret	4^{6}	2^{11}	5^{4}	3^{8}	2^{14}	9^{1}	4^{6}	49 (50)
38	(United Kingdom) Harley Haughton	(Germany) #949 SRS Team Sorg Rennsport	CUP3	Ret	4^{6}	2^{11}	5^{4}	3^{8}	2^{14}	9^{1}	4^{6}	49 (50)
40	(Germany) Desiree Müller	(Germany) #701/711 EiFelkind Racing Team	V4	2^{6}	2^{6}	DNS	4^{3}	1^{15}	2^{14}	3^{4}	DSQ	45 (48)
40	(Germany) Tim Lukas Müller	(Germany) #701/711 EiFelkind Racing Team	V4	2^{6}	2^{6}	DNS	4^{3}	1^{15}	2^{14}	3^{4}	DSQ	45 (48)
37	(Germany) Andreas Winterwerber	(Germany) #495 Auto Thomas by Jung Motorsport	VT2-FWD			2^{11}	1^{15}					45
37	(Germany) Andreas Winterwerber	(Germany) #470 Auto Thomas by Jung Motorsport	VT2-FWD					2^{11}		3^{8}	Ret	45
43	(Sweden) Dan Berghult	(Germany) #703/750 Keeevin Sports and Racing	V4	1^{8}	DNS	3^{3}	3^{4}	4^{6}	4^{8}	2^{6}	1^{11}	43 (46)
43	(Finland) Juha Miettinen	(Germany) #703/750 Keeevin Sports and Racing	V4	1^{8}	DNS	3^{3}	3^{4}	4^{6}	4^{8}	2^{6}	1^{11}	43 (46)
43	(Brazil) Flavia Pellegrino Fernandes	(Germany) #703/750 Keeevin Sports and Racing	V4	1^{8}	DNS	3^{3}	3^{4}	4^{6}	4^{8}	2^{6}	1^{11}	43 (46)
46	(Germany) Christopher Brück	(Germany) #121 KKrämer Racing	CUP2	3^{8}	NC	7^{2}	1^{15}	Ret	3^{10}	3^{8}	Ret	43
46	(Germany) Christopher Brück	(Germany) #112 KKrämer Racing	CUP2					Ret				43
46	(Germany) Michele Di Martino	(Germany) #121 KKrämer Racing	CUP2	3^{8}	NC	7^{2}	1^{15}	Ret	3^{10}	3^{8}	Ret	43
48	(Germany) Klaus Faßbender	(Germany) #652 Adrenalin Motorsport Team Mainhatten Wheels	M240i	3^{8}	Ret	2^{11}	3^{8}		2^{5}	3^{8}		40
49	(Germany) Peter Terting	(Belgium) #124 Mühlner Motorsport	CUP2	11^{1}	2^{11}	3^{8}	Ret	1^{15}	6^{4}			39
50	(Germany) Michael Tischner	(Germany) #171 Toyo Tires with Ring Racing	SP10	8^{1}	5^{4}	2^{11}	2^{11}	3^{8}	6^{4}			39
51	(Germany) "Sub7BTG"	(Germany) #501 Adrenalin Motorsport Team Mainhatten Wheels	VT2-R+4WD	4^{6}	5^{4}	4^{6}	2^{11}		4^{8}	8^{1}		36
52	(Switzerland) Ivan Jacoma	(Germany) #184/165 Schmickler Performance powered by Ravenol	SP10	3^{8}	3^{8}	3^{8}	Ret	2^{11}		Ret	Ret	35
52	(Germany) Claudius Karch	(Germany) #184/165 Schmickler Performance powered by Ravenol	SP10	3^{8}	3^{8}	3^{8}	Ret	2^{11}		Ret	Ret	35
52	(Germany) Kai Riemer	(Germany) #184/165 Schmickler Performance powered by Ravenol	SP10	3^{8}	3^{8}	3^{8}	Ret	2^{11}		Ret	Ret	35
55	(Germany) Marvin Marino	(Germany) #651 Adrenalin Motorsport Team Mainhatten Wheels	M240i	2^{11}	2^{11}	Ret	2^{11}					33
56	(Germany) Danny Brink	(Germany) #476 Sharky Racing	VT2-FWD	3^{8}	3^{8}	Ret	WD					32
56	(Germany) Danny Brink	(Germany) #650 Adrenalin Motorsport Team Mainhatten Wheels	M240i					Ret				32
56	(Germany) Danny Brink	(Germany) #652 Adrenalin Motorsport Team Mainhatten Wheels	M240i								3^{8}	32
56	(Germany) Danny Brink	(Germany) #711 Adrenalin Motorsport Team Mainhatten Wheels	V4						Ret			32
56	(Germany) Danny Brink	(Germany) #313 Sharky Racing	SP3T							1^{8}		32
57	(Germany) Moritz Kranz	(Belgium) #122 Mühlner Motorsport	CUP2	2^{(11)}	3^{(8)}	4^{6}	2^{(11)}	4^{6}	4^{8}	Ret		32 (55)
57	(Germany) Moritz Kranz	(Belgium) #124 Mühlner Motorsport	CUP2	11^{1}	2^{11}	3^{(8)}	Ret					32 (55)
58	(Germany) Oliver Frisse	(Germany) #700/702 IFB powered by QTQ Race Performance	V4	Ret	1^{8}	1^{6}	2^{6}	Ret	3^{10}			30
58	(Germany) Jürgen Huber	(Germany) #700/702 IFB powered by QTQ Race Performance	V4	Ret	1^{8}	1^{6}	2^{6}	Ret	3^{10}			30
58	(Germany) Simon Sagmeister	(Germany) #700/702 IFB powered by QTQ Race Performance	V4	Ret	1^{8}	1^{6}	2^{6}	Ret	3^{10}			30
61	(Austria) David Griessner	(Germany) #930 Adrenalin Motorsport Team Mainhatten Wheels	CUP3	4^{6}	3^{8}	3^{8}	9^{1}	Ret	5^{5}	Ret	11^{1}	29
61	(Germany) Stefan Kruse	(Germany) #930 Adrenalin Motorsport Team Mainhatten Wheels	CUP3	4^{6}	3^{8}	3^{8}	9^{1}	Ret	5^{5}	Ret	11^{1}	29
63	(Norway) Håkon Schjærin	(Norway) #801 Møller Bil Motorsport	TCR	1^{6}		2^{11}		1^{3}		1^{8}		28
64	(Ukraine) Oleksii Kikireshko	(Germany) #969 SRS Team Sorg Rennsport	CUP3	Ret	5^{4}	5^{4}	7^{2}	5^{4}	6^{4}	3^{8}	5^{4}	28 (30)
65	(Germany) Daniel Korn	(Germany) #444 Adrenalin Motorsport Team Mainhatten Wheels	V5	1^{4}	1^{4}	1^{6}	Ret	1^{4}	1^{5}	2^{4}	Ret	27
65	(Germany) Tobias Korn	(Germany) #444 Adrenalin Motorsport Team Mainhatten Wheels	V5	1^{4}	1^{4}	1^{6}	Ret	1^{4}	1^{5}	2^{4}	Ret	27
65	(Germany) Ulrich Korn	(Germany) #444 Adrenalin Motorsport Team Mainhatten Wheels	V5	1^{4}	1^{4}	1^{6}	Ret	1^{4}	1^{5}	2^{4}	Ret	27
68	(Germany) Christian Kraus	(Germany) #652 Adrenalin Motorsport Team Mainhatten Wheels	M240i					2^{6}	2^{5}	3^{8}	3^{8}	27
69	(Germany) Richard Jodexnis	(Germany) #181 SRS Team Sorg Rennsport	SP10	7^{2}	NC	7^{2}	4^{6}	6^{3}	7^{3}	3^{8}	4^{3}	25 (27)
70	(Turkey) Mustafa Mehmet Kaya	(Germany) #103 Black Falcon	CUP2	12^{1}	5^{4}	5^{4}	5^{4}	5^{4}	7^{3}	4^{6}		25 (26)
70	(Germany) Mike Stursberg	(Germany) #103 Black Falcon	CUP2	12^{1}	5^{4}	5^{4}	5^{4}	5^{4}	7^{3}	4^{6}		25 (26)
72	(Germany) Achim Wawer	(Germany) #184/165 Schmickler Performance powered by Ravenol	SP10	3^{8}	3^{8}	3^{8}	Ret			Ret		24
73	(Denmark) Kaj Schubert	(Germany) #505 (BMW 328i)	VT2-R+4WD	Ret	6^{3}	3^{8}	WD	2^{11}	10^{1}			23
74	(Germany) Roland Froese	(Germany) #930 Adrenalin Motorsport Team Mainhatten Wheels	CUP3	4^{6}	3^{8}	3^{8}	9^{1}					23
75	(Germany) Tobias Wahl	(Germany) #191 Walkenhorst Racing	SP10	5^{4}	4^{6}	DNS	6^{3}		3^{10}			23
76	(Germany) Christian Büllesbach	(Germany) #396 Adrenalin Motorsport Team Mainhatten Wheels	V6	1^{3}	1^{3}	1^{4}	1^{4}	1^{3}	1^{5}	2^{3}	1^{3}	22 (28)
76	(Germany) Lutz Rühl	(Germany) #396 Adrenalin Motorsport Team Mainhatten Wheels	V6	1^{3}	1^{3}	1^{4}	1^{4}	1^{3}	1^{5}	2^{3}	1^{3}	22 (28)
76	(Germany) Andreas Schettler	(Germany) #396 Adrenalin Motorsport Team Mainhatten Wheels	V6	1^{3}	1^{3}	1^{4}	1^{4}	1^{3}	1^{5}	2^{3}	1^{3}	22 (28)
79	(Germany) Pascal Fritzsche	(Germany) #499 Keeevin Sports and Racing	VT2-FWD	Ret	Ret	Ret	2^{11}	Ret				22
79	(Germany) Pascal Fritzsche	(Germany) #494 (Volkswagen Golf 8 GTI Clubsport)	VT2-FWD							2^{11}	Ret	22
79	(Germany) Thomas Schönfeld	(Germany) #499 Keeevin Sports and Racing	VT2-FWD	Ret	Ret	Ret	2^{11}	Ret				22
79	(Germany) Thomas Schönfeld	(Germany) #494 (Volkswagen Golf 8 GTI Clubsport)	VT2-FWD							2^{11}	Ret	22
Pos.	Driver	Team	Class	NLS1	NLS2	24H-Q1	24H-Q2	NLS3	NLS4	NLS5	NLS6	Points

=== Teams classification ===
==== NLS Speed-Trophäe (Overall) ====
Displaying entries that has achieved top 20 finish and/or top 3 qualifying in at least 1 round.

Pos.	Team	Class	NLS1	NLS2	24H-Q1	24H-Q2	NLS3	NLS4	NLS5	NLS6	Points
1	(Germany) #4/44 Falken Motorsports	SP9 Pro	1	3^{3}	1^{3}	1	Ret^{2}	Ret	11^{2}		146
2	(Germany) #911 Manthey EMA	SP9 Pro	2	1	2	3				2	144
3	(Germany) #6 Team Advan x HRT	SP9 Pro-Am	6	13^{2}	15	16					113
3	(Germany) #6 Team Advan x HRT	SP9 Pro					3	DNS^{2}	3	4	113
4	(Germany) #3/33 Falken Motorsports	SP9 Pro	Ret	Ret	5	Ret^{1}	1^{3}	Ret	1^{1}		97
5	(Germany) #120 AVIA W&S Motorsport	CUP2	9	Ret	23	23	7	3	5	5	93
6	(Germany) #148 Black Falcon Team 48 LOSCH	CUP2	13	6	21	22	8	2	4		90
7	(Germany) #27 Red Bull Team ABT	SP9 Pro	4^{3}	2	8	8					79
8	(Belgium) #122 Mühlner Motorsport	CUP2	10	8	25	21	10	6	Ret	7	70
9	(Germany) #103 Black Falcon	CUP2	39	11	26	25	11	9	10	6	61
10	(Belgium) #124 Mühlner Motorsport	CUP2	34	7	24	Ret	6	8	18	NC	51
11	(Germany) #50 équipe vitesse	SP9 Am	16	16	22	24	14	5	103	9	49
12	(Germany) #112 KKrämer Racing	CUP2	15	10	27	26	Ret	10	14	10	46
12	(Germany) #121 KKrämer Racing	CUP2	12	NC	28	20	Ret	4	8	Ret	46
14	(Germany) #17 PROsport-Racing	SP9 Pro-Am	7				Ret	Ret	Ret		42 (47)
14	(Germany) #17 PROsport-Racing	SP9 Pro			16‡	Ret				3^{3}	42 (47)
15	(Belgium) #123 Mühlner Motorsport	CUP2	20	66	30	28	13	12	12	8	27
16	(Lithuania) #8/71 Juta Racing	SP9 Am	11	Ret	20	18	Ret	Ret	6	Ret	32
17	(Germany) #119 Clickversicherungs Team	CUP2	18	14	29	27		14	13		25
18	(Germany) #959 SRS Team Sorg Rennsport	CUP3	21	Ret	Ret	36	17	20	16	11	20
19	(Germany) #169 Dörr Motorsport	SP10	24	17			Ret	18‡	Ret	13	12 (15)
19	(Germany) #169 Dörr Motorsport	SP8T			35	34					12 (15)
19	(Germany) #962 AVIA W&S Motorsport	CUP3	22	18	37	33	16	17		Ret	12
21	(Germany) #949 SRS Team Sorg Rennsport	CUP3	Ret	27	41	46	18	19	43	15	11
22	(Germany) #952 Smyrlis Racing	CUP3	DNS	Ret	Ret		20		Ret	12	10
23	(Germany) #170 Toyo Tires with Ring Racing	SP10	23	19	42	Ret	15	24	20		9
24	(Germany) #100 Max Kruse Racing	CUP2	14	Ret							7
24	(Germany) #950 Schmickler Performance powered by Ravenol	CUP3	25	23	44	38	28		21	14	7
26	(Germany) #969 SRS Team Sorg Rennsport	CUP3	Ret	30	47	48	23	29	22	16	5
27	(Germany) #117 Halder Motorsport	CUP2	19	12‡							2 (11)
27	(Germany) #184 Schmickler Performance powered by Ravenol	SP10	27	22			19		Ret	Ret	2
29	(Germany) #953 Smyrlis Racing	CUP3	Ret	74	NC	47	Ret		51	20	1
Ineligible for championship
–	(Germany) #15 Scherer Sport PHX	SP9 Pro			4^{2}	5			2^{3}	Ret^{2}	(73)
–	(Germany) #48 Mercedes-AMG Team Landgraf	SP9 Pro					2	Ret^{1}		1^{1}	(69)
–	(Germany) #9 Team Advan x HRT	SP9 Pro					5	1^{3}			(56)
–	(Germany) #16 Scherer Sport PHX	SP9 Pro	3^{2}		3^{1}	Ret					(55)
–	(Germany) #14 Mercedes-AMG Team HRT	SP9 Pro	5^{1}	4^{1}							(48)
–	(United States) #706 Glickenhaus Racing LLC	SP-X	8	5	18	17					(41)
–	(Germany) #5 Herberth Motorsport	SP9 Pro			17	12^{2}	4^{1}	Ret			(40)
–	(Germany) #99 Rowe Racing	SP9 Pro			11	4					(32)
–	(Germany) #54 Dinamic GT	SP9 Pro			12	15		Ret	7		(31)
–	(Germany) #72 BMW M Team RMG	SP9 Pro			10	6					(29)
–	(Germany) #105 Max Kruse Racing	CUP2					Ret	7			(28)
–	(Germany) #105 Max Kruse Racing	AT(-G)							9		(28)
–	(Germany) #130 Mercedes-AMG Team GetSpeed	SP9 Pro			7	9					(28)
–	(Germany) #4 Mercedes-AMG Team Bilstein by HRT	SP9 Pro			13	7					(24)
–	(Germany) #9 Mercedes-AMG Team GetSpeed	SP9 Pro			9	10					(23)
–	(Germany) #1 Frikadelli Racing Team	SP9 Pro			6	Ret^{3}					(19)
–	(Germany) #8 Mercedes-AMG Team GetSpeed	SP9 Pro			14	11					(17)
-	(Thailand) #786 Renazzo Motor with mcchip-dkr	SP9 Am	17	9							(16)
-	(Thailand) #786 Renazzo Motor with mcchip-dkr	SP9 Pro-Am					Ret				(16)
–	(Germany) #35 Walkenhorst Motorsport	SP9 Pro-Am					9	Ret			(12)
–	(Germany) #25 Huber Motorsport	SP9 Pro-Am						11			(10)
–	(Germany) #127 Max Kruse Racing	CUP2		15	36	30		Ret	17		(10)
–	(Germany) #125 Huber Motorsport	CUP2			32	Ret	12		NC		(9)
–	(Germany) #33 Car Collection Motorsport	SP9 Pro-Am						13			(8)
–	(Germany) #333 Max Kruse Racing	AT(-G)			69	54		36	15		(6)
–	(Germany) #347 Toyo Tires with Ring Racing	SP-Pro						15	DNS	45	(6)
–	(Germany) #187 FK Performance Motorsport	SP10						16			(5)
–	(Germany) #171 Toyo Tires with Ring Racing	SP10	49	26	49	42	22	31	31	17	(4)
–	(Germany) #24 Lionspeed GP	SP9 Pro-Am			19	19					(4)
–	(Germany) #20 Up2Race	SP9 Pro								18	(3)
–	(Germany) #150 Team Bilstein by Black Falcon	SP8T	Ret	20	40	43	Ret	21	19		(3)
–	(Germany) #179 Dörr Motorsport	SP10					31	Ret	102	19	(2)
Pos.	Team	Class	NLS1	NLS2	24H-Q1	24H-Q2	NLS3	NLS4	NLS5	NLS6	Points

‡: Result not counted for classification

Colour	Result
Gold	Winner
Silver	Second place
Bronze	Third place
Green	Points classification
Blue	Non-points classification
Blue	Non-classified finish (NC)
Purple	Retired, not classified (Ret)
Red	Did not qualify (DNQ)
Red	Did not pre-qualify (DNPQ)
Black	Disqualified (DSQ)
White	Did not start (DNS)
White	Withdrew (WD)
White	Race cancelled (C)
Blank	Did not practice (DNP)
Blank	Did not arrive (DNA)
Blank	Excluded (EX)

^{1} ^{2} ^{3}– Points-scoring position in qualifying

== See also ==
- 2024 24 Hours of Nürburgring

== Bibliography ==
- Tim Upietz, Patrik Koziolek, Thorsten Schlottmann & Sandro Kley (19 December 2024). Nürburgring Langstrecken-Serie 2024. Gruppe C Motorsport Verlag. ISBN 978-3-948501 37-2.
