= 2016 ENEOS 1006 kilometrų lenktynės =

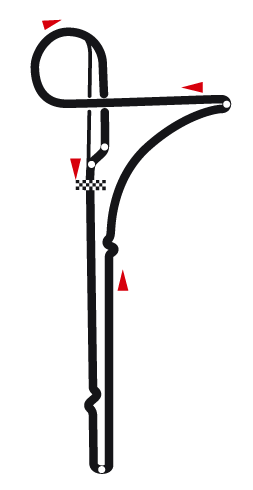
- Layout of the Palanga Circuit

Race details
- Date: 23 July 2016
- Official name: ENEOS 1006 kilometrų lenktynės
- Location: Palanga Circuit; Palanga, Lithuania
- Course: Temporary racing facility
- Course length: 2.681 km (1.675 miles)
- Distance: 375 laps, 1006 km (625 miles)

Pole position
Driver	(Lithuania) Ramūnas Čapkauskas	Carre & MVP Algirdai Racing Team
- Time: 1:09.724

Podium
First	Sebastiaan Bleekemolen	General Financing by Pitlane
Second	TBD	TBD
Third	TBD	TBD

The 2016 ENEOS 1006 kilometrų lenktynės (English: ENEOS 1006 km race) was the 17th edition of the ENEOS 1000 kilometrų lenktynės, a touring car and GT endurance racing event held in Lithuania, at Palanga circuit, 2 kilometers away from the resort town of Palanga from July 21-23, 2016.

== Background ==
On June 6, 2016, it was announced that the race distance will be increased from 1000 kilometers to 1006 kilometers to honor new event promoter TV6. This marked a renewed partnership between race organisers and UAB TELE-3, a Lithuanian television company that owns both TV6 and TV3 brands in Lithuania. TV3 was the race promoter from 2005 to 2008 and the race was then known as the 1003 kilometrų lenktynės.

42 teams entered the race. Multiple time and defending champion Jonas Gelžinis joined Benediktas Vanagas and Sebastiaan Bleekemolen in the General Financing by Pitlane team, while his brother and 2015 event winner Ignas Gelžinis moved to the newly formed Team Hot Wheels. Tautvydas Barštys, another winner of the previous edition, did not return to defend the title.

Lithuanian racing legend Stasys Brundza crashed his Marcos Mantis during the first practice session and was forced to replace his car with a BMW M3. However, it failed an inspection by a technical commission, and was judged to not meet the requirements of the race.

== Qualifying ==
Qualifying took place on July 22. Ramūnas Čapkauskas took pole position for Carre & MVP by Algirdai team, with best effort of 1:09.724. It was his third pole position with Aquila CR1 prototype. Čapkauskas previously took pole positions in 2012 and 2013 edition of 1000 kilometrų lenktynės. Marius Staboševičius, representing Brum Brum Sport, was second with BMW M3. Jonas Gelžinis took third, driving for the General Financing by Pitlane team. Robertas Kupčikas was fastest in diesel powered car class and took eighth position on the grid with a lap time of 1:14.606.

=== Qualification: Top 10 shootout results ===
Pos	Class	No	Team	Drivers	Vehicle	Lap time
1	X1	13	Carre & MVP Algirdai Racing Team	(Lithuania) Ramūnas Čapkauskas	Aquila CR1	1:09.724
2	GT	45	Brum Brum Sport	(Lithuania) Marius Slaboševičius	BMW M3	+0.530
3	GT	1	General Financing by Pitlane	(Lithuania) Jonas Gelžinis	Porsche Carrera GT3 Cup	+1.820
4	A3000+	71	Palanga Spa hotel by EMG Motorsport	(Lithuania) Nemunas Dagilis	Porsche Carrera GT3 Cup	+2.701
5	GT	99	Team Hot Wheels	(Lithuania) Ignas Gelžinis	BMW M3	+3.048
6	GT	14	MOJO Lounge Racing by JR Motorsport	(Netherlands) Michael Verhagen	BMW M3 GTR	+4.095
7	GT	58	Rotoma Racing	(Lithuania) Robertas Graudinis	BMW M3	+4.151
8	D	92	RIMO	(Lithuania) Rokas Kupčikas	BMW 335D	+5.025
9	GT	8	Techninis projektas	(Lithuania) Giedrius Notkus	BMW M3	+5.443
10	X1	67	Gera Dovana - Emex Racing	(Lithuania) Simas Juodviršis	Lotus Exige	+14.132

== Race ==
The race was held on July 23. Sebastiaan Bleekemolen finished first, representing the "General Financing by Pitlane" team.
