= Aurum 1006 km =

Annual motorsport event in Lithuania

AURUM 1006 km powered by Hankook
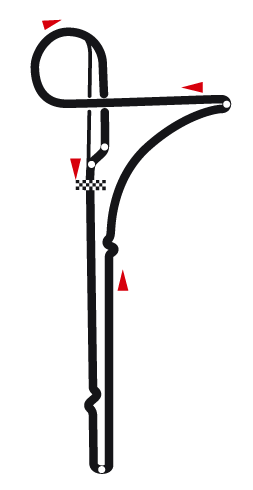

Circuit information
- Venue: Palanga Circuit
- Corporate sponsor: AURUM
- First race: 2000
- Last race: 2026
- Distance: 1006 km
- Laps: 373
- Duration: 10 hours
- Previous names: ENEOS 1006 km powered by Hankook, Horn Grand Prix 1000 kilometrų lenktynės, Horn Grand prix 1003 km lenktynės, Omnitel 1000 kilometrų lenktynės
- Most wins (driver): Jonas Gelžinis (10)
- Most wins (team): Circle K milesPLUS Racing Team (3)
- Most wins (manufacturer): Porsche (16)

The Aurum 1006 km is a touring car and GT endurance racing event held annually in Lithuania, at Palanga Circuit, two kilometers away from the resort town of Palanga. The race was first held in 2000.

== History ==
1000 km lenktynės at Palanga Circuit, was first held in 2000. A total of 18 teams entered the race. It was won by Vytautas Venskūnas, Vladas Laurinavičius, and Eugenijus Tumalevičius, driving a Porsche 911 993. In 2004, the number of participants increased to 34, in 2005 to 37. In the same year, the race distance was increased to 1003 km to honor new title sponsor TV3 and Horn beer, and the race was renamed to "Horn 1003 kilometrų lenktynės".

The number of participants continued to increase in the following year as the race was officially included in the list of FIA sanctioned events and the race began to attract teams and race drivers from other countries. In 2006 41 teams entered the race and in 2007 the number of participants increased to maximum 60.

In 2008 total 75 teams submitted their entries, but only 60 entered the race, as other teams, who failed to qualify, had to compete in support 100 laps race. A new title sponsor was introduced in 2007, as Omnitel replaced Horn. Therefore, the race reverted to its original 1000 km format. Omnitel pulled off its support before 2013 edition of the race, and the race became known simply as "1000 kilometrų lenktynės" until ENEOS became a title sponsor in 2015.

In 2017 race organizers introduced a Hankook mandatory tyre, and along with TV6, it also became one of the race sponsors and race name was renamed to: "ENEOS 1006 km powered by Hankook", and in 2018 race was renamed again when the new main sponsor Aurum entered and the event became - "Aurum 1006 km powered by Hankook". In 2023, Hankook stopped supporting the race, thus allowing teams to choose tyre manufacturers by themselves. Following the departure of Hankook, the current race name is "Aurum 1006 km lenktynės"

== Classes ==
Touring cars, GT and prototypes can enter the race if they comply with technical regulations of the race. Open top cars, such as Radical SR8, were banned from the race after the 2014 event due to safety reasons. From 2019 class system where changed: cars that satisfy Technical Regulations and are not faster than FIA GT3 will be classified and divided into classes according to the Technical regulations of the Event.

| Class | Description |
|---|---|
| GT | FIA GT3 cars (Art 257A), FIA R - GT cars (Art 256) and SRO GT4 (with present or expired homologation). Cars that comply with GT class principle, but were not built for FIA/ SRO homologation regulations. For example, when the base of car is a legal road sports car (Porsche, Ferrari or other). The organiser can divide cars into 2 or 3 subgroups (GT3, GT4 and GT Open ), if there are enough cars registered for separate classification. |
| TC | Touring Cars; prepared by FIA rules for A - and N - Group (Art. 254 and Art.255), FIA rules for R - Groups (Art.260, 260d and 261) and these Rules for TC class. Class TC will be divided by calculated engine capacity to subgroups TC1 - TC4. |
| SP | Special Cars; cars which are not accepted in any other class and silhouette cars. Electric and Hybrid cars can start only with special request. This request must be presented to the organiser at the least 3 months prior to the race. Class SP will be divided by calculating engine capacity to subgroups SP1 - SP3 and SPE for electric/ hybrid cars. |
| D | Diesel cars; cars with diesel engine. |
| TCR | Cars prepared according to TCR Touring Car requirements and complying to an Appendixes for Aurum 1006 km Race and TCR endurance events. |

== Winners of the Aurum 1006 km ==
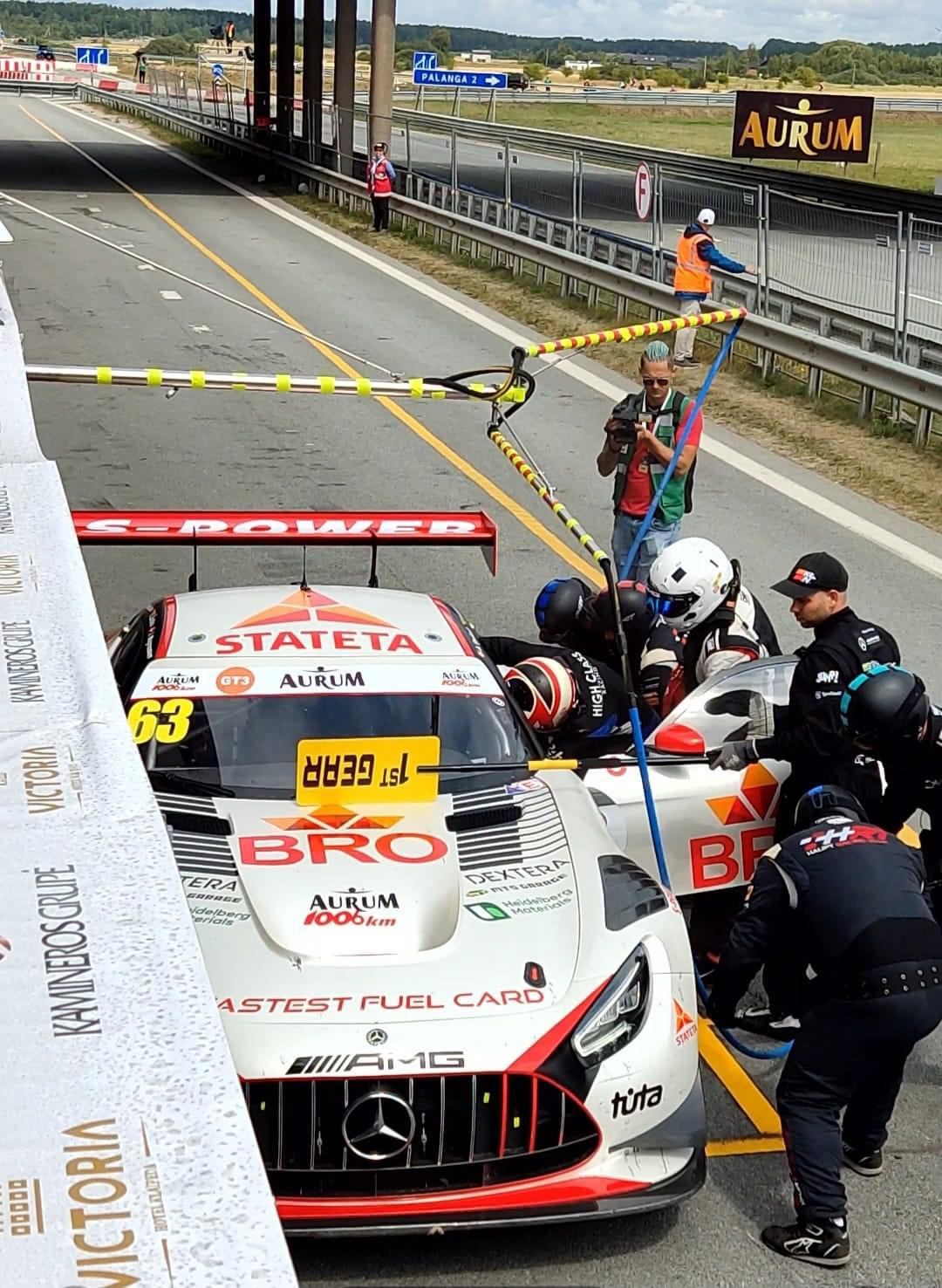
Stateta BRO by HMobile, winners of the 2023 edition.

| Year | Best lap time | Car | Class | Drivers | Team |
|---|---|---|---|---|---|
| 2026 | 1:07.892 | Porsche 992 GT3 Cup | GT Open | (Lithuania) Mantas Janavičius (Lithuania) Marius Bartkus (United Kingdom) Ben Barker | RIMO Adero & LKU.LT |
| 2025 | 1:07.050 | Audi R8 LMS GT3 Evo II | GT3 | (Lithuania) Mantas Matukaitis (Lithuania) Karolis Jovaiša (Lithuania) Egidijus Gražys | Bio-Circle & HSG by SWAG |
| 2024 | 1:06.246 | Mercedes-AMG GT3 Evo | GT3 | (Denmark) Anders Fjordbach (Lithuania) Julius Adomavičius (Lithuania) Nemunas Dagilis (United Kingdom) Tim Whale | Stateta BRO-TOKS by IGNERA |
| 2023 | 1:05.425 | Mercedes-AMG GT3 Evo | GT3 | (Denmark) Anders Fjordbach (Denmark) Jan Magnussen (Lithuania) Eimantas Navikauskas (Lithuania) Edvinas Žadeikis | Stateta BRO by HMobile |
| 2022 | 1:07.126 | Audi R8 LMS GT3 | GT3 | (Lithuania) Julius Adomavičius (Lithuania) Ignas Gelžinis (Lithuania) Marijus Mazuch (Lithuania) Eimantas Navikauskas | Circle K - Lesta Racing Team |
| 2021 | 1:09.108 | Porsche 991 GT3 Cup Gen2 | GT Open | (Lithuania) Julius Adomavičius (Lithuania) Jonas Gelžinis (Lithuania) Ignas Gelžinis (Estonia) Ralf Aron | Circle K milesPLUS Racing Team |
| 2020 | 1:09.553 | Porsche 991 GT3 Cup Gen2 | GT Open | (Lithuania) Julius Adomavičius (Lithuania) Jonas Gelžinis (Lithuania) Oskaras Brazaitis (Estonia) Ralf Aron | Circle K milesPLUS Racing Team |
| 2019 | 1:10.384 | Porsche 991 GT3 Cup | GT | (Lithuania) Julius Adomavičius (Lithuania) Jonas Gelžinis (Lithuania) Ignas Gelžinis (Estonia) Ralf Aron | Circle K milesPLUS Racing Team |
| 2018 | 1:10.987 | Porsche 991 GT3 Cup Gen2 | GT | (Belgium) Steve Vanbellingen (Lithuania) Nemunas Dagilis (Lithuania) Robertas Kupčikas | Palanga SPA Hotel by EMG Motorsport |
| 2017 | 1:11.781 | Porsche 997 GT3 Cup | GT | (Lithuania) Ignas Gelžinis (Lithuania) Jonas Gelžinis (Lithuania) Egidijus Valeiša | Skuba Dream |
| 2016 | 1:11.489 | Porsche 997 GT3 Cup | GT | (Netherlands) Sebastiaan Bleekemolen (Lithuania) Jonas Gelžinis (Lithuania) Benediktas Vanagas | General Financing team Pitlane |
| 2015 | 1:12.091 | Porsche 991 GT3 Cup | GT | (Lithuania) Jonas Gelžinis (Lithuania) Ignas Gelžinis (Lithuania) Tautvydas Barštys | Juta – KG Group |
| 2014 | 1:17.655 | BMW E90 M3 | A3000+ | (Lithuania) Jonas Gelžinis (Lithuania) Ignas Gelžinis (Lithuania) Edvinas Arkušauskas | Liqui Moly Racing Team Lithuania |
| 2013 | | Porsche 997 GT3 Cup | GT | (Lithuania) Benediktas Vanagas (Lithuania) Nemunas Dagilis (Lithuania) Nerijus Dagilis | 15 min. - General Financing |
| 2012 | 1:21.209 | Porsche 997 GT3 Cup | GT | (South Africa) Sun Moodley (South Africa) Andrew Culbert (South Africa) Manogh Maharaj | Oktanas Racing |
| 2011 | 1:27.594 | Honda Civic Type-R | A2000 | (Lithuania) Martynas Samuitis (Lithuania) Arūnas Granskas | Neiluva - Martin Sport |
| 2010 | 1:23.568 | BMW M3 Silhouette | X1 | (Belgium) Benny Smets (Belgium) Ward Sluys (Belgium) Steve Vanbellingen | KS Motorsport |
| 2009 | 1:22.955 | Ferrari F430 Challenge | GT | (Lithuania) Jonas Gelžinis (Russia) Aleksey Vasilyev (Ukraine) Ilja Burenko | Snoras Client team |
| 2008 | 1:20.734 | Spyker C8 Spyder GT2R | X1 | (Lithuania) Jonas Gelžinis (Germany) Ralf Kelleners (Russia) Aleksey Vasilyev (United Kingdom) Peter Dumbreck | Snoras Spyker Squadron |
| 2007 | 1:25.245 | AGM Kit Car | X1 | (Lithuania) Ramūnas Čapkauskas (Lithuania) Vidas Čebatavičius | Adampolis - Racing team |
| 2006 | 1:25.570 | Porsche 996 GT3 Cup | A3000+ | (Lithuania) Jonas Gelžinis (Lithuania) Aurelijus Rusteika (Lithuania) Giedrius Tomas Jarmalavičius (Lithuania) Arūnas Bartusevičius | Topo Centras |
| 2005 | 1:26.641 | Porsche 996 GT3 Cup | A3000+ | (Lithuania) Egidijus Dapšas (Lithuania) Nemunas Dagilis (Lithuania) Nerijus Dagilis | Oktanas - Snaigė |
| 2004 | 1:22.068 | Audi RS4 | A3000+ | (Lithuania) Vytautas Venskūnas (Lithuania) Vygantas Simuntis (Lithuania) Linas Karlavičius (Lithuania) Aivaras Pyragius | Los Patrankos - Printera |
| 2003 | 1:21.794 | Porsche 996 GT3 Cup | A3000+ | (Lithuania) Vytautas Venskūnas (Lithuania) Alfredas Kudla | SK D.A.L |
| 2002 | 1:25.995 | Porsche 993 Cup | A3000+ | (Lithuania) Vladas Laurinavičius (Lithuania) Eugenijus Tamulevičius (Lithuania) Aurelijus Simaška (Lithuania) Nikita Kondrachinas | Lietuvos "Porsche" Klubas |
| 2001 | 1:24.766 | Porsche 993 RSR | | (Lithuania) Vytautas Venskūnas (Lithuania) Alfredas Kudla | Automodus |
| 2000 | | Porsche 993 Cup | ST over 2000 | (Lithuania) Vytautas Venskūnas (Lithuania) Vladas Laurinavičius (Lithuania) Eugenijus Tamulevičius | Lietuvos "Porsche" Klubas |

== Individual race history ==
=== 2010 ===
2010 Omnitel 1006 kilometrų lenktynės was an 11th installment of 1000 kilometrų lenktynės. It was held on July 15–17, 2010.

The race was won by Steve Vanbellingen, Benny Smets and Ward Sluys from Belgium with BMW M3 Silhouette, who drove for KS Motorsport team. Oktanas Racing drivers Robertas Kupčikas, Nemunas Dagilis and Nerijus Dagilis finished second with Porsche 997 GT3, two laps down. Fuchs MP Sport Star Moto team's drivers Maciej Marcinkewicz, Maciej Stanco and Pawel Potocki finished third with Ferrari F430 GT3 Scuderia, 15 laps down.

Only 34 cars from 42 finished the race. Fastest lap was recorded by Robertas Kupčikas, with a laptime of 1.21:032.

=== 2012 ===
2012 Omnitel 1000 kilometrų lenktynės was the 13th installment of 1000 kilometrų lenktynės. It was held on July 19–21, 2012.

The race was won by South Africans Sun Moodley, Andrew Culbert and Manogh Maharaj, who drove Porsche 911 GT3 Cup for Oktanas Racing, despite running out of fuel in the final lap. JR Motorsport team drivers took second with BMW M3 Silhouette. RIMO team with BMW 3 Series finished third and also took victory in diesel-powered cars class.

Race favourites BOD-Bauer Racing took pole position with a laptime of 1:30.204, but soon after the start their Aquila CR1 developed a brakes issue and finished only in 28th position. During the race weekend team also set the fastest Palanga Circuit laptime of 1:17.270, which is still the best lap time on the old configuration circuit.

=== 2014 ===
2014 1000 kilometrų lenktynės was the 15th installment of 1000 kilometrų lenktynės. It was held on July 17–19, 2014. This was the first time when the race was held in shortened circuit. This was also the second time in a row when the race did not have a title sponsor after Omnitel pulled off its support in 2013.

The race was red flagged for the first time in history due to heavy rain after 303 laps from 373. Victory was awarded to Liqui Moly Racing Team Lithuania and its drivers Jonas Gelžinis, Ignas Gelžinis and Edvinas Arkušauskas with BMW M3. "INTER RAO Lietuva" finished second, 13 seconds behind with another BMW M3. Final podium position was taken by "Macrofinance" racing team with third BMW M3.

Qualification was dominated by sports car drivers. Speed Factory Racing driver Konstantin Calko with Radical SR8 took pole position with a laptime of 1:07.046. "15min-GSR-Telsiu statyba" with Radical SR5 was second, 2.344 seconds behind. BarBar'a-Bauer by Algirdai took third, 2.892 behind, but due to technical problems they all finished outside the top 10.
