= Spyker Squadron =

Dutch factory racing team

(Netherlands) Spyker Squadron
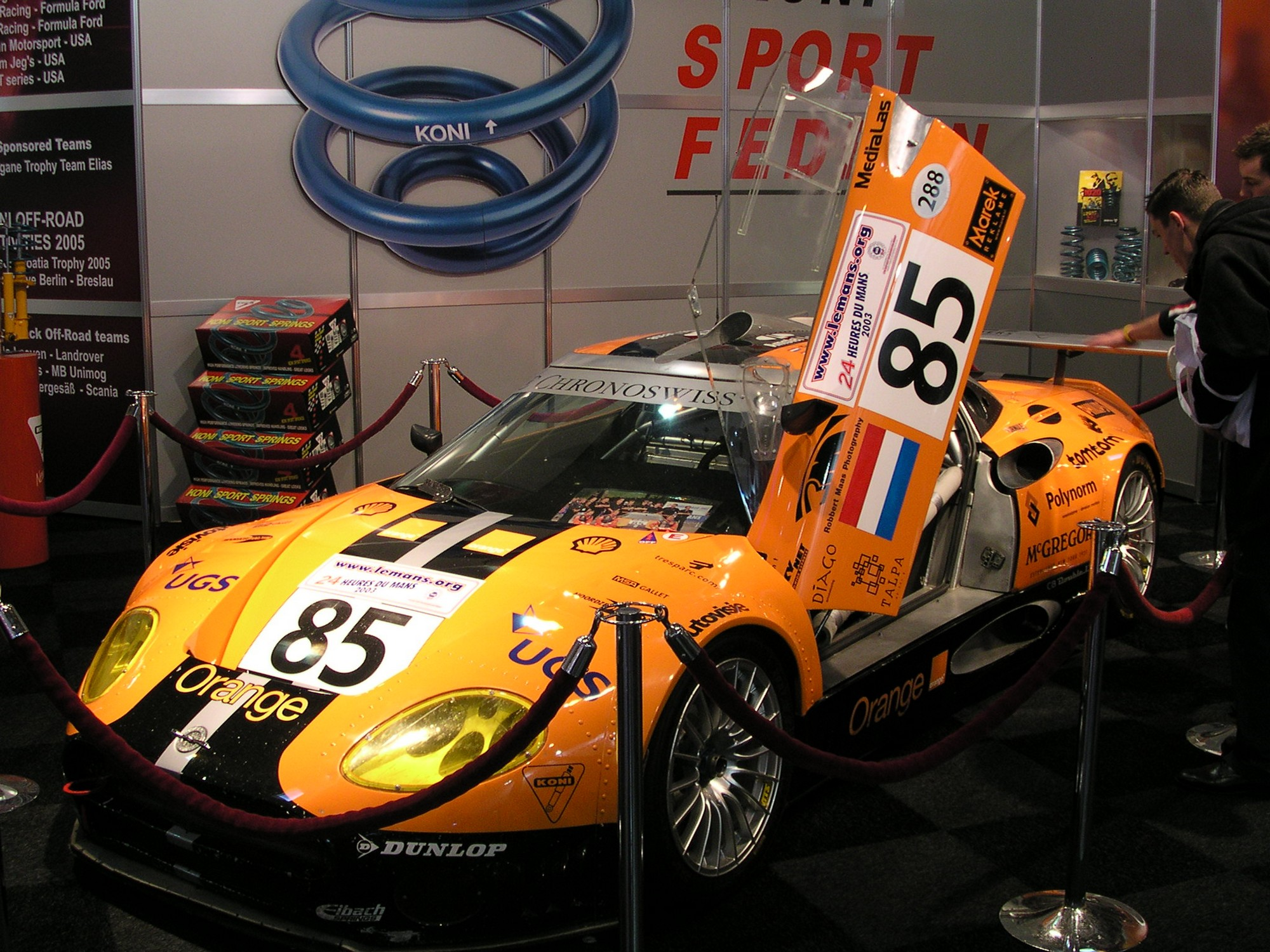
- Founded: 2001
- Founder(s): Spyker Cars N.V.
- Folded: 2011
- Base: Zeewolde, Flevoland
- Team principal(s): Peter van Erp; Ronald van de Laar
- Former series: FIA GT Championship; European Le Mans Series; American Le Mans Series; Aurum 1006 km
- Noted drivers: (Netherlands) Peter Kox (Netherlands) Tom Coronel (Netherlands) Peter van Merksteijn Sr. (Netherlands) Donny Crevels (Netherlands) Jeroen Bleekemolen (Netherlands) Mike Hezemans (United Kingdom) Jonny Kane (United Kingdom) Peter Dumbreck (Italy) Andrea Belicchi (Switzerland) Andrea Chiesa (Italy) Alex Caffi (Czech Republic) Jaroslav Janiš (Germany) Ralf Kelleners (Russia) Alexey Vasilyev (Lithuania) Jonas Gelžinis
- Teams' Championships: 2008 Aurum 1006 km
- Drivers' Championships: 2008 Aurum 1006 km

The Spyker Squadron was the factory racing team from Dutch sportscar manufacturer Spyker Cars. The team raced in various endurance championships and non-championship races from 2002 to 2010. Daily operations were managed by Peter van Erp, the later Spyker Cars COO.

== History ==
=== Spyker C8 Double-12R ===
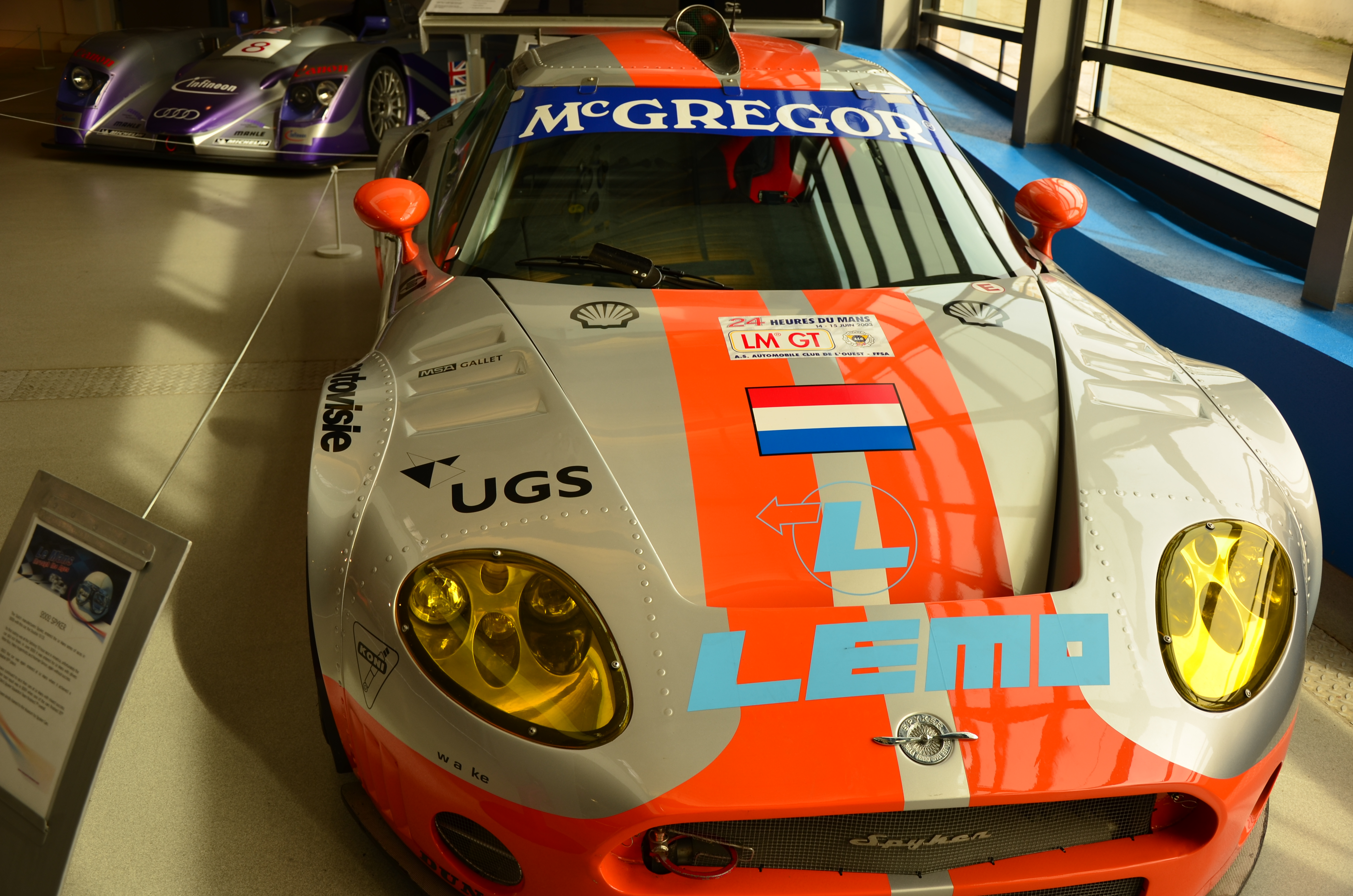
The Spyker C8 Double-12R at the Coventry Transport Museum in 2011

Reiter Engineering developed the Spyker C8 Double-12R to compete in the 2002 24 Hours of Le Mans GT class. The team debuted the car at the 2002 12 Hours of Sebring with Derek Hill, Peter Kox and Hans Hugenholtz. The team retired after four hours due to accident damage. At the 24 Hours of Le Mans the team retired over halfway through the race. A valve problem in the BMW engine caused the retirement.

The C8 Double-12R was again raced in 2003. Engine trouble again hampered their 12 Hours of Sebring effort. The team retired just past the half way mark. Sponsored by telecom provider Orange S.A. the team presented drivers Tom Coronel, Hans Hugenholtz and Norman Simon. Gearbox trouble prevented a strong finish, the team finished the race but was not classified as it was to far behind. The team also entered the lone race of the 2003 Le Mans Series, the 1000km of Le Mans. Norman Simon, joined by Belgian Patrick van der Schoote, finished the race in 25th place overall.

=== Spyker C8 Spyder GT2-R ===
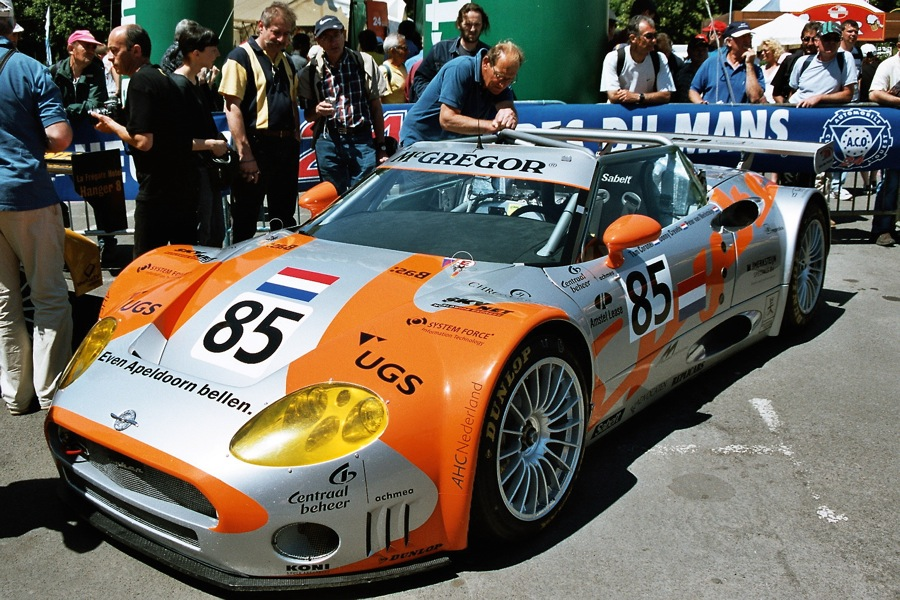
The Spyker C8 GT2-R at the 2006 24 Hours of Le Mans

In 2004 the team focused on developing a new variant on the C8, the C8 Spyder GT2-R. The car debuted at the 2005 24 Hours of Le Mans. The Audi powered car failed to finish the race due to an engine fire almost seven hours into the race. The team returned at the 1000km of Nürburgring, the fourth round of the 2005 Le Mans Series season. Drivers Jeroen Bleekemolen and Donny Crevels finished eighteenth overall, second in the GT2 class. The team finished in the same lap as the class winning Porsche 996 GT3. Near the end of the year the team made its debut in the FIA GT Championship. Racing at Zhuhai and Dubai the team scored two top five class finishes. At Dubai the team finished third in class.

For 2006 the Spyder was fitted with a roof. The team entered the full 2006 Le Mans Series. The team's best result was a sixteenth place overall, third in class, at the 1000km of Jarama. Both Spykers entered the 2006 24 Hours of Le Mans, but both did not finish. In the 2006 Spa 24 Hours the team fought for a fourth place in class most of the race, before having to settle for tenth.

The team scaled down to a single car for the 2007 season. In the Le Mans Series, drivers Mike Hezemans and Peter Dumbreck scored a third place in class finish at the 1000km of Silverstone. At the 24 Hours of Le Mans the team did not finish the race. An engine problem seven hours into the race stopped the car at Tetre Rouge.

In 2008 the car won its final race, the 1000 kilometrų lenktynės with Jonas Gelžinis, Ralf Kelleners, Peter Dumbreck and Alexey Vasilyev.

=== Spyker C8 Laviolette GT2-R ===
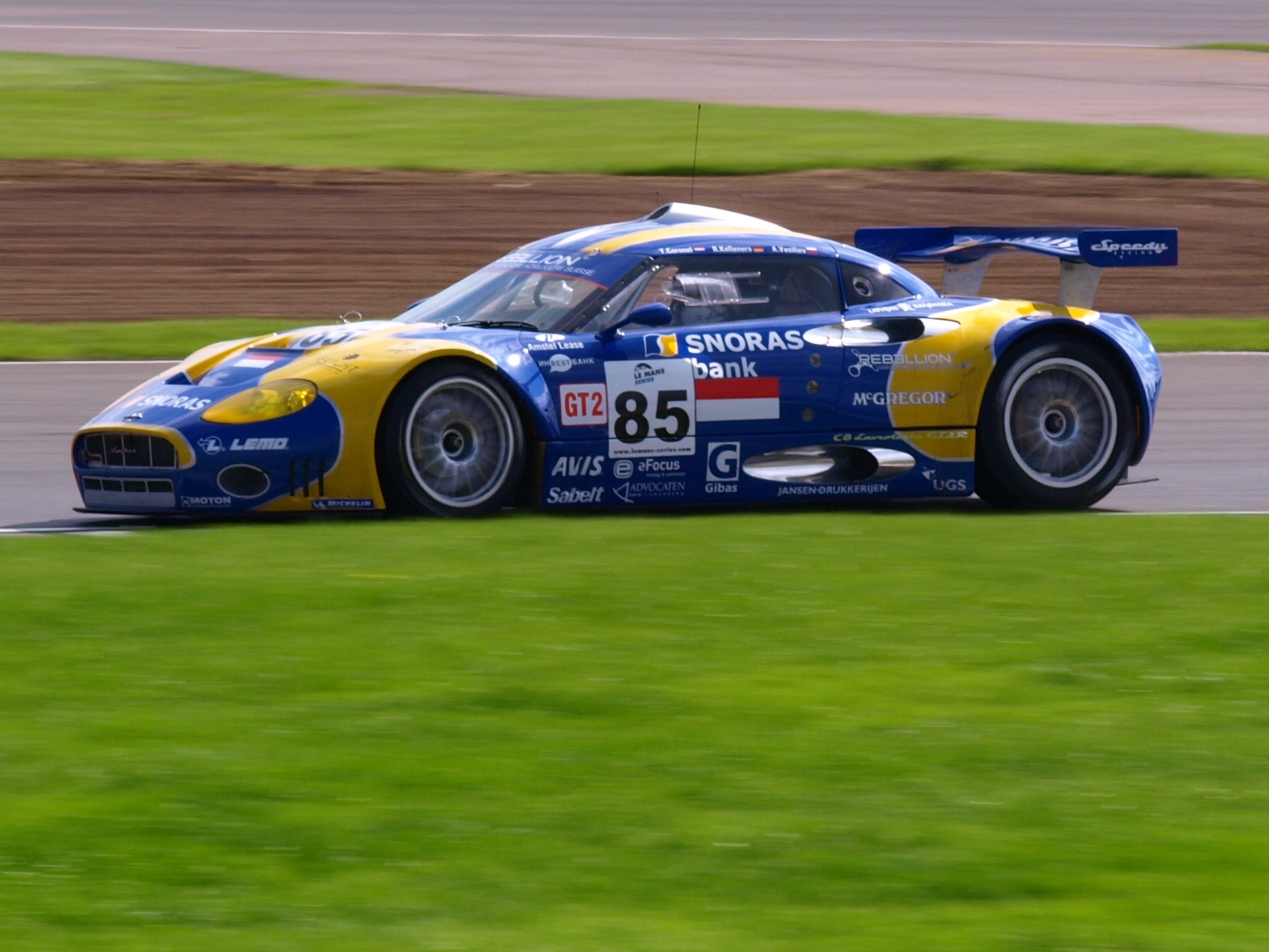
Spyker C8 Laviolette GT2-R

Introducing the C8 Laviolette GT2-R in 2008 the team did not finish the 24 Hours of Le Mans. Three fourth-place finishes in the 2008 Le Mans Series placed the team third in the constructors championship. Despite the main company moving to Coventry, the racing team remained in Zeewolde. The team repeated its performance feat in 2009. The team even scored to second in class finishes at the 1000km of Nürburgring and the 1000km of Silverstone. At the 24 Hours of Le Mans the team finished the race. Drivers Tom Coronel, Jeroen Bleekemolen and Jaroslav Janiš finished the Snoras-sponsored car in fifth place in class. Snoras became a major stakeholder in the Spyker Cars company.

In 2010 the team again entered the Le Mans Series as well as the 24 Hours of Le Mans. The team again finished the prestigious sports car race, as the last classified car. The team finished in 27th place, 117 laps behind the overall winning car.

=== Spyker C8 Aileron GTE ===
In 2011 the team took a sabbatical to develop the C8 Aileron to race in 2012. But as the major shareholder Snoras filed for bankruptcy and a deal with its owner Vladimir Antonov fell through, the team folded.

== Racing record ==
=== 24 Hours of Le Mans results ===
Year	Entrant	No.	Car	Drivers	Class	Laps	Pos.	Class Pos.
2002	(Netherlands) Spyker Automobielen B.V.	85	Spyker C8 Double-12R	(Netherlands) Hans Hugenholtz (Netherlands) Peter Kox (Germany) Norman Simon	LMGT	142	DNF	DNF
2003	(Netherlands) ST Team Orange Spyker	85	Spyker C8 Double-12R	(Netherlands) Tom Coronel (Netherlands) Hans Hugenholtz (Germany) Norman Simon	LMGT	229	NC	NC
2005	(Netherlands) Spyker Squadron B.V.	85	Spyker C8 Spyder GT2-R	(Netherlands) Tom Coronel (Netherlands) Donny Crevels (Netherlands) Peter van Merksteijn Sr.	LMGT2	76	DNF	DNF
2006	(Netherlands) Spyker Squadron B.V.	85	Spyker C8 Spyder GT2-R	(Netherlands) Tom Coronel (Netherlands) Donny Crevels (United Kingdom) Peter Dumbreck	LMGT2	40	DNF	DNF
2006	(Netherlands) Spyker Squadron B.V.	86	Spyker C8 Spyder GT2-R	(Netherlands) Jeroen Bleekemolen (Netherlands) Mike Hezemans (United Kingdom) Jonny Kane	LMGT2	202	DNF	DNF
2007	(Netherlands) Spyker Squadron B.V.	85	Spyker C8 Spyder GT2-R	(Italy) Andrea Belicchi (Italy) Alex Caffi (Switzerland) Andrea Chiesa	LMGT2	145	DNF	DNF
2007	(Netherlands) Spyker Squadron B.V.	86	Spyker C8 Spyder GT2-R	(Netherlands) Mike Hezemans (Czech Republic) Jaroslav Janiš (United Kingdom) Jonny Kane	LMGT2	70	DNF	DNF
2008	(Netherlands) Snoras Spyker Squadron	85	Spyker C8 Laviolette GT2-R	(United Kingdom) Peter Dumbreck (Germany) Ralf Kelleners (Russia) Alexey Vasilyev	LMGT2	43	DNF	DNF
2008	(Switzerland) Speedy Racing Team	94	Spyker C8 Laviolette GT2-R	(Switzerland) Iradj Alexander (Switzerland) Andrea Chiesa (Switzerland) Benjamin Leuenberger	LMGT2	72	DNF	DNF
2009	(Netherlands) Snoras Spyker Squadron	85	Spyker C8 Laviolette GT2-R	(Netherlands) Jeroen Bleekemolen (Netherlands) Tom Coronel (Czech Republic) Jaroslav Janiš	LMGT2	319	25th	5th
2010	(Netherlands) Spyker Squadron	85	Spyker C8 Laviolette GT2-R	(Netherlands) Jeroen Bleekemolen (Netherlands) Tom Coronel (United Kingdom) Peter Dumbreck	LMGT2	280	27th	9th

== Gallery ==
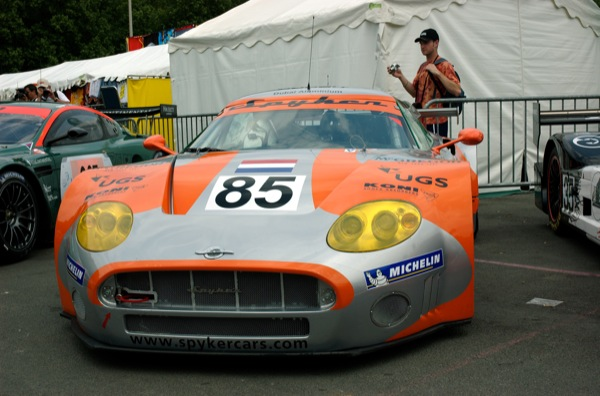
Spyker C8 Spyder GT2R at the 2006 24 Hours of Le mans.

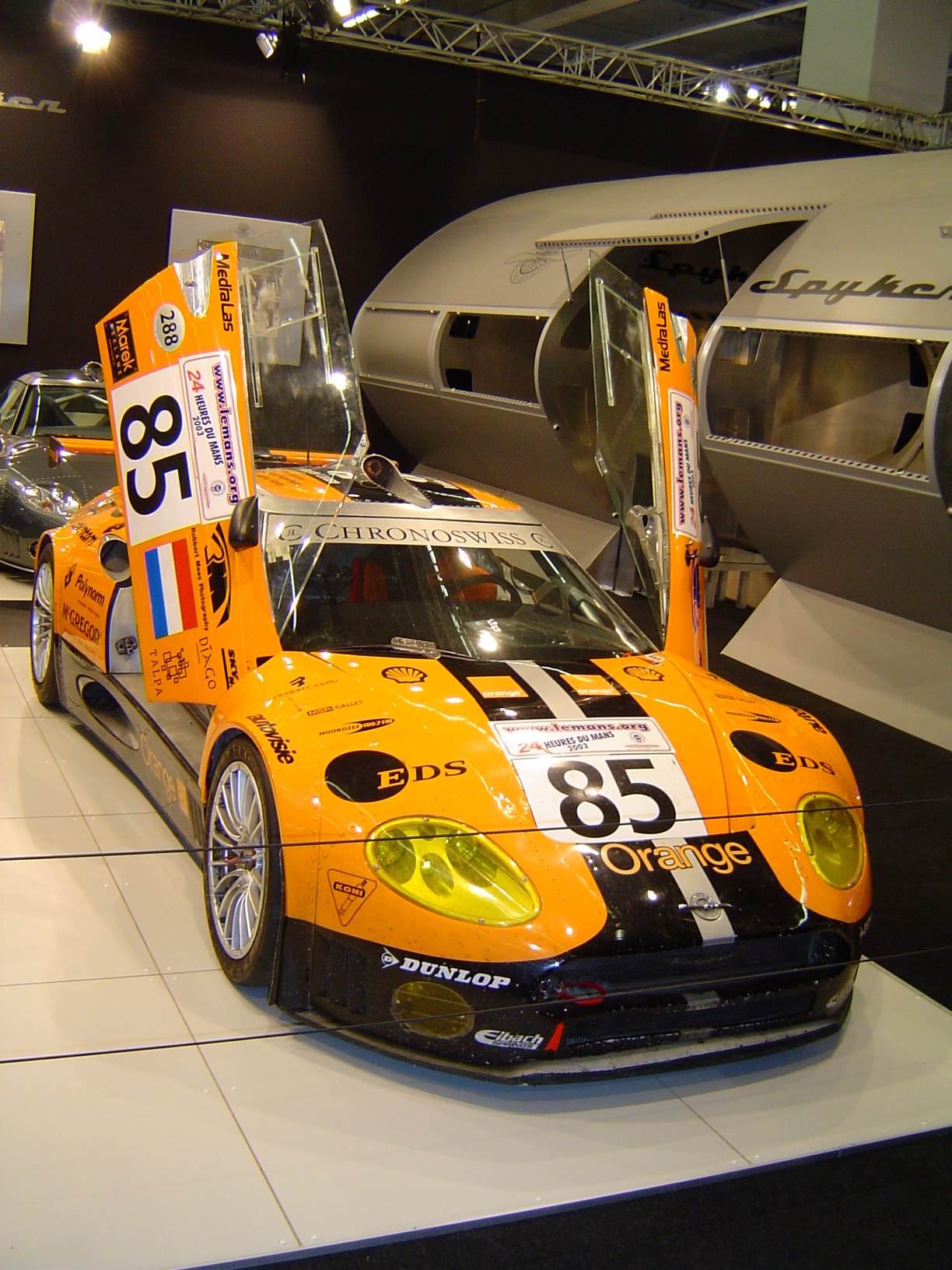
Spyker C8 Double-12R at the 2003 International Motor Show Germany.

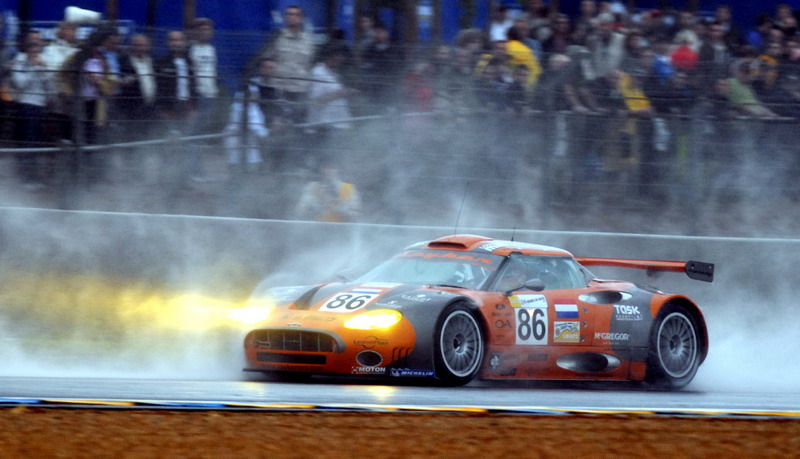
Spyker C8 Spyder GT2-R at the 2007 24 Hours of Le Mans

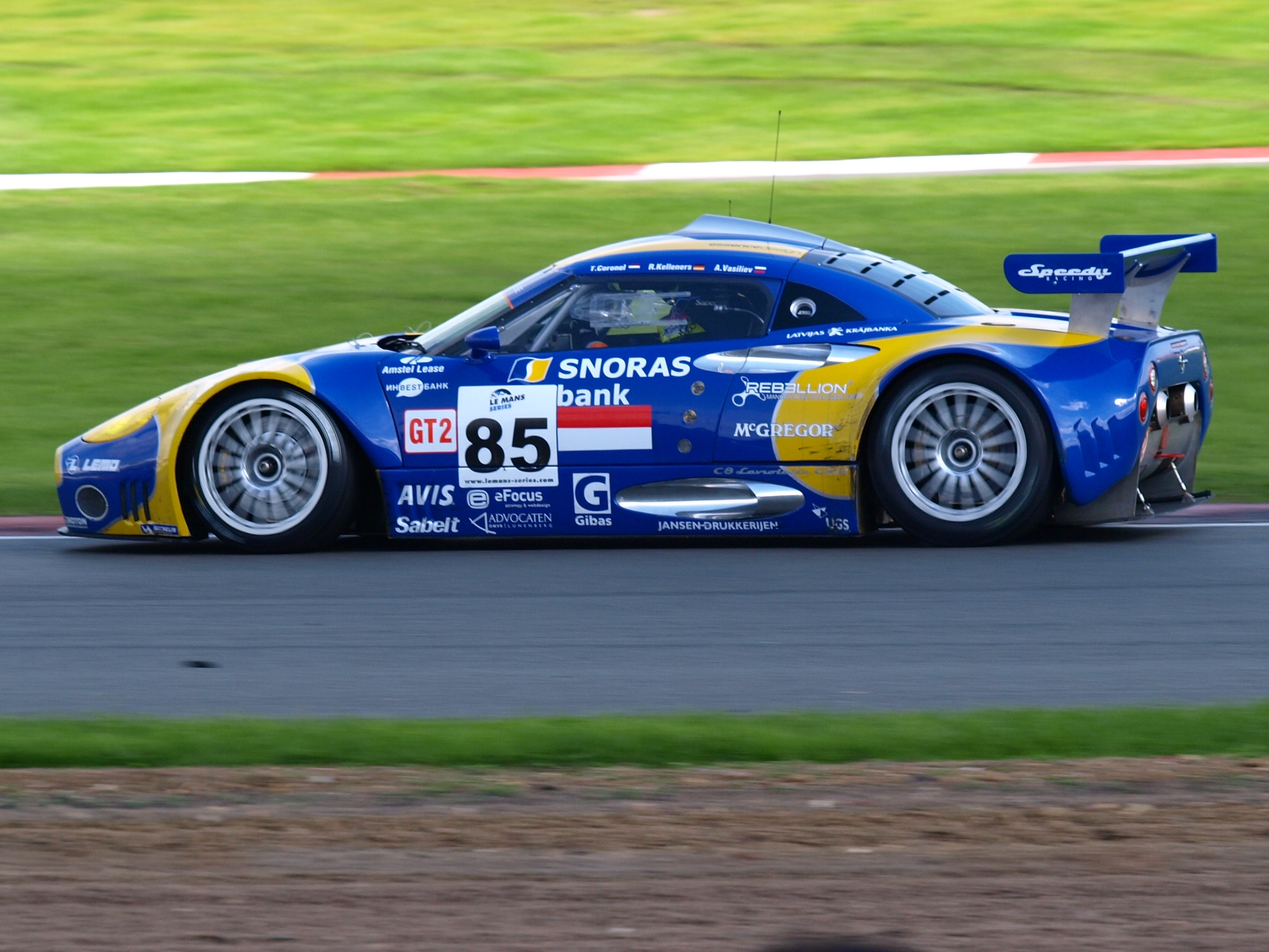
Spyker C8 Laviolette GT2-R at the 2008 1000 km of Silverstone.
