= 2015 ENEOS 1000 kilometrų lenktynės =

2015 ENEOS 1000 kilometru lenktynes (ENEOS 1000 km race) was a 16th running of ENEOS 1000 kilometrų lenktynės, a touring car and GT endurance racing event held in Lithuania, at Palanga circuit, 2 kilometers away from resort town Palanga on July 16–18, 2015.

Race was won by Jonas Gelžinis, Ignas Gelžinis and Tautvydas Barštys who drove for Juta-KG Group team. Nerijus Dagilis, Nemunas Dagilis and Robertas Kupčikas finished second for Balpol-15 min powered by Oktanas Racing and Steve Vanbellingen, Erik Qvick, Dirk Vanrompuy and Tom Vanrompuy took final podium position for Belgian Qvick Motors team.

== Background ==
For the first practice session, all teams were divided into two groups. 2013 ENEOS 1000 kilometrų lenktynės winners General Financing-Autopaslauga by Pitlane confirmed their favourite status, as Jeroen Bleekemolen went fastest in first practice session with a laptime of 1:12.796. Juta-KG Group and MOPTRANS-Club PORT by JR Motorsport also impressed with their speed, as they completed top three.

Algirdai Racing Team with Aquila CR1 was fastest in other group, but slower than Porsche of General Financing-Autopaslauga by Pitlane. Ramūnas Čapkauskas of Algirdai Racing Team damaged his car in the first practice session, but the team managed to repair it before the start of second practice session, where he showed best lap time of 1:12.920

"Blue Ghost Racing Team" driver Modestas Jakas crashed his Toyota Celica heavily in the second practice session. Luckily, he wasn't injured, but his team was forced to withdraw from the race.

== Qualifying ==
Jeroen Bleekemolen, who drove for General Financing - Autopaslauga by Pitlane, qualified on pole with best lap time of 1:09.679. Jonas Gelžinis from Juta Racing was second, less than half a second behind Jeroen Bleekemolen (Lap time 1:10.090). Algirdai Racing Team's Ramūnas Čapkauskas took third position, driving Aquila CR1 prototype (Lap Time 1:10.156).

Qualifying was red-flagged several times. At the end of the first phase of qualifying, Daniel Colembie went off the track and heavily damaged his BMW M4. His JR Motorsports teammate Simas Juodviršis also crashed, this time in top 10 shootout. Team was unable to rebuild both cars before the race, therefore Daniel Colembie and his co-drivers Michael Verhagen and Ward Sluys withdrawn from the race.

Some drivers were unable to improve their lap time due to crash of Simas Juodviršis, as qualification was cancelled early. Defending race winners, Liqui Moly Racing Team Lithuania, did not advance to top 10 shootout: Kazimieras Vasiliauskas qualified in 12th position.

=== Qualification: Top 10 shootout results ===
Pos	Class	No	Team	Drivers	Vehicle	Lap time
1	GT	52	General Financing - Autopaslauga by Pitlane	(Netherlands) Jeroen Bleekemolen	Porsche Carrera GT3 Cup	1:09.679
2	GT	71	Juta-KG Group	(Lithuania) Jonas Gelžinis	Porsche Carrera GT3 Cup	+0.411
3	X1	7	Algirdai Racing Team	(Lithuania) Ramūnas Čapkauskas	Aquila SR1	+0.477
4	GT	15	Balpol-15min powered by Oktanas Racing	(Lithuania) Robertas Kupčikas	Porsche Carrera GT3 Cup	+2.165
5	X1	45	MOPTRANS-Club PORT by JR Motorsport	(Lithuania) Simas Juodviršis	BMW M4	+2.168
6	GT	8	RaceTech	(Lithuania) Marius Slaboševičius	BMW M3 GT2	+2.616
7	A3000+	21	Palanga SPA hotel by Qvick Motors	(Belgium) Erik Qvick	BMW M3 GTR	+5.509
8	GT	51	Finance Group – GSR	(Lithuania) Rokas Steponavičius	Ginetta G50 GT4	+6.754
9	D	92	RIMO	(Lithuania) Martynas Samuitis	BMW 335D	+7.462
10	X1	19	MOJO Lounge Racing by JR Motorsport	(United States) Daniel Colembie	BMW M4	no time

== Race ==
Jeroen Bleekemolen led early stages of the race, as Jonas Gelžinis and Robertas Kupčikas closely followed him in second and third. Ramūnas Čapkauskas retired from the race after only 50 laps due electronic failure of his Aquila CR1 prototype. 70 laps into the race unexpected heavy rain caught many fast drivers, including Dainius Matijošaitis with BMW M4, Edvinas Arkušauskas with BMW E90 EDVA, Marius Steponavičius with BMW M3 GT2 and Arūnas Mrazauskas with Lexus IS-F, who crashed heavily. Only Mrazauskas was able to continue the race after lengthy repairs in pitlane, as all other drivers retired. Due to crashes, safety car was deployed several times.

Rain stopped only 100 laps later. As the race track began to dry, two race-leading Porsches took a gamble and pitted for slick tyres. However, the risk didn't paid off as the rain started to fall again. Both cars stayed on track on slick tyres as Jeroen Bleekemolen and Ignas Gelžinis hoped that the rain will stop soon. However, this was a crucial mistake for Bleekemolen, who missed a breaking point on the wet track and crashed into the barriers. He managed to return to pitlane for repairs, but lost 14 laps and the race lead in the process.

Battle for the lead continued between Juta-KG Group and Balpol-15min powered by Oktanas Racing, as the two teams were separated by only a few seconds during majority of the second part of the race. However, 30 laps until the end of the race Nerijus Dagilis ran out of fuel and was forced to stop at the track. His Porsche was pulled back to pitlane, but after this mistake his team lost 6 laps and all chances to win a race. That left Ignas Gelžinis comfortably in front. For the final stint he handed the car over to Tautvydas Barštys, who easily crossed the finish line in first place. This was first win for Tautvydas Barštys in 1000 kilometrų lenktynės, second win for Ignas Gelžinis, and a record-breaking fifth win for Jonas Gelžinis.

Former Formula 1 drover Michael Bleekemolen and his co-driver Rene Steenmetz was running fifth as the race was coming to an end. However, after mechanical problems with his Renault Clio he was forced to retire from the race when only six laps were remaining. In the process, he dropped to sixth place, as all other drivers were six laps behind.

=== Race results ===
Class winners in bold.

Pos	Class	No	Team	Drivers	Vehicle	Laps
1	**GT**	**71**	**Juta-KG Group**	**(Lithuania) Jonas Gelžinis (Lithuania) Ignas Gelžinis (Lithuania) Tautvydas Barštys**	**Porsche 911 GT3 Cup**	**373**
2	GT	15	Balpol-15min powered by Oktanas Racing	(Lithuania) Nerijus Dagilis (Lithuania) Nemunas Dagilis (Lithuania) Robertas Kupčikas	Porsche 911 GT3 Cup	369
3	**A3000+**	**21**	**Palanga SPA hotel by Qvick Motors**	**(Belgium) Steve Vanbellingen (Belgium) Erik Qvick (Belgium) Dirk van Rompuy (Belgium) Tom van Rompuy**	**BMW M3 GTR**	**363**
4	GT	51	Finance Group – GSR	(Lithuania) Arūnas Granskas (Lithuania) Rokas Steponavičius (Lithuania) Ernesta Globytė (Lithuania) Eugenijus Misiūra	Ginetta G50 GT4	352
5	A3000+	27	Bauer Racing	(Lithuania) Ramūnas Čapkauskas (Lithuania) Linas Adomavičius (Lithuania) Žilvinas Juršys (Lithuania) Tomas Šipkauskas	BMW M3	350
6	**A3000**	**25**	**Team Bleekemolen**	**(Netherlands) Michael Bleekemolen (Netherlands) Rene Steenmetz**	**Renault Clio**	**340**
7	GT	5	Luktarna	(Lithuania) Giedrius Notkus (Lithuania) Remigijus Devainis (Belarus) Yuri Pukhkyy	BMW M3	340
8	**D**	**18**	**ALWARK-Kaukas**	**(Lithuania) Kęstutis Binkauskas (Lithuania) Karolis Šikšnelis (Lithuania) Marius Masiulionis (Lithuania) Igoris Ivanovas**	**Volkswagen Golf**	**334**
9	GT	52	General Financing - Autopaslauga by Pitlane	(Lithuania) Benediktas Vanagas (Netherlands) Jeroen Bleekemolen (Netherlands) Sebastiaan Bleekemolen	Porsche Carrera GT3 Cup	333
10	A3000	54	Autoverslas Racing Team	(Lithuania) Valdemaras Zakarauskas (Lithuania) Rimgaudas Statnickas (Lithuania) Andrejus Teras (Lithuania) Vytenis Gulbinas	Audi A4	329
11	**A2000**	**55**	**Autoklubas AB ALYTAUS CHEMIJA**	**(Lithuania) Karolis Blėdis (Lithuania) Arūnas Lekavičius (Lithuania) Tomas Isiūnas**	**Renault Clio Sport**	**329**
12	A2000	14	SIUSKPIGIAU.LT – ZAIBELIS	(Lithuania) Ignas Palaima (Lithuania) Ignas Brusokas (Lithuania) Mantas Gasiūnas	Honda Integra Type R	328
13	A2000	23	JP Sport – Transprofus	(Lithuania) Jonas Pipiras (Lithuania) Mantas Morkis (Lithuania) Jonas Paukštė (Lithuania) Gintaras Morkevičius	Honda Civic Type R	328
14	GT	1	Skinest Rail Kaminera	(Lithuania) Arūnas Tuma (Lithuania) Tomas Petraitis (Poland) Oleg Ossinovski (Russia) Mikolai Sobol	BMW M3	328
15	D	36	Cor Euser Racing	(United States) Hal Prewitt (United States) Jim Briody (Netherlands) Cor Euser	BMW M3	326
16	A3000	24	Alfa Romeo klubas	(Lithuania) Rimvydas Agurkis (Lithuania) Giedrius Čenkus (Lithuania) Alminas Malaiška	Alfa Romeo GT	326
17	A2000	90	MK Technika Rally	(Lithuania) Gintautas Šlepikas (Lithuania) Alfredas Griškonis (Lithuania) Silverijus Lapėnas (Lithuania) Audronis Gulbinas	Honda Civic Type R	325
18	A3000+	53	Dynam!:t Energy	(Lithuania) Mantas Matukaitis (Lithuania) Tadas Aganauskas (Lithuania) Aistė Antanaitytė (Australia) Molly Taylor	BMW M3	323
19	A3000	89	Helios sport – Pirelli Key point	(Lithuania) Redas Navalinskas (Lithuania) Vaidotas Mitkus (Lithuania) Karolis Gedgaudas (Lithuania) Artūras Radinis	BMW 325i	321
20	A3000+	10	Techninis Projektas	(Lithuania) Aurimas Šiaulys (Lithuania) Tadas Petronis (Lithuania) Vygandas Urbanas (Lithuania) Mindaugas Urbanas	Mitsubishi Lancer EVO IX	321
21	A3000	99	Rednut	(Estonia) Rene Tunder (Estonia) Kren Tunder (Estonia) Kasmar Tunder	BMW 325	311
22	A3000+	58	Rotoma Racing	(Lithuania) Robertas Graudinis (Lithuania) Mindaugas Boguševičius (Lithuania) Linas Vaškys	BMW M3	304
23	**X1**	**4**	**Kauno automobilininkų sporto klubas**	**(Lithuania) Dovilas Čiutelė (Lithuania) Aurimas Mištautas (Germany) Conrad Rüdiger (Lithuania) Tomas Šutinis**	**Lada 2104 Turbo**	**301**
24	A3000	33	Domus Lumina	(Lithuania) Mantas Jančauskas (Lithuania) Gediminas Vilimas (Lithuania) Mindaugas Liatukas (Netherlands) Kevin Abbring	BMW E36 Compact	292
25	X1	68	EBMotorsport	(Lithuania) Egidijus Bulotas (Lithuania) Gediminas Udras	Porsche 968EBR	291
26	D	31	AEGN Engineering-Telšių Statyba	(Lithuania) Giedrius Nomeika (Lithuania) Audrius Kirklys (Lithuania) Gvidas Aukštuolis (Lithuania) Artūras Ežerskis	BMW 120D	275
27	D	81	Kaukas	(Lithuania) Igoris Ivanovas (Lithuania) Kęstutis Vilkas (Lithuania) Martynas Giknius (Lithuania) Sigitas Ambrazevičius	Volkswagen Golf	253
28	X1	79	DFDSDHR	(United Kingdom) Andrew Holland (United Kingdom) Michael Holland (United Kingdom) David Holland	Ford Zak	234
29	A3000+	20	Nero Racing	(Lithuania) Nerijus Malasevičius (Sweden) Tobbe Söderberg (Sweden) Kent Persson (Lithuania) Mindaugas Varža	BMW M3	224
30	D	11	Sparti reklama Racing Team	(Lithuania) Rimas Cesiulis (Lithuania) Almantas Sadauskas (Lithuania) Karolis Staniulynas	BMW 120D	219
31	A3000+	77	EVO performance	(Lithuania) Vytas Bilinskas (Lithuania) Kiril Ososov (Lithuania) Martynas Gediminas	Porsche Cayman	200
32	A2000	88	AUTOMANAI	(Lithuania) Marius Miškūnas (Lithuania) Mantas Miškūnas (Lithuania) Edvinas Mardosas	Honda Civic	196
33	GT	12	Orion Racing Team	(Lithuania) Rytis Garbaravičius (Lithuania) Marijus Mazuch (Lithuania) Gediminas Ramonas	BMW M3	165
34	X1	66	Domus Lumina by Samsonasracing.com	(Lithuania) Martynas Samsonas (Netherlands) Kevin Abbring (Lithuania) Mindaugas Varža (Lithuania) Egidijus Valeiša	Samsonasracing Kit Car	135
35	A3000+	22	222	(Lithuania) Igoris Sidunovas (Lithuania) Linas Puzonas (Lithuania) Eugenijus Misiūra (Lithuania) Audrius Gricius	Volkswagen New Beelte RSI	105
36	D	92	RIMO	(Lithuania) Rimantas Blažulionis (Lithuania) Saulius Vitkauskas (Lithuania) Martynas Samuitis	BMW 335D	104
37	GT	96	Lexus Team LT	(Lithuania) Artūras Mrazauskas (Lithuania) Dainius Kablys (Lithuania) Darius Baltramiejūnas	Lexus IS-F	90
–	X1	45	MOPTRANS-Club PORT by JR Motorsport	(Lithuania) Dainius Matijošaitis (Lithuania) Andrius Jasionauskas (Lithuania) Simas Juodviršis	BMW M4	82
–	A3000+	8	Liqui Moly Racing Team Lithuania	(Lithuania) Edvinas Arkušauskas (Lithuania) Justas Tamašauskas (Lithuania) Kazimieras Vasiliauskas	BMW E90 EDVA	65
–	GT	8	RaceTech	(Netherlands) Dennis de Groot (Lithuania) Marius Slaboševičius (Lithuania) Džiugas Tovilavičius (Lithuania) Egidijus Valeiša	BMW M3 GT2	46
–	X1	7	Algirdai Racing Team	(Lithuania) Ramūnas Čapkauskas (Lithuania) Deividas Jocius (Lithuania) Vytautas Švedas	Aquila SR1	18
–	A3000+	19	VIPTUNING	(Latvia) Artjoms Koclamazasvili (Latvia) Elvis Turans (Latvia) Agris Petrovskis	BMW E90	12
NC	X1	19	MOJO Lounge Racing by JR Motorsport	(Belgium) Ward Sluys (United States) Daniel Colembie (Netherlands) Michael Verhagen	BMW M4	DNS
NC	X1	44	Blue Ghost Racing Team	(Lithuania) Benediktas Černauskas (Lithuania) Virginijus Lukšas (Lithuania) Modestas Jakas	Toyota Celica	DNS
