= Juta Racing =

Lithuanian auto racing team

- Founded: 1990
- Team principal(s): Audrius Gelžinis
- Current series: Porsche Carrera Cup Great Britain; Lithuanian Rally Championship; TCR Europe Touring Car Series; ADAC TCR Germany Touring Car Championship
- Former series: Volkswagen Castrol Cup; Renault Clio Cup United Kingdom; Porsche GT3 Cup Challenge Central Europe
- Noted drivers: Ignas Gelžinis; Jonas Gelžinis; Tautvydas Barštys; Vytautas Švedas; Nerijus Dagilis

Juta Racing is an auto racing team based in Kaunas, Lithuania. Founded in 1988, the team currently racing in Porsche Carrera Cup Great Britain. Juta Racing is also strong competitor in domestic championships and races, including Lithuanian Rally Championship and annual 1000 km race near Palanga, at Palanga circuit, where the team claimed overall and GT class victory with its drivers Jonas Gelžinis, Ignas Gelžinis and Tautvydas Barštys in 2015.

== Team history ==
=== 1988–present: Kart Racing and rallying ===
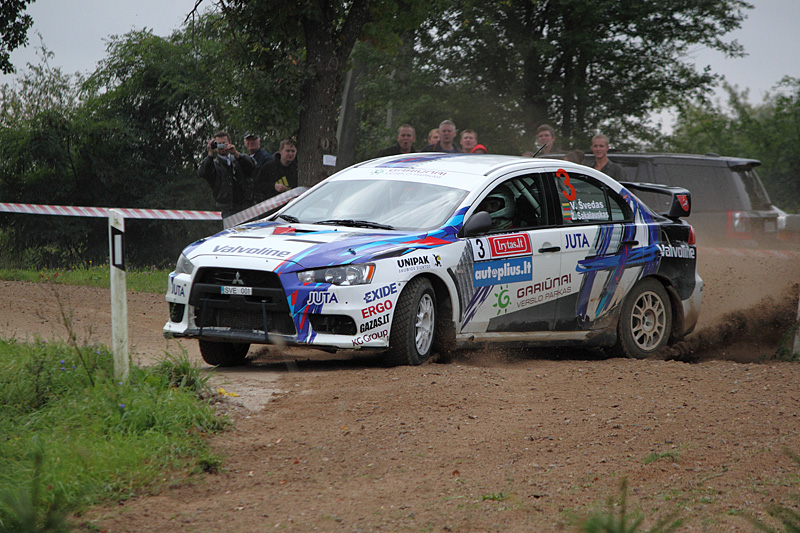
Švedas's EVO X from 2011

Founded in 1988, "Juta Racing" is one of the oldest racing teams in Lithuania which still exists to present day. In 1997 Kart Racing academy was established when young drivers development became one of the major team priorities. In 2002 team returned to domestic rally championship, enjoying great success and taking multiple wins and championships with driver Vytautas Švedas. Since 2006 "Juta Racing" also participated in several WRC and ERC rounds. In 2013 Rally Liepāja–Ventspils Vytautas Švedas finished eight overall and first in "Production Cup".

=== 2007–2009: Porsche Carrera Cup Scandinavia ===
In 2007 "Juta Racing" made its debut in "Porsche Carrera Cup Scandinacvia". Jonas Gelžinis, who was the only driver of the team, scored 12 points and took 13th place in final standings. In the following year "Juta Racing" enjoyed greater success with Jonas, who scored 131 points and took 7th place in final standings. Tautvydas Barštys also made his debut, scoring 7 points and taking 30th place in final standings.

2009 season was even more successful. Jonas Gelžinis scored 269 points, including one second-place finish, and took 5th place in final standings. Tautvydas Barštys moved up to 21st place in final standings, scoring 56 points.

=== 2010–2013: Porsche Carrera Cup Great Britain ===
After successful 2009 Porsche Carrera Cup season in Scandinavia, in 2010 "Juta Racing" moved to Porsche Carrera Cup Great Britain, participating in "Pro-AM1" class. Jonas Gelžinis demonstrated stable results thorough the season and scored 143 points. This was enough to take 10th place in overall standings and 3rd in "Pro-AM1" class. Tautvydas Barštys failed to score a point and was left in 28th place in overall standings.

In 2011 Jonas Gelžinis and Tautvydas Barštys continued to drive for the team. While Jonas Gelžinis stayed in "Pro-AM1" class, Tautvydas Barštys moved to "Pro-AM2" class. Rytis Garbaravičius also made his debut for the team, participating in seventh round of the season in Knockhill. Jonas Gelžinis continued to impress and took 6th place in overall standings, scoring 167 points and became the winner of "Pro-AM1" class. Jonas also scored pole position in Donington, second round of the season, but during the race he was unable to defend this position from rivals who were driving more powerful cars. Fourth place finish was his best result of the season. Tautvydas Barštys, who contested only in four rounds, failed to score a point and took 29th place in overall standings.

After victory in "Pro-AM1" class, in 2012 "Juta Racing" and Jonas Gelžinis stepped up into "Pro" class. Team enjoyed immediate success, with Jonas Gelžinis taking four podium finishes in Brands Hatch and Donington. After setback in Thruxton, Jonas Gelžinis took four more podiums in Oulton Park and Croft Circuit. Second half of the season was less successful, Jonas Gelžiniswas disqualified from the first race in Snetterton and took only two podium finishes in Rockingham and Silverstone. "Juta Racing" ended the season with Jonas Gelžinis taking his and the team's first race victory in Porsche Carrera Cup Great Britain in the final round of the season, held in Brands Hatch. Jonas Gelžinis took 4th place in final standings with 259 points. Tautvydas Barštys contested in three rounds of the season, scoring 4 points and taking 24th place in overall standings: fourth in "Pro-AM2" class.

"Juta Racing" continued to demonstrate strong form in 2013, with Jonas Gelžinis finishing on podium in the first six races of the season and taking the championship lead. This was the first time in Porsche Carrera Cup Great Britain history when racing driver from outside United Kingdom had taken the lead in the standings. After unsuccessful weekend in Oulton Park Jonas Gelžinis lost championship lead to Michael Meadows, but then took three victories in a row in Croft Circuit and Snetterton. Jonas Gelžinis took four more podium finishes in the second half of the season and kept his championship hopes until the final round. However, he was unable to regain championship lead and ended the season in second place with 310 points – 15 points less than champion Michael Meadows.

=== 2012–2014: Renault Clio Cup United Kingdom and Volkswagen Castrol Cup ===
From 2012 to 2013 "Juta Racing" also competed in Renault Clio Cup United Kingdom. Ignas Gelžinis and Tautvydas Barštys represented the team. In his rookie year Ignas Gelžinis took 10th place in final standings with 152 points. Tautvydas Barštys, who combined his Renault Clio Cup campaign with Porsche Carrera Cup Great Britain that year, ended the season in 23rd place with 46 points.

2013 season was less successful: Ignas Gelžinis took 15th place in final standings with 106 points and Tautvydas Barštys took 22nd place with 38 points.

After leaving Porsche Carrera Cup Great Britain and moving to Porsche GT3 Cup Challenge Central Europe, "Juta Racing" also left Renault Clio Cup United Kingdom and entered Volkswagen Castrol Cup in 2014. Jonas Gelžinis and Tautvydas Barštys represented the team. After promising start of the season in Poznan Circuit, where Jonas Gelžinis finished third, the rest of the season was disappointing. Four fourth-place finishes was the best result for the team during the rest of the season. Jonas Gelžinis ended the season in 6th place with 368 points, while Tautvydas Barštys took 20th place with 68 points.

=== 2014: Porsche GT3 Cup Challenge Central Europe ===
In 2014, "Juta Racing" moved to Porsche GT3 Cup Challenge Central Europe. Ignas Gelžinis stepped up from Renault Clio Cup United Kingdom and took his brother's Jonas Gelžinis place in Porsche. Polish driver Adam Gladysz also joined the team. After difficult start of the season in Hungaroring, Ignas Gelžinis scored his first podium finish in second round of the season in Poznan Circuit, finishing both races in top three. The following round in Salzburgring was even more successful. Ignas Gelžinis took his first victory with Porsche in the second race of the weekend. Adam Gladysz also claimed victory in Salzburgring and took the championship lead. In the following round at Autodrom Most, Ignas Gelžinis finished on podium twice and moved into third place in the standings. Adam Gladysz finished both races behind top ten due to mechanical failures and lost his championship lead in the process. More podium finishes came in fifth round at Slovakiaring and victory in Poznan Circuit allowed Ignas Gelžinis to move to second place in the standings. Two second-place finishes in final round of the season was not enough to win the championship and Ignas Gelžinis ended the season in second place with 218 points, 18 points less than winner Stefan Bilinski. Adam Gladysz after unsuccessful second half of the season ended in fourth place with 211 points.

=== 2015–present: return to Porsche Carrera Cup Great Britain ===
In 2015, "Juta Racing" returned to Porsche Carrera Cup Great Britain. Ignas Gelžinis represented the team in "Pro-AM1", while Tautvydas Barštys and newcomer Nerijus Dagilis competed in "Pro-AM2" class. Gelžinis won a "Pro-AM1" class title in his rookie years, while Dagilis and Barštys finished second and fifth respectively in "Pro-AM2" class.

== Racing record ==
=== Complete WRC results ===
Year	Car	No	Driver	1	2	3	4	5	6	7	8	9	10	11	12	13	14	15	WDC	Points	TC	Points	
2006	Mitsubishi Lancer EVO IX	76	Vytautas Švedas	MON	SWE	MEX	ESP	FRA	ARG	ITA	GRE	GER	FIN; Ret	JPN	CYP	TUR	AUS	NZL	GBR	–	0	–	0
2007	Mitsubishi Lancer EVO IX	85	Vytautas Švedas	MON	SWE	NOR	MEX	POR	ARG	ITA	GRE	FIN; Ret	GER	NZL	ESP	FRA	JPN	IRE	GBR	–	0	–	0
2008	Mitsubishi Lancer EVO IX	68/80	Vytautas Švedas	MON	SWE; Ret	MEX	ARG	JOR	ITA	GRE	TUR	FIN; Ret	GER	NZL	ESP	FRA	JPN	GBR		–	0	–	0
2009	Mitsubishi Lancer EVO IX	70	Vytautas Švedas	IRE	NOR	CYP	POR	ARG	ITA	GRE	POL; 15	FIN	AUS	ESP	GBR					–	0	–	0
2014	Mitsubishi Lancer EVO X	84	Vytautas Švedas	MON	SWE	MEX	POR	ARG	ITA	POL; 36	FIN	GER	AUS	FRA	ESP	GBR				–	0	–	0

=== Complete ERC results ===
Year	Car	No	Driver	1	2	3	4	5	6	7	8	9	10	11	12	WDC	Points	TC	Points
2006	Mitsubishi Lancer EVO IX	24	Vytautas Švedas	ITA	TUR	POL; Ret	BEL	BUL	POR	CZE	GRE	FRA				–	0	–	0
2013	Mitsubishi Lancer EVO X	9/25	Vytautas Švedas	AUT	LAT; 8	ESP	POR	FRA	BEL	ROM	CZE	POL; Ret	CRO	ITA	SWI	49	11	–	11
2014	Mitsubishi Lancer EVO X	6	Vytautas Švedas	AUT	LAT; Ret	GRE	IRE	POR	BEL	EST	CZE	CYP	ROM	SWI	FRA	–	0	–	0
