= 2012 Porsche Carrera Cup Great Britain =

The 2012 Porsche Carrera Cup Great Britain was a multi-event, one make motor racing championship held across England and Scotland. The championship featured a mix of professional motor racing teams and privately funded drivers, competing in Porsche 911 GT3 cars that conform to the technical regulations for the championship. It is a multi class championship, with drivers grouped based on their ability and experience into three classes: Professional, Professional-Amateur 1 (Pro-Am 1)and Professional-Amateur 2 (Pro-Am 2). It forms part of the extensive program of support categories built up around the BTCC centrepiece.

This season was the tenth Porsche Carrera Cup Great Britain. The season commenced on 1 April at Brands Hatch – on the circuit's Indy configuration – and concluded on 21 October at the same venue, utilising the Grand Prix circuit, after twenty races to be held at ten meetings, all in support of the 2012 British Touring Car Championship.

== Entry list ==
The official entry list was released on 13 March, including 21 full-season entries.

Team	No.	Driver	Rounds
Redline Racing	0	(United Kingdom) Michael Meadows	All
Redline Racing	00	(United Kingdom) Glynn Geddie	1–7
Redline Racing	1	(United Kingdom) James Sutton	8–10
Team Parker Racing	5	(United Kingdom) Richard Plant	All
Team Parker Racing	7	(United Kingdom) Sam Tordoff	All
Team Parker Racing	18	(United Kingdom) Andy Meyrick	6–10
Team Parker Racing	23	(United Kingdom) Daniel Lloyd	All
Juta Racing	8	(Lithuania) Jonas Gelžinis	All
Parr Motorsport	20	(United Kingdom) Ben Barker	All
Parr Motorsport	49	(United Kingdom) Chris Dymond	1, 3
Celtic Speed	45	(United Kingdom) Rory Butcher	All
Pro-Am 1
Celtic Speed	11	(United Kingdom) George Brewster	1, 3, 5, 7, 9–10
Team Parker Racing	17	(Republic of Ireland) Michael Leonard	1–2, 4, 6
Team Parker Racing	24	(United Kingdom) Derek Pierce	All
Redline Racing	25	(Spain) Víctor Jiménez	All
Redline Racing	29	(Turkey) Yücel Özbek	1–8
Redline Racing	77	(Oman) Ahmad Al Harthy	All
Redline Racing	99	(United Kingdom) Keith Webster	1–3, 6–7, 9–10
Parr Motorsport	36	(Republic of Ireland) Karl Leonard	2, 4
GT Marques	70	(United Kingdom) Oliver Mortimer	All
Pro-Am 2
SIBSport	15	(Australia) Tania Mann	1–3, 6–7
Juta Racing	19	(Lithuania) Tautvydas Barštys	1, 4–5
Speedlover	27	(Belgium) Jean Glorieux	1
GT Marques	47	(United Kingdom) Fraser O'Brien	6
Parr Motorsport	55	(United Kingdom) Richard Denny	9–10
Goff Racing	59	(United Kingdom) Will Goff	1, 4–6, 8–10

== Race calendar and results ==
On 20 September 2011, the British Touring Car Championship announced the race calendar for the 2012 season, for all of the series competing on the TOCA package. All races were held in the United Kingdom.

Round		Circuit	Date	Pole position	Fastest lap	Winning driver	Winning team
1	R1	Brands Hatch (Indy), Kent	31 March	(United Kingdom) Michael Meadows	(United Kingdom) Michael Meadows	(United Kingdom) Richard Plant	Team Parker Racing
1	R2	Brands Hatch (Indy), Kent	1 April	(United Kingdom) Michael Meadows	(United Kingdom) Richard Plant	(United Kingdom) Michael Meadows	Redline Racing
2	R3	Donington Park (National), Leicestershire	15 April	(United Kingdom) Michael Meadows	(Lithuania) Jonas Gelžinis	(United Kingdom) Michael Meadows	Redline Racing
2	R4	Donington Park (National), Leicestershire	15 April	(United Kingdom) Michael Meadows	(Lithuania) Jonas Gelžinis	(United Kingdom) Michael Meadows	Redline Racing
3	R5	Thruxton Circuit, Hampshire	29 April	(United Kingdom) Michael Meadows	(United Kingdom) Ben Barker	(United Kingdom) Michael Meadows	Redline Racing
3	R6	Thruxton Circuit, Hampshire	29 April	(United Kingdom) Michael Meadows	(United Kingdom) Sam Tordoff	(United Kingdom) Daniel Lloyd	Team Parker Racing
4	R7	Oulton Park (Island), Cheshire	10 June	(United Kingdom) Sam Tordoff	(United Kingdom) Michael Meadows	(United Kingdom) Sam Tordoff	Team Parker Racing
4	R8	Oulton Park (Island), Cheshire	10 June	(United Kingdom) Michael Meadows	(Lithuania) Jonas Gelžinis	(United Kingdom) Michael Meadows	Redline Racing
5	R9	Croft Circuit, North Yorkshire	23 June	(United Kingdom) Rory Butcher	(United Kingdom) Rory Butcher	(United Kingdom) Rory Butcher	Celtic Speed
5	R10	Croft Circuit, North Yorkshire	24 June	(United Kingdom) Rory Butcher	(United Kingdom) Rory Butcher	(United Kingdom) Rory Butcher	Celtic Speed
6	R11	Snetterton (300) Circuit, Norfolk	12 August	(United Kingdom) Sam Tordoff	(United Kingdom) Sam Tordoff	(United Kingdom) Sam Tordoff	Team Parker Racing
6	R12	Snetterton (300) Circuit, Norfolk	12 August	(United Kingdom) Sam Tordoff	(United Kingdom) Ben Barker	(United Kingdom) Sam Tordoff	Team Parker Racing
7	R13	Knockhill Racing Circuit, Fife	26 August	(United Kingdom) Ben Barker	(United Kingdom) Ben Barker	(United Kingdom) Ben Barker	Parr Motorsport
7	R14	Knockhill Racing Circuit, Fife	26 August	(United Kingdom) Ben Barker	(United Kingdom) Ben Barker	(United Kingdom) Ben Barker	Parr Motorsport
8	R15	Rockingham Motor Speedway, Northamptonshire	23 September	(United Kingdom) Ben Barker	(United Kingdom) Ben Barker	(United Kingdom) Ben Barker	Parr Motorsport
8	R16	Rockingham Motor Speedway, Northamptonshire	23 September	(United Kingdom) Ben Barker	(United Kingdom) Sam Tordoff	(United Kingdom) Ben Barker	Parr Motorsport
9	R17	Silverstone (National), Northamptonshire	7 October	(United Kingdom) Ben Barker	(Lithuania) Jonas Gelžinis	(United Kingdom) Ben Barker	Parr Motorsport
9	R18	Silverstone (National), Northamptonshire	7 October	(United Kingdom) Michael Meadows	(United Kingdom) Rory Butcher	(United Kingdom) Michael Meadows	Redline Racing
10	R19	Brands Hatch (GP), Kent	21 October	(Lithuania) Jonas Gelžinis	(Lithuania) Jonas Gelžinis	(Lithuania) Jonas Gelžinis	Juta Racing
10	R20	Brands Hatch (GP), Kent	21 October	(Lithuania) Jonas Gelžinis	(United Kingdom) Daniel Lloyd	(United Kingdom) Sam Tordoff	Team Parker Racing

== Championship standings ==
A driver's best 19 scores counted towards the championship, with any other points being discarded.

Pos	Driver	BHI		DON		THR		OUL		CRO		SNE		KNO		ROC		SIL		BHGP		Pen.	Pts
1	(United Kingdom) Michael Meadows	3	1	1	1	1	4	2	1	Ret	2	2	2	2	6	3	3	4	1	11	7		320
2	(United Kingdom) Ben Barker	5	5	2	Ret	2	5	6	7	5	7	Ret	3	1	1	1	1	1	4	5	2		282
3	(United Kingdom) Sam Tordoff	4	4	4	4	10	12	1	3	3	5	1	1	3	Ret	7	4	7	5	2	1		274
4	(Lithuania) Jonas Gelžinis	2	3	3	2	8	6	3	2	2	3	DSQ	5	4	11	2	8	8	3	1	10	4	259
5	(United Kingdom) Rory Butcher	7	13	6	6	3	3	5	4	1	1	5	11	Ret	2	5	2	3	7	3	3	3	254
6	(United Kingdom) Daniel Lloyd	Ret	2	8	3	5	1	4	5	6	4	4	12	5	3	9	Ret	Ret	9	4	5	9	202
7	(United Kingdom) Richard Plant	1	7	15	5	4	8	7	6	11	11	7	6	Ret	5	6	6	6	2	7	4		196
8	(Oman) Ahmad Al Harthy	10	11	5	7	6	7	10	9	7	8	Ret	8	6	4	Ret	7	9	8	10	Ret		143
9	(United Kingdom) Oliver Mortimer	11	9	12	Ret	11	10	11	8	10	10	9	10	7	8	11	10	12	10	13	11	3	108
10	(United Kingdom) Glynn Geddie	6	8	9	8	9	2	16	Ret	4	6	6	7	10	Ret							2	105
11	(United Kingdom) Derek Pierce	8	Ret	7	9	13	14	9	10	8	9	13	13	Ret	7	10	Ret	10	11	8	9		104
12	(Spain) Víctor Jiménez	DSQ	12	10	10	12	11	8	11	9	16	8	9	8	Ret	12	9	11	Ret	12	8	4	92
13	(United Kingdom) Andy Meyrick											3	4	DSQ	Ret	4	Ret	5	6	6	Ret	4	72
14	(United Kingdom) James Sutton															8	5	2	Ret	9	6		55
15	(United Kingdom) Keith Webster	14	14	13	Ret	14	15					10	14	11	9			Ret	Ret	14	12		36
16	(Turkey) Yücel Özbek	15	18	Ret	Ret	16	16	13	14	12	12	11	16	12	10	Ret	11						34
17	(United Kingdom) George Brewster	12	10			15	13			15	13			9	Ret			13	13	16	14		33
18	(United Kingdom) Chris Dymond	13	6			7	9																29
19	(United Kingdom) Will Goff	16	16					15	13	13	14	14	17			13	12	15	12	15	13		27
20	(Republic of Ireland) Karl Leonard			11	11			12	12														18
21	(Republic of Ireland) Michael Leonard	9	Ret	14	Ret			14	Ret			Ret	15									2	10
22	(Australia) Tania Mann	17	Ret	16	12	17	17					15	19	Ret	NC								5
23	(United Kingdom) Fraser O'Brien											12	18										4
24	(Lithuania) Tautvydas Barštys	Ret	15					17	Ret	14	15												4
25	(United Kingdom) Richard Denny																	14	Ret	17	15		3
26	(Belgium) Jean Glorieux	Ret	17																				0
Pos	Driver	BHI		DON		THR		OUL		CRO		SNE		KNO		ROC		SIL		BHGP		Pen.	Pts

Colour	Result
Gold	Winner
Silver	Second place
Bronze	Third place
Green	Points finish
Blue	Non-points finish
Blue	Non-classified finish (NC)
Purple	Retired (Ret)
Red	Did not qualify (DNQ)
Red	Did not pre-qualify (DNPQ)
Black	Disqualified (DSQ)
White	Did not start (DNS)
White	Withdrew (WD)
White	Race cancelled (C)
Blank	Did not practice (DNP)
Blank	Did not arrive (DNA)
Blank	Excluded (EX)
