= Ben Barker (racing driver) =

British racing driver (born 1991)

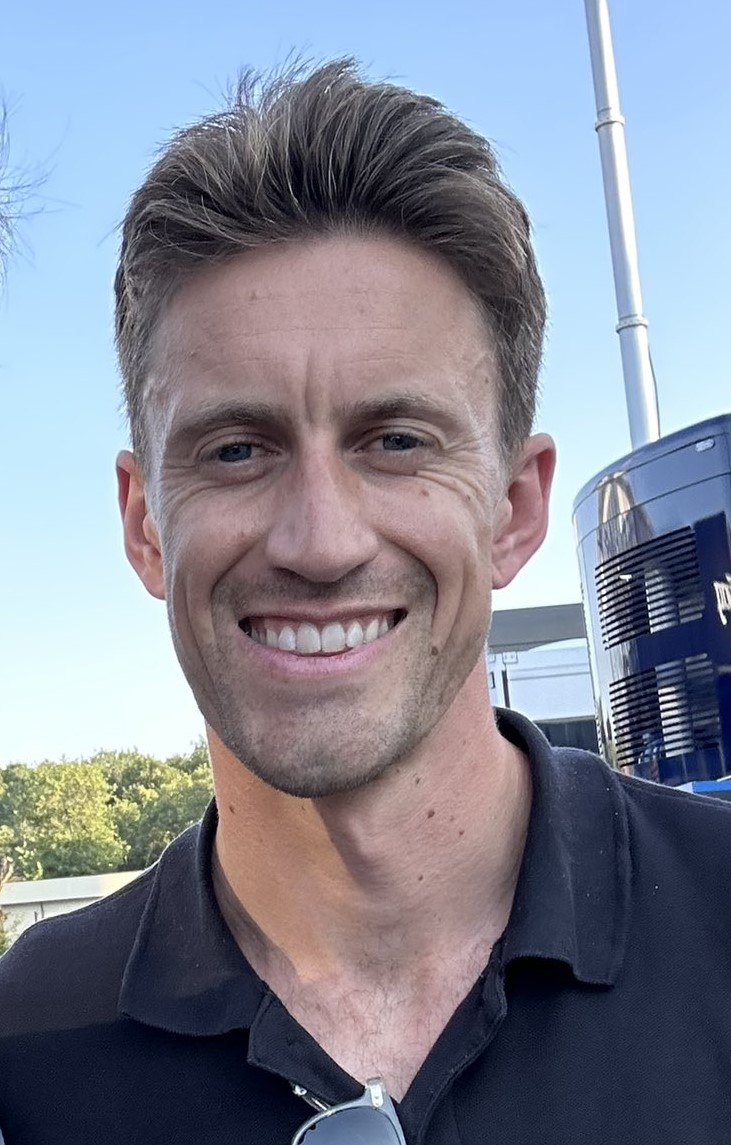
- Barker in 2023
- Nationality: (United Kingdom) British
- Born: Benjamin William Barker; 23 April 1991 (age 35) Cambridge, United Kingdom

FIA World Endurance Championship career
- Debut season: 2016
- Current team: Proton Competition
- Categorisation: FIA Silver (2014, 2016); FIA Gold (2015, 2017–)
- Car number: 77
- Co-driver: Bernardo Sousa, Ben Tuck
- Former teams: GR Racing
- Starts: 68 (68 entries)
- Wins: 0
- Podiums: 7
- Poles: 0
- Fastest laps: 3
- Best finish: 6th (LMGTE Am) in 2017, 2023 FIA World Endurance Championship

Championship titles
- 2010: Australian Drivers' Championship

Benjamin William Barker (born 23 April 1991) is a British professional racing driver currently competing in the FIA World Endurance Championship. A Porsche stalwart for over a decade, he is an Australian Formula 3 champion, a Porsche Carrera Cup GB runner-up, a four-time Bathurst 12 Hour class winner and a Dubai 24 Hour overall winner. Despite limited success in the FIA World Endurance Championship, Barker is considered one of the strongest GTE Am drivers, having broken the lap record for the category at the 2018 24 Hours of Le Mans.

In 2023, Barker finished on the 24 Hours of Le Mans class podium, having played an instrumental role in his team's charge towards the front. Ahead of the 2024 season, Barker left GR Racing after eight seasons to become a Ford factory driver, moving to Proton Competition.

== Early career ==
Having started his career in karts in 2004, Barker would step into the British Formula Ford Championship in 2009 with Fluid Motorsport Development. Following a year in which he scored one win at Knockhill, the Brit would migrate to Australia for a season in the 2010 Australian Formula 3 Championship. He won the title by one point versus Mitch Evans, having taken six race wins.

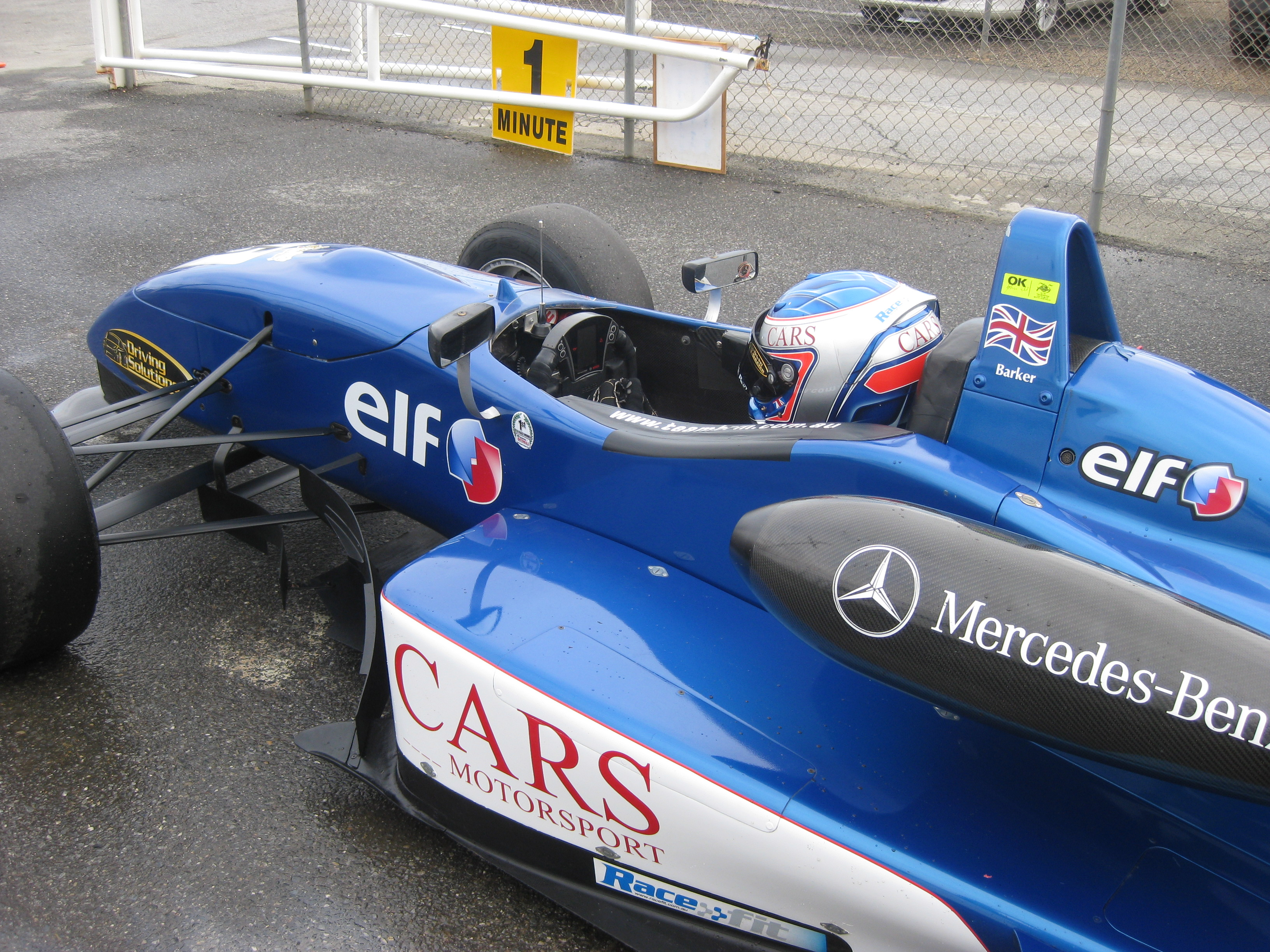
Barker in 2010, his Australian Formula 3 title-winning season

== Sportscar career ==
=== National Porsche Cups ===
Barker moved into the Australian Porsche Carrera Cup in 2011, remaining with Team BRM, where he would finish fifth in the standings. The following year saw him return to Britain, partaking in a full-time campaign in the Porsche Carrera Cup GB. Despite having to wait for his first victory until the round at Knockhill, Barker would finish second in the championship, having won five races in a row in the latter half of the season.

=== Porsche Supercup ===
In 2013, Barker graduated to the Porsche Supercup as part of Team Bleekemolen. With a best result of fourth at the final round, Barker finished tenth in the overall standings and third in the rookie classification. At the end of the year, Barker would receive a silver ranking by the FIA.

Remaining in the Supercup for 2014, Barker would score one podium for the Lechner Racing Team. He also took part in the support race of the 2014 24 Hours of Le Mans, where he won with a gap of five seconds to Tom Dillmann. As well as this, Barker paired up with businessman Michael Wainwright at his team Gulf Racing in the LMGTE class of the European Le Mans Series, driving a Porsche 911 RSR. Finally, Barker made six appearances for GB Autosport in the United SportsCar Championship.

At the start of 2015, Barker would be upgraded to gold by the FIA. He switched to MOMO-Megatron Team PARTRAX in the Porsche Supercup, where a podium at Monaco helped him to ninth in the standings. He also appeared in the Porsche Carrera Cup Germany, in which the Briton scored two podiums.

=== Tenure with GR Racing ===
Before the 2016 season, it was announced that Barker would partner Michael Wainwright and Adam Carroll at Gulf Racing in the FIA World Endurance Championship. Driving in the LMGTE Am category, the trio scored four fourth places and finished fifth in class at the 24 Hours of Le Mans, thereby ending up sixth in the teams' championship. Barker partook in a round of the ELMS with Proton Competition, scoring a pole position at Estoril.

Barker remained with Wainwright and Gulf Racing for the 2017 season, this time being partnered by Nick Foster. Their results improved, as Barker was able to guide the team to third place at Mexico and to second in Shanghai, though the team would once again finish the championship as the lowest full-time entrant with fifth place overall.

For the 2018–19 WEC "super-season", Barker and Wainwright were joined by Alex Davison for the first three rounds and by Thomas Preining during subsequent events. The season itself brought few peaks, with the team failing to score a podium, though their consistency of finishing every race would bring Gulf Racing sixth in the standings. Barker managed to stand out, setting a new lap record for his category at the 2018 24 Hours of Le Mans. During these two years Barker would also win the Bathurst 12 Hour race in the GT3 Cup class, having previously won this race in 2014 driving in the same category.

In the 2019–20 WEC campaign, Barker, Wainwright, and new teammate Andrew Watson managed to score a lone podium in Bahrain, finishing third. They ended up seventh in the standings, having once again completed every race. At the start of 2020, Barker would attain overall victory at the Dubai 24 Hours and took another Bathurst victory, this one coming in the GT3 Pro-Am class.

The 2021 season proved to be a disappointment, as the team dropped to twelfth and last of all full-time LMGTE Am entries with a best race result of sixth place.

Having started his 2022 season by leading Dinamic Motorsport in the Asian Le Mans Series, Barker returned to GR Racing with Wainwright and new silver-ranked driver Riccardo Pera. Even though they missed the opening round, the team improved by scoring a then-record fourth place at the 24 Hours of Le Mans and rising to eighth in the teams' standings. Barker would play his part, setting two overall fastest laps in class at Spa and Monza.

The team retained their lineup for the 2023 WEC season, the last of the LMGTE era. The year proved to be the team's magnum opus, as Barker helped GR to finish third at the Centenary Le Mans 24 Hours, where Barker proved to be the fastest LMGTE driver, before managing another third place in Monza. These two podiums helped the team to sixth in the championship. Barker concluded his tenure with GR Racing by racing in the 2023–24 Asian Le Mans Series, stating that Wainwright and the team had "put [him] on a pedestal" by giving him the chance to race in the WEC for seven seasons.

=== Ford factory driver ===
At the end of 2023, it was announced that Barker would become part of the Ford factory driver lineup in the WEC and join the Canada-based Multimatic Motorsports operation. He would migrate to Proton Competition, driving a Ford Mustang GT3 alongside Zacharie Robichon and Ryan Hardwick in 2024.

== Racing record ==
=== Racing career summary ===
Season	Series	Team	Races	Wins	Poles	F/Laps	Podiums	Points	Position
2009	British Formula Ford Championship	Fluid Motorsport Development	24	1	1	1	1	272	8th
2009	Formula Ford Festival	Fluid Motorsport Development	3	0	0	0	1	N/A	4th
2010	Australian Formula 3 Championship - Gold Star	Team BRM	20	6	1	10	12	220	**1st**
2010	Australian Formula 3 Championship - East Coast Shootout	Team BRM	8	3	0	5	6	101	**1st**
2010	Australian Formula Ford Championship	Team BRM	2	0	0	0	0	0	NC†
2010	Fujitsu V8 Supercar Series	MW Motorsport	2	0	0	0	0	156	31st
2011	Porsche Carrera Cup Australia	Team BRM	21	2	2	3	6	755	5th
2011	Porsche Carrera Cup Great Britain	Parr Motorsport	4	0	0	1	2	45	17th
2011	Radical Australia Cup	Excaliber Racing	2	1	0	1	2	0	NC†
2011	PSCRAA Enduro Championship	Quintessence Construction	2	0	0	0	0	0	NC†
2012	Porsche Carrera Cup Great Britain	Parr Motorsport	20	5	5	5	9	282	**2nd**
2012	Historic Grand Prix of Monaco - F3 pre-1985		1	1	1	1	1	N/A	**1st**
2013	Porsche Supercup	Team Bleekemolen	9	0	0	0	0	66	10th
2013	Porsche Carrera Cup Asia	Team BetterLife	2	0	0	0	1	0	NC†
2014	Porsche Supercup	VERVA Lechner Racing Team	10	0	0	0	1	96	6th
2014	European Le Mans Series - GTC	Gulf Racing UK	4	0	0	0	0	26	12th
2014	United Sports Car Championship - GTD	GB Autosport	6	0	0	0	0	139	26th
2014	Porsche Carrera Cup Great Britain	Parr Motorsport	3	3	1	2	3	22	19th
2014	Porsche Carrera Cup 24H Le Mans Support Race - Class A	Parr Motorsport	1	1	0	0	1	N/A	**1st**
2014	Bathurst 12 Hour - Class B	Grove Motorsport	1	1	0	0	1	N/A	**1st**
2015	Porsche Supercup	MOMO-Megatron Team PARTRAX	9	0	0	0	1	69	9th
2015	Porsche Carrera Cup Germany - Class A	Land Motorsport	17	0	0	0	2	101	12th
2015	Bathurst 12 Hour - Class B	Grove Group	1	0	0	0	1	N/A	**2nd**
2016	FIA World Endurance Championship - LMGTE Am	Gulf Racing	9	0	0	0	0	106	7th
2016	24 Hours of Le Mans - LMGTE Am	Gulf Racing	1	0	0	0	0	N/A	5th
2016	Porsche Supercup	MOMO-Megatron Team PARTRAX	4	0	0	0	0	43	12th
2016	European Le Mans Series - GTE	Proton Competition	1	0	1	0	0	11	18th
2016	GT3 Le Mans Cup	Mentos Racing	1	0	0	0	1	18	11th
2016	IMSA SportsCar Championship - GTD	TRG-AMR	1	0	0	0	0	26	45th
2017	FIA World Endurance Championship - LMGTE Am	Gulf Racing	9	0	0	0	2	97	6th
2017	24 Hours of Le Mans - LMGTE Am	Gulf Racing	1	0	0	0	0	N/A	10th
2017	Le Mans Cup - GT3	Gulf Racing	4	1	1	3	2	44.5	6th
2017	Bathurst 12 Hour - Class B (GT3 Cup)	Grove Motorsport	1	0	1	1	0	0	NC†
2018	European Le Mans Series - GTE	Gulf Racing	2	0	0	0	0	10	12th
2018	24 Hours of Le Mans - LMGTE Am	Gulf Racing	1	0	0	1	0	N/A	10th
2018	Bathurst 12 Hour - Class B (GT3 Cup)	Grove Racing	1	1	1	0	1	N/A	**1st**
2018–19	FIA World Endurance Championship - LMGTE Am	Gulf Racing UK	8	0	0	1	0	79	7th
2019	Bathurst 12 Hour - Class B (GT3 Cup)	Grove Racing	1	1	1	0	1	N/A	**1st**
2019	24 Hours of Le Mans - LMGTE Am	Gulf Racing	1	0	0	0	0	N/A	8th
2019–20	FIA World Endurance Championship - LMGTE Am	Gulf Racing	8	0	0	0	1	85	9th
2020	European Le Mans Series - GTE	Gulf Racing UK	1	0	0	0	0	0	NC†
2020	24 Hours of Le Mans - LMGTE Am	Gulf Racing UK	1	0	0	0	0	N/A	5th
2020	24H GT Series Continents' - GT3 Pro	Black Falcon	1	1	0	0	1	30	**3rd**
2020	Dubai 24 Hour - GT3 Pro	Black Falcon	1	1	0	0	1	N/A	**1st**
2020	Bathurst 12 Hour - Class A (GT3 Pro/Am)	Grove Racing	1	1	0	0	1	N/A	**1st**
2021	FIA World Endurance Championship - LMGTE Am	GR Racing	6	0	0	0	0	23	15th
2021	24 Hours of Le Mans - LMGTE Am	GR Racing	1	0	0	0	0	N/A	14th
2021	International GT Open - Pro Cup	Lechner Racing	2	0	1	0	2	18	13th
2021	British GT Cup Championship - GTH	In2 Racing	4	2	0	0	3	0	NC†
2022	Asian Le Mans Series - GT	Dinamic Motorsport	4	0	0	0	0	5.5	13th
2022	FIA World Endurance Championship - LMGTE Am	GR Racing	5	0	0	2	0	50	10th
2022	24 Hours of Le Mans - LMGTE Am	GR Racing	1	0	0	0	0	N/A	4th
2022	GT World Challenge Europe Sprint Cup	Barwell Motorsport	0	0	0	0	0	0	NC
2022	GT World Challenge Europe Sprint Cup - Pro-Am	Barwell Motorsport	0	0	1	0	0	1	7th
2022	GT World Challenge Europe Endurance Cup	Barwell Motorsport	1	0	0	0	0	0	NC
2022	GT World Challenge Europe Endurance Cup	Allied Racing	1	0	0	0	0	0	NC
2022	GT World Challenge Europe Endurance Cup - Gold	Barwell Motorsport	1	0	0	0	0	18	15th
2022	GT World Challenge Europe Endurance Cup - Gold	Allied Racing	1	0	0	1	0	18	15th
2022	Bathurst 12 Hour - Class A (GT3 Pro/Am)	Grove Racing	1	0	0	0	0	N/A	DNF
2023	Asian Le Mans Series - GT	Dinamic GT	0	0	0	0	0	0	23rd
2023	Asian Le Mans Series - GT	Kessel Racing	1	0	0	0	0	0	23rd
2023	FIA World Endurance Championship - LMGTE Am	GR Racing	7	0	0	0	2	64	6th
2023	24 Hours of Le Mans - LMGTE Am	GR Racing	1	0	0	0	1	N/A	**3rd**
2023	GT World Challenge Europe Endurance Cup	Dinamic GT Huber Racing	3	0	0	0	0	0	NC
2023	GT World Challenge Europe Endurance Cup	Dinamic GT	2	0	0	0	0	0	NC
2023	Aurum 1006 km - GT Open	LG OLED LKU by Porsche Club Lithuania	1	0	0	0	0	N/A	7th
2023–24	Asian Le Mans Series - GT	GR Racing	4	0	0	0	0	6	25th
2024	FIA World Endurance Championship - LMGT3	Proton Competition	8	0	0	0	0	18	22nd
2024	IMSA SportsCar Championship - GTD	Proton Competition	1	0	0	0	0	172	69th
2024	GT World Challenge Europe Endurance Cup	Proton Competition	1	0	0	0	0	0	NC
2024	Nürburgring Langstrecken-Serie - VT2-FWD	Walkenhorst Motorsport	1	0	0	0	1	0	NC†
2024	Nürburgring Langstrecken-Serie - VT2-R+4WD	Walkenhorst Motorsport	1	0	0	0	0	0	NC†
2024	Aurum 1006 km - GT Open	LG OLED & RIMO Adero	1	1	1	1	1	N/A	**1st**
2025	FIA World Endurance Championship - LMGT3	Proton Competition	8	0	0	0	0	39	14th
2025	IMSA SportsCar Championship - GTD Pro	Ford Multimatic Motorsports	2	0	0	0	0	586	22nd
2025	Aurum 1006 km - GT Open	RIMO & LKU by EQUPAY.CH	1	1	1	1	1	N/A	**1st**
2026	IMSA SportsCar Championship - GTD Pro	Ford Racing	10	1	0	1	3	2821	6th
2026	Aurum 1006 km - GT Open	RIMO Adero & LKU.LT	1	1	1	1	1	N/A	**1st**

^{†} As Barker was a guest driver, he was ineligible to score points.
^{*} Season still in progress.

=== Complete Porsche Supercup results ===
(key) (Races in bold indicate pole position) (Races in italics indicate fastest lap)

Year	Team	1	2	3	4	5	6	7	8	9	10	11	Pos.	Points
2013	Team Bleekemolen	CAT; 10	MON; 9	SIL; 9	GER; 6	HUN; 16	SPA; 9	MNZ; 12	UAE; 4	UAE; 9			10th	66
2014	Verva Lechner Racing Team	CAT; 3	MON; 5	RBR; 8	SIL; 9	GER; 10	HUN; 8	SPA; 7	MNZ; 9	USA; 7	USA; 4		6th	96
2015	MOMO Megatron Team PARTRAX	CAT; 9	MON; 3	RBR; 19	SIL; 4	HUN; 12	SPA; 6	SPA; 8	MNZ; Ret	MNZ; DNS	USA; C	USA; 6	9th	69
2016	MOMO-Megatron Team Partrax	CAT; 4	MON; 4	RBR; 15	SIL; 14	HUN	HOC	SPA	MNZ	COA	COA		12th	43

=== Complete European Le Mans Series results ===
(key) (Races in bold indicate pole position) (Races in italics indicate fastest lap)

Year	Entrant	Class	Chassis	Engine	1	2	3	4	5	6	Rank	Points
2014	Gulf Racing UK	GTE	Porsche 997 GT3-RSR	Porsche 4.0 L Flat-6	SIL; 9	IMO; 8	RBR				12th	26
2014	Gulf Racing UK	GTE	Porsche 911 RSR	Porsche 4.0 L Flat-6				LEC; 6	EST; 4		12th	26
2016	Proton Competition	LMGTE	Porsche 911 RSR	Porsche 4.0 L Flat-6	SIL	IMO	RBR	LEC	SPA	**EST**; 5	18th	11
2018	Gulf Racing	LMGTE	Porsche 911 RSR	Porsche 4.0 L Flat-6	LEC; Ret	MNZ	RBR	SIL; 5	SPA	ALG	7th	10
2020	Gulf Racing UK	LMGTE	Porsche 911 RSR	Porsche 4.0 L Flat-6	LEC	SPA	LEC	MNZ	ALG; Ret		NC	0

=== Complete IMSA SportsCar Championship results ===
(key) (Races in bold indicate pole position; races in italics indicate fastest lap)

Year	Entrant	Class	Make	Engine	1	2	3	4	5	6	7	8	9	10	11	Rank	Points
2014	GB Autosport	GTD	Porsche 911 GT America	Porsche 4.0 L Flat-6	DAY	SEB	LGA	DET; 9	WGL; 9	MOS; 4	IND	ELK; 12†	VIR	COA; 9	PET; 11	26th	139
2016	TRG-AMR	GTD	Aston Martin V12 Vantage GT3	Aston Martin 6.0 L V12	DAY	SEB	LGA	DET	WGL	MOS	LIM	ELK	VIR	COA; 6	PET	45th	26
2024	Proton Competition	GTD	Ford Mustang GT3	Ford Coyote 5.4 L V8	DAY	SEB	LBH	LGA	WGL	MOS	ELK	VIR	IMS; 17	PET		69th	172
2025	Ford Multimatic Motorsports	GTD Pro	Ford Mustang GT3	Ford Coyote 5.4 L V8	DAY	SEB; 5	LGA	DET	WGL	MOS	ELK	VIR	IMS	PET; 4		22nd	586
2026	Ford Racing	GTD Pro	Ford Mustang GT3 Evo	Ford Coyote 5.4 L V8	DAY; 14	SEB; 6	LGA; 6	DET; 5	WGL; 3	MOS; 7	ELK; 5	VIR; 2	IMS; 1	PET; 9		6th	2821

=== Complete FIA World Endurance Championship results ===
(key) (Races in bold indicate pole position) (Races in italics indicate fastest lap)

Year	Entrant	Class	Car	Engine	1	2	3	4	5	6	7	8	9	Rank	Points
2016	Gulf Racing	LMGTE Am	Porsche 911 RSR	Porsche 4.0 L Flat-6	SIL; Ret	SPA; 5	LMS; 3	NÜR; 5	MEX; 4	COA; 4	FUJ; 4	SHA; 6	BHR; 4	7th	106
2017	Gulf Racing	LMGTE Am	Porsche 911 RSR	Porsche 4.0 L Flat-6	SIL; 4	SPA; Ret	LMS; 5	NÜR; 5	MEX; 3	COA; Ret	FUJ; 4	SHA; 2	BHR; 5	6th	97
2018–19	Gulf Racing UK	LMGTE Am	Porsche 911 RSR	Porsche 4.0 L Flat-6	SPA; 7	LMS; 6	SIL; 6	FUJ; 4	SHA; 9	SEB; 4	SPA; 7	LMS; 4		7th	79
2019–20	Gulf Racing	LMGTE Am	Porsche 911 RSR	Porsche 4.0 L Flat-6	SIL; 4	FUJ; 8	SHA; 9	BHR; 3	COA; 6	SPA; 10	LMS; 5	BHR; 5		9th	85
2021	GR Racing	LMGTE Am	Porsche 911 RSR-19	Porsche 4.2 L Flat-6	SPA; Ret	ALG; 8	MNZ; 8	LMS; 9	BHR; 6	BHR; 9				15th	23
2022	GR Racing	LMGTE Am	Porsche 911 RSR-19	Porsche 4.2 L Flat-6	SEB	SPA; 6	LMS; 3	MNZ; 12	FUJ; 12	BHR; 6				10th	50
2023	GR Racing	LMGTE Am	Porsche 911 RSR-19	Porsche 4.2 L Flat-6	SEB; 7	PRT; 11	SPA; 12	LMS; 3	MNZ; 3	FUJ; 8	BHR; 8			6th	64
2024	Proton Competition	LMGT3	Ford Mustang GT3	Ford Coyote 5.4 L V8	QAT; 11	IMO; 9	SPA; 9	LMS; 14	SÃO; 7	COA; 6	FUJ; 15	BHR; Ret		22nd	18
2025	Proton Competition	LMGT3	Ford Mustang GT3	Ford Coyote 5.4 L V8	QAT; Ret	IMO; 10	SPA; 4	LMS; 7	SÃO; Ret	COA; 6	FUJ; 12	BHR; 8		14th	39

^{*} Season still in progress.

=== Complete 24 Hours of Le Mans results ===
Year	Team	Co-Drivers	Car	Class	Laps	Pos.	Class Pos.
2016	(United Kingdom) Gulf Racing	(United Kingdom) Adam Carroll (United Kingdom) Michael Wainwright	Porsche 911 RSR	GTE; Am	328	33rd	5th
2017	(United Kingdom) Gulf Racing UK	(Australia) Nick Foster (United Kingdom) Michael Wainwright	Porsche 911 RSR	GTE; Am	328	38th	10th
2018	(United Kingdom) Gulf Racing	(Australia) Alex Davison (United Kingdom) Michael Wainwright	Porsche 911 RSR	GTE; Am	283	40th	10th
2019	(United Kingdom) Gulf Racing	(Austria) Thomas Preining (United Kingdom) Michael Wainwright	Porsche 911 RSR	GTE; Am	331	38th	8th
2020	(United Kingdom) Gulf Racing	(United Kingdom) Michael Wainwright (United Kingdom) Andrew Watson	Porsche 911 RSR	GTE; Am	337	29th	5th
2021	(United Kingdom) GR Racing	(United Kingdom) Tom Gamble (United Kingdom) Michael Wainwright	Porsche 911 RSR-19	GTE; Am	322	43rd	14th
2022	(United Kingdom) GR Racing	(Italy) Riccardo Pera (United Kingdom) Michael Wainwright	Porsche 911 RSR-19	GTE; Am	340	37th	4th
2023	(United Kingdom) GR Racing	(Italy) Riccardo Pera (United Kingdom) Michael Wainwright	Porsche 911 RSR-19	GTE; Am	312	29th	**3rd**
2024	(Germany) Proton Competition	(United States) Ryan Hardwick (Canada) Zacharie Robichon	Ford Mustang GT3	LMGT3	227	46th	17th
2025	(Germany) Proton Competition	(Portugal) Bernardo Sousa (United Kingdom) Ben Tuck	Ford Mustang GT3	LMGT3	338	41st	9th

=== Complete Asian Le Mans Series results ===
(key) (Races in bold indicate pole position) (Races in italics indicate fastest lap)

Year	Team	Class	Car	Engine	1	2	3	4	5	Pos.	Points
2022	Dinamic Motorsport	GT	Porsche 911 GT3 R	Porsche 4.0 L Flat-6	DUB; 1; 14	DUB; 2; 13	ABU; 1; 12	ABU; 2; 8		13th	5.5
2023	Dinamic GT	GT	Porsche 911 GT3 R	Porsche 4.0 L Flat-6	DUB; 1 DNS					23rd	0
2023	Kessel Racing	GT	Ferrari 488 GT3 Evo 2020	Ferrari F154CB 3.9 L Turbo V8		DUB; 2; 13	ABU; 1 DNS	ABU; 2 WD		23rd	0
2023–24	GR Racing	GT	Ferrari 296 GT3	Ferrari F163CE 3.0 L Turbo V6	SEP; 1; 9	SEP; 2; 11	DUB; 1; 8	ABU; 1 Ret	ABU; 2 WD	25th	6

=== Complete GT World Challenge Europe results ===
==== GT World Challenge Europe Endurance Cup ====
(key) (Races in bold indicate pole position) (Races in italics indicate fastest lap)

Year	Team	Car	Class	1	2	3	4	5	6	7	Pos.	Points
2022	Barwell Motorsport	Lamborghini Huracán GT3 Evo	Gold	IMO; 25							20th	18
2022	Allied Racing	Porsche 911 GT3 R	Gold		LEC; 30	SPA; 6H	SPA; 12H	SPA; 24H	HOC	CAT	20th	18
2023	Dinamic GT Huber Racing	Porsche 911 GT3 R (992)	Bronze	MNZ; 43†	LEC; 28	SPA; 6H; 44	SPA; 12H; 38	SPA; 24H; 48†			20th	15
2023	Dinamic GT	Porsche 911 GT3 R (992)	Bronze						NÜR; 34	CAT; 26	20th	15
2024	Proton Competition	Ford Mustang GT3	Pro	LEC	SPA; 6H	SPA; 12H	SPA; 24H	NÜR	MNZ	JED; Ret	NC	0

==== GT World Challenge Europe Sprint Cup ====
(key) (Races in bold indicate pole position) (Races in italics indicate fastest lap)

Year	Team	Car	Class	1	2	3	4	5	6	7	8	9	10	Pos.	Points
2022	Barwell Motorsport	Lamborghini Huracán GT3 Evo	Pro-Am	BRH; 1 DNS	**BRH**; **2** DNS	MAG; 1	MAG; 2	ZAN; 1	ZAN; 2	MIS; 1	MIS; 2	VAL; 1	VAL; 2	7th	1

Sporting positions
Preceded by Joey Foster	Winner of the Australian Drivers' Championship; 2010	Succeeded by Chris Gilmour
