= Ignas Gelžinis =

Lithuanian racing driver (born 1991)

- Gelžinis in 2013
- Nationality: (Lithuania) Lithuanian
- Born: 28 February 1991 (age 35) Kaunas, Lithuania
- Relatives: Jonas Gelžinis (brother)

Porsche Carrera Cup Great Britain career
- Debut season: 2015
- Current team: Juta Racing
- Categorisation: FIA Silver
- Car number: 8
- Starts: 8
- Wins: 0
- Poles: 0
- Fastest laps: 0

Previous series
- Renault Clio Cup United Kingdom, Porsche GT3 Cup Challenge Central Europe

Championship titles
- 2015 2015: 1000 kilometrų lenktynės Porsche Carrera Cup Great Britain Pro-AM1

Ignas Gelžinis (born 28 February 1991) is a Lithuanian racing driver, currently racing in Porsche Carrera Cup Great Britain championship. His older brother Jonas Gelžinis is also racing driver.

== Career Summary ==
=== 2012–2014: Renault Clio Cup United Kingdom ===
From 2012 to 2013, Gelžinis competed in Renault Clio Cup United Kingdom. In his rookie year, he took tenth place in final standings with 152 points.

2013 season was less successful: Gelžinis took 15th place in final standings with 106 points.

=== 2014: Porsche GT3 Cup Challenge Central Europe ===
In 2014, Gelžinis moved to Porsche GT3 Cup Challenge Central Europe. After difficult start of the season in Hungaroring, he scored his first podium finish in second round of the season in Poznan Circuit, finishing both races in the top-three. The following round in Salzburgring was even more successful. He took his first victory with Porsche in the second race of the weekend. In the following round at Autodrom Most, Gelžinis finished on podium twice and moved into third place in the standings. More podium finishes came in fifth round at Slovakiaring and victory in Poznan Circuit allowed Gelžinis to move to second place in the standings. Two second-place finishes in final round of the season was not enough to win the championship and Gelžinis ended the season in second place with 218 points, 18 points less than winner Stefan Bilinski.

=== 2015–present: Porsche Carrera Cup Great Britain ===
In 2015, Gelžinis returned to United Kingdom to compete in Porsche Carrera Cup Great Britain. After four championship rounds, he was leading Pro-AM1 class standings. He lost the lead to Jordan Witt after rounds in Snetterton and Knockhill, but after few more wins in his class at Silverstone and Brands Hatch, Gelžinis returned to top position and with 154 points became a Pro-AM1 champion in his rookie years.
