= Porsche Carrera Cup Great Britain =

One-make motor racing series in the UK

- Category: One-make racing by Porsche
- Country: United Kingdom
- Inaugural season: 2003
- Drivers: 20-30
- Teams: 8-10
- Constructors: Porsche
- Tyre suppliers: Michelin
- Drivers' champion: (United Kingdom) Dan Cammish
- Teams' champion: (United Kingdom) Redline Racing
- Official website: Porsche Carrera Cup GB

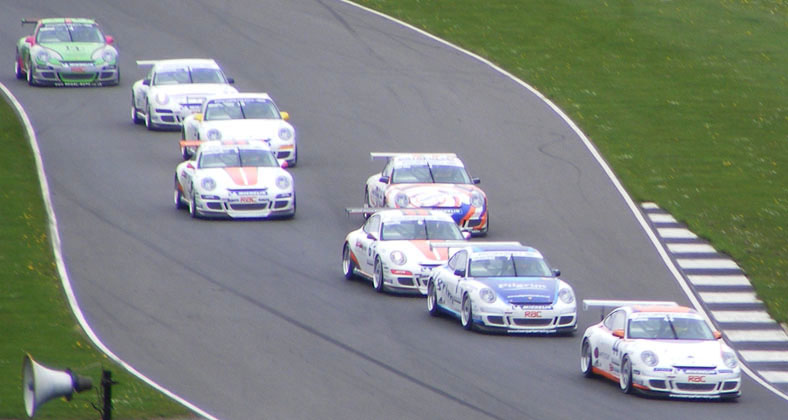
Porsche Carrera Cup GB Race at Donington Park, 2008

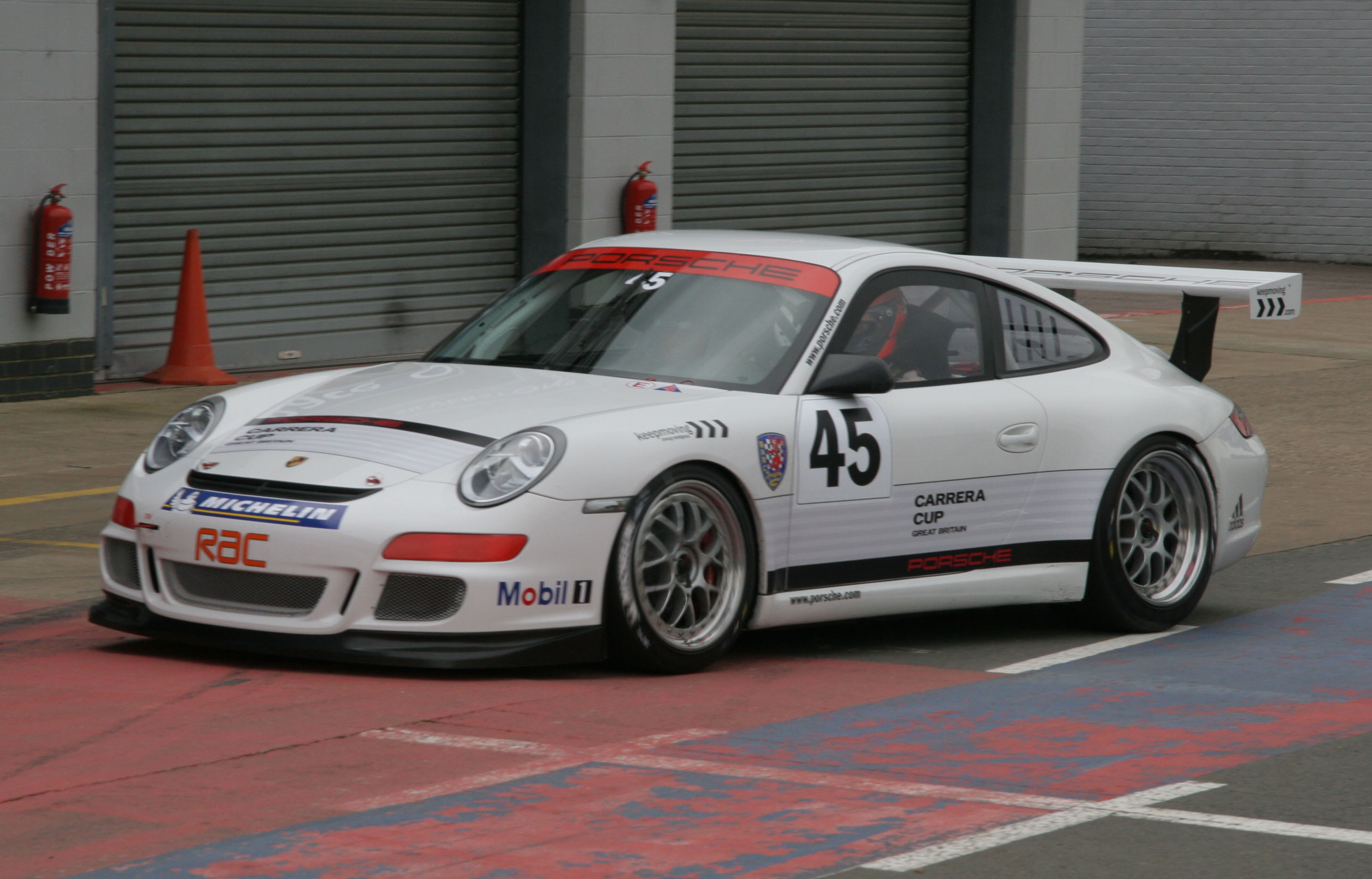
Carrera Cup Car

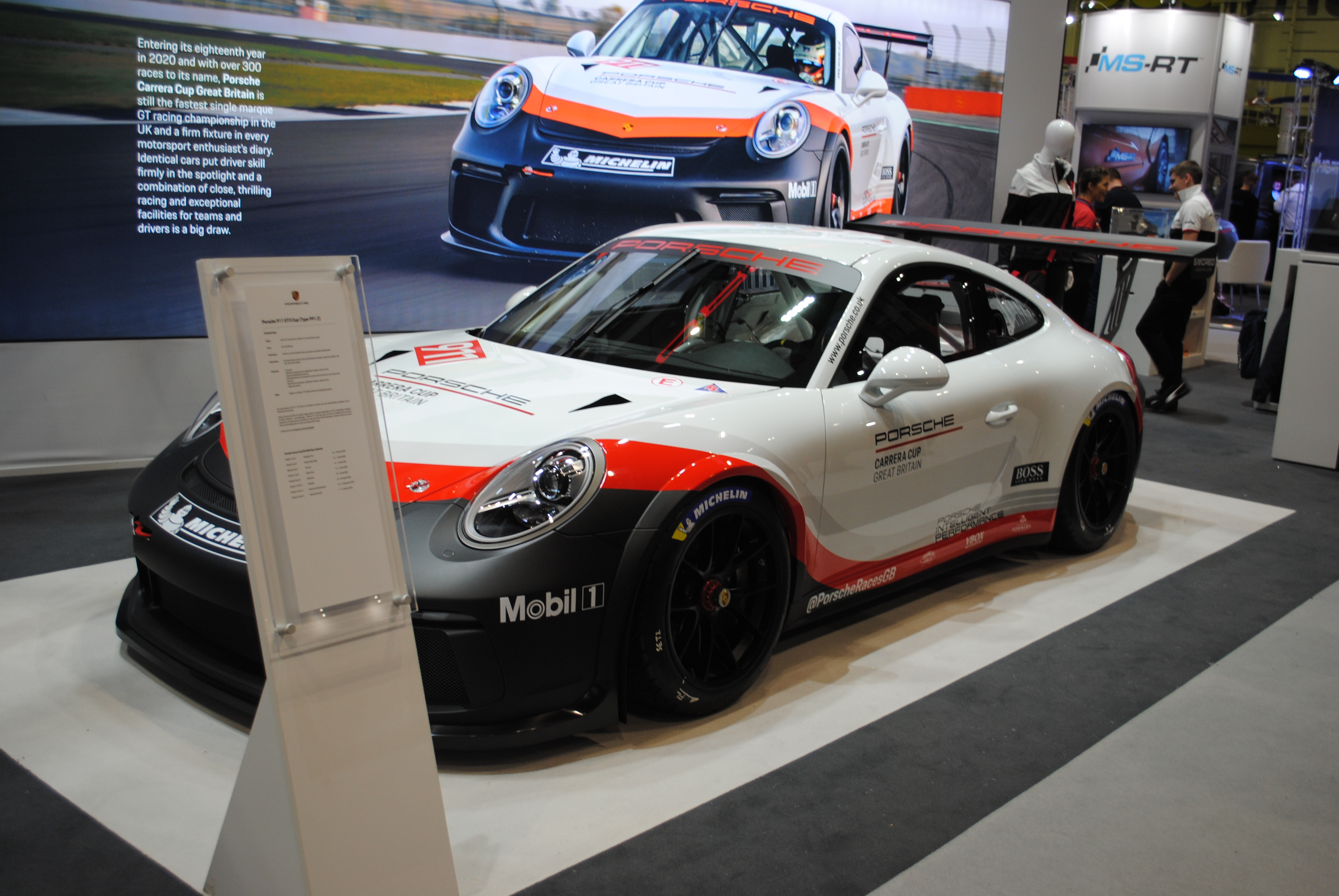
The car currently used in the championship, the Porsche 991 GT3 Cup.

The Porsche Carrera Cup Great Britain is a multi-event one-make motor racing series that takes place in the United Kingdom for the Porsche 911 GT3 since 2003. It is the fastest and most successful single marque GT championship in the UK, with over 30,000 visitors attending the majority of the races and approximately 370,000 visitors over the duration of the season. Notable drivers in the championship have been two-time Porsche Mobil 1 Supercup winner Richard Westbrook and Supercup race winner Damien Faulkner.

The series is currently shown live on ITV4 as part of the channel's coverage of BTCC race days.

== History ==
The Porsche Carrera Cup Great Britain had its inaugural Season in 2003, and is since then held across England, Scotland and Ireland. The Championship features a mix of professional motor racing teams and privately funded drivers. The Drivers compete in identical 911 Carrera GT3 Cup Cars, that conform technical regulations for the championship and aim to put driver skills in the spotlight. Although the championship is primarily held across the UK, single races in Germany, France and Belgium had been included to the regular racing calendar in seasons 2011, 2014 and 2015. Notable drivers are 2015 Le Mans winner Nick Tandy, two-time Porsche Mobil 1 winner Richard Westbrook and Supercup race winner Damien Faulkner.

The Championship continues to be a prime support race to British Touring Car Championship and is featured on a 7-hour live coverage on ITV4 each race weekend. Teams, Drivers and sponsors benefit from the Porsche Carrera Cup GB being broadcast on live TV.

In 2006 Porsche introduced a Pro- categories, Rookies are able to win even more money from their respective class.

Since introduced for the 2018 season. All drivers are competing in a flat-six, rear-engine 911 (Type 991.2) GT3 Cup Car, with 485bhp (361kW). .

== Scoring system ==
| | 1st | 2nd | 3rd | 4th | 5th | 6th | 7th | 8th | PP | FL |
| Race 1 (Pro) | 12 | 10 | 8 | 6 | 4 | 3 | 2 | 1 | 2 | 1 |
| Race 2 (All Classes) | 10 | 8 | 6 | 5 | 4 | 3 | 2 | 1 | 0 | 1 |

The current scoring system

== Champions ==
| Season | Champion | Team Champion | | | | |
|---|---|---|---|---|---|---|
| 2003 | (United Kingdom) Barry Horne | (United Kingdom) Team Parker Racing | | | | |
| 2004 | (United Kingdom) Richard Westbrook | (United Kingdom) Redline Racing | | | | |
| 2005 | (Republic of Ireland) Damien Faulkner | (United Kingdom) Team Parker Racing | | | | |
| Season | Champion | Team Champion | Pro-Am Champion | Pro-Am Team | | |
| 2006 | (Republic of Ireland) Damien Faulkner (2) | (United Kingdom) Team Parker Racing | (United Kingdom) Phil Quaife | (United Kingdom) Motorbase Performance | | |
| 2007 | (United Kingdom) James Sutton | (United Kingdom) Redline Racing | (United Kingdom) Nigel Rice | (United Kingdom) Redline Racing | | |
| Season | Champion | Team Champion | Pro-Am 1 Champion | Pro-Am 1 Team | Pro-Am 2 Champion | Pro-Am 2 Team |
| 2008 | (United Kingdom) Tim Harvey | (United Kingdom) Redline Racing | (United Kingdom) Nigel Rice | (United Kingdom) Redline Racing | (United Kingdom) Glynn Geddie | (United Kingdom) Parr Motorsport |
| 2009 | (United Kingdom) Tim Bridgman | (United Kingdom) Team Parker Racing | (United Kingdom) Glynn Geddie | (United Kingdom) Team Parker Racing | (United Kingdom) Glenn McMenamin | (United Kingdom) Parr Motorsport |
| 2010 | (United Kingdom) Tim Harvey (2) | (United Kingdom) Redline Racing | (United Kingdom) Ollie Jackson | (United Kingdom) Motorbase Performance | (United Kingdom) George Richardson | (United Kingdom) Motorbase Performance |
| 2011 | (United Kingdom) James Sutton (2) | (United Kingdom) Redline Racing | (Lithuania) Jonas Gelžinis | (Lithuania) Juta Racing | (United Kingdom) George Brewster | (United Kingdom) Celtic Speed |
| 2012 | (United Kingdom) Michael Meadows | (United Kingdom) Redline Racing | (Oman) Ahmad Al Harthy | (United Kingdom) Redline Racing | (United Kingdom) Will Goff | (United Kingdom) Goff Racing |
| 2013 | (United Kingdom) Michael Meadows (2) | (United Kingdom) Samsung Smart Motorsport | (Spain) Víctor Jiménez | (United Kingdom) Redline Racing | (United Kingdom) Pete Smallwood | (United Kingdom) Parr Motorsport |
| 2014 | (United Kingdom) Josh Webster | (United Kingdom) Redline Racing | (United Kingdom) Justin Sherwood | (United Kingdom) Team Parker Racing | (United Kingdom) Steve Liquorish | (United Kingdom) Team Parker Racing |
| 2015 | (United Kingdom) Dan Cammish | (United Kingdom) Redline Racing | (Lithuania) Ignas Gelžinis | (Lithuania) Juta Racing | (United Kingdom) John McCullagh | (United Kingdom) Redline Racing |
| 2016 | (United Kingdom) Dan Cammish (2) | (United Kingdom) Redline Racing | (United Kingdom) Euan McKay | (United Kingdom) IN2 Racing | (Lithuania) Tautvydas Barštys | (Lithuania) Juta Racing |
| 2017 | (Republic of Ireland) Charlie Eastwood | (United Kingdom) Redline Racing | (United Kingdom) Alex Martin | (United Kingdom) Team Parker Racing | (United Kingdom) Peter Kyle-Henney | (United Kingdom) IN2 Racing |
| Season | Pro Champion | Pro Team Champion | Pro-Am Champion | Pro-Am Team | Am Champion | Am Team |
| 2018 | (Cyprus) Tio Ellinas | (United Kingdom) JTR | (United Kingdom) Seb Perez | (United Kingdom) Team Parker Racing | (United Kingdom) Peter Mangion | (United Kingdom) Team Parker Racing |
| 2019 | (United Kingdom) Daniel Harper | (United Kingdom) JTR | (Republic of Ireland) Karl Leonard | (United Kingdom) Team Parker Racing | (United Kingdom) Justin Sherwood | (United Kingdom) Team Parker Racing |
| 2020 | (United Kingdom) Harry King | (United Kingdom) Team Parker Racing | (United Kingdom) Esmee Hawkey | (United Kingdom) Team Parker Racing | (United Kingdom) Justin Sherwood | (United Kingdom) Team Parker Racing |
| 2021 | (United Kingdom) Dan Cammish (3) | | (United Kingdom) Ryan Ratcliffe | | (United Kingdom) Justin Sherwood | |
| 2022 | (United Kingdom) Kiern Jewiss | | (United Kingdom) Charles Rainford | | (United Kingdom) Josh Stanton | |
| 2023 | (United Kingdom) Adam Smalley | | (United Kingdom) Max Bird | | (United Kingdom) Justin Sherwood | |
| 2024 | (United Kingdom) George Gamble | | (United Kingdom) Angus Whiteside | | (United Kingdom) Lee Mowle | |
| 2025 | (South Africa) Andrew Rackstraw | | (United Kingdom) Oliver White | | (United Kingdom) Jonathan Beeson | |
| 2026 | (United Kingdom) Callum Voisin | | (United Kingdom) Stephen Jelley | | (United Kingdom) Carl Cavers | |
| 2027 | | | | | | |
