= Jonas Gelžinis =

Lithuanian racing driver (born 1988)

- Gelžinis in 2022
- Nationality: Lithuanian
- Born: 2 March 1988 (age 38) Kaunas, Lithuania
- Relatives: Ignas Gelžinis (brother)

Porsche Carrera Cup Great Britain career
- Debut season: 2010
- Current team: Juta Racing
- Categorisation: FIA Silver
- Car number: 8
- Starts: 66
- Wins: 4
- Poles: 3
- Fastest laps: 6

Previous series
- Volkswagen Castrol Cup; Porsche Carrera Cup Great Britain; Porsche Carrera Cup Great Scandinavia

Championship titles
- 2011 2006, 2008–09, 2014–17, 2019–20: Porsche Carrera Cup Great Britain Pro Am1 class 1000 kilometrų lenktynės

Jonas Gelžinis (born 2 March 1988) is a Lithuanian racing driver. He won Porsche Carrera Cup Great Britain Pro-Am1 class champion title in 2011. From 2012, he raced in Pro class and finished runner up in 2013. He is also a record ten-time winner of the Palanga 1000km Challenge. He was selected for FIA 2012 Young Driver Excellence Academy. Only 18 young talented drivers were selected from around the world. Moreover, he was also selected for 2013 PORSCHE INTERNATIONAL CUP SCHOLARSHIP shootout. Together with Earl Bamber, Johan Kristoffersson and other top drivers from Porsche Carrera Cups. His younger brother Ignas Gelžinis is also racing driver.

== Career summary ==
=== Early years ===
In the beginning of his career, Gelžinis became a Lithuanian kart champion in "Raket" class. From 2001 to 2003, he was a leading driver in "ICA Junior" class.

In 2005, Gelžinis went to rallying. In rally "Aplink Lietuvą" (eng. "Around Lithuania") he finished fourth in "A/R 2000" class. In the 2006 rally "Kauno ruduo", he finished second in his "A/R 2000" class. That same year, he also participated in 1000 kilometrų lenktynės for the first time and finished third overall and took a victory in his class. He won the race in 2006. Gelžinis later repeated this achievement in 2008, 2009, 2014 and 2015.

From 2005 to 2006, Gelžinis was competing in Volkswagen Castrol Cup. In his rookie year he took one third-place finish, set fastest lap time twice and ended the season in 8th place overall. In the following year, he finished as runner-up.

=== 2007-2009: Porsche Carrera Cup Scandinavia ===
In 2007, Gelžinis made his debut in "Porsche Carrera Cup Scandinavia" together with Juta Racing. In his debut season, he scored 12 points and took 13th place in final standings. In the following year, he enjoyed greater success, scored 131 points and took seventh place in final standings. The 2009 season was even more successful, as Gelžinis scored 269 points, including one second-place finish, and took fifth place in final standings.

=== 2010-2013: Porsche Carrera Cup Great Britain ===
After successful 2009 Porsche Carrera Cup season in Scandinavia, in 2010, Gelžinis moved to Porsche Carrera Cup Great Britain, participating in "Pro-AM1" class. He demonstrated stable results thorough the season and scored 143 points. This was enough to take tenth place in overall standings and 3rd in "Pro-AM1" class.

In 2011, Gelžinis continued to drive for the Juta Racing team. Jonas Gelžinis continued to impress and took sixth place in overall standings, scoring 167 points and became the winner of "Pro-AM1" class. He also scored pole position in Donington, second round of the season, but during the race he was unable to defend this position from rivals who were driving more powerful cars. Fourth place finish was his best result of the season.

After victory in "Pro-AM1" class, in 2012 Gelžinis stepped up into "Pro" class. He enjoyed immediate success, taking four podium finishes in Brands Hatch and Donington. After setback in Thruxton, Gelžinis took four more podiums in Oulton Park and Croft Circuit. The second half of the season was less successful, as he was disqualified from the first race in Snetterton and took only two podium finishes in Rockingham and Silverstone. He ended the season with high note, taking his and the team's first race victory in Porsche Carrera Cup Great Britain in the final round of the season, held in Brands Hatch. Gelžinis took fourth place in final standings with 259 points.

Gelžinis continued to demonstrate strong form in 2013, finishing on podium in the first six races of the season and taking the championship lead. This was the first time in Porsche Carrera Cup Great Britain history when racing driver from outside United Kingdom had taken the lead in the standings. After unsuccessful weekend in Oulton Park Gelžinis lost championship lead to Michael Meadows, but then took three victories in a row in Croft Circuit and Snetterton. Gelžinis took four more podium finishes in the second half of the season and kept his championship hopes until the final round. However, he was unable to regain championship lead and ended the season in second place with 310 points - 15 points less than champion Michael Meadows.

Gelžinis was selected for FIA 2012 Young Driver Excellence Academy. Only 18 young- talented drivers were selected from around the world.

Gelžinis was also selected for 2013 PORSCHE INTERNATIONAL CUP SCHOLARSHIP shootout. Together with Earl Bamber, Johan Kristoffersson and other top drivers from Porsche Carrera Cups.

=== 2023 ===
In 2023, Gelžinis formed part of the driver lineup for Juta Racing's entry into the ADAC GT Masters, as they became the first Lithuanian team to enter the series.
