= Liqui Moly =

German company specializing in oils, lubricants and additives

Liqui Moly GmbH
- Company type: Private
- Genre: Automotive service
- Founded: 1957; 69 years ago
- Headquarters: Ulm, Germany
- Products: motor oils, lubricants and additives
- Revenue: 917 million Euro (as of December 2023)
- Owner: Würth Group
- Number of employees: 1104 (as of December 2023)
- Website: liqui-moly.com

Liqui Moly GmbH is a German company specializing in oils, lubricants and additives. As of January 1, 2018, Liqui Moly is part of the Würth Group, which bought the remaining shares of the previous majority holder and CEO Ernst Prost. From 2018 to 2022, Günter Hiermaier was the second managing director alongside long-time managing director Ernst Prost. Prost retired in February 2022 on the occasion of his 65th birthday. Günter Hiermaier then served as the sole managing director of Liqui Moly until 2022. The Ulm-based company's long-time commercial director, Uli Weller, became the group's second managing director at the turn of 2023.

== Founding ==
Liqui Moly GmbH was founded in 1957 in Ulm on the river Danube. The patent for the production of molybdenum disulfide (MoS_{2}) formed the basis for the company. This additive based on liquified molybdenum disulfide (MoS_{2}) was the company's first product and gave it its name. Molybdenum sulfide, the basic ingredient of the Liqui Moly Oil additive, was discovered in the shops of the US Army in post-war Germany. These shops sold a can named Liqui Moly that contained the liquid form of the solid lubricant molybdenum sulfide (MoS_{2}). When added to motor oil, this substance ensures emergency running characteristics in the event of a sudden loss of oil. Fighter pilots in World War I had already exploited this property, adding MoS_{2} to motor oil in the aircraft engines. This enabled pilots to still land, even if the oil tank was hit.

== Products ==
Liqui Moly's main product is motor oil with MoS_{2}, but there are also other lubricants with MoS_{2} and the additive MoS_{2} itself to be added by the end-user during oil changes. Molybdenum disulfide enhances the lubrication quality of the oil and offers emergency operating features under harsh conditions. It can be added to motor oils and non-motor oils, including gear oil, transmission oil or differentials oils. An entire range was developed from this additive, with over 4,000 products, including engine and gear oils, additives and care products, workshop equipment, and service products. In Germany, Liqui Moly is one of the leading producers of engine oils. Germany remains the main marketplace, but international demands are increasing. Liqui Moly products are now sold in 120 countries.

== Sponsoring ==
=== Motorsports ===
Liqui Moly sponsors Engstler Motorsport and FCP Euro in the TCR touring car series. The Liqui Moly Team Engstler participates in TCR Asia, TCR Middle East, and ADAC TCR Germany 2017. Since 2013, the company has partnered with the motorcycle team Intact GP in the Moto2 class with riders Xavi Vierge and Marcel Schrötter.

Liqui Moly was a sponsor in veoautokross and for Mikk Mäesaar in the 2018-19 season.

The brand also entered the 2018 IMSA WeatherTech SportsCar Championship in partnership with Turner Motorsport and participated in the 24 Hours of Daytona.

In July 2020, Liqui Moly became the official sponsor of Formula 1. The 3-year deal started at the 2020 Styrian Grand Prix and will run until the end of the 2022 Formula 1 World Championship season. In March 2023, the sponsorship was extended for the 2023 season.

=== Other sports ===
Liqui Moly has sponsored the German football club TSV 1860 Munich between 2002 and 2005 and Bosnian football club FK Željezničar Sarajevo between 2005 and 2007.

Since 2017, the company has sponsored the Los Angeles Kings of the National Hockey League (NHL). The company has also officially sponsored the Men's Ice Hockey World Championships.

Since September 2018, Liqui Moly has been an official sponsor of the Chicago Bulls in the National Basketball Association (NBA).

In team handball, the company has been the title sponsor of two top European leagues, Germany's Handball-Bundesliga (since 2019) and France's Starligue (since 2021).

Liqui Moly has also sponsored videos on the YouTube channel DriveTribe, founded by Jeremy Clarkson, Richard Hammond, and James May from Top Gear and The Grand Tour.

Since 2024, Liqui Moly has been an official sponsor of the SSV Ulm.

== See also ==
- Lubricants
- Internal combustion engine
