= Palanga Circuit =

Motorsport track in Lithuania

Palangos trasa
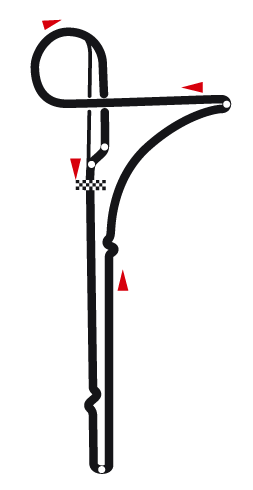
- Original Circuit (2000–2013)
- Location: Palanga, Lithuania
- Coordinates: 55°54′29″N 21°06′22″E
- Opened: 27 August 2000; 25 years ago
- Major events: Current: 1006 km of Palanga (2000–present)

Full Circuit (2014–present)
- Length: 2.681 km (1.666 mi)
- Turns: 12
- Race lap record: 1:05.425 ( (Denmark) Anders Fjordbach, Mercedes-AMG GT3 Evo, 2023, GT3)

Original Circuit (2000–2013)
- Length: 2.994 km (1.860 mi)
- Turns: 11
- Race lap record: 1:17.270 ( (Lithuania) Ramūnas Čapkauskas, Aquila CR1, 2012, Sports car racing)

The Palanga Circuit is a temporary race track located in the Lithuanian resort town of Palanga. An annual 1000 km race has been held on this circuit since 2000.

== Track information ==
The track is 2.681 km (1.666 mi) street circuit. The race track lies on the intersection of the A11 and A13 highways.

== Lap records ==
As of July 2026, the fastest official lap records at the Palanga circuit are listed as:

Category	Time	Driver	Vehicle	Event
Full Circuit (2014–present): 2.681 km (1.666 mi)
GT3	1:05.425	Anders Fjordbach	Mercedes-AMG GT3 Evo	2023 1006 km of Palanga
Lamborghini Super Trofeo	1:07.832	Paulius Paškevičius	Lamborghini Huracán LP 620-2 Super Trofeo EVO2	2023 1006 km of Palanga
Porsche Carrera Cup	1:07.892	Benjamin Barker	Porsche 911 (992 I) GT3 Cup	2026 1006 km of Palanga
Sports car racing	1.08.966	Konstantīns Calko	Radical SR8	2014 1000 kilometrų lenktynės
GT4	1:12.020	Valters Zviedris	Porsche 718 Cayman GT4 RS Clubsport	2024 1006 km of Palanga
TCR Touring Car	1:14.529	Adomas Petrovas	SEAT León Cup Racer	2023 1006 km of Palanga
Original Circuit (2000–2013): 2.994 km (1.860 mi)
Sports car racing	1.17.270	Ramūnas Čapkauskas	Aquila CR1	2012 1000 kilometrų lenktynės
