= 2014 Blancpain Endurance Series =

Sports season

Seasons
- ← 2013 2015 →

The 2014 Blancpain Endurance Series season was the fourth season of the Blancpain Endurance Series. The season started on 12 April at Monza and ended on 21 September at the Nürburgring. The season featured five rounds, with each race lasting for a duration of three hours besides the 24 Hours of Spa-Francorchamps and the 1000 km Nürburgring events.

The main trophy of the series, the Pro Cup for drivers, was won by Laurens Vanthoor of the Belgian Audi Club Team WRT squad; Vanthoor won each of the last two races to be held during the season, winning at Spa with René Rast and Markus Winkelhock at the Nürburgring with César Ramos and Christopher Mies. Vanthoor finished 36 points clear of his nearest rivals, Steven Kane, Andy Meyrick and Guy Smith, driving a Bentley for M-Sport. The trio also won two races during the season, at Le Castellet and Silverstone. The season opening round was won by ART Grand Prix, with drivers Grégoire Demoustier, Álvaro Parente and Alexandre Prémat. Belgian Audi Club Team WRT were the winners of the teams' championship, finishing 32 points clear of M-Sport and HTP Motorsport.

Despite not winning a race over the course of the season, Scuderia Villorba Corse drivers Stefano Gai and Andrea Rizzoli were the winners of the Pro-Am Cup. Francesco Castellacci finished in third position; having been a part of the Villorba Corse line-up with Gai and Rizzoli earlier in the season, Castellacci contested the final round with AF Corse. The highest-placed race winners were Henry Hassid and Nick Catsburg, who finished fourth in the championship, as the only crew to win more than one event in the Pro-Am Cup. Scuderia Villorba Corse won the teams' championship, three points ahead of TDS Racing. AF Corse's Peter Mann and Francisco Guedes won the Gentlemen Drivers' Trophy, finishing eight points clear of GT Corse by Rinaldi pairing Alexander Mattschull and Frank Schmickler, who won three races to the single victory of Mann and Guedes. AF Corse also denied GT Corse by Rinaldi the teams' title, by just a single point.

== Calendar ==
In November 2013, the Stéphane Ratel Organisation announced the 2014 calendar. The calendar was the same as the previous season. The race at Circuit Paul Ricard was held on Saturday evening, finishing in night-time conditions.

Rnd	Race	Circuit	Date	Report
1	3 Hours of Monza	Autodromo Nazionale Monza, Italy	13 April	Report
2	3 Hours of Silverstone	Silverstone Circuit, United Kingdom	25 May	Report
3	3 Hours of Paul Ricard	Circuit Paul Ricard, France	28 June	Report
4	Total 24 Hours of Spa	Circuit de Spa-Francorchamps, Belgium	27 July	Report
5	iRacing.com 1000 km Nürburgring	Nürburgring, Germany	21 September	Report

== Entry list ==
2014 entry list
Team	Car	No.	Drivers	Rounds
Pro Cup
(Belgium) Belgian Audi Club Team WRT	Audi R8 LMS ultra	1	(Belgium) Laurens Vanthoor	All
(Belgium) Belgian Audi Club Team WRT	Audi R8 LMS ultra	1	(Brazil) César Ramos	1–3, 5
(Belgium) Belgian Audi Club Team WRT	Audi R8 LMS ultra	1	(Germany) Marc Basseng	1–3
(Belgium) Belgian Audi Club Team WRT	Audi R8 LMS ultra	1	(Germany) René Rast	4
(Belgium) Belgian Audi Club Team WRT	Audi R8 LMS ultra	1	(Germany) Markus Winkelhock	4
(Belgium) Belgian Audi Club Team WRT	Audi R8 LMS ultra	1	(Germany) Christopher Mies	5
(Belgium) Belgian Audi Club Team WRT	Audi R8 LMS ultra	2	(Germany) André Lotterer	4
(Belgium) Belgian Audi Club Team WRT	Audi R8 LMS ultra	2	(Switzerland) Marcel Fässler	4
(Belgium) Belgian Audi Club Team WRT	Audi R8 LMS ultra	2	(France) Benoît Tréluyer	4
(Belgium) Belgian Audi Club Team WRT	Audi R8 LMS ultra	3	(Germany) Christopher Mies	1–4
(Belgium) Belgian Audi Club Team WRT	Audi R8 LMS ultra	3	(Germany) Frank Stippler	All
(Belgium) Belgian Audi Club Team WRT	Audi R8 LMS ultra	3	(United Kingdom) James Nash	All
(Belgium) Belgian Audi Club Team WRT	Audi R8 LMS ultra	3	(Germany) Marc Basseng	5
(United Kingdom) M-Sport Bentley	Bentley Continental GT3	7	(United Kingdom) Steven Kane	All
(United Kingdom) M-Sport Bentley	Bentley Continental GT3	7	(United Kingdom) Guy Smith	All
(United Kingdom) M-Sport Bentley	Bentley Continental GT3	7	(United Kingdom) Andy Meyrick	All
(United Kingdom) M-Sport Bentley	Bentley Continental GT3	8	(Belgium) Jérôme d'Ambrosio	All
(United Kingdom) M-Sport Bentley	Bentley Continental GT3	8	(United Kingdom) Duncan Tappy	All
(United Kingdom) M-Sport Bentley	Bentley Continental GT3	8	(France) Antoine Leclerc	All
(Switzerland) Emil Frey Racing	Jaguar XK Emil Frey G3	14	(Switzerland) Fredy Barth	5
(Switzerland) Emil Frey Racing	Jaguar XK Emil Frey G3	14	(Switzerland) Gabriele Gardel	5
(Switzerland) Emil Frey Racing	Jaguar XK Emil Frey G3	14	(Switzerland) Jonathan Hirschi	5
(Germany) Black Falcon	Mercedes-Benz SLS AMG GT3	19	(Saudi Arabia) Abdulaziz Al Faisal	All
(Germany) Black Falcon	Mercedes-Benz SLS AMG GT3	19	(Germany) Hubert Haupt	All
(Germany) Black Falcon	Mercedes-Benz SLS AMG GT3	19	(Sweden) Andreas Simonsen	All
(Germany) Black Falcon	Mercedes-Benz SLS AMG GT3	63	(France) Mike Parisy	4
(Germany) Black Falcon	Mercedes-Benz SLS AMG GT3	63	(United Kingdom) Adam Christodoulou	4
(Germany) Black Falcon	Mercedes-Benz SLS AMG GT3	63	(Netherlands) Yelmer Buurman	4
(France) Saintéloc Racing	Audi R8 LMS ultra	26	(Monaco) Stéphane Ortelli	All
(France) Saintéloc Racing	Audi R8 LMS ultra	26	(France) Grégory Guilvert	All
(France) Saintéloc Racing	Audi R8 LMS ultra	26	(Sweden) Edward Sandström	All
(United Kingdom) Leonard Motorsport AMR	Aston Martin V12 Vantage GT3	32	(United Kingdom) Stuart Leonard	2
(United Kingdom) Leonard Motorsport AMR	Aston Martin V12 Vantage GT3	32	(United Kingdom) Paul Wilson	2
(United Kingdom) Leonard Motorsport AMR	Aston Martin V12 Vantage GT3	32	(United Kingdom) Jonathan Adam	2
Oman Racing Team	Aston Martin V12 Vantage GT3	44	(United Kingdom) Michael Caine	All
Oman Racing Team	Aston Martin V12 Vantage GT3	44	(Oman) Ahmad Al Harthy	All
Oman Racing Team	Aston Martin V12 Vantage GT3	44	(United Kingdom) Stephen Jelley	1–4
Oman Racing Team	Aston Martin V12 Vantage GT3	44	(United Kingdom) Joe Osborne	5
(China) Brothers Racing Team	Audi R8 LMS ultra	55	(China) Cheng Congfu	1–3
(China) Brothers Racing Team	Audi R8 LMS ultra	55	(China) Sun Zheng	1–3
(China) Brothers Racing Team	Audi R8 LMS ultra	55	(Macau) André Couto	1–3
(Belgium) BMW Sports Trophy Team Marc VDS	BMW Z4 GT3	66	(Belgium) Maxime Martin	4
(Belgium) BMW Sports Trophy Team Marc VDS	BMW Z4 GT3	66	(Germany) Jörg Müller	4
(Belgium) BMW Sports Trophy Team Marc VDS	BMW Z4 GT3	66	(Brazil) Augusto Farfus	4
(Belgium) BMW Sports Trophy Team Marc VDS	BMW Z4 GT3	77	(Germany) Lucas Luhr	4
(Belgium) BMW Sports Trophy Team Marc VDS	BMW Z4 GT3	77	(Finland) Markus Palttala	4
(Belgium) BMW Sports Trophy Team Marc VDS	BMW Z4 GT3	77	(Germany) Dirk Werner	4
(Czech Republic) ISR Racing	Audi R8 LMS ultra	75	(Czech Republic) Filip Salaquarda	4
(Czech Republic) ISR Racing	Audi R8 LMS ultra	75	(Germany) Fabian Hamprecht	4
(Czech Republic) ISR Racing	Audi R8 LMS ultra	75	(Germany) Marc Basseng	4
(Germany) HTP Motorsport	Mercedes-Benz SLS AMG GT3	84	(Switzerland) Harold Primat	All
(Germany) HTP Motorsport	Mercedes-Benz SLS AMG GT3	84	(Belgium) Nico Verdonck	All
(Germany) HTP Motorsport	Mercedes-Benz SLS AMG GT3	84	(Germany) Maximilian Buhk	1, 3
(Germany) HTP Motorsport	Mercedes-Benz SLS AMG GT3	84	(Germany) Bernd Schneider	2, 4–5
(Germany) HTP Motorsport	Mercedes-Benz SLS AMG GT3	85	(Russia) Sergey Afanasyev	All
(Germany) HTP Motorsport	Mercedes-Benz SLS AMG GT3	85	(Netherlands) Stef Dusseldorp	All
(Germany) HTP Motorsport	Mercedes-Benz SLS AMG GT3	85	(Germany) Lucas Wolf	1–3
(Germany) HTP Motorsport	Mercedes-Benz SLS AMG GT3	85	(Netherlands) Xavier Maassen	4
(Germany) HTP Motorsport	Mercedes-Benz SLS AMG GT3	85	(Germany) Maximilian Buhk	5
(Germany) HTP Motorsport	Mercedes-Benz SLS AMG GT3	86	(Germany) Maximilian Buhk	4
(Germany) HTP Motorsport	Mercedes-Benz SLS AMG GT3	86	(Germany) Maximilian Götz	4
(Germany) HTP Motorsport	Mercedes-Benz SLS AMG GT3	86	(Malaysia) Jazeman Jaafar	4
(Germany) Reiter Engineering	Lamborghini Gallardo FL2	88	(Netherlands) Peter Kox	1
(Germany) Reiter Engineering	Lamborghini Gallardo FL2	88	(Germany) Albert von Thurn und Taxis	1
(Germany) Reiter Engineering	Lamborghini Gallardo FL2	88	(Czech Republic) Tomáš Enge	1
(France) ART Grand Prix	McLaren MP4-12C GT3	98	(France) Grégoire Demoustier	All
(France) ART Grand Prix	McLaren MP4-12C GT3	98	(Portugal) Álvaro Parente	All
(France) ART Grand Prix	McLaren MP4-12C GT3	98	(France) Alexandre Prémat	1–2, 5
(France) ART Grand Prix	McLaren MP4-12C GT3	98	(France) Nicolas Lapierre	3–4
(France) ART Grand Prix	McLaren MP4-12C GT3	99	(Spain) Andy Soucek	All
(France) ART Grand Prix	McLaren MP4-12C GT3	99	(Estonia) Kevin Korjus	All
(France) ART Grand Prix	McLaren MP4-12C GT3	99	(France) Kévin Estre	All
(New Zealand) Von Ryan Racing	McLaren MP4-12C GT3	101	(New Zealand) Shane van Gisbergen	4
(New Zealand) Von Ryan Racing	McLaren MP4-12C GT3	101	(United Kingdom) Rob Bell	4
(New Zealand) Von Ryan Racing	McLaren MP4-12C GT3	101	(United Kingdom) Tim Mullen	4
(United Kingdom) Triple 888 Racing	BMW Z4 GT3	888	(United Kingdom) Jody Firth	5
(United Kingdom) Triple 888 Racing	BMW Z4 GT3	888	(United Kingdom) Warren Hughes	5
(United Kingdom) Triple 888 Racing	BMW Z4 GT3	888	(United Kingdom) Alexander Sims	5
(Germany) Audi Race Experience	Audi R8 LMS ultra	1000	(Switzerland) Didier Cuche	5
(Germany) Audi Race Experience	Audi R8 LMS ultra	1000	(Switzerland) Rahel Frey	5
(Germany) Audi Race Experience	Audi R8 LMS ultra	1000	(Switzerland) Nico Müller	5
Pro-Am Cup
(Belgium) Belgian Audi Club Team WRT	Audi R8 LMS ultra	4	(France) Jean-Luc Blanchemain	4–5
(Belgium) Belgian Audi Club Team WRT	Audi R8 LMS ultra	4	(Belgium) Christian Kelders	4–5
(Belgium) Belgian Audi Club Team WRT	Audi R8 LMS ultra	4	(Belgium) Fred Bouvy	4
(Belgium) Belgian Audi Club Team WRT	Audi R8 LMS ultra	4	(Belgium) Vincent Radermecker	4
(Belgium) Belgian Audi Club Team WRT	Audi R8 LMS ultra	4	(Monaco) Stéphane Richelmi	5
(France) TDS Racing	BMW Z4 GT3	10	(France) Eric Clément	All
(France) TDS Racing	BMW Z4 GT3	10	(France) Benjamin Lariche	All
(France) TDS Racing	BMW Z4 GT3	10	(France) Nicolas Armindo	All
(France) TDS Racing	BMW Z4 GT3	10	(France) Olivier Pla	4
(France) TDS Racing	BMW Z4 GT3	12	(France) Henry Hassid	All
(France) TDS Racing	BMW Z4 GT3	12	(Netherlands) Nick Catsburg	All
(France) TDS Racing	BMW Z4 GT3	12	(France) Pierre Thiriet	4
(France) TDS Racing	BMW Z4 GT3	12	(Germany) Jens Klingmann	4
(Switzerland) Kessel Racing	Ferrari 458 Italia GT3	11	(Poland) Michał Broniszewski	All
(Switzerland) Kessel Racing	Ferrari 458 Italia GT3	11	(Italy) Alessandro Bonacini	All
(Switzerland) Kessel Racing	Ferrari 458 Italia GT3	11	(Italy) Giacomo Petrobelli	1–2
(Switzerland) Kessel Racing	Ferrari 458 Italia GT3	11	(Italy) Marco Frezza	3–5
(Switzerland) Kessel Racing	Ferrari 458 Italia GT3	11	(Italy) Giacomo Piccini	4
(Switzerland) Emil Frey Racing	Jaguar XK Emil Frey G3	14	(Switzerland) Fredy Barth	1–4
(Switzerland) Emil Frey Racing	Jaguar XK Emil Frey G3	14	(Switzerland) Lorenz Frey	1–4
(Switzerland) Emil Frey Racing	Jaguar XK Emil Frey G3	14	(Switzerland) Gabriele Gardel	1–4
(Switzerland) Emil Frey Racing	Jaguar XK Emil Frey G3	14	(Switzerland) Jonathan Hirschi	4
(Belgium) Boutsen Ginion	McLaren MP4-12C GT3	15	(Saudi Arabia) Karim Ojjeh	1–4
(Belgium) Boutsen Ginion	McLaren MP4-12C GT3	15	(Luxembourg) Olivier Grotz	1–4
(Belgium) Boutsen Ginion	McLaren MP4-12C GT3	15	(Belgium) Frédéric Vervisch	1–4
(Belgium) Boutsen Ginion	McLaren MP4-12C GT3	15	(Italy) Giorgio Pantano	4
(Belgium) Boutsen Ginion	McLaren MP4-12C GT3	16	(Lebanon) Shahan Sarkissian	All
(Belgium) Boutsen Ginion	McLaren MP4-12C GT3	16	(Lebanon) Alex Demirdjian	1–4
(Belgium) Boutsen Ginion	McLaren MP4-12C GT3	16	(United Kingdom) Phil Quaife	1–2
(Belgium) Boutsen Ginion	McLaren MP4-12C GT3	16	(New Zealand) Chris van der Drift	3–5
(Belgium) Boutsen Ginion	McLaren MP4-12C GT3	16	(Belgium) Michael Schmetz	4
(Belgium) Boutsen Ginion	McLaren MP4-12C GT3	16	(South Africa) Jordan Grogor	5
(Denmark) Insightracing with Flex-Box	Ferrari 458 Italia GT3	17	(Denmark) Dennis Andersen	All
(Denmark) Insightracing with Flex-Box	Ferrari 458 Italia GT3	17	(Denmark) Martin Jensen	All
(Denmark) Insightracing with Flex-Box	Ferrari 458 Italia GT3	17	(United States) Jason Yeomans	4
(Germany) Black Falcon	Mercedes-Benz SLS AMG GT3	18	(Russia) Vladimir Lunkin	All
(Germany) Black Falcon	Mercedes-Benz SLS AMG GT3	18	(Russia) Yury Loboda	1–3
(Germany) Black Falcon	Mercedes-Benz SLS AMG GT3	18	(Russia) Mikhail Loboda	1–3
(Germany) Black Falcon	Mercedes-Benz SLS AMG GT3	18	(Australia) Richard Muscat	4
(Germany) Black Falcon	Mercedes-Benz SLS AMG GT3	18	(Saudi Arabia) Saud Turki Al Faisal	4
(Germany) Black Falcon	Mercedes-Benz SLS AMG GT3	18	(Germany) Christian Bracke	4
(Germany) Black Falcon	Mercedes-Benz SLS AMG GT3	18	(Denmark) Anders Fjordbach	5
(Germany) Black Falcon	Mercedes-Benz SLS AMG GT3	18	(United Kingdom) Devon Modell	5
(Australia) Lago Racing	Lamborghini Gallardo LP600	23	(Australia) Roger Lago	4
(Australia) Lago Racing	Lamborghini Gallardo LP600	23	(Australia) David Russell	4
(Australia) Lago Racing	Lamborghini Gallardo LP600	23	(New Zealand) Steven Richards	4
(Australia) Lago Racing	Lamborghini Gallardo LP600	23	(Australia) Steve Owen	4
(United Kingdom) Leonard Motorsport AMR	Aston Martin V12 Vantage GT3	32	(United Kingdom) Stuart Leonard	4–5
(United Kingdom) Leonard Motorsport AMR	Aston Martin V12 Vantage GT3	32	(United Kingdom) Paul Wilson	4–5
(United Kingdom) Leonard Motorsport AMR	Aston Martin V12 Vantage GT3	32	(United Kingdom) Michael Meadows	4–5
(United Kingdom) Leonard Motorsport AMR	Aston Martin V12 Vantage GT3	32	(Portugal) Pedro Lamy	4
(United Kingdom) Nissan GT Academy Team RJN	Nissan GT-R Nismo GT3	35	(Portugal) Miguel Faísca	All
(United Kingdom) Nissan GT Academy Team RJN	Nissan GT-R Nismo GT3	35	(Japan) Katsumasa Chiyo	All
(United Kingdom) Nissan GT Academy Team RJN	Nissan GT-R Nismo GT3	35	(Russia) Mark Shulzhitskiy	1, 4
(United Kingdom) Nissan GT Academy Team RJN	Nissan GT-R Nismo GT3	35	(Russia) Stanislav Aksenov	2–3
(United Kingdom) Nissan GT Academy Team RJN	Nissan GT-R Nismo GT3	35	(Japan) Masataka Yanagida	4
(United Kingdom) Nissan GT Academy Team RJN	Nissan GT-R Nismo GT3	35	(Belgium) Wolfgang Reip	5
(United Kingdom) Nissan GT Academy Team RJN	Nissan GT-R Nismo GT3	80	(Germany) Florian Strauss	All
(United Kingdom) Nissan GT Academy Team RJN	Nissan GT-R Nismo GT3	80	(United States) Nick McMillen	All
(United Kingdom) Nissan GT Academy Team RJN	Nissan GT-R Nismo GT3	80	(United Kingdom) Alex Buncombe	All
(United Kingdom) Nissan GT Academy Team RJN	Nissan GT-R Nismo GT3	80	(Belgium) Wolfgang Reip	4
(United Kingdom) MP Motorsport AMR	Aston Martin V12 Vantage GT3	38	(United Kingdom) Richard Abra	All
(United Kingdom) MP Motorsport AMR	Aston Martin V12 Vantage GT3	38	(United Kingdom) Mark Poole	All
(United Kingdom) MP Motorsport AMR	Aston Martin V12 Vantage GT3	38	(United Kingdom) Joe Osborne	All
(United Kingdom) MP Motorsport AMR	Aston Martin V12 Vantage GT3	38	(United Kingdom) Darren Turner	4
(France) Sport Garage	Ferrari 458 Italia GT3	42	(France) Gilles Vannelet	1–3
(France) Sport Garage	Ferrari 458 Italia GT3	42	(Belgium) Michael Albert	1–3
(France) Sport Garage	Ferrari 458 Italia GT3	42	(Belgium) Stéphane Lémeret	1–3
(Italy) ROAL Motorsport	BMW Z4 GT3	43	(Italy) Stefano Comandini	All
(Italy) ROAL Motorsport	BMW Z4 GT3	43	(Italy) Eugenio Amos	All
(Italy) ROAL Motorsport	BMW Z4 GT3	43	(Italy) Stefano Colombo	1, 3–4
(Italy) ROAL Motorsport	BMW Z4 GT3	43	(Italy) Michela Cerruti	2, 4–5
(Italy) AF Corse	Ferrari 458 Italia GT3	50	(Canada) Andrew Danyliw	All
(Italy) AF Corse	Ferrari 458 Italia GT3	50	(Netherlands) Simon Knap	All
(Italy) AF Corse	Ferrari 458 Italia GT3	50	(Italy) Andrea Sonvico	All
(Italy) AF Corse	Ferrari 458 Italia GT3	50	(Italy) Alessandro Pier Guidi	4
(Italy) AF Corse	Ferrari 458 Italia GT3	52	(Australia) Steve Wyatt	4
(Italy) AF Corse	Ferrari 458 Italia GT3	52	(Italy) Michele Rugolo	4
(Italy) AF Corse	Ferrari 458 Italia GT3	52	(Australia) Craig Lowndes	4
(Italy) AF Corse	Ferrari 458 Italia GT3	52	(Italy) Andrea Piccini	4
(Italy) AF Corse	Ferrari 458 Italia GT3	52	(Denmark) Johnny Laursen	5
(Italy) AF Corse	Ferrari 458 Italia GT3	52	(Germany) Marco Seefried	5
(Italy) AF Corse	Ferrari 458 Italia GT3	52	(Monaco) Francesco Castellacci	5
(Italy) AF Corse	Ferrari 458 Italia GT3	53	(Belgium) Niek Hommerson	4
(Italy) AF Corse	Ferrari 458 Italia GT3	53	(Belgium) Louis Machiels	4
(Italy) AF Corse	Ferrari 458 Italia GT3	53	(Italy) Andrea Bertolini	4
(Italy) AF Corse	Ferrari 458 Italia GT3	53	(Italy) Marco Cioci	4
(Italy) AF Corse	Ferrari 458 Italia GT3	54	(United Kingdom) Duncan Cameron	4
(Italy) AF Corse	Ferrari 458 Italia GT3	54	(Republic of Ireland) Matt Griffin	4
(Italy) AF Corse	Ferrari 458 Italia GT3	54	(United Kingdom) Alex Mortimer	4
(France) Graff Racing	Porsche 997 GT3 R	70	(France) Eric Trouillet	1–3
(France) Graff Racing	Porsche 997 GT3 R	70	(France) Nicolas Marroc	1–2
(France) Graff Racing	Porsche 997 GT3 R	70	(France) Roland Bervillé	3
(France) Graff Racing	Porsche 997 GT3 R	70	(France) Lonni Martins	3
(United Kingdom) Ecurie Ecosse	BMW Z4 GT3	79	(United Kingdom) Oliver Bryant	All
(United Kingdom) Ecurie Ecosse	BMW Z4 GT3	79	(United Kingdom) Andrew Smith	All
(United Kingdom) Ecurie Ecosse	BMW Z4 GT3	79	(United Kingdom) Alasdair McCaig	All
(United Kingdom) Ecurie Ecosse	BMW Z4 GT3	79	(United Kingdom) Alexander Sims	4
(Russia) GT Russian Team	McLaren MP4-12C GT3	82	(Russia) Alexey Vasilyev	4
(Russia) GT Russian Team	McLaren MP4-12C GT3	82	(Estonia) Marko Asmer	4
(Russia) GT Russian Team	McLaren MP4-12C GT3	82	(Lithuania) Kazim Vasiliauskas	4
(Russia) GT Russian Team	McLaren MP4-12C GT3	82	(Germany) Florian Spengler	4
(Russia) GT Russian Team	Mercedes-Benz SLS AMG GT3	82	(Russia) Alexey Vasilyev	5
(Russia) GT Russian Team	Mercedes-Benz SLS AMG GT3	82	(Estonia) Marko Asmer	5
(Russia) GT Russian Team	Mercedes-Benz SLS AMG GT3	82	(United Arab Emirates) Karim Al Azhari	5
(Italy) Scuderia Villorba Corse	Ferrari 458 Italia GT3	90	(Italy) Andrea Rizzoli	All
(Italy) Scuderia Villorba Corse	Ferrari 458 Italia GT3	90	(Monaco) Francesco Castellacci	1–4
(Italy) Scuderia Villorba Corse	Ferrari 458 Italia GT3	90	(Italy) Stefano Gai	All
(Italy) Scuderia Villorba Corse	Ferrari 458 Italia GT3	90	(Italy) Andrea Montermini	4
(Italy) Scuderia Villorba Corse	Ferrari 458 Italia GT3	90	(Italy) Thomas Kemenater	5
(France) Pro GT by Alméras	Porsche 997 GT3 R	93	(France) Eric Dermont	1–4
(France) Pro GT by Alméras	Porsche 997 GT3 R	93	(France) Franck Perera	1–4
(France) Pro GT by Alméras	Porsche 997 GT3 R	93	(Italy) Marco Bonanomi	4
(France) Pro GT by Alméras	Porsche 997 GT3 R	93	Lucas Lasserre	4
(United Kingdom) PGF-Kinfaun AMR	Aston Martin V12 Vantage GT3	96	(United Kingdom) John Gaw	4
(United Kingdom) PGF-Kinfaun AMR	Aston Martin V12 Vantage GT3	96	(United Kingdom) Phil Dryburgh	4
(United Kingdom) PGF-Kinfaun AMR	Aston Martin V12 Vantage GT3	96	(United Kingdom) Paul White	4
(United Kingdom) PGF-Kinfaun AMR	Aston Martin V12 Vantage GT3	96	(United Kingdom) Tom Onslow-Cole	4
(Russia) SMP Racing Russian Bears	Ferrari 458 Italia GT3	100	(Russia) Viacheslav Maleev	4
(Russia) SMP Racing Russian Bears	Ferrari 458 Italia GT3	100	(Russia) Roman Mavlanov	4
(Russia) SMP Racing Russian Bears	Ferrari 458 Italia GT3	100	(Spain) José Manuel Pérez-Aicart	4
(Russia) SMP Racing Russian Bears	Ferrari 458 Italia GT3	100	(Italy) Daniel Zampieri	4
(United Kingdom) Beechdean AMR	Aston Martin V12 Vantage GT3	107	(United Kingdom) Andrew Howard	2, 4
(United Kingdom) Beechdean AMR	Aston Martin V12 Vantage GT3	107	(United Kingdom) Daniel Lloyd	2, 4
(United Kingdom) Beechdean AMR	Aston Martin V12 Vantage GT3	107	(United Kingdom) Alex MacDowall	2
(United Kingdom) Beechdean AMR	Aston Martin V12 Vantage GT3	107	(United Kingdom) Jonathan Adam	4
(United Kingdom) Beechdean AMR	Aston Martin V12 Vantage GT3	107	(Germany) Stefan Mücke	4
(France) SOFREV Auto Sport Promotion	Ferrari 458 Italia GT3	116	(France) Fabien Barthez	4
(France) SOFREV Auto Sport Promotion	Ferrari 458 Italia GT3	116	(France) Eric Debard	4
(France) SOFREV Auto Sport Promotion	Ferrari 458 Italia GT3	116	(France) Ludovic Badey	4
(France) SOFREV Auto Sport Promotion	Ferrari 458 Italia GT3	116	(France) Tristan Vautier	4
(France) SOFREV Auto Sport Promotion	Ferrari 458 Italia GT3	120	(France) Christophe Bourret	4
(France) SOFREV Auto Sport Promotion	Ferrari 458 Italia GT3	120	(France) Pascal Gibon	4
(France) SOFREV Auto Sport Promotion	Ferrari 458 Italia GT3	120	(France) Jean-Philippe Belloc	4
(France) SOFREV Auto Sport Promotion	Ferrari 458 Italia GT3	120	(France) Julien Canal	4
(Germany) Wochenspiegel Team Manthey	Porsche 997 GT3 R	150	(Germany) Georg Weiss	4
(Germany) Wochenspiegel Team Manthey	Porsche 997 GT3 R	150	(Germany) Oliver Kainz	4
(Germany) Wochenspiegel Team Manthey	Porsche 997 GT3 R	150	(Germany) Jochen Krumbach	4
(Germany) Wochenspiegel Team Manthey	Porsche 997 GT3 R	150	(Germany) Christian Menzel	4
(Switzerland) Fach Auto Tech	Porsche 997 GT3 R	188	(Germany) Otto Klohs	4
(Switzerland) Fach Auto Tech	Porsche 997 GT3 R	188	(Germany) Swen Dolenc	4
(Switzerland) Fach Auto Tech	Porsche 997 GT3 R	188	(Austria) Martin Ragginger	4
(Switzerland) Fach Auto Tech	Porsche 997 GT3 R	188	(Switzerland) Philipp Frommenwiler	4
(United Kingdom) Generation Bentley Racing	Bentley Continental GT3	200	(United Kingdom) James Appleby	2
(United Kingdom) Generation Bentley Racing	Bentley Continental GT3	200	(United Kingdom) Steve Tandy	2
(United Kingdom) Generation Bentley Racing	Bentley Continental GT3	200	(United Kingdom) Jody Fannin	2
(Germany) GT Corse by Rinaldi	Ferrari 458 Italia GT3	333	(Germany) Marco Seefried	1–4
(Germany) GT Corse by Rinaldi	Ferrari 458 Italia GT3	333	(Russia) Vadim Kogay	1–4
(Germany) GT Corse by Rinaldi	Ferrari 458 Italia GT3	333	(Russia) Rinat Salikhov	1–4
(Germany) GT Corse by Rinaldi	Ferrari 458 Italia GT3	333	(Austria) Norbert Siedler	4
(United Kingdom) Triple 888 Racing	BMW Z4 GT3	888	(United Kingdom) Ryan Ratcliffe	2
(United Kingdom) Triple 888 Racing	BMW Z4 GT3	888	(United Kingdom) Lee Mowle	2
(United Kingdom) Triple 888 Racing	BMW Z4 GT3	888	(United Kingdom) Derek Johnston	2
Am Cup
(Belgium) Belgian Audi Club Team WRT	Audi R8 LMS ultra	2	(France) Stéphane Pourquie	3
(Belgium) Belgian Audi Club Team WRT	Audi R8 LMS ultra	2	(France) Harry Teneketzian	3
(Belgium) Belgian Audi Club Team WRT	Audi R8 LMS ultra	2	(France) Grégoire Chaix	3
(Belgium) Belgian Audi Club Team WRT	Audi R8 LMS ultra	4	(France) Jean-Luc Blanchemain	1–3
(Belgium) Belgian Audi Club Team WRT	Audi R8 LMS ultra	4	(Belgium) Christian Kelders	1, 3
(Belgium) Belgian Audi Club Team WRT	Audi R8 LMS ultra	4	(Belgium) Yves Weerts	1–2
(Belgium) Belgian Audi Club Team WRT	Audi R8 LMS ultra	4	(Switzerland) Pierre Hirschi	2–3
(Belgium) Boutsen Ginion	BMW Z4 GT3	15	(Saudi Arabia) Karim Ojjeh	5
(Belgium) Boutsen Ginion	BMW Z4 GT3	15	(Luxembourg) Olivier Grotz	5
(United Kingdom) Team Parker Racing	Audi R8 LMS ultra	22	(United Kingdom) Ian Loggie	All
(United Kingdom) Team Parker Racing	Audi R8 LMS ultra	22	(United Kingdom) Julian Westwood	All
(United Kingdom) Team Parker Racing	Audi R8 LMS ultra	22	(United Kingdom) Chris Jones	1–3
(United Kingdom) Team Parker Racing	Audi R8 LMS ultra	22	(Russia) Leo Machitski	4
(United Kingdom) Team Parker Racing	Audi R8 LMS ultra	22	(Sweden) Carl Rosenblad	4
(France) Saintéloc Racing	Audi R8 LMS ultra	25	(France) Claude-Yves Gosselin	All
(France) Saintéloc Racing	Audi R8 LMS ultra	25	(France) Jean-Claude Lagniez	1–3
(France) Saintéloc Racing	Audi R8 LMS ultra	25	(France) Marc Sourd	1–3
(France) Saintéloc Racing	Audi R8 LMS ultra	25	(France) Marc Rostan	4–5
(France) Saintéloc Racing	Audi R8 LMS ultra	25	(France) Jean-Paul Buffin	4–5
(France) Saintéloc Racing	Audi R8 LMS ultra	25	(France) Philippe Haezebrouck	4
(France) Sport Garage	Ferrari 458 Italia GT3	41	(Belgium) Bernard Delhez	All
(France) Sport Garage	Ferrari 458 Italia GT3	41	(France) George Cabannes	1–4
(France) Sport Garage	Ferrari 458 Italia GT3	41	(France) Romain Brandela	1–2
(France) Sport Garage	Ferrari 458 Italia GT3	41	(France) Sylvain Debs	3
(France) Sport Garage	Ferrari 458 Italia GT3	41	(Belgium) Michael Albert	4–5
(France) Sport Garage	Ferrari 458 Italia GT3	41	(France) Thierry Prignault	4
(France) Sport Garage	Ferrari 458 Italia GT3	41	(France) Bruce Lorgère-Roux	5
(France) Sport Garage	Ferrari 458 Italia GT3	42	(France) Gilles Vannelet	4–5
(France) Sport Garage	Ferrari 458 Italia GT3	42	(Belgium) Martin Van Hove	4
(France) Sport Garage	Ferrari 458 Italia GT3	42	(Italy) Beniamino Caccia	4
(France) Sport Garage	Ferrari 458 Italia GT3	42	(Italy) Lorenzo Bontempelli	4
(France) Sport Garage	Ferrari 458 Italia GT3	42	(France) Michaël Petit	5
(France) Sport Garage	Ferrari 458 Italia GT3	42	(France) Paul Surand	5
(Italy) AF Corse	Ferrari 458 Italia GT3	49	(Italy) Howard Blank	All
(Italy) AF Corse	Ferrari 458 Italia GT3	49	(France) Jean-Marc Bachelier	All
(Italy) AF Corse	Ferrari 458 Italia GT3	49	(France) Yannick Mallegol	All
(Italy) AF Corse	Ferrari 458 Italia GT3	49	(France) François Perrodo	4
(Italy) AF Corse	Ferrari 458 Italia GT3	51	(United Kingdom) Peter Mann	All
(Italy) AF Corse	Ferrari 458 Italia GT3	51	(Portugal) Francisco Guedes	All
(Italy) AF Corse	Ferrari 458 Italia GT3	51	(Portugal) Filipe Barreiros	1–3, 5
(Italy) AF Corse	Ferrari 458 Italia GT3	51	(France) Cédric Mézard	4
(Italy) AF Corse	Ferrari 458 Italia GT3	51	(Belarus) Alexander Talkanitsa	4
(Italy) GDL Motorsport	Mercedes-Benz SLS AMG GT3	67	(Hong Kong) Nigel Fermer	4
(Italy) GDL Motorsport	Mercedes-Benz SLS AMG GT3	67	(Malaysia) Keong Liam Lim	4
(Italy) GDL Motorsport	Mercedes-Benz SLS AMG GT3	67	(Canada) Jean-Charles Perrin	4
(Italy) GDL Motorsport	Mercedes-Benz SLS AMG GT3	67	(Italy) Gianluca de Lorenzi	4
(Italy) Scuderia Villorba Corse	Ferrari 458 Italia GT3	91	(France) Cédric Mézard	3
(Italy) Scuderia Villorba Corse	Ferrari 458 Italia GT3	91	(France) François Perrodo	3
(Switzerland) Kessel Racing	Ferrari 458 Italia GT3	111	(United States) Stephen Earle	All
(Switzerland) Kessel Racing	Ferrari 458 Italia GT3	111	(Germany) Freddy Kremer	All
(Switzerland) Kessel Racing	Ferrari 458 Italia GT3	111	(Switzerland) Daniele Perfetti	1
(Switzerland) Kessel Racing	Ferrari 458 Italia GT3	111	(United Kingdom) Marcus Mahy	2, 4
(Switzerland) Kessel Racing	Ferrari 458 Italia GT3	111	(Italy) Beniamino Caccia	3
(Switzerland) Kessel Racing	Ferrari 458 Italia GT3	111	(Australia) Liam Talbot	4–5
(United Kingdom) Horse Power Racing	Aston Martin V12 Vantage GT3	128	(United Kingdom) Paul Bailey	2
(United Kingdom) Horse Power Racing	Aston Martin V12 Vantage GT3	128	(United Kingdom) Andy Schulz	2
(Belgium) Delahaye Racing	Porsche 997 GT3 R	228	(France) Pierre-Etienne Bordet	4
(Belgium) Delahaye Racing	Porsche 997 GT3 R	228	(France) Alexandre Viron	4
(Belgium) Delahaye Racing	Porsche 997 GT3 R	228	(Belgium) Stéphane Lémeret	4
(Belgium) Delahaye Racing	Porsche 997 GT3 R	228	(Saudi Arabia) Karim Al-Azhari	4
(France) Duqueine Engineering	Ferrari 458 Italia GT3	350	(France) Leonardo Gorini	3–4
(France) Duqueine Engineering	Ferrari 458 Italia GT3	350	(France) Gilles Duqueine	3–4
(France) Duqueine Engineering	Ferrari 458 Italia GT3	350	(France) Paul Lanchère	3–4
(France) Duqueine Engineering	Ferrari 458 Italia GT3	350	(France) Philippe Colançon	4
(France) Duqueine Engineering	Ferrari 458 Italia GT3	380	(France) Phillipe Richard	4
(France) Duqueine Engineering	Ferrari 458 Italia GT3	380	(France) Phillipe Bourgeois	4
(France) Duqueine Engineering	Ferrari 458 Italia GT3	380	(Switzerland) Pierre Hirschi	4
(France) Duqueine Engineering	Ferrari 458 Italia GT3	380	(Belgium) Marlène Broggi	4
(Germany) GT Corse by Rinaldi	Ferrari 458 Italia GT3	458	(Germany) Alexander Mattschull	All
(Germany) GT Corse by Rinaldi	Ferrari 458 Italia GT3	458	(France) Pierre Ehret	1, 3–5
(Germany) GT Corse by Rinaldi	Ferrari 458 Italia GT3	458	(Germany) Frank Schmickler	1–3, 5
(Germany) GT Corse by Rinaldi	Ferrari 458 Italia GT3	458	(Germany) Tim Müller	4
(Germany) GT Corse by Rinaldi	Ferrari 458 Italia GT3	458	(Netherlands) Roger Grouwels	4

== Results and standings ==
=== Race results ===
Rnd.	Circuit	Pole position	PRO winners	PRO-AM winners	AM winners
1	Monza	(France) No. 98 ART Grand Prix	(France) No. 98 ART Grand Prix	(Italy) No. 43 ROAL Motorsport	(Germany) No. 458 GT Corse by Rinaldi
1	Monza	(France) Grégoire Demoustier (Portugal) Álvaro Parente (France) Alexandre Prémat	(France) Grégoire Demoustier (Portugal) Álvaro Parente (France) Alexandre Prémat	(Italy) Stefano Colombo (Italy) Stefano Comandini (Italy) Eugenio Amos	(Germany) Alexander Mattschull (France) Pierre Ehret (Germany) Frank Schmickler
2	Silverstone	(France) No. 93 Pro GT by Alméras	(United Kingdom) No. 7 M-Sport Bentley	(United Kingdom) No. 80 Nissan GT Academy Team RJN	(Germany) No. 458 GT Corse by Rinaldi
2	Silverstone	(France) Eric Dermont (France) Franck Perera	(United Kingdom) Steven Kane (United Kingdom) Guy Smith (United Kingdom) Andy Meyrick	(Germany) Florian Strauss (United States) Nick McMillen (United Kingdom) Alex Buncombe	(Germany) Alexander Mattschull (Germany) Frank Schmickler
3	Paul Ricard	(France) No. 98 ART Grand Prix	(United Kingdom) No. 7 M-Sport Bentley	(France) No. 12 TDS Racing	(Germany) No. 458 GT Corse by Rinaldi
3	Paul Ricard	(France) Grégoire Demoustier (Portugal) Álvaro Parente (France) Nicolas Lapierre	(United Kingdom) Steven Kane (United Kingdom) Guy Smith (United Kingdom) Andy Meyrick	(France) Henry Hassid (Netherlands) Nick Catsburg	(Germany) Alexander Mattschull (France) Pierre Ehret (Germany) Frank Schmickler
4	Spa-Francorchamps	(Belgium) No. 1 Belgian Audi Club Team WRT	(Belgium) No. 1 Belgian Audi Club Team WRT	(Italy) No. 53 AF Corse	(Italy) No. 51 AF Corse
4	Spa-Francorchamps	(Belgium) Laurens Vanthoor (Germany) René Rast (Germany) Markus Winkelhock	(Belgium) Laurens Vanthoor (Germany) René Rast (Germany) Markus Winkelhock	(Belgium) Niek Hommerson (Belgium) Louis Machiels (Italy) Andrea Bertolini (Italy) Marco Cioci	(United Kingdom) Peter Mann (Portugal) Francisco Guedes (France) Cédric Mézard (Belarus) Alexander Talkanitsa
5	Nürburgring	(Belgium) No. 1 Belgian Audi Club Team WRT	(Belgium) No. 1 Belgian Audi Club Team WRT	(France) No. 12 TDS Racing	(United Kingdom) No. 22 Team Parker Racing
5	Nürburgring	(Belgium) Laurens Vanthoor (Brazil) César Ramos (Germany) Christopher Mies	(Belgium) Laurens Vanthoor (Brazil) César Ramos (Germany) Christopher Mies	(France) Henry Hassid (Netherlands) Nick Catsburg	(United Kingdom) Ian Loggie (United Kingdom) Julian Westwood

== Championship Standings ==
Scoring system

Championship points were awarded for the first ten positions in each Championship Race. Entries were required to complete 75% of the winning car's race distance in order to be classified and earn points. Individual drivers were required to participate for a minimum of 25 minutes in order to earn championship points in any race. There were no points awarded for the Pole Position.

Championship Race points

Position	1st	2nd	3rd	4th	5th	6th	7th	8th	9th	10th
Points	25	18	15	12	10	8	6	4	2	1

1000 km Paul Ricard points

Position	1st	2nd	3rd	4th	5th	6th	7th	8th	9th	10th
Points	33	24	19	15	12	9	6	4	2	1

24 Hours of Spa points

Points were awarded after six hours, after twelve hours and at the finish.

Position	1st	2nd	3rd	4th	5th	6th	7th	8th	9th	10th
Points after 6hrs/12hrs	12	9	7	6	5	4	3	2	1	0
Points at the finish	25	18	15	12	10	8	6	4	2	1

=== Drivers' Championships ===
==== Pro Cup ====
Pos.	Driver	Team	MNZ (Italy)	SIL (United Kingdom)	LEC (France)	SPA (Belgium)			NÜR (Germany)	Total
Pos.	Driver	Team	MNZ (Italy)	SIL (United Kingdom)	LEC (France)	6hrs	12hrs	24hrs	NÜR (Germany)	Total
1	(Belgium) Laurens Vanthoor	(Belgium) Belgian Audi Club Team WRT	4	3	13	4	1	1	1	107
2	(United Kingdom) Guy Smith (United Kingdom) Steven Kane (United Kingdom) Andy Meyrick	(United Kingdom) Bentley M-Sport	8	1	1	38	15	13	8	71
3	(Monaco) Stéphane Ortelli (Sweden) Edward Sandström (France) Grégory Guilvert	(France) Sainteloc Racing	2	4	5	2	4	4	34	67
4	(Brazil) César Ramos	(Belgium) Belgian Audi Club Team WRT	4	3	13				1	64
4	(Germany) Maximilian Buhk	(Germany) HTP Motorsport	5		4	6	6	5	2	64
5	(Russia) Sergei Afanasiev (Netherlands) Stef Dusseldorp	(Germany) HTP Motorsport	11	5	3	Ret	Ret	Ret	2	53
6	(Switzerland) Harold Primat (Belgium) Nico Verdonck	(Germany) HTP Motorsport	5	6	4	3	10	9	14	52
7	(Portugal) Álvaro Parente (France) Grégoire Demoustier	(France) ART Grand Prix	1	7	2	21	43	Ret	Ret	49
8	(Spain) Andy Soucek (Estonia) Kevin Korjus (France) Kevin Estre	(France) ART Grand Prix	3	2	Ret	20	Ret	Ret	5	48
9	(Germany) Frank Stippler (United Kingdom) James Nash	(Belgium) Belgian Audi Club Team WRT	Ret	9	7	1	3	3	26	47
10	(Germany) Markus Winkelhock (Germany) René Rast	(Belgium) Belgian Audi Club Team WRT				4	1	1		43

Colour	Result
Gold	Winner
Silver	Second place
Bronze	Third place
Green	Points classification
Blue	Non-points classification
Blue	Non-classified finish (NC)
Purple	Retired, not classified (Ret)
Red	Did not qualify (DNQ)
Red	Did not pre-qualify (DNPQ)
Black	Disqualified (DSQ)
White	Did not start (DNS)
White	Withdrew (WD)
White	Race cancelled (C)
Blank	Did not practice (DNP)
Blank	Did not arrive (DNA)
Blank	Excluded (EX)

=== Teams' Championship ===
==== Pro Cup ====
Pos.	Driver	Team	MNZ (Italy)	SIL (United Kingdom)	LEC (France)	SPA (Belgium)			NÜR (Germany)	Total
Pos.	Driver	Team	CR	CR	CR	6hrs	12hrs	24hrs	CR	Total
1	(Belgium) Belgian Audi Club Team WRT	Audi	4	3	7	1	1	1	1	122
2	(United Kingdom) Bentley M-Sport	Bentley	7	1	1	38	15	13	8	90
3	(Germany) HTP Motorsport	Mercedes-Benz	5	5	3	3	6	5	2	90
4	(France) ART Grand Prix	McLaren	1	2	2	20	43	NC	5	84
5	(France) Saintéloc Racing	Audi	2	4	5	2	4	4	4	80
6	(Germany) Black Falcon	Mercedes-Benz	14	22	9	8	11	11	3	63
7	(United Kingdom) Oman Racing Team	Aston Martin	NC	10	31	31	27	NC	32	24
8	(China) Brothers Racing Team	Audi	22	21	16					16
9	(United Kingdom) Triple Eight Racing	BMW							9	9
10	(Germany) Reiter Engineering	Lamborghini	16							6
10	(Switzerland) Emil Frey Racing	Jaguar							19	6
11	(United Kingdom) Leonard Motorsport AMR	Aston Martin		23						2

== See also ==
- 2014 Blancpain GT Series
- 2014 Blancpain Sprint Series
