= 2014 24 Hours of Spa =

Motorsport event

2014 Total Spa 24 Hours

Seasons
- ← 2013 2015 →

Layout of the Circuit de Spa-Francorchamps

The 2014 Total 24 Hours of Spa was the 67th running of the 24 Hours of Spa. It was also the fourth round of the 2014 Blancpain Endurance Series season and was held on 26 and 27 July at the Circuit de Spa-Francorchamps, Belgium. The race was won by the Belgian Laurens Vanthoor and the German duo of René Rast, and Markus Winkelhock of Belgian Audi Club Team WRT in their Audi R8 LMS ultra.

== Race result ==
- All teams used Pirelli tyres.

Pos	Class	No	Team	Drivers	Chassis	Laps	Qual
Pos	Class	No	Team	Drivers	Engine	Laps	Qual
1	Pro Cup	1	(Belgium) Belgian Audi Club Team WRT	(Belgium) Laurens Vanthoor (Germany) René Rast (Germany) Markus Winkelhock	Audi R8 LMS ultra	527	
1	Pro Cup	1	(Belgium) Belgian Audi Club Team WRT	(Belgium) Laurens Vanthoor (Germany) René Rast (Germany) Markus Winkelhock	Audi 5.2 L V10	527	
2	Pro Cup	77	(Belgium) BMW Sports Trophy Team Marc VDS	(Germany) Lucas Luhr (Finland) Markus Palttala (Germany) Dirk Werner	BMW Z4 GT3	527	
2	Pro Cup	77	(Belgium) BMW Sports Trophy Team Marc VDS	(Germany) Lucas Luhr (Finland) Markus Palttala (Germany) Dirk Werner	BMW 4.4 L V8	527	
3	Pro Cup	3	(Belgium) Belgian Audi Club Team WRT	(Germany) Frank Stippler (Germany) Christopher Mies (United Kingdom) James Nash	Audi R8 LMS ultra	526	
3	Pro Cup	3	(Belgium) Belgian Audi Club Team WRT	(Germany) Frank Stippler (Germany) Christopher Mies (United Kingdom) James Nash	Audi 5.2 L V10	526	
4	Pro Cup	26	(France) Saintéloc Racing	(Monaco) Stéphane Ortelli (France) Grégory Guilvert (Sweden) Edward Sandström	Audi R8 LMS ultra	525	
4	Pro Cup	26	(France) Saintéloc Racing	(Monaco) Stéphane Ortelli (France) Grégory Guilvert (Sweden) Edward Sandström	Audi 5.2 L V10	525	
5	Pro Cup	86	(Germany) HTP Motorsport	(Germany) Maximilian Buhk (Germany) Maximilian Götz (Malaysia) Jazeman Jaafar	Mercedes-Benz SLS AMG GT3	523	
5	Pro Cup	86	(Germany) HTP Motorsport	(Germany) Maximilian Buhk (Germany) Maximilian Götz (Malaysia) Jazeman Jaafar	Mercedes-Benz 6.2 L V8	523	
6	Pro-Am Cup	53	(Italy) AF Corse	(Belgium) Niek Hommerson (Belgium) Louis Machiels (Italy) Marco Cioci (Italy) Andrea Bertolini	Ferrari 458 Italia GT3	520	
6	Pro-Am Cup	53	(Italy) AF Corse	(Belgium) Niek Hommerson (Belgium) Louis Machiels (Italy) Marco Cioci (Italy) Andrea Bertolini	Ferrari 4.5 L V8	520	
7	Pro-Am Cup	79	(United Kingdom) Ecurie Ecosse	(United Kingdom) Oliver Bryant (United Kingdom) Andrew Smith (United Kingdom) Alasdair McCaig (United Kingdom) Alexander Sims	BMW Z4 GT3	520	
7	Pro-Am Cup	79	(United Kingdom) Ecurie Ecosse	(United Kingdom) Oliver Bryant (United Kingdom) Andrew Smith (United Kingdom) Alasdair McCaig (United Kingdom) Alexander Sims	BMW 4.4 L V8	520	
8	Pro-Am Cup	52	(Italy) AF Corse	(Australia) Steve Wyatt (Australia) Craig Lowndes (Italy) Michele Rugolo (Italy) Andrea Piccini	Ferrari 458 Italia GT3	519	
8	Pro-Am Cup	52	(Italy) AF Corse	(Australia) Steve Wyatt (Australia) Craig Lowndes (Italy) Michele Rugolo (Italy) Andrea Piccini	Ferrari 4.5 L V8	519	
9	Pro Cup	84	(Germany) HTP Motorsport	(Switzerland) Harold Primat (Belgium) Nico Verdonck (Germany) Bernd Schneider	Mercedes-Benz SLS AMG GT3	518	
9	Pro Cup	84	(Germany) HTP Motorsport	(Switzerland) Harold Primat (Belgium) Nico Verdonck (Germany) Bernd Schneider	Mercedes-Benz 6.2 L V8	518	
10	Pro-Am Cup	38	(United Kingdom) MP Motorsport AMR	(United Kingdom) Richard Abra (United Kingdom) Mark Poole (United Kingdom) Joe Osborne (United Kingdom) Darren Turner	Aston Martin V12 Vantage GT3	517	
10	Pro-Am Cup	38	(United Kingdom) MP Motorsport AMR	(United Kingdom) Richard Abra (United Kingdom) Mark Poole (United Kingdom) Joe Osborne (United Kingdom) Darren Turner	Aston Martin 6.0 L V12	517	
11	Pro Cup	63	(Germany) Black Falcon	(France) Mike Parisy (United Kingdom) Adam Christodoulou (Netherlands) Yelmer Buurman	Mercedes-Benz SLS AMG GT3	517	
11	Pro Cup	63	(Germany) Black Falcon	(France) Mike Parisy (United Kingdom) Adam Christodoulou (Netherlands) Yelmer Buurman	Mercedes-Benz 6.2 L V8	517	
12	Pro Cup	2	(Belgium) Belgian Audi Club Team WRT	(Germany) André Lotterer (Switzerland) Marcel Fässler (France) Benoît Tréluyer	Audi R8 LMS ultra	516	
12	Pro Cup	2	(Belgium) Belgian Audi Club Team WRT	(Germany) André Lotterer (Switzerland) Marcel Fässler (France) Benoît Tréluyer	Audi 5.2 L V10	516	
13	Pro Cup	7	(United Kingdom) M-Sport Bentley	(United Kingdom) Steven Kane (United Kingdom) Guy Smith (United Kingdom) Andy Meyrick	Bentley Continental GT3	516	
13	Pro Cup	7	(United Kingdom) M-Sport Bentley	(United Kingdom) Steven Kane (United Kingdom) Guy Smith (United Kingdom) Andy Meyrick	Volkswagen 6.0 L V8	516	
14	Pro Cup	75	(Czech Republic) ISR Racing	(Czech Republic) Filip Salaquarda (Germany) Fabian Hamprecht (Germany) Marc Basseng	Audi R8 LMS ultra	514	
14	Pro Cup	75	(Czech Republic) ISR Racing	(Czech Republic) Filip Salaquarda (Germany) Fabian Hamprecht (Germany) Marc Basseng	Audi 5.2 L V10	514	
15	Pro-Am Cup	90	(Italy) Scuderia Villorba Corse	(Italy) Andrea Rizzoli (Monaco) Francesco Castellacci (Italy) Stefano Gai (Italy) Andrea Montermini	Ferrari 458 Italia GT3	514	
15	Pro-Am Cup	90	(Italy) Scuderia Villorba Corse	(Italy) Andrea Rizzoli (Monaco) Francesco Castellacci (Italy) Stefano Gai (Italy) Andrea Montermini	Ferrari 4.5 L V8	514	
16	Pro–Am Cup	10	(France) TDS Racing	(France) Eric Clément (France) Benjamin Lariche (France) Nicolas Armindo (France) Olivier Pla	BMW Z4 GT3	513	
16	Pro–Am Cup	10	(France) TDS Racing	(France) Eric Clément (France) Benjamin Lariche (France) Nicolas Armindo (France) Olivier Pla	BMW 4.4 L V8	513	
17	Pro Cup	8	(United Kingdom) M-Sport Bentley	(Belgium) Jérôme d'Ambrosio (United Kingdom) Duncan Tappy (France) Antoine Leclerc	Bentley Continental GT3	512	
17	Pro Cup	8	(United Kingdom) M-Sport Bentley	(Belgium) Jérôme d'Ambrosio (United Kingdom) Duncan Tappy (France) Antoine Leclerc	Volkswagen 6.0 L V8	512	
18	Pro-Am Cup	93	(France) Pro GT by Alméras	(France) Eric Dermont (France) Franck Perera (Italy) Marco Bonanomi (France) Lucas Lasserre	Porsche 997 GT3 R	510	
18	Pro-Am Cup	93	(France) Pro GT by Alméras	(France) Eric Dermont (France) Franck Perera (Italy) Marco Bonanomi (France) Lucas Lasserre	Porsche 4.0 L Flat-6	510	
19	Pro-Am Cup	120	(France) SOFREV Auto Sport Promotion	(France) Christophe Bourret (France) Pascal Gibon (France) Jean-Philippe Belloc (France) Julien Canal	Ferrari 458 Italia GT3	509	
19	Pro-Am Cup	120	(France) SOFREV Auto Sport Promotion	(France) Christophe Bourret (France) Pascal Gibon (France) Jean-Philippe Belloc (France) Julien Canal	Ferrari 4.5 L V8	509	
20	Pro-Am Cup	4	(Belgium) Belgian Audi Club Team WRT	(France) Jean-Luc Blanchemain (Germany) Christian Kelders (Germany) Fred Bouvy (Germany) Vincent Radermecker	Audi R8 LMS ultra	506	
20	Pro-Am Cup	4	(Belgium) Belgian Audi Club Team WRT	(France) Jean-Luc Blanchemain (Germany) Christian Kelders (Germany) Fred Bouvy (Germany) Vincent Radermecker	Audi 5.2 L V10	506	
21	Pro-Am Cup	54	(Italy) AF Corse	(United Kingdom) Duncan Cameron (United Kingdom) Alex Mortimer (Republic of Ireland) Matt Griffin	Ferrari 458 Italia GT3	504	
21	Pro-Am Cup	54	(Italy) AF Corse	(United Kingdom) Duncan Cameron (United Kingdom) Alex Mortimer (Republic of Ireland) Matt Griffin	Ferrari 4.5 L V8	504	
22	Pro-Am Cup	116	(France) SOFREV Auto Sport Promotion	(France) Fabien Barthez (France) Eric Debard (France) Ludovic Badey (France) Tristan Vautier	Ferrari 458 Italia GT3	503	
22	Pro-Am Cup	116	(France) SOFREV Auto Sport Promotion	(France) Fabien Barthez (France) Eric Debard (France) Ludovic Badey (France) Tristan Vautier	Ferrari 4.5 L V8	503	
23	Pro-Am Cup	17	(Denmark) Insightracing with Flex-Box	(Denmark) Dennis Andersen (Denmark) Martin Jensen (United States) Jason Yeomans	Ferrari 458 Italia GT3	502	
23	Pro-Am Cup	17	(Denmark) Insightracing with Flex-Box	(Denmark) Dennis Andersen (Denmark) Martin Jensen (United States) Jason Yeomans	Ferrari 4.5 L V8	502	
24	Gentleman; Trophy	51	(Italy) AF Corse	(United Kingdom) Peter Mann (Portugal) Francisco Guedes (France) Cédric Mézard (Belarus) Alexander Talkanitsa	Ferrari 458 Italia GT3	502	
24	Gentleman; Trophy	51	(Italy) AF Corse	(United Kingdom) Peter Mann (Portugal) Francisco Guedes (France) Cédric Mézard (Belarus) Alexander Talkanitsa	Ferrari 4.5 L V8	502	
25	Pro-Am Cup	80	(United Kingdom) Nissan GT Academy Team RJN	(Germany) Florian Strauss (United States) Nick McMillen (United Kingdom) Alex Buncombe (Belgium) Wolfgang Reip	Nissan GT-R Nismo GT3	501	
25	Pro-Am Cup	80	(United Kingdom) Nissan GT Academy Team RJN	(Germany) Florian Strauss (United States) Nick McMillen (United Kingdom) Alex Buncombe (Belgium) Wolfgang Reip	Nissan 3.8 L Turbo V6	501	
26	Pro-Am Cup	188	(Switzerland) Fach Auto Tech	(Germany) Otto Klohs (Germany) Swen Dolenc (Switzerland) Philipp Frommenwiler (Austria) Martin Ragginger	Porsche 997 GT3 R	499	
26	Pro-Am Cup	188	(Switzerland) Fach Auto Tech	(Germany) Otto Klohs (Germany) Swen Dolenc (Switzerland) Philipp Frommenwiler (Austria) Martin Ragginger	Porsche 4.0 L Flat-6	499	
27	Pro-Am Cup	11	(Switzerland) Kessel Racing	(Poland) Michał Broniszewski (Italy) Alessandro Bonacini (Italy) Marco Frezza (Italy) Giacomo Piccini	Ferrari 458 Italia GT3	498	
27	Pro-Am Cup	11	(Switzerland) Kessel Racing	(Poland) Michał Broniszewski (Italy) Alessandro Bonacini (Italy) Marco Frezza (Italy) Giacomo Piccini	Ferrari 4.5 L V8	498	
28	Gentleman; Trophy	22	(United Kingdom) Team Parker Racing	(United Kingdom) Ian Loggie (United Kingdom) Julian Westwood (Russia) Leo Machitski (Sweden) Carl Rosenblad	Audi R8 LMS ultra	497	
28	Gentleman; Trophy	22	(United Kingdom) Team Parker Racing	(United Kingdom) Ian Loggie (United Kingdom) Julian Westwood (Russia) Leo Machitski (Sweden) Carl Rosenblad	Audi 5.2 L V10	497	
29	Gentleman; Trophy	49	(Italy) AF Corse	(Italy) Howard Blank (France) Jean-Marc Bachelier (France) Yannick Mallegol (France) François Perrodo	Ferrari 458 Italia GT3	497	
29	Gentleman; Trophy	49	(Italy) AF Corse	(Italy) Howard Blank (France) Jean-Marc Bachelier (France) Yannick Mallegol (France) François Perrodo	Ferrari 4.5 L V8	497	
30	Gentleman; Trophy	350	(France) Duqueine Engineering	(France) Leonardo Gorini (France) Gilles Duqueine (France) Paul Lanchere (France) Philippe Colançon	Ferrari 458 Italia GT3	493	
30	Gentleman; Trophy	350	(France) Duqueine Engineering	(France) Leonardo Gorini (France) Gilles Duqueine (France) Paul Lanchere (France) Philippe Colançon	Ferrari 4.5 L V8	493	
31	Gentleman; Trophy	67	(Italy) GDL Motorsport	(Hong Kong) Nigel Fermer (Malaysia) Keong Liam Lim (Canada) Jean-Charles Perrin (Italy) Gianluca de Lorenzi	Mercedes-Benz SLS AMG GT3	492	
31	Gentleman; Trophy	67	(Italy) GDL Motorsport	(Hong Kong) Nigel Fermer (Malaysia) Keong Liam Lim (Canada) Jean-Charles Perrin (Italy) Gianluca de Lorenzi	Mercedes-Benz 6.2 L V8	492	
32	Gentleman; Trophy	42	(France) Sport Garage	(France) Gilles Vannelet (Belgium) Martin Van Hove (Italy) Beniamino Caccia (Italy) Lorenzo Bontempelli	Ferrari 458 Italia GT3	491	
32	Gentleman; Trophy	42	(France) Sport Garage	(France) Gilles Vannelet (Belgium) Martin Van Hove (Italy) Beniamino Caccia (Italy) Lorenzo Bontempelli	Ferrari 4.5 L V8	491	
33	Gentleman; Trophy	228	(France) Delahaye Racing	(France) Pierre-Etienne Bordet (France) Alexandre Viron (Belgium) Stéphane Lémeret (Saudi Arabia) Karim Al-Azhari	Porsche 997 GT3 R	490	
33	Gentleman; Trophy	228	(France) Delahaye Racing	(France) Pierre-Etienne Bordet (France) Alexandre Viron (Belgium) Stéphane Lémeret (Saudi Arabia) Karim Al-Azhari	Porsche 4.0 L Flat-6	490	
34	Pro-Am Cup	18	(Germany) Black Falcon	(Netherlands) Vladimir Lunkin (Austria) Richard Muscat (Saudi Arabia) Saud Turki Al Faisal (Germany) Christian Bracke	Mercedes-Benz SLS AMG GT3	489	
34	Pro-Am Cup	18	(Germany) Black Falcon	(Netherlands) Vladimir Lunkin (Austria) Richard Muscat (Saudi Arabia) Saud Turki Al Faisal (Germany) Christian Bracke	Mercedes-Benz 6.2 L V8	489	
35	Pro-Am Cup	43	(Italy) ROAL Motorsport	(Italy) Stefano Comandini (Italy) Eugenio Amos (Italy) Stefano Colombo (Italy) Michela Cerruti	BMW Z4 GT3	486	
35	Pro-Am Cup	43	(Italy) ROAL Motorsport	(Italy) Stefano Comandini (Italy) Eugenio Amos (Italy) Stefano Colombo (Italy) Michela Cerruti	BMW 4.4 L V8	486	
36	Gentleman; Trophy	41	(France) Sport Garage	(Belgium) Bernard Delhez (France) George Cabannes (Belgium) Michael Albert (France) Thierry Prignault	Ferrari 458 Italia GT3	484	
36	Gentleman; Trophy	41	(France) Sport Garage	(Belgium) Bernard Delhez (France) George Cabannes (Belgium) Michael Albert (France) Thierry Prignault	Ferrari 4.5 L V8	484	
37	Pro-Am Cup	32	(United Kingdom) Leonard Motorsport AMR	(United Kingdom) Stuart Leonard (United Kingdom) Paul Wilson (United Kingdom) Michael Meadows (Portugal) Pedro Lamy	Aston Martin V12 Vantage GT3	475	
37	Pro-Am Cup	32	(United Kingdom) Leonard Motorsport AMR	(United Kingdom) Stuart Leonard (United Kingdom) Paul Wilson (United Kingdom) Michael Meadows (Portugal) Pedro Lamy	Aston Martin 6.0 L V12	475	
38	Pro-Am Cup	35	(United Kingdom) Nissan GT Academy Team RJN	(Portugal) Miguel Faísca (Japan) Katsumasa Chiyo (Japan) Masataka Yanagida (Russia) Mark Shulzhitskiy	Nissan GT-R Nismo GT3	462	
38	Pro-Am Cup	35	(United Kingdom) Nissan GT Academy Team RJN	(Portugal) Miguel Faísca (Japan) Katsumasa Chiyo (Japan) Masataka Yanagida (Russia) Mark Shulzhitskiy	Nissan 3.8 L Turbo V6	462	
39	Gentleman; Trophy	380	(France) Duqueine Engineering	(France) Phillipe Richard (France) Phillipe Bourgeois (Switzerland) Pierre Hirschi (Belgium) Marlène Broggi	Ferrari 458 Italia GT3	456	
39	Gentleman; Trophy	380	(France) Duqueine Engineering	(France) Phillipe Richard (France) Phillipe Bourgeois (Switzerland) Pierre Hirschi (Belgium) Marlène Broggi	Ferrari 4.5 L V8	456	
40	Pro-Am Cup	16	(Belgium) Boutsen Ginion	(Lebanon) Shahan Sarkissian (Lebanon) Alex Demirdjian (New Zealand) Chris van der Drift (Belgium) Michael Schmetz	McLaren MP4-12C GT3	438	
40	Pro-Am Cup	16	(Belgium) Boutsen Ginion	(Lebanon) Shahan Sarkissian (Lebanon) Alex Demirdjian (New Zealand) Chris van der Drift (Belgium) Michael Schmetz	McLaren 3.8 L Turbo V8	438	
DNF	Gentleman; Trophy	25	(France) Saintéloc Racing	(France) Claude-Yves Gosselin (France) Marc Rostan (France) Jean-Paul Buffin (France) Philippe Haezebrouck	Audi R8 LMS ultra	323	
DNF	Gentleman; Trophy	25	(France) Saintéloc Racing	(France) Claude-Yves Gosselin (France) Marc Rostan (France) Jean-Paul Buffin (France) Philippe Haezebrouck	Audi 5.2 L V10	323	
DNF	Pro-Am Cup	96	(United Kingdom) PGF-Kinfaun AMR	(United Kingdom) John Gaw (United Kingdom) Phil Dryburgh (United Kingdom) Paul White (United Kingdom) Tom Onslow-Cole	Aston Martin V12 Vantage GT3	307	
DNF	Pro-Am Cup	96	(United Kingdom) PGF-Kinfaun AMR	(United Kingdom) John Gaw (United Kingdom) Phil Dryburgh (United Kingdom) Paul White (United Kingdom) Tom Onslow-Cole	Aston Martin 6.0 L V12	307	
DNF	Pro-Am Cup	12	(France) TDS Racing	(France) Henry Hassid (France) Pierre Thiriet (Netherlands) Nick Catsburg (Germany) Jens Klingmann	BMW Z4 GT3	303	
DNF	Pro-Am Cup	12	(France) TDS Racing	(France) Henry Hassid (France) Pierre Thiriet (Netherlands) Nick Catsburg (Germany) Jens Klingmann	BMW 4.4 L V8	303	
DNF	Pro Cup	19	(Germany) Black Falcon	(Saudi Arabia) Abdulaziz Al Faisal (Germany) Hubert Haupt (Sweden) Andreas Simonsen	Mercedes-Benz SLS AMG GT3	285	
DNF	Pro Cup	19	(Germany) Black Falcon	(Saudi Arabia) Abdulaziz Al Faisal (Germany) Hubert Haupt (Sweden) Andreas Simonsen	Mercedes-Benz 6.2 L V8	285	
DNF	Pro-Am Cup	23	(Australia) Lago Racing	(Australia) Roger Lago (Australia) David Russell (New Zealand) Steven Richards (Australia) Steve Owen	Lamborghini Gallardo LP600+ GT3	255	
DNF	Pro-Am Cup	23	(Australia) Lago Racing	(Australia) Roger Lago (Australia) David Russell (New Zealand) Steven Richards (Australia) Steve Owen	Lamborghini 5.2 L V10	255	
DNF	Pro-Am Cup	14	(Switzerland) Emil Frey Racing	(Switzerland) Fredy Barth (Switzerland) Lorenz Frey (Switzerland) Gabriele Gardel (Switzerland) Jonathan Hirschi	Emil Frey G3 Jaguar XK	232	
DNF	Pro-Am Cup	14	(Switzerland) Emil Frey Racing	(Switzerland) Fredy Barth (Switzerland) Lorenz Frey (Switzerland) Gabriele Gardel (Switzerland) Jonathan Hirschi	Ilmor-prepared Jaguar AJ133 5.0L V8	232	
DNF	Pro Cup	44	Oman Racing Team	(Oman) Ahmad Al Harthy (United Kingdom) Michael Caine (United Kingdom) Stephen Jelley	Aston Martin V12 Vantage GT3	225	
DNF	Pro Cup	44	Oman Racing Team	(Oman) Ahmad Al Harthy (United Kingdom) Michael Caine (United Kingdom) Stephen Jelley	Aston Martin 6.0 L V12	225	
DNF	Pro Cup	98	(France) ART Grand Prix	(France) Grégoire Demoustier (France) Nicolas Lapierre (Portugal) Álvaro Parente	McLaren MP4-12C GT3	214	
DNF	Pro Cup	98	(France) ART Grand Prix	(France) Grégoire Demoustier (France) Nicolas Lapierre (Portugal) Álvaro Parente	McLaren 3.8 L Turbo V8	214	
DNF	Pro-Am Cup	82	(Russia) GT Russian Team	(Russia) Aleksey Vasilyev (Estonia) Marko Asmer (Lithuania) Kazim Vasiliauskas (Germany) Florian Spengler	McLaren MP4-12C GT3	181	
DNF	Pro-Am Cup	82	(Russia) GT Russian Team	(Russia) Aleksey Vasilyev (Estonia) Marko Asmer (Lithuania) Kazim Vasiliauskas (Germany) Florian Spengler	McLaren 3.8 L Turbo V8	181	
DNF	Pro Cup	66	(Belgium) BMW Sports Trophy Team Marc VDS	(Belgium) Maxime Martin (Germany) Jörg Müller (Brazil) Augusto Farfus	BMW Z4 GT3	153	
DNF	Pro Cup	66	(Belgium) BMW Sports Trophy Team Marc VDS	(Belgium) Maxime Martin (Germany) Jörg Müller (Brazil) Augusto Farfus	BMW 4.4 L V8	153	
DNF	Pro Cup	99	(France) ART Grand Prix	(Spain) Andy Soucek (Estonia) Kevin Korjus (France) Kévin Estre	McLaren MP4-12C GT3	136	
DNF	Pro Cup	99	(France) ART Grand Prix	(Spain) Andy Soucek (Estonia) Kevin Korjus (France) Kévin Estre	McLaren 3.8 L Turbo V8	136	
DNF	Pro-Am Cup	333	(Germany) GT Corse by Rinaldi	(Germany) Marco Seefried (Russia) Vadim Kogay (Russia) Rinat Salikhov (Austria) Norbert Siedler	Ferrari 458 Italia GT3	87	
DNF	Pro-Am Cup	333	(Germany) GT Corse by Rinaldi	(Germany) Marco Seefried (Russia) Vadim Kogay (Russia) Rinat Salikhov (Austria) Norbert Siedler	Ferrari 4.5 L V8	87	
DNF	Gentleman; Trophy	111	(Switzerland) Kessel Racing	(United States) Stephen Earle (Germany) Freddy Kremer (United Kingdom) Marcus Mahy (Australia) Liam Talbot	Ferrari 458 Italia GT3	75	
DNF	Gentleman; Trophy	111	(Switzerland) Kessel Racing	(United States) Stephen Earle (Germany) Freddy Kremer (United Kingdom) Marcus Mahy (Australia) Liam Talbot	Ferrari 4.5 L V8	75	
DNF	Pro Cup	85	(Germany) HTP Motorsport	(Russia) Sergey Afanasyev (Netherlands) Stef Dusseldorp (Netherlands) Xavier Maassen	Mercedes-Benz SLS AMG GT3	52	
DNF	Pro Cup	85	(Germany) HTP Motorsport	(Russia) Sergey Afanasyev (Netherlands) Stef Dusseldorp (Netherlands) Xavier Maassen	Mercedes-Benz 6.2 L V8	52	
DNF	Pro-Am Cup	50	(Italy) AF Corse	(Canada) Andrew Danyliw (Netherlands) Simon Knap (Italy) Andrea Sonvico (Italy) Alessandro Pier Guidi	Ferrari 458 Italia GT3	51	
DNF	Pro-Am Cup	50	(Italy) AF Corse	(Canada) Andrew Danyliw (Netherlands) Simon Knap (Italy) Andrea Sonvico (Italy) Alessandro Pier Guidi	Ferrari 4.5 L V8	51	
DNF	Pro-Am Cup	107	(United Kingdom) Beechdean AMR	(United Kingdom) Andrew Howard (United Kingdom) Daniel Lloyd (United Kingdom) Jonathan Adam (Germany) Stefan Mücke	Aston Martin V12 Vantage GT3	51	
DNF	Pro-Am Cup	107	(United Kingdom) Beechdean AMR	(United Kingdom) Andrew Howard (United Kingdom) Daniel Lloyd (United Kingdom) Jonathan Adam (Germany) Stefan Mücke	Aston Martin 6.0 L V12	51	
DNF	Gentleman; Trophy	458	(Germany) GT Corse by Rinaldi	(Germany) Alexander Mattschull (France) Pierre Ehret (Germany) Tim Müller (Netherlands) Roger Grouwels	Ferrari 458 Italia GT3	48	
DNF	Gentleman; Trophy	458	(Germany) GT Corse by Rinaldi	(Germany) Alexander Mattschull (France) Pierre Ehret (Germany) Tim Müller (Netherlands) Roger Grouwels	Ferrari 4.5 L V8	48	
DNF	Pro-Am Cup	15	(Belgium) Boutsen Ginion	(Saudi Arabia) Karim Ojjeh (Luxembourg) Olivier Grotz (Belgium) Frédéric Vervisch (Italy) Giorgio Pantano	McLaren MP4-12C GT3	46	
DNF	Pro-Am Cup	15	(Belgium) Boutsen Ginion	(Saudi Arabia) Karim Ojjeh (Luxembourg) Olivier Grotz (Belgium) Frédéric Vervisch (Italy) Giorgio Pantano	McLaren 3.8 L Turbo V8	46	
DNF	Pro Cup	101	(New Zealand) Von Ryan Racing	(New Zealand) Shane van Gisbergen (United Kingdom) Rob Bell (United Kingdom) Tim Mullen	McLaren MP4-12C GT3	40	
DNF	Pro Cup	101	(New Zealand) Von Ryan Racing	(New Zealand) Shane van Gisbergen (United Kingdom) Rob Bell (United Kingdom) Tim Mullen	McLaren 3.8 L Turbo V8	40	
DNF	Pro-Am Cup	100	(Russia) SMP Racing Russian Bears	(Russia) Viacheslav Maleev (Russia) Roman Mavlanov (Spain) José Manuel Pérez-Aicart (Italy) Daniel Zampieri	Ferrari 458 Italia GT3	37	
DNF	Pro-Am Cup	100	(Russia) SMP Racing Russian Bears	(Russia) Viacheslav Maleev (Russia) Roman Mavlanov (Spain) José Manuel Pérez-Aicart (Italy) Daniel Zampieri	Ferrari 4.5 L V8	37	
DNF	Pro-Am Cup	150	(Germany) Wochenspiegel Team Manthey	(Germany) Georg Weiss (Germany) Oliver Kainz (Germany) Jochen Krumbach (Germany) Christian Menzel	Porsche 997 GT3 R	13	
DNF	Pro-Am Cup	150	(Germany) Wochenspiegel Team Manthey	(Germany) Georg Weiss (Germany) Oliver Kainz (Germany) Jochen Krumbach (Germany) Christian Menzel	Porsche 4.0 L Flat-6	13	

== Support races ==
Lamborghini Super Trofeo, Cooper Tires British Formula Three Championship, Formula Renault 2.0 Northern European Cup and Belgian Racing Car Championship + GT4 European Series.
