= 2013 Porsche Carrera Cup Great Britain =

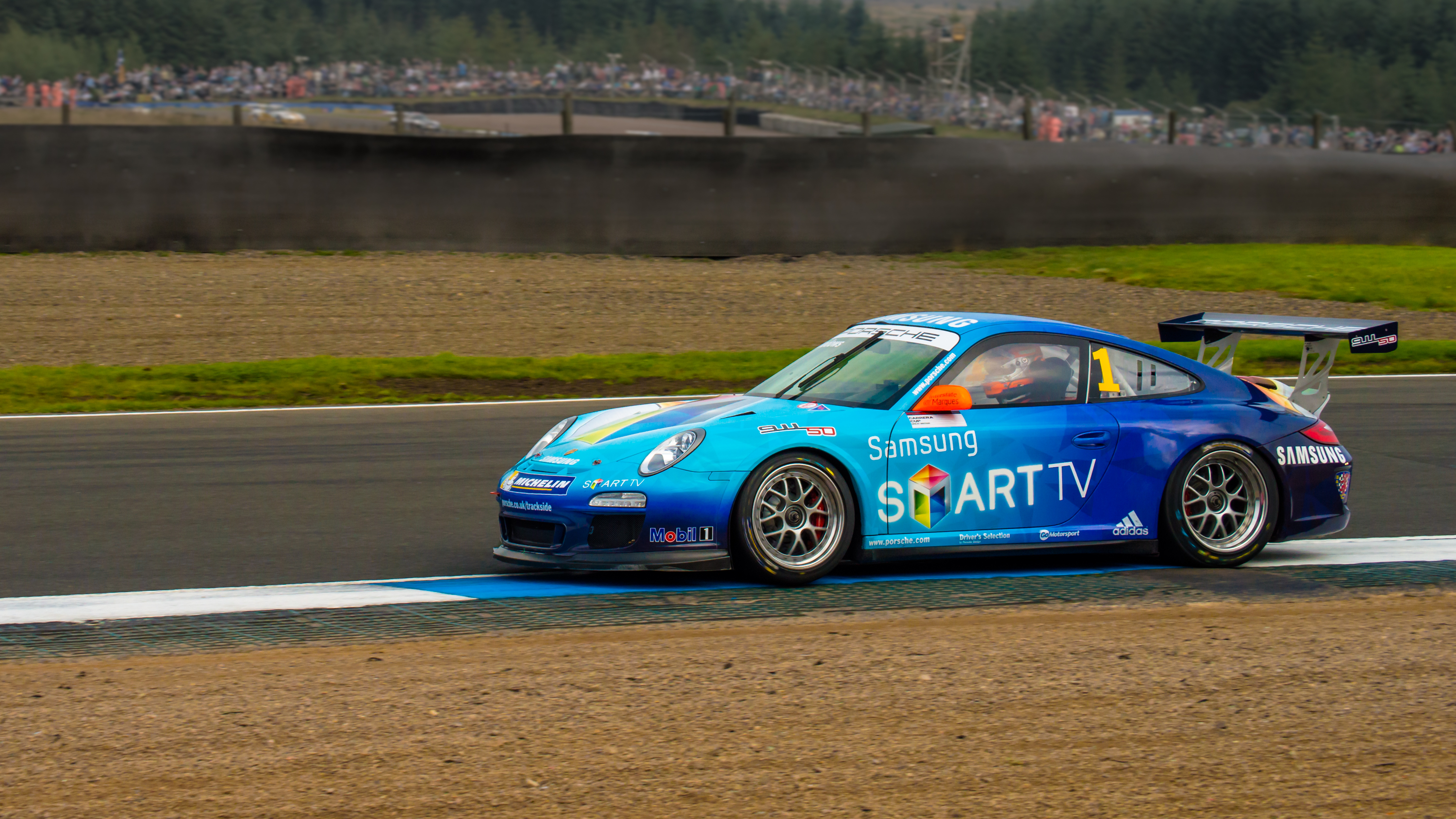
Champion Michael Meadows driving for Samsung Smart Motorsport at Knockhill.

The 2013 Porsche Carrera Cup Great Britain was a multi-event, one make motor racing championship held across England and Scotland. The championship featured a mix of professional motor racing teams and privately funded drivers, competing in Porsche 911 GT3 cars that conform to the technical regulations for the championship. It is a multi class championship, with drivers grouped based on their ability and experience into three classes: Professional, Professional-Amateur 1 (Pro-Am 1) and Professional-Amateur 2 (Pro-Am 2). It forms part of the extensive program of support categories built up around the BTCC centrepiece.

This season was the eleventh Porsche Carrera Cup Great Britain. The season commenced on 31 March at Brands Hatch – on the circuit's Indy configuration – and concluded on 13 October at the same venue, utilising the Grand Prix circuit, after twenty races held at ten meetings, all in support of the 2013 British Touring Car Championship.

== Entry list ==
Team	No.	Driver	Rounds
Samsung Smart Motorsport	1	(United Kingdom) Michael Meadows	All
Samsung Smart Motorsport	11	(United Kingdom) Richard Kent	1–3
Samsung Smart Motorsport	24	(United Kingdom) James Birch	4–10
Redline Racing	7	(United Kingdom) Dean Stoneman	1–7, 9–10
Redline Racing	19	(United Kingdom) Dan De Zille	1
Juta Racing	8	(Lithuania) Jonas Gelžinis	All
Team Parker Racing	23	(United Kingdom) Daniel Lloyd	All
Celtic Speed	45	(United Kingdom) Rory Butcher	All
Pro-Am 1
Celtic Speed	4	(United Kingdom) Steven Brewster	9
Celtic Speed	44	(United Kingdom) George Brewster	1–2, 5–7, 10
Redline Racing	10	(South Africa) Kyle Barnes	1
Redline Racing	19	(United Kingdom) Dan De Zille	2–10
Redline Racing	25	(Spain) Víctor Jiménez	All
Redline Racing	29	(Turkey) Yücel Özbek	1, 3
Redline Racing	99	(United Kingdom) Keith Webster	6
Team Parker Racing	17	(Republic of Ireland) Michael Leonard	2
Team Parker Racing	22	(United Kingdom) Justin Sherwood	10
Team Parker Racing	36	(Republic of Ireland) Karl Leonard	2, 4
Pro-Am 2
Redline Racing	12	(United Kingdom) George Wright	5
IN2 Racing; Goff Racing	59	(United Kingdom) Will Goff	2, 6
Parr Motorsport	95	(United Kingdom) Pete Smallwood	1–2, 4, 9

== Race calendar and results ==
On 29 August 2012, the British Touring Car Championship announced the race calendar for the 2013 season, for all of the series competing on the TOCA package.

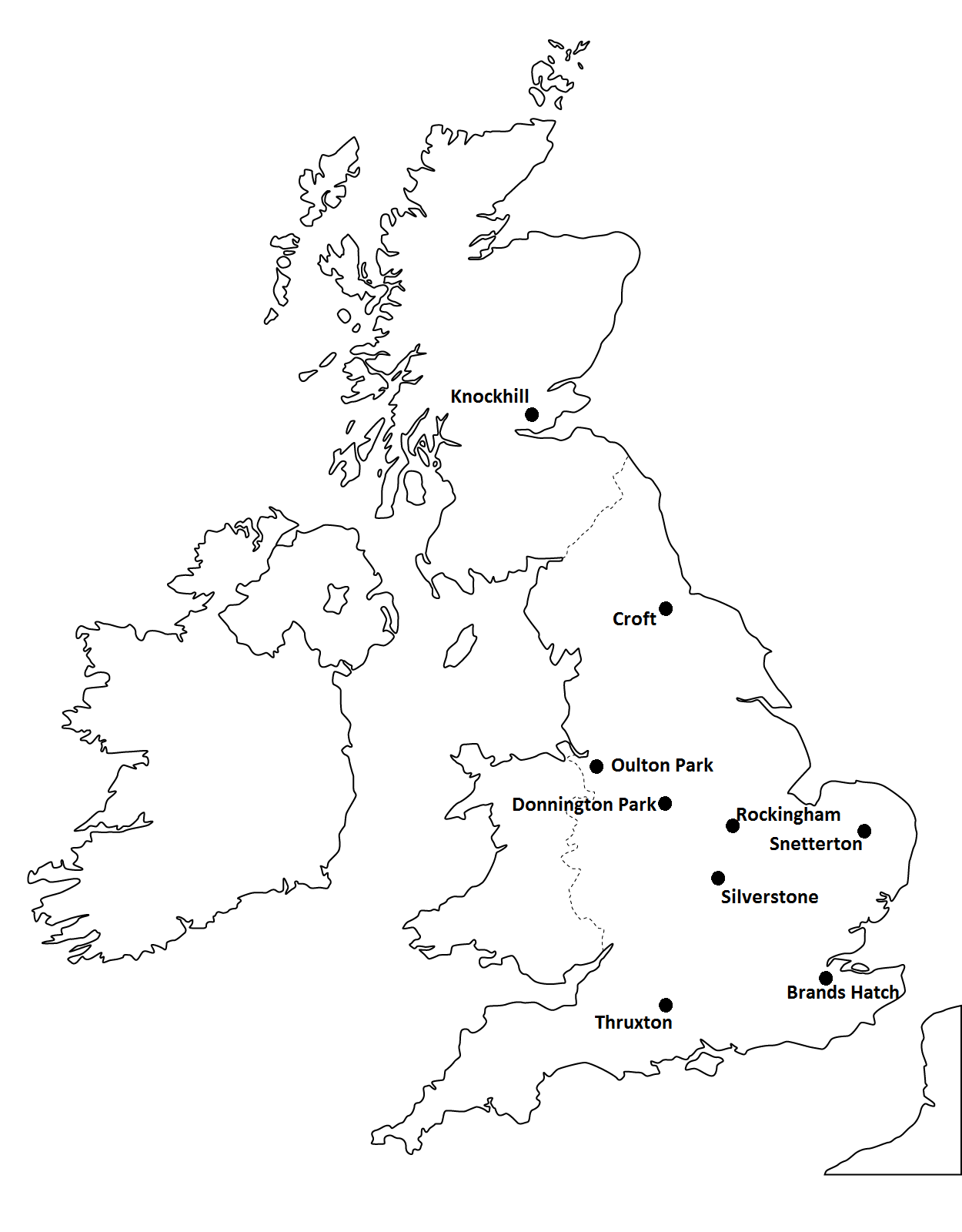
Circuits for the 2013 season

Round		Circuit	Date	Pole position	Fastest lap	Winning driver	Winning team
1	R1	Brands Hatch (Indy Circuit, Kent)	31 March	(United Kingdom) Dean Stoneman	(United Kingdom) Michael Meadows	(United Kingdom) Dean Stoneman	Redline Racing
1	R2	Brands Hatch (Indy Circuit, Kent)	31 March	(United Kingdom) Michael Meadows	(United Kingdom) Michael Meadows	(United Kingdom) Dean Stoneman	Redline Racing
2	R3	Donington Park (National Circuit, Leicestershire)	21 April	(United Kingdom) Dean Stoneman	(Lithuania) Jonas Gelžinis	(United Kingdom) Michael Meadows	Samsung Smart Motorsport
2	R4	Donington Park (National Circuit, Leicestershire)	21 April	(United Kingdom) Michael Meadows	(United Kingdom) Dean Stoneman	(United Kingdom) Michael Meadows	Samsung Smart Motorsport
3	R5	Thruxton Circuit (Hampshire)	5 May	(United Kingdom) Michael Meadows	(United Kingdom) Rory Butcher	(United Kingdom) Daniel Lloyd	Team Parker Racing
3	R6	Thruxton Circuit (Hampshire)	5 May	(United Kingdom) Michael Meadows	(United Kingdom) Michael Meadows	(United Kingdom) Michael Meadows	Samsung Smart Motorsport
4	R7	Oulton Park (Island Circuit, Cheshire)	9 June	(United Kingdom) Michael Meadows	(United Kingdom) Dean Stoneman	(United Kingdom) Michael Meadows	Samsung Smart Motorsport
4	R8	Oulton Park (Island Circuit, Cheshire)	9 June	(United Kingdom) Michael Meadows	(United Kingdom) Michael Meadows	(United Kingdom) Michael Meadows	Samsung Smart Motorsport
5	R9	Croft Circuit (North Yorkshire)	23 June	(United Kingdom) Michael Meadows	(United Kingdom) Dean Stoneman	(United Kingdom) Dean Stoneman	Redline Racing
5	R10	Croft Circuit (North Yorkshire)	23 June	(United Kingdom) Michael Meadows	(Lithuania) Jonas Gelžinis	(Lithuania) Jonas Gelžinis	Juta Racing
6	R11	Snetterton Motor Racing Circuit (300 Circuit, Norfolk)	4 August	(United Kingdom) Michael Meadows	(United Kingdom) Michael Meadows	(Lithuania) Jonas Gelžinis	Juta Racing
6	R12	Snetterton Motor Racing Circuit (300 Circuit, Norfolk)	4 August	(United Kingdom) Michael Meadows	(United Kingdom) Michael Meadows	(Lithuania) Jonas Gelžinis	Juta Racing
7	R13	Knockhill Racing Circuit (Fife)	25 August	(United Kingdom) Michael Meadows	(United Kingdom) Michael Meadows	(United Kingdom) Michael Meadows	Samsung Smart Motorsport
7	R14	Knockhill Racing Circuit (Fife)	25 August	(United Kingdom) Michael Meadows	(United Kingdom) Michael Meadows	(United Kingdom) Michael Meadows	Samsung Smart Motorsport
8	R15	Rockingham Motor Speedway (International Super Sports Car Circuit, Northamptonshire)	15 September	(United Kingdom) Daniel Lloyd	(United Kingdom) Rory Butcher	(United Kingdom) Rory Butcher	Celtic Speed
8	R16	Rockingham Motor Speedway (International Super Sports Car Circuit, Northamptonshire)	15 September	(United Kingdom) Daniel Lloyd	(United Kingdom) Michael Meadows	(United Kingdom) Rory Butcher	Celtic Speed
9	R17	Silverstone Circuit (National Circuit, Northamptonshire)	29 September	(United Kingdom) Michael Meadows	(United Kingdom) Michael Meadows	(United Kingdom) Michael Meadows	Samsung Smart Motorsport
9	R18	Silverstone Circuit (National Circuit, Northamptonshire)	29 September	(United Kingdom) Michael Meadows	(United Kingdom) Dean Stoneman	(United Kingdom) Dean Stoneman	Redline Racing
10	R19	Brands Hatch (Grand Prix Circuit, Kent)	13 October	(United Kingdom) Michael Meadows	(United Kingdom) Daniel Lloyd	(United Kingdom) Rory Butcher	Celtic Speed
10	R20	Brands Hatch (Grand Prix Circuit, Kent)	13 October	(United Kingdom) Michael Meadows	(United Kingdom) Daniel Lloyd	(United Kingdom) Dean Stoneman	Redline Racing

== Championship standings ==
Pos	Driver	BHI		DON		THR		OUL		CRO		SNE		KNO		ROC		SIL		BHGP		Pen.	Pts
1	(United Kingdom) Michael Meadows	2	9	1	1	6	1	1	1	3	Ret	5	2	1	1	DSQ	4	1	2	3	6		325
2	(Lithuania) Jonas Gelžinis	3	2	2	3	2	3	9	5	4	1	1	1	4	9	2	3	5	3	2	5		310
3	(United Kingdom) Rory Butcher	4	4	4	6	Ret	7	4	3	2	Ret	3	3	2	8	1	1	3	4	1	3		266
4	(United Kingdom) Daniel Lloyd	Ret	3	13	4	1	2	2	2	6	Ret	4	Ret	3	2	Ret	2	2	5	4	2		249
5	(United Kingdom) Dean Stoneman	1	1	3	2	3	Ret	5	4	1	DSQ	2	4	8	3			4	1	Ret	1		231
6	(Spain) Víctor Jiménez	5	7	7	9	4	5	6	8	5	3	7	7	Ret	7	3	5	7	7	5	Ret		194
7	(United Kingdom) Dan de Zille	7	6	10	8	5	8	7	7	9	Ret	Ret	5	6	5	4	6	6	Ret	Ret	4		160
8	(United Kingdom) George Brewster	8	10	8	12					8	2	10	10	7	6					8	7		100
9	(United Kingdom) James Birch							Ret	9	7	Ret	6	6	5	4	DSQ	7	Ret	6	7	Ret		90
10	(United Kingdom) Richard Kent	6	5	6	5	7	4																67
11	(Republic of Ireland) Karl Leonard			5	7			3	6														47
12	(United Kingdom) Pete Smallwood	11	Ret	11	13			8	10									9	8				42
13	(United Kingdom) Will Goff			9	11							9	9										26
14	(Turkey) Yücel Özbek	9	Ret			8	6																25
15	(United Kingdom) George Wright									10	4												20
16	(United Kingdom) Justin Sherwood																			6	8		18
17	(United Kingdom) Keith Webster											8	8										16
18	(United Kingdom) Steven Brewster																	8	9				15
19	(South Africa) Kyle Barnes	10	8																				14
20	(Republic of Ireland) Michael Leonard			12	10																		10
Pos	Driver	BHI		DON		THR		OUL		CRO		SNE		KNO		ROC		SIL		BHGP		Pen.	Pts
