= Ron Meadows =

British mechanic

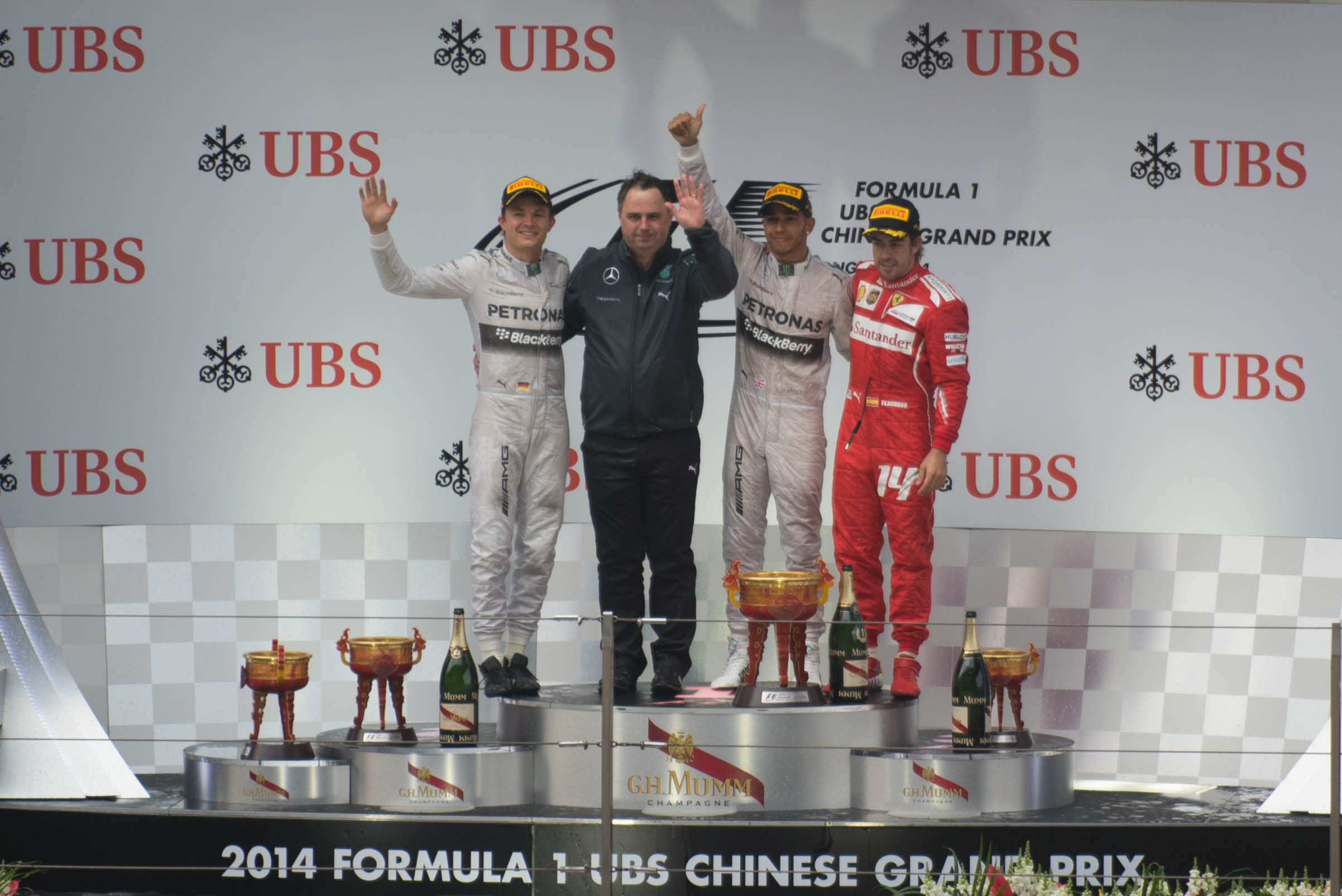
- Ron Meadows on the 2014 Chinese Grand Prix podium.
- Born: Ronald Matthew Meadows; 7 February 1964 (age 62)
- Citizenship: British
- Occupation: Mechanic
- Employer: Mercedes AMG Petronas Motorsport
- Known for: Formula One team manager
- Title: Sporting director
- Children: 4, including Michael

Ronald Matthew Meadows (born 7 February 1964) is a British Formula One mechanic and team manager. He is currently the sporting director at the Mercedes AMG Petronas Motorsport Formula One team.

== Career ==
Meadows started his career in motorsport as a mechanic in his early teens and worked his way through the ranks to running his own Formula 3000 squad. After several years as a team boss, Meadows moved to the US to work for Walker Racing in the Indy Car series. Meadows later joined Adrian Reynard's fledging British American Racing team as their factory manager. After the Brackley-based team struggled during their maiden season, Meadows was promoted to team manager and remained with them as they became Honda Racing, and then took on the sporting director role in 2008. In 2009, he helped Brawn GP take their one and only World Championship, and remained in the same sporting director position as the champions were bought out by Mercedes winning 8 constructors and 7 drivers titles with the team. In his current role Meadows is responsible for managing garage operations and is the lead figure on the Mercedes pit wall. He also represents the team in discussions with the FIA and the Sporting Working Group and directly communicates with race control during the race weekend.

== Personal life ==
Meadows is the father of racing driver Michael Meadows, who notably won the Blancpain GT Series Sprint Cup title in 2018. The pair co-founded a karting and Formula 4 team, Argenti Motorsport, in late 2019.
