= M-Sport =

Motorsport engineering company

M-Sport Limited

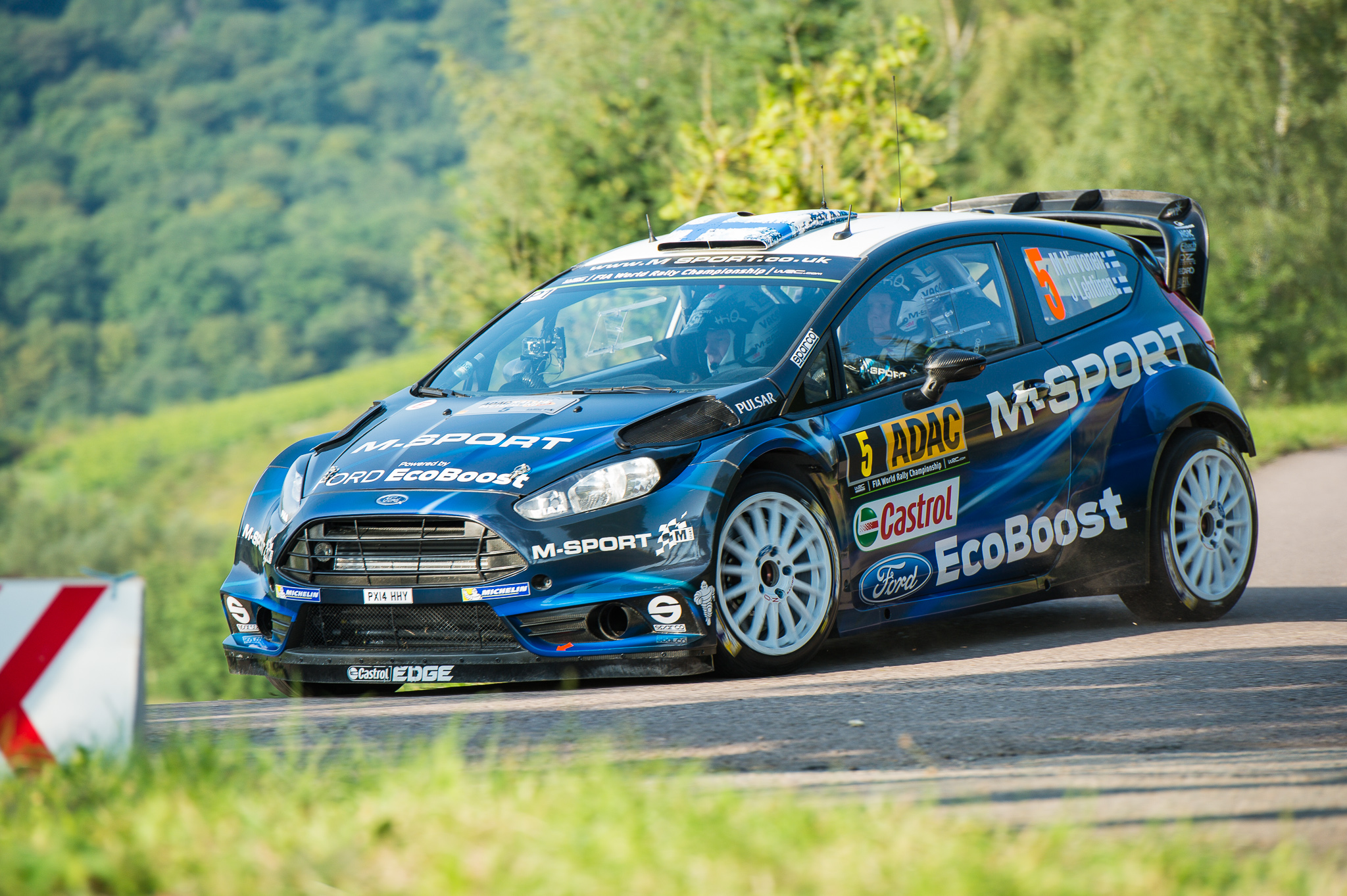
- Type: Private
- Industry: Motorsport; Automotive engineering
- Founded: 1979; 47 years ago
- Founder: Malcolm Wilson
- Headquarters: Dovenby Hall, United Kingdom
- Key people: Malcolm Wilson (Founder and director); Elaine Wilson (Director); Matthew Wilson (Director); John Steele (Former director); Maciej Woda (Board Member, Director of M-Sport Poland); Guenther Steiner (Former director)
- Website: M–Sport

M-Sport is a British motorsport engineering company headquartered at Dovenby Hall near Cockermouth, United Kingdom. It is primarily known for entering the FIA World Rally Championship (WRC) since 1997 in partnership with Ford, manufacturing race and rally cars, and providing parts and motorsport services to customers. The company has an automotive evaluation facility at its headquarters, and a second manufacturing facility in Kraków, Poland.

In 2023, the M-Sport Ford World Rally Team contest the World Rally Championship and WRC2 support championship. M-Sport also organise, operate and act as promoter of the Junior WRC championship on behalf of the FIA. They also provide the official TOCA engine option used in BTCC since 2022.

== History ==
M-Sport began in 1979 when rally driver Malcolm Wilson formed Malcolm Wilson Motorsport, primarily to facilitate his own rallying career and offering motorsport contracting services to customers such as rally car preparation. Reflecting the career of Malcolm Wilson as a driver, the company grew steadily through the 1980s. Wilson and his wife Elaine formed a second company in 1987, M-Sport Limited (known as M. Sport Limited until 2019), trading and manufacturing rally car parts and components.

Following the withdrawal of Ford from motorsport entries in the mid-1990s, M-Sport were awarded the contract to operate and promote the Ford World Rally Team in the WRC from 1997 with Wilson as Team Principal. With his driving career effectively over, M-Sport assumed all trade of Malcolm Wilson Motorsport, legally from 1 January 1998.

The business expanded over time to become a successful manufacturer of rally cars, sold to competitors worldwide. By 2021, they offered rally cars in all five tiers of the Rally Pyramid.

Besides rally and the Ford partnership, the company also ran the official Bentley Motorsport outfit competing in the GT World Challenge Europe Endurance Cup between 2014 and 2019. In 2018, the company became technical partner to Jaguar, assisting in the build of the I-Pace eTrophy racecar used in the championship of the same name.

In 2022, M-Sport released the Ford Puma Rally1 with hybrid powertrain for Rally1 category. Hybrid system will recover energy during braking and can be deployed via electric motor together with the internal combustion engine.

== Motorsport ==
=== World Rally Championship ===
==== Ford World Rally Team (1997–2012) ====
At the end of 1996, Ford Motorsport selected the company to spearhead the Ford team's entry for the 1997 World Rally Championship season with the Ford Escort WRC, a hastily built World Rally Car equivalent of the Group A car. Victories in Greece and Indonesia saw faith in the small team rewarded, and they went on to finish runner-up in the manufacturers' championship.

By the middle of 1998, Ford chose M-Sport to design and build the Ford Focus WRC. The car appeared in 1999 with driver Colin McRae, and immediately sprang to the attention of the world press by recording fastest stage times on its first event, the Monte Carlo Rally. However, the two cars entered were excluded from the event due to the use of an illegally modified water pump. By the third event — the Safari Rally in Kenya — the team had scored its first WRC victory. A month later, an on-form Colin McRae made it two in a row at the Rally of Portugal.

With a move to new premises at Dovenby Hall, M-Sport expanded rapidly, employing over 170 people. In 2006, the Wilson-led Ford team took the manufacturers' World Rally championship title; it was the first time Ford had achieved this feat in 25 years of competing. Since then, M-Sport Ford won seven FIA World Rally Championships, with 61 victories and 262 podiums.

For the 2008 season, the company employed the driving talents of Mikko Hirvonen and Jari-Matti Latvala in their challenge for the World Rally Championship.

The 2009 season saw Mikko Hirvonen and Citroën's Sébastien Loeb contest a closely fought battle throughout the year which ended with Loeb the victor by just one point.

==== M-Sport World Rally Team (2010–present) ====
Beside the Ford entry, the company also ran two cars on behalf of the M-Sport Ford World Rally Team. Matthew Wilson and Henning Solberg were the two drivers competing in 2010. On occasions, a third car was run with a "guest" driver.

==== Customer teams ====
M-Sport supplied cars, personnel, servicing support and/or other entry services to the following customer teams to compete in the World Rally Championship for Manufacturers:

- Stobart VK Ford Rally Team (2006—2009)
- Munchi's Ford World Rally Team (2007—2011)
- Ferm Powertools World Rally Team (2011)
- Monster World Rally Team (2011)
- Team Abu Dhabi (2011)
- Adapta World Rally Team (2012)
- Brazil World Rally Team (2012)
- Jipocar Czech National Team (2013—2016)
- Qatar World Rally Team (2013)
- Lotos Team WRC (2013)
- RK M-Sport WRT (2014)
- FWRT s.r.l. (2015)
- DMACK World Rally Team (2016)
- Yazeed Racing (2016)

=== Other series and championships ===
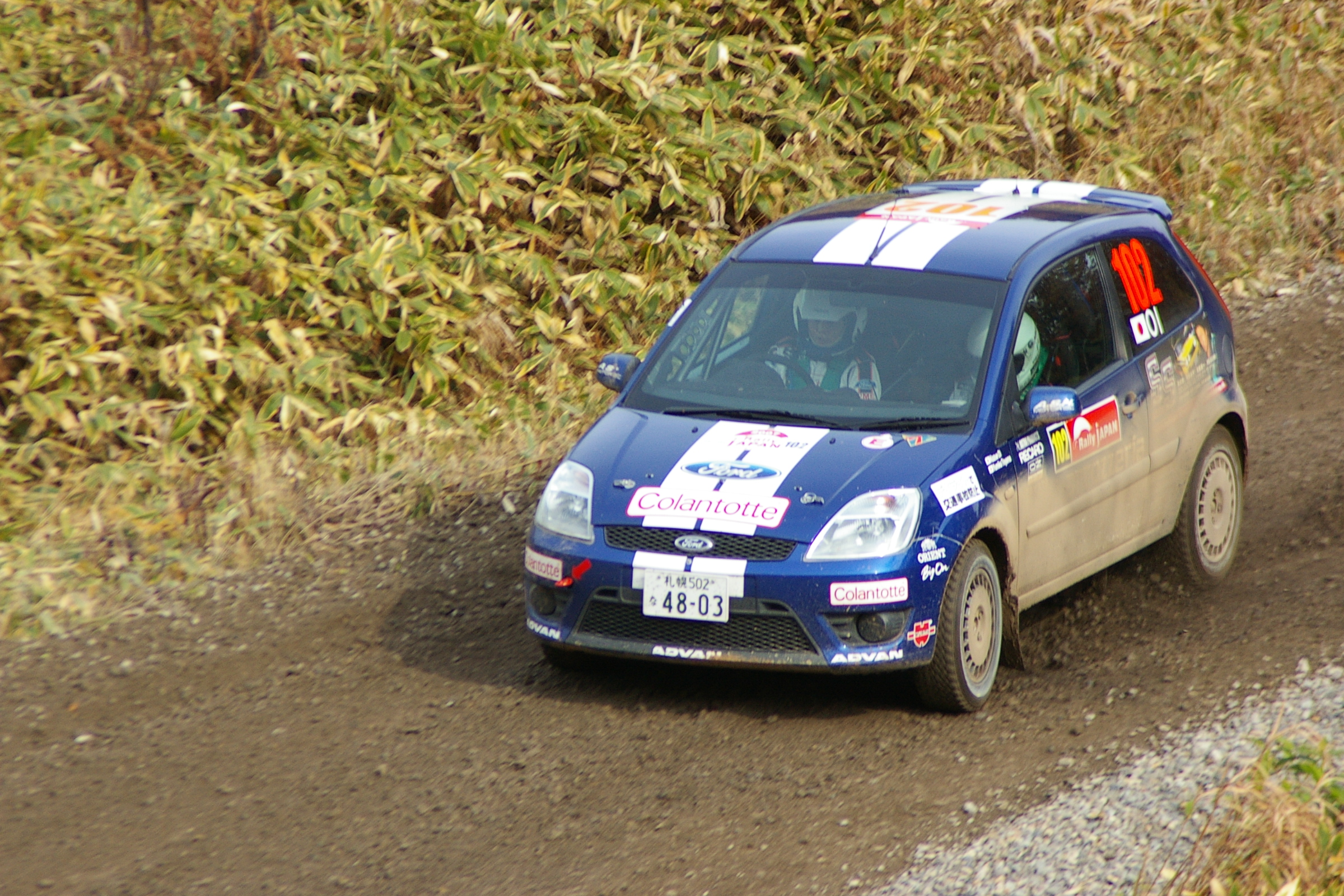
FSTi rally car at Rally Japan

The company ran the one-make Fiesta Sporting Trophy rally series, which it launched in 2006, and the Fiesta Sporting Trophy International (FSTi) series.

M-Sport started preparing Bentley Continental GT3 for Blancpain Endurance Series and British GT Championship in 2014.

M-Sport supplies Ford Fiesta Rallycross Supercars to Global Rallycross Championship teams Hoonigan Racing Division since 2013, and Chip Ganassi Racing and Bryan Herta Autosport since 2015.

M-Sport, alongside Ford Performance and Hoonigan Racing Division has developed Ford Focus RS RX, scheduled to competing in 2016 FIA World Rallycross Championship.

M-Sport provided the official engine option for TOCA used in the BTCC from the 2022 season.

== Manufacturing ==
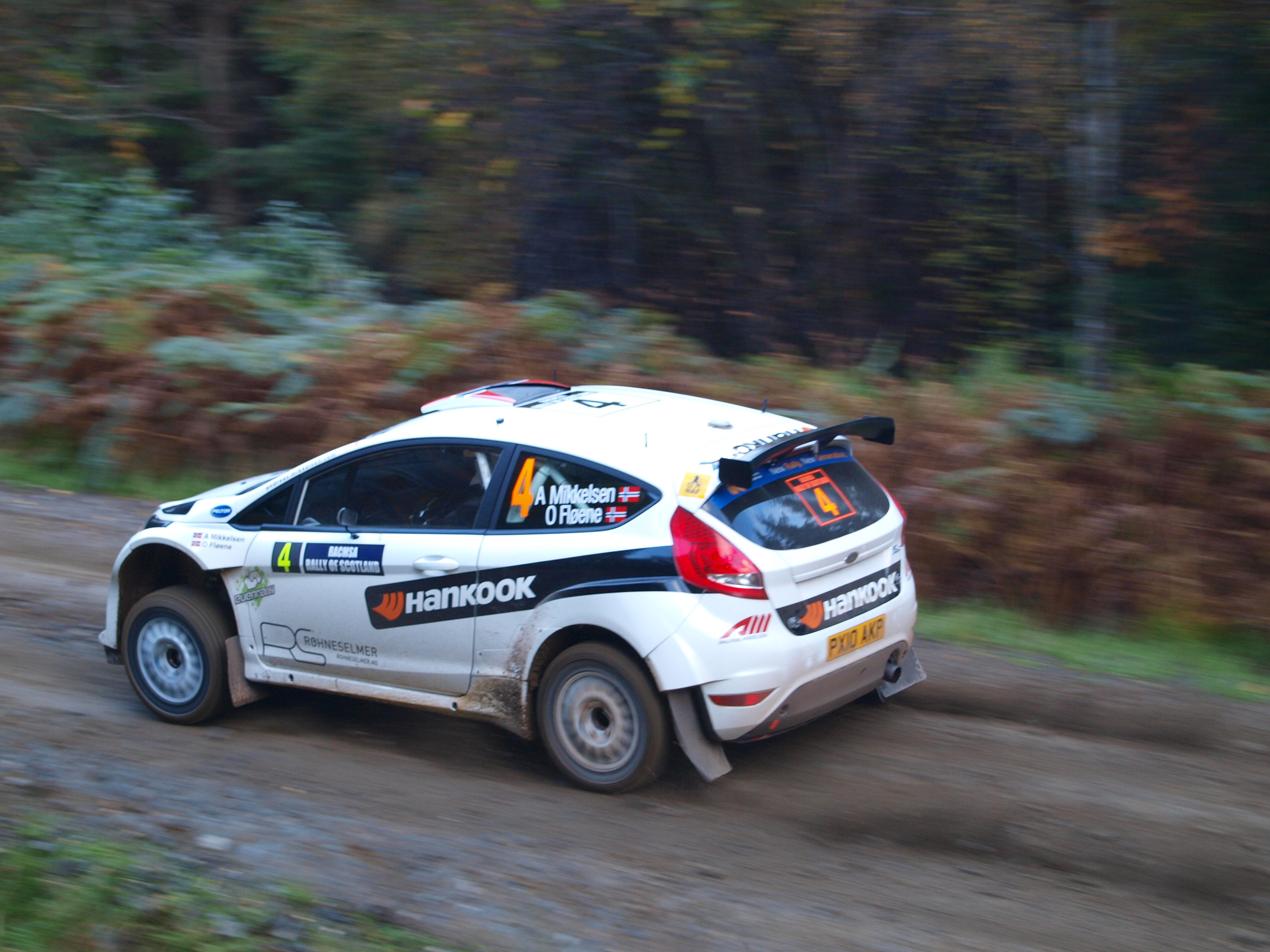
Andreas Mikkelsen in the Ford Fiesta S2000 on his way to second place on the 2010 Rally Scotland (SS4 Drummond Hill)

=== World Rally Cars and Rally1 ===
- Ford Escort WRC
- Ford Focus RS WRC
- Ford Fiesta RS WRC
- Ford Fiesta WRC
- Ford Puma Rally1

=== Ford Fiesta S2000 ===
At the beginning of 2009 Ford with M-Sport started work on a S2000 rally version of the Ford Fiesta. The car, designed by Christian Loriaux, was launched on 18 November 2009 at M-Sport's headquarters. The car made its public debut as a course car at the IRC Rally Scotland driven by Matthew Wilson. Ford did not run a works entry in the 2010 IRC but M-Sport did its own programme of events with Ford's support both on the technical and financial side. M-Sport announced on 8 January 2010 that it was entering the IRC which means that Ford will be a registered manufacturer in the series. Works Ford WRC driver Mikko Hirvonen gave the car its first competitive outing on the Monte Carlo Rally leading the event from start to finish.

A number of private entries were made in the 2010 Super 2000 World Rally Championship.

=== Group R ===
- Ford Fiesta R1
- Ford Fiesta Rally5
- Ford Fiesta R2
- Ford Fiesta R2T
- Ford Fiesta Rally4
- Ford Fiesta Rally3
- Ford Fiesta R5
- Ford Fiesta Rally2

=== Other ===
- Ford Fiesta RRC
- Ford Fiesta ST Group N conversion kit
- Bentley Continental GT3 (as technical partner)
- Jaguar I-Pace eTrophy (as technical partner)

== Records and statistics ==
=== Complete Blancpain Endurance Series results ===
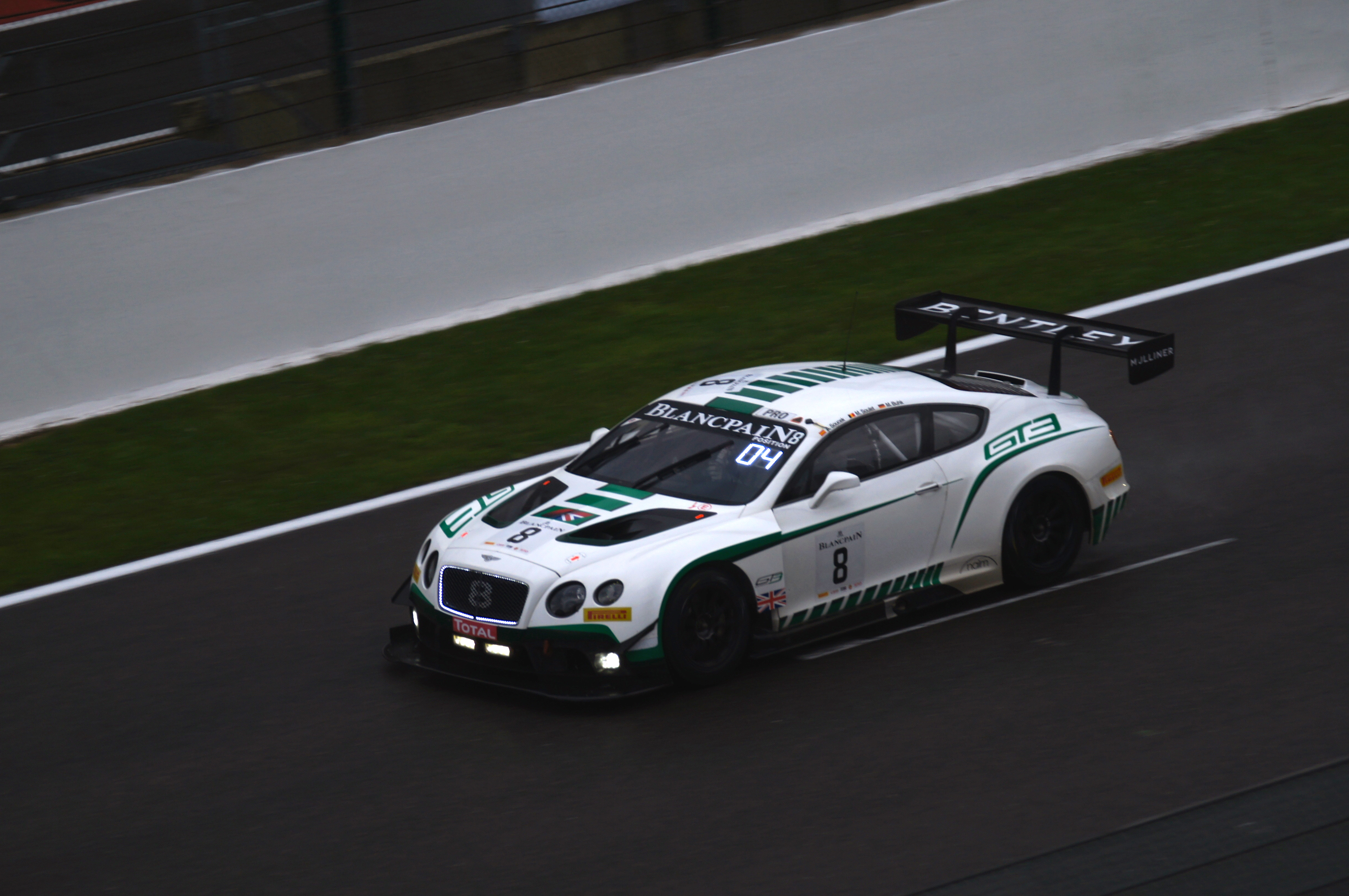
Bentley Continental GT3 racing at the 2015 24 Hours of Spa

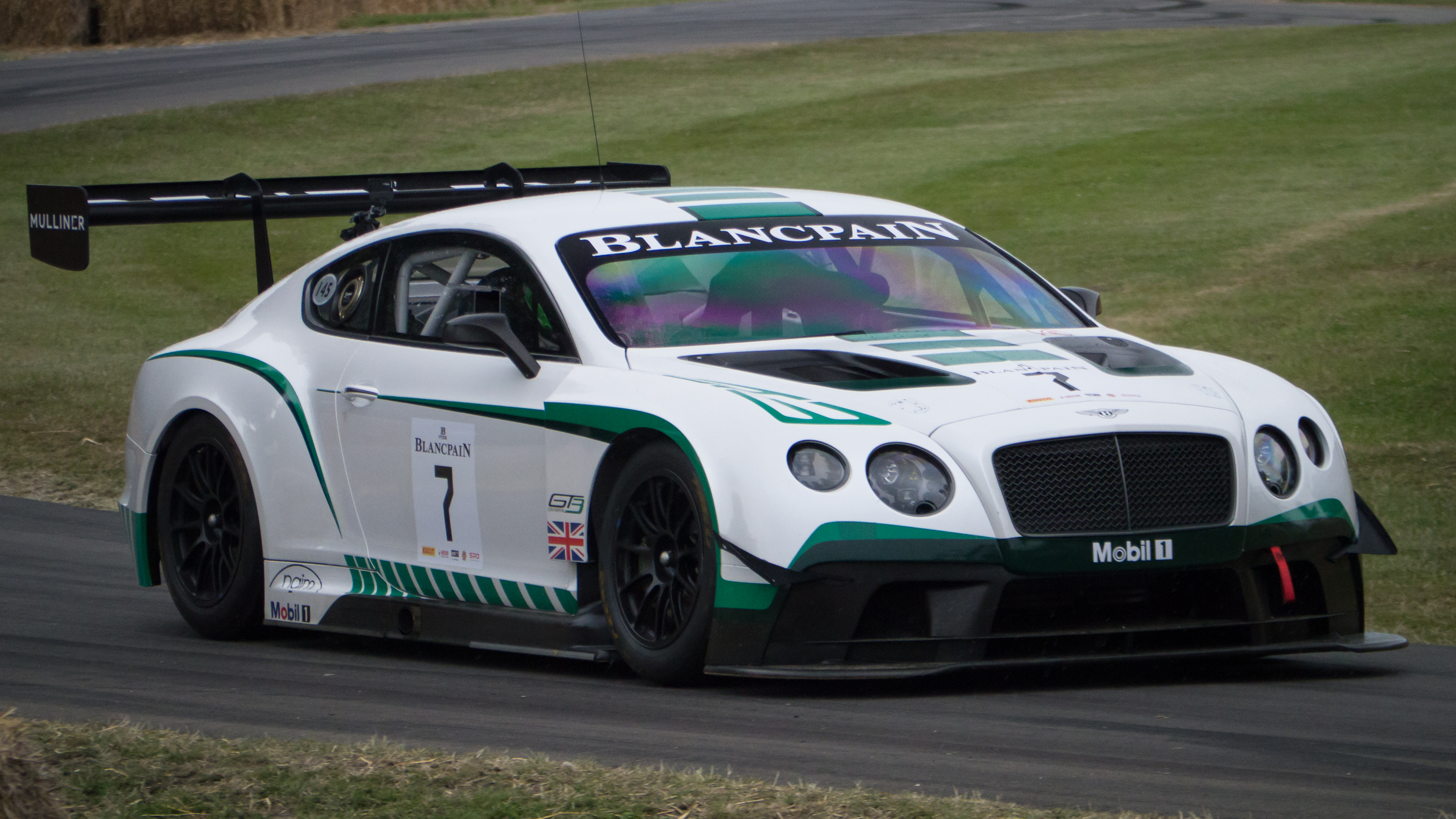
The M-Sport Bentley Continental GT3

Year	Entrant	No	Car	Drivers	1	2	3	4	5	Drivers	Points	Teams	Points
2014	M-Sport Bentley	7	Bentley Continental GT3	(United Kingdom) Steven Kane	MNZ; 8	SIL; 1	PRI; 1	SPA; 9	NUR; 5	3rd	59	2nd	78
2014	M-Sport Bentley	7	Bentley Continental GT3	(United Kingdom) Guy Smith	MNZ; 8	SIL; 1	PRI; 1	SPA; 9	NUR; 5	3rd	59	2nd	78
2014	M-Sport Bentley	7	Bentley Continental GT3	(United Kingdom) Andy Meyrick	MNZ; 8	SIL; 1	PRI; 1	SPA; 9	NUR; 5	3rd	59	2nd	78
2014	M-Sport Bentley	8	Bentley Continental GT3	(Belgium) Jérôme d'Ambrosio	MNZ; 7	SIL; 10	PRI; Ret	SPA; 11	NUR; 7	20th	15	2nd	78
2014	M-Sport Bentley	8	Bentley Continental GT3	(United Kingdom) Duncan Tappy	MNZ; 7	SIL; 10	PRI; Ret	SPA; 11	NUR; 7	20th	15	2nd	78
2014	M-Sport Bentley	8	Bentley Continental GT3	(France) Antoine Leclerc	MNZ; 7	SIL; 10	PRI; Ret	SPA; 11	NUR; 7	20th	15	2nd	78
2015	M-Sport Bentley	7	Bentley Continental GT3	(United Kingdom) Steven Kane	MNZ; 5	SIL; 9	PRI; 2	SPA; Ret	NUR; 2	2nd	59	2nd	96
2015	M-Sport Bentley	7	Bentley Continental GT3	(United Kingdom) Guy Smith	MNZ; 5	SIL; 9	PRI; 2	SPA; Ret	NUR; 2	2nd	59	2nd	96
2015	M-Sport Bentley	7	Bentley Continental GT3	(United Kingdom) Andy Meyrick	MNZ; 5	SIL; 9	PRI; 2	SPA; Ret	NUR; 2	2nd	59	2nd	96
2015	M-Sport Bentley	8	Bentley Continental GT3	(Germany) Maximilian Buhk	MNZ; 13	SIL; 6	PRI; 12	SPA; Ret	NUR; 5	10th	31	2nd	96
2015	M-Sport Bentley	8	Bentley Continental GT3	(Spain) Andy Soucek	MNZ; 13	SIL; 6	PRI; 12	SPA; Ret	NUR; 5	10th	31	2nd	96
2015	M-Sport Bentley	8	Bentley Continental GT3	(Belgium) Maxime Soulet	MNZ; 13	SIL; 6	PRI; 12	SPA; Ret	NUR; 5	10th	31	2nd	96

== See also ==
- Ford Racing
- Ford TeamRS
- Ford World Rally Team
