= Michael Meadows =

British racing driver (born 1987)

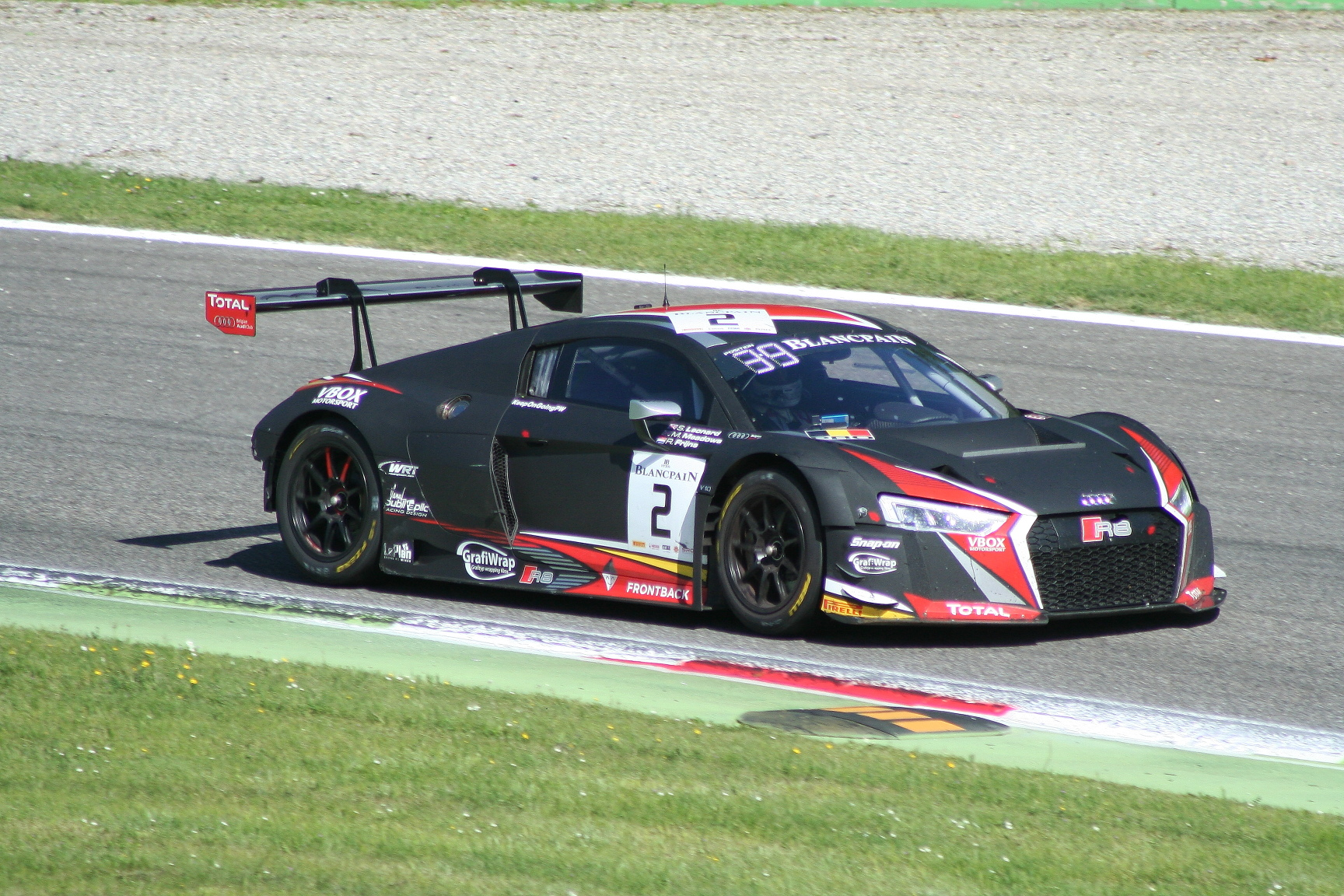
- Meadows in 2016
- Nationality: (United Kingdom) British
- Born: Michael Ronald Meadows; 11 September 1987 (age 39) Oxford, Oxfordshire, UK
- Relatives: Ron Meadows (father)

Porsche Carrera Cup Great Britain career
- Debut season: 2010
- Current team: Redline Racing
- Categorisation: FIA Silver (until 2016); FIA Gold (2017–)
- Car number: 87
- Starts: 113
- Wins: 26
- Poles: 59
- Fastest laps: 30
- Best finish: 1st in 2012, 2013

Previous series
- 2010-2012 2007-2008 2007 2005-2006: Porsche Supercup; International Formula Master; British Formula Three; Formula BMW UK

Championship titles
- 2018 2012-13: Blancpain GT Series Sprint Cup; Porsche Carrera Cup GB

Michael Ronald Meadows (born 11 September 1987 in Oxford) is a British racing driver. A two-time champion in Porsche Carrera Cup GB, he went on to win the 2016 Dubai 24 Hour for Belgian Audi Club Team WRT and the 2018 Blancpain GT Series Sprint Cup for Mercedes-AMG Team AKKA ASP. Since his retirement in 2020, he has been team manager for the Argenti Motorsport Formula 4 team.

== Career ==
In 2012 and 2013, Meadows became the overall champion in Porsche Carrera Cup Great Britain. For the past five years, he has finished in the top two. In 2014, Meadows won more races than Josh Webster, but Webster's greater consistency allowed him to take the overall championship by nine points, ahead of the two-time defending champion Meadows. In 2015, he was beaten by Daniel Cammish, the ex-champion in British Formula Ford. In the ten years he has raced, Meadows has notched up 31 career wins.

Meadows made his debut racing in the 2005 Formula BMW UK series. As well as this, he has appeared in Porsche Supercup, International Formula Master, Blancpain Endurance Series and the British GT Championship.

== Personal life ==
Meadows was born in Oxford, Oxfordshire but now lives in London. His father is Mercedes-AMG F1 sporting director Ron Meadows, who founded the Argenti Kart Team in 2019.

== Racing record ==
=== Complete Formula BMW UK results ===
(key) (Races in bold indicate pole position; races in italics indicate fastest lap)

Year	Entrant	1	2	3	4	5	6	7	8	9	10	11	12	13	14	15	16	17	18	19	20	DC	Pts
2005	Master Motorsport	DON; 1; 7	DON; 2; 15	THR; 1; 10	THR; 2; 11	ROC; 1; 14	ROC; 2; 15	BHI; 1 Ret	BHI; 2; 16	OUL; 1; 5	OUL; 2; 13	CRO; 1; 5	CRO; 2 Ret	MON; 1 Ret	MON; 1; 21	KNO; 1; 8	KNO; 2 Ret	SIL; 1; 18	SIL; 2; 11	BHGP; 1; 9	BHGP; 2; 8	14th	32
2006	Master Motorsport	BHI; 1; 2	BHI; 2; 3	MON; 1; 3	MON; 1; 4	OUL; 1 Ret	OUL; 2 Ret	BHGP; 1; 2	BHGP; 2; 5	THR; 1; 2	THR; 2; 2	CRO; 1; 6	CRO; 2; 5	DON; 1; 8	DON; 2; 19	SNE; 1; 9	SNE; 2; 6	KNO; 1 Ret	KNO; 2; 11	SIL; 1; 3	SIL; 2; 3	5th	151

=== Complete GT World Challenge Europe results ===
==== GT World Challenge Europe Endurance Cup ====
Year	Team	Car	Class	1	2	3	4	5	6	7	Pos.	Points
2014	Leonard Motorsport AMR	Aston Martin V12 Vantage GT3	Pro-Am	MNZ	SIL	LEC	SPA; 6H; 28	SPA; 12H; 18	SPA; 24H; 37	NÜR; 10	16th	17
2015	Leonard Motorsport AMR	Aston Martin V12 Vantage GT3	Pro-Am	MNZ; 30	SIL; 14	LEC; 26	SPA; 6H; 33	SPA; 12H; 15	SPA; 24H; 10	NÜR; 22	4th	53
2016	Belgian Audi Club Team WRT	Audi R8 LMS	Pro	MNZ; 33	SIL; 13	LEC; Ret	SPA; 6H; 19	SPA; 12H; 11	SPA; 24H; Ret	NÜR; 8	42nd	4
2017	AKKA ASP	Mercedes-AMG GT3	Pro	MNZ; Ret	SIL; 3	LEC; 10	SPA; 6H; 11	SPA; 12H; 4	SPA; 24H; 3	CAT; 7	5th	43
2018	SMP Racing by AKKA ASP	Mercedes-AMG GT3	Pro	MNZ; Ret	SIL; Ret	LEC; 7	SPA; 6H; 36	SPA; 12H; 23	SPA; 24H; 16	CAT; 14	41st	6
2019	Mercedes-AMG Team AKKA ASP	Mercedes-AMG GT3	Pro	MNZ; 39	SIL; Ret	LEC; Ret	SPA; 6H	SPA; 12H	SPA; 24H	CAT; 38	NC	0

^{*} Season still in progress.

==== Blancpain GT Series Sprint Cup ====
Year	Team	Car	Class	1	2	3	4	5	6	7	8	9	10	Pos.	Points
2016	Belgian Audi Club Team WRT	Audi R8 LMS	Silver	**MIS**; **QR**; Ret	MIS; CR; 18	BRH; QR; 15	BRH; CR; Ret	NÜR; QR; 28	NÜR; CR; 18	HUN; QR; 12	HUN; CR; 11	CAT; QR; 14	CAT; CR; 20	3rd	96
2017	AKKA ASP	Mercedes-AMG GT3	Pro	MIS; QR; 3	MIS; CR; 16	BRH; QR; 8	BRH; CR; 7	ZOL; QR; 2	ZOL; CR; 23	HUN; QR; 9	HUN; CR; 12	NÜR; QR; 13	NÜR; CR; 14	16th	16
2018	AKKA ASP Team	Mercedes-AMG GT3	Pro	ZOL; 1; 8	ZOL; 2; 2	BRH; 1; 3	BRH; 2; 4	MIS; 1; 2	**MIS**; **2**; 10	HUN; 1; 2	**HUN**; **2**; 1	NÜR; 1; 4	NÜR; 2; 1	1st	98

Sporting positions
Preceded by James Sutton	Porsche Carrera Cup GB; Champion; 2012-2013	Succeeded by Josh Webster
Preceded by Robin Frijns; Stuart Leonard	Blancpain GT Series Sprint Cup; Champion; 2018; With: Raffaele Marciello	Succeeded by Andrea Caldarelli; Marco Mapelli (GT World Challenge Europe)
