= Stuart Leonard =

British racing driver

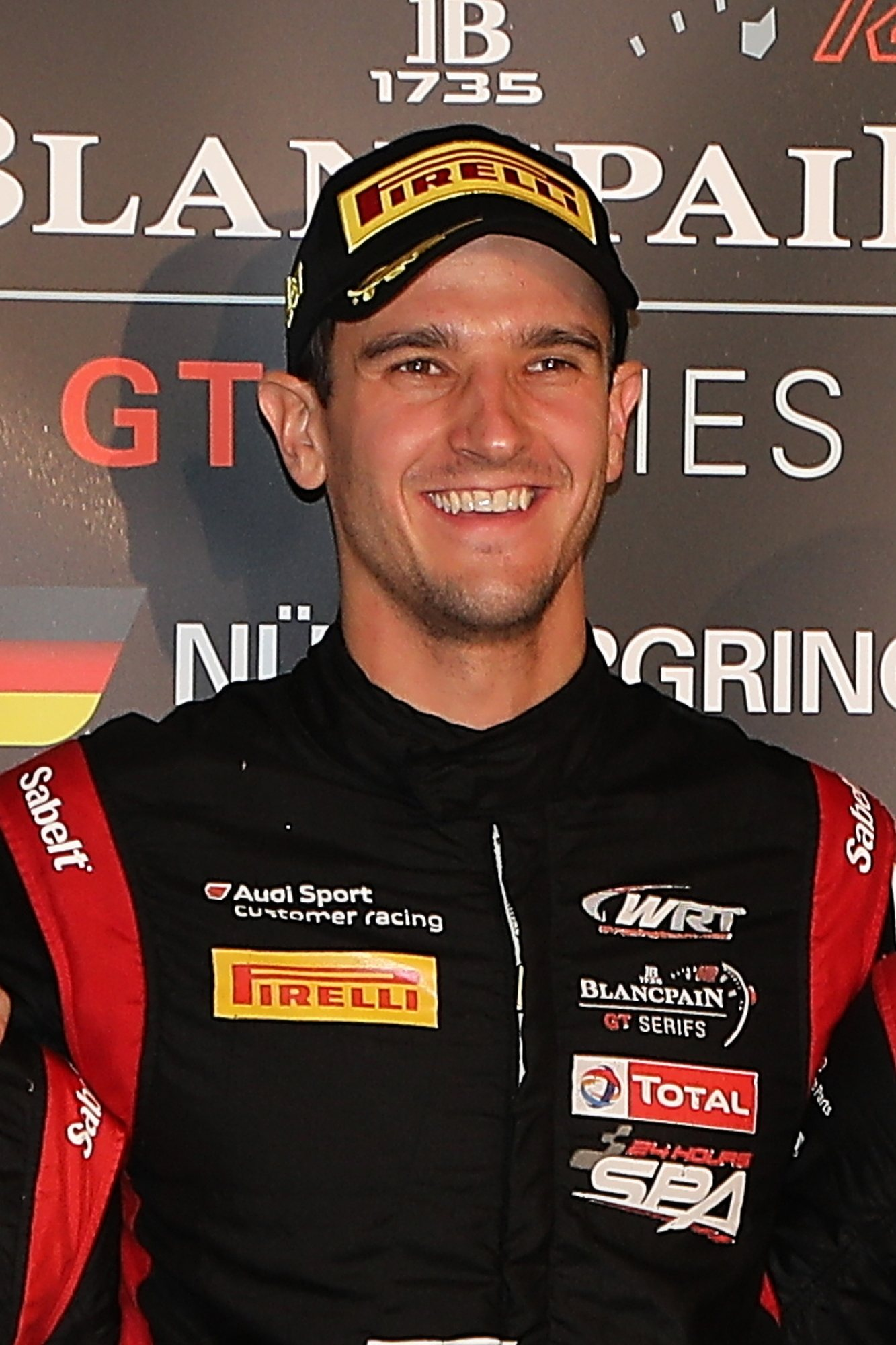
- Leonard in 2017
- Nationality: (United Kingdom) British
- Born: 13 June 1991 (age 35) London, United Kingdom
- Current team: Team WRT
- Categorisation: FIA Silver

Stuart Leonard (born 13 June 1991) is a British racing driver. A former Audi stalwart in top-flight sports car racing, he won the 2016 Dubai 24 Hour, the 2017 Blancpain GT Series Sprint Cup and the 2018 Bathurst 12 Hour for Team WRT.

== Career ==
=== Caterhams ===
In 2012, whilst studying for a degree in Finance, Leonard started his motorsport career in the Caterham Tracksport category. Due to his university commitments, he was only able to compete in some of the scheduled races. In Leonard's first year he took home two podiums, consisting of a win, and third place position, both at the Nürburgring GP circuit in Germany.

In 2013 Leonard moved up to the top of the Caterham ladder (R300 Superlight Championship), whilst being coached by the 2012 R300 Champion, Paul Wilson. That year, Leonard entered the second to last round leading the championship, however due to mechanical difficulties finished the championship second on points.

=== Aston Martin GT3 ===
In 2014 Leonard started driving for Prodrive in the GT3 category. After a successful debut driving their Aston Martin GT3 at VLN Nürburgring Nordschleife, Leonard started competing in the Blancpain GT Endurance Series, racing his first 24 hour race at the Spa 24 Hours (Pro-Am).

In 2015 Leonard won the Silverstone round of the Blancpain GT Endurance Series (Pro-Am) with Michael Meadows and Paul Wilson, completing the Blancpain GT Endurance Championship in fourth position. Leonard also participated in the British GT series at Spa-Francorchamps with Michael Meadows, finishing third overall and first in class (Silver Cup).

=== Audi R8 GT3 ===
In 2015 Leonard moved from Prodrive to W-Racing Team, driving an Audi R8 GT3. Leonard competed in an all pro line-up in the Sepang 12 Hours, part of the Intercontinental GT Challenge. Leonard achieved his first win with Audi, alongside his teammates Laurens Vanthoor and Stéphane Ortelli.

In 2016 Leonard entered the Dubai 24 Hour, alongside his teammates Laurens Vanthoor, Michael Meadows and Alain Ferté. The team won the race, making it Audi’s first win in the Dubai 24 Hour. Later that year Leonard competed with Michael Meadows in the Blancpain GT Sprint Cup for the Silver Cup Championship, and the Blancpain Endurance Cup, adding Robin Frijns to the team line-up in the Pro Cup.

Leonard also competed in the 24 Hours Nürburgring, with teammates Robin Frijns, Frederic Vervische and Edward Sandstrome, finishing eighth overall.

In 2017 Leonard joined teammate Robin Frijns for the Blancpain Sprint Pro Cup. Together they became the 2017 Blancpain Sprint Cup champions. Leonard also competed in the Blancpain Endurance Pro Cup, taking a second place finish in the Barcelona round with teammates Robin Frijns and Jake Dennis.

Leonard also teamed up with Alain Ferté for the two British GT races at Spa-Francorchamps, finishing second in both races

=== Hyundai Motorsport ===
In 2017 Leonard became involved in the development of Hyundai’s road car, the i30N. He was also entered in the first and second rounds of the VLN Endurance Championship, finishing third in class for both, and later finishing fourth in class at the 24 Hours Nürburgring.

== Racing Record ==
| Season | Series | Team | Car | Races | Podiums | Wins | Position |
|---|---|---|---|---|---|---|---|
| 2012 | Caterham, Tracksport | DPR Motorsport | Caterham Tracksport | 8 | 2 | 1 | N/A |
| 2013 | Caterham, R300 Superlight | DPR Motorsport | Caterham R300 Superlight | 14 | 5 | 1 | 3rd |
| 2014 | VLN Championship | Prodrive | Aston Martin GT3 | 4 | 0 | 0 | N/A |
| | Blancpain Endurance Championship (ProAm Cup) | Prodrive | Aston Martin GT3 | 3 | 0 | 0 | N/A |
| 2015 | Blancpain Endurance Championship (ProAm Cup) | Prodrive | Aston Martin GT3 | 5 | 1 | 1 | 4th |
| | British GT Spa-Francorchamps (Overall) | Prodrive | Aston Martin GT3 | 1 | 1 | 0 | 3rd |
| | 12 Hours of Sepang (Pro) | WRT | Audi R8 LMS GT3 | 1 | 1 | 1 | 1st |
| 2016 | Blancpain Sprint Championship (Silver Cup) | WRT | Audi R8 LMS GT3 | 10 | 5 | 2 | 3rd |
| | Blancpain Endurance Championship (Pro Cup) | WRT | Audi R8 LMS GT3 | 5 | 0 | 0 | 44th |
| | 24 Hours of Dubai (Pro) | WRT | Audi R8 LMS GT3 | 1 | 1 | 1 | 1st |
| | 24 Hours of Nürburgring (Overall) | WRT | Audi R8 LMS GT3 | 1 | 0 | 0 | 8th |
| 2017 | Blancpain Sprint Championship (Pro Cup) | WRT | Audi R8 LMS GT3 | 10 | 4 | 2 | 1st |
| | Blancpain Endurance Championship (Pro Cup) | WRT | Audi R8 LMS GT3 | 5 | 1 | 0 | 10th |
| | Blancpain GT Championship (Pro Cup) | WRT | Audi R8 LMS GT3 | 15 | 5 | 2 | 4th |
| | British GT Spa-Francorchamps (Overall) | WRT | Audi R8 LMS GT3 | 2 | 2 | 0 | 2nd |
| | 24 Hours of Dubai (Pro) | WRT | Audi R8 LMS GT3 | 1 | 0 | 0 | 13th |
| | 8 Hours of Laguna Seca (Pro) | WRT | Audi R8 LMS GT3 | 1 | 0 | 0 | 6th |

=== Complete Bathurst 12 Hour results ===
| Year | Car# | Team | Co-Drivers | Car | Class | Laps | Pos. | Class Pos. |
|---|---|---|---|---|---|---|---|---|
| 2018 | 37 | (Belgium) Audi Sport Team WRT | (Netherlands) Robin Frijns (Belgium) Dries Vanthoor | Audi R8 LMS | APP | 271 | 1st | 1st |

Sporting positions
| Preceded by Enzo Ide | Blancpain GT Series Sprint Cup; Champion; 2017; With: Robin Frijns | Succeeded by Raffaele Marciello; Michael Meadows |
| Preceded by Craig Lowndes; Toni Vilander; Jamie Whincup | Winner of the Bathurst 12 Hour; 2018; With: Robin Frijns & Dries Vanthoor | Succeeded by Matt Campbell; Dennis Olsen; Dirk Werner |
